= Shukhrat Mukhammadiev =

Uzbekistani footballer

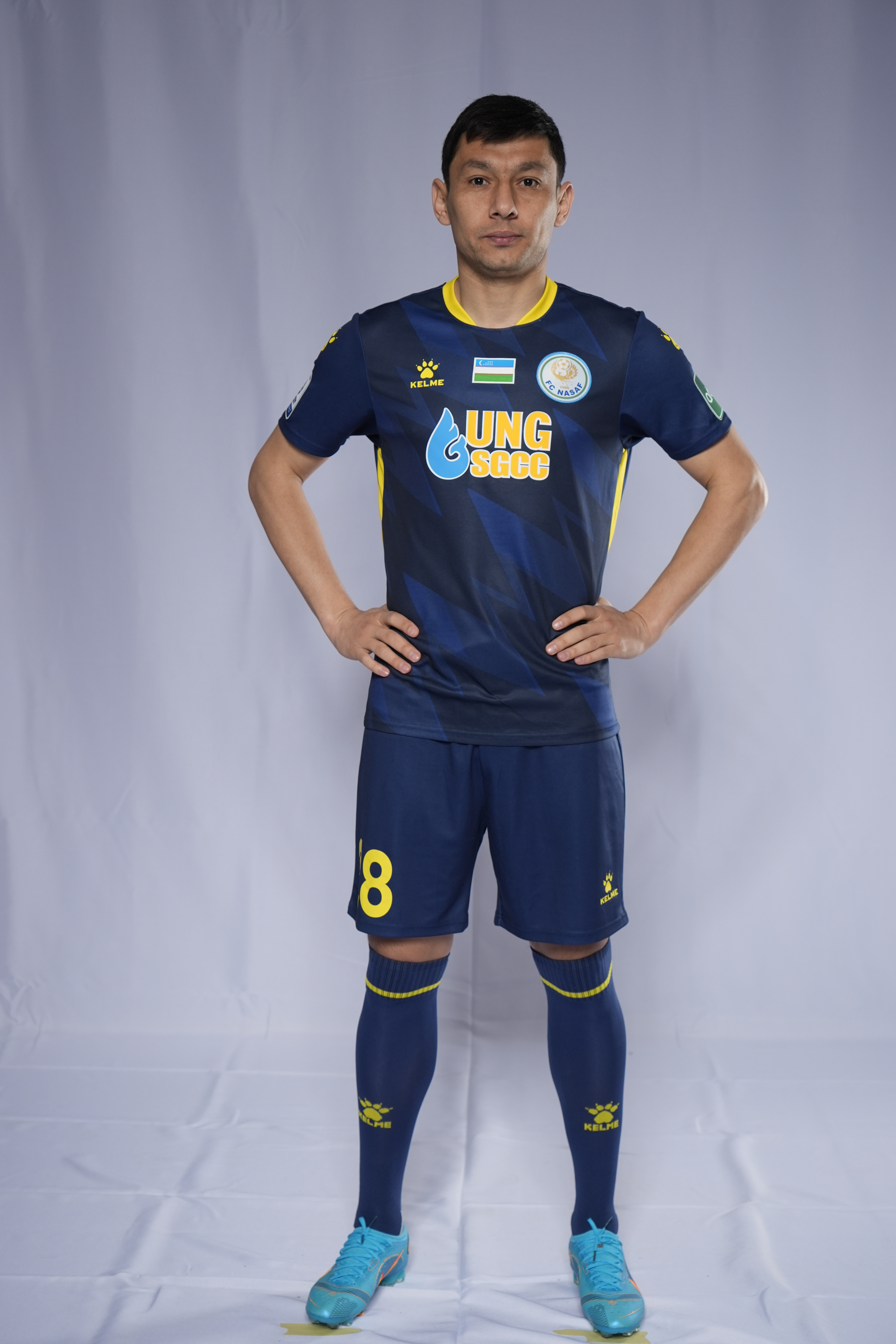

Personal information
- Full name: Shukhrat Mukhammadiev
- Date of birth: 24 June 1989 (age 37)
- Place of birth: Shahrisabz, Soviet Union
- Position: Defender

Team information
- Current team: Lokomotiv Tashkent
- Number: 28

Youth career
- –2009: Mashʼal Mubarek

Senior career*
Years	Team	Apps	(Gls)
2009–2012	Mashʼal Mubarek	42	(3)
2013–2017	Nasaf	86	(3)
2017–2021	Lokomotiv Tashkent	93	(0)
2022	Qizilqum Zarafshon	23	(0)
2022-2025	Nasaf	64	(0)
2026-	Lokomotiv Tashkent	11	(0)

International career
2014–2018	Uzbekistan	12	(0)
- * Club domestic league appearances and goals as of 29 July 2026

Shukhrat Mukhammadiev (born 24 June 1989) is an Uzbekistani professional footballer who plays as a defender for Lokomotiv Tashkent.

== Career ==
=== Club ===
Shukhrat Mukhammadiyev started his career in professional football in 2007 in "Nasaf Karshi", where played in only two league matches. In 2009, joined the club "Mashal Mubarek". Having played four seasons in this club, he appeared on the field in a total of 55 matches, three times hitting the opponents' goal. In February 2013, again signed a contract with the Karshi club and still defends the honor of this club. By this time, he had played 41 matches for Nasaf and scored three goals. In the 2017 season, he moved to Lokomotiv Tashkent. As a member of club, became one of the irreplaceable players for five seasons and won all tournaments of Uzbek competitions with the club. In the 2022 season, signed a contract with Navoi club "Qizilqum". In the 2023 season, he returned to Nasaf.

=== National team ===
He made his national team debut on 27 May 2014 in a match against Oman. As part of the national team, he plays at the 2015 Asian Cup in Australia, where he played two matches.

== Achievements ==
- Uzbekistan Super League Gold medalist: 2017, 2018, 2024
- Uzbekistan Super League Silver medalist: 2019, 2023
- Uzbekistan Super League Bronze medalist: 2013, 2014, 2015, 2016
- Uzbekistan Cup winner: 2015, 2017, 2023
- Uzbekistan Cup Silver medalist: 2013, 2016
- Uzbekistan Super Cup: (5) 2016, 2019, 2023, 2024, 2025
