= Husniddin Gafurov =

Uzbek footballer (born 1994)

Personal information
- Full name: Husniddin Ergash oʻgʻli Gʻofurov
- Date of birth: 29 July 1994 (age 32)
- Place of birth: Fergana, Uzbekistan
- Height: 1.70 m (5 ft 7 in)
- Position: Winger

Team information
- Current team: Kokand 1912
- Number: 10

Senior career*
Years	Team	Apps	(Gls)
2012–2013	NBU Osiyo	20	(14)
2013–2017	Javor Ivanjica	80	(9)
2017	Mladost Lučani	8	(1)
2018–2019	Lokomotiv Tashkent	37	(4)
2019–2021	Pakhtakor Tashkent	9	(0)
2020	→ Surkhon Termez (loan)	13	(2)
2020	→ AGMK	12	(3)
2021	AGMK	23	(0)
2022	Neftchi Fergana	4	(0)
2022	Sondigana Jizzakh	10	(1)
2023	Metallurg Bekabad	17	(4)
2024	Dinamo Samarqand	5	(0)
2024–	Kokand 1912	14	(2)

International career^{‡}
2013	Uzbekistan U17	1	(0)
2016	Uzbekistan U19	2	(0)
2016–	Uzbekistan U23	1	(0)
2014–	Uzbekistan	8	(1)
- * Club domestic league appearances and goals as of 11 March 2025 ‡ National team caps and goals as of 16 April 2024

Husniddin Gofurov (Uzbek: Хусниддин Ғофуров, born 29 July 1994) is an Uzbek professional footballer who plays as a winger for FC Dinamo Samarqand.

== Club career ==
Born in Fergana, Gofurov played in 2012–13 season with NBU Osiyo in Uzbekistan before moving to Serbia. In 2013, he became the best goal scorer of NBU Osiyo in Uzbekistan First League, scoring 14 goals totally and 13 of them in first phase of championship. In summer 2013 he signed a three-year contract with FK Javor Ivanjica. On 31 August 2013, he made his debut in the 2013–14 Serbian SuperLiga as a started in a fourth-round match against FK Spartak Zlatibor Voda.

On 15 January 2018, Gafurov signed two-year contract with Lokomotiv Tashkent. He won the 2018 Uzbekistan Super League and the 2019 Uzbekistan Super Cup with Lokomotiv. Next, on 21 July 2019, he signed with rivals Pakhtakor Tashkent.

== International career ==
Gafurov was part of the Uzbekistan U17 national team camp in May 2013.

On 19 May 2014, Gafurov was called up for friendly match against Oman.

He made his official debut for national team on 27 May 2014 for match against Oman, playing in starting line-up.

In 2016, he had plenty of activity at youth level. In January, he was member of the Uzbekistan U-23 team at the 2016 AFC U-23 Championship, and, in October, he was member of was member of Uzbekistan U-19 at the 2016 AFC U-19 Championship.

== Career statistics ==
=== International ===
Appearances and goals by national team and year
National team	Year	Apps	Goals
Uzbekistan	2014	1	0
Uzbekistan	2015	–	
Uzbekistan	2016	–	
Uzbekistan	2017	–	
Uzbekistan	2018	6	0
Uzbekistan	2019	–	
Uzbekistan	2020	–	
Uzbekistan	2021	1	1
Total		8	1

Scores and results list Uzbekistan's goal tally first, score column indicates score after each Gafurov goal.

List of international goals scored by Husniddin Gafurov
No.	Date	Venue	Opponent	Score	Result	Competition
1	15 February 2021	Theyab Awana Stadium, Dubai, United Arab Emirates	Jordan	1–0	2–0	Friendly

== Honours ==
Lokomotiv Tashkent

- Uzbekistan Super League: 2018
- Uzbekistan Super Cup: 2019

Pakhtakor Tashkent

- Uzbekistan Super League: 2019
- Uzbek Cup: 2019
