= Avazbek Ulmasaliev =

Uzbekistani footballer (born 2000)

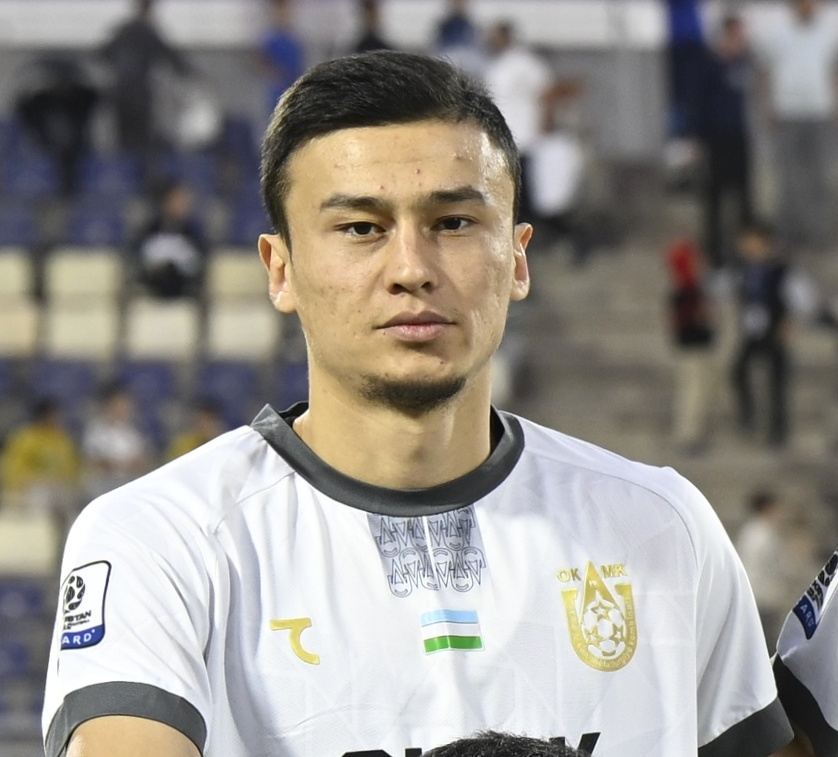
- Ulmasaliev in 2025

Personal information
- Full name: Avazbek Alisher oʻgʻli Oʻlmasaliyev
- Date of birth: 27 March 2000 (age 26)
- Place of birth: Fergana, Uzbekistan
- Height: 1.85 m (6 ft 1 in)
- Position: Centre-back

Team information
- Current team: AGMK
- Number: 6

Youth career
- 2013–2016: Neftchi Fergana

Senior career*
Years	Team	Apps	(Gls)
2016–2018	Neftchi Fergana	23	(2)
2019–2021	Lokomotiv Tashkent	23	(2)
2021	→ Bunyodkor	18	(3)
2022–2023	Bunyodkor	48	(1)
2024–	AGMK	55	(8)

International career
2018–2019	Uzbekistan U23	4	(0)
- * Club domestic league appearances and goals as of 28 July 2026

Avazbek Alisher oʻgʻli Oʻlmasaliyev (born 27 March 2000) is an Uzbekistani professional footballer who plays as a centre-back for AGMK.

== Club career ==
Ulmasaliev is a graduate of the Neftchi Children's Football Academy. He began his professional career in the 2016 season as part of the youth team of Neftchi Fergana and signed his first professional contract with the Fergana team in the 2017 season. Ulmasaliev became one of the main players in his first season with the club and scored 1 goal in 9 games. In the 2018 season, he participated in 15 games and scored his only goal of the season in a match against Nasaf.

At the end of the season, due to Neftchi being relegated to the Uzbekistan Pro League, Ulmasaliev changed clubs and signed a contract with Lokomotiv Tashkent in 2019. His first trophy with his new team was the Uzbekistan Super Cup. He played for the Railroaders for two seasons.

Ulmasaliev moved to another Tashkent team in the 2021 season, in which he was loaned to Bunyodkor. During one season at Bunyodkor, he became one of the team's most reliable players. Before the 2022 season, Ulmasaliev signed a contract with Pakhtakor, but later returned to the Bunyodkor a month later due to disagreements over the terms of the contract. He started the 2022 season with Bunyodkor, scored 1 goal in 48 matches in the Uzbekistan Super League for two seasons, and was promoted to the club captain in the 2023 season. At the end of the 2023 season, his contract with Bunyodkor expired and he left the club as a free agent.

On 9 January 2024, Ulmasaliev signed a two-year contract with AGMK.

== International career ==
Ulmasaliev was included in Uzbekistan's squad which won the 2025 CAFA Nations Cup.

On 5 May 2026, Ulmasaliev was named to Uzbekistan's 40-man preliminary squad for the 2026 FIFA World Cup and named to the final squad was 2 June.

== Honours ==
Lokomotiv Tashkent

- Uzbekistan Super Cup: 2019

Uzbekistan

- CAFA Nations Cup: 2025
