= 1999 Uzbekistan Super Cup =

Navbahor	Pakhtakor
(Uzbekistan)	(Uzbekistan)
4	2
- Date: 29 August 1999
- Venue: Fergana Stadium, Fergana
- Man of the Match: Leonid Koshelev (Navbahor)
- Referee: Ghayrat Karimov (Uzbekistan)
- Attendance: 6,000
- Weather: Cloudy; 18 °C (64 °F)

1999 Uzbekistan Super Cup (Футбол бўйича 1999–йилги Ўзбекистон Суперкубоги) was the first match in the history of the Uzbekistan Super Cup. According to some sources, the tournament was also referred to as the "Uzbekistan President's Cup" in 1999. It took place on 29 August at the "Fergana" stadium in the city of Fergana (capacity: 16,000 spectators). 6,000 fans attended the match.

The participants of the 1999 Uzbekistan Super Cup were the 1998 Uzbek League champions — Tashkent’s Pakhtakor, and the 1998 Uzbekistan Cup winners – Namangan's Navbahor. The match ended 4–2 in favor of the Namangan club, making Navbahor the first-ever winner of the Uzbekistan Super Cup in history.

After that, for unknown reasons, the tournament was not held again until 2014.

== Match ==
29 August 1999
18:00 UTC+05:00

Navbahor Namangan (Uzbekistan)	4:2	(Uzbekistan) Pakhtakor Tashkent
Shuhrat Rahmonqulov 20'; Leonid Koshelev 55'; Saydullo Tursunov 75'; Leonid Koshelev 77'		88' Andrey Akopyans; 88' Andrey Akopyans

Navbahor	Pakhtakor

#
GK	1	(Uzbekistan) Dmitry Bashkevich	(substituted off) 64'
DF	2	(Uzbekistan) Rashid Gafurov	(substituted off) 80'
DF	3	(Uzbekistan) Saydullo Tursunov
DF	4	(Uzbekistan) Hayrulla Karimov	(yellow card) 44'
DF	15	(Kazakhstan) Konstantin Galchenko
MF	6	(Uzbekistan) Leonid Koshelev (c)
MF	7	(Uzbekistan) Bakhodir Saidkamolov
MF	8	(Uzbekistan) Shuhrat Rahmonqulov
MF	25	(Uzbekistan) Tohir Madrahimov	(yellow card) 33'
FW	10	(Uzbekistan) Anvar Soliyev
FW	11	(Uzbekistan) Rustam Durmonov	(substituted off) 75'
Substitutes:
GK	26	(Uzbekistan) Oleg Belyakov	(substituted on) 64'
DF	5	(Uzbekistan) Sherzod Nazarov	(substituted on) 75'
FW	16	(Uzbekistan) Jakhongir Rozukulov	(substituted on) 80'
Head coach:
(Uzbekistan) Victor Jalilov

#
GK	1	(Uzbekistan) Pavel Bugalo (c)
DF	2	(Uzbekistan) Bakhtiyor Ashurmatov	(yellow card) 29'
DF	3	(Uzbekistan) Rustam Shaymardanov
DF	5	(Uzbekistan) Vladimir Galianov	(substituted off) 86'
DF	20	(Uzbekistan) Baxtiyor Qambaraliev
MF	6	(Uzbekistan) Noʻmon Nurmatov	(substituted off) 67'
MF	7	(Uzbekistan) Nikolay Shirshov
MF	8	(Uzbekistan) Marat Ahmerov	(substituted off) 46'
MF	9	(Uzbekistan) Azamat Abduraimov
FW	10	(Uzbekistan) Igor Shkvirin
FW	11	(Uzbekistan) Andrey Akopyans
Substitutes:
DF	4	(Uzbekistan) Andrey Streltsov (substituted on) 86'
MF	14	(Uzbekistan) Murod Aliyev (substituted on) 46'
MF	26	(Uzbekistan) Aleksandr Pisarev (substituted on) 67'
Head coach:
(Uzbekistan) Ahmad Ubaydullayev
