= Diyorjon Turapov =

Uzbekistani association football player

Personal information
- Full name: Diyorjon Turapov
- Date of birth: 9 July 1994 (age 32)
- Place of birth: Gʻallaorol, Uzbekistan
- Height: 1.73 m (5 ft 8 in)
- Position: Midfielder

Team information
- Current team: Lokomotiv Tashkent
- Number: 23

Senior career*
Years	Team	Apps	(Gls)
2013–2017	Olmaliq FK	76	(10)
2017–2022	Lokomotiv Tashkent	103	(13)
2022	Navbahor Namangan	12	(0)
2023–2024	Neftchi Fergana	38	(4)
2025–	Lokomotiv Tashkent	22	(1)

International career^{‡}
2013	Uzbekistan U20	6	(1)
2014–	Uzbekistan	1	(0)
- * Club domestic league appearances and goals as of 29 July 2026 ‡ National team caps and goals as of 1 June 2014

Diyorjon Turapov (born 9 July 1994) is an Uzbekistani football midfielder currently playing for Lokomotiv Tashkent in the Uzbekistan Professional Football League.

== Career ==
He has played for Olmaliq FK since 2013. He was a member of Uzbekistan under-20 football team at the 2013 FIFA U-20 World Cup. At the 2013 U-20 World Cup he scored the third goal of the game in a win against New Zealand.

On 29 May 2014 he made his debut for Uzbekistan in a friendly match against Oman which ended with a 0–1 win for Oman.

== Honours ==
Lokomotiv
Uzbekistan Super League (2)
2017, 2018
Uzbek Cup (1)
2017
Uzbekistan Super Cup
2019
