= 2016 Uzbek League =

Uzbek League
- Season: 2016
- Champions: Lokomotiv
- Relegated: FK Andijan
- Champions League: Nasaf Qarshi; Bunyodkor
- Top goalscorer: Abdukholiqov (22)
- Biggest home win: Metallurg-Mashal - 6:0; (8 August 2016); Nasaf-Navbahor - 6:0; (22 October 2016)
- Biggest away win: Navbahor-Pakhtakor - 1:5; (24 September 2016)

The 2016 Uzbek League (Футбол бўйича 2016-йилги Ўзбекистон Олий лигаси) was the 25th season of top-level football in Uzbekistan since 1992. Pakhtakor were the defending champions from the 2015 campaign.

== Teams ==
Location of teams in 2016 Uzbek League

Sogdiana Jizzakh remained for 2016 Uzbek League after winning in relegation play-off match with Oqtepa. Obod Tashkent promoted to 2016 League as 2015 First League winner. The draw of 2016 season was held on 22 December 2015. The first matchday is scheduled for 4 March 2016.

Club	Coach	Location	Stadium	Capacity
FK Andijan	(Uzbekistan) Orif Mamatkazin	Andijan	Soghlom Avlod Stadium	18,360
Bunyodkor	(Russia) Sergey Lushan	Tashkent	Bunyodkor Stadium	34,000
Bukhoro	(Uzbekistan) Jamshid Saidov	Bukhoro	Buxoro Arena	22,700
Kokand 1912	(Uzbekistan) Numon Khasanov	Kokand	Kokand Stadium	10,500
Lokomotiv	(Uzbekistan) Andrey Miklyaev	Tashkent	Lokomotiv Stadium	8,000
Mash'al	(Uzbekistan) Alexander Khomyakov	Muborak	Bahrom Vafoev Stadium	10,000
Metallurg	(Uzbekistan) Rustam Mirsodiqov	Bekabad	Metallurg Stadium	15,000
Nasaf Qarshi	(Uzbekistan) Ruziqul Berdiev	Qarshi	Qarshi Stadium	14,750
Navbahor	(Uzbekistan) Ilkhom Muminjonov	Namangan	Navbahor Stadium	22,000
Neftchi	(Russia) Andrey Fyodorov	Farghona	Istiqlol Stadium	20,000
Obod Tashkent	(Uzbekistan) Jafar Irismetov	Tashkent	Obod Stadium	
Olmaliq FK	(Uzbekistan) Igor Shkvyrin	Olmaliq	Olmaliq SM Stadium	12,000
Pakhtakor	(Uzbekistan) Grigoriy Kolosovskiy	Tashkent	Pakhtakor Stadium	35,000
Qizilqum	(Uzbekistan) Yuriy Lukin	Zarafshon	Yoshlar Stadium	12,500
Sogdiana	(Uzbekistan) Davron Fayziev	Jizzakh	Sogdiana Stadium	11,650
Shurtan Guzar	(Uzbekistan) Ikhtiyor Karimov	Ghuzor	Ghuzor Stadium	7,000

=== Managerial changes ===
Team	Outgoing manager	Manner of departure	Date of vacancy	Position in table	Replaced by	Date of appointment
Obod	(Uzbekistan) Khayrulla Abdiev	Resigned	December 2015	Pre-season	(Uzbekistan) Bobur Zukhriddinov (interim)	December 2015
Kokand 1912	(Uzbekistan) Vadim Shodimatov	end of caretaker spell	6 December 2015	Pre-season	(Uzbekistan) Murod Ismoilov	7 December 2015
Navbahor	(Uzbekistan) Bakhtiyor Ashurmatov	Sacked	28 December 2015	Pre-season	(Uzbekistan) Rashid Gafurov (interim)	28 December 2015
Shurtan	(Uzbekistan) Mukhtor Kurbonov	Resigned	5 January 2016	Pre-season	(Uzbekistan) Ikhtiyor Karimov	
Andijan	(Uzbekistan) Sergey Kovshov	end of caretaker spell	30 January 2016	Pre-season	(Uzbekistan) Bakhtiyor Ashurmatov	30 January 2016
Navbahor	(Uzbekistan) Rashid Gafurov	Sacked	27 April 2016	6th matchday	(Uzbekistan) Alexander Volkov (interim)	27 April 2016
Kokand 1912	(Uzbekistan) Murod Ismoilov	Resigned	16 May 2016		(Uzbekistan) Sergey Kovshov (interim)	16 May 2016
Pakhtakor	(Uzbekistan) Numon Khasanov	Resigned	27 May 2016		(Uzbekistan) Grigoriy Kolosovskiy (interim)	27 May 2016
Kokand 1912	(Uzbekistan) Sergey Kovshov	end of caretaker spell	11 June 2016		(Uzbekistan) Numon Khasanov	11 June 2016
Andijan	(Uzbekistan) Bakhtiyor Ashurmatov	Sacked	14 June 2016		(Uzbekistan) Orif Mamatkazin	14 June 2016
Obod	(Uzbekistan) Bobur Zukhriddinov	end of caretaker spell	18 June 2016		(Uzbekistan) Alexander Mochinov	18 June 2016
Navbahor	(Uzbekistan) Alexander Volkov	Sacked	22 June 2016		(Uzbekistan) Mustafo Bayramov (interim)	22 June 2016
Navbahor	(Uzbekistan) Mustafo Bayramov	end of caretaker spell	2 July 2016		(Uzbekistan) Ravshan Bozorov	2 July 2016
Obod	(Uzbekistan) Alexander Mochinov	Resigned	9 September 2016		(Uzbekistan) Jafar Irismetov	10 September 2016
Navbahor	(Uzbekistan) Ravshan Bozorov	Sacked	6 November 2016		(Uzbekistan) Ilkhom Muminjonov	6 November 2016

== Foreign players ==
The number of foreign players is restricted to five per USL team. A team can use only five foreign players on the field in each game.

Club	Player 1	Player 2	Player 3	AFC Player	Former players
AGMK	(United States) Graham Smith	(Serbia) Nemanja Jovanović	(Serbia) Darko Stanojević	(Turkmenistan) Arslanmyrat Amanow	(Ukraine) Yaroslav Martynyuk (Russia) Evgeniy Gogol
Andijon	(Moldova) Denis Ilescu			(Turkmenistan) Elman Tagayev	
Lokomotiv	(Georgia (country)) Kakhi Makharadze	(Bosnia and Herzegovina) Nemanja Janičić	(Montenegro) Slaven Stjepanović	(Turkmenistan) Artur Geworkyan	
Pakhtakor	(Montenegro) Adnan Orahovac				
Mash'al Mubarek	(Ukraine) Vladyslav Pavlenko	(Ukraine) Vyacheslav Shevchenko			
FC Buxoro	(Moldova) Vadim Cemirtan				
FC Bunyodkor	(Tunisia) Chaker Zouaghi	(Croatia) Jurica Buljat	(Serbia) Aleksandar Alempijević	(Japan) Minori Sato	(Bosnia and Herzegovina) Samir Bekrić
Navbahor	(Ukraine) Oleksandr Pyschur	(Moldova) Alexandru Melenciuc	(Russia) Igor Golban	(South Korea) Choi Hyun-yeon	
Neftchi Fergana				(Tajikistan) Akmal Kholmatov	
FC Obod					
Metallurg Bekabad					
Nasaf	(Montenegro) Dejan Boljević	(Serbia) Dragan Ceran	(Serbia) Ognjen Krasić		(Slovenia) Rok Roj (Turkmenistan) Artur Geworkyan
FC Shurtan Guzar	(Ukraine) Oleksandr Pyschur				
Kokand 1912	(Serbia) Darko Gojkovic	(Bosnia and Herzegovina) Nikola Valentić			
Sogdiana Jizzakh					
Qizilqum Zarafshon	(Ukraine) Andriy Derkach	(Georgia (country)) Georgiy Kvesieshvili			

== League table ==
Pos	Team	Pld	W	D	L	GF	GA	GD	Pts	Qualification or relegation
1	Lokomotiv (C)	30	23	5	2	77	24	+53	74	2017 AFC Champions League group stage
2	Bunyodkor	30	19	6	5	60	24	+36	63	2017 AFC Champions League 2nd qualifying round
3	Nasaf	30	18	9	3	46	13	+33	63	2017 AFC Champions League 2nd qualifying round
4	Bukhara	30	17	7	6	42	27	+15	58	
5	Pakhtakor	30	15	7	8	49	30	+19	52	
6	Qizilqum	30	14	8	8	41	32	+9	50	
7	Metallurg	30	14	7	9	47	34	+13	49	
8	Mashal	30	11	5	14	35	41	−6	38	
9	Shurtan	30	12	2	16	43	56	−13	38	
10	Sogdiana	30	9	7	14	23	41	−18	34	
11	Neftchi	30	9	4	17	28	43	−15	31	
12	Kokand 1912	30	8	5	17	31	55	−24	29	
13	Olmaliq	30	8	2	20	40	54	−14	26	
14	Obod	30	6	6	18	25	51	−26	24	
15	Navbahor	30	6	5	19	37	66	−29	23	Qualification to the Relegation play-offs
16	Andijan	30	6	5	19	20	50	−30	23	Relegation to Lower Division

Updated to match(es) played on 23 November 2016. Source: Uzbekistan Professional Football League
Rules for classification: 1) points; 2) goal difference; 3) number of goals scored.
(C) Champions

=== Table of matches ===
Date and time (UZT)	Match	Score	Attendance
05.03.2016, 16:00	Kokand 1912 vs Obod	1–0	
05.03.2016, 16:00	Metallurg vs Sogdiana	2–1	
05.03.2016, 17:00	Buxoro vs Olmaliq	2–0	
05.03.2016, 17:00	Qizilqum vs Mash’al	3–2	
05.03.2016, 18:00	Bunyodkor vs Neftchi	2–0	1,428
06.03.2016, 16:00	Navbahor vs Lokomotiv	2–3	16,250
06.03.2016, 18:00	Nasaf vs Shurtan	2–1	2,660
07.03.2016, 18:00	Paxtakor vs Andijon	2–1	
11.03.2016, 16:00	Andijon vs Lokomotiv	1–3	
11.03.2016, 16:00	Mash’al vs Metallurg	1–3	4,210
11.03.2016, 17:00	Sogdiana vs Bunyodkor	0–1	10,684
11.03.2016, 17:00	Olmaliq vs Nasaf	1–3	
11.03.2016, 17:00	Paxtakor vs Kokand 1912	4–0	1,250
12.03.2016, 16:00	Obod vs Buxoro	0–0	
12.03.2016, 17:00	Shurtan vs Qizilqum	0–1	
31.03.2016, 18:00	Bunyodkor vs Mash’al	0–0	531
01.04.2016, 16:00	Lokomotiv vs Neftchi	4–0	
01.04.2016, 18:00	Nasaf vs Obod	1–0	
01.04.2016, 18:00	Buxoro vs Paxtakor	0–0	22,571
02.04.2016, 16:00	Kokand 1912 vs Andijon	1–0	
02.04.2016, 16:00	Navbahor vs Sogdiana	0–0	
02.04.2016, 16:30	Metallurg vs Shurtan	3–2	
02.04.2016, 18:00	Qizilqum vs Olmaliq	2–1	
09.04.2016, 16:00	Kokand 1912 vs Buxoro	0–1	
09.04.2016, 16:00	Andijon vs Neftchi	2–1	
09.04.2016, 16:00	Obod vs Qizilqum	2–2	
09.04.2016, 17:00	Olmaliq vs Metallurg	2–0	
09.04.2016, 17:00	Mash’al vs Navbahor	2–1	
10.04.2016, 17:00	Shurtan vs Bunyodkor	0–1	6,452
10.04.2016, 17:00	Sogdiana vs Lokomotiv	1–1	
11.04.2016, 18:30	Paxtakor vs Nasaf	1–1	
15.04.2016, 16:30	Lokomotiv vs Mash’al	3 : 1	
15.04.2016, 18:00	Qizilqum vs Paxtakor	2 : 2	
15.04.2016, 18:30	Nasaf vs Kokand 1912	1 : 0	
16.04.2016, 16:30	Navbahor vs Shurtan	3 : 1	
16.04.2016, 16:30	Metallurg vs Obod	2 : 1	
16.04.2016, 17:00	Neftchi vs Sogdiana	0 : 1	
16.04.2016, 19:00	Bunyodkor vs Olmaliq	4 : 2	1,306
17.04.2016, 18:30	Buxoro vs Andijon	5 : 2	
23.04.2016, 17:00	Obod vs Bunyodkor	0 : 4	2,178
23.04.2016, 17:00	Olmaliq vs Navbahor	2 : 1	
23.04.2016, 17:30	Mash’al vs Neftchi	1 : 2	
23.04.2016, 18:00	Andijon vs Sogdiana	3 : 0	
24.04.2016, 17:00	Shurtan vs Lokomotiv	0 : 2	
24.04.2016, 17:00	Kokand 1912 vs Qizilqum	0 : 3	
24.04.2016, 18:00	Buxoro vs Nasaf	0 : 2	
25.04.2016, 18:30	Paxtakor vs Metallurg	2 : 1	
28.04.2016, 17:00	Lokomotiv vs Olmaliq	4 : 0	
28.04.2016, 18:00	Nasaf vs Andijon	3 : 0	
29.04.2016, 19:00	Bunyodkor vs Paxtakor	3 : 0	
30.04.2016, 17:00	Metallurg vs Kokand 1912	3 : 1	
30.04.2016, 17:30	Sogdiana vs Mash’al	1 : 0	
30.04.2016, 18:00	Navbahor vs Obod	2 : 1	
30.04.2016, 18:00	Neftchi vs Shurtan	2 : 2	
30.04.2016, 19:00	Qizilqum vs Buxoro	1 : 2	
07.05.2016, 18:00	Paxtakor vs Navbahor	3 : 0	
07.05.2016, 18:00	Shurtan vs Sogdiana	4 : 2	
07.05.2016, 19:00	Buxoro vs Metallurg	0 : 0	
08.05.2016, 17:00	Andijon vs Mash’al	1 : 0	
08.05.2016, 17:00	Obod vs Lokomotiv	0 : 2	
08.05.2016, 18:00	Olmaliq vs Neftchi	3 : 0	
08.05.2016, 19:00	Nasaf vs Qizilqum	2 : 0	
09.05.2016, 17:00	Kokand 1912 vs Bunyodkor	0 : 2	6,282
12.05.2016	Lokomotiv vs Paxtakor	1:0	
14.05.2016	Neftchi vs Obod	1:0	
14.05.2016	Navbahor vs Kokand 1912	5:1	
14.05.2016	Mash’al vs Shurtan	2:1	
14.05.2016	Sogdiana vs Olmaliq	1:0	
14.05.2016	Bunyodkor vs Buxoro	3:0	1 504
14.05.2016	Qizilqum vs Andijon	2:1	
16.05.2016	Metallurg vs Nasaf	1:0	
27.05.2016	Obod vs Sogdiana	2:1	
28.05.2016	Andijon vs Shurtan	1:3	
28.05.2016	Olmaliq vs Mash’al	1:0	
28.05.2016	Paxtakor vs Neftchi	1:2	
28.05.2016	Qizilqum vs Metallurg	1:1	
28.05.2016	Nasaf vs Bunyodkor	1:1	8 621
29.05.2016	Buxoro vs Navbahor	3:2	
30.05.2016	Kokand 1912 vs Lokomotiv	1:3	
10.06.2016	Mash’al vs Obod	5:0	
10.06.2016	Metallurg vs Andijon	3:1	
10.06.2016	Bunyodkor vs Qizilqum	2:0	968
10.06.2016	Neftchi vs Kokand 1912	2:1	
11.06.2016	Sogdiana vs Paxtakor	0:1	
11.06.2016	Navbahor vs Nasaf	2:2	
11.06.2016	Shurtan vs Olmaliq	4:3	
11.06.2016	Lokomotiv vs Buxoro	3:1	
15.06.2016	Obod vs Shurtan	2:3	
16.06.2016	Metallurg vs Bunyodkor	1:1	4 301
16.06.2016	Kokand 1912 vs Sogdiana	1:2	
16.06.2016	Andijon vs Olmaliq	0:2	
16.06.2016	Qizilqum vs Navbahor	1:0	
16.06.2016	Buxoro vs Neftchi	2:0	
16.06.2016	Paxtakor vs Mash’al	3:0	
16.06.2016	Nasaf vs Lokomotiv	1:2	
20.06.2016, 19:00	Bunyodkor vs Andijon	2:0	869
20.06.2016, 19:00	Shurtan vs Paxtakor	3:1	6,851
20.06.2016, 19:30	Olmaliq vs Obod	3:1	1,151
21.06.2016, 18:30	Neftchi vs Nasaf	2:2	2,515
21.06.2016, 19:00	Navbahor vs Metallurg	0:1	
21.06.2016, 19:00	Mash’al vs Kokand 1912	2:0	
21.06.2016, 19:00	Sogdiana vs Buxoro	0:0	
28.07.2016, 20:00	Lokomotiv vs Qizilqum	2:0	
25.06.2016, 18:00	Metallurg vs Lokomotiv	3:3	4,812
25.06.2016, 18:10	Andijon vs Obod	0:1	3,018
25.06.2016, 18:30	Navbahor vs Bunyodkor	1:3	4,382
25.06.2016, 19:00	Buxoro vs Mash’al	0:1	17,315
25.06.2016, 19:30	Qizilqum vs Neftchi	0:0	9,127
26.06.2016, 18:00	Kokand 1912 vs Shurtan	4:2	
26.06.2016, 19:20	Paxtakor vs Olmaliq	2:1	
26.06.2016, 20:00	Nasaf vs Sogdiana	2:1	
30.06.2016, 18:00	Obod vs Paxtakor	1:4	
30.06.2016, 19:00	Shurtan vs Buxoro	1:1	
30.06.2016, 19:30	Olmaliq vs Kokand 1912	3:2	
01.07.2016, 19:00	Lokomotiv vs Bunyodkor	0:0	2,112
01.07.2016, 19:00	Neftchi vs Metallurg	1:0	2,315
01.07.2016, 19:00	Navbahor vs Andijon	2:0	3,279
01.07.2016, 19:00	Mash’al vs Nasaf	1:0	3,526
01.07.2016, 19:30	Sogdiana vs Qizilqum	1:1	5,283
02.08.2016, 18:30	Mash’al vs Qizilqum	0:1	
02.08.2016, 19:00	Obod vs Kokand 1912	2:1	755
03.08.2016, 18:00	Sogdiana vs Metallurg	0:0	
03.08.2016, 18:00	Lokomotiv vs Navbahor	5:0	
03.08.2016, 18:30	Neftchi vs Bunyodkor	2:1	
03.08.2016, 19:00	Shurtan vs Nasaf	0:3	
03.08.2016, 19:00	Olmaliq vs Buxoro	0:1	
03.08.2016, 19:30	Andijon vs Paxtakor	1:0	
08.08.2016, 17:00	Nasaf vs Olmaliq	2:1	5,156
08.08.2016, 18:00	Metallurg vs Mash’al	6:0	2,712
08.08.2016, 18:00	Kokand 1912 vs Paxtakor	1:1	6,253
08.08.2016, 18:00	Navbahor vs Neftchi	2:1	11,755
08.08.2016, 19:00	Buxoro vs Obod	1:0	13,501
08.08.2016, 19:00	Lokomotiv vs Andijon	3:1	566
09.08.2016, 19:00	Bunyodkor vs Sogdiana	1:0	515
09.08.2016, 19:00	Qizilqum vs Shurtan	2:0	9,171
12.08.2016, 18:30	Obod vs Nasaf	0:3	1,077
13.08.2016, 18:00	Andijon vs Kokand 1912	0:2	9,615
13.08.2016, 19:00	Mash’al vs Bunyodkor	1:1	3,721
13.08.2016, 19:15	Shurtan vs Metallurg	1:0	4,023
13.08.2016, 19:15	Olmaliq vs Qizilqum	2:3	1,225
13.08.2016, 19:30	Paxtakor vs Buxoro	1:1	1,403
14.08.2016, 18:00	Sogdiana vs Navbahor	2:1	4,953
14.08.2016, 19:00	Neftchi vs Lokomotiv	1:1	8,920
18.08.2016, 17:30	Metallurg vs Olmaliq	4:2	1,114
18.08.2016, 18:00	Lokomotiv vs Sogdiana	4:1	511
18.08.2016, 19:00	Qizilqum vs Obod	4:1	9,357
19.08.2016, 18:00	Bunyodkor vs Shurtan	2:1	728
19.08.2016, 18:30	Nasaf vs Paxtakor	2:1	7,898
19.08.2016, 19:00	Navbahor vs Mash’al	3:2	3,981
19.08.2016, 19:00	Buxoro vs Kokand 1912	3:1	15,324
19.08.2016, 19:30	Neftchi vs Andijon	1:2	8,017
25.08.2016, 18:00	Obod vs Metallurg	1:1	746
25.08.2016, 18:00	Shurtan vs Navbahor	3:2	6,547
26.08.2016, 18:00	Paxtakor vs Qizilqum	1:0	1,217
26.08.2016, 18:00	Kokand 1912 vs Nasaf	1:2	6,251
26.08.2016, 19:00	Andijon vs Buxoro	1:4	5,152
26.08.2016, 19:00	Sogdiana vs Neftchi	1:0	7,238
18.10.2016, 16:00	Mash’al vs Lokomotiv	0:4	1,221
18.10.2016, 16:45	Olmaliq vs Bunyodkor	0:2	318
09.09.2016, 16:45	Metallurg vs Paxtakor	2:0	2,821
09.09.2016, 18:00	Navbahor vs Olmaliq	3:3	3,241
09.09.2016, 18:00	Neftchi vs Mash’al	1:2	1,773
09.09.2016, 18:30	Qizilqum vs Kokand 1912	1:1	8,107
09.09.2016, 19:00	Sogdiana vs Andijon	1:0	5,326
09.09.2016, 19:00	Lokomotiv vs Shurtan	3:0	381
09.09.2016, 19:00	Nasaf vs Buxoro	3:0	4,156
10.09.2016, 18:30	Bunyodkor vs Obod	3:0	576
16.09.2016, 17:00	Obod vs Navbahor	3:0	457
16.09.2016, 17:30	Mash’al vs Sogdiana	1:1	1,728
17.09.2016, 17:00	Kokand 1912 vs Metallurg	2:1	5,159
17.09.2016, 17:00	Andijon vs Nasaf	0:0	6,553
17.09.2016, 17:30	Shurtan vs Neftchi	2:1	3,451
17.09.2016, 18:00	Buxoro vs Qizilqum	2:0	16,311
17.09.2016, 18:00	Olmaliq vs Lokomotiv	2:5	832
17.09.2016, 18:30	Paxtakor vs Bunyodkor	2:1	2,317
23.09.2016, 17:30	Lokomotiv vs Obod	1:1	355
24.09.2016, 16:30	Metallurg vs Buxoro	1:2	1,529
24.09.2016, 17:00	Neftchi vs Olmaliq	3:1	1,230
24.09.2016, 17:30	Mash’al vs Andijon	5:0	1,559
24.09.2016, 17:30	Navbahor vs Paxtakor	1:5	3,416
24.09.2016, 18:00	Sogdiana vs Shurtan	0:2	2,632
24.09.2016, 18:30	Bunyodkor vs Kokand 1912	3:0	—
25.09.2016, 18:30	Qizilqum vs Nasaf	3:3	9,768
28.09.2016, 18:00	Buxoro vs Bunyodkor	0:0	17,772
28.09.2016, 18:30	Paxtakor vs Lokomotiv	2:1	3,472
30.09.2016, 18:15	Nasaf vs Metallurg	3:0	4,116
01.10.2016, 16:00	Kokand 1912 vs Navbahor	1:1	5,321
01.10.2016, 16:30	Andijon vs Qizilqum	1:2	3,415
01.10.2016, 17:00	Obod vs Neftchi	2:1	1,534
01.10.2016, 17:00	Olmaliq vs Sogdiana	0:1	569
01.10.2016, 17:30	Shurtan vs Mash’al	1:0	4,850
14.10.2016, 15:30	Metallurg vs Qizilqum	1:0	628
14.10.2016, 16:00	Lokomotiv vs Kokand 1912	4:0	552
14.10.2016, 16:00	Mash’al vs Olmaliq	2:1	1,352
14.10.2016, 17:00	Navbahor vs Buxoro	1:2	—
14.10.2016, 17:00	Sogdiana vs Obod	2:1	4,304
15.10.2016, 16:00	Neftchi vs Paxtakor	1:0	2,972
15.10.2016, 16:30	Shurtan vs Andijon	2:0	4,351
15.10.2016, 17:00	Bunyodkor vs Nasaf	1:0	1,232
22.10.2016, 15:30	Kokand 1912 vs Neftchi	2:1	5,531
22.10.2016, 15:30	Andijon vs Metallurg	0:0	1,802
22.10.2016, 16:00	Olmaliq vs Shurtan	3:0	1,101
22.10.2016, 17:00	Paxtakor vs Sogdiana	3:0	543
22.10.2016, 17:00	Buxoro vs Lokomotiv	2:1	18,736
22.10.2016, 17:30	Nasaf vs Navbahor	6:0	2,455
22.10.2016, 18:00	Qizilqum vs Bunyodkor	0:0	8,768
24.10.2016, 16:00	Obod vs Mash’al	0:1	471
28.10.2016, 17:00	Bunyodkor vs Metallurg	1:0	541
29.10.2016, 15:00	Neftchi vs Buxoro	0:1	2,511
29.10.2016, 15:30	Shurtan vs Obod	1:0	1,628
29.10.2016, 16:00	Navbahor vs Qizilqum	0:2	3,267
29.10.2016, 16:00	Olmaliq vs Andijon	0:0	1,088
29.10.2016, 16:00	Lokomotiv vs Nasaf	3:2	3,860
29.10.2016, 17:00	Sogdiana vs Kokand 1912	1:1	4,155
30.10.2016, 16:00	Mash’al vs Paxtakor	0:0	1,321
03.11.2016, 15:30	Qizilqum vs Lokomotiv	0:1	3,768
03.11.2016, 15:30	Andijon vs Bunyodkor	0:0	4,199
03.11.2016, 16:00	Paxtakor vs Shurtan	5:2	204
04.11.2016, 15:00	Obod vs Olmaliq	2:0	567
04.11.2016, 15:00	Kokand 1912 vs Mash’al	1:1	3,801
04.11.2016, 15:00	Metallurg vs Navbahor	5:1	2,323
04.11.2016, 16:00	Nasaf vs Neftchi	3:1	3,065
05.11.2016, 16:00	Buxoro vs Sogdiana	3:0	14,205
16.11.2016, 13:30	Obod vs Andijon	0:0	750
17.11.2016, 14:00	Neftchi vs Qizilqum	0:1	821
17.11.2016, 15:30	Mash’al vs Buxoro	2:0	6,123
17.11.2016, 16:00	Bunyodkor vs Navbahor	1:1	507
18.11.2016, 14:00	Lokomotiv vs Metallurg	4:1	4,502
18.11.2016, 15:00	Shurtan vs Kokand 1912	0:2	953
18.11.2016, 15:00	Olmaliq vs Paxtakor	0:1	1,335
19.11.2016, 14:00	Sogdiana vs Nasaf	0:3	1,322
22.11.2016	Paxtakor vs Obod	1 : 1	352
22.11.2016	Kokand 1912 vs Olmaliq	2 : 1	4,204
22.11.2016	Qizilqum vs Sogdiana	3 : 1	3,297
22.11.2016	Metallurg vs Neftchi	1 : 0	
22.11.2016	Andijon vs Navbahor	1 : 0	1,528
23.11.2016	Buxoro vs Shurtan	3 : 1	6,253
23.11.2016	Nasaf vs Mash’al	2 : 0	1,001
23.11.2016	Bunyodkor vs Lokomotiv	0 : 1	240

== Relegation play-off ==
The one leg relegation play-off match between 15th placed team of Uzbek League, Navbahor Namangan and runners-up of 2016 Uzbekistan First League, FC Naryn Khakkulabad was played on 28 November 2016 in Tashkent. Navbahor won by 3:1 and remained in League.

28 November 2016
13:00 (UTC+05:00)

Navbahor Namangan	3–1	Naryn
I.Isakjanov 23'; A.Makhmudov 29', 84'	Report	S.Dostonov 34'

TTYMI Stadium, Tashkent
Attendance: 582
Referee: B. Namazov

== Season statistics ==
=== Top goalscorers ===
As of 23 November 2016

Rank	Player	Club	Goals
1	(Uzbekistan) Temurkhuja Abdukholiqov	Lokomotiv	22 (1)
2	(Uzbekistan) Zokhid Abdullaev	Metallurg	18 (0)
3	(Uzbekistan) Shokhruz Norkhonov	Obod	14 (2)
4	(Uzbekistan) Sardor Mirzaev	Lokomotiv	13 (0)
4	(Serbia) Nemanja Jovanović	Andijon/Qizilqum	13 (3)
6	(Uzbekistan) Zafar Polvonov	Shurtan Guzar	12 (0)
6	(Uzbekistan) Marat Bikmaev	Lokomotiv	12 (1)
6	(Serbia) Dragan Ćeran	Nasaf	12 (1)
9	(Uzbekistan) Shakhboz Erkinov	Mash'al	11 (1)
9	(Uzbekistan) Igor Sergeev	Pakhtakor	11 (3)

=== Hat–tricks ===
Player	Team	Against	Result	Date
(Uzbekistan) Igor Taran	Shurtan	Sogdiana Jizzakh	4–2	7 May 2016
(Ukraine) Oleksandr Pyschur	Navbahor	Kokand 1912	5–1	14 May 2016
(Uzbekistan) Zafar Polvonov	Shurtan	Pakhtakor	3–1	20 June 2016
(Uzbekistan) Aziz Ibragimov	Andijan	Bukhoro	1–4	26 August 2016
(Uzbekistan) Kenja Turaev	Mashal	Andijan	5–0	24 September 2016
(Uzbekistan) Temurkhuja Abdukholiqov	Mashal	Lokomotiv	0–4	18 October 2016
