= 2015 Uzbekistan Super Cup =

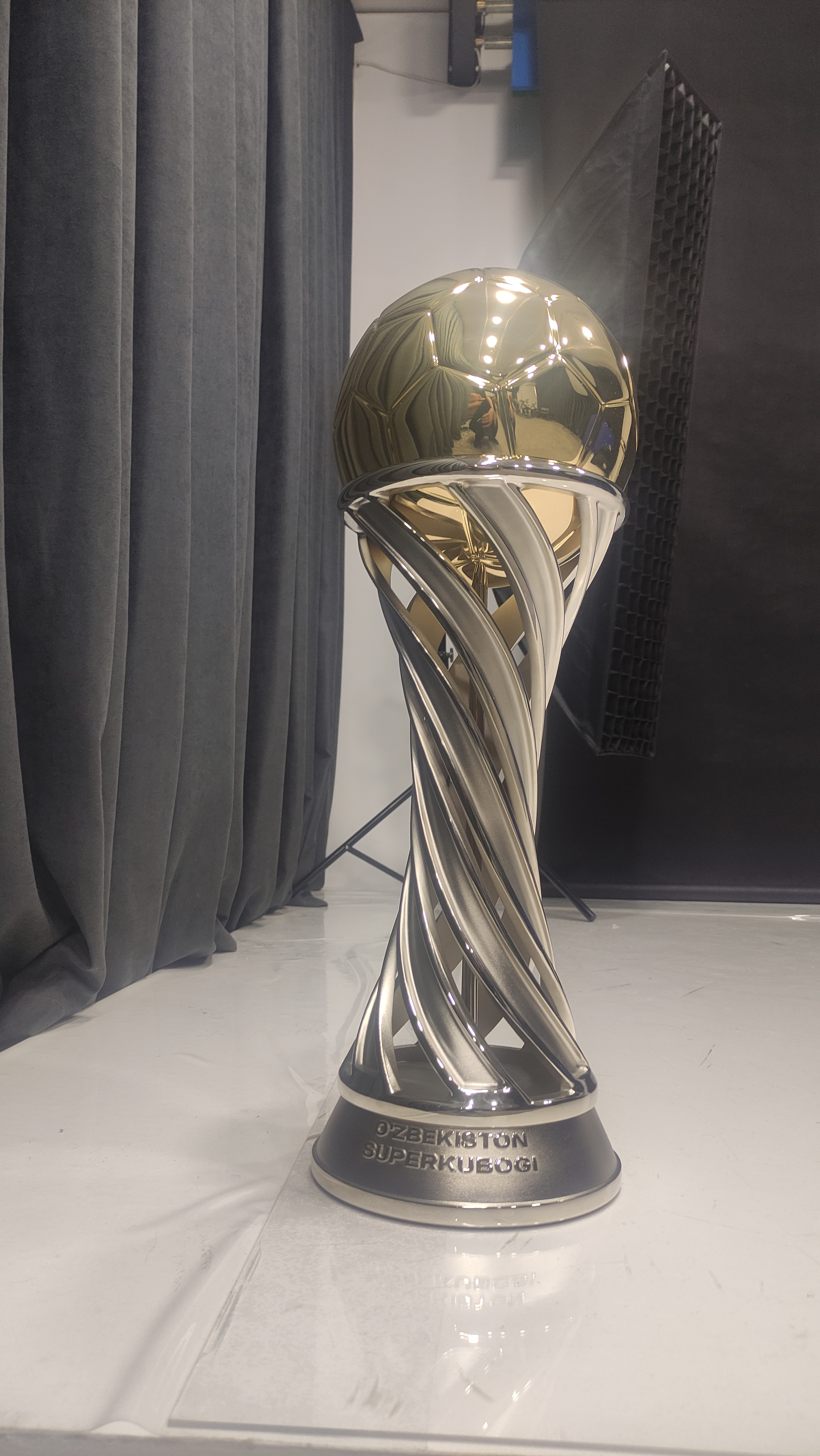
- Event: Uzbekistan Super Cup
| Pakhtakor | Lokomotiv |
| UZB | UZB |
| 0 | 4 |
- Date: 8 March 2015
- Venue: Bunyodkor Stadium, Tashkent
- Referee: Ravshan Irmatov
- Attendance: 7216
- Weather: +11 °C

The 2015 Uzbekistan Super Cup (Uzbek: Футбол бўйича 2015-йилги Ўзбекистон Суперкубоги) was the 3rd edition of the Uzbekistan Super Cup. This match featured the champions of the 2014 Uzbek League and the winners of the 2014 Uzbekistan Cup. On 8 March 2015, the reigning league champion "Pakhtakor" faced the Uzbekistan Cup winner "Lokomotiv" at Bunyodkor Stadium, with Lokomotiv winning the match 4–0.

== Match details ==
8 March 2015
14:00 UTC+05:00

| Pakhtakor | 0 — 4 | Lokomotiv |
|---|---|---|
| | Match Report | Turaev 37'; Abdukholiqov 48' Koryan 55' (pen.) Bikmaev 88' |

Bunyodkor Stadium, Tashkent
Referee: UZB Ravshan Irmatov

=== Starting lineups and substitutes ===
Pakhtakor:

- GK 12 (Uzbekistan) Aleksandr Lobanov
- DF 23 (Uzbekistan) Aleksandr Merzlyakov
- DF 2 (Uzbekistan) Egor Krimets
- DF 4 (Montenegro) Adnan Orahovac
- DF 24 (Uzbekistan) Davron Khashimov
- DF 29 (Uzbekistan) Vladimir Kozak (substituted off) 64'
- MF 7 (Georgia (country)) Kakhi Makharadze (captain)
- MF 28 (Uzbekistan) Stanislav Andreev (substituted off) 58'
- MF 10 (Uzbekistan) Jamshid Iskanderov
- FW 11 (Uzbekistan) Igor Sergeev
- FW 16 (Uzbekistan) Navruz Alimov (substituted off) 46'

Substitutes:

- GK 1 (Uzbekistan) Nikita Ribkin
- DF 5 (Uzbekistan) Akbar Ismatullaev (substituted on) 46'
- DF 6 (Uzbekistan) Murod Kholmukhamedov
- MF 8 (Uzbekistan) Sherzod Karimov (substituted on) 64'
- MF 9 (Uzbekistan) Jaloliddin Masharipov (substituted on) 58'
- MF 15 (Uzbekistan) Javokhir Sokhibov
- FW 18 (Uzbekistan) Bahodir Pardaev
- Coach: (Uzbekistan) Samvel Babayan

Lokomotiv:

- GK 12 (Uzbekistan) Maʼmur Ikromov
- DF 17 (Uzbekistan) Salim Mustafoyev
- DF 20 (Uzbekistan) Islombek Toʻxtaxoʻjayev
- MF 31 (Bosnia and Herzegovina) Nemanja Janičić
- MF 18 (Uzbekistan) Temur Kapadze (substituted off) 64'
- MF 88 (Uzbekistan) Lutfulla Turaev
- MF ? (Uzbekistan) Sardor Mirzayev
- MF 33 (Uzbekistan) Oleg Zoteev
- MF 16 (Uzbekistan) Jasur Hasanov (junior) (substituted off) 59'
- FW 11 (Uzbekistan) Temurkhuja Abdukholiqov
- FW 7 (Russia) Ruslan Koryan (substituted off) 78'

Substitutes:

- GK 30 (Uzbekistan) Sardor Qobuljonov
- DF 35 (Uzbekistan) Shavkat Mullajonov (substituted on) 59'
- MF 75 (Uzbekistan) Marat Bikmaev (substituted on) 78'
- MF 22 (Uzbekistan) Sanjar Shoakhmedov
- MF 77 (Uzbekistan) Jasur Hasanov (substituted on) 64'
- FW 70 (Uzbekistan) Alisher Shogʻulomov
- FW 99 (Montenegro) Damir Kojašević
- Coach: (Uzbekistan) Vadim Abramov

Assistant Referees:

- (Uzbekistan) Abdukhamidullo Rasulov
- (Uzbekistan) Jakhongir Saidov

Fourth Official:

- (Uzbekistan) Vadim Agishev

Match Inspector:

- (Uzbekistan) Gali Imomov
