= 2019 Uzbekistan Super Cup =

2019 Oʻzbekiston Superkubogi
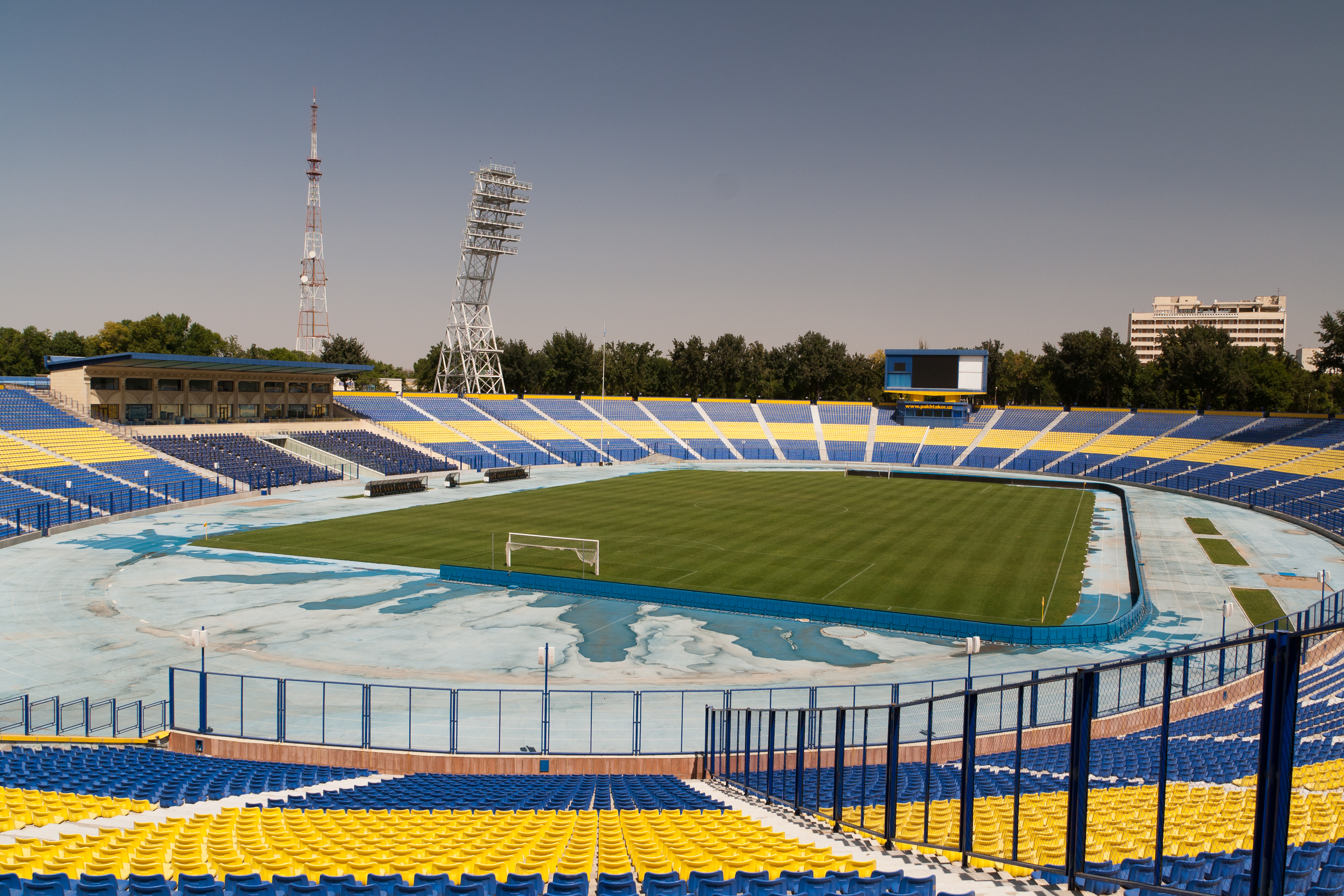
- Event: Uzbekistan Super Cup
Lokomotiv	AGMK
2	1
- Date: 23 February 2019
- Venue: Pakhtakor Central Stadium, Tashkent
- Referee: Sherzod Qosimov
- Attendance: 18,171

The 2019 Uzbekistan Super Cup (Uzbek: Футбол бўйича 2019-йилги Ўзбекистон Суперкубоги) was the 5th UzPFL Supercup. It was contested by the winners of the 2018 Uzbekistan Super League and 2018 Uzbekistan Cup. The match was contested by AGMK and Lokomotiv Tashkent, at Pakhtakor Central Stadium in Tashkent, on 23 February 2019. Lokomotiv Tashkent won the match 2–1.

== Final details ==
23 February 2019
16:00 UTC+05:00

Lokomotiv	2 – 1	AGMK
bdukholiqov 12'; Đokić 74'	Report	Polvonov 77'

Pakhtakor Central Stadium, Tashkent
Attendance: 18,171
Referee: Sherzod Qosimov

Lokomotiv	AGMK

Lokomotiv:
GK	35	(Uzbekistan) Javohir Ilyosov
DF	5	(Uzbekistan) Anzur Ismailov
DF	20	(Uzbekistan) Islom Tukhtakhodjaev
DF	24	(Uzbekistan) Davron Khashimov
DF	33	(Uzbekistan) Oleg Zoteev		(substituted off) 68'
MF	8	(Uzbekistan) Jamshid Iskanderov		(substituted off) 75'
MF	10	(Uzbekistan) Sardor Mirzayev
MF	34	(Serbia) Jovan Đokić	74'
MF	77	(Uzbekistan) Diyorjon Turapov
FW	11	(Uzbekistan) Temurkhuja Abdukholiqov	12'	(substituted off) 86'
FW	17	(Uzbekistan) Husniddin Gafurov
Substitutes:
GK		(Uzbekistan) Mamur Ikromov
DF	19	(Uzbekistan) Avazbek Ulmasaliyev
MF	7	(Uzbekistan) Azizbek Haydarov		(substituted on) 75'
MF	71	(Turkmenistan) Arslanmyrat Amanow
MF	88	(Serbia) Igor Jelić		(substituted on) 68'
FW	9	(Serbia) Filip Rajevac	(yellow card) 90+2'	(substituted on) 86'
FW	70	(Uzbekistan) Aliser Shogulyamov
Manager:
(Uzbekistan) Andrey Fyodorov

AGMK:
GK	32	(Uzbekistan) Sukhrobjon Sultonov
DF	23	(Uzbekistan) Akmal Shorahmedov
DF	31	(Uzbekistan) Saydullo Rakhmatov
DF	33	(Uzbekistan) Sardor Rakhmanov	(yellow card) 52'
DF	44	(Uzbekistan) Boburbek Yuldashov
MF	4	(Uzbekistan) Mirjamol Qosimov		(substituted off) 62'
MF	5	(Uzbekistan) Dilshod Juraev
MF	8	(Uzbekistan) Sanat Shikhov		(substituted off) 79'
MF	19	(Uzbekistan) Jasur Hasanov
MF	22	(Serbia) Miroljub Kostić		(substituted off) 40'
FW	9	(Uzbekistan) Zafar Polvonov	77'
Substitutes:
GK	45	(Uzbekistan) Akbar Turaev
DF	20	(Uzbekistan) Mirgiyoz Suleymanov
DF	28	(Uzbekistan) Abdukakhkhor Khojiakbarov
MF	11	(Uzbekistan) Zokhir Pirimov
MF	21	(Uzbekistan) Gulomkhaydar Gulyamov
MF	36	(Uzbekistan) Shokhboz Umarov		(substituted on) 79'
MF	55	(Serbia) Marko Zoćević		(substituted on) 40'
FW	15	(Uzbekistan) Jasurbek Khakimov		(substituted on) 62'
Manager:
(Uzbekistan) Mirjalol Qosimov

Assistant referees:
Sanjar Shoyusupov
Andrey Tsapenko
Fourth official:
Jasur Mukhtarov
