= 2016 Uzbekistan Super Cup =

- Event: 2016 Uzbekistan Super Cup
Nasaf	Pakhtakor
(Uzbekistan)	(Uzbekistan)
1	0
- Date: 17 February 2016
- Venue: Bunyodkor Stadium, Tashkent
- Referee: Ravshan Irmatov
- Attendance: 4,748

The 2016 Uzbekistan Super Cup (Uzbek: Futbol boʻyicha 2016-yilgi Oʻzbekiston Superkubogi) was the fourth edition of the Uzbekistan Super Cup. The match took place on 17 February at the Bunyodkor Stadium in Tashkent, between the 2015 Uzbek League champions — Pakhtakor and the 2015 Uzbekistan Cup winners — Nasaf. Nasaf won the match and claimed the Uzbekistan Super Cup title for the first time in their history.

== Match report ==
Nasaf
GK	35	(Uzbekistan) Sanjar Kuvvatov
DF	5	(Uzbekistan) Maksud Karimov
DF	20	(Uzbekistan) Sherzod Azamov
DF	24	(Uzbekistan) Erkin Boydullayev
DF	33	(Uzbekistan) Shukhrat Mukhammadiev		(substituted off) 68'
MF	8	(Uzbekistan) Saydullo Rakhmatov		(substituted off) 75'
MF	10	(Uzbekistan) Dilshod Rakhmatullaev
MF	34	(Turkmenistan) Artur Gevorkýan	74'
MF	77	(Uzbekistan) Bakhrom Abdurakhimov
FW	11	(Uzbekistan) Bobur Abdikholikov		(substituted off) 86'
FW	17	(Uzbekistan) Ilkhom Shomurodov
Substitutes:
GK		(Uzbekistan) Eldorbek Suyunov
DF	19	(Uzbekistan) Ildar Mamatkazin
MF	7	(Uzbekistan) Azamat Allaniyozov		(substituted on) 75'
MF	71	(Uzbekistan) Azizjon Ganiev
MF	88	(Serbia) Dejan Boljević		(substituted on) 68'
FW	9	(Uzbekistan) Dilshod Khushboqov	(yellow card) 90+2'	(substituted on) 86'
FW	70	(Uzbekistan) Doniyor Narzullaev
Manager:
(Uzbekistan) Ruziqul Berdiev

Pakhtakor:
GK	32	(Uzbekistan) Nikita Ribkin
DF	23	(Uzbekistan) Davron Khashimov
DF	31	(Uzbekistan) Jamshid Boltaboev
DF	33	(Uzbekistan) Kamoliddin Tajiev	(yellow card) 52'
DF	44	(Uzbekistan) Akbar Ismatullaev
MF	4	(Uzbekistan) Jamshid Iskanderov		(substituted off) 62'
MF	5	(Uzbekistan) Stanislav Andreev
MF	8	(Uzbekistan) Sherzod Karimov		(substituted off) 79'
MF	19	(Uzbekistan) Azim Akhmedov
MF	22	(Uzbekistan) Jaloliddin Masharipov		(substituted off) 40'
FW	9	(Uzbekistan) Igor Sergeev	77'
Substitutes:
GK	45	(Uzbekistan) Temur Juraev
DF	20	(Montenegro) Adnan Orahovac
DF	28	(Uzbekistan) Javokhir Sobirov
MF	11	(Uzbekistan) Javokhir Sidikov
MF	21	(Uzbekistan) Oybek Kilichev
MF	36	(Uzbekistan) Vladimir Kozak		(substituted on) 79'
MF	55	(Uzbekistan) Sukhrob Berdiyev		(substituted on) 40'
Manager:
(Uzbekistan) Numon Khasanov
