= 2023 Uzbekistan Super Cup =

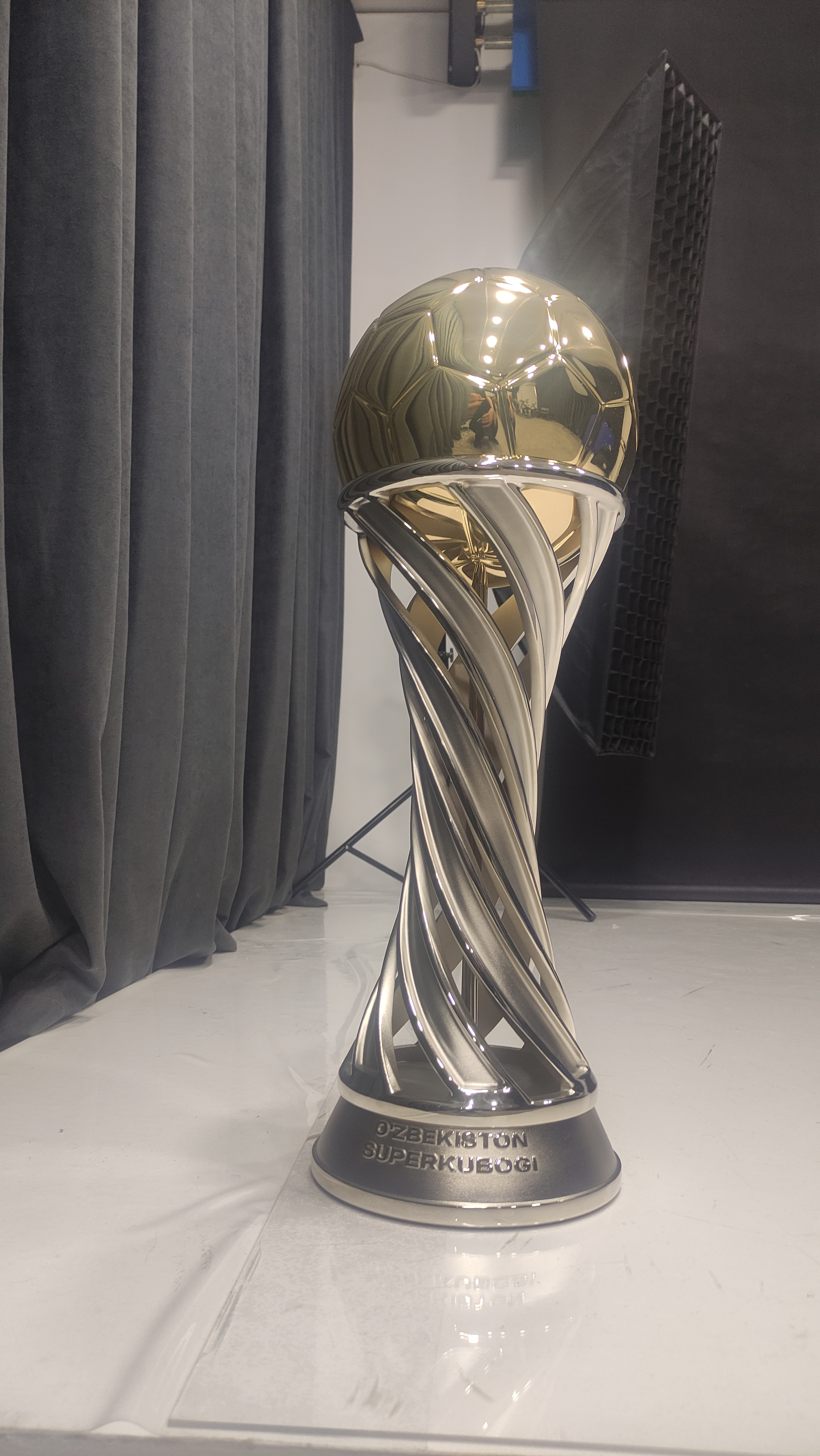
| Pakhtakor | Nasaf |
| (Uzbekistan) | (Uzbekistan) |
| 1 | 2 |
- Date: 24 August 2023
- Venue: Sogdiana Stadium, Jizzakh
- Referee: Aziz Asimov (Uzbekistan)

The 2023 Uzbekistan Super Cup (Uzbek: Футбол бўйича 2023-йилги Ўзбекистон Суперкубоги) was the 8th season of Uzbekistan Super Cup, a match held annually between the champions of the previous season’s Super League and Cup. Pakhtakor Tashkent, as the 2022 Uzbekistan Super League champion, and Nasaf, as the winner of the 2022 Uzbekistan Cup, competed in the match.

== Venue and match officials ==
The neutral venue for both teams was the "Sogdiana" Stadium in Jizzakh. Aziz Asimov was appointed as the main referee for the Super Cup.

== Match details ==
24 August 2023
19:00 UZT (UTC+5)

| Pakhtakor | 1 — 2 | Nasaf |
|---|---|---|
| Przemysław Banaszak 8' | Match report | Oybek Bozorov 42' Marko Stanojević 66' |

Sogdiana Stadium, Jizzakh
Attendance: 6,501
Referee: Aziz Asimov (Uzbekistan)

| Pakhtakor Tashkent | Nasaf Qarshi |

== See also ==
- 2023 Uzbekistan Super League
- 2023 Uzbekistan Cup
