= Temurkhuja Abdukholiqov =

Uzbekistani footballer

Personal information
- Date of birth: 25 September 1991 (age 35)
- Place of birth: Tashkent, Uzbekistan
- Height: 1.87 m (6 ft 2 in)
- Position: Forward

Team information
- Current team: Lokomotiv Tashkent
- Number: 11

Senior career*
Years	Team	Apps	(Gls)
2009–2011	Bunyodkor-2	9	(2)
2011–2014	Pakhtakor Tashkent	64	(22)
2014	Hajduk Split	10	(1)
2015–2017	Lokomotiv Tashkent	50	(30)
2017–2018	Al-Sailiya	32	(17)
2018–2019	Lokomotiv Tashkent	37	(17)
2019	Khor Fakkan	7	(0)
2020–2021	Lokomotiv Tashkent	44	(20)
2022	Qizilqum Zarafshon	23	(13)
2023	Navbahor Namangan	24	(3)
2024–2025	Bunyodkor	49	(11)
2026–	Lokomotiv Tashkent	14	(8)

International career^{‡}
2012–2013	Uzbekistan U23	9	(3)
2012–	Uzbekistan	18	(3)
- * Club domestic league appearances and goals as of 29 July 2026 ‡ National team caps and goals as of 18 March 2023

Temurkhuja "Tima" Abdukholiqov (born 25 September 1991) is an Uzbek professional footballer who plays as a forward for Lokomotiv Tashkent and the Uzbekistan national team.

== Career ==
=== Pakhtakor Tashkent ===
Abdukholiqov made his debut for FC Pakhtakor Tashkent in the Uzbek League on 5 March 2011 against Qizilqum Zarafshon in which he started and scored a goal before coming off in the 88th minute as Pakhtakor were winning 2–0. He then scored his second goal for Pakhtakor on 16 March 2011 during the AFC Champions League against Sadd Sports Club.

=== Hajduk Split ===
On 10 February 2014 he signed for Hajduk Split after a 1-week trial with the club. He became the first Uzbek player to play in Croatia. He was released in December 2014 after just 10 appearances for the club and just 3 minutes played in the first half of the 14/15 season.

== Honours ==
Pakhtakor Tashkent

- Uzbek League: 2012
- Uzbek Cup: 2011

Lokomotiv Tashkent

- Uzbek League: 2016, 2018
- Uzbek Cup: 2016
- Uzbekistan Super Cup: 2015, 2019

Individual

- Uzbek League Top Scorer: 2016 (22 goals)

== Career statistics ==
=== Club ===
As of 30 July 2019

Club	Season	League		Cup		AFC		Total	
Club	Season	Apps	Goals	Apps	Goals	Apps	Goals	Apps	Goals
Pakhtakor Tashkent	2011	24	3	6	0	5	1	35	4
Pakhtakor Tashkent	2012	21	13	6	3	5	2	32	18
Pakhtakor Tashkent	2013	19	6	4	3	6	1	29	10
Pakhtakor Tashkent	Total	64	22	16	6	16	4	96	32
Hajduk Split	2013–14	9	1	-				10	1
Hajduk Split	2014–15	2	0	1	0	-		3	0
Hajduk Split	Total	11	1	1	0	-		13	1
Lokomotiv Tashkent	2015	21	8	7	3	6	1	34	12
Lokomotiv Tashkent	2016	29	22	7	6	10	3	46	31
Lokomotiv Tashkent	Total	50	30	14	9	16	4	80	43
Al-Sailiya SC	2016–17	10	7	0	0	0	0	10	7
Al-Sailiya SC	2017–18	22	10	2	2	0	0	24	12
Al-Sailiya SC	Total	32	17	2	2	0	0	34	19
Lokomotiv Tashkent	2018	17	6	1	0	0	0	18	6
Lokomotiv Tashkent	2019	15	10	1	1	6	5	22	16
Lokomotiv Tashkent	Total	32	16	2	1	6	5	40	22
Career total		189	86	35	18	38	13	262	115

=== International goals ===
Scores and results list Uzbekistan's goal tally first.

No.	Date	Venue	Opponent	Score	Result	Competition
1.	6 June 2017	Bunyodkor Stadium, Tashkent, Uzbekistan	Thailand	1–0	2–0	Friendly
2.	7 June 2019	Milliy Stadium, Tashkent, Uzbekistan	North Korea	2–0	4–0	Friendly
3.	15 February 2021	Theyab Awana Stadium, Dubai, United Arab Emirates	Jordan	2–0	2–0	Friendly
