= Nikita Shevchenko =

Uzbek and russian footballer

Personal information
- Full name: Nikita Nikolaevich Shevchenko
- Date of birth: 27 November 2003 (age 22)
- Place of birth: Kursk, Russia
- Height: 1.90 m (6 ft 3 in)
- Position: Goalkeeper

Team information
- Current team: Lokomotiv Tashkent
- Number: 12

Youth career
- –2020: DYuSSh No.4 Kursk
- 2021: Sochi
- 2022: Lokomotiv Tashkent
- 2023: Pakhtakor

Senior career*
Years	Team	Apps	(Gls)
2023–2025	Pakhtakor	2	(0)
2026–	Lokomotiv Tashkent	0	(0)
- * Club domestic league appearances and goals as of 29 July 2026

Nikita Nikolaevich Shevchenko (Russian: Никита Николаевич Шевченко; born 27 November 2003) is an Uzbek and Russian professional footballer who plays as a goalkeeper for Lokomotiv Tashkent.

== Career ==
He made his debut in the Uzbekistan Super League for Pakhtakor on 27 April 2025 in a game against Shurtan.
