= Shuhrat Rahmonqulov =

Uzbekistani footballer and coach

Personal information
- Full name: Shukhratjon Rakhmonqulov
- Date of birth: 19 April 1971 (age 55)
- Place of birth: Namangan, Uzbek SSR, Soviet Union
- Height: 1.75 m (5 ft 9 in)
- Position: Midfielder

Senior career*
Years	Team	Apps	(Gls)
1989	Navbahor Namangan	13	(0)
1992–1994	Temiryolchi Qo'qo'n	63	(12)
1994–1997	MHSK Tashkent	101	(35)
1998–2000	Navbahor Namangan	74	(37)
2001	Pakhtakor	15	(3)
2001–2002	Nasaf	22	(6)
2002–2003	Dustlik	30	(5)
2003	Kokand 1912	14	(3)
2004	Lokomotiv Tashkent	11	(1)
2005	Dinamo Samarqand	14	(3)

International career
1996–2000	Uzbekistan	18	(5)

Managerial career
- 2010–: Pakhtakor-2
- * Club domestic league appearances and goals

Shuhrat Rahmonqulov (Uzbek: Шуҳрат Рахмонқулов; born 19 April 1971), is a former Uzbek professional footballer and coach.

== Career ==
Rahmonqulov started playing at Navbahor Namangan in 1989 in the Soviet Second League. In 1992-1994 he played for Temiryolchi Qo'qo'n. After he moved to MHSK Tashkent, uprising club in Oliy League. He won with MHSK Tashkent Oliy League champion title in 1997 and runners-up in Uzbekistan Cup in 1995. In 1998, while playing for Navbahor he won the Uzbekistan Cup and a year later he was awarded 2nd place in the Uzbekistan Footballer of the Year nomination for best player in Uzbekistan after. On 29 August 1999 in Fergana Rahmonqulov won with Navbahor Uzbekistan Super Cup in a match against 1998 champion, Pakhtakor by 4:2. He scored the first goal of Navbahor in the 20th minute.

From 1992 to 2005 he scored 105 goals in League matches and 131 goals in Cup, national team and international club competitions. The last club he played for was Dinamo Samarqand in 2005.

== International ==
He played 18 matches and scored 5 goals for the national team.

== Managing career ==
After retiring, he started a coaching career. In 2010, he was appointed as coach of Pakhtakor-2. Since 2013 he is the director of sporting school related to FC Pakhtakor.

== Honours ==
=== Club ===
MHSK Tashkent

- Uzbek League (1): 1997
- Uzbek League runner-up (1): 1995
- Uzbek Cup runner-up: 1995

Navbahor Namangan

- Uzbek Cup (1): 1998
- Uzbekistan Super Cup (1): 1999

Pakhtakor

- Uzbek League runner-up (1): 2001
- Uzbek Cup (1): 2001

=== Individual ===
- Gennadi Krasnitsky club: 134 goals
- Uzbekistan Footballer of the Year 2nd place: 1999
