= Uzbekistan Super Cup =

- Organiser(s): Uzbekistan Professional Football League
- Current champions: Neftchi (1st title) (2026)
- Most championships: Nasaf (4 titles)
- 2026 Uzbekistan Super Cup

The Uzbekistan Super Cup (Uzbek: Oʻzbekiston Superkubogi / Ўзбекистон Суперкубоги) is a one-match football competition held in Uzbekistan every year. It is contested by the winners of the Uzbekistan Super League and the Uzbekistan Cup in the previous season.

== History ==
Supercup was founded in 1999. The first edition of Cup was played in 1999 between Navbahor and Pakhtakor. This was the only played match until 2014. In January 2012 UzPFL announced that one match tournament recontested and would have been played on 11 March 2012 between Pakhtakor and Bunyodkor. On 7 March 2012 UzPFL informed that Supercup match canceled due Jar Stadiums poor ground conditions and rescheduled to be played later, but the match was not played. The second edition of Supercup was played on 7 March 2014, featuring Bunyodkor and Lokomotiv Tashkent. If the same team wins both Uzbek League and Uzbek Cup, then Super Cup is contested by the Uzbek League winner and the League runner-up. In the 2017 and 2018 seasons, it was not held for various reasons. The Super Bowl was resumed in the 2019 season. In the 2020 season, the competition was not held due to the COVID-19 pandemic. The club that has won the most victories in competitions is Nasaf. The 2019 match at Pakhtakor Stadium was attended by 18171 fans, which is a record for attendance at Super Cup matches.

== Winners ==
Season	Winner	Score	Runner-up	Venue	Attendance
29 August 1999	Navbahor; Winner of the 1998 Uzbekistan Cup	4 – 2	Pakhtakor; Winner of the 1998 Uzbek League	Pakhtakor Stadium	6,000
2000–2013	Not Held				
7 March 2014	Bunyodkor; Winner of the 2013 Uzbek League; Winner of the 2013 Uzbekistan Cup	2 – 1	Lokomotiv; Runner up in the 2013 Uzbek League	JAR Stadium	4,751
2015	Lokomotiv; Winner of 2014 Uzbekistan Cup	4 – 0	Pakhtakor; Winner of 2014 Uzbek League	Bunyodkor Stadium	7,216
2016	Nasaf; Winner of 2015 Uzbekistan Cup	1 – 0	Pakhtakor; Winner of 2015 Uzbek League	Bunyodkor Stadium	4,748
2017	Not Held				
2018	Not Held				
23 February 2019	Lokomotiv; Winner of 2018 Uzbekistan Super League	2 – 1	AGMK; Winner of 2018 Uzbekistan Cup	Pakhtakor Stadium	18,171
2020	Not Held				
6 March 2021	Pakhtakor; Winner of 2020 Uzbekistan Super League; Winner of 2020 Uzbekistan Cup	1 – 0	Nasaf; Runner up in the 2020 Uzbekistan Super League	Dinamo Stadium	5,165
27 February 2022	Pakhtakor; Winner of 2021 Uzbekistan Super League	1 – 0	Nasaf; Winner of 2021 Uzbekistan Cup	Uzbekistan Stadium	7,200
24 August 2023	Nasaf; Winner of 2022 Uzbekistan Cup	2 – 1	Pakhtakor; Winner of 2022 Uzbekistan Super League	Sogdiana Stadium	6,501
29 May 2024	Nasaf; Winner of 2023 Uzbekistan Cup	1 – 1; 4 – 3 (p)	Pakhtakor; Winner of 2023 Uzbekistan Super League	Bunyodkor Stadium	14,140
27 May 2025	Nasaf; Winner of 2024 Uzbekistan Super League	1 – 0 (details)	Andijon; Winner of 2024 Uzbekistan Cup	Bunyodkor Stadium	13,205
15 March 2026	Neftchi; Winner of 2025 Uzbekistan Super League	1 – 0 (details)	Pakhtakor; Winner of 2025 Uzbekistan Cup	Bobur Arena	16,821

== Titles by team in Super Cup ==
Team	Winner	Runner-up	Years won	Years runner-up
Nasaf	4	2	2016, 2023, 2024, 2025	2021, 2022
Pakhtakor	2	5	2021, 2022	1999, 2015, 2016, 2023, 2024
Lokomotiv	2	1	2015, 2019	2014
Navbahor	1	–	1999	–
Neftchi	1	—	2026	—
Bunyodkor	1	–	2014	–
AGMK	–	1	-	2019

== Performance by representative ==
	Winners
League champion	2
Cup winner	5
League champion & Cup winner	2

== All-time top scorers ==
Player	Teams	Goals	Matches
(Serbia) Dragan Ćeran	Pakhtakor	3	4
(Uzbekistan) Leonid Koshelev	Navbahor	2	1
(Uzbekistan) Andrey Akopyants	Pakhtakor	2	1
(Uzbekistan) Temurkhuja Abdukholiqov	Lokomotiv	2	2
(Uzbekistan) Shuhrat Rahmonqulov	Navbahor	1	1
(Uzbekistan) Saydullo Tursunov	Navbahor	1	1
(Ukraine) Oleksandr Pyshchur	Bunyodkor	1	1
(Uzbekistan) Vohid Shodiyev	Bunyodkor	1	1
(Ukraine) Vyacheslav Shevchenko	Lokomotiv	1	1
(Uzbekistan) Lutfulla Turaev	Lokomotiv	1	1
(Armenia) Ruslan Koryan	Lokomotiv	1	1
(Uzbekistan) Marat Bikmaev	Lokomotiv	1	1
(Turkmenistan) Artur Gevorkyan	Nasaf	1	1
(Serbia) Jovan Đokić	Lokomotiv	1	2
(Uzbekistan) Zafar Polvonov	AGMK	1	1
(Brazil) Ratinho	Neftchi	1	1
