= Igor Jelić =

Serbian footballer

Personal information
- Full name: Igor Jelić
- Date of birth: 28 December 1989 (age 36)
- Place of birth: Postojna, SFR Yugoslavia
- Height: 1.93 m (6 ft 4 in)
- Position: Central midfielder

Youth career
- 2004–2007: Sinđelić Beograd

Senior career*
Years	Team	Apps	(Gls)
2007–2008	Sinđelić Beograd	5	(0)
2008–2009	Voždovac	32	(2)
2010	Mladost Apatin	10	(0)
2010–2011	OFK Beograd	10	(0)
2012	Novi Pazar	1	(0)
2012–2014	Zestaponi	20	(1)
2014	Bežanija	12	(0)
2015	Donji Srem	13	(0)
2015–2016	BSK Borča	11	(1)
2016	NK Travnik	11	(2)
2017	AGMK Olmaliq	29	(5)
2018–2019	Lokomotiv Tashkent	32	(2)
2020	SHB Đà Nẵng	18	(2)
2021	Sông Lam Nghệ An	10	(0)
2022	Thanh Hóa	0	(0)
- * Club domestic league appearances and goals as of 22:32, 9 May 2020 (UTC)

Igor Jelić (Serbian Cyrillic: Игор Јелић; born 28 December 1989) is a Serbian footballer who plays as a midfielder.

== Playing career ==
After playing with Bežanija in the Serbian First League, he moved during the winter break of the 2014–15 season to Serbian SuperLiga side FK Donji Srem.

== Honours ==
=== Club ===
Zestaponi

- Georgian Super Cup: 2012

Lokomotiv

- Uzbekistan Super League: 2018
