= 2018 Uzbekistan Super League =

Uzbekistan Super League
- Season: 2018
- Champions: Lokomotiv Tashkent (3rd title)
- Relegated: Neftchi Fergana
- AFC Champions League: Lokomotiv; Pakhtakor; AGMK
- Matches: 506
- Goals: 626 (1.24 per match)
- Top goalscorer: (Brazil) Tiago Bezerra (17)
- Biggest away win: Metallurg 0-5 Pakhtakor (19 April 2018, Metallurg Bekabad Stadium)
- Highest scoring: Bukhara 4-2 AGMK (19 April 2018, Buxoro Arena)
- Longest winning run: Pakhtakor
- Longest unbeaten run: Neftchi
- Highest attendance: 25300 (Navbahor 2-0 Lokomotiv (17 March 2018, Markaziy Stadium)
- Lowest attendance: 1268 (Bunyodkor 2-0 Qizilqum (9 July 2018, Bunyodkor Stadium)

The 2018 Uzbekistan Super League (known as the Pepsi Uzbekistan Super League for sponsorship reasons, in Uzbek: Футбол бўйича 2018-йилги Ўзбекистон Суперлигаси) was the 27th season of top level football in Uzbekistan since 1992. Lokomotiv Tashkent were the defending champions from the 2017 campaign.

== Teams ==
Location of teams in 2018 Uzbekistan Super League

On 21 November 2017 according to UzPFL management decision the Uzbek League was officially renamed to Uzbekistan Super League starting from 2018 season. The number of teams playing in top division of Uzbek football is reduced from 16 to 12.

The draw for the 2018 Super League season was held on 3 February 2018. The first matchday is scheduled for 1 March 2018.

Sementchi, the winner of 2017 Uzbekistan First League did not participate in new Super League season. The club failed to pass licensing procedures like Mash'al Mubarek. These both clubs have been replaced by Neftchi Fergana and Sogdiana Jizzakh which according to 2017 season have been relegated to First League.

Club	Coach	Location	Stadium	Capacity	Kit sponsor
AGMK	(Russia) Viktor Kumykov	Olmaliq	AGMK Stadium	12,000	Adidas
Bunyodkor	(Uzbekistan) Mirjalol Qosimov	Tashkent	Bunyodkor Stadium	34,000	Jako
Bukhoro	(Uzbekistan) Ulughbek Baqayev	Bukhara	Bukhara Arena	22,700	Macron
Kokand 1912	(Uzbekistan) Numon Hasanov	Kokand	Kokand Stadium	10,500	Joma
Lokomotiv	(Russia) Andrey Fyodorov	Tashkent	Lokomotiv Stadium	8,000	Joma
Metallurg	(Uzbekistan) Andrey Shipilov	Bekabad	Metallurg Stadium	15,000	Joma
Nasaf	(Uzbekistan) Ruziqul Berdiyev	Qarshi	Qarshi Markazi Stadium	16,000	Adidas
Navbahor	(Uzbekistan) Ilkhom Muminjonov	Namangan	Namangan Markazi Stadium	22,000	Jako
Neftchi	(Uzbekistan) Sergey Kovshov	Ferghana	Istiqlol Stadium	20,000	Joma
Pakhtakor	(Georgia (country)) Shota Arveladze	Tashkent	Pakhtakor Stadium	35,000	Adidas
Sogdiana	(Russia) Sergey Lushan	Jizzakh	Soghdiana Stadium	11,650	Joma
Qizilqum	(Uzbekistan) Hamidjon Aktamov	Zarafshan	Progress Stadium	12,500	Joma

=== Managerial changes ===
Team	Outgoing manager	Manner of departure	Date of vacancy	Position in table	Replaced by	Date of appointment
Metallurg	(Uzbekistan) Rustam Mirsodikov	Resigned	25 December 2017	Pre-season	(Uzbekistan) Andrey Shipilov	25 December 2017
Sogdiana	(Uzbekistan) Igor Shkvyrin	Resigned	27 December 2017	Pre-season	(Uzbekistan) Alexander Mochinov	27 December 2017
Neftchi	(Uzbekistan) Vadim Abramov		27 December 2017	Pre-season	(Uzbekistan) Sergey Kovshov	27 January 2018
Sogdiana	(Uzbekistan) Alexander Mochinov	Sacked	7 April 2018	12th	(Russia) Sergey Lushan	7 April 2018
Lokomotiv	(Uzbekistan) Andrey Miklyaev	Resigned	19 April 2018	10th	(Russia) Andrey Fyodorov	19 April 2018

== Foreign players ==
The number of foreign players is restricted to five per USL team. A team can use only five foreign players on the field in each game.

Club	Player 1	Player 2	Player 3	Player 4	AFC Player	Former Player
AGMK	(Serbia) Miloš Trifunović	(Serbia) Vladimir Bubanja	(Serbia) **Jovan Đokić**	(Belarus) Vladislav Kosmynin	(Kyrgyzstan) **Pavel Matyash**	(Moldova) **Vadim Cemirtan**
Bunyodkor	(Serbia) Filip Rajevac					
Bukhara	(Russia) Vlad Larinov	(Moldova) **Vadim Cemirtan**			(Turkmenistan) **Arslanmyrat Amanow**	(Belarus) Sergey Rusetsky (Serbia) Marko Klisura
Kokand 1912	(Serbia) Darko Gojkovic	(Serbia) Marko Milič				(Serbia) Milan Spremo
Lokomotiv Tashkent	(Georgia (country)) **Kakha Makharadze**	(Serbia) Igor Jelić	(Russia) Nikolai Pogrebnyak			(Brazil) Nivaldo (South Korea) Cho Suk-jae
Metallurg Bekabad	(Russia) Andrei Shipilov				(Tajikistan) **Zoir Juraboev**	
Nasaf						(Russia) Igor Golban (Serbia) Dragan Ceran (Serbia) Slavko Lukic (Tajikistan) **Jahongir Aliev**
Navbahor	(Serbia) Darko Stanojević	(Serbia) Tomislav Pajović	(Montenegro) **Darko Nikač**	(Russia) Igor Golban		(Serbia) Nenad Injac
Neftchi Ferghana	(Russia) Vyacheslav Sushkin	(Ukraine) Vitali Myrnyi				
Pakhtakor	(Montenegro) **Marko Simić**	(Guinea-Bissau) **Esmaël Gonçalves**	(Brazil) Tiago Bezerra	(Serbia) Dragan Ceran	(Australia) Rostyn Griffiths	
Soghdiana	(Lithuania) **Darvydas Šernas**	(Serbia) Miloš Simonović	(Serbia) Nikola Milinković	(Serbia) Milan Mitrović	(South Korea) Kim Dong-hee	
Qizilqum	(Georgia (country)) **Elgujja Grigalashvili**	(Georgia (country)) Giorgi Kvesieshvili	(Serbia) Nemanja Jovanovic	(Russia) Yevgeni Cheremisin	(Turkmenistan) **Artur Gevorkyan**	

In bold: Players that have been capped for their national team.

== Regular stage ==
Pos	Team	Pld	W	D	L	GF	GA	GD	Pts	Qualification or relegation
1	Pakhtakor	22	14	5	3	36	12	+24	47	Qualification to Championship Round
2	Lokomotiv	22	11	7	4	35	21	+14	40	Qualification to Championship Round
3	Bunyodkor	22	12	4	6	35	26	+9	40	Qualification to Championship Round
4	Navbahor	22	11	4	7	29	18	+11	37	Qualification to Championship Round
5	Metallurg	22	9	6	7	24	29	−5	33	Qualification to Championship Round
6	Bukhoro	22	10	2	10	23	28	−5	32	Qualification to Championship Round
7	Kokand 1912	22	7	7	8	21	20	+1	28	Relegation Round
8	AGMK	22	7	5	10	26	28	−2	26	Relegation Round
9	Nasaf	22	6	8	8	21	28	−7	26	Relegation Round
10	Qizilqum	22	7	2	13	20	29	−9	23	Relegation Round
11	Sogdiana	22	4	5	13	17	32	−15	17	Relegation Round
12	Neftchi	22	2	9	11	12	28	−16	15	Relegation Round

Source: Uzbekistan Professional Football League
Rules for classification: 1) points; 2) goal difference; 3) number of goals scored

== Championship round ==
Teams keep records from regular stage (10 matches) against championship round opponents.

Pos	Team	Pld	W	D	L	GF	GA	GD	Pts	Qualification or relegation
1	Lokomotiv (C)	20	14	4	2	37	17	+20	46	Qualification to the 2019 AFC Champions League group stage
2	Pakhtakor	20	11	4	5	38	17	+21	37	Qualification to the 2019 AFC Champions League preliminary round 2
3	Navbahor	20	9	4	7	20	18	+2	31	
4	Bunyodkor	20	8	3	9	26	26	0	27	
5	Metallurg	20	5	4	11	12	28	−16	19	
6	Bukhoro	20	3	1	16	14	41	−27	10	

Source: Uzbekistan Professional Football League
Rules for classification: 1) points; 2) goal difference; 3) number of goals scored
(C) Champions

=== Table of matches ===
Date and time (UZT)	Home team	Score	Away team	Attendance
01.03.2018, 18:00	Qizilqum	0 : 3	Lokomotiv	11,814
01.03.2018, 20:00	Neftchi	0 : 0	Nasaf	19,632
02.03.2018, 20:00	Pakhtakor	2 : 0	Sogdiana	15,026
03.03.2018, 17:30	Bukhara	1 : 0	Kokand 1912	13,448
03.03.2018, 20:00	Bunyodkor	1 : 1	OKMK	12,475
04.03.2018, 15:30	Metallurg	0 : 0	Navbahor	8,175
08.03.2018, 18:00	OKMK	1 : 2	Navbahor	8,320
08.03.2018, 20:00	Qizilqum	0 : 2	Kokand 1912	7,302
09.03.2018, 18:00	Nasaf	3 : 1	Bukhara	10,386
09.03.2018, 20:00	Lokomotiv	1 : 1	Metallurg	3,158
10.03.2018, 17:30	Bunyodkor	1 : 0	Pakhtakor	20,168
10.03.2018, 20:00	Sogdiana	0 : 0	Neftchi	8,512
16.03.2018, 18:00	Metallurg	1 : 0	Kokand 1912	5,641
16.03.2018, 20:00	Bukhara	3 : 0	Sogdiana	14,802
17.03.2018, 18:00	Neftchi	0 : 1	Bunyodkor	18,051
17.03.2018, 20:00	Navbahor	2 : 0	Lokomotiv	25,300
18.03.2018, 18:00	Pakhtakor	2 : 1	OKMK	12,852
18.03.2018, 18:00	Qizilqum	1 : 2	Nasaf	8,565
29.03.2018, 18:00	Sogdiana	1 : 3	Qizilqum	9,380
30.03.2018, 18:00	Bunyodkor	3 : 1	Bukhara	15,421
30.03.2018, 20:00	Nasaf	1 : 1	Metallurg	14,300
31.03.2018, 18:00	Kokand 1912	1 : 0	Navbahor	12,278
31.03.2018, 20:00	Pakhtakor	3 : 0	Neftchi	15,023
31.03.2018, 20:27	OKMK	1 : 0	Lokomotiv	8,430
05.04.2018, 18:00	Neftchi	1–3	OKMK	11,121
05.04.2018, 20:00	Qizilqum	0–1	Bunyodkor	11,253
06.04.2018, 18:00	Bukhara	1–0	Pakhtakor	15,150
06.04.2018, 20:00	Metallurg	2–0	Sogdiana	7,416
07.04.2018, 18:00	Lokomotiv	1–1	Kokand 1912	3,123
07.04.2018, 20:00	Navbahor	0–0	Nasaf	15,540
11.04.2018, 18:00	Bunyodkor	3–1	Metallurg	11,980
11.04.2018, 18:00	Sogdiana	3–2	Navbahor	7,226
11.04.2018, 20:00	Nasaf	2–1	Lokomotiv	13,071
12.04.2018, 18:00	OKMK	0–0	Kokand 1912	8,977
12.04.2018, 18:00	Pakhtakor	2–1	Qizilqum	10,241
12.04.2018, 20:00	Neftchi	0–1	Bukhara	14,200
19.04.2018, 18:00	Metallurg	0–5	Pakhtakor	8,150
19.04.2018, 20:00	Bukhara	4–2	OKMK	15,525
20.04.2018, 18:00	Navbahor	2–1	Bunyodkor	21,600
20.04.2018, 20:00	Qizilqum	1–0	Neftchi	11,450
21.04.2018, 18:00	Kokand 1912	0–0	Nasaf	11,056
21.04.2018, 20:00	Lokomotiv	2–0	Sogdiana	3,148
24.04.2018, 18:00	Neftchi	0–0	Metallurg	8,102
24.04.2018, 20:00	Bukhara	1–0	Qizilqum	20,631
25.04.2018, 18:30	Pakhtakor	1–0	Navbahor	17,465
25.04.2018, 20:30	Sogdiana	1–1	Kokand 1912	7,942
26.04.2018, 18:00	OKMK	0–0	Nasaf	8,745
26.04.2018, 20:30	Bunyodkor	1–2	Lokomotiv	19,452
25.05.2018, 18:49	Neftchi	0–2	Sogdiana	2,563
25.05.2018, 18:59	Pakhtakor	1–0	Bunyodkor	23,456
26.05.2018, 18:45	Kokand 1912	0–1	Qizilqum	5,847
26.05.2018, 18:50	Navbahor	1–0	OKMK	10,800
26.05.2018, 19:00	Metallurg	2–0	Lokomotiv	6,325
26.05.2018, 19:22	Bukhara	1–0	Nasaf	18,301
12.07.2018, 19:00	Sogdiana	3–0	Bukhara	5,360
12.07.2018, 20:00	Bunyodkor	2–1	Neftchi	1,064
12.07.2018, 21:00	OKMK	0–1	Pakhtakor	4,425
13.07.2018, 00:29	Nasaf	0–0	Qizilqum	2,118
13.07.2018, 19:00	Lokomotiv	3–1	Navbahor	2,278
13.07.2018, 20:00	Kokand 1912	2–1	Metallurg	4,827
10.06.2018, 19:02	Navbahor	3–0	Kokand 1912	11,350
11.06.2018, 19:30	Qizilqum	2–0	Sogdiana	7,553
12.06.2018, 19:03	Neftchi	1–1	Pakhtakor	3,815
12.06.2018, 19:11	Metallurg	2–2	Nasaf	7,200
12.06.2018, 19:11	Lokomotiv	2–1	OKMK	4,180
12.06.2018, 19:32	Bukhara	2–2	Bunyodkor	18,891
08.07.2018, 19:00	Pakhtakor	2–0	Bukhara	7,557
08.07.2018, 20:00	OKMK	2–2	Neftchi	3,420
08.07.2018, 21:00	Nasaf	1–1	Navbahor	3,126
09.07.2018, 19:00	Kokand 1912	1–2	Lokomotiv	5,850
09.07.2018, 20:00	Sogdiana	0–1	Metallurg	4,300
09.07.2018, 21:00	Bunyodkor	2–0	Qizilqum	1,286
18.07.2018, 20:00	Kokand 1912	3 – 0	OKMK	4,936
18.07.2018, 21:00	Lokomotiv	3 – 1	Nasaf	2,312
18.07.2018, 21:00	Qizilqum	1 – 2	Pakhtakor	7,558
19.07.2018, 20:00	Metallurg	1 – 1	Bunyodkor	7,241
19.07.2018, 20:00	Bukhara	0 – 0	Neftchi	7,851
19.07.2018, 21:00	Navbahor	2 – 0	Sogdiana	11,237
23.07.2018, 19:00	OKMK	2 – 0	Bukhara	3,422
23.07.2018, 20:00	Pakhtakor	3 – 0	Metallurg	6,122
23.07.2018, 21:00	Nasaf	1 – 0	Kokand 1912	2,108
24.07.2018, 19:00	Sogdiana	0 – 0	Lokomotiv	5,660
24.07.2018, 20:00	Neftchi	0 – 1	Qizilqum	4,153
24.07.2018, 21:00	Bunyodkor	2 – 1	Navbahor	9,741
28.07.2018, 20:00	Metallurg	1 – 0	Neftchi	5,415
28.07.2018, 20:00	Navbahor	1 – 0	Pakhtakor	21,450
28.07.2018, 20:00	Nasaf	0 – 2	OKMK	2,194
29.07.2018, 19:00	Kokand 1912	2 – 1	Sogdiana	3,978
29.07.2018, 20:00	Qizilqum	0 – 1	Bukhara	6,588
29.07.2018, 21:00	Lokomotiv	3 – 1	Bunyodkor	5,722
01.08.2018, 19:00	Sogdiana	0 – 1	Nasaf	5,700
01.08.2018, 20:00	OKMK	3 – 0	Qizilqum	3,188
01.08.2018, 21:00	Pakhtakor	1 – 1	Lokomotiv	16,280
02.08.2018, 19:00	Neftchi	2 – 1	Navbahor	7,241
02.08.2018, 20:00	Bukhara	2 – 1	Metallurg	12,000
02.08.2018, 21:00	Bunyodkor	1 – 3	Kokand 1912	3,174
11.08.2018 18:00	Sogdiana	1:3	OKMK	2,308
11.08.2018 20:00	Nasaf	1:4	Bunyodkor	3,146
11.08.2018 20:00	Lokomotiv	1:1	Neftchi	2,412
12.08.2018 18:30	Metallurg	2:1	Qizilqum	5,700
12.08.2018 18:30	Qo‘qon-1912	1:1	Paxtakor	8,130
12.08.2018 20:30	Navbahor	2:0	Bukhara	14,186
17.08.2018 20:30	Bunyodkor	2:2	Sogdiana	527
17.08.2018 20:30	Neftchi	1:0	Qo‘qon-1912	5,446
17.08.2018 20:30	OKMK	2:3	Metallurg	3,840
17.08.2018 20:30	Bukhara	0:1	Lokomotiv	15,480
18.08.2018 20:00	Paxtakor	4:0	Nasaf	7,341
18.08.2018 20:00	Qizilqum	2:0	Navbahor	3,400
13.09.2018 18:00	Qo‘qon-1912	1:1	Nasaf	2,682
13.09.2018 20:00	Sogdiana	2:2	Qizilqum	2,437
14.09.2018 18:00	Metallurg	0:1	Lokomotiv	6,712
14.09.2018 20:00	Navbahor	3:3	Paxtakor	22,650
15.09.2018 18:00	OKMK	0:1	Neftchi	2,825
15.09.2018 20:00	Bunyodkor	3:0	Bukhara	4,250

== Relegation round ==
Teams keep records from regular stage (10 matches) against relegation round opponents.

Pos	Team	Pld	W	D	L	GF	GA	GD	Pts	Qualification or relegation
7	Nasaf	20	9	7	4	24	16	+8	34	
8	Qizilqum	20	9	4	7	26	26	0	31	
9	Kokand 1912	20	7	7	6	21	14	+7	28	
10	AGMK	20	7	6	7	25	23	+2	27	Qualification to the 2019 AFC Champions League preliminary round 2 and relegation play-off
11	Sogdiana	20	6	6	8	18	23	−5	24	Relegation play-off
12	Neftchi (R)	20	4	6	10	14	26	−12	18	Relegation to Uzbekistan Pro League

Source: Uzbekistan Professional Football League
Rules for classification: 1) points; 2) goal difference; 3) number of goals scored
(R) Relegated

== Relegation play-off ==
3 December 2018
14:00 UTC+5

Sogdiana	3–1	Mash'al
Shohruz Norkhonov 38'; Darvydas Šernas 46'; Oybek Nurmatov 73'	Report	Sardor Rakhmanov 79' (pen.)

Pakhtakor Markaziy Stadium, Tashkent
Attendance: 76
Referee: Sherzod Kasymov

4 December 2018
14:00 UTC+5

AGMK	1–0	Istiqlol
Uladzislaw Kasmynin 77'	Report

Lokomotiv Stadium, Tashkent
Attendance: 217
Referee: Aziz Asimov

Sogdiana and AGMK will play in 2019 Uzbekistan Super League next season.

== Season statistics ==
=== Top scorers ===
.

As of November 2018

#	Player	Club	Goals
1	(Brazil) Tiago Bezerra	Pakhtakor	17
2	(Guinea-Bissau) Esmaël Gonçalves	Pakhtakor	16
3	(Uzbekistan) Marat Bikmaev	Lokomotiv	14
4	(Uzbekistan) Bobur Abdikholikov	Nasaf	13
5	(Serbia) Jovan Đokić	AGMK	11
5	(Uzbekistan) Murod Kholmukhamedov	Kokand 1912	11
5	(Uzbekistan) Jovlon Ibrokhimov	Bunyodkor	11
