= Leonid Koshelev =

Russian-Uzbekistani football midfielder (born 1979)

Personal information
- Full name: Leonid Aleksandrovich Koshelev
- Date of birth: 20 December 1979 (age 46)
- Place of birth: Tashkent, Soviet Union
- Height: 1.78 m (5 ft 10 in)
- Position: Midfielder

Team information
- Current team: NBU Osiyo

Senior career*
Years	Team	Apps	(Gls)
1997–2000	Navbahor Namangan	85	(22)
2001–2004	Pakhtakor Tashkent	102	(38)
2005	Shinnik Yaroslavl	6	(1)
2005–2006	Pakhtakor Tashkent	12	(8)
2006	Shinnik Yaroslavl	8	(0)
2007	Pakhtakor Tashkent		
2008	FK Dinamo Samarqand		
2009	Shurtan Guzar		
2009–2011	Qizilqum Zarafshon	48	(7)
2012	FK Dinamo Samarqand	22	(3)
2013	Navbahor Namangan	20	(3)
2014	NBU Osiyo		

International career^{‡}
1999–2007	Uzbekistan	43	(6)
- * Club domestic league appearances and goals as of 8 November 2013 ‡ National team caps and goals as of 12 March 2013

Leonid Koshelev (Russian: Леони́д Алекса́ндрович Ко́шелев, Leonid Aleksandrovich Koshelev; born 20 December 1979) is a Russian-Uzbekistani football midfielder. He currently plays for NBU Osiyo.

== Career ==
He started playing in Navbahor Namangan in 1997, spending 4 seasons. In 2001 Koshelev moved to Pakhtakor Tashkent. In February 2013 he moved from FK Dinamo Samarqand back to his former club Navbahor Namangan. In February 2014 he joined NBU Osiyo.

== International ==
He made his debut in the national team on 11 July 1999 in friendly match against Malaysia in Samarkand. He played 43 matches for national team and scored 6 goals.

== Honours ==
Navbahor Namangan

- Uzbek Cup (1): 1998
- Uzbek Supercup(1): 1999

Pakhtakor

- Uzbek League (5): 2002, 2003, 2004, 2005, 2007
- Uzbek Cup (4): 2001, 2002, 2003, 2004
- CIS Cup: 2007

== Career statistics ==
=== National team ===
Goals for Senior National Team

#	Date	Venue	Opponent	Score	Result	Competition
1	30 June 2001	Kuala Lumpur, Malaysia	Bosnia and Herzegovina	2–1	Won	Merdeka Cup
2	17 November 2003	Bangkok, Thailand	Tajikistan	4–1	Won	2004 AFC Asian Cup qualification
3	21 November 2003	Bangkok, Thailand	Thailand	1–4	Lost	2004 AFC Asian Cup qualification
4	31 March 2004	Taipei, Taiwan	Chinese Taipei	1–0	Won	2006 FIFA World Cup qualification
5	17 November 2004	Tashkent, Uzbekistan	Chinese Taipei	6–1	Won	2006 FIFA World Cup qualification
6	15 November 2006	Tashkent, Uzbekistan	Qatar	2–0	Won	2007 AFC Asian Cup qualification
