= PFC Lokomotiv Tashkent =

Uzbek football club

Lokomotiv Tashkent
- Full name: Professional Football Club Lokomotiv Tashkent
- Nicknames: Uzbek: Temiryo'lchilar (Railroaders); Uzbek: Loko
- Founded: February 18, 2002; 24 years ago
- Ground: Lokomotiv Stadium
- Capacity: 7,651
- Manager: Mirko Jeličić
- League: Uzbekistan Super League
- Website: lokomotiv.uz
| Home colours | Away colours |

PFC Lokomotiv Tashkent (Uzbek: Профессионал футбол Клуби Локомотив Тошкент) is an Uzbek professional football club based in Tashkent.

The owner and main sponsor of the club is the state-owned Uzbek Railways.

== History ==
Lokomotiv was founded in 18 February 2002. In 2002–2003 the club played in the second division of Uzbek Football – First League and from 2004 to 2010 in Uzbek League. In the 2009 season Lokomotiv, led by Vadim Abramov reached 6th position in league.

In 2010 Lokomotiv finished 13th and were relegated to the First League. In 2011, they gained promotion to Uzbek League again, winning the 2011 First League season.

On 12 December 2011, Khoren Hovhannisyan was appointed as new head coach.

In June 2012 Khoren Oganesian left the club after his contract expired and Ravshan Muqimov was appointed as coach. At the end of the 2012 season the club finished 3rd after Pakhtakor Tashkent and Bunyodkor. This was the club's 2nd best performance in the league and qualified to play in the 2013 AFC Champions League for the first time. In the 2013 AFC Champions League qualifying play-off round Lokomotiv played against Al Nasr based in Dubai but Lokomotiv lost 3–2 and failed to qualify for the group stage of tournament.

In 2013 season Lokomotiv Tashkent finished 2nd after Bunyodkor for the first time in club's history and gained promotion to 2014 AFC Champions League play-off. On 9 February 2014 in 2014 AFC Champions League qualifying play-off round match in Tashkent against Al-Kuwait Lokomotiv lost with score 1:3 and finished its participation in the tournament. On 1 July 2014 in Uzbek Cup semi-final Lokomotiv overcame Pakhtakor in two leg competition by 3:2 and to play in Cup Final against Bunyodkor. In 2014 Cup Final match on 12 November 2014 in Olmaliq, Lokomotiv overcame Bunyodkor by 1:0 and won the trophy for the first time in its first Cup Final. The only goal scored in 106' midfielder Jasur Hasanov. In Uzbek League club finished 2014 season again as runners-up after Pakhtakor like the previous season.

On 8 March 2015, in Supercup match against Pakhtakor, Lokomotiv overcame by 4–0 and won its first SuperCup after a disappointing loss to Bunyodkor in 2014. In 2016 Lokomotiv made double by winning League and Uzbek Cup. Lokomotiv won 2016 League and became the champions for the first time in its history after three consequent seasons finishing as runners-up (2013-2015).

In 2017 Lokomotiv made its second double, winning second champions title and Cup.

=== Crest ===
Old logo

Former logo

=== Domestic ===
| Season | League | | | | | | | | | | Cup | Super Cup | Asia | | Top scorer | |
| Season | Division | P | W | D | L | F | A | GD | Pts | Pos. | Cup | Super Cup | Comp. | Result | Name | Goals |
|---|---|---|---|---|---|---|---|---|---|---|---|---|---|---|---|---|
| 2002 | Pro League (2) | 32 | 15 | 5 | 12 | 48 | 36 | 12 | 50 | 8th | —N/a | — | — | | —N/a | —N/a |
| 2003 | ↑ Pro League (2) | 28 | 20 | 3 | 5 | 78 | 22 | 56 | 63 | 2nd | First round | — | — | | Ravshan Bozorov | 19 |
| 2004 | Super League (1) | 26 | 10 | 6 | 10 | 37 | 35 | 2 | 36 | 6th | Quarter-finals | — | — | | Marsel Idiatullin | 7 |
| 2005 | Super League (1) | 26 | 9 | 3 | 14 | 39 | 46 | –7 | 30 | 10th | Quarter-finals | — | — | | Marsel Idiatullin | 11 |
| 2006 | Super League (1) | 30 | 10 | 8 | 12 | 39 | 55 | –16 | 38 | 9th | Round of 16 | — | — | | Marsel Idiatullin | 13 |
| 2007 | Super League (1) | 30 | 6 | 8 | 16 | 25 | 44 | –19 | 26 | 14th | Round of 32 | — | — | | Ilkhom Muminjonov | 5 |
| 2008 | Super League (1) | 30 | 11 | 4 | 15 | 41 | 38 | 3 | 37 | 8th | Round of 32 | — | — | | Marsel Idiatullin | 8 |
| 2009 | Super League (1) | 30 | 11 | 9 | 10 | 34 | 40 | –6 | 42 | 6th | Round of 32 | — | — | | —N/a | —N/a |
| 2010 | ↓ Super League (1) | 26 | 6 | 5 | 15 | 20 | 38 | –18 | 23 | 13th | Semi-finals | — | — | | Olim Navkarov | 6 |
| 2011 | ↑ Pro League (2) | 30 | 25 | 4 | 1 | 102 | 11 | 91 | 79 | 1st | Round of 16 | — | — | | Zayniddin Tadjiyev | 30 |
| 2012 | Super League (1) | 26 | 14 | 7 | 9 | 43 | 22 | 21 | 49 | 3rd | Quarter-finals | — | — | | Zayniddin Tadjiyev | 11 |
| 2013 | Super League (1) | 26 | 19 | 3 | 4 | 63 | 21 | 42 | 60 | 2nd | Semi-finals | — | ACL | Play-off | Farhod Tadjiyev | 17 |
| 2014 | Super League (1) | 26 | 20 | 4 | 2 | 58 | 21 | 37 | 64 | 2nd | Winner | Runners-up | ACL | Play-off | Farhod Tadjiyev | 13 |
| 2015 | Super League (1) | 30 | 23 | 5 | 2 | 66 | 22 | 44 | 74 | 2nd | Semi-finals | Winner | ACL | Group stage | Sanjar Shaakhmedov | 14 |
| 2016 | Super League (1) | 30 | 23 | 5 | 2 | 77 | 24 | 53 | 74 | 1st | Winner | — | ACL | Quarter-finals | Temurkhuja Abdukholiqov | 22 |
| 2017 | Super League (1) | 30 | 22 | 4 | 4 | 67 | 20 | 47 | 70 | 1st | Winner | — | ACL | Group stage | Marat Bikmaev | 27 |
| 2018 | Super League (1) | 20 | 14 | 4 | 2 | 37 | 17 | 20 | 46 | 1st | Quarterfinal | — | ACL | Group stage | Marat Bikmaev | 14 |
| 2019 | Super League (1) | 26 | 13 | 10 | 3 | 40 | 17 | 23 | 49 | 2nd | Round of 16 | Winner | ACL | Group stage | Temurkhuja Abdukholiqov | 11 |
| 2020 | Super League (1) | 26 | 10 | 5 | 11 | 28 | 38 | -10 | 35 | 10th | Round of 16 | - | ACL | Preliminary round 2 | Temurkhuja Abdukholiqov; Marat Bikmaev | 6 |
| 2021 | Super League (1) | 26 | 11 | 6 | 9 | 37 | 32 | +5 | 39 | 7th | Round of 16 | - | — | | Temurkhuja Abdukholiqov | 14 |
| 2022 | ↓ Super League (1) | 26 | 6 | 6 | 14 | 22 | 36 | -14 | 24 | 12th | Quarterfinal | - | — | | Jerome Etame | 5 |
| 2023 | ↑ Pro League (2) | 20 | 15 | 3 | 2 | 40 | 11 | +29 | 48 | 1st | Round of 16 | - | — | | (Tajikistan) Rustam Soirov | 8 |
| 2024 | ↓ Super League (1) | 26 | 5 | 6 | 15 | 28 | 44 | −16 | 21 | 14th | Group Stage | - | — | | | |
| 2025 | ↑ Pro League (2) | 20 | 12 | 5 | 3 | 37 | 15 | +22 | 41 | 1st | Group Stage | - | — | | | |

| Winner | Runners-up | Third place | Promoted | Relegated |

- (1), (2). Brackets with numbers inside indicates the level of division within the Uzbek football league system
- N/A = No answer

=== Continental ===
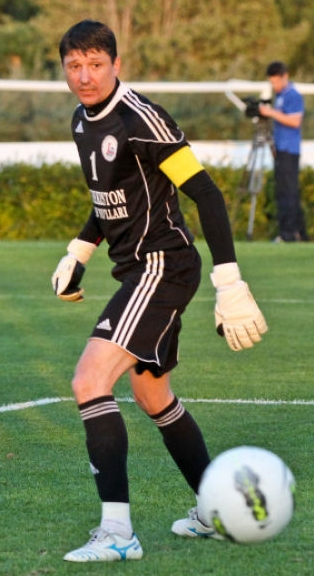
Goalkeeper of Lokomotiv Pavel Bugalo in 2011–13

As of match played 21 January 2020

| Competition | Pld | W | D | L | GF | GA |
|---|---|---|---|---|---|---|
| AFC Champions League | 37 | 9 | 11 | 17 | 51 | 57 |
| Total | 37 | 9 | 11 | 17 | 51 | 57 |

AFC Champions League
| Date | Round | Result | Team | Venue | Season |
|---|---|---|---|---|---|
| 9 February 2013 | Play-off | 2–3 | (United Arab Emirates) Al-Nasr | Dubai, United Arab Emirates | 2013 AFC Champions League |
| 9 February 2014 | Play-off | 1–3 | Al-Kuwait | Tashkent, Uzbekistan | 2014 AFC Champions League |
| 25 February 2015 | Group stage | 1–3 | (Saudi Arabia) Al-Hilal | Riyadh, Saudi Arabia | 2015 AFC Champions League |
| 4 March 2015 | Group stage | 1–1 | (Iran) Foolad | Tashkent, Uzbekistan | 2015 AFC Champions League |
| 17 March 2015 | Group stage | 2–6 | (Qatar) Al-Sadd | Doha, Qatar | 2015 AFC Champions League |
| 8 April 2015 | Group stage | 5–0 | (Qatar) Al-Sadd | Tashkent, Uzbekistan | 2015 AFC Champions League |
| 21 April 2015 | Group stage | 1–2 | (Saudi Arabia) Al-Hilal | Tashkent, Uzbekistan | 2015 AFC Champions League |
| 5 May 2015 | Group stage | 0–1 | (Iran) Foolad | Ahvaz, Iran | 2015 AFC Champions League |
| 23 February 2016 | Group stage | 1–1 | (Saudi Arabia) Al-Ittihad | Tashkent, Uzbekistan | 2016 AFC Champions League |
| 1 March 2016 | Group stage | 1–1 | (Saudi Arabia) Al-Ittihad | Jeddah, Saudi Arabia | 2016 AFC Champions League |
| 15 March 2016 | Group stage | 2–0 | (Iran) Sepahan | Isfahan, Iran | 2016 AFC Champions League |
| 6 April 2016 | Group stage | 1–0 | (Iran) Sepahan | Tashkent, Uzbekistan | 2016 AFC Champions League |
| 20 April 2016 | Group stage | 1–1 | (United Arab Emirates) Al-Nasr | Dubai, United Arab Emirates | 2016 AFC Champions League |
| 4 May 2016 | Group stage | 0–0 | (United Arab Emirates) Al-Nasr | Tashkent, Uzbekistan | 2016 AFC Champions League |
| 17 May 2016 | Round of 16 | 0–0 | (Saudi Arabia) Al-Hilal | Riyadh, Saudi Arabia | 2016 AFC Champions League |
| 24 May 2016 | Round of 16 | 2–1 | (Saudi Arabia) Al-Hilal | Tashkent, Uzbekistan | 2016 AFC Champions League |
| 23 August 2016 | Quarter-finals | 0–0 | (United Arab Emirates) Al-Ain | Al Ain, United Arab Emirates | 2016 AFC Champions League |
| 13 September 2016 | Quarter-finals | 0–1 | (United Arab Emirates) Al-Ain | Tashkent, Uzbekistan | 2016 AFC Champions League |
| 20 February 2017 | Group stage | 0–1 | (Saudi Arabia) Al-Taawoun | Buraidah, Saudi Arabia | 2017 AFC Champions League |
| 27 February 2017 | Group stage | 2–0 | (United Arab Emirates) Al-Ahli | Tashkent, Uzbekistan | 2017 AFC Champions League |
| 13 March 2017 | Group stage | 0–2 | (Iran) Esteghlal | Tehran, Iran | 2017 AFC Champions League |
| 11 April 2017 | Group stage | 1–1 | (Iran) Esteghlal | Tashkent, Uzbekistan | 2017 AFC Champions League |
| 25 April 2017 | Group stage | 4–4 | (Saudi Arabia) Al-Taawoun | Tashkent, Uzbekistan | 2017 AFC Champions League |
| 9 May 2017 | Group stage | 0–4 | (United Arab Emirates) Al-Ahli | Dubai, United Arab Emirates | 2017 AFC Champions League |
| 12 February 2018 | Group stage | 5–0 | (United Arab Emirates) Al-Wahda | Tashkent, Uzbekistan | 2018 AFC Champions League |
| 19 February 2018 | Group stage | 0–2 | (Iran) Zob Ahan | Isfahan, Iran | 2018 AFC Champions League |
| 6 March 2018 | Group stage | 2–3 | (Qatar) Al-Duhail | Doha, Qatar | 2018 AFC Champions League |
| 12 March 2018 | Group stage | 1–2 | (Qatar) Al-Duhail | Tashkent, Uzbekistan | 2018 AFC Champions League |
| 3 April 2018 | Group stage | 4–1 | (United Arab Emirates) Al-Wahda | Abu Dhabi, United Arab Emirates | 2018 AFC Champions League |
| 17 April 2018 | Group stage | 1–1 | (Iran) Zob Ahan | Tashkent, Uzbekistan | 2018 AFC Champions League |
| 4 March 2019 | Group stage | 2–0 | (United Arab Emirates) Al-Wahda | Tashkent, Uzbekistan | 2019 AFC Champions League |
| 11 March 2019 | Group stage | 1–2 | (Qatar) Al-Rayyan | Doha, Qatar | 2019 AFC Champions League |
| 9 April 2019 | Group stage | 2–3 | (Saudi Arabia) Al-Ittihad | Jeddah, Saudi Arabia | 2019 AFC Champions League |
| 22 April 2019 | Group stage | 1–1 | (Saudi Arabia) Al-Ittihad | Tashkent, Uzbekistan | 2019 AFC Champions League |
| 7 May 2019 | Group stage | 1–3 | (United Arab Emirates) Al-Wahda | Abu Dhabi, United Arab Emirates | 2019 AFC Champions League |
| 21 May 2019 | Group stage | 3–2 | (Qatar) Al-Rayyan | Tashkent, Uzbekistan | 2019 AFC Champions League |
| 21 January 2020 | Preliminary round 2 | 0–1 | (Tajikistan) Istiklol | Tashkent, Uzbekistan | 2020 AFC Champions League |

== Stadium ==
The club played its home matches at TTYMI Stadium, a stadium of Tashkent Institute of Railway Transport Engineers. In 2009 Lokomotiv started with construction of a new 8,000-all-seater arena, Lokomotiv Stadium at the place of Traktor Tashkent Stadium and renovation works were finished in Spring 2012. The sport complex includes sporting facilities, a hotel and car parking for 270 vehicles. The new stadium was opened on 11 May 2012 with an official 2012 Uzbek League match between Lokomotiv and FK Andijan. Currently Lokomotiv plays its home matches both at Lokomotiv Stadium and TTYMI Stadium. As of 2017 all home games are played only at TTZ stadium.

== Kit manufacturers and shirt sponsors ==
The shirt sponsor of Lokomotiv is the national rail carrier O'zbekiston Temir Yo'llari. Lokomotiv's shirts had been made by manufacturer Adidas until 2013. In February 2013, it was announced the club had signed a contract with Joma as the club's new kit manufacturer. In 2024 "Lokomotiv" PFK signed a contract with the 7SABER brand.

| Period | Kit manufacturer | Shirt partner |
|---|---|---|
| 2002–2012 | Adidas | Uzbekistan Railways |
| 2013–2017 | Joma | Uzbekistan Railways |
| 2018–2019 | Joma | OrientFinansBank |
| 2020– | Joma | Uztelecom |
| 2022– | Adidas | BMB Group Drivers Village |
| 2024– | 7Saber | BMB Group JIP Invest |

== Players ==
=== Current squad ===
As of 29 July, 2026

Note: Flags indicate national team as defined under FIFA eligibility rules; some limited exceptions apply. Players may hold more than one non-FIFA nationality.

| No. | Pos. | Nation | Player |
|---|---|---|---|
| 1 | GK | RUS | Aleksei Kozlov |
| 5 | DF | UZB | Anzur Ismailov |
| 7 | FW | UZB | Quvonchbek Abrayev |
| 8 | MF | UZB | Bilol Tupliyev |
| 9 | MF | UZB | Sukhrob Nurullaev |
| 10 | FW | UZB | Shodiyor Shodiboyev |
| 11 | FW | UZB | Temurkhuja Abdukholiqov |
| 12 | GK | RUS | Nikita Shevchenko |
| 14 | MF | BLR | Mikalay Ivanow |
| 15 | DF | AUS | Aleksandar Susnjar |
| 16 | GK | UZB | Danil Baklanov |
| 17 | MF | UZB | Sardor Mirzaev |

| No. | Pos. | Nation | Player |
|---|---|---|---|
| 18 | MF | UKR | Oleksandr Kucherenko |
| 19 | DF | UZB | Sherzodbek Abdulboriev |
| 22 | DF | UZB | Sunnatilla Poyonov |
| 23 | MF | UZB | Diyorjon Turapov |
| 26 | DF | UZB | Abdullokh Yuldoshev |
| 27 | DF | UZB | Ozodbek Oktamov |
| 28 | DF | UZB | Shukhrat Mukhammadiev |
| 33 | DF | UZB | Oleg Zoteyev |
| 45 | MF | SRB | Jovan Nišić |
| 61 | MF | UZB | Nurlan Ibraimov (on loan from Pakhtakor) |
| 70 | MF | UZB | Mukhammedali Reimov |
| 99 | FW | UZB | Jasurbek Yakhshiboev |

== Current technical staff ==
As of January 2021

| Position | Name |
|---|---|
| Manager | |
| Assistant coach | |
| Goalkeeping coach | |
| Club doctor | |

== Management ==
| President | Mansur Radjapov |
| Team Manager | Tulabek Akramov |
| Sporting Director | Ravshan Muqimov |
| PR Manager | Mamurjon Mamadaliev |
| Media officer | Xayrulla Xoliqov |
| Photographer | Mirjalol Normatov |

== Honours ==
- Uzbekistan Super League
  - Champions: 2016, 2017, 2018
- Uzbekistan Pro League
  - Winners: 2011, 2023, 2025
- Uzbekistan Cup
  - Winners: 2014, 2016, 2017
- Uzbekistan Super Cup
  - Winners: 2015, 2019

== Managerial history ==
| Name | Period |
|---|---|
| (Uzbekistan) Anvar Jabbarov | 2002 |
| (Uzbekistan) Tura Shaymardanov | 2003 |
| (Uzbekistan) Andrey Miklyaev | 2004 |
| (Uzbekistan) Rustam Mirsodiqov | 2005 |
| (Uzbekistan) Tura Shaymardanov | 2005 |
| (Uzbekistan) Ravshan Muqimov | 2006 |
| (Uzbekistan) Vyacheslav Solokho | 2007 |
| (Uzbekistan) Ravshan Bozorov | 2007 |
| (Uzbekistan) Ravshan Muqimov | 2007 |
| (Uzbekistan) Sergey Kovshov | 2008 |
| (Uzbekistan) Ravshan Muqimov | 2008 |
| (Uzbekistan) Vadim Abramov | 2009 – 2010 |
| (Uzbekistan) Marat Miftahuddinov | 2010 |
| (Uzbekistan) Andrei Miklyaev | 2010 |

| Name | Period |
|---|---|
| (Turkmenistan) Tachmurad Agamuradov | 2010 |
| (Uzbekistan) Ravshan Muqimov | 2011 |
| (Armenia) Khoren Hovhannisyan | Jan 2012 – June 2012 |
| (Uzbekistan) Ravshan Muqimov | June 2012 – 2012 |
| (Tajikistan) Khakim Fuzaylov | March 2013 – February 2014 |
| (Uzbekistan) Vadim Abramov | February 2014 – 17 October 2015 |
| (Australia) Mirko Jeličić | 17 October 2015 – 18 April 2018 |
| (Russia) Andrey Fyodorov | 19 April 2018 – May 2019 |
| (Uzbekistan) Samvel Babayan | May 2019 – December 2019 |
| (Russia) Andrey Fyodorov | December 2020 – September 2020 |
| (Uzbekistan) Timur Kapadze | September 2020 – November 2020 |
| (Portugal) Micael Sequeira | 7 January 2021 – 21 November 2021 |
| (Uzbekistan) Denis Korostichenko | 15 December 2022 – 24 August 2022 |
| (Uzbekistan) Server Djeparov | 24 August 2022 – 12 December 2022 |

== Notable players ==
Had international caps for their respective countries. Players whose name is listed in bold represented their countries while playing for Lokomotiv.

Uzbekistan

- (Uzbekistan) **Ignatiy Nesterov**
- (Uzbekistan) Oleg Zoteev
- (Uzbekistan) Timur Kapadze
- (Uzbekistan) Alexander Geynrikh
- (Uzbekistan) Server Djeparov
- (Uzbekistan) Anzur Ismailov
- (Uzbekistan) Sardor Rashidov
- (Uzbekistan) Ivan Nagaev
- (Uzbekistan) Sardor Mirzaev
- (Uzbekistan) Jaloliddin Masharipov
- (Uzbekistan) Jamshid Iskanderov
- (Uzbekistan) Jovlon Ibrokhimov
- (Uzbekistan) Husniddin Gafurov
- (Uzbekistan) Ikromjon Alibaev
- (Uzbekistan) Marat Bikmaev
- (Uzbekistan) Vadim Afonin
- (Uzbekistan) Sadriddin Abdullaev
- (Uzbekistan) Islom Tukhtakhujaev
- (Uzbekistan) Jasur Hasanov
- (Uzbekistan) Azizbek Haydarov
- (Uzbekistan) Victor Karpenko

Europe

- (Armenia) Ruslan Koryan
- (Armenia) Zhora Hovhannisyan
- (Armenia) Romik Khachatryan
- (Armenia) Aram Voskanyan
- (Bosnia and Herzegovina) Nemanja Janičić
- (France) Mohammad Bindi Mustaffa
- (Georgia (country)) Kakhi Makharadze
- (Hungary) Péter Vörös
- (Lithuania) Arturas Fomenka
- (North Macedonia) Bojan Najdenov
- (Moldova) Andrei Cojocari
- (Moldova) Alexandru Onica
- (Montenegro) Slaven Stjepanović
- (Montenegro) Damir Kojašević
- (Montenegro) Slavko Damjanović
- (Russia) Aleksandr Filimonov
- (Russia) Alan Kusov
- (Russia) Nikolay Pogrebnyak
- (Russia) Kirill Pogrebnyak
- (Russia) Evgeny Gogol
- (Serbia) Igor Jelić
- (Serbia) Nenad Petrović
- (Serbia) Jovan Đokić
- (Serbia) Filip Rajevac
- (Ukraine) Ivan Kucherenko
- (Ukraine) Vyacheslav Shevchenko
- (Ukraine) Serhiy Litovchenko

South and North America

- (Brazil) Everton Cavalkante
- (Brazil) Nivaldo Rodrigues
- (Brazil) Wilson Teixeira
- (Nicaragua) Ariagner Smith

Africa

- (Burkina Faso) Mohamed Kone
- (Ivory Coast) Gnohere Krizo
- (Nigeria) Benito
- (Nigeria) Okafor Obinna

Asia

- (South Korea) Cho Suk-jae
- (Tajikistan) **Manuchekhr Safarov**
- (Tajikistan) **Rustam Soirov**
- (Turkmenistan) Ýewgeniý Zemskow
- (Turkmenistan) Arslanmyrat Amanow
- (Turkmenistan) Artur Geworkyan
- (Turkmenistan) Maksim Kazankov
