= Lokomotiv Stadium (Tashkent) =

Sports stadium in Uzbekistan

- Interactive map of Lokomotiv Stadium
- Location: Tashkent, Uzbekistan
- Coordinates: 41°21′40″N 69°23′42″E
- Owner: Lokomotiv Tashkent
- Operator: Lokomotiv Tashkent
- Capacity: 8,000

Construction
- Opened: 11 May 2012; 14 years ago
- Cost: $18.1 million

Tenant
- Lokomotiv Tashkent

Lokomotiv Stadium, is a multi-use stadium in Tashkent, Uzbekistan. It is currently used mostly for football matches and is the home of football club, Lokomotiv Tashkent.

The stadium was built on the site of the Traktor Tashkent Stadium. The construction work started in 2009 and finished in 2012. The stadium holds 8,000 people.

The stadium was opened on 11 May 2012 with the 2012 Uzbek League match between Lokomotiv and FK Andijan.

== Former stadium ==
The Traktor Tashkent Stadium was built in 1970 and used mostly for football matches. The stadium held 6,400 people. It was the home stadium for capital club Traktor Tashkent. After the club was dissolved in 2007, Lokomotiv Tashkent played their home matches here. In July 2009 it was announced that the stadium would be closed for reconstruction to build Lokomotiv Stadium. In spring of 2012 the reconstruction at the stadium was finished.
