= Sogdiana Stadium =

Stadium in Jizzakh, Uzbekistan

Coordinates: 40°6′50.5″N 67°49′44.3″E

Sogdiana Sporting Complex
- Interactive map of Sogdiana Sporting Complex
- Full name: So'g'diyona stadioni
- Location: Jizzakh, Uzbekistan
- Capacity: 11,650 (football)
- Surface: grass

Construction
- Built: 1970
- Opened: 1970
- Renovated: 2015
- Expanded: 11,650

Tenant
- Sogdiyona Jizzakh

Sogdiyona Sport Complex (Uzbek: So'g'diyona Sport Majmuasi) or Sogdiyona Stadium, is a sport complex in Jizzakh, Uzbekistan. It is used mostly for football matches and is the home stadium of FC Sogdiana Jizzakh. The stadium holds 11,650 spectators.

== History ==
The stadium wit initial name Markaziy Stadium Jizzakh, in English: Central Stadium Jizzakh, was built in 1970. The stadium original capacity was 9,000 spectators. Over 40 years stadium became outdated. The first big renovation was held in 1997.

== Reconstruction ==
In 2012 stadium was closed and underwent massive reconstruction. The construction works were finished and stadium holds 11,650 spectators. The stadium's name have been changed to Sogdiyona Sport Majmuasi. On 26 June 2015 Sogdiana Stadium was officially opened with first official League match Sogdiana vs Kokand 1912.
