= FC AGMK =

OKMK Uzbek: OKMK
- Full name: Football Club OKMK; OKMK Futbol Klubi
- Nicknames: Miners; Metallurgists
- Founded: 2004; 22 years ago
- Ground: AGMK Stadium
- Capacity: 12,000
- Owner: AGMK
- Chairman: Alexandr Farmanov
- Manager: Mirjalol Qosimov
- League: Uzbekistan Super League
- 2025: Uzbekistan Super League, 6th of 16
- Website: www.fc-olmaliq.uz
Home colours	Away colours	Third colours

Former club crest (2009–2017)

FC OKMK (Uzbek: OKMK Olmaliq futbol klubi / ОКМК Олмалиқ футбол клуби; Russian: Футбольный клуб АГМК) is a professional football club based in Olmaliq, Tashkent Region, Uzbekistan, that competes in the Uzbekistan Super League. Their futsal club participated in the AFC Futsal Club Championship.

== History ==
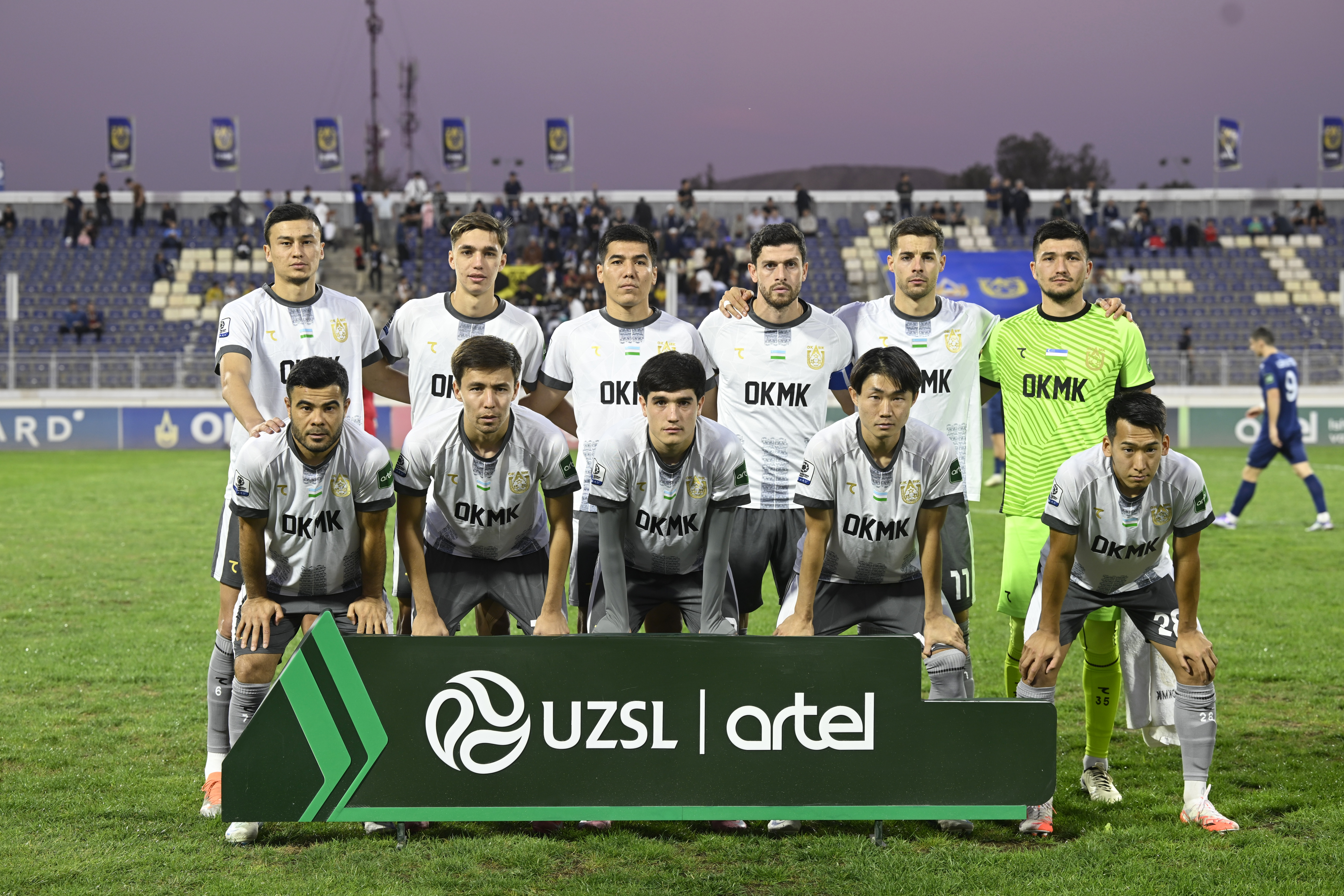
FC AGMK in 2025 Uzbekistan Super League season

Football club AGMK founded in 2004. The general sponsor and the team owner – JSC "Almalyk mining and metallurgical plant". The official name the football club AGMK is the abbreviation which comes from the name of the company in Russian (Russian: Алмалыкский горно-металлургический комбинат / Almalykskiy gorno-mettalurgichesky kombinat). "Almalyk mining and metallurgical plant" as successor to the disbanded football club "Metallurg Almalyk" who participated in 1966–1988 years in the Second League of the USSR championship. In the early years of founding, the club was called the AGMK.

In 2004, the AGMK plant has applied to participate in the Uzbekistan First League (today called Uzbekistan Pro League) and soon the offer was accepted. In his debut season, AGMK finished sixth. In the season 2005–2006, the club finished in tenth place. At the end of the 2007 season, AGMK finished in seventh place in the Uzbekistan First League but were allowed to participate in the Uzbekistan High League (today called Uzbekistan Super League) because two clubs who were supposed to participate in the High League refused to participate for financial reasons.

In their debut season in the High League, the club finished in tenth place out of sixteen teams and reached the semi-finals of the Uzbekistan Cup. In that season, the top scorer of the club became the Lithuanian Arturas Fomenka and scored six goals. In 2009, the club changed its name to FK Olmaliq. The chief coach of the club was appointed a prominent Uzbek football player and aspiring coach Igor Shkvyrin. In that season, FK Olmaliq set their best performance in their history of appearances in the High League – fourth place.

In the season 2010 and 2011, the FK Olmaliq took eleventh place in the High League. In 2012, the club finished in eighth place, and the following season in fifth place. In the season of 2014, FK Olmaliq took the sixth place in the championship. In 2015, he repeated his success of 2014 and was again the sixth. In the 2016 season unexpectedly at the end of the season took 13-th place, and by the end of the 2017 season became the seventh team in the High League.

In early January 2018, the club announced a return to the old and original name AGMK Olmaliq, under which he performed from 2004 to 2008, before renaming in FK Olmaliq in 2009.

=== Club names ===
2004-2008	AGMK Olmaliq
2009-2017	FK Olmaliq
2018-	AGMK Olmaliq

== Domestic history ==
Season	League									Uzbek Cup	Top goalscorer		Manager
Season	Div.	Pos.	Pl.	W	D	L	GS	GA	P	Uzbek Cup	Name	League	Manager
2004	2nd	6th	40	18	5	17	73	75	59	Playoff Round			(Uzbekistan) Rafael Fabarisov
2005	2nd	10th	34	13	10	11	43	50	49	Group Stage			(Uzbekistan) Rafael Fabarisov
2006	2nd	6th	38	20	9	9	58	35	69	Playoff Round			(Uzbekistan) Rafael Fabarisov
2007	2nd	14th	38	13	9	16	57	49	48	Round of 32			(Uzbekistan) Rafael Fabarisov
2008	1st	10th	30	8	9	13	29	34	33	Semifinal	(Lithuania) Artūras Fomenka	6	(Uzbekistan) Igor Shkvyrin
2009	1st	4th	30	15	3	12	50	38	48	Round of 16	(Uzbekistan) Muiddin Mamazulunov	12	(Uzbekistan) Igor Shkvyrin
2010	1st	11th	26	8	5	13	32	41	29	Round of 16	(Uzbekistan) Nosirbek Otakuziev	13	(Uzbekistan) Igor Shkvyrin
2011	1st	11th	26	8	5	13	37	45	29	Round of 32	(Uzbekistan) Muiddin Mamazulunov	16	(Uzbekistan) Igor Shkvyrin
2012	1st	8th	26	9	4	13	39	46	31	Round of 16	(Uzbekistan) Zafar Polvonov	7	(Uzbekistan) Igor Shkvyrin
2013	1st	5th	26	11	7	8	46	43	40	Round of 16	(Uzbekistan) Zafar Polvonov	14	(Uzbekistan) Igor Shkvyrin
2014	1st	6th	26	8	7	11	33	38	31	Quarterfinal	(Uzbekistan) Diyorjon Turapov (Tunisia) Chaker Zouaghi	4	(Uzbekistan) Igor Shkvyrin
2015	1st	6th	26	12	8	10	53	49	44	Round of 32	(Serbia) Nemanja Jovanović	9	(Uzbekistan) Igor Shkvyrin
2016	1st	13th	30	8	2	20	40	54	26	Round of 16	(Uzbekistan) Muiddin Mamazulunov	6	(Uzbekistan) Igor Shkvyrin (Russia) Viktor Kumykov
2017	1st	8th	30	12	8	10	31	32	44	Round of 16	(Belarus) Uladzislaw Kasmynin	6	(Russia) Viktor Kumykov
2018	1st	10th	20	7	6	7	25	23	27	Winner	(Serbia) Jovan Đokić	11	(Russia) Viktor Kumykov (Uzbekistan) Bakhtiyor Ashurmatov
2019	1st	9th	26	9	5	12	36	37	32	Runners Up	(Uzbekistan) Zafar Polvonov	15	(Uzbekistan) Mirjalol Qosimov
2020	1st	3rd	26	14	7	5	39	28	49	Runners Up	(Georgia (country)) Elgujja Grigalashvili	7	(Uzbekistan) Mirjalol Qosimov
2021	1st	3rd	26	13	8	5	34	25	47	Semifinal	(Ukraine) Oleksandr Kasyan	6	(Uzbekistan) Mirjalol Qosimov
2022	1st	4th	26	13	5	8	44	23	44	Semifinal	(Italy) Martin Boakye	12	(Uzbekistan) Mirjalol Qosimov

=== Continental record ===
As of match played 18 September 2023

Competition	Pld	W	D	L	GF	GA
AFC Champions League	12	6	1	5	16	22
Total	12	6	1	5	16	22

Season	Competition	Round	Club	Home	Away	Aggregate
2019	AFC Champions League	Preliminary round 2	(Tajikistan) Istiklol	4–2		
2019	AFC Champions League	Play-off round	(Saudi Arabia) Al-Nassr	0–4		
2021	AFC Champions League	Play-off round	(Qatar) Al Gharafa	1–0		
2021	AFC Champions League	Group A	(Saudi Arabia) Al Hilal	0–3	2–2	4th
2021	AFC Champions League	Group A	(United Arab Emirates) Shabab al-Ahli	2–1	1–3	4th
2021	AFC Champions League	Group A	(Tajikistan) Istiklol	2–3	2–1	4th
2023–24	AFC Champions League	Preliminary stage	(Oman) Al-Seeb	1–0		
2023–24	AFC Champions League	Play-off stage	(Qatar) Al-Arabi	1–0		
2023–24	AFC Champions League	Group C	(Saudi Arabia) Al-Ittihad		0–3	
2023–24	AFC Champions League	Group C	(Iran) Sepahan			
2023–24	AFC Champions League	Group C	(Iraq) Al-Quwa Al-Jawiya			

== Stadium ==
FK Olmaliq played plays its matches at the OKMK Sport Majmuasi. Old Olmaliq stadion was built in 1960 and holds 11,000 spectators and had name Metallurg Stadium. In 2011 club started with building of new modern 12.000-all-seater stadium, New Olmaliq Stadium located not far from Metallurg Stadium (Olmaliq). The new Olmaliq sporting complex also includes indoor courts for volleyball, handball, basketball, kurash and outdoor and indoor tennis courts. The construction works were finished in February 2014. The old stadium remains and will be renovated. The whole sporting complex with New Olmaliq Stadium was officially named OKMK Sport Majmuasi.

The opening ceremony of the stadium was held on 16 March 2014 with the first official of 2014 Uzbek League match FK Olmaliq - Metallurg Bekabad ended with 3:2 win of FK Olmaliq.

On 27 May 2014 OKMK Sport Majmuasi hosted the first international match, friendly match Uzbekistan – Oman ended with score 0–1.

== Players ==
=== Current squad ===
As of 28 July, 2026

Note: Flags indicate national team as defined under FIFA eligibility rules; some limited exceptions apply. Players may hold more than one non-FIFA nationality.

No.	Pos.	Nation	Player
3	DF	UZB	Shakhzod Toirov
4	MF	UZB	Mirjamol Qosimov
5	MF	GEO	Giorgi Papava
6	DF	UZB	Avazbek Ulmasaliev
7	DF	UZB	Dilshod Ahmadaliev
8	MF	UZB	Abubakrrizo Turdialiev
9	FW	UZB	Aziz Kholmurodov
10	FW	UZB	Asad Sobirzhonov
11	FW	UZB	Ali Abdurakhmonov
13	DF	UZB	Eldorbek Begimov
14	MF	UZB	Akbar Uktamov
16	MF	JPN	Naoaki Senaga
17	MF	UZB	Nodir Abdurazzoqov

No.	Pos.	Nation	Player
18	MF	UZB	Rian Islamov
19	DF	UZB	Ahmadullo Muqimjonov
21	MF	UZB	Hazrat Tursunqulov
22	DF	UZB	Saidafzalkhon Akhrorov
23	GK	UZB	Khamidullo Abdunabiev
27	FW	SRB	Uros Kojic
28	MF	JPN	Arihiro Sentoku
30	MF	UZB	Abror Sarimsoqov
35	GK	UZB	Javohir Ilyosov
44	DF	UZB	Abror Karimov
77	FW	CRO	Ivan Pešić
88	MF	IRI	Siavash Haghnazari
99	GK	UZB	Umid Irgashev

=== Out on loan ===
Note: Flags indicate national team as defined under FIFA eligibility rules; some limited exceptions apply. Players may hold more than one non-FIFA nationality.

No. / Pos. / Nation / Player	No. / Pos. / Nation / Player

== Honours ==
=== Domestic ===
- Uzbekistan Cup:

Winners (1): 2018
Runners-up (3): 2019, 2020, 2023

- Uzbekistan League Cup:

Winners (1): 2013
Runners-up (1): 2012

== Managers ==
Period	Head coach
2004—2007	(Uzbekistan) Rafael Fabarisov
2008—2016	(Uzbekistan) Igor Shkvyrin
2016—2018	(Russia) Viktor Kumykov
2018—2018	(Uzbekistan) Bakhtiyor Ashurmatov
2019—	(Uzbekistan) Mirjalol Qosimov
