= 2016 FC Bunyodkor season =

FC Bunyodkor
2016 season
- Chairman: Bedil Alimov
- Manager: Sergey Lushan
- Uzbek League: 3rd
- Uzbekistan Cup: Semifinal vs Lokomotiv Tashkent
- AFC Champions League: Group Stage
- Top goalscorer: League: Eldor Shomurodov (10); All: Two Players (12)
Home colours	Away colours

The 2016 season is Bunyodkors 10th season in the Uzbek League in Uzbekistan.

== Squad ==
As of 9 August 2016

Note: Flags indicate national team as defined under FIFA eligibility rules; some limited exceptions apply. Players may hold more than one non-FIFA nationality.

No.	Pos.	Nation	Player
1	GK	UZB	Pavel Bugalo
2	DF	UZB	Akmal Shorakhmedov
3	DF	UZB	Akram Komilov
4	DF	UZB	Hayrulla Karimov
8	MF	UZB	Jovlon Ibrokhimov
9	MF	JPN	Minori Sato
10	FW	UZB	Eldor Shomurodov
11	FW	UZB	Shahzodbek Nurmatov
14	FW	UZB	Bahodir Nasimov
15	DF	UZB	Javlon Mirabdullaev
16	MF	UZB	Dilshodbek Axmadaliev
17	MF	UZB	Dostonbek Khamdamov
19	FW	UZB	Zabikhillo Urinboev

No.	Pos.	Nation	Player
21	MF	UZB	Sardorbek Azimov
22	DF	UZB	Rustam Ashurmatov
23	MF	UZB	Shohrux Gadoyev
25	GK	UZB	Murod Zukhurov
26	MF	UZB	Sanjar Kodirkulov
29	MF	UZB	Otabek Shukurov
30	DF	CRO	Jurica Buljat
35	GK	UZB	Abdukarim Mukhammedov
44	MF	UZB	Mirjamol Kosimov
45	GK	UZB	Akbar Turaev
71	MF	SRB	Aleksandar Alempijević
77	MF	UZB	Viktor Karpenko

=== Technical staff ===
Position	Name
Head coach	(Uzbekistan) Bedil Alimov
Assistant coach	(Uzbekistan) Yuriy Sarkisyan
Assistant coach	(Ukraine) Amet Memet
Assistant coach	(Uzbekistan) Mukhiddin Ortikov
Fitness coach	(Romania) Augustin Chiriță
Goalkeeping coach	(Uzbekistan) Abdusattor Rakhimov
Club doctor	(Uzbekistan) Qakhramon Nurmukhammedov

== Transfers ==
=== Winter ===
In: Note: Flags indicate national team as defined under FIFA eligibility rules; some limited exceptions apply. Players may hold more than one non-FIFA nationality.

No.	Pos.	Nation	Player
11	FW	UZB	Shahzodbek Nurmatov (from (Uzbekistan) Metallurg Bekabad)
14	FW	UZB	Bahodir Nasimov (from (Iran) Padideh)
15	DF	UZB	Javlon Mirabdullaev (from (Uzbekistan) Metallurg Bekabad)
29	MF	UZB	Otabek Shukurov (from (Uzbekistan) Buxoro)
30	DF	CRO	Jurica Buljat (from (Ukraine) Metalist Kharkiv)
71	MF	SRB	Aleksandar Alempijević (from (Serbia) Mladost Lučani)

Out: Note: Flags indicate national team as defined under FIFA eligibility rules; some limited exceptions apply. Players may hold more than one non-FIFA nationality.

No.	Pos.	Nation	Player
5	DF	UZB	Dilshod Juraev (to (Uzbekistan) Olmaliq)
6	DF	UZB	Anvar Gafurov (to (Uzbekistan) Obod Tashkent)
13	DF	SRB	Ivan Milošević
14	FW	UZB	Vokhid Shodiev (to (Malaysia) Perak)
20	MF	BIH	Samir Bekrić (to (Bosnia and Herzegovina) Željezničar Sarajevo)
24	MF	UZB	Nuriddin Khasanov
27	MF	UZB	Sardor Sabirkhodjaev (to (Uzbekistan) Sogdiana Jizzakh)
42	MF	UZB	Khursid Giyosov (loan to (Uzbekistan) Obod Tashkent)
88	FW	UZB	Anvar Rajabov (to (Uzbekistan) Navbahor Namangan)

=== Summer ===
In: Note: Flags indicate national team as defined under FIFA eligibility rules; some limited exceptions apply. Players may hold more than one non-FIFA nationality.

No.	Pos.	Nation	Player
23	MF	UZB	Shohrux Gadoyev (from (Bahrain) Al-Muharraq)

Out: Note: Flags indicate national team as defined under FIFA eligibility rules; some limited exceptions apply. Players may hold more than one non-FIFA nationality.

No.	Pos.	Nation	Player
7	MF	TUN	Chaker Zouagi (to (United Arab Emirates) Al Khaleej)

== Competitions ==
=== Uzbek League ===
==== League table ====
Pos	Team	Pld	W	D	L	GF	GA	GD	Pts	Qualification or relegation
1	Lokomotiv (C)	30	23	5	2	77	24	+53	74	2017 AFC Champions League group stage
2	Bunyodkor	30	19	6	5	60	24	+36	63	2017 AFC Champions League 2nd qualifying round
3	Nasaf	30	18	9	3	46	13	+33	63	2017 AFC Champions League 2nd qualifying round
4	Bukhara	30	17	7	6	42	27	+15	58	
5	Pakhtakor	30	15	7	8	49	30	+19	52	

Updated to match(es) played on 23 November 2016. Source: Uzbekistan Professional Football League
Rules for classification: 1) points; 2) goal difference; 3) number of goals scored.
(C) Champions

==== Results summary ====
Overall								Home						Away					
Pld	W	D	L	GF	GA	GD	Pts	W	D	L	GF	GA	GD	W	D	L	GF	GA	GD
30	18	9	3	46	13	+33	63	12	2	1	28	5	+23	6	7	2	18	8	+10

Last updated: 29 November 2016.
Source: See Results

==== Results by round ====
Round	1	2	3	4	5	6	7	8	9	10	11	12	13	14	15	16	17	18	19	20	21	22	23	24	25	26	27	28	29	30
Ground	H	A	H	A	H	A	H	A	H	A	H	A	H	A	A	A	H	A	H	H	A	H	A	H	A	A	H	A	H	H
Result	W	W	D	W	W	W	W	W	W	D	W	D	W	W	D	L	W	D	W	W	L	W	D	W	W	D	W	D	D	L
Position	1	5	6	5	2	2	2	2	2	2	2	2	2	1	2	2	2	2	2	2	2	2	2	2	2	2	2	2	2	2

Source: See Results
A = Away; H = Home; W = Win; D = Draw; L = Loss

==== Results ====
5 March 2016 1	Bunyodkor	2 – 0	Neftchi Farg'ona	Tashkent
18:00 UZT (UTC+5)	Nasimov 9'; Ashurmatov (yellow card) 54'; Shomurodov 70'; Alempijević (yellow card) 83'	Summary	A.Samatov (yellow card) 8'	Stadium: Bunyodkor Stadium; Attendance: 1,428; Referee: Sherwood Kasymov

11 March 2016 2	Sogdiana Jizzakh	0 – 1	Bunyodkor	Jizzakh
17:00 UZT (UTC+5)	J.Jiamurodov (yellow card) 72'	Summary	Ibrokhimov (yellow card) 7'; Nasimov 24'; Khamdamov (yellow card) 85'; Zouagi (yellow card) 86'; Shomurodov (yellow card) 89'	Stadium: Sogdiana Stadium; Attendance: 10,684; Referee: Timur Tukhtasinov

31 March 2016 3	Bunyodkor	0 – 0	Mash'al Mubarek	Tashkent
18:00 UZT (UTC+5)	Zukhurov (yellow card) 36'; Buljat (yellow card) 48'; Ashurmatov (yellow card) 52'; Shukurov (yellow card) 71'	Summary	Erkinov (yellow card) 36'; M.Gofurov (yellow card) 40'; D.Khasanov (yellow card) 45+1'; Z.Turaev (yellow card) 88'	Stadium: Bunyodkor Stadium; Attendance: 531; Referee: Viktor Serazetdinov

10 April 2016 4	Shorten Guzar	0 – 1	Bunyodkor	G‘uzor
17:00 UZT (UTC+5)	A.Amonov (yellow card) 53'; J.Otakulov (red card) 89'	Summary	Khamdamov (yellow card) 30'; Sato 54'; Ibrokhimov (yellow card) 75'; Shukurov (yellow card) 81'	Stadium: G'uzor Stadium; Attendance: 6,452; Referee: Olim Tuychibaev

16 April 2016 5	Bunyodkor	4 – 2	Olmaliq	Tashkent
19:00 UZT (UTC+5)	Shomurodov 13'; Nasimov 35', 45+1'; Khamdamov 57'; Shukurov (yellow card) 62'; Buljat (yellow card) 80'; Shorakhmedov (yellow card) 83'	Summary	Tadjiyev 30' (pen.); N.Pavlenko (yellow card) 31'; D.Ismoilov 56' (yellow card) 66'; M.Isayev (yellow card) 60'	Stadium: Bunyodkor Stadium; Attendance: 1,306; Referee: Zokir Kadyrov

23 April 2016 6	Obod Tashkent	0 – 4	Bunyodkor	Tashkent
17:00 UZT (UTC+5)	S.Djalilov (yellow card) 34'; D.Hasanov (yellow card) 62'; S.Turakulov (red card) 77'	Summary	Khamdamov 35' (pen.); Shorakhmedov 40'; Zouagi (yellow card) 41'; Shomurodov 44', 75'; Buljat (yellow card) 85'; Ashurmatov (yellow card) 90+1'	Stadium: Obod Stadium; Attendance: 2,178; Referee: Khasan Ruziev

29 April 2016 7	Bunyodkor	3 – 0	Pakhtakor Tashkent	Tashkent
19:00 UZT (UTC+5)	Khamdamov 56' (pen.); Urinboev 57'; Shomurodov 88'	Summary	J.Boltaboev (yellow card) 55'; A.Orahovac (yellow card) 65'	Stadium: Bunyodkor Stadium; Attendance: 3,784; Referee: Aziz Asymov

9 May 2016 8	Kokand 1912	0 – 2	Bunyodkor	Kokand
17:00 UZT (UTC+5)		Summary	Urinboev (yellow card) 25'; Shomurodov 60'; Nurmatov 73'	Stadium: Kokand Stadium; Attendance: 6,282; Referee: Ravshan Irmatov

14 May 2016 9	Bunyodkor	3 – 0	Buxoro	Tashkent
19:00 UZT (UTC+5)	Sato 51'; Shomurodov 62'; Khamdamov 65'	Summary	Filiposyan (yellow card) 29'; Murzoev (yellow card) 72'	Stadium: Bunyodkor Stadium; Attendance: 1,504; Referee: Sherzod Kasymov

28 May 2016 10	Nasaf Qarshi	1 – 1	Bunyodkor	Qarshi
19:30 UZT (UTC+5)	E.Badullayev 65'	Summary	Buljat (yellow card) 28'; Nurmatov 51'; Shorakhmedov (yellow card) 66'; Khamdamov (yellow card) 72'; Shukurov (red card) 84'	Stadium: Markaziy Stadium; Attendance: 8,621; Referee: Ilgiz Tantashev

10 June 2016 11	Bunyodkor	2 – 0	Qizilqum Zarafshon	Tashkent
19:00 UZT (UTC+5)	Alempijević 77'; Nasimov 80'	Summary	Shevchenko (yellow card) 60'	Stadium: Bunyodkor Stadium; Attendance: 968; Referee: Timur Tukhtasinov

16 June 2016 12	Metallurg Bekabad	1 – 1	Bunyodkor	Bekabad
17:45 UZT (UTC+5)	D.Karimkulov (yellow card) 23'; M.Toshmatov 51'	Summary	Shorakhmedov (yellow card) 23'; Ashurmatov (yellow card) 25'; Buljat (yellow card) 55'; Urinboev 80'	Stadium: Metallurg Bekabad Stadium; Attendance: 4,301; Referee: Viktor Serazetdinov

20 June 2016 13	Bunyodkor	2 – 0	Andijan	Tashkent
19:00 UZT (UTC+5)	Zouagi 8'; Khamdamov 41'	Summary	R.Khasanov (yellow card) 78'	Stadium: Bunyodkor Stadium; Attendance: 869; Referee: Naim Kasymov

25 June 2016 14	Navbahor Namangan	1 – 3	Bunyodkor	Namangan
19:00 UZT (UTC+5)	D.Djabbarov 22'	Summary	Pyschur 4' (o.g.); Nurmatov 24'; Shomurodov 67'	Stadium: Markaziy Stadium; Attendance: 4,382; Referee: Vladislav Tseytlin

1 July 2016 15	Lokomotiv Tashkent	0 – 0	Bunyodkor	Tashkent
19:00 UZT (UTC+5)	I.Alibaev (yellow card) 47'; Kapadze (yellow card) 70'; Makharadze (yellow card) 78'	Summary	Komilov (yellow card) 16'; Shorakhmedov (yellow card) 29'; Alempijević (yellow card) 81'	Stadium: Lokomotiv Stadium; Attendance: 2,112; Referee: Ravshan Irmatov

3 August 2016 16	Neftchi Farg'ona	2 – 1	Bunyodkor	Fergana
19:00 UZT (UTC+5)	S.Khakimov 1'; M.Ubaydullaev (yellow card) 6'; A.Isroilov 42'; U.Yusupov (yellow card) 61'; S.Pulatov (yellow card) 81'	Summary	Urinboev (yellow card) 31'; Khamdamov (yellow card) 34'; Shomurodov 37'	Stadium: Istiqlol Stadium; Attendance: 7,521; Referee: Ilgiz Tantashev

9 August 2016 17	Bunyodkor	1 – 0	Sogdiana Jizzakh	Tashkent
19:00 UZT (UTC+5)	Nurmatov 51'	Summary	M.Muzaffarov (yellow card) 35'; S.Kholmatov (yellow card) 78'	Stadium: Lokomotiv Stadium; Attendance: 515; Referee: Akhrol Riskullaev

14 August 2016 18	Mash'al Mubarek	1 – 1	Bunyodkor	Muborak
19:00 UZT (UTC+5)	Turaev 4'; A.Shodmonov (yellow card) 41'; S.Khamrayev (yellow card) 46'; Kuziboyev (yellow card) 55'; B.Nasirov (yellow card) 65'; M.Gofurov (yellow card) 80'	Summary	Sato (yellow card) 47'; Buljat (yellow card) 55'; Nasimov 76'; S.Azimov (yellow card) 84'	Stadium: Bahrom Vafoev Stadium; Attendance: 3,721; Referee: Zokir Kadyrov

19 August 2016 19	Bunyodkor	2 – 1	Shorten Guzar	Tashkent
19:00 UZT (UTC+5)	Ibrokhimov 7'; Sato (yellow card) 18'; Khamdamov 24'; Buljat (yellow card) 29'	Summary	J.Otakulov (yellow card) 21'; U.Eshmuradov 44'	Stadium: Lokomotiv Stadium; Attendance: 728; Referee: Vadim Agishev

10 September 2016 21	Bunyodkor	3 – 0	Obod Tashkent	Tashkent
18:30 UZT (UTC+5)	Khamdamov 2' (pen.); Ashurmatov (yellow card) 6'; Buljat (yellow card) 36'; Komilov (yellow card) 48'; Sato 55'; Nasimov 77'; Shorakhmedov (yellow card) 88'	Summary	S.Kakhkharov (yellow card) 2'	Stadium: Bunyodkor Stadium; Attendance: 576; Referee: Rustam Bobomuradov

17 September 2016 22	Pakhtakor Tashkent	2 – 1	Bunyodkor	Tashkent
18:30 UZT (UTC+5)	J.Masharipov 27'; Khashimov (yellow card) 58'; D.Sokhibov (yellow card) 71'; Iskanderov 85'	Summary	Nasimov (yellow card) 71'; Ibrokhimov (yellow card) 73'; Nurmatov 75'; Alempijević (yellow card) 75'	Stadium: Pakhtakor Markaziy Stadium; Attendance: 2,3117; Referee: Vadim Agishev

24 September 2016 23	Bunyodkor	3 – 0	Kokand 1912	Tashkent
18:00 UZT (UTC+5)	Ibrokhimov 14'; Gadoyev 41'; Khamdamov 89'	Summary	A.Mamatxojaev (yellow card) 62'	Stadium: Bunyodkor Stadium; Attendance: 543; Referee: Dmitiry Pisligin

28 September 2016 24	Buxoro	0 – 0	Bunyodkor	Bukhara
18:00 UZT (UTC+5)	Melziddinov (yellow card) 54'; Cemîrtan (yellow card) 88'	Summary	Khamdamov (yellow card) 17'; Shorakhmedov (yellow card) 66'; Buljat (yellow card) 68'	Stadium: Buxoro Arena; Attendance: 17,772; Referee: Zokir Kadyrov

15 October 2016 25	Bunyodkor	1 – 0	Nasaf Qarshi	Tashkent
17:00 UZT (UTC+5)	Sato (yellow card) 3'; Shomurodov 19'; Komilov (yellow card) 63'; Nasimov (yellow card) 75'; Khamdamov (yellow card) 85'	Summary	Golban (yellow card) 35'; Ćeran (yellow card) 60'	Stadium: Bunyodkor Stadium; Attendance: 1,232; Referee: Ravshan Irmatov

18 October 2016 20	Olmaliq	0 – 2	Bunyodkor	Olmaliq
16:45 UZT (UTC+5)		Summary	Sato 32', 39'	Stadium: Markaziy Stadioni Olmaliq; Attendance: 318; Referee: Vladislav Tseytlin

22 October 2016 26	Qizilqum Zarafshon	0 – 0	Bunyodkor	Navoiy
18:00 UZT (UTC+5)		Summary		Stadium: Yoshlar Stadium; Attendance: 8,768; Referee: Bakhtiyot Namazov

29 October 2016 27	Bunyodkor	1 – 0	Metallurg Bekabad	Tashkent
17:00 UZT (UTC+5)	Nasimov 8'	Summary		Stadium: Bunyodkor Stadium; Attendance: 541; Referee: Rustam Bobomuradov

3 November 2016 28	Andijon	0 – 0	Bunyodkor	Andijan
15:30 UZT (UTC+5)	J.Guseynov (yellow card) 38'; Ilescu (yellow card) 71'	Summary	Gadoyev (yellow card) 35'; Komilov (yellow card) 85'; Buljat (yellow card) 90+1'	Stadium: Soghlom Avlod Stadium; Attendance: 4,199; Referee: Zokir Kadyrov

17 November 2016 29	Bunyodkor	1 – 1	Navbahor Namangan	Tashkent
16:00 UZT (UTC+5)	D.Axmadaliev (yellow card) 40'; Shorakhmedov (yellow card) 53'; Khamdamov 72' (pen.)	Summary	A.Abdullayev 30'; I.Isakjanov (yellow card) 33'; A.Mamazoitov (red card) 71'; A.Parvanov (yellow card) 90+3'	Stadium: Bunyodkor Stadium; Attendance: 507; Referee: Vladislav Tseytlin

23 November 2016 30	Bunyodkor	0 – 1	Lokomotiv Tashkent	Tashkent
14:00 UZT (UTC+5)	Shorakhmedov (yellow card) 45'	Summary	Mirzaev 74'	Stadium: Bunyodkor Stadium; Attendance: 507; Referee: Sherzod Kasymov

=== Uzbek Cup ===
26 March 2016 Round of 16, 1st leg	Obod Tashkent	2 – 2	Bunyodkor	Tashkent
15:00 UZT (UTC+5)	Shorakhmedov 36' (o.g.); A.Khodjaev (yellow card) 56' (goal) 62'	Summary	Alempijević (yellow card) 24'; Nasimov 32', 60' (yellow card) 79'; Buljat (yellow card) 90+3'	Stadium: Obod Stadium; Attendance: 1,214; Referee: Naim Kasymov

21 May 2016 Round of 16, 2nd leg	Bunyodkor	2 – 1 (4 – 3 agg.)	Obod Tashkent	Tashkent
19:00 UZT (UTC+5)	Nurmatov 11'; Zouagi (yellow card) 22'; Sato 47' (yellow card) 75'	Summary	Solomin (yellow card) 29'; Komilov 42' (o.g.)	Stadium: Bunyodkor Stadium; Attendance: 1,128; Referee: Vladislav Tseytlin

29 July 2016 Quarterfinal, 1st leg	Bunyodkor	3 – 1	Metallurg Bekabad	Tashkent
19:00 UZT (UTC+5)	Khamdamov 13'; Shukurov (yellow card) 28'; Gadoyev 68'; Alempijević (yellow card) 83'; S.Azimov 90'	Summary	J.Esonkulov (yellow card) 45'; J.Abdumuminov (yellow card) 55'; Z.Abdullayev 76' (yellow card) 80'; S.Abdujabborov (yellow card) 90+3'	Stadium: Bunyodkor Stadium; Attendance: 868; Referee: Sherzod Kasymov

21 September 2016 Quarterfinal, 2nd leg	Metallurg Bekabad	0 – 0 (1 – 3 agg.)	Bunyodkor	Bekabad
16:00 UZT (UTC+5)	K.Khoshimov (yellow card) 32'; F.Namazov (yellow card) 89'	Summary	Alempijević (yellow card) 21'; S.Azimov (yellow card) 45'; Buljat (yellow card) 88'	Stadium: Metallurg Bekabad Stadium; Attendance: 2,125; Referee: Olim Talibdjanov

25 October 2016 Semifinal, 1st leg	Lokomotiv Tashkent	1 – 0	Bunyodkor	Tashkent
17:00 UZT (UTC+5)	Makharadze (yellow card) 40'; Djeparov (yellow card) 60'; Mirzaev 83'	Summary	Buljat (yellow card) 30'	Stadium: Lokomotiv Stadium; Attendance: 2,852; Referee: Sherzod Kasymov

26 November 2016 Semifinal, 2nd leg	Bunyodkor	0 – 1 (0 – 2 agg.)	Lokomotiv Tashkent	Tashkent
16:00 UZT (UTC+5)	Ashurmatov (yellow card) 14'; Shukurov (yellow card) 62'; Nasimov (yellow card) 79'	Summary	Bikmaev (yellow card) 22'; Kapadze 75'	Stadium: Bunyodkor Stadium; Attendance: 2,507; Referee: Olim Talibdjanov

=== AFC Champions League ===
==== Play-off round ====
9 February 2015	Bunyodkor (Uzbekistan)	2 – 0	(United Arab Emirates) Al Shabab	Tashkent, Uzbekistan
17:00 UZT (UTC+5)	Shomurodov 2', 35'; Khamdamov (yellow card) 68'	Report	Ali Ayed (yellow card) 25'; H.Safar (yellow card) 60'; Villanueva (yellow card) 90+3'	Stadium: Bunyodkor Stadium; Attendance: 9,485; Referee: Kim Dong-jin (South Korea)

==== Group stage ====
Pos	Team	Pld	W	D	L	GF	GA	GD	Pts	Qualification
1	(Iran) Zob Ahan	6	4	2	0	12	2	+10	14	Advance to knockout stage
2	(Qatar) Lekhwiya	6	2	3	1	7	2	+5	9	Advance to knockout stage
3	(Saudi Arabia) Al-Nassr	6	1	2	3	5	14	−9	5	
4	(Uzbekistan) Bunyodkor	6	0	3	3	5	11	−6	3	

Source: AFC

23 February 2016 1	Al-Nassr (Saudi Arabia)	3 – 3	(Uzbekistan) Bunyodkor	Riyadh, Saudi Arabia
22:15 UZT (UTC+5)	Mierzejewski 45+1'; Al-Shehri 79'; Abdulghani 84'	Report	Khamdamov 3', 75'; Zouagi 33'; Shukurov (yellow card) 39'; Ashurmatov (yellow card) 45'	Stadium: King Fahd International Stadium; Attendance: 11,138; Referee: Ko Hyung-jin (South Korea)

1 March 2016 2	Bunyodkor (Uzbekistan)	0 – 1	(Saudi Arabia) Al-Nassr	Tashkent, Uzbekistan
18:00 UZT (UTC+5)	Shomurodov (yellow card) 27'	Report	Maïga 35'; Hawsawi (yellow card) 54'; Ghaleb (yellow card) 90+3'	Stadium: Bunyodkor Stadium; Attendance: 8,027; Referee: Mohd Amirul Izwan Yaacob (Malaysia)

16 March 2016 3	Bunyodkor (Uzbekistan)	0 – 0	(Iran) Zob Ahan	Tashkent, Uzbekistan
18:00 UZT (UTC+5)	Alempijević (yellow card) 22'	Report		Stadium: Bunyodkor Stadium; Attendance: 4,567; Referee: Peter Green (Australia)

5 April 2016 4	Zob Ahan (Iran)	5 – 2	(Uzbekistan) Bunyodkor	Isfahan, Iran
20:30 UZT (UTC+5)	Esmaeilifar 3'; Mohammadzadeh 34'; Rajabzadeh 50'; Rezaei 69'; Tabrizi 87'	Report	Zouaghi (yellow card) 67' (goal) 78'; Khamdamov (yellow card) 72'; Nurmatov 89'	Stadium: Foolad Shahr Stadium; Attendance: 4,523; Referee: Ma Ning (China)

20 April 2016 5	Bunyodkor (Uzbekistan)	0 – 2	(Qatar) Lekhwiya	Tashkent, Uzbekistan
19:00 UZT (UTC+5)	Nasimov (yellow card) 44'; Ashurmatov (yellow card) 90+4'	Report	Abdullah (yellow card) 28'; Boudiaf 65'; Muntari 79' (yellow card) 79'; Maqsoud (yellow card) 90'	Stadium: Bunyodkor Stadium; Attendance: 3,017; Referee: Hettikamkanamge Perera (Sri Lanka)

4 May 2016 6	Lekhwiya (Qatar)	0 – 0	(Uzbekistan) Bunyodkor	Doha, Qatar
22:15 UZT (UTC+5)	Al Saadi (yellow card) 90+1'	Report	Urinboev (yellow card) 2'; Alempijević (yellow card) 27'	Stadium: Abdullah bin Khalifa Stadium; Attendance: 1,100; Referee: Kim Dong-jin (South Korea)

== Squad statistics ==
As of match played 26 November 2016

=== Appearances and goals ===
No.	Pos	Nat	Player	Total		Uzbek League		Uzbek Cup		Champions League	
No.	Pos	Nat	Player	Apps	Goals	Apps	Goals	Apps	Goals	Apps	Goals
2	DF	(Uzbekistan) UZB	Akmal Shorakhmedov	36	1	25+1	1	4	0	6	0
3	DF	(Uzbekistan) UZB	Akram Komilov	41	0	28+1	0	5	0	7	0
4	DF	(Uzbekistan) UZB	Hayrulla Karimov	1	0	1	0	0	0	0	0
8	MF	(Uzbekistan) UZB	Jovlon Ibrokhimov	26	2	20+1	2	4	0	1	0
9	MF	(Japan) JPN	Minori Sato	39	6	22+5	5	4+2	1	5+1	0
10	FW	(Uzbekistan) UZB	Eldor Shomurodov	39	12	26+1	10	4+1	0	6+1	2
11	FW	(Uzbekistan) UZB	Shahzodbek Nurmatov	39	7	13+14	5	4+2	1	1+5	1
14	FW	(Uzbekistan) UZB	Bahodir Nasimov	35	10	12+14	8	2+1	2	3+3	0
15	DF	(Uzbekistan) UZB	Javlon Mirabdullaev	1	0	0	0	0	0	1	0
16	MF	(Uzbekistan) UZB	Dilshodbek Axmadaliev	19	0	6+7	0	3+1	0	1+1	0
17	MF	(Uzbekistan) UZB	Dostonbek Khamdamov	41	12	28+1	9	5	1	6+1	2
19	FW	(Uzbekistan) UZB	Zabikhillo Urinboev	34	2	10+13	2	2+2	0	3+4	0
21	MF	(Uzbekistan) UZB	Sardorbek Azimov	14	1	2+8	0	1+3	1	0	0
22	DF	(Uzbekistan) UZB	Rustam Ashurmatov	38	0	27	0	4+1	0	6	0
23	MF	(Uzbekistan) UZB	Shohrux Gadoyev	14	2	8+4	1	1+1	1	0	0
25	GK	(Uzbekistan) UZB	Murod Zukhurov	40	0	29	0	4	0	7	0
26	MF	(Uzbekistan) UZB	Sanjar Kodirkulov	4	0	0+1	0	0	0	0+3	0
29	MF	(Uzbekistan) UZB	Otabek Shukurov	38	0	22+3	0	5+1	0	7	0
30	DF	(Croatia) CRO	Jurica Buljat	37	0	25	0	6	0	5+1	0
45	GK	(Uzbekistan) UZB	Akbar Turaev	3	0	1	0	2	0	0	0
71	MF	(Serbia) SRB	Aleksandar Alempijević	30	1	14+6	1	3+1	0	6	0
77	MF	(Uzbekistan) UZB	Viktor Karpenko	4	0	0+1	0	1	0	1+1	0
Players who left Bunyodkor during the season:
6	DF	(Uzbekistan) UZB	Anvar Gafurov	4	0	2	0	1	0	1	0
7	MF	(Tunisia) TUN	Chaker Zouagi	20	3	9+3	1	1+1	0	4+2	2

=== Goal scorers ===
Place	Position	Nation	Number	Name	Uzbek League	Uzbekistan Cup	Champions League	Total
1	FW	(Uzbekistan)	10	Eldor Shomurodov	10	0	2	12
1	MF	(Uzbekistan)	17	Dostonbek Khamdamov	9	1	2	12
3	FW	(Uzbekistan)	14	Bahodir Nasimov	8	2	0	10
4	FW	(Uzbekistan)	11	Shahzodbek Nurmatov	5	1	1	7
5	MF	(Japan)	9	Minori Sato	5	1	0	6
6	MF	(Tunisia)	7	Chaker Zouagi	1	0	2	3
7	FW	(Uzbekistan)	19	Zabikhillo Urinboev	2	0	0	2
7	MF	(Uzbekistan)	8	Jovlon Ibrokhimov	2	0	0	2
7	MF	(Uzbekistan)	23	Shohrux Gadoyev	1	1	0	2
10	DF	(Uzbekistan)	2	Akmal Shorakhmedov	1	0	0	1
10	MF	(Serbia)	71	Aleksandar Alempijević	1	0	0	1
10	MF	(Uzbekistan)	21	Sardorbek Azimov	0	1	0	1
				TOTALS	45	7	7	59

=== Disciplinary record ===
Number	Nation	Position	Name	Uzbek League		Uzbekistan Cup		Champions League		Total	
Number	Nation	Position	Name	Yellow card	Red card	Yellow card	Red card	Yellow card	Red card	Yellow card	Red card
2	(Uzbekistan)	DF	Akmal Shorakhmedov	8	0	0	0	0	0	8	0
3	(Uzbekistan)	DF	Akram Komilov	4	0	0	0	0	0	4	0
7	(Tunisia)	MF	Chaker Zouagi	2	0	1	0	1	0	4	0
8	(Uzbekistan)	MF	Jovlon Ibrokhimov	3	0	0	0	0	0	3	0
9	(Japan)	MF	Minori Sato	3	0	1	0	0	0	4	0
10	(Uzbekistan)	FW	Eldor Shomurodov	1	0	0	0	1	0	2	0
14	(Uzbekistan)	FW	Bahodir Nasimov	2	0	2	0	1	0	5	0
16	(Uzbekistan)	MF	Dilshodbek Axmadaliev	1	0	0	0	0	0	1	0
17	(Uzbekistan)	MF	Dostonbek Khamdamov	6	0	0	0	2	0	8	0
19	(Uzbekistan)	FW	Zabikhillo Urinboev	2	0	0	0	1	0	3	0
21	(Uzbekistan)	MF	Sardorbek Azimov	1	0	1	0	0	0	2	0
22	(Uzbekistan)	DF	Rustam Ashurmatov	5	0	1	0	2	0	8	0
23	(Uzbekistan)	DF	Shohrux Gadoyev	1	0	0	0	0	0	1	0
25	(Uzbekistan)	GK	Murod Zukhurov	1	0	0	0	0	0	1	0
29	(Uzbekistan)	MF	Otabek Shukurov	3	1	2	0	1	0	6	1
30	(Croatia)	DF	Jurica Buljat	10	0	3	0	0	0	13	0
71	(Serbia)	MF	Aleksandar Alempijević	3	0	3	0	2	0	8	0
			TOTALS	56	1	14	0	11	0	81	1
