= 2015 FC Bunyodkor season =

FC Bunyodkor
2015 season
- Chairman: Bedil Alimov
- Manager: Sergey Lushan (until 22 September); Bahtiyor Babaev (from 23 September)
- Uzbek League: 4th
- Uzbekistan Cup: Runners-up
- AFC Champions League: Group Stage
- Top goalscorer: League: Dostonbek Khamdamov (10); All: Dostonbek Khamdamov (14)
Home colours	Away colours

The 2015 season is Bunyodkors 9th season in the Uzbek League in Uzbekistan.

== Club ==
=== Current technical staff ===
Position	Name
Head coach	(Uzbekistan) Bahtiyor Babaev
Assistant coach	(Uzbekistan) Yuriy Sarkisyan
Assistant coach	(Ukraine) Amet Memet
Assistant coach	(Uzbekistan) Mukhiddin Ortikov
Fitness coach	(Romania) Augustin Chiriță
Goalkeeping coach	(Uzbekistan) Abdusattor Rakhimov
Club doctor	(Uzbekistan) Qakhramon Nurmukhammedov

== Players ==
=== Squad ===
As of 17 August 2015

Note: Flags indicate national team as defined under FIFA eligibility rules; some limited exceptions apply. Players may hold more than one non-FIFA nationality.

No.	Pos.	Nation	Player
1	GK	UZB	Pavel Bugalo
2	DF	UZB	Akmal Shorakhmedov
4	DF	UZB	Hayrulla Karimov
5	DF	UZB	Dilshod Juraev
6	DF	UZB	Anvar Gafurov
7	MF	TUN	Chaker Zouagi
8	MF	UZB	Jovlon Ibrokhimov
9	MF	JPN	Minori Sato
13	DF	SRB	Ivan Milošević
14	MF	UZB	Vokhid Shodiev
17	MF	UZB	Dostonbek Khamdamov
19	FW	UZB	Zabikhillo Urinboev
20	MF	BIH	Samir Bekrić

No.	Pos.	Nation	Player
24	MF	UZB	Nuriddin Khasanov
25	GK	UZB	Murod Zukhurov
27	MF	UZB	Sardor Sabirkhodjaev
28	DF	UZB	Dilyorbek Irmatov
35	GK	UZB	Abdukarim Mukhammedov
39	FW	UZB	Eldor Shomurodov
42	MF	UZB	Khursid Giyosov
44	MF	UZB	Mirjamol Kosimov
45	GK	UZB	Akbar Turaev
48	DF	UZB	Akram Komilov
77	MF	UZB	Viktor Karpenko
88	FW	UZB	Anvar Rajabov

=== Reserve squad ===
The following players are listed as reserve players to play in 2015 Uzbek Youth League. They are registered for 2015 Uzbek League and are eligible to play for the first team.

As of 17 August 2015

Note: Flags indicate national team as defined under FIFA eligibility rules; some limited exceptions apply. Players may hold more than one non-FIFA nationality.

No.	Pos.	Nation	Player
29	MF	UZB	Akhror Umarjonov
32	FW	UZB	Georgiy Pogosov
34	MF	UZB	Zokirjon Nurmatov
36	DF	UZB	Shahzod Abdurakhimov
37	FW	UZB	Sanzhar Rikhsiboev
41	DF	UZB	Shahriyor Imomkhujaev
42	MF	UZB	Khurshid Giyasov
43	MF	UZB	Ergash Ismoilov
50	MF	UZB	Ibrokhim Gafurov
51	MF	UZB	Farkhod Nomozov

No.	Pos.	Nation	Player
59	MF	UZB	Nuriddin Khasanov
92	MF	UZB	Nodirjon Atadjanov
—	MF	UZB	Sardorbek Azimov
—	DF	UZB	Rustam Azamov
—	GK	UZB	Elyor Adkhamov
—	DF	UZB	Islom Kobilov
—	MF	UZB	Nurillo Takhtasinov
—	FW	UZB	Mirjakhon Mirakhmatov
—	FW	UZB	Javokhir Esonqulov

== Transfers ==
=== Winter 2014–15 ===
In: Note: Flags indicate national team as defined under FIFA eligibility rules; some limited exceptions apply. Players may hold more than one non-FIFA nationality.

No.	Pos.	Nation	Player
7	MF	TUN	Chaker Zouagi (from (Uzbekistan) Olmaliq)
11	FW	UZB	Mirzokhid Gofurov (from (Uzbekistan) Mashʼal Mubarek)
16	DF	UZB	Artyom Filiposyan (from (Uzbekistan) Lokomotiv Tashkent)
15	DF	UZB	Obid Jurabaev (from (Uzbekistan) Olmaliq)
29	MF	UZB	Otabek Shukurov (from (Uzbekistan) Mashʼal Mubarek)
37	MF	UZB	Doston Abdurakhmonov (from (Uzbekistan) Olmaliq)
39	FW	UZB	Eldor Shomurodov (from (Uzbekistan) Mashʼal Mubarek)

Out: Note: Flags indicate national team as defined under FIFA eligibility rules; some limited exceptions apply. Players may hold more than one non-FIFA nationality.

No.	Pos.	Nation	Player
3	DF	UZB	Shukurali Pulatov (to (Uzbekistan) Neftchi Farg'ona)
7	MF	UZB	Alibobo Rakhmatullaev (to (Uzbekistan) Buxoro)
11	FW	UKR	Oleksandr Pyschur (to (Kazakhstan) Taraz)
15	DF	UZB	Islom Inomov (to (Uzbekistan) Olmaliq)
30	DF	UZB	Khasan Askarov (to (Uzbekistan) Buxoro)
33	MF	UZB	Oleg Zoteev (to (Uzbekistan) Lokomotiv Tashkent)
37	MF	UZB	Doston Abdurakhmonov (to (Uzbekistan) Mash'al Mubarek)

=== Summer 2015 ===
In: Note: Flags indicate national team as defined under FIFA eligibility rules; some limited exceptions apply. Players may hold more than one non-FIFA nationality.

No.	Pos.	Nation	Player
77	MF	UZB	Viktor Karpenko (from (Uzbekistan) Shurtan Guzar)
88	FW	UZB	Anvar Rajabov (from (Uzbekistan) Olmaliq)
—	GK	UZB	Elyor Adkhamov (from (Uzbekistan) Bunyodkor-2)
—	DF	UZB	Islom Kobilov (from (Uzbekistan) Bunyodkor-2)
—	MF	UZB	Nurillo Takhtasinov (from (Uzbekistan) Bunyodkor-2)
—	FW	UZB	Mirjakhon Mirakhmatov (from (Uzbekistan) Bunyodkor-2)
—	FW	UZB	Javokhir Esonqulov (from (Uzbekistan) Bunyodkor-2)

Out: Note: Flags indicate national team as defined under FIFA eligibility rules; some limited exceptions apply. Players may hold more than one non-FIFA nationality.

No.	Pos.	Nation	Player
10	FW	UZB	Anvar Berdiev (to (Uzbekistan) FK Andijan)
11	MF	UZB	Mirzokhid Gofurov (to (Uzbekistan) Mash'al Mubarek)
15	DF	UZB	Obid Jurabaev (to (Uzbekistan) Olmaliq FK)
16	DF	UZB	Artyom Filiposyan (to (Uzbekistan) FK Dinamo Samarqand)
21	MF	UZB	Sardor Rashidov (to (Qatar) El Jaish)
29	MF	UZB	Otabek Shukurov (to (Uzbekistan) FK Buxoro)
40	FW	UZB	Timur Ayupov (to (Uzbekistan) FK Buxoro)
—	DF	UZB	Davron Valijonov
—	DF	UZB	Aziz Mamazoitov
—	FW	UZB	Aleksandr Kjamkhodera

== Friendly matches ==
=== Preseason ===
8 January 2015 Friendly	Feyenoord (Netherlands)	1 - 1	(Uzbekistan) Bunyodkor	Dubai
16:30	Vilhena 64'		Urinboev 43'

10 January 2015 Friendly	Al Shabab (United Arab Emirates)	0 - 5	(Uzbekistan) Bunyodkor	Dubai
18:05			T.Ayupov 11'; Berdiev 23'; Shomurodov 56', 78'; M.Gofurov 84'	Stadium: Maktoum Bin Rashid Al Maktoum Stadium

14 January 2015 Friendly	Persepolis (Iran)	3 - 1	(Uzbekistan) Bunyodkor	Dubai
18:00	Khaleghifar 35', 72'; Bengar 64'		D.Khamdamov 82'

14 January 2015 Friendly	Ittihad (Saudi Arabia)	1 - 0	(Uzbekistan) Bunyodkor	Dubai
17:15	Marquinho 45'

24 January 2015 Friendly	Bunyodkor	4 - 2	Metallurg Bekabad	Tashkent
	Berdiev 42', 45+1'; T.Ayupov 84', 88' (pen.)		Karimov 37' (pen.), 44' (pen.)

29 January 2015 Friendly	Viitorul (Romania)	2 - 2	(Uzbekistan) Bunyodkor	Antalya
			Bekrić 17'; Zouagi 40'

31 January 2015 Friendly	CSM Iasi (Romania)	1 - 1	(Uzbekistan) Bunyodkor	Antalya
			Bekrić

2 February 2015 Friendly	Zorya (Ukraine)	1 - 1	(Uzbekistan) Bunyodkor	Antalya
16:00 UTC+2	Ljubenović 56' (pen.)		Rashidov 51'

2 February 2015 Friendly	Daugava (Latvia)	2 - 0	(Uzbekistan) Bunyodkor	Antalya

4 February 2015 Friendly	Astana (Kazakhstan)	1 - 0	(Uzbekistan) Bunyodkor	Antalya
16:00 UTC+2	Shomko 86'

6 February 2015 Friendly	Jagiellonia (Poland)	1 - 1	(Uzbekistan) Bunyodkor	Antalya
15:30 UTC+2			T.Ayupov 36'

6 February 2015 Friendly	Changchun Yatai (China)	0 - 1	(Uzbekistan) Bunyodkor	Antalya
17:30 UTC+2			M.Gafurov 55'

12 February 2015 Friendly	Bunyodkor	4 - 0	Metallurg Bekabad	Tashkent
17:00	Rashidov; Zouagi; Shomurodov			Stadium: Bunyodkor Stadium

== Competitions ==
=== Uzbek League ===
==== League table ====
Pos	Team	Pld	W	D	L	GF	GA	GD	Pts	Qualification or relegation
2	Lokomotiv Tashkent	30	23	5	2	66	22	+44	74	2016 AFC Champions League group stage
3	Nasaf Qarshi	30	19	5	6	46	20	+26	62	2016 AFC Champions League group stage
4	Bunyodkor	30	18	5	7	44	19	+25	59	2016 AFC Champions League Third qualifying round
5	Neftchi Farg'ona	30	16	4	10	41	30	+11	52	
6	Olmaliq FK	30	12	8	10	53	49	+4	44	

Updated to match(es) played on 22 November 2015. Source: Uzbekistan Professional Football League
Rules for classification: 1) points; 2) goal difference; 3) number of goals scored.

==== Results summary ====
Overall								Home						Away					
Pld	W	D	L	GF	GA	GD	Pts	W	D	L	GF	GA	GD	W	D	L	GF	GA	GD
30	18	5	7	44	16	+28	59	11	2	2	28	4	+24	7	3	5	16	12	+4

Last updated: 19 November 2015.
Source: Soccerway

==== Results by round ====
Round	1	2	3	4	5	6	7	8	9	10	11	12	13	14	15	16	17	18	19	20	21	22	23	24	25	26	27	28	29	30
Ground	H	A	A	H	A	A	A	H	H	A	H	A	H	A	H	A	H	A	H	A	H	A	H	A	A	H	A	H	A	
Result	W	W	L	W	W	L	L	W	W	L	D	W	W	W	W	W	W	D	L	W	W	L	W	L	D	W	D	W	D	W
Position	3	1	8	7	6	7	7	6	6	6	6	6	6	5	5	4	4	4	4	4	4	4	4	5	4	4	4	4	4	4

Source: Soccerway
A = Away; H = Home; W = Win; D = Draw; L = Loss

==== Results ====
12 March 2015 1	Bunyodkor	2 - 0	FK Buxoro	Tashkent
18:30 UZT (UTC+5)	Zouagi 6'; M.Gofurov (yellow card) 11' (goal) 45+1'; Shodiev (yellow card) 12'; Rashidov (yellow card) 29'; Sato (yellow card) 39'; Filiposyan (yellow card) 59'	Summary	D.Abibulaev (yellow card) 56'	Stadium: Bunyodkor Stadium; Attendance: 1,594; Referee: Ravshan Irmatov

22 March 2015 2	Qizilqum Zarafshon	0 - 2	Bunyodkor	Zarafshon
16:00 UZT (UTC+5)	A.Sanaev (yellow card) 15'; Shevchenko (yellow card) 50'; A.Usmanov (yellow card) 68'	Summary	Filiposyan (yellow card) 42'; Shodiev 66', 68' (yellow card) 82' (yellow-red card) 90+1'; Turaev (yellow card) 80'	Stadium: Yoshlar Stadium; Attendance: 11,897; Referee: Vladislav Tseytlin

6 July 2015 3	Bunyodkor	3 - 0	Shurtan Guzar	Tashkent
20:00 UZT (UTC+5)		Summary		Stadium: Bunyodkor Stadium; Attendance: 522; Referee: R. Bobomuradov

13 April 2015 4	Lokomotiv Tashkent	3 - 0	Bunyodkor	Tashkent
16:00 UZT (UTC+5)	Abdukholiqov 46' (pen.); J.O.Hasanov 54'; I.Alibaev (yellow card) 73'; Koryan (yellow card) 88'	Summary	S.Sabirkhodjaev (yellow card) 46'; Filiposyan (yellow card) 50'; E.Shomurodov (yellow card) 61' (yellow-red card) 66'; Sato (yellow card) 86'	Stadium: Lokomotiv Stadium; Attendance: 3,708; Referee: Ravshan Irmatov

17 April 2015 5	Bunyodkor	2 - 1	Navbahor Namangan	Tashkent
19:00 UZT (UTC+5)	D.Khamdamov (yellow card) 25' (goal) 70'; Gafurov 56'; O.Jurabaev (yellow card) 84'	Summary	D.Djabbarov (yellow card) 20'; Bakayev (yellow card) 29'; S.Shikhov 88'; B.Akbarov (yellow card) 90+2'	Stadium: Bunyodkor Stadium; Attendance: 1,812; Referee: Dmitiry Pisligin

26 April 2015 6	Metallurg Bekabad	1 - 2	Bunyodkor	Tashkent
16:00 UZT (UTC+5)	Karimov 25' (pen.)	Summary	D.Khamdamov 8'; Turaev (yellow card) 24'; Shodiev 86'	Stadium: Metallurg Bekabad Stadium; Attendance: 3,162; Referee: Aziz Asymov

2 May 2015 7	Bunyodkor	0 - 1	Neftchi Farg'ona	Tashkent
18:00 UZT (UTC+5)	Sato (yellow card) 12'; Shodiev (red card) 83'	Summary	D.Irmatov (yellow card) 12'; R.Ahmedov 23' (pen.); S.Pulatov (yellow card) 57'; M.Saidov (yellow card) 78'; A.Makhstaliev (yellow card) 90+1'	Stadium: Bunyodkor Stadium; Attendance: 2,511; Referee: Valentin Kovalenko

10 May 2015 8	Sogdiana Jizzakh	2 - 1	Bunyodkor	Zaamin
16:30 UZT (UTC+5)	J.Khakimov 53', 65'; S.Abdullayev (yellow card) 65'; S.Kobilov (yellow card) 82'; M.Spiridonov (yellow card) 83'	Summary	Karimov (yellow card) 68'; Ibrokhimov (yellow card) 69'; Sato (yellow card) 82'; Zouagi 83'	Stadium: Zaamin Stadium; Attendance: 5,103; Referee: Timur Tukhtasinov

15 May 2015 9	Bunyodkor	4 - 0	Mash'al Mubarek	Tashkent
18:30 UZT (UTC+5)	Rashidov 13'; T.Ayupov 16'; S.Sabirkhodjaev 21'; Zouagi 36'	Summary	I.Babakhanov (yellow card) 71'	Stadium: Bunyodkor Stadium; Attendance: 1,430; Referee: Bakhtiyor Namazov

23 May 2015 10	Bunyodkor	1 - 0	FK Samarqand-Dinamo	Tashkent
19:00 UZT (UTC+5)	Karimov (yellow card) 41'; Zouagi (yellow card) 70'; Rashidov 71'	Summary		Stadium: Bunyodkor Stadium; Attendance: 1,080; Referee: Zokir Kadyrov

31 May 2015 11	Pakhtakor	1 - 0	Bunyodkor	Tashkent
19:00 UZT (UTC+5)	Sergeev 69'	Summary	T.Ayupov (yellow card) 17'; S.Sabirkhodjaev (yellow card) 82'	Stadium: Pakhtakor Stadium; Attendance: 5,617; Referee: Ravshan Irmatov

7 June 2015 12	Bunyodkor	1 - 1	Nasaf Qarshi	Tashkent
19:00 UZT (UTC+5)	Ibrokhimov (yellow card) 38'; Shorakhmedov (yellow card) 54'; Milošević (yellow card) 72'	Summary	E.Baidullaev (yellow card) 43'; Karimov (yellow card) 47'; Sayfiev (yellow card) 54'	Stadium: Bunyodkor Stadium; Attendance: 3,869; Referee: Valentin Kovalenko

20 June 2015 13	FK Andijan	0 - 1	Bunyodkor	Andijan
18:30 UZT (UTC+5)	R.Rakhmonov (yellow card) 31'; D.Tursunov (yellow card) 53'; R.Rakhmanov (yellow card) 75'; T.Vasilyev (yellow card) 89'	Soccerway	Sato 37'; Shorakhmedov (yellow card) 68'; D.Khamdamov 90+2'	Stadium: Soghlom Avlod Stadium; Attendance: 5,397; Referee: Bakhityor Namazov

27 June 2015 14	Bunyodkor	1 - 0	Olmaliq FK	Tashkent
19:00 UZT (UTC+5)	Karimov (yellow card) 45+1'; Shomurodov 49'	Summary	Abdumuminov (yellow card) 19'; Yevgeni Gogol (yellow card) 51'	Stadium: Bunyodkor Stadium; Attendance: 1,058; Referee: Vladislav Tseytlin

1 July 2015 15	Kokand 1912	0 - 1	Bunyodkor	Kokand
18:00 UZT (UTC+5)	I.Ilyin (yellow card) 82'; B.Akramov (yellow card) 87'; Golban (yellow card) 90+2'	Summary	Milošević (yellow card) 10'; Khamdamov 77'; Bekrić (yellow card) 80'	Stadium: Kokand Stadium; Attendance: 6,170; Referee: Zokir Kadyrov

6 July 2015 3	Bunyodkor	3 - 0	Shurtan Guzar	Tashkent
20:00 UZT (UTC+5)	Gafurov (yellow card) 21'; Shomurodov 31'; Khamdamov 36'; Zouagi 52'	Summary	S.Berdiyev (yellow card) 73'	Stadium: Bunyodkor Stadium; Attendance: 522; Referee: Rustam Bobomuradov

2 August 2015 16	FK Buxoro	1 - 2	Bunyodkor	Bukhoro
19:00 UZT (UTC+5)	Gheorghiev 59'	Summary	Shomurodov 45+2'; Komilov (yellow card) 66'; Khamdamov 70'; Ibrokhimov (yellow card) 71'	Stadium: Buxoro Arena; Attendance: 9,701; Referee: Timur Tukhtasinov

7 August 2015 17	Bunyodkor	2 - 1	Qizilqum Zarafshon	Tashkent
19:00 UZT (UTC+5)	Shomurodov 8', 31'; Khamdamov (yellow card) 44'; Juraev (yellow card) 51'; Shodiev (yellow card) 72'; Komilov (yellow card) 77'	Summary	Olimov 13'; A.Rustamov (yellow card) 72'	Stadium: Bunyodkor Stadium; Attendance: 1,068; Referee: Olim Talibdjanov

16 August 2015 18	Shurtan	0 - 0	Bunyodkor	Bukhoro
18:00 UZT (UTC+5)	U.Eshmuradov (yellow card) 41'; S.Sharipov (yellow card) 72'; D.Stanojević (yellow card) 90+3'	Summary	Rajabov (yellow card) 90+5'	Stadium: G'uzor Stadium; Attendance: 5,527; Referee: Bakhtiyor Namazov

22 August 2015 19	Bunyodkor	0 - 1	Lokomotiv Tashkent	Tashkent
19:00 UZT (UTC+5)		Summary	S.Shoakhmedov 15'; S.Mustafoev (yellow card) 41'	Stadium: Bunyodkor Stadium; Attendance: 2,765; Referee: Zokir Kadyrov

27 August 2015 20	Navbahor Namangan	0 - 1	Bunyodkor	Namangan
17:00 UZT (UTC+5)	A.Akhmedov (yellow card) 17'; O.Valijonov (yellow card) 54'	Summary	Sato (yellow card) 25' (goal) 87'; Karimov (yellow card) 40'; Juraev (yellow card) 60'; Komilov (yellow card) 62'	Stadium: Markaziy Stadium (Namangan); Attendance: 8,215; Referee: Ilgiz Tantashev

11 September 2015 21	Bunyodkor	1 - 0	Metallurg Bekabad	Tashkent
18:00 UZT (UTC+5)	Ashurmatov (yellow card) 7'; Shomurodov (yellow card) 69'; Zouagi 74'	Summery	S.Norbekov (yellow card) 51'; J.Mirabdullaev (yellow card) 53'; M.Sulaymanov (yellow card) 54'; Karimov (yellow card) 90+1'	Stadium: Bunyodkor Stadium; Attendance: 424; Referee: Bakhtiyor Namazov

20 September 2015 22	Neftchi Farg'ona	2 - 0	Bunyodkor	Fergana
17:00 UZT (UTC+5)	Cașcaval 3'; U.Kadirov (yellow card) 36'; S.Pulatov (yellow card) 64'; M.Bobojonov 90+1'; D.Irmatov (yellow card) 90+2'	Summary	Urinboev (yellow card) 17'; Khamdamov (yellow card) 21'; Milošević (yellow card) 48'; Komilov (yellow card) 65'	Stadium: New Fergana Stadium; Attendance: 5,160; Referee: Vladislav Tseytlin

24 September 2015 23	Bunyodkor	2 - 0	Sogdiana Jizzakh	Tashkent
18:00 UZT (UTC+5)	Zouagi (yellow card) 19' (goal) 37' (pen.); Shomurodov 56'	Summary	I.Ganiev (yellow card) 13'; J.Khakimov (yellow card) 23'; E.Oripov (yellow card) 36'; I.Isakjanov (yellow card) 45+2'	Stadium: Bunyodkor Stadium; Attendance: 712; Referee: Aziz Asymov

30 September 2015 24	Mash'al Mubarek	3 - 2	Bunyodkor	Muborak
16:30 UZT (UTC+5)	Bukatkin 12'; S.Shaymanov (yellow card) 28'; S.Khamroev 63' (pen.); Z.Turaev 74'; A.Amonov (yellow card) 75'	Summary	Zouagi 10' (pen.); Shomurodov 30'; Shodiev (yellow card) 45+1'; Karimov (red card) 65'	Stadium: Bahrom Vafoev Stadium; Attendance: 2,341; Referee: Khasan Ruziev

12 October 2015 25	FK Samarqand-Dinamo	1 - 1	Bunyodkor	Samarkand
16:00 UZT (UTC+5)	Murzoev 13' (yellow card) 52'; Filiposyan (yellow card) 61'; I.Yunusov (yellow card) 68'	Summary	Ashurmatov (yellow card) 18'; Komilov (yellow card) 68'; Juraev 71'; Zouagi (yellow card) 87'; Karpenko (yellow card) 90+3'	Stadium: Olimpia Stadium; Attendance: 10,056; Referee: Vladislav Tseytlin

21 October 2015 26	Bunyodkor	2 - 0	Pakhtakor	Tashkent
	Shodiev (yellow card) 14'; Shorakhmedov 49'; Zouagi (yellow card) 60'; Khamdamov 75'	Summary	Krimets (yellow card) 35'; Kozak (yellow card) 59'	Stadium: Bunyodkor Stadium; Attendance: 2,678; Referee: Sherzod Kasymov

26 October 2015 27	Nasaf Qarshi	0 - 0	Bunyodkor	Qarshi
	E.Baidullaev (yellow card) 67'	Summary	Ashurmatov (yellow card) 29'; Milošević (yellow card) 64'	Stadium: Qarshi Stadium; Attendance: 10,570; Referee: Valentin Kovalenko

31 October 2015 28	Bunyodkor	4 -0	FK Andijan	Tashkent
	Sato (yellow card) 50' (goal) 78'; Shodiev 58'; Khamdamov 63', 71'; Ashurmatov (yellow card) 66'	Summary	A.Olimov (yellow card) 27'; F.Bekmurodov (yellow card) 50'	Stadium: Bunyodkor Stadium; Attendance: 1,048; Referee: Vadim Agishev

4 November 2015 29	Olmaliq FK	1 - 1	Bunyodkor	Olmaliq
	Salomov 58'	Summary	Shodiev 12'	Stadium: New Olmaliq Stadium; Attendance: 2,342; Referee: Ilgiz Tantashev

19 November 2015 30	Bunyodkor	5 - 0	Kokand 1912	Tashkent
	Karpenko 8' (pen.); Sato 27' (yellow card) 59'; Juraev (yellow card) 34'; Shodiev 60', 70'; Khamdamov 82'	Summary	R.Matniyozov (red card) 85'	Stadium: Bunyodkor Stadium; Attendance: 817; Referee: Dmitiry Pisligin

=== Uzbek Cup ===
19 May 2015 Round of 16, 1st leg	Bunyodkor	1 - 0	Obod Tashkent	Tashkent
19:00 UZT (UTC+5)	Bekrić 3'; Milošević (yellow card) 49'	Summary	A.Gulamhojaev (yellow card) 25'; S.Norxonov (yellow card) 37'	Stadium: Bunyodkor Stadium; Attendance: 958; Referee: Ilgiz Tantashev

24 June 2015 Round of 16, 2nd leg	Obod Tashkent	1 - 1 (1 - 2 agg.)	Bunyodkor	Tashkent
17:00 UZT (UTC+5)	A.Boboev (yellow card) 45'; S.Turakulov (yellow card) 67'; K.Tadjibaev 86'	Summary	M.Gofurov (yellow card) 34'; Bekrić 84'	Stadium: UFF Stadium; Attendance: 315; Referee: Vadim Agishev

9 July 2015 Quarterfinal, 1st leg	Sogdiana Jizzakh	1 - 2	Bunyodkor	Jizzakh
19:00 UZT (UTC+5)	J.Khakimov 39' (yellow card) 45+1'; D.Ikromov (yellow card) 78'	Summary	Khamdamov 2', 48' (yellow card) 90+2'; Filiposyan (yellow card) 45+1'; Shorakhmedov (yellow card) 80'	Stadium: Sogdiana Stadium; Attendance: 10,150; Referee: Viktor Serazetdinov

27 July 2015 Quarterfinal, 2nd leg	Bunyodkor	2 - 0 (4 - 1 agg.)	Sogdiana Jizzakh	Tashkent
UZT (UTC+5)	Ashurmatov (yellow card) 38'; Milošević (yellow card) 71'; Khamdamov 73'; Shodiev 81'	Summary		Stadium: Bunyodkor Stadium; Attendance: 620; Referee: Sherzod Kasymov

12 August 2015 Semifinal, 1st leg	Pakhtakor Tashkent	2 - 3	Bunyodkor	Tashkent
19:00 UZT (UTC+5)	A.Orahovac 24'; Andreev (yellow card) 60'; Makharadze 68'	Summary	Khamdamov 3'; Karimov (yellow card) 30'; Urinboev 35'; Ashurmatov (yellow card) 58'; Komilov 75'; Juraev (yellow card) 89'; Sato (yellow card) 90+1'	Stadium: Pakhtakor Markaziy Stadium; Attendance: 4,762; Referee: Viktor Serazetdinov

16 September 2015 Semifinal, 2nd leg	Bunyodkor	1 - 0 (4 - 2 agg.)	Pakhtakor Tashkent	Tashkent
18:00 UZT (UTC+5)	Sato (yellow card) 11'; Milošević (yellow card) 15'; Shomurodov 25'; Karimov (yellow card) 34'; Komilov (yellow card) 60'	Summary	Tajiev (yellow card) 34'; Kozak (yellow card) 74'	Stadium: Bunyodkor Stadium; Attendance: 5,012; Referee: Viktor Serazetdinov

==== Final ====
17 October 2015	Bunyodkor	1 - 2	Nasaf Qarshi	Jizzakh
17:00 UZT (UTC+5)	Milošević (yellow card) 15'; Komilov (yellow card) 39' (red card) 64'; S.Azamov 81' (o.g.)	Summary	Mukhammadiev (yellow card) 31'; Geworkýan 70'; S.Azamov 75'; Gadoev (yellow card) 78'; Suyunov (yellow card) 90+1'	Stadium: Sogdiana Stadium; Referee: Ravshan Irmatov

=== AFC Champions League ===
==== Play-off round ====
17 February 2015	Bunyodkor (Uzbekistan)	2 - 1	(United Arab Emirates) Al Jazira	Tashkent, Uzbekistan
17:00 UZT (UTC+5)	Komilov (yellow card) 22'; Shodiev 23'; Turaev (yellow card) 45+1'; Rashidov 52'; Sato (yellow card) 61'; Ibrokhimov (yellow card) 61'	Report	Saeed (yellow card) 22'; Esmaeel (yellow card) 41'; Mabkhout 45+3' (pen.); Sabeal (red card) 90+1'	Stadium: Bunyodkor Stadium

==== Group stage ====
Pos	Team	Pld	W	D	L	GF	GA	GD	Pts	Qualification
1	(Qatar) Lekhwiya	6	4	1	1	9	5	+4	13	Advance to knockout stage
2	(Iran) Persepolis	6	4	0	2	7	7	0	12	Advance to knockout stage
3	(Saudi Arabia) Al-Nassr	6	2	2	2	7	6	+1	8	
4	(Uzbekistan) Bunyodkor	6	0	1	5	2	7	−5	1	

Source: AFC

24 February 2015 1	Al-Nassr (Saudi Arabia)	1 - 1	(Uzbekistan) Bunyodkor	Riyadh, Saudi Arabia
22:25 UZT (UTC+5)	Estoyanoff 51'	Report	Urinboev 14'; Zouagi (yellow card) 16'; Sato (yellow card) 60'; Ibrokhimov (yellow card) 75'	Stadium: King Fahd International Stadium; Attendance: 23,664; Referee: Muhammad Taqi Aljaafari Bin Jahari (Singapore)

3 March 2015 2	Bunyodkor (Uzbekistan)	0 - 1	(Iran) Persepolis	Tashkent, Uzbekistan
18:00 UZT (UTC+5)	Komilov (yellow card) 30'	Report	Nouri 20' (pen.) (yellow card) 45+3'; Bengar (yellow card) 58'	Stadium: Bunyodkor Stadium; Attendance: 21,285; Referee: Kim Dong-jin (South Korea)

17 March 2015 3	Bunyodkor (Uzbekistan)	0 - 1	(Qatar) Lekhwiya	Tashkent, Uzbekistan
UZT (UTC+5)		Report	Nam 28' (pen.); Mohammad (yellow card) 51'	Stadium: Bunyodkor Stadium

8 April 2015 4	Lekhwiya (Qatar)	1 - 0	(Uzbekistan) Bunyodkor	Doha, Qatar
20:30 UZT (UTC+5)	Weiss 43'	Report	Shorakhmedov (yellow card) 45+1'; Karimov (yellow card) 61'	Stadium: Abdullah bin Khalifa Stadium; Attendance: 3,188; Referee: Abdullah Al Hilali (Oman)

22 April 2015 5	Bunyodkor (Uzbekistan)	0 - 1	(Saudi Arabia) Al-Nassr	Tashkent, Uzbekistan
19:00 UZT (UTC+5)	Gafurov (yellow card) 27' (yellow-red card) 70'; Karimov (yellow card) 81'	Report	Wila (yellow card) 14'; Mierzejewski 33'; Al-Jebreen (yellow card) 61'; Al-Sahlawi (yellow card) 88'	Stadium: Bunyodkor Stadium

6 May 2015 6	Persepolis (Iran)	2 - 1	(Uzbekistan) Bunyodkor	Tehran, Iran
21:05 UZT (UTC+5)	Nouri 49' (pen.); Jurabaev 73' (o.g.)	Report	Filiposyan (yellow card) 34'; Rashidov 61'; T.Ayupov (yellow card) 67'; Zouagi (yellow card) 89'	Stadium: Azadi Stadium; Attendance: 100,000; Referee: Yudai Yamamoto (Japan)

== Squad statistics ==
As of match played 19 November 2015

=== Appearances and goals ===
No.	Pos	Nat	Player	Total		Uzbek League		Uzbek Cup		AFC Champions League	
No.	Pos	Nat	Player	Apps	Goals	Apps	Goals	Apps	Goals	Apps	Goals
1	GK	(Uzbekistan) UZB	Pavel Bugalo	3	0	2	0	1	0	0	0
2	DF	(Uzbekistan) UZB	Akmal Shorakhmedov	39	1	27	1	6	0	6	0
4	DF	(Uzbekistan) UZB	Hayrulla Karimov	26	0	20+1	0	3	0	2	0
5	DF	(Uzbekistan) UZB	Dilshod Juraev	16	1	10+3	1	2+1	0	0	0
6	DF	(Uzbekistan) UZB	Anvar Gafurov	21	1	17	1	3	0	1	0
7	MF	(Tunisia) TUN	Chaker Zouagi	36	7	22+3	7	5	0	5+1	0
8	MF	(Uzbekistan) UZB	Jovlon Ibrokhimov	18	0	11	0	3	0	4	0
9	MF	(Japan) JPN	Minori Sato	40	3	28	3	5	0	6+1	0
13	DF	(Serbia) SRB	Ivan Milošević	32	0	21+1	0	5	0	5	0
14	MF	(Uzbekistan) UZB	Vokhid Shodiev	33	9	14+8	7	1+4	1	3+3	1
17	MF	(Uzbekistan) UZB	Dostonbek Khamdamov	38	14	19+7	10	6	4	3+3	0
19	FW	(Uzbekistan) UZB	Zabikhillo Urinboev	26	2	11+7	0	4	1	1+3	1
20	MF	(Bosnia and Herzegovina) BIH	Samir Bekrić	21	2	4+8	0	2+1	2	5+1	0
22	DF	(Uzbekistan) UZB	Rustam Ashurmatov	15	0	10+1	0	4	0	0	0
24	MF	(Uzbekistan) UZB	Nuriddin Khasanov	1	0	0	0	0+1	0	0	0
25	GK	(Uzbekistan) UZB	Murod Zukhurov	25	0	20	0	4	0	1	0
27	MF	(Uzbekistan) UZB	Sardor Sabirkhodjaev	24	1	11+7	1	3	0	2+1	0
39	FW	(Uzbekistan) UZB	Eldor Shomurodov	33	7	18+6	6	5	1	2+2	0
42	MF	(Uzbekistan) UZB	Khursid Giyosov	1	0	0	0	1	0	0	0
43	MF	(Uzbekistan) UZB	Ergash Ismoilov	1	0	0+1	0	0	0	0	0
45	GK	(Uzbekistan) UZB	Akbar Turaev	16	0	8	0	2	0	6	0
48	DF	(Uzbekistan) UZB	Akram Komilov	24	1	12+3	0	4+1	1	4	0
77	MF	(Uzbekistan) UZB	Victor Karpenko	15	1	8+4	1	0+3	0	0	0
88	FW	(Uzbekistan) UZB	Anvar Rajabov	7	0	3+2	0	1+1	0	0	0
	MF	(Uzbekistan) UZB	Sardorbek Azimov	1	0	0	0	0+1	0	0	0
Players who left Bunyodkor during the season:
10	FW	(Uzbekistan) UZB	Anvar Berdiev	3	0	0+1	0	2	0	0	0
11	FW	(Uzbekistan) UZB	Mirzokhid Gofurov	15	1	6+2	1	1+1	0	4+1	0
15	DF	(Uzbekistan) UZB	Obid Jurabaev	15	0	7+3	0	2	0	3	0
16	DF	(Uzbekistan) UZB	Artyom Filiposyan	17	0	6+3	0	2	0	6	0
21	FW	(Uzbekistan) UZB	Sardor Rashidov	20	4	9+3	2	1	0	6+1	2
29	MF	(Uzbekistan) UZB	Otabek Shukurov	4	0	0+2	0	2	0	0	0
40	FW	(Uzbekistan) UZB	Timur Ayupov	12	1	6+2	1	0+1	0	2+1	0

=== Goal scorers ===
Place	Position	Nation	Number	Name	Uzbek League	Uzbekistan Cup	AFC Champions League	Total
1	MF	(Uzbekistan)	17	Dostonbek Khamdamov	10	4	0	14
2	MF	(Uzbekistan)	14	Vokhid Shodiev	7	1	1	9
3	FW	(Uzbekistan)	39	Eldor Shomurodov	7	1	0	8
4	MF	(Tunisia)	7	Chaker Zouagi	7	0	0	7
5	MF	(Japan)	9	Minori Sato	4	0	0	4
5	FW	(Uzbekistan)	21	Sardor Rashidov	2	0	2	4
7	MF	(Bosnia and Herzegovina)	20	Samir Bekrić	0	2	0	2
7	FW	(Uzbekistan)	19	Zabikhillo Urinboev	0	1	1	2
9	FW	(Uzbekistan)	11	Mirzokhid Gofurov	1	0	0	1
9	DF	(Uzbekistan)	6	Anvar Gafurov	1	0	0	1
9	MF	(Uzbekistan)	27	Sardor Sabirkhodjaev	1	0	0	1
9	FW	(Uzbekistan)	40	Timur Ayupov	1	0	0	1
9	DF	(Uzbekistan)	5	Dilshod Juraev	1	0	0	1
9	DF	(Uzbekistan)	2	Akmal Shorakhmedov	1	0	0	1
9	MF	(Uzbekistan)	77	Victor Karpenko	1	0	0	1
9	DF	(Uzbekistan)	48	Akram Komilov	0	1	0	1
9				Own goal	0	1	0	1
				TOTALS	44	11	4	59

=== Disciplinary record ===
Number	Nation	Position	Name	Uzbek League		Uzbekistan Cup		AFC Champions League		Total	
Number	Nation	Position	Name	Yellow card	Red card	Yellow card	Red card	Yellow card	Red card	Yellow card	Red card
2	(Uzbekistan)	DF	Akmal Shorakhmedov	2	0	1	0	1	0	4	0
4	(Uzbekistan)	DF	Hayrulla Karimov	4	1	2	0	2	0	8	1
5	(Uzbekistan)	DF	Dilshod Juraev	3	0	1	0	0	0	4	0
6	(Uzbekistan)	DF	Anvar Gafurov	1	0	0	0	2	1	3	1
7	(Tunisia)	MF	Chaker Zouagi	4	0	0	0	2	0	6	0
8	(Uzbekistan)	MF	Jovlon Ibrokhimov	3	0	0	0	2	0	5	0
9	(Japan)	MF	Minori Sato	7	0	2	0	2	0	11	0
11	(Uzbekistan)	FW	Mirzokhid Gofurov	1	0	1	0	0	0	2	0
13	(Serbia)	DF	Ivan Milošević	4	0	4	0	0	0	8	0
14	(Uzbekistan)	MF	Vokhid Shodiev	6	2	0	0	0	0	6	2
15	(Uzbekistan)	DF	Obid Jurabaev	1	0	0	0	0	0	1	0
16	(Uzbekistan)	DF	Artyom Filiposyan	3	0	1	0	1	0	5	0
17	(Uzbekistan)	MF	Dostonbek Khamdamov	3	0	1	0	0	0	4	0
19	(Uzbekistan)	FW	Zabikhillo Urinboev	1	0	0	0	0	0	1	0
20	(Bosnia and Herzegovina)	MF	Samir Bekrić	1	0	0	0	0	0	1	0
21	(Uzbekistan)	FW	Sardor Rashidov	1	0	0	0	0	0	1	0
22	(Uzbekistan)	DF	Rustam Ashurmatov	4	0	2	0	0	0	6	0
27	(Uzbekistan)	MF	Sardor Sabirkhodjaev	2	0	0	0	0	0	2	0
39	(Uzbekistan)	FW	Eldor Shomurodov	3	1	0	0	0	0	3	1
40	(Uzbekistan)	FW	Timur Ayupov	2	0	0	0	0	0	2	0
45	(Uzbekistan)	GK	Akbar Turaev	2	0	0	0	1	0	3	0
48	(Uzbekistan)	DF	Akram Komilov	5	0	3	1	2	0	10	1
77	(Uzbekistan)	MF	Viktor Karpenko	1	0	0	0	0	0	1	0
88	(Uzbekistan)	FW	Anvar Rajabov	1	0	0	0	0	0	1	0
			TOTALS	64	4	15	0	19	2	98	6
