= 2013 FC Bunyodkor season =

FC Bunyodkor
2013 season
- Chairman: Tulagan Djuraev
- Manager: Mirjalol Qosimov
- Uzbek League: Champions
- Uzbekistan Cup: Winner
- AFC Champions League: Round of 16 vs Buriram United
- Top goalscorer: League: Oleksandr Pyschur (18); All: Oleksandr Pyschur (26)
- Highest home attendance: 11,672 vs Buriram United; 21 May 2013
- Lowest home attendance: 764 vs Sogdiana Jizzakh; 4 March 2013
- Average home league attendance: 4,058 18 July 2013
Home colours	Away colours

The 2013 season was Bunyodkors 7th season in the Uzbek League in Uzbekistan. Bunyodkor completed first treble in the season. They completed a Domestic double winning both the League and Cup. Also Bunyodkor youth team won 2013 Uzbek Youth League. Bunyodkor also competed in the AFC Champions League, reaching the Round of 16 stage before being knocked out by Buriram United of Thailand.

== Club ==
=== Current technical staff ===
Position	Name
Manager	(Uzbekistan) Mirjalol Qosimov
Assistant coach	(Uzbekistan) Hikmat Irgashev
Assistant coach	(Uzbekistan) Murod Otajonov
Fitness coach	(Uzbekistan) Alexander Volkov
Goalkeeping coach	(Uzbekistan) Abdusattar Rakhimov
Club doctor	(Uzbekistan) Qakhramon Nurmukhammedov

== Squad ==
As of 28 June 2013

Note: Flags indicate national team as defined under FIFA eligibility rules; some limited exceptions apply. Players may hold more than one non-FIFA nationality.

No.	Pos.	Nation	Player
1	GK	UZB	Ignatiy Nesterov
2	DF	UZB	Akmal Shorahmedov
3	DF	UZB	Abduqahhor Hojiakbarov
4	DF	UZB	Hayrulla Karimov
5	DF	UZB	Dilshod Juraev
6	DF	UZB	Anvar Gafurov
7	MF	SRB	Marko Blažić
8	MF	UZB	Jovlon Ibrokhimov
9	FW	UZB	Igor Taran
11	FW	UKR	Oleksandr Pyschur
13	MF	UZB	Lutfulla Turaev
14	MF	UZB	Alibobo Rakhmatullaev
15	MF	UZB	Miraziz Jalalov
16	DF	UZB	Artyom Filiposyan

No.	Pos.	Nation	Player
19	MF	UZB	Jasur Hasanov
21	FW	UZB	Sardor Rashidov
23	DF	UZB	Sakhob Juraev
25	GK	UZB	Murod Zukhurov
26	DF	UZB	Javlon Mirabdullaev
27	MF	UZB	Sardor Sabirkhodjaev
28	DF	UZB	Kamoliddin Tadjibaev
29	FW	UZB	Anvar Berdiev
33	MF	UZB	Oleg Zoteev
35	GK	UZB	Zafar Safaev
44	MF	UZB	Mirjamol Kosimov
45	GK	UZB	Akbar Turaev
46	FW	UZB	Zabikhillo Urinboev

== Transfers ==
=== Winter 2012-13 ===
In: Note: Flags indicate national team as defined under FIFA eligibility rules; some limited exceptions apply. Players may hold more than one non-FIFA nationality.

No.	Pos.	Nation	Player
7	MF	SRB	Marko Blažić (from (Russia) FC Amkar Perm)
9	FW	UZB	Igor Taran (from (Uzbekistan) FC Shurtan Guzar)
11	FW	UKR	Oleksandr Pyschur (from (Ukraine) Obolon Kyiv)
18	MF	UZB	Fozil Musaev (from (Uzbekistan) Nasaf Qarshi)
25	GK	UZB	Murod Zukhurov (from (Uzbekistan) Nasaf Qarshi)
33	MF	UZB	Oleg Zoteev (from (Uzbekistan) Olmaliq FK)
—	MF	UZB	Yannis Mandzukas (end of loan (Uzbekistan) Mash'al Mubarek)

Out: Note: Flags indicate national team as defined under FIFA eligibility rules; some limited exceptions apply. Players may hold more than one non-FIFA nationality.

No.	Pos.	Nation	Player
9	FW	UZB	Ilkhom Shomurodov (end of loan from (Uzbekistan) Nasaf Qarshi)
10	MF	UZB	Shavkat Salomov (to (Kazakhstan) FC Zhetysu)
18	DF	SRB	Slavoljub Đorđević
22	MF	UZB	Viktor Karpenko (to (Uzbekistan) Lokomotiv Tashkent)
28	MF	UZB	Ruslan Melziddinov (to (Uzbekistan) Lokomotiv Tashkent)
31	FW	UZB	Rasuljon Shukhratov (to (Uzbekistan) Navbahor Namangan)
33	MF	SVK	Ján Kozák
35	GK	UZB	Viktor Mochalov (to (Uzbekistan) Navbahor Namangan)
—	MF	UZB	Yannis Mandzukas (to (Uzbekistan) Qizilqum Zarafshon)

=== Players on Trial ===
The following players have been on trial during training camps in January–February, 2013

Note: Flags indicate national team as defined under FIFA eligibility rules; some limited exceptions apply. Players may hold more than one non-FIFA nationality.

No.	Pos.	Nation	Player
—	FW	UKR	Oleksandr Pyschur ( (Ukraine) Obolon Kyiv)
—	MF	MNE	Miloš Stojčev ( (Kazakhstan) FC Akzhayik)
—	FW	MNE	Admir Adrović ( (Montenegro) FK Budućnost Podgorica)

=== Summer 2013 ===
In: Note: Flags indicate national team as defined under FIFA eligibility rules; some limited exceptions apply. Players may hold more than one non-FIFA nationality.

No.	Pos.	Nation	Player
29	FW	UZB	Anvar Berdiev (from (Uzbekistan) Neftchi Farg'ona)

Out: Note: Flags indicate national team as defined under FIFA eligibility rules; some limited exceptions apply. Players may hold more than one non-FIFA nationality.

No.	Pos.	Nation	Player
18	MF	UZB	Fozil Musaev (to (Qatar) Muaither SC)
17	FW	UZB	Kamoliddin Murzoev (to (Kazakhstan) Irtysh Pavlodar)
20	FW	UZB	Anvarjon Soliev (to (Uzbekistan) Pakhtakor)
24	FW	UZB	Bahodir Pardaev (on loan to (Uzbekistan) FK Buxoro)

== Friendly matches ==
=== Pre-season ===
2013-01-09 Friendly	Al-Taawon (Saudi Arabia)	1 – 2	(Uzbekistan) Bunyodkor	Dubai
			Soliev; Pardaev

2013-01-09 Friendly	Metalist Kharkiv (Ukraine)	3 – 1	(Uzbekistan) Bunyodkor	Dubai
	Marlos 23', 68'; Willian Gomes 32'	Report	Soliev 28'

2013-01-26 Friendly	Al Sharjah (United Arab Emirates)	0 – 3	(Uzbekistan) Bunyodkor	Dubai
		Report	Pyschur; Soliev; Turaev

2013-01-31 Friendly	Spartak Moscow (Russia)	2 – 1	(Uzbekistan) Bunyodkor	Abu Dhabi
	Dzyuba 29'; Obukhov 61'	Report	Turaev 84'

2013-02-10 Friendly	Shakhter Karagandy (Kazakhstan)	1 – 1	(Uzbekistan) Bunyodkor	Antalya
			Turaev 33'

2013-02-13 Friendly	Jagiellonia Białystok (Poland)	1 – 1	(Uzbekistan) Bunyodkor	Antalya
			Turaev 7'

2013-02-13 Friendly	Tiraspol (Moldova)	0 – 4	(Uzbekistan) Bunyodkor	Antalya
			Gafurov 20'; Zoteev 38'; Salomov 70'; Murzoev 79'

2013-02-16 Friendly	Shakhtyor Soligorsk (Belarus)	2 – 4	(Uzbekistan) Bunyodkor	Antalya
	Vasilewski 34'; Pyatrow 63'		Pyschur 24', 82', 87'; Taran 58'

2013-02-16 Friendly	Chornomorets Odesa (Ukraine)	1 – 1	(Uzbekistan) Bunyodkor	Antalya
	Bakaj (yellow card) 45'; Bakaj 45+1'		Juraev (yellow card) 8'; Zoteev 90'

2013-02-19 Friendly	Vorskla Poltava (Ukraine)	2 – 1	(Uzbekistan) Bunyodkor	Antalya
	Hromov 25'; Budnik 29'		Rakhmatullaev 21'

=== Mid-season ===
2013-03-25 Friendly	Bunyodkor	2 – 1	Olmaliq FK	JAR Stadium, Tashkent
	Pardaev 82' (pen.); Gafurov 87'		Polvonov 75' (pen.)

== Competitions ==
Bunyodkor was present in all major competitions: Uzbek League, the AFC Champions League and the Uzbek Cup.

=== Uzbek League ===
==== Results summary ====
Overall								Home						Away					
Pld	W	D	L	GF	GA	GD	Pts	W	D	L	GF	GA	GD	W	D	L	GF	GA	GD
26	19	4	3	59	13	+46	61	11	1	1	37	5	+32	8	3	2	22	8	+14

Last updated: 8 November 2013.
Source: Soccerway

==== Results by round ====
Round	1	2	3	4	5	6	7	8	9	10	11	12	13	14	15	16	17	18	19	20	21	22	23	24	25	26
Ground	H	H	A	H	A	A	H	A	H	A	H	A	H	A	H	A	H	A	H	A	H	H	A	H	A	A
Result	W	W	W	W	L	W	W	W	W	W	W	W	D	D	L	W	W	D	W	D	W	W	W	W	L	W
Position	1	1	1	1	2	2	2	1	1	1	1	1	1	1	2	2	1	1	1	1	1	1	1	1	1	1

Source: Soccerway
A = Away; H = Home; W = Win; D = Draw; L = Loss

==== Results ====
4 March 2013 1	Bunyodkor	5 - 0	Sogdiana Jizzakh	Tashkent
14:00 UZT (UTC+5)	Pyschur 12' (pen.), 28' (pen.), 71'; Turaev 32'; Murzoev 86'	Summary	J.Kimsamov (red card) 12'	Stadium: JAR Stadium; Attendance: 764; Referee: Bakhtiyor Namazov

8 March 2013 2	Bunyodkor	3 - 0	Nasaf Qarshi	Tashkent
17:00 UZT (UTC+5)	Pyschur 15'; Musaev 29'; Rakhmatullaev 87'	Summary		Stadium: JAR Stadium; Attendance: 1,684; Referee: Vladislav Tseytlin

17 March 2013 3	Qizilqum Zarafshon	0 - 3	Bunyodkor	Zarafshon
16:00 UZT (UTC+5)		Summary	Zoteev 39', 87'; Taran 88'	Stadium: Progress Stadium; Attendance: 4,221; Referee: Marat Ismailov

29 March 2013 4	Bunyodkor	1 - 0	FK Guliston	Tashkent
17:00 UZT (UTC+5)	Murzoev 27'; Ibrokhimov (yellow card) 78'	Summary	Khayrov (yellow card) 84'	Stadium: JAR Stadium; Attendance: 3,465; Referee: Rustam Bobomuradov

14 April 2013 5	Olmaliq FK	3 - 1	Bunyodkor	Olmaliq
16:30 UZT (UTC+5)	Z.Polvonov 11'; Gogol 59', 70'	Summary	Murzoev 13' (pen.)	Stadium: Metallurg Stadium; Attendance: 5,785; Referee: Valentin Kovalenko

18 April 2013 6	FK Dinamo Samarqand	0 - 3	Bunyodkor	Samarqand
16:30 UZT (UTC+5)		Summary	Pyschur 18', 52'; Blažić 21'	Stadium: Olimpiya Stadium; Attendance: 5,743; Referee: Vladislav Tseytlin

5 May 2013 7	Bunyodkor	4 - 0	FK Buxoro	Tashkent
17:00 UZT (UTC+5)	Turaev 19'; Zoteev 21'; Pyschur 33', 45'	Summary		Stadium: JAR Stadium; Attendance: 3,162; Referee: Khasan Ruziev

9 May 2013 8	Navbahor Namangan	0 - 3	Bunyodkor	Kosonsoy
17:00 UZT (UTC+5)		Summary	K.Mukhamadjanov 32' (o.g.); Pyschur 72' (pen.); Turaev 89'	Stadium: Kosonsoy Stadium; Attendance: 10,265; Referee: Rustam Bobomuradov

26 May 2013 9	Bunyodkor	1 - 0	FC Shurtan Guzar	Tashkent
18:00 UZT (UTC+5)	Ibrokhimov 88'	Summary		Stadium: JAR Stadium; Attendance: 1,235; Referee: Aziz Asymov

31 May 2013 10	Neftchi Farg'ona	0 - 1	Bunyodkor	Farghona
17:00 UZT (UTC+5)		Summary	F.Turdialiev 64' (o.g.)	Stadium: Farghona Stadium; Attendance: 6,035; Referee: Valentin Kovalenko

21 June 2013 11	Bunyodkor	3 - 0	Metallurg Bekabad	Tashkent
18:00 UZT (UTC+5)	Zoteev 5'; Hasanov 40'; Pyschur 87'	Summary		Stadium: JAR Stadium; Attendance: 782; Referee: Zokir Kadyrov

30 June 2013 12	Pakhtakor	0 - 2	Bunyodkor	Tashkent
19:00 UZT (UTC+5)		Summary	Miladinović 67' (o.g.); Pyschur 75'	Stadium: Pakhtakor Stadium; Attendance: 3,941; Referee: Valentin Kovalenko

4 July 2013 13	Bunyodkor	1 - 1	Lokomotiv Tashkent	Tashkent
16:00 UZT (UTC+5)	Pyschur 45+1' (pen.)	Summary	F.Tadjiyev 83'	Stadium: JAR Stadium; Attendance: 4,152; Referee: Ravshan Irmatov

5 August 2013 14	Lokomotiv Tashkent	1 - 1	Bunyodkor	Tashkent
18:00 UZT (UTC+5)	Pyschur 41'	Summary	D.Jabborov 78'	Stadium: Lokomotiv Stadium; Attendance: 3,225; Referee: Valentin Kovalenko

10 August 2013 15	Bunyodkor	1 - 2	Pakhtakor	Tashkent
19:00 UZT (UTC+5)	Turaev 90'	Summary	Makharadze 4'; Abdukholiqov 83'	Stadium: JAR Stadium; Attendance: 5,362; Referee: Marat Ismailov

17 August 2013 16	Metallurg Bekabad	2 - 3	Bunyodkor	Bekabad
17:30 UZT (UTC+5)	S.Nurmаtov 8'; R.Vagapov 34'	Summary	Turaev 4', 74'; Pyschur 55'	Stadium: Metallurg Bekabad Stadium; Attendance: 4,265; Referee: Mamarasul Tukhtasinov

26 August 2013 17	Bunyodkor	1 - 0	Neftchi	Tashkent
19:00 UZT (UTC+5)	Hasanov 8' (pen.)	Summary		Stadium: Pakhtakor Markaziy Stadium; Attendance: 3,120; Referee: Rustam Bobomuradov

14 September 2013 18	Shurtan Guzar	0 - 0	Bunyodkor	G‘uzor
17:30 UZT (UTC+5)		Summary		Stadium: G'uzor Stadium; Attendance: 2,237; Referee: Aziz Asymov

20 September 2013 19	Bunyodkor	5 - 0	Navbahor Namangan	Tashkent
18:00 UZT (UTC+5)	S.Rashidov 2'; Berdiev 15'; Gafurov 63'; Taran 74', 89'	Summary		Stadium: Pakhtakor Markaziy Stadium; Attendance: 201; Referee: Sherzod Kasymov

29 September 2013 20	Buxoro	0 - 0	Bunyodkor	Bukhara
17:00 UZT (UTC+5)		Summary		Stadium: Buxoro Arena; Attendance: 10,150; Referee: Khasan Ruziev

5 October 2013 21	Bunyodkor	4 - 1	Samarqand-Dinamo	Tashkent
17:00 UZT (UTC+5)	Turaev 38'; Hasanov 45+2'; Pyschur 56' (pen.), 83'	Summary	F.Shotursunov 7'	Stadium: Pakhtakor Markaziy Stadium; Attendance: 1,162; Referee: Ilgiz Tantashev

18 October 2013 22	Bunyodkor	4 - 1	Olmaliq	Tashkent
17:00 UZT (UTC+5)	Zoteev 1'; Pyschur 25'; Berdiev 67', 80'	Summary	D.Abibullaev 11'	Stadium: Pakhtakor Markaziy Stadium; Attendance: 1,112; Referee: Valentin Kovalenko

23 October 2013 23	Guliston	1 - 3	Bunyodkor	Guliston
15:30 UZT (UTC+5)	M.Mamazulunov 87'	Summary	Berdiev 3'; Ibrokhimov 65'; Pyschur 81'	Stadium: Guliston Stadium; Attendance: 3,635; Referee: Vladislav Tseytlin

29 October 2013 24	Bunyodkor	4 - 0	Qizilqum Zarafshon	Tashkent
16:00 UZT (UTC+5)	Blažić 11', 17'; Rashidov 23'; Taran 76'	Summary		Stadium: Pakhtakor Markaziy Stadium; Attendance: 268; Referee: Marat Ismailov

3 November 2013 25	Nasaf Qarshi	1 - 0	Bunyodkor	Qarshi
14:00 UZT (UTC+5)	Gevorkyan 30' (pen.)	Summary	Karimov (yellow card) 59' (yellow-red card) 61'	Stadium: Markaziy Stadium; Attendance: 8,112; Referee: Valentin Kovalenko

8 November 2013 26	Sogdiana Jizzakh	0 - 2	Bunyodkor	Jizzakh
14:00 UZT (UTC+5)		Summary	Pyschur 7'; Rashidov 47'	Stadium: Markaziy Stadium; Attendance: 5,031; Referee: Olim Talibdjanov

==== League table ====
Pos	Team	Pld	W	D	L	GF	GA	GD	Pts	Qualification or relegation
1	Bunyodkor (C)	26	19	4	3	59	13	+46	61	2014 AFC Champions League Group stage (Note: Number of entrants per association for 2014 AFC Champions League can be changed.)
2	Lokomotiv Tashkent	26	19	3	4	63	21	+42	60	2014 AFC Champions League Play-off stage
3	Nasaf Qarshi	26	18	4	4	64	27	+37	58	2014 AFC Champions League Play-off stage
4	Pakhtakor Tashkent	26	17	3	6	45	25	+20	54	
5	Olmaliq FK	26	11	7	8	46	43	+3	40	

Updated to match(es) played on 8 November 2013. Source: Uzbekistan Professional Football League
Rules for classification: 1) points; 2) goal difference; 3) number of goals scored.
(C) Champions

=== Uzbek Cup ===
25 June 2013 Quarter-final 1st leg	Bunyodkor	1 - 1	Mash’al Mubarek	Tashkent
18:00 UZT (UTC+5)	Pardaev 40'	Summary	Abdumuminov 22'	Stadium: JAR Stadium; Attendance: 816; Referee: Vladislav Tseytlin

8 July 2013 Quarter-final 2nd leg	Mash’al Mubarek	0 - 2 (1 - 3 agg.)	Bunyodkor	Muborak
18:00 UZT (UTC+5)		Summary	Zoteev 37'; Pyschur 46'	Stadium: Bahrom Vafoev Stadium; Attendance: 1,055; Referee: Olim Talibdjanov

31 July 2013 Semi-final 1st leg	Bunyodkor	2 - 2	Lokomotiv Tashkent	Tashkent
19:00 UZT (UTC+5)	Taran 83'; Zoteev 84'	Summary	Kholmatov 11'; Abdullaev 20'	Stadium: JAR Stadium; Attendance: 4,675; Referee: Vladislav Tseytlin

21 August 2013 Semi-final 2nd leg	Lokomotiv Tashkent	0 - 2 (2 - 4 agg.)	Bunyodkor	Tashkent
17:00 UZT (UTC+5)		Summary	Pyschur 54', 65'	Stadium: Lokomotiv Stadium; Attendance: 1,995; Referee: Vladislav Tseytlin

25 September 2013 Final	Nasaf Qarshi	1 - 2	Bunyodkor	Tashkent
18:00 UZT (UTC+5)	I.Yunusov 63'	Summary	Pyschur 52', 85'	Stadium: Pakhtakor Markaziy Stadium; Attendance: 5,228; Referee: Ravshan Irmatov

=== AFC Champions League ===
==== Group stage ====
Pos	Team	Pld	W	D	L	GF	GA	GD	Pts	Qualification	BUN	BEI	POH	HIR
1	(Uzbekistan) Bunyodkor	6	2	4	0	6	3	+3	10	Advance to knockout stage	—	0–0	2–2	0–0
2	(China) Beijing Guoan	6	2	3	1	4	2	+2	9	Advance to knockout stage	0–1	—	2–0	2–1
3	(South Korea) Pohang Steelers	6	1	4	1	5	6	−1	7		1–1	0–0	—	1–1
4	(Japan) Sanfrecce Hiroshima	6	0	3	3	2	6	−4	3		0–2	0–0	0–1	—

27 February 2013 Group stage	Sanfrecce Hiroshima (Japan)	0 – 2	(Uzbekistan) Bunyodkor	Hiroshima, Japan
15:00 UTC+5		Report; Summary	Pyschur 45'; Musaev 86'	Stadium: Hiroshima Big Arch; Attendance: 6,607; Referee: Mohamed Al Zarooni (United Arab Emirates)

13 March 2013 Group stage	Bunyodkor (Uzbekistan)	2 – 2	(South Korea) Pohang Steelers	Tashkent, Uzbekistan
17:00 UTC+5	Pyschur 15'; Murzoev 90+4'	Report; Summary	Lee Myung-Joo 60'; Lee Kwang-Hoon 67'	Stadium: Bunyodkor Stadium, Tashkent; Attendance: 5,000; Referee: Alireza Faghani (Iran)

2 April 2013 Group stage	Bunyodkor (Uzbekistan)	0 – 0	(China) Beijing Guoan	Tashkent, Uzbekistan
17:00 UTC+5		Report		Stadium: Bunyodkor Stadium; Attendance: 7,520; Referee: Ali Abdulnabi (Bahrain)

10 April 2013 Group stage	Beijing Guoan (China)	0 – 1	(Uzbekistan) Bunyodkor	Beijing, China
13:30 UTC+5		Report	Musaev 32'	Stadium: Workers Stadium; Attendance: 37,811; Referee: Marai Al Awaji (Saudi Arabia)

23 April 2013 Group stage	Bunyodkor (Uzbekistan)	0 – 0	(Japan) Sanfrecce Hiroshima	Tashkent, Uzbekistan
18:00 UTC+5		Report		Stadium: Bunyodkor Stadium; Attendance: 8,448; Referee: Abdulla Hassan Mohamed (United Arab Emirates)

30 April 2013 Group stage	Pohang Steelers (South Korea)	1 – 1	(Uzbekistan) Bunyodkor	Pohang, South Korea
15:00 UTC+5	Park Sung-Ho 90+3'	Report	Pyschur 79'	Stadium: Pohang Steel Yard; Referee: Banjar Al-Dosari (Qatar)

==== Knockout stage ====
14 May 2013 Round of 16 1st Leg	Buriram United (Thailand)	2 – 1	(Uzbekistan) Bunyodkor	Buriram, Thailand
16:00 UZT (UTC+5)	Anawin 17'; Ekkachai 76'	Report	Taran 45+1'	Stadium: New I-Mobile Stadium; Attendance: 18,603; Referee: Ben Williams (Australia)

21 May 2013 Round of 16 2nd Leg	Bunyodkor (Uzbekistan)	0 – 0 (1 – 2 agg.)	(Thailand) Buriram United	Tashkent, Uzbekistan
19:00 UZT (UTC+5)		Report		Stadium: Bunyodkor Stadium; Attendance: 11,672; Referee: Abdullah Balideh (Qatar)

== Squad statistics ==
As of Match Played 8 November 2013

=== Appearances and goals ===
No.	Pos	Nat	Player	Total		Uzbek League		Uzbek Cup		AFC Champions League	
No.	Pos	Nat	Player	Apps	Goals	Apps	Goals	Apps	Goals	Apps	Goals
1	GK	(Uzbekistan) UZB	Ignatiy Nesterov	23	0	15+0	0	2+0	0	6+0	0
2	DF	(Uzbekistan) UZB	Akmal Shorakhmedov	31	0	21+0	0	4+0	0	6+0	0
3	DF	(Uzbekistan) UZB	Abduqahhor Hojiakbarov	2	0	0+2	0	0+0	0	0+0	0
4	DF	(Uzbekistan) UZB	Hayrulla Karimov	35	0	24+0	0	4+0	0	7+0	0
5	DF	(Uzbekistan) UZB	Dilshod Juraev	22	0	11+7	0	0+1	0	1+2	0
6	DF	(Uzbekistan) UZB	Anvar Gafurov	32	1	22+1	1	2+1	0	5+1	0
7	MF	(Serbia) SRB	Marko Blažić	32	3	19+1	3	2+2	0	8+0	0
8	MF	(Uzbekistan) UZB	Jovlon Ibrokhimov	35	2	24+0	2	4+0	0	7+0	0
9	FW	(Uzbekistan) UZB	Igor Taran	25	6	8+10	4	2+2	1	2+1	1
11	FW	(Ukraine) UKR	Oleksandr Pyschur	38	27	21+4	19	5+0	5	7+1	3
13	MF	(Uzbekistan) UZB	Lutfulla Turaev	36	7	19+5	7	4+0	0	8+0	0
14	MF	(Uzbekistan) UZB	Alibobo Rakhmatullaev	22	2	1+12	1	0+2	0	0+7	1
16	DF	(Uzbekistan) UZB	Artyom Filiposyan	30	0	18+1	0	3+0	0	8+0	0
19	MF	(Uzbekistan) UZB	Jasur Hasanov	29	3	19+1	3	3+0	0	6+0	0
21	FW	(Uzbekistan) UZB	Sardor Rashidov	20	3	6+8	3	1+2	0	0+3	0
23	DF	(Uzbekistan) UZB	Sakhob Juraev	23	0	15+1	0	3+0	0	4+0	0
25	GK	(Uzbekistan) UZB	Murod Zukhurov	16	0	11+1	0	2+0	0	2+0	0
27	MF	(Uzbekistan) UZB	Sardor Sabirkhodjaev	1	0	0+1	0	0+0	0	0+0	0
29	FW	(Uzbekistan) UZB	Anvar Berdiev	9	4	3+5	4	1+0	0	0+0	0
33	MF	(Uzbekistan) UZB	Oleg Zoteev	30	7	17+3	5	2+1	2	4+3	0
Players who left Bunyodkor during the season:
18	MF	(Uzbekistan) UZB	Fozil Musaev	18	3	8+4	1	0+1	0	5+0	2
17	FW	(Uzbekistan) UZB	Kamoliddin Murzoev	15	3	4+4	3	0+0	0	2+5	0
24	FW	(Uzbekistan) UZB	Bahodir Pardaev	4	1	0+3	0	1+0	1	0+0	0

=== Goal scorers ===
Place	Position	Nation	Number	Name	Uzbek League	Uzbekistan Cup	AFC Champions League	Total
1	FW	(Ukraine)	11	Oleksandr Pyschur	19	5	3	27
2	MF	(Uzbekistan)	13	Lutfulla Turaev	7	0	0	7
2	MF	(Uzbekistan)	33	Oleg Zoteev	5	2	0	7
4	FW	(Uzbekistan)	9	Igor Taran	4	1	1	6
5	FW	(Uzbekistan)	29	Anvar Berdiev	4	0	0	4
5	FW	(Uzbekistan)	17	Kamoliddin Murzoev	3	0	1	4
7	MF	(Uzbekistan)	19	Jasur Hasanov	3	0	0	3
7	MF	(Serbia)	7	Marko Blažić	3	0	0	3
7	FW	(Uzbekistan)	21	Sardor Rashidov	3	0	0	3
7				Own goal	3	0	0	3
7	MF	(Uzbekistan)	18	Fozil Musaev	1	0	2	3
11	MF	(Uzbekistan)	8	Jovlon Ibrokhimov	2	0	0	2
12	MF	(Uzbekistan)	14	Alibobo Rakhmatullaev	1	0	0	1
12	DF	(Uzbekistan)	6	Anvar Gafurov	1	0	0	1
12	FW	(Uzbekistan)	24	Bahodir Pardaev	0	1	0	1
				TOTALS	59	9	7	75

=== Disciplinary record ===
Number	Nation	Position	Name	Uzbek League		Uzbekistan Cup		AFC Champions League		Total	
Number	Nation	Position	Name	Yellow card	Red card	Yellow card	Red card	Yellow card	Red card	Yellow card	Red card
2	(Uzbekistan)	DF	Akmal Shorakhmedov	3	0	0	0	2	0	5	0
4	(Uzbekistan)	DF	Hayrulla Karimov	8	1	3	0	3	0	14	1
5	(Uzbekistan)	DF	Dilshod Juraev	3	0	0	0	1	0	4	0
6	(Uzbekistan)	DF	Anvar Gafurov	3	0	1	0	0	0	4	0
7	(Serbia)	MF	Marko Blažić	3	0	0	0	0	0	3	0
6	(Uzbekistan)	DF	Anvar Gafurov	3	0	0	0	0	0	3	0
8	(Uzbekistan)	DF	Jovlon Ibrokhimov	3	0	3	0	0	0	6	0
9	(Uzbekistan)	FW	Igor Taran	0	0	0	0	1	0	1	0
11	(Ukraine)	FW	Oleksandr Pyschur	3	0	0	0	0	0	3	0
13	(Uzbekistan)	MF	Lutfulla Turaev	5	0	1	0	1	0	7	0
14	(Uzbekistan)	MF	Alibobo Rakhmatullaev	1	0	0	0	0	0	1	0
16	(Uzbekistan)	DF	Artyom Filiposyan	4	0	1	0	1	0	6	0
17	(Uzbekistan)	FW	Kamoliddin Murzoev	0	0	0	0	1	0	1	0
18	(Uzbekistan)	MF	Fozil Musaev	2	0	0	0	1	0	3	0
19	(Uzbekistan)	MF	Jasur Hasanov	2	0	0	0	0	0	2	0
21	(Uzbekistan)	FW	Sardor Rashidov	1	0	0	0	0	0	1	0
23	(Uzbekistan)	DF	Sakhob Juraev	1	0	1	0	0	0	2	0
33	(Uzbekistan)	MF	Oleg Zoteev	1	0	0	0	1	0	2	0
			TOTALS	43	0	8	0	12	0	63	0
