= Akmal Shorakhmedov =

Uzbekistani footballer

Personal information
- Full name: Akmal Shorakhmedov
- Date of birth: 10 May 1986 (age 40)
- Place of birth: Tashkent, Uzbek SSR, Soviet Union
- Height: 1.81 m (5 ft 11 1/2 in)
- Position: Right back

Team information
- Current team: AGMK
- Number: 23

Senior career*
Years	Team	Apps	(Gls)
2005–2006	Sogdiana Jizzakh	51	(1)
2007	Navbahor	16	(0)
2008	Sogdiana Jizzakh	30	(3)
2009–2010	Andijan	53	(0)
2011–2017	Bunyodkor	168	(7)
2018	Pakhtakor	27	(0)
2019–	AGMK	35	(0)

International career^{‡}
2010–	Uzbekistan	34	(0)
- * Club domestic league appearances and goals as of 26 October 2020 ‡ National team caps and goals as of 21:14, 9 May 2019 (UTC)

Akmal Shorahmedov (Uzbek: Akmal Shorahmedov), (born 10 May 1986) is an Uzbekistani professional footballer who plays as a right back for FC AGMK.

== Career ==
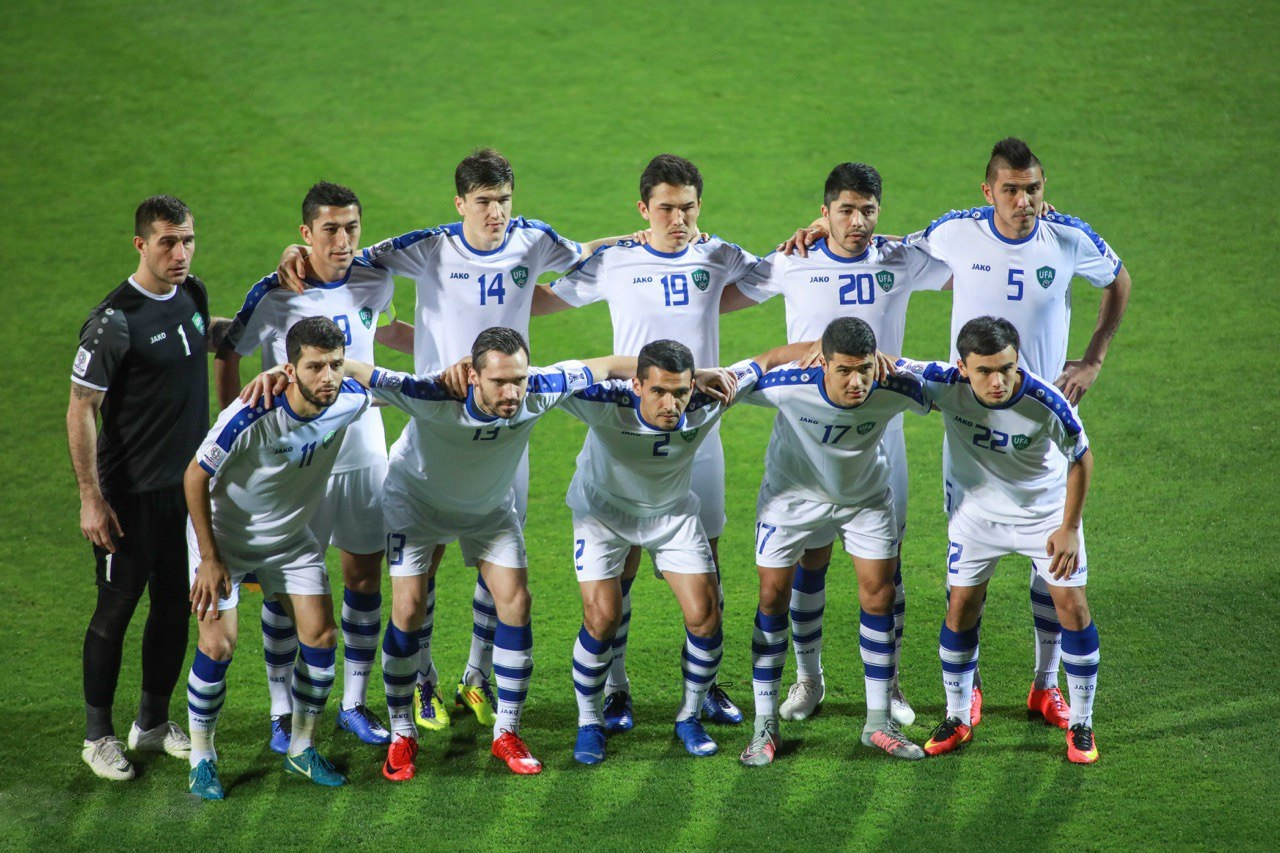
Shorakhmedov (№2) at 2019 Asian Cup

On 24 February 2011, Bunyodkor's site announced Akmal Shorahmedov as a player for Season 2011.

== Career statistics ==
=== Club ===
As of match played 1 March 2016

Appearances and goals by club, season and competition
Club	Season	League			National Cup		Continental		Supercup		Total	
Club	Season	Division	Apps	Goals	Apps	Goals	Apps	Goals	Apps	Goals	Apps	Goals
Bunyodkor	2011	Uzbek League	20	1	5	0	1	0	-		26	1
Bunyodkor	2012	Uzbek League	22	2	7	1	8	1	-		36	4
Bunyodkor	2013	Uzbek League	21	0	4	0	6	0	-		31	0
Bunyodkor	2014	Uzbek League	21	1	5	0	8	0	1	0	35	1
Bunyodkor	2015	Uzbek League	27	1	6	0	6	0	-		39	1
Bunyodkor	2016	Uzbek League	0	0	0	0	3	0	-		3	0
Bunyodkor	Total		111	5	27	1	32	1	1	0	171	7
Career total			111	5	27	1	32	1	1	0	171	7

=== International ===
Uzbekistan national team
Year	Apps	Goals
2010	1	0
2011	0	0
2012	5	0
2013	7	0
2014	3	0
2015	6	0
2016	0	0
2017	3	0
2018	1	0
Total	27	0

Statistics accurate as of match played 23 March 2018

== Honours ==
Bunyodkor

- Uzbek League (2): 2011, 2013
- Uzbek League runners-up (1): 2012
- Uzbek Cup (2): 2012, 2013
- Uzbekistan Super Cup (1): 2014
