= Chaker Zouaghi =

Tunisian footballer (born 1985)

Personal information
- Date of birth: 10 January 1985 (age 41)
- Place of birth: Béja, Tunisia
- Height: 1.91 m (6 ft 3 in)
- Positions: Defensive midfielder; centre-back

Youth career
- –1999: Olympique Béja
- 1999–2001: Étoile du Sahel

Senior career*
Years	Team	Apps	(Gls)
2001–2006	Étoile du Sahel	?	(?)
2006–2009	Lokomotiv Moscow	12	(1)
2009–2010	Étoile du Sahel	19	(0)
2010–2012	FC Zürich	41	(3)
2012–2013	Espérance de Tunis	10	(1)
2014	Olmaliq FK	22	(4)
2015–2016	Bunyodkor	37	(8)
2016–2017	Al Khaleej	21	(4)
Total		162	(21)

International career
2005–2008	Tunisia	14	(1)

Managerial career
- 2019: AS Gabès (assistant)
- 2022: Étoile du Sahel (caretaker)
- * Club domestic league appearances and goals

Chaker Zouaghi (born 10 January 1985) is a Tunisian professional football coach and a former defensive midfielder. He is a brother of Kaies Zouaghi, and was assistant manager under him as AS Gabès.

== Club career ==
Zouaghi was born in Béja. He began his career at Étoile du Sahel before moving to FC Lokomotiv Moscow in early 2006. He played in Russia for three years, before having his contract mutually terminated in March 2009. In January 2010, Zouaghi signed a three-year contract with FC Zürich, to begin in July 2010.

In January 2014 Zouaghi was linked with a move to Iraqi Premier League side Duhok SC,

In December 2014, Zouaghi signed for FC Bunyodkor. On 1 August 2016, Zouaghi moved to UAE Division 1 side Al Khaleej.

== International career ==
Zouaghi made his debut for Tunisia in November 2005.

== Career statistics ==
=== Club ===
Appearances and goals by club, season and competition
Club	Season	League			National cup		Continental		Other		Total	
Club	Season	Division	Apps	Goals	Apps	Goals	Apps	Goals	Apps	Goals	Apps	Goals
Étoile du Sahel	2004–05	Tunisian Ligue Professionnelle 1			0	0	3 (Note: Appearances in CAF Champions League)	0	—		3	0
Étoile du Sahel	2005–06	Tunisian Ligue Professionnelle 1			0	0	7	0	—		7	0
Étoile du Sahel	Total				0	0	10	0	—		10	0
Lokomotiv Moscow	2006	Russian Premier League	11	1	1	0	—		—		12	1
Lokomotiv Moscow	2007	Russian Premier League	1	0	1	0	—		—		2	0
Lokomotiv Moscow	2008	Russian Premier League	0	0	1	0	—		—		1	0
Lokomotiv Moscow	Total		12	1	3	0	—		—		15	1
Étoile du Sahel	2009–10	Tunisian Ligue Professionnelle 1	19	0	0	0	3	0	—		22	0
FC Zürich	2010–11	Swiss Super League	29	3	2	0	—		—		31	3
FC Zürich	2011–12	Swiss Super League	12	0	2	0	4 (Note: Appearances in UEFA Europa League)	0	—		18	0
FC Zürich	Total		41	3	4	0	4	0	—		49	3
Espérance de Tunis	2011–12	Tunisian Ligue Professionnelle 1	5	1	0	0	6	0	—		11	1
Espérance de Tunis	2012–13	Tunisian Ligue Professionnelle 1	5	0	0	0	—		—		5	0
Espérance de Tunis	Total		10	1	0	0	6	0	—		16	1
Olmaliq	2014	Uzbek League	22	4	3	0	—		—		25	4
Bunyodkor	2015	Uzbek League	25	7	5	0	6 (Note: Appearances in AFC Champions League)	0	—		36	7
Bunyodkor	2016	Uzbek League	12	1	2	0	6	2	—		20	3
Bunyodkor	Total		37	8	7	0	12	2	—		56	10
Al Khaleej	2016–17	UAE Division 1	21	4	0	0	—		0	0	21	4
Career total			162	21	17	0	35	2	0	0	214	19

=== International ===
Appearances and goals by national team and year
National team	Year	Apps	Goals
Tunisia	2006	4	1
Tunisia	2007	4	0
Tunisia	2008	6	0
Total		14	1

== Honours ==
Étoile du Sahel

- Coupe de la Ligue Professionelle: 2005
- African Cup Winners' Cup: 2003

Lokomotiv Moscow

- Russian Cup: 2007
