= 2016 Uzbekistan Cup =

O'zbekiston Kubogi 2016
Tournament details
- Country: Uzbekistan

Final positions
- Champions: Lokomotiv Tashkent
- Runners-up: Nasaf Qarshi

The 2016 Uzbekistan Cup was the 24th season of the annual Uzbek football Cup competition. The competition started on 14 March 2016 and ended in November 2016. The cup winner is guaranteed a place in the 2017 AFC Champions League.

== Matches ==
=== First Round ===
| 14 March 2016 | Pakhtakor-2 | 1–0 | Lokomotiv BFK Tashkent |

| 14 March 2016 | FK Orol Nukus | 2–1 | Xorazm FK Urganch |

| 14 March 2016 | Nurafshon Bukhara | 2–1 | FK Gijduvan |

| 14 March 2016 | Nasaf-2 | 1–1 (a.e.t.) (1–3 p) | Mashʼal-2 |

| 14 March 2016 | Hotira Namangan | ann | FK Kosonsoy |

| 14 March 2016 | FK Yozyovon | 2–0 | FK Naryn |

=== Second round ===
| 18 March 2016 | Hotira Namangan | 0–3 | PFK Metallurg Bekabad |

| 18 March 2016 | Nurafshon Bukhara | 0–2 (a.e.t.) | Olmaliq FK |

| 18 March 2016 | NBU Osiyo | 2–3 (a.e.t.) | Kokand 1912 |

| 19 March 2016 | Uz-Dong-Ju | 1–0 | Shurtan |

| 19 March 2016 | Oqtepa | 0–5 | Obod Tashkent |

| 19 March 2016 | Sementchi | 2–3 | Navbahor Namangan |

| 19 March 2016 | Mashʼal-2 | 0–0 (a.e.t.) (7–8 p) | Mash'al Mubarek |

| 19 March 2016 | Qizilqum Zarafshon | 5–0 | FK Orol Nukus |

| 19 March 2016 | FK Zaamin | 0–2 | Andijan |

| 20 March 2016 | Pakhtakor-2 | 1–2 | Sogdiana Jizzakh |

| 20 March 2016 | FK Yozyovon | 0–4 | FK Buxoro |

| 20 March 2016 | Dinamo Samarqand | 0–1 | Neftchi Fergana |

=== Third round ===
==== 1st Legs ====
| 25 March 2016 | Uz-Dong-Ju | 1–4 | Lokomotiv Tashkent |

| 25 March 2016 | Navbahor Namangan | 0–1 | Kokand 1912 |

| 25 March 2016 | Metallurg Bekabad | 1–0 | Olmaliq |

| 25 March 2016 | Mash'al Mubarek | 1–1 | Sogdiana Jizzakh |

| 25 March 2016 | Qizilqum Zarafshon | 2–2 | Andijan |

| 26 March 2016 | Obod Tashkent | 2–2 | Bunyodkor |

| 26 March 2016 | Neftchi Fergana | 1–4 | Nasaf Qarshi |

| 18 May 2016 | Pakhtakor Tashkent | 0–1 | Buxoro |

==== 2nd Legs ====
| 21 May 2016 | Kokand 1912 | 1–1 | Navbahor Namangan |

Kokand advance 2–1 on aggregate

| 21 May 2016 | Olmaliq | 2–3 | Metallurg Bekabad |

Metallurg Bekabad advance 4–2 on aggregate

| 21 May 2016 | Sogdiana Jizzakh | 0–1 | Mash'al Mubarek |

Mash'al Mubarek advance 2–1 on aggregate

| 21 May 2016 | Andijan | 3–1 | Qizilqum Zarafshon |

Andijan advance 5–3 on aggregate

| 21 May 2016 | Bunyodkor | 2–1 | Obod Tashkent |

Bunyodkor advance 4–3 on aggregate

| 21 May 2016 | Nasaf Qarshi | 1–0 | Neftchi Fergana |

Nasaf advance 5–1 on aggregate

| 22 May 2016 | Bukhoro | 1–0 | Pakhtakor Tashkent |

Bukhoro advance 2–0 on aggregate

| 8 June 2016 | Lokomotiv Tashkent | 9–0 | Uz-Dong-Ju |

Lokomotiv Tashkent advance 13–1 on aggregate

=== Quarter-finals ===
==== 1st Legs ====
| 5 July 2016 | Kokand 1912 | 1–1 | Bukhoro |

| 5 July 2016 | Andijan | 0–2 | Nasaf Qarshi |

| 5 July 2016 | Mash'al Mubarek | 1–4 | Lokomotiv Tashkent |

| 29 July 2016 | Metallurg Bekabad | 1–3 | Bunyodkor |

==== 2nd Legs ====
| 28 July 2016 | Bukhoro | 2–0 | Kokand 1912 |

FK Buxoro advance 3–1 on aggregate

| 29 July 2016 | Nasaf Qarshi | 2–1 | Andijan |

Nasaf Qarshi advance 4–1 on aggregate

| 25 July 2016 | Lokomotiv Tashkent | 1–2 | Mash'al Mubarek |

Lokomotiv Tashkent advance 5–3 on aggregate

| 21 September 2016 | Bunyodkor | 0–0 | Metallurg Bekabad |

Bunyodkor advance 3–1 on aggregate

=== Semi-finals ===
==== First legs ====
| 25 August 2016 | Nasaf Qarshi | 2–0 | Bukhoro |

| 25 October 2016 | Lokomotiv Tashkent | 1–0 | Bunyodkor |

==== Secost legs ====
| 21 September 2016 | Bukhoro | 1–2 | Nasaf Qarshi |

Nasaf Qarshi advance 4–1 on aggregate

| 26 November 2016 | Bunyodkor | 0–1 | Lokomotiv Tashkent |

Lokomotiv Tashkent advance 2–0 on aggregate

=== Final ===
| 30 November 2016 | Lokomotiv Tashkent | 1–0 | Nasaf Qarshi |
