= Akramjon Komilov =

Uzbekistani footballer

Personal information
- Full name: Akramjon Komilov
- Date of birth: 14 March 1996 (age 30)
- Place of birth: Kokand, Uzbekistan
- Height: 1.75 m (5 ft 9 in)
- Position: Defender

Team information
- Current team: FC Nasaf
- Number: 4

Senior career*
Years	Team	Apps	(Gls)
2014–2018	Bunyodkor	111	(3)
2019–2021	Pakhtakor Tashkent	24	(2)
2021-2025	FC AGMK	90	(1)
2026-	FC Nasaf	8	(0)

International career^{‡}
2013	Uzbekistan U17	4	(0)
2014	Uzbekistan U19	3	(0)
2014–2015	Uzbekistan U20	5	(0)
2015–2018	Uzbekistan U23	8	(1)
2016–	Uzbekistan	8	(0)
Medal record
Representing Uzbekistan
Men's football
AFC U-16 Championship
Gold medal – first place	2012 Iran	Team
AFC U-19 Championship
Bronze medal – third place	2014 Myanmar	Team
AFC U-23 Championship
Gold medal – first place	2018 China	Team
- * Club domestic league appearances and goals as of 29 July 2026 ‡ National team caps and goals as of 18:59, 11 June 2020 (UTC)

Akramjon Komilov (born 14 March 1996 in Kokand, Uzbekistan) is an Uzbekistani footballer who currently plays for FC Nasaf.

== Career statistics ==
=== Club ===
As of match played 29 June 2019

Club	Season	League			National Cup		Continental		Other		Total	
Club	Season	Division	Apps	Goals	Apps	Goals	Apps	Goals	Apps	Goals	Apps	Goals
Bunyodkor	2014	Uzbekistan Super League	9	1	4	0	0	0	0	0	13	1
Bunyodkor	2015	Uzbekistan Super League	15	0	5	1	4	0	0	0	24	1
Bunyodkor	2016	Uzbekistan Super League	29	0	5	0	7	0	0	0	41	0
Bunyodkor	2017	Uzbekistan Super League	29	2	7	0	6	1	-		42	3
Bunyodkor	2018	Uzbekistan Super League	29	0	3	0	-		-		4	0
Bunyodkor	Total		111	3	24	1	17	1	0	0	152	5
Pakhtakor Tashkent	2019	Uzbekistan Super League	9	0	0	0	1	0	0	0	10	0
Pakhtakor Tashkent	2020	Uzbekistan Super League	0	0	0	0	0	0	0	0	0	0
Pakhtakor Tashkent	Total		9	0	0	0	1	0	0	0	10	0
Career total			120	3	24	1	18	1	0	0	162	5

=== International ===
Uzbekistan national team
Year	Apps	Goals
2016	2	0
2017	1	0
2018	4	0
Total	7	0

Statistics accurate as of match played 7 June 2018

== Honours ==
=== Club ===
Bunyodkor

- Uzbekistan Super Cup: 2014

=== International ===
Uzbekistan U-23

- AFC U-23 Championship (1): 2018

Uzbekistan U-16

- AFC U-16 Championship (1): 2012
