= Otabek Shukurov =

Uzbek footballer

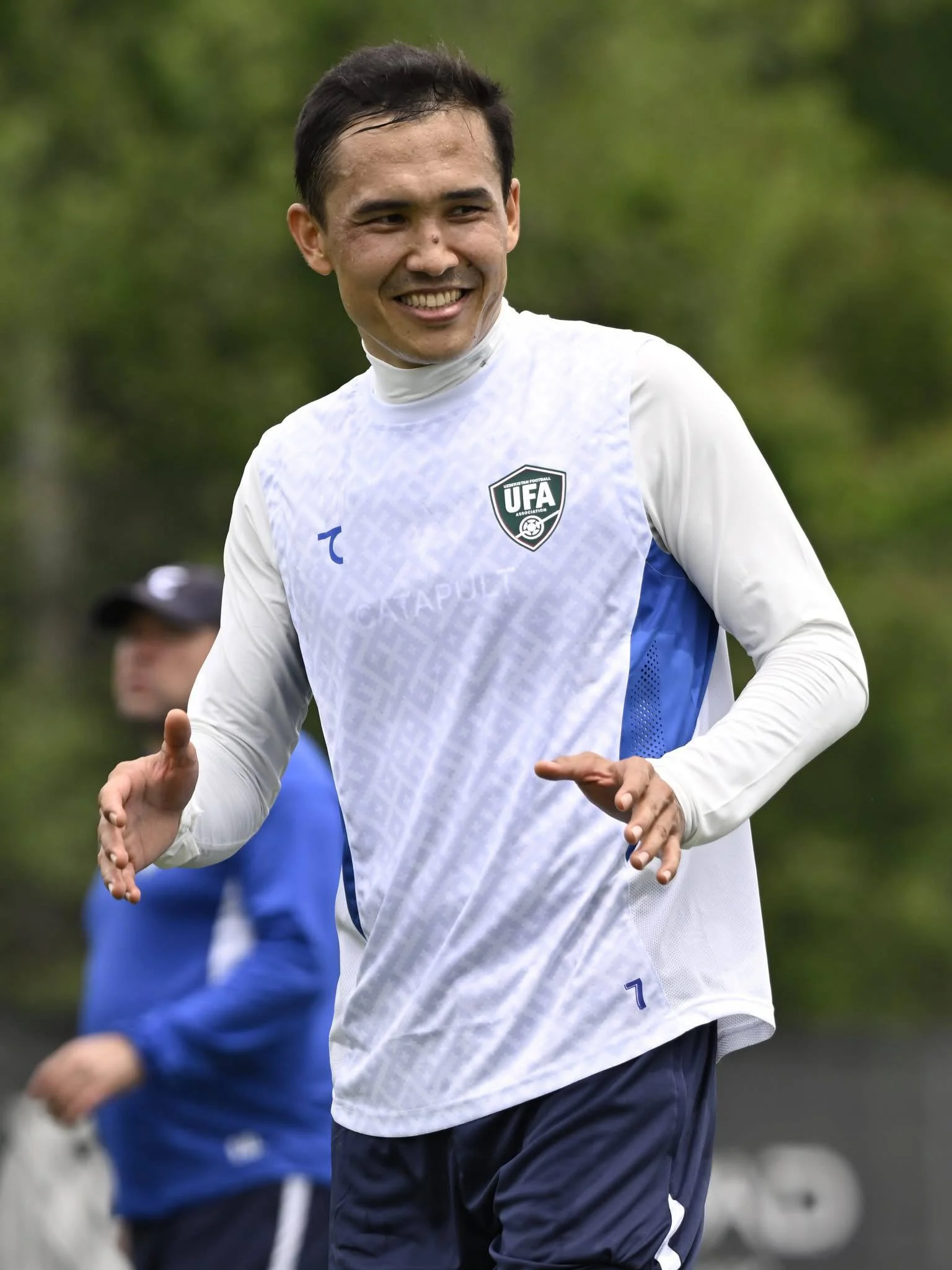
- Shukurov in 2024

Personal information
- Full name: Otabek Gʻayrat oʻgʻli Shukurov
- Date of birth: 22 June 1996 (age 30)
- Place of birth: Chiroqchi, Uzbekistan
- Height: 1.82 m (6 ft 0 in)
- Position: Midfielder

Team information
- Current team: Radnik Surdulica
- Number: 29

Senior career*
Years	Team	Apps	(Gls)
2014	Mash'al Mubarek	4	(0)
2015	Bunyodkor	2	(0)
2015	Buxoro	14	(2)
2016–2018	Bunyodkor	53	(5)
2018–2022	Sharjah	95	(10)
2022–2023	Fatih Karagümrük	43	(1)
2024	Kayserispor	12	(0)
2024–2025	Al Fayha	28	(0)
2025–2026	Baniyas	19	(0)
2026–	Radnik Surdulica	2	(0)

International career^{‡}
2013	Uzbekistan U17	4	(0)
2015	Uzbekistan U20	5	(0)
2016	Uzbekistan U23	3	(0)
2016–	Uzbekistan	91	(10)
Medal record
Men's football
Representing Uzbekistan
FIFA Series
Winner	2026 Uzbekistan
CAFA Nations Cup
Runner-up	2023 Kyrgyzstan–Uzbekistan	Team
Winner	2025 Tajikistan–Uzbekistan	Team
AFC U-16 Championship
Gold medal – first place	2012 Iran	Team
AFC U-19 Championship
Bronze medal – third place	2014 Myanmar	Team
AFC U-23 Championship
Gold medal – first place	2018 China	Team
- * Club domestic league appearances and goals as of 17 October 2026 ‡ National team caps and goals as of 28 June 2026

Otabek Shukurov (born 22 June 1996) is an Uzbek professional footballer who plays as a midfielder for Radnik Surdulica and the Uzbekistan national team.

== Club career ==
Shukurov joined Mash'al Mubarek in 2014 and made his league debut against PFK Metallurg Bekabad on 21 June 2014. On 1 January 2015, he moved to FC Bunyodkor where he played two league games before transferring to FK Buxoro on 15 July 2015. He had successful season in FK Buxoro by playing 14 games and scoring 2 goals and returned to FC Bunyodkor on 1 January 2016.

On 6 February 2024, it was announced that they had reached an agreement with the Turkish team Kayserispor and the agreement was signed on 9 February 2024.

The 28-year-old player moved from Kayserispor of Turkey to Al Fayha of Saudi Arabia in September 2024.

On 3 October 2025, Shukurov joined UAE Pro League club Baniyas.

On 2 October, Shukurov signed with Serbian club Radnik Surdulica as a free agent. Following the completion of his paperwork, the club announced they plan to utilize his experience in the central midfield to help organize the team's attacks.

== International career ==
Shukurov in action for Uzbekistan national football team in 2025 against Iran

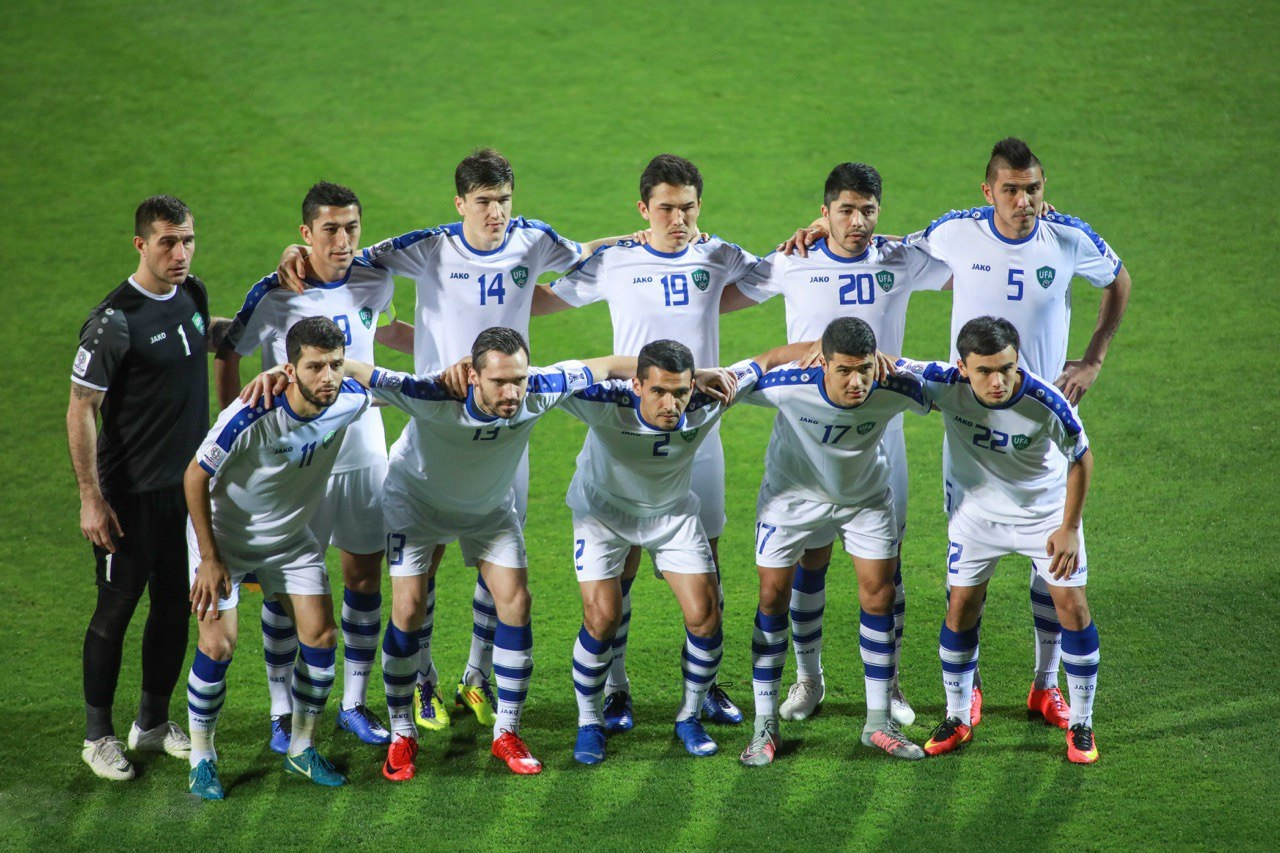
Otabek Shukurov (№19) at 2019 Asian Cup

Shukurov has represented his country at various age groups. He made his Uzbekistan national team debut against Lebanon on 14 February 2016. In that match, Uzbekistan won by a score of 2–0.

Shukurov scored his first international goal on 11 October 2016 in a World Cup qualifying match against China.

He took part in the Uzbekistan squad for FIFA World Cup 2026.

== Career statistics ==
=== Club ===
As of match played 12 February 2024

Appearances and goals by club, season and competition
Club	Season	League			National cup		Continental		Other		Total	
Club	Season	Division	Apps	Goals	Apps	Goals	Apps	Goals	Apps	Goals	Apps	Goals
Mash'al Mubarek	2014	Uzbekistan Super League	4	0	3	0	–		–		7	0
Bunyodkor	2015	Uzbekistan Super League	2	0	2	0	0	0	–		4	0
Buxoro	2015	Uzbekistan Super League	14	2	0	0	–		–		14	2
Bunyodkor	2016	Uzbekistan Super League	25	0	6	0	7	0	–		38	0
Bunyodkor	2017	Uzbekistan Super League	28	5	7	2	7	0	–		42	7
Bunyodkor	Total		73	7	18	2	14	0	–		105	9
Sharjah	2017–18	UAE Pro League	11	0	0	0	–		–		11	0
Sharjah	2018–19	UAE Pro League	17	2	0	0	–		–		17	2
Sharjah	2019–20	UAE Pro League	19	3	3	0	5	0	1	0	28	3
Sharjah	2020–21	UAE Pro League	24	1	1	0	7	0	1	0	33	1
Sharjah	2021–22	UAE Pro League	24	4	3	1	6	1	–		33	6
Sharjah	Total		95	10	7	1	18	1	2	0	122	12
Fatih Karagümrük	2022–23	Süper Lig	28	1	3	0	–		–		31	1
Fatih Karagümrük	2023–24	Süper Lig	15	0	0	0	–		–		15	0
Fatih Karagümrük	Total		43	1	3	0	–		–		46	1
Kayserispor	2023–24	Süper Lig	12	0	0	0	–		–		12	0
Al Fayha	2024–25	Saudi Pro League	0	0	0	0	–		–		0	0
Career total			223	18	28	3	32	1	2	0	285	22

=== International ===
As of match played 27 June 2026

Appearances and goals by national team and year
National team	Year	Apps	Goals
Uzbekistan	2016	10	1
Uzbekistan	2017	5	0
Uzbekistan	2018	7	1
Uzbekistan	2019	9	1
Uzbekistan	2020	2	0
Uzbekistan	2021	8	1
Uzbekistan	2022	10	0
Uzbekistan	2023	10	4
Uzbekistan	2024	13	1
Uzbekistan	2025	10	1
Uzbekistan	2026	7	0
Total		91	10

Scores and results list Uzbekistan's goal tally first.

List of international goals scored by Otabek Shukurov
No.	Date	Venue	Opponent	Score	Result	Competition
1.	11 October 2016	Bunyodkor Stadium, Tashkent, Uzbekistan	China	2–0	2–0	2018 FIFA World Cup qualification
2.	23 March 2018	Stade Mohamed V, Casablanca, Morocco	Senegal	1–0	1–1	Friendly
3.	14 November 2019	Pakhtakor Stadium, Tashkent, Uzbekistan	Saudi Arabia	2–1	2–3	2022 FIFA World Cup qualification
4.	26 March 2021	Markaziy Stadium, Namangan, Uzbekistan	Ghana	1–0	2–1	Friendly
5.	12 September 2023	Mercedes-Benz Stadium, Atlanta, United States	Mexico	3–3	3–3	Friendly
6.	16 October 2023	Dalian Sports Centre Stadium, Dalian, China	China	1–1	2–1	Friendly
7.	16 November 2023	Ashgabat Stadium, Ashgabat, Turkmenistan	Turkmenistan	1–1	3–1	2026 FIFA World Cup qualification
8.	16 November 2023	Ashgabat Stadium, Ashgabat, Turkmenistan	Turkmenistan	2–1	3–1	2026 FIFA World Cup qualification
9.	15 October 2024	Bunyodkor Stadium, Tashkent, Uzbekistan	United Arab Emirates	1–0	1–0	2026 FIFA World Cup qualification
10.	5 September 2025	Olympic City Stadium, Tashkent, Uzbekistan	Kyrgyzstan	2–0	4–0	2025 CAFA Nations Cup

== Achievements ==
- Oʻzbekiston iftixori (June 6, 2025) — for a great contribution to the development and wide popularization of sports in our country, the promotion of a healthy lifestyle in society, the display of true courage and resilience, an example of high professionalism and dedication in the qualifying tournaments among the strongest football teams in Asia, and securing qualification for the World Cup for the first time in the history of our Motherland, which became a great victory, active participation in enhancing the glory of New Uzbekistan on a global scale, and educating the younger generation in the spirit of love for the Motherland, national pride, and patriotism
