= Zabikhillo Urinboev =

Uzbekistani footballer

Personal information
- Full name: Zabikhillo Urinboev
- Date of birth: 30 March 1995 (age 31)
- Place of birth: Tashkent, Uzbekistan
- Height: 1.82 m (6 ft 0 in)
- Position: Forward

Team information
- Current team: Sogdiana
- Number: 19

Youth career
- Mash'al Mubarek
- Bunyodkor

Senior career*
Years	Team	Apps	(Gls)
2014–2016	Bunyodkor	49	(4)
2017	Olmaliq	11	(1)
2017	Pakhtakor	2	(0)
2018–2019	Metallurg Bekabad	24	(2)
2019	Tokushima Vortis	0	(0)
2020–2022	Navbahor Namangan	45	(3)
2022–2024	PFK Metallurg Bekabad	61	(13)
2025–2026	Navbahor Namangan	30	(8)
2026–	Sogdiana	2	(0)

International career
2011–2013	Uzbekistan U-17	30	(14)
2014–2017	Uzbekistan U-20	1	(1)
2017–2018	Uzbekistan U-23	26	(12)
2018–	Uzbekistan	2	(0)
Medal record
Representing Uzbekistan
Men's football
Winner	China 2018	Team
- * Club domestic league appearances and goals as of 29 July 2026

Zabikhillo Urinboev (born 30 March 1995) is an Uzbekistani footballer who plays as a forward. He currently plays for Sogdiana.

He made his debut for the Uzbekistan national football team in May 2018 against Iran in a friendly. He has also played for Uzbekistani youth teams in international tournaments such as the 2011 FIFA U-17 World Cup, the 2013 FIFA U-20 World Cup, the 2015 FIFA U-20 World Cup, and the 2018 AFC U-23 Championship, which he won.

== Honours ==
Uzbekistan U-23

- AFC U-23 Championship: 2018
