= Rustam Ashurmatov =

Uzbek footballer (born 1996)

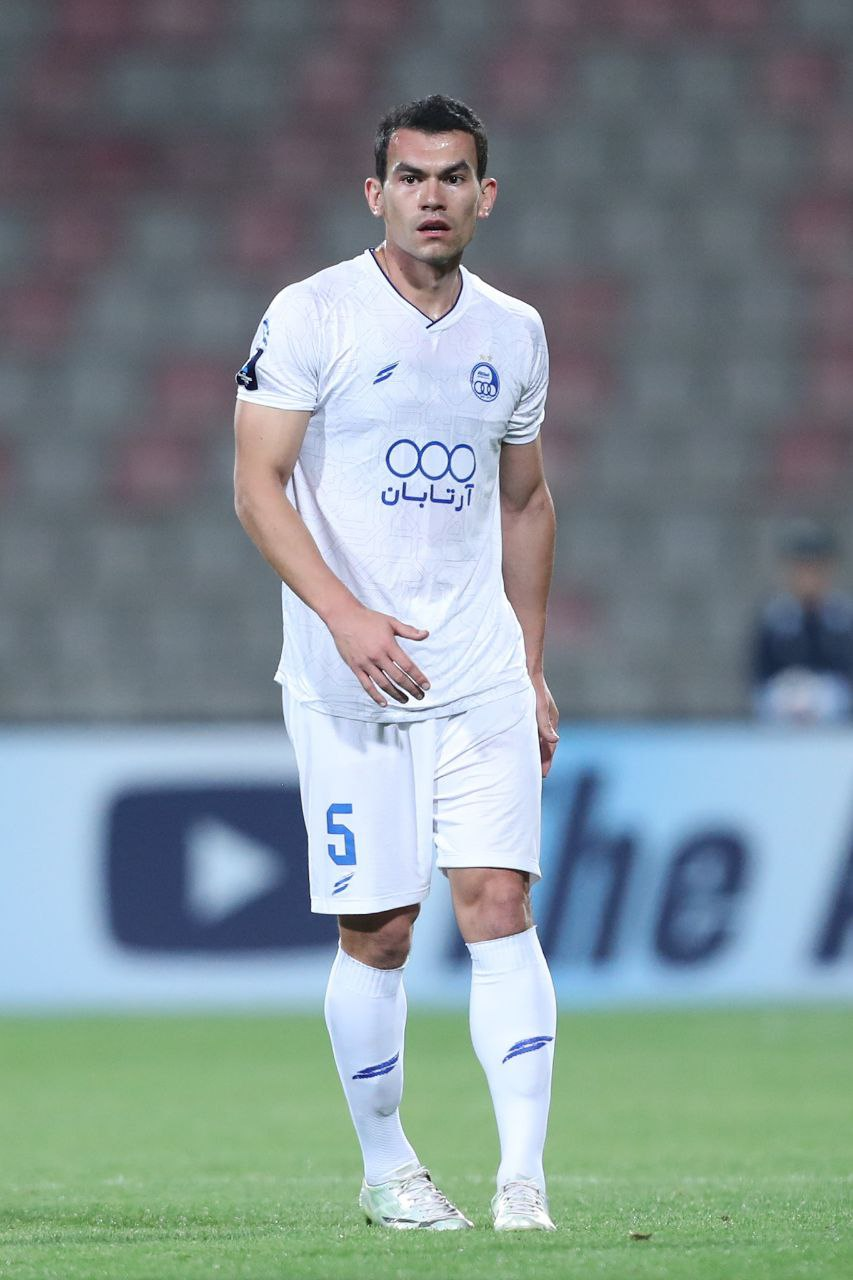
- Ashurmatov with Esteghlal in 2025

Personal information
- Date of birth: 7 July 1996 (age 30)
- Place of birth: Kokand, Uzbekistan
- Height: 1.86 m (6 ft 1 in)
- Position: Centre back

Team information
- Current team: Esteghlal
- Number: 5

Youth career
- Bunyodkor-2

Senior career*
Years	Team	Apps	(Gls)
2015–2019	Bunyodkor	91	(5)
2019–2020	Gwangju	47	(2)
2021–2022	Gangwon	19	(1)
2022	Navbahor Namangan	25	(2)
2023–2025	Rubin Kazan	33	(2)
2025–	Esteghlal	24	(1)

International career^{‡}
2013	Uzbekistan U17	6	(1)
2015	Uzbekistan U20	6	(0)
2017–2018	Uzbekistan U23	12	(1)
2017–	Uzbekistan	54	(1)
Medal record
Men's football
Representing Uzbekistan
FIFA Series
Winner	2026 Uzbekistan
AFC U-23 Championship
Gold medal – first place	2018 China	Team
- * Club domestic league appearances and goals as of 7 November 2026 ‡ National team caps and goals as of 28 June 2026

Rustam Elyorovich Ashurmatov (Uzbek Cyrillic: Рустам Элёрович Ашурматов; born 7 July 1996), sometimes spelt as Rustamjon Ashurmatov, is an Uzbek footballer who plays as a defender for Iranian club Esteghlal and the Uzbekistan national team.

== Club career ==
On 7 February 2019, FC Bunyodkor announced that Ashurmatov had joined Gwangju.

On 19 January 2021, Gangwon FC announced that Ashurmatov had joined Gangwon. Gangwon announced that Ashurmatov left the club on 15 February 2022.

On 18 February 2022, Ashurmatov signed with Navbahor Namangan.

On 14 January 2023, Ashurmatov joined FC Rubin Kazan in Russia on a 3.5-year contract.

On 9 July 2025, Ashurmatov joined Esteghlal in Iran on a 2-year contract.

== International career ==
A player for the Uzbekistan national football team since 2017, Ashurmatov has also have played for the Uzbekistan national youth teams in international tournaments such as 2013 FIFA U-17 World Cup, 2015 FIFA U-20 World Cup, and 2018 AFC U-23 Championship, in which he would win the latter tournament with Uzbekistan national under-23 football team, with him scoring in the final.

On 2 June 2026, he was included in the 26-man squad selected by head coach Fabio Cannavaro for the 2026 FIFA World Cup, marking the country's first-ever appearance in the tournament.

== Career statistics ==
=== Club ===
As of match played 7 November 2026

Appearances and goals by club, season and competition
Club	Season	League			Cup		Continental		Other		Total	
Club	Season	Division	Apps	Goals	Apps	Goals	Apps	Goals	Apps	Goals	Apps	Goals
Bunyodkor	2015	Uzbekistan Super League	11	0	0	0	6 (Note: Appearances in the AFC Champions League)	0	—		17	0
Bunyodkor	2016	Uzbekistan Super League	27	0	0	0	7	0	—		34	0
Bunyodkor	2017	Uzbekistan Super League	24	3	1	0	—		—		25	3
Bunyodkor	2018	Uzbekistan Super League	29	2	3	0	—		—		32	2
Bunyodkor	Total		80	5	4	1	13	0	—		91	5
Gwangju FC	2019	K League 2	26	1	1	0	—		—		27	1
Gwangju FC	2020	K League 1	21	1	—		—		—		21	1
Gwangju FC	Total		47	2	1	0	—		—		48	2
Gangwon FC	2021	K League 1	19	1	2	0	—		—		21	1
Navbahor Namangan	2022	Uzbekistan Super League	25	2	7	0	—		—		32	2
Rubin Kazan	2022–23	Russian First League	5	1	0	0	—		—		5	1
Rubin Kazan	2023–24	Russian Premier League	14	1	5	1	—		—		19	2
Rubin Kazan	2024–25	Russian Premier League	14	0	7	0	—		—		21	0
Rubin Kazan	Total		33	2	12	1	—		—		45	3
Esteghlal	2025–26	Pro League	14	1	1	0	7	0	—		22	1
Esteghlal	2026–27	Pro League	10	0	0	0	4	0	—		14	0
Esteghlal	Total		24	1	1	0	11	0	0	0	36	1
Career total			239	13	27	1	24	0	0	0	290	14

=== International ===
As of match played 27 June 2026

Appearances and goals by national team and year
National team	Year	Apps	Goals
Uzbekistan	2017	2	0
Uzbekistan	2018	3	0
Uzbekistan	2019	5	0
Uzbekistan	2020	2	0
Uzbekistan	2021	3	0
Uzbekistan	2022	7	0
Uzbekistan	2023	7	0
Uzbekistan	2024	11	1
Uzbekistan	2025	7	0
Uzbekistan	2026	7	0
Total		54	1

No.	Date	Venue	Opponent	Score	Result	Competition
1	21 March 2024	Mong Kok Stadium, Hong Kong	Hong Kong	2–0	2–0	2026 FIFA World Cup qualification

== Honours ==
Rubin

- Russian First League: 2022–23

Gwangju

- K League 2: 2019

Uzbekistan U-23

- AFC U-23 Championship: 2018

Uzbekistan

- FIFA Series Runner-Up: 2026
