= Akbar Turaev =

Uzbekistani footballer

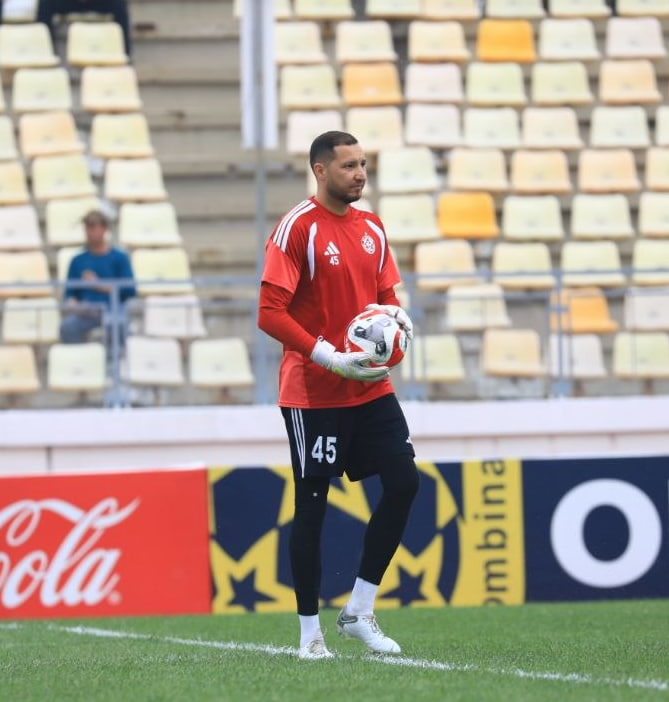

Personal information
- Full name: Akbar Turaev
- Date of birth: 27 August 1989 (age 37)
- Place of birth: Tashkent, Uzbekistan, USSR
- Height: 1.90 m (6 ft 3 in)
- Position: Goalkeeper

Team information
- Current team: FK Neftchi Fergana
- Number: 45

Youth career
- 2007–2009: Bunyodkor

Senior career*
Years	Team	Apps	(Gls)
2010–2016	Bunyodkor	26	(0)
2017	AGMK	7	(0)
2018	Navbahor	17	(0)
2019	AGMK	5	(0)
2020–2021	Surkhon	13	(0)
2021–	FK Neftchi Fergana	47	(0)
Total		115	(0)

International career^{‡}
2008–2009	Uzbekistan U-20	3	(0)
2008–2010	Uzbekistan U-21	3	(0)
2012	Uzbekistan U-23	2	(0)
2014–	Uzbekistan	2	(0)
- * Club domestic league appearances and goals as of 20 November 2015 ‡ National team caps and goals as of 19:38, 28 June 2020 (UTC)

Akbar Turaev (born 27 August 1989) is an Uzbek footballer who currently plays as a goalkeeper for Surkhon Termez.

== Career statistics ==
=== Club ===
As of match played 19 August 2017

Club	Season	League			National Cup		Continental		Other		Total	
Club	Season	Division	Apps	Goals	Apps	Goals	Apps	Goals	Apps	Goals	Apps	Goals
Bunyodkor	2012	Uzbek League	1	0	0	0	0	0	0	0	1	0
Bunyodkor	2013	Uzbek League	0	0	0	0	0	0	0	0	0	0
Bunyodkor	2014	Uzbek League	16	0	5	0	5	0	0	0	26	0
Bunyodkor	2015	Uzbek League	8	0	2	0	6	0	0	0	16	0
Bunyodkor	2016	Uzbek League	1	0	2	0	0	0	0	0	3	0
Bunyodkor	Total		26	0	9	0	11	0	0	0	46	0
AGMK	2017	Uzbek League	7	0	0	0	–		–		7	0
Career total			33	0	9	0	11	0	0	0	53	0

=== International ===
Uzbekistan national team
Year	Apps	Goals
2014	1	0
2015	1	0
Total	2	0

Statistics accurate as of match played 31 March 2015
