= FC Obod =

FC Obod Tashkent
- Full name: Football Club Obod
- Founded: 2012
- Dissolved: 2017; 8 years ago
- Ground: Obod Stadium
- Capacity: 4,500
- Manager: Khayrulla Abdiev
- League: First League
- 2017: 16th Uzbekistan First League ▼
Home colours	Away colours

FC Obod Tashkent (Uzbek: Obod futbol klubi) is an Uzbekistani football club based in Tashkent.

== History ==
The club was formed in 2012 and started to play in the Uzbekistan Second League. Since 2013 the club has played in Uzbekistan First League. In 2014 Obod finished third in League. A year later in 2015, the club won the First League and was promoted to the highest tier, Uzbek League, for the 2016 season.

== League history ==
Season	Div.	Pos.	Pl.	W	D	L	GS	GA	P
2014^{1}	1st League	3	30	20	3	7	61	33	63
2015^{1}	1st League	1	30	20	5	5	98	37	65
2016	UzL	14	30	6	6	18	25	51	24
2017	UzL	16							

In 2014–2015 seasons the league position and match statistics after championship round.

== Honours ==
- Uzbekistan First League
  - Champions (1): 2015

== Managerial history ==
Name	Period
(Uzbekistan) Khayrulla Abdiev	2015–
