= 2014 FC Bunyodkor season =

FC Bunyodkor
2014 season
- Manager: Mirjalol Qosimov (until 5 April 2014); Alexander Volkov (ad interim, until 6 June 2014); Sergey Lushan (from 6 June 2014)
- Uzbek League: 4th
- Uzbekistan Cup: Runners-Up vs Lokomotiv Tashkent
- Uzbekistan Super Cup: Winners
- AFC Champions League: Round of 16 vs Al-Hilal
- Top goalscorer: League: Sardor Rashidov (10); All: Sardor Rashidov (15)
Home colours	Away colours

The 2014 season was Bunyodkor’s eighth season in the Uzbek League in Uzbekistan, of which they were the defending Champions having won the 2013 title. Bunyodkor failed to defend their title and finished the season in fourth position. Bunyodkor won the Uzbekistan Super Cup, reached the Round of 16 in the AFC Champions League, where they were defeated by Al-Hilal, and the Final of the Uzbekistan Cup.

== Club ==
=== Current technical staff ===
Position	Name
Head coach	(Russia) Sergey Lushan
Assistant coach	(Uzbekistan) Yuriy Sarkisyan
Assistant coach	(Uzbekistan) Hikmat Irgashev
Assistant coach	(Uzbekistan) Murod Otajonov
Fitness coach	(Uzbekistan) Alexander Volkov
Goalkeeping coach	(Uzbekistan) Abdusattar Rakhimov
Club doctor	(Uzbekistan) Qakhramon Nurmukhammedov

== Players ==
=== Squad ===
As of 2 August 2014

Note: Flags indicate national team as defined under FIFA eligibility rules; some limited exceptions apply. Players may hold more than one non-FIFA nationality.

No.	Pos.	Nation	Player
1	GK	UZB	Pavel Bugalo
2	DF	UZB	Akmal Shorakhmedov
3	DF	UZB	Shukurali Pulatov
4	DF	UZB	Hayrulla Karimov
5	DF	UZB	Dilshod Juraev
6	DF	UZB	Anvar Gafurov
7	MF	UZB	Alibobo Rakhmatullaev
8	MF	UZB	Jovlon Ibrokhimov
9	MF	JPN	Minori Sato
10	FW	UZB	Anvar Berdiev
11	FW	UKR	Oleksandr Pyschur
13	DF	SRB	Ivan Milošević
14	MF	UZB	Vokhid Shodiev
15	DF	UZB	Islom Inomov

No.	Pos.	Nation	Player
19	FW	UZB	Zabikhillo Urinboev
20	MF	BIH	Samir Bekrić
21	FW	UZB	Sardor Rashidov
25	GK	UZB	Murod Zukhurov
27	MF	UZB	Sardor Sabirkhodjaev
30	DF	UZB	Khasan Askarov
33	MF	UZB	Oleg Zoteev
35	GK	UZB	Abdukarim Mukhammedov
44	MF	UZB	Mirjamol Kosimov
45	GK	UZB	Akbar Turaev
46	MF	UZB	Sardorbek Azimov
—	DF	UZB	Rustam Azamov
—	MF	UZB	Khursid Giyosov

=== Reserve squad ===
The following players are listed as reserve players to play in 2014 Uzbek Youth League. They are registered for 2014 Uzbek League and are eligible to play for the first team.

As of 2 August 2014

Note: Flags indicate national team as defined under FIFA eligibility rules; some limited exceptions apply. Players may hold more than one non-FIFA nationality.

No.	Pos.	Nation	Player
28	MF	UZB	Dostonbek Khamdamov
29	MF	UZB	Ahror Umarjonov
32	FW	UZB	Georgiy Pogosov
34	MF	UZB	Zokirjon Nurmatov
36	DF	UZB	Shahzod Abdurakhimov
37	FW	UZB	Sanzhar Rikhsiboev
38	FW	UZB	Timur Ayupov
41	DF	UZB	Shahriyor Imomkhujaev

No.	Pos.	Nation	Player
42	MF	UZB	Khurshid Giyasov
43	MF	UZB	Ergash Ismoilov
47	DF	UZB	Aziz Mamazoitov
48	DF	UZB	Akram Komilov
50	MF	UZB	Ibrokhim Gafurov
51	MF	UZB	Farkhod Nomozov
59	MF	UZB	Nuriddin Khasanov
92	MF	UZB	Nodirjon Atadjanov

== Transfers ==
=== Winter 2013-14 ===
In: Note: Flags indicate national team as defined under FIFA eligibility rules; some limited exceptions apply. Players may hold more than one non-FIFA nationality.

No.	Pos.	Nation	Player
1	GK	UZB	Pavel Bugalo (from (Uzbekistan) Lokomotiv Tashkent)
3	DF	UZB	Shukurali Pulatov (from (Uzbekistan) Neftchi Farg'ona)
9	MF	JPN	Minori Sato (from (Belarus) Dinamo Brest)
13	DF	UZB	Rustam Azamov (from (Uzbekistan) Navbahor Namangan)
14	MF	UZB	Vokhid Shodiev (from (Uzbekistan) FK Buxoro)
15	DF	UZB	Islom Inomov (from (Uzbekistan) Lokomotiv Tashkent)
16	MF	ESP	Carles Coto (from (Belarus) Dinamo Minsk)
18	DF	UZB	Boburjon Akbarov (from (Uzbekistan) FK Guliston)
40	DF	UKR	Serhiy Symonenko (from (Ukraine) Sevastopol)
—	MF	UZB	Mansurjon Saidov (from (Uzbekistan) Neftchi Farg'ona)
—	MF	UZB	Jahongir Jiyamuradov (from (Uzbekistan) Nasaf Qarshi)

Out: Note: Flags indicate national team as defined under FIFA eligibility rules; some limited exceptions apply. Players may hold more than one non-FIFA nationality.

No.	Pos.	Nation	Player
1	GK	UZB	Ignatiy Nesterov (to (Uzbekistan) Lokomotiv Tashkent)
3	DF	UZB	Abdukakhkhor Khojiakbarov (to (Uzbekistan) Olmaliq FK)
7	MF	SRB	Marko Blažić (to (Kazakhstan) Atyrau)
9	FW	UZB	Igor Taran (to (Uzbekistan) Nasaf Qarshi)
13	MF	UZB	Lutfulla Turaev (to (Uzbekistan) Lokomotiv Tashkent)
16	DF	UZB	Artyom Filiposyan (to (China) Liaoning Whowin)
19	MF	UZB	Jasur Hasanov (to (Uzbekistan) Lokomotiv Tashkent)
—	MF	UZB	Jahongir Jiyamuradov (to (Uzbekistan) Neftchi Farg'ona)
—	MF	UZB	Mansurjon Saidov (to (Uzbekistan) Navbahor Namangan)

=== Out on loan ===
Note: Flags indicate national team as defined under FIFA eligibility rules; some limited exceptions apply. Players may hold more than one non-FIFA nationality.

No.	Pos.	Nation	Player
3	DF	UZB	Shukurali Pulatov (at Navbahor Namangan)
26	DF	UZB	Javlon Mirabdullaev (at FK Andijan)
28	DF	UZB	Kamranbey Kapadze (at FK Andijan)

No.	Pos.	Nation	Player
34	GK	UZB	Dilshod Khamraev (at Qizilqum Zarafshon)
—	MF	UZB	Orifjon Mamajonov (at Navbahor Namangan)
—		UZB	Furqat Khasanboev (at Sogdiana Jizzakh)

=== Players on Trial ===
The following players have been on trial during training camps in January–February 2014

Note: Flags indicate national team as defined under FIFA eligibility rules; some limited exceptions apply. Players may hold more than one non-FIFA nationality.

No.	Pos.	Nation	Player
—	MF	SVK	Kamil Kopúnek ( (Slovakia) Slovan Bratislava)
—	MF	TKM	Arslanmyrat Amanow ( (Turkmenistan) HTTU Aşgabat)
—	DF	UKR	Vyacheslav Sharpar ( (Ukraine) Arsenal Kyiv)
—	DF	UKR	Rizvan Ablitarov ( (Ukraine) Sevastopol)

=== Summer 2014 ===
In: Note: Flags indicate national team as defined under FIFA eligibility rules; some limited exceptions apply. Players may hold more than one non-FIFA nationality.

No.	Pos.	Nation	Player
3	DF	UZB	Shukurali Pulatov (end of loan at (Uzbekistan) Navbahor Namangan)
13	DF	SRB	Ivan Milošević (from (Serbia) FK Napredak Kruševac)
20	MF	BIH	Samir Bekrić (from (Iran) Fajr Sepasi)

Out: Note: Flags indicate national team as defined under FIFA eligibility rules; some limited exceptions apply. Players may hold more than one non-FIFA nationality.

No.	Pos.	Nation	Player
16	MF	ESP	Carles Coto (to (Italy) San Marino)
18	DF	UZB	Boburjon Akbarov (on loan to Navbahor Namangan)
23	DF	UZB	Sakhob Juraev (to Lokomotiv Tashkent)
24	FW	UZB	Bahodir Pardaev (to FC Pakhtakor)
49	MF	UZB	Sanzhar Qodirqulov (to FC Bunyodkor-2)
39	DF	UZB	Jahongir Khodjamov (to FC Bunyodkor-2)
40	DF	UKR	Serhiy Symonenko

== Friendly matches ==
=== Preseason ===
8 January 2014 Friendly	Bunyodkor	0 - 1	Olmaliq FK	Tashkent, Uzbekistan
			Dilyaver Abibullaev (pen.)

8 January 2014 Friendly	Bunyodkor	2 - 1	Olmaliq FK	Tashkent, Uzbekistan
	O.Mamajonov; M.Qosimov		Alexandr Lupashko

22 January 2014 Friendly	Rostov (Russia)	1 - 1	(Uzbekistan) Bunyodkor	Dubai, UAE
18:00 UTC+6	Kalachev 22'		Shodiev 43'

25 January 2014 Friendly	Dynamo Moscow (Russia)	0 - 0	(Uzbekistan) Bunyodkor	Dubai, UAE
18:00 UTC+6	Dzsudzsák (yellow card) 56'

30 January 2014 Friendly	Spartak Moscow (Russia)	2 - 1	(Uzbekistan) Bunyodkor	Abu Dhabi, UAE
20:30 UTC+6	Obukhov 56'; Özbiliz 69'		Pardaev 79' (pen.)	Stadium: Al Nahyan Stadium

6 February 2014 Friendly	Jagiellonia Białystok (Poland)	1 - 0	(Uzbekistan) Bunyodkor	Antalya, Turkey
19:30 UTC+6	Plizga 61' (pen.)

9 February 2014 Friendly	Bansko (Bulgaria)	0 - 0	(Uzbekistan) Bunyodkor	Antalya, Turkey
18:00 UTC+6

9 February 2014 Friendly	Lokomotiv Sofia (Bulgaria)	0 - 1	(Uzbekistan) Bunyodkor	Antalya, Turkey
22:00 UTC+6			Shodiev 58'

13 February 2014 Friendly	Illichivets Mariupol (Ukraine)	4 - 1	(Uzbekistan) Bunyodkor	Antalya, Turkey
15:00 UTC+6	Fomin 26'; Kulach 47'; Vitsenets 54'; Alexander Filippov 70'	Report	Pardaev 7'

13 February 2014 Friendly	Torpedo-BelAZ Zhodino (Belarus)	2 - 1	(Uzbekistan) Bunyodkor	Antalya, Turkey
21:00 UTC+6	Kontsevoy 9'; Platonaw 72'		Zoteev 19'

16 February 2014 Friendly	Shakhter Karagandy (Kazakhstan)	1 - 0	(Uzbekistan) Bunyodkor	Antalya, Turkey
16:00 UTC+6	Toktar Zhangylyshbai

=== Mid-season ===
17 July 2014 Friendly	MC Alger (Algeria)	1 - 1	(Uzbekistan) Bunyodkor	Kartepe, Turkey
21:00 UTC+6		Summary

19 July 2014 Friendly	Dinamo Batumi (Georgia (country))	1 - 0	(Uzbekistan) Bunyodkor	Kartepe, Turkey
14:00 UTC+6	Goal	Summary

20 July 2014 Friendly	Sumgayit (Azerbaijan)	1 - 0	(Uzbekistan) Bunyodkor	Kartepe, Turkey
21:00 UTC+6	Kurbanov 33' (pen.)	Report

23 July 2014 Friendly	Dinamo Batumi (Georgia (country))	0 - 0	(Uzbekistan) Bunyodkor	Kartepe, Turkey
21:00 UTC+6		Report

== Competitions ==
Bunyodkor is present in all major competitions: Uzbek League, Uzbek Cup and the AFC Champions League.

=== Uzbek Super Cup ===
7 March 2014	Lokomotiv Tashkent	1 – 2	Bunyodkor	Tashkent
15:00 UZT (UTC+5)	Yevgeni Gogol (yellow card) 15'; Turaev (yellow card) 38'; Inomov (yellow card) 58'; Nagaev (yellow card) 77'; Shevchenko 80'	Report	Gafurov (yellow card) 6'; Pyschur 27'; Ibrokhimov (yellow card) 54'; Shodiev 67' (yellow card) 88'; Karimov (yellow card) 90+4'	Stadium: JAR Stadium; Attendance: 4,751; Referee: Ravshan Irmatov

=== Uzbek League ===
==== Results summary ====
Overall								Home						Away					
Pld	W	D	L	GF	GA	GD	Pts	W	D	L	GF	GA	GD	W	D	L	GF	GA	GD
26	15	6	5	44	20	+24	51	7	3	3	26	11	+15	8	3	2	18	9	+9

Last updated: 7 November 2014.
Source: Soccerway

==== Results by round ====
Round	1	2	3	4	5	6	7	8	9	10	11	12	13	14	15	16	17	18	19	20	21	22	23	24	25	26
Ground	H	A	H	A	H	A	H	A	H	A	H	H	A	A	H	A	H	A	H	A	H	A	H	A	A	H
Result	W	W	D	W	D	D	W	L	W	W	D	W	L	W	W	W	L	W	W	D	L	W	W	D	W	L
Position	2	2	4	2	2	3	3	4	4	3	3	3	4	4	3	3	4	4	4	4	4	4	4	4	4	4

Source: Soccerway
A = Away; H = Home; W = Win; D = Draw; L = Loss

==== Results ====
15 March 2013 1	Bunyodkor	2 – 1	Qizilqum Zarafshon	Tashkent
17:00 UZT (UTC+5)	Berdiev 24'; Shorakhmedov (yellow card) 29'; Karimov (yellow card) 65'; Shodiev 70'	Summary	E.Baymatov 29' (pen.); S.Djuraev (yellow card) 36'; N.Olimov (yellow card) 40'; M.Kurbanov 54'; A.Rustamov (yellow card) 86'	Stadium: Pakhtakor Markaziy Stadium; Attendance: 1,003; Referee: Ilgiz Tantashev

23 March 2013 2	Mash'al Mubarek	0 - 2	Bunyodkor	Mubarek
16:00 UZT (UTC+5)	O.Narzullaev (yellow card) 71'	Summary	D.Juraev 73'; Shodiev 90+2'	Stadium: Bahrom Vafoev Stadium; Attendance: 1,505; Referee: Valentin Kovalenko

27 March 2013 3	Bunyodkor	1 - 1	Olmaliq FK	Tashkent
17:00 UZT (UTC+5)	Karimov (yellow card) 53'; Shodiev (yellow card) 70'; Zoteev 84' (yellow card) 84'	Summary	S.Shoahmedov (yellow card) 38'; Zouagi (yellow card) 53'; Alempijević 55'; Z.Pirimov (yellow card) 86'	Stadium: JAR Stadium; Attendance: 1,425; Referee: Vladislav Tseytlin

6 April 2014 4	FK Dinamo Samarqand	0 - 2	Bunyodkor	Samarqand
16:00 UZT (UTC+5)	A.Bobojonov (yellow card) 20'; K.Sharofutdinov (yellow card) 82'; I.Mamatkazin (yellow card) 83'	Summary	A.Kholmurodov 14' (o.g.); Zoteev 64'; Sato (yellow card) 72'; Symonenko (yellow card) 79'	Stadium: Olimpiya Stadium; Attendance: 13,154; Referee: Aziz Asymov

11 April 2014 5	Bunyodkor	1 - 1	Lokomotiv Tashkent	Tashkent
18:00 UZT (UTC+5)	Symonenko (yellow card) 11'; Pyschur 38'; Shorakhmedov (yellow card) 43'; Ibrokhimov (yellow card) 64'; Turaev (yellow card) 65'; Karimov (yellow card) 90+2'; Zoteev (yellow card) 90+3'	Summary	Karpenko (yellow card) 44'; Tadjiyev 90'	Stadium: JAR Stadium; Attendance: 6,250; Referee: Khasan Ruziev

28 April 2014 6	FK Buxoro	1 - 1	Bunyodkor	Bukhoro
18:00 UZT (UTC+5)	Plămădeală 17'; O.Nurboev (yellow card) 65'; S.Nematov (yellow card) 82'	Summary	Shodiev 18'; D.Juraev (yellow card) 42'; S.Juraev (yellow card) 55'; Karimov (yellow card) 84' (yellow-red card) 88'	Stadium: Buxoro Arena; Attendance: 12,811; Referee: Ravshan Irmatov

2 May 2014 7	Bunyodkor	3 - 0	Navbahor Namangan	Tashkent
18:00 UZT (UTC+5)	Shorakhmedov (yellow card) 57'; Shodiev 58'; Zoteev (yellow card) 68'; Symonenko (yellow card) 76'; Rashidov 90'; Pyschur 90+2'	Summary	R.Khasanov (yellow card) 16'; Ryzhko (yellow card) 49'; I.Boydedaev (yellow card) 54'	Stadium: JAR Stadium; Attendance: 2,476; Referee: Murod Mukhammedov

19 May 2014 8	Nasaf Qarshi	2 - 0	Bunyodkor	Qarshi
19:00 UZT (UTC+5)	I.Yunusov 10' (yellow card) 71'; B.Karaev (yellow card) 62'; Suyunov (yellow card) 69'; I.Shomurodov 78'	Summary	Symonenko (yellow card) 40'; Shorakhmedov (yellow card) 72'; D.Juraev (yellow card) 90'	Stadium: Markaziy Stadium; Attendance: 15,889; Referee: Vladislav Tseytlin

23 May 2014 9	Bunyodkor	2 - 0	Metallurg Bekabad	Tashkent
19:00 UZT (UTC+5)	Pyschur 52'; Rashidov 55'; Inomov (yellow card) 64'; Zoteev (yellow card) 89'	Summary	S.Rasulov (yellow card) 89'	Stadium: JAR Stadium; Attendance: 1,485; Referee: Zokir Kadyrov

1 June 2014 10	Sogdiana Jizzakh	0 - 2	Bunyodkor	Jizzakh
17:00 UZT (UTC+5)	A.Begimkulov (yellow card) 45+3'	Summary	T.Ayupov (yellow card) 66' (goal) 86'; Shorakhmedov 78'	Stadium: Markaziy Stadium; Attendance: 5,205; Referee: Bakhtiyor Namazov

5 June 2014 11	Bunyodkor	1 - 1	Neftchi Farg'ona	Tashkent
19:00 UZT (UTC+5)	S.Juraev (yellow card) 12'; Shorakhmedov (yellow card) 71'; T. Ayupov 82'	Summary	Smolyachenko (yellow card) 33'; G.Khasanov (yellow card) 72'; I.Babakhanov (yellow card) 84'; M. Bobojonov 90'	Stadium: JAR Stadium; Attendance: 1,830; Referee: Murid Mukhammedov

14 June 2014 12	Bunyodkor	2 - 0	FK Andijan	Tashkent
19:00 UZT (UTC+5)	Pyschur 34'; Inomov (yellow card) 66'; Rashidov 69'	Summary		Stadium: JAR Stadium; Attendance: 681; Referee: Sherzod Kasymov

5 July 2014 13	Pakhtakor	3 - 1	Bunyodkor	Tashkent
19:30 UZT (UTC+5)	Sergeev 45+1', 46'; Ismatullaev (yellow card) 51'; Makharadze 53' B.Iskandarov (yellow card) 89'	Summary	Pyschur (red card) 11'; Ibrokhimov (yellow card) 48'; Shodiev 84'	Stadium: Pakhtakor Stadium; Attendance: 2,412; Referee: Olim Talibdjanov

3 August 2014 14	Qizilqum Zarafshon	0 - 2	Bunyodkor	Navoi
19:00 UZT (UTC+5)	E.Baymatov (yellow card) 17' (red card) 85'; A.Mukhiddinov (yellow card) 55'; Olimov (yellow card) 61'; S.Djuraev (red card) 90+2'	Summary	Z.Urinboev (yellow card) 55'; Karimov (yellow card) 85'; D.Khamdamov 87'; Ibrokhimov 90+4'	Stadium: Yoshlar Stadium; Attendance: 10,112; Referee: Vladislav Tseytlin

10 August 2014 15	Bunyodkor	5 - 1	Mash'al Mubarek	Tashkent
19:00 UZT (UTC+5)	Rashidov 18', 25', 26'; D.Khamdamov 68'; Komilov 88'	Summary	Mamazulunov 32'; Abdumuminov (yellow card) 36'; A.Derkach (yellow card) 54'; Z.Kuziboyev (yellow card) 55'; G.Komilov (yellow card) 69'	Stadium: JAR Stadium; Attendance: 2,384; Referee: Aziz Asymov

15 August 2014 16	Olmaliq FK	1 - 2	Bunyodkor	Olmaliq
19:00 UZT (UTC+5)	Zouagi 16' (pen.)	Summary	Shorakhmedov (yellow card) 15'; Rashidov 22'; Pyschur 45'	Stadium: Olmaliq Stadium; Attendance: 6,021; Referee: Ravshan Irmatov

23 August 2014 17	Bunyodkor	0 - 1	Samarqand-Dinamo	Tashkent
19:00 UZT (UTC+5)	D.Khamdamov (yellow card) 11'; S.Pulatov (yellow card) 45+2' (yellow-red card) 82'; Sato (yellow card) 89'	Summary	A.Melnichuk (yellow card) 79'; F.Abdusalimov (yellow card) 83'; A.Bobojonov 90+4'	Stadium: JAR Stadium; Attendance: 1,663; Referee: Murod Mukhammedov

28 August 2014 18	Lokomotiv Tashkent	1 - 2	Bunyodkor	Tashkent
18:00 UZT (UTC+5)	Tadjiyev 41' (pen.); Mullajanov (yellow card) 44'; Geynrikh (yellow card) 49'; J.O.Hasanov (yellow card) 83'; S.Mustafoev (red card) 90'	Summary	Z.Urinboev 19'; Shorakhmedov (yellow card) 65'; Milošević 69'; Ibrokhimov (yellow card) 90+2'; Z.Urinboev (yellow card) 90+3'	Stadium: Lokomotiv Stadium; Attendance: 5,112; Referee: Valentin Kovalenko

13 September 2014 19	Bunyodkor	5 - 0	FK Buxoro	Tashkent
18:00 UZT (UTC+5)	Milošević (yellow card) 19'; N.Xasanov (yellow card) 37'; Pyschur 41'; Sato 71'; D.Khamdamov 78', 79'; Z.Urinboev 90'	Summary	J.Ubaydullaev (yellow card) 15'; O.Narzullaev (yellow card) 42'	Stadium: JAR Stadium; Attendance: 2,058; Referee: Zokir Kadyrov

20 September 2014 20	Navbahor Namangan	0 - 0	Bunyodkor	Namangan
18:00 UZT (UTC+5)		Summary		Stadium: Namangan Stadium; Attendance: 8,362; Referee: Ravshan Irmatov

25 September 2014 21	Bunyodkor	1 - 2	Nasaf Qarshi	Tashkent
18:00 UZT (UTC+5)	T.Ayupov 86' (pen.) (yellow card) 87'	Summary	Shomurodov 2'; Gevorkyan 84'	Stadium: JAR Stadium; Attendance: 3,210; Referee: Marat Ismailov

1 October 2014 22	Metallurg Bekabad	1 - 2	Bunyodkor	Bekabad
16:00 UZT (UTC+5)	M.Mirabdullaev (yellow card) 36'; A.Ziyavutdinov (yellow card) 57'; S.Norbekov 70'; D.Adilov (red card) 76'	Summary	Bekrić 8'; Karimov (red card) 57'; Zoteev 69'; Gafurov (yellow card) 74'	Stadium: Metallurg Bekabad Stadium; Attendance: 1,925; Referee: Olim Talibdjanov

18 October 2014 23	Bunyodkor	1 - 0	Sogdiana Jizzakh	Tashkent
UZT (UTC+5)	Shodiev 10'	Summary		Stadium: Bunyodkor Stadium; Attendance: 2,687; Referee: Sherzod Kasymov

25 October 2014 24	Neftchi Farg'ona	0 - 0	Bunyodkor	Farghona
15:00 UZT (UTC+5)		Summary		Stadium: Kirguli SM Stadium; Attendance: 4,701; Referee: Vladislav Tseytlin

2 November 2014 25	FK Andijan	0 - 2	Bunyodkor	Andijan
15:00 UZT (UTC+5)		Summary	Rashidov 7'; Milošević 12'	Stadium: Soghlom Avlod Stadium; Attendance: 2,043; Referee: Zokir Kadyrov

7 November 2014 26	Bunyodkor	2 - 3	Pakhtakor Tashkent	Tashkent
14:00 UZT (UTC+5)	Rashidov 38', 47'	Summary	Sergeev 79', 90'; Iskanderov 89'	Stadium: Bunyodkor Stadium; Attendance: 6,785; Referee: Ravshan Irmatov

==== League table ====
Pos	Team	Pld	W	D	L	GF	GA	GD	Pts	Qualification or relegation
2	Lokomotiv Tashkent	26	20	4	2	58	21	+37	64	2015 AFC Champions League group stage (Note: Number of entrants per association for 2015 AFC Champions League can be changed.)
3	Nasaf Qarshi	26	16	7	3	45	21	+24	55	2015 AFC Champions League group stage
4	Bunyodkor	26	15	6	5	44	20	+24	51	2015 AFC Champions League Third qualifying round
5	Mash'al Mubarek	26	10	6	10	37	42	−5	36	
6	Olmaliq FK	26	8	7	11	33	38	−5	31	

Updated to match(es) played on 7 November 2014. Source: Uzbekistan Professional Football League
Rules for classification: 1) points; 2) goal difference; 3) number of goals scored.

=== Uzbek Cup ===
10 June 2014 Quarterfinal 1st leg	Bunyodkor	2 - 2	Olmaliq FK	Tashkent
19:00 UZT (UTC+5)	Shodiev 21'; Rashidov 34'; Karimov (yellow card) 56'; D.Juraev (yellow card) 81'	Summary	O. Djurabayev 42'; Zouagi (yellow card) 50'; Mullajanov (yellow card) 79'; A.Khojiakbarov (yellow card) 88'; S. Khakimov 90+3'	Stadium: JAR Stadium; Attendance: 1,004; Referee: Aziz Asymov

16 June 2014 Quarterfinal 2ng leg	Olmaliq FK	0 - 4 (2 - 6 agg.)	Bunyodkor	Olmaliq
19:00 UZT (UTC+5)	S.Khakimov (yellow card) 55'; Mullajanov (yellow card) 78'	Summary	Shorakhmedov (yellow card) 25'; Rashidov 14', 43', 51'; Zoteev 30'	Stadium: Olmaliq Stadium; Attendance: 5,790; Referee: Olim Talibdjanov

26 June 2014 Semifinal 1st leg	Bunyodkor	1 - 0	Nasaf Qarshi	Tashkent
19:00 UZT (UTC+5)	Pyschur (yellow card) 16'; Karimov (yellow card) 53'; Shodiev 89'	Summary		Stadium: JAR Stadium; Attendance: 2,743; Referee: Vladislav Tseytlin

1 July 2014 Semifinal 2nd leg	Nasaf Qarshi	1 - 1 (a.e.t.) (1 - 2 agg.)	Bunyodkor	Qarshi
20:00 UZT (UTC+5)	Gevorkyan 27' (pen.); F.Sayfiev (yellow card) 54'; K.Karimov (red card) 90+1'	Summary	Komilov (yellow card) 19'; Zoteev (yellow card) 54'; Ibrokhimov (yellow card) 69'; Z.Urinboev (yellow card) 72' (yellow-red card) 90+1'; Shodiev 95'	Stadium: Qarshi Stadium; Attendance: 8,770; Referee: Bakhtiyor Namazov

12 November 2014 Final	Lokomotiv Tashkent	1 - 0 (a.e.t.)	Bunyodkor	Olmaliq
17:00 UZT (UTC+5)	J.O.Hasanov 107' (yellow card) 119'	Summary	Gafurov (yellow card) 56'; Ibrokhimov (yellow card) 87'	Stadium: Olmaliq SM Stadium; Attendance: 8,251; Referee: Cüneyt Çakır (Turkey)

=== AFC Champions League ===
==== Group stage ====
Pos	Team	Pld	W	D	L	GF	GA	GD	Pts	Qualification
1	(Iran) Foolad	6	4	2	0	11	3	+8	14	Advance to knockout stage
2	(Uzbekistan) Bunyodkor	6	2	2	2	7	7	0	8 (Note: Tiebreakers: Bunyodkor and El-Jaish are tied on head-to-head record and overall goal difference, and so are ranked on overall goals scored.)	Advance to knockout stage
3	(Qatar) El Jaish	6	2	2	2	6	6	0	8	
4	(Saudi Arabia) Al-Fateh	6	0	2	4	3	11	−8	2	

Notes:

25 February 2014 Group stage	Al-Fateh (Saudi Arabia)	0 - 0	(Uzbekistan) Bunyodkor	Al-Hasa, Saudi Arabia
22:00 UZT (UTC+5)	M.Al-Fuhaid (yellow card) 25'	Report	Shodiev (yellow card) 15'; D.Juraev (yellow card) 24'; S.Sabirkhodjaev (yellow card) 88'	Stadium: Prince Abdullah bin Jalawi Stadium; Attendance: 13,200; Referee: Kim Dong-Jin (South Korea)

11 March 2014 Group stage	Bunyodkor (Uzbekistan)	1 - 2	(Qatar) El Jaish	Tashkent, Uzbekistan
17:00 UZT (UTC+5)	Karimov (yellow card) 16'; S.Sabirkhodjaev (yellow card) 81'; Pyschur 90+3'	Report	Mothnani (yellow card) 31'; Nilmar 33', 70'; Soufiane (yellow card) 66'	Stadium: Pakhtakor Markaziy Stadium; Attendance: 3,600; Referee: Masaaki Toma (Japan)

19 March 2014 Group stage	Bunyodkor (Uzbekistan)	1 - 1	(Iran) Foolad	Tashkent, Uzbekistan
18:00 UZT (UTC+5)	Karimov (yellow card) 38'; Shodiev 90+2'	Report	Karami 74'; Karami (yellow card) 79'	Stadium: Pakhtakor Markaziy Stadium; Attendance: 1,950; Referee: Ali Abdulnabi (Bahrain)

1 April 2014 Group stage	Foolad (Iran)	1 - 0	(Uzbekistan) Bunyodkor	Ahvaz, Iran
18:00 UZT (UTC+5)	Vali 77'	Report	Symonenko (yellow card) 69'	Stadium: Ghadir Stadium; Attendance: 24,175; Referee: Mohamed Al Zarouni (United Arab Emirates)

16 April 2014 Group stage	Bunyodkor (Uzbekistan)	3 - 2	(Saudi Arabia) Al-Fateh	Tashkent, Uzbekistan
18:00 UZT (UTC+5)	Zoteev 43' (yellow card) 87'; S.Sabirkhodjaev (yellow card) 50'; Shodiev (yellow card) 60' (goal) 83'; Rakhmatullaev 85'; Ibrokhimov (yellow card) 90'	Report	A.Al-Dossary (yellow card) 49'; Fuakumputu 69'; Al-Hamdan 78'; Fuakumputu (yellow card) 90+4'	Stadium: Pakhtakor Markaziy Stadium; Attendance: 2,150; Referee: Ko Hyung-jin (South Korea)

23 April 2014 Group stage	El Jaish (Qatar)	1 - 2	(Uzbekistan) Bunyodkor	Doha, Qatar
21:00 UZT (UTC+5)	Muntari 52'; Soufiane (yellow card) 85'	Report	Symonenko 13' (yellow card) 19'; Rashidov 90+4'; Pardaev (yellow card) 90+4'	Stadium: Abdullah bin Khalifa Stadium; Attendance: 5,184; Referee: Mohanad Qasim Eesee Sarray (Iraq)

==== Knock-out phase ====
7 May 2014 Round of 16 1st leg	Bunyodkor (Uzbekistan)	0 - 1	(Saudi Arabia) Al-Hilal	Tashkent, Uzbekistan
18:00 UZT (UTC+5)	Karimov (yellow card) 34'	Report	Al-Dossari 38' (yellow card) 43'; Al-Qahtani (yellow card) 49'; Al-Sudairy (yellow card) 83'; Al-Dawsari (yellow card) 90'	Stadium: Pakhtakor Markaziy Stadium; Attendance: 5,360; Referee: Mohd Amirul Izwan Bin Yaacob (Malaysia)

14 May 2014 Round of 16 2nd leg	Al-Hilal (Saudi Arabia)	3 - 0 (4 - 0 agg.)	(Uzbekistan) Bunyodkor	Riyadh, Saudi Arabia
23:00 UZT (UTC+5)	Al-Qahtani 20'; Castillo (yellow card) 43'; Al-Shamrani 47'; S. Al-Dawsari 58'	Report	Ibrokhimov (yellow card) 23'	Stadium: King Fahd International Stadium; Attendance: 40,851; Referee: Ben Williams (Australia)

== Squad statistics ==
As of match played 12 November 2014

=== Appearances and goals ===
No.	Pos	Nat	Player	Total		Uzbek League		Uzbek Cup		AFC Champions League		Super Cup	
No.	Pos	Nat	Player	Apps	Goals	Apps	Goals	Apps	Goals	Apps	Goals	Apps	Goals
1	GK	(Uzbekistan) UZB	Pavel Bugalo	11	0	10	0	0	0	1	0	0	0
2	DF	(Uzbekistan) UZB	Akmal Shorakhmedov	35	1	19+2	1	5	0	8	0	1	0
3	DF	(Uzbekistan) UZB	Shukurali Pulatov	5	0	5	0	0	0	0	0	0	0
4	DF	(Uzbekistan) UZB	Hayrulla Karimov	31	0	18	0	5	0	7	0	1	0
5	DF	(Uzbekistan) UZB	Dilshod Juraev	25	1	9+6	1	1+2	0	4+3	0	0	0
6	DF	(Uzbekistan) UZB	Anvar Gafurov	34	0	23	0	5	0	5	0	1	0
7	MF	(Uzbekistan) UZB	Alibobo Rakhmatullaev	19	1	4+7	0	0+1	0	1+5	1	0+1	0
8	MF	(Uzbekistan) UZB	Jovlon Ibrokhimov	28	1	15+1	1	4	0	7	0	1	0
9	MF	(Japan) JPN	Minori Sato	19	1	10+5	1	4	0	0	0	0	0
10	FW	(Uzbekistan) UZB	Anvar Berdiev	13	1	8+3	1	0	0	0+2	0	0	0
11	FW	(Ukraine) UKR	Oleksandr Pyschur	31	8	15+4	6	3	0	8	1	1	1
13	DF	(Serbia) SRB	Ivan Milošević	13	2	12	2	1	0	0	0	0	0
14	MF	(Uzbekistan) UZB	Vokhid Shodiev	33	12	10+10	6	3+2	3	7	2	0+1	1
15	DF	(Uzbekistan) UZB	Islom Inomov	14	0	12	0	1+1	0	0	0	0	0
19	FW	(Uzbekistan) UZB	Zabikhillo Urinboev	10	2	3+5	2	0+2	0	0	0	0	0
20	MF	(Bosnia and Herzegovina) BIH	Samir Bekrić	13	1	12	1	1	0	0	0	0	0
21	FW	(Uzbekistan) UZB	Sardor Rashidov	34	15	16+5	10	5	4	6+1	1	0+1	0
25	GK	(Uzbekistan) UZB	Murod Zukhurov	3	0	0	0	0	0	2	0	1	0
27	MF	(Uzbekistan) UZB	Sardor Sabirkhodjaev	30	0	18+4	0	1	0	3+3	0	1	0
28	MF	(Uzbekistan) UZB	Dostonbek Khamdamov	10	4	6+1	4	0+3	0	0	0	0	0
30	DF	(Uzbekistan) UZB	Khasan Askarov	1	0	0	0	0	0	0+1	0	0	0
33	MF	(Uzbekistan) UZB	Oleg Zoteev	37	5	21+2	3	5	1	6+2	1	1	0
38	FW	(Uzbekistan) UZB	Timur Ayupov	7	3	1+4	3	1+1	0	0	0	0	0
44	MF	(Uzbekistan) UZB	Mirjamol Kosimov	1	0	0	0	0	0	0+1	0	0	0
45	GK	(Uzbekistan) UZB	Akbar Turaev	26	0	16	0	5	0	5	0	0	0
48	DF	(Uzbekistan) UZB	Akram Komilov	12	1	5+3	1	3+1	0	0	0	0	0
59	MF	(Uzbekistan) UZB	Nuriddin Khasanov	2	0	2	0	0	0	0	0	0	0
	MF	(Uzbekistan) UZB	Khursid Giyosov	1	0	0+1	0	0	0	0	0	0	0
Players who left Bunyodkor during the season:
16	MF	(Spain) ESP	Carles Coto	11	0	2+3	0	1	0	3+1	0	1	0
18	DF	(Uzbekistan) UZB	Boburjon Akbarov	5	0	2+1	0	0	0	0+2	0	0	0
23	DF	(Uzbekistan) UZB	Sakhob Juraev	13	0	6+1	0	1	0	5	0	0	0
24	FW	(Uzbekistan) UZB	Bahodir Pardaev	12	0	1+4	0	0	0	3+3	0	1	0
40	DF	(Ukraine) UKR	Serhiy Symonenko	14	1	5	0	0+1	0	7	1	1	0

=== Goal scorers ===
Place	Position	Nation	Number	Name	Uzbek League	Uzbekistan Cup	AFC Champions League	Super Cup	Total
1	FW	(Uzbekistan)	21	Sardor Rashidov	10	4	1	0	15
2	MF	(Uzbekistan)	14	Vokhid Shodiev	6	3	2	1	12
3	FW	(Ukraine)	11	Oleksandr Pyschur	6	0	1	1	8
4	MF	(Uzbekistan)	33	Oleg Zoteev	3	1	1	0	5
5	MF	(Uzbekistan)	28	Dostonbek Khamdamov	4	0	0	0	4
6	FW	(Uzbekistan)	38	Timur Ayupov	3	0	0	0	3
7	FW	(Uzbekistan)	19	Zabikhillo Urinboev	2	0	0	0	2
7	DF	(Serbia)	13	Ivan Milošević	2	0	0	0	2
9	FW	(Uzbekistan)	10	Anvar Berdiev	1	0	0	0	1
9	DF	(Uzbekistan)	5	Dilshod Juraev	1	0	0	0	1
9	MF	(Uzbekistan)	8	Jovlon Ibrokhimov	1	0	0	0	1
9	DF	(Uzbekistan)	48	Akram Komilov	1	0	0	0	1
9	MF	(Japan)	9	Minori Sato	1	0	0	0	1
9	MF	(Bosnia and Herzegovina)	20	Samir Bekrić	1	0	0	0	1
9	DF	(Uzbekistan)	2	Akmal Shorakhmedov	1	0	0	0	1
9				Own goal	1	0	0	0	1
9	MF	(Uzbekistan)	7	Alibobo Rakhmatullaev	0	0	1	0	1
9	DF	(Ukraine)	40	Serhiy Symonenko	0	0	1	0	1
				TOTALS	44	8	7	2	61

=== Disciplinary record ===
Number	Nation	Position	Name	Uzbek League		Uzbekistan Cup		AFC Champions League		Super Cup		Total	
Number	Nation	Position	Name	Yellow card	Red card	Yellow card	Red card	Yellow card	Red card	Yellow card	Red card	Yellow card	Red card
2	(Uzbekistan)	DF	Akmal Shorakhmedov	8	0	1	0	0	0	0	0	2	0
3	(Uzbekistan)	DF	Shukurali Pulatov	3	1	0	0	0	0	0	0	3	1
4	(Uzbekistan)	DF	Hayrulla Karimov	6	2	2	0	2	0	1	0	5	0
5	(Uzbekistan)	DF	Dilshod Juraev	2	0	1	0	1	0	0	0	2	0
6	(Uzbekistan)	DF	Anvar Gafurov	1	0	1	0	0	0	1	0	3	0
8	(Uzbekistan)	MF	Jovlon Ibrokhimov	3	0	2	0	2	0	1	0	8	0
9	(Japan)	MF	Minori Sato	3	0	0	0	0	0	0	0	3	0
11	(Ukraine)	FW	Oleksandr Pyschur	0	1	1	0	0	0	0	0	1	0
13	(Serbia)	DF	Ivan Milošević	2	0	0	0	0	0	0	0	2	0
14	(Uzbekistan)	MF	Vokhid Shodiev	1	0	0	0	2	0	1	0	3	0
15	(Uzbekistan)	DF	Islom Inomov	2	0	0	0	0	0	0	0	1	0
19	(Uzbekistan)	FW	Zabikhillo Urinboev	2	0	2	1	0	0	0	0	2	1
23	(Uzbekistan)	DF	Sakhob Juraev	2	0	0	0	0	0	0	0	1	0
24	(Uzbekistan)	FW	Bahodir Pardaev	0	0	0	0	1	0	0	0	1	0
27	(Uzbekistan)	DF	Sardor Sabirkhodjaev	0	0	0	0	3	0	0	0	3	0
28	(Uzbekistan)	MF	Dostonbek Khamdamov	2	0	0	0	0	0	0	0	2	0
33	(Uzbekistan)	MF	Oleg Zoteev	5	0	1	0	1	0	0	0	7	0
38	(Uzbekistan)	FW	Timur Ayupov	2	0	0	0	0	0	0	0	1	0
40	(Ukraine)	DF	Serhiy Symonenko	4	0	0	0	2	0	0	0	2	0
45	(Uzbekistan)	GK	Akbar Turaev	1	0	0	0	1	0	0	0	2	0
48	(Uzbekistan)	DF	Akram Komilov	0	0	1	0	1	0	0	0	2	0
59	(Uzbekistan)	MF	Nuriddin Khasanov	1	0	0	0	0	0	0	0	1	0
			TOTALS	50	3	12	1	15	0	4	0	81	4

== Notes ==
1. Bunyodkor played their League home match at JAR Stadium, Tashkent instead of their regular stadium, Bunyodkor Stadium, Tashkent. Only 1st League match they played Pakhtakor Markaziy Stadium
2. Bunyodkor playing their AFC CL home matches at Pakhtakor Markaziy Stadium, Tashkent instead of their regular stadium, Bunyodkor Stadium, Tashkent.
3. Round 13 match planned to be played on 22 June 2014, was rescheduled to 5 July 2014.
