= 2014 Uzbek League =

Uzbek League
- Season: 2014
- Champions: Pakhtakor Tashkent
- Relegated: Sogdiana Jizzakh; Andijan
- Champions League: Pakhtakor Tashkent; Lokomotiv Tashkent; Nasaf; Bunyodkor
- Matches: 182
- Goals: 492 (2.7 per match)

The 2014 Uzbek League was the 23rd season of top-level football in Uzbekistan since independence in 1992. Bunyodkor were the defending champions from the 2013 campaign.

== Teams ==
Location of teams in 2014 Uzbek League

FK Guliston and Shurtan Guzar were relegated in the last edition of the Uzbek League to First League. FK Andijan and Mash'al Mubarek replace them.

Club	Coach	Location	Stadium	Capacity
FK Andijan	(Germany) Edgar Gess	Andijan	Soghlom Avlod Stadium	18,360
Bunyodkor	(Russia) Sergey Lushan	Tashkent	Bunyodkor Stadium	34,000
Bukhoro	(Turkmenistan) Seid Seidov	Bukhoro	Buxoro Arena	22,700
Dinamo	(Uzbekistan) Kamo Gazarov	Samarqand	Dinamo Stadium	16,000
Lokomotiv	(Uzbekistan) Vadim Abramov	Tashkent	Lokomotiv Stadium	8,000
Mash'al	(Uzbekistan) Alexander Khomyakov	Muborak	Bahrom Vafoev Stadium	10,000
Metallurg	(Uzbekistan) Rustam Mirsodiqov	Bekabad	Metallurg Stadium	15,000
Nasaf Qarshi	(Uzbekistan) Ruziqul Berdiev	Qarshi	Qarshi Stadium	14,750
Navbahor	(Uzbekistan) Bakhtiyor Ashurmatov	Namangan	Navbahor Stadium	22,000
Neftchi	(Uzbekistan) Murod Ismoilov	Farghona	Kirguli SM	
Olmaliq FK	(Uzbekistan) Igor Shkvyrin	Olmaliq	Olmaliq SM Stadium	12,000
Pakhtakor	(Uzbekistan) Samvel Babayan	Tashkent	Pakhtakor Stadium	35,000
Qizilqum	(Uzbekistan) Yuriy Lukin	Zarafshon	Yoshlar Stadium	12,500
Sogdiana	(Uzbekistan) Davron Fayziev	Jizzakh	Zaamin Stadium	4,000

=== Managerial changes ===
Team	Outgoing manager	Manner of departure	Replaced by	Position in table	Date of appointment
Bukhoro	(Turkmenistan) Tachmurad Agamuradov	Resigned	(Germany) Edgar Gess	Pre-season	10 November 2013
Neftchi Farg'ona	(Uzbekistan) Evgeniy Shokhin	Resigned	(Uzbekistan) Murod Ismoilov	Pre-season	3 January 2014
Pakhtakor	(Uzbekistan) Murod Ismoilov	Resigned	(Uzbekistan) Samvel Babayan	Pre-season	3 January 2014
Navbahor Namangan	(Uzbekistan) Usmon Asqaraliev	Resigned	(Uzbekistan) Bakhtiyor Ashurmatov	Pre-season	10 January 2014
Lokomotiv Tashkent	(Tajikistan) Khakim Fuzailov	Sacked	(Uzbekistan) Vadim Abramov	Pre-season	13 February 2014
Bunyodkor	(Uzbekistan) Mirjalol Qosimov	Resigned	(Uzbekistan) Alexander Volkov	2nd	5 April 2014
Bunyodkor	(Uzbekistan) Alexander Volkov	End of caretaker spell	(Russia) Sergey Lushan	3rd	6 June 2014
Andijan	(Uzbekistan) Azamat Abduraimov	Resigned	(Uzbekistan) Orif Mamatkazin	14th	20 June 2014
Samarqand-Dinamo	(Uzbekistan) Ravshan Khaydarov	Resigned	(Uzbekistan) Kamo Gazarov	11th	2 July 2014
Bukhoro	(Germany) Edgar Gess	Sacked	(Turkmenistan) Seid Seidov	12th	23 August 2014
FK Andijan	(Uzbekistan) Orif Mamatkazin	End of caretaker spell	(Germany) Edgar Gess	14th	26 September 2014

== Foreign players ==
Club	Player 1	Player 2	Player 3	Asian Player	Former Players
Andijan	(Ukraine) Vitaliy Vizaver				(Moldova) Alexei Casian (Ukraine) Serhiy Datsenko (Ukraine) Viktor Raskov
Bunyodkor	(Bosnia and Herzegovina) Samir Bekrić	(Serbia) Ivan Milošević	(Ukraine) Oleksandr Pyshchur	(Japan) Minori Sato	(Spain) Carles Coto (Ukraine) Serhiy Symonenko
Bukhoro	(Moldova) Dumitru Popovici	(Moldova) Vitalie Plămădeală	(Serbia) Predrag Vujović		(Georgia (country)) Giorgi Kvesieshvili
Dinamo	(Ukraine) Andriy Melnychuk				
Lokomotiv					(Moldova) Andrei Cojocari (Russia) Evgeny Gogol (Tajikistan) Akmal Kholmatov (Ukraine) Vyacheslav Shevchenko
Mash'al	(Ukraine) Andriy Derkach				
Metallurg	(Russia) Aleksandr Kovalev				
Nasaf Qarshi				(Turkmenistan) Artur Gevorkýan	
Navbahor	(Belarus) Yury Ryzhko	(Bulgaria) Petar Denchev	(Ukraine) Ruslan Kachur		
Neftchi	(Moldova) Alexandru Onica	(Serbia) Igor Petković		(Tajikistan) Akmal Kholmatov	(Georgia (country)) Levan Gvazava
Olmaliq FK	(Russia) Evgeny Gogol	(Serbia) Darko Stanojević	(Tunisia) Chaker Zouaghi	(Australia) Petar Franjic	(Serbia) Aleksandar Alempijević (Turkmenistan) Maksatmyrat Shamuradov
Pakhtakor	(Georgia (country)) Kakhi Makharadze	(Serbia) Bojan Miladinović			
Qizilqum	(Georgia (country)) Giorgi Kvesieshvili				
Sogdiana	(Moldova) Alexandru Melenciuc	(Ukraine) Oleksandr Kablash			

== League table ==
Pos	Team	Pld	W	D	L	GF	GA	GD	Pts	Qualification or relegation
1	Pakhtakor Tashkent (C)	26	23	3	0	54	14	+40	72	2015 AFC Champions League group stage (Note: Number of entrants per association for 2015 AFC Champions League can be changed.)
2	Lokomotiv Tashkent	26	20	4	2	58	21	+37	64	2015 AFC Champions League group stage
3	Nasaf Qarshi	26	16	7	3	45	21	+24	55	2015 AFC Champions League group stage
4	Bunyodkor	26	15	6	5	44	20	+24	51	2015 AFC Champions League Third qualifying round
5	Mash'al Mubarek	26	10	6	10	37	42	−5	36	
6	Olmaliq FK	26	8	7	11	33	38	−5	31	
7	Navbahor Namangan	26	9	3	14	38	40	−2	30	
8	Neftchi Farg'ona	26	7	7	12	19	26	−7	28	
9	Metallurg Bekabad	26	8	4	14	44	54	−10	28	
10	FK Samarqand-Dinamo	26	8	4	14	25	39	−14	28	
11	Qizilqum Zarafshon	26	7	6	13	23	34	−11	27	
12	FK Buxoro	26	6	7	13	22	42	−20	25	
13	Sogdiana Jizzakh (R)	26	7	3	16	32	49	−17	24	Relegation to Lower Division
14	FK Andijan (R)	26	3	3	20	18	50	−32	12	Relegation to Lower Division

Updated to match(es) played on 7 November 2014. Source: Uzbekistan Professional Football League
Rules for classification: 1) points; 2) goal difference; 3) number of goals scored.
(C) Champions; (R) Relegated

== Season statistics ==
=== Top goalscorers ===
#	Scorer	Team	Goals (Pen.)
1	(Turkmenistan) Artur Gevorkyan	Nasaf Qarshi	18 (5)
2	(Uzbekistan) Zokhir Kuziboyev	Mash'al Mubarek	14 (1)
2	(Uzbekistan) Shakhboz Erkinov	Navbahor Namangan	14 (3)
4	(Uzbekistan) Farhod Tojiyev	Lokomotiv Tashkent	13 (2)
5	(Uzbekistan) Igor Sergeev	Pakhtakor	11 (0)
6	(Uzbekistan) Sardor Rashidov	Bunyodkor	10 (0)
7	(Uzbekistan) Sunatilla Mamadaliyev	Metallurg Bekabad	8 (0)
7	(Uzbekistan) Shahzodbek Nurmatov	Metallurg Bekabad	8 (0)
7	(Uzbekistan) Ivan Nagaev	Lokomotiv Tashkent	8 (0)

Last updated: 7 November 2014
Source: Soccerway

=== Hat–tricks ===
Player	Team	Against	Result	Date
(Uzbekistan) Shakhboz Erkinov	Navbahor	Sogdiana Jizzakh	4–2	26 April 2014
(Turkmenistan) Artur Gevorkyan	Nasaf Qarshi	Mash'al Mubarek	4–2	14 June 2014
(Ukraine) Ruslan Kachur^{4}	Navbahor	FK Buxoro	4–1	10 August 2014
(Uzbekistan) Sardor Rashidov	Bunyodkor	Mash'al Mubarek	5–1	10 August 2014
(Uzbekistan) Shakhboz Erkinov	Sogdiana Jizzakh	Navbahor	5–4	12 September 2014

^{4} Player scored four goals

== Awards ==
=== Monthly awards ===
Month	Manager of the Month		Player of the Month		Reference
Month	Manager	Club	Player	Club	Reference
March; April	(Uzbekistan) Samvel Babayan	Pakhtakor	(Uzbekistan) Egor Krimets	Pakhtakor	
May	(Uzbekistan) Vadim Abramov	Lokomotiv	(Uzbekistan) Jamshid Iskanderov	Pakhtakor	
June; July	(Uzbekistan) Samvel Babayan	Pakhtakor	(Uzbekistan) Akmal Rustamov	Qizilqum	
August	(Russia) Sergey Lushan	Bunyodkor	(Uzbekistan) Sardor Rashidov	Bunyodkor	
September	(Uzbekistan) Ruziqul Berdiev	Nasaf	(Turkmenistan) Artur Gevorkyan	Nasaf	
October	(Uzbekistan) Samvel Babayan	Pakhtakor	(Uzbekistan) Jamshid Iskanderov	Pakhtakor	
November	(Uzbekistan) Samvel Babayan	Pakhtakor	(Uzbekistan) Igor Sergeev	Pakhtakor	
