= Dostonbek Khamdamov =

Uzbekistani footballer (born 1996)

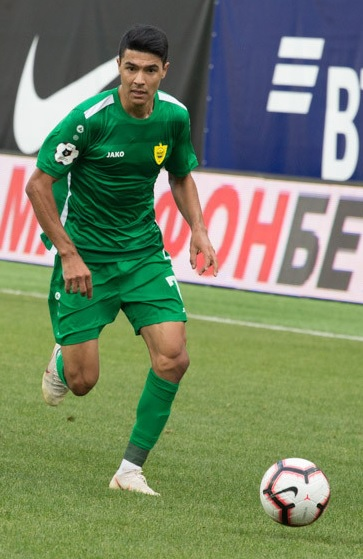
- Khamdamov with Anzhi Makhachkala in 2018

Personal information
- Full name: Dostonbek Khurshid o'g'li Khamdamov
- Date of birth: 24 July 1996 (age 30)
- Place of birth: Bekabad, Uzbekistan
- Height: 1.78 m (5 ft 10 in)
- Position: Winger

Team information
- Current team: Pakhtakor
- Number: 17

Senior career*
Years	Team	Apps	(Gls)
2014–2018	Bunyodkor	93	(37)
2018–2019	Anzhi Makhachkala	9	(0)
2019–2020	Pakhtakor	48	(16)
2021	Al-Nasr	2	(0)
2021	→ Hatta (loan)	10	(0)
2021–	Pakhtakor	115	(20)
2022	→ Al-Sailiya (loan)	7	(1)

International career^{‡}
2013	Uzbekistan U17	4	(0)
2014	Uzbekistan U19	5	(1)
2014–2015	Uzbekistan U20	4	(3)
2015–2018	Uzbekistan U23	12	(4)
2015–	Uzbekistan	35	(5)
Medal record
Representing Uzbekistan
Men's football
AFC U-16 Championship
Gold medal – first place	2012 Iran	Team
AFC U-19 Championship
Bronze medal – third place	2014 Myanmar	Team
AFC U-23 Championship
Gold medal – first place	2018 China	Team
- * Club domestic league appearances and goals as of 28 July 2026 ‡ National team caps and goals as of 12:34, 28 June 2023 (UTC)

Dostonbek Khurshidovich Khamdamov (Uzbek: Dostonbek Xurshid oʻgʻli Xamdamov, Достонбек Хуршид ўғли Хамдамов; born 24 July 1996) is an Uzbek professional footballer who plays as a winger for Pakhtakor and the Uzbekistan national team.

In 2015, he won Asian Young Footballer of the Year. In 2018, he won the 2018 AFC U-23 Championship with Uzbekistan.

== Club career ==
On 15 March 2018, Khamdamov was registered by Russian Premier League club Anzhi Makhachkala, taking the #7 jersey after signing an 18-month contract. On 15 February 2019, Anzhi Makhachkala announced that Khamdamov had left the club to join Pakhtakor Tashkent.

Khamdamov was released by Pakhtakor Tashkent on 13 January 2021. On 23 July 2021, Khamdamov returned to Pakhtakor Tashkent, signing a contract until the end of 2022. On 22 January 2022, Pakhtakor announced that Khamdamov had signed for Al-Sailiya on loan until 30 June 2022.

== International career ==
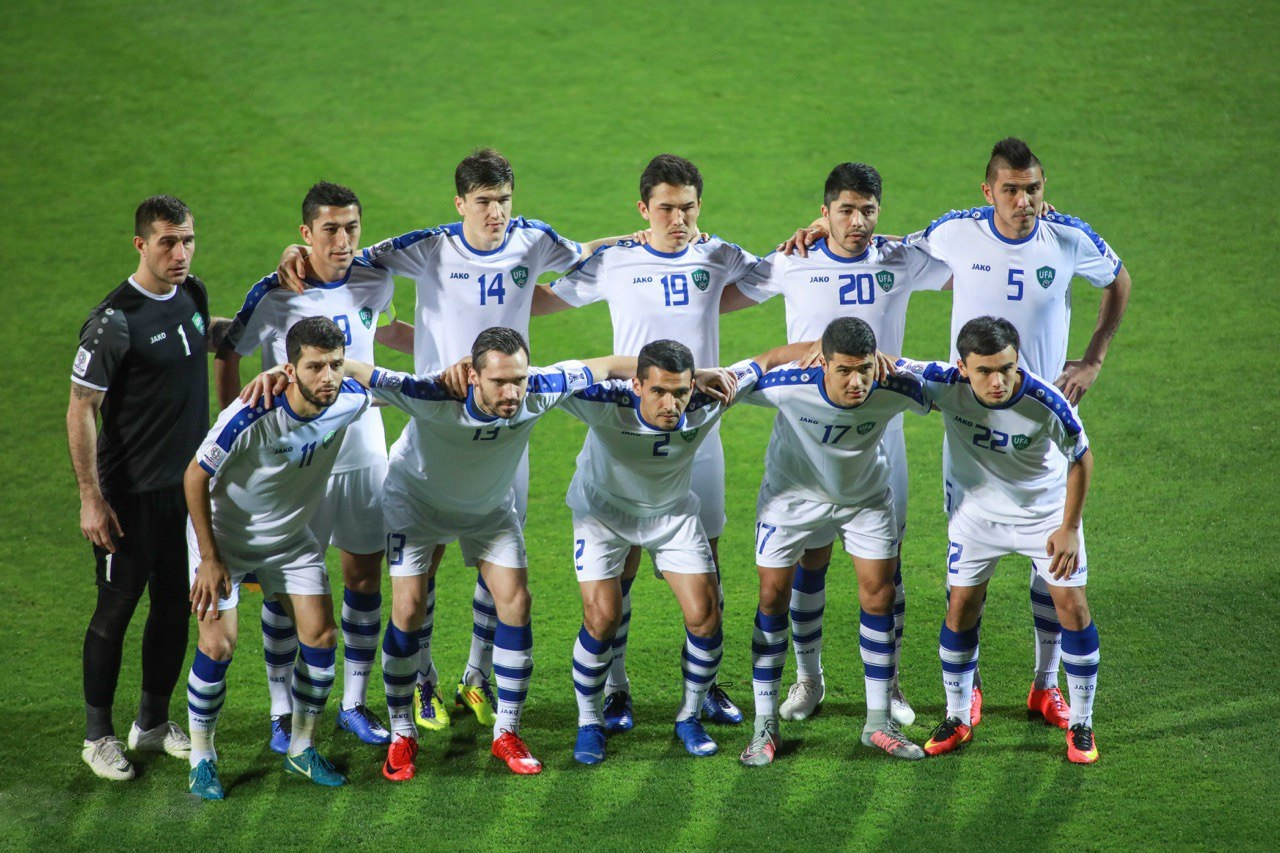
Khamdamov (№17) at 2019 Asian Cup

Khamdamov was part of the U-19 squad when they finished in the semi-finals of the 2014 AFC U-19 Championship, where Khamdamov scored one goal only. After that match, Khamdamov would go on to make an outstanding performance in the 2015 FIFA U-20 World Cup, where he scored three goals and produced a magnificent performance as Uzbekistan ran into the quarter-finals before bowing to Senegal. For this performance, he became the first Uzbek player to be nominated as the Asian Young Footballer of the Year.

He participated in the 2016 AFC U-23 Championship and scored two goals, but his team went out from the group stage. Two years later, he would lead Uzbekistan to conquer the country's first-ever U-23 trophy. For this successful display, Khamdamov earned a place and would go to be part of the senior squad for the 2019 AFC Asian Cup.

On 2 June 2026, he was included in the 26-man squad selected by head coach Fabio Cannavaro for the 2026 FIFA World Cup, marking the country's first-ever appearance in the tournament.

== Career statistics ==
=== Club ===
As of match played 4 December 2021

Club	Season	League			National Cup		League Cup		Continental		Other		Total	
Club	Season	Division	Apps	Goals	Apps	Goals	Apps	Goals	Apps	Goals	Apps	Goals	Apps	Goals
Bunyodkor	2014	Uzbekistan Super League	8	4	3	0	–		0	0	0	0	11	4
Bunyodkor	2015	Uzbekistan Super League	26	10	6	4	–		6	0	0	0	38	14
Bunyodkor	2016	Uzbekistan Super League	29	9	5	1	–		7	2	0	0	41	12
Bunyodkor	2017	Uzbekistan Super League	30	14	7	4	–		7	1	-		44	19
Bunyodkor	Total		93	37	21	9	-	-	20	3	0	0	134	49
Anzhi Makhachkala	2017–18	Russian Premier League	4	0	0	0	–		–		0	0	4	0
Anzhi Makhachkala	2018–19	Russian Premier League	5	0	2	0	–		–		–		7	0
Anzhi Makhachkala	Total		9	0	2	0	-	-	-	-	0	0	11	0
Pakhtakor Tashkent	2019	Uzbekistan Super League	22	7	4	1	3	5	7	0	–		36	13
Pakhtakor Tashkent	2020	Uzbekistan Super League	26	9	4	2	–		8	0	–		38	11
Pakhtakor Tashkent	Total		48	16	8	3	3	5	15	0	-	-	74	24
Al-Nasr	2020–21	UAE Pro League	2	0	0	0	1	0	–		–		3	0
Hatta (loan)	2020–21	UAE Pro League	10	0	0	0	0	0	–		–		10	0
Pakhtakor Tashkent	2021	Uzbekistan Super League	12	0	4	0	–		0	0	0	0	16	0
Pakhtakor Tashkent	2022	Uzbekistan Super League	0	0	0	0	–		0	0	–		0	0
Pakhtakor Tashkent	Total		12	0	4	0	-	-	0	0	0	0	16	0
Al-Sailiya (loan)	2021–22	Qatar Stars League	0	0	0	0	–		–		–		0	0
Career total			174	53	35	12	4	5	35	3	0	0	248	73

=== International ===
Uzbekistan national team
Year	Apps	Goals
2016	2	0
2017	1	0
2018	4	0
2019	13	1
2019	3	1
Total	23	2

Statistics accurate as of match played 17 November 2020

== International goals ==
=== Uzbekistan U23 ===
No.	Date	Venue	Opponent	Score	Result	Competition
1.	19 January 2018	Jiangyin Stadium, Jiangyin, China	Japan	2–0	4–0	2018 AFC U-23 Championship
2.	14 August 2018	Pakansari Stadium, Cibinong, Indonesia	Bangladesh	2–0	3–0	2018 Asian Games
3.	16 August 2018	Pakansari Stadium, Cibinong, Indonesia	Qatar	3–0	6–0	2018 Asian Games

=== Uzbekistan ===
Scores and results list Uzbekistan's goal tally first.

No.	Date	Venue	Opponent	Score	Result	Competition
1	9 November 2019	Pakhtakor Central Stadium, Tashkent, Uzbekistan	Kyrgyzstan	2–1	3–1	Friendly
2	17 November 2020	The Sevens Stadium, Dubai, United Arab Emirates	Iraq	1–0	2–1	Friendly
3	9 October 2021	Amman International Stadium, Amman, Jordan	Malaysia	1–0	5–1	Friendly
4	9 October 2021	Amman International Stadium, Amman, Jordan	Malaysia	2–0	5–1	Friendly
5	8 June 2022	Markaziy Stadium, Namangan, Uzbekistan	Sri Lanka	2–0	3–0	2023 AFC Asian Cup qualification

== Honours ==
=== Club ===
Bunyodkor

- Uzbekistan Super Cup: 2014

=== International ===
Uzbekistan U-23

- AFC U-23 Championship (1): 2018

Uzbekistan U-16

- AFC U-16 Championship (1): 2012

=== Individual ===
- Asian Young Footballer of the Year: 2015
