= Islom Inomov =

Uzbekistani association football player

Personal information
- Date of birth: 30 May 1984 (age 42)
- Place of birth: Angren, Uzbek SSR, Soviet Union
- Height: 1.78 m (5 ft 10 in)
- Position: Full back

Team information
- Current team: Olmaliq FK

Senior career*
Years	Team	Apps	(Gls)
2001	Semurg Angren	11	(0)
2001–2003	FK Buxoro	62	(4)
2004	Pakhtakor	16	(2)
2005	Navbahor Namangan	9	(2)
2005–2006	Lokomotivi Tbilisi	14	(0)
2006–2009	Pakhtakor		
2009–2010	FK Andijan		
2010	Nasaf Qarshi	7	(0)
2010	Liaoning Whowin	13	(0)
2011	Bunyodkor	15	(0)
2012–2013	Lokomotiv Tashkent	46	(1)
2014	Bunyodkor	12	(0)
2015	Olmaliq FK		

International career^{‡}
2004–	Uzbekistan	37	(2)
- * Club domestic league appearances and goals as of 17 February 2015 ‡ National team caps and goals as of 6 September 2013

Islom Inomov (born 30 May 1984) is an Uzbekistani football player (defender) who most recently played for Olmaliq FK.

== Career ==
He started his career at FK Buxoro. Until 2004 he played for Pakhtakor when, for the 2004 league season, he signed for Navbahor Namangan. Inomov and is also a member of the Uzbekistan national football team. He was called up for 2010 FIFA World Cup qualification (AFC) games and participated in the 2007 AFC Asian Cup.

In 2012–13 he played for Lokomotiv Tashkent. On 14 March 2014 he signed a contract with Bunyodkor

In February 2015 he moved to Olmaliq FK, signing a one-year contract with that club.

== Honors ==
Pakhtakor

- Uzbek League (3): 2004, 2006, 2007
- Uzbek Cup (4): 2004, 2006, 2007, 2008

Bunyodkor

- Uzbek League (1): 2011

Lokomotiv

- Uzbek League runner-up (1): 2013
- Uzbek Super Cup runner-up (1): 2013

== Career statistics ==
=== Club ===
As of 9 November 2013

Club	Season	League		Cup		AFC		Total	
Club	Season	Apps	Goals	Apps	Goals	Apps	Goals	Apps	Goals
Nasaf Qarshi	2010	7	0	-	-	6	0	13	0
Liaoning Whowin	2010	13	0	-				13	0
Bunyodkor	2011	15	0	5	0	2	0	22	0
Lokomotiv Tashkent	2012	22	1	3	1	-		25	2
Lokomotiv Tashkent	2013	24	0	3	0	1	0	28	0
Lokomotiv Tashkent	Total	46	1	6	1	1	0	53	2
Bunyodkor	2014	12	0	2	0	-		14	0
Career total		93	1	13	1	9	0	115	2

=== International ===
Goals for Senior National Team

#	Date	Venue	Opponent	Score	Result	Competition
1.	28 October 2007	Taipei, Taiwan	Chinese Taipei	1–0	3–0	2010 FIFA World Cup qualification
2.	22 March 2008	Tashkent	Jordan	2–0	4–1	Friendly
Correct as of 6 September 2013
