= Dilshod Juraev =

Uzbekistani footballer

Personal information
- Date of birth: 21 April 1992 (age 34)
- Place of birth: Tashkent, Uzbekistan
- Height: 1.86 m (6 ft 1 in)
- Position: Defensive midfielder

Team information
- Current team: Khorazm
- Number: 5

Senior career*
Years	Team	Apps	(Gls)
2011–2015	Bunyodkor	51	(2)
2012	→ Dinamo Samarqand (loan)	8	(0)
2016	Olmaliq	5	(0)
2016	Andijon	13	(2)
2017–2018	AGMK	34	(3)
2018	Bunyodkor	17	(1)
2019–2022	AGMK	57	(5)
2022	Bunyodkor	11	(1)
2022	Qizilqum Zarafshon	9	(2)
2023	Bukhara	20	(1)
2024	Lokomotiv Tashkent	7	(0)
2025–	Khorazm	14	(0)

International career
2012–	Uzbekistan	2	(1)
- * Club domestic league appearances and goals as of 11 August 2025

Dilshod Juraev (born 21 April 1992) is an Uzbekistani professional footballer who plays as a defensive midfielder for Uzbekistan Super League club Khorazm, and the Uzbekistan national team.

== International career ==
He was called up for 2015 AFC Asian Cup qualification match on 15 November 2013 against Vietnam.

=== International goals ===
Scores and results list Uzbekistan's goal tally first.

No	Date	Venue	Opponent	Score	Result	Competition
1.	4 September 2014	Stadion Majmuasi, Tashkent, Uzbekistan	Jordan	2–0	2–0	Friendly

== Honors ==
Bunyodkor

- Uzbek League: 2011, 2013
- Uzbek Cup: 2012, 2013
- Uzbekistan Super Cup: 2014
