= Sardor Rashidov =

Uzbek footballer (born 1992)

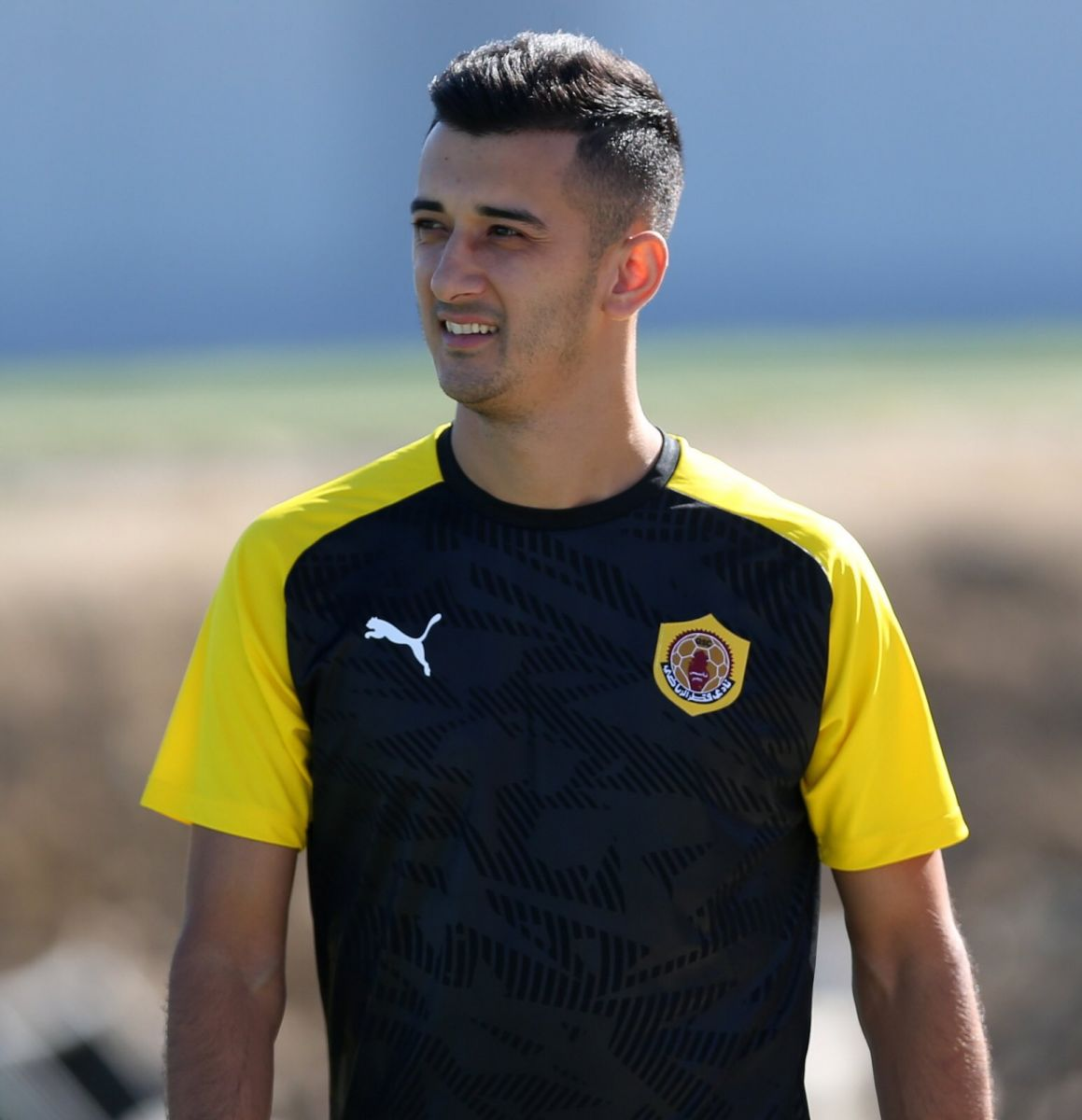
- Rashidov with Qatar SC in 2020

Personal information
- Full name: Sardor Ikhtiyorovich Rashidov
- Date of birth: 14 June 1991 (age 35)
- Place of birth: Jizzakh, Uzbek SSR, Soviet Union
- Height: 1.84 m (6 ft 0 in)
- Position: Winger

Team information
- Current team: Machhindra

Senior career*
Years	Team	Apps	(Gls)
2007–2008	Sogdiana Jizzakh	3	(0)
2009–2015	FC Bunyodkor	78	(22)
2015–2017	El Jaish	48	(23)
2017	Al Jazira	8	(0)
2018	Lokomotiv Tashkent	23	(8)
2019	Nacional	7	(3)
2019–2020	Qatar SC	24	(6)
2021	Pakhtakor	5	(2)
2021	Kuwait SC	0	(0)
2022	Pakhtakor	7	(1)
2022–2023	Umm Salal	7	(0)
2023–2024	Pakhtakor	4	(0)
2024	Dubai City		
2024–25	Navbahor	2	(0)
2025–26	Dubai City	0	(0)
2026–	Machhindra	0	(0)

International career^{‡}
2013–	Uzbekistan	50	(13)
- * Club domestic league appearances and goals as of 31 January 2026 ‡ National team caps and goals as of 31 January, 2026

Sardor Ikhtiyorovich Rashidov (Uzbek Cyrillic: Сардор Ихтиёрович Рашидов; born 14 June 1991) is an Uzbek professional footballer who plays as a winger for Machhindra and the Uzbekistan national team.

== Club career ==
Born in Jizzakh, Rashidov began his career with hometown club Sogdiana Jizak before joining FC Bunyodkor in 2009. In his time at the latter club, he won the Uzbek League and Uzbek Cup three times each, as well as winning an Uzbekistan Super Cup and a semi-final finish in the 2012 AFC Champions League.

On 6 July 2015, he moved abroad for the first time to sign a three-year deal with El Jaish SC of the Qatar Stars League. Two years later, following the merger of his club into Al-Duhail SC, he moved on a free transfer to UAE Pro-League side Al Jazira Club, replacing Park Jong-woo as their permitted Asian foreign player.

In his time in Abu Dhabi, Rashidov was not frequently picked by manager Henk ten Cate, and on 4 February 2018 he returned home to Lokomotiv Tashkent. He made his debut eight days later in a home Champions League group match against Al Wahda FC, coming on as a first-half substitute for Nivaldo and scoring in a 5–0 win.

Rashidov left Asia for the first time on 16 January 2019, signing a two-and-a-half-year deal with C.D. Nacional of Portugal's Primeira Liga. He played seven games for the team from Madeira and scored three times, all of which in a 4–0 home win over C.D. Feirense on 16 February. In the following game, against fellow Atlantic islanders C.D. Santa Clara, he did not make the trip after suffering two panic attacks ahead of the flight.

In July 2019, Rashidov rescinded his Nacional contract following their relegation, and signed for Qatar SC.

=== Kuwait SC ===
On 17 July 2021, Kuwait SC announced the signing of Rashidov for one season from Pakhtakor Tashkent.

=== Return to Pakhtakor ===
On 31 January 2022, Pakhtakor Tashkent announced the signing of Rashidov to a one-year contract on a free transfer from Kuwait SC.

=== Umm Salal ===
On 24 June 2022, Pakhtakor Tashkent announced that Rashidov had signed for Umm Salal.

== International career ==
Rashidov made his debut for the Uzbekistan national football team on 15 October 2013 in a 2015 AFC Asian Cup qualification match at home to Vietnam, and scored the opening goal of a 3–1 win in Tashkent. Coach Mirjalol Qosimov called him up for the final tournament in Australia, where he scored twice in a 3–1 win over Saudi Arabia to advance to the quarter-finals. He was also included for the 2019 edition in the United Arab Emirates.

== Career statistics ==
=== Club ===
As of 21 October 2016

Club	Season	League		Cup		AFC		Other		Total	
Club	Season	Apps	Goals	Apps	Goals	Apps	Goals	Apps	Goals	Apps	Goals
Bunyodkor	2010	1	0	2	0	0	0	-		3	0
Bunyodkor	2011	0	0	0	0	0	0	-		0	0
Bunyodkor	2012	0	0	0	0	0	0	-		0	0
Bunyodkor	2013	14	3	3	0	3	0	-		20	3
Bunyodkor	2014	21	10	5	4	7	1	1	0	34	15
Bunyodkor	2015	13	5	1	0	6	1	-		18	6
El Jaish SC	2015	23	9	0	0	0	0	-		23	9
Career total		49	18	8	4	11	2	1	0	74	19

=== International ===
Scores and results list Uzbekistan's goal tally first.

#	Date	Venue	Opponent	Score	Result	Competition
1.	15 October 2013	Pakhtakor Markaziy Stadium, Tashkent, Uzbekistan	Vietnam	1–0	3–1	2015 AFC Asian Cup qualification
2.	15 November 2013	Mỹ Đình National Stadium, Hanoi, Vietnam	Vietnam	3–0	3–0	2015 AFC Asian Cup qualification
3.	13 December 2014	Maktoum Bin Rashid Al Maktoum Stadium, Dubai, United Arab Emirates	Palestine	1–0	1–0	Friendly
4.	21 December 2014	Al-Rashid Stadium, Dubai, United Arab Emirates	Jordan	1–1	2–1	Friendly
5.	18 January 2015	Melbourne Rectangular Stadium, Melbourne, Australia	Saudi Arabia	1–0	3–1	2015 AFC Asian Cup
6.	18 January 2015	Melbourne Rectangular Stadium, Melbourne, Australia	Saudi Arabia	3–1	3–1	2015 AFC Asian Cup
7.	16 June 2015	Kim Il-sung Stadium, Pyongyang, North Korea	North Korea	2–4	2–4	2018 FIFA World Cup qualification
8.	8 September 2015	Philippine Sports Stadium, Bocaue, Philippines	Philippines	2–0	5–1	2018 FIFA World Cup qualification
9.	8 September 2015	Philippine Sports Stadium, Bocaue, Philippines	Philippines	5–1	5–1	2018 FIFA World Cup qualification
10	8 October 2015	Bahrain National Stadium, Riffa, Bahrain	Bahrain	3–0	4–0	2018 FIFA World Cup qualification
11	29 March 2016	Bunyodkor Stadium, Tashkent, Uzbekistan	Bahrain	1–0	1–0	2018 FIFA World Cup qualification
12.	6 June 2017	Bunyodkor Stadium, Tashkent, Uzbekistan	Thailand	2–0	2–0	Friendly

== Honours ==
Bunyodkor

- Uzbek League: 2010, 2011, 2013
- Uzbek Cup: 2010, 2012, 2013
- Uzbekistan Super Cup: 2014

Lokomotiv

- Uzbekistan Super League: 2018

Individual

- Uzbekistan Player of the Year 2nd: 2015
