= Alibobo Rakhmatullaev =

Uzbek footballer (born 1991)

Personal information
- Full name: Alibobo Rakhmatullaev
- Date of birth: 8 February 1991 (age 35)
- Place of birth: Tashkent, Uzbekistan
- Height: 1.84 m (6 ft 0 in)
- Position: Wide midfielder

Team information
- Current team: Kyran Shymkent
- Number: 7

Senior career*
Years	Team	Apps	(Gls)
2008–2011	Bunyodkor-2		
2012–2014	Bunyodkor	32	(1)
2015	Bukhoro	5	(0)
2015	Navbahor Namangan	4	(0)
2015	Ravan	4	(0)
2016	Navbahor Namangan	10	(0)
2016	Andijon	11	(0)
2017	Olmaliq	10	(0)
2018–	Kyran Shymkent	64	(12)

International career^{‡}
2010	Uzbekistan U-19		
2012–	Uzbekistan	2	(0)
- * Club domestic league appearances and goals as of 23 November 2023 ‡ National team caps and goals as of 24 February 2013

Alibobo Rakhmatullaev (Uzbek: Алибобо Раҳматуллаев; born 8 February 1991) is an Uzbek footballer who plays as midfielder for Kyran Shymkent.

== Career ==
He has played for a Bunyodkor team since 2008. From 2009 to 2011 he played for Bunyodkor-2. He started playing for Bunyodkor in 2012. In the 2012 AFC Champions League quarter-final second leg match against Adelaide United he scored Bunyodkor's third goal in overtime which qualified his team to advance to the semifinal of tournament. In February 2015 he moved to FK Buxoro.

== Honours ==
- Uzbek League (1): 2013
- Uzbek League runner-up (1): 2012
- Uzbek Cup (2): 2012, 2013
- Uzbekistan Supercup (1): 2013
