= Artur Gevorkýan =

Turkmen footballer

Artur Gevorkyan
Personal information
- Full name: Artur Aleksandrowiç Geworkýan
- Date of birth: 22 November 1984 (age 41)
- Place of birth: Ashgabat, Soviet Union
- Height: 1.75 m (5 ft 9 in)
- Position: Forward

Youth career
- Nisa Aşgabat

Senior career*
Years	Team	Apps	(Gls)
2003–2004	Şagadam	17	(2)
2005	Esil-Bogatyr	12	(1)
2006	Aşgabat	23	(8)
2006–2009	Shurtan Guzar	95	(24)
2010	Pakhtakor Tashkent	22	(2)
2011–2016	Nasaf Qarshi	140	(64)
2016	Lokomotiv Tashkent	14	(1)
2017–2018	Qizilqum Zarafshon	58	(14)
2019	Ahal	1	(0)
2019	Persib Bandung	9	(3)
2020–2022	Ahal	0	(0)
Total		391	(119)

International career
2007–2019	Turkmenistan	19	(3)
- * Club domestic league appearances and goals

Artur Aleksandrowiç Geworkýan (born 22 November 1984) is a Turkmen former footballer who plays as a forward.

== Club career ==
Of Armenian origin, Geworkýan was born in Ashgabat, the capital of Turkmen SSR. From 2011 to 2016, Gevorkyan played for Nasaf Qarshi. Before joining Nasaf he played for Pakhtakor Tashkent. In 2011, Gevorkyan won 2011 AFC Cup with Nasaf, scoring 4 goals in the tournament and 11 goals in League matches.

In the 2013 season, Gevorkyan scored 18 goals, only one goal less than the best scorer Oleksandr Pyschur. He was named on 2014 Uzbekistan Football award ceremony the UzPFL Player of the Year. He was named four times UzPFL Player of the Month in the 2013 season. Gevorkyan became the league's best goalscorer in 2014, scoring 18 goals in League matches. In 2015, he won with Nasaf his first Uzbek Cup, scoring in the final match against Bunyodkor on 17 October 2015 first goal of Nasaf. On 17 February 2016 in the Uzbekistan Super Cup match against the current champion Pakhtakor, Gevorkyan scored in the 40th minute the only goal of the match, securing victory for his club. He made significant contribution to the club's Cup victories in 2015.

On 4 March 2016, he was announced by the Uzbekistan Football Federation as the 2015 Uzbek League Player of the Year based on the survey results among sports journalists. It was his second such award.

In March 2019, as a free agent, he moved to the Turkmen FC Ahal, in the Ýokary Liga.

In April 2019 on the rights of a free agent, signed a one-year contract with the football club Persib Bandung from Indonesia. In August 2019, Persib Bandung and Artur Gevorkyan decided to terminate the contract by mutual desire.

== International career ==
He played for Turkmenistan futsal team at 2006 AFC Futsal Championship.

He made his debut for Turkmenistan on 11 October 2007 in the 2010 FIFA World Cup qualification match against Cambodia. In his 2nd match for national team on 28 October 2007, 2nd leg match against Cambodia in Ashgabat ended with 4–1 score, Gevorkyan scored two goals.

== Career statistics ==
=== Club ===
Appearances and goals by club, season and competition
Club	Season	League		Cup		AFC		Total	
Club	Season	Apps	Goals	Apps	Goals	Apps	Goals	Apps	Goals
Shurtan	2006	14	7		0	-		14	7
Shurtan	2007	25	3		1	-		25	4
Shurtan	2008	29	6		2	-		29	8
Shurtan	2009	27	8		2	-		27	10
Shurtan	Total	95	24		5	-		95	29
Pakhtakor	2010	22	2	2	0	6	2	30	4
Pakhtakor	Total	22	2	2	0	6	2	30	4
Nasaf Qarshi	2011	24	6	4	1	11	4	39	11
Nasaf Qarshi	2012	24	9	3	2	4	0	31	11
Nasaf Qarshi	2013	26	18	7	3	-		33	21
Nasaf Qarshi	2014	26	18	5	2	1	0	32	20
Nasaf Qarshi	2015	26	11	4	4	6	3	36	18
Nasaf Qarshi	2016	14	2	3	0	2	0	19	2
Nasaf Qarshi	Total	140	64	28	12	24	7	192	83
Pakhtakor	2016	14	1	0	0	0	0	14	1
Pakhtakor	Total	14	1	0	0	0	0	14	1
Qizilqum Zarafshon	2017	20	4	1	0	-		21	4
Qizilqum Zarafshon	Total	20	4	1	0	-		21	4
Career total		277	93	28	17	28	9	333	119

=== International ===
Turkmenistan national team
Year	Apps	Goals
2007	4	2
2008	3	0
2009	1	0
2010	1	0
2011	1	0
2012	0	0
2013	0	0
2014	0	0
2015	5	1
2016	4	0
Total	19	3

Statistics accurate as of match played 9 November 2016

=== International goals ===
#	Date	Venue	Opponent	Score	Result	Competition
1	28 October 2007	Saparmurat Turkmenbashi Olympic Stadium, Ashgabat, Turkmenistan	Cambodia	2–1	4–1	2010 FIFA World Cup qualification
2	28 October 2007	Saparmurat Turkmenbashi Olympic Stadium, Ashgabat, Turkmenistan	Cambodia	3–1	4–1	2010 FIFA World Cup qualification
3	17 November 2015	Köpetdag Stadium, Ashgabat, Turkmenistan	Oman	1–0	2–1	2018 FIFA World Cup qualification

== Honours ==
=== Club ===
Nasaf Qarshi

- Uzbek Cup (1) 2015
- Uzbekistan Super Cup (1) 2015
- Uzbek League runner-up: 2011
- Uzbek Cup runner-up (3): 2011, 2012, 2013
- AFC Cup (1): 2011

Lokomotiv

- Uzbek League (1) 2016
- Uzbek Cup (1) 2016

=== Individual ===
- UzPFL Player of the Month (5): March 2013, June 2013, August 2013, October 2013, September 2014
- Uzbek League Player of Year: 2013, 2015
- Uzbek League Foreign Footballer of the Year (2): 2013, 2014
- Uzbek League Top Scorer: 2014 (18 goals)
- AFC Cup MVP (1): 2011
