= 2014 Uzbekistan Super Cup =

- Event: 2014 Uzbekistan Cup
Lokomotiv Tashkent	Bunyodkor
1	2
- Date: 7 March 2014
- Venue: JAR Stadium, Tashkent
- Referee: Ravshan Irmatov
- Attendance: 4,751
- Weather: 14 °C (57 °F)

The 2014 Uzbekistan Super Cup was the second UzPFL-Supercup. It was contested by the winners and runners up of the 2013 Uzbek League. Bunyodkor had also the won 2013 Uzbekistan Cup. The match was contested by Bunyodkor and Lokomotiv Tashkent, at JAR Stadium in Tashkent, on 7 March 2014. Bunyodkor Tashkent won the match 2:1.

== Match details ==
7 March 2014
15:00 UTC+05:00

Lokomotiv	1 – 2	Bunyodkor
Shevchenko 80'	Report	Pyschur 27'; Shodiev 67'

JAR Stadium, Tashkent
Attendance: 4,751
Referee: Ravshan Irmatov

Lokomotiv	Bunyodkor

Lokomotiv:
GK	1	(Uzbekistan) Ignatiy Nesterov
DF	3	(Russia) Evgeniy Gogol	(yellow card) 15'
DF	4	(Uzbekistan) Boburbek Yuldoshev
DF	19	(Uzbekistan) Islom Inomov	(yellow card) 58'	(substituted off) 71'
MF	8	(Uzbekistan) Akmal Kholmatov		(substituted off) 46'
MF	16	(Uzbekistan) Jasur Hasanov
MF	22	(Uzbekistan) Viktor Karpenko
MF	30	(Uzbekistan) Dilshod Jabborov
MF	88	(Uzbekistan) Lutfulla Turaev	(yellow card) 38'
FW	10	(Uzbekistan) Farhod Tadjiyev		(substituted off) 46'
FW	99	(Ukraine) Vyacheslav Shevchenko
Substitutes:
GK		(Uzbekistan) Temur Juraev
DF	18	(Uzbekistan) Fozil Musaev		(substituted on) 71'
DF	20	(Uzbekistan) Islom Tukhtakhodjaev
MF	77	(Uzbekistan) Jasur O. Hasanov		(substituted on) 46'
MF		(Uzbekistan) Ibrohim Rakhimov
FW	9	(Uzbekistan) Sardor Mirzayev
FW	23	(Uzbekistan) Ivan Nagaev	(yellow card) 77'	(substituted on) 46'
Manager:
(Uzbekistan) Vadim Abramov

Bunyodkor:
GK	25	(Uzbekistan) Murod Zukhurov
DF	2	(Uzbekistan) Akmal Shorakhmedov
DF	4	(Uzbekistan) Hayrulla Karimov	(yellow card) 90+4'
DF	6	(Uzbekistan) Anvar Gafurov	(yellow card) 6'
DF	40	(Ukraine) Serhiy Symonenko
MF	8	(Uzbekistan) Jovlon Ibrokhimov
MF	16	(Spain) Carles Coto		(substituted off) 60'
MF	27	(Uzbekistan) Sardor Sabirkhodjaev
MF	33	(Uzbekistan) Oleg Zoteev		(substituted off) 65'
FW	11	(Ukraine) Oleksandr Pyschur
FW	24	(Uzbekistan) Bahodir Pardaev		(substituted off) 76'
Substitutes:
GK	1	(Uzbekistan) Pavel Bugalo
DF	7	(Uzbekistan) Alibobo Rakhmatullaev		(substituted on) 76'
FW	14	(Uzbekistan) Vokhid Shodiev		(substituted on) 65'
FW	21	(Uzbekistan) Sardor Rashidov		(substituted on) 60'
Manager:
(Uzbekistan) Mirjalol Qosimov

Assistant referees:
Abdukhamidullo Rasulov
Bahadyr Kochkarov
Fourth official:
Aziz Asimov
