= Vokhid Shodiev =

Uzbekistani footballer

Personal information
- Date of birth: 9 November 1986 (age 40)
- Place of birth: Fergana, Uzbekistan
- Height: 1.92 m (6 ft 4 in)
- Position: Forward

Team information
- Current team: Qizilqum Zarafshon
- Number: 14

Senior career*
Years	Team	Apps	(Gls)
2010–2012	Neftchi Farg'ona	24	(0)
2012–2013	Buxoro	51	(17)
2014–2015	Bunyodkor	42	(13)
2016	Perak FA	10	(1)
2016–2017	Qizilqum Zarafshon	27	(7)
2017	Bunyodkor	10	(4)
2018	Mash'al Mubarek		
2019	Dinamo Samarqand	5	(0)
2019–	Qizilqum Zarafshon	6	(0)

International career
2013–	Uzbekistan	14	(3)
- * Club domestic league appearances and goals as of 20:16, 13 October 2019 (UTC)

Vokhid Shodiev (born 9 November 1986) is an Uzbek professional footballer who plays as a forward for FC Qizilqum Zarafshon.

== Career ==
Shodiev in 2010–11 played for Neftchi Farg'ona. Since 2012 he plays for FK Buxoro. In 2013 season with 12 goals scored he was one of the top scorers of Uzbek League. On 6 November 2013 he was called up for Uzbekistan match of 2015 AFC Asian Cup qualification on 15 November 2013 against Vietnam.

His national team debut and goal was against Vietnam, 15 November 2013. His second goal came in his next match on 19 November 2013 at 2015 AFC Asian Cup qualification against Hong Kong.

On 10 December 2013, he signed a two-year contract with Bunyodkor. He played his first official and international match for Bunyodkor on 25 February 2014 in AFC Champions League match against Al-Fateh. On 7 March 2014, he scored his first goal in official matches for the club in UzPFL Super Cup match against Lokomotiv Tashkent.

He signed with Perak FA on 30 December 2015. He was released in June 2016 having scored 1 goal in 10 league matches.

On 26 July 2017, Shodiev re-signed for FC Bunyodkor.

== Career statistics ==
=== Club ===
As of 20 November 2015

Appearances and goals by club, season and competition
Club	Season	League		Cup		AFC		Total	
Club	Season	Apps	Goals	Apps	Goals	Apps	Goals	Apps	Goals
Neftchi Farg'ona	2010	15	0	2	1	–		17	1
Neftchi Farg'ona	2011	9	0	3	1	–		12	1
Neftchi Farg'ona	Total	24	0	5	2	–		29	2
FK Buxoro	2012	25	5	6	0	–		31	5
FK Buxoro	2013	26	12	0	0	–		26	12
FK Buxoro	Total	51	17	6	0	–		57	17
Bunyodkor	2014	20	6	5	3	7	2	32	11
Bunyodkor	2015	22	7	5	1	6	1	6	3
Bunyodkor	Total	42	13	10	4	13	3	65	20
Career total		117	30	21	6	13	3	151	39

=== International ===
Goals for Senior National Team

#	Date	Venue	Opponent	Score	Result	Competition
1.	15 November 2013	Hanoi, Vietnam	Vietnam	1–0	3–0	2015 AFC Asian Cup qualification
2.	19 November 2013	Hong Kong	Hong Kong	1–0	2–0	2015 AFC Asian Cup qualification
3.	18 January 2015	Melbourne, Australia	Saudi Arabia	3–1	3–1	2015 AFC Asian Cup
Correct as of 18 January 2015

== Honours ==
- Uzbekistan Super Cup: 2013
