= Jahongir Khodjamov =

Kazakhstani footballer

Personal information
- Date of birth: 24 May 1996 (age 30)
- Place of birth: Turkistan, Kazakhstan
- Height: 1.85 m (6 ft 1 in)
- Position: Midfielder

Youth career
- 2007–2009: Chilanzar Tashkent
- 2009–2015: Bunyodkor Tashkent

Senior career*
| Years | Team | Apps | (Gls) |
| 2014–2015 | Bunyodkor-2 Tashkent | | |
| 2016–2017 | Kyran Shymkent | 0 | (0) |
| 2017–2019 | Energetik-BGU Minsk | 30 | (1) |
| 2020 | Kyran Shymkent | 4 | (0) |
| 2022 | FC Turkistan | 17 | (3) |
| 2023 | FC Jetisay | | |

International career
| 2018 | Kazakhstan U21 | 2 | (0) |
- * Club domestic league appearances and goals as of 31 December 2022

Jahongir Khodjamov (born 24 May 1996) is a Kazakhstani professional footballer.
