= Ahmed Soufiane =

Qatari footballer (born 1990)

Personal information
- Full name: Ahmed Soufiane Ahmed Ali Abunora
- Date of birth: August 9, 1990 (age 36)
- Place of birth: Doha, Qatar
- Height: 1.82 m (5 ft 11 1/2 in)
- Position: Goalkeeper

Youth career
- ???–2008: Mesaimeer

Senior career*
Years	Team	Apps	(Gls)
2008–2012	Al-Wakrah	41	(0)
2012–2017	El Jaish	34	(0)
2015–2017	→ Al-Kharaitiyat (loan)	52	(0)
2017–2019	Al-Kharaitiyat	32	(0)
2019–2021	Al-Duhail	0	(0)
2021–2024	Al-Gharafa	0	(0)

International career
2009–	Qatar	2	(0)
- * Club domestic league appearances and goals

Ahmed Soufiane Ahmed Ali Abunora (Arabic: احمد سفيان أحمد علي أبو نورة; born 9 August 1990) is a Qatari footballer who currently plays as a goalkeeper and also Qatar national football team.

== International career ==
al Abunora made his debut for the Qatar national football team during the 9th International Friendship Tournament held in December 2009 in a friendly game. He also played for Qatar during the 2009 Toulon Tournament.

He also represented Qatar in the 2010 Asian Games held in China.
