= Carles Coto =

Spanish footballer

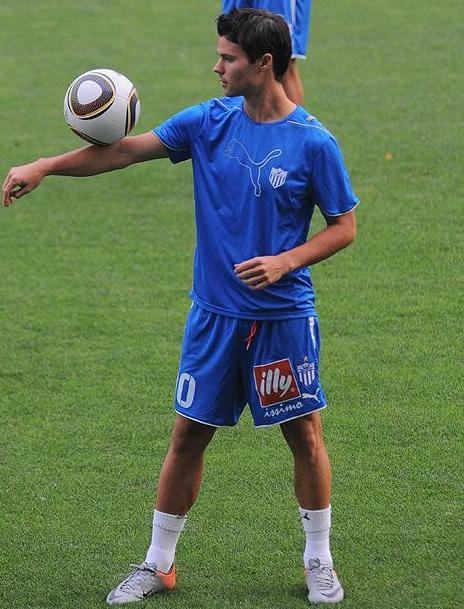

Personal information
- Full name: Carles Coto Pagès
- Date of birth: 11 February 1988 (age 38)
- Place of birth: Figueres, Spain
- Height: 1.73 m (5 ft 8 in)
- Position: Winger

Youth career
- Figueres
- 2001–2007: Barcelona

Senior career*
Years	Team	Apps	(Gls)
2007–2008	Mouscron	21	(2)
2008–2009	Sevilla B	20	(0)
2009–2010	Benidorm	31	(0)
2010–2011	Anorthosis	18	(1)
2011–2013	Dinamo Tbilisi	44	(6)
2013	Dinamo Minsk	6	(1)
2014	Bunyodkor	5	(0)
2014–2015	San Marino	22	(2)
2015–2016	Ethnikos Achna	35	(6)
2016	Doxa	8	(1)
2017	Ermis	16	(0)
2017–2018	Rayo Majadahonda	32	(6)
2018–2019	Volos	24	(0)
2019–2021	Figueres	24	(0)
2021–2023	Santa Coloma	46	(8)
2023–2024	Roda	32	(0)
Total		384	(33)

International career
2004	Spain U16	4	(1)
2007	Spain U19	6	(0)
- * Club domestic league appearances and goals

Carles Coto Pagès (born 11 February 1988) is a Spanish former professional footballer who played as a right winger.

== Club career ==
Born in Figueres, Girona, Catalonia, Coto arrived in Barcelona's youth system in 2001 at the age of 13, from local Figueres; while at the Camp Nou, he featured in Nike's 2005 "Recuerda mi nombre" ("Remember my name") advertisement alongside fellow La Masia prospect Lionel Messi. He then moved to Mouscron in Belgium, being released after one season.

Coto returned to his country in the summer of 2008, where he represented Sevilla Atlético in the Segunda División and Benidorm in the Segunda División B, suffering relegation with the former. In early July 2010, even though he still had one year of contract with the latter club, he changed teams and countries again, signing for Anorthosis Famagusta in Cyprus, managed by his former Barcelona youth coach Guillermo Ángel Hoyos.

On 28 June 2011, Coto joined Dinamo Tbilisi in Georgia, sharing teams with several compatriots. In February 2014, he signed for Uzbekistan Super League side Bunyodkor, but left in July and quickly agreed to a one-year deal at San Marino Calcio in the Lega Pro.

On 29 August 2017, the 29-year-old Coto returned to Spain with Rayo Majadahonda after brief stints with Cypriot clubs Ethnikos Achna, Doxa Katokopias and Ermis Aradippou.

== International career ==
Coto was part of the Spanish squad that won the 2007 UEFA European Under-19 Championship in Austria. He played 64 minutes of the 1–0 victory against Greece in the final.

== Career statistics ==
Appearances and goals by club, season and competition
Club	Season	League			Cup		Continental		Other		Total	
Club	Season	Division	Apps	Goals	Apps	Goals	Apps	Goals	Apps	Goals	Apps	Goals
Mouscron	2007–08	Belgian First Division	21	2	1	0	—		—		22	2
Sevilla B	2008–09	Segunda División	20	0	—		—		—		20	0
Benidorm	2009–10	Segunda División B	31	0	0	0	—		—		31	0
Anorthosis	2010–11	Cypriot First Division	18	1	0	0	4 (Note: Appearances in UEFA Europa League)	0	—		22	1
Dinamo Tbilisi	2011–12	Umaglesi Liga	27	5	1	0	5	1	—		33	6
Dinamo Tbilisi	2012–13	Umaglesi Liga	17	1	9	0	—		—		26	1
Dinamo Tbilisi	Total		44	6	10	0	5	1	—		59	7
Dinamo Minsk	2013	Belarusian Premier League	6	1	0	0	4	0	—		10	1
Bunyodkor	2014	Uzbekistan Super League	5	0	2	0	4 (Note: Appearances in AFC Champions League)	0	1 (Note: Appearance in Uzbekistan Super Cup)	0	12	0
San Marino	2014–15	Lega Pro	22	2	0	0	—		—		22	2
Ethnikos Achna	2015–16	Cypriot First Division	35	6	2	0	—		—		37	6
Ermis	2016–17	Cypriot First Division	16	0	0	0	—		—		16	0
Rayo Majadahonda	2017–18	Segunda División B	32	6	0	0	—		—		32	6
Volos	2018–19	Football League	24	0	3	1	—		—		27	1
Figueres	2019–20	Tercera División	1	0	—		—		—		1	0
Figueres	2020–21	Tercera División	23	0	—		—		—		23	0
Figueres	Total		24	0	—		—		—		24	0
Santa Coloma	2021–22	Primera Divisió	25	2	2	0	—		—		27	2
Santa Coloma	2022–23	Primera Divisió	21	6	3	0	—		—		24	6
Santa Coloma	Total		46	8	5	0	—		—		51	8
Roda	2023–24	Tercera Federación	32	0	—		—		—		32	0
Career total			376	32	23	1	17	1	1	0	417	34

== Honours ==
Dinamo Tbilisi

- Georgian Premier League: 2012–13
- Georgian Cup: 2012–13

Bunyodkor

- Uzbekistan Super Cup: 2014

Volos

- Football League: 2018–19

Spain U19

- UEFA European Under-19 Championship: 2007
