= Oleg Zoteyev =

Uzbekistani footballer

Personal information
- Full name: Oleg Vladimirovich Zoteyev
- Date of birth: 5 July 1989 (age 37)
- Place of birth: Olmaliq, Uzbek SSR, Soviet Union
- Height: 1.80 m (5 ft 11 in)
- Position: Midfielder

Team information
- Current team: Lokomotiv Tashkent
- Number: 33

Youth career
- Pakhtakor

Senior career*
Years	Team	Apps	(Gls)
2008–2009	Pakhtakor	6	(0)
2010–2012	Olmaliq	89	(14)
2013–2014	Bunyodkor	44	(8)
2015–2020	Lokomotiv Tashkent	124	(8)
2020–2021	Jeonnam Dragons	33	(1)
2022	Qizilqum	22	(0)
2023	Lokomotiv Tashkent	17	(1)
2024	Sogdiana	25	(4)
2025	Andijon	11	(1)
2026–	Lokomotiv Tashkent	13	(0)

International career^{‡}
2012	Uzbekistan U23	4	(1)
2012–2021	Uzbekistan	27	(1)
- * Club domestic league appearances and goals as of 29 July 2026 ‡ National team caps and goals as of 15 June 2021

Oleg Vladimirovich Zoteyev (Russian: Олег Владимирович Зотеев; born 5 July 1989) is an Uzbekistani professional footballer who plays as a midfielder for Lokomotiv Tashkent and Uzbekistan national team.

== Club career ==
Zoteyev was born in Olmaliq, Uzbek SSR. On 26 December 2012, he signed for capital club Bunyodkor after three years playing at Olmaliq FK. On 6 January 2015, Lokomtiv Tashkent announced signing Zoteyev. Zoteyev won his second Uzbekistan Supercup title with Lokomotiv on 8 March 2015 in a match against Pakhtakor.

== International career ==
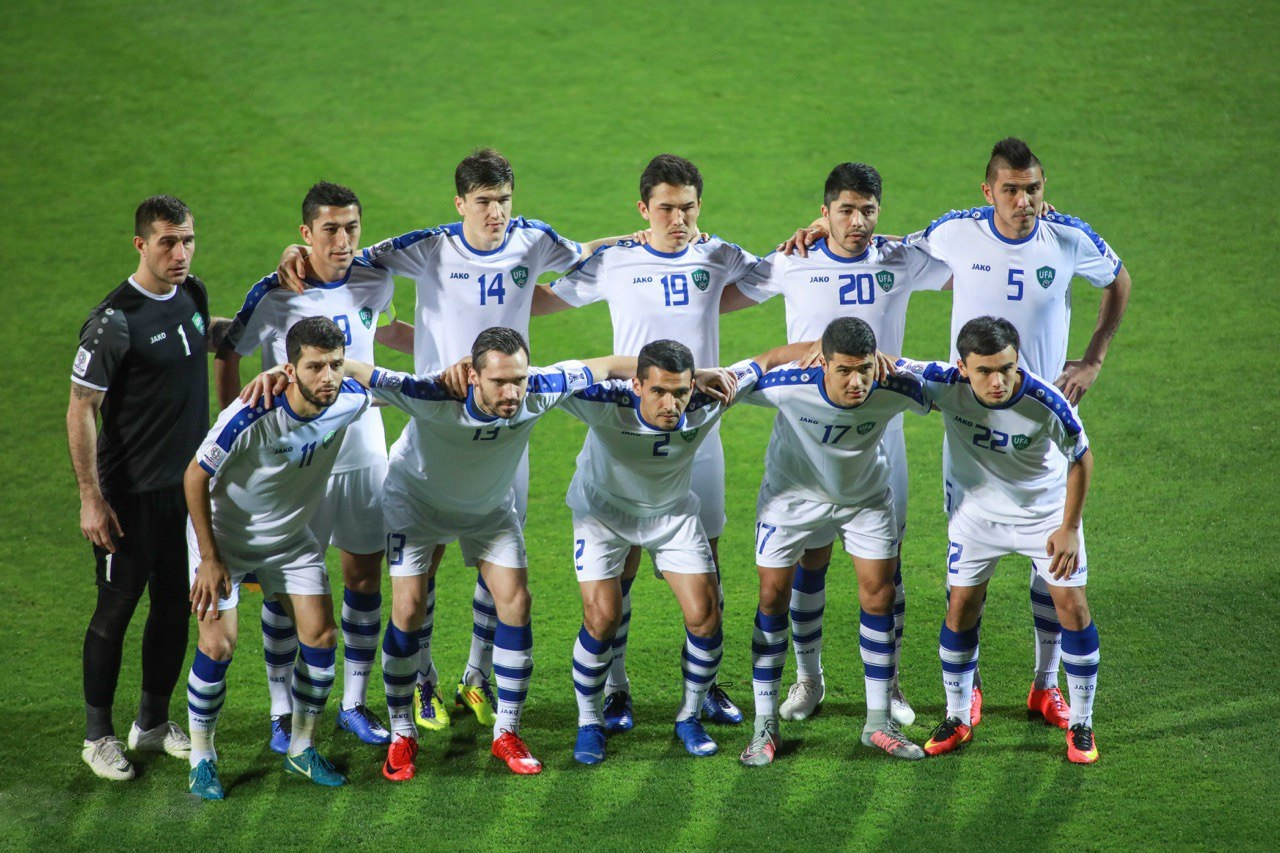
Zoteyev (№13) at 2019 Asian Cup

In the 2012 Olympics Football Tournament qualifiers, he was called to the Uzbekistan U23 team and he scored 2 goals for his team.

In the 2014 FIFA World Cup qualifiers, he was called to the Uzbekistan senior team.

== Career statistics ==
Scores and results list Uzbekistan's goal tally first.

No	Date	Venue	Opponent	Score	Result	Competition
1.	18 June 2013	Bunyodkor Stadium, Tashkent, Uzbekistan	Qatar	2–1	5–1	2014 FIFA World Cup qualification

== Honours ==
Bunyodkor

- Uzbek League: 2013
- Uzbek Cup: 2013; runner-up 2014
- Uzbekistan Super Cup: 2013

Lokomotiv Tashkent

- Uzbekistan Super Cup: 2014

Jeonnam Dragons

- Korean FA Cup: 2021
