= Ivan Milošević =

Serbian footballer

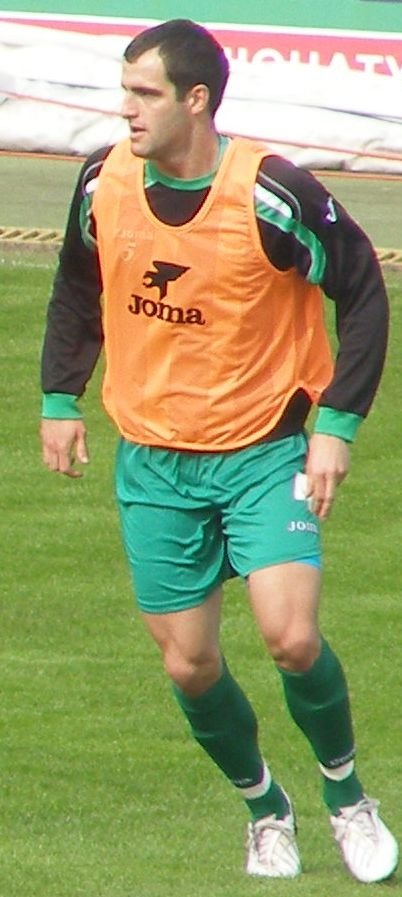
- Milošević with Karpaty Lviv in 2010

Personal information
- Date of birth: 3 November 1984 (age 41)
- Place of birth: Čačak, SR Serbia, SFR Yugoslavia
- Height: 1.89 m (6 ft 2 in)
- Position: Defender

Senior career*
Years	Team	Apps	(Gls)
2002–2004	Mladost Lučani	58	(5)
2004–2005	Radnički Beograd	9	(0)
2005–2008	Mladost Lučani	81	(9)
2008–2013	Karpaty Lviv	116	(4)
2014	Napredak Kruševac	8	(0)
2014–2015	Bunyodkor	34	(2)
2016–2024	Mladost Lučani	168	(5)
Total		474	(25)
- * Club domestic league appearances and goals

Ivan Milošević (Serbian Cyrillic: Иван Милошевић; born 3 November 1984) is a Serbian retired professional footballer who played as a defender.

== Career ==
Milošević began his career at Mladost Lučani in 2002. He later spent one season with Radnički Beograd, before returning to Mladost Lučani in 2005. In the summer of 2008, Milošević moved abroad and joined Ukrainian side Karpaty Lviv. He spent the next five seasons there, making over 130 official appearances for the club. Milošević subsequently returned to his homeland and signed with Napredak Kruševac in early 2014.

In July 2014, Milošević moved abroad for the second time and signed with Uzbek League club Bunyodkor. He played with them for two seasons, losing back-to-back Uzbekistan Cup finals in 2014 and 2015. In June 2016, Milošević rejoined his parent club Mladost Lučani.

== Career statistics ==
As of match played 8 June 2023

Appearances and goals by club, season and competition
Club	Season	League			Cup		Continental		Total	
Club	Season	Division	Apps	Goals	Apps	Goals	Apps	Goals	Apps	Goals
Karpaty Lviv	2008–09	Ukrainian Premier League	24	0	1	0	—		25	0
Karpaty Lviv	2009–10	Ukrainian Premier League	26	0	2	0	—		28	0
Karpaty Lviv	2010–11	Ukrainian Premier League	23	1	0	0	9	0	32	1
Karpaty Lviv	2011–12	Ukrainian Premier League	25	2	3	1	2	0	30	3
Karpaty Lviv	2012–13	Ukrainian Premier League	18	1	1	0	—		19	1
Karpaty Lviv	Total		116	4	7	1	11	0	134	5
Napredak Kruševac	2013–14	Serbian SuperLiga	8	0	0	0	—		8	0
Bunyodkor	2014	Uzbek League	12	2	1	0	—		13	2
Bunyodkor	2015	Uzbek League	22	0	5	0	5	0	32	0
Bunyodkor	Total		34	2	6	0	5	0	45	2
Mladost Lučani	2016–17	Serbian SuperLiga	24	0	1	0	—		25	0
Mladost Lučani	2017–18	Serbian SuperLiga	22	0	4	0	2	0	28	0
Mladost Lučani	2018–19	Serbian SuperLiga	24	0	5	0	—		29	0
Mladost Lučani	2019–20	Serbian SuperLiga	13	0	1	0	—		14	0
Mladost Lučani	2020–21	Serbian SuperLiga	20	1	1	0	—		21	1
Mladost Lučani	2021–22	Serbian SuperLiga	20	0	0	0	—		20	0
Mladost Lučani	2022–23	Serbian SuperLiga	23	1	1	0	—		24	1
Mladost Lučani	2023–24	Serbian SuperLiga	22	3	0	0	—		22	3
Mladost Lučani	Total		168	5	13	0	2	0	183	5
Career total			326	11	26	1	18	0	370	12

== Honours ==
Mladost Lučani

- Serbian First League: 2006–07
- Serbian Cup runner-up: 2017–18

Bunyodkor

- Uzbekistan Cup runner-up: 2014, 2015
