= Oleksandr Pyshchur (footballer, born 1981) =

Ukrainian footballer

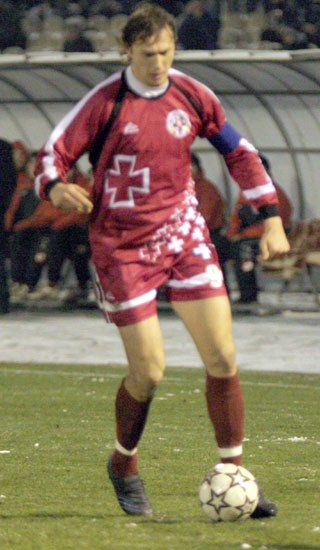

Personal information
- Full name: Oleksandr Vitaliyovych Pyshchur
- Date of birth: 29 January 1981 (age 45)
- Place of birth: Chernihiv, Ukrainian SSR, Soviet Union
- Height: 1.96 m (6 ft 5 in)
- Position: Forward

Youth career
- 1999–2000: Yunist Chernihiv

Senior career*
| Years | Team | Apps | (Gls) |
| 2001–2003 | Dnepr-Transmash Mogilev | 52 | (19) |
| 2004 | Metalist Kharkiv | 8 | (1) |
| 2004 | → Metalist-2 Kharkiv | 7 | (4) |
| 2004 | Vorskla Poltava | 7 | (0) |
| 2005 | Zakarpattia Uzhhorod | 9 | (0) |
| 2005–2006 | Volyn Lutsk | 18 | (1) |
| 2006–2007 | Zorya Luhansk | 15 | (0) |
| 2007–2009 | Volyn Lutsk | 75 | (40) |
| 2009–2010 | Ružomberok | 22 | (11) |
| 2010–2011 | Volyn Lutsk | 24 | (8) |
| 2011 | Tavriya Simferopol | 4 | (0) |
| 2012 | Volyn Lutsk | 7 | (0) |
| 2012 | → Obolon Kyiv (loan) | 16 | (4) |
| 2013–2014 | Bunyodkor | 44 | (25) |
| 2015 | Taraz | 32 | (9) |
| 2016 | Navbahor Namangan | 14 | (5) |
| 2016 | Taraz | 11 | (0) |
| 2017 | Shurtan Guzar | 3 | (0) |
| 2017 | Volyn Lutsk | 6 | (0) |
| Total | | 358 | (123) |

Managerial career
- 2019: Desna-2 Chernihiv
- * Club domestic league appearances and goals

Oleksandr Vitaliyovych Pyshchur (Ukrainian: Олександр Віталійович Пищур; born 29 January 1981) is a Ukrainian former professional footballer who played as a forward.

== Playing career ==
=== Volyn Lutsk ===
Pyshchur was the top goalscorer in Ukrainian First League for Volyn Lutsk in the 2008–09 season with 24 goals (4 penalties). After transferring to Ružomberok he became the team's top scorer as well with 11 goals in 2009–10 season and dividing the fourth place with three other top scorers of the Slovak First Football League.

After successful stint as captain of Volyn Lutsk Pyshchur transferred to Tavriya Simferopol.

=== Bunyodkor ===
In February 2013, he moved to Bunyodkor (he had been out on loan to Obolon Kyiv; but that club dissolved itself in February 2013. Pyshchur's debut for Bunyodkor was on 27 February 2013 in 2013 AFC Champions League away match against Sanfrecce Hiroshima, in which he also scored his first goal for the club. Pyshchur's league debut came in a 5–0 victory over Sogdiana Jizzakh on 4 March 2013 against, with Pyshchur scoring a hat trick in the game.

=== Taraz ===
On 21 February 2015 Pyshchur moved to Taraz, signing one-year contract with the club.

In July 2016, Pyshchur re joined Tararz after a spell with Navbahor Namangan.

== Coaching career ==
In 2019 he was appointed as coach of Desna-2 Chernihiv.

== Personal life ==
His son Oleksandr Pyshchur is a professional football player from Chernihiv that played formerly for Puskás Akadémia II and for Gyirmót, and is currently playing for Győri ETO FC

== Career statistics ==
Appearances and goals by club, season and competition
| Club | Season | League | | | Cup | | Continental | | Other | | Total | |
| Club | Season | Division | Apps | Goals | Apps | Goals | Apps | Goals | Apps | Goals | Apps | Goals |
|---|---|---|---|---|---|---|---|---|---|---|---|---|
| Dnepr-Transmash Mogilev | 2001 | Belarusian Premier League | 8 | 4 | 0 | 0 | — | | — | | 8 | 4 |
| Dnepr-Transmash Mogilev | 2002 | Belarusian Premier League | 16 | 2 | 1 | 0 | — | | — | | 17 | 2 |
| Dnepr-Transmash Mogilev | 2003 | Belarusian Premier League | 28 | 13 | 2 | 2 | — | | — | | 30 | 15 |
| Dnepr-Transmash Mogilev | Total | | 52 | 19 | 3 | 2 | — | | — | | 55 | 21 |
| Metalist Kharkiv | 2003–04 | Ukrainian First League | 8 | 1 | — | | — | | — | | 8 | 1 |
| Vorskla Poltava | 2004–05 | Ukrainian Premier League | 7 | 0 | 1 | 0 | — | | — | | 8 | 0 |
| Zakarpattia Uzhhorod | 2004–05 | Ukrainian Premier League | 3 | 0 | — | | — | | — | | 3 | 0 |
| Zakarpattia Uzhhorod | 2005–06 | Ukrainian Premier League | 6 | 0 | — | | — | | — | | 6 | 0 |
| Zakarpattia Uzhhorod | Total | | 9 | 0 | — | | — | | — | | 9 | 0 |
| Volyn Lutsk | 2005–06 | Ukrainian Premier League | 17 | 1 | 1 | 0 | — | | — | | 18 | 1 |
| Volyn Lutsk | 2006–07 | Ukrainian First League | 1 | 0 | — | | — | | — | | 1 | 0 |
| Volyn Lutsk | Total | | 18 | 1 | 1 | 0 | — | | — | | 19 | 1 |
| Zorya Luhansk | 2006–07 | Ukrainian Premier League | 15 | 0 | 2 | 0 | — | | — | | 17 | 0 |
| Volyn Lutsk | 2007–08 | Ukrainian First League | 37 | 14 | 1 | 0 | — | | — | | 38 | 14 |
| Volyn Lutsk | 2008–09 | Ukrainian First League | 30 | 22 | 1 | 0 | — | | — | | 31 | 22 |
| Volyn Lutsk | 2009–10 | Ukrainian First League | 8 | 4 | 3 | 3 | — | | — | | 11 | 7 |
| Volyn Lutsk | Total | | 75 | 40 | 5 | 3 | — | | — | | 80 | 43 |
| Ružomberok | 2009–10 | Slovak Superliga | 22 | 11 | 0 | 0 | — | | — | | 22 | 11 |
| Volyn Lutsk | 2010–11 | Ukrainian Premier League | 17 | 8 | 1 | 0 | — | | — | | 18 | 8 |
| Volyn Lutsk | 2011–12 | Ukrainian Premier League | 7 | 0 | — | | — | | — | | 7 | 0 |
| Volyn Lutsk | Total | | 24 | 8 | 1 | 0 | — | | — | | 25 | 38 |
| Tavriya Simferopol | 2011–12 | Ukrainian Premier League | 4 | 0 | 0 | 0 | — | | — | | 4 | 0 |
| Volyn Lutsk | 2011–12 | Ukrainian Premier League | 7 | 0 | 0 | 0 | — | | — | | 7 | 0 |
| Obolon Kyiv (loan) | 2012–13 | Ukrainian Premier League | 16 | 4 | 2 | 1 | — | | — | | 18 | 5 |
| Bunyodkor | 2013 | Uzbek League | 25 | 19 | 5 | 5 | 8 | 3 | — | | 38 | 27 |
| Bunyodkor | 2014 | Uzbek League | 19 | 6 | 3 | 0 | 8 | 1 | 1 | 1 | 31 | 8 |
| Bunyodkor | Total | | 44 | 25 | 8 | 5 | 16 | 4 | 1 | 1 | 69 | 35 |
| Taraz | 2015 | Kazakhstan Premier League | 32 | 9 | 2 | 0 | — | | — | | 34 | 9 |
| Navbahor Namangan | 2016 | Uzbek League | 14 | 5 | 2 | 1 | — | | — | | 16 | 6 |
| Taraz | 2016 | Kazakhstan Premier League | 11 | 0 | 0 | 0 | — | | — | | 11 | 0 |
| Shurtan Guzar | 2017 | Uzbek League | 3 | 0 | 0 | 0 | — | | — | | 3 | 0 |
| Volyn Lutsk | 2017–18 | Ukrainian First League | 6 | 0 | — | | — | | — | | 6 | 0 |
| Career total | | | 358 | 123 | 24 | 12 | 16 | 4 | 1 | 1 | 396 | 138 |

== Honours ==
Bunyodkor

- Uzbek League: 2013
- Uzbek Cup: 2013
- Uzbekistan Super Cup: 2013

Individual

- Uzbek League Top Scorer: 2013 (19 goals)
- Ukrainian First League top scorer: 2008–09 (22 goals)
