= Serhiy Symonenko =

Ukrainian footballer (born 1981)

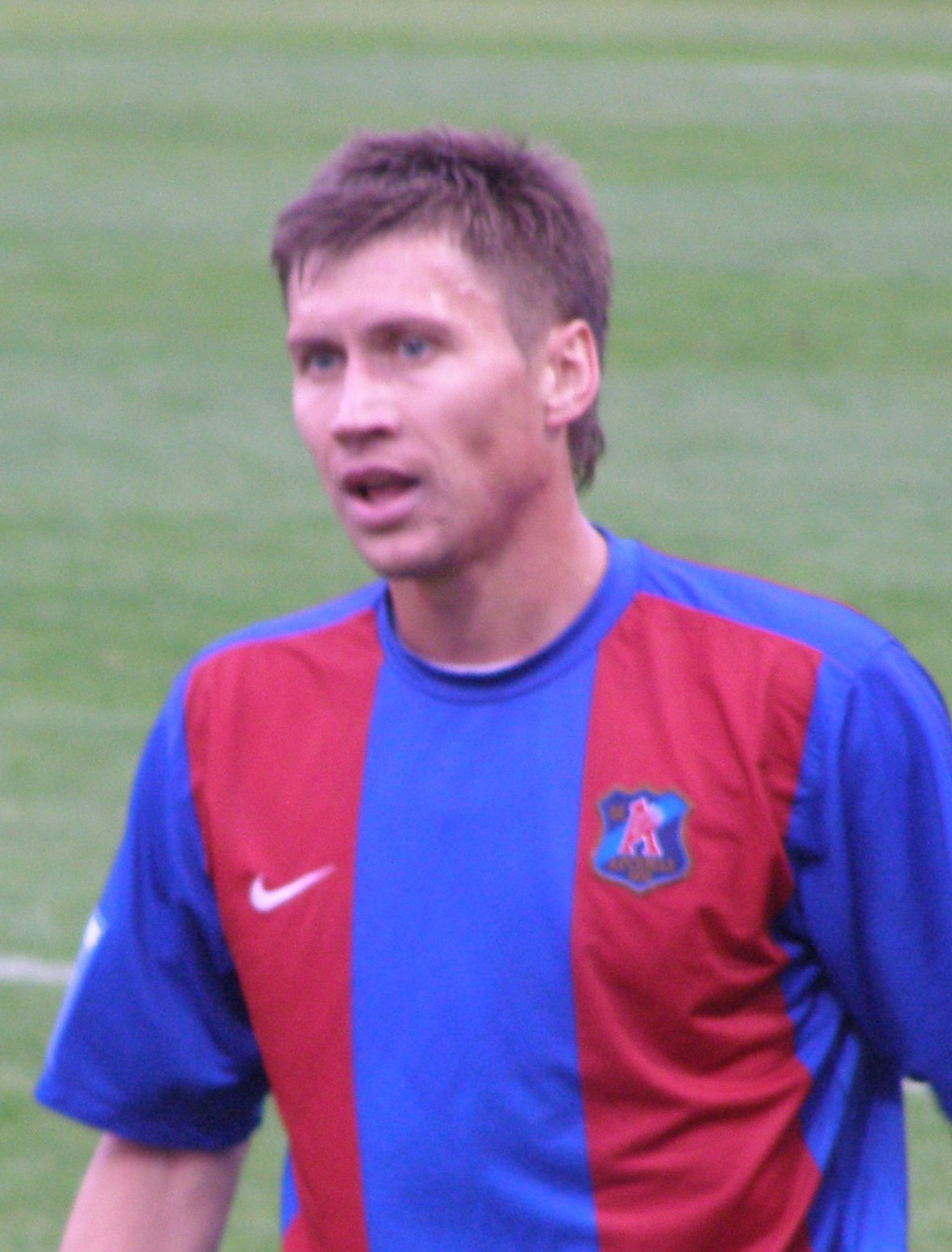
- Serhiy Symonenko (2010)

Personal information
- Full name: Serhiy Yuriyovych Symonenko
- Date of birth: 12 June 1981 (age 45)
- Place of birth: Kupiansk, Ukrainian SSR
- Height: 1.85 m (6 ft 1 in)
- Position: Defender

Team information
- Current team: Polissya Zhytomyr (assistant)

Youth career
- RVUFK Kyiv

Senior career*
Years	Team	Apps	(Gls)
1999–2001	Torpedo Moscow	5	(1)
1999–2000	→ Torpedo-d Moscow	49	(7)
2002	Alania Vladikavkaz	5	(0)
2003–2007	Chornomorets Odesa	92	(4)
2003	→ Chornomorets-2 Odesa	3	(0)
2007–2013	Arsenal Kyiv	123	(7)
2013	Sevastopol	19	(1)
2014	Bunyodkor	5	(0)

International career
2004	Ukraine	2	(0)

Managerial career
- 2022–2023: Mynai (assistant)
- 2023–2025: Oleksandriya (scout)
- 2025–: Polissya Zhytomyr (assistant)
- * Club domestic league appearances and goals

Serhiy Yuriyovych Symonenko (Ukrainian: Сергій Юрійович Симоненко; born 12 June 1981) is a Ukrainian retired football defender.

Symonenko started his career in Russia with Torpedo Moscow and then Alania Vladikavkaz before joining Chornomorets Odesa in 2002. After making over 100 appearances in all competitions for Chornomorets he joined Arsenal Kyiv for the start of the 2007–08 season.

In 2004, he played for the Ukraine national team. Symonenko made his debut for Ukraine on 18 February 2004 in an away draw with Libya (1:1). He was replaced on 62nd minute by Vyacheslav Checher.
