= Ivan Nagaev =

Uzbekistani professional footballer (born 1989)

Personal information
- Full name: Ivan Nagaev
- Date of birth: 3 July 1989 (age 37)
- Place of birth: Bekabad, Uzbek SSR, Soviet Union
- Height: 1.82 m (6 ft 0 in)
- Position: Forward

Team information
- Current team: Sogdiana Jizzakh
- Number: 88

Senior career*
Years	Team	Apps	(Gls)
2008–2009	Metallurg Bekabad	9	(2)
2009–2010	Navbahor Namangan	17	(1)
2010	Bunyodkor	1	(0)
2010	→ Metallurg Bekabad (loan)	12	(1)
2011–2012	Dinamo Samarqand	34	(13)
2013–2016	Lokomotiv Tashkent	45	(17)
2015–2016	→ Qadsia	1	(0)
2017	Buxoro	29	(10)
2018	Ordabasy	15	(3)
2018	Qizilqum Zarafshon	12	(5)
2019	Buxoro	11	(2)
2019–	Sogdiana Jizzakh	6	(1)

International career
2009	Uzbekistan U20	5	(1)
2010	Uzbekistan U22	2	(0)
2011	Uzbekistan U23	6	(0)
2012–	Uzbekistan	15	(0)
- * Club domestic league appearances and goals as of 15:32, 23 September 2019 (UTC)

Ivan Nagaev (Russian: Иван Нагаев; born 3 July 1990) is an Uzbekistani professional footballer who currently plays for FC Sogdiana Jizzakh as a forward.

== Career ==
Ivan Nagaev signed a contract with Bunyodkor and on 24 February 2011 he was officially announced as a Bunyodkor player for Season 2011. In 2011, he was loaned to Metallurg Bekabad and during the second half of the season played for FK Dinamo Samarqand.

In 2012 season he played 22 matches for Dinamo, scoring 7 goals. On 13 December 2012 he moved to Lokomotiv Tashkent. Playing for Lokomotiv in 2013 season, he became 3rd best goalscorer of the club.

== International ==
Nagaev played for Uzbekistan at the 2009 FIFA U-20 World Cup finals in Egypt. He scored one goal against England which was draw 1:1 in the end.

== Honours ==
Lokomotiv

- Uzbek League runner-up: 2013
- Uzbekistan Supercup runner-up: 2013
