= Yury Ryzhko =

Belarusian footballer

Personal information
- Full name: Yury Alyaksandrovich Ryzhko
- Date of birth: 10 October 1989 (age 37)
- Place of birth: Minsk, Belarusian SSR
- Height: 1.93 m (6 ft 4 in)
- Position: Defender

Youth career
- 2006–2009: BATE Borisov

Senior career*
Years	Team	Apps	(Gls)
2008–2009	BATE Borisov	1	(0)
2009	Smorgon	13	(0)
2010–2012	Torpedo-BelAZ Zhodino	38	(2)
2013	Slutsk	14	(1)
2013	Bukhoro	13	(0)
2014–2015	Navbahor Namangan	36	(1)
2015–2017	Isloch Minsk Raion	35	(2)
2017	Naftan Novopolotsk	15	(1)
2018	Smolevichi	0	(0)

International career
2008–2009	Belarus U21	7	(0)
2011	Belarus Olympic	4	(0)
- * Club domestic league appearances and goals as of 31 December 2017

Yury Alyaksandrovich Ryzhko (Belarusian: Юрый Рыжко; Russian: Юрий Рыжко; born 10 October 1989) is a Belarusian former professional footballer.

== Career ==
On 1 August 2013 he signed a contract with FK Buxoro to play in the Uzbek League. He made his debut for FK Buxoro on 4 August 2013 in Tashkent in a league match against Pakhtakor Tashkent.

On 20 February 2018, the BFF banned him from football for life for his involvement in the match-fixing.

== Honours ==
BATE Borisov

- Belarusian Premier League champion: 2008
