= Vyacheslav Shevchenko =

Ukrainian footballer

Personal information
- Full name: Vyacheslav Tarasovych Shevchenko
- Date of birth: 30 May 1985 (age 41)
- Place of birth: Skadovsk, Kherson Oblast, Ukrainian SSR, Soviet Union
- Height: 1.84 m (6 ft 1/2 in)
- Position: Forward

Youth career
- 2000–2001: UFK Lviv
- 2001: FC Knyazha Shchaslyve

Senior career*
Years	Team	Apps	(Gls)
2001–2003	FC Borysfen Boryspil	5	(0)
2001–2003	FC Borysfen-2 Boryspil	30	(1)
2003	FC Torpedo-Metalurg Moscow	1	(0)
2006	FC Stal Dniprodzerzhynsk	5	(0)
2007	FC Illichivets Mariupol	1	(0)
2008	FC Feniks-Illichovets Kalinine	12	(5)
2008–2011	FC Stal Alchevsk	68	(19)
2011–2013	PFC Oleksandria	69	(21)
2014	Lokomotiv Tashkent	7	(1)
2014	Birkirkara F.C.	4	(0)
2015–2016	Qizilqum Zarafshon	27	(5)
2017	FK Ogre		
2017–2019	FC Viktoriya Mykolaivka	37	(14)
2020–2024	FC Dinaz Vyshhorod	25	(4)
- * Club domestic league appearances and goals as of 1 July 2024

Vyacheslav Shevchenko (Ukrainian: В'ячеслав Тарасович Шевченко; born 30 May 1985) is a professional Ukrainian football striker.

He is nephew of former Ukraine striker Andriy Shevchenko.

Shevchenko is the product of the UFC Lviv School System. He made his debut in Ukrainian Premier League for FC Illichivets Mariupol entering as a second-half substitute against FC Metalurh Donetsk on 25 May 2007.
