= 2013 Uzbek League =

Uzbek League
- Season: 2013
- Champions: Bunyodkor
- Relegated: FK Guliston; Shurtan Guzar
- Champions League: Bunyodkor; Lokomotiv Tashkent; Nasaf Qarshi
- Matches: 182
- Goals: 543 (2.98 per match)
- Top goalscorer: Oleksandr Pyschur; 19 goals
- Biggest home win: Nasaf Qarshi 7-1 Qizilqum Zarafshon
- Biggest away win: FK Buxoro 1-5 Nasaf Qarshi; Guliston 1-5 Lokomotiv Tashkent
- Highest scoring: Lokomotiv Tashkent 6-2 Guliston; Metallurg Bekabad 5-3 Guliston; Nasaf Qarshi 7-1 Qizilqum Zarafshon; Olmaliq 5-3 Guliston
- Longest winning run: Nasaf Qarshi (9)
- Longest unbeaten run: Bunyodkor (9); Nasaf Qarshi; Pakhtakor
- Longest losing run: Qizilqum Zarafshon (6); Shurtan Guzar

The 2013 Uzbek League season was the 22nd season of top level football in Uzbekistan since independence in 1992. Pakhtakor were the defending champions from the 2012 campaign.

== Teams ==
Locations of the 2013 Uzbek League Teams

Mash'al Mubarek and FK Andijan were relegated in the last edition of the Uzbek League to First League. Sogdiana Jizzakh and FK Guliston replaced them.

Club	Coach	Location	Stadium	Capacity	2012
Bunyodkor	(Uzbekistan) Mirjalol Qosimov	Tashkent	Bunyodkor Stadium	34,000	2nd
FK Bukhoro	(Turkmenistan) Tachmurad Agamuradov	Bukhoro	Buxoro Arena	22,700	7th
FK Guliston	(Uzbekistan) Bakhtiyor Ashurmatov	Guliston	Guliston Stadium	12,400	D1, 2nd
Lokomotiv Tashkent	(Tajikistan) Khakim Fuzailov	Tashkent	Lokomotiv Stadium	8,000	3rd
Metallurg Bekabad	(Uzbekistan) Rustam Mirsodiqov	Bekabad	Metallurg Bekabad Stadium	11,000	10th
Nasaf Qarshi	(Uzbekistan) Ruziqul Berdiev	Qarshi	Qarshi Stadium	14,750	4th
Navbahor Namangan	(Uzbekistan) Usmon Asqaraliev	Namangan	Kosonsoy Stadium	30,000	12th
Neftchi Farg'ona	(Uzbekistan) Evgeniy Shokhin	Farghona	Farghona Stadium	14,520	6th
Olmaliq FK	(Uzbekistan) Igor Shkvyrin	Olmaliq	Metallurg Stadium	11,000	8th
Pakhtakor	(Uzbekistan) Murod Ismailov	Tashkent	Pakhtakor Stadium	35,000	Champions
Qizilqum Zarafshon	(Uzbekistan) Yuriy Lukin	Zarafshon	Progress Stadium	6,000	11th
Dinamo	(Uzbekistan) Ravshan Khaydarov	Samarqand	Olimpiya Stadium	12,250	9th
Sogdiana Jizzakh	(Uzbekistan) Davron Fayziev	Jizzakh	Zaamin Stadium	4,000	D1, 1st
Sho'rtan Ghuzor	(Uzbekistan) Erkin Mirzaev	Ghuzor	Ghuzor Stadium	7,000	5th

=== Managerial changes ===
Team	Outgoing manager	Manner of departure	Replaced by	Position in table	Date of appointment
Nasaf Qarshi	(Uzbekistan) Usmon Toshev	Sacked	(Uzbekistan) Ruziqul Berdiev	Pre-season	November 18, 2012
Navbahor Namangan	(Uzbekistan) Mustafo Bayramov		(Uzbekistan) Usmon Asqaraliev	Pre-season	February, 2013
FK Dinamo Samarqand	(Uzbekistan) Akhmad Ubaydullaev		(Uzbekistan) Kamo Gazarov	Pre-season	February 27, 2013
FK Dinamo Samarqand	(Uzbekistan) Kamo Gazarov	Interim role	(Uzbekistan) Ravshan Khaydarov	14th	May 6, 2013
Qizilqum Zarafshon	(Uzbekistan) Ravshan Khaydarov	Resigned	(Uzbekistan) Rustam Zabirov	14th	April 5, 2013
Qizilqum Zarafshon	(Uzbekistan) Rustam Zabirov	Sacked	(Uzbekistan) Yuriy Lukin	14th	July 29, 2013
FC Shurtan Guzar	(Germany) Edgar Gess	Sacked	(Uzbekistan) Zoir Turakulov	11th	May 15, 2013
FC Shurtan Guzar	(Uzbekistan) Zoir Turakulov	Sacked	(Uzbekistan) Erkin Mirzaev	14th	October 18, 2013
Neftchi Farg'ona	(Uzbekistan) Yuriy Sarkisyan	Sacked	(Uzbekistan) Evgeniy Shokhin	10th	May 16, 2013

== Foreign players ==
The number of foreign players is restricted to five per USL team. A team can use only five foreign players on the field in each game.

Club	Player 1	Player 2	Player 3	Player 4	AFC players	Former players
Bunyodkor	(Serbia) Marko Blažić	(Ukraine) Oleksandr Pyshchur				
Buxoro	(Belarus) Yury Ryzhko	(Nigeria) David Oniya	(Ukraine) Volodymyr Kilikevych		(Japan) Naoya Shibamura	(Georgia (country)) Giorgi Kvesieshvili
Dinamo Samarqand	(Ukraine) Andriy Melnychuk					(Ukraine) Volodymyr Kilikevych
Guliston						
Lokomotiv Tashkent	(Moldova) **Alexandru Onica**	(Russia) Yevgeni Gogol	(Russia) **Alan Kusov**		(Tajikistan) **Akmal Kholmatov**	
Metallurg Bekabad						
Nasaf					(Turkmenistan) **Artur Geworkýan**	
Navbahor Namangan	(Lithuania) **Pavelas Leusas**	(Moldova) **Denis Romanenco**				
Neftchi Fergana						
Olmaliq	(Georgia (country)) Giorgi Kvesieshvili	(Serbia) Igor Petković	(Serbia) Darko Stanojević		(Turkmenistan) **Maksatmyrat Şamyradow**	(Russia) Yevgeni Gogol
Pakhtakor Tashkent	(Armenia) Zhora Hovhannisyan	(Georgia (country)) **Kakhi Makharadze**	(Serbia) Bojan Miladinović			
Qizilqum Zarafshon						
Sogdiana Jizzakh	(Moldova) **Alexandru Melenciuc**					
Shurtan Guzar	(Georgia (country)) Giorgi Megreladze	(Lithuania) **Artūras Fomenka**				(Lithuania) **Pavelas Leusas**

In bold: Players that have been capped for their national team.

== League table ==
Pos	Team	Pld	W	D	L	GF	GA	GD	Pts	Qualification or relegation
1	Bunyodkor (C)	26	19	4	3	59	13	+46	61	2014 AFC Champions League Group stage (Note: Number of entrants per association for 2014 AFC Champions League can be changed.)
2	Lokomotiv Tashkent	26	19	3	4	63	21	+42	60	2014 AFC Champions League Play-off stage
3	Nasaf Qarshi	26	18	4	4	64	27	+37	58	2014 AFC Champions League Play-off stage
4	Pakhtakor Tashkent	26	17	3	6	45	25	+20	54	
5	Olmaliq FK	26	11	7	8	46	43	+3	40	
6	FK Buxoro	26	10	3	13	33	44	−11	33	
7	Metallurg Bekabad	26	10	3	13	36	44	−8	33	
8	FK Samarqand-Dinamo	26	8	8	10	28	36	−8	32	
9	Neftchi Farg'ona	26	9	3	14	28	31	−3	30	
10	Sogdiana Jizzakh	26	8	4	14	34	54	−20	28	
11	Navbahor Namangan	26	7	6	13	29	48	−19	27	
12	Qizilqum Zarafshon	26	8	1	17	28	48	−20	25	
13	FK Guliston (R)	26	6	2	18	28	62	−34	20	Relegation to Lower Division
14	Shurtan Guzar (R)	26	4	5	17	22	47	−25	17	Relegation to Lower Division

Updated to match(es) played on 8 November 2013. Source: Uzbekistan Professional Football League
Rules for classification: 1) points; 2) goal difference; 3) number of goals scored.
(C) Champions; (R) Relegated

== Results ==
Home \ Away	BUN	FJB	GUL	LOK	MET	NAS	NAV	NEF	OTM	PAK	QIZ	SAM	SHU	SOG
Bunyodkor		4–0	1–0	1–1	3–0	3–0	5–0	1–0	4–1	1–2	4–0	4–1	1–0	5–0
FJ Buxoro	0–0		3–1	0–1	3–1	1–5	1–1	1–0	1–0	1–0	4–3	0–2	3–2	4–1
FK Guliston	1–3	1–0		1–5	2–1	0–4	2–1	0–3	0–0	2–3	2–3	0–2	2–1	2–0
Lokomotiv Tashkent	1–1	5–1	6–2		2–1	2–0	3–0	3–1	1–0	0–1	3–1	3–1	3–0	3–1
Metallurg Bekabad	2–3	2–1	5–3	0–4		2–1	2–0	0–0	2–1	2–0	3–1	0–0	1–0	2–1
Nasaf Qarshi	1–0	3–1	3–1	2–1	3–1		5–0	2–0	2–2	1–1	7–1	3–2	3–0	4–2
Navbahor Namangan	0–3	2–3	3–0	1–1	2–1	1–2		1–1	1–3	2–2	1–0	1–1	0–1	3–1
Neftchi Farg'ona	0–1	1–0	4–1	1–3	0–1	1–1	2–0		4–0	0–3	2–0	1–0	2–0	0–2
Olmaliq FK	3–1	3–2	5–3	1–2	2–1	2–2	3–4	3–1		1–0	2–1	3–2	0–0	4–1
Pakhtakor Tashkent	0–2	2–1	2–0	1–2	5–2	1–0	2–0	1–0	1–2		1–0	4–0	4–1	4–3
Qizilqum Zarafshon	0–3	2–0	0–2	1–0	1–0	0–1	0–1	3–1	4–2	0–1		1–1	2–1	3–1
FK Samarqand-Dinamo	0–3	1–0	0–0	1–0	1–0	1–3	1–1	2–0	0–0	1–2	1–0		2–1	1–1
Shurtan Guzar	0–0	0–1	3–0	0–4	3–3	1–4	1–3	0–2	1–1	1–2	2–0	1–1		1–0
Sogdiana Jizzakh	0–2	1–1	1–0	1–4	2–1	0–2	2–0	2–1	2–2	0–0	2–1	4–3	3–1	

Updated to match(es) played on 8 November 2013. Source: Soccerway
Legend: Blue = home team win; Yellow = draw; Red = away team win.

== Season statistics ==
=== Top goalscorers ===
#	Scorer	Team	Goals (Pen.)
1	(Ukraine) Oleksandr Pyschur	Bunyodkor	19 (5)
2	(Turkmenistan) Artur Gevorkyan	Nasaf Qarshi	18 (6)
3	(Uzbekistan) Farhod Tadjiyev	Lokomotiv Tashkent	17 (1)
4	(Uzbekistan) Zafar Polvonov	Olmaliq FK	14 (0)
5	(Uzbekistan) Vokhid Shodiev	FK Buxoro	12 (0)
6	(Uzbekistan) Azamat Allaniyazov	Nasaf Qarshi	11 (0)
6	(Uzbekistan) Ilkhom Shomurodov	Nasaf Qarshi	11 (0)
6	(Uzbekistan) Muiddin Mamazulunov	Olmaliq FK/FK Guliston	11 (2)
9	(Tajikistan) (Uzbekistan) Akmal Kholmatov	Lokomotiv Tashkent	10 (0)
9	(Uzbekistan) Farrukh Shotursunov	Qizilqum/Dinamo	10 (0)
11	(Uzbekistan) Ivan Nagaev	Lokomotiv Tashkent	9 (0)
11	(Uzbekistan) Ruzimboy Ahmedov	Navbahor	9 (4)
11	(Uzbekistan) Shahzodbek Nurmatov	Metallurg Bekabad	9 (0)
14	(Uzbekistan) Dilmurod Karimov	Metallurg Bekabad	8 (0)
15	(Uzbekistan) Anvar Berdiev	Neftchi/Bunyodkor	7 (1)
15	(Uzbekistan) Sukhrob Berdiev	Sogdiana	7 (0)
15	(Uzbekistan) Alisher Shogulyamov	FK Guliston	7 (1)
15	(Uzbekistan) Pavel Solomin	Shurtan Guzar	7 (0)
15	(Uzbekistan) Lutfulla Turaev	Bunyodkor	7 (0)

Last updated: 8 November 2013
Source: Soccerway

== Awards ==
=== Monthly awards ===
Month	Manager of the Month		Player of the Month		Reference
Month	Manager	Club	Player	Club	Reference
March	(Uzbekistan) Mirjalol Qosimov	Bunyodkor	(Uzbekistan) Farhod Tadjiyev	Lokomotiv	
April	(Uzbekistan) Mirjalol Qosimov	Bunyodkor	(Uzbekistan) Akmal Kholmatov	Lokomotiv	
May	(Uzbekistan) Ruziqul Berdiev	Nasaf	(Turkmenistan) Artur Gevorkyan	Nasaf	
June	(Uzbekistan) Ruziqul Berdiev	Nasaf	(Turkmenistan) Artur Gevorkyan	Nasaf	
July	(Uzbekistan) Ruziqul Berdiev	Nasaf	(Uzbekistan) Akmal Kholmatov	Lokomotiv	
August	(Uzbekistan) Ruziqul Berdiev	Nasaf	(Turkmenistan) Artur Gevorkyan	Nasaf	
September	(Ukraine) Amet Memet	Neftchi	(Ukraine) Oleksandr Pyschur	Bunyodkor	
October	(Uzbekistan) Ruziqul Berdiev	Nasaf	(Turkmenistan) Artur Gevorkyan	Nasaf	
