= 2020–21 Keşla FK season =

Keşla
2020–21 season
- Manager: Yunis Huseynov (until 24 January); Sanan Gurbanov (from 25 January)
- Stadium: ASK Arena
- Premier League: 6th
- Azerbaijan Cup: Champions
- UEFA Europa League: First qualifying round vs Laçi
- Top goalscorer: League: Azer Salahli (5); All: César Meza (7)
Home colours	Away colours

The Keşla 2020–21 season was Keşla's twentieth season in the Azerbaijan Premier League.

== Season events ==
On 8 August, Tarlan Ahmedov left the club after his contract expired, with Yunis Huseynov being appointed as his replacement on 16 August.

On 24 January, Yunis Huseynov resigned as manager, with Sanan Gurbanov being appointed as the club's new manager on 25 January.

=== Transfers ===
On 22 June, Tural Akhundov signed for Keşla from Neftçi.

On 24 June, Shahriyar Aliyev joined Keşla from Sumgayit.

On 30 June, Javid Imamverdiyev signed for Keşla from Sabah.

On 8 July, Keşla announced the signing of Rahman Hajiyev on a season-long loan deal from Neftçi.

On 21 July, Turan Valizade also joined Keşla on a season-long loan deal from Neftçi.

On 7 August, Keşla announced the signing of Dmytro Klyots to a one-year contract, from Karpaty Lviv. Two days later, 9 August, Keşla signed Sílvio to a one-year contract from Vllaznia.

On 14 August, Keşla announced the signing of Kamal Bayramov on a one-year contract from Sabail, whilst Artur also signed a one-year contract with Keşla on 16 August, having previously been with Vorskla Poltava.

On 24 August, Keşla announced the signing of Rail Malikov from Sumgayit.

On 9 September, Keşla announced the signing of Alvaro to a one year loan from Lviv.

On 18 September, Javid Imamverdiyev left Keşla to join Sumgayit.

On 18 September, César Meza returned to Keşla on a contract until the end of the season.

On 30 November, Keşla announced the departure of Artur by mutual consent and the end if Alvaro's loan deal from Lviv.

On 26 December, Keşla signed Anatole Abang to a one-year contract.

On 6 January, Keşla announced the signing of Nijat Gurbanov on a contract until the end of the season.

On 12 January, Keşla announced that they had agreed to mutual terminate the contract of Dmytro Klyots, with Sadio Tounkara signing for Keşla until the end of the season on 13 January.

On 28 January, Rashad Sadiqov left Keşla after his contract was terminated by mutual consent.

On 9 February, Keşla announced that they had signed Eugeniu Cociuc on a free transfer after he'd left Sabah in December 2020.

=== New contracts ===
On 4 July, Stanislav Namașco signed a new one-year contract with Keşla.

On 10 July, Alexander Christovão extended his contract with Keşla for an additional year.

== Squad ==
As of match played 24 May 2021

No.	Name	Nationality	Position	Date of birth (Age)	Signed from	Signed in	Contract ends	Apps.	Goals
Goalkeepers
1	Stanislav Namașco	(Moldova)	GK	10 November 1986 (aged 34)	Zeta	2019	2021	50	0
85	Kamal Bayramov	(Azerbaijan)	GK	19 August 1985 (aged 35)	Sabail	2020	2021	6	0
Defenders
2	Ilkin Qirtimov	(Azerbaijan)	DF	4 November 1990 (aged 30)	Zira	2019	2021	117	3
3	Tarlan Guliyev	(Azerbaijan)	DF	19 April 1992 (aged 29)	Qarabağ	2016	2021	112	1
4	Shahriyar Aliyev	(Azerbaijan)	DF	25 December 1992 (aged 28)	Sumgayit	2020		31	3
8	Tural Akhundov	(Azerbaijan)	DF	1 August 1988 (aged 32)	Neftçi	2020		22	1
18	Ruslan Amirjanov	(Azerbaijan)	DF	1 February 1985 (aged 36)	Sabail	2018	2021	4	1
19	Azer Salahli	(Azerbaijan)	DF	11 April 1994 (aged 27)	Sumgayit	2018	2021	58	4
20	Rail Malikov	(Azerbaijan)	DF	18 December 1985 (aged 35)	Sumgayit	2020	2021	1	0
21	Mijuško Bojović	(Montenegro)	DF	9 August 1988 (aged 32)	Újpest	2019	2021	37	3
22	Elçin Mustafayev	(Azerbaijan)	DF	5 July 2000 (aged 20)	loan from Sabah	2021	2021	1	0
Midfielders
7	Rahman Hajiyev	(Azerbaijan)	MF	25 July 1993 (aged 27)	loan from Neftçi	2020	2021	28	4
10	César Meza	(Paraguay)	MF	5 October 1991 (aged 29)	Universitatea Craiova	2020	2021	104	20
13	Parviz Azadov	(Azerbaijan)	MF	19 October 2000 (aged 20)	Academy	2019		9	1
14	Turan Valizade	(Azerbaijan)	MF	1 January 2001 (aged 20)	loan from Neftçi	2020	2021	19	0
17	Vusal Isgandarli	(Azerbaijan)	MF	3 November 1995 (aged 25)	Zira	2019	2021	66	7
25	John Kamara	(Sierra Leone)	MF	12 May 1988 (aged 33)	Kaisar	2019	2021	60	1
29	Eugeniu Cociuc	(Moldova)	MF	11 May 1993 (aged 28)	Sabah	2021	2021	6	0
90	Orkhan Farajov	(Azerbaijan)	MF	7 January 2001 (aged 20)	Academy	2019		4	0
91	Sadio Tounkara	(Mali)	MF	27 April 1992 (aged 29)	Narva Trans	2021	2021	17	2
99	Rafael Maharramli	(Azerbaijan)	MF	1 October 1999 (aged 21)	loan from Qarabağ	2020		24	0
Forwards
9	Anatole Abang	(Cameroon)	FW	6 July 1996 (aged 24)	Sheriff Tiraspol	2020	2021	18	1
11	Sílvio	(Brazil)	FW	4 May 1994 (aged 27)	Vllaznia Shkodër	2020	2021	33	4
23	Nijat Gurbanov	(Azerbaijan)	FW	17 February 1992 (aged 29)	Samtredia	2021	2021	13	1
42	Alexander Christovão	(Angola)	FW	14 March 1993 (aged 28)	Al-Mujazzal	2020	2021	8	0
79	Bahadur Haziyev	(Azerbaijan)	FW	26 March 1999 (aged 22)	Sabail	2021		5	0
71	Emin Guliyev	(Azerbaijan)	FW	9 January 1998 (aged 23)		2018		0	0
97	Khazar Mahmudov	(Azerbaijan)	FW	23 November 2000 (aged 20)	Academy	2019		6	3
Left during the season
6	Rashad Sadiqov	(Azerbaijan)	MF	8 October 1983 (aged 37)		2019		7	0
10	Javid Imamverdiyev	(Azerbaijan)	MF	1 August 1990 (aged 30)	Sabah	2020	2021	2	0
16	Alvaro	(Brazil)	MF	10 March 1995 (aged 26)	loan from Lviv	2020	2021	6	0
22	Shohrux Gadoyev	(Uzbekistan)	MF	31 December 1991 (aged 29)	Bunyodkor	2020	2021	7	2
23	Artur	(Brazil)	DF	5 August 1994 (aged 26)	Vorskla Poltava	2020	2021	10	0
48	Dmytro Klyots	(Ukraine)	MF	15 April 1996 (aged 25)	Karpaty Lviv	2020	2021	14	1
94	Rashad Azizli	(Azerbaijan)	GK	1 January 1994 (aged 27)	Sumgayit	2019	2021	1	0

== Transfers ==
=== In ===
Date	Position	Nationality	Name	From	Fee	Ref.
22 June 2020	DF	(Azerbaijan)	Tural Akhundov	Neftçi	Undisclosed	
24 June 2020	DF	(Azerbaijan)	Shahriyar Aliyev	Sumgayit	Undisclosed	
30 June 2020	MF	(Azerbaijan)	Javid Imamverdiyev	Sabah	Undisclosed	
7 August 2020	MF	(Ukraine)	Dmytro Klyots	Karpaty Lviv	Undisclosed	
9 August 2020	FW	(Brazil)	Sílvio	Vllaznia Shkodër	Undisclosed	
14 August 2020	GK	(Azerbaijan)	Kamal Bayramov	Sabail	Undisclosed	
16 August 2020	DF	(Brazil)	Artur	Vorskla Poltava	Undisclosed	
24 August 2020	DF	(Azerbaijan)	Rail Malikov	Sumgayit	Undisclosed	
18 September 2020	MF	(Paraguay)	César Meza	Universitatea Craiova	Undisclosed	
26 December 2020	FW	(Cameroon)	Anatole Abang	Sheriff Tiraspol	Free	
6 January 2021	FW	(Azerbaijan)	Nijat Gurbanov	Samtredia	Free	
13 January 2021	MF	(Mali)	Sadio Tounkara	Narva Trans	Free	
9 February 2021	MF	(Moldova)	Eugeniu Cociuc	Sabah	Free	
10 February 2021	FW	(Azerbaijan)	Bahadur Haziyev	Sabail	Undisclosed	

=== Loans in ===
Date from	Position	Nationality	Name	From	Date to	Ref.
8 July 2020	MF	(Azerbaijan)	Rahman Hajiyev	Neftçi	End of season	
21 July 2020	MF	(Azerbaijan)	Turan Valizade	Neftçi	End of season	
20 August 2020	MF	(Azerbaijan)	Rafael Maharramli	Qarabağ	End of season	
9 September 2020	MF	(Brazil)	Alvaro	Lviv	30 November 2020	

=== Out ===
Date	Position	Nationality	Name	To	Fee	Ref.
18 September 2020	MF	(Azerbaijan)	Javid Imamverdiyev	Sumgayit	Undisclosed	

=== Released ===
Date	Position	Nationality	Name	Joined	Date	Ref.
20 July 2020	GK	(Azerbaijan)	Rashad Azizli	Zira	20 July 2020	
30 November 2020	DF	(Brazil)	Artur	Brasil de Pelotas	9 March 2021	
31 December 2020	MF	(Uzbekistan)	Shohrux Gadoyev	AGMK	9 February 2021	
12 January 2021	MF	(Ukraine)	Dmytro Klyots	Sabah	6 February 2021	
28 January 2021	MF	(Azerbaijan)	Rashad Sadiqov			
30 June 2020	DF	(Azerbaijan)	Elvin Yunuszade			
30 June 2020	MF	(Azerbaijan)	Orkhan Farajov	Sabail	11 August 2021	
30 June 2020	MF	(Azerbaijan)	Vusal Isgandarli	Ankara Keçiörengücü		
30 June 2020	MF	(Mali)	Sadio Tounkara	Keşla	23 September 2021	
30 June 2020	MF	(Moldova)	Eugeniu Cociuc	Zimbru Chișinău		
30 June 2020	MF	(Sierra Leone)	John Kamara	Keşla	19 October 2021	
30 June 2020	FW	(Angola)	Alexander Christovão			
30 June 2020	FW	(Brazil)	Sílvio	Al Dhaid		
30 June 2020	FW	(Azerbaijan)	Khazar Mahmudov	Sumgayit		

== Friendlies ==
6 September 2020	Keşla	3 – 0	Sabail	Baku
AZT (UTC+4)	Sílvio	Report		Stadium: ASK Arena

10 January 2021	Keşla	–	MOIK Baku	Baku
AZT (UTC+4)				Stadium: ASK Arena

14 January 2021	Neftçi	4 – 3	Keşla	Baku
AZT (UTC+4)	Abbasov 10'; Thallyson 36', 65'; M.Kane 62'	Report	Gurbanov 59'; Sílvio 61', 79'	Stadium: Bakcell Arena

== Competitions ==
=== Premier League ===
==== Results summary ====
Overall								Home						Away					
Pld	W	D	L	GF	GA	GD	Pts	W	D	L	GF	GA	GD	W	D	L	GF	GA	GD
28	5	11	12	24	40	−16	26	3	5	6	13	17	−4	2	6	6	11	23	−12

Last updated: 19 May 2021.
Source: See Results

==== Results by round ====
Round	1	2	3	4	5	6	7	8	9	10	11	12	13	14	15	16	17	18	19	20	21	22	23	24	25	26	27	28
Ground	A	H	A	H	A	A	H	A	H	A	H	H	A	H	A	H	A	A	A	A	H	A	H	H	A	H	A	H
Result	W	D	D	L	W	D	L	L	W	L	D	L	L	L	L	D	D	D	L	D	D	D	D	W	L	L	L	W
Position	3	3	4	6	4	5	5	5	5	5	5	6	8	7	8	7	7	7	7	7	8	8	8	6	8	8	8	6

Updated to match(es) played on 19 May 2021. Source: See Results
A = Away; H = Home; W = Win; D = Draw; L = Loss

==== Results ====
21 August 2020 1	Sumgayit	0 – 1	Keşla	Sumqayit
18:30 AZT (UTC+4)	Khachayev (yellow card) 2'; Turabov (yellow card) 24'; Najafov (yellow card) 83'	Report	Hajiyev (yellow card) 39'; Salahli 90+4'; Isgandarli (yellow card) 90+5'	Stadium: Kapital Bank Arena; Attendance: 0 Referee: Elcin Mesiyev
Note: Match played behind closed doors due to the COVID-19 pandemic.

11 September 2020 2	Keşla	1 – 1	Qarabağ	Baku
21:00 AZT (UTC+4)	Qirtimov (yellow card) 83'	Report	Guerrier (yellow card) 10'; Owusu (yellow card) 45+1'; Jafarguliyev (yellow card) 53'	Stadium: ASK Arena; Attendance: 0 Referee: Sabuhi Bayramov
Note: Match played behind closed doors due to the COVID-19 pandemic.

19 September 2020 3	Gabala	0 – 0	Keşla	Qabala
17:00 AZT (UTC+4)	Rajsel (yellow card) 21' (yellow-red card) 67'; Alemão (yellow card) 32'; Muradov (yellow card) 90+1'	Report	Bojović (yellow card) 69'; Sílvio (yellow card) 79'; Isgandarli (yellow card) 89'; Alvaro (yellow card) 89'	Stadium: Gabala City Stadium; Attendance: 0 Referee: Raad Ahmadov
Note: Match played behind closed doors due to the COVID-19 pandemic.

26 September 2020 4	Keşla	2 – 3	Zira	Baku
20:15 AZT (UTC+4)	Sílvio 10'; Klyots 55'; Aliyev (yellow card) 76'; Qirtimov (yellow card) 90+2'; Artur (yellow card) 90+2'	Report	Clésio 21', 69'; Đorđević (yellow card) 23'; Rahimov (yellow card) 74'; Volkovi 80' (pen.); Chantakias (yellow card) 90+2'; Sesay (yellow card) 90+3'	Stadium: ASK Arena; Attendance: 0 Referee: Ravan Hamzazada
Note: Match played behind closed doors due to the COVID-19 pandemic.

2 October 2020 5	Sabah	0 – 2	Keşla	Masazır
15:30 AZT (UTC+4)	Mirzabeyov (yellow card) 74'; A.Diallo (yellow card) 90+3'	Report	Hajiyev (yellow card) 39'; Kamara (yellow card) 47'; Sílvio 54'; Aliyev (yellow card) 88'; Isgandarli 90'; Amirjanov (yellow card) 90+3'	Stadium: Bank Respublika Arena; Attendance: 0 Referee: Vugar Hasanli
Note: Match played behind closed doors due to the COVID-19 pandemic.

17 October 2020 6	Sabail	1 – 1	Keşla	Baku
14:00 AZT (UTC+4)	Naghiyev (yellow card) 7' (yellow-red card) 83'; Haziyev 51'	Report	Aliyev (yellow card) 12'; Hajiyev 49'; Isgandarli (yellow card) 63'; Sílvio (yellow card) 72'	Stadium: Bayil Arena; Attendance: 0 Referee: Sanuhi Bayramov
Note: Match played behind closed doors due to the COVID-19 pandemic.

24 October 2020 7	Keşla	0 – 1	Neftçi	Baku
16:00 AZT (UTC+4)	Klyots (yellow card) 33'	Report	Buludov (yellow card) 20'; Abbasov (yellow card) 67'; Alaskarov 68'; Telushi (yellow card) 78'	Stadium: ASK Arena; Attendance: 0 Referee: Raad Ahmadov
Note: Match played behind closed doors due to the COVID-19 pandemic.

1 November 2020 8	Qarabağ	6 – 1	Keşla	Baku
16:00 AZT (UTC+4)	Ozobić 4', 60'; B.Huseynov 12'; Owusu 38'; Emreli 65', 89'	Report	Isgandarli 25'; Kamara (yellow card) 41'; Qirtimov (yellow card) 85'; Azadov (yellow card) 90+1'	Stadium: Azersun Arena; Attendance: 0 Referee: Aliyar Agayev
Note: Match played behind closed doors due to the COVID-19 pandemic.

7 November 2020 9	Keşla	3 – 1	Gabala	Baku
14:00 AZT (UTC+4)	Meza 41'; Mammadov 75' (o.g.); Sílvio 90'; Amirjanov (yellow card) 90+1'	Report	Rajsel 32'; Nabiyev (yellow card) 57'	Stadium: ASK Arena; Attendance: 0 Referee: Elcin Masiyev
Note: Match played behind closed doors due to the COVID-19 pandemic.

22 November 2020 10	Zira	3 – 1	Keşla	Zirə
16:00 AZT (UTC+4)	Chantakias 33'; Tashkin (yellow card) 34'; Hajili (yellow card) 42'; Ramazanov 60'; Jamalov (yellow card) 79'; Đorđević (yellow card) 83'; Clésio 90+5'	Report	Azadov (yellow card) 5'; Kamara (yellow card) 28'; Valizade (yellow card) 61'; Clésio 73' (o.g.)	Stadium: Zira Olympic Sport Complex Stadium; Attendance: 0 Referee: Aliyar Agayev
Note: Match played behind closed doors due to the COVID-19 pandemic.

29 November 2020 11	Keşla	1 – 1	Sabah	Baku
14:00 AZT (UTC+4)	Kamara (yellow card) 10' (yellow-red card) 54'; Meza (yellow card) 11' (goal) 85'; Qirtimov (yellow card) 29' (yellow-red card) 86'; Guliyev (yellow card) 36'; Bojović (yellow card) 67'	Report	Seydiyev (yellow card) 58'; Koubemba 60' (yellow card) 90+2'	Stadium: ASK Arena; Attendance: 0 Referee: Ingilab Mammadov
Note: Match played behind closed doors due to the COVID-19 pandemic.

20 December 2020 12	Keşla	0 – 2	Sabail	Baku
16:00 AZT (UTC+4)	Isgandarli (yellow card) 50'	Report	U.Abbasov 12'; Ismayilov 18'; Naghiyev (yellow card) 68'	Stadium: ASK Arena; Attendance: 0 Referee: Ravan Hamzazada
Note: Match originally scheduled for 5 December, but postponed. Match played behind closed doors due to the COVID-19 pandemic.

24 December 2020 13	Neftçi	2 – 1	Keşla	Baku
18:00 AZT (UTC+4)	Krivotsyuk (yellow card) 18'; Abbasov 65', 81'	Report	Hajiyev 68'	Stadium: Eighth Kilometer District Stadium; Attendance: 0 Referee: Elcin Masiyev
Note: Match played behind closed doors due to the COVID-19 pandemic.

22 January 2021 14	Keşla	0 – 1	Sumgayit	Baku
16:00 AZT (UTC+4)	Kamara (yellow card) 18'; Salahli (yellow card) 22'; Isgandarli (yellow card) 36'; E.Mustafayev (red card) 38'	Report	E.Mustafayev 3' (o.g.); Ghorbani (yellow card) 38'; Khodzhaniyazov (yellow card) 50'	Stadium: ASK Arena; Attendance: 0 Referee: Aliyar Agayev
Note: Match played behind closed doors due to the COVID-19 pandemic.

14 February 2021 15	Gabala	2 – 0	Keşla	Qabala
15:00 AZT (UTC+4)	Mammadov (yellow card) 19'; Musayev (yellow card) 45+1'; Rajsel (yellow card) 45+1'; Gigauri 50'; Vukčević (yellow card) 65'; Utzig 70'	Report	Tounkara (yellow card) 26'; Cociuc (yellow card) 50'; Bojović (yellow card) 61'	Stadium: Gabala City Stadium; Attendance: 0 Referee: Rauf Jabbarov
Note: Match played behind closed doors due to the COVID-19 pandemic.

20 February 2021 16	Keşla	2 – 2	Zira	Baku
16:00 AZT (UTC+4)	Gurbanov 19'; Tounkara 21'; Meza (yellow card) 24'; Sílvio (yellow card) 78'	Report	Clésio 17'; Jamalov (yellow card) 33'; Chantakias (red card) 61'; Volkovi 73'	Stadium: ASK Arena; Attendance: 0 Referee: Elcin Mesiyev
Note: Match played behind closed doors due to the COVID-19 pandemic.

25 February 2021 17	Sabah	1 – 1	Keşla	Masazır
17:30 AZT (UTC+4)	S.Seyidov (yellow card) 5'; Ochihava (yellow card) 19'; Marina (yellow card) 48'; Koubemba (yellow card) 64'; Fofana 90+1'	Report	T.Guliyev (yellow card) 36'; Cociuc (yellow card) 38'; Sílvio (yellow card) 55'; Aliyev 79'; Malikov (yellow card) 79'	Stadium: Bank Respublika Arena; Attendance: 0 Referee: Vugar Hasanli
Note: Match played behind closed doors due to the COVID-19 pandemic.

2 March 2021 18	Sabail	1 – 1	Keşla	Baku
16:00 AZT (UTC+4)	P.Keshavarz 75' (yellow card) 78'; Aliyev (yellow card) 75'	Report	Akhundov 54'; Aliyev (yellow card) 72'; Abang (yellow card) 75'; Guliyev (yellow card) 82'	Stadium: Bayil Arena; Attendance: 0 Referee: Aliyar Agayev
Note: Match played behind closed doors due to the COVID-19 pandemic.

8 March 2021 19	Neftçi	3 – 1	Keşla	Baku
18:15 AZT (UTC+4)	Alaskarov 6', 64' (pen.) (yellow card) 69'; Buludov 19'; Mahmudov (yellow card) 33'; Mbodj (yellow card) 59'	Report	Meza (yellow card) 8'; Kamara (yellow card) 24'; Salahli 81'	Stadium: Eighth Kilometer District Stadium; Attendance: 0 Referee: Rauf Jabbarov
Note: Match played behind closed doors due to the COVID-19 pandemic.

13 March 2021 20	Sumgayit	2 – 2	Keşla	Sumqayit
19:15 AZT (UTC+4)	Ghorbani (yellow card) 46'; Khodzhaniyazov 49'; Sadykhov 80'; Hüseynov (yellow card) 88'	Report	Salahli 3', 74'; Akhundov (yellow card) 90+4'; Guliyev (yellow card) 90+8'	Stadium: Kapital Bank Arena; Attendance: 0 Referee: Elcin Mesiyev
Note: Match played behind closed doors due to the COVID-19 pandemic.

4 April 2021 21	Keşla	1 – 1	Qarabağ	Baku
18:30 AZT (UTC+4)	Hajiyev 7'; Qirtimov (yellow card) 46'; Abang (yellow card) 62'; Sílvio (yellow card) 70'	Report	Medina (yellow card) 34'; Owusu (yellow card) 69'; Andrade 90+2' (pen.)	Stadium: ASK Arena; Attendance: 0 Referee: Ravan Hamzazada
Note: Match played behind closed doors due to the COVID-19 pandemic.

11 April 2021 22	Zira	0 – 0	Keşla	Zirə
17:00 AZT (UTC+4)	Ramazanov (yellow card) 38'; Bongongui (yellow card) 60'; Aliyev (yellow card) 70'; Tashkin (yellow card) 81'	Report	Aliyev (yellow card) 51'; Valizade (yellow card) 53'; Abang (yellow card) 61'	Stadium: Zira Olympic Sport Complex Stadium; Attendance: 0 Referee: Raad Ahmadov
Note: Match played behind closed doors due to the COVID-19 pandemic.

17 April 2021 23	Keşla	0 – 0	Sabah	Baku
18:00 AZT (UTC+4)	Amirjanov (yellow card) 79'; Valizade (yellow card) 80'; Sílvio (yellow card) 82'; Aliyev (yellow card) 90+1'	Report	Mustafazade (yellow card) 34'; Marina (yellow card) 37'; Ochihava (yellow card) 46'	Stadium: ASK Arena; Attendance: 0 Referee: Elcin Masiyev
Note: Match played behind closed doors due to the COVID-19 pandemic.

25 April 2021 24	Keşla	1 – 0	Sabail	Baku
18:00 AZT (UTC+4)	Akhundov (yellow card) 29'; Meza (yellow card) 45' (goal) 51'; Salahli (yellow card) 71'; Namașco (yellow card) 90+1'	Report		Stadium: ASK Arena; Attendance: 0 Referee: Rauf Jabbarov
Note: Match played behind closed doors due to the COVID-19 pandemic.

3 May 2021 25	Keşla	0 – 3	Neftçi	Baku
18:00 AZT (UTC+4)	Guliyev (yellow card) 50'; Gurbanov (yellow card) 59'; Valizade (yellow card) 90+1'	Report	Abbasov 38'; Kane (yellow card) 59'; Honda 74'; Mahmudov 90+2'	Stadium: ASK Arena; Attendance: 0 Referee: Aliyar Agayev
Note: Match played behind closed doors due to the COVID-19 pandemic.

8 May 2021 26	Keşla	0 – 1	Sumgayit	Baku
18:00 AZT (UTC+4)	Abang (yellow card) 40'; Kamara (yellow card) 63'; Gurbanov (yellow card) 65'; Tounkara (yellow card) 79'	Report	Hüseynov (yellow card) 26'; Turabov (yellow card) 45+1'; Badalov (yellow card) 70'; Sadykhov 78' (pen.); Jannatov (yellow card) 82'	Stadium: ASK Arena; Attendance: 0 Referee: Raad Ahmadov
Note: Match played behind closed doors due to the COVID-19 pandemic.

14 May 2021 27	Qarabağ	2 – 0	Keşla	Baku
19:00 AZT (UTC+4)	Emreli 47'; Kwabena 74'	Report	Aliyev (yellow card) 67'	Stadium: Azersun Arena; Attendance: 0 Referee: Kamal Umudlu
Note: Match played behind closed doors due to the COVID-19 pandemic.

19 May 2021 28	Keşla	3 – 1	Gabala	Baku
18:00 AZT (UTC+4)	Aliyev 15' (yellow card) 40'; Sílvio 16'; Isgandarli (yellow card) 28' (goal) 90+1'; Tounkara (yellow card) 35'; Meza (red card) 75'; Qirtimov (yellow card) 90+6'	Report	Adeniyi 26'; Vukčević (yellow card) 30'; Musayev (yellow card) 69'	Stadium: ASK Arena; Attendance: 0 Referee: Ravan Hamzazada
Note: Match played behind closed doors due to the COVID-19 pandemic.

==== League table ====
Pos	Team	Pld	W	D	L	GF	GA	GD	Pts	Qualification
4	Zira	28	8	14	6	28	28	0	38	
5	Sabah	28	7	8	13	28	38	−10	29	
6	Keşla	28	5	11	12	25	40	−15	26	Qualification to Europa Conference League second qualifying round
7	Gabala	28	5	11	12	23	44	−21	26	
8	Sabail	28	5	9	14	21	42	−21	24	

Source: Soccerway
Rules for classification: 1) Points; 2) Head-to-head points; 3) Head-to-head goal difference; 4) Head-to-head goals scored; 5) Head-to-head away goals scored (only if two teams); 6) Goal difference; 7) Goals scored.

=== Azerbaijan Cup ===
2 February 2021 Quarterfinal 1st leg	Keşla	1 – 0	Kapaz	Baku
16:00 AZT (UTC+4)	Meza 43' (pen.); Isgandarli (yellow card) 65'	Report	A.Samadov (yellow card) 36'; U.Samadov (yellow card) 42'; R.Suleymanov (yellow card) 45'; G.Aliyev (yellow card) 50'	Stadium: ASK Arena; Attendance: 0 Referee: Rahim Hasanov
Note: Match played behind closed doors due to the COVID-19 pandemic in Azerbaijan.

7 February 2021 Quarterfinal 2nd leg	Kapaz	0 – 2 (0 – 3 agg.)	Keşla	Ganja
14:30 AZT (UTC+4)		Report	Bojović (yellow card) 27'; Maharramli (yellow card) 44'; Kamara (yellow card) 55'; Hajiyev 59'; Meza (yellow card) 68'; Abang (yellow card) 85' (goal) 90'	Stadium: Ganja City Stadium; Attendance: 0 Referee: Elcin Masiyev
Note: Match played behind closed doors due to the COVID-19 pandemic in Azerbaijan.

21 April 2021 Semifinal 1st leg	Keşla	1 – 2	Zira	Baku
18:30 AZT (UTC+4)	Kamara (yellow card) 33'; Hajiyev (yellow card) 45'; Tounkara 45+1'; Aliyev (yellow card) 90+4'	Report	Ramazanov (yellow card) 17'; Bongongui 57'; Andjelkovic 62'; Richard (yellow card) 72'; Muradov (yellow card) 90+1'	Stadium: ASK Arena; Attendance: 0 Referee: Kamal Umudlu
Note: Match played behind closed doors due to the COVID-19 pandemic in Azerbaijan.

29 April 2021 Semifinal 2nd leg	Zira	2 – 3 (4 – 4 (a) agg.)	Keşla	Zirə
20:00 AZT (UTC+4)	Muradov (yellow card) 26'; Aliyev 48' (o.g.); Hajili (yellow card) 84'; Đorđević (red card) 88'; Andjelkovic (yellow card) 90'; Clésio 92'; Azizli (yellow card) 96'; Bayramli (yellow card) 102'; Tashkin (red card) 120'	Report	Isgandarli (yellow card) 10'; Valizade (yellow card) 61'; Meza 67', 90+1' (pen.), 93'; Guliyev (yellow card) 79'; Bayramov (yellow card) 93'; Sílvio (yellow card) 110'	Stadium: Zira Olympic Sport Complex Stadium; Attendance: 0 Referee: Elcin Masiyev
Note: Match played behind closed doors due to the COVID-19 pandemic in Azerbaijan.

==== Final ====
24 May 2021	Sumgayit	1 – 2	Keşla	Masazır
19:30 AZT (UTC+4)	Bojović 3' (o.g.); Khodzhaniyazov (yellow card) 16'; Najafov (yellow card) 46'; Mustafayev (yellow card) 69'	Report	Aliyev (yellow card) 33' (goal) 37'; Bojović 57'	Stadium: Bank Respublika Arena; Referee: Aliyar Agayev

=== UEFA Europa League ===
==== Qualifying rounds ====
27 August 2020 First qualifying round	Keşla (Azerbaijan)	0 – 0 (a.e.t.) (4 – 5 p)	(Albania) Laçi	Baku, Azerbaijan
21:00 AZT (UTC+4)	Klyots (yellow card) 27'; Aliyev (yellow card) 71' (yellow-red card) 112'	Report	Ramos (yellow card) 37' (yellow-red card) 72'; Selmani (yellow card) 102'	Stadium: ASK Arena; Attendance: 0 Referee: Georgi Kikacheishvili (Georgia)
	Penalties
	Klyots (penalty scored); Sílvio (penalty scored); Akhundov (penalty scored); Hajiyev (penalty scored); Qirtimov (penalty missed)		(penalty scored) Nwabueze; (penalty scored) Lushkja; (penalty scored) Rapo; (penalty scored) Mazrekaj; (penalty scored) Ignjatović
Note: Match played behind closed doors due to the COVID-19 pandemic in Europe.

== Squad statistics ==
As of Match played 24 May 2021

=== Appearances and goals ===
No.	Pos	Nat	Player	Total		Premier League		Azerbaijan Cup		Europa League	
No.	Pos	Nat	Player	Apps	Goals	Apps	Goals	Apps	Goals	Apps	Goals
1	GK	(Moldova) MDA	Stanislav Namașco	28	0	23	0	4	0	1	0
2	DF	(Azerbaijan) AZE	Ilkin Qirtimov	18	0	13	0	2+2	0	1	0
3	DF	(Azerbaijan) AZE	Tarlan Guliyev	20	0	16+2	0	2	0	0	0
4	DF	(Azerbaijan) AZE	Shahriyar Aliyev	31	3	25	2	5	1	1	0
7	MF	(Azerbaijan) AZE	Rahman Hajiyev	28	4	16+6	3	5	1	1	0
8	DF	(Azerbaijan) AZE	Tural Akhundov	22	1	16+2	1	3	0	0+1	0
9	FW	(Cameroon) CMR	Anatole Abang	18	1	11+2	0	3+2	1	0	0
10	MF	(Paraguay) PAR	César Meza	23	7	16+2	3	5	4	0	0
11	FW	(Brazil) BRA	Sílvio	33	4	17+10	4	2+3	0	0+1	0
13	MF	(Azerbaijan) AZE	Parviz Azadov	3	0	2+1	0	0	0	0	0
14	MF	(Azerbaijan) AZE	Turan Valizade	19	0	9+7	0	1+2	0	0	0
17	MF	(Azerbaijan) AZE	Vusal Isgandarli	31	3	21+5	3	2+2	0	1	0
18	DF	(Azerbaijan) AZE	Ruslan Amirjanov	2	0	1+1	0	0	0	0	0
19	DF	(Azerbaijan) AZE	Azer Salahli	31	4	25	4	5	0	1	0
20	DF	(Azerbaijan) AZE	Rail Malikov	1	0	1	0	0	0	0	0
21	DF	(Montenegro) MNE	Mijuško Bojović	18	1	13+1	0	3	1	1	0
22	DF	(Azerbaijan) AZE	Elçin Mustafayev	1	0	1	0	0	0	0	0
23	FW	(Azerbaijan) AZE	Nijat Gurbanov	13	1	6+5	1	1+1	0	0	0
25	MF	(Sierra Leone) SLE	John Kamara	27	0	22+1	0	3	0	1	0
29	MF	(Moldova) MDA	Eugeniu Cociuc	6	0	5	0	0+1	0	0	0
42	FW	(Angola) ANG	Alexander Christovão	2	0	1	0	0	0	1	0
79	FW	(Azerbaijan) AZE	Bahadur Haziyev	5	0	0+4	0	0+1	0	0	0
85	GK	(Azerbaijan) AZE	Kamal Bayramov	6	0	5	0	1	0	0	0
91	MF	(Mali) MLI	Sadio Tounkara	17	2	6+6	1	4+1	1	0	0
97	FW	(Azerbaijan) AZE	Khazar Mahmudov	2	0	1+1	0	0	0	0	0
99	MF	(Azerbaijan) AZE	Rafael Maharramli	24	0	16+4	0	4	0	0	0
Players away on loan:
Players who left Keşla during the season:
10	MF	(Azerbaijan) AZE	Javid Imamverdiyev	2	0	0+1	0	0	0	0+1	0
16	MF	(Brazil) BRA	Alvaro	6	0	1+5	0	0	0	0	0
22	MF	(Uzbekistan) UZB	Shohrux Gadoyev	1	0	1	0	0	0	0	0
23	DF	(Brazil) BRA	Artur	10	0	7+2	0	0	0	1	0
48	MF	(Ukraine) UKR	Dmytro Klyots	14	1	12+1	1	0	0	1	0

=== Goal scorers ===
Place	Position	Nation	Number	Name	Premier League	Azerbaijan Cup	Europa League	Total
1	MF	(Paraguay)	10	César Meza	3	4	0	7
2	DF	(Azerbaijan)	19	Azer Salahli	5	0	0	5
3	FW	(Brazil)	11	Sílvio	4	0	0	4
3	MF	(Azerbaijan)	7	Rahman Hajiyev	3	1	0	4
5	MF	(Azerbaijan)	17	Vusal Isgandarli	3	0	0	3
6	MF	(Mali)	91	Sadio Tounkara	1	1	0	2
6	DF	(Azerbaijan)	4	Shahriyar Aliyev	1	1	0	2
8	MF	(Ukraine)	48	Dmytro Klyots	1	0	0	1
8	FW	(Azerbaijan)	23	Nijat Gurbanov	1	0	0	1
8	DF	(Azerbaijan)	8	Tural Akhundov	1	0	0	1
8	FW	(Cameroon)	9	Anatole Abang	0	1	0	1
8	DF	(Montenegro)	21	Mijuško Bojović	0	1	0	1
8				Own goal	1	0	0	1
				TOTALS	25	9	0	34

=== Clean sheets ===
Place	Position	Nation	Number	Name	Premier League	Azerbaijan Cup	Europa League	Total
1	GK	(Moldova)	1	Stanislav Namașco	4	2	1	7
2	GK	(Azerbaijan)	85	Kamal Bayramov	2	0	0	2
				TOTALS	6	2	1	9

=== Disciplinary record ===
Number	Nation	Position	Name	Premier League		Azerbaijan Cup		Europa League		Total	
Number	Nation	Position	Name	Yellow card	Red card	Yellow card	Red card	Yellow card	Red card	Yellow card	Red card
1	(Moldova)	GK	Stanislav Namașco	1	0	0	0	0	0	1	0
2	(Azerbaijan)	DF	Ilkin Qirtimov	7	1	0	0	0	0	7	1
3	(Azerbaijan)	DF	Tarlan Guliyev	5	0	1	0	0	0	6	0
4	(Azerbaijan)	DF	Shahriyar Aliyev	8	0	2	0	2	1	12	1
7	(Azerbaijan)	MF	Rahman Hajiyev	2	0	1	0	0	0	3	0
8	(Azerbaijan)	DF	Tural Akhundov	2	0	0	0	0	0	1	0
9	(Cameroon)	FW	Anatole Abang	4	0	1	0	0	0	5	0
10	(Paraguay)	MF	César Meza	4	1	1	0	0	0	5	1
11	(Brazil)	FW	Sílvio	6	0	1	0	0	0	7	0
13	(Azerbaijan)	MF	Parviz Azadov	2	0	0	0	0	0	2	0
14	(Azerbaijan)	MF	Turan Valizade	4	0	1	0	0	0	5	0
17	(Azerbaijan)	MF	Vusal Isgandarli	6	0	2	0	0	0	8	0
18	(Azerbaijan)	DF	Ruslan Amirjanov	3	0	0	0	0	0	3	0
19	(Azerbaijan)	DF	Azer Salahli	2	0	0	0	0	0	2	0
20	(Azerbaijan)	DF	Rail Malikov	1	0	0	0	0	0	1	0
21	(Montenegro)	DF	Mijuško Bojović	3	0	1	0	0	0	4	0
22	(Azerbaijan)	DF	Elçin Mustafayev	0	1	0	0	0	0	0	1
23	(Azerbaijan)	FW	Nijat Gurbanov	2	0	0	0	0	0	2	0
25	(Sierra Leone)	MF	John Kamara	8	1	2	0	0	0	10	1
29	(Moldova)	MF	Eugeniu Cociuc	2	0	0	0	0	0	2	0
85	(Azerbaijan)	GK	Kamal Bayramov	0	0	1	0	0	0	1	0
91	(Mali)	MF	Sadio Tounkara	3	0	0	0	0	0	3	0
99	(Azerbaijan)	MF	Rafael Maharramli	0	0	1	0	0	0	1	0
Players who left Keşla during the season:
16	(Brazil)	MF	Alvaro	1	0	0	0	0	0	1	0
23	(Brazil)	DF	Artur	1	0	0	0	0	0	1	0
48	(Ukraine)	MF	Dmytro Klyots	1	0	0	0	1	0	2	0
			TOTALS	78	4	15	0	3	1	96	5
