= 2021–22 Keşla FK season =

Shamakhi
2021–22 season
- Manager: Sanan Gurbanov
- Stadium: Şamaxı Sahar Stadium
- Premier League: 7th
- Azerbaijan Cup: Quarterfinal vs Qarabağ
- UEFA Europa Conference League: Second qualifying round vs Sochi
- Top goalscorer: League: Felipe Santos (6); All: Felipe Santos (7)
Home colours	Away colours

The 2021-22 Shamakhi FK season (formerly known 2021 as Keşla FK) is the clubs twenty-first edition in the Azerbaijan Premier League and football.

== Season events ==
On 2 June, Turan Valizade's loan from Neftçi was extended for an additional season.

On 24 June, Keşla announced the signings of Oumar Goudiaby from Shkupi and Aldair Neto from Pelister.

On 1 July, Keşla announced the signings of Amil Yunanov from Sabail and Felipe Santos from Maribor.

On 9 July, Keşla announced the signing of Karim Diniyev from Zira.

On 27 December, Keşla announced that Anatole Abang and Nijat Gurbanov had left the club after their contracts had expired, whilst Oumar Goudiaby and John Kamara left the club by mutual consent.

On 29 December, Keşla announced the signing of Fahmin Muradbayli on loan from Neftçi for the remainder of the season, whilst Azer Salahli joined Neftçi on a permanent deal.

On 13 January, Franco Flores returned to the club, signing a contract until the end of the season.

On 24 January, Mijuško Bojović left the club by mutual consent.

On 3 February, Keşla announced the signing of Nathan Oduwa on a contract until the end of the season.

On 6 April, the Azerbaijan Premier League approved the club's name change from Keşla FK to Shamakhi FK.

== Squad ==
As of match played 21 May 2022

No.	Name	Nationality	Position	Date of birth (age)	Signed from	Signed in	Contract ends	Apps.	Goals
Goalkeepers
1	Stanislav Namașco	(Moldova)	GK	10 November 1986 (age 40)	Zeta	2019		77	0
27	Akbar Valiyev	(Azerbaijan)	GK	7 September 2001 (age 25)	Academy	2021		1	0
85	Kamal Bayramov	(Azerbaijan)	GK	19 August 1985 (age 41)	Sabail	2020		12	0
Defenders
2	Ilkin Qirtimov	(Azerbaijan)	DF	4 November 1990 (age 36)	Zira	2019		142	3
3	Tarlan Guliyev	(Azerbaijan)	DF	19 April 1992 (age 34)	Qarabağ	2016		133	2
4	Shahriyar Aliyev	(Azerbaijan)	DF	25 December 1992 (age 33)	Sumgayit	2020		54	3
5	Karim Diniyev	(Azerbaijan)	DF	5 September 1993 (age 33)	Zira	2021		9	0
6	Franco Flores	(Argentina)	DF	28 May 1993 (age 33)	Real España	2022	2022	34	1
8	Tural Akhundov	(Azerbaijan)	DF	1 August 1988 (age 38)	Neftçi	2020		34	1
18	Ruslan Amirjanov	(Azerbaijan)	DF	1 February 1985 (age 41)	Sabail	2018		4	1
20	Rail Malikov	(Azerbaijan)	DF	18 December 1985 (age 40)	Sumgayit	2020		1	0
22	Elchin Mustafayev	(Azerbaijan)	DF	5 July 2000 (age 26)	Sabah	2021		17	0
95	Rahman Dashdamirov	(Azerbaijan)	DF	20 October 1999 (age 27)	Academy	2021		7	0
Midfielders
7	Rahman Hajiyev	(Azerbaijan)	MF	25 July 1993 (age 33)	loan from Neftçi	2021		55	10
9	Nathan Oduwa	(Nigeria)	MF	5 March 1996 (age 30)	Unattached	2022	2022	11	0
11	Sadio Tounkara	(Mali)	MF	27 April 1992 (age 34)	Unattached	2021		39	3
13	Parviz Azadov	(Azerbaijan)	MF	19 October 2000 (age 26)	Academy	2019		25	3
14	Turan Valizade	(Azerbaijan)	MF	1 January 2001 (age 25)	loan from Neftçi	2020		45	1
19	Fahmin Muradbayli	(Azerbaijan)	MF	16 March 1996 (age 30)	loan from Neftçi	2022		8	0
50	Samir Abdullayev	(Azerbaijan)	MF	24 April 2002 (age 24)	Academy	2019		7	1
75	Vusal Qanbarov	(Azerbaijan)	MF	25 April 2003 (age 23)	Academy	2021		1	0
77	Merab Gigauri	(Georgia (country))	MF	5 January 1993 (age 33)	Gabala	2021		29	2
88	Fuad Bayramov	(Azerbaijan)	MF	20 May 1998 (age 28)	Turan-Tovuz	2021		1	0
97	Qurban Safarov	(Azerbaijan)	MF	5 September 2004 (age 22)	Academy	2021		3	0
99	Rafael Maharramli	(Azerbaijan)	MF	1 October 1999 (age 27)	Qarabağ	2021		46	0
Forwards
10	Felipe Santos	(Brazil)	FW	7 January 1997 (age 29)	Maribor	2021		25	7
29	Amil Yunanov	(Azerbaijan)	FW	6 January 1993 (age 33)	Sabail	2021		45	8
72	Aldair Neto	(Angola)	FW	22 July 1994 (age 32)	Pelister	2021		24	2
70	Bahadur Haziyev	(Azerbaijan)	FW	26 March 1999 (aged 22)	Sabail	2021		10	0
Away on loan
Left during the season
9	Anatole Abang	(Cameroon)	FW	6 July 1996 (age 30)	Sheriff Tiraspol	2020	2021	28	5
17	Oumar Goudiaby	(Senegal)	MF	1 January 1995 (age 31)	Shkupi	2021		8	0
19	Azer Salahli	(Azerbaijan)	DF	11 April 1994 (age 32)	Sumgayit	2018		73	4
21	Mijuško Bojović	(Montenegro)	DF	9 August 1988 (age 38)	Újpest	2019		45	3
23	Nijat Gurbanov	(Azerbaijan)	FW	17 February 1992 (age 34)	Samtredia	2021	2021	13	1
25	John Kamara	(Sierra Leone)	MF	12 May 1988 (age 38)	Unattached	2021		64	1

=== Out on loan ===
Note: Flags indicate national team as defined under FIFA eligibility rules; some limited exceptions apply. Players may hold more than one non-FIFA nationality.

No. / Pos. / Nation / Player	No. / Pos. / Nation / Player

== Transfers ==
=== In ===
Date	Position	Nationality	Name	From	Fee	Ref.
24 June 2021	MF	(Senegal)	Oumar Goudiaby	Shkupi	Undisclosed	
24 June 2021	FW	(Angola)	Aldair Neto	Pelister	Undisclosed	
1 July 2021	DF	(Azerbaijan)	Elçin Mustafayev	Sabah	Undisclosed	
1 July 2021	MF	(Georgia (country))	Merab Gigauri	Gabala	Free	
1 July 2021	FW	(Azerbaijan)	Amil Yunanov	Sabail	Undisclosed	
1 July 2021	FW	(Brazil)	Felipe Santos	Maribor	Undisclosed	
9 July 2021	DF	(Azerbaijan)	Karim Diniyev	Zira	Undisclosed	
23 September 2021	MF	(Mali)	Sadio Tounkara	Unattached	Free	
19 October 2021	MF	(Sierra Leone)	John Kamara	Unattached	Free	
13 January 2022	DF	(Argentina)	Franco Flores	Real España	Undisclosed	
3 February 2022	MF	(Nigeria)	Nathan Oduwa	Unattached	Free	

=== Loans in ===
Date from	Position	Nationality	Name	From	Date to	Ref.
2 June 2021	MF	(Azerbaijan)	Turan Valizade	Neftçi	End of season	
1 July 2021	MF	(Azerbaijan)	Rahman Hajiyev	Neftçi	End of season	
29 December 2021	MF	(Azerbaijan)	Fahmin Muradbayli	Neftçi	End of season	

=== Out ===
Date	Position	Nationality	Name	To	Fee	Ref.
12 June 2021	MF	(Paraguay)	César Meza	Neftçi	Undisclosed	
29 December 2021	DF	(Azerbaijan)	Azer Salahli	Neftçi	Undisclosed	

=== Released ===
Date	Position	Nationality	Name	Joined	Date	Ref
27 December 2021	MF	(Senegal)	Oumar Goudiaby			
27 December 2021	MF	(Sierra Leone)	John Kamara	Politehnica Iași	11 March 2022	
27 December 2021	FW	(Azerbaijan)	Nijat Gurbanov			
27 December 2021	FW	(Cameroon)	Anatole Abang	Al Bataeh	19 January 2022	
24 January 2022	DF	(Montenegro)	Mijuško Bojović	Inđija	28 January 2022	

== Friendlies ==
29 August 2021	Keşla	3 – 2	Sumgayit	Baku
AZT (UTC+4)	Abang 34'; Yunanov 66', 75'	Report	Mammadov 42' (pen.); Mahmudov 72'	Stadium: ASK Arena

18 January 2022	Sabail	0 – 2	Keşla	Baku
16:00 AZT (UTC+4)		Report	Yunanov; G.Safarov	Stadium: Dalga Arena

24 January 2022	Sabail	1 – 1	Keşla	Baku
15:00 AZT (UTC+4)	Goal	Report	Hajiyev	Stadium: Baku Olympic Stadium Training Field

25 January 2022	Keşla	0 – 0	Kapaz	Baku
15:30 AZT (UTC+4)		Report		Stadium: ASK Arena

== Competitions ==
=== Overview ===
Competition	First match	Last match	Starting round	Final position	Record							
Competition	First match	Last match	Starting round	Final position	Pld	W	D	L	GF	GA	GD	Win %
Premier League	14 August 2021	21 May 2022	Matchday 1	7th	28	5	7	16	25	49	−24	17.86
Azerbaijan Cup	11 December 2021	11 February 2022	First Round	Quarterfinal	3	1	0	2	2	8	−6	33.33
UEFA Europa Conference League	22 July 2021	29 July 2021	Second qualifying round	Second qualifying round	2	0	0	2	2	7	−5	0.00
Total					33	6	7	20	29	64	−35	18.18

Last updated: 21 May 2022
Source: Competitions

=== Premier League ===
==== Results summary ====
Overall								Home						Away					
Pld	W	D	L	GF	GA	GD	Pts	W	D	L	GF	GA	GD	W	D	L	GF	GA	GD
28	6	6	16	25	49	−24	24	3	4	7	12	18	−6	3	2	9	13	31	−18

Last updated: 21 May 2022.
Source: See Results

==== Results by round ====
Round	1	2	3	4	5	6	7	8	9	10	11	12	13	14	15	16	17	18	19	20	21	22	23	24	25	26	27	28
Ground	H	A	H	A	H	H	A	H	A	H	A	A	H	A	H	A	H	H	A	H	A	H	A	A	H	A	H	A
Result	L	L	L	L	D	W	W	L	L	W	L	L	D	W	L	L	D	L	W	D	D	L	L	L	D	L	L	D
Position	8	7	7	8	8	7	6	7	7	6	7	7	7	5	6	6	6	6	6	6	6	6	6	6	6	6	6	6

Updated to match(es) played on 21 May 2022. Source: See Results
A = Away; H = Home; W = Win; D = Draw; L = Loss

==== Results ====
14 August 2021 1	Keşla	0 – 2	Sumgayit	Baku
20:30 AZT (UTC+4)	Guliyev (yellow card) 53'; Gigauri (yellow card) 70'	Report	Mustafayev (yellow card) 16'; Haghverdi (yellow card) 48'; Sadikhov 83', 89' (yellow card) 83'	Stadium: ASK Arena; Referee: Kamal Umudlu

21 August 2021 2	Gabala	2 – 1	Keşla	Qabala
18:00 AZT (UTC+4)	Akakpo 11'; Utzig 30'; Vukčević (yellow card) 64'; Isayev (yellow card) 68'; E.Səfərov (yellow card) 90+2'; Alimi (yellow card) 90+5'	Report	Salahli (yellow card) 45+1'; Abang 77'; O.Goudiaby (yellow card) 80'; Aliyev (yellow card) 90+5' (red card) 90+5'	Stadium: Gabala City Stadium; Referee: Raad Ahmadov

11 September 2021 3	Keşla	0 – 2	Zira	Baku
20:15 AZT (UTC+4)	Abang (red card) 28'; E.Mustafayev (yellow card) 30'; Felipe Santos (yellow card) 83'	Report	Ramazanov (yellow card) 1'; N.Andjelkovic (yellow card) 49'; Volkovi 63', 72'; Hamdaoui (yellow card) 79'	Stadium: ASK Arena; Referee: Aliyar Ağayev

19 September 2021 4	Neftçi	3 – 0	Keşla	Baku
18:30 AZT (UTC+4)	Meza 36'; Ramon 50'; Zulfugarli 68'	Report	Gigauri (yellow card) 17'; Valizade (yellow card) 21'; Aldair (yellow card) 23'	Stadium: Eighth Kilometer District Stadium; Referee: Elcin Məsiyev

25 September 2021 5	Keşla	1 – 1	Qarabağ	Baku
17:00 AZT (UTC+4)	Tounkara (yellow card) 11'; E.Mustafayev (yellow card) 44'; Aldair 72'; Felipe Santos (yellow card) 90+3'	Report	Andrade (yellow card) 12'; Zoubir 20'	Stadium: ASK Arena; Referee: Farid Haciyev

2 October 2021 6	Keşla	2 – 0	Sabah	Baku
17:00 AZT (UTC+4)	Gigauri 3'; Tounkara (yellow card) 45+3'; Namașco (yellow card) 90+1'; Felipe Santos (yellow card) 90+3' (goal) 90+5'	Report	J.Jafarov (yellow card) 58'; Ceballos (yellow card) 86'; Seydiyev (yellow card) 88'; Rodríguez (yellow card) 90+3'	Stadium: ASK Arena; Referee: Raad Ahmadov

16 October 2021 7	Sabail	1 – 2	Keşla	Baku
15:00 AZT (UTC+4)	Manafov (yellow card) 34'; J.Arago (yellow card) 36'; Aliyev (yellow card) 67' (goal) 71'	Report	Felipe Santos (yellow card) 60'; Guliyev 68'; Abang 81' (yellow card) 86'; Namașco (yellow card) 90+2'	Stadium: Bayil Arena; Referee: Rauf Jabarov

24 October 2021 8	Keşla	2 – 3	Gabala	Baku
16:00 AZT (UTC+4)	Guliyev (yellow card) 18'; Aldair 38'; Aliyev (yellow card) 90+2'; Yunanov 90+7'	Report	Vukčević (yellow card) 17' (yellow-red card) 69'; Isayev (yellow card) 21'; Ruan 23' (yellow card) 82'; Mammadov 30'; Alimi 60'; Hani (yellow card) 90+6'	Stadium: ASK Arena; Referee: Vugar Hasanli

30 October 2021 9	Zira	2 – 0	Keşla	Zirə
16:00 AZT (UTC+4)	Brogno 17'; Ramazanov 42'; Aliyev (yellow card) 45+1'	Report	Guliyev (yellow card) 33'; Aliyev (yellow card) 79'; Akhundov (red card) 90+4'	Stadium: Zira Olympic Sport Complex Stadium; Referee: Raad Ahmadov

6 November 2021 10	Keşla	3 – 2	Neftçi	Baku
19:00 AZT (UTC+4)	Qirtimov (yellow card) 34'; Felipe Santos 41' (pen.); Hajiyev 49'; S.Aliyev (yellow card) 63'; Abang 86'; Tounkara (yellow card) 90+1'	Report	Bezerra 11', 35' (yellow card) 34'; K.Ibrahimov (yellow card) 40'	Stadium: ASK Arena; Referee: Rauf Jabarov

19 November 2021 11	Qarabağ	1 – 0	Keşla	Baku
19:00 AZT (UTC+4)	Patrick (yellow card) 42'; Sheydayev 49'	Report		Stadium: Azersun Arena; Referee: Kamal Umudlu

27 November 2021 12	Sabah	2 – 1	Keşla	Masazır
16:00 AZT (UTC+4)	Seydiyev 4'; Isayev 12'; Nuriyev (yellow card) 57'	Report	Qirtimov (yellow card) 34'; Bayramov (yellow card) 43'; Felipe Santos (yellow card) 45'; Tounkara 47'; Aldair (yellow card) 83'; Aliyev (yellow card) 90+2'; Q.Safarov (yellow card) 90+3'	Stadium: Bank Respublika Arena; Referee: Raad Ahmadov

4 December 2021 13	Keşla	2 – 2	Sabail	Baku
16:00 AZT (UTC+4)	Abang (yellow card) 1' (yellow-red card) 61' (goal) 46'; Felipe Santos 45+6' (pen.) (yellow card) 77'; Kamara (yellow card) 75'; Namașco (yellow card) 90'	Report	Amirli (yellow card) 18'; Manafov (yellow card) 23'; Amirguliyev 66'; Arago 90+5'; N.Alışov (yellow card) 90+5'	Stadium: ASK Arena; Referee: Rauf Jabarov

15 December 2021 14	Sumgayit	1 – 3	Keşla	Sumgait
19:00 AZT (UTC+4)	Mustafayev (yellow card) 80'; Khodzhaniyazov 84'	Report	Azadov 36'; Hajiyev 47'; Felipe Santos 80' (pen.)	Stadium: Kapital Bank Arena; Referee: Aliyar Ağayev

7 February 2022 15	Keşla	0 – 1	Zira	Baku
16:00 AZT (UTC+4)	Azadov (yellow card) 10'; Qirtimov (yellow card) 35' (yellow-red card) 39'; Tounkara (yellow card) 37'; Aliyev (yellow card) 44'; Gigauri (yellow card) 82'	Report	Keyta (yellow card) 31'; Hamdaoui 45'; Chantakias (yellow card) 82'	Stadium: ASK Arena; Referee: Ingilab Mammadov

19 February 2022 16	Neftçi	3 – 1	Keşla	Baku
17:15 AZT (UTC+4)	Meza 21'; Stanković 26'; R.Nəsirli 44'; A.Aliyev (yellow card) 60'; Israfilov (yellow card) 65'	Report	S.Aliyev (yellow card) 25'; Akhundov (yellow card) 55'; Q.Səfərov (yellow card) 63'; Felipe Santos 90+3'	Stadium: Eighth Kilometer District Stadium; Referee: Farid Haciyev

28 February 2022 17	Keşla	0 – 0	Qarabağ	Baku
19:15 AZT (UTC+4)	Valizade (yellow card) 56'; Haziyev (yellow card) 90'	Report	Mustafazade (yellow card) 69'	Stadium: ASK Arena; Referee: Aliyar Agayev

6 March 2022 18	Keşla	0 – 1	Sabah	Baku
17:00 AZT (UTC+4)	Hajiyev (yellow card) 29'; Tounkara (yellow card) 57'; Azadov (yellow card) 66'; Flores (yellow card) 76'; Muradbayli (yellow card) 76'	Report	Ochihava 89'; Nuriyev (yellow card) 90+2'	Stadium: ASK Arena; Referee: Ingilab Mammadov

12 March 2022 19	Sabail	0 – 3	Keşla	Bayil
16:45 AZT (UTC+4)	Hajiyev (yellow card) 24'; Arago (yellow card) 26'; Naghiyev (yellow card) 43'; Azizli (yellow card) 81'	Report	Azadov 16'; Hajiyev 21'; Valizade 90+5'	Stadium: Bayil Arena; Referee: Rauf Jabarov

18 March 2022 20	Keşla	1 – 1	Sumgayit	Baku
17:00 AZT (UTC+4)	Azadov (yellow card) 38'; Yunanov 45'; Hajiyev (yellow card) 90+5'	Report	Khodzhaniyazov (yellow card) 38'; Khachayev (yellow card) 52'; Mahmudov (yellow card) 65'; Mustafayev (yellow card) 88'	Stadium: ASK Arena; Referee: Vugar Həsənli

3 April 2022 21	Gabala	1 – 1	Keşla	Qabala
15:00 AZT (UTC+4)	Ruan (yellow card) 20'; Hani 47'	Report	Gigauri 32'; Guliyev (red card) 51'; Bayramov (yellow card) 64' (yellow-red card) 64'; Tounkara (yellow card) 90+5'	Stadium: Gabala City Stadium; Referee: Farid Haciyev

9 April 2022 22	Shamakhi	1 – 2	Neftçi	Shamakhi
14:00 AZT (UTC+4)	Hajiyev 10'; Flores (yellow card) 16'; Aldair (yellow card) 45+4'; Amirjanov (yellow card) 90+3'	Report	Pato (yellow card) 45+4'; Yusifli (yellow card) 52'; Bezerra 60'; Ramon 72'	Stadium: Şamaxı Sahar Stadium; Referee: Elcin Məsiyev
Note: On 6 April, Keşla changed their name to Shamakhi.

15 April 2022 23	Qarabağ	8 – 0	Shamakhi	Baku
19:30 AZT (UTC+4)	Wadji 8', 16', 30'; Bayramov (yellow card) 18'; Ozobić 20', 21'; Vešović (yellow card) 39'; Kady 45+2'; Gurbanlı 49'; Ibrahimli (yellow card) 72'	Report	Valizade (yellow card) 56'	Stadium: Azersun Arena; Referee: Rauf Allahverdiyev
Note: On 6 April, Keşla changed their name to Shamakhi.

24 April 2022 24	Sabah	5 – 1	Shamakhi	Masazır
18:30 AZT (UTC+4)	Mickels 11', 29' (yellow card) 62'; Ochihava 25' (yellow card) 51'; Rodríguez 84'; Isayev 89'	Report	Oduwa (yellow card) 24'; Felipe Santos 50'; Qirtimov (yellow card) 53'; Azadov (yellow card) 55'; Aliyev (yellow card) 59'; Flores (red card) 90+3'	Stadium: Bank Respublika Arena; Referee: Farid Haciyev

3 May 2022 25	Shamakhi	0 – 0	Sabail	Shamakhi
16:30 AZT (UTC+4)	E.Mustafayev (yellow card) 59'; Qirtimov (yellow card) 80'	Report	Rajsel (yellow card) 59'; H.Guliyev (yellow card) 68'; E.Tagiyev (yellow card) 79'	Stadium: Şamaxı Sahar Stadium; Referee: Ingilab Mammadov

9 May 2022 26	Sumgayit	2 – 0	Shamakhi	Sumgait
17:30 AZT (UTC+4)	Ghorbani 31', 78'; Ahmadli (yellow card) 80'; Popovich (yellow card) 90+2'	Report	Azadov (yellow card) 65'; Tounkara (yellow card) 80'	Stadium: Kapital Bank Arena; Referee: Aliyar Ağayev

15 May 2022 27	Shamakhi	0 – 1	Gabala	Baku
17:00 AZT (UTC+4)	Felipe Santos (yellow card) 11'; Gigauri (yellow card) 11'; E.Mustafayev (yellow card) 80'	Report	Ruan (yellow card) 11'; Isayev (yellow card) 11'; Mirzayev (yellow card) 11'; Alimi (yellow card) 14'; E.Səfərov 24'; López (yellow card) 45'	Stadium: ASK Arena; Referee: Elcin Masiyev

21 May 2022 28	Zira	0 – 0	Shamakhi	Zirə
17:00 AZT (UTC+4)	Hamdaoui (yellow card) 8'; Diniyev (yellow card) 24'; Taşqın (yellow card) 27'; Keyta (red card) 87'	Report	Aldair (yellow card) 24'; Felipe Santos (yellow card) 45+1'; A.Valiyev (yellow card) 90+3'	Stadium: Zira Olympic Sport Complex Stadium; Referee: Rauf Allahverdiyev

==== League table ====
Pos	Team	Pld	W	D	L	GF	GA	GD	Pts	Qualification
4	Gabala	28	12	9	7	38	34	+4	45	Qualification to Europa Conference League second qualifying round
5	Sabah	28	12	5	11	42	34	+8	41	
6	Sumgayit	28	5	7	16	22	46	−24	22 (Note: Head-to-head points: Sumgayit 7, Shamakhi 4.)	
7	Shamakhi	28	5	7	16	25	49	−24	22	
8	Sabail	28	4	3	21	17	57	−40	15	

Source: Soccerway
Rules for classification: 1) Points; 2) Head-to-head points; 3) Head-to-head goal difference; 4) Head-to-head goals scored; 5) Head-to-head away goals scored (only if two teams); 6) Goal difference; 7) Goals scored.

=== Azerbaijan Cup ===
11 December 2021 First Round	Keşla	2 – 1	Qaradağ Lökbatan	Baku
15:00 AZT (UTC+4)	S.Abdullayev 32'; Hajiyev 58'; Felipe Santos (yellow card) 88'	Report	E.Samadov 7'; S.Allahquliyev (yellow card) 13'; U.İsmayılov (yellow card) 60'	Stadium: ASK Arena; Referee: Rauf Allahverdiyev

1 February 2022 Quarterfinal 1st leg	Qarabağ	1 – 0	Keşla	Baku
17:30 AZT (UTC+4)	Ozobić (yellow card) 45+2'; Wadji 56' L.Andrade (yellow card) 79'; Bayramov (yellow card) 90+4'	Report	Muradbayli (yellow card) 14'; Flores (yellow card) 65'; Guliyev (yellow card) 90+5'	Stadium: Azersun Arena; Referee: Vuqar Hasanli

11 February 2022 Quarterfinal 2nd leg	Keşla	0 – 6 (0 – 7 agg.)	Qarabağ	Baku
18:00 AZT (UTC+4)	Gigauri (yellow card) 44'; Valizade (yellow card) 83'	Report	P.Andrade 9'; Wadji 17', 45'; Sheydayev 43' (pen.), 84'; Gurbanlı 78'	Stadium: ASK Arena; Referee: Elcin Masiyev

=== UEFA Europa Conference League ===
==== Qualifying rounds ====
22 July 2021 Second qualifying round 1st leg	Sochi (Russia)	3 – 0	(Azerbaijan) Keşla	Sochi, Russia
20:00 AZT (UTC+4)	Rodrigão 10'; Noboa 67' (pen.); Barsov 81'	Report	Gigauri (yellow card) 18'; Qirtimov (yellow card) 45'; Guliyev (yellow card) 90+5'	Stadium: Fisht Olympic Stadium; Attendance: 0 Referee: Enea Jorgji (Albania)
Note: Match played behind closed doors.

29 July 2021 Second qualifying round 2nd leg	Keşla (Azerbaijan)	2 – 4 (2 – 7 agg.)	(Russia) Sochi	Baku, Azerbaijan
20:00 AZT (UTC+4)	Felipe Santos 35'; Hajiyev 52'; Aldair (yellow card) 68'; Akhundov (yellow card) 78'	Report	Dugandžić 21', 82'; Burmistrov 38'; Prokhin 70'	Stadium: ASK Arena; Attendance: 870; Referee: Viktor Shimusik (Belarus)

== Squad statistics ==
As of match played 21 May 2022

=== Appearances and goals ===
No.	Pos	Nat	Player	Total		Premier League		Azerbaijan Cup		Europa Conference League	
No.	Pos	Nat	Player	Apps	Goals	Apps	Goals	Apps	Goals	Apps	Goals
1	GK	(Moldova) MDA	Stanislav Namașco	27	0	24	0	1	0	2	0
2	DF	(Azerbaijan) AZE	Ilkin Qirtimov	25	0	21	0	2	0	2	0
3	DF	(Azerbaijan) AZE	Tarlan Guliyev	21	1	16+1	1	2	0	2	0
4	DF	(Azerbaijan) AZE	Shahriyar Aliyev	23	0	20	0	2	0	1	0
5	DF	(Azerbaijan) AZE	Karim Diniyev	9	0	6+2	0	1	0	0	0
6	DF	(Argentina) ARG	Franco Flores	14	0	9+3	0	2	0	0	0
7	MF	(Azerbaijan) AZE	Rahman Hajiyev	27	6	21+1	4	3	1	2	1
8	DF	(Azerbaijan) AZE	Tural Akhundov	12	0	5+4	0	1	0	0+2	0
9	MF	(Nigeria) NGR	Nathan Oduwa	11	0	11	0	0	0	0	0
10	FW	(Brazil) BRA	Felipe Santos	25	7	20+1	6	2	0	2	1
11	MF	(Mali) MLI	Sadio Tounkara	22	1	20	1	2	0	0	0
13	MF	(Azerbaijan) AZE	Parviz Azadov	16	2	10+3	2	2+1	0	0	0
14	MF	(Azerbaijan) AZE	Turan Valizade	26	1	16+6	1	0+3	0	1	0
19	DF	(Azerbaijan) AZE	Fahmin Muradbayli	8	0	3+4	0	1	0	0	0
22	DF	(Azerbaijan) AZE	Elçin Mustafayev	16	0	10+2	0	1+2	0	0+1	0
27	GK	(Azerbaijan) AZE	Akbar Valiyev	1	0	1	0	0	0	0	0
29	FW	(Azerbaijan) AZE	Amil Yunanov	18	2	3+12	2	1	0	1+1	0
50	MF	(Azerbaijan) AZE	Samir Abdullayev	7	1	1+5	0	1	1	0	0
70	FW	(Azerbaijan) AZE	Bahadur Haziyev	5	0	0+4	0	0+1	0	0	0
72	FW	(Angola) ANG	Aldair Neto	24	2	17+4	2	1	0	2	0
75	MF	(Azerbaijan) AZE	Vusal Qanbarov	1	0	0+1	0	0	0	0	0
77	MF	(Georgia (country)) GEO	Merab Gigauri	29	2	23+1	2	3	0	2	0
85	GK	(Azerbaijan) AZE	Kamal Bayramov	6	0	3+1	0	2	0	0	0
88	MF	(Azerbaijan) AZE	Fuad Bayramov	1	0	1	0	0	0	0	0
95	DF	(Azerbaijan) AZE	Rahman Dashdamirov	7	0	5+1	0	0+1	0	0	0
97	MF	(Azerbaijan) AZE	Qurban Safarov	3	0	0+3	0	0	0	0	0
99	MF	(Azerbaijan) AZE	Rafael Maharramli	22	0	14+4	0	2	0	0+2	0
Players away on loan:
Players who left Keşla during the season:
9	FW	(Cameroon) CMR	Anatole Abang	10	4	9+1	4	0	0	0	0
17	MF	(Senegal) SEN	Oumar Goudiaby	8	0	1+6	0	0	0	1	0
19	DF	(Azerbaijan) AZE	Azer Salahli	15	0	12	0	0+1	0	2	0
21	DF	(Montenegro) MNE	Mijuško Bojović	8	0	4+1	0	1	0	2	0
25	MF	(Sierra Leone) SLE	John Kamara	4	0	1+3	0	0	0	0	0

=== Goal scorers ===
Place	Position	Nation	Number	Name	Premier League	Azerbaijan Cup	Europa Conference League	Total
1	FW	(Brazil)	10	Felipe Santos	6	0	1	7
2	MF	(Azerbaijan)	7	Rahman Hajiyev	4	1	1	6
3	FW	(Cameroon)	9	Anatole Abang	4	0	0	4
4	FW	(Angola)	72	Aldair Neto	2	0	0	2
4	MF	(Azerbaijan)	13	Parviz Azadov	2	0	0	2
4	FW	(Azerbaijan)	29	Amil Yunanov	2	0	0	2
4	MF	(Georgia (country))	77	Merab Gigauri	2	0	0	2
8	DF	(Azerbaijan)	3	Tarlan Guliyev	1	0	0	1
8	MF	(Mali)	11	Sadio Tounkara	1	0	0	1
8	MF	(Azerbaijan)	14	Turan Valizade	1	0	0	1
8	MF	(Azerbaijan)	50	Samir Abdullayev	0	1	0	1
				TOTALS	25	2	2	29

=== Clean sheets ===
Place	Position	Nation	Number	Name	Premier League	Azerbaijan Cup	Europa Conference League	Total
1	GK	(Moldova)	1	Stanislav Namașco	4	0	0	4
2	GK	(Azerbaijan)	27	Akbar Valiyev	1	0	0	1
				TOTALS	5	0	0	5

=== Disciplinary record ===
Number	Nation	Position	Name	Premier League		Azerbaijan Cup		Europa Conference League		Total	
Number	Nation	Position	Name	Yellow card	Red card	Yellow card	Red card	Yellow card	Red card	Yellow card	Red card
1	(Moldova)	GK	Stanislav Namașco	3	0	0	0	0	0	3	0
2	(Azerbaijan)	DF	Ilkin Qirtimov	6	1	0	0	1	0	7	1
3	(Azerbaijan)	DF	Tarlan Guliyev	3	1	0	0	1	0	4	1
4	(Azerbaijan)	DF	Shahriyar Aliyev	9	1	0	0	0	0	9	1
6	(Argentina)	DF	Franco Flores	2	1	1	0	0	0	3	1
7	(Azerbaijan)	MF	Rahman Hajiyev	2	0	0	0	0	0	2	0
8	(Azerbaijan)	DF	Tural Akhundov	1	1	0	0	1	0	2	1
9	(Nigeria)	MF	Nathan Oduwa	1	0	0	0	0	0	1	0
10	(Brazil)	FW	Felipe Santos	8	0	1	0	0	0	9	0
11	(Mali)	MF	Sadio Tounkara	7	0	0	0	0	0	7	0
13	(Azerbaijan)	MF	Parviz Azadov	5	0	0	0	0	0	5	0
14	(Azerbaijan)	MF	Turan Valizade	3	0	1	0	1	0	5	0
18	(Azerbaijan)	DF	Ruslan Amirjanov	1	0	0	0	0	0	1	0
19	(Azerbaijan)	MF	Fahmin Muradbayli	1	0	1	0	0	0	2	0
22	(Azerbaijan)	DF	Elchin Mustafayev	4	0	0	0	0	0	4	0
27	(Azerbaijan)	GK	Akbar Valiyev	1	0	0	0	0	0	1	0
70	(Azerbaijan)	FW	Bahadur Haziyev	1	0	0	0	0	0	1	0
72	(Angola)	FW	Aldair Neto	4	0	0	0	1	0	5	0
77	(Georgia (country))	MF	Merab Gigauri	4	0	1	0	1	0	6	0
79	(Azerbaijan)	FW	Bahadur Haziyev	0	0	1	0	0	0	1	0
85	(Azerbaijan)	GK	Kamal Bayramov	3	1	0	0	0	0	3	1
97	(Azerbaijan)	MF	Qurban Safarov	2	0	0	0	0	0	2	0
Players who left Keşla during the season:
9	(Cameroon)	FW	Anatole Abang	4	2	0	0	0	0	4	2
17	(Senegal)	MF	Oumar Goudiaby	1	0	0	0	0	0	1	0
19	(Azerbaijan)	DF	Azer Salahli	1	0	0	0	0	0	1	0
25	(Sierra Leone)	MF	John Kamara	1	0	0	0	0	0	1	0
			TOTALS	78	8	6	0	5	0	89	8
