= 2017 FC Bunyodkor season =

FC Bunyodkor
2017 season
- Chairman: Bedil Alimov
- Manager: Sergey Lushan (until 5 May 2017); Mirjalol Qosimov (from 5 May 2017)
- Uzbek League: 4th
- Uzbekistan Cup: runners-up
- AFC Champions League: Group Stage
- Top goalscorer: League: Dostonbek Khamdamov (14); All: Dostonbek Khamdamov (19)
Home colours	Away colours

The 2017 season is Bunyodkors 11th season in the Uzbek League in Uzbekistan.

== Season events ==
On 5 May Sergey Lushan was sacked by Bunyodkor, being replaced by Mirjalol Qosimov.

== Squad ==
As of 3 August 2017

Note: Flags indicate national team as defined under FIFA eligibility rules; some limited exceptions apply. Players may hold more than one non-FIFA nationality.

No.	Pos.	Nation	Player
2	DF	UZB	Rustam Ashurmatov
3	DF	UZB	Islom Kobilov
4	DF	UZB	Akram Komilov
6	DF	UZB	Anvar Gafurov
8	MF	UZB	Jovlon Ibrokhimov
9	FW	UZB	Shahzodbek Nurmatov
11	FW	MDA	Vadim Cemîrtan
14	MF	UZB	Vokhid Shodiev
16	MF	UZB	Alisher Sanayev
17	MF	UZB	Dostonbek Khamdamov
18	MF	UZB	Sardor Sabirkhodjaev
19	MF	UZB	Nurillo Tukhtasinov
21	MF	UZB	Dilshodbek Axmadaliev

No.	Pos.	Nation	Player
22	MF	UZB	Shohrux Gadoyev
25	GK	UZB	Murod Zukhurov
28	DF	UZB	Davronbek Umirov
29	MF	UZB	Otabek Shukurov
30	MF	UZB	Khursid Giyosov
32	GK	UZB	Suhrobjon Sultonov
35	GK	UZB	Abdukarim Mukhammedov
44	MF	UZB	Mirjamol Kosimov
50	MF	UZB	Farrukh Ikramov
54	FW	UZB	Mirjakhon Mirakhmadov
59	MF	UZB	Sukhrob Izzatov
77	FW	UZB	Shokhruz Norkhonov

=== Out on loan ===
Note: Flags indicate national team as defined under FIFA eligibility rules; some limited exceptions apply. Players may hold more than one non-FIFA nationality.

No.	Pos.	Nation	Player
20	MF	UZB	Sardorbek Azimov (at Navbahor Namangan)
45	GK	UZB	Dilshod Khamraev (at Navbahor Namangan)

=== Technical staff ===
Position	Name
Head coach	(Russia) Sergey Lushan
Assistant coach	(Uzbekistan) Yuriy Sarkisyan
Assistant coach	(Ukraine) Amet Memet
Assistant coach	(Uzbekistan) Mukhiddin Ortikov
Fitness coach	(Romania) Augustin Chiriță
Goalkeeping coach	(Uzbekistan) Abdusattor Rakhimov
Club doctor	(Uzbekistan) Qakhramon Nurmukhammedov

== Transfers ==
=== Winter ===
In: Note: Flags indicate national team as defined under FIFA eligibility rules; some limited exceptions apply. Players may hold more than one non-FIFA nationality.

No.	Pos.	Nation	Player
3	DF	UZB	Islom Kobilov (from (Uzbekistan) Metallurg Bekabad)
7	MF	SRB	Dušan Mićić (from (Serbia) Vojvodina)
11	FW	MDA	Vadim Cemîrtan (from (Uzbekistan) Buxoro)
16	MF	UZB	Alisher Sanayev (from (Uzbekistan) Buxoro)
23	FW	UZB	Nodirhon Kamolov (from (Uzbekistan) Qizilqum Zarafshon)
30	MF	UZB	Khursid Giyosov (loan return from (Uzbekistan) Obod Tashkent)
97	FW	UZB	Javoxir Esonkulov (from (Uzbekistan) Metallurg Bekabad)

Out: Note: Flags indicate national team as defined under FIFA eligibility rules; some limited exceptions apply. Players may hold more than one non-FIFA nationality.

No.	Pos.	Nation	Player
1	GK	UZB	Pavel Bugalo (Retired)
2	DF	UZB	Akmal Shorakhmedov (to (Uzbekistan) Nasaf Qarshi)
3	DF	UZB	Islom Kobilov (loan to (Uzbekistan) Metallurg Bekabad)
4	DF	UZB	Hayrulla Karimov (Retired)
9	MF	JPN	Minori Sato (to (Qatar) Muaither)
14	FW	UZB	Bahodir Nasimov (to (South Korea) Ansan Greeners)
19	FW	UZB	Zabikhillo Urinboev
22	MF	UZB	Shohrux Gadoyev (to (Uzbekistan) Buxoro)
30	DF	CRO	Jurica Buljat (to (Uzbekistan) Pakhtakor Tashkent)
45	GK	UZB	Akbar Turaev (to (Uzbekistan) Olmaliq)
71	MF	SRB	Aleksandar Alempijević
77	MF	UZB	Viktor Karpenko
—	MF	UZB	Sanjar Kodirkulov (loan to (Uzbekistan) Metallurg Bekabad)

=== Summer ===
In: Note: Flags indicate national team as defined under FIFA eligibility rules; some limited exceptions apply. Players may hold more than one non-FIFA nationality.

No.	Pos.	Nation	Player
3	DF	UZB	Islom Kobilov (loan return from (Uzbekistan) Metallurg Bekabad)
6	DF	UZB	Anvar Gafurov (from (Uzbekistan) Obod)
14	MF	UZB	Vokhid Shodiev (from (Uzbekistan) Qizilqum Zarafshon)
18	MF	UZB	Sardor Sabirkhodjaev (from (Uzbekistan) Shurtan Guzar)
22	MF	UZB	Shohrux Gadoyev (from (Uzbekistan) Buxoro)
32	GK	UZB	Suhrobjon Sultonov (from (Uzbekistan) Metallurg Bekabad)
77	FW	UZB	Shokhruz Norkhonov (from (Uzbekistan) Obod)

Out: Note: Flags indicate national team as defined under FIFA eligibility rules; some limited exceptions apply. Players may hold more than one non-FIFA nationality.

No.	Pos.	Nation	Player
5	DF	UZB	Javlon Mirabdullaev
7	MF	SRB	Dušan Mićić (to (Serbia) Radnik Surdulica)
10	FW	UZB	Eldor Shomurodov (to (Russia) Rostov)
20	MF	UZB	Sardorbek Azimov (loan to (Uzbekistan) Navbahor Namangan)
23	FW	UZB	Nodirhon Kamolov (to (Uzbekistan) Qizilqum Zarafshon)
45	GK	UZB	Dilshod Khamraev (loan to (Uzbekistan) Navbahor Namangan)
97	FW	UZB	Javoxir Esonkulov (to (Uzbekistan) Metallurg Bekabad)

== Competitions ==
=== Uzbek League ===
==== League table ====
Pos	Team	Pld	W	D	L	GF	GA	GD	Pts	Qualification or relegation
2	Nasaf	30	20	2	8	58	18	+40	62	Qualification to the 2018 AFC Champions League qualifying play-off
3	Pakhtakor	30	18	5	7	44	28	+16	59	Qualification to the 2018 AFC Champions League qualifying play-off
4	Bunyodkor	30	14	10	6	47	29	+18	52	
5	Navbahor	30	12	10	8	40	37	+3	46	
6	Bukhoro	30	13	7	10	42	40	+2	46	

Updated to match(es) played on 5 November 2017. Source: Uzbekistan Professional Football League
Rules for classification: 1) points; 2) goal difference; 3) number of goals scored.

==== Results summary ====
Overall								Home						Away					
Pld	W	D	L	GF	GA	GD	Pts	W	D	L	GF	GA	GD	W	D	L	GF	GA	GD
30	14	10	6	43	27	+16	52	10	4	1	23	8	+15	4	6	5	20	19	+1

Last updated: 25 November 2017.
Source: See Results

==== Results by round ====
Round	1	2	3	4	5	6	7	8	9	10	11	12	13	14	15	16	17	18	19	20	21	22	23	24	25	26	27	28	29	30
Ground	H	A	A	H	A	H	A	H	A	H	A	H	A	H	H	A	H	A	H	A	H	A	H	A	H	A	H	A	H	A
Result	W	D	D	L	W	D	L	D	L	D	D	W	L	W	W	D	W	W	W	D	W	W	W	D	W	L	D	W	W	L
Position	5	5	8	12	9	8	9	11	12	11	12	12	13	12	7	8	6	6	4	6	5	5	4	4	4	4	4	4	4	4

Source: See Results
A = Away; H = Home; W = Win; D = Draw; L = Loss

==== Results ====
4 March 2017 1	Bunyodkor	1 – 0	Sogdiana Jizzakh	Tashkent
18:00 UZT (UTC+5)	D.Axmadaliev (yellow card) 22'; Komilov (yellow card) 77'; Khamdamov 79'	Report	S.Mamadaliyev (yellow card) 37'	Stadium: Bunyodkor Stadium; Attendance: 509; Referee: Olim Talibdjanov

9 March 2017 2	Olmaliq	0 – 0	Bunyodkor	Olmaliq
15:00 UZT (UTC+5)	Inomov (yellow card) 61'; Juraev (yellow card) 67'	Report	Mićić (yellow card) 14'	Stadium: Almalyk MMC sports complex Attendance: 4,950; Referee: Khasan Ruziev

18 March 2017 3	Bunyodkor	v	Nasaf Qarshi	Tashkent
17:00 UZT (UTC+5)				Stadium: Bunyodkor Stadium

30 March 2017 4	Obod	1 – 1	Bunyodkor	Tashkent
17:00 UZT (UTC+5)	S.Norxonov 22'; D.Hasanov (yellow card) 82'	Report	D.Axmadaliev (yellow card) 40'; Cemîrtan 76'	Stadium: JAR Stadium; Attendance: 721; Referee: Vadim Agishev

6 April 2017 5	Bunyodkor	0 – 1	Qizilqum Zarafshon	Tashkent
15:00 UZT (UTC+5)	Mićić (yellow card) 18'	Report	I.Yunusov 41'; Hasanov (yellow card) 61'; F.Kambarov (yellow card) 63'; S.Pulatov (yellow card) 69'; S.Djuraev (yellow card) 86'	Stadium: Bunyodkor Stadium; Attendance: 507; Referee: Ilgiz Tantashev

16 April 2017 6	Neftchi Fergana	1 – 2	Bunyodkor	Fergana
17:00 UZT (UTC+5)	D.Irmatov (yellow card) 13'; A.Abdulkhakov 50'; Kantsavy (yellow card) 79'	Report	Khamdamov 48'; D.Axmadaliev 75'	Stadium: Istiqlol Stadium; Attendance: 2,810; Referee: Zokir Kadyrov

20 April 2017 7	Bunyodkor	1 – 1	Dinamo Samarqand	Tashkent
18:00 UZT (UTC+5)	D.Umirov (yellow card) 24'; Khamdamov 26'; S.Azimov (yellow card) 63'; Shomurodov (yellow card) 79'	Report	J.Kaxramonov 21'	Stadium: Bunyodkor Stadium; Attendance: 705; Referee: Timur Tukhtasinov

29 April 2017 8	Mash'al Mubarek	1 – 0	Bunyodkor	Muborak
17:30 UZT (UTC+5)	S.Shaymanov (yellow card) 37'; Z.Turaev (yellow card) 40' (goal) 82'; A.Agaliev (yellow card) 40'; J.Ilyosov (yellow card) 90'	Report	D.Umirov (yellow card) 37'; Komilov (yellow card) 40'; Khamdamov (yellow card) 40'	Stadium: Bahrom Vafoev Stadium; Attendance: 2,896; Referee: Vladislav Tseytlin

3 May 2015 9	Bunyodkor	1 – 1	Metallurg Bekabad	Tashkent
19:00 UZT (UTC+5)	Khamdamov 9'; N.Tukhtasinov (yellow card) 53'	Report	A.Ziyavutdinov 51'	Stadium: Bunyodkor Stadium; Attendance: 345; Referee: Dmitiry Pisligin

12 May 2017 10	Shurtan Guzar	1 – 0	Bunyodkor	G‘uzor
16:00 UZT (UTC+5)	U.Eshmuradov 15'	Report		Stadium: G'uzor Stadium; Attendance: 3,221; Referee: Aziz Asymov

17 May 2017 11	Bunyodkor	1 – 1	Pakhtakor Tashkent	Tashkent
19:00 UZT (UTC+5)	Khamdamov 11'; Ashurmatov (yellow card) 58'; Komilov (yellow card) 62'	Report	Tajiev (yellow card) 45+1'; Andreev 71'; Orahovac (yellow card) 82'	Stadium: Bunyodkor Stadium; Attendance: 2,123; Referee: Khasan Ruziev

27 May 2017 12	Navbahor Namangan	1 – 1	Bunyodkor	Namangan
19:00 UZT (UTC+5)	A.Otakhonov (yellow card) 38'; M.Saidov (yellow card) 69'; D.Djabbarov 82'	Report	D.Umirov (yellow card) 13'; Shomurodov (yellow card) 28'; Khamdamov 67'; Shukurov (yellow card) 90'	Stadium: Markaziy Stadium; Attendance: 7,481; Referee: Vladislav seytlin

16 June 2017 13	Bunyodkor	2 – 1	Kokand 1912	Tashkent
19:00 UZT (UTC+5)	Khamdamov 6', 63'; Shukurov (yellow card) 51'; F.Ikramov (yellow card) 70'	Report	Otakuziev 21'; A.Sidorov (yellow card) 85'; M.Kholmukhamedov (yellow card) 86'	Stadium: Bunyodkor Stadium; Attendance: 1,912; Referee: Vadim Agishev

20 June 2017 14	Buxoro	4 – 2	Bunyodkor	Bukhara
15:00 UZT (UTC+5)	Bayenko (yellow card) 18'; N.Tukhtasinov 23' (o.g.); Nagaev 25'; S.Shikhov 38'; N.Umurov 79'	Report	D.Axmadaliev (yellow card) 37'; Khamdamov 66'; Cemîrtan 90+3'	Stadium: Buxoro Arena; Attendance: 12,108; Referee: Olim Talibdjanov

26 June 2017 15	Bunyodkor	1 – 0	Lokomotiv Tashkent	Tashkent
19:00 UZT (UTC+5)	Nurmatov 71'	Report	Kone (yellow card) 33'	Stadium: Bunyodkor Stadium; Attendance: 818; Referee: Vladislav Tseytlin

1 July 2017 16	Sogdiana Jizzakh	v	Bunyodkor	Jizzakh
16:00 UZT (UTC+5)				Stadium: Sogdiana Stadium

4 July 2017 3	Bunyodkor	3 – 2	Nasaf Qarshi	Tashkent
19:00 UZT (UTC+5)	Shomurodov 21'; D.Axmadaliev (yellow card) 59' (goal) 90'; Nurmatov 61'; S.Izzatov (yellow card) 83'	Report	A.Ganiev (yellow card) 32'; B.Abdurakhimov 35'; Rakhmatullaev (yellow card) 43'; Ćeran 84'	Stadium: Bunyodkor Stadium; Attendance: 1,712; Referee: Ravshan Irmatov

8 July 2017 17	Bunyodkor	v	Olmaliq	Tashkent
16:00 UZT (UTC+5)				Stadium: Bunyodkor Stadium

15 July 2017 18	Nasaf Qarshi	v	Bunyodkor	Qarshi
UZT (UTC+5)		Report		Stadium: Markaziy Stadium

6 August 2017 16	Sogdiana Jizzakh	0 – 0	Bunyodkor	Jizzakh
19:00 UZT (UTC+5)	E.Oripov (yellow card) 59'; M.Abdullaev (yellow card) 82'	Report	Khamdamov (yellow card) 56'; D.Umirov (yellow card) 73' (yellow-red card) 90+1'; Nurmatov (yellow card) 82'	Stadium: Sogdiana Stadium; Attendance: 3,600; Referee: Khasan Ruziev

11 August 2017 17	Bunyodkor	1 – 0	Olmaliq	Tashkent
17:00 UZT (UTC+5)	Shukurov 30' (yellow card) 89'; S.Sultonov (yellow card) 60'	Report		Stadium: Bunyodkor Stadium; Attendance: 678; Referee: Ilgiz Tantashev

18 August 2017 18	Nasaf Qarshi	0 – 1	Bunyodkor	Qarshi
19:30 UZT (UTC+5)	A.Ganiev (yellow card) 33'; Erkinov (yellow card) 43'	Report	Gadoyev (yellow card) 19'; Ibrokhimov (yellow card) 32'; Shukurov 34' (pen.) (yellow card) 89'; Komilov (yellow card) 43'	Stadium: Markaziy Stadium; Attendance: 8,517; Referee: Zokir Kadyrov

26 August 2017 19	Bunyodkor	2 – 0	Obod	Tashkent
19:00 UZT (UTC+5)	Norkhonov 20'; Khamdamov 77'; D.Umirov (yellow card) 79'	Report		Stadium: Bunyodkor Stadium; Attendance: 612; Referee: Timur Tukhtasinov

8 September 2017 20	Qizilqum Zarafshon	3 – 3	Bunyodkor	Navoiy
17:00 UZT (UTC+5)	S.Pulatov (yellow card) 70'; O.Zokirov 79'; F.Kambarov 82'; Geworkýan 87'	Report	Komilov (yellow card) 24'; Shodiev 29'; Khamdamov 40'; S.Sultonov (yellow card) 54'; Ashurmatov (yellow card) 60'; Gafurov (yellow card) 62'; Gadoyev 83'	Stadium: Yoshlar Stadium; Attendance: 5,753; Referee: Viktor Serazetdinov

15 September 2017 21	Bunyodkor	2 – 0	Neftchi Fergana	Tashkent
18:00 UZT (UTC+5)	Komilov 16'; Shodiev 51'	Report	A.Shogulyamov (yellow card) 66'	Stadium: Bunyodkor Stadium; Attendance: 678; Referee: Vladislav Tseytlin

21 September 2017 22	Dinamo Samarqand	0 – 2	Bunyodkor	Samarkand
16:15 UZT (UTC+5)	J.Azimov (yellow card) 37'; M.Lokaev (yellow card) 65'	Report	Ashurmatov 5', 47'; Gadoyev (yellow card) 37'	Stadium: Dinamo Samarkand Stadium; Attendance: 4,112; Referee: Timur Tukhtasinov

30 September 2017 23	Bunyodkor	4 – 0	Mash'al Mubarek	Tashkent
17:00 UZT (UTC+5)	Norkhonov 26'; Shukurov 31', 37'; Khamdamov 34'; M.Kosimov (yellow card) 70'	Report	Tymonyuk (yellow card) 19'; A.Begimkulov (yellow card) 30'; A.Olimov (yellow card) 43'	Stadium: Bunyodkor Stadium; Attendance: 372; Referee: Ravshan Irmatov

14 October 2017 24	Metallurg Bekabad	1 – 1	Bunyodkor	Bekabad
17:00 UZT (UTC+5)	Z.Abdullayev 73' (yellow card) 80'; D.Karimov (yellow card) 90'	Report	Shukurov (yellow card) 90+1'; F.Ikramov 90+3'	Stadium: Metallurg Bekabad Stadium; Attendance: 1,235; Referee: Timur Tukhtasinov

21 October 2017 25	Bunyodkor	3 – 1	Shurtan Guzar	Tashkent
17:00 UZT (UTC+5)	Shodiev 15'; M.Kosimov 36'; Khamdamov (yellow card) 51'; Ashurmatov 74'	Report	Melziddinov 52'	Stadium: Bunyodkor Stadium; Attendance: 593; Referee: Zokir Kadyrov

26 October 2017 26	Pakhtakor Tashkent	1 – 0	Bunyodkor	Tashkent
18:00 UZT (UTC+5)	Tajiev 84'; A.Akhmedov (yellow card) 88'; Kozak (yellow card) 90+2'	Report	Nurmatov (yellow card) 63'; Ashurmatov (yellow card) 68'; Komilov (yellow card) 68'; Norkhonov (yellow card) 87'	Stadium: Pakhtakor Markaziy Stadium; Attendance: 5,251; Referee: Aziz Asymov

3 November 2017 27	Bunyodkor	2 – 2	Navbahor Namangan	Tashkent
17:00 UZT (UTC+5)	Khamdamov 15' (pen.); Kobilov (yellow card) 36'; Shodiev 74' (yellow card) 80'; M.Kosimov (yellow card) 81'	Report	A.Turgunbayev 19'; A.Makhsatalliev (yellow card) 53'; D.Mekhmonov (yellow card) 87'; A.Aliyev 90'	Stadium: Bunyodkor Stadium; Attendance: 728; Referee: Ilgiz Tantashev

9 November 2017 28	Kokand 1912	2 – 5	Bunyodkor	Kokand
15:00 UZT (UTC+5)	S.Berdyev 14'; J.Sidikov 87'	Report	M.Kosimov 5'; D.Axmadaliev 48'; Gafurov 59'; Shukurov 69'; Gadoyev 72'	Stadium: Kokand Stadium; Attendance: 4,000; Referee: Zokir Kadyrov

19 November 2017 29	Bunyodkor	3 – 0	Buxoro	Tashkent
14:00 UZT (UTC+5)	Gadoyev 12', 57'; M.Kosimov (yellow card) 36'; Kobilov 62'	Report	S.Shikhov (yellow card) 75'; A.Samatov (yellow card) 76'; Bayenko (yellow card) 90+3'	Stadium: Bunyodkor Stadium; Attendance: 712; Referee: Ravshan Irmatov

25 November 2017 30	Lokomotiv Tashkent	3 – 2	Bunyodkor	Tashkent
14:00 UZT (UTC+5)	Kone (yellow card) 22'; Mirzaev 27'; Davlatov (yellow card) 30'; Muyiwa 47' (pen.); Bikmaev 71' (pen.); S.Mustafoev (yellow card) 79'	Report	Kobilov (yellow card) 16'; Khamdamov 33'; Gafurov (yellow card) 42'; Ashurmatov (yellow card) 47'; Komilov 77'	Stadium: Lokomotiv Stadium; Attendance: 2,063; Referee: Viktor Serazetdinov

=== Uzbek Cup ===
22 May 2017 Round of 16, 1st leg	Shurtan Guzar	0 – 2	Bunyodkor	G‘uzor
18:30 UZT (UTC+5)		Report	Khamdamov 72'; F.Ikramov 85'	Stadium: G'uzor Stadium; Attendance: 4,541; Referee: Rustam Bobomuradov

31 May 2017 Round of 16, 2nd leg	Bunyodkor	3 – 0 (5 – 0 agg.)	Shurtan Guzar	Tashkent
19:00 UZT (UTC+5)	N.Tukhtasinov 33'; Khamdamov 50' (pen.); Nurmatov 76'	Report	E.Tadjibaev (yellow card) 49'	Stadium: Bunyodkor Stadium; Attendance: 589; Referee: Ilgiz Tantashev

30 June 2017 Quarterfinal, 1st leg	Neftchi Fargʻona	1 – 2	Bunyodkor	Fergana
18:00 UZT (UTC+5)	D.Irmatov (yellow card) 35'; A.Ismailov (yellow card) 56'; M.Muzaffarov 70' (pen.); M.Mamazulunov (yellow card) 77'	Report	Khamdamov 43'; M.Kosimov 89'	Stadium: Istiqlol Stadium; Attendance: 1,128; Referee: Timur Tukhtasinov

27 July 2017 Quarterfinal, 2nd leg	Bunyodkor	3 – 1 (5 – 2 agg.)	Neftchi Fargʻona	Tashkent
19:00 UZT (UTC+5)	Cemîrtan 45+1'; M.Kosimov (yellow card) 57'; Khamdamov 58'; Shukurov 68'	Report	M.Muzaffarov 37' (pen.); A.Shogulyamov (yellow card) 69'; A.Abdulkhakov (yellow card) 90+1'; D.Irmatov (yellow card) 90+3'	Stadium: Bunyodkor Stadium; Attendance: 857; Referee: Valentin Kovalenko

31 July 2017 Semifinal, 1st leg	Bunyodkor	0 – 0	Dinamo Samarqand	Tashkent
18:00 UZT (UTC+5)	Kobilov (yellow card) 42'; Gafurov (yellow card) 80'; Khamdamov (yellow card) 84'	Report	Rogac (yellow card) 60'	Stadium: Bunyodkor Stadium; Attendance: 1,127; Referee: Aziz Asymov

6 October 2017 Semifinal, 2nd leg	Dinamo Samarqand	0 – 2 (0 – 2 agg.)	Bunyodkor	Samarkand
14:00 UZT (UTC+5)	A.Safarov (yellow card) 24' (yellow-red card) 41'; Juraev (yellow card) 58'; S.Sulaymonov (yellow card) 74'; M.Isayev (yellow card) 82'; J.Azimov (yellow card) 90'	Report	Shukurov 19'; M.Kosimov 45'; D.Axmadaliev (yellow card) 45+1'	Stadium: Dinamo Samarkand Stadium; Attendance: 3,123; Referee: Zokir Kadyrov

==== Final ====
4 December 2017	Lokomotiv Tashkent	1 – 0	Bunyodkor	Tashkent
15:00 UZT (UTC+5)	Bikmaev 7' (yellow card) 80'; Masharipov (yellow card) 24'; Mirzaev (yellow card) 89'; Nesterov (yellow card) 90+3'	Report	Shukurov (yellow card) 90'	Stadium: Bunyodkor Stadium; Referee: Mohammed Abdulla Hassan Mohammed

=== AFC Champions League ===
==== Play-off round ====
7 February 2017	El Jaish (Qatar)	0 – 0 (a.e.t.) (1 – 1 p)	(Uzbekistan) Bunyodkor	Doha, Qatar
20:15 UZT (UTC+5)		Report		Stadium: Abdullah bin Khalifa Stadium; Attendance: 1,150; Referee: Adham Makhadmeh (Jordan)
	Penalties
	Romarinho (penalty missed); Rashidov (penalty missed); Mothnani (penalty scored); Siddiq (penalty missed)		Khamdamov (penalty scored); Ashurmatov (penalty scored); Shomurodov (penalty scored)

==== Group stage ====
Pos	Team	Pld	W	D	L	GF	GA	GD	Pts	Qualification
1	(United Arab Emirates) Al-Ain	6	3	3	0	14	7	+7	12	Advance to knockout stage
2	(Saudi Arabia) Al-Ahli	6	3	2	1	10	7	+3	11	Advance to knockout stage
3	(Iran) Zob Ahan	6	2	1	3	6	9	−3	7	
4	(Uzbekistan) Bunyodkor	6	1	0	5	5	12	−7	3	

Source: AFC

21 February 2017 1	Al-Ahli (Saudi Arabia)	2 – 0	(Uzbekistan) Bunyodkor	Jeddah, Saudi Arabia
22:15 UZT (UTC+5)	Al Somah 13'; Al-Moasher 53'; Al-Bassas (yellow card) 83'	Report	D.Axmadaliev (yellow card) 67'; Ibrokhimov (yellow card) 90+2'	Stadium: King Abdullah Sports City, Attendance: 11,315; Referee: Ryuji Sato (Japan)

28 February 2017 2	Bunyodkor (Uzbekistan)	2 – 3	(United Arab Emirates) Al-Ain	Tashkent, Uzbekistan
18:00 UZT (UTC+5)	Cemîrtan 10' (yellow card) 27'; N.Tukhtasinov (yellow card) 30'; Khamdamov 43'; Komilov (yellow card) 67' (yellow-red card) 72'; Ashurmatov (yellow card) 90+2'	Report	Abdulrahman 8', 89' (pen.); Caio 15'; Barman (yellow card) 44'	Stadium: Bunyodkor Stadium, Attendance: 4,339; Referee: Jarred Gillett (Australia)

13 March 2017 3	Bunyodkor (Uzbekistan)	0 – 2	(Iran) Zob Ahan	Tashkent, Uzbekistan
18:00 UZT (UTC+5)	Cemîrtan (red card) 63'; A.Sanayev (yellow card) 90+5'	Report	Bengtson 55'; Tabrizi 90+6'	Stadium: Bunyodkor Stadium, Referee: Liu Kwok Man (Hong Kong)

11 April 2017 4	Zob Ahan (Iran)	2 – 1	(Uzbekistan) Bunyodkor	Isfahan, Iran
20:30 UZT (UTC+5)	Mohammadzadeh 5'; Tabrizi 54'	Report	Shukurov (yellow card) 71'; Nurmatov 72'	Stadium: Foolad Shahr Stadium; Attendance: 3,833; Referee: Muhammad Taqi (Singapore)

24 April 2017 5	Bunyodkor (Uzbekistan)	2 – 0	(Saudi Arabia) Al-Ahli	Tashkent, Uzbekistan
UZT (UTC+5)	Komilov 8'; Shomurodov 54'; M.Kosimov (yellow card) 62'; D.Axmadaliev (yellow card) 68'	Report		Stadium: Bunyodkor Stadium; Attendance: 1,307; Referee: Fu Ming (China)

8 May 2017 6	Al-Ain (United Arab Emirates)	3 – 0	(Uzbekistan) Bunyodkor	Al Ain, United Arab Emirates
20:40 UZT (UTC+5)	Al-Shamrani 34'; Khalfan (yellow card) 66'; O.Abdulrahman 76'; Diaky 90+1'	Report	M.Kosimov (yellow card) 29'; Ashurmatov (yellow card) 55'; D.Umirov (yellow card) 61'	Stadium: Hazza Bin Zayed Stadium; Attendance: 6,244; Referee: Khamis Al-Marri (Qatar)

== Squad statistics ==
As of match played 25 November 2017

=== Appearances and goals ===
No.	Pos	Nat	Player	Total		Uzbek League		Uzbek Cup		Champions League	
No.	Pos	Nat	Player	Apps	Goals	Apps	Goals	Apps	Goals	Apps	Goals
2	DF	(Uzbekistan) UZB	Rustam Ashurmatov	36	3	24	3	5	0	7	0
3	DF	(Uzbekistan) UZB	Islom Kobilov	12	1	10	1	2	0	0	0
4	DF	(Uzbekistan) UZB	Akram Komilov	42	3	28+1	2	7	0	6	1
6	DF	(Uzbekistan) UZB	Anvar Gafurov	17	1	13	1	4	0	0	0
8	MF	(Uzbekistan) UZB	Jovlon Ibrokhimov	37	0	25+1	0	7	0	4	0
9	FW	(Uzbekistan) UZB	Shahzodbek Nurmatov	40	5	21+7	3	5+2	1	3+2	1
11	FW	(Moldova) MDA	Vadim Cemîrtan	20	4	4+7	2	2+3	1	3+1	1
14	MF	(Uzbekistan) UZB	Vokhid Shodiev	13	4	4+6	4	0+3	0	0	0
16	MF	(Uzbekistan) UZB	Alisher Sanayev	10	0	3+1	0	0	0	1+5	0
17	MF	(Uzbekistan) UZB	Dostonbek Khamdamov	44	19	30	14	7	4	6+1	1
18	MF	(Uzbekistan) UZB	Sardor Sabirkhodjaev	3	0	1+2	0	0	0	0	0
19	MF	(Uzbekistan) UZB	Nurillo Tukhtasinov	26	1	12+5	0	1+1	1	6+1	0
21	MF	(Uzbekistan) UZB	Dilshodbek Axmadaliev	40	3	27+1	3	7	0	5	0
22	MF	(Uzbekistan) UZB	Shohrux Gadoyev	18	4	13+2	4	2+1	0	0	0
25	GK	(Uzbekistan) UZB	Murod Zukhurov	36	0	22	0	7	0	7	0
28	DF	(Uzbekistan) UZB	Davronbek Umirov	24	0	10+8	0	2+2	0	2	0
29	MF	(Uzbekistan) UZB	Otabek Shukurov	42	7	27+1	5	7	2	6+1	0
30	MF	(Uzbekistan) UZB	Khursid Giyosov	14	0	6+4	0	0	0	3+1	0
32	GK	(Uzbekistan) UZB	Suhrobjon Sultonov	8	0	8	0	0	0	0	0
44	MF	(Uzbekistan) UZB	Mirjamol Kosimov	28	4	18	2	7	2	2+1	0
50	MF	(Uzbekistan) UZB	Farrukh Ikramov	19	2	0+13	1	0+6	1	0	0
54	FW	(Uzbekistan) UZB	Mirjakhon Mirakhmadov	3	0	0+3	0	0	0	0	0
59	MF	(Uzbekistan) UZB	Sukhrob Izzatov	1	0	0+1	0	0	0	0	0
77	FW	(Uzbekistan) UZB	Shokhruz Norkhonov	11	1	3+5	1	2+1	0	0	0
Players away on loan:
20	MF	(Uzbekistan) UZB	Sardorbek Azimov	12	0	3+4	0	0+1	0	2+2	0
Players who left Bunyodkor during the season:
5	DF	(Uzbekistan) UZB	Javlon Mirabdullaev	5	0	2	0	0	0	3	0
7	MF	(Serbia) SRB	Dušan Mićić	10	0	5	0	0	0	5	0
10	FW	(Uzbekistan) UZB	Eldor Shomurodov	23	2	11+3	1	3	0	6	1
97	FW	(Uzbekistan) UZB	Javoxir Esonkulov	15	0	1+9	0	0	0	0+5	0

=== Goal scorers ===
Place	Position	Nation	Number	Name	Uzbek League	Uzbekistan Cup	Champions League	Total
1	MF	(Uzbekistan)	17	Dostonbek Khamdamov	14	4	1	19
2	DF	(Uzbekistan)	29	Otabek Shukurov	5	2	0	7
3	FW	(Uzbekistan)	9	Shahzodbek Nurmatov	3	1	1	5
4	MF	(Uzbekistan)	14	Vokhid Shodiev	4	0	0	4
4	MF	(Uzbekistan)	22	Shohrux Gadoyev	4	0	0	4
4	MF	(Uzbekistan)	44	Mirjamol Kosimov	2	2	0	4
4	FW	(Moldova)	11	Vadim Cemîrtan	2	1	1	4
8	DF	(Uzbekistan)	2	Rustam Ashurmatov	3	0	0	3
8	MF	(Uzbekistan)	21	Dilshodbek Axmadaliev	3	0	0	3
8	DF	(Uzbekistan)	4	Akram Komilov	2	0	1	3
11	MF	(Uzbekistan)	50	Farrukh Ikramov	1	1	0	2
11	FW	(Uzbekistan)	10	Eldor Shomurodov	1	0	1	2
13	FW	(Uzbekistan)	77	Shokhruz Norkhonov	1	0	0	1
13	DF	(Uzbekistan)	6	Anvar Gafurov	1	0	0	1
13	DF	(Uzbekistan)	3	Islom Kobilov	1	0	0	1
13	MF	(Uzbekistan)	19	Nurillo Tukhtasinov	0	1	0	1
				TOTALS	47	12	5	64

=== Disciplinary record ===
Number	Nation	Position	Name	Uzbek League		Uzbekistan Cup		Champions League		Total	
Number	Nation	Position	Name	Yellow card	Red card	Yellow card	Red card	Yellow card	Red card	Yellow card	Red card
2	(Uzbekistan)	DF	Rustam Ashurmatov	4	0	0	0	2	0	6	0
3	(Uzbekistan)	DF	Islom Kobilov	2	0	1	0	0	0	3	0
4	(Uzbekistan)	DF	Akram Komilov	6	0	0	0	2	1	8	1
6	(Uzbekistan)	DF	Anvar Gafurov	2	0	1	0	0	0	3	0
7	(Serbia)	MF	Dušan Mićić	2	0	0	0	0	0	2	0
8	(Uzbekistan)	MF	Jovlon Ibrokhimov	1	0	0	0	1	0	2	0
9	(Uzbekistan)	FW	Shahzodbek Nurmatov	2	0	0	0	0	0	2	0
10	(Uzbekistan)	FW	Eldor Shomurodov	2	0	0	0	0	0	2	0
11	(Moldova)	FW	Vadim Cemîrtan	0	0	0	0	1	1	1	1
14	(Uzbekistan)	MF	Vokhid Shodiev	1	0	0	0	0	0	1	0
16	(Uzbekistan)	MF	Alisher Sanayev	0	0	0	0	1	0	1	0
17	(Uzbekistan)	MF	Dostonbek Khamdamov	3	0	1	0	0	0	4	0
19	(Uzbekistan)	MF	Nurillo Tukhtasinov	1	0	0	0	1	0	2	0
20	(Uzbekistan)	MF	Sardorbek Azimov	1	0	0	0	0	0	1	0
21	(Uzbekistan)	MF	Dilshodbek Axmadaliev	4	0	1	0	2	0	7	0
22	(Uzbekistan)	MF	Shohrux Gadoyev	2	0	0	0	0	0	2	0
28	(Uzbekistan)	DF	Davronbek Umirov	6	1	0	0	1	0	7	1
29	(Uzbekistan)	DF	Otabek Shukurov	5	0	1	0	1	0	7	0
32	(Uzbekistan)	GK	Suhrobjon Sultonov	2	0	0	0	0	0	2	0
44	(Uzbekistan)	MF	Mirjamol Kosimov	3	0	1	0	2	0	6	0
50	(Uzbekistan)	MF	Farrukh Ikramov	1	0	0	0	0	0	1	0
59	(Uzbekistan)	MF	Sukhrob Izzatov	1	0	0	0	0	0	1	0
77	(Uzbekistan)	FW	Shokhruz Norkhonov	1	0	0	0	0	0	1	0
			TOTALS	52	1	6	0	14	2	72	3
