= Shohrux Gadoyev =

Uzbekistani footballer

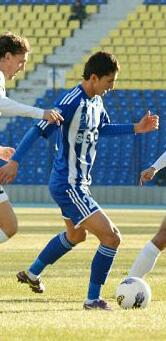

Personal information
- Full name: Shohruh Gadoev
- Date of birth: December 31, 1991 (age 34)
- Place of birth: Qarshi, Uzbekistan
- Height: 1.74 m (5 ft 9 in)
- Position: Left midfielder

Team information
- Current team: Neftchi Fergana

Senior career*
Years	Team	Apps	(Gls)
2012–2015	Nasaf Qarshi	63	(10)
2016	Al-Muharraq		(2)
2016–2017	Bunyodkor	12	(1)
2017	Buxoro	15	(2)
2017	Bunyodkor	15	(4)
2018–2019	Daejeon Citizen	40	(8)
2019	Bunyodkor	10	(1)
2020	Keşla	7	(2)
2021–2024	AGMK	75	(9)
2025–	Neftchi Fergana	0	(0)

International career^{‡}
2012–	Uzbekistan	14	(1)
- * Club domestic league appearances and goals as of 5 January 2024 ‡ National team caps and goals as of 27 March 2018

Shohrux Gadoyev is an Uzbekistani footballer who plays as a midfielder for Neftchi Fergana.

== Career ==
On 26 July 2017, Gadoyev re-signed for FC Bunyodkor. On 11 December 2019, Gadoyev signed an 18-month contract with Keşla FK of the Azerbaijan Premier League.

== Career statistics ==
=== Club ===
As of match played 21 August 2020

Club	Season	League			National Cup		League Cup		Continental		Other		Total	
Club	Season	Division	Apps	Goals	Apps	Goals	Apps	Goals	Apps	Goals	Apps	Goals	Apps	Goals
Nasaf Qarshi	2012	Uzbek League	15	0	6	0	–		4	0	–		25	0
Nasaf Qarshi	2013	Uzbek League	14	3	4	2	–		–		–		18	5
Nasaf Qarshi	2014	Uzbek League	7	0	0	0	–		0	0	–		7	0
Nasaf Qarshi	2015	Uzbek League	27	5	4	1	–		4	0	–		35	6
Nasaf Qarshi	Total		63	10	14	3	-	-	8	0	-	-	85	13
Al-Muharraq	2015–16	Bahraini Premier League					–		4	1	–		4	1
Bunyodkor	2016	Uzbek League	12	1	2	1	–		0	0	–		14	2
Bunyodkor	2017	Uzbek League	0	0	0	0	–		0	0	–		0	0
Bunyodkor	Total		12	1	2	1	-	-	0	0	-	-	14	2
Buxoro	2017	Uzbek League	15	2	3	0	–		–		–		18	2
Bunyodkor	2017	Uzbek League	15	4	3	0	–		0	0	–		18	4
Daejeon Citizen	2018	K League 2	32	8	0	0	–		–		–		32	8
Daejeon Citizen	2019	K League 2	8	0	0	0	–		–		–		8	0
Daejeon Citizen	Total		40	8	0	0	-	-	-	-	-	-	40	8
Bunyodkor	2019	Uzbek League	10	1	3	1	0	0	–		–		13	2
Keşla	2019–20	Azerbaijan Premier League	6	2	0	0	–		–		–		6	2
Keşla	2020–21	Azerbaijan Premier League	1	0	0	0	–		0	0	–		1	0
Keşla	Total		7	2	0	0	-	-	0	0	-	-	7	2
Career total			172	26	25	5	0	0	12	1	-	-	199	32

=== International ===
Uzbekistan national team
Year	Apps	Goals
2012	7	0
2013	6	1
Total	13	1

Statistics accurate as of match played 11 June 2013

=== International goals ===
Scores and results list Uzbekistan's goal tally first.

No	Date	Venue	Opponent	Score	Result	Competition
1.	22 March 2013	Zayed Sports City Stadium, Abu Dhabi, United Arab Emirates	United Arab Emirates	1–0	1–2	2015 AFC Asian Cup qualification
