= Sadio Tounkara =

Malian footballer

Personal information
- Date of birth: 27 April 1992 (age 34)
- Place of birth: Bamako, Mali
- Height: 1.76 m (5 ft 9 1/2 in)
- Position: Midfielder

Youth career
- Jeanne d'Arc

Senior career*
Years	Team	Apps	(Gls)
2007–2011	Jeanne d'Arc		
2012–2015	Khazar Lankaran	106	(15)
2016	Enosis Neon Paralimni	5	(0)
2016–2017	AZAL	13	(0)
2017–2019	Zira	38	(5)
2020	Narva Trans	21	(2)
2021–2022	Shamakhi	32	(2)
- * Club domestic league appearances and goals as of 15:06, 8 December 2022 (UTC)

Sadio Tounkara (born 27 April 1992) is a Malian professional footballer who plays as a midfielder.

== Playing career ==
=== Club ===
Tounkara played for a Mali academy from the age of 12 to 15, before signing for then signed for Malian Second Division side Jeanne d'Arc, earning promotion to the Malian Première Division for the 2008/09 season. During the winter of the 2011–12 season, Tounkara signed for Azerbaijan Premier League side Khazar Lankaran. After leaving Enosis Neon Paralimni, Tounkara spent six-months without a club before being linked with a return to the Azerbaijan Premier League with AZAL, signing a six-month contract, with an optional year, with AZAL on 1 December 2016.

On 4 September 2017, Zira FK announced the signing of Tounkara on a two-year contract.

On 27 February 2020, Tounkara signed a one-year contract with Estonian club Narva Trans.

On 13 January 2021, Tounkara signed for Keşla until the end of the 2020–21 season.

== Career statistics ==
As of match played 24 May 2021

Appearances and goals by club, season and competition
Club	Season	League			National Cup		Continental		Other		Total	
Club	Season	Division	Apps	Goals	Apps	Goals	Apps	Goals	Apps	Goals	Apps	Goals
Khazar Lankaran	2011–12	Azerbaijan Premier League	11	1	1	0	-		-		12	1
Khazar Lankaran	2012–13	Azerbaijan Premier League	28	5	4	0	4	0	-		36	5
Khazar Lankaran	2013–14	Azerbaijan Premier League	35	5	5	2	3	0	1	0	44	7
Khazar Lankaran	2014–15	Azerbaijan Premier League	23	3	2	0	-		-		25	3
Khazar Lankaran	2015–16	Azerbaijan Premier League	9	1	0	0	-		-		9	1
Khazar Lankaran	Total		106	15	12	2	7	0	1	0	126	17
Enosis Neon Paralimni	2015–16	Cypriot First Division	5	0	0	0	–		–		5	0
AZAL	2016–17	Azerbaijan Premier League	13	0	1	0	–		–		14	0
Zira	2017–18	Azerbaijan Premier League	16	3	3	0	-		-		19	3
Zira	2018–19	Azerbaijan Premier League	22	2	3	0	-		-		25	2
Zira	Total		38	5	6	0	-	-	-	-	44	5
Narva Trans	2020	Meistriliiga	21	2	3	1	-		-		24	3
Keşla	2020–21	Azerbaijan Premier League	12	1	5	1	0	0	-		17	2
Keşla	2021–22	Azerbaijan Premier League	1	0	0	0	-		-		1	0
Keşla	Total		13	1	5	1	-	-	-	-	18	2
Career total			196	23	26	4	7	0	1	0	231	27

== Honours ==
=== Club ===
Khazar Lankaran

- Azerbaijan Supercup: 2013
