= Nathan Oduwa =

Nigerian footballer (born 1996)

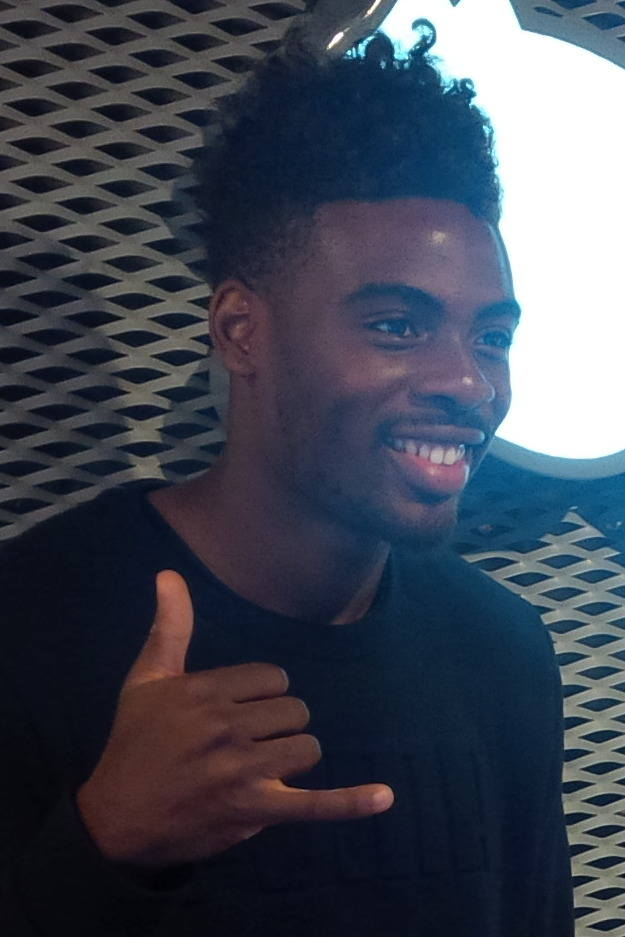
- Oduwa in 2015

Personal information
- Full name: Kelade Nathan Oduwa
- Date of birth: 5 March 1996 (age 30)
- Place of birth: Bloomsbury, England
- Height: 6 ft 2 in (1.89 m)
- Position: Winger

Youth career
- 2007–2013: Tottenham Hotspur

Senior career*
Years	Team	Apps	(Gls)
2013–2017	Tottenham Hotspur	0	(0)
2015	→ Luton Town (loan)	11	(0)
2015–2016	→ Rangers (loan)	15	(1)
2016	→ Colchester United (loan)	2	(0)
2016–2017	→ Peterborough United (loan)	6	(0)
2017–2018	Olimpija Ljubljana	22	(2)
2018	Vejle Boldklub	3	(0)
2019	Hapoel Hadera	13	(1)
2020	Dundalk	10	(0)
2022	Shamakhi	11	(0)
2022–2023	Turan Tovuz	28	(5)
2024	Chungbuk Cheongju	10	(2)

International career
2012	England U17	7	(0)
2014	England U18	2	(0)
2015	England U20	3	(0)
2016	Nigeria U23	4	(0)
- * Club domestic league appearances and goals as of 10:09, 24 July 2024 (UTC)

Kelede Nathan Oduwa (born 5 March 1996) is a professional footballer who plays as a winger. He has represented England at the under-17, under-18, and under-20 levels, and Nigeria at the under-23 level.

== Club career ==
=== Tottenham Hotspur ===
Born in Bloomsbury, Greater London, Oduwa joined Tottenham Hotspur at the age of 11 and progressed through the club's youth system, signing his first professional contract in July 2012. He played for the club's under-18 team, making 24 appearances and scoring 10 goals during the 2013–14 season. Oduwa was promoted to the under-21 team for the subsequent season, scoring four goals.

On 2 February 2015, Oduwa joined League Two club Luton Town on loan until the end of the 2014–15 season. He made his Football League debut on 7 February as a 59th-minute substitute for Shaun Whalley in a 1–1 draw with Oxford United at the Kassam Stadium. He completed the loan spell with 11 appearances for Luton, eight of which came as a substitute.

On 13 August 2015, Oduwa, alongside Spurs teammate, Dominic Ball, signed for Scottish Championship club Rangers on season-long loans. He debuted three days later as a 61st-minute substitute for Barrie McKay in a 5–1 away win over Alloa Athletic. During the match, he sparked controversy by performing a rainbow flick, which an Alloa defender called "disrespectful". Oduwa scored his first goal for the Ibrox club in a 4–0 home win over Dumbarton on 1 December. By late October, he had managed four assists, as well as winning several penalties. However, as Rangers sought more permanent options in Oduwa's position, his loan spell was cut short, and he returned to Tottenham Hotspur on 17 January 2016.

On 26 February 2016, Oduwa signed for League One club Colchester United on a one-month loan. He made only two appearances for the club, both of which were as a substitute.

On 31 August 2016, Oduwa joined League One club Peterborough United on loan until 2 January 2017. He made his debut for the club in a 2–2 draw at home to Swindon Town on 3 September. Peterborough manager Grant McCann confirmed that Oduwa returned to Tottenham on 1 January, having made nine substitute appearances.

=== Olimpija Ljubljana ===
On 14 February 2017, Oduwa signed for Slovenian PrvaLiga club Olimpija Ljubljana on a three-year contract. He debuted on 25 February in a 1–0 defeat away to Maribor. Oduwa left the club on 22 July 2018, after his contract was terminated by mutual consent.

=== Vejle Boldklub ===
On 28 September 2018, Vejle Boldklub announced the signing of Oduwa on a three-year contract. On 17 December 2018, Vejle and Oduwa agreed to terminate the players contract before time.

=== Hapoel Hadera ===
On 30 January 2019, Oduwa signed for the Israeli Premier League club Hapoel Hadera.

=== Dundalk ===
On 10 March 2020, Oduwa signed for League of Ireland Premier Division champions Dundalk.

=== Shamakhi ===
On 3 February 2022, Azerbaijan Premier League club Keşla announced the signing of Oduwa on a contract until the end of the 2021–22 season. On 6 April 2022, Keşla FK changed their name to Shamakhi FK.

=== Turan Tovuz ===
On 30 June 2023, Turan Tovuz announced the departure of Oduwa after his contract had expired.

=== Chungbuk Cheongju ===
On 15 January 2024, K League 2 club Chungbuk Cheongju announced the signing of Oduwa. In July 2024, Oduwa left the club after 11 appearances in all competitions.

== International career ==
Oduwa has represented England at multiple youth levels. In September 2015, he was named in the England U20 squad.

On 24 March 2016, Oduwa debuted for Nigeria U23 in a friendly match against Brazil U23, where he replaced Imoh Ezekiel in the final minutes of the match. Oduwa was part of Nigeria U23 team at the Suwon Invitational Tournament in preparation for the Rio 2016 Olympics.

== Style of play ==
Oduwa mainly plays as a left winger, although he is also capable of playing on the right wing. He has a very direct play style, and uses pace, dribbling, and tricks (such as the rainbow flick) to beat opposing defenders. He provides assists with his balls in from wide positions, and also draws a lot of fouls.

== Career statistics ==
As of match played 24 July 2024

Appearances and goals by club, season and competition
Club	Season	League			National Cup		League Cup		Continental		Other		Total	
Club	Season	Division	Apps	Goals	Apps	Goals	Apps	Goals	Apps	Goals	Apps	Goals	Apps	Goals
Tottenham Hotspur	2014–15	Premier League	0	0	0	0	0	0	0	0	—		0	0
Tottenham Hotspur	2015–16	Premier League	0	0	0	0	0	0	0	0	—		0	0
Tottenham Hotspur	2016–17	Premier League	0	0	0	0	0	0	0	0	—		0	0
Tottenham Hotspur	Total		0	0	0	0	0	0	0	0	—		0	0
Luton Town (loan)	2014–15	League Two	11	0	—		—		—		—		11	0
Rangers (loan)	2015–16	Scottish Championship	15	1	—		2	0	—		2 (Note: Appearances in Scottish Challenge Cup)	0	19	1
Colchester United (loan)	2015–16	EFL League One	2	0	—		—		—		—		2	0
Peterborough United (loan)	2016–17	EFL League One	6	0	1	0	—		—		2 (Note: Appearances in EFL Trophy)	0	9	0
Olimpija Ljubljana	2016–17	Slovenian PrvaLiga	4	0	1	0	—		—		—		5	0
Olimpija Ljubljana	2017–18	Slovenian PrvaLiga	18	2	0	0	—		2 (Note: Appearances in UEFA Europa League)	0	—		20	2
Olimpija Ljubljana	Total		22	2	1	0	0	0	2	0	—		25	2
Vejle Boldklub	2018–19	Danish Superliga	3	0	0	0	—		—		—		3	0
Hapoel Hadera	2018–19	Israeli Premier League	13	1	3	0	—		—		—		16	1
Dundalk	2020	League of Ireland Premier Division	10	0	2	2	—		4 (Note: 1 appearance in UEFA Champions League, 3 appearances in UEFA Europa League)	0	—		16	2
Shamakhi	2021–22	Azerbaijan Premier League	11	0	0	0	—		0 (Note: Appearances in the UEFA Europa Conference League)	0	—		11	0
Turan Tovuz	2022–23	Azerbaijan Premier League	28	5	4	1	—		—		—		32	6
Chungbuk Cheongju	2024	K League 2	10	2	1	0	—		—		—		11	2
Career total			131	11	12	3	2	0	6	0	4	0	155	14

== Honours ==
Olimpija Ljubljana

- Slovenian PrvaLiga: 2017–18
- Slovenian Cup: 2017–18; runner-up: 2016–17

Dundalk

- FAI Cup: 2020
