= Franco Flores (footballer, born 1993) =

Argentine footballer

Personal information
- Full name: Franco Valentín Flores
- Date of birth: May 28, 1993 (age 33)
- Place of birth: Pergamino, Argentina
- Height: 1.85 m (6 ft 1 in)
- Position: Centre back

Team information
- Current team: Real España

Senior career*
Years	Team	Apps	(Gls)
2012–2016	Argentinos Juniors	28	(0)
2014	→ Douglas Haig (loan)	13	(0)
2016	→ Brown de Adrogué (loan)	5	(0)
2016	Lleida Esportiu	11	(1)
2017	Chiapas	0	(0)
2017–2018	Douglas Haig	11	(2)
2018–2019	Alki Oroklini	28	(2)
2019–2020	Keşla	18	(1)
2020–2021	Doxa Drama		
2021	Real España	26	(0)
2022–	Keşla	0	(0)
- * Club domestic league appearances and goals as of 14 January 2022

Franco Valentín Flores (born 28 May 1993), commonly nicknamed El Turu, is an Argentine professional footballer who plays as a central defender for Azerbaijan Premier League club Keşla.

== Career ==
=== Club ===
On 17 June 2019, Keşla announced the signing of Flores on a one-year contract.

On 13 January 2022, Flores returned to Keşla, signing a contract until the end of the 2021–22 season.
