= Yalany Baio =

Bissau-Guinean footballer

Personal information
- Full name: Yalany Cuino Baio
- Date of birth: 10 October 1994 (age 32)
- Place of birth: Bissau, Guinea-Bissau
- Position: Midfielder

Youth career
- Benfica
- 2011–2014: Liverpool

Senior career*
Years	Team	Apps	(Gls)
2015	Sparta Rotterdam	9	(1)
2017	Bangor City	7	(0)
2017–2018	Gibraltar United	20	(1)
2018–2019	Bangor City	8	(0)
2019	Llandudno	10	(2)
2019	Bangor City	12	(2)
2021–2022	Cefn Druids	12	(0)
2023	Llandudno	5	(1)

International career^{‡}
2011	Portugal U18	2	(0)
2015	Guinea (unofficial)	1	(0)
- * Club domestic league appearances and goals as of 13 September 2023 ‡ National team caps and goals as of 2 June 2015 (UTC)

Yalany Cuino Baio (born 10 October 1994) is a Bissau-Guinean footballer who plays as a midfielder.

== Club career ==
After playing for the youth team of S.L. Benfica, he joined Liverpool in 2011 and played for the team's youth and reserve teams. In February 2014, with his contract due to expire in the summer, he was tracked by clubs in France and the Netherlands.

On 15 January 2015, after having been without a club since his release by Liverpool, he signed for Dutch Eerste Divisie club Sparta Rotterdam for the rest of the season with the option of two further campaigns. He made his professional debut the next day in a 1–1 home draw against Den Bosch. He played nine games – all starts – for Sparta and scored in a 6–0 win over Jong Ajax on 25 January.

In January 2017, Baio went back to Great Britain when he signed a short-term deal at Bangor City in the Welsh Premier League. He was sent off on 25 February in a 2–1 loss at The New Saints in the quarter-finals of the Welsh Cup. He then moved to Gibraltar that September to sign for Gibraltar United, as part of an ambitious project headed by new owner Michel Salgado.

Baio returned to Bangor, now relegated to the Cymru Alliance, in June 2018. The following 31 January, he was one of four players released to cut costs, and signed for Llandudno of the top flight hours later. He played ten matches in his first half-season with the club, and scored twice in a 4–0 win at Llanelli Town on 20 April, with both teams already relegated.

On 18 July 2019, Baio signed for the third time to Bangor. He and Aldair Neto were released in December.

Baio returned to action in August 2021, signing for Cymru Premier side Cefn Druids.

On 14 July 2023, Baio signed for his former club Llandudno.

== International career ==
Baio was born in Bissau, Guinea-Bissau to a Guinean father and a Bissau-Guinean mother. He holds citizenship of Portugal, and played twice for their under-18 team in 2011.

On 6 June 2015, he played in an international friendly for Guinea, replacing Lass Bangoura after 54 minutes of a 2–2 draw with Chad in Saint-Leu-la-Forêt, France. This was not a FIFA sanctioned game, as FIFA records still classify him as declared for Guinea-Bissau.
