= Dušan Mićić =

Serbian footballer (born 1984)

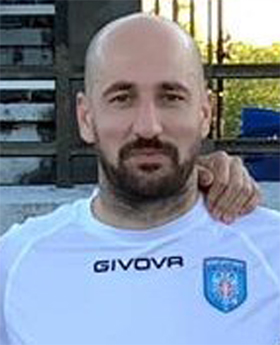
- Mićić in 2019

Personal information
- Date of birth: 29 November 1984 (age 41)
- Place of birth: Novi Sad, SFR Yugoslavia
- Height: 1.90 m (6 ft 3 in)
- Position: Midfielder

Senior career*
Years	Team	Apps	(Gls)
2003	Mladenovac	1	(0)
2003–2004	Inđija	15	(1)
2004–2005	Rudar Ugljevik	20	(0)
2006	Borac Novi Sad		
2006–2007	Sloga Temerin	10	(1)
2007	→ Jedinstvo Stara Pazova (loan)	15	(0)
2007	Mladost Bački Petrovac		
2008	Slavija Novi Sad	10	(1)
2008–2009	ČSK Čelarevo	1	(0)
2009	→ Metalac Futog (loan)	7	(0)
2009	Proleter Novi Sad	9	(1)
2010–2011	Rudar Pljevlja	38	(3)
2011–2012	Grbalj	26	(4)
2013	Proleter Novi Sad	13	(3)
2013	Voždovac	13	(0)
2014	Napredak Kruševac	16	(3)
2015	Lierse	1	(0)
2015–2016	Borac Čačak	19	(2)
2016–2017	Vojvodina	9	(0)
2017	Bunyodkor	5	(0)
2017	Radnik Surdulica	16	(4)
2018	Radnički Niš	18	(2)
2018–2019	Proleter Novi Sad	11	(0)
2019–2021	Serbian White Eagles		
- * Club domestic league appearances and goals

Dušan Mićić (Serbian Cyrillic: Душан Мићић; born 29 November 1984) is a Serbian former professional footballer who played as a midfielder.

== Club career ==
Born in Novi Sad, he is one of the players who appeared relatively late in the highest ranks of Serbian football, at the age of 29. He started in the Second League of Serbia and Montenegro with OFK Mladenovac in 2003. The following season, he played with FK Inđija, and later played abroad in the Premier League of Bosnia and Herzegovina with Rudar Ugljevik. He later played with various Serbian clubs in lower-tier leagues. In 2009, he played in the Serbian First League with Proleter Novi Sad.

In 2010, he played in the Montenegrin First League with Rudar Pljevlja. In his debut season with Rudar, he assisted in securing the league title. As a result, he featured in the 2010–11 UEFA Champions League against Tre Fiori and Litex Lovech. The following season, he transferred to FK Grbalj. He returned to Proleter Novi Sad in 2013 and ultimately joined Voždovac in the summer of 2013, when this club competed in the Serbian SuperLiga.

He played with Napredak Kruševac until the end of the 2013–14 season. As of January 2015, he joined the Belgian side Lierse, but due to the appointment of a new coach, he was released from his contract after a couple of weeks on 2 February. Returning to Serbia, Mićić signed for Borac Čačak. After a great first half of the season 2015–16, in which Mićić played an instrumental role in defensive midfield, helping Borac to climb to 3rd place and to reach the quarter-final of the cup, Dušan signed a 2 1/2-year deal with Vojvodina. Throughout his time with Vojvodina, he participated in the 2016–17 UEFA Europa League against FK Bokelj, Connah's Quay Nomads, Dinamo Minsk, and AZ Alkmaar.

On 5 January 2017, Mićić and Vojvodina mutually terminated the contract. He immediately inked a deal abroad in the Uzbekistan Super League with FC Bunyodkor. During his tenure with Bunyodkor, he featured in the 2017 AFC Champions League. After a twelve-month term with Bunyodkor, he returned to the Serbian SuperLiga to play with Radnik Surdulica. He later had stints with FK Radnički Niš and returned to Proleter Novi Sad. During his time with Radnički, he played in the 2018–19 UEFA Europa League against Gżira United and Maccabi Tel Aviv.

In 2019, he played in the Canadian Soccer League with the Serbian White Eagles FC. He re-signed with Serbian White Eagles for the 2021 season.

== Honours ==
Rudar Pljevlja

- Montenegrin First League: 2009–10
- Montenegrin Cup: 2010, 2011
