= Vadim Cemîrtan =

Moldovan footballer

Personal information
- Full name: Vadim Cemîrtan
- Date of birth: 21 July 1987 (age 39)
- Place of birth: Bender, Moldavian SSR
- Height: 1.80 m (5 ft 11 in)
- Position: Striker

Team information
- Current team: Florești
- Number: 10

Senior career*
| Years | Team | Apps | (Gls) |
| 2008–2010 | Tighina | 38 | (2) |
| 2010–2011 | Academia Chișinău | 5 | (0) |
| 2011–2012 | Iskra-Stal | 7 | (0) |
| 2011–2012 | Academia Chișinău | 9 | (1) |
| 2012–2013 | Nistru Otaci | 18 | (5) |
| 2013–2015 | Costuleni | 33 | (12) |
| 2015–2016 | Dinamo-Auto | 20 | (10) |
| 2016 | Dacia Chișinău | 7 | (3) |
| 2016 | Than Quang Ninh | | |
| 2016 | Buxoro | 11 | (8) |
| 2017 | Bunyodkor | 11 | (2) |
| 2018 | AGMK | 12 | (1) |
| 2018 | Buxoro | 11 | (0) |
| 2019 | Sfântul Gheorghe | 16 | (6) |
| 2020 | Ma'an SC | | |
| 2020 | Zimbru Chișinău | 10 | (3) |
| 2021–2022 | Dinamo-Auto | 30 | (3) |
| 2022–2023 | Florești | 9 | (3) |
| Total | | 248 | (59) |

International career
| 2016–2019 | Moldova | 4 | (0) |
- * Club domestic league appearances and goals

Vadim Cemîrtan (born 21 July 1987) is a Moldovan footballer who plays as a striker for Florești in the Moldovan Super Liga.

== Career statistics ==
=== Club ===
Appearances and goals by club, season and competition
| Club | Season | League | | | National cup | | Continental | | Other | | Total | |
| Club | Season | Division | Apps | Goals | Apps | Goals | Apps | Goals | Apps | Goals | Apps | Goals |
|---|---|---|---|---|---|---|---|---|---|---|---|---|
| Academia Chișinău | 2010–11 | Divizia Națională | 5 | 0 | 0 | 0 | — | | — | | 5 | 0 |
| Iskra-Stal | 2011–12 | Divizia Națională | 7 | 0 | 0 | 0 | — | | — | | 18 | 5 |
| Academia Chișinău | 2011–12 | Divizia Națională | 9 | 1 | 0 | 0 | — | | — | | 18 | 5 |
| Nistru Otaci | 2012–13 | Divizia Națională | 18 | 5 | 0 | 0 | — | | — | | 18 | 5 |
| Costuleni | 2012–13 | Divizia Națională | 12 | 7 | 0 | 0 | — | | — | | 12 | 7 |
| Costuleni | 2013–14 | Divizia Națională | 21 | 5 | 0 | 0 | — | | — | | 21 | 5 |
| Costuleni | 2014–15 | Divizia Națională | — | | — | | 1 | 0 | — | | 1 | 0 |
| Costuleni | Total | | 33 | 12 | 0 | 0 | 1 | 0 | — | | 34 | 12 |
| Dinamo-Auto | 2014–15 | Divizia Națională | 8 | 6 | — | | — | | — | | 8 | 6 |
| Dinamo-Auto | 2015–16 | Divizia Națională | 12 | 4 | 1 | 2 | — | | — | | 13 | 6 |
| Dinamo-Auto | Total | | 20 | 10 | 1 | 2 | — | | — | | 21 | 12 |
| Dacia Chișinău | 2015–16 | Divizia Națională | 7 | 3 | 2 | 0 | — | | — | | 9 | 3 |
| Buxoro | 2016 | Uzbek League | 11 | 8 | — | | — | | — | | 11 | 8 |
| Bunyodkor | 2017 | Uzbek League | 11 | 2 | 5 | 1 | 4 | 1 | — | | 20 | 4 |
| AGMK | 2018 | Uzbekistan Super League | 12 | 1 | 0 | 0 | — | | — | | 12 | 1 |
| Buxoro | 2018 | Uzbekistan Super League | 11 | 0 | — | | — | | — | | 11 | 0 |
| Sfîntul Gheorghe | 2019 | Divizia Națională | 16 | 6 | 0 | 0 | — | | — | | 16 | 6 |
| Ma'an SC | 2020 | Jordanian Pro League | 0 | 0 | 0 | 0 | — | | — | | 0 | 0 |
| Zimbru Chișinău | 2020–21 | Divizia Națională | 10 | 3 | 0 | 0 | — | | — | | 10 | 3 |
| Dinamo-Auto | 2020–21 | Divizia Națională | 11 | 1 | 2 | 0 | — | | — | | 13 | 1 |
| Dinamo-Auto | 2021–22 | Divizia Națională | 19 | 2 | 3 | 1 | — | | — | | 22 | 3 |
| Dinamo-Auto | Total | | 30 | 3 | 5 | 1 | — | | — | | 35 | 4 |
| Florești | 2022–23 | Moldovan Super Liga | 9 | 3 | 1 | 0 | — | | — | | 10 | 3 |
| Florești | 2023–24 | Moldovan Super Liga | 1 | 0 | — | | — | | — | | 1 | 0 |
| Florești | Total | | 10 | 3 | 1 | 0 | — | | — | | 11 | 3 |
| Career total | | | 210 | 57 | 14 | 4 | 5 | 0 | 0 | 0 | 229 | 61 |

=== International ===
Appearances and goals by national team and year
| National team | Year | Apps | Goals |
|---|---|---|---|
| Moldova | 2016 | 2 | 0 |
| Moldova | 2017 | 0 | 0 |
| Moldova | 2018 | 0 | 0 |
| Moldova | 2019 | 2 | 0 |
| Total | | 4 | 0 |
