= Sílvio (footballer, born 1994) =

Brazilian footballer

Sílvio Rodrigues
Personal information
- Full name: Sílvio Rodrigues Pereira Júnior
- Date of birth: 4 May 1994 (age 32)
- Place of birth: Ribeirão Preto, Brazil
- Height: 1.85 m (6 ft 1 in)
- Position: Forward

Team information
- Current team: Renofa Yamaguchi
- Number: 94

Youth career
- Corinthians

Senior career*
Years	Team	Apps	(Gls)
2011–2012	Rio Branco		
2013	Rio Claro		
2014–2015	Ituano		
2015	Batatais	5	(0)
2016–2018	Chornomorets Odesa	15	(0)
2018–2019	Vllaznia Shkodër	26	(11)
2019	ViOn Zlaté Moravce	12	(1)
2020	Vllaznia Shkodër	17	(4)
2020–2021	Keşla	27	(4)
2021–2022	Al Dhaid	11	(5)
2021–2022	Masafi	5	(7)
2022	Persebaya	16	(5)
2023	Persikabo 1973	12	(3)
2023–	Renofa Yamaguchi	19	(2)
- * Club domestic league appearances and goals as of 29 June 2024

Sílvio Rodrigues Pereira Júnior (born 4 May 1994), commonly known as Silvio, is a Brazilian professional footballer who plays as a forward for J League 2 club Renofa Yamaguchi.

== Club career ==
In February 2016, Sílvio signed a contract with the Ukrainian Premier League, Chornomorets Odesa.

On 9 August 2020, he signed a contract with Shamakhi until the end of the 2020–21 season.

On 10 June 2022, he signed a contract with Persebaya Surabaya for 2022-23 Liga 1 season
