= Aldair Neto =

Angolan footballer

Personal information
- Full name: Aldair Sapalo Amaro Neto
- Date of birth: 22 July 1994 (age 32)
- Place of birth: Luanda, Angola
- Height: 1.78 m (5 ft 10 in)
- Position: Forward

Youth career
- 2005–2006: Rio de Mouro
- 2006–2007: Sporting
- 2008–2012: Real
- 2012: União de Coimbra
- 2013: Braga

Senior career*
Years	Team	Apps	(Gls)
2013	Oeiras	10	(0)
2014	Fátima	14	(0)
2014–2018	Marítimo B	64	(4)
2018	Gafanha	3	(1)
2019	Bangor City		
2020	Shkëndija	2	(0)
2020–2021	Pelister	30	(2)
2021–2022	Shamakhi	21	(2)
2023	Torpedo Kutaisi	27	(0)
- * Club domestic league appearances and goals as of 2 December 2023

Aldair Sapalo Amaro Neto (born 22 July 1994) simply Aldair or Aldair Neto, is an Angolan footballer who plays as a forward.

== Career ==
Born in Luanda, Neto spent his youth career in Portugal, with G.D. Rio de Mouro, Sporting CP, Real SC, C.F. União de Coimbra and S.C. Braga. He made his senior debut in 2013 with A.D. Oeiras of the Lisbon Football Association's first district league, and in the new year joined C.D. Fátima in the third tier.

On 8 August 2014, Neto signed a five-year contract with C.S. Marítimo B in Segunda Liga. He made his professional debut the next day in a 2–1 loss at C.D. Aves, as a 61st-minute substitute for Gonçalo Reyes. He became a regular in the third tier following the Madeirans' relegation, and in August 2018 he transferred across the league to G.D. Gafanha. He scored on his debut, a 1–1 home draw with U.S.C. Paredes on 12 August.

In August 2019, after a successful trial following his release from Marítimo, Neto joined Bangor City in the Cymru North, the second tier of Welsh football. He and Yalany Baio were released in December.
