= Nijat Gurbanov =

Azerbaijani footballer (born 1992)

Personal information
- Full name: Nijat Samit oglu Gurbanov
- Date of birth: 17 February 1992 (age 34)
- Place of birth: Baku, Azerbaijan
- Height: 1.77 m (5 ft 10 in)
- Position: Right winger

Team information
- Current team: Samtredia
- Number: 17

Youth career
- 2006–2011: Neftçi Baku

Senior career*
Years	Team	Apps	(Gls)
2011–2014	Simurq	50	(4)
2014–2015	Neftçi Baku	3	(0)
2015	→ Shuvalan (loan)	15	(2)
2015–2016	Zira	25	(3)
2016–2017	Kapaz	22	(0)
2017	Zira	5	(1)
2018–2019	Sumgayit	22	(2)
2019–	Samtredia	24	(10)
- * Club domestic league appearances and goals as of 17 September 2020 ‡ National team caps and goals as of 17 September 2020

Nijat Gurbanov (Azerbaijani: Nicat Qurbanov; born 17 February 1992) is an Azerbaijani footballer who plays as a right winger for Georgian club Samtredia.

== Club career ==
On 16 February 2012, Gurbanov made his debut in the Azerbaijan Premier League for Simurq match against Gabala.
