= Parviz Azadov =

Azerbaijani footballer (born 2000)

Personal information
- Full name: Parviz Azadov
- Date of birth: 19 October 2000 (age 26)
- Place of birth: Baku, Azerbaijan
- Position: Midfielder

Team information
- Current team: Zira
- Number: 66

Senior career*
Years	Team	Apps	(Gls)
2019–2022	Shamakhi	20	(3)
2023–	Zira	2	(0)
- * Club domestic league appearances and goals as of 25 October 2023

Parviz Azadov (Azerbaijani: Pərviz Azadov; born on 19 October 2000) is an Azerbaijani professional footballer who plays as a midfielder for Zira in the Azerbaijan Premier League.

== Club career ==
On 31 August 2019, Azadov made his debut in the Azerbaijan Premier League for Keşla match against Gabala.
