= 2020 FC Bunyodkor season =

FC Bunyodkor
2020 season
- Chairman: Bedil Alimov
- Manager: Vadim Abramov
- Uzbek League: 4th
- Uzbekistan Cup: Round of 16
- AFC Champions League: Playoff Round vs Al Ain
- Top goalscorer: League: Nurillo Tukhtasinov (11); All: Nurillo Tukhtasinov (11)
Home colours	Away colours

The 2020 season was Bunyodkors 14th season in the Uzbek League in Uzbekistan.

== Season events ==
On 16 March, all football in Uzbekistan was suspended due to the COVID-19 pandemic in Uzbekistan.

On 13 July, Bunyodkor's away game against FK Buxoro, scheduled for the same day, was postponed due to the Bunyodkor squad taking precautionary measures after conducting COVID-19 tests.

On 20 July, the Uzbekistan Super League was suspended for a second time due to COVID-19 pandemic in Uzbekistan, with it being announced on 24 July that the league would resume on 3 August with the scheduled 10th round matches.

== Squad ==
As of match played 7 December 2020

No.	Name	Nationality	Position	Date of birth (age)	Signed from	Signed in	Contract ends	Apps.	Goals
Goalkeepers
1	Abdumavlon Abdujalilov	(Uzbekistan)	GK	22 December 1994 (aged 25)	Neftchi Fergana	2019		39	0
25	Akobir Kayumov	(Uzbekistan)	GK	15 May 1996 (aged 24)	Metallurg Bekabad	2020		0	0
50	Jasurbek Umrzoqov	(Uzbekistan)	GK	16 February 2000 (aged 20)	Youth Team	2018		0	0
71	Sarvar Karimov	(Uzbekistan)	GK	25 December 1996 (aged 23)	Kokand 1912	2020	2020	9	0
Defenders
2	Sukhrob Yarashev	(Uzbekistan)	DF	20 October 1997 (aged 23)	Qizilqum Zarafshon	2020		0	0
3	Islom Kobilov	(Uzbekistan)	DF	1 April 1997 (aged 23)	Metallurg Bekabad	2017		71	4
4	Davron Ergashev	(Tajikistan)	DF	19 March 1988 (aged 32)	Khujand	2020	2020	9	0
6	Anvar Gafurov	(Uzbekistan)	DF	14 May 1982 (aged 38)	Obod	2017	2020		
7	Dilshodbek Axmadaliev	(Uzbekistan)	DF	2 November 1994 (aged 26)	Youth Team	2016		67	7
26	Ulugbek Abdullayev	(Uzbekistan)	DF	22 February 1998 (aged 22)	Youth Team	2019		21	0
37	Mukhammadodil Kakhramonov	(Uzbekistan)	DF	10 March 1996 (aged 24)	Metallurg Bekabad	2019		14	1
43	Ibrokhimkhalil Yuldashev	(Uzbekistan)	DF	14 February 2001 (aged 19)	loan from Pakhtakor Tashkent	2020		22	1
Midfielders
10	Khursid Giyosov	(Uzbekistan)	MF	13 April 1995 (aged 25)	Anyang	2020		92	27
11	Rasul Yuldashev	(Uzbekistan)	MF	26 October 2000 (aged 20)	Youth Team	2020		23	1
13	Lutfulla Turaev	(Uzbekistan)	MF	30 March 1988 (aged 32)	AGMK	2019	2020	134	18
15	Gairat Azizkhodjaev	(Uzbekistan)	MF	26 September 2000 (aged 20)	Youth Team	2020		1	0
17	Sanjar Kodirkulov	(Uzbekistan)	MF	27 May 1997 (aged 23)	Youth Team	2016		74	4
19	Nurillo Tukhtasinov	(Uzbekistan)	MF	19 February 1997 (aged 23)	Sogdiana Jizzakh	2019		80	18
22	Sardor Abduraimov	(Uzbekistan)	DF	6 October 1994 (aged 26)	loan from Mash'al Mubarek	2020	2020	3	0
30	Abdulla Abdullayev	(Uzbekistan)	MF	1 September 1997 (aged 23)	Youth Team	2018		64	2
34	Sukhrob Izzatov	(Uzbekistan)	MF	15 February 1999 (aged 21)	Youth Team	2017		37	2
35	Ibrohim Ibrohimov	(Uzbekistan)	MF	12 January 2001 (aged 19)	Youth Team	2020		3	0
48	Valeriy Akopov	(Uzbekistan)	MF	9 February 2000 (aged 20)	Youth Team	2019		9	0
49	Farrukh Ikramov	(Uzbekistan)	MF	9 July 1998 (aged 22)	Youth Team	2017		52	3
Forwards
14	Mirjakhon Mirakhmadov	(Uzbekistan)	FW	15 July 1997 (aged 23)	Youth Team	2016		62	15
20	Vladislav Nuriev	(Uzbekistan)	FW	20 February 1996 (aged 24)		2019		18	2
24	Bahodir Pardaev	(Uzbekistan)	FW	26 April 1987 (aged 33)	Metallurg Bekabad	2020	2020	59+	15
46	Azadzhon Azimzhonov	(Uzbekistan)	FW	21 June 2002 (aged 18)	Youth Team	2020		1	0
77	Selim Nurmuradov	(Turkmenistan)	FW	22 March 1996 (aged 24)	Altyn Asyr	2020	2020	18	2
90	Shakhboz Erkinov	(Uzbekistan)	FW	16 July 1986 (aged 34)		2020		24	5
Youth Team
	Mardon Abdullaev	(Uzbekistan)	DF	30 October 2000 (aged 20)	Youth Team	2019		0	0
	Sardorbek Khursandov	(Uzbekistan)	DF	29 March 2000 (aged 20)	Youth Team	2019		0	0
	Habib Karimov	(Uzbekistan)	MF		Youth Team	2019		0	0
	Khasan Yuldoshev	(Uzbekistan)	MF	21 October 1999 (aged 21)	Youth Team	2019		1	0
	Jamshid Bakhshulloev	(Uzbekistan)	FW	24 January 2001 (aged 19)	Youth Team	2019		0	0
	Buronbek Mirzasalimov	(Uzbekistan)	FW	25 March 2002 (aged 18)	Youth Team	2019		0	0
Players away on loan
5	Bobur Farhodov	(Uzbekistan)	DF	11 February 1996 (aged 24)	Youth Team	2019		18	1
23	Sanjar Rixsiboev	(Uzbekistan)	MF	16 October 1993 (aged 27)	AGMK	2019		10	1
Players who left during the season
8	Jasurbek Jaloliddinov	(Uzbekistan)	MF	15 May 2002 (aged 18)	Youth Team	2018		33	4
21	Gulom-Haydar Gulyamov	(Uzbekistan)	MF	21 December 1990 (aged 29)	AGMK	2020	2020	3	1
70	Murod Kholmukhamedov	(Uzbekistan)	DF	23 December 1990 (aged 29)	loan from Kokand 1912	2020	2020	2	1
74	Eldor Adkhamov	(Uzbekistan)	GK	2 June 1996 (aged 24)	Youth Team	2017		1	0
92	Khumoyun Murtazaev	(Uzbekistan)	FW	8 November 1992 (aged 28)	loan from Mash'al Mubarek	2020	2020	9	3

=== Out on loan ===
Note: Flags indicate national team as defined under FIFA eligibility rules; some limited exceptions apply. Players may hold more than one non-FIFA nationality.

No. / Pos. / Nation / Player; 5 / DF / UZB / Bobur Farhodov (at Buxoro)	No. / Pos. / Nation / Player; 23 / MF / UZB / Sanjar Rixsiboev (at Khujand)

== Transfers ==
=== Winter ===
In: Note: Flags indicate national team as defined under FIFA eligibility rules; some limited exceptions apply. Players may hold more than one non-FIFA nationality.

No.	Pos.	Nation	Player
2	DF	UZB	Sukhrob Yarashev (from (Uzbekistan) Qizilqum Zarafshon)
4	DF	TJK	Davron Ergashev (from (Tajikistan) Khujand)
5	DF	UZB	Ibrokhimkhalil Yuldashev (on loan from (Uzbekistan) Pakhtakor Tashkent)
21	MF	UZB	Gulom-Haydar Gulyamov (from (Uzbekistan) AGMK)
22	MF	UZB	Sardor Abduraimov (loan from (Uzbekistan) Mash'al Mubarek)
24	FW	UZB	Bahodir Pardaev (from (Uzbekistan) Metallurg Bekabad)
25	GK	UZB	Akobir Kayumov (from (Uzbekistan) Metallurg Bekabad)
70	DF	UZB	Murod Kholmukhamedov (loan from (Uzbekistan) Kokand 1912)
71	GK	UZB	Sarvar Karimov (from (Uzbekistan) Kokand 1912)
77	FW	TKM	Selim Nurmuradov (from (Turkmenistan) Altyn Asyr)
92	FW	UZB	Khumoyun Murtazaev (loan from (Uzbekistan) Mash'al Mubarek)

Out: Note: Flags indicate national team as defined under FIFA eligibility rules; some limited exceptions apply. Players may hold more than one non-FIFA nationality.

No.	Pos.	Nation	Player
2	DF	UZB	Kemran Najafaliev (to (Uzbekistan) Andijon)
5	DF	UZB	Bobur Farhodov (loan to (Uzbekistan) Buxoro)
9	MF	UZB	Sardorbek Azimov (to (Uzbekistan) Kokand 1912, previously on loan at (Uzbekistan) Andijon)
10	MF	UZB	Khursid Giyosov (to (South Korea) Anyang)
11	DF	UZB	Javokhir Kakhramonov (to (Uzbekistan) Sogdiana Jizzakh)
15	DF	UZB	Burhan Usmanov
23	MF	UZB	Sanjar Rixsiboev (loan to (Tajikistan) Khujand)
25	GK	UZB	Murod Zukhurov (Retired)
27	MF	UKR	Yevhen Chumak (to (Uzbekistan) Metallurg Bekabad)
31	MF	UZB	Abdulhay Ismoilov (to (Uzbekistan) Andijon)
32	MF	UZB	Islam Karimov
33	MF	UZB	Diyor Rahimkulov (to (Uzbekistan) Andijon)
35	MF	UZB	Ibrahim Ibrahimov
36	FW	UZB	Jahongir Abdusalomov (to (Uzbekistan) Mash'al Mubarek)
38	DF	UZB	Jasur Holdorov
42	MF	UZB	Muzaffar Olimjonov
44	MF	UZB	Ziyovuddin Ahadov
47	MF	UZB	Oybek Hamidov
70	DF	UZB	Murod Kholmukhamedov (loan return to (Uzbekistan) Kokand 1912)
74	GK	UZB	Eldor Adkhamov (to (Uzbekistan) Andijon)
—	DF	UZB	Sanzhar Tursunov (to (Uzbekistan) AGMK)
—	MF	UZB	Shohrux Gadoyev (to (Azerbaijan) Keşla)
—	FW	RUS	Dmitri Ostrovskiy (to (Russia) Yessentuki)

=== Summer ===
In: Note: Flags indicate national team as defined under FIFA eligibility rules; some limited exceptions apply. Players may hold more than one non-FIFA nationality.

No.	Pos.	Nation	Player
10	MF	UZB	Khursid Giyosov (from (South Korea) Anyang)
90	FW	UZB	Shakhboz Erkinov

Out: Note: Flags indicate national team as defined under FIFA eligibility rules; some limited exceptions apply. Players may hold more than one non-FIFA nationality.

No.	Pos.	Nation	Player
8	MF	UZB	Jasurbek Jaloliddinov (to (Russia) Lokomotiv Moscow)
21	MF	UZB	Gulomhaydar Gulomov (to (Uzbekistan) Lokomotiv Tashkent)
22	MF	UZB	Sardor Abduraimov (loan return to (Uzbekistan) Mash'al Mubarek)
92	FW	UZB	Khumoyun Murtazaev (loan return to (Uzbekistan) Mash'al Mubarek)

== Friendlies ==
16 January 2020	Bunyodkor (Uzbekistan)	2 – 2	(South Korea) Suwon	Abu Dhabi, United Arab Emirates
(UTC+5)	Pardaev; Kholmukhamedov	Report	Goal	Stadium: Abu Dhabi Sports Complex

5 June 2020	Bunyodkor	1 – 2	Oqtepa	Tashkent
(UTC+5)	K.Murtazaev	Report	S.Kadyrov; M.Miryusupov	Stadium: Milliy Stadium

== Competitions ==
=== Uzbek League ===
==== League table ====
Pos	Team	Pld	W	D	L	GF	GA	GD	Pts	Qualification or relegation
2	Nasaf	26	15	8	3	47	19	+28	53	Qualification to the 2021 AFC Cup group stage
3	AGMK	26	14	7	5	39	28	+11	49	Qualification to the 2021 AFC Champions League play-off round
4	Bunyodkor	26	12	7	7	43	36	+7	43	
5	Kokand 1912	26	13	3	10	35	28	+7	42	
6	Sogdiana	26	10	8	8	34	32	+2	38	

Source: Uzbekistan Professional Football League
Rules for classification: 1) points; 2) head-to-head points; 3) head-to-head goal difference; 4) head-to-head away goals scored; 5) goal difference; 6) number of goals scored.

==== Results summary ====
Overall								Home						Away					
Pld	W	D	L	GF	GA	GD	Pts	W	D	L	GF	GA	GD	W	D	L	GF	GA	GD
26	12	7	7	43	36	+7	43	9	2	1	25	11	+14	3	5	6	18	25	−7

Last updated: 3 December 2020.
Source: See Results

==== Results by round ====
Round	1	2	3	4	5	6	7	8	9	10	11	12	13	14	15	16	17	18	19	20	21	22	23	24	25	26
Ground	A	H	A	H	A	H	A	H	A	H	A	A	H	H	A	H	A	A	H	A	H	H	A	H	A	A
Result	W	W	L	W	L	W	D	W	D	W	D	D	D	W	W	L	L	L	W	L	D	W	W	W	L	D
Position	3	3	5	3	6	3	6	3	3	3	3	4	5	5	4	4	4	5	5	5	5	5	4	4	4	4

Source: See Results
A = Away; H = Home; W = Win; D = Draw; L = Loss

==== Results ====
1 March 2020 1	Surkhon Termez	1 – 3	Bunyodkor	Termez
14:30 UZT (UTC+5)	Kasyan (yellow card) 40'; J.Mehmonov (yellow card) 66'; A.Xojiakbarov (yellow card) 86'; Ibragimov 90+3' (pen.)	Report	Gafurov (yellow card) 23'; Kodirkulov (yellow card) 45+1'; D.Axmadaliev (yellow card) 48'; N.Tukhtasinov 60'; K.Murtazaev 80'; F.Ikramov 83' (yellow card) 84'	Stadium: Surkhan Stadium; Attendance: 3,920; Referee: Viktor Serazetdinov

7 March 2020 2	Bunyodkor	1 – 0	Mash'al Mubarek	Tashkent
16:00 UZT (UTC+5)	Jaloliddinov 10'; Turaev (yellow card) 17'; R.Yuldashev (yellow card) 76'	Report	S.Shukurullayev (yellow card) 90+2'	Stadium: Milliy Stadium; Attendance: 1,465; Referee: Akobirzuja Shukurullaev

13 March 2020 3	AGMK	2 – 0	Bunyodkor	Olmaliq
18:15 UZT (UTC+5)	M.Toshmatov 19'; B.Abdurakhimov (yellow card) 35'; Shorakhmedov (yellow card) 57'; K.Erkinov 86'	Report	Kobilov (yellow card) 59'; Jaloliddinov (yellow card) 63'	Stadium: AGMK Stadium; Attendance: 3,200; Referee: Vadim Agishev

13 June 2020 4	Bunyodkor	1 – 0	Kokand 1912	Tashkent
19:00 UZT (UTC+5)	Akbarov 86' (o.g.)	Report	A.Mamatxojaev (yellow card) 37'; S.Norbekov (yellow card) 59'; Josović (yellow card) 85'	Stadium: Milliy Stadium; Attendance: 0 Referee: Jasur Muxtarov
Note: Match originally scheduled for 19 March, but postponed due to the COVID-19 pandemic in Uzbekistan. Match played behind closed doors due to the COVID-19 pandemic in Uzbekistan.

19 June 2020 5	Pakhtakor Tashkent	5 – 0	Bunyodkor	Tashkent
20:00 UZT (UTC+5)	Sabirkhodjaev 1'; Masharipov (yellow card) 13'; Ćeran 40', 42'; Derdiyok 45'; Turaev 63' (o.g.)	Report		Stadium: Pakhtakor Central Stadium; Attendance: 0 Referee: Sherzod Kasymov
Note: Match originally scheduled for 4 April, but postponed due to the COVID-19 pandemic in Uzbekistan. Match played behind closed doors due to the COVID-19 pandemic in Uzbekistan.

25 June 2020 6	Bunyodkor	2 – 0	Lokomotiv Tashkent	Tashkent
20:15 UZT (UTC+5)	S.Nurmuradov 19'; Kodirkulov (yellow card) 39'; Kobilov (yellow card) 45'; G-H.Gulyamov 73'	Report	S.Shaymanov (yellow card) 67'	Stadium: Milliy Stadium; Attendance: 0 Referee: Akobirxuja Shukurullaev
Note: Match originally scheduled for 10 April, but postponed due to the COVID-19 pandemic in Uzbekistan. Match played behind closed doors due to the COVID-19 pandemic in Uzbekistan.

1 July 2020 7	Andijon	0 – 0	Bunyodkor	Andijan
19:00 UZT (UTC+5)	J.Khasanov (yellow card) 39'; F.Bekmuratov (yellow card) 79'; Ariwachukwu (yellow card) 90'	Report	N.Tukhtasinov (yellow card) 38' (yellow-red card) 58'; I.Yuldashev (yellow card) 85'; Turaev (yellow card) 85'	Stadium: Soghlom Avlod Stadium; Attendance: 0 Referee: Shavkat Nasibullayev
Note: Match originally scheduled for 17 April, but postponed due to the COVID-19 pandemic in Uzbekistan. Match played behind closed doors due to the COVID-19 pandemic in Uzbekistan.

7 July 2020 8	Bunyodkor	3 – 1	Navbahor Namangan	Tashkent
20:00 UZT (UTC+5)	D.Axmadaliev 25' (yellow card) 59'; Erkinov 28'; Jaloliddinov (yellow card) 38'; S.Nurmuradov 88'	Report	Solovyov (yellow card) 7'; Urinboev (yellow card) 10'; Golban 57'; Ibrokhimov (yellow card) 65'; Yusupov (yellow card) 81'; S.Mahmudxojiyev (yellow card) 82'	Stadium: Milliy Stadium; Attendance: 0 Referee: Asker Nadjafaliev
Note: Match originally scheduled for 25 April, but postponed due to the COVID-19 pandemic in Uzbekistan. Match played behind closed doors due to the COVID-19 pandemic in Uzbekistan.

14 August 2020 9	Buxoro	1 – 1	Bunyodkor	Tashkent
19:00 UZT (UTC+5)	B.Saidov (yellow card) 5'; S.Karimov (yellow card) 12'; J.Khasanov 78' (pen.)	Report	Erkinov (penalty missed) 18'; Kobilov 22'; Turaev (yellow card) 77'	Stadium: Pakhtakor Central Stadium; Attendance: 0 Referee: Akobirzuja Shukurullaev
Note: Match originally scheduled for 2 May, and then 13 July, but postponed twice due to the COVID-19 pandemic in Uzbekistan. Match played at the Pakhtakor Central Stadium in Tashkent instead of Buxoro's regular Buxoro Arena in Bukhara. Match played behind closed doors due to the COVID-19 pandemic in Uzbekistan.

17 August 2020 10	Bunyodkor	2 – 0	Metallurg Bekabad	Olmaliq
18:30 UZT (UTC+5)	N.Tukhtasinov 53', 59'	Report	O.Abdumazhidov (yellow card) 52'; Z.Abdullaev (yellow card) 90'	Stadium: Metallurg Stadium; Attendance: 0 Referee: Vadim Agishev
Note: Match originally scheduled for 16 May, and then 19 July, but postponed twice due to the COVID-19 pandemic in Uzbekistan. Match played at the Metallurg Stadium in Olmaliq instead of Bunyodkor's regular Milliy Stadium in Tashkent. Match played behind closed doors due to the COVID-19 pandemic in Uzbekistan.

20 August 2020 11	Sogdiana Jizzakh	3 – 3	Bunyodkor	Tashkent
19:00 UZT (UTC+5)	J.Qakhramanov 34'; Norkhonov 39', 77' (pen.); Boltaboev (yellow card) 70'	Report	N.Tukhtasinov 35'; Turaev (yellow card) 42' (goal) 52'; Giyosov 47'; I.Yuldashev (yellow card) 66'; A.Abdullayev (yellow card) 76'	Stadium: Lokomotiv Stadium; Attendance: 0 Referee: Sherzod Kasimov
Note: Match originally scheduled for 22 May, 25 July but postponed twice due to the COVID-19 pandemic in Uzbekistan. Match played at the Lokomotiv Stadium in Tashkent instead of Sogdiana Jizzakh's regular Sogdiana Stadium in Jizzakh. Match played behind closed doors due to the COVID-19 pandemic in Uzbekistan.

24 August 2020 12	Nasaf	2 – 2	Bunyodkor	Tashkent
19:00 UZT (UTC+5)	S.Nasrullaev (yellow card) 2'; H.Norchayev 20'; Abdikholikov 57'; Bozorov (yellow card) 71'	Report	S.Izzatov 67'; Erkinov 85'; N.Tukhtasinov (yellow card) 90'	Stadium: Pakhtakor Central Stadium; Attendance: 0 Referee: Asker Nadjafaliev
Note: Match originally scheduled for 13 June, and then 2 August, but postponed twice due to the COVID-19 pandemic in Uzbekistan. Match played at the Pakhtakor Central Stadium in Tashkent instead of Nasaf's regular Markaziy Stadium in Qarshi. Match played behind closed doors due to the COVID-19 pandemic in Uzbekistan.

28 August 2020 13	Bunyodkor	1 – 1	Qizilqum Zarafshon	Olmaliq
18:30 UZT (UTC+5)	Giyosov 43'; A.Abdullayev (yellow card) 75'; Turaev (yellow card) 87'; Kodirkulov (yellow card) 90+1'	Report	Kilichev (yellow card) 28'; Kasmynin (yellow card) 33'; R.Margiev 80'; Boydullayev (yellow card) 89'	Stadium: Metallurg Stadium; Attendance: 0 Referee: Firdavs Norsafarov
Note: Match originally scheduled for 26 June, and then 8 August, but postponed twice due to the COVID-19 pandemic in Uzbekistan. Match played at the Metallurg Stadium in Olmaliq instead of Bunyodkor's regular Milliy Stadium in Tashkent. Match played behind closed doors due to the COVID-19 pandemic in Uzbekistan.

11 September 2020 14	Bunyodkur	2 – 1	Surkhon Termez	Tashkent
19:00 UZT (UTC+5)	I.Yuldashev (yellow card) 9'; R.Yuldashev 49' (yellow card) 90'; N.Tukhtasinov 51'; Turaev (yellow card) 82'; Kodirkulov (yellow card) 90+1'; A.Abdujalilov (yellow card) 90+2'; V.Nuriev (penalty missed) 90+4'	Report	A.Aliyev 76'; N.Khasanov (yellow card) 80'; B.Shaydulov (yellow card) 85'; J.Mehmonov (yellow card) 90+4'	Stadium: Bunyodkor Academy; Referee: Rahimbek Karimov

16 September 2020 15	Mash'al Mubarek	1 – 2	Bunyodkur	Muborak
17:30 UZT (UTC+5)	R.Davronov (red card) 1'; S.Kuziev 30'	Report	Giyosov 5' (pen.); A.Abdullayev (yellow card) 16'; Kobilov (yellow card) 61'; N.Tukhtasinov 69'	Stadium: Bahrom Vafoev Stadium; Referee: Temur Tukhtasinov

22 September 2020 16	Bunyodkur	2 – 3	AGMK	Tashkent
18:00 UZT (UTC+5)	Erkinov (yellow card) 21'; N.Tukhtasinov 35'; Giyosov 57' (pen.); R.Yuldashev (yellow card) 72'; Kodirkulov (yellow card) 87'	Report	Vatsadze 15'; Grigalashvili 48'; M.Sulaymanov (yellow card) 69'; J.Umarov 88'	Stadium: Milliy Stadium; Referee: Jasur Mukhtorov

27 September 2020 17	Kokand 1912	2 – 1	Bunyodkor	Kokand
16:00 UZT (UTC+5)	S.Norbekov 12'; I.Malikjonov 26'; Josović (yellow card) 60'	Report	Erkinov 6'; S.Izzatov (yellow card) 84'; Turaev (yellow card) 90+2'	Stadium: Central Stadium; Referee: Zokir Kadyrov

19 October 2020 19	Lokomotiv Tashkent	2 – 1	Bunyodkor	Tashkent
18:00 UZT (UTC+5)	Abdukholiqov 29'; Bikmaev (yellow card) 45+1'; K.Maharadze (yellow card) 67'; Pogrebnyak 69'; I.Ganikhonov (yellow card) 90+4'	Report	Giyosov (yellow card) 39'; Kobilov (yellow card) 67'; N.Tukhtasinov 87'	Stadium: Lokomotiv Stadium; Attendance: 203; Referee: Firdavs Norsafarov

22 October 2020 20	Bunyodkor	6 – 2	Andijon	Tashkent
18:00 UZT (UTC+5)	M.Kahramonov 3'; I.Yuldashev 6'; Giyosov 12'; Erkinov 48'; N.Tukhtasinov 67'; Turaev 77'	Report	S.Zhumaboev 9'; D.Abdumannopov 90'	Stadium: Milliy Stadium; Referee: Akobir Shukrullaev

27 October 2020 21	Navbahor Namangan	2 – 1	Bunyodkor	Namangan
17:00 UZT (UTC+5)	Turgunboev 31'; M.Gofurov (yellow card) 35'; D.Khoshimov (yellow card) 51'; Bolov 56'; Panjshanbe (yellow card) 64'; Solovyov (yellow card) 64'; S.Makhmudkhozhiev (yellow card) 77'; Ibrokhimov (yellow card) 90+4'	Report	Giyosov 45' (pen.); D.Axmadaliev (yellow card) 64'; Ergashev (yellow card) 66'	Stadium: Markaziy Stadium; Attendance: 1,000; Referee: Zokir Kadyrov

2 November 2020 22	Bunyodkor	1 – 1	Buxoro	Tashkent
17:00 UZT (UTC+5)	Erkinov 1'; Kobilov (yellow card) 25'	Report	J.Shodmonov (yellow card) 3'; A.Kamolov (yellow card) 38'; Z.Pirimov (yellow card) 60'; I.Abdullaev 90+2'	Stadium: Pakhtakor Central Stadium; Attendance: 56; Referee: Rahimbek Karimov
Note: Match held at the Pakhtakor Central Stadium in Tashkent, instead of Bunyodkor's regular Milliy Stadium in Tashkent.

5 November 2020 18	Bunyodkor	3 – 2	Pakhtakor Tashkent	Tashkent
17:00 UZT (UTC+5)	N.Tukhtasinov 5', 55'; R.Yuldashev (yellow card) 20'; M.Mirakhmadov 81'; S.Izzatov (yellow card) 84'; A.Abdujalilov (yellow card) 85'	Report	Sergeev (yellow card) 21'; Masharipov 26' (red card) 83'; Alijonov (yellow card) 38' (yellow-red card) 82'; Krimets (yellow card) 38'; A.Abdullayev 80' (o.g.)	Stadium: Bunyodkor Academy; Attendance: 1,510; Referee: Akhrol Risqulloev
Note: Match held at the Pakhtakor Central Stadium in Tashkent, instead of Bunyodkor's regular Milliy Stadium in Tashkent. Match originally scheduled for 4 October 2020

20 November 2020 23	Metallurg Bekabad	2 – 3	Bunyodkor	Bekabad
15:00 UZT (UTC+5)	M.Isaev (yellow card) 9'; M.Bobojonov (yellow card) 33'; Ubaydullaev 86'; Z.Abdullaev 90+1'	Report	Giyosov 5'; N.Tukhtasinov (yellow card) 33'; M.Mirakhmadov 22', 65'; A.Abdujalilov (yellow card) 90+3'	Stadium: Metallurg Bekabad Stadium; Attendance: 188; Referee: Victor Serazitdinov

25 November 2020 24	Bunyodkor	1 – 0	Sogdiana Jizzakh	Tashkent
16:45 UZT (UTC+5)	A.Abdullayev (yellow card) 9'; Giyosov 64'	Report	S.Shikhov (yellow card) 15' (red card) 59'; Kolaković (yellow card) 65'; S.Jurabekov (yellow card) 69'; Norkhonov (yellow card) 90'	Stadium: Milliy Stadium; Attendance: 573; Referee: Firdavs Norsafarov

29 November 2020 25	Bunyodkor	0 – 1	Nasaf	Tashkent
14:30 UZT (UTC+5)	Ergashev (yellow card) 70' (yellow-red card) 89'	Report	Stanojević 8'; Eshmurodov (yellow card) 74'; J.Esonkulov (yellow card) 89'	Stadium: Milliy Stadium; Attendance: 659; Referee: Zokir Kadyrov

3 December 2020 26	Qizilqum Zarafshon	1 – 1	Bunyodkor	Zarafshan
14:00 UZT (UTC+5)	M.Ubaydullaev (yellow card) 19'; F.Kambarov (yellow card) 34'; J.Azimov 76'; K.Nurmetov (yellow card) 90+3'	Report	Kodirkulov (yellow card) 6' (goal) 29'; I.Yuldashev (yellow card) 83'	Stadium: Progress Stadium; Attendance: 500; Referee: Akhrol Riskulloev

=== Uzbek Cup ===
7 December 2020 Round of 16	Qizilqum Zarafshon	3 – 1	Bunyodkor	Zarafshan
16:00 UZT (UTC+5)	M.Kosimov 43'; J.Azimov 52'; O.Tolmasov 70'; Boydullayev (yellow card) 90+3'	Report	S.Izzatov (yellow card) 16'; Turaev (yellow card) 42'; M.Mirakhmadov 77' (yellow card) 84'	Stadium: Progress Stadium; Attendance: 356; Referee: Vadim Agishev

=== AFC Champions League ===
==== Qualifying rounds ====
22 January 2020 Preliminary round 2	Bunyodkor (Uzbekistan)	4 – 1	(Iraq) Al-Zawraa	Tashkent, Uzbekistan
14:00 UZT (UTC+5)	Kholmukhamedov 8' (pen.); Jaloliddinov (yellow card) 45'; K.Murtazaev 46', 85'; S.Izzatov (yellow card) 76'; B.Farkhadov 80'; D.Axmadaliev (yellow card) 86'	Report	Nzambé (yellow card) 7'; Qasim 89'	Stadium: JAR Stadium; Attendance: 594; Referee: Yudai Yamamoto (Japan)
Note: Match originally scheduled to be played on 21 January 2020, but rescheduled to 22 January 2020, to avoid a clash with the Lokomotiv Tashkent v Istiklol match, also played in Tashkent, on the same day.

28 January 2020 Play-off round	Al-Ain (United Arab Emirates)	1 – 0	(Uzbekistan) Bunyodkor	Al Ain, United Arab Emirates
19:40 UZT (UTC+5)	Barman (yellow card) 38'; Saeed 78'; S.Abdullah (yellow card) 90+1'	Report		Stadium: Hazza Bin Zayed Stadium; Attendance: 4,424; Referee: Ko Hyung-jin (South Korea)

== Squad statistics ==
As of match played 7 December 2020

=== Appearances and goals ===
No.	Pos	Nat	Player	Total		Uzbek Super League		Uzbek Cup		AFC Champions League	
No.	Pos	Nat	Player	Apps	Goals	Apps	Goals	Apps	Goals	Apps	Goals
1	GK	(Uzbekistan) UZB	Abdumavlon Abdujalilov	21	0	18	0	1	0	2	0
2	DF	(Uzbekistan) UZB	Sukhrob Yarashev	1	0	0	0	0	0	1	0
3	DF	(Uzbekistan) UZB	Islom Kobilov	26	1	25	1	1	0	0	0
4	DF	(Tajikistan) TJK	Davron Ergashev	9	0	4+4	0	0	0	0+1	0
6	DF	(Uzbekistan) UZB	Anvar Gafurov	15	0	8+5	0	0	0	2	0
7	DF	(Uzbekistan) UZB	Dilshodbek Axmadaliev	20	1	10+8	1	0	0	2	0
10	MF	(Uzbekistan) UZB	Khursid Giyosov	17	8	16	8	1	0	0	0
11	MF	(Uzbekistan) UZB	Rasul Yuldashev	20	1	16+3	1	1	0	0	0
13	MF	(Uzbekistan) UZB	Lutfulla Turaev	28	2	25	2	1	0	2	0
14	FW	(Uzbekistan) UZB	Mirjakhon Mirakhmadov	17	4	8+8	3	0+1	1	0	0
15	MF	(Uzbekistan) UZB	Gairat Azizkhodjaev	1	0	1	0	0	0	0	0
17	MF	(Uzbekistan) UZB	Sanjar Kodirkulov	26	1	23+2	1	1	0	0	0
19	MF	(Uzbekistan) UZB	Nurillo Tukhtasinov	25	11	25	11	0	0	0	0
20	FW	(Uzbekistan) UZB	Vladislav Nuriev	5	0	0+5	0	0	0	0	0
22	MF	(Uzbekistan) UZB	Sardor Abduraymov	3	0	0+1	0	0	0	2	0
24	FW	(Uzbekistan) UZB	Bahodir Pardaev	3	0	0+3	0	0	0	0	0
26	DF	(Uzbekistan) UZB	Ulugbek Abdullayev	11	0	6+4	0	1	0	0	0
30	MF	(Uzbekistan) UZB	Abdulla Abdullayev	25	0	21+3	0	1	0	0	0
34	MF	(Uzbekistan) UZB	Sukhrob Izzatov	20	1	2+15	1	1	0	2	0
35	MF	(Uzbekistan) UZB	Ibrohim Ibrohimov	3	0	1+2	0	0	0	0	0
37	DF	(Uzbekistan) UZB	Mukhammadodil Kakhramonov	9	1	4+4	1	0+1	0	0	0
43	DF	(Uzbekistan) UZB	Ibrokhimkhalil Yuldashev	22	1	21	1	1	0	0	0
46	FW	(Uzbekistan) UZB	Azadzhon Azimzhonov	1	0	1	0	0	0	0	0
48	MF	(Uzbekistan) UZB	Valeriy Akopov	7	0	6+1	0	0	0	0	0
49	MF	(Uzbekistan) UZB	Farrukh Ikramov	23	1	4+16	1	0+1	0	0+2	0
70	DF	(Uzbekistan) UZB	Murod Kholmukhamedov	2	1	0	0	0	0	2	1
71	GK	(Uzbekistan) UZB	Sarvar Karimov	9	0	8	0	0+1	0	0	0
77	FW	(Turkmenistan) TKM	Selim Nurmuradov	18	2	4+13	2	0	0	1	0
90	FW	(Uzbekistan) UZB	Shakhboz Erkinov	24	5	16+7	5	1	0	0	0
	MF	(Uzbekistan) UZB	Khasan Yuldoshev	1	0	0	0	0	0	1	0
Players away on loan:
5	DF	(Uzbekistan) UZB	Bobur Farhodov	2	1	0	0	0	0	0+2	1
Players who left Bunyodkor during the season:
8	MF	(Uzbekistan) UZB	Jasurbek Jaloliddinov	10	1	8	1	0	0	2	0
21	MF	(Uzbekistan) UZB	Gulom-Haydar Gulyamov	3	1	1	1	0	0	1+1	0
92	FW	(Uzbekistan) UZB	Khumoyun Murtazaev	9	3	5+2	1	0	0	2	2

=== Goal scorers ===
Place	Position	Nation	Number	Name	Uzbek Super League	Uzbekistan Cup	AFC Champions League	Total
1	MF	(Uzbekistan)	19	Nurillo Tukhtasinov	11	0	0	11
2	MF	(Uzbekistan)	10	Khursid Giyosov	8	0	0	8
3	FW	(Uzbekistan)	90	Shakhboz Erkinov	5	0	0	5
4	FW	(Uzbekistan)	14	Mirjakhon Mirakhmadov	3	1	0	4
5	FW	(Uzbekistan)	92	Khumoyun Murtazaev	1	0	2	3
6	FW	(Turkmenistan)	77	Selim Nurmuradov	2	0	0	2
6	MF	(Uzbekistan)	13	Lutfulla Turaev	2	0	0	2
8	MF	(Uzbekistan)	49	Farrukh Ikramov	1	0	0	1
8	MF	(Uzbekistan)	8	Jasurbek Jaloliddinov	1	0	0	1
8	MF	(Uzbekistan)	21	Gulom-Haydar Gulyamov	1	0	0	1
8	DF	(Uzbekistan)	7	Dilshodbek Axmadaliev	1	0	0	1
8	DF	(Uzbekistan)	3	Islom Kobilov	1	0	0	1
8	MF	(Uzbekistan)	34	Sukhrob Izzatov	1	0	0	1
8	MF	(Uzbekistan)	11	Rasul Yuldashev	1	0	0	1
8	DF	(Uzbekistan)	37	Mukhammadodil Kakhramonov	1	0	0	1
8	DF	(Uzbekistan)	43	Ibrokhimkhalil Yuldashev	1	0	0	1
8	MF	(Uzbekistan)	17	Sanjar Kodirkulov	1	0	0	1
8	DF	(Uzbekistan)	70	Murod Kholmukhamedov	0	0	1	1
8	DF	(Uzbekistan)	5	Bobur Farhodov	0	0	1	1
8				Own goal	1	0	0	1
				TOTALS	43	1	4	48

=== Clean sheets ===
Place	Position	Nation	Number	Name	Uzbek Super League	Uzbekistan Cup	AFC Champions League	Total
1	GK	(Uzbekistan)	1	Abdumavlon Abdujalilov	4	0	0	4
2	GK	(Uzbekistan)	71	Sarvar Karimov	2	0	0	2
				TOTALS	6	0	0	6

=== Disciplinary record ===
Number	Nation	Position	Name	Uzbek Super League		Uzbekistan Cup		AFC Champions League		Total	
Number	Nation	Position	Name	Yellow card	Red card	Yellow card	Red card	Yellow card	Red card	Yellow card	Red card
1	(Uzbekistan)	GK	Abdumavlon Abdujalilov	3	0	0	0	0	0	3	0
3	(Uzbekistan)	DF	Islom Kobilov	5	0	0	0	0	0	5	0
4	(Tajikistan)	DF	Davron Ergashev	3	1	0	0	0	0	3	1
6	(Uzbekistan)	DF	Anvar Gafurov	1	0	0	0	0	0	1	0
7	(Uzbekistan)	DF	Dilshodbek Axmadaliev	3	0	0	0	1	0	4	0
8	(Uzbekistan)	MF	Jasurbek Jaloliddinov	2	0	0	0	1	0	3	0
10	(Uzbekistan)	MF	Khursid Giyosov	1	0	0	0	0	0	1	0
11	(Uzbekistan)	MF	Rasul Yuldashev	4	0	0	0	0	0	4	0
13	(Uzbekistan)	MF	Lutfulla Turaev	7	0	1	0	0	0	8	0
14	(Uzbekistan)	FW	Mirjakhon Mirakhmadov	0	0	1	0	0	0	1	0
17	(Uzbekistan)	MF	Sanjar Kodirkulov	6	0	0	0	0	0	6	0
19	(Uzbekistan)	MF	Nurillo Tukhtasinov	4	1	0	0	0	0	4	1
30	(Uzbekistan)	MF	Abdulla Abdullayev	4	0	0	0	0	0	4	0
34	(Uzbekistan)	MF	Sukhrob Izzatov	2	0	1	0	1	0	4	0
43	(Uzbekistan)	DF	Ibrokhimkhalil Yuldashev	4	0	0	0	0	0	4	0
49	(Uzbekistan)	MF	Farrukh Ikramov	1	0	0	0	0	0	1	0
90	(Uzbekistan)	FW	Shakhboz Erkinov	1	0	0	0	0	0	1	0
Players who left Bunyodkor during the season:
			TOTALS	51	2	3	0	3	0	57	2
