= 2019 FC Bunyodkor season =

FC Bunyodkor
2019 season
- Chairman: Bedil Alimov
- Manager: Vadim Abramov
- Uzbek League: 3rd
- Uzbekistan Cup: Semifinal
- League Cup: Group Stage
- Top goalscorer: League: Khursid Giyosov (12); All: Khursid Giyosov (14)
Home colours	Away colours

The 2019 season was FC Bunyodkor's 13th season in the Uzbek League in Uzbekistan.

== Squad ==
As of match played 30 November 2019

No.	Name	Nationality	Position	Date of birth (age)	Signed from	Signed in	Contract ends	Apps.	Goals
Goalkeepers
1	Abdumavlon Abdujalilov	(Uzbekistan)	GK	22 December 1994 (aged 24)	Neftchi Fergana	2019		18	0
25	Murod Zukhurov	(Uzbekistan)	GK	23 February 1983 (aged 36)	Nasaf	2013			
50	Jasurbek Umrzoqov	(Uzbekistan)	GK	16 February 2000 (aged 19)	Youth Team	2018		0	0
74	Eldor Adhamov	(Uzbekistan)	GK	2 June 1996 (aged 23)	Youth Team	2017		1	0
Defenders
2	Kemran Najafaliev	(Uzbekistan)	DF	30 November 1998 (aged 21)	Youth Team	2019		2	0
3	Islom Kobilov	(Uzbekistan)	DF	1 April 1997 (aged 22)	Metallurg Bekabad	2017		45	3
5	Bobur Farhodov	(Uzbekistan)	DF	11 February 1996 (aged 23)	Youth Team	2019		16	0
6	Anvar Gafurov	(Uzbekistan)	DF	14 May 1982 (aged 37)	Obod	2017			
7	Dilshodbek Axmadaliev	(Uzbekistan)	DF	2 November 1994 (aged 25)	Youth Team	2016		47	6
11	Javohir Kakhramanov	(Uzbekistan)	DF	21 March 1996 (aged 23)	Buxoro	2019		29	2
15	Burhan Usmanov	(Uzbekistan)	DF	20 February 1998 (aged 21)	Obod	2018		0	0
26	Ulugbek Abdullayev	(Uzbekistan)	DF	22 February 1998 (aged 21)	Youth Team	2019		10	0
29	Sardorbek Khursandov	(Uzbekistan)	DF	29 March 2000 (aged 19)	Youth Team	2019		0	0
37	Mukhammadodil Kakhramonov	(Uzbekistan)	DF	10 March 1996 (aged 23)	Metallurg Bekabad	2019		5	0
38	Jasur Holdorov	(Uzbekistan)	DF	20 March 2001 (aged 18)	Youth Team	2019		0	0
45	Mardon Abdullaev	(Uzbekistan)	DF	30 October 2000 (aged 19)	Youth Team	2019		0	0
	Sanzhar Tursunov	(Uzbekistan)	DF	29 December 1986 (aged 32)	Daejeon Citizen	2019		11	1
Midfielders
8	Jasurbek Jaloliddinov	(Uzbekistan)	MF	15 May 2002 (aged 17)	Youth Team	2018		23	3
10	Khursid Giyosov	(Uzbekistan)	MF	13 April 1995 (aged 24)	Youth Team	2014		75	19
13	Lutfulla Turaev	(Uzbekistan)	MF	30 March 1988 (aged 31)	AGMK	2019		106	16
17	Sanjar Kodirkulov	(Uzbekistan)	MF	27 May 1997 (aged 22)	Youth Team	2016		48	3
19	Nurillo Tukhtasinov	(Uzbekistan)	MF	19 February 1997 (aged 22)	Sogdiana Jizzakh	2019		55	8
23	Sanjar Rixsiboev	(Uzbekistan)	MF	16 October 1993 (aged 26)	AGMK	2019		10	1
28	Hasan Yuldashev	(Uzbekistan)	MF		Youth Team	2019		0	0
30	Abdulla Abdullayev	(Uzbekistan)	MF	1 September 997 (aged 1022)	Youth Team	2018		39	2
31	Abdulhay Ismoilov	(Uzbekistan)	MF	8 February 2000 (aged 19)	Youth Team	2019		0	0
32	Islam Karimov	(Uzbekistan)	MF		Youth Team	2019		0	0
33	Diyor Rahimkulov	(Uzbekistan)	MF	21 January 2002 (aged 17)	Youth Team	2019		0	0
34	Sukhrob Izzatov	(Uzbekistan)	MF	15 February 1999 (aged 20)	Youth Team	2017		17	1
35	Ibrahim Ibrahimov	(Uzbekistan)	MF		Youth Team	2019		0	0
41	Habib Karimov	(Uzbekistan)	MF		Youth Team	2019		0	0
42	Muzaffar Olimzhonov	(Uzbekistan)	MF	24 July 2001 (aged 18)	Youth Team	2019		0	0
44	Ziyovuddin Ahadov	(Uzbekistan)	MF		Youth Team	2019		0	0
47	Oybek Hamidov	(Uzbekistan)	MF		Youth Team	2019		0	0
48	Valeriy Akopov	(Uzbekistan)	MF	9 February 2000 (aged 19)	Youth Team	2019		2	0
49	Farrukh Ikramov	(Uzbekistan)	MF	9 July 1998 (aged 21)	Youth Team	2017		29	2
	Shohrux Gadoyev	(Uzbekistan)	MF	31 December 1991 (aged 27)	Daejeon Citizen	2019		45	8
	Yevhen Chumak	(Ukraine)	MF	25 August 1995 (aged 24)	Shevardeni-1906 Tbilisi	2019		4	1
Forwards
14	Buronbek Mirzasalimov	(Uzbekistan)	FW	25 March 2002 (aged 17)	Youth Team	2019		0	0
18	Vladislav Nuriev	(Uzbekistan)	FW	20 February 1996 (aged 23)		2019		13	2
20	Jamshid Bakhshulloev	(Uzbekistan)	FW	24 January 2001 (aged 18)	Youth Team	2019		0	0
36	Jahongir Abdusalomov	(Uzbekistan)	FW	21 May 1999 (aged 20)	Youth Team	2018		3	0
39	Mirjakhon Mirakhmadov	(Uzbekistan)	FW	15 July 1997 (aged 22)	Youth Team	2016		46	11
	Dmitri Ostrovski	(Russia)	FW	15 April 1997 (aged 22)		2019		4	0
Players away on loan
9	Sardorbek Azimov	(Uzbekistan)	MF	1 June 1995 (aged 24)	Sogdiana Jizzakh	2019		30	1
Players who left during the season
4	Sergey Prokhorov	(Uzbekistan)	MF	16 October 1996 (aged 23)	loan from Lokomotiv Tashkent	2019		3	0
27	Abubakir Muydinov	(Uzbekistan)	DF	7 July 2000 (aged 19)	Youth Team	2019		1	0
70	Nodir Mavlonov	(Uzbekistan)	MF	28 January 1996 (aged 23)	Youth Team	2019		0	0

== Transfers ==
=== Winter ===
In: Note: Flags indicate national team as defined under FIFA eligibility rules; some limited exceptions apply. Players may hold more than one non-FIFA nationality.

No.	Pos.	Nation	Player
4	MF	UZB	Sergey Prokhorov (from (Uzbekistan) Lokomotiv Tashkent)
9	MF	UZB	Sardorbek Azimov (from (Uzbekistan) Sogdiana Jizzakh)
11	DF	UZB	Javohir Kakhramanov (from (Uzbekistan) Buxoro)
13	MF	UZB	Lutfulla Turaev (from (Uzbekistan) AGMK)
19	MF	UZB	Nurillo Tukhtasinov (from (Uzbekistan) Sogdiana Jizzakh)

Out: Note: Flags indicate national team as defined under FIFA eligibility rules; some limited exceptions apply. Players may hold more than one non-FIFA nationality.

No.	Pos.	Nation	Player
2	MF	UZB	Rustam Ashurmatov (to (South Korea) Gwangju)
4	DF	UZB	Akramjon Komilov (to (Uzbekistan) Pakhtakor Tashkent)
5	DF	UZB	Dilshod Juraev (to (Uzbekistan) AGMK)
6	DF	UZB	Anvar Gafurov (to (Uzbekistan) AGMK)
8	MF	UZB	Jovlon Ibrokhimov (to (South Korea) Suwon)
9	FW	UZB	Shahzodbek Nurmatov (to (Uzbekistan) AGMK)
11	DF	UZB	Murod Toshmatov (to (Uzbekistan) AGMK)
18	MF	UZB	Sardor Sabirkhodjaev (to (Uzbekistan) Pakhtakor Tashkent)
20	MF	UZB	Mirgiyos Suleymanov (to (Uzbekistan) AGMK)
32	GK	UZB	Suhrobjon Sultonov (to (Uzbekistan) AGMK)
44	MF	UZB	Mirjamol Kosimov (to (Uzbekistan) AGMK)
99	FW	SRB	Filip Rajevac (to (Uzbekistan) Lokomotiv Tashkent)
—	MF	UZB	Azizbek Haydarov (to (Uzbekistan) Lokomotiv Tashkent)

=== Summer ===
In: Note: Flags indicate national team as defined under FIFA eligibility rules; some limited exceptions apply. Players may hold more than one non-FIFA nationality.

No.	Pos.	Nation	Player
—	MF	UKR	Yevhen Chumak (from (Georgia (country)) Shevardeni-1906 Tbilisi)
—	MF	UZB	Shohrux Gadoyev (from (South Korea) Daejeon Citizen)
—	FW	RUS	Dmitri Ostrovski

Out: Note: Flags indicate national team as defined under FIFA eligibility rules; some limited exceptions apply. Players may hold more than one non-FIFA nationality.

No.	Pos.	Nation	Player
4	MF	UZB	Sergey Prokhorov (loan return to (Uzbekistan) Lokomotiv Tashkent)
9	MF	UZB	Sardorbek Azimov (loan to (Uzbekistan) Andijon)
27	DF	UZB	Abubakir Muydinov (to (United Arab Emirates) Al-Nasr)
70	MF	UZB	Nodir Mavlonov (to (Uzbekistan) Navbahor Namangan)
—	MF	UZB	Abbos Zhumakulov (loan to (Uzbekistan) Buxoro)

== Friendlies ==
27 February 2019	Bunyodkor (Uzbekistan)	2 – 2	(Tajikistan) Khujand	Tashkent, Uzbekistan
15:00 (UTC+5)	A.Begimkulov 2' (o.g.); Giyosov 68' (pen.)	Report	Chakalov 51'; Ahmadov 75' (pen.)	Stadium: Bunyodkor Academy Training Ground

12 October 2019	Khujand (Tajikistan)	2 – 2 (5 – 4 p)	(Uzbekistan) Bunyodkor	Khujand, Tajikistan
(UTC+5)	D.Bozorov 28'; Chakalov 44'	Report	D.Ostrovski 32'; Gadoyev 52'	Stadium: 20 Years of Independence Stadium; Referee: Khurshed Dadobev

== Competitions ==
=== Uzbek League ===
==== League table ====
Pos	Team	Pld	W	D	L	GF	GA	GD	Pts	Qualification
1	Pakhtakor (C)	26	22	3	1	75	18	+57	69	Qualification for AFC Champions League group stage
2	Lokomotiv (Q)	26	13	10	3	40	17	+23	49	Qualification for AFC Champions League preliminary round 2 (Note: Since league champions Pakhtakor were also Uzbekistan Cup winners, the league 3rd place qualified for the AFC Champions League preliminary round 2.)
3	Bunyodkor (Q)	26	12	7	7	37	33	+4	43	Qualification for AFC Champions League preliminary round 2
4	Sogdiana	26	11	7	8	29	29	0	40	
5	Metallurg	26	9	8	9	33	26	+7	35	

Source: Uzbekistan Professional Football League
Rules for classification: 1) Points; 2) Goal difference; 3) Number of goals scored.
(C) Champions; (Q) Qualified for the phase indicated

==== Results summary ====
Overall								Home						Away					
Pld	W	D	L	GF	GA	GD	Pts	W	D	L	GF	GA	GD	W	D	L	GF	GA	GD
26	12	7	7	37	33	+4	43	7	4	2	21	14	+7	5	3	5	16	19	−3

Last updated: 30 November 2019.
Source: See Results

==== Results by round ====
Round	1	2	3	4	5	6	7	8	9	10	11	12	13	14	15	16	17	18	19	20	21	22	23	24	25	26
Ground	A	H	A	H	A	A	A	H	A	A	H	A	A	H	H	A	H	H	A	H	A	A	A	H	A	H
Result	L	L	W	W	W	D	L	W	D	W	D	L	W	W	W	L	W	D	L	W	D	L	D	W	W	D
Position	12	14	9	6	3	4	6	3	5	4	3	7	5	4	3	4	3	3	3	3	3	3	4	3	3	3

Source: See Results
A = Away; H = Home; W = Win; D = Draw; L = Loss

==== Results ====
10 March 2019 1	Sogdiana Jizzakh	2 – 1	Bunyodkor	Jizzakh
18:00 UZT (UTC+5)	D.Toshmatov 23' (yellow card) 57'; E.Oripov (yellow card) 60'; O.Nurmatov 89'; I.Abdullaev (yellow card) 90+5'	Report	Giyosov (yellow card) 23'; A.Abdullayev (yellow card) 54'; D.Axmadaliev (yellow card) 57'; Kodirkulov 63'; N.Tukhtasinov (yellow card) 90+2'	Stadium: Sogdiana Stadium; Attendance: 7,780; Referee: Timur Tukhtasinov

31 March 2019 2	Bunyodkor	1 – 2	Pakhtakor Tashkent	Tashkent
14:00 UZT (UTC+5)	Kodirkulov (yellow card) 4'; M.Mirakhmadov 35'	Report	Khamdamov 17'; Ćeran 63'; Krimets (yellow card) 82'	Stadium: Milliy Stadium; Attendance: 18,770; Referee: Ravshan Irmatov

6 April 2019 3	Navbahor Namangan	2 – 3	Bunyodkor	Namangan
17:00 UZT (UTC+5)	Z.Turayev (yellow card) 12'; A.Akhmedov (yellow card) 19'; Lukić (yellow card) 32'; O.O'runov (yellow card) 50'; A.Isroilov (yellow card) 61'; Kasyan 64' (pen.); A.Gulomov 79'; D.Mekhmonov (yellow card) 81'	Report	Jaloliddinov 5'; S.Prokhorov (yellow card) 9'; Giyosov 37' (pen.), 85' (pen.) (yellow card) 87'	Stadium: Markaziy Stadium; Attendance: 7,282; Referee: Ilgiz Tantashev

13 April 2019 4	Bunyodkor	1 – 0	Andijon	Tashkent
15:00 UZT (UTC+5)	N.Tukhtasinov (yellow card) 45'; Jaloliddinov 56'	Report	B.Omonov (yellow card) 32'; A.Khusinov (yellow card) 68'	Stadium: Milliy Stadium; Attendance: 2,415; Referee: Akhrol Riskullaev

20 April 2019 5	AGMK	0 – 1	Bunyodkor	Olmaliq
17:15 UZT (UTC+5)	S.Shikhov (yellow card) 31'; B.Yuldashov (yellow card) 84'; J.Khakimov (yellow card) 90+1'	Report	Turaev 39'; M.Mirakhmadov (yellow card) 43'	Stadium: AGMK Stadium; Attendance: 1,420; Referee: Akobirxuja Shukurullaev

26 April 2019 6	Buxoro	2 – 2	Bunyodkor	Bukhara
19:35 UZT (UTC+5)	A.Bakhritdinov (yellow card) 25'; E.Ismoilov (yellow card) 34'; Nagaev 48'; D.Ibrokhimov 52' (yellow card) 89'; Fatić (yellow card) 73'	Report	Kodirkulov (yellow card) 18'; Giyosov 40', 69'	Stadium: Buxoro Arena; Attendance: 15,547; Referee: Shavkat Nasibullayev

5 May 2019 7	Qizilqum Zarafshon	1 – 0	Bunyodkor	Navoiy
19:45 UZT (UTC+5)	Grigalashvili 64' (pen.); K.Olimov (yellow card) 78'; Boydullayev (yellow card) 81'; S.Djuraev (yellow card) 90+1'	Report	Turaev (yellow card) 13'; Kobilov (yellow card) 64'	Stadium: Yoshlar Stadium; Attendance: 7,621; Referee: Asker Nadjafaliev

12 May 2019 8	Bunyodkor	2 – 1	Kokand 1912	Tashkent
17:15 UZT (UTC+5)	Giyosov 13' (pen.), 85' (pen.) (yellow card) 90+3'; A.Abdujalilov (yellow card) 33'; Kobilov (yellow card) 73'; N.Tukhtasinov (yellow card) 76'; S.Izzatov (yellow card) 90+5'	Report	M.Hasanov (yellow card) 40'; S.Berdyev 64'; D.Khasanov (yellow card) 88'	Stadium: Milliy Stadium; Attendance: 3,284; Referee: Timur Tukhtasinov

17 May 2019 9	Lokomotiv Tashkent	0 – 0	Bunyodkor	Tashkent
18:45 UZT (UTC+5)	Khashimov (yellow card) 32'; Turapov (yellow card) 90+1'	Report	Gafurov (yellow card) 80'; S.Izzatov (yellow card) 90+3'	Stadium: Lokomotiv Stadium; Attendance: 3,112; Referee: Akhrol Riskullaev

25 May 2019 10	Metallurg Bekabad	0 – 2	Bunyodkor	Bekabad
14:00 UZT (UTC+5)		Report	N.Tukhtasinov 35'; Kobilov (yellow card) 45+1'; M.Mirakhmadov 65'	Stadium: Metallurg Bekabad Stadium; Attendance: 5,821; Referee: Jasur Muxtarov

16 June 2019 11	Bunyodkor	1 – 1	Nasaf	Tashkent
18:00 UZT (UTC+5)	Kobilov 8'	Report	D.Saitov 36'; S.Abduraymov (yellow card) 38'; S.Nasrullayev (yellow card) 54'; I.Rashidkhanov (yellow card) 90+4'; O.Bozorov (yellow card) 90+4'	Stadium: Milliy Stadium; Attendance: 3,487; Referee: Valentin Kovalenko

23 June 2019 12	Surkhon	2 – 0	Bunyodkor	Termez
18:00 UZT (UTC+5)	X.Gofurov 19' (yellow card) 33'; Bubanja 40'; Hojiakbarov (yellow card) 90+1'	Report	S.Izzatov (yellow card) 47'; N.Tukhtasinov (yellow card) 55'; Kobilov (yellow card) 57'	Stadium: Surkhon Stadium; Attendance: 6,320; Referee: Khasan Ruziev

28 June 2019 13	Dinamo Samarqand	1 – 2	Bunyodkor	Samarkand
18:00 UZT (UTC+5)	H.A'lamkhonov (yellow card) 9'; S.Baratov 63'; D.Urunov (yellow card) 85'	Report	M.Mirakhmadov 30'; S.Izzatov (yellow card) 37'; Giyosov 87' (pen.); Gafurov (yellow card) 89'; B.Farhodov (yellow card) 90+3'	Stadium: Dinamo Samarkand Stadium; Attendance: 9,271; Referee: Akhrol Riskullaev

27 July 2019 14	Bunyodkor	4 – 2	Dinamo Samarqand	Samarkand
18:00 UZT (UTC+5)	Chumak 12'; J.Kakhramanov (yellow card) 23'; M.Mirakhmadov 26', 57'; N.Tukhtasinov (yellow card) 32'; Giyosov 40', 40+1' (pen.)	Report	S.Abdurahmonov (yellow card) 32'; I.Toshpulatov 44', 75'; J.Azimov (yellow card) 90+1'	Stadium: Dinamo Samarkand Stadium; Attendance: 1,130; Referee: Firdvas Norsafarov
Note: Match played at the Dinamo Samarkand Stadium in Samarkand, instead of Bunyodkor's usually Milliy Stadium in Tashkent

31 July 2019 15	Bunyodkor	3 – 0	Surkhon Termez	Tashkent
18:00 UZT (UTC+5)	J.Kakhramanov 36'; Turaev (yellow card) 45'; Kodirkulov (yellow card) 72' (goal) 74'; N.Tukhtasinov 90+3'	Report	E.Baymatov (yellow card) 54'	Stadium: Lokomotiv Stadium; Attendance: 1,355; Referee: Akhrol Riskullaev
Note: Match played at the Lokomotiv Stadium in Tashkent, instead of Bunyodkor's usually Milliy Stadium in Tashkent

11 August 2019 16	Nasaf	3 – 1	Bunyodkor	Qarshi
20:00 UZT (UTC+5)	Ganiev 26' (pen.); G.Gaybullaev (yellow card) 38'; B.Abdukhalikov 55'; S.Mukhiddinov (yellow card) 77'; K.Murtazaev 90+3' (yellow card) 90+3'	Report	Turaev (yellow card) 25'; Gadoyev (yellow card) 65' (goal) 90'; B.Farhodov (yellow card) 77'	Stadium: Markaziy Stadium; Attendance: 8,756; Referee: Zokir Kadyrov

17 August 2019 17	Bunyodkor	1 – 0	Metallurg Bekabad	Tashkent
17:00 UZT (UTC+5)	M.Mirakhmadov (yellow card) 48'; Giyosov 75'	Report		Stadium: JAR Stadium; Attendance: 2,162; Referee: Vadim Agishev

26 August 2019 18	Bunyodkor	1 – 1	Lokomotiv Tashkent	Tashkent
19:15 UZT (UTC+5)	Kobilov (yellow card) 43'; Tursunov 74' (pen.)	Report	Amanow (yellow card) 12' (goal) 23'; Karimov (yellow card) 65'	Stadium: Milliy Stadium; Attendance: 4,842; Referee: Viktor Serazetdinov

15 September 2019 19	Kokand 1912	3 – 0	Bunyodkor	Kokand
16:15 UZT (UTC+5)		Report	Kobilov (yellow card) 5'; Turaev (yellow card) 23'; J.Kakhramanov (yellow card) 57'; Giyosov (yellow card) 84'	Stadium: Kokand Markaziy Stadium; Attendance: 4,100; Referee: Khasan Ruziev

22 September 2019 20	Bunyodkor	2 – 1	Qizilqum Zarafshon	Tashkent
18:00 UZT (UTC+5)	M.Mirakhmadov 24'; A.Abdullayev 29'	Report	S.Mustafayev (yellow card) 5'; A.Sanayev (yellow card) 59'; Margiyev (yellow card) 69'; S.Abdullajonov 87'	Stadium: Milliy Stadium; Attendance: 1,231; Referee: Rustam Lutfullin

30 September 2019 21	Bunyodkor	1 – 1	Buxoro	Tashkent
18:15 UZT (UTC+5)	M.Mirakhmadov 40'; Turaev (yellow card) 53'	Report	M.Bobojonov (yellow card) 9'; J.Ubaydullaev 54'; R.Davronov (yellow card) 90+3'	Stadium: Milliy Stadium; Attendance: 615; Referee: Jasur Muxtarov

18 October 2019 22	Bunyodkor	0 – 2	AGMK	Tashkent
17:30 UZT (UTC+5)	Turaev (yellow card) 46'	Report	M.Toshmatov 29'; B.Yuldashov 45+2'; S.Rakhmatov (yellow card) 51'; Boydullayev (yellow card) 54'	Stadium: Milliy Stadium; Attendance: 585; Referee: Akobirxuja Shukurullaev

30 October 2019 23	Andijon	1 – 1	Bunyodkor	Andijan
17:00 UZT (UTC+5)	S.Azimov (yellow card) 19'; S.Ubaydullayev (yellow card) 50' (goal) 90+4'; R.Aleksić (yellow card) 60'; A.Khusinov (yellow card) 62'	Report	A.Abdullayev (yellow card) 24' (yellow-red card) 81'; Gafurov (yellow card) 35'; D.Ostrovski (yellow card) 47'; N.Tukhtasinov 90+2'	Stadium: Soghlom Avlod Stadium; Attendance: 6,425; Referee: Ilgiz Tantashev

24 November 2019 24	Bunyodkor	2 – 1	Navbahor Namangan	Tashkent
16:45 UZT (UTC+5)	N.Tukhtasinov 9'; Kobilov (yellow card) 14'; Giyosov 67' (pen.)	Report	Kasyan (yellow card) 10'; Turgunboev 34'; N.Mavlyanov (yellow card) 55'; Golban (yellow card) 82'; M.Gofurov (yellow card) 90+3'	Stadium: Milliy Stadium; Attendance: 1,045; Referee: Firdavs Norsafarov

27 November 2019 25	Pakhtakor Tashkent	2 – 3	Bunyodkor	Tashkent
16:00 UZT (UTC+5)	Sabirkhodjaev (yellow card) 33'; Sergeev 39', 67'; Bikmaev (yellow card) 45+2'; Krimets (yellow card) 88'	Report	N.Tukhtasinov 11' (yellow card) 69'; J.Kakhramanov 25'; Turaev (yellow card) 30'; Giyosov 90' (yellow card) 90'	Stadium: Pakhtakor Central Stadium; Attendance: 1,210; Referee: Jasur Muxtarov

30 November 2019 26	Bunyodkor	2 – 2	Sogdiana Jizzakh	Tashkent
15:00 UZT (UTC+5)	Kobilov 41'; N.Tukhtasinov 60'; M.Mirakhmadov (yellow card) 64'; A.Abdujalilov (yellow card) 89'; Kodirkulov (yellow card) 90+2'	Report	S.Rashidov (yellow card) 18'; Boltaboev (yellow card) 54'; Kobilov 61' (o.g.); S.Qulmatov (yellow card) 64'; Makharadze (yellow card) 75'	Stadium: Milliy Stadium; Attendance: 1,568; Referee: Timur Tukhtasinov

=== Uzbek Cup ===
19 June 2019 Second Round	Bunyodkor	2 – 1	Metallurg Bekabad	Tashkent
17:40 UZT (UTC+5)	D.Axmadaliev 73'; V.Nuriev 90'	Report	M.Muzaffarov 35'; Z.Abdullaev (yellow card) 80'	Stadium: Milliy Stadium; Attendance: 1,062; Referee: Viktor Serazitdinov.

3 August 2019 Round of 16	Bunyodkor	3 – 0	Qizilqum Zarafshon	Tashkent
17:40 UZT (UTC+5)	Giyosov 19'; Chumak 31'; Kodirkulov 58'; N.Tukhtasinov (yellow card) 64' (yellow-red card) 73'	Report	Totadze (yellow card) 46'; S.Mustafayev (yellow card) 64'; S.Djuraev (yellow card) 70'; Margiyev (yellow card) 73'	Stadium: Lokomotiv Stadium; Attendance: 667; Referee: Jasur Muxtarov
Note: Match played at the Lokomotiv Stadium in Tashkent, instead of Bunyodkor's usually Milliy Stadium in Tashkent

21 August 2019 Quarterfinals	Sogdiana Jizzakh	1 – 2	Bunyodkor	Jizzakh
19:15 UZT (UTC+5)	Hasanov 2' (yellow card) 35'; E.Oripov (yellow card) 17'; Makharadze (yellow card) 60'; Boltaboev (yellow card) 80'	Report	Turaev (yellow card) 35' (yellow-red card) 80'; Kodirkulov (yellow card) 35'; M.Mirakhmadov 55'; Tursunov (yellow card) 81'; Gadoyev 90+4' (yellow card) 90+5'	Stadium: Sogdiana Stadium; Attendance: 6,134; Referee: Aziz Asymov

26 September 2019 Semifinals	AGMK	3 – 1	Bunyodkor	Olmaliq
18:00 UZT (UTC+5)	Nurmatov 8' (yellow card) 40'; Juraev (yellow card) 45'; Grigalashvili 50' (yellow card) 62'; S.Rakhmatov (yellow card) 70'; S.Rakhmanov 85'	Report	N.Tukhtasinov 58' (yellow card) 71'; Tursunov (yellow card) 60'	Stadium: AGMK Stadium

=== League Cup ===
==== Group stage ====
===== Results =====
31 May 2019 1	Metallurg Bekabad	1 – 0	Bunyodkor	Bekabad
19:00 UZT (UTC+5)	S.Prokhorov 10'; M.Isaev (yellow card) 79'	Report	M.Kahramonov (yellow card) 26'	Stadium: Metallurg Bekabad Stadium; Attendance: 2,704

2 July 2019 2	Bunyodkor	3 – 1	Qizilqum Zarafshon	Tashkent
18:00 UZT (UTC+5)	S.Izzatov 26' (yellow card) 44'; Jaloliddinov (yellow card) 31' (goal) 79'; V.Nuriev 55'	Report	Smith 20'; M.Kasymov (yellow card) 45'; K.Olimov (yellow card) 57'	Stadium: Milliy Stadium; Attendance: 107; Referee: Ibrahim Ismailov

6 July 2019 3	AGMK	4 – 3	Bunyodkor	Olmaliq
UZT (UTC+5)	B.Yuldashev 7' (yellow card) 70'; M.Kasimov 20'; S.Rahmonov (yellow card) 48'; Z.Polvonov 55'; A.Shikhov 75'	Report	S.Rixsiboev 27'; Giyosov 71' (pen.); M.Mirakhmadov 72'	Stadium: AGMK Stadium; Attendance: 1,015; Referee: Shavkat Nasibullayev

== Squad statistics ==
As of match played 30 November 2019

=== Appearances and goals ===
No.	Pos	Nat	Player	Total		Uzbek Super League		Uzbek Cup		League Cup	
No.	Pos	Nat	Player	Apps	Goals	Apps	Goals	Apps	Goals	Apps	Goals
1	GK	(Uzbekistan) UZB	Abdumavlon Abdujalilov	18	0	13+1	0	3	0	1	0
2	DF	(Uzbekistan) UZB	Kemran Najafaliev	2	0	0	0	0	0	2	0
3	DF	(Uzbekistan) UZB	Islom Kobilov	24	2	21	2	3	0	0	0
5	DF	(Uzbekistan) UZB	Bobur Farhodov	15	0	1+8	0	0+3	0	3	0
6	DF	(Uzbekistan) UZB	Anvar Gafurov	28	0	23	0	4	0	1	0
7	MF	(Uzbekistan) UZB	Dilshodbek Axmadaliev	31	1	24	0	4	1	1+2	0
8	MF	(Uzbekistan) UZB	Jasurbek Jaloliddinov	22	3	14+6	2	1	0	1	1
10	MF	(Uzbekistan) UZB	Khursid Giyosov	30	14	25	12	4	1	1	1
11	DF	(Uzbekistan) UZB	Javohir Kakhramanov	30	2	17+8	2	1+2	0	1+1	0
13	MF	(Uzbekistan) UZB	Lutfulla Turaev	27	1	21	1	4	0	2	0
17	MF	(Uzbekistan) UZB	Sanjar Kodirkulov	32	3	25+1	2	4	1	1+1	0
18	FW	(Uzbekistan) UZB	Vladislav Nuriev	13	2	0+9	0	0+1	1	3	1
19	MF	(Uzbekistan) UZB	Nurillo Tukhtasinov	29	7	22+2	6	4	1	0+1	0
23	FW	(Uzbekistan) UZB	Sanjar Rixsiboev	9	1	2+5	0	0	0	2	1
25	GK	(Uzbekistan) UZB	Murod Zukhurov	16	0	13	0	1+1	0	1	0
26	DF	(Uzbekistan) UZB	Ulugbek Abdullayev	11	0	6+2	0	1	0	2	0
30	MF	(Uzbekistan) UZB	Abdulla Abdullayev	23	1	13+5	1	3	0	2	0
34	MF	(Uzbekistan) UZB	Sukhrob Izzatov	16	1	3+9	0	0+1	0	3	1
37	DF	(Uzbekistan) UZB	Mukhammadodil Kakhramonov	4	0	0	0	0+1	0	3	0
39	FW	(Uzbekistan) UZB	Mirjakhon Mirakhmadov	30	9	24+1	7	4	1	0+1	1
48	MF	(Uzbekistan) UZB	Valeriy Akopov	2	0	0	0	0	0	1+1	0
49	MF	(Uzbekistan) UZB	Farrukh Ikramov	3	0	1+1	0	0	0	0+1	0
74	GK	(Uzbekistan) UZB	Eldor Adhamov	1	0	0	0	0	0	1	0
	DF	(Uzbekistan) UZB	Sanzhar Tursunov	11	1	3+6	1	1+1	0	0	0
	MF	(Ukraine) UKR	Yevhen Chumak	4	1	3	0	1	1	0	0
	MF	(Uzbekistan) UZB	Shohrux Gadoyev	13	2	9+1	1	0+3	1	0	0
	FW	(Russia) RUS	Dmitri Ostrovski	4	0	1+3	0	0	0	0	0
Players away on loan:
9	MF	(Uzbekistan) UZB	Sardorbek Azimov	3	0	0+2	0	0	0	0+1	0
Players who left Bunyodkor during the season:
4	MF	(Uzbekistan) UZB	Sergey Prokhorov	3	0	2	0	0	0	1	0
27	DF	(Uzbekistan) UZB	Abubakir Muydinov	1	0	0+1	0	0	0	0	0

=== Goal scorers ===
Place	Position	Nation	Number	Name	Uzbek Super League	Uzbekistan Cup	League Cup	Total
1	MF	(Uzbekistan)	10	Khursid Giyosov	12	1	1	14
2	FW	(Uzbekistan)	39	Mirjakhon Mirakhmadov	7	1	1	9
3	MF	(Uzbekistan)	19	Nurillo Tukhtasinov	6	1	0	7
4	MF	(Uzbekistan)	17	Sanjar Kodirkulov	2	1	0	3
4	MF	(Uzbekistan)	8	Jasurbek Jaloliddinov	2	0	1	3
6	DF	(Uzbekistan)	11	Javohir Kakhramanov	2	0	0	2
6	DF	(Uzbekistan)	3	Islom Kobilov	2	0	0	2
6	FW	(Uzbekistan)	18	Vladislav Nuriev	1	0	1	2
6	MF	(Uzbekistan)		Shohrux Gadoyev	1	1	0	2
9	MF	(Uzbekistan)	13	Lutfulla Turaev	1	0	0	1
9	MF	(Uzbekistan)	7	Dilshodbek Axmadaliev	1	0	0	1
9	MF	(Ukraine)		Yevhen Chumak	1	0	0	1
9	DF	(Uzbekistan)		Sanzhar Tursunov	1	0	0	1
9	MF	(Uzbekistan)	30	Abdulla Abdullayev	1	0	0	1
9	MF	(Uzbekistan)	34	Sukhrob Izzatov	0	0	1	1
9	FW	(Uzbekistan)	23	Sanjar Rixsiboev	0	0	1	1
				TOTALS	37	8	6	51

=== Disciplinary record ===
Number	Nation	Position	Name	Uzbek Super League		Uzbekistan Cup		League Cup		Total	
Number	Nation	Position	Name	Booked	Sent off (straight red)	Booked	Sent off (straight red)	Booked	Sent off (straight red)	Booked	Sent off (straight red)
1	(Uzbekistan)	GK	Abdumavlon Abdujalilov	2	0	0	0	0	0	2	0
3	(Uzbekistan)	DF	Islom Kobilov	7	0	0	0	0	0	7	0
5	(Uzbekistan)	DF	Bobur Farhodov	1	0	0	0	0	0	1	0
6	(Uzbekistan)	DF	Anvar Gafurov	3	0	0	0	0	0	3	0
7	(Uzbekistan)	MF	Dilshodbek Axmadaliev	1	0	0	0	0	0	1	0
8	(Uzbekistan)	MF	Jasurbek Jaloliddinov	0	0	0	0	1	0	1	0
10	(Uzbekistan)	MF	Khursid Giyosov	5	0	0	0	0	0	5	0
11	(Uzbekistan)	MF	Javohir Kakhramanov	2	0	0	0	0	0	2	0
13	(Uzbekistan)	MF	Lutfulla Turaev	7	0	2	1	0	0	9	1
17	(Uzbekistan)	MF	Sanjar Kodirkulov	4	0	1	0	0	0	5	0
19	(Uzbekistan)	MF	Nurillo Tukhtasinov	6	0	3	1	0	0	9	1
30	(Uzbekistan)	MF	Abdulla Abdullayev	3	1	0	0	0	0	3	1
34	(Uzbekistan)	MF	Sukhrob Izzatov	4	0	0	0	1	0	5	0
37	(Uzbekistan)	DF	Mukhammadodil Kakhramonov	0	0	0	0	1	0	1	0
39	(Uzbekistan)	FW	Mirjakhon Mirakhmadov	3	0	0	0	0	0	3	0
	(Uzbekistan)	DF	Sanzhar Tursunov	0	0	2	0	0	0	2	0
	(Ukraine)	MF	Yevhen Chumak	1	0	0	0	0	0	1	0
	(Uzbekistan)	MF	Shohrux Gadoyev	1	0	1	0	0	0	2	0
	(Russia)	FW	Dmitri Ostrovski	1	0	0	0	0	0	1	0
Players who left Bunyodkor during the season:
4	(Uzbekistan)	MF	Sergey Prokhorov	1	0	0	0	0	0	1	0
			TOTALS	49	1	9	2	3	0	61	3
