= 2018 FC Bunyodkor season =

FC Bunyodkor
2018 season
- Chairman: Bedil Alimov
- Manager: Mirjalol Qosimov
- Uzbek League: 4th
- Uzbekistan Cup: Semifinal vs AGMK
- Top goalscorer: League: Jovlon Ibrokhimov (11); All: Jovlon Ibrokhimov (11)
Home colours	Away colours

The 2018 season is Bunyodkor's 12th season in the Uzbek League.

== Squad ==
As of 22 July 2018

Note: Flags indicate national team as defined under FIFA eligibility rules; some limited exceptions apply. Players may hold more than one non-FIFA nationality.

No.	Pos.	Nation	Player
2	DF	UZB	Rustam Ashurmatov
3	DF	UZB	Islom Kobilov
4	DF	UZB	Akramjon Komilov
5	DF	UZB	Dilshod Juraev
6	DF	UZB	Anvar Gafurov
8	MF	UZB	Jovlon Ibrokhimov
9	FW	UZB	Shahzodbek Nurmatov
10	MF	UZB	Abdulla Abdullayev
11	MF	UZB	Murod Toshmatov
13	MF	UZB	Sanjar Kodirkulov
18	MF	UZB	Sardor Sabirkhodjaev
20	MF	UZB	Mirgiyos Suleymanov
21	MF	UZB	Rasul Yuldashev

No.	Pos.	Nation	Player
25	GK	UZB	Murod Zukhurov
28	DF	UZB	Davronbek Umirov
30	MF	UZB	Khursid Giyosov
32	GK	UZB	Suhrobjon Sultonov
35	GK	UZB	Abdukarim Mukhammedov
44	MF	UZB	Mirjamol Kosimov
50	MF	UZB	Farrukh Ikramov
54	FW	UZB	Mirjakhon Mirakhmadov
59	MF	UZB	Sukhrob Izzatov
62	FW	UZB	Jakhongirbek Abdusalomov
99	FW	SRB	Filip Rajevac
—	MF	UZB	Dilshodbek Axmadaliev
—	MF	UZB	Azizbek Haydarov

== Transfers ==
=== Winter ===
In: Note: Flags indicate national team as defined under FIFA eligibility rules; some limited exceptions apply. Players may hold more than one non-FIFA nationality.

No.	Pos.	Nation	Player
11	MF	UZB	Murod Toshmatov (from (Uzbekistan) Metallurg Bekabad)
13	MF	UZB	Sanjar Kodirkulov (loan return from (Uzbekistan) Metallurg Bekabad)
20	MF	UZB	Mirgiyos Suleymanov (from (Uzbekistan) Metallurg Bekabad)
99	FW	SRB	Filip Rajevac (from (Uzbekistan) Kokand 1912)

Out: Note: Flags indicate national team as defined under FIFA eligibility rules; some limited exceptions apply. Players may hold more than one non-FIFA nationality.

No.	Pos.	Nation	Player
11	FW	MDA	Vadim Cemîrtan (to (Uzbekistan) AGMK)
14	MF	UZB	Vokhid Shodiev
16	MF	UZB	Alisher Sanayev (to (Uzbekistan) Qizilqum Zarafshon)
17	MF	UZB	Dostonbek Khamdamov (to (Russia) Anzhi Makhachkala)
19	MF	UZB	Nurillo Tukhtasinov (to (Uzbekistan) Sogdiana Jizzakh)
20	MF	UZB	Sardorbek Azimov (to (Uzbekistan) Sogdiana Jizzakh, previously on loan to (Uzbekistan) Navbahor Namangan)
21	MF	UZB	Dilshodbek Axmadaliev
22	MF	UZB	Shohrux Gadoyev (to (South Korea) Daejeon Citizen)
29	DF	UZB	Otabek Shukurov (to (United Arab Emirates) Sharjah)
45	GK	UZB	Dilshod Khamraev (to (Uzbekistan) Sogdiana Jizzakh, previously on loan to (Uzbekistan) Navbahor Namangan)
77	MF	UZB	Shokhruz Norhonov (to (Uzbekistan) Sogdiana Jizzakh)

=== Summer ===
In: Note: Flags indicate national team as defined under FIFA eligibility rules; some limited exceptions apply. Players may hold more than one non-FIFA nationality.

No.	Pos.	Nation	Player
5	DF	UZB	Dilshod Juraev (from (Uzbekistan) AGMK)
—	MF	UZB	Dilshodbek Axmadaliev
—	MF	UZB	Azizbek Haydarov (from (United Arab Emirates) Ajman)

Out: Note: Flags indicate national team as defined under FIFA eligibility rules; some limited exceptions apply. Players may hold more than one non-FIFA nationality.

No.	Pos.	Nation	Player

== Competitions ==
=== Uzbek League ===
==== Regular season ====
===== League table =====
Pos	Team	Pld	W	D	L	GF	GA	GD	Pts	Qualification or relegation
1	Pakhtakor	22	14	5	3	36	12	+24	47	Qualification to Championship Round
2	Lokomotiv	22	11	7	4	35	21	+14	40	Qualification to Championship Round
3	Bunyodkor	22	12	4	6	35	26	+9	40	Qualification to Championship Round
4	Navbahor	22	11	4	7	29	18	+11	37	Qualification to Championship Round
5	Metallurg	22	9	6	7	24	29	−5	33	Qualification to Championship Round
6	Bukhoro	22	10	2	10	23	28	−5	32	Qualification to Championship Round
7	Kokand 1912	22	7	7	8	21	20	+1	28	Relegation Round
8	AGMK	22	7	5	10	26	28	−2	26	Relegation Round
9	Nasaf	22	6	8	8	21	28	−7	26	Relegation Round
10	Qizilqum	22	7	2	13	20	29	−9	23	Relegation Round
11	Sogdiana	22	4	5	13	17	32	−15	17	Relegation Round
12	Neftchi	22	2	9	11	12	28	−16	15	Relegation Round

Source: Uzbekistan Professional Football League
Rules for classification: 1) points; 2) goal difference; 3) number of goals scored

===== Results summary =====
Overall								Home						Away					
Pld	W	D	L	GF	GA	GD	Pts	W	D	L	GF	GA	GD	W	D	L	GF	GA	GD
22	12	4	6	35	27	+8	40	7	2	2	20	13	+7	5	2	4	15	14	+1

Last updated: 17 August 2018.
Source: See Results

===== Results by round =====
Round	1	2	3	4	5	6	7	8	9	10	11	12	13	14	15	16	17	18	19	20	21	22
Ground	H	H	A	H	A	H	A	H	A	H	A	A	A	A	H	H	A	H	A	H	A	H
Result	D	W	W	W	W	W	L	L	L	W	W	W	L	D	W	W	D	W	L	L	W	D
Position	4	3	3	1	1	1	1	3	3	2	2	2	2	2	2	2	2	2	2	3	2	3

Source: See Results
A = Away; H = Home; W = Win; D = Draw; L = Loss

===== Results =====
3 March 2018 1	Bunyodkor	1 – 1	AGMK	Tashkent
20:00 UZT (UTC+5)	Ibrokhimov (yellow card) 30'; D.Umirov 88'	Report	Đokić 39' (pen.); M.Muzaffarov (yellow card) 63'	Stadium: Milliy Stadium; Attendance: 12,475; Referee: Zokir Kadyrov

10 March 2018 2	Bunyodkor	1 – 0	Pakhtakor Tashkent	Tashkent
18:00 UZT (UTC+5)	Ashurmatov 79' (yellow card) 90+3'; Ibrokhimov (yellow card) 90+3'	Report		Stadium: Milliy Stadium; Attendance: 20,186; Referee: Sherzod Kasymov

17 March 2018 3	Neftchi Fargʻona	0 – 1	Bunyodkor	Fergana
18:00 UZT (UTC+5)	X.Gofurov (yellow card) 30'; D.Tursunov (yellow card) 70'; A.Abdulkhakov (yellow card) 88'	Report	Giyosov 53'; D.Umirov (yellow card) 60'; Nurmatov (yellow card) 85'	Stadium: Istiqlol Stadium; Attendance: 18,051; Referee: Ilgiz Tantashev

30 March 2018 4	Bunyodkor	3 – 1	Buxoro	Tashkent
18:00 UZT (UTC+5)	Komilov (yellow card) 39'; Ibrokhimov 44'; Sabirkhodjaev (yellow card) 59'; Giyosov 72' (yellow card) 80'; Rajevac 90+2'	Report	N.Umurov (yellow card) 5'; A.Filiposyan (yellow card) 28'; Klisura 37'	Stadium: Milliy Stadium; Attendance: 15,421; Referee: Ravshan Irmatov

5 April 2018 5	Qizilqum Zarafshon	0 – 1	Bunyodkor	Navoiy
20:00 UZT (UTC+5)	S.Djuraev (yellow card) 40'	Report	M.Suleymanov (yellow card) 23'; M.Kosimov (yellow card) 49'; Ibrokhimov 84' (yellow card) 90+2'	Stadium: Yoshlar Stadium; Attendance: 11,253; Referee: Viktor Serazetdinov

11 April 2018 6	Bunyodkor	3 – 1	Metallurg Bekabad	Tashkent
18:00 UZT (UTC+5)	Nurmatov 56'; Sabirkhodjaev 67'; Ibrokhimov (yellow card) 85'	Report	M.Isayev (yellow card) 39'; S.Shaymanov 82' (pen.)	Stadium: Milliy Stadium; Attendance: 11,980; Referee: Olim Tuychibaev

20 April 2018 7	Navbahor Namangan	2 – 1	Bunyodkor	Namangan
19:00 UZT (UTC+5)	O.O'runov (yellow card) 48'; Injac 58' (yellow card) 59'; M.Gofurov (yellow card) 63'; D.Mekhmonov (yellow card) 79' (goal) 90+4'	Report	Ashurmatov 13' Komilov (yellow card) 33'; M.Suleymanov (yellow card) 70'; Gafurov (yellow card) 90+4'; Rajevac (yellow card) 90+4'	Stadium: Markaziy Stadium; Attendance: 21,600; Referee: Ravshan Irmatov

26 April 2018 8	Bunyodkor	1 – 2	Lokomotiv Tashkent	Tashkent
20:30 UZT (UTC+5)	Sabirkhodjaev (yellow card) 56'; M.Toshmatov 60'; Ashurmatov (yellow card) 71'; Ibrokhimov (yellow card) 84'; D.Umirov (yellow card) 90'	Report	Bikmaev 72' (pen.), 86' (pen.)	Stadium: Milliy Stadium; Attendance: 19,492; Referee: Akhrol Riskullaev

30 April 2018 9	Kokand 1912	1 – 0	Bunyodkor	Kokand
18:00 UZT (UTC+5)	Otakuziev 80'	Report	Rajevac (yellow card) 34'; Kobilov (yellow card) 61'	Stadium: Kokand Markaziy Stadium; Attendance: 11,072; Referee: Ilgiz Tantashev

4 May 2018 10	Bunyodkor	2 – 1	Nasaf	Tashkent
18:00 UZT (UTC+5)	Ibrokhimov 57'; Giyosov 69'; M.Toshmatov (yellow card) 90+1'	Report	S.Temirov 90+2'	Stadium: Milliy Stadium; Attendance: 23,682; Referee: Ravshan Irmatov

12 May 2018 11	Sogdiana Jizzakh	1 – 2	Bunyodkor	Jizzakh
18:30 UZT (UTC+5)	D.Karimov 57'; S.Qulmatov (yellow card) 65'; Melziddinov (yellow card) 80'	Report	Ibrokhimov 39'; Komilov (yellow card) 52'; Giyosov (yellow card) 62'; Ashurmatov (yellow card) 73'; M.Suleymanov (yellow card) 83'; Rajevac 85'	Stadium: Sogdiana Stadium; Attendance: 9,311; Referee: Zokir Kadyrov

15 May 2018 12	AGMK	1 – 2	Bunyodkor	Olmaliq
18:00 UZT (UTC+5)	Turaev (yellow card) 43'; Z.Polvonov 63'; A.Khojiakbarov (yellow card) 90+2'	Report	Rajevac 14', 34'; M.Kosimov (yellow card) 62'	Stadium: AGMK Stadium; Attendance: 8,768; Referee: Olim Tuychibaev

25 May 2018 13	Pakhtakor Tashkent	1 – 0	Bunyodkor	Tashkent
18:00 UZT (UTC+5)	Tiago Bezerra 6'	Report	Gafurov (yellow card) 35'; Komilov (yellow card) 38'; Ibrokhimov (yellow card) 42'	Stadium: Pakhtakor Markaziy Stadium; Attendance: 23,456; Referee: Sherzod Kasymov

3 June 2018 14	Bunyodkor	–	Neftchi Fargʻona	Tashkent
UZT (UTC+5)				Stadium: Milliy Stadium

12 June 2018 15	Buxoro	2 – 2	Bunyodkor	Bukhara
19:32 UZT (UTC+5)	Nasimov 37' (yellow card) 75'; Ibragimov (yellow card) 54' (goal) 58' (pen.); M.Jumaev (yellow card) 83'; Filiposyan (yellow card) 85'	Report	Nurmatov 32', 69'; Kobilov (yellow card) 57'; S.Sultonov (yellow card) 75'; Rajevac (yellow card) 90'	Stadium: Buxoro Arena; Attendance: 18,891; Referee: Timur Tukhtasinov

9 July 2018 16	Bunyodkor	2 – 0	Qizilqum Zarafshon	Tashkent
21:00 UZT (UTC+5)	Ibrokhimov 7' (pen.); Ashurmatov (yellow card) 51'; Rajevac (yellow card) 80' (goal) 83'; M.Kosimov (yellow card) 89'	Report	F.Kambarov (yellow card) 24'; A.Sanaev (yellow card) 74'	Stadium: Milliy Stadium; Attendance: 1,286; Referee: Sherzod Kasymov

12 July 2018 14	Bunyodkor	2 – 1	Neftchi Fargʻona	Tashkent
20:00 UZT (UTC+5)	Ibrokhimov (yellow card) 12' (goal) 66', 69'; Kobilov (yellow card) 45+1' (yellow-red card) 71'	Report	J.Kimsanov (yellow card) 36'; S.Khakimov 42'; M.Bobojonov (yellow card) 45+1'; D.Tusunov (yellow card) 77'	Stadium: Milliy Stadium; Attendance: 1,064; Referee: Valentin Kovalenko

19 July 2018 17	Metallurg Bekabad	1 – 1	Bunyodkor	Bekabad
19:00 UZT (UTC+5)	Z.Abdullayev (yellow card) 45+2'; S.Shaymanov 50'; Pardaev (yellow card) 82'	Report	M.Toshmatov 34'; D.Axmadaliev (yellow card) 74'	Stadium: Metallurg Bekabad Stadium; Attendance: 7,241; Referee: Vladislav Tseytlin

24 July 2018 18	Bunyodkor	2 – 1	Navbahor Namangan	Tashkent
21:00 UZT (UTC+5)	D.Axmadaliev 37'; Rajevac 58'; Sabirkhodjaev (yellow card) 73'	Report	R.Ahmedov 31'	Stadium: Milliy Stadium; Attendance: 9,741; Referee: Vadim Agishev

29 July 2018 19	Lokomotiv Tashkent	3 – 1	Bunyodkor	Tashkent
21:00 UZT (UTC+5)	Abdullaev (yellow card) 38'; Mirzaev 45+1'; Ismailov 71'; Rashidov 90+1'	Report	M.Suleymanov (yellow card) 22'; Giyosov 33'; Ashurmatov (yellow card) 83'	Stadium: Lokomotiv Stadium; Attendance: 5,722; Referee: Sherzod Kasymov

2 August 2018 20	Bunyodkor	1 – 3	Kokand 1912	Tashkent
21:00 UZT (UTC+5)	Komilov (yellow card) 42' (yellow-red card) 43'; Giyosov (yellow card) 51'; Ibrokhimov 64' (pen.) (yellow card) 90+3'; Haydarov (yellow card) 90+4'	Report	J.Khakimov 14'; G.Komilov 28'; Sidikov 73'; B.Sadullaev (yellow card) 83'	Stadium: Milliy Stadium; Attendance: 3,174; Referee: Timur Tukhtasinov

11 August 2018 21	Nasaf	1 – 4	Bunyodkor	Qarshi
20:00 UZT (UTC+5)	Karimov (yellow card) 61' (yellow-red card) 64'; Davlatov 90+3'	Report	Nurmatov 27', 81'; M.Kosimov (yellow card) 53'; Juraev 65'; Ibrokhimov 85'; M.Suleymanov (yellow card) 90+3'	Stadium: Markaziy Stadium; Attendance: 3,146; Referee: Zokir Kadyrov

17 August 2018 22	Bunyodkor	2 – 2	Sogdiana Jizzakh	Tashkent
20:30 UZT (UTC+5)	Gafurov 61' (yellow card) 69'; M.Mirakhmadov 72'	Report	Melziddinov 33' (yellow card) 37'; S.Djurabekov (yellow card) 51'; S.Rashidov 57'	Stadium: Milliy Stadium; Attendance: 527; Referee: Viktor Serazetdinov

==== Championship Round ====
===== League table =====
Pos	Team	Pld	W	D	L	GF	GA	GD	Pts	Qualification or relegation
1	Lokomotiv (C)	20	14	4	2	37	17	+20	46	Qualification to the 2019 AFC Champions League group stage
2	Pakhtakor	20	11	4	5	38	17	+21	37	Qualification to the 2019 AFC Champions League preliminary round 2
3	Navbahor	20	9	4	7	20	18	+2	31	
4	Bunyodkor	20	8	3	9	26	26	0	27	
5	Metallurg	20	5	4	11	12	28	−16	19	
6	Bukhoro	20	3	1	16	14	41	−27	10	

Source: Uzbekistan Professional Football League
Rules for classification: 1) points; 2) goal difference; 3) number of goals scored
(C) Champions

===== Results summary =====
Overall								Home						Away					
Pld	W	D	L	GF	GA	GD	Pts	W	D	L	GF	GA	GD	W	D	L	GF	GA	GD
10	4	1	5	11	12	−1	13	3	1	1	8	4	+4	1	0	4	3	8	−5

Last updated: 30 November 2018.
Source: See Results

===== Results by round =====
Round	1	2	3	4	5	6	7	8	9	10
Ground	H	A	H	A	H	A	H	A	H	A
Result	W	L	W	L	L	W	D	L	W	L
Position	4	4	4	4	4	4	4	4	4	4

Source: See Results
A = Away; H = Home; W = Win; D = Draw; L = Loss

===== Results =====
15 September 2018 23	Bunyodkor	3 – 0	Buxoro	Tashkent
20:00 UZT (UTC+5)	M.Toshmatov 19'; Nurmatov 39'; Ibrokhimov 51'; Rajevac (yellow card) 90'	Report	Ibragimov (yellow card) 40'; Mullajanov (yellow card) 70'	Stadium: Milliy Stadium; Attendance: 4,250; Referee: Timur Tukhtasinov

23 September 2018 24	Lokomotiv Tashkent	2 – 1	Bunyodkor	Tashkent
18:00 UZT (UTC+5)	Abdukholiqov 3'; Gafurov 49'	Report	K.Giyosov 35'	Stadium: Lokomotiv Stadium; Attendance: 3,825; Referee: Ravshan Irmatov

3 October 2018 25	Bunyodkor	2 – 0	Navbahor Namangan	Tashkent
20:00 UZT (UTC+5)	Haydarov 31'; A.Abdullayev 60'; Sabirkhodjaev (yellow card) 73'	Report	Khashimov (yellow card) 85'	Stadium: Milliy Stadium; Attendance: 5,482; Referee: Viktor Serazetdinov

20 October 2018 26	Metallurg Bekabad	1 – 0	Bunyodkor	Bekabad
16:00 UZT (UTC+5)	M.Isayev (yellow card) 28'; Andreev (yellow card) 61'; I.Isakjanov (yellow card) 64'; Z.Abdullayev (yellow card) 89'; S.Shaymanov 90+4'	Report	Nurmatov (yellow card) 76'; Ibrokhimov (yellow card) 89'; Giyosov (yellow card) 90+4'	Stadium: Metallurg Bekabad Stadium; Attendance: 4,211; Referee: Vladislav Tseytlin

24 October 2018 27	Bunyodkor	0 – 2	Pakhtakor Tashkent	Tashkent
18:00 UZT (UTC+5)	Ashurmatov (yellow card) 51'	Report	Tiago (yellow card) 22' (goal) 36'; Iskanderov 81'	Stadium: Milliy Stadium; Attendance: 4,288; Referee: Khasan Ruziev

1 November 2018 28	Buxoro	0 – 2	Bunyodkor	Bukhara
18:00 UZT (UTC+5)	R.Khasanov (yellow card) 42'; S.Kutybaev (yellow card) 60' (yellow-red card) 79'; Filiposyan (yellow card) 90+4'	Report	Haydarov (yellow card) 30'; Juraev (yellow card) 56'; Rajevac 90'; M.Mirakhmadov 90+2'	Stadium: Buxoro Arena; Attendance: 11,307

5 November 2018 29	Bunyodkor	2 – 2	Lokomotiv Tashkent	Tashkent
17:00 UZT (UTC+5)	Haydarov 41'; Sabirkhodjaev 67'	Report	Bikmaev 39'; Tukhtakhodjaev (yellow card) 64'; F.Farrukhjon (yellow card) 64'; Zoteev 81'; A.Ismailov (yellow card) 90+1'	Stadium: Milliy Stadium; Attendance: 3,761; Referee: Zokir Kadyrov

10 November 2018 30	Navbahor Namangan	1 – 0	Bunyodkor	Namangan
18:00 UZT (UTC+5)	R.Ahmedov (yellow card) 8' (goal) 64' (pen.); Khashimov (yellow card) 48'	Report	Haydarov (yellow card) 8'; Komilov (yellow card) 63'; Ibrokhimov (yellow card) 76' (yellow-red card) 90+3'	Stadium: Markaziy Stadium; Attendance: 12,050; Referee: Ilgiz Tantashev

24 November 2018 31	Bunyodkor	1 – 0	Metallurg Bekabad	Tashkent
14:00 UZT (UTC+5)	Haydarov 50' (pen.)	Report		Stadium: Milliy Stadium; Attendance: 1,184; Referee: Sherzod Kasymov

30 November 2018 32	Pakhtakor Tashkent	4 – 0	Bunyodkor	Tashkent
18:00 UZT (UTC+5)	Bezerra 5', 44', 83'; Sergeev 90+1'	Report	Juraev (yellow card) 33'	Stadium: Pakhtakor Markaziy Stadium; Attendance: 1,153; Referee: Vladislav Tseytlin

=== Uzbek Cup ===
29 May 2018 Last 16	Bunyodkor	1 – 0	Sogdiana Jizzakh	Tashkent
19:02 UZT (UTC+5)	M.Kosimov 10'; M.Toshmatov (yellow card) 70'	Report	T.Shamsiddinov (yellow card) 68'; S.Azimov (yellow card) 68'; S.Meliev (yellow card) 80'	Stadium: Milliy Stadium; Attendance: 5,043; Referee: Jasur Muxtarov

19 September 2018 Quarterfinal	Andijon	1 – 2	Bunyodkor	Andijan
18:00 UZT (UTC+5)	F.Bekmurodov (yellow card) 28'; D.Iskakov 40'; D.Mamatov (yellow card) 90+4'	Report	M.Kosimov 14'; Nurmatov 26'; M.Suleymanov (yellow card) 85'	Stadium: Soghlom Avlod Stadium; Attendance: 7,300; Referee: Shavkat Nasibullayev

28 September 2018 Semifinal	Bunyodkor	1 – 2	AGMK	Tashkent
18:30 UZT (UTC+5)	M.Toshmatov 80'	Report	Kilichev (yellow card) 27'; M.Muzaffarov 57'; Z.Polvonov 63'; A.Isroilov (yellow card) 90+4'	Stadium: Milliy Stadium; Attendance: 2,447; Referee: Aziz Asymov

== Squad statistics ==
As of match played 30 November 2018

=== Appearances and goals ===
No.	Pos	Nat	Player	Total		Uzbek Super League		Uzbek Cup	
No.	Pos	Nat	Player	Apps	Goals	Apps	Goals	Apps	Goals
2	DF	(Uzbekistan) UZB	Rustam Ashurmatov	32	2	29	2	3	0
3	DF	(Uzbekistan) UZB	Islom Kobilov	9	0	3+6	0	0	0
4	DF	(Uzbekistan) UZB	Akramjon Komilov	32	0	29	0	3	0
5	DF	(Uzbekistan) UZB	Dilshod Juraev	19	1	16+1	1	2	0
6	DF	(Uzbekistan) UZB	Anvar Gafurov	18	1	17	1	1	0
8	MF	(Uzbekistan) UZB	Jovlon Ibrokhimov	30	11	27	11	3	0
9	FW	(Uzbekistan) UZB	Shahzodbek Nurmatov	33	7	23+7	6	2+1	1
10	MF	(Uzbekistan) UZB	Abdulla Abdullayev	14	1	2+10	1	0+2	0
11	MF	(Uzbekistan) UZB	Murod Toshmatov	35	4	31+1	3	3	1
13	MF	(Uzbekistan) UZB	Sanjar Kodirkulov	15	0	6+7	0	0+2	0
18	MF	(Uzbekistan) UZB	Sardor Sabirkhodjaev	32	2	28+1	2	3	0
20	MF	(Uzbekistan) UZB	Mirgiyos Suleymanov	30	0	24+3	0	3	0
21	MF	(Uzbekistan) UZB	Rasul Yuldashev	3	0	0+3	0	0	0
25	GK	(Uzbekistan) UZB	Murod Zukhurov	15	0	14	0	1	0
28	DF	(Uzbekistan) UZB	Davronbek Umirov	15	1	1+13	1	0+1	0
30	MF	(Uzbekistan) UZB	Khursid Giyosov	30	5	25+2	5	3	0
32	GK	(Uzbekistan) UZB	Suhrobjon Sultonov	20	0	18	0	2	0
44	MF	(Uzbekistan) UZB	Mirjamol Kosimov	28	2	24+1	0	3	2
50	MF	(Uzbekistan) UZB	Farrukh Ikramov	7	0	0+5	0	0+2	0
54	FW	(Uzbekistan) UZB	Mirjakhon Mirakhmadov	13	2	1+10	2	0+2	0
62	FW	(Uzbekistan) UZB	Jakhongirbek Abdusalomov	2	0	0+2	0	0	0
99	FW	(Serbia) SRB	Filip Rajevac	30	7	10+17	7	1+2	0
	MF	(Uzbekistan) UZB	Dilshodbek Axmadaliev	18	1	14+2	1	0+2	0
	MF	(Uzbekistan) UZB	Azizbek Haydarov	12	3	10+2	3	0	0
	MF	(Uzbekistan) UZB	Jasurbek Jaloliddinov	1	0	0+1	0	0	0
Players who left Bunyodkor during the season:

=== Goal scorers ===
Place	Position	Nation	Number	Name	Uzbek Super League	Uzbekistan Cup	Total
1	MF	(Uzbekistan)	8	Jovlon Ibrokhimov	11	0	11
2	FW	(Serbia)	99	Filip Rajevac	7	0	7
2	FW	(Uzbekistan)	9	Shahzodbek Nurmatov	6	1	7
4	MF	(Uzbekistan)	30	Khursid Giyosov	5	0	5
5	MF	(Uzbekistan)	11	Murod Toshmatov	3	1	4
6	MF	(Uzbekistan)		Azizbek Haydarov	3	0	3
7	DF	(Uzbekistan)	2	Rustam Ashurmatov	2	0	2
7	FW	(Uzbekistan)	54	Mirjakhon Mirakhmadov	2	0	2
7	MF	(Uzbekistan)	18	Sardor Sabirkhodjaev	2	0	2
7	MF	(Uzbekistan)	44	Mirjamol Kosimov	0	2	2
11	DF	(Uzbekistan)	28	Davronbek Umirov	1	0	1
11	MF	(Uzbekistan)		Dilshodbek Axmadaliev	1	0	1
11	DF	(Uzbekistan)	5	Dilshod Juraev	1	0	1
11	DF	(Uzbekistan)	6	Anvar Gafurov	1	0	1
11	MF	(Uzbekistan)	10	Abdulla Abdullayev	1	0	1
				TOTALS	46	4	50

=== Disciplinary record ===
Number	Nation	Position	Name	Uzbek Super League		Uzbekistan Cup		Total	
Number	Nation	Position	Name	Yellow card	Red card	Yellow card	Red card	Yellow card	Red card
2	(Uzbekistan)	DF	Rustam Ashurmatov	6	0	0	0	6	0
3	(Uzbekistan)	DF	Islom Kobilov	4	1	0	0	4	1
4	(Uzbekistan)	DF	Akramjon Komilov	7	1	0	0	7	1
5	(Uzbekistan)	DF	Dilshod Juraev	2	0	0	0	2	0
6	(Uzbekistan)	DF	Anvar Gafurov	3	0	0	0	3	0
8	(Uzbekistan)	MF	Jovlon Ibrokhimov	10	1	0	0	10	1
9	(Uzbekistan)	FW	Shahzodbek Nurmatov	2	0	0	0	2	0
10	(Uzbekistan)	MF	Mirgiyos Suleymanov	5	0	1	0	6	0
11	(Uzbekistan)	MF	Murod Toshmatov	1	0	1	0	2	0
18	(Uzbekistan)	MF	Sardor Sabirkhodjaev	4	0	0	0	4	0
28	(Uzbekistan)	DF	Davronbek Umirov	2	0	0	0	2	0
30	(Uzbekistan)	MF	Khursid Giyosov	4	0	0	0	4	0
32	(Uzbekistan)	GK	Suhrobjon Sultonov	1	0	0	0	1	0
44	(Uzbekistan)	MF	Mirjamol Kosimov	4	0	0	0	4	0
99	(Serbia)	FW	Filip Rajevac	5	0	0	0	5	0
	(Uzbekistan)	MF	Dilshodbek Axmadaliev	1	0	0	0	1	0
	(Uzbekistan)	MF	Azizbek Haydarov	3	0	0	0	3	0
			TOTALS	64	3	2	0	66	3
