= Jasurbek Jaloliddinov =

Uzbek footballer (born 2002)

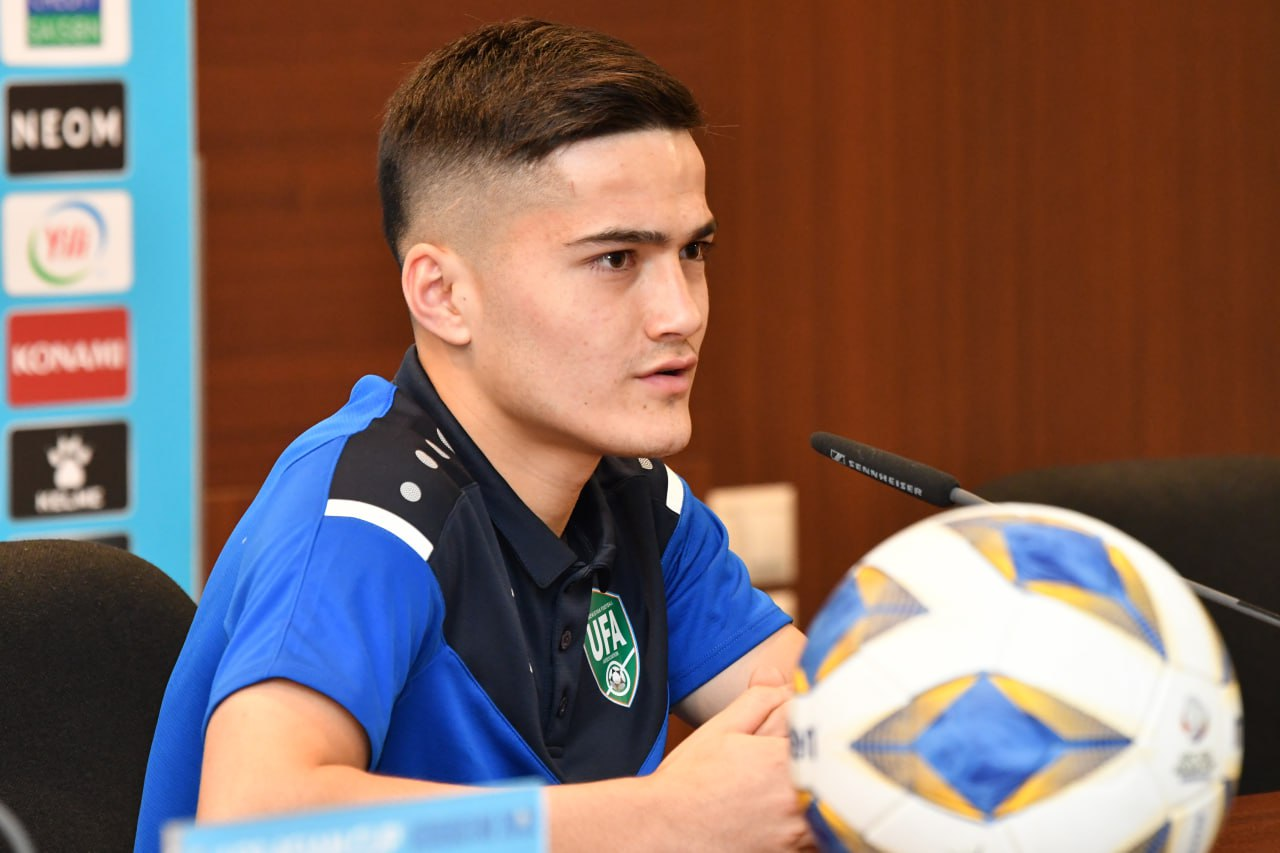

Personal information
- Full name: Jasurbek Jamshid oʻgʻli Jaloliddinov
- Date of birth: 15 May 2002 (age 24)
- Place of birth: Navoiy, Uzbekistan
- Height: 1.71 m (5 ft 7 in)
- Position: Midfielder

Team information
- Current team: Navbahor
- Number: 30

Senior career*
| Years | Team | Apps | (Gls) |
| 2018–2020 | Bunyodkor | 29 | (3) |
| 2020–2021 | Lokomotiv Moscow | 0 | (0) |
| 2020–2021 | → Tambov (loan) | 0 | (0) |
| 2021 | Andijon | 12 | (1) |
| 2021–2022 | Lokomotiv Tashkent | 22 | (1) |
| 2022 | → Kairat (loan) | 7 | (0) |
| 2023 | Olympic Tashkent | 21 | (5) |
| 2024 | Neftchi Fergana | 10 | (2) |
| 2024–2025 | Sumgayit | 15 | (0) |
| 2025–2026 | Sogdiana | 25 | (2) |
| 2026– | Navbahor | 1 | (0) |

International career^{‡}
| 2018–2020 | Uzbekistan U19 | 3 | (1) |
| 2019– | Uzbekistan U23 | 42 | (10) |
| 2020 | Uzbekistan | 1 | (0) |
Medal record
Representing Uzbekistan
Men's football
AFC U-23 Asian Cup
| Runner-up | 2022 Uzbekistan | Team |
| Runner-up | 2024 Qatar | Team |
Asian Games
| Bronze medal – third place | 2022 Hangzhou | Team |
- * Club domestic league appearances and goals as of 29 July 2026 ‡ National team caps and goals as of 24 July 2024

Jasurbek Jaloliddinov (born 15 May 2002) is an Uzbek professional footballer who plays as a midfielder for Uzbekistan Super League club Navbahor and the Uzbekistan national team. He was included in The Guardian's "Next Generation 2019".

== Club career ==
Pupil of the Bunyodkor football Academy. He made his debut in the main squad of Bunyodkor on August 2, 2018, in the match of the Uzbekistan Super League against Kokand 1912, becoming the youngest player in the history of the major league of the championship of Uzbekistan. At the time of his debut, he was 16 years and 80 days old. He played 32 matches for FC Bunyodkor, scored 3 goals and made 3 assists.

On 29 July 2020, Jaloliddinov signed a 5-year contract with Russian Premier League club Lokomotiv Moscow. On 13 October 2020, he was loaned to Tambov. On 25 January 2021, the loan was terminated early after he made just one substitute appearance for Tambov in a Russian Cup game, and he subsequently left Lokomotiv Moscow on 26 January 2021 by mutual consent.

=== Kairat (loan) ===
On 7 July 2022, Kairat confirmed that Jaloliddinov's loan had ended and that he'd returned to Lokomotiv Tashkent.

=== Sumgayit ===
On 25 October 2024, Sumgayit announced the signing of Jaloliddinov on a contract until the end of the season. Jaloliddinov made his debut as a substitute in a 1–0 home win over Sabah FK in the Azerbaijan Premier League on 3 November 2024.

=== Sogdiana ===
In July 2025, Jaloliddinov moved to Uzbek club FC Sogdiana. Wearing the number 70 jersey, he made his debut as a substitute on 4 July 2025 in the 2–1 victory over PFK Qoqon-1912.

== International career ==
Jaloliddinov debuted for the Uzbekistan national football team on 23 February 2020 at friendly match against Belarus.

== Career statistics ==
=== Club ===
As of match played 14 May 2022.

Appearances and goals by club, season and competition
| Club | Season | League | | | National Cup | | League Cup | | Continental | | Other | | Total | |
| Club | Season | Division | Apps | Goals | Apps | Goals | Apps | Goals | Apps | Goals | Apps | Goals | Apps | Goals |
|---|---|---|---|---|---|---|---|---|---|---|---|---|---|---|
| Bunyodkor | 2018 | Uzbekistan Super League | 1 | 0 | 0 | 0 | - | | - | | - | | 1 | 0 |
| Bunyodkor | 2019 | Uzbekistan Super League | 20 | 2 | 1 | 0 | 1 | 1 | - | | - | | 22 | 3 |
| Bunyodkor | 2020 | Uzbekistan Super League | 8 | 1 | 0 | 0 | - | | 2 (Note: Appearances in the AFC Champions League) | 0 | - | | 10 | 1 |
| Bunyodkor | Total | | 29 | 3 | 1 | 0 | 1 | 1 | 2 | 0 | 0 | 0 | 33 | 4 |
| Lokomotiv Moscow | 2020–21 | Russian Premier League | 0 | 0 | 0 | 0 | — | | 0 | 0 | 0 | 0 | 0 | 0 |
| Tambov (loan) | 2020–21 | Russian Premier League | 0 | 0 | 1 | 0 | — | | — | | — | | 1 | 0 |
| Andijon | 2021 | Uzbekistan Super League | 12 | 1 | 2 | 1 | — | | — | | — | | 14 | 2 |
| Lokomotiv Tashkent | 2021 | Uzbekistan Super League | 11 | 1 | 1 | 0 | — | | — | | — | | 12 | 1 |
| Lokomotiv Tashkent | 2022 | Uzbekistan Super League | 11 | 0 | 2 | 0 | — | | — | | 1 | 0 | 14 | 0 |
| Lokomotiv Tashkent | Total | | 22 | 1 | 3 | 0 | - | - | - | - | 1 | 0 | 26 | 1 |
| Kairat (loan) | 2022 | Kazakhstan Premier League | 7 | 0 | 0 | 0 | — | | 0 | 0 | 0 | 0 | 7 | 0 |
| Olympic Tashkent | 2023 | Uzbekistan Super League | 21 | 5 | 5 | 4 | — | | 0 | 0 | 0 | 0 | 26 | 9 |
| Neftchi Fergana | 2024 | Uzbekistan Super League | 10 | 2 | 0 | 0 | — | | 0 | 0 | 0 | 0 | 10 | 2 |
| Sumgayit | 2024–25 | Azerbaijan Premier League | 0 | 0 | 0 | 0 | — | | — | | — | | 0 | 0 |
| Career total | | | 101 | 12 | 12 | 5 | 1 | 1 | 2 | 0 | 1 | 0 | 117 | 18 |

=== International ===
As of match played 23 February 2020

Appearances and goals by national team and year
| National team | Year | Apps | Goals |
|---|---|---|---|
| Uzbekistan | 2020 | 1 | 0 |
| Total | | 1 | 0 |
