= Khurshid Giyosov =

Uzbekistani footballer

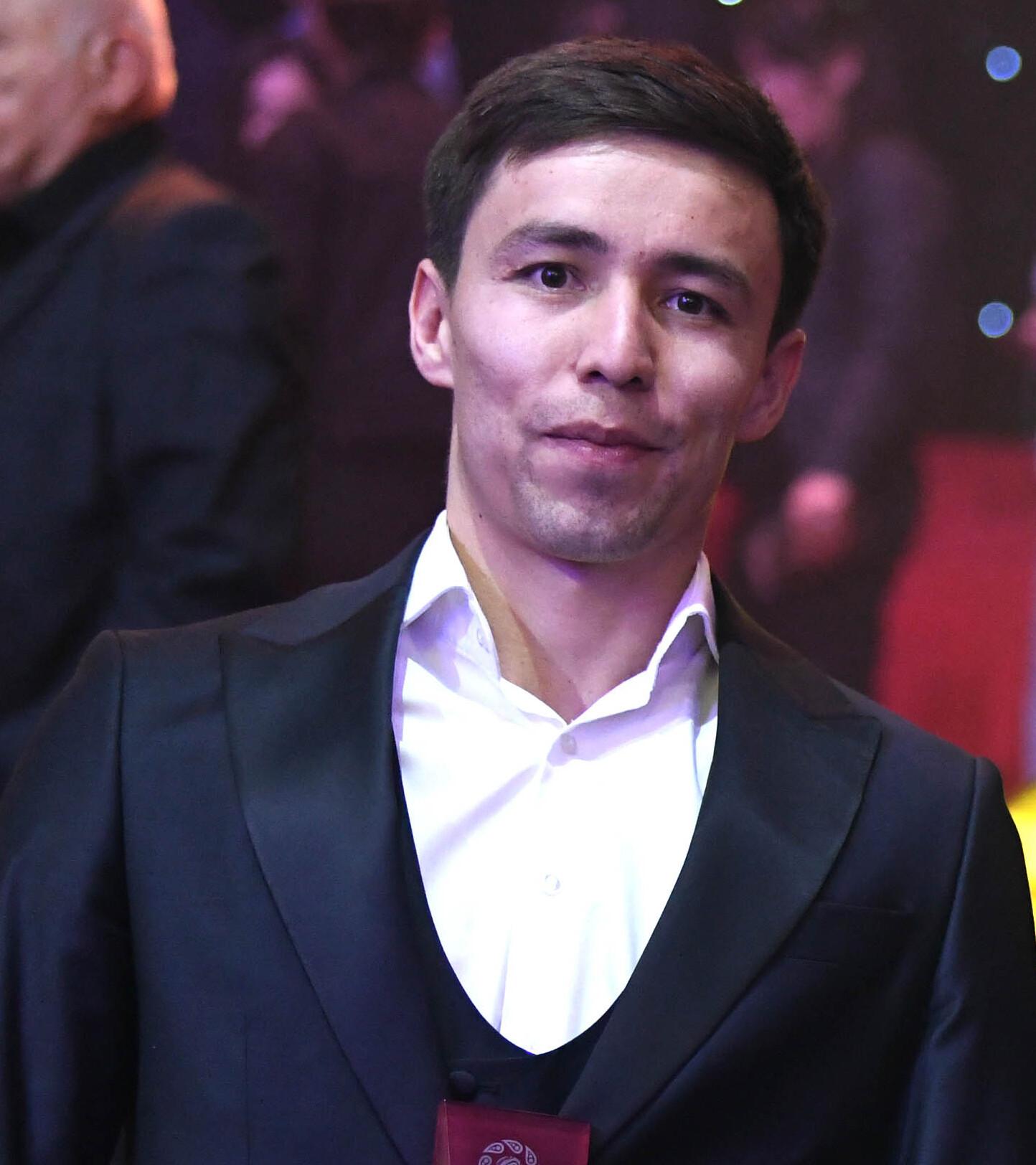

Personal information
- Full name: Khurshid Giyosov
- Date of birth: 13 April 1995 (age 31)
- Place of birth: Tashkent, Uzbekistan
- Height: 1.78 m (5 ft 10 in)
- Position: Midfielder

Team information
- Current team: Neftchi Fergana
- Number: 9

Senior career*
Years	Team	Apps	(Gls)
2014–2019	Bunyodkor	62	(17)
2016	→ Obod Tashkent (loan)	28	(0)
2020	Anyang	4	(1)
2020–2021	Bunyodkor	16	(8)
2022–2025	AGMK	108	(31)
2026–	Neftchi Fergana	14	(3)

International career^{‡}
2018–2019	Uzbekistan	5	(0)
- * Club domestic league appearances and goals as of 20:15, 28 July 2026 (UTC) ‡ National team caps and goals as of 12:11, 29 November 2019 (UTC)

Khurshid Giyosov (born 13 April 1995) is an Uzbekistani footballer who currently plays for Uzbekistan Super League clubs Neftchi Fergana and the Uzbekistan national football team.

== Career ==
=== Club ===
On 5 February 2020, Giyosov signed for K League 2 club FC Anyang.

== Career statistics ==
=== Club ===
As of match played 27 November 2019

Club	Season	League			National Cup		Continental		Other		Total	
Club	Season	Division	Apps	Goals	Apps	Goals	Apps	Goals	Apps	Goals	Apps	Goals
Bunyodkor	2014	Uzbek League	1	0	0	0	0 (Note: Appearances in the AFC Champions League)	0	0 (Note: Appearances in the Uzbekistan Super Cup)	0	1	0
Bunyodkor	2015	Uzbek League	0	0	1	0	0	0	-		1	0
Bunyodkor	2016	Uzbek League	0	0	0	0	0	0	-		0	0
Bunyodkor	2017	Uzbek League	10	0	0	0	4	0	-		14	0
Bunyodkor	2018	Uzbek League	27	5	3	0	-		-		30	5
Bunyodkor	2019	Uzbek League	24	12	4	1	-		1 (Note: Appearance and goal in the Uzbek League Cup)	1	29	14
Bunyodkor	Total		62	17	8	1	4	0	1	1	75	19
Obod Tashkent (loan)	2016	Uzbek League	28	0	1	0	–		–		29	0
Bunyodkor	2020	Uzbekistan Super League	16	8	1	0	0	0	–		17	8
Career total			106	25	10	1	4	0	1	1	121	27

=== International ===
Uzbekistan national team
Year	Apps	Goals
2018	2	0
2019	3	0
Total	5	0

Statistics accurate as of match played 9 November 2019
