= Murod Zukhurov =

Uzbekistani goalkeeper

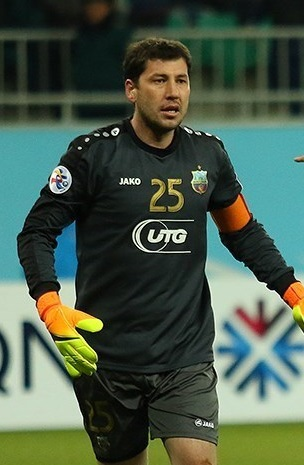

Personal information
- Full name: Murotjon Zukhurov
- Date of birth: 23 February 1983 (age 43)
- Place of birth: Bekabad, Uzbekistan
- Height: 1.88 m (6 ft 2 in)
- Position: Goalkeeper

Senior career*
Years	Team	Apps	(Gls)
2003–2006	Metalourg Bekabad	30	(0)
2007–2008	Navbahor Namangan	6	(0)
2008–2010	Bunyodkor	23	(0)
2010–2012	Nasaf Qarshi	36	(0)
2013–2019	Bunyodkor	110	(0)

International career
2002–2013	Uzbekistan	4	(0)
- * Club domestic league appearances and goals

Murod Zukhurov is an Uzbekistani retired goalkeeper. He was born on 23 February 1983 in Tashkent.

Zukhurov played for Bunyodkor in the 2009 AFC Champions League group stage.

== Career statistics ==
=== Club ===
As of match played 18 October 2019

Appearances and goals by club, season and competition
Club	Season	League			National Cup		League Cup		Continental		Other		Total	
Club	Season	Division	Apps	Goals	Apps	Goals	Apps	Goals	Apps	Goals	Apps	Goals	Apps	Goals
Bunyodkor	2013	Uzbekistan Super League	12	0	2	0	-		2	0	-		16	0
Bunyodkor	2014	Uzbekistan Super League	0	0	0	0	-		2	0	1	0	3	0
Bunyodkor	2015	Uzbekistan Super League	20	0	4	0	-		1	0	-		25	0
Bunyodkor	2016	Uzbekistan Super League	29	0	4	0	-		7	0	-		40	0
Bunyodkor	2017	Uzbekistan Super League	22	0	7	0	-		7	0	-		36	0
Bunyodkor	2018	Uzbekistan Super League	14	0	1	0	-		-		-		15	0
Bunyodkor	2019	Uzbekistan Super League	13	0	2	0	1	0	-		-		16	0
Bunyodkor	Total		110	0	20	0	1	0	19	0	1	0	151	0
Career total			110	0	20	0	1	0	19	0	1	0	151	0

=== International ===
Uzbekistan
Year	Apps	Goals
2012	2	0
2013	2	0
Total	4	0

Statistics accurate as of match played 10 September 2013
