= COVID-19 pandemic in Uzbekistan =

Aspect of viral disease pandemic

- Disease: COVID-19
- Pathogen: SARS-CoV-2
- Location: Uzbekistan
- First outbreak: Wuhan, Hubei, China (globally); France/United Kingdom/Turkey (locally); Paris, France (origin of first Uzbekistan case)
- Index case: Tashkent
- Arrival date: 15 March 2020 (6 years, 7 months, 1 week and 5 days)
- Confirmed cases: 250,273
- Recovered: 195,840
- Deaths: 1637

Government website
- coronavirus.uz/uz

The COVID-19 pandemic in Uzbekistan was a part of the worldwide pandemic of coronavirus disease 2019 (COVID-19) caused by severe acute respiratory syndrome coronavirus 2 (SARS-CoV-2). The virus was confirmed to have spread to Uzbekistan when its first case was confirmed on 15 March 2020, an Uzbek citizen returning from France.

== Background ==
On 12 January 2020, the World Health Organization (WHO) confirmed that a novel coronavirus was the cause of a respiratory illness in a cluster of people in Wuhan, Hubei, China, which was reported to the WHO on 31 December 2019.

The case fatality ratio for COVID-19 has been much lower than SARS of 2003, but the transmission has been significantly greater, with a significant total death toll.

== Timeline ==
=== February 2020 ===
On 28 February 2020, Uzbekistan Airways suspended flights to Medina and Jeddah.

=== March 2020 ===
On 13 March 2020, two days before the first case of coronavirus, Uzbekistan suspended flights to France, Spain, and the United Kingdom. Uzbekistan's Health Ministry published a list of people who were in contact with the deceased, with plans to quarantine them. After the case was announced, Kazakh President Kassym-Jomart Tokayev announced a state of emergency in Kazakhstan, and promptly closed the border with Uzbekistan.

On 15 March 2020, the first case of coronavirus infection was recorded, regarding an Uzbek citizen returning from France.

Since 16 March 2020, was introduced in Uzbekistan a ban on holding mass events with the participation of more than 10,000 people. Introduced in Uzbekistan Sports events ban on holding to 1 June 2020.

On 20 March 2020, the government announced that entertainment venues and tea houses would be closed and large weddings and other family gatherings would be prohibited.

On 22 March 2020, Uzbekistan ordered companies in Tashkent to do remote working, as well as making protective masks mandatory.

On 23 March 2020, the Uzbekistan government announced that a lockdown of Tashkent would start on the next day as an effort to contain the coronavirus.

Since 23 March in Tashkent, introduced wearing masks.

Since 24 March in all region centers Uzbekistan, wearing masks has been introduced.

On 27 March 2020, the first death was reported in the country, that of a 72-year-old woman who had underlying health conditions and had a heart attack. She appeared to have been infected by her daughter who had recently returned from Turkey.

On 28 March 2020, the second death was also confirmed. A doctor in Uzbekistan died after unsuccessfully trying to treat a coronavirus infection that he kept secret, the Central Asian nation's healthcare ministry said. The 39-year-old man had been in contact with Uzbek "patient zero", who appeared to have infected him. He was hospitalized on March 26 in grave condition and died two days later, becoming the second coronavirus patient to die in Uzbekistan.

=== April 2020 ===
On 1 April 2020, the numbers rose to 173.

Since 1 April, a self-isolation regime has been introduced, and for people over 65, it is forbidden to leave their homes.

On 2 April 2020, restrictions were set in place to freight.

On 3 April 2020, the number of confirmed cases rose to 223, with 25 recovered.

Since 6 April, self-isolation has become mandatory; people over 65 are prohibited from leaving their homes.

=== May 2020 ===
By 8 May 2020, restrictions were loosened the ban on holding public events was extended until 1 June.

The Uzbek authorities have imposed a ban on holding mass events on the Day of Remembrance and Honor on 9 May with the participation of more than 1 m people said the message about the Special Republican Commission.

On 24 May 2020, mass events were held on the Muslim holiday Eid al-Fitr for up to 500 thousand people, in compliance with quarantine requirements.

On 30 May 2020 according to the Special republican commission, The quarantine restrictions were extended until 15 June. Previously, there was a ban on holding public events until 1 June and will be extended to 17 June 2020.

=== June 2020 ===
The ban on sporting events has been lifted from 1 June 2020. The Uzbekistan Championship will resume on 5 June. This decision was made by the Special Republican Commission.

On 14 June 2020 according to the Special republican commission, The quarantine restrictions were extended until 1 August. Previously, there was a ban on holding public events until 17 June 2020, and will be extended to 1 August 2020.

From the middle of June, the daily increase in cases rose to 3-5%. On 14 June there were 5,040 recorded cases which increased to 8,503 by the end of the month.

=== July 2020 ===
By the end of July, 24,009 cases had been recorded with the daily increase still consistently above 3%. Quarantine restrictions have been extended until 15 August. Previously, there was a ban on holding public events until 1 August, and then the ban on holding public events was extended to 16 August.

=== August 2020 ===
On 15 August, some quarantine measures were relaxed, according to the Special republican commission combating coronavirus. After 15 August, the ban holding public events remained in force. The ban on holding mass events was extended to 6 September 2020. Since 15 August, the ban has been lifted on weddings and family events. These could be held with the participation of up to 30 people.

=== September 2020 ===
At the beginning of the month, the Special republican commission stated that cinemas, theatres and recreation parks can open on 5 September with some restrictions. Previously, there was a ban on holding public events until 6 September and will be extended to 30 September 2020. After 30 September 2020 was ban on holding public events will be extended to 1 November 2020 until quarantine measures are mitigated. The ban on holding public events and banquets will only be lifted the to last queue or after 1 January 2021.

By 10:00 3 September, the incidence of coronavirus increased to 42,635 people and the number of died increased to 331.

By 17:00 3 September the incidence of coronavirus increased to 42,688 people and number of people recovered from the coronavirus has increased to 40081 and the number of died increased to 333.

By 23:30 3 September the incidence of coronavirus increased to 42,797 people and number of people recovered from the coronavirus has increased to 40176 and the number of died increased to 334.

By 10:00 4 September, the incidence of coronavirus increased to 42,903 people and the number of died increased to 336.

By 17:00 4 September the incidence of coronavirus increased to 42,998 people and number of people recovered from the coronavirus has increased to 40392 and the number of died increased to 338.

By 23:30 4 September the incidence of coronavirus increased to 43075 people and number of people recovered from the coronavirus has increased to 40432 and the number of died increased to 339.

By 10:00 5 September, the incidence of coronavirus increased to 43169 people and the number of died increased to 341.

By 17:00 5 September the incidence of coronavirus increased to 43293 people and number of people recovered from the coronavirus has increased to 40774 and the number of died increased to 343.

By 23:30 5 September the incidence of coronavirus increased to 43370 people and number of people recovered from the coronavirus has increased to 40880.

By 10:00 6 September, the incidence of coronavirus increased to 43476 people and the number of died increased to 345.

By 18:00 6 September the incidence of coronavirus increased to 43587 people and number of people recovered from the coronavirus has increased to 41225 and the number of died increased to 347.

By 23:30 6 September the incidence of coronavirus increased to 43663 people and number of people recovered from the coronavirus has increased to 41277 and the number of died increased to 348.

After 5 September, the ban on holding mass events will be extended to 30 September.

Since 7 September, the schools will be open in green zones, schools will be open in all regions since 14 September. In schools, will be a ban was introduced on holding mass events concerts, etc. involving 700 people. Until 1 January 2021, mass events in schools will be banned due to the threat of coronavirus.

== See also ==
- COVID-19 pandemic in Asia
