= Sanjar Kodirkulov =

Uzbekistani footballer

Personal information
- Date of birth: 27 May 1997 (age 29)
- Place of birth: Tashkent, Uzbekistan
- Height: 1.75 m (5 ft 9 in)
- Position: Midfielder

Team information
- Current team: Dinamo Samarqand
- Number: 8

Senior career*
Years	Team	Apps	(Gls)
2016–2020	Bunyodkor	62	(3)
2017	→ Metallurg Bekabad (loan)	27	(1)
2021–2023	Lokomotiv Tashkent	64	(5)
2024	Neftchi Fergana	16	(2)
2025–	Dinamo Samarqand	41	(1)

International career^{‡}
2019–	Uzbekistan	13	(1)
- * Club domestic league appearances and goals as of 28 July 2026 ‡ National team caps and goals as of 11:58, 15 June 2021 (UTC)

Sanjar Kodirkulov (born 27 May 1997 in Tashkent, Uzbekistan) is an Uzbekistani footballer who currently plays for Dinamo Samarqand.

== Career statistics ==
=== Club ===
As of match played 3 October 2018

Club	Season	League			National Cup		Continental		Other		Total	
Club	Season	Division	Apps	Goals	Apps	Goals	Apps	Goals	Apps	Goals	Apps	Goals
Bunyodkor	2016	Uzbek League	1	0	0	0	3	0	-		4	0
Bunyodkor	2017	Uzbek League	0	0	0	0	0	0	-		0	0
Bunyodkor	2018	Uzbek League	13	0	2	0	-		-		15	0
Bunyodkor	2019	Uzbek League	25	2	4	1	-		2	0	31	3
Bunyodkor	Total		39	2	6	1	3	0	2	0	50	3
Metallurg Bekabad (loan)	2017	Uzbek League	27	1	1	0	–		–		28	1
Career total			66	3	7	1	3	0	2	0	78	4

=== International ===
Uzbekistan national team
Year	Apps	Goals
2019	5	1
Total	5	1

Statistics accurate as of match played 19 November 2019

=== International goals ===
Scores and results list Uzbekistan's goal tally first.

No.	Date	Venue	Opponent	Score	Result	Competition
1.	5 September 2019	Pakhtakor Central Stadium, Tashkent, Uzbekistan	Yemen	1–0	5–0	2022 FIFA World Cup qualification
