= Islom Kobilov =

Uzbekistani footballer (born 1997)

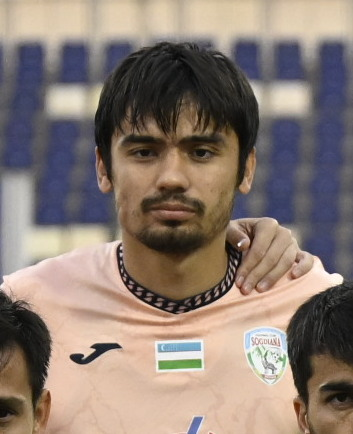

Personal information
- Full name: Islom Kobilov
- Date of birth: 1 July 1997 (age 29)
- Place of birth: Fergana, Uzbekistan
- Height: 1.83 m (6 ft 0 in)
- Position: Defender

Team information
- Current team: Sogdiana Jizzakh
- Number: 3

Senior career*
Years	Team	Apps	(Gls)
2016	Metallurg Bekabad	18	(1)
2017–2020	Bunyodkor	65	(4)
2017	→ Metallurg Bekabad (loan)	11	(2)
2021–2023	Lokomotiv Tashkent	68	(1)
2024–	Sogdiana Jizzakh	67	(4)

International career^{‡}
- Uzbekistan U-23
2018–	Uzbekistan	13	(0)
- * Club domestic league appearances and goals as of 29 July 2026 ‡ National team caps and goals as of 27 January 2022 (UTC)

Islom Kobilov (born 1 July 1997) is an Uzbekistani footballer who currently plays for Sogdiana Jizzakh.

== Career ==
=== Club ===
On 26 July 2017, FC Bunyodkor announced that Kobilov had returned from a loan deal with Metallurg Bekabad.

== Career statistics ==
=== Club ===
As of match played 30 March 2018

Club	Season	League			National Cup		Continental		Other		Total	
Club	Season	Division	Apps	Goals	Apps	Goals	Apps	Goals	Apps	Goals	Apps	Goals
Bunyodkor	2017	Uzbek League	10	1	2	0	0	0	-		12	1
Bunyodkor	2018	Uzbek League	9	0	0	0	-		-		9	0
Bunyodkor	Total		19	1	2	0	0	0	-	-	21	1
Career total			19	1	2	0	0	0	-	-	21	1

=== International ===
Uzbekistan national team
Year	Apps	Goals
2018	1	0
Total	1	0

Statistics accurate as of match played 19 May 2018

== Honours ==
=== International ===
Uzbekistan U-23

- AFC U-23 Championship (1): 2018
