= Erkin Boydullayev =

Uzbek footballer (born 1984)

Personal information
- Full name: Erkin Boydullayev
- Date of birth: 10 October 1984 (age 42)
- Place of birth: Uzbekistan
- Height: 1.80 m (5 ft 11 in)
- Position: Midfielder

Team information
- Current team: Qizilqum Zarafshon
- Number: 6

Senior career*
Years	Team	Apps	(Gls)
2003	Guliston	16	(0)
2005	Sogdiana Jizzakh	12	(1)
2007	Kuruvchi	11	(0)
2007–2008	Lokomotiv Tashkent	37	(3)
2009–2010	Dinamo Samarqand	51	(7)
2011–2016	Nasaf	122	(5)
2016–2019	Qizilqum Zarafshon	84	(1)
2019–2020	AGMK	18	(2)
2020–2022	Qizilqum Zarafshon	46	(6)
2022–	Dinamo Samarqand	17	(0)

International career
2013–	Uzbekistan	1	(0)
- * Club domestic league appearances and goals as of 07:01, 26 May 2021 (UTC)

Erkin Boydullayev (born 10 October 1984) is an Uzbek professional footballer who plays as a midfielder for Dinamo Samarqand.

== Career statistics ==
=== International ===
Uzbekistan national team
Year	Apps	Goals
2013	1	0
Total	1	0

As of match played 1 February 2013.
