= Yevhen Chumak =

Ukrainian footballer

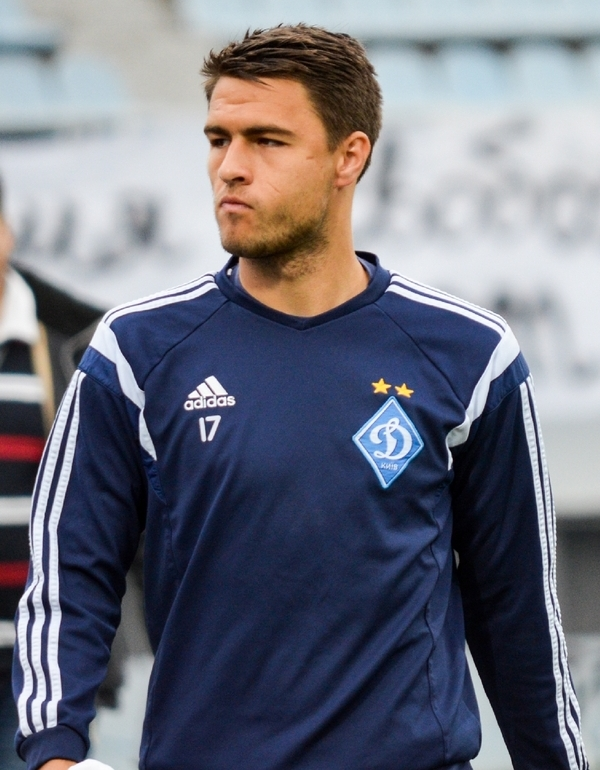

Personal information
- Full name: Yevhen Anatoliyovych Chumak
- Date of birth: 25 August 1995 (age 31)
- Place of birth: Hlukhivtsi, Ukraine
- Height: 1.81 m (5 ft 11 in)
- Position: Midfielder

Team information
- Current team: Kyrgyzaltyn
- Number: 22

Youth career
- 2002–2010: Dynamo Kyiv
- 2010–2012: RVUFK Kyiv

Senior career*
Years	Team	Apps	(Gls)
2012–2016	Dynamo Kyiv	2	(1)
2015	→ Hoverla Uzhhorod (loan)	11	(0)
2016	→ Torpedo-BelAZ Zhodino (loan)	11	(1)
2016	→ Zirka Kropyvnytskyi (loan)	5	(0)
2016	Karpaty Lviv	3	(0)
2017	Dnepr Mogilev	14	(3)
2018	Desna Chernihiv	10	(2)
2019	Shevardeni-1906 Tbilisi	14	(3)
2019	Bunyodkor	3	(0)
2020–2021	Metallurg Bekabad	27	(1)
2021	Turan	4	(0)
2022	Dinamo Samarqand	20	(1)
2023	FC Arys	3	(0)
2024	Agropoli	10	(0)
2024	FC OshSU-Aldier	13	(2)
2025–	Kyrgyzaltyn	5	(1)

International career
2012–2013	Ukraine U18	8	(0)
2013–2014	Ukraine U19	9	(0)
2014–2015	Ukraine U20	9	(1)
2015	Ukraine U21	1	(0)
2019	Ukraine (students)		
- * Club domestic league appearances and goals as of 16 April 2025

Yevhen Anatoliyovych Chumak (Ukrainian: Євген Анатолійович Чумак; born 25 August 1995) is a Ukrainian professional footballer who plays as a midfielder for Kyrgyzaltyn.

== Career ==
He is a product of Dynamo Kyiv and RVUFK Kyiv academies. His first coach was Oleksandr Shpakov. He made his professional debut and scored his first goal in the Ukrainian Premier League for Dynamo Kyiv on 1 March 2015 in a match against Metalist Kharkiv. He spent the following season on loan with Torpedo-BelAZ Zhodino, where he won the 2015–16 Belarusian Cup. Upon his return to Kyiv, he transferred, in 2017, to Dnepr Mogilev. After only one season at Mogilev, he moved to Desna Chernihiv in the Ukrainian First League before moving in short order to Uzbek side Bunyodkor, Kazakh side Turan, Uzbek side Dinamo Samarqand, and finally Italian lower league side Agropoli over the next five seasons.

== Honours ==
=== Club ===
Dynamo Kyiv

- Ukrainian Premier League: 2014–15
- Ukrainian Cup: 2014–15

Torpedo-BelAZ Zhodino

- Belarusian Cup: 2015–16
