= Jamshid Boltaboev =

Uzbek football player (born 1996)

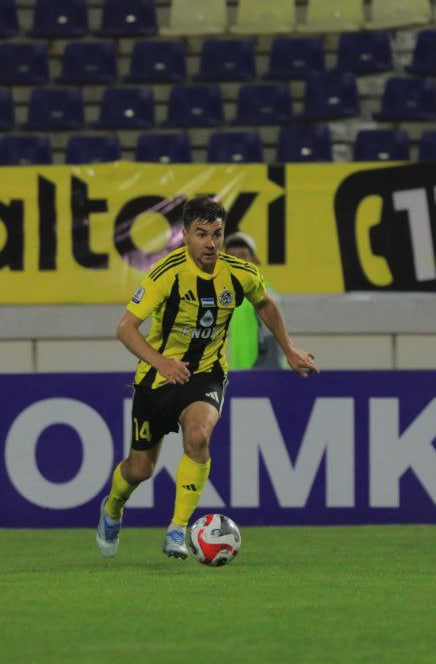

Personal information
- Date of birth: October 3, 1996 (age 30)
- Place of birth: Kegeyli, Uzbekistan
- Height: 1.74 m (5 ft 8 1/2 in)
- Positions: Full-back; centre-back; central defensive midfielder

Team information
- Current team: Sogdiana
- Number: 8

Youth career
- Pakhtakor

Senior career*
Years	Team	Apps	(Gls)
2014–2018	Pakhtakor	23	(2)
2015–2018	→ Pakhtakor-2 (loan)	37	(3)
2019–2021	Sogdiana Jizzakh	67	(4)
2022–2024	Navbahor Namangan	72	(7)
2025	Neftchi Fergana	10	(0)
2025	Navbahor Namangan	11	(0)
2026	Andijon	7	(0)
2026–	Sogdiana	3	(0)

International career^{‡}
2013	Uzbekistan U17	3	(1)
2014	Uzbekistan U19	4	(0)
2016	Uzbekistan U23	2	(0)
2016–	Uzbekistan	4	(0)
Medal record
Representing Uzbekistan
CAFA Nations Cup
Runner-up	2023 Kyrgyzstan–Uzbekistan	Team
- * Club domestic league appearances and goals as of 29 July 2026 ‡ National team caps and goals as of 30 January 2024 (UTC)

Jamshid Boltaboev (born 3 October 1996) is an Uzbek professional footballer playing for Sogdiana and the Uzbek national team. A versatile defensive utility player, he can operate in positions including: centre-back, right-back, and defensive midfielder.

== Career ==
=== Youth career ===
Not long after the 2012 AFC U-16 Championship, he impressed foreign European scouts so much as that several clubs sent trial proposals but he chose AS Monaco FC and took part in a six-day training with the As Monaco Academy and participated in a friendly match.

=== Neftchi Fergana ===
Boltaboev left Navbakhir at the end of the 2024 season and signed with Neftchi on 8 January 2025.

=== International ===
During his first game for the Uzbekistan national under-23 football team countering Asian giants South Korea U-23, he got a red card by inflicting a rash tackle in the 72nd minute, missing the match against Iraq U23.

In 2013, the former U-17 international was named the Best Young Player of the Year along with compatriots Akobir Turaev and Izzatilla Abdullayev.

== Career statistics ==
=== International ===
Boltaboev made his debut for the Uzbekistan main team on 14 February 2016 in a Friendly match against Lebanon.

Uzbekistan national team
Year	Apps	Goals
2016	1	0
2017	0	0
2018	0	0
2019	0	0
2020	0	0
2021	0	0
2022	0	0
2023	1	0
2024	1	0
Total	3	0

Statistics accurate as of match played 23 January 2024.

=== International goals ===
#	Opponent	Year	Result	Scored
1.	Croatia U17	2013	2–1	1

== Honours ==
- 2x Uzbek League winner
- 2x Uzbekistan Super Cup runners-up
- 1x Best Young Player of the Year award
