= Markaziy Stadium (Namangan) =

Sports venue in Namangan, Uzbekistan

Coordinates: 40°59′59″N 71°35′38″E

Navbahor Central Stadium
- Uzbek: Navbahor markaziy stadioni
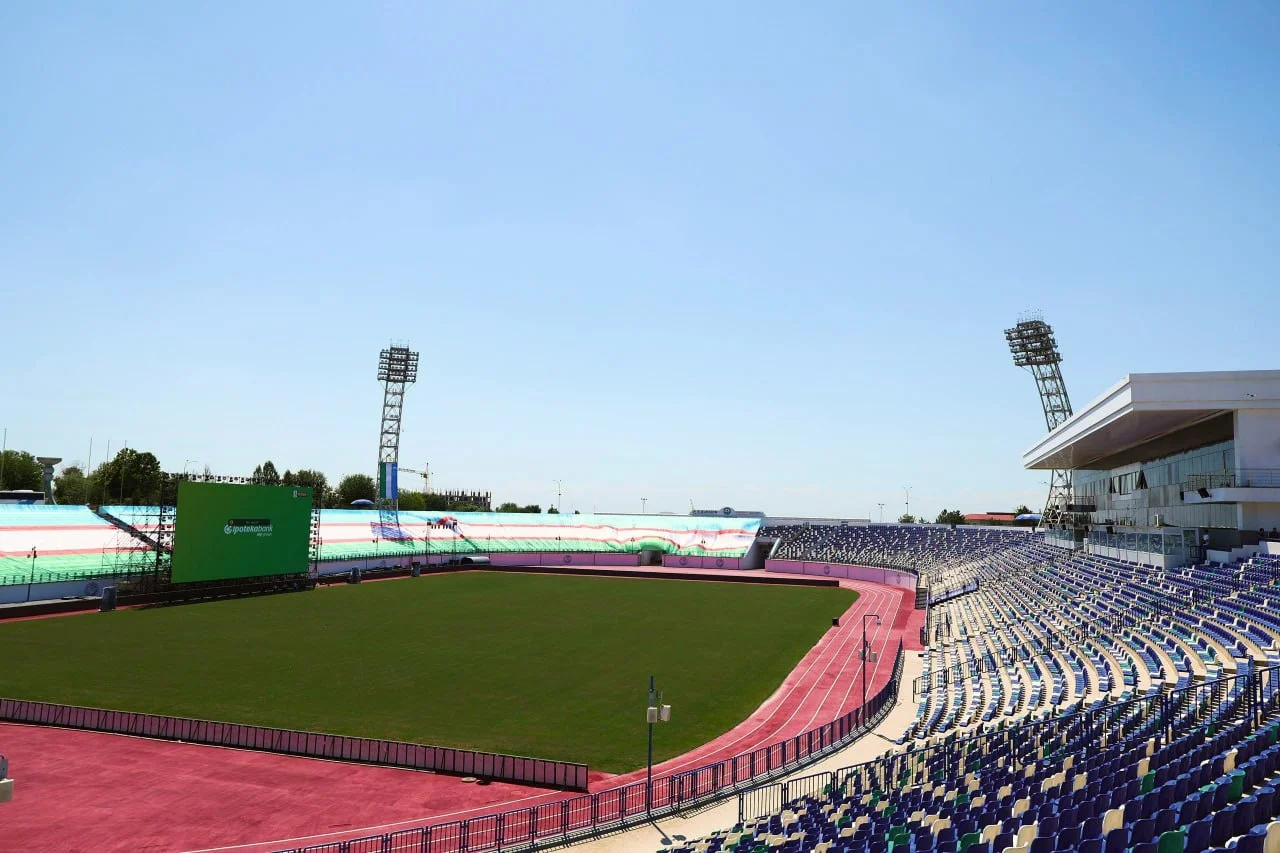
- UZB
- Interactive map of Navbahor Central Stadium
- Location: Namangan city
- Owner: Navbahor Namangan
- Operator: PFC Navbahor
- Capacity: 45,000 (1956-2009); 21.913 (2013-)
- Surface: Grass
- Record attendance: More 45,000 (in the USSR)
- Field size: 112 m × 72 m (122 yd × 79 yd)

Construction
- Built: 1954–1956
- Opened: 11 August 1956; 70 years ago
- Renovated: 1975, 1989, 2009, 2013, 2018
- General contractor: USSR Ministry of Construction

Tenants
- PFC Navbahor (1956–present); Uzbekistan national football team (2018–present); Uzbekistan U-16, U-17, U-20, U-23 and Women national teams

Markaziy Stadium is a multi-use stadium in Namangan, Uzbekistan. It is currently used mostly for football matches. The stadium holds 22,000 people. It is the home stadium of PFC Navbahor Namangan.
