= Metallurg Bekabad Stadium =

Stadium in Bekabad, Uzbekistan

Coordinates: 40°12′48″N 69°16′45″E

A. Anokhin Stadium
- Interactive map of A. Anokhin Stadium
- Location: Bekabad, Uzbekistan
- Capacity: 11,173 (football)
- Surface: Grass

Construction
- Renovated: 2012
- Expanded: 15,000

Tenant
- Metallurg Bekabad

Metallurg Bekabad Stadium is the football stadium in Bekabad.

== History ==
Originally the stadium had capacity of 5,000. After reconstruction works of the old stadium in 2012, capacity of new the new all-seater stadium increased to 15,000.
