= Jovlon Ibrokhimov =

Uzbekistani professional footballer (born 1990)

Personal information
- Full name: Jovlon Ibrokhimov
- Date of birth: 10 December 1990 (age 35)
- Place of birth: Qarshi, Uzbekistan
- Height: 1.75 m (5 ft 9 in)
- Position: Midfielder

Team information
- Current team: Navbahor Namangan
- Number: 8

Senior career*
| Years | Team | Apps | (Gls) |
| 2007 | Traktor Tashkent | 9 | (0) |
| 2008 | Nasaf Qarshi | 4 | (0) |
| 2009–2010 | Lokomotiv Tashkent | 26 | (2) |
| 2011–2019 | Bunyodkor | 168 | (20) |
| 2019 | Suwon | 8 | (0) |
| 2020– | Navbahor Namangan | 11 | (0) |

International career^{‡}
| 2011– | Uzbekistan | 9 | (0) |
- * Club domestic league appearances and goals as of 10 July 2020 ‡ National team caps and goals as of 26 February 2019

Jovlon Ibrokhimov (Russian: Жавлон Ибрагимов; born 10 December 1990) is an Uzbekistani professional footballer who currently plays as a midfielder for PFC Navbahor Namangan.

== Career ==
=== Club ===
On 24 February 2011 FC Bunyodkors site presented and announced Jovlon Ibrokhimov as Bunyodkor's player for Season 2011.

On 18 February 2019, FC Bunyodkor announced that Ibrokhimov had joined Suwon.

=== International ===
Ibrokhimov has made appearances for the Uzbekistan national football team in the 2014 FIFA World Cup qualifying rounds.
