= 2020 Uzbekistan Super League =

Twenty-eighth season of top-level football in Uzbekistan

- Season: 2020
- Dates: 27 February — 3 December
- Champions: Pakhtakor
- Relegated: Buxoro
- AFC Champions League: Pakhtakor; AGMK
- Matches: 182
- Goals: 450 (2.47 per match)
- Top goalscorer: Dragan Ćeran (20 goals)
- Biggest home win: Pakhtakor 7–0 Lokomotiv (24 August 2020)
- Biggest away win: Surkhon 0–6 Pakhtakor (24 October 2020); AGMK 0–6 Pakhtakor (1 November 2020)
- Highest scoring: Pakhtakor 7–0 Lokomotiv (24 August 2020); Bunyodkor 6–2 Andijon (22 October 2020)
- Longest winning run: Pakhtakor (7 matches)
- Longest unbeaten run: Pakhtakor (17 matches)
- Longest winless run: Andijon (17 matches)
- Longest losing run: Mash'al (7 matches)
- Highest attendance: 15,320; Pakhtakor – Lokomotiv (27 February 2020)
- Lowest attendance: 60; Pakhtakor – Lokomotiv (17 October 2020)
- Total attendance: 175,786
- Average attendance: 2,313
- All statistics correct as of 3 December 2020.

The 2020 Uzbekistan Super League (in Uzbek: Футбол бўйича 2020-йилги Ўзбекистон Суперлигаси; known as the Coca-Cola Uzbekistan Super League for sponsorship reasons) was the 29th season of top-level football in Uzbekistan since its establishment on 1992. Pakhtakor Tashkent were the defending champions from the 2019 campaign.

== Season events ==
On 16 March, all football competitions in Uzbekistan were postponed due to the COVID-19 pandemic.

On 20 July, the Uzbekistan Super League was suspended for a second time due to COVID-19 pandemic in Uzbekistan, with it being announced on 24 July that the league would resume on 3 August with the scheduled 10th round matches.

== Teams ==
Location of teams in 2020 Uzbekistan Super League

Club	Coach	Location	Stadium	Capacity	Kit sponsor	Shirt sponsor
AGMK	(Uzbekistan) Mirjalol Qosimov	Olmaliq	AGMK Stadium	12,000	(Germany) Adidas	OKMK
Andijon	(Russia) Viktor Kumykov	Andijan	Soghlom Avlod Stadium	18,360	(Germany) Puma	GM Uzbekistan
Bukhara	(Uzbekistan) Jamshid Saidov	Bukhoro	Buxoro Arena	22,700	(Spain) Joma	BNQIZ
Bunyodkor	(Uzbekistan) Vadim Abramov	Tashkent	Bunyodkor Stadium	34,000	(United States) Nike	UzTransGaz, Driver's Village^{1}
Kokand 1912	(Uzbekistan) Bakhtiyor Ashurmatov	Kokand	Kokand Stadium	10,500	(Germany) Adidas	
Lokomotiv	(Uzbekistan) Timur Kapadze (Uzbekistan) Andrey Miklyaev	Tashkent	Lokomotiv Stadium	8,000	(Spain) Joma	Orient Finance Bank, Uztelecom^{1}
Mash'al	(Uzbekistan) Dilyaver Vaniyev	Muborak	Bahrom Vafoev Stadium	10,000	(Germany) Saller	Uzbekneftegaz
Metallurg	(Uzbekistan) Andrey Shipilov	Bekabad	Metallurg Stadium	15,000	(Germany) Adidas	Uzbekistan Metallurgy Combinat
Nasaf	(Uzbekistan) Ruziqul Berdiev	Qarshi	Qarshi Stadium	16,000	(Germany) Adidas	Uzbekistan GTL SGCC, ENTER Engineering^{1}
Navbahor	(Russia) Andrey Kanchelskis	Namangan	Namangan Markazi Stadium	22,000	(Germany) Puma	
Pakhtakor	(Georgia (country)) Shota Arveladze	Tashkent	Pakhtakor Stadium	35,000	(Germany) Adidas	Red Metal AG Company, Euroasia Insurance^{1}
Qizilqum	(Turkmenistan) Täçmyrat Agamyradow	Zarafshan	Youth	12,500	(Germany) Adidas	Navoi Mining and Metallurgy Combinat NKMK^{1}
Sogdiana	(Uzbekistan) Ulugbek Bakayev	Jizzakh	Sogdiana Stadium	11,650	(Spain) Joma	UzbekEnergo
Surkhon	(Uzbekistan) Ravshan Khaydarov	Termez	Alpomish Arena	6,000	(Germany) Adidas	UzbekGidroEnergo

- ^{1} On the back of the strip.

=== Managerial changes ===
Team	Outgoing manager	Manner of departure	Date of vacancy	Position in table	Replaced by	Date of appointment
Qizilqum	(Uzbekistan) Hamidjon Aktamov	Sacked	8 March 2020	12th	(Turkmenistan) Täçmyrat Agamyradow	4 June 2020
Andijon	(Russia) Alexander Khomyakov	Resigned	17 March 2020	11th	(Russia) Viktor Kumykov	11 May 2020
Surkhon	(Uzbekistan) Bakhrom Khaydarov	Resigned	26 June 2020	11th	(Russia) Alexander Khomyakov	27 June 2020
Surkhon	(Russia) Alexander Khomyakov	Sacked	30 June 2020	11th	(Uzbekistan) Ravshan Khaydarov	4 July 2020
Buxoro	(Tajikistan) Mukhsin Mukhamadiev	Sacked	18 July 2020	14th	(Mexico) Julio Hernandeź	24 July 2020
Buxoro	(Mexico) Julio Hernandeź	Sacked	2 August 2020	14th	(Uzbekistan) Jamshid Saidov	4 August 2020
Lokomotiv	(Russia) Andrei Fyodorov	Resigned	20 August 2020	8th	(Uzbekistan) Dilshod Nuraliev (caretaker)	19 August 2020
Lokomotiv	(Uzbekistan) Dilshod Nuraliev (caretaker)	Resigned	28 August 2020	10th	(Uzbekistan) Andrey Miklyaev	29 August 2020

== Foreign players ==
The number of foreign players is restricted to five per USL team. A team can use only five foreign players on the field in each game.

Club	Player 1	Player 2	Player 3	Player 4	AFC players	Naturalized Players	Former players
AGMK	(Georgia (country)) **Elgujja Grigalashvili**	(Georgia (country)) **Mate Vatsadze**	(Montenegro) Igor Zonjić	(Serbia) **Jovan Đokić**	(Turkmenistan) **Arslanmyrat Amanow**		
Andijan	**(Nigeria) Emmanuel Ariwachukwu**	(Ukraine) Dmytro Zozulya					(Moldova) Artiom Litviacov (Nigeria) Michael Okoro Ibe
Bunyodkor	(Tajikistan) **Davron Ergashev**				(Turkmenistan) Selim Nurmyradow		
Bukhara							(Croatia) Edin Junuzović (Georgia (country)) **Jaba Lipartia** (Ukraine) Artem Baranovskyi (Canada) Milovan Kapor
Kokand 1912	(Ivory Coast) Yacouba Bamba	(Serbia) Ivan Josović	(Serbia) Filip Rajevac				
Lokomotiv Tashkent	(Georgia (country)) **Kakhi Makharadze**	(Montenegro) Slavko Damjanović	(Russia) Kirill Pogrebnyak				
Mash'al Mubarek	(Cameroon) Ella Ken	(Nigeria) **Ifeanyi Ifeanyi**	(Nigeria) Michael Okoro Ibe	(Ukraine) Denys Vasilyev			**(Turkmenistan) Didar Durdyýew**
Metallurg Bekabad	(Russia) Andrey Shipilov	(Ukraine) Yevhen Chumak					
Nasaf	(Burkina Faso) Faysal Traoré	(Serbia) Marko Stanojević					(Bosnia and Herzegovina) Haris Dilaver
Navbahor	(Russia) Ruslan Bolov	(Russia) Ivan Solovyov	(Russia) **Pavel Golyshev**		(Tajikistan) **Ehson Panjshanbe**	(Russia) → (Uzbekistan) Igor Golban	**(Tajikistan) Amirbek Juraboev**
Pakhtakor	(Serbia) Dragan Ćeran	(Switzerland) **Eren Derdiyok**					
Qizilqum	(Belarus) Uladzislaw Kasmynin	(Nigeria) Ibrahim Tomiwa	(Russia) Ruslan Margiev	(Russia) Oleg Tolmasov			(Turkmenistan) **Wezirgeldi Ylýasow** (Turkmenistan) **Abdy Bäşimow** (Namibia) **McCartney Naweseb**
Sogdiana	(Serbia) Marko Kolaković	(Serbia) Milan Mitrović					(Brazil) Elivelto
Surkhon	(Serbia) Darko Stanojević	(Ukraine) Oleksandr Kasyan					(Serbia) Vladimir Bubanja

In bold: Players that have been capped for their national team.

== League table ==
Pos	Team	Pld	W	D	L	GF	GA	GD	Pts	Qualification or relegation
1	Pakhtakor (C)	26	21	2	3	76	18	+58	65	Qualification to the 2021 AFC Champions League group stage
2	Nasaf	26	15	8	3	47	19	+28	53	Qualification to the 2021 AFC Cup group stage
3	AGMK	26	14	7	5	39	28	+11	49	Qualification to the 2021 AFC Champions League play-off round
4	Bunyodkor	26	12	7	7	43	36	+7	43	
5	Kokand 1912	26	13	3	10	35	28	+7	42	
6	Sogdiana	26	10	8	8	34	32	+2	38	
7	Metallurg	26	10	6	10	30	30	0	36	
8	Navbahor	26	8	11	7	24	21	+3	35	
9	Lokomotiv	26	10	5	11	28	38	−10	35	
10	Mash'al	26	8	5	13	23	31	−8	29	
11	Qizilqum	26	5	10	11	19	37	−18	25	
12	Surkhon	26	4	5	17	17	44	−27	17	
13	Andijon (O)	26	2	10	14	16	38	−22	16	Relegation play off Uzbekistan Pro League
14	Buxoro (R)	26	1	11	14	19	50	−31	14	Relegation to Uzbekistan Pro League

Source: Uzbekistan Professional Football League
Rules for classification: 1) points; 2) head-to-head points; 3) head-to-head goal difference; 4) head-to-head away goals scored; 5) goal difference; 6) number of goals scored.
(C) Champions; (O) Play-off winners; (R) Relegated

=== Round 1 ===
27 February 2020 1	Kokand 1912	3–0	Buxoro	Qoʻqon
UZT (UTC+5)	Xolmuhammedov 17', 69'; Roʻziyev 85'	Report (in Uzbek)		Stadium: Kokand; Referee: Temurbek Toʻxtasinov

27 February 2020 2	Paxtakor	2–1	Navbahor	Tashkent
UZT (UTC+5)	Sergeev 50', 88'	Report (in Uzbek)	Solovyov 26'	Stadium: Paxtakor; Referee: Ilgiz Tantashev

28 February 2020 3	Lokomotiv	2–1	Andijon	Tashkent
UZT (UTC+5)	Pogrebnyak 9', 30'	Report (in Uzbek)	Hasanov 87'	Stadium: Lokomotiv; Attendance: 3210; Referee: Ahrol Risqullayev

29 February 2020 4	Mashʼal	3–0	Sogdiana	Muborak
UZT (UTC+5)	Meliyev 2'; Pavlenko 11'; Normurodov 90+1'	Report (in Uzbek)		Stadium: Bahrom Vafoyev; Attendance: 3500; Referee: Sherzod Qosimov

29 February 2020 5	AGMK	1–1	Metallurg	Olmaliq
UZT (UTC+5)	Vatsadze 9'	Report (in Uzbek)	Toshqoʻziyev 28'	Stadium: OKMK; Attendance: 3727; Referee: Zokir Qodirov

1 March 2020 6	Surxon	1–3	Bunyodkor	Termiz
UZT (UTC+5)	Ibragimov 90+3'	Report (in Uzbek)	Toʻxtasinov 60'; Murtozoyev 80'; Ikromov 83'	Stadium: Alpomish; Attendance: 3920; Referee: Viktor Serazitdinov

1 March 2020 7	Qizilqum	1–3	Nasaf	Navoiy
UZT (UTC+5)	Naweseb 22'	Report (in Uzbek)	Muhiddinov 25'; Abduholiqov 41', 47'	Stadium: Youth; Attendance: 3752; Referee: Jasur Muxtorov

=== Round 2 ===
6 March 2020 1	Navbahor	2–0	Lokomotiv	Namangan
UZT (UTC+5)	Ahmedov 88'; Golban 90'	Report (in Uzbek)		Stadium: Navbahor; Attendance: 25328; Referee: Temurbek Toʻxtasinov

6 March 2020 2	Metallurg	1–0	Kokand 1912	Bekabad
UZT (UTC+5)	Andreyev 23'	Report (in Uzbek)		Stadium: Metallurg; Attendance: 5221; Referee: Vadim Agishev

6 March 2020 3	Bunyodkor	1–0	Mashʼal	Tashkent
UZT (UTC+5)	Jaloliddinov 10'	Report (in Uzbek)		Stadium: Bunyodkor; Attendance: 1465; Referee: Akobirxoʻja Shukurullayev

7 March 2020 4	Sogdiana	1–1	AGMK	Jizzax
UZT (UTC+5)	Orifov 54'	Report (in Uzbek)	Zonjić 85'	Stadium: Sogdiana; Attendance: 2572; Referee: Aziz Asimov

7 March 2020 5	Qizilqum	1–2	Surxon	Navoiy
UZT (UTC+5)	Margiyev 11'	Report (in Uzbek)	Kasyan 2'; Karimov 44'	Stadium: Youth; Attendance: 2358; Referee: Asker Najafaliyev

8 March 2020 6	Paxtakor	3–0	Buxoro	Tashkent
UZT (UTC+5)	Ćeran 60', 82', 85'	Report (in Uzbek)		Stadium: Paxtakor; Attendance: 6732; Referee: Firdavs Norsafarov

8 March 2020 7	Nasaf	2–1	Andijon	Qarshi
UZT (UTC+5)	Abduholiqov 72'; Muhiddinov 84'	Report (in Uzbek)	Meliyev 10'	Stadium: Qarshi; Attendance: 8476; Referee: Elyor Tursunov

=== Round 3 ===
13 March 2020 1	Surxon	1–2	Nasaf	Termiz
UZT (UTC+5)	Kasyan 53'	Report (in Uzbek)	Stanojević 8'; Bozorov 61'	Stadium: Alpomish; Attendance: 5623; Referee: Ahrol Risqullayev

13 March 2020 2	AGMK	2–0	Bunyodkor	Olmaliq
UZT (UTC+5)	Toshmatov 19'; Erkinov 86'	Report (in Uzbek)		Stadium: OKMK; Attendance: 3200; Referee: Vadim Agishev

14 March 2020 3	Kokand 1912	2–1	Sogdiana	Qoʻqon
UZT (UTC+5)	Azimov 17'; Rajevac 45+3'	Report (in Uzbek)	Norkhonov 58'	Stadium: Kokand; Attendance: 4301; Referee: Zokir Qodirov

14 March 2020 4	Mashʼal	1–1	Qizilqum	Gʻuzor
UZT (UTC+5)	Meliyev 22'	Report (in Uzbek)	Abdullajonov 12'	Stadium: Bahrom Vafoyev; Attendance: 2911; Referee: Rustam Lutfullin

14 March 2020 5	Paxtakor	4–1	Metallurg	Tashkent
UZT (UTC+5)	Ćeran 30'; Sergeev 31'; Masharipov 53'; Derdiyok 72'	Report (in Uzbek)	Bobojonov 61'	Stadium: Paxtakor; Attendance: 5324; Referee: Jasur Muxtorov

15 March 2020 6	Lokomotiv	3–0	Buxoro	Tashkent
UZT (UTC+5)	Bikmayev 17'; Abduxoliqov 20'; Shaymanov 90+1'	Report (in Uzbek)		Stadium: Lokomotiv; Attendance: 1200; Referee: Ravshan Abduvohidov

15 March 2020 7	Andijon	0–0	Navbahor	Andijon
UZT (UTC+5)		Report (in Uzbek)		Stadium: Bobur; Attendance: 15152; Referee: Viktor Serazitdinov

=== Round 4 ===
13 June 2020 1	Bunyodkor	1–0	Kokand 1912	Tashkent
UZT (UTC+5)	Akbarov 86' (o.g.)	Report (in Uzbek)		Stadium: Bunyodkor; Attendance: Behind closed doors Referee: Jasur Muxtorov

13 June 2020 2	Qizilqum	1–0	AGMK	Navoiy
UZT (UTC+5)		Report (in Uzbek)	Grigalashvili 66'	Stadium: Youth; Attendance: Behind closed doors Referee: Ahrol Risqullayev

14 June 2020 3	Sogdiana	1–0	Paxtakor	Jizzax
UZT (UTC+5)	Norkhonov 50'	Report (in Uzbek)		Stadium: Sogdiana; Attendance: Behind closed doors Referee: Temurbek Toʻxtasinov

14 June 2020 4	Nasaf	2–2	Navbahor	Qarshi
UZT (UTC+5)	Abduholiqov 66'; Stanojević 87'	Report (in Uzbek)	Gʻofurov 5'; Oʻrinboyev 70'	Stadium: Qarshi; Attendance: Behind closed doors Referee: Sherzod Qosimov

15 June 2020 5	Surxon	2–2	Mashʼal	Termiz
UZT (UTC+5)	Gʻofurov 59'; Sulaymonov 82'	Report (in Uzbek)	Abdusalomov 48'; Pavlenko 54'	Stadium: Alpomish; Attendance: Behind closed doors Referee: Akobirxoʻja Shukurullayev

15 June 2020 6	Buxoro	2–2	Andijon	Muborak
UZT (UTC+5)	Hakimov 22'; Saʼdullayev 90+4'	Report (in Uzbek)	Hasanov 45', 55'	Stadium: Bahrom Vafoyev; Attendance: Behind closed doors Referee: Asker Najafaliyev

15 June 2020 7	Lokomotiv	0–3	Metallurg	Tashkent
UZT (UTC+5)		Report (in Uzbek)	Toshqoʻziyev 58'; Ubaydullayev 66'; Qutiboyev 71'	Stadium: Lokomotiv; Attendance: Behind closed doors Referee: Firdavs Norsafarov

=== Round 5 ===
19 June 2020 1	Kokand 1912	4–0	Qizilqum	Qoʻqon
UZT (UTC+5)	Haydarov 61'; Xolmuhammedov 88'; Merzlyakov 90'; Sindarov 90+3'	Report (in Uzbek)		Stadium: Qoʻqon; Attendance: Behind closed doors Referee: Vadim Agishev

19 June 2020 2	Paxtakor	5–0	Bunyodkor	Qoʻqon
UZT (UTC+5)	Sobirxoʻjayev 1'; Ćeran 40', 42'; Derdiyok 45'; Toʻrayev 63' (o.g.)	Report (in Uzbek)		Stadium: Qoʻqon; Attendance: Behind closed doors Referee: Sherzod Qosimov

20 June 2020 3	Navbahor	2–0	Buxoro	Namangan
UZT (UTC+5)	Solovyov 1'; Turgʻunboyev 88'	Report (in Uzbek)		Stadium: Navbahor; Attendance: Behind closed doors Referee: Viktor Serazitdinov

20 June 2020 4	Lokomotiv	1–2	Sogdiana	Tashkent
UZT (UTC+5)	Shaymanov 48' (o.g.)	Report (in Uzbek)	Hasanov 52'; Pogrebnyak 58'	Stadium: Lokomotiv; Attendance: Behind closed doors Referee: Aziz Asimov

20 June 2020 5	AGMK	1–0	Surxon	Olmaliq
UZT (UTC+5)	Amanov 90+2'	Report (in Uzbek)		Stadium: OKMK; Attendance: Behind closed doors Referee: Rustam Lutfullin

21 June 2020 6	Mashʼal	0–0	Nasaf	Muborak
UZT (UTC+5)		Report (in Uzbek)		Stadium: Bahrom Vafoyev; Attendance: Behind closed doors Referee: Shavkat Nasibullayev

21 June 2020 7	Andijon	0–2	Metallurg	Andijon
UZT (UTC+5)		Report (in Uzbek)	Andreyev 36', 45+1'	Stadium: Bobur; Attendance: Behind closed doors Referee: Ravshan Abduvohidov

=== Round 6 ===
25 June 2020 1	Kokand 1912	3–0	Surxon	Qoʻqon
UZT (UTC+5)	Rajevac 50'; Xolmuhammedov 70'; Berdiyev 90+4'	Report (in Uzbek)		Stadium: Qoʻqon; Attendance: Behind closed doors Referee: Aziz Asimov

25 June 2020 2	Bunyodkor	2–0	Lokomotiv	Tashkent
UZT (UTC+5)	Nurmurodov 19'; Erkinov 74'	Report (in Uzbek)		Stadium: Bunyodkor; Attendance: Behind closed doors Referee: Akobirxoʻja Shukurullayev

25 June 2020 3	Qizilqum	0–2	Paxtakor	Navoiy
UZT (UTC+5)		Report (in Uzbek)	Hamdamov 47'; Derdiyok 72'	Stadium: Youth; Attendance: Behind closed doors Referee: Firdavs Norsafarov

26 June 2020 4	Nasaf	0–0	Buxoro	Qarshi
UZT (UTC+5)		Report (in Uzbek)		Stadium: Qarshi; Attendance: Behind closed doors Referee: Ahrol Risqullayev

26 June 2020 5	Sogdiana	1–1	Andijon	Jizzax
UZT (UTC+5)	Norkhonov 63'	Report (in Uzbek)	Bekmurodov 90+2'	Stadium: Sogdiana; Attendance: Behind closed doors Referee: Jasur Muxtorov

27 June 2020 6	AGMK	1–0	Mashʼal	Olmaliq
UZT (UTC+5)	Abdurahimov 71'	Report (in Uzbek)		Stadium: OKMK; Attendance: Behind closed doors Referee: Asker Najafaliyev

27 June 2020 7	Metallurg	1–3	Navbahor	Bekabad
UZT (UTC+5)	Andreyev 21'	Report (in Uzbek)	Turgʻunboyev 10', 40'; Bolov 75'	Stadium: Metallurg; Attendance: Behind closed doors Referee: Temurbek Toʻxtasinov

=== Round 7 ===
1 July 2020 1	Andijon	0–0	Bunyodkor	Andijon
UZT (UTC+5)		Report (in Uzbek)		Stadium: Bobur; Attendance: Behind closed doors Referee: Shavkat Nasibullayev

1 July 2020 2	Lokomotiv	3–0	Qizilqum	Tashkent
UZT (UTC+5)	Oʻlmasaliyev 69'; Pogrebnyak 87'; Turopov 89'	Report (in Uzbek)		Stadium: Lokomotiv; Attendance: Behind closed doors Referee: Ravshan Abduvohidov

1 July 2020 3	Kokand 1912	2–0	Mashʼal	Qoʻqon
UZT (UTC+5)	Xolmuhammedov 53', 88'	Report (in Uzbek)		Stadium: Qoʻqon; Attendance: Behind closed doors Referee: Viktor Serazitdinov

2 July 2020 4	Buxoro	1–4	Metallurg	Muborak
UZT (UTC+5)	Neʼmatov 38'	Report (in Uzbek)	Otaxonov 33'; Andreyev 51'; Ubaydullayev 53', 59'	Stadium: Bahrom Vafoyev; Attendance: Behind closed doors Referee: Sherzod Qosimov

2 July 2020 5	AGMK	2–1	Nasaf	Olmaliq
UZT (UTC+5)	Tursunov 20'; Boydullayev 56'	Report (in Uzbek)	Stanojević 27'	Stadium: OKMK; Attendance: Behind closed doors Referee: Jasur Muxtorov

2 July 2020 6	Navbahor	2–0	Sogdiana	Namangan
UZT (UTC+5)	Bolov 72'; Solovyov 86'	Report (in Uzbek)		Stadium: Navbahor; Attendance: Behind closed doors Referee: Vadim Agishev

2 July 2020 7	Paxtakor	3–1	Surxon	Tashkent
UZT (UTC+5)	Hamdamov 38'; Sobirxoʻjayev 38'; Ćeran 66'	Report (in Uzbek)	Kasyan 23'	Stadium: Paxtakor; Attendance: Behind closed doors Referee: Elyor Tursunov

=== Round 8 ===
6 July 2020 1	Qizilqum	1–1	Andijon	Navoiy
UZT (UTC+5)	Joʻrayev 69'	Report (in Uzbek)	Meliyev 90+1'	Stadium: Youth; Attendance: Behind closed doors Referee: Akobirxoʻja Shukurullayev

6 July 2020 2	Lokomotiv	2–1	Surxon	Tashkent
UZT (UTC+5)	Ibrohimov 20'; Bikmayev 68'	Report (in Uzbek)	Mehmonov 31'	Stadium: Lokomotiv; Attendance: Behind closed doors Referee: Ilgiz Tantashev

6 July 2020 3	Nasaf	1–0	Metallurg	Qarshi
UZT (UTC+5)	Mozgovoy 90+2'	Report (in Uzbek)		Stadium: Qarshi; Attendance: Behind closed doors Referee: Aziz Asimov

7 July 2020 4	Paxtakor	3–0	Mashʼal	Tashkent
UZT (UTC+5)	Derdiyok 25', 57'; Ćeran 75'	Report (in Uzbek)		Stadium: Paxtakor; Attendance: Behind closed doors Referee: Zokir Qodirov

7 July 2020 5	AGMK	3–0	Kokand 1912	Olmaliq
UZT (UTC+5)	Grigalashvili 54'; Tursunov 56'	Report (in Uzbek)	Bamba 90+1'	Stadium: OKMK; Attendance: Behind closed doors Referee: Temurbek Toʻxtasinov

7 July 2020 6	Bunyodkor	3–1	Navbahor	Tashkent
UZT (UTC+5)	Ahmadaliyev 26'; Erkinov 28'; Nurmurodov 88'	Report (in Uzbek)	Golban 57'	Stadium: Bunyodkor; Attendance: Behind closed doors Referee: Asker Najafaliyev

7 July 2020 7	Sogdiana	3–1	Buxoro	Jizzax
UZT (UTC+5)	Norkhonov 22'; Qahramonov 59'; Rashidov 81'	Report (in Uzbek)	Farhodov 48'	Stadium: Sogdiana; Attendance: Behind closed doors Referee: Firdavs Norsafarov

=== Round 9 ===
12 July 2020 1	Andijon	0–1	Surxon	Andijon
UZT (UTC+5)		Report (in Uzbek)	Kasyan 48'	Stadium: Bobur; Attendance: Behind closed doors Referee: Ahrol Risqullayev

12 July 2020 2	Metallurg	2–0	Sogdiana	Bekabad
UZT (UTC+5)	Chumak 24'; Narzullayev 63'	Report (in Uzbek)		Stadium: Metallurg; Attendance: Behind closed doors Referee: Viktor Serazitdinov

13 July 2020 3	Paxtakor	2–2	AGMK	Tashkent
UZT (UTC+5)	Sergeev 72'; Hamdamov 74'	Report (in Uzbek)	Amanov 33'; Đokić 54'	Stadium: Paxtakor; Attendance: Behind closed doors Referee: Viktor Serazitdinov

13 July 2020 4	Navbahor	1–0	Qizilqum	Namangan
UZT (UTC+5)	Ahmedov 50'	Report (in Uzbek)		Stadium: Navbahor; Attendance: Behind closed doors Referee: Jasur Muxtorov

14 July 2020 5	Kokand 1912	2–2	Nasaf	Qoʻqon
UZT (UTC+5)	Akbarov 62', 86'	Report (in Uzbek)	Muhiddinov 54'; Bozorov 84'	Stadium: Qoʻqon; Attendance: Behind closed doors Referee: Vadim Agishev

14 July 2020 6	Lokomotiv	0–1	Mashʼal	Tashkent
UZT (UTC+5)		Report (in Uzbek)	Normurodov 71'	Stadium: Lokomotiv; Attendance: Behind closed doors Referee: Rahimbek Karimov

14 August 2020 7	Buxoro	1–1	Bunyodkor	Tashkent
UZT (UTC+5)	Erkinov 17' (o.g.)	Report (in Uzbek)	Qobilov 22'	Stadium: Paxtakor; Attendance: Behind closed doors Referee: Akobirxoʻja Shukurullayev

=== Round 10 ===
17 August 2020 1	Bunyodkor	2–0	Metallurg	Tashkent
UZT (UTC+5)	Toʻxtasinov 53', 59'	Report (in Uzbek)		Stadium: Bunyodkor; Attendance: Behind closed doors Referee: Vadim Agishev

17 August 2020 2	Nasaf	2–0	Sogdiana	Bekabad
UZT (UTC+5)	Kenjaboyev 15'; Abduholiqov 36'; Norchayev 90+1'	Report (in Uzbek)		Stadium: Metallurg; Attendance: Behind closed doors Referee: Asker Najafaliyev

17 August 2020 3	AGMK	3–1	Lokomotiv	Tashkent
UZT (UTC+5)	Polvonov 47'; Đokić 88'; Umarov 90+2'	Report (in Uzbek)	Bikmayev 36'	Stadium: Bunyodkor; Attendance: Behind closed doors Referee: Firdavs Norsafarov

18 August 2020 4	Qizilqum	1–0	Buxoro	Tashkent
UZT (UTC+5)	Tomiva 49'	Report (in Uzbek)		Stadium: Jar; Attendance: Behind closed doors Referee: Temurbek Toʻxtasinov

18 August 2020 5	Mashʼal	0–0	Andijon	Tashkent
UZT (UTC+5)		Report (in Uzbek)		Stadium: Paxtakor; Attendance: Behind closed doors Referee: Rustam Lutfullin

18 August 2020 6	Kokand 1912	1–3	Paxtakor	Qoʻqon
UZT (UTC+5)	Abduhamidov 81'	Report (in Uzbek)	Sergeev 25', 43'; Ismoilov 66'	Stadium: Qoʻqon; Attendance: Behind closed doors Referee: Shavkat Nasibullayev

19 August 2020 7	Surxon	1–1	Navbahor	Tashkent
UZT (UTC+5)	Karimov 60'	Report (in Uzbek)	Gʻofurov 64'	Stadium: TDTU; Attendance: Behind closed doors Referee: Zokir Qodirov

=== Round 11 ===
20 August 2020 1	Sogdiana	3–3	Bunyodkor	Tashkent
UZT (UTC+5)	Qahramonov 34'; Norkhonov 39', 77'	Report (in Uzbek)	Toʻxtasinov 35'; Gʻiyosov 47'; Toʻrayev 52'	Stadium: Lokomotiv; Attendance: Behind closed doors Referee: Sherzod Qosimov

21 August 2020 2	Andijon	1–3	AGMK	Tashkent
UZT (UTC+5)	Hasanov 51'	Report (in Uzbek)	Grigalashvili 62'; Tursunov 74'; Vatsadze 79'	Stadium: TDTU; Attendance: Behind closed doors Referee: Ilgiz Tantashev

21 August 2020 3	Lokomotiv	1–2	Kokand 1912	Tashkent
UZT (UTC+5)	Abduxoliqov 75'	Report (in Uzbek)	Rajevac 45+1'; Norbekov 90+1'	Stadium: Lokomotiv; Attendance: Behind closed doors Referee: Jasur Muxtorov

21 August 2020 4	Paxtakor	4–1	Nasaf	Tashkent
UZT (UTC+5)	Ćeran 32', 53', 67'; Sergeev 65'	Report (in Uzbek)	Aʼzamov 68'	Stadium: Bunyodkor; Attendance: Behind closed doors Referee: Ahrol Risqullayev

22 August 2020 5	Buxoro	1–0	Surxon	Bekabad
UZT (UTC+5)	Gʻofurov 32'	Report (in Uzbek)		Stadium: Metallurg; Attendance: Behind closed doors Referee: Ravshan Abduvohidov

22 August 2020 6	Navbahor	0–1	Mashʼal	Tashkent
UZT (UTC+5)		Report (in Uzbek)	Shukrillayev 29'	Stadium: Jar; Attendance: Behind closed doors Referee: Vadim Agishev

22 August 2020 7	Metallurg	1–1	Qizilqum	Tashkent
UZT (UTC+5)	Toshpoʻlatov 90+4'	Report (in Uzbek)	Qilichev 7'	Stadium: Paxtakor; Attendance: Behind closed doors Referee: Rahimbek Karimov

=== Round 12 ===
24 August 2020 1	Kokand 1912	2–1	Andijon	Qoʻqon
UZT (UTC+5)	Josović 18'; Xolmuhammedov 90'	Report (in Uzbek)	Hasanov 63'	Stadium: Qoʻqon; Attendance: Behind closed doors Referee: Ahrol Risqullayev

24 August 2020 2	Paxtakor	7–0	Lokomotiv	Tashkent
UZT (UTC+5)	Ćeran 12'; Sergeev 13', 28'; Hamdamov 31'; Derdiyok 47', 63'; Masharipov 50'	Report (in Uzbek)		Stadium: Paxtakor; Attendance: Behind closed doors Referee: Vadim Agishev

24 August 2020 3	Nasaf	2–2	Bunyodkor	Tashkent
UZT (UTC+5)	Norchayev 20'; Abduholiqov 57'	Report (in Uzbek)	Izzatov 67'; Erkinov 85'	Stadium: Bunyodkor; Attendance: Behind closed doors Referee: Asker Najafaliyev

25 August 2020 4	Qizilqum	1–1	Sogdiana	Navoiy
UZT (UTC+5)	Tomiva 30'	Report (in Uzbek)	Kolakovic 53'	Stadium: Youth; Attendance: Behind closed doors Referee: Ilgiz Tantashev

25 August 2020 5	AGMK	1–1	Navbahor	Navoiy
UZT (UTC+5)	Đokić 90+2'	Report (in Uzbek)	Turgʻunboyev 22'	Stadium: Youth; Attendance: Behind closed doors Referee: Temurbek Toʻxtasinov

25 August 2020 6	Surxon	1–2	Metallurg	Termiz
UZT (UTC+5)	Kasyan 40'	Report (in Uzbek)	Toshpoʻlatov 90+2', 90+3'	Stadium: Alpomish; Attendance: Behind closed doors Referee: Shavkat Nasibullayev

26 August 2020 7	Mashʼal	0–0	Buxoro	Muborak
UZT (UTC+5)		Report (in Uzbek)		Stadium: Bahrom Vafoyev; Attendance: Behind closed doors Referee: Zokir Qodirov

=== Round 13 ===
20 August 2020 1	Bunyodkor	1–1	Qizilqum	Tashkent
UZT (UTC+5)	Gʻiyosov 31'	Report (in Uzbek)	Margiyev 80'	Stadium: Bunyodkor; Attendance: Behind closed doors Referee: Firdavs Norsafarov

27 August 2020 2	Lokomotiv	0–4	Nasaf	Tashkent
UZT (UTC+5)		Report (in Uzbek)	Abduholiqov 10'; Muhiddinov 26'; Bozorov 63'; Kenjaboyev 81'	Stadium: Jar; Attendance: Behind closed doors Referee: Rustam Lutfullin

27 August 2020 3	Andijon	0–2	Paxtakor	Andijon
UZT (UTC+5)		Report (in Uzbek)	Sergeev 19'; Ćeran 42'	Stadium: Bobur; Attendance: Behind closed doors Referee: Rahimbek Karimov

28 August 2020 4	Navbahor	0–1	Kokand 1912	Namangan
UZT (UTC+5)		Report (in Uzbek)	Xolmuhammedov 90+3'	Stadium: Navbahor; Attendance: Behind closed doors Referee: Viktor Serazitdinov

28 August 2020 5	Sogdiana	2–0	Surxon	Tashkent
UZT (UTC+5)	Norkhonov 38'; Hasanov 43'	Report (in Uzbek)		Stadium: Paxtakor; Attendance: Behind closed doors Referee: Temurbek Toʻxtasinov

29 August 2020 6	Metallurg	2–0	Mashʼal	Tashkent
UZT (UTC+5)	Bobojonov 5'; Qutiboyev 49'	Report (in Uzbek)		Stadium: Jar; Attendance: Behind closed doors Referee: Jasur Muxtorov

29 August 2020 7	Buxoro	2–2	AGMK	Tashkent
UZT (UTC+5)	Abdullayev 73'; Alijonov 89'	Report (in Uzbek)	Grigalashvili 36'; Nurmatov 90+4'	Stadium: Lokomotiv; Attendance: Behind closed doors Referee: Vadim Agishev

=== Round 14 ===
1 September 2020 1	Andijon	0–1	Lokomotiv	Andijon
UZT (UTC+5)		Report (in Uzbek)	Gʻulomov 89'	Stadium: Bobur; Attendance: Behind closed doors Referee: Shavkat Nasibullayev

1 September 2020 2	Navbahor	1–1	Paxtakor	Namangan
UZT (UTC+5)	Turgʻunboyev 73'	Report (in Uzbek)	Sergeev 12'	Stadium: Navbahor; Attendance: Behind closed doors Referee: Temurbek Toʻxtasinov

10 September 2020 3	Nasaf	4–0	Qizilqum	Qarshi
UZT (UTC+5)	Abduholiqov 3', 66'; Bozorov 33'; Komilov 90+1'	Report (in Uzbek)		Stadium: Qarshi; Attendance: Behind closed doors Referee: Jasur Muxtorov

11 September 2020 4	Sogdiana	0–1	Mashʼal	Zomin
UZT (UTC+5)		Report (in Uzbek)	Qoʻziyev 75'	Stadium: Zomin; Attendance: Behind closed doors Referee: Ahrol Risqullayev

11 September 2020 5	Buxoro	2–1	Kokand 1912	Muborak
UZT (UTC+5)	Hakimov 53', 90+3'	Report (in Uzbek)	Merzlyakov 59'	Stadium: Bahrom Vafoyev; Attendance: Behind closed doors Referee: Firdavs Norsafarov

12 September 2020 6	Metallurg	2–1	AGMK	Bekabad
UZT (UTC+5)	Hakimov 53', 90+3'	Report (in Uzbek)	Merzlyakov 59'	Stadium: Metallurg; Attendance: Behind closed doors Referee: Zokir Qodirov

12 September 2020 7	Bunyodkor	2–1	Surxon	Tashkent
UZT (UTC+5)	Yoʻldoshev 49'; Toʻxtasinov 51'	Report (in Uzbek)	Aliyev 75'	Stadium: Bunyodkor; Attendance: Behind closed doors Referee: Rahimbek Karimov

=== Round 15 ===
5 September 2020 1	Buxoro	0–4	Paxtakor	Tashkent
UZT (UTC+5)		Report (in Uzbek)	Sergeev 31'; Masharipov 35'; Komilov 76'; Ćeran 89'	Stadium: Lokomotiv; Attendance: Behind closed doors Referee: Ravshan Abduvohidov

15 September 2020 2	Andijon	0–1	Nasaf	Andijon
UZT (UTC+5)		Report (in Uzbek)	Abduholiqov 26'	Stadium: Bobur; Attendance: Behind closed doors Referee: Akobirxoʻja Shukurullayev

15 September 2020 3	Lokomotiv	1–0	Navbahor	Tashkent
UZT (UTC+5)	Oʻlmasaliyev 65'	Report (in Uzbek)		Stadium: Lokomotiv; Attendance: Behind closed doors Referee: Zokir Qodirov

15 September 2020 4	Mashʼal	1–2	Bunyodkor	Muborak
UZT (UTC+5)	Qoʻziyev 30'	Report (in Uzbek)	Gʻiyosov 4'; Toʻxtasinov 69'	Stadium: Bahrom Vafoyev; Attendance: Behind closed doors Referee: Temurbek Toʻxtasinov

16 September 2020 5	Kokand 1912	0–2	Metallurg	Qoʻqon
UZT (UTC+5)		Report (in Uzbek)	Toshqoʻziyev 48'; Ubaydullayev 75'	Attendance: Behind closed doors Referee: Rahimbek Karimov

17 September 2020 6	Surxon	0–0	Qizilqum	Termiz
UZT (UTC+5)		Report (in Uzbek)		Stadium: Alpomish; Attendance: Behind closed doors Referee: Ahrol Risqullayev

17 September 2020 7	AGMK	1–1	Sogdiana	Olmaliq
UZT (UTC+5)	Vatsadze 82'	Report (in Uzbek)	Qahramonov 47'	Stadium: OKMK; Attendance: Behind closed doors Referee: Asker Najafaliyev

=== Round 16 ===
8 September 2020 1	Metallurg	0–3	Paxtakor	Bekabad
UZT (UTC+5)		Report (in Uzbek)	Ćeran 21'; Siddiqov 45+3'; Sobirjonov 90+2'	Stadium: Metallurg; Attendance: Behind closed doors Referee: Rustam Lutfullin

20 September 2020 2	Buxoro	2–2	Lokomotiv	Muborak
UZT (UTC+5)	Amonov 27'; Saʼdullayev 59'	Report (in Uzbek)	Abduxoliqov 15'; Bikmayev 19'	Stadium: Bahrom Vafoyev; Attendance: Behind closed doors Referee: Akobirxoʻja Shukurullayev

20 September 2020 3	Navbahor	0–0	Andijon	Namangan
UZT (UTC+5)		Report (in Uzbek)		Stadium: Navbahor; Attendance: Behind closed doors Referee: Ahrol Risqullayev

21 September 2020 4	Sogdiana	3–0	Kokand 1912	Jizzax
UZT (UTC+5)	Joʻrabekov 5'; Kolaković 45'; Shayqulov 61'	Report (in Uzbek)		Stadium: Sogdiana; Attendance: Behind closed doors Referee: Temurbek Toʻxtasinov

21 September 2020 5	Nasaf	5–0	Surxon	Qarshi
UZT (UTC+5)	Kenjaboyev 17', 23'; Rahmatullayev 49'; Abduholiqov 84', 90'	Report (in Uzbek)		Stadium: Qarshi; Attendance: Behind closed doors Referee: Rustam Lutfullin

22 September 2020 6	Bunyodkor	2–2	AGMK	Tashkent
UZT (UTC+5)	Toʻxtasinov 35'; Gʻiyosov 57'	Report (in Uzbek)	Vatsadze 15'; Grigalashvili 48'	Stadium: Bunyodkor; Attendance: Behind closed doors Referee: Jasur Muxtorov

22 September 2020 7	Qizilqum	1–0	Mashʼal	Navoiy
UZT (UTC+5)	Shukrillayev 90+1' (o.g.)	Report (in Uzbek)		Stadium: Youth; Attendance: Behind closed doors Referee: Shavkat Nasibullayev

=== Round 17 ===
25 September 2020 1	Metallurg	2–2	Lokomotiv	Tashkent
UZT (UTC+5)	Toshpoʻlatov 52'; Ubaydullayev 86'	Report (in Uzbek)	Maxaradze 37'; Abduxoliqov 66'	Stadium: Lokomotiv; Attendance: Behind closed doors Referee: Ravshan Abduvohidov

25 September 2020 2	Andijon	2–1	Buxoro	Andijon
UZT (UTC+5)	Olimov 35'; Qosimov 53'	Report (in Uzbek)	Abdullayev 30'	Stadium: Bobur; Attendance: Behind closed doors Referee: Jasur Muxtorov

26 September 2020 3	AGMK	2–1	Qizilqum	Olmaliq
UZT (UTC+5)	Đokić 68'; Polvonov 53'	Report (in Uzbek)	Sanoyev 11'	Stadium: OKMK; Attendance: Behind closed doors Referee: Rustam Lutfullin

26 September 2020 4	Navbahor	0–0	Nasaf	Namangan
UZT (UTC+5)		Report (in Uzbek)		Stadium: Navbahor; Attendance: 2561; Referee: Temurbek Toʻxtasinov

27 September 2020 5	Kokand 1912	2–1	Bunyodkor	Qoʻqon
UZT (UTC+5)	Norbekov 12'; Malikjonov 27'	Report (in Uzbek)	Erkinov 6'	Stadium: Qoʻqon; Attendance: 200; Referee: Zokir Qodirov

27 September 2020 6	Mashʼal	0–1	Surxon	Muborak
UZT (UTC+5)		Report (in Uzbek)	Gʻofurov 83'	Stadium: Bahrom Vafoyev; Attendance: 263; Referee: Asker Najafaliyev

21 October 2020 7	Paxtakor	0–0	Sogdiana	Tashkent
UZT (UTC+5)		Report (in Uzbek)		Stadium: Paxtakor; Attendance: 847; Referee: Shavkat Nasibullayev

=== Round 18 ===
1 October 2020 1	Metallurg	1–1	Andijon	Bekabad
UZT (UTC+5)	Ubaydullayev 21'	Report (in Uzbek)	Abdumannopov 89'	Stadium: Metallurg; Attendance: 85; Referee: Zokir Qodirov

1 October 2020 2	Surxon	0–1	AGMK	Termiz
UZT (UTC+5)		Report (in Uzbek)	Stanojević 6' (o.g.)	Stadium: Alpomish; Attendance: Behind closed doors Referee: Akobirxoʻja Shukurullayev

1 October 2020 3	Buxoro	0–0	Navbahor	Muborak
UZT (UTC+5)		Report (in Uzbek)		Stadium: Bahrom Vafoyev; Attendance: 70; Referee: Asker Najafaliyev

2 October 2020 4	Sogdiana	2–1	Lokomotiv	Jizzax
UZT (UTC+5)	Boltaboyev 20'; Joʻrabekov 34'	Report (in Uzbek)	Turopov 64'	Stadium: Sogdiana; Attendance: Behind closed doors Referee: Jasur Muxtorov

2 October 2020 5	Nasaf	4–0	Mashʼal	Qarshi
UZT (UTC+5)	Kenjaboyev 11'; Norchayev 42'; Abduholiqov 53', 71'	Report (in Uzbek)		Stadium: Qarshi; Attendance: Behind closed doors Referee: Rahimbek Karimov

2 October 2020 6	Qizilqum	2–1	Kokand 1912	Navoiy
UZT (UTC+5)	Kasminin 79'; Hasanov 82'	Report (in Uzbek)	Tolmasov 75' (o.g.)	Stadium: Youth; Attendance: 67; Referee: Ravshan Abduvohidov

5 November 2020 7	Bunyodkor	3–2	Paxtakor	Tashkent
UZT (UTC+5)	Toʻxtasinov 5', 55'; Mirahmadov 81'	Report (in Uzbek)	Masharipov 26'; Abdullayev 80'	Stadium: Bunyodkor; Attendance: 1510; Referee: Ahrol Risqullayev

=== Round 19 ===
2 October 2020 1	Mashʼal	0–2	AGMK	Muborak
UZT (UTC+5)		Report (in Uzbek)	Gʻafurov 28'; Polvonov 86'	Stadium: Bahrom Vafoyev; Attendance: 60; Referee: Sherzod Qosimov

18 October 2020 2	Andijon	1–1	Sogdiana	Andijon
UZT (UTC+5)	Yoʻldoshev 5'	Report (in Uzbek)	Kolaković 75'	Stadium: Bobur; Attendance: 871; Referee: Viktor Serazitdinov

18 October 2020 3	Buxoro	0–0	Nasaf	Muborak
UZT (UTC+5)	Yoʻldoshev 5'	Report (in Uzbek)	Kolaković 75'	Stadium: Bahrom Vafoyev; Attendance: 258; Referee: Shavkat Nasibullayev

18 October 2020 4	Paxtakor	3–1	Qizilqum	Tashkent
UZT (UTC+5)	Derdiyok 17'; Sayfiyev 74'; Ismoilov 76'	Report (in Uzbek)	Qilichev 28'	Stadium: Paxtakor; Attendance: 432; Referee: Olim Toʻychiboyev

19 October 2020 5	Surxon	0–1	Kokand 1912	Termiz
UZT (UTC+5)		Report (in Uzbek)	Rajevac 11'	Stadium: Alpomish; Attendance: 75; Referee: Ilgiz Tantashev

19 October 2020 6	Lokomotiv	2–1	Bunyodkor	Tashkent
UZT (UTC+5)	Abduxoliqov 29'; Pogrebnyak 69'	Report (in Uzbek)	Toʻxtasinov 87'	Stadium: Lokomotiv; Attendance: 203; Referee: Firdavs Norsafarov

19 October 2020 7	Navbahor	1–1	Metallurg	Namangan
UZT (UTC+5)	Oʻrinboyev 13'	Report (in Uzbek)	Andreyev 31'	Stadium: Navbahor; Attendance: 902; Referee: Jasur Muxtorov

=== Round 20 ===
21 October 2020 1	Nasaf	2–0	AGMK	Qarshi
UZT (UTC+5)	Stanojević 41'; Bozorov 60'	Report (in Uzbek)		Stadium: Qarshi; Attendance: 998; Referee: Rahimbek Karimov

22 October 2020 2	Mashʼal	0–0	Kokand 1912	Muborak
UZT (UTC+5)		Report (in Uzbek)		Stadium: Bahrom Vafoyev; Attendance: 99; Referee: Jasur Muxtorov

23 October 2020 3	Bunyodkor	6–2	Andijon	Tashkent
UZT (UTC+5)	Qahramonov 3'; Yoʻldoshev 6'; Gʻiyosov 12'; Erkinov 48'; Toʻxtasinov 67'; Toʻrayev 77'	Report (in Uzbek)	Jumaboyev 9'; Abdumannopov 90'	Stadium: Bunyodkor; Attendance: 210; Referee: Akobirxoʻja Shukurullayev

24 October 2020 4	Metallurg	0–0	Buxoro	Bekabad
UZT (UTC+5)		Report (in Uzbek)		Stadium: Metallurg; Attendance: 445; Referee: Olim Toʻychiboyev

24 October 2020 5	Qizilqum	1–1	Lokomotiv	Navoiy
UZT (UTC+5)	Qilichev 78'	Report (in Uzbek)	Abduxoliqov 45'	Stadium: Youth; Attendance: 210; Referee: Ilgiz Tantashev

24 October 2020 6	Surxon	0–6	Paxtakor	Termiz
UZT (UTC+5)		Report (in Uzbek)	Derdiyok 41'; Ćeran 43'; Komilov 45+1'; Sergeev 53'; Masharipov 60'; Siddiqov 79'	Stadium: Surxon; Attendance: 138; Referee: Temurbek Toʻxtasinov

24 October 2020 7	Sogdiana	1–0	Navbahor	Jizzax
UZT (UTC+5)	Norkhonov 61'	Report (in Uzbek)		Stadium: Sogdiana; Attendance: 468; Referee: Ravshan Abduvohidov

=== Round 21 ===
26 October 2020 1	Kokand 1912	1–0	AGMK	Qoʻqon
UZT (UTC+5)	Xolmuhammedov 80'	Report (in Uzbek)		Stadium: Qoʻqon; Attendance: 669; Referee: Viktor Serazitdinov

26 October 2020 2	Metallurg	0–2	Nasaf	Bekabad
UZT (UTC+5)		Report (in Uzbek)	Abduholiqov 75'; Saitov 81'	Stadium: Metallurg; Attendance: 304; Referee: Asker Najafaliyev

27 October 2020 3	Andijon	0–0	Qizilqum	Andijon
UZT (UTC+5)		Report (in Uzbek)		Stadium: Bobur; Attendance: 982; Referee: Firdavs Norsafarov

27 October 2020 4	Metallurg	2–1	Nasaf	Namangan
UZT (UTC+5)	Turgʻunboyev 31'; Bolov 56'	Report (in Uzbek)	Gʻiyosov 45'	Stadium: Navbahor; Attendance: 1000; Referee: Zokir Qodirov

28 October 2020 5	Surxon	1–1	Lokomotiv	Termiz
UZT (UTC+5)	Kasyan 25'	Report (in Uzbek)	Maxaradze 44'	Stadium: Alpomish; Attendance: Behind closed doors Referee: Shavkat Nasibullayev

28 October 2020 6	Mashʼal	1–4	Paxtakor	Muborak
UZT (UTC+5)	Temirov 13'	Report (in Uzbek)	Ćeran 5'; Hamdamov 31'; Sergeev 74'; Xolmatov 90+3'	Stadium: Bahrom Vafoyev; Attendance: 565; Referee: Rahimbek Karimov

29 October 2020 7	Buxoro	2–5	Sogdiana	Muborak
UZT (UTC+5)	Neʼmatov 10'; Pirimov 34'	Report (in Uzbek)	Hasanov 11', 25'; Norkhonov 48', 65'; Nasimov 88'	Stadium: Bahrom Vafoyev; Attendance: 105; Referee: Ahrol Risqullayev

=== Round 22 ===
31 October 2020 1	Nasaf	1–0	Kokand 1912	Qarshi
UZT (UTC+5)	Abduholiqov 54'	Report (in Uzbek)		Stadium: Qarshi; Attendance: 960; Referee: Zokir Qodirov

1 November 2020 2	Surxon	1–0	Andijon	Termiz
UZT (UTC+5)	Hojiakbarov 77'	Report (in Uzbek)		Stadium: Surxon; Attendance: 83; Referee: Ravshan Abduvohidov

1 November 2020 3	AGMK	0–6	Paxtakor	Olmaliq
UZT (UTC+5)		Report (in Uzbek)	Masharipov 24'; Hamdamov 32', 71'; Sergeev 43'; Đokić 45+1' (o.g.); Ceran 60'	Stadium: OKMK; Attendance: 789; Referee: Vadim Agishev

2 November 2020 4	Mashʼal	0–0	Lokomotiv	Muborak
UZT (UTC+5)		Report (in Uzbek)		Stadium: Bahrom Vafoyev; Attendance: 351; Referee: Elyor Tursunov

2 November 2020 5	Bunyodkor	1–1	Buxoro	Tashkent
UZT (UTC+5)	Erkinov 1'	Report (in Uzbek)	Abdullayev 90+2'	Stadium: Bunyodkor; Attendance: 56; Referee: Ahrol Risqullayev

2 November 2020 6	Qizilqum	0–2	Navbahor	Navoiy
UZT (UTC+5)		Report (in Uzbek)	Turgʻunboyev 36', 62'	Stadium: Youth; Referee: Asker Najafaliyev

3 November 2020 7	Sogdiana	0–0	Metallurg	Jizzax
UZT (UTC+5)		Report (in Uzbek)		Stadium: Sogdiana; Attendance: 645; Referee: Ilgiz Tantashev

=== Round 23 ===
19 November 2020 1	Andijon	2–1	Mashʼal	Andijon
UZT (UTC+5)	Avilov 2'; Bahodirov 88'	Report (in Uzbek)	Qoʻziyev 4'	Stadium: Bobur; Attendance: 783; Referee: Ahrol Risqullayev

19 November 2020 2	Buxoro	1–1	Qizilqum	Muborak
UZT (UTC+5)	Saʼdullayev 2'	Report (in Uzbek)	Shodiyev 22'	Stadium: Bahrom Vafoyev; Attendance: 138; Referee: Shavkat Nasibullayev

19 November 2020 3	Lokomotiv	2–1	AGMK	Tashkent
UZT (UTC+5)	Bikmayev 77', 90+3'	Report (in Uzbek)	Grigalashvili 45'	Stadium: Lokomotiv; Attendance: 86; Referee: Firdavs Norsafarov

20 November 2020 4	Metallurg	2–3	Bunyodkor	Bekabad
UZT (UTC+5)	Ubaydullayev 86'; Abdullayev 90+1'	Report (in Uzbek)	Gʻiyosov 5'; Mirahmadov 22', 65'	Stadium: Metallurg; Attendance: 188; Referee: Viktor Serazitdinov

20 November 2020 5	Sogdiana	3–1	Nasaf	Jizzax
UZT (UTC+5)	Norkhonov 7'; Qahramonov 61'; Nasimov 90+4'	Report (in Uzbek)	Abduholiqov 25'	Stadium: Sogdiana; Attendance: 196; Referee: Akobirxoʻja Shukurullayev

20 November 2020 6	Navbahor	1–0	Surxon	Namangan
UZT (UTC+5)	Ahmedov 44'	Report (in Uzbek)		Stadium: Navbahor; Attendance: 882; Referee: Rahimbek Karimov

20 November 2020 7	Paxtakor	2–1	Kokand 1912	Tashkent
UZT (UTC+5)	Hamdamov 6'; Ćeran 81'	Report (in Uzbek)	Xolmuhammedov 85'	Stadium: Paxtakor; Attendance: 356; Referee: Vadim Agishev

=== Round 24 ===
24 November 2020 1	Mashʼal	3–0	Navbahor	Muborak
UZT (UTC+5)	Abduraimov 56'; Murtozoyev 60'; Okoro Ibe 69'	Report (in Uzbek)		Stadium: Bahrom Vafoyev; Attendance: 202; Referee: Rustam Lutfullin

24 November 2020 2	AGMK	4–0	Andijon	Olmaliq
UZT (UTC+5)	Abdurahimov 24'; Yoʻldashov 26', 67'; Vatsadze 42'	Report (in Uzbek)		Stadium: OKMK; Attendance: 97; Referee: Rahimbek Karimov

24 November 2020 3	Qizilqum	1–0	Metallurg	Navoiy
UZT (UTC+5)	Qilichev 35'	Report (in Uzbek)		Stadium: Youth; Attendance: 135; Referee: Elyor Tursunov

25 November 2020 4	Nasaf	3–0	Paxtakor	Qarshi
UZT (UTC+5)	Muhiddinov 6'; Stanojević 56'; Mozgovoy 67'	Report (in Uzbek)		Stadium: Qarshi; Attendance: 1375; Referee: Shavkat Nasibullayev

25 November 2020 5	Kokand 1912	0–1	Lokomotiv	Bekabad
UZT (UTC+5)		Report (in Uzbek)	Alijonov 9'	Stadium: Metallurg; Attendance: 900; Referee: Ahrol Risqullayev

25 November 2020 6	Surxon	1–1	Buxoro	Bekabad
UZT (UTC+5)	Kasyan 70'	Report (in Uzbek)	Jumanqoʻziyev 90+4'	Stadium: Metallurg; Attendance: 334; Referee: Zokir Qodirov

25 November 2020 7	Bunyodkor	1–0	Sogdiana	Tashkent
UZT (UTC+5)	Gʻiyosov 64'	Report (in Uzbek)		Stadium: Bunyodkor; Attendance: 573; Referee: Firdavs Norsafarov

=== Round 25 ===
29 November 2020 1	Buxoro	1–3	Mashʼal	Qarshi
UZT (UTC+5)	Gʻiyosov 79'	Report (in Uzbek)	Murtozoyev 47'; Okoro Ibe 56'; Abduraimov 73'	Stadium: Qarshi; Attendance: 157; Referee: Akobirxoʻja Shukurullayev

29 November 2020 2	Metallurg	1–0	Surxon	Bekabad
UZT (UTC+5)	Ubaydullayev 84'	Report (in Uzbek)		Stadium: Metallurg; Attendance: 254; Referee: Rustam Lutfullin

29 November 2020 3	Andijon	1–0	Kokand 1912	Andijon
UZT (UTC+5)		Report (in Uzbek)	Xolmuhammedov 74'	Stadium: Bobur; Attendance: 456; Referee: Vadim Agishev

29 November 2020 4	Sogdiana	1–1	Qizilqum	Jizzax
UZT (UTC+5)	Boltaboyev 48'	Report (in Uzbek)	Qilichev 90+6'	Stadium: Sogdiana; Attendance: 1987; Referee: Rahimbek Karimov

29 November 2020 5	Navbahor	0–0	AGMK	Namangan
UZT (UTC+5)		Report (in Uzbek)		Stadium: Navbahor; Attendance: 982; Referee: Ahrol Risqullayev

29 November 2020 6	Bunyodkor	0–1	Nasaf	Tashkent
UZT (UTC+5)		Report (in Uzbek)	Stanojević 18'	Stadium: Bunyodkor; Attendance: 659; Referee: Zokir Qodirov

29 November 2020 7	Lokomotiv	0–1	Paxtakor	Tashkent
UZT (UTC+5)		Report (in Uzbek)	Sergeev 38'	Stadium: Paxtakor; Attendance: 5789; Referee: Viktor Serazitdinov

=== Round 26 ===
3 December 2020 1	Paxtakor	2–0	Andijon	Tashkent
UZT (UTC+5)	Ćeran 32'; Siddiqov 33'	Report (in Uzbek)		Stadium: Paxtakor; Attendance: 1897; Referee: Zokir Qodirov

3 December 2020 2	AGMK	3–1	Buxoro	Olmaliq
UZT (UTC+5)	Gʻofurov 42', 57'; Grigalashvili 88'	Report (in Uzbek)	Ibragimov 15'	Stadium: OKMK; Attendance: 324; Referee: Viktor Serazitdinov

3 December 2020 3	Surxon	1–2	Sogdiana	Termiz
UZT (UTC+5)	Kasyan 58'	Report (in Uzbek)	Rashidov 8'; Norkhonov 80'	Stadium: Surxon; Attendance: 972; Referee: Vadim Agishev

3 December 2020 4	Qizilqum	1–1	Bunyodkor	Navoiy
UZT (UTC+5)	Azimov 76'	Report (in Uzbek)	Qodirqulov 29'	Stadium: Youth; Attendance: 500; Referee: Ahrol Risqullayev

3 December 2020 5	Kokand 1912	1–1	Navbahor	Qoʻqon
UZT (UTC+5)	Roʻziyev 75'	Report (in Uzbek)	Ahmedov 73'	Stadium: Qoʻqon; Attendance: 960; Referee: Ahrol Risqullayev

3 December 2020 6	Mashʼal	1–1	Metallurg	Muborak
UZT (UTC+5)	Murtozayev 7'	Report (in Uzbek)	Abduraimov 11'	Stadium: Bahrom Vafoyev; Attendance: 268; Referee: Abdurashid Xudoyberganov

3 December 2020 7	Nasaf	0–0	Lokomotiv	Qarshi
UZT (UTC+5)		Report (in Uzbek)		Stadium: Qarshi; Attendance: 268; Referee: Rahimbek Karimov

== Positions by round ==
Team ╲ Round	1	2	3	4	5	6	7	8	9	10	11	12	13	14	15	16	17	18	19	20	21	22	23	24	25	26
Pakhtakor Tashkent	5	1	1	2	1	1	1	1	1	1	1	1	1	1	1	1	1	1	1	1	1	1	1	1	1	1
Nasaf Qarshi	4	2	2	1	2	4	7	5	5	4	5	5	4	3	4	3	3	3			3	3	2	2	2	2
AGMK	7	10	6	4	3	2	2	2	2	2	2	2	2	2	2	2	2	2			2	2	3	3	3	3
Bunyodkor	3	3	5	3	6	3	6	3	3	3	3	4	5	5	3	4	4	5				5	4	4	4	4
Kokand 1912	2	6	3	6	5	5	3	4	7	7	4	3	3	4	6	6	6	6				4	5	5	5	5
Sogdiana Jizzakh	14	11	13	11	8	8	9	9	9	9	10	9	9	9	10	9	9	8			7	7	6	6	7	6
Metallurg Bekabad	8	4	9	5	4	7	5	7	6	6	8	7	6	6	5	5	5	4			4	6	8	9	6	7
Navbahor Namangan	10	7	8	9	7	6	4	6	4	5	6	6	7	7	7	7	7	7			8	8	7	8	8	8
Lokomotiv Tashkent	6	9	4	7	10	10	8	8	8	8	9	10	10	10	9	8	8	9			9	9	9	7	9	9
Mash'al Mubarek	1	5	7	8	9	9	10	10	10	10	7	8	8	8	8	10	10	10			10	10	10	10	10	10
Qizilqum Zarafshon	12	13	12	13	13	14	14	13	14	13	12	11	11	11	11	11	11	11			11	11	11	11	11	11
Surkhon Termez	11	8	10	10	11	11	12	12	11	11	11	12	12	12	12	12	12	12			13	12	13	12	12	12
Andijon	9	12	11	12	12	12	11	11	12	12	13	13	14	14	14	13	13	13			12	13	12	13	13	13
Buxoro	13	14	14	14	14	13	13	14	13	14	14	14	13	13	13	13	14	14			14	14	14	14	14	14

Leader and qualification to AFC Champions League group stage
Qualification to AFC Cup group stage
Standby team of the AFC Cup group stage
Relegation to Uzbekistan Pro League#Relegation play off
Relegation to Uzbekistan Pro League

Source: Uzbekistan Professional Football League

== Results ==
Home \ Away	AGM	AND	BUK	BUN	KOK	LOK	MAS	MET	NAS	NAV	PAK	QIZ	SOG	SUR
AGMK	—	4–0	3–1	2–0	2–1	3–1	1–0	1–1	2–1	1–1	0–6	2–1	1–1	1–0
Andijon	1–3	—	2–1	0–0	0–1	0–1	2–1	0–2	0–1	0–0	0–2	0–0	1–1	0–1
Bukhoro	2–2	2–2	—	1–1	2–2	1–3	1–3	1–4	0–0	0–0	0–4	1–1	2–5	1–0
Bunyodkor	2–3	6–2	1–1	—	1–0	2–0	1–0	2–0	0–1	3–1	3–2	1–1	1–0	2–1
Kokand	1–0	2–1	3–0	2–1	—	0–1	2–0	0–2	2–2	1–1	1–3	4–0	2–1	3–0
Lokomotiv	2–1	2–1	3–0	2–1	1–2	—	0–1	0–3	0–4	1–0	0–1	3–0	1–2	2–1
Mash'al	0–2	0–0	1–0	1–2	1–2	0–0	—	1–0	0–0	3–0	1–4	1–2	3–0	0–1
Metallurg	1–0	1–1	0–0	2–3	1–0	2–2	2–1	—	0–2	1–3	0–3	1–2	2–0	1–0
Nasaf	2–0	2–1	0–0	2–2	1–0	0–0	4–1	1–0	—	2–2	3–0	4–0	3–0	5–0
Navbahor	0–0	0–0	2–0	2–1	0–1	2–0	0–1	1–1	0–0	—	1–1	1–0	2–0	1–0
Pakhtakor	2–2	2–0	3–0	5–0	2–1	7–0	3–0	4–1	4–1	2–1	—	3–1	2–0	3–1
Qizilqum	0–1	1–1	1–0	1–1	2–1	1–1	1–0	1–0	1–3	0–2	0–2	—	1–1	1–2
Sogdiana	1–1	1–1	3–1	3–3	3–0	2–1	0–1	0–0	3–1	1–0	1–0	1–1	—	2–0
Surkhon	0–1	1–0	1–1	1–3	0–1	1–1	2–2	1–2	1–2	1–1	0–6	0–0	1–2	—

Source: Uzbekistan Professional Football League
Legend: Blue = home team win; Yellow = draw; Red = away team win.

=== Results by match played ===
Team ╲ Round	1	2	3	4	5	6	7	8	9	10	11	12	13	14	15	16	17	18	19	20	21	22	23	24	25	26
AGMK	D	D	W	W	W	W	W	W	D	W	W	D	D	L	D	W	W	W	W	L	L	L	L	W	D	W
Andijon	L	L	D	D	L	D	D	D	L	D	L	L	L	L	L	D	W	D	D	L	D	L	W	L	L	L
Bukhoro	L	L	L	D	L	D	L	L	D	L	W	L	D	D	L	L	L	D	D	D	L	D	D	D	L	L
Bunyodkor	W	W	L	W	L	W	D	W	D	W	D	D	D	W	W	L	L	W	L	W	L	D	W	W	L	D
Kokand	W	L	W	L	W	W	W	L	D	L	W	W	W	D	L	L	W	L	W	W	W	L	L	L	W	D
Lokomotiv	W	L	W	L	L	L	W	W	L	L	L	L	L	W	W	W	D	L	W	D	D	D	W	W	L	D
Mash'al	W	L	D	D	D	L	L	L	W	D	W	W	L	W	L	L	L	L	L	L	L	D	L	W	W	W
Metallurg	D	W	L	W	W	L	W	L	W	L	L	W	W	W	W	L	D	D	D	D	L	D	L	L	W	L
Nasaf	W	W	W	D	D	D	L	W	D	W	L	D	W	W	W	W	D	W	D	W	W	W	L	W	W	D
Navbahor	L	W	D	D	W	W	W	L	W	D	L	D	L	D	L	D	D	D	D	L	W	W	W	L	D	D
Pakhtakor	W	W	W	L	W	W	W	W	D	W	W	W	W	D	W	W	W	L	W	W	W	W	W	L	W	W
Qizilqum	L	L	D	L	L	L	L	D	L	W	W	D	D	L	D	W	L	W	L	D	D	L	D	W	D	D
Sogdiana	L	D	L	W	W	D	L	W	L	L	D	D	W	L	D	W	L	W	D	W	W	D	W	L	D	W
Surkhon	L	W	L	D	L	L	L	L	W	D	L	L	L	L	D	L	W	L	L	L	D	W	L	D	L	L

Source: Championat.asia
W = Win; D = Draw; L = Loss

=== 2020 Uzbekistan U19 Championship under Super League results ===
Uzbekistan U19 Championship
- Season: 2020
- Champions: Nasaf U19
- Matches: 91
- Goals: 379 (4.16 per match)
- Top goalscorer: Botir Irismetov (10)
- Biggest home win: Lokomotiv U19 8:0 Sogdiana U19 (07 October 2020)
- Biggest away win: AGMK U19 0:7 Lokomotiv U19 (10 November 2020)
- Highest scoring: Lokomotiv U19 8:0 Sogdiana U19 (07 October 2020)
- Highest attendance: 276 (12 March 2020, Kokand 1912 U19 2:0 Sogdiana U19)

#	Team	Game	Win	Draw	Loss	Goals ratio	Points
1	Nasaf U19	13	10	1	2	26-12	31
2	Navbahor U19	13	10	0	3	32-23	30
3	Lokomotiv U19	13	9	1	3	35-17	28
4	Bunyodkor U19	13	7	3	3	34-16	24
5	Buxoro U19	13	7	3	3	27-18	24
6	Paxtakor U19	13	7	1	5	30-17	22
7	Metallurg U19	13	6	2	5	28-22	20
8	AGMK U19	13	4	2	7	15-30	14
9	Andijon U19	13	3	4	6	15-32	13
10	Mashʼal U19	13	3	3	7	16-7	12
11	Surxon U19	13	3	2	8	16-31	11
12	Qoʻqon-1912 U19	13	3	2	8	20-35	11
13	Qizilqum U19	13	3	2	8	13-25	11
14	Soʻgʻdiyona U19	13	2	2	9	12-34	8

=== 2020 Uzbekistan U21 Championship under Super League results ===
Uzbekistan U21 Championship
- Season: 2020
- Champions: Metallurg
- Matches: 182
- Goals: 537 (2.95 per match)
- Top goalscorer: Kamronbek Abdulhamidov (18)
- Biggest home win: Nasaf U21 6:1 Qizilqum U21 (09 September 2020)
- Biggest away win: Andijon U21 1:6 OKMK U21 (20 August 2020)
- Highest scoring: Paxtakor U21 5:3 Lokomotiv U21 (23 August 2020)
- Highest attendance: 1450 (29 February 2020, Surxon U21 2:1 Bunyodkor U21)

#	Team	Game	Win	Draw	Loss	Goals ratio	Points
1	Metallurg U21	26	19	5	2	49-16	62
2	Paxtakor U21	26	17	6	3	52-20	57
3	Nasaf U21	26	17	1	8	53-33	52
4	Navbahor U21	26	13	7	6	49-42	46
5	AGMK U21	26	12	4	10	46-35	40
6	Lokomotiv U21	26	8	10	8	33-32	34
7	Qizilqum U21	26	9	7	10	32-48	34
8	Bunyodkor U21	26	8	8	10	37-39	32
9	Buxoro U21	26	7	10	9	35-30	31
10	Andijon U21	26	7	7	12	30-45	28
11	Surxon U21	26	6	7	13	25-45	25
12	Soʻgʻdiyona U21	26	7	3	16	38-46	24
13	Mashʼal U21	26	4	9	13	29-48	21
14	Qoʻqon-1912 U21	26	4	4	18	22-51	16

== Season Statistics ==
- First goal of the season: Ivan Solovyov for Navbahor against Pakhtakor (27 February 2020)

Pakhtakor's Dragan Ćeran won the Super League Golden Boot after scoring 21 goals, a record for a 26-game Super League season

=== Goalscorers ===
As of 3 December 2020

#	Player	Club	Goals
1	(Serbia) Dragan Ćeran	Pakhtakor Tashkent	20
2	(Uzbekistan) Bobur Abdikholikov	Nasaf	17
3	(Uzbekistan) Igor Segeev	Pakhtakor Tashkent	16
4	(Uzbekistan) Murod Kholmukhamedov	Kokand 1912	12
4	(Uzbekistan) Shokhruz Norkhonov	Sogdiana Jizzakh	12
6	(Uzbekistan) Nurillo Tukhtasinov	Bunyodkor	11
7	(Switzerland) Eren Derdiyok	Pakhtakor Tashkent	9
7	(Uzbekistan) Dostonbek Khamdamov	Pakhtakor Tashkent	9
9	(Uzbekistan) Shakhzod Ubaydullaev	Metallurg Bekabad	8
9	(Uzbekistan) Azizbek Turgunboev	Navbahor Namangan	8
9	(Uzbekistan) Khursid Giyosov	Bunyodkor	8
9	(Ukraine) Oleksandr Kasyan	Surkhon Termez	8
13	(Georgia (country)) Elgujja Grigalashvili	AGMK	7
14	(Uzbekistan) Jaloliddin Masharipov	Pakhtakor Tashkent	6
14	(Uzbekistan) Jamshed Khasanov	Andijon/Qizilqum	6
14	(Uzbekistan) Stanislav Andreev	Metallurg Bekabad	6
14	(Serbia) Marko Stanojević	Nasaf	6
14	(Uzbekistan) Temurkhuja Abdukholiqov	Lokomotiv Tashkent	6
14	(Uzbekistan) Marat Bikmaev	Lokomotiv Tashkent	6
14	(Uzbekistan) Khumoyun Murtozoyev	Mash'al Mubarek	6
14	(Uzbekistan) Shakhboz Erkinov	Bunyodkor	6

=== Hat-tricks ===
Player	For	Against	Result	Date
(Serbia) Dragan Ćeran	Pakhtakor	Buxoro	3–0 (H)	8 March 2020
(Serbia) Dragan Ćeran	Pakhtakor	Nasaf	4–1 (H)	21 August 2020

=== Top assists ===
As of 3 December 2020

#	Player	Club	Assists
1	(Uzbekistan) Jaloliddin Masharipov	Pakhtakor Tashkent	14
2	(Serbia) Dragan Ćeran	Pakhtakor Tashkent	8
3	(Uzbekistan) Jasur Hasanov	Sogdiana Jizzakh	7
4	(Uzbekistan) Sherzod Karimov	Surkhon Termez	6
4	(Uzbekistan) Sanjar Kodirkulov	Bunyodkor	6
4	(Uzbekistan) Murod Toshmatov	AGMK	6

=== Disciplinary ===
As of 25 August 2020

#	Player	Club	Sent off (straight red)	Booked
1	(Uzbekistan) Islombek Isoqjonov	Navbahor	2	1
2	(Uzbekistan) Egor Krimets	Pakhtakor	1	4
3	(Nigeria) Emmanuel Ariwachukwu	Andijon	1	3
4	(Russia) Ruslan Margiev	Qizilqum	1	2
5	(Serbia) Jovan Đokić	AGMK	1	2
6	(Uzbekistan) Ivan Nagaev	Sogdiana	1	2
7	(Russia) Andrei Shipilov	Metallurg	1	1
8	(Uzbekistan) Nurillo Tukhtasinov	Bunyodkor	1	1
9	(Uzbekistan) Shavkat Mullajanov	Sogdiana	1	–
10	(Uzbekistan) Shavkat Salomov	Surkhon	1	–
11	(Montenegro) Slavko Damjanović	Lokomotiv	1	–
12	(Uzbekistan) Zokhid Abdullaev	Metallurg	–	4
13	(Ukraine) Oleksandr Kasyan	Surkhon	–	4
14	(Nigeria) Ifeanyi Ifeanyi	Mash'al	–	4
15	(Uzbekistan) Davron Khashimov	Lokomotiv	–	3
16	(Uzbekistan) Azizbek Turgunbaev	Navbahor	–	3
17	(Uzbekistan) Qadamboy Nurmetov	Qizilqum	–	3
18	(Uzbekistan) Temur Usmonov	Andijon	–	3
19	(Uzbekistan) Sardor Kulmatov	Sogdiana	–	3
20	(Russia) Ivan Solovyov	Navbahor	–	3
21	(Uzbekistan) Lutfulla Turaev	Bunyodkor	–	3
22	(Ivory Coast) Yacouba Bamba	Kokand 1912	–	3

== Attendances ==
=== By round ===
2020 Uzbekistan Super League Attendance
Round	Total	GP.	Avg. Per Game
Round 1	38,607	7	5,515
Round 2	52,130	7	7,447
Round 3	38,021	7	5,431
Round 4	0	7	0 (Note: Matches from 14 June and onwards will be played behind closed doors.)
Round 5	0	7	0
Round 6	0	7	0
Round 7	0	7	0
Round 8	0	7	0
Round 9	0	7	0
Round 10	0	7	0
Round 11	0	7	0
Round 12	0	7	0
Round 13	0	7	0
Total	128,758	21	6,131

=== By team ===
Pos	Team	Total	High	Low	Average	Change
1	Pakhtakor	27,387	15,320	5,324	9,129	+21.4%
2	Kokand	9,479	5,178	4,301	4,739	+19.7%
3	Surkhon	9,543	5,623	3,920	4,771	−20.1%
4	Qizilqum	6,110	3,752	2,358	3,055	−30.7%
5	AGMK	6,927	3,727	3,200	3,463	+53.7%
6	Mash'al	6,431	3,520	2,911	3,215 ^{†}	n/a
7	Lokomotiv	4,720	3,210	1,510	2,360	+4.7%
8	Sogdiana	2,572				NA
9	Nasaf	8,473				NA
10	Bukhoro					NA
11	Andijon	15,152				NA
12	Metallurg	5,221				NA
13	Bunyodkor	1,465				NA
14	Navbahor	25,328				NA
	League total	128,758	25,328	1,465	6,131	+10.7%

Updated to games played on 2020
Notes:
^{†} Teams played previous season in Pro League.

== Awards ==
=== Monthly awards ===
Month	Manager of the Month		Player of the Month		Goalkeeper of the Month		Goal of the Month	
Month	Manager	Club	Player	Club	Player	Club	Player	Club
March	(Uzbekistan) Ruziqul Berdiev	Nasaf	(Serbia) Dragan Ćeran	Pakhtakor	(Uzbekistan) Eldorbek Suyunov	Pakhtakor	(Serbia) Dragan Ćeran	Pakhtakor
June	(Uzbekistan) Mirjalol Qosimov	AGMK	(Uzbekistan) Azizbek Turgunboev	Navbahor	(Uzbekistan) Sukhrob Sultonov	AGMK	(Uzbekistan) Shakhzod Ubaydullaev	Metallurg
July	(Uzbekistan) Mirjalol Qosimov	AGMK	(Uzbekistan) Murod Kholmukhamedov	Kokand 1912	–		(Uzbekistan) Sanjar Tursunov	AGMK
August	(Georgia (country)) Shota Arveladze	Pakhtakor	(Uzbekistan) Igor Sergeev	Pakhtakor	–		(Uzbekistan) Sherzod Karimov	Surkhon
September	(Uzbekistan) Ruziqul Berdiev	Nasaf	(Uzbekistan) Bobur Abdikholikov	Nasaf	–		(Uzbekistan) Abduloh Olimov	Andijon
October	(Georgia (country)) Shota Arveladze	Pakhtakor	(Uzbekistan) Bobur Abdikholikov	Nasaf	–		(Serbia) Marko Stanojević	Nasaf
November	(Uzbekistan) Ruziqul Berdiev	Nasaf	(Serbia) Marko Stanojević	Nasaf	–		(Serbia) Marko Stanojević	Nasaf

=== Annual awards ===
Annual awards
Award	Winner	Club
Superliga Player of the Season	(Uzbekistan) Jaloliddin Masharipov	Pakhtakor
Superliga Young Player of the Season	(Uzbekistan) Abduvohid Nematov	Nasaf
Superliga Goal of the Season	(Uzbekistan) Sanjar Tursunov	AGMK

=== Team of the Season ===
Team of the Season
Goalkeeper	(Uzbekistan) Abduvohid Nematov (Nasaf)			
Defenders	(Uzbekistan) Murod Kholmuhammedov (Kokand 1912)		(Uzbekistan) Egor Krimets (Pakhtakor)	(Uzbekistan) Farrukh Sayfiev (Pakhtakor)
Midfielders	(Uzbekistan) Nurillo Tokhtasinov (Bunyodkor)	(Montenegro) Marko Stanojević (Nasaf)	(Serbia) Dragan Ćeran (Pakhtakor)	(Uzbekistan) Murod Toshmatov (AGMK)
Forwards	(Uzbekistan) Aziz Turgunboyev (Navbahor)		(Uzbekistan) Bobur Abdikholikov (Nasaf)	(Uzbekistan) Jaloliddin Masharipov (Pakhtakor)

== Match ball ==
On 23 February 2020, Puma announced their official partnership with Uzbekistan Super League to manufacture the official match ball for the Uzbekistan Professional Football League Organization.

== See also ==
- 2020 Uzbekistan Pro League
- 2020 Uzbekistan Pro-B League
- 2020 Uzbekistan Second League
- 2020 Uzbekistan Cup
- 2020 Uzbekistan League Cup
