= Igor Golban =

Uzbek footballer (born 1990)

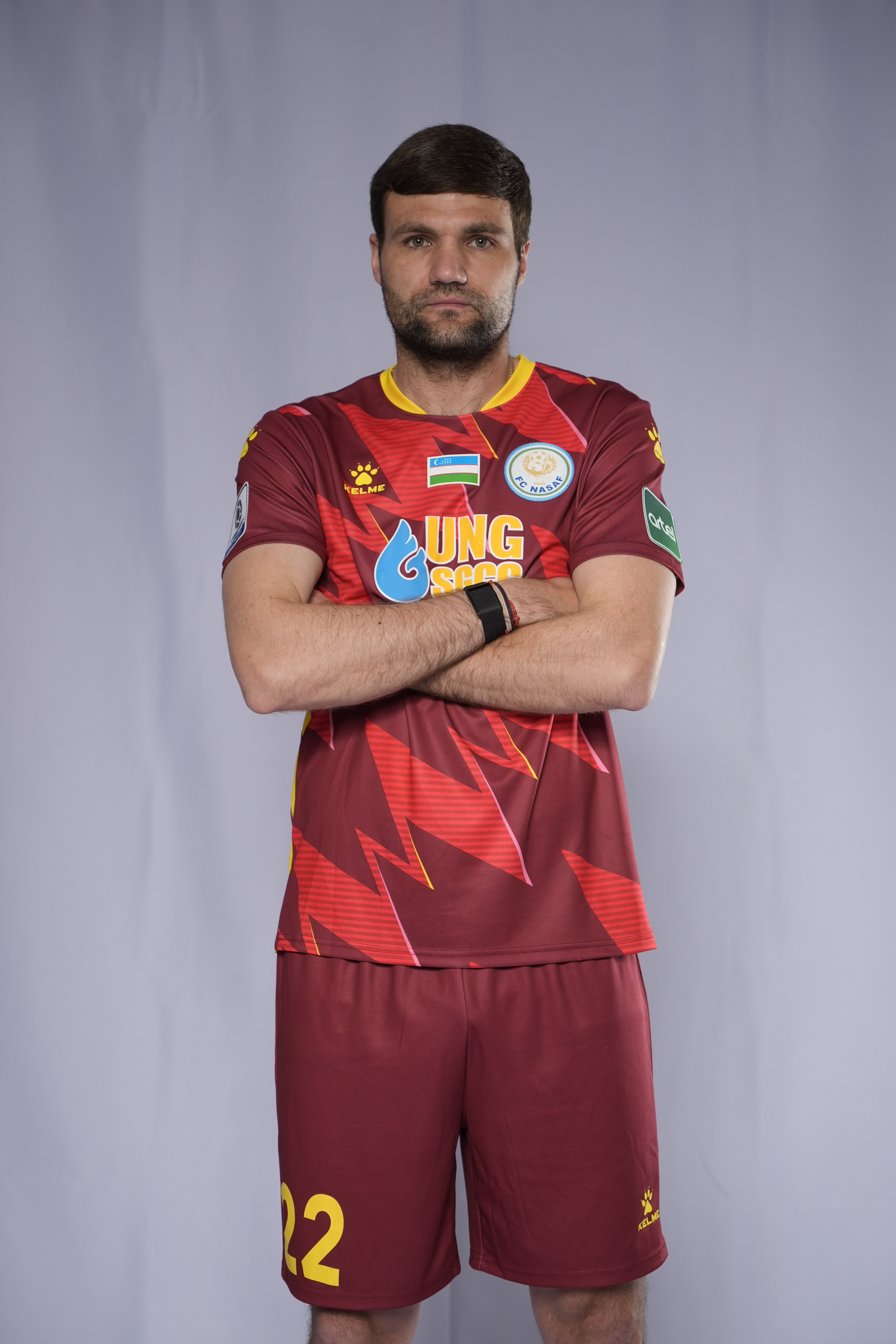

Personal information
- Full name: Igor Valeryevich Golban
- Date of birth: 31 July 1990 (age 36)
- Place of birth: Sochi, Soviet Union (now Russia)
- Height: 1.93 m (6 ft 4 in)
- Position: Defender

Team information
- Current team: Sogdiana
- Number: 18

Senior career*
Years	Team	Apps	(Gls)
2008	Sochi-04	21	(0)
2009–2011	Zhemchuzhina-Sochi	15	(1)
2011–2014	Lokomotiv Moscow	0	(0)
2012–2013	→ Sigma Olomouc (loan)	2	(0)
2013	→ Shinnik Yaroslavl (loan)	14	(0)
2014	→ Khimki (loan)	10	(2)
2014	Sochi	10	(1)
2014–2015	Kokand 1912	26	(1)
2016	Navbahor	14	(2)
2016–2018	Nasaf	55	(8)
2018–2024	Navbahor	135	(8)
2024–2025	Nasaf	48	(1)
2026	Andijon	6	(0)
2026–	Sogdiana	2	(0)

International career^{‡}
2009	Russia U19	8	(1)
2011	Russia U21	3	(0)
2020–2021	Uzbekistan	4	(0)
- * Club domestic league appearances and goals as of 6 August 2026 ‡ National team caps and goals as of 15 February 2021

Igor Valeryevich Golban (Russian: Игорь Валерьевич Голбан; born 31 July 1990) is a professional footballer who plays as a defender for Sogdiana in the Uzbekistan Super League. Born in Russia during the Soviet period, he represents Uzbekistan internationally.

== Career ==
He made his Russian Football National League debut for FC Zhemchuzhina-Sochi on 10 August 2010 in a game against FC Shinnik Yaroslavl. He played 3 seasons in the FNL for Zhemchuzhina and Shinnik.

In February 2015, he signed a contract with Kokand 1912.

== International career ==
On 6 March 2020, Golban was naturalized as an Uzbekistani citizen after spending 5 years in the country. He debuted for the Uzbekistan national football team in a friendly 2–1 loss to Iran on 8 October 2020.

== Career statistics ==
As of match played 30 November 2024

Appearances and goals by club, season and competition
Club	Season	League			National cup		Continental		Other		Total	
Club	Season	Division	Apps	Goals	Apps	Goals	Apps	Goals	Apps	Goals	Apps	Goals
FC Zhemchuzhina-Sochi	2010	Russian First Division	10	1	1	0	—		—		11	1
FC Zhemchuzhina-Sochi	2011–12	Russian Football National League	5	0	1	0	—		—		6	0
FC Zhemchuzhina-Sochi	Total		15	1	2	0	—		—		17	1
SK Sigma Olomouc (loan)	2012–13	Czech First League	2	0	0	0	—		1	0	3	0
FC Shinnik Yaroslavl (loan)	2013–14	Russian Football National League	14	0	1	0	—		—		15	0
FC Khimki (loan)	2013–14	Russian Professional Football League	10	2	—		—		—		10	2
FC Sochi	2014–15	Russian Professional Football League	16	1	2	0	—		—		18	1
Kokand 1912	2015	Uzbek League	26	1	1	0	—		—		27	1
Navbahor Namangan	2016	Uzbek League	14	2	1	0	—		—		15	2
Nasaf	2016	Uzbek League	14	3	4	2	—		—		18	5
Nasaf	2017	Uzbek League	27	3	6	0	2	1	—		35	4
Nasaf	2018	Uzbekistan Super League	14	2	1	0	7	2	—		22	4
Nasaf	Total		55	8	11	2	9	3	—		75	13
Navbahor Namangan	2018	Uzbekistan Super League	16	2	—		—		—		16	2
Navbahor Namangan	2019	Uzbekistan Super League	22	0	2	0	—		—		24	0
Navbahor Namangan	2020	Uzbekistan Super League	24	2	2	0	—		–		26	2
Navbahor Namangan	2021	Uzbekistan Super League	25	1	4	0	—		—		29	1
Navbahor Namangan	2022	Uzbekistan Super League	21	1	5	0	—		—		26	1
Navbahor Namangan	2023	Uzbekistan Super League	26	2	6	0	7	1	—		39	3
Navbahor Namangan	Total		134	8	19	0	7	1	—		160	9
Nasaf	2024	Uzbekistan Super League	21	0	1	0	7	0	0	0	29	0
Career total			307	23	38	2	23	4	1	0	369	29

=== International ===
Statistics accurate as of match played 15 February 2021.

Uzbekistan national team
Year	Apps	Goals
2020	1	0
2021	3	0
Total	4	0

== Honours ==
Sigma Olomouc

- Czech Republic Super Cup: 2012
