= Rajevac =

Rajevac (Serbian Cyrillic: Рајевац) is a surname. Notable people with the surname include:

- Filip Rajevac (born 1992), Serbian footballer
- Milovan Rajevac (born 1954), Serbian footballer and manager
