= Andrey Shipilov =

Uzbek football manager

Personal information
- Full name: Andrey Sergeyevich Shipilov
- Date of birth: 23 March 1971 (age 55)
- Place of birth: Tashkent, Uzbek SSR
- Height: 1.83 m (6 ft 0 in)
- Positions: Defender; midfielder

Senior career*
Years	Team	Apps	(Gls)
1990-1991	Sverdlovets	74	(0)
1992	Traktor Tashkent	13	(1)
1992	Chirchiq	12	(0)
1993	Navroʻz Andijon	27	(1)
1994	Guliston	2	(0)
1994	Torpedo Vladimir	8	(0)
1994-1996	Nosta Novotroitsk	44	(0)
1997-2000	Andijan	111	(9)
2001	Navbahor Namangan	3	(0)
2001-2002	Andijan	26	(0)
2003	Vidnoye	17	(1)
2003	Doʻstlik	2	(0)

Managerial career
- 2014-2017: Pakhtakor Tashkent
- 2018-2022: Metallurg Bekobod
- 2022: Dinamo Samarqand
- 2026-: Kokand 1912
- * Club domestic league appearances and goals

Andrey Sergeyevich Shipilov (Russian: Андрей Сергеевич Шипилов; born 23 March 1971) is an Uzbek and Russian former professional association football player who played as a defender and midfielder. After retiring as a player, he worked as a coach for several clubs. He is currently the head coach of Kokand 1912.

== Playing career ==
Shipilov began his career in 1990 with Tashkent Region's FC Sverdlovets. In 1992, he played for Traktor Tashkent and Chirchiq. In 1993, he represented Navroʻz Andijan.

In 1994, he played for Torpedo Vladimir, and later that year moved to Nosta Novotroitsk, where he remained until 1996. From 1997 to 1999, he played for Andijan. In 2001, Shipilov briefly played for Navbahor Namangan, before spending the following two seasons again with Andijan. In 2003, he played for Vidnoye in Russia, and later moved to Doʻstlik, where he finished his playing career.

== Coaching career ==
After retiring, Shipilov began his coaching career. Until mid-2017, he worked on the coaching staff of Pakhtakor Tashkent.

From 2018 to 2021, he served as head coach of Metallurg Bekobod. In 2022, he worked as sporting director of Dinamo Samarqand.

Since 2026, he has been the head coach of Kokand 1912.
