= Igor Sergeev =

Uzbek footballer (born 1993)

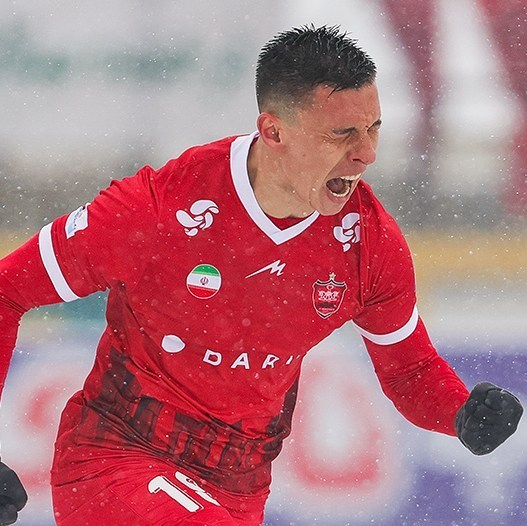
- Sergeev with Persepolis in 2026

Personal information
- Full name: Igor Vladimirovich Sergeev
- Date of birth: 30 April 1993 (age 33)
- Place of birth: Tashkent, Uzbekistan
- Height: 1.85 m (6 ft 1 in)
- Position: Forward

Team information
- Current team: Persepolis
- Number: 11

Senior career*
| Years | Team | Apps | (Gls) |
| 2011–2018 | Pakhtakor | 122 | (61) |
| 2016 | → Beijing Guoan (loan) | 14 | (1) |
| 2018 | Al Dhafra | 10 | (1) |
| 2018–2021 | Pakhtakor | 49 | (34) |
| 2021 | Aktobe | 18 | (7) |
| 2021–2023 | Tobol | 45 | (17) |
| 2023–2024 | BG Pathum United | 15 | (5) |
| 2025 | Pakhtakor | 29 | (20) |
| 2026– | Persepolis | 14 | (4) |

International career^{‡}
| 2011 | Uzbekistan U18 | 4 | (1) |
| 2012 | Uzbekistan U19 | 14 | (9) |
| 2013 | Uzbekistan U20 | 5 | (2) |
| 2014–2016 | Uzbekistan U23 | 7 | (3) |
| 2013– | Uzbekistan | 87 | (25) |
Medal record
Representing Uzbekistan
CAFA Nations Cup
| Winner | 2025 Tajikistan–Uzbekistan | Team |
- * Club domestic league appearances and goals as of 6 November 2026 ‡ National team caps and goals as of 28 June 2026

Igor Vladimirovich Sergeev (Russian: Игорь Владимирович Сергеев; born 30 April 1993) is an Uzbek professional footballer who plays as a forward for Persepolis in the Persian Gulf Pro League and the Uzbekistan national team.

== Club career ==
=== Pakhtakor ===
Sergeev made his Uzbek League debut for Pakhtakor Tashkent on 5 March 2011 against Qizilqum Zarafshon at the Pakhtakor Markaziy Stadium coming on as a 90th-minute substitute for Temurkhuja Abdukholikov as Tashkent won the match 2–0.

==== Beijing Guoan (loan) ====
On 6 July 2016, Sergeev was loaned to Chinese Super League club Beijing Guoan joining his national team teammate Egor Krimets. On 16 October, he received his first goal during 2016 season in the match against Changchun Yatai.

=== Return to Pakhtakor ===
On 6 July 2018, Sergeev returned to Pakhtakor Tashkent.

=== Aktobe ===
On 18 February 2021, FC Aktobe announced the signings of Sergeev.

=== Tobol ===
On 19 July 2021, Sergeev left Aktobe to sign for Tobol. On 29 July 2021, during a 2021–22 UEFA Europa Conference League 2nd qualifying round game, he scored a brace against Hajduk Split, becoming the first Uzbek to score in the UEFA Conference League. Though his countryman Eldor Shomurodov scored three weeks later, Sergeev remains at 28 years the oldest Uzbek goalscorer in the competition. On 8 June 2023, Sergeev left Tobol by mutual consent.

=== BG Pathum United ===
On 13 June 2023, BG Pathum United announced the signing of Sergeev.

=== Second Pakhtakor return ===
On 25 December 2024, Pakhtakor announced the return of Sergeev from BG Pathum United to a one-year contract.

=== Persepolis F.C. ===
On 4 January 2026 he went to Iran, accepting Persepolis' offer; he also had an offer from Sepahan.

== International career ==
Sergeev had established himself as a regular at the under-20 level for Uzbekistan. After the 2012 AFC U-19 Championship Sergeev came out as the top scorer of the tournament with 7 goals throughout as he led Uzbekistan's U20s to the semi-finals, where they lost to South Korea U20s 3–1.

He made his debut for main team, Uzbekistan on 10 September 2013 in 2014 FIFA World Cup qualification match against Jordan. He was named in Uzbekistan's squad for 2015 AFC Asian Cup, held in Australia. Sergeev played three matches and scored Uzbekistan's 1–0 winning goal against North Korea in their opening match in Group B. Sergeev performance with BG Pathum United earn him a call-up to the 2023 AFC Asian Cup held in Qatar.

On 2 June 2026, he was included in the 26-man squad selected by head coach Fabio Cannavaro for the 2026 FIFA World Cup, marking the country's first-ever appearance in the tournament.

== Career statistics ==
=== Club ===
As of match played 6 November 2026

Appearances and goals by club, season and competition
| Club | Season | League | | | National cup | | League cup | | Continental | | Other | | Total | |
| Club | Season | Division | Apps | Goals | Apps | Goals | Apps | Goals | Apps | Goals | Apps | Goals | Apps | Goals |
|---|---|---|---|---|---|---|---|---|---|---|---|---|---|---|
| Pakhtakor Tashkent | 2011 | Uzbekistan Super League | 2 | 0 | 0 | 0 | – | | 1 | 0 (Note: Appearance(s) in AFC Champions League) | – | | 3 | 0 |
| Pakhtakor Tashkent | 2012 | Uzbekistan Super League | 5 | 0 | 1 | 0 | – | | 0 | 0 | – | | 6 | 0 |
| Pakhtakor Tashkent | 2013 | Uzbekistan Super League | 20 | 4 | 2 | 0 | – | | 6 | 0 | – | | 28 | 4 |
| Pakhtakor Tashkent | 2014 | Uzbekistan Super League | 25 | 11 | 5 | 2 | – | | – | | – | | 30 | 13 |
| Pakhtakor Tashkent | 2015 | Uzbekistan Super League | 30 | 22 | 4 | 1 | – | | 6 | 3 | 1 | 0 | 41 | 26 |
| Pakhtakor Tashkent | 2016 | Uzbekistan Super League | 15 | 11 | 2 | 2 | – | | 6 | 5 | 1 | 0 | 24 | 18 |
| Pakhtakor Tashkent | 2017 | Uzbekistan Super League | 25 | 13 | 2 | 0 | – | | – | | – | | 27 | 13 |
| Pakhtakor Tashkent | Total | | 122 | 61 | 16 | 5 | 0 | 0 | 19 | 8 | 2 | 0 | 159 | 74 |
| Beijing Guoan (loan) | 2016 | Chinese Super League | 14 | 1 | 2 | 0 | – | | – | | – | | 16 | 1 |
| Al Dhafra | 2017–18 | UAE Pro League | 10 | 1 | 0 | 0 | – | | – | | – | | 10 | 1 |
| Pakhtakor Tashkent | 2018 | Uzbekistan Super League | 11 | 4 | 3 | 1 | – | | 0 | 0 | – | | 14 | 5 |
| Pakhtakor Tashkent | 2019 | Uzbekistan Super League | 23 | 18 | 3 | 2 | 2 | 2 | 7 | 2 | – | | 35 | 24 |
| Pakhtakor Tashkent | 2020 | Uzbekistan Super League | 24 | 16 | 3 | 4 | – | | 8 | 2 | – | | 35 | 22 |
| Pakhtakor Tashkent | Total | | 58 | 38 | 9 | 7 | 2 | 2 | 15 | 4 | 0 | 0 | 84 | 51 |
| Aktobe | 2021 | Kazakhstan Premier League | 18 | 7 | 2 | 0 | – | | – | | – | | 20 | 7 |
| Tobol | 2021 | Kazakhstan Premier League | 7 | 4 | 7 | 4 | – | | 4 | 2 (Note: Appearance(s) in UEFA Europa Conference League) | 0 | 0 | 18 | 10 |
| Tobol | 2022 | Kazakhstan Premier League | 26 | 9 | 2 | 2 | – | | 4 | 1 (Note: Appearance(s) in UEFA Champions League) | 1 | 0 | 33 | 12 |
| Tobol | 2023 | Kazakhstan Premier League | 12 | 4 | 3 | 1 | – | | 0 | 0 | – | | 15 | 5 |
| Tobol | Total | | 45 | 17 | 12 | 7 | - | - | 8 | 3 | 1 | 0 | 66 | 27 |
| BG Pathum United | 2023–24 | Thai League 1 | 15 | 5 | 2 | 0 | 0 | 0 | 7 | 6 | – | | 24 | 11 |
| BG Pathum United | 2024–25 | Thai League 1 | 0 | 0 | 0 | 0 | 0 | 0 | 0 | 0 | – | | 0 | 0 |
| BG Pathum United | Total | | 15 | 5 | 2 | 0 | 0 | 0 | 7 | 6 | 0 | 0 | 24 | 11 |
| Pakhtakor Tashkent | 2025 | Uzbekistan Super League | 29 | 20 | 6 | 5 | 0 | 0 | 3 | 0 | – | | 38 | 25 |
| Persepolis | 2025–26 | Persian Gulf Pro League | 6 | 3 | – | | – | | – | | – | | 6 | 3 |
| Persepolis | 2026–27 | Persian Gulf Pro League | 8 | 1 | 0 | 0 | – | | – | | – | | 8 | 1 |
| Persepolis | Total | | 14 | 4 | 0 | 0 | – | | – | | – | | 14 | 4 |
| Career total | | | 325 | 154 | 49 | 24 | 2 | 2 | 52 | 21 | 3 | 0 | 431 | 201 |

=== International ===
As of 27 June 2026

Appearances and goals by national team and year
| National team | Year | Apps | Goals |
|---|---|---|---|
| Uzbekistan | 2013 | 4 | 2 |
| Uzbekistan | 2014 | 10 | 2 |
| Uzbekistan | 2015 | 10 | 5 |
| Uzbekistan | 2016 | 11 | 1 |
| Uzbekistan | 2017 | 8 | 1 |
| Uzbekistan | 2018 | 1 | 0 |
| Uzbekistan | 2019 | 7 | 3 |
| Uzbekistan | 2020 | 3 | 2 |
| Uzbekistan | 2021 | 5 | 0 |
| Uzbekistan | 2022 | 8 | 2 |
| Uzbekistan | 2023 | 4 | 1 |
| Uzbekistan | 2024 | 3 | 1 |
| Uzbekistan | 2025 | 7 | 4 |
| Uzbekistan | 2026 | 6 | 1 |
| Total | | 87 | 25 |

As of match played 17 June 2026
Scores and results list Uzbekistan's goal tally first, score column indicates score after each Sergeev goal.

List of international goals scored by Igor Sergeev
| No. | Date | Venue | Opponent | Score | Result | Competition |
|---|---|---|---|---|---|---|
| 1 | 15 October 2013 | Pakhtakor Central Stadium, Tashkent, Uzbekistan | Vietnam | 3–1 | 3–1 | 2015 AFC Asian Cup qualification |
| 2 | 15 November 2013 | Mỹ Đình National Stadium, Hanoi, Vietnam | Vietnam | 2–0 | 3–0 | 2015 AFC Asian Cup qualification |
| 3 | 5 March 2014 | Bunyodkor Stadium, Tashkent, Uzbekistan | United Arab Emirates | 1–1 | 1–1 | 2015 AFC Asian Cup qualification |
| 4 | 4 September 2014 | Pakhtakor Central Stadium, Tashkent, Uzbekistan | Jordan | 1–0 | 2–0 | Friendly |
| 5 | 10 January 2015 | Stadium Australia, Sydney, Australia | North Korea | 1–0 | 1–0 | 2015 AFC Asian Cup |
| 6 | 8 September 2015 | Philippine Sports Stadium, Bocaue, Philippines | Philippines | 3–0 | 5–1 | 2018 FIFA World Cup qualification |
| 7 | 8 September 2015 | Philippine Sports Stadium, Bocaue, Philippines | Philippines | 4–0 | 5–1 | 2018 FIFA World Cup qualification |
| 8 | 8 October 2015 | Bahrain National Stadium, Riffa, Bahrain | Bahrain | 2–0 | 4–0 | 2018 FIFA World Cup qualification |
| 9 | 12 November 2015 | Pakhtakor Markaziy Stadium, Tashkent, Uzbekistan | North Korea | 1–1 | 3–1 | 2018 FIFA World Cup qualification |
| 10 | 10 November 2016 | Pakhtakor Markaziy Stadium, Tashkent, Uzbekistan | Jordan | 1–0 | 1–0 | Friendly |
| 11 | 25 August 2017 | Pakhtakor Central Stadium, Tashkent, Uzbekistan | Kyrgyzstan | 2–0 | 5–0 | Friendly |
| 12 | 7 June 2019 | Milliy Stadium, Tashkent, Uzbekistan | North Korea | 3–0 | 4–0 | Friendly |
| 13 | 10 October 2019 | Pakhtakor Central Stadium, Tashkent, Uzbekistan | Yemen | 5–0 | 5–0 | 2022 FIFA World Cup qualification |
| 14 | 9 November 2019 | Pakhtakor Central Stadium, Tashkent, Uzbekistan | Kyrgyzstan | 1–0 | 3–1 | Friendly |
| 15 | 12 October 2020 | Rashid Stadium, Dubai, United Arab Emirates | United Arab Emirates | 1–0 | 2–1 | Friendly |
| 16 | 12 October 2020 | Rashid Stadium, Dubai, United Arab Emirates | United Arab Emirates | 2–0 | 2–1 | Friendly |
| 17 | 25 March 2022 | Markaziy Stadium, Namangan, Uzbekistan | Kyrgyzstan | 2–1 | 3–1 | Nowruz Cup |
| 18 | 25 March 2022 | Markaziy Stadium, Namangan, Uzbekistan | Kyrgyzstan | 3–1 | 3–1 | Nowruz Cup |
| 19 | 21 November 2023 | Bunyodkor Stadium, Tashkent, Uzbekistan | Iran | 2–2 | 2–2 | 2026 FIFA World Cup qualification |
| 20 | 18 January 2024 | Ahmad bin Ali Stadium, Al Rayyan, Qatar | India | 2–0 | 3–0 | 2023 AFC Asian Cup |
| 21 | 10 June 2025 | Milliy Stadium, Tashkent, Uzbekistan | Qatar | 3–0 | 3–0 | 2026 FIFA World Cup qualification |
| 22 | 2 September 2025 | Olympic City Stadium, Tashkent, Uzbekistan | Turkmenistan | 1–0 | 2–1 | 2025 CAFA Nations Cup |
| 23 | 2 September 2025 | Olympic City Stadium, Tashkent, Uzbekistan | Turkmenistan | 2–0 | 2–1 | 2025 CAFA Nations Cup |
| 24 | 5 September 2025 | Olympic City Stadium, Tashkent, Uzbekistan | Kyrgyzstan | 3–0 | 4–0 | 2025 CAFA Nations Cup |
| 25 | 8 June 2026 | Icahn Stadium, New York, United States | Netherlands | 1–1 | 1–2 | Friendly |

== Honours ==
Pakhtakor Tashkent

- Uzbek League: 2012, 2014, 2015, 2019
- Uzbek League runner-up: 2011
- Uzbek Cup: 2011, 2019, 2025

Tobol

- Kazakhstan Premier League: 2021

BG Pathum United

- Thai League Cup: 2023–24

Individual

- AFC U-19 Championship top scorer: 2012 (7 goals)
- Uzbek League Top Scorer: 2015 (24 goals), 2025 (20 goals),
- CAFA Nations Cup top scorer: 2025
- Uzbekistan Super League Player of the Month: April 2025, May 2025
