= Murod Kholmukhamedov =

Uzbek footballer

Murod Kholmuhamedov
Personal information
- Full name: Murod Kholmukhamedov
- Date of birth: 23 December 1990 (age 35)
- Place of birth: Tashkent, Uzbek SSR, Soviet Union
- Height: 1.90 m (6 ft 3 in)
- Position: Defender

Team information
- Current team: Kokand 1912
- Number: 70

Senior career*
Years	Team	Apps	(Gls)
2008–2015	Pakhtakor Tashkent	46	(0)
2006	→ Dalian Shide (loan)	4	(0)
2016	Sogdiana Jizzakh	27	(3)
2017–2022	Kokand 1912	89	(31)
2020	→ Bunyodkor (loan)	0	(0)

International career
2009–	Uzbekistan	11	(1)
- * Club domestic league appearances and goals

Murod Kholmukhamedov (born 23 December 1990) is an Uzbek footballer who currently plays as a defender for Kokand 1912 in the Uzbekistan Super League. He is also a member of the Uzbekistan national team.

== International goals ==
Scores and results list Uzbekistan's goal tally first.

No.	Date	Venue	Opponent	Score	Result	Competition
1.	3 September 2020	Lokomotiv Stadium, Tashkent, Uzbekistan	Tajikistan	2–1	2–1	Friendly

== Honours ==
Pakhtakor Tashkent

- Uzbek League: 2012, 2014, 2015
- Uzbekistan Cup: 2009, 2011
