= Michael Okoro Ibe =

Nigerian footballer

Ibe
- Ibe with Andijon in 2020

Personal information
- Full name: Michael Okoro Ibe
- Date of birth: 6 June 1995 (age 31)
- Place of birth: Port Harcourt, Nigeria
- Height: 1.87 m (6 ft 2 in)
- Position: Midfielder

Team information
- Current team: Remo Stars F.C.
- Number: 26

Senior career*
Years	Team	Apps	(Gls)
2014–2015	Abia Warriors	12	(0)
2016–2017	Akwa United	39	(8)
2017–2018	Niger Tornadoes		
2019	Plateau United	7	(0)
2020	Andijon	7	(0)
2020–2021	Mash'al Mubarek	22	(2)
2021–2023	Abia Warriors	3	(1)
2023–2024	Katsina United	33	(10)
2024–	Remo Stars F.C.	10	(2)

International career^{‡}
2015–2016	Nigeria U23		
- * Club domestic league appearances and goals as of 23 June 2024 ‡ National team caps and goals as of 16 November 2016 (UTC)

Michael Okoro Ibe (born 6 June 1995) is a Nigerian international footballer who plays as a midfielder for Nigeria Premier Football League side Remo Stars F.C.

== External link ==
- Michael Okoro Ibe at Soccerway
