= PFK Metallurg Bekabad =

- Full name: Metallurg Bekobod
- Founded: 1945; 81 years ago
- Dissolved: 2025; 1 year ago
- Ground: Metallurg Bekabad Stadium
- Capacity: 15,000
- Manager: Andrey Shipilov
- 2024: Super League, 13th of 14
Home colours	Away colours

PFK Metallurg Bekabad (Uzbek: "Metallurg Bekobod") is a former Uzbek football club based in Bekabad. They played in the Uzbekistan Super League until 2024.

== History ==
The club was founded in 1945. Metallurg played in one of the regional zones of the Soviet Second League. Since 1992, the club played in the Uzbekistan First League. From 1992 to 1993 the club was named Madanchi. In 1994 it was renamed to Metallurg. In the 1997 season club finished as runner-up after Temiryo'lchi and got promoted to the Uzbek League. In the 2002 season Metallurg finisheded at 5th place, which was the club's highest performance.

== Domestic history ==
Season	League									Uzbek Cup	Top goalscorer		Manager
Season	Div.	Pos.	Pl.	W	D	L	GS	GA	P	Uzbek Cup	Name	League	Manager
1992	2nd	8th	30	13	7	10	45	50	33	R32			
1993	2nd	11th	30	8	11	11	35	41	27	R32			
1994	2nd	7th	34	15	8	11	66	36	38	R16	(Uzbekistan) Ravshan Shukurov	18	
1995	2nd	10th	22	6	3	13	32	53	21	Preliminary round			
1996	2nd	9th	52	24	6	22	73	64	78	Preliminary round			
1997	2nd	2nd	42	27	6	9	95	42	87	Preliminary round			
1998	1st	13th	30	9	7	14	37	50	34	R32			
1999	1st	8th	30	11	6	13	41	44	39	R32			
2000	1st	13th	38	12	8	18	44	58	44	R32			
2001	1st	14th	34	9	12	13	42	60	39	R16			
2002	1st	5th	30	14	6	10	40	35	48	R16	(Uzbekistan) Vladimir Gavrilov	8	
2003	1st	13th	30	9	5	16	36	69	32	R16			
2004	1st	9th	26	8	3	15	26	48	27	R32	(Uzbekistan) Khikmat Khoshimov	6	
2005	1st	11th	26	9	2	15	32	47	29	Preliminary round	(Uzbekistan) Islom Choriev (Uzbekistan) Mukhtor Kurbonov	7	
2006	1st	14th	30	7	7	16	36	45	28	Quarterfinal	(Uzbekistan) Bahrom Umarov	11	
2007	1st	15th	30	6	5	19	32	62	23	Last 16	(Uzbekistan) Bahrom Umarov	6	
2008	1st	7th	30	12	6	12	28	34	42	Last 16	(Uzbekistan) Umid Tojimov (Uzbekistan) Zokhid Abdullaev	5	
2009	1st	12th	30	7	10	13	36	49	31	Last 16			(Uzbekistan) Rustam Mirsodiqov
2010	1st	6th	26	9	8	9	29	31	35	Last 16	(Uzbekistan) Zokhid Abdullaev	7	(Uzbekistan) Rustam Mirsodiqov
2011	1st	8th	26	9	4	13	35	42	31	Last 16	(Uzbekistan) Ilyos Kurbonov	8	(Uzbekistan) Rustam Mirsodiqov
2012	1st	10th	26	8	5	13	32	46	29	Quarterfinal	(Uzbekistan) Zokhid Abdullaev	9	(Uzbekistan) Rustam Mirsodiqov
2013	1st	7th	26	10	3	13	36	44	33	R32	(Uzbekistan) Shahzodbek Nurmatov	9	(Uzbekistan) Rustam Mirsodiqov
2014	1st	9th	26	8	4	14	44	54	28	Last 16	(Uzbekistan) Sunatilla Mamadaliyev (Uzbekistan) Shahzodbek Nurmatov	8	(Uzbekistan) Rustam Mirsodiqov
2015	1st	9th	30	10	6	14	44	38	36	Quarterfinal	(Uzbekistan) Shahzodbek Nurmatov	10	(Uzbekistan) Rustam Mirsodiqov
2016	1st	7th	30	14	7	9	47	34	49	Quarterfinal	(Uzbekistan) Zokhid Abdullaev	18	(Uzbekistan) Rustam Mirsodiqov
2017	1st	10th	30	12	4	14	40	39	40	Third round	(Uzbekistan) Zokhir Abdullaev	12	(Uzbekistan) Rustam Mirsodiqov
2018	1st	5th	20	5	4	11	12	28	19	R32	(Uzbekistan) Zokhir Abdullaev (Uzbekistan) Islombek Isakjanov	7	(Uzbekistan) Andrey Shipilov
2019	1st	5th	26	9	8	9	33	26	35	Second round	(Uzbekistan) Zokhid Abdullaev (Uzbekistan) Muzaffar Muzaffarov (Uzbekistan) Stanislav Andreev (Uzbekistan) Bahodir Pardaev	5	(Uzbekistan) Andrey Shipilov
2020	1st	7th	26	10	6	10	30	30	36	Quarterfinal	(Uzbekistan) Shakhzod Ubaydullaev	8	(Uzbekistan) Andrey Shipilov
2021	1st	11th	26	8	1	17	22	35	25	Last 16	(Uzbekistan) Damir Temirov	4	(Uzbekistan) Jasur Abduraimov
2022	1st	10th	26	8	8	10	19	27	32	Last 16	(Uzbekistan) Bektemir Abdumannonov	5	(Spain) Luisma Hernández
2023	1st	10th	26	8	8	10	19	27	32	Last 16	(Uzbekistan) Zabikhillo Urinboev	9	(Spain) Luisma Hernández
2024	1st	13th	26	8	8	10	19	27	32	Last 16	(Montenegro) Marko Milićković	5	(Montenegro) Vesko Stešević (–17 June 2024) (Uzbekistan) Ilyas Kurbonov (18 June – 12 July 2024) (Uzbekistan) Grigoriy Kolosovskiy (12 July – 14 December 2024)

== Stadium ==
The club has played its matches at Stadium named after A.Anokhin since 1960. Originally the stadium had capacity for 5,000 spectators. In 2009 the reconstruction works started to renovate the stadium. In the Summer of 2012 the construction works finished and capacity of the all-seater stadium had been expanded to 15,000. The opening ceremony of the stadium was held on 4 August 2012 with an Uzbek League match between Metallurg and Pakhtakor which ended 1–2.

== Players ==
=== Final squad ===
As of 2 August 2024

Note: Flags indicate national team as defined under FIFA eligibility rules; some limited exceptions apply. Players may hold more than one non-FIFA nationality.

No.	Pos.	Nation	Player
1	GK	UZB	Samandarbek Jurabekov
2	DF	UZB	Odiljon Abdumajidov
3	DF	UZB	Zafarbek Rakhimov
4	MF	BIH	Kerim Palić
5	DF	UKR	Oleksandr Kucherenko
6	DF	UZB	Khudoyshukur Sattorov
7	MF	UZB	Asadbek Sobirjonov
8	MF	UZB	Iskandar Shaykulov
9	FW	UZB	Zabikhillo Urinboev
10	FW	UZB	Shakhzod Ubaydullaev
11	FW	TJK	Daler Sharipov
12	GK	UZB	Dilruh Aliev
13	DF	UZB	Abdulloh Odiljonov
14	MF	UZB	Abrorbek Toshkuziev
15	DF	UZB	Azizbek Pirmuhammadov
16	DF	UZB	Firdavs Khamidullaev
99	MF	UZB	Abbos Ergashboyev

No.	Pos.	Nation	Player
18	MF	UZB	Sukhrob Parpiev
19	DF	UZB	Abubakir Ashurov
34	MF	UZB	Shohbozbek Abduvaliyev
75	FW	UZB	Komron Omonov
22	MF	UZB	Shakhzodbek Gofurbekov
23	DF	UZB	Abdumutallib Rajabboev
24	DF	UZB	Davron Khashimov
25	MF	UZB	Shahzodbek Nematjonov
26	DF	UZB	Sukhrobjon Tursunov
31	MF	MNE	Marko Milićković
32	DF	UZB	Zafarbek Rakhimjonov
33	DF	SRB	Ivan Josović
35	GK	UZB	Rakhimjon Davronov
77	MF	UZB	Alisher Khayrullaev
87	GK	UZB	Akmal Ortiqov
88	MF	UZB	Sirojiddin Kuziev
98	FW	MNE	Balša Sekulić

== Honours ==
- Uzbek SSR Cup
  - Winners (2): 1985, 1990
- Uzbekistan First League
  - Runners-up: 1997
