= Youth Sports Complex (Navoi) =

Sports venue in Navoi, Uzbekistan

Coordinates: 40.1168°N 65.3844°E

Youth Sports Complex Uzbek: Yoshlar Sport Majmuasi
- Youth Stadium; Uzbek: Yoshlar stadioni
- Interactive map of Youth Sports Complex; Uzbek: Yoshlar Sport Majmuasi
- Location: Navoi, Uzbekistan
- Owner: FC Qizilqum
- Operator: Uzbekistan Football Association
- Capacity: 12.500
- Surface: natural turf, grass
- Field size: 112m x 72m

Construction
- Built: 2010-2012
- Opened: 2014

Tenant
- FC Qizilqum

The Youth Sports Complex is a multi-purpose stadium located in the city of Navoi, Uzbekistan and is the home stadium of the local FC Qizilqum. The stadium has a capacity of 12,500 fans.
