= Ifeanyi Ifeanyi =

Nigerian footballer

Personal information
- Date of birth: 15 August 1995 (age 31)
- Place of birth: Lagos, Nigeria
- Height: 1.73 m (5 ft 8 in)
- Position: Midfielder

Team information
- Current team: Mash'al
- Number: 24

Senior career*
Years	Team	Apps	(Gls)
2015	Water		
2016	MFM		
2017–2019	Akwa United		
2019	ES Sétif	10	(0)
2019–2020	Akwa United	11	(3)
2020–2021	Mash'al	42	(0)
2022	Newroz		
2023–2024	Qizilqum	22	(2)
2025–2026	Al Najaf	22	(0)
2026–	Mash'al	5	(0)

International career^{‡}
2017–2018	Nigeria	6	(0)
- * Club domestic league appearances and goals as of 5 September 2026 ‡ National team caps and goals as of 22 March 2018

Ifeanyi Ifeanyi (born 15 August 1995) is a Nigerian international footballer who as a midfielder for Uzbekistan Super League club Mash'al.

== Club career ==
Born in Lagos, Ifeanyi spent his early career with Water, MFM and Akwa United. In January 2019 he moved to Algerian club ES Sétif. He returned to Akwa United later that year, before signing for Uzbek club Mash'al Mubarek, Iraqi club Newroz, and Uzbek club Qizilqum Zarafshon.

== International career ==
He made his international debut for Nigeria in 2017.
