= Sanjar Tursunov =

Sanjar Tursunov may refer to:

- Sanzhar Tursunov, Uzbekistani footballer
- Sanjar Tursunov (boxer), Uzbekistani boxer
