= Ivan Josović =

Serbian footballer

Personal information
- Full name: Ivan Josović
- Date of birth: 27 December 1989 (age 36)
- Place of birth: Ivanjica, SFR Yugoslavia
- Height: 1.82 m (6 ft 0 in)
- Position: Left-back

Team information
- Current team: Sloga Požega

Senior career*
Years	Team	Apps	(Gls)
2007–2014	Javor Ivanjica	60	(2)
2007–2008	→ Sloga Požega (loan)		
2009	→ Radnički Kragujevac (loan)	11	(0)
2009	→ Sloga Požega (loan)	13	(1)
2010	→ Bačinci (loan)	13	(1)
2015	Borac Čačak	4	(0)
2015–2019	Javor Ivanjica	54	(3)
2019	Inđija	11	(0)
2020–2023	Kokand 1912	66	(8)
2023–2024	Metallurg Bekabad	26	(0)
2025	Sloven	13	(1)
2025–2026	FAP	11	(0)
2026–	Sloga Požega	0	(0)
- * Club domestic league appearances and goals as of 20 March 2026

Ivan Josović (Serbian Cyrillic: Иван Јосовић; born 27 December 1989) is a Serbian footballer who plays as a defender for Serbian League club Sloga Požega.
