= Shakhzod Ubaydullaev =

Uzbekistani footballer

Personal information
- Full name: Shakhzod Umid o'g'li Ubaydullaev
- Date of birth: March 2, 1998 (age 28)
- Place of birth: Kosonsoy, Uzbekistan
- Height: 1.77 m (5 ft 10 in)
- Position: Forward

Team information
- Current team: Bukhara
- Number: 10

Youth career
- Mash'al Mubarek

Senior career*
Years	Team	Apps	(Gls)
2018	Mash'al Mubarek	1	(0)
2018–2019	Andijon	24	(9)
2020	Metallurg Bekabad	26	(8)
2021–2023	Shakhtyor Soligorsk	5	(0)
2021	→ Energetik-BGU Minsk (loan)	11	(3)
2022	→ Neftchi Fergana (loan)	21	(4)
2023–2024	Metallurg Bekabad	32	(6)
2025	Navbahor Namangan	8	(0)
2026–	Bukhara	13	(2)

International career^{‡}
2020	Uzbekistan	3	(1)
- * Club domestic league appearances and goals as of 28 July 2026 ‡ National team caps and goals as of 17 November 2020

Shakhzod Ubaydullaev (Uzbek Cyrillic: Шахзод Убайдуллаев; born 2 March 1998) is an Uzbekistani footballer who plays for Bukhara.

== Career ==
=== International ===
He made his debut for main team, Uzbekistan on 3 September 2020 in a friendly match against Tajikistan.

Uzbekistan national team
Year	Apps	Goals
2020	1	1
Total	1	1

Statistics accurate as of match played 3 September 2020.

== International goals ==
Scores and results list Uzbekistan's goal tally first.

No.	Date	Venue	Opponent	Score	Result	Competition
1.	3 September 2020	Lokomotiv Stadium, Tashkent, Uzbekistan	Tajikistan	1–0	2–1	Friendly

== Honours ==
=== Club ===
Andijon

- Uzbekistan Pro League (1): 2018
