= McCartney Naweseb =

Namibian footballer

- McCartney with Qizilqum in 2020

Personal information
- Full name: McCartney Tevin Naweseb
- Date of birth: 30 August 1997 (age 29)
- Place of birth: Windhoek, Namibia
- Position: Forward

Senior career*
Years	Team	Apps	(Gls)
2016–2019	Black Africa		
2020	Qizilqum	8	(1)
2020	Sevan	4	(0)

International career^{‡}
2019–	Namibia	3	(0)
- * Club domestic league appearances and goals as of 10 March 2021 ‡ National team caps and goals as of 30 May 2019

McCartney Tevin Naweseb (born 30 August 1997) is a Namibian professional footballer who plays as an attacker for the Namibia national team.

== Club career ==
In February 2020, Naweseb signed for Uzbek club FC Qizilqum Zarafshon before leaving in August 2020.

In January 2021, Sevan announced that Naweseb had left the club.
