= Kirill Pogrebnyak =

Russian footballer

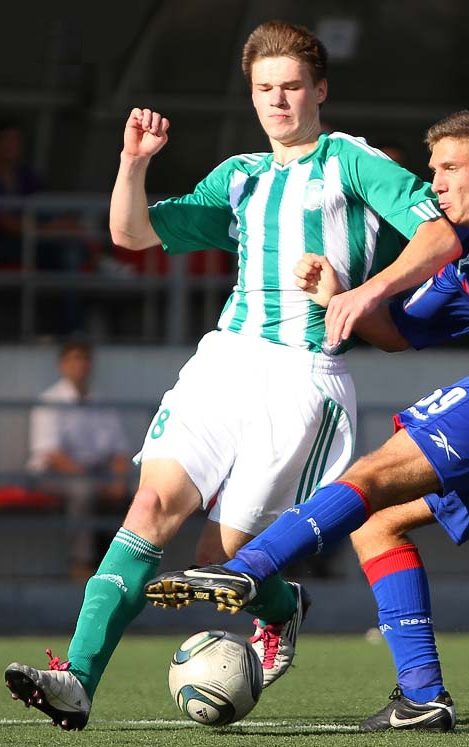
- Pogrebnyak with FC Tom Tomsk

Personal information
- Full name: Kirill Viktorovich Pogrebnyak
- Date of birth: 27 June 1992 (age 34)
- Place of birth: Moscow, Russia
- Height: 1.85 m (6 ft 1 in)
- Position: Second striker

Team information
- Current team: Russia
- Number: 8

Youth career
- 2010: Timiryazevets Moscow
- 2011–2012: Tom Tomsk

Senior career*
Years	Team	Apps	(Gls)
2011–2016	Tom Tomsk	88	(21)
2013–2014	→ Fakel Voronezh (loan)	24	(8)
2017	Zenit-2 St.Petersburg	11	(3)
2017–2018	Baltika Kaliningrad	20	(2)
2019	Falkenberg	19	(2)
2020	Lokomotiv Tashkent	17	(5)
2021	FC Heraklion Moscow (amateur)		

International career
2010	Russia U-18	8	(6)
2011	Russia U-19	5	(3)
2012	Russia U-20	1	(0)
- * Club domestic league appearances and goals as of 15 June 2021

Kirill Viktorovich Pogrebnyak (Russian: Кирилл Викторович Погребняк; born 27 June 1992) is a Russian former football second striker.

== Career ==
Pogrebnyak made his professional debut for Tom Tomsk on 17 July 2011 in the Russian Cup game against Metallurg-Oskol.

He scored his first goal for the club against Sibir Novosibirsk on 1 September 2012. It was Pogrebnyak's equaliser that led Tom Tomsk to the penalty shootout where they won 4–3.

On 3 August 2013, Pogrebnyak was moved to FC Fakel Voronezh.

On 12 March 2019, he signed a one-year contract with Allsvenskan club Falkenberg.

== Personal life ==
He is the younger brother of Pavel Pogrebnyak and twin of Nikolai Pogrebnyak.
