= FC Sochi =

FC Sochi may refer to several association football clubs in Sochi, Russia:

- FC Sochi-04, 2004–2009
- FC Sochi 2013, 2013–2017
- PFC Sochi, 2018–present
