= Shahzodbek Nurmatov =

Uzbek footballer (born 1991)

Personal information
- Date of birth: 18 September 1991 (age 35)
- Place of birth: Tashkent, Uzbekistan
- Height: 1.85 m (6 ft 1 in)
- Position: Forward

Team information
- Current team: AGMK
- Number: 99

Senior career*
Years	Team	Apps	(Gls)
2011	Dinamo Samarqand	9	(0)
2012–2015	Metallurg Bekabad	99	(35)
2016–2018	Bunyodkor	84	(13)
2019–	AGMK	4	(0)

International career^{‡}
2014–	Uzbekistan	3	(0)
- * Club domestic league appearances and goals as of 23:10, 17 May 2019 (UTC) ‡ National team caps and goals as of 31 March 2015

Shahzodbek Nurmatov (born 18 September 1991) is an Uzbek footballer who plays as a forward for FC AGMK in the Uzbekistan Super League.

== Career ==
Before joining Metallurg Bekabad in 2011, Nurmatov played for FK Dinamo Samarqand. He was one of the leading players and top scorers for Metallurg in the recent seasons. On September 14, 2013, he scored a hat-trick in a 5:3 victory over FK Guliston. In the 2013–2015 seasons, he was consistently the best club goalscorer, scoring nine, eight goals and ten goals for Metallurg.

On 2 January 2015, it was announced that Nurmatov had moved to Bunyodkor.

== International ==
He made his official debut for the national team on 20 August 2014 in Baku in a friendly match against Azerbaijan, which ended in a 0–0 draw.

== Career statistics ==
=== Club ===
As of 22 November 2015

Club	Season	League		Cup		AFC		Total	
Club	Season	Apps	Goals	Apps	Goals	Apps	Goals	Apps	Goals
FK Dinamo Samarqand	2011	9	0	0	0	-		9	0
FK Dinamo Samarqand	Total	9	0	0	0	-		9	0
Metallurg Bekabad	2011	6	0	0	0	-		6	0
Metallurg Bekabad	2012	26	8	3	1	-		29	9
Metallurg Bekabad	2013	20	9	0	0	-		20	9
Metallurg Bekabad	2014	21	8	-				20	8
Metallurg Bekabad	2015	26	10	3	2	-		29	12
Metallurg Bekabad	Total	99	35	6	4	-		105	39
Career total		108	35	6	4	–		114	39
