= Shakhboz Erkinov =

Uzbekistani association football player

Personal information
- Full name: Shakhboz Furkatovich Erkinov
- Date of birth: 16 July 1986 (age 40)
- Place of birth: Tashkent, Soviet Union
- Height: 1.83 m (6 ft 0 in)
- Position: Striker

Team information
- Current team: Andijon
- Number: 22

Youth career
- Pakhtakor

Senior career*
Years	Team	Apps	(Gls)
2005	Sogdiana Jizzakh	30	(15)
2006	Sho'rtanneftgaz G'uzor	38	(16)
2007	Pakhtakor	30	(15)
2008	Sogdiana Jizzakh	28	(13)
2008–2010	PAS Hamedan	31	(15)
2010–2011	Shurtan Guzar	33	(18)
2012	Pakhtakor	15	(2)
2013	Olmaliq FK	15	(7)
2014–2016	Navbahor Namangan	51	(27)
2016	Mash'al Mubarek	14	(4)
2016–2018	Nasaf Qarshi	29	(11)
2018	Bukhara	24	(1)
2019	Kokand 1912	24	(6)
2020–2021	Bunyodkor	43	(8)
2022–2023	Andijon	11	(0)

International career
2004	Uzbekistan U20		
2007–2009	Uzbekistan U23		
2009	Uzbekistan	3	(0)
- * Club domestic league appearances and goals as of 19:18, 2 November 2022 (UTC)

Shakhboz Furkatovich Erkinov (born 16 July 1986) is a Russian-Uzbekistani former football player. He last played for the Uzbekistan Pro League club FK Andijon as a forward.

== Career ==
He started playing career at Sogdiana Jizzakh in 2005. In 2006, he moved to Sho'rtanneftgaz G'uzor. From 2008 to 2009 he played for PAS Hamedan in Iran Pro League. He reached semi-final of Hazfi Cup in 2009 with his club and lost by 0:1 to Rah Ahan Sorinet. After playing two seasons for PAS Hamedan he joined Shurtan Guzar. In 2009 season he scored 9 goals and became the best club goal scorer in League matches. He scored also 9 goals in the next season and became 2nd best goalscorer after Igor Taran with 10 goals.

In 2014, he moved to Navbahor Namangan. He became one of the league top scorers with 14 goals and one of the three players made hat-trick in 2014 League season. Erkinov completed two hat-tricks in the season. On 26 April 2014 he made first hat-trick of 2014 League season in match Navbahor – Sogdiana Jizzakh ended with score 4:2. On 12 September 2014 in an away match against Sogdiana ended with 5:4 victory of Sogdiana side, he scored another three goals. As of end of the 2014 season Erkinov scored 14 goals in League, only 4 less than League scorer Artur Gevorkyan. In 2014 Uzbek Cup matches he also scored 3 goals for the club.

On 16 May 2015 Erkinov scored a spectacular Comeback goal in a League away match against FK Andijan. After Predrag Vujović goal for Andijan on 76-minute with 2:1 leading, Navbahor players were to start the game from pitch centre. Erkinov received ball and noticed that Andijans's goalkeeper Ghenadie Moșneaga was standing a long way out of his goal, and hit a shot from the halfway line over the goalkeeper and ball floated into the net. His this goal was scored on 77 minutes with 2:2.

In 2015 season Erkinov again became the club's best goalscorer in League with 13 goals.

== International career ==
Shakhboz Erkinov was a member of Uzbekistan national under-20 football team at the 2004 AFC Youth Championship. He was also with Uzbekistan national under-23 football team, competing in the qualification games for the 2008 Summer Olympics.

He made his debut for senior team on 28 January 2009 against UAE national football team at a qualification game for 2011 Asian Cup.

== Honours ==
=== Club ===
Shurtan Guzar

- Uzbek Cup runner-up: 2010

=== Individual ===
- Navbahor's Top Scorer in League (2): 2014, 2015

== Career statistics ==
As of 22 November 2015

Club	Season	League		Cup		AFC		Total	
Club	Season	Apps	Goals	Apps	Goals	Apps	Goals	Apps	Goals
PAS Hamedan	2008–09	17	5	3	2	-		20	7
PAS Hamedan	2009–10	14	2	-	-	-		14	2
PAS Hamedan	Total	31	7	3	2	-		34	9
Shurtan Guzar	2010	13	9	2	1	-		15	10
Shurtan Guzar	2011	20	9	3	2	6	2	29	13
Shurtan Guzar	Total	33	18	5	3	6	2	44	23
Pakhtakor	2012	15	2	4	1	-		19	3
Olmaliq	2013	15	7	2	0	-		17	7
Navbahor	2014	25	14	3	3	-		28	17
Navbahor	2015	26	13	1	0	-		27	13
Navbahor	Total	51	27	4	1	-		55	28
Career total		145	61	18	9	6	2	169	72

- Assist Goals

Season	Team	Assists
08–09	Pas	2
09–10	Pas	0
