= Filip Rajevac =

Serbian footballer

Personal information
- Date of birth: 21 June 1992 (age 34)
- Place of birth: Valjevo, FR Yugoslavia
- Height: 1.85 m (6 ft 1 in)
- Position: Forward

Team information
- Current team: Radnički Valjevo

Senior career*
Years	Team	Apps	(Gls)
2009–2011	Budućnost Valjevo	36	(5)
2011	Jedinstvo Ub	14	(8)
2012	Jedinstvo Užice	11	(2)
2012	Krušik Valjevo	14	(1)
2013	Kolubara	9	(2)
2013–2014	Železničar Lajkovac	25	(11)
2014	Budućnost Krušik 2014	15	(12)
2015	Siarka Tarnobrzeg	7	(0)
2015–2017	OFK Beograd	21	(3)
2017	Kokand 1912	28	(7)
2018	Bunyodkor	27	(7)
2019	Lokomotiv Tashkent	9	(0)
2019	Inđija	5	(1)
2020	Kokand 1912	20	(3)
2021	Budućnost Dobanovci	17	(2)
2021–2022	Loznica	18	(2)
2022	Zlatibor Čajetina	10	(5)
2022–2023	Budućnost Krušik 2014		
2023–2024	Železničar Lajkovac		
2024–	Radnički Valjevo		
- * Club domestic league appearances and goals as of 21 June 2024

Filip Rajevac (Serbian Cyrillic: Филип Рајевац; born 21 June 1992) is a Serbian footballer who plays as a forward for Radnički Valjevo.

== Career ==
=== Budućnost Valjevo ===
Born in Valjevo, Rajevac started his career in local club Budućnost. For 2 seasons, he played 36 matches in the Serbian League West and scored 5 goals.

=== Jedinstvo Ub ===
After Budućnost, Rajevac played for Jedinstvo Ub, in the first half of season 2011–12. He scored 8 goal on 15 matches playing for the team from Ub.

=== Jedinstvo Užice ===
Rajevac moved to the club with the same name, Jedinstvo Užice for the second half of 2011–12 season. He played 11 matches and scored 2 goal until the end of season. The club was also promoted in Serbian First League for the next season.

=== Krušik ===
Attacker returned in Valjevo, in football club of the "Krušik" industry in summer 2012. He made 14 appearances and scored 1 goal playing for FK Krušik Valjevo. After 6 months he left to FK Kolubara.

=== Kolubara ===
On 9 matches in the Serbian First League, he scored 2 goals, against Čukarički, and Napredak. After the end of 2012–13 season, he left FK Kolubara.

=== Železničar Lajkovac ===
In the 2013–14 season, Rajevac played for Železničar Lajkovac. He made 25 league appearances and scored 11 goals until the end of season.

=== Budućnost Krušik ===
After the merger of two Valjevo clubs, Budućnost, and Krušik, Rajevac returned to his home town and joined FK Budućnost Krušik 2014. Rajevac played all 15 fixtures, and was the best team scorer in the first half of 2014–15 season. He scored 4 goals against Pobeda Beloševac in 11th fixture, when he scored a spectacular goal from a bicycle kick, and also 1 from penalty. 2 goals scored against Bane in 2nd fixture, including 1 penalty, and against GFK Jasenica in 6th fixture, both from penalties. He also scored a goals against Jošanica in the 1st, Šumadija 1903 in 3rd, Jedinstvo Ub in 12th and Šumadija Aranđelovac in 14th fixture. He also played matches against Sloga Požega in 4th, Polet Ljubić in 5th, Karađorđe Topola in 7th, Zvižd in 8th, Rudar Kostolac in 9th, Loznica in 10th, Smederevo in 13th, and Železničar Lajkovac in the 15th, fixture of Serbian League West. He left the club after the first half of season.

=== Siarka Tarnobrzeg ===
Filip moved to Poland on the beginning of 2015, and joined Siarka Tarnobrzeg for 6 months. He debuted for his new team on 8 March 2015, in a 3:1 loss against Znicz Pruszków. After that, he played 6 more matches until the end of season, but without goals.

=== OFK Beograd ===
After short abroad episode, Rajevac joined OFK Beograd in summer 2015, but due to administrative problems gained the right to play in 4th fixture of the Serbian SuperLiga.

=== Bunyodkor ===
On 23 January 2018, Bunyodkor announced the signing of Rajevac.

=== Lokomotiv Tashkent ===
Rajevas joined PFC Lokomotiv Tashkent on 1 January 2019.

== Career statistics ==
As of 16 May 2016

Appearances and goals by club, season and competition
Club	Season	League			National cup (Note: Includes Serbian Cup, Polish Cup.)		Continental		Total	
Club	Season	Division	Apps	Goals	Apps	Goals	Apps	Goals	Apps	Goals
Budućnost Valjevo	2009–10	Serbian League West	13	1	0	0	0	0	13	1
Budućnost Valjevo	2010–11	Serbian League West	23	4	0	0	0	0	23	4
Budućnost Valjevo	Total		36	5	0	0	0	0	36	5
Jedinstvo Ub	2011–12	Serbian League West	14	8	0	0	0	0	14	8
Jedinstvo Užice	2011–12	Serbian League West	11	2	0	0	0	0	11	2
Krušik Valjevo	2012–13	Serbian League West	14	1	0	0	0	0	14	1
Kolubara	2012–13	Serbian First League	9	2	0	0	0	0	9	2
Železničar Lajkovac	2013–14	Serbian League West	25	11	0	0	0	0	25	11
Budućnost Krušik	2014–15	Serbian League West	15	12	0	0	0	0	15	12
Siarka Tarnobrzeg	2014–15	II liga	7	0	0	0	0	0	7	0
OFK Beograd	2015–16	Serbian SuperLiga	7	1	1	0	0	0	8	1
Career total			138	42	1	0	0	0	139	42

== Honours ==
Jedinstvo Užice

- Serbian League West: 2011–12
