= 2015 Uzbek League =

Uzbek League
- Season: 2015
- Champions: Pakhtakor
- Relegated: FK Samarqand-Dinamo
- Champions League: Pakhtakor; Lokomotiv; Nasaf Qarshi; Bunyodkor
- Top goalscorer: Igor Sergeev (23 goals)
- Biggest home win: Lokomotiv- Sogdiana - 7:0; (17 August 2015)

The 2015 Uzbek League was the 24th season of top level football in Uzbekistan since independence in 1992. Pakhtakor were the defending champions from the 2014 campaign.

== Teams ==
Location of teams in 2015 Uzbek League

Sogdiana Jizzakh and FK Andijan remained for 2015 Uzbek League edition due decision of UzPFL to expand League to 16 teams from 2015 season. Shurtan Guzar and Kokand 1912 promoted to 2015 League as 2014 First League winner and runner-up.

Club	Coach	Location	Stadium	Capacity
FK Andijan	(Uzbekistan) Sergey Kovshov	Andijan	Soghlom Avlod Stadium	18,360
Bunyodkor	(Uzbekistan) Bakhtiyor Babaev	Tashkent	Bunyodkor Stadium	34,000
Bukhoro	(Uzbekistan) Jamshid Saidov	Bukhoro	Buxoro Arena	22,700
Dinamo	(Uzbekistan) Bakhrom Khakimov	Samarqand	Dinamo Stadium	16,000
Kokand 1912	(Uzbekistan) Vadim Shodimatov	Kokand	Kokand Stadium	10,500
Lokomotiv	(Australia) Mirko Jeličić	Tashkent	Lokomotiv Stadium	8,000
Mash'al	(Uzbekistan) Alexander Khomyakov	Muborak	Bahrom Vafoev Stadium	10,000
Metallurg	(Uzbekistan) Rustam Mirsodiqov	Bekabad	Metallurg Stadium	15,000
Nasaf Qarshi	(Uzbekistan) Ruziqul Berdiev	Qarshi	Qarshi Stadium	14,750
Navbahor	(Uzbekistan) Bakhtiyor Ashurmatov	Namangan	Navbahor Stadium	22,000
Neftchi	(Russia) Andrey Fyodorov	Farghona	Istiqlol Stadium	20,000
Olmaliq FK	(Uzbekistan) Igor Shkvyrin	Olmaliq	Olmaliq SM Stadium	12,000
Pakhtakor	(Uzbekistan) Numon Khasanov	Tashkent	Pakhtakor Stadium	35,000
Qizilqum	(Uzbekistan) Yuriy Lukin	Zarafshon	Yoshlar Stadium	12,500
Sogdiana	(Uzbekistan) Davron Fayziev	Jizzakh	Sogdiana Stadium	11,650
Shurtan Guzar	(Uzbekistan) Mukhtor Kurbonov	Ghuzor	Ghuzor Stadium	7,000

=== Managerial changes ===
Team	Outgoing manager	Manner of departure	Date of vacancy	Position in table	Replaced by	Date of appointment
Bukhoro	(Uzbekistan) Alexander Mochinov	Resigned	17 May 2015	16th	(Uzbekistan) Shukhrat Fayziev	21 May 2015
Dinamo Samarqand	(Turkmenistan) Tachmurad Agamuradov	Resigned	2 July 2015	12th	(Uzbekistan) Bakhrom Khakimov	7 July 2015
Bukhoro	(Uzbekistan) Shukhrat Fayziev	end of caretaker spell	5 July 2015	16th	(Uzbekistan) Jamshid Saidov	5 July 2015
Pakhtakor	(Uzbekistan) Samvel Babayan	Resigned	7 July 2015	1st	(Uzbekistan) Numon Khasanov	7 July 2015
Andijan	(Germany) Edgar Gess	Sacked	28 August 2015	16th	(Uzbekistan) Sergey Kovshov	2 September 2015
Neftchi	(Uzbekistan) Murod Ismoilov	Resigned	15 September 2015	5th	(Russia) Andrey Fyodorov	15 September 2015
Bunyodkor	(Russia) Sergey Lushan	Resigned	23 September 2015	4th	(Uzbekistan) Bakhtiyor Babaev	23 September 2015
Lokomotiv	(Uzbekistan) Vadim Abramov	Sacked	17 October 2015	2nd	(Australia) Mirko Jeličić (interim)	17 October 2015
Kokand 1912	(Uzbekistan) Rustam Abdullaev	Sacked	6 November 2015	12th	(Uzbekistan) Vadim Shodimatov (interim)	6 November 2015

== League table ==
Pos	Team	Pld	W	D	L	GF	GA	GD	Pts	Qualification or relegation
1	Pakhtakor Tashkent	30	24	3	3	66	23	+43	75	2016 AFC Champions League group stage
2	Lokomotiv Tashkent	30	23	5	2	66	22	+44	74	2016 AFC Champions League group stage
3	Nasaf Qarshi	30	19	5	6	46	20	+26	62	2016 AFC Champions League group stage
4	Bunyodkor	30	18	5	7	44	19	+25	59	2016 AFC Champions League Third qualifying round
5	Neftchi Farg'ona	30	16	4	10	41	30	+11	52	
6	Olmaliq FK	30	12	8	10	53	49	+4	44	
7	Mash'al Mubarek	30	11	5	14	37	42	−5	38	
8	Navbahor Namangan	30	11	4	15	40	51	−11	37	
9	Metallurg Bekabad	30	10	6	14	44	38	+6	36	
10	Qizilqum Zarafshon	30	10	4	16	38	49	−11	34	
11	Shurtan Guzar	30	8	9	13	42	53	−11	33	
12	Kokand 1912	30	9	4	17	31	52	−21	31	
13	FK Andijan	30	8	4	18	27	56	−29	28	
14	FK Buxoro	30	7	5	18	31	53	−22	26	
15	Sogdiana Jizzakh	30	8	2	20	31	60	−29	26	Relegation play-offs
16	Dinamo Samarqand	30	6	7	17	28	48	−20	25	Relegation to Lower Division

Updated to match(es) played on 22 November 2015. Source: Uzbekistan Professional Football League
Rules for classification: 1) points; 2) goal difference; 3) number of goals scored.

== Relegation play-off ==
The one leg relegation play-off match between 15th placed team of Uzbek League, Sogdiana Jizzakh and runners-up of 2015 First League, Oqtepa was played on 25 November 2015 in Olmaliq. Sogdiana won by 2:1 and remained in League.

25 November 2015
14:00 (UTC+05:00)

Oqtepa	1–2	Sogdiana Jizzakh
Khakimov 51'	Report	Sanzhar Rashidov 29'; A.Abdurakhmonov 80'

Olmaliq Stadium, Olmaliq
Attendance: 5,439
Referee: Valentin Kovalenko

== Season statistics ==
=== Top goalscorers ===
#	Scorer	Team	Goals (Pen.)
1	(Uzbekistan) Igor Sergeev	Pakhtakor	23 (4)
2	(Uzbekistan) Bakhriddin Vakhobov	Qizilqum	21 (2)
3	(Uzbekistan) Sanjar Shaakhmedov	Lokomotiv	14 (0)
4	(Uzbekistan) Shakhboz Erkinov	Navbahor	13 (0)
5	(Uzbekistan) Ilkhom Shomurodov	Nasaf	12 (0)
6	(Uzbekistan) Kamoliddin Murzoev	Dinamo	11 (1)
6	(Uzbekistan) Marat Bikmaev	Lokomotiv	11 (1)
6	(Uzbekistan) Igor Taran	Shurtan	11 (3)
6	(Turkmenistan) Artur Gevorkyan	Nasaf	11 (4)
10	(Uzbekistan) Shahzodbek Nurmatov	Metallurg	10 (0)
10	(Uzbekistan) Dostonbek Khamdamov	Bunyodkor	10 (0)
10	(Uzbekistan) Aziz Ibragimov	Bukhoro	10 (1)

Last updated: 22 November 2015
Source: Soccerway

=== Hat–tricks ===
Player	Team	Against	Result	Date
(Uzbekistan) Bakhriddin Vakhobov	Qizilqum	Sogdiana Jizzakh	4–1	14 March 2015
(Uzbekistan) Igor Sergeev	Pakhtakor	Bukhoro	3–1	3 April 2015
(Uzbekistan) Bakhriddin Vakhobov	Qizilqum	Navbahor	3–2	18 June 2015
(Uzbekistan) Ulugbek Bakayev	Navbahor	Shurtan Guzar	4–2	26 June 2015

== Awards ==
=== Monthly awards ===
Month	Manager of the Month		Player of the Month		Reference
Month	Manager	Club	Player	Club	Reference
March	(Uzbekistan) Igor Shkvyrin	Olmaliq	(Uzbekistan) Bakhriddin Vakhobov	Qizilqum	
April	(Uzbekistan) Murod Ismailov	Neftchi	(Uzbekistan) Shohruh Gadoev	Nasaf	
May	(Uzbekistan) Samvel Babayan	Pakhtakor	(Uzbekistan) Bakhriddin Vakhobov	Qizilqum	
June	(Russia) Sergey Lushan	Bunyodkor	(Uzbekistan) Igor Sergeev	Pakhtakor	
August	(Uzbekistan) Ruziqul Berdiev	Nasaf	(Uzbekistan) Sanjar Shaakhmedov	Lokomotiv	
September	(Russia) Andrey Fyodorov	Neftchi	(Uzbekistan) Igor Sergeev	Pakhtakor	
October	(Uzbekistan) Ruziqul Berdiev	Neftchi	(Uzbekistan) Kamoliddin Murzoev	Dinamo	
November	(Uzbekistan) Jamshid Saidov	Bukhoro	(Uzbekistan) Vokhid Shodiev	Bunyodkor	
