= 2023 FC Neftchi Fergana season =

Neftchi Fergana
2023 season
- President: Mansur Tashmatov
- Manager: Vitaly Levchenko
- Uzbek League: 5nd
- Uzbekistan Cup: Group Stage
- Top goalscorer: League: Toma Tabatadze (6); All: Toma Tabatadze (6)
- Highest home attendance: 19,316 vs Andijon (31 August 2023)
- Lowest home attendance: 557 vs Surkhon Termez (7 May 2023)
- Average home league attendance: 13,102 (31 October 2023)
Home colours	Away colours

The 2023 season is the 61nd season in the history of the FC Neftchi Fergana team. In the 32rd season in the history of Uzbek football, it is the 3rd season in a row in the top league of Uzbek football. FC Neftchi Fergana will participate in the current season of the Cup of Uzbekistan in addition to the domestic championship.

== Season events ==
Neftchi has recorded much better results in his second year returning from the Pro League to the Super League. Since the beginning of the season, he has not lost in the Super League of Uzbekistan for 19 consecutive rounds. During the championship, the current champion defeated the Tashkent club "Pakhtakor" both at home and away.

== Squad ==
As of match played 24 October 2023

No.	Name	Nationality	Position	Date of birth (Age)	Signed from	Signed in	Contract ends	Apps.	Goals
Goalkeepers
1	Asrorbek Kenjaev	(Uzbekistan)	GK	15 July 2004 (age 22)	Chigatoy	2023		0	0
12	Vladimir Nazarov	(Uzbekistan)	GK	5 June 2003 (age 23)	Olympic Tashkent	2023	2025	17	0
16	Mukhriddin Shermatov	(Uzbekistan)	GK	24 August 2004 (age 22)	Neftchi	2022		0	0
45	Akbar Turaev	(Uzbekistan)	GK	27 August 1989 (age 37)	Surkhon Termez	2021		46	0
Defenders
2	Zoir Dzhuraboyev	(Tajikistan)	DF	16 September 1998 (age 28)	Surkhon Termez	2023		23	1
3	Nodir Nematkhonov	(Uzbekistan)	DF	17 June 2001 (age 25)	Shurtan Guzar	2022		12	0
5	Tomislav Mrčela	(Australia)	DF	1 December 1990 (age 35)	Western Sydney Wanderers FC	2023		8	0
14	Rakhmonjon Ruziev	(Uzbekistan)	DF	2 May 2002 (age 24)	Lokomotiv Tashkent U21	2022		0	0
17	Ruzimukhammad Kurbonov	(Uzbekistan)	DF	24 October 2004 (age 21)	Academy	2023			
19	Mirzokhid Gofurov	(Uzbekistan)	DF	24 August 1988 (age 38)	Navbahor	2022		55	3
20	Anvarjon Gofurov	(Uzbekistan)	DF	28 June 1995 (age 31)	Metallurg Bekabad	2023		76	0
21	Mukhsin Ubaydullaev	(Uzbekistan)	DF	15 July 1994 (age 32)	Qizilqum	2022		109	1
26	Oleksiy Larin	(Ukraine)	DF	4 June 1994 (age 32)	Pakhtakor	2023		28	3
41	Islomjon Akramov	(Uzbekistan)	DF	25 March 2003 (age 23)	Academy	2022		0	0
44	Mirasror Mirabrorov	(Uzbekistan)	DF	4 July 2003 (age 23)	Academy	2022		0	0
50	Shokhrukhbek Yokubjonov	(Uzbekistan)	DF	29 September 2003 (age 22)	Academy	2022		0	0
52	Shakhzodbek Akhmadjonov	(Uzbekistan)	DF	17 March 2004 (age 22)	Academy	2022		0	0
66	Doniyor Valiev	(Uzbekistan)	DF	14 September 2003 (age 23)	Academy	2022		0	0
71	Nodirbek Akhmadjonov	(Uzbekistan)	DF	12 April 2003 (age 23)	Mash'al Mubarek	2023		0	0
Midfielders
7	Umar Adkhamzoda	(Uzbekistan)	MF	4 April 1998 (age 28)	Istiklol Fergana	2020		69	5
8	Sharof Mukhiddinov	(Uzbekistan)	MF	14 July 1997 (age 29)	Sanat Naft	2023		7	0
10	Sunnatilla Abdullajonov	(Uzbekistan)	MF	22 October 1996 (age 29)	Turon	2022		26	3
13	Lutfulla Turaev	(Uzbekistan)	MF	30 March 1988 (age 38)	Bunyodkor	2022		33	3
17	Abdulloh Olimov	(Uzbekistan)	MF	11 February 1993 (age 33)	Andijon	2021	2024	62	4
23	Diyorjon Turapov	(Uzbekistan)	MF	9 July 1994 (age 32)	Navbahor	2023	2022	24	4
24	Gulyamkhaydar Gulyamov	(Uzbekistan)	MF	21 December 1990 (age 35)	Lokomotiv	2023	2023	25	0
25	Diyrobek Ubaydullaev	(Uzbekistan)	MF	12 June 2001 (age 25)	Lokomotiv BFK	2023	2023	0	0
27	Mukhammadali Kholmatov	(Uzbekistan)	MF	9 March 2004 (age 22)	Youth Team	2021		0	0
28	Fozil Musaev	(Uzbekistan)	MF	2 January 1989 (age 37)	Metallurg	2022	2023	23	2
30	Akobirjon Akhmadjonov	(Uzbekistan)	MF	10 March 2004 (age 22)	Youth Team	2021		0	0
33	Abdulvosid Vosidjonov	(Uzbekistan)	MF	1 April 2004 (age 22)	Youth Team	2023		0	0
70	Abbosbek Gulomov	(Uzbekistan)	MF	5 July 1998 (age 28)	Navbahor	2022		44	2
77	Bilolkhon Toshmirzaev	(Uzbekistan)	MF	8 August 1997 (age 29)	Turon	2023		7	0
88	Khumoyun Bozarboev	(Uzbekistan)	MF	2 April 2004 (age 22)	Bunyodkor	2023		0	0
Forwards
9	Ulugbek Khoshimov	(Uzbekistan)	FW	3 January 2001 (age 25)	Paxtakor	2021	2023	71	6
11	Izzatilla Abdullaev	(Uzbekistan)	FW	16 January 1996 (age 30)	Buxoro	2022	2023	40	6
22	Giorgi Nikabadze	(Georgia (country))	FW	10 January 1991 (age 35)	FC Samgurali Tsqaltubo	2022	Dec 31, 2024	8	2
40	Bachana Arabuli	(Georgia (country))	FW	5 January 1994 (age 32)	Macarthur FC	2023	Dec 31, 2024	7	0
43	Abdulaziz Salokhiddinov	(Uzbekistan)	FW	10 March 2004 (age 22)	Academy	2021		0	0
99	Musomalik Rustamov	(Uzbekistan)	FW	6 September 2002 (age 24)	Academy	2021		0	0
Players who left during the season
9	Nurillo Tukhtasinov	(Uzbekistan)	MF	19 February 1997 (age 29)	Terengganu	2021		13	3
14	Toma Tabatadze	(Georgia (country))	FW	17 December 1991 (age 34)	FC Akzhayik	2022	2023	15	6
15	Yuriy Batyushyn	(Ukraine)	MF	7 December 1992 (age 33)	Dilia	2023		9	1
	Murodbek Bobojonov	(Uzbekistan)	FW	6 July 1994 (age 32)	FC Surkhon			88	16
	Andriy Mishchenko	(Ukraine)	DF	7 April 1991 (age 35)	AGMK			15	0

== Transfers ==
=== In ===
Date	Position	Nationality	Name	From	Fee	Ref.
3 January 2023	MF	(Uzbekistan)	Diyorjon Turapov	Navbahor	Free	
3 January 2023	MF	(Uzbekistan)	Nurillo Tukhtasinov	Navbahor	Free	
15 February 2023	MF	(Ukraine)	Yuriy Batyushyn	FC Dila Gori	Free	
14 July 2023	FW	(Georgia (country))	Toma Tabatadze	FC Akzhayik	Free	
21 July 2023	FW	(Uzbekistan)	Murodbek Bobojonov	Surkhon	Free	
28 July 2023	MF	(Uzbekistan)	Gulyamkhaydar Gulyamov	Lokomotiv Tashkent	Free	
28 July 2023	DF	(Tajikistan)	Zoir Dzhuraboyev	Surkhon	Free	
	DF	(Uzbekistan)	Anvarjon Gofurov	Metallurg	Free	
	GK	(Uzbekistan)	Vladimir Nazarov	Olympic Tashkent	Free	
	GK	(Uzbekistan)	Asrorbek Kenjayev	Chigatoy	Free	
	MF	(Uzbekistan)	Sharof Mukhiddinov	Sanat Naft Abadan F.C.	Free	
20 July 2023	FW	(Georgia (country))	Giorgi Nikabadze	FC Samgurali Tsqaltubo	€100,000	
31 July 2023	FW	(Georgia (country))	Bachana Arabuli	Macarthur FC	Free	
	DF	(Australia)	Tomislav Mrčela	Western Sydney Wanderers FC	Free	

=== Loans in ===
Date	Position	Nationality	Name	From	Fee	Ref.
	MF	(Uzbekistan)	Bilolkhon Toshmirzaev	Turon		

=== Out ===
Date	Position	Nationality	Name	To	Fee	Ref.
1 January 2023	MF	(Uzbekistan)	Sirozhiddin Kuziev	Kuching City F.C.	Free	
1 January 2023	MF	(Uzbekistan)	Abror Ismoilov	Navbahor	Free	
1 January 2023	MF	(Uzbekistan)	Sherzod Karimov	Free agent	Free	
1 January 2023	MF	(Uzbekistan)	Oybek Kilichev	Free agent	Free	
1 January 2023	MF	(Uzbekistan)	Salamat Qutiboyev	Aral	Free	
1 January 2023	DF	(Serbia)	Darko Stanojević	FK Mladost Lučani	Free	
1 January 2023	FW	(Uzbekistan)	Shakhzod Ubaydullaev	FC Shakhtyor Soligorsk	Free	
1 January 2023	GK	(Russia)	Yevgeni Konyukhov	Free agent	Free	
1 January 2023	GK	(Uzbekistan)	Mashkhur Mukhammadjonov	Mash'al Mubarek	Free	
20 June 2023	FW	(Uzbekistan)	Murodbek Bobojonov	Free agent	Free	
12 July 2023	MF	(Ukraine)	Yuriy Batyushyn	Sokol Sieniawa	Free	
12 July 2023	MF	(Uzbekistan)	Nurillo Tukhtasinov	Terengganu FC	Free	
12 July 2023	DF	(Ukraine)	Andriy Mishchenko	FC Dordoi Bishkek	Free	
10 July 2023	FW	(Georgia (country))	Toma Tabatadze	Navbahor	$70.000	

=== Loans out ===
Date	Position	Nationality	Name	From	Fee	Ref.
7 July 2023	FW	(Uzbekistan)	Fakhriddin Mukhammadov	Olympic Tashkent	Loans	

== Friendlies ==
11 January 2023 Exhibition game	Neftchi Fergana	0 – 0	Wisła Kraków	Turkey
UZT (UTC+5)		Report

15 January 2023 Exhibition game	Neftchi Fergana	0 – 0	Debreceni VSC	Turkey
UZT (UTC+5)		Report

19 January 2023 Exhibition game	Neftchi Fergana	2 – 0	FC Krumovgrad	Turkey
UZT (UTC+5)	Fakhriddin Mukhammadov; Anvarjon Gofurov	Report

20 January 2023 Exhibition game	Neftchi Fergana	2 – 1	Radomiak Radom	Turkey
UZT (UTC+5)	Oliver Sarkic 20'; Toma Tabatadze 49'	Report	85' (pen.)

1 February 2023 Exhibition game	Neftchi Fergana	3 – 1	Septemvri Sofia	Turkey
UZT (UTC+5)	Larin 40'; Khoshimov 50', 89'	Report	A. Chandov 70'

5 February 2023 Exhibition game	FC Alashkert	1 – 0	Neftchi Fergana	Turkey
UZT (UTC+5)	Goal	Report

13 February 2023 Exhibition game	Neftchi Fergana	1 – 0	Zorya Luhansk	Turkey
UZT (UTC+5)	Khoshimov 14'	Report

9 February 2023 Exhibition game	Neftchi Fergana	1 – 2	Kryvbas Kryvyi Rih	Turkey
UZT (UTC+5)	Adkhamzoda 49'	Report	Korablin 30'; Ustimenko 34'

16 February 2023 Exhibition game	Neftchi Fergana	3 – 2	Krylia Sovetov	Turkey
UZT (UTC+5)	Murodbek Bobojonov 6'; Umar Adkhamzoda 34'; Doniyor Valiev 44'	Report	Soldatenkov 63'; Soldatenkov 77'

16 February 2023 Exhibition game	Neftchi Fergana	2 – 0	FC Jetisu	Turkey
UZT (UTC+5)	Toma Tabatadze 44' (pen.); Nurillo Tukhtasinov 85'	Report

24 February 2023 Exhibition game	Bunyodkor	1 – 1	Neftchi Fergana	Tashkent
UZT (UTC+5)	Khakimov 70'	Report	Tabatadze 85'	Stadium: JAR Stadium

30 April 2023 Exhibition game	Neftchi Fergana	3 – 1	Andijon	Fergana
UZT (UTC+5)	Turopov 31'; Abdullaev 57'; Gulomov 80'	Report	Alijonov 43'	Stadium: Qirguli SC; Referee: Doston Mirzarakhimov

14 June 2023 Exhibition game	Neftchi Fergana	1 – 0	Kyrgyzstan U23	Fergana
UZT (UTC+5)	Tabatadze 10' (pen.)	Report		Stadium: Istiqlol stadium

18 June 2023 Exhibition game	Pakhtakor	1 – 2	Neftchi Fergana	Tashkent
UZT (UTC+5)	Turdimurodov 19'	Report	Tabatadze 28'; Tukhtasinov 42'	Stadium: Pakhtakor Central Stadium

6 July 2023 Exhibition game	Neftchi Fergana	0 – 0	Ural Yekaterinburg	Fergana
UZT (UTC+5)		Report		Stadium: Istiqlol Stadium

13 July 2023 Exhibition game	Ural Yekaterinburg	3 – 0	Neftchi Fergana	Yekaterinburg
UZT (UTC+5)	Ayupov 33'; Kashtanov 55'; Schettine 81'	Report		Stadium: Central Stadium (Yekaterinburg)

21 July 2023 Exhibition game	Neftchi Fergana	4 – 0	Eskhata Khujand	Fergana
UZT (UTC+5)	Nikabadze 5'; Own goal 5' (Owg); Abdullaev 68', 58'	Report		Stadium: Qirguli SK

25 July 2023 Exhibition game	Neftchi Fergana	1 – 0	Khujand	Fergana
UZT (UTC+5)	Abdullaev 46'	Report		Stadium: Istiqlol Stadium

20 August 2023 Exhibition game	Neftchi Fergana	6 – 1	Kokand 1912	Fergana
UZT (UTC+5)	Mukhiddinov 10'; Nikabadze 25'; Habib Sharipov 40' (avt); Abdullaev 52'; Musaev 70'; Gulomov 82'	Report	Ibrohim Muxtorov 90' (pen.)	Stadium: Qirguli SC; Referee: Shokhrukh Azamov

12 September 2023 Exhibition game	Neftchi Fergana	1 – 0	FC Alay	Fergana
UZT (UTC+5)	Nikabadze 19'	Report		Stadium: Qirguli SC; Referee: Sandzarbek Rakhmonov

16 September 2023 Exhibition game	Neftchi Fergana	1 – 1	Andijon	Fergana
UZT (UTC+5)	Bilolkhon Toshmirzaev 21'	Report	Shakhboz Erkinov 17'	Stadium: Qirguli SC; Referee: Doston Mirzarakhimov

15 October 2023 Exhibition game	Neftchi Fergana	1 – 1	FC Alay	Fergana
UZT (UTC+5)	Nikabadze 54'	Report	Shokhrukh Muratov 75'	Stadium: Istiqlol Stadium; Referee: Olim Tuychiboev

16 November 2023 Exhibition game	Neftchi Fergana	5 – 0	Eskhata Khujand	Fergana
UZT (UTC+5) 15:00	Gulyamov 30'; Nikabadze 33'; Khoshimov 46', 51'; Valiev 66'	Report		Stadium: Istiqlol Stadium; Attendance: 550; Referee: Olim Tuychiboev

== Competitions ==
=== Overview ===
Competition	First match	Last match	Starting round	Record							
Competition	First match	Last match	Starting round	Pld	W	D	L	GF	GA	GD	Win %
Super League	3 March 2023	1 December 2023	Matchday 1	26	11	12	3	33	18	+15	42.31
Uzbekistan Cup	26 April 2023		Group Stage	3	1	1	1	4	2	+2	33.33
Total				29	12	13	4	37	20	+17	41.38

Last updated: 24 October 2023
Source: Competitions

==== League table ====
Pos	Team	Pld	W	D	L	GF	GA	GD	Pts
3	Navbahor	26	14	5	7	44	19	+25	47
4	AGMK	26	13	7	6	43	34	+9	46
5	Neftchi	26	11	12	3	33	18	+15	45
6	Surkhon	26	11	7	8	28	24	+4	40 (Note: Ranked on head-to-head points: Surkhon 4, Andijon 1.)
7	Andijon	26	12	4	10	27	25	+2	40

Source: Uzbekistan Professional Football League
Rules for classification: 1) points; 2) head-to-head points; 3) head-to-head goal difference; 4) head-to-head away goals scored; 5) goal difference; 6) number of goals scored.

==== Results summary ====
Overall								Home						Away					
Pld	W	D	L	GF	GA	GD	Pts	W	D	L	GF	GA	GD	W	D	L	GF	GA	GD
26	11	12	3	33	18	+15	45	6	6	1	14	7	+7	5	6	2	19	11	+8

Last updated: 1 December 2023.
Source: See Results

==== Results by round ====
Round	1	2	3	4	5	6	7	8	9	10	11	12	13	14	15	16	17	18	19	20	21	22	23	24	25	26
Ground	A (Note: matchday 1)	H	A (Note: matchday 3)	H (Note: matchday 4)	A (Note: matchday 5)	H (Note: matchday 6)	A (Note: matchday 7)	H	A	H	A	A	H	H	A	H	A	H	A	H	A	H	A	H	H	A
Result	W	W	W	D	W	D	D	W	D	W	D	D	D	W	W	D	D	W	W	W	L	D	L	L	W	D
Position	1	2	1	1	1	1	1	3	3	3	3	4	3	3	2	3	3	3	3	3	4	4	5	5	5	5

Source: See Results
A = Away; H = Home; W = Win; D = Draw; L = Loss

==== Results ====
3 March 2023 1	Metallurg Bekabad	0 – 3	FC Neftchi Fergana	Bekabad
18:30 UZT (UTC+5)	Shodmonov (yellow card) 38'; Kasmynin (red card) 90'	Report	Gofurov 28'; Adkhamzoda 33'; Adkhamzoda 87'	Stadium: Metallurg Bekabad Stadium; Attendance: 6,623; Referee: Rakhimbek Karimov

10 March 2023 2	FC Neftchi Fergana	2 – 1	Paxtakor	Fergana
18:30 UZT (UTC+5)	Khoshimov (yellow card) 18'; Larin 52'; Ubaydullaev (yellow card) 59'; Tabatadze 81' (pen.)	Report	Hamrobekov (yellow card) 80'; Papava (yellow card) 85'; Tursunov 90+9' (yellow card) FT	Stadium: Istiqlol Stadium; Attendance: 17,103; Referee: Ilgiz Tantashev

18 March 2023 3	Sogdiana Jizzakh	0 – 2	Neftchi Fargʻona	Jizzax
UZT (UTC+5)		Report	Tukhtasinov 5' (yellow card) 67'; Khoshimov 39'	Stadium: Sogdiana Stadium; Attendance: 1015; Referee: Firdavs Norsafarov

31 March 2023 4	Neftchi Fergana	2 – 2	OKMK	Fergana
UZT (UTC+5)	Oleksiy Larin 31'; Ubaydullaev (yellow card) 47'; Tabatadze (yellow card) 59' Tukhtasinov 66'; Diyorjon Turapov (yellow card) 74'	Report	Martin Boakye 15'; Giyosov 40'; Oybek Rustamov (yellow card) 90'; Rakhmonov (yellow card) 90+7'	Stadium: Istiqlol stadium Attendance: 7720; Referee: Akobirkhuja Shukurulloev

8 April 2023 5	Andijon	0 – 2	Neftchi Fergana	Fergana
UZT (UTC+5)	Farkhodbek Bekmurodov (yellow card) 14'; Farkhodbek Sohibjonov (yellow card) 47'	Report	Diyorjon Turapov 9'; Ubaydullayev (yellow card) 13'; Tukhtasinov 20' (yellow card) 24' (red card) 64'; Tabatadze (yellow card) 45'	Stadium: Istiqlol stadium Attendance: 8450; Referee: Asker Najafaliev

17 April 2023 6	Neftchi Fergana	1 – 1	Turon	Fergana
UZT (UTC+5)	Khoshimov 50'	Report	Mukhtorov (yellow card) 76'; Beglarishvili (yellow card) 83'; Ngu Abega Enyang 90'; Chobanov (yellow card) 90+5'	Stadium: Istiqlo stadium Attendance: 5345; Referee: Sultonmurod Abdurakhmanov

21 April 2023 7	Bukhara	2 – 2	Neftchi Fergana	Buxoro
UZT (UTC+5)		Report	Khoshimov 32'; Zoir Dzhuraboyev (yellow card) 45+1'; Tukhtasinov (yellow card) 69'; Yuriy Batyushyn (yellow card) 80'; Izatilla Abdullaev 82'; Andriy Mishenko (yellow card) 89'; Mirzohid Gofurov (yellow card) 90+2'	Stadium: Buxoro Arena; Attendance: 8,725; Referee: Aziz Asimov

2 June 2023 8	Neftchi Fergana	2 – 1	Nasaf	Fergana
UZT (UTC+5)	Toma Tabatadze 51', 84'; Diyorjon Turapov (yellow card) 69'	Report	Khusniddin Alikulov (yellow card) 36'; Azizbek Amanov 68'	Stadium: Istiqlol stadium Attendance: 13,800; Referee: Shavkat Nasibullaev
Note: Match originally scheduled for 29 April 2023

7 May 2023 9	Surxon	2 – 2	Neftchi Fergana	Tashkent
UZT (UTC+5)	Asqarov (yellow card) 36'; Jumayev 45+2'; Nimely 77'	Report	Toma Tabatadze 16', 53'	Stadium: Paxtakor stadium Attendance: 557; Referee: Abdurashid Khudoyberganov

15 May 2023 10	Neftchi Fergana	1 – 0	Bunyodkor	Fergana
UZT (UTC+5)	Adhamzoda (yellow card) 33'; Toʻrayev (yellow card) 62'; Diyorjon Turapov 83'; Gulyamov (yellow card) 90+2'	Report	Ulmasaliyev (yellow card) 40'; Khakimov (yellow card) 52'; Abdumannopov (yellow card) 62'; Ivanović (yellow card) 87'	Stadium: Istiqlol stadioni Attendance: 14,414; Referee: Asker Najafaliyev

21 May 2023 11	Olympic Tashkent	0 – 0	Neftchi Fergana	Toshkent
UZT (UTC+5)	Mukhtorov (yellow card) 35'; Joʻraqoʻziyev (yellow card) 85'; Abdumajidov (yellow card) 90+6'	Report	Ubaydullaev (yellow card) 53'; Dzhuraboyev (yellow card) 62'	Stadium: Jar SC; Attendance: 4404; Referee: Ilgiz Tantashev

26 May 2023 12	Qizilqum	1 – 1	Neftchi Fergana	Navoiy
UZT (UTC+5)	Toshpulatov 42'; Juraev (yellow card) 55'; Vakhobov (yellow card) 67'	Report	Tabatadze 18'; Gofurov (yellow card) 33'; Bobojonov (yellow card) 83'; Abdullaev (yellow card) 90+2'	Stadium: Yoshlar SM; Attendance: 1254; Referee: Ibrohim Ismoilov

25 June 2023 13	Neftchi Fergana	0 – 0	Navbahor	Fergana
UZT (UTC+5)	Gofurov (yellow card) 90+1'	Report	Khashimov (yellow card) 66'; Yakhshiboev (yellow card) 86'	Stadium: Istiqlol stadium Attendance: 19,191; Referee: Akobirkhuja Shukurulloev

25 July 2023 14	Neftchi Fergana	1 – 0	Metallurg Bekabad	Fergana
UZT (UTC+5)	G.Gulyamov (yellow card) 11'; Gulomov 72'	Report		Stadium: Istiqlol stadium Attendance: 8345; Referee: Rustam Choriev

5 August 2023 15	Pakhtakor FC	0 – 1	Neftchi Fergana	Tashkent
UZT (UTC+5)	Shatskikh (red card) 52'; Yuriy Siyanov (yellow card) 72'; Turgunboev 86'	Report	Nikabadze (yellow card) 53'; Turapov 69' (yellow card) 80'; Adkhamzoda (yellow card) 80'; Gʻulomov (yellow card) 83'	Stadium: Pakhtakor Central Stadium; Attendance: 10,200; Referee: Firdavs Norsafarov

11 August 2023 16	Neftchi Fergana	0 – 0	Sogdiana Jizzakh	Fergana
20:00 UZT (UTC+5)	Nikabadze (yellow card) 32'; Khoshimov (yellow card) 70'; Abdullaev (yellow card) 90+5' (red card) 90+8'	Report	Zajmović (yellow card) 28'; Bošković (yellow card) 35'; Kakhramonov (yellow card) 38'; Sindarov (yellow card) 58'; Kenjayev (yellow card) 72'; Kolaković (yellow card) 86'; Mitrović (yellow card) 86'	Stadium: Istiqlol stadium Attendance: 15,107; Referee: Rustam Lutfullin

26 August 2023 17	OKMK	1 – 1	Neftchi Fergana	Olmaliq
19:00 UZT (UTC+5)	Sánchez (yellow card) 13'; Giyosov 43' (pen.); Tukhtakhujaev (yellow card) 57'	Report	Umar Adhamzoda (yellow card) 28'; Turaev (yellow card) 40'; Ubaydullaev 89'	Stadium: OKMK SM; Attendance: 4,256; Referee: Ilgiz Tantashev

31 August 2023 18	Neftchi Fergana	0 – 0	Andijon	Fergana
19:30 UZT (UTC+5)	Nikabadze	Report	Azimov (yellow card) 65'; Litovka (yellow card) 72'	Stadium: Istiqlol stadium Attendance: 19,316; Referee: Akobirkhuja Shukurullaev

9 November 2023 19	Turon	0 – 3	Neftchi Fargʻona	Yaypan
18:00 UZT (UTC+5)		Report	Gulomov 29' Mukhiddinov 56' (pen.), (yellow card) 45+2' (red card) 75' Abdullaev 90+1' (yellow card) 90+1' Nazarov (yellow card) 90+4'	Stadium: Uzbekistan stadium Attendance: 1,951; Referee: Olim To'ychiboyev
Note: Match originally scheduled for 22 September 2023

27 September 2023 20	Neftchi Fergana	3 – 0	Buxoro	Fergana
19:00 UZT (UTC+5)	Nikabadze 17', 24'; Gʻofurov (yellow card) 45+4'; Joʻraboyev (yellow card) 56'; Turopov (yellow card) 81'	Report	Norkhonov (yellow card) 45+4'; Muhammadjon Rahimov (yellow card) 73'; Ibrokhimov (yellow card) 80'	Stadium: Istiqlol stadium Attendance: 12,452; Referee: Asker Najafaliev

7 October 2023 21	Nasaf	2 – 0	Neftchi Fergana	Qarshi
17:00 UZT (UTC+5)	Jaba Jighauri 42'; Nematov (yellow card) 58'; Chávez (yellow card) 90+2' (red card) 90+5' (goal) 90+5'	Report	Gofurov (yellow card) 10'; Toshmirzaev (yellow card) 86'	Stadium: Nasaf Stadium; Attendance: 6,124; Referee: Temurbek Tokhtasinov

22 October 2023 22	Neftchi Fergana	1 – 1	Surkhon Termez	Fergana
19:00 UZT (UTC+5)	Ubaydullaev (yellow card) 90'; Adhamzoda 33'	Report	Khamidjonov (yellow card) 14' (goal) 45+1'; Shamsiev (yellow card) 90+6'; Karimov (yellow card) 90+8'	Stadium: Istiqlol stadium Attendance: 12107; Referee: Shavkat Nasibullaev

29 October 2023 23	Bunyodkor	2 – 1	Neftchi Fergana	Tashkent
17:00 UZT (UTC+5)	Igor Ivanović (yellow card) 8'; Avzabek Ulmasaliev (yellow card) 33'; Makhmudjon Mahammadjonov (yellow card) 45+4'; Jasur Khakimov 54' (yellow card) 79'; Usmonali Ismonaliev (yellow card) 62'; Shokhrukhbek Abdurakhmonov (yellow card) 62' (red card) 81'; Umid Sultonov 90+6'	Report	Anvarjon Gofurov (yellow card) 21'; Diyorjon Turapov (red card) 30'; Umar Adkhamzoda (yellow card) 48'; Zoir Dzhuraboyev 58'	Stadium: Jar stadium Attendance: 1320; Referee: Firdavs Norsafarov

3 November 2023 24	Neftchi Fergana	0 – 1	Olympic Tashkent	Fergana
18:15 UZT (UTC+5)	Nikabadze (yellow card) 2'; Khoshimov (yellow card) 53'; Ubaydullaev (yellow card) 60'	Report	Mirsaidov (yellow card) 30'; Ibragimov (yellow card) 64'; Odilov 79'; Jaloliddinov (yellow card) 84'	Stadium: Istiqlol stadium Attendance: 6,821; Referee: Abdurashid Khudoyberganov

23 November 2023 25	Neftchi Fergana	1 – 0	FC Qizilqum Zarafshon	Fergana
UZT (UTC+5)	Giorgi Nikabadze 17'	Report		Stadium: Istiqlol stadium Attendance: 5 866; Referee: Temur Tukhtasinov

1 December 2023 26	Navbahor Namangan	1 – 1	Neftchi Fergana	Namangan
UZT (UTC+5)	Milović 68'	Report	Gofurov 39'	Stadium: Markaziy Stadium; Attendance: 10 608; Referee: Sami Aljurays

=== Uzbek Cup ===
==== Group stage ====
Pos	Team	Pld	W	D	L	GF	GA	GD	Pts	Qualification
1	Bunyodkor	3	1	2	0	1	0	+1	5	Nimchorak final
2	Metallurg Bekabad	3	1	1	1	4	4	0	4	Nimchorak final
3	Neftchi Fergana	3	1	1	1	4	2	+2	4	
4	United Redbridge	3	0	2	1	2	5	−3	2	

Updated to match(es) played on 10 May 2023. Source: PFL

12 April 2023 Group stage 1st round	Neftchi Fergana	0 – 0	Bunyodkor	Fergana
18 : 00	Yuriy Batyushyn (yellow card) 26'; Umad Adkhamzoda (yellow card) 82'	Report		Stadium: Istiqlol Stadium; Attendance: 5512; Referee: Ibrokhim Ismoilov

10 May 2023 Group stage 2nd round	United Redbridge	0 – 3	Neftchi Fergana	Samarkand
19:00		Report	Izzatilla Abdullaev 37'; Yuriy Batyushyn 58'; Umar Adkhamzoda 89'	Stadium: Dinamo Samarkand Stadiumn; Attendance: 543; Referee: Ilgiz Tantashev

1 June 2023 Group stage 3rd round	Metallurg Bekabad	2 – 1	Neftchi Fergana	Bekabad
(UTC+6)	Husniddin Gafurov 4'; Zabikhillo Urinboev 38'	Report	Umar Adkhamzoda 90'	Stadium: Metallurg Bekabad Stadium; Attendance: 3510; Referee: Akhrol Riskullaev

== Squad statistics ==
As of match played 24 October 2023

=== Appearances and goals ===
No.	Pos	Nat	Player	Total		Super League		Uzbek Cup	
No.	Pos	Nat	Player	Apps	Goals	Apps	Goals	Apps	Goals
2	DF	(Tajikistan) TJK	Zoir Dzhuraboyev	26	1	24+1	1	1	0
77	DF	(Uzbekistan) UZB	Nodir Nematkhonov	2	0	0	0	2	0
5	DF	(Australia) AUS	Tomislav Mrčela	8	0	1+7	0	0	0
7	MF	(Uzbekistan) UZB	Umar Adkhamzoda	27	5	22+2	3	2+1	2
8	MF	(Uzbekistan) UZB	Sharof Mukhiddinov	10	1	9+1	1	0	0
9	FW	(Uzbekistan) UZB	Ulugbek Khoshimov	27	3	13+11	3	1+2	0
10	MF	(Uzbekistan) UZB	Sunnatilla Abdullazhonov	4	0	0+1	0	3	0
11	FW	(Uzbekistan) UZB	Izzatilla Abdullaev	21	3	3+15	2	3	1
12	GK	(Uzbekistan) UZB	Vladimir Nazarov	17	0	15	0	2	0
13	MF	(Uzbekistan) UZB	Lutfulla Turaev	16	0	13+2	0	1	0
17	MF	(Uzbekistan) UZB	Abdulloh Olimov	4	0	0+1	0	1+2	0
19	DF	(Uzbekistan) UZB	Mirzokhid Gofurov	26	2	26	2	0	0
20	DF	(Uzbekistan) UZB	Anvarjon Gofurov	17	0	15	0	2	0
21	DF	(Uzbekistan) UZB	Mukhsin Ubaydullaev	23	1	22	1	1	0
22	FW	(Georgia (country)) GEO	Giorgi Nikabadze	12	3	12	3	0	0
23	MF	(Uzbekistan) UZB	Diyorjon Turapov	26	4	14+10	4	1+1	0
24	MF	(Uzbekistan) UZB	Gulyamkhaydar Gulyamov	29	0	24+2	0	1+2	0
24	DF	(Ukraine) UKR	Oleksiy Larin	17	2	14+1	2	1+1	0
28	MF	(Uzbekistan) UZB	Fozil Musaev	16	0	6+7	0	2+1	0
40	FW	(Georgia (country)) GEO	Bachana Arabuli	10	0	6+4	0	0	0
45	GK	(Uzbekistan) UZB	Akbar Turaev	12	0	11	0	1	0
66	DF	(Uzbekistan) UZB	Doniyor Valiev	4	0	0+4	0	0	0
70	DF	(Uzbekistan) UZB	Abbos Gulomov	26	2	7+16	2	1+2	0
77	MF	(Uzbekistan) UZB	Bilolkhon Toshmirzaev	10	0	5+5	0	0	0
Players away on loan:
Players who left Neftchi Fergana during the season:
8	DF	(Ukraine) UKR	Andriy Mishchenko	5	0	2+1	0	2	0
8	MF	(Ukraine) UKR	Yuriy Batyushyn	9	1	0+6	0	3	1
8	MF	(Uzbekistan) UZB	Nurillo Tukhtasinov	13	3	11+2	3	0	0
21	FW	(Georgia (country)) GEO	Toma Tabatadze	15	6	13	6	0+2	0
21	FW	(Uzbekistan) UZB	Murodbek Bobojonov	9	0	0+6	0	2+1	0

=== Goal scorers ===
Place	Position	Nation	Number	Name	Super League	Uzbekistan Cup	Total
1	FW	(Georgia (country))	22	Toma Tabatadze	6	0	6
2	MF	(Uzbekistan)	7	Umar Adkhamzoda	3	2	5
3	MF	(Uzbekistan)	23	Diyorjon Turapov	4	0	4
4	FW	(Uzbekistan)	9	Ulugbek Khoshimov	3	0	3
4	MF	(Uzbekistan)	8	Nurillo Tukhtasinov	3	0	3
4	FW	(Uzbekistan)	11	Izzatilla Abdullaev	2	1	3
4	FW	(Georgia (country))	22	Giorgi Nikabadze	3	0	3
5	DF	(Ukraine)	26	Oleksiy Larin	2	0	2
5	DF	(Uzbekistan)	70	Abbos Gulomov	2	0	2
6	DF	(Tajikistan)	2	Zoir Dzhuraboyev	1	0	1
6	DF	(Uzbekistan)	19	Mirzokhid Gofurov	1	0	1
6	MF	(Uzbekistan)	8	Sharof Mukhiddinov	1	0	1
6	DF	(Uzbekistan)	21	Mukhsin Ubaydullaev	1	0	1
6	DF	(Uzbekistan)	4	Yuriy Batyushyn	0	1	1
				TOTALS	31	4	36

=== Clean sheets ===
Place	Position	Nation	Number	Name	Super League	Uzbekistan Cup	Total
1	GK	(Uzbekistan)	12	Vladimir Nazarov	9	2	11
2	GK	(Uzbekistan)	45	Akbar Turaev	4	0	4
				TOTALS	13	2	15

=== Disciplinary record ===
Number	Nation	Position	Name	Super League		Uzbekistan Cup		Total	
Number	Nation	Position	Name	Booked	Sent off (straight red)	Booked	Sent off (straight red)	Booked	Sent off (straight red)
2	(Tajikistan)	MF	Zoir Dzhuraboyev	3	0	0	0	3	0
7	(Uzbekistan)	DF	Umar Adkhamzoda	4	0	1	0	5	0
8	(Uzbekistan)	DF	Sharof Mukhiddinov	2	1	0	0	2	1
9	(Uzbekistan)	MF	Ulugbek Khoshimov	3	0	0	0	3	0
11	(Uzbekistan)	DF	Izzatilla Abdullaev	4	1	0	0	4	1
11	(Uzbekistan)	DF	Vladimir Nazarov	2	0	0	0	2	0
13	(Uzbekistan)	FW	Lutfulla Turaev	2	0	0	0	2	0
19	(Uzbekistan)	FW	Mirzokhid Gofurov	0	0	0	3	0	
20	(Uzbekistan)	DF	Anvarjon Gofurov	3	0	0	0	3	0
21	(Uzbekistan)	MF	Mukhsin Ubaydullaev	8	0	0	0	8	0
22	(Georgia (country))	FW	Giorgi Nikabadze	4	0	0	0	4	0
23	(Uzbekistan)	FW	Diyorjon Turapov	3	1	0	0	3	1
24	(Uzbekistan)	MF	Gulyamkhaydar Gulyamov	3	0	0	0	3	0
28	(Uzbekistan)	DF	Fozil Musaev	0	1	0	3	0	
70	(Uzbekistan)	DF	Abbos Gulomov	1	0	0	0	1	0
77	(Uzbekistan)	DF	Bilolkhon Toshmirzaev	2	0	0	0	2	0
Players who left Neftchi Fergana during the season:
8	(Uzbekistan)	MF	Nurillo Tukhtasinov	4	1	0	0	4	1
4	(Ukraine)	DF	Yuriy Batyushyn	1	0	2	0	3	0
5	(Ukraine)	MF	Andriy Mishchenko	1	0	0	0	1	0
22	(Georgia (country))	MF	Toma Tabatadze	2	0	0	0	2	0
35	(Uzbekistan)	GK	Murodbek Bobojonov	1	0	0	0	1	0
			TOTALS	58	4	4	0	62	4
