= List of FC Neftchi Fergana players =

FC Neftchi Fergana is an Uzbek professional football club based in Fergana, Uzbekistan. The club was formed on 1962 in Fergana. From 1962 to 1991 Neftchi played in different leagues of USSR. From 1992 club has played in the highest Uzbek Football Division, Uzbek League. The club plays its matches at Istiklol Stadium.

== List Foreign players ==
As of 08 December 2023

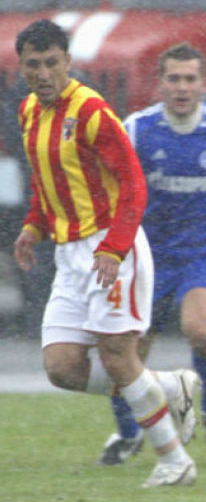
Rakhmatullo Fuzaylov

Name	Nat	Position	Neftchi career	Appearances	Goals
Akmal Kholmatov	(Tajikistan)	MF	1996–2008 2014–2016	351	84
Ilya Kovalenko	(Kyrgyzstan)	FW	1998–2009	189	45
Rakhmatullo Fuzaylov	(Tajikistan)	DF	1996–1997	50	0
Vyacheslav Knyazev	(Tajikistan)	DF	1996–2001	48	10
Darko Stanojevic	(Serbia)	DF	2021–2022	32	0
Yevgeni Cheremisin	(Russia)	GK	2015	30	0
Oleksiy Larin	(Ukraine)	DF	2022–	30	3
Zoir Dzhuraboyev	(Tajikistan)	DF	2023–	26	1
Aleksandar Ješić	(Serbia)	MF	2021–2022	21	8
Marko Obradović	(Montenegro)	FW	2021	19	13
Adrian Cașcaval	(Moldova)	DF	2015	15	2
Alexandru Onica	(Moldova)	MF	2014	15	1
Toma Tabatadze	(Georgia (country))	FW	2023	15	6
Andriy Mishchenko	(Ukraine)	DF	2022–2023	15	0
Dzmitry Kamarowski	(Belarus)	FW	2017	12	2
Giorgi Nikabadze	(Georgia (country))	FW	2023–	12	3
Bachana Arabuli	(Georgia (country))	FW	2023–	9	0
Marko Šarić	(Serbia)	FW	2022	9	0
Danijel Stojkovic	(Serbia)	DF	2022	9	0
Yuriy Batyushyn	(Ukraine)	MF	2022	9	1
Sergey Kontsevoy	(Belarus)	DF	2017	8	0
Tomislav Mrčela	(Australia)	DF	2023–	8	0
Yevgeni Konyukhov	(Russia)	GK	2022	8	0
Vitaliy Myrnyi	(Ukraine)	GK	2018	9	0
Levan Gvazava	(Georgia (country))	MF	2014	7	0
Valeri Sheremetov	(Russia)	GK	1992	7	0
Daýançgylyç Urazow	(Turkmenistan)	FW	2006	5	2
Terentiy Lutsevich	(Belarus)	DF	2017	5	0
Vyacheslav Sushkin	(Russia)	MF	2018	2	0
Karen Abramov	(Armenia)	MF	2017	2	0
Igor Petkovic	(Montenegro)	DF	2015	1	0
