= 2024 FC Neftchi Fergana season =

Neftchi Fergana
2024 season
- CEO: Mansur Tashmatov
- Manager: Vitaly Levchenko
- Uzbek League
- Uzbekistan Cup
Home colours	Away colours

The 2024 season is the 62nd season in the history of the FC Neftchi Fergana team. In the 33rd season in the history of Uzbek football, it is the 3rd season in a row in the top league of Uzbek football. FC Neftchi Fergana will participate in the current season of the Cup of Uzbekistan in addition to the domestic championship.

== Summary ==
=== Pre-season ===
The club said goodbye to Ulugbek Khoshimov, who came to the team in the 2021 season and played in the club for 3 seasons, and signed a contract with the Surkhon club of Termez. Therefore, the Neftchi team said goodbye to the players due to the termination of the contract with goalkeeper Vladimir Nazarov and defender Nodir Nematkhonov. In the 2023 season, the contract with Zoir Dzhuraboyev, who was invited from the Surkhon club of Termez, was extended. At the beginning of the 2023 season, the current contract with Anvarjon Gofurov, who returned to the club from the Metallurg Bekobad team and is a pupil of the club's academy, was extended. Mirzokhid Gafurov, who was invited to the team in the 2022 season and is the second captain of the club, extended the contract of the Neftchi team. The contract with Gulyamkhaydar Gulyamov, who was invited to the team in the 2023 season and played the most time in the club, was extended. On December 8, 2023, he signed a contract with Manuchehr Safarov, the right wing defender of the national team of Tajikistan, whose contract with Lokomotiv Tashkent ended. At the end of the season, three more players, Izzatilla Abdullaev and Abdullokh Olimov, who played in the team for three seasons, and Sunnatilla Abdullajonov, who played in the Fergana team for two seasons, ended their contracts and left the team. Neftchi FC will be in pre-season training in Turkey from January 7 to February 24. The Neftchi club has extended the current contract with the head coach of the U-21 team Aziz Alijonov. The contract with Neftchi goalkeeper Asror Kenjaev has been extended for two years. Neftchi team plans to play 5 friendly matches in Turkey in the first round.

== Squad ==
As of match played 1 March 2024

No.	Name	Nationality	Position	Date of birth (Age)	Signed from	Signed in	Contract ends	Apps.	Goals
Goalkeepers
1	Botirali Ergashev	(Uzbekistan)	GK	25 June 1995 (age 31)	AGMK	2024	2024	0	0
16	Asrorbek Kenjayev	(Uzbekistan)	GK	15 July 2004 (age 22)	Chigatoy	2023	2025	0	0
35	Sanjar Kuvvatov	(Uzbekistan)	GK	8 January 1990 (age 36)	Pakhatakor	2024	2024	0	0
45	Akbar Turaev	(Uzbekistan)	GK	27 August 1989 (age 37)	Surkhon Termez	2021	2024	46	0
Defenders
2	Zoir Dzhuraboyev	(Tajikistan)	DF	16 September 1998 (age 28)	Surkhon Termez	2023	Dec 31, 2025	26	1
3	Bojan Ciger	(Serbia)	DF	18 June 1994 (age 32)	Kedah Darul Aman	2024	2024	0	0
14	Khurshidbek Mukhtorov	(Uzbekistan)	DF	6 April 1994 (age 32)	Turon	2024	2024	0	0
19	Mirzokhid Gofurov	(Uzbekistan)	DF	24 August 1988 (age 38)	Navbahor	2022	Dec 31, 2024	55	3
20	Anvarjon Gofurov	(Uzbekistan)	DF	28 June 1995 (age 31)	Metallurg Bekabad	2023	Dec 31, 2024	76	0
21	Mukhsin Ubaydullaev	(Uzbekistan)	DF	15 July 1994 (age 32)	Qizilqum	2022	Dec 31, 2024	111	1
55	Manuchekhr Safarov	(Tajikistan)	DF	31 May 2001 (age 25)	Lokomotiv Tashkent	2024	31 december 2025	0	0
66	Doniyor Valiev	(Uzbekistan)	DF	14 September 2003 (age 23)	Academy	2021	2024	4	0
Midfielders
7	Jasurbek Jaloliddinov	(Uzbekistan)	DF	15 May 2002 (age 24)	Olympic Tashkent	2024	2024	0	0
8	Cătălin Carp	(Moldova)	MF	20 October 1993 (age 32)	UTA Arad	2024	2024	0	0
11	Javokhir Kahramonov	(Uzbekistan)	MF	21 March 1996 (age 30)	Sogdiana Jizzakh	2024	Dec 31, 2024	0	0
17	Sanjar Kodirkulov	(Uzbekistan)	MF	2 April 2004 (age 22)	Lokomotiv Tashkent	2023	2024	0	0
23	Diyorjon Turapov	(Uzbekistan)	MF	9 July 1994 (age 32)	Navbahor	2023	2023	26	4
24	Gulyamkhaydar Gulyamov	(Uzbekistan)	MF	21 December 1990 (age 35)	Lokomotiv	2023	Dec 31, 2024	29	0
70	Abbosbek Gulomov	(Uzbekistan)	MF	5 July 1998 (age 28)	Navbahor	2022	2024	48	3
77	Bilolkhon Toshmirzaev	(Uzbekistan)	MF	8 August 1997 (age 29)	Turon	2023	2024	9	0
Forwards
9	Khusayin Norchaev	(Uzbekistan)	FW	6 February 2002 (age 24)	Alania Vladikavkaz	2024	Dec 31, 2024	0	0
10	Shokhruz Norkhonov	(Uzbekistan)	FW	13 April 1993 (age 33)	Sogdiana Jizzakh	2024	Dec 31, 2024	0	0
18	Mihai Roman	(Romania)	FW	31 May 1992 (age 34)	Petrolul Ploiești	2024	Dec 31, 2024	0	0
28	Bekhruz Oblakulov	(Uzbekistan)	FW	15 May 2004 (age 22)	Mash'al Mubarel	2024	Dec 31, 2026	0	0
99	Effiong Nsungusi	(Nigeria)	FW	4 November 1999 (age 26)	HB Køge	2024	Dec 31, 2025	0	0
Players who left during the season

== Transfers ==
=== In ===
Date	Position	Nationality	Name	From	Fee	Ref.
6 December 2023	FW	(Uzbekistan)	Shokhruz Norkhonov	Bukhara	Free	
7 December 2023	FW	(Uzbekistan)	Sanjar Kodirkulov	Lokomotiv Tashkent	Free	

=== Loans in ===
Date	Position	Nationality	Name	From	Fee	Ref.
	MF	(Uzbekistan)	Bilolkhon Toshmirzaev	Turon		

=== Out ===
Date	Position	Nationality	Name	To	Fee	Ref.
6 December 2023	MF	(Uzbekistan)	Nodir Nematkhonov	Surkhon Termez	Free	
6 December 2023	FW	(Uzbekistan)	Ulugbek Khoshimov	Surkhon Termez	Free	
2 December 2023	GK	(Uzbekistan)	Vladimir Nazarov	Free agent	Free	
3 December 2023	GK	(Uzbekistan)	Fozil Musaev	Free agent	Free	
19 December 2023	FW	(Uzbekistan)	Izzatilla Abdullaev	Free agent	Free	
19 December 2023	MF	(Uzbekistan)	Abdullokh Olimov	Free agent	Free	
19 December 2023	FW	(Uzbekistan)	Sunnatilla Abdullajonov	Free agent	Free	

=== Loans Out ===
Date	Position	Nationality	Name	From	Fee	Ref.
7 July 2023	FW	(Uzbekistan)	Fakhriddin Mukhammadov	Olympic Tashkent	Loans	

== Friendlies ==
13 December 2023 Exhibition game	Neftchi Fergana	1 – 2	Dinamo Samarqand	Uzbekistan, Tashkent
UZT (UTC+5)	Oblakulov 22'	Report	Elnur Saidmurodov 17'; Dusan Mijic 25'

13 January 2024 Exhibition game	Neftchi Fergana	0 – 0	HBS	Turkey
TRT (UTC+3)		Report

17 January 2024 Exhibition game	Neftchi Fergana	1 – 1	Khabarovsk	Turkey
TRT (UTC+3)	Jaloliddinov 20'	Report	Yao Jean Charles 12'

21 January 2024 Exhibition game	Neftchi Fergana	1 – 0	Leningradets	Antalya Turkey
TRT (UTC+3)	Kodirkulov 7'			Stadium: Training stadium

26 January 2024 Exhibition game	Neftchi Fergana	0 – 3	Yelimay Semey	Turkey
TRT (UTC+3)		Report

26 January 2024 Exhibition game	Neftchi Fergana	0 – 1	Lechia	Antalya Turkey
TRT (UTC+3)		Report

3 February 2024 Exhibition game	Neftchi Fergana	0 – 1	Akhmat Grozny	Antalya Turkey
TRT (UTC+3)		Report	Berisha 2'	Stadium: Eco stadium

7 February 2024 Exhibition game	Neftchi Fergana	3 – 1	Zhetysu	Antalya Turkey
TRT (UTC+3)	Norchaev 50', 57'; O.G	Report	Goal	Stadium: Eco stadium

11 February 2024 Exhibition game	Neftchi Fergana	2 – 0	Kolkheti-1913 Poti	Antalya Turkey
TRT (UTC+3)	Roman 10' (pen.); Toshmirzaev 54'	Report		Stadium: Eco stadium

15 February 2024 Exhibition game	Neftchi Fergana	1 – 0	Sochi	Antalya Turkey
TRT (UTC+3)	Norchaev 10'	Report		Stadium: Eco stadium

20 February 2024 Exhibition game	Neftchi Fergana	2 – 2	Sochi	Antalya Turkey
TRT (UTC+3)	Jaloliddinov 5'; Oblakulov 80'	Report	Guarirapa 62'; Zaika 85'	Stadium: Eco stadium

22 February 2024 Exhibition game	Neftchi Fergana	2 – 1	Tyumen	Antalya Turkey
TRT (UTC+3)	Norkhonov 41'; Gulyamov 63'		Samoylov 33'	Stadium: Eco stadium

22 February 2024 Exhibition game	Neftchi Fergana	1 – 1	Atyrau	Antalya Turkey
TRT (UTC+3)	Norchaev 52'		Signevich 89'	Stadium: Eco stadium

20 March 2024 Exhibition game	Neftchi Fergana	2 – 3	Kyrgyzstan U20	Fergana Uzbekistan
UZT (UTC+5)	Norkhonov 17'; Gafurov 78'	Report	Nematov 61', 75'; Tashbaltaev 87'	Stadium: Istiqlol Stadium

24 March 2024 Exhibition game	Neftchi Fergana	3 – 0	Khujand	Fergana Uzbekistan
UZT (UTC+5)	Roman 33'; Gulyamov 47'; Toshmirzaev 81'	Report		Stadium: Istiqlol Stadium

6 June 2024 Exhibition game	Neftchi Fergana	2 – 1	Andijon	Neftchi Sport Complex
UZT (UTC+5)	Gafurov 50'; Kodirkulov 86'	Report	Turdimurodov 5'	Attendance: Fergana; Referee: Shokhrukh Azamov

10 June 2024 Exhibition game	Neftchi Fergana	2 – 0	Alay	Istiqlol Stadium
UZT (UTC+5)	Gafurov 21'; Valiev 46'			Attendance: Fergana

17 July 2024 Exhibition game	Neftchi Fergana	2 – 0	Khujand	Fergana Uzbekistan
UZT (UTC+5)	Kakhramonov 25'; Norkhonov 49'	Report		Stadium: Neftchi Sport Complex; Referee: Murodkhon Azazmjonov

21 July 2024 Exhibition game	Neftchi Fergana	5 – 1	Khosilot	Neftchi Sport Complex
UZT (UTC+5)	Norkhonov 6', 14'; Ruziev 43'; Kodirkulov 54'; Amonov 77'		Boboev 75'	Stadium: Istiqlol Stadium; Referee: Abubakir Khasanov

== Competitions ==
=== Overview ===
Competition	First match	Last match	Starting round	Final position	Record							
Competition	First match	Last match	Starting round	Final position	Pld	W	D	L	GF	GA	GD	Win %
Super League	3 March 2023	30 November 2024	Matchday 1	5th place	26	16	5	5	41	25	+16	61.54
Uzbekistan Cup	26 April 2023	4 July 2024	Group Stage	Round of 16	4	2	1	1	8	3	+5	50.00
Total					30	18	6	6	49	28	+21	60.00

Source: Competitions

==== League table ====
Pos	Team	Pld	W	D	L	GF	GA	GD	Pts
3	Sogdiana	26	12	7	7	41	29	+12	43
4	Navbahor	26	11	10	5	42	31	+11	43
5	Neftchi	26	11	10	5	32	24	+8	43
6	Pakhtakor	26	11	5	10	42	37	+5	38
7	Surkhon	26	10	6	10	30	31	−1	36

Source: Uzbekistan Professional Football League
Rules for classification: 1) points; 2) head-to-head points; 3) head-to-head goal difference; 4) head-to-head away goals scored; 5) goal difference; 6) number of goals scored.

==== Results summary ====
Overall								Home						Away					
Pld	W	D	L	GF	GA	GD	Pts	W	D	L	GF	GA	GD	W	D	L	GF	GA	GD
26	11	10	5	32	24	+8	43	6	5	2	20	16	+4	5	5	3	12	8	+4

Last updated: 30 November 2024.
Source: See Results

==== Results by round ====
Round	1	2	3	4	5	6	7	8	9	10	11	12	13	14	15	16	17	18	19	20	21	22	23	24	25	26
Ground	A	A	H	A	H	A	H	A	H	A	H	A	H	H	H	A	H	A	H	A	H	A	H	A	H	A
Result	W	W	W	L	L	D	D	L	W	W	D	L	D	L	W	D	W	D	D	D	D	W	W	D	W	W
Position	5	2	1	1	3	6	7	8	8	5	5	6	8	8	6	7	6	5	6	5	5	5	5	6	5	5

Source: See Results
A = Away; H = Home; W = Win; D = Draw; L = Loss

==== Results ====
2 March 2023 1	Sogdiana Jizzakh	1 – 2	FC Neftchi Fergana	Jizzakh
19:15 UZT (UTC+5) 19:00	Doriev 93'	Report	Nsungusi 14', 60'	Stadium: Sogdiana Stadium; Attendance: 1 810; Referee: Asker Najafaliev

10 March 2023 2	Dinamo Samarqand	0 – 1	FC Neftchi Fergana	Jizzakh
17:15 UZT (UTC+5) 19:00		Report	Gulomov 51'	Stadium: Sogdiana Stadium; Attendance: 1 672; Referee: Firdavs Norsafarov

15 March 2023 3	FC Neftchi Fergana	1 – 0	Metallurg Bekabad	Fargana
18:35 UZT (UTC+5) 19:00	Carp 89'	Report		Stadium: Istiqlol Stadium; Referee: Gayrat Juraev

31 March 2023 4	Olympic Tashkent	1 – 0	FC Neftchi Fergana	Tashkent
18:35 UZT (UTC+5) 19:00	Odilov 90+2'	Report		Stadium: JAR Stadium

6 May 2024 6	Qizilqum	1 – 1	FC Neftchi Fergana	Qarshi
UZT (UTC+5) 18:00	Jurabekov 90+3'	Report	Norkhonov 16'	Stadium: Markaziy stadium Attendance: 320; Referee: Ilgiz Tantashev

12 May 2024 7	FC Neftchi Fergana	2 – 2	Andijon	Fergana
UZT (UTC+5) 19:00	Toshmirzayev 84'; Jaloliddinov 90+4' (pen.)	Report	Abdumannonov 16'; Sokhibjonov 53'	Stadium: Istiqlol Stadium; Attendance: 19 867; Referee: Aziz Asimov

19 May 2024 8	Navbahor	1 – 0	FC Neftchi Fergana	Namangan
UZT (UTC+5) 19:00	Ivanovic 90+4'	Report		Stadium: Markaziy Stadium; Attendance: 22350; Referee: Aziz Asimov

26 May 2024 9	FC Neftchi Fergana	1 – 0	OKMK	Fergana
UZT (UTC+5) 19:00	Jaloliddinov 53'	Report		Stadium: Istiqlol Stadium; Attendance: 15120; Referee: Abdurashid Khudoyberganov

1 June 2024 10	Bunyodkor	0 – 3	FC Neftchi Fergana	Tashkent
UZT (UTC+5) 19:30		Report	Nsungusi 25', 31'; Norchaev 90'	Stadium: Bunyodkor; Attendance: 3654; Referee: Ravshan Abduvohidov

15 June 2024 11	FC Neftchi Fergana	1 – 1	Surkhon	Fergana
UZT (UTC+5)	Norchaev 28'	Report	Khamidzhonov 38'	Stadium: Istiqlol Stadium; Attendance: 10,200; Referee: Shavkat Nasibullaev

20 June 2024 12	Nasaf	1 – 0	FC Neftchi Fergana	Qarshi
UZT (UTC+5)	Ubaydullaev 45+1' (o.g.)	Report		Stadium: Markaziy stadium Attendance: 7456; Referee: Akobir Shukrullayev

27 June 2024 13	FC Neftchi Fergana	1 – 1	Lokomotiv Tashkent	Fergana
UZT (UTC+5)	Norchaev 49'	Report	Abdunabiev 74'	Stadium: Istiqlol Stadium; Attendance: 10,922; Referee: Nayim Qosimov

1 July 2024 5	FC Neftchi Fergana	0–2	Pakhtakor	Fergana
20:30 UZT (UTC+5)	Sanjar Qodirkulov (yellow card) 4'	Report	Umar Adkhamzoda (yellow card) 14'; Khamdamov 16'; Abdumannopov 40'; Alijonov (yellow card) 50'; Kholmatov (yellow card) 60'; Shakhzod Azmiddinov (yellow card) 63'	Stadium: Istiqlol Stadium; Referee: (Uzbekistan) Asker Nadjafaliev

== Squad statistics ==
As of match played March 2024

=== Appearances and goals ===
No.	Pos	Nat	Player	Total		Super League		Uzbek Cup	
No.	Pos	Nat	Player	Apps	Goals	Apps	Goals	Apps	Goals
2	DF	(Uzbekistan) UZB	Botirali Ergashev	8	-6	6	-5	2	-1
2	DF	(Tajikistan) TJK	Zoir Dzhuraboyev	11	0	10	0	1	0
3	DF	(Uzbekistan) UZB	Jaloliddin Jumaboev	3	0	1	0	2	0
5	DF	(Serbia) SRB	Bojan Ciger	12	0	8	0	4	0
7	MF	(Uzbekistan) UZB	Jasurbek Jaloliddinov	10	2	10	2	0	0
8	MF	(Moldova) MDA	Cătălin Carp	15	1	11	1	4	0
9	FW	(Uzbekistan) UZB	Khusayin Norchaev	11	3	11	3	0	0
10	FW	(Uzbekistan) UZB	Shokhruz Norkhonov	10	3	7	1	3	2
11	MF	(Uzbekistan) UZB	Javokhir Kahramonov	16	0	13	0	3	0
14	DF	(Uzbekistan) UZB	Khurshid Mukhtorov	11	0	7	0	4	0
16	GK	(Uzbekistan) UZB	Asrorbek Kenjaev	0	0	0	0	0	0
17	MF	(Uzbekistan) UZB	Sanjar Kodirkulov	13	2	9	0	4	2
18	FW	(Romania) ROU	Mihai Roman	13	1	9	0	4	1
19	DF	(Uzbekistan) UZB	Mirzokhid Gofurov	10	0	7	0	3	0
20	DF	(Uzbekistan) UZB	Anvarjon Gofurov	15	0	12	0	3	0
21	DF	(Uzbekistan) UZB	Mukhsin Ubaydullaev	10	0	8	0	2	0
23	MF	(Uzbekistan) UZB	Diyorjon Turapov	13	1	9	0	4	1
24	MF	(Uzbekistan) UZB	Gulyamkhaydar Gulyamov	9	1	6	0	3	1
24	FW	(Uzbekistan) UZB	Behruz Oblakulov	2	0	1	0	1	0
35	GK	(Uzbekistan) UZB	Sanjar Kuvvatov	9	-8	7	-6	2	-2
45	GK	(Uzbekistan) UZB	Akbar Turaev	0	0	0	0	0	0
55	MF	(Tajikistan) TJK	Manuchekhr Safarov	12	0	11	0	1	0
66	DF	(Uzbekistan) UZB	Doniyor Valiev	2	0	0	0	2	0
70	DF	(Uzbekistan) UZB	Abbos Gulomov	17	2	13	1	4	1
77	MF	(Uzbekistan) UZB	Bilolkhon Toshmirzaev	16	1	12	1	4	0
77	FW	(Uzbekistan) UZB	Effiong Nsungusi	16	4	12	4	4	0
Players away on loan:
Players who left Neftchi Fergana during the season:

=== Goal scorers ===
Place	Position	Nation	Number	Name	Super League	Uzbekistan Cup	Total
1	FW	(Nigeria)	99	Effiong Nsungusi	2	0	2
2	DF	(Moldova)	2	Cătălin Carp	1	0	1
2	DF	(Uzbekistan)	70	Abbos Gulomov	1	0	1
				TOTALS	4	0	4

=== Clean sheets ===
Place	Position	Nation	Number	Name	Super League	Uzbekistan Cup	Total
1	GK	(Uzbekistan)	12	Sanjar Kuvvatov	2	0	2
				TOTALS	2	0	2
