= Umar Adkhamzoda =

Uzbek footballer

Umar Adhamzoda
Personal information
- Full name: Umar Adhamzoda
- Date of birth: April 4, 1998 (age 28)
- Place of birth: Tashkent, Uzbekistan
- Height: 1.75 m (5 ft 9 in)
- Positions: Defender; midfielder

Team information
- Current team: Navbahor
- Number: 22

Youth career
- 2013-2015: Pakhtakor Academy
- 2015-2017: Lokomotiv Tashkent Academy

Senior career*
| Years | Team | Apps | (Gls) |
| 2017-2019 | Lokomotiv Tashkent | - | (-) |
| 2020 | Istiqlol | 7 | (0) |
| 2020-2023 | Neftchi | 62 | (3) |
| 2024-2025 | Pakhtakor | 44 | (3) |
| 2026- | Navbahor | 13 | (0) |

International career
| 2024- | Uzbekistan national football team | 0 | (0) |
- * Club domestic league appearances and goals as of 29 July 2026

Umar Adhamzoda (Uzbek: Umar Adhamzoda; born 4 April 1998 in Tashkent) is an Uzbek professional footballer who plays for Navbahor. A versatile player, he can operate as a central defender, right-back, or winger.

== Career ==
Umar Adhamzoda's first coach was Abdusattor Rahimov. Early part of his career in the youth teams of Pakhtakor and Lokomotiv Tashkent, as well as for Lokomotiv BFK.

In the 2020 season, Adkhamzoda joined Neftchi, having previously been a member of FC Istiqlol Fergana. In his early seasons with the Fergana-based club, competed in Uzbekistan Pro League and contributed to the team's promotion back to Uzbekistan Super League.

The 2023 season became the most productive of his career. In Uzbekistan Super League and Uzbekistan Cup matches, scored 5 goals in 27 appearances. On 21 December 2023, Neftchi announced that Adkhamzoda had been transferred to Pakhtakor.

== Honours ==
Neftchi

- Uzbekistan Pro League champion: 2021
- Uzbekistan Pro League runner-up: 2020

Pakhtakor

- Uzbekistan Cup winner: 2025
