= 2023 Uzbekistan Cup =

Coca Cola Uzbekistan Cup

Tournament details
- Country: Uzbekistan
- Dates: 24 March – 12 November 2023
- Teams: 30

Final positions
- Champions: Nasaf
- Runners-up: AGMK

Tournament statistics
- Matches played: 66
- Goals scored: 226 (3.42 per match)
- Attendance: 90,677 (1,374 per match)
- Top goal scorer(s): Murodxo‘ja Jabborov (5); Alisher Odilov (5)
- All statistics correct as of 3 September 2023.

The 2023 Uzbekistan Cup (Uzbek: Futbol boʻyicha 2023-yilgi Oʻzbekiston Kubogi) was the 31st season of the annual Uzbekistan Cup, the knockout football cup competition of Uzbekistan. The cup winner qualifies for a place in the 2024–25 AFC Champions League Two.

== Participating clubs ==
This season, 38 teams from the of Uzbekistan Football Leagues system was participated. For the first time in history, teams from Uzbekistan First League, the 3rd level league of Uzbekistan, took part in the Uzbekistan Cup. The following teams entered the competition:

Uzbekistan Super League all 14 clubs of the 2023 season	Uzbekistan Pro League; 10 clubs of the 2023 season	Uzbekistan First League; 8 clubs of the 2023 season
AGMK; Andijon; Bunyodkor; Buxoro; Metallurg Bekabad; Nasaf; Navbahor Namangan; Neftchi Fergana; Olympic Tashkent; Pakhtakor Tashkent; Qizilqum Zarafshon; Sogdiana Jizzakh; Surkhon Termez; Turon Yaypan	Andijon-SGS; Aral; Dinamo Samarqand; G'ijduvon; Kokand 1912; Lokomotiv Tashkent; Mash'al Mubarek; Shurtan Guzar; United Redbridge; Xorazm Urganch	Do'stlik Toshkent; Jizzax; Lokomotiv BFK; Olimpiya; Paxtakor-79; Shahrixonchi; Yangiyer; Zaamin

== Format and schedule ==
Round	Clubs remaining	Clubs involved	First match date
First round	38	8	24 March 2023
Second round	34	4	26 March 2023
Group Stage	32	32	2 April 2023
Round of 16	16	16	1 August 2023
Quarter-finals	8	8	
Semi-finals	4	4	
Final	2	2	

=== First round ===
24 March 2023	Chig‘atoy	1 – 4	Nurafshon	Chig'atoy
09:00 (UTC+6)	Otayorov 24'; Andaqulov (yellow card) 62'; Yangiboyev (yellow card) 83'; Yusupov (yellow card) 90'	Report	Umarov 10' (yellow card) 16'; Iskandarov (yellow card) 32'; Ashurov 35'; Muhiddinov 59', 89'	Stadium: Chig'atoy Stadium; Attendance: 37; Referee: Ma'murjon Ilhomov

24 March 2023	Jizzax	2 – 0	Yangiyo'l	Chig'atoy
11:30 (UTC+6)	Qo‘yboqov (yellow card) 25' (yellow-red card) 71'; Yoqubov 35'; Jabborov 57' (yellow card) 90+1'; Bahodirov (yellow card) 84'; Malikov (yellow card) 84'	Report	Xolmurotov (yellow card) 29'; Noraliyev (yellow card) 78'; Qushibov (yellow card) 84'	Stadium: Chig'atoy Stadium; Attendance: 150; Referee: Nikita Mustafin

24 March 2023	Sementchi	0 – 1	Jayxun-2023	Chig'atoy
14:00 (UTC+6)	O'rinbosarov (yellow card) 8'; Abelfazov (yellow card) 33'; Ne’matov (yellow card) 77'; Nurmatov (yellow card) 87'	Report	O'rinbosarov 35' (o.g.)	Stadium: Chig'atoy Stadium; Attendance: 47; Referee: Sardor Ismatullayev

24 March 2023	Olimpiya	3 – 1	Qumqo'rg'on-1977	Chig'atoy
16:30 (UTC+6)	O'rmonjonov (yellow card) 9' (goal) 87'; Mahmudov (yellow card) 32'; Abdullayev 35' (pen.); Karimov (yellow card) 42'; Mansurov 65'; Yeraliyev (yellow card) 77'	Report	Choriyev (yellow card) 10'; Shodmonov (yellow card) 35'; Gazarov (yellow card) 47'; Temirov (yellow card) 51'; Rashidov 52'; Karilov (yellow card) 75'; Nusratov (yellow card) 90+3'	Stadium: Chig'atoy Stadium; Attendance: 150; Referee: Doston Rahmonov

=== Second round ===
26 March 2023	Nurafshon	2 – 5	Jizzax	Chig'atoy
11:00 (UTC+6)	Umarov (yellow card) 17'; Iskandarov (yellow card) 27'; Mo‘inov (yellow card) 29'; Sulaymonov 74', 81' (pen.); Jo'rayev (yellow card) 84'	Report	Jabborov 8', 9'; Ibragimov 19'; Malikov 30'; Saidahmedov 54'; Rashidov (yellow card) 59'	Stadium: Chig'atoy Stadium; Attendance: 47; Referee: Sanjar Nazarov

26 March 2023	Jayxun-2023	1 – 2	Olimpiya	Chig'atoy
14:00 (UTC+6)	Karilov (yellow card) 16' (goal) 31'; Gulmirzayev (yellow card) 88'	Report	Abdullayev 4', 67'; Mirkomilov (yellow card) 13'; O'rmonjonov (yellow card) 55'; Iminjonov (yellow card) 56'; Jumatov (yellow card) 82'; Mahmudov (yellow card) 90+4'	Stadium: Chig'atoy Stadium; Attendance: 72; Referee: Abdurashid Xudoyberganov

== Group stage ==
=== Group A ===
Pos	Team	Pld	W	D	L	GF	GA	GD	Pts	Qualification
1	AGMK (Q)	3	3	0	0	14	2	+12	9	Advanced to Round of 16
2	Andijon-SGS (Q)	3	2	0	1	9	10	−1	6	Advanced to Round of 16
3	Jizzax (E)	3	1	0	2	5	7	−2	3	
4	G'ijduvon (E)	3	0	0	3	3	12	−9	0	

Updated to match(es) played on 1 June 2023. Source: PFL
(E) Eliminated; (Q) Qualified for the phase indicated

2 April 2023 1	Andijon-SGS	3 – 2	Jizzax	Chig'atoy
16:30 (UTC+6)	Abduqahhorov (yellow card) 37'; Zuhriddinov (yellow card) 45'; Mo'minov (yellow card) 61'; Karimov 76', 85' (yellow card) 80'; Jumaboyev 90+2'; Qahhorov (yellow card) 90+4'	Report	Baxtiyorov (yellow card) 21'; Malikov 39'; Jabborov 57'; Ibragimov (yellow card) 62'; Rashidov (yellow card) 75'	Stadium: Chig'atoy Stadium; Attendance: 46; Referee: Farruh Yansupov

4 April 2023 1	G'ijduvon	0 – 5	AGMK	Bukhara
18:20 (UTC+6)	Rahimov (yellow card) 55'; Bahromov (yellow card) 68'	Report	Tursunov 13' (pen.); Sánchez 32', 56' (pen.), 83'; Ismailov 75'	Stadium: Buxoro Arena; Attendance: 155; Referee: Ravshan Abduvohidov

3 May 2023 2	Jizzax	2 – 1	G'ijduvon	Jizzakh
17:15 (UTC+6)	Jabborov 9' (yellow card) 57'; Yoqubov (yellow card) 45' (goal) 78'; Bahodirov (yellow card) 60' (yellow-red card) 60'	Report	Safarboyev (yellow card) 13'; Qosimov (yellow card) 15'; Murodov (yellow card) 45+1'; Boysariyev 90'	Stadium: Futbo'l Maxorat Maktabi; Attendance: 389; Referee: Nikita Mustafin

3 May 2023 2	AGMK	6 – 1	Andijon-SGS	Tashkent
19:00 (UTC+6)	Ergashev (yellow card) 2'; Ahmadaliev (yellow card) 28'; Qosimov 34'; Giyosov 45+1'; Boakye 74', 76'; Gadoyev 90+1'; Rukhadze 90+3'	Report	Nurmuhammadov (yellow card) 54'; Turg'unboyev 85'	Stadium: JAR Stadium; Attendance: 155; Referee: Doston Mirzaraimov

1 June 2023 3	Jizzax	1 – 3	AGMK	Jizzakh
17:45 (UTC+6)	Yoqubov 89'	Report	Mirahmadov 32'; Giyosov 51'; Nazari 80'	Stadium: Futbo'l Maxorat Maktabi; Attendance: 498; Referee: Rustam Lutfullin

1 June 2023 3	Andijon-SGS	5 – 2	G'ijduvon	Kokand
17:45 (UTC+6)	Rejabboyev 9'; Mahamatov 13'; Mo'ydinov 19', 73'; Karimov 75'	Report	Bahromov 37'; Jo'rayev 79'	Stadium: Kokand Markaziy Stadium; Attendance: 83; Referee: Doston Mirzaraimov

=== Group B ===
Pos	Team	Pld	W	D	L	GF	GA	GD	Pts	Qualification
1	Nasaf (Q)	3	3	0	0	3	0	+3	9	Advanced to Round of 16
2	Surkhon Termez (Q)	3	1	1	1	4	1	+3	4	Advanced to Round of 16
3	Mash'al Mubarek (E)	3	1	1	1	3	3	0	4	
4	Kokand 1912 (E)	3	0	0	3	2	8	−6	0	

Updated to match(es) played on 2 June 2023. Source: PFL
(E) Eliminated; (Q) Qualified for the phase indicated

5 April 2023 1	Kokand 1912	0 – 1	Nasaf	Kokand
18:00 (UTC+6)	O‘rinov (yellow card) 52'; Malikjonov (yellow card) 71'; Akbarov (yellow card) 90'	Report	Komilov 5'; Sa’dullayev (yellow card) 42'; Davronov (yellow card) 45+1'; Mateus (yellow card) 68'; Aliqulov (yellow card) 90+3'	Stadium: Central Stadium; Attendance: 1,336; Referee: Ahrol Risqulloyev

5 April 2023 1	Surkhon Termez	0 – 0	Mash'al Mubarek	Tashkent
18:00 (UTC+6)	Jo‘rayev (yellow card) 62'	Report	Normurodov (yellow card) 56'	Stadium: JAR Stadium; Attendance: 287; Referee: Olim To'ychiboyev

2 May 2023 2	Mash'al Mubarek	3 – 2	Kokand 1912	Muborak
17:30 (UTC+6)	G‘ulomov 15', 67' (yellow card) 60'; Muzaffarov (yellow card) 45+1' (yellow-red card) 46'; Petrov 80'; Baratov (yellow card) 90'	Report	Hojimirzayev (yellow card) 1'; Akbarov 35'; Shixov 73'; Mirahmatov (yellow card) 90'	Stadium: Bahrom Vafoev Stadium; Attendance: 1,820; Referee: Ilya Ilyin

3 May 2023 2	Nasaf	1 – 0	Surkhon Termez	Qarshi
19:00 (UTC+6)	Davronov (yellow card) 24'; Amonov 76' (pen.)	Report	Filiposyan (yellow card) 75'	Stadium: Markaziy Stadium; Attendance: 3,210; Referee: Akobir Shukrullayev

2 June 2023 3	Surkhon Termez	4 – 0	Kokand 1912	Tashkent
18:00 (UTC+6)	Jo‘rayev (yellow card) 13'; Abdusalomov 36'; Sokol 40'; Jumayev 85'; Nimely 90'	Report		Stadium: Central Stadium; Attendance: 78; Referee: Vadim Agishev

2 June 2023 3	Mash'al Mubarek	0 – 1	Nasaf	Muborak
18:00 (UTC+6)	Petrov (penalty missed) 5'; Akramov (yellow card) 55'; Sa’dullayev (yellow card) 75'	Report	Gaybullaev (yellow card) 39'; Bozorov 44'; Davronov (yellow card) 64'	Stadium: Bahrom Vafoev Stadium; Attendance: 738; Referee: Ilgiz Tantashev

=== Group C ===
Pos	Team	Pld	W	D	L	GF	GA	GD	Pts	Qualification
1	Bunyodkor (Q)	3	1	2	0	1	0	+1	5	Advanced to Playoff Round
2	Neftchi Fergana (Q)	3	1	1	1	4	2	+2	4	Advanced to Playoff Round
3	Metallurg Bekabad (E)	3	1	1	1	4	4	0	4	
4	United Redbridge (E)	3	0	2	1	2	5	−3	2	

Updated to match(es) played on 1 June 2023. Source: PFL
(E) Eliminated; (Q) Qualified for the phase indicated

12 April 2023 1	Neftchi Fergana	0 – 0	Bunyodkor	Fergana
18:00 (UTC+6)	Batyushyn (yellow card) 26'; Adhamzoda (yellow card) 82'	Report		Stadium: Istiqlol Stadium; Attendance: 5,512; Referee: Ibrohim Ismoilov

12 April 2023 1	Metallurg Bekabad	2 – 2	United Redbridge	Bekabad
18:10 (UTC+6)	Qayumov (yellow card) 20'; Gafurov 44'; Po'latov (yellow card) 74'; Ibragimov 89'; Abdurazzoqov (yellow card) 90+4'	Report	Tursunov (yellow card) 36'; Mamatov 55'; Shamsiddinov 67'; Davronov (yellow card) 78'	Stadium: Metallurg Bekabad Stadium; Attendance: 2,105; Referee: Vadim Agishev

10 May 2023 2	United Redbridge	0 – 3	Neftchi Fergana	Samarkand
19:00 (UTC+6)	Musulmonov (yellow card) 11'; Loqayev (yellow card) 23'; G‘ulomov (yellow card) 69'	Report	Abdullayev 36'; Batyushyn (yellow card) 37' (goal) 57'; Adhamzoda 89'	Stadium: Dinamo Samarkand Stadium; Attendance: 543; Referee: Ilgiz Tantashev

10 May 2023 2	Bunyodkor	1 – 0	Metallurg Bekabad	Tashkent
19:00 (UTC+6)	Qahramonov (yellow card) 21' (yellow-red card) 90+4'; Yo‘ldoshev 41'; Yoqubov (yellow card) 90+1'; Kenjayev (yellow card) 90+1'	Report	Ismoilov (yellow card) 11'; Shodmonov (yellow card) 40'; Palić (yellow card) 68'	Stadium: Milliy Stadium; Attendance: 343; Referee: Asker Najafaliyev

1 June 2023 3	United Redbridge	0 – 0	Bunyodkor	Samarkand
20:00 (UTC+6)		Report	Fozilov (red card) 90+3'	Stadium: Dinamo Samarkand Stadium; Attendance: 503; Referee: Ilya Ilyin

1 June 2023 3	Metallurg Bekabad	2 – 1	Neftchi Fergana	Bekabad
20:00 (UTC+6)	Gafurov 4'; Urinboev 38'	Report	Adhamzoda 90'	Stadium: Metallurg Bekabad Stadium; Attendance: 3,510; Referee: Ahrol Risqulloyev

=== Group D ===
Pos	Team	Pld	W	D	L	GF	GA	GD	Pts	Qualification
1	Turon Yaypan (Q)	3	2	1	0	7	3	+4	7	Advanced to Playoff Round
2	Buxoro (Q)	3	1	2	0	3	2	+1	5	Advanced to Playoff Round
3	Shurtan Guzar (E)	3	1	1	1	6	7	−1	4	
4	Yangiyer (E)	3	0	0	3	1	5	−4	0	

Updated to match(es) played on 3 June 2023. Source: PFL
(E) Eliminated; (Q) Qualified for the phase indicated

11 April 2023 1	Shurtan Guzar	3 – 1	Yangiyer	Gʻuzor
17:15 (UTC+6)	Umarov (yellow card) 24'; Qobulov 28', 84' (yellow card) 30'; Sarimsoqov (yellow card) 62'; Polvonov 72'	Report	Rasulov 7'; Tursunqulov (yellow card) 83'	Stadium: G'uzor Stadium; Attendance: 586; Referee: Nikita Mustafin

12 April 2023 1	Buxoro	1 – 1	Turon Yaypan	Bukhara
18:30 (UTC+6)	Jo‘raboyev 29'; Nihaev (yellow card) 74'; Muhammadiyev (yellow card) 83'; Ro'ziyev (yellow card) 90+3'	Report	Chichinadze (yellow card) 41'; Ibragimov (yellow card) 45+1'; Aliyev (yellow card) 87'; Bojović 90+4'; Muxtorov (yellow card) 90+5'	Stadium: Buxoro Arena; Attendance: 1,240; Referee: To'rabek Suyunov

9 May 2023 2	Yangiyer	0 – 1	Buxoro	Yangiyer
17:00 (UTC+6)	Omonov (yellow card) 21'; Yunusov (yellow card) 36'	Report	Kasyan 18'; Otakhonov (yellow card) 68'; Kamolov (yellow card) 90+1'	Stadium: Yangiyer Stadium; Attendance: 725; Referee: Vadim Agishev

9 May 2023 2	Turon Yaypan	5 – 2	Shurtan Guzar	Yaypan
17:00 (UTC+6)	Kumburović 6'; Toshmirzayev 17'; Bojović 26'; Ro‘ziyev 34'; Stoiljković 90+4'	Report	Tursunqulov 45+2'; Nuriddinov 55'; Suvonov (yellow card) 84'; Safarov (yellow card) 90+3'	Stadium: Uzbekistan Stadium; Attendance: 1,210; Referee: G'ayrat Jo'rayev

3 June 2023 3	Buxoro	1 – 1	Shurtan Guzar	Bukhara
20:00 (UTC+6)	Ro'ziyev (yellow card) 8'; Stanisavljević (yellow card) 30'; Jo‘rayev 55' (pen.)	Report	Qobulov (yellow card) 57' (yellow-red card) 86'; Imomov 76'; Suvonov (yellow card) 84'; Safarov (yellow card) 86'	Stadium: Buxoro Arena; Attendance: 2,473; Referee: Rahimbek Karimov

3 June 2023 3	Turon Yaypan	1 – 0	Yangiyer	Yaypan
20:00 (UTC+6)	Enyang (yellow card) 57'; Kumburović (yellow card) 71'; Beglarishvili 75'; Muxtorov (yellow card) 81'; Ahmedov (yellow card) 89'	Dilshod Jo‘rayev	Tolibjonov (yellow card) 57'; Xoldorov (yellow card) 60'	Stadium: Uzbekistan Stadium; Attendance: 788; Referee: Lochin Dolimov

=== Group E ===
Pos	Team	Pld	W	D	L	GF	GA	GD	Pts	Qualification
1	Dinamo Samarqand (Q)	3	3	0	0	7	1	+6	9	Advanced to Playoff Round
2	Lokomotiv Tashkent (Q)	3	2	0	1	7	3	+4	6	Advanced to Playoff Round
3	Qizilqum Zarafshon (E)	3	1	0	2	3	3	0	3	
4	Zaamin (E)	3	0	0	3	0	10	−10	0	

Updated to match(es) played on 4 June 2023. Source: PFL
(E) Eliminated; (Q) Qualified for the phase indicated

18 April 2023 1	Lokomotiv Tashkent	4 – 0	Zaamin	Tashkent
18:10 (UTC+6)	Solovyov 21'; Najdenov (yellow card) 37'; Soirov 47', 53'; Bikmaev 69'	Report	Umarov (yellow card) 40'; Suyunov (yellow card) 67'; Matfozilov (yellow card) 87'	Stadium: Lokomotiv Stadium; Attendance: 72; Referee: Jaloliddin Xusnitdinov

18 April 2023 1	Dinamo Samarqand	1 – 0	Qizilqum Zarafshon	Samarkand
18:20 (UTC+6)	Grigalashvili (yellow card) 36'; Sharafutdinov 48'; Mustafoyev (yellow card) 76'; Boydullayev (yellow card) 81'; Yagudin (yellow card) 90+1'	Report	Rahmatov (yellow card) 84'	Stadium: Dinamo Stadium; Attendance: 1,031; Referee: Aziz Asimov

16 May 2023 2	Zaamin	0 – 3	Dinamo Samarqand	Zomin
17:30 (UTC+6)		Report	Koike (yellow card) 37' (goal) 78'; Narh 54'; Ubaydullaev (yellow card) 56'; Malikov (yellow card) 69'; Nasimov 89'	Stadium: City Stadium; Attendance: 667; Referee: Nayim Qosimov

16 May 2023 2	Qizilqum Zarafshon	0 – 2	Lokomotiv Tashkent	Navoiy
20:00 (UTC+6)	Abdualimov (red card) 11'; Nurmatov (yellow card) 83'	Report	Jumaev 41'; Opeh (yellow card) 46'; Soirov 66'; Jumaboev (red card) 72'; Najdenov (yellow card) 80'	Stadium: Yoshlar Stadium; Attendance: 517; Referee: Rustam Lutfullin

4 June 2023 3	Qizilqum Zarafshon	3 – 0	Zaamin	Navoiy
20:00 (UTC+6)		Report		Stadium: Yoshlar Stadium; Referee: Davronbek Akmalov
Note: Match awarded 3-0 to Qizilqum Zarafshon.

4 June 2023 3	Dinamo Samarqand	3 – 1	Lokomotiv Tashkent	Samarkand
20:00 (UTC+6)	Narh 14', 69'; Koike (yellow card) 59'; Kojo 90'	Report	Alijonov (yellow card) 44'; Najdenov (yellow card) 74'; Soirov (yellow card) 86'; Abdurahmonov 90+2'	Stadium: Dinamo Stadium; Attendance: 1,360; Referee: Sultonmurod Abdurahmonov

=== Group F ===
Pos	Team	Pld	W	D	L	GF	GA	GD	Pts	Qualification
1	Olympic Tashkent (Q)	3	2	1	0	5	1	+4	7	Advanced to Playoff Round
2	Navbahor Namangan (Q)	3	2	0	1	6	3	+3	6	Advanced to Playoff Round
3	Andijon (E)	3	1	1	1	6	1	+5	4	
4	Olimpiya (E)	3	0	0	3	1	13	−12	0	

Updated to match(es) played on 2 June 2023. Source: PFL
(E) Eliminated; (Q) Qualified for the phase indicated

19 April 2023 1	Olimpiya	1 – 4	Navbahor Namangan	Tashkent
16:45 (UTC+6)	Iminjonov 78'	Report	Norxonov 32' (pen.); Abdukholiqov 56'; Urunov 81', 90+3'; Jo‘rabekov (yellow card) 89'	Stadium: ROPSTTM; Attendance: 1,403; Referee: Akmal Rahimov

20 April 2023 1	Andijon	0 – 0	Olympic Tashkent	Fergana
18:00 (UTC+6)	Abdunabiyev (yellow card) 38'; Lytovka (yellow card) 62'; Toirov (yellow card) 69'	Report	Ibrohimov (yellow card) 16'	Stadium: Istiqlol Stadium; Attendance: 142; Referee: Doston Mirzaraimov

17 May 2023 2	Olympic Tashkent	3 – 0	Olimpiya	Tashkent
19:30 (UTC+6)	G'iyosov 22', 86'; Abdumannopov (yellow card) 35'; Mirkomilov 45' (o.g.)	Report	Mahmudov (yellow card) 88'	Stadium: JAR Stadium; Attendance: 426; Referee: Shavkat Nasibullayev

18 May 2023 2	Navbahor Namangan	1 – 0	Andijon	Namangan
19:30 (UTC+6)	Đokić (yellow card) 25'; Jo‘rabekov (yellow card) 30'; Yo‘ldoshev 65' (yellow card) 68'	Report	G‘ulomov (yellow card) 37'; Komilov (yellow card) 47'; Abdunabiyev (yellow card) 61'; Komilov (yellow card) 62'	Stadium: Markaziy Stadium; Attendance: 8,069; Referee: Ravshan Abduvohidov

2 June 2023 3	Andijon	6 – 0	Olimpiya	Fergana
20:00 (UTC+6)	Farhodov 3'; Hebaj 35', 50'; Sohibjonov 68'; Mamatkazin (yellow card) 69'; Berdiyev 75'; Azimov 82'	Report	Hikmatullayev (yellow card) 49'	Stadium: Istiqlol Stadium; Attendance: 419; Referee: G'ayrat Jo'rayev

2 June 2023 3	Olympic Tashkent	2 – 1	Navbahor Namangan	Tashkent
20:00 (UTC+6)	Abdumajidov (yellow card) 43'; Jiyanov 62'; Jo‘raqo‘ziyev 78'; Bo'riyev (yellow card) 85'; Abdunabiyev (yellow card) 90+4'	Report	Yo‘ldoshev (yellow card) 10'; Sobirjonov 46'	Stadium: JAR Stadium; Attendance: 1,010; Referee: Shavkat Nasibullayev

=== Group G ===
Pos	Team	Pld	W	D	L	GF	GA	GD	Pts	Qualification
1	Aral (Q)	3	2	1	0	8	3	+5	7	Advanced to Playoff Round
2	Pakhtakor Tashkent (Q)	3	2	0	1	6	2	+4	6	Advanced to Playoff Round
3	Sogdiana Jizzakh (E)	3	1	1	1	7	3	+4	4	
4	Do'stlik Toshkent (E)	3	0	0	3	1	14	−13	0	

Updated to match(es) played on 3 June 2023. Source: PFL
(E) Eliminated; (Q) Qualified for the phase indicated

26 April 2023 1	Aral	4 – 1	Do'stlik Toshkent	Nukus
17:30 (UTC+6)	Nizanov 28'; Kuanishbayev 32'; Turopov 39'; Usmonov 63'; Norqobilov (yellow card) 90+1'	Report	Asatillayev 75'	Stadium: Turon Stadium; Attendance: 1,021; Referee: Shuhrat Rajabov

26 April 2023 1	Pakhtakor Tashkent	1 – 0	Sogdiana Jizzakh	Tashkent
18:30 (UTC+6)	Khamdamov (yellow card) 43'; Hamrobekov (yellow card) 63'; Ćeran 87'	Report	Andreev (yellow card) 40'; Qakhramanov (yellow card) 76'	Stadium: Central Stadium; Attendance: 1,078; Referee: Abdurashid Xudoyberganov

24 May 2023 2	Do'stlik Toshkent	0 – 5	Pakhtakor Tashkent	Tashkent
20:00 (UTC+6)	Obidjonov (yellow card) 28'	Report	Hamrobekov (penalty missed) 6'; Sayfiev (penalty missed) 33'; Khamdamov 35', 52'; Turgunboev 37'; O'rinboyev 61' (o.g.); Todorov 75'	Stadium: Central Stadium; Attendance: 320; Referee: Doston Rahmonov

24 May 2023 2	Sogdiana Jizzakh	2 – 2	Aral	Jizzakh
20:00 (UTC+6)	Kolaković 65'; Zajmović 79'; Orifov (yellow card) 90+3'	Report	Qalmag'anbetov 33'; Norqobilov (yellow card) 36'; Umirbekov 69'; Qutiboyev (yellow card) 90+5'; Nasimov (yellow card) 90+6'	Stadium: Sogdiana Stadium; Attendance: 827; Referee: Farruh Yansupov

3 June 2023 3	Do'stlik Toshkent	0 – 5	Sogdiana Jizzakh	Tashkent
18:00 (UTC+6)		Report	Qahramonov 35', 75'; Serderov 39'; Yo‘ldoshev (yellow card) 42'; Kolaković 51'; Shoahmedov 59'	Stadium: Central Stadium; Attendance: 109; Referee: Temur To‘xtasinov

3 June 2023 3	Aral	2 – 0	Pakhtakor Tashkent	Nukus
18:00 (UTC+6)	Kuanishbayev 20'; Qutibayev (yellow card) 31'; Ahmadjonov (yellow card) 49'; Yusupbayev (yellow card) 75'; Turopov (yellow card) 76'; Yusupbayev 90+3'	Report	Turgunboev (yellow card) 12'; Abdumajidov (red card) 28'; Sabirkhodjaev (yellow card) 50'	Stadium: Turon Stadium; Attendance: 2,115; Referee: Firdavs Norsafarov

=== Group H ===
Pos	Team	Pld	W	D	L	GF	GA	GD	Pts	Qualification
1	Xorazm Urganch (Q)	3	3	0	0	6	2	+4	9	Advanced to Playoff Round
2	Paxtakor-79 (Q)	3	1	1	1	5	5	0	4	Advanced to Playoff Round
3	Lokomotiv BFK (E)	3	0	2	1	4	5	−1	2	
4	Shahrixonchi (E)	3	0	1	2	4	7	−3	1	

Updated to match(es) played on 4 June 2023. Source: PFL
(E) Eliminated; (Q) Qualified for the phase indicated

25 April 2023 1	Paxtakor-79	2 – 1	Shahrixonchi	Navoiy
17:00 (UTC+6)	Adashboyev (yellow card) 40'; Usmonov 45+3' (pen.) (red card) 73'; Najimov 55' (o.g.); Matyoqubov (yellow card) 73'	Report	Samikov (yellow card) 6'; G'ulomjonov 35'; G'ulomjonov (yellow card) 61'; Isroilov (yellow card) 73' (yellow-red card); Abdurahmonov (yellow card) 73'	Stadium: Kimyogar Stadium; Attendance: 4,710; Referee: Rustam Choriyev

25 April 2023 1	Xorazm Urganch	1 – 0	Lokomotiv BFK	Khwarazm
18:00 (UTC+6)	Bahromov (yellow card) 17'; Beshimov 29'; Niyozmetov (yellow card) 90+4'	Report	Abduxoliqov (yellow card) 38'	Stadium: Khorezm Stadium; Attendance: 1,154; Referee: Doston Rahmonov

23 May 2023 2	Lokomotiv BFK	1 – 1	Paxtakor-79	Tashkent
17:30 (UTC+6)	Abduxoliqov 45'; Yo'ldoshev (yellow card) 75'; Islomov (yellow card) 87'	Report	Soliev 32'; Rahimov (yellow card) 45+3'; Abdusalomov (penalty missed) 76'	Stadium: TFA Stadium; Attendance: 99; Referee: Jaloliddin Xusnitdinov

23 May 2023 2	Xorazm Urganch	2 – 0	Shahrixonchi	Urgench
18:30 (UTC+6)	Sharipov 23'; Ahmadov (yellow card) 40'; Bahromov 44'	Report	Najimov (yellow card) 62'	Stadium: Xorazm Stadium; Attendance: 426; Referee: Yerlan Nurjanov

4 June 2023 3	Shahrixonchi	3 – 3	Lokomotiv BFK	Kokand
17:30 (UTC+6)	Nuriddinov 24'; Abdurahmonov (yellow card) 38'; Najimov (yellow card) 45' (goal) 53'; O'ktamov 75'	Report	Halilov 3', 45+1' (pen.); Aliyev 51' (pen.); Abduxoliqov (yellow card) 63'; Mansurjonov (yellow card) 82'	Stadium: Central Stadium; Attendance: 112; Referee: Shohruh Qayumov

4 June 2023 3	Paxtakor-79	2 – 3	Xorazm Urganch	Navoiy
17:30 (UTC+6)	Qahhorov 39'; Xoldorov 63'; Usmonov (yellow card) 73'	Report	Meliyev 51'; Mbanwei 54', 80'; Shodmonov (yellow card) 90+1'; Jumayev (yellow card) 90+5'	Stadium: Kimyogar Stadium; Attendance: 3,100; Referee: To'rabek Suyunov

== Knockout stage ==
=== Round of 16 ===
1 August 2023	Nasaf	4 – 3	Buxoro	Qarshi
20:00 (UTC+6)	G‘aybullayev (yellow card) 9'; Eshmurodov (yellow card) 27'; Davronov 45+6'; Chávez 57'; Lima 67'; Amonov 90+5'	Report	Stanisavljević 10' (pen.); Po'latov (yellow card) 49'; Ibrohimov 52'; Jo‘rayev (yellow card) 54'; Kukić (yellow card) 63'; Norxonov (yellow card) 77' (goal) 84' (pen.)	Stadium: Markaziy Stadium; Attendance: 2,257; Referee: Akmal Rahimov

1 August 2023	Dinamo Samarqand	3 – 2	Pakhtakor Tashkent	Samarkand
20:00 (UTC+6)	Narh 5' (yellow card) 37'; Mo'ydinov 13'; Suleymanov (yellow card) 23'; Kojo 27'; Ubaydullayev (yellow card) 73'; Mensah (yellow card) 78'	Report	Tursunov (yellow card) 26'; Banaszak (yellow card) 31'; Hamrobekov (yellow card) 44'; Ćeran 60', 82'; Turgunboev (yellow card) 63'	Stadium: Dinamo Samarkand Stadium; Attendance: 5,023; Referee: Komil Rasulov

1 August 2023	Turon Yaypan	3 – 0	Paxtakor-79	Yaypan
20:00 (UTC+6)	Enyang 40'; Aysarov (yellow card) 55'; Komilov 68'; Murtozayev 78' (pen.)	Report	Ahmadaliyev (yellow card) 46'; To'xtasinov (yellow card) 54'; Adashboyev (yellow card) 87'	Stadium: Uzbekistan Stadium; Attendance: 512; Referee: Ibrohim Ismoilov

2 August 2023	AGMK	2 – 1	Lokomotiv Tashkent	Tashkent
20:00 (UTC+6)	Boakye 26', 34'; Rahmonov (yellow card) 30'	Report	Soirov (penalty missed) 31'; Jumaboev (yellow card) 41'; Toshpulatov 76'	Stadium: Central Stadium; Attendance: 187; Referee: Temur To‘xtasinov

2 August 2023	Olympic Tashkent	10 – 0	Andijon-SGS	Tashkent
20:00 (UTC+6)	Jaloliddinov 6', 43', 44', 90' (pen.); Abdumajidov 11'; Odilov 28', 36', 78'; Ahrorov (yellow card) 41'; Akromov 45'; Jo'raboyev 80'	Report		Stadium: JAR Stadium; Attendance: 636; Referee: Abdurashid Xudoyberganov

8 August 2023	Xorazm Urganch	3 – 1	Metallurg Bekabad	Urgench
19:00 (UTC+6)	Mbanwei 20'; Bahromov (yellow card) 35'; Ismoilov 49' (pen.); Jumayev 88'	Report	Xusinov 2' (o.g.); Palić (yellow card) 48'; Aliqulov (yellow card) 88'	Stadium: Xorazm Stadium; Attendance: 1,515; Referee: Ravshan Abduvohidov

14 August 2023	Aral	0 – 2	Navbahor Namangan	Nukus
17:30 (UTC+6)	Sagdullayev (yellow card) 32'; Qutiboyev (yellow card) 74'; Ahmadjonov (yellow card) 79'; Nizanov (yellow card) 80'; Umirbekov (yellow card) 85'	Report	Yo‘ldoshev (yellow card) 20'; Golban (yellow card) 24'; Jo‘rabekov (yellow card) 35'; Abdumannopov 58'; Tabatadze 72'	Stadium: Turon Stadium; Attendance: 2,136; Referee: Rustam Choriyev

16 August 2023	Bunyodkor	2 – 3 (a.e.t.)	Surkhon Termez	Tashkent
19:00 (UTC+6)	Nosko 6' (pen.), 57'; Ergashev (yellow card) 89'; Izzatov (yellow card) 94'; Abdurahmonov (yellow card) FT	Report	Abdusalomov 18', 25' (pen.); Shamsiyev (yellow card) 87'; Karimov 96'	Stadium: Milliy Stadium; Attendance: 1,681; Referee: Sardor Ismatullayev

=== Quarterfinals ===
31 August 2023	Dinamo Samarqand	4 – 3	Olympic Tashkent	Samarkand
19:00 (UTC+6)	Mensah (yellow card) 35'; Mijić (yellow card) 37'; Kojo 43', 101'; Mo'ydinov 80'; Asadullayev 107'; Yagudin (yellow card) 120+1'	Report	Mirsaidov 16'; Begimov (yellow card) 42'; Odilov 49', 113'; Bo'riyev (yellow card) 66'; Jaloliddinov (yellow card) 73'	Stadium: Dinamo Samarkand Stadium; Attendance: 5,503; Referee: G'ayrat Jo'rayev

2 September 2023	Turon Yaypan	1 – 2	Nasaf	Yaypan
18:30 (UTC+6)	Azimov 17'; Abdurashidov (yellow card) 45+1'	Report	Nurulloyev (yellow card) 8'; Bozorov 76'; G‘aybullayev 90+3'	Stadium: Uzbekistan Stadium; Attendance: 1,695; Referee: Ahrol Risqulloyev

3 September 2023	AGMK	4 – 2	Xorazm Urganch	Tashkent
18:00 (UTC+6)	Haqnazari 13', 33'; Mirahmadov 39'; Sánchez 88'; Rustamov (yellow card) 90+3'	Report	Mbanwei 85', 90+1'; Nurmetov (yellow card) 87'	Stadium: Central Stadium; Attendance: 1,903; Referee: Olim To'ychiboyev

3 September 2023	Navbahor Namangan	2 – 0	Surkhon Termez	Namangan
18:00 (UTC+6)	Hoshimov (yellow card) 42'; Tabatadze 68' (pen.), 90+7'	Report	Hamidjonov (yellow card) 32'	Stadium: Markaziy Stadium; Attendance: 10,541; Referee: Firdavs Norsafarov

=== Semifinals ===
19 October 2023	Nasaf	2–1	Dinamo Samarqand	Qarshi
18:00 (UTC+6)				Stadium: Markaziy Stadium; Attendance: 8,300

19 October 2023	AGMK	2–2 (4–3 p)	Navbahor Namangan	Olmaliq
18:00 (UTC+6)				Stadium: AGMK Stadium; Attendance: 4,215

=== Final ===
12 November 2023	Nasaf	1 – 0	AGMK	Qarshi
17:00 (UTC+6)				Stadium: Markaziy Stadium

== Goal scorers ==
As of match played 3 September 2023

5 goals:

- (Uzbekistan) Murodxo‘ja Jabborov - Jizzax
- (Uzbekistan) Alisher Odilov - Olympic Tashkent
- (Cameroon) Tengeg Neville Mbanwei - Xorazm Urganch

4 goals:

- (Italy) Martin Boakye - AGMK
- (Spain) Rubén Sánchez - AGMK
- (Uzbekistan) Abubakir Mo'ydinov - Andijon-SGS / Dinamo Samarqand
- (Ghana) Francis Narh - Dinamo Samarqand
- (Kyrgyzstan) Joel Kojo - Dinamo Samarqand
- (Uzbekistan) Jasurbek Jaloliddinov - Olympic Tashkent

3 goals:

- (Uzbekistan) Hamidullo Karimov - Andijon-SGS
- (Uzbekistan) Sohibjon Yoqubov - Jizzax
- (Tajikistan) Rustam Soirov - Lokomotiv Tashkent
- (Uzbekistan) Abdurahmon Abdullayev - Olimpiya
- (Serbia) Dragan Ćeran - Pakhtakor Tashkent
- (Uzbekistan) Jahongir Abdusalomov - Surkhon Termez

2 goals:

- (Uzbekistan) Khursid Giyosov - AGMK
- (Uzbekistan) Siyavash Haqnazari - AGMK
- (Uzbekistan) Mirjahon Mirahmadov - AGMK
- (Albania) Rubin Hebaj - Andijon
- (Uzbekistan) Zulpuqar Kuanishbayev - Aral
- (Belarus) Aleksey Nosko - Bunyodkor
- (Uzbekistan) Azizbek Malikov - Jizzax
- (Uzbekistan) Azamat Halilov - Lokomotiv BFK
- (Uzbekistan) Saidmahmud G‘ulomov - Mash'al Mubarek
- (Uzbekistan) Husniddin G‘ofurov - Metallurg Bekabad
- (Georgia (country)) Toma Tabatadze - Navbahor Namangan
- (Uzbekistan) Shohruz Norxonov - Navbahor Namangan / Buxoro
- (Uzbekistan) Oston Urunov - Navbahor Namangan
- (Uzbekistan) Azizbek Amonov - Nasaf
- (Uzbekistan) Oybek Bozorov - Nasaf
- (Uzbekistan) Shohmalik Komilov - Nasaf / Turon Yaypan
- (Uzbekistan) Umar Adhamzoda - Neftchi Fergana
- (Uzbekistan) Mirfayz Muhiddinov - Nurafshon
- (Uzbekistan) Sardor Sulaymonov - Nurafshon
- (Uzbekistan) Muhammadali G'iyosov - Olympic Tashkent
- (Uzbekistan) Dostonbek Khamdamov - Pakhtakor Tashkent
- (Uzbekistan) Jamshid Qobulov - Shurtan Guzar
- (Serbia) Marko Kolaković - Sogdiana Jizzakh
- (Uzbekistan) Javohir Qahramonov - Sogdiana Jizzakh
- (Serbia) Milan Bojović - Turon Yaypan

1 goals:

- (Georgia (country)) Irakli Rukhadze - AGMK
- (Iran) Siavash Hagh Nazari - AGMK
- (Uzbekistan) Shohrux Gadoyev - AGMK
- (Uzbekistan) Anzur Ismailov - AGMK
- (Uzbekistan) Mirjalol Qosimov - AGMK
- (Uzbekistan) Sanzhar Tursunov - AGMK
- (Uzbekistan) Sardor Azimov - Andijon
- (Uzbekistan) Suhrob Berdiyev - Andijon
- (Uzbekistan) Bobur Farhodov - Andijon
- (Uzbekistan) Farhod Sohibjonov - Andijon
- (Uzbekistan) Shahboz Jumaboyev - Andijon-SGS
- (Uzbekistan) Abdushukur Mahamatov - Andijon-SGS
- (Uzbekistan) Abubakir Rejabboyev - Andijon-SGS
- (Uzbekistan) Abdulhamid Turg'unboyev - Andijon-SGS
- (Uzbekistan) Damir Nizanov - Aral
- (Uzbekistan) Ruslan Qalmag'anbetov - Aral
- (Uzbekistan) Shahzod Turopov - Aral
- (Uzbekistan) Azizbek Umirbekov - Aral
- (Uzbekistan) Timur Usmonov - Aral
- (Uzbekistan) Arislan Yusupbayev - Aral
- (Uzbekistan) Rasul Yo‘ldoshev - Bunyodkor
- (Serbia) Aleksandar Stanisavljević - Buxoro
- (Ukraine) Oleksandr Kasyan - Buxoro
- (Uzbekistan) Farrux Ibrohimov - Buxoro
- (Uzbekistan) Obid Jo‘raboyev - Buxoro
- (Uzbekistan) Dilshod Jo‘rayev - Buxoro
- (Uzbekistan) Naimjon Otayorov - Chig‘atoy
- (Japan) Yudai Koike - Dinamo Samarqand
- (Uzbekistan) Bahodir Nasimov - Dinamo Samarqand
- (Uzbekistan) Muhammadbobur Asadullayev - Dinamo Samarqand
- (Uzbekistan) Komil Sharafutdinov - Dinamo Samarqand
- (Uzbekistan) Sardor Asatillayev - Do'stlik Toshkent
- (Uzbekistan) Akrom Bahromov - G'ijduvon
- (Uzbekistan) Islom Boysariyev - G'ijduvon
- (Uzbekistan) Farrux Jo'rayev - G'ijduvon
- (Uzbekistan) Umidjon Karilov - Jayxun-2023
- (Uzbekistan) Nodirbek Ibragimov - Jizzax
- (Uzbekistan) Muhammad Saidahmedov - Jizzax
- (Uzbekistan) Bobirjon Akbarov - Kokand 1912
- (Uzbekistan) San’at Shixov - Kokand 1912
- (Uzbekistan) Abrorjon Aliyev - Lokomotiv BFK
- (Uzbekistan) Orifxo'ja Abduxoliqov - Lokomotiv BFK
- (Russia) Ivan Solovyov - Lokomotiv Tashkent
- (Uzbekistan) Ali Abdurahmonov - Lokomotiv Tashkent
- (Uzbekistan) Marat Bikmaev - Lokomotiv Tashkent
- (Uzbekistan) Maruf Jumaev - Lokomotiv Tashkent
- (Uzbekistan) Nurmukhammad Toshpulatov - Lokomotiv Tashkent
- (Ukraine) Serhiy Petrov - Mash'al Mubarek
- (Uzbekistan) Ibrohim Ibragimov - Metallurg Bekabad
- (Uzbekistan) Zabixillo O‘rinboyev - Metallurg Bekabad
- (Argentina) Andrés Chávez - Nasaf
- (Brazil) Mateus Lima - Nasaf
- (Uzbekistan) Alibek Davronov - Nasaf
- (Uzbekistan) G‘olib G‘aybullayev - Nasaf
- (Uzbekistan) Temurkhuja Abdukholiqov - Navbahor Namangan
- (Uzbekistan) Doniyor Abdumannopov - Navbahor Namangan
- (Uzbekistan) Ibrohim Yo‘ldoshev - Navbahor Namangan
- (Uzbekistan) Asad Sobirjonov - Navbahor Namangan
- (Ukraine) Yuriy Batyushyn - Neftchi Fergana
- (Uzbekistan) Izzatilla Abdullayev - Neftchi Fergana
- (Uzbekistan) To‘lqinjon Umarov - Nurafshon
- (Uzbekistan) Saidjon Ashurov - Nurafshon
- (Uzbekistan) Navro'zbek Iminjonov - Olimpiya
- (Uzbekistan) Muhammad Mansurov - Olimpiya
- (Uzbekistan) Oybek O'rmonjonov - Olimpiya
- (Uzbekistan) Odil Abdumajidov - Olympic Tashkent
- (Uzbekistan) Shahzod Akromov - Olympic Tashkent
- (Uzbekistan) Ruslanbek Jiyanov - Olympic Tashkent
- (Uzbekistan) Asad Jo'raboyev - Olympic Tashkent
- (Uzbekistan) Otabek Jo‘raqo‘ziyev - Olympic Tashkent
- (Uzbekistan) Saidazamat Mirsaidov - Olympic Tashkent
- (Uzbekistan) Hasanboy Qahhorov - Paxtakor-79
- (Uzbekistan) Sarvar Soliev - Paxtakor-79
- (Uzbekistan) Elyor Usmonov - Paxtakor-79
- (Uzbekistan) Akbarali Xoldorov - Paxtakor-79
- (Uzbekistan) Kirill Todorov - Pakhtakor Tashkent
- (Uzbekistan) Azizbek Turgunboev - Pakhtakor Tashkent
- (Uzbekistan) Dilshod Rashidov - Qumqo'rg'on-1977
- (Uzbekistan) Saidibrohim G'ulomjonov - Shahrixonchi
- (Uzbekistan) Zokirjon Najimov - Shahrixonchi
- (Uzbekistan) Nuriddin Nuriddinov - Shahrixonchi
- (Uzbekistan) Rahmatullo O'ktamov - Shahrixonchi
- (Uzbekistan) Farhod Imomov - Shurtan Guzar
- (Uzbekistan) Shahboz Nuriddinov - Shurtan Guzar
- (Uzbekistan) Zafar Polvonov - Shurtan Guzar
- (Uzbekistan) Choriyor Tursunqulov - Shurtan Guzar
- (Belgium) Dženan Zajmović - Sogdiana Jizzakh
- (Russia) Serder Serderov - Sogdiana Jizzakh
- (Uzbekistan) Sanjar Shoahmedov - Sogdiana Jizzakh
- (Belarus) Artyom Sokol - Surkhon Termez
- (Liberia) Sylvanus Nimely - Surkhon Termez
- (Uzbekistan) Asilbek Jumayev - Surkhon Termez
- (Uzbekistan) Asadbek Karimov - Surkhon Termez
- (Cameroon) Ngu Abega Enyang- Turon Yaypan
- (Georgia (country)) Zakaria Beglarishvili - Turon Yaypan
- (Montenegro) Nikola Kumburović - Turon Yaypan
- (Serbia) Dušan Stoiljković - Turon Yaypan
- (Uzbekistan) Rustamxon Azimov - Turon Yaypan
- (Uzbekistan) Humoyun Murtozayev - Turon Yaypan
- (Uzbekistan) Quvondiq Ro‘ziyev - Turon Yaypan
- (Uzbekistan) Bilolxon Toshmirzayev - Turon Yaypan
- (Uzbekistan) Asomiddin Mamatov - United Redbridge
- (Uzbekistan) Murodjon Shamsiddinov - United Redbridge
- (Uzbekistan) Azizbek Bahromov - Xorazm Urganch
- (Uzbekistan) Shahzod Beshimov - Xorazm Urganch
- (Uzbekistan) Temurbek Ismoilov - Xorazm Urganch
- (Uzbekistan) Jasur Jumayev - Xorazm Urganch
- (Uzbekistan) Siroj Meliyev - Xorazm Urganch
- (Uzbekistan) Ulug'bek Sharipov - Xorazm Urganch
- (Uzbekistan) Muhriddin Rasulov - Yangiyer

Own goal

- (Uzbekistan) Faxriyor O'rinbosarov - Sementchi vs Jayxun-2023 24 March 2023
- (Uzbekistan) Zokirjon Najimov - Shahrixonchi vs Paxtakor-79 25 April 2023
- (Uzbekistan) Abdulloh Mirkomilov - Olimpiya vs Olympic Tashkent 17 May 2023
- (Uzbekistan) Asror O'rinboyev - Do'stlik Toshkent vs Pakhtakor Tashkent 24 May 2023
- (Uzbekistan) Abror Xusinov - Xorazm Urganch vs Metallurg Bekabad 8 August 2023

Awarded games

- Qizilqum Zarafshon vs Zaamin 4 June 2023
