= Valeri Sheremetov =

Russian football player and coach

Personal information
- Full name: Valeri Nikolayevich Sheremetov
- Date of birth: 15 May 1964 (age 62)
- Place of birth: Otradny, Samara Oblast, Russian SFSR, Soviet Union
- Height: 1.80 m (5 ft 11 in)
- Position: Goalkeeper

Team information
- Current team: Ufa (GK coach)

Youth career
- –1981: FC Neftyanik Otradny

Senior career*
Years	Team	Apps	(Gls)
1981–1985	Rotor Volgograd		
1985–1986	Zvezda Gorodishche		
1988–1991	Tekstilshchik Kamyshin	96	(0)
1992	Neftchi Fergana	7	(0)
1992	Metallurg Volzhsky	7	(0)
1993	Lada-Tolyatti	20	(0)
1994–1995	Zvezda Gorodishche	49	(0)
1997	Energetik Uren	8	(0)
1997–1998	Lada-Togliatti-VAZ Togliatti	3	(0)
1999	Neftyanik Pokhvistnevo	5	(0)
1999	Reformatsiya Abakan	3	(0)
Total		198+	(0)

Managerial career
- 1995–1996: Torpedo Volzhsky (assistant)
- 1998: Lada-Togliatti-VAZ Togliatti (assistant)
- 1999: Baltika Kaliningrad (assistant)
- 2000: Balakovo (assistant)
- 2000: Metallurg Lipetsk (assistant)
- 2001–2002: Uralan (assistant)
- 2003–2004: Torpedo-Metallurg Moscow (GK coach)
- 2004: Luch Vladivostok (GK coach)
- 2005–2007: Moscow (GK coach)
- 2008–2009: Krylia Sovetov Samara (GK coach)
- 2010: CSKA Moscow Academy (GK coach)
- 2011: Lokomotiv Moscow (GK coach)
- 2011–2012: Rostov (GK coach)
- 2013–2015: Torpedo Moscow (GK coach)
- 2016: Kairat (GK coach)
- 2016–2017: Khimki (GK coach)
- 2017–2018: Anzhi Makhachkala (GK coach)
- 2018–2020: Torpedo Moscow (GK coach)
- 2020: Irtysh Pavlodar (GK coach)
- 2021–2022: Torpedo Moscow (GK coach)
- 2023: Sakhalinets Moscow (GK coach)
- 2023–2024: Chelyabinsk (GK coach)
- 2025–: Ufa (GK coach)
- * Club domestic league appearances and goals

Valeri Nikolayevich Sheremetov (Russian: Валерий Николаевич Шереметов; born 15 May 1964) is a Russian professional football coach and former goalkeeper. He is the goalkeepers coach with Ufa.

== Career ==
In 2021, Sheremetov returned to FC Torpedo Moscow as their goalkeeper coach under Aleksandr Borodyuk.
