= Dušan Stoiljković =

Serbian footballer

Personal information
- Date of birth: 5 September 1994 (age 32)
- Place of birth: Sombor, FR Yugoslavia
- Height: 1.82 m (6 ft 0 in)
- Position: Winger

Youth career
- Polet Karavukovo
- 2010–2011: Vojvodina
- 2012: Novi Sad

Senior career*
Years	Team	Apps	(Gls)
2012–2013	Novi Sad	0	(0)
2012–2013	→ Mladost Bački Petrovac (loan)		
2013	Tekstilac Odžaci	15	(3)
2014–2017	Radomlje	83	(17)
2017–2019	Inđija	40	(10)
2019–2020	Budućnost Podgorica	43	(13)
2020	Radnički Niš	18	(4)
2021	Novi Pazar	18	(2)
2021–2022	TSC	12	(2)
2022	Radnički Kragujevac	20	(2)
2023	Turon Yaypan	10	(0)
2023–2025	Napredak Kruševac	55	(6)
2025–2026	Niki Volos	20	(2)
- * Club domestic league appearances and goals as of 20 April 2026

Dušan Stoiljković (Serbian Cyrillic: Душан Стоиљковић; born 5 September 1994) is a Serbian footballer who plays as a left winger.
