= Abbos Gulomov =

Uzbek footballer

Abbos Gʻulomov
Personal information
- Full name: Abbos Gʻulomov
- Date of birth: July 5, 1998 (age 28)
- Place of birth: Pop District, Uzbekistan
- Height: 1.70 m (5 ft 7 in)
- Position: Midfielder

Team information
- Current team: Navbahor Namangan
- Number: 70

Senior career*
Years	Team	Apps	(Gls)
2017	Xotira-79		
2017-2022	Navbahor Namangan	63	(2)
2018	Shurtan Guzar		
2022-2023	Neftchi Fargʻona	42	(2)
2024	Neftchi Fargʻona	25	(2)
2025-	Navbahor Namangan	42	(10)

International career
2017-2021	Uzbekistan U-23	3	(0)
- * Club domestic league appearances and goals as of 29 July 2026

Abbos Gulomov (born 5 July 1998) is an Uzbek midfielder. He currently plays for Navbahor Namangan.

== Playing career ==
Abbos, a footballer developed in Namangan, began his career at Namangan football academy under coaches Otabek Otaboev and Umarxon Otaxonov.

During 2017 season played for the Uychi District team Xotira-79. In the 2018 season he joined Navbahor Namangan, and after playing for the youth team for a short period he was loaned to Shurtan.

In the 2019 season he returned to Navbahor and signed a contract with the main team.

After playing three seasons for Navbahor, Abbos was loaned to Neftchi Fargʻona at the beginning of 2022 season. His contract with Navbahor expired in December 2023. In 2025 returned to Namangan and signed a new contract with Navbahor at the start of 2025 season, continuing his career at the club.
