= Botirali Ergashev =

Uzbekistani footballer (born 1995)

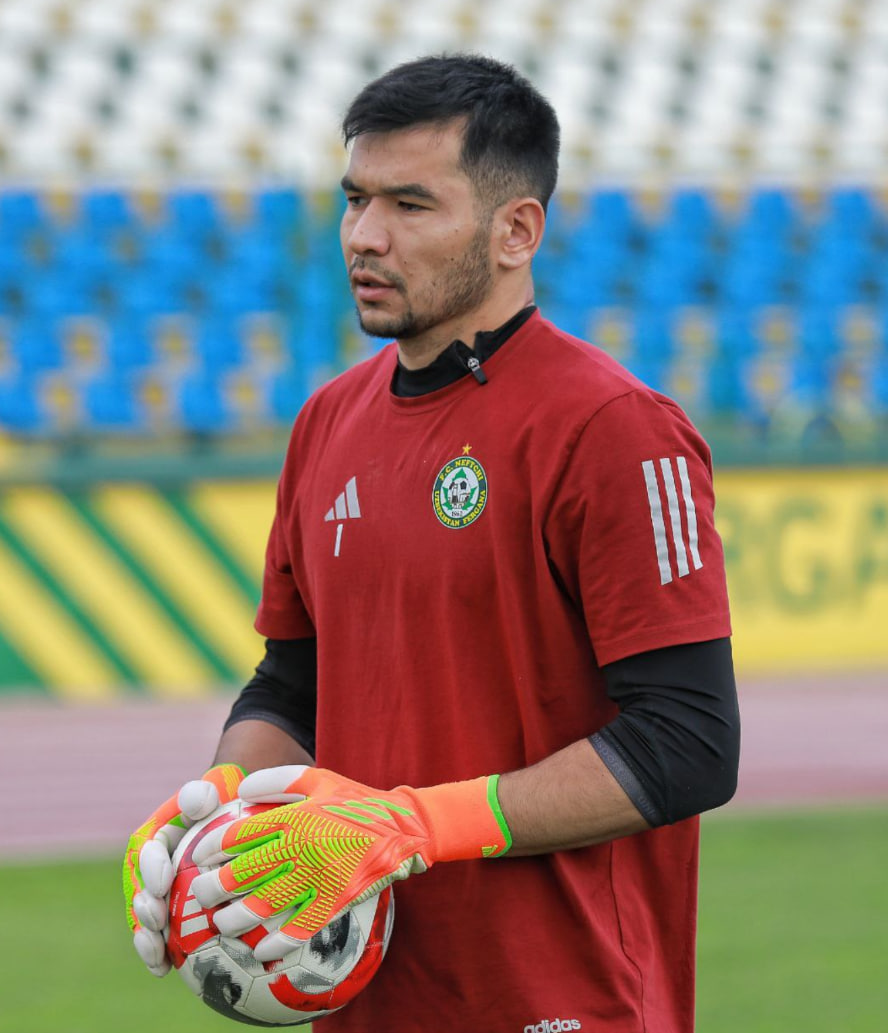
- Ergashev in 2025

Personal information
- Full name: Botirali Ergashev
- Date of birth: June 23, 1995 (age 31)
- Place of birth: Pap, Uzbekistan
- Height: 1.87 m (6 ft 2 in)
- Position: Goalkeeper

Team information
- Current team: FC Neftchi Fergana
- Number: 1

Youth career
- 2009–2016: Pakhtakor Tashkent

Senior career*
Years	Team	Apps	(Gls)
2016–2018	Pakhtakor Tashkent	2	(0)
2018–2019	Navbahor Namangan	14	(0)
2019-2020	Dinamo Samarqand	22	(0)
2020–2021	Kokand 1912	15	(0)
2021–2024	AGMK	45	(0)
2024–	Neftchi Fergana	57	(0)

International career^{‡}
2018	Uzbekistan U23	10	(0)
2019–	Uzbekistan	2	(0)
Medal record
Representing Uzbekistan
Men's football
AFC U-23 Championship
Winner	2018 China	Team
CAFA Nations Cup
Runner-up	2023 Kyrgyzstan–Uzbekistan	Team
Winner	2025 Tajikistan–Uzbekistan	Team
- * Club domestic league appearances and goals as of 20:10, 28 July 2026 (UTC) ‡ National team caps and goals as of 31 March 2015

Botirali Haydarali oʻgʻli Ergashev (Uzbek Cyrillic: Ботирали Ҳайдарали ўғли Эргашев; born 23 June 1995) is an Uzbekistani footballer who plays for Neftchi Fergana and Uzbekistan national team.

== International career ==
Ergashev made his debut for the Uzbekistan national football team in a 1–0 friendly loss to Iran on 19 May 2019.

On 2 June 2026, he was included in the 26-man squad selected by head coach Fabio Cannavaro for the 2026 FIFA World Cup, marking the country's first-ever appearance in the tournament.

== Career statistics ==
=== Club ===
As of match played 30 November 2024

Appearances and goals by club, season and competition
Club	Season	League			National Cup		League Cup		Continental		Other		Total	
Club	Season	Division	Apps	Goals	Apps	Goals	Apps	Goals	Apps	Goals	Apps	Goals	Apps	Goals
Pakhtakor Tashkent	2016	Uzbek League	1	0	—		—		—		—		1	0
Pakhtakor Tashkent	2017	Uzbek League	1	0	0	0	—		—		—		1	0
Pakhtakor Tashkent	Total		2	0	0	0	—		—		—		2	0
Navbahor Namangan	2018	Uzbekistan Super League	14	0	0	0	—		—		—		14	0
Neftchi Fergana	2019	Uzbekistan Super League	22	0	0	0	0	0	—		—		22	0
Kokand 1912	2020	Uzbekistan Super League	14	0	1	0	—		—		—		15	0
AGMK	2021	Uzbekistan Super League	7	0	0	0	—		2	0	—		9	0
AGMK	2022	Uzbekistan Super League	20	0	3	0	—		—		—		23	0
AGMK	2023	Uzbekistan Super League	18	0	7	0	—		5	0	—		25	0
AGMK	Total		45	0	10	0	—		7	0	—		62	0
Neftchi Fergana	2024	Uzbekistan Super League	17	0	2	0	—		—		—		19	0
Career total			114	0	13	0	0	0	7	0	0	0	134	0

=== International ===
As of match played 13 October 2023

Appearances and goals by national team and year
National team	Year	Apps	Goals
Uzbekistan	2018	1	0
Uzbekistan	2019	0	0
Uzbekistan	2020	0	0
Uzbekistan	2021	0	0
Uzbekistan	2022	0	0
Uzbekistan	2023	1	0
Uzbekistan	2024	0	0
Uzbekistan	2025	0	0
Total		2	0
