= Toma Tabatadze =

Georgian footballer (born 1991)

Personal information
- Full name: Toma Tabatadze
- Date of birth: 25 September 1991 (age 35)
- Place of birth: Tbilisi, Georgia
- Height: 1.92 m (6 ft 3 1/2 in)
- Position: Forward

Team information
- Current team: Kokand 1912
- Number: 22

Senior career*
Years	Team	Apps	(Gls)
2011	Olimp/RFSH	17	(4)
2011	Kruoja	15	(4)
2013–2014	Nigde Beledie	?	(?)
2014–2015	Bartinspor	?	(?)
2015	Karadere Spor	?	(?)
2015–2016	Afjet Afenspor	?	(?)
2016–2017	Eskishehirspor Kurtulushspor	?	(?)
2017–2018	Serik Belediespor	?	(?)
2018–2019	Somaspor	25	(21)
2019	Margusa Tyurk Gyudju	?	(?)
2020	Rustavi	18	(13)
2021–2022	Saburtalo	13	(0)
2021–2022	→ Sioni (loan)	36	(13)
2022	Akzhayik	12	(3)
2023	Neftchi	13	(6)
2023–2024	Navbahor	30	(13)
2025	Neftchi	12	(1)
2025	Bukhara	20	(7)
2026–	Kokand 1912	11	(3)
- * Club domestic league appearances and goals as of 28 July 2026

Toma Tabatadze (Georgian: თომა ტაბატაძე; born 25 September 1991) – is a Georgian footballer who plays as a forward for Uzbekistan Super League club Kokand 1912.

== Club career ==
In January 2021, he signed a contract with the Georgian club Saburtalo.

In July 2021, he moved to the Georgian club Sioni Bolnisi on loan.

In July 2022, he signed a contract with FC Akzhayik. On July 3, 2022, Akzhayik made his debut in the Kazakhstan Premier League in a 0–2 defeat to FC Kairat.

In January 2023, he signed a contract with the club "Neftchi" of Fergana.

In July 2023, he transferred to FC Navbahor of Namangan and signed a 1.5-year contract. At the Navbahor club, he played as a taran forward and scored 18 goals in 43 matches.

At the end of the 2024 season, he left Navbahor and signed a contract with Fergana's Neftchi.

After a single season in 2025 at FK Bukhara he transferred to fellow league club Kokand 1912 for the 2026 season.

== Honours ==
Akzkaik

- Kazakhstan Cup finalist: 2022

Navbahor

- Uzbekistan Cup finalist: 2024
- Uzbekistan Super League runner-up: 2023
- Uzbekistan Super League third place: 2024
