= Giorgi Nikabadze =

Georgian association football player

Personal information
- Date of birth: 10 January 1991 (age 35)
- Place of birth: Kutaisi, Georgia
- Height: 1.88 m (6 ft 2 in)
- Position: Forward

Team information
- Current team: Telavi
- Number: 10

Senior career*
| Years | Team | Apps | (Gls) |
| 2012–2013 | Banga | 32 | (5) |
| 2013–2014 | Guria | 8 | (1) |
| 2014–2016 | Alazani | 25 | (39) |
| 2016 | Kolkheti 1913 | 23 | (2) |
| 2017–2018 | Telavi | 26 | (1) |
| 2019–2020 | Merani | 35 | (26) |
| 2020–2021 | Dinamo Batumi | 37 | (9) |
| 2021–2022 | Gudja United | 8 | (0) |
| 2022–2023 | Samgurali | 36 | (14) |
| 2023 | Neftchi | 12 | (3) |
| 2024–2025 | Novbahor | 16 | (2) |
| 2025 | Atyrau | 0 | (0) |
| 2026– | Telavi | 17 | (6) |
- * Club domestic league appearances and goals as of 11 July 2026

Giorgi Nikabadze (Georgian: გიორგი ნიქაბაძე; born 10 January 1991) is a Georgian footballer who plays as a forward for Liga 2 club Telavi.

He won the Georgian Erovnuli in 2021 with Dinamo Batumi. He also finished as the top scorer in Liga 2 and has been among the leading goal scorers for several teams over the course of his career.

== Career ==
Nikabadze has played in five countries. A Lyga side Banga was the first club where he spent a full season.

In 2018, he netted ten goals for newly promoted Liga 2 club Telavi. A year later, while at Merani Tbilisi, Nikabadze became a league topscorer and major contributor to his team's promotion to Erovnuli Liga.

The next summer, he moved to title-chasing Dinamo Batumi. On 21 November 2020, when the Batumi Stadium was officially opened, Nikabadze netted against Dila Gori to become the first goalscorer in the history of this arena. Nikabadze won the champion's title with his team in 2021.

After a short spell in Malta, in May 2022 Nikabadze signed for Samgurali. In 2023, with nine goals scored against the league opponents, he finished as best striker of the team despite his departure in mid-season. In the summer transfer window, he left for Uzbekistan, initially to sign for Neftchi Fergana and later for Novbahor.

== Statistics ==
=== Club ===
As of match played 11 July 2026

Appearances and goals by club, season and competition
| Club | Season | League | | | National cup | | Continental | | Other | | Total | |
| Club | Season | Division | Apps | Goals | Apps | Goals | Apps | Goals | Apps | Goals | Apps | Goals |
|---|---|---|---|---|---|---|---|---|---|---|---|---|
| Banga | 2012 | A Lyga | 25 | 5 | – | | – | | – | | 25 | 5 |
| Banga | 2013 | A Lyga | 7 | 0 | – | | – | | – | | 7 | 0 |
| Banga | Total | | 32 | 5 | 0 | 0 | 0 | 0 | 0 | 0 | 32 | 5 |
| Guria | 2013/14 | Umaglesi Liga | 8 | 1 | – | | – | | – | | 8 | 1 |
| Alazani | 2014/15 | Meore Liga | 16 | 24 | – | | – | | – | | 16 | 24 |
| Alazani | 2015/16 | Meore Liga | 9 | 15 | – | | – | | – | | 9 | 15 |
| Alazani | Total | | 25 | 39 | 0 | 0 | 0 | 0 | 0 | 0 | 25 | 39 |
| Kolkheti 1913 | 2015/16 | Umaglesi Liga | 12 | 2 | – | | – | | – | | 12 | 2 |
| Kolkheti 1913 | 2016 | Umaglesi Liga | 11 | 0 | 2 | 1 | – | | – | | 13 | 1 |
| Kolkheti 1913 | Total | | 23 | 2 | 2 | 1 | 0 | 0 | 0 | 0 | 25 | 3 |
| Telavi | 2017 | Liga 3 | | | | | | | 2 (Note: Appearances in play-offs) | 1 | 2 | 1 |
| Telavi | 2018 | Erovnuli Liga 2 | 26 | 10 | 4 | 1 | – | | – | | 30 | 11 |
| Telavi | Total | | 26 | 10 | 4 | 1 | 0 | 0 | 2 | 1 | 32 | 12 |
| Merani Tbilisi | 2019 | Erovnuli Liga 2 | 33 | 26 | 3 | 0 | – | | – | | 36 | 26 |
| Merani Tbilisi | 2020 | Erovnuli Liga | 2 | 0 | – | | – | | – | | 2 | 0 |
| Merani Tbilisi | Total | | 35 | 26 | 3 | 0 | 0 | 0 | 0 | 0 | 38 | 26 |
| Dinamo Batumi | 2020 | Erovnuli Liga | 15 | 5 | 1 | 0 | 1 (Note: Appearances in UEFA Europa League) | 0 | – | | 17 | 5 |
| Dinamo Batumi | 2021 | Erovnuli Liga | 22 | 4 | 2 | 1 | 2 (Note: Appearances in UEFA Conference League) | 0 | – | | 26 | 5 |
| Dinamo Batumi | Total | | 37 | 9 | 3 | 1 | 3 | 0 | 0 | 0 | 43 | 10 |
| Gudja United | 2021/22 | Maltese Premier League | 8 | 0 | 1 | 0 | – | | – | | 9 | 0 |
| Samgurali | 2022 | Erovnuli Liga | 18 | 5 | – | | – | | – | | 18 | 5 |
| Samgurali | 2023 | Erovnuli Liga | 18 | 9 | – | | – | | – | | 18 | 9 |
| Samgurali | Total | | 36 | 14 | 0 | 0 | 0 | 0 | 0 | 0 | 36 | 14 |
| Neftchi | 2023 | Uzbekistan Super League | 12 | 3 | – | | – | | – | | 12 | 3 |
| Novbahor | 2024 | Uzbekistan Super League | 16 | 2 | 5 | 1 | 2 (Note: Appearances in Asian Champions League) | 0 | 0 | 0 | 23 | 3 |
| Telavi | 2026 | Erovnuli Liga 2 | 17 | 6 | 0 | 0 | – | | – | | 17 | 6 |
| Career total | | | 275 | 117 | 18 | 4 | 5 | 0 | 2 | 1 | 300 | 122 |

== Honours ==
=== Club ===
Dinamo Batumi

- Erovnuli Liga (1): 2021

=== Individual ===
Liga 2 topscorer (1): 2019
