= Yuriy Batyushyn =

Ukrainian footballer

Personal information
- Full name: Yuriy Valentynovych Batyushyn
- Date of birth: 7 December 1992 (age 33)
- Place of birth: Alchevsk, Ukraine
- Height: 1.80 m (5 ft 11 in)
- Position: Central midfielder

Youth career
- 1999–2009: Stal Alchevsk

Senior career*
Years	Team	Apps	(Gls)
2011–2015	Stal Alchevsk	84	(13)
2015–2017	Mykolaiv	57	(9)
2017–2021	Hirnyk-Sport Horishni Plavni	88	(14)
2021–2022	Metalist 1925 Kharkiv	30	(9)
2022	Dila Gori	13	(1)
2023	Neftchi Fergana	6	(0)
2023–2024	Sokół Sieniawa	9	(1)
2024	Ravshan Kulob	8	(1)
- * Club domestic league appearances and goals as of 7 December 2024

Yuriy Valentynovych Batyushyn (Ukrainian: Юрій Валентинович Батюшин; born 7 December 1992) is a Ukrainian professional footballer who plays as a midfielder.

== Career ==
=== Stal Alchevsk ===
Yuriy Batyushyn was born on 7 December 1992 in Alchevsk. He is a youth product of Stal Alchevsk, where he played for the youth squads from 1999 to 2009. He played 78 matches and scored nine goals in the Ukrainian Youth League for Stal. From 2008 to 2011 he played for Stal-2 Alchevsk in the Luhansk Oblast Championship. He made his senior debut on 24 July 2011 against Odesa, coming on in the 90th minute for Anton Postupalenko. He scored his first goal for Stal on 29 October against Lviv. During his tenure at Stal, he played 84 matches and scored 13 goals.

=== Mykolaiv ===
At the end of April 2015, he joined Mykolaiv. He made his debut for Mykolaiv on 25 April against Sumy. Yuriy was named to the starting lineup, and in the 29th minute he was replaced by Andriy Burdiyan. His debut goal came on 23 May against Poltava.

At the end of the first half of the 2020–21 season, he was named as the best central midfielder of the Ukrainian First League according to the online edition SportArena.

=== Metalist 1925 Kharkiv ===
On 25 December 2020 he signed with Metalist 1925 Kharkiv.

=== Dila Gori ===
In summer 2022, he moved to Dila Gori.
