= Istiqlol Stadium =

Stadium in Fergana, Uzbekistan

- Uzbek: Istiqlol stadioni
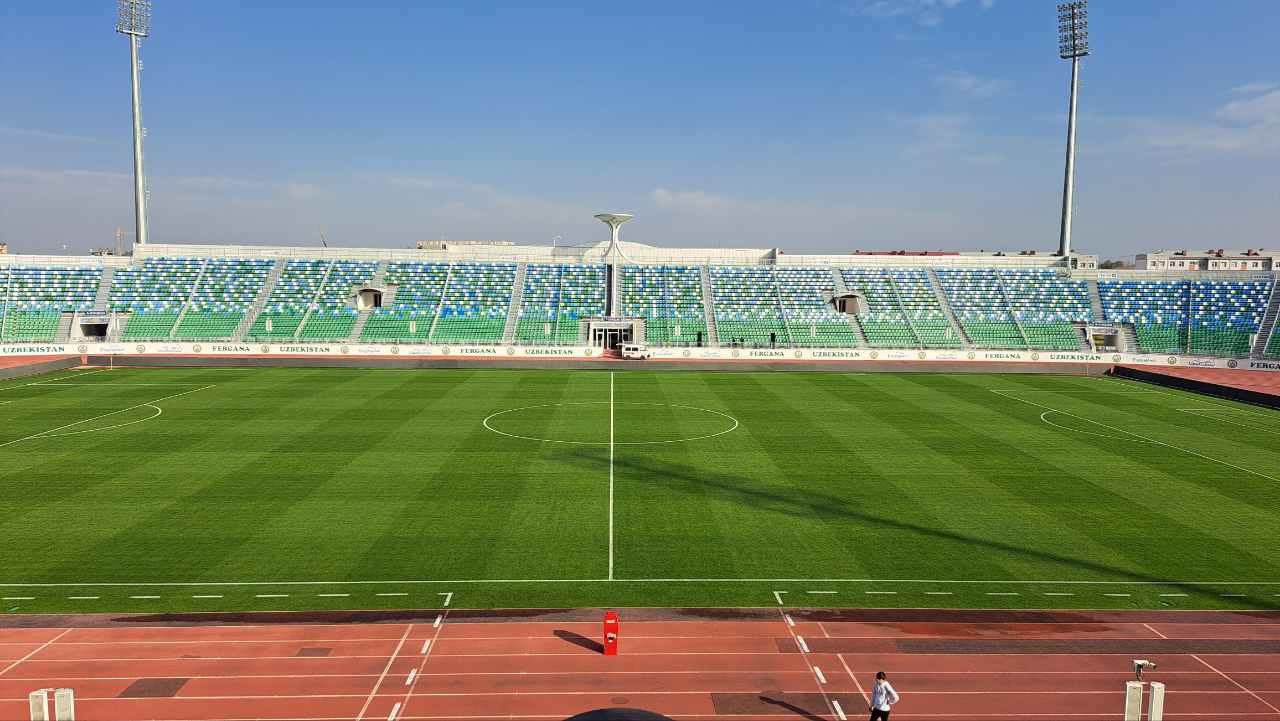
- UZB
- Interactive map of Istiqlol Stadium
- Location: Small ring road of Fergana, Uzbekistan
- Coordinates: 40.3905°N 71.7497°E
- Owner: Neftchi Fergana
- Operator: FC Neftchi
- Capacity: 20,500 (2015–present)
- Surface: Grass
- Record attendance: More 21,000
- Field size: 107 m × 95 m (117 yd × 104 yd)

Construction
- Built: 2013–2015
- Opened: 21 March 2015; 11 years ago
- Renovated: 2021–2022
- General contractor: Government of Fergana Region

Tenants
- FC Neftchi (2015–present); Uzbekistan national football team (2015–present); Uzbekistan U-16, U-17, U-20, U-23 and Women national teams

The Istiqlol Stadium (Uzbek: Istiqlol stadioni) is a football stadium in Fergana, the capital of Fergana Region, Uzbekistan. The stadium is located 2 kilometers north of Fergana International Airport, along the Small Ring Road. The stadium is designed for 20,500 spectators and thus is the sixth largest stadium in Uzbekistan in terms of capacity. It is considered to be the main home arena of Neftchi Fergana and one of the stadiums used by Uzbekistan national football team.

== Overview ==
The construction of the stadium began in January 2013 near the Fergana International Airport. The stadium was built in a new area because the old Fargona Stadium in Fergana was too small for the attendance of fans. The construction of the stadium was completed in January 2015. The main contractor of the stadium is the government of Fergana Region, and it is said that more than $15 million was spent during the construction and assembly works. The opening match of the new stadium was held on April 3, 2015, a friendly match between Uzbekistan U-20 and New Zealand U-20 national teams, and the home team's 1: ended with a 0–0 victory. The first official League match at the new stadium was played on 18 April 2015 with match Neftchi – Mash'al Mubarek. The distance between the field and the tribune is 15 meters. The number of sectors in the stadium is 32.

The stadium was also used as a home stadium by Istiqlol Fergana of Fergana from 2017 to 2022.

== Recent tournament results ==
Istiqlol Stadium hosted six matches during the 2023 AFC U-20 Asian Cup.

Date	Time	Team No. 1	Result	Team No. 2	Round	Attendance
1 March 2023	15:00	Australia	0–1	Vietnam	Group B	5,715
1 March 2023	19:00	Qatar	0–1	Iran	Group B	6,120
4 March 2023	15:00	Iran	2–3	Australia	Group B	1,154
4 March 2023	19:00	Vietnam	2–1	Qatar	Group B	1,024
7 March 2023	15:00	Vietnam	1–3	Iran	Group B	982
7 March 2022	19:00	Uzbekistan	0–0	Indonesia	Group A	18,006
