= 2022 Uzbekistan Super League =

Season of top level football in Uzbekistan

Uzbekistan Super League
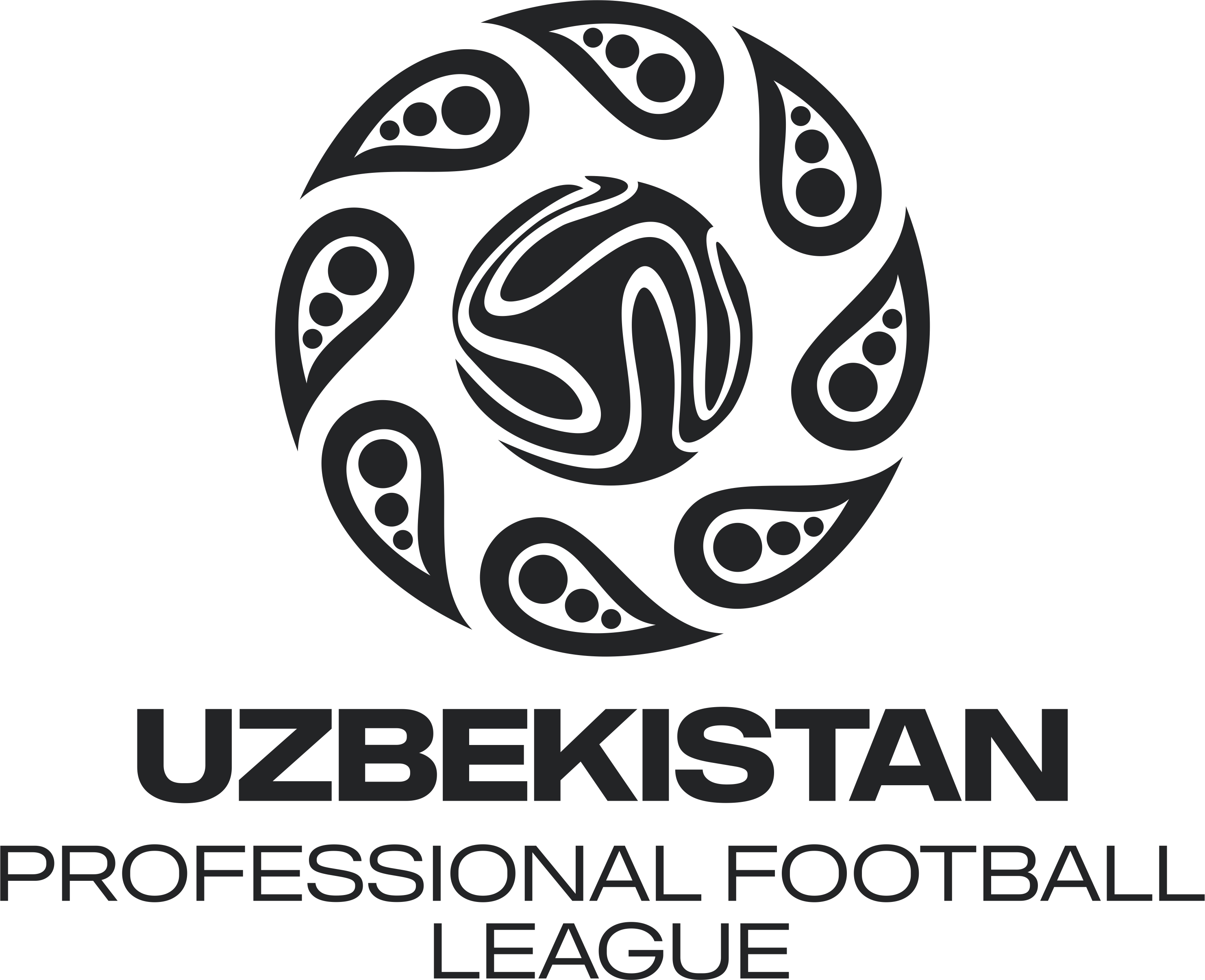
- Season: 2022
- Champions: Pakhtakor Tashkent (15th title)
- Relegated: Lokomotiv Tashkent; Kokand 1912; Dinamo Samarqand
- AFC Champions League: Pakhtakor Tashkent; Navbahor Namangan; Nasaf; AGMK
- Matches: 182
- Goals: 428 (2.35 per match)
- Top goalscorer: Dragan Ćeran (20)
- Biggest home win: AGMK 6–0 Olimpik (7 November 2022); Paxtakor 6–0 Qizilqum (7 November 2022)
- Biggest away win: Surxon 0–5 Olimpik (1 August 2022)
- Highest scoring: Surxon 2–4 Soʻgʻdiyona (18 May 2022)
- Longest winning run: Pakhatkor
- Longest winless run: Dinamo
- Longest losing run: Surkhon
- Highest attendance: 26231 (6 May 2022, Navbahor 2-1 Bunyodkor, Namangan)
- Lowest attendance: 208 (29 June 2022, Surxon 1-1 Neftchi, OKMK)
- Total attendance: 660165
- All statistics correct as of 25 November 2022.

The 2022 Uzbekistan Super League (in Uzbek: Футбол бўйича 2022-йилги Ўзбекистон Суперлигаси) known as the Coca-Cola Uzbekistan Super League was the 32nd season of top-level football in Uzbekistan since its establishment on 1992. Pakhtakor Tashkent were the defending champions from the 2021 campaign, and successfully defended their title. This season, 14 clubs took part. The tournament was traditionally held according to the "spring-autumn" system. In July, the league had a summer break between the first and second rounds. The championship was held in 26 rounds. Matches were held in the evening on the last days of the week (Friday, Saturday and Sunday). Only those teams that fully fulfilled all the required conditions for licensing clubs were admitted to the Super League.

== Teams ==
Location of teams in 2022 Uzbekistan Super League

Club	Coach	Location	Stadium	Capacity	Kit sponsor	Shirt sponsor
AGMK	(Uzbekistan) Mirjalol Qosimov	Olmaliq	AGMK Stadium	12,000	(Germany) Jako	Almalyk Mining and Metallurgical Combine
Bunyodkor	(Montenegro) Ivan Bošković	Tashkent	Milliy Stadium	34,000	(Germany) Jako	Uzbekneftegaz
Dinamo Samarqand	(Uzbekistan) Vadim Abramov	Samarkand	Dinamo Stadium	16,000	(Spain) Joma	Agromir Buildings
Kokand 1912	(Uzbekistan) Bakhtiyor Ashurmatov	Kokand	Markaziy Stadium	10,500	(Germany) Jako	Bazis^{1}
Lokomotiv	(Uzbekistan) Server Djeparov	Tashkent	Lokomotiv Stadium	8,000	(Germany) Adidas	Orient Finance Bank, Uztelecom ^{1}, Drivers Village ^{1}
Metallurg	(Spain) Luisma Hernández	Bekabad	Metallurg Bekabad Stadium	15,000	(Germany) Adidas	Uzbekistan Metallurgy Combinat
Nasaf	(Uzbekistan) Ruziqul Berdiev	Qarshi	Markaziy Stadium	16,000	(Germany) Adidas	Uzbekistan GTL SGCC, ENTER Engineering^{1}
Navbahor	(Uzbekistan) Samvel Babayan	Namangan	Markaziy Stadium	22,000	(Germany) Jako	Namangan City
Neftchi Fergana	(Tajikistan) Vitaly Levchenko	Fergana	Istiqlol Stadium	20,000	(Spain) Joma	FNQIZ
Olympic Tashkent	(Uzbekistan) Timur Kapadze	Tashkent	JAR Stadium	8,500	(Spain) Joma	Trustbank
Pakhtakor	(Uzbekistan) Maksim Shatskikh	Tashkent	Central Stadium	35,000	(Germany) Adidas	Akfa
Qizilqum	(Serbia) Nikola Lazarevic	Navoiy	Youth Sports Complex	12,500	(Germany) Jako	Navoi Mining and Metallurgy Combinat
Sogdiana	(Uzbekistan) Ulugbek Bakayev	Jizzakh	Sogdiana Stadium	11,650	(Spain) Joma	BMB Energo
Surkhon	(Spain) Miguel Álvarez	Termez	Alpamish Stadium	6,000	(Germany) Adidas	Uzbekgidrenergo

=== Managerial changes ===
Team	Outgoing manager	Manner of departure	Date of vacancy	Position in table	Replaced by	Date of appointment	Ref.
Dinamo	(Tajikistan) Khakim Fuzailov	End of contract	23 December 2021	Preseason	(Serbia) Predrag Rogan	8 January 2022	
Lokomotiv	(Portugal) Micael Sequeira			Preseason	(Uzbekistan) Denis Korostichenko	15 December 2021	
Pakhtakor	(Netherlands) Pieter Huistra	End of contract	10 January 2022	Preseason	(North Macedonia) Slavče Vojneski	11 January 2022	
Qizilqum	(Uzbekistan) Hamidjon Aktamov			Preseason	(Serbia) Nikola Lazarevic	20 January 2022	
Surkhon Termez	(Uzbekistan) Rifat Akramkhujaev			Preseason	(Spain) Jordi Fabregat	20 January 2022	
Surkhon Termez	(Spain) Jordi Fabregat			Preseason	(Spain) Ángel López	February 2022	
Pakhtakor	(North Macedonia) Slavče Vojneski	Mutual termination	7 June 2022	3rd	(Uzbekistan) Maksim Shatskikh	15 July 2022	
Neftchi Fergana	(Uzbekistan) Ilkhom Muminjonov	Resigned	2 July 2022	13th	(Tajikistan) Vitaly Levchenko	2 July 2022	
Bunyodkor	(Uzbekistan) Shukhrat Maqsudov	resigned			(Uzbekistan) Viktor Karpenko	2022	
Dinamo Samarqand	(Serbia) Predrag Rogan	resigned		14th	(Uzbekistan) Vadim Abramov	2022	
Surkhon Termez	(Spain) Ángel López	resigned		13th	(Spain) Miguel Álvarez	9 September 2022	
Lokomotiv Tashkent	(Uzbekistan) Denis Korostichenko	resigned			(Uzbekistan) Server Djeparov	12 December 2022	
Bunyodkor	(Uzbekistan) Viktor Karpenko	resigned			(Montenegro) Ivan Bošković	2022	

== Foreign players ==
The number of foreign players is restricted to five per USL team. A team can use only five foreign players on the field in each game.

Club	Player 1	Player 2	Player 3	Player 4	AFC players	Former players
AGMK	(Georgia (country)) **Giorgi Papava**	(Iran) Siavash Hagh Nazari	(Italy) Martin Boakye	(Moldova) **Dan Spătaru**	(Tajikistan) **Alisher Dzhalilov**	(Ukraine) Oleksandr Kasyan (Ukraine) Andriy Mishchenko
Bunyodkor	(Ghana) Francis Narh	(Nigeria) Ibrahim Tomiwa	(Russia) **Pavel Mogilevets**	(Serbia) Dimitrije Pobulić	(Tajikistan) **Davronjon Ergashev**	(Kyrgyzstan) **Odilzhon Abdurakhmanov**
Dinamo Samarqand	(Georgia (country)) **Elgujja Grigalashvili**	(Serbia) Miloje Preković	(Serbia) Mihailo Jovanović	(Ukraine) Yevhen Chumak		(Bosnia and Herzegovina) Aleksandar Glišić
Kokand 1912	(Serbia) Ivan Josović	(Serbia) Slavko Lukić				
Lokomotiv Tashkent	(Cameroon) Jerome Mpacko Etame	(Georgia (country)) **Kakhi Makharadze**	(Nigeria) Samuel Opeh		(Tajikistan) **Manuchekhr Safarov**	
Metallurg Bekabad	(Bosnia and Herzegovina) Kerim Palić				(Tajikistan) Daler Sharipov	
Nasaf	(Brazil) Mateus Lima	(Russia) Ivan Solovyov	(Serbia) Alen Mašović	(Serbia) Marko Stanojević		(Bosnia and Herzegovina) Semir Smajlagić
Navbahor Namangan	(Serbia) Bojan Ciger	(Serbia) **Jovan Đokić**	(Serbia) Zoran Marušić	(Ukraine) Oleksandr Kasyan	(Kyrgyzstan) **Mirlan Murzayev**	(Georgia (country)) **Elgujja Grigalashvili** (Tajikistan) **Ehson Panjshanbe**
Neftchi Fergana	(Russia) Yevgeni Konyukhov	(Serbia) Darko Stanojević	(Ukraine) Oleksiy Larin	(Ukraine) Andriy Mishchenko		(Serbia) Aleksandar Ješić (Serbia) Marko Šarić (Serbia) Danijel Stojković
Olympic Tashkent						
Pakhtakor Tashkent	(Montenegro) **Ilija Martinović**	(Poland) Przemysław Banaszak	(Serbia) Dragan Ćeran	(Ukraine) Oleksandr Nasonov		(Bulgaria) **Kamen Hadzhiev** (Montenegro) Oliver Sarkic (Ukraine) Oleksiy Larin
Qizilqum Zarafshon	(Estonia) **Artjom Dmitrijev**	(Nigeria) Paul Komolafe	(Russia) Oleg Tolmasov	(Serbia) Aleksandar Stanisavljević		(Argentina) Gonzalo Ritacco
Sogdiana Jizzakh	(Croatia) Jure Obšivač	(Serbia) Luka Čermelj	(Serbia) Marko Kolaković	(Serbia) Milan Mitrović		
Surkhon Termez	(Dominican Republic) **Luismi Quezada**	(Spain) Manel Martínez	(Spain) Sergio Rodríguez	(Spain) Rubén Sánchez	(Tajikistan) **Zoir Dzhuraboyev**	(Serbia) Miroslav Marković (Spain) Javi Jiménez

In bold: Players that have been capped for their national team.

== League table ==
Pos	Team	Pld	W	D	L	GF	GA	GD	Pts	Qualification or relegation
1	Pakhtakor	26	15	9	2	47	18	+29	54	Qualification to the AFC Champions League group stage
2	Navbahor	26	15	8	3	33	15	+18	53	Qualification to the AFC Champions League preliminary round
3	Nasaf (Note: Nasaf qualified to the AFC Champions League as 2022 Uzbekistan Cup champions.)	26	13	10	3	37	16	+21	49	Qualification to the AFC Champions League group stage
4	AGMK	26	13	5	8	44	23	+21	44	Qualification to the AFC Champions League preliminary round
5	Qizilqum	26	12	3	11	34	36	−2	39	
6	Olympic	26	7	14	5	31	28	+3	35	
7	Sogdiana	26	9	7	10	31	31	0	34	
8	Bunyodkor	26	9	7	10	29	37	−8	34	
9	Neftchi	26	8	8	10	31	32	−1	32	
10	Metallurg	26	8	8	10	19	27	−8	32	
11	Surkhon	26	7	5	14	25	44	−19	26	
12	Lokomotiv (Q)	26	6	6	14	22	36	−14	24	Relegation play off Uzbekistan Pro League
13	Kokand 1912 (R)	26	4	10	12	21	38	−17	22	Relegation to Uzbekistan Pro League
14	Dinamo (R)	26	3	6	17	24	47	−23	15	Relegation to Uzbekistan Pro League

Updated to match(es) played on 12 November 2022. Source: Uzbekistan Professional Football League
Rules for classification: 1) points; 2) head-to-head points; 3) head-to-head goal difference; 4) head-to-head away goals scored; 5) goal difference; 6) number of goals scored.
(Q) Qualified for the phase indicated; (R) Relegated

=== Round 1 ===
2 March 2022 1	Neftchi	1–0	Kokand 1912	Fargʻona
	Ubaydullayev 89'	Match report (in Uzbek)		Stadium: Uzbekistan; Referee: Ahrol Risqullayev

2 March 2022 2	Olimpik	0–0	Surxon	Toshkent
		Match report (in Uzbek)		Stadium: Paxtakor; Referee: Asker Najafaliyev

3 March 2022 3	Bunyodkor	0–0	Soʻgʻdiyona	Toshkent
		Match report (in Uzbek)		Stadium: Lokomotiv; Referee: Shavkat Nasibullayev

3 March 2022 4	Dinamo	0–2	Paxtakor	Samarqand
		Match report (in Uzbek)	Ćeran 31'; Erkinov 34'	Stadium: Dinamo; Referee: Shavkat Nasibullayev

3 March 2022 5	Navbahor	0–0	Nasaf	Namangan
		Match report (in Uzbek)		Stadium: Navbahor; Referee: Ilgiz Tantashev

4 March 2022 6	Qizilqum	2–0	Lokomotiv	Olmaliq
	Boydullayev 57'; Stanisavljević 73'	Match report (in Uzbek)		Stadium: OKMK; Referee: Rustam Lutfullin

4 March 2022 7	Metallurg	1–0	AGMK	Bekobod
	Norbekov 23'	Match report (in Uzbek)		Stadium: Metallurg

=== Round 2 ===
9 March 2022 1	Kokand 1912	1–0	Olimpik	Fargʻona
	Xolmuhammedov 16' (o.g.)	Match report (in Uzbek)		Stadium: Uzbekistan; Referee: Aziz Asimov

9 March 2022 2	Nasaf	1–1	Metallurg	Qarshi
	Norchayev 80'	Match report (in Uzbek)	Toshqoʻziyev 90'	Stadium: Qarshi; Referee: Aziz Asimov

9 March 2022 3	Paxtakor	1–0	Neftchi	Toshkent
	Ćeran 52'	Match report (in Uzbek)		Stadium: Paxtakor; Referee: Rustam Lutfullin

10 March 2022 4	Surxon	1–2	Navbahor	Samarqand
	Marković 89'	Match report (in Uzbek)	Grigalashvili 6'; Marušić 54'	Stadium: Dinamo; Referee: Akobirxoʻja Shukurullayev

10 March 2022 5	Qizilqum	3–1	Bunyodkor	Olmaliq
	Joʻrayev 45+1'; Abduxoliqov 47'; Stanisavljević 75'	Match report (in Uzbek)	Joʻrayev 90+2'	Stadium: OKMK; Referee: Akobirxoʻja Shukurullayev

11 March 2022 6	Lokomotiv	2–1	AGMK	Toshkent
	Gʻulomov 42'; Qodirqulov 70'	Match report (in Uzbek)	Gʻiyosov 41'	Stadium: Lokomotiv; Referee: Elyor Tursunov

11 March 2022 7	Soʻgʻdiyona	1–0	Dinamo	Jizzax
	Norxonov 66'	Match report (in Uzbek)		Stadium: Soʻgʻdiyona; Referee: Rahimbek Karimov

=== Round 3 ===
16 March 2022 1	Metallurg	0–0	Surxon	Bekobod
		Match report (in Uzbek)		Stadium: Metallurg; Referee: Vadim Agishev

16 March 2022 2	Olimpik	1–1	Paxtakor	Toshkent
	Jiyanov 5'	Match report (in Uzbek)	Sayfiyev 22'	Stadium: Paxtakor; Referee: Elyor Tursunov

17 March 2022 3	Navbahor	2–0	Kokand 1912	Namangan
	Grigalashvili 45'; Marušić 81'	Match report (in Uzbek)		Stadium: Navbahor; Referee: Rahimbek Karimov

17 March 2022 4	Dinamo	0–0	Qizilqum	Samarqand
		Match report (in Uzbek)		Stadium: Dinamo

18 March 2022 5	Neftchi	1–2	Soʻgʻdiyona	Namangan
	Ubaydullayev 81'	Match report (in Uzbek)	Joʻrabekov 9'; Čermelj 38'	Stadium: Navbahor; Referee: Akobirxoʻja Shukurullayev

18 March 2022 6	Bunyodkor	2–1	Lokomotiv	Toshkent
	Tomiva 64', 79'; Oʻlmasaliyev 90+2' (o.g.)	Match report (in Uzbek)		Stadium: Bunyodkor; Referee: Ahrol Risqullayev

26 June 2022 7	AGMK	2–2	Nasaf	Olmaliq
	Hagh Nazari 66'; Boakye 75'	Match report (in Uzbek)	Norchayev 26'; Abdurahimov 82'	Stadium: OKMK; Referee: Ilgiz Tantashev

=== Round 4 ===
31 March 2022 1	Kokand 1912	1–0	Metallurg	Fargʻona
	Siddiqov 74'	Match report (in Uzbek)		Stadium: Uzbekistan; Referee: Ilgiz Tantashev

31 March 2022 2	Bunyodkor	2–1	Dinamo	Toshkent
	Rahmonaliyev 84'; Oʻlmasaliyev 90+3'	Match report (in Uzbek)	Rashidov 16'	Stadium: Bunyodkor; Referee: Rustam Lutfullin

1 April 2022 3	Surxon	1–2	AGMK	Samarqand
	Marković 51'	Match report (in Uzbek)	Gʻiyosov 15'; Boakye 75'	Stadium: Dinamo

1 April 2022 4	Qizilqum	3–0	Neftchi	Olmaliq
	Abduxoliqov 50', 66'; Stanisavljević 29'	Match report (in Uzbek)		Stadium: OKMK

1 April 2022 5	Paxtakor	1–0	Navbahor	Toshkent
	Ćeran 83'	Match report (in Uzbek)		Stadium: Paxtakor

2 April 2022 6	Soʻgʻdiyona	1–1	Olimpik	Jizzax
	Joʻraqoʻziyev 90+3'	Match report (in Uzbek)	Norxonov 78'	Stadium: Soʻgʻdiyona

2 April 2022 7	Lokomotiv	0–1	Nasaf	Toshkent
		Match report (in Uzbek)	Nurulloyev 59'	Stadium: Lokomotiv

=== Round 5 ===
25 April 2022 1	Nefchi	1–3	Bunyodkor	Fargʻona
	Ješić 51'	Match report (in Uzbek)	Narh 56'; Ismonaliyev 63'; Rahmonaliyev 70'	Stadium: Uzbekistan

25 April 2022 2	Dinamo	3–1	Lokomotiv	Samarqand
	Yovanovich 13'; Rashidov 59'; Alimov 97'	Match report (in Uzbek)	Hasanov 19'	Stadium: Dinamo

26 April 2022 3	Navbahor	1–2	Soʻgʻdiyona	Namangan
	Marušić 32'	Match report (in Uzbek)	Norxonov 12'; Abdumannopov 90+2'	Stadium: Navbahor

26 April 2022 4	Olimpik	0–1	Qizilqum	Toshkent
		Match report (in Uzbek)	Shoahmedov 28'	Stadium: Lokomotiv

27 April 2022 5	AGMK	3–0	Kokand 1912	Olmaliq
	Tursunov 22'; Shixov 49' (o.g.); Hagh Nazari 90+2'	Match report (in Uzbek)		Stadium: OKMK; Referee: Asker Najafaliyev

4 July 2022 6	Metallurg	0–2	Paxtakor	Bekobod
		Match report (in Uzbek)	Turg‘unboyev 65'; Fayzullayev 67'	Stadium: Metallurg; Referee: Elyor Tursunov

4 July 2022 7	Nasaf	2–0	Surxon	Qarshi
	Norchayev 28'; Solovyov 50'	Match report (in Uzbek)		Stadium: Qarshi; Referee: Akobirxoʻja Shukurullayev

=== Round 6 ===
30 April 2022 1	Olimpik	1–5	Bunyodkor	Toshkent
	Tomiva 49'	Match report (in Uzbek)	Boʻriyev 9'; Jiyanov 29'; Odilov 37'; Anvarov 73'; Xoldorxonov 90+1'	Stadium: Bunyodkor; Referee: Elyor Tursunov

30 April 2022 2	Dinamo	1–1	Neftchi	Samarqand
	Umarov 36'	Match report (in Uzbek)	Ismoilov 10'	Stadium: Dinamo; Referee: Temurbek Toʻxtasinov

1 May 2022 3	Lokomotiv	2–0	Surxon	Toshkent
	Turopov 45+2'; Maxaradze 86'	Match report (in Uzbek)		Stadium: Lokomotiv; Referee: Akobirxoʻja Shukurullayev

1 May 2022 4	Soʻgʻdiyona	2–0	Metallurg	Jizzax
	Hasanov 29'; Abdumannopov 56'	Match report (in Uzbek)		Stadium: Soʻgʻdiyona; Referee: Aziz Asimov

2 May 2022 5	Paxtakor	0–0	AGMK	Toshkent
		Match report (in Uzbek)		Stadium: Paxtakor; Referee: Firdavs Norsafarov

2 May 2022 6	Kokand 1912	0–1	Nasaf	Fargʻona
		Match report (in Uzbek)	Eshmurodov 87'	Stadium: Uzbekistan; Referee: Rustam Lutfullin

2 May 2022 7	Qizilqum	1–2	Navbahor	Olmaliq
	Komolafe 76'	Match report (in Uzbek)	Ahmedov 33'; Ashurmatov 90+2'	Stadium: OKMK; Referee: Ilgiz Tantashev

=== Round 7 ===
5 May 2022 1	Olimpik	1–1	Dinamo	Toshkent
	Joʻraqoʻziyev 8'	Match report (in Uzbek)	Komilov 3'	Stadium: Paxtakor; Referee: Asker Najafaliyev

5 May 2022 2	Neftchi	0–1	Lokomotiv	Fargʻona
		Match report (in Uzbek)	Etame 58'	Stadium: Uzbekistan; Referee: Shavkat Nasibullayev

6 May 2022 3	Metallurg	1–1	Qizilqum	Olmaliq
	Sattorov 23'	Match report (in Uzbek)	Azimov 90+6'	Stadium: Metallurg

6 May 2022 4	Surxon	1–0	Kokand 1912	Toshkent
	Malikjonov 52'	Match report (in Uzbek)		Stadium: Lokomotiv

6 May 2022 5	Navbahor	2–1	Bunyodkor	Namangan
	Ahmedov 41'; Đokić 64'	Match report (in Uzbek)	Tomiva 83'	Stadium: Navbahor

7 May 2022 6	AGMK	3–2	Soʻgʻdiyona	Olmaliq
	Boakye 45+1'; Gadoyev 72'; Noʻmonov 50' (o.g.)	Match report (in Uzbek)	Jo‘rabekov 27'; Abdumannopov 46'	Stadium: OKMK

7 May 2022 7	Nasaf	0–0	Paxtakor	Qarshi
		Match report (in Uzbek)		Stadium: Qarshi; Referee: Akobirxoʻja Shukurullayev

=== Round 8 ===
10 May 2022 1	Neftchi	0–0	Olimpik	Fargʻona
		Match report (in Uzbek)		Stadium: Uzbekistan

10 May 2022 2	Bunyodkor	1–1	Metallurg	Toshkent
	Rahmonaliyev 17'	Match report (in Uzbek)	Temirov 67'	Stadium: Bunyodkor

11 May 2022 3	Dinamo	0–1	Navbahor	Samarqand
		Match report (in Uzbek)	Ashurmatov 90+4'	Stadium: Dinamo

11 May 2022 4	Lokomotiv	1–2	Kokand 1912	Toshkent
	Muxtorov 52'	Match report (in Uzbek)	Xojimirzayev 19'; Siddiqov 90+4'	Stadium: Lokomotiv

11 May 2022 5	Qizilqum	1–4	AGMK	Olmaliq
	Komolafe 55'	Match report (in Uzbek)	Rahmonov 54'; Boakye; Hagh Nazari 83'; Gʻiyosov 90+9'	Stadium: OKMK; Referee: Shavkat Nasibullayev

12 May 2022 6	Paxtakor	2–2	Surxon	Toshkent
	Sarkic 54', 66'	Match report (in Uzbek)	Hasanov 22'; Qosimov 58'	Stadium: Paxtakor; Referee: Ilgiz Tantashev

12 May 2022 7	Soʻgʻdiyona	1–2	Nasaf	Jizzax
	Norxonov 58'	Match report (in Uzbek)	Bozorov 37', 74'	Stadium: Soʻgʻdiyona; Referee: Elyor Tursunov

=== Round 9 ===
16 May 2022 1	AGMK	0–0	Bunyodkor	Olmaliq
		Match report (in Uzbek)		Stadium: OKMK; Referee: Asker Najafaliyev

16 May 2022 2	Olimpik	0–3	Lokomotiv	Toshkent
		Match report (in Uzbek)	Etame 17', 20'; Turopov 80'	Stadium: Lokomotiv; Referee: Ilgiz Tantashev

17 May 2022 3	Nasaf	5–0	Qizilqum	Qarshi
	Norchayev 17'; Saitov 20'; Bozorov 61'; Aliqulov 80'; Solovyov 90+4'	Match report (in Uzbek)		Stadium: Qarshi; Referee: Rahimbek Karimov

17 May 2022 4	Metallurg	2–1	Dinamo	Bekobod
	Temirov 90+7'; Jumayev 90+4'	Match report (in Uzbek)	Nurmatov 45+2'	Stadium: Metallurg; Referee: Ilgiz Tantashev

17 May 2022 5	Navbahor	0–0	Neftchi	Namangan
		Match report (in Uzbek)		Stadium: Navbahor; Referee: Firdavs Norsafarov

17 May 2022 6	Kokand 1912	1–1	Paxtakor	Fargʻona
	Xolmuhammedov 2' (o.g.); Josović 90+9'	Match report (in Uzbek)	Ćeran 86'	Stadium: Uzbekistan

18 May 2022 7	Surxon	2–4	Soʻgʻdiyona	Toshkent
	Bobojonov 35'; Marković 86' (o.g.)	Match report (in Uzbek)	Halilov 40'; Norxonov 45'; Qahramonov 75', 90'; Kulmatov 90+7'	Stadium: Lokomotiv

=== Round 10 ===
22 May 2022 1	Neftchi	3–0	Metallurg	Fargʻona
	Qoʻziyev 76'; Ismoilov 88'; Hoshimov 90+1'	Match report (in Uzbek)		Stadium: Uzbekistan; Referee: Gʻayrat Joʻrayev

23 May 2022 2	Lokomotiv	0–2	Paxtakor	Toshkent
		Match report (in Uzbek)	Ćeran 28'; Sarkic 48'	Stadium: Lokomotiv; Referee: Rahimbek Karimov

23 May 2022 3	Dinamo	1–2	AGMK	Samarqand
	Komilov 35'	Match report (in Uzbek)	Gʻiyosov 57'; Boakye 87'	Stadium: Dinamo; Referee: Akobirxoʻja Shukurullayev

23 May 2022 4	Qizilqum	2–0	Surxon	Navoiy
	Komolafe 21'; Abduxoliqov 51'	Match report (in Uzbek)		Stadium: Yoshlar; Referee: Temurbek Toʻxtasinov

24 May 2022 5	Soʻgʻdiyona	3–0	Kokand 1912	Jizzax
	Norxonov 53'; Halilov 61'; Abdumannopov 83'	Match report (in Uzbek)		Stadium: Soʻgʻdiyona; Referee: Firdavs Norsafarov

24 May 2022 6	Bunyodkor	1–4	Nasaf	Jizzax
	Tomiva 24'	Match report (in Uzbek)	Muhiddinov 41'; Bozorov 36', 54'; Norchayev 69'	Stadium: Soʻgʻdiyona; Referee: Shavkat Nasibullayev

5 July 2022 7	Olimpik	1–1	Navbahor	Toshkent
	Xoldorxonov 39'	Match report (in Uzbek)	Iskanderov 2'	Stadium: Paxtakor; Referee: Rahimbek Karimov

=== Round 11 ===
27 May 2022 1	Navbahor	3–0	Lokomotiv	Namangan
	Grigalashvili 57'; Marušić 72'	Match report (in Uzbek)		Stadium: Navbahor; Referee: Akobirxoʻja Shukurullayev

27 May 2022 2	AGMK	3–1	Neftchi	Olmaliq
	Toshmatov 12'; Gʻiyosov 70'; Muhsinjon Ubaydullayev 29' (o.g.)	Match report (in Uzbek)	Qoʻziyev 31'	Stadium: OKMK; Referee: Rahimbek Karimov

28 May 2022 3	Kokand 1912	1–3	Qizilqum	Fargʻona
	Siddiqov 82'	Match report (in Uzbek)	Abduxoliqov 29'; Komolafe 52'; Stanisavljević 60'	Stadium: Uzbekistan; Referee: Ilya Ilyin

29 May 2022 4	Surxon	1–0	Bunyodkor	Olmaliq
	Joʻraboyev 27'	Match report (in Uzbek)		Stadium: OKMK; Referee: Firdavs Norsafarov

26 June 2022 5	Metallurg	1–3	Olimpik	Bekobod
		Match report (in Uzbek)		Stadium: Metallurg; Referee: Rahimbek Karimov

6 August 2022 6	Soʻgʻdiyona	2–2	Paxtakor	Jizzax
	Kolaković 45+1'; Norxonov 90+14'	Match report (in Uzbek)	Sobirxoʻjayev 8'; Ćeran 19'	Stadium: Soʻgʻdiyona; Referee: Vadim Agishev

7 August 2022 7	Dinamo	0–4	Nasaf	Samarqand
		Match report (in Uzbek)	Mašović 30'; Norchayev 45'; Saitov 52'; Gʻaybullayev 79'	Stadium: Dinamo; Referee: Temurbek Toʻxtasinov

=== Round 12 ===
12 June 2022 1	Lokomotiv	0–1	Soʻgʻdiyona	Toshkent
		Match report (in Uzbek)	Norxonov 18'	Stadium: Lokomotiv; Referee: Asker Najafaliyev

18 June 2022 2	Dinamo	1–3	Surxon	Samarqand
	Chumak 31'	Match report (in Uzbek)	Akbarov 3'; Yusupov 77'; Qosimov 90+2'	Stadium: Dinamo; Referee: Ahrol Risqullayev

21 June 2022 3	Navbahor	0–0	Metallurg	Namangan
		Match report (in Uzbek)		Stadium: Navbahor; Referee: Ilgiz Tantashev

21 June 2022 4	Bunyodkor	1–1	Kokand 1912	Toshkent
	Ergashev 90+5'	Match report (in Uzbek)	Josović 90'	Stadium: Bunyodkor; Referee: Rahimbek Karimov

22 June 2022 5	Neftchi	1–1	Nasaf	Fargʻona
	Qoʻziyev 26'	Match report (in Uzbek)	Mozgovoy 32'	Stadium: Uzbekistan; Referee: Rustam Lutfullin

22 June 2022 6	Olimpik	1–0	AGMK	Toshkent
	Gʻiyosov 50'	Match report (in Uzbek)		Stadium: Lokomotiv; Referee: Firdavs Norsafarov

23 June 2022 7	Qizilqum	0–2	Paxtakor	Navoiy
		Match report (in Uzbek)	Rashidov 69'; Ćeran 90+2'	Stadium: Yoshlar; Referee: Shavkat Nasibullayev

=== Round 13 ===
28 June 2022 1	Kokand 1912	1–1	Dinamo	Fargʻona
	Hasanov 39'	Match report (in Uzbek)	Komilov 87'	Stadium: Uzbekistan; Referee: Vadim Agishev

29 June 2022 2	Surxon	1–1	Neftchi	Olmaliq
	Qoʻziyev 11'	Match report (in Uzbek)	Qoʻziyev 4' (o.g.)	Stadium: OKMK; Referee: Aziz Asimov

29 June 2022 3	Paxtakor	2–3	Bunyodkor	Toshkent
	Fayzullayev 18'; Sayfiyev 86'	Match report (in Uzbek)	Hakimov 51'; Rahmonaliyev 81', 90+4'	Stadium: Bunyodkor; Referee: Ilgiz Tantashev

30 June 2022 4	Metallurg	1–1	Lokomotiv	Olmaliq
	Temirov 90+9'	Match report (in Uzbek)	Abdurahmonov 90+5'	Stadium: Metallurg; Referee: Shavkat Nasibullayev

30 June 2022 5	Nasaf	2–2	Olimpik	Qarshi
	Muhiddinov 3'; Stanojević 76'	Match report (in Uzbek)	Xoldorxonov 61'; Hamraliyev 71'	Stadium: Qarshi; Referee: Asker Najafaliyev

1 July 2022 6	AGMK	1–2	Navbahor	Olmaliq
	Gadoyev 48'	Match report (in Uzbek)	Iskanderov 11'; Marušić 82'	Stadium: OKMK; Referee: Akobirxo'ja Shukurullayev

5 July 2022 7	Soʻgʻdiyona	0–3	Qizilqum	Jizzax
		Match report (in Uzbek)	Abduxoliqov 14', 18'; Stanisavljević 26'	Stadium: Soʻgʻdiyona; Referee: Asker Najafaliyev

=== Round 14 ===
1 August 2022 1	Surxon	0–5	Olimpik	Olmaliq
		Match report (in Uzbek)	Jiyanov 35', 45'; Joʻraqoʻziyev 61'; Mirsaidov 66'; Odilov 78'	Stadium: OKMK; Referee: Viktor Seraziddinov

1 August 2022 2	Paxtakor	3–2	Dinamo	Toshkent
	Hamdamov 28'; Ćeran 46'; Banaszak 80'	Match report (in Uzbek)	Marat Bikmayev 19', 70'	Stadium: Paxtakor; Referee: Aziz Asimov

1 August 2022 3	Soʻgʻdiyona	2–0	Bunyodkor	Jizzax
	Qahramonov 17'; Oʻlmasaliyev 73' (o.g.)	Match report (in Uzbek)		Stadium: Soʻgʻdiyona; Referee: Rahimbek Karimov

2 August 2022 4	Kokand 1912	3–3	Neftchi	Fargʻona
	Xojimirzayev 55'; Sidorov 57'; Norbekov 87'	Match report (in Uzbek)	Ubaydullayev 10'; Toʻrayev 76'; Abdullajonov 79'	Stadium: Uzbekistan; Referee: Temurbek Toʻxtasinov

2 August 2022 5	Nasaf	0–1	Navbahor	Qarshi
UZT (UTC+5)		Match report (in Uzbek)	Sobirjonov 7'	Stadium: Qarshi; Referee: Vadim Agishev

3 August 2022 6	AGMK	0–1	Metallurg	Olmaliq
UZT (UTC+5)		Match report (in Uzbek)	Temirov 33'	Stadium: OKMK; Referee: Ahrol Risqullayev

3 August 2022 7	Lokomotiv	1–0	Qizilqum	Toshkent
UZT (UTC+5)	Alijonov 83'	Match report (in Uzbek)		Stadium: Lokomotiv; Referee: Abdurashid Xudoyberganov

=== Round 15 ===
10 August 2022 1	AGMK	4–0	Lokomotiv	Olmaliq
UZT (UTC+5)	Hagh Nazari 3'; Ismoilov 13'; Mirahmadov 47', 60'	Match report (in Uzbek)		Stadium: OKMK; Referee: Shavkat Nasibullayev

10 August 2022 2	Bunyodkor	1–2	Qizilqum	Toshkent
UZT (UTC+5)	Hakimov 79'	Match report (in Uzbek)	Abduxoliqov 10', 54'	Stadium: Lokomotiv; Referee: Temurbek Toʻxtasinov

11 August 2022 3	Olimpik	1–1	Kokand 1912	Toshkent
UZT (UTC+5)	Joʻraqoʻziyev 13'	Match report (in Uzbek)	Norbekov 36'	Stadium: Jar; Referee: G'ayrat Jo'rayev

11 August 2022 4	Dinamo	1–2	Soʻgʻdiyona	Samarqand
UZT (UTC+5)	Bikmayev 19'	Match report (in Uzbek)	Qahramonov 25'; Hasanov 87'	Stadium: Dinamo; Referee: G'ayrat Jo'rayev

11 August 2022 5	Navbahor	2–0	Surxon	Namangan
UZT (UTC+5)	Marušić 37'; Yaxshiboyev 78'	Match report (in Uzbek)		Stadium: Navbahor; Referee: Aziz Asimov

12 August 2022 6	Metallurg	0–2	Nasaf	Bekobod
UZT (UTC+5)		Match report (in Uzbek)	Bozorov 37'; Norchayev 86'	Stadium: Metallurg; Referee: Asker Najafaliyev

12 August 2022 7	Navbahor	2–0	Surxon	Namangan
UZT (UTC+5)	Marušić 37'; Yaxshiboyev 78'	Match report (in Uzbek)		Stadium: Navbahor; Referee: Aziz Asimov

=== Round 16 ===
16 August 2022 1	Kokand 1912	1–1	Paxtakor	Fargʻona
UZT (UTC+5)	Norbekov 83'	Match report (in Uzbek)	Golban 41'	Stadium: Uzbekistan; Referee: Ahrol Risqullayev

16 August 2022 2	Lokomotiv	0–0	Bunyodkor	Toshkent
UZT (UTC+5)		Match report (in Uzbek)		Stadium: Lokomotiv; Referee: Asker Najafaliyev

17 August 2022 3	Paxtakor	1–1	Olimpik	Toshkent
UZT (UTC+5)	Banaszak 46'	Match report (in Uzbek)	Joʻraqoʻziyev 61'	Stadium: Jar; Referee: Shavkat Nasibullayev

17 August 2022 4	Nasaf	0–0	AGMK	Qarshi
UZT (UTC+5)		Match report (in Uzbek)		Stadium: Qarshi; Referee: Aziz Asimov

18 August 2022 5	Surxon	1–2	Metallurg	Olmaliq
UZT (UTC+5)	Sanches 90'	Match report (in Uzbek)	Xoltoʻrayev 33'; Farhodov 87'	Stadium: OKMK; Referee: Rahimbek Karimov

18 August 2022 6	Qizilqum	4–1	Dinamo	Navoiy
UZT (UTC+5)	Abduxoliqov 25'; Komolafe 33'; Kenjaboyev 45+1'; Stanisavljević 54'	Match report (in Uzbek)	Yoʻldoshev 61'	Stadium: Yoshlar; Referee: Vadim Agishev

14 September 2022 7	Soʻgʻdiyona	0–0	Neftchi	Jizzax
UZT (UTC+5)		Match report (in Uzbek)		Stadium: Soʻgʻdiyona; Referee: Firdavs Norsafarov

=== Round 17 ===
28 August 2022 1	Navbahor	1–1	Paxtakor	Namangan
UZT (UTC+5)	Iskanderov 47'	Match report (in Uzbek)	Alijonov 52'	Stadium: Navbahor; Referee: Akobirxoʻja Shukurullayev

28 August 2022 2	Dinamo	1–2	Bunyodkor	Samarqand
UZT (UTC+5)	Abdurahmonov 25'	Match report (in Uzbek)	Ismonaliyev 57'; Pobulić 62'	Stadium: Dinamo; Referee: Firdavs Norsafarov

29 August 2022 3	Neftchi	2–1	Qizilqum	Fargʻona
UZT (UTC+5)	Ismoilov 45', 55'	Match report (in Uzbek)	Islom Kenjaboyev 42'	Stadium: Uzbekistan; Referee: Sultonmurod Abdurahmonov

29 August 2022 4	Nasaf	0–0	Lokomotiv	Qarshi
UZT (UTC+5)		Match report (in Uzbek)		Stadium: Qarshi; Referee: Ahrol Risqullayev

29 August 2022 5	AGMK	2–1	Surxon	Olmaliq
UZT (UTC+5)	Jalilov 6'; Boakye 56'	Match report (in Uzbek)	Sanches 60'	Stadium: OKMK; Referee: Temurbek To'xtasinov

29 August 2022 6	Olimpik	1–0	Soʻgʻdiyona	Toshkent
UZT (UTC+5)	Xoldorxonov	Match report (in Uzbek)		Stadium: Jar; Referee: Abdurashid Xudoyberganov

30 August 2022 7	Metallurg	0–0	Kokand 1912	Bekobod
UZT (UTC+5)		Match report (in Uzbek)		Stadium: Metallurg; Referee: Ilgiz Tantashev

=== Round 18 ===
8 September 2022 1	Bunyodkor	1–2	Neftchi	Olmaliq
UZT (UTC+5)	?	Match report (in Uzbek)	Musayev 45+2'; Gʻofurov 55'	Stadium: OKMK; Referee: Aziz Asimov

8 September 2022 2	Qizilqum	2–1	Olimpik	Navoiy
UZT (UTC+5)	Abduxoliqov 33'; Kenjaboyev 49'	Match report (in Uzbek)	Joʻraqoʻziyev 63'	Stadium: Yoshlar; Referee: Akobirxoʻja Shukurullayev

9 September 2022 3	Kokand 1912	0–0	AGMK	Fargʻona
UZT (UTC+5)		Match report (in Uzbek)		Stadium: Uzbekistan; Referee: Rahimbek Karimov

9 September 2022 4	Paxtakor	2–1	Metallurg	Toshkent
UZT (UTC+5)	Banaszak 34'; Fayzullayev 56'	Match report (in Uzbek)	Oʻrinboyev 24'	Stadium: Paxtakor; Referee: Firdavs Norsafarov

10 September 2022 5	Surxon	0–2	Nasaf	Olmaliq
UZT (UTC+5)		Match report (in Uzbek)	Eshmurodov 42'; Norchayev 69'	Stadium: OKMK; Referee: Ilgiz Tantashev

10 September 2022 6	Lokomotiv	1–1	Dinamo	Toshkent
UZT (UTC+5)	Rashidxonov 79'	Match report (in Uzbek)	Bikmayev 34'	Stadium: Lokomotiv; Referee: Doston Mirzaraimov

10 September 2022 7	Soʻgʻdiyona	0–0	Navbahor	Jizzax
UZT (UTC+5)		Match report (in Uzbek)		Stadium: Soʻgʻdiyona; Referee: Vadim Agishev

=== Round 19 ===
15 September 2022 1	AGMK	0–2	Paxtakor	Olmaliq
UZT (UTC+5)		Match report (in Uzbek)	Alijonov 54'; Ćeran 84'	Stadium: OKMK; Referee: Ahrol Risqullayev

15 September 2022 2	Olimpik	1–1	Bunyodkor	Toshkent
UZT (UTC+5)	Hamroaliyev 90'	Match report (in Uzbek)	Narh 45+3'	Stadium: Jar; Referee: Temurbek To'xtasinov

16 September 2022 3	Nasaf	2–1	Kokand 1912	Qarshi
UZT (UTC+5)	Saitov 26'; Aliqulov 90+4'	Match report (in Uzbek)	Norbekov 72'	Stadium: Qarshi; Referee: Ilya Ilyin

16 September 2022 4	Navbahor	1–0	Qizilqum	Namangan
UZT (UTC+5)	Marušić 60'	Match report (in Uzbek)		Stadium: Navbahor; Referee: Abdurashid Xudoyberganov

17 September 2022 5	Surxon	2–1	Lokomotiv	Olmaliq
UZT (UTC+5)	Sanches 18'; Yusupov 40'	Match report (in Uzbek)	Meliyev 21'	Stadium: OKMK; Referee: Aziz Asimov

18 September 2022 6	Metallurg	2–1	Soʻgʻdiyona	Bekobod
UZT (UTC+5)	Abdumannonov 29', 90+6'	Match report (in Uzbek)	Manazarov 45+1'	Stadium: Metallurg; Referee: Asker Najafaliyev

18 September 2022 7	Neftchi	4–1	Dinamo	Fargʻona
UZT (UTC+5)	Hoshimov 13'; Ismoilov 57'; Toʻrayev 65'; Abdullajonov 85'	Match report (in Uzbek)	Grigalashvili 35'	Stadium: Uzbekistan; Referee: Ilgiz Tantashev

=== Round 20 ===
29 September 2022 1	Qizilqum	0–1	Metallurg	Navoiy
UZT (UTC+5)		Match report (in Uzbek)	Oʻrinboyev 51'	Stadium: Yoshlar; Referee: Rahimbek Karimov

30 September 2022 2	Soʻgʻdiyona	0–2	AGMK	Jizzax
UZT (UTC+5)		Match report (in Uzbek)	Boakye 18'; Norxonov 61'	Stadium: Soʻgʻdiyona; Referee: Akobirxoʻja Shukurullayev

1 October 2022 3	Bunyodkor	2–1	Navbahor	Toshkent
UZT (UTC+5)	Ismonaliyev 7'; Hakimov 90'	Match report (in Uzbek)	Yaxshiboyev 42'	Stadium: Jar; Referee: Ilgiz Tantashev

2 October 2022 4	Dinamo	1–1	Olimpik	Samarqand
UZT (UTC+5)	Bikmayev 35'	Match report (in Uzbek)	Jiyanov 45+5'	Stadium: Dinamo; Referee: Ilya Ilyin

2 October 2022 5	Paxtakor	0–1	Nasaf	Toshkent
UZT (UTC+5)		Match report (in Uzbek)	Saitov 27'	Stadium: Paxtakor; Referee: Temurbek To'xtasinov

3 October 2022 6	Kokand 1912	2–3	Surxon	Fargʻona
UZT (UTC+5)	Xolmuhammedov 18'; Norbekov 51'	Match report (in Uzbek)	Toshpo‘latov 74'; Bobojonov 80'; Sanches 89'	Stadium: Uzbekistan; Referee: Firdavs Norsafarov

3 October 2022 7	Lokomotiv	1–3	Neftchi	Toshkent
UZT (UTC+5)	Jumaboyev 90+1'	Match report (in Uzbek)	Abdullayev 35'; Abdullajonov 75'; Qoʻziyev 89'	Stadium: Lokomotiv; Referee: Vadim Agishev

=== Round 21 ===
7 October 2022 1	Metallurg	1–2	Bunyodkor	Bekobod
UZT (UTC+5)	Ibrohimov 35'	Match report (in Uzbek)	Hakimov 41'; Sultonov 77'	Stadium: Metallurg; Referee: G'ayrat Jo'rayev

8 October 2022 2	Kokand 1912	0–0	Lokomotiv	Fargʻona
UZT (UTC+5)		Match report (in Uzbek)		Stadium: Uzbekistan; Referee: Akobirxo'ja Shukurullayev

8 October 2022 3	Olimpik	1–1	Neftchi	Toshkent
UZT (UTC+5)	Joʻraqoʻziyev 17'	Match report (in Uzbek)	Abdullayev 2'	Stadium: Jar; Referee: Akmal Rahimov

8 October 2022 4	AGMK	0–1	Qizilqum	Olmaliq
UZT (UTC+5)		Match report (in Uzbek)	Tolmasov 9'	Stadium: OKMK; Referee: Aziz Asimov

9 October 2022 5	Surxon	1–1	Paxtakor	Toshkent
UZT (UTC+5)	Sanches 2'	Match report (in Uzbek)	Fayzullayev 31'	Stadium: Paxtakor; Referee: Akmal Rahimov

9 October 2022 6	Navbahor	2–0	Dinamo	Namangan
UZT (UTC+5)	Ciger 18'; Iskanderov 34'	Match report (in Uzbek)		Stadium: Navbahor; Referee: Akmal Rahimov

9 October 2022 7	Nasaf	1–1	Soʻgʻdiyona	Qarshi
UZT (UTC+5)	Lima 50'	Match report (in Uzbek)	Qahramonov 81'	Stadium: Qarshi; Referee: Ilgiz Tantashev

=== Round 22 ===
17 October 2022 1	Metallurg	0–1	Dinamo	Samarqand
UZT (UTC+5)		Match report (in Uzbek)	Abdumannonov 18'	Stadium: Dinamo; Referee: Rustam Lutfullin

17 October 2022 2	Lokomotiv	1–2	Olimpik	Toshkent
UZT (UTC+5)	Etame 4'	Match report (in Uzbek)	Joʻraqoʻziyev 64'; Mamasiddiqov 75'	Stadium: Lokomotiv; Referee: Firdavs Norsafarov

18 October 2022 3	Neftchi	1–2	Navbahor	Fargʻona
UZT (UTC+5)	Musayev 4'	Match report (in Uzbek)	Iskanderov 29'; Marušić 64'	Stadium: Istiqlol; Referee: Temurbek To'xtasinov

18 October 2022 4	Paxtakor	5–2	Kokand 1912	Toshkent
UZT (UTC+5)	Ćeran 35', 39', 50', 78'; Sobirxoʻjayev 59'	Match report (in Uzbek)	Sidiqov 29'; Rustamov 45+2'	Stadium: Paxtakor; Referee: Ravshan Abduvohidov

18 October 2022 5	Soʻgʻdiyona	0–1	Surxon	Jizzax
UZT (UTC+5)		Match report (in Uzbek)	Saydazimov 6'	Stadium: Soʻgʻdiyona; Referee: Rahimbek Karimov

19 October 2022 6	Qizilqum	1–2	Nasaf	Navoiy
UZT (UTC+5)	Joʻrayev 78'	Match report (in Uzbek)	Saitov 60'; Lima 90+3'	Stadium: Yoshlar; Referee: Akobirxoʻja Shukurullayev

19 October 2022 7	Bunyodkor	0–1	AGMK	Toshkent
UZT (UTC+5)		Match report (in Uzbek)	Papava 7'	Stadium: Jar; Referee: Akobirxoʻja Shukurullayev

=== Round 23 ===
24 October 2022 1	Paxtakor	2–0	Lokomotiv	Toshkent
UZT (UTC+5)	Ćeran 26'; Fayzullayev 38'	Match report (in Uzbek)		Stadium: Paxtakor; Referee: Rustam Lutfullin

24 October 2022 2	Surxon	2–0	Qizilqum	Olmaliq
UZT (UTC+5)	Sanches 61'; Abdullayev 62'	Match report (in Uzbek)		Stadium: OKMK; Referee: Aziz Asimov

25 October 2022 3	Nasaf	1–1	Bunyodkor	Qarshi
UZT (UTC+5)	Norchayev 47'	Match report (in Uzbek)	Hakimov 23'	Stadium: Qarshi; Referee: Temurbek Toʻxtasinov

25 October 2022 4	Metallurg	1–0	Neftchi	Bekobod
UZT (UTC+5)	Abdumannonov 44'	Match report (in Uzbek)		Stadium: Metallurg; Referee: Shavkat Nasibullayev

25 October 2022 5	Navbahor	1–1	Olimpik	Namangan
UZT (UTC+5)	Iskanderov 86'	Match report (in Uzbek)	Hamroliyev 42'	Stadium: Navbahor; Referee: Ahrol Risqullayev

26 October 2022 6	AGMK	4–0	Dinamo	Olmaliq
UZT (UTC+5)	Nazari 12'; Boakye 20'; Ismoilov 30'; Jalilov 61'	Match report (in Uzbek)		Stadium: OKMK; Referee: Rahimbek Karimov

26 October 2022 7	Kokand 1912	2–1	Soʻgʻdiyona	Fargʻona
UZT (UTC+5)	Norbekov 63'; Toshmirzayev 90+5'	Match report (in Uzbek)	Gʻofurov 76'	Stadium: Uzbekistan; Referee: Abdurashid Xudoyberganov

=== Round 24 ===
2 November 2022 1	Paxtakor	2–0	Soʻgʻdiyona	Toshkent
UZT (UTC+5)	Hamdamov 5'; Alijonov 48'	Match report (in Uzbek)		Stadium: Paxtakor; Referee: Temurbek Toʻxtasinov

2 November 2022 2	Olimpik	2–1	Metallurg	Toshkent
UZT (UTC+5)	Jiyanov 45+1'; Abdumannonov 45+1'	Match report (in Uzbek)	Abdumannonov 89'	Stadium: Jar; Referee: Viktor Serazitdinov

2 November 2022 3	Qizilqum	1–1	Kokand 1912	Navoiy
UZT (UTC+5)	Abduxoliqov 61'	Match report (in Uzbek)	Vahobov 48'	Stadium: Yoshlar; Referee: Firdavs Norsafarov

2 November 2022 4	Nasaf	1–0	Dinamo	Qarshi
UZT (UTC+5)	Solovyov 4'	Match report (in Uzbek)		Stadium: Qarshi; Referee: Shavkat Nasibullayev

2 November 2022 5	Neftchi	1–3	AGMK	Fargʻona
UZT (UTC+5)	Larin 10'	Match report (in Uzbek)	Boakye 64', 85'; Begimov 90+3'	Stadium: Istiqlol; Referee: Abdurashid Xudoyberganov

3 November 2022 6	Lokomotiv	0–2	Navbahor	Toshkent
UZT (UTC+5)		Match report (in Uzbek)	Marušić 64', 76'	Stadium: Lokomotiv; Referee: Rahimbek Karimov

3 November 2022 7	Bunyodkor	2–1	Surxon	Toshkent
UZT (UTC+5)	Ismonaliyev 12'; Ikromov 70'	Match report (in Uzbek)	Sanches 76'	Stadium: Jar; Referee: Akobirxoʻja Shukurullayev

=== Round 25 ===
7 November 2022 1	Surxon	1–4	Dinamo	Toshkent
UZT (UTC+5)	Sanches 88'	Match report (in Uzbek)	Isroilov 20'; Bikmayev 28', 40', 57'	Stadium: Jar; Referee: Vadim Agishev

7 November 2022 2	AGMK	6–0	Olimpik	Olmaliq
UZT (UTC+5)	Boakye 21', 57'; Gʻiyosov 28'; Tursunov 60'; Gadoyev 74'; Mirahmadov 90'	Match report (in Uzbek)		Stadium: OKMK; Referee: Asker Najafaliyev

7 November 2022 3	Soʻgʻdiyona	2–2	Lokomotiv	Jizzax
UZT (UTC+5)	Norxonov 6'; Hasanov 21'	Match report (in Uzbek)	Etame 2'; Jumaboyev 40'	Stadium: Soʻgʻdiyona; Referee: Ahrol Risqullayev

7 November 2022 4	Kokand 1912	0–1	Bunyodkor	Fargʻona
UZT (UTC+5)		Match report (in Uzbek)	Rahmonaliyev 81'	Stadium: Uzbekistan; Referee: Aziz Asimov

7 November 2022 5	Metallurg	0–1	Navbahor	Bekobod
UZT (UTC+5)		Match report (in Uzbek)	Marušić 60'	Stadium: Metallurg; Referee: Firdavs Norsafarov

7 November 2022 6	Nasaf	0–1	Neftchi	Qarshi
UZT (UTC+5)		Match report (in Uzbek)	Abdullayev 61'	Stadium: Qarshi; Referee: Rahimbek Karimov

7 November 2022 7	Paxtakor	6–0	Qizilqum	Toshkent
UZT (UTC+5)	Ćeran 3', 20', 53', 63', 69'; Hamdamov 60'	Match report (in Uzbek)		Stadium: Paxtakor; Referee: Akobirxoʻja Shukurullayev

=== Round 26 ===
12 November 2022 1	Bunyodkor	0–2	Paxtakor	Toshkent
UZT (UTC+5)		Match report (in Uzbek)	Ćeran 14'; Turgʻunboyev 16'	Stadium: Jar; Referee: Ahrol Risqullayev

12 November 2022 2	Olimpik	0–2	Nasaf	Toshkent
UZT (UTC+5)	Joʻraqoʻziyev 24', 71'	Match report (in Uzbek)		Stadium: Paxtakor; Referee: Akobirxoʻja Shukurullayev

12 November 2022 3	Qizilqum	2–1	Soʻgʻdiyona	Navoiy
UZT (UTC+5)	Abduxoliqov 62'; Joʻrayev 80'	Match report (in Uzbek)	Norxonov 50'	Stadium: Yoshlar; Referee: Husan Muzaffarov

12 November 2022 4	Dinamo	2–0	Kokand 1912	Samarqand
UZT (UTC+5)	Grigalashvili 34'; Sharipov 77'	Match report (in Uzbek)		Stadium: Dinamo; Referee: Temurbek Toʻxtasinov

12 November 2022 5	Lokomotiv	3–1	Metallurg	Toshkent
UZT (UTC+5)	Rashidxonov 34'; Muxtorov 64'; Qodirqulov 68'	Match report (in Uzbek)	Oʻrinboyev 46'	Stadium: Lokomotiv; Referee: Rustam Lutfullin

12 November 2022 6	Neftchi	3–0	Surxon	Fargʻona
UZT (UTC+5)	Ubaydullayev 15'; Toʻrayev 52'; Abdullayev 77'	Match report (in Uzbek)		Stadium: Istiqlol; Referee: Ibrohim Ismoilov

12 November 2022 7	Navbahor	3–1	AGMK	Namangan
UZT (UTC+5)	Iskanderov 11'; Abdumannopov 53'; Đokić 77'	Match report (in Uzbek)	Mirahmadov 82'	Stadium: Navbahor; Referee: Vadim Agishev

== Results ==
=== Results table ===
Home \ Away	AGM	BUN	DIN	KOK	LOK	MET	NAS	NAV	NEF	OLY	PAK	QIZ	SOG	SUR
AGMK	—	0–0	4–0	3–0	4–0	0–1	2–2	1–2	3–1	6–0	0–2	0–1	3–2	2–1
Bunyodkor	0–1	—	2–1	1–1	2–1	1–1	1–4	2–1	1–2	1–5	0–2	1–2	0–0	2–1
Dinamo	1–2	1–2	—	2–0	3–1	0–1	0–4	0–1	1–1	1–1	0–2	0–0	1–2	1–3
Kokand	0–0	0–1	1–1	—	0–0	1–0	0–1	1–1	3–3	1–0	1–1	1–3	2–1	2–3
Lokomotiv	2–1	0–0	1–1	1–2	—	3–1	0–1	0–2	1–3	1–2	0–2	1–0	0–1	2–0
Metallurg	1–0	1–2	2–1	0–0	1–1	—	0–2	0–1	1–0	0–0	0–2	1–1	2–1	0–0
Nasaf	0–0	1–1	1–0	2–1	0–0	1–1	—	0–1	0–1	2–2	0–0	5–0	1–1	2–0
Navbahor	3–1	2–1	2–0	2–0	2–0	0–0	0–0	—	0–0	1–1	1–1	1–0	1–2	2–0
Neftchi	1–3	1–3	4–1	1–0	0–1	3–0	1–1	1–2	—	0–0	0–2	2–1	1–2	3–0
Olympic	1–0	1–1	1–1	1–1	0–3	2–1	2–0	1–1	1–1	—	1–1	0–1	1–0	0–0
Pakhtakor	0–0	2–3	3–2	5–2	2–0	2–1	0–1	1–0	1–0	1–1	—	6–0	2–0	2–2
Qizilqum	1–4	3–1	4–1	1–1	2–0	0–1	1–2	1–2	3–0	2–1	0–2	—	2–1	2–0
Sogdiana	0–2	2–0	1–0	3–0	2–2	2–0	1–2	0–0	0–0	1–1	2–2	0–3	—	0–1
Surkhon	1–2	1–0	1–4	1–0	2–1	1–2	0–2	1–2	1–1	0–5	1–1	2–0	2–4	—

Updated to match(es) played on 12 November 2022. Source: Uzbekistan Professional Football League
Legend: Blue = home team win; Yellow = draw; Red = away team win.

=== Results by match played ===
Team ╲ Round	1	2	3	4	5	6	7	8	9	10	11	12	13	14	15	16	17	18	19	20	21	22	23	24	25	26
AGMK	L	L	D	W	W	D	W	W	D	W	W	L	L	L	W	D	W	D	L	W	L	W	W	W	W	L
Bunyodkor	D	L	W	W	W	L	L	D	D	L	L	D	W	L	L	D	W	L	D	W	W	L	D	W	W	L
Dinamo	L	L	D	L	W	D	D	L	L	L	P	L	D	L	L	L	L	D	L	D	L	L	L	L	W	W
Kokand	L	W	L	W	L	L	L	W	D	L	L	D	D	D	D	D	D	D	L	L	D	L	W	D	L	L
Lokomotiv	L	W	L	L	L	W	W	L	W	L	L	L	D	W	L	D	D	D	L	L	D	L	L	L	D	W
Metallurg	W	D	D	L	L	L	D	D	W	L	D	D	D	W	L	W	D	L	W	W	L	W	W	L	L	L
Nasaf	D	D	D	W	W	W	D	W	W	W	P	D	D	L	W	D	D	W	W	W	D	W	D	W	L	L
Navbahor	D	W	W	L	L	W	W	W	D	D	W	D	W	W	W	D	D	D	W	L	W	W	D	W	W	W
Neftchi	W	L	L	L	L	D	L	D	D	W	L	D	D	D	L	D	W	W	W	W	D	L	L	L	W	W
Olympic	D	L	D	D	L	W	D	D	L	D	D	W	D	W	D	D	W	L	D	D	D	W	D	W	L	W
Pakhtakor	W	W	D	W	W	D	D	D	D	W	P	W	L	W	W	D	D	W	W	L	D	W	W	W	W	W
Qizilqum	W	W	D	W	W	L	D	L	L	W	W	L	W	L	W	W	L	W	L	L	W	L	L	D	L	W
Sogdiana	D	W	W	D	W	W	L	L	W	W	P	W	L	W	W	D	L	D	L	L	D	L	L	L	D	L
Surkhon	D	L	D	L	L	L	W	D	L	L	W	W	D	L	L	L	L	L	W	W	D	W	W	L	L	L

Updated to match(es) played on 12 November 2022. Source: Championat.asia
W = Win; D = Draw; L = Loss; P = Postponed

=== Positions by round ===
Team ╲ Round	1	2	3	4	5	6	7	8	9	10	11	12	13	14	15	16	17	18	19	20	21	22	23	24	25	26
AGMK	11	13	14	11	6	7	5	5	4	3															4	4
Bunyodkor	8	12	6	5	3	4	6	7	8	8															7	8
Dinamo Samarqand	14	14	13	14	10	12	11	12	12	13												14	14	14	14	14
Kokand 1912	12	7	9	6	7	10	10	9	10	9															12	13
Lokomotiv Tashkent	13	8	8	10	12	9	8	8	7	7															13	12
Metallurg Bekabad	4	3	5	7	9	11	12	11	9	10															9	10
Nasaf Qarshi	7	9	10	8	8	6	7	6	3	2														1	3	3
Navbahor Namangan	6	4	3	4	5	5	3	1	2	4														3	2	2
Neftchi Fergana	3	6	7	12	13	13	14	14	14	11															10	9
Olympic Tashkent	9	11	11	9	11	8	9	10	11	12															8	6
Pakhtakor Tashkent	2	2	2	2	4	3	4	4	5	4														2	1	1
Qizilqum Zarafshon	1	1	1	1	1	2	1	2	6	6															5	5
Sogdiana Jizzakh	10	5	4	3	2	1	2	3	1	1															6	7
Surkhon Termez	5	10	11	13	14	14	13	13	13	14															11	11

Leader and qualification to AFC Champions League group stage
Qualification to AFC Champions League group stage
Qualification to the AFC Champions League preliminary round
Relegation to Uzbekistan Pro League#Relegation play off
Relegation to Uzbekistan Pro League

Updated to match(es) played on 7 November 2022. Source: Uzbekistan Professional Football League

=== 2022 U19 Championship under Super League results ===
Uzbekistan U19 Championship
- Season: 2022
- Champions: Navbahor U19
- Matches: 255
- Goals: 922 (3.62 per match)
- Top goalscorer: Bobur Abdurahmonov (16)
- Biggest home win: Navbahor U19 8:0 Kokand 1912 U19 (14 September 2022)
- Biggest away win: Zomin U19 4:6 Andijon U19 (20 October 2022)
- Highest scoring: Zomin U19 4:6 Andijon U19 (20 October 2022)
- Highest attendance: 205 (9 June 2022, Qizilqum U19 2:0 Metallurg U19)
- Lowest attendance: 12 (11 April 2022, Olimpik U19 4:0 Xorazm U19)

The third season of the tournament kicked off on 5 April. This season, players born in 2004 and later were registered.

#	Team	Game	Win	Draw	Loss	Goals ratio	Points
1	Paxtakor U19	22	13	5	4	62-24	44
2	Navbahor U19	22	15	8	3	33-15	53
3	Nasaf U19	26	13	10	3	37-16	49
4	OKMK U19	22	13	5	8	44-23	44
5	Qizilqum U19	22	12	3	11	34-36	39
6	Olimpik U19	22	7	14	5	31-28	35
7	Soʻgʻdiyona U19	22	9	7	10	31-31	34
8	Bunyodkor U19	22	9	7	10	29-37	34
9	Neftchi U19	22	8	8	10	31-32	32
10	Metallurg U19	22	8	8	10	19-27	32
11	Surxon U19	22	7	5	14	25-44	26
12	Lokomotiv U19	22	6	6	14	22-36	24
13	Qoʻqon 1912 U19	22	4	10	12	21-38	22
14	Dinamo U19	22	3	6	17	24-47	15

=== 2022 U21 Championship under Super League results ===
Uzbekistan U21 Championship
- Season: 2022
- Champions: Olimpik
- Matches: 182
- Goals: 769 (4.23 per match)
- Top goalscorer: Boburbek Sobirov (17)
- Biggest home win: Olimpik U21 6:1 Dinamo U21 (6 May 2022)
- Biggest away win: Metallurg U21 1:7 Olimpik U21 (27 June 2022)
- Highest scoring: Kokand 1912 U21 4:7 Neftchi U21 (3 August 2022)
- Highest attendance: 447 (4 March 2022, Navbahor U21 2:3 Nasaf U21)

#	Club	Games	Wins	Draws	Losses	Goals ratio	Points
1	Olimpik U21	26	22	0	4	86-27	66
2	Lokomotiv U21	26	17	4	5	60-29	55
3	Paxtakor U21	26	16	1	9	53-34	49
4	Metallurg U21	26	14	4	8	53-47	46
5	Nasaf U21	26	14	3	9	55-37	45
6	AGMK U21	26	13	4	9	56-44	43
7	Bunyodkor U21	26	13	2	11	47-45	41
8	Neftchi U21	26	10	4	12	44-60	34
9	Navbahor U21	26	9	5	12	57-55	32
10	Surxon U21	26	9	4	13	41-57	31
11	Dinamo U21	26	7	5	14	47-62	26
12	Qizilqum U21	26	6	7	13	38-55	25
13	Kokand 1912 U21	26	5	5	16	38-70	20
14	Soʻgʻdiyona U21	26	2	2	22	25-78	8

== Relegation play-offs ==
The relegation play-offs took place on 25 November 2022.

=== Matches ===
25 November 2022
15:00

Turon Yaypan	2–1	Lokomotiv Tashkent
Murtozoev 12' S.Abdunabiev 76'		Kodirkulov 37'

Uzbekistan Stadium, Yaypan
Attendance: 3,500
Referee: Asker Najafaliev

Turon won 2–1 on aggregate, and promotion to 2023 Super League.

== Season Statistics ==
- First goal of the season: Shakhzod Ubaydullaev for Neftchi Fergana against Kokand 1912 (2 March 2022)

=== Goalscorers ===
As of match played 12 November 2022

Rank	Player	Club	Goals
1	(Serbia) Dragan Ćeran	Pakhtakor Tashkent	20
2	(Uzbekistan) Temurkhuja Abdukholiqov	Qizilqum Zarafshon	13
3	(Italy) Martin Boakye	AGMK	12
4	(Serbia) Zoran Marušić	Navbahor Namangan	11
5	(Uzbekistan) Otabek Jurakuziyev	Olympic	10
5	(Uzbekistan) Shokhruz Norkhonov	Sogdiana Jizzakh	10
7	(Uzbekistan) Khusayin Norchaev	Nasaf	9
8	(Spain) Rubén Sánchez	Surkhon Termez	8
8	(Uzbekistan) Marat Bikmoev	Dinamo Samarqand	8
10	(Uzbekistan) Shokhnazar Norbekov	Kokand 1912	7
10	(Uzbekistan) Khursid Giyosov	AGMK	7
10	(Uzbekistan) Jamshid Iskanderov	Navbahor Namangan	7
10	(Uzbekistan) Umarali Rakhmonaliev	Bunyodkor	7

== Attendances ==
=== By round ===
As of match played 12 November 2022

2022 Uzbekistan Super League Attendance
Round	Total	GP.	Avg. Per Game
Round 1	43,483	7	6,212
Round 2	18,176	7	2,597
Round 3	23,558	7	3,365
Round 4	29,694	7	4,242
Round 5	18,416	7	2,631
Round 6	14,567	7	2,081
Round 7	53,544	7	7,649
Round 8	17,336	7	2,477
Round 9	38,899	7	5,557
Round 10	29,615	7	4,231
Round 11	31,273	7	4,468
Round 12	22,613	7	3,230
Round 13	18,562	7	2,652
Round 14	20,953	7	2,993
Round 15	28,271	7	4,039
Round 16	22,936	7	3,277
Round 17	34,936	7	4,991
Round 18	15,155	7	2,165
Round 19	25,643	7	3,663
Round 20	26,023	7	3,718
Round 21	26,539	7	3,791
Round 22	23,214	7	3,316
Round 23	16,973	7	2,425
Round 24	11,415	7	1,631
Round 25	10,209	7	1,458
Round 26	37,261	7	5,323
Total	659,264	182	3,622

=== By team ===
Pos	Team	Total	High	Low	Average	Change
1	AGMK	11,516	4,675	2,452	3,839	n/a
2	Bunyodkor	7,330	2,400	864	1,466	n/a
3	Dinamo	26,998	10,985	1,558	5,400	n/a
4	Kokand	12,287	5,702	1,240	3,072	n/a
5	Lokomotiv	3,439	1,105	681	860	n/a
6	Metallurg	17,037	5,200	3,125	4,259	n/a
7	Nasaf	29,049	15,500	5,203	9,683	n/a
8	Navbahor	80,661	26,231	4,520	16,132	n/a
9	Neftchi	9,241	5,250	861	1,848	n/a
10	Olympic	3,786	1,250	383	757	n/a
11	Pakhtakor	20,557	12,767	1,122	5,139	n/a
12	Qizilqum	3,973	1,430	375	795	n/a
13	Sogdiana	16,737	11,651	1,003	5,579	n/a
14	Surkhon	2,930	1,297	320	733	n/a
	League total	245,541	26,231	320	3,720	n/a

Updated to games played on 24 May 2022

== Awards ==
=== Monthly awards ===
Month	Manager of the Month		Player of the Month		Goal of the Month	
Month	Manager	Club	Player	Club	Player	Club
March	(Serbia) Nikola Lazarevic	Qizilqum Zarafshon	(Serbia) Dragan Ćeran	Pakhtakor	(Uzbekistan) Javokhir Sidikov	Kokand 1912
April	(Uzbekistan) Mirjalol Qosimov	AGMK	(Uzbekistan) Ignatiy Nesterov	Qizilqum Zarafshon	(Uzbekistan) Doniyor Abdumannopov	Sogdiana Jizzakh

== See also ==
- 2022 Uzbekistan Pro League
- 2022 Uzbekistan First League
- 2022 Uzbekistan Cup
