= 2023 Uzbekistan Pro League =

Uzbekistan Pro League
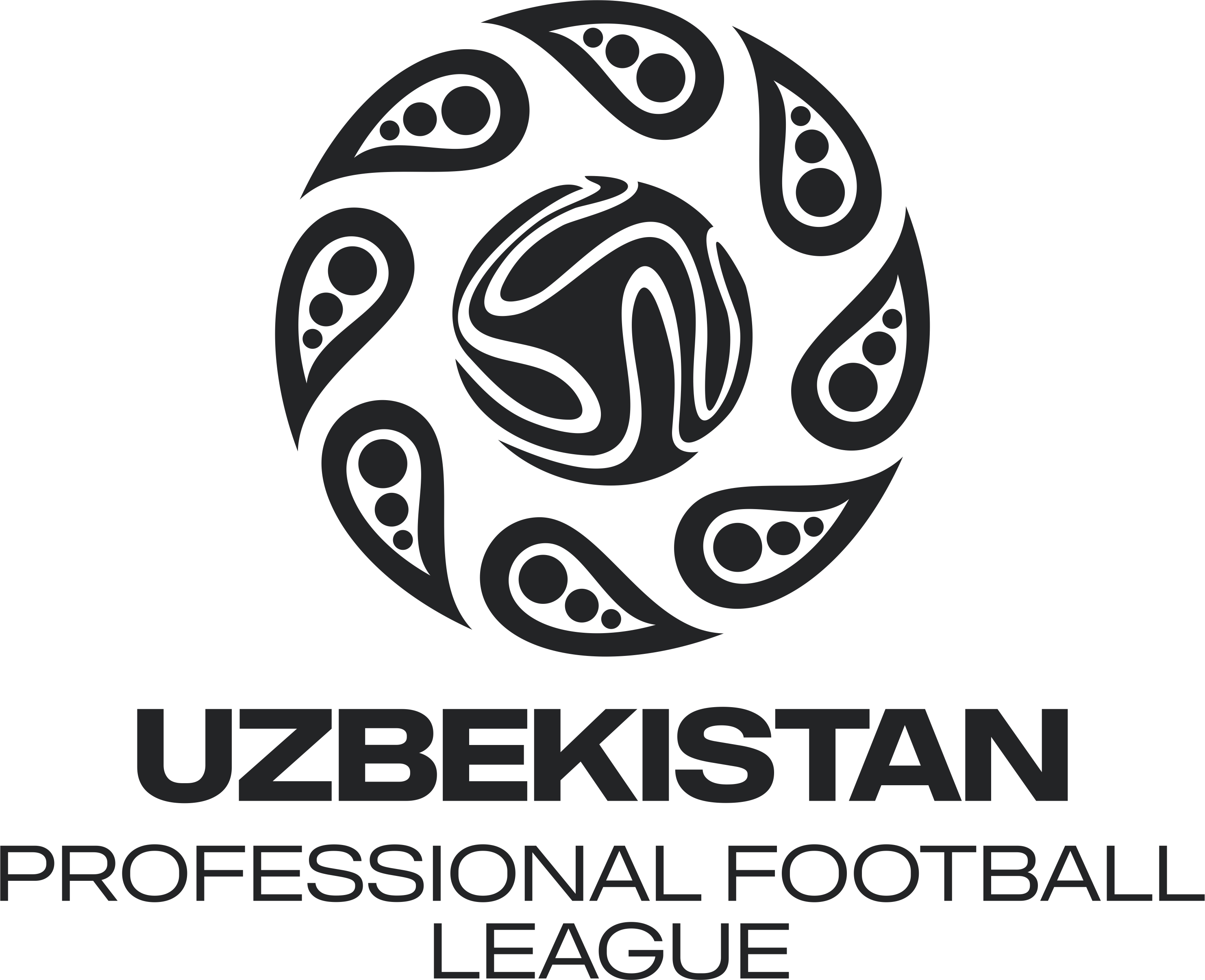
- Logo
- Season: 2023
- Champions: Lokomotiv Tashkent
- Promoted: Lokomotiv Tashkent; Dinamo Samarqand
- Relegated: G'ijduvon; Andijon-SGS
- Matches: 110
- Goals: 295 (2.68 per match)
- Top goalscorer: Anvarjon Hojimirzayev (16)
- Biggest home win: Lokomotiv Tashkent 6–1 Andijon-SGS (13 August 2023)
- Biggest away win: G'ijduvon 1–8 Kokand 1912 (25 October 2023)
- Highest scoring: G'ijduvon 1–8 Kokand 1912 (25 October 2023)
- Longest winning run: Kokand 1912 (6)
- Longest unbeaten run: Dinamo Samarqand (19)
- Longest winless run: Andijon-SGS (11)
- Longest losing run: PFC Navbahor Namangan-2 (6)
- Highest attendance: 6,800 - Dinamo vs Lokomotiv (4 September 2023)
- Lowest attendance: 89 - G'ijduvon vs Andijon-SGS (18 April 2023)
- Average attendance: 980 (25 October 2023)
- All statistics correct as of 25 October 2023.

The 2023 Uzbekistan Pro League (Uzbek: Futbol boʻyicha 2023-yilgi Oʻzbekiston Pro ligasi) was the 32nd since its establishment in 1992. The competition started on 15 March 2023 and end on 25 October 2023.

== Teams ==
Club	Coach	Location	Stadium	Capacity	Kit sponsor	Shirt sponsor
Andijon-SGS	(Uzbekistan) Shohruh Ishanov	Andijan	Uzbekistan Stadium	8,000	Nike	Shirin Gas Service
Aral	(Uzbekistan) Nigmatulla Kutibayev	Nukus	Turon Stadium	9,300	Adidas	Uzkimyo Sanoat
Dinamo Samarqand	(Uzbekistan) Vadim Abramov	Samarkand	Dinamo Samarkand Stadium	13,800	Jako	Agromir Buildings
G'ijduvon	(Uzbekistan) Gennadiy Kochnev	Gʻijduvon	Central Stadium	5,000	Jako	Olcha.uz
Kokand 1912	(Uzbekistan) Davron Fayziev	Kokand	Central Stadium	10,500	Jako	
Lokomotiv Tashkent	(Uzbekistan) Denis Korostichenko	Tashkent	Lokomotiv Stadium	8,500	Jako	Uzbek Railways
Mash'al Mubarek	(Uzbekistan) Dilyaver Vaniyev	Muborak	Bahrom Vafoev Stadium	10,000	Macron	National Bank of Uzbekistan
Navbahor Namangan-2	(Uzbekistan) Rashid Gafurov	Namangan	Markaziy Stadium	21,913	Adidas	Art Soft Cluster
Shurtan Guzar	(Uzbekistan) Aleksey Yevstafeyev	Gʻuzor	G'uzor Stadium	7,000	Kelme	HGT
UniRed Samarqand	(Uzbekistan) Alisher Latipov	Samarkand	Dinamo Samarkand Stadium	13,800	Joma	SXS Kamalak Service
Xorazm Urganch	(Uzbekistan) Ruslan Akhmedov	Xorazm	Xorazm Stadium	13,500	Jako	Uztelecom

== Foreign players ==
The number of foreign players is restricted to five per UPL team. A team can use only five foreign players on the field in each game.

Club	Player 1	Player 2	Player 3	Player 4	Player 5	AFC players	Former players
Andijon-SGS							
Aral							
Dinamo Samarqand	(Serbia) Dusan Mijic	(Ghana) Derrick Mensah	(Ghana) Francis Narh	(Japan) Yudai Koike		(Kyrgyzstan) **Joel Kojo**	(Georgia (country)) **Elgujja Grigalashvili** (Russia) Yevgeni Nazarov
G'ijduvon	(Nigeria) Sunday Song						
Kokand 1912							
Lokomotiv Tashkent	(Croatia) Šime Žužul	(Russia) Ivan Solovyov	(North Macedonia) **Bojan Najdenov**	(Nigeria) Samuel Opeh	(Tajikistan) **Manuchekhr Safarov**	(Tajikistan) **Rustam Soirov**	
Mash'al Mubarek	(Georgia (country)) Andro Giorgadze	(Georgia (country)) Shota Gvazava	(Georgia (country)) Otar Javashvili	(Ukraine) Serhiy Petrov			
Navbahor Namangan-2							
Shurtan Guzar							
UniRed Samarqand							
Xorazm Urganch	(Cameroon) Neville Tengeg						

In bold: Players that have been capped for their national team.

== League table ==
Pos	Team	Pld	W	D	L	GF	GA	GD	Pts	
1	Lokomotiv Tashkent	20	15	3	2	40	11	+29	48	Promotion to Uzbekistan Super League
2	Dinamo Samarqand	20	11	8	1	35	11	+24	41	Promotion to Uzbekistan Super League
3	Kokand 1912	20	11	7	2	43	22	+21	40	Qualification for Super League play-off
4	Mash'al Mubarek	20	10	4	6	26	20	+6	34	
5	Shurtan Guzar	20	7	5	8	29	25	+4	26	
6	Aral	20	6	8	6	18	15	+3	26	
7	Xorazm Urganch	20	5	7	8	16	19	−3	22	
8	UniRed Samarqand	20	4	6	10	24	34	−10	18	
9	Navbahor Namangan-2	20	5	3	12	21	32	−11	18	
10	G'ijduvon	20	4	4	12	21	52	−31	16	Relegation to Uzbekistan First League
11	Andijon-SGS	20	3	3	14	22	54	−32	12	Relegation to Uzbekistan First League

Updated to match(es) played on 25 October 2023. Source: Uzbekistan Professional Football League
Rules for classification: 1) points; 2) head-to-head points; 3) head-to-head goal difference; 4) head-to-head away goals scored; 5) goal difference; 6) number of goals scored.

=== 1 ===
15 March 2023 1	Shoʻrtan	3–3	Kokand 1912	Gʻuzor
UZT (UTC+5)	Sarimsoqov 53'; Polvonov 77'; Nuriddinov 84'	Match report	Ismoilov 12'; Qosimov 42'; Xojimirzayev 52'	Stadium: Gʻuzor; Attendance: 831

15 March 2023 2	Unired	1–0	Xorazm	Samarqand
UZT (UTC+5)	Mamatov 57'	Match report		Stadium: Dinamo; Attendance: 3309

16 March 2023 3	Mashʼal	1–3	Dinamo	Muborak
UZT (UTC+5)	Giorgadze 84'	Match report	Kojo 57', 62'; Grigalashvili 64'	Stadium: Bahrom Vafoyev; Attendance: 924

16 March 2023 4	Navbahor Farm	0–0	Aral	Namangan
UZT (UTC+5)		Match report		Stadium: Navbahor; Attendance: 1252

16 March 2023 5	Andijon SGS	0–4	Lokomotiv	Yaypan
UZT (UTC+5)		Match report	Moʻminov 35'; Zuzul 45', 53'; Soirov 90+4'	Stadium: Oʻzbekiston; Attendance: 215

=== 2 ===
22 March 2023 1	Kokand 1912	1–0	Mashʼal	Kokand
UZT (UTC+5)	Shixov 68'	Match report		Stadium: Kokand; Attendance: 2541

22 March 2023 2	Gʻijduvon	1–2	Shoʻrtan	Samarqand
UZT (UTC+5)	Qurbonov 76'	Match report	Suvonov 13'; Samariddinov 89'	Stadium: Dinamo; Attendance: 1853

22 March 2023 3	Mashʼal	1–3	Dinamo	Muborak
UZT (UTC+5)	Giorgadze 84'	Match report	Kojo 57', 62'; Grigalashvili 64'	Stadium: Bahrom Vafoyev; Attendance: 952

23 March 2023 4	Aral	3–2	Andijon SGS	Nukus
UZT (UTC+5)	Joʻraqulov 66'; Qutiboyev 77'; Qalmagambetov 88'	Match report	Rejabboyev 6'; Moʻydinov 83'	Stadium: QRNKS; Attendance: 1243

23 March 2023 5	Dinamo	1–0	Unired	Samarqand
UZT (UTC+5)	Sharofutdinov 35'	Match report		Stadium: Dinamo; Attendance: 3246

=== 3 ===
28 March 2023 1	Andijon-SGS	2–1	Xorazm	Yaypan
UZT (UTC+5)	Jumaboyev 33'; Moʻydinov 86'	Match report	Xusinov 82'	Stadium: Oʻzbekiston; Attendance: 260

29 March 2023 2	Navbahor Farm	0–3	Dinamo	Namangan
UZT (UTC+5)		Match report	Kojo 14', 82', 90+2'	Stadium: Navbahor; Attendance: 1246

29 March 2023 3	Unired	0–2	Kokand 1912	Samarqand
UZT (UTC+5)		Match report	Isoqjonov 9'; Shixov 42'	Stadium: Dinamo; Attendance: 924

29 March 2023 4	Lokomotiv	1–0	Aral	Namangan
UZT (UTC+5)	Toshpoʻlatov 38'	Match report		Stadium: Navbahor; Attendance: 765

30 March 2023 5	Mashʼal	3–1	Gʻijduvon	Muborak
UZT (UTC+5)	Giorgadze 35'; Petrov 53'; Saʼdullayev 70'	Match report	Boysariyev 52'	Stadium: Bahrom Vafoyev; Attendance: 848

=== 4 ===
6 April 2023 1	Xorazm	1–2	Lokomotiv	Urganch
UZT (UTC+5)	Bahromov 5'	[ Match report]	Najdenov 54'; Soirov 84'	Stadium: Xorazm SM; Attendance: 1853

8 April 2023 2	Gʻijduvon	2–2	Unired	Buxoro
UZT (UTC+5)	Joʻrayev 5'; Asadov 70'	[ Match report]	Safarov 17'; Mamatov 65'	Stadium: Buxoro FA; Attendance: 124

9 April 2023 3	Kokand 1912	2–2	Navbahor Farm	Kokand
UZT (UTC+5)	Qurbonov 54', 78'	[ Match report]	Husanov 21'; Gʻanixonov 38'	Stadium: Kokand; Attendance: 952

24 May 2023 4	Shoʻrtan	2–0	Mashʼal	G'uzor
UZT (UTC+5)	Zoirov 45+2', 48'	[ Match report]		Stadium: Gʻuzor; Attendance: 453

17 June 2023 5	Dinamo	4–0	Andijon SGS	Samarqand
UZT (UTC+5)	Nasimov 4'; Narh 43'; Ubaydullayev 45+1'; Malikov 48'	[ Match report]		Stadium: Dinamo; Attendance: 1507

=== 5 ===
6 April 2023 1	Navbahor Farm	4–0	Gʻijduvon	Urganch
UZT (UTC+5)	Husanov 7'; Ergashboyev 86', 90+3'; Tojiddinov 90'	Match report		Stadium: Xorazm SM; Attendance: 1853

8 April 2023 2	Aral	1–1	Xorazm	Nukus
UZT (UTC+5)	Yusupbaev 22'	Match report	Tengeg 61'	Stadium: BOʻFA; Attendance: 793

13 April 2023 3	Lokomotiv	0–0	Dinamo	Toshkent
UZT (UTC+5)		Match report		Stadium: Lokomotiv; Attendance: 1223

14 April 2023 4	Andijon SGS	1–4	Kokand 1912	Kokand
UZT (UTC+5)	Topivoldiyev 4'	Match report	Ismoilov 32'; Xojimirzayev 57', 62'; Moʻydinov 86'	Stadium: Kokand; Attendance: 453

16 April 2023 5	Unired	2–1	Shoʻrtan	Samarqand
UZT (UTC+5)	Shamsiddinov 65'; Aʼlamxonov 86'	Match report	Nuriddinov 68'	Stadium: Dinamo; Attendance: 782

=== 6 ===
18 April 2023 1	Gʻijduvon	3–1	Andijon SGS	Buxoro
UZT (UTC+5)	Asadov 34'; Odilov 42'; Qurbonov	Match report	Moʻydinov 8'	Stadium: Buxoro SM; Attendance: 89

20 April 2023 2	Aral	1–0	Navbahor Farm	Gʻuzor
UZT (UTC+5)	Zoirov 57'	Match report		Stadium: Gʻuzor; Attendance: 576

22 April 2023 3	Mashʼal	2–1	Unired	Muborak
UZT (UTC+5)		Match report		Stadium: Bahrom Vafoyev; Attendance: 178

22 April 2023 4	Kokand 1912	2–3	Lokomotiv	Kokand
UZT (UTC+5)	Isoqjonov 45+3'; Ismoilov 51'	Match report	Alijonov 44'; Najdenov 66'; Žuzul 74'	Stadium: Kokand; Attendance: 2408

24 April 2023 5	Dinamo	2–0	Aral	Samarqand
UZT (UTC+5)	Nasimov 83'; Tursunqulov 90+2'	Match report		Stadium: Dinamo; Attendance: 2031

=== 7 ===
26 April 2023 1	Andijon SGS	3–2	Shoʻrtan	Urganch
UZT (UTC+5)	Jumaboyev 28'; Moʻminov 85'; Moʻydinov 90+2'	Match report	Suvonov 6'; Sarimsoqov 15'	Stadium: Xorazm SM; Attendance: 303

27 April 2023 2	Navbahor Farm	2–2	Mashʼal	Namangan
UZT (UTC+5)	Mahmudhojiyev 18', 40'	Match report	Petrov 32', 61'	Stadium: Navbahor; Attendance: 2023

27 April 2023 3	Lokomotiv	5–0	Gʻijduvon	Toshkent
UZT (UTC+5)	Begishev 7'; Solovyov 38'; Žuzul 65'; Jumayev 79'; Toshpoʻlatov 81'	Match report		Stadium: Lokomotiv; Attendance: 404

29 April 2023 4	Xorazm	0–1	Dinamo	Urganch
UZT (UTC+5)		Match report	Kojo 90+7'	Stadium: Xorazm; Attendance: 2354

18 June 2023 5	Aral	0–0	Kokand 1912	Nukus
UZT (UTC+5)		Match report		Stadium: BOʻFA; Attendance: 955

=== 8 ===
4 May 2023 1	Shoʻrtan	1–2	Lokomotiv	Urganch
UZT (UTC+5)	Qobulov 83'	Match report	Zoteyev 17'; Soirov 70'	Stadium: Xorazm SM; Attendance: 303

6 May 2023 2	Unired	2–1	Navbahor Farm	Samarqand
UZT (UTC+5)	Mamatov 23'; Shamsiddinov 89'	Match report	Gʻulomjonov 7'	Stadium: Dinamo; Attendance: 352

8 May 2023 3	Kokand 1912	0–0	Xorazm	Kokand
UZT (UTC+5)		Match report		Stadium: Kokand; Attendance: 1854

9 May 2023 4	Mashʼal	3–0	Andijon SGS	Muborak
UZT (UTC+5)	Gʻulomov 4'; Petrov 83'; Obidov 90+4'	Match report		Stadium: Bahrom Vafoyev; Attendance: 384

9 May 2023 5	Gʻijduvon	1–0	Aral	Buxoro
UZT (UTC+5)	Odilov 90+4'	Match report		Stadium: Buxoro FA; Attendance: 955

=== 9 ===
14 May 2023 1	Andijon-SGS	2–1	Unired	Kokand
UZT (UTC+5)	Jumaboyev 30'; Mahammatov 90+4'	Match report	Fayzullayev 27'	Stadium: Kokand; Attendance: 373

14 May 2023 2	Xorazm	0–0	Gʻijduvon	Xorazm
UZT (UTC+5)		Match report		Stadium: Xorazm; Attendance: 1215

20 May 2023 3	Aral	0–0	Shoʻrtan	Nukus
UZT (UTC+5)		Match report		Stadium: BOʻFA; Attendance: 627

20 May 2023 4	Dinamo	3–3	Kokand 1912	Samarqand
UZT (UTC+5)	Kojo 24'; Koike 47'; Narh 53'	Match report	Shixov 27'; Xojimirzayev 60'; Akbarov 90'	Stadium: Dinamo; Attendance: 3564

15 May 2023 5	Lokomotiv	0–0	Mashʼal	Toshkent
UZT (UTC+5)		Match report		Stadium: Lokomotiv; Attendance: 1021

=== 10 ===
25 May 2023 1	Navbahor Farm	1–0	Andijon-SGS	Namangan
UZT (UTC+5)	Gʻanixonov 81'	Match report		Stadium: Navbahor; Attendance: 217

26 May 2023 2	Unired	0–4	Lokomotiv	Samarqand
UZT (UTC+5)		Match report	Soirov 12', 72'; Alijonov 66'; Abdurahmonov 90'	Stadium: Dinamo; Attendance: 1269

27 May 2023 3	Gʻijduvon	2–2	Dinamo	Buxoro
UZT (UTC+5)	Joʻrayev 49'; Ismoilov 64'	Match report	Kojo 30'; Abdujamol Isroilov 89'	Stadium: Buxoro; Attendance: 451

28 May 2023 4	Mashʼal	2–0	Aral	Muborak
UZT (UTC+5)	Petrov 5'; Gʻulomov 90+7'	Match report		Stadium: Bahrom Vafoyev; Attendance: 513

29 May 2023 5	Shoʻrtan	0–1	Xorazm	Samarqand
UZT (UTC+5)		Match report	Sharipov 65'	Stadium: Dinamo; Attendance: 466

=== 11 ===
10 June 2023 1	Aral	0–0	Unired	Nukus
UZT (UTC+5)		Match report		Stadium: BOʻFA; Attendance: 671

10 June 2023 2	Kokand 1912	5–2	Gʻijduvon	Kokand
UZT (UTC+5)	Isoqjonov 36'; Akbarov 42'; Xojimirzayev 46', 90+2'; Ismoilov 51'	Match report	Joʻraqulov 25'; Bahromov 85'	Stadium: Kokand; Attendance: 1204

10 June 2023 3	Lokomotiv	1–0	Navbahor Farm	Buxoro
UZT (UTC+5)	Soirov 1'	Match report		Stadium: Buxoro; Attendance: 621

11 June 2023 4	Xorazm	0–1	Mashʼal	Xorazm
UZT (UTC+5)		Match report	Joʻrayev 79'	Stadium: Xorazm; Attendance: 1337

11 June 2023 5	Dinamo	1–1	Shoʻrtan	Samarqand
UZT (UTC+5)	Nasimov 85'	Match report	Zoirov 35'	Stadium: Dinamo; Attendance: 3004

=== 12 ===
2 August 2023 1	Aral	3–0	Navbahor Farm	Nukus
UZT (UTC+5)	Qutiboyev 39'; Yusupbaev 64'; Turopov 72'	Match report		Stadium: BOʻFA; Attendance: 1244

3 August 2023 2	Xorazm	0–1	Unired	Xorazm
UZT (UTC+5)		Match report	Qahramonov 61'	Stadium: Xorazm; Attendance: 567

3 August 2023 3	Kokand 1912	1–0	Shoʻrtan	Kokand
UZT (UTC+5)	Xojimirzayev 45+1', 87'	Match report	Zoirov 27'	Stadium: Kokand; Attendance: 801

13 August 2023 4	Dinamo	2–0	Mashʼal	Samarqand
UZT (UTC+5)	Rahmatullayev 3'; Nasimov 90+2'	Match report		Stadium: Dinamo; Attendance: 2211

13 August 2023 5	Lokomotiv	6–1	Andijon SGS	Toshkent
UZT (UTC+5)	Žuzul 4'; Qodirqulov 24'; Safarov 58'; Jumaboyev 87', 90+2'; Abdurahmonov 90+3'	Match report	Abdulhaqov 90'	Stadium: Lokomotiv; Attendance: 510

=== 13 ===
8 August 2023 1	Mashʼal	0–1	Kokand 1912	Nukus
UZT (UTC+5)		Match report	Xojimirzayev 21'	Stadium: BOʻFA; Attendance: 612

8 August 2023 2	Andijon SGS	0–2	Aral	Andijon
UZT (UTC+5)		Match report	Nizanov 23'; Sheripov 32'	Stadium: Bobur; Attendance: 358

9 August 2023 3	Shoʻrtan	2–1	Gʻijduvon	Kokand
UZT (UTC+5)	Nuriddinov 45'; Polvonov 53'	Match report	Rahmatov 21'	Stadium: Kokand; Attendance: 105

9 August 2023 4	Unired	1–1	Dinamo	Samarqand
UZT (UTC+5)	Shamsiddinov 39'	Match report	Moʻydinov 44'	Stadium: Dinamo; Attendance: 1573

9 August 2023 5	Navbahor Farm	1–2	Xorazm	Namangan
UZT (UTC+5)	Gʻulomjonov 50'	Match report	Bahromov 21'; Yusupov 68'	Stadium: Navbahor; Attendance: 212

=== 14 ===
17 August 2023 1	Kokand 1912	2–1	Unired	Kokand
UZT (UTC+5)	Beshimov 54'; Xojimirzayev 71'	Match report	Sharipov 78'	Stadium: Kokand; Attendance: 1606

17 August 2023 2	Dinamo	2–1	Navbahor Farm	Andijon
UZT (UTC+5)	Kojo 60', 70'	Match report	Mahmudhojiyev 49'	Stadium: Bobur; Attendance: 3536

18 August 2023 3	Gʻijduvon	0–0	Mashʼal	Kokand
UZT (UTC+5)		Match report		Stadium: Kokand; Attendance: 134

18 August 2023 4	Xorazm	3–0	Andijon SGS	Xorazm
UZT (UTC+5)	Shodmonov 24'; Tengeg 60', 74'	Match report		Stadium: Xorazm; Attendance: 788

19 August 2023 5	Aral	2–0	Lokomotiv	Namangan
UZT (UTC+5)	Nizanov 19'; Qalmagambetov 90+2'	Match report		Stadium: Navbahor; Attendance: 1158

=== 15 ===
25 August 2023 1	Navbahor Farm	0–1	Kokand 1912	Kokand
UZT (UTC+5)		Match report	Sobirov 90+3'	Stadium: Kokand; Attendance: 371

25 August 2023 2	Unired	6–2	Gʻijduvon	Samarqand
UZT (UTC+5)	Mamatov 25', 45+1'; Sharipov 32', 58'; Alimov 77'; Musulmonov 85'	Match report	Rahmatov 57'; Boysariyev 81'	Stadium: Dinamo; Attendance: 755

26 August 2023 3	Mashʼal	2–1	Shoʻrtan	Muborak
UZT (UTC+5)	Baratov 15'; Petrov 45+1'	Match report	Polvonov 19'	Stadium: Bahrom Vafoyev; Attendance: 455

26 August 2023 4	Andijon SGS	0–0	Dinamo	Andijon
UZT (UTC+5)		Match report		Stadium: Bobur; Attendance: 231

26 August 2023 5	Lokomotiv	2–0	Xorazm	Toshkent
UZT (UTC+5)	Soirov 9', 43'	Match report		Stadium: Lokomotiv; Attendance: 561

=== 16 ===
2 September 2023 1	Shoʻrtan	3–0	Unired	Kokand
UZT (UTC+5)	Xudoyberdiyev 9'; Zoirov 41'; Nuriddinov 62'	Match report		Stadium: Kokand; Attendance: 412

2 September 2023 2	Gʻijduvon	3–1	Navbahor Farm	Samarqand
UZT (UTC+5)	Odilov 11'; Toʻlaganov 43'; Islomov 64'	Match report	Tojiddinov 42'	Stadium: Dinamo; Attendance: 243

3 September 2023 3	Mashʼal	5–3	Shoʻrtan	Muborak
UZT (UTC+5)	Xojimirzayev 34', 49', 52', 56'; Merzlyakov 78'	Match report	Abdulhaqov 29'; Moʻminov 39'; Rejabboyev 89'	Stadium: Bahrom Vafoyev; Attendance: 365

4 September 2023 4	Dinamo	0–0	Lokomotiv	Samarqand
UZT (UTC+5)		Match report		Stadium: Dinamo; Attendance: 6800

15 September 2023 5	Lokomotiv	2–2	Xorazm	Toshkent
UZT (UTC+5)	Yusupov 15'; Tengeg 52'	Match report	Yusupbaev 47'; Joʻraboyev 62'	Stadium: Lokomotiv; Attendance: 1917

=== 17 ===
10 September 2023 1	Aral	0–1	Dinamo	Nukus
UZT (UTC+5)		Match report	Kojo 17'	Stadium: BOʻFA; Attendance: 653

10 September 2023 2	Unired	2–3	Mashʼal	Samarqand
UZT (UTC+5)	Sharipov 6', 70'	Match report	Petrov 55', 88'; Noʻmonov 90+4'	Stadium: Dinamo; Attendance: 243

12 September 2023 3	Andijon SGS	1–2	Gʻijduvon	Andijon
UZT (UTC+5)	Moʻminov 51'	Match report	Joʻraqulov 1'; Boysariyev 74'	Stadium: Bobur; Attendance: 198

13 September 2023 4	Navbahor Farm	2–1	Shoʻrtan	Muborak
UZT (UTC+5)	Gʻulomjonov 33'; Tojiddinov 81'	Match report	Zoirov 16'	Stadium: Bahrom Vafoyev; Attendance: 263

14 September 2023 5	Lokomotiv	2–1	Kokand 1912	Toshkent
UZT (UTC+5)	Turdialiyev 33'; Jumayev 69'	Match report	Beshimov 87'	Stadium: Lokomotiv; Attendance: 811

=== 18 ===
22 September 2023 1	Mashʼal	2–0	Navbahor Farm	Muborak
UZT (UTC+5)	Baratov 74'; Petrov 90+2'	Match report		Stadium: Bahrom Vafoyev; Attendance: 319

23 September 2023 2	Shoʻrtan	5–2	Andijon SGS	Gʻuzor
UZT (UTC+5)	Polvonov 44', 46', 65'; Zoirov 66'; Yoʻldoshev 89'	Match report	Moʻminov 80', 85'	Stadium: Gʻuzor; Attendance: 307

23 September 2023 3	Gʻijduvon	0–1	Lokomotiv	Buxoro
UZT (UTC+5)	Moʻminov 51'	Match report	Solovyov 66'	Stadium: Buxoro; Attendance: 256

24 September 2023 4	Dinamo	4–0	Xorazm	Samarqand
UZT (UTC+5)	Malikov 10'; Oqboʻtayev 14'; Rahmatullayev 20'; Kojo 90+2'	Match report		Stadium: Dinamo; Attendance: 4036

25 September 2023 5	Kokand 1912	1–0	Aral	Kokand
UZT (UTC+5)	Beshimov 44'	Match report		Stadium: Kokand; Attendance: 1502

=== 19 ===
30 September 2023 1	Navbahor Farm	3–2	Unired	Namangan
UZT (UTC+5)	Mahmudhojiyev 17', 25'; Gʻulomjonov 22'	Match report	Mamatov 4'; Safarov 12'	Stadium: Navbahor; Attendance: 379

30 September 2023 2	Lokomotiv	1–0	Shoʻrtan	Toshkent
UZT (UTC+5)	Bikmayev 86'	Match report		Stadium: Lokomotiv; Attendance: 973

1 October 2023 3	Xorazm	0–0	Kokand 1912	Urganch
UZT (UTC+5)		Match report		Stadium: Xorazm; Attendance: 978

1 October 2023 4	Andijon SGS	2–2	Mashʼal	Andijon
UZT (UTC+5)	Moʻminov 48'; Karimov 90+6'	Match report	Noʻmonov 30'; Giorgadze 40'	Stadium: Bobur; Attendance: 359

2 October 2023 5	Aral	2–0	Gʻijduvon	Nukus
UZT (UTC+5)	Nizanov 44'; Yusupbaev 77'	Match report		Stadium: BOʻFA; Attendance: 918

=== 20 ===
9 October 2023 1	Mashʼal	2–1	Lokomotiv	Gʻuzor
UZT (UTC+5)	Joʻrayev 49'; Baratov 77'	Match report	Turdialiyev 20'	Stadium: Bahrom Vafoyev; Attendance: 854

9 October 2023 2	Kokand 1912	0–0	Dinamo	Kokand
UZT (UTC+5)		Match report		Stadium: Kokand; Attendance: 2605

9 October 2023 3	Unired	1–1	Andijon SGS	Urganch
UZT (UTC+5)	Fayzullayev 81'	Match report	Rejabboyev 67'	Stadium: Xorazm; Attendance: 312

10 October 2023 4	Shoʻrtan	1–1	Aral	Gʻuzor
UZT (UTC+5)	Zoirov 90+6'	Match report	Umirbekov 69'	Stadium: Gʻuzor; Attendance: 481

10 October 2023 5	Gʻijduvon	0–3	Xorazm	Buxoro
UZT (UTC+5)		Match report	Niyozmetov 4', 84'; Sharipov 72'	Stadium: Buxoro; Attendance: 251

=== 21 ===
14 October 2023 1	Dinamo	4–0	Gʻijduvon	Samarqand
UZT (UTC+5)	Rahmatullayev 39', 90+5'; Tursunqulov 88'; Mensah 90+5'	Match report		Stadium: Dinamo; Attendance: 4503

15 October 2023 2	Andijon SGS	1–2	Navbahor Farm	Andijon
UZT (UTC+5)	Moʻminov 86'	Match report	Mahmudhojiyev 62', 72'	Stadium: Bobur; Attendance: 213

15 October 2023 3	Lokomotiv	2–0	Unired	Toshkent
UZT (UTC+5)	Jumaboyev 36'; Bikmayev 65'	Match report		Stadium: Lokomotiv; Attendance: 2104

15 October 2023 4	Xorazm	0–0	Shoʻrtan	Urganch
UZT (UTC+5)		Match report		Stadium: Xorazm; Attendance: 1150

16 October 2023 5	Aral	1–0	Mashʼal	Nukus
UZT (UTC+5)	Nizanov 53'	Match report		Stadium: BOʻFA; Attendance: 268

=== 22 ===
25 October 2023 1	Navbahor Farm	1–3	Lokomotiv	Namangan
UZT (UTC+5)	Alijonov 47'	Match report	Abdurahmonov 21', 45+2'; Alijonov	Stadium: Navbahor; Attendance: 256

25 October 2023 2	Unired	1–1	Aral	Samarqand
UZT (UTC+5)	Mamatov 88'	Match report	Sheripov 90+3'	Stadium: Dinamo; Attendance: 377

25 October 2023 3	Shoʻrtan	2–1	Dinamo	Toshkent
UZT (UTC+5)	Polvonov 78'; Mijić 90+14' (o.g.)	Match report	Malikov 90+15'	Stadium: Lokomotiv; Attendance: 475

25 October 2023 4	Mashʼal	1–0	Xorazm	Muborak
UZT (UTC+5)	Abdulhamidov 72'	Match report		Stadium: Bahrom Vafoyev; Attendance: 213

25 October 2023 5	Gʻijduvon	1–8	Kokand 1912	Buxoro
UZT (UTC+5)	Toʻlaganov 67'	Match report	Ismoilov 14', 52'; Xojimirzayev 63', 66'; Beshimov 71'; Shixov 78'; Mamatxoʻjayev 79'; Komilov 83'	Stadium: Buxoro; Attendance: 432

== Results ==
=== Results table ===
Home \ Away	AND	ARA	DIN	GIJ	KOK	LOK	MAS	NAV	SHU	UNR	XOR
Andijon-SGS	—	0–2	0–0	1–2	1–4	0–4	2–2	1–2	3–2	2–1	2–1
Aral	3–2	—	0–1	2–0	0–0	2–0	1–0	3–0	0–0	0–0	1–1
Dinamo Samarqand	4–0	2–0	—	4–0	3–3	0–0	2–0	2–1	1–1	1–0	4–0
G'ijduvon	3–1	1–0	2–2	—	1–8	0–1	0–0	3–1	1–2	2–2	0–3
Kokand 1912	5–3	1–0	0–0	5–2	—	2–3	1–0	2–2	2–1	2–1	0–0
Lokomotiv Tashkent	6–1	1–0	0–0	5–0	2–1	—	0–0	1–0	1–0	2–0	2–0
Mash'al Mubarek	3–0	2–0	1–3	3–1	0–1	2–1	—	2–0	2–1	2–1	1–0
Navbahor Namangan-2	1–0	0–0	0–3	4–0	0–1	1–3	2–2	—	2–1	3–2	1–2
Shurtan Guzar	5–2	1–1	2–1	2–1	3–3	1–2	2–0	1–0	—	3–0	0–1
UniRed Samarqand	1–1	1–1	1–1	6–2	0–2	0–4	2–3	2–1	2–1	—	1–0
Xorazm Urganch	3–0	2–2	0–1	0–0	0–0	1–2	0–1	1–0	0–0	1–1	—

Updated to match(es) played on 25 October 2023. Source: Uzbekistan Professional Football League
Legend: Blue = home team win; Yellow = draw; Red = away team win.

=== Results by match played ===
Team ╲ Round	1	2	3	4	5	6	7	8	9	10	11	12	13	14	15	16	17	18	19	20	21	22
Andijon-SGS	L	L	W	L	L	L	W	L	W	L	P	L	L	L	D	L	L	L	D	D	L	P
Aral	D	W	L	P	D	L	D	L	D	L	D	W	W	W	P	D	L	L	W	D	W	D
Dinamo Samarqand	W	W	W	W	D	W	W	P	D	D	D	W	D	W	D	D	W	W	P	D	W	L
G'ijduvon	P	L	L	D	L	W	L	W	D	D	L	P	L	D	L	W	W	L	L	L	L	L
Kokand 1912	D	W	W	D	W	L	D	D	D	P	W	W	W	W	W	W	L	W	D	D	P	W
Lokomotiv Tashkent	W	P	W	W	D	W	W	W	D	W	W	W	P	L	W	D	W	W	W	L	W	W
Mash'al Mubarek	L	L	W	L	P	W	D	W	D	W	W	L	L	D	W	P	W	W	D	W	L	W
Navbahor Namangan-2	D	L	L	D	W	L	D	L	P	W	L	L	L	L	L	L	W	L	W	P	W	L
Shurtan Guzar	D	W	P	W	L	W	L	L	D	L	D	L	W	P	L	W	L	W	L	D	D	W
UniRed Samarqand	W	L	L	D	W	L	P	W	L	L	D	D	D	L	W	L	L	P	L	D	L	D
Xorazm Urganch	L	W	L	L	D	P	L	D	D	W	L	D	W	W	L	D	P	L	D	W	D	L

Updated to match(es) played on 25 October 2023. Source: Championat.asia
W = Win; D = Draw; L = Loss; P = Postponed

=== Positions by round ===
Team ╲ Round	1	2	3	4	5	6	7	8	9	10	11	12	13	14	15	16	17	18	19	20	21	22
Andijon-SGS	11	11	9	9	10	11	8	9	6	10	10	11	11	11	10	10	11	11	11	11	11	11
Aral	6	4	5	5	6	8	9	11	11	11	11	7	6	5	5	6	6	6	6	6	5	6
Dinamo Samarqand	2	1	1	1	2	1	2	2	2	2	2	2	2	2	2	3	2	2	2	2	2	2
G'ijduvon	8	9	11	11	11	10	11	7	8	9	9	10	10	9	9	9	9	9	9	9	10	10
Kokand 1912	4	2	2	3	1	3	3	3	3	4	3	3	3	3	3	2	3	3	3	3	3	3
Lokomotiv Tashkent	1	5	3	2	3	2	1	1	1	1	1	1	1	1	1	1	1	1	1	1	1	1
Mash'al Mubarek	10	10	6	7	9	6	5	4	4	3	4	4	4	4	4	4	4	4	4	4	4	4
Navbahor Namangan-2	7	8	10	10	5	7	7	8	9	7	7	9	9	10	11	11	10	10	10	10	8	9
Shurtan Guzar	5	3	4	4	7	4	4	6	7	5	5	5	5	6	7	5	5	5	5	5	6	5
UniRed Samarqand	3	6	8	6	4	5	6	5	5	6	6	6	7	8	6	8	8	8	8	8	9	8
Xorazm Urganch	9	7	7	8	8	9	10	10	10	8	8	8	8	7	8	7	7	7	7	7	7	7

Leader and promotion to Uzbekistan Super League
Promotion to Uzbekistan Super League
Relegation to Uzbekistan First League

Updated to match(es) played on 25 October 2023. Source: Uzbekistan Professional Football League

== Season statistics ==
=== Goalscorers ===
As of match played 25 October 2023

Rank	Player	Club	Goals
1	(Uzbekistan) Anvarjojn Hojimirzayev	Kokand 1912	16
2	(Kyrgyzstan) Joel Kojo	Dinamo Samarqand	12
3	(Ukraine) Serhiy Petrov	Mash'al Mubarek	10
4	(Uzbekistan) Muhriddin Zoirov	Shurtan Guzar	9
5	(Tajikistan) Rustam Soirov	Lokomotiv Tashkent	8
6	(Uzbekistan) Shohrux Mahmudhojiyev	Navbahor Namangan-2	7
6	(Uzbekistan) Zafar Polvonov	Shurtan Guzar	7
6	(Uzbekistan) Asomiddin Mamatov	UniRed Samarqand	7
9	(Uzbekistan) Abubakir Muydinov	Andijon-SGS	6
9	(Uzbekistan) Islom Sharipov	UniRed Samarqand	6
9	(Uzbekistan) Doniyor Ismoilov	Kokand 1912	6

Own goals

- (Uzbekistan) Khojiakbar Mo'minov of Andijon-SGS against Lokomotiv Tashkent - 16 March 2023
- (Uzbekistan) Yursunali Topvoldiyev of Andijon-SGS against Kokand 1912 - 14 April 2023
- (Uzbekistan) Ramis Begishev of G'ijduvon against Lokomotiv Tashkent - 27 April 2023
- (Uzbekistan) Shokir Yo‘ldoshev of Shurtan Guzar against Andijon-SGS - 23 September 2023
- (Serbia) Dusan Micic of Dinamo Samarqand against Shurtan Guzar - 25 October 2023

=== Hat-tricks ===
Player	For	Against	Result	Date	Ref
(Kyrgyzstan) Joel Kojo	Dinamo Samarqand	Navbahor Namangan-2	0–3 (A)	29 March 2023	
(Uzbekistan) Anvarjojn Hojimirzayev^{4}	Kokand 1912	Andijon-SGS	5–3 (H)	3 September 2023	
(Uzbekistan) Zafar Polvonov	Shurtan Guzar	Andijon-SGS	5–2 (H)	23 September 2023	

- ^{4} Player scored 4 goals

=== Clean sheets ===
As of match played 25 October 2023

Rank	Player	Club	Goals
1	(Uzbekistan) Abdumavlon Abdujalilov	Lokomotiv Tashkent	12
2	(Uzbekistan) Shohjahon Nasimov	Aral	9
3	(Uzbekistan) Nizomiddin Ziyovutdinov	Kokand 1912	8
3	(Uzbekistan) Ravshanbek Yagudin	Dinamo Samarqand	8
5	(Uzbekistan) Hojiakbar Jo‘rayev	Xorazm Urganch	6
6	(Uzbekistan) Farhod Rahmatov	Dinamo Samarqand	5
6	(Uzbekistan) Mashhurjon Muhammadjonov	Mash'al Mubarek	5
8	(Uzbekistan) Sherzod Abduraimov	Shurtan Guzar	4
9	(Uzbekistan) Mirjalolbek Mamatxanov	Navbahor Namangan-2	3
10	(Uzbekistan) Akmal Rahimov	G'ijduvon	2
10	(Uzbekistan) Umid Hamroyev	Xorazm Urganch	2
10	(Uzbekistan) Jahongir Jamolov	UniRed Samarqand	2
10	(Uzbekistan) Rustam Nortojiyev	Kokand 1912	2
10	(Uzbekistan) Izzatulla Tursunov	Mash'al Mubarek	2

=== Attendances ===
As of match played 25 October 2023

==== By round ====
2023 Uzbekistan Pro League Attendance
Round	Total	GP.	Avg. Per Game
Round 1	6,531	5	1,306
Round 2	9,805	5	1,961
Round 3	3,597	5	719
Round 4	5,140	5	1,028
Round 5	4,409	5	882
Round 6	5,282	5	1,056
Round 7	6,039	5	1,208
Round 8	3,330	5	666
Round 9	6,800	5	1,360
Round 10	2,916	5	583
Round 11	6,837	5	1,367
Round 12	5,333	5	1,067
Round 13	2,860	5	572
Round 14	7,222	5	1,444
Round 15	2,373	5	475
Round 16	9,737	5	1,947
Round 17	1,925	5	385
Round 18	6,420	5	1,284
Round 19	3,537	5	707
Round 20	4,503	5	901
Round 21	8,238	5	1,648
Round 22	1,753	5	351
Total	107,787	110	980

==== By team ====
Team \ Match played	1	2	3	4	5	6	7	8	9	10	Total	Average
Andijon-SGS	215	260	764	303	373	358	231	-	359	213	3,076	308
Aral	1,243	793	955	627	671	1,244	1,158	653	918	268	8,530	853
Dinamo Samarqand	3,216	2,031	3,564	3,004	1,507	2,211	3,536	6,800	4,036	4,503	34,408	3,441
G'ijduvon	952	124	89	137	451	134	243	256	251	432	3,069	307
Kokand 1912	2,541	1,203	2,408	1,854	1,204	801	1,606	365	1,502	2,605	16,089	1,609
Lokomotiv Tashkent	765	1,223	404	1,021	621	510	561	811	903	2,104	8,923	892
Mash'al Mubarek	924	848	178	384	513	612	455	319	854	213	5,300	530
Navbahor Namangan-2	1,252	1,246	847	2,023	217	371	212	198	379	256	7,001	700
Shurtan Guzar	831	576	603	453	466	105	412	307	481	475	4,709	471
UniRed Samarqand	3,309	478	782	352	1,269	1,573	755	263	312	377	9,470	947
Xorazm Urganch	1853	1,853	2,354	1,215	1,337	567	788	1,917	978	1,150	14,012	1,401

== See also ==
- 2023 Uzbekistan Super League
- 2023 Uzbekistan First League
- 2023 Uzbekistan Cup
