= Miguel Álvarez =

Miguel Álvarez may refer to:

- Miguel Álvarez Castro (1795–1856), Salvadoran politician and poet
- Miguel Alvarez del Toro (1917–1996), Mexican biologist
- Miguel Ángel Álvarez (1941–2011), Puerto Rican journalist, comedian and actor
- Miguel Álvarez Santamaría (born 1945), Mexican politician
- Miguel Álvarez Pozo (1949–2016), basketball player from Cuba
- Miguel Álvarez (football manager, born 1958), Spanish football manager
- Miguel Álvarez (rower) (born 1971), Spanish Olympic rower
- Miguel Álvarez-Fernández (born 1979), Spanish composer
- Miguel Álvarez (football manager, born 1982), Spanish football manager
- Miguel Alvarez (Oz), a fictional character on the television show Oz

== See also ==
- Carlos Miguel Álvarez (born 1943), Mexican cyclist
