= Neville Tengeg =

Cameroonian football player

Personal information
- Full name: Neville Mbanwei Tengeg
- Date of birth: 9 October 1999 (age 27)
- Place of birth: Bamenda, Cameroon
- Height: 1.80 m (5 ft 11 in)
- Position: Forward

Team information
- Current team: Scottland

Youth career
- Mount Cameroon

Senior career*
Years	Team	Apps	(Gls)
2023	Khorazm	18	(4)
2023–2025	Kirivong Sok Sen Chey	40	(20)
2025–2026	Deltras	27	(11)
2026–	Scottland	0	(0)
- * Club domestic league appearances and goals as of 3 May 2026

Neville Mbanwei Tengeg (born 9 October 1999) is a Cameroonian professional footballer who plays as a forward for Zimbabwe Premier Soccer League club Scottland.

== Club career ==
Born in Bamenda, Cameroon, Tengeg began his professional career in Uzbekistan, joining Khorazm in the 2023 season, In his first season, he scored 4 goals and provided 2 assists in 18 appearances. He also scored 5 goals and provided 1 assist in 5 matches with Khorazm in the 2023 Uzbekistan Cup.

In December 2023, Tengeg moved to Cambodian Premier League club Kirivong Sok Sen Chey on a year contract. On 24 December 2023, he scored his first league goal in his debut match for Kirivong against Nagaworld in a 6–1 win. On 6 January 2024, he scored the opening goal in a 1–1 draw over ISI Dangkor Senchey. On 17 February, he scored a brace in a 2–2 draw against Angkor Tiger, and scored another brace against Prey Veng in a match which ended in a 3–0 win on 25 February. Tengeg became a regular starter for Kirivong under coach Sabone Venta, and saw an improvement in his performances for the side in the number of matches, until the season ended, he appeared in 13 matches, and scored 11 goals.

On 7 June 2024, Tengeg extended his contract with the club for one season. Tengeg scored his first goal of the 2024–25 season on 19 September 2024, in a home game against Angkor Tiger. The game ended in a 1–3 loss for Kirivong. On 2 June 2025, Tengeg officially left Kirivong. He played two seasons for the club in the Cambodian Premier League making 40 appearances and scoring 20 goals.

On 13 August 2025, Tengeg signed with Indonesian club Deltras, coming from Kirivong Sok Sen Chey. On 14 September 2025, he scored his first league goal in his debut match for Deltras against Persela Lamongan in a 1–2 away win at Surajaya Stadium. On 12 October 2025, he scored a brace in a 2–0 home win against Persipura Jayapura.

== Career statistics ==
=== Club ===
As of 3 May 2026

Club	Season	League			Cup		Continental		Other		Total	
Club	Season	Division	Apps	Goals	Apps	Goals	Apps	Goals	Apps	Goals	Apps	Goals
Khorazm	2023	Uzbekistan Pro League	18	4	5 (Note: Appearance(s) in Uzbekistan Cup)	5	–		0	0	23	9
Kirivong Sok Sen Chey	2023–24	Cambodian Premier League	13	11	0	0	–		0	0	13	11
Kirivong Sok Sen Chey	2024–25	Cambodian Premier League	27	9	0	0	–		0	0	27	9
Deltras	2025–26	Championship	27	11	0	0	–		0	0	27	11
Career total			85	35	5	5	0	0	0	0	90	40
