= Shokhnazar Norbekov =

Uzbek footballer

Shohnazar Norbekov
Personal information
- Full name: Shohnazar Jumaniyoz o'g'li Norbekov
- Date of birth: 18 July 1994 (age 32)
- Place of birth: Yangiyer, Uzbekistan
- Position: Forward

Team information
- Current team: Guliston
- Number: 10

Youth career
- Metallurg Bekabad U21

Senior career*
Years	Team	Apps	(Gls)
2011-2016	Metallurg Bekabad	53	(5)
2016-2019	AGMK Olmaliq	59	(6)
2019	Surkhon Termez	12	(2)
2020-2021	Kokand 1912	44	(6)
2022	Metallurg Bekabad	8	(1)
2022	Kokand 1912	13	(6)
2023	Turon Yaypan	11	(1)
2023	Sada Sumut	2	(0)
2024	Kaisar	23	(1)
2025–2026	Mash'al	8	(0)
2026–	Guliston	0	(0)

International career
2013	Uzbekistan U20	2	(0)
- * Club domestic league appearances and goals as of 26 May 2025

Shokhnazar Norbekov (Uzbek: Shohnazar Jumaniyoz o'g'li Norbekov; born 18 July 1994 in Yangiyer) is an Uzbek professional footballer who plays as a forward for Guliston.

== Club career ==
He began his professional career in 2011 with Metallurg Bekabad. On 23 October 2011, he made his debut in the Uzbekistan championship in a match against Bunyodkor. In January 2023, he signed a contract with Turon.

In September 2023, Shohnazar signed a contract with Indonesian club Sada Sumut.

In February 2024, he signed a contract with the Kazakh club Kaisar.

== Honours ==
- Uzbekistan Cup winner: 2018
