= Miloje Preković =

Serbian footballer (born 1991)

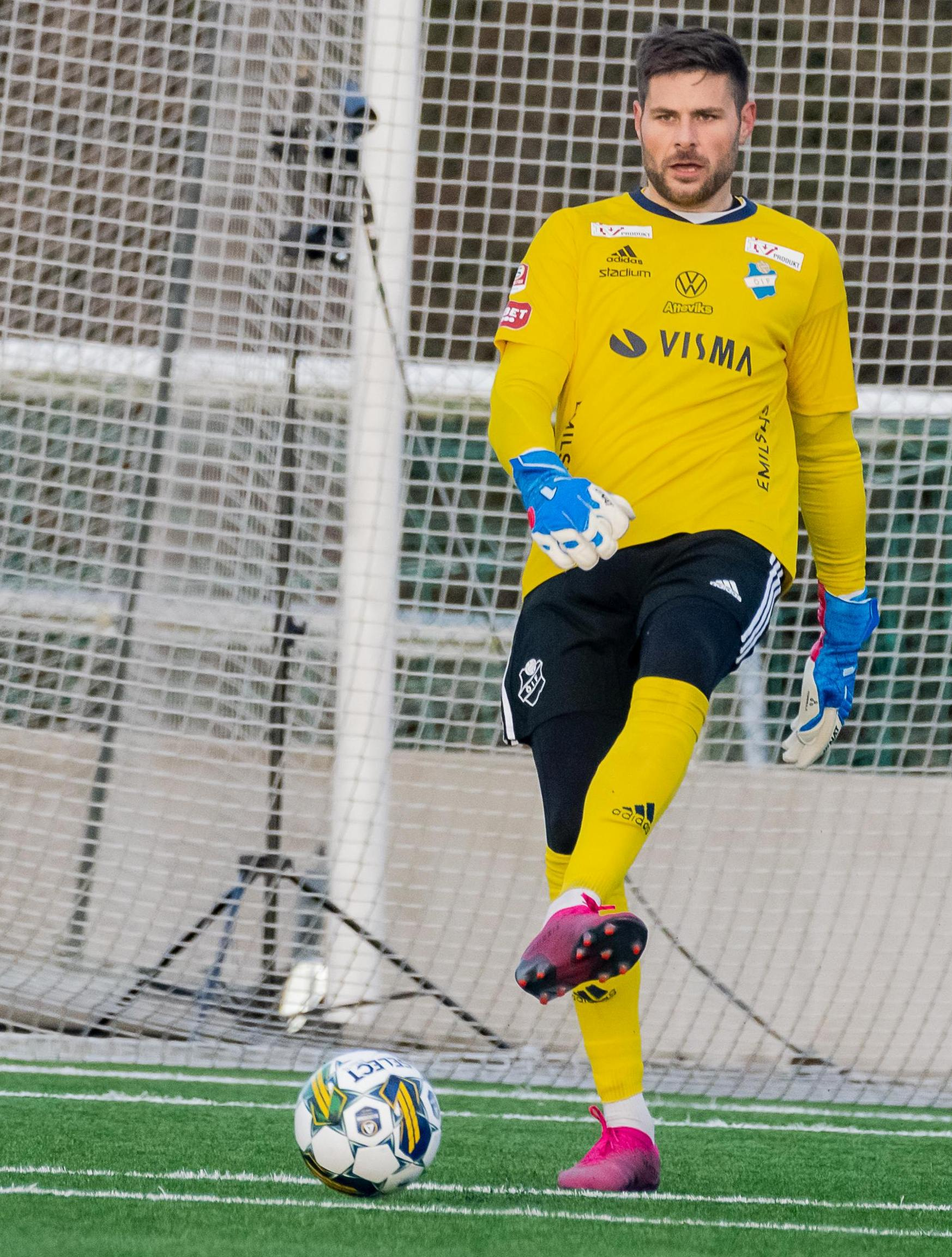

Personal information
- Date of birth: 7 June 1991 (age 35)
- Place of birth: Aranđelovac, SFR Yugoslavia
- Height: 1.93 m (6 ft 4 in)
- Position: Goalkeeper

Team information
- Current team: Novi Pazar
- Number: 12

Youth career
- Mladenovac
- Košice

Senior career*
Years	Team	Apps	(Gls)
2009–2010	Mladenovac	15	(0)
2010–2011	Košice B	15	(0)
2011–2012	Košice	1	(0)
2013–2014	Mladost Lučani	2	(0)
2015	Sloga Kraljevo	15	(0)
2015–2016	Iskra Borčice	9	(0)
2016–2017	Yenisey Krasnoyarsk	0	(0)
2017–2018	OFK Beograd	0	(0)
2018–2021	Inđija	82	(0)
2021	Voždovac	46	(0)
2022	Dinamo Samarqand	15	(0)
2023	Östers IF	26	(1)
2024	IF Karlstad	15	(0)
2024–2025	Napredak Kruševac	12	(0)
2025–	Novi Pazar	4	(0)
- * Club domestic league appearances and goals as of 12 June 2026

Miloje Preković (Serbian Cyrillic: Милоје Прековић, born 7 June 1991) is a Serbian footballer who plays as a goalkeeper for Novi Pazar.

== Club career ==
He made his debut for Košice in a home fixture against Spartak Trnava on 27 April 2011. In this match he conceded three goals.

=== Östers IF ===
Scored the equaliser in the 97th minute with a header after a corner from fellow countryman Vladimir Rodić in the important 2-2 home game vs Västerås SK on the 18th of september 2023.

== Honours ==
Mladost Lučani

- Serbian First League: 2013–14
