= Jordi Fabregat =

Spanish footballer and manager

Personal information
- Full name: Jordi Fabregat Valmaña
- Date of birth: 4 December 1961 (age 64)
- Place of birth: Tortosa, Spain
- Height: 1.75 m (5 ft 9 in)
- Position: Defender

Youth career
- Tortosa

Senior career*
Years	Team	Apps	(Gls)
1977–1978	Tortosa		
1978–1979	Andorra	8	(1)
1979–1982	Terrassa	88	(1)
1982–1986	Hércules	94	(2)
1986–1987	Córdoba	37	(0)
1987–1991	Xerez	114	(1)
1991–1993	Yeclano	45	(1)
1993–1994	San Fernando		
1994	Tortosa	13	(1)
1994–1995	Xerez	33	(0)
Total		432	(7)

International career
1979–1980	Spain U18	10	(1)
1981	Spain U19	3	(0)
1981	Spain U20	4	(1)
1983	Spain U21	2	(0)

Managerial career
- 1995–1997: Xerez (youth)
- 1997–2000: Tortosa
- 2001–2002: Tortosa
- 2002–2003: Tortosa
- 2005: La Sénia
- 2005: Mar Menor
- 2006–2009: Amposta
- 2009: Portuense
- 2009–2010: Rapitenca
- 2010–2012: Amposta
- 2012–2015: Conquense
- 2015: Jumilla
- 2016–2018: Guijuelo
- 2019: Arandina
- 2021: Conquense
- 2021–2022: Ordino
- 2022: Surkhon Termez
- 2022–2023: Tortosa
- 2023: Logroñés
- * Club domestic league appearances and goals

Jordi Fabregat Valmaña (born 4 December 1961) is a Spanish retired footballer who played as a defender, and is a current manager.

== Club career ==
Born in Tortosa, Tarragona, Catalonia, Fabregat made his senior debuts with CD Tortosa, aged only 16, in the regional leagues. After appearing with Terrassa FC in Segunda División B, he joined Hércules CF in the 1982 summer.

With the Valencian he was promoted to La Liga in the 1983–84 campaign, appearing in 33 matches and scoring two goals. He made his top flight debut on 2 September 1984, starting in a 1–0 away win against Real Zaragoza.

In the 1986 summer, after falling down the pecking order, Fabregat moved to Córdoba CF also in the third level. After appearing regularly for the Andalusians he signed for Segunda División club Xerez CD in the following year, and appeared regularly during his four-year spell.

In 1991 Fabregat joined Yeclano CF in the third division. He subsequently represented Tercera División sides CD San Fernando and Tortosa, and played his last season with Xerez in division three before retiring in 1995.

== Manager career ==
After working in the youth sides of his last club Xerez, Fabregat returned to Tortosa in 1997, now as manager. His side reached the play-offs in 1998, and remained in charge of the side until 2000.

Fabregat returned to Tortosa in January 2001, replacing Xavi Cid. He left again on 7 June 2002, but returned to the club on 10 December, after Juanjo Rovira was dismissed.

In November 2003, Fabregat resigned from Tortosa and ended his third spell at the club. In January 2005, he took over CF La Sénia in the regional leagues, but only managed the club on eight occasions before moving to AD Mar Menor-San Javier in March.

In March 2006, Fabregat was appointed manager of CF Amposta. On 29 January 2009, he left the club after rescinding his contract, and took over Racing Club Portuense.

After failing to avoid relegation, Fabregat was sacked and joined UE Rapitenca on 9 October 2009. He left the latter side in May 2010, and returned to Amposta in November.

On 1 August 2012, Fabregat was named UB Conquense manager. After taking the club back to the third division in his first season, he resigned on 26 January 2015.

Fabregat took over FC Jumilla on 17 July 2015, but was sacked on 10 November. He remained one year without a club before being named in charge of CD Guijuelo on 16 November 2016, and left the club on 17 May 2018.

On 16 July 2019, Fabregat was appointed manager of Arandina CF in the fourth tier, being dismissed on 29 October. He returned to Conquense on 10 March 2021, but left on 24 June, and moved abroad to Andorran side FC Ordino on 27 August.

Fabregat left Ordino in January 2022, and spent a short period at Surkhon Termez in Uzbekistan before returning to Tortosa on 22 April of that year. On 19 June 2023, he was appointed in charge of Primera Federación side SD Logroñés, but only lasted seven matches before being dismissed on 10 October.
