= Markaziy Stadium (Kokand) =

Stadium in Uzbekistan

Coordinates: 40.5469°N 70.9398°E

Kokand Markaziy Stadium Uzbek: Qoʻqon «Markaziy» stadioni
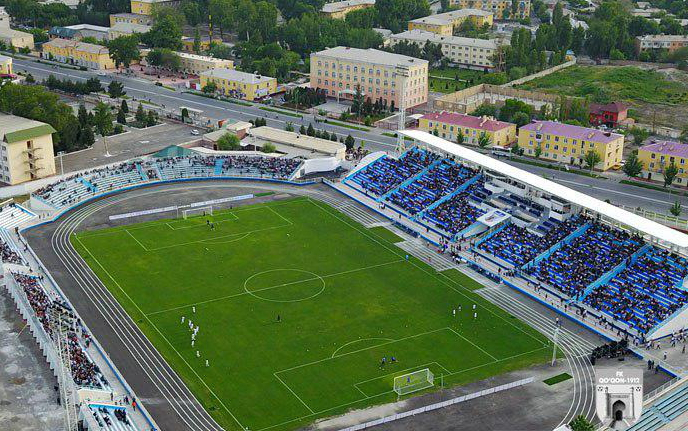
- Interactive map of Kokand Markaziy Stadium; Uzbek: Qoʻqon «Markaziy» stadioni
- Location: Kokand, Uzbekistan
- Owner: FC Kokand 1912
- Operator: Uzbekistan Football Association
- Capacity: 10,500
- Surface: grass
- Field size: 112m x 72m

Tenants
- Kokand 1912, Uzbekistan national football team

Kokand Central Stadium is a multi-purpose stadium in the city of Kokand, Fergana Region, Uzbekistan. The arena holds 10,500 spectators and is the home stadium of the local football club Kokand 1912. The stadium has natural turf.

== History ==
The stadium was built in the late 1950s and has been reconstructed several times. The stadium at various times bore the names Komsomolsky, Trudovoy, Kokandsky, Mukhiddinovsky. Today, this arena is called the Central Stadium of Kokand. The stadium was underwent a large-scale reconstruction in 2017-2018.

== See also ==
- Istiqlol Stadium
