= Miguel Álvarez (football manager, born 1982) =

Spanish football manager (born 1982

Personal information
- Full name: Miguel Álvarez Sánchez
- Date of birth: 27 November 1982 (age 43)
- Place of birth: Ourense, Spain

Team information
- Current team: SK Dynamo České Budějovice (sporting director)

Managerial career
- Years: Team
- 2014–2015: Al-Nassr (assistant)
- 2015–2017: Al Fateh (assistant)
- 2017–2018: Thinadhoo Sports
- 2018: Al-Ettifaq (analyst)
- 2018: Al-Khaleej (assistant)
- 2019: Al-Nasr (assistant)
- 2019: Shabab Al Ahli (analyst)
- 2019: Al Fateh (chief analyst)
- 2020: Wadi Degla (chief analyst)
- 2020–2021: Fujairah (assistant)
- 2021: Al-Adalah (assistant)
- 2022: Surkhon (assistant)
- 2022: Surkhon
- 2023: Emirates Club (assistant)
- 2023–2024: Emirates Club (performance manager)
- 2024: UAE U17 (analyst)
- 2024–2025: Al-Arabi (technical director)
- 2025–2026: Al-Ettifaq (video analyst)
- 2026–: SK Dynamo České Budějovice

Miguel Álvarez Sánchez (born 27 November 1982) is a Spanish football manager and official. He has been the sporting director of SK Dynamo České Budějovice since April 2026.

== Early life ==
He moved with his family from Spain to Germany at a young age. He is a native of Ourense, Spain.

== Career ==
In 2014, he was appointed manager of Saudi Arabian side Al Nassr. He helped the club win the league. In 2022, he was appointed manager of Uzbekistani side Surkhon. He has written a book and worked as an analyst for an Argentine radio station.

== Personal life ==
He has been married. He has two daughters.
