= Uzbekistan Stadium (Yaypan) =

Stadium in Fergana Region, Uzbekistan

Coordinates: 40.3763°N 70.8256°E

Uzbekistan Stadium Uzbek: Oʻzbekiston stadioni
- Interactive map of Uzbekistan Stadium; Uzbek: Oʻzbekiston stadioni
- Former names: Mekhnat stadium
- Location: Yaypan, Uzbekistan
- Owner: Turon
- Operator: Uzbekistan Football Association
- Capacity: 8.000
- Surface: natural turf, grass
- Field size: 112m x 72m

Construction
- Opened: 1975
- Renovated: 2018-2022

Tenants
- Turon, Uzbekistan national football team

Uzbekistan Stadium (Uzbek: Oʻzbekiston Stadioni) is a stadium located in Yaypan, Uzbekistan District, Fergana Region and is the home stadium of FC Turon.

== History ==
The stadium is located in Uzbekistan District and was built in the 1970s and its former name was "Mehnat" stadium. Local teams such as "Olimjon Akbarov" and "Mehnat" played at the stadium. Today it is the home stadium of the local FC Turon. Uzbekistan Stadium has undergone extensive renovations since 2018. The quality of the stadium has been brought to a level that meets the requirements of AFC and FIFA. The stadium hosted 2022 Uzbekistan Super Cup, a high-level match.. The stadium can accommodate 8,000 fans.
