= 2011 Uzbekistan First League =

Uzbekistan First League
- Season: 2011
- Champions: Lokomotiv Tashkent
- Promoted: Lokomotiv Tashkent
- Top goalscorer: 30 goals Zaynitdin Tadjiyev

The 2011 Uzbekistan First League was the 20th season of 2nd level football in Uzbekistan since 1992. It is split in an Eastern and Western zone, each featuring 12 teams.

== Teams and locations ==
Locations of the 2011 Uzbekistan First League Teams

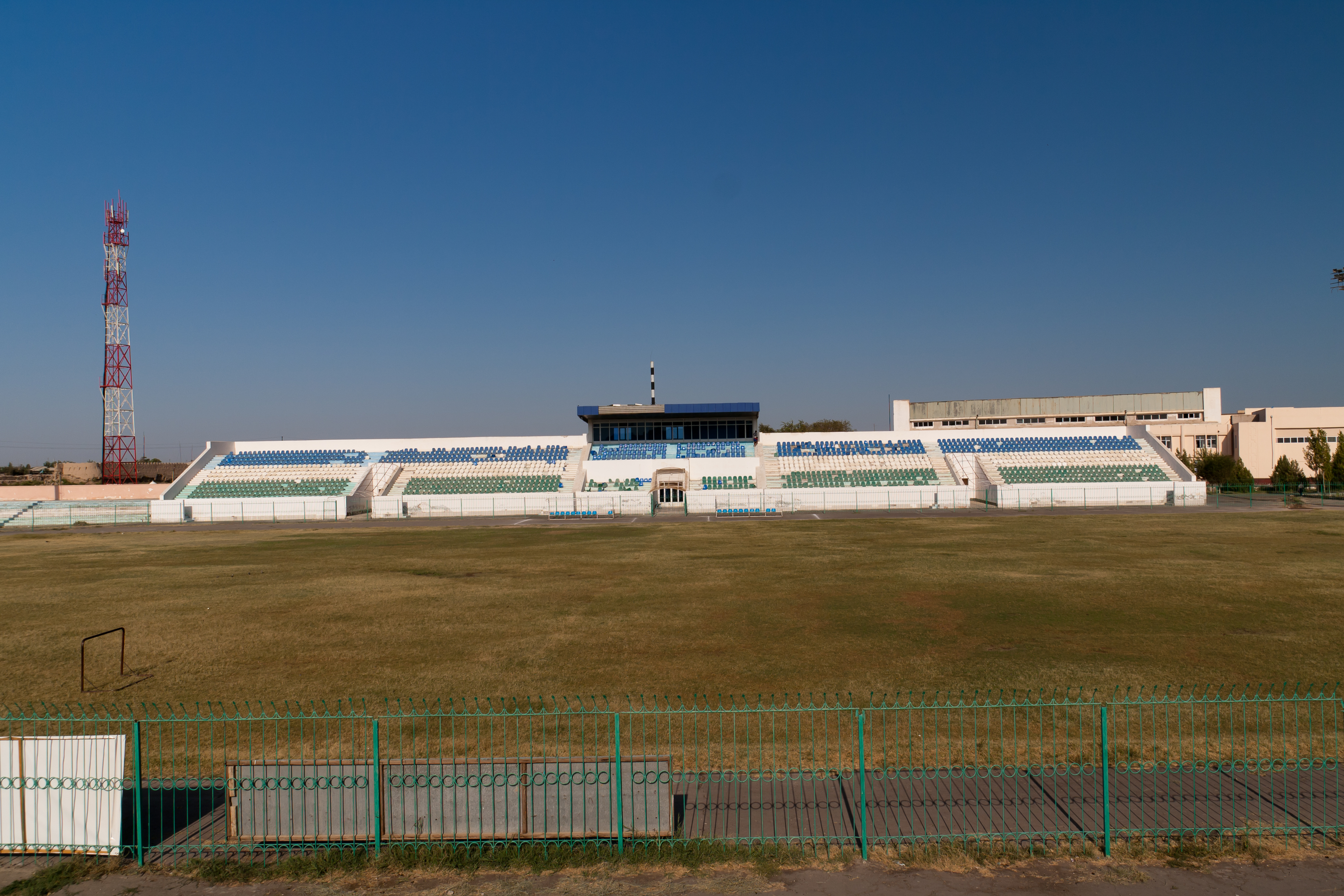
Stadium of FK Khiva

Team	Location	Stadium	Stadium capacity
Erkurgan	Koson		
Xorazm FK Urganch	Urganch	Xorazm Stadium	12,000
Dynamo Ghallakor	Ghallaorol		
Jaykhun	Nukus		
Mash'al Akademiya	Muborak		
FK Khiva	Khiva		
Registon	Samarkand		
Surkhon-2011	Termez		
Zarafshon NCZ	Zarafshan		
Nasaf-2	Qarshi		
Jomboy	Jomboy		
Shurchi-Lochin	Shurchi		
Lokomotiv Tashkent	Tashkent	TTYMI Stadium	6,010
FK Guliston	Guliston		
FK Yangiyer	Yangiyer		
FC NBU Asia	Tashkent		
Imkon Oltiariq	Altyaryk		
FK Kosonsoy	Kosonsoy		
Bunyodkor-2	Chirchiq	Chirchiq Stadium	6,000
Oqtepa	Tashkent		
FK Atlaschi	Margilan		
FC Spartak Tashkent	Tashkent		
Chust-Pakhtakor	Chust		
Durmon-Sport	Tashkent		

== Competition format ==
League consists of two regional groups: zone "East" and "West". The season comprises two phases. The first phase consists of a regular home-and-away schedule: each team plays the other teams twice. The top eight teams of the first phase from each zone will be merged in one tournament and compete for the championship. The bottom four teams of each zone after first phase will be directly relegated to 2nd division.

After matchday 6, Shurchi Lochin started tournament in Zone "West", officially withdrew from the competition in Mai, 2011, due to lack of financing. Because team played less than half of its games, all team's results are canceled.

== First phase ==
=== Zone "West" ===
Pos	Team	Pld	W	D	L	GF	GA	GF	Pts	Qualification or relegation
1	FC Erkurgan	20	14	2	4	46	19	+27	44	Promotion to the 2nd phase of championship
2	Xorazm FK Urganch	20	12	4	4	40	15	+25	40	.
3	Dynamo Ghallakor	20	12	2	6	33	26	+7	38	.
4	Jaykhun	20	11	2	7	38	29	+9	35	.
5	Mash'al Akademiya	20	10	3	7	31	24	+7	33	.
6	FK Khiva	20	8	6	6	28	22	+6	30	.
7	Registon	20	8	1	11	23	31	-8	25	.
8	Surkhon-2011	20	7	3	10	30	26	-4	24	.
9	Zarafshon NCZ	20	6	2	12	20	38	-18	20	
10	Nasaf-2	20	4	3	13	16	39	-23	15	
11	Jomboy	20	4	0	16	19	55	-36	12	

=== Zone "East" ===
Pos	Team	Pld	W	D	L	GF	GA	GF	Pts	Qualification or relegation
1	Lokomotiv Tashkent	22	19	2	1	68	6	+62	59	Promotion to the 2nd phase of championship
2	FK Guliston	22	14	5	3	40	17	+23	47	.
3	FK Yangiyer	22	10	7	5	25	23	+2	37	.
4	FC NBU Asia	22	10	5	6	38	25	+13	35	.
5	Imkon Oltiariq	22	10	5	7	24	27	-3	35	.
6	FK Kosonsoy	22	8	5	9	19	28	-9	29	.
7	Bunyodkor-2	22	8	2	12	29	30	-1	26	.
8	Oqtepa	22	8	2	12	20	40	-20	26	.
9	FK Atlaschi	22	6	7	9	23	33	-10	25	
10	FC Spartak Tashkent	22	4	10	8	17	22	-5	22	
11	Chust-Pakhtakor	22	4	4	14	14	33	-19	16	
12	Durmon-Sport	22	3	2	17	23	54	-31	11	

== Second phase ==
=== League table ===
Pos	Team	Pld	W	D	L	GF	GA	GF	Pts	Qualification or relegation
1	Lokomotiv Tashkent	30	25	4	1	102	11	+91	79	Promotion to Uzbek League
2	FK Guliston	30	19	8	3	56	21	+35	65	
3	FK Yangiyer	30	19	4	7	66	35	+31	61	
4	FC Erkurgan	30	19	3	8	63	44	+19	60	
5	Xorazm FK Urganch	30	16	8	6	52	26	+26	56	
6	FC NBU Asia	30	14	6	10	52	35	+17	48	
7	Mash'al Akademiya	30	13	5	12	42	45	-3	44	
8	Imkon Oltiariq	30	12	4	14	39	50	-11	40	
9	Dynamo Ghallakor	30	12	3	15	42	62	-20	39	
10	Jaykhun	30	11	4	15	35	42	-7	37	
11	Registon	30	10	2	18	40	48	-8	32	
12	Surkhon-2011	30	8	4	18	34	55	-21	28	
13	Bunyodkor-2	30	7	5	17	28	46	-18	27	
14	FK Khiva	30	7	4	19	33	73	-50	25	
15	FK Kosonsoy	30	7	3	20	22	71	-49	24	
16	Oqtepa	30	6	2	22	25	68	-43	20	

== Top goalscorers ==
#	Scorer	Goals (Pen.)	Team
1	(Uzbekistan) Zaynitdin Tadjiyev	30	Lokomotiv
2	(Ukraine) Arsen Manasyan	29	Lokomotiv
3	(Uzbekistan) Dilshod Umarkhanov	24	FK Yangiyer
3	(Uzbekistan) Vladimir Gavrilov	24	Xorazm FK Urganch

Last updated: 1 November 2011
Source: Uzbekistan First League
