= 2017 Uzbekistan First League =

Uzbekistan First League
- Season: 2017

The 2017 Uzbekistan First League was the 26th season of second level football in Uzbekistan since its independence in 1992. FK Yangiyer, Istiqlol Fergana, Neftchi Termez and Ghallakor-Barsa were promoted from the Second League. The draw was held on 1 February 2017 and first match was 1 April 2017.

== Teams and locations ==
Location of the 2017 First League teams

Team	Location	Stadium	Stadium capacity
Andijan	Andijan	Soghlom Avlod Stadium	18,360
Ghallakor-Barsa	Gallaorol	Gallaorol Stadium	
Istiqlol	Fergana	Istiqlol Stadium	
Khotira-79	Uychi	Uychi Stadium	
Lokomotiv BFK	Tashkent		
Mash'al-2	Muborak	Bahrom Vafoev Stadium	10,000
Nasaf-2	Qarshi		
NBU Osiyo	Tashkent	NBU Stadium	9,100
Norin	Khakkulabad	Khakkulabad Stadium	
Nuravshon	Bukhoro	Nuravshon Stadium	
Orol Nukus	Nukus	Turon Stadium	9,300
Sementchi	Kuvasoy	Kuvasoy Stadium	
Surkhon	Termez	Alpamish Stadium	6,000
Uz-Dong-Ju	Andijan	Soghlom Avlod Stadium	18,360
Xorazm	Urganch	Xorazm Stadium	12,000
Yozyovon Lochinlari	Yozyovon	Yozyovon Stadium	
Yangiyer	Yangiyer	Yangiyer Stadium	6,000
Zaamin	Jizzakh Province	Zaamin Stadium	4,000

== League table ==
Pos	Team	Pld	W	D	L	GF	GA	GD	Pts	Promotion, qualification or relegation
1	Sementchi	34	27	4	3	97	22	+75	85	
2	Istiqlol	34	23	4	7	67	31	+36	73	
3	Andijon	34	21	9	4	73	32	+41	72	
4	Surkhon	34	18	6	10	57	32	+25	60	
5	Norin	34	18	6	10	58	51	+7	60	
6	NBU Osiyo	34	18	5	11	59	46	+13	59	
7	Mashʼal-2	34	16	6	12	65	48	+17	54	
8	Zaamin	34	15	5	14	48	50	−2	50	
9	Khorazm	34	13	8	13	52	52	0	47	
10	Lokomotiv-BFK	34	11	8	15	51	68	−17	41	
11	Yangiyer	34	10	10	14	51	57	−6	40	
12	Yozyovon	34	12	3	19	46	67	−21	39	
13	Orol	34	10	7	17	55	72	−17	37	
14	Nasaf-2	34	10	4	20	46	60	−14	34	
15	Uz-Dong-Ju	34	9	6	19	40	60	−20	33	Qualification to relegation play-offs
16	Ghallakor-Barsa	34	8	5	21	40	75	−35	29	Qualification to relegation play-offs
17	Khotira-79	34	8	4	22	51	105	−54	28	Relegation
18	Nurafshon	34	7	4	23	36	64	−28	25	Relegation

Source: Soccerway

== Top goalscorers ==
1. Shakhzod Ubaydullayev - Mashʼal-2 32 Goals
2. Abdul Aziz Yusupov- Sementchi 22 Goals
3. Orifkhoja Abdukholikov - NBU Osiyo 22 Goals
4. Dostonbek Toshmatov - Zaamin 17 Goals
5. Akmal Abdurahmanov - Surkhon Termez 15 Goals
