= 2012 Uzbekistan Cup =

O'zbekiston Kubogi 2012
Tournament details
- Country: Uzbekistan
- Teams: 37

Final positions
- Champions: FC Bunyodkor
- Runners-up: Nasaf Qarshi

The 2012 Uzbekistan Cup was the 20th season of the annual Uzbek football Cup competition. The Cup draw was held on January 25, 2012 in Tashkent.

The competition started on 23 March 2012 and ended on 30 November 2012 with the final at the Pakhtakor Markaziy Stadium in Tashkent. FC Pakhtakor are the defending champions.

The cup winner were guaranteed a place in the 2013 AFC Champions League.

== Calendar ==
Round	Date	Fixtures	Clubs	Notes
First round	23 March 2012	5	37 → 32	
Round of 32	29–31 March 2012	16	32 → 16	Clubs participating in Uzbek League and First League gain entry.
Round of 16	24–25 May 2012; 5, 9 July 2012	8	16 → 8	
Quarterfinals	8–9, 25 July 2012; 29 July 2012	4	8 → 4	
Semifinals	22 August 2012; 25 November 2012	2	4 → 2	
Final	30 November 2012	1	2 → 1	

== First round ==
Home team	Score	Away team	
Chust-Pakhtakor	3-0*	Lokomotiv BFK	Winner 1
Oqtepa Tashkent	0-3*	Pakhtakor-2 Tashkent	Winner 2
Nasaf-2	1-0	Zaamin	Winner 3
Neftchi Khamza	0-2	FK Kosonsoy	Winner 4
Yuzhanin Navoi	1-0	Buxoro-2	Winner 5

Note:

- Chust-Pakhtakor and FC Pakhtakor-2 are awarded by 3-0 win over their opponents Lokomotiv BFK, Oqtepa Tashkent

== Bracket ==
Round of 32; March 29–31, 2012
NBU Osiyo	0
Nasaf Qarshi	3
FK Guliston	2
FK Orol Nukus	1
Chust-Pakhtakor	1
Metallurg Bekabad	2
Sogdiana Jizzakh	2
FC Pakhtakor-2	1
FK Yangiyer	0(2)
Dynamo Samarkand	0(4)
Xorazm FK Urganch	1
FK Buxoro	3
Mash'al Akademiya	0
Lokomotiv Tashkent	1
FC Yoshlik	1(4)
Neftchi Farg'ona	1(5)
Nasaf-2	0
FC Bunyodkor	5
FK Khiva	0
FC Shurtan Guzar	2
Surkon-2011	1(4)
Mash'al Mubarek	1(5)
FK Kosonsoy	0
Qizilqum Zarafshon	4
Dynamo Ghallakor	0
FK Andijan	5
Registon	0
Olmaliq FK	1
FC Bunyodkor-2	1
Navbahor Namangan	3
Yuzhanin Navoi	1
FC Pakhtakor	2

Round of 16; May 24–25, 2012; July 5, 9, 2012
Nasaf Qarshi	6	2	8
FK Guliston	1	0	1
Metallurg Bekabad	3	3	6
Sogdiana Jizzakh	1	2	3
Dynamo Samarkand	1	0	1
FK Buxoro	2	0	2
Lokomotiv Tashkent	2	2	4
Neftchi Farg'ona	1	3	4
FC Bunyodkor	2	1	3
FC Shurtan Guzar	0	0	0
Mash'al Mubarek	2	2	4
Qizilqum Zarafshon	1	0	1
FK Andijan	3	1	4
Olmaliq FK	1	2	3
Navbahor Namangan	1	1	2
FC Pakhtakor	2	1	3

Quarterfinals; July 8–9, 25, 2012; July 29, 2012
Nasaf Qarshi	1	4	5
Metallurg Bekabad	2	2	4
FK Buxoro	2	0	2(7)
Lokomotiv Tashkent	0	2	2(6)
FC Bunyodkor	3	0	3
Mash'al Mubarek	0	0	0
FK Andijan	1	0	1
FC Pakhtakor	2	2	4

Semifinals; August 22, 2012; November 25, 2012
Nasaf Qarshi	2	3	5
FK Buxoro	0	3	3
FC Bunyodkor	1	3	4
FC Pakhtakor	1	1	2

Final; November 30, 2012
Nasaf Qarshi	0
FC Bunyodkor	3

== Round of 32 ==
The one leg matches were played on 29–31 March.

Team 1	Score	Team 2
NBU Osiyo	0-3	Nasaf Qarshi
FK Guliston	2-1	FK Orol Nukus
Chust-Pakhtakor	1-2	Metallurg Bekabad
Sogdiana Jizzakh	2-1	FC Pakhtakor-2
FK Yangiyer	0-0 (2-4 pen)	Dynamo Samarkand
Xorazm FK Urganch	1-3	FK Buxoro
Mash'al Akademiya	0-1	Lokomotiv Tashkent
FC Yoshlik	1-1 (4-5 pen)	Neftchi Farg'ona
Nasaf-2	0-5	FC Bunyodkor
FK Khiva	0-2	FC Shurtan Guzar
Surkhon-2011	1-1 (4-5 pen)	Mash'al Mubarek
FK Kosonsoy	0-4	Qizilqum Zarafshon
Dynamo Ghallakor	0-5	FK Andijan
Registon	0-1	Olmaliq FK
FC Bunyodkor-2	1-3	Navbahor Namangan
Yuzhanin Navoi	1-2	FC Pakhtakor

== Round of 16 ==
The sixteen winners from the Round of 32 were drawn into eight two-legged ties.

Team 1	Agg.	Team 2	1st leg	2nd leg
Andijan	4−3	Olmaliq	3-1	1-2
Nasaf Qarshi	8-1	Guliston	6-1	2-0
Metallurg Bekabad	6-3	Sogdiana Jizzakh	3-1	3-2
Mash'al Mubarek	4-1	Qizilqum Zarafshon	2-1	2-0
Navbahor Namangan	2−3	Pakhtakor	1-2	1-1
Dynamo Samarkand	1-2	Buxoro	1-2	0-0
Bunyodkor	3-0	Shurtan Guzar	2-0	1-0
Lokomotiv Tashkent	4−4	Neftchi Farg'ona	2-1	2-3

== Quarter-final ==
Team 1	Agg.	Team 2	1st leg	2nd leg
Andijan	1−4	Pakhtakor	1−2	0−2
Metallurg Bekabad	4−5	Nasaf Qarshi	2−1	2−4
Bunyodkor	3−0	Mash'al Mubarek	3−0	0−0
FK Buxoro	2−2; 7-6p	Lokomotiv Tashkent	2−0	0−2

== Semi-final ==
Team 1	Agg.	Team 2	1st leg	2nd leg
Nasaf Qarshi	5-3	FK Buxoro	2-0	3-3
FC Bunyodkor	4-2	FC Pakhtakor	1-1	3-1

== Final ==
Team 1	Score	Team 2
FC Bunyodkor	3-0	Nasaf Qarshi
