= 2012 Uzbekistan First League =

Uzbekistan First League
- Season: 2012
- Champions: Sogdiana Jizzakh
- Promoted: Sogdiana Jizzakh; Guliston
- Top goalscorer: 26 goals Khurshid Yuldoshev

The 2012 Uzbekistan First League was the 21st season of 2nd level football in Uzbekistan since 1992. It is split in an Eastern and Western zone, each featuring 12 teams.

== Teams and locations ==
Locations of the 2012 Uzbekistan First League Teams

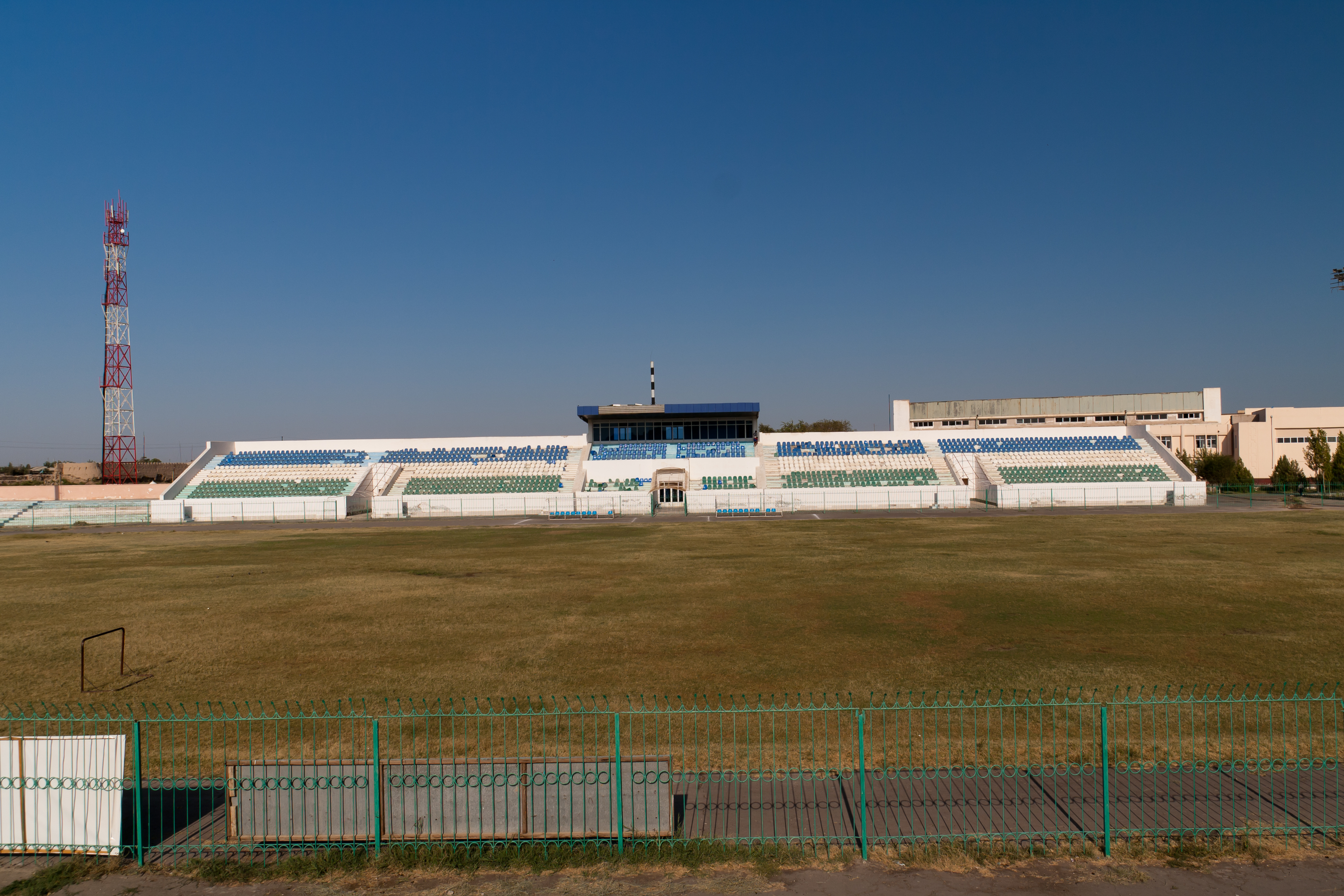
Stadium of FK Khiva

Team	Location	Stadium	Stadium capacity
FK Atlaschi	Margilan		
Bunyodkor-2	Chirchiq	Chirchiq Stadium	6,000
FK Bukhoro-2	Bukhoro		
Chust-Pakhtakor	Chust		
FC Yoshlik	Koson		
Ghallakor-Avtomobilchi	Ghallaorol		
FK Guliston	Guliston		
FK Khiva	Khiva	Spartak Stadium	8,000
FK Kosonsoy	Kosonsoy		
Mash'al Akademiya	Muborak		
Nasaf-2	Qarshi		
NBU Osiyo	Tashkent		
Neftchi Khamza	Fergana Province		
Oqtepa	Tashkent		
FK Orol Nukus	Nukus		9,300
Pakhtakor-2	Tashkent		
Kokand 1912	Kokand		
Registon	Samarkand		
Surkhon-2011	Termez		
Sogdiana Jizzakh	Jizzakh	Jizzakh Stadium	9,000
Xorazm FK Urganch	Urganch	Xorazm Stadium	12,000
FK Yangiyer	Yangiyer		
Yuzhanin	Navoi		
Zaamin	Jizzakh Province		

Note: In 2012 season Dynamo Ghallakor renamed to Ghallakor-Avtomobilchi, Jaykhun Nukus to FK Orol Nukus, Bunyodkor Qo'qon 1912 to Qo'qon 1912 and FC Erkurgan to FC Yoshlik

== Competition format ==
League consists of two regional groups: zone "East" and "West". The season comprises two phases. The first phase consists of a regular home-and-away schedule: each team plays the other teams twice. The top eight teams of the first phase from each zone will be merged in one tournament and compete for the championship. The bottom four teams of each zone after first phase will play each other to remain in first league.

The draw of the 2012 season was held on 29 February 2012.

First League joined Bukhoro-2, Neftchi Khamza, Yuzhanin Navoi, Zaamin from Second League, Lokomotiv BFK and Pakhtakor-2. Imkon-Oltiariq club is replaced by Qo'qon 1912 (former Bunyodkor Qo'qon 1912) and Lokomotiv BFK by FK Atlaschi because of lack of the financial support.

FC Yoshlik is replaced in 2nd phase of championship by FK Registon because of club's debts to its players and coaching staff.

On August 29, 2012 Yuzhanin Navoi renamed to Zarafshon Navoi.

== First phase ==
=== Zone "East" ===
Pos	Team	Pld	W	D	L	GF	GA	GF	Pts	Qualification or relegation
1	FK Guliston	22	16	3	3	56	25	+31	51	Promotion to the 2nd phase of championship
2	FK Yangiyer	22	13	3	6	42	25	+17	42	.
3	Oqtepa	22	14	0	8	49	48	+1	42	.
4	NBU Osiyo	22	10	6	6	36	28	+8	38	.
5	Chust-Pakhtakor	22	11	1	10	29	32	-3	34	.
6	Neftchi Khamza	22	10	3	10	31	31	0	33	.
7	FK Kosonsoy	22	10	3	10	31	32	-1	33	.
8	Kokand 1912	22	9	5	8	35	29	+6	32	.
9	Pakhtakor-2 Chilanzar	22	9	3	10	37	30	+7	30	.
10	Bunyodkor-2	22	5	2	15	21	40	-19	17	.
11	Zaamin	22	5	1	16	26	46	-20	16	.
12	FK Atlaschi	22	5	0	17	20	47	-27	15	.

=== Top goalscorers ===
#	Scorer	Goals (Pen.)	Team
1	(Uzbekistan) Dmitriy Kraev	14	Oqtepa
2	(Uzbekistan) Maruf Akhmedjanov	13	Oqtepa
2	(Uzbekistan) Abdulatif Abduqodirov	13	NBU Osiyo

Last updated: 11 July 2012
Source: Uzbekistan First League

=== Zone "West" ===
Pos	Team	Pld	W	D	L	GF	GA	GF	Pts	Qualification or relegation
1	Sogdiana Jizzakh	22	19	2	1	54	18	+36	59	Promotion to the 2nd phase of championship
2	Yuzhanin Navoi	22	12	4	6	29	22	+7	40	.
3	Xorazm FK Urganch	22	11	5	6	27	18	+9	38	.
4	FK Khiva	22	11	4	7	37	27	+10	37	.
5	Nasaf-2	22	12	1	9	41	31	+10	37	.
6	Ghallakor-Avtomobilchi	22	10	0	12	35	39	-4	30	.
7	Bukhoro-2	22	9	2	11	29	34	-5	29	.
8	FC Yoshlik	22	8	4	10	32	45	-13	28	.
9	Surkhon-2011	22	7	6	9	24	25	-1	27	.
10	Registon	22	8	3	11	26	35	-9	27	.
11	Mash'al Akademiya	22	6	0	16	22	29	-7	18	.
12	FK Orol Nukus	22	2	3	17	18	50	-32	9	.

=== Top goalscorers ===
#	Scorer	Goals (Pen.)	Team
1	(Uzbekistan) Zokhir Kuziboyev	13	Nasaf-2
1	(Uzbekistan) Isroil Tursunov	13	FK Khiva
1	(Uzbekistan) Hurshid Yuldoshev	13	Sogdiana Jizzakh

Last updated: 11 July 2012
Source: Uzbekistan First League

== Second phase ==
=== Championship group ===
==== Table before start ====
League table before start of second phase of championship

Pos	Team	Pld	W	D	L	GF	GA	GF	Pts	Qualification or relegation
1	Sogdiana Jizzakh	14	12	1	1	36	12	+24	37	Promotion to Uzbek League
2	FK Guliston	14	9	3	2	34	17	+17	30	.
3	Oqtepa	14	8	0	6	29	31	-2	24	.
4	FK Yangiyer	14	7	2	5	26	18	+8	23	.
5	FK Khiva	14	6	2	6	23	18	+5	20	.
6	Yuzhanin Navoi	14	6	2	6	15	17	-2	20	.
7	Nasaf-2	14	6	1	7	25	21	+4	19	.
8	Kokand 1912	14	5	4	5	22	19	+3	19	.
9	Xorazm FK Urganch	14	5	4	5	16	16	0	19	.
10	Neftchi	14	5	3	6	18	20	-2	18	.
11	NBU Osiyo	14	3	6	5	19	22	-3	15	.
12	Ghallakor-Avtomobilchi	14	5	0	9	23	28	-5	15	.
13	FK Kosonsoy	14	4	3	7	18	26	-8	15	.
14	Bukhoro-2	14	4	2	8	18	30	-12	14	.
15	Chust-Pakhtakor	14	4	1	9	12	25	-13	13	.
16	Registon	14	3	1	10	14	26	-12	10	replaced FC Yoshlik

==== League table ====
The last day matches were played on 30 October 2012. Club's end-season standing after finish of second phase of championship.

As of 31 October 2012

Pos	Team	Pld	W	D	L	GF	GA	GF	Pts	Qualification or relegation
1	Sogdiana Jizzakh	30	22	1	7	71	40	+31	67	Promotion to Uzbek League
2	FK Guliston	30	20	5	5	69	41	+28	65	.
3	NBU Osiyo	30	16	8	6	50	34	+16	56	.
4	FK Yangiyer	30	16	5	9	56	28	+28	53	.
5	Nasaf-2	30	15	3	12	68	47	+21	48	.
6	Zarafshon Navoi	30	14	5	11	40	35	+5	47	.
7	Xorazm FK Urganch	30	13	6	11	41	35	+6	45	.
8	Oqtepa	30	15	0	15	67	62	+5	45	.
9	Kokand 1912	30	12	8	10	45	43	+2	44	.
10	FK Khiva	30	11	3	16	40	51	-11	36	.
11	Neftchi	30	10	4	16	45	61	-16	34	.
12	Registon	30	10	3	17	41	48	-7	33	replaced FC Yoshlik
13	Ghallakor-Avtomobilchi	30	10	2	18	39	62	-23	32	.
14	Bukhoro-2	30	9	4	17	39	61	-22	31	.
15	FK Kosonsoy	30	8	3	19	37	62	-25	27	.
16	Chust-Pakhtakor	30	7	4	19	23	62	-39	25	.

Source: soccerway: Uzbekistan First League

=== Top goalscorers ===
#	Scorer	Goals (Pen.)	Team
1	(Uzbekistan) Khurshid Yuldoshev	26	Sogdiana Jizzakh
2	(Uzbekistan) Zokhir Kuziboyev	25	Nasaf-2
3	(Uzbekistan) Maruf Akhmedjanov	23	Oqtepa
4	(Uzbekistan) Azamat Allaniyazov	22	Nasaf-2
5	(Uzbekistan) Abdulatif Abduqodirov	22	NBU Osiyo
6	(Uzbekistan) Dmitriy Kraev	20	Oqtepa/Xorazm FK Urganch
7	(Uzbekistan) Isroil Tursunov	19	FK Khiva
8	(Uzbekistan) Qahramon Bahodirov	18	Registon

Last updated: 31 October 2012
Source: Uzbekistan First League
