= 2010 Uzbekistan First League =

Uzbekistan First League
- Season: 2011
- Champions: FK Buxoro
- Promoted: FK Buxoro; Sogdiana Jizzakh
- Top goalscorer: 27 goals Abdulatif Juraev

The 2010 Uzbekistan First League was the 19th season of 2nd level football in Uzbekistan since 1992.

== Teams and locations ==
Locations of the 2010 Uzbekistan First League Teams

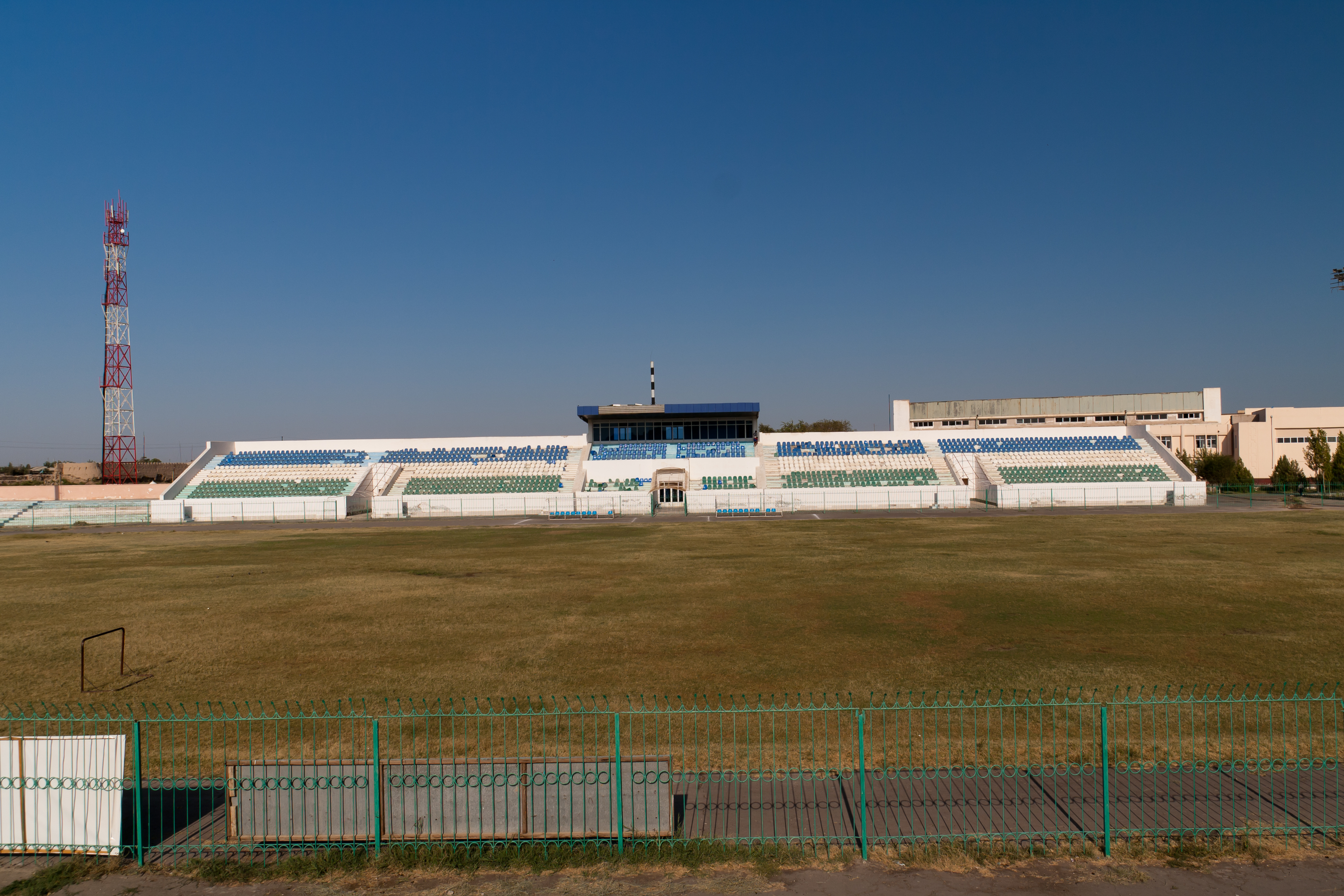
Stadium of FK Khiva

Team	Location	Stadium	Stadium capacity
FK Buxoro	Bukhoro	Bukhoro Sport Majmuasi	22,700
Sogdiana Jizzakh	Jizzakh	Jizzakh Stadium	9,000
FK Guliston	Guliston	12,400	
Zarafshon NCZ	Zarafshan		
FK Khiva	Khiva		
Lokomotiv BFK	Tashkent		
Imkon Oltiariq	Altyaryk		
Dynamo Ghallakor	Ghallaorol		
Shurchi-Lochin	Shurchi		
Mash'al Akademiya	Muborak		
Oqtepa	Tashkent		
FK Kosonsoy	Kosonsoy		
Chust-Pakhtakor	Chust		
FC Spartak Tashkent	Tashkent		
Durmon-Sport	Tashkent		
NBU Osiyo	Tashkent		

== Competition format ==
League consists of 16 teams which play on regular home-and-away schedule: each team plays the other teams twice. The top two teams of the promote to Uzbek top league.

== League table ==
The final standings of teams after last matchday. FK Buxoro and Sogdiana Jizzakh promoted to Oliy Liga.

Pos	Team	Pld	W	D	L	GF	GA	GF	Pts	Qualification or relegation
1	FK Buxoro	30	24	2	4	71	21	+50	74	Promotion to Uzbek League
2	Sogdiana Jizzakh	30	21	3	6	57	21	+36	66	.
3	FK Guliston	30	18	3	9	56	31	+25	57	
4	Zarafshon NCZ	30	16	5	9	53	38	+15	53	
5	FK Khiva	30	16	4	10	52	48	+9	52	
6	Lokomotiv BFK	30	14	6	10	33	23	+10	48	
7	Imkon Oltiariq	30	14	4	12	42	39	+3	46	
8	Dynamo Ghallakor	30	14	4	12	29	27	+2	46	
9	Shurchi-Lochin	30	12	7	11	37	42	-5	39	
10	Mash'al Akademiya	30	11	8	11	42	29	+13	41	
11	Oqtepa	30	13	2	15	48	49	-1	41	
12	FK Kosonsoy	30	9	5	16	30	63	-33	32	
13	Chust-Pakhtakor	30	7	5	18	32	68	-36	26	
14	FC Spartak Tashkent	30	6	7	17	23	38	-15	25	
15	Durmon-Sport	30	7	1	22	22	57	-35	22	
16	NBU Osiyo	30	4	2	24	25	64	-39	14	

== Top goalscorers ==
#	Scorer	Goals (Pen.)	Team
1	(Uzbekistan) Abdulatif Juraev	27	Chust-Pakhtakor/FK Buxoro
2	(Uzbekistan) Bahodir Pardaev	26	Sogdiana Jizzakh

Last updated: October 28, 2010
Source: Uzbekistan First League
