= 2009 Uzbekistan Second League =

Uzbekistan Second League
- Season: 2011

Uzbekistan Second League is the third highest football league in Uzbekistan. The league is headed by UFF.

== Members of Uzbekistan Second League 2009 ==
Team	Location	Stadium	Stadium capacity
ADU	Andijan Province		
FC Erkurgan	Koson		
Dinamo Nukus	Nukus		
Dinamo	Samarqand Province		
FK Guliston	Guliston	12,400	
FK Khiva	Khiva		
FK Kosonsoy	Kosonsoy		
Lokomotiv BFK	Tashkent		
Lokomotiv BFK Kogon	Kogon		
Metallurg	Tashkent Province		

== League format ==
In the second phase the league split into two groups each featuring five teams. The winner and runner-up of each group promote to First League

== Second phase, season 2009 ==
FK Khiva, Lokomotiv BFK Tashkent, FK Guliston and FK Kosonsoy are promoted to First Division

=== Group A ===
Pos	Team	Pld	W	D	L	GF	GA	GF	Pts	Qualification or relegation
1	FK Khiva	4	3	1	0	13	4	+9	10	Promotion to the First League
2	Lokomotiv BFK Tashkent	4	3	1	0	7	2	+5	10	.
3	Dinamo Nukus	4	2	0	2	8	9	-1	6	.
4	FC Erkurgan	4	1	0	3	3	6	-3	3	.
5	Lokomotiv BFK Kogon	4	0	0	4	4	14	-10	0	.

=== Group B ===
Pos	Team	Pld	W	D	L	GF	GA	GF	Pts	Qualification or relegation
1	FK Guliston	4	4	0	0	16	1	+15	12	Promotion to the First League
2	FK Kosonsoy	4	3	0	1	12	6	+6	9	.
3	Metallurg	4	2	0	2	7	8	-1	6	.
4	ADU	4	1	0	3	8	8	0	3	.
5	Dinamo	4	0	0	4	1	21	-20	0	.
