= 2009 Uzbekistan First League =

Uzbekistan First League
- Season: 2009
- Champions: Bunyodkor Qo'qon 1912
- Promoted: Bunyodkor Qo'qon 1912
- Top goalscorer: 20 goals Aziz Asimov, Mansur Abdullaev

The 2009 Uzbekistan First League was the 18th season of 2nd level football in Uzbekistan since 1992.

== Teams and locations ==
Locations of the 2009 Uzbekistan First League teams

Team	Location	Stadium	Stadium capacity
Bunyodkor Qo'qon 1912	Kokand		
Mash'al-Sport	Mubarek		
Zarafshon NCZ	Zarafshan		
Dynamo Qarshi	Qarshi		
Jaykhun	Nukus		
FC Spartak Tashkent	Tashkent		
Shurchi-Lochin	Shurchi		
Dynamo Hamkor	Termez		
Dynamo Ghallakor	Ghallaorol		
NBU Osiyo	Tashkent		
Shaykhontohur	Tashkent		
Nasaf-2	Qarshi		
Rash Milk	Shakhrikhon		
Mehnat	Yaypan		

== Competition format ==
League consists of 14 teams which play on regular home-and-away schedule: each team plays the other teams twice. The top two teams of the promote to Uzbek top league.

== League table ==
The final standings of teams after last matchday.

Pos	Team	Pld	W	D	L	GF	GA	GF	Pts	Qualification or relegation
1	Bunyodkor Qo'qon 1912	26	18	4	4	54	22	+28	58	Promotion to Uzbek League
2	Mash'al-Sport	26	17	6	3	60	19	+41	57	
3	Zarafshon NCZ	26	16	3	7	54	40	+10	51	
4	Dynamo Qarshi	26	14	3	9	39	31	+8	45	
5	Jaykhun	26	13	4	9	41	48	-7	43	
6	FC Spartak Tashkent	26	12	6	8	36	16	+20	42	
7	Shurchi-Lochin	26	12	3	11	41	30	+11	39	
8	Dynamo-Hamkor	26	12	1	13	30	41	-11	37	
9	Dynamo Ghallakor	26	10	3	13	37	49	-12	33	
10	NBU Osiyo	26	9	5	12	43	36	+7	32	
11	Shaykhontohur	26	7	3	16	41	73	-32	24	
12	Nasaf-2	26	6	4	16	25	37	-12	22	
13	Rash Milk	26	4	8	14	24	59	-35	20	
14	Mehnat	26	2	7	17	23	47	-24	13	

== Top goalscorers ==
#	Scorer	Goals (Pen.)	Team
1	(Uzbekistan) Aziz Asimov	20	NBU Osiyo
1	(Uzbekistan) Mansur Abdullaev	20	Zarafshon
3	(Uzbekistan) Dmitriy Kraev	15	Spartak
