= 2015 Uzbekistan First League =

Uzbekistan First League
- Season: 2015
- Champions: Obod
- Top goalscorer: Alisher Azizov (26 goals)

The 2015 Uzbekistan First League was the 24th season of second level football in Uzbekistan since independence in 1992. It is split in an eastern and western zone, each featuring 12 teams. As of end of the season Obod won championship and promoted to Uzbek League for 2016 season. The runners-up, Oqtepa after lost by 1-2 in one leg relegation/play-off match against Sogdiana Jizzakh on 25 November 2015 remained in First League.

== Teams and locations ==
Locations of the 2015 Uzbekistan First League Teams

Team	Location	Stadium	Stadium capacity
Alanga	Koson	Koson Stadium	
Bunyodkor-2	Tashkent	JAR Stadium	8,460
Chust-Pakhtakor	Chust		
FK Gijduvan	Gijduvan	Gijduvan Stadium	
FK Guliston	Guliston	Guliston Stadium	12,400
Yozyovon Lochinlari	Yozyovon	Yozyovon Stadium	
FK Zaamin	Jizzakh Province	Zaamin Stadium	4,000
Khotira-79	Namangan Province		
Istiqlol	Pskent	Tukimachi Stadium (Tashkent)	
Kosonsoy	Kosonsoy	Kosonsoy Stadium	30,000
Lokomotiv BFK	Tashkent		
Mash'al-2	Muborak	Bahrom Vafoev Stadium	10,000
NBU Osiyo	Tashkent	NBU Stadium	9,100
Obod	Tashkent	Obod Stadium	
Oqtepa	Tashkent	Oq-Tepa Stadium	2,000
Orol Nukus	Nukus	Turon Stadium	9,300
Sementchi	Kuvasoy	Kuvasoy Stadium	
Pakhtakor-2	Tashkent	Pakhtakor Stadium	33,000
Uz-Dong-Ju	Andijan		
Xorazm	Urganch	Xorazm Stadium	12,000

== Competition format ==
League consists of two regional groups: conference "East" and "West". The season comprises two phases. The first phase consists of a regular home-and-away schedule: each team plays the other teams twice. The top eight teams of the first phase from each zone will be merged in one tournament and compete for the championship. The bottom four teams of each zone after first phase will play relegation matches to remain in first league.

The draw of the 2015 season was held on 18 February 2015. First League joined FK Yozyovon, Sementchi Kuvasoy. Each regional zones comprises 10 teams. The Tashkent teams Obod, FC Istiqlol and Lokomotiv BFK to play in "West" zone.

== First phase ==
=== Zone "East" ===
Pos	Team	Pld	W	D	L	GF	GA	GF	Pts.	Qualification or relegation
1	Oqtepa	18	13	2	3	34	14	+20	41	Promotion to the 2nd phase of championship
2	Uz-Dong-Ju	18	9	4	5	26	17	+9	31	.
3	NBU Osiyo	18	9	4	5	24	19	+5	31	.
4	Khotira-79	18	9	1	8	25	36	-12	28	.
5	Kosonsoy	18	8	3	7	33	31	+2	27	.
6	Sementchi Kuvasoy	18	6	5	7	35	23	+12	23	.
7	FK Yozyovon Lochinlari	18	6	3	9	21	31	+2	21	.
8	Pakhtakor-2	18	4	8	6	24	26	-10	20	.
9	Bunyodkor-2	18	5	1	12	23	38	-16	16	.
10	Chust-Pakhtakor	18	4	5	11	26	39	-12	15	.

=== Zone "West" ===
Pos	Team	Pld	W	D	L	GF	GA	GF	Pts	Qualification or relegation
1	Obod	18	13	4	1	55	13	+42	43	Promotion to the 2nd phase of championship
2	Xorazm	18	12	3	3	27	13	+14	39	.
3	FK Zaamin	18	11	4	3	40	12	+28	37	.
4	Nasaf-2	18	8	5	5	35	24	+11	29	.
5	Lokomotiv BFK	18	7	4	7	25	26	-1	25	.
6	Mash'al-2	18	7	3	8	22	22	+0	24	.
7	Orol Nukus	18	7	2	9	20	24	-4	23	.
8	FK Gijduvon	18	4	3	11	18	34	-16	15	.
9	FK Sherdor	18	4	2	12	12	27	-15	14	.
10	Alanga Koson	18	1	2	15	10	69	-59	5	.

== Second phase ==
=== Championship round ===
Final standings The last matchday matches were played on 7 November 2015

Pos	Team	Pld	W	D	L	GF	GA	GF	Pts.	Qualification or relegation
1	Obod	30	20	5	5	98	37	+61	65	Promotion to Uzbek League
2	Oqtepa	30	20	4	6	63	22	+41	64	Qualification to Promotion play-offs
3	Uz-Dong-Ju	30	16	8	6	51	27	+24	56	.
4	Sementchi Kuvasoy	30	15	7	8	70	34	+36	52	.
5	FK Zaamin	30	15	7	8	57	39	+18	52	.
6	NBU Osiyo	30	15	5	10	46	32	+14	50	.
7	Xorazm	30	15	4	11	39	30	0	49	.
8	Yozyovon Lochinlari	30	12	7	11	46	52	-6	43	.
9	Pakhtakor-2	30	9	9	12	48	58	-10	36	.
10	Nasaf-2	30	9	8	13	37	54	-17	35	.
11	Kosonsoy	30	10	4	16	46	58	-12	34	.
12	Mash'al-2	30	9	6	15	36	45	-9	33	.
13	Orol Nukus	30	9	4	17	25	50	-25	31	.
14	Khotira-79	30	9	3	18	32	71	-39	30	.
15	Lokomotiv BFK	30	7	8	15	37	60	-23	29	Relegation to 2.League
16	FK Gijduvon	30	3	5	22	28	81	-53	14	.

Last updated: 7 November 2015
Source: Soccerway

=== Top goalscorers ===
#	Scorer	Team	Goals (Pen.)
1	(Uzbekistan) Alisher Azizov	Obod	26
