= 2013 Uzbekistan Cup =

O'zbekiston Kubogi 2013
Tournament details
- Country: Uzbekistan
- Teams: 38

Final positions
- Champions: Bunyodkor
- Runners-up: Nasaf Qarshi

Tournament statistics
- Top goal scorer: Oleksandr Pyschur (5)

The 2013 Uzbekistan Cup was the 21st season of the annual Uzbek football Cup competition. The Cup draw was held on February 25, 2013 in Tashkent.

The competition to start on March 24, 2013, and ends in September 25, 2013 with the final to be held at the Pakhtakor Markaziy Stadium in Tashkent. Bunyodkor are the defending champions.

The cup winner is guaranteed a place in the 2014 AFC Champions League.

== Calendar ==
Round	Date	Fixtures	Clubs	Notes
First round	March 24, 2013	6	38 → 26	
Round of 32	April 6–7, 2013	12	26 → 14	Clubs participating in Uzbek League and First League gain entry.
Round of 16	April 27–28, 2013; May 17–18, 2013	8	16 → 8	
Quarterfinals	July 8, 14, 2013; July 24–25, 2013	4	8 → 4	
Semifinals	July 30–31, 2013	2	4 → 2	
Final	September 25, 2013	1	2 → 1	

== First round ==
On March 22, 2013, Uzbek PFL authority announced changes of participants of 2013 Uzbek Cup. FK Khiva and Neftchi Tinchlik are replaced by Bunyodkor-2 and Bukhoro-2 because of lack of the financial support.

FK Khiva - Bukhoro-2, Kokand 1912 - Neftchi Tinchlik, FK Orol Nukus - Xorazm FK Urganch matches have been canceled. Bukhoro-2', Kokand 1912 and FK Orol Nukus qualified to the next round.

Home team	Score	Away team
Mash'al Mubarek	3 - 0	Spartak Bukhoro
FK Khiva		Bukhoro-2*
Ghallakor-Avtomobilchi	1 - 1 (pen.6 - 5)	Alanga Koson
Pakhtakor-2 Chilanzar	0 - 0 (pen. 4 - 5)	Lokomotiv BFK
Kokand 1912*		Neftchi Tinchlik
Hotira	0 - 3	FK Andijan
Registon	1 - 0	FK Zaamin
FK Orol Nukus*		Xorazm FK Urganch
Zarafshon Navoi	2 - 1	Sherdor
Istiqlol Tashkent	3 - 1	FK Yangiyer
NBU Osiyo	3 - 1	Oqtepa Tashkent
Chust-Pakhtakor	1 - 3	FK Kosonsoy

- Note: Bukhoro-2, Kokand 1912, FK Orol Nukus qualified to the next round.

== Bracket ==
Round of 32; April 6–7, 2013
Mash'al Mubarek	1
FK Buxoro	0
Bukhoro-2	0
Navbahor Namangan	1
Ghallakor-Avtomobilchi	1
Qizilqum Zarafshon	2
Lokomotiv BFK	1(9)
Metallurg Bekabad	1(10)
Kokand 1912	1
Sogdiana Jizzakh	0
FK Andijan	0
Lokomotiv Tashkent	1
Registon	1
Nasaf Qarshi	6
FK Orol Nukus	1
FC Shurtan Guzar	4
Zarafshon Navoi	0(3)
Neftchi Farg'ona	0(4)
Istiqlol Tashkent	4
FK Dinamo Samarqand	1
NBU Osiyo	0
FK Guliston	2
FK Kosonsoy	1
Olmaliq FK	2

Round of 16; April 27–28, 2013; May 17–18, 2013
Mash'al Mubarek	2	2	4
Navbahor Namangan	1	0	1
Qizilqum Zarafshon	4	3	7
Lokomotiv BFK	0	1	1
Kokand 1912	1	0	0
Lokomotiv Tashkent	2	2	4
Nasaf Qarshi	2	1	3
FC Shurtan Guzar	0	0	0
Neftchi Farg'ona	1	0	1
Istiqlol Toshkent	0	0	0
FK Guliston	2	1	3
Olmaliq FK	0	3	3

Quarterfinals; July 8, 14, 2013; July 24–25, 2013
Bunyodkor	1	2	3
Mash'al Mubarek	1	0	1
Qizilqum Zarafshon	1	0	1
Lokomotiv Tashkent	0	2	2
Nasaf Qarshi	2	3	5
Neftchi Farg'ona	0	1	1
FK Guliston	1	0	1
Pakhtakor	3	4	7

Semifinals; July 30–31, 2013
Bunyodkor	2	2	4
Lokomotiv Tashkent	2	0	2
Nasaf Qarshi	0	2	2
Pakhtakor	0	0	0

Final; September 25, 2013
Bunyodkor	2
Nasaf Qarshi	1

== Round of 32 ==
The one leg matches will be played on April 6–7.

Team 1	Score	Team 2
Mash'al Mubarek	1-0	FK Buxoro
Bukhoro-2	0-1	Navbahor Namangan
Ghallakor-Avtomobilchi	1-2	Qizilqum Zarafshon
Lokomotiv BFK	1-1 (pen.9-10)	Metallurg Bekabad
Kokand 1912	1-0	Sogdiana Jizzakh
FK Andijan	0-1	Lokomotiv Tashkent
Registon	1-6	Nasaf Qarshi
FK Orol Nukus	1-4	FC Shurtan Guzar
Zarafshon Navoi	1-1 (pen.3-4)	Neftchi Farg'ona
Istiqlol Tashkent	4-1	FK Dinamo Samarqand
NBU Osiyo	0-2	FK Guliston
FK Kosonsoy	1-2	Olmaliq FK

== Round of 16 ==
The sixteen winners from the Round of 32 were drawn into eight two-legged ties.

Team 1	Agg.	Team 2	1st leg	2nd leg
Mash'al Mubarek	4-1	Navbahor Namangan	2-1	2-0
Qizilqum Zarafshon	7-1	Lokomotiv BFK	4-0	3-1
Kokand 1912	1-4	Lokomotiv Tashkent	1-2	0-2
Nasaf Qarshi	3-0	FC Shurtan Guzar	2-0	1-0
Neftchi Farg'ona	1-0	Istiqlol Tashkent	1-0	0-0
FK Guliston	3-3(a)	Olmaliq FK	2-0	1-3

== Quarterfinals ==
Team 1	Agg.	Team 2	1st leg	2nd leg
Mash'al Mubarek	1-3	Bunyodkor	1-1	0-2
Nasaf Qarshi	5-1	Neftchi Farg'ona	2-0	3-1
Qizilqum Zarafshon	1-2	Lokomotiv Tashkent	1-0	0-2
FK Guliston	1-7	Pakhtakor	1-3	0-4

== Semifinals ==
Team 1	Agg.	Team 2	1st leg	2nd leg
Bunyodkor	4-2	Lokomotiv Tashkent	2-2	2-0
Pakhtakor	0-2	Nasaf Qarshi	0-0	0-2

== Final ==
Team 1	Score	Team 2
FC Bunyodkor	2-1	Nasaf Qarshi
