= FC Sherdor =

- Full name: Football Club Sherdor
- Nickname(s): The Lions; Samarkandians; Blue-yellow
- Founded: 1990; 35 years ago
- Ground: Olympia Stadium (Samarkand)
- Capacity: 12,500
- Head coach: Bakhtiyor Sattorov
- League: Uzbekistan Pro League
- 2017: 2st
Home colours	Away colours

FC Sherdor (Uzbek: "Sherdor" futbol klubi / "Шердор" футбол клуби; Russian: Футбольный клуб "Шердор") – is an Uzbekistani football club from the city of Samarkand. Founded in 1990, revived in 2012. Participant of the Uzbekistan Pro League. In the 2017 season he participated in the Uzbekistan Second League. In this league was able to take first place and reach the league rank higher.

== History ==
It was founded in 1990. In 1990 he participated in the Second Lower League of the USSR Football League, and at the end of the season took the last 20th place and flew from the tournament. In that season the team was coached by Alexander Mosesov and Michael Ohanian half of the season, respectively. After departure from the Second lower League and the subsequent dissolution of the USSR and the USSR Championship, the club was disbanded.

It was revived in early 2012 and participated in the Uzbekistan Second League. In the first stage ff the Second League, the club participated in group B, and among the five teams participating in this group, took first place, gaining 10 points in four matches. Thus, Sherdor got the right to participate in the season 2013 in the Uzbekistan First League.

In his debut season in the First League, Sherdor was attended by average. In the first stage of the First League, the club participated in the group "West" and at the end of the first stage took fourth place among 12 clubs and retained the right to participate in the second stage of the League. The statistics of the team in the first stage of the League: 22 matches, 11 wins, 2 draws, 9 defeats and 35 points. In the second stage, at the end of the League Sherdor took the ninth place among the 16. Statistics of the second final stage of the League: 30 matches, 12 wins, 3 draws, 15 defeats and 39 points. That year, Sherdor took part in the Uzbekistan Cup for the first time and finished it in the first round, losing to the Zarafshan Navoi with a score of 1:0.

In the second season in the Uzbekistan First League in 2014, Sherdor participated worse than in the previous season. In the first stage, the club also participated in the group "West" and at the end of the first stage took seventh place among 12 clubs and retained the right to participate in the second stage. Club statistics in the first stage of the League: 22 matches, 8 wins, 6 draws, 8 defeats and 30 points. In the second stage, at the end of the season took the penultimate fifteenth place but retained the right to participate in the First League next season, as in the second stage, the teams finishing in last place doesn't go to the Second League. Statistics of the second final stage of the League: 30 matches, 8 wins, 5 draws, 17 defeats and 29 points. In that year, Sherdor for the second time participated in the Uzbekistan Cup and finished him in the second round, winning Ghallakor with the score 3:0 and losing in the second round of the Andizhan with the score 3:5 on penalties (the match ended with the score 2:2).

2016 and 2017 seasons Sherdor participates in the Uzbekistan Second League.

== Club name history ==
1990	Football Club Sherdor
2012	Football Club Sherdor-Prestizh
2013—	Football Club Sherdor

== История выступлений ==
Season	League	Position	Cup
1990	USSR Lower Second League	20	Not to participate
1991—2011	Not exist		
2012	Uzbekistan Second League	1	Not to participate
2013	Uzbekistan First League	9	First round
2014	Uzbekistan First League	15	Second round
2015	Uzbekistan First League	9	First round
2016	Uzbekistan Second League	4	Not to participate
2017	Uzbekistan Second League	2	Not to participate

== Famous player ==
Many players in the Sherdor at different times were also players of the local Dinamo Samarkand. Below are the most famous players who played for Sherdor

- (Soviet Union) Oleg Solovyov
- (Soviet Union) Bakhodyr Rakhmanov
- (Soviet Union) Oleg Gorvits
- (Soviet Union) Kamo Gazarov
- (Soviet Union) Viktor Shustitsky
- (Soviet Union) Mikhail Fomin
- (Soviet Union) Farhod Taylyakov
- (Soviet Union) Tuychi Rahmatullaev
- (Soviet Union) Bakhtiyor Radjabov
- (Soviet Union) Evstafiy Popandopulo
- (Soviet Union) Zakir Narzullaev
- (Soviet Union) Elbek Musaev
- (Soviet Union) Vadim Zubkov
- (Soviet Union) Seyran Ghafarov
- (Soviet Union) Vitaly Beglaryan
- (Soviet Union) Alexander Babayan
- (Soviet Union) Suren Adamyan
- (Soviet Union) Boris Oganyan
- (Soviet Union) Suleyman Abdullaev
- (Uzbekistan) Sandjar Akramov
- (Uzbekistan) Shukhrat Murodov
- (Uzbekistan) Bakhtiyor Ochilov

== Head coaches ==
Period	Head coach
1990	(Soviet Union) Alexander Mosesov
1990	(Soviet Union) Mikhail Ohanyan
2012—2014	(Uzbekistan) Sayfullo Sharipov
2016—	(Uzbekistan) Bakhtiyor Sattorov

== See also ==
- FC Dinamo Samarkand
