= 2020 Uzbekistan First League =

- Season: 2020
- Champions: Yangiyer
- Relegated: Andijon-2 (First Round. Eastern Region); Zirabulak Narpay (First Round. Western Region); Yashnobod (Second Round. Eastern Region)
- Matches: 114
- Top goalscorer: Dilmurod Joʻraboyev (13 goals)
- Biggest home win: Aral Samali 7-0 Zirabuloq; 29 October 2020
- Biggest away win: Yashnobod 4-7 Chigʻatoy; 5 December 2020
- Highest scoring: Aral Samali 7-0 Zirabuloq; 29 October 2020
- Longest winning run: Yangiyer
- Longest losing run: Zirabulak
- Highest attendance: 237 people, Aral Samali 0-1 Chigʻatoy (5 December 2020)

The 2020 Uzbekistan First League (Uzbek: Futbol boʻyicha 2020-yilgi Oʻzbekiston Birinchi ligasi) was the 29th since its establishment. The competition started on September 10 and finished December 7, 2020. 2020 season was disrupted by COVID-19 pandemic worldwide. The first round of the season was played on 10 September 2020. The season was interrupted between rounds due to the pandemic. UzPFL reduced the fee to make things easier for teams.

== Teams and locations ==
Locations of the 2020 Uzbekistan First League Teams

| Club | Coach | Location | Stadium | Capacity | Kit sponsor | Shirt sponsor |
|---|---|---|---|---|---|---|
| Andijon-2 | | Andijan | | | | |
| Aral Samali | | Nukus | | | | |
| Bunyodkor Farm | | Tashkent | | | | |
| Chigatoy | | Chirchiq | | | | |
| G'ijduvon | | Gʻijduvon | | | | |
| Jizzakh-Bars | | Jizzakh | | | | |
| Lokomotiv-BFC | | Tashkent | | | | |
| Navbahor Farm | | Namangan | | | | |
| Pakhtakor Farm | | Tashkent | | | | |
| Pakhtakor-79 | | Tashkent | | | | |
| Rubin | | Tashkent | | | | |
| Yangiyer | | Yangiyer | | | | |
| Yashnabod | | Tashkent | | | | |
| Zirabuloq | | Samarqand | | | | |

== Tournament Schedule ==
=== First stage ===
==== Eastern Region. First Stage. ====
| Pos | Team | Pld | W | D | L | GF | GA | GD | Pts | Promotion, qualification or relegation |
|---|---|---|---|---|---|---|---|---|---|---|
| 1 | Rubin | 12 | 8 | 3 | 1 | 26 | 13 | +13 | 27 | Second stage upper six |
| 2 | Paxtakor Farm | 12 | 7 | 2 | 3 | 30 | 12 | +18 | 23 | Second stage upper six |
| 3 | Pakhtakor-79 | 12 | 6 | 2 | 4 | 22 | 18 | +4 | 20 | Second stage upper six |
| 4 | Navbahor-2 | 12 | 5 | 1 | 6 | 15 | 16 | −1 | 16 | Second stage lower six |
| 5 | Yashnobod | 12 | 4 | 2 | 6 | 14 | 24 | −10 | 14 | Second stage lower six |
| 6 | Lokomotiv BFK | 12 | 3 | 1 | 8 | 22 | 37 | −15 | 10 | Second stage lower six |
| 7 | Andijon-2 | 12 | 2 | 3 | 7 | 19 | 28 | −9 | 9 | Relegation to the Second League |

Updated to match(es) played on November 10, 2023. Source: Uzbekistan Professional Football League
Rules for classification: 1) Ochko; 2) Head-to-head points; 3) Head-to-head goal difference; 4) Head-to-head goals scored; 5) Goal difference; 6) Goals scored; .

==== Results ====
| Home \ Away | RUB | PAK | PAKH | NAV | YASH | LOK | AND |
|---|---|---|---|---|---|---|---|
| Rubin | — | 2–0 | 1–1 | 1–0 | 4–0 | 5–1 | 3–1 |
| Paxtakor Farm | 6–1 | — | 3–0 | 2–1 | 4–0 | 4–1 | 4–0 |
| Pakhtakor-79 | 0–1 | 0–3 | — | 1–0 | 2–1 | 3–1 | 3–3 |
| Navbahor-2 | 0–2 | 2–1 | 0–2 | — | 2–0 | 4–2 | 1–0 |
| Yashnobod | 1–1 | 0–0 | 3–2 | 1–0 | — | 4–2 | 3–1 |
| Lokomotiv BFK | 1–3 | 4–2 | 1–6 | 2–2 | 2–0 | — | 5–1 |
| Andijon II | 2–2 | 1–1 | 1–2 | 2–3 | 4–1 | 3–0 | — |

Updated to match(es) played on 10-noyabr 2020. Source: Championat.asia
Legend: Blue = home team win; Yellow = draw; Red = away team win.

==== Western region. First stage. ====
| Pos | Team | Pld | W | D | L | GF | GA | GD | Pts | Promotion, qualification or relegation |
|---|---|---|---|---|---|---|---|---|---|---|
| 1 | Yangiyer | 12 | 10 | 2 | 0 | 37 | 11 | +26 | 32 | Second stage upper six |
| 2 | Gʻijduvon | 12 | 6 | 1 | 5 | 26 | 20 | +6 | 19 | Second stage upper six |
| 3 | Bunyodkor-2 Farm | 12 | 5 | 3 | 4 | 25 | 18 | +7 | 18 | Second stage upper six |
| 4 | Chigʻatoy | 12 | 5 | 1 | 6 | 19 | 22 | −3 | 16 | Second stage lower six |
| 5 | Aral-samali | 12 | 4 | 3 | 5 | 24 | 23 | +1 | 15 | Second stage lower six |
| 6 | Jizzax-Bars | 12 | 2 | 4 | 6 | 12 | 19 | −7 | 10 | Second stage lower six |
| 7 | Zirabuloq | 12 | 3 | 0 | 9 | 11 | 41 | −30 | 9 | Relegato to Second League |

Updated to match(es) played on November 10, 2023. Source: Uzbekistan Professional Football League
Rules for classification: 1) Points; 2) Head-to-head points; 3) Head-to-head goal difference; 4) Head-to-head goals scored; 5) Goal difference; 6) Goals scored; .

| Home \ Away | YAN | GIJ | BUN | CHI | ARA | JIZ | ZIR |
|---|---|---|---|---|---|---|---|
| Yangiyer | — | 1–0 | 4–3 | 5–3 | 3–0 | 2–0 | 6–0 |
| Gʻijduvon | 1–2 | — | 1–1 | 2–1 | 3–1 | 3–1 | 3–1 |
| Bunyodkor-2 Farm | 1–2 | 3–1 | — | 1–0 | 1–1 | 3–1 | 4–0 |
| Chigʻatoy | 2–2 | 2–5 | 1–3 | — | 1–0 | 2–0 | 2–0 |
| Aral-samali | 1–5 | 4–3 | 4–3 | 0–1 | — | 1–1 | 7–0 |
| Jizzax-Bars | 0–0 | 0–2 | 0–0 | 4–2 | 1–1 | — | 2–0 |
| Zirabuloq | 0–5 | 3–2 | 3–2 | 0–2 | 1–4 | 3–2 | — |

Updated to match(es) played on November 10, 2020. Source: Championat.asia
Legend: Blue = home team win; Yellow = draw; Red = away team win.

The teams Andijan-2 from Andijan and Zirabulak from Samarkand, who took last place after the preliminary round, said goodbye to the tournament.

The top three teams from the Western and Eastern regions formed the top six. The remaining teams, who finished in the bottom six, continued to participate in the tournament.

In the second stage, the regions were merged.

=== Second stage ===
==== First League Second Round. Top Six Teams ====
| Pos | Team | Pld | W | D | L | GF | GA | GD | Pts | Promotion, qualification or relegation |
|---|---|---|---|---|---|---|---|---|---|---|
| 1 | Yangiyer | 5 | 5 | 0 | 0 | 13 | 3 | +10 | 15 | Promotion to the Pro League |
| 2 | Paxtakor-2 Farm | 5 | 4 | 0 | 1 | 10 | 4 | +6 | 12 | |
| 3 | Rubin | 5 | 3 | 0 | 2 | 9 | 8 | +1 | 9 | |
| 4 | Gʻijduvon | 5 | 1 | 0 | 4 | 6 | 9 | −3 | 3 | |
| 5 | Pakhtakor-79 | 5 | 1 | 0 | 4 | 5 | 11 | −6 | 3 | |
| 6 | Bunyodkor-2 Farm | 5 | 1 | 0 | 4 | 5 | 13 | −8 | 3 | |

Updated to match(es) played on 10-dekabr 2020-yil. Source: Uzbekistan Professional Football League
Rules for classification: 1) Points; 2) Head-to-head points; 3) Head-to-head goal difference; 4) Head-to-head goals scored; 5) Goal difference; 6) Goals scored; .

| Home \ Away | YAN | PAK | RUB | GIJ | PAKH | BUN |
|---|---|---|---|---|---|---|
| Yangiyer | — | | 1–0 | 1–0 | | 4–0 |
| Paxtakor-2 Farm | | — | | 2–0 | | 2–0 |
| Rubin | | 1–3 | — | | 3–1 | 3–2 |
| Gʻijduvon | | | 1–2 | — | 1–2 | |
| Pakhtakor-79 | 2–4 | 0–2 | | | — | |
| Bunyodkor-2 Farm | | | | 2–4 | 1–0 | — |

Updated to match(es) played on 10 November 2020. Source: Championat.asia
Legend: Blue = home team win; Yellow = draw; Red = away team win.

==== First League Second Stage, Bottom Six Teams ====
| Pos | Team | Pld | W | D | L | GF | GA | GD | Pts | Promotion, qualification or relegation |
|---|---|---|---|---|---|---|---|---|---|---|
| 1 | Lokomotiv-BFK | 5 | 3 | 1 | 1 | 13 | 6 | +7 | 10 | |
| 2 | Aral-Samali | 5 | 3 | 1 | 1 | 9 | 6 | +3 | 10 | |
| 3 | Chigʻatoy | 5 | 3 | 0 | 2 | 15 | 15 | 0 | 9 | |
| 4 | Navbahor-2 | 5 | 2 | 0 | 3 | 11 | 7 | +4 | 6 | |
| 5 | Jizzax-Bars | 5 | 1 | 3 | 1 | 6 | 7 | −1 | 6 | |
| 6 | Yashnobod | 5 | 0 | 1 | 4 | 8 | 21 | −13 | 1 | Relegation to the second league |

Updated to match(es) played on 10-dekabr 2023-yil. Source: Uzbekistan Professional Football League
Rules for classification: 1) Points; 2) Head-to-head points; 3) Head-to-head goal difference; 4) Head-to-head goals scored; 5) Goal difference; 6) Goals scored; .

| Home \ Away | LOK | ARA | CHI | NAV | JIZ | YASH |
|---|---|---|---|---|---|---|
| Lokomotiv BFK | — | | | | 1–1 | 5–2 |
| Aral samali | 2–1 | — | | 1–0 | | 4–0 |
| Chigʻatoy | 0–4 | 4–1 | — | | 3–1 | |
| Navbahor-2 | 1–2 | | 5–1 | — | | 4–1 |
| Jizzax-Bars | | 1–1 | | 2–1 | — | |
| Yashnobod | | | 4–7 | | 1–1 | — |

Updated to match(es) played on 5 December 2020. Source: Championat.asia
Legend: Blue = home team win; Yellow = draw; Red = away team win.

== See also ==
- 2020 Uzbekistan Super League
- 2020 Uzbekistan Pro League
- 2020 Uzbekistan Second League
- 2020 Uzbekistan Cup
- 2020 Uzbekistan League Cup
