= 1994 Uzbek League =

Uzbek League
- Season: 1994
- Champions: Neftchi Farg'ona; 3rd title 3rd in a row
- Relegated: Guliston; Aral Nukus

The 1994 Uzbek League season was the third edition of top level football in Uzbekistan since independence from the Soviet Union in 1992.

== Overview ==
It was contested by 16 teams, and Neftchi Farg'ona won the championship. Neftchi Farg'ona won the league title again for the third time and third in a row

On winning the championship, Neftchi also qualified for the 1995–96 Asian Club Championship edition. Neftchi also won the 1994 Uzbek Cup, which meant that no Uzbek team would be represented in the 1995–96 Asian Cup Winners' Cup.

Nurafshon Buxoro whom came runners up would enter the 1995 Commonwealth of Independent States Cup which would normally go to the league winners.

Guliston and Aral Nukus were relegated.

== League standings ==
Pos	Team	Pld	W	D	L	GF	GA	GD	Pts	Qualification or relegation
1	Neftchi Farg'ona	30	21	8	1	82	36	+46	50	Qualification to 1995–96 Asian Club Championship
2	Nurafshon Buxoro	30	20	4	6	63	31	+32	44	Qualification to 1995 Commonwealth of Independent States Cup
3	Navbahor Namangan	30	17	6	7	58	26	+32	40	
4	MHSK Tashkent	30	16	7	7	57	28	+29	39	
5	Temiryo'lchi Qo'qon	30	16	4	10	50	42	+8	36	
6	Sogdiana Jizzakh	30	14	7	9	53	35	+18	35	
7	Politotdel Tashkent	30	14	7	9	45	35	+10	35	
8	Pakhtakor Tashkent	30	13	9	8	56	37	+19	35	
9	Traktor Tashkent	30	10	7	13	27	33	−6	27	
10	Termez	30	11	4	15	42	51	−9	26	
11	Navro'z Andijan	30	11	3	16	34	50	−16	25	
12	Yangiyer	30	8	6	16	44	44	0	22	
13	Atlaschi Marg'ilon	30	6	7	17	28	58	−30	19	
14	Chirchiq	30	8	2	20	31	77	−46	18	
15	Aral Nukus	30	6	3	21	26	65	−39	15	Relegation to Uzbekistan 1-Division
16	Guliston	30	6	2	22	16	64	−48	14	Relegation to Uzbekistan 1-Division

== Match results ==
	1	2	3	4	5	6	7	8	9	10	11	12	13	14	15	16
1. Neftchi Farg'ona		2:0	2:1	3:3	3:1	3:2	3:1	5:3	5:0	2:2	7:1	3:1	1:0	6:1	5:1	3:0
2. Nurafshon Buxoro	1:2		1:0	1:0	5:3	3:2	2:1	3:3	2:0	2:0	4:1	2:0	3:2	3:1	7:1	4:2
3. Navbahor Namangan	1:1	1:2		3:3	1:0	2:1	2:1	1:1	2:0	2:1	0:0	2:1	7:0	2:0	2:0	8:0
4. MHSK Tashkent	1:1	0:0	2:1		2:1	2:1	4:0	1:1	1:0	3:0	3:0	3:1	2:0	10:2	3:0	2:0
5. Temiryo'lchi Qo'qon	1:1	1:0	2:1	1:0		2:2	3:1	3:1	1:1	2:0	4:2	2:1	2:1	1:0	1:0	2:0
6. Sogdiana Jizzakh	3:3	1:2	2:1	2:1	3:0		1:0	1:1	1:1	3:2	1:0	4:0	2:0	4:1	4:0	2:0
7. Politotdel Tashkent	2:2	1:0	2:0	2:0	4:1	0:0		0:0	1:0	2:1	3:2	1:1	6:1	0:1	1:0	2:0
8. Pakhtakor Tashkent	1:1	3:2	1:1	2:0	2:4	3:1	0:1		1:2	0:1	2:0	1:2	1:0	6:1	5:1	5:0
9. Traktor Tashkent	3:4	0:1	0:0	1:2	1:2	1:3	1:0	1:1		2:0	1:1	3:1	3:0	1:0	2:0	1:0
10. Termez	1:1	0:3	2:3	0:1	3:1	2:1	2:2	2:0	1:0		3:2	4:3	1:1	4:1	2:1	3:1
11. Navro'z Andijan	0:2	1:4	0:1	1:0	1:0	0:1	2:1	2:3	1:0	1:2		2:1	2:0	4:1	2:1	2:0
12. Yangiyer	1:2	0:0	0:1	1:1	2:0	1:0	3:3	0:0	0:1	3:1	0:1		5:0	6:1	2:0	5:0
13. Atlaschi Marg'ilon	1:3	1:1	0:2	0:0	1:1	0:2	2:2	0:2	0:0	3:1	1:2	2:1		2:0	2:2	3:0
14. Chirchiq	1:2	0:2	0:2	1:3	2:1	2:2	1:3	1:4	2:0	1:0	2:0	1:1	0:2		3:2	3:0
15. Aral Nukus	1:3	1:3	1:4	1:4	1:3	2:1	0:1	0:1	0:0	3:1	0:0	1:0	2:0	4:0		3:0
16. Guliston	0:2	1:0	0:4	1:0	0:4	0:0	0:1	1:1	0:1	1:0	2:1	2:1	2:3	0:1	3:0	

== Top scorer ==
#	Footballer	Club	Goals
1	(Uzbekistan) Ravshan Bozorov	Neftchi Farg'ona	26
2	(Uzbekistan) Oleg Shatskikh	Politotdel Tashkent	19
3	(Uzbekistan) Olim Tillayev	Nurafshon Buxoro	19
