= FK Guliston =

- Full name: Guliston futbol klubi
- Founded: 1962
- Ground: Guliston Stadium
- Capacity: 12,400
- Manager: Bakhtiyor Ashurmatov
- League: Uzbekistan First League
- 2013: 13th (relegated)
Home colours	Away colours

FK Guliston (Uzbek: Гулистон футбол клуби) (Tajik: Dastai futboli Guliston, Persian: گلستان) is an Uzbekistani football club based in Guliston, Sirdaryo Region.

== History ==
FK Guliston played 4 seasons in the Uzbek League: 1993, 1994, 2000, 2003. In 1992 the club won the First Division and were promoted to the Uzbek League. The club played until 1994 under the name of Shifokor Guliston. In 2001 FK Guliston and FK Yangiyer merged into FK Sirdaryo representing the Sirdaryo region. Since 2009 the club has played under the name of FK Guliston again with FK Yangiyer representing a separate team as well.

At the end of season 2011 FK Guliston were promoted to top league. The club could not enter the 2012 Uzbek League and was replaced by Qizilqum Zarafshon because of financial problems. On 19 December 2011 Alexander Mochinov was appointed as new head coach of the club.

At the end of the 2012 First League season FK Guliston gained promotion to Uzbek Oliy League again, after securing second place in their division. In 2013 Uzbek League FK Guliston began with good start, but finished season in 13th position and relegated to First League. The club manager Bakhtiyor Ashurmatov left the club in December 2013.

=== Name change history ===
- until 1994: Shifokor Guliston
- 1994—2001: FK Guliston
- 2001—2008: FK Sirdaryo
- 2009— : FK Guliston

== League history ==
Season	Div.	Pos.	Pl.	W	D	L	GS	GA	P	Cup	Top Scorer (League)
1992	1st League	1	30	21	5	4	72	24	47	R16	
1993	UzL	14	30	8	3	19	37	76	19	R32	(Uzbekistan) Rinat Sayfutdinov – 6 (Uzbekistan) Vasiliy Sevostyanov – 5
1994	UzL	16	30	6	2	22	16	64	14	R32	
1995	1st League	21	26	9	10	7	37	30	37	R32	
1996	1st League	15	52	20	11	21	87	77	71	FR*	
1997	1st League	9	42	20	3	19	80	37	63	R32	
1998	1st League	20	38	4	2	32	30	118	14	PR	
1999	2nd League										
2000	UzL	18	38	8	7	23	39	70	31	-	
2001	1st League	4	32	19	5	8	47	23	62	-	
2002	1st League	1	22	24	4	4	68	22	76	R32	
2003	UzL	16	30	6	3	21	22	65	21	GS	
2004	1st League	4	40	22	9	9	82	46	75	R16	
2005	1st League	15	34	10	4	20	50	56	34	GS	(Uzbekistan) Akmal Suyarov – 15
2006	1st League	20	38	6	3	29	36	99	15	R32	(Uzbekistan) Jo'rabek Do'smatov – 7
2007	2nd League										
2008	2nd League										
2009	2nd League	1	4	4	0	0	16	1	12	-	
2010	1st League	3	30	18	3	9	59	31	57	FR	
2011	1st League	2	30	19	8	3	56	21	65	R16	
2012	1st League	2	30	20	5	5	69	41	65	R16	
2013	UzL	13	26	6	2	18	28	62	20	1/4	(Uzbekistan) Muiddin Mamazulunov – 10
2014	1st League										

== Honours ==
- Uzbekistan First League champion: 2
  - 1992, 2002
- Uzbekistan First League runner-up: 2
  - 2011, 2012

== Managerial history ==
Name	Period
(Uzbekistan) Murad Atadjanov	
(Uzbekistan) Alexandr Lushin	2011
(Uzbekistan) Alexandr Mochinov	2011
(Uzbekistan) Zokhid Nurmatov	2012
(Uzbekistan) Bakhtiyor Ashurmatov	2012–2013
