= 2022 Uzbekistan First League =

Uzbekistan First League
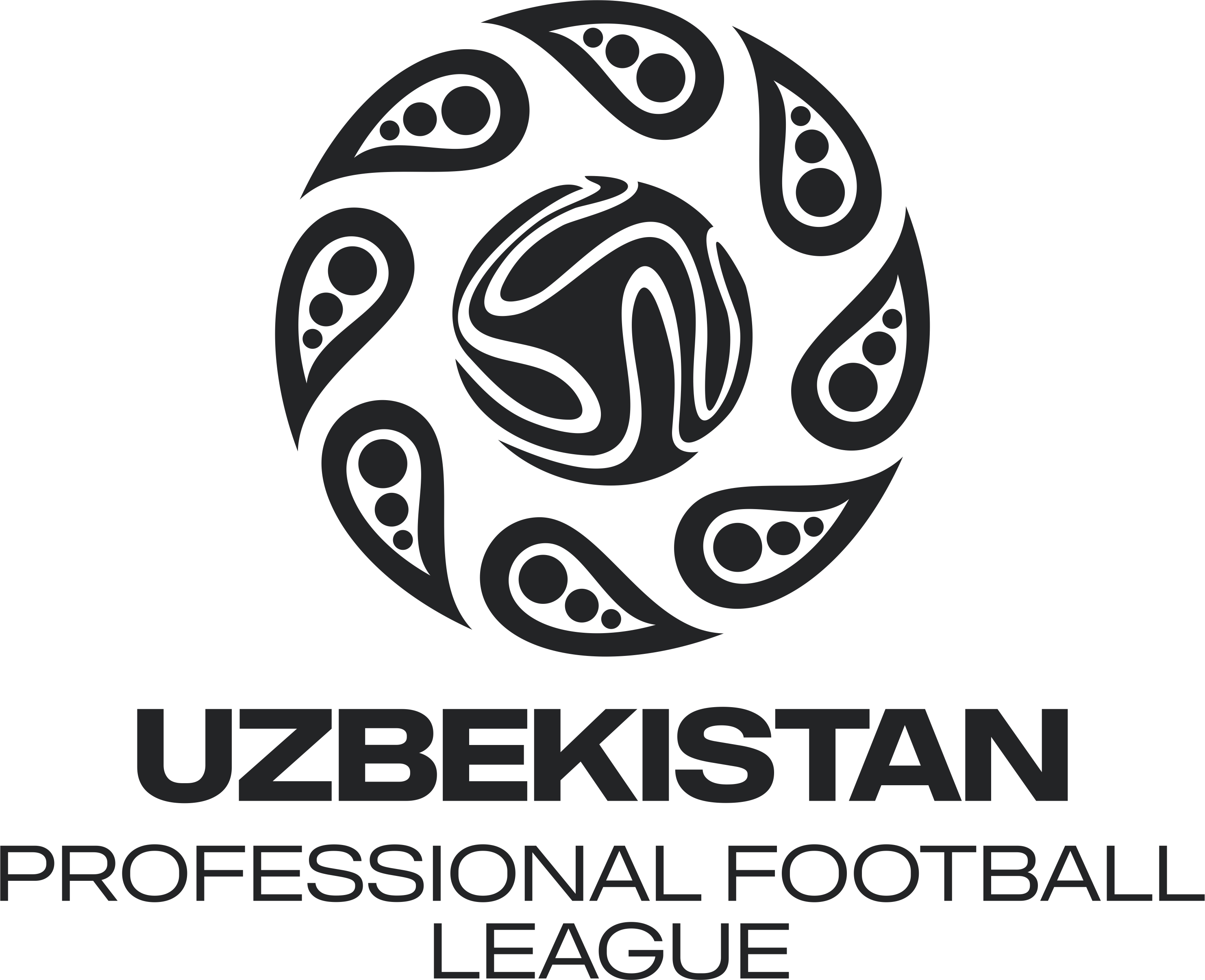
- Season: 2022
- Champions: Zaamin
- Relegated: Jizzakh-Bars
- Matches: 100
- Goals: 413 (4.13 per match)
- Top goalscorer: Abdujabbor Zuhriddinov (18 goals)
- Biggest home win: Navbahor Farm 5-2 Lokomotiv BFK (24 April 2022)
- Biggest away win: Dustlik Oltiariq 0–5 Bunyodkor Farm (16 October 2022)
- Highest scoring: Shahrixonchi 5–4 Unired (10 September 2021)
- Longest winning run: 7 matches – Zaamin
- Longest unbeaten run: 12 matches – Gʻijduvon
- Longest winless run: 16 matches – Jizzakh-Bars
- Longest losing run: 16 matches – Rubin
- Highest attendance: 919 (4 May 2021, Zaamin 2-1 Navbahor-Farm)
- Lowest attendance: 1 (9 May 2021, Bunyodkor-Farm 3-2 Rubin)
- All statistics correct as of 29 November 2022.

The 2022 Uzbekistan First League (Uzbek: Футбол бўйича 2022-йилги Ўзбекистон Биринчи лигаси) was the third season of the third division in Uzbekistan football league system. The tournament ran from March to November 2022, with 16 clubs participating. Previously, the First League format included 16 teams competing in a round-robin format; the results of each round counted toward the overall standings. Navbahor-2 marked a continuation of the competitive balance and intense battle for the title at the top of the First League standings.

== Tournament table ==
No.	Team	Game	Win	Draw	Loss	GD	Points
1	Navbahor Farm	26	18	5	3	62-25	59
2	Aral	26	18	3	5	65-33	57
3	Paxtakor-79	26	17	2	7	49-29	53
4	Andijon II	26	17	1	8	42-29	52
5	Shahrixonchi	26	14	6	6	48-36	48
6	Unired	26	11	5	10	45-40	38
7	Doʻstlik Toshkent	26	9	6	11	33-39	33
8	Qumqoʻrgʻon-1977	26	8	8	10	35-49	32
9	Qizilqum-Farm	26	9	4	13	39-54	31
10	Bunyodkor-Farm	26	8	3	15	47-49	27
11	Doʻstlik Oltiariq	26	9	0	17	45-58	27
12	Nasaf-Farm	26	7	3	16	35-52	24
13	Chigʻatoy	26	6	5	15	44-60	23
14	Lokomotiv-BFK	26	3	5	18	37-73	14
15	Neftgazmontaj	0	0	0	0	0-0	0
16	Lochin	0	0	0	0	0-0	0

== Top goalscorers ==
#	Player	Club	Goals
1	Abdujabbor Zukhriddinov	Lokomotiv BFK	18
2	Shakhboz Jumaboev	Andijan-SGS	15
3	Muydin Mamazulunov	Dustlik Oltiariq	15
4	Ruslan Kalmagambetov	Aral	15
5	Damir Nizanov	Aral	13
6	Asilbek Orifjonov	Navbahor-Farm	13
7	Asomiddin Mamatov	Unired	12
8	Javokhir Khusanov	Navbahor-Farm	12
9	Yashnarbek Rakhmonov	Lokomotiv BFK	12
10	Sayyodbek Davronov	Unired	11
11	Komiljon Tojiddinov	Navbahor-Farm	11
12	Farkhod Utkirov	Bunyodkor-Farm	11
13	Bobur Mamadzhonov	Pakhtakor-79	9
14	Abdulaziz Rakhimov	Dustlik Tashkent	9
15	Ilkhomjon Kenjaev	Qizilqum-Farm	9
16	Kwasi Anani Juius	Pakhtakor-79	9
17	Abror Sarimsoqov	Nasaf-Farm	8
18	Sarvar Sharipov	Chig'atoy	8
19	Shokir Odiljonov	Andijon-SGS	8
20	Qodir Ikromov	Navbahor-Farm	8

== See also ==
- 2022 Uzbekistan Pro League
- 2022 Uzbekistan Super League
- 2022 Uzbekistan Cup
