= Zayniddin Tadjiyev =

Uzbek footballer

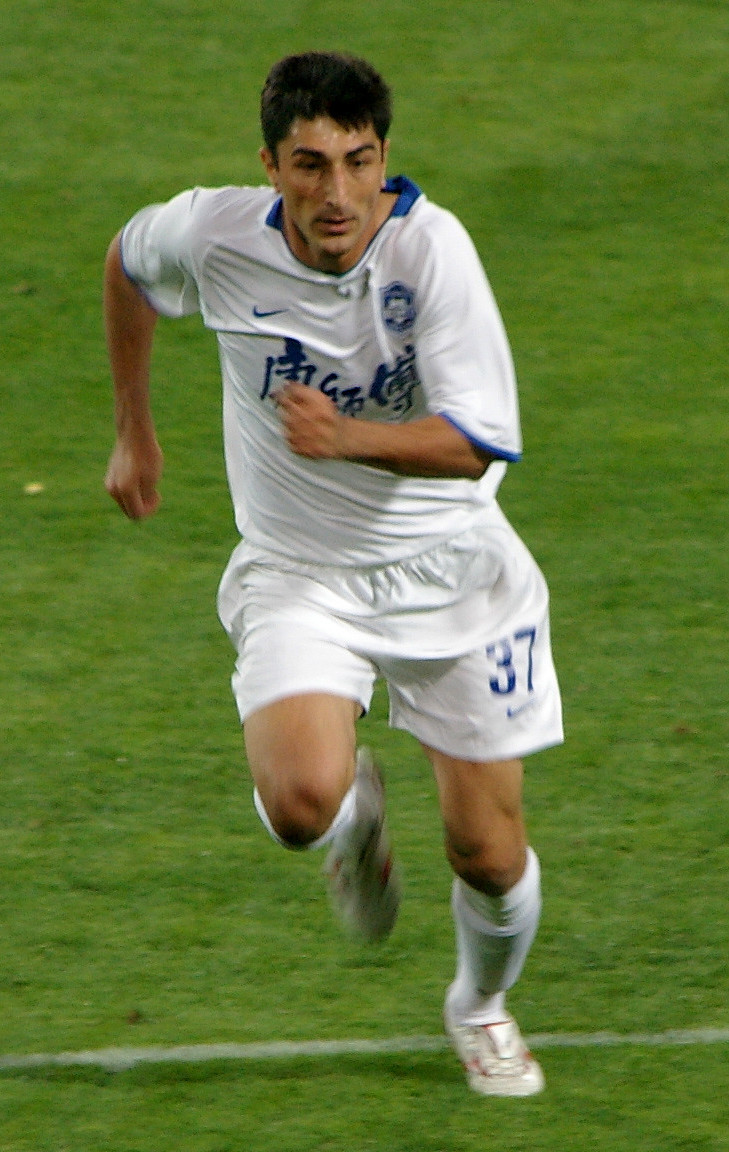

Personal information
- Date of birth: 21 June 1977 (age 49)
- Place of birth: Soviet Union
- Height: 1.85 m (6 ft 1 in)
- Position: Striker

Senior career*
Years	Team	Apps	(Gls)
2001	Akademiya Tashkent	33	(10)
2002–2004	Pakhtakor Tashkent	85	(36)
2005	Esil Bogatyr	23	(1)
2006	Pakhtakor Tashkent	44	(22)
2007	Saba Battery	10	(2)
2007–2009	Pakhtakor Tashkent	56	(30)
2009	Tianjin Teda	13	(2)
2010	Shurtan Guzar	8	(2)
2010	Ordabasy	6	(1)
2010	Pakhtakor Tashkent	1	(0)
2011–2013	Lokomotiv Tashkent	42	(51)
2013	Neftchi Farg'ona	11	(1)
2014	Dinamo Samarqand	25	(2)
2015	Bukhara	6	(0)

International career
2002–2010	Uzbekistan	18	(3)
- * Club domestic league appearances and goals as of 18 April 2015

Zayniddin Tadjiyev (Uzbek: Зайниддин Тожиев or Zayniddin Tojiev) (born on 21 June 1977) is a retired Uzbek footballer.

== Career ==
=== Pakhtakor ===
He started his playing career at Akademiya Tashkent. From 2002 to 2004 he played for Pakhtakor Tashkent. Playing for Pakhtakor he won several Uzbek League championships and the Uzbek Cup. In the 2008 Uzbek League season Tadjiyev scored 17 goals, following the top goalscorer of the season Server Djeparov with 19 goals. In 2009 Pakhtakor qualified for the quarter-finals of the 2009 AFC Champions League and Tadjiyev was the top goalscorer of the club, scoring 5 goals in the tournament. With 13 goals he is currently the best goalscorer of Pakhtakor in AFC Champions League and one of the all-time top goalscorers of the tournament.

=== Lokomotiv Tashkent ===
In 2011, he moved to Lokomotiv Tashkent to play in the Uzbekistan First League. In 2011 season he became the best top goalscorer of First League with 30 goals and gained promotion to the Uzbek League with Lokomotiv. Tadjiyev was also the top goal scorer of Lokomotiv in 2012 season, scoring 11 goals. In 2013, he played the first half of season for Lokomotiv, scoring 4 goals in 9 matches. During the Second half of the 2013 season he played for Neftchi Farg'ona.

=== Dinamo ===
In 2014, he moved to Dinamo Samarqand. In February 2015 he left Dinamo and signed a contract with FK Buxoro.

== International ==
Tadjiyev has made 18 appearances for the Uzbekistan national football team, including seven FIFA World Cup qualifying matches, scoring a total of 3 goals.

He has scored a total of 100 goals in the Uzbek League and (as of 7 November 2014), 144 goals in all competitions. This gave him entry to the Gennadi Krasnitsky club of Uzbek top goalscorers.

== Career statistics ==
=== Goals for National Team ===
#	Date	Venue	Opponent	Score	Result	Competition
1.	14 May 2002	Prešov, Slovakia	Slovakia	4–1	Lost	Friendly
2.	28 May 2004	Baku, Azerbaijan	Azerbaijan	3–1	Lost	Friendly
3.	22 March 2008	Tashkent, Uzbekistan	Jordan	4–1	Won	Friendly

== Honours ==
=== Club ===
Pakhtakor

- Uzbek League (4): 2002, 2003, 2004, 2006
- Uzbek League runner-up (3): 2008, 2009, 2010
- Uzbek Cup (4): 2002, 2003, 2004, 2006, 2009
- AFC Champions League semifinal (2): 2003, 2004

=== Individual ===
Uzbekistan First League Top Scorer: 2011 (30 goals)
