= 2011 Uzbekistan Second League =

Uzbekistan Second League
- Season: 2011

Uzbekistan Second League is the third highest football league in Uzbekistan.

== Members of Uzbekistan Second League 2011 ==
Team	Location	Stadium	Stadium capacity
Khisar	Shahrisabz		
Zaamin	Jizzakh Province		
Lokomotiv BFK Tashkent	Tashkent		
Neftchi Kumkurgan	Surxondaryo Province		
Neftchi Khamza	Fergana Province		
Ohangaron	Tashkent Province		
Navruz	Sirdaryo Province		
Shakhrikhon	Andijan Province		
Bukhoro-2	Bukhoro		
Dinamo Nukus	Nukus		
Nuristan	Qarshi		
Yuzhanin	Navoi		
Navqiron	Samarqand		
Sokol	Uchkuduk		

== League format ==
In the second phase participated 14 teams split into three groups: Qarshi, Fergana and Bukhara. The winner of each group promote to First League

== Second phase ==
Zaamin, Neftchi Khamza, Yuzhanin and Bukhoro-2 are promoted to First Division. Zaamin is promoted to first league instead of Khisar because Khisar violated competition regulations. Disciplinary Committee declared the matches of Khisar against Zaamin, Lokomotiv BFK and Neftchi Kumkurgan, to be lost by Khisar by forfeit (0:3) due to an ineligible player in the Khisar team taking part in 2011 matches.

=== Group Qarshi ===
Pos	Team	Pld	W	D	L	GF	GA	GF	Pts	Qualification or relegation
1	Khisar	3	2	1	0	13	2	+9	7	Promotion to the First League
2	Zaamin	3	2	0	1	8	7	+1	6	.
3	Lokomotiv BFK	3	1	1	1	2	3	-1	4	.
4	Neftchi Kumkurgan	3	0	0	3	3	14	-11	0	.

=== Group Ferghana ===
Pos	Team	Pld	W	D	L	GF	GA	GF	Pts	Qualification or relegation
1	Neftchi Khamza	3	3	0	0	4	1	+3	9	Promotion to the First League
2	Shakhrikhon	3	2	0	1	5	4	+1	6	.
3	Navruz	3	1	0	2	4	4	0	3	.
4	Ohangaron	3	0	0	3	3	7	-4	0	.

=== Group Bukhora ===
Final standings after last matchday.

Pos	Team	Pld	W	D	L	GF	GA	GF	Pts	Qualification or relegation
1	Yuzhanin	4	4	0	0	10	4	+6	12	Promotion to the First League
2	Bukhoro-2	4	3	0	1	16	5	+11	9	.
3	Nuristan	4	2	0	2	7	6	+1	6	.
4	Dinamo Nukus	4	0	1	3	6	15	-9	1	.
5	Sokol	4	0	1	3	6	15	-9	1	.
