= 2021 Uzbekistan First League =

Uzbekistan First League
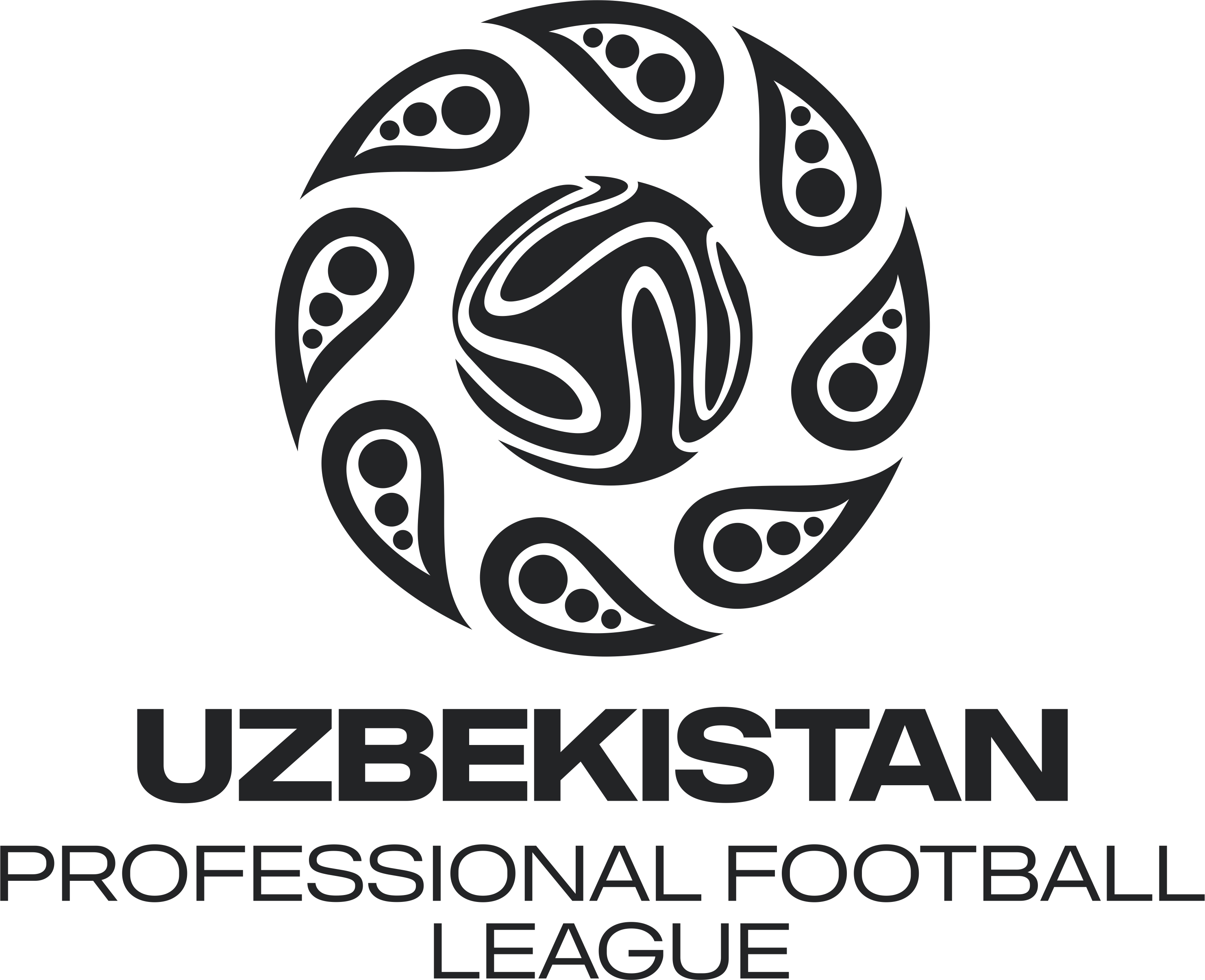
- Season: 2021
- Champions: Zaamin
- Relegated: Jizzakh-Bars
- Matches: 100
- Goals: 413 (4.13 per match)
- Top goalscorer: Muhammad Odilov (16 goals)
- Biggest home win: Gʻijduvon 6-2 Lokomotiv BFK (29 August 2021)
- Biggest away win: Lochin 0–5 Bunyodkor Farm
- Highest scoring: Chigʻatoy 4–6 Zaamin (13 June 2021)
- Longest winning run: 7 matches – Zaamin
- Longest unbeaten run: 12 matches – Gʻijduvon
- Longest winless run: 16 matches – Jizzakh-Bars
- Longest losing run: 16 matches – Rubin
- Highest attendance: 919 (4 May 2021, Zaamin 2-1 Navbahor-Farm)
- Lowest attendance: 1 (9 May 2021, Bunyodkor-Farm 3-2 Rubin)
- All statistics correct as of 16 November 2024.

The 2021 Uzbekistan First League (Uzbek: Футбол бўйича 2021-йилги Ўзбекистон Биринчи лигаси) was the second season of the third division in Uzbekistan football league system. The tournament ran from March to November 2021, with 12 clubs participating. One club, FC Rubin Tashkent, was disqualified due to financial problems, and its results were annulled. Zaamin led the competition with an excellent result, earning 49 points. Gijduvon and Navbahor Farm followed with 42 and 41 points, respectively. The league featured 100 matches, with a total of 413 goals scored throughout the season.

== Tournament table ==
Pos	Team	Pld	W	D	L	GF	GA	GD	Pts	Promotion, qualification or relegation
1	Zomin	20	16	1	3	55	27	+28	49	Promotion to the 2022 Uzbekistan Pro League
2	Gʻijduvon	20	13	3	4	56	24	+32	42	Promotion to the 2022 Uzbekistan Pro League play-off
3	Navbahor Farm	20	12	5	3	38	21	+17	41	
4	Neftgazmontaj	20	11	3	6	31	27	+4	36	
5	Lokomotiv BFK	20	9	1	10	37	43	−6	28	
6	Pakhtakor-79	20	7	5	8	36	42	−6	26	
7	Bunyodkor-Farm	20	8	1	11	37	37	0	25	
8	Lochin	20	7	3	10	2	45	−43	24	
9	Jomboy	20	5	2	13	29	41	−12	17	
10	Chigʻatoy	20	5	2	13	37	63	−26	17	
11	Jizzakh-Bars	20	4	0	16	20	43	−23	12	Relegation to the 2022 Uzbekistan second league
12	Rubin Tashkent	0	0	0	0	0	0	0	0 (Note: Rubin Tashkent was eliminated from the competition due to financial problems and all of its results were annulled.)	Relegation to the 2022 Uzbekistan second league

Updated to match(es) played on 10 November 2021. Source: Uzbekistan Professional Football League
Rules for classification: 1) Points; 2) Head-to-head points; 3) Head-to-head goal difference; 4) Head-to-head goals scored; 5) Goal difference; 6) Goals scored; .

== Top goalscorers ==
No.	Player	Club	Goals
1	Muhammad Odilov	Zomin	16
2	Abdulaziz Juraev	Lochin	13
3	Orif Yusupov	Pakhtakor-79	11
4	Sandy Song Longjie	G'ijduvon	11
5	Eldor Karimov	Zomin	10
6	Dilshod Khushbakov	G'ijduvon	9
7	Javohir Khusanov	Navbahor-Farm	9
8	Sanjar Rikhsiboev	Bunyodkor-Farm	8
9	Islom Boysariev	G'ijduvon	7
10	Qodir Ikromov	Navbahor-Farm	6
11	Farrukh Juraev	G'ijduvon	6
12	Abdujabbor Zukhriddinov	Lokomotiv BFK	6
13	Farkhod Utkirov	Bunyodkor-Farm	6
14	Otabek Pardaboev	Neftgazmontaj	5
15	David Candy	Neftgazmontaj	5
16	Farrukh Pardaev	Neftgazmontaj	5
17	Abdulla Nabiev	Jomboy	5
18	Sherzod Esanov	Chigatoy	5
19	Dilmurod Abdukakhkhorov	Lochin	5
20	Sherzod Rikhsiboev	Neftgazmontazh	5
21	Javokhir Khairullaev	Jizzakh Bars	5
22	Bekzod Akhmedov	Zomin	5
23	Elbek Buriev	Bunyodkor-Farm	5
24	Mirzoir Mirkhoshimov	Lochin	5
25	Abbos Jumakulov	Bunyodkor-Farm	4
26	Khodjiakbar Yunusov	Navbahor-Farm	4
27	Diyor Jaloliddinov	Navbahor-Farm	4
28	Samandar Sodikov	Chig'atoy	4
29	Farkhod Imomov	Lokomotiv BFK	4
30	Juraev Roman	Lokomotiv BFK	4
31	Khayotbek Sotvoldiev	Pakhtakor-79	4
32	Nurbek Kholjigitov	Jomboy	4
33	Bobokhon Ravshanov	Lochin	4
34	Shokhrukhmirzo Akhmadaliev	Pakhtakor-79	4
35	Bobur Mamajonov	Pakhtakor-79	4
36	Ravshanbek Khursanov	Chig'atoy	4
37	Anvarjon Faizullaev	Lokomotiv BFK	4
38	Zafarjon Tursunov	Bunyodkor-Farm	4
39	Jahongir Safarov	Jizzakh-Bars	4
40	Dilshod Fayziev	Lochin	3
41	Bakhodir Daminov	Zomin	3
42	Jonibek Kuchimov	Zomin	3
43	Khislat Khalilov	Chig'atoy	3
44	Javohir Temirov	Neftgazmontaj	3
45	Saidulla Khairullaev	Chig'atoy	3
46	Murod Komilov	Chig'atoy	3
47	Isakov Ramzbek	Pakhtakor-79	3
48	Abdujalil Manazarov	Neftgazmontaj	3
49	Shavkat Rakhmatov	Gijduvon	3
50	Otabek Akhmadjonov	Zomin	3

== See also ==
- 2021 Uzbekistan Pro League
- 2021 Uzbekistan Super League
- 2021 Uzbekistan Cup
