= 2014 Uzbekistan PFL Cup =

Tournament details
- Country: Uzbekistan
- Teams: 16

Final positions
- Champions: Mash’al Mubarek
- Runner-up: Obod Tashkent

Tournament statistics
- Goals scored: 74

The 2014 Uzbekistan PFL Cup is the second edition of a pre-season football competition held in Uzbekistan.

The competition featured four groups of 16 teams, with the top two advancing to the quarterfinal stages.

== Group stage ==
=== Group A ===
Team	Pld	W	D	L	GF	GA	GD	Pts
NBU Osiyo	3	2	1	0	3	1	+2	7
Mash’al Mubarek	3	1	2	0	2	1	+1	5
Andijan	3	1	0	2	3	3	+0	3
Pakhtakor	3	0	1	2	1	4	–3	1

=== Group B ===
Team	Pld	W	D	L	GF	GA	GD	Pts
Dinamo Samarqand	3	3	0	0	7	0	+7	9
Kokand 1912	3	2	0	1	4	3	+1	4
Sogdiana Jizzakh	3	1	0	2	3	5	–1	3
Bunyodkor-2	3	0	0	3	1	7	–6	0

=== Group C ===
Team	Pld	W	D	L	GF	GA	GD	Pts
Obod Toshkent	3	2	1	0	8	5	+3	7
Olmaliq	3	2	0	1	7	3	+4	6
Bunyodkor	3	1	0	2	2	4	–1	3
Chust-Pakhtakor	3	0	0	3	1	11	–10	0

=== Group D ===
Team	Pld	W	D	L	GF	GA	GD	Pts
Navbahor	3	2	1	0	4	1	+3	7
FC Pakhtakor-2	3	0	3	0	4	4	+0	3
Shurtan Guzar	3	0	3	0	3	3	+0	3
Lokomotiv Tashkent	3	0	2	1	2	5	–3	2

== Knockout stage ==
=== Quarter-finals ===
17 February 2014

NBU Osiyo	0–1	Kokand 1912

17 February 2014

FK Dinamo Samarqand	0–0 (a.e.t.)	Mash’al Mubarek
Penalties
	3-4

17 February 2014

Obod Toshkent	3–0	FC Pakhtakor-2

17 February 2014

Navbahor Namangan	2–2	Olmaliq FK
Penalties
	2–3

=== Semi-finals ===
19 February 2014

Kokand 1912	0–0	Obod Toshkent
Penalties
	0–3

19 February 2014

Mash’al Mubarek	2–0	Olmaliq FK

=== Final ===
20 February 2014

Obod Toshkent	1–3	Mash’al Mubarek
