= Mikhail Bukin =

Russian footballer and referee

Personal information
- Full name: Mikhail Aleksandrovich Bukin
- Date of birth: 4 October 1967 (age 59)
- Place of birth: Leningrad, Russian SFSR
- Height: 1.82 m (5 ft 11 1/2 in)
- Position: Defender

Youth career
- Smena Leningrad

Senior career*
| Years | Team | Apps | (Gls) |
| 1985 | FC Zenit Leningrad | 0 | (0) |
| 1986–1988 | FC Dynamo Leningrad | 54 | (2) |
| 1989 | FC Dynamo Bryansk | 6 | (0) |
| 1989–1990 | FK Yangiyer | 40 | (0) |
| 1990–1993 | FC Tekstilshchik Kamyshin | 81 | (2) |
| 1993 | FC Lada Togliatti | 37 | (5) |
| 1994 | FC Kuban Krasnodar | 21 | (3) |
- * Club domestic league appearances and goals

Mikhail Aleksandrovich Bukin (Russian: Михаил Александрович Букин; born 4 October 1967 in Leningrad) is a former Russian football player and referee.

== Referee career ==
Referee

- Russian Second Division: 1999–2005
- Russian First Division: 2001–2005

Assistant referee

- Russian Second Division: 1998–2000
- Russian First Division: 2000
