= FC Yoshlik =

- Full name: Yoshlik futbol klubi
- Ground: Kasbi Stadium
- Head Coach: Bahrom Hakimov
- League: Uzbekistan First League
- 2011: 4

FC Erkurgan (Uzbek: Yerqurg'on, Uzbek Cyrillic: Еркургон; Russian: Еркургон) is an Uzbek football club from Koson, a city in Qashqadaryo region of Uzbekistan.

== History ==
The club qualified 2010 in Uzbekistan First Division from Second Division of Uzbek Football League. In the season 2011 FC Erkurgan played in First League, conference West.

FC Erkurgan in the 2011 season made sensation in Uzbek Cup by beating and eliminating Uzbekistan top-level club FC "Almalik" on round of 32 stage.

In March 2012 club was renamed to FC Yoshlik.
