= FK Atlaschi =

FK Atlaschi Marg'ilon
- Full name: Atlaschi Marg'ilon futbol klubi
- Founded: 1993
- Ground: Atlaschi Stadium, Margilan
- Manager: Salim Zokirov
- League: Uzbekistan First League

FK Atlaschi (Uzbek: Атласчи футбол клуби) is an Uzbekistani football club based in Margilan. Currently it plays in the Uzbekistan First League

== History ==
FK Atlaschi was founded in 1993. The club played a total of four seasons in the Uzbek League, playing their first season in 1994. The last season the club played in the Uzbek League was in 1997. In 2012 the club played in Uzbekistan First League, Zone "East".

== Achievements ==
- Uzbek League:

7th place: 1995
