= Uzbekistan Mahallas Association =

Association of Mahallas of Uzbekistan
- Oʻzbekiston mahallalari uyushmasi
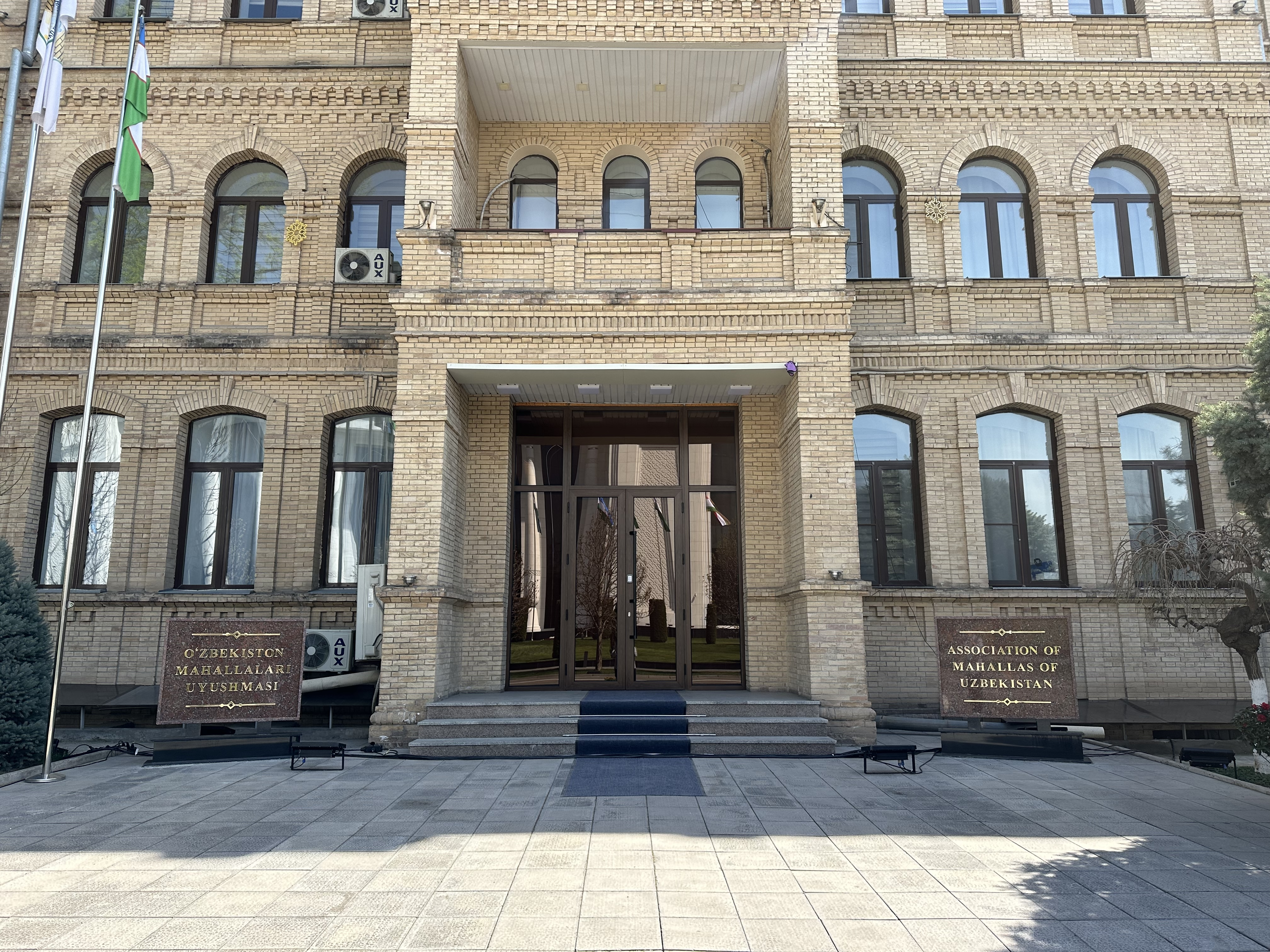
- Abbreviation: AMU
- Formation: January 18, 2024; 2 years ago
- Type: Government agency
- Legal status: Active
- Purpose: Enhancing the role of mahallas in public life and improving local self-governance
- Headquarters: Tashkent, Uzbekistan
- Location: Tashkent, Uzbekistan
- Coordinates: 41.3086308°N 69.2837808°E
- Region served: Uzbekistan
- Official language: Uzbek, Russian
- Chairman: Qahramon Quronboyev
- Deputy Chairman: Jovdatxon Inagamov
- Parent organization: Government of Uzbekistan
- Website: mahallas.uz/uz/

The Association of Mahallas of Uzbekistan (Uzbek: Oʻzbekiston mahallalari uyushmasi) is a state administrative body in Uzbekistan. The association operates to increase the role of mahallas in public life and to improve the system of governance in this sphere. It has regional administrations in the Republic of Karakalpakstan, all regions, and the city of Tashkent, as well as district (city) departments.

== History ==
The Association of Mahallas of Uzbekistan was established on 17 January 2024 in accordance with Presidential Decree No. PF-209, “On measures aimed at fundamentally increasing the role of the mahalla institution in society and ensuring its function as the primary link in addressing citizens’ issues”, adopted on 21 December 2023, as well as Resolution No. PQ-402, “On additional measures to establish the activities of the Association of Mahallas of Uzbekistan and to improve the governance system in mahallas.” At the founding conference of the organization, Qahramon Quronboyev was elected as Chairman of the association.

== Purpose and functions ==
- Strengthening the links between the mahalla and the state;
- Ensuring public participation in mahalla governance;
- Increasing citizens’ sense of responsibility;
- Mobilizing internal resources through the “Mahalla Seven” framework;
- Improving the material and technical base of mahallas;
- Enhancing the qualifications of mahalla officials.
