= FC Gʻijduvon =

Gʻijduvon
- Full name: Gʻijduvon Football Club
- Nickname: "Gʻijduvonliklar"
- Founded: 2013
- Ground: Gʻijduvon Stadium
- Capacity: 5,000
- Manager: (Tajikistan) Hakim Fuzaylov
- League: Uzbekistan Pro League
- 2018: 3rd
Home colours	Away colours

Gʻijduvon is an Uzbek football club based in Gʻijduvon, Bukhara Region, Uzbekistan.

== History ==
The team was founded in 1991 under the name "Zarangar". Since 1993 the club has been known as "Gʻijduvon". In 2013 the club was revived and began participating again as a professional team. In 1992, the club began playing in Uzbekistan First League. It finished last (16th place) and withdrew from the competition after 17 matches, later joining the Uzbekistan Second League. In the following years, the team participated in the Bukhara Region championship and the Uzbekistan Second League. The club temporarily suspended its activities but was revived again in 2013. During 2014 Uzbekistan First League season, the club competed in the league but failed to reach the final stage. In the final stage of the competition, the team finished 11th among 12 teams in the Western group. In 2015, the team again participated in the First League. Based on the results of the initial stage, the club finished 8th in the Western group and qualified for the final stage, where it finished last, in 16th place. In the 2016 Uzbekistan First League season, the club finished 15th among 18 teams. In 2017, the club participated in Bukhara Regional championship and Uzbekistan Second League. Starting from 2018 Uzbekistan Pro-B League season, Gʻijduvon participated in Uzbekistan Pro League (known as the First League until 2017), the second tier of Uzbek football. Before the 2024 season, the squad was strengthened with several experienced players and experienced Tajik coach Hakim Fuzaylov was appointed as head coach.

On 5 February 2024, the club announced a new official logo. Later, Uzbekistan Professional Football League announced that Gʻijduvon would not participate in Uzbekistan Pro League due to unpaid debts and failure to meet league licensing requirements.

On 14 March 2024, it was announced that Gʻijduvon would not participate in professional or semi-professional competitions during the 2024 Uzbekistan Pro League season due to financial problems.

== Coaching staff ==
Position	Coach
Head coach	(Tajikistan) Hakim Fuzaylov
Assistant coach	(Tajikistan) Rahmatullo Fuzaylov
Assistant coach	(Uzbekistan) Akmal Xolmatov
Assistant coach	(Uzbekistan) Suhrob Qobilov
Assistant coach	(Uzbekistan) Roʻzimboy Ahmedov
Goalkeeper coach	(Uzbekistan) Aleksandr Kit

== Managers ==
Manager	Years
(Uzbekistan) Sherzod Sattorov	
(Uzbekistan) Umidjon Qudratov	2022
(Uzbekistan) Bahodir Shaymardanov	
(Uzbekistan) Gennadiy Kochnev	2022-2023
(Tajikistan) Hakim Fuzaylov	2024-
