= FC Spartak Tashkent =

Spartak Toshkent futbol klubi
- Founded: 1936
- Manager: Ravshan Usmankhodjaev
- League: Uzbek League Division One, zone "East"
- 2011: 6nd

FC Spartak Tashkent (Uzbek: "Spartak" Toshkent futbol klubi) is an Uzbek football club, playing in the capital, Tashkent.

== History ==
FC Spartak Tashkent is one of the oldest Uzbek football clubs. The first match played by the club was a friendly in 1936. With the support of coach Ravshan Usmankhodjaev, in 2007 the club managed to qualify for the Uzbek League Division One.

In the 2011 season FC Spartak played in Uzbek League Division One, zone "East".
