= NBU Osiyo =

F.C. NBU Asia
- Full name: NBU Osiyo futbol klubi
- Founded: 2000
- Ground: Yoshlik Kamolot Stadium
- Manager: Ravshan Bozorov
- League: Uzbekistan First League
- 2013: 7th

FC NBU Asia (Uzbek: НБУ Осиё футбол клуби) is an Uzbekistani football club based in Tashkent. Currently it plays in Uzbekistan First League

== History ==
NBU Osiyo was founded in 2000 and in its first season became champion of Uzbekistan Second League and promoted to Uzbekistan First League. 2013 season club finished 7th in 2nd championship round of First League. After 2013 season finished club head coach Mukhtor Qurbonov left the club and on 6 January 2014 was appointed as head coach of Shurtan Guzar which relegated to First League for 2014 season. In January 2014 Jafar Irismetov was appointed as new head coach of the NBU Osiyo.

== League history ==
Season	Div.	Pos.	Pl.	W	D	L	GS	GA	P	Cup	Top Scorer (League)
2001	1st	5	32	17	7	8	51	25	58	-	
2002	1st	4	32	20	6	6	54	23	66	R32	
2003	1st	3	28	16	5	7	73	36	53	R16	
2004^{1}	1st	3	3	0	2	1	4	7	2	R32	(Uzbekistan) Obid Oripov – 24
2005^{1}	1st	4	3	0	0	3	1	7	0	R16	
2006	1st	4	38	24	1	13	67	54	73	R32	(Uzbekistan) Leonid Senkevich – 26
2007	1st	8	38	18	9	11	55	47	63	R32	(Uzbekistan) Leonid Senkevich – 20
2008	1st	11	34	12	7	15	48	53	43	R32	
2009	1st	10	26	9	5	12	43	36	32	R32	(Uzbekistan) Aziz Asimov – 20
2010^{2}	1st	16	30	4	2	24	25	64	14	R32	
2011	1st	16	30	6	2	22	25	68	20	R32	
2012	1st	3	30	16	8	6	50	33	56	R32	(Uzbekistan) Abdulatif Abduqodirov – 22
2013	1st	7	30	13	4	13	42	42	43	R32	(Uzbekistan) Husniddin Gafurov – 14

In 2004–2005 seasons the club league position and match statistics of 2nd championship round is given where club qualified.
In 2010–2013 seasons the league position and match statistics of 2nd championship round is given where club qualified.

== Managers ==
- (Uzbekistan) Ilhom Mo'minjonov (2011–2012)
- (Uzbekistan) Mukhtor Qurbonov (2012–2013)
- (Uzbekistan) Jafar Irismetov (2014)
- (Uzbekistan) Ravshan Bozorov (2014–)
