= FK Khiva =

- Full name: Xiva futbol klubi
- Ground: Spartak Stadium Khiva
- Capacity: 8,000
- Manager: Mansur Davletov
- League: Uzbekistan First League
- 2012: 10th

FK Khiva (Uzbek: Xiva futbol klubi) is an Uzbekistani football club based in Khiva. It currently plays in the Uzbekistan First League.

== History ==
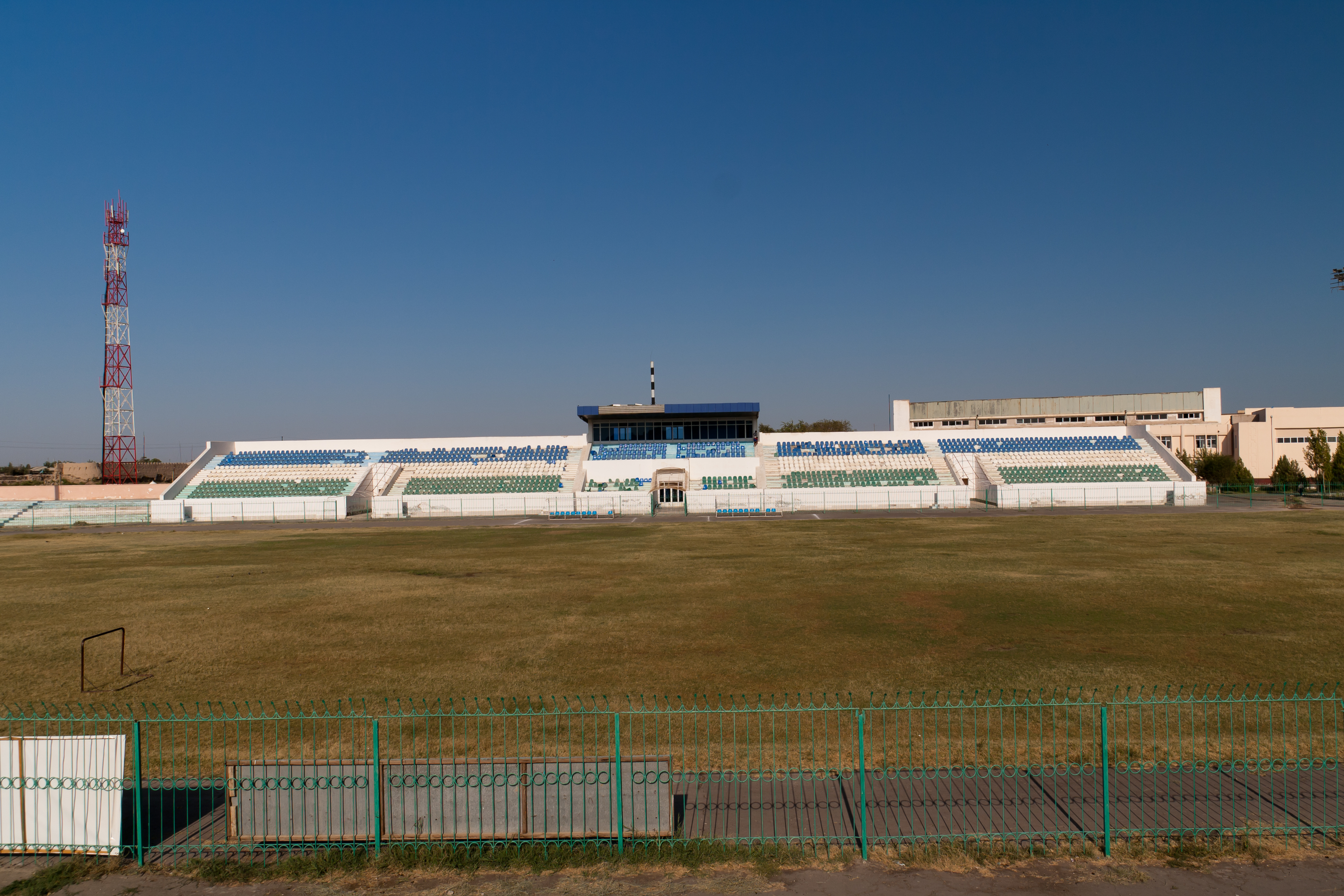
Spartak Stadium

FK Khiva plays in the West Conference of the Uzbekistan First League. In the 2012 season, the club reached the championship round, finishing fourth in its zone. At the end of the season in the championship round, they finished 10th.

== Stadium ==
Stadion Spartak (Spartak Stadium in English) is FK Khiva's home stadium. It is located in Khiva and has a capacity of 8,000 spectators.

== Players ==
Name	Position
Abror Kilichev	Defender
Aleksandr Yezhov	Defender
Orazbay Urazimbetov	Defender
Ozod Atadjanov	Midfielder
Iles Suyunov	Attacker
Orif Shamsitdinov	Attacker
Vladimir Baranov	Attacker

== Managerial history ==
Name	Nat	Period
Adambay Kurbaniyazov	(Uzbekistan)	2011
Mansur Davletov	(Uzbekistan)	2012–
