= Koson =

Koson (written: 篁村 or 古邨) is a masculine Japanese given name. Notable people with the name include:

- Aeba Koson (饗庭 篁村) (1855–1922), Japanese writer
- Ohara Koson (小原 古邨) (1877–1945), Japanese painter and printmaker

== See also ==
- Koson, Uzbekistan, a town in Qashqadaryo Region, Uzbekistan
- Koson (village), a village in Zakarpattia Oblast, Ukraine
- Coson, an inscription found on gold coins in Transilvania
