= Yangiyer =

Yangiyer Uzbek: Yangiyer
- City
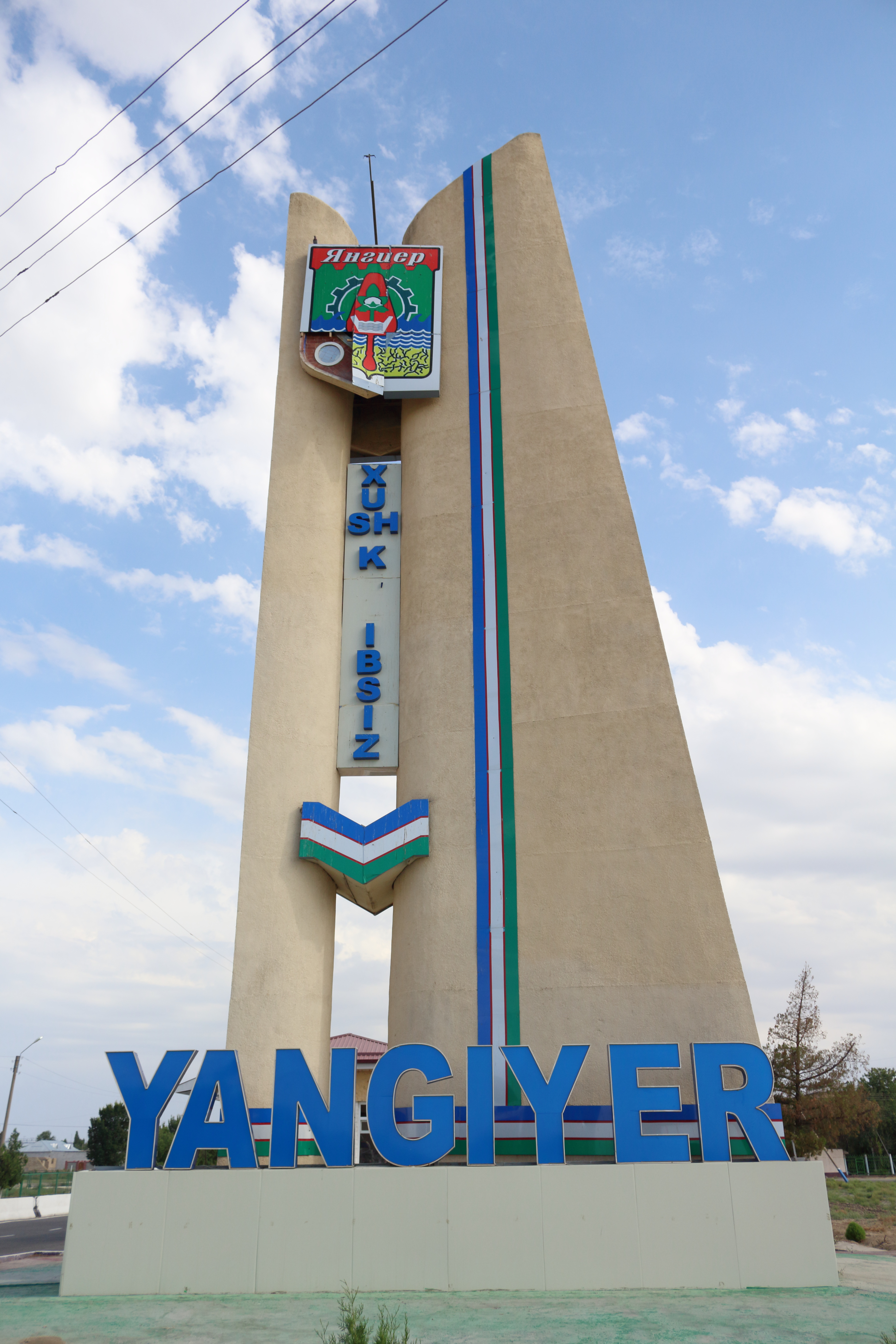

- Location in Uzbekistan
- Coordinates: 40°16′N 68°49′E
- Country: Uzbekistan
- Region: Sirdaryo Region

Area
  - Metro: 30.0 km^{2} (11.6 sq mi)

Population (2021)
  - City: 44,200
- 121000: 121001

Yangiyer (Uzbek: Yangiyer — new land) — is a city in Sirdaryo Region, Eastern Uzbekistan. It is a district-level city. Its population is 44,200 (2021).

== Etymology ==
The name of the city is translated from Uzbek as "new land".

== History ==
It was established in 1957 as part of the grand Soviet project to cultivate the naturally saline virgin lands of Mirzachoʻl, a vast area of about 10,000 square kilometres in Eastern Uzbekistan. The shortage of irrigation water was the main problem hindering the development of agriculture in the area.

== Economy ==
The city has several plants including a plant of building materials, pipe plant, asphalt plant.

Yangier also has a branch of Tashkent Institute of Agriculture and Irrigation Engineering, a college of civil engineering and a museum dedicated to cultivation of virgin lands of Mirzachoʻl.

== Climate ==
Yangiyer has a cold semi-arid climate (Köppen climate classification BSk).

Climate data for Yangiyer (1991–2020)
Month	Jan	Feb	Mar	Apr	May	Jun	Jul	Aug	Sep	Oct	Nov	Dec	Year
Mean daily maximum °C (°F)	6.1 (43.0)	8.8 (47.8)	16.0 (60.8)	23.0 (73.4)	29.3 (84.7)	35.0 (95.0)	36.4 (97.5)	34.7 (94.5)	29.6 (85.3)	22.4 (72.3)	13.8 (56.8)	7.5 (45.5)	21.9 (71.4)
Daily mean °C (°F)	2.3 (36.1)	4.2 (39.6)	10.4 (50.7)	16.5 (61.7)	22.2 (72.0)	27.3 (81.1)	28.8 (83.8)	26.8 (80.2)	21.3 (70.3)	14.8 (58.6)	8.2 (46.8)	3.6 (38.5)	15.5 (59.9)
Mean daily minimum °C (°F)	−0.5 (31.1)	0.8 (33.4)	6.2 (43.2)	11.3 (52.3)	15.7 (60.3)	19.9 (67.8)	21.5 (70.7)	19.3 (66.7)	14.1 (57.4)	8.8 (47.8)	3.8 (38.8)	0.6 (33.1)	10.1 (50.2)
Average precipitation mm (inches)	34.2 (1.35)	46.2 (1.82)	59.2 (2.33)	60.4 (2.38)	36.8 (1.45)	10.2 (0.40)	3.7 (0.15)	2.1 (0.08)	4.4 (0.17)	18.1 (0.71)	38.8 (1.53)	37.1 (1.46)	351.2 (13.83)
Average precipitation days (≥ 1.0 mm)	9	10	11	10	8	4	2	1	2	5	8	10	80
Source: NOAA
