= FK Mashʼal-2 =

FC Mashʼal-2
- Full name: Mashʼal-2
- Founded: 2005
- Ground: SC Mubarek
- Capacity: 1,000
- Manager: Diyorbek Mirzaboev
- League: Uzbekistan First League
- 2016: 9th
Home colours	Away colours

FC Mashʼal-2 (Uzbek: Машъал-Академия) is an Uzbekistann association football club based in Mubarek. Mashʼal-2 acts as the farm club of Mashʼal Mubarek. Currently it plays in First League.

== History ==
The club was formed in 2005 under name Yangiyer. Since 2010 club participates in league as Mashʼal Akademiya. Mashʼal-2 is feeder of main team. Farm clubs in Uzbekistan play in the same football pyramid as their senior team rather than a separate league. But farm teams cannot play in the same division as their senior team. Feeder teams are also permitted to participate in Uzbekistani Cup.

In 2009 Mashal-2 finished runners-up in Uzbekistan First League, but was not eligible to promote to top division as Mashʼal Mubarek was playing in Uzbek League.

Formers players of Mashʼal-2 Ganisher Kholmurodov and Sardor Rahkmanov played in 2011 FIFA U-17 World Cup for Uzbekistan U-17 team.

Name changes

- 2005: Yangiyer
- 2006–2007: Mashʼal-2
- 2008–2009: Mashʼal-Akademiya
- 2009: Mashʼal-Sport
- 2010–2013: Mashʼal-Akademiya
- 2014: Mashʼal-2

== Current squad ==
Squad for season 2011 Note: Flags indicate national team as defined under FIFA eligibility rules; some limited exceptions apply. Players may hold more than one non-FIFA nationality.

No.	Pos.	Nation	Player
—	GK	UZB	Ravshan Abdujabbarov
—	GK	UZB	Javokhir Ilyasov
—	GK	UZB	Ganisher Kholmurodov
—	DF	UZB	Mamurjon Abdullaev
—	DF	UZB	Akbar Khotamov
—	DF	UZB	Dilshod Mamadjanov
—	DF	UZB	Timur Dubrovskiy
—	DF	UZB	Iskander Shoykulov
—	DF	UZB	Sardor Rahkmanov
—	DF	UZB	Qozim Akhmedjanov
—	DF	UZB	Yunus Ochildiev
—	DF	UZB	Jasur Azimov
—	MF	UZB	Fayoz Azimqulov

No.	Pos.	Nation	Player
—	MF	UZB	Ildar Irgashev
—	MF	PER	Julian Tapara
—	MF	UZB	Mirzobedil Juraev
—	MF	UZB	Sirojiddin Rakhmatullaev
—	MF	UZB	Asatillo Ergashev
—	MF	UZB	Ulugbek Amindjanov
—	MF	UZB	Oybek Ishimov
—	MF	UZB	Sardor Abduraimov
—	FW	UZB	Timur Bekchanov
—	FW	UZB	Ikhtiyor Toshpulatov
—	FW	UZB	Kholmurod Kholmurodov
—	FW	UZB	Uyghun Bobonazarov
—	FW	UZB	Maradona Safarov

== Honours ==
- Uzbekistan First League runners-up: 2009

== Managerial history ==
- (Uzbekistan) Alexander Khomyakov (2011–2012)
- (Uzbekistan) Dilshod Andaev (2014–)
- (Uzbekistan) Diyorbek Mirzaboev (February 2017- )
