= FC Nasaf-2 =

Nasaf-2 Qarshi
- Full name: Nasaf-2 Qarshi
- Nickname(s): The Dragons
- Ground: Nasaf-2 Stadium
- Capacity: 15,000
- Head Coach: Rakhmatulla Muhammedrakhimov
- League: Uzbekistan First League
- 2012: 7th
| Home colours | Away colours |

FC Nasaf-2 Qarshi (Uzbek: Насаф-2 Карши) is an Uzbekistann association football club based in Qarshi. Nasaf-2 is the farm club of Nasaf Qarshi. Currently it plays in First League.

== History ==
Nasaf-2 was formed with intention to feed and provide Nasaf Qarshi with young successful players. Club plays in First League, conference West and participate in Uzbek Cup.

On 20 July 2012, the current head coach of Nasaf-2, Shuhrat Toshpulatov was appointed as assistant coach of Nasaf Youth team and resigned his position at Nasaf-2. Club had appointed Rakhmatulla Muhammedrakhimov as new head coach.

== Managerial history ==
| Name | Nat | Period |
|---|---|---|
| Zoir Turaqulov | (Uzbekistan) | 2011 |
| Shuhrat Toshpulatov | (Uzbekistan) | 2012 |
| Rakhmatulla Muhammedrakhimov | (Uzbekistan) | 2012– |
