= FK Yangiyer =

- Full name: Yangiyer futbol klubi
- Ground: Yangiyer Stadium
- Capacity: 6,000
- Manager: Hayrullo Abdiev
- League: Uzbekistan First League
- 2012: 4th

FK Yangiyer (Uzbek: Yangiyer) is an Uzbekistani football club based in Yangiyer, Sirdaryo Province.

== Achievements ==
- Uzbek Cup:

Runners-up (1): 1994

== Managerial history ==
Name	Nat	Period
Gennadi Krasnitsky	(Soviet Union)	1972
Gennadi Krasnitsky	(Soviet Union)	1977
Bahodir Davlatov	(Uzbekistan)	2011
Hayrullo Abdiev	(Uzbekistan)	2012 –
