= Uzbekistan Second League =

- Organising body: Uzbekistan Professional Football League and Uzbekistan Football Federation
- Founded: 1992; 34 years ago
- Country: Uzbekistan
- Confederation: AFC
- Number of clubs: 16
- Level on pyramid: 4
- Promotion to: Uzbekistan First League
- Relegation to: Uzbekistan Regional Championships
- Domestic cup: Uzbekistan Cup
- League cup: Uzbekistan PFL Cup
- Broadcaster(s): (Uzbekistan) NTRCU Regional Channels
- Website: pfl.uz
- Current: 2025 Uzbekistan Second League

Uzbekistan Second League (Uzbek: O'zbekiston Ikkinchi ligasi / Ўзбекистон Иккинчи лигаси; Russian: Вторая лига Узбекистана) is the fourth level (after the Super League, Pro League and Pro B League) football league in Uzbekistan.

Held under the auspices of Uzbekistan Professional Football League (UzPFL), and is controlled by the Uzbekistan Football Federation (UFF) and its regional offices.

The tournament is usually held in late November or early December. It involves the winners of the regional leagues of Uzbekistan, winners of some of the most strong regional and city leagues in the country, as well as the team took the last place in the Pro League of Uzbekistan (until 2017 this league was called the Uzbekistan First League).

The winners (usually two to four teams) gain promotion to the Uzbekistan Pro League. In the first round of the league, teams are usually divided into groups and the group winners go through to the next round; a round of playoffs. The winners of the round of playoffs gain promotion to the Pro League. In some seasons the teams were split into groups and the group winners, along with the team who finished in second place, gained promotion to a league of higher rank (regional and city championships).

Season	Winners
1992	Sitora Bukhara, Kimyagar Chirchiq
1993	No data
1994	Chilanzar, Navruz Namangan, Madaniyat Qibray, Tegirmanchi
1995	Shurtan, Tuqimachi, Bukalik
1996	No data
1997	Sementchi, Tadbirkor
1998	No data
1999	No data
2000	No data
2001	No data
2002	No data
2003	Ghallakor, Yangiyer, Tupalang, Shaykhantakhur, Papfen
2004	Kokand 1912, AOZK, Nasaf 2, Neftchi Jarkurghan
2005	Kasansay, Quruvchi Tashkent, Miyankal, Aqtepa Tashkent
2006	Lokomotiv BFK, O. Akbarov Yaypan, Ramitan, NOZK
2007	No data
2008	Spartak Tashkent, Neftchi Jarkurghan, Internat Qarshi, Quruvchi Bukhara
2009	Khiva, Lokomotiv BFK, Gulistan, Kasansay
2010	Registan Samarqand, Yerkurghan, Chilanzar Pakhtakor, Yangiyer
2011	Zamin, Neftchi Khamza, Yuzhanin Navoi, Bukhara 2
2012	Lokomotiv BFK, Khotira 79, Sherdor Samarqand, Spartak Bukhara
2013	Abad Tashkent, Geofizika Tashkent, Ghijduvan, Mashal FSH
2014	Yazyavan Lachinlari, Sementchi, Nasaf FSH, NGPI
2015	Nurafshan Bukhara, Ghijduvan, Lokomotiv BFK, Naryn Haqqulabad
2016	Neftchi Surkhandarya, Ghallaaral, Yangiyer, Istiqlal Ferghana
2017	No data
