= Uzbekistan First League =

- Organising body: Uzbekistan Professional Football League
- Founded: 2020; 6 years ago
- First season: 2020
- Country: Uzbekistan
- Confederation: AFC
- Number of clubs: 29 (2026)
- Level on pyramid: 3
- Promotion to: Uzbekistan Pro League
- Relegation to: Uzbekistan Second League
- Domestic cup: Uzbekistan Cup
- League cup: Uzbekistan League Cup
- Broadcaster: (Uzbekistan) NTRCU Regional Channels
- Sponsors: Artel Electronics; UzCard; Apex Insurance; Coca-Cola Bottlers Uzbekistan; Yandex Uzbekistan
- Website: pfl.uz
- Current: 2026 Uzbekistan First League

Uzbekistan First League (Uzbek: O'zbekiston Birinchi ligasi / Ўзбекистон Биринчи Лигаси; Russian: Первая лига Узбекистана) is the third level (after the Super League and Pro League) association football league in Uzbekistan. The division is run by Uzbekistan Professional Football League (UzPFL).

== History ==
From its inception in 1992 until 2017, the second-ranking football championship in Uzbekistan was known as Uzbekistan First League. Following the reform of the national championship, the second-ranking championship renamed to Uzbekistan Pro League. In 2020, Uzbekistan First League was reorganized into the third-ranking football championship in the country. The First League is organized by Uzbekistan Professional Football League. Participants of the First League annually participate in the qualifying round of the Uzbekistan Cup.

At the first league level, Uzbekistan State Security Service Cup has been held since 2021 as part of the “Five Initiative Olympics” in cooperation with State Security Service, Ministry of Sports, Youth Affairs Agency, Mahallas Association and Professional Football League.

Starting in 2022, Coca-Cola Students Cup mini-football tournament will be held among students of higher education institutions of Uzbekistan in cooperation with the Ministry of Internal Affairs, the Ministry of Higher Education, Science and Innovation, and Professional Football League.

From 2018 to 2019 it was called Uzbekistan Pro-B League (Uzbek: O'zbekiston Pro-B ligasi / Ўзбекистон Про-Б лигаси).

== Structure of the league ==
On 21 November 2017 according to the UzPFL management decision the Uzbekistan First League was officially renamed to starting from the 2018 season. The league has been reduced from 18 (2017) to 16 teams.

In 2020, Uzbekistan First League involved 16 teams in a double round system (28 rounds), home and away. The winner of Uzbekistan Pro-B League receives the permit in Uzbekistan Pro League, and the club took third place in the Pro League gets a place in the play-offs, consisting of two matches (home and away) where its opponent will be Pro-B League club, who took there the penultimate eleventh place. The winner of the playoffs gets a chance in Uzbekistan Pro League, and the losing club will start the new season in the First League Uzbekistan. The clubs finishing in last place in the First League, will start the season in the Uzbekistan Second League — the fourth level and the importance of football in the country.

== Regulations ==
The First League competition is formed based on the number of participating clubs. Currently, there are 16 participating clubs in the competition. The First League of Uzbekistan is held in a two-round system with a total of 30 rounds. In this, each club participates in 15 home and 15 away matches.

At the end of the season, the team that won the First League will start the new season in the Uzbekistan Pro League. The team that finished 2nd in the First League will participate in a play-off match against the team that finished 9th in the Uzbekistan Pro League to advance to the Pro League. According to the Competition Regulations of the Uzbekistan Professional Football League, the play-off match will be hosted by the club that finished second in the First League.

== All Winners ==
Season	Champion	Runner-up	Third place
2018	Nurafshon	Sherdor	Gijduvon
2019	Turon	Zomin	Yangiyer FC Lokomotiv BFK
2020	Yangiyer	Pakhtakor-Farm	Rubin
2021	Zomin	Gijduvon	Navbahor Farm
2022	Navbahor Farm	Aral	Pakhtakor-79
2023	Yangiyer	Jizzakh	Olympia
2024	Nasaf-2	Jizzakh	Olympia
2025	Lochin (west); Sementchi (east); Zamin (center)	BuxDU (west); Dustlik (sharq); Chigatoy (center)	Kattaqoʻrgʻon (west); Andijon FA (east); Ishtixon (center)

== Overall Table ==
Overall standings from 2018 to 2024 seasons.

Place	Team	Seasons	Played	Wins	Draws	Losses	Goals scored	Goals conceded	Goal difference	Points
1	Gʻijduvon	4	89	48	15	28	176	131	+45	159
2	Zaamin	3	72	49	7	16	172	86	+86	154
3	Rubin	3	77	40	20	17	148	81	+67	140
4	Lokomotiv BFK	5	123	39	12	72	203	275	-72	129
5	Pakhtakor	4	95	38	11	46	143	183	-40	125
6	Navbahor-2 Farm	3	63	37	11	14	119	75	+44	122
7	Bunyodkor-2	4	91	35	14	42	150	151	-1	119
8	Chigʻatoy	4	91	27	14	50	154	206	-52	95
9	Shahrixonchi	2	54	27	10	17	85	66	+19	91
10	Yangiyer	2	37	28	4	5	103	35	+68	88
11	Andijon-2	3	66	25	8	33	94	124	-30	83
12	Sherdor	1	32	20	4	8	79	42	+37	64
13	Turon	1	28	19	5	4	67	23	+44	62
14	Aral samali	2	37	17	7	13	67	61	+6	58
15	Aral Nukus	1	26	18	3	5	65	33	+32	57
16	Yozyovon	1	32	14	3	15	45	55	-10	45
17	Labsa	1	32	13	4	15	47	48	-1	43
18	Iftikhor	1	32	12	4	16	42	60	-18	40
19	Yashnobod		45	11	6	28	61	123	-62	39
20	Unired	1	26	11	5	10	45	40	+5	38
21	Neftgazmontaj	1	20	11	3	6	31	27	+4	36
22	Pakhtakor Farm	1	17	11	2	4	40	16	+24	35
23	Dustlik	1	26	9	6	11	33	39	-6	33
24	Kumkurgan	1	26	8	8	10	35	49	-14	32
25	Qizilqum-Farm	1	26	9	4	13	39	54	-15	31
26	Jizzakh-Bars	2	37	7	7	29	39	62	-23	31
27	Dostlik Oltiariq	2	26	9	0	17	45	58	-13	27
28	Nasaf-Farm	2	26	7	3	16	35	52	-17	24
29	Lochin	1	20	7	3	10	2	45	−43	24
30	Zirabuloq	2	32	6	2	24	37	89	-52	20
31	Jomboy	1	20	5	2	13	29	41	−12	17
32	Ittifoq-Navoiy	1	20	3	1	16	19	58	-39	10
33	Lochin-Qarshi	9	7	1	1	30	7	+23		22
34	BuxDU	8	7	1	0	23	5	+18		22
35	Kattaqoʻrgʻon	8	5	2	1	14	6	+8		17
36	Xorazm FA	9	5	1	3	14	9	+5		16
37	Aral akademiya	8	5	2	1	14	9	-3		12
38	Navoiy FA	8	2	1	5	8	18	-10		7
39	Qiziriq	9	1	3	5	6	14	-8		6
40	Buxoro FA	9	1	2	6	9	20	-11		5
41	Andijon FA	9	5	1	3	20	14	+6		16
42	OKMK Semurgʻ	9	4	2	3	22	16	+6		14
43	Namangan FA	9	3	1	5	13	14	-1		10
44	Bagʻdod	8	2	3	3	17	19	-2		9
45	Fargʻona FA	8	0	1	7	6	24	-18		1
46	Sirdayo FA	8	3	2	3	12	12	0		11
47	Toshkent VFA	9	2	2	5	5	18	-13		8
48	Jizzax FA	9	0	2	7	9	26	-17		2
49	Zamin	8	6	2	0	22	8	-14		20
50	Ishtixon	9	6	0	3	26	19	+7		18
51	Ahmedov	8	2	1	5	10	16	-6		7

== See also ==
- Uzbekistan Super League
- Uzbekistan Pro League
- Uzbekistan Second League
- Uzbekistan Cup
- Uzbekistan League Cup
