= List of football clubs in Uzbekistan =

This is a list of football clubs in Uzbekistan.

== Uzbekistan Super League ==
=== Super league teams 2025 season ===
| Club | Home city | Stadium | Finishing position last season |
|---|---|---|---|
| AGMK | Olmaliq | AGMK Stadium | 2nd |
| Andijan | Andijan | Bobur Arena | 9th |
| Bunyodkor | Tashkent | San Mamés | 10th |
| Buxoro | Buxoro | Buxoro Arena | 2nd in Pro League |
| Dinamo Samarqand | Samarqand | Dinamo Samarkand Stadium | 8th |
| Khorazm | Urgench | Xorazm Stadium | 6th in Pro League |
| Kokand 1912 | Kokand | Kokand Markaziy Stadium | 3rd in Pro League |
| Mash'al Mubarek | Muborak | Bahrom Vafoev Stadium | 1st in Pro League |
| Nasaf | Qarshi | Markaziy Stadium | 1st |
| Navbahor Namangan | Namangan | Navbahor Stadium | 4th |
| Neftchi Fergana | Fergana | Istiqlol Stadium | 5th |
| Pakhtakor Tashkent | Tashkent | Pakhtakor Central Stadium | 6th |
| Qizilqum Zarafshon | Navoiy | Markaziy Stadium | 11th |
| Shurtan | Gʻuzor | G'uzor Stadium | 4th in Pro League |
| Sogdiana Jizzakh | Jizzakh | Sogdiana Stadium | 3rd |
| Surkhon Termez | Termez | Markaziy Stadium | 7th |

== Uzbekistan Pro League ==
=== Pro league teams 2025 season ===
| Club | Home city | Stadium |
|---|---|---|
| Aral | Nukus | Turan Stadium |
| FarDU | Fergana | Istiqlol Stadium |
| Jayxun | Karakalpakstan | Nukus BO‘FA |
| Lokomotiv Tashkent | Tashkent | Lokomotiv Stadium |
| Olympic Tashkent | Tashkent | JAR Stadium |
| Olympic MobiUz | Tashkent | Friendship Stadium |

== Uzbekistan First League ==
=== First league teams 2025 season ===
==== West ====
- Aral akademiya
- BuxDU
- Buxoro FA
- Kattaqoʻrgʻon
- Lochin
- Nasaf Farm
- Navoiy FA
- Qiziriq
- Qumqoʻrgʻon-1977
- Xorazm FA

==== East ====
- Andijan FA
- Bog‘dod
- Doʻstlik Toshkent
- Fargʻona FA
- Lokomotiv BFK
- Namangan FA
- Navbahor Farm
- AGMK Semurg
- Pakhtakor Farm
- Sementchi

==== Central ====
- Ahmedov
- Bunyodkor Farm
- Chigʻatoy
- Ishtixon
- Jizzax FA
- Lokomotiv Farm
- Oqtepa
- Sirdaryo FA
- Toshkent VFA
- Zamin
