= Uzbekistan Pro League =

Uzbekistan Pro League O'zbekiston Pro Ligasi
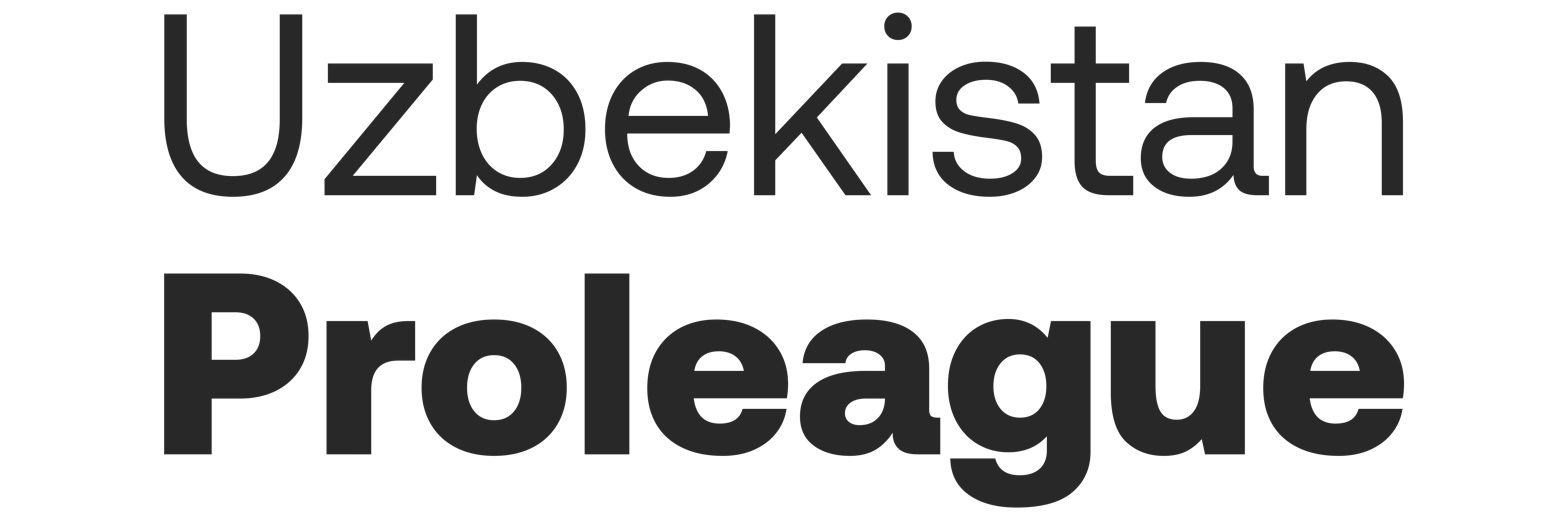
- Organising body: Uzbekistan Professional Football League
- Founded: 1992; 34 years ago, Reorganised in 2017; 9 years ago
- First season: 1992
- Country: Uzbekistan
- Confederation: AFC
- Number of clubs: 6
- Level on pyramid: 2
- Promotion to: Uzbekistan Super League
- Relegation to: Uzbekistan First League
- Domestic cup: Uzbekistan Cup
- League cup: Uzbekistan League Cup
- International cup: AFC Champions League
- Current champions: Mash'al Mubarek (2026)
- Most championships: Soghdiana and Kokand 1912 (3 times)
- Broadcasters: Uzreport TV and Futbol TV
- Sponsors: Coca-Cola; Artel; Apex Insurance; Uzcard; Macron; BMB Holding
- Website: pfl.uz
- Current: 2026

Uzbekistan Pro League (Uzbek: O'zbekiston Pro Ligasi) is a professional football league in Uzbekistan, and currently the second level after the Uzbekistan Super League.

The second-tier football competition in Uzbekistan was called the Uzbekistan First League from its establishment in 1992 until 2017. In 2018, following the reform of the national championships by the Uzbekistan Professional Football League (UzPFL), the Uzbekistan First League was renamed the Uzbekistan Pro League. Uzbekistan Pro League tournaments are organized by Uzbekistan Professional Football League.

The winner and runner-up of Uzbekistan Pro League gain direct promotion to the Uzbekistan Super League, while the third-placed club in the Pro League participates in a playoff match against the team that finished 12th in the Super League. According to Uzbekistan Professional Football League Competition Regulations, this playoff match is held at the home ground of the Pro League team. At the end of the season, the club that finishes last in the Pro League is relegated to the Uzbekistan First League for the following season.

Pro League participants also compete annually in the Uzbekistan Cup and the Uzbekistan League Cup.

== History ==
Uzbekistan Football Championship has been held since 1992. The composition and number of teams in the competition have changed over time. In the inaugural season of the championship, 16 teams participated. At the end of the league tournament, "Shifokor" from Gulistan and "Politodel-Ruor" from Tashkent region earned promotion to the Higher League. The number of participants in the competition varied from year to year. In the 1995 season, the league was divided into eastern and western regions for the first time, and the top-ranked teams from each region were combined in the second stage. A total of 26 teams participated throughout the league season. The 1997 season went down in history as the year with the highest number of participating teams in league history. In that season, 27 teams competed in the league.

In 2018, 16 teams participated in the Uzbekistan Pro League in a two-stage system (30 rounds), home and away. In 2019, the Uzbekistan Pro League was divided into leagues A and B, with 24 clubs playing in a 4-round system (28 rounds, 2 home and away). From 2020, the division of the Uzbekistan Pro League into leagues A and B was terminated and transformed into a single league consisting of 10 teams, and the Uzbekistan First League (a 3rd tier league in terms of importance in the football structure) was established in place of the B League. In 2024, the number of participating teams in the Pro League was 6. In 2025, 6 teams will also participate.

On 21 November 2017 according to the UzPFL management decision the Uzbekistan First League was officially renamed to Uzbekistan Pro League starting from the 2018 season. The league has been reduced from 18 (2017) to 16 teams.

== Structure of the league ==
=== Regular season ===
The regulations changed depending on the number of participating teams in each league season. The updated preliminary regulations were first announced in 2017. The number of participants in the 2024 Uzbekistan Super League was reduced to 8 teams, and changes to the regulations were announced. According to the regulations, the clubs that take first and second places will receive a direct ticket to the Uzbekistan Super League. The team that finishes eighth at the end of the season in the LI will be relegated to the First League.

Teams get three points for a win and one point for a draw. Points are not awarded for defeat. The teams are ranked by total points. If the teams have equal points, the rules apply in the following order:

- by the results of the mutual match(es);
- by the results of points earned in matches;
- by the difference in goals scored and conceded in matches;
- by the difference in goals scored and conceded in all matches;
- by the number of goals scored in all matches;
- by the number of goals scored in the opponent's field in all matches;
- by the number of wins achieved in all matches;
- by the inverse of the number of defeats in all matches;
- by the number of away victories achieved in all matches;
- by the inverse of the number of home defeats in all matches.

All participating clubs of the Pro League also have a U-19 team in their structure. These teams participate in the overall Uzbekistan U-19 Championship alongside the U-19 squads of Super League clubs.

In 2018 in the Pro League Uzbekistan involved 16 teams in a double round system (30 rounds), home and away. The winner of the Uzbekistan Pro League receives the permit in the Uzbekistan Super League, and the club took second place in the Pro League gets a place in the play-offs, consisting of two matches (home and away) where his opponent will be the Super League club, who took there the penultimate eleventh place. The winner of the playoffs gets a chance in Super League Uzbekistan, and the losing club will start the new season in the Pro League Uzbekistan. The clubs finishing in last place in the Pro League, will start the season in the Uzbekistan Pro-B League — the third level and the importance of football in the country.

=== Playoffs ===
At the end of the league season, the teams that took third and fourth places will play playoff matches for a spot in the Uzbekistan Super League with the teams that took 12th and 13th places in the 2024 Uzbekistan Super League.

== Teams ==
Club	Coach	Location	Stadium	Capacity	Kit sponsor	Shirt sponsor
Dinamo	(Russia) Sergey Lushan	Samarkand	Dinamo Samarkand Stadium	16,000	Joma	Agromir Buildings
Istiqlol	(Uzbekistan) Sergey Lebedev	Fergana	Fargona Stadium	11,000	Adidas	Stroy Montaj Invest
Khorazm	(Uzbekistan) Maksud Karimov	Urgench	Xorazm Stadium	13,500	Macron	
Neftchi Fergana	(Uzbekistan) Abdusmad Durmanov	Fergana	Fargona Stadium; Istiklol Stadium	11,000; 22,000	Joma	FNQIZ
Oqtepa	(Uzbekistan) Yaroslav Krushelnitskiy	Tashkent	Stadion Oq-tepa	2,000	Nike	
Shurtan	(Uzbekistan) Asror Aliqulov	G‘uzor	G'uzor Stadium	7,000	Sport-Saller	Uzbekneftegaz
Turon	(Uzbekistan) Islom Ismoilov	Yaypan	Uzbekistan Stadium	4,500	Adidas	Turon Eco Cement
Zaamin	(Uzbekistan) Jakhongir Jiyamurodov	Zaamin	Zaamin Stadium	5,000	Kappa	

== Winners and promotions by season ==
Season	Winners	Runner-up	3rd place	Top scorer
1992	Shifokor Guliston	Politotdel	Bakht	(Uzbekistan) Oleg Shatskikh (Politotdel, 25 goals)
1993	FK Atlaschi	Surkhan Termez	Baghdad	(Uzbekistan) Igor Burov (FK Atlaschi, 28 goals)
1994	Mash'al Mubarek	FK Samarqand-Dinamo	Kushan	(Uzbekistan) Khamza Jabbarov (FK Samarqand-Dinamo, 24 goals)
1995	Dinamo Urganch	Kosonsoy	Zarafshon Navoi	(Uzbekistan) Zakir Narzullaev (Diyor Bulungur, 24 goals)
1996	Zarafshon Navoi	Chilonzor Tashkent	Progress	(Uzbekistan) Aleksey Zhdanov (Chilonzor Tashkent, 50 goals)
1997	Temiryo'lchi Qo'qon	Metallurg Bekabad	Istiqlol Tashkent	(Uzbekistan) Shavkat Ismailov (Shurtan Guzar, 29 goals) (Uzbekistan) Ghayrat Odilov (Lochin, 29 goals)
1998	Yangiyer	FK Samarqand-Dinamo	Kimyogar Chirchiq	(Uzbekistan) Bakhtiyor Davlatov (FK Yangiyer, 39 goals)
1999^{1}	Semurg Angren	Kimyogar Chirchiq	Qizilqum	(Uzbekistan) Eldor Kasymov (Semurg Angren, 36 goals)
2000	Akademiya Tashkent	Mash'al Mubarek	Sementchi	(Uzbekistan) Bakhtiyor Davlatov (Mash'al Mubarek, 35 goals)
2001	Temiryo'lchi Qo'qon	Mash'al Mubarek	Sementchi	(Uzbekistan) Abduvosit Azizov (Mash'al Mubarek, 21 goals)
2002	FK Guliston	Sementchi	Angren	(Uzbekistan) Ulughbek Utarov (Sitora Bukhara, 19 goals)
2003	Sogdiana Jizzakh	Lokomotiv Tashkent	NBU Osiyo	(Uzbekistan) Qobil Aliqulov (Sogdiana Jizzakh, 23 goals)
2004	Shurtan Guzar	Topalang Sariosiyo	NBU Osiyo	(Uzbekistan) Ravshan Bozorov (Topalang Sariosiyo, 44 goals)
2005	Andijan	Xorazm FK Urganch	NBU Osiyo	(Uzbekistan) Pavel Pavlov (Sementchi, 29 goals)
2006	Kuruvchi	Vobkent FK	Mashʼal-2	(Uzbekistan) Ilkhom Khamdamov (Vobkent FK, 42 goals)
2007	Sogdiana Jizzakh	Uz-Dong-Ju Andijon	Mashʼal-2	(Uzbekistan) Vladimir Gavrilov (Oqtepa, 27 goals)
2008	Xorazm FK Urganch	Dustlik Jizzakh	Sokol Uchkuduk	(Uzbekistan) Muiddin Mamazulunov (O.Akbarov, 23 goals)
2009^{2}	Bunyodkor Qo'qon 1912	Mash'al Sport	Zarafshon Navoi	(Uzbekistan) Aziz Asimov (NBU Osiyo, 20 goals) (Uzbekistan) Mansur Abdullaev (Zarafshon NCZ, 20 goals)
2010	FK Buxoro	Sogdiana Jizzakh	Guliston	(Uzbekistan) Abdulatif Juraev (Chust-Pakhtakor/FK Buxoro, 27 goals)
2011	Lokomotiv Tashkent	Guliston	Yangiyer	(Uzbekistan) Zaynitdin Tadjiyev (Lokomotiv Tashkent, 30 goals)
2012	Sogdiana Jizzakh	Guliston^{3}	NBU Osiyo	(Uzbekistan) Khurshid Yuldoshev (Sogdiana Jizzakh, 26 goals)
2013	Mash’al Mubarek	Andijan	Kokand 1912	(Uzbekistan) Firdavs Asadov (Spartak Bukhoro, 21 goals)
2014	Shurtan Guzar	Kokand 1912	Obod	(Uzbekistan) Viktor Klishin (Shurtan Guzar, 40 goals)
2015	Obod	Oqtepa	Uz-Dong-Ju Andijan	(Uzbekistan) Alisher Azizov (Obod, 26 goals)
2016	Dinamo Samarqand	Norin	Sementchi	(Uzbekistan) Navruz Khaipov (Orol Nukus, 30 goals)
2017	Sementchi	Istiqlol Fergana	FC Andijon	(Uzbekistan) Shakhboz Ubaydullaev (Mashʼal-2, 33 goals)
2018	Andijon	Mash'al Mubarek	Istiqlol Fergana	(Uzbekistan) Shakhboz Jumabayev (FC Andijon, 16 goals)
2019	Mash'al Mubarek	Istiqlol Fergana	Oqtepa	(Uzbekistan) Pavel Purishkin (FC Oqtepa, 19 goals)
2020	Turon	Neftchi Fergana	Dinamo Samarqand	(Uzbekistan) Doston Toshmatov (Neftchi Fergana, 12 goals)
2021	Neftchi Fergana	Dinamo Samarqand	Olympic	(Serbia) Marko Obradović Neftchi Fergana/ (Uzbekistan) Ruzimboy Akhmedov Dinamo Samarqand (12 goals)
2022	Andijon	Buxoro	Turon	(Uzbekistan) Ruzimboy Akhmedov (Buxoro, 23 goals)
2023	Lokomotiv	Dinamo	Kokand 1912	(Uzbekistan) Anvar Khojimirzaev (Dinamo, 23 goals)
2024	Mash'al	Buxoro	Kokand 1912	(Uzbekistan) Khumoyun Murtozoyev (Dinamo, 16 goals)
2025	Lokomotiv Tashkent	Aral Nukus	Olimpik-Farm	(Uzbekistan) Muhriddin Zoirov (Lokomotiv Tashkent, 11 goals)

1:In the season 1999 additionally to the first second teams also promoted to Uzbek League: Qizilqum Zarafshon and Aral Nukus.
2:The winner and runner-up team of season 2009 did not promoted to Uzbek League because the number of teams of Top League was reduced from 16 to 14 for upcoming 2010 season.
3:FK Guliston could not enter the 2012 Uzbek League as runner-up team and was replaced by Qizilqum Zarafshon because of financial problems.

== Coaches of promoted teams ==
Season	Team	Coach
1992	Shifokor Guliston	Riza Mallaev
1992	Politotdel	Vladimir Bondarenko
1993	FK Atlaschi	Aleksey Stepanov
1993	Surkhon Termez	Batyr Kashkenbaev
1994	Mash'al Mubarek	Boris Serostanov
1994	FK Samarqand-Dinamo	Rustam Istamov
1995	Dinamo Urganch	Bahodyr Mirzaev
1995	FK Kosonsoy	Vladimir Desyatchikov
1996	Zarafshan Navoi	Usmon Asqaraliev
1996	Chilonzor Tashkent	Rauf Inileev
1997	Temiryo'lchi Qo'qon	Bakhrom Khakimov
1997	Metallurg Bekabad	Yakov Kaprov
1998	Yangiyer	Bakhrom Davlatov
1998	FK Samarqand-Dinamo	Berador Abduraimov
1999^{4}	Semurg Angren	Rafael Fabarisov
1999^{4}	Kimyogar Chirchiq	Alexander Ivankov
1999^{4}	Qizilqum Zarafshon	Vladimir Desyatchikov
1999^{4}	Aral Nukus	Quvvat Tureev
2000	Akademiya Tashkent	Vladimir Zhukovkiy
2001	Temiryo'lchi Qo'qon	Avhat Abdulin
2001	Mash'al Mubarek	Bakhtiyor Babaev

In the season 1999 four teams promoted to Uzbek League

Season	Team	Coach
2002	FK Guliston	Vladimir Zhukovkiy
2002	Sementchi Kuvasoy	Tokhir Kapadze
2003	Sogdiana Jizzakh	Suyun Murtazaev
2003	Lokomotiv Tashkent	Andrey Miklyaev
2004	Shurtan Guzar	Shamil Tolibov
2004	Topalang Sariosiyo	Vladimir Bordyuzha
2005	FK Andijan	Islam Akhmedov
2005	Xorazm FK Urganch	Quvvat Tureev
2006	Kuruvchi	Khikmat Irgashev
2006	Vobkent FK	Genadiy Kochnev
2007	Sogdiana Jizzakh	Furqat Esanbaev
2007	Uz-Dong-Ju Andijon	Islam Akhmedov
2008	Xorazm FK Urganch	Valijon Sultanov
2008	Dustlik Jizzakh	Sirojiddin Ergashev
2009	Bunyodkor Qo'qon 1912	
2009	Mash'al-Sport	
2010	FK Buxoro	Genadiy Kochnev
2010	Sogdiana Jizzakh	
2011	Lokomotiv Tashkent	Rustam Muqimov
2011	FK Guliston	Alexandr Lushin

Season	Team	Coach
2012	Sogdiana Jizzakh	Davron Fayziev
2012	FK Guliston	Bakhtiyor Ashurmatov
2013	Mash'al Mubarek	Alexander Khomyakov
2013	FK Andijan	Azamat Abduraimov
2014	Shurtan Guzar	Mukhtor Kurbonov
2014	Kokand 1912	Rustam Abdullaev
2015	Obod Tashkent	Khayrulla Abdiev
2016	Dinamo Samarqand	Ilkhom Sharipov
