= 2021 Uzbekistan Pro League =

Uzbekistan Pro League
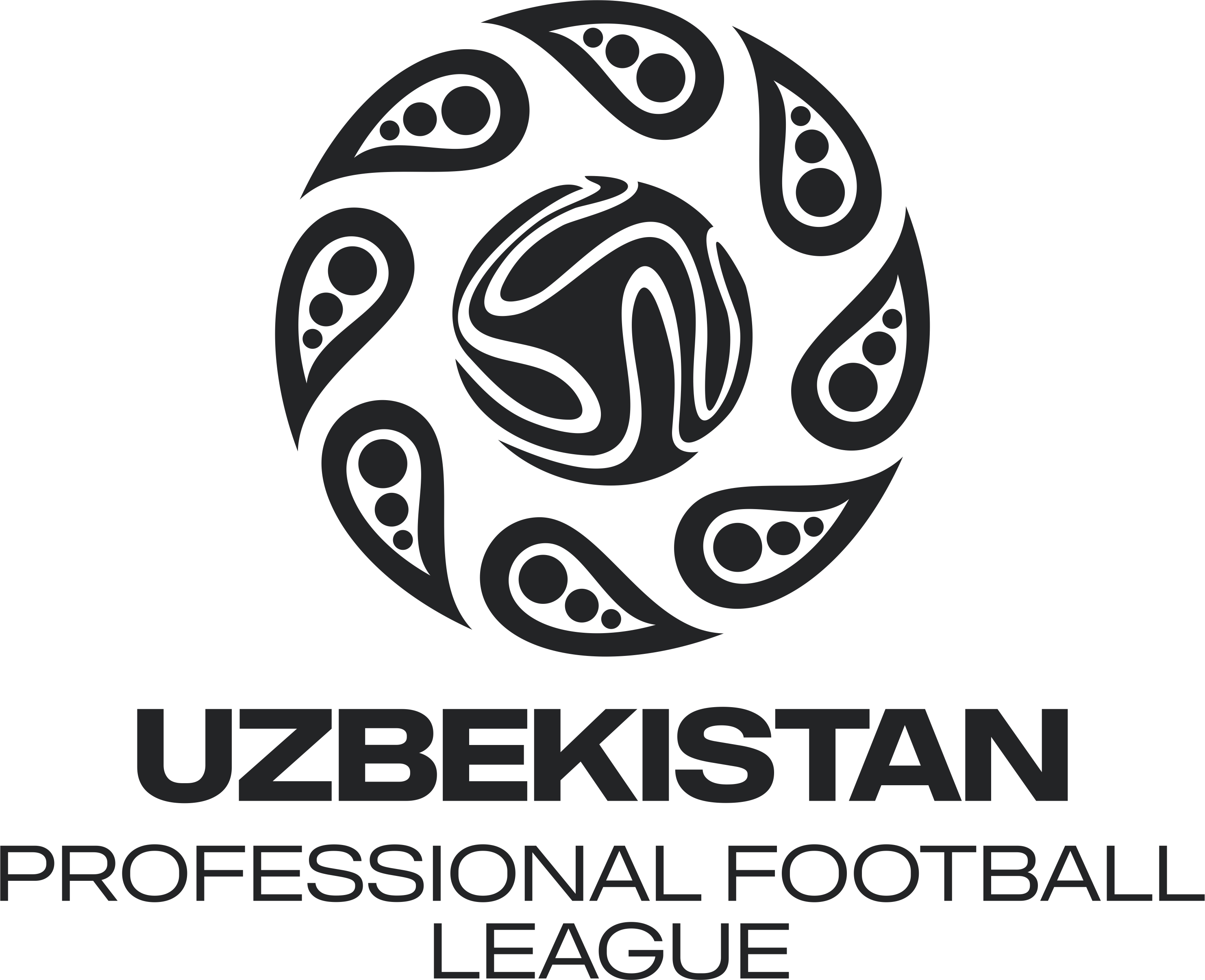
- Season: 2021
- Champions: Neftchi
- Relegated: Oqtepa
- Matches: 80
- Goals: 234 (2.93 per match)
- Top goalscorer: Marko Obradović (12 goals); Ruzimboy Akhmedov (12 goals)
- Biggest home win: Neftchi 7–0 Oqtepa (May 22, 2022)
- Biggest away win: Olympic 0–6 Shurtan (April 12, 2021)
- Highest scoring: Khorazm 5–2 Yangiyer (September 12, 2021)
- Longest winning run: Neftchi
- Longest losing run: Shurtan
- Highest attendance: 8818 (24 September 2021, Neftchi – Olympic)
- Lowest attendance: 1 (22 March 2021, Neftchi – Olympic)
- All statistics correct as of December 1, 2021.

2021 Uzbekistan Pro League (Uzbek: Футбол бўйича 2021-йилги Ўзбекистон Про лигаси) was a 30th second-level division competition of Uzbekistan Professional Football League. It was held from April to November 2021. Winner of the tournament - Neftchi qualified for the 2022 Uzbekistan Super League.

== Clubs ==
T/r	Club	City	Province (province)	Stadium	Capacity
1	Buxoro	Buxoro	Buxoro	Buxoro Arena	22500
2	Dinamo	Samarqand	Samarqand	Dinamo	13 800
3	Istiqlol	Fargʻona	Fargʻona	Istiqlol	20 000
4	Neftchi	Fargʻona	Fargʻona	Istiqlol	20 000
5	Oqtepa	Tashkent	Tashkent	Oqtepa	2000
6	Aral Samalı PFK	Nukus	Karakalpakstan	Turon	9300
7	Olimpik	Tashkent	Tashkent	JAR	8460
8	Xorazm	Urganch	Xorazm	Xorazm	13 500
9	Yangier FK	Yangiyer	Sirdaryo	Markaziy	6600
10	Shoʻrtan	Gʻuzor	Qashqadaryo	Gʻuzor	7000

== Foreign players ==
Club	Footballer 1	Footballer 2	Footballer 3	Footballer 4	AFC Footballer	Former players	Ref
Buxoro	(Serbia) Marko Milić	(Turkmenistan) (Russia) Rahat Japarov	(Tajikistan) Tohir Malodustov				
Dinamo	(Ukraine) Mykhaylo Udod	(Ukraine) Oleg Marchuk	(Ukraine) Dmytro Sydorenko				
Istiqlol							
Neftchi	(Montenegro) (Serbia) Marko Obradović	(Serbia) Aleksandar Ješić	(Serbia) Darko Stanojević				
Oqtepa	(Nigeria) Sunday Song	(Colombia) Juan Becerra	(Brazil) Carvalho Da Silva	(Nigeria) Samuel Opeh			
Aral samali							
Olimpik							
Xorazm							
Yangier	(Burkina Faso) Faysal Traore	(Cameroon) Landry Nzimen Chamedjeu	(Cameroon) Mbeke Siebatcheu	(Cameroon) Jerome Mpacko Etame			
Shoʻrtan							

== Tournament ==
"Oqtepa" and "Istiqlol" are out of the tournament. The results of these teams were annulled because they did not play half of their scheduled matches.

=== First stage ===
Pos	Team	Pld	W	D	L	GF	GA	GD	Pts	Promotion, qualification or relegation
1	Neftchi	14	11	1	2	34	7	+27	34	Chempionlik guruhi
2	Dinamo	14	9	1	4	22	20	+2	28	Chempionlik guruhi
3	Buxoro	14	7	3	4	22	14	+8	24	Chempionlik guruhi
4	Olimpik	14	6	4	4	24	11	+13	22	Chempionlik guruhi
5	Xorazm	14	3	6	5	21	23	−2	15	Omon qolish guruhi
6	Yangiyer	14	4	2	8	12	28	−16	14	Omon qolish guruhi
7	Aral Samalı PFK	14	3	4	7	15	27	−12	13	Omon qolish guruhi
8	Shoʻrtan Gʻuzor	14	2	1	11	5	33	−28	7	Omon qolish guruhi
9	Oqtepa	0	0	0	0	0	0	0	0	Musoboqada ishtirokini toʻxtatdi
10	Istiqlol	0	0	0	0	0	0	0	0	Musoboqada ishtirokini toʻxtatdi

Updated to match(es) played on July 2021. Source: Uzbekistan Professional Football League
Rules for classification: 1) Points; 2) Head-to-head points; 3) Goal difference; 4) Total goals scored; 5) Goal difference; 6) Goals scored;.

O — games, G — wins, D — draws, M — losses, UG — goals scored, O'G — goals conceded, ± — goal difference, O — points

==== Results table ====
Home \ Away	NEF	DIN	BUX	OLY	KHO	YAN	ARA	SHU
Neftchi	—	6–0	2–0	0–0	5–1	2–0	4–0	2–0
Dinamo	0–1	—	3–1	1–0	4–3	3–0	3–2	2–0
Buxoro	2–0	1–1	—	0–1	2–1	3–0	4–0	3–0
Olimpik	3–0	1–2	0–2	—	1–1	2–1	4–0	5–0
Xorazm	0–3	1–0	1–1	1–1	—	5–2	1–1	4–0
Yangiyer	0–3	1–2	1–0	2–0	0–0	—	2–1	0–1
Aral Samalı PFK	0–2	2–1	2–2	1–1	1–1	1–2	—	3–1
Shoʻrtan Gʻuzor	1–4	0–1	0–1	0–6	2–1	0–0	0–1	—

Updated to match(es) played on 22 December 2021. Source: Uzbekistan Professional Football League
Legend: Blue = home team win; Yellow = draw; Red = away team win.

=== Second stage ===
Pos	Team	Pld	W	D	L	GF	GA	GD	Pts	Promotion, qualification or relegation
1	Neftchi	20	14	3	3	45	15	+30	45	Qualification to Super League
2	Dinamo	20	11	2	7	29	27	+2	35	Qualification to Super League
3	Olimpik	20	9	4	7	38	24	+14	31	Qualification to Super League Play-off
4	Buxoro	20	9	4	7	22	14	+8	31	

Updated to match(es) played on Noyabr 2021-yil. Source: Uzbekistan Professional Football League
Rules for classification: 1) Points; 2) Head-to-head points; 3) Goal difference; 4) Total goals scored; 5) Goal difference; 6) Goals scored.

==== Results table ====
Home \ Away	NEF	DIN	BUX	OLY
Neftchi	—	2–1	1–1	3–2
Dinamo	1–1	—	1–2	5–1
Buxoro	1–4	0–2	—	3–2
Olimpik	2–0	2–1	5–0	—

Updated to match(es) played on November 2021. Source: Uzbekistan Professional Football League
Legend: Blue = home team win; Yellow = draw; Red = away team win.

== Play-off ==
A play-off match for a place in the Super League between the club that finished 3rd in the Pro League and the club that finished 12th in the Super League.

December 2, 2021	Olympic	3–1	Mashʼal	Tashkent
15:00 (UTC+5)	Otabek Joʻraqoʻziyev 62'; Temur Mamasidiqov 75', 77'		Sirojiddin Qoʻziyev 57'	Stadium: Paxtakor; Attendance: 2150; Referee: Rahimbek Karimov
Note: A playoff match was held between Olympic, which took 3rd place in the Pro League, and Mashʼal, which finished the season in 12th place in the Super League. In it, Olympic defeated Mashʼal 2:1 and qualified for the Super League. Mashʼal will participate in the Pro League in the 2022 season.
