= 2019 Uzbekistan Pro League =

Uzbekistan Pro League
- Season: 2019
- Champions: Mash'al Mubarek
- Promoted: Mash'al Mubarek
- Relegated: Sherdor; Iftikhor
- Matches: 112
- Goals: 369 (3.29 per match)
- Top goalscorer: Pavel Purishkin (19 goals)

The 2019 Uzbekistan Pro League is the 28th since its establishment. The competition started on 19 March 2019.

== Teams ==
Location of teams in 2019 Uzbekistan Pro League

Club	Coach	Location	Stadium	Capacity	Kit sponsor	Shirt sponsor
Iftikhor	(Uzbekistan) Khayrullo Mirzajonov	Oltiariq	Oltiariq Central Stadium	500	Adidas	
Istiqlol	(Uzbekistan) Sergey Lebedev	Fergana	Fargona Stadium	22,000	Nike	
Khorazm	(Uzbekistan) Alexander Ezhov	Urgench	Xorazm Stadium	13,500	Joma	
Mash'al	(Uzbekistan) Asror Aliqulov	Mubarek	Bahrom Vafoev Stadium	13,000	Saller	Uzbekneftegaz
Neftchi Fergana	(Uzbekistan) Abdusamat Durmonov	Fergana	Fargona Stadium	22,000	Joma	FNQIZ
Oqtepa	(Uzbekistan) Ravshan Bozorov	Tashkent	Stadion Oq-tepa	2,000	Nike	Tashkent City
Sherdor	(Uzbekistan) Bakhtiyor Sattorov	Samarkand	Samarkand Stadium	13,800	Joma	
Shurtan	(Uzbekistan) Sergei Kovshov	G‘uzor	G'uzor Stadium	7,000	Saller	Uzbekneftegaz

=== Foreign Players ===
Club	Player 1	Player 2	Player 3	Player 4
Iftikhor				
Istiqlol				
Khorazm				
Mash'al Mubarek				
Neftchi Fergana				
Oqtepa				
Sherdor				
Shurtan				

== League table ==
Pos	Team	Pld	W	D	L	GF	GA	GD	Pts	Promotion, qualification or relegation
1	Mash'al	28	16	7	5	49	24	+25	55	Promotion to 2020 Uzbekistan Super League
2	Istiqlol	28	16	5	7	61	28	+33	53	
3	Oqtepa	28	16	3	9	59	42	+17	51	
4	Shurtan	28	15	3	10	56	36	+20	48	
5	Neftchi Fergana	28	15	3	10	37	26	+11	48	
6	Khorazm	28	14	5	9	55	37	+18	47	
7	Sherdor	28	4	2	22	36	73	−37	14	Relegation to Uzbekistan Pro-B League
8	Iftikhor	28	1	2	25	16	103	−87	5	Relegation to Uzbekistan Pro-B League

Source: PFL.uz
Rules for classification: 1) Points; 2) Head-to-head points; 3) Head-to-head goal difference; 4) Head-to-head goals scored; 5) Goal difference; 6) Goals scored; .

== Goalscorers ==
As of November 2019

#	Player	Club	Goals
1	(Uzbekistan) Pavel Purishkin	FC Oqtepa	19
2	(Uzbekistan) Sherzod Temirov	Shurtan Guzar	17
4	(Uzbekistan) Anvar Khojimirzaev	Istiqlol	13
5	(Uzbekistan) Temur Bekchanov	Khorazm	13
6	(Uzbekistan) Sardor Sotvoldiev	Istiqlol	12
6	(Uzbekistan) Jasur Kholturaev	Shurtan Guzar	12
