= 2020 Uzbekistan Pro League =

Uzbekistan Pro League
- Season: 2020
- Champions: Bukhara
- Matches: 80
- Goals: 195 (2.44 per match)
- Top goalscorer: Khumoyun Murtozoyev (7 goals)
- Biggest home win: Shurtan 7–1 Zaamin (30 September 2020)
- Biggest away win: Zaamin 2–4 Neftchi (23 October 2020)
- Highest scoring: Shurtan 7–1 Zaamin (30 September 2020)
- Longest winning run: Bukhara
- Longest losing run: Dustlik Tashkent
- Highest attendance: 5210 (Neftchi 0-1 Turon, 1 December 2020)
- Lowest attendance: 25 (Istiqlol 2-1 Oqtepa, 13 November 2020)

The 2020 Uzbekistan Pro League (Uzbek: Футбол бўйича 2020-йилги Ўзбекистон Про лигаси) is the 29th since its establishment in 1992. The competition started on 17 March 2020.

== Teams ==
Location of teams in 2020 Uzbekistan Pro League

Club	Coach	Location	Stadium	Capacity	Kit sponsor	Shirt sponsor
Dinamo	(Russia) Sergey Lushan	Samarkand	Dinamo Samarkand Stadium	13,800	Joma	Agromir Buildings
Istiqlol	(Uzbekistan) Sergey Lebedev	Fergana	Fargona Stadium	11,000	Adidas	Stroy Montaj Invest
Khorazm	(Uzbekistan) Maksud Karimov	Urgench	Xorazm Stadium	13,500	Macron	
Neftchi Fergana	(Uzbekistan) Abdusmad Durmanov	Fergana	Fargona Stadium; Istiklol Stadium	11,000; 22,000	Joma	FNQIZ
Oqtepa	(Uzbekistan) Yaroslav Krushelnitskiy	Tashkent	Stadion Oq-tepa	2,000	Nike	
Shurtan	(Uzbekistan) Asror Aliqulov	G‘uzor	G'uzor Stadium	7,000	Sport-Saller	Uzbekneftegaz
Turon	(Uzbekistan) Islom Ismoilov	Yaypan	Uzbekistan Stadium	4,500	Adidas	Turon Eco Cement
Zaamin	(Uzbekistan) Jakhongir Jiyamurodov	Zaamin	Zaamin Stadium	5,000	Kappa	

=== Managerial changes ===
Team	Outgoing manager	Manner of departure	Date of vacancy	Position in table	Replaced by	Date of appointment
Dinamo	(Turkmenistan) Täçmyrat Agamyradow	Sacked	4 June 2020	Pre Season	(Uzbekistan) Sergey Lushan	11 July 2020

=== Foreign Players ===
Club	Player 1	Player 2	Player 3	Player 4
Dinamo	(Russia) Timur Sharipov			
Istiqlol				
Khorazm				
Neftchi Fergana				
Oqtepa	(Nigeria) Ibrahim Tomiva	(Nigeria) Samuel Opeh		
Shurtan				
Turon	(Ukraine) Amal Shavketov			
Zaamin				

== League table ==
Pos	Team	Pld	W	D	L	GF	GA	GD	Pts	Promotion, qualification or relegation
1	Turon Yaypan (P)	20	11	5	4	31	19	+12	38	Promotion to Uzbekistan Super League
2	Neftchi Fergana (A)	20	11	4	5	27	17	+10	37	Qualification to promotion play-offs
3	Dinamo Samarqand	20	9	5	6	25	19	+6	32	
4	Sho'rtan Gʻuzor	20	8	4	8	29	23	+6	28	
5	Istiqlol Fergana	20	9	2	9	21	24	−3	29	
6	Oq-Tepa Tashkent	20	6	4	10	23	31	−8	22	
7	Хorazm Urganch	20	6	3	11	23	32	−9	21	
8	FK Zomin (R)	20	6	1	13	31	45	−14	19	Relegation to Uzbekistan First League

Updated to match(es) played on 30 August 2020. Source: PFL.uz
Rules for classification: 1) Points; 2) Head-to-head points; 3) Head-to-head goal difference; 4) Head-to-head goals scored; 5) Goal difference; 6) Goals scored; .
(A) Advance to a further round; (P) Promoted; (R) Relegated

== Results ==
Home \ Away	DIN	IST	KHO	NEF	OQT	SHU	TUR	ZAM
Dinamo	—	1–2	3–1	0–1	2–0	0–0	1–0	3–0
Istiqlol Fergana	1–2	—	1–0	0–1	1–2	1–0	0–0	3–0
Khorazm	1–0	0–1	—	0–0	6–1	1–0	1–3	1–3
Neftchi	1–0	2–0	3–0	—	2–1	1–2	1–1	3–2
Oqtepa	1–1	1–2	3–1	1–1	—	0–1	2–3	4–0
Shurtan	2–2	2–0	4–1	2–1	0–1	—	3–2	7–1
Turon	1–1	2–1	3–0	1–1	1–0	0–1	—	3–2
Zaamin	1–2	0–1	2–2	2–4	3–1	3–1	1–2	—

Updated to match(es) played on 30-October 2020. Source: UZPFL
Legend: Blue = home team win; Yellow = draw; Red = away team win.

== Goals ==
- First goal of the season: Jamshid Qabulov for Neftchi against Dinamo (3 July 2020)

=== Goalscorers ===
As of 5 December 2020

#	Player	Club	Goals
1	(Uzbekistan) Doston Toshmatov	Neftchi Fergana	12
2	(Uzbekistan) Eldor Karimov	Zomin	9
2	(Uzbekistan) Jasur Kholturaev	Shurtan Guzar	9
4	(Uzbekistan) Abdulazizkhon Abdurashidov	FC Turon	7
5	(Uzbekistan) Idris Bikmaykin	FC Oqtepa	6

== See also ==
- 2020 Uzbekistan Super League
- 2020 Uzbekistan First League
- 2020 Uzbekistan Cup
