= 2018 Uzbekistan Pro League =

Uzbekistan Pro League
- Season: 2018

The 2018 Uzbekistan Pro League is the 27th since its establishment. The competition started on 6 April 2018 with the match between Norin and Dinamo Samarqand.

== Teams ==
Location of teams in 2018 Uzbekistan Pro League

Club	Location	Stadium
Andijon	Andijan	Soghlom Avlod Stadium
Dinamo	Samarkand	Dinamo Samarkand Stadium
Istiqlol	Fergana	Markaziy Stadium
Khorazm	Urgench	Xorazm Stadium
Mash'al	Muborak	Bahrom Vafoev Stadium
Norin	Khakkulabad	
Orol	Nukus	
Shurtan	G‘uzor	G'uzor Stadium
Surkhon Termez	Termez	Alpamish stadium

=== League table ===
Pos	Team	Pld	W	D	L	GF	GA	GD	Pts	Promotion, qualification or relegation
1	Andijon	32	18	9	5	57	29	+28	63 (Note: Head-to-head results: Andijon 2–0 Mash'al, Mash'al 2–2 Andijon.)	Promotion to Uzbekistan Super League
2	Mash'al	32	19	6	7	53	27	+26	63	Qualification to promotion play-offs
3	Istiqlol	32	18	3	11	52	33	+19	57	Qualification to promotion play-offs
4	Surkhon	32	15	8	9	62	36	+26	53	
5	Dinamo	32	15	7	10	41	26	+15	52	
6	Shurtan	32	10	7	15	33	45	−12	34 (Note: Shurtan deducted 3 points.)	
7	Khorazm	32	9	6	17	51	70	−19	33	
8	Norin	32	3	12	17	24	59	−35	21	Relegation
9	Orol	32	4	8	20	30	78	−48	20	Relegation

Source: PFL.uz
Rules for classification: 1) Points; 2) Head-to-head points; 3) Head-to-head goal difference; 4) Head-to-head goals scored; 5) Goal difference; 6) Goals scored; .

== Promotion play-offs ==
26 November 2018

Mash'al	4–0	Sherdor
Khumoyun Murtozoyev 36' 90+3'; Abdulla Olimov 81' 88'	Report

Dustlik Stadium, Dustlik
Attendance: 104
Referee: Shavkat Nasibullaev

27 November 2018

Istiqlol	2–1	Nurafshon
Abdukholiq Kurbanov 8' (pen.); Hamidullo Abduhamidov 59'	Report	Farrukh Shotursunov 66'

AGMK Stadium, Olmaliq
Attendance: 520
Referee: Akobir Shukrullaev

Mash'al and Istiqlol qualified for 2018 Uzbekistan Super League relegation play-off

== See also ==
- 2018 Uzbekistan Super League
- 2018 Uzbekistan Pro-B League
