= 2020 Uzbekistan Cup =

2020 O'zbekiston Kubogi
Tournament details
- Country: Uzbekistan

Final positions
- Champions: Pakhtakor (13th title)
- Runners-up: AGMK

Tournament statistics
- Matches played: 14
- Goals scored: 51 (3.64 per match)

The 2020 Uzbekistan Cup was the 28th season of the annual Uzbekistan Cup, the knockout football cup competition of Uzbekistan.

The cup winner is guaranteed a place in the 2021 AFC Champions League.

== First qualifying round ==
The draw for the first qualifying round was held on 13 June 2020. The eight teams which play in the 2020 Uzbekistan Pro League enter this round.

23 June 2020	Neftchi Fergana	3–2	Khorazm Urganch	Fergana
17:30 UTC+05:00	Zokirov 65', 74'; Bobozhonov 89'	Report	Khamdamov 9' (pen.); Sheripov 53'	Stadium: Stadion Neftchi

23 June 2020	Oqtepa	2–0	Zaamin	Tashkent
17:30 UTC+05:00	Tomiwa 76'; Sodiqov 80'	Report		Stadium: Stadion Oq-tepa

23 June 2020	Istiqlol Fergana	0–3	Dinamo Samarqand	Fergana
17:30 UTC+05:00		Report	Norov 32'; Rahimberganov 52'; Temirov 73'	Stadium: Fargona Stadium

23 June 2020	Turon	1–1 (3–5 p)	Shurtan Guzar	Yaypan
17:30 UTC+05:00	Khusbakov 75' (pen.)	Report	Xoltoraev 64'	Stadium: Uzbekistan Stadium

== Second qualifying round ==
The draw for the second qualifying round was held on 23 June 2020. The four teams which advance from the first qualifying round play in this round.

28 June 2020	Dinamo Samarqand (2)	3–4	Oqtepa (2)	Dinamo Samarkand Stadium, Samarkand
18:00	Shabirov 75'; Allamkhonov 80'; Abdurakhmanov 90+1'	Report	Tomiwa 23', 37', 63'; Ochilov 78'	Attendance: 0 Referee: Rustam Lutfullin

28 June 2020	Shurtan Guzar (2)	2–1	Neftchi Fergana (2)	G'uzor Stadium, G'uzor
18:00	Zokirov 31' (pen.); Thiaguinho 71'	Report	Khonturaev 60'	Attendance: 0 Referee: Ilya Ilin

== Round of 16 ==
The draw for the round of 16 was held on 14 November 2020. The two teams which advance from the second qualifying round joined by fourteen teams from 2020 Uzbekistan Super League.

7 December 2020	Andijon (1)	0–1	Nasaf (1)	Andijan
		Report

7 December 2020	Oqtepa (2)	0–2	Navbahor (1)	Tashkent
		Report

7 December 2020	Bukhoro (1)	0–2	Metallurg (1)	Olmaliq
		Report

7 December 2020	Qizilqum (1)	3–1	Bunyodkor (1)	Navoiy
		Report

8 December 2020	Kokand 1912 (1)	4–0	Surkhon Termez (1)	Kokand
		Report

8 December 2020	Mashal (1)	3–1	Shurtan Guzar (2)	Muborak
		Report

8 December 2020	Lokomotiv (1)	0–3	AGMK (1)	Tashkent
		Report

8 December 2020	Pakhtakor (1)	8–1	Sogdiana (1)	Tashkent
		Report

== Quarter-finals ==
The draw for the quarter-finals was held on 8 December 2020. The eight teams which advance from the round of 16 play in this round.

12 December 2020	Mashal (1)	0–1	Kokand 1912 (1)
		Report

12 December 2020	Navbahor (1)	1–2 (a.e.t.)	Nasaf (1)
		Report

12 December 2020	Pakhtakor (1)	1–0	Qizilqum (1)
		Report

12 December 2020	AGMK (1)	4–3 (a.e.t.)	Metallurg (1)
		Report

== Semi-finals ==
The draw for the semi-finals was held on 12 December 2020. The four teams which advance from the quarter-finals play in this round.

16 December 2020	AGMK (1)	1–0	Nasaf (1)

16 December 2020	Kokand 1912 (1)	0–3	Pakhtakor (1)

== Final ==
20 December 2020	Pakhtakor	3–0	AGMK
