= 2015 Uzbekistan Cup =

O'zbekiston Kubogi 2015
Tournament details
- Country: Uzbekistan
- Teams: 38

Final positions
- Champions: Nasaf Qarshi
- Runners-up: Bunyodkor

The 2015 Uzbekistan Cup was the 23rd season of the annual Uzbek football Cup competition. The Cup draw was held on 12 February 2014 in Tashkent. Final match was played on 17 November 2015.

The competition started on 1 April 2015, and will end in November 2015 with the final to be held at the Pakhtakor Markaziy Stadium in Tashkent. Lokomotiv Tashkent, the defending Cup winner and 2014 Cup semifinalists, Pakhtakor, Bunyodkor, Nasaf Qarshi start in 1/8 final stage of the Cup.

The cup winner is guaranteed a place in the 2016 AFC Champions League.

== Calendar ==
Round	Date	Fixtures	Clubs	Notes
First round	April 1, 2015	8	36→ 28	Clubs participating in First League gain entry.
Round of 32	April 28–29, 2015	12	28 → 16	Clubs participating in Uzbek League gain entry.
Round of 16	May, 2015	8	16→ 8	
Quarterfinals	July 4, 7, 8–9, 28, 2015	4	8 → 4	
Semifinals	August 12; September 15–16, 2015	2	4 → 2	
Final	November 17, 2015	1	2 → 1	

== First round ==
First round matches were played on 1 April 2015 to define teams of Round of 32.

Home team	Score	Away team
Alanga Koson	3 - 2	Nasaf-2
FK Gijduvan	0 - 1	Mashʼal-2
Bunyodkor-2	2 - 1	Chust-Pakhtakor
Pakhtakor-2	1 - 0	Lokomotiv BFK
Hotira-79	2 - 1	FK Yozyovon
FK Zaamin	1 - 2	Sherdor
FK Kosonsoy	1 - 2	Sementchi Kuvasoy
Xorazm FK Urganch	0 - 3	FK Orol Nukus

== Bracket ==
Round of 32; April 28–29, 2015
Alanga	0
Navbahor Namangan	3
FK Andijan	1
Mashʼal-2	0
Bunyodkor-2	3
Metallurg Bekabad	5
Pakhtakor-2	2
FK Dinamo Samarqand	0
NBU Osiyo	1
FK Buxoro	4
Oqtepa	4
Neftchi Farg'ona	1
Qizilqum Zarafshon	2
Obod Tashkent	5
Sogdiana Jizzakh	3
Uz-Dong-Ju	2
Hotira-79	1
Kokand 1912	2
Mash'al Mubarek	2
Sherdor	0
Olmaliq FK	2
Sementchi Kuvasoy	3
Shurtan Guzar	1
Orol Nukus	0

Round of 16; May, 2015
Lokomotiv Tashkent	2	3	5
Navbahor Namangan	0	1	1
FK Andijan	3	0	3
Metallurg Bekabad	1	4	5
Pakhtakor-2	0	4	4
FK Buxoro	3	1	4
Oqtepa	1	1	2
Nasaf Qarshi	2	3	5
Bunyodkor	1	1	2
Obod Tashkent	0	1	1
Sogdiana Jizzakh	1	2	3
Kokand 1912	0	1	1
Mash'al Mubarek	2	0	2
Sementchi Kuvasoy	1	1	2
Shurtan Guzar	2	0	2
Pakhtakor	1	2	3

Quarterfinals; July 4,7, 8-9, 28, 2015
Lokomotiv Tashkent	1	1	2
Metallurg Bekabad	0	0	0
Pakhtakor-2	0	0	0
Nasaf Qarshi	6	2	8
Bunyodkor	2	2	4
Sogdiana Jizzakh	1	0	1
Sementchi Kuvasoy	2	0	2
Pakhtakor	2	2	4

Semifinals; August 12, September 15–16, 2015
Lokomotiv Tashkent	0	1	1
Nasaf Qarshi	2	0	2
Bunyodkor	3	1	4
Pakhtakor	2	0	2

Final; November 17, 2015
Nasaf Qarshi	2
Bunyodkor	1

== Round of 32 ==
The one leg matches will be played on April 28–29, 2015.

Team 1	Score	Team 2
Alanga	0-3	Navbahor Namangan
Mash'al-2	0-1	FK Andijan
Bunyodkor-2	3-5	Metallurg Bekabad
Pakhtakor-2	2-0	FK Dinamo Samarqand
NBU Osiyo	1-4	FK Buxoro
Oqtepa	4-1	Neftchi Farg'ona
Obod	5-2	Qizilqum Zarafshon
UzDongJu	2-3	Sogdiana Jizzakh
Hotira-79	1-2	Kokand 1912
Sherdor	0-2	Mash'al Mubarek
'Sementchi Kuvasoy	3-2	Olmaliq FK
FK Orol Nukus	0-1	Shurtan Guzar

== Round of 16 ==
The sixteen winners from the Round of 32 were drawn into eight two-legged ties.

Team 1	Agg.	Team 2	1st leg	2nd leg
Pakhtakor-2	4−4	FK Buxoro	0−3	4−1
Mash'al Mubarek	2−2	Sementchi	2−1	0−1
FK Andijan	3−5	Metallurg Bekabad	3−1	0−4
Oqtepa	2−5	Nasaf Qarshi	1−2	1−3
Lokomotiv Tashkent	5−1	Navbahor Namangan	2−0	3−1
Bunyodkor	2−1	Obod	1−0	1−1
Shurtan Guzar	2−3	Pakhtakor	2−1	0−2
Sogdiana Jizzakh	3−1	Kokand 1912	1−0	2−1

== Quarterfinals ==
The first leg matches were played on 4 July (Metallurg Bekabad - Lokomotiv Tashkent, Pakhtakor-2 - Nasaf), 8 July (Pakhtakor - Semetchi Kuvasoy) and on 9 July (Sogdiana Jizzakh- Bunyodkor) The second legs matches were played on 7 July (Lokomotiv - Metallurg Bekabad and Nasaf - Pakhtakor-2). The second legs matches Pakhtakor - Semetchi Kuvasoy and Bunyodkor - Sogdiana Jizzakh will be played on 28 July 2015.

Team 1	Agg.	Team 2	1st leg	2nd leg
Pakhtakor-2	0−8	Nasaf Qarshi	0−6	0−2
Metallurg Bekabad	0−2	Lokomotiv Tashkent	0−1	0−1
Sementchi	2−4	Pakhtakor	2−2	0−2
Sogdiana Jizzakh	1−4	Bunyodkor	1−2	0−2

== Semifinals ==
The first leg matches to be played on 11–12 August 2015. The second leg matches on 15–16 September 2015.

Team 1	Agg.	Team 2	1st leg	2nd leg
Nasaf Qarshi	2-1	Lokomotiv Tashkent	2-0	0-1
Pakhtakor	2-4	Bunyodkor	2-3	0-1

== Final ==
Team 1	Score	Team 2
Nasaf Qarshi	2−1	Bunyodkor
