= 2016 Uzbekistan First League =

Football season in Uzbekistan

Uzbekistan First League
- Season: 2016
- Teams: 18
- Champions: Dinamo Samarqand
- Relegated: Pakhtakor-2
- Matches: 272
- Goals: 1,046 (3.85 per match)
- Top goalscorer: Navruz Khaipov (30 goals)
- Biggest home win: Sementchi 5-0 Quvasoy (12 November 2016)
- Biggest away win: NBU Osiyo 8-1 Gijduvan (6 June 2016)

The 2016 Uzbekistan First League was the 25th season of second level football in Uzbekistan since independence in 1992. In comparison to 2015 season in 2016 all clubs played two leg matches against each other without geographical split as years before.

== Teams and locations ==
Location of the 2016 First League teams

Team	Location	Stadium	Stadium capacity
Dinamo	Samarkand	Dinamo Stadium	16,000
Gijduvan	Gijduvan	Gijduvan Stadium	
Khotira-79	Uychi	Uychi Stadium	
Kosonsoy	Kosonsoy	Kosonsoy Stadium	30,000
Lokomotiv BFK	Tashkent		
Mash'al-2	Muborak	Bahrom Vafoev Stadium	10,000
Nasaf-2	Qarshi		
NBU Osiyo	Tashkent	NBU Stadium	9,100
Norin	Khakkulabad	Khakkulabad Stadium	
Nuravshon	Bukhoro	Nuravshon Stadium	
Oqtepa	Tashkent	Oq-Tepa Stadium	2,000
Orol Nukus	Nukus	Turon Stadium	9,300
Sementchi	Kuvasoy	Kuvasoy Stadium	
Pakhtakor-2	Tashkent	Pakhtakor Stadium	33,000
Uz-Dong-Ju	Andijan	Soghlom Avlod Stadium	18,360
Xorazm	Urganch	Xorazm Stadium	12,000
Yozyovon Lochinlari	Yozyovon	Yozyovon Stadium	
Zaamin	Jizzakh Province	Zaamin Stadium	4,000

=== League table ===
Final standings The last matchday matches were played on 12 November 2016

Pos	Team	Pld	W	D	L	GF	GA	GF	Pts.	Qualification or relegation
1	Dinamo	32	26	4	2	86	19	+67	82	Promotion to Uzbek League
2	Norin	32	24	3	5	63	29	+34	75	Qualification to Promotion play-offs
3	Sementchi Kuvasoy	32	23	5	4	69	19	+50	74	.
4	Uz-Dong-Ju	32	17	4	11	67	58	+9	55	.
5	NBU Osiyo	32	15	6	11	63	46	+17	51	.
6	Nasaf-2	32	15	1	16	61	62	-1	46	.
7	Xorazm	32	12	6	14	56	50	+6	42	.
8	Nurafshon	32	13	2	17	56	61	-5	41	.
9	Mash'al-2	32	11	8	13	46	59	-13	41	.
10	Orol Nukus	32	12	2	18	71	88	-17	38	.
11	Yozyovon Lochinlari	32	11	5	16	58	76	-18	38	.
12	Zaamin	32	10	6	16	44	59	-15	36	.
13	Lokomotiv BFK	32	10	5	17	55	66	-11	35	.
14	Khotira-79	32	10	3	19	51	78	-27	33	.
15	Gijduvon	32	9	5	18	51	93	-42	32	Qualification to the Relegation play-offs
16	Kosonsoy	32	9	4	19	42	63	-21	31	.
17	Pakhtakor-2	32	7	7	18	49	62	-13	28	Relegation to 2.League
18	Oqtepa	0	0	0	0	0	0	0	0	Disqualified

Last updated: 12 November 2016
Source: Soccerway

=== Top goalscorers ===
#	Scorer	Team	Goals (Pen.)
1	(Uzbekistan) Navruz Khaipov	Orol Nukus	30
2	(Uzbekistan) A.Safarov	Dinamo	22
