= 2005 Uzbekistan Cup =

Tournament details
- Country: Uzbekistan
- Dates: March – October 2006
- Teams: 34

Final positions
- Champions: Pakhtakor (7th title)
- Runners-up: Neftchi
- Third place: Navbahor
- Fourth place: Bukhara

Tournament statistics
- Matches played: 60
- Goals scored: 211 (3.52 per match)

The 2005 Uzbekistan Cup (in Uzbek: Футбол бўйича 2005-йилги Ўзбекистон Кубоги) was a football tournament organized by Uzbekistan Football Federation, in which 34 clubs participated. Starting from the first round, the tournament was held in a knockout system. The final match took place on 26 November 2005 at the Pakhtakor Central Stadium in Tashkent between Neftchi and Pakhtakor. Pakhtakor won the cup for the seventh time.

== Preliminary round ==
=== 1st group ===
No.	Clubs	G	W	D	L	GF	GA	P	Notes
1	Neftchi	2	2	0	0	6	1	6	Qualifying for 1/16
2	AOZSK	2	1	0	1	3	5	3	
3	Shakhrikhan	2	0	0	2	1	4	0	

=== 2nd group ===
No.	Clubs	G	W	D	L	GF	GA	P	Notes
1	Navbahor	2	2	0	0	4	1	6	Qualifying for 1/16
2	Sementchi	2	1	0	1	3	2	3	
3	Uz-Dong-Ju	2	0	0	2	0	4	0	

=== 3rd group ===
No.	Clubs	G	W	D	L	GF	GA	P	Notes
1	Andijon	2	2	0	0	5	1	6	Qualifying for 1/16
2	Kokand 1912	2	0	0	2	1	5	0	

=== 4th group ===
No.	Clubs	G	W	D	L	GF	GA	P	Notes
1	Lokomotiv	2	2	0	0	10	1	6	Qualifying for 1/16
2	Kimyogar	2	0	0	2	1	10	0	

=== 5th group ===
No.	Clubs	G	W	D	L	GF	GA	P	Notes
1	Traktor	2	2	0	0	7	2	6	Qualifying for 1/16
2	Gʻallakor	2	1	0	1	5	5	3	
3	Sirdaryo	2	0	0	2	1	6	0	

=== 6th group ===
No.	Clubs	G	W	D	L	GF	GA	P	Notes
1	NBU-Asia	2	2	0	0	3	0	6	Qualifying for 1/16
2	Metallurg	2	0	0	2	0	3	0	

=== 7th group ===
No.	Clubs	G	W	D	L	GF	GA	P	Notes
1	Sogdiana	2	2	0	0	4	0	6	Qualifying for 1/16
2	Shaykhontokhur	2	1	0	1	2	3	3	
3	AGMK	2	0	0	2	1	4	0	

=== 8th group ===
No.	Clubs	G	W	D	L	GF	GA	P	Notes
1	Bukhara	2	2	0	0	8	5	6	Qualifying for 1/16
2	Khazorasp	2	0	0	2	5	8	0	

=== 9th group ===
No.	Clubs	G	W	D	L	GF	GA	P	Notes
1	Qizilqum	2	1	1	0	3	0	4	Qualifying for 1/16
2	Xorazm-2003	2	0	1	1	0	3	1	

=== 10th group ===
No.	Clubs	G	W	D	L	GF	GA	P	Notes
1	Surkhon	2	1	0	1	4	3	3	Qualifying for 1/16
2	Toʻpalang	2	1	0	1	3	3	3	
3	Denov	2	1	0	1	3	4	3	

=== 11th group ===
No.	Clubs	G	W	D	L	GF	GA	P	Notes
1	Nasaf	2	2	0	0	6	3	6	Qualifying for 1/16
2	Vobkent	2	0	0	2	3	6	0	

=== 12nd group ===
No.	Clubs	G	W	D	L	GF	GA	P	Notes
1	Mashal (Muborak)	2	2	0	0	17	2	6	Qualifying for 1/16
2	Nasaf-2	2	0	0	2	2	17	0	

=== 13th group ===
No.	Clubs	G	W	D	L	GF	GA	P	Notes
1	Dinamo	2	2	0	0	5	0	6	Qualifying for 1/16
2	Zarafshon	2	0	0	2	0	5	0	

=== 14th group ===
No.	Clubs	G	W	D	L	GF	GA	P	Notes
1	Shurtan	1	1	0	0	9	0	3	Qualifying for 1/16
2	Neftchi	1	0	0	1	0	9	0	

== Round of 16 ==
Teams	1st match	2nd match
Teams	26 May	4 June
NBU-Asia — Neftchi	0:2	0:4
	27 May	
Lokomotiv — Surkhon	3:0	1:2
Mashal — Andijon	4:0	0:0
	28 May	
Samarqand-Dinamo — Traktor	2:1	1:3
Sogdiana — Navbahor	2:1	1:3
Nasaf — Qizilqum	3:1	2:3
Shurtan — Buxoro	1:3	0:2
Pakhtakor (Toshkent) was released from the round of 16

== Quarter-finals ==
Teams	1	2
Teams	4 September	12 September
Bukhara — Traktor (Tashkent)	5:0	0:1
Navbahor — Lokomotiv	3:0	1:0
		20 September
Mash’al — Neftchi	1:5	0:3
	11 November	14 November
Nasaf — Pakhtakor	1:4	0:0

== Semi-finals ==
Teams	1	2
Teams	19 October	16 November
Bukhara — Neftchi	1:0	0:3
	18 November	21 November
Navbahor - Pakhtakor	4:4	1:3
