= Husniddin Aliqulov =

Uzbekistani footballer (born 1999)

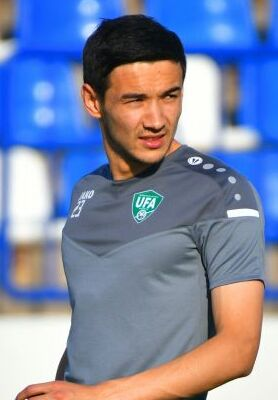
- Aliqulov in 2023

Personal information
- Date of birth: 4 April 1999 (age 27)
- Place of birth: Kitab, Uzbekistan
- Height: 1.86 m (6 ft 1 in)
- Position: Centre-back

Team information
- Current team: Çaykur Rizespor
- Number: 2

Youth career
- Nasaf
- 2017–2018: Mash'al–2

Senior career*
Years	Team	Apps	(Gls)
2018	Mash'al	12	(1)
2019–2023	Nasaf	88	(10)
2023–	Çaykur Rizespor	61	(3)

International career^{‡}
2019–2020	Uzbekistan U23	9	(0)
2024	Uzbekistan Olympic (O.P.)	3	(0)
2020–	Uzbekistan	30	(3)
Medal record
Representing Uzbekistan
CAFA Nations Cup
Winner	2025	Team
- * Club domestic league appearances and goals as of 25 May 2025 ‡ National team caps and goals as of 10 June 2025

Husniddin Aliqulov (Uzbek Cyrillic: Ҳусниддин Алиқулов; born 4 April 1999) is an Uzbek professional footballer who plays as a centre-back for Süper Lig club Çaykur Rizespor and the Uzbekistan national team.

== Club career ==
On 5 August 2023, he signed a 3+1 contract with the Çaykur Rizespor team of the Süper Lig. The Turkish team bought Aliqulov from Karshi's Nasaf team for 400,000 € and Husniddin sent a farewell letter to Karshi's team on Instagram.

== International career ==
Aliqulov made his debut for the Uzbekistan main team on 3 September 2020 in a Friendly match against Tajikistan.

2023 Asian Cup was included in the final lineup. But on 7 January 2024, it became known that he could not participate due to the injury he received in the match against the Palestine national team.

== Career statistics ==
=== Club ===
As of match played 25 May 2025

Club	Season	League			National Cup		Continental		Other		Total	
Club	Season	Division	Apps	Goals	Apps	Goals	Apps	Goals	Apps	Goals	Apps	Goals
Mash'al Mubarek	2018	Uzbekistan Pro League	12	1	1	0	–		1	0 (Note: Appearance(s) in Uzbekistan League Cup)	14	0
Nasaf	2019	Uzbekistan Super League	9	0	3	0	–		1	0	13	0
Nasaf	2020	Uzbekistan Super League	23	0	3	0	–		–		26	0
Nasaf	2021	Uzbekistan Super League	20	3	4	1	6	2 (Note: Appearance(s) in AFC Cup)	1	0 (Note: Appearance(s) in Uzbekistan Super Cup)	31	6
Nasaf	2022	Uzbekistan Super League	24	2	4	2	8	0 (Note: Appearance(s) in Asian Champions League)	1	0	37	4
Nasaf	2023	Uzbekistan Super League	12	5	2	0	–		–		14	5
Çaykur Rizespor	2023–24	Süper Lig	21	0	1	0	–		–		22	0
Çaykur Rizespor	2024–25	Süper Lig	33	3	2	0	–		–		35	3
Career total			154	14	20	3	14	2	4	0	192	19

=== International ===
National team	Year	Apps	Goals
Uzbekistan	2020	1	0
Uzbekistan	2021	3	0
Uzbekistan	2022	6	0
Uzbekistan	2023	8	1
Uzbekistan	2024	10	2
Uzbekistan	2025	0	0
Total		28	3

Statistics accurate as of match played 19 November 2024

List of international goals scored by Husniddin Aliqulov
No.	Date	Venue	Cap	Opponent	Score	Result	Competition
1	13 October 2023	Dalian Pro Academy Base Stadium, Dalian, China	15	Vietnam	2–0	2–0	Friendly
2	6 June 2024	Milliy Stadium, Tashkent, Uzbekistan	21	Turkmenistan	1–0	3–1	2026 FIFA World Cup qualification
3	10 September 2024	Dolen Omurzakov Stadium, Bishkek, Kyrgyzstan	24	Kyrgyzstan	2–2	3–2	2026 FIFA World Cup qualification

== Honours ==
Nasaf

- Uzbekistan Cup: 2022
- AFC Cup runner-up: 2021

Mash'al Mubarek

- Pro League: 2018
