= Pavel Purishkin =

Uzbek football player of Russian descent (born 1988)

Personal information
- Date of birth: 18 July 1988 (age 38)
- Place of birth: Nukus, Uzbek SSR, Soviet Union
- Height: 1.87 m (6 ft 1 1/2 in)
- Position: Striker

Youth career
- 2006–2007: Pakhtakor Tashkent

Senior career*
Years	Team	Apps	(Gls)
2007	Shurtan Guzar	13	(1)
2008–2009	Dinamo Samarqand	2	(0)
2010	Sogdiana Jizzakh	23	(9)
2011–2012	Ak Bulak	48	(20)
2013	Spartak Semey	30	(14)
2014	Astana-1964	15	(10)
2015	CSKA Almaty	6	(2)
2016	UiTM FC	7	(8)
2017	Caspiy	10	(2)
2017	PSM Makassar	13	(4)
2018	Metallurg Bekabad	8	(1)
2018	Dinamo Samarqand	16	(5)
2019	Oqtepa	21	(19)
2020	Oman Club		

International career
2004	Uzbekistan U17		
- * Club domestic league appearances and goals

Pavel Purishkin (Uzbek: Павел Пурышкин; born 18 July 1988) is an Uzbek football player of Russian descent.

== Career ==
=== Youth career ===
Pavel Purishkin is a graduate of the Uzbek top club Pakhtakor Tashkent's academy. Top goalscorer of Uzbek Reserves League in 2007 and part of Uzbekistan national under-17 football team at 2004 AFC U-17 Championship held in Japan.

=== Club career ===
Purishkin began his career in 2007 with Shurtan Guzar in Uzbek League.

In 2011 Pavel moved to Kazakhstan First Division where he scored 44 goals in 99 games for Ak Bulak, Spartak Semey, Astana-1964 and CSKA Almaty. In 2013 his goal in promotion playoff helped Spartak Semey achieve a 1–0 win over FC Vostok and win promotion to 2014 Kazakhstan Premier League.

In February 2016, Purishkin signed a one-year contract with Malaysian UiTM FC. In his first official game for the club, Purishkin scored a hat-trick and made an assist in a 4–1 win vs. Sabah FA on 12 February 2016. Purishkin scored his 4th goal in the first 2 games for the new club in a 1–0 away win vs. Perlis FA on 15 February 2016.

After playing in Kazakhstan and Indonesia in 2017 Purishkin continued playing for clubs in Uzbekistan in 2018 and 2019 seasons. In August 2019 Pavel scored a hat-trick in Uzbekistan Cup match against Uzbekistan top division side AGMK after coming in as a substitute in the second half of the game.

== Name ==
Purishkin's last name (Пурышкин in Russian) has multiple ways of being transliterated from its original spelling in the Russian Cyrillic alphabet into the Latin alphabet. Purishkin is the spelling used throughout the player's passport and other official documents. It has also been adopted by FIFA and is the preferred spelling in most English publications (although Puryshkin is also used elsewhere).

== Statistics ==
=== Club career statistics ===
As of 20 November 2019

Club	Season	Division	League		Cup		Continental		Total	
Club	Season	Division	Apps	Goals	Apps	Goals	Apps	Goals	Apps	Goals
Uzbekistan			League		Uzbekistan Cup		AFC		Total	
Shurtan Guzar	2007	Uzbek League	13	1	?	1	-	-	14	2
Dinamo Samarqand	2008	Uzbek League	1	0	?	?	-	-	1	0
Dinamo Samarqand	2009	Uzbek League	1	0	?	0	-	-	2	0
Sogdiana Jizzakh	2010	Uzbekistan First League	23	9	?	?	-	-	23	9
Kazakhstan			League		Kazakhstan Cup		UEFA		Total	
Ak Bulak	2011	Kazakhstan First Division	20	5	1	0	-	-	21	5
Ak Bulak	2012	Kazakhstan First Division	28	15	3	1	-	-	31	16
Spartak Semey	2013	Kazakhstan First Division	30	14	0	0	-	-	30	14
Astana-1964	2014	Kazakhstan First Division	15	10	-	-	-	-	15	10
CSKA Almaty	2015	Kazakhstan First Division	6	0	-	-	-	-	6	0
Malaysia			League		Malaysia FA Cup		AFC		Total	
UiTM FC	2016	Malaysia Premier League	7	8	1	0	-	-	8	8
Kazakhstan			League		Kazakhstan Cup		UEFA		Total	
Caspiy	2017	Kazakhstan First Division	10	2	1	0	-	-	11	2
Indonesia			League		Cup		AFC		Total	
Makassar	2017	Liga 1	13	4	-	-	-	-	13	4
Uzbekistan			League		Uzbekistan Cup		AFC		Total	
Metallurg Bekabad	2018	Uzbek League	8	1	-	-	-	-	8	1
Dinamo Samarqand	2018	Uzbekistan Pro League	16	5	-	-	-	-	16	5
Oqtepa	2019	Uzbekistan Pro League	21	19	2	4	-	-	23	23
Total	Uzbekistan		83	35	4	5	-	-	87	40
Total	Kazakhstan		109	46	5	1	-	-	114	47
Total	Malaysia		7	8	1	0	-	-	8	8
Total	Indonesia		13	4	-	-	-	-	13	4
Career Total			212	93	10	6	-	-	222	99

== Honours ==
Club

- Kazakhstan First Division runner-up: 2013
- Uzbekistan First League runner-up: 2010
- Kazakhstan First Division third place: 2014
