= Anvar Khojimirzaev =

Uzbek footballer

Anvar Khojimirzayev
Personal information
- Full name: Anvar Muhammadjon o'g'li Hojimirzayev
- Date of birth: October 21, 1994 (age 32)
- Place of birth: Kosonsoy, Uzbekistan
- Height: 1.78 m (5 ft 10 in)
- Position: Midfielder

Team information
- Current team: Dinamo Samarqand
- Number: 10

Senior career*
Years	Team	Apps	(Gls)
2017–2019	Istiqlol Fergana	-	(19+)
2020	Navbahor Namangan	0	(0)
2020	Neftchi Fergana	14	(0)
2021–2023	Kokand 1912	47	(19)
2024–	Dinamo Samarqand	64	(26)

International career
2025	Uzbekistan		
- * Club domestic league appearances and goals as of 28 July 2026

Anvar Khojimirzayev (Uzbek: Anvar Muhammadjon o'g'li Hojimirzayev; born 21 October 1994, Kosonsoy, Namangan Region) is an Uzbek professional footballer who plays as a midfielder for Dinamo Samarqand. He currently plays as team's captain.

== Playing career ==
Anvar Khojimirzayev began his professional football career at Namangan football school. Ahead of the 2020 season, he joined Namangan's Navbahor. Before the second half of the 2020 season, he signed a contract with Neftchi.

For the 2021 season, he transferred from Neftchi to Kokand 1912. Became the top scorer of 2023 Uzbekistan Pro League with 16 goals while playing for Kokand 1912.

In January 2024, he signed a contract with Dinamo Samarqand.

In the 2024 Uzbekistan Super League season, Khojimirzayev delivered an impressive performance for Dinamo. Played 27 matches in the Super League and the Uzbekistan Cup, scoring 10 goals - the same tally as his teammate, a member of Kyrgyzstan national football team Joel Kojo - and became the club's top scorer. He was included in the shortlist for 2024 Uzbekistan Best Player.

At the end of the 2024 Super League season, he won the "Discovery of the Year" award from Uzbekistan Professional Football League and was named to Uzbekistan Super League Team of the Year. After the season, he extended his contract with Dinamo until the end of 2025.

== Honours ==
- Uzbekistan Pro League runner-up: (2): 2019, 2020
- Uzbekistan Pro League Top Scorer (1): 2023
