= Nematullo Quttiboev =

Uzbekistani footballer

Personal information
- Date of birth: 28 September 1973 (age 53)
- Place of birth: Uzbek SSR
- Height: 1.75 m (5 ft 9 in)
- Position: Forward

Senior career*
Years	Team	Apps	(Gls)
1990–1993	Orol Nukus	119	(31)
1994–1995	Neftchi Fergana	40	(9)
1996–1997	Xorazm Urganch		
1998–1999	Neftchi Fergana	19	(7)
2000	Jayhun Nukus	12	(6)
2000	Semurg Angren	20	(12)
2001–2002	Pakhtakor Tashkent	55	(25)
2003	Ordabasy	9	(2)
2005–2006	Qizilqum Zarafshon	37	(16)
2006	Xorazm Urganch	11	(3)
2007	Qizilqum Zarafshon	11	(8)

International career
1998–2002	Uzbekistan	15	(5)

Managerial career
- 2013–2016: Orol Nukus
- * Club domestic league appearances and goals

Nematullo Quttiboev (Uzbek: Неъматулла Қутибоев, Russian: Неъматулла Кутыбаев; born 28 September 1973) is an Uzbek professional football and coach and former player who played for FC Pakhtakor Tashkent in the Uzbek League and FC Ordabasy the Kazakhstan Premier League.

== Playing career ==
He started his playing career in 1991 at Aral Nukus. He is one of the most scoring forwards of Uzbek League with 106 goals and also member of Gennadi Krasnitsky club with 131 goals.

== International ==
He made his official debut for Uzbekistan national team on 16 November 1998 in a friendly match against India in Delhi. He played for Uzbekistan in the 2000 Asian Cup. Kutibayev completed 15 caps for national team, scoring 5 goals.

== Managing career ==
In 2013, he started his managing career at FK Orol Nukus, club playing in Uzbekistan First League. He resigned head coach post at Orol Nukus in March 2016.

== Honours ==
=== Club ===
Neftchi

- Uzbek League (1): 1995
- Uzbek League runners-up (2): 1998, 1999
- Uzbek Cup runners-up (1): 1998

Pakhtakor

- Uzbek League (1): 2002
- Uzbek League runners-up (1): 2001
- Uzbek Cup (2): 2001, 2002

=== Individual ===
- Gennadi Krasnitsky club: 131 goals

== Career statistics ==
=== International goals ===
Scores and results list. Uzbekistan's goal tally first.

#	Date	Venue	Opponent	Score	Result	Competition
1.	19 November 1998	Salt Lake Stadium, Salt Lake City, India	India	4–0	4–0	Friendly
2.	5 December 1998	700th Anniversary Stadium, Chiang Mai, Thailand	Mongolia	8–0	15–0	1998 Asian Games
3.	5 December 1998	700th Anniversary Stadium, Chiang Mai, Thailand	Mongolia	9–0	15–0	1998 Asian Games
4.	5 December 1998	700th Anniversary Stadium, Chiang Mai, Thailand	Mongolia	12–0	15–0	1998 Asian Games
5.	5 December 1998	Rajamangala Stadium, Bangkok, Thailand	Turkmenistan	1–0	1–1	1998 Asian Games
