= 2018 Uzbekistan Pro-B League =

- Season: 2018
- Champions: Nurafshon
- Promoted: Nurafshon; FC Sherdor
- Relegated: Khotira-79; Lokomotiv-BFK

The 2018 Uzbekistan Pro-B League is the 1st since its establishment. The competition started on 12 March 2018.

== Teams ==
Location of teams in 2018 Uzbekistan Pro League

Club	Location	Stadium
G'ijduvon	G‘ijduvon	
Iftikhor	Oltiariq	
Khotira-79	Uychi	
Labsa	Bukhara	
Lokomotiv-BFK	Tashkent	
Nurafshon	Tashkent	
Sherdor	Samarkand	Olympia Stadium
Yozyovon	Yozyovon	
Zaamin	Zaamin	

== League table ==
Pos	Team	Pld	W	D	L	GF	GA	GD	Pts	Promotion, qualification or relegation
1	Nurafshon	32	19	7	6	67	32	+35	64 (Note: Head-to-head results: Sherdor 2–3 Nurafshon, Nurafshon 6–1 Sherdor.)	Qualification to promotion play-offs
2	Sherdor	32	20	4	8	79	42	+37	64	Qualification to promotion play-offs
3	G'ijduvon	32	18	6	8	59	44	+15	60	
4	Zaamin	32	18	3	11	64	40	+24	57	
5	Yozyovon	32	14	3	15	45	55	−10	45	
6	Labsa	32	13	4	15	47	48	−1	43	
7	Iftikhor	32	12	4	16	42	60	−18	40	
8	Khotira-79	32	7	2	23	31	83	−52	23	Relegation
9	Lokomotiv-BFK	32	6	1	25	39	69	−30	19	Relegation

Source: PFL.uz
Rules for classification: 1) Points; 2) Head-to-head points; 3) Head-to-head goal difference; 4) Head-to-head goals scored; 5) Goal difference; 6) Goals scored; .

== Promotion play-offs ==
26 November 2018

Mash'al	4–0	Sherdor
Humoyun Murtazayev 36' 90+3'; Abdulla Olimov 81' 88'	Report

Dustlik Stadium, Dustlik
Attendance: 104
Referee: Shavkat Nasibullaev

27 November 2018

Istiqlol	2–1	Nurafshon
Abdukholiq Kurbanov 8' (pen.); Hamidullo Abduhamidov 59'	Report	Farrukh Shotursunov 66'

AGMK Stadium, Olmaliq
Attendance: 520
Referee: Akobir Shukrullaev

Mash'al and Istiqlol qualified for 2018 Uzbekistan Super League relegation play-off
