= Vladislav Rusanov (footballer) =

Russian footballer

Personal information
- Full name: Vladislav Valeryevich Rusanov
- Date of birth: 1 August 2001 (age 25)
- Place of birth: Saint Petersburg, Russia
- Height: 1.92 m (6 ft 4 in)
- Position: Goalkeeper

Team information
- Current team: Mash'al
- Number: 73

Youth career
- 2017–2019: Zenit Saint Petersburg

Senior career*
Years	Team	Apps	(Gls)
2020–2022	Energetik-BGU Minsk	14	(0)
2023–2025	Leon Saturn Ramenskoye	53	(0)
2026–	Mash'al	2	(0)
- * Club domestic league appearances and goals as of 2 November 2025

Vladislav Valeryevich Rusanov (Russian: Владислав Валерьевич Русанов, known until 2020 as Vladislav Bakonin, (Russian: Владислав Баконин); born 1 August 2001) is a Russian professional footballer who plays for Uzbekistan Super League club Mash'al.

== Personal life ==
In 2020, he changed his last name from Bakonin to Rusanov.
