= 2006 Uzbekistan Cup =

Tournament details
- Country: Uzbekistan
- Dates: March – November 2006
- Teams: 36

Final positions
- Champions: Pakhtakor (8th title)
- Runners-up: Mash'al
- Third place: Neftchi
- Fourth place: Traktor

Tournament statistics
- Matches played: 48
- Goals scored: 160 (3.33 per match)

2006 Uzbekistan Cup (Футбол бўйича 2006-йилги Ўзбекистон Кубоги) was a football tournament organized by the Uzbekistan Football Federation, in which 35 clubs participated. Starting from the first round, the tournament was held in a knockout system. The final match took place on 8 November 2006 at the Pakhtakor Central Stadium in Tashkent between Mashʼal and Pakhtakor. Pakhtakor won the cup for the eighth time.

== Round of 16 ==
Pairings	Date	Note
Pairings	18 March	Note
Qizilqum (Zarafshan) – Sogdiana (Jizzakh)	1:0	
Bukhara – Mash’al (Muborak)	4:3	
Almalyk – Nasaf (Qarshi)	1:1	Penalties. 6:7
Khorezm (Urgench) – Dinamo (Samarkand)	4:1	
Shurtan (Guzar) – Andijan	1:1	Penalties. 4:3
	27 March	
Dinamo 01 (Qarshi) – Bunyodkor (Tashkent)	0:2	
	5 June	
Neftchi (Fergana) – Metallurg (Bekabad)	5:0	
	11 June	
Navbahor (Namangan) – Pakhtakor (Tashkent)	0:3	

== Quarter-finals ==
Pairings	Date	Note
Pairings	10 June	Note
Bunyodkor (Tashkent) – Shurtan (Guzar)	2:1	
	16 June	
Nasaf (Qarshi) – Khorezm (Urgench)	4:1	
Neftchi (Fergana) – Qizilqum (Zarafshan)	3:0	
	7 July	
Pakhtakor (Tashkent) – Bukhara	3:0	

== Semi-finals ==
Pairings	1st Leg	2nd Leg
Pairings	26 July	30 July
Bunyodkor (Tashkent) – Nasaf (Qarshi)	3:0	2:0
Pakhtakor (Tashkent) – Neftchi (Fergana)	4:1	2:3

== Final ==
Final match	Date	Score
Bunyodkor (Tashkent) – Pakhtakor (Tashkent)	14 November	1:0
