= Sport-Saller =

German sportswear company

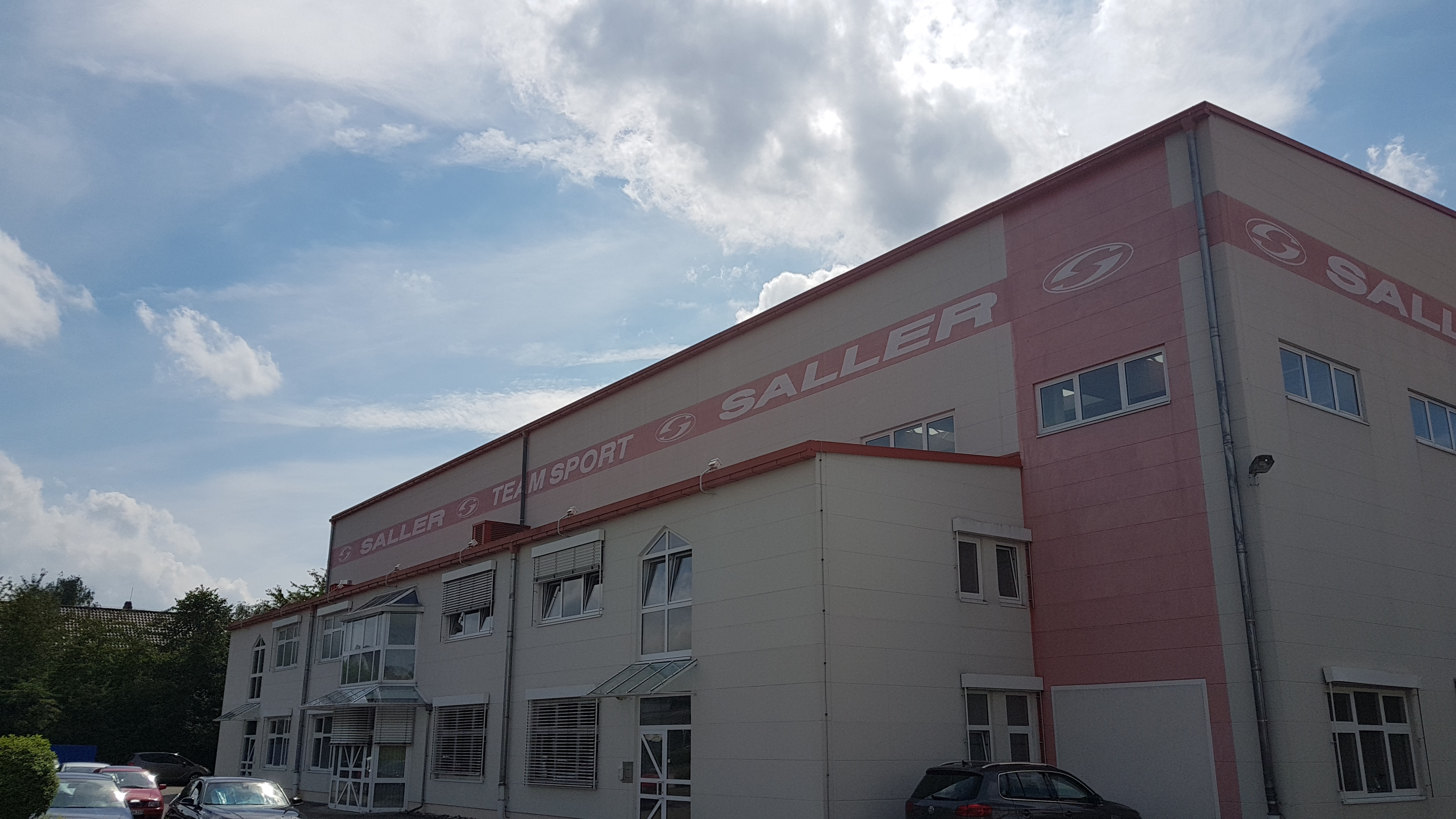
- Sport-Saller factory and outlet center in Weikersheim
- Industry: Sport; Textile
- Founded: 1972; 54 years ago
- Founder: Richard Saller
- Headquarters: Weikersheim, Germany
- Area served: Eastern Europe, West Africa
- Key people: Margot Saller (owner); Richard Saller (authorized signatory)
- Products: Sportswear
- Number of employees: 50+
- Website: sport-saller.de

Sport-Saller is a German sports equipment mail order company which focuses on association football products. The company was established in 1972 and is based in Weikersheim, Baden-Württemberg.

Sports-Saller sells and distributes football equipment for teams and clubs, mainly kit uniforms, balls, and boots. The company manufactures and commercilises not only its own products but other brands goods as well.

== History ==
Sport-Saller was created in 1972 in Tauberrettersheim, Germany, by Richard Saller, who was a football coach at that time. Saller originally started as a footballing business, but soon turned its attention to creating a sporting goods company that develops, produces, and sells their own sportswear. Saller first opened a sportswear store with the idea of being able to equip local sports teams with the equipment they needed.

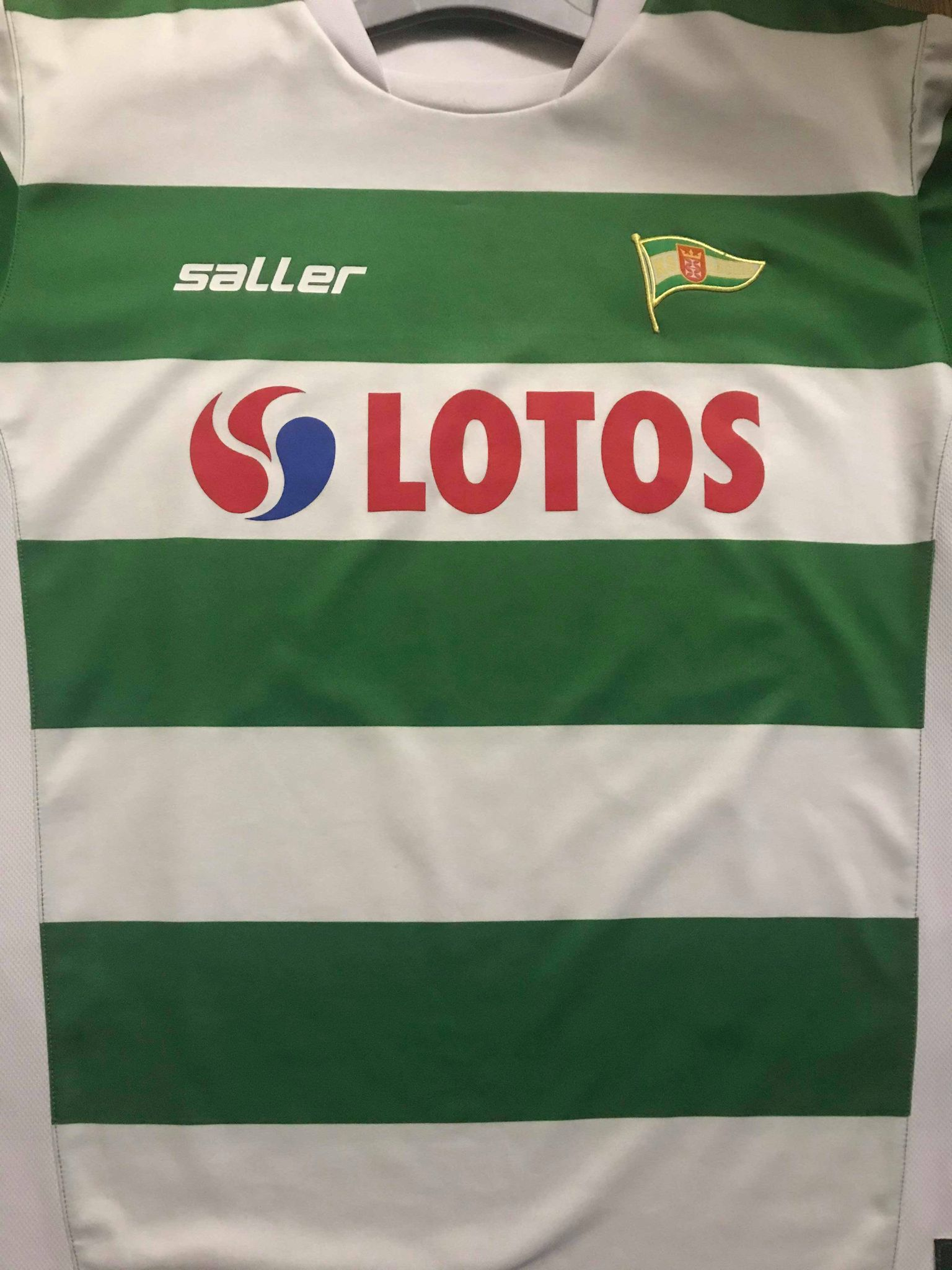
The 2015–16 Lechia Gdańsk home shirt, manufactured by Sport-Saller

In 1990 Sport-Saller moved to Weikersheim where the company had built an office building, a sports shop, storage space, areas to organise dispatches, and areas for manufacturing. Along with the new office building a modern sports hall was built to help train motivated and talented young players. Saller also sponsor a series of initiatives, with the company promoting and sponsoring a series of football and sports schools for children around Germany

In 2008, they replaced Uhlsport as the main suppliers of Arminia Bielefeld but lost the contract 12 years later to Joma Sport. In the past they also supplied Union Berlin replacing Nike in 2002 and 1. FC Köln in the years 2002-2005 until when they were replaced by Adidas.

The company expanded its operations to Georgia in 2008 and opened a trade centre in Tbilisi, supplying the Georgian Olympic Committee.

In 2010, they signed a contract with the Gambia Football Federation with the deal including all the national teams, namely U17, U20 and U23 teams, the senior national team and the female national team.

In 2014, they supplied the kits of Lechia Gdańsk on a 2-year contract.

In May 2018 they designed a special shirt for the last game of the season for Jahn Regensburg.

In 2020, they supplied kits of Sandecja Nowy Sącz.

== Sponsorship teams ==
Teams kits currently manufactured by Saller (2023)

=== Football ===
==== National teams ====
- (The Gambia) Gambia

==== Club teams ====
- (Belgium) K.F.C. Dessel Sport
- (Belgium) K.S.K. Heist
- (Belarus) FC Dinamo Minsk
- (Belarus) Neman Grodno
- (Bulgaria) FC Fratria
- (Georgia (country)) Spaeri
- (Germany) SC Paderborn 07
- (Germany) FV Engers 07
- (Germany) FC Einheit Rudolstadt
- (Germany) SC Waldgirmes
- (Germany) OSC Vellmar
- (Germany) FV Bad Vilbel
- (Germany) SV Curslack-Neuengamme
- (Germany) FC Rot-Weiß Erfurt
- (Germany) ASV Neumarkt
- (Germany) 1. FC Garmisch-Partenkirchen
- (Germany) SV Waldhausen
- (Germany) Meiendorfer SV
- (Germany) SG Bad Soden 1911 eV
- (Greece) A.E. Kifisia
- (Greece) PAE Chania
- (Greece) Thyella Rafina
- (Guinea) Horoya AC
- (Hungary) Békéscsaba
- (Netherlands) Helmond Sport
- (Poland) Sandecja Nowy Sącz
- (Romania) UTA Arad
- (Senegal) Bloc 16 Academy Diamaguene
- (Uzbekistan) Turon

=== Fistball ===
- (Germany) TV Oberndorf

=== Roller hockey ===
- (Germany) RSC Cronenberg
- (Germany) ERG Iserlohn

=== Volleyball ===
- (Germany) TSV Röttingen 1895 e.V.

=== Former Sponsorships ===
Teams whose kits have previously been made by Saller

- (Armenia) FC Alashkert
- (Bulgaria) Westerlo
- (Bulgaria) FC Levski Karlovo
- (Georgia (country)) Georgian Olympic Team
- (Georgia (country)) Saburtalo Tbilisi
- (Georgia (country)) Torpedo Kutaisi
- (Germany) 1. FC Köln
- (Germany) 1. FC Union Berlin
- (Germany) Arminia Bielefeld
- Germany national beach soccer team
- Germany national mini football team
- (Germany) Goslarer SC 08
- (Germany) VfR Aalen
- (Germany) SC Wiedenbrück 2000
- (Germany) SF Dorfmerkingen
- (Germany) TuS Koblenz
- Kuwait
- Lithuania
- (Poland) Lechia Gdańsk
- (Poland) Miedź Legnica
- (Uzbekistan) Mash'al Mubarek
- (Uzbekistan) Turon Yaypan
