= FC Dinamo Samarqand =

Association football club in Uzbekistan

Dinamo Samarqand
- Full name: Football Club Dinamo Samarqand
- Nickname: The Lions (Uzbek: Sherlar)
- Founded: 1960; 66 years ago
- Ground: Dinamo Stadium; Samarkand
- Capacity: 13,800
- President: Akbar Shukurov
- Head coach: Vadim Abramov
- League: Uzbekistan Super League
- 2025: 4th of 16
- Website: http://www.fcdinamo.uz
Home colours	Away colours

FC Dinamo Samarqand (Uzbek: Dinamo Samarqand futbol klubi) is an Uzbek professional football club based in the city of Samarkand. The club currently plays in the Uzbekistan Super League.

== History ==
FC Dinamo Samarqand is one of the oldest clubs in Uzbekistan. It was founded in 1960. The club started in zone two of the Soviet Class B league. In 1992 the club played in the Uzbek League under the name Maroqand Samarqand. Between 1994 and 1998 seasons they competed in the First League. In the 2000 season FK Dinamo were runners-up of the Uzbek Cup, losing in the final against Dustlik and finishing the league in 4th place, which is their highest ranking.

=== Club names ===
- 1960–1963: Dinamo Samarqand
- 1963–1967: Spartak Samarqand
- 1967–1968: Sogdiana Samarqand
- 1968–1970: FK Samarqand
- 1970–1976: Stroitel Samarqand
- 1976–1991: Dinamo Samarqand
- 1991–1993: Maroqand Samarqand
- 1993–1997: Dinamo Samarqand
- 1997–1998: Afrosiyob Samarqand
- 1998–2000: FK Samarqand
- 2000–2008: FK Samarqand-Dinamo
- 2008–present: FK Dinamo Samarqand

=== Domestic history ===
Season	League									Uzbek Cup	Top goalscorer		Manager
Season	Div.	Pos.	Pl.	W	D	L	GS	GA	P	Uzbek Cup	Name	League	Manager
1992	1st	10th	32	8	10	14	29	46	26	Semifinal	(Uzbekistan) Khamza Jabborov	17	(Russia) Nikolai Solovyov
1993	1st	16th	30	6	3	21	22	59	15	Quarterfinal	(Uzbekistan) Aleksandr Babayan	4	(Uzbekistan) Rustam Istamov
1994	2nd	2nd	34	22	7	5	81	29	51	Quarterfinal	(Uzbekistan) Khamza Jabborov	24	
1995	1st	11th	30	10	5	15	24	37	35	R32			
1996	1st	10th	30	11	1	18	36	45	34	R1	(Uzbekistan) Khamza Jabborov	12	
1997	1st	15th	34	8	8	18	35	73	32	R1			
1998	2nd	2nd	38	26	8	4	105	44	86	Last 16	(Uzbekistan) Timur Iskanderov	30	
1999	1st	5th	30	15	8	7	57	38	53	Runners Up			
2000	1st	4th	38	24	3	11	92	47	75	Runners Up			(Tajikistan) Khakim Fuzailov
2001	1st	12th	34	14	3	17	62	68	45	Last 16			(Tajikistan) Khakim Fuzailov
2002	1st	13th	30	9	5	16	24	46	32	R32			(Tajikistan) Khakim Fuzailov
2003	1st	8th	30	11	2	17	40	46	35	Last 16			(Uzbekistan) Berador Abduraimov
2004	1st	13th	26	6	2	18	25	48	20	R32	(Uzbekistan) Asqar Beknazarov	5	
2005	1st	8th	26	11	3	12	28	32	36	Last 16	(Uzbekistan) Umid Isoqov	6	
2006	1st	8th	30	12	4	14	39	39	40	Last 16	(Uzbekistan) Bahodir Nasimov	9	
2007	1st	5th	30	14	8	8	48	36	50	Quarterfinal	(Uzbekistan) Farhod Tadjiyev	20	(Turkmenistan) Täçmyrat Agamyradow
2008	1st	6th	30	12	6	12	40	30	42	Quarterfinal	(Uzbekistan) Ilyos Qurbonov	11	(Turkmenistan) Täçmyrat Agamyradow (Uzbekistan) Azamat Abduraimov
2009	1st	9th	30	11	5	14	44	42	38	Last 16			(Uzbekistan) Azamat Abduraimov
2010	1st	12th	26	6	9	11	28	33	27	Quarterfinal	(Uzbekistan) Jafar Irismetov	11	(Uzbekistan) Azamat Abduraimov (Uzbekistan) Viktor Djalilov
2011	1st	10th	26	8	5	13	23	25	29	Quarterfinal	(Uzbekistan) Ivan Nagaev	6	(Uzbekistan) Viktor Djalilov (Uzbekistan) Akhmad Ubaydullaev
2012	1st	9th	26	9	2	15	27	29	29	Last 16	(Uzbekistan) Ruzimboy Ahmedov	11	(Uzbekistan) Akhmad Ubaydullaev
2013	1st	8th	26	8	8	10	28	36	32	R32	(Uzbekistan) Farrukh Shotursunov	10	(Uzbekistan) Kamo Gazarov (Uzbekistan) Ravshan Khaydarov
2014	1st	10th	26	8	4	14	25	39	28	Quarterfinal	(Uzbekistan) Sanat Shikhov	7	(Uzbekistan) Ravshan Khaydarov (Turkmenistan) Täçmyrat Agamyradow
2015	1st	16th	30	6	7	17	28	48	25	R32	(Uzbekistan) Kamoliddin Murzoev	8	(Uzbekistan) Täçmyrat Agamyradow (Uzbekistan) Bakhrom Khakimov
2016	2nd	1st	32	26	4	2	86	19	82	R32	(Uzbekistan) Amirjon Safarov	22	(Uzbekistan) Bakhrom Khakimov (Uzbekistan) Ilkhom Sharipov
2017	1st	12th	30	8	8	14	21	35	32	Semifinal	(Uzbekistan) Amirjon Safarov	4	(Uzbekistan) Ilkhom Sharipov (Germany) Edgar Gess (Uzbekistan) Oleg Tyulkin
2018	2nd	5th	32	15	7	10	41	26	52	Last 16			
2019	1st	14th	26	6	6	14	25	47	24	R2	(Uzbekistan) Kadambay Nurmetov	5	
2020	2nd	3rd	20	9	5	6	25	19	32	2QR			
2021	2nd	2nd	20	11	2	7	33	28	35	R16			(Tajikistan) Khakim Fuzailov

== Stadium ==
Dinamo Samarqand play their home matches at Dinamo Stadium. The stadium was built in 1963 and originally held 13,800 spectators. In 2011, the stadium underwent renovation works.

== Players ==
=== Current squad ===
As of 25 August, 2026

Note: Flags indicate national team as defined under FIFA eligibility rules; some limited exceptions apply. Players may hold more than one non-FIFA nationality.

No.	Pos.	Nation	Player
1	GK	UZB	Edem Nemanov
2	DF	RUS	Artem Radaev
3	DF	MDA	Mihail Stefan
4	MF	UZB	Nurillo Tukhtasinov
6	DF	UZB	Jakhongir Urozov
7	MF	UZB	Sanjar Kodirkulov
8	FW	UZB	Azizbek Amonov
9	FW	UZB	Mirjahon Mirakhmadov
10	FW	UZB	Anvar Khojimirzaev
11	MF	UZB	Khislat Khalilov
13	GK	UZB	Ravshanbek Yagudin
14	FW	UZB	Bahodir Nasimov
15	MF	UZB	Rasul Yuldashev
16	FW	GUI	Amadou Doumbouya
17	DF	UZB	Salim Mustafoyev

No.	Pos.	Nation	Player
18	MF	UZB	Raul Djeparov
19	FW	UZB	Oybek Khamrakulov
20	DF	UZB	Jaloliddin Jumaboev
21	MF	UZB	Jakhongir Abdusalomov
22	DF	UZB	Ulugbek Abdullaev
24	MF	UZB	Akbar Khudoyberdiev
25	MF	UZB	Oybek Urmonjonov
26	MF	SRB	Marko Stanojević
29	MF	UZB	Abdulakhadjon Khoshimov
30	MF	BIH	Haris Hajdarević
37	FW	UZB	Firdavs Abdurahmonov
44	MF	GHA	Kingsley Sarfo
71	GK	UZB	Sarvar Karimov
77	MF	UZB	Bekhruzbek Oblakulov
—	MF	ARM	Tigran Avanesyan

== Management ==
=== Board of directors ===
Office	Name
President	Akbar Shukurov
Director	Firdavs Karimov
Secretary	Usmon Ibodov

== Historical list of coaches ==
- (Soviet Union) Berador Abduraimov (1980–1981)
- (Soviet Union) Nikolay Kiselyov (1985–1986)
- (Soviet Union) Aleksandr Ivankov (1987–1988)
- (Soviet Union) Vladimir Fedin (1989)
- (Soviet Union) Shavkat Akhmerov (July 1990)
- (Soviet Union) Yuriy Mamedov (July 1990–1991)
- (Uzbekistan) Rustam Istamov (1991)
- (Russia) Nikolai Solovyov (1992)
- (Uzbekistan) Rustam Istamov (1993)
- (Tajikistan) Khakim Fuzailov (2000–2002)
- (Uzbekistan) Berador Abduraimov (Jun 2002–Sep 2003)
- (Turkmenistan) Tachmurad Agamuradov (2007–2008)
- (Uzbekistan) Azamat Abduraimov (2008–2010)
- (Uzbekistan) Viktor Djalilov (2010–2011)
- (Uzbekistan) Akhmad Ubaydullaev (2011–2012)
- (Uzbekistan) Kamo Gazarov (2013)
- (Uzbekistan) Ravshan Khaydarov (2013–2014)
- (Turkmenistan) Tachmurad Agamuradov (2014–2015)
- (Uzbekistan) Bakhrom Khakimov (Jul 7, 2015–Mar 2016)
- (Uzbekistan) Ilkhom Sharipov (Mar 2016–Feb 2017)
- (Uzbekistan) Oleg Tyulkin (2017–2020)
- (Russia) Sergey Lushan (2020–2021)
- (Serbia) Predrag Rogan (Jan 2022-May 2022)
- (Uzbekistan) Vadim Abramov (Aug 2022–)

== Honours ==
- Uzbekistan Pro League:
  - Champions (1): 2016
