= FC Turon =

Uzbekistani football club

FC Turon Yaypan
- Full name: Futbol Klubi Turon Yaypan
- Founded: 2017; 9 years ago
- Ground: Uzbekistan Stadium; Yaypan, Uzbekistan
- Capacity: 7,306
- Coach: Igor Shkvirin
- League: Uzbekistan Pro League
- 2023: 13th of 14th (relegated)
Home colours	Away colours

FK Turon is an Uzbekistani football club based in Yaypan that currently plays in the Uzbekistan Pro League.

== History ==
=== Domestic history ===
Season	League									Uzbek Cup	Top goalscorer		Manager
Season	Div.	Pos.	Pl.	W	D	L	GS	GA	P	Uzbek Cup	Name	League	Manager
2020	2nd	1st	20	11	5	4	31	19	38	First qualifying round			(Uzbekistan) I.Ismoilov
2021	1st	14th	26	3	8	15	16	37	17	Round of 16	(Belarus) Uladzislaw Kasmynin (South Korea) Kim Bo-yong (Uzbekistan) Sunatilla Abdullajonov (Uzbekistan) Fozil Musaev (Uzbekistan) Muzaffar Muzaffarov	2	(Uzbekistan) I.Ismoilov (Poland) B.Baniak (Uzbekistan) I.Shkvyrin

== Current squad ==
As of 17 May 2021

Note: Flags indicate national team as defined under FIFA eligibility rules; some limited exceptions apply. Players may hold more than one non-FIFA nationality.

No.	Pos.	Nation	Player
1	GK	UZB	Mirzoxidjon Jalilov
2	DF	UZB	Abduqahhor Hojiakbarov
3	DF	UZB	Davron Umirov
4	DF	UZB	Asliddin Toshtemirov
5	DF	UZB	G‘iyosjon Komilov
8	MF	UZB	Sunnat Ermatov
9	FW	UZB	Jasurbek Xakimov
10	MF	UZB	Javokhir Sokhibov
11	FW	UZB	Asilbek Qayumov
13	GK	UZB	Amal Shavketov
14	DF	UZB	Sardorbek Xursandov
17	MF	UZB	Muzaffar Muzaffarov
18	MF	UZB	Fozil Musaev
20	DF	UZB	Doston Meliqo‘ziev
21	FW	UZB	Orifxo‘ja Abduholiqov
22	MF	UZB	Abdulazizxon Abdurashidov

No.	Pos.	Nation	Player
23	MF	UZB	Abdurahmon Abdulhaqov
25	DF	UZB	Ismoiljon Oxunjonov
28	MF	UZB	Musobek Muzaffarov
29	FW	UZB	Mirjalol Mirzaev
30	MF	SRB	Siniša Babić
32	DF	UZB	Jahongir Mehmonov
46	DF	UZB	Asadbek Saidxonov
51	DF	UZB	Abdug'offor Maxmudov
55	DF	SRB	Dajan Ponjević
63	MF	TJK	Umarjon Sharipov
65	DF	UZB	Otabek Miraliyev
77	FW	UZB	Bilolxon Toshmirzaev
80	FW	UZB	Rustamxon Azimov
87	GK	UZB	Akmal Ortiqov
95	DF	UZB	Elnurbek Turg'unov
96	GK	UZB	Islom Abdullaev

== Honours ==
=== Domestic ===
- Uzbekistan Pro-B League
  - Champions (1): 2019
