= Khumoyun Murtozoyev =

Uzbekistani footballer

Khumoyun Murtazoyev
Personal information
- Full name: Khumoyun Abdisamat o'gli Murtazoyev
- Date of birth: 9 November 1992 (age 34)
- Place of birth: Qashqadaryo, Uzbekistan
- Position: Forward

Team information
- Current team: Mash'al
- Number: 10

Youth career
- Mash'al

Senior career*
Years	Team	Apps	(Gls)
2015–2018	Mash'al	75	(24)
2019	Nasaf	26	(14)
2020	→ Bunyodkor (loan)	7	(1)
2020–2021	Mash'al	23	(7)
2021–2023	Turon	55	(19)
2024–	Mash'al	65	(24)

International career^{‡}
2020	Uzbekistan	1	(0)
- * Club domestic league appearances and goals as of 29 July 2026 ‡ National team caps and goals as of 00:00, 23 February 2020 (UTC)

Khumoyun Murtozayev (Uzbek Cyrillic: Хумоюн Муртозаев; born 9 November 1992) is an Uzbekistani footballer who plays as a forward for Mash'al.

== Career ==
=== International ===
He made his debut for main team, Uzbekistan on 23 February 2020 in a friendly match against Jordan.

Uzbekistan national team
Year	Apps	Goals
2020	1	0
Total	1	0

Statistics accurate as of match played 23 February 2020.
