= FC Khorazm =

Xorazm
- Full name: Xorazm FK Urganch
- Founded: 1972; 54 years ago
- Ground: Xorazm Stadium; Urgench, Uzbekistan
- Capacity: 13.500
- Chairman: Nurulla Hasanov
- Manager: Bakhodir Hakimov
- Coach: Vali Sultonov
- League: Uzbekistan Super League
- 2025: 14th
Home colours	Away colours

Xorazm FK Urganch is an Uzbek professional football club based in Urgench, that competes in the top tier Uzbekistan Super League. It was founded in 1989.

== History ==
=== Name Changes ===
- 1989–1990: Jaykhun
- 1991–1992: Kuruvchi
- 1993–1996: Dynamo
- 1997–2001: Xorazm
- 2002: Jaykhun
- 2003–present: Xorazm

=== Soviet League ===
In 1989, the football club 'Jaykhun' was founded in Urgench. It replaced 'Khanki' (Xonqa), another team from the Khorazm Region, in the Soviet Second League.

The team was unsuccessful in the first round under the leadership of Oleg Bugaev. However, the situation changed after the arrival of the experienced specialist Valeriy Vasilenko, who saved 'Jaykhun' from relegation. The club finished the season in 16th place.

In 1990, Zakhidulla Sanatulov took over as head coach. But the club continued to play poorly and in September, Sanatulov was replaced by Yuriy Gordeyev. In the last rounds he managed to improve their position and the team finished in 17th place.

In 1991, the club changed its name to 'Kuruvchi'. The team was led by local expert Allabergen Matniyazov, but the season ended in failure and the club finished last in the league.

=== Uzbek League ===
==== 1993–1996 ====
In 1993, the club was renamed 'Dynamo' and transferred to the jurisdiction of OVD Khorazm. In the same season, the club became champion of the Khorazm Region and earned the right to take part in the transitional tournament against the winners of the other regional leagues.

From their result in the transitional tournament, the club did not qualify for the first league. However, the leader of the Uzbekistan Football Association had a meeting with the Khorazm team and allowed them to compete in the sub-elite division. This meant that 'Dynamo' became the first club in Khorazm's history to compete in the Uzbekistan Pro League. In 1994, the team was led by its famous former coach Valeriy Vasilenko.

In the very first match, which took place on the 9th April 1994, the dynamos beat the Chirchiq team 'Kimyogar'. The final score was 2–1.

Their first home match took place on the 23rd April at the Olympia stadium against 'Mebelchi', Yangiyo'l. The match was not very successful for the hosts. They were losing for most of the game, and only scored in the final seconds, ending the game with a score of 1–1.

Their first home win was gained in the next round (26 April). In the match against the Jizzakh team, 'Yigiruvchi', the only goal was scored by Viktor Lukyanova, leading Xorazm to win 1–0. This result allowed Dynamo to move up to 5th place in the results table after four rounds.

Following on from this, the team's fate was not so successful. The Dynamos performed performed unremarkably in the remaining matches and the team finished the first round in second last place with a total of nine points.

The depressing results forced the club leadership to strengthen their line-up and invite in a few experienced players. Among them were Vali Sultanov, Pavel Kaigorodov, Arsen Grigoryan, and Vladimir Merezhko.

=== Domestic history ===
Season	League									Uzbekistan Cup	Top goalscorer		Manager
Season	Div.	Pos.	Pl.	W	D	L	GS	GA	P	Uzbekistan Cup	Name	League	Manager
1994	First league	17	34	8	6	20	27	64	22	17 (18)	(Uzbekistan) Vali Sultonov	7	(Uzbekistan) Valeriy Vasilenko (Uzbekistan) Vladimir Desyatchikov
1995	Uzbek League	1	36	25	6	5	78	34	81	Group stage	(Uzbekistan) Vali Sultonov	18	(Uzbekistan) Botir Mirzaev
1996	Uzbek League	15	30	8	3	19	36	67	27	Last 16	(Uzbekistan) Dmitriy Malin	8	(Uzbekistan) Rakhim Mominov (Uzbekistan) Vladimir Desyatchikov
1997	Uzbek League	10	34	13	3	18	58	77	42	Last 32	(Uzbekistan) Hamza Jabborov	20	(Uzbekistan) Vladimir Desyatchikov (Uzbekistan) Islom Ahmedov
1998	Uzbek League	12	30	10	6	14	39	55	36	Last 32	(Uzbekistan) Hamza Jabborov	10	(Uzbekistan) Islom Ahmedov
1999	Uzbek League	7	30	12	5	13	39	40	41	Last 32	(Uzbekistan) Vladimir Baranov	10	(Uzbekistan) Ruzmet Kuryazov
2000	Uzbek League	19	38	8	6	24	37	67	30	Last 32	(Uzbekistan) Vali Sultonov	10	(Uzbekistan) Ruzmet Kuryazov (Uzbekistan) Olimjon Rakhmonov
2001	First league	7	32	13	7	12	57	53	46	Last 16	(Uzbekistan) Vali Sultonov	11	(Uzbekistan) Olimjon Rakhmonov
2002	First league	7	32	15	9	8	47	36	54	Last 16	(Uzbekistan) Jasur Allanazarov	9	(Uzbekistan) Botir Mirzaev
2003	First league	6	28	13	3	12	40	45	42	Group stage	(Uzbekistan) Odilbek Atajanov	9	(Uzbekistan)
2004	First league	6	40	16	5	19	61	76	53	Last 32	(Uzbekistan) Vali Sultonov	12	(Uzbekistan) Ulugbek Saparov
2005	First league	2	34	27	2	5	93	32	83	Group stage	(Uzbekistan) Mansur Abdullaev	23	(Uzbekistan) Kuat Tureev
2006	Uzbek League	16	30	0	3	27	21	127	3	2QR	(Uzbekistan) Sarvar Ibodullaev	9	(Uzbekistan) Kuat Tureev (Uzbekistan) Oleg Tyulkin
2007	First league	12	38	16	5	17	32	59	53	2QR	(Uzbekistan) Ruzimboy Akhmedov	15	
2008	First league	1	34	24	5	5	70	25	77	1QR	(Uzbekistan) Ruzimboy Akhmedov	22	(Uzbekistan) Vali Sultonov
2009	Uzbek League	10	30	9	11	10	30	39	38	Quarter finals	(Uzbekistan) Ruzimboy Akhmedov (Uzbekistan) Vladimir Baranov	5	(Uzbekistan) Vali Sultonov
2010	Uzbek League	14	26	2	7	17	21	46	13	2QR	(Uzbekistan) Zafar Polvonov	9	(Uzbekistan) Vali Sultonov (Uzbekistan) Bahrom Hakimov (Uzbekistan) Vali Sultonov
2011	First league	5	36	20	9	7	69	29	69	Last 16	(Uzbekistan) Vladimir Gavrilov	24	(Uzbekistan) Vali Sultonov
2012	First league	7	38	18	8	12	52	39	62	Last 16	(Uzbekistan) Marks Quranboyev	9	
2013	First league	6	38	19	6	13	57	42	63	1QR	(Uzbekistan) Murod Bobojonov	19	(Uzbekistan) Adambay Qurbonniyazov (Uzbekistan) Azamat Nurmetov
2014	First league	11	38	15	8	15	52	56	53	2QR	(Uzbekistan) Nizom Norov	13	(Uzbekistan) Mansur Davletov (Uzbekistan) Vali Sultonov
2015	First league	7	34	19	4	11	49	41	42	1QR	(Uzbekistan) Timur Bekchanov	9	(Uzbekistan) Vali Sultonov
2016	First league	7	32	12	6	14	56	50	42	1QR	(Uzbekistan) Umid Tojimov		(Uzbekistan) Umid Tojimov
2017	First league	9	34	13	8	13	52	52	47	2QR	(Uzbekistan) Sardor Matmuratov	12	(Uzbekistan) Aleksandr Yejov
2018	Pro-liga	7	32	9	6	17	51	70	33	Last 16	(Uzbekistan) Temur Ismoilov	11	(Uzbekistan) Aleksandr Yejov
2019	Pro-liga	6	28	14	5	9	58	37	47	Last 32	(Uzbekistan) Timur Bekchanov	12	(Uzbekistan) Aleksandr Yejov
2020	Pro-liga	7	20	6	3	11	23	32	21	1QR	(Uzbekistan) Sardor Matmuratov (Uzbekistan) Sarvar Jumaniyozov	5	(Uzbekistan) Gayrat Shikhov (Uzbekistan) Aleksandr Yejov
2021	Pro-liga	5	20	7	7	6	32	29	28	Group stage	(Uzbekistan) Ruzimboy Akhmedov, (Uzbekistan) Timur Bekchanov	7	(Uzbekistan) Aleksandr Yejov
2022	Pro-liga	4	26	10	5	11	42	40	35	Group stage	(Cameroon) Marsiano Roki	15	(Uzbekistan) Ruslan Ahmedov
2023	Pro-liga	7	20	5	7	8	16	19	22	Quarter finals	(Cameroon) Nevil Mbanuey Tengeg	4	(Uzbekistan)
2024	Uzbek League	6	28	6	11	11	18	30	29				
2025	Uzbek League	14	28	7	6	17	33	39	27				
2026	Uzbek League												

== Current squad ==
As of 29 July, 2026

Note: Flags indicate national team as defined under FIFA eligibility rules; some limited exceptions apply. Players may hold more than one non-FIFA nationality.

No.	Pos.	Nation	Player
1	GK	UZB	Mashkhur Mukhammadzhonov
3	DF	UZB	Ravshanbek Sultonov
5	MF	UZB	Abbos Otakhonov (captain)
7	FW	UZB	Temur Ismoilov
8	MF	UZB	Nodirbek Abdikholikov
10	FW	FRA	Yanis Lhéry
11	MF	UZB	Danila Ezhov
13	MF	BRA	Elzio Lohan
15	DF	UZB	Diyor Ortikboev
17	MF	UZB	Daniil Nugumanov
22	DF	UZB	Sunnatillokh Khamidzhonov
25	DF	SLO	Matija Rom

No.	Pos.	Nation	Player
33	GK	SRB	Nikola Stošić
34	MF	UZB	Suhrob Izzatov
55	DF	UZB	Azizbek Pirmukhamedov
71	MF	UZB	Umid Sultonov
77	MF	UZB	Asadbek Saidkhonov
79	MF	UZB	Azizzhon Akhrorov
88	DF	UZB	Abror Khusinov
90	FW	UZB	Ulugbek Khoshimov
94	MF	UZB	Rustam Abdukhamidov
96	MF	BRA	Rafael Sabino
97	FW	SEN	Boubacar Traorè
99	FW	UZB	Odamboy Olimov

== Personnel ==
=== Current Technical Staff ===
Position	Name
Head Coach	(Uzbekistan) Nurali Khusinov
Assistant Coach	(Uzbekistan) Olimov Shohjahon
Head Scout	(Uzbekistan) Mikhail Kim
Reserve Team Head Coach	(Uzbekistan) Jahongir Sultonov
Reserve Team Assistant Coach	(Uzbekistan) Ulughbek Abdullaev
Doctor	(Uzbekistan) Baxtbek Ruzmatov
Masseur	(Uzbekistan) Valeriy Yusupov

== Management ==
=== Current Board of Directors and Administrators ===
Office	Name
City Mayor	Pulat Babajanov
President and Chairman	Nurulla Husanov
Assistant City Mayor and Club Vice-president	Usmon Jumagaldiyev
Club Director	Vali Sultonov
Club Structure Director	Bobomurod Abdullaev
Team Representative	Ollabergan Matniyazov
Head Accountant	Zarip Akhmedov
Head Administrator	Qakhramon Masharipov
Team Driver	Komil Rakhmatillaev
