= PFC Sementchi =

- Full name: Professional Football Club Sementchi Quvasay
- Nickname: Cement manufacturers
- Founded: 1987
- Ground: Sementchi Stadium
- Capacity: 5,000
- Head coach: Abdumalik Khakimov
- League: Uzbekistan First League (Since 2018 Uzbekistan Pro League)
- 2017: 1st
Home colours	Away colours

Professional Football Club Sementchi Quvasay (Uzbek: "Sementchi" Quvasoy professional futbol klubi / "Цементчи" Қувасой профессионал футбол клуби; Russian: Профессиональный футбольный клуб "Цементчи" Кувасай) – is a professional football club based in Quvasay (Ferghana Region), Uzbekistan. Participant of the Uzbekistan Pro League.

Founded in 1987. The name of the club Sementchi from the Uzbek language is translated as Cement manufacturers.

== History ==
Football club Sementchi founded in 1987. During the USSR Sementchi participated in amateur Championship of Uzbek SSR. Since independence of Uzbekistan since 1992, Sementchi began to participate in the Uzbekistan Second League. in 1997 he was able to win the Uzbekistan Second League and went to the Uzbekistan First League (today called Uzbekistan Pro League). In 1998-2002 Sementchi participated in the Uzbekistan First League.

In the 2002 season, Sementchi finishing second in the Uzbekistan First League, he got an opportunity to participate in the Uzbekistan High League (today called Uzbekistan Super League). 2003 season Sementchi started in the Uzbekistan High League. At the end of the season, took the penultimate 15th place and flew to the Uzbekistan First League.

Until 2007, Sementchi participated in the Uzbekistan First League. In 2008, Sementchi refused to participate in the Uzbekistan First League and the Uzbekistan Cup because of financial problems. In the same year the club was dissolved.

In 2014, Sementchi was reborn and began to participate in the Uzbekistan Second League. In the same season, the team was able to break into Uzbekistan First League. In 2017, taking first place in the Uzbekistan First League, the club was able, for the second time in its history, to get a ticket to the Uzbekistan Super League. In January 2018, it was announced that the Sementchi was not allowed to participate in the Uzbekistan Super League because of a number of outstanding requirements. Thus, the club remained in the Uzbekistan Pro League.

== Home Stadium ==
The Sementchi home stadium is the Stadium Sementchi in Quvasay, which seats 5,000 spectators.

== Honours ==
- Uzbekistan First League:

Winners: 2017
Runner-up: 2002
Third Place: 2000, 2001, 2016

- Uzbekistan Second League:

Winners: 1997, 2014

== Head coaches ==
Period	Head coach
1987—1988	No data
1989	(Soviet Union) Takhir Kapadze
1990—2006	No data
2007	(Uzbekistan) Murad Ismailov
2008—2015	No data
2016—	(Uzbekistan) Abdumalik Khakimov
