= Aral Samalı PFK =

FC Aral Nukus
- Full name: Aral Football Club
- Founded: 1976
- Ground: Turan Stadium
- Capacity: 9.300
- Head Coach: Temur Turdiev
- League: Uzbekistan First League
- 2015: 13th

Aral Samali PFK (Uzbek: Orol Shamoli professional futbol klubi), also known as FC Aral Nokis (Karakalpak: Арал Нөкис футбол клубы) and FC Orol Nukus (Uzbek: Орол Нукус футбол клуби), is an Uzbekistani football club based in Nukus. Currently it plays in the Uzbekistan First League.

== History ==
Before joining the Uzbek League in 1992, Amudarya Nukus played in the Soviet Second League regional zones from 1976 to 1984. In 1991 the club was renamed Aral Nukus. The club played in the Uzbek League for three consecutive seasons from 1992 to 1994, and was relegated to the Uzbekistan First League at the end of the 1994 season.

In 1999 Aral Nukus gained promotion to the top level again, playing in the Uzbek League for two seasons: 2000 and 2001. In the 2001 season the club finished 17th and was relegated to the lower division.

Currently the club plays in the Uzbekistan First League, West conference. In March 2012 before the start of the First League season, the club was renamed from Jaykhun Nukus to Aral Nokis again.

== Historical names ==
- 1976–1989: Amudarya Nukus
- 1990: Aralvodstroevez
- 1991–1999: Aral Nukus
- 2000–: Turon Nukus
- 2007–2012: Jaykhun Nukus
- 2012-2016: Aral Nokis

== Stadium ==
The club's home ground is Turan Stadium which holds 9,300 spectators.

== Managers ==
- (Uzbekistan) Quvvat Tureev (1999–)
- (Uzbekistan) Nagmetulla Kutibayev (2013–2016)
- (Uzbekistan) Temur Turdiev (2016–)

== Sources ==
- Kazakov, Yevgeniy (2019), История чемпионатов СССР по футболу [The history of the USSR football championships] (in Russian), vol. 1 (1936-1969), Izdatelskiye Resheniya, ISBN 978-5-0050-7970-1
