= G'uzor Stadium =

Stadium in G'uzor, Uzbekistan

Coordinates: 38°37′5.3″N 66°15′32.9″E

Ghuzor Stadium
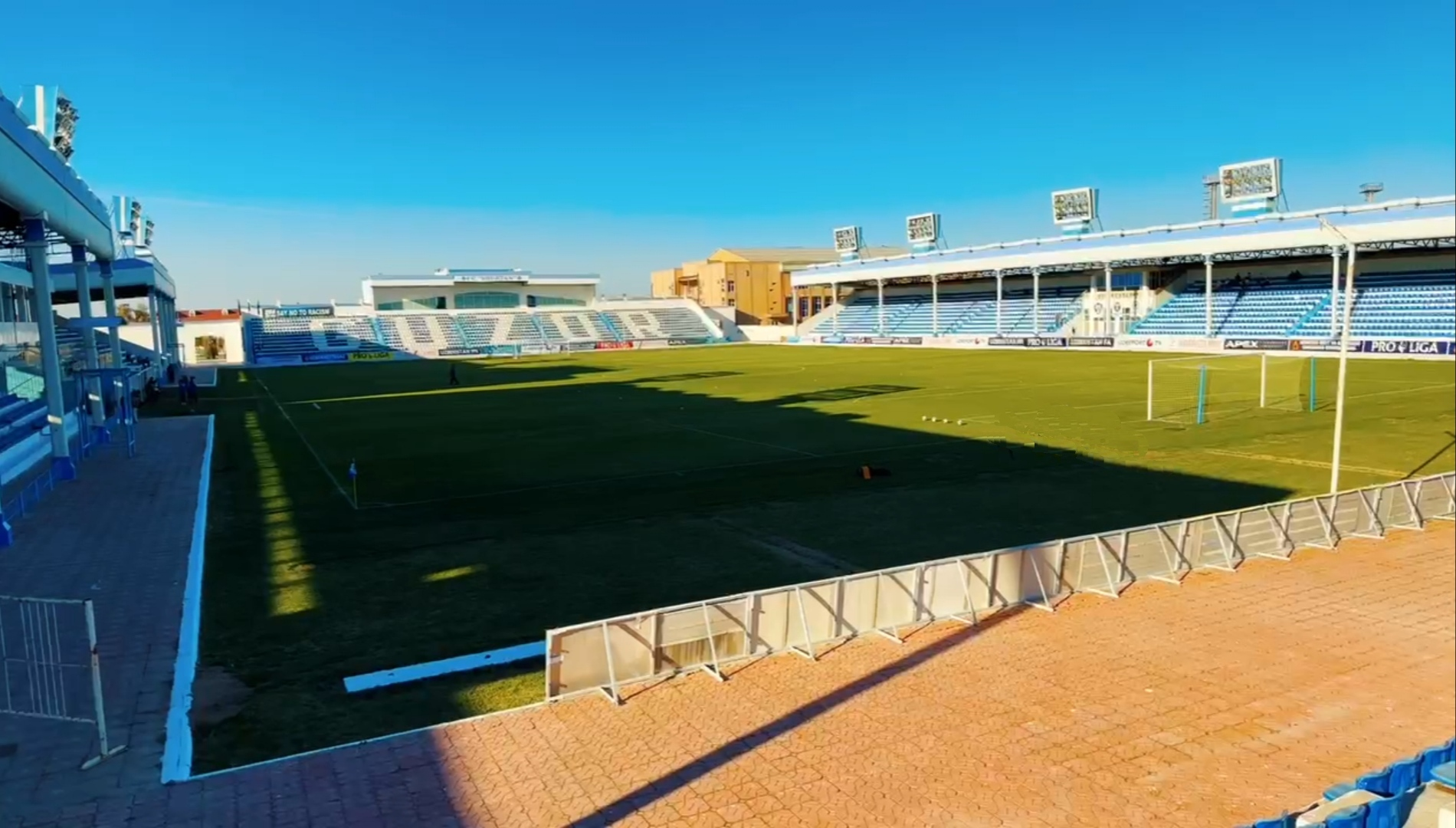
- Interactive map of Ghuzor Stadium
- Location: G'uzor, Uzbekistan
- Capacity: 8,000 (football)
- Surface: grass

Tenant
- FC Shurtan Guzar

G'uzor Stadium is the main stadium of the hometown club FC Shurtan Guzar. It has been recently renovated.
