= FC Istiqlol Fergana =

Association football club in Uzbekistan

FC Istiqlol
- Full name: Istiqlol futbol klubi
- Founded: 2016; 10 years ago
- Ground: Stadion Istiqlol; Fergana
- Capacity: 20,000
- Chairman: Quvasoy Tamir Qurilish
- Manager: Sergey Lebedev
- League: Uzbekistan Pro League
Home colours	Away colours

Istiqlol futbol klubi is an Uzbek professional football club based in Fergana. The club plays in Uzbekistan Pro League.

== History ==
The club was formed 2016 under the name Istiqlol in Fergana.
