= Xorazm Stadium =

Coordinates: 41°33′58″N 60°36′18″E

Xorazm Stadium is a multi-use stadium in Urgench, Uzbekistan. It is currently used mostly for football matches and is the home stadium of Xorazm FK Urganch. The stadium holds 25,000 people.
