= FC Oqtepa =

Oq-Tepa Tashkent
- Full name: Oq-Tepa Toshkent futbol klubi
- Founded: 2000; 26 years ago
- Ground: Oqtepa Stadium
- Capacity: 2,000
- Manager: Server Djeparov
- League: Uzbekistan First League
- 2014: 4th

FK Oq-Tepa (Uzbek: Oq-Tepa futbol klubi, (English: FC Oqtepa) is an Uzbekistani football club based in Tashkent. Currently it plays in Uzbekistan First League.

== History ==
The club was founded in 2000. Oqtepa played until 2005 in Uzbekistan Second League in Tashkent league. In the same year club won Tashkent League and promoted to First League.In 2006 club made its debut in First League, finishing the season at 11th position. The 2014 season club played in First League, zone "East". The club finished the season at 4th position after Promotion round which club's best standing in First League ever. In 2014 Uzbekistan Cup Oqtepa reached quarter-final of tournament and lost to Pakhtakor by 2:12 in two leg competition, winning by the way NBU Osiyo, Mash'al Mubarek and Hotira-79 in Round of 16. It is the best club performance in Cup matches.

== League history ==
Season	Div.	Pos.	Pl.	W	D	L	GS	GA	P	Cup	Top Scorer (League)
2006	1st League	11	38	14	6	18	57	63	48		
2007	1st League	11th	38	19	8	11	67	59	65		
2008	1st League	6	34	15	8	11	61	53	53		
2010^{1}	1st League	11th	30	13	2	15	48	49	41		
2011	1st League	16th	30	6	2	22	25	68	20	R32	
2012	1st League	8th	30	15	0	15	67	62	45	-	
2013^{1}	1st League	10th	30	10	7	12	39	48	37	-	Maruf Akmadjonov – 16
2014^{1}	1st League	4th	30	17	4	7	70	41	61	1/4	Sergey Rekun – 12

In 2010–2014 seasons the league position and match statistics after Promotion round is given where club qualified.

== Managers ==
- (Uzbekistan) Rustam Khamdamov (2000–2005)
- (Uzbekistan) Nizom Nortojiev, Otabek Mansurov (2006)
- (Uzbekistan) Otabek Mansurov (2007)
- (Uzbekistan) Ravil Imamov (2008)
- (Uzbekistan) Alexander Mochinov (2010–2011)
- (Uzbekistan) Vokhid Holboev (2012)
- (Uzbekistan) Farkhod Abdurasulov (2012)
- (Uzbekistan) Alexander Tokov (2013)
- (Uzbekistan) Vladimir Anikin (2013 – February 2014)
- (Uzbekistan) Alexander Mochinov (February 2014 – June 2014)
- (Uzbekistan) Furkat Esonboev (June 2014)
- (Uzbekistan) Ildar Sakaev (2014–2019)
- (Uzbekistan) Yaroslav Krushelnitskiy (2019)
- (Uzbekistan) Alexander Yezhov (2019–2020)
- (Uzbekistan) Alisher Shogulomov (2020)
- (Spain) Sergio Marinangeli (2020)
- (Uzbekistan) Server Djeparov (2025–)
