= Dinamo Samarkand Stadium =

Multi-use stadium in Samarkand, Uzbekistan

Coordinates: 39°40′18″N 66°57′57″E

Dinamo Stadium
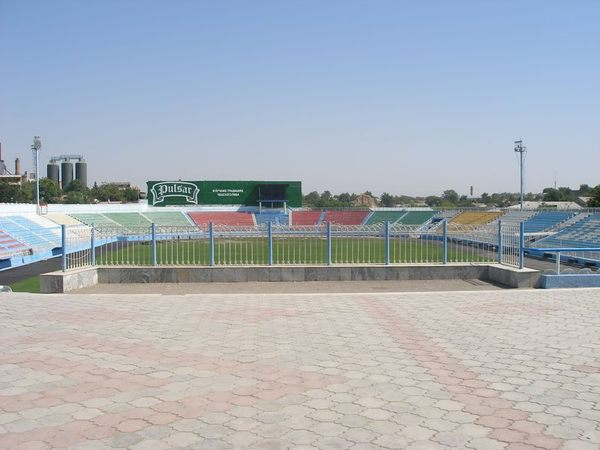
- Interactive map of Dinamo Stadium
- Full name: Dinamo Stadium
- Location: Samarkand, Uzbekistan
- Capacity: 16,000 (football)
- Surface: Grass
- Field size: 105x68

Construction
- Built: 1963
- Renovated: 2011
- Expanded: 16,000

Tenant
- Dinamo Samarqand

Dinamo Stadium is a multi-use stadium in Samarkand, Uzbekistan. It is currently used mostly for football matches and is the home stadium of Dynamo Samarkand.

== History ==
The stadium was built in 1963. The original capacity was 13,820 people. After reconstruction works in 2011 the stadium capacity expanded to 16,000. The stadium became all-seater stadium.
