= Gʻuzor =

Gʻuzor Gʻuzor / Ғузoр
- City
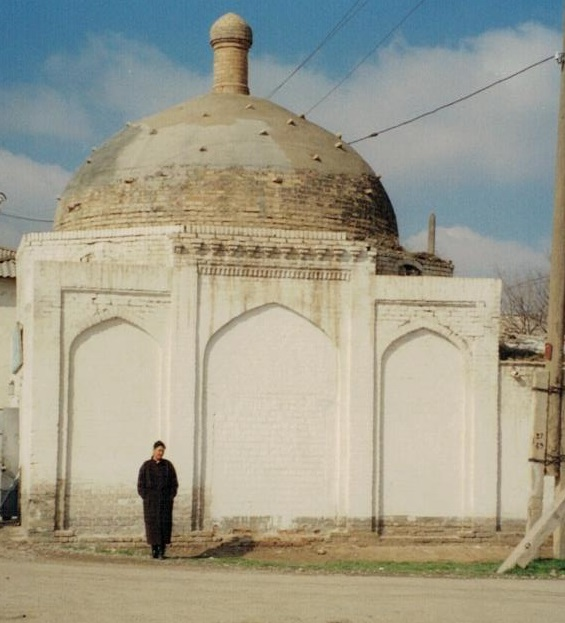

- Location in Uzbekistan
- Coordinates: 38°37′15″N 66°14′53″E
- Country: Uzbekistan
- Region: Qashqadaryo Region
- District: Gʻuzor District

Population (2016)
  - Total: 24,500

Gʻuzor (Uzbek: Gʻuzor; Tajik: Гузор; Russian: Гузар, romanized: Guzar; Persian: گذار) is a city in Qashqadaryo Region in southern Uzbekistan. It serves as the administrative center of Gʻuzor District. Its population is 24,500 (2016).

The town is home to a Polish war cemetery, one of many along the route that General Anders' army took during the Second World War.

== Population ==
Historical population
Year	Pop.	±% p.a.
1979	13,033	—
1989	17,253	+2.84%
2000	21,300	+1.93%
2016	24,500	+0.88%
2022	49,700	+12.51%

== History ==
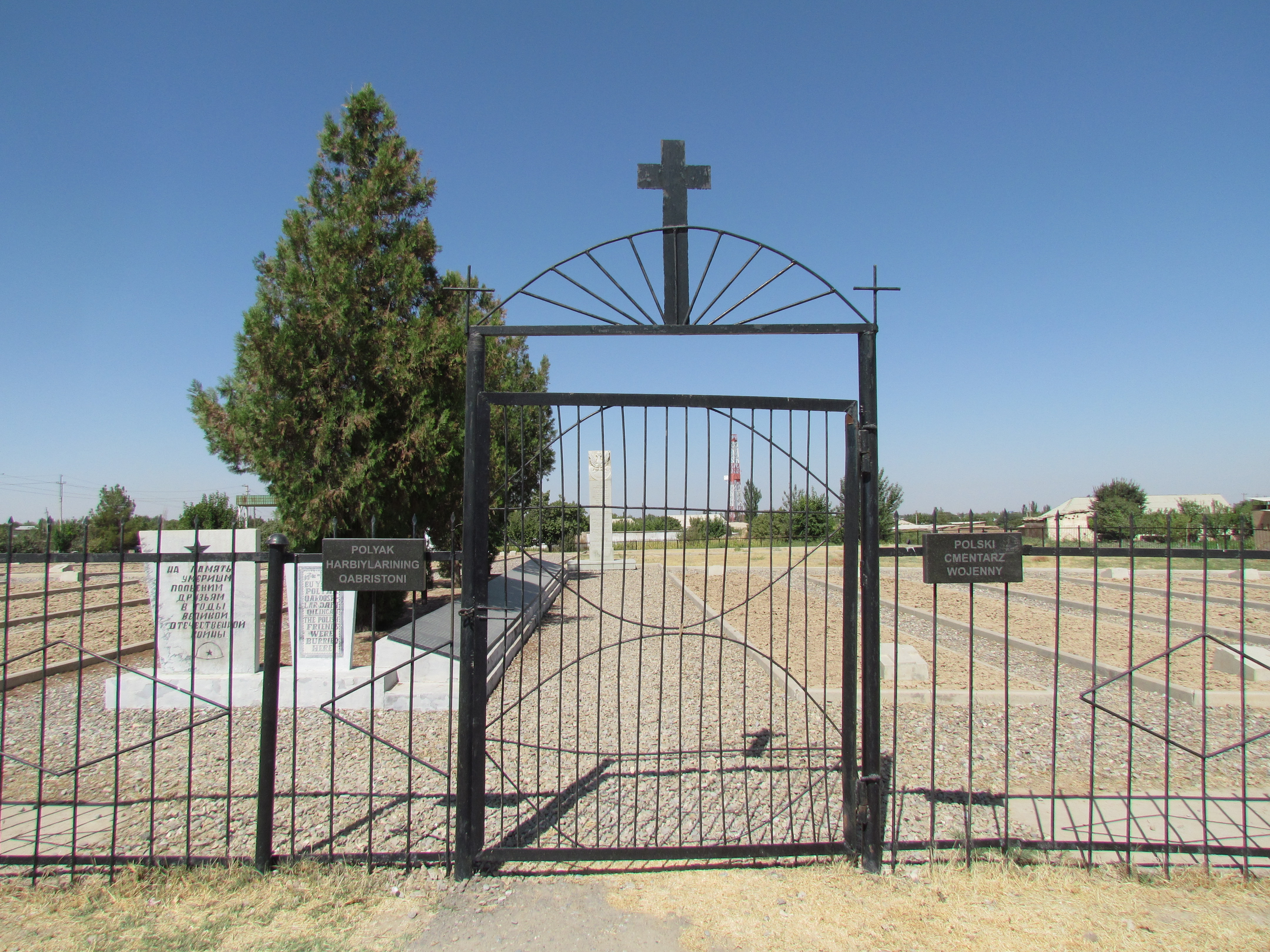
The Polish War Cemetery in G'uzor

Guzar was one of the most important cities of the Khanate of Bukhara.

During World War II, in 1942, the organizational center of the Polish Anders' Army was based in Gʻuzor. Many Polish soldiers and civilians died there to epidemic, and there is a Polish Military Cemetery.

The status of the city was assigned in 1977 (before that - a village).

== Geography ==
Located southeast of Karshi on the river Gʻuzordaryo, a tributary of the Kashkadarya. There is a railway station of the same name in the city - a junction of railroads to Karshi, Kitob and Kumkurgan.

== Sports ==
The football club "Shurtan" is based in Guzar, and in 2005-2013 and 2015-2017 played in the Uzbekistan Major League.

== Economy ==
Processing of agricultural raw materials, construction company, chemical and agrochemical enterprises. Light industry enterprises are located in the city.

== Social objects ==
A new sports complex with a modern football arena. Cemetery-memorial to Polish prisoners of war who were in Uzbekistan in the 1940s
