= FC Mash'al =

Uzbek association football club

Mashʼal Mubarek
- Full name: Mashʼal Muborak Professional Futbol Klubi
- Founded: 1984; 42 years ago
- Ground: Bahrom Vafoev Stadium
- Capacity: 11,000
- League: Uzbekistan Super League
- 2025: 13th
Home colours	Away colours

FC Mash'al Mubarek (Uzbek: Mashʼal Muborak Professional Futbol Klubi) is an Uzbek professional football club based in Mubarek. Mash'al means a torch.

== History ==
The club was founded in 1982. Mashʼal played its first years in province league, later in UzSSR league. In 1993 the club started to play in Uzbekistan First League and two years later after 1994 season club gained promotion to Oliy League. In the 2005 season Mashʼal finished runners-up in League after Pakhtakor which is club's highest achievement in history. Mash'al made its debut in the AFC Champions League in March 2006, but finished its participation in group stage. The same year club reached the Uzbek Cup final.

At the end of 2012 the club was ranked 13th and relegated after playing 11 non-break seasons in the top division. One year later, with new manager Alexander Khomyakov, they gained promotion back to top division.

== Domestic history ==
Season	League									Uzbek Cup	Top goalscorer		Manager
Season	Div.	Pos.	Pl.	W	D	L	GS	GA	P	Uzbek Cup	Name	League	Manager
1993	2nd	6th											(Uzbekistan) Vladimir Nadyarniy
1994	2nd	1st											(Uzbekistan) Boris Serostanov
1995	1st	14th	30	8	5	17	18	58	29				(Uzbekistan) Boris Serostanov
1996	1st	14th	30	8	4	18	28	64	28				(Uzbekistan) Vitaliy Dorofeev
1997	2nd	6th											(Uzbekistan) A.Yumangulov
1998	2nd	7th											(Uzbekistan) A.Yumangulov
1999	2nd	5th											(Uzbekistan) Vladimir Lyubushin
2000	2nd	2nd									(Uzbekistan) Bakhtiyor Davlatov	36	(Uzbekistan) Bakhodir Davlatov
2001	2nd	2nd									(Uzbekistan) Abduvosit Azizov	21	(Uzbekistan) Bakhodir Davlatov
2002	1st	10th	30	9	6	15	36	53	33				(Uzbekistan) Bakhtiyor Boboev
2003	1st	6th	30	13	5	12	48	40	44				(Uzbekistan) Vitaliy Ivanov
2004	1st	10th	26	8	3	15	26	48	27		(Uzbekistan) Jasur Babayev (Uzbekistan) Bakhtiyor Davlatov	7	(Uzbekistan) Bakhodir Davlatov
2005	1st	2nd	26	19	2	5	54	24	59		(Uzbekistan) Shuhrat Mirkholdirshoev	20	(Uzbekistan) Viktor Djalilov
2006	1st	4th	30	18	6	6	50	28	60		(Uzbekistan) Rustam Kodirov	11	(Uzbekistan) Viktor Djalilov (Russia) Viktor Kumykov
2007	1st	3rd	30	22	4	4	62	25	70		(Uzbekistan) Viktor Klishin (Uzbekistan) Rustam Kodirov	14	(Russia) Viktor Kumykov
2008	1st	4th	30	15	7	8	38	26	52		(Uzbekistan) Rustam Kodirov	8	(Russia) Viktor Kumykov
2009	1st	13th	30	8	6	16	32	43	30				(Uzbekistan) Genadiy Kochnev (Uzbekistan) Bakhodir Davlatov
2010	1st	5th	26	10	7	9	22	24	37				(Uzbekistan) Bahodir Davlatov (Kazakhstan) Vladimir Fomichev
2011	1st	5th	26	12	4	10	32	33	40		(Uzbekistan) Zafar Kholmurodov	9	(Kazakhstan) Vladimir Fomichev
2012	1st	13th	26	6	5	15	20	43	23		(Uzbekistan) Samandar Shodmonov	6	(Kazakhstan) Vladimir Fomichev
2013	2nd	1st	30	24	3	3	76	16	75		(Uzbekistan) Zokhir Kuziboyev	20	(Russia) Alexander Khomyakov
2014	1st	5th	26	10	6	10	37	42	36	Round of 32	(Uzbekistan) Zokhir Kuziboyev	14	(Russia) Alexander Khomyakov
2015	1st	7th	30	11	5	14	37	42	38	Round of 16	(Uzbekistan) Zafar Turaev	7	(Russia) Alexander Khomyakov
2016	1st	8th	30	11	5	14	35	41	38	Quarterfinal	(Uzbekistan) Kenja Turaev	8	(Russia) Alexander Khomyakov
2017	1st	7th	30	12	8	10	37	31	44	Quarterfinal			(Russia) Alexander Khomyakov
2018	2nd	2nd	32	19	6	7	53	27	63	Quarterfinal			(Russia) Alexander Khomyakov
2019	2nd	1st	28	16	7	6	49	24	55	Round of 16			(Russia) Alexander Khomyakov
2020	1st	10th	26	8	5	13	23	31	29	Quarterfinal	(Uzbekistan) Khumoyun Murtozoyev	6	(Uzbekistan) Dilyaver Vaniyev
2021	1st	12th	26	5	8	13	21	35	23	Round of 16			(Russia) Alexander Khomyakov
2022	2nd	5th	26	9	6	11	40	33	33	Round of 16			
2023	2nd	4th	20	10	4	6	26	20	34	Group stage			
2024	2nd	1st	28	16	8	4	41	15	56				
2025	1st	13th	30	8	6	16	22	48	30				
2026	1st	16th	30										

=== Continental record ===
As of match played 23 May 2012

Competition	Pld	W	D	L	GF	GA
AFC Champions League	6	2	2	2	7	11
Total	6	2	2	2	7	11

Season	Competition	Round	Club	Home	Away	Aggregate
2006	AFC Champions League	Group B	(Iraq) Al-Minaa	2–2	1–0	3rd
2006	AFC Champions League	Group B	(Saudi Arabia) Al Hilal	2–1	0–5	3rd
2006	AFC Champions League	Group B	(United Arab Emirates) Al Ain	1–1	1–2	3rd

== Honours ==
- Uzbek League
  - Runners-up (1): 2005
- Uzbekistan First League
  - Champions (2): 1994, 2013
- Uzbek Cup
  - Runners-up (1): 2006
- UzPFL Cup
  - Champions (1): 2014

== Current squad ==
As of 29 July, 2026

Note: Flags indicate national team as defined under FIFA eligibility rules; some limited exceptions apply. Players may hold more than one non-FIFA nationality.

No.	Pos.	Nation	Player
1	GK	UZB	Azamat Soyibov
2	DF	UZB	Zafar Akromov
4	DF	SRB	Strahinja Bošnjak
5	DF	UZB	Komilzhon Tozhidinov
7	FW	MKD	Vlatko Stojanovski
8	MF	UZB	Sardor Abduraimov
9	FW	UZB	Ibrokhim Ganikhonov
10	FW	UZB	Khumoyun Murtozoyev
11	FW	UZB	Makhmud Jurabaev
13	FW	UZB	Nuriddin Nuriddinov
14	MF	GHA	Rashid Abubakar
15	DF	UZB	Mukhammadali Alikulov
17	FW	UZB	Anvar Murodov
18	FW	UZB	Ilhom Abdugʻaniyev
19	MF	UZB	Tokhir Tuhtasinov
22	MF	UZB	Nurzhakhon Muzaffarov

No.	Pos.	Nation	Player
23	MF	UZB	Elnurbek Saitmurodov
25	GK	UZB	Samandar Jurabekov
27	FW	UZB	Doniyor Narzullaev
28	DF	UZB	Ergash Ismoilov
35	GK	UZB	Doston Tukhtaboev
37	DF	UZB	Sherzod Fayziev
45	DF	UZB	Sukhrobjon Parmonkulov
50	DF	MNE	Drago Bumbar
55	MF	UZB	Farrukh Toshpulatov
69	DF	RUS	Roman Khadzhiev
73	GK	RUS	Vladislav Rusanov
77	FW	UZB	Izzatillo Abdulkhakov
90	DF	UZB	Farrukhzhon Ibrokhimov
97	FW	NGR	Augustine Chidi
99	DF	UZB	Bobur Askarov
-	MF	UZB	Javohir Ubaydullaev

== Managerial history ==
Name	Period
(Uzbekistan) Vladimir Nadyarniy	1993
(Uzbekistan) Boris Serostanov	1994–95
(Uzbekistan) Vitaliy Dorofeev	1996
(Uzbekistan) A.Yumangulov	1997–98
(Uzbekistan) Vladimir Lyubushin	1999
(Uzbekistan) Bakhodir Davlatov	2000–01
(Uzbekistan) Bakhtiyor Boboev	2002
(Uzbekistan) Vitaliy Ivanov	2003
(Uzbekistan) Bakhodir Davlatov	2004
(Uzbekistan) Viktor Djalilov	2005–06
(Russia) Viktor Kumykov	2006–08
(Uzbekistan) Genadiy Kochnev	2009
(Uzbekistan) Bakhodir Davlatov	2009–10
(Kazakhstan) Vladimir Fomichev	2010–2012
(Uzbekistan) Alexander Khomyakov	2013
