= 2025 Uzbekistan Cup =

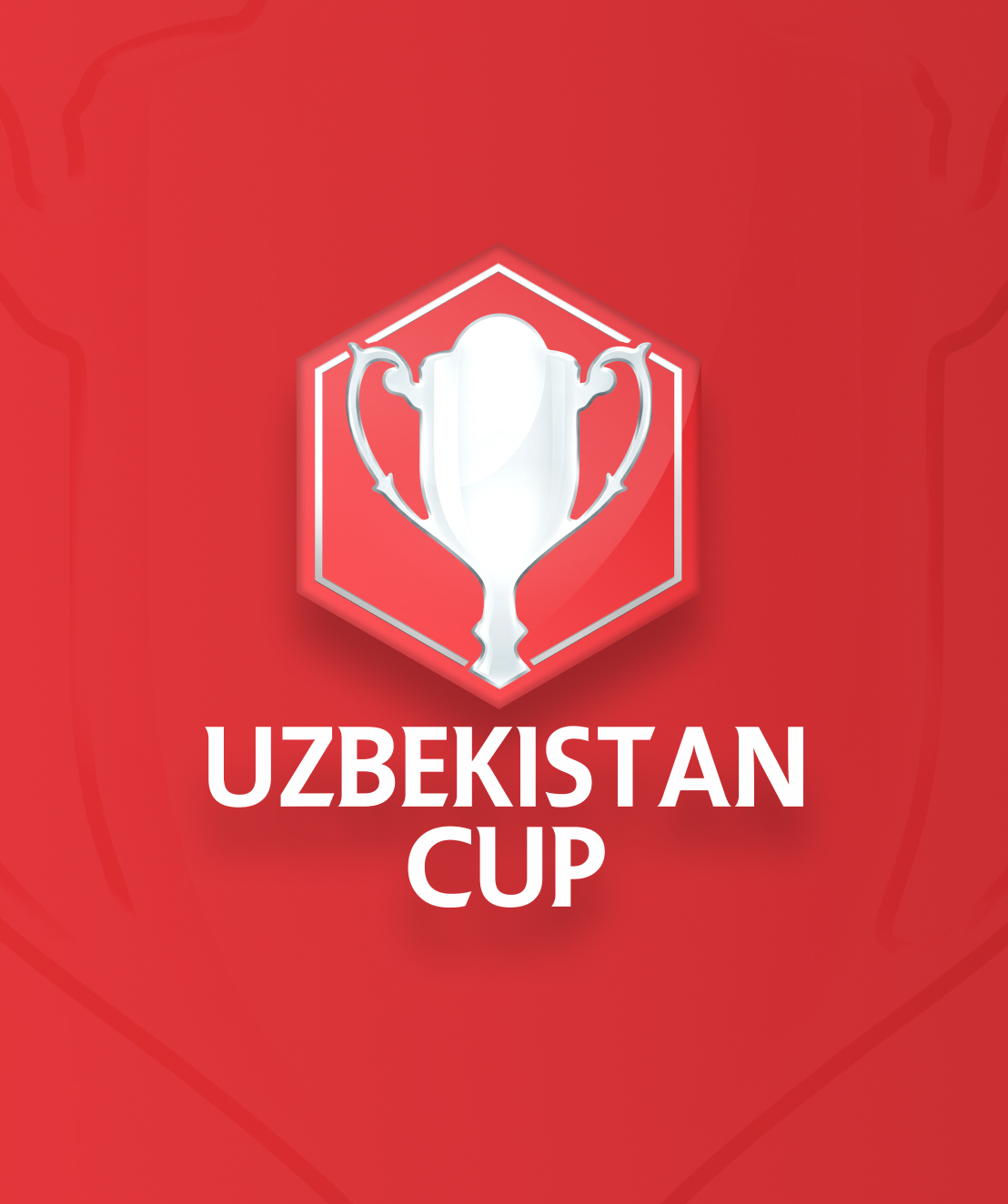

Tournament details
- Dates: 2 February – 29 October 2025
- Teams: 50

Final positions
- Champions: Pakhtakor
- Runners-up: Bukhara

Tournament statistics
- Matches played: 72
- Goals scored: 251 (3.49 per match)
- Attendance: 128,722 (1,788 per match)
- Top goal scorer: Igor Sergeev (5)
- All statistics correct as of September 26, 2025.

2025 Uzbekistan Cup (Uzbek: Футбол бўйича 2025-йилги Ўзбекистон Кубоги) was the 34th season of annual Uzbekistan Cup tournament. The cup winner (Pakhtakor) will qualify to participate in the 2026–27 AFC Champions League Two.

The draw for the group stage was held on February 26 and it was decided that the final would be held at the Bobur Arena, Andijan. Entry to the Uzbekistan Cup was announced on April 1. The qualifying round was held from April 1-4, 2025 and included 16 teams. The group stage matches were held from April 16 to May 21. On May 24, the draw for the quarter-final round was held.

On July 2, the participants of the quarterfinals were determined, and on August 25-the semifinals. On September 25, the Bukhara club reached the final for the first time in its history.

In the final match, the clubs" Pakhtakor" and "Bukhara" met. Pakhtakor won the cup for the 14th time in its history and qualified for the second Asian Champions League 2026-2027.

== Teams ==
Uzbekistan Super League; 2025 season with 16 clubs	Uzbekistan Pro League; 2025 season with 6 clubs	Uzbekistan First League; 2025 season with 18 clubs
Andijan; Bunyodkor; Bukhara; Dinamo Samarkand; Mashal Muborak; Nasaf; Navbahor; Neftchi; AGMK; Pakhtakor; Qizilqum; Kokand 1912; Sogdiana; Surkhon; Khorezm; Shurtan	Aral; FarDU; Jaykhun; Lokomotiv; Olympic MobiUz; Olympic Tashkent	Odil Ahmedov; Andijan FA; BuxDU; Andijan-2; Ishtixon; Kattakurgon; Lochin; Lokomotiv BFK; Navoiy FA; Namangan FA; Oqtepa; Qiziriq; Karakalpakstan FA; Sementchi; Syrdarya FA; Tashkent VFA; Khorezm FA; Zaamin

== Qualifying Stage ==
April 1, 2025 1st Qualifying Match	Andijon FA	3–0	Kattaqoʻrgʻon	Tashkent
14:00 (UTC+5)	Sardor Fozilov 23'* Muhammadali Abdusalomov 74'; Patiddin Zuxriddinov 81'	Report		Stadium: Odil Junior Stadium; Attendance: 46; Referee: Diyorbek Temirbekov

April 1, 2025 2nd Qualifying Match	Namangan FA	3–1	Ahmedov	Tashkent
16:30 (UTC+5)	Odiljon Abdumutaliyev 56' Elbek Yoʻlchiyev 58' Farruh Abdurahmonov 90+3'	Report	Yahyobek Nasrulloyev 90'	Stadium: Odil Junior Stadium; Attendance: 114; Referee: Rinat Serazitdinov

April 2, 2025 3rd Qualifying Match	Qoraqalpogʻiston FA	1–1 (2–3 p)	Navoiy FA	Tashkent
14:00 (UTC+5)	Amangeldiyev 90+3'	Report	Odilov 70'	Stadium: Odil Junior Stadium; Attendance: 112; Referee: Muzaffar Yoqubov

April 2, 2025 4th Qualifying Match	Lokomotiv BFK	0–0 (1–4 p)	Sirdaryo FA	Tashkent
16:30 (UTC+5)		Report		Stadium: Odil Junior Stadium; Attendance: 61; Referee: Dias Galeyev

April 3, 2025 5th Qualifying Match	Qiziriq	1–1 (4–5 p)	Ishtixon	Tashkent
14:00 (UTC+5)	Shamsiddinov 90+5'	[ Report]	Sagdullayev 45+1'	Stadium: Odil Junior Stadium; Attendance: 107; Referee: Azizbek Jumanov

April 3, 2025 5th Qualifying Match	TerDU	1–1 (4–5 p)	Ishtixon	Tashkent
14:00 (UTC+5)	Shamsiddinov 90+5'	[sara Report]	Sagdullayev 45+1'	Stadium: Odil Junior Stadium; Attendance: 107; Referee: Azizbek Jumanov

April 3, 2025 6th Qualifying Match	Bukhara FA	0–4	Oqtepa	Tashkent
16:30 (UTC+5)		[ Report]	Mamatov 30'; Xabibullayev 36' Ismoilov 40' Ummatov 61'	Stadium: Odil Junior Stadium; Attendance: 170; Referee: Nurbek Sheraliyev

April 4, 2025 7th Qualifying Match	Toshkent VFA	1–3	Xorazm FA	Tashkent
14:30 (UTC+5)	Abdullajonov 61'	Report	Koʻklamov 75', 81'; Komilov 50'	Stadium: Odil Junior Stadium; Attendance: 0 Referee: Sardor Mirodilov

April 4, 2025 8th Qualifying Match	Doʻstlik	2–2	Lochin	Tashkent
(UTC+5)	Karimov 10'; Sulaymonov 40'		Tursunpoʻlatov 59'; Abduvaitov 90+4'	Stadium: Odil Junior Stadium; Referee: Alisher Rahimqulov

== Group stage ==
=== Group A ===
Pos	Team	Pld	W	D	L	GF	GA	GD	Pts	Qualification
1	Sogdiana	3	3	0	0	11	0	+11	9	Knockout Stage qualification
2	Aral	3	2	0	1	5	3	+2	6	Knockout Stage qualification
3	Xorazm FA	3	0	1	2	2	8	−6	1	
4	Sementchi	3	0	1	2	2	9	−7	1	

Source: UzPFL
Rules for classification: Group Stage Tiebreakers

April 16, 2025 Round 1	Aral	0—3	Sogdiana	Nukus
16:30 (UTC+5)		[ Report]	Rashidov 27'; Erkinov 84'; Mavlonqulov 90+5'	Stadium: NOPSTTM; Attendance: 711; Referee: Turabek Suyunov

April 16, 2025 Round 1	Sementchi	2—2	Khorezm FA	Quvasoy
10:00 (UTC+5)	Umirzoqov 90+1' (pen.); Jalolov 90+5'	[ Report]	Erkayev 10'; Boyjonov 58'	Stadium: Sementchi Stadium; Attendance: 152; Referee: Umidjon Rahimjonov

April 29, 2025 Round 2	Sogdiana	4—0	Sementchi	Jizzakh
19:00 (UTC+5)	Rashidov 5'; Erkinov 36'; Hoshimov 51', 56'	[ Report]		Stadium: Sogdiana Stadium; Attendance: 854; Referee: Alisher To‘xtasinov

April 29, 2025 Round 2	Khorezm FA	0—2	Aral	Urgench
17:30 (UTC+5)		[ Report]	Abdulxaqov 30'; Daryabayev 58'	Stadium: Khorezm SM; Attendance: 350; Referee: Roman Irgashev

May 20, 2025 Round 3	Sogdiana	4—0	Khorezm FA	Jizzakh
(UTC+5)	Rashidov 11'; Erkinov 21', 41'; Sultonov 61'	[ Report]		Stadium: Sogdiana Stadium

May 20, 2025 Round 3	Aral	0—0	Sementchi	Nukus
(UTC+5)		N.O.		Stadium: NOPSTTM

=== Group B ===
Pos	Team	Pld	W	D	L	GF	GA	GD	Pts	Qualification
1	Dinamo	3	2	1	0	5	2	+3	7	Knockout Stage qualification
2	Lochin	3	2	0	1	6	5	+1	6	Knockout Stage qualification
3	Surxon	3	1	0	2	4	6	−2	3	
4	Andijan	3	0	1	2	4	6	−2	1	

Source: UzPFL
Rules for classification: Group Stage Tiebreakers

April 16, 2025 Round 1	Andijan	2—3	Surkhan	Andijan
(UTC+5)	Uskoković 27'; Temirov 87'	[ Report]	Kolesnichenko 11' (pen.); Abdurahmonov 16'; Tursunov 89'	Stadium: Bobur Stadium; Attendance: 8818; Referee: Firdavs Norsafarov

April 16, 2025 Round 1	Dinamo	3—1	Lochin	Samarkand
19:15 (UTC+5)	Qodirqulov 42', 44'; Mirahmadov 86'	[ Report]	Toshkentboyev 73'	Stadium: Dinamo Stadium; Attendance: 938; Referee: Dias Galeev

April 29, 2025 Round 2	Lochin	2—1	Andijan	Beshkent
17:00 (UTC+5)	Mahamadaminov 85'; Toshkenboyev 90+2'	[ Report]	Mehanović 86' (pen.)	Stadium: Beshkent Central Stadium; Attendance: 894; Referee: Zokir Sapoyev

April 29, 2025 Round 2	Surkhan	0—1	Dinamo	Termez
19:15 (UTC+5)		[ Report]	Khojimirzayev 21'	Stadium: Surkhan Stadium; Attendance: 3378; Referee: Akobir Shukurullayev

May 13, 2025 Round 3	Andijan	1—1	Dinamo	Andijan
(UTC+5)	Abdumannopov 9' (pen.)	[ Report]	Abdirasulov 45+2'	Stadium: Bobur Stadium; Attendance: 4216

May 13, 2025 Round 3	Surkhan	1—3	Lochin	Termez
(UTC+5)	Abdusalomov 10'	[ Report]	Polvonov 32', 36'; Tursunpo‘latov 90+6'	Stadium: Surkhan Stadium; Referee: Maruf Tilloyev

=== Group D ===
Pos	Team	Pld	W	D	L	GF	GA	GD	Pts	Qualification
1	Shurtan	3	2	1	0	9	0	+9	7	Knockout Stage qualification
2	Mashal	3	2	1	0	3	1	+2	7	Knockout Stage qualification
3	Ishtixon	3	1	0	2	2	7	−5	3	
4	Olympic	3	0	0	3	1	7	−6	0	

Source: UzPFL
Rules for classification: Group Stage Tiebreakers

April 15, 2025 Round 1	Navbahor	1—1	Neftchi	Namangan
20:15 (UTC+5)	Guedes 49'	[ Report]	Marushich 90+6'	Stadium: Navbahor Stadium; Referee: Ilgiz Tantashev

April 15, 2025 Round 1	FarDU	3—1	Oqtepa	Fergana
(UTC+5)	Zokirov 1', 32'; Abduvaliyev 54'	[ Report]	Baxtiyorov 71'	Stadium: Istiqlol Stadium; Referee: Akmal Rahimov

April 30, 2025 Round 2	Oqtepa	0—1	Navbahor	Tashkent
17:00 (UTC+5)		[ Report]	Guedes 61'	Stadium: Oqtepa Stadium; Attendance: 227; Referee: Sardor Mirodilov

April 30, 2025 Round 2	Shurtan	3—0	Olimpik	Guzor
17:00 (UTC+5)	Mamasidiqov 13'; Nuriddinov 69'; Qoziyev 90+3'	[ Report]		Stadium: Guzor Stadium; Attendance: 989; Referee: Jahongir Noraliyev

May 14, 2025 Round 3	Mashal	2—1	Olimpik	Muborak District
17:00 (UTC+5)	Rahmatullayev 63', 69'	[ Report]	Yelichich 33'	Stadium: Bahrom Vafoev Stadium; Referee: Umidjon Nutfulloyev

May 14, 2025 Round 3	Shurtan	6—0	Ishtikhon	Guzor District
17:00 (UTC+5)	Pirmuhamedov 41'; Qodirov 45+2'; Qoziyev 61' (pen.); Tursunqulov 74'; Abdurazzoqov 80', 90+3'	[ Report]		Stadium: Guzor Stadium

=== Group E ===
Pos	Team	Pld	W	D	L	GF	GA	GD	Pts	Qualification
1	Neftchi	3	2	1	0	8	2	+6	7	Knockout Stage qualification
2	Navbahor	3	2	1	0	5	2	+3	7	Knockout Stage qualification
3	FarDU	3	1	0	2	5	7	−2	3	
4	Oqtepa	3	0	0	3	1	8	−7	0	

Source: UzPFL
Rules for classification: Group Stage Tiebreakers

April 15, 2025 Round 1	Navbahor	1—1	Neftchi	Namangan
20:15 (UTC+5)	Guedes 49'	[ Report]	Marushich 90+6'	Stadium: Navbahor Stadium; Referee: Ilgiz Tantashev

April 15, 2025 Round 1	FarDU	3—1	Oqtepa	Fergana
(UTC+5)	Zokirov 1', 32'; Abduvaliyev 54'	[ Report]	Baxtiyorov 71'	Stadium: Istiqlol Stadium; Referee: Akmal Rahimov

April 30, 2025 Round 2	Oqtepa	0—1	Navbahor	Tashkent
17:00 (UTC+5)		[ Report]	Guedes 61'	Stadium: Oqtepa Stadium; Attendance: 227; Referee: Sardor Mirodilov

April 30, 2025 Round 2	Neftchi	3—1	FarDU	Fergana
19:15 (UTC+5)	Aliboyev 26'; Ismoilov 34'; Toshmirzayev 75'	[ Report]	Rasulov 69'	Stadium: Istiqlol Stadium; Attendance: 4816; Referee: Umidjon Rahimjonov

May 14, 2025 Round 3	Navbahor	3—1	FarDU	Namangan
19:15 (UTC+5)	O‘rinboyev 65'; Jiyanov 79'; Odilov 84'	[ Report]	Qodirov 90+3'	Stadium: Navbahor Stadium

May 14, 2025 Round 3	Neftchi	4—0	Oqtepa	Fergana
19:15 (UTC+5)	Tabatadze 27'; Gadoyev 48'; G‘ofurov 56'; G‘iyosov 82'	[ Report]		Stadium: Istiqlol Stadium

=== Group F ===
Pos	Team	Pld	W	D	L	GF	GA	GD	Pts	Qualification
1	Kokand 1912	3	2	1	0	10	2	+8	7	Knockout Stage qualification
2	Qizilqum	3	2	0	1	8	2	+6	6	Knockout Stage qualification
3	Zomin	3	1	1	1	6	7	−1	4	
4	Andijon FA	3	0	0	3	3	16	−13	0	

Source: UzPFL
Rules for classification: Group Stage Tiebreakers

April 8, 2025 Round 1	Kokand 1912	1—1	Zaamin	Kokand
17:00 (UTC+5)	Husanov 16'	[ Report]	Mo‘minov 73'	Stadium: Markaziy Stadium; Attendance: 1532; Referee: Akmal Rakhimov

April 8, 2025 Round 1	Qizilqum	4—0	Andijon FA	Samarkand
18:00 (UTC+5)	Anvarov 25'; Rahmatullayev 51'; Jumanqoʻziyev 66'; Komilov 90+2'	[ Report]		Stadium: Dinamo Stadium; Attendance: 102; Referee: Dias Galeyev

April 22, 2025 Round 2	Andijon FA	0—7	Kokand 1912	Andijan
(UTC+5)		[ Report]	Beshimov 48', 59', 90+2'; Husanov 72', 73'; Joʻraboyev 76'; Kondratyuk 80'	Stadium: Andijon FA Stadium; Attendance: 118; Referee: Umidjon Rahimjonov

April 22, 2025 Round 2	Zamin	0—3	Qizilqum	Tashkent
(UTC+5)		[ Report]	Mašović 71'; Jumanqoʻziyev 89'; Papariga 90+4'	Stadium: Odil Ahmedov Academy Stadium; Attendance: 136; Referee: Toʻrabek Suyunov

May 21, 2025 Round 3	Kokand 1912	2—1	Qizilqum	Kokand
(UTC+5)	Gʻofurov 32' (pen.); Beshimov 85'	[ Report]	Turopov 25'	Stadium: Markaziy Stadium; Attendance: 1254

May 21, 2025 Round 3	Zamin	5—3	Andijon FA	Tashkent
(UTC+5)	Turgʻunov 7'; Proxorov 27'; Oxtayev 31', 58'; Tojiyev 53'	[ Report]	Xudayberdiyev 39' (o.g.); Hurxonov 70'; Zuhriddinov 90+3'	Stadium: Odil Ahmedov Academy Stadium; Attendance: 76

=== Group G ===
Pos	Team	Pld	W	D	L	GF	GA	GD	Pts	Qualification
1	Bukhara	3	2	0	1	7	1	+6	6 (Note: Points gathered in head-to-head matches: Bukhara 3, Bunyodkor 3, Lokomotiv 3. Goal difference in head-to-head matches: Bukhara +1, Bunyodkor 0, Lokomotiv -1.)	Knockout Stage qualification
2	Bunyodkor	3	2	0	1	4	2	+2	6	Knockout Stage qualification
3	Lokomotiv	3	2	0	1	7	3	+4	6	
4	Namangan FA	3	0	0	3	2	14	−12	0	

Source: UzPFL
Rules for classification: Group Stage Tiebreakers
Notes:

April 8, 2025 Round 1	Lokomotiv	6—1	Namangan FA	Tashkent
(UTC+5)	Arveladze 36'; Hakimov 41'; Shulaia 48'; Shodiboyev 57'; Zoirov 75'; Turopov 87'	[ Report]	Abdumutalliyev 53'	Stadium: Doʻstlik; Attendance: 215; Referee: Rinat Serazitdinov

April 8, 2025 Round 1	Bunyodkor	1—0	Bukhara	Tashkent
19:15 (UTC+5)	Kaçorri 90+4'	[ Report]		Stadium: Bunyodkor Stadium; Attendance: 564; Referee: Xushnud Suyunboyev

April 23, 2025 Round 2	Bukhara	2—0	Lokomotiv	Bukhara
16:30 (UTC+5)	Ikić 22'; Ro‘ziyev 56'	[ Report]		Stadium: Bukhara FA Stadium; Attendance: 1516; Referee: Ravshan Abduvohidov

April 23, 2025 Round 2	Namangan FA	1—3	Bunyodkor	Namangan
16:30 (UTC+5)	Umaraliyev 25'	[ Report]	Muhammadov 28'; Abdusalomov 85', 90+1'	Stadium: Yosh Kuch Stadium; Attendance: 260; Referee: Xushnud Suyunboyev

May 21, 2025 Round 3	Bukhara	5—0	Namangan FA	Bukhara
(UTC+5)	Joʻrayev 8', 48'; Tupliyev 58'; Norxonov 65'; Ikić 90'	[ Report]		Stadium: Bukhara FA Stadium; Attendance: 574

May 21, 2025 Round 3	Bunyodkor	0—1	Lokomotiv	Tashkent
(UTC+5)		[ Report]	Yoʻldoshev 71'	Stadium: Bunyodkor Stadium; Attendance: 898

=== Group H ===
Pos	Team	Pld	W	D	L	GF	GA	GD	Pts	Qualification
1	Pakhtakor	3	3	0	0	17	4	+13	9	Knockout Stage qualification
2	OKMK	3	2	0	1	16	5	+11	6	Knockout Stage qualification
3	Nasaf	3	1	0	2	10	10	0	3	
4	Navoi FA	3	0	0	3	2	26	−24	0	

Source: UzPFL
Rules for classification: Group Stage Tiebreakers

April 9, 2025 Round 1	Nasaf	5—1	Navoiy FA	Qarshi
18:00 (UTC+5)	Asomiddinov 2'; Nurulloyev 52'; Usmonov 55'; Ćeran 77'; Mozgovoy 90+3'	[ Report]	Raufov 87'	Stadium: Central Stadium; Attendance: 3,854; Referee: Jahongir Noraliyev

April 9, 2025 Round 1	Pakhtakor	2—1	AGMK	Tashkent
19:30 (UTC+5)	Joʻraqoʻziyev 10'; Sergeyev 75'	[ Report]	Abdurazzoqov 29'	Stadium: JAR; Attendance: 1,865; Referee: Nikita Mustafin

April 23, 2025 Round 2	Navoiy FA	0—9	Pakhtakor	Navoiy
17:00 (UTC+5)		[ Report]	Resan 19'; Riascos 28'; Joʻraqoʻziyev 41'; Oʻrinboyev 50', 72'; Abdumajidov 52'; Xolmatov 77'; Saidnurullayev 88', 90+1'	Stadium: Yoshlik Stadium; Attendance: 898; Referee: Feruzbek Hidoyatov

April 23, 2025 Round 2	AGMK	3—2	Nasaf	Olmaliq
20:15 (UTC+5)	Abdurahmonov 48', 86'; Sánchez 77'	[ Report]	Ćeran 9', 36'	Stadium: AGMK Stadium; Attendance: 4,340; Referee: Akmal Rahimov

May 13, 2025 Round 3	Pakhtakor	6—3	Nasaf	Tashkent
(UTC+5)	Ibrohimov 3' (pen.); Sergeyev 14', 61', 85'; Abdullayev 36'; Riascos 81'	[ Report]	Čolović 28'; Mozgovoy 32'; Norchayev 54'	Stadium: Pakhtakor Stadium; Attendance: 360

May 13, 2025 Round 3	AGMK	12—1	Navoiy FA	Olmaliq
(UTC+5)	Sánchez 1', 33', 58'; Xolmurodov 19'; Muqimjonov 50'; Abdurazzoqov 21', 42'; Gʻiyosov 64', 77'; Sobirjonov 55', 78'; Raufov 42' (o.g.)	[ Report]	1422: Murodilloyev 60'	Stadium: AGMK Stadium

=== Group I ===
Pos	Team	Pld	W	D	L	GF	GA	GD	Pts	Qualification
1	Xorazm	3	3	0	0	11	3	+8	9	Knockout Stage qualification
2	Olympic Mobiuz	3	2	0	1	7	5	+2	6	Knockout Stage qualification
3	Jaykhun	3	1	0	2	4	7	−3	3	
4	Sirdaryo FA	3	0	0	3	0	7	−7	0	

Source: UzPFL
Rules for classification: Group Stage Tiebreakers

April 9, 2025 Round 1	Jaykhun	2–0	Sirdaryo FA	Nukus
(UTC+5)	Karilov 45+3'; Daryabayev 69'	[ Report]		Stadium: NOPSTTM; Attendance: 336; Referee: Zokir Sapoyev

April 9, 2025 Round 1	Olimpik MobiUz	2–4	Xorazm	Tashkent
(UTC+5)	Komilov 15'; Fomin 63'	[ Report]	Abdukhamidov 72'; Joʻrayev 87' (pen.); Ismoilov 90+5'; Samiev 90+6'	Stadium: Doʻstlik; Attendance: 116; Referee: Rustam Choriyev

April 22, 2025 Round 2	Sirdaryo FA	0–1	Olimpik MobiUz	Yangiyer
16:30 (UTC+5)		[ Report]	Tojiboyev 45+2'	Stadium: Yangiyer Stadium; Attendance: 82; Referee: Nurbek Sheraliyev

April 22, 2025 Round 2	Xorazm	3–1	Jaykhun	Tashkent
18:00 (UTC+5)	Yejov 44'; Abdullajonov 57'; Bobojonov 90+2'	[ Report]	Daryabayev 90+1'	Stadium: Doʻstlik; Attendance: 127; Referee: Ma'murjon Ilhomov

May 21, 2025 Round 3	Olimpik MobiUz	4–1	Jaykhun	Tashkent
(UTC+5)	Ibraimov 5'; Raimov 71', 75'; Rizoqulov 82' (pen.)	[ Report]	Kuanishbayev 85'	Stadium: Doʻstlik; Attendance: 231

May 21, 2025 Round 3	Xorazm	4–0	Sirdaryo FA	Olmaliq
(UTC+5)	Bobojonov 13'; Yejov 54', 66'; Ahrorov 61'	[ Report]		Stadium: OKMK Stadium; Attendance: 110

== Knockout stage ==
=== Round of 16 ===
June 8, 2025
20:00 (UTC+5)
Round of 16

Dinamo	5—0	Lochin
Mirahmadov 3', 24', 30'; Abdurahmonov 62', 67'	[ Report]

Dinamo Stadium, Samarkand
Attendance: 3,854
Referee: Toʻrabek Suyunov

June 18, 2025
(UTC+5)
Round of 16

Kokand 1912	1—1 (a.e.t.)	Bunyodkor
Husanov 45+3'	[ Report]	Abdusalomov
Penalties
Gʻofurov (penalty scored); Joʻraboyev (penalty missed); Salimov (penalty scored); Qosimov (penalty scored); Beshimov (penalty scored); Abdurahimov (penalty missed)	4–5	(penalty scored) Kaçorri; (penalty missed) Šroler; (penalty scored) Ahmadjonov; (penalty scored) Yoʻldoshev; (penalty scored) Toʻraqulov; (penalty scored) Olimjonov

Qoʻqon Stadium, Kokand
Attendance: 1,901
Referee: Xushnud Suyunboyev

June 18, 2025
(UTC+5)
Round of 16

Shurtan	4—1	Aral
Mamasidiqov 27' (pen.); Hasanov 41'; Narzullayev 61'; Saidxonov 90+4'	[ Report]	Kuanishbayev 87'

Gʻuzor Stadium, Gʻuzor
Attendance: 1,211
Referee: Nikita Mustafin

June 24, 2025
(UTC+5)
Round of 16

Neftchi	0—1	Mashʼal
	[ Report]	Abduraimov 6'

Istiqlol Stadium, Fergana
Attendance: 2,506
Referee: Ahrol Risqullayev

June 24, 2025
(UTC+5)
Round of 16

Sogdiana	4—1	Qizilqum
Mavlonqulov 1'; Joʻraboyev 18'; Andreyev 50'; Jumatov (red card) 68'; Mustafoqulov 90+2'	[ Report]	Usmonov 8'

Sogdiana Stadium, Jizzakh
Attendance: 840
Referee: Doston Rahmonov

June 25, 2025
19:30 (UTC+5)
Round of 16

Bukhara	3—1	OKMK
Ilyosov 31' (o.g.); Norxonov 34'; Qayumov 45+1'		Tomašević 25' (o.g.)

OKMK Stadium, Olmaliq
Referee: Akmal Rahimov

July 2, 2025
20:00 (UTC+5)
Round of 16

Pakhtakor	2—1	Olimpik MobiUz
Brayan Riascos 41', 81'		Bunyodbek Rahimov 66'

Jar Stadium, Tashkent
Referee: Nikita Mustafin

July 2, 2025
20:00 (UTC+5)
Round of 16

Khorezm	1—3	Navbahor
Shahrom Samiev 83'		Higor Gabriel 49'; Abbos Gʻulomov 80', 87'

Sogdiana, Jizzakh
Referee: Ravshan Abduvakhidov

=== Quarter finals ===
August 25, 2025
19:00 (UTC+5)
1/4 final

Sogdiana	4—0	Navbahor
Hebaj 5', 56'; Qahramonov 84', 90+3'	Report

Soʻgʻdiyona, Jizzakh
Referee: Akhrol Riskullaev

August 26, 2025
20.30 (UTC+5)
1/4 final

Paxtakor	3—1	Mashʼal
Flamarion 10', 45': Sergeyev 45+4'		Murtozoyev 84' (pen.)

Jar, Tashkent

August 27, 2025
(UTC+5)
1/4 final

Dinamo	3—0	Shurtan
Abdurahmonov 19': Toshqoʻziyev 39' (o.g.); Oʻrozov 77'

Dinamo, Samarqand

August 27, 2025
(UTC+5)
1/4 final

Bunyodkor	2—4	Buxoro
Normurodov 12'; Krivokapić 55'		Amonov 6': Tabatadze 37', 68'; Ikić 87'

Jar stadioni, Tashkent

== Semi-finals ==
September 25, 2025
(UTC+5)
Semi-finals

Buxoro FK	3 – 2 (a.e.t.)	Sogdiana
	Report

Buxoro Sport Majmuasi, Buxoro
Attendance: 6826
Referee: Axrol Riskullayev

September 25, 2025
(UTC+5)
Semi-finals

Pakhtakor	0 – 0 (a.e.t.)	Dinamo
	Report
Penalties
	4 - 2

JAR, Tashkent
Referee: Doston Rahmonov

== Final ==
29 October 2025	Pakhtakor	1–0	Bukhara	Andijan
18:30 UZT (UTC+5)	Erkinov 63'; Khamraliev (yellow card) 73'; Resan (yellow card) 79'; Ibrokhimov (yellow card) 90+3'; Jhonatan (yellow card) 90+18'	[ Report]	Čirjak (yellow card) 52'	Stadium: Bobur Arena; Attendance: 6,814; Referee: Nayim Qosimov

== Top scorers ==
As of November 25, 2025

5 goals

- (Uzbekistan) Igor Sergeev (Paxtakor)

4 goals

- (Croatia) Frane Ikić (Buxoro)
- (Uzbekistan) Mirjahon Mirakhmadov (Dinamo)
- (Spain) Rubén Sánchez (OKMK)
- (Colombia) Brayan Riascos (Paxtakor)
- (Uzbekistan) Shahzod Beshimov (Kokand 1912)
- (Uzbekistan) Javohir Husanov (Kokand 1912)
- (Uzbekistan) Sardorbek Erkinov (Soʻgʻdiyona)

3 goals

- (Uzbekistan) Nosirjon Abdusalomov (Bunyodkor)
- (Georgia (country)) Toma Tabatadze (Neftchi—1) – (Buxoro—2)
- (Uzbekistan) Firdavs Abdurahmonov (Dinamo)
- (Serbia) Dragan Ćeran (Nasaf)
- (Uzbekistan) Nodir Abdurazzoqov (OKMK)
- (Uzbekistan) Sahob Rashidov (Soʻgʻdiyona)
- (Uzbekistan) Danila Yejov (Xorazm)

2 goals

- (Uzbekistan) Patiddin Zuxriddinov (Andijon FA)
- (Uzbekistan) Anvarjon Joʻrayev (Buxoro)
- (Uzbekistan) Shoxruz Norxonov (Buxoro)
- (Uzbekistan) Sanjar Qodirqulov (Dinamo)
- (Uzbekistan) Sanjarbek Zokirov (FarDU)
- (Uzbekistan) Shuhrat Daryabayev (Jayxun)
- (Uzbekistan) Suhrobbek Toshkentboyev (Lochin)
- (Uzbekistan) Asliddin Tursunpoʻlatov (Lochin)
- (Uzbekistan) Zafar Polvonov (Lochin)
- (Uzbekistan) Odil Abdumutalliyev (Namangan FA)
- (Brazil) Guilherme Guedes (Navbahor)
- (Uzbekistan) Abbos Gʻulomov (Navbahor)
- (Uzbekistan) Akmal Mozgovoy (Nasaf)
- (Uzbekistan) Asadbek Sobirjonov (OKMK)
- (Uzbekistan) Khurshid Giyosov (OKMK)
- (Uzbekistan) Ali Abdurahmonov (OKMK)
- (Uzbekistan) Muhammadali Raimov (Olimpik MobiUz)
- (Uzbekistan) Otabek Joʻraqoʻziyev (Paxtakor)
- (Uzbekistan) Muhammadali Oʻrinboyev (Paxtakor)
- (Uzbekistan) Saidumarxon Saidnurullayev (Paxtakor)
- (Brazil) Flamarion (Paxtakor)
- (Uzbekistan) Fayzullobek Jumanqoʻziyev (Qizilqum)
- (Uzbekistan) Sardorbek Hoshimov (Soʻgʻdiyona)
- (Albania) Rubin Hebaj (Soʻgʻdiyona)
- (Uzbekistan) Javohir Qahramonov (Soʻgʻdiyona)
- (Uzbekistan) Samandarjon Mavlonqulov (Soʻgʻdiyona)
- (Uzbekistan) Murodbek Bobojonov (Xorazm)
- (Tajikistan) Shahrom Samiev (Xorazm)
- (Uzbekistan) Asadbek Koʻklamov (Xorazm FA)
- (Uzbekistan) Abduvohid Oxtayev (Zamin)
- (Uzbekistan) Sirojiddin Qoʻziyev (Shoʻrtan)
- (Uzbekistan) Mirkomil Abdurazzoqov (Shoʻrtan)
- (Uzbekistan) Temur Mamasidiqov (Shoʻrtan)

1 goal

- (Uzbekistan) Sardor Fozilov (Andijon FA)
- (Uzbekistan) Muhammadali Abdusalomov (Andijon FA)
- (Uzbekistan) Muhammadiyorbek Hurxonov (Andijon FA)
- (Montenegro) Luka Uskoković (Andijon)
- (Uzbekistan) Damir Temirov (Andijon)
- (Uzbekistan) Doniyor Abdumannopov (Andijon)
- (Bosnia and Herzegovina) Mirzad Mehanović (Andijon)
- (Uzbekistan) Izzatullo Abdulhaqov (Aral)
- (Uzbekistan) Mirzabek Daryabayev (Aral)
- (Uzbekistan) Rahmatulla Amangeldiyev (Aral akademiya)
- (Uzbekistan) Fahriddin Muhammadov (Bunyodkor)
- (Uzbekistan) Najmiddin Normurodov (Bunyodkor)
- (Montenegro) Matija Krivokapić (Bunyodkor)
- (Albania) Luis Kaçorri (Bunyodkor)
- (Uzbekistan) Javohir Roʻziyev (Buxoro)
- (Uzbekistan) Azizbek Amonov (Buxoro)
- (Uzbekistan) Nodirbek Ahmadjonov (Buxoro)
- (Bosnia and Herzegovina) Dominik Begić (Buxoro)
- (Uzbekistan) Bilol Tupliyev (Buxoro)
- (Uzbekistan) Asilbek Qayumov (Buxoro)
- (Uzbekistan) Akbar Abdirasulov (Dinamo)
- (Uzbekistan) Jahongir Oʻrozov (Dinamo)
- (Uzbekistan) Anvar Xojimirzayev (Dinamo)
- (Uzbekistan) Saidmurod Karimov (Doʻstlik)
- (Uzbekistan) Davronbek Sulaymonov (Doʻstlik)
- (Uzbekistan) Bahodir Abduvaliyev (FarDU)
- (Uzbekistan) Sherali Rasulov (FarDU)
- (Uzbekistan) Sherzod Qodirov (FarDU)
- (Uzbekistan) Sayyodbek Davronov (Ishtixon)
- (Uzbekistan) Gʻolibjon Sariboyev (Ishtixon)
- (Uzbekistan) Shamsiddin Sagdullayev (Ishtixon)
- (Uzbekistan) Umidjon Karilov (Jayxun)
- (Uzbekistan) Begis Kuanishbayev (Jayxun)
- (Georgia (country)) Levan Arveladze (Lokomotiv)
- (Uzbekistan) Jasur Hakimov (Lokomotiv)
- (Georgia (country)) Akaki Shulaia (Lokomotiv)
- (Uzbekistan) Shodiyor Shodiboyev (Lokomotiv)
- (Uzbekistan) Abdulloh Yoʻldoshev (Lokomotiv)
- (Uzbekistan) Muhriddin Zoirov (Lokomotiv)
- (Uzbekistan) Diyor Turopov (Lokomotiv)
- (Uzbekistan) Ogʻabek Mahamadaminov (Lochin)
- (Uzbekistan) Shakhzod Abduvaitov (Lochin)
- (Uzbekistan) Nodirxon Habibullayev (Mashʼal)
- (Uzbekistan) Sardor Abduraimov (Mashʼal)
- (Uzbekistan) Humoyun Murtozoyev (Mashʼal)
- (Uzbekistan) Firdavs Umaraliyev (Namangan FA)
- (Uzbekistan) Elbek Yoʻlchiyev (Namangan FA)
- (Uzbekistan) Farruh Abdurahmonov (Namangan FA)
- (Uzbekistan) Diyorbek Asomiddinov (Nasaf)
- (Uzbekistan) Suhrob Nurulloyev (Nasaf)
- (Uzbekistan) Davronbek Usmonov (Nasaf)
- (Serbia) Stefan Čolović (Nasaf)
- (Uzbekistan) Khusayin Norchaev (Nasaf)
- (Uzbekistan) Sherzod Raufov (Navoiy FA)
- (Uzbekistan) Muhammad Odilov (Navoiy FA)
- (Serbia) Zoran Marušić (Neftchi)
- (Uzbekistan) Ikrom Aliboyev (Neftchi)
- (Uzbekistan) Abror Ismoilov (Neftchi)
- (Uzbekistan) Bilolxon Toshmirzayev (Neftchi)
- (Uzbekistan) Shohrux Gadoyev (Neftchi)
- (Uzbekistan) Muhammadali Gʻiyosov (Neftchi)
- (Uzbekistan) Anvarjon Gʻofurov (Neftchi)
- (Uzbekistan) Zabihillo Oʻrinboyev (Navbahor)
- (Brazil) Higor Gabriel (Navbahor)
- (Uzbekistan) Ruslanbek Jiyanov (Navbahor)
- (Uzbekistan) Alisher Odilov (Navbahor)
- (Uzbekistan) Aziz Xolmurodov (OKMK)
- (Uzbekistan) Ahmadullo Muqimjonov (OKMK)
- (Uzbekistan) Azizxon Baxtiyorov (Oqtepa)
- (Uzbekistan) Shuhrat Mamatov (Oqtepa)
- (Uzbekistan) Muslimbek Khabibullaev (Oqtepa)
- (Uzbekistan) Sulton Ismoilov (Oqtepa)
- (Uzbekistan) Ismadiyor Ummatov (Oqtepa)
- (Uzbekistan) Diyorbek Tojiboyev (Olimpik MobiUz)
- (Uzbekistan) Bunyodbek Rahimov (Olimpik MobiUz)
- (Uzbekistan) Murodjon Komilov (Olimpik MobiUz)
- (Uzbekistan) Rustambek Fomin (Olimpik MobiUz)
- (Uzbekistan) Gʻiyosjon Rizoqulov (Olimpik MobiUz)
- (Uzbekistan) Nurlan Ibraimov (Olimpik MobiUz)
- (Iraq) Bashar Resan (Paxtakor)
- (Uzbekistan) Ibrohim Ibrohimov (Paxtakor)
- (Uzbekistan) Muhammadrasul Abdumajidov (Paxtakor)
- (Uzbekistan) Diyor Xolmatov (Paxtakor)
- (Serbia) Alen Mašović (Qizilqum)
- (Ukraine) Roman Papariga (Qizilqum)
- (Uzbekistan) Davron Anvarov (Qizilqum)
- (Uzbekistan) Murodali Usmonov (Qizilqum)
- (Uzbekistan) Diyor Rahmatullayev (Qizilqum)
- (Uzbekistan) Dilshod Komilov (Qizilqum)
- (Uzbekistan) Shahzod Turopov (Qizilqum)
- (Uzbekistan) Bekjon Joʻraboyev (Kokand 1912)
- (Ukraine) Yegor Kondratyuk (Kokand 1912)
- (Uzbekistan) Husniddin Gʻofurov (Kokand 1912)
- (Uzbekistan) Muhriddin Shamsiddinov (Qiziriq)
- (Russia) Kirill Kolesnichenko (Surxon)
- (Uzbekistan) Muhammadali Abdurahmonov (Surxon)
- (Uzbekistan) Jahongirbek Abdusalomov (Surxon)
- (Uzbekistan) Dostonbek Tursunov (Surxon)
- (Uzbekistan) Umid Sultonov (Soʻgʻdiyona)
- (Tajikistan) Zoir Joʻraboyev (Soʻgʻdiyona)
- (Uzbekistan) Stanislav Andreyev (Soʻgʻdiyona)
- (Uzbekistan) Jasurbek Jaloliddinov (Soʻgʻdiyona)
- (Serbia) Filip Ivanović (Soʻgʻdiyona)
- (Uzbekistan) Xondamir Mustafoqulov (Soʻgʻdiyona)
- (Uzbekistan) Dilshodbek Umirzoqov (Sementchi)
- (Uzbekistan) Shohruhbek Jalolov (Sementchi)
- (Uzbekistan) Akobir Abdullajonov (Toshkent VFA)
- (Uzbekistan) Rustam Abduhamidov (Xorazm)
- (Uzbekistan) Dilshod Joʻrayev (Xorazm)
- (Uzbekistan) Temur Ismoilov (Xorazm)
- (Uzbekistan) Sunnatulla Abdullajonov (Xorazm)
- (Uzbekistan) Azizjon Ahrorov (Xorazm)
- (Uzbekistan) Oʻtkirbek Komilov (Xorazm FA)
- (Uzbekistan) Jamshidbek Boyjonov (Xorazm FA)
- (Uzbekistan) Otabek Erkayev (Xorazm FA)
- (Uzbekistan) Alisher Moʻminov (Zamin)
- (Uzbekistan) Umidjon Turgʻunov (Zamin)
- (Uzbekistan) Sergey Proxorov (Zamin)
- (Uzbekistan) Baxtiyor Tojiyev (Zamin)
- (Uzbekistan) Shahboz Nuriddinov (Shoʻrtan)
- (Uzbekistan) Azizbek Pirmuhamedov (Shoʻrtan)
- (Uzbekistan) Gʻanisher Qodirov (Shoʻrtan)
- (Uzbekistan) Choriyor Tursunqulov (Shoʻrtan)
- (Uzbekistan) Nuriddin Hasanov (Shoʻrtan)
- (Uzbekistan) Doniyor Narzullayev (Shoʻrtan)
- (Uzbekistan) Asadbek Saidxonov (Shoʻrtan)

1 own goal

- (Uzbekistan) Sherzod Raufov (Navoiy FA) for AGMK
- (Uzbekistan) Akbar Xudayberdiyev (Zamin) for Andijon FA
- (Uzbekistan) Javohir Ilyosov (OKMK) for Buxoro
- (Croatia) Josip Tomašević (Buxoro) for AGMK
- (Uzbekistan) Abror Toshqoʻziyev (Shoʻrtan) for Dinamo
