= 2024 Uzbekistan Cup =

Tournament details
- Country: Uzbekistan
- Dates: March – October 2024
- Teams: 26

Final positions
- Champions: Andijon (1st title)
- Runners-up: Navbahor
- Third place: Pakhtakor
- Fourth place: Surkhon

Tournament statistics
- Matches played: 42
- Goals scored: 109 (2.6 per match)

2024 Uzbekistan Cup (in Uzbek: Футбол бўйича 2024-йилги Ўзбекистон Кубоги) was the 32nd season of the annually held Uzbekistan Cup tournament, organised by UzPFL in 2024. The winner of the Cup "Andijon" earned the right to participate in 2025–26 AFC Champions League Two.

Coca-Cola Bottlers Uzbekistan had been chosen as the tournament's main sponsor for the next two seasons.

== Teams ==
26 teams received a direct berth to the group stage of the 2024 Uzbekistan Cup. The remaining 6 berths were determined through a qualification round involving 12 teams.

Uzbekistan Super League; 14 clubs from 2024 Uzbekistan Super League	Uzbekistan Pro League; 8 clubs from 2024 Uzbekistan Pro League	Uzbekistan First League; 16 clubs from 2024 Uzbekistan First League
AGMK; Andijon; Bunyodkor; Bukhara; Metallurg Bekobod; Nasaf; Navbahor Namangan; Neftchi Fergana; Olympic Tashkent; Pakhtakor Tashkent; Qizilqum Zarafshan; Sogdiana Jizzakh; Surkhon Termez; Dinamo	Andijon-SGS; Aral; Bukhara; Kokand 1912; Mashʼal; Shoʻrtan Guzar; Olympic MobiUz; Khorezm Urgench	Jaykhun; Sementchi; Lokomotiv BFK; Jizzakh; Kumkurgan 1977; Qiziriq; Zomin; Chigʻatoy; FarDU; BukhDU; Andijon FA; Namangan FA; Syrdarya FA; Navoi FA; Aral Academy; Tashkent VFA

== Draw and format ==
In the qualifying stage, 12 teams of the Uzbekistan First League competed for a spot in the group stage of Uzbekistan Cup. The draw ceremony was held on March 21, 2024, on the Sport TV channel by the head of the licensing and international relations department of Uzbekistan Professional Football League Zokhirjon Akramkhanov.

== Qualifying Stage ==
The qualifying stage was held among 12 clubs consisting of semi-professional teams participating in the Uzbekistan First League and regional academy teams. The matches were single-legged and all were played in Tashkent on April 1, 2024. The draw to determine the matchups among the 12 teams was held on March 28.

April 1, 2024 Qualifying A	Andijon FA	0 – 1	Qiziriq	Tashkent
10:30 (UTC+5)			Xushboqov 29'	Stadium: UFA

April 1, 2024 Qualifying B	Namangan FA	1 – 0	BuxDU	Tashkent
13:00 (UTC+5)	Abdulxodiyev 7'			Stadium: UFA

April 1, 2024 Qualifying D	Zomin	7 – 0	Navoiy FA	Tashkent
15:30 (UTC+5)	Toirov 16', 46'; Abdumannonov 30', 38'; Mirqodirov 46'; Abdullayev 58'; Tojiyev 75'			Stadium: UFA

April 1, 2024 Qualifying E	FarDU	2 – 4	Chigʻatoy	Tashkent
10:30 (UTC+5)	Ayvazov 90+1' (pen.); Qurbonov 90+3'		Akmuratov 23'; Hushvaqtov 35'; Hoshimov 45+2'; Ikromov 45+2'	Stadium: Chigʻatoy

April 1, 2024 Qualifying F	Kumkurgan-1977	2 – 2 (6 – 7 p)	Aral akademiya	Toshkent
13:00 (UTC+5)	Bozorov 40'; Safarov 90+4'		Kalbayev 46'; Xidirboyev 53'	Stadium: Chigʻatoy stadioni

April 1, 2024 Qualifying G	Sirdaryo FA	3 – 2	Toshkent VFA	Tashkent
15:30 (UTC+5)	Abdumajidov 15', 50'; Abduhalilov 39' (pen.)		Daminov 7' (pen.); Jumatayev 27'	Stadium: Chigʻatoy

== Group stage ==
=== Group A ===
Pos	Team	Pld	W	D	L	GF	GA	GD	Pts	Qualification
1	Bunyodkor	3	1	2	0	8	1	+7	5	Round of 16
2	Qiziriq	3	1	2	0	4	3	+1	5	Round of 16
3	Shurtan	3	1	1	1	2	2	0	4	
4	Jaykhun	3	0	1	2	3	11	−8	1	

Updated to match(es) played on March 12, 2024. Source: PFL

April 14, 2024 1	Bunyodkor	0 – 0	Shurtan	Tashkent
(UTC+5)		Report		Stadium: Bunyodkor; Attendance: 872; Referee: Sardor Ismatullayev

April 14, 2024 1	Jaykhun	2 – 2	Qiziriq	Nukus
(UTC+5)	Primbetov 37', 85' (pen.)	Report	Xushboqov 56', 58'	Stadium: QRFA; Attendance: 231; Referee: Nayim Qosimov

April 21, 2024 2	Qiziriq	1 – 1	Bunyodkor	Tashkent
(UTC+5)		Report		Stadium: Bunyodkor; Referee: Xushnud Suyunboyev

April 21, 2024 2	Shurtan	2 – 1	Jaykhun	Gʻuzor
(UTC+5)		Report		Stadium: Gʻuzor; Referee: Rustam Choriyev

April 28, 2024 3	Bunyodkor	7 – 0	Jaykhun	Toshkent
(UTC+5)	Ismonaliyev 4', 42'; Jović 9'; Abduxoliqov 56'; Saidov 67'; Norqobilov 71' (a.g); Toʻlqinbekov 80'			Stadium: Bunyodkor stadioni

April 28, 2024 3	Shurtan	0 – 1	Qiziriq	Gʻuzor
(UTC+5)			Normurodov 28'	Stadium: Gʻuzor

=== Group B ===
Pos	Team	Pld	W	D	L	GF	GA	GD	Pts	Qualification
1	Aral	3	3	0	0	14	4	+10	9	Round of 16
2	Xorazm	3	2	0	1	7	4	+3	6	Round of 16
3	Sementchi	3	1	0	2	8	14	−6	3	
4	Namangan FA	3	0	0	3	5	12	−7	0	

Updated to match(es) played on March 21, 2024. Source: PFL

April 15, 2024 1	Xorazm	0 – 2	Aral	Urganch
(UTC+5)		Report	Umirbekov 23'; Kuanishbayev 50'	Stadium: Xorazm; Attendance: 3411; Referee: Sultonmurod Abdurahmonov

April 15, 2024 1	Sementchi	5 – 2	Namangan FA	Quvasoy
(UTC+5)	Rasulov 16'; Xayrullayev 47'; Umurzaqov 73' (pen.); Oʻrinboyev 77'; Neʼmatov 81'	Report	Tursunboyev 32'; Abdurahmonov 57'	Stadium: Sementchi; Attendance: 185; Referee: Xushnud Suyunboyev

April 22, 2024 2	Namangan FA	1 – 4	Xorazm	Namangan
(UTC+5)	Tursunboyev 76'	Report	Nurmatov 2', 40'; Ibrohimov 36'; Diamoutene	Stadium: Yosh Kuch stadioni Attendance: 351; Referee: Farruh Yansupov

April 23, 2024 2	Aral	9 – 2	Sementchi	Nukus
(UTC+5)	Qutiboyev 1', 10'; Abdulhaqov 6', 43'; Ziyovuddinov 39' (pen.); Qutiboyev 45+1'; Musayev 75'; Umirbekov 82'; Sagdullayev 89'	Report	Qosimov 5', 18' (pen.)	Stadium: QRFM stadioni Referee: Nayim Qosimov

April 29, 2024 3	Xorazm	3 – 1	Sementchi	Urganch
(UTC+5)	Farhodov 11', 23'; Diamoutene 65'		Qosimov 57'	Stadium: Xorazm

April 29, 2024 3	Aral	3 – 2	Namangan FA	Nukus
(UTC+5)	Kalmurzayev 27'; Sheripov 38'; Umirbekov 72'		Zokirjonov 49'; Zokirjonov 89'

=== Group D ===
Pos	Team	Pld	W	D	L	GF	GA	GD	Pts	Qualification
1	Olimpik MobiUZ	3	2	1	0	5	3	+2	7	Round of 16
2	Qizilqum	3	2	0	1	5	4	+1	6	Round of 16
3	Lokomotiv	3	1	1	1	3	3	0	4	
4	Zomin	3	0	0	3	2	5	−3	0	

Updated to match(es) played on April 21, 2024. Source: PFL

April 12, 2024 1	Surxon	0 – 0	Olimpik	Toshkent
(UTC+5)		Report		Stadium: Paxtakor; Attendance: 213; Referee: Olim Toʻychiboyev

April 12, 2024 1	Lokomotiv	1 – 0	Zomin	Toshkent
(UTC+5)	Krajišnik 14' (pen.)	Report		Stadium: Lokomotiv; Attendance: 86; Referee: Ibrohim Ismoilov

April 22, 2024 2	Zomin	2 – 3	Qizilqum	Zaamin
(UTC+5)	Tojiyev 57'; Mirqodirov 90+2'	Report	Kukhianidze 42'; Tarasov 74'; Shulaia 90'	Stadium: Zaamin; Attendance: 745; Referee: Toʻrabek Suyunov

April 29, 2024 2	Olimpik MobiUZ	2 – 2	Lokomotiv	Toshkent
(UTC+5)	Adhamov 77'; Reimov 80'	Report	Abdullayev 50'; Rizoqulov 70' (a.v)	Stadium: Dustlik; Attendance: 127; Referee: Gʻayrat Joʻrayev

April 29, 2024 3	Lokomotiv	0 – 1	Qizilqum	Tashkent
(UTC+5)		Report	Jumanqoʻziyev 32'	Stadium: Lokomotiv; Attendance: 481; Referee: Rahimbek Karimov

April 29, 2024 3	Olimpik MobiUZ	1 – 0	Zomin	Tashkent
(UTC+5)	Zohidov 27'	Report		Stadium: Dustlik; Attendance: 160; Referee: Farruh Yansupov

=== Group E ===
Pos	Team	Pld	W	D	L	GF	GA	GD	Pts	Qualification
1	Olimpik	3	2	1	0	12	1	+11	7	Round of 16
2	Surxon	3	2	1	0	8	1	+7	7	Round of 16
3	Lokomotiv BFK	3	1	0	2	1	10	−9	3	
4	Chigʻatoy	3	0	0	3	2	11	−9	0	

Updated to match(es) played on March 21, 2024. Source: PFL

April 13, 2024 1	Surxon	0 – 0	Olimpik	Tashkent
(UTC+5)		Report		Stadium: Paxtakor; Attendance: 213; Referee: Olim Toʻychiboyev

April 13, 2024 1	FC Lokomotiv BFK	1 – 0	Chigʻatoy	Tashkent
(UTC+5)	Abdurashidov 14'	Report		Stadium: TFA stadium Attendance: 67; Referee: Akmal Rahimov

April 20, 2024 2	Chigʻatoy	1 – 2	Surxon	Tashkent Region
(UTC+5)	Abdurashidov 17'	Report	Abdurahmonov 41'; Mahmudov 47'	Stadium: OKMK; Referee: Olim Toʻychiboyev

April 20, 2024 2	Olimpik	4 – 0	FC Lokomotiv BFK	Tashkent
(UTC+5)	Islamov 21'; Bozorov 25'; Joʻraboyev 69'; Maʼrufjonov 83'	Report		Stadium: JAR; Referee: Abdurashid Xudoyberganov

April 28, 2024 3	Surxon	8 – 1	FC Lokomotiv BFK	Tashkent
(UTC+5)	Qodirov 6', 23', 47'; Joʻraboyev 49', 57'; Ibrohimov 62'; Bozorov 67'; Islamov 90+3'		Xudoyberdiyev 90'

April 28, 2024 3	Olimpik	6 – 0	Chigʻatoy	Tashkent
(UTC+5)	Tursunov 20'; Absusalomov 53', 60'; Nimeli 84'; Jumayev 85'; Abduhamidov 90'

=== Group F ===
Pos	Team	Pld	W	D	L	GF	GA	GD	Pts	Qualification
1	Bukhara	3	1	2	0	9	3	+6	5	Round of 16
2	Mashʼal	3	2	1	0	9	0	+9	7	Round of 16
3	AGMK	3	1	1	1	18	3	+15	4	
4	Aral akademiya	3	0	0	3	1	31	−30	0	

Updated to match(es) played on March 21, 2024. Source: PFL

April 15, 2024 1	AGMK	0 – 1	Mashʼal	Olmaliq
(UTC+5)		Report	Abdualimov 78'	Stadium: OKMK; Attendance: 522; Referee: Rustam Choriyev

April 15, 2024 1	Buxoro	7 – 1	Aral akademiya	Toshkent
(UTC+5)	Ergashboyev 13', 40'; Ibragimov 23' (a.g); Shodmonov 26'; Komilov 34'; Begić 63'; Orifov 66'	Report	Paxratdinov 86'	Stadium: Bunyodkor; Referee: Abdurashid Xudoyberganov

April 22, 2024 2	Aral akademiya	0 – 16	OKMK	Olmaliq
(UTC+5)		Report	Xolmurodov 3', 24', 36'; Škrbić 18'; Toʻxtaxoʻjayev 22'; Rustamov 37'; Rukhadze 39', 50'; Maratov 43' (avt); Abdurahmonov 46', 55', 75', 90+2'; Abdurazzoqov 63'; Qosimov 84'; Gʻiyosov 86'	Stadium: OKMK; Referee: Ravshan Abduvohidov

April 22, 2024 2	Mashʼal	0 – 0	Buxoro	Mubarek
(UTC+5)		Report		Stadium: Bakhrom Vafoev; Referee: Sardor Ismatullayev

April 29, 2024 3	OKMK	2 – 2	Buxoro	Olmaliq
(UTC+5)	Xolmurodov 71'; Sentoku 82'		Jaloliddinov 78'; Abdullayev 90+4'	Stadium: OKMK

April 29, 2024 3	Mashʼal	8 – 0	Aral akademiya	Mubarek
(UTC+5)	Murodov 3', 24', 31', 36'; Babatunde 50'; Bekchanov 61'; Samariddinov 67'; Murtozayev 76'			Stadium: Bakhrom Vafoev

=== Group G ===
Pos	Team	Pld	W	D	L	GF	GA	GD	Pts	Qualification
1	Metallurg Bekobod	3	2	1	0	8	1	+7	7	Round of 16
2	Neftchi	3	2	1	0	8	2	+6	7	Round of 16
3	Dustlik	3	1	0	2	5	5	0	3	
4	Sirdaryo FA	3	0	0	3	2	15	−13	0	

Updated to match(es) played on 21-mart 2024-yil. Source: PFL

April 12, 2024 1	Neftchi	2 – 0	Doʻstlik	Fergana
(UTC+5)	Qodirqulov 26'; Norxonov 51'	Report		Stadium: Istiqlol; Attendance: 1.822; Referee: Rahimbek Karimov

April 12, 2024 1	Metallurg	5 – 0	Sirdaryo FA	Bekabad
(UTC+5)	Otaxonov 16'; Milićković 41'; Abduraimov 71'; Tursunqulov 81', 90+2'	Report		Stadium: Metallurg; Attendance: 986; Referee: Ravshan Abduvohidov

April 19, 2024 2	Sirdaryo FA	1 – 5	Neftchi	Sirdaryo
(UTC+5)	Abduhalilov 60'	Report	Norxonov 2'; Qodirqulov 26'; Gʻulomov 48'; Roman 54' (pen.); Turopov 78' (pen.)	Stadium: Yangiyer; Attendance: 715; Referee: Sultonmurod Abdurahmonov

April 19, 2024 2	Doʻstlik	0 – 2	Metallurg	Tashkent
(UTC+5)		Report	Đorđević 12'; Gʻofurbekov 62'	Stadium: Lokomotiv; Attendance: 254; Referee: Shavkat Nasibullayev

April 26, 2024 3	Neftchi	1 – 1	Metallurg	Fergana
(UTC+5)	G‘ulomov 27'		Abduraimov 18'	Stadium: Istiqlol

April 26, 2024 3	Doʻstlik	5 – 1	Sirdaryo FA	Tashkent
(UTC+5)	Asatillayev 9', 29'; Jumayev 55'; Sulaymonov 72'; Rahimov 90+3'		Qodirov 17'	Stadium: Lokomotiv

=== Group H ===
Pos	Team	Pld	W	D	L	GF	GA	GD	Pts	Qualification
1	Navbahor	3	2	1	0	4	2	+2	7	Round of 16
2	Andijon	3	1	1	1	4	4	0	4	Round of 16
3	Dinamo	3	0	3	0	6	6	0	3	
4	Nasaf	3	0	1	2	3	5	−2	1	

Updated to match(es) played on Completed. Source: PFL

April 13, 2024 1	Andijon	2 – 2	Dinamo	Andijan
(UTC+5)	Esanov 67'; Turdimurodov 88'	Report	Narh 11'; Kojo 73'	Stadium: Bobur Arena; Attendance: 15110; Referee: Shavkat Nasibullayev

April 13, 2024 1	Nasaf	0 – 1	Navbahor	Qarshi
(UTC+5)		Report	Ivanović 49'	Stadium: Qarshi markaziy Attendance: 5107; Referee: Temur Toʻxtasinov

April 21, 2024 2	Navbahor	2 – 1	Andijon	Namangan
(UTC+5)	Tabatadze 20' (pen.); Jokich 60'	Report	Bošnjak 88'	Stadium: Navbahor; Referee: Akobirxoʻja Shukurullayev

April 21, 2024 2	Dinamo	3 – 3	Nasaf	Jizzakh
(UTC+5)	Kojo 58'; Halilov 76', 90+1'	Report	Muhitdinov 37' (pen.); Marushich 79'; Mozgovoy 90+3'	Stadium: Sogdiana; Referee: Ilgiz Tantashev

April 28, 2024 3	Andijon	1 – 0	Nasaf	Andijan
(UTC+5)	Abdumannonov 90+8'			Stadium: Bobur Arena

April 28, 2024 3	Dinamo	1 – 1	Navbahor	Jizzakh
(UTC+5)	Kojo 82'		Shodiboyev 66'	Stadium: Sogdiana

=== Group I ===
Pos	Team	Pld	W	D	L	GF	GA	GD	Pts	Qualification
1	Sogdiana	3	3	0	0	7	2	+5	9	Round of 16
2	Paxtakor	3	1	1	1	4	4	0	4	Round of 16
3	Kokand 1912	3	0	2	1	1	3	−2	2	
4	Jizzax	3	0	1	2	2	5	−3	1	

Updated to match(es) played on March 21, 2024. Source: PFL

April 12, 2024 1	Jizzax	1 – 2	Pakhtakor	Jizzakh
(UTC+5)	Shodmonov 7'	Report	Hamdamov 2' (pen.); Merk 10'	Attendance: 352; Referee: Toʻrabek Suyunov

April 14, 2024 1	Kokand 1912	0 – 2	Soʻgʻdiyona	Fergana
(UTC+5)		Report	Abdurahmonov 51'; Mustafoqulov 85'	Stadium: Istiqlol; Attendance: 261; Referee: Gʻayrat Joʻrayev

April 19, 2024 2	Sogdiana	2 – 0	Jizzakh	Jizzakh
(UTC+5)	Jovović 22', 80'	Report		Stadium: Sogdiana; Attendance: 747; Referee: Doston Rahmonov

April 19, 2024 2	Pakhtakor	0 – 0	Kokand 1912	Tashkent
(UTC+5)		Report		Stadium: Pakhtakor; Attendance: 513; Referee: Rahimbek Karimov

April 26, 2024 3	Jizzakh	1 – 1	Kokand 1912	Jizzakh
(UTC+5)	Baxtiyorov 57' (pen.)		Toshtemirov 5'

April 26, 2024 3	Pakhtakor	2 – 3	Sogdiana	Tashkent
(UTC+5)	Merk 13', 75'		Mavlonqulov 6'; Abdurahmonov 12' (pen.); Andreyev 15'	Stadium: Pakhtakor

== Round of 16 ==
July 2, 2024
20:30 (UTC+5)
Round of 16

Olimpik MobiUz	1 – 2	Xorazm
Fomin 88'	Report	Bobojonov 55'; Matmurodov 76'

JAR, Tashkent
Referee: Shavkat Nasibullayev

July 3, 2024
20:30 (UTC+5)
Round of 16

Mashʼal	1 – 3 (a.e.t.)	Qizilqum
Babatunde 71'	Report	Gʻiyosov 38', 119'; Rahmatullayev 109'

Bakhrom Vafoev, Mubarek
Referee: Doston Rahmonov

July 4, 2024
20:30 (UTC+5)
Round of 16

Metallurg	1 – 1 (a.e.t.)	Surxon
Qoʻziyev 66'	Report	Saydazimov 34'
Penalties
Josović (penalty scored); Milićković (penalty scored); Tursunqulov (penalty scored); Sattorov (penalty scored); Ubaydullayev (penalty scored); Xayrullayev (penalty scored); Gʻofurbekov (penalty missed)	6–7	Xoshimov (penalty scored); Haydarov (penalty scored); Sherboʻtayev (penalty scored); Jumayev (penalty scored); Abdusalomov (penalty scored); Tursunov (penalty scored); Shamsiyev (penalty scored)

OKMK, Olmaliq
Referee: Sultonmurod Abdurahmonov

July 4, 2024
20:30 (UTC+5)
Round of 16

Olimpik	0 – 1	Andijon
	Report	Turdimurodov 30'

JAR, Tashkent
Referee: Olim Toʻychiboyev

July 5, 2024
20:30 (UTC+5)
Round of 16

Navbahor	1 – 0	Buxoro
Ivanović 45+7'	Report

Navbahor, Namangan
Referee: Asker Najafaliyev

July 5, 2024
20:30 (UTC+5)
Round of 16

Bunyodkor	2 – 1	Qiziriq
Ismonaliyev 19'; Abduxoliqov 84' (pen.)	Report	Normurodov 3' (o.g.)

Bunyodkor Stadium, Tashkent
Referee: Doston Mirzaraimov

July 5, 2024
20:30 (UTC+5)
Round of 16

Sogdiana	1 – 0	Neftchi
Hoshimov 112'	Report

Referee: Ilgiz Tantashev

July 5, 2024
20:30 (UTC+5)
Round of 16

Aral Nukus	0 – 1	Pakhtakor
	Report	Adkhamzoda 88'

Referee: Nayim Qosimov

== Quarter finals ==
The draw for the quarter-finals was made on July 6.

August 15, 2024
(UTC+5)
Quarter finals

Bunyodkor	0 – 1	Pakhtakor
	Report	Azmiddinov 101' (pen.)

Bunyodkor Stadium, Tashkent
Referee: Rustam Lutfulin

August 15, 2024
(UTC+5)
Quarter finals

Surkhon	3 – 1	Xorazm
Abdurahmonov 7'; Abdusalomov 32'; Haydarov 90'	Report	Malikov 10'

Dinamo, Samarkand
Referee: Toʻrabek Suyunov

August 7, 2024
(UTC+5)
Quarter finals

Sogdiana	2 – 3	Navbahor
Petrović 55'; Doriyev 109'	Report	Nikabadze 69'; Đokić 104'; Ivanović 112'

Sogdiana Stadium, Jizzakh
Referee: Asker Najafaliyev

August 7, 2024
(UTC+5)
Quarter finals

Qizilqum	0 – 3	Andijon
		Samiev 32'; Sohibjonov 50'; Gʻulomov 76'

Markaziy, Qarshi
Referee: Ravshan Abduvohidov

== Semi-finals ==
August 30, 2024
(UTC+5)
Semi-finals

Pakhtakor	0 – 0 (a.e.t.)	Navbahor
	Report
Penalties
Joʻraqoʻziyev (penalty scored); Hoshimov (penalty scored); Ibrohimov (penalty missed); Ćeran (penalty missed); Azmiddinov (penalty scored)	3 - 4	Ivanović (penalty missed); Đokić (penalty scored); Iminjonov (penalty scored); Hamrobekov (penalty scored); Iskanderov (penalty scored)

JAR, Tashkent
Referee: Rustam Lutfulin

August 30, 2024
(UTC+5)
Semi-finals

Andijon	0 – 0 (a.e.t.)	Surkhon
	Report
Penalties
Temirov (penalty scored); Pecelj (penalty scored); Mamatkazin (penalty scored); Shakhrom Samiev (penalty missed); Sardor Azimov (penalty scored); Vagiz Galiulin (penalty scored)	5 – 4	(penalty scored) Jamalutdinov; (penalty scored) Ramazonov; (penalty scored) Sherboʻtayev; (penalty scored) Xojiniyozov; (penalty missed) Abdusalomov; (penalty missed) Haydarov

Bobur Arena, Andijan
Referee: Ravshan Abduvohidov

== Final ==
5 October 2024
17:00 UZT

(Uzbekistan) Navbahor	2 – 3	(Uzbekistan) Andijon
Ismoilov 53'; Sayfiyev 119'	Report	Toirov 82'; Mamatkazin 116'; Bubanja 120+3'

Istiqlol, Fergana
Attendance: 20,000
Referee: Khalid al-Turais (Saudi Arabia)
