= Edem Nemanov =

Uzbek footballer

Personal information
- Date of birth: December 25, 2003 (age 22)
- Place of birth: Tashkent
- Height: 1.90 m (6 ft 3 in)
- Position: Goalkeeper

Team information
- Current team: Dinamo
- Number: 1

Senior career*
Years	Team	Apps	(Gls)
2022—2024	Chigʻatoy	4	(0)
2024	Olimpik	24	(0)
2025—	Dinamo	55	(0)

International career
2020—2021	Uzbekistan U18		
2022—2023	Uzbekistan U20	0	
2025—	Uzbekistan U23	2	(0)
- * Club domestic league appearances and goals

Edem Nemanov (born December 25, 2003, Tashkent) is an Uzbek footballer who plays as a goalkeeper for Dinamo Samarkand and Uzbekistan national team.

== Career ==
=== Clubs ===
He spent the first years of his career (from 2022 to 2024) at FC Chigʻatoy. In 2024, he played in 10 matches for FC Olympic. Since January 1, 2025, he has been the main goalkeeper of FC Dinamo. His contract with the club is valid until December 31, 2026.

=== National teams ===
He has successfully played for Uzbekistan's national teams at various ages. He has been a goalkeeper for Uzbekistan U17, U20 and U23 teams. He was the champion of AFC U-20 Asian Cup, which Uzbekistan hosted in 2023. In November 2026, he received a call-up to the Uzbekistan national football team.
