= 2024 Uzbekistan First League =

Uzbekistan First League
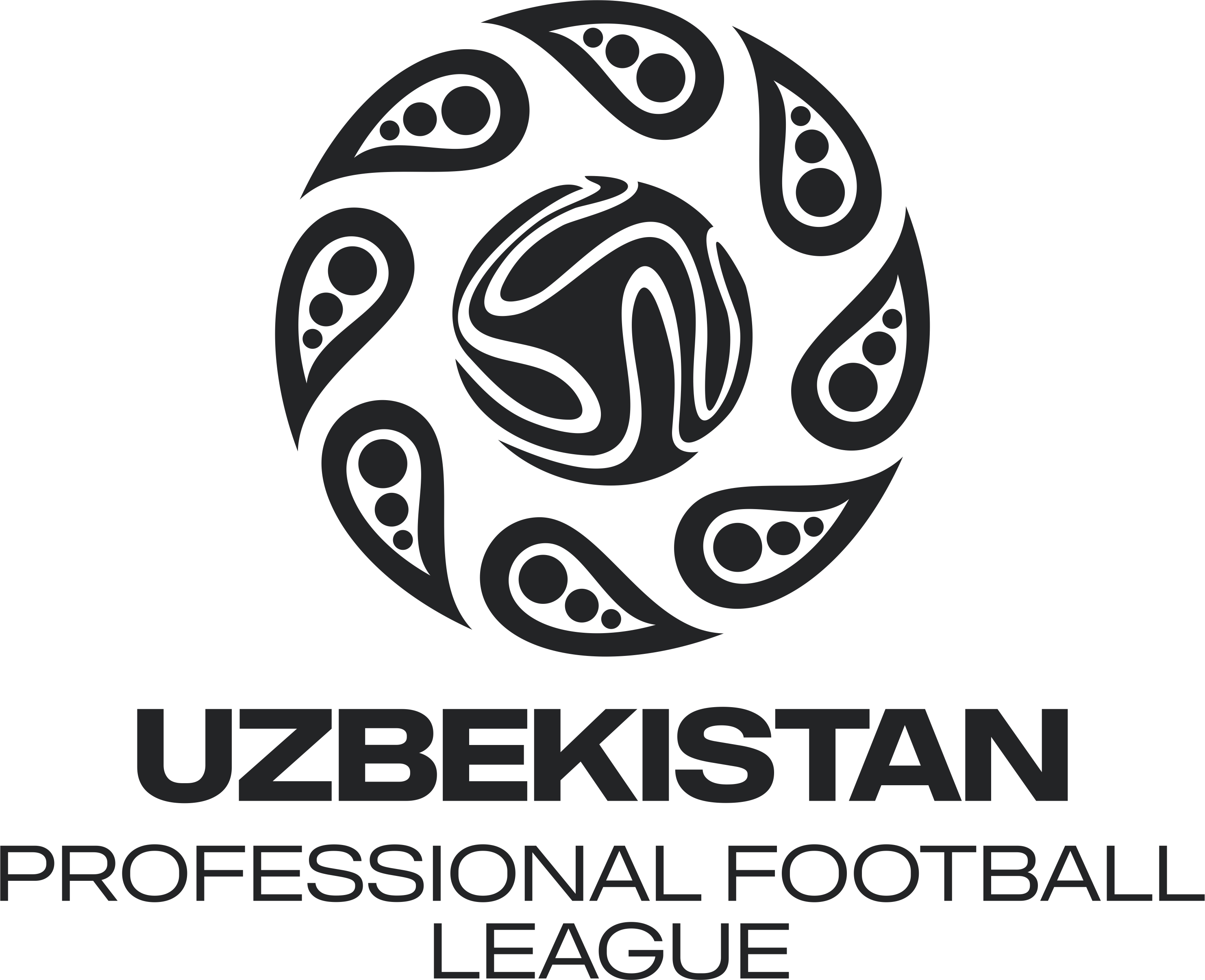
- Season: 2024
- Matches: 272
- Goals: 1,166 (4.29 per match)
- Top goalscorer: Rizo Ayvazov (25 goals)
- Biggest home win: Bunyodkor Farm 9–0 Turon (8 September 2024, Eastern Region); Zomin 7–0 Jizzakh FA (30 October 2024, Western Region); Qiziriq 7–0 Navoi FA (13 August 2024, Western Region); Jaykhun 7–0 Navoi FA (4 May 2024, Western Region); Jaykhun 8–1 Jizzakh FA (14 August 2024, Western Region)
- Biggest away win: Turon 0–8 Pakhtakor Farm (15 September 2024, Eastern Region); Navoi FA 0–8 Zomin (15 September 2024, Western Region)
- Highest scoring: Bunyodkor Farm 9–0 Turon (8 September 2024, Eastern Region); Fergana FA 2–7 Andijan FA (30 October 2024, Eastern Region); Fergana FA 1–8 Lokomotiv BFK (14 September 2024, Eastern Region); Navoi FA 3–9 Bukhara FA (30 June 2024)
- Longest winning run: 7 matches – Sementchi (Eastern Region); 8 matches – Nasaf Farm (Western Region)
- Longest unbeaten run: 14 matches – FarDU (Eastern Region) 17 matches – Nasaf Farm (Western Region)
- Longest winless run: 22 matches – Fergana FA (Eastern Region) 13 matches – Jizzakh FA (Western Region)
- Longest losing run: 16 matches – Fergana FA (Eastern Region) 11 matches – Jizzakh FA (Western Region)
- All statistics correct as of 16 November 2024.

The 2024 Uzbekistan First League season in football (in Uzbek:Футбол бўйича 2024-йилги Ўзбекистон Биринчи лигаси) is the fifth season of the Uzbekistan First League.

== Participants ==
In the 2024 season, 26 teams are participating in the First League. These 26 teams are divided into two zones of 13 teams each, and each team will play a total of 24 matches.

Club	City	Region	Head coach	Stadium	Capacity
Andijon FA	Andijan	Andijan Region	(Uzbekistan) Islomjon Ahmedov	Andijon 1st CYSS Stadium	500
Bunyodkor Farm	Tashkent		(Uzbekistan) Anvar Rahimov	Bunyodkor Academy Stadium	
Bukhara FA	Bukhara	Bukhara Region	(Uzbekistan) Azamat Sharipov	Bukhara Football Academy Stadium	
BukhSU	Bukhara	Bukhara Region	(Uzbekistan) Gʻolib Kazakov	Umid Stadium	
Fergana FA	Fergana	Fergana Region	(Uzbekistan) Boburjon Madaminov		
FerSU	Fergana	Fergana Region	(Uzbekistan) Sergey Lebedev	Fergana Stadium	3,000
Jaykhun	Nukus	Republic of Karakalpakstan	(Uzbekistan) Marat Auezniyazov	Nukus CYSS Stadium	
Jizzakh	Jizzakh	Jizzakh Region	(Uzbekistan) Sunnatulla Yoqubov	Jizzakh Football Academy Stadium	
Jizzakh FA	Jizzakh	Jizzakh Region	(Uzbekistan) Bahodir Rashidov	Jizzakh Football Academy Stadium	
Lokomotiv BFK	Tashkent		(Uzbekistan) Ravshan Ahmedov	Tashkent Football Academy Stadium	1,000
Namangan FA	Namangan	Namangan Region	(Uzbekistan) Oʻtkirbek Ergashev	Yosh Kuch Stadium	3,000
Nasaf Farm	Karshi	Qashqadaryo Region	(Uzbekistan) Zafar Xolmurodov	Mehnatchi Stadium Beshkent Central Stadium	
Navbahor Farm	Namangan	Namangan Region	(Uzbekistan) Rashid Gʻafurov	Yosh Kuch Stadium	3,000
Navoi FA	Navoi	Navoi Region	(Uzbekistan) Davron Tursunov	Yoshlik Stadium	
Pakhtakor-2	Tashkent		(Uzbekistan) Shuhrat Boʻriyev	Qibray Stadium	1,000
Qiziriq	Qiziriq District	Surxondaryo Region	(Uzbekistan) Eldor Boymatov	Qiziriq Stadium	
Aral Academy	Nukus	Republic of Karakalpakstan	(Uzbekistan) Navroʻz Alimov	Nukus CYSS Stadium NOPSTTM Stadium	
Sirdaryo FA	Yangiyer	Sirdaryo Region	(Uzbekistan) Bahodir Hakimqulov	Yangiyer Stadium	
Sementchi	Kuvasoy	Fergana Region	(Uzbekistan) Murod Ismoilov	Sementchi Stadium	5,000
Tashkent RFA	Yangiyoʻl District	Tashkent Region	(Uzbekistan) Zafarjon Sodiqov	Tashkent Region FA Stadium	
Turon	Uzbekistan District	Fergana Region	(Uzbekistan) Mirjalol Joʻrayev	Uzbekistan Stadium	8,000
Khorezm FA	Urgench	Khorezm Region	(Uzbekistan) Maʼmurjon Abdullayev	Khorezm SM Khiva SM	
Zomin	Zomin	Jizzakh Region	(Uzbekistan) Zayniddin Tojiyev	Zomin Stadium Odil Akhmedov Academy Stadium	
Chigʻatoy	Chigʻatoy	Tashkent Region	(Uzbekistan) Dmitriy Kim	Chigʻatoy Stadium	

== Play-off ==
=== Quarter-finals ===
November 4, 2024
9:30 UZT

Jayxun	0–3	Bunyodkor Farm
	Report	Asadjon Azimjonov 47'; Ikrom Erkinov 59'; Amal Uvraimov 90+1'

Adil Akhmedov Academy Stadium
Attendance: 112
Referee: Maʼmurjon Ilhomov

November 4, 2024
12:00 UZT

FarDU	4–1	Zomin
Abrorjon Inomov 25', 27'; Sirojiddin Bashriddinov 83'; Muhammadqodir Umarjonov 89'	Report	Baxtiyor Tojiyev 62'

Bunyodkor Akademiyasi stadioni
Attendance: 85
Referee: Shavkat Nasibullayev

November 4, 2024
12:00 UZT

Sementchi	2–4	Qiziriq
Qosimov 20'; Umidjon Karilov 45+2'	Report	Dilshod Hushbaqov 85', 89'; Muhriddin Shamsiddinov 81'; Oʻral Choriyev 90+2'

Adil Akhmedov Academy Stadium
Attendance: 132
Referee: Asker Najafaliyev

November 4, 2024
14:30 UZT

Nasaf Farm	3–0	FC Lokomotiv BFK
Sardor Bekmurodov 17'; Turdibek Omonov 55'; Elbek Boʻriyev 85'	Report

Adil Akhmedov Academy Stadium
Attendance: 146
Referee: Alisher Abduvohidov

=== Semi-final ===
November 6, 2024
11:00 UZT

Qiziriq	2–1	FarDU
Dilshod Hushbaqov 64'; Nizomjon Norov 68'	Report	Ayvazov 21'

Adil Akhmedov Academy Stadium, Ташкент
Attendance: 105
Referee: Doston Rahmonov

November 6, 2024
14:30 UZT

Nasaf Farm	1–1	Bunyodkor Farm
Sherali Rasulov 37'	Report	Otabek Boltayev 12'
Penalties
	3–1

Adil Akhmedov Academy Stadium, Ташкент
Attendance: 124
Referee: Alisher Toʻxtasinov

=== For third place ===
November 8, 2024
11:00 UZT

FarDU	2–0	Bunyodkor Farm
Rizo Ayvazov 82', 90'	Report

Adil Akhmedov Academy Stadium, Ташкент
Attendance: 65
Referee: Sardor Mirodilov

=== Final ===
November 8, 2024
14:00 UZT

Qiziriq	1–1	Nasaf Farm
Bobur Pardayev 30'	Report	Muhammadali Movlonov 24'
Penalties
	2–4

Odil Akhmedov Academy Stadium, Tashkent
Attendance: 77
Referee: Asker Najafaliyev

== Results ==
=== East Region ===
==== Table of results ====
Home \ Away	AND	BUN	FAR	FDU	LOK	NAM	NAV	PAK	SEM	TFA	TUR	CHI
Andijon FA	—	0–2	6–0	0–6	2–5	0–2	1–3	1–3	2–4	1–1	2–0	1–4
Bunyodkor-2	7–0	—	6–0	1–2	0–1	1–2	3–2	2–1	0–0	6–0	9–0	3–3
Fargʻona FA	2–7	0–3	—	1–7	1–8	0–3	1–7	2–2	0–5	1–2	1–1	0–5
FarDU	1–2	2–0	6–1	—	0–1	3–0	0–0	6–1	5–2	5–0	5–1	3–0
Lokomotiv BFK	4–0	1–2	6–2	0–2	—	1–3	2–1	2–2	0–5	3–1	5–2	1–1
Namangan FA	3–1	0–1	4–0	4–5	2–2	—	0–4	2–3	0–1	4–0	4–0	1–3
Navbahor Farm	5–0	1–2	4–3	1–1	4–3	1–1	—	1–3	1–2	3–0	4–1	4–3
Pakhtakor-2	1–0	1–0	5–0	1–1	0–1	1–2	0–4	—	1–2	3–0	5–1	0–3
Sementchi	5–1	4–1	4–0	2–1	2–1	3–0	0–0	7–1	—	3–1	6–1	2–1
Ташкент VFA	3–1	1–4	1–1	0–3	1–3	3–4	0–5	3–3	1–1	—	3–3	3–4
Turon	0–2	1–3	4–0	1–4	1–2	1–2	0–5	0–8	0–7	2–3	—	1–1
Chigʻatoy	5–0	2–3	6–0	0–2	2–3	5–2	1–1	2–3	3–1	8–0	6–0	—

Updated to match(es) played on October 30, 2024. Source: Uzbekistan Professional Football League
Legend: Blue = home team win; Yellow = draw; Red = away team win.

==== Results by games played ====
Team ╲ Round	1	2	3	4	5	6	7	8	9	10	11	12	13	14	15	16	17	18	19	20	21	22	23	24	25	26
Andijon FA	L	R	W	L	L	L	L	L	L	W	D	R	W	L	R	W	L	L	L	L	L	L	L	L	R	W
Bunyodkor-2	R	W	W	W	W	R	L	W	D	W	L	L	W	R	W	W	W	W	R	W	D	L	L	W	L	W
Fargʻona FA	D	L	D	L	L	L	L	L	L	R	R	L	L	L	L	L	L	L	L	L	L	D	R	R	L	L
FarDU	W	L	L	W	R	W	R	W	D	L	W	W	D	W	W	W	W	R	W	R	W	D	W	W	W	W
Lokomotiv BFK	R	L	W	W	R	W	L	W	W	L	W	D	L	R	D	L	W	R	W	W	W	W	W	D	W	L
Namangan FA	L	W	R	L	W	R	W	L	W	W	W	L	L	L	D	R	L	W	R	W	D	W	W	L	W	L
Navbahor Farm	W	W	L	W	W	D	W	W	D	W	R	W	R	W	W	L	L	D	L	L	D	D	W	R	W	R
Pakhtakor-2	D	R	D	L	W	W	W	R	L	L	L	W	D	L	R	W	W	W	W	L	R	W	L	D	L	L
Sementchi	W	W	D	R	W	D	W	W	D	W	L	R	W	W	L	W	R	W	W	W	W	W	W	W	R	W
Ташкент VFA	D	L	D	L	L	L	R	R	W	L	D	D	L	L	L	L	L	L	L	R	R	D	L	W	W	L
Turon	D	L	L	R	L	L	D	L	L	L	L	D	R	W	L	L	R	L	L	L	L	L	L	L	L	R
Chigʻatoy	L	W	R	W	L	W	D	L	W	R	W	D	W	L	W	R	W	D	W	W	D	L	R	L	L	W

Updated to match(es) played on October 30, 2024. Source: Uzbekistan Professional Football League
W = Gʻalaba; D = Draw; L = Loss; P = Postponed; R = Round to be skipped (teams rested in this round)

==== Standings by games played ====
Team ╲ Round	1	2	3	4	5	6	7	8	9	10	11	12	13	14	15	16	17	18	19	20	21	22	23	24	25	26
Andijon FA	12	12	9	8	9	9	9	9	9	9	9	10	9	9	9	9	9	9	9	9	9	9	9	9	9	9
Bunyodkor-2	3	2	1	1	1	2	3	3	3	3	3	4	3	4	4	4	3	1	3	2	3	3	3	3	3	3
Fargʻona FA	8	10	11	11	11	11	12	12	12	12	12	12	12	12	12	12	12	12	12	12	12	12	12	12	12	12
FarDU	2	5	6	5	5	5	5	4	5	6	6	3	4	3	3	3	2	4	2	3	2	2	2	2	2	2
Lokomotiv BFK	9	11	8	6	7	6	7	5	4	4	4	5	6	6	6	7	7	7	7	7	6	5	5	4	4	4
Namangan FA	10	6	7	7	6	8	6	7	7	5	5	6	7	7	7	8	8	8	8	8	8	8	8	8	6	7
Navbahor Farm	1	1	2	2	2	1	1	1	1	1	1	1	1	1	1	1	1	2	4	4	4	4	4	5	5	5
Pakhtakor-2	5	4	5	10	8	7	8	8	8	8	8	8	8	8	8	6	6	6	6	6	7	7	7	7	8	8
Sementchi	4	3	3	3	3	3	2	2	2	2	2	2	2	2	2	2	4	3	1	1	1	1	1	1	1	1
Ташкент VFA	6	8	10	9	10	10	10	10	10	10	10	9	10	10	10	10	10	10	10	10	10	10	10	10	10	10
Turon	7	9	12	12	12	12	11	11	11	11	11	11	11	11	11	11	11	11	11	11	11	11	11	11	11	11
Chigʻatoy	11	7	4	4	4	4	4	6	6	7	7	7	5	5	5	5	5	5	5	5	5	6	6	6	7	6

Qualification to the First League Playoffs
Qualification to the First League Playoffs
Qualification to the First League Playoffs

Updated to match(es) played on October 30, 2024. Source: Uzbekistan Professional Football League

=== Western region ===
==== Results table ====
Home \ Away	ARA	BXD	BUX	JAY	JIZ	JFA	NAS	NAV	QIZ	SIR	KHO	ZOM
Aral akademiya	—	2–3	2–1	0–5	2–2	3–0	2–1	2–1	2–3	2–0	1–1	1–5
BuxDU	2–2	—	2–0	0–1	3–2	6–1	1–3	7–1	2–1	3–3	2–1	4–2
Buxoro FA	1–4	0–2	—	0–3	1–2	7–1	1–1	6–1	1–1	1–2	2–2	2–3
Jaykhun	3–0	2–1	3–0	—	3–0	8–1	3–0	7–0	2–2	5–0	4–0	1–2
Jizzakh	3–2	3–1	1–4	0–2	—	4–1	0–2	2–0	1–4	2–2	0–2	1–3
Jizzakh FA	1–3	1–1	1–0	0–6	0–2	—	0–3	1–0	2–4	3–7	0–6	0–7
Nasaf-2	3–1	3–0	4–1	1–0	1–2	5–1	—	3–0	1–0	4–1	2–0	4–1
Navoiy FA	1–0	3–9	3–1	1–5	2–4	3–1	2–5	—	1–5	3–4	0–6	0–8
Qiziriq	3–3	2–1	1–0	1–1	4–0	5–1	1–3	7–0	—	2–2	2–3	2–1
Sirdaryo FA	3–2	3–5	2–1	2–7	1–2	4–1	0–4	3–0	0–4	—	2–0	4–0
Khorazm FA	2–0	1–1	0–1	0–0	4–0	5–0	1–3	1–0	0–3	3–1	—	0–1
Zaamin	2–1	4–2	4–2	0–3	3–1	7–0	1–5	3–0	2–3	1–0	3–0	—

Updated to match(es) played on October 30, 2024. Source: Uzbekistan Professional Football League
Legend: Blue = home team win; Yellow = draw; Red = away team win.

==== Results by games played ====
Team ╲ Round	1	2	3	4	5	6	7	8	9	10	11	12	13	14	15	16	17	18	19	20	21	22	23	24	25	26
Aral akademiya	D	R	W	L	W	L	L	L	L	L	D	W	R	L	R	L	W	W	W	D	L	D	L	L	W	R
BuxDU	R	W	L	L	D	W	W	W	R	L	W	W	W	R	L	W	L	W	W	D	L	R	L	D	D	W
Buxoro FA	R	L	L	L	W	L	L	L	L	W	R	L	L	R	D	L	W	L	L	L	D	L	D	R	L	W
Jaykhun	W	W	W	W	L	D	R	W	W	W	W	R	L	W	W	W	W	W	D	R	D	W	W	W	R	W
Jizzakh	D	R	R	W	D	W	W	L	L	L	L	L	W	W	R	R	L	W	W	W	W	L	L	L	L	L
Jizzakh FA	L	L	L	W	L	L	R	L	L	R	W	L	L	L	L	L	L	L	L	R	L	L	R	L	D	L
Nasaf-2	W	W	L	L	R	R	W	W	W	W	W	W	W	W	D	W	W	R	R	W	W	W	W	W	W	L
Navoiy FA	L	L	L	L	L	W	L	R	L	L	L	R	L	L	L	L	L	W	L	L	R	L	L	W	R	L
Qiziriq	W	W	W	W	R	D	W	W	W	W	R	L	W	W	W	L	W	R	D	L	D	D	W	R	L	D
Sirdaryo FA	L	W	W	W	D	R	L	R	W	W	L	L	L	L	L	W	L	L	R	L	R	W	W	D	W	D
Khorazm FA	L	L	W	W	D	L	L	L	R	L	D	W	R	L	W	W	W	L	L	W	D	R	D	W	W	R
Zaamin	W	L	R	L	W	W	W	W	W	R	L	W	W	W	W	R	L	L	W	W	W	W	R	L	L	W

Updated to match(es) played on October 30, 2024. Source: Uzbekistan Professional Football League
W = Gʻalaba; D = Draw; L = Loss; P = Postponed; R = Round to be skipped (teams rested in this round)

==== Standings by games played ====
Team ╲ Round	1	2	3	4	5	6	7	8	9	10	11	12	13	14	15	16	17	18	19	20	21	22	23	24	25	26
Aral akademiya	7	7	6	7	6	8	9	8	8	9	9	9	9	9	9	9	9	8	8	8	8	8	9	9	9	9
BuxDU	4	4	8	9	9	7	8	5	6	7	5	5	5	5	5	5	5	5	5	5	6	6	6	5	5	5
Buxoro FA	9	10	10	11	10	10	10	11	11	10	10	10	10	10	10	10	10	10	10	10	10	10	10	10	10	10
Jaykhun	5	3	1	1	1	1	1	2	2	2	2	1	2	2	2	1	1	1	1	1	2	2	2	2	2	2
Jizzakh	6	8	5	6	4	3	4	4	5	6	7	7	6	6	6	6	7	6	6	6	5	5	5	6	8	8
Jizzakh FA	12	12	12	10	11	11	11	12	12	12	11	11	11	11	11	11	11	12	12	11	12	12	12	12	12	12
Nasaf-2	3	2	3	5	7	9	6	6	4	4	3	3	3	4	4	3	3	3	3	2	1	1	1	1	1	1
Navoiy FA	11	11	11	12	12	12	12	10	10	11	12	12	12	12	12	12	12	11	11	12	11	11	11	11	11	11
Qiziriq	1	1	2	2	2	2	2	1	1	1	1	2	1	1	1	2	2	2	2	3	3	4	4	3	3	4
Sirdaryo FA	8	5	4	3	3	4	5	7	7	5	6	6	7	7	8	8	8	9	9	9	9	9	8	8	7	7
Khorazm FA	10	9	7	4	5	6	7	9	9	8	8	8	8	8	7	7	6	7	7	7	7	7	7	7	6	6
Zaamin	2	6	8	8	8	5	3	3	3	3	4	4	4	3	3	4	4	4	4	4	4	3	3	4	4	3

Qualification to the First League Playoffs
Qualification to the First League Playoffs
Qualification to the First League Playoffs

Updated to match(es) played on October 30, 2024. Source: Uzbekistan Professional Football League

== Goalscorers ==
=== By club ===
№	Player	Club	Goals
1	(Uzbekistan) Rizo Ayvazov	FarDU	25
2	(Uzbekistan) Dilshod Hushbaqov	Qiziriq	23
3	(Uzbekistan) Sherali Rasulov	Sementchi / Nasaf-2	18
4	(Uzbekistan) Sardorbek Saidov	Nasaf-2	16
5	(Uzbekistan) Sahob Rashidov	Jizzakh	16
6	(Uzbekistan) Davron Toʻlaganov	Pakhtakor-2	15
7	(Uzbekistan) Muhammadjon Abdurashidov	Lokomotiv BFK	15
8	(Uzbekistan) Farruhbek Abdurahmonov	Namangan FA	15
9	(Uzbekistan) Alizod Toʻxtayev	Nasaf Farm	14

=== By player ===
As of 10th November 2024

During the tournament, 419 goals were scored in 168 matches (an average of 2.5 goals per match).

25 goals

- (Uzbekistan) Rizo Ayvazov

17 goals

- (Uzbekistan) Sherali Rasulov

16 goals

- (Uzbekistan) Farruhbek Abdurahmonov
- (Uzbekistan) Sardorbek Saidov

15 goals

- (Uzbekistan) Muhammadjon Abdurashidov
- (Uzbekistan) Davron Toʻlaganov

14 goals

- (Uzbekistan) Elbekjon Yoʻlchiyev
- (Uzbekistan) Mirzabek Daryabayev
- (Uzbekistan) Alizod Toʻxtayev

13 goals

- (Uzbekistan) Ulugʻbek Javgarov
- (Uzbekistan) Asadjon Azimjonov
- (Uzbekistan) Rahmatullo Rahimov
- (Uzbekistan) Shuhrat Daryoboyev

12 goals

- (Uzbekistan) Jahongir Tursunov
- (Uzbekistan) Baxtiyor Tojiyev

11 goals

- (Uzbekistan) Feruz Olimov

10 goals

- (Uzbekistan) Isroiljon Tursunboyev
- (Uzbekistan) Dilshodbek Umirzoqov
- (Uzbekistan) Abdurahmon Abdullayev

9 goals

- (Uzbekistan) Otabek Zokirov
- (Uzbekistan) Jasur Ahmedov
- (Uzbekistan) Bilol Usmonov
- (Uzbekistan) Mirjalol Qosimov
- (Uzbekistan) Nurlibek Talasboyev
- (Uzbekistan) Murod Mambetov

8 goals

- (Uzbekistan) Jahongir Isomiddinov
- (Uzbekistan) Shohruh Abdumannopov
- (Uzbekistan) Elbek Boʻriyev
- (Uzbekistan) Aslbek Umirzoqov

7 goals

- (Uzbekistan) Behruz Ismatov
- (Uzbekistan) Sanjarbek Zokirov
- (Uzbekistan) Bahodir Abduvaliyev
- (Uzbekistan) Kamronbek Yusupov

6 goals

- (Uzbekistan) Farhod Oʻtkirov
- (Uzbekistan) Abrorjon Inomov
- (Uzbekistan) Asilbek Orifjonov
- (Uzbekistan) Humoyun Sodiqov
- (Uzbekistan) Sirojiddin Bashriddinov
- (Uzbekistan) Abdulahadjon Hoshimov
- (Uzbekistan) Akbar Xudoyberdiyev
- (Uzbekistan) Azamat Abdurashidov

5 goals

- (Uzbekistan) Sardorbek Solijonov
- (Uzbekistan) Samandar Oʻrinboyev
- (Uzbekistan) Bekmurod Akramov
- (Uzbekistan) Nodirbek Karimov
- (Uzbekistan) Nurgʻani Jumatayev
- (Uzbekistan) Baxtiyor Arazov

4 goals

- (Uzbekistan) Sardor Fozilov
- (Uzbekistan) Nosirjon Abdusalomov
- (Uzbekistan) Ikrom Erkinov
- (Uzbekistan) Otabek Boltayev
- (Uzbekistan) Abduxoliq Qurbonov
- (Uzbekistan) Ozodbek Oʻrazgulov
- (Uzbekistan) Nodirbek Saidakbarov
- (Uzbekistan) Davronbek Olimjonov
- (Uzbekistan) Komiljon Tojiddinov
- (Uzbekistan) Kuvanishbek Saydaliyev
- (Uzbekistan) Farruh Agaev
- (Uzbekistan) Shohrux Eraliyev
- (Uzbekistan) Amza Ibragimov
- (Uzbekistan) Asadbek Joʻraqulov
- (Uzbekistan) Javlonbek Primbetov
- (Uzbekistan) Abdumalik Norqobilov
- (Uzbekistan) Elyor Rahimov

3 goals

- (Uzbekistan) Patidin Zuhriddinov
- (Uzbekistan) Ravshanbek Omonboyev
- (Uzbekistan) Izzatillo Akramov
- (Uzbekistan) Farxod Tursunaliyev
- (Uzbekistan) Fazliddinxoʻja Ubaydullayev
- (Uzbekistan) Rasuljon Abdurahmonov
- (Uzbekistan) Jahongir Safarov
- (Uzbekistan) Ahrorbek Oʻktamov
- (Uzbekistan) Muhammadqodir Umarjonov
- (Uzbekistan) Akobir Moʻminov
- (Uzbekistan) Javohir Bahodirov
- (Uzbekistan) Abbosjon Axmadjonov
- (Uzbekistan) Kamron Neʼmatjonov
- (Uzbekistan) Lutfulloh Nuriddinov
- (Uzbekistan) Muhammadsodiq Ibrohimov
- (Uzbekistan) Azimjon Abdulazizov
- (Uzbekistan) Muhammad Odilov
- (Uzbekistan) Sherzod Hayrullayev
- (Uzbekistan) Nurmuhammad Abdugʻaniyev
- (Uzbekistan) Asliddin Tursunpoʻlatov
- (Uzbekistan) Toxir Yoʻldoshev
- (Uzbekistan) Behruz Akramov
- (Uzbekistan) Abdurahmon Daminov
- (Uzbekistan) Sarvar Sharipov
- (Uzbekistan) Izzatilla Yusupov
- (Uzbekistan) Behruz Bahodirov
- (Uzbekistan) Turdibek Omonov
- (Uzbekistan) Damir Nuredilov

2 goals

- (Uzbekistan) Adhamjon Nomonov
- (Uzbekistan) Muhammadiyor Xurxonov
- (Uzbekistan) Kirill Volnuxin
- (Uzbekistan) Arslonbek Bahromov
- (Uzbekistan) Roʻzimuhammad Tolibjonov
- (Uzbekistan) Nozimjon Bobojonov
- (Uzbekistan) Doston Qurbonov
- (Uzbekistan) Oybek Munavvarov
- (Uzbekistan) Abbos Toʻychiyev
- (Uzbekistan) Mirjalol Anvarov
- (Uzbekistan) Ramazon Yoʻldoshev
- (Uzbekistan) Diyorbek Inomov
- (Uzbekistan) Abbos Mahmudov
- (Uzbekistan) Abdusalom Nuriddinov
- (Uzbekistan) Jasurbek Abdulbekov
- (Uzbekistan) Shavkat Sattorov
- (Uzbekistan) Sardor Mirqobilov
- (Uzbekistan) Azamat Halilov
- (Uzbekistan) Ulugʻbek Muhammadjonov
- (Uzbekistan) Akobirjon Ahmadjonov
- (Uzbekistan) Yahyobek Zokirov
- (Uzbekistan) Asrorjon Abduraxmonov
- (Uzbekistan) Lazizbek Ashurov
- (Uzbekistan) Bobur Ergashev
- (Uzbekistan) Xurshidbek Fayziyev
- (Uzbekistan) Ravan Havasov
- (Uzbekistan) Asadxoʻja Ahmedxoʻjayev
- (Uzbekistan) Aybek Sdikov
- (Uzbekistan) Abdusalom Toʻrayev
- (Uzbekistan) Muhammad Yahyoyev
- (Uzbekistan) Jonibek Beganjiyev
- (Uzbekistan) Diyorbek Toirov
- (Uzbekistan) Sergey Proxorov

1 goal

- (Uzbekistan) Bekmurodjon Abduraimjonov
- (Uzbekistan) Muhammadali Abdurashidov
- (Uzbekistan) Mirkomil Annamatov
- (Uzbekistan) Muhammadaziz Husanov
- (Uzbekistan) Amal Uvraimov
- (Uzbekistan) Abdugʻani Kamolov
- (Uzbekistan) Abdurahmon Yoʻldoshev
- (Uzbekistan) Asror Qulahmedov
- (Uzbekistan) Shodiyor Hojimatov
- (Uzbekistan) Dostonjon Rashidov
- (Uzbekistan) Elyor Mamasoliyev
- (Uzbekistan) Sarvarbek Mirzahoshimov
- (Uzbekistan) Aliyor Nomonov
- (Uzbekistan) Behruz Mahmudov
- (Uzbekistan) Akmaljon Muhammadjonov
- (Uzbekistan) Shohrux Anarboyev
- (Uzbekistan) Erkinjon Erkinov
- (Uzbekistan) Salyay-Axun Tursunov
- (Uzbekistan) Ibrohim Najimov
- (Uzbekistan) Alisher Islomov
- (Uzbekistan) Otabek Turobov
- (Uzbekistan) Usmonali Abdukarimov
- (Uzbekistan) Farruhbek Abdurahmonov
- (Uzbekistan) Omadbek Toshtemirov
- (Uzbekistan) Hojiakbar Nurmatov
- (Uzbekistan) Azizbek Xursanboyev
- (Uzbekistan) Firdavs Umaraliyev
- (Uzbekistan) Muhammadali Alisherov
- (Uzbekistan) Odiljon Abdumutaliyev
- (Uzbekistan) Maʼmurjon Zokirjonov
- (Uzbekistan) Muhammadziyo Abdulxodiyev
- (Uzbekistan) Uchqunjon Zokirjonov
- (Uzbekistan) Mironshox Mexmonov
- (Uzbekistan) Diyorbek Qoshmatov
- (Uzbekistan) Bobur Abdujabborov
- (Uzbekistan) Behruz Tojiboyev
- (Uzbekistan) Mirjamol Neʼmatov
- (Uzbekistan) Umidjon Karilov
- (Uzbekistan) Mirjalol Mirzayev
- (Uzbekistan) Nodir Nurmatov
- (Uzbekistan) Hasan Yoʻldoshev
- (Uzbekistan) Muhammadali Nosirjonov
- (Uzbekistan) Oʻtkir Oʻktamov
- (Uzbekistan) Yahyo Zuhriddinov
- (Uzbekistan) Diyorbek Rahimjonov
- (Uzbekistan) Davlatbek Sulaymonov
- (Uzbekistan) Foziljon Tohirjonov
- (Uzbekistan) Nizom Ahmadov
- (Uzbekistan) Mardon Kidirbayev
- (Uzbekistan) Tohirjon Ashuboyev
- (Uzbekistan) Shingizxon Tuymekulov
- (Uzbekistan) Sevinchbek Saidahmadov
- (Uzbekistan) Fazliddin Nurmatov
- (Uzbekistan) Saidazamxoʻja Soliyev
- (Uzbekistan) Husan Akmuratov
- (Uzbekistan) Ismoil Abdurahmonov
- (Uzbekistan) Jaloloddin Asraqulov
- (Uzbekistan) Abdulla Tursunboyev
- (Uzbekistan) Javlon Yoʻldoshev
- (Uzbekistan) Sardorbek Salimov
- (Uzbekistan) Miyrbek Kalmurzayev
- (Uzbekistan) Asadbek Mustafoqulov
- (Uzbekistan) Albert Sdikov
- (Uzbekistan) Diyorbek Asomiddinov
- (Uzbekistan) Elbek Otaqulov
- (Uzbekistan) Sardor Bekmurodov
- (Uzbekistan) Shahzod Hushvaqtov
- (Uzbekistan) Muhammadali Movlonov
- (Uzbekistan) Diyorbek Shavkiyev
- (Uzbekistan) Ozod Rajabov
- (Uzbekistan) Quvonchbek Choʻlponov

1 own goal

- (Uzbekistan) Nomonxon Joʻnashev
- (Uzbekistan) Abduxoliq Qurbonov
- (Uzbekistan) Kamronbek Temirov
- (Uzbekistan) Akbar Xudoyberdiyev
- (Uzbekistan) Jahongir Tursunov
- (Uzbekistan) Asilbek Orifjonov
- (Uzbekistan) Davronbek Olimjonov
- (Uzbekistan) Salyay-Axun Tursunov
- (Uzbekistan) Behruz Bahodirov
- (Uzbekistan) Mirjalol Anvarov
- (Uzbekistan) Shohjahon Sharipov
- (Uzbekistan) Sunnatbek Ahmedov
- (Uzbekistan) Abror Abdurazoqov

2 own goals

- (Uzbekistan) Kuvanishbek Saydaliyev
