= 2025 Uzbekistan Pro League =

Uzbekistan Pro League
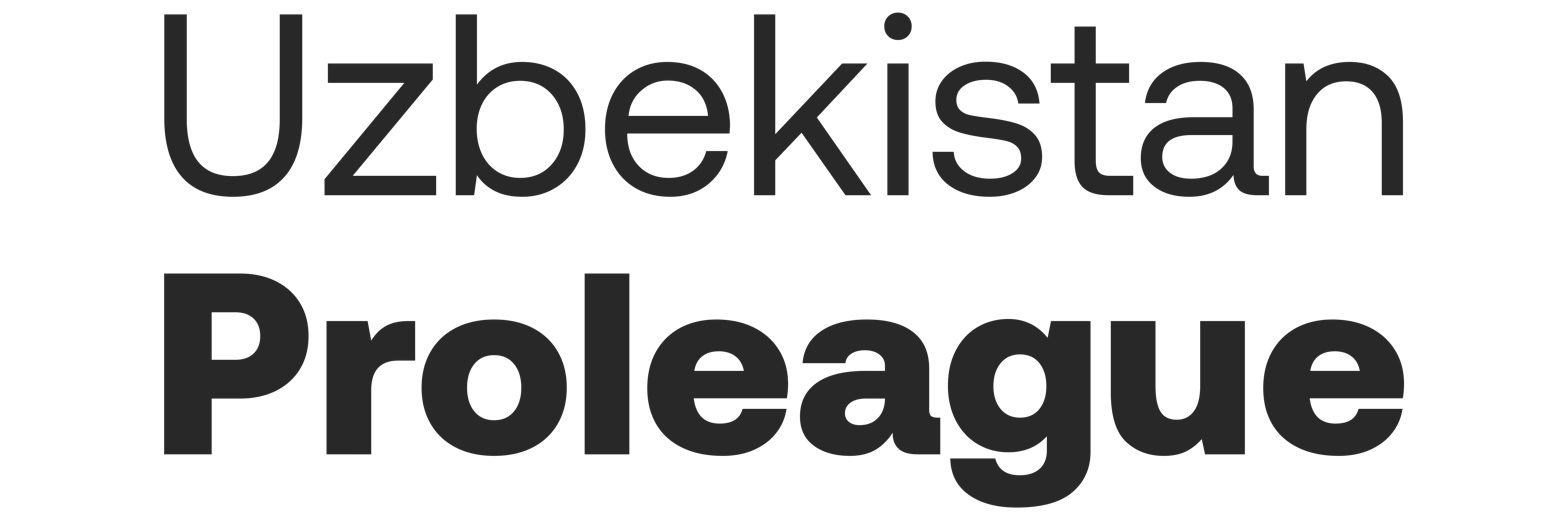
- Logo
- Season: March-November 2025
- Champions: Lokomotiv Tashkent (3rd title)
- Promoted: Lokomotiv Tashkent
- Relegated: Olympic
- Matches: 60
- Goals: 146 (2.43 per match)
- Top goalscorer: (Uzbekistan) Muhriddin Zoirov
- Biggest home win: Lokomotiv 5–0 Jaykhun; August 23, 2025
- Biggest away win: Jaykhun 2–5 Lokomotiv; October 27, 2025
- Highest scoring: Jaykhun 2–5 Lokomotiv; October 27, 2025
- Longest winning run: Aral (9 times)
- Longest losing run: Olympic (6 tmes)
- Highest attendance: 1,600 people FarDU 1-2 Lokomotiv; April 12, 2025
- Lowest attendance: 53 people Olympic 0—3 Aral; November 3, 2025
- All statistics correct as of December 1, 2025.

2025 Uzbekistan Pro League (Uzbek: Футбол бўйича 2025-йилги Ўзбекистон Про лигаси) was the 34th since its establishment in 1992.

The draw for the tournament, in which 6 teams take part, took place on March 11.

== Background ==
2025 participation of 6 teams from the season in Uzbekistan Pro League in approved. Compared to last season, the league increased the circle of the team that has separated 4/2, type 20 is held without.

Bukhara, Mash’al, Kokand 1912 and Shurtan are promoted to the 2025 Uzbekistan Super League.

In the 2024 season the club, which finished 8th in the Uzbek Pro League - Dustlik Tashkent was relegated to the lower division - First League.

== Venues ==
Team venues in the 2025 Uzbekistan Pro League

=== Round Staff and sponsors ===
Club	Coach	Captain	Wear manufacturer	Wear sponsor	Club sponsor
Aral	(Uzbekistan) Vadim Shodimatov	Obid Joʻraboyev			
Jaykhun	(Uzbekistan) Aybek Nurbaev	Aybek Sdikov			
Olimpik	(Uzbekistan) Artyom Petrosyan	Kirill Todorov			
Olimpik MobiUz	(Uzbekistan) Farkhad Nishanov	Samandar Muratbaev			
FarDU	(Uzbekistan) Sergey Lebedev	Abdukholiq Kurbanov			
Lokomotiv	(Australia) Mirko Jeličić	Anzur Ismailov			

=== Round Coach substitutions ===
Club	Old coach	Reason	Date	Table position	New coach	Appointed
Lokomotiv	(Uzbekistan) Grigoriy Kolosovskiy	Dissatisfaction with the results	June 26, 2025	2	(Australia) Mirko Jeličić	July 9, 2025
Olimpik	(Australia) Mirko Jeličić	Dissatisfaction with the results	July 4, 2025	6	(Uzbekistan) Artyom Petrosyan	July 10, 2025
FarDU	(Uzbekistan) Sergey Lebedev	Dissatisfaction with the results			(Uzbekistan) Shavkat Yusupov	

== League table ==
Pos	Team	Pld	W	D	L	GF	GA	GD	Pts	Qualification or relegation
1	Lokomotiv Tashkent (C, P)	20	12	5	3	37	15	+22	41	Promotion to Uzbekistan Super League
2	Aral Nukus	20	13	2	5	31	15	+16	41	Qualification for Super League play-off
3	Olympic MobiUz	20	12	3	5	35	19	+16	39	
4	FarDU	20	7	5	8	25	24	+1	26	
5	Jaykhun	20	4	3	13	19	47	−28	15	
6	Olympic (R)	20	3	0	17	13	40	−27	9	Relegation to 2026 Uzbekistan First League

Source: Uzbekistan Professional Football League
Rules for classification: 1) points; 2) head-to-head points; 3) head-to-head goal difference; 4) head-to-head away goals scored; 5) goal difference; 6) number of goals scored.
(C) Champions; (P) Promoted; (R) Relegated

=== Round 1 ===
3 April 2025 1	Aral	4–0	Jayxun	Nukus
	Qutiboyev 34'; Aliyev 54'; Farhodov 57'; Abdulhaqov 86'	Report		Stadium: NOPSTTM; Referee: Umidjon Nutfullayev

3 April 2025 2	Olimpik	2–3	Lokomotiv	Tashkent
	Muborakov 28', 56'	Report	Rašo 60'; Abrayev 85'; Zoirov 90+4'	Stadium: Doʻstlik

5 April 2025 3	Olimpik Mobiuz	0–0	FarDU	Tashkent
		Report		Stadium: Jar

=== Round 2 ===
12 April 2025 1	Jayxun	1–0	Olimpik	Nukus
	Mambetov 53'	Report		Stadium: NOPSTTM

12 April 2025 2	FarDU	1–2	Lokomotiv	Fargʻona
	Qodirov 27'	Report	Hakimov 19'; Shulaia 56'	Stadium: Istiqlol

13 April 2025 3	Aral	3–1	Olimpik Mobiuz	Nukus
	Abdulhaqov 24'; Rasulov 27'; Ismoilov 57'	Report	Rejabaliyev 8'	Stadium: NOPSTTM; Referee: Akobirxoʻja Shukrullayev

=== Round 3 ===
3 April 2025 1	Olimpik	1–2	Olimpik Mobiuz	Tashkent
	Fayzullayev 90+4'	Report	Raimov 47'; Tojiboyev 90+4'	Stadium: Doʻstlik; Referee: Maʼmurjon Ilhomov

18 April 2025 2	Lokomotiv	4–0	Jayxun	Tashkent
	Turopov 24'; Ismoilov 45+1'; Shulaia 56'; Zoirov 67'	Report		Stadium: Lokomotiv

20 April 2025 3	Aral	2–0	FarDU	Nukus
	Nomozov 40'; Abdulhaqov 88'	Report		Stadium: NOPSTTM; Referee: Rustam Choriyev

=== Round 4 ===
24 April 2025 1	Aral	0–1	Olimpik	Nukus
		Report	Bahodirov 43'	Stadium: NOPSTTM; Referee: Zokirjon Safoyev

26 April 2025 2	FarDU	1–0	Jayxun	Fargʻona
	Poʻlatov 16'	Report		Stadium: Istiqlol; Referee: Dias Galeyev

27 April 2025 3	Lokomotiv	0–1	Olimpik Mobiuz	Tashkent
		Report	Rejabaliyev 63'	Stadium: Doʻstlik

=== Round 5 ===
5 May 2025 1	Olimpik	2–1	FarDU	Tashkent Region
17.00	Muborakov 53'; Muborakov 59'	Report	Ayvazov 90+3'	Stadium: Doʻstlik; Referee: Xushnud Suyunboyev

6 May 2025 2	Jayxun	0–1	Olimpik MobiUz	Tashkent Region
17.30		Report	Raimov 48'	Stadium: NOPSTTM; Referee: Umidjon Nutfullayev

8 May 2025 3	Lokomotiv	2–0	Aral	Tashkent Region
19.00	Shulaia 58'; Ismoilov 87'	Report		Stadium: Doʻstlik; Referee: Asker Najafaliyev

=== Round 6 ===
18 May 2025 1	FarDU	0–1	Olimpik MobiUz	Fargʻona
17.00		Report	Fomin 17'	Stadium: Istiqlol; Referee: Akmal Rahimov

18 May 2025 2	Jayxun	0–0	Aral	Nukus
18.00		Report		Stadium: NOPSTTM

18 May 2025 3	Lokomotiv	2–0	Olimpik	Tashkent
19.00	Ismoilov 71'; Shulaia 75'	Report		Stadium: Doʻstlik

=== Round 7 ===
27 May 2025 1	Olimpik MobiUz	2–1	Aral	Tashkent
	Ibraimov 55'; Qurbonov 83'	Report	Qalmagambetov	Stadium: Jar

29 May 2025 2	Lokomotiv	0–0	FarDU	Olmaliq
		Report		Stadium: OKMK; Referee: Abdurashid Xudoyberganov

1 June 2025 3	Olimpik	1–2	Jayxun	Tashkent
	Fayzullayev 80'	Report	Qutiboyev 52'; Arazov 62'	Stadium: Doʻstlik; Referee: Nikita Mustafin

=== Round 8 ===
7 June 2025 1	Jayxun	1–1	Lokomotiv	Nukus
	Kuanishbayev 6'	Report	Zoirov 41'	Stadium: NOPSTTM

8 June 2025 2	FarDU	0–1	Aral	Fargʻona
		Report	Kuanishbayev 48'	Stadium: Oʻzbekiston; Referee: Alisher Toʻxtasinov

28 June 2025 3	Olimpik MobiUz	4–0	Olimpik	Olmaliq
	Tuxsanov 24'; Ibraimov 58'; Abdurashidov 78'; Maratov 85'	Report		Stadium: OKMK; Referee: Rinat Serazitdinov

=== Round 9 ===
11 June 2025 1	Olimpik	0–1	Aral	Tashkent Region
		Report	Abdulhaqov 6'	Stadium: Doʻstlik; Referee: Dias Galeyev

16 June 2025 2	Jayxun	1–1	FarDU	Nukus
	Qutiboyev 77'	Report	Abelfazov 10'	Stadium: NOPSTTM; Referee: Zokirjon Sapoyev

16 June 2025 3	Olimpik MobiUz	1–2	Lokomotiv	Tashkent
	Tuxsanov 56'	Report	Yoʻldoshev 10'; Zoirov 90+1'	Referee: Rustam Choriyev

=== Round 10 ===
21 June 2025 1	FarDU	1–0	Olimpik	Fargʻona
	Shermatov 5'	Report		Stadium: Istiqlol

23 June 2025 2	Olimpik MobiUz	3–0	Jayxun	Tashkent
	Rejabaliyev 13'; Ibraimov 36', 66'	Report		Stadium: Jar

24 June 2025 3	Aral	2–0	Lokomotiv	Nukus
	Nomozov 18'; Qalmagambetov 58'	Report		Stadium: NOPSTTM

=== Round 11 ===
11 August 2025 1	Olimpik Mobiuz	2–1	FarDU	Tashkent
	Tuxsanov 12', 15'	Report	Abduvaliyev 82'	Stadium: Jar; Referee: Akmal Rahimov

12 August 2025 2	Aral	2–1	Jayxun	Nukus
	Qalmagambetov 25'; Qutiboyev 33'	Report	Kuanishbayev 86'	Stadium: NOPSTTM

13 August 2025 3	Olimpik	0–2	Lokomotiv	Tashkent
		Report	Shodiboyev 13'; Ismoilov 51'	Stadium: Doʻstlik

=== Round 12 ===
18 August 2025 1	FarDU	0–2	Lokomotiv	Fargʻona
		Report	Shulaia 37'; Zoirov 47'	Stadium: FarDU

18 August 2025 2	Olimpik	3–1	Jayxun	Nukus
	Daryoboyev 49'; Kuanishbayev 68'; Norqobilov 90'	Report	Akramov 4'	Stadium: NOPSTTM; Referee: Rustam Choriyev

19 August 2025 3	Aral	2–1	Olimpik MobiUz	Nukus
	Abdulhaqov 75'; Ismoilov 80'	Report	Rejabaliyev 66'	Stadium: NOPSTTM

=== Round 13 ===
23 August 2025 1	Lokomotiv	5–0	Jayxun	Tashkent
	Shulaia 17'; Zoirov 25'; Arveladze 35'; Zoirov 65'; Shodiboyev 72'	Report		Stadium: Doʻstlik

25 August 2025 2	Olimpik	0–1	Olimpik Mobiuz	Tashkent
		Report	Raimov 79'	Stadium: Doʻstlik

26 August 2025 3	Aral	2–0	FarDU
	Qutiboyev 35'; Farhodov 90+5'	Report

=== Round 14 ===
14 September 2025 1	Aral	3–1	Olimpik	Nukus
	Abdulhaqov 15'; Kuanishbayev 46'; Farhodov 88'	Report	Tojiyev 90+5'	Stadium: NOPSTTM

15 September 2025 2	FarDU	5–2	Jayxun	Fargʻona
	Bashriddinov 20'; Oʻrinboyev 26', 68'; Qurbonov 53'; Umarjonov 87'	Report	Sultanmuratov 14'; Karilov 22'	Stadium: FarDU

16 September 2025 3	Lokomotiv	1–1	Olimpik MobiUz	Tashkent
	Zoirov 30'	Report	Ibraimov 4'	Stadium: Doʻstlik

=== Round 15 ===
23 September 2025 1	Olimpik	1–3	FarDU	Doʻstlik
	Akramov 85'	Report	Zokirov 13'; Abelfazov 42'; Bashriddinov 61'	Referee: Rinat Serazitdinov

24 September 2025 2	Jayxun	3–2	Olimpik Mobiuz	Nukus
	Qutiboyev 8'; Niyetullayev 36'; Kuanishbayev 61'	Report	Rahimov 56', 62'	Stadium: NOPSTTM; Referee: Toʻrabek Suyunov

26 September 2025 3	Lokomotiv	1–0	Aral	Tashkent
	Mahamatov 52'	Report		Stadium: Doʻstlik; Referee: Jasur Muxtorov

=== Round 16 ===
4 October 2025 1	FarDU	3–2	Olimpik MobiUz	Fargʻona
	Abelfazov 38', 51'; Oʻktamov 41'	Report	Maratov 17'; Rejabaliyev 61'	Stadium: FarDU; Referee: Temurbek Toʻxtasinov

5 October 2025 2	Jayxun	1–2	Aral	Nukus
	Karilov 55'	Report	Qutiboyev 69'; Qutiboyev 87'	Stadium: NOPSTTM; Referee: Sardor Mirodilov

5 October 2025 3	Lokomotiv	2–0	Olimpik	Tashkent
	Popović 4', 50'	Report		Stadium: Jar; Referee: Akmal Rahimov

=== Round 17 ===
16 October 2025 1	Olimpik	3–1	Jayxun	Tashkent
	Akramov 17'; Bahodirov 57'; Daminov 90+2'	Report	Sdikov 54'	Stadium: Doʻstlik; Referee: Nasibabonu Toshmuhamedova

18 October 2025 2	Lokomotiv	2–2	FarDU	Tashkent
	Shodiboyev 63', 68'	Report	Hojimatov 27'; Inomov 82'	Stadium: Doʻstlik; Referee: Alisher Toʻxtasinov

20 October 2025 3	Olimpik MobiUz	3–1	Aral	Tashkent
	Tuxsanov 50'; Rizaqulov 59'; Ibraimov 69'	Report	Ismoilov 66'	Stadium: Jar; Referee: Xushnud Suyunboyev

=== Round 18 ===
27 October 2025 1	FarDU	1–1	Aral	Fargʻona
	Bashriddinov 32'	Report	Farhodov 76'	Stadium: FarDU; Referee: Jasur Muxtorov

27 October 2025 2	Jayxun	2–5	Lokomotiv	Nukus
	Karilov 82'; Otajonov 83'	Report	Zoirov 4', 61', 94'; Popović 24'; Shodiboyev 37'	Stadium: NOPSTTM; Referee: Abdurashid Xudoyberganov

28 October 2025 3	Olimpik MobiUz	2–0	Olimpik	Tashkent
	Rashidov 5'; Hamidov 69'	Report		Stadium: Jar; Referee: Alisher Rahimqulov

=== Round 19 ===
3 November 2025 1	Olimpik	0–3	Aral	Tashkent
		Report	Qutiboyev 24'; Qalmagambetov 90+3', 90+5'	Stadium: Doʻstlik; Referee: Umidjon Rahimjonov

5 November 2025 2	Olimpik MobiUz	2–0	Lokomotiv	Tashkent
	Hamidov 51'	Report	Popović 33'	Stadium: Jar; Referee: Doston Rahmonov

6 November 2025 3	Jayxun	1–2	FarDU	Tashkent
	Kalmurzayev 69'	Report	Zokirov 36'; Oʻrinboyev 45+2'	Stadium: NOPSTTM; Referee: Dias Galeyev

=== Round 20 ===
9 November 2025 1	FarDU	3–0	Olimpik
		Texnik magʻlubiyat

9 November 2025 2	Olimpik MobiUz	4–0	Jayxun	Tashkent
	Fomin 19'; Ibraimov 31', 45+1'; Raimov 35'	Report		Stadium: Jar; Referee: Nayim Qosimov

9 November 2025 3	Aral	1–0	Lokomotiv	Tashkent
	Abdulhaqov 90'	Report		Stadium: NOPSTTM; Referee: Gʻayrat Joʻrayev

=== Results by games played ===
Team ╲ Round	1	2	3	4	5	6	7	8	9	10	11	12	13	14	15	16	17	18	19	20
Aral	W	W	W	W	L	D	L	W	W	W	W	W	W	W	W	W	L	D	W	W
Jayxun	L	W	L	L	L	D	W	D	D	L	L	L	L	L	W	L	L	L	L	L
Olimpik	L	L	L	W	W	L	L	L	L	L	L	W	L	L	L	L	W	L	L	L
Olimpik MobiUz	D	L	W	W	W	W	W	W	L	W	W	W	W	D	L	L	W	W	W	W
FarDU	D	L	L	W	L	W	D	L	D	W	L	L	L	W	W	W	D	D	W	W
Lokomotiv	W	W	W	L	W	W	D	D	W	L	D	W	W	D	W	W	D	W	L	L

Updated to match(es) played on December 1, 2025. Source: UzPFL
W = Win; D = Draw; L = Loss; P = Postponed

== Top goalscorers ==
As of 23 August 2025

Goals	Player	Country	Club
7	Muhriddin Zoirov	Uzbekistan	Lokomotiv
6	Akaki Shulaia	Georgia	Lokomotiv
5	Izzatullo Abdulhaqov	Uzbekistan	Aral
4	Anzur Ismailov	Uzbekistan	Lokomotiv
4	Javohir Muborakov	Uzbekistan	Olimpik
4	Nurlan Ibraimov	Uzbekistan	Olimpik MobiUz
4	Daler Tuxsanov	Uzbekistan	Olimpik MobiUz
4	Mayirbek Rejabaliyev	Uzbekistan	Olimpik MobiUz
3	Ruslan Qalmagambetov	Uzbekistan	Aral
3	Begis Kuanishbayev	Uzbekistan	Jaykhun
2	Muhammadali Namozov	Uzbekistan	Aral
2	Salamat Qutiboyev	Uzbekistan	Aral
2	Doniyor Ismoilov	Uzbekistan	Aral
2	Asadulla Qutiboyev	Uzbekistan	Jaykhun
2	Shodiyor Shodiboyev	Uzbekistan	Lokomotiv
2	Muhammadyusuf Fayzullayev	Uzbekistan	Olimpik
2	Muhammadali Raimov	Uzbekistan	Olimpik MobiUz
1	Zulpuqar Kuanishbayev	Uzbekistan	Aral
1	Aʼzam Aliyev	Uzbekistan	Aral
1	Bobur Farhodov	Uzbekistan	Aral
1	Muhriddin Rasulov	Uzbekistan	Aral
1	Rizo Ayvazov	Uzbekistan	FarDU
1	Sherzod Qodirov	Uzbekistan	FarDU
1	Shukurali Poʻlatov	Uzbekistan	FarDU
1	Jahongir Shermatov	Uzbekistan	FarDU
1	Ibodjon Abelfazov	Uzbekistan	FarDU
1	Bahodir Abduvaliyev	Uzbekistan	FarDU
1	Murod Mambetov	Uzbekistan	Jaykhun
1	Shuhrat Daryabayev	Uzbekistan	Jaykhun
1	Baxtiyar Arazov	Uzbekistan	Jaykhun
1	Abdumalik Norqobilov	Uzbekistan	Jaykhun
1	Momčilo Rašo	Montenegro	Lokomotiv
1	Quvonchbek Abrayev	Uzbekistan	Lokomotiv
1	Levan Arveladze	Georgia	Lokomotiv
1	Abdulloh Yoʻldoshev	Uzbekistan	Lokomotiv
1	Diyor Turopov	Uzbekistan	Lokomotiv
1	Jasur Hakimov	Uzbekistan	Lokomotiv
1	Ozodbek Qurbonov	Uzbekistan	Olimpik MobiUz
1	Diyorbek Tojiboyev	Uzbekistan	Olimpik MobiUz
1	Rustambek Fomin	Uzbekistan	Olimpik MobiUz
1	Abdulaziz Abdurashidov	Uzbekistan	Olimpik MobiUz
1	Ulugʻbek Maratov	Uzbekistan	Olimpik MobiUz
1	Jaʼfar Bahodirov	Uzbekistan	Olimpik
1	Behruz Akramov	Uzbekistan	Olimpik
