= Guilherme Guedes =

Guilherme Guedes may refer to:

- Guilherme Guedes (footballer, born 1999), Brazilian football left-back for Grêmio
- Guilherme Guedes (footballer, born 2002), Portuguese football midfielder for Vitória Guimarães
