= Levan Arveladze =

Georgian footballer

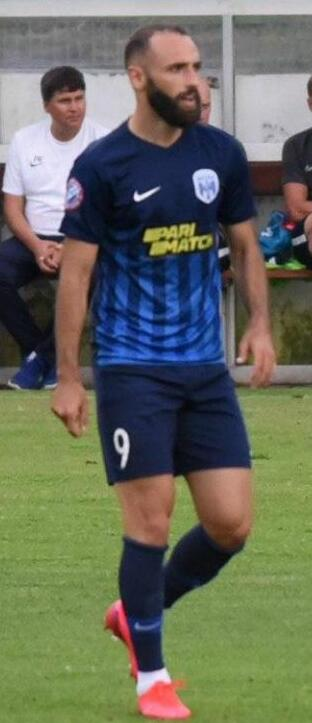

Personal information
- Full name: Levan Giviyovich Arveladze
- Date of birth: 6 April 1993 (age 33)
- Place of birth: Tbilisi, Georgia
- Height: 1.82 m (5 ft 11 1/2 in)
- Position: Midfielder

Youth career
- 2008–2011: Dnipro Dnipropetrovsk
- 2011–2013: Kryvbas Kryvyi Rih

Senior career*
Years	Team	Apps	(Gls)
2013–2014	Skala Stryi	30	(1)
2014	Ahrobiznes TSK Romny	2	(1)
2015–2016	Naftovyk-Ukrnafta Okhtyrka	46	(11)
2016–2018	Desna Chernihiv	41	(8)
2018–2019	Zorya Luhansk	29	(0)
2020–2021	Desna Chernihiv	41	(2)
2022	Torpedo Kutaisi	10	(0)
2023–2024	Andijon	46	(4)
2024–2025	Lokomotiv Tashkent	20	(1)
- * Club domestic league appearances and goals as of 12 November 2025

Levan Arveladze (Ukrainian: Леван Гівійович Арвеладзе; born 6 April 1993) is a Georgian footballer who plays as a defender.

== Career ==
Arveladze is a product of the FC Dnipro and FC Kryvbas youth sportive schools. He spent his career in clubs from various league, yet since 2014 plays in Severia region for FC Ahrobiznes TSK Romny, FC Naftovyk-Ukrnafta Okhtyrka.

=== Desna Chernihiv ===
In 2016, he moved to Desna Chernihiv, the main club in Chernihiv, here he won the award of the round 28 in Ukrainian First League in the season 2016–17.

=== Zorya Luhansk ===
On 2 February 2018, he signed pre-contract agreement with Ukrainian Premier League club Zorya Luhansk transferring to the Luhansk club on 1 July 2018, getting into the semifinal of the Ukrainian Cup.

=== Desna Chernihiv ===
In 2020 he signed again for Desna Chernihiv. With the club got into the Quarterfinals of the 2019-20 Ukrainian Cup. He helped Desna Chernihiv qualify for the first time in the history of the club for the 2020–21 Europa League third qualifying round. He left the club in April 2022.

=== Torpedo Kutaisi ===
On 7 April 2022, he moved to Torpedo Kutaisi in Erovnuli Liga. On 10 April, he made his debut against Gagra replacing Mate Tsintsadze.

=== Andijon ===
In February 2023 he moved to Andijon in Uzbekistan Super League with a contract of two years. In 2024 he won the Uzbekistan Cup in 2024.

=== Lokomotiv Tashkent ===
On 17 December 2024, Lokomotiv Tashkent announced the siging of Arveladze. On 23 August 2025, he scored against Jayhun Nukus at the Lokomotiv Stadium. In December 2025 his contract was ended and he was released by the club.

== Outside of professional football ==
In March 2022, during the Siege of Chernihiv, Arveladze, together with other former Desna players, raised money for the civilian population of the city.

== Honours ==
Lokomotiv Tashkent

- Uzbekistan Pro Leagueː 2025

Andijon

- Uzbekistan Cup: 2024

Torpedo Kutaisi

- Georgian Cup: 2022

Desna Chernihiv

- Ukrainian First League: 2017–18

Ahrobiznes TSK Romny

- Sumy Oblast Championship: 2014

Individual

- Best Player round 28 Ukrainian First League: 2016–17

== Career statistics ==
=== Club ===
As of match played 12 November 2025

Appearances and goals by club, season and competition
Club	Season	League			Cup		Europe		Other		Total	
Club	Season	Division	Apps	Goals	Apps	Goals	Apps	Goals	Apps	Goals	Apps	Goals
Skala Stryi	2013–14	Ukrainian Second League	30	1	1	0	0	0	0	0	31	1
Ahrobiznes TSK Romny	2014	Sumy Oblast Championship	2	1	0	0	0	0	0	0	2	1
Naftovyk-Ukrnafta Okhtyrka	2014–15	Ukrainian First League	11	4	0	0	0	0	0	0	11	4
Naftovyk-Ukrnafta Okhtyrka	2015–16	Ukrainian First League	16	1	1	0	0	0	0	0	17	1
Naftovyk-Ukrnafta Okhtyrka	2016–17	Ukrainian First League	19	6	2	1	0	0	0	0	21	7
Desna Chernihiv	2016–17	Ukrainian First League	12	4	0	0	0	0	0	0	12	4
Desna Chernihiv	2017–18	Ukrainian First League	29	4	3	0	0	0	2	2	34	6
Zorya Luhansk	2018–19	Ukrainian Premier League	22	0	2	0	0	0	0	0	24	0
Zorya Luhansk	2019–20	Ukrainian Premier League	7	0	0	0	3 (Note: three appearances in Europa League)	1	0	0	10	1
Desna Chernihiv	2019–20	Ukrainian Premier League	11	1	1	0	0	0	0	0	12	1
Desna Chernihiv	2020–21	Ukrainian Premier League	15	0	1	0	0	0	0	0	16	0
Desna Chernihiv	2021–22	Ukrainian Premier League	15	1	1	0	0	0	0	0	16	1
Torpedo Kutaisi	2022	Erovnuli Liga	10	0	0	0	0	0	0	0	10	0
Andijon	2023	Uzbekistan Super League	23	1	2	0	0	0	0	0	24	1
Andijon	2024	Uzbekistan Super League	23	3	7	0	0	0	0	0	30	3
Lokomotiv Tashkent	2025	Uzbekistan Pro League	20	1	3	1	0	0	0	0	23	2
Career total			265	30	23	2	3	1	2	2	299	34
