= Mirko Jeličić =

Australian football coach (born 1965)

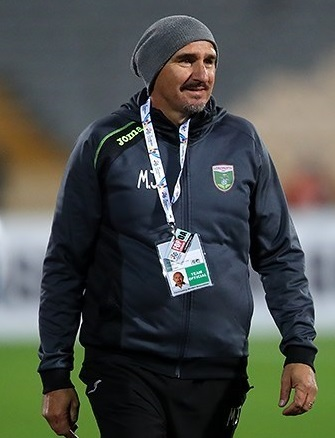

Personal information
- Date of birth: 16 May 1965 (age 61)
- Place of birth: Australia

Team information
- Current team: Lokomotiv Tashkent (manager)

Managerial career
- Years: Team
- 2000–2002: Perth Glory (assistant)
- 2002: China (assistant)
- 2009: Uzbekistan U-23
- 2009–2011: Uzbekistan (assistant)
- 2011–2012: BEC Tero Sasana (assistant)
- 2015: Lokomotiv Tashkent (assistant)
- 2015–2019: Lokomotiv Tashkent
- 2019: Uzbekistan (assistant)
- 2025: FC Olympic Tashkent
- 2025–: Lokomotiv Tashkent

Mirko Jeličić is an Australian football coach who is currently managing Uzbek club Lokomotiv Tashkent. He was coaching Cockburn City in the Western Australia State League Premier Division. Jeličić had previously worked as a fitness coach for Perth Glory in the Australian National Soccer League, during the reign of manager Bernd Stange. The club enjoyed its most successful period during this time. In 2001 Jelicic was appointed to the staff of the "Auckland Kingz " in New Zealand assisting with team preparation for their National League campaign. In 2002, he was invited by Bora Milutinovich to assist with injury management for China's World Cup campaign in South Korea.

Jeličić was appointed to be the coach of Cockburn City in 2003, the team finishing as runners up in the WA state league. In late 2003 he moved to work in Malaysia, acting as a fitness coach for Sabah FA.

He later moved to Uzbekistan to prepare them for their 2006 FIFA World Cup campaign, working under experienced English coach Bob Houghton. After an initial stint he remained after their failed World Cup campaign, also working with Uzbeki national league team Pakhtakor, achieving league and cup double. After a short stint with Singaporean team SAFFC, Jeličić returned to Uzbekistan, working with the National Team in preparation for the 2007 Asian Cup, under the guidance of Russian coach Valeri Kuzmyich Nepomniachi (Uzbekistan reaching the quarter finals) and also with Pakhtakor who again won the double.

In early 2008 Jeličić was appointed, for a second time, as coach of Cockburn City. He left the club in May 2009 to take on a role with the Uzbekistan under-20 World Cup side. Also preparing the National Team for the 2011 Asian Championship (Semi Finalists).

In 2011, his ex-coworker Peter Butler during SAFFC period invited him to work at BEC Tero Sasana F.C. a top club in Thailand Premier League. In 2012, he continued his association with Bec Terro and in September began work with Sven Goran Erikkson. Jelicic renewed his association with Uzbekistan football in 2015, returning to work with Lokomotiv Tashkent. He was appointed head coach following the sacking of Vadim Abramov in October. In 2016 under the guidance of Jelicic the club reached the quarter finals of the Asian Champions League and won the domestic (league /cup) double. The club repeated their league/cup double the following year, the first time a club has been able to do this in Uzbekistan.

In 2025, Jeličić was appointed manager at FC Olympic Tashkent.

== Honours ==
Lokomotiv Tashkent

- Uzbek League (1): 2016
- Uzbek Cup (1): 2016
- Uzbekistan Super Cup (1): 2015
