= FC Chigʻatoy =

Football club of Tashkent Region

Chigʻatoy
- Founded: 2018
- Ground: grass
- Coach: Dmitry Kim
- League: 2026 Uzbekistan First League

Chigʻatoy is a football club of Tashkent Region.

== History ==
Founded in 2018. In the 2019 Uzbekistan Pro-B League, played 28 matches and took 6th place with 30 points. In the qualifying matches of the 2019 Uzbekistan Cup, lost to the club from Yashnobad with a score of 0:2. In the 2020 Uzbekistan First League, scored 16 points in 12 matches and took 4th place. In the first qualifying round of the 2021 Uzbekistan Cup, lost to Neftgazmontaj in a penalty shootout. In the second qualifying match, they lost to Zamin and Gijduvan with a score of 1–3. In the first qualifying round of the 2023 Uzbekistan Cup, lost to the Nurafshan-Bukhara. In the 2023 Uzbekistan Championship Cup scored 7 points in Group A. In the 2020 Uzbekistan First League, it scored 37 points in 22 matches and took 6th place. At the 2024 Uzbekistan Cup, the team suffered consecutive defeats in Group E and did not receive points. In the final of the 2023 Independence Cup, organized by Tashkent Football Association, won Bunyodkor-Farm for the first time.

== Squad ==
As of March 1, 2025

No.	Footballer	Year of birth	Contract period
1	Nikita Mixaylov	2007	2026
3	Sanjarbek Odilbekov	2001	2026
5	Maksim Borshev	2007	2026
6	Javlon Yoʻldoshev	2005	2026
7	Rahmatillo Tillayev	2006	2026
8	Lazizbek Ashurov	2005	2026
10	Izzatilla Yusupov	2006	2026
11	Shahriyor Andaqulov	2005	2026
12	Husan Akmuratov	2003	2026
13	Diyorbek Jumayev	2008	2026
15	Abdugʻani Joʻrayev	2006	2026
16	Abdulla Tursunboyev	2006	2026
17	Jasur Yoʻldoshev	2008	2026
18	Amirbek Komilov	2004	2026
19	Ravon Havasov	2004	2026
20	Xurshidbek Fayziyev	2006	2026
21	Samandar Iskandarov	2007	2026
22	Asadxoʻja Ahmedxoʻjayev	2008	2026
23	Azamat Abdurashidov	2003	2026
24	Nazar Nikulshin	2007	2026
28	Hojiakbar Qodirov	2007	2026
45	Ozodbek Mardonov	2007	2026
70	Akbarjon Boqijonov	2007	2026
74	Samandar Zafarov	2006	2026
77	Ulugʻbek Javgarov	2006	2026
