= Guilherme Guedes (footballer, born 1999) =

Brazilian footballer

Personal information
- Full name: Guilherme Alecsander Machado Guedes
- Date of birth: 18 May 1999 (age 27)
- Place of birth: Porto Alegre, Brazil
- Height: 1.77 m (5 ft 10 in)
- Position: Left-back

Team information
- Current team: Dynamo Brest
- Number: 36

Youth career
- Grêmio

Senior career*
Years	Team	Apps	(Gls)
2018–2024	Grêmio	18	(1)
2019	→ Ponte Preta (loan)	12	(0)
2022	→ Chapecoense (loan)	5	(0)
2023	→ Juventude (loan)	9	(0)
2023	→ Ypiranga (loan)	5	(0)
2024	→ América-RN (loan)	20	(1)
2025	Navbahor	25	(2)
2026	Toktogul	0	(0)
2026–	Dynamo Brest	8	(0)

International career^{‡}
2018	Brazil U20	1	(0)
- * Club domestic league appearances and goals as of 6 July 2026 ‡ National team caps and goals as of 22 March 2018

Guilherme Alecsander Machado Guedes (born 18 May 1999), known as Guilherme Guedes, is a Brazilian professional footballer who plays as a left-back for Belarusian Premier League club Dynamo Brest.

== Club career ==
On 11 January 2025, he signed a contract with the Uzbekistan Super League club Navbahor Namangan.

== Career statistics ==
=== Club ===
As of 25 November 2021

Appearances and goals by club, season and competition
Club	Season	League			State League		Cup		Continental		Other		Total	
Club	Season	Division	Apps	Goals	Apps	Goals	Apps	Goals	Apps	Goals	Apps	Goals	Apps	Goals
Grêmio	2018	Série A	1	0	3 (Note: Appearances in the Campeonato Gaúcho)	0	0	0	—		—		4	0
Grêmio	2019	Série A	0	0	0	0	0	0	—		—		0	0
Grêmio	2020	Série A	0	0	5	0	0	0	0	0	—		5	0
Grêmio	2021	Série A	4	1	0	0	1	0	0	0	—		5	1
Grêmio	Total		5	1	8	0	1	0	0	0	0	0	14	1
Ponte Preta (loan)	2019	Série B	12	0	—		—		—		—		12	0
Career total			17	1	8	0	1	0	0	0	0	0	26	1

== Honours ==
Grêmio

- Campeonato Gaúcho: 2020, 2021, 2022
- Recopa Gaúcha: 2021
