= FC Olympic Tashkent =

Uzbek association football club

- Full name: Football Club Olympic Tashkent
- Founded: 2021
- Dissolved: 2025; 1 year ago
- Ground: Jar Stadium; Tashkent
- Capacity: 12,000
- Manager: Mirko Jeličić
- League: Uzbekistan Super League
- 2024: 12th of 14
Home colours	Away colours

FC Olympic was an Uzbek professional football club in Tashkent.

== History ==
Olympic was founded in 2021 at the initiative of Uzbekistan National Olympic Committee and the team successfully completed preparations for Paris-2024 Olympic Games. In 2021, the team took part in the Uzbekistan Pro League for the first time and finished third in the first season. The club won its first victory in professional football in 2021. On March 28, the club beat Oqtepa with score 2–1 at home. On December 2, 2021, played for the Uzbek Super League against Mashal Mubarak, who took twelfth place in the Super League. Won the match with score 3–1 and were promoted to Super League. In its first season, reached the quarterfinals of Uzbekistan Cup and lost to Pakhtakor with score 0:1. From 2022 to 2024, participated in the Uzbek Super League. Participated in the Pro League in 2025 season. The club was suspended due to financial difficulties. In 2026 season, a new club "Respublika FA" was created on its basis.

=== Domestic history ===
Season	League									Uzbek Cup	Top goalscorer		Manager
Season	Div.	Pos.	Pl.	W	D	L	GS	GA	P	Uzbek Cup	Name	League	Manager
2021	2nd	3rd											(Uzbekistan) T.Kopadze
2022	1st	6th								Round of 16			(Uzbekistan) T.Kopadze
2023	1st	9th											
2024	1st	12th											
2025	2nd	3rd											
2026	2nd												

The club's kit supplier is Nike and shirt sponsor is Trastbank. The football club was established by National Olympic Committee of Uzbekistan in order to keep young generation in top level as a players farm, academy. Address of FK Olympic is Shaykhontohur district, Olmazor street 6 in Tashkent city. FK Olympic is also supplying Uzbekistan national under-23 football team with its young players.

== Honours ==
=== Domestic ===
- Uzbekistan Pro League
  - Third place (1): 2021
