= FC FarDU =

FarDU
- Full name: Fergana State University Football Club in Uzbek Fargʻona davlat universiteti futbol klubi
- Nickname: The Students
- Founded: 2024
- Ground: Fergana Stadium
- Capacity: 3,064
- Owner: Fergana State University
- Chairman: Bahodirjon Shermuhammadov
- Manager: Shavkat Yusupov
- League: Uzbekistan Pro League

FarDU is a professional football club located in Fergana and associated with Fergana State University. The club was formed in 2024. As of 2024, it competes in Uzbekistan First League and starting in 2025, it will participate in the Pro League competitions.

== History ==
The professional formation of FarDU football club happened in 2024. Prior to this, the club was actively participating, but it was only competing at an amateur level in the Fergana regional championship of Uzbekistan Second League.

In the 2024 season, the club participated in Uzbekistan First League and finished in third place at the end of the season. Ahead of the 2025 season, UzPFL confirmed that the club met the licensing requirements and would take part in the 2025 Uzbekistan Pro League tournament. As a result of participating in the Uzbekistan Pro League, FarDU became the first professional higher education team to take part in professional tournaments in Uzbekistan.
