= FC Jaykhun =

Jaykhun
- Full name: Jaykhun Football Club
- Founded: 2022
- Ground: Nukus Stadium
- Capacity: 3,500
- Owner: Karakalpak government
- President: Muratbay Abdumuratov
- Head coach: Aybek Nurbayev
- League: Uzbekistan Pro League

Jaykhun (Uzbek: Jayxun) is a professional association football club in Karakalpakstan, Uzbekistan The club was formed in 2022. As of 2025 it competes in Pro League competitions.

== History ==
From 2022 to 2024 the association participated in Uzbekistan First League. Since 2025, the association participates in Uzbekistan Pro League.

== Current Squad ==
As of April 6, 2026

Note: Flags indicate national team as defined under FIFA eligibility rules; some limited exceptions apply. Players may hold more than one non-FIFA nationality.

No.	Pos.	Nation	Player
13	GK	UZB	Ulugʻbek Bekbosinov
2	DF	UZB	Asadbek Mustafoqulov
4	DF	UZB	Allayar Maratov
5	DF	UZB	Rahman Mamutov
6	MF	UZB	Allayar Qalillayev
7	MF	UZB	Bahadir Sultamuratov
8	FW	UZB	Shuhrat Daryabayev
9	FW	UZB	Shohruh Muratbayev
10	MF	UZB	Aybek Sdikov
11	MF	UZB	Sardorbek Xidirboyev
14	DF	UZB	Asadbek Esemuratov
15	DF	UZB	Nurdaulet Tleubayev
17	DF	UZB	Rashid Arazov

No.	Pos.	Nation	Player
18	DF	UZB	Zafarbek Abdurasulov
19	DF	UZB	Baurjan Keunimjayev
21	GK	UZB	Jasurbek Umrzoqov
22	MF	UZB	Miyribek Kalmurzayev
23	MF	UZB	Asadulla Qutiboyev
28	MF	UZB	Agabek Ibraimov
37	MF	UZB	Jasurbek Otajonov
44	DF	UZB	Abdusalom Nuriddinov
55	DF	UZB	Shukurjon Rustamjonov
68	MF	UZB	Otajon Niyozmetov
79	MF	UZB	Umidjon Karilov
99	GK	UZB	Xoʻjamberdi Shonazarov
