= 2021 Uzbekistan Super League =

Twenty-eighth season of top level football in Uzbekistan

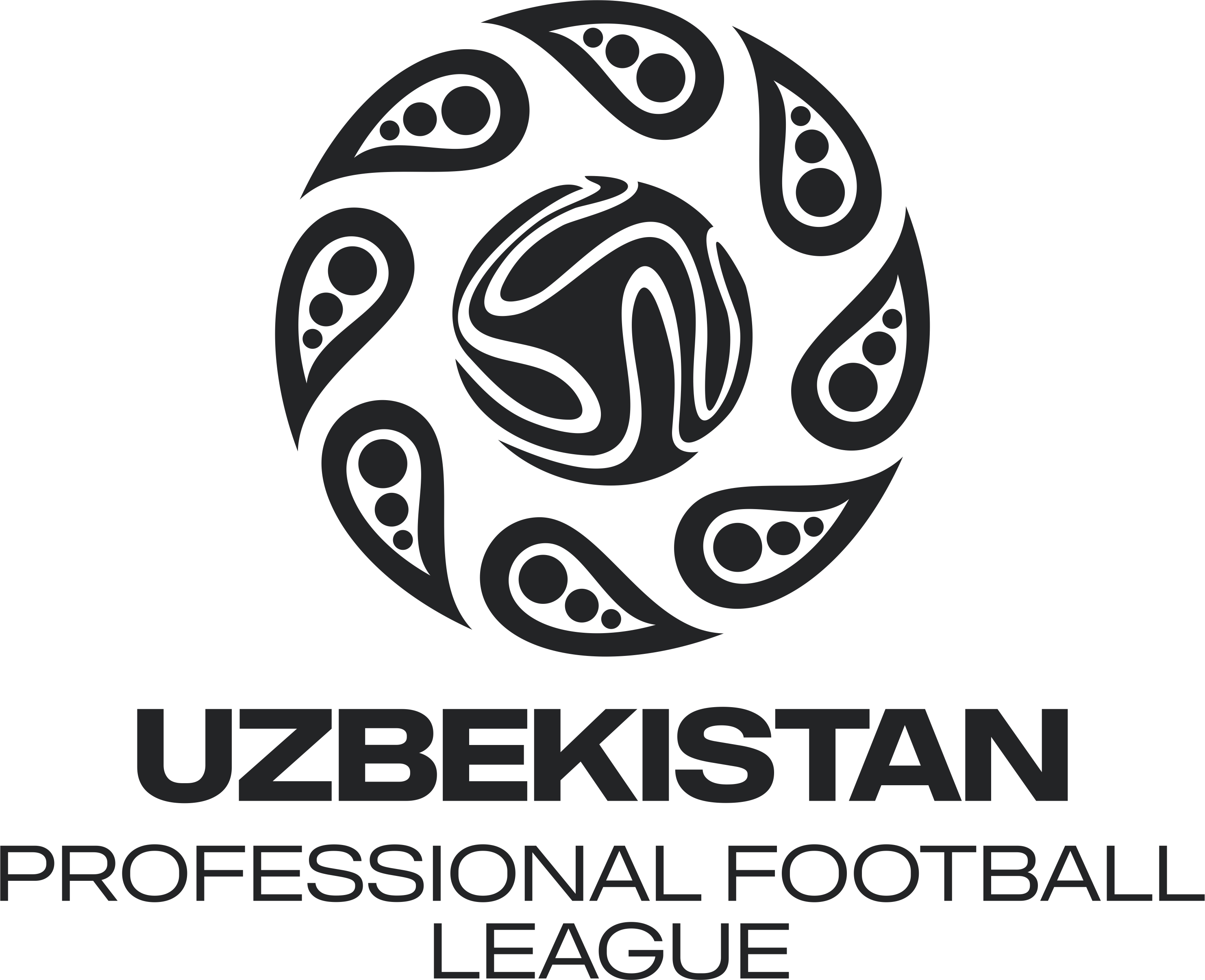
- Season: 2021
- Dates: 9 March — 27 November
- Champions: Pakhtakor
- Matches: 132
- Goals: 288 (2.18 per match)
- Top goalscorer: Dragan Ćeran (16)
- Biggest home win: Pakhtakor 5–0 Surkhon (6 November 2021)
- Biggest away win: Surkhon 1–5 Bunyodkor (4 July 2021)
- Highest scoring: Surkhon 1–5 Bunyodkor (4 July 2021)
- Longest winning run: Pakhtakor
- Longest winless run: Turon
- Longest losing run: Turon
- All statistics correct as of 21 September 2021.

The 2021 Uzbekistan Super League (in Uzbek: Футбол бўйича 2021-йилги Ўзбекистон Суперлигаси; known as the Coca-Cola Uzbekistan Super League for sponsorship reasons) is the 30th season of top-level football in Uzbekistan since its establishment on 1992. Pakhtakor Tashkent were the defending champions from the 2020 campaign.

== Teams ==
Location of teams in 2021 Uzbekistan Super League

Club	Coach	Location	Stadium	Capacity	Kit sponsor	Shirt sponsor
AGMK	(Uzbekistan) Mirjalol Qosimov	Olmaliq	AGMK Stadium	12,000	(Germany) Jako	Almalyk Mining and Metallurgical Combine
Andijan	(Uzbekistan) Otabek Gulomkhojaev	Andijan	Soghlom Avlod Stadium	18,360	(Chile) D&D Collection	Makro Farm Andijan
Bunyodkor	(Uzbekistan) Shukhrat Maqsudov	Tashkent	Milliy Stadium	34,000	(Germany) Jako	Uzbekneftegaz
Kokand 1912	(Uzbekistan) Bakhtiyor Ashurmatov	Kokand	Markaziy Stadium	10,500	(Germany) Jako	Bazis
Lokomotiv	(Portugal) Micael Sequeira	Tashkent	Lokomotiv Stadium	8,000	(Spain) Joma	Orient Finance Bank, Uztelecom ^{1}, Drivers Village ^{1}
Mash'al	(Russia) Alexander Khomyakov	Muborak	Bahrom Vafoev Stadium	10,000	(Germany) Saller	Uzbekneftegaz
Metallurg	(Spain) Luisma Hernández	Bekabad	Metallurg Bekabad Stadium	15,000	(Germany) Adidas	Uzbekistan Metallurgy Combinat
Nasaf	(Uzbekistan) Ruziqul Berdiyev	Qarshi	Markaziy Stadium	16,000	(Germany) Adidas	Uzbekistan GTL SGCC, ENTER Engineering^{1}
Navbahor	(Uzbekistan) Numon Khasanov	Namangan	Markaziy Stadium	22,000	(Germany) Jako	Namangan City
Pakhtakor	(Netherlands) Pieter Huistra	Tashkent	Central Stadium	35,000	(Germany) Adidas	
Qizilqum	(Uzbekistan) Hamidjon Aktamov	Navoiy	Yoshlar Stadium	12,500	(Germany) Jako	Navoi Mining and Metallurgy Combinat
Sogdiana	(Uzbekistan) Ulugbek Bakayev	Jizzakh	Sogdiana Stadium	11,650	(Spain) Joma	BMB Energo
Surkhon	(Uzbekistan) Rifat Akramkhujaev	Termez	Alpamish Stadium	6,000	(Germany) Adidas	Uzbekgidrenergo
Turon	(Poland) Bogusław Baniak	Yaypan	Uzbekistan Stadium	5,000	(Germany) Jako	Fitogether, Aloqabank, Turon World Cooperation^{1}

=== Managerial changes ===
Team	Outgoing manager	Manner of departure	Date of vacancy	Position in table	Replaced by	Date of appointment	Ref.
Bunyodkor	(Uzbekistan) Vadim Abramov			Preseason	(Uzbekistan) Shukhrat Maqsudov		
Lokomotiv Tashkent	(Uzbekistan) Timur Kapadze			Preseason	(Portugal) Micael Sequeira	7 January 2021	
Mash'al Mubarek	(Uzbekistan) Dilyaver Vaniyev			Preseason	(Russia) Alexander Khomyakov		
Pakhtakor Tashkent	(Georgia (country)) Shota Arveladze	Resigned	22 December 2020	Preseason	(Netherlands) Pieter Huistra	6 January 2021	
Qizilqum	(Uzbekistan) Hamidjon Aktamov		3 June 2020	10th	(Turkmenistan) Täçmyrat Agamyradow	4 June 2020	
Qizilqum	(Turkmenistan) Täçmyrat Agamyradow		26 August 2020	5th	(Uzbekistan) Hamidjon Aktamov	27 August 2020	

== Foreign players ==
The number of foreign players is restricted to five per USL team. A team can use only five foreign players on the field in each game.

Club	Player 1	Player 2	Player 3	Player 4	AFC players	Naturalized Players	Former players
AGMK	(Cape Verde) **Alvin Fortes**	(Italy) Martin Boakye	(Serbia) **Jovan Đokić**	(Ukraine) Oleksandr Kasyan			
Andijan	(Belarus) Vasiliy Sovpel	(Belarus) Pavel Zabelin	(Bulgaria) Plamen Dimov	(Kazakhstan) **Vladislav Vasilyev**			(Mexico) **Marco Bueno** (Kyrgyzstan) **Edgar Bernhardt** (Italy) Martin Boakye
Bunyodkor	(Nigeria) Ibrahim Tomiwa	(Kyrgyzstan) **Odiljon Abdurakhmanov**			(Tajikistan) **Davron Ergashev**		
Kokand 1912	(Ivory Coast) Yacouba Bamba	(Serbia) Ivan Josović	(Serbia) Slavko Lukić				
Lokomotiv Tashkent	(Georgia (country)) **Kakhi Makharadze**	(Nigeria) Samuel Opeh					(Spain) Diego Bardanca
Mash'al Mubarek	(Nigeria) Michael Ibe	(Nigeria) **Ifeanyi Ifeanyi**	(Nigeria) Samuel Chigozie Ononiwu	(Nigeria) Godwin Chika Okwara			(Nigeria) Ukeme Williams
Metallurg Bekabad							(Russia) Andrey Shipilov (Russia) **Yevgeni Makeyev** (Ukraine) Yevhen Chumak
Nasaf	(Serbia) Marko Stanojević	(Serbia) **Andrija Kaludjerović**					
Navbahor Namangan	(Brazil) Guttiner	(North Macedonia) **Bojan Najdenov**	(Russia) Ivan Solovyov	(Serbia) Bojan Ciger	(Tajikistan) **Ehson Panjshanbe**	(Russia) → (Uzbekistan) **Igor Golban**	(Serbia) Marko Putinčanin (Serbia) Nikola Tasić (Serbia) Slaviša Stojanović
Pakhtakor Tashkent	(Serbia) Dragan Ćeran	(Serbia) Bojan Matić					(Switzerland) **Eren Derdiyok**
Qizilqum Zarafshon	(Georgia (country)) **Mate Vatsadze**	(Georgia (country)) **Elgujja Grigalashvili**	(Georgia (country)) Giorgi Kukhianidze	(Russia) Oleg Tolmasov			(Tajikistan) **Jahongir Ergashev**
Sogdiana Jizzakh	(Serbia) Luka Čermelj	(Serbia) Marko Kolaković	(Serbia) Milan Mitrović	(Serbia) Darko Stanojević			(Turkmenistan) **Arslanmyrat Amanow**
Surkhon Termez	(Serbia) Vladimir Bubanja						
Turon	(Serbia) Siniša Babić	(Serbia) Dajan Ponjević	(South Korea) Kim Bo-yong		(Tajikistan) **Firdavs Chakalov**	(Belarus) → (Uzbekistan) Uladzislaw Kasmynin	(Ghana) Kwame Karikari (Tajikistan) **Umarjon Sharipov**

In bold: Players that have been capped for their national team.

== League table ==
Pos	Team	Pld	W	D	L	GF	GA	GD	Pts	Qualification or relegation
1	Pakhtakor (C)	26	19	3	4	51	18	+33	60	Qualification to the AFC Champions League group stage
2	Sogdiana	26	12	11	3	28	15	+13	47 (Note: Sogdiana second on head-to-head points : Sogdiana 4; AGMK 1)	Qualification to the 2022 AFC Cup group stage (Note: Sogdiana are the standby team for the AFC Cup, should Nasaf advance to the AFC Champions League group stage. As Nasaf managed to qualify for the AFC Champions League group stage, Sogdiana's qualification in the AFC Cup was granted.)
3	AGMK	26	13	8	5	34	25	+9	47	
4	Nasaf	26	13	6	7	42	24	+18	45	Qualification to the AFC Champions League preliminary round (Note: Nasaf qualified to the AFC Champions League as 2021 Uzbekistan Cup champions.)
5	Bunyodkor	26	13	6	7	43	30	+13	45	
6	Navbahor	26	10	9	7	23	19	+4	39	
7	Lokomotiv	26	11	6	9	37	32	+5	39	
8	Kokand 1912	26	9	9	8	37	36	+1	36	
9	Qizilqum	26	7	10	9	26	29	−3	31	
10	Surkhon	26	7	4	15	17	43	−26	25	
11	Metallurg	26	8	1	17	22	35	−13	25	
12	Mash'al (R)	26	5	8	13	21	35	−14	23	Relegation play off Uzbekistan Pro League
13	Andijon (R)	26	4	7	15	22	41	−19	19	Relegation to Uzbekistan Pro League
14	Turon (R)	26	3	8	15	16	37	−21	17	Relegation to Uzbekistan Pro League

Source: Uzbekistan Professional Football League
Rules for classification: 1) points; 2) head-to-head points; 3) head-to-head goal difference; 4) head-to-head away goals scored; 5) goal difference; 6) number of goals scored.
(C) Champions; (R) Relegated

=== Round 1 ===
9 March 2021 1	Navbahor	0–1	Soʻgʻdiyona	Namangan
UZT (UTC+5)		Report	Norxonov 35'	Stadium: Navbahor; Referee: Akobirxoʻja Shukurullayev

9 March 2021 2	AGMK	2–1	Lokomotiv	Olmaliq
UZT (UTC+5)	Fortes 3'; Kasyan 75'	Report	Qodirqulov 36'	Stadium: OKMK; Referee: Shavkat Nasibullayev

10 March 2021 3	Bunyodkor	1–0	Mashʼal	Toshkent
UZT (UTC+5)	Tomiva 49'	Report		Stadium: Bunyodkor; Referee: Rustam Lutfullin

10 March 2021 4	Turon	1–0	Kokand 1912	Yaypan
UZT (UTC+5)	Hakimov 50'	Report	Meliyev 59'; Xolmuhammedov 64'	Stadium: Oʻzbekiston

10 March 2021 5	Nasaf	2–3	Paxtakor	Qarshi
UZT (UTC+5)	Komilov 35'; Yoʻldoshev 61'	Report	Rashidov 72'; Mozgovoy 81' (o.g.); Yoʻldoshev 87'	Stadium: Qarshi; Referee: Ilgiz Tantashev

11 March 2021 6	Surxon	1–0	Metallurg	Termiz
UZT (UTC+5)	Yoqubov 90+1'	Report		Stadium: Alpomish; Referee: Elyor Tursunov

11 March 2021 7	Qizilqum	1–0	Andijon	Navoiy
UZT (UTC+5)	Kilichev 35'	Report		Stadium: Yoshlar; Referee: Firdavs Norsafarov

=== Round 2 ===
14 March 2021 1	Lokomotiv	1–2	Navbahor	Toshkent
UZT (UTC+5)	Gʻulomov 36'	Report	Ahmedov 13'; Panjshanbe 75'	Stadium: Lokomotiv

14 March 2021 2	Soʻgʻdiyona	2–1	Turon	Jizzakh
UZT (UTC+5)	Norxonov 53'	Report		Stadium: Jizzax FA; Referee: Viktor Serazitdinov

14 March 2021 3	Nasaf	1–1	AGMK	Qarshi
UZT (UTC+5)	Norchayev 7'	Report	Fortes 84'	Stadium: Qarshi; Referee: Ahrol Risqullayev

15 March 2021 4	Kokand 1912	0–0	Qizilqum	Kokand
UZT (UTC+5)		Report		Stadium: Markaziy; Referee: Rahimbek Karimov

15 March 2021 5	Paxtakor	3–0	Mashʼal	Qarshi
UZT (UTC+5)	Sayfiyev 9'; Ćeran 36'; Rashidov 59'	Report		Stadium: Qarshi; Referee: Akobirxoʻja Shukurullayev

16 March 2021 6	Andijon	1–0	Surxon	Andijon
UZT (UTC+5)	Ismoilov 1'	Report		Stadium: Bobur; Referee: Vadim Agishev

16 March 2021 7	Metallurg	1–0	Bunyodkor	Bekobod
UZT (UTC+5)	Nurmatov 5'	Report		Stadium: Metallurg; Referee: Ilgiz Tantashev

=== Round 3 ===
18 March 2021 1	Turon	2–2	Lokomotiv	Yaypan
UZT (UTC+5)	Ponjević 4'; Kasminin 11'	Report	Siddiqov 16'; Abduxoliqov 69'	Stadium: Oʻzbekiston; Referee: Ilgiz Tantashev

18 March 2021 2	AGMK	0–3	Paxtakor	Olmaliq
UZT (UTC+5)		Report	Turgʻunboyev 27'; Derdiyok 33'; Yoʻldoshev 90+1'	Stadium: OKMK; Referee: Vadim Agishev

19 March 2021 3	Qizilqum	1–1	Soʻgʻdiyona	Navoiy
UZT (UTC+5)	Mustafoyev 72'	Report	Shayqulov 53'	Stadium: Yoshlar; Referee: Shavkat Nasibullayev

19 March 2021 4	Navbahor	0–0	Nasaf	Namangan
UZT (UTC+5)		Report		Stadium: Navbahor; Referee: Rahimbek Karimov

20 March 2021 5	Surxon	1–1	Kokand 1912	Termiz
UZT (UTC+5)	Gʻofurov 77'	Report	Xolmuhammedov 53'	Stadium: Alpomish; Referee: Rustam Lutfullin

20 March 2021 6	Mashʼal	2–1	Metallurg	Qarshi
UZT (UTC+5)	Ubaydullayev 29'; Qoʻziyev 85'	Report	Tojiyev 87'	Stadium: Bahrom Vafoyev; Referee: Ahrol Risqullayev

20 March 2021 7	Bunyodkor	3–1	Andijon	Toshkent
UZT (UTC+5)	Erkinov 3'; Gʻiyosov 62'; Mirahmadov 85'	Report	Ismonaliyev 76'	Stadium: Bunyodkor; Referee: Firdavs Norsafarov

=== Round 4 ===
1 April 2021 1	Andijon	1–1	Mashʼal	Andijon
UZT (UTC+5)	Jaloliddinov 35'	Report	Chigozie 21'	Stadium: Bobur; Referee: Zokir Qodirov

1 April 2021 2	Soʻgʻdiyona	2–1	Surxon	Jizzakh
UZT (UTC+5)	Norxonov 59', 90+5'	Report	Toshpoʻlatov 45+2'	Stadium: Soʻgʻdiyona; Referee: Asker Najafaliyev

2 April 2021 3	Kokand 1912	0–0	Bunyodkor	Kokand
UZT (UTC+5)		Report		Stadium: Markaziy; Referee: Shavkat Nasibullayev

2 April 2021 4	Paxtakor	2–1	Metallurg	Toshkent
UZT (UTC+5)	Derdiyok 23'; Muhiddinov 37'	Report	Abdullayev 45+3'	Stadium: Paxtakor; Referee: Rustam Lutfullin

2 April 2021 5	AGMK	2–1	Navbahor	Olmaliq
UZT (UTC+5)	Tursunov 26'; Gadoyev 72'	Report	Stojanović 44'	Stadium: OKMK; Referee: Akobirxoʻja Shukurullayev

3 April 2021 6	Lokomotiv	1–1	Qizilqum	Toshkent
UZT (UTC+5)	Turopov 72'	Report	Hasanov 36'	Stadium: Lokomotiv; Referee: Elyor Tursunov

3 April 2021 7	Nasaf	4–0	Turon	Qarshi
UZT (UTC+5)	Rahmatov 36'; Stanojević 51'; Nasrullayev 80'; Norchayev 86'	Report		Stadium: Qarshi; Referee: Vadim Agishev

=== Round 5 ===
7 April 2021 1	Navbahor	1–2	Paxtakor	Namangan
UZT (UTC+5)	Isoqjonov 71'	Report	Ćeran 40', 90'	Stadium: Navbahor; Referee: Firdavs Norsafarov

8 April 2021 2	Bunyodkor	2–2	Soʻgʻdiyona	Toshkent
UZT (UTC+5)	Toʻxtasinov 42'; Gʻiyosov 45+2'	Report	Norxonov 17'; Noʻmonov 44'	Stadium: Bunyodkor; Referee: Ilgiz Tantashev

8 April 2021 3	Metallurg	2–0	Andijon	Bekobod
UZT (UTC+5)	Andreyev 66'; Toshqoʻziyev 71'	Report		Stadium: Metallurg; Referee: Shavkat Nasibullayev

9 April 2021 4	Surxon	0–1	Lokomotiv	Termiz
UZT (UTC+5)		Report	Turopov 10'	Stadium: Alpomish; Referee: Akobirxoʻja Shukurullayev

9 April 2021 5	Mashʼal	0–2	Kokand 1912	Gʻuzor
UZT (UTC+5)		Report	Meliyev 53'; Norbekov 78'	Stadium: Bahrom Vafoyev; Referee: Vadim Agishev

10 April 2021 6	Qizilqum	1–2	Nasaf	Navoiy
UZT (UTC+5)	Kilichev 15'	Report	Stanojević 2', 82'	Stadium: Yoshlar; Referee: Rustam Lutfullin

10 April 2021 7	Turon	0–1	AGMK	Yaypan
UZT (UTC+5)		Report	Gadoyev 69'	Stadium: Oʻzbekiston; Referee: Firdavs Norsafarov

=== Round 6 ===
15 April 2021 1	Kokand 1912	0–1	Metallurg	Kokand
UZT (UTC+5)		Report	Qutiboyev 90+3'	Stadium: Markaziy; Referee: Asker Najafaliyev

15 April 2021 2	Nasaf	6–0	Surxon	Yaypan
UZT (UTC+5)	Norchayev 38'; Mozgovoy 49', 80'; Stanojević 52'; Nasrullayev 60'; Turdialiyev 87'	Report		Stadium: Oʻzbekiston; Referee: Gʻayrat Joʻrayev

15 April 2021 3	Soʻgʻdiyona	2–2	Mashʼal	Jizzakh
UZT (UTC+5)	Hasanov 20'; Norxonov 25'	Report	Hasanov 58' (o.g.); Čermelj 90+2' (o.g.)	Stadium: Soʻgʻdiyona; Referee: Akobirxoʻja Shukurullayev

16 April 2021 4	Navbahor	0–0	Turon	Namangan
UZT (UTC+5)		Report		Stadium: Navbahor; Referee: Abdurashid Xudoyberganov

16 April 2021 5	Lokomotiv	2–1	Bunyodkor	Toshkent
UZT (UTC+5)	Siddiqov 47'; Abduxoliqov 67'	Report	Abdurahmonov 77'	Stadium: Lokomotiv; Referee: Shavkat Nasibullayev

22 June 2021 6	AGMK	1–2	Qizilqum	Jizzakh
UZT (UTC+5)	Yoʻldoshev 34'	Report	Grigalashvili 29'; Boydullayev 36'	Stadium: Soʻgʻdiyona; Referee: Akobirxoʻja Shukurullayev

23 June 2021 7	Paxtakor	1–0	Andijon	Jizzakh
UZT (UTC+5)	Temirov 14'	Report		Stadium: Soʻgʻdiyona; Referee: Abdurashid Xudoyberganov

=== Round 7 ===
4 May 2021 1	Qizilqum	1–1	Navbahor	Qarshi
UZT (UTC+5)	Vatsadze 9'	Report	Panjshanbe 37'	Stadium: Bahrom Vafoyev; Referee: Vadim Agishev

4 May 2021 2	Bunyodkor	2–0	Nasaf	Toshkent
UZT (UTC+5)	Aliqulov 5' (o.g.); Toʻxtasinov 57'	Report		Stadium: Bunyodkor; Referee: Akobirxo'ja Shukurullayev

5 May 2021 3	Andijon	1–2	Kokand 1912	Andijon
UZT (UTC+5)	Boakye 75'; Jaloliddinov 87'	Report	Meliyev 45+1'	Stadium: Bobur Arena; Referee: Ilgiz Tantashev

5 May 2021 4	Mashʼal	1–4	Lokomotiv	Qarshi
UZT (UTC+5)	Murtozoyev 83'	Report	Abduxoliqov 11', 64'; Qobilov 21'; Maxaradze 83'	Stadium: Bahrom Vafoyev; Referee: Rustam Lutfullin

5 May 2021 5	Metallurg	0–2	Soʻgʻdiyona	Bekobod
UZT (UTC+5)		Report	Joʻrabekov 42'; Kolaković 86'	Stadium: Metallurg; Referee: Firdavs Norsafarov

6 May 2021 6	Surxon	0–1	Metallurg	Termiz
UZT (UTC+5)		Report	Đokić 45'	Stadium: Surxon; Referee: Zokir Qodirov

6 May 2021 7	Turon	1–1	Paxtakor	Yaypan
UZT (UTC+5)	Sohibov 48'	Report	Ćeran 37'	Stadium: Oʻzbekiston; Referee: Asker Najafaliyev

=== Round 8 ===
11 May 2021 1	Lokomotiv	1–3	Metallurg	Toshkent
UZT (UTC+5)	Turopov 39'	Report	Temirov 18'; Gʻofurbekov 77', 80'	Stadium: Lokomotiv; Referee: Vadim Agishev

11 May 2021 2	Soʻgʻdiyona	4–1	Andijon	Jizzakh
UZT (UTC+5)	Javohir Qaxramonov 14'; Norxonov 53'; Abdulhaqov 90+3'; Rashidov 90+4'	Report	Boakye 44'	Stadium: Soʻgʻdiyona; Referee: Shavkat Nasibullayev

12 May 2021 3	Navbahor	2–0	Surxon	Namangan
UZT (UTC+5)	Solovyov 56'; Stojanović	Report		Stadium: Navbahor; Referee: Rahimbek Karimov

12 May 2021 4	Paxtakor	3–0	Kokand 1912	Toshkent
UZT (UTC+5)	Xolmatov 39'; Derdiyok 46'; Ćeran 62'	Report		Stadium: Paxtakor; Referee: Rustam Lutfullin

13 May 2021 5	Turon	0–1	Qizilqum	Yaypan
UZT (UTC+5)		Report	Grigalashvili 90+3'	Stadium: Oʻzbekiston; Referee: Abdurashid Xudoyberganov

13 May 2021 6	OKMK	3–1	Bunyodkor	Olmaliq
UZT (UTC+5)	Tursunov 58', 74'; Rahmonov 77'	Report	Gʻiyosov 38'	Stadium: OKMK; Referee: Ilgiz Tantashev

9 July 2021 7	Nasaf	1–0	Mashʼal	Qarshi
UZT (UTC+5)	Gʻaybullayev 16'	Report		Stadium: Qarshi; Referee: Ahrol Risqullayev

=== Round 9 ===
17 May 2021 1	Andijon	1–2	Lokomotiv	Andijon
UZT (UTC+5)	Boakye 10'	Report	Abduxoliqov 36'; Bikmayev 86'	Stadium: Bobur; Referee: Rahimbek Karimov

18 May 2021 2	Surxon	1–0	Turon	Termiz
UZT (UTC+5)	Hasanov 69'	Report		Stadium: Surxon; Referee: Vadim Agishev

18 May 2021 3	Kokand 1912	2–3	Soʻgʻdiyona	Kokand
UZT (UTC+5)	Azimov 1'; Bamba 45+3'	Report	Qahramonov 32', 36'; Jamshid Boltaboyev 35'	Stadium: Markaziy; Referee: Ilgiz Tantashev

18 May 2021 4	Bunyodkor	0–0	Navbahor	Toshkent
UZT (UTC+5)		Report		Stadium: Bunyodkor; Referee: Ahrol Risqullayev

19 May 2021 5	Mashʼal	2–1	OKMK	Kokand
UZT (UTC+5)	Abduraimov 4'; Akramov 45'	Report	Joʻrayev	Stadium: Bahrom Vafoyev; Referee: Ilya Ilyin

19 May 2021 6	Qizilqum	0–1	Paxtakor	Navoiy
UZT (UTC+5)		Report	Ćeran 61'	Stadium: Yoshlar; Referee: Akobirxoʻja Shukurullayev

23 June 2021 7	Metallurg	2–1	Nasaf	Bekobod
UZT (UTC+5)	Abdullayev 46'; Qutiboyev 86'	Report	Komilov 63'	Stadium: Metallurg; Referee: Shavkat Nasibullayev

=== Round 10 ===
18 June 2021 1	Qizilqum	1–1	Surxon	Navoiy
UZT (UTC+5)	Kilichev 12'	Report	Xoltoʻrayev 34'	Stadium: Yoshlar; Referee: Shavkat Nasibullayev

19 June 2021 2	Turon	0–3	Bunyodkor	Yaypan
UZT (UTC+5)		Report	Mirahmadov 32'; Ikromov 38'; Tomiva 90+5'	Stadium: Oʻzbekiston; Referee: Rahimbek Karimov

19 June 2021 3	OKMK	2–0	Metallurg	Bekobod
UZT (UTC+5)	Kasyan 12', 26'	Report		Stadium: OKMK; Referee: Asker Najafaliyev

19 June 2021 4	Paxtakor	0–0	Soʻgʻdiyona	Toshkent
UZT (UTC+5)		Report		Stadium: Paxtakor; Referee: Ahrol Risqullayev

20 June 2021 5	Nasaf	2–0	Andijon	Qarshi
UZT (UTC+5)	Norchayev 22', 54'	Report		Stadium: Qarshi; Referee: Gʻayrat Joʻrayev

20 June 2021 6	Navbahor	2–1	Mashʼal	Toshkent
UZT (UTC+5)	Abdurahimov 45'; Solovyov 61'	Report	Murtozoyev 65'	Stadium: Paxtakor; Referee: Vadim Agishev

20 June 2021 7	Lokomotiv	0–1	Kokand 1912	Qarshi
UZT (UTC+5)		Report	Hasanov 44'	Stadium: Qarshi; Referee: Firdavs Norsafarov

=== Round 11 ===
25 June 2021 1	Soʻgʻdiyona	0–0	Lokomotiv	Jizzakh
UZT (UTC+5)		Report		Stadium: Soʻgʻdiyona; Referee: Akobirxo'ja Shukurullayev

25 June 2021 2	Turon	0–0	Mashʼal	Yaypan
UZT (UTC+5)		Report		Stadium: Oʻzbekiston; Referee: Ahrol Risqullayev

26 June 2021 3	Qizilqum	2–1	Bunyodkor	Navoiy
UZT (UTC+5)	Boydullayev 20'; Vatsadze 39'	Report	Mirahmadov 76'	Stadium: Yoshlar; Referee: Firdavs Norsafarov

26 June 2021 4	Metallurg	2–2	Navbahor	Bekobod
UZT (UTC+5)	Temirov 26'; Gʻofurbekov 54'	Report	Tojiyev 70' (o.g.); Gʻofurov 58'	Stadium: Metallurg; Referee: Elyor Tursunov

27 June 2021 5	Surxon	0–4	Paxtakor	Toshkent
UZT (UTC+5)		Report	Turgʻunboyev 2', 57'; Temirov 22', 58'	Stadium: Paxtakor; Referee: Rahimbek Karimov

27 June 2021 6	Metallurg	2–3	OKMK	Olmaliq
UZT (UTC+5)	Qosimov 38'; Abdumannopov 54'	Report	Fortes 32'; Shoahmedov 36'; Kasyan 43'	Stadium: OKMK; Referee: Vadim Agishev

28 June 2021 7	Kokand 1912	1–2	Nasaf	Yaypan
UZT (UTC+5)	Norbekov 75'	Report	Norchayev 1'; Stanojević 37'	Stadium: Oʻzbekiston; Referee: Zokir Qodirov

=== Round 12 ===
2 July 2021 1	Qizilqum	2–0	Mashʼal	Navoiy
UZT (UTC+5)	Boydullayev 18'; Grigalashvili 30'	Report		Stadium: Yoshlar; Referee: Asker Najafaliyev

2 July 2021 2	Turon	2–0	Metallurg	Yaypan
UZT (UTC+5)	Muzaffarov 18'; Bo-yong 60'	Report		Stadium: Oʻzbekiston; Referee: Akobirxo'ja Shukurullayev

3 July 2021 3	OKMK	2–1	Kokand 1912	Olmaliq
UZT (UTC+5)	Tursunov 63'; Josović 67' (o.g.)	Report	Norbekov 71'	Stadium: OKMK; Referee: Rahimbek Karimov

3 July 2021 4	Navbahor	0–1	Andijon	Namangan
UZT (UTC+5)		Report	Ismonaliyev 90+4'	Stadium: Navbahor; Referee: Zokir Qodirov

4 July 2021 5	Paxtakor	2–1	Lokomotiv	Toshkent
UZT (UTC+5)	Ćeran 22'; Temirov 45+2'	Report	Amonov 90+2'	Stadium: Paxtakor; Referee: Vadim Agishev

4 July 2021 6	Surxon	1–5	Bunyodkor	Olmaliq
UZT (UTC+5)	Gʻofurov 90+3'	Report	Erkinov 9'; Ikromov 40', 62'; Tomiva 85', 86'	Stadium: OKMK; Referee: Ahrol Risqullayev

4 July 2021 7	Nasaf	1–0	Soʻgʻdiyona	Qarshi
UZT (UTC+5)	Norchayev 53'	Report		Stadium: Qarshi; Referee: Shavkat Nasibullayev

=== Round 13 ===
30 July 2021 1	Lokomotiv	2–0	Nasaf	Toshkent
UZT (UTC+5)	Amonov 13', 37'	Report		Stadium: Lokomotiv; Referee: Zokir Qodirov

30 July 2021 2	Mashʼal	2–1	Surxon	Qarshi
UZT (UTC+5)	Chigozie 46'; Okwara 81'	Report	Abdurahmonov 74'	Stadium: Qarshi; Referee: Rustam Lutfullin

31 July 2021 3	Paxtakor	1–0	Bunyodkor	Toshkent
UZT (UTC+5)	Ćeran 45+2'	Report		Stadium: Paxtakor; Referee: Asker Najafaliyev

31 July 2021 4	Soʻgʻdiyona	0–0	OKMK	Jizzakh
UZT (UTC+5)		Report		Stadium: Soʻgʻdiyona; Referee: Ilgiz Tantashev

31 July 2021 5	Andijon	1–1	Turon	Namangan
UZT (UTC+5)	Zabelin 51'	Report	Abdullajonov 38'	Stadium: Navbahor; Referee: Rahimbek Karimov

1 August 2021 6	Metallurg	1–2	Qizilqum	Olmaliq
UZT (UTC+5)	Ibrohimov 67'	Report	Vatsadze 56'; Grigalashvili 64'	Stadium: Metallurg; Referee: Vadim Agishev

1 August 2021 7	Kokand 1912	1–2	Navbahor	Yaypan
UZT (UTC+5)	Golban 90+7' (o.g.)	Report	Ahmedov 13'; Sardor Telyakov 81'	Stadium: Oʻzbekiston; Referee: Ahrol Risqullayev

=== Round 14 ===
6 August 2021 1	Paxtakor	1–0	Nasaf	Toshkent
UZT (UTC+5)	Matić 20'	Report		Stadium: Lokomotiv; Referee: Rahimbek Karimov

6 August 2021 2	Mashʼal	1–1	Bunyodkor	Olmaliq
UZT (UTC+5)	Allayev 24'	Report	Ikromov 77'	Stadium: OKMK; Referee: Shavkat Nasibullayev

7 August 2021 3	Metallurg	0–1	Surxon	Toshkent
UZT (UTC+5)		Report	Pavlenko 90+2'	Stadium: Lokomotiv; Referee: Firdavs Norsafarov

7 August 2021 4	Lokomotiv	1–1	OKMK	Toshkent
UZT (UTC+5)	Komilov 84' (o.g.)	Report	Boakye 90'	Stadium: Lokomotiv; Referee: Ahrol Risqullayev

8 August 2021 5	Andijon	1–1	Qizilqum	Namangan
UZT (UTC+5)	Vasilyev 42'	Report	Vatsadze 55'	Stadium: Navbahor; Referee: Elyor Tursunov

8 August 2021 6	Soʻgʻdiyona	1–0	Navbahor	Toshkent
UZT (UTC+5)	Norxonov 21'	Report		Stadium: Lokomotiv; Referee: Asker Najafaliyev

8 August 2021 7	Kokand 1912	2–2	Turon	Yaypan
UZT (UTC+5)	Lukić 85'; Hasanov 71'	Report	Bo-yong 73'; Abdullajonov 79'	Stadium: Oʻzbekiston; Referee: Akobirxo'ja Shukurullayev

=== Round 15 ===
13 August 2021 1	Mashʼal	0–1	Paxtakor	Toshkent
UZT (UTC+5)		Report	Ćeran 33'	Stadium: Paxtakor; Referee: Ilgiz Tantashev

13 August 2021 2	Surxon	2–0	Andijon	Samarqand
UZT (UTC+5)	Gʻofurov 45'; Bobojonov 76'	Report		Stadium: Dinamo; Referee: Vadim Agishev

13 August 2021 3	Bunyodkor	2–0	Metallurg	Toshkent
UZT (UTC+5)	Ikromov 51'; Mirahmadov 72'	Report		Stadium: Bunyodkor

14 August 2021 4	Turon	1–0	Soʻgʻdiyona	Yaypan
UZT (UTC+5)	Musayev 23'	Report		Stadium: Oʻzbekiston

14 August 2021 5	Qizilqum	2–2	Kokand 1912	Navoiy
UZT (UTC+5)	Vatsadze 9'; Azimov 40'	Report	Kuxianidze 74'; Sidorov 83'	Stadium: Youth Sports Complex (Navoi)

15 August 2021 6	AGMK	1–1	Nasaf	Olmaliq
UZT (UTC+5)	Đokić 28'	Report	Aliqulov 90+2'	Stadium: OKMK

15 August 2021 7	Navbahor	1–0	Lokomotiv	Namangan
UZT (UTC+5)	Gʻanixonov 90+4'	Report		Stadium: Navbahor

=== Round 16 ===
25 August 2021 1	Kokand 1912	2–0	Surxon	Toshkent
UZT (UTC+5)	Josović 15'; Azimov 43'	Report		Stadium: Bunyodkor; Referee: Shavkat Nasibullayev

25 August 2021 2	Metallurg	1–2	Mashʼal	Bekobod
UZT (UTC+5)	Nurmatov 56'	Report	Chigozie 6'; Shaymanov 78'	Stadium: Metallurg; Referee: Gʻayrat Joʻrayev

25 August 2021 3	Soʻgʻdiyona	2–1	Qizilqum	Bekobod
UZT (UTC+5)	Nasriddinov 38'; Čermelj 64'	Report	Grigalashvili 90+2'	Stadium: Metallurg; Referee: Viktor Serazitdinov

26 August 2021 4	Andijon	1–4	Bunyodkor	Andijon
UZT (UTC+5)	Rahimqulov 33'	Report	Tomiva 30', 52'; Mirahmadov 64'; Ikromov 67'	Stadium: Bobur; Referee: Ahrol Risqullayev

26 August 2021 5	Paxtakor	1–0	AGMK	Toshkent
UZT (UTC+5)	Turgʻunboyev 5'	Report		Stadium: Paxtakor; Referee: Akobirxoʻja Shukurullayev

27 August 2021 6	Lokomotiv	3–1	Turon	Toshkent
UZT (UTC+5)	Abduxoliqov 42', 71'; Amonov 77'	Report	Toshmirzayev 30'	Stadium: Lokomotiv; Referee: Elyor Tursunov

28 August 2021 7	Nasaf	0–1	Navbahor	Qarshi
UZT (UTC+5)		Report	Guttiner 83'	Stadium: Qarshi; Referee: Zokir Qodirov

=== Round 17 ===
9 September 2021 1	Mashʼal	0–1	Andijon	Muborak
UZT (UTC+5)		Report	Ismonaliyev 31'	Stadium: Bahrom Vafoyev; Referee: Ilya Ilyin

10 September 2021 2	Navbahor	0–0	AGMK	Namangan
UZT (UTC+5)		Report		Stadium: Navbahor; Referee: Ilgiz Tantashev

10 September 2021 3	Metallurg	0–3	Paxtakor	Jizzakh
UZT (UTC+5)		Report	Ćeran 29'; Turgʻunboyev 31'; Matić 71'	Stadium: Soʻgʻdiyona; Referee: Viktor Serazitdinov

10 September 2021 4	Bunyodkor	2–1	Kokand 1912	Andijon
UZT (UTC+5)	Toʻrayev 26'; Oʻlmasaliyev 29'	Report	Josović 42'	Stadium: Bobur; Referee: Firdavs Norsafarov

11 September 2021 5	Surxon	0–1	Soʻgʻdiyona	Termiz
UZT (UTC+5)		Report	Gʻofurov 35' (o.g.)	Stadium: Surxon; Referee: Vadim Agishev

11 September 2021 6	Qizilqum	0–0	Lokomotiv	Navoiy
UZT (UTC+5)		Report		Stadium: Yoshlar; Referee: Rustam Lutfullin

11 September 2021 7	Turon	0–2	Nasaf	Yaypan
UZT (UTC+5)		Report	Aliqulov 22'; Norchayev 83'	Stadium: Oʻzbekiston; Referee: Shavkat Nasibullayev

=== Round 18 ===
14 September 2021 1	Kokand 1912	2–2	Mashʼal	Kokand
UZT (UTC+5)	Xojimirzayev 13'; Meliyev 36'	Report	Ubaydullayev 20', 94'	Stadium: Kokand; Referee: Elyor Tursunov

15 September 2021 2	Andijon	1–2	Metallurg	Andijon
UZT (UTC+5)	Ismonaliyev 73'	Report	Temirov 87'; Nagayev 89'	Stadium: Bobur; Referee: Abdurashid Xudoyberganov

15 September 2021 3	AGMK	2–0	Turon	Olmaliq
UZT (UTC+5)	Qosimov 51'; Kasyan 77'	Report		Stadium: OKMK; Referee: Rahimbek Karimov

15 September 2021 4	Paxtakor	0–0	Navbahor	Toshkent
UZT (UTC+5)		Report		Stadium: Paxtakor; Referee: Zokir Qodirov

16 September 2021 5	Lokomotiv	2–0	Surxon	Toshkent
UZT (UTC+5)	Amonov 49'; Qodirqulov 57'	Report		Stadium: Lokomotiv; Referee: Firdavs Norsafarov

16 September 2021 6	Nasaf	2–1	Qizilqum	Qarshi
UZT (UTC+5)	Stanojević 13'; Aliqulov 23'	Report	Grigalashvili 49'	Stadium: Qarshi; Referee: Aziz Asimov

16 September 2021 7	Soʻgʻdiyona	0–0	Bunyodkor	Jizzakh
UZT (UTC+5)		Report		Stadium: Soʻgʻdiyona; Referee: Ahrol Risqullayev

=== Round 19 ===
19 September 2021 1	Andijon	1–0	Paxtakor	Andijon
UZT (UTC+5)		Report	Sohibjonov 25'	Stadium: Bobur; Referee: Shavkat Nasibullayev

19 September 2021 2	Metallurg	0–1	Kokand 1912	Bekobod
UZT (UTC+5)		Report	Josović 70'	Stadium: Metallurg; Referee: Akobirxoʻja Shukurullayev

20 September 2021 3	Qizilqum	0–0	AGMK	Navoiy
UZT (UTC+5)		Report		Stadium: Yoshlar; Referee: Firdavs Norsafarov

20 September 2021 4	Turon	0–1	Navbahor	Yaypan
UZT (UTC+5)		Report	Ziyovuddinov 37' (o.g.)	Stadium: Oʻzbekiston; Referee: Rustam Lutfullin

21 September 2021 5	Mashʼal	0–0	Soʻgʻdiyona	Muborak
UZT (UTC+5)		Report		Stadium: Bahrom Vafoyev; Referee: Aziz Asimov

21 September 2021 6	Bunyodkor	3–2	Lokomotiv	Olmaliq
UZT (UTC+5)	Gʻiyosov 34', 90+3'; Mirahmadov 90+9'	Report	Grigalashvili 49'	Stadium: OKMK; Referee: Zokir Qodirov

11 October 2021 7	Surxon	2–2	Nasaf	Termiz
UZT (UTC+5)	Hasanov 58'; Yusupov 64'	Report	Kaluđerović 38'; Abdurahimov 52'	Stadium: Surxon; Referee: Vadim Agishev

=== Round 20 ===
25 September 2021 1	Kokand 1912	1–1	Andijon	Kokand
UZT (UTC+5)	Sovpel 55'	Report	Josović 90+6'	Stadium: Kokand; Referee: Rahimbek Karimov

25 September 2021 2	Paxtakor	3–1	Turon	Toshkent
UZT (UTC+5)	Ćeran 26'; Temirov 62'; Erkinov 90+2'	Report	Vladislav Kasminin 49'	Stadium: Paxtakor; Referee: Akobirxoʻja Shukurullayev

26 September 2021 3	Soʻgʻdiyona	2–0	Metallurg	Jizzakh
UZT (UTC+5)	Boltaboyev 1'; Norxonov 50'	Report		Stadium: Soʻgʻdiyona; Referee: Vadim Agishev

26 September 2021 4	Navbahor	0–0	Qizilqum	Namangan
UZT (UTC+5)		Report		Stadium: Navbahor; Referee: Ahrol Risqullayev

21 September 2021 5	AGMK	1–0	Surxon	Olmaliq
UZT (UTC+5)	Ahmadaliyev 77'	Report		Stadium: OKMK; Referee: Ilgiz Tantashev

27 September 2021 6	Nasaf	5–0	Bunyodkor	Qarshi
UZT (UTC+5)	Abdurahimov 9'; Norchayev 19', 80'; Bozorov 87'; Nurulloyev 89'	Report		Stadium: Qarshi; Referee: Asker Najafaliyev

27 September 2021 7	Lokomotiv	2–1	Mashʼal	Toshkent
UZT (UTC+5)	Jaloliddinov 51'; Abduxoliqov 90+8'	Report	Okwara 34'	Stadium: Lokomotiv; Referee: Shavkat Nasibullayev

=== Round 21 ===
1 October 2021 1	Kokand 1912	1–1	Paxtakor	Kokand
UZT (UTC+5)	Rustamov 9'; Hasanov 40'; Bamba 71'; Azimov 76'	Report	Azmiddinov 47'; Erkinov 71'	Stadium: Kokand; Referee: Vadim Agishev

1 October 2021 2	Metallurg	1–2	Lokomotiv	Toshkent
UZT (UTC+5)	Temirov 62'	Report	Abduxoliqov 59'; Amonov 90+2'	Stadium: Metallurg; Referee: Ilgiz Tantashev

2 October 2021 3	Mashʼal	0–1	Nasaf	Muborak
UZT (UTC+5)		Report	Nasrullayev 25'	Stadium: Bahrom Vafoyev; Referee: Viktor Serazitdinov

2 October 2021 4	Andijon	0–0	Soʻgʻdiyona	Andijon
UZT (UTC+5)		Report		Stadium: Bobur; Referee: Firdavs Norsafarov

2 October 2021 5	Bunyodkor	1–1	AGMK	Toshkent
UZT (UTC+5)	Izzatov 63'	Report	Rahmonov 75'	Stadium: Bunyodkor; Referee: Elyor Tursunov

3 October 2021 6	Surxon	5–0	Navbahor	Termiz
UZT (UTC+5)	Bobojonov 52'	Report		Stadium: Surxon; Referee: Zokir Qodirov

3 October 2021 7	Qizilqum	2–1	Turon	Navoiy
UZT (UTC+5)	Grigalashvili 38', 71'	Report	Muzaffarov 61'	Stadium: Yoshlar; Referee: Abdurashid Xudoyberganov

=== Round 22 ===
15 October 2021 1	AGMK	3–2	Mashʼal	Bekobod
UZT (UTC+5)	Shoahmedov 12'; Qosimov 17'; Otaxonov 51'	Report	Chigozie 8'; Qoʻziyev 86'	Stadium: Metallurg; Referee: Rahimbek Karimov

15 October 2021 2	Nasaf	1–0	Metallurg	Qarshi
UZT (UTC+5)	Eshmurodov 12'	Report		Stadium: Qarshi; Referee: Zokir Qodirov

16 October 2021 3	Paxtakor	4–2	Qizilqum	Toshkent
UZT (UTC+5)	Mustafoyev 3' (o.g.); Ćeran 38', 60', 66'	Report	Grigalashvili 13'; Boydullayev 45+1'	Stadium: Paxtakor; Referee: Firdavs Norsafarov

16 October 2021 4	Turon	1–1	Surxon	Andijon
UZT (UTC+5)	Musayev 68'	Report	Bobojonov 47'	Stadium: Oʻzbekiston; Referee: Shavkat Nasibullayev

16 October 2021 5	Soʻgʻdiyona	1–1	Kokand 1912	Jizzakh
UZT (UTC+5)	Orifov 37'	Report	Xolmuhammedov 5'	Stadium: Soʻgʻdiyona; Referee: Asker Najafaliyev

17 October 2021 6	Navbahor	2–1	Bunyodkor	Namangan
UZT (UTC+5)	Telyakov 58'; Oʻrinboyev 60'	Report	Toʻxtasinov 49'	Stadium: Navbahor; Referee: Akobirxoʻja Shukurullayev

17 October 2021 7	Lokomotiv	2–2	Andijon	Toshkent
UZT (UTC+5)	Abduxoliqov 46'; Amonov 82'	Report	Sohibjonov 78'; Zabelin 94'	Stadium: Lokomotiv; Referee: Elyor Tursunov

=== Round 23 ===
21 October 2021 1	Metallurg	0–1	AGMK	Bekobod
UZT (UTC+5)		Report	Kasyan 18'	Stadium: Metallurg; Referee: Asker Najafaliyev

22 October 2021 2	Surxon	1–0	Qizilqum	Termiz
UZT (UTC+5)	Xoltoʻrayev 55'	Report		Stadium: Surxon; Referee: Akobirxoʻja Shukurullayev

22 October 2021 3	Bunyodkor	3–1	Turon	Toshkent
UZT (UTC+5)	Gʻiyosov 35'; Rahmonaliyev 90+3'; Toʻxtasinov 90+6'	Report	Murtozoyev 77'	Stadium: Bunyodkor; Referee: Ilgiz Tantashev

23 October 2021 4	Kokand 1912	2–1	Lokomotiv	Andijon
UZT (UTC+5)	Bamba 39'; Azimov 75'	Report	Turopov 68'	Stadium: Kokand; Referee: Zokir Qodirov

23 October 2021 5	Mashʼal	0–0	Navbahor	Muborak
UZT (UTC+5)		Report		Stadium: Bahrom Vafoyev; Referee: Rahimbek Karimov

24 October 2021 6	Soʻgʻdiyona	1–0	Paxtakor	Jizzakh
UZT (UTC+5)	Joʻrabekov 53'	Report		Stadium: Soʻgʻdiyona; Referee: Vadim Agishev

25 October 2021 7	Andijon	1–1	Nasaf	Andijon
UZT (UTC+5)	Sovpel 26'	Report	Kaluđerović 57'	Stadium: Bobur; Referee: Aziz Asimov

=== Round 24 ===
4 November 2021 1	AGMK	3–2	Andijon	Olmaliq
UZT (UTC+5)	Boakye 72', 75'; Gadoyev 90+5'	Report	Toirov 43'; Zabelin 58'	Stadium: OKMK; Referee: Akobirxoʻja Shukurullayev

4 November 2021 2	Bunyodkor	1–0	Qizilqum	Toshkent
UZT (UTC+5)	Kenjaboyev 53' (o.g.)	Report		Stadium: Bunyodkor; Referee: Elyor Tursunov

5 November 2021 3	Lokomotiv	1–0	Soʻgʻdiyona	Toshkent
UZT (UTC+5)	Abduxoliqov 45+3'	Report		Stadium: Lokomotiv; Referee: Shavkat Nasibullayev

5 November 2021 4	Navbahor	1–0	Metallurg	Namangan
UZT (UTC+5)	Ahmedov 86'	Report		Stadium: Navbahor; Referee: Ilgiz Tantashev

6 November 2021 5	Mashʼal	0–0	Turon	Muborak
UZT (UTC+5)		Report		Stadium: Bahrom Vafoyev; Referee: Asker Najafaliyev

6 November 2021 6	Paxtakor	5–0	Surxon	Toshkent
UZT (UTC+5)	Ćeran 36', 82'; Temirov 62', 68'; Azmiddinov 78'	Report		Stadium: Paxtakor; Referee: Ahrol Risqullayev

15 November 2021 7	Nasaf	3–1	Kokand 1912	Qarshi
UZT (UTC+5)	Norchayev 10'; Abdurahimov 56'; Davronov 67'	Report	Sidorov 76'	Stadium: Qarshi; Referee: Akobirxoʻja Shukurullayev

=== Round 25 ===
20 November 2021 1	Kokand 1912	2–2	AGMK	Olmaliq
UZT (UTC+5)	Sidorov 72'; Josović 84'	Report	Boakye 15'; Yoʻldashov 82'	Stadium: OKMK; Referee: Ilgiz Tantashev

20 November 2021 2	Soʻgʻdiyona	1–1	Nasaf	Jizzakh
UZT (UTC+5)	Norxonov 50'	Report	Norchayev 80'	Stadium: Soʻgʻdiyona; Referee: Asker Najafaliyev

20 November 2021 3	Bunyodkor	3–1	Surxon	Toshkent
UZT (UTC+5)	Oʻlmasaliyev 25', 41'; Gʻiyosov 68'	Report	Bobojonov 34'	Stadium: Bunyodkor; Referee: Vadim Agishev

20 November 2021 4	Lokomotiv	0–3	Paxtakor	Kokand
UZT (UTC+5)		Report	Erkinov 36', 80', 84'	Stadium: Kokand; Referee: Doston Mirzaraimov

21 November 2021 5	Andijon	1–2	Navbahor	Andijon
UZT (UTC+5)	Ismonaliyev 87'	Report	Golban 67'; Najdenov 89'	Stadium: Bobur; Referee: Zokir Qodirov

21 November 2021 6	Metallurg	1–0	Turon	Toshkent
UZT (UTC+5)	Nurmatov 22'	Report		Stadium: Metallurg; Referee: Ahrol Risqullayev

21 November 2021 7	Mashʼal	2–1	Qizilqum	Qarshi
UZT (UTC+5)	Okwara 56', 74'	Report	Tolmasov 33'	Stadium: Bahrom Vafoyev; Referee: Aziz Asimov

=== Round 26 ===
27 November 2021 1	AGMK	0–1	Soʻgʻdiyona	Olmaliq
UZT (UTC+5)		Report	Qahramonov 90+3'	Stadium: OKMK; Referee: Zokir Qodirov

27 November 2021 2	Bunyodkor	3–2	Paxtakor	Toshkent
UZT (UTC+5)	Gʻiyosov 1'; Mirahmadov 77', 82'	Report	Temirov 26'; Muhiddinov 38'	Stadium: Bunyodkor; Referee: Sultonmurod Abdurahmonov

27 November 2021 3	Nasaf	1–3	Lokomotiv	Toshkent
UZT (UTC+5)	Norchayev 7'	Report	Amonov 70'; Abduxoliqov 75', 82'	Stadium: Bunyodkor; Referee: Rustam Lutfullin

27 November 2021 4	Surxon	1–0	Mashʼal	Termiz
UZT (UTC+5)	Bobojonov 38'	Report		Stadium: Surxon; Referee: Ilgiz Tantashev

27 November 2021 5	Navbahor	2–3	Kokand 1912	Namangan
UZT (UTC+5)	Gʻulomov 12'; Najdenov 90+7'	Report	Norbekov 5'; Sidorov 54'; Hasanov 60'	Stadium: Navbahor; Referee: Abdurashid Xudoyberganov

27 November 2021 6	Qizilqum	1–3	Metallurg	Navoiy
UZT (UTC+5)	Kuxianidze 64'	Report	Abdullayev 17'; Rahmatullayev 36'; Sattorov 62'	Stadium: Yoshlar; Referee: Vadim Agishev

27 November 2021 7	Turon	1–0	Andijon	Yaypan
UZT (UTC+5)	Otaxonov 50' (o.g.)	Report		Stadium: Oʻzbekistan; Referee: G'ayrat Jo'rayev

== Positions by round ==
Team ╲ Round	1	2	3	4	5	6	7	8	9	10	11	12	13	14	15	16	17	18	19	20	21	22	23	24	25	26
Pakhtakor Tashkent	1	1	1	1	1	1	1	1	1	1	1	1	1	1	1	1	1	1	1	1	1	1	1	1	1	1
Sogdiana Jizzakh	4	2	2	2	2	2	2	2	2	2	2	4	3	2	3	2	2	2	2	2	2	4	4	4	4	2
AGMK	2	3	8	4	6	8	7	3	3	3	3	2	2	3	2	3	3	3	3	4	4	2	2	2	2	3
Nasaf Qarshi	8	11	12	7	4	3	4	6	8	7	4	3	4	5	5	6	5	4	5	3	3	3	3	3	3	4
Bunyodkor	6	8	3	3	5	6	6	7	5	4	7	6	6	6	6	4	4	5	4	5	5	5	5	5	5	5
Lokomotiv Tashkent	10	12	13	13	9	7	5	8	4	8	8	8	7	7	8	8	8	7	8	6	6	7	7	6	7	6
Navbahor Namangan	13	6	6	8	10	10	10	10	9	10	10	10	8	8	7	7	7	8	6	7	7	6	6	7	6	7
Kokand 1912	3	4	3	6	3	4	3	4	7	6	9	9	10	9	9	9	9	9	9	9	9	8	8	8	8	8
Qizilqum Zarafshon	5	5	5	5	8	9	9	9	10	9	5	5	5	4	4	5	6	6	7	8	8	9	9	9	9	9
Surkhon Termez	7	10	7	9	11	13	13	13	12	12	12	12	14	12	11	12	12	12	13	13	13	10	10	10	12	10
Metallurg Bekabad	14	9	9	12	7	5	8	5	6	5	6	7	9	10	10	10	11	10	10	10	10	12	12	12	11	11
Mash'al Mubarek	12	14	11	11	13	11	11	11	11	11	11	11	11	11	12	11	10	11	11	11	11	11	11	11	10	12
Andijon	11	7	10	10	12	12	12	12	13	13	14	14	13	14	14	14	14	14	12	12	12	13	13	13	13	13
Turon	9	13	14	14	14	14	14	14	14	14	13	13	12	13	13	13	13	13	14	14	14	14	14	14	14	14

Leader and qualification to AFC Champions League group stage
Standby team of the AFC Cup group stage
Relegation to Uzbekistan Pro League#Relegation play off
Relegation to Uzbekistan Pro League

Updated to match(es) played on 21 September 2021. Source: Uzbekistan Professional Football League

== Results ==
Home \ Away	AGM	AND	BUN	KOK	LOK	MAS	MET	NAS	NAV	PAK	QIZ	SOG	SUR	TUR
AGMK	—	3–2	3–1	2–1	2–1	3–2	2–0	1–1	2–1	0–3	1–2	0–1	1–0	2–0
Andijon	2–3	—	1–4	1–2	1–2	1–1	1–2	1–1	1–2	1–0	1–1	0–0	1–0	1–1
Bunyodkor	1–1	3–1	—	2–1	3–2	1–0	2–0	2–0	0–0	3–2	1–0	2–2	3–1	3–1
Kokand	2–2	1–1	0–0	—	2–1	2–2	0–1	1–2	1–2	4–2	0–0	2–3	2–0	2–2
Lokomotiv	1–1	2–2	2–1	0–1	—	2–1	1–3	2–0	1–2	0–3	1–1	1–0	2–0	3–1
Mash'al	2–1	0–1	1–1	0–2	1–4	—	2–1	0–1	0–0	0–1	2–1	0–0	2–1	0–0
Metallurg	0–1	2–0	1–0	0–1	1–2	1–2	—	2–1	2–2	0–3	1–2	0–2	0–1	1–0
Nasaf	1–1	2–0	5–0	3–1	1–3	1–0	1–0	—	0–1	2–3	2–1	1–0	6–0	4–0
Navbahor	0–0	0–1	2–1	2–3	1–0	2–1	1–0	0–0	—	1–2	0–0	0–1	2–0	0–0
Pakhtakor	1–0	1–0	1–0	3–0	2–1	3–0	2–1	1–0	0–0	—	4–2	0–0	5–0	3–1
Qizilqum	0–0	1–0	2–1	2–2	0–0	2–0	1–3	1–2	1–1	0–1	—	1–1	1–1	2–1
Sogdiana	0–0	4–1	0–0	1–1	0–0	2–2	2–0	1–1	1–0	1–0	2–1	—	2–1	1–0
Surkhon	0–1	2–0	1–5	1–1	0–1	1–0	1–0	2–2	1–0	0–4	1–0	0–1	—	1–0
Turon	0–1	1–0	0–3	1–2	2–2	0–0	2–0	0–2	0–1	1–1	0–1	1–0	1–1	—

Source: Uzbekistan Professional Football League
Legend: Blue = home team win; Yellow = draw; Red = away team win.

=== Results by match played ===
Team ╲ Round	1	2	3	4	5	6	7	8	9	10	11	12	13	14	15	16	17	18	19
AGMK	W	D	L	W	W	L	W	W	L	W	W	W	D	D	D	L	D	W	D
Andijon	L	W	L	D	L	L	L	L	L	L	L	W	D	D	L	L	W	L	W
Bunyodkor	W	L	W	D	D	L	W	L	D	W	L	W	L	D	W	W	W	D	W
Kokand	W	D	D	D	W	L	W	L	L	W	L	L	L	D	D	W	L	D	W
Lokomotiv	L	L	D	D	W	W	W	L	W	L	D	L	W	D	L	W	D	W	L
Mash'al	L	L	W	D	L	D	L	L	W	L	D	L	W	D	L	W	L	D	D
Metallurg	L	W	L	L	W	W	L	W	W	L	D	L	L	L	L	L	L	W	L
Nasaf	L	D	D	W	W	W	L	W	L	W	W	W	L	L	D	L	W	W	
Navbahor	L	W	D	L	L	D	D	W	D	W	D	L	W	L	W	W	D	D	W
Pakhtakor	W	W	W	W	W	W	D	W	W	D	W	W	W	W	W	W	W	D	L
Qizilqum	W	D	D	D	L	W	D	W	L	D	W	W	W	D	D	L	D	L	D
Sogdiana	W	W	D	W	D	D	W	W	W	D	D	L	D	W	L	W	W	D	D
Surkhon	W	L	D	L	L	L	L	L	W	D	L	L	L	W	W	L	L	L	
Turon	L	L	D	L	L	D	D	L	L	L	D	W	D	D	W	L	L	L	L

Updated to match(es) played on 21 September 2021. Source: Championat.Asia
W = Win; D = Draw; L = Loss; P = Postponed

=== 2021 Uzbekistan U19 Championship under Super League results ===
Uzbekistan U19 Championship
- Season: 2021
- Champions: Neftchi U19
- Matches: 276
- Goals: 1,147 (4.16 per match)
- Top goalscorer: Asadbek Joʻraboyev (21)
- Biggest home win: Yangiyer U19 7:0 Shoʻrtan U19 (27 October 2021)
- Biggest away win: Aral samali U19 0:8 Navbahor U19 (27 August 2021)
- Highest scoring: Navbahor U19 8:2 Metallurg U19 (21 June 2021)
- Highest attendance: 362 (04.10.2021, Andijon U19 3:0 Olimpik U19)

The second season of the tournament kicked off on 5 April. This season, players born in 2002 and later were registered.

#	Team name	Game	Win	Draw	Loss	Goal difference	Points
1	Neftchi U19	23	17	4	2	58-29	55
2	Paxtakor U19	23	16	5	2	70-26	53
3	Navbahor U19	23	16	3	4	75-32	51
4	Bunyodkor U19	23	14	3	6	44-30	45
5	Nasaf U19	23	13	6	4	62-29	45
6	Qoʻqon 1912 U19	23	12	5	6	58-41	41
7	Yangiyer U19	23	12	4	7	50-36	40
8	Lokomotiv U19	23	11	5	7	35-36	38
9	Turon U19	23	10	5	8	37-32	35
10	Andijon U19	23	10	5	8	42-34	35
11	Soʻgʻdiyona U19	23	10	4	9	36-47	34
12	Istiqlol U19	23	9	5	9	36-45	32
13	Xorazm U19	23	9	4	10	36-44	31
14	Surkhon U19	23	8	6	9	39-46	30
15	Olimpik U19	23	9	3	11	48-46	30
16	AGMK U19	23	8	6	9	39-46	30
17	Mashʼal U19	23	7	8	8	40-42	29
19	Nurafshon U19	23	8	2	13	34-49	26
20	Dinamo-Samarqand U19	23	6	4	13	33-51	22
21	Metallurg U19	23	6	4	13	32-58	21
22	Qizilqum U19	23	3	4	16	29-57	13
23	Aral samali U19	23	2	3	18	31-81	9
24	Oqtepa U19	23	1	3	19	16-25	6

=== 2021 Uzbekistan U21 Championship under Super League results ===
Uzbekistan U21 Championship
- Season: 2021
- Champions: AGMK U21
- Matches: 182
- Goals: 539 (2.96 per match)
- Top goalscorer: Husayn Ergashboyev (16)
- Biggest home win: Bunyodkor U21 4:2 Lokomotiv U21 (9 March 2021)
- Biggest away win: Metallurg U21 2:6 Bunyodkor U21 (15 March 2021)
- Highest scoring: Metallurg U21 2:6 Bunyodkor U21 (15 March 2021)
- Highest attendance: 2152 (06.04.2021, Navbahor U21 2:2 Paxtakor U21)

#	Team	Game	Win	Draw	Loss	Goals ratio	Points
1	AGMK U21	26	19	4	3	48-24	61
2	Nasaf U21	26	12	9	5	52-33	45
3	Paxtakor U21	26	12	9	5	55-40	45
4	Bunyodkor U21	26	13	5	8	45-36	44
5	Navbahor U21	26	13	4	9	45-32	43
6	Mashʼal U21	26	12	7	7	45-34	43
7	Lokomotiv U21	26	10	9	7	35-29	39
8	Turon U21	26	11	4	11	31-31	37
9	Qizilqum U21	26	9	5	12	39-45	32
10	Surxon U21	26	7	7	12	38-49	28
11	Qoʻqon-1912 U21	26	6	8	12	37-50	26
12	Soʻgʻdiyona U21	26	5	7	14	32-43	22
13	Andijon U21	26	5	5	16	24-51	20
14	Metallurg U21	26	5	3	18	24-53	18

== Relegation play-off ==
Team 1	Score	Team 2
FK Olympic Tashkent	3–1	FK Mash'al Mubarek

== Season Statistics ==
- First goal of the season: Alvin Fortes for AGMK against Lokomotiv Tashkent (9 March 2021)

Pakhtakor's Dragan Ćeran won the Super League Golden Boot after scoring 16 goals, a record for a 21-game Super League season

.

=== Goalscorers ===
As of match played 27 November 2021

#	Player	Club	Goals
1	(Serbia) Dragan Ćeran	Pakhtakor Tashkent	16
2	(Uzbekistan) Temurkhuja Abdukholiqov	Lokomotiv Tashkent	14
3	(Uzbekistan) Khusayin Norchaev	Nasaf	13
4	(Uzbekistan) Shokhruz Norkhonov	Sogdiana Jizzakh	10
5	(Georgia (country)) Elgujja Grigalashvili	Qizilqum Zarafshon	9
5	(Uzbekistan) Khursid Giyosov	Bunyodkor	9
7	(Uzbekistan) Sherzod Temirov	Pakhtakor Tashkent	8
7	(Uzbekistan) Mirjahon Mirakhmadov	Bunyodkor	8
7	(Uzbekistan) Azizbek Amonov	Lokomotiv Tashkent	8
10	(Serbia) Marko Stanojević	Nasaf	6
10	(Uzbekistan) Farrukh Ikromov	Bunyodkor	6
10	(Nigeria) Ibrahim Tomiwa	Bunyodkor	6
10	(Italy) Martin Boakye	Andijon/AGMK	6
10	(Ukraine) Aleksandr Kasyan	AGMK	6

== Attendances ==
=== By round ===
As of match played 21 September 2021

2021 Uzbekistan Super League Attendance
Round	Total	GP.	Avg. Per Game
Round 1	47,752	7	6,822
Round 2	37,687	7	5,384
Round 3	39,491	7	5,642
Round 4	28,634	7	4,091
Round 5	40,273	7	5,753
Round 6	18,253	7	2,608
Round 7	22,496	7	3,214
Round 8	13,997	7	2,000
Round 9	29,900	7	4,271
Round 10	28,456	7	4,065
Round 11	16,084	7	2,298
Round 12	17,844	7	2,549
Round 13	0	7	0
Round 14	0	7	0
Round 15	0	7	0
Round 16	0	7	0
Round 17	0	7	0
Round 18	0	7	0
Round 19	4,397	6	733
Total	345,264	132	2,616

=== By team ===
Pos	Team	Total	High	Low	Average	Change
1	AGMK	14,544	4,411	0	1,616	n/a
2	Andijon	33,613	13,800	0	3,361	n/a
3	Bunyodkor	14,702	5,100	0	1,838	n/a
4	Kokand	21,927	6,542	0	2,436	n/a
5	Lokomotiv	10,637	5,089	0	1,182	n/a
6	Mash'al	6,261	3,200	0	696	n/a
7	Metallurg	23,608	6,340	0	2,361	n/a
8	Nasaf	34,703	11,812	0	3,856	n/a
9	Navbahor	64,300	19,358	0	7,144	n/a
10	Pakhtakor	18,323	10,560	0	1,832	n/a
11	Qizilqum	32,343	7,832	0	2,940	n/a
12	Sogdiana	14,010	4,200	0	1,557	n/a
13	Surkhon	14,920	4,545	0	1,658	n/a
14	Turon	41,373	6,496	0	3,761	n/a
	League total	345,264	19,358	0	2,616	n/a

Updated to games played on 21 September 2021

== See also ==
- 2021 Uzbekistan Pro League
- 2021 Uzbekistan Cup
