= 2022 Uzbekistan Pro League =

Uzbekistan Pro League
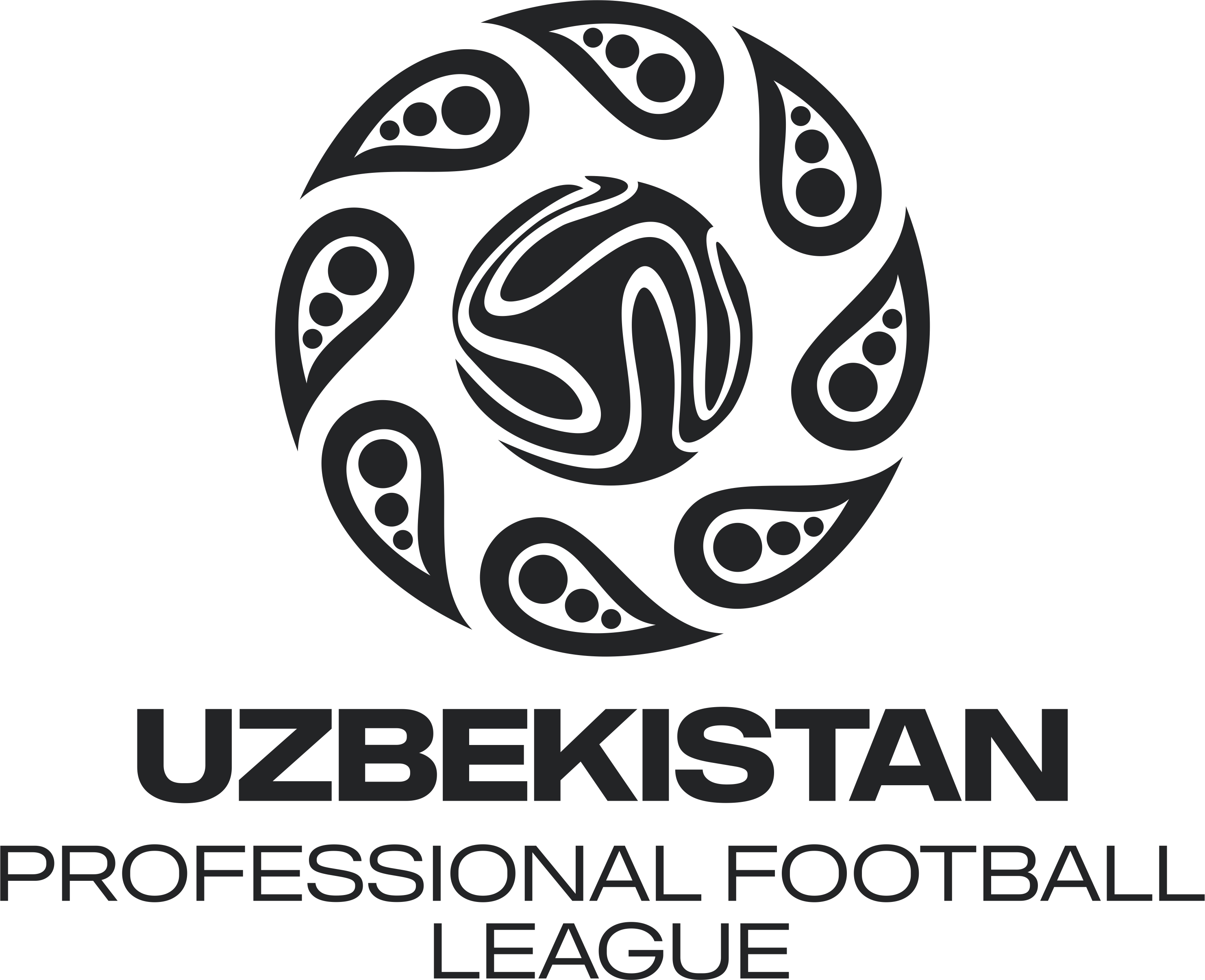
- Season: 2022
- Champions: Andijon
- Relegated: Zomin
- Matches: 130
- Goals: 386 (2.97 per match)
- Top goalscorer: Ruzimboy Akhmedov (23 goals)
- Biggest home win: Yangiyer 9–0 Aral (September 10, 2022)
- Biggest away win: Aral 1–6 Andijon (June 24, 2022)
- Highest scoring: Yangiyer 9–0 Aral (September 10, 2022)
- Longest winning run: Andijon
- Longest losing run: Zomin
- Highest attendance: 18074 (29.04.2022, Bukhara – Khorazm)
- Lowest attendance: 56 (22.10.2022, Yangiyer – Aral)
- All statistics correct as of December 1, 2022.

2022 Uzbekistan Pro League (Uzbek: Футбол бўйича 2022-йилги Ўзбекистон Про лигаси) was a 31st second-level division competition of Uzbekistan Professional Football League. It was held from April to November 2022. Winner of the tournament - FC Andijon qualified for the 2023 Uzbekistan Super League.

== Clubs ==
No.	Club	City	Region	Stadium	Opportunity
1	Andijon	Andijon	Andijon	Bobur Arena	18 600
3	Aral Samalı	Nukus	Karakalpakstan Karakalpakstan	Turon	10 000
2	Buxoro	Bukhara	Buxoro	Buxoro Arena	25 600
4	Mash’al	Muborak	Qashqadaryo	Bahrom Vafoev	10 000
5	Turon	Yaypan	Fargʻona	Uzbekistan	4 000
6	Xorazm	Urganch	Xorazm	Xorazm	13 500
7	Shoʻrtan	Gʻuzor	Qashqadaryo	Gʻuzor	7 000
8	Yangiyer	Yangiyer	Sirdaryo	Yangiyer	13 800
9	Gʻijduvon	Gijduvon	Buxoro	Gʻijduvon	9 300
10	Zomin	Zomin	Jizzax	Zomin	8 460

== Foreign players ==
Klub	Players 1	Players 2	Players 3	Players 4	Players 5	Players 6	AFC players	Former players	Ref
Andijon	(Serbia) Vladimir Bubanja	(Montenegro) Miloyko Goran	(Montenegro) Bogdan Milić						
Aral Samalı									
Buxoro	(Ukraine) Rizvon Ablitarov	(Ukraine) Dmitriy Sidorenko	(Ukraine) Oleg Marchuk	(Serbia) Nikola Z. Stošić			(Tajikistan) (Serbia) Nikola Stosic	(Nigeria) Sunday Song	
Mash’al	(Nigeria) Dare Ojo	(Ukraine) Mykola Ahapov	(Ukraine) Sergey Molochko						
Turon	(South Korea) Kim Bo Yong	(Russia) Sergey Morozov					(Tajikistan) (Russia) Siyovush Habibullayev (Tajikistan) Sharifbek Rahmatov		
Xorazm	(Kamerun) Rocky Marciano Tchatchoua Tchato								
Shoʻrtan									
Yangiyer	(Senegal) (Bosnia and Herzegovina) Secouba Diatta								
Gʻijduvon	(Colombia) Juan Becerra	(Nigeria) Sunday Song							
Zomin									
Sho‘rtan									

== Tournament schedule ==
=== First stage ===
==== First 18 rounds ====
Pos	Team	Pld	W	D	L	GF	GA	GD	Pts	Promotion, qualification or relegation
1	Andijon	18	13	4	1	31	13	+18	43	Advance to the final stage
2	Turon	18	12	2	4	31	19	+12	38	Advance to the final stage
3	Buxoro	18	9	6	3	29	13	+16	33	Advance to the final stage
4	Mash’al	18	8	4	6	32	18	+14	28	Advance to the final stage
5	Xorazm	16	8	4	4	33	26	+7	28	Advance to the final stage
6	Sho‘rtan	18	6	5	7	29	20	+9	23	Transition to the survival phase
7	Yangiyer	18	7	2	9	24	22	+2	23	Transition to the survival phase
8	Aral Samalı	18	4	2	12	13	62	−49	14	Transition to the survival phase
9	Gʻijduvon	18	3	4	11	21	30	−9	13	Transition to the survival phase
10	Zomin	18	2	3	13	17	37	−20	9	Transition to the survival phase

Updated to match(es) played on Iyul 2022-yil. Source: Uzbekistan Professional Football League
Rules for classification: 1) Ochko; 2) Head-to-head points; 3) Head-to-head goal difference; 4) Head-to-head goals scored; 5) Goal difference; 6) Goals scored; .

==== Results table ====
Home \ Away	AND	TUR	BUX	MAS	KHO	SHU	YAN	ARA	GIJ	ZOM
Andijon	—	1–0	0–0	2–1	2–1	2–1	2–0	4–0	2–1	2–1
Turon	1–2	—	2–0	2–1	0–1	1–0	2–0	3–0	1–0	3–1
Buxoro	1–2	2–1	—	2–1	3–2	1–1	3–1	5–0	1–1	1–1
Mash’al	1–2	1–1	2–1	—	1–0	0–2	1–0	1–3	7–0	2–0
Xorazm	3–0	1–1	1–2	1–1	—	3–2	3–1	2–1	3–2	4–1
Sho‘rtan	0–1	1–2	0–0	1–0	3–3	—	4–0	6–0	1–0	4–2
Yangiyer	0–0	0–1	0–1	0–1	3–1	1–1	—	9–0	2–1	1–0
Aral Samalı	1–6	0–3	2–4	0–0	2–1	1–0	1–4	—	2–1	2–1
Gʻijduvon	1–1	1–3	0–2	3–2	0–0	1–1	0–1	5–0	—	3–1
Zomin	0–0	1–2	1–2	1–4	1–3	2–1	0–1	1–1	2–1	—

Updated to match(es) played on Iyul 2023-yil. Source: Uzbekistan Professional Football League
Legend: Blue = home team win; Yellow = draw; Red = away team win.

=== Second stage ===
==== Pro League. 1st-5th places ====
Pos	Team	Pld	W	D	L	GF	GA	GD	Pts	Qualification or relegation
1	Andijon (C)	26	17	6	3	42	25	+17	57	Promotion to 2023 Uzbekistan Super League
2	Buxoro	26	14	8	4	46	13	+33	50	Promotion to 2023 Uzbekistan Super League
3	Turon	26	15	5	6	41	20	+21	50	Promotion to 2023 Uzbekistan Super League play-off
4	Xorazm	26	10	5	11	42	40	+2	35	
5	Mash’al	26	9	6	11	40	33	+7	33	

Updated to match(es) played on 27 November 2022. Source: Soccerway
Rules for classification: 1) Points; 2) Head-to-head points; 3) Head-to-head goal difference; 4) Head-to-head goals scored; 5) Goal difference; 6) Goals scored.
(C) Champions

==== Second stage - high five results ====
Home \ Away	AND	BUX	TUR	KHO	MAS
Andijon		2–1	1–1	3–1	4–2
Buxoro	3–0		1–0	1–0	3–0
Turon	4–0	2–2		2–0	0–0
Xorazm	0–1	2–2	2–1		1–2
Mash’al	0–0	1–2	1–2	2–3	

Updated to match(es) played on November 2022. Source: Soccerway
Legend: Blue = home team win; Yellow = draw; Red = away team win.

==== Pro League. 6th-10th places ====
Pos	Team	Pld	W	D	L	GF	GA	GD	Pts	Qualification or relegation
6	Shoʻrtan	26	11	8	7	49	23	+26	41	
7	Yangiyer	26	10	4	12	35	35	0	34	
8	Gʻijduvon	26	7	8	11	40	36	+4	29	
9	Zomin	26	5	4	17	36	51	−15	19	Relegation to 2023 Uzbekistan First League
10	Aral Samalı	26	4	2	20	15	97	−82	14	Relegation to 2023 Uzbekistan First League

Updated to match(es) played on 20 November 2022. Source: Soccerway
Rules for classification: 1) Points; 2) Head-to-head points; 3) Head-to-head goal difference; 4) Head-to-head goals scored; 5) Goal difference; 6) Goals scored.

==== Second stage - bottom five results ====
Home \ Away	SHU	YAN	GIJ	ZOM	ARA
Shoʻrtan		4–0	1–1	5–0	3–0
Yangiyer	1–1		1–1	3–0	1–0
Gʻijduvon	0–0	4–2		3–0	6–1
Zomin	1–3	3–0	1–1		9–0
Aral Samalı	0–3	0–3	0–3	1–5	

Updated to match(es) played on November 2022. Source: Soccerway
Legend: Blue = home team win; Yellow = draw; Red = away team win.

=== 1 ===
5 March 2022 1	Yangiyer	2–1	Gʻijduvon	Yangiyer
UZT (UTC+5)	Goal	Match report	Goal	Stadium: Yangiyer

5 March 2022 2	Shoʻrtan	1–2	Turon	Gʻuzor
UZT (UTC+5)		Match report	Goal	Stadium: Gʻuzor

6 March 2022 3	Zomin	0–0	Andijon	Zomin
UZT (UTC+5)		Match report		Stadium: Zomin

6 March 2022 4	Buxoro	2–2	Mashʼal	Buxoro
UZT (UTC+5)	Goal	Match report		Stadium: Buxoro FA

6 March 2022 5	Xorazm	2–1	Aral	Urganch
UZT (UTC+5)	Goal	Match report		Stadium: Xorazm Stadium

=== 2 ===
12 March 2022 1	Shoʻrtan	0–0	Buxoro	Gʻuzor
UZT (UTC+5)		Match report		Stadium: G'uzor Stadium

12 March 2022 2	Turon	3–0	Aral	Yaypan
UZT (UTC+5)	Goal	Match report		Stadium: Uzbekistan

13 March 2022 3	Andijon	0–0	Yangiyer	Andijon
UZT (UTC+5)		Match report		Stadium: Bobur

13 March 2022 4	Gʻijduvon	0–0	Xorazm	Buxoro
UZT (UTC+5)		Match report		Stadium: Buxoro

13 March 2022 5	Mashʼal	2–0	Zomin	Muborak
UZT (UTC+5)	Goal	Match report		Stadium: Bahrom Vafoev Stadium

=== 3 ===
19 March 2022 1	Yangiyer	2–1	Gʻijduvon	Yangiyer
UZT (UTC+5)	Goal	Match report	Goal	Stadium: Yangiyer

19 March 2022 2	Shoʻrtan	1–2	Turon	Gʻuzor
UZT (UTC+5)		Match report	Goal	Stadium: G'uzor Stadium

19 March 2022 3	Zomin	0–0	Andijon	Zomin
UZT (UTC+5)		Match report		Stadium: Zomin

20 March 2022 4	Buxoro	2–2	Mashʼal	Buxoro
UZT (UTC+5)	Goal	Match report		Stadium: Buxoro FA

20 March 2022 5	Xorazm	2–1	Aral Samalı	Urganch
UZT (UTC+5)	Goal	Match report		Stadium: Xorazm Stadium

=== 4 ===
26 March 2022 1	Mashʼal	2–1	Xorazm	Muborak
UZT (UTC+5)	Goal	Match report	Goal	Stadium: Bahrom Vafoev Stadium

26 March 2022 2	Turon	1–0	Gʻijduvon	Yaypan
UZT (UTC+5)		Match report	Goal	Stadium: Uzbekistan

27 March 2022 3	Andijon	4–0	Aral	Andijon
UZT (UTC+5)		Match report		Stadium: Bobur

27 March 2022 4	Shoʻrtan	4–0	Yangiyer	Gʻuzor
UZT (UTC+5)	Goal	Match report		Stadium: G'uzor Stadium

27 March 2022 5	Buxoro	1–1	Zomin	Buxoro
UZT (UTC+5)	Goal	Match report		Stadium: Buxoro FA

=== 5 ===
1 April 2022 1	Xorazm	3–2	Shoʻrtan	Urganch
UZT (UTC+5)	Goal	Match report	Goal	Stadium: Urganch

1 April 2022 2	Zomin	1–2	Turon	Zomin
UZT (UTC+5)		Match report	Goal	Stadium: Zomin

2 April 2022 3	Gʻijduvon	1–1	Andijon	Buxoro
UZT (UTC+5)		Match report		Stadium: Buxoro

2 April 2022 4	Yangiyer	0–1	Buxoro	Yangiyer
UZT (UTC+5)	Goal	Match report		Stadium: Yangiyer

2 April 2022 5	Aral	0–0	Mashʼal	Nukus
UZT (UTC+5)		Match report		Stadium: Nukus

=== 6 ===
28 April 2022 1	Mash'al	5–0	Gʻijduvon	Muborak
UZT (UTC+5)		Match report		Stadium: Bahrom Vafoev Stadium

28 April 2022 2	Zomin	0–1	Yangiyer	Yaypan
UZT (UTC+5)	Goal	Match report		Stadium: Uzbekistan

29 April 2022 3	Shoʻrtan	6–0	Aral	Gʻuzor
UZT (UTC+5)		Match report		Stadium: G'uzor Stadium

29 April 2022 4	Turon	1–2	Andijon	Yaypan
UZT (UTC+5)		Match report		Stadium: Uzbekistan

29 April 2022 5	Buxoro	3–2	Xorazm	Buxoro
UZT (UTC+5)	Goal	Match report		Stadium: Buxoro

=== 7 ===
6 May 2022 1	Yangiyer	0–1	Turon	Yangiyer
UZT (UTC+5)	Goal	Match report	Goal	Stadium: Yangiyer

6 May 2022 2	Xorazm	1–2	Zomin	Urganch
UZT (UTC+5)		Match report	Goal	Stadium: Xorazm Stadium

7 May 2022 3	Andijon	2–1	Mashʼal	Andijon
UZT (UTC+5)		Match report		Stadium: Bobur

7 May 2022 4	Gʻijduvon	1–1	Shoʻrtan	Buxoro
UZT (UTC+5)	Goal	Match report		Stadium: Buxoro FA

7 May 2022 5	Aral	2–4	Buxoro	Buxoro
UZT (UTC+5)	Goal	Match report		Stadium: Buxoro

=== 8 ===
13 May 2022 1	Yangiyer	3–1	Xorazm	Yangiyer
UZT (UTC+5)	Goal	Match report	Goal	Stadium: Yangiyer

13 May 2022 2	Shoʻrtan	0–1	Andijon	Gʻuzor
UZT (UTC+5)		Match report	Goal	Stadium: G'uzor Stadium

13 May 2022 3	Zomin	1–1	Aral	Zomin
UZT (UTC+5)		Match report		Stadium: Zomin

14 May 2022 4	Turon	2–1	Mashʼal	Yaypan
UZT (UTC+5)	Goal	Match report		Stadium: Uzbekistan

14 May 2022 5	Buxoro	1–1	Gʻijduvon	Buxoro
UZT (UTC+5)	Goal	Match report		Stadium: Buxoro FA

=== 9 ===
20 May 2022 1	Andijon	0–0	Buxoro	Andijon
UZT (UTC+5)	Goal	Match report	Goal	Stadium: Bobur

20 May 2022 2	Gʻijduvon	3–1	Zomin	Buxoro
UZT (UTC+5)		Match report	Goal	Stadium: Buxoro

21 May 2022 3	Xorazm	1–1	Turon	Urganch
UZT (UTC+5)		Match report		Stadium: Xorazm Stadium

21 May 2022 4	Mashʼal	0–2	Shoʻrtan	Muborak
UZT (UTC+5)	Goal	Match report		Stadium: Bahrom Vafoev Stadium

21 May 2022 5	Aral	1–4	Yangiyer	Nukus
UZT (UTC+5)	Goal	Match report		Stadium: Nukus

=== 10 ===
25 May 2022 1	Aral	2–1	Xorazm	Nukus
UZT (UTC+5)		Match report		Stadium: Nukus

25 May 2022 2	Mashʼal	2–1	Buxoro	Muborak
UZT (UTC+5)	Goal	Match report		Stadium: Bahrom Vafoev Stadium

26 May 2022 3	Gʻijduvon	0–1	Yangiyer	Buxoro
UZT (UTC+5)		Match report		Stadium: Buxoro

26 May 2022 4	Turon	1–0	Shoʻrtan	Yaypan
UZT (UTC+5)		Match report		Stadium: Uzbekistan

27 May 2022 5	Andijon	2–1	Zomin	Andijon
UZT (UTC+5)	Goal	Match report		Stadium: Bobur

=== 11 ===
5 June 2022 1	Aral Samalı	0–3	Turon	Nukus
UZT (UTC+5)	Goal	Match report	Goal	Stadium: Nukus

5 June 2022 2	Yangiyer	0–0	Andijon	Gʻuzor
UZT (UTC+5)		Match report	Goal	Stadium: G'uzor Stadium

5 June 2022 3	Zomin	1–4	Mashʼal	Zomin
UZT (UTC+5)		Match report		Stadium: Zomin

5 June 2022 4	Xorazm	2–2	Gʻijduvon	Urganch
UZT (UTC+5)	Goal	Match report		Stadium: Xorazm Stadium

5 June 2022 5	Buxoro	1–1	Shoʻrtan	Buxoro
UZT (UTC+5)	Goal	Match report		Stadium: Buxoro

=== 12 ===
12 June 2022 1	Andijon	2–1	Xorazm	Andijon
UZT (UTC+5)	Goal	Match report	Goal	Stadium: Bobur

12 June 2022 2	Shoʻrtan	4–2	Zomin	Gʻuzor
UZT (UTC+5)		Match report	Goal	Stadium: G'uzor Stadium

12 June 2022 3	Gʻijduvon	5–0	Aral	Buxoro
UZT (UTC+5)		Match report		Stadium: Buxoro

13 June 2022 4	Mashʼal	1–0	Yangiyer	Muborak
UZT (UTC+5)	Goal	Match report		Stadium: Bahrom Vafoev Stadium

27 March 2022 5	Turon	2–0	Buxoro	Yaypan
UZT (UTC+5)	Goal	Match report		Stadium: Uzbekistan

=== 13 ===
23 June 2022 1	Yangiyer	1–1	Shoʻrtan	Yangiyer
UZT (UTC+5)	Goal	Match report	Goal	Stadium: Yangiyer

23 June 2022 2	Xorazm	1–1	Mashʼal	Urganch
UZT (UTC+5)		Match report	Goal	Stadium: Xorazm Stadium

24 June 2022 3	Zomin	1–2	Buxoro	Zomin
UZT (UTC+5)		Match report		Stadium: Zomin

24 June 2022 4	Aral Samalı	1–6	Andijon	Nukus
UZT (UTC+5)	Goal	Match report		Stadium: Nukus

24 June 2022 5	Gʻijduvon	1–3	Turon	Nukus
UZT (UTC+5)		Match report		Stadium: Nukus

=== 14 ===
5 August 2022 1	Andijon	2–1	Gʻijduvon	Andijon
UZT (UTC+5)		Match report		Stadium: Bobur

5 August 2022 2	Shoʻrtan	3–3	Xorazm	Yaypan
UZT (UTC+5)	Goal	Match report		Stadium: G'uzor Stadium

6 August 2022 3	Mashʼal	7–0	Aral Samalı	Muborak
UZT (UTC+5)		Match report		Stadium: Bahrom Vafoev Stadium

6 August 2022 4	Turon	3–1	Zomin	Yaypan
UZT (UTC+5)		Match report		Stadium: Uzbekistan

6 August 2022 5	Buxoro	3–1	Yangiyer	Buxoro
UZT (UTC+5)	Goal	Match report		Stadium: Buxoro

=== 15 ===
12 August 2022 1	Yangiyer	1–0	Zomin	Yangiyer
UZT (UTC+5)	Goal	Match report	Goal	Stadium: Yangiyer

12 August 2022 2	Gʻijduvon	3–2	Mashʼal	Buxoro
UZT (UTC+5)		Match report	Goal	Stadium: Buxoro

13 August 2022 3	Andijon	1–0	Turon	Andijon
UZT (UTC+5)		Match report		Stadium: Bobur

13 August 2022 4	Aral Samalı	1–0	Shoʻrtan	Nukus
UZT (UTC+5)	Goal	Match report		Stadium: Nukus

4 September 2022 5	Xorazm	1–2	Buxoro	Buxoro
UZT (UTC+5)	Goal	Match report		Stadium: Buxoro

=== 16 ===
22 August 2022 1	Zomin	1–3	Xorazm	Zomin
UZT (UTC+5)	Goal	Match report	Goal	Stadium: Zomin

23 August 2022 2	Buxoro	5–0	Aral Samalı	Buxoro
UZT (UTC+5)		Match report	Goal	Stadium: Buxoro

5 September 2022 3	Shoʻrtan	1–1	Gʻijduvon	Gʻuzor
UZT (UTC+5)		Match report		Stadium: Gʻuzor

6 September 2022 4	Turon	2–1	Yangiyer	Yaypan
UZT (UTC+5)	Goal	Match report		Stadium: Uzbekistan

6 September 2022 5	Mashʼal	1–1	Andijon	Buxoro
UZT (UTC+5)	Goal	Match report		Stadium: Buxoro FA

=== 17 ===
27 August 2022 1	Andijon	2–1	Shoʻrtan	Andijon
UZT (UTC+5)	Goal	Match report	Goal	Stadium: Bobur

27 August 2022 2	Xorazm	3–1	Yangiyer	Yangiyer
UZT (UTC+5)		Match report	Goal	Stadium: Yangiyer

27 August 2022 3	Gʻijduvon	0–2	Buxoro	Gʻijduvon
UZT (UTC+5)		Match report		Stadium: Gʻijduvon

28 August 2022 4	Mashʼal	1–1	Turon	Muborak
UZT (UTC+5)	Goal	Match report		Stadium: Bahrom Vafoev Stadium

28 August 2022 5	Aral Samalı	1–1	Zomin	Buxoro
UZT (UTC+5)	Goal	Match report		Stadium: Buxoro FA

=== 18 ===
10 September 2022 1	Yangiyer	9–0	Aral Samalı	Yangiyer
UZT (UTC+5)	Goal	Match report	Goal	Stadium: Yangiyer

10 September 2022 2	Zomin	2–1	Gʻijduvon	Zomin
UZT (UTC+5)		Match report	Goal	Stadium: Zomin

10 September 2022 3	Turon	0–1	Xorazm	Yaypan
UZT (UTC+5)		Match report		Stadium: Uzbekistan

10 September 2022 4	Buxoro	1–2	Andijon	Buxoro
UZT (UTC+5)	Goal	Match report		Stadium: Buxoro

10 September 2022 5	Shoʻrtan	1–0	Mashʼal	Gʻuzor
UZT (UTC+5)	Goal	Match report		Stadium: G'uzor Stadium

=== 19 ===
6 October 2022 1	Yangiyer	1–1	Gʻijduvon	Yangiyer
UZT (UTC+5)	Goal	Match report		Stadium: Yangiyer

6 October 2022 2	Aral Samalı	0–3	Shoʻrtan	Nukus
UZT (UTC+5)	Goal	Match report		Stadium: Nukus

=== 20 ===
12 October 2022 1	Zomin	9–0	Aral Samalı	Zomin
UZT (UTC+5)	Goal	Match report	Goal	Stadium: Zomin

12 October 2022 2	Shoʻrtan	4–0	Yangiyer	Gʻuzor
UZT (UTC+5)		Match report	Goal	Stadium: G'uzor Stadium

=== 21 ===
16 October 2022 1	Yangiyer	1–0	Zomin	Zomin
UZT (UTC+5)	Goal	Match report	Goal	Stadium: Zomin

16 October 2022 2	Gʻijduvon	0–0	Shoʻrtan	Buxoro
UZT (UTC+5)		Match report		Stadium: Buxoro

=== 22 ===
22 October 2022 1	Zomin	1–1	Gʻijduvon	Zomin
UZT (UTC+5)	Goal	Match report	Goal	Stadium: Zomin

22 October 2022 2	Aral Samalı	0–3	Yangiyer	Nukus
UZT (UTC+5)		Match report		Stadium: Nukus

=== 23 ===
27 October 2022 1	Gʻijduvon	6–1	Aral Samalı	Buxoro
UZT (UTC+5)	Goal	Match report	Goal	Stadium: Buxoro

27 October 2022 2	Shoʻrtan	5–0	Zomin	Gʻuzor
UZT (UTC+5)		Match report		Stadium: G'uzor Stadium

=== 24 ===
2 November 2022 1	Gʻijduvon	4–2	Yangiyer	Yangiyer
UZT (UTC+5)	Goal	Match report	Goal	Stadium: Yangiyer

2 November 2022 2	Shoʻrtan	3–0	Aral Samalı	Nukus
UZT (UTC+5)		Match report		Stadium: Nukus

=== 25 ===
6 November 2022 1	Yangiyer	1–1	Shoʻrtan	Yangiyer
UZT (UTC+5)	Goal	Match report	Goal	Stadium: Yangiyer

6 November 2022 2	Aral Samalı	1–5	Zomin	Nukus
UZT (UTC+5)		Match report		Stadium: Nukus

=== 26 ===
10 November 2022 1	Buxoro	3–0	Andijon	Buxoro
UZT (UTC+5)	Goal	Match report	Goal	Stadium: Buxoro

10 November 2022 2	Xorazm	1–2	Mashʼal	Nukus
UZT (UTC+5)		Match report		Stadium: Nukus

=== 27 ===
16 November 2022 1	Andijon	3–1	Xorazm	Andijon
UZT (UTC+5)	Goal	Match report	Goal	Stadium: Bobur

16 November 2022 2	Mashʼal	1–2	Turon	Muborak
UZT (UTC+5)		Match report		Stadium: Bahrom Vafoev Stadium

=== 28 ===
21 November 2022 1	Turon	4–0	Andijon	Yaypan
UZT (UTC+5)	Goal	Match report	Goal	Stadium: Uzbekistan

21 November 2022 2	Xorazm	2–2	Buxoro	Urganch
UZT (UTC+5)		Match report		Stadium: Xorazm Stadium
