= Uzbekistan District =

Coordinates: 40.3740°N 70.8030°E

Uzbekistan
- District
- Oʻzbekiston tumani
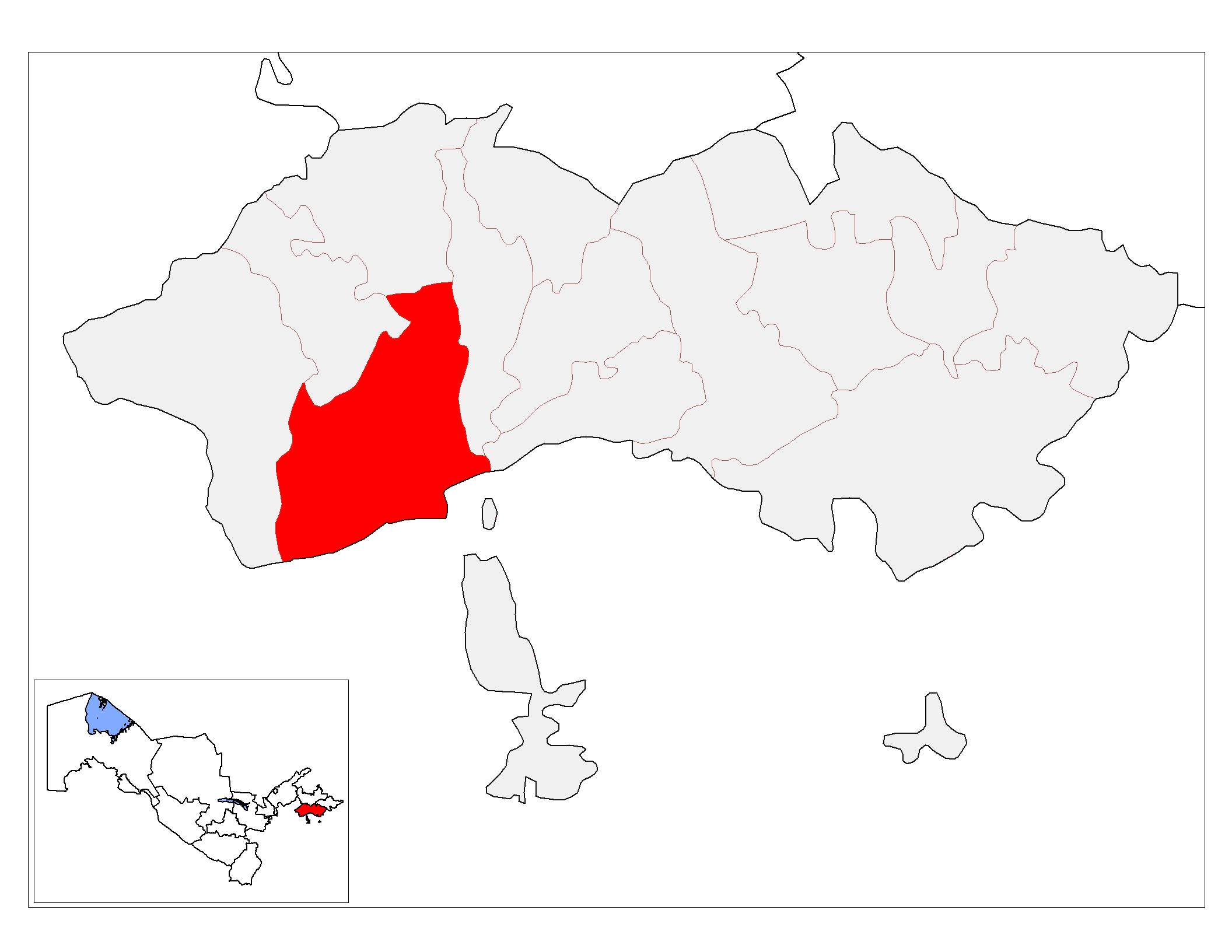
- Country: Uzbekistan
- Region: Fergana Region
- Capital: Yaypan
- Established: 1926

Area
  - Total: 690 km^{2} (270 sq mi)

Population (2022)
  - Total: 246,400
  - Density: 360/km^{2} (920/sq mi)
- Time zone: UTC+5 (UZT)

Uzbekistan District (Uzbek: Oʻzbekiston tumani) is a district of Fergana Region in Uzbekistan. The capital lies at the city Yaypan. It has an area of 690 km^{2} (270 sq mi) and it had 246,400 inhabitants in 2022. The district consists of one city (Yaypan), 22 urban-type settlements (Shoʻrsuv, Avgʻon, Dahana Qaqir, Islom, Katta Tagob, Qizil Qaqir, Kichik Tagob, Sardoba, Kudash, Kul elash, Qulibek, Qumbosti, Qoʻshqoʻnoq, Qoʻrgʻoncha, Nursux, Ovchi, Oyimcha Qaqir, Oqmachit, Oxta Tagob, Oʻqchi Dasht, Oʻqchi Rajabgardi, Iftixor) and 10 rural communities.
