= Shoʻrsuv =

- urban-type settlement
- Location in Uzbekistan
- Coordinates: 40°17′00″N 70°48′06″E
- Country: Uzbekistan
- Region: Fergana Region
- District: Uzbekistan District
- Urban-type settlement status: 1934

Population (2016)
  - Total: 2,400
- Time zone: UTC+5 (UZT)

Shoʻrsuv (Uzbek: Shoʻrsuv/Шўрсув, Russian: Шорсу, romanized: Shorsu) is an urban-type settlement in Fergana Region, Uzbekistan. It is part of Uzbekistan District. The town population was 2,332 people in 1989, and 2,400 in 2016.
