= 2019 Uzbekistan Pro-B League =

- Season: 2019
- Champions: FC Turon
- Promoted: FC Zaamin; FC Turon

The 2019 Uzbekistan Pro-B League is the 2nd since its establishment. The competition started on 11 March 2019.

== Teams and locations ==
Locations of the 2019 Uzbekistan Pro-B League Teams

== League table ==
=== Zone "East" ===
Pos	Team	Pld	W	D	L	GF	GA	GD	Pts	Promotion, qualification or relegation
1	Turon	28	19	5	4	67	23	+44	62	Qualification to Championship Semi-finals
2	Lokomotiv-BFK	28	15	3	10	55	47	+8	48	Qualification to Championship Semi-finals
3	Bunyodkor-2	28	13	7	8	44	29	+15	46	
4	Rash-Milk	28	13	4	11	37	30	+7	43	
5	Rubin	28	10	10	8	36	30	+6	40	
6	Chigatoy	28	8	6	14	39	46	−7	30	
7	Yashnabod	28	7	3	18	39	78	−39	24	Relegation to Uzbekistan Second League
8	Andijan-2	28	6	4	18	33	67	−34	22	Relegation to Uzbekistan Second League

Source: PFL.uz
Rules for classification: 1) Points; 2) Head-to-head points; 3) Head-to-head goal difference; 4) Head-to-head goals scored; 5) Goal difference; 6) Goals scored; .

=== Zone "West" ===
Pos	Team	Pld	W	D	L	GF	GA	GD	Pts	Promotion, qualification or relegation
1	Zaamin	20	15	3	2	53	19	+34	48	Qualification to Championship Semi-finals
2	Yangiyer	20	13	2	5	53	21	+32	41	Qualification to Championship Semi-finals
3	Orol	20	10	3	7	34	34	0	33	
4	Gijduvon	20	8	5	7	29	34	−5	29	
5	Zirabuloq	20	3	2	15	26	48	−22	11	
6	Ittifaq-Navoi	20	3	1	16	19	58	−39	10	
7	Ittifaq-Bukhoro	0	0	0	0	0	0	0	0	Relegation to Uzbekistan Second League
8	Zarangari	0	0	0	0	0	0	0	0	Relegation to Uzbekistan Second League

Source: PFL.uz
Rules for classification: 1) Points; 2) Head-to-head points; 3) Head-to-head goal difference; 4) Head-to-head goals scored; 5) Goal difference; 6) Goals scored; .

== Championship Semi-finals ==
20 November 2019

Zaamin	7–1	Lokomotiv-BFK
Azizov 2' 32' 80'; Qodirov 14'; Ben Konate 38' 90+1'; Pedro Junior 71'	Report	Anderson Willian Franco de Souza 90+3'

20 November 2019

Turon	2–1	Yangiyer
Nasigba John-Jumbo 90+1' 90+4'	Report	Akhmedov 5'

=== FINALS ===
22 November 2019

Zaamin	2–3	Turon
Kingsley Njoku 19'; Avzalov 60'	Report	Djurayev 31'; Nasigba John-Jumbo 45'; Zaykin 80'

Turon and Zaamin qualified for 2020 Uzbekistan Pro League 2020 Uzbekistan Pro League
