= Kim Bo-yong =

Korean association football player

Personal information
- Date of birth: 15 July 1997 (age 29)
- Place of birth: South Korea
- Height: 1.77 m (5 ft 10 in)
- Position: Forward

Youth career
- 2010–2012: Taesung Middle School
- 2013–2015: Taesung High School
- 2016–2018: Soongsil University

Senior career*
Years	Team	Apps	(Gls)
2019	Hwaseong		
2020	Jeonnam Dragons	9	(0)
2021–2022	Turon	27	(2)
2022	Chiangmai	32	(8)
2023–2025	Bucheon FC 1995	10	(8)
2024–2025	→ Jinju Citizen (loan)	37	(6)
- * Club domestic league appearances and goals as of 6 January 2026

- Kim Bo-yong
- Hangul: 김보용
- RR: Gim Boyong
- MR: Kim Poyong

Kim Bo-yong (Korean: 김보용; born 15 July 1997) is a South Korean footballer currently playing as a forward.

== Career statistics ==
=== Club ===
As of match played 27 November 2021.

Club	Season	League			Cup		Other		Total	
Club	Season	Division	Apps	Goals	Apps	Goals	Apps	Goals	Apps	Goals
Soongsil University	2016	-	–		1 (Note: Appearances in the Korean FA Cup)	0	0	0	1	0
Hwaseong	2019	K3 League Advanced	–		2	0	0	0	2	0
Chungnam Asan	2020	K League 2	9	0	1	0	0	0	10	0
Turon	2021	Uzbekistan Super League	22	2	4	2	0	0	26	4
Career total			31	2	8	2	0	0	39	4
