= Islom =

Name list

Islom is an Uzbek given name derived from Islam as a name.

Notable people with the name include:

- Islom Inomov
- Islam Karimov (also known as Islom Karimov)
- Islom Kobilov
- Islom Tukhtakhujaev
- Islom Zoirov
