= Andrey Sidorov =

Uzbekistani footballer

Personal information
- Date of birth: 25 June 1995 (age 31)
- Place of birth: Tashkent, Uzbekistan
- Position: Midfielder

Team information
- Current team: Kokand 1912
- Number: 99

Youth career
- Andijon
- NBU Osiyo
- Pakhtakor

Senior career*
Years	Team	Apps	(Gls)
2016–2019	Pakhtakor	13	(4)
2017	→ Kokand 1912 (loan)	20	(1)
2018	→ Qizilqum (loan)	6	(1)
2018	→ Neftchi (loan)	11	(2)
2019	→ Buxoro (loan)	7	(1)
2020	Khujand	3	(1)
2020	Dinamo Samarqand		
2021–2023	Kokand 1912	1	(0)
2023	FC Arys		
2024-	OshSU Aldier		

International career
2011–2013	Uzbekistan U-17		
2014–2017	Uzbekistan U-20		
2017–2018	Uzbekistan U-23	14	(4)
2018–	Uzbekistan	1	(0)
Medal record
Representing Uzbekistan
Men's football
AFC U-23 Championship
Winner	2018 China	Team
- * Club domestic league appearances and goals as of 09:49, 3 April 2021 (UTC)

Andrey Sidorov (born 25 June 1995) is an Uzbekistani footballer who plays as a midfielder who plays for Kyrgyz Premier League team OshSU Aldier.

== Career ==
=== Club ===
On 1 August 2020, FK Khujand announced the departure of Sidorov.

=== International ===
Sidorov made his debut for the Uzbekistan national football team in May 2018, against Iran in a friendly. He also have played for the Uzbekistan national youth teams in international tournaments such as 2018 AFC U-23 Championship, in which he would win the tournament with Uzbekistan national under-23 football team, with him scoring the extra-time winner in the final after coming on as a substitute.

== Honours ==
=== International ===
- AFC U-23 Championship: 2018
