= PFC Zomin =

Zomin
- Founded: 1996
- Ground: Zomin Stadium; Zomin, Uzbekistan
- Capacity: 4,222
- Coach: Jakhongir Jiyamuroadov
- League: Uzbekistan Pro League
- 2019: 1st
Home colours	Away colours	Third colours

Professional Football Club Zomin is an Uzbekistani football club based in Zomin, Jizzakh Region, Uzbekistan. They play in the second level in Uzbekistani football.

== History ==
The club was founded in 1996. From 2005 to 2011, they participated in the Uzbekistan Second League. Since the 2012 season, they have been playing in the First division of the Uzbekistan Pro League.

During the 2022 season, FC Zomin played in the Pro League.
