= Mirjahon Mirakhmadov =

Uzbekistani footballer

Mirjahon Mirahmadov
Personal information
- Full name: Mirjahon Mirahmadovich Mirahmadov
- Date of birth: 15 July 1997 (age 29)
- Place of birth: Tashkent, Uzbekistan
- Height: 1.85 m (6 ft 1 in)

Team information
- Current team: Dinamo

Senior career*
Years	Team	Apps	(Gls)
2016–2022	Bunyodkor	75	(20)
2017	Obod	4	(0)
2022	Paxtakor	8	(0)
2022–2023	OKMK	37	(6)
2024	Bunyodkor	15	(3)
2025–	Dinamo	0	(0)

International career
2017	Uzbekistan U20	1	(0)
2019–2020	Uzbekistan U23	10	(0)
- * Club domestic league appearances and goals

Mirjahon Mirahmadov (Uzbek: Mirjahon Mirahmadov; born 15 July 1997, Tashkent, Uzbekistan) is an Uzbek professional footballer. He plays as a forward for Dinamo Samarkand.

== Club career ==
=== Bunyodkor ===
Mirahmadov joined Bunyodkor in 2016.

=== Obod ===
Mirahmadov played for Obod on loan from Bunyodkor in 2017. During the 2017 season, he appeared in 3 matches and played 54 minutes in total. He provided 7 assists.

=== Bunyodkor ===
Mirahmadov returned from loan in 2019 and scored 7 goals during the 2019 season. He played 1,853 minutes but did not record any assists. Under the management of Vadim Abramov, Bunyodkor and Mirahmadov won the bronze medals in the 2019 Uzbekistan Super League and qualified for the AFC Champions League. Mirahmadov was named Player of the Season.

=== Paxtakor ===
After scoring four goals against Paxtakor in previous encounters, Mirahmadov signed a two-year contract with the "Lions" as a free agent at the beginning of 2022. He played half of the 2022 season with the club.

=== AGMK ===
As a free agent, Mirahmadov signed a one-and-a-half-year contract with AGMK. He scored a brace against Lokomotiv. At the beginning of the 2024 season, after parting ways with AGMK, he signed a contract with Bunyodkor.

== International career ==
He made one appearance for the Uzbekistan U20 national team. He made his debut for the Uzbekistan U23 national team on 22 March 2019 in a match against India.

== Personal life ==
Mirahmadov is a fan of Edinson Cavani, Zlatan Ibrahimović and Luis Suárez.

== Career statistics ==
=== Club ===
Statistics on the club in goals and ranks competition games
Club	Season	League		Uzbekistan Cup		Other		Asian champions league		Total		Source
Club	Season	App	Goal	App	Goal	App	Goal	App	Goal	App	Goal	Source
Bunyodkor	2016	0	0	0	0	–		–		3	0	
Bunyodkor	2017	3	0	0	0	–						
Obod (loan)	2017	4	0	–		–		–		7	0	
Bunyodkor	2018	11	2	2	0	–		–		0		
Bunyodkor	2019	25	7	3	1	–		–		7		
Bunyodkor	2020	16	3	1	1	–		0	0	4		
Bunyodkor	2021	20	8	4	1	–		–		9		
Bunyodkor	Total	64	18									
Pakhtakor	2022	8	0	–	–	–		3	1	2		
AGMK	2022	12	4	3	1	–		–		3		
AGMK	2023	25	2	5	2	–		7	2			
Total		87	21	7	3			10	3	25		

=== National team ===
Year	Team	Part	Goals
2017	Uzbekistan U20	1	0
2019–2020	Uzbekistan U20	10	0
Jami		11	0

== Honours ==
Bunyodkor

- Uzbekistan Super League bronze medal: 2019
- Uzbekistan Super League Player of the Season: 2019
