= Dmitri Sidorenko =

Russian footballer (born 1973)

Personal information
- Full name: Dmitri Vladimirovich Sidorenko
- Date of birth: 23 March 1973 (age 53)
- Height: 1.79 m (5 ft 10 1/2 in)
- Position: Defender

Senior career*
Years	Team	Apps	(Gls)
1992	FC Niva Slavyansk-na-Kubani	2	(1)
1992–1993	FC Kuban Krasnodar	9	(0)
1993–1994	FC Niva Slavyansk-na-Kubani	42	(2)
1995	FC Kuban Krasnodar	29	(1)
1996–1998	FC Samotlor-XXI Nizhnevartovsk	86	(0)
1999	FC Tyumen	0	(0)
2000–2002	FC Metallurg-Metiznik Magnitogorsk	72	(1)
2003	FC Vityaz Krymsk	26	(0)
2004	FC Avangard Lazarevskoye		
2005	FC Metallurg-Metiznik Magnitogorsk	22	(0)
- * Club domestic league appearances and goals

Dmitri Vladimirovich Sidorenko (Russian: Дмитрий Владимирович Сидоренко; born 23 March 1973) is a Russian former football player.
