= Bahrom Vafoev Stadium =

Uzbek sports stadium

Coordinates: 40°12′49″N 69°16′44″E

Bahrom Vafoev
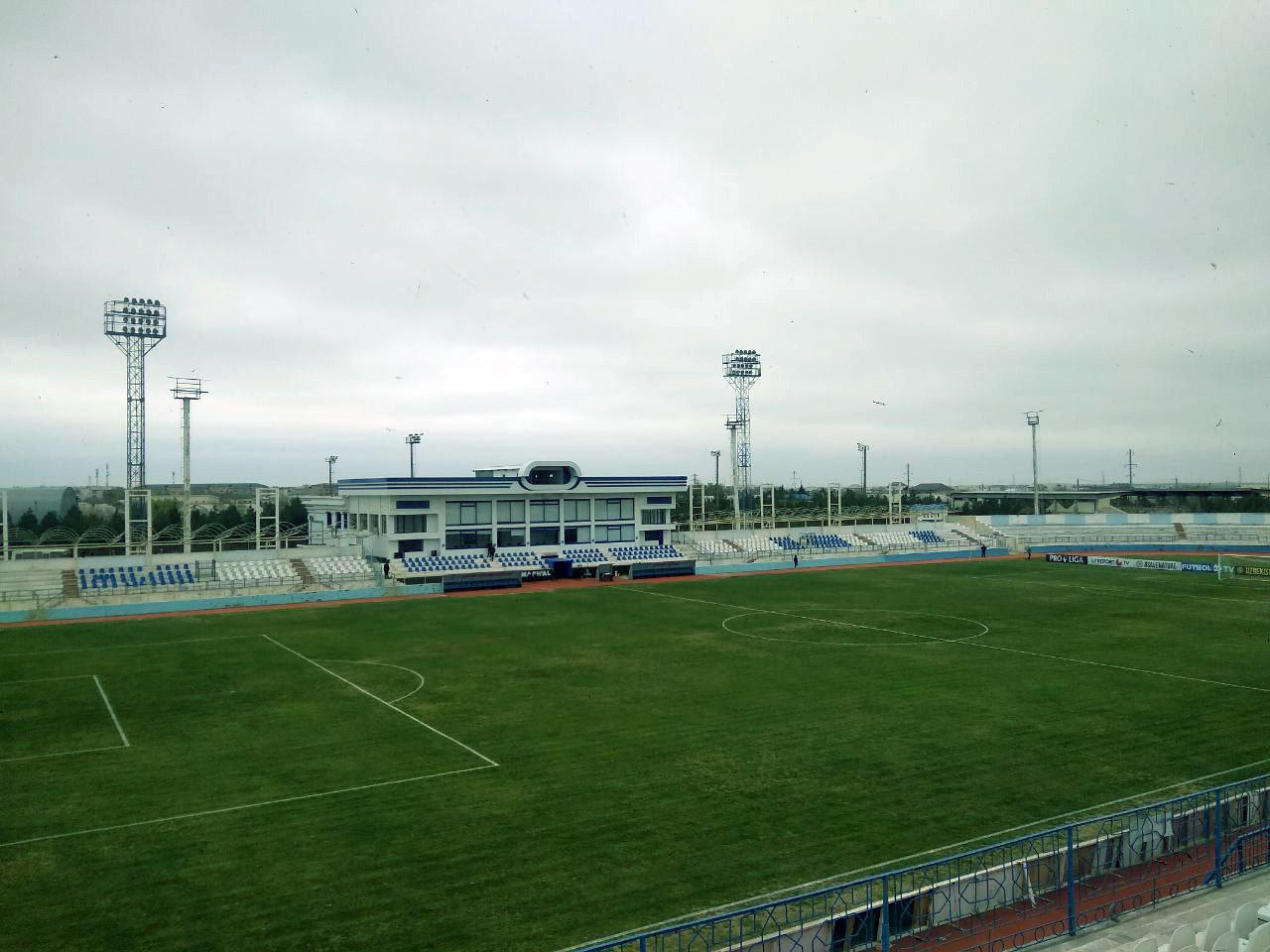
- Interactive map of Bahrom Vafoev
- Full name: Bahrom Vafoev Stadium
- Location: Muborak, Qashqadaryo Region Uzbekistan
- Operator: Uzbekistan Football Association
- Capacity: 7,500 (football)
- Surface: Grass
- Field size: 105x68

Construction
- Built: 1980
- Renovated: 2004
- Expanded: 11,000

Tenant
- Mash'al Mubarek

Bahrom Vafoev Stadium is a multi-use stadium in Mubarek, Uzbekistan. It is currently used mostly for football matches and serves as the home for Mash'al Mubarek, an Uzbeki football club. The stadium holds 7.500 people.
