= Yaypan =

- City
- Location in Uzbekistan
- Coordinates: 40°22′33″N 70°48′56″E
- Country: Uzbekistan
- Region: Fergana Region
- District: Uzbekistan District
- Town status: 1975

Population (2016)
  - Total: 24,900
- Time zone: UTC+5 (UZT)

Yaypan (Uzbek: Yaypan/Яйпан, Russian: Яйпан) is a city in Fergana Region, Uzbekistan. It is the administrative center of Uzbekistan District. The town population was 15,984 people in 1989, and 24,900 in 2016.
