= 2010 FC Bunyodkor season =

FC Bunyodkor
2010 season
- Manager: Luiz Felipe Scolari (until 29 May 2010); Mirjalol Qosimov (from 28 May 2010)
- Uzbek League: Champions
- Uzbekistan Cup: Champions
- AFC Champions League: Last 16 vs Al-Hilal
- Top goalscorer: League: Stevica Ristic (11); All: Stevica Ristic (18)
Home colours	Away colours

The 2010 season was Bunyodkors 4th season in the Uzbek League in Uzbekistan. Bunyodkor competed in Uzbek League, Uzbekistani Cup and AFC Champions League tournaments.

== Squad ==
As of match played 31 October 2010

No.	Name	Nationality	Position	Date of birth (age)	Signed from	Signed in	Contract ends	Apps.	Goals
Goalkeepers
1	Ignatiy Nesterov	(Uzbekistan)	GK	20 June 1983 (aged 27)	Pakhtakor Tashkent	2009		54	0
32	Mukhiddin Khudoyorov	(Uzbekistan)	GK	5 November 1990 (aged 19)	Youth Team	2007		0	0
	Akbar Turaev	(Uzbekistan)	GK	27 August 1989 (aged 21)	Youth Team	2010		1	0
Defenders
3	Goçguly Goçgulyýew	(Turkmenistan)	DF	26 May 1977 (aged 33)	Kairat	2007		73+	11+
4	Hayrulla Karimov	(Uzbekistan)	DF	22 April 1978 (aged 32)	Mash'al Mubarek	2008		57+	3+
6	Anvar Gafurov	(Uzbekistan)	DF	14 May 1982 (aged 28)	Mash'al Mubarek	2009		71	1
13	Aleksandr Khvostunov	(Uzbekistan)	DF	9 January 1974 (aged 36)	Navbahor Namangan	2007		93+	1+
23	Sakhob Juraev	(Uzbekistan)	DF	19 January 1987 (aged 23)	Lokomotiv Tashkent	2007		95+	1+
31	Aleksandr Kovalyov	(Uzbekistan)	DF	24 September 1986 (aged 24)	Metallurg Bekabad	2010		15	0
	Khikmat Khoshimov	(Uzbekistan)	DF	12 November 1979 (aged 30)	Metallurg Bekabad	2010		13	0
Midfielders
7	Azizbek Haydarov	(Uzbekistan)	MF	8 July 1985 (aged 25)	Lokomotiv Tashkent	2007		120+	5+
17	Doniyor Khasanov	(Uzbekistan)	MF	26 February 1990 (aged 21)	Youth Team	2010		4	0
18	Timur Kapadze	(Uzbekistan)	MF	5 September 1981 (aged 29)	Pakhtakor Tashkent	2007		103+	16+
22	Victor Karpenko	(Uzbekistan)	MF	7 September 1977 (aged 33)	Kairat	2007		124+	25+
24	Anzur Ismailov	(Uzbekistan)	MF	21 April 1985 (aged 25)	Pakhtakor Tashkent	2010		39	3
26	Anvar Rakhimov	(Uzbekistan)	MF	20 February 1988 (aged 22)	Xorazm FK Urganch	2007		16+	1+
28	Ruslan Melziddinov	(Uzbekistan)	MF	26 March 1985 (aged 25)	Neftchi Fergana	2009		42	2
	Yannis Mandzukas	(Uzbekistan)	MF	8 April 1984 (aged 26)	Lokomotiv Tashkent	2010		42+	2+
Forwards
9	Anvar Rajabov	(Uzbekistan)	FW	23 January 1988 (aged 22)	Buxoro	2008		18+	3+
15	Miraziz Jalalov	(Uzbekistan)	FW	22 January 1992 (aged 18)	Youth Team	2007		5+	1+
19	Bojan Kaljević	(Montenegro)	FW	25 January 1986 (aged 24)	Metallurg Bekabad	2010		6	0
20	Anvarjon Soliev	(Uzbekistan)	FW	5 February 1978 (aged 32)	Pakhtakor Tashkent	2008		85+	39+
21	Sardor Rashidov	(Uzbekistan)	FW	14 June 1991 (aged 19)	Sogdiana Jizzakh	2010		3	0
44	Rasul Shukhratov	(Uzbekistan)	FW	8 August 1992 (aged 19)	Youth Team	2010		4	0
Out on Loan
9	Shavkat Salomov	(Uzbekistan)	MF	13 November 1985 (aged 24)	Buxoro	2007		81+	17+
19	Jasur Hasanov	(Uzbekistan)	MF	2 August 1983 (aged 27)	Mash'al Mubarek	2007		124+	11+
24	Bahodir Pardaev	(Uzbekistan)	FW	26 April 1987 (aged 23)	Youth Team	2008		15+	3+
30	Server Djeparov	(Uzbekistan)	MF	3 October 1982 (aged 28)	Pakhtakor Tashkent	2008		100+	36+
Players who left during the season
5	Stevica Ristić	(North Macedonia)	FW	23 May 1982 (aged 28)	Jeonbuk Hyundai Motors	2010		23	18
8	Ratinho	(Brazil)	DF	31 May 1986 (aged 24)	Mogi Mirim	2009		61	3
10	Rivaldo	(Brazil)	MF	19 April 1972 (aged 38)	AEK Athens	2008		70+	43+
11	Denilson	(Brazil)	MF	4 September 1976 (aged 34)	Pohang Steelers	2010		26	10
12	Murod Zukhurov	(Uzbekistan)	GK	23 February 1983 (aged 27)	Navbahor Namangan	2008		35+	0
29	João Victor	(Brazil)	MF	7 November 1988 (aged 21)	Treze	2009		63	4

== Transfers ==
On 16 February 2010 in JAR Stadium Conference hall Bunyodkor club management officially presented new signings for the season 2010.

=== In ===
Date	Position	Nationality	Name	From	Fee	Ref.
Winter 2010	FW	(Brazil)	Denilson	Pohang Steelers	Undisclosed	
Winter 2010	FW	(North Macedonia)	Stevica Ristić	Pohang Steelers	Undisclosed	
Winter 2010	DF	(Uzbekistan)	Anzur Ismailov	Pakhtakor Tashkent	Undisclosed	
Winter 2010	DF	(Uzbekistan)	Alexander Kovalyov	Metallurg Bekabad	Undisclosed	
Summer 2009	DF	(Uzbekistan)	Khikmat Khoshimov	Metallurg Bekabad	Undisclosed	
Summer 2009	FW	(Montenegro)	Bojan Kaljević	Metallurg Bekabad	Undisclosed	

=== Out ===
Date	Position	Nationality	Name	To	Fee	Ref.
Winter 2010	DF	(Uzbekistan)	Bakhtiyor Ashurmatov	Xorazm Urganch	Undisclosed	
Winter 2010	FW	(Uzbekistan)	Kamoliddin Murzoev	Nasaf	Undisclosed	
Winter 2010	FW	(Chile)	José Luis Villanueva	Tianjin Teda	Undisclosed	
Winter 2010	GK	(Uzbekistan)	Pavel Bugalo	Andijan	Undisclosed	
Winter 2010	DF	(Uzbekistan)	Abduqahhor Hojiakbarov	Olmaliq	Undisclosed	
Winter 2010	FW	(Uzbekistan)	Ulugbek Bakayev	Tobol	Undisclosed	
Summer 2010	DF	(Brazil)	Ratinho	Mallorca	Undisclosed	
Summer 2010	FW	(North Macedonia)	Stevica Ristić	Amkar Perm	Undisclosed	
Summer 2010	GK	(Uzbekistan)	Murod Zukhurov	Sogdiana Jizzakh	Undisclosed	
Summer 2010	DF	(Uzbekistan)	Abdughahhor Hojiakbarov	Olmaliq	Undisclosed	
Summer 2010	DF	(Uzbekistan)	Shavkat Raimqulov	Shurtan Guzar	Undisclosed	
Summer 2010	FW	(Uzbekistan)	Bahodir Pardaev	Navbahor Namangan	Undisclosed	

=== Loans out ===
Start date	Position	Nationality	Name	To	End date	Ref.
Summer 2010	MF	(Brazil)	João Victor	Mallorca	Winter 2010	
Summer 2010	MF	(Uzbekistan)	Shavkat Salomov	Sogdiana Jizzakh	Winter 2010	
Summer 2010	MF	(Uzbekistan)	Jasur Hasanov	Lekhwiya	Winter 2010	
Summer 2010	MF	(Uzbekistan)	Server Djeparov	FC Seoul	Winter 2010	

=== Released ===
Date	Position	Nationality	Name	Joined	Date
Summer 2009	MF	(Brazil)	Rivaldo	São Paulo	
Summer 2009	FW	(Brazil)	Denilson	Mogi Mirim	

== Preseason ==
During winter break Bunyodkor held a training camp in Dubai between 9 January and the 22nd. During their second training camp, 25 January - 10 February, the club played 3 friendly matches.

=== Friendlies ===
20 January 2010	Bunyodkor (Uzbekistan)	1 – 0	(Ukraine) Metalist Kharkiv	Dubai, UAE
	Ristic

30 January 2010	Bunyodkor (Uzbekistan)	0 – 1	(Russia) Zenit Saint Petersburg	Dubai, UAE
			Rosina

2 February 2010	Bunyodkor (Uzbekistan)	cancelled	(United Arab Emirates) Al Wasl	Dubai, UAE
			Rosina

4 February 2010	Bunyodkor (Uzbekistan)	6 – 1	(Oman) Al Nahda Club	Dubai, UAE

8 February 2010	Bunyodkor (Uzbekistan)	0–0	(United Arab Emirates) Al Jazira Club	Dubai, UAE

== Competitions ==
Bunyodkor was present in all major competitions: Uzbek League, the AFC Champions League and the Uzbek Cup.

=== Uzbek League ===
==== Results ====
14 March 2010 1	Bunyodkor	2 – 1	Pakhtakor Tashkent	Tashkent
16:00 UZT (UTC+5)	Rivaldo 18' (yellow card) 18'; Ristić (yellow card) 57' (goal) 69'	Summary	Ahmedov (yellow card) 56'; Juraev (yellow card) 73'; Miladinović 78'	Stadium: JAR Stadium; Attendance: 9,097; Referee: Ravshan Irmatov

19 March 2010 2	Metallurg Bekabad	0 – 1	Bunyodkor	Bekabad
15:30 UZT (UTC+5)		Summary	Juraev (yellow card) 16'; Denílson 51'; Djeparov (yellow card) 85'	Stadium: Metallurg Bekabad Stadium; Attendance: 10,634; Referee: Olim Talibdjanov

3 April 2010 3	Bunyodkor	1 – 1	Shurtan Guzar	Tashkent
17:00 UZT (UTC+5)	Denílson 45'	Summary	Ponomarev (yellow card) 15'; P.Agboh (yellow card) 69'; Tadjiyev 75' (yellow card) 85'	Stadium: JAR Stadium; Attendance: 6,125; Referee: Rustam Khamidov

9 April 2010 4	Lokomotiv Tashkent	0 – 4	Bunyodkor	Tashkent
16:30 UZT (UTC+5)	Yevgeni Gogol (yellow card) 52'	Summary	Melziddinov (yellow card) 34'; Karimov (yellow card) 53'; Djeparov 60'; Hasanov 64'; Rivaldo 77'; Ristić 90+1'	Stadium: Lokomotiv Stadium; Attendance: 6,010; Referee: Ravshan Irmatov

23 April 2010 6	Bunyodkor	1 – 1	Qizilqum Zarafshon	Tashkent
18:00 UZT (UTC+5)	Hasanov 4'; Ismailov (yellow card) 34'; Karimov (yellow card) 81'; Soliev (yellow card) 88'	Summary	S.Usmankhadjayev 35'; V.Baranov (yellow card) 40'; S.Djuraev (yellow card) 56'; A.Melnichuk (yellow card) 79'	Stadium: JAR Stadium; Attendance: 6,822; Referee: Vadim Agishev

2 May 2010 7	Bunyodkor	1 – 0	Neftchi Farg'ona	Tashkent
17:00 UZT (UTC+5)	Djeparov 63'	Summary	D.Irmatov (yellow card) 52'; Akramov (yellow card) 72'	Stadium: JAR Stadium; Attendance: 6,742; Referee: Bakhtiyor Tagaev

6 May 2010 8	Bunyodkor	2 – 1	Dinamo Samarqand	Tashkent
18:00 UZT (UTC+5)	Ristić 37'; Hasanov (yellow card) 67'; A.Bozorov 70' (o.g.)	Summary	D.Kraev (yellow card) 56'; Irismetov 62'	Stadium: JAR Stadium; Attendance: 6,736; Referee: Valentin Kovalenko

16 May 2010 9	Navbahor Namangan	1 – 2	Bunyodkor	Namangan
16:30 UZT (UTC+5)	S.Mamadaliyev (yellow card) 38'; Sharofetdinov 90+3' (pen.)	Summary	Ismailov (yellow card) 44' (goal) 59'; Denílson (yellow card) 47'; Kapadze 71'; Melziddinov (yellow card) 72'; D.Hasanov (yellow card) 76'	Stadium: Markaziy Stadium; Attendance: 28,979; Referee: Ravshan Irmatov

22 May 2010 10	Bunyodkor	1 – 0	Andijan	Tashkent
18:00 UZT (UTC+5)	Hasanov (yellow card) 8'; Rivaldo 76'	Summary		Stadium: JAR Stadium; Attendance: 5,125; Referee: Viktor Serazetdinov

29 May 2010 11	Olmaliq	1 – 3	Bunyodkor	Olmaliq
17:00 UZT (UTC+5)	A.Shergaziyev (yellow card) 78'; Otakuziev 89'	Summary	Denílson 25'; Ismailov (yellow card) 32'; Rivaldo 52'; Karimov (yellow card) 79'; Haydarov (yellow card) 81'; Soliev 87'	Stadium: Olmaliq Stadium; Attendance: 3,658; Referee: Vadim Agishev

5 June 2010 12	Bunyodkor	3 – 0	Mash'al Mubarek	Tashkent
19:00 UZT (UTC+5)	Rivaldo 13'; Ristić 72'; Djeparov 75'; Karimov (yellow card) 90+2'	Summary	D.Vaniyev (yellow card) 78'	Stadium: JAR Stadium; Attendance: 5,183; Referee: Vladislav Tseytlin

14 June 2010 13	Xorazm	0 – 1	Bunyodkor	Urgench
19:30 UZT (UTC+5)	E.Cavalcante (yellow card) 71'; M.Kurbanov (yellow card) 86'	Summary	Ristić 55'; Djeparov (yellow card) 77'; Soliev (yellow card) 83'	Stadium: Xorazm Stadium; Attendance: 12,255; Referee: Rustam Saidov

28 July 2010 5	Bunyodkor	5 – 0	Nasaf	Tashkent
19:30 UZT (UTC+5)	Karpenko 13'; Haydarov (yellow card) 15'; Denílson 34' (yellow card) 86'; Ristić 57', 80', 82'; Juraev (yellow card) 72'	Summary	Murzoev (yellow card) 50'; Krot (yellow card) 87'	Stadium: JAR Stadium; Attendance: 5,844; Referee: Vadim Agishev

1 August 2010 14	Bunyodkor	4 – 1	Xorazm	Tashkent
19:30 UZT (UTC+5)	Rivaldo 11' (pen.); Ristić 21', 54'; Juraev (yellow card) 40' (goal) 89'; Ismailov (yellow card) 71'; Haydarov (yellow card) 87'	Summary	Ashurmatov (yellow card) 12'; Polvonov 26'	Stadium: JAR Stadium; Attendance: 5,621; Referee: Vladislav Tseytlin

5 August 2010 15	Mash'al Mubarek	0 – 2	Bunyodkor	Muborak
19:00 UZT (UTC+5)	Kuvvatov (yellow card) 60'	Summary	Juraev (yellow card) 30'; K.Khoshimov (yellow card) 34'; Kapadze 67'; Ristić 71'; Haydarov (yellow card) 89'; Gafurov (yellow card) 90+1'	Stadium: Bahrom Vafoev Stadium; Attendance: 3,772; Referee: Ilgiz Tantashev

14 August 2010 16	Bunyodkor	1 – 0	Olmaliq	Tashkent
18:30 UZT (UTC+5)	Rakhimov 56'	Summary		Stadium: JAR Stadium; Attendance: 3,223; Referee: Viktor Serazetdinov

22 August 2010 17	Andijan	0 – 0	Bunyodkor	Andijan
17:30 UZT (UTC+5)	S.Mirkholdirshoyev (yellow card) 59'	Summary	Juraev (yellow card) 61'; Ismailov (yellow card) 63'	Stadium: Soghlom Avlod Stadium; Attendance: 17,167; Referee: Ravshan Irmatov

26 August 2010 18	Bunyodkor	2 – 0	Navbahor Namangan	Tashkent
18:30 UZT (UTC+5)	Karpenko 37'; Kapadze 69'; Ismailov (yellow card) 77'	Summary		Stadium: JAR Stadium; Attendance: 3,109; Referee: Rustam Bobomuradov

12 September 2010 19	Dinamo Samarqand	1 – 2	Bunyodkor	Samarkand
16:30 UZT (UTC+5)	Irismetov (yellow card) 36' (goal) 62'; E.Badullayev (yellow card) 55'; S.Mustafayev (yellow card) 87'	Summary	Melziddinov (yellow card) 27'; Karpenko (yellow card) 72'; Ismailov 77'; Goçgulyýew 83'; B.Kalević (yellow card) 89'	Stadium: Dinamo Samarkand Stadium; Attendance: 10,201; Referee: Sultan Zailobidinov

18 September 2010 20	Neftchi Farg'ona	0 – 3	Bunyodkor	Fergana
18:00 UZT (UTC+5)	I.Babakhanov (yellow card) 4'; Akramov (yellow card) 72'	Summary	Melziddinov (yellow card) 33'; Kapadze 35'; Rajabov (yellow card) 37' (goal) 77', 90+3'; Karpenko (yellow card) 71'; Ismailov (yellow card) 84'	Stadium: Fargona Stadium; Attendance: 15,022; Referee: Vikor Serazetdinov

25 September 2010 21	Qizilqum Zarafshon	1 – 0	Bunyodkor	Navoiy
17:00 UZT (UTC+5)	S.Sharipov (yellow card) 52'; Koshelev 70'; V.Lyubinsky (yellow card) 72'	Summary	Juraev (yellow card) 54'	Stadium: Yoshlar Stadium; Attendance: 4,418; Referee: Vadim Agishev

2 October 2010 22	Nasaf	0 – 1	Bunyodkor	Qarshi
19:00 UZT (UTC+5)	Murzoev (yellow card) 71'	Summary	Kapadze 25'	Stadium: Markaziy Stadium; Attendance: 8,921; Referee: Ravshan Irmatov

16 October 2010 23	Bunyodkor	1 – 0	Lokomotiv Tashkent	Tashkent
17:00 UZT (UTC+5)	Kapadze 52'	Summary	N.Guryanov (yellow card) 43'; D.Djabbarov (yellow card) 87'	Stadium: JAR Stadium; Attendance: 5,122; Referee: Viktor Serazetdinov

21 October 2010 24	Shurtan Guzar	0 – 0	Bunyodkor	G‘uzor
16:30 UZT (UTC+5)	Ponomarev (yellow card) 74'	Summary	Kovalyov (yellow card) 66'	Stadium: G'uzor Stadium; Attendance: 7,612; Referee: Rustam Saidov

26 October 2010 25	Bunyodkor	2 – 1	Metallurg Bekabad	Tashkent
14:30 UZT (UTC+5)	Karpenko 27'; Melziddinov 60'	Summary	S.Yuldashev (yellow card) 14'; Z.Abdullayev 84'	Stadium: JAR Stadium; Attendance: 3,217; Referee: Sultan Zailobidinov

31 October 2010 26	Pakhtakor Tashkent	0 – 0	Bunyodkor	Tashkent
14:30 UZT (UTC+5)	Geynrikh (yellow card) 17'; Magdeev (yellow card) 23'; Ahmedov (yellow card) 58'; Miladinović (yellow card) 71'	Summary	Juraev (yellow card) 14'; Haydarov (yellow card) 71'; Melziddinov (yellow card) 82'	Stadium: Pakhtakor Markaziy Stadium; Attendance: 12,006; Referee: Yousef Al Marzouq

==== League table ====
Pos	Team	Pld	W	D	L	GF	GA	GD	Pts	Qualification or relegation
1	Bunyodkor	26	20	5	1	45	10	+35	65	2011 AFC Champions League group stage (Note: Since Bunyodkor also won the 2010 Uzbekistan Cup, the second-placed team of the league also qualified for the 2011 AFC Champions League.)
2	Pakhtakor Tashkent	26	17	6	3	41	19	+22	57	2011 AFC Champions League group stage
3	Nasaf Qarshi	26	13	7	6	30	20	+10	46	2011 AFC Cup group stage
4	Shurtan Guzar	26	12	6	8	35	28	+7	42	2011 AFC Cup group stage
5	Mash'al Mubarek	26	10	7	9	22	24	−2	37	

Updated to match(es) played on 31 October 2010. Source: PFL
Rules for classification: 1) points; 2) goal difference; 3) number of goals scored.

=== Uzbek Cup ===
18 April 2010 Round of 32	Buxoro	0 – 2	Bunyodkor	Bukhara
17:00 UZT (UTC+5)		Summary	Ristić 40'; Rivaldo 77'	Stadium: Buxoro Arena; Attendance: 8,400; Referee: Bakhtiyor Togaev

10 June 2010 Round of 16 1st leg	Nasaf	1 – 2	Bunyodkor	Qarshi
17:00 UZT (UTC+5)	Murzoev 70'	Summary	Ristić 65'; Djeparov 82'	Stadium: Markaziy Stadium; Attendance: 11,236; Referee: Valentin Kovalenko

18 June 2010 Round of 16 2nd leg	Bunyodkor	1 – 1 (3 – 2 agg.)	Nasaf	Tashkent
17:00 UZT (UTC+5)	B.Қoraev 44' (o.g.)	Summary	Turaev 84'	Stadium: JAR Stadium; Attendance: 7,800; Referee: Rustam Saidov

22 June 2010 Quarterfinal 1st leg	Andijan	1 – 4	Bunyodkor	Andijan
16:30 UZT (UTC+5)	Klishin 23' (yellow card) 52'; Shorakhmedov (yellow card) 28'; T.Yafarov (yellow card) 63'; R.Bayramov (yellow card) 77'	Summary	Ristić 19', 55'; Haydarov 31'; Melziddinov 64'	Stadium: Soghlom Avlod Stadium; Attendance: 3,715; Referee: Bakhtiyor Namazov

26 June 2010 Quarterfinal 2ng leg	Bunyodkor	3 – 1 (7 – 2 agg.)	Andijan	Tashkent
16:30 UZT (UTC+5)	Kapadze 17'; Rakhimov (yellow card) 27'; Karimov (yellow card) 53'; Soliev 60'; João Victor (yellow card) 69'; Ismailov 75'	Summary	Klishin 84'	Stadium: JAR Stadium; Attendance: 3,256; Referee: Murod Mukhammedov

30 June 2010 Semifinal 1st leg	Neftchi	2 – 3	Bunyodkor	Fergana
17:00 UZT (UTC+5)	Berdiev 2', 90+2'; D.Irmatov (yellow card) 19'; S.Askaraliyev (yellow card) 80'; Akramov (yellow card) 87'	Summary	Rivaldo 33', 68'; Ristić 57'; Melziddinov (yellow card) 79'	Stadium: Fargona Stadium; Attendance: 8,231; Referee: Valentin Kovalenko

4 July 2010 Semifinal 2nd leg	Bunyodkor	4 – 1 (7 – 3 agg.)	Neftchi	Tashkent
17:00 UZT (UTC+5)	João Victor 4'; Rivaldo 19'; Karimov (yellow card) 62'; Ristić 67'; Denílson 90+2'	Summary	S.Khakimov (yellow card) 34'; Tukhtakhodjaev (yellow card) 52'; Shodiev (yellow card) 69'; Y.Tsoy (yellow card) 90+3'	Stadium: JAR Stadium; Attendance: 3,925; Referee: Vadim Agishev

==== Final ====
18 August 2010	Bunyodkor	1 – 0	Shurtan Guzar	Tashkent
21:30 UZT (UTC+5)	Ristic 62' (yellow card) 63'; Kalević (yellow card) 66'	Summary		Stadium: Pakhtakor Markaziy Stadium; Attendance: 8,247; Referee: Ravshan Irmatov

=== AFC Champions League ===
==== Group stage ====
Pos	Team	Pld	W	D	L	GF	GA	GD	Pts	Qualification
1	(Iran) Zob Ahan	6	4	1	1	8	3	+5	13	Advance to knockout stage
2	(Uzbekistan) Bunyodkor	6	3	1	2	10	7	+3	10	Advance to knockout stage
3	(Saudi Arabia) Al-Ittihad Jeddah	6	2	2	2	9	7	+2	8	
4	(United Arab Emirates) Al-Wahda	6	1	0	5	3	13	−10	3	

Source: AFC Champions League Official Page

23 February 2010 1	Bunyodkor (Uzbekistan)	3 – 0	(Saudi Arabia) Al-Ittihad	Tashkent, Uzbekistan
16:00 UZT (UTC+5)	Rivaldo 4' (yellow card) 70'; Hasanov 21'; Juraev (yellow card) 50'; Haydarov (yellow card) 57'; Denilson 67'; Ismailov (yellow card) 81'	Summary	Abushgeer (yellow card) 18'; Noor (yellow card) 42'	Stadium: JAR Stadium; Attendance: 7,500; Referee: Ben Williams (Australia)

9 March 2010 2	Al-Wahda (United Arab Emirates)	1 – 2	(Uzbekistan) Bunyodkor	Abu Dhabi, UAE
20:20 UZT (UTC+5)	Matar (yellow card) 24'; Ali (yellow card) 49'; Al-Kuthairi (yellow card) 88' (goal) 90'; Al-Kamali (yellow card) 90'	Summary	Hasanov (yellow card) 25'; Juraev (yellow card) 32'; Denilson 37', 85'; João Victor (yellow card) 43'; Nesterov (yellow card) 90'	Stadium: Al-Nahyan Stadium; Attendance: 5,000; Referee: Abdullah Balideh (Qatar)

24 March 2010 3	Zob Ahan (Iran)	3 – 0	(Uzbekistan) Bunyodkor	Isfahan, Iran
18:30 UZT (UTC+5)	Hosseini 38'; Ghazi 54'; Khalatbari 80'	Summary	Gafurov (yellow card) 71'; Denilson (yellow card) 78'	Stadium: Foolad Shahr Stadium; Attendance: 5,250; Referee: Choi Myung Yong (Korea Republic)

30 March 2010 4	Bunyodkor (Uzbekistan)	0 – 1	(Iran) Zob Ahan	Tashkent, Uzbekistan
17:00 UZT (UTC+5)	Rivaldo (red card) 67'; Gafurov (yellow card) 90+3'	Summary	Khalatbari 29' Hosseini (yellow card) 40'; Haddadifar (yellow card) 43'; Mansouri (yellow card) 69'; Ali Ahmadi (yellow card) 71'; Ashouri (yellow card) 79'	Stadium: JAR Stadium; Attendance: 9,000; Referee: Sun Baojie (China)

14 April 2010 5	Al-Ittihad (Saudi Arabia)	1 – 1	(Uzbekistan) Bunyodkor	Jeddah, Saudi Arabia
22:50 UZT (UTC+5)	Noor 37'; Al-Saqri (yellow card) 38'; Ziaya (yellow card) 64'	Summary	Melziddinov (yellow card) 24'; Ismailov (yellow card) 57'; Soliev 63'	Stadium: Prince Abdullah al-Faisal Stadium; Attendance: 17,500; Referee: Yuichi Nishimura (Japan)

28 April 2010 6	Bunyodkor (Uzbekistan)	4 – 1	(United Arab Emirates) Al-Wahda	Tashkent, Uzbekistan
18:00 UZT (UTC+5)	Rivaldo 28'; Denilson 31', 57' (yellow card) 82'; Karpenko (yellow card) 55'; Haydarov 79'; Nesterov (yellow card) 90'; Gafurov (yellow card) 90'	Summary	Y.Al Hosani (yellow card) 19'; T.Abdullah; (yellow card) 73'; A.Al-Mahrazi (yellow card) 83'; Razzaq 90'	Stadium: JAR Stadium; Attendance: 7,992; Referee: Kim Dong-Jin (Korea Republic)

==== Knockout stage ====
12 May 2010 Round of 16	Al-Hilal (Saudi Arabia)	3 – 0	(Uzbekistan) Bunyodkor	Riyadh, Saudi Arabia
22:45 UZT (UTC+5)	Al-Marshedi 9'; Wilhelmsson 57'; Neves 61'	Summary		Stadium: King Fahd International Stadium; Attendance: 52,129; Referee: Ben Williams (Australia)

== Squad statistics ==
As of match played 31 October 2010

=== Appearances and goals ===
No.	Pos	Nat	Player	Total		Uzbek League		Uzbek Cup		AFC Champions League	
No.	Pos	Nat	Player	Apps	Goals	Apps	Goals	Apps	Goals	Apps	Goals
1	GK	(Uzbekistan) UZB	Ignatiy Nesterov	37	0	24	0	7	0	6	0
3	DF	(Turkmenistan) TKM	Goçguly Goçgulyýew	9	1	7+1	1	1	0	0	0
4	DF	(Uzbekistan) UZB	Hayrulla Karimov	13	0	3+1	0	7	0	2	0
6	DF	(Uzbekistan) UZB	Anvar Gafurov	30	0	19+2	0	1+2	0	6	0
7	MF	(Uzbekistan) UZB	Azizbek Haydarov	37	2	24	0	5+1	1	7	1
9	FW	(Uzbekistan) UZB	Anvar Rajabov	9	2	6+3	2	0	0	0	0
13	DF	(Uzbekistan) UZB	Alexandr Khvostunov	12	0	9+2	0	1	0	0	0
15	FW	(Uzbekistan) UZB	Miraziz Jalolov	2	0	0+2	0	0	0	0	0
17	MF	(Uzbekistan) UZB	Doniyor Khasanov	4	0	4	0	0	0	0	0
18	MF	(Uzbekistan) UZB	Timur Kapadze	38	7	17+7	6	7	1	2+5	0
19	FW	(Montenegro) MNE	Bojan Kaljević	6	0	4+1	0	1	0	0	0
20	FW	(Uzbekistan) UZB	Anvarjon Soliev	16	3	0+8	1	1+1	1	2+4	1
21	FW	(Uzbekistan) UZB	Sardor Rashidov	3	0	0+1	0	0+2	0	0	0
22	MF	(Uzbekistan) UZB	Victor Karpenko	36	3	14+8	3	3+4	0	7	0
23	DF	(Uzbekistan) UZB	Sakhob Juraev	31	1	22	1	4	0	5	0
24	MF	(Uzbekistan) UZB	Anzur Ismailov	39	3	25	2	8	1	6	0
26	MF	(Uzbekistan) UZB	Anvar Rakhimov	10	1	1+5	1	1+1	0	0+2	0
28	MF	(Uzbekistan) UZB	Ruslan Melziddinov	27	2	13+6	1	2+3	1	1+2	0
31	DF	(Uzbekistan) UZB	Aleksandr Kovalyov	15	0	3+4	0	4+1	0	1+2	0
44	FW	(Uzbekistan) UZB	Rasul Shukhratov	4	0	0+4	0	0	0	0	0
	GK	(Uzbekistan) UZB	Akbar Turaev	1	0	0	0	0+1	0	0	0
	DF	(Uzbekistan) UZB	Khikmat Khoshimov	13	0	10+2	0	0+1	0	0	0
	MF	(Uzbekistan) UZB	Yannis Mandzukas	12	0	2+9	0	0+1	0	0	0
Players away on loan:
9	MF	(Uzbekistan) UZB	Shavkat Salomov	5	0	0+1	0	0+1	0	0+3	0
19	MF	(Uzbekistan) UZB	Jasur Hasanov	16	3	4+3	2	2	0	7	1
30	MF	(Uzbekistan) UZB	Server Djeparov	23	4	11	3	5	1	7	0
Players who left Bunyodkor during the season:
5	FW	(North Macedonia) MKD	Stevica Ristić	23	18	12+4	11	6+1	7	0	0
8	DF	(Brazil) BRA	Ratinho	21	0	14	0	6+1	0	0	0
10	MF	(Brazil) BRA	Rivaldo	22	12	11	6	6	4	5	2
11	MF	(Brazil) BRA	Denílson	26	10	13+1	4	4+2	1	6	5
12	GK	(Uzbekistan) UZB	Murod Zukhurov	4	0	2	0	1	0	1	0
29	MF	(Brazil) BRA	João Victor	22	1	11	0	5	1	6	0

=== Goal scorers ===
Place	Position	Nation	Number	Name	Uzbek League	Uzbekistan Cup	AFC Champions League	Total
1	FW	(North Macedonia)	5	Stevica Ristić	11	7	0	18
2	MF	(Brazil)	10	Rivaldo	6	4	2	12
3	MF	(Brazil)	11	Denílson	4	1	5	10
4	MF	(Uzbekistan)	18	Timur Kapadze	6	1	0	7
5	MF	(Uzbekistan)	30	Server Djeparov	3	1	0	4
5	MF	(Uzbekistan)	22	Victor Karpenko	3	0	0	3
5	MF	(Uzbekistan)	19	Jasur Hasanov	2	0	1	3
5	MF	(Uzbekistan)	24	Anzur Ismailov	2	1	0	3
9	FW	(Uzbekistan)	9	Anvar Rajabov	2	0	0	2
9	MF	(Uzbekistan)	28	Ruslan Melziddinov	1	1	0	2
9	FW	(Uzbekistan)	20	Anvarjon Soliev	1	1	1	2
9	MF	(Uzbekistan)	7	Azizbek Haydarov	0	1	1	2
9				Own goal	1	1	0	2
14	DF	(Uzbekistan)	23	Sakhob Juraev	1	0	0	1
14	MF	(Uzbekistan)	26	Anvar Rakhimov	1	0	0	1
14	DF	(Turkmenistan)	3	Goçguly Goçgulyýew	1	0	0	1
14	MF	(Brazil)	29	João Victor	0	1	0	1
				TOTALS	45	20	10	75

=== Disciplinary record ===
Number	Nation	Position	Name	Uzbek League		Uzbekistan Cup		AFC Champions League		Total	
Number	Nation	Position	Name	Yellow card	Red card	Yellow card	Red card	Yellow card	Red card	Yellow card	Red card
1	(Uzbekistan)	GK	Ignatiy Nesterov	0	0	0	0	2	0	2	0
4	(Uzbekistan)	DF	Hayrulla Karimov	4	0	0	0	0	0	4	0
6	(Uzbekistan)	DF	Anvar Gafurov	1	0	0	0	3	0	4	0
7	(Uzbekistan)	MF	Azizbek Haydarov	5	0	0	0	1	0	6	0
9	(Uzbekistan)	FW	Anvar Rajabov	1	0	0	0	0	0	1	0
19	(Montenegro)	FW	Bojan Kaljević	1	0	0	0	0	0	1	0
20	(Uzbekistan)	FW	Anvarjon Soliev	2	0	0	0	0	0	2	0
22	(Uzbekistan)	MF	Victor Karpenko	2	0	0	0	1	0	3	0
23	(Uzbekistan)	DF	Sakhob Juraev	7	0	0	0	2	0	9	0
24	(Uzbekistan)	MF	Anzur Ismailov	7	0	0	0	2	0	9	0
28	(Uzbekistan)	MF	Ruslan Melziddinov	5	0	0	0	1	0	6	0
31	(Uzbekistan)	DF	Aleksandr Kovalyov	1	0	0	0	0	0	1	0
	(Uzbekistan)	DF	Khikmat Khoshimov	1	0	0	0	0	0	1	0
	(Uzbekistan)	MF	Doniyor Khasanov	1	0	0	0	0	0	1	0
Players away on loan:
19	(Uzbekistan)	MF	Jasur Hasanov	2	0	0	0	1	0	2	0
30	(Uzbekistan)	MF	Server Djeparov	2	0	0	0	0	0	2	0
Players who left Bunyodkor during the season:
5	(North Macedonia)	FW	Stevica Ristić	1	0	0	0	0	0	1	0
10	(Brazil)	MF	Rivaldo	1	0	0	0	1	1	2	1
11	(Brazil)	MF	Denílson	2	0	0	0	2	0	4	0
29	(Brazil)	MF	João Victor	0	0	1	0	0	0	1	0
			TOTALS	46	0	0	0	17	1	63	1
