= 2012 FC Bunyodkor season =

FC Bunyodkor
2012 season
- Chairman: (Uzbekistan) Tulagan Djuraev
- Manager: (Uzbekistan) Mirjalol Kasymov
- Uzbek League: 2nd
- Uzbekistan Cup: Champions
- AFC Champions League: Semi-finals vs Ulsan Hyundai
- Top goalscorer: League: Anvarjon Soliev (7); All: Anvarjon Soliev (13)
- Highest home attendance: 7,341 vs Pakhtakor; 26 June 2012
- Lowest home attendance: 201 vs Mash'al Mubarek; 9 July 2012
- Average home league attendance: 3,179 4 October 2012
Home colours	Away colours

The 2012 season was Bunyodkors 6th season in the Uzbek League in Uzbekistan, and they also competed in the Uzbekistan Cup and the AFC Champions League. Bunyodkor reached the Semi-Finals of the AFC Champions League before being beaten 5–1 on aggregate by Ulsan Hyundai of South Korea.

== Club ==
=== Current technical staff ===
Position	Name
Manager	(Uzbekistan) Mirjalol Kasymov
Assistant coach	(Uzbekistan) Hikmat Irgashev
Assistant coach	(Ukraine) Amet Memet
Fitness coach	(Uzbekistan) Alexander Volkov
Goalkeeping coach	(Uzbekistan) Abdusattar Rakhimov

== Squad ==
As of match played 30 November 2012

No.	Name	Nationality	Position	Date of birth (age)	Signed from	Signed in	Contract ends	Apps.	Goals
Goalkeepers
1	Ignatiy Nesterov	(Uzbekistan)	GK	20 June 1983 (aged 29)	Pakhtakor Tashkent	2009		134	0
25	Zafar Safaev	(Uzbekistan)	GK	24 June 1991 (aged 21)	Youth Team	2012		0	0
35	Viktor Mochalov	(Uzbekistan)	GK	8 February 1991 (aged 21)	Youth Team	2012		0	0
45	Akbar Turaev	(Uzbekistan)	GK	27 August 1989 (aged 23)	Youth Team	2010		6	0
Defenders
2	Akmal Shorakhmedov	(Uzbekistan)	DF	22 April 1978 (aged 34)	Andijon	2011		63	5
4	Hayrulla Karimov	(Uzbekistan)	DF	22 April 1978 (aged 34)	Mash'al Mubarek	2008		125+	5+
5	Dilshod Juraev	(Uzbekistan)	DF	21 April 1992 (aged 20)	Youth Team	2011		10	0
6	Anvar Gafurov	(Uzbekistan)	DF	14 May 1982 (aged 30)	Mash'al Mubarek	2009		140	4
16	Artyom Filiposyan	(Uzbekistan)	DF	18 July 1989 (aged 23)	Nasaf	2012		36	1
18	Slavoljub Đorđević	(Serbia)	DF	15 February 1981 (aged 31)	Red Star Belgrade	2011		40	0
23	Sakhob Juraev	(Uzbekistan)	DF	19 January 1987 (aged 25)	Lokomotiv Tashkent	2007		137+	2+
26	Javlon Mirabdullaev	(Uzbekistan)	DF	19 March 1994 (aged 18)	Youth Team	2012		0	0
29	Abduqahhor Hojiakbarov	(Uzbekistan)	DF	18 July 1989 (aged 23)	Olmaliq	2012		3+	0+
30	Kamoliddin Tadjibaev	(Uzbekistan)	DF	19 January 1990 (aged 22)	Youth Team	2012		0	0
Midfielders
8	Jovlon Ibrokhimov	(Uzbekistan)	MF	13 November 1985 (aged 27)	Lokomotiv Tashkent	2011		65	5
10	Shavkat Salomov	(Uzbekistan)	MF	13 November 1985 (aged 27)	Buxoro	2007		153+	30+
13	Lutfulla Turaev	(Uzbekistan)	MF	30 March 1988 (aged 24)	Nasaf	2012		43	7
14	Alibobo Rakhmatullaev	(Uzbekistan)	MF	8 February 1991 (aged 21)	Youth Team	2012		16	1
19	Jasur Hasanov	(Uzbekistan)	MF	2 August 1983 (aged 29)	Mash'al Mubarek	2007		141+	13+
22	Victor Karpenko	(Uzbekistan)	MF	7 September 1977 (aged 35)	Kairat	2007		198+	37+
28	Ruslan Melziddinov	(Uzbekistan)	MF	26 March 1985 (aged 27)	Neftchi Fergana	2009		79	5
33	Ján Kozák	(Slovakia)	MF	22 April 1980 (aged 32)	AEL	2012		36	7
Forwards
9	Ilkhom Shomurodov	(Uzbekistan)	FW	28 March 1984 (aged 28)	Nasaf	2012		7	0
11	Rasul Shukhratov	(Uzbekistan)	FW	8 August 1992 (aged 20)	Youth Team	2010		8	1
15	Miraziz Jalalov	(Uzbekistan)	FW	22 January 1992 (aged 20)	Youth Team	2007		6+	1+
17	Kamoliddin Murzoev	(Uzbekistan)	FW	17 February 1987 (aged 25)	Nasaf	2011		71	9
20	Anvarjon Soliev	(Uzbekistan)	FW	5 February 1978 (aged 34)	Pakhtakor Tashkent	2008		152+	63+
21	Sardor Rashidov	(Uzbekistan)	FW	14 June 1991 (aged 21)	Sogdiana Jizzakh	2010		3	0
24	Bahodir Pardaev	(Uzbekistan)	FW	26 April 1987 (aged 25)	Youth Team	2008		40+	10+
Players who left during the season
7	David Carney	(Australia)	DF	30 November 1983 (aged 29)	AD Alcorcón	2012		12	1
9	Anvar Rajabov	(Uzbekistan)	FW	23 January 1988 (aged 24)	Buxoro	2008		50+	9+
11	Emil Kenzhesariyev	(Kyrgyzstan)	DF	26 March 1987 (aged 25)	Aktobe	2012		13	0
19	Yannis Mandzukas	(Uzbekistan)	MF	8 April 1984 (aged 28)	Lokomotiv Tashkent	2010		58+	7+
25	Nodir Ibrakhimov	(Uzbekistan)	GK	22 June 1986 (aged 26)	Yangiyer	2012		0	0

== Transfers ==
=== In ===
Date	Position	Nationality	Name	From	Fee	Ref.
Winter 2012	GK	(Uzbekistan)	Nodir Ibrakhimov	Yangiyer	Undisclosed	
Winter 2012	DF	(Kyrgyzstan)	Emil Kenzhesariyev	Aktobe	Undisclosed	
Winter 2012	DF	(Uzbekistan)	Artyom Filiposyan	Nasaf	Undisclosed	
Winter 2012	DF	(Uzbekistan)	Abduqahhor Hojiakbarov	Olmaliq	Undisclosed	
Winter 2012	DF	(Australia)	David Carney	AD Alcorcón	Undisclosed	
Winter 2012	MF	(Slovakia)	Ján Kozák	AEL	Undisclosed	
Winter 2012	MF	(Uzbekistan)	Lutfulla Turaev	Nasaf	Undisclosed	
Winter 2012	MF	(Uzbekistan)	Sardor Sabirkhodjaev	Pakhtakor Tashkent	Undisclosed	
Summer 2012	GK	(Uzbekistan)	Zafar Safaev	Bunyodkor-2	Undisclosed	
Summer 2012	MF	(Uzbekistan)	Jasur Hasanov	Emirates	Undisclosed	
Summer 2012	FW	(Uzbekistan)	Rasuljon Shukhratov	Yangiyer	Undisclosed	

=== Loans in ===
Start date	Position	Nationality	Name	To	End date	Ref.
Summer 2012	FW	(Uzbekistan)	Ilkhom Shomurodov	Nasaf	Winter 2013	

=== Out ===
Date	Position	Nationality	Name	To	Fee	Ref.
Summer 2011	DF	(Uzbekistan)	Islom Inomov	Lokomotiv Tashkent	Undisclosed	
Summer 2011	MF	(Uzbekistan)	Asqar Jadigerov	Buriram United	Undisclosed	
Summer 2011	DF	(Kyrgyzstan)	Emil Kenzhesariyev	Aktobe	Undisclosed	
Summer 2011	MF	(Uzbekistan)	Yannis Mandzukas	Mash'al Mubarek	Undisclosed	
Summer 2011	FW	(Uzbekistan)	Anvar Rajabov	Buriram United	Undisclosed	

=== Loans out ===
Start date	Position	Nationality	Name	To	End date	Ref.
Winter 2012	MF	(Uzbekistan)	Anvar Rakhimov	Andijan	Winter 2013	

=== Released ===
Date	Position	Nationality	Name	Joined	Date
Winter 2012	DF	(Serbia)	Saša Đorđević		
Winter 2012	MF	(Serbia)	Uroš Milosavljević	Donji Srem	
Summer 2012	GK	(Uzbekistan)	Nodir Ibrakhimov		
19 September 2012	DF	(Australia)	David Carney	New York Red Bulls	8 August 2013

=== Trial ===
Date From	Date To	Position	Nationality	Name	Last club	Ref.
January 2012	February 2012	DF	(Nigeria)	David Oniya	Dinamo Samarqand	
January 2012	February 2012	MF	(Belarus)	Dzmitry Rekish	Dinamo Minsk	
January 2012	February 2012	MF	(The Gambia)	Ebrima Sohna	Sandefjord	
January 2012	February 2012	MF	(Nigeria)	Paul Obiefule	Hønefoss	
January 2012	February 2012	MF	(Uzbekistan)	Ilkhom Boydedaev		
January 2012	February 2012	FW	(Serbia)	Danilo Belić	Astana	
January 2012	February 2012	FW	(Serbia)	Dragan Bogavac	Astana	

== Friendly matches ==
=== Preseason ===
29 December 2011 Friendly	Bunyodkor	1 – 0	Lokomotiv Tashkent	Tashkent
UTC+5	Soliev (pen.)	(Report)

29 December 2011 Friendly	Bunyodkor	5 – 0	Lokomotiv Tashkent	Tashkent
UTC+5	Pardaev (4); Shukhratov	(Report)

9 January 2012 Friendly	Bunyodkor	0 – 0	FC Shurtan Guzar	Tashkent
12:00 UTC+5		(Report)

9 January 2012 Friendly	Bunyodkor	2 – 2	FC Shurtan Guzar	Tashkent
14:00 UTC+5	Soliev (pen.); Soliev	(Report)	Klishin; Khazigaliev

15 January 2012 Friendly	VfL Wolfsburg (Germany)	1 – 1	(Uzbekistan) Bunyodkor	Dubai
UTC+04:00	Lopes 9'		50' Salomov

4 February 2012 Friendly	Bunyodkor (Uzbekistan)	1 – 1	(Czech Republic) FC Baník Ostrava	Antalya
	Rakhmatullaev 50'	Report	10' Cverna

7 February 2012 Friendly	Bunyodkor (Uzbekistan)	1 – 1	(Kazakhstan) FC Shakhter Karagandy	Antalya
11:00 UTC+02:00	Obiefule 50'	Report	57' Borantayev

7 February 2012 Friendly	Bunyodkor (Uzbekistan)	2 – 2	(Ukraine) FC Metalurh Zaporizhya	Antalya
17:00 UTC+02:00	Pardaev 30'; Pardaev 43'	Report	49' Godoi; 86' Kovalevski

10 February 2012 Friendly	Bunyodkor (Uzbekistan)	0 – 2	(Kazakhstan) FC Shakhter Karagandy	Antalya
11:30 UTC+02:00		Report	60' Borantayev; 62' (o.g.) Boydedaev

10 February 2012 Friendly	Bunyodkor (Uzbekistan)	1 – 2	(Kazakhstan) FC Shakhter Karagandy	Antalya
16:30 UTC+02:00	Karpenko 58'	Report	21' Vičius; 50' Baizhanov

12 February 2012 Friendly	Bunyodkor (Uzbekistan)	0 – 0	(Belarus) Shakhtyor Soligorsk	Antalya
UTC+02:00		Report

25 February 2012 Friendly	Bunyodkor (Uzbekistan)	1 – 1	(Saudi Arabia) Al-Ittihad	Dubai
	Soliev	Report	Al-Rashid

2012 Match World Cup

Team	Pld	W	D	L	GF	GA	GD	Pts
(Russia) Zenit St. Petersburg	2	2	0	0	4	2	+2	6
(Uzbekistan) Bunyodkor	2	1	0	1	2	2	0	3 (Note: Bunyodkor got the second place spot and Iraq u23 got the third place after a draw.)
Iraq U-23	2	1	0	1	2	2	0	3
(Switzerland) Neuchâtel Xamax	2	0	0	2	0	2	−2	0

Notes:

18 January 2012 Match World Cup	FC Zenit (Russia)	2 - 1	(Uzbekistan) Bunyodkor	Maktoum Bin Rashid Al Maktoum Stadium, Dubai
17:00 UTC+04:00	Huszti 13'; Bukharov 41'	Report	Murzoev 87'	Referee: Abdulla Nagi

20 January 2012 Match World Cup	Bunyodkor (Uzbekistan)	1 - 0	(Switzerland) Neuchâtel Xamax	Maktoum Bin Rashid Al Maktoum Stadium, Dubai
17:00 UTC+04:00	73' Pardaev	Report

23 January 2011 Match WC, 3rd place	Bunyodkor (Uzbekistan)	1 – 1 (5 – 4 p)	(Ukraine) Shakhtar Donetsk	Maktoum Bin Rashid Al Maktoum Stadium
	Pardaev 18'	Report	61' Douglas Costa	Attendance: 250

=== Mid-season ===
6 June 2012	Bunyodkor	2 - 1	Metallurg Bekabad	JAR Stadium, Tashkent
	Soliev; Pardaev (pen.)		M.Ikramov (pen.)

25 July 2012	Bunyodkor	2 - 1	Navbahor Namangan	JAR Stadium, Tashkent
	Pardaev; Soliev (pen.)	Report	Irismetov (pen.)

== Competitions ==
Bunyodkor was present in all major competitions: Uzbek League, the AFC Champions League and the Uzbek Cup.

=== Uzbek League ===
==== Results summary ====
Overall								Home						Away					
Pld	W	D	L	GF	GA	GD	Pts	W	D	L	GF	GA	GD	W	D	L	GF	GA	GD
26	17	6	3	41	16	+25	57	10	3	0	20	4	+16	7	3	3	21	12	+9

Last updated: 19 November 2012.
Source: Soccerway

==== Results by round ====
Round	1	2	3	4	5	6	7	8	9	10	11	12	13	14	15	16	17	18	19	20	21	22	23	24	25	26
Ground	H	A	H	A	H	H	A	H	A	H	A	H	A	H	A	H	A	H	A	H	A	A	H	A	H	A
Result	W	D	W	L	D	W	W	W	W	D	W	W	W	D	D	W	D	W	L	W	W	L	W	W	W	W
Position	2	3	1	2	3	2	2	2	1	1	1	1	1	1	1	1	1	1	1	1	1	3	2	2	2	2

Source: Soccerway
A = Away; H = Home; W = Win; D = Draw; L = Loss

==== Results ====
15 March 2012 1	Bunyodkor	1 - 0	Mash'al Mubarek	JAR Stadium, Tashkent
17:00 UZT (UTC+5)	Filiposyan 90'	Summary		Attendance: 753

26 March 2012 2	Qizilqum Zarafshon	2 - 2	Bunyodkor	Progress Stadium, Zarafshon
17:00 UZT (UTC+5)	Kagirov 44'; Babakulov 89'	Summary	Soliev 11' (pen.); Pardaev 77'	Attendance: 4,687

8 April 2012 3	Bunyodkor	3 - 0	Shurtan Guzar	JAR Stadium, Tashkent
19:00 UZT (UTC+5)	Pardaev 19'; Salomov 74'; Soliev 85'	Summary		Attendance: 3,862

12 April 2012 4	Navbahor Namangan	2 - 1	Bunyodkor	Kosonsoy, Kosonsoy Markaziy Stadium
17:30 UZT (UTC+5)	Fomenka 25'; Fomenka 52'	Report	4' Melziddinov	Attendance: 5,701; Referee: Marat Ismailov

21 April 2012 5	Bunyodkor	1 - 1	Lokomotiv Tashkent	JAR Stadium, Tashkent
19:00 UZT (UTC+5)	Kozák 16'	Summary	Rakhmatullaev 3'	Attendance: 4,365

26 April 2012 6	Bunyodkor	3 - 1	Metallurg Bekabad	JAR Stadium, Tashkent
19:00 UZT (UTC+5)	Soliev 42', 89'; Carney 76'	Summary	Nurmatov 90+1'	Attendance: 2,154

8 May 2012 7	Buxoro	0 - 4	Bunyodkor	Bukhoro Sport Majmuasi Bukhoro
19:00 UZT (UTC+5)		Summary	Tarasenko 4' (o.g.); Karpenko 32'; Shorakhmedov 61'; Melziddinov 66'	Attendance: 16,353

11 May 2012 8	Bunyodkor	2 - 0	Olmaliq	JAR Stadium, Tashkent
19:00 UZT (UTC+5)	Kozák 16'; Salomov 38'	Summary		Attendance: 432

21 May 2012 9	Samarqand-Dinamo	0 - 1	Bunyodkor	Olimpia Stadium, Samarkand
18:00 UZT (UTC+5)		Summary	Salomov 60'	Attendance: 13,236

15 June 2012 10	Bunyodkor	0 - 0	Nasaf Qarshi	JAR Stadium, Tashkent
20:00 UZT (UTC+5)		Summary		Attendance: 3,977

21 June 2012 11	Neftchi Farg'ona	1 - 2	Bunyodkor	Farghona Stadium, Ferghana
20:00 UZT (UTC+5)	Berdiev 47'	Summary	Turaev 34'; Ibrokhimov 61'	Attendance: 13,280

26 June 2012 12	Bunyodkor	2 - 0	Pakhtakor	JAR Stadium, Tashkent
20:00 UZT (UTC+5)	Salomov 53'; Kozák 64'	Summary		Attendance: 7,341

30 June 2012 13	Andijan	0 - 2	Bunyodkor	Soghlom Avlod Stadium, Andijon
19:00 UZT (UTC+5)		Summary	Salomov 42'; Kozák 55'	Attendance: 6,241

4 August 2012 14	Bunyodkor	0 - 0	Andijan	JAR Stadium, Tashkent
20:00 UZT (UTC+5)		Summary		Attendance: 2,123

8 August 2012 15	Pakhtakor	1 - 1	Bunyodkor	Pakhtakor Stadium, Tashkent
20:00 UZT (UTC+5)	Andreev 70'	Summary	Salomov 15'; Karimov (yellow card) 67' (yellow-red card) 69'	Attendance: 7,000

18 August 2012 16	Bunyodkor	2 - 1	Neftchi Farg'ona	JAR Stadium, Tashkent
19:00 UZT (UTC+5)	Gafurov 6'; Karpenko 8'	Summary	Berdiev 36'	Attendance: 1,426

26 August 2012 17	Nasaf Qarshi	0 - 0	Bunyodkor	Qarshi Stadium, Qarshi
19:30 UZT (UTC+5)		Summary		Attendance: 2,122

3 September 2012 18	Bunyodkor	2 - 1	Samarqand-Dinamo	JAR Stadium, Tashkent
19:00 UZT (UTC+5)	Hasanov 53'; Soliev 57'	Summary	Ahmedov 40' (pen.)	Attendance: 521

13 September 2012 19	Olmaliq	2 - 1	Bunyodkor	Metallurg Stadium, Olmaliq
17:30 UZT (UTC+5)	Polvonov 31', 47'	Summary	Turaev 52'	Attendance: 3,285

24 September 2012 20	Bunyodkor	1 - 0	Buxoro	JAR Stadium, Tashkent
18:00 UZT (UTC+5)	Shorahmedov 70'	Summary		Attendance: 511; Referee: Marat Ismailov

27 September 2012 21	Metallurg Bekabad	1 - 3	Bunyodkor	Metallurg Bekabad Stadium, Bekabad
16:00 UZT (UTC+5)	Nurmatov 85'	Summary	Kozák 17'; Karimov (red card) 45'; Soliev 58', 69'	Attendance: 6,000; Referee: Bakhtiyor Namozov

8 October 2012 22	Lokomotiv Tashkent	3 - 1	Bunyodkor	Lokomotiv Stadium, Tashkent
16:00 UZT (UTC+5)	Fomenka 83', 88'	Summary	Karpenko 3'	Attendance: 3,812; Referee: Ravshan Irmatov

19 October 2012 23	Bunyodkor	1 - 0	Navbahor Namangan	JAR Stadium, Tashkent
18:00 UZT (UTC+5)	Murzoev 90+2'	Summary	A.Sultonov (yellow card) 13' (yellow-red card) 88'	Attendance: 573; Referee: Rustam Bobomuradov

5 November 2012 24	Shurtan Guzar	0 - 1	Bunyodkor	G'uzor Stadium, G‘uzor
15:30 UZT (UTC+5)		Summary	Pardaev 3' (pen.)	Attendance: 4,021; Referee: Valentin Kovalenko

17 November 2012 25	Bunyodkor	3 - 0	Qizilqum Zarafshon	JAR Stadium, Tashkent
14:00 UZT (UTC+5)	Karpenko 4'; Pardaev 12'; Ibrokhimov 74'	Summary		Attendance: 1,235; Referee: Bakhtiyor Namazov

21 November 2012 26	Mash'al Mubarek	0 - 2	Bunyodkor	Bahrom Vafoev Stadium, Muborak
14:00 UZT (UTC+5)		Summary	Murzoev 44'; Pardaev 69'	Attendance: 7,204; Referee: Khasan Ruziev

==== League table ====
Pos	Team	Pld	W	D	L	GF	GA	GD	Pts	Qualification or relegation
1	Pakhtakor Tashkent (Q, C)	26	18	5	3	51	16	+35	59	2013 AFC Champions League Group stage (Note: Lokomotive Tashkent qualified due to Bunyodkor also winning the 2012 Uzbekistan Cup.)
2	Bunyodkor (Q)	26	17	6	3	42	16	+26	57	2013 AFC Champions League Group stage
3	Lokomotiv Tashkent (Q)	26	14	7	5	43	22	+21	49	2013 AFC Champions League Qualifying play-off
4	Nasaf Qarshi	26	14	7	5	37	20	+17	49	
5	Shurtan Guzar	26	12	4	10	38	33	+5	40	

Updated to match(es) played on 21 November 2012. Source: Uzbekistan Professional Football League
Rules for classification: 1) points; 2) goal difference; 3) number of goals scored.
(C) Champions; (Q) Qualified for the phase indicated

=== Uzbek Cup ===
==== Matches ====
29 March 2012 Round of 32	Nasaf-2	0 - 5	Bunyodkor	Nasaf-2 Stadium
16:00 UTC+5		Summary; Report	Soliev 49', 59', 84'; Pardaev 70', 88'	Attendance: 38

11 June 2012 Round of 16 1st Leg	Bunyodkor	2 - 0	Shurtan Guzar	JAR Stadium
19:00 UTC+5	Kozák 45', 81'	Summary; Report		Attendance: 3,702

5 July 2012 Round of 16 2nd Leg	Shurtan Guzar	0 - 1 (0 - 3 agg.)	Bunyodkor	G'uzor Stadium
19:00 UTC+5		Summary	Melziddinov 83'	Attendance: 7,635

9 July 2012 Quarterfinal 1st Leg	Bunyodkor	3 - 0	Mash'al Mubarek	JAR Stadium
19:00 UTC+5	Turaev 18', 36'; Salomov 68'	Summary		Attendance: 201

29 July 2012 Quarterfinal 2nd Leg	Mash'al Mubarek	0 - 0 (0 - 3 agg.)	Bunyodkor	Yangiyer Stadium, Yangiyer
19:00 UTC+5		Summary		Attendance: 4,104

22 August 2012 Semifinal 1st Leg	Bunyodkor	1 - 1	Pakhtakor	JAR Stadium, Tashkent
19:00 UTC+5	Soliev 42'	Summary	Andreev 21' (pen.)	Attendance: 2,544

24 November 2012 Semifinal 2nd Leg	Pakhtakor	1 - 3 (2 - 4 agg.)	Bunyodkor	Pakhtakor Stadium, Tashkent
12:00 UTC+5	T.Abdukholiqov 73'	Summary	Shorahmedov 53'; Salomov 54', 77'	Attendance: 7,301; Referee: Ravshan Irmatov

30 November 2012 Final	Bunyodkor	3 - 0	Nasaf Qarshi	Pakhtakor Stadium
15:00 UTC+5	Salomov 8'; Murzoev 34'; Karpenko 45'	Details		Attendance: 7,000; Referee: Irmatov Ravshan

=== AFC Champions League ===
==== Group stage ====
Pos	Team	Pld	W	D	L	GF	GA	GD	Pts	Qualification	ADE	BYD	POH	GMB
1	(Australia) Adelaide United	6	4	1	1	7	2	+5	13	Advance to knockout stage	—	0–0	1–0	2–0
2	(Uzbekistan) Bunyodkor	6	3	1	2	8	7	+1	10	Advance to knockout stage	1–2	—	1–0	3–2
3	(South Korea) Pohang Steelers	6	3	0	3	6	4	+2	9		1–0	0–2	—	2–0
4	(Japan) Gamba Osaka	6	1	0	5	5	13	−8	3		0–2	3–1	0–3	—

Source: WorldFootball.net

6 March 2012 1	Bunyodkor (Uzbekistan)	1 - 2	(Australia) Adelaide United	JAR Stadium, Tashkent
17:00 UTC+05:00	Murzoev 90+4'	Report; Summary	Boogaard 13'; Golec 53'	Attendance: 7,000; Referee: Andre El Haddad (Lebanon)

20 March 2012 2	Pohang Steelers (South Korea)	0 - 2	(Uzbekistan) Bunyodkor	Pohang Steel Yard, Pohang
UTC+09:00		Report; Summary	Turaev 28'; Murzoev 77'	Attendance: 3,449; Referee: Ali Hamad Madhad Saif Al Badwawi (UAE)

3 April 2012 3	Gamba Osaka (Japan)	3 - 1	(Uzbekistan) Bunyodkor	Osaka Expo '70 Stadium, Osaka
TBC UTC+09:00	Endo 14'; Rafinha 58' (pen.), 77' (pen.)	Report; Summary	Soliev 89'	Attendance: 6,100; Referee: Chaiya Mahapab (Thailand)

18 April 2012 4	Bunyodkor (Uzbekistan)	3 - 2	(Japan) Gamba Osaka	JAR Stadium, Tashkent
18:00 UTC+05:00	Murzoev 15'; Turaev 43'; Soliev 85'	Report; Summary	Kurata 20'; Abe 90+5'	Attendance: 4,000; Referee: Khalil Al Ghamdi (Saudi Arabia)

2 May 2012 5	Adelaide United (Australia)	0 - 0	(Uzbekistan) Bunyodkor	Hindmarsh Stadium, Adelaide
20:30 UTC+09:30		Report; Summary		Attendance: 7,794; Referee: Liu Kwok Man (Hong Kong)

16 May 2012 6	Bunyodkor (Uzbekistan)	1 - 0	(South Korea) Pohang Steelers	JAR Stadium, Tashkent
TBC UTC+05:00	Gafurov 48'	Report; Summary		Attendance: 5,100; Referee: Abdullah Al Bloushi (Qatar)

==== Knockout stage ====
29 May 2012 Last 16	Seongnam Ilhwa Chunma (South Korea)	0 - 1	(Uzbekistan) Bunyodkor	Tancheon Sports Complex, Seongnam
19:30 UTC+09:00		Report; Summary	Karimov 53' (pen.)	Attendance: 3,808; Referee: Mohsen Torky (Iran)

19 September 2012 Quarter-Finals 1st Leg	Adelaide United (Australia)	2 - 2	(Uzbekistan) Bunyodkor	Hindmarsh Stadium, Adelaide
15:00 UTC+05:00	Ramsay 8'; Kostopoulos 18'; Boogaard (red card) 42'	Summary; Report	Hasanov 44'; Salomov 75'	Referee: Abdullah Al Hilali (Oman)

3 October 2012 Quarter-Finals 2nd Leg	Bunyodkor (Uzbekistan)	3 - 2 (a.e.t.) (5 - 4 agg.)	(Australia) Adelaide United	JAR Stadium, Tashkent
19:00 UTC+05:00	Turaev 20'; Shorakhmedov 73'; Gafurov (yellow card) 88' (red card) 101'; Rakhmatullaev 114'	Summary	Ramsay 4'; Neumann 64'; Barbiero (yellow card) 69' (red card) 90'; Fyfe (yellow card) 85' (yellow-red card) 120'	Attendance: 7,212; Referee: Ali Abdulnabi (Bahrain)

24 October 2012 Semi-Finals 1st Leg	Bunyodkor (Uzbekistan)	1 - 3	(South Korea) Ulsan Hyundai	JAR Stadium, Tashkent
18:00 UTC+05:00	Ibrokhimov 5'	Summary; Report	Rafinha 31'; Shin-Wook 53'; Keun-Ho 72'	Attendance: 7,500; Referee: Ali Al-Badwawi (UAE)

31 October 2012 Semi-Finals 2nd Leg	Ulsan Hyundai (South Korea)	2 - 0 (5 - 1 agg.)	(Uzbekistan) Bunyodkor	Ulsan Munsu Football Stadium, Ulsan
15:30 UTC+05:00	Shin-Wook 53'; Keun-Ho 73'	Summary [ Report]		Referee: Abdulrahman Abdou (Qatar)

== Squad statistics ==
As of match played 30 November 2012

=== Appearances and goals ===
No.	Pos	Nat	Player	Total		Uzbek League		Uzbek Cup		AFC Champions League	
No.	Pos	Nat	Player	Apps	Goals	Apps	Goals	Apps	Goals	Apps	Goals
1	GK	(Uzbekistan) UZB	Ignatiy Nesterov	45	0	26+0	0	8+0	0	11+0	0
2	DF	(Uzbekistan) UZB	Akmal Shorakhmedov	36	4	20+1	2	7+0	1	8+0	1
4	DF	(Uzbekistan) UZB	Hayrulla Karimov	41	1	22+0	0	8+0	0	11+0	1
5	DF	(Uzbekistan) UZB	Dilshod Juraev	5	0	0+2	0	0+2	0	0+1	0
6	MF	(Uzbekistan) UZB	Anvar Gafurov	34	2	15+2	1	7+1	0	9+0	1
8	MF	(Uzbekistan) UZB	Jovlon Ibrokhimov	35	2	20+1	1	5+0	0	8+1	1
9	FW	(Uzbekistan) UZB	Ilkhom Shomurodov	7	0	5+0	0	0+1	0	0+1	0
10	MF	(Uzbekistan) UZB	Shavkat Salomov	40	11	18+4	6	4+3	4	6+5	1
13	MF	(Uzbekistan) UZB	Lutfulla Turaev	43	7	24+0	2	7+1	2	11+0	3
14	MF	(Uzbekistan) UZB	Alibobo Rakhmatullaev	16	1	1+5	0	0+5	0	0+5	1
15	FW	(Uzbekistan) UZB	Miraziz Jalalov	0	0	0+0	0	0+0	0	0+0	0
16	DF	(Uzbekistan) UZB	Artyom Filiposyan	36	1	20+0	1	7+0	0	9+0	0
17	FW	(Uzbekistan) UZB	Kamoliddin Murzoev	39	6	14+8	2	5+1	1	10+1	3
18	DF	(Serbia) SRB	Slavoljub Đorđević	7	0	4+1	0	1+0	0	1+0	0
19	MF	(Uzbekistan) UZB	Jasur Hasanov	17	2	5+5	1	3+0	0	4+0	1
20	FW	(Uzbekistan) UZB	Anvarjon Soliev	32	13	11+8	7	3+2	4	1+7	2
21	MF	(Uzbekistan) UZB	Sardor Rashidov	0	0	0+0	0	0+0	0	0+0	0
22	MF	(Uzbekistan) UZB	Viktor Karpenko	40	4	23+0	3	7+0	1	10+0	0
23	MF	(Uzbekistan) UZB	Sakhob Juraev	22	0	15+1	0	0+3	0	3+0	0
24	FW	(Uzbekistan) UZB	Bahodir Pardaev	25	7	3+13	5	2+3	2	1+3	0
25	GK	(Uzbekistan) UZB	Nodir Ibrakhimov	0	0	0+0	0	0+0	0	0+0	0
26	DF	(Uzbekistan) UZB	Javlon Mirabdullaev	0	0	0+0	0	0+0	0	0+0	0
28	MF	(Uzbekistan) UZB	Ruslan Melziddinov	28	3	5+13	2	5+0	1	1+4	0
33	MF	(Slovakia) SVK	Ján Kozák	36	7	19+3	5	3+2	2	9+0	0
35	GK	(Uzbekistan) UZB	Viktor Mochalov	0	0	0+0	0	0+0	0	0+0	0
44	FW	(Uzbekistan) UZB	Rasuljon Shukhratov	0	0	0+0	0	0+0	0	0+0	0
45	GK	(Uzbekistan) UZB	Akbar Turaev	1	0	0+1	0	0+0	0	0+0	0
Players who appeared for Bunyodkor no longer at the club:
7	MF	(Australia) AUS	David Carney	12	1	2+2	1	2+1	0	5+0	0
9	FW	(Uzbekistan) UZB	Anvar Rajabov	3	0	0+1	0	0+0	0	0+2	0
11	DF	(Kyrgyzstan) KGZ	Emil Kenzhesariev	13	0	3+3	0	1+0	0	3+3	0
19	MF	(Uzbekistan) UZB	Yannis Mandzukas	1	0	0+0	0	1+0	0	0+0	0

=== Goal scorers ===
Place	Position	Nation	Number	Name	Uzbek League	Uzbekistan Cup	AFC Champions League	Total
1	FW	(Uzbekistan)	20	Anvarjon Soliev	7	4	2	13
2	MF	(Uzbekistan)	10	Shavkat Salomov	6	4	1	11
3	MF	(Slovakia)	33	Ján Kozák	5	2	0	7
3	FW	(Uzbekistan)	24	Bahodir Pardaev	5	2	0	7
3	MF	(Uzbekistan)	13	Lutfulla Turaev	2	2	3	7
6	FW	(Uzbekistan)	17	Kamoliddin Murzoev	2	1	3	6
7	MF	(Uzbekistan)	22	Viktor Karpenko	4	1	0	5
8	DF	(Uzbekistan)	2	Akmal Shorakhmedov	2	1	1	4
9	MF	(Uzbekistan)	28	Ruslan Melziddinov	2	1	0	3
9	MF	(Uzbekistan)	8	Jovlon Ibrokhimov	2	0	1	3
11	MF	(Uzbekistan)	6	Anvar Gafurov	1	0	1	2
11	MF	(Uzbekistan)	19	Jasur Hasanov	1	0	1	2
13	DF	(Uzbekistan)	16	Artyom Filiposyan	1	0	0	1
13	MF	(Australia)	7	David Carney	1	0	0	1
13	DF	(Uzbekistan)	4	Hayrulla Karimov	0	0	1	1
13	DF	(Uzbekistan)	14	Alibobo Rakhmatullaev	0	0	1	1
13				Own goal	1	0	0	1
				TOTALS	42	18	15	75

=== Disciplinary record ===
Number	Nation	Position	Name	Uzbek League		Uzbekistan Cup		AFC Champions League		Total	
Number	Nation	Position	Name	Yellow card	Red card	Yellow card	Red card	Yellow card	Red card	Yellow card	Red card
1	(Uzbekistan)	GK	Ignatiy Nesterov	1	0	0	0	0	0	1	0
2	(Uzbekistan)	DF	Akmal Shorakhmedov	0	0	0	0	2	0	2	0
4	(Uzbekistan)	DF	Hayrulla Karimov	9	2	1	0	1	0	11	2
5	(Uzbekistan)	DF	Dilshod Juraev	0	0	1	0	1	0	2	0
6	(Uzbekistan)	MF	Anvar Gafurov	2	0	2	0	2	1	6	1
8	(Uzbekistan)	MF	Javlon Ibrokhimov	2	0	1	0	1	0	4	0
9	(Uzbekistan)	FW	Ilkhom Shomurodov	1	0	0	0	0	0	1	0
10	(Uzbekistan)	MF	Shavkat Salomov	6	0	1	0	0	0	7	0
13	(Uzbekistan)	MF	Lutfulla Turaev	7	0	3	0	1	0	11	0
16	(Uzbekistan)	DF	Artyom Filiposyan	6	0	2	0	2	0	10	0
17	(Uzbekistan)	FW	Kamoliddin Murzoev	2	0	1	0	2	0	5	0
18	(Serbia)	DF	Slavoljub Đorđević	1	0	0	0	0	0	1	0
19	(Uzbekistan)	MF	Jasur Hasanov	1	0	0	0	1	0	2	0
20	(Uzbekistan)	FW	Anvarjon Soliev	0	0	1	0	0	0	1	0
23	(Uzbekistan)	MF	Sakhob Juraev	3	0	0	0	2	0	5	0
24	(Uzbekistan)	FW	Bahodir Pardaev	1	0	0	0	0	0	1	0
28	(Uzbekistan)	MF	Ruslan Melziddinov	1	0	0	0	0	0	1	0
33	(Slovakia)	MF	Ján Kozák	0	0	1	0	1	0	2	0
			TOTALS	45	2	12	0	16	1	73	3
