= 2010 Uzbekistan Cup final =

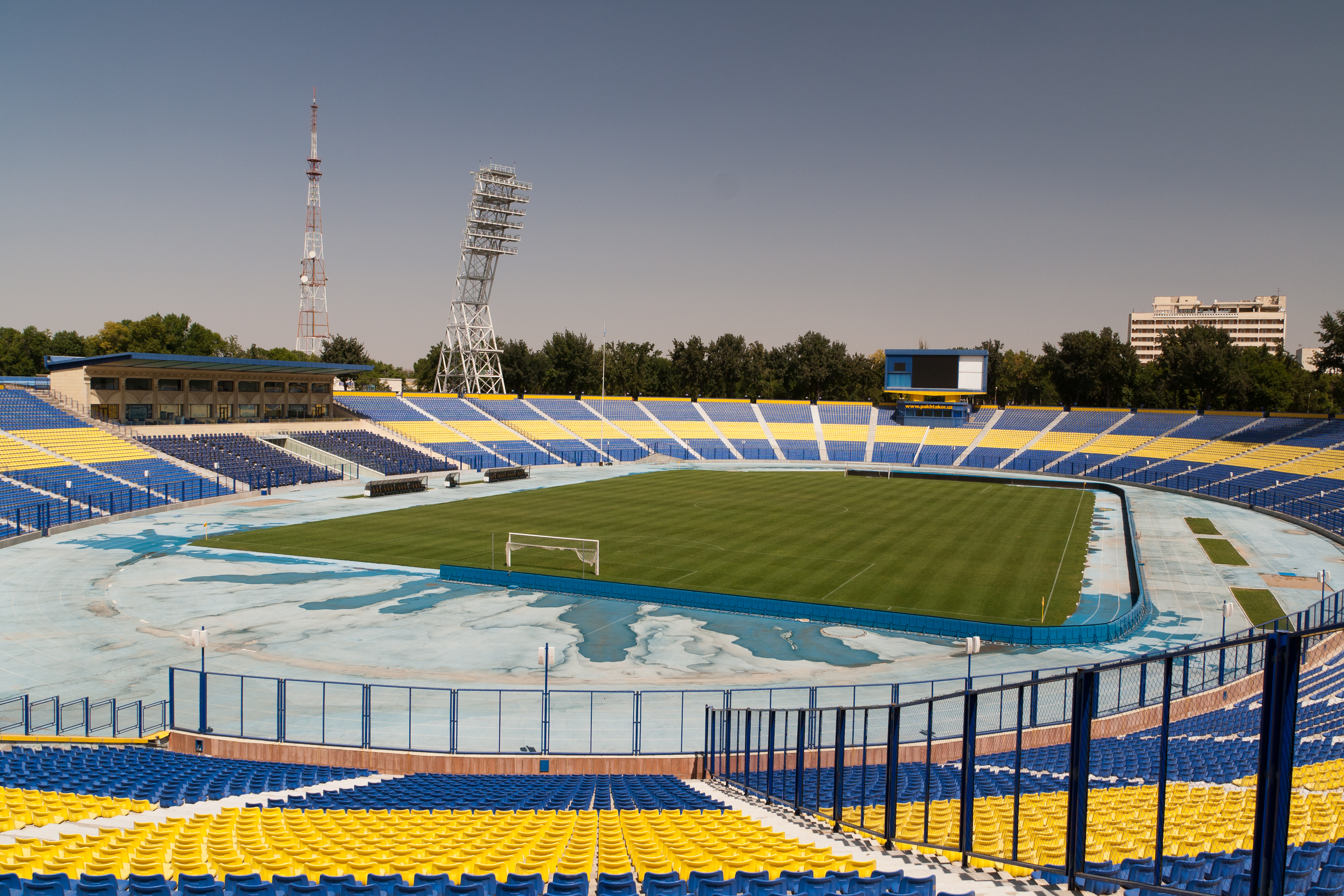
- Event: 2010 Uzbekistan Cup
FC Bunyodkor	FC Shurtan Guzar
1	0
- Date: 18 August 2010
- Venue: Pakhtakor Markaziy Stadium, Tashkent
- Referee: Ravshan Irmatov

The 2010 Uzbekistan Cup final was the final match of the 2010 Uzbekistan Cup, the 18th season of the Uzbek Cup, a football competition for the 36 teams in the Uzbek League and Uzbek League Division One. The match was contested by FC Bunyodkor and FC Shurtan Guzar at Pakhtakor Markaziy Stadium in Tashkent on August 18, 2010.

== Road to the final ==
FC Bunyodkor		Round	FC Shurtan Guzar
Opponent	Result	2010 Uzbekistan Cup	Opponent	Result
FK Buxoro	2–0	Round of 32	Shahrikhon	3–0
Nasaf Qarshi	2–1, 1–1	Round of 16	Qizilqum Zarafshon	0–2, 4–1
FK Andijan	4–1, 3–1	Quarterfinals	FC Pakhtakor	2–1, 1–1
FK Neftchi	3–2, 4–1	Semifinals	Lokomotiv Tashkent	0–2, 4–0 (aet)

== Match ==
18 August 2010
20:30 UTC+05:00

FC Bunyodkor	1–0	FC Shurtan Guzar
Ristic 62'	Report

Pakhtakor Markaziy Stadium, Tashkent
Attendance: 8,247
Referee: Ravshan Irmatov

Bunyodkor	Shurtan Guzar

FC Bunyodkor:
GK	1	(Uzbekistan) Ignatiy Nesterov(c)
DF	3	(Uzbekistan) Goçguly Goçgulyýew
DF	13	(Uzbekistan) Alexandr Khvostunov
DF	24	(Uzbekistan) Anzur Ismailov
DF	23	(Uzbekistan) Sakhob Juraev
MF	7	(Uzbekistan) Azizbek Haydarov
MF	18	(Uzbekistan) Timur Kapadze
MF	22	(Uzbekistan) Viktor Karpenko
MF	28	(Uzbekistan) Ruslan Melziddinov
FW	9	(North Macedonia) Stevica Ristić	(yellow card) 62'	(substituted off) 90+2'
FW	19	(Montenegro) Bojan Kalević	(yellow card) 65'	(substituted off) 71'
Substitutes:
GK	45	(Uzbekistan) Akbar Turaev
	4	(Uzbekistan) Hikmat Khoshimov		(substituted on) 90+2'
DF	31	(Uzbekistan) Aleksandr Kovalyov
MF	6	(Uzbekistan) Anvar Gafurov
MF	17	(Uzbekistan) Doniyor Khasanov
MF	18	(Uzbekistan) Yannis Mandzukas		(substituted on) 71'
MF	26	(Uzbekistan) Anvar Rakhimov
Manager:
(Uzbekistan) Mirjalol Kasymov

FC Shurtan Guzar:
GK	1	(Georgia (country)) Mikhail Alavidze
DF	2	(Uzbekistan) Yaroslav Krushelnitskiy
DF	17	(Uzbekistan) Vyacheslav Ponomarev
MF	3	(Nigeria) Patrick Agboh
MF	5	(Uzbekistan) Asror Aliqulov
MF	11	(Uzbekistan) Ilnur Khazigaliev	(substituted off) 70'
MF	15	(Uzbekistan) Vadim Afonin
MF	18	(Uzbekistan) Shavkat Raimqulov
MF	19	(Uzbekistan) Aleksandr Merzlyakov
FW	9	(Uzbekistan) Igor Taran	(substituted off) 80'
FW	10	(Uzbekistan) Shakhboz Erkinov	(substituted off) 63'
Substitutions:
GK	30	(Uzbekistan) Aleksandr Korneychuk
DF	4	(Uzbekistan) Jаmоl Оtаqulоv
DF	7	(Uzbekistan) Kоmil Jurаеv
MF	14	(Uzbekistan) Laziz Ubaydullaev
FW	8	(Uzbekistan) Bеkzоd Аbdumuminоv	(substituted on) 80'
FW	16	(Uzbekistan) Viktor Klishin	(substituted on) 63'
FW	29	(Turkmenistan) Döwlеtmurаt Аtaýew	(substituted on) 70'
Manager:
(Germany) Edgar Gess

Assistant referees:
Abdukhamidullo Rasulov
Rafael Ilyosov
Valentin Kovalenko
