= 2014 Uzbekistan First League =

Uzbekistan First League
- Season: 2014
- Champions: Shurtan Guzar
- Relegated: Sherdor-Presstizh; Ghallakor-Avtomobilchi
- Top goalscorer: Viktor Klishin; 40 goals

The 2014 Uzbekistan First League was the 23rd season of 2nd level football in Uzbekistan since independence in 1992. It is split in an Eastern and Western zone, each featuring 12 teams.

== Teams and locations ==
Locations of the 2014 Uzbekistan First League Teams

Team	Location	Stadium	Stadium capacity
Uz-Dong-Ju	Andijan		
Hotira-79	Namangan Province		
Chust-Pakhtakor	Chust		
FK Kosonsoy	Kosonsoy	Kosonsoy Stadium	30,000
Kokand 1912	Kokand	Kokand Stadium	8,000
Obod	Tashkent		
Bunyodkor-2	Tashkent	JAR Stadium	8,460
Lokomotiv BFK	Tashkent		
NBU Osiyo	Tashkent	NBU Stadium	9,100
Oqtepa	Tashkent	Oq-Tepa Stadium	2,000
Pakhtakor-2	Tashkent	Pakhtakor Stadium	33,000
Istiqlol	Pskent	Tukimachi Stadium (Tashkent)	
FK Guliston	Guliston	Guliston Stadium	12,400
Ghallakor-Avtomobilchi	Gallaorol		
FK Zaamin	Jizzakh Province	Zaamin Stadium	4,000
FK Gijduvan	Gijduvan		
Registon	Samarkand		
Sherdor	Samarkand		
Shurtan Guzar	Guzar	G'uzor Stadium	8,000
Spartak Bukhoro	Bukhoro		
Mash'al-2	Muborak	Bahrom Vafoev Stadium	10,000
Alanga	Koson		
FK Orol Nukus	Nukus	Turon Stadium	9,300
Xorazm FK Urganch	Urganch	Xorazm Stadium	12,000

== Competition format ==
League consists of two regional groups: conference "East" and "West". The season comprises two phases. The first phase consists of a regular home-and-away schedule: each team plays the other teams twice. The top eight teams of the first phase from each zone will be merged in one tournament and compete for the championship. The bottom four teams of each zone after first phase will play relegation matches to remain in first league.

The draw of the 2014 season was held on 21 February 2014. First League joined Shurtan Guzar, Guliston, Obod Tashkent, Mash'al-2, FK Gijduvan.

Sherdor-Presstizh changed its name to Sherdor (Samarkand).

== First phase ==
Final standings after finishing first phase of championship

=== Zone "East" ===
Pos	Team	Pld	W	D	L	GF	GA	GF	Pts	Qualification or relegation
1	Kokand 1912	22	15	4	3	50	24	+26	49	Promotion to the 2nd phase of championship
2	Oqtepa	22	14	3	5	41	28	+13	45	.
3	Obod	22	13	3	6	37	27	+10	42	.
4	NBU Osiyo	22	12	3	7	44	29	+15	39	.
5	Uz-Dong-Ju	22	11	0	11	34	37	-3	33	.
6	Hotira-79	22	9	3	10	27	32	-5	30	.
7	Istiqlol	22	9	2	11	49	52	-3	29	.
8	Pakhtakor-2	22	7	5	10	34	40	-6	26	.
9	Lokomotiv BFK	22	6	7	9	30	38	-8	25	.
10	FK Kosonsoy	22	7	1	14	33	44	-11	22	.
11	Bunyodkor-2	22	5	7	10	28	39	-11	22	.
12	Chust-Pakhtakor	22	3	4	15	25	45	-20	13	.

=== Top goalscorers ===
#	Scorer	Team	Goals (Pen.)
1	(Uzbekistan) Abdulatif Abdukodirov	NBU Osiyo	18
2	(Uzbekistan) Otabek Khaydarov	Kokand 1912	17
3	(Uzbekistan) Isroil Tursunov	Istiqlol	12

=== Zone "West" ===
Pos	Team	Pld	W	D	L	GF	GA	GF	Pts	Qualification or relegation
1	Shurtan Guzar	22	20	2	0	77	9	+68	62	Promotion to the 2nd phase of championship
2	FK Zaamin	22	14	3	5	30	14	+16	45	.
3	Xorazm FK Urganch	22	13	4	5	34	21	+14	43	.
4	FK Orol Nukus	22	11	3	8	27	22	+5	36	.
5	Mash'al-2	22	10	3	9	23	30	-7	33	.
6	Alanga Koson	22	9	3	10	34	41	-8	30	.
7	Sherdor	22	8	6	8	19	28	-9	30	.
8	Ghallakor-Avtomobilchi	22	7	4	11	30	39	-9	25	.
9	FK Guliston	22	7	3	12	22	32	-10	24	.
10	Spartak Bukhoro	22	6	2	14	25	37	-12	20	.
11	FK Gijduvan	22	4	3	15	21	47	-26	15	.
12	Registon	22	2	2	18	10	32	-22	8	.

=== Top goalscorers ===
#	Scorer	Team	Goals (Pen.)
1	(Uzbekistan) Viktor Klishin	Shurtan Guzar	28
2	(Uzbekistan) Alexander Vostrikov	Shurtan Guzar	12
3	(Uzbekistan) Soli Khayrullaev	Ghallakor-Avtomobilchi	11

== Second phase ==
=== Championship round ===
==== Table before start ====
League table before start of second phase of championship.

Pos	Team	Pld	W	D	L	GF	GA	GF	Pts	Qualification or relegation
1	Shurtan Guzar	14	13	1	0	51	5	+46	40	Promotion to Uzbek League
2	Kokand 1912	14	9	2	3	29	17	+12	29	.
3	FK Zaamin	14	8	2	4	22	12	+10	26	.
4	Obod	14	8	1	5	22	19	+3	25	.
5	Oqtepa	14	7	3	4	27	23	+4	24	.
6	Xorazm FK Urganch	14	6	4	4	20	16	+4	22	.
7	Mash'al-2	14	6	2	6	11	19	-8	20	.
8	NBU Osiyo	14	6	1	7	24	20	+4	19	.
9	Uz-Dong-Ju	14	6	0	8	21	24	-3	18	.
10	FK Orol Nukus	14	5	3	6	12	15	-3	18	.
11	Pakhtakor-2	14	5	2	6	25	28	-3	17	.
12	Hotira-79	14	5	1	8	16	24	-8	16	.
13	Alanga Koson	14	4	3	7	15	26	-11	15	.
14	Istiqlol	14	4	0	10	29	38	-9	12	.
15	Sherdor	14	3	3	8	6	22	-16	12	.
16	Ghallakor-Avtomobilchi	14	1	2	11	10	32	-22	5	.

==== Final standings ====
The last matchday matches were played on 29 October 2014.

Pos	Team	Pld	W	D	L	GF	GA	GF	Pts	Qualification or relegation
1	Shurtan Guzar	30	25	2	3	88	18	+70	77	Promotion to Uzbek League
2	Kokand 1912	30	23	2	5	75	28	+47	71	.
3	Obod	30	20	3	7	61	33	+28	63	.
4	Oqtepa	30	19	4	7	70	41	+29	61	.
5	Uz-Dong-Ju	30	17	1	12	51	41	+10	52	.
6	NBU Osiyo	30	14	5	11	59	46	+13	47	.
7	Mash'al-2	30	13	5	12	33	42	-9	44	.
8	FK Zaamin	30	11	6	13	39	44	-5	39	.
9	Pakhtakor-2	30	11	6	13	50	57	-7	39	.
10	FK Orol Nukus	30	10	4	16	33	38	-5	34	.
11	Alanga Koson	30	9	5	16	39	56	-17	32	.
12	Xorazm FK Urganch	30	8	8	14	37	51	-14	32	.
13	Istiqlol	30	10	1	19	54	71	-17	31	.
14	Hotira-79	30	8	6	16	42	60	-18	30	.
15	Sherdor	30	8	5	17	23	63	-40	29	Qualification to the relegation play-offs
16	Ghallakor-Avtomobilchi	30	1	3	26	35	100	-65	6	.

Last updated: 29 October 2014
Source: Soccerway

=== Top goalscorers ===
#	Scorer	Team	Goals (Pen.)
1	(Uzbekistan) Viktor Klishin	Shurtan Guzar	40
2	(Uzbekistan) Otabek Khaydarov	Kokand 1912	25
3	(Uzbekistan) Shakhboz Jumaboev	Uz-Dong-Ju	20

=== Relegation round ===
The teams ranked 9-12th place in first phase of championship played against each other in one leg group competition to define teams which play in relegation play-offs. The relegation round matches took place from 20-26 October 2014.

==== Final standings ====
Pos	Team	Pld	W	D	L	GF	GA	GF	Pts	Qualification or relegation
1	Chust-Pakhtakor	4	3	1	0	6	3	+3	10	Remain in First League
2	FK Kosonsoy	4	1	3	0	7	4	+3	6	.
3	Bunyodkor-2	4	1	2	1	7	7	0	5	.
4	Lokomotiv BFK	4	1	1	2	6	9	-3	4	Qualification to the relegation play-offs
5	FK Gijduvan	4	0	1	3	4	7	-3	1	.

=== Relegation play-offs ===
The one leg relegation matches of 15th and 16th placed teams of championship round (Ghallakor-Avtomobilchi, Sherdor-Presstizh) against two last placed teams of relegation round (Bunyodkor-2, Lokomotiv BFK) were played on 4 November 2014. Bunyodkor-2 and Lokomotiv BFK remained in First League for 2015 season.

==== Matches ====
Team 1	Score	Team 2
Ghallakor-Avtomobilchi	1-4	Bunyodkor-2
Sherdor-Presstizh	0-1	Lokomotiv BFK
