= Hayrulla Karimov =

Uzbekistani footballer

Personal information
- Date of birth: 22 April 1978 (age 48)
- Place of birth: Namangan, Uzbek SSR, Soviet Union
- Height: 1.83 m (6 ft 0 in)
- Position: Defender

Senior career*
Years	Team	Apps	(Gls)
1996–2004	Navbahor Namangan	93	(11)
2005–2007	Mash'al Mubarek	23	(1)
2008–2016	Bunyodkor	144	(3)
2010	→ Nasaf Qarshi (loan)	12	(0)
2016	→ Navbahor Namangan (loan)	10	(0)

International career^{‡}
2007–2009	Uzbekistan	15	(0)
- * Club domestic league appearances and goals as of 18 September 2017 ‡ National team caps and goals as of 13 August 2009

Hayrulla Karimov (born 22 April 1978 in Namangan region, Uzbekistan) is a former Uzbek international footballer.

== Career ==
=== Club ===
Karimov started his career in Navbahor Namangan. In 1996, he won Uzbek League with club. He played for Navbahor from 1996 to 2004. In 2005, he joined Mash'al Mubarek and finished runner-up in League. Karimov moved to Bunyodkor in 2008. He is currently one of the leading players of Bunyodkor and captain of the team. On 7 March 2014 Bunyodkor won 2013 UzPFL Supercup and became the only player who won this Cup twice. In 1999, he won first UzPFL Supercup with Navbahor Namangan.

=== International ===
Karimov has made 16 appearances for the Uzbekistan national football team.

== Career statistics ==
=== Club ===
As of match played 3 August 2016

Appearances and goals by club, season and competition
Club	Season	League			National Cup		League Cup		Continental		Other		Total	
Club	Season	Division	Apps	Goals	Apps	Goals	Apps	Goals	Apps	Goals	Apps	Goals	Apps	Goals
Bunyodkor	2008	Uzbek League	17	0			-		4	0	-		21	0
Bunyodkor	2009	Uzbek League	16	3	3	0	-		5	0	-		24	3
Bunyodkor	2010	Uzbek League	4	0	7	0	-		2	0	-		13	0
Bunyodkor	2011	Uzbek League	20	0	1	0	-		6	1	-		27	1
Bunyodkor	2012	Uzbek League	23	0	8	0	-		11	1	-		42	1
Bunyodkor	2013	Uzbek League	24	0	4	0	-		7	0	-		35	0
Bunyodkor	2014	Uzbek League	18	0	5	0	-		7	0	1	0	31	0
Bunyodkor	2015	Uzbek League	21	0	3	0	-		2	0	-		26	0
Bunyodkor	2016	Uzbek League	1	0	0	0	-		0	0	-		1	0
Bunyodkor	Total		144	3	31	0	-	-	44	2	1	0	220	5
Nasaf Qarshi (loan)	2010	Uzbek League	12	0	0	0	–		–		–		12	0
Navbahor Namangan (loan)	2010	Uzbek League	10	0	2	0	–		–		–		12	0
Career total			166	3	33	0	-	-	44	2	1	0	244	5

=== International ===
Tajikistan national team
Year	Apps	Goals
2007	9	0
2008	4	0
2009	2	0
Total	15	0

Statistics accurate as of match played 1 April 2017

== Honours ==
=== Club ===
Navbahor

- Uzbek League: 1996
- Uzbek Cup: 1998
- Uzbekistan Supercup: 1999

Mash'al

- Uzbek League runner-up: 2005
- Uzbek Cup runner-up: 2006

Bunyodkor

- Uzbek League (4): 2008, 2009, 2011, 2013
- Uzbek Cup (3): 2008, 2012, 2013
- Uzbekistan Supercup: 2013
- AFC Champions League Semifinal (2): 2008, 2012
