= Yaroslav Krushelnitskiy =

Uzbekistani footballer

Personal information
- Date of birth: 16 March 1983 (age 43)
- Place of birth: G'uzor, Uzbek SSR, Soviet Union
- Height: 1.86 m (6 ft 1 in)
- Position: Defender

Senior career*
Years	Team	Apps	(Gls)
2002–2003	Pakhtakor Tashkent	31	(2)
2004	Rotor Volgograd	1	(0)
2005–2006	Navbahor Namangan	44	(4)
2007	Andijan	20	(2)
2008	Nasaf Qarshi	28	(0)
2009	Qizilqum Zarafshon	16	(2)
2010–2011	Shurtan Guzar	39	(4)
2012	Mes Sarcheshmeh	2	(0)
2012–2013	Shurtan Guzar	33	(0)
2014	Felda United F.C.	10	(0)
2015	Andijan	0	(0)
2015–2016	Oqtepa		

International career
2010	Uzbekistan	4	(0)

Managerial career
- 2019: Oqtepa
- * Club domestic league appearances and goals

Yaroslav Krushelnitskiy (Russian: Ярослав Крушельницкий; born 16 March 1983) is an Uzbekistani football coach and a former Uzbekistani international defender.

== Career ==
=== FC Shurtan Guzar ===
He joined FC Shurtan Guzar in 2010 and prolonged his contract with club for another one year.

After the end of 2011 season he moved to Mes Sarcheshmeh of Iran Pro League. In February 2012 he joined FC Shurtan Guzar back.

=== International ===
He made his international debut with Uzbekistan in a 0–1 loss against Albania on 8 August 2010. Krushelnitskiy was injured in 2010 and could not participate in the 2011 AFC Asian Cup.
