= Bahodir Pardaev =

Uzbek footballer (born 1987)

Personal information
- Full name: Bahodir Pardaev
- Date of birth: 26 April 1987 (age 39)
- Place of birth: Jizzakh, Uzbekistan, Soviet Union
- Height: 1.83 m (6 ft 0 in)
- Position: Forward

Senior career*
Years	Team	Apps	(Gls)
2008–2014	Bunyodkor	36	(8)
2010	→ Navbahor Namangan (loan)	1	(0)
2011	→ Sogdiana Jizzakh (loan)	13	(9)
2013	→ Buxoro (loan)	12	(5)
2014–2015	Pakhtakor Tashkent	36	(11)
2016	Buxoro	29	(7)
2017	Kokand 1912	3	(0)
2017	Bucheon FC 1995	5	(1)
2018	Kokand 1912	10	(0)
2018–2019	Metallurg Bekabad	26	(5)
2020–2021	Bunyodkor	3	(0)
- * Club domestic league appearances and goals as of 27 January 2020

Bahodir Pardaev (born 26 April 1987) is an Uzbek former professional footballer who played as a forward, having previously played for Navbahor Namangan, Sogdiana Jizzakh, Bunyodkor, Buxoro, Pakhtakor Tashkent and Kokand 1912.

== Career ==
At the end of the 2015 season, Pardaev decided to leave Pakhtakor Tashkent.

== Career statistics ==
=== Club ===
As of match played 17 May 2017

Appearances and goals by club, season and competition
Club	Season	League			National Cup		League Cup		Continental		Other		Total	
Club	Season	Division	Apps	Goals	Apps	Goals	Apps	Goals	Apps	Goals	Apps	Goals	Apps	Goals
Bunyodkor	2008	Uzbek League	12	3		3	–		0	0	–		12	6
Bunyodkor	2009	Uzbek League	0	0	1	1	–		2	0	–		3	1
Bunyodkor	2010	Uzbek League	0	0	0	0	–		0	0	–		0	0
Bunyodkor	2011	Uzbek League	0	0	0	0	–		0	0	–		0	0
Bunyodkor	2012	Uzbek League	16	5	5	2	–		4	0	–		25	7
Bunyodkor	2013	Uzbek League	3	0	1	1	–		0	0	–		4	1
Bunyodkor	2014	Uzbek League	5	0	0	0	–		6	0	1	0	12	0
Bunyodkor	2020	Uzbek League	3	0	0	0	–		0	0	0	0	3	0
Total		36	8	7+	7	–	–	12	0	1	0	56+	15	
Navbahor Namangan (loan)	2010	Uzbek League	1	0			–		–		–		1	0
Sogdiana Jizzakh (loan)	2011	Uzbek League	13	9			–		–		–		13	9
Buxoro (loan)	2013	Uzbek League	12	5			–		–		–		12	5
Pakhtakor Tashkent	2014	Uzbek League	13	7	0	0	–		0	0	–		13	7
Pakhtakor Tashkent	2015	Uzbek League	23	4	4	0	–		4	0	0	0	31	4
Pakhtakor Tashkent	Total		36	11	4	0	–	–	4	0	0	0	44	11
Buxoro	2016	Uzbek League	29	7	5	2	–		–		–		34	9
Kokand 1912	2017	Uzbek League	3	0	0	0	–		–		–		3	0
Bucheon FC 1995	2017	K League Challenge	5	1	1	0	–		–		–		6	1
Career total			135	41	17+	9	–	–	16	0	1	0	169	50
