= Igor Taran =

Uzbekistani footballer (born 1983)

Personal information
- Full name: Igor Taran
- Date of birth: 29 December 1983 (age 42)
- Place of birth: G'uzor, Uzbek SSR, Soviet Union
- Height: 1.83 m (6 ft 0 in)
- Position: Striker

Team information
- Current team: Neftchi Fergana

Senior career*
Years	Team	Apps	(Gls)
2003–2006	Shurtan Guzar	48	(22)
2007–2008	FK Andijan	55	(6)
2009–2012	Shurtan Guzar	102	(33)
2013	Bunyodkor	18	(4)
2014	Nasaf Qarshi	16	(3)
2015–2017	Shurtan Guzar	72	(26)
2018	Kokand 1912	6	(0)
2018–	Neftchi Fergana	9	(1)

International career^{‡}
2010–2012	Uzbekistan	4	(0)
- * Club domestic league appearances and goals as of 22 December 2019 ‡ National team caps and goals as of 4 June 2018

Igor Taran (Russian: Игорь Таран) (born 29 December 1983 in G'uzor) is an Uzbekistani footballer who plays as a striker. He currently plays for Neftchi Fergana.

== Club career ==
He started his career at Shurtan Guzar before moving to FK Andijan in 2007 where he played for two seasons. In 2009, he returned to his former club Shurtan Guzar.

On 4 January 2013 Bunyodkor officially announced the signing of Igor Taran. In 2015, he moved back to Shurtan Guzar, after playing one season for Nasaf Qarshi in 2013.

== International career ==
He made his debut for the Uzbekistan national football team on 11 August 2010 in a friendly match against Albania, which ended in a 1–0 win for Albania.

== Honours ==
Bunyodkor

- Uzbek League (1): 2013
- Uzbek Cup (1): 2013
