= Ondřej Cverna =

Czech footballer

Personal information
- Date of birth: 30 July 1990 (age 36)
- Place of birth: Czechoslovakia
- Height: 1.80 m (5 ft 11 in)
- Position: Midfielder

Team information
- Current team: ŠSK Bílovec

Youth career
- 1996–2002: TJ Lokomotiva Suchdol
- 2002–2006: ŠSK Bílovec
- 2006–2011: Baník Ostrava

Senior career*
Years	Team	Apps	(Gls)
2011–2012	Baník Ostrava	16	(0)
2012–2014	Karviná	30	(0)
2014–2015	Slavia Kroměříž		
2015–2019	Vítkovice	58	(0)
2019–	ŠSK Bílovec		
- * Club domestic league appearances and goals as of 18:21, 7 June 2019 (UTC)

Ondřej Cverna (born 30 July 1990) is a professional Czech football player who currently plays for MFK Karviná.

== Career ==
After 15 years, ŠSK Bílovec announced on their Facebook page in March 2019, that Cverna had returned to the club.
