= Viktor Klishin =

Uzbekistani footballer

Viktor Nikolaevich Klishin
Personal information
- Full name: Viktor Nikolaevich Klishin
- Date of birth: 15 October 1982 (age 44)
- Place of birth: Uzbekistan
- Height: 1.85 m (6 ft 1 in)
- Position: Forward

Team information
- Current team: Qizilqum Zarafshon

Senior career*
Years	Team	Apps	(Gls)
2000–2003	Dustlik	30	(0)
2003	FK Rīga	10	(2)
2004	Navbahor Namangan	26	(10)
2005	Lokomotiv Tashkent	25	(10)
2006–2008	Mash'al Mubarek	78	(23)
2009–2010	FK Andijan	34	(8)
2010	Shurtan Guzar	10	(3)
2011	Dinamo Samarqand	16	(1)
2012	Shurtan Guzar	15	(1)
2013	Mash'al Mubarek		(11)
2014–2015	Shurtan Guzar	4?	(40)
2015–	Qizilqum Zarafshon	3	(0)

International career^{‡}
2007	Uzbekistan	2	(0)
- * Club domestic league appearances and goals as of 22 November 2015 ‡ National team caps and goals as of 25 November 2007

Viktor Klishin (born 15 October 1982 ) is an Uzbek footballer who plays as a forward for Qizilqum Zarafshon.

== Career ==
Klishin started playing professionally for Dustlik in 2000. He completed 4 seasons for Dustlik. After this he moved 2003 FK Riga in 2003. He played for several Oliy League clubs such as Navbahor Namangan, Andijan and Dinamo Samarqand. From 2006 to 2008 he played for Mash'al Mubarek. At the end of the 2007 Oliy League season he was top goalscorer of Mash'al with 14 goals. After playing the 2009-2010 season for FK Andijan he moved to Shurtan Guzar to play the second half of the season. On 18 August 2010 he played in the Uzbek Cup final against Bunyodkor, but Shurtan lost 0-1.

In 2013, he joined Mash'al again. With 11 goals he was the 2nd best club goalscorer after Zokhir Kuziboyev and made a significant contribution to his club's promotion to the top division. A year later, in February 2014, he moved back to Shurtan Guzar. During the 2014 season he played for Shurtan Guzar in the First League. On 5 May 2014 he made first appearance of the season in a home match against FK Zaamin which ended in a 5-0 victory. After the 2014 First League Klishin 1st round of games he was the best goal scoring player with 28 goals. At the end of 2014 First League season Klishin became the best League goalscorer with 40 goals, making his contribution to Shurtan Guzars promotion to the 2015 Uzbek League as 2014 First League champions.

He completed 13 matches for Shurtan in the 2015 Uzbek League. In July 2015, halfway through the season, he left Shurtan and moved to Qizilqum Zarafshon.

== International ==
He made his debut for the national team on 8 October 2007 and made his second appearance in a 2010 FIFA World Cup qualifying match against Chinese Taipei in Taipei. Klishin has been capped in 2 matches for the national team.

== Honours ==
=== Club ===
Dustlik

- Uzbek League (1): 2000
- Uzbek Cup (1): 2000

Mash'al

- Uzbek Cup runners-up: 2006
- Uzbekistan First League (1): 2013

Shurtan

- Uzbek Cup runners-up: 2010
- Uzbekistan First League (1): 2014

=== Individual ===
- Uzbekistan First League Topscorer: 2014 (40 goals)
- Mash'al League Topscorer: 2007 (14 goals)
