= Ikboljon Akramov =

Uzbekistani footballer

Personal information
- Full name: Iqboljon Inomjonovich Akramov
- Date of birth: 10 October 1997 (age 29)
- Place of birth: Fergana, Uzbek SSR, Soviet Union
- Height: 1.78 m (5 ft 10 in)
- Position: Midfielder

Senior career*
Years	Team	Apps	(Gls)
2002–2013	Neftchi Fergana	198	(4)
2014	Olmaliq	5	(0)
2015	Andijon	18	(1)

International career^{‡}
2007	Uzbekistan	3	(0)
- * Club domestic league appearances and goals as of 30 June 2017 ‡ National team caps and goals as of 30 June 2017

Ikboljon Akramov (born 10 October 1983 in Fergana, Uzbek SSR, Soviet Union) is an Uzbek footballer who plays as a midfielder for FK Neftchi Farg'ona. He is a member of Uzbekistan national football team.
