= Abduqahhor Hojiakbarov =

Uzbekistani footballer

Personal information
- Full name: Abduqahhor Hojiakbarov
- Date of birth: 18 July 1989 (age 37)
- Place of birth: Uzbekistan
- Height: 1.75 m (5 ft 9 in)
- Position: Defender

Team information
- Current team: AGMK
- Number: 2

Senior career*
Years	Team	Apps	(Gls)
2007–2009	Kuruvchi	3	(0)
2010–2011	Olmaliq	29	(1)
2012–2013	Kuruvchi	2	(0)
2013	Buxoro	12	(0)
2014–	Olmaliq	103	(0)

International career
2012–	Uzbekistan	1	(0)
- * Club domestic league appearances and goals as of 18 February 2019

Abduqahhor Hojiakbarov (born 18 July 1989) is an Uzbekistani international footballer, who plays as a defender for AGMK.

== Career statistics ==
=== International ===
Uzbekistan national team
Year	Apps	Goals
2012	1	0
Total	1	0

As of match played 29 January 2012.
