= Azizbek Haydarov =

Uzbekistani footballer

Personal information
- Full name: Azizbek Haydarov
- Date of birth: 8 July 1985 (age 41)
- Place of birth: Toshkent, Uzbek SSR, Soviet Union
- Height: 1.82 m (6 ft 0 in)
- Position: Defensive midfielder

Senior career*
Years	Team	Apps	(Gls)
2004–2007	Lokomotiv Tashkent	19	(2)
2007–2011	Bunyodkor	143	(8)
2011–2017	Al Shabab	123	(13)
2017–2018	Ajman	19	(0)
2018	Bunyodkor	12	(3)
2019	Lokomotiv Tashkent	7	(0)

International career^{‡}
2007–2018	Uzbekistan	86	(2)
- * Club domestic league appearances and goals as of 3 March 2019 ‡ National team caps and goals as of 21 January 2019

Azizbek Haydarov (Uzbek Cyrillic: Азизбек Ҳайдаров; born 8 July 1985 in Tashkent) is a former Uzbek professional footballer who recently played for PFC Lokomotiv Tashkent as a defensive midfielder.

== International career ==
Haydarov has made 67 appearances for the Uzbekistan national football team since 2007 (as of 31 March 2015), including six qualifying matches for the 2010 FIFA World Cup.

He captained the Uzbekistan Olympic team in 2007. Haydarov scored for Uzbekistan at the 2011 AFC Asian Cup, in their group stage match against Kuwait. The goal is sometimes credited to Maksim Shatskikh, whose free kick Haydarov deflected into the Kuwait net for the opening goal of a 2–1 win.

=== International goals ===
Scores and results list Uzbekistan's goals tally first.

No.	Date	Venue	Opponent	Score	Result	Competition
1	17 November 2015	Grand Hamad Stadium, Doha, Qatar	Yemen	1–0	3–1	2018 FIFA World Cup qualification

== Honours ==
Bunyodkor

- Uzbek League (3): 2008, 2009, 2010
- Uzbek Cup (2): 2008, 2010
- AFC Champions League semifinal: 2008
