= Aleksandr Kovalyov (footballer, born 1986) =

Uzbekistani professional footballer

Personal information
- Full name: Aleksandr Alexandrovich Kovalyov
- Date of birth: 24 September 1986 (age 40)
- Place of birth: Zhambul, Kazakh SSR, Soviet Union
- Height: 1.83 m (6 ft 0 in)
- Position: Defender

Senior career*
Years	Team	Apps	(Gls)
2004	Lokomotiv-2 Tashkent		
2005	Lokomotiv Tashkent	7	(1)
2006	Dinamo Samarqand	14	(2)
2006–2007	Nasaf Qarshi	36	(1)
2008–2009	Metallurg Bekabad	59	(0)
2010	Bunyodkor	7	(0)
2011–2012	Yenisey Krasnoyarsk	24	(0)
2013–2015	Metallurg Bekabad	55	(3)

International career^{‡}
	Uzbekistan U21	10	(2)
- * Club domestic league appearances and goals ‡ National team caps and goals as of 24 February 2011

Aleksandr Alexandrovich Kovalyov (Russian: Александр Александрович Ковалёв) (born 24 September 1986) is a Kazakhstani-born Uzbekistani professional footballer who last played for Metallurg Bekabad. He plays as a defender.

== Career ==
Kovalyev signed a two-year contract with Bunyodkor in February 2010, after spending two seasons with Metalourg Bekabad. Kovalyev has made one appearance for Bunyodkor in the 2010 AFC Champions League group stages.
