= Ruslan Melziddinov =

Uzbekistani professional footballer (born 1985)

Personal information
- Full name: Ruslan Melziddinov
- Date of birth: 26 March 1985 (age 41)
- Place of birth: Kokand, Uzbek SSR
- Height: 1.80 m (5 ft 11 in)
- Position: Midfielder

Team information
- Current team: Andijon

Senior career*
| Years | Team | Apps | (Gls) |
| 2007–2008 | Neftchi Farg'ona | | |
| 2009–2012 | Bunyodkor | 80 | (5) |
| 2013 | Zhetysu | 17 | (0) |
| 2014 | Neftchi Farg'ona | 18 | (2) |
| 2015 | Naft Masjed Soleyman | 10 | (0) |
| 2015–2017 | Bukhara | 43 | (3) |
| 2017 | Kokand 1912 | 5 | (0) |
| 2017 | Shurtan Guzar | 13 | (1) |
| 2018 | Sogdiana Jizzakh | 12 | (1) |
| 2019– | Andijon | 0 | (0) |

International career
| 2008 | Uzbekistan | 3 | (0) |
- * Club domestic league appearances and goals as of 15:49, 12 May 2019 (UTC)

Ruslan Melziddinov (Russian: Руслан Мельзиддинов; born 26 March 1985) is an Uzbekistani professional footballer who currently plays for FC Andijon as a midfielder.

== Career ==
Melziddinov started his career at Neftchi Farg'ona in 2007. In 2009, he joined Bunyodkor and played 4 seasons for the club. After playing one year in Kazakhstan Premier League at Zhetysu in 2013 he moved back to his former club Neftchi Fergana. In 2015, he joined to Iranian club Naft Masjed Soleyman.

== International ==
He has made appearances for the Uzbekistan national football team, including a match in the 2010 FIFA World Cup qualifying round.

== Honours ==
Bunyodkor

- Uzbek League (3): 2009, 2010, 2011
- Uzbek League runner-up (1): 2012
- Uzbek Cup (1): 2012
- AFC Champions League semifinal: 2012
