= 2010 Uzbekistan Cup =

O'zbekiston Kubogi 2010
Tournament details
- Country: Uzbekistan
- Teams: 36

Final positions
- Champions: FC Bunyodkor
- Runners-up: FC Shurtan Guzar

The 2010 Uzbekistan Cup was the 18th season of the annual Uzbek football Cup competition. The competition started on March 20, 2010, and ended on August 18, 2010, with the final held at the Pakhtakor Markaziy Stadium in Tashkent. FC Pakhtakor were the defending champions.

The cup winner were guaranteed a place in the 2011 AFC Champions League.

== Calendar ==
Round	Date	Fixtures	Clubs	Notes
First round	20–27 March 2010	2	36 → 32	
Round of 32	20 March–18 April 2010	16	32 → 16	Clubs participating in Uzbek League and Division One gain entry.
Round of 16	9–10 June 2010	8	16 → 8	
Round of 16	17–18 June 2010	8	16 → 8	
Quarterfinals	22–23 June 2010	4	8 → 4	
Quarterfinals	26–27 June 2010	4	8 → 4	
Semifinals	30 June–3 July 2010	2	4 → 2	
Semifinals	4–27 July 2010	2	4 → 2	
Final	19 August 2010	1	2 → 1	

== First round ==
Team 1	Score	Team 2
Lokomotiv BFK Tashkent	0–0 (4–2 p)	FK Khiva
FK Kosonsoy	1–0	FK Gulistan-2009

== Round of 32 ==
Team 1	Score	Team 2
Dynamo Ghallakor	0–7	Lokomotiv Tashkent
Zarafshan NCZ	0–1	Nasaf Qarshi
Jaykhun Nukus	0–2	Qizilqum Zarafshon
Shaykhantokhur Tashkent	0–4	Navbahor Namangan
NBU Osiyo	0–1	FK Neftchi
FC Spartak Tashkent	1–2	FK Andijan
Mash'al Akademiya	0–3	Mash'al Mubarek
Lokomotiv BFK Tashkent	1–0	Xorazm FK Urganch
Sogdiana Jizzakh	0–1	Metallurg Bekabad
FK Dinamo-Hamkor Termiz	0–4	FC Pakhtakor
Rush-Milk Futbol Shahrixon	0–3	FC Shurtan Guzar
Shurchi Lochin	0–1	Dynamo Samarkand
FC Bunyodkor-2	1–2	Olmaliq FK
FK Buxoro	0–2	FC Bunyodkor
?	w/o	FK Kosonsoy
?	w/o	Nasaf-2 Qarshi

== Round of 16 ==
Team 1	Agg.	Team 2	1st leg	2nd leg
Dynamo Samarkand	5–4	Navbahor Namangan	2–1	3–3
FK Kosonsoy	1–9	FK Andijan	1–5	0–4
Lokomotiv Tashkent	9–1	Nasaf-2 Qarshi	4–1	5–0
Metallurg Bekabad	6–7	FC Pakhtakor	4–3	2–4
FK Neftchi	4–3	Olmaliq FK	4–2	0–1
Qizilqum Zarafshon	3–4	FC Shurtan Guzar	2–0	1–4
Nasaf Qarshi	2–3	FC Bunyodkor	1–2	1–1
Mash'al Mubarek	w/o	Lokomotiv BFK Tashkent		

== Quarterfinals ==
Team 1	Agg.	Team 2	1st leg	2nd leg
FK Neftchi	7–2	Lokomotiv BFK Tashkent	3–0	4–2
FC Pakhtakor	2–3	FC Shurtan Guzar	1–2	1–1
FK Andijan	2–7	FC Bunyodkor	1–4	1–3
Lokomotiv Tashkent	4–3	Dynamo Samarkand	3–1	1–2

== Semifinals ==
Team 1	Agg.	Team 2	1st leg	2nd leg
FK Neftchi	3–7	FC Bunyodkor	2–3	1–4
Lokomotiv Tashkent	2–4	FC Shurtan Guzar	2–0	0–4 (aet)

== Final ==
18 August 2010

FC Bunyodkor	1–0	FC Shurtan Guzar
Stevica Ristić 62'

Pakhtakor Markaziy Stadium, Tashkent
