= Anvar Rajabov =

Uzbekistani footballer

Personal information
- Date of birth: 23 January 1988 (age 38)
- Place of birth: Uzbekistan
- Height: 1.86 m (6 ft 1 in)
- Position: Striker

Team information
- Current team: Navbahor Namangan

Senior career*
Years	Team	Apps	(Gls)
2006–2007	Bukhoro		
2008–2012	Bunyodkor	30	(7)
2012	Buriram United	1	(0)
2013	Pakhtakor	6	(0)
2014	Andijan	13	(2)
2014	Bukhoro	10	(1)
2015	Sogdiana Jizzakh	13	(2)
2015	Bunyodkor	6	(0)
2016–	Navbahor Namangan	6	(1)

International career^{‡}
2009	Uzbekistan U-20	11	(4)
2010	Uzbekistan U-21	14	(6)
2011–	Uzbekistan	4	(0)
- * Club domestic league appearances and goals as of 4 May 2016 ‡ National team caps and goals as of 7 July 2011

Anvar Rajabov (Uzbek: Анвар Ражабов), born 23 January 1988, is an Uzbekistani football striker. Her currently plays for Navbahor Namangan in the Uzbek League.

== Career ==
In 2006-2007 he played for Bukhoro. After that he joined Bunyodkor. Rajabov played for Bunyodkor in the 2008 AFC Champions League group stage.

== International ==
He made his official debut for national team on 1 June 2011 in a friendly against Ukraine. He also played for Uzbekistan U-20 in 2009.

== Honours ==
=== Club ===
Bunyodkor

- Uzbek League (4): 2008, 2009, 2010, 2011
- Uzbek Cup (2): 2008, 2010
- AFC Champions League semi-final (1): 2008
