= Sakhob Juraev =

Uzbekistani footballer

Personal information
- Full name: Sakhob Juraev
- Date of birth: 19 January 1987 (age 39)
- Place of birth: Djizak, Uzbek SSR, Soviet Union
- Height: 1.74 m (5 ft 8 1/2 in)
- Positions: Left back; midfielder

Team information
- Current team: Olmaliq FK
- Number: 8

Youth career
- MHSK Tashkent

Senior career*
Years	Team	Apps	(Gls)
2005–2007	Lokomotiv Tashkent	40	(0)
2007–2011	Bunyodkor	79	(2)
2011	Sogdiana Jizzakh	9	(0)
2012–2014	Bunyodkor	41	(0)
2014	Lokomotiv Tashkent	4	(0)
2015–	Olmaliq	19	(0)

International career^{‡}
2009–	Uzbekistan	22	(0)
- * Club domestic league appearances and goals as of 8 March 2016 ‡ National team caps and goals as of 8 March 2016

Sakhob Juraev (Uzbek: Саҳоб Жўраев: born 19 January 1987), is an Uzbekistani professional football player who currently plays for Olmaliq FK in the Uzbek League. He usually plays as a left-back.

== Career ==
Juraev began his career at Lokomotiv Tashkent where he played in 2005–2007. He played in 2008–2014 for Bunyodkor. In 2014, he moved back to Lokomotiv Tashkent and played four matches in League. In February 2015 he signed a contract with Olmaliq FK.

== International career ==
He made his debut on 11 February 2009 in the match against Bahrain, which Uzbekistan lost 0–1. Since that Juraev has appeared in 23 matches for Uzbekistan. He was also the member of the team in Asian Cup 2011, where Uzbekistan gained 4th place.

== Honours ==
=== Club ===
Bunyodkor

- Uzbek League (5): 2008, 2009, 2010, 2011, 2013
- Uzbek Cup (4): 2008, 2010, 2012, 2013

Lokomotiv

- Uzbek League runners-up (1): 2014

=== International ===
- AFC Asian Cup 4th: 2011
