= Anvar Gafurov =

Uzbekistani professional footballer

Personal information
- Full name: Anvar Gafurov
- Date of birth: 14 May 1982 (age 44)
- Place of birth: Samarqand, Soviet Union
- Height: 1.85 m (6 ft 1 in)
- Position: Defender

Team information
- Current team: Bunyodkor
- Number: 6

Senior career*
Years	Team	Apps	(Gls)
2000–2001	Sogdiana Jizzakh	64	(1)
2002	Pakhtakor Tashkent	15	(0)
2003–2004	Navbahor Namangan	37	(1)
2005	Dinamo Samarqand	24	(4)
2006–2008	Mash'al Mubarek	78	(10)
2009–2016	Bunyodkor	155	(5)
2016–2017	Obod	29	(1)
2017–2020	Bunyodkor	66	(2)

International career^{‡}
2007–2010	Uzbekistan	19	(1)

Managerial career
- 2021-2022: Bunyodkor (assistant)
- * Club domestic league appearances and goals as of 26 July 2017 ‡ National team caps and goals as of 26 July 2017

Anvar Gafurov (uz: Анвар Ғофуров; born 14 May 1982) is an Uzbekistani professional footballer who currently plays for FC Bunyodkor as a defender.

== Career ==
Anvar Gafurov plays for FC Bunyodkor since 2009 after move from Mash'al Mubarek.

On 26 July 2017, Gafurov re-signed for FC Bunyodkor.
