= FC Bunyodkor-2 =

Bunyodkor-2
- Full name: Bunyodkor-2 Toshkent
- Nickname: The Swallows
- Founded: 2009
- Ground: Chirchiq Stadium, Chirchiq
- Capacity: 6,000
- Head coach: Vadim Shodimatov
- League: Uzbekistan First League
- 2013: 12th (first phase)
Home colours	Away colours

FC Bunyodkor-2 (Uzbek Cyrillic: Бунёдкор-2) is an Uzbek football club based in Tashkent, Uzbekistan. Bunyodkor-2 is the farm club of FC Bunyodkor. Currently the club plays in the First League.

== History ==
Bunyodkor-2 was formed in 2009. The club used to be made up of players from the youth teams and football academy of Bunyodkor. Bunyodkor-2 is feeder team of Bunyodkor. The club plays in the First League and participates in Uzbek Cup. In March 2014 after Sergey Lushan left the club Vadim Shodimatov was appointed as the new head.

== Managers ==
- (Uzbekistan) Dmitriy Kim (2011–2013)
- (Russia) Sergey Lushan (2013–2014)
- (Uzbekistan) Vadim Shodimatov (2014–)
