= JAR Stadium =

Football stadium in Tashkent, Uzbekistan

- Uzbek: JAR stadioni
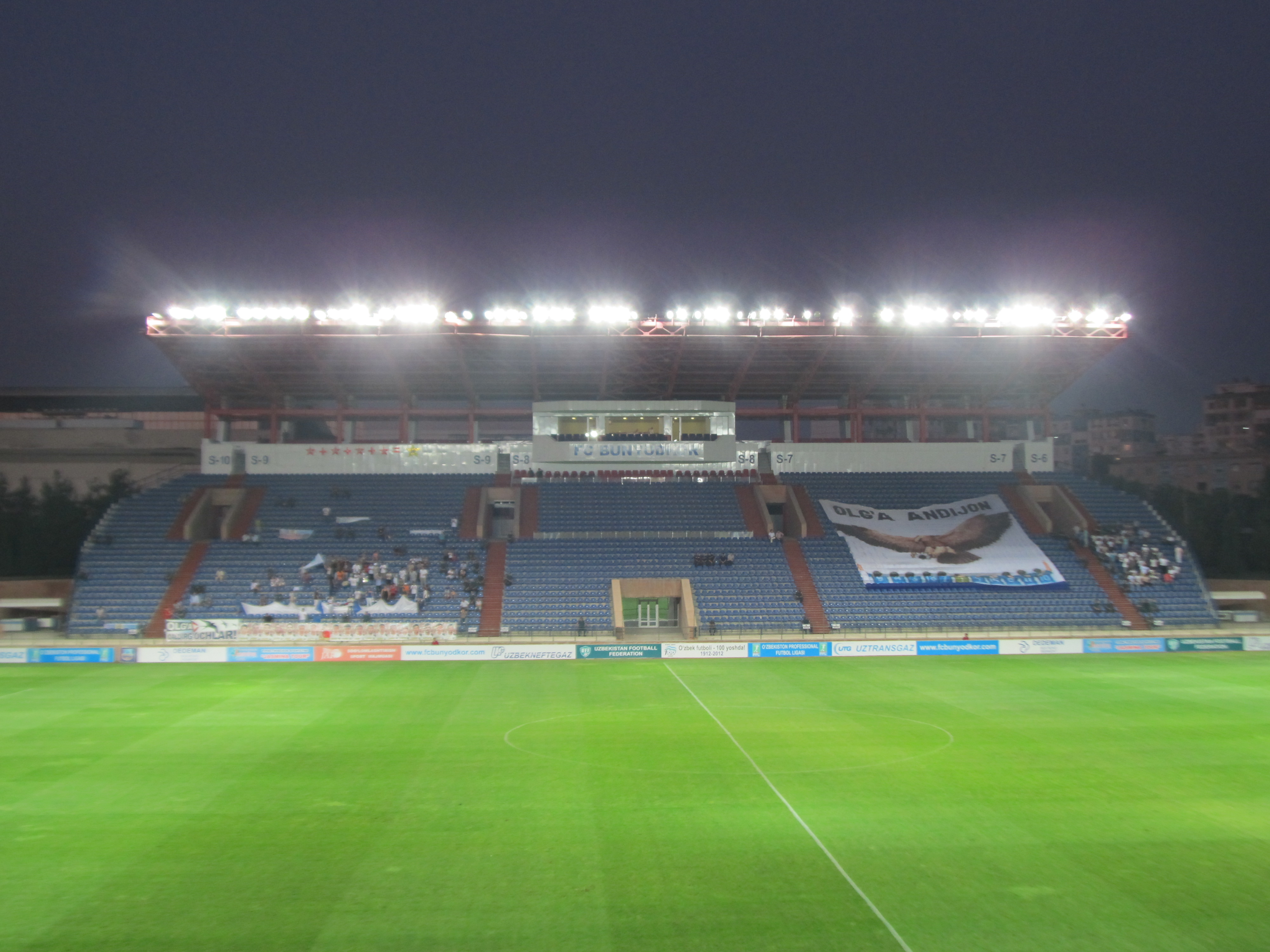
- UZB
- Interactive map of JAR Stadium
- Full name: JAR Sport Complex Stadium
- Location: Shaykhantahur District, Tashkent, Uzbekistan
- Coordinates: 41°19′16.2″N 69°13′47.6″E
- Owner: JAR Sport Complex
- Operator: JAR Sport Complex
- Capacity: 8,500
- Surface: Grass
- Record attendance: More 8,500 (many matches)
- Field size: 112 m × 72 m (122 yd × 79 yd)
- Public transit: Chorsu Metro station JAR Bus station

Construction
- Built: 1997–1998
- Opened: 6 June 1998; 28 years ago
- Renovated: 2005

Tenants
- FC Bunyodkor (2008-2013); FC Pakhtakor (2012); Uzbekistan national football team (2012 and 2014); FC Obod (2016); Uzbekistan U-16, U-17, U-20, U-23 and Women team (1998-present)

JAR Stadium is a football stadium, located in the capital of Uzbekistan, in Tashkent. It is part of the JAR Sport Complex. The stadium seats 8,500 spectators.

JAR Stadium opened in 1998. It was renovated in 2005. At the end of 2008, when the MHSK Stadium was demolished, the Bunyodkor football club temporarily moved to the Jar Stadium, and even after building its new Bunyodkor Stadium (now Milliy Stadium) in 2013, the club held some home matches at this stadium the end of 2015. In 2012, during the renovation of the Pakhtakor Stadium, at this stadium, Pakhtakor played their home games for the floor of the season. In addition, the national, olympic, youth and women teams of Uzbekistan hold some matches at this stadium. From the season of 2016, the stadium has been rented by the club - Obod. Also at the stadium, the women's national football teams of Uzbekistan, different in age, hold their own matches. The JAR Stadium is also one of the bases of the national team of Uzbekistan and the main training stadium for preparations for matches and camps.

In 2009, the famous Portuguese football player Cristiano Ronaldo held a master class at the Jar stadium. Ronaldo conducted master class for young football players at the Bunyodkor’s Jar stadium and showed his tricks to fans, who came to stadium this day.

== Gallery ==
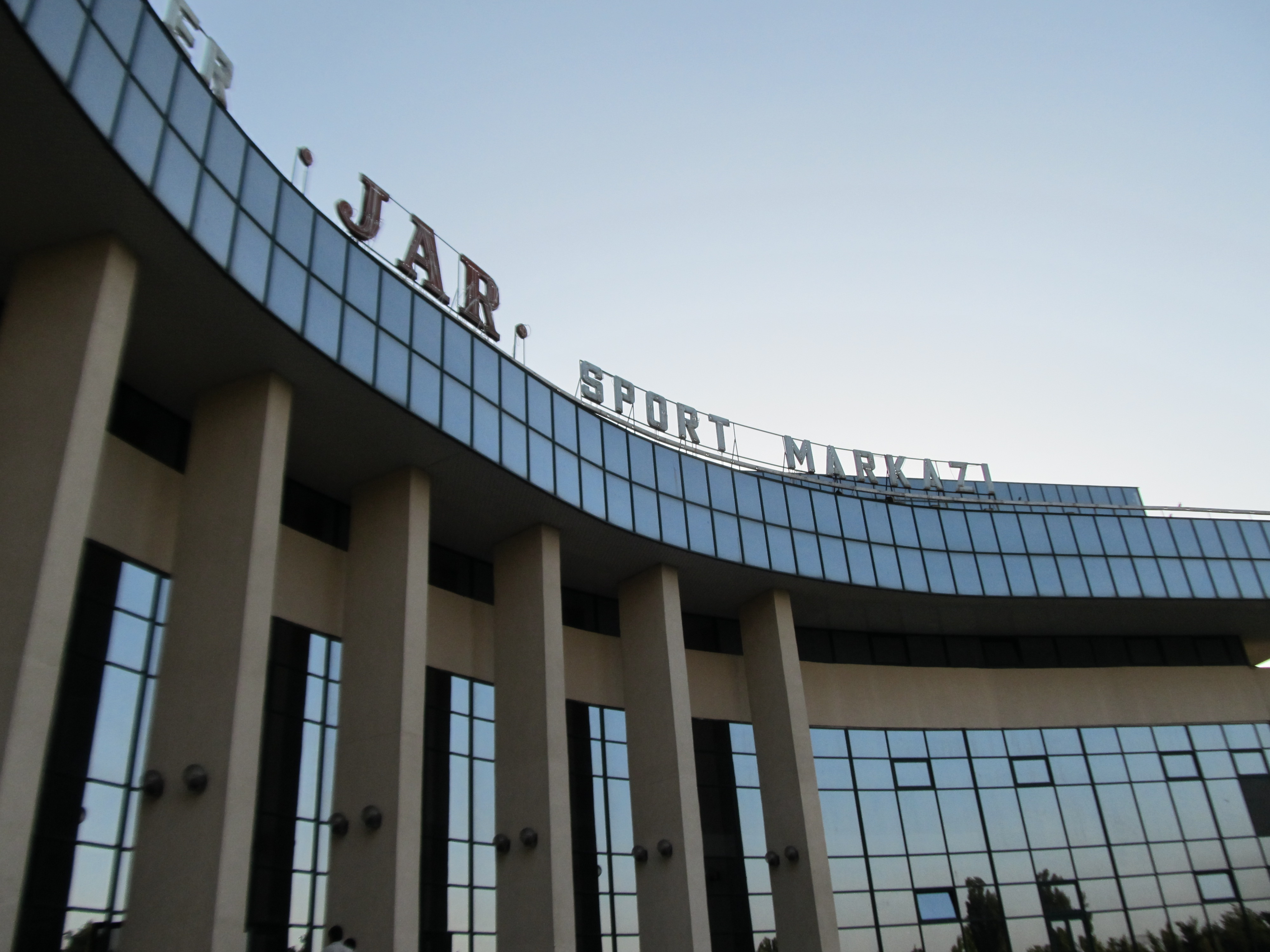

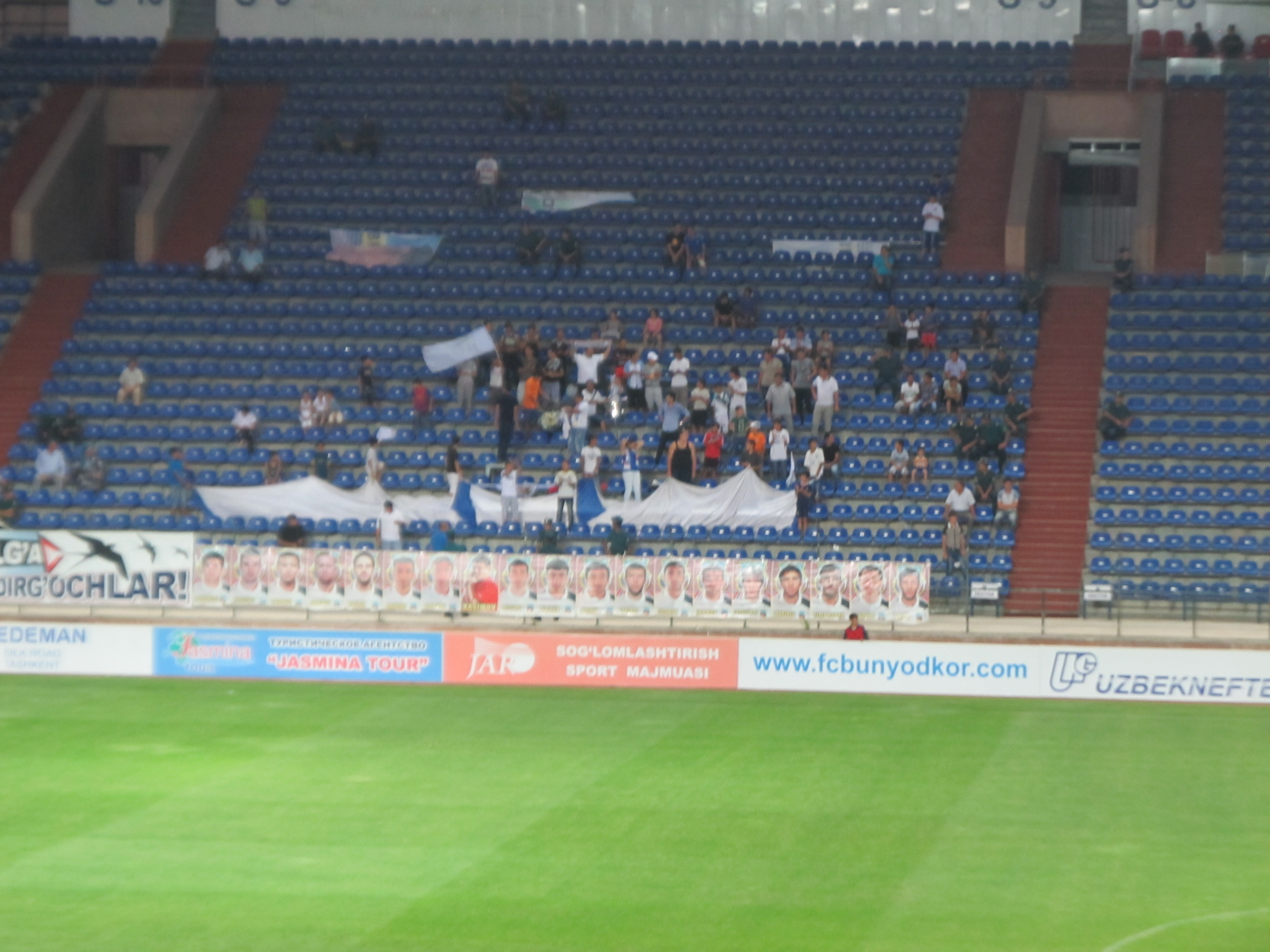

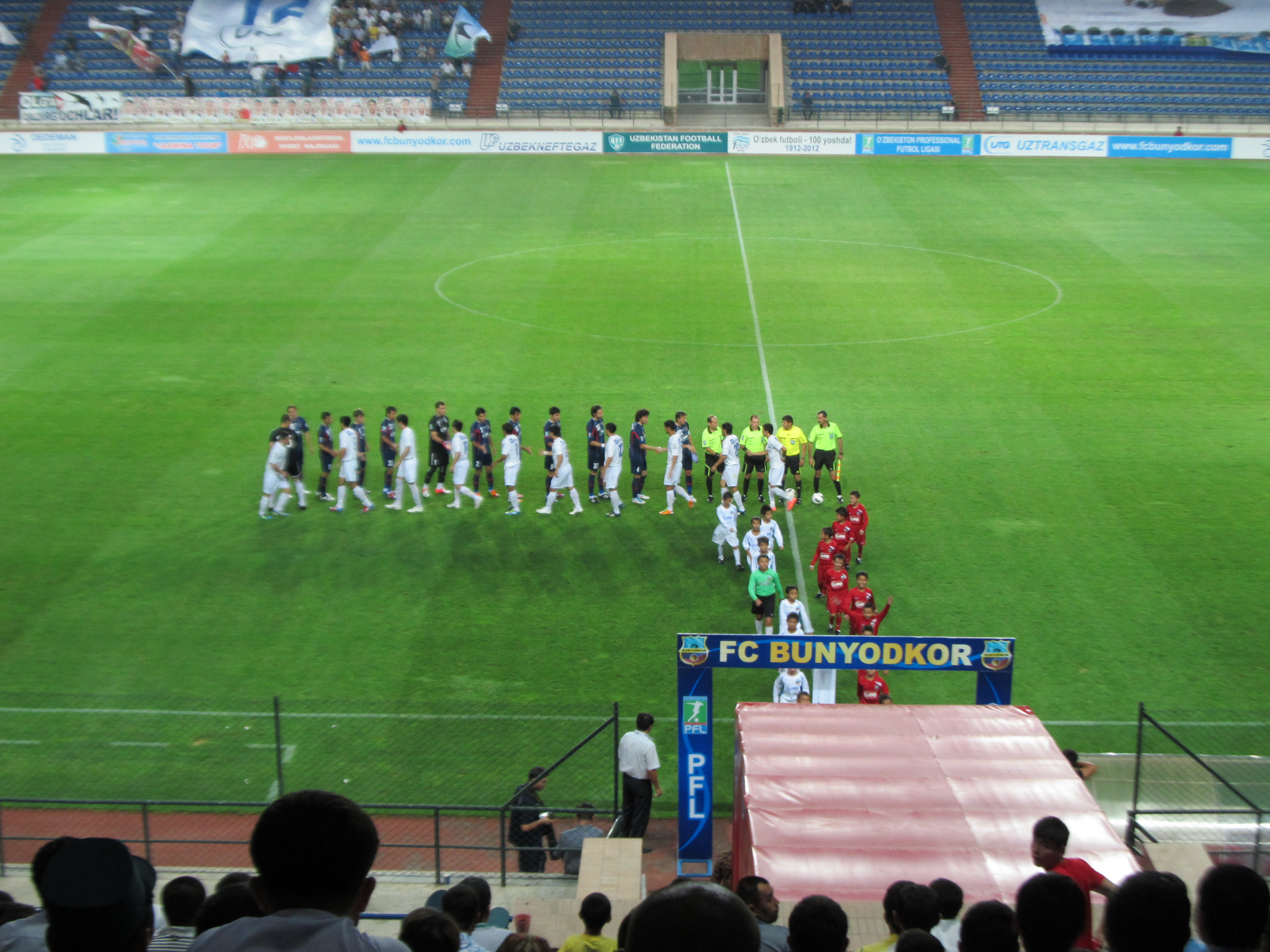

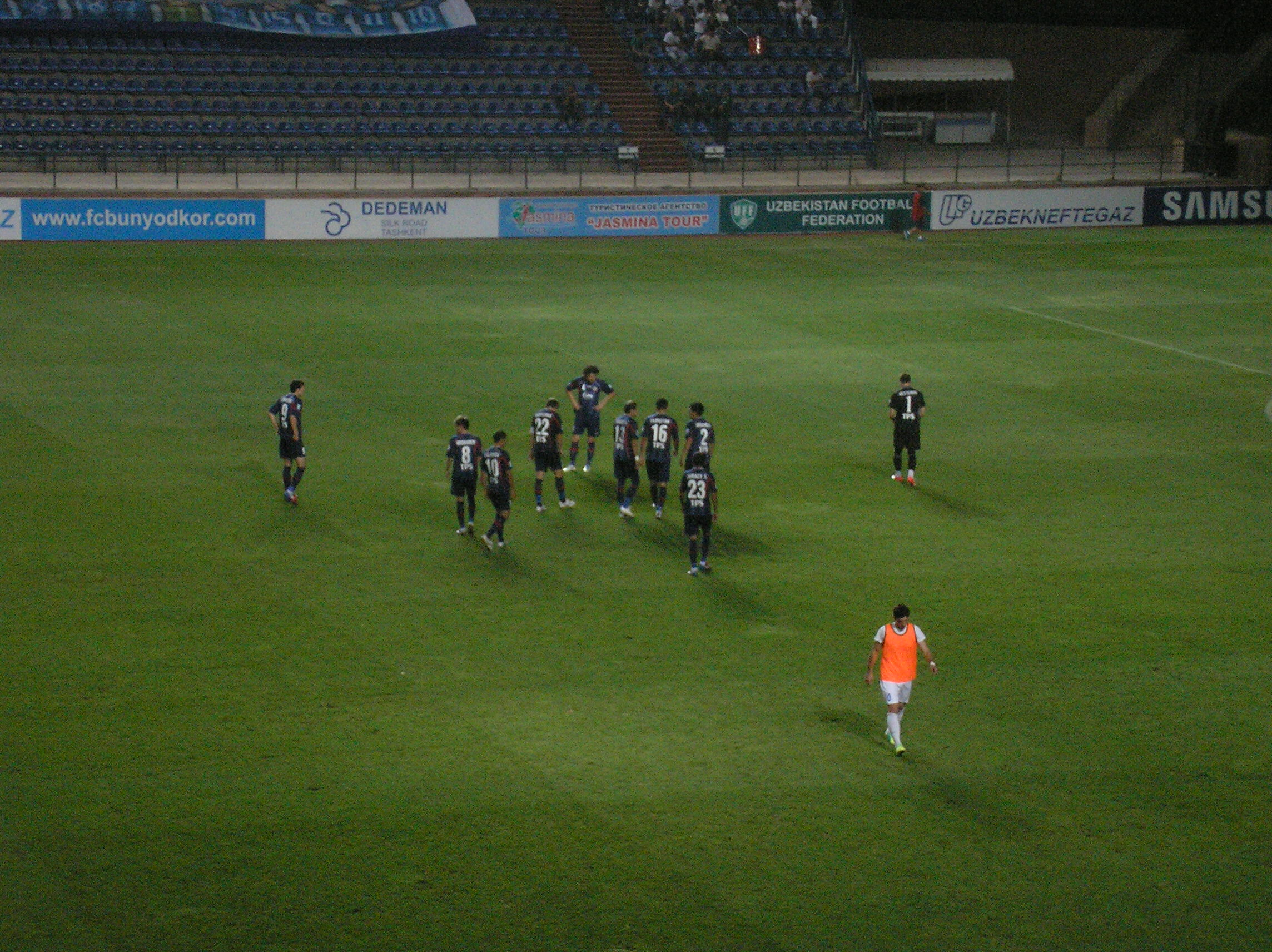
