= FC Shurtan =

Association football club in Uzbekistan

Sho'rtan G'uzor
- Full name: FK Sho'rtan G'uzor Futbol Klubi
- Founded: 1994; 32 years ago
- Ground: G'uzor Stadium
- Capacity: 8,000
- Chairman: Ilkhom Norchayev
- Manager: Ikhtiyor Karimov
- League: Uzbekistan Super League
- 2025: 16th of 16 (Relegated)
Home colours	Away colours

FC Shurtan Guzar (Uzbek: Sho'rtan G'uzor Futbol Klubi or Шўртан Ғузор футбол клуби) is a professional football club based in G‘uzor, Uzbekistan.

== History ==
During its first years, the club played in the lower divisions of Uzbekistan. In 2006 FC Shurtan made its debut in the Uzbek League. The 2010 season was the club's most successful, finishing 4th in the league and as runners-up in the Uzbek Cup. In the quarter-final of the Uzbek Cup, they beat Pakhtakor on aggregate and Lokomotiv Tashkent in the semi-final. Shurtan lost in the final, played in Tashkent, to Bunyodkor. The final score was 0–1.

In 2011 Shurtan made its international debut, playing in the AFC Cup. The club managed 2nd place in the group stage, but lost in their one legged round of 16 match against Al Wehdat 1–2.

On 22 November 2011, Shurtan management appointed Igor Kriushenko as new manager, replacing Tachmurad Agamuradov. Kriushenko was fired on 5 July 2012 and replaced by Edgar Gess. Gess was also fired after poor league results in 2013. The club was 14th and relegated. After one year, they were promoted back to the top division.

== League history ==
Year	Div.	Pos.	Cup	Top scorer
1996	1st	20	FR	
1997	1st	14	FR	Shavkat Ismailov – 29
1998	1st	9	R32	
1999	1st	10		
2000	1st	14	R32	
2001	1st	6	PR	
2002	1st	13	R32	
2003	1st	7	PR	
2004	1st	1	PR	Ravshan Durmonov – 27
2005	UzL	13	R16	Igor Taran – 9
2006	UzL	12	1/4	Igor Taran – 13

Year	Div.	Pos.	Cup	Top scorer (League)
2007	UzL	13	1/4	
2008	UzL	12	1/4	Artur Gevorkyan – 6
2009	UzL	8	1/4	
2010	UzL	4	Finalist	
2011	UzL	7	1/2	Igor Taran – 10
2012	UzL	5	R16	Igor Taran – 14
2013	UzL	14	R16	Pavel Solomin – 7
2014	1st	1	R32	Viktor Klishin – 40
2015	UzL	11th	R16	Igor Taran – 11
2016	UzL	9th	R32	Zafar Polvonov – 12
2017	UzL	14th	R16	
2018	1st	6th		
2019	1st	4th		
2020	1st	4th		
2021	1st	7th		
2022	1st	6th		
2023	1st	5th		
2024	1st	4th		
2025	UzL	14th		
2026				

== Personnel ==
=== Current Players ===
As of 10 March 2025 Note: Flags indicate national team as defined under FIFA eligibility rules; some limited exceptions apply. Players may hold more than one non-FIFA nationality.

No.	Pos.	Nation	Player
1	GK	UZB	Shoxrux Eshbotayev
3	DF	UZB	Shohjahon Sultonmurodov
4	DF	UZB	Ulugbek Xudoyberdiyev
5	DF	UZB	Mirkomil Abdurazzoqov
6	MF	UZB	Sirojiddin Qoziyev
7	MF	UZB	Bekzod Suvonov
8	MF	UZB	Shahboz Nuriddinov
9	MF	UZB	Shahzodjon Neʼmatjonov
10	MF	UZB	Temur Mamasidiqov
11	FW	TJK	Daler Sharipov
13	GK	UZB	Sarvar Mirzayev
14	DF	UZB	Abror Toshqoziyev
15	DF	UZB	Jorabek Mannonov
17	MF	UZB	Javohir Hasanov

No.	Pos.	Nation	Player
18	MF	UZB	Ogabek Asadov
19	MF	UZB	Nuriddin Hasanov
21	FW	UZB	Murodxoja Jabborov
22	DF	UZB	Sardor Sadullayev
24	MF	UZB	Doniyor Narzullayev
27	MF	UZB	Choriyor Tursunqulov
33	MF	UZB	Bekjon Rahmatov
35	GK	UZB	Sherzodbek Abduraimov
47	MF	UZB	Asilbek Anvarov
55	DF	UZB	Azizbek Pirmuhamedov
70	DF	UZB	Mirjalol Jumayev
77	MF	UZB	Asadbek Saidxonov
88	MF	UZB	Abbos Ergashboyev
99	DF	UZB	Komron Saydazimov

=== Current technical staff ===
Position	Name
Manager	(Uzbekistan) Ikhtiyor Karimov
Assistant manager	(Uzbekistan) Jamshid Umarov, Botir Rasulov
Goalkeeping coach	(Uzbekistan) Erkin Mirzaev

== Managerial history ==
Period	Manager
2005	(Ukraine) Sergei Dotsenko
2008	(Uzbekistan) Bakhrom Khakimov
July 1, 2008 – Dec 30, 2008	(Ukraine) Viktor Pasulko
2009	(Uzbekistan) Usmon Toshev
2009–2011	(Germany) Edgar Gess
2011	(Turkmenistan) Tachmurad Agamuradov
Nov 24, 2011 – July 5, 2012	(Belarus) Igor Kriushenko
July 5, 2012 – May 15, 2013	(Germany) Edgar Gess
May 15 – October 18, 2013	(Uzbekistan) Zoir Turakulov
October 18, 2013 – January 6, 2014	(Uzbekistan) Erkin Mirzayev
January 6, 2014 – January 5, 2016	(Uzbekistan) Mukhtor Kurbonov
January 5, 2016 –	(Uzbekistan) Ikhtiyor Karimov

== Honours ==
=== Domestic ===
- Uzbek League 4th place:
  - 2010
- Uzbekistan First League (2):
  - 2004, 2014
- Uzbek Cup runners-up (1):
  - 2010
- UzPFL Cup (1):
  - 2015

== Performance in AFC competitions ==
- AFC Cup: 1 appearance

2011: Round of 16
