= 2022 FC Bunyodkor season =

FC Bunyodkor
2022 season
- Chairman: Bedil Alimov
- Manager: Shukhrat Maqsudov; Victor Karpenko; Ivan Bošković
- Uzbek League: 8th
- Uzbekistan Cup: Round of 16 vs Lokomotiv Tashkent
- Top goalscorer: Umarali Rakhmonaliev (7)
Home colours	Away colours

The 2022 season was Bunyodkor's 16th season in the Uzbekistan Super League; they finished the season in eighth position and reached the Round of 16 of the Uzbekistan Cup.

== Squad ==
As of match played 12 November 2022

No.	Name	Nationality	Position	Date of birth (age)	Signed from	Signed in	Contract ends	Apps.	Goals
Goalkeepers
32	Sukhrob Sultonov	(Uzbekistan)	GK	26 March 1990 (aged 32)	AGMK	2022		23	0
71	Sarvar Karimov	(Uzbekistan)	GK	25 December 1996 (aged 25)	Kokand 1912	2020		22	0
91	Zafar Safaev	(Uzbekistan)	GK	24 June 1991 (aged 31)	Buxoro	2021		10	0
Defenders
3	Makhmud Makhamadzhonov	(Uzbekistan)	DF	30 June 2003 (aged 19)	Academy	2022		12	0
4	Davron Ergashev	(Tajikistan)	DF	19 March 1988 (aged 34)	Khujand	2020		63	2
5	Jasur Yakubov	(Uzbekistan)	DF	26 March 1999 (aged 23)	Pakhtakor Tashkent	2022		13	0
6	Avazbek Ulmasaliev	(Uzbekistan)	DF	27 March 2000 (aged 22)	Lokomotiv Tashkent	2021		50	3
17	Farkhod Mirakhmatov	(Uzbekistan)	DF	5 August 1994 (aged 28)	Navbahor Namangan	2022		20	0
30	Ollobergan Karimov	(Uzbekistan)	DF	17 June 2006 (aged 16)	Academy	2022		3	0
37	Mukhammadodil Kakhramonov	(Uzbekistan)	DF	10 March 1996 (aged 26)	Metallurg Bekabad	2019		33	1
38	Tokhirbek Tukhtasinov	(Uzbekistan)	DF	8 June 2004 (aged 18)	Academy	2022		1	0
88	Jakhongir Urozov	(Uzbekistan)	DF	18 January 2004 (aged 18)	Academy	2022		16	0
104	Azizbek Tulkinbekov	(Uzbekistan)	DF	10 February 2007 (aged 15)	Academy	2022		1	0
Midfielders
7	Akbar Ismatullaev	(Uzbekistan)	MF	10 January 1991 (aged 31)	Unattached	2022		3	0
8	Francis Narh	(Ghana)	MF	18 April 1994 (aged 28)	Slavia Mozyr	2022		28	3
9	Farrukh Ikramov	(Uzbekistan)	MF	9 July 1998 (aged 24)	Youth Team	2017		73	13
10	Rasul Yuldoshev	(Uzbekistan)	MF	26 October 2000 (aged 22)	Youth Team	2020		59	2
11	Dimitrije Pobulić	(Serbia)	MF	10 May 1994 (aged 28)	Ararat Yerevan	2022		10	2
18	Pavel Mogilevets	(Russia)	MF	25 January 1993 (aged 29)	Unattached	2022		8	0
19	Bilol Tupliyev	(Uzbekistan)	MF	28 August 2003 (aged 19)	Academy	2022		14	0
21	Gayrat Azizkhuzhaev	(Uzbekistan)	MF	26 September 2000 (aged 22)	Academy	2022		8	0
22	Usmonali Ismonaliev	(Uzbekistan)	MF	9 February 1998 (aged 24)	Andijon	2022		27	8
25	Mukhammad Safo Fozilov	(Uzbekistan)	MF	28 November 2002 (aged 19)	Academy	2022		9	0
29	Muzaffar Olimzhonov	(Uzbekistan)	MF	24 July 2001 (aged 21)	Academy	2021		24	0
33	Umarali Rakhmonaliev	(Uzbekistan)	MF	18 August 2003 (aged 19)	Academy	2021		31	9
34	Sukhrob Izzatov	(Uzbekistan)	MF	15 February 1999 (aged 23)	Academy	2017		85	4
36	Diyorbek Jaloliddinov	(Uzbekistan)	MF	12 October 2001 (aged 21)	Kokand 1912	2022		2	0
62	Abdulloh Omonaliev	(Uzbekistan)	MF	10 January 2005 (aged 17)	Spartak Tashkent	2021		7	0
99	Umid Sultonov	(Uzbekistan)	MF	16 May 2003 (aged 19)	Youth Team	2021		23	1
Forwards
14	Khusayn Ergashboev	(Uzbekistan)	FW	21 August 2000 (aged 22)	on loan from Navbahor Namangan	2022	2022	10	0
15	Jasur Khakimov	(Uzbekistan)	FW	24 May 1994 (aged 28)	Unattached	2022		15	6
23	Andrey Gulyamov	(Uzbekistan)	FW	6 August 2002 (aged 20)	Academy	2022		1	0
40	Sudaysi Juraboev	(Uzbekistan)	FW	16 May 2002 (aged 20)	Academy	2021		1	0
44	Ibrahim Tomiwa	(Nigeria)	FW	10 May 1998 (aged 24)	Oqtepa	2022		49	15
45	Farkhod Utkirov	(Uzbekistan)	FW	30 November 1999 (aged 22)	Academy	2022		3	0
Players away on loan
Players who left during the season
2	Sardorbek Khursandov	(Uzbekistan)	DF	29 March 2000 (aged 22)	Academy	2021		4	0
5	Dilshod Juraev	(Uzbekistan)	DF	21 April 1992 (aged 30)	AGMK	2022			
7	Odilzhon Abdurakhmanov	(Kyrgyzstan)	MF	18 March 1996 (age 30)	Alay Osh	2021		36	1

== Transfers ==
=== Winter ===
In: Note: Flags indicate national team as defined under FIFA eligibility rules; some limited exceptions apply. Players may hold more than one non-FIFA nationality.

No.	Pos.	Nation	Player
5	DF	UZB	Dilshod Juraev (from (Uzbekistan) AGMK)
8	MF	GHA	Francis Narh (from (Belarus) Slavia Mozyr)
11	MF	SRB	Dimitrije Pobulić (from (Armenia) Ararat Yerevan)
14	FW	UZB	Khusayn Ergashboev (on loan from (Uzbekistan) Navbahor Namangan)
17	DF	UZB	Farkhod Mirakhmatov (from (Uzbekistan) Navbahor Namangan)
22	DF	UZB	Usmonali Ismonaliev (from (Uzbekistan) Andijon)
32	GK	UZB	Sukhrob Sultonov (from (Uzbekistan) AGMK)
44	FW	NGR	Ibrahim Tomiwa (from (Uzbekistan) Oqtepa, previously on loan)

Out: Note: Flags indicate national team as defined under FIFA eligibility rules; some limited exceptions apply. Players may hold more than one non-FIFA nationality.

No.	Pos.	Nation	Player
1	GK	UZB	Ravshanbek Yagudin (loan return to (Uzbekistan) Oqtepa)
3	DF	UZB	Dian Talkhatov (to (Uzbekistan) Sogdiana Jizzakh)
8	MF	UZB	Sanjar Rashidov
10	MF	UZB	Khursid Giyosov (to (Uzbekistan) AGMK)
13	MF	UZB	Lutfulla Turaev (to (Uzbekistan) Neftchi Fergana)
14	FW	UZB	Mirjakhon Mirakhmadov (to (Uzbekistan) Pakhtakor Tashkent)
19	MF	UZB	Nurillo Tukhtasinov (to (Uzbekistan) Navbahor Namangan)
22	FW	UZB	Shakhboz Erkinov (to (Uzbekistan) Andijon)
24	DF	UZB	Bek Abdullayev
26	DF	UZB	Ulugbek Abdullayev (to (Uzbekistan) Surkhon Termez)
30	MF	UZB	Abdulla Abdullayev (to (Uzbekistan) AGMK)
35	DF	UZB	Azizbek Pirmuhamedov (to (Uzbekistan) Xorazm Urganch)
48	MF	UZB	Valeriy Akopov

=== Summer ===
In: Note: Flags indicate national team as defined under FIFA eligibility rules; some limited exceptions apply. Players may hold more than one non-FIFA nationality.

No.	Pos.	Nation	Player
5	DF	UZB	Jasur Yakubov (from (Uzbekistan) Pakhtakor Tashkent)
7	MF	UZB	Akbar Ismatullaev (Unattached)
15	FW	UZB	Jasur Khakimov (Unattached)
18	MF	RUS	Pavel Mogilevets (Unattached)
36	MF	UZB	Diyorbek Jaloliddinov (from (Uzbekistan) Kokand 1912)

Out: Note: Flags indicate national team as defined under FIFA eligibility rules; some limited exceptions apply. Players may hold more than one non-FIFA nationality.

No.	Pos.	Nation	Player
2	DF	UZB	Sardorbek Khursandov (to (Poland) Sportis Łochowo)
5	DF	UZB	Dilshod Juraev (to (Uzbekistan) Qizilqum Zarafshon)
7	MF	KGZ	Odiljon Abdurakhmanov (to (Kazakhstan) Maktaaral)

== Friendlies ==
2022	–
UZT (UTC+5)

== Competitions ==
=== Overview ===
Competition	First match	Last match	Starting round	Final position	Record							
Competition	First match	Last match	Starting round	Final position	Pld	W	D	L	GF	GA	GD	Win %
Super League	3 March 2022	12 November 2022	Matchday 1	8th	26	9	7	10	29	37	−8	34.62
Uzbekistan Cup	9 April 2022	21 August 2022	Group stage	Round of 16	4	2	2	0	11	4	+7	50.00
Total					30	11	9	10	40	41	−1	36.67

Last updated: 12 November 2022
Source: Competitions

=== Uzbek League ===
==== League table ====
Pos	Team	Pld	W	D	L	GF	GA	GD	Pts
6	Olympic	26	7	14	5	31	28	+3	35
7	Sogdiana	26	9	7	10	31	31	0	34
8	Bunyodkor	26	9	7	10	29	37	−8	34
9	Neftchi	26	8	8	10	31	32	−1	32
10	Metallurg	26	8	8	10	19	27	−8	32

Updated to match(es) played on 12 November 2022. Source: Uzbekistan Professional Football League
Rules for classification: 1) points; 2) head-to-head points; 3) head-to-head goal difference; 4) head-to-head away goals scored; 5) goal difference; 6) number of goals scored.

==== Results summary ====
Overall								Home						Away					
Pld	W	D	L	GF	GA	GD	Pts	W	D	L	GF	GA	GD	W	D	L	GF	GA	GD
26	9	7	10	29	37	−8	34	4	3	6	14	22	−8	5	4	4	15	15	0

Last updated: 12 November 2022.
Source: See Results

==== Results by round ====
Round	1	2	3	4	5	6	7	8	9	10	11	12	13	14	15	16	17	18	19	20	21	22	23	24	25	26
Ground	H	A	H	H	A	H	A	H	A	H	A	H	A	A	H	A	A	H	A	H	A	H	A	H	A	H
Result	D	L	W	W	W	L	L	D	D	L	L	D	W	L	L	D	W	L	D	W	W	L	D	W	W	L
Position																										

Source: See Results
A = Away; H = Home; W = Win; D = Draw; L = Loss

==== Results ====
3 March 2022 1	Bunyodkor	0 – 0	Sogdiana Jizzakh	Tashkent
18:30 UZT (UTC+5)	Ulmasaliev (yellow card) 31'; Makhamadzhonov (yellow card) 33'	Report		Stadium: Lokomotiv Stadium; Attendance: 1,001; Referee: Shavkat Nasibullayev

10 March 2022 2	Qizilqum Zarafshon	3 – 1	Bunyodkor	Olmaliq
18:30 UZT (UTC+5)	Joʻrayev 45+1'; Abdukholiqov 47'; Boydullayev (yellow card) 53'; Tukhtakhujaev (yellow card) 71'; Stanisavljević 75'	Report	Makhamadzhonov (yellow card) 35'; Urozov (yellow card) 45+2'; Tupliyev (yellow card) 79'; Juraev 90+2' (pen.)	Stadium: AGMK Stadium; Attendance: 652; Referee: Ilgiz Tantashev

18 March 2022 3	Bunyodkor	2 – 1	Lokomotiv Tashkent	Tashkent
18:30 UZT (UTC+5)	Juraev (yellow card) 58'; Tomiwa 64' (pen.), 79'	Report	Makharadze (yellow card) 81'; Ulmasaliev 90+2' (o.g.)	Stadium: Milliy Stadium; Attendance: 1,155; Referee: Axrol Risqullaev

31 March 2022 4	Bunyodkor	2 – 1	Dinamo Samarqand	Tashkent
19:00:30 UZT (UTC+5)	Urozov (yellow card) 16'; Juraev (yellow card) 36'; Tomiwa (yellow card) 36'; Rakhmonaliev 84' (pen.) (yellow card) 88'; Ismonaliev 90+3'	Report	Nurmatov (yellow card) 13'; Rashidov 16'; Isroilov (red card) 64'; Muzaffarov (yellow card) 65'; Ismailov (yellow card) 65'; Jovanović (yellow card) 82'; Mannonov (yellow card) 90+5'	Stadium: Milliy Stadium; Attendance: 1,910; Referee: Rustam Lutfullin

25 April 2022 5	Neftchi Fergana	1 – 3	Bunyodkor	Yaypan
18:20 UZT (UTC+5)	Ješić (yellow card) 50' (goal) 51'; Gofurov (yellow card) 62'; Gafurov (red card) 90'; Olimov (yellow card) 90+1'	Report	Narh (yellow card) 15' (goal) 56'; Abdurakhmanov (yellow card) 34'; Ulmasaliev (yellow card) 46'; Rakhmonaliev 63'; Ismonaliev 70' (yellow card) 72'	Stadium: Uzbekistan Stadium; Attendance: 1,077; Referee: Akobirxuja Shukurullaev

30 April 2022 6	Bunyodkor	1 – 5	Olympic Tashkent	Tashkent
18:30 UZT (UTC+5)	Tomiwa 40'; Ergashev (yellow card) 44'; Ismonaliev (yellow card) 79'; U.Sultonov (yellow card) 90'	Report	Boriyev 9'; Mirsaidov (yellow card) 26'; Jiyanov 29'; Odilov 37'; Anvarov 9'; Kholdorkhonov 90+1' (yellow card) 90+2'	Stadium: Milliy Stadium; Attendance: 864; Referee: Elyor Tursunov

6 May 2022 7	Navbahor Namangan	2 – 1	Bunyodkor	Namangan
18:30 UZT (UTC+5)	Akhmedov 41' (pen.); Đokić 84'; Yusupov (yellow card) 90+5'	Report	Izzatov (yellow card) 55'; Tomiwa 64'; S.Sultonov (yellow card) 80'	Stadium: Markaziy Stadium; Attendance: 26,231; Referee: Rustam Lutfullin

10 May 2022 8	Bunyodkor	1 – 1	Metallurg Bekabad	Tashkent
19:00 UZT (UTC+5)	Izzatov (yellow card) 15'; Rakhmonaliev 18'; Ulmasaliev (yellow card) 90'	Report	Norbekov (red card) 49'; Temirov (yellow card) 55' (goal) 67'; Otakhonov (yellow card) 83'; Kholturaev (yellow card) 90'	Stadium: Milliy Stadium; Attendance: 2,400; Referee: Firdavs Norsafarov

16 May 2022 9	AGMK	0 – 0	Bunyodkor	Olmaliq
19:00 UZT (UTC+5)	Akhmadaliev (yellow card) 26'	Report	Kakhramonov (yellow card) 77'; Juraev (yellow card) 81'	Stadium: AGMK Stadium; Attendance: 4,389; Referee: Asker Najafaliyev

24 May 2022 10	Bunyodkor	1 – 4	Nasaf	Tashkent
19:00 UZT (UTC+5)	Tomiwa 23' (yellow card) 45+4'; Mirakhmatov (yellow card) 63'	Report	Eshmurodov (yellow card) 21'; Bozorov 36', 57'; Mukhiddinov 41'; Norchaev 69'	Stadium: Milliy Stadium; Attendance: 11,000; Referee: Shavkat Nasibullayev

29 May 2022 11	Surkhon Termez	1 – 0	Bunyodkor	Olmaliq
19:00 UZT (UTC+5)	Dzhuraboyev 27'	Report		Stadium: AGMK Stadium; Attendance: 255; Referee: Firdavs Norsafarov

21 June 2022 12	Bunyodkor	1 – 1	Kokand 1912	Tashkent
20:00 UZT (UTC+5)	Ergashev (yellow card) 76' (goal) 90+5'	Report	Azimov (yellow card) 27'; Josović 90+1'	Stadium: Milliy Stadium; Attendance: 1,565; Referee: Rahimbek Karimov

29 June 2022 13	Pakhtakor Tashkent	2 – 3	Bunyodkor	Tashkent
20:00 UZT (UTC+5)	Fayzullaev 18'; Erkinov (yellow card) 67'; Sayfiev 86'	Report	Khakimov 51'; Rakhmonaliev 81', 90+4' (penalty missed) 90+4'; Tomiwa (yellow card) 90+5'	Stadium: Pakhtakor Central Stadium; Attendance: 1,852; Referee: Ilgiz Tantashev

1 August 2022 14	Sogdiana Jizzakh	2 – 0	Bunyodkor	Jizzakh
20:00 UZT (UTC+5)	Kakhramonov 17'; Čermelj (yellow card) 43'; Kolaković (yellow card) 67'; Ulmasaliev 73' (o.g.)	Report	Ergashev (red card) 52'	Stadium: Sogdiana Stadium; Attendance: 4,572; Referee: Rahimbek Karimov

10 August 2022 15	Bunyodkor	1 – 2	Qizilqum Zarafshon	Tashkent
20:00 UZT (UTC+5)	Fozilov (yellow card) 23'; Khakimov 79'	Report	Abdukholiqov 10', 54'; Dmitrijev (yellow card) 64'	Stadium: Lokomotiv Stadium; Attendance: 248; Referee: Temur Toxtasinov

16 August 2022 16	Lokomotiv Tashkent	0 – 0	Bunyodkor	Tashkent
20:00 UZT (UTC+5)	Jaloliddinov (penalty missed) 23' (yellow card) 45'; Jumaboyev (yellow card) 67'	Report	Ulmasaliev (yellow card) 24' (yellow-red card) 45+4'; Yakubov (yellow card) 90+2'	Stadium: Lokomotiv Stadium; Attendance: 1,056; Referee: Asker Najafaliyev

28 August 2022 17	Dinamo Samarqand	1 – 2	Bunyodkor	Samarkand
19:00 UZT (UTC+5)	Shohruh 25'; Baydullaev (yellow card) 85'	Report	Ismonaliev 57'; Pobulic 62'; Rakhmonaliev (penalty missed) 65'; Ergashev (yellow card) 88'; Izzatov (yellow card) 89'	Stadium: Dinamo Samarkand Stadium; Attendance: 3,210; Referee: Firdavs Norsafarov

8 September 2022 18	Bunyodkor	1 – 2	Neftchi Fergana	Olmaliq
18:30 UZT (UTC+5)	Pobulic 11' (pen.) (yellow card) 46'; Ismonaliev (yellow card) 85'	Report	Larin (yellow card) 9'; Ubaydullaev (penalty missed) 45+2'; Musaev 45+3' (yellow card) 85'; Gofurov 51'; Abdullaev (yellow card) 78'	Stadium: AGMK Stadium; Attendance: 428; Referee: Aziz Asimov

15 September 2022 19	Olympic Tashkent	1 – 1	Bunyodkor	Tashkent
19:30 UZT (UTC+5)	Mirsaidov (yellow card) 22'; Buriev (yellow card) 28'; Khamraliev 90'; Toirov (yellow card) 90+6'	Report	Izzatov (yellow card) 35' (yellow-red card) 48'; Narh 45+3' (pen.); Yakubov (yellow card) 87'; Ergashev (yellow card) 90+7'	Stadium: JAR Stadium; Attendance: 1,540; Referee: Temur Toxtasinov

1 October 2022 20	Bunyodkor	2 – 1	Navbahor Namangan	Tashkent
18:30 UZT (UTC+5)	Ismonaliev 7'; Makhamadzhonov (yellow card) 73'; Khakimov 90' (pen.)	Report	Yakhshiboev 42'	Stadium: JAR Stadium; Attendance: 5,827; Referee: Ilgiz Tantashev

7 October 2022 21	Metallurg Bekabad	1 – 2	Bunyodkor	Bekabad
18:30 UZT (UTC+5)	Toshkuziev 35'	Report	Khakimov 41' (yellow card) 58'; U.Sultonov 77'	Stadium: Metallurg Bekabad Stadium; Attendance: 4,511; Referee: Gayrat Jorayev

19 October 2022 22	Bunyodkor	0 – 1	AGMK	Tashkent
18:30 UZT (UTC+5)	Ulmasaliev (yellow card) 76'	Report	Papava 7'	Stadium: JAR Stadium; Attendance: 1,033; Referee: Shavkat Nasibullayev

25 October 2022 23	Nasaf	1 – 1	Bunyodkor	Qarshi
18:30 UZT (UTC+5)	Norchaev 47'; Aliqulov (yellow card) 52'; Stanojević (penalty missed) 90+11'	Report	Urozov (yellow card) 6'; Khakimov 23'; Makhamadzhonov (yellow card) 30'; Omonaliev (yellow card) 60'; Khakimov (yellow card) 83'; Ergashev (yellow card) 85'; Olimzhonov (red card) 90+8'	Stadium: Markaziy Stadium; Attendance: 3,227; Referee: Temur Toxtasinov

3 November 2022 24	Bunyodkor	2 – 1	Surkhon Termez	Tashkent
20:00 UZT (UTC+5)	Utkirov (yellow card) 3'; Ismonaliev 12'; Pobulic (yellow card) 51'; Ikromov 70' (red card) 70'; S.Sultonov (yellow card) 75'; Yakubov (yellow card) 90+4'	Report	Saidazimov (yellow card) 44'; Sánchez 76'	Stadium: JAR Stadium; Attendance: 2,003; Referee: Akobir Shukurullayev

7 November 2022 25	Kokand 1912	0 – 1	Bunyodkor	Yaypan
16:15 UZT (UTC+5)	Ruziev (yellow card) 83'; Azimov (yellow card) 90'	Report	U.Sultonov (yellow card) 76'; Rakhmonaliev 81'	Stadium: Uzbekistan Stadium; Attendance: 837; Referee: Aziz Asimov

12 November 2022 26	Bunyodkor	0 – 2	Pakhtakor Tashkent	Tashkent
17:00 UZT (UTC+5)	Makhamadzhonov (yellow card) 16'; Ergashev (yellow card) 56'; Ulmasaliev (yellow card) 76'; Yakubov (yellow card) 79'; Omonaliev (red card) 82'	Report	Ćeran 14'; Turgunboev 16'; Sayfiev (yellow card) 75'; Azmiddinov (yellow card) 90+4'	Stadium: JAR Stadium; Attendance: 7,614; Referee: Ahrol Risqullayev

=== Uzbek Cup ===
==== Group stage ====
Pos	Team	Pld	W	D	L	GF	GA	GD	Pts	Qualification
1	Bunyodkor	3	2	1	0	9	2	+7	7	Knockout stage
2	Metallurg	3	1	1	1	4	5	−1	4 (Note: Head to Head criteria)	Knockout stage
3	Surkhon	3	1	1	1	2	1	+1	4	Knockout stage
4	Buxoro	3	0	1	2	1	8	−7	1	

Updated to match(es) played on April 21, 2022. Source: Soccerway
Notes:

9 April 2022 1	Metallurg Bekabad	2 – 4	Bunyodkor	Bekabad
18:00 UZT (UTC+5)	Ibragimov 10'; Isoqjonov (red card) 44'; Temirov 49' (pen.); Otakhonov (yellow card) 75'; Bekmurodov (yellow card) 77'	Report	Ismonaliev 7', 74'; Narh 19'; Juraev 35' (pen.); Abdurakhmanov (yellow card) 36' (yellow-red card) 56'; Ulmasaliev (yellow card) 39'; Khursandov (yellow card) 49'	Stadium: Metallurg Bekabad Stadium; Attendance: 2,120; Referee: Viktor Serazitdinov

15 April 2022 2	Bunyodkor	0 – 0	Surkhon Termez	Tashkent
18:15 UZT (UTC+5)	Narh (yellow card) 74'	Report	Khasanov (yellow card) 35'; Sohibov (yellow card) 56'; Kasymov (yellow card) 61'; Akhmadov (yellow card) 88'; Bobojonov (yellow card) 90+2'	Stadium: Milliy Stadium; Attendance: 567; Referee: Rahimbek Karimov

21 April 2022 3	Bunyodkor	5 – 0	Buxoro	Tashkent
18:25 UZT (UTC+5)	Ismonaliev 21'; Tomiwa 29'; Ergashev 53'; Rakhmonaliev 75' (pen.); Khursandov 82'	Report	Khasanov (yellow card) 77'; Nematov (yellow card) 90+2'	Stadium: Milliy Stadium; Attendance: 411; Referee: Vadim Agishev

==== Knockout Stage ====
21 August 2022 Last 16	Bunyodkor	2 – 2 (4–5 p)	Lokomotiv Tashkent	Olmaliq
19:00 UZT (UTC+5)	Khakimov 4'; Mirakhmatov (yellow card) 80'; Ergashev (yellow card) 83'; Rakhmonaliev (yellow card) 98'; Ismonaliev 113'	Report	Alijonov 2'; Salimov (yellow card) 50'; Jumaboev (yellow card) 53'; Safarov (yellow card) 65'; Kobilov 92' (yellow card) 90+4' (yellow-red card) 108'; Makharadze (yellow card) 105'	Stadium: AGMK Stadium; Attendance: 197; Referee: Rustam Lutfullin
	Penalties
	Rakhmonaliev (penalty scored); Mogilevets (penalty missed); Yakubov (penalty scored); Saarma (penalty scored); Ergashev (penalty scored)		(penalty scored) Makharadze; (penalty scored) Gulomov; (penalty scored) Kodirkulov; (penalty scored) Mukhtorov; (penalty scored) Jaloliddinov

== Squad statistics ==
As of match played 12 November 2022

=== Appearances and goals ===
No.	Pos	Nat	Player	Total		Uzbek Super League		Uzbek Cup	
No.	Pos	Nat	Player	Apps	Goals	Apps	Goals	Apps	Goals
3	DF	(Uzbekistan) UZB	Makhmud Makhamadzhonov	12	0	9+2	0	0+1	0
4	DF	(Tajikistan) TJK	Davronjon Ergashev	27	1	23	1	4	0
5	DF	(Uzbekistan) UZB	Jasur Yakubov	13	0	10+2	0	1	0
6	DF	(Uzbekistan) UZB	Avazbek Ulmasaliev	26	0	21+2	0	3	0
7	MF	(Uzbekistan) UZB	Akbar Ismatullaev	3	0	3	0	0	0
8	MF	(Ghana) GHA	Francis Narh	28	3	22+2	2	4	1
9	MF	(Uzbekistan) UZB	Farrukh Ikramov	1	0	0+1	0	0	0
10	MF	(Uzbekistan) UZB	Rasul Yuldoshev	21	0	13+7	0	1	0
11	MF	(Serbia) SRB	Dimitrije Pobulić	10	2	6+3	2	0+1	0
14	FW	(Uzbekistan) UZB	Khusayn Ergashboev	10	0	0+8	0	0+2	0
15	FW	(Uzbekistan) UZB	Jasur Khakimov	15	6	13+1	5	1	1
17	DF	(Uzbekistan) UZB	Farkhod Mirakhmatov	9	0	7	0	0+2	0
18	MF	(Russia) RUS	Pavel Mogilevets	8	0	6+1	0	0+1	0
19	MF	(Uzbekistan) UZB	Bilol Tupliyev	14	0	0+11	0	0+3	0
21	MF	(Uzbekistan) UZB	Gayrat Azizkhuzhaev	8	0	2+3	0	2+1	0
22	MF	(Uzbekistan) UZB	Usmonali Ismonaliev	27	8	15+8	4	3+1	4
23	FW	(Uzbekistan) UZB	Andrey Gulyamov	1	0	0+1	0	0	0
25	MF	(Uzbekistan) UZB	Mukhammad Safo Fozilov	9	0	7+1	0	1	0
29	MF	(Uzbekistan) UZB	Muzaffar Olimzhonov	19	0	10+5	0	1+3	0
30	DF	(Uzbekistan) UZB	Ollobergan Karimov	3	0	0+3	0	0	0
32	GK	(Uzbekistan) UZB	Sukhrob Sultonov	23	0	21	0	2	0
33	MF	(Uzbekistan) UZB	Umarali Rakhmonaliev	25	8	20+1	7	3+1	1
34	MF	(Uzbekistan) UZB	Suhrob Izzatov	23	0	18+3	0	2	0
36	MF	(Uzbekistan) UZB	Diyorbek Jaloliddinov	2	0	0+2	0	0	0
37	DF	(Uzbekistan) UZB	Mukhammadodil Kakhramonov	11	0	4+4	0	3	0
38	DF	(Uzbekistan) UZB	Tokhirbek Tukhtasinov	1	0	1	0	0	0
40	FW	(Uzbekistan) UZB	Sudaysi Juraboev	1	0	0+1	0	0	0
44	FW	(Nigeria) NGR	Ibrahim Tomiwa	21	6	16+2	5	3	1
45	FW	(Uzbekistan) UZB	Farkhod Utkirov	3	0	2+1	0	0	0
62	MF	(Uzbekistan) UZB	Abdulloh Omonaliev	7	0	0+7	0	0	0
71	GK	(Uzbekistan) UZB	Sarvar Karimov	1	0	0	0	1	0
88	DF	(Uzbekistan) UZB	Jakhongir Urozov	16	0	13+1	0	1+1	0
91	GK	(Uzbekistan) UZB	Zafar Safaev	7	0	5+1	0	1	0
99	MF	(Uzbekistan) UZB	Umid Sultonov	19	1	4+12	1	0+3	0
104	DF	(Uzbekistan) UZB	Azizbek Tulkinbekov	1	0	0+1	0	0	0
Players away on loan:
Players who left Bunyodkor during the season:
2	DF	(Uzbekistan) UZB	Sardorbek Khursandov	4	0	0+1	0	2+1	0
5	DF	(Uzbekistan) UZB	Dilshod Juraev	14	0	11	0	3	0
7	MF	(Kyrgyzstan) KGZ	Odilzhon Abdurakhmanov	11	0	4+5	0	2	0

=== Goal scorers ===
Place	Position	Nation	Number	Name	Uzbek Super League	Uzbekistan Cup	Total
1	MF	(Uzbekistan)	33	Umarali Rakhmonaliev	7	1	8
1	DF	(Uzbekistan)	22	Usmonali Ismonaliev	4	4	8
3	FW	(Uzbekistan)	15	Jasur Khakimov	5	1	6
3	FW	(Nigeria)	44	Ibrahim Tomiwa	5	1	6
5	MF	(Ghana)	8	Francis Narh	2	1	3
6	MF	(Serbia)	11	Dimitrije Pobulic	2	0	2
6	DF	(Tajikistan)	4	Davronjon Ergashev	1	1	2
6	DF	(Uzbekistan)	5	Dilshod Juraev	1	1	2
9	MF	(Uzbekistan)	49	Farrukh Ikromov	1	0	1
9	MF	(Uzbekistan)	99	Umid Sultonov	1	0	1
9	DF	(Uzbekistan)	2	Sardorbek Khursandov	0	1	1
				TOTALS	29	11	0

=== Clean sheets ===
Place	Position	Nation	Number	Name	Uzbek Super League	Uzbekistan Cup	Total
1	GK	(Uzbekistan)	32	Sukhrob Sultonov	3	1	4
2	GK	(Uzbekistan)	91	Zafar Safaev	1	0	1
2	GK	(Uzbekistan)	71	Sarvar Karimov	0	1	1
				TOTALS	4	2	6

=== Disciplinary record ===
Number	Nation	Position	Name	Uzbek Super League		Uzbekistan Cup		Total	
Number	Nation	Position	Name	Yellow card	Red card	Yellow card	Red card	Yellow card	Red card
3	(Uzbekistan)	DF	Makhmud Makhamadzhonov	5	0	0	0	5	0
4	(Tajikistan)	DF	Davronjon Ergashev	6	1	1	0	7	1
5	(Uzbekistan)	DF	Jasur Yakubov	4	0	0	0	4	0
6	(Uzbekistan)	DF	Avazbek Ulmasaliev	7	1	1	0	8	1
8	(Ghana)	MF	Francis Narh	1	0	1	0	2	0
7	(Uzbekistan)	MF	Akbar Ismatullaev	1	0	0	0	1	0
9	(Uzbekistan)	MF	Farrukh Ikramov	0	1	0	0	0	1
11	(Serbia)	MF	Dimitrije Pobulić	2	0	0	0	2	0
15	(Uzbekistan)	FW	Jasur Khakimov	2	0	0	0	2	0
17	(Uzbekistan)	DF	Farkhod Mirakhmatov	2	0	1	0	3	0
19	(Uzbekistan)	MF	Bilol Tupliyev	1	0	0	0	1	0
22	(Uzbekistan)	MF	Usmonali Ismonaliev	3	0	0	0	3	0
25	(Uzbekistan)	MF	Mukhammad Safo Fozilov	2	0	0	0	2	0
29	(Uzbekistan)	MF	Muzaffar Olimzhonov	0	1	0	0	0	1
32	(Uzbekistan)	GK	Sukhrob Sultonov	2	0	0	0	2	0
33	(Uzbekistan)	MF	Umarali Rakhmonaliev	1	0	1	0	2	0
34	(Uzbekistan)	MF	Suhrob Izzatov	5	1	0	0	5	1
37	(Uzbekistan)	DF	Mukhammadodil Kakhramonov	1	0	0	0	1	0
44	(Nigeria)	FW	Ibrahim Tomiwa	4	0	0	0	4	0
45	(Uzbekistan)	FW	Farkhod Utkirov	1	0	0	0	1	0
62	(Uzbekistan)	MF	Abdulloh Omonaliev	1	0	0	0	1	0
88	(Uzbekistan)	DF	Jakhongir Urozov	4	0	0	0	4	0
99	(Uzbekistan)	MF	Umid Sultonov	2	0	0	0	2	0
Players who left Bunyodkor during the season:
2	(Uzbekistan)	DF	Sardorbek Khursandov	0	0	1	0	1	0
5	(Uzbekistan)	DF	Dilshod Juraev	3	0	0	0	3	0
7	(Kyrgyzstan)	MF	Odilzhon Abdurakhmanov	1	0	2	1	3	1
			TOTALS	61	5	8	1	69	6
