= 2021 FC Bunyodkor season =

FC Bunyodkor
2021 season
- Chairman: Bedil Alimov
- Manager: Shukhrat Maqsudov
- Uzbek League: 5th
- Uzbekistan Cup: Semifinal
- Top goalscorer: League: Khursid Giyosov (9); All: Two Players (10)
- Highest home attendance: 5,100 vs Sogdiana Jizzakh (8 April 2021)
- Lowest home attendance: 0 vs Navbahor Namangan (20 August 2021) 0 vs Metallurg Bekabad (13 September 2021) 0 vs Kokand 1912 (10 September 2021)
- Average home league attendance: 1,308 (27 November 2021)
Home colours	Away colours

The 2021 season was Bunyodkor's 15th season in the Uzbekistan Super League; they finished the season in fifth position and reached the semi-final of the Uzbekistan Cup.

== Season events ==
On 19 February, Bunyodkor announced the signings of Sanjar Rashidov and Odiljon Abdurakhmanov whilst extending their contracts with Davron Ergashev, Ulugbek Raimov, Sudaysiy Juraboev and Islam Karimov.

On 20 February, Bunyodkor extended their contract with Shakhboz Erkinov for an additional year, and another two years with Lutfulla Turaev.

On 1 March, Bunyodkor announced the signing of Ibrahim Tomiwa, Dian Talkhatov and Zafar Safaev, whilst Sarvar Karimov and Lubomir Bondarenko had extended their contracts for the 2021 season.

== Squad ==
As of match played 27 November 2021

No.	Name	Nationality	Position	Date of birth (age)	Signed from	Signed in	Contract ends	Apps.	Goals
Goalkeepers
1	Ravshanbek Yagudin	(Uzbekistan)	GK	10 June 1996 (aged 25)	on loan from Oqtepa	2021	2021	18	0
71	Sarvar Karimov	(Uzbekistan)	GK	25 December 1996 (aged 24)	Kokand 1912	2020	2021	21	0
91	Zafar Safaev	(Uzbekistan)	GK	24 June 1991 (aged 30)	Buxoro	2021	2021	3	0
Defenders
3	Dian Talkhatov	(Uzbekistan)	DF	4 January 1997 (aged 24)	Sogdiana Jizzakh	2021	2021	2	0
4	Davron Ergashev	(Tajikistan)	DF	19 March 1988 (aged 33)	Khujand	2020	2021	36	1
6	Avazbek Ulmasaliev	(Uzbekistan)	DF	27 March 2000 (aged 21)	Lokomotiv Tashkent	2021		24	3
7	Farkhod Mirakhmatov	(Uzbekistan)	DF	5 August 1994 (aged 27)	loan from Navbahor Namangan	2021		11	0
24	Bek Abdullayev	(Uzbekistan)	DF	8 November 1999 (aged 22)	Youth Team	2021		1	1
26	Ulugbek Abdullayev	(Uzbekistan)	DF	22 February 1998 (aged 23)	Youth Team	2019		41	0
35	Azizbek Pirmuhamedov	(Uzbekistan)	DF	20 April 2002 (aged 19)	Youth Team	2021		3	0
37	Mukhammadodil Kakhramonov	(Uzbekistan)	DF	10 March 1996 (aged 25)	Metallurg Bekabad	2019		33	1
Midfielders
8	Sanjar Rashidov	(Uzbekistan)	MF	14 July 1993 (aged 28)	Sogdiana Jizzakh	2021		21	0
9	Farrukh Ikramov	(Uzbekistan)	MF	9 July 1998 (aged 23)	Youth Team	2017		72	13
10	Khursid Giyosov	(Uzbekistan)	MF	13 April 1995 (aged 26)	Anyang	2020		121	37
11	Rasul Yuldashev	(Uzbekistan)	MF	26 October 2000 (aged 21)	Youth Team	2020		38	2
13	Lutfulla Turaev	(Uzbekistan)	MF	30 March 1988 (aged 33)	AGMK	2019	2022	163	20
17	Odiljon Abdurakhmanov	(Kyrgyzstan)	MF	18 March 1996 (aged 25)	Alay Osh	2021		25	1
19	Nurillo Tukhtasinov	(Uzbekistan)	MF	19 February 1997 (aged 24)	Sogdiana Jizzakh	2019		107	22
29	Muzaffar Olimjonov	(Uzbekistan)	MF	24 July 2001 (aged 20)	Youth Team	2021		5	0
30	Abdulla Abdullayev	(Uzbekistan)	MF	1 September 1997 (aged 24)	Youth Team	2018		96	2
32	Mironshokh Sattorov	(Uzbekistan)	MF	21 May 2002 (aged 19)	Youth Team	2021		1	0
33	Umarali Rahmonaliyev	(Uzbekistan)	MF	18 August 2003 (aged 18)	Youth Team	2021		6	1
34	Sukhrob Izzatov	(Uzbekistan)	MF	15 February 1999 (aged 22)	Youth Team	2017		62	4
48	Valeriy Akopov	(Uzbekistan)	MF	9 February 2000 (aged 21)	Youth Team	2019		9	0
54	Umid Sultonov	(Uzbekistan)	MF	16 May 2003 (aged 18)	Youth Team	2021		4	0
Forwards
14	Mirjakhon Mirakhmadov	(Uzbekistan)	FW	15 July 1997 (aged 24)	Youth Team	2016		86	24
22	Shakhboz Erkinov	(Uzbekistan)	FW	16 July 1986 (aged 35)		2020	2021	49	8
49	Ibrahim Tomiwa	(Nigeria)	FW	10 May 1998 (aged 23)	Oqtepa	2021	2021	28	9
Youth Team
40	Sudaysi Juraboev	(Uzbekistan)	MF	16 May 2002 (aged 19)	Youth Team	2021	2021	0	0
53	Ulugbek Raimov	(Uzbekistan)	MF	5 March 2003 (aged 18)	Youth Team	2021	2021	0	0
74	Lubomir Bondarenko	(Uzbekistan)	MF	6 August 2002 (aged 19)	Youth Team	2021	2021	0	0
Players away on loan
Players who left during the season
7	Sunnatulla Abdullajonov	(Uzbekistan)	FW	22 October 1996 (aged 25)	Qizilqum Zarafshon	2021		10	0
35	Ibrohim Ibrohimov	(Uzbekistan)	MF	12 January 2001 (aged 20)	Youth Team	2020		8	0

== Transfers ==
=== Winter ===
In: Note: Flags indicate national team as defined under FIFA eligibility rules; some limited exceptions apply. Players may hold more than one non-FIFA nationality.

No.	Pos.	Nation	Player
1	GK	UZB	Ravshanbek Yagudin (from (Uzbekistan) Oqtepa)
3	DF	UZB	Dian Talkhatov (from (Uzbekistan) Sogdiana Jizzakh)
6	DF	UZB	Avazbek Ulmasaliev (from (Uzbekistan) Lokomotiv Tashkent)
7	MF	UZB	Sanjar Rashidov (from (Uzbekistan) Sogdiana Jizzakh)
17	MF	KGZ	Odiljon Abdurakhmanov (from (Kyrgyzstan) Alay Osh)
44	FW	NGR	Ibrahim Tomiwa (from (Uzbekistan) Oqtepa)
77	FW	UZB	Sunnatulla Abdullajonov (from (Uzbekistan) Qizilqum Zarafshon)
91	GK	UZB	Zafar Safaev (from (Uzbekistan) Buxoro)

Out: Note: Flags indicate national team as defined under FIFA eligibility rules; some limited exceptions apply. Players may hold more than one non-FIFA nationality.

No.	Pos.	Nation	Player
1	GK	UZB	Abdumavlon Abdujalilov (to (Uzbekistan) Lokomotiv Tashkent)
2	DF	UZB	Sukhrob Yarashev
3	DF	UZB	Islom Kobilov (to (Uzbekistan) Lokomotiv Tashkent)
5	DF	UZB	Bobur Farhodov (to (Lithuania) Minija Kretinga)
6	DF	UZB	Anvar Gafurov (Retired)
7	DF	UZB	Dilshodbek Axmadaliev (to (Uzbekistan) AGMK)
15	MF	UZB	Gairat Azizkhodjaev
17	MF	UZB	Sanjar Kodirkulov (to (Uzbekistan) Lokomotiv Tashkent)
20	FW	UZB	Vladislav Nuriev (to (Chinese Taipei) CPC Corporation)
22	MF	UZB	Sardor Abduraimov (to (Uzbekistan) Metallurg Bekabad)
23	MF	UZB	Sanjar Rixsiboev
24	FW	UZB	Bahodir Pardaev
25	GK	UZB	Akobir Kayumov (to (Uzbekistan) Istiqlol Fergana)
43	DF	UZB	Ibrokhimkhalil Yuldashev (loan return to (Uzbekistan) Pakhtakor Tashkent)
46	FW	UZB	Azadzhon Azimzhonov
50	GK	UZB	Jasurbek Umrzoqov (to (Uzbekistan) Andijon)
77	FW	TKM	Selim Nurmuradov (to (Lebanon) Al Ahed)

=== Summer ===
In: Note: Flags indicate national team as defined under FIFA eligibility rules; some limited exceptions apply. Players may hold more than one non-FIFA nationality.

No.	Pos.	Nation	Player
7	DF	UZB	Farkhod Mirakhmatov (loan from (Uzbekistan) Navbahor Namangan)

Out: Note: Flags indicate national team as defined under FIFA eligibility rules; some limited exceptions apply. Players may hold more than one non-FIFA nationality.

No.	Pos.	Nation	Player
7	DF	UZB	Sunnatulla Abdullajonov (to (Uzbekistan) Turon Yaypan)
35	DF	UZB	Ibrokhim Ibrokhimov (to (Uzbekistan) Metallurg Bekabad)

== Friendlies ==
2021	–
UZT (UTC+5)

== Competitions ==
=== Overview ===
Competition	First match	Last match	Starting round	Final position	Record							
Competition	First match	Last match	Starting round	Final position	Pld	W	D	L	GF	GA	GD	Win %
Super League	10 March 2021	27 November 2021	Matchday 1	5th	26	13	6	7	43	30	+13	50.00
Uzbekistan Cup	20 April 2021	24 November 2021	Group stage	Semifinal	6	3	3	0	16	4	+12	50.00
Total					32	16	9	7	59	34	+25	50.00

Last updated: 27 November 2021
Source: Competitions

=== Uzbek League ===
==== League table ====
Pos	Team	Pld	W	D	L	GF	GA	GD	Pts	Qualification or relegation
3	AGMK	26	13	8	5	34	25	+9	47 (Note: Sogdiana second on head-to-head points : Sogdiana 4; AGMK 1)	
4	Nasaf	26	13	6	7	42	24	+18	45	Qualification to the AFC Champions League preliminary round (Note: Nasaf qualified to the AFC Champions League as 2021 Uzbekistan Cup champions.)
5	Bunyodkor	26	13	6	7	43	30	+13	45	
6	Navbahor	26	10	9	7	23	19	+4	39	
7	Lokomotiv	26	11	6	9	37	32	+5	39	

Source: Uzbekistan Professional Football League
Rules for classification: 1) points; 2) head-to-head points; 3) head-to-head goal difference; 4) head-to-head away goals scored; 5) goal difference; 6) number of goals scored.

==== Results summary ====
Overall								Home						Away					
Pld	W	D	L	GF	GA	GD	Pts	W	D	L	GF	GA	GD	W	D	L	GF	GA	GD
26	13	6	7	43	30	+13	45	10	3	0	26	11	+15	3	3	7	17	19	−2

Last updated: 27 November 2021.
Source: See Results

==== Results by round ====
Round	1	2	3	4	5	6	7	8	9	10	11	12	13	14	15	16	17	18	19	20	21	22	23	24	25	26
Ground	H	A	H	A	H	A	H	A	H	A	A	A	A	A	H	A	H	A	H	A	H	A	H	H	H	H
Result	W	L	W	D	D	L	W	L	D	W	L	W	L	D	W	W	W	D	W	L	D	L	W	W	W	W
Position	6	7	3	3	5	6	6	7	5	4	7	6	6	6	6	4	4	5	4	5	5	5	5	5	5	5

Source: See Results
A = Away; H = Home; W = Win; D = Draw; L = Loss

==== Results ====
10 March 2021 1	Bunyodkor	1 – 0	Mash'al Mubarek	Tashkent
18:30 UZT (UTC+5)	Tomiwa 49'; S.Rashidov (yellow card) 52'; Ergashev (yellow card) 61'	Report	X.Murtozaev (yellow card) 75'; M.Yuldashev (red card) 82'	Stadium: Milliy Stadium; Attendance: 1,403; Referee: Rustam Lutfullin

16 March 2021 2	Metallurg Bekabad	1 – 0	Bunyodkor	Bekabad
18:30 UZT (UTC+5)	Nurmatov 5'; Andreev (penalty missed) 15' (yellow card) 17'; D.Temirov (yellow card) 40'; Makeyev (yellow card) 69'; D.Narzullaev (yellow card) 81'	Report		Stadium: Metallurg Bekabad Stadium; Attendance: 4,910; Referee: Ilgiz Tantashev

20 March 2021 3	Bunyodkor	3 – 1	Andijon	Tashkent
18:30 UZT (UTC+5)	Erkinov 13' (yellow card) 29'; Tomiwa (red card) 36'; Turaev (yellow card) 44'; N.Tukhtasinov (yellow card) 45+2'; Giyosov 63' (pen.); Abdurakhmanov (yellow card) 70'; M.Mirakhmadov 86'	Report	I.Otaxonov (yellow card) 22'; D.Ismoilov (yellow card) 47'; U.Ismonaliev 76'	Stadium: Milliy Stadium; Attendance: 2,355; Referee: Firdavs Norsafarov

2 April 2021 4	Kokand 1912	0 – 0	Bunyodkor	Kokand
16:15 UZT (UTC+5)	A.Sobirjonov (yellow card) 27'; Lukić (yellow card) 62'	Report	S.Izzatov (yellow card) 57'	Stadium: Kokand Markaziy Stadium; Attendance: 6,542; Referee: Shavkat Nasibullayev

8 April 2021 5	Bunyodkor	2 – 2	Sogdiana Jizzakh	Tashkent
18:30 UZT (UTC+5)	N.Tukhtasinov 42'; Turaev (yellow card) 44'; Giyosov 45+2' (pen.); Ergashev (yellow card) 90+5'	Report	Norkhonov 17' (yellow card) 62'; A.Numonov 44' (yellow card) 90+2'; A.Begimqulov (yellow card) 48'; S.Rashidov (yellow card) 72'; E.Orifov (yellow card) 75'	Stadium: Milliy Stadium; Attendance: 5,100; Referee: Ilgiz Tantashev

16 April 2021 6	Lokomotiv Tashkent	2 – 1	Bunyodkor	Tashkent
18:15 UZT (UTC+5)	K.Mukhtorov (yellow card) 43'; Sidikov 47'; Abdukholiqov 67'; J.Ilyosov (yellow card) 90+6'	Report	Abdurakhmanov 77'	Stadium: Lokomotiv Stadium; Attendance: 2,503; Referee: Shavkat Nasibullayev

4 May 2021 7	Bunyodkor	2 – 0	Nasaf	Tashkent
19:00 UZT (UTC+5)	K.Alikulov 5' (o.g.); N.Tukhtasinov (yellow card) 32' (goal) 56'; F.Ikromov (yellow card) 81'; R.Yagudin (yellow card) 90+2'	Report		Stadium: Milliy Stadium; Attendance: 1,920; Referee: Akobir Shukrullaev

14 May 2021 8	AGMK	3 – 1	Bunyodkor	Olmaliq
18:55 UZT (UTC+5)	Đokić (red card) 34'; Tursunov 58' (pen.), 74'; Komilov (yellow card) 72'; S.Rahmonov 77'; Ergashev (yellow card) 81'; Juraev (yellow card) 90+4'	Report	I.Ibrohimov (yellow card) 12'; M.Mirakhmadov (yellow card) 23'; Giyosov 38' (pen.); Ergashev (yellow card) 41'; R.Yagudin (yellow card) 57'	Stadium: OKMK Sport Majmuasi; Attendance: 2,044; Referee: Ilgiz Tantashev

18 May 2021 9	Bunyodkor	0 – 0	Navbahor Namangan	Tashkent
19:45 UZT (UTC+5)	M.Mirakhmadov (yellow card) 59'; Tomiwa (yellow card) 84'	Report	S.Telyakov (yellow card) 40'; Solovyov (yellow card) 45+1'; S.Mahmudhojiev (yellow card) 88'	Stadium: Milliy Stadium; Attendance: 3,851; Referee: Axrol Riskulloev

19 June 2021 10	Turon Yaypan	0 – 3	Bunyodkor	Yaypan
20:00 UZT (UTC+5)	A.Abdulhaqov (yellow card) 18'; A.Abdurashidov (yellow card) 25'; D.Umirov (yellow card) 29'; M.Muzaffarov (yellow card) 39'; Kasmynin (yellow card) 43'; J.Mehmonov (yellow card) 90+3'; Hojiakbarov (red card) 90+5'	Report	M.Mirakhmadov 32' (yellow card) 55'; F.Ikramov 38' (yellow card) 83'; A.Ulmasaliev (yellow card) 62'; Tomiwa 90+5'	Stadium: Uzbekistan Stadium; Attendance: 6,496; Referee: Rahimbek Karimov

26 June 2021 11	Qizilqum Zarafshon	2 – 1	Bunyodkor	Navoiy
20:00 UZT (UTC+5)	Boydullayev 20' (yellow card) 25'; F.Kambarov (yellow card) 37'; Vatsadze 39'; M.Ubaydullaev (red card) 85'	Report	M.Mirakhmadov (yellow card) 9' (goal) 76'; Turaev (yellow card) 10'; N.Tukhtasinov (yellow card) 35'; S.Izzatov (red card) 85'	Stadium: Yoshlar Stadium; Attendance: 1,567; Referee: Firdavs Norsafarov

4 July 2021 12	Surkhon Termez	1 – 5	Bunyodkor	Termez
20:00 UZT (UTC+5)	Bubanja (yellow card) 54'; M.Bobojonov (yellow card) 72'; J.Xolto‘raev (yellow card) 82'; H.Gofurov 90+3'}	Report	Erkinov 9' (yellow card) 50'; F.Ikramov 40', 62'; A.Abdullayev (yellow card) 45+2'; N.Tukhtasinov (yellow card) 59'; Tomiwa 85', 89'	Stadium: Alpamish Stadium; Attendance: 355; Referee: Akhrol Riskulloev

31 July 2021 13	Pakhtakor Tashkent	1 – 0	Bunyodkor	Tashkent
20:00 UZT (UTC+5)	Sabirkhodjaev (yellow card) 17'; Turgunboev (yellow card) 30'; Ćeran 45+2' (pen.); Hamrobekov (yellow card) 50'	Report	Ergashev (yellow card) 45'	Stadium: Pakhtakor Central Stadium; Attendance: 0 Referee: Asker Najafaliev

6 August 2021 14	Mash'al Mubarek	1 – 1	Bunyodkor	Muborak
20:00 UZT (UTC+5)	S.Allayev 24'; J.Ubaydullaev (yellow card) 72'	Report	F.Miraxmatov (yellow card) 23'; F.Ikromov 77'; Abdurakhmanov (yellow card) 83'; N.Tukhtasinov (red card) 90+1'	Stadium: Bahrom Vafoev Stadium; Attendance: 0 Referee: Shavkat Nasibullayev

13 September 2021 15	Bunyodkor	2 – 0	Metallurg Bekabad	Olmaliq
20:00 UZT (UTC+5)	F.Ikromov 51'; Abdurakhmanov (yellow card) 57'; M.Mirakhmadov 72'	Report	D.Temirov (red card) 18'; Andreev (penalty missed) 44'	Stadium: OKMK Sport Majmuasi; Referee: Zokir Kadyrov

26 August 2021 16	Andijon	1 – 4	Bunyodkor	Andijan
17:00 UZT (UTC+5)	D.Rahimqulov 33'; U.Ismonaliev (yellow card) 62'; E.Adhamov (yellow card) 89'	Report	Tomiwa 30', 52'; M.Mirakhmadov (penalty missed) 63' 64'; F.Ikromov 67'	Stadium: Soghlom Avlod Stadium; Referee: Akhrol Riskulloev

10 September 2021 17	Bunyodkor	2 – 1	Kokand 1912	Tashkent
19:00 UZT (UTC+5)	Turaev 26'; Ergashev 29'	Report	S.Azimov (yellow card) 22'; F.Bekmurodov (yellow card) 34'; Josović 42'; Bamba (yellow card) 89'	Stadium: Milliy Stadium; Referee: Firdavs Norsafarov

16 September 2021 18	Sogdiana Jizzakh	0 – 0	Bunyodkor	Jizzakh
19:00 UZT (UTC+5)	I.Shoyqulov (yellow card) 24'; A.Numonov (yellow card) 90+2'	Report	A.Olmasaliev (yellow card) 18'; Ergashev (yellow card) 48'; Giyosov (yellow card) 58'; S.Rashidov (yellow card) 90+4'	Stadium: Sogdiana Stadium; Referee: Axrol Riskulloev

21 September 2021 19	Bunyodkor	3 – 2	Lokomotiv Tashkent	Tashkent
19:00 UZT (UTC+5)	Giyosov 34', 90+3' (pen.); S.Izzatov (yellow card) 41'; U.Abdullayev (yellow card) 50'; F.Miraxmatov (yellow card) 73'; M.Mirahmadov 90+9'; S.Karimov (yellow card) 90+14'	Report	Abdukholiqov 24' (pen.); G.Gulomov 58'; Kodirkulov (yellow card) 76'; S.Fayziev (yellow card) 79'; K.Mukhtorov (yellow card) 90+10'	Stadium: Milliy Stadium; Attendance: 73; Referee: Zokir Qodirov

27 September 2021 20	Nasaf	5 – 0	Bunyodkor	Qarshi
19:00 UZT (UTC+5)	B.Abdurahimov 9'; K.Norchaev 19', 80'; Stanojević (yellow card) 36'; Bozorov 87' (yellow card) 88'; S.Nurulloev 89'	Report	Abdurakhmanov (yellow card) 38'; Turaev (yellow card) 42'	Stadium: Markaziy Stadium; Attendance: 3,051; Referee: Asker Najafaliyev

2 October 2021 21	Bunyodkor	1 – 1	AGMK	Tashkent
18:00 UZT (UTC+5)	U.Rahmonaliyev (yellow card) 51'; S.Izzatov 63'	Report	Komilov (yellow card) 33'; S.Rahmonov 75'	Stadium: Milliy Stadium; Attendance: 312; Referee: Elyor Tursunov

17 October 2021 22	Navbahor Namangan	2 – 1	Bunyodkor	Namangan
17:00 UZT (UTC+5)	Ruziev (yellow card) 39'; S.Telyakov 58'; Urinboev 60'; Guttiner (yellow card) 90'	Report	Abdurakhmanov (yellow card) 13'; N.Tukhtasinov 49' (yellow card) 54'	Stadium: Markaziy Stadium; Attendance: 5,127; Referee: Akobir Shukrullaev

22 October 2021 23	Bunyodkor	3 – 1	Turon Yaypan	Tashkent
18:15 UZT (UTC+5)	Giyosov 35' (pen.); Turaev (yellow card) 60' (yellow-red card) 65'; U.Rahmonaliyev 90+3'; N.Tukhtasinov 90+6'	Report	D.Ponjević (yellow card) 34' (yellow-red card) 80'; H.Murtazaev 77' (pen.); Hojiakbarov (yellow card) 82'	Stadium: Milliy Stadium; Attendance: 645; Referee: Ilgiz Tantashev

4 November 2021 24	Bunyodkor	1 – 0	Qizilqum Zarafshon	Tashkent
18:15 UZT (UTC+5)	Turaev (yellow card) 42'; N.Tukhtasinov (yellow card) 55'; Abdurakhmanov (yellow card) 61'; A.Abdullayev (yellow card) 79'; M.Kahramonov (yellow card) 85'; Giyosov 90+6' (pen.)	Report	Grigalashvili (yellow card) 13'; I.Kenjaboev (yellow card) 26'; F.Kambarov (yellow card) 43'	Stadium: Milliy Stadium; Attendance: 960; Referee: Elyor Tursunov

20 November 2021 25	Bunyodkor	3 – 1	Surkhon Termez	Tashkent
16:15 UZT (UTC+5)	U.Abdullayev (yellow card) 16'; A.Ulmasaliev 25', 41' (yellow card) 37'; N.Tukhtasinov (yellow card) 64'; Giyosov 68' (pen.); Ergashev (yellow card) 74'	Report	M.Bobojonov 34'; R.Nortojiev (yellow card) 68'; O.Choriyev (yellow card) 83'	Stadium: Milliy Stadium; Attendance: 670; Referee: Vadim Agishev

27 November 2021 26	Bunyodkor	3 – 2	Pakhtakor Tashkent	Tashkent
15:00 UZT (UTC+5)	Giyosov 1' (yellow card) 81'; M.Mirakhmadov 77', 85'; Turaev (yellow card) 79'	Report	S.Temirov 26'; Mukhiddinov 38'	Stadium: Milliy Stadium; Attendance: 1,234; Referee: Sultonmurod Abdurahmonov

=== Uzbek Cup ===
==== Group stage ====
20 April 2021 1	Rubin	0 – 10	Bunyodkor	Tashkent
18:30 UZT (UTC+5)	S.Zhalilov (yellow card) 50'; A.Bakhritdinov (yellow card) 78'; S.Farrukh (yellow card) 81'	Report	A.Ulmasaliev 7'; Erkinov 12'; Turaev 38'; F.Ikramov 57', 88', 89'; Tomiwa 64', 76'; B.Abdullayev 68'; R.Yuldashev 78'; M.Sattorov (yellow card) 87'	Stadium: Milliy Stadium; Attendance: 315; Referee: Rakhimbek Karimov

24 April 2021 2	Bunyodkor	1 – 1	Sogdiana Jizzakh	Tashkent
18:30 UZT (UTC+5)	Turaev (yellow card) 25'; S.Zhurabekov 65' (o.g.)	Report	D.Nasriddinov 5' (yellow card) 58'; E.Ismailov (yellow card) 44'; I.Shoikulov (yellow card) 77'	Stadium: Milliy Stadium; Attendance: 1,861; Referee: Vadim Agishev

28 April 2021 3	Nasaf	1 – 1	Bunyodkor	Qarshi
18:45 UZT (UTC+5)	Aliqulov 4'; M.Khudzhamberdiev (yellow card) 73'	Report	M.Mirakhmadov 46'; Ergashev (yellow card) 90+1'	Stadium: Markaziy Stadium; Attendance: 7,480; Referee: Shavkat Nasibullaev

==== Knockout stage ====
20 August 2021 Last 16	Bunyodkor	1 – 0	Navbahor Namangan	Tashkent
19:00 UZT (UTC+5)	F.Ikramov 42'; Abdurakhmanov (yellow card) 63'; S.Rashidov (yellow card) 76'	Report	Guttiner (yellow card) 15'	Stadium: Milliy Stadium; Referee: Vadim Agishev

28 October 2021 Quarterfinal	Bunyodkor	2 – 1	Surkhon Termez	Tashkent
18:15 UZT (UTC+5)	S.Izzatov 15'; Tomiwa 64'; R.Yagudin (yellow card) 81'	Report	J.Akhmadov (yellow card) 44'; Z.Kholturaev (yellow card) 75'; I.Toshpulatov 77'; A.Yusupov (yellow card) 85'	Stadium: Milliy Stadium; Attendance: 544; Referee: Rakhimbek Karimov

24 November 2021 Semifinal	Pakhtakor Tashkent	1 – 1 (a.e.t.) (5 – 4 p)	Bunyodkor	Tashkent
17:30 UZT (UTC+5)	Ćeran (red card) 21'; Hamrobekov (yellow card) 21'; Erkinov 41'; Ismoilov (yellow card) 77'; Ismailov (yellow card) 90+1'; S.Azmiddinov (yellow card) 92'; Azamov (red card) 120+2'	Report	Giyosov 29'; Tomiwa (yellow card) 64'; Ergashev (yellow card) 68'	Stadium: Pakhtakor Central Stadium; Attendance: 3,990; Referee: Akobir Shukrullaev
	Penalties
	S.Azmiddinov (penalty scored); Matić (penalty scored); Turgunboev (penalty scored); Sayfiev (penalty scored); Khamdamov (penalty scored)		Erkinov (penalty missed); A.Abdullayev (penalty scored); Giyosov (penalty scored); Ergashev (penalty scored); N.Tukhtasinov (penalty scored)

== Squad statistics ==
As of match played 27 November 2021

=== Appearances and goals ===
No.	Pos	Nat	Player	Total		Uzbek Super League		Uzbek Cup	
No.	Pos	Nat	Player	Apps	Goals	Apps	Goals	Apps	Goals
1	GK	(Uzbekistan) UZB	Ravshanbek Yagudin	18	0	14	0	4	0
3	DF	(Uzbekistan) UZB	Dian Talxatov	2	0	0+2	0	0	0
4	DF	(Tajikistan) TJK	Davron Ergashev	27	1	20+2	1	3+2	0
6	DF	(Uzbekistan) UZB	Avazbek Ulmasaliev	24	3	18	2	6	1
7	DF	(Uzbekistan) UZB	Farxod Miraxmatov	11	0	2+7	0	0+2	0
8	MF	(Uzbekistan) UZB	Sanjar Rashidov	21	0	3+14	0	1+3	0
9	MF	(Uzbekistan) UZB	Farrukh Ikromov	20	10	10+6	6	4	4
10	MF	(Uzbekistan) UZB	Khursid Giyosov	29	10	24+1	9	4	1
11	MF	(Uzbekistan) UZB	Rasul Yuldashev	15	1	10+2	0	1+2	1
13	MF	(Uzbekistan) UZB	Lutfulla Turaev	29	2	22+2	1	5	1
14	FW	(Uzbekistan) UZB	Mirjakhon Mirakhmadov	24	9	18+2	8	2+2	1
17	MF	(Kyrgyzstan) KGZ	Odiljon Abdurakhmanov	25	1	17+3	1	5	0
19	MF	(Uzbekistan) UZB	Nurillo Tukhtasinov	27	4	22+1	4	4	0
22	FW	(Uzbekistan) UZB	Shakhboz Erkinov	25	3	5+15	2	3+2	1
24	DF	(Uzbekistan) UZB	Bek Abdullayev	1	1	0	0	1	1
26	DF	(Uzbekistan) UZB	Ulugbek Abdullayev	20	0	15+2	0	3	0
29	MF	(Uzbekistan) UZB	Muzaffar Olimjonov	5	0	0+3	0	1+1	0
30	MF	(Uzbekistan) UZB	Abdulla Abdullayev	32	0	26	0	6	0
32	MF	(Uzbekistan) UZB	Mironshokh Sattorov	1	0	0	0	1	0
33	MF	(Uzbekistan) UZB	Umarali Rahmonaliyev	6	1	2+2	1	0+2	0
34	MF	(Uzbekistan) UZB	Suhrob Izzatov	25	2	15+4	1	6	1
35	DF	(Uzbekistan) UZB	Azizbek Pirmuhamedov	3	0	0+2	0	0+1	0
37	DF	(Uzbekistan) UZB	Mukhammadodil Kakhramonov	19	0	7+9	0	2+1	0
49	FW	(Nigeria) NGR	Ibrahim Tomiwa	28	9	17+6	6	3+2	3
54	MF	(Uzbekistan) UZB	Umid Sultonov	4	0	0+3	0	0+1	0
71	GK	(Uzbekistan) UZB	Sarvar Karimov	12	0	9+1	0	2	0
91	GK	(Uzbekistan) UZB	Zafar Safaev	3	0	3	0	0	0
Players away on loan:
Players who left Bunyodkor during the season:
7	FW	(Uzbekistan) UZB	Sunnatulla Abdullajonov	11	0	4+5	0	1+1	0
35	MF	(Uzbekistan) UZB	Ibrohim Ibrohimov	5	0	3	0	0+2	0

=== Goal scorers ===
Place	Position	Nation	Number	Name	Uzbek Super League	Uzbekistan Cup	Total
1	MF	(Uzbekistan)	10	Khursid Giyosov	9	1	10
1	MF	(Uzbekistan)	9	Farrukh Ikromov	6	4	10
3	FW	(Uzbekistan)	14	Mirjakhon Mirakhmadov	8	1	9
3	FW	(Nigeria)	44	Ibrahim Tomiwa	6	3	9
5	MF	(Uzbekistan)	19	Nurillo Tukhtasinov	4	0	4
6	FW	(Uzbekistan)	22	Shakhboz Erkinov	2	1	3
6	DF	(Uzbekistan)	6	Avazbek Ulmasaliev	2	1	3
8	MF	(Uzbekistan)	13	Lutfulla Turaev	1	1	2
8	MF	(Uzbekistan)	34	Suhrob Izzatov	1	1	2
8				Own goal	1	1	2
11	MF	(Kyrgyzstan)	17	Odiljon Abdurakhmanov	1	0	1
11	DF	(Tajikistan)	4	Davron Ergashev	1	0	1
11	DF	(Uzbekistan)	33	Umarali Rahmonaliyev	1	0	1
11	DF	(Uzbekistan)	24	Bek Abdullayev	0	1	1
11	MF	(Uzbekistan)	11	Rasul Yuldashev	0	1	1
				TOTALS	43	16	59

=== Clean sheets ===
Place	Position	Nation	Number	Name	Uzbek Super League	Uzbekistan Cup	Total
1	GK	(Uzbekistan)	1	Ravshanbek Yagudin	4	1	5
2	GK	(Uzbekistan)	71	Sarvar Karimov	3	1	4
				TOTALS	7	2	9

=== Disciplinary record ===
Number	Nation	Position	Name	Uzbek Super League		Uzbekistan Cup		Total	
Number	Nation	Position	Name	Yellow card	Red card	Yellow card	Red card	Yellow card	Red card
1	(Uzbekistan)	GK	Ravshanbek Yagudin	2	0	1	0	3	0
4	(Tajikistan)	DF	Davron Ergashev	6	0	2	0	8	0
6	(Uzbekistan)	DF	Avazbek Ulmasaliev	3	0	0	0	3	0
7	(Uzbekistan)	DF	Farxod Miraxmatov	2	0	0	0	2	0
8	(Uzbekistan)	MF	Sanjar Rashidov	2	0	1	0	3	0
9	(Uzbekistan)	MF	Farrukh Ikromov	2	0	0	0	2	0
10	(Uzbekistan)	MF	Khursid Giyosov	2	0	0	0	2	0
13	(Uzbekistan)	MF	Lutfulla Turaev	8	1	1	0	9	1
14	(Uzbekistan)	FW	Mirjakhon Mirakhmadov	4	0	0	0	4	0
17	(Kyrgyzstan)	MF	Odiljon Abdurakhmanov	6	0	1	0	7	0
19	(Uzbekistan)	MF	Nurillo Tukhtasinov	7	1	0	0	7	1
22	(Uzbekistan)	FW	Shakhboz Erkinov	2	0	0	0	2	0
26	(Uzbekistan)	DF	Ulugbek Abdullayev	2	0	0	0	2	0
30	(Uzbekistan)	MF	Abdulla Abdullayev	2	0	0	0	2	0
32	(Uzbekistan)	MF	Mironshokh Sattorov	0	0	1	0	1	0
33	(Uzbekistan)	DF	Umarali Rahmonaliyev	1	0	0	0	1	0
34	(Uzbekistan)	MF	Suhrob Izzatov	2	1	0	0	2	1
35	(Uzbekistan)	MF	Ibrohim Ibrohimov	1	0	0	0	1	0
37	(Uzbekistan)	DF	Mukhammadodil Kakhramonov	1	0	0	0	1	0
44	(Nigeria)	FW	Ibrahim Tomiwa	1	1	1	0	2	1
71	(Uzbekistan)	GK	Sarvar Karimov	1	0	0	0	1	0
Players who left Bunyodkor during the season:
			TOTALS	57	4	8	0	65	4
