= Lapshin =

Lapshin (Russian: Лапшин, from лапша meaning noodles) is a Russian masculine surname, its feminine counterpart is Lapshina. It may refer to

- Igor Lapshin (born 1963), Russian triple jumper
- Konstantin Lapshin, London-based Russian pianist
- Mikhail Lapshin (1934–2006), Russian former President of the Altai Republic
- Pavlo Lapshyn, Ukrainian terrorist
- Sergei Lapshin (born 1974), Russian football coach and a former player
- Timofey Lapshin (born 1988), South Korean biathlete.

== See also ==
- My Friend Ivan Lapshin, a 1984 Soviet criminal drama film
