= Pletnyov =

Pletnyov (Russian: Плетнёв; masculine) or Pletnyova (Плетнёва; feminine) is a Russian surname. An alternative spelling is Pletnev. It may refer to the following people:

- Andrei Pletnyov (born 1971), Russian football player and referee
- Anna Pletnyova (born 1977), Russian singer, composer, songwriter and member of Russian pop-group Vintage
- Dmitri Pletnyov (born 1999), Russian footballer
- Dmitry Pletnyov (doctor) (born 1871 or 1872 - 1941), Russian doctor and medical scientist. Executed by the NKVD in 1941.
- Mikhail Pletnev (born 1957), Russian pianist, conductor and composer
- Nina Otkalenko (born Pletnyova, 1928–2015), Russian runner
- Pyotr Pletnyov (1792–1866), Russian poet and critic
- Svetlana Pletnyova (1926–2008), Russian archaeologist and historian
- Valerian Pletnev, Russian joiner and playwright
