= Konstantin Lapshin =

London-based Russian - British pianist

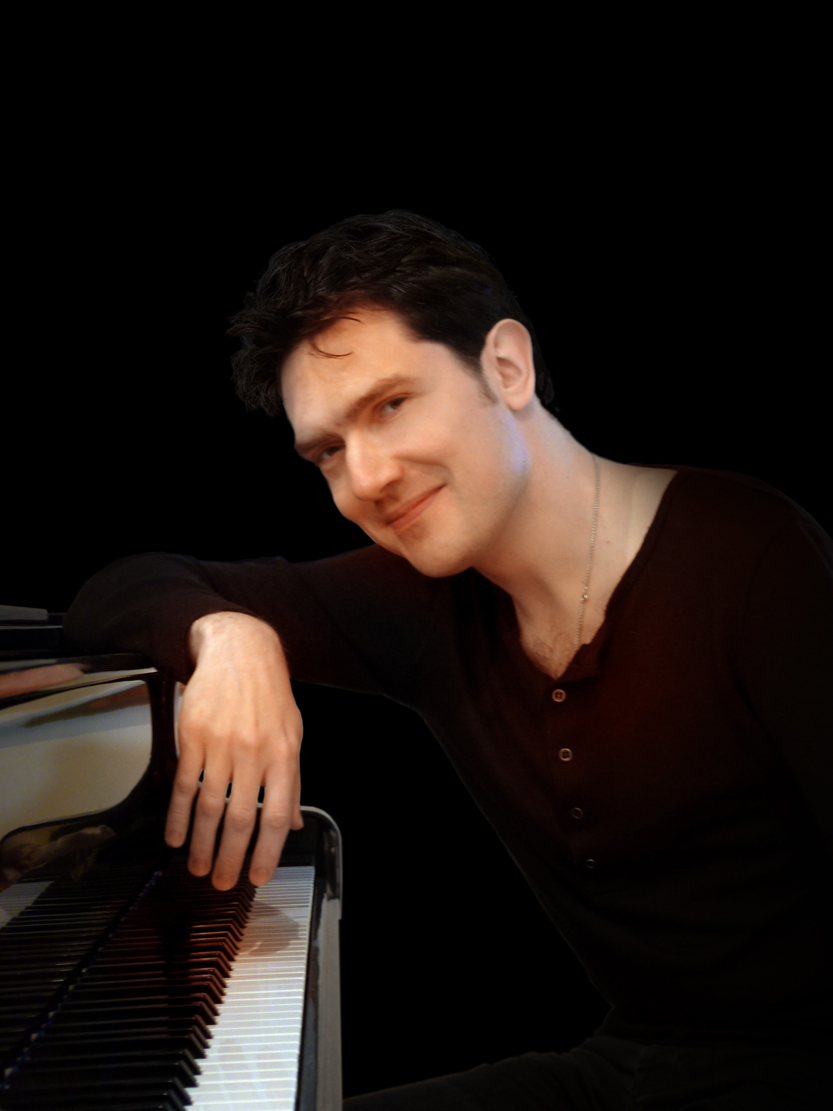
- Konstantin Lapshin, 2011

Background information
- Born: Konstantin Lapshin
- Genres: Art music
- Occupation: Pianist
- Instrument: Piano
- Label: Classical Records (2009)
- Website: www.konstantinlapshin.com

Konstantin Lapshin (Russian: Константи́н Лапши́н) is a London-based Russian - British pianist. He is a prize-winner in numerous international competitions.

In 2009, Lapshin completed his Master of Music degree at the Royal College of Music following his full scholarship studies with Vanessa Latarche. While at the RCM, he received the Queen Elizabeth the Queen Mother Rose Bowl, as the most distinguished student. As a result, he played for Prince Charles. Lapshin then went on to take the Artist Diploma in addition to being awarded the Mills Williams Junior Fellow. In the same year he was nominated for Rising Star and performed at Cadogan Hall in London. He is supported by the Worshipful Company of Musicians and is a Concordia Foundation and Kirckman Concert Society artist.

Before moving to London, Lapshin completed his studies at the Moscow P. I. Tchaikovsky Conservatory under Lev Naumov and Mikhail Voskresensky. He is a major prize-winner of more than 15 national and international competitions, including Schubert International Piano Competition in Dortmund (Germany), Maria Yudina International Piano Competition in Saint Petersburg (Russia), the First Gnesin International Piano Competition in Moscow (Russia), Rachmaninov International Piano Competition (Russia), Novosibirsk International Piano Competition (Russia) and Haverhill Sinfonia Soloist Competition (UK). He also won second prize at Isidor Bajic International Piano Competition (Serbia), first prize at Mendelssohn Cup Competition in Taurisano (Italy), first and public prizes at Schumann Prize International Competition in Lamporecchio (Italy).

Lapshin has given recitals and made concerto appearances at various concert halls throughout the UK and Europe including Wigmore Hall in London, Purcell Room at the South Bank Centre, Cadogan Hall, Steinway Hall, Drapers’ Hall, St. Martin-in-the-Fields, St. George's, Hanover Square, Pushkin House, Bridgewater Hall in Manchester, Salle Cortot in Paris. He has also been performing extensively in Russia. The most important venues include: Great and Small Halls of Moscow Conservatory, Rachmaninov Hall of Moscow Conservatory, Zerkalny Hall, Tchaikovsky Arts Centre and Assembly Hall of the Cathedral of Christ the Saviour in Moscow. He appeared at the 2005 festival "Yamaha presents" (Gradus and Parnassum) in Moscow, the 2006 festival "In Memory of V. Lotar-Shevchenko" in Novosibirsk, the 2007 festival "All Mozart’s Concertos" in Volgograd with the Volgograd Symphony Orchestra (conductor E. Serov).

His other engagements include performances with the Dortmunder Philharmoniker (conductor Dirk Kaftan), the Timișoara Philharmonic Orchestra (conductor Radu Popu), Novosibirsk Symphony Orchestra under V. Bushkov, Saratov Symphony Orchestra and Volgograd Symphony under the baton of E. Serov, and de Havilland Philharmonic under Robin Browning (UK). Performances of Lapshin were broadcast on the Orpheus Radio (Moscow) as well as national radio in Serbia and Poland.

In the autumn of 2009, Lapshin made his debut on Classical Records with a CD including works by Tchaikovsky/Pletnev and Schumann. The CD received an outstanding review in Fanfare Magazine (USA).

== Education ==
- 2009–2010 Artist Diploma at the Royal College of Music, class of Vanessa Latarche, Mills Williams Junior Fellowship at the RCM
- 2007–2009 Associated Board Scholar at the Royal College of Music (Masters Programme in Performance, class of Vanessa Latarche), with Distinction
- 2003–2005 Postgraduate course at the Moscow P. I. Tchaikovsky Conservatory (class of Prof. Mikhail Voskresensky)
- 1997–2003 Diploma with Distinction at the Moscow P. I. Tchaikovsky Conservatory (class of Prof. Lev Naumov)
- 1993–1997 Diploma with Distinction at the Gnesin State Musical College (class of I. Naumova)

== Competitions/awards ==
- 2010 First prize of Schumann Piano Competition, Tuscany, Italy
- 2010 The Queen Elizabeth Rose Bowl — the highest RCM award which includes the opportunity to play for Prince Charles
- 2010 A prize-winner of the Worshipful Company of Musicians
- 2010 A Concordia Foundation artist for 2010–2011.
- 2010 First prize of the International Piano Competition in Taurisano (Italy)
- 2010 Second prize of the Isidor Bajic International Piano Competition in Novi Sad (Serbia)
- 2009 Schumann RCM Piano Competition—First prize
- 2008 Third prize of the International Piano Competition "In memory of V. Lotar-Shevchenko" in Novosibirsk (Russia)
- 2008 First prize (the Chappell Medal) of the RCM Chappell Piano Competition
- 2008 First prize (RCM Kendall Taylor Beethoven) of Beethoven Competition at the RCM
- 2008 Winner of Concerto Competition at the RCM
- 2008 First prize of Hatfield and District Music Festival
- 2005 Fourth prize of the Schubert International Piano Competition in Dortmund (Germany)
- 2005 Second prize of the Maria Yudina International Piano Competition in St. Petersburg (1st was not awarded)
- 2004 Diploma of the festival ‘Musical Holiday’ in Piatra Neamț (Romania)
- 2002 Prize for the best performance of Rachmaninov’s Polka W.R. at the International Rachmaninov Piano Competition in Moscow
- 2002–2003 Rostropovich Award (Moscow)
- 2001 Diploma of the International Piano Competition in Kitzingen (Germany)
- 1996 First prize of the International Gnessins Piano Competition in Moscow, 3rd prize of the International Competition ‘Classical Heritage’ in Moscow (Chamber Ensemble)
- 1993 First prize of Tchaikovsky Piano Competition for Young Musicians (Moscow region)
- Before 1993 First prizes of 5 regional competitions for young musicians

== Discography ==
=== Studio recordings ===
2009 A CD release for Classical Records label. The CD includes Schumann ‘Kreisleriana’ and Mikhail Pletnev transcription of Tchaikovsky suite "Sleeping Beauty"
