= Davronjon Ergashev =

Tajikistani footballer

Davronzhon Ergashev
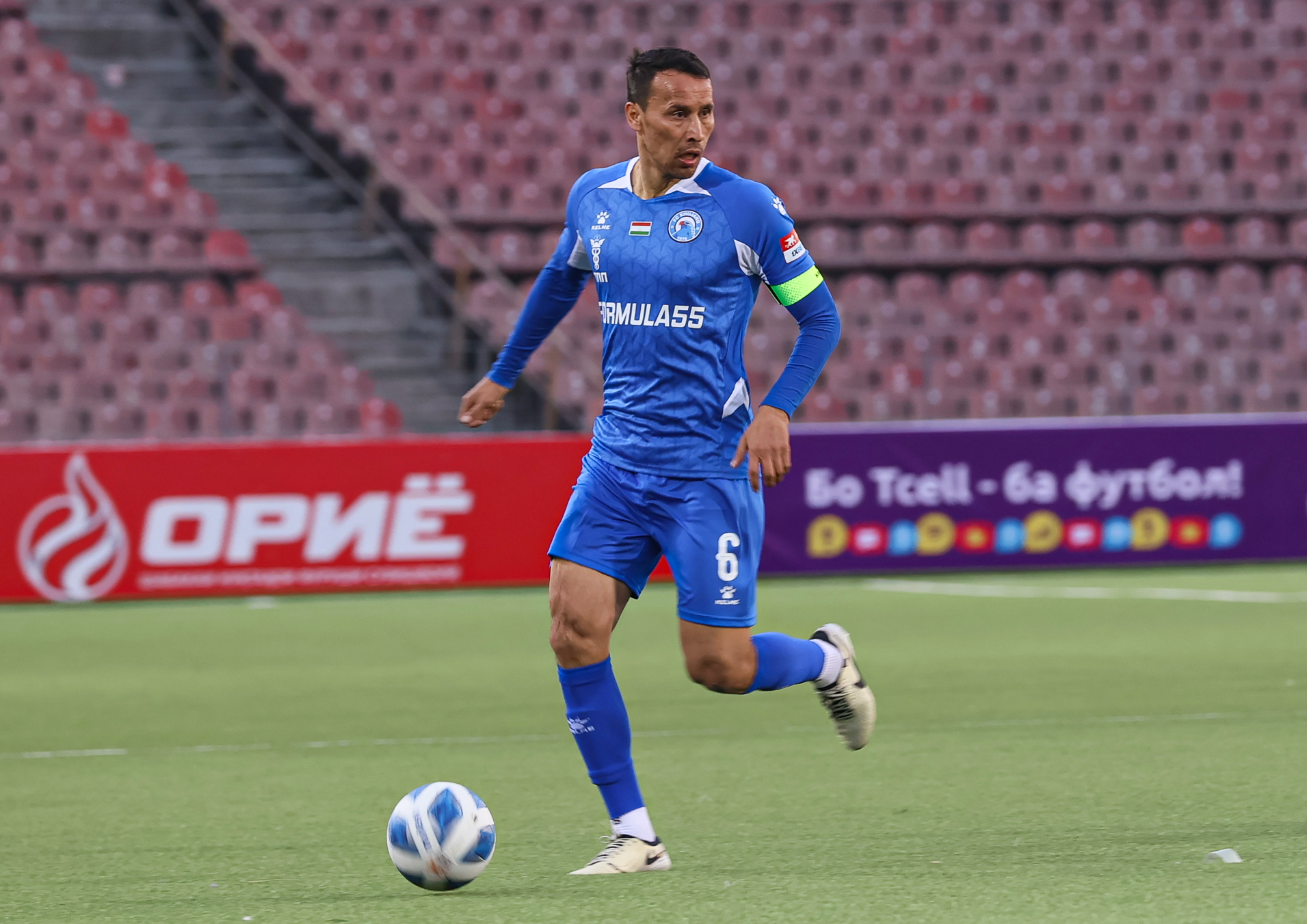

Personal information
- Full name: Davronzhon Sodirovich Ergashev
- Date of birth: 19 March 1988 (age 38)
- Place of birth: Shaydon, Tajik SSR, Soviet Union
- Height: 1.84 m (6 ft 0 in)
- Position: Centre-back

Team information
- Current team: Khujand
- Number: 6

Senior career*
Years	Team	Apps	(Gls)
2008	Khujand		
2009–2010	Regar-TadAZ Tursunzoda		
2011–2012	Istiklol		
2013	Zhetysu	28	(1)
2014	Gabala	9	(0)
2014–2015	Zhetysu	30	(0)
2016	Istiklol	6	(0)
2016–2017	Taraz	34	(1)
2018	Istiklol	5	(0)
2019	Khujand	18	(2)
2020–2023	Bunyodkor	72	(2)
2023–2024	Metallurg Bekabad	9	(0)
2024–	Khujand	29	(6)

International career^{‡}
2008–2022	Tajikistan	72	(8)
- * Club domestic league appearances and goals as of 16 March 2026 ‡ National team caps and goals as of 10:41, 2 June 2022 (UTC)

Davronzhon Sodirovich Ergashev (Tajik: Даврончон Содирович Эргашев, Russian: ‌Давронжон Содирович Эргашев), born 19 March 1988) is a Tajik professional footballer who plays as a centre-back for Tajikistan Higher League club Khujand and the Tajikistan national team.

== Club career ==
=== Istiklol ===
Ergashev previously played for Regar-TadAZ Tursunzoda and Istiklol. After his contract with Istiqlol expired, in February 2013 he was on trial in Irtysh Pavlodar.

=== Zhetysu ===
Ergashev signed for FC Zhetysu prior to the start of the 2013 season, making his debut on 9 March 2013 against FC Kairat.

=== Gabala ===
In January 2014, Ergashev went on trial with Azerbaijan Premier League side Gabala, signing a six-month contract with Gabala on 25 January 2014.

=== Zhetysu return ===
Following the expiration of his Gabala contract, Ergashev re-signed for FC Zhetysu.

=== Taraz ===
In June 2016, Ergashev left FC Istiklol, returning to the Kazakhstan Premier League by signing for FC Taraz. In January 2017, Ergashev extended his contract for an additional year, seeing him play for Taraz until the end of the 2017 season.

=== Khujand ===
On 29 January 2019, Ergashev signed for FK Khujand, returning to the club after 10-years away.

=== Bunyodkor ===
On 8 January 2020, Bunyodkor announced the signing of Ergashev.

=== Metallurg Bekabad ===
On 24 December 2023, Metallurg Bekabad announced the signing of Ergashev.

=== Second Khujand return ===
On 20 July 2024, FK Khujand announced the signing of Ergashev on a contract until the end of 2024.

== International career ==
Ergashev played for the Tajikistan national team in 2008 AFC Challenge Cup, 2010 AFC Challenge Cup, 2012 AFC Challenge Cup.

== Career statistics ==
=== Club ===
As of match played 1 December 2023

Appearances and goals by club, season and competition
Club	Season	League			National cup		Continental		Other		Total	
Club	Season	Division	Apps	Goals	Apps	Goals	Apps	Goals	Apps	Goals	Apps	Goals
Zhetysu	2013	Kazakhstan Premier League	28	1	0	0	–		–		28	1
Gabala	2013–14	Azerbaijan Premier League	9	0	4	0	–		–		13	0
Zhetysu	2014	Kazakhstan Premier League	12	0	0	0	–		–		12	0
Zhetysu	2015	Kazakhstan Premier League	18	0	0	0	–		–		18	0
Zhetysu	Total		30	0	0	0	0	0	0	0	30	0
Istiklol	2016	Tajikistan Higher League	6	0	0	0	4	0	1	1	11	1
Taraz	2016	Kazakhstan Premier League	14	1	0	0	–		–		14	1
Taraz	2017	Kazakhstan Premier League	20	0	1	0	–		–		21	0
Taraz	Total		34	1	1	0	0	0	0	0	35	1
Istiklol	2018	Tajikistan Higher League	5	0	0	0	6	0	0	0	11	0
Khujand	2019	Tajikistan Higher League	18	2			8	1	–		26	3
Bunyodkor	2020	Uzbekistan Super League	8	0	0	0	1	0	–		9	0
Bunyodkor	2021	Uzbekistan Super League	22	1	5	0	–		–		27	1
Bunyodkor	2022	Uzbekistan Super League	23	0	4	1	–		–		27	1
Bunyodkor	2023	Uzbekistan Super League	19	1	2	0	–		–		21	1
Bunyodkor	Total		72	2	11	1	1	0	0	0	84	3
Career total			202	6	16	1	19	1	1	1	238	9

=== International ===
As of match played 1 June 2022

Appearances and goals by national team and year
National team	Year	Apps	Goals
Tajikistan	2008	5	0
Tajikistan	2009	1	0
Tajikistan	2010	7	0
Tajikistan	2011	10	2
Tajikistan	2012	6	1
Tajikistan	2013	3	0
Tajikistan	2014	4	1
Tajikistan	2015	5	0
Tajikistan	2016	5	2
Tajikistan	2017	6	0
Tajikistan	2018	1	0
Tajikistan	2019	5	1
Tajikistan	2020	3	1
Tajikistan	2021	8	0
Tajikistan	2022	3	0
Total		72	8

Scores and results list Tajikistan's goal tally first.

No.	Date	Venue	Opponent	Score	Result	Competition
1.	23 March 2011	Galolhu National Stadium, Malé	Cambodia	2–0	3–0	2012 AFC Challenge Cup qualification
2.	29 March 2011	Sugathadasa Stadium, Colombo	Sri Lanka	1–0	2–0	Friendly
3	5 September 2012	Audi Sportpark, Ingolstadt	Qatar	1–0	2–1	Friendly
4	8 August 2014	Pamir Stadium, Dushanbe	Malaysia	1–0	4–1	Friendly
5.	2 June 2016	Pamir Stadium, Dushanbe	Bangladesh	5–0	5–0	2019 AFC Asian Cup qualification
6.	5 October 2016	Pamir Stadium, Dushanbe	Palestine	2–2	3–3	Friendly
7.	10 September 2019	MFF Football Centre, Ulaanbaatar	Mongolia	1–0	1–0	2022 FIFA World Cup qualification
8.	12 November 2020	Zabeel Stadium, Dubai	United Arab Emirates	1–0	2–3	Friendly

== Honours ==
Khujand

- Tajikistan Cup: 2008

Istiklol

- Tajik League: 2011, 2016, 2018
- Tajikistan Cup: 2016, 2018
- AFC President's Cup: 2012
- Tajik Supercup: 2016
