= Ibrahim Tomiwa Gbadamosi =

Nigerian association football player

Personal information
- Full name: Ibrahim Tomiwa Gbadamosi
- Date of birth: 10 May 1998 (age 28)
- Place of birth: Lagos, Nigeria
- Height: 1.79 m (5 ft 10 in)
- Position: Striker

Ibrahim Tomiwa Gbadamosi (born in Lagos 10 May 1998) is a Nigerian association football player.

== Career ==
Tomiwa played for the Remo Stars F.C. as a youth. In 2017, he moved to Portugal and joined the C.D. Feirense. He was later loaned out to G.D. Gafanha and A.C. Famalicão.

From 2018 to 2020, Tomiwa did not play for a team. In 2020, he signed with FC Oqtepa in Uzbekistan. He was loaned to Qizilqum FC and FC Bunyodkor. He played with Qizilqum in the Uzbekistan Super League that season after he and Bunyodkor were not able to come to a financial agreement. Bunyodkor signed him for the 2022 season.

In mid-January 2023, Tomiwa signed with PT Prachuap F.C. in Thailand. He made seven top-flight appearances for them.

In the summer of 2023, Tomiwa moved to Sweden after joining Newroz FC.

In 2024, Tomiwa began playing for the Al Batin FC. On 18 December 2024, he scored two goals for his team, earning a victory for the Desert Knights, their fourth game win of fourteen matches at that point in the season. In 2025, he played for Al-Zawraa SC.

=== Accolades ===
During his time with Oqtepa, Tomiwa earned two "Man of the Match" awards. In his first match with Qizilqum in August 2020, Tomiwa received another "Man of the Match" award for scoring the only goal in the game and earning Qizilqum their first victory of the season.

== Sources ==
- "O'zPFL quyi liga klublari uchun legionerlar to'lovi ikki barobar kamaytirildi" [Fees for lower league clubs halved]. Std.uz (in Uzbek). 11 September 2020.
- Al-Samarraie, Jawad (13 May 2025). "Al-Zawra'a and Al-Shorta both win to stay level on points in tight Iraqi Stars League title race". Iraqi News.
- Jasurbek, Aslanov (1 March 2021). ""Bunyodkor" nigeriyalik hujumchi bilan shartnoma imzoladi" [Bunyodkor signs Nigerian striker]. Championat Asia (in Uzbek).
- Saydullayev, Narzulla (2 September 2020). "Alisher Shog'ulomov: "Ibrohim Tomivani "Bunyodkor"ga o'tishini istagan edim. Lekin..."" [Alisher Shog'ulomov: "I wanted Ibrahim Tomiwa to play for Bunyodkor. But..."]. Championat Asia (in Uzbek).
- Sir Kris (19 December 2024). "Nigerian forward Ibrahim Tomiwa bags brace, eases Al-Batin's relegation fears". Football Rover.
- Tobex, Oluchi (19 August 2020). "Ibrahim Gbadamosi Scores In His Debut Match For Qizilqum; Wins The Man Of The Match Award". Sports 247.
