= Dmitry Pletnyov (footballer) =

Russian footballer

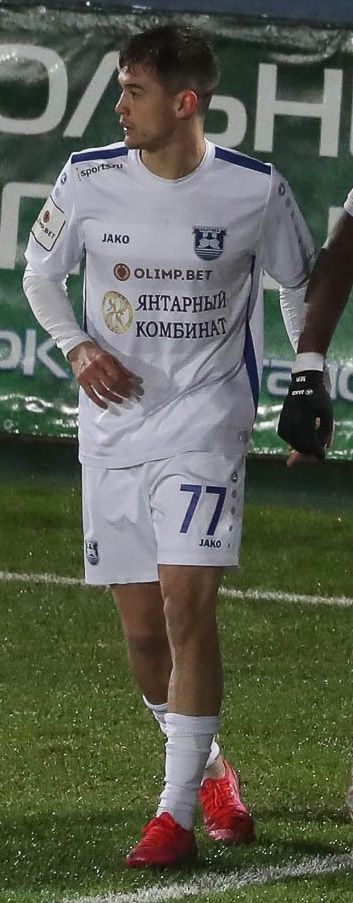
- Pletnyov with Baltika in 2021

Personal information
- Full name: Dmitry Andreyevich Pletnyov
- Date of birth: 16 January 1998 (age 28)
- Place of birth: Saint Petersburg, Russia
- Height: 1.73 m (5 ft 8 in)
- Position: Midfielder

Team information
- Current team: Bunyodkor
- Number: 8

Senior career*
Years	Team	Apps	(Gls)
2015–2020	Zenit Saint Petersburg	1	(0)
2017–2019	→ Zenit-2 Saint Petersburg	41	(2)
2019–2020	→ Tom Tomsk (loan)	21	(2)
2020–2021	Baltika Kaliningrad	5	(1)
2021	Dynamo Saint Petersburg	16	(4)
2022	Atyrau	23	(1)
2023	Arsenal Dzerzhinsk	10	(4)
2023	Slutsk	8	(3)
2024–2025	Surkhon Termez	36	(2)
2025	Dinamo Samarqand	14	(2)
2026–	Bunyodkor	11	(0)

International career
2014–2015	Russia U17	29	(5)
2015–2016	Russia U18	7	(0)
2020	Russia U20	1	(0)
- * Club domestic league appearances and goals as of 29 July 2026

Dmitry Andreyevich Pletnyov (Russian: Дмитрий Андреевич Плетнёв; born 16 January 1998) is a Russian professional footballer who plays for Uzbekistan Super League club Bunyodkor.

== Club career ==
He made his debut in the Russian Football National League for FC Zenit-2 Saint Petersburg on 6 September 2017 in a game against FC Rotor Volgograd.

He made his Russian Premier League debut for FC Zenit Saint Petersburg on 5 May 2018 in a game against FC Lokomotiv Moscow.

On 18 September 2020 he signed a 3-year contract with FC Baltika Kaliningrad. He left Baltika on 7 June 2021.

== International career ==
He played for Russia national under-17 football team at the 2015 UEFA European Under-17 Championship and 2015 FIFA U-17 World Cup.

== Personal life ==
His father Andrei Pletnyov was also a football player.

== Career statistics ==
As of 16 July 2019

Club	Season	League			Cup		Continental		Total	
Club	Season	Division	Apps	Goals	Apps	Goals	Apps	Goals	Apps	Goals
Zenit St. Petersburg	2015–16	Premier League	0	0	0	0	0	0	0	0
Zenit St. Petersburg	2016–17	Premier League	0	0	0	0	0	0	0	0
Zenit St. Petersburg	2017–18	Premier League	1	0	0	0	0	0	1	0
Zenit St. Petersburg	Total		1	0	0	0	0	0	1	0
Zenit-2 St. Petersburg	2017–18	FNL	16	1	–		–		16	1
Zenit-2 St. Petersburg	2018–19	FNL	25	1	–		–		25	1
Zenit-2 St. Petersburg	Total		41	2	0	0	0	0	41	2
Tom Tomsk	2019–20	FNL	1	0	0	0	0	0	1	0
Tom Tomsk	Total		1	0	0	0	0	0	1	0
Career total			43	2	0	0	0	0	43	2
