= FC Bunyodkor =

Association football club in Uzbekistan

Bunyodkor
- Full name: Football Club Bunyodkor
- Nicknames: Uzbek: Qaldirg'ochlar; The Swallows; Uzbek: Osiyo Barselonasi; Asian Barcelona
- Short name: Bunyodkor
- Founded: 2005; 21 years ago
- Ground: Bunyodkor Stadium
- Capacity: 34,000
- Manager: Ilyos Zeytulayev
- League: Uzbekistan Super League
- 2025: Uzbekistan Super League, 5th of 16
- Website: fcbunyodkor.com
Home colours	Away colours

Football Club Bunyodkor (Uzbek: Bunyodkor futbol klubi) is an Uzbek professional football club based in Tashkent that competes in the Uzbekistan Super League.

Bunyodkor, a relatively unknown club at the time, made international headlines when it claimed to be close to signing world-famous Barcelona striker Samuel Eto'o, although he did not eventually sign with them. On 25 August 2008, AEK Athens Brazilian superstar Rivaldo announced to the Greek press that he was joining Bunyodkor on a reported $14 million two-year contract.

The club finished second in the 2007 Uzbek League season and made the semi-finals of the 2008 AFC Champions League. In the beginning of August 2008, the club changed its name to Bunyodkor from PFC Kuruvchi to reflect the club's success on the pitch and its increasing professionalism off the pitch.

Bunyodkor competed in the AFC Champions League for 10 consecutive tournaments from 2008 to 2017. Only Pakhtakor has participated in more tournaments from the Uzbekistan Super League.

== History ==
The club's old logo as Kuruvchi

The club's logo in 2008–2013

Bunyodkor, which means "creator" in Uzbek (and originally from the Persian بنیادکار| bonyad-Kar), was created on 6 July 2005, with the name Neftgazmontaj-Quruvchi, which was typically abbreviated "Kuruvchi" (the Uzbek word for "builder"). In 2005, the club played initially in the championship of Tashkent region and played its way into the playoff for promotion into the First League, the second level of Uzbek football. Kuruvchi gained promotion that year, its first, and under the management of Khikmat Irgashev, Kuruvchi won the First League in its first attempt, winning 27 of 38 matches with 5 draws and 6 defeats.

With its victory in the second level of Uzbek football in 2006, the 2007 season was Kuruvchi's debut in the Uzbek League. Never before had a club moved with such alacrity from the lower reaches of Uzbek competition into the top league. In club's first season Bunyodkor finished runner-up after Pakhtakor Tashkent.

In December 2007 Mirjalol Kasymov was appointed as head coach of Bunyodkor, replacing Hikmat Irgashev.

2008 was debut year of Bunyodkor in AFC Champions League where they qualified to the semi-final of tournament. In semi-final they were beaten over two legs by Adelaide United 3–1 on aggregate.

=== Famous signings ===
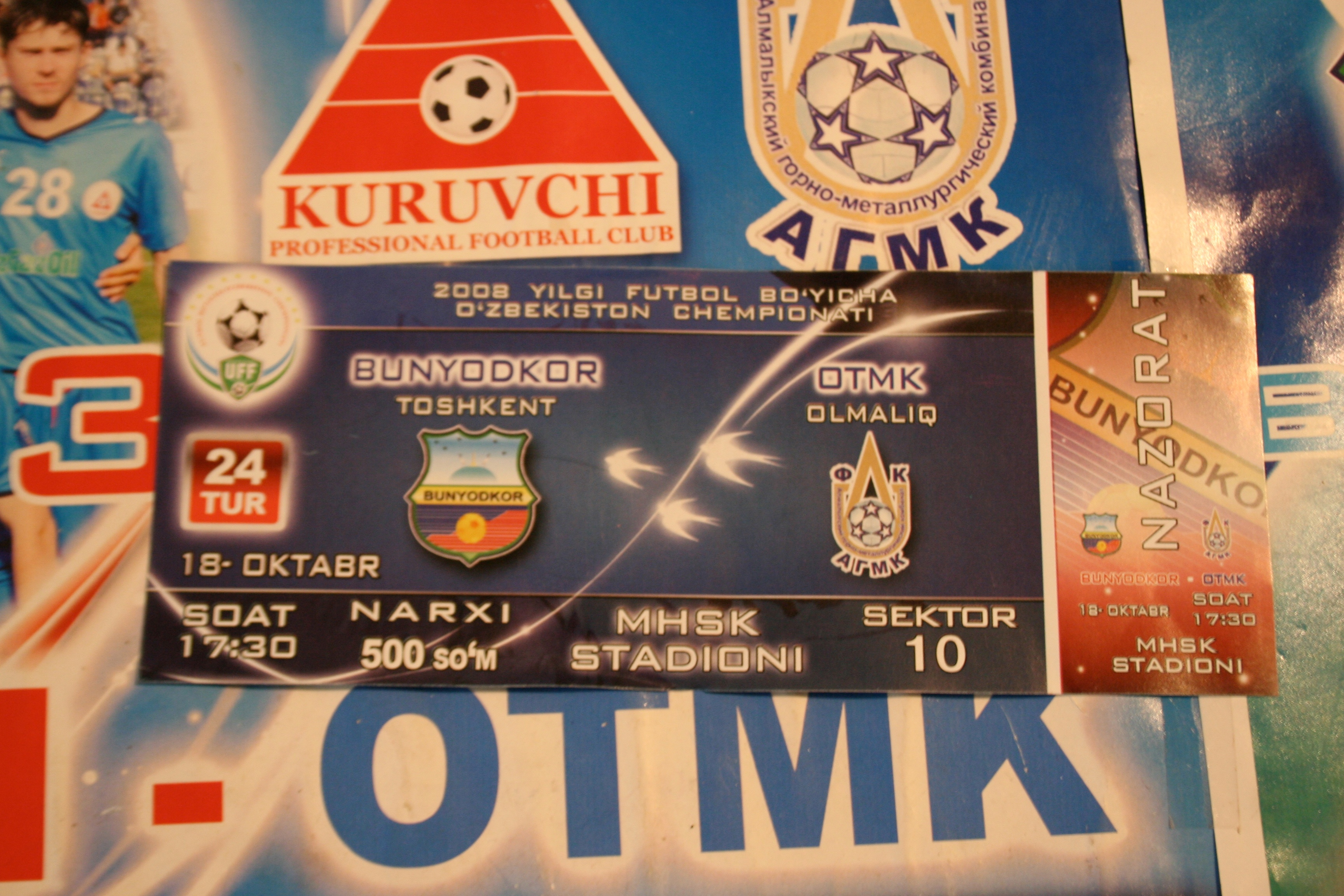
The ticket for Uzbek league match on 18 October 2008 against Olmaliq FK

On 14 July 2008, the club, then called Kuruvchi, announced through their official website that they had signed Barcelona star Samuel Eto'o on a six-month contract. The story was confirmed by Bakhtiyor Babaev, the club's sporting director, stating that it was a performance-related contract. He also went on to say that the Cameroonian football star would sign on 17 July, and that the transfer had taken place due to the good relationship enjoyed between both clubs' presidents. Despite this, Barcelona's official spokesperson denied any knowledge of the transfer, stating "I don't think it's very likely".

On 16 July 2008, the Uzbek radio Maxima reported that Davut Kivrak and Barcelona managers are expected to arrive in Tashkent to hold talks with the Uzbek Football Federation and to promote youth football (Barcelona and Bunyodkor have a yearly renewable deal to help in youth football). The following day, Eto'o confirmed that he was thinking of joining Kuruvchi – the team stated that they would have confirmation on whether Eto'o would join the team on 23 July 2008.

Shortly thereafter, Bunyodkor and Barcelona managements announced that the two clubs had reached an agreement to play a friendly in Tashkent and the Uzbek side will be able to train at Camp Nou.

As of 31 July 2008, Eto'o's status had become no clearer, as Bunyodkor was still in the running to obtain the services of the Cameroonian international, but he was also being sought by Milanese powerhouses A.C. Milan and Internazionale.

Just a couple of days after Eto'o's visit to Tashkent, two other players from Barcelona visited the team – Andrés Iniesta and Carles Puyol, as well as Arsenal midfielder Cesc Fàbregas.

Although unsuccessful in obtaining Eto'o's services by September 2008, Bunyodkor brought two famous Brazilians to Tashkent: Rivaldo as a midfielder and Zico as manager. Rivaldo signed a contract that he termed "very good for the end of my career" to play for Bunyodkor. Three weeks later, his countryman Zico signed on to manage the club on a one-year deal. Mirjalol Qosimov became adviser-coach to Brazilian Zico. On 17 November 2008 Rivaldo extended his contract with club until December 2011.

Zico left Bunyodkor in January 2009 after he was signed by PFC CSKA Moscow as head coach. On 8 June 2009 Luiz Felipe Scolari was announced as Bunyodkor's new head coach. In 2010 AFC Champions League, Bunyodkor failed to reach the quarter-final after losing on 12 May 2010 in Round of 16 to Al-Hilal FC 3–0. Scolari resigned from his post on 28 May 2010 and Mirjalol Qosimov was named as his successor. Qosimov became head coach of Bunyodkor again. Also Rivaldo unexpectedly terminated his multi-million contract and was released from the club on 12 August 2010.

=== 2011–present ===
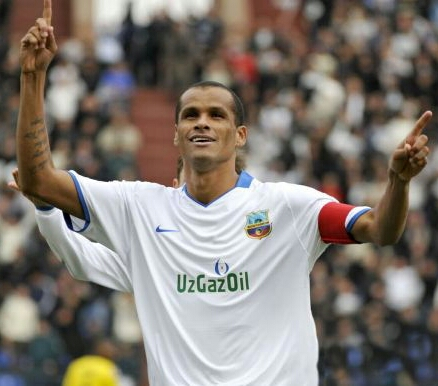
Rivaldo, played for Bunyodkor in 2008–2010

On 26 February 2011 Bunyodkor unveiled 11 new players for the 2011 season.

In the 2012 season, Bunyodkor was unable to defend its league title, despite winning its third Uzbek Cup; the club finished runner-up to Pakhtakor in the league. In the 2012 AFC Champions League, the club repeated its 2008 achievements, reaching the semi-final of the tournament. In the semi-final, Bunyodkor lost to Ulsan Hyundai over two legs.

Bunyodkor made play-off of AFC Champions League for the 6th successive season in 2013, winning the group stage of tournament. The club renewed its own previous record and record of AFC Champions League history. On 7 March 2014 Bunyodkor won Lokomotiv Tashkent with 2–1 in Uzbekistan Super Cup match, match between League champion and Uzbek Cup winner. The Super Cup was held for the second time since 1999.

On 6 June 2014, Sergey Lushan succeeded Mirjalol Kasymov to become the manager of Bunyodkor after Kasymov resigned his post at club in April 2014. During his time as head coach in club Lushan brought many talents from Bunyodkor academy to main squad. 2014 season club finished only 4th after Nasaf Qarshi. In 2015 AFC Champions League group stage Bunyodkor failed to qualify to play-off for the first time. After match Neftchi Farg'ona- Bunyodkor on 20 September 2015 he resigned his post on 23 September.

On 5 May 2017, Sergey Lushan was sacked, with Mirjalol Qosimov being appointed as the club's new manager the same day.

On 12 January 2019, Vadim Abramov was appointed as manager of Bunyodkor.

== Recent seasons ==
=== Domestic record ===
Champions	Runners-up	3rd Place, 4th Place or Losing semi-finalists

Season	League									Cup	Top goalscorer		Manager
Season	Div.	Pos.	Pl.	W	D	L	GS	GA	P	Cup	Name	League	Manager
2006	2nd	1st	38	27	5	6	94	32	86	Round of 16	Ravshan Teshaboev	21	(Uzbekistan) M.Umarkhojaev
2007	1st	2nd	30	22	5	3	62	16	71	Runner-up	(Uzbekistan) Ilkhom Muminjonov	16	(Uzbekistan) H.Irgashev
2008	1st	1st	30	25	4	1	75	13	79	Winner	(Uzbekistan) Server Djeparov	19	(Uzbekistan) Qosimov / (Brazil) Zico
2009	1st	1st	30	28	2	0	85	13	86	Runner up	(Brazil) Rivaldo	20	(Ukraine) A.Memet / (Uzbekistan) H.Irgashev / (Brazil) Scolari
2010	1st	1st	26	20	5	1	45	10	65	Winner	(North Macedonia) Stevica Ristić	11	(Brazil) Scolari / (Uzbekistan) Qosimov
2011	1st	1st	26	19	4	3	51	14	61	Semi-final	(Serbia) Miloš Trifunović	17	(Uzbekistan) Qosimov
2012	1st	2nd	26	17	6	3	42	16	57	Winner	(Uzbekistan) Anvarjon Soliev	7	(Uzbekistan) Qosimov
2013	1st	1st	26	19	4	3	59	13	61	Winner	(Ukraine) Oleksandr Pyschur	19	(Uzbekistan) Qosimov
2014	1st	4th	26	15	6	5	44	20	51	Runner-up	(Uzbekistan) Sardor Rashidov	10	(Uzbekistan) Qosimov / (Uzbekistan) A.Volkov / (Russia) S.Lushan
2015	1st	4th	30	18	5	7	44	19	59	Runner-up	(Uzbekistan) Dostonbek Khamdamov	10	(Russia) S.Lushan / (Uzbekistan) B.Babaev
2016	1st	2nd	30	18	9	3	46	13	63	Semi-final	(Uzbekistan) Eldor Shomurodov	10	(Uzbekistan) B.Babaev / (Russia) S.Lushan
2017	1st	4th	30	14	10	6	47	29	52	Runner-up	(Uzbekistan) Dostonbek Khamdamov	14	(Russia) S.Lushan / (Uzbekistan) M.Qosimov
2018	1st	4th	32	16	5	11	46	38	27	Semi-final	(Uzbekistan) Jovlon Ibrokhimov	11	(Uzbekistan) M.Qosimov
2019	1st	3rd	26	12	7	7	37	33	43	Semi-final	(Uzbekistan) Khursid Giyosov	12	(Uzbekistan) V.Abramov
2020	1st	4th	26	12	7	7	43	36	43	Round of 16	(Uzbekistan) Nurillo Tukhtasinov	11	(Uzbekistan) V.Abramov
2021	1st	5th	26	13	6	7	43	30	45	Semifinal	(Uzbekistan) Khursid Giyosov	9	(Uzbekistan) S.Maqsudov
2022	1st	8th	26	9	7	10	29	37	34	Round of 16	(Uzbekistan) Umarali Rahmonaliyev	7	(Uzbekistan) S.Maqsudov / (Uzbekistan) V.Karpenko / (Montenegro) I.Bošković
2023	1st	8th	26	10	7	9	30	33	37	Round of 16	(Uzbekistan) Jasur Hakimov	6	(Montenegro) I.Bošković / (Uzbekistan) M.Atadzhanov / (Russia) A.Krestinin
2024	1st	10th	26	7	9	10	27	38	30	Quarter-final	(Croatia) Andrija Filipović	5	(Croatia) I.Bubalo / (Uzbekistan) A.Gafurov / (Uzbekistan) S.Arslanov

== Records ==
=== Asian record ===
==== Overview ====
As of match played 2 December 2024

Competition	Pld	W	D	L	GF	GA
AFC Champions League	83	28	22	33	93	106
Total	83	28	22	33	93	106

Season	Competition	Round	Club	Home	Away
2008	AFC CL	Group	(Saudi Arabia) Al-Ittihad	2–0	0–1
2008	AFC CL	Group	(Iran) Sepahan	2–0	1–1
2008	AFC CL	Group	(Syria) Al Ittihad	1–0	2–0
2008	AFC CL	Quarter-final	(Iran) Saipa	5–1	2–2
2008	AFC CL	Semi-final	(Australia) Adelaide United	1–0	0–3
2009	AFC CL	Group	(Saudi Arabia) Al-Ettifaq	2–1	0–4
2009	AFC CL	Group	(United Arab Emirates) Al Shabab	0–0	0–2
2009	AFC CL	Group	(Iran) Sepahan	2–2	1–0
2009	AFC CL	Round of 16	(Iran) Persepolis	not held	1–0
2009	AFC CL	Quarter-final	(South Korea) Pohang Steelers	3–1	1–4(aet)
2010	AFC CL	Group	(Saudi Arabia) Al-Ittihad	3–0	1–1
2010	AFC CL	Group	(United Arab Emirates) Al Wahda	4–1	2–1
2010	AFC CL	Group	(Iran) Zob Ahan Isfahan	0–1	0–3
2010	AFC CL	Round of 16	(Saudi Arabia) Al-Hilal	not held	0–3
2011	AFC CL	Group	(United Arab Emirates) Al Wahda	3–2	1–1
2011	AFC CL	Group	(Saudi Arabia) Al-Ittihad	0–1	1–1
2011	AFC CL	Group	(Iran) Persepolis	0–0	3–2
2011	AFC CL	Round of 16	(Iran) Sepahan	not held	1–3
2012	AFC CL	Group	(Japan) Gamba Osaka	3–2	1–3
2012	AFC CL	Group	(Australia) Adelaide United	1–2	0–0
2012	AFC CL	Group	(South Korea) Pohang Steelers	1–0	2–0
2012	AFC CL	Round of 16	(South Korea) Seongnam	not held	1–0
2012	AFC CL	Quarter-final	(Australia) Adelaide United	3–2 (aet)	2–2
2012	AFC CL	Semi-final	(South Korea) Ulsan Hyundai	1–3	0–2
2013	AFC CL	Group	(South Korea) Pohang Steelers	2–2	1–1
2013	AFC CL	Group	(Japan) Sanfrecce Hiroshima	0–0	2–0
2013	AFC CL	Group	(China) Beijing Guoan	0–0	1–0
2013	AFC CL	Round of 16	(Thailand) Buriram United	0–0	1–2
2014	AFC CL	Group	(Iran) Foolad	1–1	0–1
2014	AFC CL	Group	(Qatar) El Jaish	1–2	2–1
2014	AFC CL	Group	(Saudi Arabia) Al-Fateh	3–2	0–0
2014	AFC CL	Round of 16	(Saudi Arabia) Al-Hilal	0–1	0–3
2015	AFC CL	Play-off round	(United Arab Emirates) Al Jazira	2–1	not held
2015	AFC CL	Group	(Iran) Persepolis	0–1	1–2
2015	AFC CL	Group	(Qatar) Lekhwiya	0–1	0–1
2015	AFC CL	Group	(Saudi Arabia) Al-Nassr	0–1	1–1
2016	AFC CL	Play-off round	(United Arab Emirates) Al Shabab	2–0	not held
2016	AFC CL	Group	(Iran) Zob Ahan	0–0	2–5
2016	AFC CL	Group	(Qatar) Lekhwiya	0–2	0–0
2016	AFC CL	Group	(Saudi Arabia) Al-Nassr	0–1	3–3
2017	AFC CL	Play-off round	(Qatar) El Jaish	not held	0–0(p)
2017	AFC CL	Group	(Iran) Zob Ahan	0–2	1–2
2017	AFC CL	Group	(Saudi Arabia) Al-Ahli	2–0	0–2
2017	AFC CL	Group	(United Arab Emirates) Al Ain	2–3	0–2
2020	AFC CL	Preliminary round 2	(Iraq) Al-Zawraa	4–1	not held
2020	AFC CL	Play-off round	(United Arab Emirates) Al Ain	not held	0–1

==== AFC ranking ====
As of 27 January 2025.

Rank	Team
104	(Qatar) Al-Arabi
105	(Japan) Kashiwa Reysol
106	(Indonesia) PSM Makassar
107	(Uzbekistan) Bunyodkor
108	(Iran) Saba Qom
109	(Japan) Kyoto Sanga
110	(Iran) Malavan

== Stadium ==
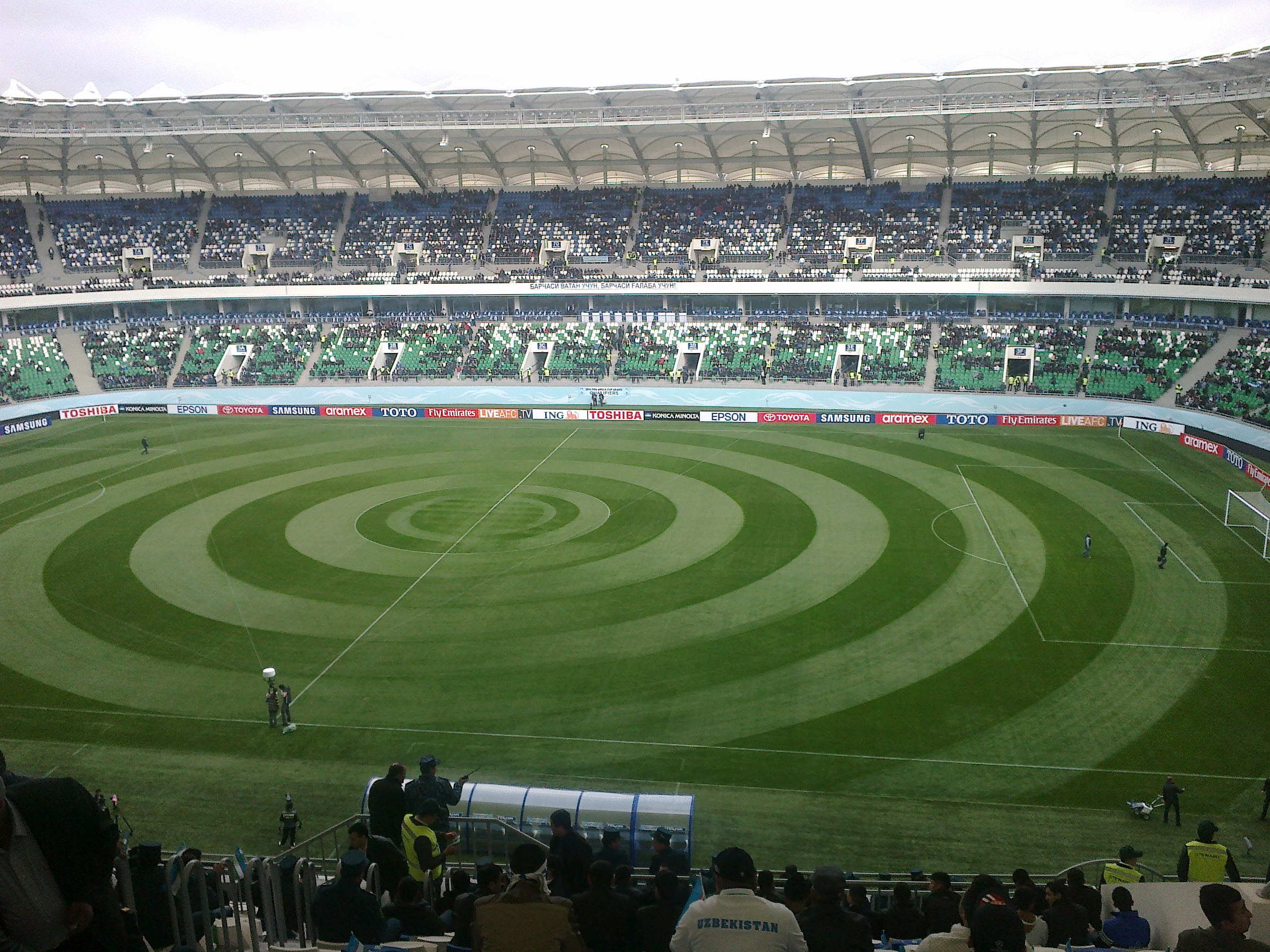
Bunyodkor Stadium, 26 March 2013

Bunyodkor played its first years at the MHSK Stadium. After the end of the Uzbek League season 2008 it was announced that MHSK stadium would have been closed for longtime reconstruction. Season 2008 was the last season at the MHSK stadium, for 2009 season club moved to 8,460-seater JAR Stadium. The old MHSK Stadium was completely demolished, with plans to build a new 34,000 all-seater Milliy Stadium and football academy. The construction works were finished in August 2012.

The stadium was opened on 28 September 2012 and originally was one of the proposed venues to host the matches of FIFA U-20 Women's World Cup 2012 in Uzbekistan. The festive opening ceremony of the stadium marking the 100th anniversary of football in Uzbekistan was held on 28 September 2012 with an exhibition match between Bunyodkor and Pakhtakor with the scoreline ending 3:3.

The first official football match was played on 26 March 2013. The 2014 FIFA World Cup AFC qualifying round 4 match between Uzbekistan and Lebanon ended with a 1–0.

== Records and statistics ==
Anvar Gafurov presently holds the team record for number of matches played for the club. He made 232 appearances ahead of Hayrulla Karimov with 224 caps (4 December 2017)

Bunyodkor's all-time top goalscorers in all competitions is Anvar Soliev with 65 goals, 46 of them in league matches, 2nd is Rivaldo with 43 goals followed by Viktor Karpenko with 39 goals.

=== Top goalscorers ===
As of Match played 27 November 2021

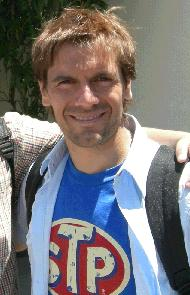
José Luis Villanueva scored 28 goals during his two seasons at Bunyodkor.

	Name	Years	League	Uzbek Cup	League Cup	Super Cup	AFC	Total
1	(Uzbekistan) Anvarjon Soliev	2008–2013	46 (100)	11 (17+)	(-)	(-)	8 (35)	65 (152+)
2	(Uzbekistan) Dostonbek Khamdamov	2014–2018	37 (93)	9 (21)	(-)	0 (0)	3 (20)	49 (134)
3	(Brazil) Rivaldo	2008–2010	33 (53)	5 (10+)	(-)	(-)	5 (18)	43 (81+)
4	(Uzbekistan) Victor Karpenko	2007–2012, 2015–2016	32 (148)	3 (31+)	(-)	(-)	3 (38)	38 (217+)
4	(Uzbekistan) Server Djeparov	2007–2010	33 (65)	2 (10+)	(-)	(-)	3 (26)	38 (101+)
6	(Uzbekistan) Khursid Giyosov	2014–2019, 2020–Present	34 (103)	2 (13)	1 (1)	(-)	0 (4)	37 (121)
7	(Ukraine) Oleksandr Pyschur	2013–2014	25 (44)	5 (8)	(-)	1 (1)	4 (16)	35 (69)
8	(Uzbekistan) Shavkat Salomov	2007–2012	20 (104)	8 (22+)	(-)	(-)	2 (28)	30 (154)
9	(Chile) José Luis Villanueva	2008–2009	19 (35)	5 (5+)	(-)	(-)	4 (4)	28 (44+)
10	(Uzbekistan) Vokhid Shodiev	2014–2015, 2017	17 (52)	4 (13)	(-)	1 (1)	3 (13)	25 (79)

== Kit manufacturers and shirt sponsors ==
The current main shirt sponsor of Bunyodkor is the state natural gas transport company "Uztransgaz". Uztransgaz became largest shareholder of Bunyodkor in March 2011 and head club sponsor. Bunyodkors shirts had been made by manufacturer Nike until 2012. In March 2012 club announced Jako as the club's new kit manufacturer, extending the deal in December 2017.

Period	Kit manufacturer	Sponsor
2005–2006	Nike	Neftgazmontaj
2006–2011	Nike	UzGazOil
2011–	Nike	Uztransgaz
2012–2018	Jako	Uztransgaz
2019–now	Nike	Uztransgaz

== Capital derby ==
Since Bunyodkor's promotion to the Uzbek League matches between club and their other rival from capital, football powerhouse Pakhtakor, considered by supporters of both sides and football journalists as Uzbek capital derby or Toshkent derby. With former coach Luiz Felipe Scolari Bunyodkor faced four derby matches: three Uzbek League and one Uzbekistan Cup matches. His first derby match took place on 12 July 2009 at JAR Stadium where Bunyodkor won against Pakhtakor with 2:1. The Supercup match between the champion and the Cup winner originally scheduled for 11 March 2012 was postponed. The new date for the game was officially not announced.

On 26 June 2012, in League match Bunyodkor won Pakhtakor for the second time with two goal difference (2:0). In semi-final 2nd leg match of Uzbekistan Cup on 25 November 2012, Bunyodkor won Pakhtakor with 3:1 for the second time, qualifying to cup final. On 30 June 2013 Bunyodkor played away League match won with 2:0. This defeat was Pakhtakor's first home match loss in Uzbek League against Bunyodkor.

In the second leg of 2013 League season on 8 August 2013 Bunyodkor faced Pakhtakor at home JAR ground and lost against the Lions with 1:2. The loss was Bunyodkor's first since 2009 Cup match and first ever in League matches.

Season	Date	Home team	Away team	Score	Competition	Home goal scorers	Away goal scorers
2007	18 May 2007	Quruvchi	Pakhtakor	1–1	League	Lushan 39' pen	Magdeev 85'
2007	22 September 2007	Pakhtakor	Quruvchi	0–0	League	-	-
2007	9 December 2007	Pakhtakor	Quruvchi	0–0 (7:6)	Cup	-	-
2008	10 July 2008	Pakhtakor	Quruvchi	1–1	League	Geynrikh 57'	Villanueva 31'
2008	16 August 2008	Bunyodkor	Pakhtakor	1–1	League	Villanueva 8'	Z.Tadjiyev 90+2'
2008	31 October 2008	Bunyodkor	Pakhtakor	3–1	Cup	J.Hasanov 40', Soliev 101', 114'	Ahmedov 45'
2009	12 July 2009	Bunyodkor	Pakhtakor	2–1	League	Aliqulov 21' (o.g.), J.Hasanov 58'	Geynrikh 71'
2009	14 October 2009	Pakhtakor	Bunyodkor	0–0	League	-	–
2009	8 August 2009	Pakhtakor	Bunyodkor	1–0	Cup	Andreev 35'	–
2010	14 March 2010	Bunyodkor	Pakhtakor	2–1	League	Rivaldo 18', Ristic 69'	Miladinovic 78'
2010	31 October 2010	Pakhtakor	Bunyodkor	0–0	League	-	–
2011	7 July 2011	Pakhtakor	Bunyodkor	0–0	League	-	-
2011	21 August 2011	Bunyodkor	Pakhtakor	2–1	League	Karpenko 70', Trifunović 72'	A.Azizov 88'
2012	11 March 2012	Bunyodkor	Pakhtakor	–	Supercup ^{1}	-	-
2012	26 June 2012	Bunyodkor	Pakhtakor	2–0	League	Salomov 52', Kozák 64'	-
2012	9 August 2012	Pakhtakor	Bunyodkor	1–1	League	Andreev 70' pen	Salomov 15'
2012	22 August 2012	Bunyodkor	Pakhtakor	1–1	Cup	Soliev 42'	Andreev 21' pen
2012	25 November 2012	Pakhtakor	Bunyodkor	1–3	Cup	Abdukholiqov 73'	Shorahmedov 53', Salomov 54',78'
2013	30 June 2013	Pakhtakor	Bunyodkor	0–2	League	-	Miladinović 67' (o.g.), Pyschur 75'
2013	8 August 2013	Bunyodkor	Pakhtakor	1–2	League	Turaev 90'	Makharadze 4', Abdukholiqov 83'
2014	5 July 2014	Pakhtakor	Bunyodkor	3–1	League	Sergeev 45+1', 46', Makharadze 53'	Shodiev 84'
2014	7 November 2014	Bunyodkor	Pakhtakor	2–3	League	Rashidov 38',47'	Sergeev 79', 90', Iskanderov 89'
2015	31 May 2015	Pakhtakor	Bunyodkor	1–0	League	Sergeev 69'	
2015	12 August 2015	Pakhtakor	Bunyodkor	2–3	Cup	A.Orahovac 24', Makharadze 68'	Khamdamov 3', Urinboev 35', A.Komilov 75'
2015	15 September 2015	Bunyodkor	Pakhtakor	1–0	Cup	Shomurodov 25'	
2015	24 October 2015	Bunyodkor	Pakhtakor	2–0	League	Shorakhmedov 49', Khamdamov 75'	
2016	29 April 2016	Bunyodkor	Pakhtakor	3–0	League	Khamdamov 56', Urinboev 57', Shomurodov 88'	
2016	17 September 2016	Pakhtakor	Bunyodkor	2–1	League	Masharipov 84', Iskanderov 85'	Nurmatov 75'
2017	17 May 2017	Bunyodkor	Pakhtakor	1–1	League	Khamdamov 11'	Andreev 71'
2017	26 October 2017	Pakhtakor	Bunyodkor	1–0	League	K. Tajiev 84'	
2018	10 March 2018	Bunyodkor	Pakhtakor	1–0	League	R.Ashurmatov 79'	
2018	25 May 2018	Pakhtakor	Bunyodkor	1–0	League	Tiago Bezerra 6'	
2018	24 October 2018	Bunyodkor	Pakhtakor	0–2	League		Tiago Bezerra 22' 36'
2018	30 November 2018	Pakhtakor	Bunyodkor	4–0	League	Tiago Bezerra 5' 44' 83', Sergeev 90+1'	
2019	31 March 2019	Bunyodkor	Pakhtakor	1–2	League	S.Kodirkulov 4'	Khamdamov 17' Ćeran 63'
2019	27 November 2019	Pakhtakor	Bunyodkor	2–3	League	Sergeev 39', 67'	N.Tukhtasinov 11'; J.Kakhramanov 25'; Giyosov 90'
2020	19 June 2020	Pakhtakor	Bunyodkor	5–0	League		
2020	20 August 2020	Pakhtakor	Bunyodkor	1–0	Cup		
2020	5 November 2020	Bunyodkor	Pakhtakor	3–2	League		
2021	31 July 2021	Pakhtakor	Bunyodkor	1–0	League		
2021	24 November 2021	Pakhtakor	Bunyodkor	1–1 (5:4)	Cup		
2021	27 November 2020	Bunyodkor	Pakhtakor	3–2	League		
2022	29 June 2022	Pakhtakor	Bunyodkor	2–3	League		
2022	12 November 2022	Bunyodkor	Pakhtakor	0–2	League		

=== Match statistics ===
Statistics as of 8 December 2022

	Matches	Bunyodkor wins	Draws	Pakhtakor wins	Bunyodkor goals	Pakhtakor goals
Uzbek League	34	12	9	13	39	43
Uzbek Cup	9	4	1	4	11	8
Total matches	43	16	10	17	50	51

=== Derby all-time top scorers ===
As of 27 November 2019

#	Scorer	Club	Goals
1	(Brazil) Tiago Bezerra	Pakhtakor	6
1	(Uzbekistan) Igor Sergeev	Pakhtakor	6
2	(Uzbekistan) Dostonbek Khamdamov	Bunyodkor Pakhtakor	5
3	(Uzbekistan) Shavkat Salomov	Bunyodkor	4
3	(Uzbekistan) Stanislav Andreev	Pakhtakor	4
4	(Uzbekistan) Anvar Soliev	Bunyodkor	3
4	(Georgia (country)) Kakhi Makharadze	Pakhtakor	3

== Players ==
=== Current squad ===
As of 29 July, 2026

Note: Flags indicate national team as defined under FIFA eligibility rules; some limited exceptions apply. Players may hold more than one non-FIFA nationality.

No.	Pos.	Nation	Player
1	GK	UZB	Abdumavlon Abduzhalilov
3	DF	UZB	Sardor Rakhmanov
4	DF	UZB	Nazhmiddin Normurodov
5	DF	UZB	Aleksandr Zevadinov
6	DF	UZB	Boburbek Yuldoshev
8	MF	RUS	Dmitry Pletnyov
9	FW	MNE	Matija Krivokapić
10	MF	UZB	Amir Turakulov
11	MF	UZB	Sardor Abdunabiev
13	DF	UZB	Mukhammad Khakimov
14	MF	UZB	Shakhzod Nematzhonov
16	GK	ITA	Federico Botti

No.	Pos.	Nation	Player
17	MF	UZB	Muzaffar Olimzhonov
18	MF	UZB	Narimonjon Ahmadjonov
20	MF	UZB	Abulfayz Bobomurodov
21	MF	UZB	Nosirzhon Abdusalomov
22	GK	UZB	Mukhammadyusuf Sobirov
27	DF	UZB	Islom Anvarov
28	FW	UZB	Samandarzhon Mavlonkulov
39	MF	UZB	Fahriddin Muhammadov
45	MF	UZB	Shamsiddin Tursunmakhamadov
66	MF	UZB	Azizbek Tulkinbekov
77	FW	UZB	Bilolkhon Toshmirzaev

=== Out on loan ===
Note: Flags indicate national team as defined under FIFA eligibility rules; some limited exceptions apply. Players may hold more than one non-FIFA nationality.

No.	Pos.	Nation	Player

== Notable players ==
Had international caps for their respective countries. Players whose name is listed in bold represented their countries while playing for Bunyodkor.

=== Former players ===
Uzbekistan

- (Uzbekistan) **Server Djeparov**
- (Uzbekistan) **Jovlon Ibrokhimov**
- (Uzbekistan) **Akmal Shorakhmedov**
- (Uzbekistan) **Hayrulla Karimov**
- (Uzbekistan) **Sardor Rashidov**
- (Uzbekistan) **Artyom Filiposyan**
- (Uzbekistan) **Jasur Hasanov**
- (Uzbekistan) **Anvar Gafurov**
- (Uzbekistan) **Timur Kapadze**
- (Uzbekistan) **Ignatiy Nesterov**
- (Uzbekistan) **Kamoliddin Murzoev**
- (Uzbekistan) **Pavel Bugalo**
- (Uzbekistan) **Anzur Ismailov**
- (Uzbekistan) **Pavel Bugalo**
- (Uzbekistan) **Anvarjon Soliev**
- (Uzbekistan) **Yannis Mandzukas**
- (Uzbekistan) **Victor Karpenko**
- (Uzbekistan) **Azizbek Haydarov**
- (Uzbekistan) **Temurkhuja Abdukholiqov**
- (Uzbekistan) **Abdukodir Khusanov**

Former USSR countries

- (Belarus) Aleksey Nosko
- (Belarus) Viktar Sotnikaw
- (Georgia (country)) Nikoloz Mali
- (Kyrgyzstan) **Odilzhon Abdurakhmanov**
- (Kyrgyzstan) **Emil Kenzhesariev**
- (Moldova) **Vadim Cemirtan**
- (Russia) **Pavel Mogilevets**
- (Tajikistan) **Davron Ergashev**
- (Turkmenistan) Selim Nurmyradow
- (Turkmenistan) **Goçguly Goçgulyýew**
- (Ukraine) Oleksandr Pyschur

Europe

- (Albania) Luis Kaçorri
- (Bosnia and Herzegovina) **Samir Bekrić**
- (Bosnia and Herzegovina) Samir Zeljković
- (Croatia) **Jurica Buljat**
- (Croatia) Marin Ljubić
- (Croatia) Toni Jović
- (Croatia) Andrija Filipović
- (Croatia) Frane Čirjak
- (Montenegro) Momčilo Rašo
- (Montenegro) Igor Ivanović
- (Spain) Carles Coto
- (North Macedonia) **Stevica Ristić**
- (Serbia) Dimitrije Pobulić
- (Serbia) Filip Rajevac
- (Serbia) Dušan Mićić
- (Serbia) Marko Blažić
- (Serbia) Ivan Milošević
- (Serbia) Aleksandar Alempijević
- (Serbia) **Miloš Trifunović**
- (Serbia) **Uroš Milosavljević**
- (Serbia) Slavoljub Đorđević
- (Serbia) Milan Marčić
- (Serbia) Saša Đorđević
- (Slovakia) **Jan Kozak**

South America

- (Brazil) Rivaldo
- (Brazil) Denilson
- (Brazil) Edson Ramos Silva
- (Brazil) Joao Victor
- (Brazil) Leomar Rodrigues
- (Brazil) Luizão
- (Brazil) Wellington Taira
- (Chile) **José Luis Villanueva**

Africa

- (Ghana) Francis Narh
- (Nigeria) Patrick Agbo
- (Nigeria) David Oniya
- (Nigeria) Ibrahim Tomiwa
- (Tunisia) **Chaker Zouaghi**

Asia

- (Australia) **David Carney**
- (Japan) Sato Minori
- (Japan) Itsuki Urata

== Current technical staff ==
Position	Name
Head coach	(Bosnia and Herzegovina) Ivan Bubalo
Assistant coach	(Bosnia and Herzegovina) Dalibor Šilić
Assistant coach	(Uzbekistan) Alexander Gennadievich Volkov
Assistant coach	(Uzbekistan) Hikmat Irgashev
Fitness coach	(Romania) Augustin Chiriță
Goalkeeping coach	(Serbia) Srđan Soldatović
Coach	(Uzbekistan) Khairullo Karimov
Coach	(Uzbekistan) Victor Karpenko

== Managerial history ==
As of match played 1 January 2025. Only competitive matches are counted.

Name	From	To	P	W	D	L	GS	GA	%W	Honours
(Uzbekistan) Mavzurkhoja Umarkhojaev	2005	2006	0	0	0	0	0	0	—	Tashkent Region Championship (1); Uzbekistan Second League (1); Uzbekistan First League (1)
(Uzbekistan) Hikmat Irgashev	2007	2007	38	28	7	3	76	18	73.68	
(Uzbekistan) Mirjalol Qosimov	4 December 2007	24 September 2008	34	28	5	1	86	13	82.35	
(Brazil) Zico	26 September 2008	8 January 2009	13	10	1	2	24	10	76.92	Uzbek League (1); Uzbekistan Cup (1)
(Ukraine) Amet Memet (interim)	8 January 2009	15 March 2009	3	3	0	0	7	1	100.00	
(Uzbekistan) Hikmat Irgashev	15 March 2009	8 June 2009	15	11	2	2	26	11	73.33	
(Brazil) Luiz Felipe Scolari	8 June 2009	28 May 2010	44	33	5	6	99	32	75.00	Uzbek League (1)
(Uzbekistan) Mirjalol Qosimov	28 May 2010	4 April 2014	155	99	36	20	281	102	63.87	Uzbek League (3); Uzbekistan Cup (3); Uzbekistan Super Cup (1)
(Uzbekistan) Alexander Volkov (interim)	4 April 2014	6 June 2014	12	6	3	3	17	12	50.00	
(Uzbekistan) Sergey Lushan	6 June 2014	22 September 2015	27	12	5	10	39	25	44.44	
(Uzbekistan) Bahtiyor Babaev (interim)	23 September 2015	1 February 2016	9	4	3	2	18	7	44.44	
(Uzbekistan) Sergey Lushan	1 February 2016	5 May 2017	51	24	15	12	80	47	47.06	
(Uzbekistan) Mirjalol Qosimov	5 May 2017	31 December 2019	30	17	7	6	49	27	56.67	
(Uzbekistan) Vadim Abramov	1 January 2019	31 December 2020	62	29	14	19	99	85	46.77	
(Uzbekistan) Shukhrat Maqsudov	1 March 2021	11 May 2022	42	20	11	11	81	54	47.62	
(Uzbekistan) Viktor Karpenko	11 May 2022	9 September 2022	12	3	3	6	17	23	25.00	
(Montenegro) Ivan Bošković	10 September 2022	10 February 2023	8	4	2	2	9	8	50.00	
(Uzbekistan) Murad Atadzhanov	10 February 2023	6 July 2023	16	5	6	5	15	16	31.25	
(Russia) Aleksandr Krestinin	7 July 2023	2 December 2023	14	6	3	5	18	20	42.86	
(Croatia) Ivan Bubalo	4 January 2024	16 March 2024	2	0	0	2	2	8	0.00	
(Uzbekistan) Anvar Gafurov (interim)	16 March 2024	21 June 2024	13	2	7	4	14	16	15.38	
(Uzbekistan) Sergey Arslanov	22 June 2024	31 December 2024	16	7	4	5	21	17	43.75	
(Uzbekistan) Ilyos Zeytulayev	1 January 2025		0	0	0	0	0	0	—	

- Notes:

P – Total of played matches W – Won matches D – Drawn matches L – Lost matches GS – Goal scored GA – Goals against
%W – Percentage of matches won

Nationality is indicated by the corresponding FIFA country code(s).

== Honours ==
=== Uzbekistan ===
- Uzbekistan Super League:
  - Winners (5): 2008, 2009, 2010, 2011, 2013
  - Runners-up (3): 2007, 2012, 2016
- Uzbekistan Cup:
  - Winners (4): 2008, 2010, 2012, 2013
  - Runners-up (5): 2007, 2009, 2014, 2015, 2017
- Uzbekistan Super Cup:
  - Winners (1): 2014
- Uzbekistan First League:
  - Winners (1): 2006
- Uzbekistan Second League:
  - Winners (1): 2005
- Tashkent Region Championship:
  - Winners (1): 2005

=== International ===
- Matchworld Cup:
  - Third place (1): 2012
- AFC Champions League:
  - Semi-final (2): 2008, 2012
