= Andrei Pletnyov =

Russian footballer and referee

Personal information
- Full name: Andrei Vladimirovich Pletnyov
- Date of birth: 14 March 1971 (age 55)
- Place of birth: Leningrad, Russian SFSR
- Height: 1.75 m (5 ft 9 in)
- Position: Midfielder

Youth career
- Zvezda Leningrad
- ShISP-62 Leningrad

Senior career*
Years	Team	Apps	(Gls)
1989	Dynamo Leningrad	33	(2)
1990–1991	Kirovets Saint Petersburg	52	(8)
1992	Lokomotiv Saint Petersburg	31	(2)
1993–1994	Lada Togliatti	38	(0)
1994–1995	Zorya-MALS Luhansk	7	(4)
1995	Zenit Saint Petersburg	28	(0)
1996–1997	Gazovik-Gazprom Izhevsk	58	(3)
1998	Uralmash Yekaterinburg	30	(10)
1999	Lada-Simbirsk Dimitrovgrad	40	(3)
2000–2001	Dynamo Saint Petersburg	51	(17)
2002	Torpedo-MAZ Minsk	13	(4)
2002–2003	Petrotrest Saint Petersburg	22	(4)
2003	Svetogorets	22	(3)
2004	Petrotrest Saint Petersburg	20	(1)
- * Club domestic league appearances and goals

Andrei Vladimirovich Pletnyov (Russian: Андрей Владимирович Плетнёв; born 15 March 1971) is a former Russian football player and referee.

He worked as an assistant referee in the Russian Second Division in 2006.

His son Dmitry Pletnyov is also a football player.
