= Odilzhon Abdurakhmanov =

Kyrgyzstani footballer

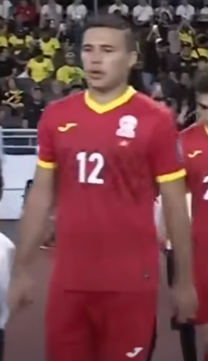

Personal information
- Full name: Odilzhon Alisherovich Abdurakhmanov
- Date of birth: 18 March 1996 (age 30)
- Place of birth: Kyzyl-Kyya, Kyrgyzstan
- Height: 1.74 m (5 ft 9 in)
- Position: Midfielder

Team information
- Current team: Thanh Hoa
- Number: 77

Senior career*
Years	Team	Apps	(Gls)
2014	Aldiyer Kurshab		
2015–2021	Alay Osh		
2021–2022	Bunyodkor	29	(1)
2022–2023	Maktaaral	25	(2)
2024	Neftchi Kochkor-Ata		
2024–2025	Becamex Binh Duong	22	(2)
2025–	Thanh Hoa	32	(1)

International career^{‡}
2016–	Kyrgyzstan	54	(4)
- * Club domestic league appearances and goals as of 20 November 2026 ‡ National team caps and goals as of 4 October 2026

Odilzhon Alisherovich Abdurakhmanov (Kyrgyz: Одилжон Абдурахманов; Russian: Одилжон Алишерович Абдурахманов; born 18 March 1996) is a Kyrgyzstani professional footballer who plays as a midfielder for V.League 1 club Thanh Hoa and the Kyrgyzstan national team.

== Club career ==
On 19 February 2021, Uzbekistan Super League club Bunyodkor announced the signing of Abdurakhmanov.

On 6 September 2024, Abdurakhmanov moved to Vietnam, signing for V.League 1 club Becamex Binh Duong.

In August 2025, Abdurakhmanov moved to fellow-V.League 1 club Thanh Hoa. He was named team captain for the 2026–27 season.

== Career statistics ==
=== Club ===
As of match played 27 November 2021

Appearances and goals by club, season and competition
Club	Season	League			National Cup		League Cup		Continental		Other		Total	
Club	Season	Division	Apps	Goals	Apps	Goals	Apps	Goals	Apps	Goals	Apps	Goals	Apps	Goals
Alay Osh	2016	Kyrgyz Premier League					—		1	0	—		1	0
Alay Osh	2017	Kyrgyz Premier League					—		6	1	—		6	1
Alay Osh	2018	Kyrgyz Premier League					—		6	0	—		6	0
Alay Osh	2019	Kyrgyz Premier League					—		2	0	—		2	0
Alay Osh	2020	Kyrgyz Premier League					—		—		—			
Alay Osh	Total						-	-	15	1	-	-	15	1
Bunyodkor	2021	Uzbekistan Super League	20	1	5	0	—		—		—		25	1
Bunyodkor	2022	Uzbekistan Super League	9	0	2	0	—		—		—		11	0
Bunyodkor	Total		29	1	7	0	-	-	-	-	-	-	36	1
Career total			29	1	9	0	-	-	15	1	-	-	51	2

=== International ===
As of match played 4 October 2026

Appearances and goals by national team and year
National team	Year	Apps	Goals
Kyrgyzstan	2016	4	0
Kyrgyzstan	2017	0	0
Kyrgyzstan	2018	4	0
Kyrgyzstan	2019	5	0
Kyrgyzstan	2020	0	0
Kyrgyzstan	2021	6	1
Kyrgyzstan	2022	6	0
Kyrgyzstan	2023	8	1
Kyrgyzstan	2024	12	1
Kyrgyzstan	2025	5	0
Kyrgyzstan	2026	4	1
Total		54	4

Scores and results list Kyrgyzstan's goal tally first, score column indicates score after each Abdurakhmanov goal.

List of international goals scored by Odilzhon Abdurakhmanov
No.	Date	Venue	Opponent	Score	Result	Competition
1	16 November 2021	Bahrain National Stadium, Riffa, Bahrain	Bahrain	2–1	2–4	Friendly
2	21 November 2023	Dolen Omurzakov Stadium, Bishkek, Kyrgyzstan	Oman	1–0	1–0	2026 FIFA World Cup qualification
3	10 September 2024	Dolen Omurzakov Stadium, Bishkek, Kyrgyzstan	Uzbekistan	2–1	2–3	2026 FIFA World Cup qualification
4	4 October 2026	Dolen Omurzakov Stadium, Bishkek, Kyrgyzstan	Lebanon	1–0	3–1	Friendly
