= 2007 FC Bunyodkor season =

FC Bunyodkor
2007 season
- Manager: Hikmat Irgashev
- Uzbek League: 2nd
- Uzbek Cup: Runner-up
- Top goalscorer: League: Ilkhom Muminjonov (16); All: Ilkhom Muminjonov (16)
- Highest home attendance: 12,000 vs Pakhtakor Tashkent (18 May 2007)
- Lowest home attendance: 1,000 vs Vobkent (6 December 2007)
- Average home league attendance: 4,911
Home colours	Away colours

The 2007 season was Bunyodkor's first season in the Uzbek League in Uzbekistan. Bunyodkor competed in the Uzbek League, and was runner up for the Uzbek Cup.

== Squad ==
As of match played 9 December 2007

No.	Name	Nationality	Position	Date of birth (age)	Signed from	Signed in	Contract ends	Apps.	Goals
Goalkeepers
	Oleg Belyakov	(Uzbekistan)	GK	1 February 1972 (aged 35)	Navbahor Namangan	2007		10	0
	Pavel Bugalo	(Uzbekistan)	GK	21 August 1974 (aged 33)	Ordabasy	2007		30	0
	Mukhiddin Khudoyorov	(Uzbekistan)	GK	5 November 1990 (aged 17)	Youth Team	2007		0	0
Defenders
	Goçguly Goçgulyýew	(Turkmenistan)	DF	26 May 1977 (aged 30)	Kairat	2007		16	5
	Bakhtiyor Ashurmatov	(Uzbekistan)	DF	25 March 1976 (aged 31)	Krylia Sovetov	2007		33	0
	Sakhob Juraev	(Uzbekistan)	DF	19 January 1987 (aged 20)	Lokomotiv Tashkent	2007		9	0
	Abduqahhor Hojiakbarov	(Uzbekistan)	DF	18 July 1989 (aged 18)	Youth Team	2007		1	0
	Aleksandr Khvostunov	(Uzbekistan)	DF	9 January 1974 (aged 33)	Navbahor Namangan	2007		37	1
	Abdumajid Toirov	(Uzbekistan)	DF	5 August 1974 (aged 33)	Topalang Sariosiyo	2007		28	1
Midfielders
	Witaliý Alikperow	(Turkmenistan)	MF	1 August 1978 (aged 29)	Nasaf Qarshi	2007		15	0
	Rashidjon Gafurov	(Uzbekistan)	MF	26 September 1977 (aged 30)	Mash'al Mubarek	2007		35	6
	Jasur Hasanov	(Uzbekistan)	MF	2 August 1983 (aged 24)	Mash'al Mubarek	2007		36	2
	Azizbek Haydarov	(Uzbekistan)	MF	8 July 1985 (aged 22)	Lokomotiv Tashkent	2007		14	1
	Elyor Jahonov	(Uzbekistan)	MF	11 January 1986 (aged 21)		2007		4	0
	Victor Karpenko	(Uzbekistan)	MF	7 September 1977 (aged 30)	Kairat	2007		33	10
	Sergey Lushan	(Uzbekistan)	MF	14 June 1973 (aged 34)	Yunit Samara	2007		29	5
	Yannis Mandzukas	(Uzbekistan)	MF	8 April 1984 (aged 23)	Kimyogar Chirchiq	2007		29	2
	Yorqin Nazarov	(Uzbekistan)	MF	11 October 1974 (aged 33)	Da My Nghe	2007		7	1
	Vyacheslav Ponomarev	(Uzbekistan)	MF	2 January 1978 (aged 29)	Pakhtakor Tashkent	2007		16	0
	Anvar Rakhimov	(Uzbekistan)	MF	20 February 1988 (aged 19)	Xorazm FK Urganch	2007		3	0
	Shavkat Salomov	(Uzbekistan)	MF	13 November 1985 (aged 22)	Buxoro	2007		34	10
	Timur Yafarov	(Uzbekistan)	MF	30 November 1986 (aged 21)	Lokomotiv Tashkent	2007		25	0
Forwards
	Patrick Agbo	(Nigeria)	FW	21 October 1981 (aged 26)	Al-Faisaly	2007		26	7
	Miraziz Jalalov	(Uzbekistan)	FW	22 January 1992 (aged 15)	Youth Team	2007		2	1
	Dmitry Kuzin	(Uzbekistan)	FW	11 July 1991 (aged 16)	Youth Team	2007		8	1
	Ilkhom Muminjonov	(Uzbekistan)	FW	21 January 1979 (aged 28)	Lokomotiv Tashkent	2007		19	16
	Ernest Sedko	(Uzbekistan)	FW			2007		2	0
	Vladimir Shishelov	(Uzbekistan)	FW	8 November 1979 (aged 28)	Oryol	2007		20	6
Unknown
	Farruh Miryunusov	(Uzbekistan)				2007		1	0
	Mirgolib Raimov	(Uzbekistan)				2007		7	0
Out on Loan
Players who left during the season
	Erkin Boydullayev	(Uzbekistan)	MF	10 October 1984 (aged 23)	Sogdiana Jizzakh	2007		14	0

== Transfers ==
=== In ===
Date	Position	Nationality	Name	From	Fee	Ref.
Winter 2007	GK	(Uzbekistan)	Oleg Belyakov	Navbahor Namangan	Undisclosed	
Winter 2007	GK	(Uzbekistan)	Pavel Bugalo	Ordabasy	Undisclosed	
Winter 2007	DF	(Turkmenistan)	Goçguly Goçgulyýew	Kairat	Undisclosed	
Winter 2007	DF	(Uzbekistan)	Bakhtiyor Ashurmatov	Krylia Sovetov	Undisclosed	
Winter 2007	DF	(Uzbekistan)	Sakhob Juraev	Lokomotiv Tashkent	Undisclosed	
Winter 2007	DF	(Uzbekistan)	Aleksandr Khvostunov	Navbahor Namangan	Undisclosed	
Winter 2007	DF	(Uzbekistan)	Abdumajid Toirov	Topalang Sariosiyo	Undisclosed	
Winter 2007	MF	(Turkmenistan)	Witaliý Alikperow	Nasaf	Undisclosed	
Winter 2007	MF	(Uzbekistan)	Erkin Boydullayev		Free	
Winter 2007	MF	(Uzbekistan)	Rashidjon Gafurov	Mash'al Mubarek	Undisclosed	
Winter 2007	MF	(Uzbekistan)	Jasur Hasanov	Mash'al Mubarek	Undisclosed	
Winter 2007	MF	(Uzbekistan)	Victor Karpenko	Kairat	Undisclosed	
Winter 2007	MF	(Uzbekistan)	Sergey Lushan	Yunit Samara	Undisclosed	
Winter 2007	MF	(Uzbekistan)	Yannis Mandzukas	Kimyogar Chirchiq	Undisclosed	
Winter 2007	MF	(Uzbekistan)	Vyacheslav Ponomarev	Pakhtakor Tashkent	Undisclosed	
Winter 2007	MF	(Uzbekistan)	Anvar Rakhimov	Xorazm Urganch	Undisclosed	
Winter 2007	MF	(Uzbekistan)	Shavkat Salomov	Buxoro	Undisclosed	
Winter 2007	MF	(Uzbekistan)	Timur Yafarov	Lokomotiv Tashkent	Undisclosed	
Winter 2007	FW	(Nigeria)	Patrick Agbo	Navbahor Namangan	Undisclosed	
Winter 2007	FW	(Uzbekistan)	Vladimir Shishelov	Oryol	Undisclosed	
Summer 2007	MF	(Uzbekistan)	Azizbek Haydarov	Lokomotiv Tashkent	Undisclosed	
Summer 2007	MF	(Uzbekistan)	Yorqin Nazarov	Da My Nghe	Undisclosed	
Summer 2007	FW	(Uzbekistan)	Ilkhom Muminjonov	Lokomotiv Tashkent	Undisclosed	

=== Out ===
Date	Position	Nationality	Name	To	Fee	Ref.
Summer 2007	MF	(Uzbekistan)	Erkin Boydullayev	Lokomotiv Tashkent	Undisclosed	

== Competitions ==
=== Uzbek League ===
==== League table ====
Pos	Team	Pld	W	D	L	GF	GA	GD	Pts	Qualification or relegation
1	Pakhtakor	30	26	4	0	83	13	+70	82	2008 AFC Champions League Group stage
2	Kuruvchi	30	22	5	3	62	16	+46	71	2008 AFC Champions League Group stage
3	Mash'al Mubarek	30	22	4	4	62	25	+37	70	
4	Neftchi Farg'ona	30	19	4	7	53	28	+25	61	
5	FK Samarqand-Dinamo	30	14	8	8	48	36	+12	50	

Updated to match(es) played on 6 December 2007. Source: Uzbekistan Professional Football League
Rules for classification: 1) points; 2) goal difference; 3) number of goals scored.

==== Results summary ====
Overall								Home						Away					
Pld	W	D	L	GF	GA	GD	Pts	W	D	L	GF	GA	GD	W	D	L	GF	GA	GD
30	22	5	3	62	16	+46	71	11	2	2	35	9	+26	11	3	1	27	7	+20

Last updated: 6 December 2007.
Source: See Results

==== Results by round ====
Round	1	2	3	4	5	6	7	8	9	10	11	12	13	14	15	16	17	18	19	20	21	22	23	24	25	26	27	28	29	30
Ground	A	H	A	H	A	H	A	H	A	H	A	A	H	A	H	A	H	A	H	H	A	H	A	H	A	H	A	H	A	H
Result	W	W	W	L	W	W	D	W	W	D	W	W	W	W	D	W	W	D	W	W	D	W	W	W	W	W	W	L	L	W

Source: See Results
A = Away; H = Home; W = Win; D = Draw; L = Loss

==== Results ====
3 March 2007 1	Vobkent	0 – 1	Kuruvchi	Bukhara
UZT (UTC+5)	A.Choriev (yellow card) 5'	Report	Shishelov 12'; Toirov (yellow card) 38'; Ashurmatov (yellow card) 63'	Stadium: Universiade Stadium; Attendance: 10,000; Referee: Valentin Kovalenko

17 March 2007 2	Kuruvchi	3 – 1	Lokomotiv Tashkent	Tashkent
UZT (UTC+5)	Toirov (yellow card) 12'; Salomov 45'; Mandzukas 51'; Boydullayev (yellow card) 78' (yellow-red card) 87'; Gafurov 80'; Lushan (yellow card) 84'	Report	Idiatullin 16'; S.Kobilov (yellow card) 20'; Haydarov (red card) 45'; J.Hamroaliev (yellow card) 60' (yellow-red card) 60'	Stadium: MHSK Stadium; Attendance: 5,000; Referee: Ravshan Irmatov

1 April 2007 3	Metallurg Bekabad	0 – 1	Kuruvchi	Bekabad
UZT (UTC+5)	B.Umarov (yellow card) 22'; U.Tozhimov (yellow card) 86'	Report	Lushan (yellow card) 15'; Gafurov 22'; Bugalo (yellow card) 54'; Ashurmatov (yellow card) 55'; Yafarov (yellow card) 59'	Stadium: A.Anokhin Stadium; Attendance: 3,000; Referee: Arslon Khotamov

7 April 2007 4	Kuruvchi	0 – 1	Traktor Tashkent	Tashkent
UZT (UTC+5)	Lushan (red card) 15'; Shishelov (yellow card) 55'; Alikperow (yellow card) 82'; Agbo (yellow card) 84'	Report	A.Tukhtaboev 49'; A.Osimov (yellow card) 51'; S.Bakanov (yellow card) 65'; T.Ayzatulov (yellow card) 82'	Stadium: MHSK Stadium; Attendance: 5,000; Referee: Yafar Najafaliev

14 April 2007 5	Mash'al Mubarek	0 – 1	Kuruvchi	Muborak
UZT (UTC+5)		Report	Karpenko 18'; Shishelov (yellow card) 45'	Stadium: Bahrom Vafoev Stadium; Attendance: 5,000; Referee: Khushvaqt Mukhtarov

21 April 2007 6	Kuruvchi	2 – 0	Qizilqum Zarafshon	Tashkent
UZT (UTC+5)	Hasanov 8'; Gafurov 44'; Yafarov (yellow card) 86'	Report	A.Gennady (yellow card) 62'; Davletov (yellow card) 79'; G.Zhumaev (yellow card) 81'	Stadium: MHSK Stadium; Attendance: 5,000; Referee: Bakhtiyor Togayev

28 April 2007 7	Dinamo Samarqand	1 – 1	Kuruvchi	Samarkand
UZT (UTC+5)	Hamraýew 5'; O.Gorvits (yellow card) 70'	Report	Lushan 46'; Ashurmatov (yellow card) 52'; Agbo (yellow card) 90'	Stadium: Dinamo Stadium; Attendance: 8,000; Referee: Hakim Sharipov

5 May 2007 8	Kuruvchi	3 – 1	Navbahor Namangan	Tashkent
UZT (UTC+5)	Karpenko 15', 84'; Shishelov 24' (yellow card) 38'	Report	A.Risqullaev (yellow card) 15'; R.Idrisov (yellow card) 37'; V.Baranov 42'	Stadium: MHSK Stadium; Attendance: 6,000; Referee: Shuhrat Karimov

10 May 2007 9	Buxoro	1 – 2	Kuruvchi	Bukhara
UZT (UTC+5)	Kashentsev (yellow card) 14'; Rajabov 58'; A.Muhitdinov (yellow card) 60'; B.Karimov (yellow card) 75'	Report	Salomov 34', 50'; Boydullayev (yellow card) 75'; Gafurov (yellow card) 83'	Stadium: Buxoro Arena; Attendance: 2,000; Referee: Rustam Saidov

18 May 2007 10	Kuruvchi	1 – 1	Pakhtakor Tashkent	Tashkent
UZT (UTC+5)	Lushan 39'; Hasanov (yellow card) 86'	Report	Inomov (yellow card) 39'; Magdeev 85'	Stadium: MHSK Stadium; Attendance: 12,000; Referee: Ravshan Irmatov

26 May 2007 11	Tupolang Sariosiyo	1 – 2	Kuruvchi	Tashkent
UZT (UTC+5)	B.Opara (yellow card) 13'; U.Abdurahmonov (yellow card) 14'; T.Mirzaev 32'; F.Khojaev (yellow card) 35'; A.Kurlaev (yellow card) 81'	Report	Gafurov (yellow card) 39' (goal) 84', 90'; Hasanov (yellow card) 44'; Lushan (yellow card) 76'	Stadium: Tupalang Stadium; Attendance: 4,000; Referee: Khushvaqt Mukhtarov

9 June 2007 12	Shurtan Guzar	0 – 4	Kuruvchi	G‘uzor
UZT (UTC+5)	N.Juraev (yellow card) 14'; Geworkýan (yellow card) 15'; S.Saifiev (yellow card) 54'; Khasanov (yellow card) 56'; A.Korneychuk (yellow card) 90'	Report	Gafurov 5'; Agbo 32'; Mandzukas 42'; Khvostunov (yellow card) 69'; Ashurmatov (yellow card) 90'	Stadium: G'uzor Stadium; Attendance: 5,000; Referee: Andrei Tambovtsev

18 June 2007 13	Kuruvchi	3 – 0	Nasaf	Tashkent
UZT (UTC+5)	Salomov 18'; Lushan 60'; Karpenko 67'; Bugalo (yellow card) 73'	Report	D.Karimkulov (yellow card) 78'	Stadium: MHSK Stadium; Attendance: 3,500; Referee: Marat Ismailov

22 June 2007 14	Andijon	0 – 2	Kuruvchi	Andijan
UZT (UTC+5)	Raimqulov (yellow card) 58'; Krushelnitskiy (yellow card) 62'	Report	Hasanov 9'; Shishelov 31'; Ashurmatov (yellow card) 40'; Lushan (yellow card) 55'	Stadium: Soghlom Avlod Stadium; Attendance: 9,000; Referee: Valentin Kovalenko

26 June 2007 15	Kuruvchi	0 – 0	Neftchi Fargʻona	Tashkent
UZT (UTC+5)	Toirov (yellow card) 87'; Gafurov (yellow card) 90'	Report	Melziddinov (yellow card) 50'	Stadium: MHSK Stadium; Attendance: 5,000; Referee: Khushvaqt Mukhtarov

6 August 2007 16	Neftchi Fargʻona	0 – 2	Kuruvchi	Fergana
19:00 UZT (UTC+5)	Melziddinov (yellow card) 50'	Report	Agbo (yellow card) 33'; Salomov 39'; Haydarov 55'; Muminjonov (yellow card) 86'; Ponomarev (yellow card) 89'	Stadium: Istiqlol Stadium; Attendance: 11,000; Referee: Valentin Kovalenko

15 August 2007 17	Kuruvchi	3 – 0	Andijon	Tashkent
18:00 UZT (UTC+5)	Salomov 30'; Ponomarev (yellow card) 37'; Karpenko 42'; Muminjonov 77'	Report	B.Sharipov (yellow card) 12'; A.Rahmonov (yellow card) 29' (yellow-red card) 62'	Stadium: MHSK Stadium; Attendance: 4,000; Referee: Oleg Rubakov

27 August 2007 18	Nasaf	1 – 1	Kuruvchi	Qarshi
18:00 UZT (UTC+5)	Musaev (yellow card) 58'; Saparow (yellow card) 86'; B.Haydarov 90'	Report	Salomov (yellow card) 56'; Goçgulyýew 62'	Stadium: Markaziy Stadium; Attendance: 8,000; Referee: Khushvaqt Mukhtarov

4 September 2007 19	Kuruvchi	3 – 0	Shurtan Guzar	Tashkent
18:00 UZT (UTC+5)	Karpenko 36'; Agbo (yellow card) 45'; Muminjonov 75', 77'; Hasanov (yellow card) 81'	Report	B.Borovik (yellow card) 23'; O.Mirzoev (yellow card) 73'	Stadium: MHSK Stadium; Attendance: 5,000; Referee: Alexander Popov

15 September 2007 20	Kuruvchi	4 – 1	Tupalang	Tashkent
18:00 UZT (UTC+5)	Muminjonov 19', 31'; Lushan 28'; Goçgulyýew 40'; Toirov (yellow card) 60'; Kuzin (yellow card) 82'	Report	O.Yusupov (yellow card) 54'; V.Keldiev 71'	Stadium: MHSK Stadium; Attendance: 6,000; Referee: Azamat Jalilov

22 September 2007 21	Pakhtakor Tashkent	0 – 0	Kuruvchi	Tashkent
16:00 UZT (UTC+5)	Inomov (yellow card) 10'; Geynrikh (yellow card) 89'	Report	Gafurov (yellow card) 28'; Ashurmatov (yellow card) 86'	Stadium: Pakhtakor Markaziy Stadium; Attendance: 10,000; Referee: Alexey Mironov

1 October 2007 22	Kuruvchi	2 – 0	Buxoro	Tashkent
17:00 UZT (UTC+5)	Goçgulyýew 4', 90'; Agbo (yellow card) 28'; Ashurmatov (yellow card) 82'	Report		Stadium: MHSK Stadium; Attendance: 4,000; Referee: Makset Begdullaev

6 October 2007 23	Navbahor Namangan	1 – 4	Kuruvchi	Namangan
16:00 UZT (UTC+5)	O.Nosirov (yellow card) 48'; D.Jabborov 89'	Report	Muminjonov 26', 59', 63'; Karpenko 54'; Ponomarev (yellow card) 65'; Goçgulyýew (yellow card) 69'	Stadium: Markaziy Stadium; Attendance: 15,000; Referee: Andrey Tambovtsev

20 October 2007 24	Kuruvchi	2 – 1	Dinamo Samarqand	Tashkent
16:00 UZT (UTC+5)	Hasanov (yellow card) 42'; Muminjonov 58', 62'; Haydarov (yellow card) 88'; Ashurmatov (yellow card) 90'	Report	Fayziev (yellow card) 33'; M.Hamroev (yellow card) 38'; Tadjiyev 90'; Oniya (yellow card) 90'	Stadium: MHSK Stadium; Attendance: 7,000; Referee: Ravshan Irmatov

2 November 2007 25	Qizilqum Zarafshon	0 – 2	Kuruvchi	Navoiy
15:00 UZT (UTC+5)		Report	Lushan (yellow card) 44'; Salomov 84'; Muminjonov 89'	Stadium: Yoshlar Stadium; Attendance: 4,000; Referee: Judge Sharipov

10 November 2007 26	Kuruvchi	2 – 0	Mash'al Mubarek	Tashkent
16:00 UZT (UTC+5)	Muminjonov 20', 32'	Report	Karimov (yellow card) 5' (red card) 45'; Gafurov (red card) 13'; Karimov (yellow card) 14'; Turaev (yellow card) 24'	Stadium: MHSK Stadium; Attendance: 3,000; Referee: Bakhtiyor Togaev

26 November 2007 27	Traktor Tashkent	0 – 3	Kuruvchi	Tashkent
16:00 UZT (UTC+5)	Khasanov (yellow card) 33'; Navkarov (yellow card) 45'	Report	Salomov (yellow card) 31' (goal) 64'; Muminjonov 69'; Karpenko 70'	Stadium: MHSK Stadium; Attendance: 2,000; Referee: Alexander Popov

30 November 2007 28	Kuruvchi	1 – 2	Metallurg Bekabad	Tashkent
15:00 UZT (UTC+5)	Jalalov 62'	Report	M.Raimov 46'; B.Umarov 53'	Stadium: MHSK Stadium; Attendance: 1,500; Referee: Rafael Ilyasov

3 December 2007 29	Lokomotiv Tashkent	2 – 1	Kuruvchi	Tashkent
UZT (UTC+5)	S.Ibodullaev 29'; Idiatullin 44'	Report	Muminjonov 49'; Lushan (yellow card) 51'; Hasanov (yellow card) 85'	Stadium: Lokomotiv Stadium; Attendance: 6,000; Referee: Alexey Mironov

6 December 2007 30	Kuruvchi	6 – 1	Vobkent	Tashkent
14:00 UZT (UTC+5)	Nazarov 12'; Karpenko 29'; Muminjonov 45'; Agbo 60', 90'; Khvostunov 82'	Report	I.Hamdamov 43'	Stadium: MHSK Stadium; Attendance: 1,000; Referee: Dmitry Roman

=== Uzbekistan Cup ===
13 March 2007 Last 32	Shakhrikhan	1 – 3 (a.e.t.)	Kuruvchi	Andijan
16:00 UZT (UTC+5)	Y.Qurbonov 62'	Report	Lushan 24' (pen.); Agbo 92'; Shishelov 117' (pen.)	Stadium: Soghlom Avlod Stadium; Attendance: 8,000; Referee: Rustam Saidov

10 April 2007 Last 16 1st leg	Traktor Tashkent	0 – 1	Kuruvchi	Tashkent
16:00 UZT (UTC+5)		Report	Karpenko 35'	Stadium: MHSK Stadium; Attendance: 500; Referee: Alexander Popov

14 June 2007 Last 16 2nd leg	Kuruvchi	4 – 0 (5 – 0 agg.)	Traktor Tashkent	Tashkent
17:00 UZT (UTC+5)	Agbo 14', 16'; Shishelov 75', 83'	Report		Stadium: MHSK Stadium; Attendance: 1,500; Referee: Ildar Shamsiev

30 June 2007 Quarterfinal 1st leg	Kuruvchi	3 – 0	Andijan	Tashkent
17:00 UZT (UTC+5)	Salomov 6'; Agbo 10'; Goçgulyýew 58'	Report		Stadium: MHSK Stadium; Attendance: 2,000; Referee: Ravshan Irmatov

11 August 2007 Quarterfinal 2nd leg	Andijan	0 – 1 (0 – 4 agg.)	Kuruvchi	Andijan
17:00 UZT (UTC+5)		Report	Toirov 6'	Stadium: Soghlom Avlod Stadium; Attendance: 3,500; Referee: Rustam Saidov

26 September 2007 Semifinal 1st leg	Mash'al Mubarek	0 – 0	Kuruvchi	Muborak
18:00 UZT (UTC+5)		Report		Stadium: Bahrom Vafoev Stadium; Attendance: 5,000; Referee: Rustam Saidov

6 November 2007 Semifinal 2nd leg	Kuruvchi	2 – 1 (2 – 1 agg.)	Mash'al Mubarek	Tashkent
18:00 UZT (UTC+5)	Salomov 35'; Kuzin 84'	Report	Klishin 73'	Stadium: MHSK Stadium; Attendance: 7,000; Referee: Ravshan Irmatov

==== Final ====
9 December 2007	Pakhtakor Tashkent	0 – 0 (7 – 6 p)	Kuruvchi	Tashkent
14:00 UZT (UTC+5)	Inomov (yellow card) 15'; Iheruome (red card) 23'; Ismailov (yellow card) 62'; Tadjiyev (yellow card) 108'	Report	Haydarov (yellow card) 45' (yellow-red card) 52'; Goçgulyýew (yellow card) 59'	Stadium: MHSK Stadium; Attendance: 11,500; Referee: Andrey Tambovtsev
	Penalties
	Jeparov (penalty scored); Inomov (penalty scored); Kapadze (penalty scored); K.Tajiev (penalty scored); Aliqulov (penalty scored); Magdeev (penalty scored); Juraev (penalty scored)		(penalty scored) Khvostunov; (penalty scored) Karpenko; (penalty scored) Nazarov; (penalty scored) Lushan; (penalty scored) Goçguly Goçgulyýew; (penalty scored) Salomov; (penalty missed) Gafurov

== Squad statistics ==
As of match played 9 December 2007

=== Appearances and goals ===
No.	Pos	Nat	Player	Total		Uzbek League		Uzbek Cup	
No.	Pos	Nat	Player	Apps	Goals	Apps	Goals	Apps	Goals
	GK	(Uzbekistan) UZB	Oleg Belyakov	10	0	5	0	3+2	0
	GK	(Uzbekistan) UZB	Pavel Bugalo	30	0	25	0	5	0
	DF	(Turkmenistan) TKM	Goçguly Goçgulyýew	16	5	12	4	4	1
	DF	(Uzbekistan) UZB	Bakhtiyor Ashurmatov	33	0	26	0	7	0
	DF	(Uzbekistan) UZB	Sakhob Juraev	9	0	3+3	0	0+3	0
	DF	(Uzbekistan) UZB	Abduqahhor Hojiakbarov	1	0	0+1	0	0	0
	DF	(Uzbekistan) UZB	Aleksandr Khvostunov	37	1	28+1	1	8	0
	DF	(Uzbekistan) UZB	Abdumajid Toirov	28	1	21+1	0	5+1	1
	MF	(Uzbekistan) UZB	Azizbek Haydarov	14	1	8+1	1	5	0
	MF	(Uzbekistan) UZB	Yorqin Nazarov	7	1	2+3	1	0+2	0
	MF	(Uzbekistan) UZB	Anvar Rakhimov	3	0	0+1	0	0+2	0
	MF	(Turkmenistan) TKM	Witaliý Alikperow	15	0	5+6	0	3+1	0
	MF	(Uzbekistan) UZB	Rashidjon Gafurov	35	6	26+1	6	6+2	0
	MF	(Uzbekistan) UZB	Jasur Hasanov	36	2	23+5	2	5+3	0
	MF	(Uzbekistan) UZB	Elyor Jahonov	4	0	0+1	0	1+2	0
	MF	(Uzbekistan) UZB	Victor Karpenko	33	10	25+2	9	6	1
	MF	(Uzbekistan) UZB	Sergey Lushan	29	5	23+1	4	5	1
	MF	(Uzbekistan) UZB	Yannis Mandzukas	29	2	5+18	2	2+4	0
	MF	(Uzbekistan) UZB	Vyacheslav Ponomarev	16	0	12	0	4	0
	MF	(Uzbekistan) UZB	Shavkat Salomov	34	10	25+2	8	6+1	2
	MF	(Uzbekistan) UZB	Timur Yafarov	25	0	15+4	0	3+3	0
	FW	(Nigeria) NGA	Patrick Agbo	26	7	10+10	3	4+2	4
	FW	(Uzbekistan) UZB	Miraziz Jalalov	2	1	0+2	1	0	0
	FW	(Uzbekistan) UZB	Dmitry Kuzin	8	1	1+6	0	0+1	1
	FW	(Uzbekistan) UZB	Ilkhom Muminjonov	19	16	9+5	16	2+3	0
	FW	(Uzbekistan) UZB	Ernest Sedko	2	0	0+1	0	0+1	0
	FW	(Uzbekistan) UZB	Vladimir Shishelov	20	6	14+2	3	2+2	3
		(Uzbekistan) UZB	Mirgolib Raimov	7	0	0+7	0	0	0
		(Uzbekistan) UZB	Farruh Miryunusov	1	0	1	0	0	0
Players who left Bunyodkor during the season:
	MF	(Uzbekistan) UZB	Erkin Boydullayev	14	0	6+5	0	2+1	0

=== Goal scorers ===
Place	Position	Nation	Name	Uzbek League	Uzbekistan Cup	Total
1	FW	(Uzbekistan)	Ilkhom Muminjonov	16	0	16
2	MF	(Uzbekistan)	Victor Karpenko	9	1	10
2	MF	(Uzbekistan)	Shavkat Salomov	8	2	10
4	FW	(Nigeria)	Patrick Agbo	3	4	7
5	MF	(Uzbekistan)	Rashidjon Gafurov	6	0	6
5	FW	(Uzbekistan)	Vladimir Shishelov	3	3	6
7	MF	(Uzbekistan)	Sergey Lushan	4	1	5
7	DF	(Turkmenistan)	Goçguly Goçgulyýew	4	1	5
9	MF	(Uzbekistan)	Yannis Mandzukas	2	0	2
9	MF	(Uzbekistan)	Jasur Hasanov	2	0	2
11	MF	(Uzbekistan)	Azizbek Haydarov	1	0	1
11	FW	(Uzbekistan)	Miraziz Jalalov	1	0	1
11	DF	(Uzbekistan)	Aleksandr Khvostunov	1	0	1
11	MF	(Uzbekistan)	Yorqin Nazarov	1	0	1
11	DF	(Uzbekistan)	Abdumajid Toirov	0	1	1
11	FW	(Uzbekistan)	Dmitry Kuzin	0	1	1
11		(Uzbekistan)	Unknown	1	0	1
			TOTALS	62	14	76

=== Clean sheets ===
Place	Position	Nation	Name	Uzbek League	Uzbekistan Cup	Total
1	GK	(Uzbekistan)	Pavel Bugalo	13	3	16
2	GK	(Uzbekistan)	Oleg Belyakov	3	4	7
			TOTALS	16	6	22

Bugalo & Belyakov both appeared in Kuruvchi's 0-0 draw in the Uzbekistan Cup Final on 9 December 2007

=== Disciplinary record ===
Position	Nation	Name	Uzbek League		Uzbekistan Cup		Total	
Position	Nation	Name	Booked	Sent off (straight red)	Booked	Sent off (straight red)	Booked	Sent off (straight red)
GK	(Uzbekistan)	Pavel Bugalo	2	0	0	0	2	0
DF	(Turkmenistan)	Witaliý Alikperow	1	0	0	0	1	0
DF	(Uzbekistan)	Bakhtiyor Ashurmatov	8	0	0	0	8	0
DF	(Uzbekistan)	Aleksandr Khvostunov	1	0	0	0	1	0
DF	(Uzbekistan)	Abdumajid Toirov	4	0	0	0	4	0
MF	(Uzbekistan)	Rashidjon Gafurov	4	0	0	0	4	0
MF	(Uzbekistan)	Jasur Hasanov	5	0	0	0	5	0
MF	(Uzbekistan)	Azizbek Haydarov	1	0	0	0	1	0
MF	(Uzbekistan)	Sergey Lushan	6	1	0	0	6	1
MF	(Uzbekistan)	Vyacheslav Ponomarev	3	0	0	0	3	0
MF	(Uzbekistan)	Shavkat Salomov	2	0	0	0	2	0
MF	(Uzbekistan)	Timur Yafarov	2	0	0	0	2	0
FW	(Nigeria)	Patrick Agbo	5	0	0	0	5	0
FW	(Uzbekistan)	Dmitry Kuzin	1	0	0	0	1	0
FW	(Uzbekistan)	Ilkhom Muminjonov	1	0	0	0	1	0
FW	(Uzbekistan)	Vladimir Shishelov	3	0	0	0	3	0
Players who left Bunyodkor during the season:
MF	(Uzbekistan)	Erkin Boydullayev	3	1	0	0	3	1
		TOTALS	52	2	0	0	52	2
