= List of FC Bunyodkor records and statistics =

FC Bunyodkor is a football club based in Tashkent that competes in Uzbek Professional Football League, the top football league in Uzbekistan, since season 2007. The club was founded in 2005 and played at the beginning in regional Tashkent liga, after that club qualified 2006 to Uzbekistan First League. Bunyodkor set some various records in winning various official competitions since its foundation and appearance in Top Uzbek League.

== Honours ==
=== Domestic ===
==== League ====
- Uzbek League: 5
  - 2008, 2009, 2010, 2011, 2013
- Uzbek League runner-up: 1
  - 2012
- Uzbekistan First League: 1
  - 2006

==== Cups ====
- Uzbek Cup: 4
  - 2008, 2010, 2012, 2013
- Uzbekistan Super Cup: 1
  - 2014

==== Doubles ====
- Uzbek League and Uzbek Cup doubles: 3
  - 2008, 2010, 2013

=== Asian ===
- AFC Champions League semifinal: 2
  - 2008, 2012

== Awards ==
=== Club Player of the Year ===
This award is organized by club and winner is defined by votes via club's official website.

Year	Place	Nat.	Player	Points
2007	1	(Uzbekistan)	Shavkat Salomov	
2008	1	(Uzbekistan)	Server Djeparov	
2009	1	(Brazil)	Rivaldo	
2010	1	(Uzbekistan)	Viktor Karpenko	520
2010	2	(Uzbekistan)	Ignatiy Nesterov	390
2010	3	(North Macedonia)	Stevica Ristic	310
2011	1	(Uzbekistan)	Viktor Karpenko	336
2011	2	(Uzbekistan)	Ignatiy Nesterov	229
2011	3	(Serbia)	Miloš Trifunović	82

=== Fair Play ===
The yearly award given by UFF.

Year	Club	Notes
2008	Bunyodkor	
2009	Bunyodkor	
2010	Bunyodkor	

== Player records ==
=== Most appearances ===
See also List of FC Bunyodkor former players

This is a list of players with the most officials appearances for the club in all competitions. Players whose name is listed in bold are currently playing for club.

Statistics correct as of 5 December 2017.

	Name	Years	Matches (total)	Matches (start list)	Matches (substitute)
1	(Uzbekistan) **Anvar Gafurov**	2009-	232	219	13
2	(Uzbekistan) **Hayrulla Karimov**	2008-	224	217	7
3	(Uzbekistan) **Viktor Karpenko**	2007–2012, 2015-	219	178	41
4	(Uzbekistan) Akmal Shorakhmedov	2011–2016	195	184	11
5	(Uzbekistan) Jasur Hasanov	2007-2010, 2012-2014	188	161	27
6	(Uzbekistan) Sakhob Juraev	2007-2014	182	158	24
7	(Uzbekistan) **Jovlon Ibrokhimov**	2011-	178	166	12
8	(Uzbekistan) Shavkat Salomov	2007–2012	160	102	58
9	(Uzbekistan) Ignatiy Nesterov	2009–2014	158	0	0
10	(Uzbekistan) Anvar Soliev	2008–2013	158	82	76

=== Goalscorers ===
==== General goalscorers records ====
- Most goals scored in all official competitions: **65** – Anvar Soliev, 2008–2013
- Most goals scored in one season in all official competitions: **27** – Oleksandr Pyschur, 2013
- Most goals scored in one season Uzbek League: **20** – Rivaldo, 2009
- Most goals scored in one Uzbek Cup: **7** – Stevica Ristic, 2010
- Most goals scored in Tashkent derby: **4** – Shavkat Salomov, 2007–2012
- Most goals scored in AFC Champions League: **8** – Anvarjon Soliev, 2008-2012
- Most goals scored in one season AFC Champions League: **5** – Denilson, 2010

==== All time topscorers ====
This is list of club topscorers in all competitions. Names in bold indicate players currently playing in the club.

As of 5 December 2017

	Name	Years	Goals
1	(Uzbekistan) Anvar Soliev	2008–2013	65
2	(Brazil) Rivaldo	2008–2010	43
3	(Uzbekistan) **Victor Karpenko**	2007–2012, 2015–	39
4	(Uzbekistan) Server Djeparov	2008–2010	38
5	(Uzbekistan) **Dostonbek Khamdamov**	2014-	35
6	(Ukraine) Oleksandr Pyschur	2013–2014	34
7	(Uzbekistan) Shavkat Salomov	2007–2012	30
8	(Chile) José Luis Villanueva	2008-2009	28
9	(Serbia) Miloš Trifunović	2011	22
10	(Uzbekistan) Sardor Rashidov	2009–2015	22

==== Season 2007 ====
Goals scored only in League matches

	Name	Goals
1	(Uzbekistan) Ilhom Mo'minjonov	21 (1) ^{1}

Ilhom Mo'minjonov scored 16 goals for Bunyodkor of 21 and 5 goals for Lokomotiv Tashkent.

==== Season 2008 ====
#	Name	League	Cup	AFC	Total
1	(Uzbekistan) Server Djeparov	19 (7)	1	1	21
2	(Uzbekistan) Anvar Soliev	12	2	2	16
3	(Chile) José Luis Villanueva	6	4	4	14
4	(Uzbekistan) Ulugbek Bakaev	8	1	1	10
5	(Brazil) Rivaldo	7	0	2	9

==== Season 2009 ====
#	Name	League	Cup	AFC	Total
1	(Brazil) Rivaldo	20	1	1	22
1	(Uzbekistan) Anvar Soliev	18	2	2	22
3	(Chile) José Luis Villanueva	13	1	0	14
4	(Uzbekistan) Server Djeparov	11	0	2	13
5	(Uzbekistan) Victor Karpenko	3	1	2	6

==== Season 2010 ====
#	Name	League	Cup	AFC	Total
1	(North Macedonia) Stevica Ristic	11	7	0	18
2	(Brazil) Rivaldo	6	4	2	12
3	(Brazil) Denilson	4	1	5	10
4	(Uzbekistan) Timur Kapadze	6	1	0	7

==== Season 2011 ====
#	Name	League	Cup	AFC	Total
1	(Serbia) Miloš Trifunović	17	2	3	22
2	(Uzbekistan) Anvar Soliev	8	2	1	11
3	(Uzbekistan) Viktor Karpenko	7	0	1	8

==== Season 2012 ====
#	Name	League	Cup	AFC	Total
1	(Uzbekistan) Anvar Soliev	7	4	2	13
2	(Uzbekistan) Shavkat Salomov	6	4	1	11
3	(Slovakia) Ján Kozák	5	2	0	7
=	(Uzbekistan) Bahodir Pardaev	5	2	0	7
=	(Uzbekistan) Lutfulla Turaev	2	2	3	7

==== Season 2013 ====
#	Name	League	Cup	AFC	Total
1	(Ukraine) Oleksandr Pyschur	19	5	3	27
2	(Uzbekistan) Lutfulla Turaev	7	0	0	7
=	(Uzbekistan) Oleg Zoteev	5	2	0	7

==== Season 2014 ====
#	Name	League	Cup	AFC	Total
1	(Uzbekistan) Sardor Rashidov	10	4	1	15
2	(Uzbekistan) Vokhid Shodiev	6	4	2	12
3	(Ukraine) Oleksandr Pyschur	6	1	1	8

==== Season 2015 ====
#	Name	League	Cup	AFC	Total
1	(Uzbekistan) Dostonbek Khamdamov	10	4	0	14
2	(Uzbekistan) Vokhid Shodiev	7	1	1	9
3	(Uzbekistan) Eldor Shomurodov	7	1	0	8

=== Award winners ===
Uzbekistan Footballer of the Year

The following players have won the Footballer of the Year award while playing for Bunyodkor:

- (Uzbekistan) Server Djeparov – 2008, 2010

Uzbek League Top Scorer

The following players have won the Uzbek League Top Scorer while playing for Bunyodkor:

- (Uzbekistan) Ilhom Mo'minjonov (21 goals) – 2007
- (Uzbekistan) Server Djeparov (19 goals) – 2008
- (Brazil) Rivaldo (20 goals) – 2009
- (Serbia) Miloš Trifunović (17 goals) – 2011
- (Ukraine) Oleksandr Pyschur (19 goals) – 2013

== Team records ==
=== Uzbek League ===
==== Points ====
Most points in a season

- 86 points (in three points for a win system) or 95,55%, becoming the Uzbek team with most points in a 30 game season in the 2009 season, 28 wins and 2 draws.

Season	Champion (Points)	Points	Max. points	%
1992	Pakhtakor, Neftchi	51	64	79,68
1993	Neftchi	52	60	86,66
1994	Neftchi	51	60	85
1995	Neftchi	76	90	84,44
1996	Navbahor Namangan	74	90	84,44
1997	MHSK Tashkent	90	102	88,23
1998	MHSK Tashkent	76	90	84,44
1999	Dustlik	64	90	71,11
2000	Dustlik	94	114	82,45
2001	Neftchi	44	102	82,35
2002	Pakhtakor	74	90	82,22
2003	Pakhtakor	77	90	85,55
2004	Pakhtakor	69	78	88,46
2005	Pakhtakor	65	78	83,33
2006	Pakhtakor	77	90	85,55
2007	Pakhtakor	82	90	91,11
2008	Bunyodkor	79	90	87,77
2009	Bunyodkor	86	90	95,55
2010	Bunyodkor	65	78	83,33

Note: 1992-1994 Uzbek league seasons was 2 point system for a win.

==== Wins ====
Most consequent wins

In the season 2008 Bunyodkor made a new record by winning 22 matches in the row. Previous record belongs to MHSK Tashkent with 20 consequent wins in the season.

Season	Club	Wins in a row
2009	Bunyodkor	22
1996-97	MHSK Tashkent	21 (2+19)
2001-02	Pakhtakor	14 (3+11)
1993	Neftchi	13
1995	Neftchi	13
1996	Navbahor Namangan	13
2000	Neftchi	13
2008	Bunyodkor	12

==== Goals ====
Best goal difference in the season

With +72 goal difference in season 2009 Bunyodkor repeated record of Pakhtakor of the season 2007.

Season	Champion	GF	GA	GD
2009	Bunyodkor	85	13	72
2006	Pakhtakor	84	12	72
2007	Pakhtakor	83	13	70
1998	Pakhtakor	96	29	67
1998	MHSK Tashkent	82	27	67

== IFFHS World Club Ranking ==
FC Bunyodkor is listed in Top 400 club by IFFHS. Actually the highest ranking of the club was reached in November 2008, the club ranked at 51st position.

In the newest annual list of Top 400 club of 2011 published on January 13, 2012, Bunyodkor finished at 205th position.

Last updated list: 1 January 2011 - 31 December 2011'

Date of issue	Type of ranking	Position	Points
November 2008	monthly	51	
5 December 2008	monthly	59	
12 January 2009	annual (2008)	70	
4 February 2009	monthly	66	137.0
September 2009	monthly	65	
5 October 2009	monthly	64	135.0
4 December 2009	monthly	92	
7 January 2010	monthly	98	
3 February 2010	monthly	98	
March 2010	monthly	84	
7 April 2010	monthly	93	
May 2010	monthly	111	
3 June 2010	monthly	125	
12 January 2011	annual (2010)	177	96.5
September 2011	monthly	224	
4 October 2011	monthly	204	
4 December 2011	monthly	201	
1 January 2011 - 31 December 2011	annual (2011)	205	86.0
