= List of FC Bunyodkor players =

Bunyodkor Football Club is an Uzbek professional football club based in Tashkent, Uzbekistan. The club was formed 2005 in Tashkent, and played its first matches in Tashkent regional liga in Uzbekistan Second League with name Neftgazmontaj-Quruvchi. The club was renamed PFC Quruvchi in 2006. The club played its matches at MHSK Stadium. Since playing their first matches, more than 50 players have made a competitive first-team appearance for the club.

Anvar Gafurov presently holds the team record for number of matches played for the club. He made 228 appearances ahead of Hayrulla Karimov with 222 caps (as of 22 November 2015).

Anvarjon Soliev is club's all-time top scorer with 65 goals, of which 46 were scored in league competition, making him the Bunyodkor player who has scored the most goals in the Uzbek League. The 2nd top scorer is Rivaldo with 43 goals, Server Djeparov and Victor Karpenko are third with 38 goals.

Bunyodkor has employed several famous players such 1999 FIFA World Player and Ballon d'Or winner Rivaldo.

== List of players ==
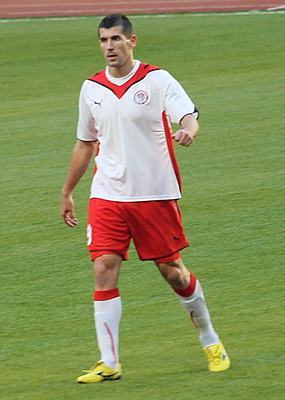
Stevica Ristić is Bunyodkor's top scorer in 2010

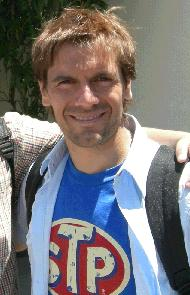
With 28 goals, Jose Luis Villanueva is one of the best club goal scorers

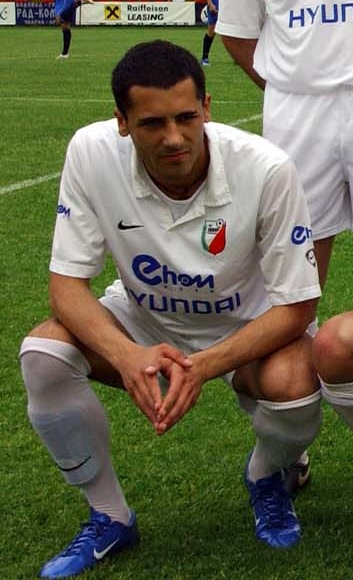
Miloš Trifunović 2011 League top scorer with 17 goals

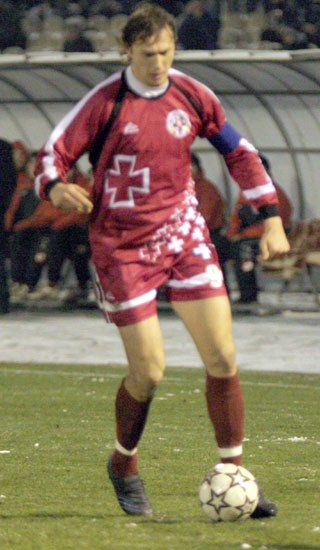
Oleksandr Pyschur 2013 League top scorer

Statistics correct as of 22 November 2015

Name	Nat	Position^{[NB]}	Bunyodkor career	Appearances	Goals	Notes
David Carney	(Australia)	DF	2012	13	1	
Edson Ramos Silva	(Brazil)	DF	2009-2010	61	3	
Luizão	(Brazil)	DF	2008-2009	28	2	
Denilson	(Brazil)	MF	2010	26	10	
Rivaldo	(Brazil)	MF	2008-2010	80	43	
João Victor	(Brazil)	MF	2009-2010	63	4	
José Luis Villanueva	(Chile)	FW	2008-2009	47	28	
Emil Kenzhesariev	(Kazakhstan)	DF	2012	13	0	
Patrick Umomo Agboh	(Nigeria)	FW	2006-2007	26	7	
Stevica Ristić	(North Macedonia)	FW	2010	24	18	
Saša Đorđević	(Serbia)	DF	2011	15	0	
Slavoljub Đorđević	(Serbia)	DF	2011-2012	38	1	
Uroš Milosavljević	(Serbia)	MF	2011	7	0	
Miloš Trifunović	(Serbia)	FW	2011	36	22	
Marko Blažić	(Serbia)	MF	2013	33	3	
Ján Kozák	(Slovakia)	MF	2012	36	7	
Goçguly Goçgulyýew	(Turkmenistan)	DF	2007–2010	76	12	
Oleksandr Pyschur	(Ukraine)	FW	2013–2014	69	34	
Pavel Bugalo	(Uzbekistan)	GK	2007–2010, 2014-	82	-	
Sergey Lushan	(Uzbekistan)	DF	2007-2008	39	6	
Bakhtiyor Ashurmatov	(Uzbekistan)	DF	2007-2009	62	1	
Aleksandr Khvostunov	(Uzbekistan)	DF	2007-2010	96	2	
Anzur Ismailov	(Uzbekistan)	DF	2010	39	3	
Islom Inomov	(Uzbekistan)	DF	2011	22	0	
Vyacheslav Ponomarev	(Uzbekistan)	MF	2007-2008	27	0	
Server Djeparov	(Uzbekistan)	MF	2008–2010	104	38	
Timur Kapadze	(Uzbekistan)	MF	2008-2010	106	17	
Asqar Jadigerov	(Uzbekistan)	MF	2011	31	2	
Azizbek Haydarov	(Uzbekistan)	MF	2009-2011	143	8	
Shavkat Salomov	(Uzbekistan)	MF	2007-2012	160	30	
Ruslan Melziddinov	(Uzbekistan)	MF	2009-2012	80	5	
Victor Karpenko	(Uzbekistan)	MF	2007-2012	203	38	
Yannis Mandzukas	(Uzbekistan)	MF	2007-2008, 2010	59	7	
Anvar Rakhimov	(Uzbekistan)	MF	2010-2011	28	4	
Ilhom Mo'minjonov	(Uzbekistan)	FW	2007-2008	19	16	
Vladimir Shishelov	(Uzbekistan)	FW	2007	20	6	
Anvarjon Soliev	(Uzbekistan)	FW	2008-2013	158	65	
Kamoliddin Murzoev	(Uzbekistan)	FW	2009-2013	87	13	
Anvar Rajabov	(Uzbekistan)	FW	2008-2012	51	9	
Ulugbek Bakayev	(Uzbekistan)	FW	2008-2009	39	10	
Ignatiy Nesterov	(Uzbekistan)	GK	2009-2013	158	-	
Anvar Gafurov	(Uzbekistan)	DF	2009-	228	7	
Jasur Hasanov	(Uzbekistan)	MF	2007–2013	188	17	
Lutfulla Turaev	(Uzbekistan)	MF	2011–2013	81	14	
Bahodir Pardaev	(Uzbekistan)	FW	2008-2014	61	17	
Alibobo Rakhmatullaev	(Uzbekistan)	MF	2008-2014	61	3	
Artyom Filiposyan	(Uzbekistan)	DF	2012–2013, 2015	85	1	
Anvar Berdiev	(Uzbekistan)	FW	2013-	28	5	
Sardor Rashidov	(Uzbekistan)	FW	2009-2015	78	22	
Igor Taran	(Uzbekistan)	FW	2013	25	6	
Oleg Zoteev	(Uzbekistan)	MF	2013-2014	69	12	
Sakhob Juraev	(Uzbekistan)	DF	2011-2014	182	2	
Murod Zukhurov	(Uzbekistan)	GK	2008-	84	-	
Hayrulla Karimov	(Uzbekistan)	DF	2009-	222	5	
Dilshod Djuraev	(Uzbekistan)	DF	2011-	72	2	
Akmal Shorakhmedov	(Uzbekistan)	DF	2011-	168	6	
Jovlon Ibrokhimov	(Uzbekistan)	MF	2011–	150	9	
