= 2007 King's Cup =

Tournament details
- Host country: Thailand
- Dates: 22–29 December
- Teams: 4 (from 1 confederation)
- Venue(s): 1 (in 1 host city)

Final positions
- Champions: Thailand (13th title)
- Runners-up: Iraq B
- Third place: North Korea
- Fourth place: Uzbekistan

Tournament statistics
- Matches played: 7
- Goals scored: 19 (2.71 per match)
- Top scorer(s): (Thailand) Sarayoot Chaikamdee (Thailand) Nataporn Phanrit (Uzbekistan) Pavel Solomin (Uzbekistan) Farhod Tadjiyev (Iraq) Wissam Zaki (2 goals each)

The 38th King's Cup finals were held from 22 to 29 December 2007 at the Rajamangala Stadium in Bangkok, Thailand. The King's Cup (คิงส์คัพ) is an annual football tournament; the first tournament was played in 1968.

Hosts Thailand won the tournament beating the B-Side of Iraq 1–0 in the final. Uzbekistan and Korea DPR were the other teams to play in this tournament. Iraq B-Side was represented by Erbil SC.

There was no prize money for the participants.

== Venue ==
Bangkok
Rajamangala Stadium
Capacity: 49,772
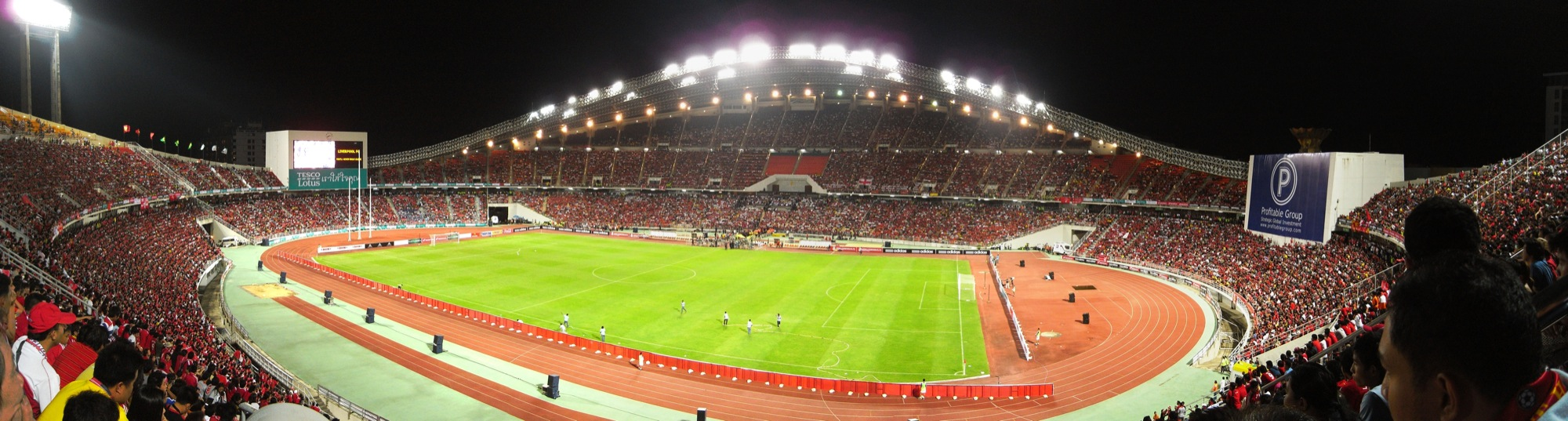

== Matches ==
=== Round robin tournament ===
Pos	Team	Pld	W	D	L	GF	GA	GD	Pts
1	Thailand	3	3	0	0	6	3	+3	9
2	Iraq B	3	2	0	1	5	3	+2	6
3	North Korea	3	0	1	2	2	4	−2	1
4	Uzbekistan	3	0	1	2	5	8	−3	1

Source: RSSSF
22 December 2007
17:00 UTC+7

Thailand	3–2	Uzbekistan
Chaikamdee 9' (pen.); Phanrit 90'		Tadjiyev 44', 60'

Rajamangala Stadium, Bangkok

22 December 2007
19:15 UTC+7

Iraq B	1–0	North Korea
Zaki 64'

Rajamangala Stadium, Bangkok

24 December 2007
16:30 UTC+7

North Korea	2–2	Uzbekistan
An Chol-hyok 41'; Kim Kum-il 90'		Solomin 53'; Yafarov 65'

Rajamangala Stadium, Bangkok

24 December 2007
18:45 UTC+7

Thailand	2–1	Iraq B
Phanrit 43'; Abd Ali 83' (o.g.)		Mubarak 49'

Rajamangala Stadium, Bangkok

26 December 2007
16:30 UTC+7

Iraq B	3–1	Uzbekistan
Alwan 58'; Ibrahim 65'; Zaki 78'		Solomin 68' (pen.)

Rajamangala Stadium, Bangkok

26 December 2007
18:45 UTC+7

Thailand	1–0	North Korea
Phetphun 54'

Rajamangala Stadium, Bangkok

=== Final ===
29 December 2007
18:00 UTC+7

Thailand	1–0	Iraq B
Vachiraban 67'

Rajamangala Stadium, Bangkok

== Winner ==
2007 King's Cup champion

Thailand
13th title

== Scorers ==
2 goals:

- (Iraq) Wissam Zaki
- (Thailand) Sarayoot Chaikamdee
- (Thailand) Nataporn Phanrit
- (Uzbekistan) Pavel Solomin
- (Uzbekistan) Farhod Tadjiyev

1 goal:

- (Iraq) Muslim Mubarak
- (Iraq) Ahmed Salah
- (Iraq) Khaldoun Ibrahim
- (North Korea) An Chol-hyok
- (North Korea) Kim Kum-il
- (Thailand) Patiparn Phetphun
- (Thailand) Narongchai Vachiraban
- (Uzbekistan) Timur Yafarov

Own goals

- (Iraq) Ahmad Abd Ali (playing against Thailand)
