= Kamoliddin Tajiev =

Uzbek footballer (born 1983)

Personal information
- Date of birth: 3 May 1983 (age 43)
- Place of birth: Jizzakh, Uzbek SSR, Soviet Union
- Height: 1.91 m (6 ft 3 in)
- Position: Defender

Youth career
- 2001–2002: Akademiya Toshkent

Senior career*
Years	Team	Apps	(Gls)
2002–2011	Pakhtakor Tashkent	93	(5)
2006	→ Sogdiana Jizzakh (loan)	18	(1)
2011–2013	Jiangsu Sainty	70	(1)
2014–2018	Pakhtakor Tashkent	78	(6)
2019–2021	Metallurg Bekabad	62	(2)
Total		321	(15)

International career
2007–2016	Uzbekistan	11	(0)
- * Club domestic league appearances and goals

Kamoliddin Tajiev (Uzbek: Kamoliddin Tojiyev, Uzbek Cyrillic: Камолиддни Тожиев; born 3 May 1983 in Jizzakh) is a former Uzbek footballer who played as a defender in the Uzbekistan national team.

== Club career ==
Kamoliddin Tajiev would join top-tier club Pakhtakor Tashkent in the 2002 Uzbek League season where he played a minor role as the team won the championship. After several seasons with the club he was loaned out to Sogdiana Jizzakh to gain more playing time, however while he was a regular within the team he was unable to aid them from avoiding relegation to the second tier at the end of the 2006 Uzbek League season. Upon his return to Pakhtakor he would start to become a regular within the team until in 2011 he decided to ply his trade in the Chinese Super League and clinched a contract with top-tier club Jiangsu Sainty.

== Career statistics ==
As of 21 November 2021

Appearances and goals by club, season and competition
Club	Season	League			National cup		Continental		Other		Total	
Club	Season	Division	Apps	Goals	Apps	Goals	Apps	Goals	Apps	Goals	Apps	Goals
Pakhtakor Tashkent	2001	Uzbek League	5	0			—		—		5	0
Pakhtakor Tashkent	2002	Uzbek League	3	0					—		3	0
Pakhtakor Tashkent	2003	Uzbek League	6	1					—		6	1
Pakhtakor Tashkent	2004	Uzbek League	6	0					—		6	0
Pakhtakor Tashkent	2005	Uzbek League	2	0					—		2	0
Pakhtakor Tashkent	2006	Uzbek League	3	0					—		3	0
Pakhtakor Tashkent	2007	Uzbek League	16	1					—		16	1
Pakhtakor Tashkent	2008	Uzbek League	7	0			2	1	—		9	1
Pakhtakor Tashkent	2009	Uzbek League	19	2	0	0	3	0	—		22	2
Pakhtakor Tashkent	2010	Uzbek League	16	1	1	0	6	0	—		23	1
Pakhtakor Tashkent	2011	Uzbek League	10	0	1	0	3	0	—		14	0
Pakhtakor Tashkent	Total		93	5	2	0	14	1	—		109	6
Sogdiana Jizzakh (loan)	2006	Uzbek League	18	1			—		—		18	1
Jiangsu Sainty	2011	Chinese Super League	17	1	1	0	—		—		18	1
Jiangsu Sainty	2012	Chinese Super League	25	0	0	0	—		—		25	0
Jiangsu Sainty	2013	Chinese Super League	28	0	0	0	6	0	1	0	35	0
Jiangsu Sainty	Total		70	1	1	0	6	0	1	0	78	1
Pakhtakor Tashkent	2014	Uzbek League	20	1	4	0	—		—		24	1
Pakhtakor Tashkent	2015	Uzbek League	9	2	2	0	0	0	—		11	2
Pakhtakor Tashkent	2016	Uzbek League	23	2	0	0	6	0	1	0	30	2
Pakhtakor Tashkent	2017	Uzbek League	19	1	2	0	—		—		21	1
Pakhtakor Tashkent	2018	Uzbekistan Super League	7	0	0	0	0	0	—		7	0
Pakhtakor Tashkent	Total		78	6	8	0	6	0	1	0	93	6
Metallurg Bekabad	2019	Uzbekistan Super League	24	1	0	0	—		0	0	24	1
Metallurg Bekabad	2020	Uzbekistan Super League	24	0	0	0	—		—		24	0
Metallurg Bekabad	2021	Uzbekistan Super League	14	1	4	1	—		—		18	2
Metallurg Bekabad	Total		62	2	4	1	—		0	0	66	3
Career total			321	15	15	1	26	1	2	0	354	17

== International career ==
#	Date	Venue	Opponent	Score	Tournament
1	February 7, 2007	Karaganda, Kazakhstan	Azerbaijan	0–0	Friendly match
2	March 9, 2007	Shymkent, Kazakhstan	Kyrgyzstan	6–0	Alma TV Cup
3	March 11, 2007	Shymkent, Kazakhstan	Kazakhstan	1–1	Alma TV Cup
4	December 24, 2007	Bangkok, Thailand	North Korea	2–2	King's Cup
5	August 20, 2008	Muscat, Oman	Oman	0–2	Friendly match
6	February 1, 2009	Dubai, UAE	Azerbaijan	1–1	Friendly match
7	March 25, 2011	Podgorica, Montenegro	Montenegro	0–1	Friendly match
8	May 29, 2014	Tashkent, Uzbekistan	Oman	0–1	Friendly match
9	August 24, 2016	Tashkent, Uzbekistan	Burkina Faso	1–0	Friendly match

== Honours ==
=== Player ===
Pakhtakor Tashkent

- Uzbek League: 2002, 2003, 2004, 2005, 2007, 2014, 2015

Jiangsu Sainty

- Chinese FA Super Cup: 2013

=== Manager ===
Pakhtakor FC

- Uzbekistan Cup : 2025

Individual

- Uzbekistan Super League Coach of the Month: May 2025
