= Goçguly Goçgulyýew =

Turkmenistani footballer

Personal information
- Full name: Goçguly Hangulyýewiç Goçgulyýew
- Date of birth: 26 May 1977 (age 49)
- Place of birth: Balkanabat, Turkmen SSR, Soviet Union
- Height: 1.85 m (6 ft 1 in)
- Position: Defender

Senior career*
Years	Team	Apps	(Gls)
1997–2000	Köpetdag Aşgabat	0	(0)
2001	Irtysh Pavlodar	15	(0)
2002–2005	Pakhtakor Tashkent	80	(26)
2006	Kairat	12	(0)
2007–2010	Bunyodkor	55	(9)
2011–2012	Gara Altyn		

International career^{‡}
2000–2012	Turkmenistan	26	(1)
- * Club domestic league appearances and goals as of 8 March 2016 ‡ National team caps and goals as of 27 September 2009

Goçguly Hangulyýewiç Goçgulyýew (born 26 May 1977) is a retired Turkmen footballer, and current assistant coach of Altyn Asyr FK.

== Club career ==
He graduated from the youth football school in Balkanabat. He began his career at Arkaç in 1994. Later he played for such Turkmen clubs as FC Balkan, FC Buzmeyin and Köpetdag Aşgabat.

In 2001 played for Kazakhstan club FC Irtysh.

In 2002, he made his debut in the championship of Uzbekistan in Pakhtakor. In Pakhtakor he became four-time champion of Uzbekistan (2002, 2003, 2004, 2005). In 2006, he moved to Kazakhstan FC Kairat. Spent one season in 2007 and the second round back to Uzbekistan, where up to 2010 played for Bunyodkor Tashkent.

In 2011, he returned to his native city Balkanabad, becoming a player of FC Gara Altyn.

== Career statistics ==
=== Club ===
As of match played 26 October 2010

Appearances and goals by club, season and competition
Club	Season	League			National Cup		Continental		Total	
Club	Season	Division	Apps	Goals	Apps	Goals	Apps	Goals	Apps	Goals
Bunyodkor	2007	Uzbek League	12	4	4	1	-		16	5
Bunyodkor	2008	Uzbek League	23	3	4	1	6	1	29	4
Bunyodkor	2009	Uzbek League	12	1	1	0	5	0	18	1
Bunyodkor	2010	Uzbek League	8	1	1	0	0	0	9	1
Bunyodkor	Total		55	9	10	2	11	1	76	12
Career total			55	9	10	2	11	1	76	12

=== International ===
Turkmenistan national team
Year	Apps	Goals
2000	1	0
2001	6	1
2002	0	0
2003	0	0
2004	6	0
2005	0	0
2006	0	0
2007	4	0
2008	5	0
2009	0	0
2010	0	0
2011	4	0
2012	0	0
Total	26	1

Statistics accurate as of match played 28 July 2011

== Honours ==
=== Team ===
Pakhtakor Tashkent

- Uzbek League (4): 2002, 2003, 2004, 2005

Bunyodkor

- Uzbek League (3): 2008, 2009, 2010
- Uzbekistani Cup (2): 2008, 2010
