= 2006 Uzbek League =

Uzbek League
- Season: 2006
- Champions: Pakhtakor Tashkent
- Relegated: Sogdiana Jizzakh; Xorazm FK Urganch
- Champions League: Pakhtakor; Neftchi Farg'ona
- Top goalscorer: Pavel Solomin; 21 goals

The 2006 Uzbek League season was the 15th edition of top level football in Uzbekistan since independence from the Soviet Union in 1992.

== League table ==
Pos	Team	Pld	W	D	L	GF	GA	GD	Pts	Qualification or relegation
1	Pakhtakor	30	25	2	3	84	12	+72	77	2007 AFC Champions League: Group stage
2	Neftchi Farg'ona	30	23	2	5	60	23	+37	71	2007 AFC Champions League: Group stage
3	Nasaf Qarshi	30	22	4	4	63	33	+30	70	
4	Mash'al Mubarek	30	18	6	6	50	28	+22	60	
5	Traktor Tashkent	30	15	4	11	51	46	+5	49	
6	Qizilqum Zarafshon	30	14	6	10	51	37	+14	48	
7	Navbahor Namangan	30	13	5	12	46	35	+11	44	
8	FK Samarqand-Dinamo	30	12	4	14	39	39	0	40	
9	Lokomotiv Tashkent	30	10	8	12	39	55	−16	38	
10	FK Andijan	30	10	5	15	46	52	−6	35	
11	FK Buxoro	30	9	7	14	35	34	+1	34	
12	Shurtan	30	10	2	18	43	55	−12	32	
13	Tupolang Sariosiyo	30	9	4	17	40	58	−18	31	
14	Metallurg Bekabad	30	7	7	16	36	45	−9	28	
15	Sogdiana Jizzakh (R)	30	7	3	20	23	48	−25	24	Relegation to Lower Division
16	Xorazm Urganch (R)	30	0	3	27	21	127	−106	3	Relegation to Lower Division

Updated to match(es) played on 12 November 2006. Source: Uzbekistan Professional Football League
Rules for classification: 1) points; 2) goal difference; 3) number of goals scored.
(R) Relegated

== Season statistics ==
=== Top goalscorers ===
Rank	Player	Club	Goals
1	(Uzbekistan) Pavel Solomin	Traktor	21
2	(Uzbekistan) Nosirbek Otakuziev	Neftchi	19
3	(Turkmenistan) Arif Mirzoýew	Navbahor	18
3	(Uzbekistan) Server Djeparov	Pakhtakor	18
5	(Uzbekistan) Bakhtiyor Hamidullaev	Andijan	17
5	(Nigeria) Uche Iheruome	Pakhtakor	17
7	(Uzbekistan) Kamoliddin Murzoev	Metallurg (8)/ Mash'al (7)	15
7	(Turkmenistan) Witaliý Alikperow	Nasaf	15
9	(Uzbekistan) Zayniddin Tadjiyev	Pakhtakor	14
10	(Uzbekistan) Igor Taran	Shurtan	13
10	(Uzbekistan) Marsel Idiatullin	Lokomotiv	13
12	(Uzbekistan) Zafar Kholmurodov	Mash'al (1)/ Nasaf (11)	12
13	(Uzbekistan) Bakhrom Umarov	Metallurg	11
13	(Uzbekistan) Rustam Kodirov	Mash'al	11
15	(Uzbekistan) Anvar Soliev	Pakhtakor	10
15	(Uzbekistan) Ilhom Mo'minjonov	Traktor	10

Last updated: 12 November 2006
