= Artyom Filiposyan =

Uzbekistani footballer

Personal information
- Full name: Artyom Filiposyan
- Date of birth: 6 January 1988 (age 38)
- Place of birth: Mubarek, Uzbek SSR, Soviet Union
- Height: 1.88 m (6 ft 2 in)
- Position: Centre-back

Senior career*
Years	Team	Apps	(Gls)
2006–2008	Mash'al Mubarek	44	(1)
2009–2011	Nasaf Qarshi	62	(3)
2012–2013	Bunyodkor	38	(1)
2014	Liaoning Whowin	4	(0)
2014	Lokomotiv Tashkent	6	(0)
2015	Bunyodkor	9	(0)
2015	Dinamo Samarqand	12	(1)
2016–2018	Buxoro	56	(3)
2019	PT Prachuap	29	(1)
2020	TIRA-Persikabo	3	(0)
2021	PT Prachuap	12	(0)
2021-2022	Muangkan United	14	(0)
2022	Sogdiana Jizzakh	15	(0)
2022-2023	AGMK	11	(0)
2023	Surkhon Termez	2	(0)
2023-24	FC Kokand 1912	12	(0)
2024	FC Bukhara	13	(0)

International career^{‡}
2010–2013	Uzbekistan	13	(0)
- * Club domestic league appearances and goals as of 9 January 2022 ‡ National team caps and goals as of 31 March 2013

Artyom Filiposyan (Russian: Артём Филипосян, born 6 January 1988) is an Uzbek professional footballer who plays as a centre-back.

== Career ==
=== Club ===
He began his playing career at Mash'al Mubarek. After two seasons he moved to Nasaf Qarshi where he spent three seasons. In 2011, he became with Nasaf winner of AFC Cup and runners-up in Uzbek League and Uzbek Cup.

On 14 December 2011 Bunyodkor announced signing Filiposyan.

In February 2014, Filiposyan was signed by Chinese Super League side Liaoning Whowin. On 29 May 2014, he was released along with Billy Celeski. On 1 July 2014 he signed 6 months contract with Lokomotiv Tashkent.

=== International ===
He made debut for national team in 2009 as he called up by coach Mirjalol Qosimov into first team squad. He appeared in 2011 AFC Asian Cup by coach Vadim Abramov and he was one of main successful key players for Uzbekistan national football team by gaining 4th.

In 2014 WC qualifying, he with Ki Sung-Yueng of South Korea had been convicted both for scoring own goal. The match ended 2-2 in Tashkent.

== Honours ==
=== Club ===
Nasaf

- Uzbek League runner-up (1): 2011
- Uzbek Cup runner-up (1): 2011
- AFC Cup winner: 2011

Bunyodkor

- Uzbek League (1): 2013
- Uzbek League runner-up (1): 2011
- Uzbek Cup (2): 2012, 2013
- AFC Champions League semifinal: 2012

Lokomotiv

- Uzbek League runner-up (1): 2014
- Uzbek Cup (1): 2014

PT Prachuap FC

- Thai League Cup (1) : 2019

== Career statistics ==
Club	Season	Apps	Goals
Mash'al Mubarek	2006	6	0
Mash'al Mubarek	2007	8	0
Mash'al Mubarek	2008	30	1
	Total	44	1
Nasaf Qarshi	2009	27	2
Nasaf Qarshi	2010	23	1
Nasaf Qarshi	2011	12	0
	Total	62	3
Bunyodkor	2012	19	1
Bunyodkor	2013	19	0
	Total	38	1
Liaoning Whowin	2014	4	0
Lokomotiv Tashkent	2014	6	0
