= 2005 Uzbek League =

Uzbek League
- Season: 2005
- Champions: Pakhtakor Tashkent
- Champions League: Pakhtakor; Mash'al Mubarek
- Top goalscorer: Anvar Soliev; 29 goals

The 2005 Uzbek League season was the 14th edition of top-level football in Uzbekistan since independence from the Soviet Union in 1992.

== Overview ==
It was contested by 14 teams, and Pakhtakor Tashkent won the championship.

== League table ==
Pos	Team	Pld	W	D	L	GF	GA	GD	Pts	Qualification
1	Pakhtakor	26	21	2	3	78	15	+63	65	2006 AFC Champions League: Group stage
2	Mash'al Mubarek	26	19	2	5	54	24	+30	59	2006 AFC Champions League: Group stage
3	Nasaf Qarshi	26	16	3	7	50	31	+19	51	
4	Traktor Tashkent	26	13	2	11	48	43	+5	41	
5	Neftchi Farg'ona	26	13	1	12	40	28	+12	40	
6	Navbahor Namangan	26	12	3	11	31	31	0	39	
7	Qizilqum Zarafshon	26	11	4	11	33	32	+1	37	
8	FK Samarqand-Dinamo	26	11	3	12	28	32	−4	36	
9	Tupolang Sariosiyo	26	11	2	13	33	45	−12	35	
10	Lokomotiv Tashkent	26	9	3	14	39	46	−7	30	
11	Metallurg Bekabad	26	9	2	15	32	47	−15	29	
12	FK Buxoro	26	9	2	15	37	59	−22	29	
13	Shurtan	26	6	1	19	23	56	−33	19	Relegation to Relegation play-off
14	Sogdiana Jizzakh	26	5	4	17	16	53	−37	19	Relegation to Relegation play-off

Updated to match(es) played on 7 November 2005. Source: Uzbekistan Professional Football League
Rules for classification: 1) points; 2) goal difference; 3) number of goals scored.

== Relegation play-off ==
Pos	Team	Pld	W	D	L	GF	GA	GD	Pts	Promotion
1	Shurtan	3	3	0	0	14	3	+11	9	Promotion to Uzbek League
2	Sogdiana Jizzakh	3	2	0	1	7	5	+2	6	Promotion to Uzbek League
3	Vobkent	3	1	0	2	5	9	−4	3	
4	NBU Osiyo	3	0	0	3	1	10	−9	0	

Updated to match(es) played on 17 November 2005. Source: Uzbekistan Professional Football League
Rules for classification: 1) points; 2) goal difference; 3) number of goals scored.

== Season statistics ==
=== Top goalscorers ===
Rank	Player	Club	Goals
1	(Uzbekistan) Anvar Soliev	Pakhtakor	29
2	(Uzbekistan) Zafar Kholmurodov	Nasaf	24
3	(Uzbekistan) Shuhrat Mirkholdirshoev	Mash'al	20
4	(Uzbekistan) Nagmetulla Kutibayev	Qizilqum	13
5	(Uzbekistan) Marsel Idiatullin	Lokomotiv	11
5	(Uzbekistan) Bakhriddin Vakhobov	Mash'al	11
7	(Uzbekistan) Anvar Berdiev	Neftchi	10
7	(Uzbekistan) Server Djeparov	Pakhtakor	10
7	(Uzbekistan) Viktor Klishin	Lokomotiv	10
7	(Uzbekistan) Pavel Solomin	Traktor/Pakhtakor	10
