= 2013 Uzbekistan PFL Cup =

Tournament details
- Country: Uzbekistan
- Teams: 10

Final positions
- Champions: Olmaliq FK
- Runner-up: FK Pakhtakor-2

The 2013 Uzbekistan PFL Cup is the first edition of a pre-season football competition held in Uzbekistan. 2013 saw the competition as a prelude to the 2013 domestic football season. Not all teams from Uzbekistan took part, notably Lokomotiv Tashkent and Pakhtakor were represented by their second string sides.

The competition featured two groups of 5 teams, with the top two advancing to the semi-final stages.

== Semi finals ==
=== Final ===
18 February 2013

Olmaliq FK	3–0	FK Pakhtakor-2
