= Rashidjon Gafurov =

Uzbekistani footballer

Personal information
- Full name: Rashidjon Aleksandrovich Gafurov
- Date of birth: 26 September 1977 (age 49)
- Place of birth: Chartak, Uzbek SSR, Soviet Union
- Height: 1.75 m (5 ft 9 in)
- Position: Midfielder

Senior career*
Years	Team	Apps	(Gls)
1995	Chilanzar Tashkent		
1996–2005	Navbahor Namangan	212	(42)
2006	Mash'al Mubarek	19	(1)
2007–2008	Quruvchi Tashkent/Bunyodkor	45	(7)

International career^{‡}
1998–2002	Uzbekistan	12	(1)

Managerial career
- 2016—: Navbahor Namangan
- * Club domestic league appearances and goals as of 17 December 2015 ‡ National team caps and goals as of 17 December 2015

Rashidjon Aleksandrovich Gafurov (born 26 September 1977) is a former Uzbekistani International footballer who played as a midfielder.

== Career statistics ==
=== Club ===
As of match played 23 November 2008

Appearances and goals by club, season and competition
Club	Season	League			National Cup		Continental		Total	
Club	Season	Division	Apps	Goals	Apps	Goals	Apps	Goals	Apps	Goals
Bunyodkor	2007	Uzbek League	27	6	8	0	-		35	6
Bunyodkor	2008	Uzbek League	18	1	4	0	5	0	27	1
Bunyodkor	Total		45	7	12	0	5	0	62	7
Career total			45	7	12	0	5	0	62	7

=== International ===
Uzbekistan national team
Year	Apps	Goals
1998	7	1
1999	0	0
2000	0	0
2001	4	0
2002	1	0
Total	12	1

Statistics accurate as of 17 March 2016

=== International goals ===
As of 17 March 2016

#	Date	Venue	Opponent	Score	Result	Competition	Ref
1.	19 November 1998	Salt Lake Stadium, Kolkata, India	India	4–0	4–0	Friendly	

== Honours ==
Navbahor Namangan

- Uzbek Cup (1): 1998

Bunyodkor

- Uzbek League (1): 2008
- Uzbek Cup (1): 2008
