= Lutfulla Turaev =

Uzbek footballer (born 1988)

Personal information
- Date of birth: 30 March 1988 (age 38)
- Place of birth: Yangiyer, Sirdarya, Uzbekistan
- Height: 1.78 m (5 ft 10 in)
- Position: Midfielder

Senior career*
| Years | Team | Apps | (Gls) |
| 2004–2008 | Mash'al Mubarek | 97 | (2) |
| 2009–2011 | Nasaf Qarshi | 73 | (4) |
| 2011–2013 | Bunyodkor | 49 | (9) |
| 2014–2015 | Lokomotiv Tashkent | 52 | (6) |
| 2015–2016 | FELDA United | 16 | (8) |
| 2016–2017 | Terengganu | 10 | (4) |
| 2017–2018 | AGMK | 41 | (1) |
| 2019–2021 | Bunyodkor | 70 | (4) |
| 2022–2023 | Neftchi Fergana | 18 | (3) |

International career
| | Uzbekistan U20 | 17 | (5) |
| | Uzbekistan U21 | 12 | (2) |
- Uzbekistan U23
| 2010–2020 | Uzbekistan | 24 | (0) |
- * Club domestic league appearances and goals

Lutfulla Turaev (Uzbek: Lutfulla To'rayev or Лутфулла Тўраев, born 30 March 1988) is an Uzbek former professional footballer.

== Club career ==
=== Nasaf Qarshi ===
In 2010, Turaev signed a two-year contract with Uzbek League club Nasaf Qarshi. In 2010 season he played 21 games, scoring 2 goal.

=== Bunyodkor ===
In December 2011 he moved to Bunyodkor on free transfer.

== International career ==
In 2010, Turaev made his debut for the Uzbekistan national team.

== Career statistics ==
As of 22 March 2015

| Club | Season | Apps | Goals |
|---|---|---|---|
| Mash'al | 2004 | 14 | 1 |
| Mash'al | 2005 | 10 | 0 |
| Mash'al | 2006 | 21 | 1 |
| Mash'al | 2007 | 25 | 0 |
| Mash'al | 2008 | 27 | 0 |
| | Total | 97 | 2 |
| Nasaf | 2009 | 28 | 1 |
| Nasaf | 2010 | 24 | 1 |
| Nasaf | 2011 | 21 | 2 |
| | Total | 73 | 4 |
| Bunyodkor | 2012 | 25 | 2 |
| Bunyodkor | 2013 | 24 | 7 |
| | Total | 49 | 9 |
| Lokomotiv | 2014 | 25 | 2 |
| Lokomotiv | 2015 | 2 | 0 |
| | Total | 27 | 2 |

== Honours ==
Mash'al Mubarek

- Uzbek League runner-up: 2005
- Uzbek Cup runner-up: 2006

Nasaf Qarshi

- Uzbek League runner-up: 2011
- Uzbek Cup runner-up: 2011
- AFC Cup: 2011

Bunyodkor

- Uzbek League: 2013
- Uzbek Cup: 2013; runner-up 2012

Lokomotiv Tashkent

- Uzbek League runner-up: 2014
- Uzbek Cup: 2014
- Uzbekistan Super Cup: 2014
