= Vyacheslav Ponomarev =

Vyacheslav Ponomarev or Vyacheslav Ponomaryov may refer to:

- Vyacheslav Ponomarev (footballer), an Uzbek footballer
- Vyacheslav Ponomarev (public figure), in Donbas, a self-declared mayor of Sloviansk
