= Yorqin Nazarov =

Uzbekistani footballer

Personal information
- Full name: Yorqin Nazarov
- Date of birth: 11 October 1974 (age 52)
- Place of birth: Uzbekistan
- Height: 1.82 m (6 ft 0 in)
- Position: Midfielder

Senior career*
Years	Team	Apps	(Gls)
1992–1997	Pakhtakor Tashkent	92	(13)
1997	Qizilqum Zarafshon	10	(1)
1998	Pakhtakor Tashkent	6	(0)
1999	Traktor Tashkent	14	(13)
1999	Sintez	1	(0)
2000–2001	Surkhon Termez	34	(7)
2001	Taraz	5	(0)
2002	Qizilqum Zarafshon	13	(0)
2003	Dinamo Samarqand	18	(5)
2003–2004	Muktijoddha Sangsad KC	19	(9)
2004	Yassi-Sairam	30	(4)
2005	Ordabasy	8	(0)
2005–2006	Navbahor Namangan	24	(6)
2007	Ho Chi Minh City	8	(2)
2007	Kuruvchi	5	(1)
2008	Qizilqum Zarafshon	8	(0)
2008–2009	Vasco	11	(0)

International career^{‡}
1997	Uzbekistan	1	(0)

Managerial career
- 2022: Turon
- * Club domestic league appearances and goals as of 18 February 2019 ‡ National team caps and goals as of 17 October 1997

Yorqin Nazarov (born 11 October 1974) is a retired Uzbekistan international footballer, who played as a midfielder.

== Career statistics ==
=== International ===
Uzbekistan national team
Year	Apps	Goals
1997	1	0
Total	1	0
