= 2007 Uzbek League =

Uzbek League
- Season: 2007
- Champions: Pakhtakor
- Relegated: Vobkent
- Champions League: Pakhtakor; Kuruvchi
- Top goalscorer: Ilhom Mo'minjonov; 21 goals

The 2007 Uzbek League season was the 16th edition of top-level football in Uzbekistan since independence from the Soviet Union in 1992.

== Overview ==
It was contested by 16 teams, and Pakhtakor Tashkent won the championship.

== League table ==
Pos	Team	Pld	W	D	L	GF	GA	GD	Pts	Qualification or relegation
1	Pakhtakor	30	26	4	0	83	13	+70	82	2008 AFC Champions League Group stage
2	Kuruvchi	30	22	5	3	62	16	+46	71	2008 AFC Champions League Group stage
3	Mash'al Mubarek	30	22	4	4	62	25	+37	70	
4	Neftchi Farg'ona	30	19	4	7	53	28	+25	61	
5	FK Samarqand-Dinamo	30	14	8	8	48	36	+12	50	
6	Nasaf Qarshi	30	13	5	12	43	43	0	44	
7	Qizilqum Zarafshon	30	12	3	15	42	64	−22	39	
8	Navbahor Namangan	30	11	4	15	37	41	−4	37	
9	FK Buxoro	30	11	3	16	29	43	−14	36	
10	FK Andijan	30	10	5	15	37	45	−8	35	
11	Traktor Tashkent	30	11	1	18	45	58	−13	34	
12	Tupolang Sariosiyo	30	8	6	16	29	43	−14	30	
13	FC Shurtan Guzar	30	8	5	17	32	51	−19	29	
14	Lokomotiv Tashkent	30	6	8	16	25	44	−19	26	
15	Metallurg Bekabad (R)	30	6	5	19	32	62	−30	23	Relegation to Lower Division
16	Vobkent FK (R)	30	3	6	21	23	70	−47	15	Relegation to Lower Division

Updated to match(es) played on 6 December 2007. Source: Uzbekistan Professional Football League
Rules for classification: 1) points; 2) goal difference; 3) number of goals scored.
(R) Relegated

== Season statistics ==
=== Top goalscorers ===
Rank	Player	Club	Goals (Pen.)
1	(Uzbekistan) Ilhom Mo'minjonov	Lokomotiv / Kuruvchi	21 (1)
2	(Uzbekistan) Farhod Tadjiyev	Dinamo	20 (3)
3	(Tajikistan) Akmal Kholmatov	Neftchi	19 (3))
4	(Uzbekistan) Zafar Kholmurodov	Nasaf	17 (5)
5	(Uzbekistan) Olim Navkarov	Traktor	16 (1)
5	(Uzbekistan) Alexander Geynrikh	Pakhtakor	16 (2)
7	(Uzbekistan) Viktor Klishin	Mash'al	14
7	(Uzbekistan) Rustam Kodirov	Mash'al	14
7	(Uzbekistan) Karlen Abramov	Traktor	14 (1)
10	(Uzbekistan) Vladimir Baranov	Navbahor	12
10	(Uzbekistan) Server Djeparov	Pakhtakor	12 (2)
12	(Nigeria) Uche Iheruome	Pakhtakor	11
13	(Uzbekistan) Anvar Soliev	Pakhtakor	10
13	(Uzbekistan) Timur Islomov	Qizilqum	10

Last updated: 6 December 2007
