= Numon Khasanov =

Uzbekistani footballer

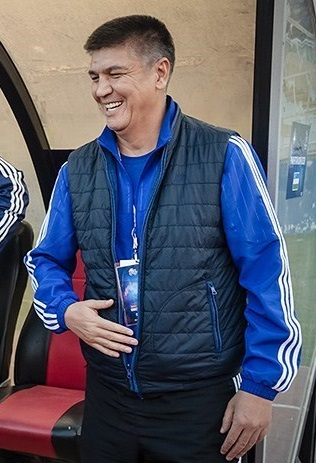
- Khasanov in 2016

Personal information
- Full name: Numon Nurmatovich Khasanov
- Date of birth: 2 October 1971 (age 55)
- Place of birth: Paxtakor, Uzbek SSR, Soviet Union
- Position: Forward

Senior career*
Years	Team	Apps	(Gls)
1989–1990	Avtomobilist	34	(6)
1990	Sokhibkor Khalkabad	7	(0)
1990–1993	Pakhtakor	85	(25)
1995–1997	MHSK Tashkent	101	(54)
1998	Rubin Kazan	8	(0)
1998	Avtomobilist	16	(2)
1998–2000	Dustlik	47	(15)
2001–2002	Nasaf Qarshi	36	(11)
2002–2003	Dustlik	21	(0)
2003	Kokand 1912	12	(3)
2004–2005	Traktor Tashkent	43	(13)
2006–2007	Shurtan	42	(5)
2007	Traktor Tashkent	12	(2)
2008	Sogdiana Jizzakh	17	(1)
2009	Lokomotiv Tashkent	14	(0)

International career
1992–2007	Uzbekistan	23	(4)

Managerial career
- 2002–2003: Dustlik
- 2012: Pakhtakor-2 Chilanzar
- 2012–2013: Pakhtakor Tashkent (youth)
- 2014–2015: Pakhtakor Tashkent (assistant)
- 2015–2016: Pakhtakor Tashkent
- 2016–2019: Kokand 1912
- 2020: Navbahor Namangan (caretaker)
- 2020–2021: Navbahor Namangan
- 2022: Istaravshan
- 2023–: Khujand
- * Club domestic league appearances and goals

Numon Khasanov (Uzbek: Нўмон Нурматович Хасанов or No'mon Nurmatovich Khasanov) is an Uzbekistani football manager and former player who is head coach of Khujand. A forward, he played for Uzbekistan in the 1996 Asian Cup.

== Playing career ==
Khasanov played for Pakhtakor, MHSK Tashkent, Rubin, Dustlik, Nasaf Qarshi and Traktor Tashkent.

He won his first championship in Uzbek League with Pakhtakor Tashkent in 1992. In 1997, he won Uzbek League with MHSK Tashkent and twice with Dustlik in 1999, 2000.

In 1998, he moved to Rubin Kazan and completed 8 matches for the club. His last station was Lokomotiv Tashkent where he played in 2009. He scored 126 goals in Uzbek League, entering Gennadi Krasnitsky club. In his career he scored in all competitions totally 153 goals.

== Managerial career ==
In 2012, Khasanov was appointed as head coach of Pakhtakors farm club, Pakhtakor-2 Chilanzar. On 24 July 2012, Numon Khasanov resigned his position and was appointed as head coach of Pakhtakor Youth team. He won with Pakhtakor Youth in 2012 Uzbek Youth League, the championship of youth squads of Uzbek League teams. In January 2014 he was appointed as assistant coach to Samvel Babayan who was named as new trainer of Pakhtakor.

On 7 July 2015, he was named as head coach of Pakhtakor after Samvel Babayan resigned his post to take charge of Uzbek national team.

On 1 May 2023, Khasanov was appointed as Head Coach of Tajikistan Higher League club Khujand.

== Honours ==
=== Player ===
Pakhtakor Tashkent

- Soviet First League runner-up: 1991
- Uzbek League: 1992
- Uzbek Cup: 1992

MHSK Tashkent

- Uzbek League: 1997

Dustlik

- Uzbek League: 1999, 2000
- Uzbek Cup: 2000

=== Manager ===
Pakhtakor Tashkent

- Uzbek League: 2015

=== Individual ===
- Uzbekistan Footballer of the Year third place: 1999
- Gennadi Krasnitsky club: 153 goals
