= Sergey Lushan =

Uzbekistani footballer

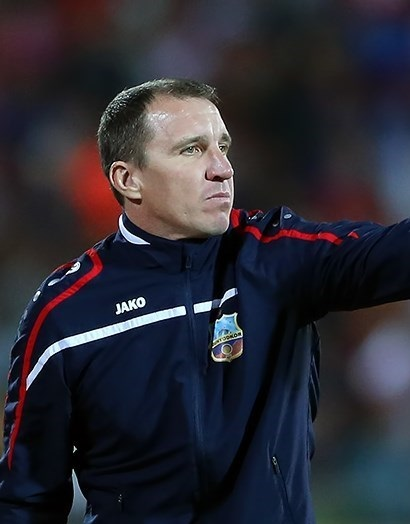

Personal information
- Full name: Sergey Ivanovich Lushan
- Date of birth: 14 June 1973 (age 53)
- Place of birth: Bekabad, Uzbek SSR, Soviet Union
- Height: 1.85 m (6 ft 1 in)
- Positions: Defender; midfielder

Senior career*
Years	Team	Apps	(Gls)
1993	Patriot Moscow		
1993	Madanchi Bekobod	11	(1)
1994–1996	Okean Nakhodka	93	(11)
1997–1999	Krylia Sovetov Samara	65	(3)
2000–2002	Rostselmash Rostov-na-Donu	52	(0)
2003–2004	Krylia Sovetov Samara	5	(0)
2004	Uralan Elista	3	(0)
2005	Metallurg Lipetsk	26	(1)
2006	Yunit Samara	21	(1)
2007–2008	Bunyodkor	28	(5)

International career
1998–2003	Uzbekistan	28	(1)

Managerial career
- 2011–2013: Bunyodkor (youth)
- 2013–2014: Bunyodkor-2
- 2014: Uzbekistan U19
- 2014–2015: Bunyodkor
- 2016–2017: Bunyodkor
- 2018–2019: Sogdiana Jizzakh
- 2020: Dinamo Samarqand
- 2023: Shakhtyor Petrikov
- * Club domestic league appearances and goals

Sergey Ivanovich Lushan (Russian: Серге́й Иванович Лущан; born 14 June 1973) is an Uzbekistani football manager and former professional footballer who played as a defender.

== Career ==
=== Club ===
His youth football career began in Pakhtakor football academy at age of six. Lushan first professional club was Patriot Moscow. The most of his playing career he played for Russian clubs Okean Nakhodka, Krylia Sovetov Samara, Rostselmash Rostov-na-Donu and other. In 2007, he moved to Bunyodkor and completed two seasons for the club.

=== International ===
Lushan has appeared in 28 matches and scored one goal for the full Uzbekistan national football team since his debut in 1998. He made his debut in a friendly against India on 16 November 1998.

=== Managerial ===
In 2008, he finished his playing career in Bunyokdor and was appointed as director club's youth academy. In 2011, he was named as coach Bunyodkor Youth, reserve team which plays in Uzbek Youth League. In 2013-2014 he was head coach of Bunyodkor-2, club playing in Uzbekistan First League. On 11 March 2014 he was appointed as new head coach of Uzbekistan U-19 team after Alexey Evstafeev resigned his post.

On 6 June 2014 he left his post at Uzbekistan U-19 team and was appointed as head coach of Bunyodkor. He replaced at this position temporary caretaker manager Alexander Volkov. After match Neftchi Farg'ona- Bunyodkor on 20 September 2015 he resigned and left his post on 23 September 2015.

== Career statistics ==
=== Club ===
As of match played 23 November 2008

Appearances and goals by club, season and competition
Club	Season	League			National Cup		Continental		Total	
Club	Season	Division	Apps	Goals	Apps	Goals	Apps	Goals	Apps	Goals
Bunyodkor	2007	Uzbek League	24	4	5	1	-		29	5
Bunyodkor	2008	Uzbek League	4	1	2	0	4	0	10	1
Bunyodkor	Total		28	5	7	1	4	0	39	6
Career total			28	5	7	1	4	0	39	6

=== International ===
Uzbekistan national team
Year	Apps	Goals
1998	7	0
1999	4	0
2000	3	1
2001	10	0
2002	1	0
2003	3	0
Total	28	1

Statistics accurate as of 17 March 2016

=== International goals ===
Scores and results list. Uzbekistan's goal tally first.

#	Date	Venue	Opponent	Score	Result	Competition
1.	17 October 2000	Saida Municipal Stadium, Saida, Lebanon	Japan	1–5	1–8	Continental championship

== Honours ==
Bunyodkor

- Uzbek League (1): 2008
- Uzbek Cup (1): 2008
