= Oleg Belyakov =

Uzbekistani footballer

Personal information
- Full name: Oleg Belyakov
- Date of birth: 1 February 1972 (age 54)
- Place of birth: Uzbekistan
- Position: Goalkeeper

Senior career*
Years	Team	Apps	(Gls)
1990	Sverdlovets Tashkent Oblast	6	(0)
1991	Konchi Angren	37	(0)
1992–1993	Kimyogar Chirchiq	29	(0)
1994–1995	MHSK Tashkent	29	(0)
1996–2000	Navbahor Namangan	58	(0)
2001	Pakhtakor Tashkent	19	(0)
2002	Navbahor Namangan	13	(0)
2002	Dinamo Samarqand	9	(0)
2003	Kryvbas Kryvyi Rih	13	(0)
2003	Pakhtakor Tashkent	2	(0)
2004	Shakhtyor Soligorsk	4	(0)
2004–2005	Turan Tovuz	30	(0)
2005	Metallurg Bekabad	13	(0)
2006	Navbahor Namangan	20	(0)
2007–2009	Kuruvchi	5	(0)

International career
1995–2001	Uzbekistan	15	(0)
- * Club domestic league appearances and goals as of 20 January 2013

Oleg Gennad'yevich Belyakov (Russian: Олег Геннадьевич Беляков; born on 2 February 1972) is a former football goalkeeper.

== Career ==
He played for several clubs in Uzbekistan, Ukraine, Azerbaijan.

In 1991 Konchi Angren football team (now it is not in present), 1991–1993 Chirchik FC (after it renamed as Kimyogar FC Chirchik), 1994–1995 MHSK Tashkent, 1996–1999 Navbahor Namangan, 2000 FC Pakhtakor Tashkent, 2001–2002 Navbahor Namangan, 2003 FC Kryvbas Kryvyi Rih, 2004 FC Pakhtakor Tashkent, 2005 Turan Tovuz PFC, 2005–2007 Metalourg Bekabad and from 2007 he is member of PFC Kuruvchi football team.
