= FC Gara Altyn =

Gara Altyn Balkanabat
- Full name: Gara Altyn Sport Kluby
- Nickname(s): Black Gold
- Founded: 2008
- Ground: Balkanabat Stadium, Balkanabat
- Capacity: 10,000
- League: Turkmenistan League
- 2008: 9th
Home colours

Gara Altyn Sport Kluby is a Turkmenistani football club based in Balkanabat. They played in the top division in Turkmenistani football in 2008. Their home stadium is Balkanabat Stadium which can hold 10,000 people. Last time played at 2011 Ýokary Liga.
