= Patrick Agbo =

Nigerian footballer (born 1981)

Personal information
- Full name: Patrick Umomo Agbo
- Date of birth: 21 October 1981 (age 45)
- Place of birth: Kaduna, Nigeria
- Height: 1.82 m (6 ft 0 in)
- Position: Forward

Senior career*
Years	Team	Apps	(Gls)
2000	Enyimba	0	(0)
2000–2001	Systema-Boreks Borodianka	20	(4)
2000–2001	→ CSKA-2 Kyiv (loan)	1	(0)
2001–2002	Metalurh Donetsk	4	(0)
2001–2002	→ Metalurh-2 Donetsk (loan)	28	(13)
2002–2003	Prykarpattia Ivano-Frankivsk	7	(0)
2003	→ Zorya-2 Luhansk (loan)	1	(1)
2003–2004	Zorya Luhansk	12	(3)
2003–2004	→ Avanhard-Inter Rovenky (loan)	1	(0)
2004	Dongguan Dongcheng		
2004	Navbahor Namangan	13	(7)
2004	Banants	14	(2)
2005–2006	Navbahor Namangan	26	(8)
2006–2007	Al-Faisaly		
2007	Kuruvchi	20	(3)
2008	Dinamo Samarqand	19	(0)
2009–2010	Shurtan Guzar	39	(2)
2011	Navbahor Namangan	11	(0)
2011–2012	Shurtan Guzar	33	(2)
- * Club domestic league appearances and goals

Patrick Umomo Agbo (born 21 October 1981) is a retired Nigerian footballer who played as a forward.
