= 2007 Uzbekistan Cup =

Tournament details
- Country: Uzbekistan
- Dates: March – November 2008
- Teams: 36

Final positions
- Champions: Pakhtakor
- Runners-up: Quruvchi

Tournament statistics
- Matches played: 49
- Goals scored: 152 (3.1 per match)

2007 Uzbekistan Cup (in Uzbek: Футбол бўйича 2007-йилги Ўзбекистон Кубоги) was a tournament organized by Uzbekistan Football Federation. A total of 36 professional clubs participated. The tournament was played in a knockout format from the 1st round onwards. The final match was held on December 9, 2007 at the MHSK stadium in Tashkent between "Kuruvchi" and "Pakhtakor". Pakhtakor won the cup for the 9th time (7th time in a row).

== First round ==
Pairs	Date	Eslatma
Pairs	2-mart	Eslatma
Lokomotiv BFK (Tashkent) — Shayxontohur (Tashkent)	1:0	
Oqtepa (Tashkent) — Kimyogar (Chirchiq)	1:3	
Romiton — Shoʻrchi-Lochin	0:1	
Shahrixon — Olimjon Akbarov (Yaypan)	3:1	
Uz-DongJu (Andijan) — Sementchi (Quvasoy)	2:1	
Gʻallakor-Avtomobilchi (Gallaaral) — Kattaqoʻrgʻon-Dinamo	0:3	
Zarafshon (Navoiy) — Jaykhun (Nukus)	4:1	
AGMK (Olmaliq) — Kosonsoy-Zakovat	0:0	Penalty. 3:2

== Second round ==
Pairs	Date	Note
Pairs	9 March	Note
Lokomotiv BFK (Toshkent) — [Toʻpalang (Sariosiyo)	1:2	
Kimyogar (Chirchiq) — Vobkent	1:6	
Mashal-2 (Muborak) — Samarqand-Dinamo	0:2	
Sho‘rchi-Lochin — Lokomotiv (Toshkent)	2:0	
NBU-Osiyo — Nasaf	1:2	
Soʻgʻdiyona Jizzax — Buxoro	0:0	Penalty. 5:6
Uz-DongJu Andijan) — Qizilqum (Zarafshon)	3:2	
Kattaqoʻrgʻon-Dinamo — Andijon	0:2	
Xorazm (Urganch) — Navbahor (Namangan)	0:6	
Zarafshon (Navoiy) — Sho‘rtan (G‘uzor)	1:4	
AGMK (Olmaliq) — Metallurg (Bekobod)	0:1	
	13 March	
Shaxrixon — Quruvchi (Toshkent)	1:3	

== Round of 16 ==
Pairings	Date	Note
Pairings	18 March	Note
Qizilqum (Zarafshan) – Sogdiana (Jizzakh)	1:0	
Bukhara – Mashal (Muborak)	4:3	
Almalyk – Nasaf (Qarshi)	1:1	Penalties. 6:7
Khorezm (Urgench) – Dinamo (Samarkand)	4:1	
Shurtan (Guzar) – Andijan	1:1	Penalties. 4:3
	27 March	
Dinamo 01 (Qarshi) – Bunyodkor (Tashkent)	0:2	
	5 June	
Neftchi (Fergana) – Metallurg (Bekabad)	5:0	
	11 June	
Navbahor (Namangan) – Pakhtakor (Tashkent)	0:3	

== Semi-finals ==
Pairings	1st Leg	2nd Leg
Pairings	26 July	30 July
Bunyodkor (Tashkent) – Nasaf (Qarshi)	3:0	2:0
Pakhtakor (Tashkent) – Neftchi (Fergana)	4:1	2:3

== Final ==
Final match	Date	Score
Bunyodkor (Tashkent) – Pakhtakor (Tashkent)	14 November	1:0
