= Aleksandr Khvostunov =

Uzbekistani footballer

Personal information
- Date of birth: 9 January 1974 (age 52)
- Place of birth: Qarshi, Uzbekistan
- Height: 1.76 m (5 ft 9 1/2 in)
- Position: Defender

Senior career*
Years	Team	Apps	(Gls)
1990–1993	Nasaf Qarshi		
1994–1995	Mash'al Mubarek		
1996–1997	Traktor Tashkent	54	(8)
1998–1999	Pakhtakor	53	(6)
2000	Krylia Sovetov Samara	0	(0)
2000–2001	Traktor Tashkent	33	(3)
2002	Lada Togliatti	13	(0)
2003–2004	Chornomorets Odesa	24	(0)
2004	→ Chornomorets-2 Odesa	3	(0)
2004	Zakarpattia Uzhgorod	1	(0)
2005	Traktor Tashkent	10	(0)
2005	Zhetysu	14	(2)
2006	Navbahor Namangan	22	(0)
2007–2010	Bunyodkor	70	(1)
2009	→ Dinamo Samarqand (loan)	14	(0)
2010	Dinamo Samarqand	12	(0)
2011	Qizilqum Zarafshon	12	(0)
2011–2012	Dinamo Samarqand	33	(0)

International career
1997–2004	Uzbekistan	49	(3)
- * Club domestic league appearances and goals

Aleksandr Khvostunov (born 9 January 1974) is an Uzbekistani former football defender.

== Playing career ==
=== Club ===
He played for Bunyodkor in 2007–2010. In July 2011 he joined FK Samarqand-Dinamo before playing in Qizilqum Zarafshon. In 2013, he joined NBU Osiyo, club playing in Uzbekistan First League.

=== National team ===
He earned 49 caps scoring 3 goals for the national team between 1997 and 2004.

== Career statistics ==
=== International goals ===
#	Date	Venue	Opponent	Score	Result	Competition
1.	19 November 1998	Salt Lake Stadium, Kolkata, West Bengal, India	India	0–4	Win	Friendly
2.	3 December 1998	700th Anniversary Stadium, Chiang Mai, Thailand	Kuwait	3–3	Draw	1998 Asian Games qual.
3.	2 April 2003	Dinamo Stadium, Minsk, Belarus	Belarus	2–2	Draw	Friendly
Correct as of 2 January 2017

== Honours ==
Pakhtakor

- Uzbek League (1): 1998

Bunyodkor

- Uzbek League (3): 2008, 2009, 2010
- Uzbek Cup (1): 2010
