= Wissam Zaki =

Iraqi footballer

Personal information
- Date of birth: 5 August 1986 (age 40)
- Place of birth: Iraq
- Height: 1.74 m (5 ft 9 in)
- Position: Winger

Youth career
- Al-Estiqlal
- Al-Shorta

Senior career*
Years	Team	Apps	(Gls)
2002–2004	Al-Shorta		
2004–2006	Al-Zawraa		
2006–2010	Erbil		
2010–2013	Duhok		
2013–2014	Al-Naft		
2014–2015	Al-Talaba		

International career
2005–2006	Iraq	14	(0)
- * Club domestic league appearances and goals

Wissam Zaki (Arabic: وسام زكي; born 5 August 1986) is an Iraqi former professional footballer who played as a winger.

== Honours ==
Iraq

- 2005 West Asian Games Gold medallist.
