= Yannis Mandzukas =

Uzbekistani footballer (born 1984)

Personal information
- Full name: Yannis Vladimirovich Mandzukas
- Date of birth: 8 April 1984 (age 42)
- Place of birth: Chirchiq, Uzbek SSR, Soviet Union
- Height: 1.84 m (6 ft 0 in)
- Position: Midfielder

Youth career
- 2001–2003: Kimyogar Chirchiq

Senior career*
Years	Team	Apps	(Gls)
2001–2003	Kimyogar Chirchiq	4	(2)
2004	MTZ-RIPO Minsk	1	(0)
2005–2006	Kimyogar Chirchiq		(18)
2007–2008	Bunyodkor	24	(2)
2008–2010	Lokomotiv Tashkent	51	(4)
2010–2011	Bunyodkor	17	(1)
2012	Mash'al Mubarek	13	(0)
2013	Qizilqum Zarafshon	12	(4)

International career
2007	Uzbekistan	4	(1)
- * Club domestic league appearances and goals

Yannis Vladimirovich Mandzukas (Russian: Яннис Владимирович Мандзукас, Greek: Γιάννης Βλαδιμίροβιτς Μαντζουκάς; born 8 April 1984) is an Uzbekistani former professional footballer who played as a midfielder.

== Career ==
Born in Chirchiq, Mandzukas began his football career with Uzbek second division side Kimyogar Chirchiq. He had a brief spell in the Belarusian Premier League with FC MTZ-RIPO Minsk, before joining to Uzbek League side FC Bunyodkor.

== Career statistics ==
=== Club ===
As of match played 9 December 2007

Appearances and goals by club, season and competition
Club	Season	League			National Cup		Continental		Total	
Club	Season	Division	Apps	Goals	Apps	Goals	Apps	Goals	Apps	Goals
Bunyodkor	2007	Uzbek League	11	0	4	0	-		15	0
Career total			11	0	4	0	-	-	15	0

=== International ===
Uzbekistan national team
Year	Apps	Goals
2007	4	1
Total	4	1

Statistics accurate as of match played 27 March 2007

As of 9 March 2007

#	Date	Venue	Opponent	Score	Result	Competition	Ref
1.	9 March 2007	Kazhymukan Munaitpasov Stadium, Shymkent, Kazakhstan	Kyrgyzstan	4–0	6–0	Friendly	

== Honours ==
Bunyodkor

- Uzbek League: 2010, 2011
- Uzbekistan Cup: 2010
