= Witaliý Alikperow =

Turkmenistan footballer

Personal information
- Date of birth: 1 August 1978 (age 48)
- Place of birth: Turkmen SSR, Soviet Union
- Height: 1.82 m (6 ft 0 in)
- Position: Midfielder

Senior career*
Years	Team	Apps	(Gls)
1998–1999	Merw		
2000	Nisa Asgabat		
2002	Garagum Türkmenabat		
2003–2005	Nebitçi Balkanabat		
2006	Nasaf Qarshi	25	(5)
2007	Bunyodkor	11	(0)
2008–	Merw		

International career
2004–2008	Turkmenistan	11	(0)
- * Club domestic league appearances and goals

Witaliý Alikperow is a Turkmenistani football midfielder who played for Turkmenistan in the 2004 Asian Cup. He also played for Merw, Nisa Asgabat, Garagum Türkmenabat, Nebitçi Balkanabat, Nasaf Qarshi and Bunyodkor.

== Career statistics ==
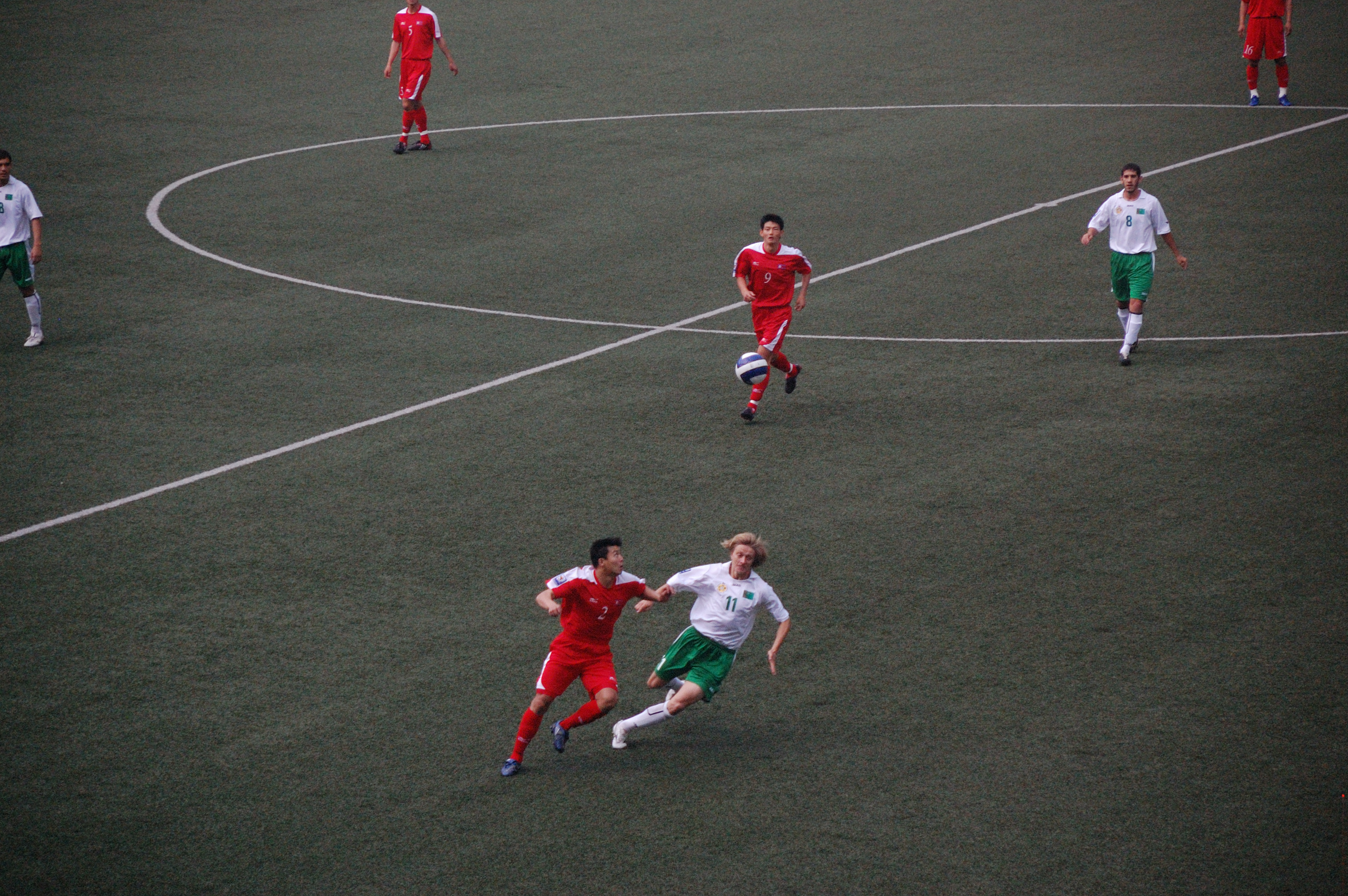
Alikperow (No. 8) in a game for the Turkmenistan national team against the DPR Korea in Pyongyang

=== Club ===
As of match played 9 December 2007

Appearances and goals by club, season and competition
Club	Season	League			National Cup		Continental		Total	
Club	Season	Division	Apps	Goals	Apps	Goals	Apps	Goals	Apps	Goals
Bunyodkor	2007	Uzbek League	11	0	4	0	-		15	0
Career total			11	0	4	0	-	-	15	0

=== International ===
Turkmenistan national team
Year	Apps	Goals
2000	1	0
2001	0	0
2002	0	0
2003	0	0
2004	3	0
2005	0	0
2006	0	0
2007	0	0
2008	7	0
Total	11	0

Statistics accurate as of match played 3 August 2008
