= Abdumajid Toirov =

Uzbekistani footballer

Personal information
- Full name: Abdumajid Toirov
- Date of birth: 5 August 1974 (age 52)
- Place of birth: Uzbekistan
- Height: 1.80 m (5 ft 11 in)
- Position: Defender

Senior career*
| Years | Team | Apps | (Gls) |
| 1996–1999 | Surkhon Termez | 60 | (2) |
| 2000–2005 | Neftchi Fergana | 165 | (12) |
| 2006 | Topalang Sariosiyo | 27 | (4) |
| 2007 | Kuruvchi | 22 | (0) |
| 2008 | OTMK Olmaliq | 28 | (1) |
| 2009 | Xorazm Urganch | 29 | (0) |
| 2010 | Andijon | 20 | (0) |
| 2011–2013 | Navbahor Namangan | 56 | (1) |

International career
| 2000 | Uzbekistan | 4 | (0) |
- * Club domestic league appearances and goals as of 18 February 2019

Abdumajid Toirov (born 5 August 1974) is a retired Uzbekistan international footballer, who played as a defender.

== Career statistics ==
=== International ===
Uzbekistan national team
| Year | Apps | Goals |
|---|---|---|
| 2000 | 4 | 0 |
| Total | 4 | 0 |

As of match played 17 October 2000.
