= Myrat Hamraýew =

Turkmenistani footballer (born 1983)

Personal information
- Date of birth: 14 May 1983 (age 43)
- Place of birth: Turkmen SSR, USSR
- Position: Defender

Team information
- Current team: Ahal
- Number: 15

Senior career*
Years	Team	Apps	(Gls)
2004–2005	Nisa Aşgabat		
2005	Asudalyk		
2005–2006	Navbahor Namangan		
2007–2008	FK Dinamo Samarqand		
2009	Olmaliq		
2009–2010	Karvan Yevlax	12	(0)
2010–2011	Olmaliq	33	(1)
2012–2014	Balkan		
2015	Ahal		
2016–2017	Balkan		
2018–	Ahal		

International career^{‡}
2004–2014	Turkmenistan	7	(0)
- * Club domestic league appearances and goals as of 8 February 2015 ‡ National team caps and goals as of 8 February 2015

Myrat Hamraýew (born 14 May 1983) is a Turkmen footballer who plays for Turkmen club FC Ahal. He was part of the Turkmenistan national team from 2004.

== Club career ==
In 2013 with FC Balkan he won the 2013 AFC President's Cup in Malaysia.

In 2015, he moved to the FC Ahal.
