= Pavel Solomin =

Uzbekistani footballer

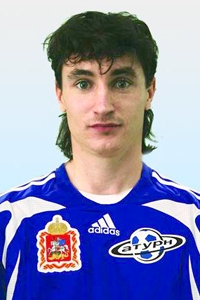

Personal information
- Date of birth: 15 June 1982 (age 44)
- Place of birth: Tashkent, Soviet Union
- Height: 1.76 m (5 ft 9 in)
- Position: Striker

Senior career*
Years	Team	Apps	(Gls)
2003–2005	Traktor Tashkent	53	(23)
2005	Pakhtakor Tashkent	12	(6)
2006–2007	Traktor Tashkent	31	(21)
2007	Saturn Moscow Oblast	21	(8)
2008	Navbahor Namangan	25	(7)
2009	Lokomotiv Tashkent	23	(2)
2010	Sriwijaya	12	(5)
2010–2011	Putra Samarinda	15	(2)
2012	Mash'al Mubarek	18	(7)
2013	Shurtan Guzar	20	(7)
2014	Putra Samarinda	10	(2)
2015–2016	Obod	10	(12)
Total		250	(102)

International career
2006–2008	Uzbekistan	15	(2)
- * Club domestic league appearances and goals

Pavel Pavlovich Solomin (Russian: Павел Павлович Соломин, born 15 June 1982) is a former Uzbekistani footballer. The last time he played for Obod as a striker. Currently he coaches a football team of Webster University in Tashkent.

== Career ==
After scoring 21 goals in the Uzbek League he tried in a better league like the Russian Premier League, but strangely he only played 6 minutes with his team FC Saturn Moscow Oblast in the whole competition.

He signed with Indonesian side Sriwijaya on 21 February 2010. He scored his first goal in Indonesia against Bontang FC. He scored the winning goal of SFC against Arema Malang in the Piala Indonesia final.

In winter 2011-12 he was on trial in Lokomotiv Tashkent, but started 2012 season in the club Travmaychi Tashkent, in Uzbekistan Second League, championship of Tashkent.

In August 2012 he signed a contract with Mash'al. In February 2012 he moved to Shurtan Guzar.

=== International ===
Solomin has made 15 appearances for the Uzbekistan national football team, scoring twice.

=== Coaching career ===
On May 19, 2021, he signed a contract with Webster University in Tashkent to lead the football club of.

== Career statistics ==
=== International ===
Goals for Senior National team

No	Date	Venue	Opponent	Score	Result	Competition
1	22 July 2007	Jakarta, Indonesia	Saudi Arabia	2-1	Lost	2007 AFC Asian Cup
2	24 December 2007	Bangkok, Thailand	North Korea	2-2	Draw	Friendly

== Honours ==
=== Club ===
Sriwijaya

- Piala Indonesia: 2010

=== Individual ===
- Uzbek League Top Scorer: 2006 (21 goals)
