= Timur Yafarov =

Uzbekistani footballer

Personal information
- Full name: Timur Yafarov
- Date of birth: 30 November 1986 (age 39)
- Place of birth: Uzbekistan
- Position: Midfielder

Senior career*
Years	Team	Apps	(Gls)
2004–2006	Lokomotiv Tashkent		
2007	Kuruvchi	25	(0)
2009	Metallurg Bekabad		
2009–2010	Andijon		
2011	Mash'al Mubarek	10	(0)
2012	Qizilqum Zarafshon		
2012	Olmaliq	1	(0)
2013	Qizilqum Zarafshon	9	(0)
2013–2014	Navbahor Namangan	11	(0)
2015–2016	Oqtepa		

International career^{‡}
2007	Uzbekistan	1	(1)
- * Club domestic league appearances and goals as of 18 February 2019 ‡ National team caps and goals as of 18 February 2019

Timur Yafarov (born 30 November 1986) is a former Uzbekistan international footballer who played as a midfielder.

== Career statistics ==
=== International ===
Uzbekistan national team
Year	Apps	Goals
2007	1	1
Total	1	1

As of match played 24 December 2007.
