= 2003 Uzbek League =

Uzbek League
- Season: 2003
- Champions: Pakhtakor Tashkent

The 2003 Uzbek League season was the 12th edition of top level football in Uzbekistan since independence from the Soviet Union in 1992.

== Overview ==
It was contested by 16 teams, and Pakhtakor Tashkent won the championship.

== League standings ==
Pos	Team	Pld	W	D	L	GF	GA	GD	Pts
1	Pakhtakor Tashkent (C)	30	25	2	3	82	23	+59	77
2	Neftchi Farg'ona	30	23	2	5	80	35	+45	71
3	Navbahor Namangan	30	19	6	5	66	28	+38	63
4	Nasaf Qarshi	30	19	3	8	58	40	+18	60
5	Qizilqum Zarafshon	30	17	4	9	59	33	+26	55
6	Mash'al Mubarek	30	13	5	12	48	40	+8	44
7	Andijan	30	11	6	13	38	36	+2	39
8	Dinamo Samarqand	30	11	2	17	40	46	−6	35
9	Surkhon Termez	30	10	4	16	32	56	−24	34
10	FK Qo'qon	30	11	0	19	47	67	−20	33
11	Do'stlik Toshkent	30	10	3	17	40	59	−19	33
12	Buxoro	30	10	2	18	48	56	−8	32
13	Metalourg Bekabad	30	9	5	16	36	69	−33	32
14	Traktor Tashkent	30	9	4	17	44	62	−18	31
15	Sementchi Kuvasoy (R)	30	8	7	15	39	64	−25	31
16	Guliston (R)	30	6	3	21	22	65	−43	21

Source: RSSSF
(C) Champions; (R) Relegated
