= 2008 Uzbek League =

Uzbek League season

Uzbek League
- Season: 2008
- Champions: Bunyodkor
- Relegated: FK Buxoro; Uz-Dong-Ju
- AFC Champions League: Bunyodkor; Pakhtakor
- AFC Cup: Neftchi Farg'ona
- Top goalscorer: Server Djeparov; 19 goals

The 2008 Uzbek League season was the 17th edition of top level football in Uzbekistan since independence from the Soviet Union in 1992.

== Overview ==
It was contested by 16 teams, and Bunyodkor won the championship. Traktor Tashkent and Tupalang Sariosiyo withdrew of 2008 season participation because of financial problems. They were replaced by and OTMK Olmaliq, a team from First League, and Metallurg Bekabad which as of 2008 season end, was originally relegated to First League, remained in top division.

Sogdiana Jizzakh and Uz-Dong-Joo promoted from First League. Vobkent FK was relegated in 2007 season.

== League table ==
Pos	Team	Pld	W	D	L	GF	GA	GD	Pts	Qualification or relegation
1	Bunyodkor	30	25	4	1	75	13	+62	79	2009 AFC Champions League Group stage
2	Pakhtakor	30	23	5	2	64	14	+50	74	2009 AFC Champions League Group stage
3	Neftchi Farg'ona	30	18	6	6	42	25	+17	60	
4	Mash'al Mubarek	30	15	7	8	38	26	+12	52	
5	FK Andijan	30	13	7	10	35	28	+7	46	
6	FK Samarqand-Dinamo	30	12	6	12	40	30	+10	42	
7	Metallurg Bekabad	30	12	6	12	28	34	−6	42	
8	Lokomotiv Tashkent	30	11	4	15	41	38	+3	37	
9	Nasaf Qarshi	30	10	5	15	28	36	−8	35	
10	Olmaliq FK	30	8	9	13	29	34	−5	33	
11	Sogdiana Jizzakh	30	8	9	13	32	48	−16	33	
12	FC Shurtan Guzar	30	9	6	15	22	44	−22	33	
13	Navbahor Namangan	30	7	11	12	28	39	−11	32	
14	Qizilqum Zarafshon	30	9	5	16	27	44	−17	32	
15	FK Buxoro (R)	30	7	5	18	25	44	−19	26	Relegation to Lower Division
16	Uz-Dong-Joo (R)	30	2	7	21	17	65	−48	13	Relegation to Lower Division

Updated to match(es) played on 24 November 2008. Source: Uzbekistan Professional Football League
Rules for classification: 1) points; 2) goal difference; 3) number of goals scored.
(R) Relegated

== Season statistics ==
=== Top goalscorers ===
Rank	Player	Club	Goals
1	(Uzbekistan) Server Djeparov	Bunyodkor	19 (7)
2	(Uzbekistan) Zayniddin Tadjiyev	Pakhtakor	17 (1)
3	(Uzbekistan) Shakhboz Erkinov	Sogdiana	13 (2)
3	(Uzbekistan) Shuhrat Mirkholdirshoev	Navbahor	13 (4)
5	(Uzbekistan) Anvar Soliev	Bunyodkor	12
5	(Uzbekistan) Anvar Berdiev	Neftchi	12 (2)
5	(Uzbekistan) Alexander Geynrikh	Pakhtakor	12 (7)
8	(Uzbekistan) Ilyos Kurbonov	Dinamo	11
8	(Georgia (country)) Levan Mdivnishvili	Andijan	11
10	(Uzbekistan) Farhod Tadjiyev	Dinamo	10
10	(Uzbekistan) Odil Ahmedov	Pakhtakor	10 (3)

Last updated: 23 November 2008
