= Pakhtakor-2 =

FC Pakhtakor-2
- Nickname(s): The Lions
- Founded: 2012
- Ground: Pakhtakor Stadium
- Capacity: 35,000
- Owner: (Uzbekistan) Abduqahhor Tuhtaev
- Manager: Ilhom Mo'minjonov
- League: Uzbekistan First League
- Website: www.pakhtakor.uz
Home colours	Away colours

FC Pakhtakor-2 (Uzbek: "Paxtakor-2" futbol klubi, Russian: Футбольный клуб Пахтакор-2) is an Uzbek professional football club, based in the capital Tashkent. Currently, it plays in the Uzbekistan First League. It is a farm club of FC Pakhtakor.

== History ==
Pakhtakor-2 is feeder of first team. In 2012 Pakhtakor-2 plays in First League and Uzbek Cup. On 3 April 2012 club was renamed to Pakhtakor-2 Chilanzar.

On 24 July 2012, club head coach Numon Khasanov resigned his position and was appointed as head coach of Pakhtakor Youth team. A new head coach of Pakhtakor-2-Chilanzar became Ilhom Mo'minjonov who worked before as head coach at NBU Osiyo.

In 2014 club was renamed to it old name Pakhtakor-2.

== Managerial history ==
Name	Nat	Period
Numon Khasanov	(Uzbekistan)	2012
Ilhom Mo'minjonov	(Uzbekistan)	2012–
