= Victor Karpenko =

Uzbekistani footballer

Personal information
- Full name: Victor Aleksandrovich Karpenko
- Date of birth: 7 September 1977 (age 49)
- Place of birth: Tashkent, Uzbek SSR, Soviet Union
- Height: 1.80 m (5 ft 11 in)
- Position: Midfielder

Senior career*
Years	Team	Apps	(Gls)
1997–1998	Buxoro	47	(5)
1999	Qizilqum Zarafshon	?	(?)
2000–2001	Shinnik Yaroslavl	35	(6)
2002	Lokomotiv Chita	31	(14)
2003–2004	Shinnik Yaroslavl	36	(7)
2004	Sokol Saratov	15	(0)
2005–2006	Kairat	39	(11)
2007–2012	Bunyodkor	202	(38)
2013–2014	Lokomotiv Tashkent	45	(5)
2015	Shurtan Guzar	14	(5)
2015–2016	Bunyodkor	13	(1)

International career^{‡}
2003–2014	Uzbekistan	61	(4)

Managerial career
- 2022: FC Bunyodkor (caretaker)
- * Club domestic league appearances and goals as of 8 February 2016 ‡ National team caps and goals as of 29 May 2014

Victor Aleksandrovich Karpenko (Russian: Виктор Александрович Карпенко; born 7 September 1977) is a retired Uzbekistani professional football midfielder, and current coach of FC Bunyodkor.

== Career ==
=== Club ===
Karpenko began his playing career with FK Buxoro in 1997, before moving to Qizilqum Zarafshon in 1999.

==== Bunyodkor ====
Before joining Bunyodkor in 2007, Karpenko played for several Russian football clubs and in 2005–06 played for FC Kairat. He became one of the leading players and captain of Bunyodkor. Karpenko won 4 championship titles and 3 Uzbek Cups. In 5 seasons he appeared in 202 matches and scored 38 goals for Bunyodkor.

==== Lokomotiv Tashkent ====
On 26 January 2013 he signed a contract with Lokomotiv Tashkent.

=== International ===
Karpenko made his debut in a friendly against Belarus on 2 April 2003. Since his debut in 2003 Karpenko has been capped in 61 matches and has scored 4 goals for the full Uzbekistan national football team; this includes seven qualifying matches for the 2006 FIFA World Cup and seven qualifying matches for the 2010 FIFA World Cup. On 29 May 2014 he played his farewell match for the national team in a friendly against Oman.

=== Coaching ===
After retiring from football Karpenko became a coach at FC Bunyodkor.

== Honours ==
Bunyodkor

- Uzbek League: 2008, 2009, 2010, 2011
- Uzbek Cup: 2008, 2010, 2012

Lokomotiv

- Uzbek Cup: 2014
- Uzbek League runner-up: 2013
