= Marsel Idiatullin =

Uzbekistani footballer

Personal information
- Date of birth: 28 December 1977 (age 48)
- Place of birth: Uzbek SSR, Soviet Union
- Position: Forward

Team information
- Current team: Lokomotiv Tashkent Youth academy (coach)

Senior career*
Years	Team	Apps	(Gls)
2002–2003	Qizilqum Zarafshon	59	(37)
2004–2008	Lokomotiv Tashkent	128	(42)
2009	Lokomotiv Tashkent		
2009	Sogdiana Jizzakh		
2010	Durmon-Sport		

Managerial career
- 2012–: Lokomotiv Tashkent Academy (coach)
- * Club domestic league appearances and goals

Marsel Idiatullin (born 28 December 1977), is a retired Uzbek professional footballer and coach at Lokomotiv Tashkent Academy.

== Career ==
=== Qizilqum Zarafshon ===
In 2002-2003, Idiatullin played for Qizilqum Zarafshon. Qizilqum finished the 2002 season in third place and Idiatullin scored 21 goals for the club. In the 2003 season he became top scorer of Uzbek League, scoring 26 goals.

=== Lokomotiv Tashkent ===
He joined Lokomotiv Tashkent in 2004 and played 5 seasons for the club. He is currently the player with most caps and all-time top scorer of Lokomotiv with 42 goals.

He is member of the Gennadi Krasnitsky club of Uzbek top scorers with 101 goals (89 in Uzbek League and 12 in Cup matches).

=== Sogdiana Jizzakh ===
In August 2009 he left Lokomotiv Tashkent and moved to Sogdiana Jizzakh.

=== Durmon-Sport ===
During the 2010 season he played for Durmon-Sport in First League.

== Honours ==
=== Club ===
- Uzbek League 3rd: 2002

=== Individual ===
- Uzbek League Top Scorer: 2003
