= Vyacheslav Ponomarev (footballer) =

Uzbekistani footballer

Personal information
- Date of birth: 2 January 1978 (age 48)
- Place of birth: Namangan, Uzbek SSR

Team information
- Current team: FK Buxoro
- Number: 14

Senior career*
Years	Team	Apps	(Gls)
1996–1998	Navbahor Namangan	7	(1)
1998–2000	Dustlik	55	(3)
2001	Pakhtakor	18	(2)
2002	Metallurg Bekabad	29	(8)
2003	Qizilqum Zarafshon	26	(7)
2004–2007	Pakhtakor	86	(10)
2007–2008	Bunyodkor	18	(0)
2009–2013	Shurtan Guzar	84	(1)
2013–2014	Neftchi Farg'ona	29	(0)
2015–	Bukhoro	1	(0)

International career^{‡}
2000	Uzbekistan	1	(0)
- * Club domestic league appearances and goals as of 19 April 2015 ‡ National team caps and goals as of 29 February 2000

Vyacheslav Ponomarev (born 2 January 1978) is an Uzbek professional football midfielder. Her currently plays for FK Buxoro in the Uzbek League.

== Career ==
Ponomarev started his football career in the Chirchik children and youth's sport school. He has played football for several clubs in the Uzbek League, including Navbahor Namangan from 1996 to 1998, Dustlik from 1998 to 2000, Pakhtakor in 2001, Metallurg Bekabad in 2002, Qizilqum Zarafshon in 2003, Pakhtakor again in 2004–2007, Kuruvchi from 2007 to 2008. Most recently, he joined Shurtan Guzar in 2009.

== International career ==
Ponomarev has made one appearance for the Uzbekistan national football team in a friendly match against Mongolia on 29 February 2000. He was recalled for national team in 2010, but did not appear in a qualifying match for the 2010 FIFA World Cup against Lebanon.
