= Farhod Tadjiyev =

Uzbekistani footballer

Personal information
- Full name: Farhod Tadjiyev
- Date of birth: 9 April 1986 (age 40)
- Place of birth: Tashkent, Soviet Union
- Height: 1.87 m (6 ft 2 in)
- Position: Striker

Team information
- Current team: Dinamo Samarqand
- Number: 50

Senior career*
Years	Team	Apps	(Gls)
2006	Taraz	18	(2)
2007–2009	Pakhtakor Tashkent	37	(19)
2010	Tianjin Teda	4	(0)
2010–2012	Pakhtakor Tashkent	21	(3)
2012	Shurtan Guzar	13	(4)
2013–2014	Lokomotiv Tashkent	35	(30)
2015	T-Team FC	30	(40)
2016	Olmaliq FK	12	(6)
2017	T-Team	12	(5)
2017–	Dinamo Samarqand	7	(0)

International career
2008–2014	Uzbekistan	20	(7)
- * Club domestic league appearances and goals as of 19 October 2017

Farhod Tadjiyev (Uzbek Cyrillic: Фарход Тожиев or Farhod Tojiyev; born 9 April 1986) is an Uzbekistani footballer who plays as a striker who plays for FC Dinamo Samarqand. His name means happiness in Persian. He is the younger brother of Kamoliddin Tajiev and Zaynitdin Tadjiyev.

== Club career ==
He joined Tianjin Teda in February 2010, after Tianjin Teda released his elder brother Zaynitdin Tadjiyev. In 2011–12 he played in Pakhtakor Tashkent. In summer 2012 he moved to Shurtan Guzar.

On 27 January 2013 he signed a contract with Lokomotiv Tashkent. In 2013, he scored 17 goals in 13 first League matches, leading goalscorer list far ahead. After injury he could not play any match in the season. Tadjiyev scored 13 goals in 2014 League for Lokomotiv and became one of the League goalscorers. He was the best Lokomotiv goalscorer in 2013–14 seasons.

He signed a contract with Malaysian T-Team on 24 November 2014. On 28 February 2015 in Malaysia FA Cup Round of 32 match against ATM Tadjiev scored two goals in the 101st and 113th minutes in a 3–0 victory.

On 28 September 2016, Farhod signed for Machine Sazi F.C. to begin a new chapter in his career in Iran's Persian Gulf Pro League.

== International career ==
Tadjiyev made five appearances for the Uzbekistan national football team in the 2010 FIFA World Cup qualifying rounds.

He was called to Uzbekistan team to play in the 2014 FIFA World Cup qualification match against Lebanon on 26 March 2013.

Farhod's hat-trick against Qatar in the 2014 FIFA World Cup Qualification added to his popularity among Uzbek football fans and gained him much recognition on Asia's international stage.

== Career statistics ==
=== Goals for Senior National Team ===
#	Date	Venue	Opponent	Score	Result	Competition
1	22 March 2008	Tashkent, Uzbekistan	Jordan	4–1	Won	Friendly
2	28 January 2009	Sharjah, United Arab Emirates	United Arab Emirates	1–0	Won	2011 AFC Asian Cup qualification
3–5	28 March 2009	Tashkent, Uzbekistan	Qatar	4–0	Won	2010 FIFA World Cup qualification

== Honours ==
=== Club ===
Pakhtakor

- Uzbek League (1): 2007
- Uzbek League runner-up (2): 2008, 2009
- Uzbek Cup (2): 2009, 2011
- CIS Cup (1): 2007

Tianjin Teda

- Chinese Super League runner-up (1): 2010

Lokomotiv

- Uzbek League runner-up (2): 2013, 2014
- Uzbek Cup (1): 2014

=== Individual ===
- Lokomotiv best goalscorer: 2013, 2014
