= Ilkhom Muminjonov =

Uzbekistani footballer

Ilhom Moʻminjonov
Personal information
- Date of birth: 21 January 1979 (age 47)
- Place of birth: Tashkent, Uzbekistan
- Height: 1.84 m (6 ft 0 in)
- Position: Striker

Senior career*
Years	Team	Apps	(Gls)
1998–2002	Traktor Tashkent	?	(?)
2003	Navbahor Namangan	14	(4)
2004–2005	Traktor Tashkent	50	(19)
2006–2007	Lokomotiv Tashkent	?	(15)
2007–2009	Bunyodkor	19	(16)

International career
2001–2007	Uzbekistan	3	(0)

Managerial career
- 2009–2010: Bunyodkor academy
- 2011–2012: NBU Osiyo
- 2012–2013: Pakhtakor-2 Chilanzar
- 2014–2016: Pakhtakor Youth
- 2016–2018: Navbahor Namangan
- * Club domestic league appearances and goals

Ilhom Moʻminjonov, also spelt Ilkhom Muminjonov (Uzbek: Ilhom Moʻminjonov, Илҳом Мўминжонов) (born 21 January 1979 in Tashkent) is a former Uzbek footballer.

== Club career ==
He scored three goals en route to a 3–2 Uzbek cup final defeat to Pakhtakor in 2004 where he came on at half-time. In 2007, he was awarded the Uzbek League Top Scorer award with 21 goals; 5 for Lokomotiv Tashkent and the remaining 16 for Kuruvchi (renamed Bunyodkor in 2008) who purchased him during the season. Mo'minjonov scored 102 goals in Uzbek League and Uzbek Cup matches, entering the Gennadi Krasnitsky club.

== Managing career ==
He retired from football in 2009, and is now working within the Bunyodkor academy.. In 2011, he became head coach of Tashkent football club NBU Osiyo in First League.

On 24 July 2012, Mo'minjonov left NBU Osiyo and became a new head coach of Pakhtakor-2 Chilanzar. In January 2014 Mo'minjonov was appointed as head coach for Pakhtakor Youth team which plays in Uzbek Youth League. On 6 November 2016 he was named as head coach of Navbahor Namangan replacing Ravshan Bozorov at this position.

== National team ==
He has represented Uzbekistan three times, all substitute appearances. His first two caps came in 2001, after a fine season with Traktor Tashkent where he scored 18 times. He gained his last cap in 2007.

== Honours ==
=== Club ===
- Uzbek League runner-up: 2007

=== Individual ===
- Uzbek League Top Scorer: 2007 (21 goals)
