= Vobkent FK =

- Full name: Vobkent FK
- Founded: 2002
- Dissolved: 2008
- Ground: Bukhara, Uzbekistan
- Capacity: 7,000
- League: Uzbek League
Home colours	Away colours

Vobkent FK was an Uzbekistani football club based in Bukhara. The club used to play in the top division in Uzbek football, and dissolved in 2008 after the relegation of the Uzbek League.
