= Anvarjon Soliev =

Uzbekistani association footballer and coach

Personal information
- Full name: Anvarjon Ahmadjonovich Soliev
- Date of birth: 5 February 1978 (age 48)
- Place of birth: Namangan, Uzbek SSR, Soviet Union
- Height: 1.85 m (6 ft 1 in)
- Position: Striker

Team information
- Current team: Navbahor (assistant coach)

Senior career*
Years	Team	Apps	(Gls)
1996–2000	Navbahor Namangan	85	(29)
2001–2007	Pakhtakor Tashkent	115	(60)
2008–2010	Bunyodkor	52	(22)
2010	→ Nasaf Qarshi (on loan)	11	(3)
2011–2013	Bunyodkor	44	(15)
2013–2016	Pakhtakor Tashkent	42	(6)

International career^{‡}
2001–2009	Uzbekistan	48	(8)

Managerial career
- 2016: Pakhtakor-2 (assistant)
- 2016–: Navbahor Namangan (assistant)
- * Club domestic league appearances and goals as of 23 November 2016 ‡ National team caps and goals as of 10 November 2013

Anvarjon Soliev (born 5 February 1978) is a retired Uzbekistani football striker and football coach.

== Early life ==
He was born in Turakurgan of Namangan region.

== Career ==
=== Navbahor Namangan ===
Firstly he played in Yoshlik football team. Then he continued in Navbahor Namangan. In 1998, he won with Navbahor Uzbek Cup. In 2001, he moved to Pakhtakor.

=== Pakhtakor ===
Soliev played seven seasons for Pakhtakor, after he moved in 2008 to another rising capital club Kuruvchi. With Pakhtakor he won 6 times champion of Uzbekistan and 5 Uzbek Cup titles, before leaving the club.

=== Bunyodkor ===
In his first season for Bunyodkor Soliev scored 12 goals in league matches. He is currently top scorer of the club in Uzbek League with 46 goals (as of 21 November 2012), followed by Rivaldo and Server Djeparov. With 16 goals Soliev is one of the leading all-time topscorers of AFC Champions League, having scored eight of them for Bunyodkor.

On 18 July 2013 he moved back to Pakhtakor Tashkent.

As of the end of the 2015 Uzbek League season he won his eighth championship title with Pakhtakor. With 12 Uzbek League championships and nine Uzbek Cups, Soliev is the all-time most honoured player among Uzbekistani players. Soliev won his Uzbekistan champion titles playing for three clubs.

He is a member of Gennadi Krasnitsky club of Uzbek top scorers with over 100 goals, scoring (as of 22 November 2015) 228 goals in the league, cup, AFC Champions League and in official games for the national team.

== Managing career ==
In the middle of 2016 he retired as a player and started his managing career, as assistant coach in Pakhtakor-2. In December 2016 he joined the Navbahor Namangan coaching staff.

== International ==
He played for the Uzbekistan national football team, and played 48 matches and scored eight goals after his debut in 2001.

== Honours ==
=== Club ===
Navbahor

- Uzbek League (1): 1996
- Uzbek Cup (1): 1998

Pakhtakor

- Uzbek League (8): 2002, 2003, 2004, 2005, 2006, 2007, 2014, 2015
- Uzbek Cup (6): 2002, 2003, 2004, 2005, 2006, 2007
- CIS cup: 2007
- AFC Champions League semi-final (2): 2003, 2004

Bunyodkor

- Uzbek League (3): 2008, 2009, 2011
- Uzbek Cup (2): 2008, 2012
- AFC Champions League semi-final (2): 2008, 2012

=== Individual ===
- Uzbekistan Player of the Year 3rd: 2005
- Uzbek League Top Scorer: 2005 (29 goals)
- Gennadi Krasnitsky club: 228 goals (as of 22 November 2015)

== Player statistics ==
=== Goals for Senior National Team ===
#	Date	Venue	Opponent	Score	Result	Competition
1	20 August 2003	Riga, Latvia	Latvia	0–3	Won	Friendly
2	6 November 2003	Tashkent, Uzbekistan	Hong Kong	4–1	Won	2004 AFC Asian Cup qualification
3	18 February 2004	Tashkent, Uzbekistan	Iraq	1–1	Draw	2006 FIFA World Cup qualification
4	9 February 2005	Tashkent, Uzbekistan	Saudi Arabia	1–1	Draw	2006 FIFA World Cup qualification
5	17 August 2005	Tashkent, Uzbekistan	Kuwait	3–2	Won	2006 FIFA World Cup qualification
6	16 August 2006	Tashkent, Uzbekistan	Hong Kong	2–2	Draw	2007 AFC Asian Cup qualification
7	9 March 2007	Shymkent, Kazakhstan	Kyrgyzstan	6–0	Won	Friendly
8	28 March 2009	Tashkent, Uzbekistan	Qatar	4–0	Won	2010 FIFA World Cup qualification
