= Traktor Tashkent =

- Full name: Traktor Tashkent
- Founded: 1968
- Dissolved: 2007
- Ground: Traktor Tashkent Stadium; Tashkent, Uzbekistan
- Capacity: 6,400
- League: Uzbekistan 2nd division
Home colours	Away colours

Traktor Tashkent was an Uzbekistani football club based in Tashkent. Formally a top division team in Uzbekistani football. However they were dissolved in 2007.

== Achievements ==
- SSR Uzbekistan League
  - Winners (1): 1986
- SSR Uzbekistan Cup
  - Winners (1): 1975

== Club problems ==
In the past, the club was very famous and powerful but when the club couldn't pay for the Oliy Liga it was relegated to the First Division. They could not pay the players due to an unpopular sponsorship deal. These problems led to the club's demise.
