= 2009 FC Bunyodkor season =

FC Bunyodkor
2009 season
- Manager: Amet Memet (until 15 March); Hikmat Irgashev (15 March-9 June); Luiz Felipe Scolari (from 9 June)
- Uzbek League: 1st
- Uzbekistan Cup: Runners-up
- Champions League: Quarterfinal vs Pohang Steelers
- Top goalscorer: League: Rivaldo (20); All: Rivaldo; Anvar Soliev (22)
Home colours	Away colours

The 2009 FC Bunyodkor season was the 3rd season in the Uzbek League in Uzbekistan. Bunyodkor competed in Uzbek League, Uzbekistani Cup and AFC Champions League tournaments.

== Squad ==
As of match played 12 November 2009

No.	Name	Nationality	Position	Date of birth (age)	Signed from	Signed in	Contract ends	Apps.	Goals
Goalkeepers
1	Ignatiy Nesterov	(Uzbekistan)	GK	20 June 1983 (aged 26)	Pakhtakor Tashkent	2009		17	0
12	Murod Zukhurov	(Uzbekistan)	GK	23 February 1983 (aged 26)	Navbahor Namangan	2008		31+	0
25	Pavel Bugalo	(Uzbekistan)	GK	21 August 1974 (aged 35)	Ordabasy	2007		66+	0
32	Mukhiddin Khudoyorov	(Uzbekistan)	GK	5 November 1990 (aged 19)	Youth Team	2007		0	0
Defenders
2	Bakhtiyor Ashurmatov	(Uzbekistan)	DF	25 March 1976 (aged 33)	Krylia Sovetov	2007		61+	1+
3	Goçguly Goçgulyýew	(Turkmenistan)	DF	26 May 1977 (aged 32)	Kairat	2007		64+	10+
4	Hayrulla Karimov	(Uzbekistan)	DF	22 April 1978 (aged 31)	Mash'al Mubarek	2008		44+	3+
6	Anvar Gafurov	(Uzbekistan)	DF	14 May 1982 (aged 27)	Mash'al Mubarek	2009		41	1
8	Ratinho	(Brazil)	DF	31 May 1986 (aged 23)	Mogi Mirim	2009		40	3
23	Sakhob Juraev	(Uzbekistan)	DF	19 January 1987 (aged 22)	Lokomotiv Tashkent	2007		64+	0+
	Abduqahhor Hojiakbarov	(Uzbekistan)	DF	18 July 1989 (aged 20)	Youth Team	2007		3+	0+
	Leomar	(Brazil)	DF	12 June 1986 (aged 23)	loan from Mogi Mirim	2009		1	0
Midfielders
7	Azizbek Haydarov	(Uzbekistan)	MF	8 July 1985 (aged 24)	Lokomotiv Tashkent	2007		83+	3+
9	Shavkat Salomov	(Uzbekistan)	MF	13 November 1985 (aged 23)	Buxoro	2007		76+	17+
10	Rivaldo	(Brazil)	MF	19 April 1972 (aged 37)	AEK Athens	2008		58+	31+
18	Timur Kapadze	(Uzbekistan)	MF	5 September 1981 (aged 28)	Pakhtakor Tashkent	2007		65+	9+
19	Jasur Hasanov	(Uzbekistan)	MF	2 August 1983 (aged 26)	Mash'al Mubarek	2007		108+	8+
22	Victor Karpenko	(Uzbekistan)	MF	7 September 1977 (aged 32)	Kairat	2007		88+	22+
28	Ruslan Melziddinov	(Uzbekistan)	MF	26 March 1985 (aged 24)	Neftchi Fergana	2009		15	0
29	João Victor	(Brazil)	MF	7 November 1988 (aged 21)	Treze	2009		41	3
30	Server Djeparov	(Uzbekistan)	MF	3 October 1982 (aged 27)	Pakhtakor Tashkent	2008		77+	33+
	Maruf Ahmadjonov	(Uzbekistan)	MF			2008		2+	0+
Forwards
11	Kamoliddin Murzoev	(Uzbekistan)	FW	17 February 1987 (aged 22)	Nasaf	2008		7	0
17	José Luis Villanueva	(Chile)	FW	5 November 1981 (aged 28)	Vasco da Gama	2008		44+	24+
20	Anvarjon Soliev	(Uzbekistan)	FW	5 February 1978 (aged 31)	Pakhtakor Tashkent	2008		69+	36+
24	Bahodir Pardaev	(Uzbekistan)	FW	26 April 1987 (aged 22)	Youth Team	2008		15+	3+
	Miraziz Jalalov	(Uzbekistan)	FW	22 January 1992 (aged 17)	Youth Team	2007		3+	1+
Unknown
	Kamoliddin Tojiboev	(Uzbekistan)				2009		3	0
	Sanjar Turaqulov	(Uzbekistan)				2009		3	0
Out on Loan
10	Ulugbek Bakayev	(Uzbekistan)	FW	28 November 1978 (aged 30)	Tobol	2008		32+	9+
13	Aleksandr Khvostunov	(Uzbekistan)	DF	9 January 1974 (aged 35)	Navbahor Namangan	2007		81+	1+
27	Anvar Rakhimov	(Uzbekistan)	MF	20 February 1988 (aged 21)	Xorazm FK Urganch	2007		6+	0+
Players who left during the season
5	Luizão	(Brazil)	DF	3 January 1987 (aged 22)	loan from Locarno	2008		27+	2+

=== Out on loan ===
Note: Flags indicate national team as defined under FIFA eligibility rules; some limited exceptions apply. Players may hold more than one non-FIFA nationality.

No.	Pos.	Nation	Player
11	FW	UZB	Ulugbek Bakayev (at (Uzbekistan) Dinamo Samarqand)
13	DF	UZB	Aleksandr Khvostunov (at (Uzbekistan) Dinamo Samarqand)

No.	Pos.	Nation	Player
27	MF	UZB	Anvar Rakhimov (at (Uzbekistan) Olmaliq)

=== Technical staff ===
Position	Name
Manager	(Brazil) Luiz Felipe Scolari
Assistant coach	(Brazil) Flavio da Cunia Tesheira
Assistant coach	(Uzbekistan) Mirjalol Kasimov
Physical fitness coach	(Brazil) Darlan Jose Sneider
Goalkeeping coach	(Brazil) Antonio Carlos Pracidelli

== Transfers ==
=== In ===
Date	Position	Nationality	Name	From	Fee	Ref.
Winter 2009	DF	(Brazil)	Ratinho	Mogi Mirim	Undisclosed	
Winter 2009	DF	(Uzbekistan)	Anvar Gafurov	Mash'al Mubarek	Undisclosed	
Winter 2009	MF	(Brazil)	João Victor	Treze	Undisclosed	
Winter 2009	MF	(Uzbekistan)	Ruslan Melziddinov	Neftchi Fargʻona	Undisclosed	
Summer 2009	GK	(Uzbekistan)	Ignatiy Nesterov	Pakhtakor Tashkent	Undisclosed	
Summer 2009	MF	(Uzbekistan)	Kamoliddin Murzoev	Nasaf	Undisclosed	

=== Loans in ===
Start date	Position	Nationality	Name	To	End date	Ref.
Summer 2008	DF	(Brazil)	Luizão	Locarno	Summer 2009	
Summer 2009	DF	(Brazil)	Leomar	Mogi Mirim	Winter 2010	

=== Out ===
Date	Position	Nationality	Name	To	Fee	Ref.
Winter 2009	DF	(Uzbekistan)	Aleksey Nikolaev	Shenzhen Asia Travel	Undisclosed	
Winter 2009	MF	(Uzbekistan)	Vyacheslav Ponomarev	Shurtan Guzar	Undisclosed	
Winter 2009	FW	(Uzbekistan)	Anvar Rajabov	Buxoro	Undisclosed	

=== Loans out ===
Start date	Position	Nationality	Name	To	End date	Ref.
Winter 2009	MF	(Uzbekistan)	Anvar Rakhimov	Olmaliq	Winter 2010	
Summer 2009	DF	(Uzbekistan)	Aleksandr Khvostunov	Dinamo Samarqand	Winter 2010	
Summer 2009	FW	(Uzbekistan)	Ulugbek Bakayev	Dinamo Samarqand	Winter 2010	

=== Released ===
Date	Position	Nationality	Name	Joined	Date
Winter 2009	MF	(Uzbekistan)	Rashidjon Gafurov	Retired	
Winter 2009	MF	(Uzbekistan)	Sergey Lushan		
Winter 2009	FW	(Uzbekistan)	Dmitry Kuzin		
Winter 2009	FW	(Uzbekistan)	Ilkhom Muminjonov	Retired	
Summer 2009	GK	(Uzbekistan)	Oleg Belyakov		
Summer 2009	DF	(Uzbekistan)	Shavkat Raimqulov	Shurtan Guzar	

== Competitions ==
Bunyodkor was present in all major competitions: Uzbek League, the AFC Champions League and the Uzbek Cup.

=== Uzbek League ===
==== Results ====
1 March 2009 1	Dinamo Samarqand	0–1	Bunyodkor	Samarkand
15:30 UZT (UTC+5)		Summary	Victor 38'	Stadium: Dinamo Samarkand Stadium; Attendance: 10,101; Referee: Ravshan Irmatov

6 March 2009 2	Bunyodkor	4–0	Qizilqum Zarafshon	Tashkent
17:00 UZT (UTC+5)	Villanueva 5', 9'; Hasanov 67'; Djeparov 76'	Summary		Stadium: JAR Stadium; Attendance: 3,888; Referee: Valery Kostrikin

23 March 2009 3	Neftchi Farg'ona	0–3	Bunyodkor	Fergana
17:00 UZT (UTC+5)		Summary	Rivaldo 18'; Gafurov 27'; Karpenko 50'	Stadium: Fargona Stadium; Attendance: 17,525; Referee: Ravshan Irmatov

4 April 2009 4	Lokomotiv Tashkent	0–2	Bunyodkor	Tashkent
16:00 UZT (UTC+5)		Summary	Victor 37'; Soliev 46'	Stadium: Lokomotiv Stadium; Attendance: 3,871; Referee: Valentin Kovalenko

12 April 2009 5	Bunyodkor	3–0	Mash'al Mubarek	Tashkent
17:00 UZT (UTC+5)	Rivaldo 32' (pen.); Salomov 54'; Djeparov 90+3'	Summary		Stadium: JAR Stadium; Attendance: 5,431; Referee: Vadim Agishev

16 April 2009 6	Xorazm	1–2	Bunyodkor	Urgench
16:30 UZT (UTC+5)	R.Ahmedov 31'	Summary	Goçgulyýew 45'; Rivaldo 56'	Stadium: Xorazm Stadium; Attendance: 21,275; Referee: Bakhtiyor Togaev

25 April 2009 7	Bunyodkor	3–1	Olmaliq	Tashkent
17:00 UZT (UTC+5)	Ratinho 17'; Soliev 24', 29'	Summary	Fomenka 48'	Stadium: JAR Stadium; Attendance: 6,725; Referee: Vladislav Tseytlin

30 April 2009 8	Shurtan Guzar	0–1	Bunyodkor	G‘uzor
17:00 UZT (UTC+5)		Summary	Rivaldo 62'	Stadium: G'uzor Stadium; Attendance: 5,021; Referee: Oleg Rubakov

10 May 2009 9	Bunyodkor	4–0	Buxoro	Tashkent
18:00 UZT (UTC+5)	Villanueva 55'; Ratinho 60'; Soliev 74', 90'	Summary		Stadium: JAR Stadium; Attendance: 6,682; Referee: Bakhtiyor Togaev

14 May 2009 10	Andijan	1–2	Bunyodkor	Andijan
17:00 UZT (UTC+5)	S.Mirkholdirshoyev 60'	Summary	Rivaldo 66'; Soliev 67'	Stadium: Soghlom Avlod Stadium; Attendance: 20,222; Referee: Marat Ismailov

21 June 2009 13	Bunyodkor	6–0	Navbahor Namangan	Tashkent
19:00 UZT (UTC+5)	Villanueva 13', 16'; Rivaldo 24', 40'; Djeparov 57'; Soliev 90+2'	Summary		Stadium: JAR Stadium; Attendance: 5,815; Referee: Rustam Hamidov

25 June 2009 14	Metallurg Bekabad	0–4	Bunyodkor	Bekabad
18:00 UZT (UTC+5)		Summary	Rivaldo 6', 59', 90+3'; Soliev 35'	Stadium: Metallurg Bekabad Stadium; Attendance: 8,245; Referee: Rustam Saidov

29 June 2009 15	Bunyodkor	5–0	Sogdiana Jizzakh	Tashkent
19:30 UZT (UTC+5)	Rivaldo 54', 61', 65', 71'; Djeparov 90+3'	Summary		Stadium: JAR Stadium; Attendance: 5,416; Referee: Valentin Kovalenko

3 July 2009 12	Nasaf	1–2	Bunyodkor	Qarshi
19:30 UZT (UTC+5)	Murzoev 12' (pen.)	Summary	Villanueva 8', 29'	Stadium: Markaziy Stadium; Attendance: 16,777; Referee: Marat Ismailov

12 July 2009 11	Bunyodkor	1–2	Pakhtakor Tashkent	Tashkent
19:00 UZT (UTC+5)	Aliqulov 21' (o.g.); Hasanov 58'	Summary	Geynrikh 71'	Stadium: JAR Stadium; Attendance: 9,251; Referee: Ravshan Irmatov

4 August 2009 16	Sogdiana Jizzakh	0–3	Bunyodkor	Jizzakh
17:45 UZT (UTC+5)		Summary	Karimov 26'; Karpenko 52'; Kapadze 73'	Stadium: Sogdiana Stadium; Attendance: 9,567; Referee: Viloyat Najafaliev

5 August 2009 23	Bunyodkor	5–0	Shurtan Guzar	Tashkent
09:49 UZT (UTC+5)	Rivaldo 7'; Villanueva 10', 62'; Djeparov 69', 86'	Summary		Stadium: JAR Stadium; Attendance: 5,687; Referee: Viktor Serazetdinov

15 August 2009 17	Bunyodkor	4–1	Metallurg Bekabad	Tashkent
19:00 UZT (UTC+5)	Soliev 10'; Rivaldo 30' (pen.); Djeparov 75'; Victor 75'	Summary	B.Kalevic 20'	Stadium: JAR Stadium; Attendance: 5,812; Referee: Vladislav Tseytlin

19 August 2009 18	Navbahor Namangan	0–3	Bunyodkor	Namangan
17:30 UZT (UTC+5)		Summary	Villanueva 64'; Rivaldo 67'; Kapadze 89'	Stadium: Markaziy Stadium; Attendance: 17,295; Referee: Rustam Saidov

24 August 2009 19	Bunyodkor	2–1	Nasaf	Tashkent
19:00 UZT (UTC+5)	Rivaldo 27' (pen.); Djeparov 73'	Summary	Shomurodov 54'	Stadium: JAR Stadium; Attendance: 5,672; Referee: Rustam Hamidov

9 September 2009 25	Bunyodkor	5–1	Xorazm	Tashkent
17:00 UZT (UTC+5)	Soliev 8', 55', 58'; Rivaldo 38'; Karimov 70'	Summary	R.Qurbonboyev 90+1'	Stadium: JAR Stadium; Attendance: 5,113; Referee: Aleksandr Petrov

13 September 2009 21	Bunyodkor	3–0	Andijan	Tashkent
17:00 UZT (UTC+5)	Hasanov 38'; Karimov 59'; Villanueva 78'	Summary		Stadium: JAR Stadium; Attendance: 6,537; Referee: Olim Tolibjonov

18 September 2009 22	Buxoro	1–2	Bunyodkor	Tashkent
17:00 UZT (UTC+5)	S.Qobilov 16'	Summary	Salomov 36'; Villanueva 78'	Stadium: JAR Stadium; Attendance: 12,253; Referee: Valery Kostrikin

4 October 2009 25	Olmaliq	2–2	Bunyodkor	Olmaliq
15:45 UZT (UTC+5)	Fomenka 39'; A.Vostrikov 62'	Summary	Djeparov 85', 88'	Stadium: Olmaliq Stadium; Attendance: 12,351; Referee: Ravshan Irmatov

14 October 2009 20	Pakhtakor Tashkent	0–0	Bunyodkor	Tashkent
18:30 UZT (UTC+5)		Summary		Stadium: Pakhtakor Markaziy Stadium; Attendance: 19,204; Referee: Ravshan Irmatov

24 October 2009 27	Bunyodkor	2–1	Lokomotiv Tashkent	Tashkent
17:00 UZT (UTC+5)	Soliev 62'; Rivaldo 88'	Summary	R.A'Zamov 7'	Stadium: JAR Stadium; Attendance: 7,895; Referee: Rustam Saidov

31 October 2009 28	Bunyodkor	5–0	Neftchi Farg'ona	Tashkent
17:00 UZT (UTC+5)	Soliev 4'; Djeparov 36'; Hasanov 43'; Villanueva 59'; Kapadze 82'	Summary		Stadium: JAR Stadium; Attendance: 4,573; Referee: Oleg Rubakov

5 November 2009 29	Qizilqum Zarafshon	1–2	Bunyodkor	Navoiy
14:30 UZT (UTC+5)	Koshelev 90'	Summary	Soliev 64', 82'	Stadium: Yoshlar Stadium; Attendance: 3,754; Referee: Rustam Hamidov

9 November 2009 30	Bunyodkor	2–0	Dinamo Samarqand	Tashkent
14:30 UZT (UTC+5)	Soliev 28', 68'	Summary		Stadium: JAR Stadium; Attendance: 2,713; Referee: Rustam Bobomurodov

12 November 2009 26	Mash'al Mubarek	0–1	Bunyodkor	Muborak
15:45 UZT (UTC+5)		Summary	Karpenko 45'	Stadium: Bahrom Vafoev Stadium; Attendance: 5,011; Referee: Viktor Serazetdinov

==== League table ====
Pos	Team	Pld	W	D	L	GF	GA	GD	Pts	Qualification or relegation
1	Bunyodkor	30	28	2	0	85	13	+72	86	2010 AFC Champions League Group stage
2	Pakhtakor Tashkent	30	18	10	2	69	16	+53	64	2010 AFC Champions League Group stage
3	Nasaf Qarshi	30	16	7	7	48	27	+21	55	
4	Olmaliq FK	30	15	3	12	50	38	+12	48	
5	Neftchi Farg'ona	30	14	4	12	43	38	+5	46	

Updated to match(es) played on 15 November 2009. Source: Uzbekistan Professional Football League
Rules for classification: 1) points; 2) goal difference; 3) number of goals scored.

=== Uzbekistan Cup ===
27 March 2009 Last 16	Dynamo-Karshi	0–2	Bunyodkor	Qarshi
15:00 UZT (UTC+5)		Summary	Salomov 41'; Pardaev 88'	Stadium: Markaziy Stadium; Attendance: 4,220; Referee: Zokir Qodirov

10 June 2009 Quarterfinal	Bunyodkor	2–1	Shurtan Guzar	Tashkent
18:00 UZT (UTC+5)	Villanueva 16'; Salomov 26'	Summary	Geworkýan 40'	Stadium: JAR Stadium; Attendance: 4,225; Referee: Andrey Tambovsev

30 June 2009 Semifinal 1st leg	Nasaf	0–2	Bunyodkor	Qarshi
18:00 UZT (UTC+5)		Summary	Soliev 67'; Karpenko 81'	Stadium: Markaziy Stadium; Attendance: 9,705; Referee: Sulton Zaylobiddinov

6 July 2009 Semifinal 2nd leg	Bunyodkor	3–0 (5–0 agg.)	Nasaf	Tashkent
19:00 UZT (UTC+5)	Rivaldo 39'; Soliev 80'; Ratinho 82'	Summary		Stadium: JAR Stadium; Attendance: 6,348; Referee: Sulton Zaylobiddinov

==== Final ====
8 August 2009	Pakhtakor Tashkent	1–0	Bunyodkor	Tashkent
19:30 UZT (UTC+5)	Andreev 35'	Summary		Stadium: Pakhtakor Markaziy Stadium; Attendance: 27,543; Referee: Marat Ismailov

=== AFC Champions League ===
==== Group stage ====
Pos	Team	Pld	W	D	L	GF	GA	GD	Pts	Qualification
1	(Saudi Arabia) Al-Ettifaq	6	4	0	2	15	8	+7	12	Advance to knockout stage
2	(Uzbekistan) Bunyodkor	6	2	2	2	5	9	−4	8	Advance to knockout stage
3	(Iran) Sepahan	6	2	1	3	9	7	+2	7	
4	(United Arab Emirates) Al-Shabab	6	2	1	3	6	11	−5	7	

Source: WorldFootball.net

11 March 2009 1	Bunyodkor (Uzbekistan)	2–1	(Saudi Arabia) Al-Ettifaq	Tashkent, Uzbekistan
17:00 UZT (UTC+5)	Soliev 27', 48'	AFC Report; Bunyodkr Report	Bashir 68'	Stadium: JAR Stadium; Attendance: 9,120; Referee: Peter Green (Australia)

18 March 2009 2	Al-Shabab (United Arab Emirates)	2–0	(Uzbekistan) Bunyodkor	Dubai, United Arab Emirates
21:30 UZT (UTC+5)	Obaid 3'; Mguni 39'	AFC Report; Bunyodkr Report		Stadium: Al-Maktoum Stadium; Attendance: 4,500; Referee: Mohsen Basma (Syria)

8 April 2009 3	Bunyodkor (Uzbekistan)	2–2	(Iran) Sepahan	Tashkent, Uzbekistan
18:00 UZT (UTC+5)	Salomov 27'; Ashurmatov 74'	AFC Report; Bunyodkr Report	Aghili 45+2'; Emad Mohammed 60'	Stadium: JAR Stadium; Attendance: 9,000; Referee: Minoru Tojo (Japan)

21 April 2009 4	Sepahan (Iran)	0–1	(Uzbekistan) Bunyodkor	Esfahan, Iran
16:30 UZT (UTC+5)		AFC Report; Bunyodkr Report	Kapadze 19'	Stadium: Foolad Shahr Stadium; Attendance: 10,000; Referee: Sun Baojie (China)

5 May 2009 5	Al-Ettifaq (Saudi Arabia)	4–0	(Uzbekistan) Bunyodkor	Dammam, Saudi Arabia
22:00 UZT (UTC+5)	Tagoe 16', 38'; Bashir 48'; Al-Raja 81'	AFC Report; Bunyodkr Report		Stadium: Prince Mohamed bin Fahd Stadium; Attendance: 8,000; Referee: Ben Williams (Australia)

19 May 2009 6	Bunyodkor (Uzbekistan)	0–0	(United Arab Emirates) Al-Shabab	Tashkent, Uzbekistan
19:00 UZT (UTC+5)		AFC Report; Bunyodkr Report		Stadium: JAR Stadium; Attendance: 8,500; Referee: Abdullah Al-Hilali (Oman)

==== Knockout stage ====
27 May 2009 Round of 16	Persepolis (Iran)	0–1	(Uzbekistan) Bunyodkor	Tehran, Iran
17:30 UZT (UTC+5)		AFC Report; Bunyodkr Report	Rivaldo 41' (pen.)	Stadium: Azadi Stadium; Attendance: 95,225; Referee: Kim Dong-Jin (Korea Republic)

23 September 2009 Quarter-final 1st leg	Bunyodkor (Uzbekistan)	3–1	(South Korea) Pohang Steelers	Tashkent, Uzbekistan
17:00 UZT (UTC+5)	Karpenko 29'; Djeparov 79', 85'	AFC Report; Bunyodkr Report	Noh Byung-Joon 7'	Stadium: JAR Stadium; Attendance: 8,350; Referee: Khalil Al-Ghamdi (Saudi Arabia)

30 September 2009 Quarter-final 2nd leg	Pohang Steelers (South Korea)	4–1 (a.e.t.) (5–4 agg.)	(Uzbekistan) Bunyodkor	Pohang, South Korea
14:30 UZT (UTC+5)	Kim Jae-Sung 46'; Denilson 57', 77'; Stevo 102'	AFC Report; Bunyodkr Report	Victor Karpenko 89'	Stadium: Steelyard Stadium; Attendance: 16,252; Referee: Muhsen Basma (Syria)

== Squad statistics ==
As of match played 12 November 2009

=== Appearances and goals ===
No.	Pos	Nat	Player	Total		Uzbek League		Uzbek Cup		Champions League	
No.	Pos	Nat	Player	Apps	Goals	Apps	Goals	Apps	Goals	Apps	Goals
1	GK	(Uzbekistan) UZB	Ignatiy Nesterov	17	0	14	0	1	0	2	0
2	DF	(Uzbekistan) UZB	Bakhtiyor Ashurmatov	8	1	3+2	0	1	0	1+1	1
3	DF	(Turkmenistan) TKM	Goçguly Goçgulyýew	19	1	12	1	1	0	6	0
4	DF	(Uzbekistan) UZB	Hayrulla Karimov	24	3	15+1	3	3	0	5	0
6	DF	(Uzbekistan) UZB	Anvar Gafurov	41	1	27+1	1	4	0	9	0
7	MF	(Uzbekistan) UZB	Azizbek Haydarov	37	0	20+5	0	4	0	6+2	0
8	DF	(Brazil) BRA	Ratinho	40	3	27+1	2	5	1	7	0
9	MF	(Uzbekistan) UZB	Shavkat Salomov	18	5	6+5	2	2	2	3+2	1
10	MF	(Brazil) BRA	Rivaldo	42	22	26+3	20	4	1	9	1
11	FW	(Uzbekistan) UZB	Kamoliddin Murzoev	7	0	1+4	0	0	0	0+2	0
12	GK	(Uzbekistan) UZB	Murod Zukhurov	16	0	10	0	2	0	4	0
17	FW	(Chile) CHI	José Luis Villanueva	29	14	14+10	13	5	1	0	0
18	MF	(Uzbekistan) UZB	Timur Kapadze	32	4	5+19	3	0+2	0	5+1	1
19	MF	(Uzbekistan) UZB	Jasur Hasanov	40	4	25+2	4	3+1	0	8+1	0
20	FW	(Uzbekistan) UZB	Anvarjon Soliev	38	22	16+10	18	0+4	2	5+3	2
22	MF	(Uzbekistan) UZB	Victor Karpenko	23	6	7+7	3	2+2	1	1+4	2
23	DF	(Uzbekistan) UZB	Sakhob Juraev	33	0	20+2	0	4	0	5+2	0
24	FW	(Uzbekistan) UZB	Bahodir Pardaev	3	1	0	0	0+1	1	0+2	0
25	GK	(Uzbekistan) UZB	Pavel Bugalo	11	0	6	0	2	0	3	0
28	MF	(Uzbekistan) UZB	Ruslan Melziddinov	15	0	6+4	0	2+1	0	0+2	0
29	MF	(Brazil) BRA	João Victor	41	3	29	3	5	0	7	0
30	MF	(Uzbekistan) UZB	Server Djeparov	41	13	27+1	11	2+2	0	9	2
	DF	(Uzbekistan) UZB	Abduqahhor Hojiakbarov	2	0	1+1	0	0	0	0	0
	DF	(Brazil) BRA	Leomar	1	0	1	0	0	0	0	0
	MF	(Uzbekistan) UZB	Maruf Ahmadjonov	1	0	0+1	0	0	0	0	0
	FW	(Uzbekistan) UZB	Miraziz Jalalov	1	0	0+1	0	0	0	0	0
		(Uzbekistan) UZB	Kamoliddin Tojiboev	3	0	0+2	0	1	0	0	0
		(Uzbekistan) UZB	Sanjar Turaqulov	3	0	0+2	0	0+1	0	0	0
Players away from Bunyodkor on loan:
11	FW	(Uzbekistan) UZB	Ulugbek Bakayev	9	0	0+4	0	0+1	0	2+2	0
13	DF	(Uzbekistan) UZB	Aleksandr Khvostunov	6	0	1+1	0	1	0	2+1	0
Players who left Bunyodkor during the season:
5	DF	(Brazil) BRA	Luizão	12	0	11	0	1	0	0	0

=== Goal scorers ===
Place	Position	Nation	Number	Name	Uzbek League	Uzbekistan Cup	Champions League	Total
1	MF	(Brazil)	10	Rivaldo	20	1	1	22
1	FW	(Uzbekistan)	20	Anvar Soliev	18	2	2	22
3	MF	(Chile)	17	José Luis Villanueva	13	1	0	14
4	MF	(Uzbekistan)	30	Server Djeparov	11	0	2	13
5	MF	(Uzbekistan)	22	Viktor Karpenko	3	1	2	6
6	MF	(Uzbekistan)	9	Shavkat Salomov	2	2	1	5
7	MF	(Uzbekistan)	19	Jasur Hasanov	4	0	0	4
7	MF	(Uzbekistan)	18	Timur Kapadze	3	0	1	4
9	DF	(Uzbekistan)	4	Hayrulla Karimov	3	0	0	3
9	MF	(Brazil)	29	João Victor	3	0	0	3
9	DF	(Brazil)	8	Ratinho	2	1	0	3
12	DF	(Uzbekistan)	6	Anvar Gafurov	1	0	0	1
12	DF	(Turkmenistan)	3	Goçguly Goçgulyýew	1	0	0	1
12	FW	(Uzbekistan)	24	Bahodir Pardaev	0	1	0	1
12	DF	(Uzbekistan)	2	Bakhtiyor Ashurmatov	0	0	1	1
12				Own goal	1	0	0	1
				TOTALS	85	9	10	104

== See also ==
- List of unbeaten football club seasons
