= 2008 FC Bunyodkor season =

FC Bunyodkor
2008 season
- Manager: Mirjalol Kasimov (until 27 September 2008); Zico (from 27 September)
- Uzbek League: 1st
- Uzbek Cup: Champions
- AFC Champions League: Semifinal vs Adelaide United
- Top goalscorer: League: Server Djeparov (19); All: Server Djeparov (21)
| Home colours | Away colours |

The 2008 season was Bunyodkor's second season in the Uzbek League in Uzbekistan. Bunyodkor competed in the Uzbek League, the Uzbek Cup and AFC Champions League tournaments.

== Squad ==
As of match played 23 November 2008

| No. | Name | Nationality | Position | Date of birth (age) | Signed from | Signed in | Contract ends | Apps. | Goals |
Goalkeepers
| 12 | Murod Zukhurov | (Uzbekistan) | GK | 23 February 1983 (aged 25) | Navbahor Namangan | 2008 | | 15+ | 0 |
| 25 | Pavel Bugalo | (Uzbekistan) | GK | 21 August 1974 (aged 34) | Ordabasy | 2007 | | 55+ | 0 |
| 31 | Oleg Belyakov | (Uzbekistan) | GK | 1 February 1972 (aged 36) | Navbahor Namangan | 2007 | | 10+ | 0 |
| | Mukhiddin Khudoyorov | (Uzbekistan) | GK | 5 November 1990 (aged 18) | Youth Team | 2007 | | 0 | 0 |
Defenders
| 2 | Bakhtiyor Ashurmatov | (Uzbekistan) | DF | 25 March 1976 (aged 32) | Krylia Sovetov | 2007 | | 53+ | 0+ |
| 3 | Goçguly Goçgulyýew | (Turkmenistan) | DF | 26 May 1977 (aged 31) | Kairat | 2007 | | 45+ | 9+ |
| 4 | Hayrulla Karimov | (Uzbekistan) | DF | 22 April 1978 (aged 30) | Mash'al Mubarek | 2008 | | 21+ | 0+ |
| 5 | Luizão | (Brazil) | DF | 3 January 1987 (aged 21) | loan from Locarno | 2008 | | 15+ | 2+ |
| 13 | Aleksandr Khvostunov | (Uzbekistan) | DF | 9 January 1974 (aged 34) | Navbahor Namangan | 2007 | | 75+ | 1+ |
| 14 | Shavkat Raimqulov | (Uzbekistan) | DF | 7 May 1984 (aged 24) | Andijon | 2008 | | 8+ | 0+ |
| 23 | Sakhob Juraev | (Uzbekistan) | DF | 19 January 1987 (aged 21) | Lokomotiv Tashkent | 2007 | | 31+ | 0+ |
| 28 | Aleksey Nikolaev | (Uzbekistan) | DF | 5 September 1979 (aged 29) | Aktobe | 2008 | | 23+ | 0+ |
| | Abduqahhor Hojiakbarov | (Uzbekistan) | DF | 18 July 1989 (aged 19) | Youth Team | 2007 | | 1 | 0 |
Midfielders
| 6 | Rivaldo | (Brazil) | MF | 19 April 1972 (aged 36) | AEK Athens | 2008 | | 16+ | 9+ |
| 8 | Rashidjon Gafurov | (Uzbekistan) | MF | 26 September 1977 (aged 31) | Mash'al Mubarek | 2007 | | 58+ | 7+ |
| 9 | Shavkat Salomov | (Uzbekistan) | MF | 13 November 1985 (aged 23) | Buxoro | 2007 | | 58+ | 12+ |
| 19 | Jasur Hasanov | (Uzbekistan) | MF | 2 August 1983 (aged 25) | Mash'al Mubarek | 2007 | | 68+ | 4+ |
| 22 | Victor Karpenko | (Uzbekistan) | MF | 7 September 1977 (aged 31) | Kairat | 2007 | | 65+ | 16+ |
| 24 | Sergey Lushan | (Uzbekistan) | MF | 14 June 1973 (aged 35) | Yunit Samara | 2007 | | 37+ | 6+ |
| 26 | Azizbek Haydarov | (Uzbekistan) | MF | 8 July 1985 (aged 23) | Lokomotiv Tashkent | 2007 | | 46+ | 3+ |
| 27 | Anvar Rakhimov | (Uzbekistan) | MF | 20 February 1988 (aged 20) | Xorazm FK Urganch | 2007 | | 6+ | 0+ |
| 29 | Timur Kapadze | (Uzbekistan) | MF | 5 September 1981 (aged 27) | Pakhtakor Tashkent | 2007 | | 33+ | 5+ |
| 30 | Server Djeparov | (Uzbekistan) | MF | 3 October 1982 (aged 26) | Pakhtakor Tashkent | 2008 | | 36+ | 20+ |
| 55 | Vyacheslav Ponomarev | (Uzbekistan) | MF | 2 January 1978 (aged 30) | Pakhtakor Tashkent | 2007 | | 24+ | 0+ |
| | Maruf Ahmadjonov | (Uzbekistan) | MF | | | 2008 | | 1+ | 0+ |
| | Elyor Jahonov | (Uzbekistan) | MF | 11 January 1986 (aged 22) | | 2007 | | 5+ | 0+ |
| | Ibragim Rahimov | (Uzbekistan) | MF | | | 2008 | | 1 | 0 |
Forwards
| 10 | Ulugbek Bakayev | (Uzbekistan) | FW | 28 November 1978 (aged 29) | Tobol | 2008 | | 23+ | 9+ |
| 15 | Miraziz Jalalov | (Uzbekistan) | FW | 22 January 1992 (aged 16) | Youth Team | 2007 | | 2+ | 1+ |
| 16 | Anvar Rajabov | (Uzbekistan) | FW | 23 January 1988 (aged 20) | Buxoro | 2008 | | 9+ | 1+ |
| 17 | José Luis Villanueva | (Chile) | FW | 5 November 1981 (aged 27) | Vasco da Gama | 2008 | | 15+ | 10+ |
| 20 | Anvarjon Soliev | (Uzbekistan) | FW | 5 February 1978 (aged 30) | Pakhtakor Tashkent | 2008 | | 31+ | 14+ |
| 44 | Ilkhom Muminjonov | (Uzbekistan) | FW | 21 January 1979 (aged 29) | Lokomotiv Tashkent | 2007 | | 19+ | 16+ |
| 54 | Bahodir Pardaev | (Uzbekistan) | FW | 26 April 1987 (aged 21) | Youth Team | 2008 | | 12+ | 3+ |
| | Dmitry Kuzin | (Uzbekistan) | FW | 11 July 1991 (aged 17) | Youth Team | 2007 | | 9+ | 1+ |
Players who left during the season
| 7 | Jamol Otakulov | (Uzbekistan) | MF | 6 December 1985 (aged 22) | | 2008 | | 0 | 0 |
| 18 | Yannis Mandzukas | (Uzbekistan) | MF | 8 April 1984 (aged 24) | Kimyogar Chirchiq | 2007 | | 30+ | 2+ |

=== Technical staff ===
| Position | Name |
|---|---|
| Manager | (Brazil) Zico |
| Assistant coach | (Uzbekistan) Hikmat Irgashev |
| Fitness coach | (Uzbekistan) Alexander Volkov |
| Doctor | (Uzbekistan) Kahramon Nurmuhammedov |
| Goalkeeping coach | (Uzbekistan) Abdusattar Rakhimov |

== Transfers ==
=== In ===
| Date | Position | Nationality | Name | From | Fee | Ref. |
|---|---|---|---|---|---|---|
| Winter 2008 | DF | (Uzbekistan) | Hayrulla Karimov | Mash'al Mubarek | Undisclosed | |
| Winter 2008 | DF | (Uzbekistan) | Shavkat Raimqulov | Andijan | Undisclosed | |
| Winter 2008 | DF | (Uzbekistan) | Sakhob Juraev | Lokomotiv Tashkent | Undisclosed | |
| Winter 2008 | DF | (Uzbekistan) | Aleksey Nikolaev | Aktobe | Undisclosed | |
| Winter 2008 | MF | (Uzbekistan) | Server Djeparov | Pakhtakor Tashkent | Undisclosed | |
| Winter 2008 | FW | (Uzbekistan) | Ulugbek Bakayev | Tobol] | Undisclosed | |
| Winter 2008 | FW | (Uzbekistan) | Anvar Rajabov | Buxoro | Undisclosed | |
| Winter 2008 | FW | (Uzbekistan) | Anvarjon Soliev | Pakhtakor Tashkent | Undisclosed | |
| Summer 2008 | MF | (Brazil) | Rivaldo | AEK Athens | Undisclosed | |
| Summer 2008 | MF | (Chile) | José Luis Villanueva | Vasco da Gama | Undisclosed | |
| Summer 2008 | GK | (Uzbekistan) | Murod Zukhurov | Navbahor Namangan | Undisclosed | |

=== Loans in ===
| Start date | Position | Nationality | Name | To | End date | Ref. |
|---|---|---|---|---|---|---|
| Summer 2008 | DF | (Brazil) | Luizão | Locarno | Summer 2009 | |

=== Out ===
| Date | Position | Nationality | Name | To | Fee | Ref. |
|---|---|---|---|---|---|---|
| Winter 2008 | DF | (Uzbekistan) | Abdumajid Toirov | OTMK Olmaliq | Undisclosed | |
| Winter 2008 | MF | (Turkmenistan) | Witaliý Alikperow | Merw | Undisclosed | |
| Winter 2008 | MF | (Uzbekistan) | Yorqin Nazarov | Qizilqum Zarafshon | Undisclosed | |
| Winter 2008 | FW | (Nigeria) | Patrick Agbo | Dinamo Samarqand | Undisclosed | |
| Winter 2008 | FW | (Uzbekistan) | Vladimir Shishelov | Zvezda Irkutsk | Undisclosed | |
| Summer 2008 | MF | (Uzbekistan) | Jamol Otakulov | Navbahor Namangan | Undisclosed | |
| Summer 2008 | MF | (Uzbekistan) | Yannis Mandzukas | Lokomotiv Tashkent | Undisclosed | |

=== Released ===
| Date | Position | Nationality | Name | Joined | Date |
|---|---|---|---|---|---|
| Winter 2008 | MF | (Uzbekistan) | Timur Yafarov | Metallurg Bekabad | 2009 |
| Winter 2008 | FW | (Uzbekistan) | Ernest Sedko | | |
| Winter 2008 | | (Uzbekistan) | Farruh Miryunusov | | |
| Winter 2008 | | (Uzbekistan) | Mirgolib Raimov | | |

== Competitions ==
Bunyodkor was present in all major competitions: Uzbek League, the AFC Champions League and the Uzbek Cup.

=== Uzbek League ===
==== League table ====
| Pos | Team | Pld | W | D | L | GF | GA | GD | Pts | Qualification or relegation |
|---|---|---|---|---|---|---|---|---|---|---|
| 1 | Bunyodkor | 30 | 25 | 4 | 1 | 75 | 13 | +62 | 79 | 2009 AFC Champions League Group stage |
| 2 | Pakhtakor | 30 | 23 | 5 | 2 | 64 | 14 | +50 | 74 | 2009 AFC Champions League Group stage |
| 3 | Neftchi Farg'ona | 30 | 18 | 6 | 6 | 42 | 25 | +17 | 60 | |
| 4 | Mash'al Mubarek | 30 | 15 | 7 | 8 | 38 | 26 | +12 | 52 | |
| 5 | FK Andijan | 30 | 13 | 7 | 10 | 35 | 28 | +7 | 46 | |

Updated to match(es) played on 24 November 2008. Source: Uzbekistan Professional Football League
Rules for classification: 1) points; 2) goal difference; 3) number of goals scored.

==== Results ====
| 2 March 2008 1 | Bunyodkor | 1 – 0 | Navbahor Namangan | Tashkent |
| 18:30 UZT (UTC+5) | Bakayev 24' | Summary | | Stadium: MHSK Stadium; Attendance: 9,000; Referee: Azamat Jalilov |

| 6 March 2008 2 | Bunyodkor | 3 – 1 | Neftchi Fargʻona | Tashkent |
| 20:00 UZT (UTC+5) | Djeparov 13' (pen.); Bakayev 18', 55' | Summary | Berdiev 90' (pen.) | Stadium: MHSK Stadium; Attendance: 8,000; Referee: Ravshan Irmatov |

| 30 March 2008 3 | Andijan | 0 – 1 | Bunyodkor | Andijan |
| 20:00 UZT (UTC+5) | | Summary | Soliev 68' | Stadium: Soghlom Avlod Stadium; Attendance: 14,000; Referee: Sultan Zaylobiddinov |

| 3 April 2008 4 | Bunyodkor | 5 – 0 | Uz-Dong-Joo | Tashkent |
| 19:00 UZT (UTC+5) | Goçgulyýew 19'; Djeparov 33', 35'; Salomov 83'; Pardaev 85' | Summary | | Stadium: MHSK Stadium; Attendance: 6,700; Referee: Andrei Tambovovtsev |

| 13 April 2008 5 | Qizilqum Zarafshon | 1 – 5 | Bunyodkor | Navoiy |
| 18:00 UZT (UTC+5) | M.Inogomov 52' | Summary | Bakayev 4'; Gafurov 28'; Lushan 86'; Karpenko 88'; Soliev 90' | Stadium: Yoshlar Stadium; Attendance: 4,125; Referee: Aazamat Jalilov |

| 18 April 2008 6 | Bunyodkor | 4 – 0 | Dinamo Samarqand | Tashkent |
| 20:00 UZT (UTC+5) | Djeparov 21', 85'; Goçgulyýew 54'; Bakayev 72' | Summary | | Stadium: MHSK Stadium; Attendance: 6,726; Referee: Oleg Rubakov |

| 27 April 2008 7 | Olmaliq | 0 – 1 | Bunyodkor | Olmaliq |
| 20:00 UZT (UTC+5) | | Summary | Soliev 70' | Stadium: Olmaliq Stadium; Attendance: 5,328; Referee: Kahraomn Yuldashev |

| 2 May 2008 8 | Bunyodkor | 2 – 0 | Lokomotiv Tashkent | Tashkent |
| 18:00 UZT (UTC+5) | Soliev 19'; Djeparov 90' | Summary | | Stadium: MHSK Stadium; Attendance: 3,737; Referee: Vladislav Zeitlin |

| 12 May 2008 9 | Buxoro | 0 – 3 | Bunyodkor | Bukhara |
| 18:00 UZT (UTC+5) | | Summary | Soliev 25'; Djeparov 28'; Pardaev 52' | Stadium: Buxoro Arena; Attendance: 8,400; Referee: Azamat Jalilov |

| 16 May 2008 10 | Bunyodkor | 7 – 0 | Shurtan Guzar | Tashkent |
| 20:00 UZT (UTC+5) | Karpenko 21', 28', 41'; Soliev 27'; Hasanov 55'; Rajabov 60'; Haydarov 90' | Summary | | Stadium: MHSK Stadium; Attendance: 3,805; Referee: Ravshan Irmatov |

| 26 May 2008 11 | Nasaf | 0 – 0 | Bunyodkor | Qarshi |
| 18:00 UZT (UTC+5) | | Summary | | Stadium: Markaziy Stadium; Attendance: 9,300; Referee: Jura Holmuradov |

| 26 June 2008 12 | Bunyodkor | 2 – 0 | Mash'al Mubarek | Tashkent |
| 20:00 UZT (UTC+5) | Djeparov 47'; Karpenko 65' | Summary | | Stadium: MHSK Stadium; Attendance: 4,636; Referee: Abduhamidullo Rasulov |

| 30 June 2008 13 | Sogdiana Jizzakh | 0 – 5 | Bunyodkor | Jizzakh |
| 20:00 UZT (UTC+5) | | Summary | Djeparov 11', 60'; Haydarov 32'; Soliev 49', 61' | Stadium: Sogdiana Stadium; Attendance: 12,453; Referee: Azamat Jalilov |

| 5 July 2008 14 | Bunyodkor | 4 – 2 | Metallurg Bekabad | Tashkent |
| 19:00 UZT (UTC+5) | Soliev 2'; Djeparov 21'; Kapadze 79'; Salomov 87' | Summary | B.Kalevitch 3'; A.Abdullayev 33' | Stadium: MHSK Stadium; Attendance: 5,013; Referee: Viktor Serazetdinov |

| 10 July 2008 15 | Pakhtakor Tashkent | 1 – 1 | Bunyodkor | Tashkent |
| 19:00 UZT (UTC+5) | Geynrikh 57' | Summary | Villanueva 31' | Stadium: Pakhtakor Markaziy Stadium; Attendance: 24,322; Referee: Azamat Jalilov |

| 8 August 2008 16 | Bunyodkor | 1 – 1 | Pakhtakor Tashkent | Tashkent |
| 19:00 UZT (UTC+5) | Villanueva 31' | Summary | Tadjiyev 90' | Stadium: MHSK Stadium; Attendance: 18,210; Referee: Alexander Petrov |

| 17 August 2008 17 | Metallurg Bekabad | 1 – 2 | Bunyodkor | Bekabad |
| 20:00 UZT (UTC+5) | U.Tajima 47' | Summary | Bakayev 28'; Villanueva 40' | Stadium: A.Anokhin Stadium; Attendance: 4,051; Referee: Kahramon Yuldashev |

| 25 August 2008 18 | Bunyodkor | 2 – 0 | Sogdiana Jizzakh | Tashkent |
| 20:00 UZT (UTC+5) | Villanueva 31'; Djeparov 82' | Summary | | Stadium: MHSK Stadium; Attendance: 5,873; Referee: Abduhamidullo Rasulov |

| 11 September 2008 19 | Mash'al Mubarek | 0 – 2 | Bunyodkor | Muborak |
| 20:00 UZT (UTC+5) | | Summary | Rivaldo 12', 89' | Stadium: Bahrom Vafoev Stadium; Attendance: 6,553; Referee: Jura Holmuradov |

| 13 September 2008 20 | Bunyodkor | 4 – 0 | Nasaf | Tashkent |
| 20:00 UZT (UTC+5) | Bakayev 11', 56'; Villanueva 34'; Djeparov 72' | Summary | | Stadium: MHSK Stadium; Attendance: 7,516; Referee: Andrew Tambovtsev |

| 14 October 2008 21 | Shurtan Guzar | 0 – 1 | Bunyodkor | G‘uzor |
| 20:00 UZT (UTC+5) | | Summary | Goçgulyýew 81' | Stadium: G'uzor Stadium; Attendance: 5,195; Referee: Rustam Khamidov |

| 28 September 2008 22 | Bunyodkor | 2 – 0 | Buxoro | Tashkent |
| 20:00 UZT (UTC+5) | Villanueva 45'; Kapadze 88' | Summary | | Stadium: MHSK Stadium; Attendance: 4,812; Referee: Ravshan Irmatov |

| 3 October 2008 23 | Lokomotiv Tashkent | 2 – 3 | Bunyodkor | Tashkent |
| 18:00 UZT (UTC+5) | J.Elyor 12'; Idiatullin 44' | Summary | Djeparov 33', 58'; Rivaldo 65' | Stadium: Lokomotiv Stadium; Attendance: 4,113; Referee: Alexander Petrov |

| 18 October 2008 24 | Bunyodkor | 1 – 0 | Olmaliq | Tashkent |
| 19:00 UZT (UTC+5) | Soliev 81' | Summary | | Stadium: MHSK Stadium; Attendance: 5,217; Referee: Rustam Saidov |

| 26 October 2008 25 | Dinamo Samarqand | 0 – 4 | Bunyodkor | Samarkand |
| 17:00 UZT (UTC+5) | | Summary | Djeparov 18', 88', 90'; Rivaldo 30' | Stadium: Dinamo Stadium; Attendance: 11,240; Referee: Hakim Sharipov |

| 4 November 2008 26 | Bunyodkor | 1 – 0 | Qizilqum Zarafshon | Tashkent |
| 18:00 UZT (UTC+5) | Pardaev 81' | Summary | | Stadium: MHSK Stadium; Attendance: 4,687; Referee: Yawar Nazhafaliev |

| 9 November 2008 27 | Uz-Dong-Joo | 1 – 4 | Bunyodkor | Andijan |
| 21:00 UZT (UTC+5) | I.Tursunov 6' | Summary | Soliev 19'; Luizão 20'; Rivaldo 68', 90' | Stadium: Soghlom Avlod Stadium; Attendance: 5,584; Referee: Valery Kostrikin |

| 14 November 2008 28 | Bunyodkor | 2 – 0 | Andijan | Tashkent |
| 17:00 UZT (UTC+5) | Djeparov 31'; Soliev 52' | Summary | | Stadium: MHSK Stadium; Attendance: 9,613; Referee: Alexander Petrov |

| 18 November 2008 29 | Neftchi Fargʻona | 2 – 1 | Bunyodkor | Fergana |
| 15:00 UZT (UTC+5) | Ibragimov 18'; Berdiev 37' | Summary | Rivaldo 88' | Stadium: Istiqlol Stadium; Attendance: 15,001; Referee: Rustam Khamidov |

| 23 November 2008 30 | Navbahor Namangan | 1 – 1 | Bunyodkor | Namangan |
| 17:00 UZT (UTC+5) | I.Boydedaev 54' | Summary | Karpenko 60' | Stadium: Markaziy Stadium; Attendance: 17,353; Referee: Valery Kostrikin |

=== Uzbekistan Cup ===
| 23 March 2008 Last 16 1st Leg | Zhayhun | 0 – 2 | Bunyodkor | Urgench |
| 16:00 UZT (UTC+5) | | Summary | Pardaev 67', 87' | Stadium: Olympic Stadium; Attendance: 4,000; Referee: Eldor Shamsiev |

| 14 May 2008 Last 16 2nd Leg | Bunyodkor | 2 – 0 (4 – 0 agg.) | Zhayhun | Tashkent |
| 17:00 UZT (UTC+5) | Pardaev (o.g.) | Summary | | Stadium: MHSK Stadium; Attendance: 3,500; Referee: Hakim Sharipov |

| 17 July 2008 Quarterfinal 1st Leg | Dinamo Samarqand | 0 – 1 | Bunyodkor | Samarkand |
| 17:00 UZT (UTC+5) | | Summary | Villanueva | Stadium: Dinamo Stadium |

| 22 July 2008 Quarterfinal 2nd Leg | Bunyodkor | 1 – 0 (2 – 0 agg.) | Dinamo Samarqand | Tashkent |
| 17:00 UZT (UTC+5) | Haydarov 17' | Summary | | Stadium: MHSK Stadium; Attendance: 3,112; Referee: Valentin Kovalenko |

| 27 July 2008 Semifinal 1st Leg | Olmaliq | 1 – 4 | Bunyodkor | Olmaliq |
| 18:00 UZT (UTC+5) | A.Vostrikov 82' | Summary | Khvostunov 4'; Villanueva 9', 86'; Goçgulyýew 35' | Stadium: Olmaliq Stadium; Attendance: 5,111; Referee: Rustam Khamidov |

| 3 August 2008 Semifinal 2nd Leg | Bunyodkor | 4 – 0 (8 – 1 agg.) | Olmaliq | Tashkent |
| 18:00 UZT (UTC+5) | Bakayev 23'; Kapadze 70'; Djeparov 70'; Villanueva 82' | Summary | | Stadium: MHSK Stadium; Attendance: 4,162; Referee: Marat Ismailov |

==== Final ====
| 31 October 2008 | Bunyodkor | 3 – 1 (a.e.t.) | Pakhtakor Tashkent | Tashkent |
| 20:00 UZT (UTC+5) | Hasanov 40'; Soliev 101', 114' | Summary | Ahmedov 45' | Stadium: Pakhtakor Markaziy Stadium; Attendance: 12,124; Referee: Marat Ismailov |

=== AFC Champions League ===
==== Group stage ====
| Pos | Team | Pld | W | D | L | GF | GA | GD | Pts | Qualification |
|---|---|---|---|---|---|---|---|---|---|---|
| 1 | (Uzbekistan) Bunyodkor | 6 | 4 | 1 | 1 | 8 | 2 | +6 | 13 | Advance to knockout stage |
| 2 | (Saudi Arabia) Al-Ittihad | 6 | 3 | 0 | 3 | 6 | 5 | +1 | 9 | |
| 3 | (Iran) Sepahan | 6 | 2 | 1 | 3 | 5 | 8 | −3 | 7 | |
| 4 | (Syria) Al-Ittihad | 6 | 2 | 0 | 4 | 4 | 8 | −4 | 6 | |

| 12 March 2008 1 | Al-Ittihad (Saudi Arabia) | 1 – 0 | (Uzbekistan) Bunyodkor | Prince Abdullah al-Faisal Stadium, Jeddah |
| | Magno Alves 80' | Report | | Attendance: 7,500; Referee: Yuichi Nishimura (Japan) |

| 19 March 2008 2 | Bunyodkor (Uzbekistan) | 2 – 0 | (Iran) Sepahan | MHSK Stadium, Tashkent |
| | Bakayev 61'; Kapadze 80' | Report | | Attendance: 13,000; Referee: Fareed Al Marzouqi (UAE) |

| 9 April 2008 3 | Al-Ittihad Aleppo (Syria) | 0 – 2 | (Uzbekistan) Bunyodkor | Aleppo International Stadium, Aleppo |
| | | Report | Hasanov 50'; Kapadze 65' | Attendance: 20,000; Referee: Kim Dong-Jin (Korea Republic) |

| 23 April 2008 4 | Bunyodkor (Uzbekistan) | 1 – 0 | (Syria) Al-Ittihad Aleppo | MHSK Stadium, Tashkent |
| | Kapadze 29' | Report | | Attendance: 12,000; Referee: Malik Abdul Bashir (Singapore) |

| 7 May 2008 5 | Bunyodkor (Uzbekistan) | 2 – 0 | (Saudi Arabia) Al-Ittihad | MHSK Stadium, Tashkent |
| | Soliev 10'; Djeparov 38' | Report | | Attendance: 13,000; Referee: Subkhiddin Mohd Salleh (Malaysia) |

| 21 May 2008 6 | Sepahan (Iran) | 1 – 1 | (Uzbekistan) Bunyodkor | Azadi Stadium, Tehran |
| | Ali Mohammadi 2' | Report | Gochguliev 72' | Attendance: 150; Referee: Abdullah Mohamed Al Hilali (Oman) |

==== Knockout stage ====
| 17 September 2008 Quarterfinal, 1st leg | Saipa (Iran) | 2 – 2 | (Uzbekistan) Bunyodkor | Azadi Stadium, Tehran |
| 21:15 UTC+3:30 | Razzaghi-Rad 19'; Rahmati 40' | Report | Villanueva 12'; Rivaldo 20' | Attendance: 40,000; Referee: Saad Kameel Al Fadhli (Kuwait) |

| 24 September 2008 Quarterfinal, 2nd leg | Bunyodkor (Uzbekistan) | 5 – 1 | (Iran) Saipa | MHSK Stadium, Tashkent |
| 16:00 UTC+5 | Villanueva 9' 19' (pen) 52'; Rivaldo 45' (pen); Luizão 68' | Report | Mirghorbani 47' | Attendance: 15,000; Referee: Muhsen Basma (Syria) |

| 8 October 2008 Semifinal, 1st leg | Adelaide United (Australia) | 3 – 0 | (Uzbekistan) Bunyodkor | Hindmarsh Stadium, Adelaide |
| 19:30 UTC+10:30 | Diego 57'; Barbiero 76'; Cristiano 89' (pen) | Report | | Attendance: 16,998; Referee: Sun Baojie (China) |

| 22 October 2008 Semifinal, 2nd leg | Bunyodkor (Uzbekistan) | 1 – 0 | (Australia) Adelaide United | MHSK Stadium, Tashkent |
| 17:30 UTC+5 | Soliev 78' | Report | | Attendance: 17,000; Referee: Ali Hamad Al-Badwawi (United Arab Emirates) |

== Squad statistics ==
As of match played 23 November 2008

=== Appearances and goals ===
| No. | Pos | Nat | Player | Total | | Uzbek League | | Uzbek Cup | | Champions League | |
| No. | Pos | Nat | Player | Apps | Goals | Apps | Goals | Apps | Goals | Apps | Goals |
|---|---|---|---|---|---|---|---|---|---|---|---|
| 2 | DF | (Uzbekistan) UZB | Bakhtiyor Ashurmatov | 20 | 0 | 13 | 0 | 0 | 0 | 7 | 0 |
| 3 | DF | (Turkmenistan) TKM | Goçguly Goçgulyýew | 29 | 4 | 22+1 | 3 | 0 | 0 | 6 | 1 |
| 4 | DF | (Uzbekistan) UZB | Hayrulla Karimov | 21 | 0 | 16+1 | 0 | 0 | 0 | 3+1 | 0 |
| 5 | DF | (Brazil) BRA | Luizão | 15 | 2 | 11 | 1 | 0 | 0 | 4 | 1 |
| 6 | MF | (Brazil) BRA | Rivaldo | 16 | 9 | 12 | 7 | 0 | 0 | 4 | 2 |
| 8 | MF | (Uzbekistan) UZB | Rashidjon Gafurov | 23 | 1 | 8+10 | 1 | 0 | 0 | 1+4 | 0 |
| 9 | MF | (Uzbekistan) UZB | Shavkat Salomov | 24 | 2 | 4+16 | 2 | 0 | 0 | 0+4 | 0 |
| 10 | FW | (Uzbekistan) UZB | Ulugbek Bakayev | 23 | 9 | 10+6 | 8 | 0 | 0 | 4+3 | 1 |
| 12 | GK | (Uzbekistan) UZB | Murod Zukhurov | 15 | 0 | 10 | 0 | 0 | 0 | 5 | 0 |
| 13 | DF | (Uzbekistan) UZB | Aleksandr Khvostunov | 38 | 0 | 27+2 | 0 | 0 | 0 | 8+1 | 0 |
| 14 | DF | (Uzbekistan) UZB | Shavkat Raimqulov | 8 | 0 | 3+1 | 0 | 0 | 0 | 2+2 | 0 |
| 16 | FW | (Uzbekistan) UZB | Anvar Rajabov | 9 | 1 | 2+5 | 1 | 0 | 0 | 0+2 | 0 |
| 17 | FW | (Chile) CHI | José Luis Villanueva | 15 | 10 | 9+2 | 6 | 0 | 0 | 4 | 4 |
| 19 | MF | (Uzbekistan) UZB | Jasur Hasanov | 32 | 2 | 20+4 | 1 | 0 | 0 | 8 | 1 |
| 20 | FW | (Uzbekistan) UZB | Anvarjon Soliev | 31 | 14 | 17+7 | 12 | 0 | 0 | 3+4 | 2 |
| 22 | MF | (Uzbekistan) UZB | Victor Karpenko | 32 | 6 | 21+4 | 6 | 0 | 0 | 6+1 | 0 |
| 23 | DF | (Uzbekistan) UZB | Sakhob Juraev | 22 | 0 | 12+4 | 0 | 0 | 0 | 5+1 | 0 |
| 24 | MF | (Uzbekistan) UZB | Sergey Lushan | 8 | 1 | 2+2 | 1 | 0 | 0 | 1+3 | 0 |
| 25 | GK | (Uzbekistan) UZB | Pavel Bugalo | 25 | 0 | 20 | 0 | 0 | 0 | 5 | 0 |
| 26 | MF | (Uzbekistan) UZB | Azizbek Haydarov | 32 | 2 | 21+1 | 2 | 0 | 0 | 9+1 | 0 |
| 27 | MF | (Uzbekistan) UZB | Anvar Rakhimov | 3 | 0 | 2+1 | 0 | 0 | 0 | 0 | 0 |
| 28 | DF | (Uzbekistan) UZB | Aleksey Nikolaev | 23 | 0 | 15+3 | 0 | 0 | 0 | 5 | 0 |
| 29 | MF | (Uzbekistan) UZB | Timur Kapadze | 33 | 5 | 22+1 | 2 | 0 | 0 | 10 | 3 |
| 30 | MF | (Uzbekistan) UZB | Server Djeparov | 36 | 20 | 26 | 19 | 0 | 0 | 10 | 1 |
| 54 | FW | (Uzbekistan) UZB | Bahodir Pardaev | 12 | 3 | 2+10 | 3 | 0 | 0 | 0 | 0 |
| 55 | MF | (Uzbekistan) UZB | Vyacheslav Ponomarev | 8 | 0 | 3+3 | 0 | 0 | 0 | 0+2 | 0 |
| | MF | (Uzbekistan) UZB | Elyor Jahonov | 1 | 0 | 0+1 | 0 | 0 | 0 | 0 | 0 |
| | FW | (Uzbekistan) UZB | Dmitry Kuzin | 1 | 0 | 0+1 | 0 | 0 | 0 | 0 | 0 |
| | | (Uzbekistan) UZB | Maruf Ahmadjonov | 1 | 0 | 0+1 | 0 | 0 | 0 | 0 | 0 |
Players who left Bunyodkor during the season:
| 18 | MF | (Uzbekistan) UZB | Yannis Mandzukas | 1 | 0 | 1 | 0 | 0 | 0 | 0 | 0 |

=== Goal scorers ===
| Place | Position | Nation | Number | Name | Uzbek League | Uzbekistan Cup | Champions League | Total |
|---|---|---|---|---|---|---|---|---|
| 1 | MF | (Uzbekistan) | 30 | Server Djeparov | 19 | 1 | 1 | 21 |
| 2 | FW | (Uzbekistan) | 20 | Anvarjon Soliev | 12 | 2 | 2 | 16 |
| 3 | FW | (Chile) | 17 | José Luis Villanueva | 6 | 4 | 4 | 14 |
| 4 | FW | (Uzbekistan) | 10 | Ulugbek Bakayev | 8 | 1 | 1 | 10 |
| 5 | MF | (Brazil) | 6 | Rivaldo | 7 | 0 | 2 | 9 |
| 6 | MF | (Uzbekistan) | 29 | Timur Kapadze | 2 | 1 | 3 | 6 |
| 6 | MF | (Uzbekistan) | 22 | Victor Karpenko | 6 | 0 | 0 | 6 |
| 6 | FW | (Uzbekistan) | 54 | Bahodir Pardaev | 3 | 3 | 0 | 6 |
| 9 | DF | (Turkmenistan) | 3 | Goçguly Goçgulyýew | 3 | 1 | 1 | 5 |
| 10 | MF | (Uzbekistan) | 19 | Jasur Hasanov | 1 | 1 | 1 | 3 |
| 10 | MF | (Uzbekistan) | 26 | Azizbek Haydarov | 2 | 1 | 0 | 3 |
| 12 | MF | (Uzbekistan) | 9 | Shavkat Salomov | 2 | 0 | 0 | 2 |
| 12 | DF | (Brazil) | 5 | Luizão | 1 | 0 | 1 | 2 |
| 12 | | | | Own goal | 1 | 1 | 0 | 2 |
| 15 | DF | (Uzbekistan) | 8 | Rashidjon Gafurov | 1 | 0 | 0 | 1 |
| 15 | DF | (Uzbekistan) | 24 | Sergey Lushan | 1 | 0 | 0 | 1 |
| 15 | DF | (Uzbekistan) | 13 | Aleksandr Khvostunov | 0 | 1 | 0 | 1 |
| | | | | TOTALS | 75 | 17 | 16 | 108 |
