= Leomar (footballer) =

Brazilian footballer

Personal information
- Full name: Leomar Francisco Rodrigues
- Date of birth: June 12, 1986 (age 40)
- Place of birth: Campinas, Brazil
- Position: Defender

Team information
- Current team: Caxias

Youth career
- 2000: Guarani
- 2001–2006: Mogi Mirim

Senior career*
Years	Team	Apps	(Gls)
2007–2011	Mogi Mirim		
2008	→ Paulista (loan)		
2008	→ Red Bull Brasil (loan)		
2009	→ Bunyodkor (loan)	1	(0)
2010	→ Fortaleza (loan)		
2011–2013	Naval 1º de Maio	19	(1)
2012–2013	→ Penafiel (loan)	24	(0)
2013	Botafogo de Ribeirão Preto	2	(0)
2014	Arapongas	7	(0)
2014	Icasa	5	(0)
2015	Democrata	8	(0)
2016	União Barbarense	8	(2)
2016–	Caxias		
- * Club domestic league appearances and goals as of 9 March 2016

Leomar Francisco Rodrigues (born June 12, 1987), or simply Leomar, is an association footballer who plays as a defender for Caxias Futebol Clube.

== Club career ==
In August 2009, Leomar moved on loan to Uzbek League side FC Bunyodkor, linking up with fellow Brazilians João Victor, Ratinho and Rivaldo.

In August 2012, Leomar was loaned by Naval 1º de Maio to Penafiel for the 2012–13 season.

In 2013, he transferred to Botafogo SP. In 2014, he played for Arapongas.

== Honors ==
Bunyodkor

- Uzbek League (1): 2009

Fortaleza

- Campeonato Cearense (1): 2010
