= Bakhtiyor Ashurmatov =

Uzbek footballer (born 1976)

Personal information
- Full name: Bakhtiyor Azamovich Ashurmatov
- Date of birth: 25 March 1976 (age 50)
- Place of birth: Kokand, Uzbek SSR, Soviet Union
- Height: 1.84 m (6 ft 0 in)
- Position: Defender

Senior career*
Years	Team	Apps	(Gls)
1994–1997	MHSK Tashkent	62	(1)
1998–1999	Pakhtakor Tashkent	45	(3)
2000	Dustlik Tashkent	30	(3)
2001–2002	Pakhtakor Tashkent	49	(1)
2003	FC Alania Vladikavkaz	6	(0)
2003	FC Torpedo-Metallurg	5	(0)
2004–2005	Pakhtakor Tashkent	32	(4)
2005–2006	Krylia Sovetov Samara	1	(0)
2007–2009	Bunyodkor	44	(0)
2010	Xorazm	13	(1)
2011–2012	Lokomotiv Tashkent		

International career
1997–2008	Uzbekistan	53	(1)

Managerial career
- 2012–2013: FK Guliston
- 2014: Navbahor Namangan
- 2015: Uzbekistan U-22
- 2016: Andijon
- 2018–2019: AGMK
- 2019: Buxoro
- 2019: Surxon Termez
- 2020–2022: Kokand 1912
- 2022: Turon
- * Club domestic league appearances and goals

Bakhtiyor Ashurmatov Uzbek: Baxtiyor Ashurmatov, (born 25 March 1976) is a former player and current manager. He played for the Uzbekistan national team as a defender.

== Playing career ==
Ashurmatov was born in Kokand, Uzbek SSR, Soviet Union. He has made 54 appearances and scored one goal for the full Uzbekistan national football team since his debut in 1997. He has appeared in 22 qualifying matches for the last four World Cups.

== Managerial career ==
Ashurmatov retired from football in 2012, playing the first half of the 2012 season for Lokomotiv Tashkent. After that he started his managing career at FK Guliston. He gained promotion to Uzbek League, finishing 2012 Uzbekistan First League as runners-up.

After 2013 season end he left FK Guliston and in December 2013 joined Bunyodkor coaching staff. On 10 January 2014 he was appointed as head coach of Navbahor Namangan.

On 18 February 2015 Ashurmatov was appointed as new head coach of Uzbekistan U-23 team. He kept his head coach position at Navbahor. With Uzbekistan U-22 he qualified to 2016 AFC U-23 Championship after team finished runners-up in group in qualification tournament played end of March 2015. On 23 June 2015 Ashurmatov was fired from his post at U-22 team.

== Career statistics ==
=== Club ===
As of match played 12 November 2009

Appearances and goals by club, season and competition
Club	Season	League			National cup		Continental		Total	
Club	Season	Division	Apps	Goals	Apps	Goals	Apps	Goals	Apps	Goals
Bunyodkor	2007	Uzbek League	26	0	7	0	–		33	0
Bunyodkor	2008	Uzbek League	13	0	1	0	7	0	21	0
Bunyodkor	2009	Uzbek League	5	0	1	0	2	1	8	1
Bunyodkor	Total		44	0	9	0	9	1	62	1
Career total			44	0	9	0	9	1	62	1

=== International ===
Appearances and goals by national team and year
National team	Year	Apps	Goals
Uzbekistan	1997	4	0
Uzbekistan	1998	1	0
Uzbekistan	1999	2	0
Uzbekistan	2000	6	0
Uzbekistan	2001	13	0
Uzbekistan	2002	2	0
Uzbekistan	2003	5	0
Uzbekistan	2004	8	1
Uzbekistan	2005	3	0
Uzbekistan	2006	0	0
Uzbekistan	2007	5	0
Uzbekistan	2008	4	0
Total		53	1

Scores and results list. Uzbekistan's goal tally first.

#	Date	Venue	Opponent	Score	Result	Competition
1.	9 June 2004	Pakhtakor Markaziy Stadium, Tashkent, Uzbekistan	Palestine	1 – 0	3–0	World Cup qualifier

== Honours ==
=== Player ===
MHSK Tashkent

- Uzbek League (1): 1997
- Uzbek Cup (1): 1995

Pakhtakor

- Uzbek League (4): 1998, 2002, 2004, 2005
- Uzbek Cup (4): 2001, 2002, 2004, 2005

Dustlik

- Uzbek League (1): 2000
- Uzbek Cup (1): 2000

Bunyodkor

- Uzbek League (3): 2007, 2008, 2009
- Uzbek Cup (1): 2008
- AFC Champions League semifinal: 2008

=== Manager ===
FK Guliston

- Uzbekistan First League runners-up (1): 2012
