= Ashurmatov =

Ashurmatov is an Uzbek surname. Notable people with the surname include:

- Bakhtiyor Ashurmatov (born 1976), Uzbek footballer and manager
- Rustam Ashurmatov (born 1996), Uzbek footballer
