= João Victor (footballer, born 1988) =

Brazilian footballer

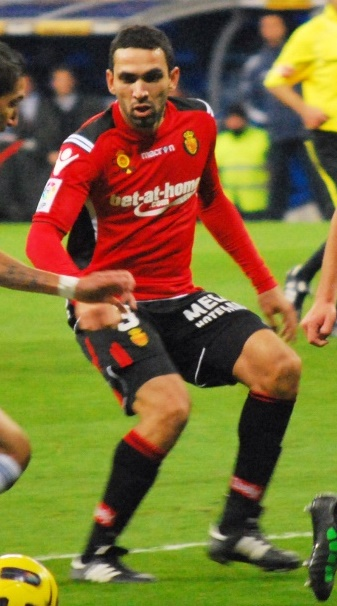
- João Victor playing for Mallorca in 2011

Personal information
- Full name: João Victor de Albuquerque Bruno
- Date of birth: 7 November 1988 (age 38)
- Place of birth: Olinda, Brazil
- Height: 1.81 m (5 ft 11 in)
- Position: Defensive midfielder

Youth career
- 2004–2006: Náutico
- 2007: São Caetano

Senior career*
Years	Team	Apps	(Gls)
2005–2007	Náutico	18	(2)
2007–2008	São Caetano	1	(0)
2008	Treze		
2009	Mogi Mirim	0	(0)
2009–2010	Bunyodkor	40	(3)
2010–2015	Mallorca	86	(1)
2015–2019	Anorthosis	121	(18)
2019–2020	Umm Salal	11	(0)
2020	OFI	11	(0)
2020–2024	Hyderabad	71	(12)
Total		359	(36)

Managerial career
- 2025: Simcoe County Rovers (assistant)
- * Club domestic league appearances and goals

João Victor de Albuquerque Bruno (born 7 November 1988), known as João Victor, is a Brazilian former professional footballer who played as a defensive midfielder.

== Playing career ==
=== Early career ===
Born in Olinda, Pernambuco, João Victor played in his country with Clube Náutico Capibaribe, Associação Desportiva São Caetano and Treze Futebol Clube, helping the first club to promote to Série A in 2006. In 2009, he joined compatriot Luiz Felipe Scolari at Uzbekistan's FC Bunyodkor.

=== Mallorca ===
On 26 August 2010, both João Victor and fellow Brazilian Ratinho – his former teammate at Bunyodkor – signed a five-year deal with RCD Mallorca in Spain, following a successful trial. The former made his La Liga debut on 26 September in a 2–0 home win against Real Sociedad, and finished his first season with 32 games (21 starts) as the Balearic Islands side narrowly avoided relegation.

On 7 October 2012, after just 15 minutes of an eventual 1–2 home loss to Granada CF, João Victor ruptured the cruciate ligament on his right knee, being sidelined for the remainder of the campaign. He remained out of action until July 2014, and renewed his contract at the Iberostar Estadi for two further years on 21 August.

=== Later years ===
João Victor left for Cyprus in the summer of 2015, joining Anorthosis Famagusta FC. He rarely settled with any team or in any country after leaving four seasons later, representing in quick succession Umm Salal SC, OFI Crete F.C. and Hyderabad FC.

With João Victor acting as captain, Hyderabad won the 2021–22 edition of the Indian Super League. He contributed five goals to the feat.

On 9 April 2023, João Victor scored from a penalty in the 2–1 victory over Aizawl FC in the group stage of the Super Cup. He retired at the end of 2023–24, aged 35.

== Coaching career ==
In January 2025, João Victor was named assistant coach at Simcoe County Rovers FC in Canada's League1 Ontario.

== Career statistics ==
Club	Season	League			Cup		Continental		Other		Total	
Club	Season	Division	Apps	Goals	Apps	Goals	Apps	Goals	Apps	Goals	Apps	Goals
Bunyodkor	2009	Uzbekistan Super League	29	3	5 (Note: Appearances in Uzbekistan Cup)	0	7 (Note: Appearances in AFC Champions League)	0	—		41	3
Bunyodkor	2010	Uzbekistan Super League	11	0	5	1	6	0	—		22	1
Bunyodkor	Bunyodkor total		40	3	10	1	13	0			63	4
Mallorca	2010–11	La Liga	32	0	4 (Note: Appearances in Copa del Rey)	0	—		—		36	0
Mallorca	2011–12	La Liga	11	0	5	0	—		—		16	0
Mallorca	2012–13	La Liga	7	0	0	0	—		—		7	0
Mallorca	2013–14	Segunda División	0	0	0	0	—		—		0	0
Mallorca	2014–15	Segunda División	36	1	1	0	—		—		37	1
Mallorca	Mallorca total		86	1	10	0	—				96	1
Anorthosis	2015–16	Cypriot First Division	26	3	2 (Note: Appearances in Cypriot Cup)	0	—		—		28	3
Anorthosis	2016–17	Cypriot First Division	33	4	6	0	—		—		39	4
Anorthosis	2017–18	Cypriot First Division	34	7	4	0	—		—		38	7
Anorthosis	2018–19	Cypriot First Division	28	4	2	1	2 (Note: Appearances in UEFA Europa League)	0	—		32	5
Anorthosis	Anorthosis total		121	18	14	1	2	0			137	19
Umm Salal	2019–20	Qatar Stars League	11	0	5 (Note: Appearances in Qatari Stars Cup)	0	—		—		16	0
OFI	2019–20	Super League Greece	11	0	0	0	—		—		11	0
Hyderabad	2020–21	Indian Super League	17	3	—		—		—		17	3
Hyderabad	2021–22	Indian Super League	21	5	—		—		—		21	5
Hyderabad	2022–23	Indian Super League	14	2	3 (Note: Appearances in Super Cup)	1	1 (Note: Appearance in AFC Cup playoffs)	0	6 (Note: Appearances in Durand Cup)	1	24	4
Hyderabad	2023–24	Indian Super League	19	2	0	0	—		—		19	2
Hyderabad	Hyderabad total		71	12	3	1	1	0	6	1	81	13
Career total			340	34	42	3	16	0	6	1	404	38

== Honours ==
Bunyodkor

- Uzbekistan Super League: 2009, 2010
- Uzbekistan Cup: 2010

Hyderabad

- Indian Super League: 2021–22
