= Edson Ratinho =

Brazilian footballer (born 1986)

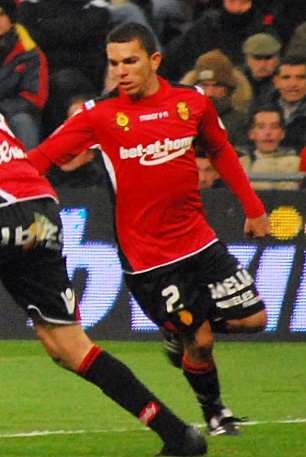
- Ratinho with Mallorca

Personal information
- Full name: Edson Ramos Silva
- Date of birth: 31 May 1986 (age 40)
- Place of birth: João Pessoa, Brazil
- Height: 1.70 m (5 ft 7 in)
- Position: Right-back

Youth career
- 2006: Botafogo-PB

Senior career*
Years	Team	Apps	(Gls)
2007	Mogi Mirim		
2007–2008	AEK Athens	31	(1)
2009	Mogi Mirim	0	(0)
2009–2010	Bunyodkor	42	(2)
2010–2011	Mallorca	7	(0)
2011	→ São Paulo (loan)	1	(0)
2012–2015	Mogi Mirim	80	(10)
2012	→ Internacional (loan)	9	(0)
2013	→ São Caetano (loan)	1	(0)
2014	→ Joinville (loan)	30	(1)
2015–2016	Joinville	31	(0)
2016–2017	Paysandu	21	(0)
2017–2018	CRB	80	(2)
2019	São Bento	10	(0)
2020–2022	Joinville	15	(1)
2022	Santa Cruz		
- * Club domestic league appearances and goals

Edson Ramos Silva (born 31 May 1986), nicknamed Ratinho, is a Brazilian former professional footballer who played as a right back.

His nickname "Ratinho", meaning "little mouse", followed him since his childhood. As an official nickname on his football shirt, it was initiated in 2007 by his mentor at AEK – and his manager since then – Rivaldo, who had an AEK shirt decorated with the name "Edson Ratinho" and offered it to Ramos; ever since then he appears under this name.

== Career ==
=== AEK Athens ===
In 2007, he moved to the Greek Super League side AEK Athens for €350K. He scored for his new side in a match against Levadiakos. Having started his second season at AEK, he asked in October 2008 to leave and immediately departed to Brazil. In January 2009 he brought AEK an offer, thus transferring initially to his late club Mogi Mirim for €350K and subsequently (February 2009) moving on to Uzbekistan and the FC Bunyodkor, following the footsteps of his manager and teammate at AEK Rivaldo, who had taken the same route from AEK to Bunyodkor six months earlier.

=== Mallorca ===
Edson Ramos initially joined RCD Mallorca on trial along with fellow-Brazilian João Victor, playing in Mallorca's team Laudrup make them in the start squad. before Mallorca confirmed both had signed five-year deals on 26 August 2010.

== Career statistics ==
Appearances and goals by club, season and competition
Club	Season	League			National cup (Note: Includes Copa do Brasil, Greek Cup, Uzbekistani Cup, Copa del Rey.)		Continental		Total	
Club	Season	Division	Apps	Goals	Apps	Goals	Apps	Goals	Apps	Goals
Mogi Mirim	2007	Série A2					–	–		
AEK Athens	2007–08	Super League Greece	28	1	2	0	8	0	38	1
AEK Athens	2008–09	Super League Greece	3	0	0	0	2	0	5	0
AEK Athens	Total		31	1	2	0	10	0	43	1
Bunyodkor	2009	Uzbekistan PFL	28	2	5	1	7	0	40	3
Bunyodkor	2010	Uzbekistan PFL	14	0	7	0	0	0	21	0
Bunyodkor	Total		42	2	12	1	7	0	61	3
Mallorca	2010–11	La Liga	16	0	3	0	0	0	19	0
Career total			89	3	17	1	17	0	123	4

== Honours ==
Bunyodkor

- Uzbek League: 2009

Joinville

- Brazilian Série B: 2014
- Copa Santa Catarina: 2020
- Recopa Catarinense: 2021

CRB

- Campeonato Alagoano: 2017
