= Luizão (footballer, born 1987) =

Brazilian footballer

Personal information
- Full name: Luiz Carlos Nascimento Júnior
- Date of birth: 3 January 1987 (age 39)
- Place of birth: Vargem Alta, Brazil
- Height: 1.84 m (6 ft 1/2 in)
- Position: Centre back

Youth career
- 2004–2005: Cruzeiro

Senior career*
Years	Team	Apps	(Gls)
2005–2007	Cruzeiro	30	(2)
2007–2011	Locarno	0	(0)
2007–2008	→ Vasco da Gama (loan)	23	(2)
2008–2009	→ Bunyodkor (loan)	5	(0)
2009–2010	→ Cruzeiro (loan)	0	(0)
2010–2011	→ Bahia (loan)	14	(0)
2012	→ Nacional-MG (loan)	7	(0)
2012	Ceará	23	(2)
2012	Grimsby Town	1	(1)
2013	Nacional-MG	17	(0)
2014	Cabofriense	15	(1)
2015	ABC	16	(0)
2016	Novorizontino	8	(0)
2017	Água Santa	16	(1)
2018	São Bento	32	(3)
2019	Água Santa	15	(0)
2020	Santo André	8	(0)
2020–2021	Ponte Preta	33	(3)
2021	Mirassol	9	(2)
2021	Brusque	4	(2)
2022–2023	Portuguesa	11	(0)
2023–2024	→ Noroeste (loan)	14	(0)
2024	Água Santa	4	(0)
2025	Noroeste	2	(0)

International career
2007	Brazil U20	4	(0)
- * Club domestic league appearances and goals as of 22:26, 9 May 2023 (UTC)

Luiz Carlos Nascimento Júnior (born 3 January 1987), commonly known as Luizão, is a Brazilian footballer who plays as a central defender.

== Club career ==
Luizão was brought up from the Cruzeiro youth squad and made his professional debut for them against Grêmio in a 3–1 home win in the Campeonato Brasileiro on April 23, 2006.

He scored his first professional goal for Cruzeiro against Figueirense in a 2–0 away win in the Campeonato Brasileiro on April 30, 2006.

In July 2007, Luizão was transferred to FC Locarno. Two weeks after he was transferred, not even playing a single game for FC Locarno, Luizão was sent back to Brazil, on loan at Vasco da Gama. He signed for Grimsby Town in 2012 and made 1 appearance for them scoring 1 before getting released.

== International career ==
Luizão played in the 2007 FIFA U-20 World Cup. He played in all four matches that Brazil were involved in. Unfortunately Brazil were eliminated in the quarter final, where Luizão managed to receive his only yellow card of the tournament, in the 116th minute.

== Honours ==
Cruzeiro

- Campeonato Mineiro: 2006
