= José Luis Villanueva =

Chilean footballer (born 1981)

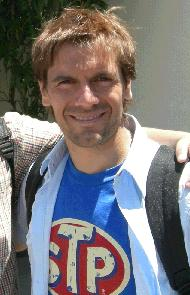

Personal information
- Full name: José Luis Villanueva Ahumada
- Date of birth: November 5, 1981 (age 44)
- Place of birth: Santiago, Chile
- Height: 1.77 m (5 ft 9 1/2 in)
- Position: Forward

Youth career
- Palestino

Senior career*
Years	Team	Apps	(Gls)
2001–2003	Palestino	31	(22)
2001	→ Deportes Temuco (loan)	12	(7)
2002	→ Deportes Ovalle (loan)	36	(20)
2004	Cobreloa	16	(1)
2004–2005	Universidad Católica	36	(16)
2005–2006	Racing Club	31	(7)
2006	Morelia	16	(4)
2007	Ulsan Hyundai Horang-i	3	(1)
2008	Vasco da Gama	5	(0)
2008–2009	Bunyodkor	47	(28)
2010	Tianjin Teda	12	(2)
2011	Universidad Católica	23	(5)
2012	Deportes Antofagasta	8	(1)
2012–2013	Boca Unidos	23	(4)
2013–2015	Magallanes	46	(10)
Total		345	(128)

International career
2001	Chile U20		
2004	Chile U23	6	(2)
2003–2006	Chile	4	(0)
- * Club domestic league appearances and goals

José Luis Villanueva Ahumada (born November 5, 1981) is a Chilean former footballer who played as a forward.

== Club career ==
=== Second Division in Chile ===
In 2001, Chilean first division side Palestino loaned Villanueva out to second division squad Deportes Temuco, where he scored seven goals and helped the club gain promotion to the first division. The following year, instead of returning to Palestino, Villanueva was again loaned out, this time to second division club Deportes Ovalle. In 2002, Villanueva scored 20 goals with Ovalle.

=== Palestino ===
After the 2002 campaign, Villanueva was called to stay with his original team in first division. Villanueva continued his goal-scoring during the 2003 season with Palestino by scoring 22 goals in 34 matches, including in the Pre-Sudamericana Cup. After the season, Palestino once again loaned Villanueva out, this time to Universidad Católica. From 2004 to 2005, Villanueva scored 16 more goals.

=== Out of Chile ===
Palestino sold him to Argentine side Racing Club in 2005 for $600,000, immediately becoming a fan favourite. In a match against Quilmes, Villanueva scored two goals to lead Racing Club to a 4–1 victory. With less than a minute left in the match, Villanueva was substituted off. As he left the pitch, the fans could be heard chanting "shileno, shileno", just how River Plate fans had chanted for Chilean legend Marcelo Salas and Alexis Sánchez years prior.

Villanueva then had spells in South Korea for Ulsan Hyundai in 2007 and in Brazil for Vasco da Gama in 2008 before moving to Uzbekistan. In Tashkent based club Bunyodkor, he played under number 17. During AFC Champions League he couldn't participate in the competition due to the limit of foreign players as Rivaldo, Victor and Ramos were chosen.

== International career ==
Villanueva represented Chile internationally at the under-20 level at the 2001 South American U-20 Championship and under-23 level during the preolympic qualifications in 2004, and represented the adult squad since 2003.

== After football ==
After his retirement, he continued playing football at amateur level for the club Alianza of La Reina. At the same time, he writes a popular "opinion piece" about football in PrensaFútbol.com and works as a football commentator in both TV and radio programs. Currently, he works for both ESPN Chile and Radio Pauta.

Since 2016, he has an undertaking called "The Football Experience" which helps amateur football players to live an experience as a professional footballer, organizing matches around the world.

== Personal life ==
He is married to 30-year-old journalist, Fernanda Bünzli. He likes to travel around the world and he hopes he could write in the future about his experiences. He hopes to end his career with his favorite Chilean squad Universidad Católica and then study a professional career.

== Honours ==
=== Club ===
Bunyodkor

- Uzbek League: 2008
- Uzbek Cup: 2008

Universidad Católica

- Copa Chile (1): 2011
