= Trams in Tashkent =

Coordinates: 41°16′N 69°13′E

Tashkent Tram
- Uzbek: Toshkent tramvayi

- Tatra T6B5 tram on route 13 in 2015

Operation
- Locale: Tashkent, Uzbekistan

Statistics
Horsecar era: 1901–1913
- Status: Converted to electric
- Routes: 3 (Note: Another 2 routes were in progress by 1913, including one that was being planned) (map legend): –––– Railway station–Voskres. bazaar–Taxtapul Gates.; –x–x– Chimkentsky tract–Indigenous bazaar.; –●–●– Starogospitalnaya–Pushkinskaya st.; –-xx-– Line in progress–Cemetery–Voskres. bazaar.; - - - - ○ Planned tram lines. Stations.
- Operators: Tashkent City Duma (1901-1918); Tramways de Taschkent, Empain group (1901-1918)
- Track gauge: 1,000 mm (3 ft 3 3/8 in)
- Propulsion system: Horses
- Depot: № 1-2
Electric tram era: 1912–2016
- Status: Closed
- Routes: 6 (in 2016)
- Operators: Supreme Soviet of the National Economy (1918-1921) Various trests (1921-1992): "Tashgostram" (1921-1926); "Tashgestram" (1926-1931); "Tashkent City Railways" (1931-1938); "Tashkent Tram" (1938-1947); "Tashkent Tram-Trolleybus" (1947-1992); Association "Toshshahartranshizmat" (1992-2016)
- Track gauge: 1,000 mm (3 ft 3 3/8 in) (1912–1968); 1,520 mm (4 ft 11 27/32 in) (since 1936)
- Propulsion system: Electricity
- Electrification: 550 V DC
- Depot: 3
- Track length (double): 87.8 km (in 2016)
New Tashkent era: from 2027
- Status: In construction
- Routes: 3
- Propulsion system: Electricity
- Depot: 1

The Tashkent Tram (Note: Uzbek: Toshkent tramvayi; Russian: Ташкентский Трамвай; French: Tramway de Taschkent) served as a public transport system in Tashkent, Uzbekistan, from commencing line-laying in 1897 until 2016, when the system was closed. The tramway system, established by the city of Tashkent and the Belgian Tramways de Taschkent of the Empain group, was the first and most extensive light rail system in Central Asia.

At its peak, with 146.5 kilometres (91.0 mi) of system length in 1995, it was the largest tram system in Asia. It was the most popular form of public transport in Tashkent in the first half of the 20th century, until its subsequent decline and shift of development towards the Tashkent Metro, which opened in 1977.

The phased closure of tram lines started in 2008, and continued until 2016, when the last lines were demolished. However, a new tram system is in construction in New Tashkent, after President Shavkat Mirziyoyev announced plans to bring it back in 2022.

== Tramways de Taschkent ==
The need for a tram was vocal among the residents of late-19th century Russian Turkestan. In other parts of the Russian Empire, foreign companies started to extensively participate in the construction of new tram systems, with most of the major cities in Europe having a tram system by then. Tramways de Taschkent was a Société Anonyme stock company, one of 23 Belgian tramway companies operating horse-drawn and later electric trams in the Russian Empire, based on concession contracts with local municipalities. The head of the corporation was Édouard Empain, a prominent Belgian industrialist, as it was considered part of the Empain group.

It started in 1892, with Edouard Denis, an engineer representing Empain interests, securing an agreement to form a tramway company in Tashkent. After proposing to share initial expenses to Édouard Otlet and Lazar Polyakov, they had disagreements, including on the tram personnel. After more negotiations a new concession was granted. This allowed for the creation of Tramways de Taschkent four years later, in 1896.

Tramways de Taschkent operated alongside the city administration, initially providing most of the tram carriages. They were manufactured by Belgian companies, including Usines Ragheno, and transported through Europe and the Russian Empire to Tashkent.

== History ==
=== Horsecar ===
Horse-drawn tram lines were mainly built in the 'New City' through places like Pushkin Square, now Mustaqillik Maydoni

The construction of the first line began in 1897, and on 31 March [O.S. 13 April] 1901 the first line was opened. It ran from the Tashkent Train Station towards the Old City. The first Tashkent trams were horse-drawn.

The second line, that was opened in 1903, ran mainly through the New City. The third line was the last line that was horse-drawn, and it opened in 1912.

First lines of the system were built primarily in the Tashkent's "New City" (lit. 'Russian City'), a term for cities built by the Russian Military Government in Turkestan, to separate themselves from the local population, in their "Old Cities".

=== Electrification ===
The lines with horse-drawn trams (left) were gradually converted to be able to carry electric trams (right)

The efforts to bring an electrical tram in Tashkent began in the late 1900s, when a construction of the Tashkent Central tram station started. The station, built by a prominent architect of Tashkent, Wilhelm Heinzelmann, was finished in 1912. It contained a diesel generator to supply electricity to the tram lines, and eventually fully converted to be a part of the electrical grid of the city. Nowadays, after being renovated by the Art and Culture Development Foundation of Uzbekistan, the building houses the Tashkent Centre for Contemporary Arts that opened in 2026.

The first Tashkent electrical tram line opened on the 29 December 1912 [O.S. 11 January 1913], and in 1913 the entire city system was electrified. Kommersant reported in 1914, that the profits of Tramways de Taschkent in 1912 were 269,346 Belgian francs. (Note: Equivalent to around 1,100,000 US Dollars in 2015, adjusted to inflation) Tramways de Taschkent, stopped operating the trams after the outbreak of the First World War, in 1914, when the track length of the system was 19 kilometres (12 mi).

In 1916, the tram stock included 50 motor, 25 trailer and two service cars, and in 1917, the system consisted of 23 kilometres (14 mi) of track. Tramways de Taschkent couldn't build the planned line extensions, due to the inability to deliver materials in the conditions of a World War. The trams that were supposed to be delivered to Tashkent, were reallocated to other cities in Belgium. For example, the cars of the model "Tachkent", made in 1911, were used in Charleroi as high-capacity cars, from 1930 to 1955, becoming part of the local folklore for their uniqueness.

On 10 September 1918, the trams fully stopped operating, because of an oil shortage at the diesel station and poor condition of the majority of the car stock. Two months later, on 10 December, the Tashkent Tram system was nationalized and given to the management of the Supreme Soviet of the National Economy.

The Tashkent Tram system faced challenges in 1920s, due to resource constraints

The system came back to function in 1920, and more development ensued only in late 1920s.

=== Peak operation ===
Izvestia reported in 1933, that the number of passengers of the Tashkent tram in 1932 turned out to be 90 million people. (Note: The population of Tashkent in 1959 was 911,930 people) The tram lines themselves comprised 96 kilometres (60 mi) of track, an increase of 30 kilometres (19 mi) since 1930. The newspaper mentioned that the tram entered well into the Old City, compared to 1915, when "only on the main street, was the microscopic box, named the belgian tram rattling down".

Until 1940s, trams were considered to be practically the only mass type of urban transport in the city. The system coverage reached its peak in 1940, with 100 kilometres (62 mi) of lines.

In 1960s trams from a factory in Riga were brought into the stock. In 1968 all tram tracks in the city were switched to the wide Russian gauge. Izvestia reported again in 1969, that "the day when the tram will have a rival is not far", as the preparatory work for Tashkent Metro had begun at that time.

After Uzbekistan became independent in 1991, the last major growth of the system took place in early 1990s. The system comprised 293 kilometres (182 mi) of track length (146.5 kilometres (91.0 mi) of system length) in 1995. Demolition of parts of the system and entire lines ensued in the following years, as the tram and trolleybus systems were seen as the inferior level of transport to the metro.

=== Decline and closure ===
As the Tashkent Metro extended through the city, starting in early 2000s the tram routes near the lines of metro were demolished. The full closure of the system happened in phases, and from 2008 until 2016 a major portion of the remaining routes were destroyed. By 2016 the network consisted of six routes of 87.8 kilometres (54.6 mi) of track length, a decline from the tram system's peak number of 24 routes.

The map of the remaining lines that were set to be demolished in 2016.

On 28 March 2016, Tashkent Mayor Rakhmonbek Usmonov announced that the system would fully close by the end of the year. The gained space was be used for additional road space, which the city authorities hoped to reduce traffic congestion. Shadow bus routes, to the previous tram lines, were introduced afterwards. The operating company Tashgorpastrans planned to sell the 30 KTM-19s and 20 Vario LF trams, which it acquired in 2007 and 2011, respectively.

The system was closed on 2 May 2016. Some of the Vario LF trams were later sent to be used by the Samarkand tram system, which opened in 2017.

The discontinuation of the tram service gained much criticism from the public, even before it was carried out. BBC reported that "many residents lamented the decision", with some posting on social media that it will cause Tashkent to loose some of its character, and that the decision will be regretted by Tashkent's authorities. The official information page by the Administration of the City of Tashkent included that trams and trolleybuses in Tashkent were discontinued "as a part of the transport reform".

=== Plans to return trams ===
In February 2022, the President of Uzbekistan, Shavkat Mirziyoyev announced that the tram system will return to Tashkent. The French company Alstom signed agreements to cooperate with the City Administration in building the new tram system. Initially, Alstom was set to construct a 9.1 km line in Tashkent, however, this was subsequently postponed.

The website for New Tashkent states that there are plans to construct 3 tram lines (T1-T3), including a map, released in 2026. The exact routes have not yet been confirmed.

Planning of the new tram system began in 2025, with a feasibility study by local authorities and a roadmap, developed together with the French Ministry of Foreign Affairs. Kun.uz, an Uzbek media-outlet, reported that the roadmap "was inked" by Sharof Rahmonov, Deputy Mayor of Tashkent, and Laurent Saint-Martin, then France’s Minister Delegate for Foreign Trade and Citizens Abroad.

== New Tashkent Tram ==
The new tram system is set to be built in the New Tashkent district of the city. The official website for the project of the new district includes three tram routes (T1-T3) and one tram depot planned for the development.

== Gallery ==
Diagram showing the electric motor Tashkent tram, made in a Ragheno factory in 1911

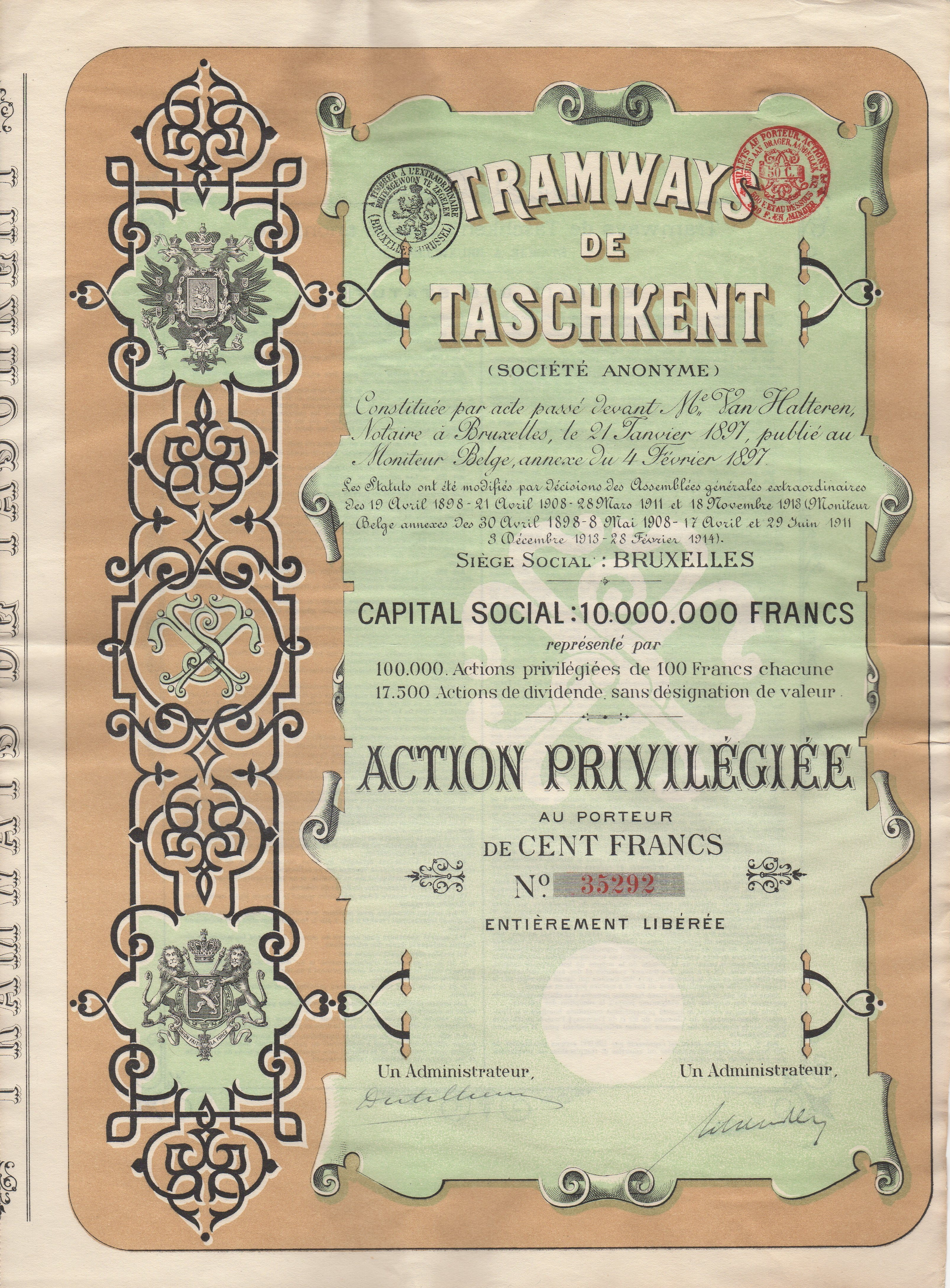
Share of Tramways de Taschkent in 1914.

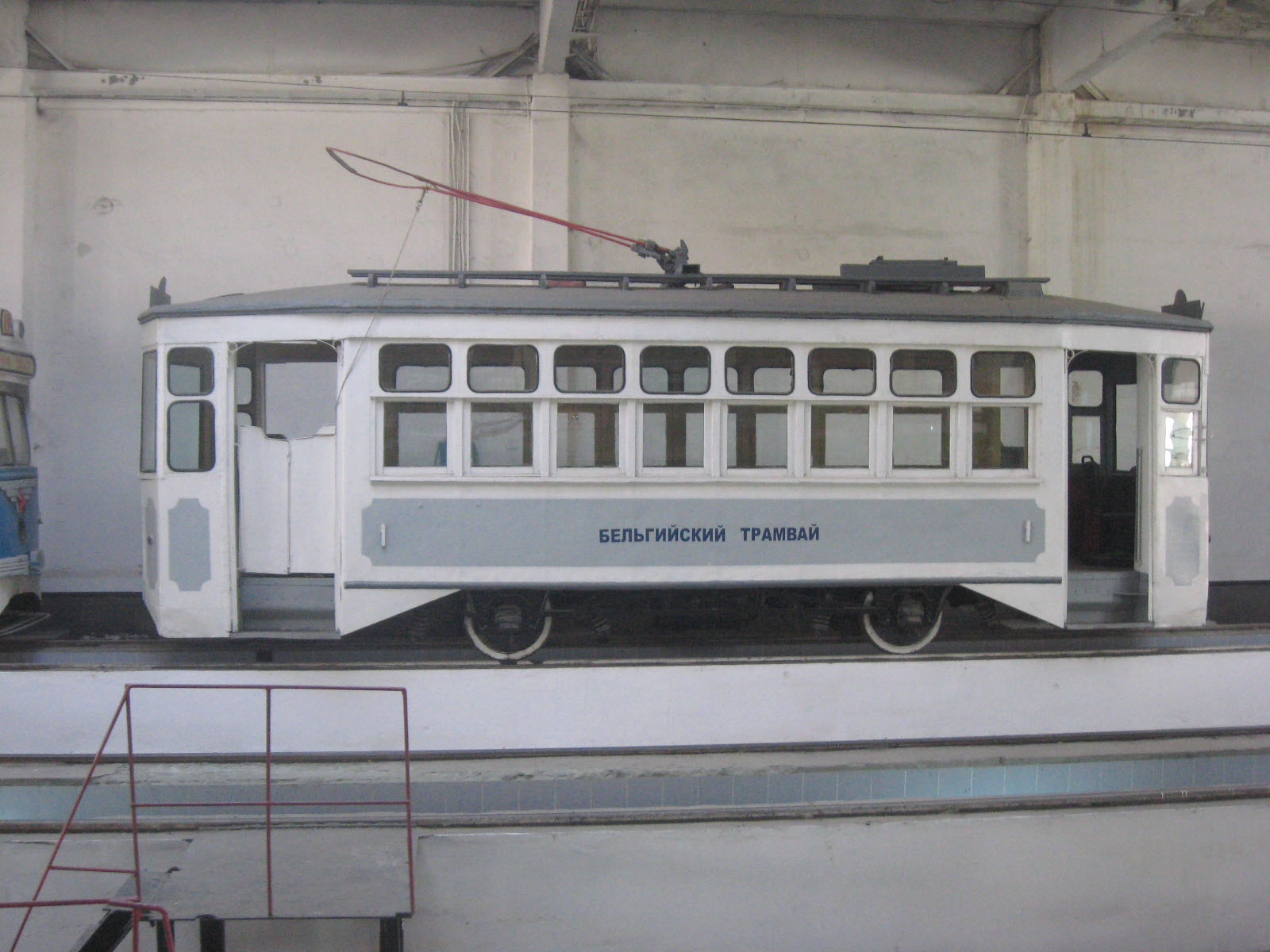
"Belgian tram" at the Museum of Electrotransport in Tashkent, in 2009.

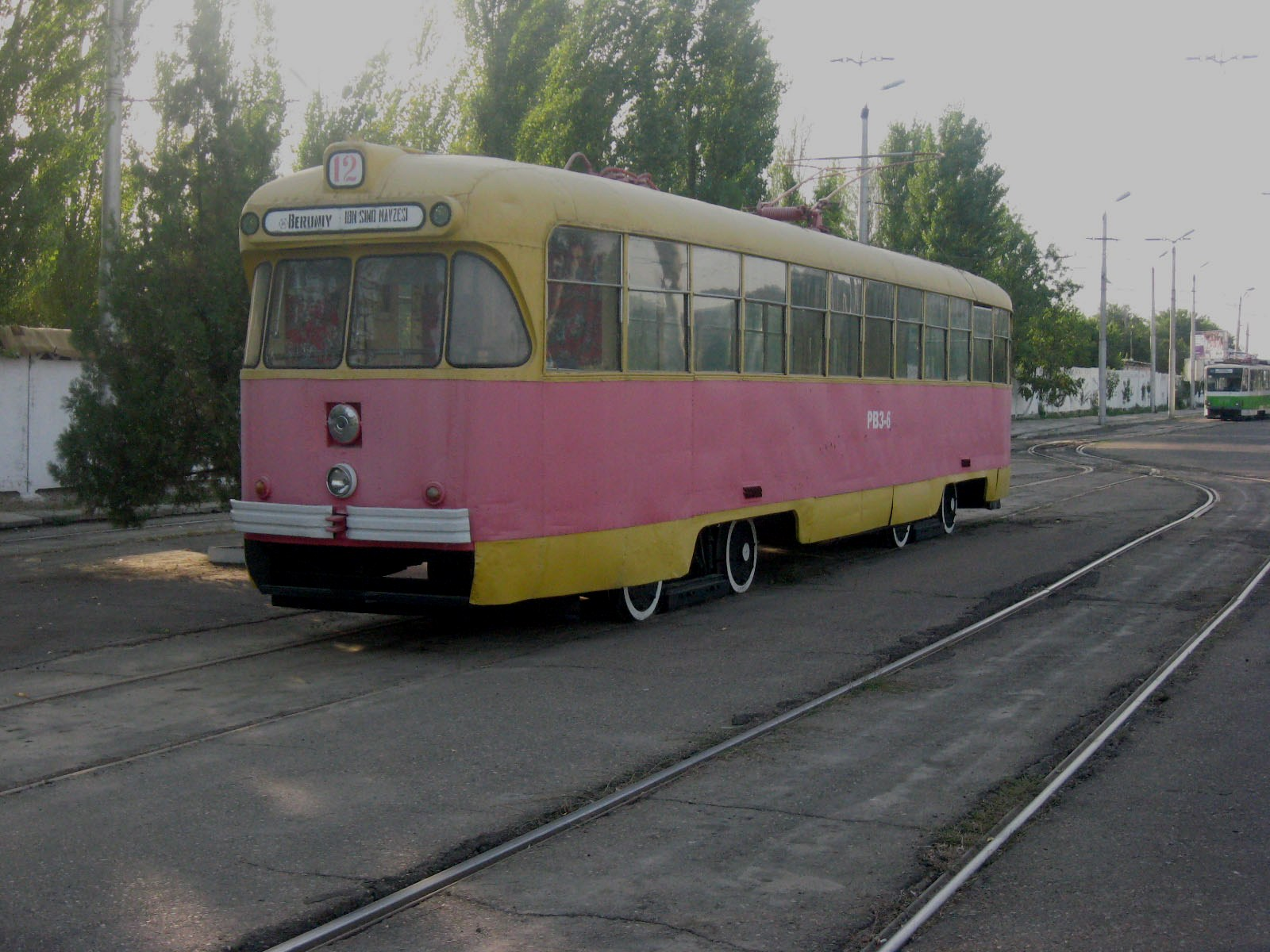
A museum RVR-6 at the Tram Depot №2 in 2009.

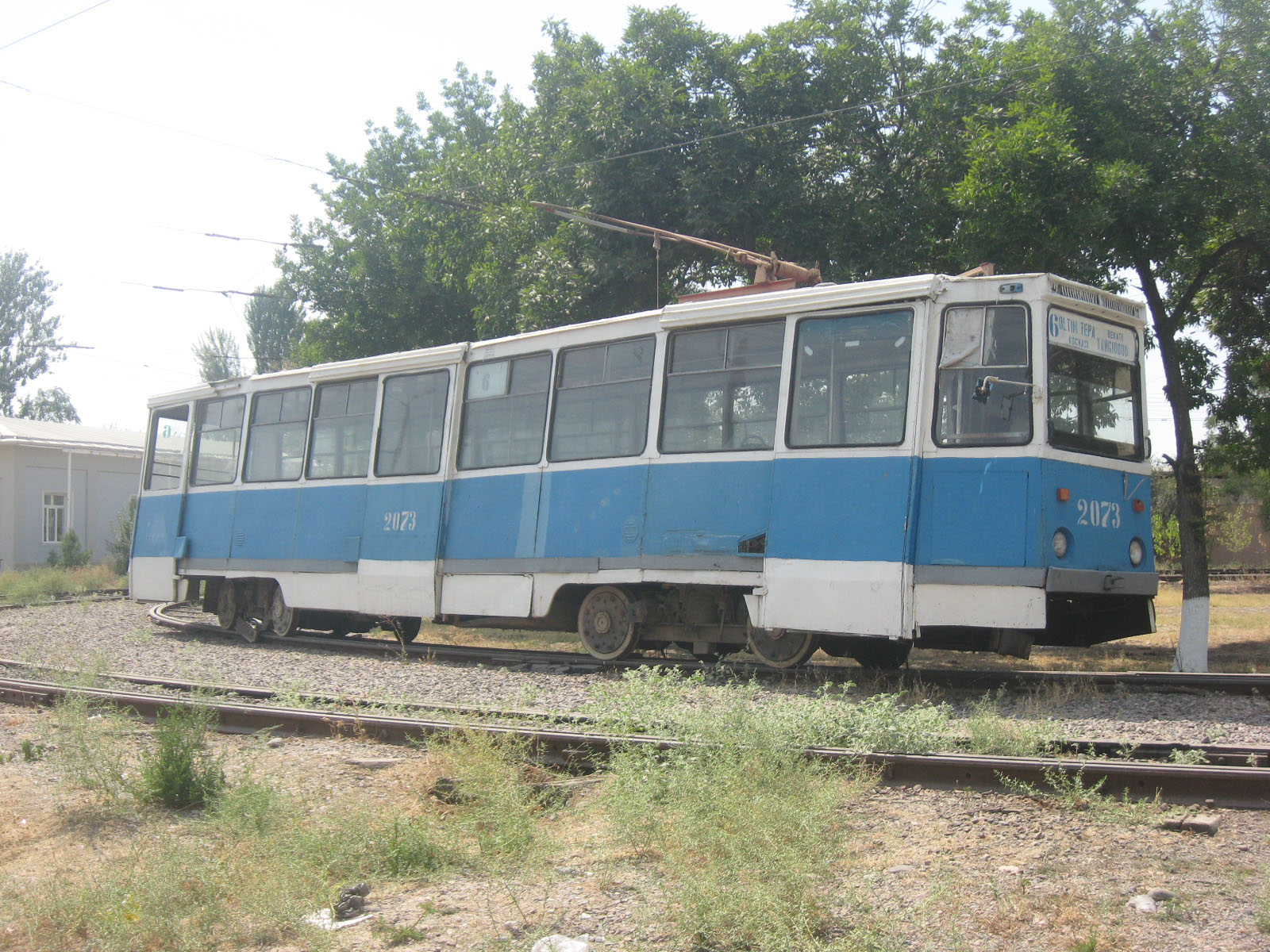
KTM-5 tram in 2009.

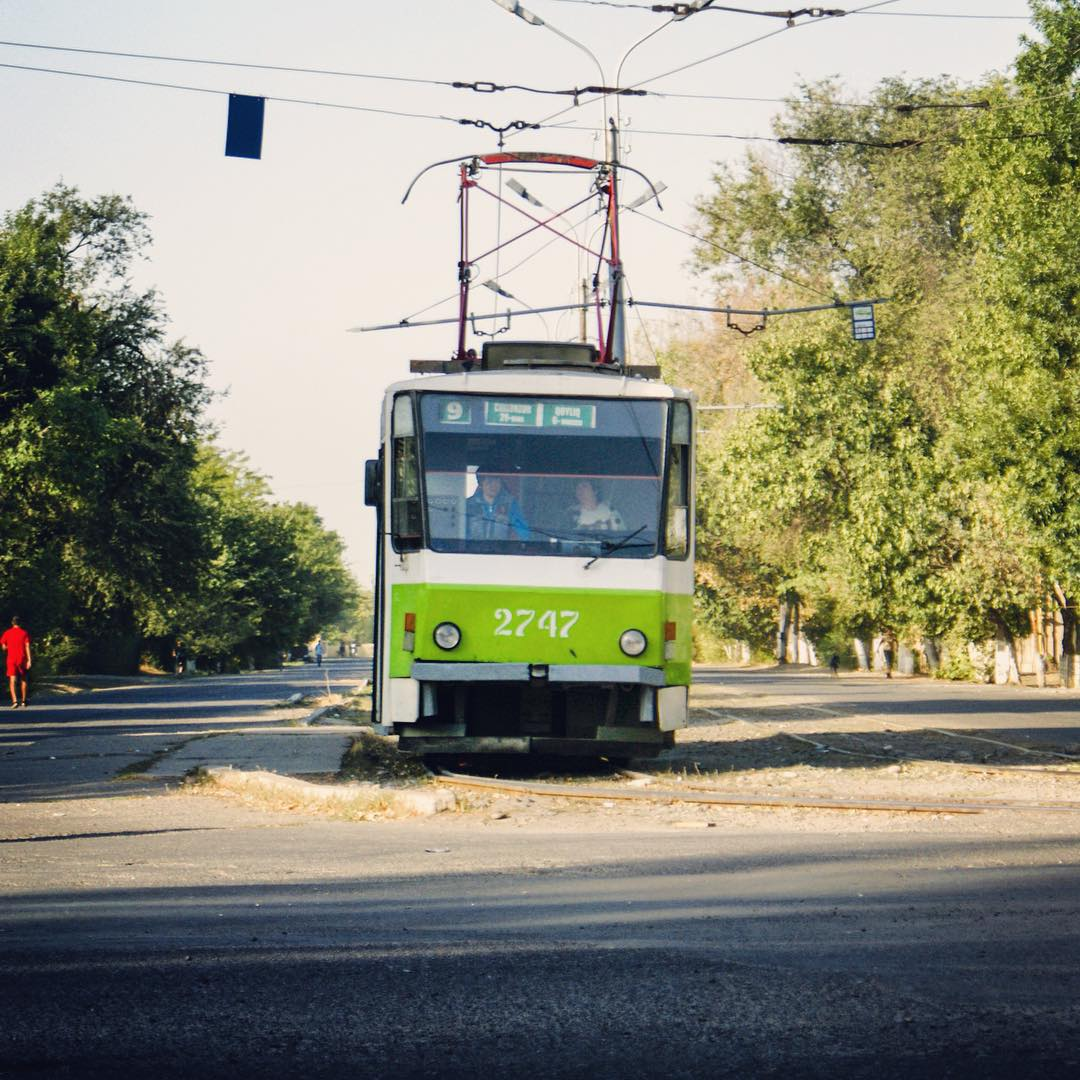
Tatra T6B5 tram on route 9 in 2015.

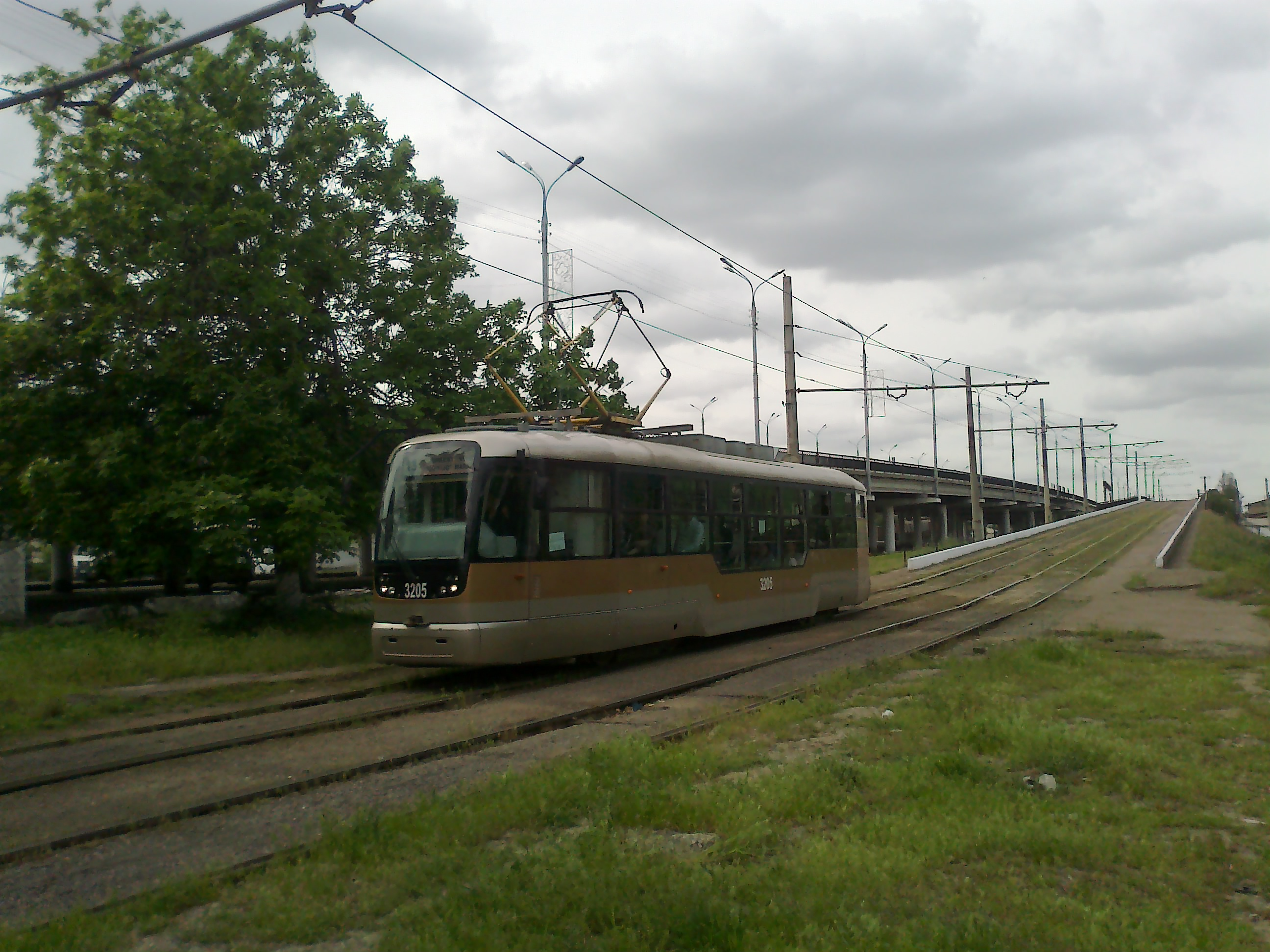
A Vario LF tram in 2016.

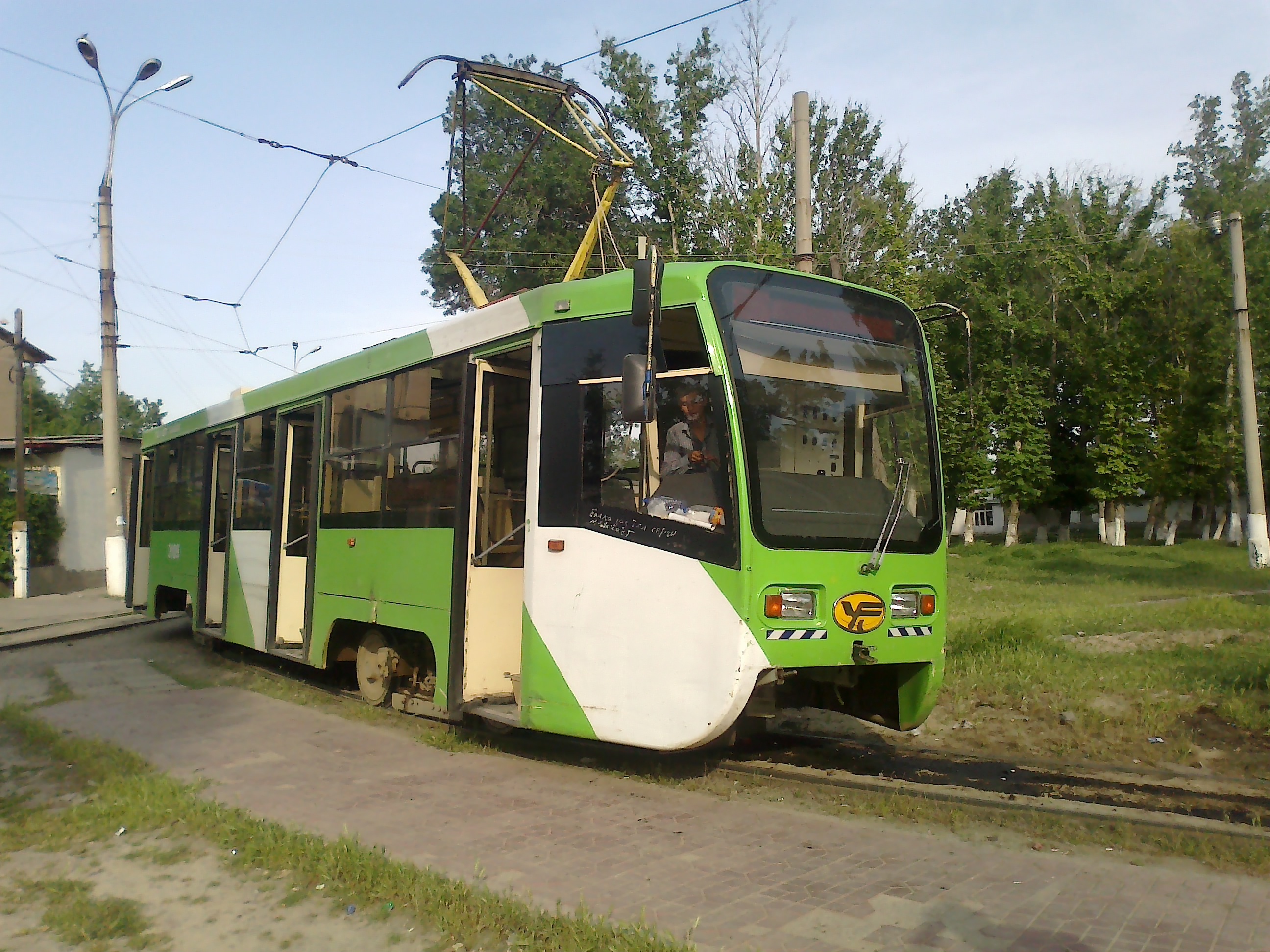
KTM-19 in 2016, a few days before the full closure of the system.

== See also ==
- Tashkent Metro
- Trolleybuses in Tashkent
- Trams in Samarkand
- List of town tramway systems in Asia
