= List of football stadiums in Uzbekistan =

The following is a list of football stadiums in Uzbekistan, ordered by capacity. The minimum capacity is 5,000. The largest non-football stadium in Uzbekistan is the 12,000-capacity indoor stadium named Humo Arena in Tashkent, the home of ice hockey clubs Binokor Tashkent and Humo Tashkent.

== Current stadiums ==
#	Image	Stadium	Capacity	City	Home team	Sport
1		Pakhtakor Central Stadium	35,000	Shaykhontohur, Tashkent	Uzbekistan national football team, Pakhtakor FC	Football
2		Milliy Stadium	34,000	Chilanzar, Tashkent	Uzbekistan national football team, FC Bunyodkor	Football
3		Buxoro Arena	22,700	Bukhara	FK Buxoro	Football
4		Kosonoy Stadium	22,000	Kosonsoy	FK Kosonsoy	Football
5		Markaziy Stadium	22,000	Namangan	PFC Navbahor Namangan	Football
6		Markaziy Stadium	21,000	Qarshi	Nasaf Qarshi	Football
7		Istiqlol Stadium	20,500	Fergana	FC Neftchi Fergana	Football
8		Bobur Arena	18,360	Andijan	FK Andijon	Football
9		Dinamo Samarkand Stadium	16,000	Samarkand	FC Dinamo Samarqand	Football
10		Metallurg Bekabad Stadium	15,000	Bekabad	PFK Metallurg Bekabad	Football
11		Xorazm Stadium	13,500	Tashkent	FC Khorazm	Football
12		Yoshlar Stadium	12,500	Navoiy	Qizilqum FC	Football
13		Olimpiya	12,500	Samarkand	FC Sherdor	Football
14		Olympic City Stadium	12,000	Tashkent	Uzbekistan national football team	Football
15		AGMK Stadium	12,000	Olmaliq	FC AGMK	Football
16		Sogdiana Stadium	11,650	Jizzakh	FC Sogdiana Jizzakh	Football
17		Bahrom Vafoev Stadium	11,000	Muborak	FK Mash'al Mubarek	Football
18		Qarshi Geolog Stadium	11,000	Qarshi	Lochin Qarshi	Football
19		Surkhon Arena	10,600	Termez	FC Surkhon	Football
20		Kokand Markaziy Stadium	10,500	Kokand	FC Kokand 1912	Football
21		Turan Stadium	9,300	Nukus, Karakalpakstan	FC Aral Nukus	Football
22		JAR Stadium	8,500	Shaykhontohur, Tashkent	FC Obod	Football
23		Dustlik Stadium	8,000	Dustlik	FC Olympic MobiUz	Football
24		G'uzor Stadium	8,000	Gʻuzor	FC Shurtan Guzar	Football
25		Lokomotiv Stadium	8,000	Tashkent	PFC Lokomotiv Tashkent	Football
26		Spartak Stadium	8,000	Khiva	FK Khiva	Football
27		Uzbekistan Stadium	8,000	Yaypan	FC Turon	Football
28		Atlaschi Stadium	7,500	Margilan	FK Atlaschi	Football
29		Progress Stadium	5,000	Zarafshan	FC Qizilqum Zarafshon	Football
30		TSTU Stadium	6,000	Tashkent	Lokomotiv BFK	Football

== Future stadiums ==
#	Image	Stadium	Capacity	City	Home team	Sport
1		New Tashkent Stadium	55,000	New Tashkent	Uzbekistan national football team	Football
2		Bukhara Arena	30,000	Bukhara	FC Bukhara	Football

== See also ==
- Football in Uzbekistan
- List of Asian stadiums by capacity
- List of association football stadiums by capacity
- Lists of stadiums
