= New Tashkent Stadium =

Stadium in Tashkent, Uzbekistan

- Yangi Toshkent Arena (Uzbek)
- Interactive map of New Tashkent Stadium
- Full name: New Tashkent Stadium
- Location: Tashkent, Uzbekistan
- Coordinates: 41°16′12.4″N 69°28′30″E
- Owner: Government of Uzbekistan
- Operator: Uzbekistan Football Association
- Capacity: 55,000
- Surface: Hybrid Grass
- Field size: 105 m × 68 m (344 ft × 223 ft)

Construction
- Groundbreaking: 11 November 2025; 11 months ago
- Built: 2025–
- Opened: 2027 (expected)
- Cost: $100 million
- Architects: Bahadır Kul Architects and KOÇ Construction

Tenant
- Uzbekistan national football team

The New Tashkent Stadium, Uzbek: Yangi Toshkent Arena is the future national stadium of Uzbekistan, located in the New Tashkent District of its capital city, Tashkent. Its total seating capacity of 55,000 makes it the largest football stadium in Uzbekistan and also the largest stadium in Central Asia.

The New Tashkent Stadium is officially set to serve as a primary host venue for the 2027 FIFA U-20 World Cup. The 55,000-seat capacity world-class stadium is also a prime candidate to host the tournament's final match.

== Construction History ==
=== Planning and groundbreaking ===
On 18 March 2023, President Shavkat Mirziyoyev laid the foundation stone for New Tashkent itself. At this stage, the stadium had not yet been announced as a specific project.

On 2 October 2025, FIFA decided that the 2027 FIFA U-20 World Cup would be held in Uzbekistan and Azerbaijan. The tournament's semifinals and final require a stadium with more than 40,000 seats, providing the immediate need for a large new venue.

On 11 November 2025, a groundbreaking ceremony was held for the stadium in New Tashkent. President Shavkat Mirziyoyev attended the ceremony and placed a capsule in the foundation, officially marking the beginning of construction. The stadium was planned with a seating capacity of 55,000 and an estimated construction cost of US$100 million.

=== Structural advancement ===
By March 2026, earthworks had been completed and approximately 95% of the foundation had been poured. The planned stadium was designed as a six-storey facility meeting FIFA requirements, with three training pitches and approximately 5,500 parking spaces. A metro station was also planned near the stadium.

By July 2026, construction was reported to be 65% complete. The stadium is planned to serve as the main venue for the 2027 FIFA U-20 World Cup in Uzbekistan, including the tournament's final matches.

== Design ==
The stadium is designed as a six-storey football stadium with a seating capacity of 55,000 spectators. It is being constructed in accordance with FIFA requirements and is intended to serve as one of the principal sporting venues of New Tashkent.

The stadium's design incorporates modern architectural elements with references to Uzbek national traditions. The project also emphasizes the use of green energy, smart management systems and integration with the surrounding urban environment.

The complex will include facilities for spectators, players and media, as well as more than ten escalators to facilitate movement throughout the building. Three training pitches will be located within the stadium complex.

A parking facility with a capacity of approximately 5,500 vehicles is planned near the stadium, while a metro station is planned in the vicinity to provide public transport access. The stadium is being developed as part of the wider infrastructure of New Tashkent.

The venue is planned to be covered, allowing it to host football matches and other events in different weather conditions.

== See also ==
- Football in Uzbekistan
- List of football stadiums in Uzbekistan
- List of future stadiums
