= Sergei Pryakhin (ice hockey) =

Russian ice hockey player (born 1963)

- Born: December 7, 1963 (age 62) Moscow, Soviet Union
- Height: 6 ft 3 in (191 cm)
- Weight: 209 lb (95 kg; 14 st 13 lb)
- Position: Right wing
- Shot: Left
- Played for: Krylya Sovetov Moscow; Calgary Flames; Zürcher SC; Kiekko-Espoo; Oji Eagles
- National team: Soviet Union and Russia
- NHL draft: 252nd overall, 1988; Calgary Flames
- Playing career: 1980–2000
Medal record
Representing Soviet Union
Men's ice hockey
World Junior Championship
Gold medal – first place	1983 Soviet Union
World Championship
Silver medal – second place	1987 Austria
Gold medal – first place	1990 Switzerland

Sergei Vasilievich Pryakhin (sometimes Priakin; Russian: Сергей Васильевич Пряхин; born December 7, 1963) is a Russian former ice hockey forward who played 20 seasons in several leagues. He is a former captain of Krylya Sovetov Moscow (Soviet Wings) of the Soviet League and was the first Soviet hockey player permitted to play in the National Hockey League (NHL), and the second Soviet player to appear in an NHL game, following Victor Nechayev. He joined the Calgary Flames in 1989 and played parts of three seasons in the NHL. Pryakhin returned to Europe in 1991 where he spent three seasons in Switzerland with Zürcher SC, then four in Finland with Kiekko-Espoo. He also played with the Oji Eagles in Japan for one year before returning to Kryla for a final season before retiring in 2000.

Internationally, Pryakhin was a member of the Soviet national team. He appeared in two World Junior Championships and won a gold medal in 1983. He was a member of two World Championship teams, winning a silver medal in 1987 and gold in 1990. Pryakhin was also a member of the second-place Soviet team at the 1987 Canada Cup.

== Playing career ==
Pryakhin's top-level career began in 1980 when he appeared in one Soviet League for Krylya Sovetov Moscow (better known in North America as the Soviet Wings). He joined the team full-time in 1981–82 as a 17-year-old, appearing in 43 games for the Wings. Pryakhin's debut with the Soviet national team came the 1982 World Junior Hockey Championship in a fourth-place finish. He returned for the 1983 tournament and scored six points in seven games to help the Soviets win the gold medal.

A mid-level player on both the Wings and the national team, Pryakhin's best seasons in the Soviet league came in 1983–84 when he scored 18 goals, and 1986–87 when he had 32 points. He ultimately rose to become captain of the Wings. He was a member of a Soviet squad that won a silver medal at the 1987 World Championship and finished as runners-up to Canada at the 1987 Canada Cup.

The National Hockey League (NHL)'s Calgary Flames, anticipating that it would be easier to convince the Soviet Hockey Federation to release a non-star member of their national team to play in North America, opted to select Pryakhin with the 252nd, and last, pick in the 1988 NHL entry draft. The Soviets began negotiations with the Flames in February 1989, and he signed a contract with Calgary on March 29. He became the first Soviet player permitted by his national federation to play in the NHL. Pryakhin made his NHL debut on March 31 against the Winnipeg Jets. He was the second Soviet player to appear in an NHL game, following Victor Nechayev. Pryahkin appeared in the Flames' final two games of the regular season, and one game of the 1989 playoffs as the Flames went on to win the Stanley Cup. He did not play enough games or in the finals so his name was left off the Cup. Calgary did give Pryakhin a Stanley Cup ring and included him in the team picture.

Pryahkin scored his first NHL goal on October 10, 1989, against the New Jersey Devils. He appeared in 20 games with the Flames in 1989–90 and scored 2 goals and 4 points. He added 1 goal and 6 assists in 24 games in 1990–91 and made appearances with the Salt Lake Golden Eagles, Calgary's International Hockey League affiliate in both seasons. Internationally, Pryahkin appeared in three games and won a gold medal with the Soviet team at the 1990 World Championship.

Returning to Europe in 1991–92, Pryahkin joined Zürcher SC of the Swiss top division. He was a member of the team for three seasons, splitting 1992–93 with Krylya Sovetov in his Russian home, before moving on to the Finnish SM-liiga for four seasons with Kiekko-Espoo. Pryahkin spent a season in Japan in 1998–99 before closing out his career with Krylya Sovetov in the Russian second division in 2000.

== Career statistics ==
=== Regular season and playoffs ===
			Regular season					Playoffs
Season	Team	League	GP	G	A	Pts	PIM	GP	G	A	Pts	PIM
1979–80	Krylya Sovetov Moscow	Soviet	1	0	0	0	0	—	—	—	—	—
1980–81	Krylya Sovetov Moscow	Soviet	1	0	0	0	0	—	—	—	—	—
1981–82	Krylya Sovetov Moscow	Soviet	43	4	5	9	23	—	—	—	—	—
1982–83	Krylya Sovetov Moscow	Soviet	35	11	9	20	18	—	—	—	—	—
1983–84	Krylya Sovetov Moscow	Soviet	44	18	13	31	24	—	—	—	—	—
1984–85	Krylya Sovetov Moscow	Soviet	32	14	9	23	10	—	—	—	—	—
1985–86	Krylya Sovetov Moscow	Soviet	39	12	13	25	16	—	—	—	—	—
1986–87	Krylya Sovetov Moscow	Soviet	40	12	20	32	18	—	—	—	—	—
1987–88	Krylya Sovetov Moscow	Soviet	44	10	15	25	16	—	—	—	—	—
1988–89	Krylya Sovetov Moscow	Soviet	44	11	15	26	23	—	—	—	—	—
1988–89	Calgary Flames	NHL	2	0	0	0	2	1	0	0	0	0
1989–90	Calgary Flames	NHL	20	2	2	4	0	2	0	0	0	0
1989–90	Salt Lake Golden Eagles	IHL	3	1	0	1	0	—	—	—	—	—
1990–91	Calgary Flames	NHL	24	1	6	7	0	—	—	—	—	—
1990–91	Salt Lake Golden Eagles	IHL	18	5	12	17	2	—	—	—	—	—
1991–92	Zürcher SC	NDA	42	21	25	46	24	7	4	4	8	2
1992–93	Krylya Sovetov Moscow	RUS	20	4	4	8	10	—	—	—	—	—
1992–93	Zürcher SC	NDA	23	12	5	17	12	4	2	1	3	4
1993–94	Zürcher SC	NDA	29	19	15	34	20	—	—	—	—	—
1994–95	Kiekko-Espoo	SM-l	50	13	20	33	49	4	1	4	5	0
1995–96	Kiekko-Espoo	SM-l	49	9	24	33	53	—	—	—	—	—
1996–97	Kiekko-Espoo	SM-l	50	15	25	40	53	4	0	0	0	2
1997–98	Kiekko-Espoo	SM-l	46	11	24	35	24	8	3	3	6	0
1998–99	Oji Eagles	JPN	19	6	10	16	—	—	—	—	—	—
1999–2000	Krylya Sovetov Moscow	RUS II	23	4	5	9	14	—	—	—	—	—
Soviet totals			343	96	103	199	158	—	—	—	—	—
NHL totals			46	3	8	11	2	3	0	0	0	0
SM-l totals			195	48	93	141	179	16	4	7	11	2

=== International ===
Year	Team	Event	Result	GP	G	A	Pts	PIM
1981	Soviet Union	EJC	1st place, gold medalist(s)	5	4	2	6	4
1982	Soviet Union	WJC	4th	7	2	1	3	4
1983	Soviet Union	WJC	1st place, gold medalist(s)	7	2	4	6	13
1987	Soviet Union	WC	2nd place, silver medalist(s)	8	0	2	2	8
1987	Soviet Union	CC	2nd	9	0	2	2	6
1990	Soviet Union	WC	1st place, gold medalist(s)	3	0	1	1	2
Junior totals				19	8	7	15	21
Senior totals				20	0	5	5	16
