= Usines Ragheno =

The Usines Ragheno (Ragheno Factories) were a rolling stock manufacturer, building vehicles for railways and tramways. They are located in Mechelen, Belgium.

== History ==
A first factory was founded in 1851 William Ragheno (1820-1867) from Brussels, being called Établissements Ragheno (Ragheno Establishments). The factory contained a blacksmith's workshop and built carriages for the Belgian railways. William Ragheno was the son of Pierre Ragheno, mechanical engineer for the Belgian State railways.

On June 17, 1899 the Société anonyme des usines Ragheno was opened (having workshops for the construction of railway and tramway equipment and carriages) hoping to develop production capabilities for foreign markets.

The company would build railway and tramway rolling stock until 1975. It merged with Groupe BAT (Bruxelloise d'Auto-Transport) to form Ragheno Beherman Auto-Transport in 1979.

The company also built locomotives between 1919 and 1925.

== Rolling stock built by Usines Ragheno ==
- Motorcars for tramways in Tours, Montpellier, Oran, Biarritz.
- Locomotives for the chemin de fer de Malines à Terneuzen (7 units) virtually identical to Type 32 EB (030) in 1923.
- Locomotives for the chemins de fer de l'État belge (15 units), Type 23 (040T), in 1926.
- Series 46 (SNCB) : 20 self-propelled Type 554 vehicles in 1952.
- I2 carriages for the SNCB in 1951.

== Photo gallery ==
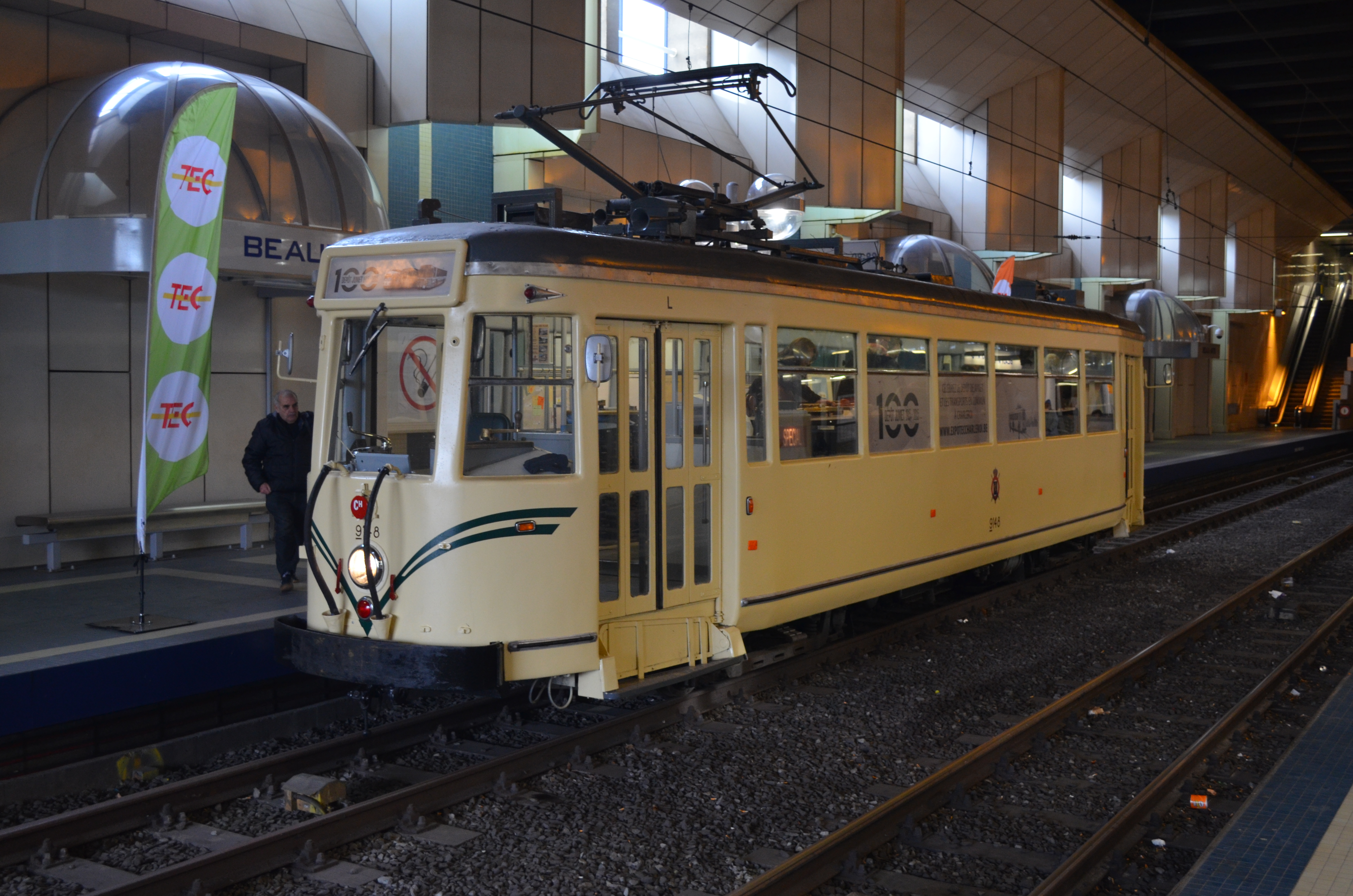
Standard unit 10272 from 1938. Transformed to Type-S in 1958 and Type-SM in 1975. Became number 9148 on January 1, 1976.

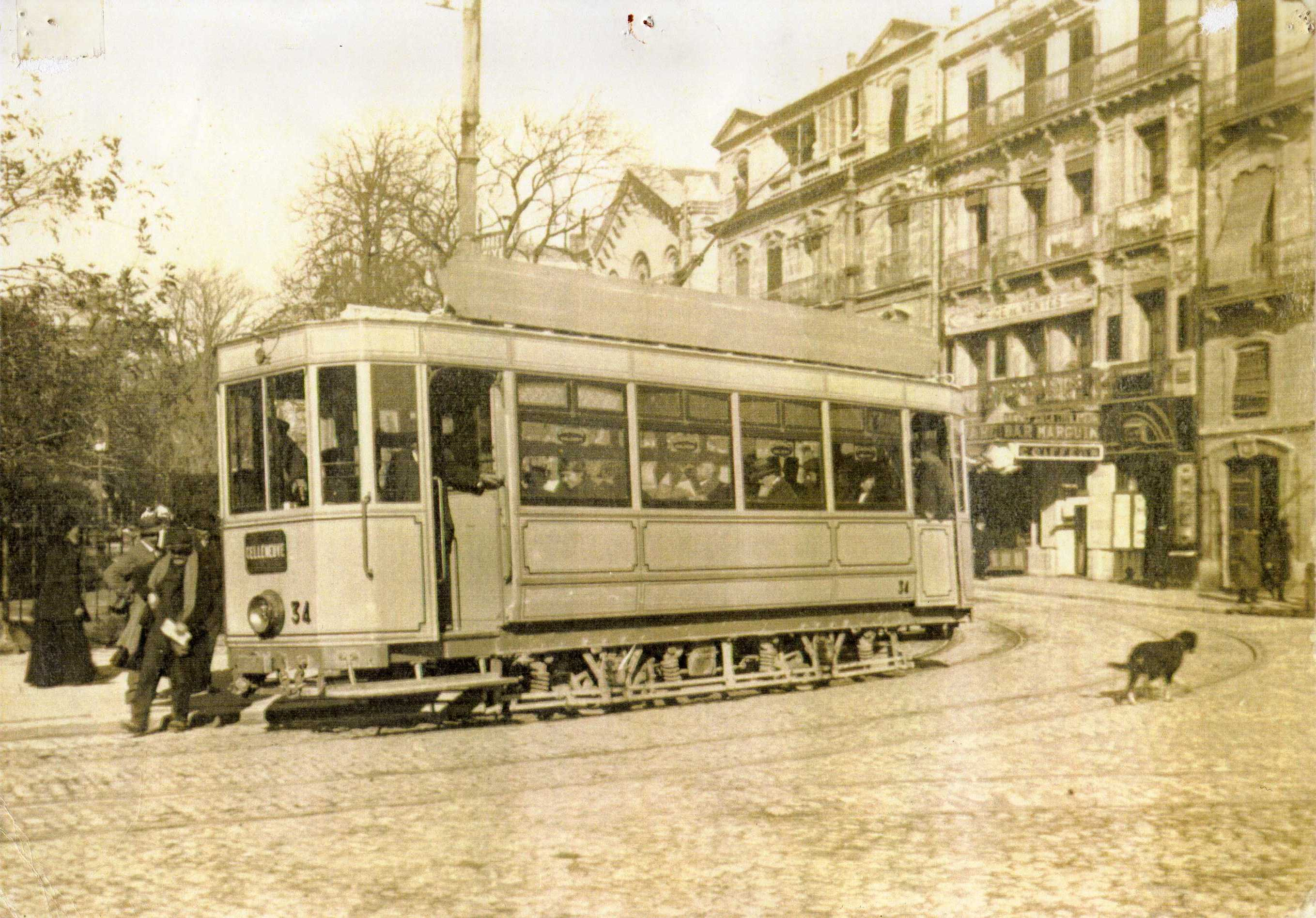
Ragheno self-propelled motorcar in Montpellier.

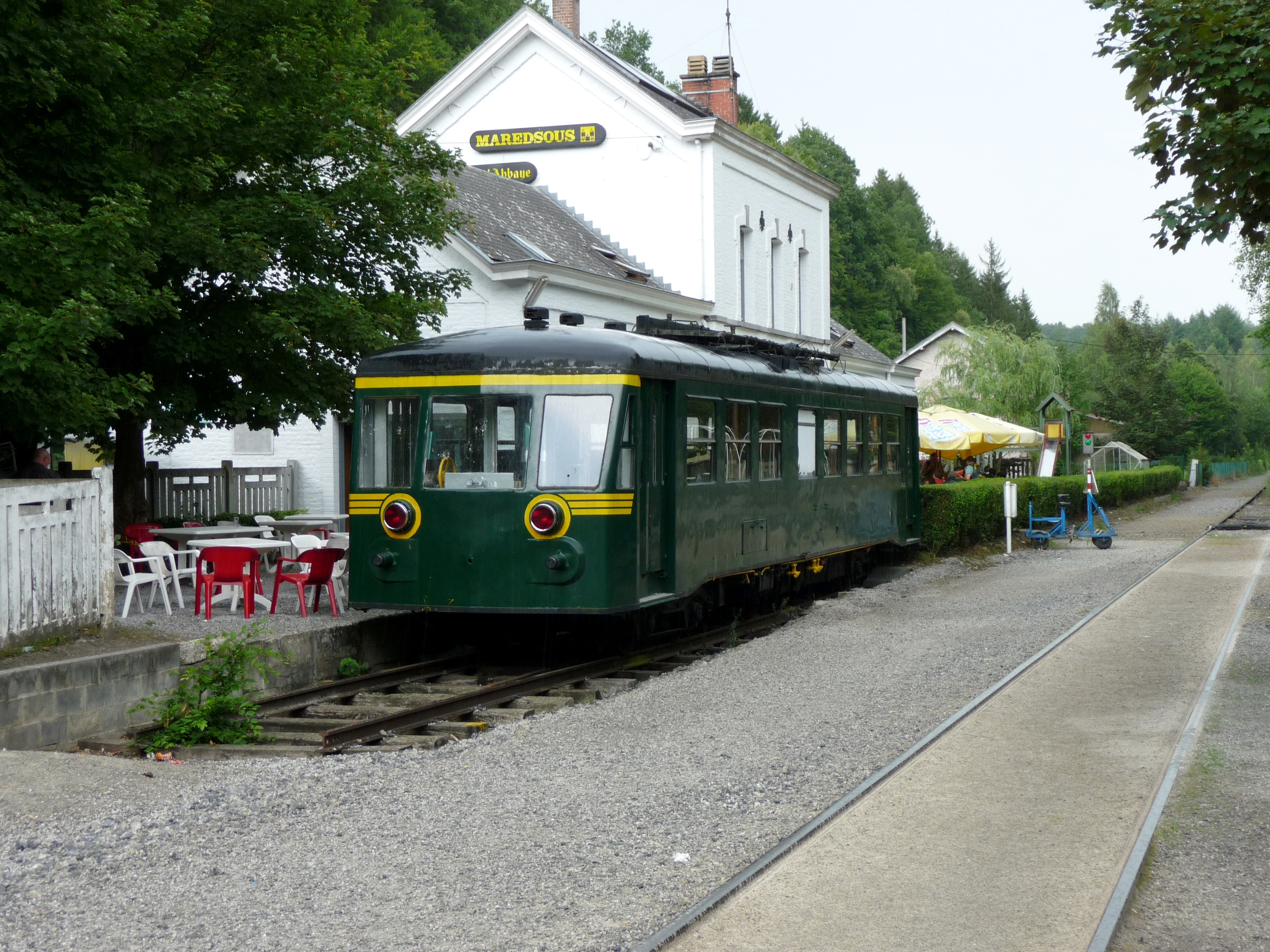
Ragheno motorcar NMBS/SNCB 4614.
