= Trams in Samarkand =

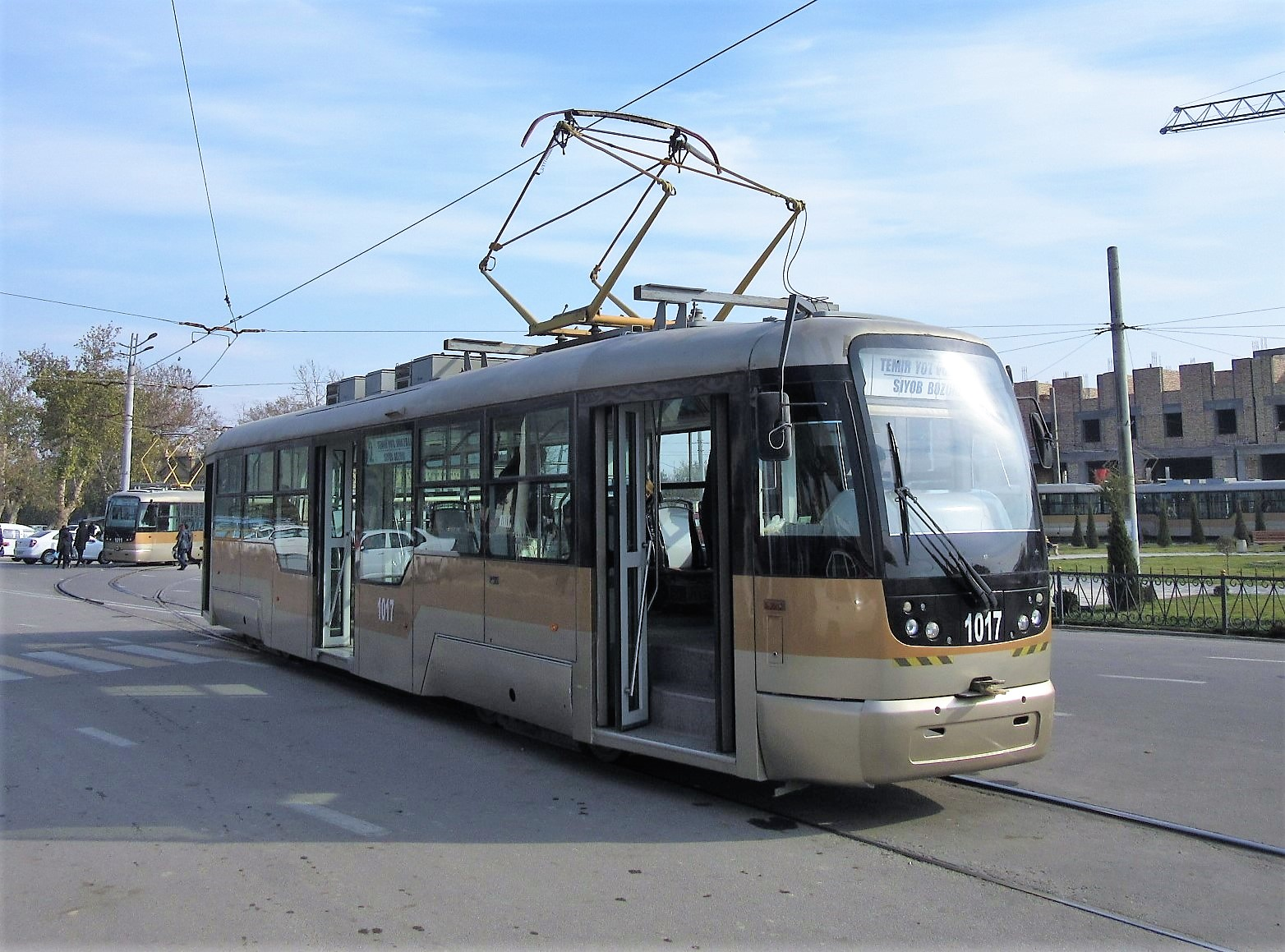
- Vario LF tram in Samarkand

Operation
- Locale: Samarkand, Uzbekistan
- Open: 29 March 2017
- Status: Operational
- Lines: 2
- Owner: Uzbek Railways

Infrastructure
- Propulsion system: Electric
- Electrification: Overhead
- Stock: Pragoimex Vario LF

Statistics
- Route length: 11.4 km (7 mi)
- Stops: 26
Steam era: 1923–1947
- Status: Converted to electricity
- Propulsion system: Steam
Soviet electric era: 1947–1973
- Status: Disestablished
- Lines: 1
- Propulsion system: Electric
- Stock: KTM/KTP-1
- Route length: 11.4 km (7 mi)
Overview

The tram system of Samarkand, Uzbekistan, consists of two lines operated by Uzbek Railways, with a total of 26 stops and a length of 11.4 kilometers.

The modern, electrified system opened its first line in 2017, and is the first system to operate in Samarkand since the Soviet-era system was closed down in 1973. Another two lines are planned for the future, to make a total of four lines.

== History ==
The first trams in Samarkand began operation in 1924 and were powered by steam.

In 1947, the tram system transitioned from steam to electric power. A fleet of 30 vehicles served the system until 1973, when it was dismantled. The last of Samarkand's guided transport was disestablished in 2005, when the trolleybus system (operating from 1957) was removed.

In 2016, Uzbek presidential candidate Shavkat Mirziyoyev promised that a new tram line would be built in Samarkand, and construction began upon his election. Despite complaints from the local population over the effects of construction on traffic and the demolition of buildings to make way for the tram, the project finished on schedule. The first system line began operation in March 2017, with Mirziyoyev as its first passenger.

The system's original stock of Pragoimex VarioLF trams were taken from Tashkent, whose tram project had been abandoned the year before. Later, Samarkand purchased 42 of these trams directly from Czech company Pragoimex.

A second tram line opened the following year, along with eight new trams.

== Infrastructure and operation ==
The lines are double-tracked throughout. Because the vehicles acquired from Tashkent are single-ended trams, turning loops have been built at the termini, with each loop having a passing track. Platforms are only available at these points. Otherwise, passengers must board on the roadway along the tracks, which are located in the median of multi-lane roads. Stops are often made on request outside of designated stops to compete with marshrutkas (minibuses). During peak hours, conductors are employed. At other times, passengers must disembark at the driver's station and pay the fare. Both lines operate from 6:00 AM to 11:00 PM. On Line 1, ten services operate during the day at 6-minute intervals, while on Line 2, three services operate at 20-minute intervals (as of 2024). Speeds of up to 45 km/h are reached on straight sections (as of 2020).

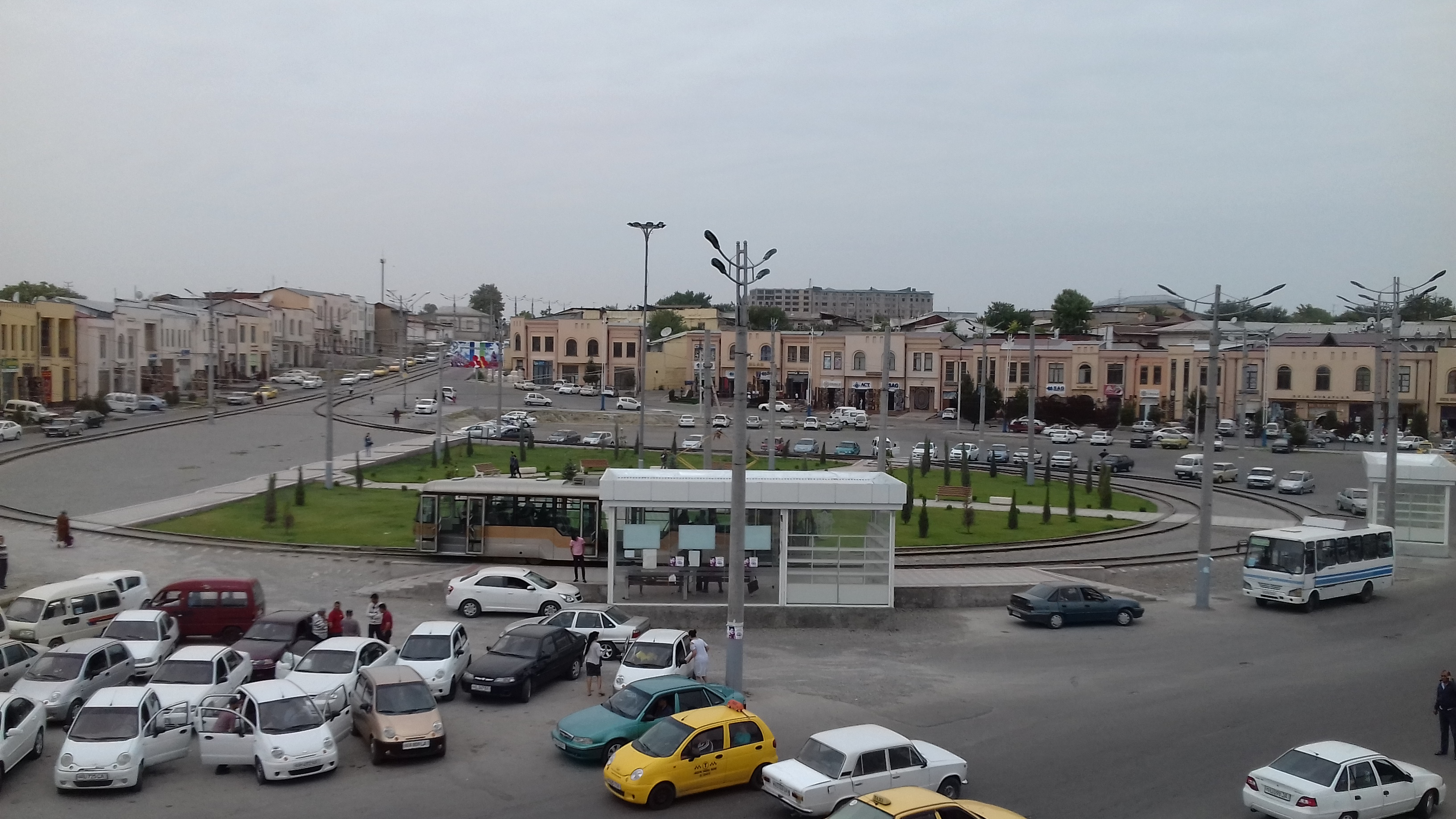
A tram loop near the main train station.

At the depot, the car and maintenance hall (as of 2024) is not yet connected to the rail network, so the vehicles must be parked outdoors. Vehicles used in regular service are parked overnight in the turning loop at the main station, where maintenance and repairs are also carried out. The depot is only connected via a single track, which was originally intended as an entry track. The exit track had been built, but it had such a sharp bend that it was unusable and was subsequently demolished.

== Current lines and future plans ==
Samarkand is currently served by two tram lines. The system has an average headway of seven to nine minutes, and one journey from end to end takes about 20 minutes on each line. Two more lines are in the planning phase; the four lines will total 34.8 km in length.

== See also ==
- Trams in Tashkent
- List of town tramway systems in Asia
