= Humo Arena =

Indoor arena in Tashkent, Uzbekistan

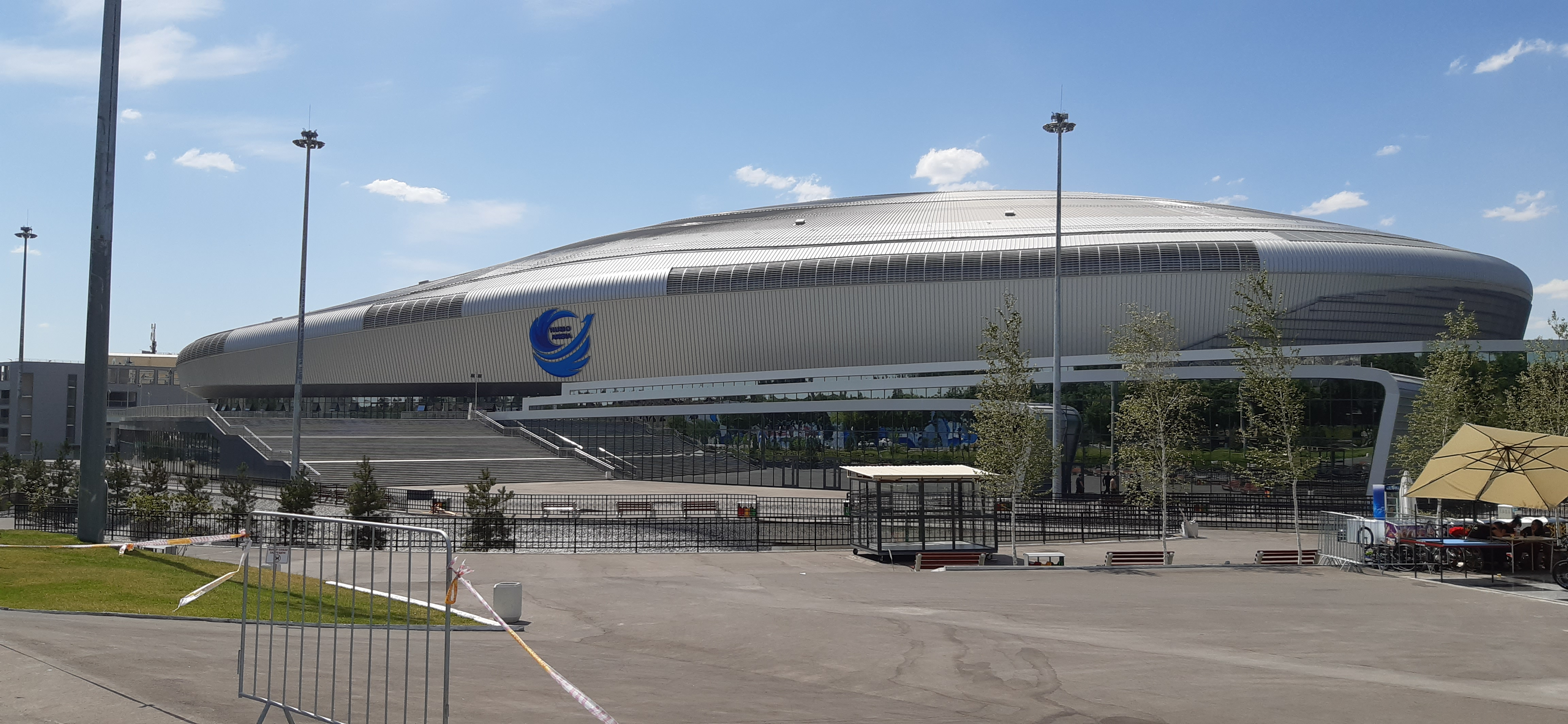
- Interactive map of Humo Arena
- Address: Afrosiab st, Chilanzar, Tashkent
- Location: Tashkent, Uzbekistan
- Coordinates: 41°18′28″N 69°15′06″E
- Operator: Wind Rose
- Capacity: 12,500
- Public transit: O'zbekiston; 13, 51, 196

Construction
- Opened: 15 March 2019
- Cost: €175 mln

Tenants
- HC Binokor; Humo Tashkent

Website
- www.humoarena.com

The Humo Arena, also known as Ice Dome Tashkent or Humo Ice Dome, (Uzbek: «Humo Arena» muz majmuasi) is a multifunctional indoor arena located in Tashkent, Uzbekistan. Humo Arena is the biggest hockey arena in Central Asia with a capacity of 12,500 and the second after the Belarusian Minsk Arena in the CIS.

The hall will be able to change the placement of seats depending on the sporting event being held. The main arena also provides for matches in basketball, volleyball, handball, futsal, boxing, taekwondo, short track, figure skating and curling competitions, as well as concerts.

== History ==
The construction of the first indoor professional Ice Palace in Tashkent started in February 2017. According to project documentation the arena has 12,500 capacity. According to the designers, the project is described as resembling the shape of the Humo bird, a symbol of happiness and freedom. Current members of Toldy Construct team also contributed to this project. They helped to realize specialised construction and design elements of the facade and roof. The sidewalks of the whole complex will be designed to form the wings of Humo. The arena is planned to be commissioned in March 2019. The opening ceremony of ice dome took place on 15 March 2019.

== Structure and facilities ==
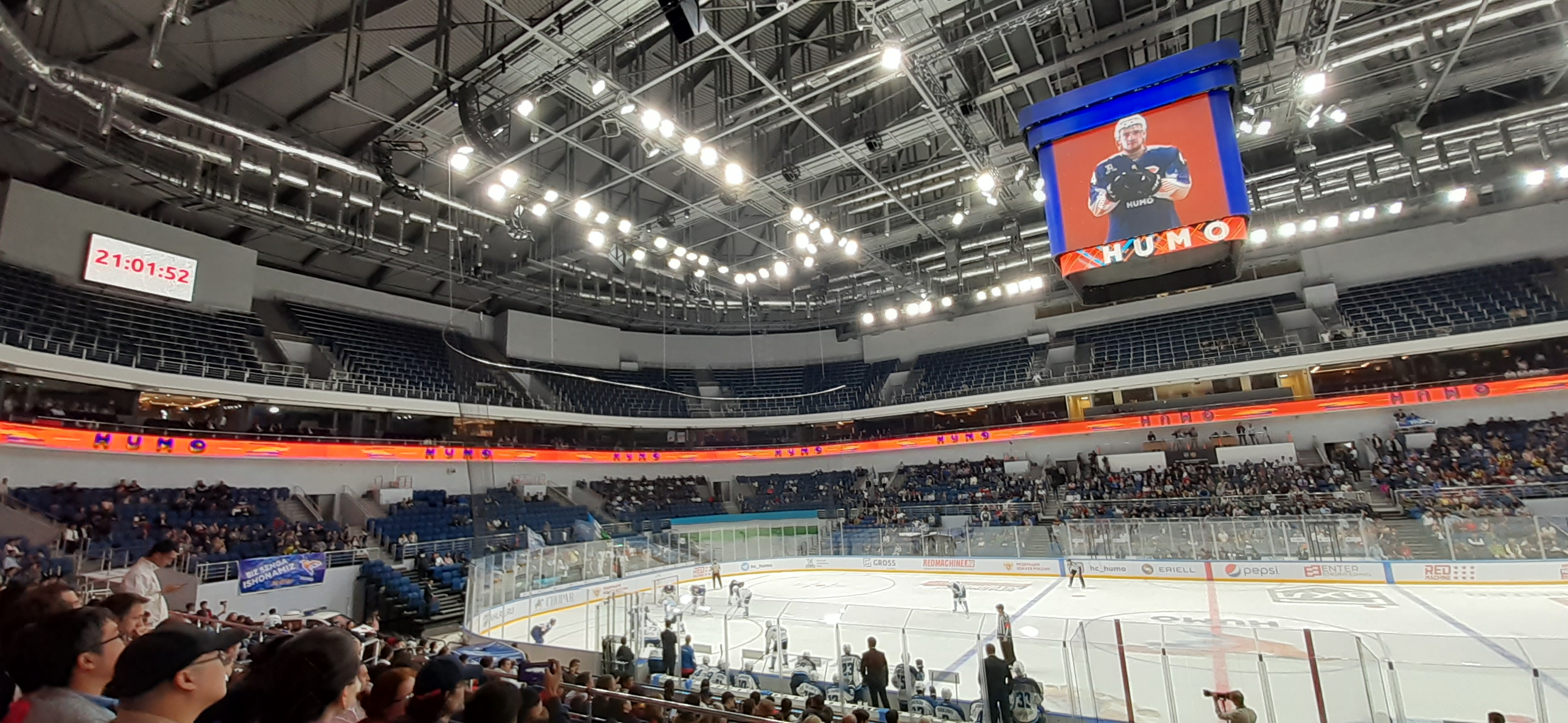
Humo First Play

Ice Dome with area of 74 thousand square meters will have 2 complexes: training and the main arena. The rink of main arena will be 30x60 meters and planned to be used for ice-hockey matches. Indoor arena can be used for other sports such basketball, volleyball, handball, futsal etc. In concert configuration palace will hold 10,000 spectators.

The Humo multifunctional complex also includes sporting museum, gyms, catering service facilities, fitness centre and 4 level parking lot.

The corridors of the complex are decorated with panels of the artist Bobur Ismailov. GAZ-13 and GAZ-14 "Chaika" cars are installed in the "Humo Arena" hall.

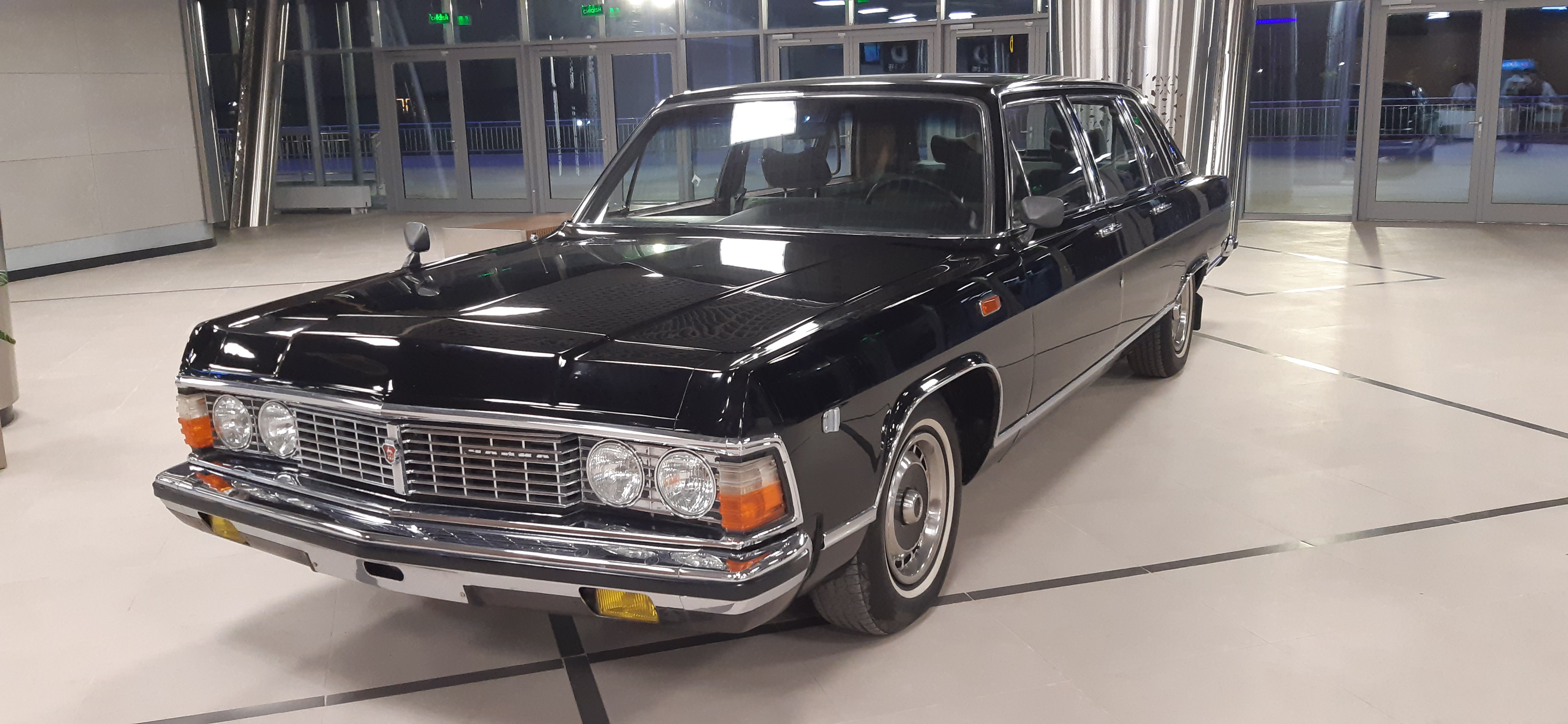

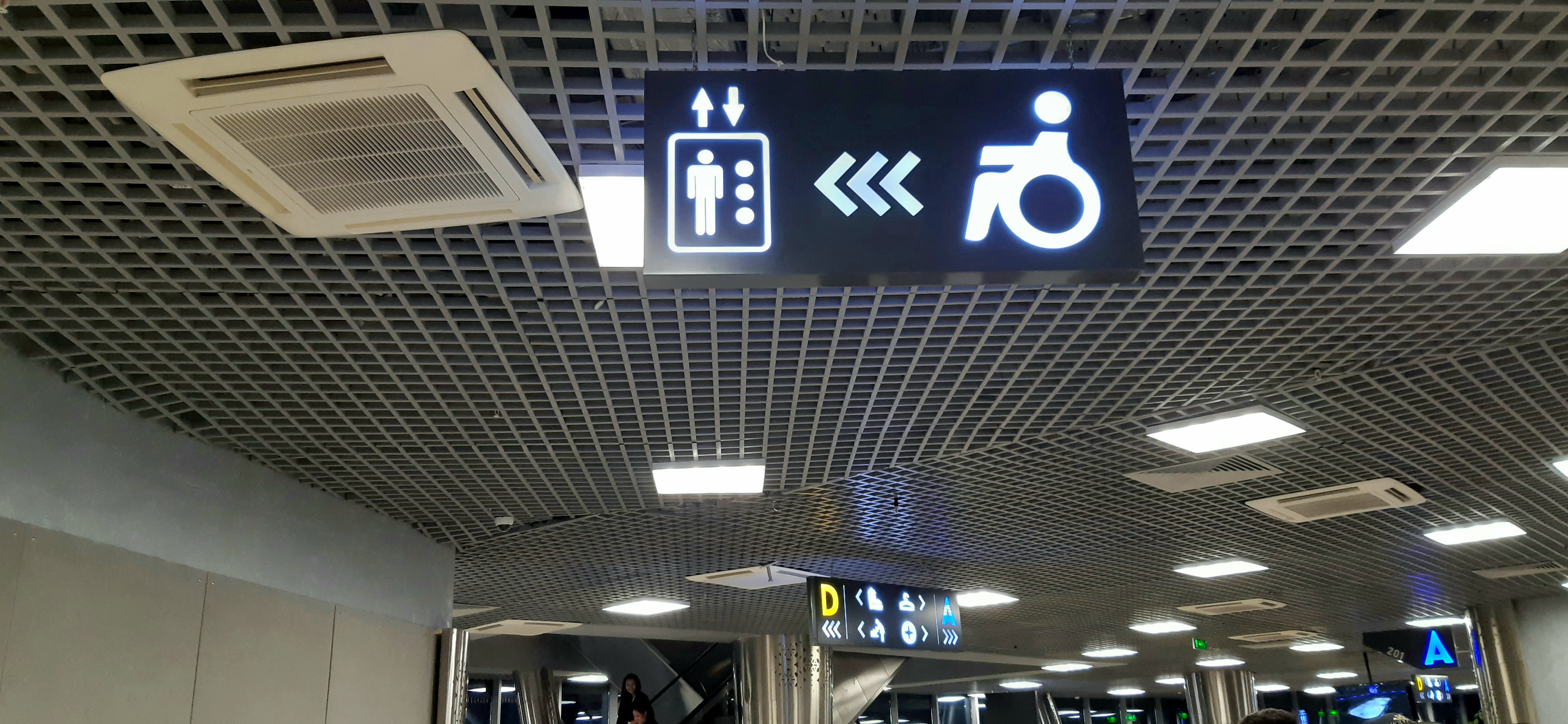

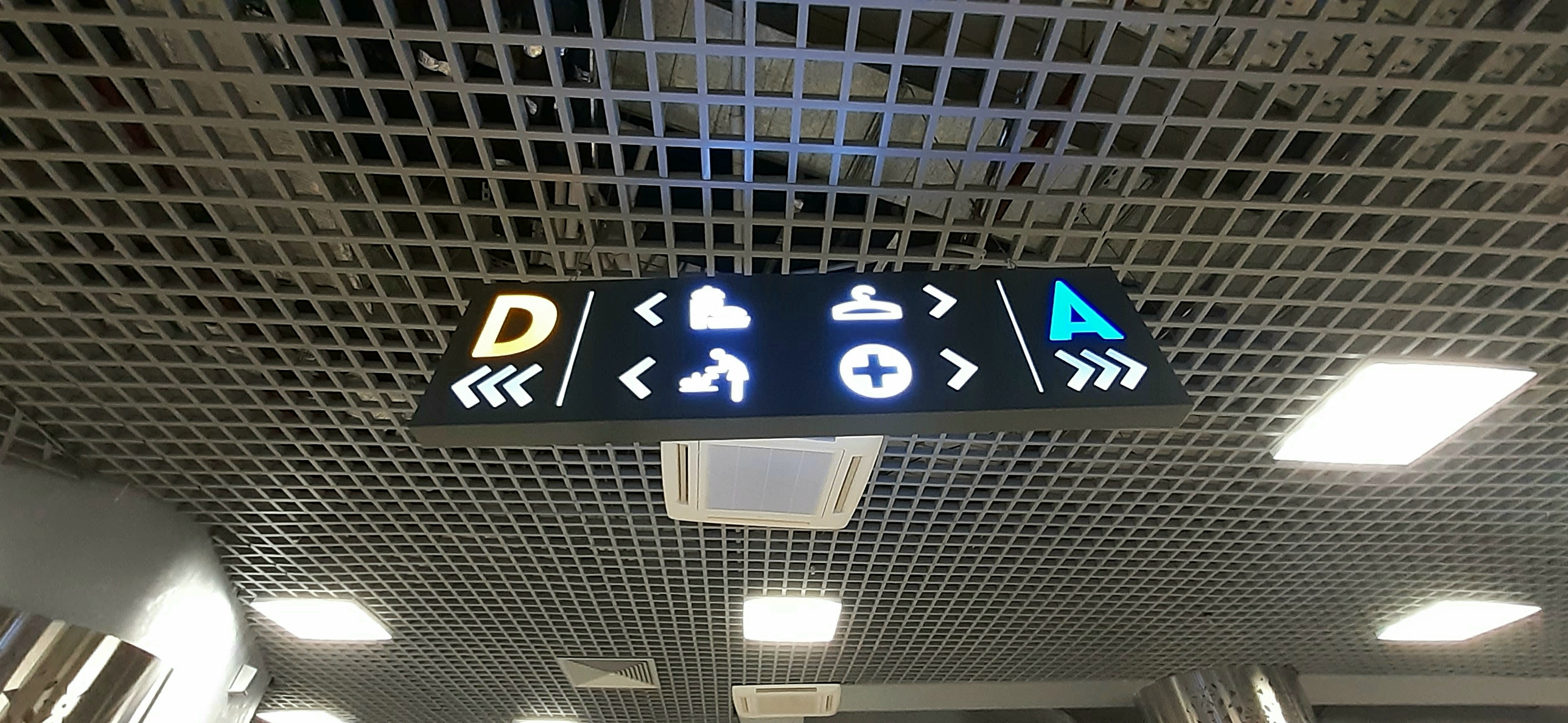

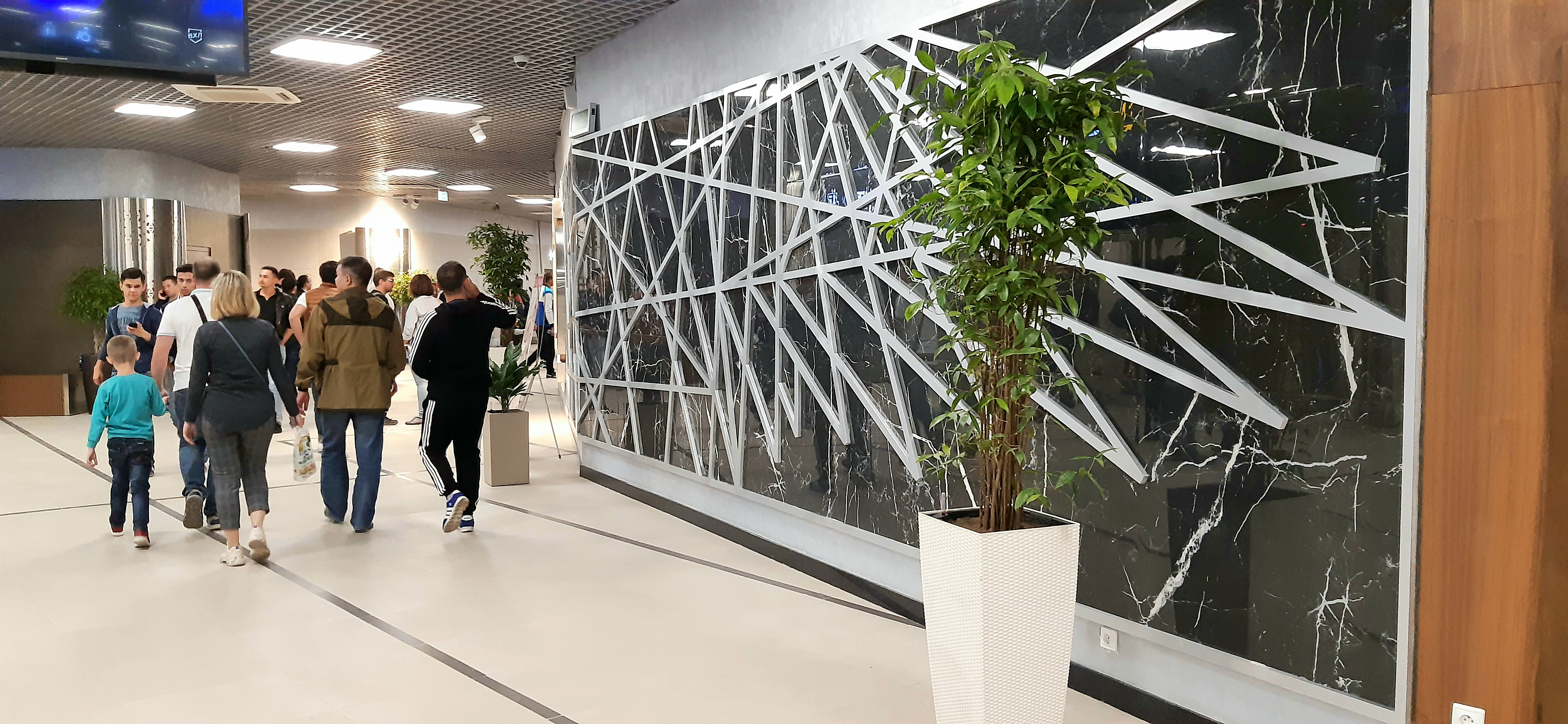

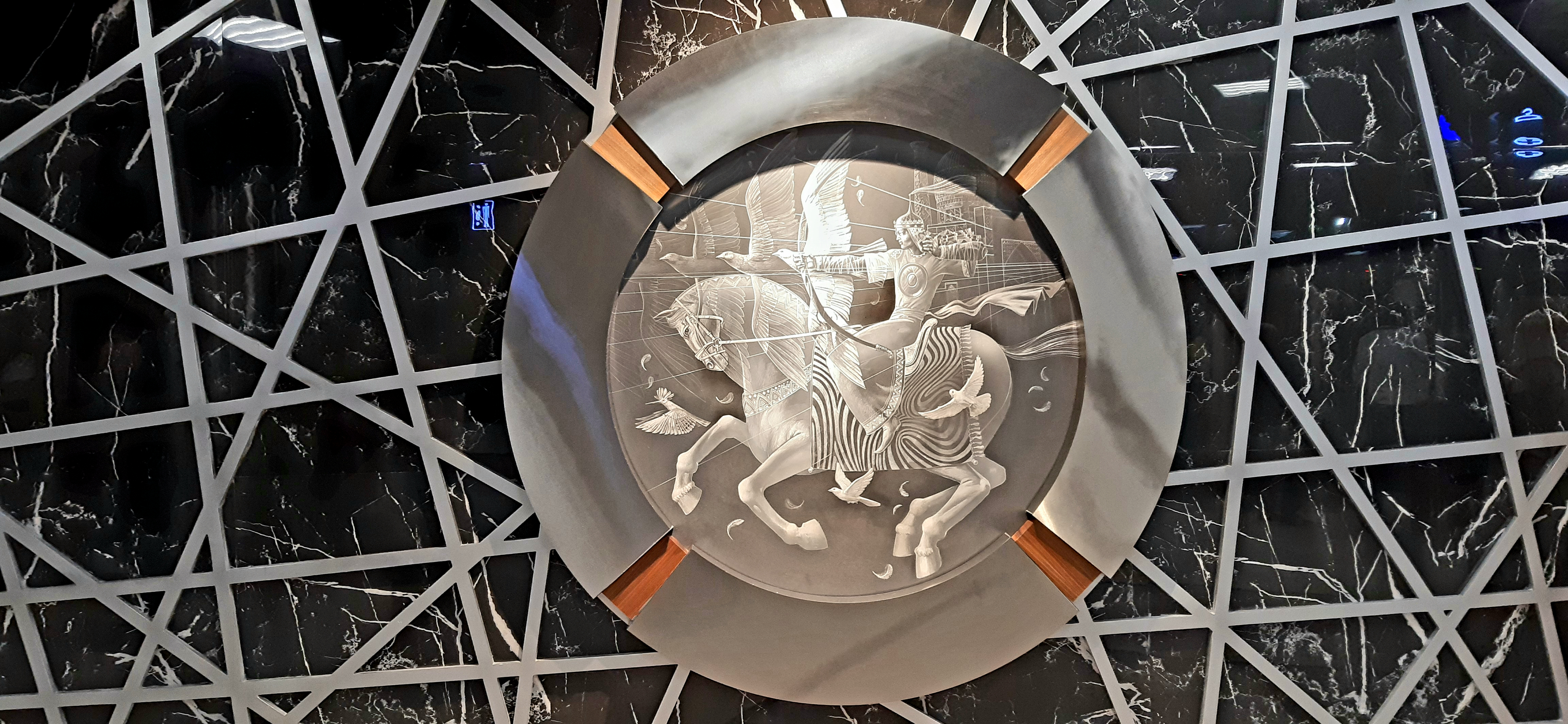

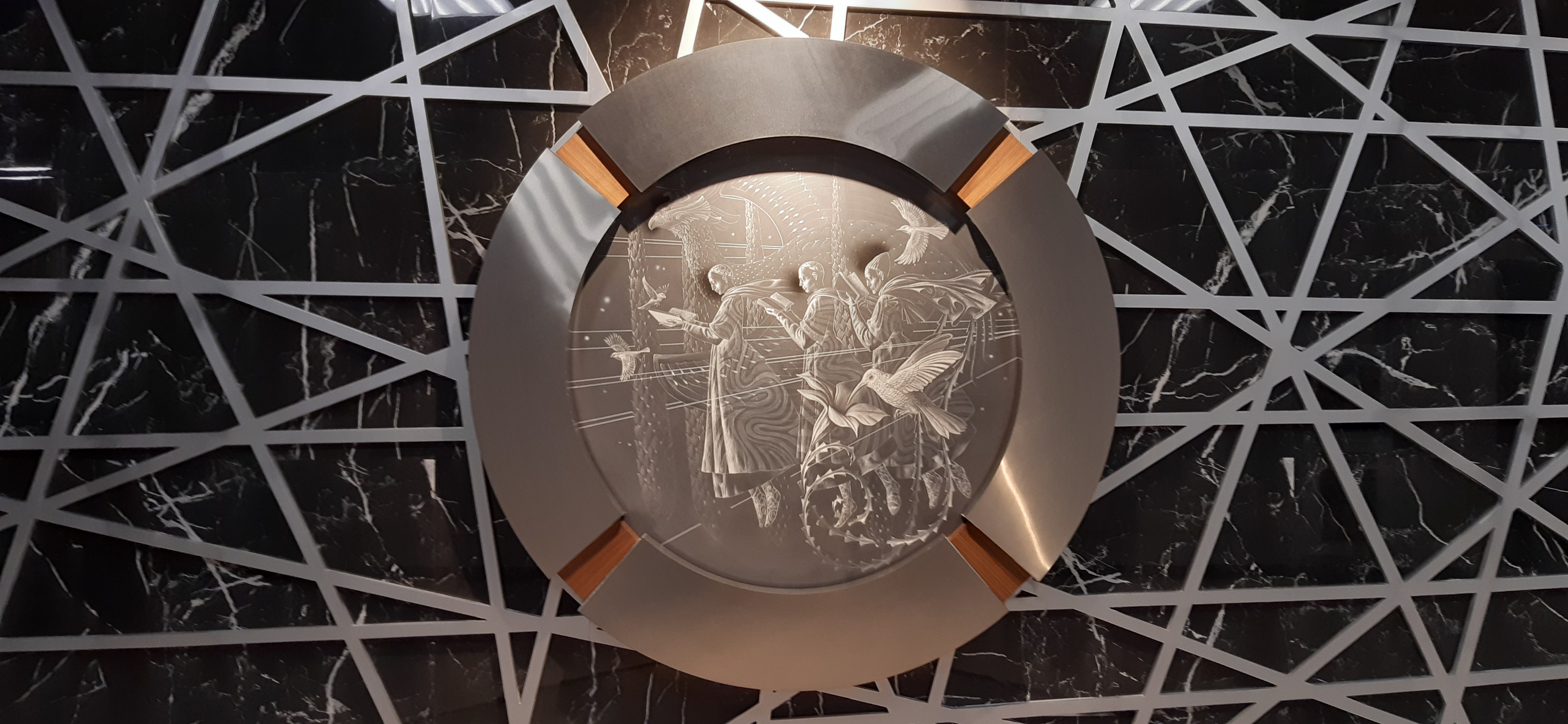

== Future uses ==
In March 2019, after the opening of Humo Arena, Binokor Tashkent would host home games of Uzbekistan Hockey League.

Kontinental Hockey League was interested in having several games held there in 2019/20 season for attracting viewers and potential expansion in Uzbekistan. Binokor Tashkent reportedly had a pathway of entering KHL via competing in second tier league VHL by 2020 at the earliest. It is planned that after the opening of the Humo Arena, it will host home matches for Binokor in the VHL and KHL. On 31 May 2019 it was announced that Humo Tashkent would be joining the VHL for the 2019-20 season and not Binokor Tashkent as originally assumed. Humo will play their home games out of the Humo Ice Dome.

The venue hosted 27 matches of the 2024 FIFA Futsal World Cup, including the opening and final matches.

== See also ==
- Binokor Tashkent
- List of European ice hockey arenas

Preceded by Žalgiris Arena (Lithuania) Kaunas	FIFA Futsal World Cup; Final Venue; 2024	Succeeded by TBD; TBD
