= Victor Nechayev =

Russian ice hockey player (born 1955)

- Born: January 28, 1955 (age 71) Kuybyshevka-Vostochnaya, Amur Oblast, Russian SFSR, Soviet Union
- Height: 6 ft 1 in (185 cm)
- Weight: 183 lb (83 kg; 13 st 1 lb)
- Position: Forward
- Shot: Left
- Played for: Los Angeles Kings
- NHL draft: 132nd overall, 1982; Los Angeles Kings
- Playing career: 1972–1984

Victor Nechayev (born January 28, 1955) is a Russian former professional ice hockey player who played three games for the Los Angeles Kings in the National Hockey League. He was the first player from the Soviet Union to play in the NHL, as well as the first to score a goal.

A native of Siberia, Nechayev met Cheryl Haigler, an American citizen, in Switzerland in 1976, while he was playing for the Red Army team. They married in 1980 in Leningrad. In April 1982, Nechayev was granted permission to join his wife in the United States.

In the 1982 NHL entry draft, Nechayev was picked 132nd overall by the Kings. Unlike other Soviet players, Nechayev was able to join the team immediately, since he was already living in North America at the time he was drafted. He scored his only NHL goal against the New York Rangers on October 17, 1982.

== Career statistics ==
=== Regular season and playoffs ===
			Regular season					Playoffs
Season	Team	League	GP	G	A	Pts	PIM	GP	G	A	Pts	PIM
1972–73	Sibir Novosibirsk	USSR-2	34	10	4	14	16	—	—	—	—	—
1973–74	Sibir Novosibirsk	USSR-2	13	1	1	2	0	—	—	—	—	—
1974–75	Sibir Novosibirsk	USSR-2	47	6	4	10	35	—	—	—	—	—
1975–76	SKA Leningrad	USSR	12	2	0	2	6	—	—	—	—	—
1976–77	Sudostroitel Leningrad	USSR-3	28	11	2	13	8	—	—	—	—	—
1977–78	SKA Leningrad	USSR	22	5	1	6	10	—	—	—	—	—
1978–79	SKA Leningrad	USSR	24	4	4	8	12	—	—	—	—	—
1979–80	Severstal Cherepovets	USSR-3	—	3	—	—	—	—	—	—	—	—
1979–80	Binokor Tashkent	USSR-2	6	1	1	2	2	—	—	—	—	—
1980–81	Izhorets Leningrad	USSR-3	16	5	0	5	12	—	—	—	—	—
1982–83	Los Angeles Kings	NHL	3	1	0	1	0	—	—	—	—	—
1982–83	New Haven Nighthawks	AHL	28	4	7	11	6	—	—	—	—	—
1982–83	Saginaw Gears	IHL	10	1	4	5	0	—	—	—	—	—
1983–84	Düsseldorfer EG	GER	38	7	9	16	30	—	—	—	—	—
USSR totals			58	11	5	16	28	—	—	—	—	—
NHL totals			3	1	0	1	0	—	—	—	—	—
