= Trolleybuses in Tashkent =

Former transit system in Uzbekistan

Tashkent trolleybus system
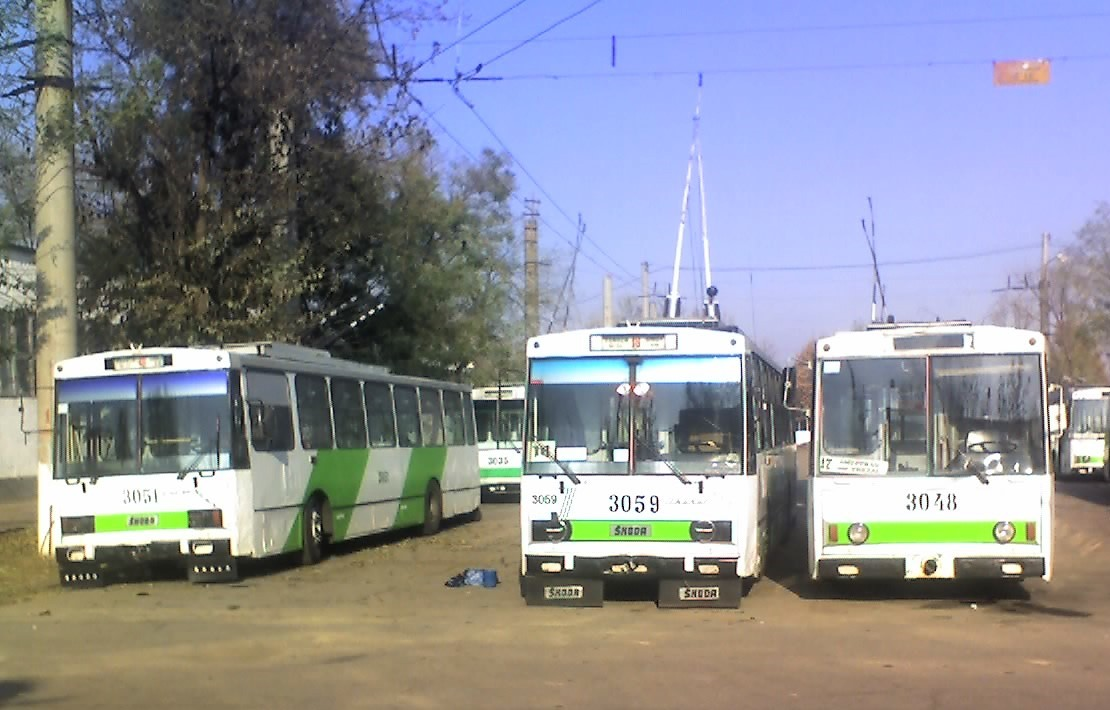

Operation
- Locale: Tashkent, Uzbekistan
- Open: 1947
- Close: 2010
- Status: Closed
- Operator: Toshshahartransxizmat

Infrastructure
- Depot: none

Statistics
- Route length: 87.8 km

The Tashkent trolleybus system is a closed trolleybus system in Tashkent. Having existed for nearly 63 years, what was once Central Asia's largest trolleybus system was shut down on May 1, 2010.

== History ==
The trolleybus appeared on the streets of Tashkent on November 5, 1947. The interval of movement on the first route was 15 minutes. The production consisted of 6 MTB-82D vehicles. The depot was located on the territory of the former Cossack stables (Taras Shevchenko St., 28). Nikolai Sergeevich Svechnikov became the first director of the trolleybus fleet. The first route went from the railway station to pl. Kalinina (Eski Juva), connecting the old and new city. In 1948, a second route was opened from pl. Beshagach to pl. Kalinina (Eski Juva). In 1949, a third route was opened from the railway station to pl. Beshagach. The fourth route (1950) was launched from pl. Kalinin (Eski Juva) to st. Uritsky. The fifth route (1950) ran from the railway station to st. Uritsky. The sixth route (1951) was launched from the Textile Mill (section 56) to the Chukursay makhalla. At the end of the 1950s, the construction of the trolleybus depot No. 2 was started, which opened in 1962 on the street. Pioneer (Arnasai). In 1960, the average speed of the trolleybus was 16.5 km / h, in contrast to the tram, which had an average speed of 12.5 km / h.

== Gallery ==
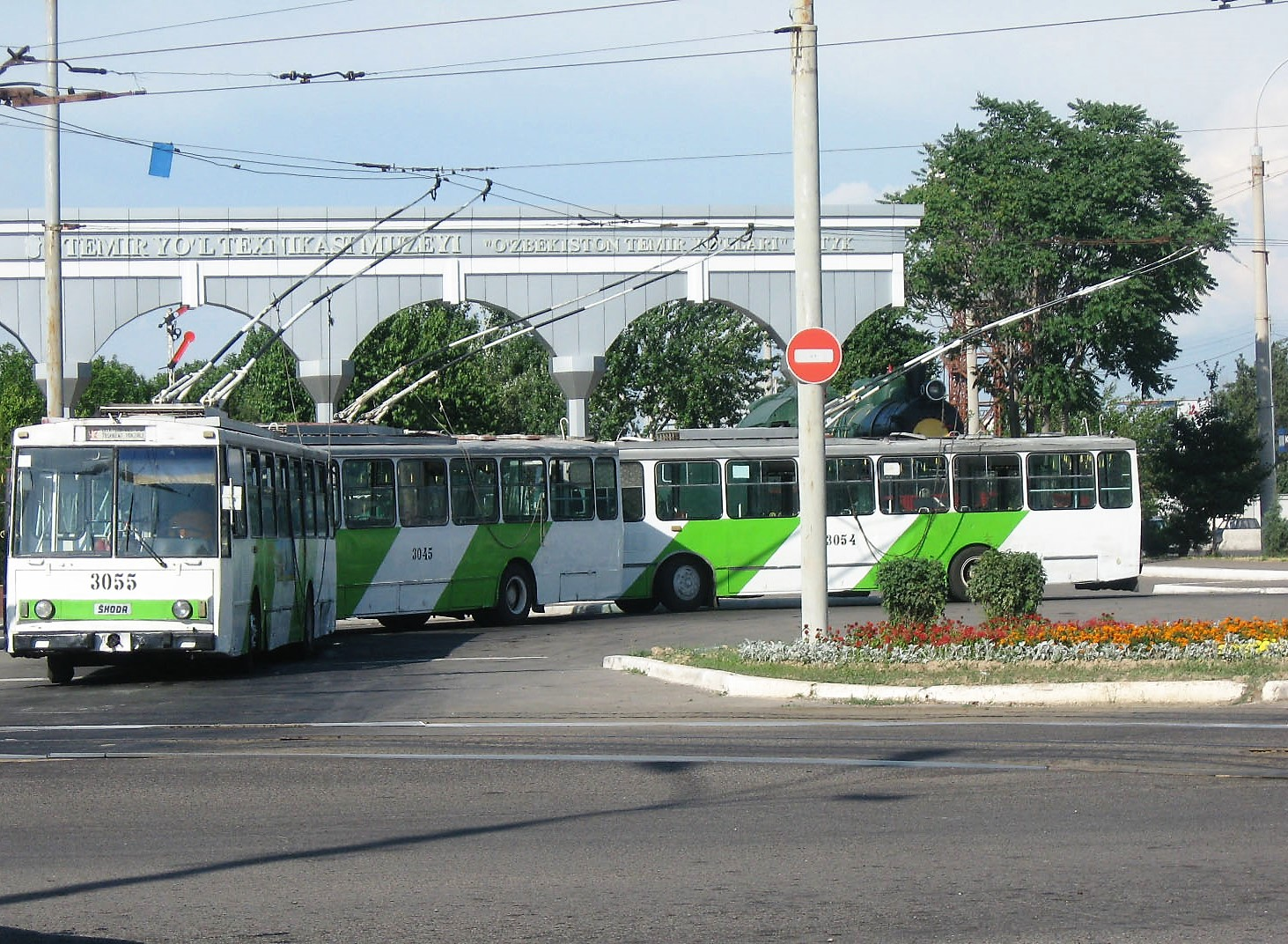
Škoda 14Tr trolleybuses on route No. 17 (Northern Station U-turn)

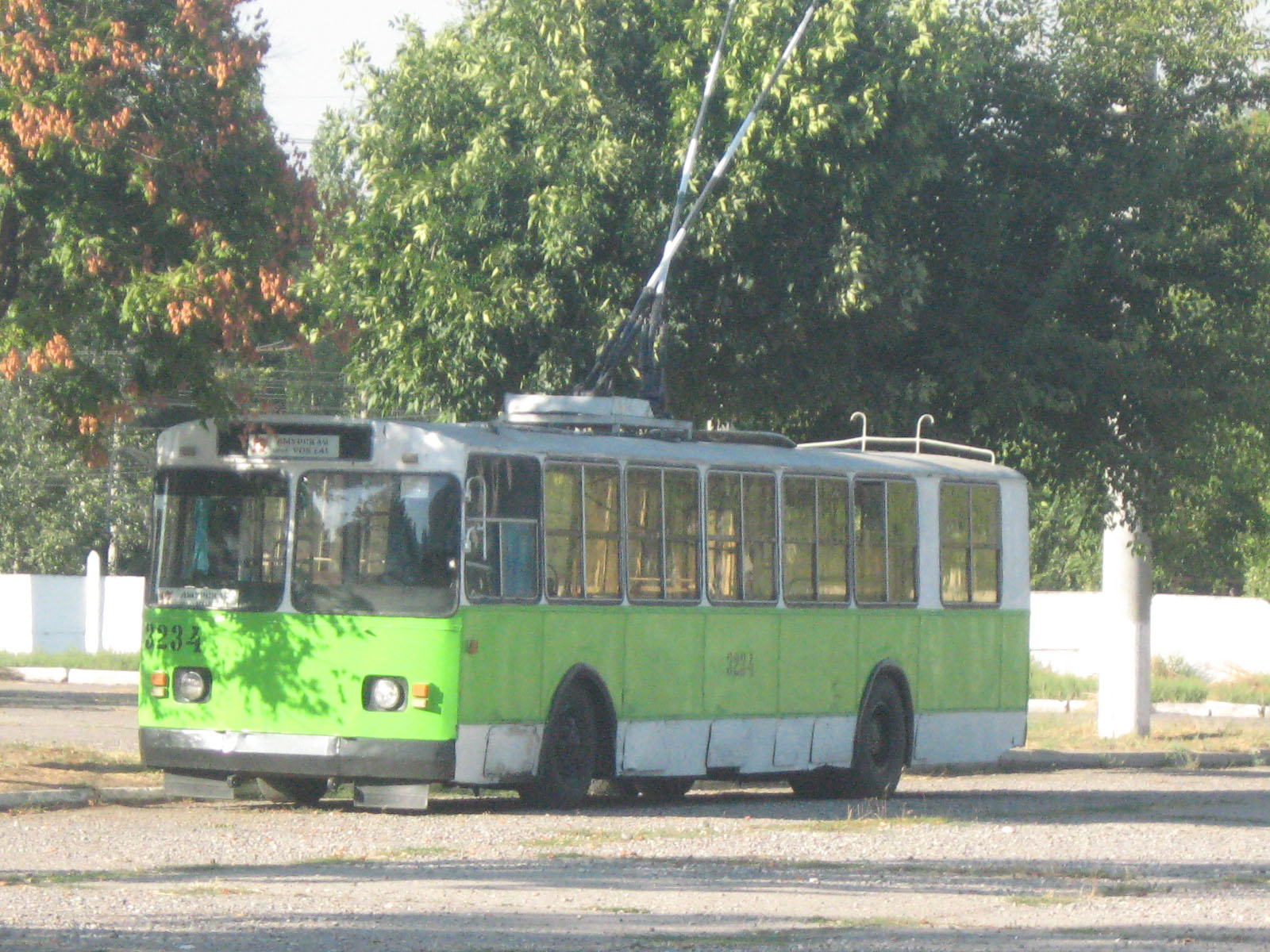
ZiU-9 Route 17 on the territory of tram and trolleybus depot No. 3

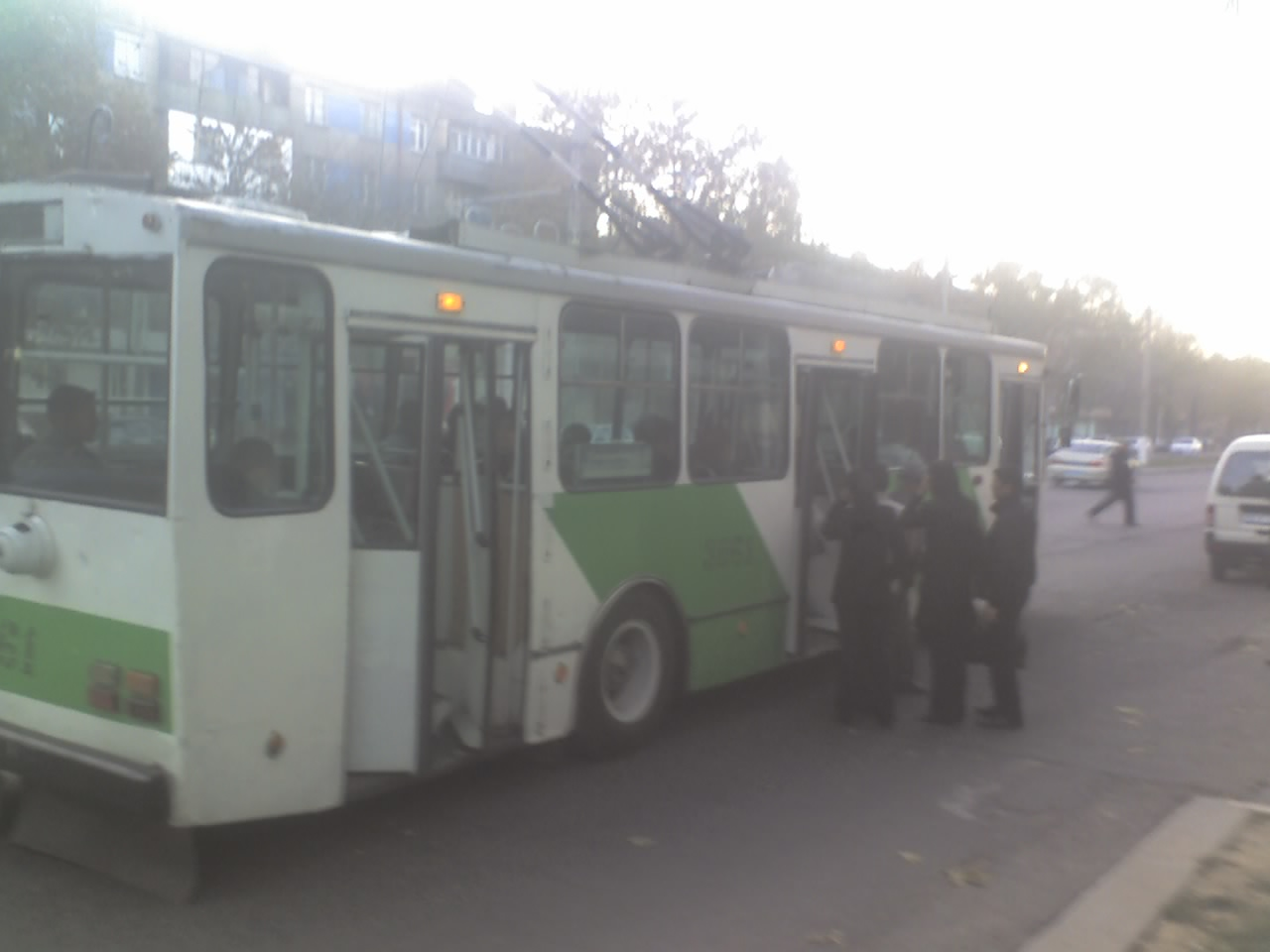
Škoda 14Tr on route 6 (stop "m-in Chilanzar-1")
