= Belgian State Railways Type 23 =

Belgian State Railways Type 23 (NMBS/SNCB Type 53)
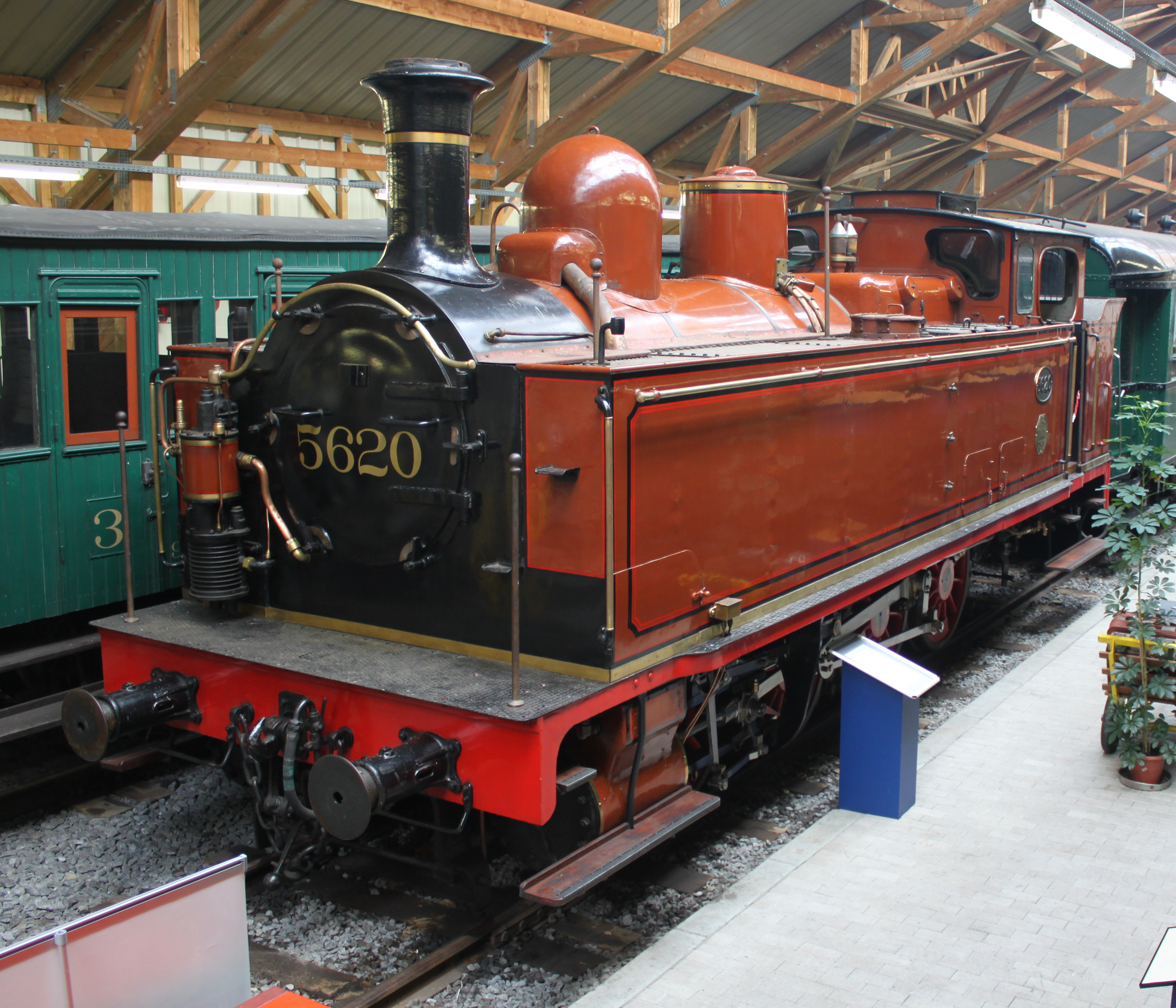
- Type 23/53, as seen at Treignes railway museum (CFV3V)
Type and origin
- Power type: Steam
- Builder: Various
- Build date: 1904–1927
- Total produced: 436 + a few examples for private operators
Specifications
- Configuration
  - Whyte: 0-8-0T
  - UIC: Dt
- Gauge: 1,435 mm (4 ft 8 1/2 in)
- Driver dia.: 1,262 mm (49.69 in)
- Wheelbase: 4,300 mm (169.29 in)
- Loco weight: 53 tonnes (52 long tons; 58 short tons)
- Firebox
  - Grate area: 2.24 m^{2} (24.1 sq ft)
- Boiler pressure: 12.5 atm (1.27 MPa; 184 psi)
- Heating surface: 125.4 m^{2} (1,350 sq ft)
- Cylinders: Two
- Cylinder size: 480 mm × 600 mm (18.90 in × 23.62 in)
Career
- Operators: Belgian State Railways; NMBS/SNCB
- Class: Type 23 (NMBS/SNCB Type 53)
- Numbers: Various; 5300–5675; 53.001–53.375
- Withdrawn: By 1966
- Preserved: One: 53.320 (as 5620)
- Disposition: One preserved, Chassis of one is in Poland, remainder scrapped

The Belgian State Railways Type 23, later known as the NMBS/SNCB Type 53, was a class of 0-8-0T steam locomotives built between 1904 and 1927.

The 436 members of the class were used as shunters at most of the railway stations operated by the Belgian State Railways and its successor, the National Railway Company of Belgium (NMBS/SNCB), which was established in 1926.

One member of the class, no. 53.320, has been preserved by the NMBS/SNCB, and will be part of the collection of Train World, the Belgian national railway museum. It is now painted in a chocolate livery, and bears its earlier NMBS/SNCB number, 5620.

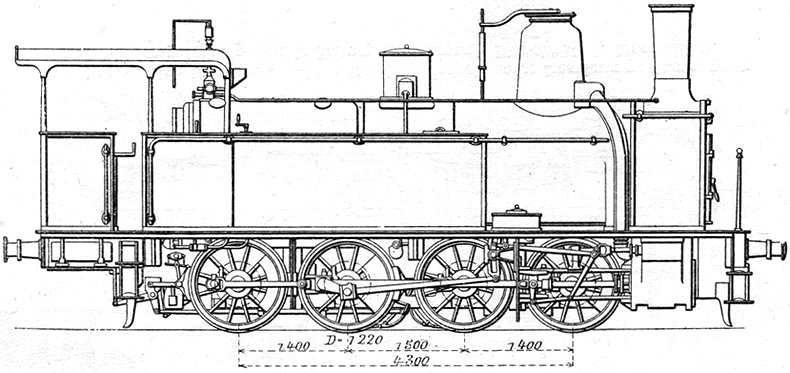
The Type 23 was derived from this Grand Central Belge design.

== See also ==
- History of rail transport in Belgium
- List of SNCB/NMBS classes
- Rail transport in Belgium
