= Football in Uzbekistan =

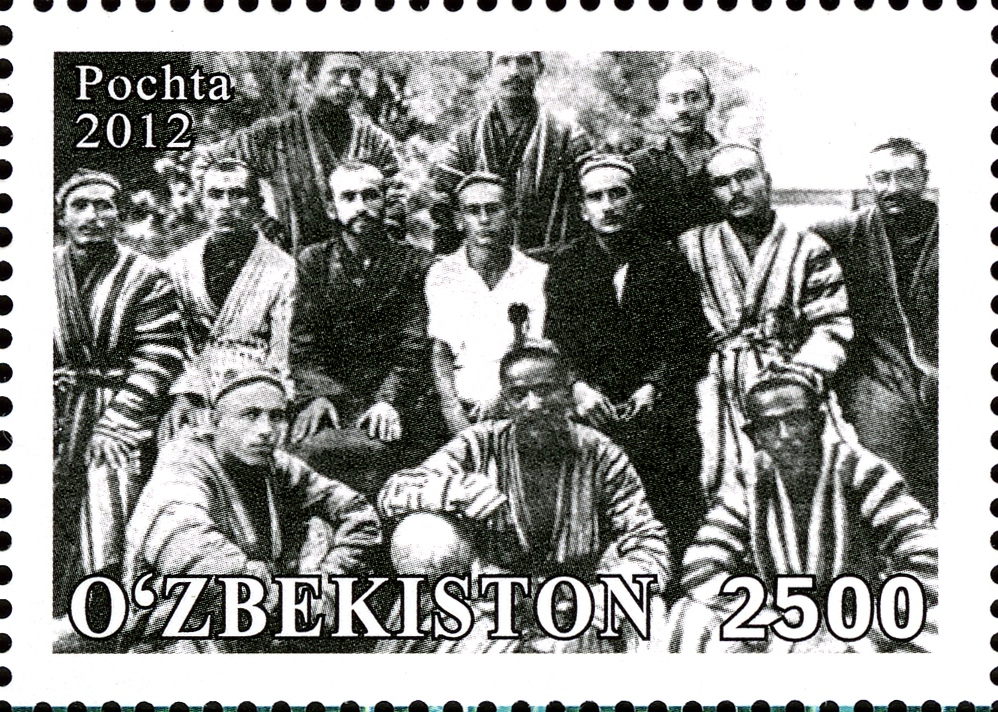
- 100 Years of Uzbek Football on postage stamp of Uzbekistan
- Country: Uzbekistan
- Governing body: Uzbekistan Football Federation
- National team: men's national team

National competitions
- Uzbek League

International competitions
- AFC Cup; AFC Champions League; FIFA World Cup; AFC Asian Cup; FIFA Club World Cup

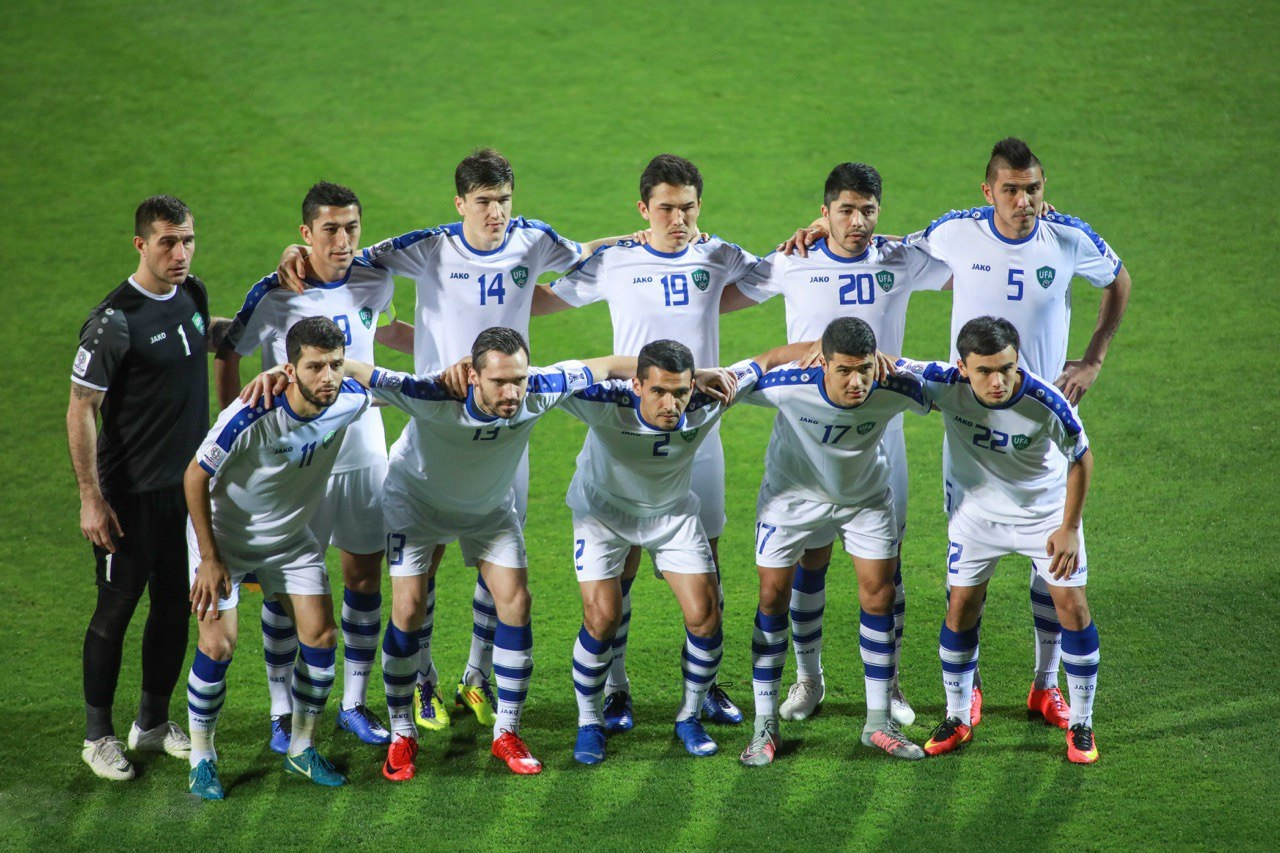
The national football team of Uzbekistan at the 2019 AFC Asian Cup

Football is the most popular sport in Uzbekistan, a country that gained independence in 1991. Approximately 30% of the people in Uzbekistan are interested in football

The national association takes part in all competitions organised by FIFA and the Asian Football Confederation.

== History of football in Uzbekistan ==
=== Soviet Period ===
Football in Uzbekistan started to develop in the 1920s. In 1926, the first championship of the Uzbek SSR (i.e. Uzbek League) was held. Sbornaya Tashkenta and Sokol Tashkent were the most successful clubs in the competition. However the most successful club was FC Pakhtakor, the only football club from Uzbek SSR that played in the USSR Top League with 22 seasons. The Uzbekistan Football Federation was founded in 1946.

Berador Abduraimov is the most famous Uzbekistani footballer during the Soviet period. He played 358 matches for FC Pakhtakor, was top goalscorer of the Soviet Top League in 1968, and represented the Soviet Union at youth level.

Between 1961 and 1992, several Uzbekistani footballers had been members of the USSR national football team:

Name	Position	Team	Caps(Goals)	Years
Gennadi Krasnitsky	Striker	(Soviet Union) USSR	3(1)	1961
Berador Abduraimov	Striker	(Soviet Union) USSR	?(?)	1967
Yuri Pshenichnikov	Goalkeeper	(Soviet Union) USSR	21(0)	1966-1970
Vladimir Fyodorov	Striker	(Soviet Union) USSR	18(0)	1974-1978
Vassilis Hatzipanagis	Midfield	(Soviet Union) USSR	4(1)	1975
Mikhail An	Midfield	(Soviet Union) USSR	2(0)	1978
Andrei Piatnitski	Midfield	(Soviet Union) USSR (Commonwealth of Independent States) CIS	6(2)	1990-1992

=== Since independence ===
In 1994, Uzbekistan Football Federation was reestablished and became a member of FIFA and Asian Football Confederation. In the same year, the Uzbekistan national football team won the Asian Games, at a time when the country was just finding its feet after gaining independence. But in 2003, the national association enjoyed more success: for the first time, the country's U-20 team qualified for the FIFA World Youth Championship in 2003, which was hosted by the UAE. Uzbekistan U-19 reached the semi-finals of AFC U-19 Championships twice in 2012 and 2014 and once qualified to the final in 2008 but defeated by UAE U-19. After the achievement in 2003, Uzbekistan U-20 has participated in FIFA U-20 World Cup three more times so far. In 2009 mundial the team finished its appearance in group stage. In 2013 World Cup in Turkey, U-20 team made play-off and in Round of 16 won Greece U-20 with 3:1, but lost in quarterfinal to France U-20 0:4. The team made an appearance in 2015 FIFA U-20 World Cup and qualified to quarterfinal, and defeated by Senegal U-20 with 0–1.

Uzbekistan U-16 won AFC U-16 Championship in 2012 and it was the second final which the team qualified. In 2010 AFC U-16 Championship U-16 lost to North Korea U-16 in the final match. Uzbekistan U-16 has qualified to FIFA U-17 World Cup twice in 2011 and 2013. In the debut year in the tournament the team finished its appearance in quarterfinal, defeated by Uruguay U-17. Uzbekistan U-16 was stopped by Honduras U-17 in round of 16 in 2013 FIFA U-17 World Cup.

In 2018 Uzbekistan U-23 became the champions in AFC U-23 Championship hosted by China. The team defeated Vietnam U-23 in the final match with 2–1.

In 2025, Uzbekistan national team qualified for the 2026 FIFA World Cup, their first time ever appearance at the tournament. At the AFC Asian Cup, the team's best achievement was a fourth-place finish in 2011.

The most successful football clubs in Uzbekistan are FC Bunyodkor, FC Pakhtakor and FC Nasaf.

In 2007 Pakhtakor won 2007 CIS Cup by defeating FK Ventspils, from Latvia, with 9-8 on penalties. The next season of CIS Cup Pakhtakor reached the final of the competition for the back-to-back second time but lost to Khazar Lenkoran. The team is also perennial competitor in the AFC Champions League, having reached the semi-finals of the competition twice in 2003 and 2004. Pakhtakor currently holds record in number of consecutive participation in AFC Champions League, participating from 2002 to 2013

FC Nasaf won AFC Cup in 2011, defeating Kuwait SC with 2–1 in the final of the tournament and became Uzbekistan's first club to win AFC Cup.

FC Bunyodkor's best achievement is the semi-finals of AFC Champions League: 2008, a debut year of the team in the competition, and the second time in 2012.

Ravshan Irmatov was named The Best Referee in Asia in four consecutive years (2008, 2009, 2010, 2011 and 2014). He was Best Referee of The Year in the 2015 Globe Soccer Awards.

Notable Uzbekistani footballers since independence from the Soviet Union include Server Djeparov (2008 Asian Footballer of the year), Igor Shkvyrin (top goal scorer of the 1994 Asian Games), Mirjalol Qosimov and Maksim Shatskikh.

In 2014, Uzbekistan was one of the eight nations to take part in the first Unity World Cup.

In 2023, the Surkhon club sponsored by Bakhtiyor Fazilov did well in the matches of the Uzbekistan Superleague and the Uzbekistan Cup.

== Most successful clubs overall ==
As of 15 March 2026

local and lower league organizations are not included.

Club	Domestic Titles						Worldwide Titles	Overall titles
Club	Uzbekistan Super League	Uzbekistan Cup	Uzbekistan Super Cup	Uzbekistan League Cup	CIS Cup	Total	AFC Champions League Two	Overall titles
Pakhtakor	**16**	**14**	2	1	**1**	**34**	-	**34**
Nasaf	1	4	**4**	-	-	9	**1**	10
Bunyodkor	5	4	1	-	-	10	-	10
Neftchi Fergana	6	2	1	-	-	9	-	9
Lokomotiv Tashkent	3	3	2	-	-	8	-	8
Navbahor Namangan	1	3	1	-	-	5	-	5
Dustlik	2	1	-	-	-	3	-	3
AGMK	-	1	-	1	-	2	-	2
Sogdiana	-	-	-	**2**	-	2	-	2
MHSK	1	-	-	-	-	1	-	1
Andijon	-	1	-	-	-	1	-	1
Khorazm	-	-	-	1	-	1	-	1
Mash'al	-	-	-	1	-	1	-	1
Shurtan Guzar	-	-	-	1	-	1	-	1

- The articles in italic indicate the defunct leagues and the defunct cups.
- The figures in **bold** indicate the most times this competition has been won by a team.

== Attendances ==
The average attendance per top-flight football league season and the club with the highest average attendance:

Season	League average	Best club	Best club average
2025	4,911	Neftchi	12,262

Source: League page on Wikipedia

== See also ==
- Grigory Fedotov club
- Gennadi Krasnitsky club
- Club 200 of Berador Abduraimov
- List of football stadiums in Uzbekistan
