= Binokor Tashkent =

- City: Tashkent, Uzbekistan
- League: Vtoraya Liga; Pervaya Liga; Uzbekistan Hockey League
- Founded: 1971; 2012 (Revived)
- Home arena: Humo Arena
- Website: xc-binokor.uz

Franchise history
- 1971-1974: Spartak Tashkent
- 1974-1988: Binokor Tashkent
- 2012-present: Binokor Tashkent

HK Binokor Tashkent (Uzbek: Xokkey klubi Binokor Toshkent), (Russian: Хоккейный клуб Бинокор Ташкент) is an ice hockey team based in Tashkent, Uzbekistan. They played in the lower level Soviet leagues (Pervaya Liga and Vtoraya Liga) from 1971 to 1988. The club was re-founded in 2012 and joined the newly created Uzbekistan Hockey League.

== History ==
The club was founded in 1971 as Spartak Tashkent, and made its debut in 1971–72 in Klass A group 2 (currently known as the Vtoraya Liga). The team finished in fourth place in the Eastern Zone in their first season. Tashkent never finished lower than fifth place in their first four seasons. In 1974, the team was renamed Binokor Tashkent. In 1975–76, Binokor Tashkent was promoted to the Pervaya Liga, (then the Klass A Group 1) by virtue of winning the Eastern Zone of the Vtoraya Liga in 1974–75.

The team played eight years in the Pervaya Liga, and had relatively good finishes from 1976 to 1983. They were relegated for the 1984–85 season, following a disastrous 1983–84 season, where they won only five games and finished with 157 goals for, and 348 against.

Tashkent's return to the Vtoraya Liga however only lasted one season, as the team finished first in the Eastern Zone with a 40-10-4 record and promoted back to the Pervaya Liga. They had a terrible record in the Pervaya Liga in 1986–87, finishing 3-33, and were thus relegated again. The team folded after finishing 12-18-6 in the Vtoraya Liga in 1987–88.

Binokor was revived in 2012 to play in the Uzbekistan Hockey League. In October 2013, they took part in the Shymkent Tournament along with teams from Kazakhstan and Kyrgyzstan.

== KHL ambition ==
It was reported that Binokor Tashkent can appear in the Kontinental Hockey League in either 2018/19 or 2019/20. It is planned that after the opening of the Humo Arena, it will host home matches for Binokor in the KHL. The terms of the club's admission into the league directly depend on the date of putting the arena into operation.

In March 2019, during the opening of Humo Arena, Binokor reportedly had a pathway of entering KHL via competing in second-tier league VHL by 2020 at the earliest. The possible time for getting into KHL will be 2022 with training adequate players and sufficient preparations. On 31 May 2019 it was announced that Humo would be joining the VHL for the 2019–20 season and not Binokor Tashkent as originally assumed.

== Season-by-season record ==
Season	League	GP	W	L	T	Pts	GF	GA	Diff.	Place
1971/72	Klass A Group 2	52				67	219	163	+56	4th place in Vostok Zona
1972/73	Klass A Group 2	48	24	15	9	57	175	140	+35	5th place in Vostok Zona
1973/74	Klass A Group 2	48	27	18	3	57	202	164	+38	4th place in Vostok Zona
1974/75	Klass A Group 2	44	23	13	8	54	170	130	+40	4th place in Vostok Zona
1975/76	Klass A Group 2	52	37	10	5	79	248	126	+122	'1st place in Vostok Zona ↑
1976/77	Klass A Group 1	52	17	27	8	42	159	216	-57	10th Place
1977/78	Klass A Group 1	52	30	16	6	66	235	185	+50	4th Place
1978/79	Klass A Group 1	60	31	19	10	72	262	227	+35	5th Place
1979/80	Klass A Group 1	60	25	30	5	55	228	233	-5	10th Place
1980/81	Pervaya Liga	60	32	22	6	70	286	221	+65	7th Place
1981/82	Pervaya Liga	60	28	19	13	69	244	196	+48	7th Place
1982/83	Pervaya Liga	60	24	27	9	57	324	247	+77	9th Place
1983/84	Pervaya Liga	60	5	51	4	14	157	348	-191	16th place↓
1984/85	Vtoraya Liga	54	40	10	4	84	284	183	+101	1st place in Vostok Zona ↑
1985/86	Pervaya Liga	64	22	36	6	50	204	262	-58	5th place in Vostok Zona
1986/87	Pervaya Liga (Q)	36	10	23	3	23	125	170	-45	8th place in Vostok Zona (Qualification round)
1986/87	Pervaya Liga (R)	36	3	33	0	6	98	202	-104	10th place in Vostok Zona (Relegation round) ↓
1987/88	Vtoraya Liga	36	12	18	6	30	122	154	-32	18th place
1987/88	Vtoraya Liga	36	12	18	6	30	122	154	-32	18th place
2013	Uzbekistan Hockey League	2	1	1	0	3	10	9	+1	2nd place

== Notable players ==
- Victor Nechayev
