= New Tashkent =

New district in Tashkent

New Tashkent Uzbek: Yangi Toşkent
- District of Tashkent
- Country: Uzbekistan
- Municipality: Tashkent
- Established: 2023
- Website: https://newtashkent.uz/

New Tashkent (Uzbek: Yangi Toşkent) is an urban development project to build a new district covering 25,000 ha (62,000 acres) in Tashkent, Uzbekistan. The district, located between the Chirchiq and Karasu rivers, is designed to house around 2.5 million people. The project was established by a presidential decree of Shavkat Mirziyoyev in 2023.

The plan of New Tashkent was primarily designed by Cross Works Ltd — led by architect and urban planner Hakan Ceyhan Agca — in cooperation with the Government of Uzbekistan under the auspices of the Directorate for the Construction of the City of New Tashkent under the Cabinet of Ministers of Uzbekistan. The Head of the Directorate and Deputy Minister of Construction is Davronjon Adilov.

== Construction ==
The project plans to complete the first phase of development, covering approximately 6,000 hectares, by 2045. The Advisor to the Director on Urban Planning Projects of the Directorate of New Tashkent, Saidazim Sharipov, said on an interview, that "the territory of New Tashkent adjoins the eastern part of the existing Tashkent. Tashkent's eastern border is defined by highway 4R12. This is where the western part of New Tashkent begins. The northern border will end at the lower limits of the city of Yangibazar. The eastern border runs along the Karasu River. In the south, the city will end roughly where Tashkent ends".

Gazeta.uz, a local news-outlet, reported that a quarter in New Tashkent will be inspired by the Russian city of Saint-Petersburg and that construction of it will begin in mid 2026. It was also claimed by the management of the project that about 30% of the territory of New Tashkent will consist of parks and squares.

== Pricing and estate ==
The information on how much estate will be constructed in New Tashkent, has not yet been published, as of February 2026. The Uzbekistani government claimed that on average, for 95 hectares, there will be about 15 thousands of flats. About 1.8 million square meters of New Tashkent has been completed by late 2025. New Tashkent is planned to function a "green city" with one of the goals being to enhance nature and ecology of the city. A 420 hectares large park named the Central Park will be built in New Tashkent, where about 200 thousands of trees will grow.
