= 2020 Uzbekistan Cup final =

- Event: 2020 Uzbekistan Cup
AGMK	Pakhtakor
0	3
- Report
- Date: 20 December 2020; 5 years ago
- Venue: Markaziy, Namangan
- Man of the Match: Dragan Ćeran
- Referee: Zakir Kadyrov (Uzbekistan)
- Attendance: 3579
- Weather: Cloudy

2020 Uzbekistan Cup final (in Uzbek: Футбол бўйича 2020-йилги Ўзбекистон Кубоги финали) was the 28th final match of Uzbekistan Cup.

VAR system was used in the final. The match was played on December 20 between AGMK of Tashkent Region and Pakhtakor club of Tashkent city. Pakhtakor football club became the owner of the Uzbekistan Cup for the 13th time in its history.

== Squads ==
„AGMK“: 35.Valijon Rahimov, 2.Akmal Shorakhmedov, 3.Sardor Rakhmanov, 5.Dilshod Juraev (4.Mirjamol Qosimov, 74), 7.Elgujja Grigalashvili (77.Arslanmyrat Amanow, 62), 11.Murodjon Toshmatov (31.Saydullo Rakhmatov, 46), 18.Bakhrom Abdurakhimov (30.Jasurbek Umarov, 74), 21.Mate Vatsadze (9.Zafar Polvonov, 62), 23.Jovan Đokić, 44.Boburbek Yoʻldashov, 94.Husniddin Gafurov.

32.Suhrob Sultonov, 10.Shahzodbek Nurmatov, 20.Mirgʻiyos Sulaymonov, 88.Igor Zonjić.

„Pakhtakor“: 35.Sanjar Kuvvatov, 3.Khojiakbar Alijonov, 4.Akramjon Komilov (29.Vladimir Kozak, 89), 5.Anzur Ismailov, 9.Jaloliddin Masharipov, 10.Dragan Ćeran (99.Javokhir Sidikov, 83), 15.Egor Krimets, 17.Dostonbek Khamdamov (18.Khojimat Erkinov, 72), 20.Odiljon Hamrobekov, 21.Abror Ismoilov (27.Sardor Sabirkhodjaev, 72), 77.Eren Derdiyok

25.Eldorbek Suyunov, 7.Sadriddin Abdullaev, 8.Asadbek Sobirjonov, 23.Sherzod Azamov, 28.Diyor Kholmatov.

== Details ==
December 20, 2020 Final	AGMK	0–3	Paxtakor	Namangan
15:00 (UTC+5)		Hisobot	Dragan Ćeran 28'; Dragan Ćeran 46'; Jaloliddin Masharipov 59'	Stadium: Markaziy; Attendance: 3579; Referee: Zakir Kadyrov
