= 2022 Pakhtakor Tashkent FK season =

Pakhtakor Tashkent
2022 season
- President: Bobur Shodiev
- Manager: Slavče Vojneski (until 7 July); Maksim Shatskikh (from 14 July)
- Uzbek League: 1st (champions)
- Uzbekistan Cup: Quarter-finals vs Navbahor Namangan
- Uzbekistan Super Cup: Winners
- AFC Champions League: Group Stage
- Top goalscorer: League: Dragan Ćeran (20); All: Dragan Ćeran (22)
Home colours	Away colours

The 2022 season was Pakhtakor Tashkent's 31st season in the Uzbek League in Uzbekistan.

== Season events ==
Prior to the start of the season, Slavče Vojneski was appointed as the new Head Coach of Pakhtakor following the end of Pieter Huistra's contract.

On 10 February, Pakhtakor announced the signing of Oleksiy Larin to a one-year contract on a free transfer from Istiklol.

On 6 July, Pakhtakor announced that Kamen Hadzhiev had left the club after his contract was terminated by mutual agreement. The following day, 7 July, Slavče Vojneski left his role as Head Coach through mutual agreement, with Maksim Shatskikh being appointed as his replacement on 14 July.

On 26 July, Pakhtakor announced the signing of Przemysław Banaszak from Górnik Łęczna, becoming the clubs first Polish player.

== Squad ==
As of match played 12 November 2022

No.	Name	Nationality	Position	Date of birth (age)	Signed from	Signed in	Contract ends	Apps.	Goals
Goalkeepers
25	Eldorbek Suyunov	(Uzbekistan)	GK	12 April 1991 (aged 31)	Nasaf	2017		103	0
35	Sanjar Kuvvatov	(Uzbekistan)	GK	8 January 1990 (aged 32)	Nasaf	2019		83	0
51	Otabek Boymurodov	(Uzbekistan)	GK	5 June 2003 (aged 19)	Academy	2022		0	0
Defenders
3	Khojiakbar Alijonov	(Uzbekistan)	DF	19 April 1997 (aged 25)	Academy	2017		147	7
4	Dostonbek Tursunov	(Uzbekistan)	DF	13 June 1995 (aged 27)	Chongqing Liangjiang Athletic	2022		8	0
5	Oleksandr Nasonov	(Ukraine)	DF	28 April 1992 (aged 30)	Sokół Kleczew	2022		12	1
13	Ilija Martinović	(Montenegro)	DF	31 January 1994 (aged 28)	Chornomorets Odesa	2022		7	0
19	Bekhzod Nematov	(Uzbekistan)	DF	1 September 2002 (aged 20)	Academy	2022		1	0
23	Sherzod Azamov	(Uzbekistan)	DF	14 January 1990 (aged 32)	Nasaf	2017		139	3
34	Farrukh Sayfiev	(Uzbekistan)	DF	17 January 1991 (aged 31)	Nasaf	2018		167	9
46	Shahriyor Jabborov	(Uzbekistan)	DF	14 January 2003 (aged 19)	Academy	2022		6	0
88	Shahzod Azmiddinov	(Uzbekistan)	DF	7 August 2000 (aged 22)	Academy	2020		32	3
Midfielders
6	Ikromjon Alibaev	(Uzbekistan)	MF	9 January 1994 (aged 28)	Daejeon Hana Citizen	2022		26	0
7	Odiljon Hamrobekov	(Uzbekistan)	MF	13 February 1996 (aged 26)	Shabab Al Ahli	2021		110	2
8	Azizbek Turgunboev	(Uzbekistan)	MF	1 October 1994 (aged 28)	Navbahor Namangan	2021		68	9
16	Ruslan Roziyev	(Uzbekistan)	MF	10 November 2002 (aged 20)	Academy	2020		1	0
17	Dostonbek Khamdamov	(Uzbekistan)	MF	24 July 1996 (aged 26)	Al-Nasr	2021	2022	106	28
27	Sardor Sabirkhodjaev	(Uzbekistan)	MF	6 November 1994 (aged 28)	Bunyodkor	2019		138	11
28	Diyor Kholmatov	(Uzbekistan)	MF	22 July 2002 (aged 20)	Youth Team	2020		3148	2
32	Bekhruz Askarov	(Uzbekistan)	MF	8 March 2003 (aged 19)	Academy	2022		2	0
42	Abbosbek Fayzullaev	(Uzbekistan)	MF	3 October 2003 (aged 19)	Youth Team	2021	2023	35	8
59	Diyorbek Ortiqboyev	(Uzbekistan)	MF	6 January 2003 (aged 19)	Youth Team	2021		1	0
Forwards
10	Dragan Ćeran	(Serbia)	FW	6 October 1987 (aged 35)	Nasaf	2018		158	108
19	Przemysław Banaszak	(Poland)	FW	10 May 1997 (aged 25)	Górnik Łęczna	2022		10	3
36	Abbos Ergashboev	(Uzbekistan)	FW	28 March 2003 (aged 19)	Youth Team	2022		4	1
63	Muhammadali Urinbaev	(Uzbekistan)	FW	24 April 2005 (aged 17)	Youth Team	2021		13	1
66	Rustam Turdimurodov	(Uzbekistan)	FW	4 April 2004 (aged 18)	Youth Team	2022		4	0
Players away on loan
19	Khumoyunmirzo Iminov	(Uzbekistan)	MF	15 January 2000 (aged 22)	Youth Team	2019		26	0
77	Mirjakhon Mirakhmadov	(Uzbekistan)	FW	15 July 1997 (aged 25)	Bunyodkor	2022		11	1
Players who left during the season
5	Oleksiy Larin	(Ukraine)	DF	4 June 1994 (aged 28)	Istiklol	2022	2022	14	0
11	Sardor Rashidov	(Uzbekistan)	FW	14 June 1991 (aged 31)	Qatar	2021		22	3
14	Oliver Sarkic	(Montenegro)	FW	23 July 1997 (aged 25)	Blackpool	2022		14	4
18	Khojimat Erkinov	(Uzbekistan)	MF	29 May 2001 (aged 21)	Youth Team	2019		55	10
21	Kamen Hadzhiev	(Bulgaria)	DF	22 September 1991 (aged 31)	Beroe Stara Zagora	2022		14	0
29	Zhasur Yakubov	(Uzbekistan)	DF	26 March 1999 (aged 23)	Academy	2022		5	0
44	Azizkhon Isokov	(Uzbekistan)	GK	23 December 2000 (aged 21)	Academy	2020		0	0

== Transfers ==
=== In ===
Date	Position	Nationality	Name	From	Fee	Ref.
3 February 2022	FW	(Montenegro)	Oliver Sarkic	Blackpool	Undisclosed	
8 February 2022	DF	(Bulgaria)	Kamen Hadzhiev	Beroe Stara Zagora	Undisclosed	
10 February 2022	DF	(Ukraine)	Oleksiy Larin	Istiklol	Free	
21 July 2022	DF	(Montenegro)	Ilija Martinović	Chornomorets Odesa	Undisclosed	
26 July 2022	FW	(Poland)	Przemysław Banaszak	Górnik Łęczna	Undisclosed	
30 July 2022	DF	(Uzbekistan)	Dostonbek Tursunov	Chongqing Liangjiang Athletic	Undisclosed	
2 August 2022	DF	(Ukraine)	Oleksandr Nasonov	Sokół Kleczew	Undisclosed	

=== Out ===
Date	Position	Nationality	Name	To	Fee	Ref.
24 June 2022	FW	(Uzbekistan)	Sardor Rashidov	Umm Salal	Undisclosed	
8 July 2022	DF	(Uzbekistan)	Khojimat Erkinov	Torpedo Moscow	Undisclosed	
21 July 2022	MF	(Uzbekistan)	Abrorbek Ismoilov	Neftchi Fergana	Undisclosed	
31 July 2022	DF	(Ukraine)	Oleksiy Larin	Neftchi Fergana	Undisclosed	
21 July 2022	DF	(Uzbekistan)	Zhasur Yakubov	Bunyodkor	Undisclosed	
30 July 2022	GK	(Uzbekistan)	Azizkhon Isokov	Surkhon Termez	Undisclosed	

=== Loans out ===
Start date	Position	Nationality	Name	To	End date	Ref.
22 January 2022	MF	(Uzbekistan)	Dostonbek Khamdamov	Al-Sailiya	30 June 2022	
10 February 2022	MF	(Uzbekistan)	Abrorbek Ismoilov	Neftchi Fergana	21 July 2022	
18 July 2022	MF	(Uzbekistan)	Mirzhakhon Mirakhmadov	AGMK	31 December 2023	
30 July 2022	MF	(Uzbekistan)	Khumoyunmirzo Iminov	Buxoro	31 December 2022	

=== Released ===
Date	Position	Nationality	Name	Joined	Date	Ref
6 July 2022	DF	(Bulgaria)	Kamen Hadzhiev	Lokomotiv Sofia	13 July 2022	
30 July 2022	FW	(Montenegro)	Oliver Sarkic	Dečić	11 February 2023	

== Friendlies ==
	–
UZT (UTC+5)

== Competitions ==
=== Overview ===
Competition	First match	Last match	Starting round	Final position	Record							
Competition	First match	Last match	Starting round	Final position	Pld	W	D	L	GF	GA	GD	Win %
Super League	3 March 2022	12 November 2022	Matchday 1	Champions	26	15	9	2	47	18	+29	57.69
Uzbekistan Cup	23 August 2022	2 September 2022	Round of 16	Quarterfinal	2	1	0	1	6	2	+4	50.00
Super Cup	27 February 2022		Final	Winners	1	1	0	0	1	0	+1	100.00
AFC Champions League	7 April 2022	26 April 2022	Group Stage	Group Stage	6	2	0	4	10	15	−5	33.33
Total					35	19	9	7	64	35	+29	54.29

Last updated: 12 November 2022
Source: Competitions

=== Super Cup ===
27 February 2022	Pakhtakor Tashkent	1 – 0	Nasaf	Tashkent
16:00 UZT (UTC+5)	Sayfiev (yellow card) 13'; Turgunboev (yellow card) 49'; Alibaev (yellow card) 53'; Kuvvatov (yellow card) 76'; Ćeran 61' (yellow card) 84'; Hamrobekov (yellow card) 86'	Report	Stanojević (yellow card) 19'; Xolmurodov (yellow card) 90+4'	Stadium: Central Stadium; Attendance: 7,200; Referee: Akobir Shukrullaev

=== Uzbek League ===
==== League table ====
Pos	Team	Pld	W	D	L	GF	GA	GD	Pts	Qualification or relegation
1	Pakhtakor	26	15	9	2	47	18	+29	54	Qualification to the AFC Champions League group stage
2	Navbahor	26	15	8	3	33	15	+18	53	Qualification to the AFC Champions League preliminary round
3	Nasaf (Note: Nasaf qualified to the AFC Champions League as 2022 Uzbekistan Cup champions.)	26	13	10	3	37	16	+21	49	Qualification to the AFC Champions League group stage
4	AGMK	26	13	5	8	44	23	+21	44	Qualification to the AFC Champions League preliminary round
5	Qizilqum	26	12	3	11	34	36	−2	39	

Updated to match(es) played on 12 November 2022. Source: Uzbekistan Professional Football League
Rules for classification: 1) points; 2) head-to-head points; 3) head-to-head goal difference; 4) head-to-head away goals scored; 5) goal difference; 6) number of goals scored.

==== Results summary ====
Overall								Home						Away					
Pld	W	D	L	GF	GA	GD	Pts	W	D	L	GF	GA	GD	W	D	L	GF	GA	GD
26	15	9	2	47	18	+29	54	8	3	2	27	12	+15	7	6	0	20	6	+14

Last updated: 12 November 2022.
Source: See Results

==== Results by round ====
Round	1	2	3	4	5	6	7	8	9	10	11	12	13	14	15	16	17	18	19	20	21	22	23	24	25	26
Ground	A	H	A	H	H	A	H	A	A	A	H	A	H	A	A	H	A	H	A	H	A	H	H	H	H	A
Result	W	W	D	W	D	D	D	D	W	W	L	W	W	D	W	D	D	W	W	L	D	W	W	W	W	W
Position																										

Source: See Results
A = Away; H = Home; W = Win; D = Draw; L = Loss

==== Results ====
3 March 2022 1	Dinamo Samarqand	0 – 2	Pakhtakor Tashkent	Samarkand
18:30 UZT (UTC+5)	Chumak (yellow card) 40'	Report	Ćeran 31'; Erkinov 34'; Yakubov (yellow card) 75'	Stadium: Dinamo Samarkand Stadium; Attendance: 10,895; Referee: Vadim Agishev

10 March 2022 2	Pakhtakor Tashkent	1 – 0	Neftchi Fergana	Tashkent
18:30 UZT (UTC+5)	Ćeran 52'; Hadzhiev (yellow card) 60'; Larin (yellow card) 82'; Sarkic (yellow card) 90'	Report	Ismoilov (red card) 21'; G'ofurov (yellow card) 28'; Ubaydullayev (yellow card) 52'; Kilichev (yellow card) 56'; Gafurov (yellow card) 74'; Turaev (yellow card) 88'	Stadium: Central Stadium; Attendance: 5,130; Referee: Rustam Lutfullin

16 March 2022 3	Olympic Tashkent	1 – 1	Pakhtakor Tashkent	Tashkent
18:30 UZT (UTC+5)	Jiyanov 5'; Tursunov (yellow card) 31'; Muxtorov (yellow card) 44'; Mirsaidov (red card) 58'; Anvarov (yellow card) 71'; Toirov (yellow card) 90+1'	Report	Alibaev (red card) 12'; Hamrobekov (yellow card) 19'; Sayfiev 22'	Stadium: Central Stadium; Attendance: 543; Referee: Elyor Tursunov

1 April 2022 4	Pakhtakor Tashkent	1 – 0	Navbahor Namangan	Tashkent
19:00 UZT (UTC+5)	Ćeran 83'; Sayfiev (yellow card) 88'	Report	Iskanderov (yellow card) 73'; Boltaboev (yellow card) 75'; Khashimov (yellow card) 86'; G‘anixonov (yellow card) 87'	Stadium: Central Stadium; Attendance: 12,767; Referee: Akobir Shukrullayev

2 May 2022 6	Pakhtakor Tashkent	0 – 0	AGMK	Tashkent
18:30 UZT (UTC+5)	Sarkic (yellow card) 4'; Sabirkhodjaev (yellow card) 34'; Azamov (yellow card) 79' (red card) 79'	Report	Abdullayev (yellow card) 23'; Tursunov (yellow card) 60'; Komilov (yellow card) 82'	Stadium: Central Stadium; Attendance: 1,538; Referee: Firdavs Norsafarov

7 May 2022 7	Nasaf	0 – 0	Pakhtakor Tashkent	Qarshi
19:00 UZT (UTC+5)	Saitov (yellow card) 48'	Report	Hadzhiev (yellow card) 17'; Alijonov (yellow card) 85'; Sayfiev (yellow card) 90+3'	Stadium: Markaziy Stadium; Attendance: 15,500; Referee: Akobir Shukrullayev

12 May 2022 8	Pakhtakor Tashkent	2 – 2	Surkhon Termez	Tashkent
19:00 UZT (UTC+5)	Alibaev (yellow card) 32'; Sarkic 54', 66'; Alijonov (yellow card) 74'; Fayzullaev (yellow card) 77'	Report	Akbarov (yellow card) 2'; Hasanov (yellow card) 22'; Qosimov (yellow card) 58'; Quezada 81'; Bobojonov 90+3'	Stadium: Central Stadium; Attendance: 1,122; Referee: Ilgiz Tantashev

18 May 2022 9	Kokand 1912	1 – 1	Pakhtakor Tashkent	Yaypan
16:45 UZT (UTC+5)	Xolmuhammedov (penalty missed) 2'; Rustamov (yellow card) 36'; Rahmatullayev (yellow card) 81'; Abdullayev (yellow card) 82'; Josović 90+9' (pen.)	Report	Hamrobekov (yellow card) 53'; Ćeran (yellow card) 71' (goal) 86'; Suyunov (yellow card) 90+8' (red card) 90+9'	Stadium: Uzbekistan Stadium; Attendance: 5,702; Referee: Rustam Lutfullin

23 May 2022 10	Lokomotiv Tashkent	0 – 2	Pakhtakor Tashkent	Tashkent
19:00 UZT (UTC+5)	Qobilov (yellow card) 29'; Muxtorov (yellow card) 30'; Gulyamov (yellow card) 43'	Report	Ćeran 28'; Sayfiev (yellow card) 41'; Sarkic 48'; Hadzhiev (yellow card) 78'; Hamrobekov (yellow card) 90+2'	Stadium: Lokomotiv Stadium; Attendance: 2,786; Referee: Rahimbek Karimov

23 June 2022 12	Qizilqum Zarafshon	0 – 2	Pakhtakor Tashkent	Navoiy
20:00 UZT (UTC+5)	Komolafe (yellow card) 45+2'	Report	Alibaev (yellow card) 30'; Hamrobekov (yellow card) 45+2'; Rashidov 69'; Ćeran 90+2' (pen.)	Stadium: Yoshlar Stadium; Attendance: 8,223; Referee: Shavkat Nasibullayev

29 June 2022 13	Pakhtakor Tashkent	2 – 3	Bunyodkor	Tashkent
20:00 UZT (UTC+5)	Fayzullaev 18'; Erkinov (yellow card) 67'; Sayfiev 86'	Report	Khakimov 51'; Rakhmonaliev 81', 90+4' (penalty missed) 90+4'; Tomiwa (yellow card) 90+5'	Stadium: Central Stadium; Attendance: 1,852; Referee: Ilgiz Tantashev

4 July 2022 5	Metallurg Bekabad	0 – 2	Pakhtakor Tashkent	Bekabad
19:00 UZT (UTC+5)	O‘rinboyev (yellow card) 63'; Quttiboyev (yellow card) 72'; Toshpo‘latov (yellow card) 81'	Report	Fayzullaev (yellow card) 26' (goal) 67'; Turgunboev 65'; Kholmatov (yellow card) 85'; Sabirkhodjaev (yellow card) 88'	Stadium: Metallurg Bekabad Stadium; Attendance: 3,212; Referee: Elyor Tursunov

1 August 2022 14	Pakhtakor Tashkent	3 – 2	Dinamo Samarqand	Tashkent
20:00 UZT (UTC+5)	Banaszak (yellow card) 22' (goal) 80'; Khamdamov 28'; Alibaev (yellow card) 43'; Ćeran 45+1'	Report	Bikmaev 19', 70' (pen.); Grigalashvili (yellow card) 40'; Boydullayev (yellow card) 55'; Jumayev (yellow card) 90+2'	Stadium: Central Stadium; Attendance: 1,057; Referee: Aziz Asimov

6 August 2022 11	Sogdiana Jizzakh	2 – 2	Pakhtakor Tashkent	Jizzakh
19:00 UZT (UTC+5)	Kolaković 45+1'; Norkhonov 90+14'	Report	Sabirkhodjaev 8' (yellow card) 90+5'; Ćeran 19'; Hamrobekov (red card) 52'; Martinović (yellow card) 90+2'	Stadium: Sogdiana Stadium; Attendance: 7,256; Referee: Vadim Agishev

12 August 2022 15	Neftchi Fergana	0 – 2	Pakhtakor Tashkent	Yaypan
19:00 UZT (UTC+5)	Quttiboyev (yellow card) 5'; Kilichev (yellow card) 24'; Ubaydullayev (penalty missed) 45+1'; Abdullajonov (red card) 68'; G‘ofurov (yellow card) 90+4'	Report	Sabirkhodjaev 29'; Nasonov (yellow card) 45+1'; Ćeran 72'	Stadium: Uzbekistan Stadium; Attendance: 2,400; Referee: Ilgiz Tantashev

17 August 2022 16	Pakhtakor Tashkent	1 – 1	Olympic Tashkent	Tashkent
19:00 UZT (UTC+5)	Alibaev (yellow card) 45+1'; Banaszak 46'; Martinović (yellow card) 90'	Report	Ibrohimov (yellow card) 39'; Jo‘raqo‘ziyev 61'; Abduxoliqov (red card) 89'	Stadium: JAR Stadium; Attendance: 1,212; Referee: Shavkat Nasibullayev

28 August 2022 17	Navbahor Namangan	1 – 1	Pakhtakor Tashkent	Namangan
19:00 UZT (UTC+5)	Iskanderov 47'; Boltaboev (yellow card) 80'	Report	Alijonov 52'; Azmiddinov (yellow card) 77'	Stadium: Markaziy Stadium; Attendance: 16,950; Referee: Akobir Shukrullayev

9 September 2022 18	Pakhtakor Tashkent	2 – 1	Metallurg Bekabad	Tashkent
19:30 UZT (UTC+5)	Banaszak 34'; Hamrobekov (yellow card) 41'; Fayzullaev 56'; Azmiddinov (yellow card) 88'	Report	O‘rinboyev 24' (pen.); Palić (yellow card) 33'; Abdumannonov (yellow card) 48'; Lobanov (yellow card) 56'; Bekmurodov (yellow card) 63'	Stadium: Central Stadium; Attendance: 712; Referee: Firdavs Norsafarov

15 September 2022 19	AGMK	0 – 2	Pakhtakor Tashkent	Olmaliq
19:00 UZT (UTC+5)	Abdullayev (yellow card) 66'	Report	Alijonov (yellow card) 52' (goal) 54'; Kuvvatov (yellow card) 83'; Ćeran 85'; Sayfiev (yellow card) 89'	Stadium: AGMK Stadium; Attendance: 2,235; Referee: Ahrol Risqulloyev

2 October 2022 20	Pakhtakor Tashkent	0 – 1	Nasaf	Tashkent
18:00 UZT (UTC+5)	Khamdamov (yellow card) 11'; Hamrobekov (yellow card) 39'	Report	Saitov 27'; Mozgovoy (yellow card) 75'; Aliqulov (yellow card) 89'	Stadium: Central Stadium; Attendance: 11,260; Referee: Temur To‘xtasinov

9 October 2022 21	Surkhon Termez	1 – 1	Pakhtakor Tashkent	Olmaliq
17:00 UZT (UTC+5)	Sánchez 2' (pen.); Shaydulov (yellow card) 69'; Quezada (yellow card) 90+3'	Report	Fayzullaev 31'; Azmiddinov (yellow card) 90+3'	Stadium: AGMK Stadium; Attendance: 849; Referee: Vadim Agishev

18 October 2022 22	Pakhtakor Tashkent	5 – 2	Kokand 1912	Tashkent
18:30 UZT (UTC+5)	Ćeran 35', 39', 50', 78' (pen.); Sabirkhodjaev 59'	Report	Sidikov 29'; Lukić (yellow card) 40'; Rustamov 45+2'; Vahobov (yellow card) 57'; Hojimirzayev (yellow card) 88'	Stadium: Central Stadium; Attendance: 1,042; Referee: Ravshan Abduvohidov

24 October 2022 23	Pakhtakor Tashkent	2 – 0	Lokomotiv Tashkent	Tashkent
18:30 UZT (UTC+5)	Fayzullaev 26'; Ćeran 38'; Hamrobekov (yellow card) 69'; Tursunov (yellow card) 83'; Alibaev (yellow card) 88'	Report	Salimov (yellow card) 40'; Rashidxonov (yellow card) 56'; Komilov (yellow card) 58'; Etame (yellow card) 88'	Stadium: Central Stadium; Attendance: 311; Referee: Rustam Lutfullin

2 November 2022 24	Pakhtakor Tashkent	2 – 0	Sogdiana Jizzakh	Tashkent
18:30 UZT (UTC+5)	Khamdamov 5'; Turgunboev (yellow card) 40'; Alijonov 48' (yellow card) 73'	Report	Shayqulov (yellow card) 19'	Stadium: Central Stadium; Attendance: 483; Referee: Temur To‘xtasinov

7 November 2022 25	Pakhtakor Tashkent	6 – 0	Qizilqum Zarafshon	Tashkent
18:30 UZT (UTC+5)	Ćeran 3', 20', 53', 63'; Khamdamov 60'; Turgunboev 69'	Report	Qambarov (yellow card) 27'; Tolmasov (yellow card) 36'; Usmonov (yellow card) 73'	Stadium: Central Stadium; Attendance: 876; Referee: Akobir Shukrullayev

12 November 2022 26	Bunyodkor	0 – 2	Pakhtakor Tashkent	Tashkent
17:00 UZT (UTC+5)	Makhamadzhonov (yellow card) 16'; Ergashev (yellow card) 56'; Ulmasaliev (yellow card) 76'; Yakubov (yellow card) 79'; Omonaliev (red card) 82'	Report	Ćeran 14'; Turgunboev 16'; Sayfiev (yellow card) 75'; Azmiddinov (yellow card) 90+4'	Stadium: JAR Stadium; Attendance: 7,614; Referee: Ahrol Risqullayev

=== Uzbek Cup ===
23 August 2022 Round of 16	Pakhtakor Tashkent	5 – 0	Shurtan Guzar	Tashkent
19:00 UZT (UTC+5)	Fayzullaev 1', 63'; Sayfiev (yellow card) 3'; Ortiqboyev (yellow card) 45'; Khamdamov 56'; Nasonov 71'; Urinbaev 88'	Report	Jorayev (yellow card) 18'; Omonjonov (yellow card) 49'; Nabiyev (yellow card) 80'	Stadium: Central Stadium; Referee: Doston Mirzaraimov

2 September 2022 Quarterfinal	Navbahor Namangan	2 – 1	Pakhtakor Tashkent	Namangan
20:00 UZT (UTC+5)	Iskanderov 17' (pen.), 51' (pen.); Ashurmatov (yellow card) 71'; Boltaboev (yellow card) 90'; Yusupov (yellow card) 90+1'	Report	Azmiddinov 15'; Sayfiev (yellow card) 20'; Alibaev (yellow card) 48'; Ćeran (yellow card) 78'; Hamrobekov (yellow card) 83'; Alijonov (yellow card) 90+1'	Stadium: Markaziy Stadium; Referee: Rahimbek Karimov

=== AFC Champions League ===
==== Group stages ====
Pos	Team	Pld	W	D	L	GF	GA	GD	Pts	Qualification
1	(Qatar) Al-Duhail	6	5	0	1	17	9	+8	15	Advance to Round of 16
2	(Saudi Arabia) Al-Taawoun (H)	6	2	1	3	13	12	+1	7 (Note: Head-to-head points: Al-Taawoun 4, Sepahan 1.)	
3	(Iran) Sepahan	6	2	1	3	8	12	−4	7	
4	(Uzbekistan) Pakhtakor	6	2	0	4	10	15	−5	6	

Source: AFC
Rules for classification: Tiebreakers
(H) Hosts
Notes:

7 April 2022 1	Pakhtakor Tashkent (Uzbekistan)	1 – 3	(Iran) Sepahan	Buraidah, Saudi Arabia
22:15 UZT (UTC+5)	Ćeran 28'; Hadzhiev (yellow card) 64'	Report	Moghanlou (yellow card) 25' (goal) 49', 55'; Rafiei (yellow card) 33'; Karimi (yellow card) 34'; Hosseini 70'	Stadium: King Abdullah Sport City Stadium; Attendance: 15; Referee: Adham Makhadmeh (Jordan)

11 April 2022 2	Al-Taawoun (Saudi Arabia)	0 – 1	(Uzbekistan) Pakhtakor Tashkent	Buraidah, Saudi Arabia
01:15 UZT (UTC+5)	Al-Mousa (red card) 90+7'; Tawamba (yellow card) 90+8'	Report	Ćeran (yellow card) 44'; Erkinov 83'; Alibaev (yellow card) 88'; Azamov (yellow card) 90'	Stadium: King Abdullah Sport City Stadium; Attendance: 4,105; Referee: Hiroyuki Kimura (Japan)

14 April 2022 3	Al-Duhail (Qatar)	3 – 2	(Uzbekistan) Pakhtakor Tashkent	Buraidah, Saudi Arabia
22:15 UZT (UTC+5)	Edmilson 66', 71', 84'; Madibo (yellow card) 87'	Report	Sarkic 44'; Hamrobekov (yellow card) 54'; Sabirkhodjaev 69'; Yakubov (yellow card) 88'	Stadium: King Abdullah Sport City Stadium; Attendance: 136; Referee: Kim Dae-yong (South Korea)

18 April 2022 4	Pakhtakor Tashkent (Uzbekistan)	0 – 3	(Qatar) Al-Duhail	Buraidah, Saudi Arabia
22:15 UZT (UTC+5)	Sayfiev (yellow card) 11'; Alijonov (yellow card) 42'; Mirakhmadov (yellow card) 63' (yellow-red card) 90+2'; Turgunboev (yellow card) 73'; Alibaev (yellow card) 90+1'	Report	Al-Rawi 32'; Olunga 45+2'; Ali 47'; Madibo (yellow card) 61'	Stadium: King Abdullah Sport City Stadium; Attendance: 82; Referee: Mohd Amirul Izwan Yaacob (Malaysia)

22 April 2022 5	Sepahan (Iran)	2 – 1	(Uzbekistan) Pakhtakor Tashkent	Buraidah, Saudi Arabia
22:15 UZT (UTC+5)	Ahmadzadeh (yellow card) 40'; Karimi (yellow card) 59'; Shahbazzadeh 76', 90+3'; Moghanlou (yellow card) 80'	Report	Sabirkhodjaev (yellow card) 44'; Hamrobekov (yellow card) 74'; Alijonov 79'; Azamov (yellow card) 83'	Stadium: King Abdullah Sport City Stadium; Attendance: 20; Referee: Jumpei Iida (Japan)

27 April 2022 6	Pakhtakor Tashkent (Uzbekistan)	5 – 4	(Saudi Arabia) Al-Taawoun	Buraidah, Saudi Arabia
01:15 UZT (UTC+5)	Fayzullayev (yellow card) 16' (goal) 22'; Hadzhiev (yellow card) 27'; Turgunboev 31' (yellow card) 90+3'; Sabirkhodjaev 32'; Mirakhmadov 78' (yellow card) 84'; Alibaev (yellow card) 82'; Sayfiev (yellow card) 82'; Ergashboyev 86'	Report	Al-Bakr 14'; Al-Amri (yellow card) 36' (goal) 83' (pen.); Al-Nabit 51', 60'; Al-Sobhi (yellow card) 72'	Stadium: King Abdullah Sport City Stadium; Attendance: 2,681; Referee: Ma Ning (China)

== Squad statistics ==
As of match played 12 November 2022

=== Appearances and goals ===
No.	Pos	Nat	Player	Total		Super League		Uzbek Cup		Uzbekistan Super Cup		AFC Champions League	
No.	Pos	Nat	Player	Apps	Goals	Apps	Goals	Apps	Goals	Apps	Goals	Apps	Goals
2	MF	(Uzbekistan) UZB	Behruzbek Asqarov	2	0	0+2	0	0	0	0	0	0	0
3	DF	(Uzbekistan) UZB	Khojiakbar Alijonov	31	4	19+3	3	2	0	1	0	6	1
4	DF	(Uzbekistan) UZB	Dostonbek Tursunov	8	0	6+1	0	0+1	0	0	0	0	0
5	DF	(Ukraine) UKR	Oleksandr Nasonov	12	1	8+2	0	2	1	0	0	0	0
6	MF	(Uzbekistan) UZB	Ikromjon Alibaev	26	0	12+6	0	2	0	1	0	3+2	0
7	MF	(Uzbekistan) UZB	Odiljon Hamrobekov	31	0	23	0	2	0	1	0	5	0
8	MF	(Uzbekistan) UZB	Azizbek Turgunboev	35	4	23+3	3	0+2	0	1	0	5+1	1
10	FW	(Serbia) SRB	Dragan Ćeran	28	22	22+1	20	1	0	1	1	3	1
13	DF	(Montenegro) MNE	Ilija Martinović	7	0	7	0	0	0	0	0	0	0
16	MF	(Uzbekistan) UZB	Ruslan Roziyev	1	0	0+1	0	0	0	0	0	0	0
17	MF	(Uzbekistan) UZB	Dostonbek Khamdamov	16	4	13+1	3	1+1	1	0	0	0	0
19	FW	(Poland) POL	Przemysław Banaszak	10	3	8	3	2	0	0	0	0	0
23	DF	(Uzbekistan) UZB	Sherzod Azamov	14	0	7+3	0	0	0	0	0	4	0
27	MF	(Uzbekistan) UZB	Sardor Sabirkhodjaev	34	5	25+1	3	1	0	1	0	6	2
28	MF	(Uzbekistan) UZB	Diyor Kholmatov	17	0	3+9	0	1	0	0	0	0+4	0
33	GK	(Uzbekistan) UZB	Eldorbek Suyunov	15	0	9	0	1	0	1	0	4	0
34	DF	(Uzbekistan) UZB	Farrukh Sayfiev	34	2	25	2	2	0	1	0	6	0
35	GK	(Uzbekistan) UZB	Sanjar Kuvvatov	21	0	17	0	1	0	0+1	0	2	0
36	FW	(Uzbekistan) UZB	Abbos Ergashboev	4	1	0+3	0	0	0	0	0	0+1	1
42	MF	(Uzbekistan) UZB	Abbosbek Fayzullayev	26	8	9+12	5	1+1	2	0	0	1+2	1
46	DF	(Uzbekistan) UZB	Shahriyor Jabborov	6	0	1+3	0	0+1	0	0	0	0+1	0
59	MF	(Uzbekistan) UZB	Diyorbek Ortiqboyev	1	0	0	0	1	0	0	0	0	0
63	FW	(Uzbekistan) UZB	Muhammadali Urinbaev	11	1	0+9	0	0+2	1	0	0	0	0
66	FW	(Uzbekistan) UZB	Rustam Turdimurodov	4	0	1+3	0	0	0	0	0	0	0
88	DF	(Uzbekistan) UZB	Shahzod Azmiddinov	17	1	11+2	0	2	1	0	0	1+1	0
Players away on loan:
77	FW	(Uzbekistan) UZB	Mirzhakhon Mirakhmadov	11	1	3+5	0	0	0	0	0	1+2	1
Players who left Pakhtakor Tashkent during the season:
5	DF	(Ukraine) UKR	Oleksiy Larin	14	0	8	0	0	0	1	0	5	0
11	FW	(Uzbekistan) UZB	Sardor Rashidov	13	1	5+2	1	0	0	1	0	4+1	0
14	FW	(Montenegro) MNE	Oliver Sarkic	14	4	5+4	3	0	0	0+1	0	4	1
18	MF	(Uzbekistan) UZB	Khojimat Erkinov	18	2	6+5	1	0	0	0+1	0	4+2	1
19	DF	(Uzbekistan) UZB	Behzod Ne'matov	1	0	0+1	0	0	0	0	0	0	0
21	DF	(Bulgaria) BUL	Kamen Hadzhiev	14	0	9+1	0	0	0	1	0	3	0
29	DF	(Uzbekistan) UZB	Zhasur Yakubov	5	0	1	0	0	0	0+1	0	0+3	0

=== Goal scorers ===
Place	Position	Nation	Number	Name	Super League	Uzbekistan Cup	Uzbekistan Super Cup	AFC Champions League	Total
1	FW	(Serbia)	10	Dragan Ćeran	20	0	1	1	22
2	MF	(Uzbekistan)	42	Abbosbek Fayzullayev	5	2	0	1	8
3	MF	(Uzbekistan)	27	Sardor Sabirkhodjaev	3	0	0	2	5
4	MF	(Uzbekistan)	17	Dostonbek Khamdamov	3	1	0	0	4
4	DF	(Uzbekistan)	3	Khojiakbar Alijonov	3	0	0	1	4
4	MF	(Uzbekistan)	8	Azizbek Turgunboev	3	0	0	1	4
4	FW	(Montenegro)	14	Oliver Sarkic	3	0	0	1	4
8	FW	(Poland)	19	Przemysław Banaszak	3	0	0	0	3
9	DF	(Uzbekistan)	34	Farrukh Sayfiev	2	0	0	0	2
9	MF	(Uzbekistan)	18	Khojimat Erkinov	1	0	0	1	2
11	FW	(Uzbekistan)	11	Sardor Rashidov	1	0	0	0	1
11	DF	(Ukraine)	5	Oleksandr Nasonov	0	1	0	0	1
11	FW	(Uzbekistan)	63	Muhammadali Urinbaev	0	1	0	0	1
11	DF	(Uzbekistan)	88	Shahzod Azmiddinov	0	1	0	0	1
11	FW	(Uzbekistan)	77	Mirjakhon Mirakhmadov	0	0	0	1	1
11	FW	(Uzbekistan)	36	Abbos Ergashboev	0	0	0	1	1
				TOTALS	47	6	1	10	64

=== Clean sheets ===
Place	Position	Nation	Number	Name	Super League	Uzbekistan Cup	Uzbekistan Super Cup	AFC Champions League	Total
1	GK	(Uzbekistan)	33	Eldorbek Suyunov	6	1	1	1	9
2	GK	(Uzbekistan)	35	Sanjar Kuvvatov	8	0	0	0	8
				TOTALS	14	1	1	1	17

=== Disciplinary record ===
Number	Nation	Position	Name	Super League		Uzbekistan Cup		Uzbekistan Super Cup		AFC Champions League		Total	
Number	Nation	Position	Name	Yellow card	Red card	Yellow card	Red card	Yellow card	Red card	Yellow card	Red card	Yellow card	Red card
3	(Uzbekistan)	DF	Khojiakbar Alijonov	4	0	1	0	0	0	1	0	6	0
4	(Uzbekistan)	DF	Dostonbek Tursunov	1	0	0	0	0	0	0	0	1	0
5	(Ukraine)	DF	Oleksandr Nasonov	1	0	0	0	0	0	0	0	1	0
6	(Uzbekistan)	MF	Ikromjon Alibaev	5	1	1	0	1	0	3	0	10	1
7	(Uzbekistan)	MF	Odiljon Hamrobekov	7	1	1	0	1	0	2	0	11	1
8	(Uzbekistan)	MF	Azizbek Turgunboev	1	0	0	0	1	0	2	0	4	0
10	(Serbia)	FW	Dragan Ćeran	1	0	1	0	1	0	1	0	4	0
13	(Montenegro)	MF	Ilija Martinović	2	0	0	0	0	0	0	0	2	0
17	(Uzbekistan)	MF	Dostonbek Khamdamov	1	0	0	0	0	0	0	0	1	0
19	(Poland)	FW	Przemysław Banaszak	1	0	0	0	0	0	0	0	1	0
23	(Uzbekistan)	DF	Sherzod Azamov	1	1	0	0	0	0	2	0	3	1
27	(Uzbekistan)	MF	Sardor Sabirkhodjaev	3	0	0	0	0	0	1	0	4	0
28	(Uzbekistan)	MF	Diyor Kholmatov	1	0	0	0	0	0	0	0	1	0
33	(Uzbekistan)	GK	Eldorbek Suyunov	1	1	0	0	0	0	0	0	1	1
34	(Uzbekistan)	DF	Farrukh Sayfiev	5	0	2	0	1	0	2	0	10	0
35	(Uzbekistan)	GK	Sanjar Kuvvatov	1	0	0	0	1	0	0	0	2	0
42	(Uzbekistan)	MF	Abbosbek Fayzullayev	2	0	0	0	0	0	1	0	3	0
59	(Uzbekistan)	MF	Diyorbek Ortiqboyev	0	0	1	0	0	0	0	0	1	0
77	(Uzbekistan)	FW	Mirjakhon Mirakhmadov	0	0	0	0	0	0	3	1	3	1
88	(Uzbekistan)	DF	Shahzod Azmiddinov	4	0	0	0	0	0	1	0	5	0
Players who left Pakhtakor Tashkent during the season:
5	(Ukraine)	DF	Oleksiy Larin	1	0	0	0	0	0	0	0	1	0
14	(Montenegro)	FW	Oliver Sarkic	2	0	0	0	0	0	0	0	2	0
18	(Uzbekistan)	MF	Khojimat Erkinov	1	0	0	0	0	0	0	0	1	0
21	(Bulgaria)	DF	Kamen Hadzhiev	4	0	0	0	0	0	2	0	6	0
29	(Uzbekistan)	DF	Zhasur Yakubov	1	0	0	0	0	0	1	0	2	0
			TOTALS	51	4	7	0	6	0	22	1	86	5
