= 2020 Pakhtakor Tashkent FK season =

Pakhtakor Tashkent
2020 season
- Chairman: Bobur Shodiev
- Manager: Shota Arveladze
- Uzbek League: 1st
- Uzbekistan Cup: Champions
- AFC Champions League: Quarterfinal vs Persepolis
- Top goalscorer: League: Dragan Ćeran (21); All: Dragan Ćeran (26)
| Home colours | Away colours |

The 2020 season was Pakhtakor Tashkent's 29th season in the Uzbek League in Uzbekistan.

== Season events ==
On 16 March, all football in Uzbekistan was suspended due to the COVID-19 pandemic in Uzbekistan.

On 20 July, the Uzbekistan Super League was suspended for a second time due to the COVID-19 pandemic in Uzbekistan, with it being announced on 24 July that the league would resume on 3 August with the scheduled 10th round matches.

== Squad ==
As of match played 20 December 2020

| No. | Name | Nationality | Position | Date of birth (age) | Signed from | Signed in | Contract ends | Apps. | Goals |
Goalkeepers
| 25 | Eldorbek Suyunov | (Uzbekistan) | GK | 12 April 1991 (aged 29) | Nasaf | 2017 | | 76 | 0 |
| 35 | Sanjar Kuvvatov | (Uzbekistan) | GK | 8 January 1990 (aged 30) | Nasaf | 2019 | | 37 | 0 |
| 44 | Azizkhon Isokov | (Uzbekistan) | GK | 23 December 2000 (aged 19) | Academy | 2020 | | 0 | 0 |
Defenders
| 3 | Khojiakbar Alijonov | (Uzbekistan) | DF | 19 April 1997 (aged 23) | Academy | 2017 | | 87 | 3 |
| 4 | Akramjon Komilov | (Uzbekistan) | DF | 14 March 1996 (aged 24) | Bunyodkor | 2019 | | 33 | 2 |
| 5 | Anzur Ismailov | (Uzbekistan) | DF | 21 April 1985 (aged 35) | Lokomotiv Tashkent | 2020 | | | |
| 6 | Alisher Salimov | (Uzbekistan) | DF | 2 July 1999 (aged 21) | Academy | 2019 | | 9 | 0 |
| 15 | Egor Krimets | (Uzbekistan) | DF | 27 January 1992 (aged 28) | Academy | 2011 | | | |
| 23 | Sherzod Azamov | (Uzbekistan) | DF | 14 January 1990 (aged 30) | Nasaf | 2017 | | 96 | 3 |
| 34 | Farrukh Sayfiev | (Uzbekistan) | DF | 17 January 1991 (aged 29) | Nasaf | 2018 | | 98 | 6 |
| 88 | Shahzod Azmiddinov | (Uzbekistan) | DF | 7 August 2000 (aged 20) | Academy | 2020 | | 1 | 0 |
Midfielders
| 7 | Sadriddin Abdullaev | (Uzbekistan) | MF | 11 June 1986 (aged 34) | Lokomotiv Tashkent | 2019 | | | |
| 8 | Asadbek Sobirjonov | (Uzbekistan) | MF | 3 August 2000 (aged 20) | Youth Team | 2019 | | 14 | 1 |
| 9 | Jaloliddin Masharipov | (Uzbekistan) | MF | 1 September 1993 (aged 27) | Youth Team | 2013 | | 201 | 33 |
| 17 | Dostonbek Khamdamov | (Uzbekistan) | MF | 24 July 1996 (aged 24) | Anzhi Makhachkala | 2019 | | 74 | 23 |
| 18 | Khojimat Erkinov | (Uzbekistan) | MF | 29 May 2001 (aged 19) | Youth Team | 2019 | | 8 | 0 |
| 20 | Odiljon Hamrobekov | (Uzbekistan) | MF | 13 February 1996 (aged 24) | Nasaf | 2019 | | 65 | 1 |
| 21 | Abror Ismoilov | (Uzbekistan) | MF | 8 January 1998 (aged 22) | Surkhon | 2020 | | 30 | 3 |
| 27 | Sardor Sabirkhodjaev | (Uzbekistan) | MF | 6 November 1994 (aged 26) | Bunyodkor | 2019 | | 70 | 6 |
| 28 | Diyor Kholmatov | (Uzbekistan) | MF | 22 July 2002 (aged 18) | Youth Team | 2020 | | 3 | 1 |
| 29 | Vladimir Kozak | (Uzbekistan) | MF | 12 June 1993 (aged 27) | Youth Team | 2010 | | 282 | 24 |
| 99 | Javokhir Sidikov | (Uzbekistan) | MF | 8 December 1996 (aged 24) | loan from Kokand 1912 | 2019 | 2020 | 36 | 5 |
Forwards
| 10 | Dragan Ćeran | (Serbia) | FW | 6 October 1987 (aged 33) | Nasaf | 2018 | | 97 | 67 |
| 11 | Igor Sergeev | (Uzbekistan) | FW | 30 April 1993 (aged 27) | Al Dhafra | 2018 | | 243 | 125 |
| 76 | Ulugbek Khoshimov | (Uzbekistan) | FW | 3 January 2001 (aged 19) | Youth Team | 2020 | | 1 | 0 |
| 77 | Eren Derdiyok | (Switzerland) | FW | 12 June 1988 (aged 32) | Göztepe | 2020 | | 33 | 14 |
Players away on loan
| 14 | Khumoyunmirzo Iminov | (Uzbekistan) | MF | 15 January 2000 (aged 20) | Youth Team | 2019 | | 8 | 0 |
| 22 | Jasurbek Yakhshiboev | (Uzbekistan) | MF | 24 June 1997 (aged 23) | Youth Team | 2016 | | 55 | 5 |
| | Umar Eshmurodov | (Uzbekistan) | DF | 30 November 1992 (aged 28) | Nasaf | 2019 | | 0 | 0 |
| | Khusniddin Gofurov | (Uzbekistan) | DF | 20 March 1997 (aged 23) | Neftchi Fergana | 2018 | | 0 | 0 |
| | Ibrokhimkhalil Yuldashev | (Uzbekistan) | DF | 14 February 2001 (aged 19) | Youth team | 2019 | | 1 | 0 |
| | Jakhongir Akhmadov | (Uzbekistan) | MF | 21 September 1998 (aged 22) | Youth team | 2018 | | 8 | 0 |
| | Husniddin Gafurov | (Uzbekistan) | MF | 29 July 1994 (aged 26) | Lokomotiv Tashkent | 2019 | | 12 | 0 |
| | Doston Ibragimov | (Uzbekistan) | MF | 23 January 1997 (aged 23) | Dinamo Samarqand | 2017 | | 22 | 2 |
| | Sukhrob Nurullaev | (Uzbekistan) | FW | 4 January 1998 (aged 22) | Youth team | 2018 | | 30 | 3 |
| | Shokhrukh Makhmudkhozhiev | (Uzbekistan) | FW | 19 July 1998 (aged 22) | Youth team | 2018 | | 8 | 3 |
Players who left during the season

=== Out on loan ===
Note: Flags indicate national team as defined under FIFA eligibility rules; some limited exceptions apply. Players may hold more than one non-FIFA nationality.

| No. | Pos. | Nation | Player |
|---|---|---|---|
| 14 | MF | UZB | Khumoyunmirzo Iminov (at Energetik-BGU Minsk) |
| 22 | MF | UZB | Jasurbek Yakhshiboev (at Shakhtyor Soligorsk) |
| — | DF | UZB | Umar Eshmurodov (at Nasaf) |
| — | DF | UZB | Khusniddin Gofurov (at Surkhon) |
| — | DF | UZB | Ibrokhimkhalil Yuldashev (at Bunyodkor) |

| No. | Pos. | Nation | Player |
|---|---|---|---|
| — | MF | UZB | Jakhongir Akhmadov (at Dinamo Samarqand) |
| — | MF | UZB | Husniddin Gafurov (at Surkhon) |
| — | MF | UZB | Doston Ibragimov (at Qizilqum Zarafshon) |
| — | MF | UZB | Sukhrob Nurullaev (at Kokand 1912) |
| — | FW | UZB | Shokhrukh Makhmudkhozhiev (at Navbahor Namangan) |

== Transfers ==
=== Winter ===
In: Note: Flags indicate national team as defined under FIFA eligibility rules; some limited exceptions apply. Players may hold more than one non-FIFA nationality.

| No. | Pos. | Nation | Player |
|---|---|---|---|
| 21 | MF | UZB | Abror Ismoilov (from (Uzbekistan) Surkhon) |
| 77 | FW | SUI | Eren Derdiyok (from (Turkey) Göztepe) |
| 99 | MF | UZB | Javokhir Sidikov (from (Uzbekistan) Kokand 1912) |
| — | DF | UZB | Umar Eshmurodov (from (Uzbekistan) Nasaf) |

Out: Note: Flags indicate national team as defined under FIFA eligibility rules; some limited exceptions apply. Players may hold more than one non-FIFA nationality.

| No. | Pos. | Nation | Player |
|---|---|---|---|
| 8 | MF | UZB | Dilshod Rakhmatullaev (to (Uzbekistan) Nasaf) |
| 18 | MF | UZB | Bakhrom Abdurakhimov (to (Uzbekistan) AGMK) |
| 21 | FW | UZB | Marat Bikmaev (to (Uzbekistan) Lokomotiv Tashkent) |
| 22 | MF | UZB | Jasurbek Yakhshiboev (loan to (Belarus) Energetik-BGU Minsk) |
| 55 | MF | MNE | Marko Simić |
| — | DF | UZB | Umar Eshmurodov (loan to (Uzbekistan) Nasaf) |
| — | DF | UZB | Ibrokhimkhalil Yuldashev (loan to (Uzbekistan) Bunyodkor) |
| — | DF | UZB | Khusniddin Gofurov (loan to (Uzbekistan) Surkhon) |
| — | DF | UZB | Bobur Askarov (to (Uzbekistan) Lokomotiv Tashkent) |
| — | MF | UZB | Sobit Sindarov (to (Uzbekistan) Kokand 1912) |
| — | MF | UZB | Jakhongir Akhmadov (loan to (Uzbekistan) Dinamo Samarqand) |
| — | MF | UZB | Husniddin Gafurov (loan to (Uzbekistan) Surkhon) |
| — | MF | UZB | Doston Ibragimov (loan to (Uzbekistan) Qizilqum Zarafshon) |
| — | MF | UZB | Sukhrob Nurullaev (loan to (Uzbekistan) Kokand 1912) |
| — | FW | UZB | Shokhrukh Makhmudkhozhiev (loan to (Uzbekistan) Navbahor Namangan) |
| — | FW | UZB | Andrey Sidorov (to (Tajikistan) Khujand) |

=== Summer ===
In: Note: Flags indicate national team as defined under FIFA eligibility rules; some limited exceptions apply. Players may hold more than one non-FIFA nationality.

| No. | Pos. | Nation | Player |
|---|---|---|---|
| 18 | MF | UZB | Khojimat Erkinov (loan return from (Uzbekistan) AGMK) |

Out: Note: Flags indicate national team as defined under FIFA eligibility rules; some limited exceptions apply. Players may hold more than one non-FIFA nationality.

| No. | Pos. | Nation | Player |
|---|---|---|---|
| 14 | MF | UZB | Khumoyunmirzo Iminov (loan to (Belarus) Energetik-BGU Minsk) |
| — | MF | UZB | Jasurbek Yakhshiboev (loan to (Belarus) Shakhtyor Soligorsk, previously on loan to (Belarus) Energetik-BGU Minsk) |

== Friendlies ==
| | – |
| UZT (UTC+5) |

== Competitions ==
=== Uzbek League ===
==== League table ====
| Pos | Team | Pld | W | D | L | GF | GA | GD | Pts | Qualification or relegation |
|---|---|---|---|---|---|---|---|---|---|---|
| 1 | Pakhtakor (C) | 26 | 21 | 2 | 3 | 76 | 18 | +58 | 65 | Qualification to the 2021 AFC Champions League group stage |
| 2 | Nasaf | 26 | 15 | 8 | 3 | 47 | 19 | +28 | 53 | Qualification to the 2021 AFC Cup group stage |
| 3 | AGMK | 26 | 14 | 7 | 5 | 39 | 28 | +11 | 49 | Qualification to the 2021 AFC Champions League play-off round |
| 4 | Bunyodkor | 26 | 12 | 7 | 7 | 43 | 36 | +7 | 43 | |
| 5 | Kokand 1912 | 26 | 13 | 3 | 10 | 35 | 28 | +7 | 42 | |

Source: Uzbekistan Professional Football League
Rules for classification: 1) points; 2) head-to-head points; 3) head-to-head goal difference; 4) head-to-head away goals scored; 5) goal difference; 6) number of goals scored.
(C) Champions

==== Results summary ====
| Overall | | | | | | | | Home | | | | | | Away | | | | | |
| Pld | W | D | L | GF | GA | GD | Pts | W | D | L | GF | GA | GD | W | D | L | GF | GA | GD |
|---|---|---|---|---|---|---|---|---|---|---|---|---|---|---|---|---|---|---|---|
| 26 | 21 | 2 | 3 | 76 | 18 | +58 | 65 | 12 | 1 | 0 | 42 | 8 | +34 | 9 | 1 | 3 | 34 | 10 | +24 |

Last updated: 3 December 2020.
Source: See Results

==== Results by round ====
| Round | 1 | 2 | 3 | 4 | 5 | 6 | 7 | 8 | 9 | 10 | 11 | 12 | 13 | 14 | 15 | 16 | 17 | 18 | 19 | 20 | 21 | 22 | 23 | 24 | 25 | 26 |
|---|---|---|---|---|---|---|---|---|---|---|---|---|---|---|---|---|---|---|---|---|---|---|---|---|---|---|
| Ground | H | H | H | A | H | A | H | H | H | A | H | H | A | A | A | A | H | H | A | A | A | A | H | A | A | H |
| Result | W | W | W | L | W | W | W | W | D | W | W | W | W | D | W | W | W | W | W | W | W | L | W | L | W | W |
| Position | 5 | 1 | 1 | 3 | 1 | 1 | 1 | 1 | 1 | 1 | 1 | 1 | 1 | 1 | 1 | 1 | 1 | 1 | 1 | 1 | 1 | 1 | 1 | 1 | 1 | 1 |

Source: See Results
A = Away; H = Home; W = Win; D = Draw; L = Loss

==== Results ====
| 27 February 2020 1 | Pakhtakor Tashkent | 2 – 1 | Navbahor Namangan | Tashkent |
| 16:00 UZT (UTC+5) | Alijonov (yellow card) 12'; Sergeev 50', 88'; Krimets (yellow card) 24' (yellow-red card) 78'; Sabirkhodjaev (yellow card) 40'; Derdiyok (yellow card) 72'; Sayfiev (yellow card) 90' | Report | I.Isokjonov (yellow card) 21' (yellow-red card) 45'; Solovyov 26' (yellow card) 29'; K.Mukhtorov (yellow card) 81'; Yusupov (yellow card) 89' | Stadium: Central Stadium; Attendance: 15,320; Referee: Ilgiz Tantashev |

| 8 March 2020 2 | Pakhtakor Tashkent | 3 – 0 | Buxoro | Tashkent |
| 17:00 UZT (UTC+5) | Azamov (yellow card) 45'; Ćeran 66', 82' (pen.), 85' | Report | | Stadium: Central Stadium; Attendance: 6,734; Referee: Firdavs Norsafarov |

| 14 March 2020 3 | Pakhtakor Tashkent | 4 – 1 | Metallurg Bekabad | Tashkent |
| 18:15 UZT (UTC+5) | Ćeran 30'; Sergeev 31'; Masharipov 53'; Derdiyok 72' | Report | Tajiev (yellow card) 40'; D.Narzullaev (yellow card) 57'; S.Ubaidullayev (yellow card) 64'; M.Bobojonov 68' | Stadium: Central Stadium; Attendance: 5,324; Referee: Jasur Mukhtorov |

| 14 June 2020 4 | Sogdiana Jizzakh | 1 – 0 | Pakhtakor Tashkent | Jizzakh |
| 18:00 UZT (UTC+5) | Norkhonov (yellow card) 21' (penalty missed) 31' 50'; S.Kulmatov (yellow card) 42'; M.Mitrovic (yellow card) 90' | Report | Krimets (yellow card) 21'; Kuvvatov (yellow card) 30' | Stadium: Sogdiana Stadium; Attendance: 0 Referee: Temur Tukhtasinov |
Note: Match played behind closed doors due to the COVID-19 pandemic in Uzbekistan.

| 19 June 2020 5 | Pakhtakor Tashkent | 5 – 0 | Bunyodkor | Tashkent |
| 20:00 UZT (UTC+5) | Sabirkhodjaev 1'; Masharipov (yellow card) 13'; Ćeran 40', 42'; Derdiyok 45'; Turaev 63' (o.g.) | Report | | Stadium: Central Stadium; Attendance: 0 Referee: Sherzod Kasymov |
Note: Match originally scheduled for 4 April, but postponed due to the COVID-19 pandemic in Uzbekistan. Match played behind closed doors due to the COVID-19 pandemic in Uzbekistan.

| 25 June 2020 6 | Qizilqum Zarafshon | 0 – 2 | Pakhtakor Tashkent | Navoiy |
| 20:15 UZT (UTC+5) | S.Juraev (yellow card) 43' | Report | Khamdamov 47'; Derdiyok 72' | Stadium: Yoshlar Stadium; Attendance: 0 Referee: Firdavs Norsafarov |
Note: Match played behind closed doors due to the COVID-19 pandemic in Uzbekistan.

| 2 July 2020 7 | Pakhtakor Tashkent | 3 – 1 | Surkhon | Tashkent |
| 20:00 UZT (UTC+5) | Sabirkhodjaev 38'; Khamdamov 38'; Ćeran 66' | Report | Kasyan 23' (pen.); Ibragimov (yellow card) 90' | Stadium: Central Stadium; Attendance: 0 Referee: Elyor Tursunov |
Note: Match played behind closed doors due to the COVID-19 pandemic in Uzbekistan.

| 7 July 2020 8 | Pakhtakor Tashkent | 3 – 0 | Mash'al Mubarek | Tashkent |
| 19:00 UZT (UTC+5) | Derdiyok 25', 57'; Ćeran 75' | Report | Ifeanyi (yellow card) 45'; S.Shukirillayev (yellow card) 77' | Stadium: Central Stadium; Attendance: 0 Referee: Zokir Kadyrov |
Note: Match played behind closed doors due to the COVID-19 pandemic in Uzbekistan.

| 13 July 2020 9 | Pakhtakor Tashkent | 2 – 2 | AGMK | Tashkent |
| 20:00 UZT (UTC+5) | Sergeev 72'; Khamdamov 74'; Masharipov (yellow card) 90' | Report | Amanow 33'; Đokić 53' (pen.) | Stadium: Central Stadium; Attendance: 0 Referee: Sherzod Qosimov |
Note: Match played behind closed doors due to the COVID-19 pandemic in Uzbekistan.

| 18 August 2020 10 | Kokand 1912 | 1 – 3 | Pakhtakor Tashkent | Tashkent |
| 19:00 UZT (UTC+5) | Rajevac (yellow card) 20'; Bamba (yellow card) 22'; H.Abduhamidov 81'; Akbarov (yellow card) 86' | Report | Sergeev 25', 43'; Ab.Ismoilov 66'; Kozak (yellow card) 88' | Stadium: Lokomotiv Stadium; Attendance: 0 Referee: Shavkat Nasibullaev |
Note: Match took place at the Lokomotiv Stadium in Tashkent instead of Kokand 1912's regular Kokand Markaziy Stadium in Kokand. Match played behind closed doors due to the COVID-19 pandemic in Uzbekistan.

| 21 August 2020 11 | Pakhtakor Tashkent | 4 – 1 | Nasaf | Tashkent |
| 19:00 UZT (UTC+5) | Ćeran 32' (pen.), 53', 67'; Sergeev 65' (pen.) | Report | Azamov 68' (o.g.) | Stadium: Central Stadium; Attendance: 0 Referee: Akhrol Risqulloev |
Note: Match played behind closed doors due to the COVID-19 pandemic in Uzbekistan.

| 24 August 2020 12 | Pakhtakor Tashkent | 7 – 0 | Lokomotiv Tashkent | Tashkent |
| 18:30 UZT (UTC+5) | Krimets (yellow card) 4'; Ćeran 12'; Sergeev 13', 28'; Khamdamov 31'; Derdiyok 47', 63'; Masharipov 50'; Sidikov (yellow card) 52' | Report | D.Umirov (yellow card) 77'; A.Ulmasaliev (yellow card) 81' | Stadium: Central Stadium; Attendance: 0 Referee: Vadim Agishev |
Note: Match played behind closed doors due to the COVID-19 pandemic in Uzbekistan.

| 27 August 2020 13 | Andijon | 0 – 2 | Pakhtakor Tashkent | Tashkent |
| 19:00 UZT (UTC+5) | Ariwachukwu (yellow card) 41' | Report | Sergeev 19'; Ćeran 42' (pen.); Ismoilov (yellow card) 89' | Stadium: Lokomotiv Stadium; Attendance: 0 Referee: Rahimbek Karimov |
Note: Match took place at the Lokomotiv Stadium in Tashkent instead of Andijon's regular Soghlom Avlod Stadium in Andijan. Match played behind closed doors due to the COVID-19 pandemic in Uzbekistan.

| 1 September 2020 14 | Navbahor Namangan | 1 – 1 | Pakhtakor Tashkent | Namangan |
| 19:00 UZT (UTC+5) | Golban (yellow card) 55'; Turgunboev 73' | Report | Sergeev 12'; Ismailov (yellow card) 53'; Khamdamov (yellow card) 57'; Hamrobekov (yellow card) 81' | Stadium: Markaziy Stadium; Attendance: 0 Referee: Temur Tukhtasinov |
Note: Match played behind closed doors due to the COVID-19 pandemic in Uzbekistan.

| 5 September 2020 15 | Buxoro | 0 – 4 | Pakhtakor Tashkent | Bukhara |
| 18:00 UZT (UTC+5) | M.Fomin (yellow card) 16' | Report | Hamrobekov (yellow card) 19'; Sergeev 31'; Masharipov 35'; Komilov 76'; Ćeran 89' | Stadium: Buxoro Arena; Attendance: 0 Referee: Ravshan Abduvohidov |
Note: Match played behind closed doors due to the COVID-19 pandemic in Uzbekistan.

| 8 September 2020 16 | Metallurg Bekabad | 0 – 3 | Pakhtakor Tashkent | Bekabad |
| 19:00 UZT (UTC+5) | A.Abdulhakov (yellow card) 31'; Otakhonov (yellow card) 45+1' | Report | Ćeran 21'; Alijonov (yellow card) 40'; Sidikov 45+3'; A.Sobirjonov 90+2' | Stadium: Metallurg Bekabad Stadium; Attendance: 0 Referee: Rustam Lutfullin |
Note: Match played behind closed doors due to the COVID-19 pandemic in Uzbekistan.

| 18 October 2020 19 | Pakhtakor Tashkent | 3 – 1 | Qizilqum Zarafshon | Tashkent |
| 17:30 UZT (UTC+5) | Derdiyok 17'; Alijonov (yellow card) 54'; Sayfiev 74'; Ismoilov 76' | Report | Kilichev 28'; A.Sanoev (yellow card) 80'; J.Azimov (yellow card) 86' | Stadium: Central Stadium; Attendance: 432; Referee: Olim Toychibaev |

| 21 October 2020 17 | Pakhtakor Tashkent | 2 – 0 | Sogdiana Jizzakh | Tashkent |
| 18:00 UZT (UTC+5) | Ćeran 45+2'; Khamdamov 74' | Report | | Stadium: Central Stadium; Attendance: 845; Referee: Shavkat Nasibullaev |

| 24 October 2020 20 | Surkhon | 0 – 6 | Pakhtakor Tashkent | Termez |
| 15:30 UZT (UTC+5) | J.Mehmonov (yellow card) 52'; Hojiakbarov (yellow card) 68' | Report | Derdiyok 41'; A.G'ofurov 43' (o.g.); Komilov 45+1'; Sergeev 53'; Masharipov 60'; Sidikov 79' | Stadium: Alpamish Stadium; Attendance: 138; Referee: Temur Tukhtasinov |

| 28 October 2020 21 | Mash'al Mubarek | 1 – 4 | Pakhtakor Tashkent | Muborak |
| 17:00 UZT (UTC+5) | S.Temirov 13' | Report | Ćeran 5'; Khamdamov 31'; Hamrobekov (yellow card) 40'; Ismoilov (yellow card) 45+2'; Sergeev 74'; Ismailov (yellow card) 90'; D.Kholmatov 90+3' | Stadium: Bahrom Vafoev Stadium; Attendance: 565; Referee: Rahimbek Karimov |

| 1 November 2020 22 | AGMK | 0 – 6 | Pakhtakor Tashkent | Olmaliq |
| 17:00 UZT (UTC+5) | Đokić (yellow card) 54'; M.Toshmatov (yellow card) 79' | Report | Masharipov 24'; Khamdamov 32', 71'; Sergeev 43'; Đokić 45+1' (o.g.); Ćeran 60' | Stadium: AGMK Stadium; Attendance: 789; Referee: Akobir Shukrullaev |

| 5 November 2020 18 | Bunyodkor | 3 – 2 | Pakhtakor Tashkent | Tashkent |
| 17:00 UZT (UTC+5) | N.Tukhtasinov 5', 55'; R.Yuldashev (yellow card) 20'; M.Mirakhmadov 81'; S.Izzatov (yellow card) 84'; A.Abdujalilov (yellow card) 85' | Report | Sergeev (yellow card) 21'; Masharipov 26' (red card) 83'; Alijonov (yellow card) 38' (yellow-red card) 82'; Krimets (yellow card) 38'; A.Abdullayev 80' (o.g.) | Stadium: Central Stadium; Attendance: 1,510; Referee: Akhrol Risqulloev |
Note: Match held at the Pakhtakor Central Stadium in Tashkent, instead of Bunyodkor's regular Milliy Stadium in Tashkent. Match originally scheduled for 4 October 2020

| 20 November 2020 23 | Pakhtakor Tashkent | 2 – 1 | Kokand 1912 | Tashkent |
| 17:00 UZT (UTC+5) | Khamdamov 6'; Sayfiev (yellow card) 58'; Komilov (yellow card) 75'; Ćeran 81' | Report | Rajevac (yellow card) 60'; M.Holmuhammedov 85' (pen.) | Stadium: Central Stadium; Attendance: 256; Referee: Vadim Agishev |

| 25 November 2020 24 | Nasaf | 3 – 0 | Pakhtakor Tashkent | Qarshi |
| 13:00 UZT (UTC+5) | Mukhiddinov 6'; G.Gaibullaev (yellow card) 40'; Stanojević 56'; A.Mozgovoy 67' (yellow card) 70' | Report | Alijonov (yellow card) 40'; Ismoilov (yellow card) 72' | Stadium: Markaziy Stadium; Attendance: 1,454; Referee: Shavkat Nasibullaev |

| 29 November 2020 25 | Lokomotiv Tashkent | 0 – 1 | Pakhtakor Tashkent | Tashkent |
| 16:15 UZT (UTC+5) | | Report | Sergeev 38' | Stadium: Lokomotiv Stadium; Attendance: 5,798; Referee: Victor Serazitdinov |

| 3 December 2020 26 | Pakhtakor Tashkent | 2 – 0 | Andijon | Tashkent |
| 14:00 UZT (UTC+5) | Ćeran 32'; Sidikov 33'; Ismoilov (yellow card) 71'; Khamdamov (yellow card) 88' | Report | B.Qosimov (yellow card) 7'; U.Ismonaliev (yellow card) 66' | Stadium: Central Stadium; Attendance: 1,897; Referee: Zokir Kadyrov |

=== Uzbek Cup ===
| 8 December 2020 Last 16 | Pakhtakor Tashkent | 8 – 1 | Sogdiana | Tashkent |
| UZT (UTC+5) | Sergeev 2', 32'; Krimets (yellow card) 17'; Ismoilov 19'; Ćeran 28'; Khamdamov 53'; Derdiyok 57', 66'; Sidikov 72' | Report | S.Kulmatov (yellow card) 49'; Boltaboev 63' | Stadium: Central Stadium; Attendance: 271; Referee: Shavkat Nasibullaev |

| 12 December 2020 Quarterfinal | Pakhtakor Tashkent | 1 – 0 | Qizilqum | Tashkent |
| 13:00 UZT (UTC+5) | Sergeev (yellow card) 27' (goal) 33'; Sayfiev (yellow card) 29'; Masharipov (yellow card) 44'; Krimets (yellow card) 75' | Report | M.Ubaydullaev (yellow card) 22'; S.Juraev (yellow card) 26'; J.Azimov (yellow card) 44'; K.Nurmetov (yellow card) 67' | Stadium: Central Stadium; Attendance: 478; Referee: Ilgiz Tantashev |

| 16 December 2020 Semifinal | Kokand 1912 | 0 – 3 | Pakhtakor Tashkent | Kokand |
| 13:00 UZT (UTC+5) | S.Azimov (yellow card) 33'; M.Khasanov (yellow card) 69'; A.Mamatkhuzhaev (yellow card) 70'; M.Kholmukhammedov (yellow card) 76' | Report | Sergeev 31'; Sayfiev (yellow card) 45'; Kozak (yellow card) 57'; Khamdamov 74'; Derdiyok 90+4' | Stadium: Kokand Markaziy Stadium; Attendance: 2,378; Referee: Akhrol Riskullaev |

| 20 December 2020 Final | AGMK | 0 – 3 | Pakhtakor Tashkent | Namangan |
| 15:00 UZT (UTC+5) | S.Rakhmanov (yellow card) 58' | Report | Ćeran 28', 46'; Masharipov 59' (pen.) | Stadium: Markaziy Stadium; Attendance: 3,579; Referee: Zakir Kadyrov |

=== AFC Champions League ===
==== Group stages ====
| Pos | Team | Pld | W | D | L | GF | GA | GD | Pts | Qualification |
|---|---|---|---|---|---|---|---|---|---|---|
| 1 | (Uzbekistan) Pakhtakor | 4 | 3 | 1 | 0 | 6 | 1 | +5 | 10 | Advance to knockout stage |
| 2 | (United Arab Emirates) Shabab Al-Ahli | 4 | 2 | 1 | 1 | 3 | 2 | +1 | 7 | Advance to knockout stage |
| 3 | (Iran) Shahr Khodro | 4 | 0 | 0 | 4 | 0 | 6 | −6 | 0 | |
| 4 | (Saudi Arabia) Al-Hilal | 0 | 0 | 0 | 0 | 0 | 0 | 0 | 0 | Withdrew, results expunged (Note: Al-Hilal were unable to play their final match of the group stage against Shabab Al-Ahli due to having only 11 fit players after various team members tested positive for COVID-19. They were considered to have withdrawn from the competition, and their results were expunged.) |

Source: AFC
Notes:

| 10 February 2020 1 | Pakhtakor Tashkent (Uzbekistan) | 2 – 1 | (United Arab Emirates) Shabab Al-Ahli | Tashkent, Uzbekistan |
| 16:00 UZT (UTC+5) | Masharipov 18'; Sabirkhodjaev (yellow card) 56'; Hamrobekov (yellow card) 61'; Ćeran 70' | Report | Conde (yellow card) 42' (goal) 67' | Stadium: Central Stadium; Attendance: 10,476; Referee: Adham Makhadmeh (Jordan) |

| 17 February 2020 2 | Pakhtakor Tashkent (Uzbekistan) | 3 – 0 | (Iran) Shahr Khodro | Tashkent, Uzbekistan |
| 16:00 UZT (UTC+5) | Azamov (yellow card) 45' (goal) 87'; Sergeev 56', 59'; Ćeran (yellow card) 67'; Khamdamov (yellow card) 76' | Report | Moradmand (yellow card) 69' | Stadium: Central Stadium; Attendance: 19,420; Referee: Hettikamkanamge Perera (Sri Lanka) |

| 14 September 2020 3 | Al-Hilal (Saudi Arabia) | Voided; 2 – 1 | (Uzbekistan) Pakhtakor Tashkent | Al Wakrah, Qatar |
| 23:00 UZT (UTC+5) | Giovinco 45+2'; Bahebri 90+7'; Al-Shahrani (yellow card) | Report | Derdiyok 70'; Komilov (yellow card); An.Ismailov (yellow card); Ćeran (yellow card); Suyunov (red card) | Stadium: Al Janoub Stadium; Attendance: 0 Referee: Ko Hyung-jin (South Korea) |

| 17 September 2020 4 | Pakhtakor Tashkent | Voided; 0 – 0 | (Saudi Arabia) Al-Hilal | Al Wakrah, Qatar |
| 23:00 UZT (UTC+5) | An.Ismailov (yellow card) | Report | Kanno (yellow card) | Stadium: Al Janoub Stadium; Attendance: 0 Referee: Nawaf Shukralla (Bahrain) |

| 20 September 2020 5 | Shabab Al-Ahli (United Arab Emirates) | 0 – 0 | (Uzbekistan) Pakhtakor Tashkent | Al Wakrah, Qatar |
| 23:00 UZT (UTC+5) | Abbas (yellow card) 46'; Haikal (yellow card) 49'; Carlos Eduardo (yellow card) 78' | Report | Sabirkhodjaev (yellow card) 7'; Ismoilov (yellow card) 85' | Stadium: Al Janoub Stadium; Attendance: 0 Referee: Muhammad Taqi (Singapore) |

| 23 September 2020 6 | Shahr Khodro (Iran) | 0 – 1 | Pakhtakor Tashkent | Al Wakrah, Qatar |
| 23:00 UZT (UTC+5) | Taheran (yellow card) 31'; Khalatbari (yellow card) 45'; Nemati (yellow card) 45+3'; Sadeghi (yellow card) 69'; Jafari (yellow card) 76' | Report | Masharipov 65'; Komilov (yellow card) 73' | Stadium: Al Janoub Stadium; Attendance: 0 Referee: Hanna Hattab (Syria) |

==== Knockout stages ====
| 26 September 2020 Last 16 | Pakhtakor Tashkent (Uzbekistan) | 2 – 1 | (Iran) Esteghlal | Al Wakrah, Qatar |
| 22:45 UZT (UTC+5) | Krimets (yellow card) 5'; Ćeran 43'; Derdiyok 47'; Suyunov (yellow card) 84' | Report | Motahari (yellow card) 4'; Karimi 32'; Daneshgar (yellow card) 74'; Rezavand (yellow card) 77'; Zakipour (yellow card) 87'; Ghayedi (yellow card) 90+1' | Stadium: Al Janoub Stadium; Attendance: 0 Referee: Ahmed Al-Kaf (Oman) |

| 30 September 2020 Quarterfinal | Persepolis (Iran) | 2 – 0 | (Uzbekistan) Pakhtakor Tashkent | Doha, Qatar |
| 22:45 UZT (UTC+5) | Alekasir 49', 66' | Report | Masharipov (red card) 15' | Stadium: Jassim Bin Hamad Stadium; Attendance: 0 Referee: Adham Makhadmeh (Jordan) |

== Squad statistics ==
As of match played 20 December 2020

=== Appearances and goals ===
| No. | Pos | Nat | Player | Total | | Uzbek Super League | | Uzbek Cup | | AFC Champions League | |
| No. | Pos | Nat | Player | Apps | Goals | Apps | Goals | Apps | Goals | Apps | Goals |
|---|---|---|---|---|---|---|---|---|---|---|---|
| 3 | DF | (Uzbekistan) UZB | Khojiakbar Alijonov | 35 | 0 | 22+1 | 0 | 4 | 0 | 8 | 0 |
| 4 | DF | (Uzbekistan) UZB | Akramjon Komilov | 23 | 2 | 7+9 | 2 | 1+2 | 0 | 0+4 | 0 |
| 5 | DF | (Uzbekistan) UZB | Anzur Ismailov | 32 | 0 | 19+4 | 0 | 2+1 | 0 | 5+1 | 0 |
| 6 | DF | (Uzbekistan) UZB | Alisher Salimov | 3 | 0 | 0+3 | 0 | 0 | 0 | 0 | 0 |
| 7 | MF | (Uzbekistan) UZB | Sadriddin Abdullaev | 10 | 0 | 0+8 | 0 | 0 | 0 | 0+2 | 0 |
| 8 | MF | (Uzbekistan) UZB | Asadbek Sobirjonov | 14 | 1 | 2+10 | 1 | 0 | 0 | 0+2 | 0 |
| 9 | MF | (Uzbekistan) UZB | Jaloliddin Masharipov | 35 | 9 | 23 | 6 | 4 | 1 | 8 | 2 |
| 10 | FW | (Serbia) SRB | Dragan Ćeran | 37 | 26 | 26 | 21 | 4 | 3 | 7 | 2 |
| 11 | FW | (Uzbekistan) UZB | Igor Sergeev | 35 | 22 | 16+8 | 16 | 3 | 4 | 5+3 | 2 |
| 15 | DF | (Uzbekistan) UZB | Egor Krimets | 32 | 0 | 21 | 0 | 3 | 0 | 8 | 0 |
| 17 | MF | (Uzbekistan) UZB | Dostonbek Khamdamov | 38 | 11 | 22+4 | 9 | 4 | 2 | 8 | 0 |
| 18 | MF | (Uzbekistan) UZB | Khojimat Erkinov | 12 | 0 | 0+8 | 0 | 0+4 | 0 | 0 | 0 |
| 20 | MF | (Uzbekistan) UZB | Odiljon Hamrobekov | 33 | 0 | 21 | 0 | 3+1 | 0 | 8 | 0 |
| 21 | MF | (Uzbekistan) UZB | Abror Ismoilov | 30 | 3 | 10+10 | 2 | 3+1 | 1 | 2+4 | 0 |
| 25 | GK | (Uzbekistan) UZB | Eldorbek Suyunov | 28 | 0 | 21 | 0 | 0 | 0 | 7 | 0 |
| 23 | DF | (Uzbekistan) UZB | Sherzod Azamov | 23 | 1 | 10+6 | 0 | 2 | 0 | 3+2 | 1 |
| 27 | MF | (Uzbekistan) UZB | Sardor Sabirkhodjaev | 35 | 3 | 21+3 | 2 | 2+2 | 0 | 7 | 1 |
| 28 | MF | (Uzbekistan) UZB | Diyor Kholmatov | 3 | 1 | 0+3 | 1 | 0 | 0 | 0 | 0 |
| 29 | MF | (Uzbekistan) UZB | Vladimir Kozak | 11 | 0 | 2+4 | 0 | 1+1 | 0 | 0+3 | 0 |
| 34 | DF | (Uzbekistan) UZB | Farrukh Sayfiev | 35 | 1 | 23+1 | 1 | 3 | 0 | 8 | 0 |
| 35 | GK | (Uzbekistan) UZB | Sanjar Kuvvatov | 11 | 0 | 5 | 0 | 4 | 0 | 1+1 | 0 |
| 76 | FW | (Uzbekistan) UZB | Ulugbek Khoshimov | 1 | 0 | 0+1 | 0 | 0 | 0 | 0 | 0 |
| 77 | FW | (Switzerland) SUI | Eren Derdiyok | 33 | 14 | 10+12 | 9 | 1+3 | 3 | 3+4 | 2 |
| 88 | DF | (Uzbekistan) UZB | Shahzod Azmiddinov | 1 | 0 | 0+1 | 0 | 0 | 0 | 0 | 0 |
| 99 | MF | (Uzbekistan) UZB | Javokhir Sidikov | 21 | 4 | 5+9 | 3 | 0+3 | 1 | 0+4 | 0 |
Players away on loan:
| 14 | MF | (Uzbekistan) UZB | Khumoyunmirzo Iminov | 3 | 0 | 0+2 | 0 | 0 | 0 | 0+1 | 0 |
Players who left Pakhtakor Tashkent during the season:

=== Goal scorers ===
| Place | Position | Nation | Number | Name | Uzbek Super League | Uzbekistan Cup | AFC Champions League | Total |
|---|---|---|---|---|---|---|---|---|
| 1 | FW | (Serbia) | 10 | Dragan Ćeran | 21 | 3 | 2 | 26 |
| 2 | FW | (Uzbekistan) | 11 | Igor Sergeev | 16 | 4 | 2 | 22 |
| 3 | FW | (Switzerland) | 77 | Eren Derdiyok | 9 | 3 | 1 | 13 |
| 4 | MF | (Uzbekistan) | 17 | Dostonbek Khamdamov | 9 | 2 | 0 | 11 |
| 5 | MF | (Uzbekistan) | 9 | Jaloliddin Masharipov | 6 | 1 | 2 | 9 |
| 6 | MF | (Uzbekistan) | 99 | Javokhir Sidikov | 3 | 1 | 0 | 4 |
| 7 | MF | (Uzbekistan) | 21 | Abror Ismoilov | 2 | 1 | 0 | 3 |
| 7 | | | | Own goal | 3 | 0 | 0 | 3 |
| 9 | DF | (Uzbekistan) | 4 | Akramjon Komilov | 2 | 0 | 0 | 2 |
| 9 | MF | (Uzbekistan) | 27 | Sardor Sabirkhodjaev | 2 | 0 | 0 | 2 |
| 11 | DF | (Uzbekistan) | 34 | Farrukh Sayfiev | 1 | 0 | 0 | 1 |
| 11 | MF | (Uzbekistan) | 8 | Asadbek Sobirjonov | 1 | 0 | 0 | 1 |
| 11 | MF | (Uzbekistan) | 28 | Diyor Kholmatov | 1 | 0 | 0 | 1 |
| | | | | TOTALS | 76 | 15 | 8 | 99 |

=== Clean sheets ===
| Place | Position | Nation | Number | Name | Uzbek Super League | Uzbekistan Cup | AFC Champions League | Total |
|---|---|---|---|---|---|---|---|---|
| 1 | GK | (Uzbekistan) | 25 | Eldorbek Suyunov | 10 | 3 | 0 | 13 |
| 2 | GK | (Uzbekistan) | 35 | Sanjar Kuvvatov | 3 | 3 | 0 | 6 |
| | | | | TOTALS | 13 | 3 | 3 | 19 |

=== Disciplinary record ===
| Number | Nation | Position | Name | Uzbek Super League | | Uzbekistan Cup | | AFC Champions League | | Total | |
| Number | Nation | Position | Name | Yellow card | Red card | Yellow card | Red card | Yellow card | Red card | Yellow card | Red card |
| 3 | (Uzbekistan) | DF | Khojiakbar Alijonov | 6 | 1 | 0 | 0 | 0 | 0 | 6 | 1 |
| 4 | (Uzbekistan) | DF | Akramjon Komilov | 1 | 0 | 0 | 0 | 1 | 0 | 2 | 0 |
| 5 | (Uzbekistan) | DF | Anzur Ismailov | 2 | 0 | 0 | 0 | 0 | 0 | 2 | 0 |
| 9 | (Uzbekistan) | MF | Jaloliddin Masharipov | 1 | 1 | 1 | 0 | 0 | 1 | 2 | 2 |
| 10 | (Serbia) | FW | Dragan Ćeran | 1 | 0 | 0 | 0 | 1 | 0 | 2 | 0 |
| 11 | (Uzbekistan) | FW | Igor Sergeev | 0 | 0 | 1 | 0 | 0 | 0 | 1 | 0 |
| 15 | (Uzbekistan) | DF | Egor Krimets | 7 | 1 | 2 | 0 | 1 | 0 | 10 | 1 |
| 17 | (Uzbekistan) | MF | Dostonbek Khamdamov | 2 | 0 | 0 | 0 | 1 | 0 | 3 | 0 |
| 20 | (Uzbekistan) | MF | Odiljon Hamrobekov | 3 | 0 | 0 | 0 | 1 | 0 | 4 | 0 |
| 21 | (Uzbekistan) | MF | Abror Ismoilov | 6 | 0 | 0 | 0 | 1 | 0 | 7 | 0 |
| 23 | (Uzbekistan) | DF | Sherzod Azamov | 1 | 0 | 0 | 0 | 1 | 0 | 2 | 0 |
| 25 | (Uzbekistan) | GK | Eldorbek Suyunov | 0 | 0 | 0 | 0 | 1 | 0 | 1 | 0 |
| 27 | (Uzbekistan) | MF | Sardor Sabirkhodjaev | 1 | 0 | 0 | 0 | 2 | 0 | 3 | 0 |
| 29 | (Uzbekistan) | DF | Vladimir Kozak | 1 | 0 | 1 | 0 | 0 | 0 | 2 | 0 |
| 34 | (Uzbekistan) | DF | Farrukh Sayfiev | 2 | 0 | 2 | 0 | 0 | 0 | 4 | 0 |
| 35 | (Uzbekistan) | GK | Sanjar Kuvvatov | 1 | 0 | 0 | 0 | 0 | 0 | 1 | 0 |
| 77 | (Switzerland) | FW | Eren Derdiyok | 1 | 0 | 0 | 0 | 0 | 0 | 1 | 0 |
| 99 | (Uzbekistan) | MF | Javokhir Sidikov | 1 | 0 | 0 | 0 | 0 | 0 | 1 | 0 |
Players who left Pakhtakor Tashkent during the season:
| | | | TOTALS | 37 | 3 | 7 | 0 | 10 | 1 | 54 | 4 |
