= 2022 Uzbekistan Super Cup =

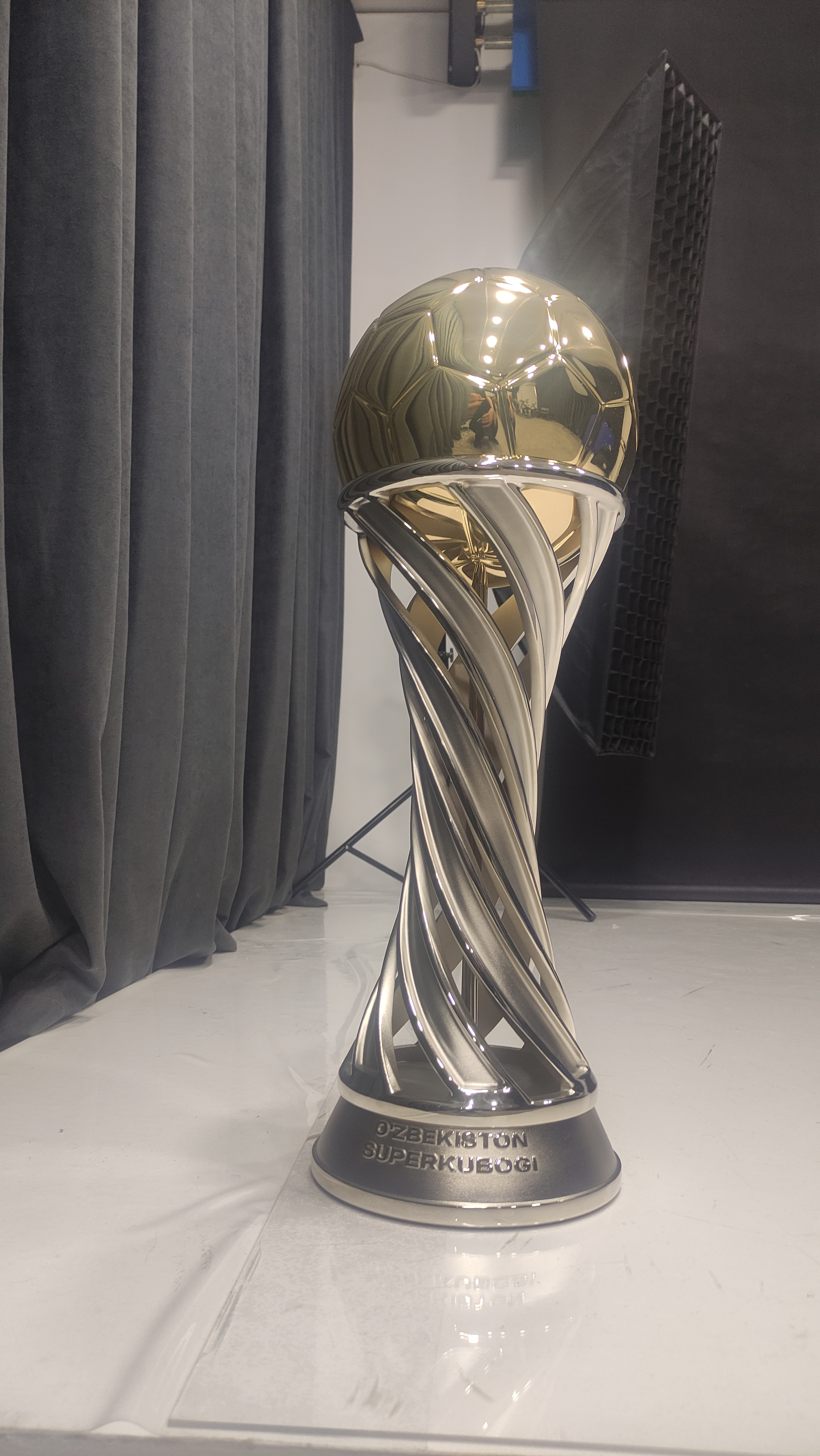
Pakhtakor Tashkent	Nasaf
1	0
- Date: 27 February 2022
- Venue: Uzbekistan, Yaypan
- Referee: Akobir Shukrullaev
- Attendance: 7,200

The 2022 Uzbekistan Super Cup was the 7th Uzbekistan Super Cup, an annual football match played between the winners of the previous season's Super League and Cup. As Pakhtakor Tashkent completed a domestic League and Cup Double, second placed Super League Nasaf also took part in the match. Pakhtakor Tashkent won the match 1–0, retaining the Super Cup title they'd won the previous year, also against Nasaf with the same score.

== Match details ==
27 February 2022
16:00 UZT (UTC+5)

Pakhtakor Tashkent	1 – 0	Nasaf
Ćeran 61'	Report

Pakhtakor Central Stadium, Tashkent
Attendance: 7,200
Referee: Akobir Shukrullaev

Pakhtakor Tashkent	Nasaf

GK	33	(Uzbekistan) Eldorbek Suyunov		(substituted off) 45+1'
DF	3	(Uzbekistan) Khojiakbar Alijonov
DF	5	(Ukraine) Oleksiy Larin
DF	6	(Uzbekistan) Ikromjon Alibaev	(yellow card) 53'
DF	21	(Bulgaria) Kamen Hadzhiev
DF	34	(Uzbekistan) Farrukh Sayfiev	(yellow card) 13'
MF	7	(Uzbekistan) Odiljon Hamrobekov	(yellow card) 86'
MF	8	(Uzbekistan) Azizbek Turgunboev	(yellow card) 49'	(substituted off) 90+3'
MF	27	(Uzbekistan) Sardor Sabirkhodjaev		(substituted off) 81'
FW	10	(Serbia) Dragan Ćeran	(yellow card) 84'
FW	11	(Uzbekistan) Sardor Rashidov		(substituted off) 81'
Substitutes:
GK	35	(Uzbekistan) Sanjar Kuvvatov	(yellow card) 76'	(substituted on) 45+1'
FW	14	(Montenegro) Oliver Sarkic		(substituted on) 81'
MF	16	(Uzbekistan) Ruslan Roziev
MF	18	(Uzbekistan) Khojimat Erkinov		(substituted on) 81'
MF	28	(Uzbekistan) Diyor Kholmatov
DF	29	(Uzbekistan) Zhasur Yakubov		(substituted on) 90+3'
FW	36	(Uzbekistan) Abbos Ergashboev
MF	46	(Uzbekistan) Abbosbek Fayzullaev
FW	77	(Uzbekistan) Mirjakhon Mirakhmadov
Manager:
(North Macedonia) Slavče Vojneski

GK	1	(Uzbekistan) Umidjon Ergashev
DF	5	(Uzbekistan) Golib Gaybullaev
DF	34	(Uzbekistan) Sherzod Nasrullaev
DF	92	(Uzbekistan) Umar Eshmurodov
MF	7	(Uzbekistan) Sharof Mukhiddinov
MF	8	(Uzbekistan) Dilshod Saitov
MF	20	(Uzbekistan) Akmal Mozgovoy
MF	88	(Serbia) Marko Stanojević	(yellow card) 19'	(substituted off) 80'
FW	9	(Russia) Ivan Solovyov		(substituted off) 80'
FW	10	(Uzbekistan) Khusayin Norchaev
FW	17	(Uzbekistan) Sukhrob Nurullaev		(substituted off) 87'
Substitutes:
GK	13	(Uzbekistan) Azamat Soyibov
GK	35	(Uzbekistan) Abduvohid Nematov
DF	2	(Uzbekistan) Alibek Davronov
DF	4	(Uzbekistan) Husniddin Aliqulov		(substituted on) 87'
MF	6	(Uzbekistan) Murodbek Rakhmatov
MF	18	(Uzbekistan) Bakhrom Abdurakhimov		(substituted on) 80'
DF	23	(Uzbekistan) Sardor Sadulloev
MF	30	(Uzbekistan) Aziz Xolmurodov	(yellow card) 90+4'	(substituted on) 80'
FW	55	(Uzbekistan) Shakhzod Akramov
Manager:
(Uzbekistan) Ruziqul Berdiyev

== See also ==
- 2021 Uzbekistan Super League
- 2021 Uzbekistan Cup
