= Abbosbek Fayzullaev =

Uzbek footballer (born 2003)

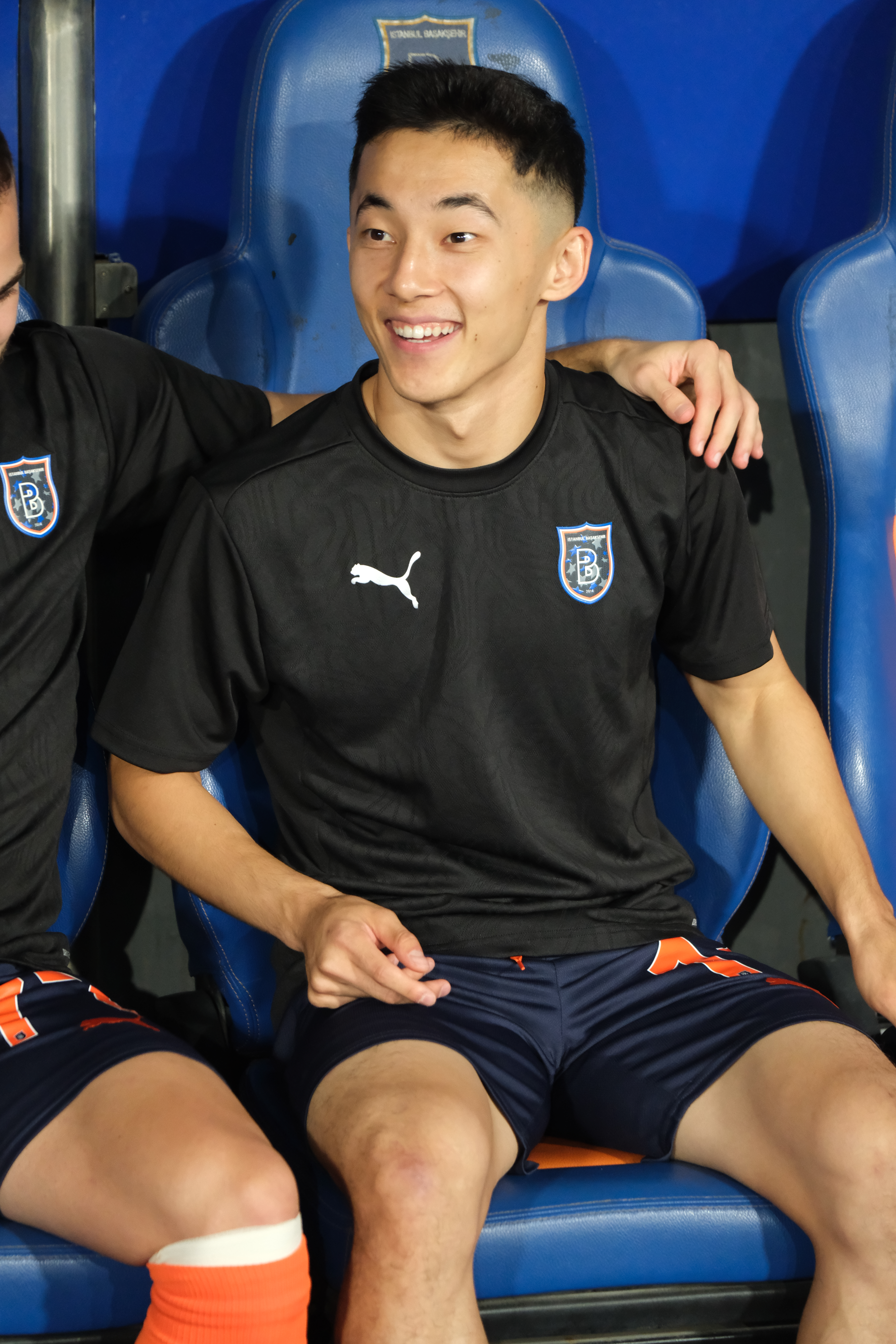
- Fayzullaev with İstanbul Başakşehir in 2025

Personal information
- Full name: Abbosbek Sayidjon oʻgʻli Fayzullayev
- Date of birth: 3 October 2003 (age 23)
- Place of birth: Sayxunobod, Sirdaryo Region, Uzbekistan
- Height: 1.67 m (5 ft 6 in)
- Positions: Attacking midfielder; winger

Team information
- Current team: İstanbul Başakşehir
- Number: 11

Youth career
- Pakhtakor-2

Senior career*
Years	Team	Apps	(Gls)
2021–2023	Pakhtakor	33	(7)
2023–2025	CSKA Moscow	49	(6)
2025–	İstanbul Başakşehir	28	(4)

International career^{‡}
- Uzbekistan U19
2022–2023	Uzbekistan U20	6	(1)
2021–2024	Uzbekistan Olympic	12	(9)
2023–	Uzbekistan	35	(9)
Medal record
Men's football
Representing Uzbekistan
CAFA Nations Cup
Runner-up	2023 Kyrgyzstan–Uzbekistan	Team
Winner	2025 Tajikistan–Uzbekistan	Team
AFC U-20 Asian Cup
Winner	2023 Uzbekistan	Team
AFC U-23 Asian Cup
Runner-up	2022 Uzbekistan	Team
Runner-up	2024 Qatar	Team
- * Club domestic league appearances and goals as of 1 November 2026 ‡ National team caps and goals as of 28 June 2026

Abbosbek Saidzhon ugli Fayzullaev (Uzbek: Abbosbek Sayidjon oʻgʻli Fayzullayev; born 3 October 2003) is an Uzbek professional footballer who plays as an attacking midfielder or winger for Süper Lig club İstanbul Başakşehir and the Uzbekistan national team.

== Club career ==
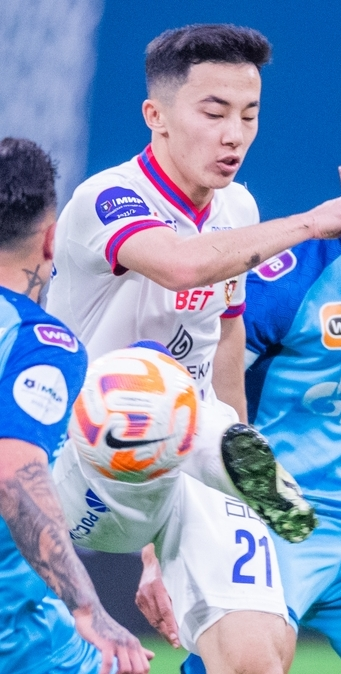
Fayzullaev with CSKA Moscow in 2024

On 6 May 2021, he made his debut in the Uzbekistan Super League against Turon. On 29 June 2022, he scored his first goal for Pakhtakor in a game against Bunyodkor.

On 4 August 2023, CSKA Moscow announced the signing of Fayzullaev to a three-year contract from Pakhtakor. On August 19, he made his debut for his new club in a match against Dynamo Moscow (1–2), coming on as a substitute in the 87th minute. On September 24, he scored his first goal for CSKA in a 3:3 match against Rostov.

In December 2023, he was nominated for the IFFHS award for the Best Young Player of the Year.

On 26 May 2024, Fayzullaev received the Breakthrough of the Season award in the 2023–24 Russian Premier League.

On 29 October 2024, he was named the AFC Youth Player of the Year for 2023.

On 30 July 2025, Fayzullaev signed a five-year contract with İstanbul Başakşehir in Turkey.

== International career ==
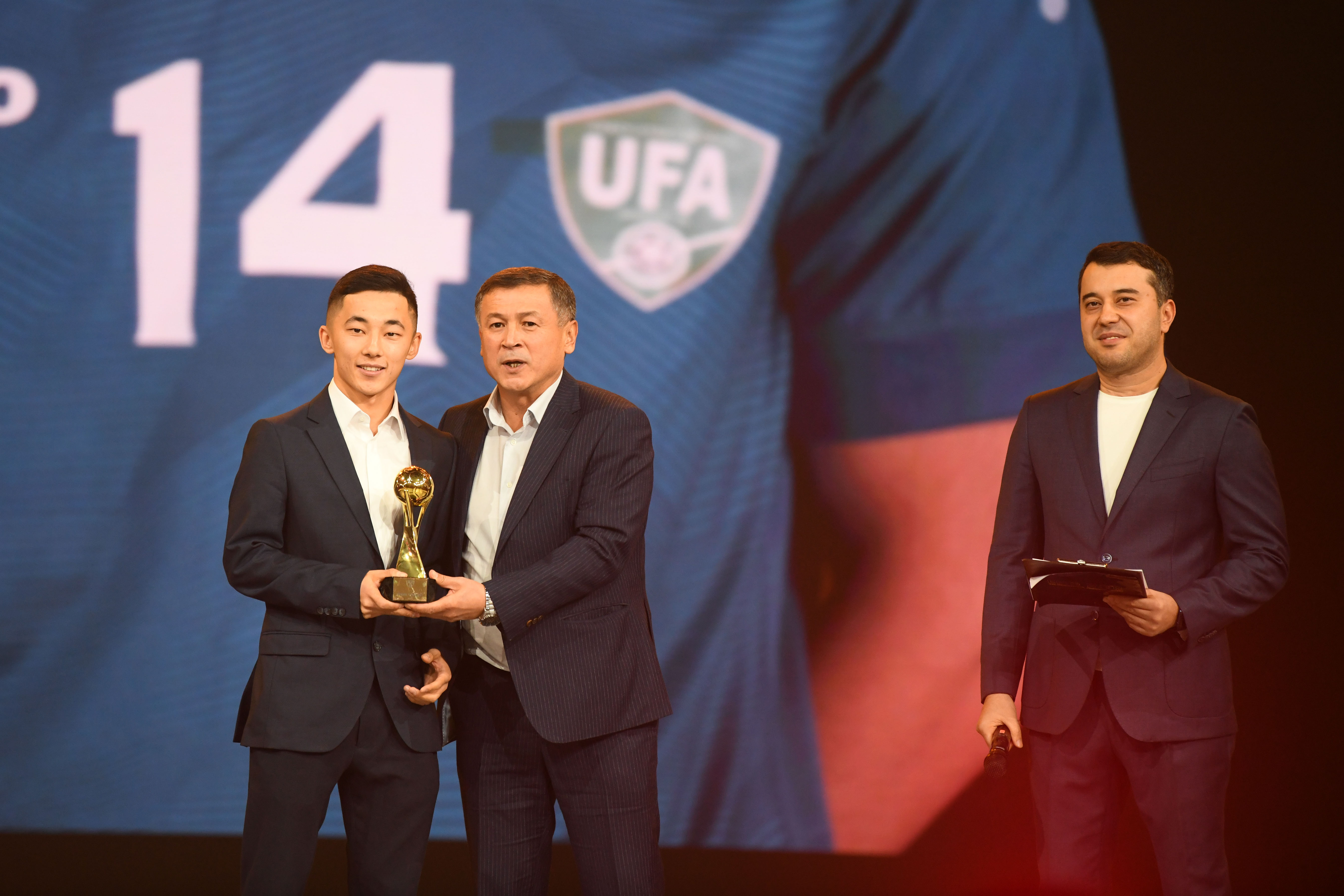
Abbosbek Fayzullaev, Mirjalol Kasymov and Davron Fayziev

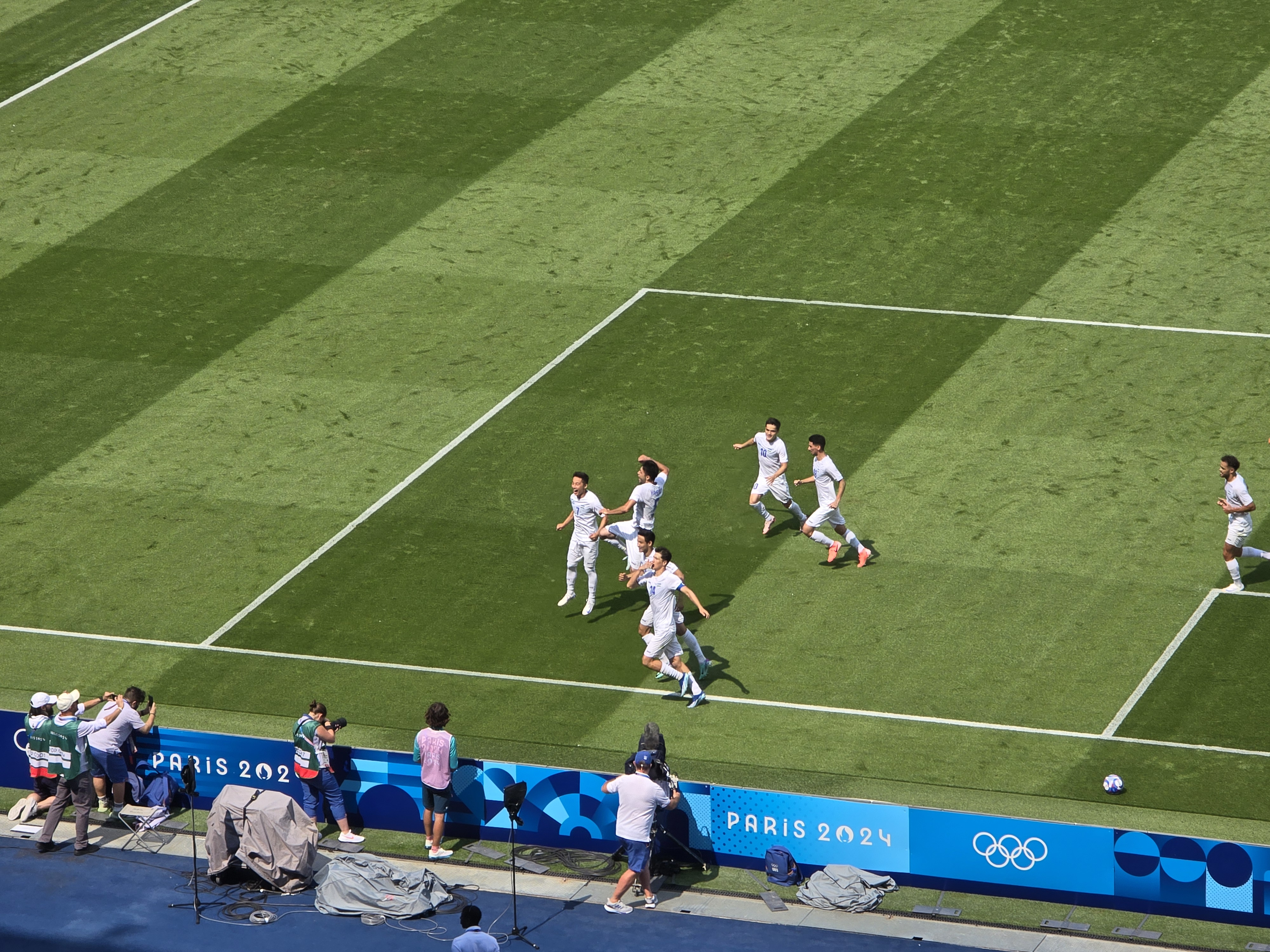
Abbosbek Fayzullaev scored goal. Uzbekistan vs. Spain, 2024 Summer Olympic men's association football, Parc des Princes (Paris).

Fayzullaev was called up to the Uzbekistan under-19 squad while still in the academy of Pakhtakor Tashkent. He was called up to the nation's under-23 squad in October 2021, for 2022 AFC U-23 Asian Cup qualification, and marked his debut with a goal against Bangladesh. For his performances at the 2022 AFC U-23 Asian Cup, in which Uzbekistan were beaten in the final by Saudi Arabia, Fayzullaev won the Uzbekistan FA's Young Star of the Year award.

He was called up to the under-20 side for the 2023 AFC U-20 Asian Cup, and went on to star in the competition. In the final against Iraq, he won the penalty which sealed the 1–0 victory for his side, as teammate Umarali Rahmonaliyev converted from the spot, giving Uzbekistan their first ever Under-20 Asian Cup title. For his performances, he was named the tournament's Most Valuable Player.

On 11 June 2023, he debuted for the senior national team in a match against Oman, which ended in a 3–0 victory. On June 17, in a match against Tajikistan, he scored his first goal for the national team, contributing to a 5–1 victory. On 4 January 2024, he was included in the final squad for the 2023 AFC Asian Cup. During the tournament, he played in five matches and scored two goals, against the India and Thailand teams.

In 2024, he participated in the 2024 Summer Olympics in Paris as part of Uzbekistan's Olympic football team. He played in the match against Spain.

On 14 November 2024, during a 2026 World Cup qualification match against Qatar, he scored a brace, marking his first double for the national team in a match that ended 3–2.

On 2 June 2026, he was included in the 26-man squad selected by head coach Fabio Cannavaro for the 2026 FIFA World Cup in the country's first-ever appearance in the tournament. On 17 June, in their opener against Colombia, he scored the country's first ever goal in a World Cup finals in a 1–3 defeat.

== Career statistics ==
=== Club ===
As of 18 June 2026

Appearances and goals by club, season and competition
Club	Season	League			National cup (Note: Includes Uzbekistan Cup, Russian Cup, Turkish Cup)		Continental		Other		Total	
Club	Season	Division	Apps	Goals	Apps	Goals	Apps	Goals	Apps	Goals	Apps	Goals
Pakhtakor Tashkent	2021	Uzbekistan Super League	6	0	1	0	2 (Note: Appearances in AFC Champions League)	0	—		9	0
Pakhtakor Tashkent	2022	Uzbekistan Super League	21	5	2	2	3	1	—		26	8
Pakhtakor Tashkent	2023	Uzbekistan Super League	6	2	0	0	0	0	—		6	2
Pakhtakor Tashkent	Total		33	7	3	2	5	1	—		41	10
CSKA Moscow	2023–24	Russian Premier League	22	4	10	1	—		—		32	5
CSKA Moscow	2024–25	Russian Premier League	27	2	12	1	—		—		39	3
CSKA Moscow	2025–26	Russian Premier League	0	0	0	0	—		1 (Note: Appearance in Russian Super Cup)	0	1	0
CSKA Moscow	Total		49	6	22	2	—		1	0	72	8
İstanbul Başakşehir	2025–26	Süper Lig	20	3	4	1	2 (Note: Appearances in UEFA Conference League)	0	0	0	26	4
Career total			102	16	29	5	7	1	1	0	139	22

=== International ===
As of match played 27 June 2026

Appearances and goals by national team and year
National team	Year	Apps	Goals
Uzbekistan	2023	8	2
Uzbekistan	2024	15	5
Uzbekistan	2025	7	1
Uzbekistan	2026	5	1
Total		35	9

Scores and results list Uzbekistan's goal tally first, score column indicates score after each Uzbekistan goal.

List of international goals scored by Fayzullaev
No.	Date	Venue	Opponent	Score	Result	Competition
1	17 June 2023	Milliy Stadium, Tashkent, Uzbekistan	Tajikistan	4–1	5–1	2023 CAFA Nations Cup
2	25 December 2023	Al Maktoum Stadium, Dubai, United Arab Emirates	Kyrgyzstan	1–0	4–1	Friendly
3	18 January 2024	Ahmad bin Ali Stadium, Al Rayyan, Qatar	India	1–0	3–0	2023 AFC Asian Cup
4	30 January 2024	Al Janoub Stadium, Al Wakrah, Qatar	Thailand	2–1	2–1	2023 AFC Asian Cup
5	14 November 2024	Jassim bin Hamad Stadium, Doha, Qatar	Qatar	1–2	2–3	2026 FIFA World Cup qualification
6	14 November 2024	Jassim bin Hamad Stadium, Doha, Qatar	Qatar	2–2	2–3	2026 FIFA World Cup qualification
7	19 November 2024	New Laos National Stadium, Vientiane, Laos	North Korea	1–0	1–0	2026 FIFA World Cup qualification
8	25 March 2025	Azadi Stadium, Tehran, Iran	Iran	2–1	2–2	2026 FIFA World Cup qualification
9	17 June 2026	Estadio Azteca, Mexico City, Mexico	Colombia	1–1	1–3	2026 FIFA World Cup

== Personal life ==
He is married.

== Honours ==
Pakhtakor Tashkent

- Uzbekistan Super League: 2021, 2022, 2023
- Uzbekistan Super Cup: 2022

CSKA Moscow

- Russian Cup: 2024–25
- Russian Super Cup: 2025

Uzbekistan U20

- AFC U-20 Asian Cup: 2023

Individual

- AFC U-20 Asian Cup MVP: 2023
- Uzbekistan Player of the Year: 2023, 2024
- AFC Asian Cup Team of the Tournament: 2023
- Russian Premier League discovery of the season: 2023–24
- AFC Youth Player of the Year: 2023
