= Jaloliddin Masharipov =

Uzbek professional football player

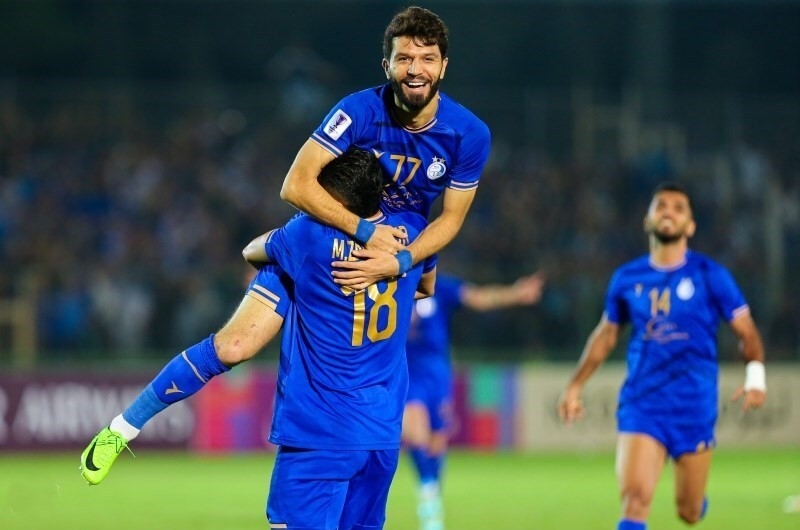
- Masharipov with Esteghlal in 2024-25 AFC Champions League Elite

Personal information
- Full name: Jaloliddin Qadomboy o‘g‘li Masharipov
- Date of birth: 1 September 1993 (age 33)
- Place of birth: Urgench, Uzbekistan
- Height: 1.74 m (5 ft 9 in)
- Position: Winger

Team information
- Current team: Esteghlal
- Number: 10

Senior career*
Years	Team	Apps	(Gls)
2013–2020	Pakhtakor	141	(24)
2017	→ Lokomotiv Tashkent (loan)	27	(6)
2021–2023	Al Nassr	40	(2)
2021	→ Shabab Al-Ahli (loan)	12	(2)
2023–2024	Panserraikos	7	(0)
2024–	Esteghlal	45	(3)

International career^{‡}
2013	Uzbekistan U20	9	(0)
2018	Uzbekistan U23	12	(3)
2016–	Uzbekistan	74	(12)
Medal record
Representing Uzbekistan
CAFA Nations Cup
Runner-up	2023 Kyrgyzstan–Uzbekistan	Team
- * Club domestic league appearances and goals as of 7 November 2026 ‡ National team caps and goals as of 10 June 2025

Jaloliddin Qadomboy oʻgʻli Masharipov (born 1 September 1993) is an Uzbek professional footballer who plays as a winger for Persian Gulf Pro League club Esteghlal, and the Uzbekistan national team.

== Club career ==
In July 2020, it was reported that he was linked to Süper Lig team Trabzonspor. He later played a key role in Pakhtakor's 2020 season, scoring nine goals and had 22 assists in 35 appearances in all competitions. However, his early exit after receiving a red card had a major role in his team's loss against Persepolis in the 2020 AFC Champions League quarter-finals.

On 26 December 2020, he signed for Saudi club Al Nassr. Next month, Masharipov was sent on loan to Emirati club Shabab Al-Ahli.

After returning from his loan spell, he wore the number 7 jersey for Al Nassr. In January 2023, when Cristiano Ronaldo signed for the Saudi club, Masharipov changed to number 77, allowing the Portuguese star to wear his iconic number 7.

On 17 August 2023, Al Nassr announced that Masharipov's contract had been terminated by mutual agreement.

On 27 September 2023, Masharipov signed a one-year deal with Super League Greece club Panserraikos. On 31 January 2024, Panserraikos announced the departure of Masharipov.

== International career ==
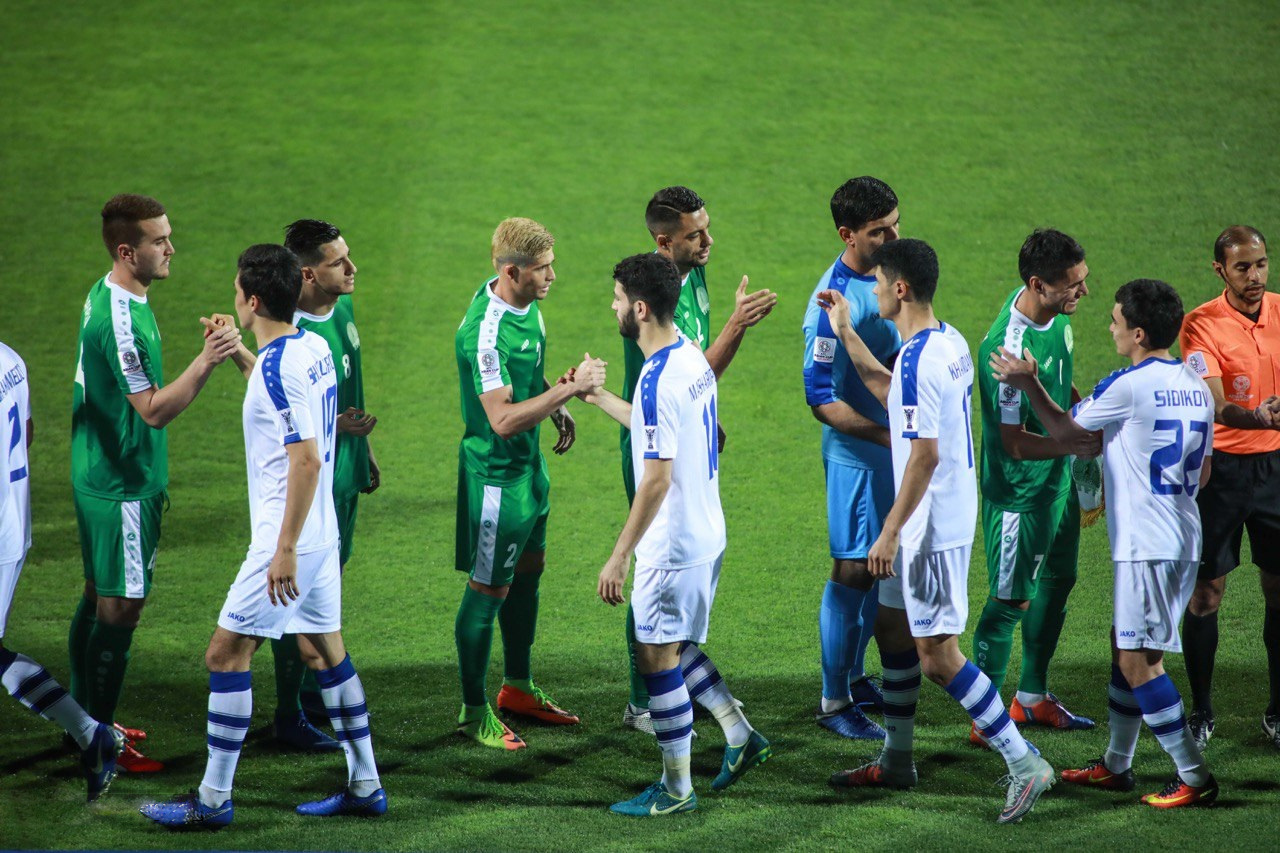
Jaloliddin Masharipov handshake with Zafar Babajanow before the match Turkmenistan vs. Uzbekistan at the 2019 AFC Asian Cup.

Masharipov played for Uzbekistan U-20 since 2013. He was also called up in 2015 for the King's Cup in Thailand, but he received a red card in the first half after launching a flying, studs-up kick into the chest of South Korea's Kang Sang-woo. Later he was also called up for senior team and Masharipov made his first appearance in national team on 6 October 2016, replacing Sardor Rashidov as substitute in the 61st minute, in a 0–1 loss 2018 World Cup qualifier game against Iran.

On 2 June 2026, he was included in the 26-man squad selected by head coach Fabio Cannavaro for the 2026 FIFA World Cup, marking the country's first-ever appearance in the tournament. Due to an intervertebral hernia, Masharipov was deemed unable to participate in the World Cup and replaced in the Uzbek squad by Ruslanbek Jiyanov a day before the team's opening fixture against Colombia on 17 June.

== Career statistics ==
=== Club ===
As of match played 7 November 2026

Appearances and goals by club, season and competition
Club	Season	League			National cup (Note: Includes Uzbekistan Cup, UAE President's Cup, King Cup, Hazfi Cup)		League cup (Note: Includes Uzbekistan League Cup, UAE League Cup)		Continental		Other		Total	
Club	Season	Division	Apps	Goals	Apps	Goals	Apps	Goals	Apps	Goals	Apps	Goals	Apps	Goals
Pakhtakor Tashkent	2013	Uzbek League	0	0	1	0	0	0	0	0	—		1	0
Pakhtakor Tashkent	2014	Uzbek League	12	0	5	1	0	0	—		—		17	1
Pakhtakor Tashkent	2015	Uzbek League	22	3	6	0	0	0	6 (Note: Appearance(s) in AFC Champions League)	0	1 (Note: Appearance in Uzbekistan Super Cup)	0	35	3
Pakhtakor Tashkent	2016	Uzbek League	30	7	2	0	—		6	1	1	0	39	8
Pakhtakor Tashkent	2018	Uzbekistan Super League	29	4	4	1	—		1	0	—		34	5
Pakhtakor Tashkent	2019	Uzbekistan Super League	25	4	4	2	4	2	8	1	—		41	9
Pakhtakor Tashkent	2020	Uzbekistan Super League	23	6	4	1	—		8	2	—		35	9
Pakhtakor Tashkent	Total		141	24	26	5	4	2	29	4	2	0	202	35
Lokomotiv Tashkent (loan)	2017	Uzbek League	27	6	6	2	—		6	1	—		39	9
Al Nassr	2021–22	Saudi Pro League	26	2	0	0	—		3	2	—		29	4
Al Nassr	2022–23	Saudi Pro League	14	0	1	0	—		—		1 (Note: Appearance in Saudi Super Cup)	0	16	0
Al Nassr	Total		40	2	1	0	—		3	2	1	0	45	4
Shabab Al-Ahli (loan)	2020–21	UAE Pro League	12	2	2	0	3	0	4	0	—		21	2
Panserraikos	2023–24	Super League Greece	7	0	1	0	—		—		—		8	0
Esteghlal	2023–24	Pro League	14	2	1	0	—		—		—		15	2
Esteghlal	2024–25	Pro League	24	1	2	0	—		8	0	—		34	1
Esteghlal	2025–26	Pro League	1	0	1	0	—		0	0	0	0	2	0
Esteghlal	2026–27	Pro League	6	0	0	0	—		4	0	0	0	10	0
Esteghlal	Total		45	3	4	0	—		12	0	0	0	61	3
Career total			272	37	40	7	7	2	54	7	3	0	376	53

=== International ===
As of match played 10 June 2025.

National team	Year	Apps	Goals
Uzbekistan
Uzbekistan	2016	4	0
Uzbekistan	2017	6	0
Uzbekistan	2018	4	0
Uzbekistan	2019	14	1
Uzbekistan	2020	4	0
Uzbekistan	2021	7	3
Uzbekistan	2022	6	4
Uzbekistan	2023	11	3
Uzbekistan	2024	15	1
Uzbekistan	2025	3	0
Total		74	12

=== International goals ===
Scores and results list Uzbekistan's goal tally first.

No.	Date	Venue	Opponent	Score	Result	Competition
—	25 August 2017	Markaziy Stadium, Namangan, Uzbekistan	Kyrgyzstan	4–0	5–0	Unofficial friendly
1.	13 January 2019	Rashid Stadium, Dubai, United Arab Emirates	Turkmenistan	3–0	4–0	2019 AFC Asian Cup
—	26 March 2021	Markaziy Stadium, Namangan, Uzbekistan	Ghana	2–1	2–1	Unofficial friendly
2.	7 June 2021	King Fahd International Stadium, Riyadh, Saudi Arabia	Singapore	1–0	5–0	2022 FIFA World Cup qualification
3.	7 June 2021	King Fahd International Stadium, Riyadh, Saudi Arabia	Singapore	2–0	5–0	2022 FIFA World Cup qualification
4.	11 June 2021	King Fahd International Stadium, Riyadh, Saudi Arabia	Yemen	1–0	1–0	2022 FIFA World Cup qualification
5.	27 January 2022	The Sevens Stadiums, Dubai, United Arab Emirates	South Sudan	3–0	3–0	Friendly Match
6.	29 March 2022	Markaziy Stadium, Namangan, Uzbekistan	Uganda	1–0	4–2	Friendly Match
7.	8 June 2022	Markaziy Stadium, Namangan, Uzbekistan	Sri Lanka	1–0	3–0	2023 AFC Asian Cup qualification
8.	14 June 2022	Markaziy Stadium, Namangan, Uzbekistan	Thailand	1–0	2–0	2023 AFC Asian Cup qualification
9.	11 June 2023	Milliy Stadium, Tashkent, Uzbekistan	Oman	1–0	3–0	2023 CAFA Nations Cup
10.	11 June 2023	Milliy Stadium, Tashkent, Uzbekistan	Oman	2–0	3–0	2023 CAFA Nations Cup
11.	25 December 2023	Al Maktoum Stadium, Dubai, United Arab Emirates	Kyrgyzstan	3–1	4–1	Friendly Match
12.	5 September 2024	Milliy Stadium, Tashkent, Uzbekistan	North Korea	1–0	1–0	2026 FIFA World Cup qualification

== Honours ==
Pakhtakor

- Uzbekistan Super League: 2014, 2015, 2019, 2020
- Uzbekistan Cup: 2019, 2020
- Uzbekistan League Cup: 2019

Lokomotiv Tashkent

- Uzbekistan Super League: 2017
- Uzbekistan Cup: 2017

Shabab Al-Ahli

- UAE League Cup: 2020–21
- UAE President's Cup: 2020–21

Esteghlal

- Hazfi Cup: 2024–25

Individual

- Uzbekistan Super League Top Assists: 2020
- AFC Champions League OPTA Best Midfielder (west) XI: 2020
- Uzbek FA Player of the Year: 2020
- AFC Asian Cup Team of the Tournament: 2023
