= Khojiakbar Alijonov =

Uzbek footballer (born 1997)

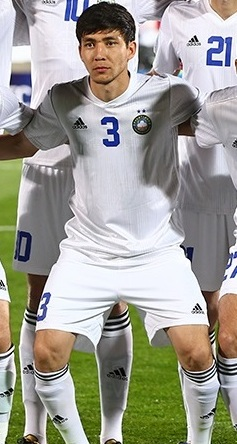
- Alijonov with FC Pakhtakor in March 2019

Personal information
- Full name: Khojiakbar Ulugbek ugli Alijonov
- Date of birth: 19 April 1997 (age 29)
- Place of birth: Tashkent, Uzbekistan
- Height: 1.80 m (5 ft 11 in)
- Position: Right-back

Team information
- Current team: Pakhtakor
- Number: 7

Youth career
- 2015–2016: Pakhtakor-2

Senior career*
Years	Team	Apps	(Gls)
2016-	Pakhtakor	180	(9)

International career^{‡}
2016	Uzbekistan U19	3	(0)
2018	Uzbekistan U23	10	(1)
2019–	Uzbekistan	42	(2)
Medal record
Representing Uzbekistan
Men's football
AFC U-23 Championship
Gold medal – first place	2018 China	Team
CAFA Nations Cup
Runner-up	2023 Kyrgyzstan–Uzbekistan	Team
Gold medal – first place	2025 Tajikistan & Uzbekistan	Team
- * Club domestic league appearances and goals as of 28 July 2026 ‡ National team caps and goals as of 28 June 2023

Khojiakbar Ulugbek ugli Alijonov (Uzbek: Hojiakbar Ulugʻbek oʻgʻli Alijonov; born 19 April 1997) is an Uzbek professional footballer who plays as a right-back for Pakhtakor in the Uzbekistan Super League and the Uzbekistan national team.

== Club career ==
On 11 February 2026, Pakhtakor announced that they had extended their contract with Alijonov until the end of the 2027 season.

== International career ==
Alijonov made his debut for the Uzbekistan national team in a 4–0 friendly win over North Korea on 7 June 2019.

== Career statistics ==
=== Club ===
As of match played 29 November 2025

Appearances and goals by club, season and competition
Club	Season	League			National cup (Note: Includes Belarusian Cup, Coupe de France, FA Cup)		Continental		Other		Total	
Club	Season	Division	Apps	Goals	Apps	Goals	Apps	Goals	Apps	Goals	Apps	Goals
Pakhtakor	2016	Uzbek League	0	0	0	0	0	0	—		0	0
Pakhtakor	2017	Uzbek League	12	0	0	0	—		—		12	0
Pakhtakor	2018	Uzbekistan Super League	4	0	1	0	0	0	—		5	1
Pakhtakor	2019	Uzbekistan Super League	21	1	3	0	8	1	3	1	35	3
Pakhtakor	2020	Uzbekistan Super League	23	0	4	0	8	0	—		35	0
Pakhtakor	2021	Uzbekistan Super League	20	0	3	0	5	0	1	0	29	01
Pakhtakor	2022	Uzbekistan Super League	22	3	2	0	6	1	1	0	31	4
Pakhtakor	2023	Uzbekistan Super League	24	2	2	0	3	0	1	0	30	2
Pakhtakor	2024	Uzbekistan Super League	14	0	2	0	5	0	—		21	0
Pakhtakor	2025	Uzbekistan Super League	26	2	5	0	3	0	—		34	2
Cateer total			166	8	22	0	41	2	6	1	235	11

=== International ===
As of match played 25 November 2024

Uzbekistan national team
Year	Apps	Goals
2019	6	0
2020	2	0
2021	6	0
2022	7	0
2023	11	1
2024	2	0
Total	34	1

Statistics accurate as of match played 5 September 2024.

=== International goals ===
Scores and results list Uzbekistan's goal tally first.

No.	Date	Venue	Opponent	Score	Result	Competition
1.	11 June 2023	Milliy Stadium, Tashkent, Uzbekistan	Oman	3–0	3–0	2023 CAFA Nations Cup
2.	20 March 2025	Milliy Stadium, Tashkent, Uzbekistan	Kyrgyzstan	1–0	1–0	2026 FIFA World Cup qualification
3.	8 September 2025	Olympic City Stadium, Tashkent, Uzbekistan	Iran	1–0	1–0	2025 CAFA Nations Cup

== Honours ==
Pakhtakor

- Uzbekistan Super League winners: 2019, 2020, 2021, 2022, 2023 runner-up: 2018
- Uzbekistan Cup winners: 2019, 2020, 2025
- Uzbekistan Super Cup winners: 2021, 2022 runner-up: 2023, 2024
- Uzbekistan League Cup winners: 2020

=== International ===
Uzbekistan U-23

- AFC U-23 Championship (champion): 2018

Uzbekistan

- CAFA Nations Cup (champion): 2025

Individual

- CAFA Nations Cup Best Player: 2025
- Uzbekistan Cup Player of the Match : 2025
