= Dragan Ćeran =

Serbian footballer

- Dragan Ćeran in 2025

Personal information
- Date of birth: 6 October 1987 (age 39)
- Place of birth: Kikinda, SR Serbia, SFR Yugoslavia
- Height: 1.90 m (6 ft 3 in)
- Position: Forward

Team information
- Current team: Andijon
- Number: 10

Senior career*
Years	Team	Apps	(Gls)
2005–2012	Smederevo	129	(18)
2006	→ Železničar Smederevo (loan)	6	(4)
2007	→ Mladi Radnik (loan)	12	(10)
2010	→ Westerlo (loan)	3	(0)
2012	Hapoel Haifa	10	(0)
2012–2013	Maccabi Netanya	24	(7)
2013–2015	Simurq	57	(27)
2015	Hajer	13	(2)
2016	Vardar	12	(5)
2016–2018	Nasaf	48	(34)
2018–2024	Pakhtakor	158	(109)
2025	Nasaf	30	(8)
2026–	Andijon	14	(3)
- * Club domestic league appearances and goals as of 29 July 2026

Dragan Ćeran (Serbian Cyrillic: Драган Ћеран; born 6 October 1987) is a Serbian professional footballer who plays as a forward for Uzbekistan Super League club Andijon. He started his career with Smederevo in the Serbian SuperLiga.

== Career ==
In August 2013, Ćeran signed for Azerbaijan Premier League side Simurq. Ćeran made his debut for Simurq in their second game of the season, away to Khazar Lankaran on 11 August 2013, coming on as an 84th-minute substitute for Salif Ballo. Ćeran's first goal for Simurq came in the 78th minute of their 2–1 victory against Inter Baku on 1 September 2013. Ćeran signed a new one-year contract with Simurq on 31 May 2014, turning down offers from Dordrecht, Levadiakos and Viborg FF.

In 2016 he moved to Uzbekistan, where he first played for the Nasaf, and in the middle of the 2018 season he moved to the capital Pakhtakor, where he later became the leader of the team's attack.

In 2019, he became the top scorer of the championship of Uzbekistan, scoring 23 goals, and was also recognized as the best football player of the Uzbekistan Super League.

On 22 January 2025, Nasaf announced the return of Ćeran.

On 25 December 2025, Andijon announced that they had signed Ćeran for the 2026 season.

== Career statistics ==
As of match played 5 November 2024

Appearances and goals by club, season and competition
Club	Season	League			National cup (Note: Includes Azerbaijan Cup, King Cup, Uzbekistan Cup)		Continental		Other		Total	
Club	Season	Division	Apps	Goals	Apps	Goals	Apps	Goals	Apps	Goals	Apps	Goals
Smederevo	2005–06	Serbian SuperLiga	9	0			—		—		9	0
Smederevo	2006–07	Serbian SuperLiga	21	1			—		—		21	1
Smederevo	2007–08	Serbian SuperLiga	14	1	0	0	—				14	1
Smederevo	2008–09	Serbian First League	28	3			—		—		28	3
Smederevo	2009–10	Serbian SuperLiga	15	3			—		—		15	3
Smederevo	2010–11	Serbian SuperLiga	28	6	1	0	—		—		29	6
Smederevo	2011–12	Serbian SuperLiga	14	4	3	0	—		—		17	4
Smederevo	Total		129	18	4	0	—				133	18
Železničar Smederevo (loan)	2005–06	Serbian League West	6	4	—		—		—		6	4
Mladi Radnik (loan)	2007–08	Serbian League West	12	10	—		—		—		12	10
Westerlo (loan)	2009–10	Belgian Pro League	3	0	0	0	—		—		3	0
Hapoel Haifa	2011–12	Israeli Premier League	10	0	1	0	—		—		11	0
Maccabi Netanya	2012–13	Israeli Premier League	24	7	1	0	0	0	—		25	7
Simurq	2013–14	Azerbaijan Premier League	31	13	1	0	—		—		32	13
Simurq	2014–15	Azerbaijan Premier League	26	14	5	4	—		—		31	18
Simurq	Total		57	27	6	4	—		—		63	31
Hajer	2015–16	Saudi Pro League	13	2	1	1	—		—		14	3
Vardar	2015–16	Macedonian First League	12	5	0	0	0	0	—		12	5
Nasaf	2016	Uzbekistan Super League	13	12	4	1	0	0	—		17	13
Nasaf	2017	Uzbekistan Super League	28	19	6	3	2 (Note: Appearances in AFC Champions League)	1	—		36	23
Nasaf	2018	Uzbekistan Super League	7	3	1	0	5	1	—		13	4
Nasaf	Total		48	34	11	4	7	2	—		66	40
Pakhtakor	2018	Uzbekistan Super League	18	3	3	0	0	0	—		21	3
Pakhtakor	2019	Uzbekistan Super League	24	23	4	5	8	2	4 (Note: Appearances in Uzbekistan League Cup)	6	40	36
Pakhtakor	2020	Uzbekistan Super League	26	21	4	3	7	2	—		37	26
Pakhtakor	2021	Uzbekistan Super League	23	16	3	0	6	2	1 (Note: Appearance in Uzbekistan Super Cup)	1	33	19
Pakhtakor	2022	Uzbekistan Super League	23	20	1	0	3	1	1	1	28	22
Pakhtakor	2023	Uzbekistan Super League	22	13	2	3	4	1	1	0	29	17
Pakhtakor	2024	Uzbekistan Super League	22	13	3	0	4	1	1	1	30	15
Pakhtakor	Total		158	109	20	11	32	9	8	9	218	138
Career total			472	216	44	20	39	11	8	9	563	256

== Honours ==
Vardar

- Macedonian First League: 2015–16

Nasaf

- Uzbekistan Cup runner-up: 2017

Pakhtakor

- Uzbekistan Super League: 2019, 2020, 2021, 2022, 2023
- Uzbekistan Cup: 2019, 2020; runner-up: 2018, 2021
- Uzbekistan Super Cup: 2021, 2022
- Uzbekistan League Cup: 2019

Individual

- Azerbaijan Premier League Top Scorer: 2014–15
- Uzbekistan Super League Top Scorer: 2019, 2020, 2021, 2022, 2023, 2024
- Uzbekistan Super League Team of the Season: 2024
