= Sherzod Azamov =

Uzbekistani footballer (born 1990)

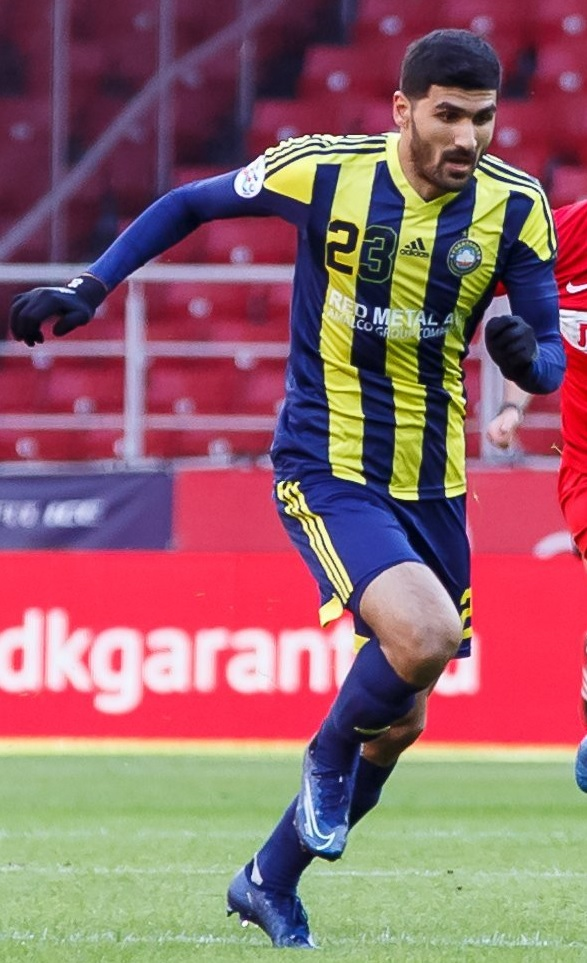
- Azamov with Pakhtakor in 2020

Personal information
- Full name: Sherzod Azamov
- Date of birth: 14 January 1990 (age 36)
- Height: 1.89 m (6 ft 2 1/2 in)
- Position: Defender

Senior career*
Years	Team	Apps	(Gls)
2009	Nasaf Qarshi	0	(0)
2010	Mash'al Mubarek	1	(0)
2011–2017	Nasaf Qarshi	99	(4)
2017–2023	Pakhtakor	101	(1)

International career
- Uzbekistan U-17
2016–2018	Uzbekistan	4	(0)
- * Club domestic league appearances and goals as of 09:29, 5 March 2025 (UTC)

Sherzod Azamov (born 14 January 1990) is a former Uzbek professional footballer who played as a defender.

== Club career ==
In December 2023, Pakhtakor announced the departure of Azamov.

== International career ==
An international player for Uzbekistan since 2016, he also have played for Uzbekistan youth teams and played in the 2009 FIFA U-20 World Cup.

== Career statistics ==
=== International ===
As of match played 7 July 2018

Appearances and goals by national team and year
National team	Year	Apps	Goals
Uzbekistan	2016	1	0
Uzbekistan	2017	1	0
Uzbekistan	2018	2	0
Total		4	0
