= Odiljon Hamrobekov =

Uzbekistani footballer (born 1996)

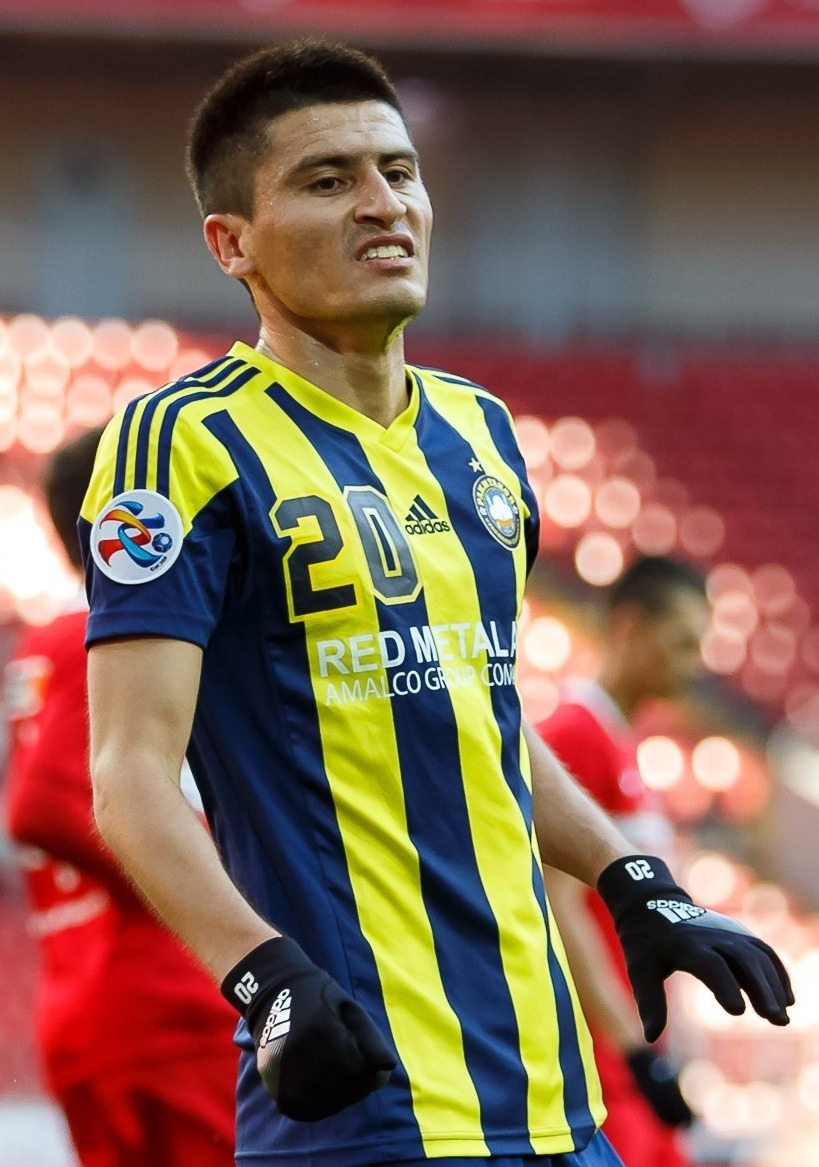
- Hamrobekov in 2020

Personal information
- Full name: Odiljon Hamrobekov
- Date of birth: 13 February 1996 (age 30)
- Place of birth: Shorqorgon, Namangan Region, Uzbekistan
- Height: 1.78 m (5 ft 10 in)
- Position: Midfielder

Team information
- Current team: Tractor
- Number: 5

Senior career*
Years	Team	Apps	(Gls)
2013–2018	Nasaf	70	(2)
2019–2020	Pakhtakor	41	(0)
2021	Shabab Al-Ahli	8	(0)
2021–2023	Pakhtakor	56	(1)
2024	Navbahor	23	(1)
2025	Bunyodkor	15	(0)
2025–	Tractor	19	(0)

International career^{‡}
2013	Uzbekistan U-17	4	(0)
2014–2015	Uzbekistan U-19	7	(0)
2015–2016	Uzbekistan U-20	5	(0)
2017–2018	Uzbekistan U-23	14	(0)
2017–	Uzbekistan	77	(1)
Medal record
Representing Uzbekistan
Men's football
AFC U-23 Championship
Winner	China 2018	Team
CAFA Nations Cup
Runner-up	2023 Kyrgyzstan–Uzbekistan	Team
Winner	2025 Tajikistan–Uzbekistan	Team
- * Club domestic league appearances and goals as of 1 March 2026 ‡ National team caps and goals as of 28 June 2026

Odiljon Sakhibjanovich Hamrobekov (Uzbek: Odiljon Soxibjon oʻgʻli Xamrobekov; born 13 February 1996) is an Uzbek professional footballer who plays as a midfielder for Tractor and the Uzbekistan national team.

== Club career ==
He began his professional career with Nasaf in 2013, playing for the club for seven years in the Uzbekistan Super League. During his time there, he won the Uzbekistan Cup in 2015 and reached the final of the competition the following season. He also featured in international matches in the AFC Champions League.

Ahead of the 2019 season, he joined Pakhtakor Tashkent. From March to July 2021, he played on loan for UAE Pro League side Shabab Al Ahli, with whom he won the UAE President's Cup. During his spell with Pakhtakor, he won the Uzbekistan Super League title four times, the Uzbekistan Cup twice, and the Uzbekistan Super Cup once.

He subsequently played for Navbahor and Bunyodkor. Since July 2025, he has been a player of Iranian club Tractor, based in Tabriz. His first trophy with the club was the Iranian Super Cup, which Tractor won after defeating Esteghlal 2–1.

== International career ==
He represented the Uzbekistan U-17 national team at the 2013 FIFA U-17 World Cup in the United Arab Emirates, where Uzbekistan reached the Round of 16. He also participated in the AFC U-16 Championship.

With the Uzbekistan U-20 national team, he competed at the 2015 FIFA U-20 World Cup in New Zealand, helping the team reach the quarter-finals. In January 2018, he won the AFC U-23 Championship with the Uzbekistan U-23 national team. Hamrobekov was also named the tournament's best player.

He began receiving call-ups to the Uzbekistan national team in 2017 and made his senior international debut in November 2017 in a friendly match against the United Arab Emirates, which Uzbekistan lost 1–0.

He was a member of Uzbekistan's squads for the 2019 and 2023 AFC Asian Cup. In 2023, he finished as a runner-up in the CAFA Nations Cup, before winning the tournament in 2025. He was also part of the Uzbekistan team that secured qualification for the FIFA World Cup for the first time in the country's history, earning a place at the 2026 tournament in the United States, Canada, and Mexico.

By the end of 2025, he had made 69 official appearances for the Uzbekistan national team, scoring one goal, which came against Qatar.

On 2 June 2026, he was included in the 26-man squad selected by head coach Fabio Cannavaro for the 2026 FIFA World Cup, marking the country's first-ever appearance in the tournament.

== Career statistics ==
=== Club ===
As of match played 6 March 2021

Club	Season	League			National Cup		League Cup		Continental		Other		Total	
Club	Season	Division	Apps	Goals	Apps	Goals	Apps	Goals	Apps	Goals	Apps	Goals	Apps	Goals
Pakhtakor Tashkent	2019	Uzbekistan Super League	20	0	4	0	1	1	7	0	–		32	0
Pakhtakor Tashkent	2020	Uzbekistan Super League	21	0	4	0	–		8	0	–		33	0
Pakhtakor Tashkent	Total		41	0	8	0	1	1	15	0	-	-	65	1
Shabab Al Ahli	2020–21	UAE Pro League	8	0	0	0	0	0	–		–		8	0
Career total			49	0	8	0	1	1	15	0	-	-	73	1

=== International ===
Uzbekistan national team
Year	Apps	Goals
2017	1	0
2018	8	0
2019	8	0
2020	1	0
2021	7	0
2022	9	0
2023	12	0
2024	5	1
Total	51	1

Statistics accurate as of match played 3 February 2024

No.	Date	Venue	Opponent	Score	Result	Competition
1.	3 February 2024	Al Bayt Stadium, Al Khor, Qatar	Qatar	1–1	1–1	2023 AFC Asian Cup

== Honours ==
=== Club ===
Nasaf

- Uzbekistan Super League runner-up (1): 2017
- Uzbekistan Cup (1): 2015
- Uzbekistan Cup runner-up (2): 2013, 2016
- Uzbekistan Super Cup (1): 2016

Pakhtakor

Uzbekistan Super League: 2019, 2020, 2021, 2022

Shabab Al-Ahli

- UAE League Cup: 2020–21
- UAE President's Cup: 2020–21

Tractor

- Iranian Super Cup: 2025

=== International ===
- AFC U-23 Championship: 2018

=== Individual ===
- AFC U-23 Championship Most Valuable Player: 2018
