= Eldorbek Suyunov =

Uzbekistani footballer

Personal information
- Full name: Eldorbek Suyunov
- Date of birth: April 12, 1991 (age 35)
- Place of birth: Qarshi, Soviet Union
- Height: 1.93 m (6 ft 4 in)
- Position: Goalkeeper

Team information
- Current team: Neftchi Fergana
- Number: 25

Youth career
- 2008–2012: Nasaf Qarshi

Senior career*
Years	Team	Apps	(Gls)
2011–2017	Nasaf Qarshi	51	(0)
2017–2024	Pakhtakor	83	(0)
2024	Navbahor	6	(0)
2025–	Neftchi Fergana	4	(0)

International career^{‡}
2010–2011	Uzbekistan U-20	2	(0)
2012	Uzbekistan U-23	1	(0)
2013–2021	Uzbekistan	28	(0)
- * Club domestic league appearances and goals as of 10 August 2025 ‡ National team caps and goals as of 12 April 2023

Eldorbek Suyunov (Uzbek Cyrillic: Элдорбек Суюнов; born 12 April 1991) is an Uzbek professional footballer who plays as a goalkeeper for Uzbekistan Super League club Neftchi Fergana.

== Career ==
He was a player of Nasaf's youth academy and in 2008 he started to play for Nasaf's youth team. In 2011 he began to play for the first team. Since 2012 he has established himself Nasaf's number one goalkeeper. He played at the 2015 AFC Asian Cup qualification.

On 4 December 2022, Suyunov extended his contract with Pakhtakor Tashkent until the end of the 2024 season.

== Honours ==
=== Club ===
Nasaf

- Uzbek League runners-up (1): 2011
- Uzbek Cup runners-up (3): 2011, 2012, 2013
- AFC Cup (1): 2011
