= List of foreign football players in Uzbekistan Super League =

This is a list of foreign football players who played in the Super League in the 2026 season. The following players have been born outside Uzbekistan and have not been capped for the Uzbek national team at any level. From season 2026, four foreign players per squad will be allowed, one from Asia and three from the rest of the world.

In bold: players who have played at least one Super League game in the (2026) season, and were still at a club for which they played. This does not include players of a Super League club who did not play a Super League game in the 2026 season.

Details correct as of 10 August 2026

== Albania ==
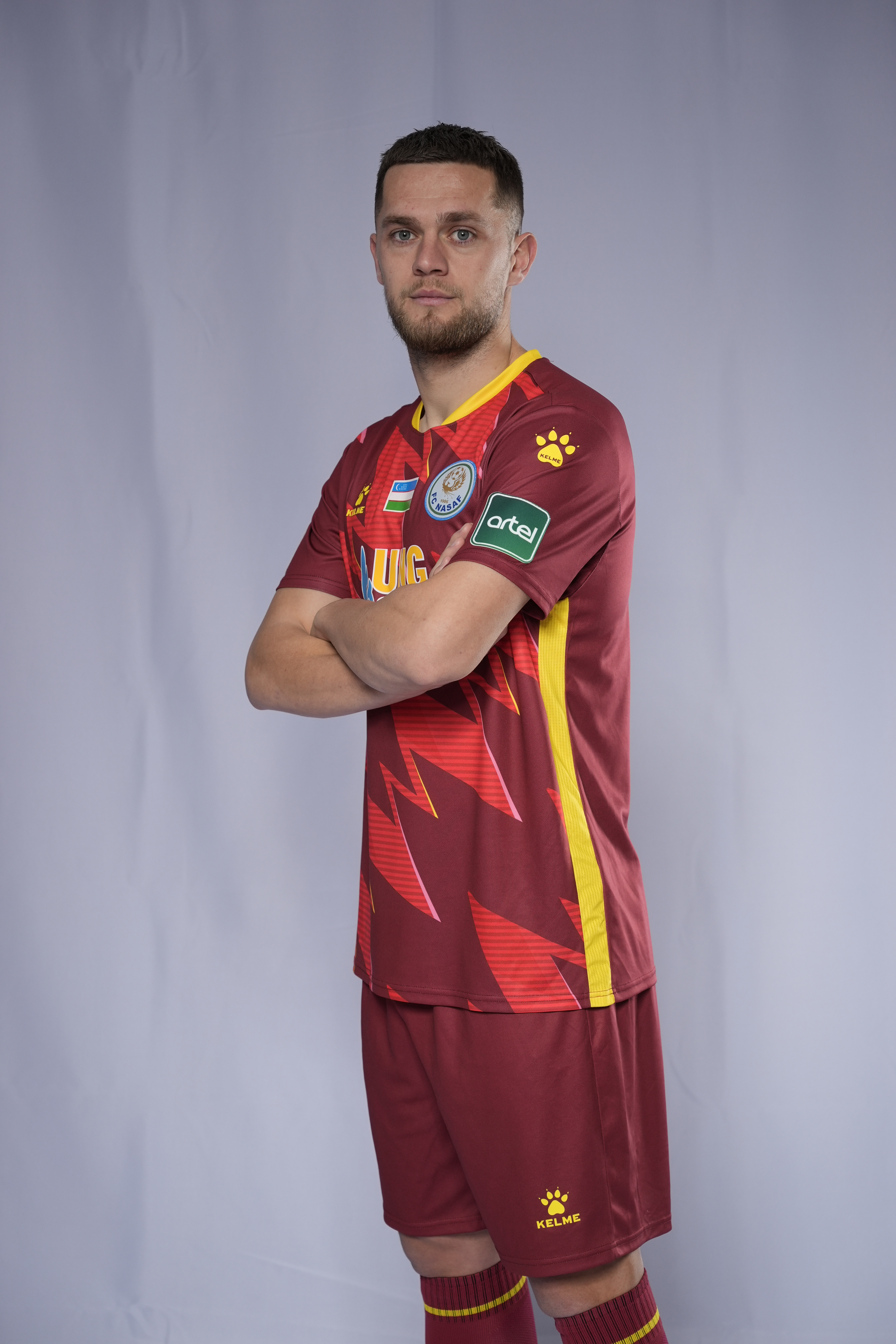
Rubin Hebaj with Nasaf in 2025

- Rubin Hebaj — Andijon (2023), Nasaf (2025), Sogdiana (2025)
- Luis Kaçorri — Bunyodkor (2024–2025)
- Klejdi Daci — AGMK (2024–2025), Kokand 1912 (2025)

== Argentina ==
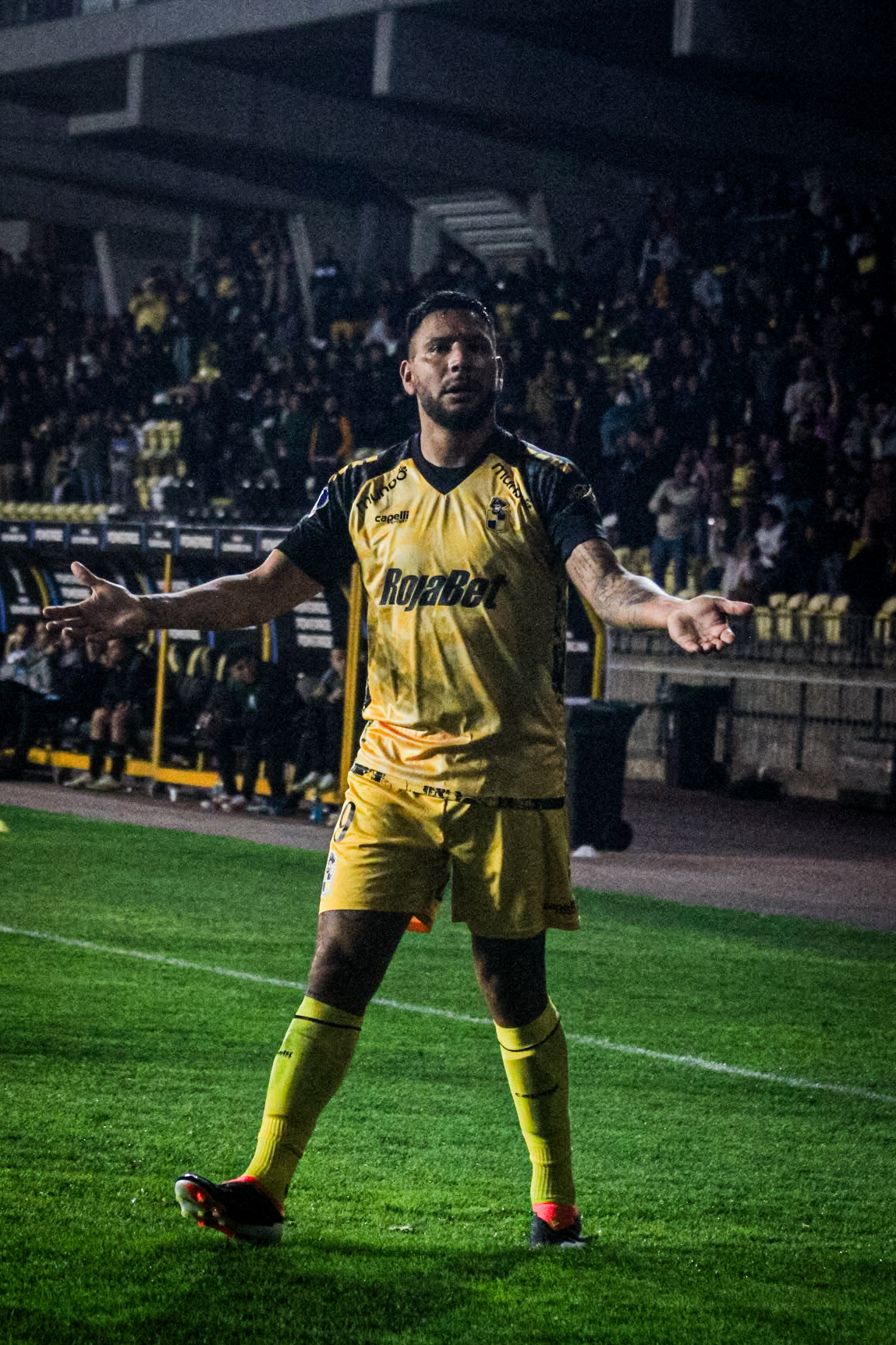
Andrés Chávez playing for Nasaf in 2023

- Gonzalo Ritacco — Qizilqum (2022)
- Andrés Chávez — Nasaf (2023)
- Salvador Sánchez — Dinamo (2026)

== Armenia ==
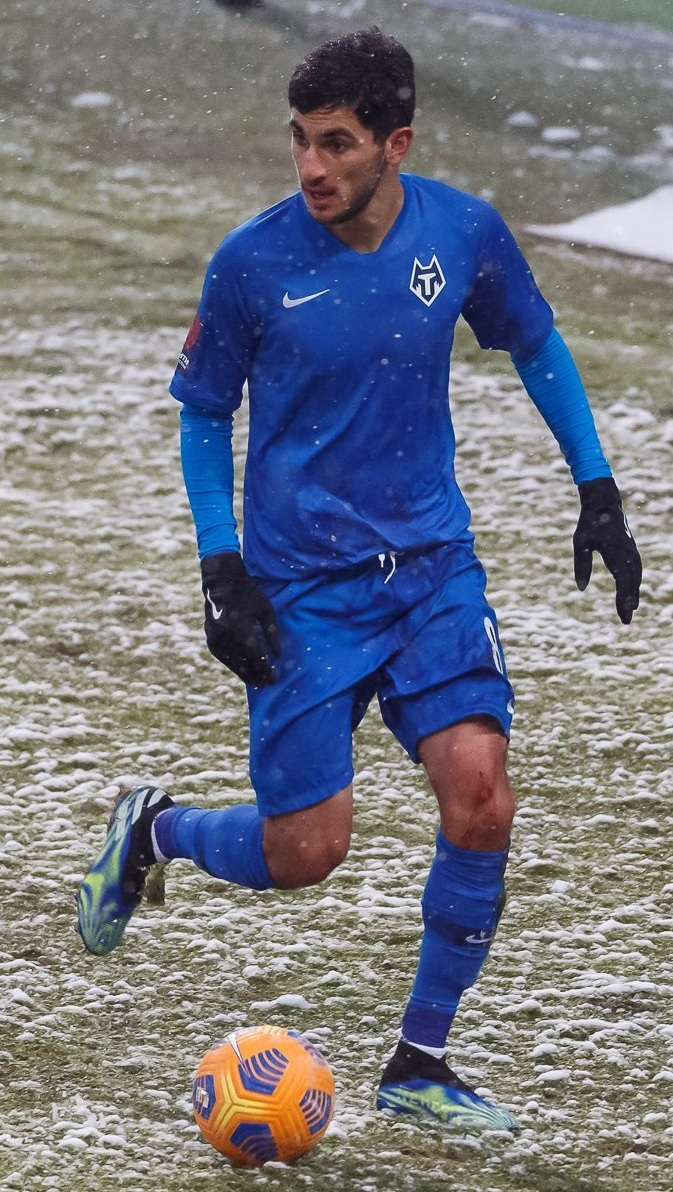
Tigran Avanesyan was born in Tashkent, Uzbekistan but represented Armenia for Dinamo in 2026

- Khoren Hovhannisyan — Pakhtakor (1989–1991)
- Aram Voskanyan — Lokomotiv (2010)
- Arsen Manasyan — Lokomotiv (2011)
- Romik Khachatryan — Lokomotiv (2012—2013)
- Zhora Hovhannisyan — Lokomotiv (2012—2013), Pakhtakor (2013—2014)
- Ruslan Koryan — Lokomotiv (2015)
- **Tigran Avanesyan** — Dinamo (2026 present)

== Australia ==
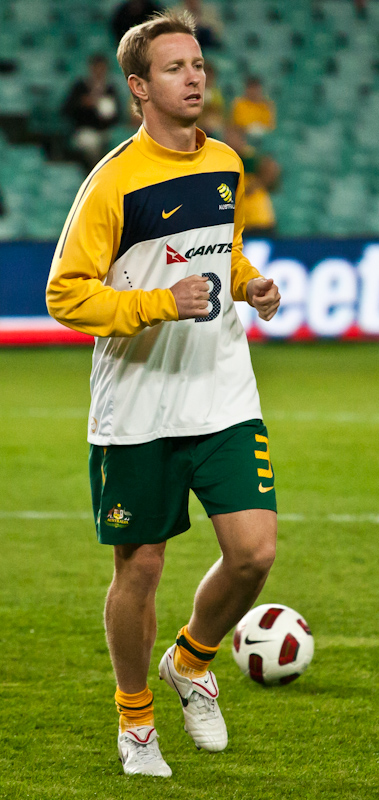
David Carney, First Australian player.

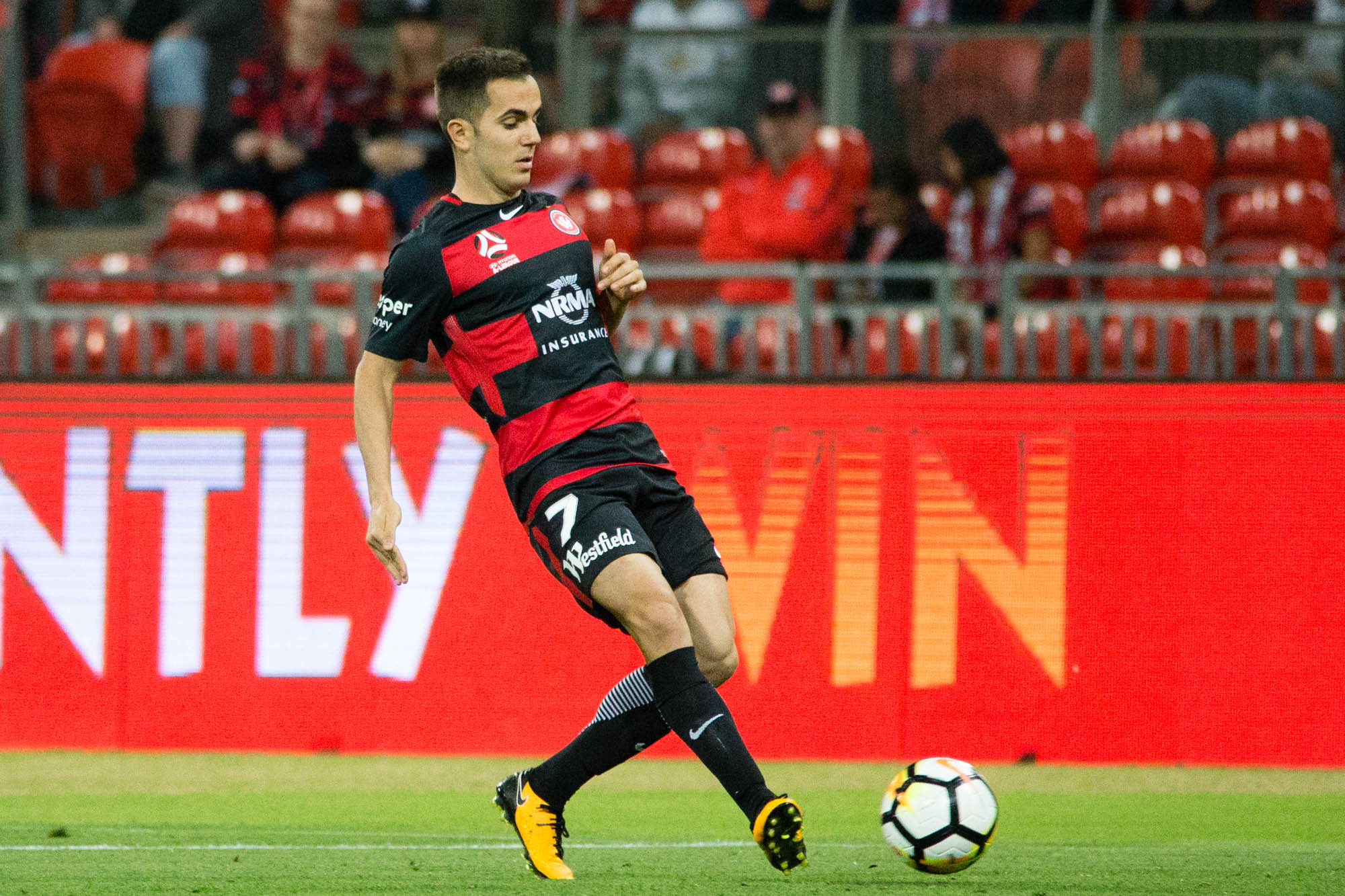
Steven Lustica with Qizilqum in 2019

- David Carney — Bunyodkor (2012)
- Petar Franjic – AGMK (2014)
- Rostyn Griffiths — Pakhtakor (2017–2018)
- Steven Lustica – Qizilqum (2019)
- Tomislav Mrčela — Neftchi (2023)
- **Aleksandar Šušnjar** — Lokomotiv (2026 present)

== Azerbaijan ==
- Elshan Gambarov — Navbahor (1998, 2002), Dinamo (2000—2002), Mash'al (2003)
- Ilgar Goseinov — Mash'al (2005–2010)

== Belarus ==
- Oleg Syrokvashko – Navbahor (1993)
- Aleksei Khaletskiy – Mash'al (2010)
- Mikalay Ryndzyuk – Mash'al (2010–2011) Dinamo Samarqand (2011) Navbahor (2012)
- Vitaly Rushnitsky – FC Shurtan Guzar (2011–2012)
- Syarhey Krot – Nasaf (2011)
- Vital Panasyuk – Navbahor (2012)
- Igor Tymonyuk – Mash'al Mubarek (2015, 2017)
- Mikita Bukatkin – Mash'al Mubarek (2015)
- Alyaksey Khaletski – Mash'al Mubarek (2015)
- Terentiy Lutsevich — Neftchi (2017)
- Uladzislaw Kasmynin — AGMK (2017–2018, 2019) FC Qizilqum (2020), Turon (2021), Metallurg Bekabad (2023)
- Dzmitry Kamarowski – FC Neftchi (2017)
- Syarhey Kantsavy – FC Neftchi (2017)
- Sergey Rusetsky – Bukhara (2018)
- Vasiliy Sovpel — Andijon (2021)
- Pavel Zabelin — Andijon (2021)
- Viktar Sotnikaw – Bunyodkor (2023)
- Aleksey Nosko – Bunyodkor (2023), Sogdiana Jizzakh (2024)
- Artyom Sokol – Surkhon (2023), Dinamo Samarqand (2024)
- Pavel Pavlyuchenko – Pakhtakor (2023–2024)
- Sergey Karpovich – Navbahor (2025)
- **Mikalay Ivanow** – Lokomotiv (2026 present)

== Bosnia and Herzegovina ==
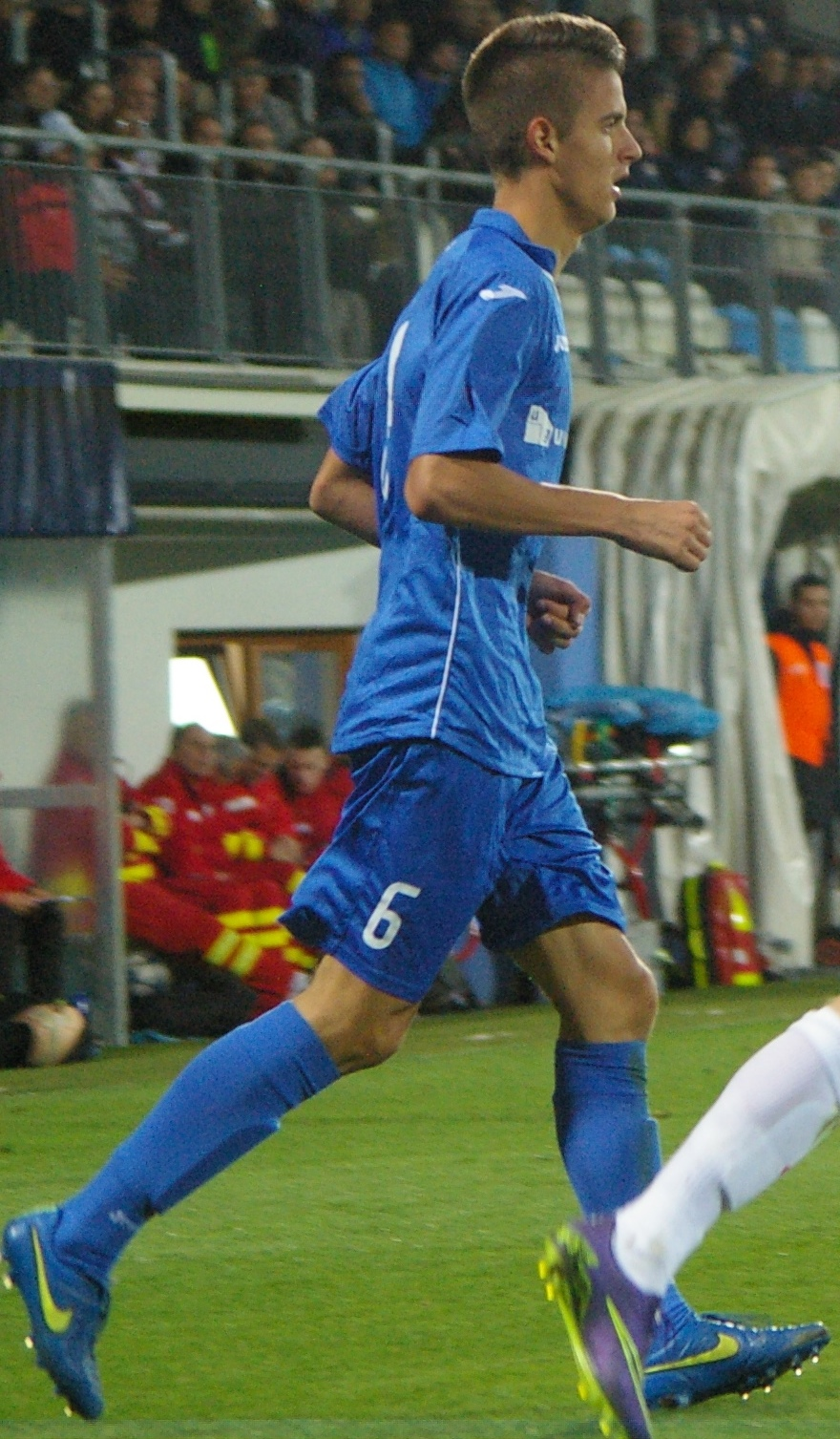
Kerim Palić playing for Metallurg Bekabad in 2022–2024 season

- Samir Bekrić — Bunyodkor (2014–2016)
- Nemanja Janičić — Lokomotiv (2015–2017)
- Haris Dilaver – Nasaf (2020)
- Semir Smajlagić – Nasaf (2022)
- Aleksandar Glišić — Dinamo (2022)
- Kerim Palić — Metallurg (2022–2024)
- Tarik Isić — Sogdiana (2023)
- **Dženan Zajmović** – Sogdiana (2023, 2026 present)
- Luka Kukić — Bukhara (2023)
- Samir Zeljković — Bunyodkor (2024)
- **Dominik Begić** — Bukhara (2024 present)
- Mirzad Mehanović — Andijon (2025)
- **Haris Hajdarević** — Dinamo (2026 present)

== Brazil ==
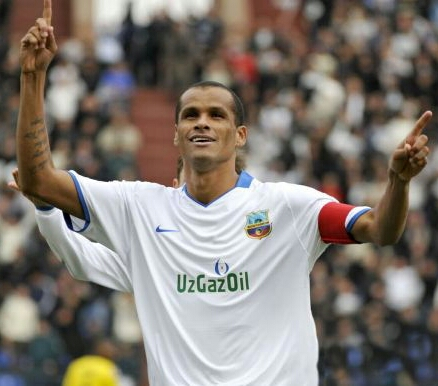
2002 FIFA World Cup winner Rivaldo joined Bunyodkor in 2008

Fabio Pinto with Pakhtakor in 2008

- Anderson Fabiano — Pakhtakor (1998)
- Gaviolli Silvio Sezar — Surkhon (2003)
- Everton Cavalcante — Lokomotiv (2006—2008), Dinamo (2009), Khorazm (2009–2010)
- Wilson Teixeira – Lokomotiv (2008)
- Fabio Pinto — Pakhtakor (2008)
- Luizao — Bunyodkor (2008—2009)
- Rivaldo — Bunyodkor (2008—2010)
- Leomar Rodrigues — Bunyodkor (2009)
- Joao Victor — Bunyodkor (2009—2010)
- Edson Ramos — Bunyodkor (2009—2010)
- Denílson — Bunyodkor (2010)
- Tiago Bezerra — Pakhtakor (2017—2018)
- Nivaldo – Lokomotiv (2018)
- Luquinhas – Surkhon (2019)
- Douglas Nacsimento – Surkhon (2019)
- Elivelto — Sogdiana (2020)
- Guttiner — Navbahor (2021)
- Mateus Lima — Nasaf (2022–2023)
- Wellington Taira — Bunyodkor (2023)
- Victor da Silva – Nasaf (2024)
- **Jurani Ferreira** – Dinamo (2024–2025), Neftchi (2026 present)
- **Maykon Douglas** — Dinamo (2024–2025) Qizilqum (2026 present)
- Marcos Kayck — Dinamo (2024)
- Guilherme Guedes — Navbahor (2025)
- Pedro — Navbahor (2025)
- Higor Gabriel — Navbahor (2025)
- Jhonatan — Pakhtakor (2025)
- **Flamarion** — Pakhtakor (2025 present)
- Jonatan Lucca — Pakhtakor (2025)
- Júlio César — Navbahor (2025)
- **Rafael Sabino** — Khorazm (2026 present)
- **Elzio Lohan** — Khorazm (2026 present)
- **Alex Fernanes** — Navbahor (2026 present)
- **Rafael Tavares** — Khorazm (2026 present)
- **Yan Sasse** – Neftchi (2026 present)
- **Michel** – Neftchi (2026 present)

== Bulgaria ==
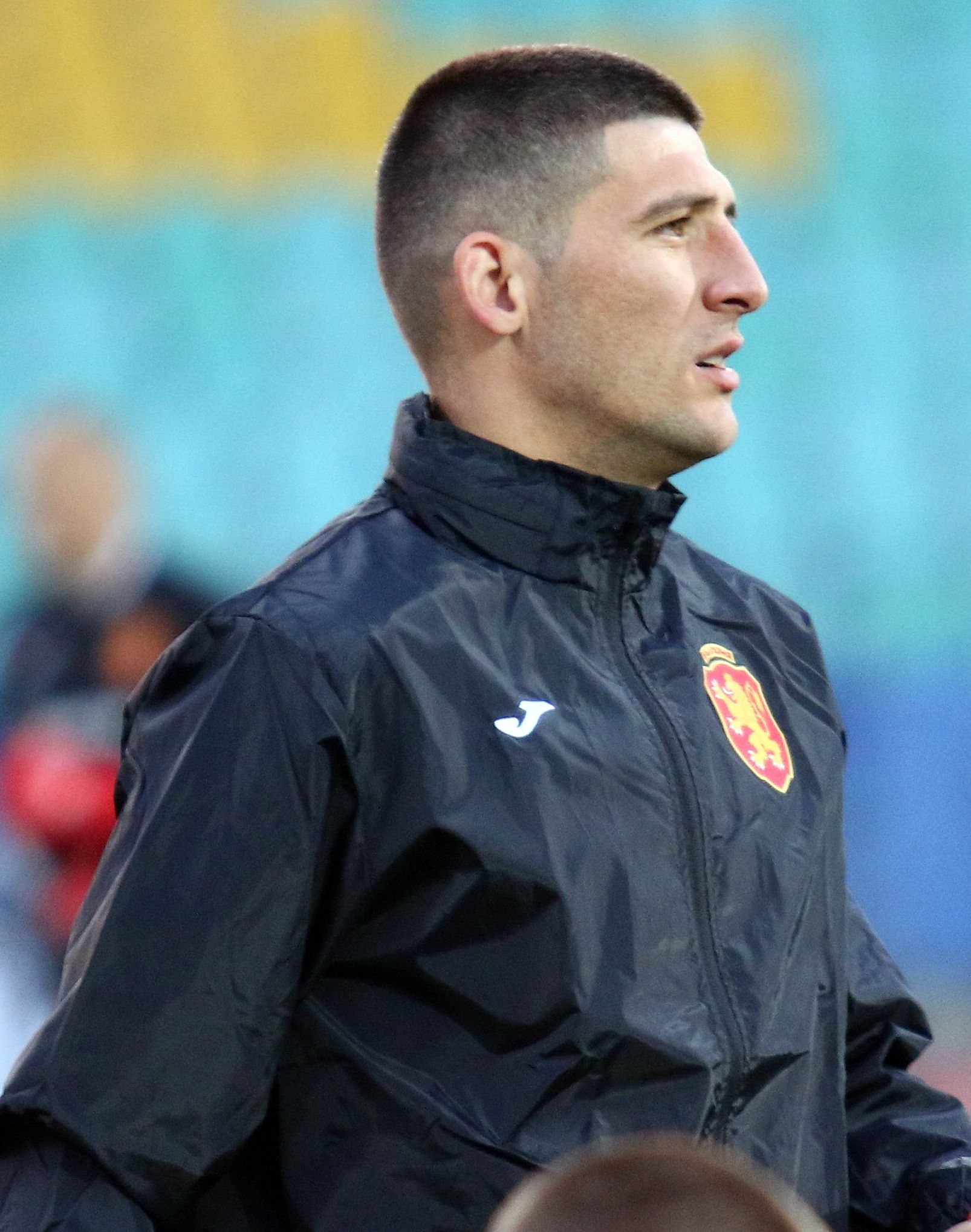
Kamen Hadzhiev playing for Pakhtakor in 2022

- Nikolay Chipev — Dinamo (2015), Buxoro (2015)
- Petar Denchev — Navbahor (2014—2015)
- Plamen Dimov — Andijon (2021)
- Kamen Hadzhiev — Pakhtakor (2022)

== Burkina Faso ==
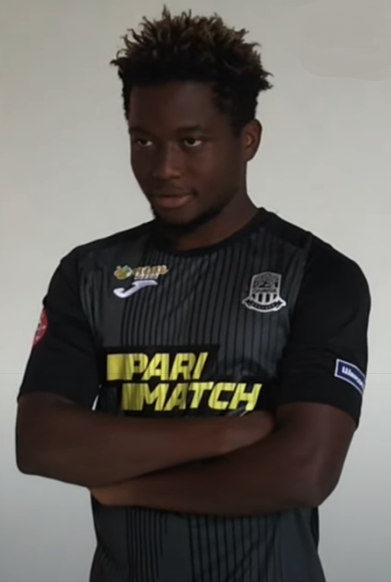
Burkina-Faso international Dramane Salou joined Dinamo in 2026

- Mohamed Kone — Lokomotiv (2017)
- Faysal Traoré — Nasaf (2020)
- Dramane Salou — Dinamo (2026)

== Cape Verde ==
- Alvin Fortes — AGMK (2021)

== Cameroon ==
- Ngaha-Chamoa Gi-Marten — Buxoro (1999)
- Frank Kevin Lewa — Shurchi (2006)
- Armand Ken Ella — Mash'al (2020)
- Jerome Mpasko Etame — Lokomotiv Tashkent (2022)
- Ngu Abega Enyang — Turon (2023)

== Canada ==
- Milovan Kapor – Buxoro (2019–2020)

== Chile ==
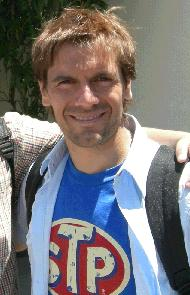
José Luis Villanueva playing for Bunyodkor in 2008–2009

- José Luis Villanueva — Bunyodkor (2008—2009)

== Colombia ==
- Brayan Riascos — Pakhtakor (2025)

== Croatia ==
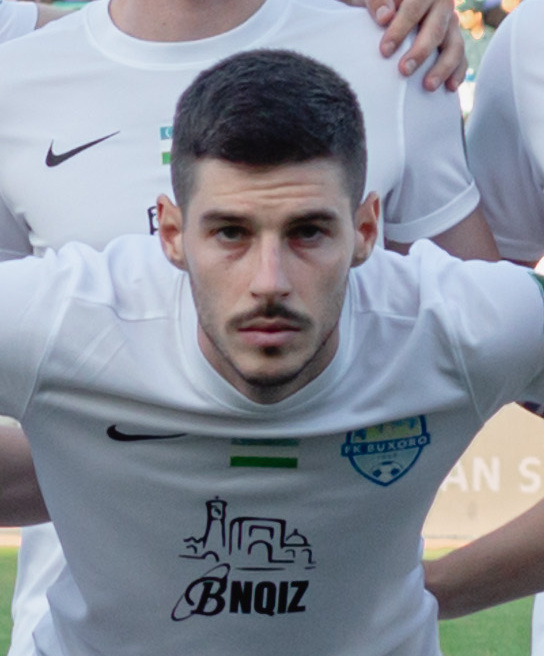
Frane Čirjak with Bukhara in 2025

- Jurica Buljat — Bunyodkor (2016), Pakhtakor (2017)
- Ivor Weitzer — Bukhara (2017)
- Edin Junuzović — Bukhara (2020)
- Jure Obšivač — Sogdiana (2022)
- Šime Žužul — Lokomotiv (2023)
- Frane Ikić — Bukhara (2023–2025)
- Marin Ljubić — Bunyodkor (2024)
- Frane Čirjak — Bunyodkor (2024), Bukhara (2025)
- Toni Jović — Bunyodkor (2024)
- Andrija Filipović — Bunyodkor (2024)
- Mihael Klepač — AGMK (2024)
- Josip Tomašević — Bukhara (2025)
- Martin Šroler — Bunyodkor (2025)
- **Stipe Perica** – Neftchi (2026 present)
- **Ivan Pešić** — AGMK (2026 present)

== Dominican Republic ==
- Luismi Quezada — Surkhon (2022)

== DR Congo ==
- Katulondi Kati — Navbahor (2026)

== Estonia ==
- Vladislav Ivanov – Mash'al (2015)
- Artjom Dmitrijev — Qizilqum (2022)

== Finland ==
- Toni Lindberg — Mash'al (2012)
- **Marcus Forss** – Neftchi (2026 present)

== France ==
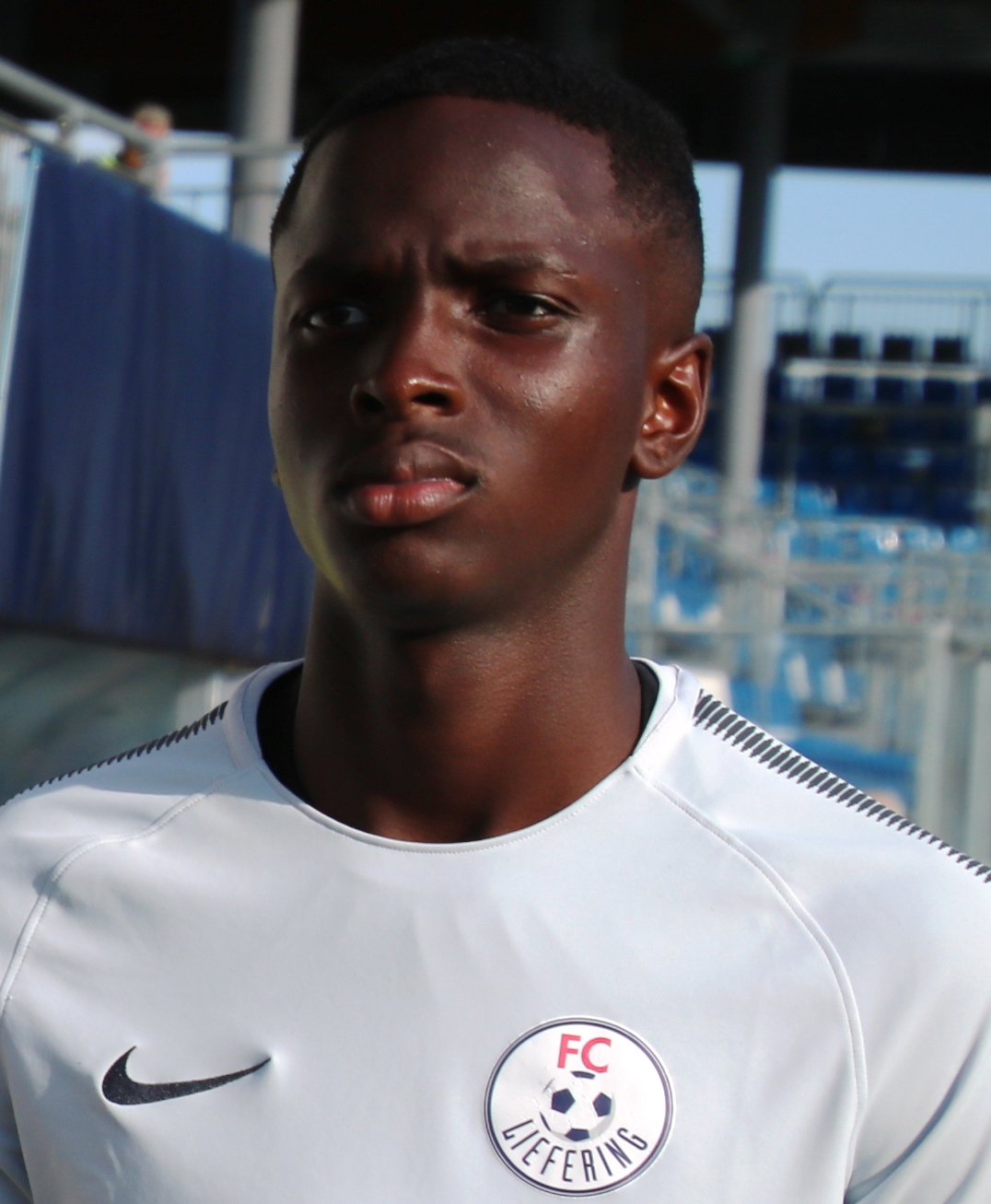
Former Paris Saint-Germain Defender Mahamadou Dembélé joined Dinamo in 2026

- Mahamadou Dembélé — Dinamo (2026)
- **Yanis Lhéry** — Khorazm (2026 present)

== Gabon ==
- Thibault Tchicaya – AGMK (2010–2011)

== Georgia ==
- Giorgi Krasovski — Andijan (2008)
- Vladimir Gochashvili — Andijan (2008)
- Ramaz Dzhabnidze – FC Nasaf (2008)
- Zurab Avaliani — Andijan (2008)
- Mamuka Gongadze (footballer) – Mash'al Mubarek (2009)
- Grigol Imedadze – Mash'al Mubarek (2010)
- Kakhi Makharadze — Pakhtakor (2011—2015), Sogdiana (2019) Lokomotiv Tashkent (2009—2010, 2016—2018, 2020–2022)
- Mikheil Makhviladze — FK Khorezm (2010)
- Georgiy Kvesieshvili – FK Buxoro (2011–2012, 2013–2014), FC AGMK (2013), Qizilqum Zarafshon (2015–2016)
- Irakli Klimiashvili — Pakhtakor (2011—2012)
- Mikhail Kakaladze – FK Buxoro (2011–2012)
- Levan Mdivnishvili — Andijan (2012)
- Mikheil Alavidze — FC Andijon (2012)
- Giorgi Megreladze – FC Shurtan Guzar (2012–2013)
- Shota Grigalashvili – FC AGMK (2017)
- Elgujja Grigalashvili – Qizilqum Zarafshon (2018–2019), FC AGMK (2019–2021)
- Lasha Totadze – Qizilqum Zarafshon (2019)
- Mate Vatsadze – Qizilqum Zarafshon (2019) FC AGMK (2020)
- Vili Isiani – FK Buxoro (2019)
- Jaba Lipartia – FK Buxoro (2019–2020)

== Germany ==
- Julien Oteng-Mensah — Shurtan (2008)
- Alexander Frank — Qizilqum (2011—2012)

== Ghana ==
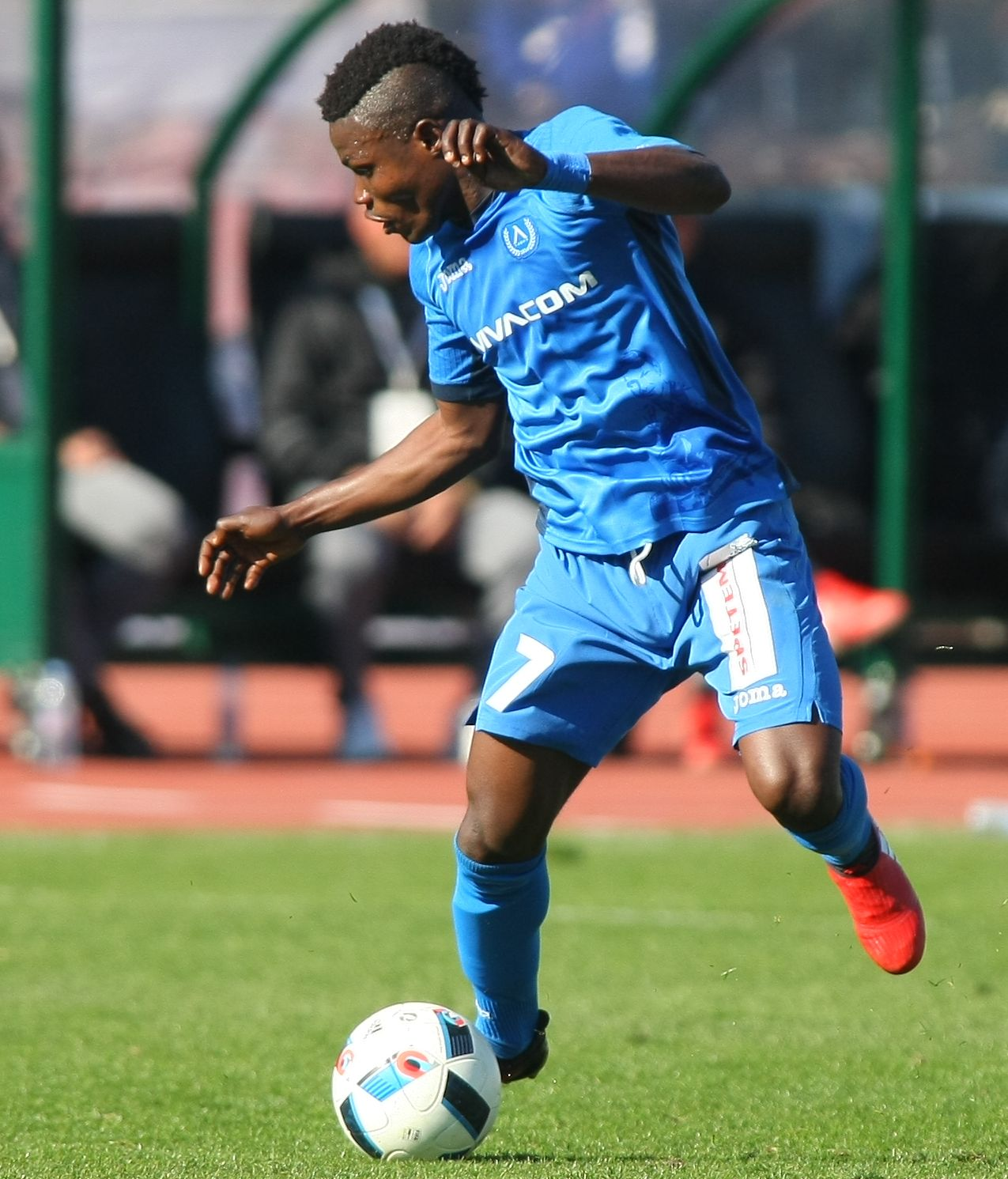
Francis Narh has played for Bunyodkor, Dinamo, and Khorazm in the Uzbekistan Super League

- Richard Sewe – Mash'al (2007)
- Jerry Emonkpari – Metalourg Bekabad (2010)
- Kwame Karikari – Turon (2021)
- Francis Narh — Bunyodkor (2022), Dinamo (2023–2024) Khorazm (2025)
- Joel Kojo — Dinamo (2023)
- Emmanuel Yaghr — Dinamo (2024)
- Salifu Mudasiru — Mash'al (2025)
- Kingsley Sarfo — Dinamo (2026)
- Rashid Abubakar — Mash'al (2026)

== Guinea-Bissau ==
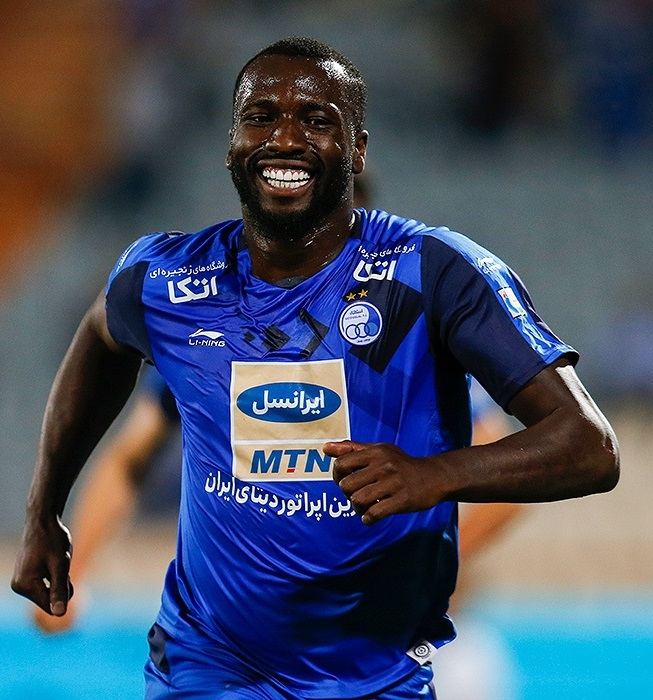
Esmaël Gonçalves scored 16 goals in 21 games for Pakhtakor during the 2018 season

- Esmaël Gonçalves — Pakhtakor (2018)

== Guinea ==
- **Amadou Doumbouya** — Dinamo (2026 present)

== Hungary ==
- Péter Vörös — Lokomotiv (2009—2010)

== Iran ==
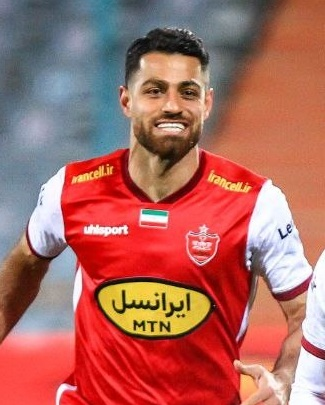
Iran international Morteza Pouraliganji joined Pakhtakor in 2026

- **Siavash Hagh Nazari** — AGMK (2022–2023, 2026 present) Navbahor (2024)
- Reza Yazdandoost — Metallurg (2023–2024)
- Danial Mahini — Metallurg (2023)
- **Morteza Pouraliganji** — Pakhtakor (2026 present)

== Iraq ==
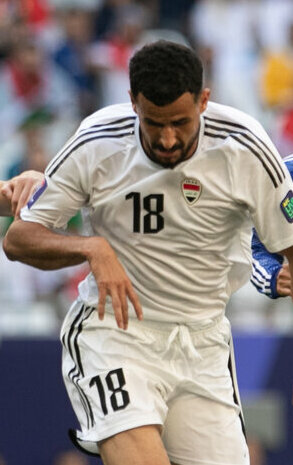
Iraq international Aymen Hussein joined Pakhtakor in 2026

- Haidar Abdul-Razzaq — Andijon (2011)
- **Bashar Resan** — Pakhtakor (2025 present)
- **Zaid Tahseen** — Pakhtakor (2025 present)
- **Aymen Hussein** — Pakhtakor (2026 present)

== Israel ==
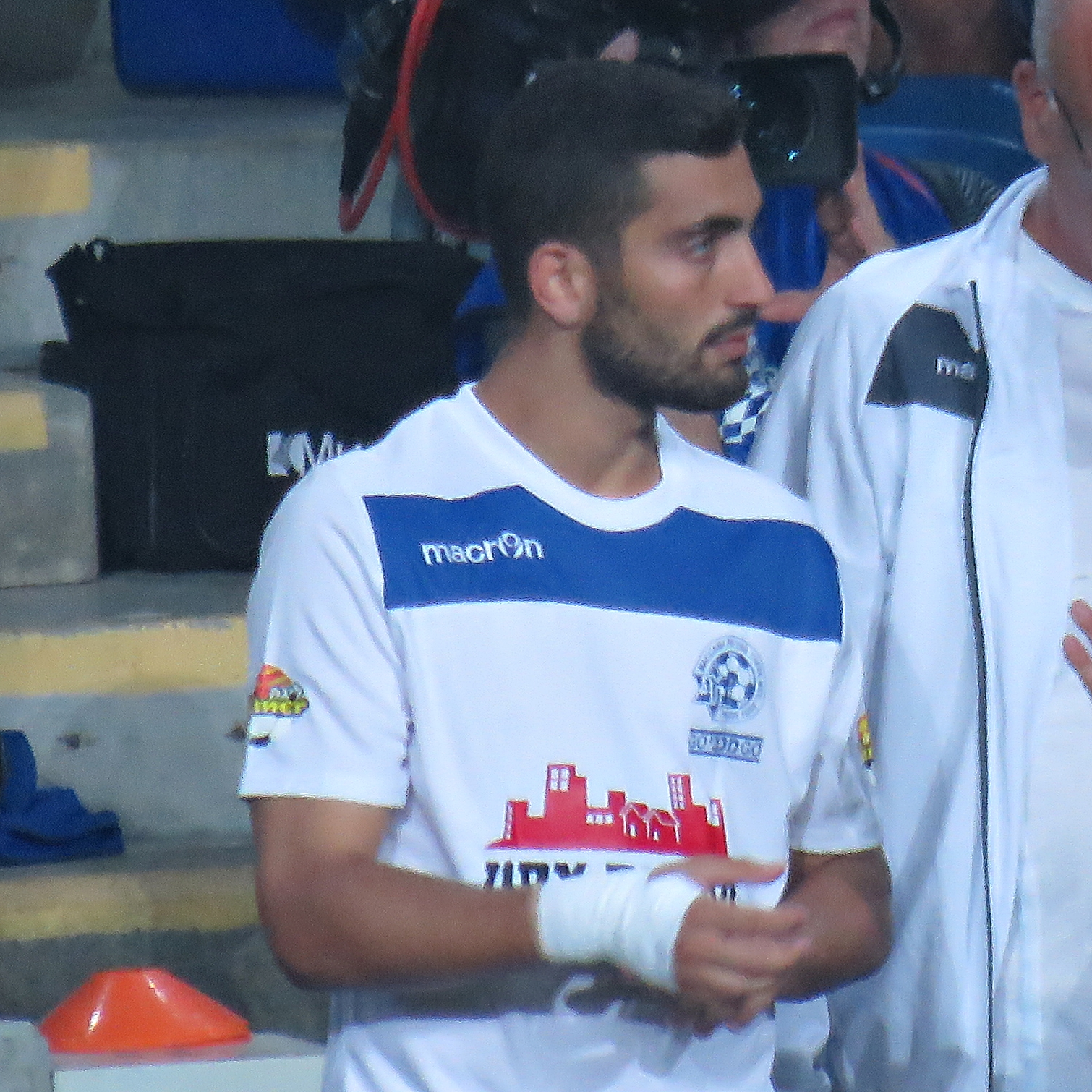
Gidi Kanyuk scored 1 goal in 14 games for Pakhtakor during the 2017 season

- Gidi Kanyuk — Pakhtakor (2017, 2019)

== Italy ==
- **Martin Boakye** — Andijon (2021, 2026 present), AGMK (2021–2023)
- **Federico Botti** — Bunyodkor (2026 present)

== Ivory Coast ==
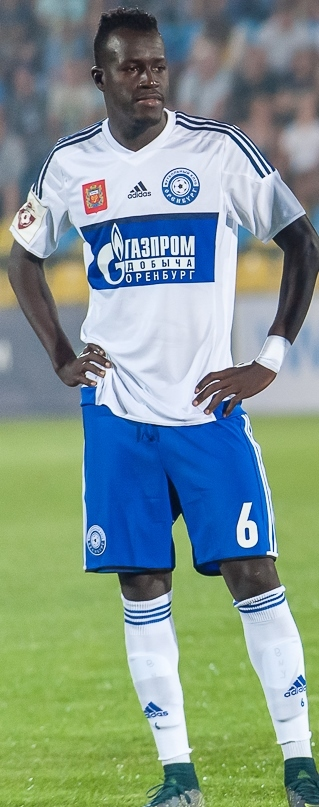
Yacouba Bamba with Kokand 1912 in 2020–2021 season

- Taïna Adama Soro - Shurtan (2012)
- Gnohere Krizo — Lokomotiv (2017)
- Yacouba Bamba — Kokand 1912 (2020–2021)
- Kobena Amed — Kokand 1912 (2025)
- **Koffi Kouao** — Neftchi (2026 present)

== Japan ==
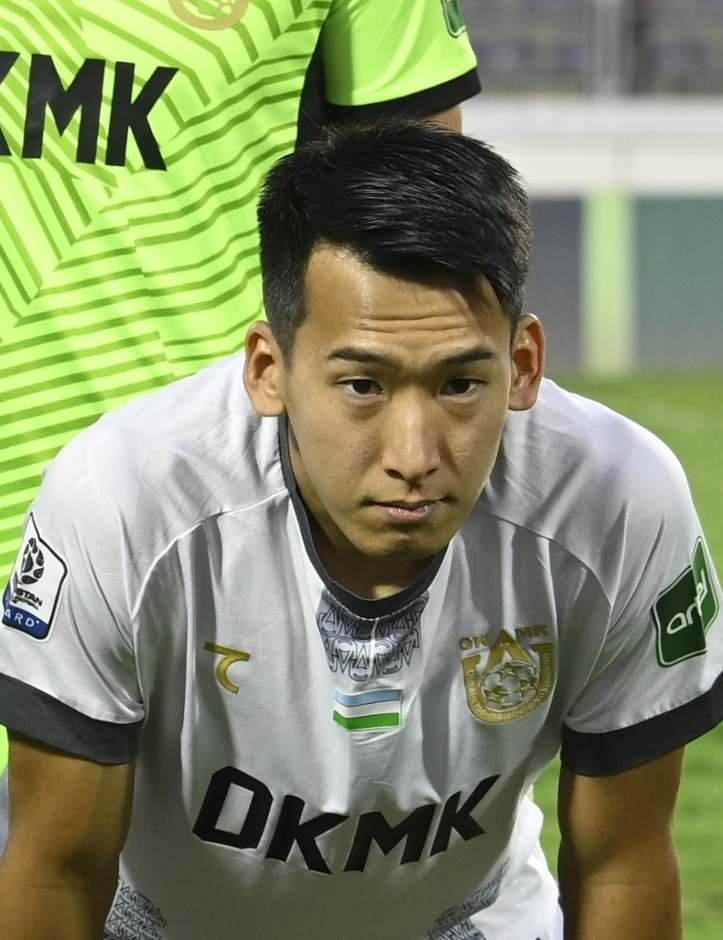
Arihiro Sentoku with AGMK in 2025 season

- Naoya Shibamura — Pakhtakor (2012), Bukhara (2012—2013)
- Minori Sato — Bunyodkor (2014—2016)
- Tomoki Muramatsu — Mash'al (2017)
- Yudai Koike — Dinamo (2023)
- Itsuki Urata — Bunyodkor (2024–2026)
- **Arihiro Sentoku** — AGMK (2024 present)
- Naoaki Senaga — AGMK (2025–2026)

== Kazakhstan ==
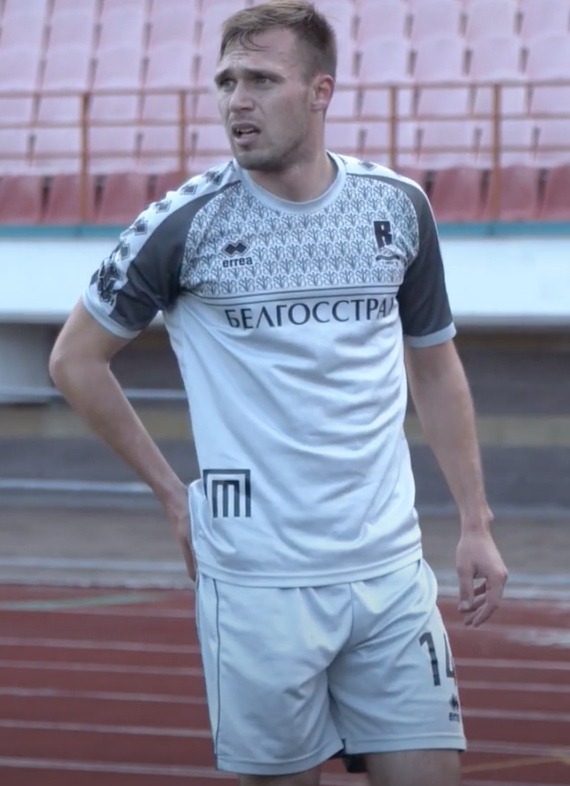
Vladislav Vasilyev with Andijon in 2021 season

- Farkhad Mirsalimbaev — Dustlik (1998–2001), Metallurg Bekabad (2006)
- Konstantin Galchenko – Navbahor (1998–2000)
- Konstantin Pavlyuchenko – Navbahor (1998)
- Timur Khalmuratov – Traktor Tashkent (2003–2004)
- Andrey Shumara — Bukhara (2006), Andijan (2007)
- Konstantin Kanin — Navbahor (2007), Andijon (2008), AGMK (2008)
- Aleksey Negmatov – Andijon (2007)
- Almat Bekbaev — Andijan (2007)
- Arsen Tlekhugov – Bukhara (2008)
- Kairat Utabayev — Andijon (2009)
- Viktor Kozhushko — Mash'al (2009)
- Nurpeys Turekulov — NBU Osiyo (2010)
- Aleksardr Stakhev — Mash'al (2010)
- Ilya Fomitchev — Mash'al (2012)
- Valery Fomichev – AGMK (2015)
- Aleksandr Kirov — Kokand 1912 (2015)
- Kirill Pasichnik — Bukhara (2017)
- Vladislav Vasilyev — Andijon (2021)
- Abinur Nurymbet — Andijon (2024)

== Kosovo ==
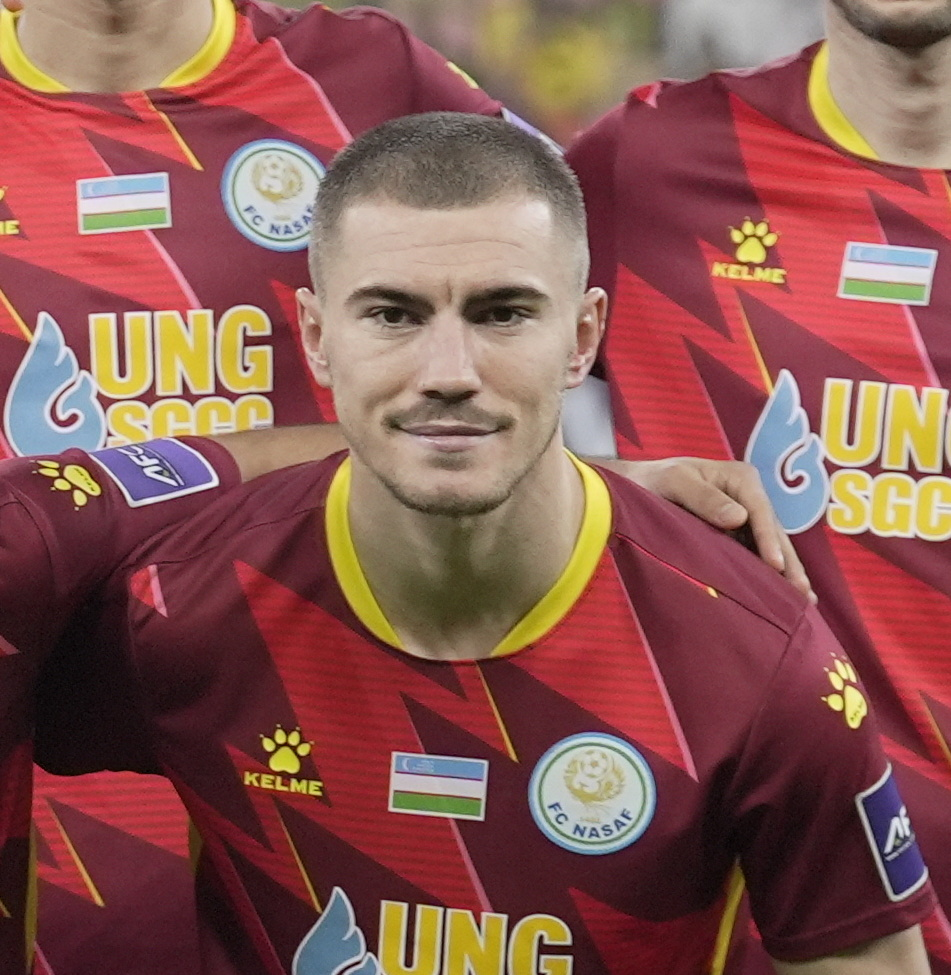
Adenis Shala with Nasaf in 2025 season

- Altin Kryeziu — Andijon (2025)
- **Adenis Shala** — Nasaf (2025 present)

== Kyrgyzstan ==
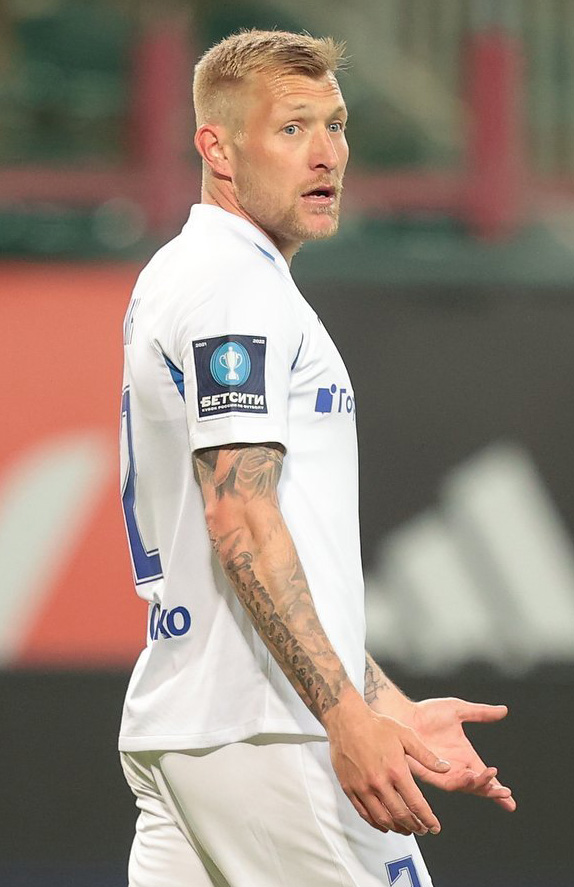
Valery Kichin with Lokomotiv in 2024 season

- Davran Babayev – Neftchi (1992) Andijon (1994–1996), Qizilqum (1997–1998), MHSK Tashkent (1998)
- Rinat Urmeev — Atlaschi (1995–1996), Kosonsoy (1997)
- Sergey Minenko — MHSK Tashkent (1996)
- Vitaly Rogovanov — MHSK Tashkent (1996)
- Karim Izrailov — Mash'al (2010), Bunyodkor (2011), Dinamo (2011), Mash'al (2012)
- Emil Kenzhesariyev — Bunyodkor (2011-2012)
- Maksim Agapov — Khorazm (2012)
- Farhat Musabekov — AGMK (2017)
- Pavel Matyash — AGMK (2018)
- Akhlidin Israilov — Andijon (2019)
- Sherzod Shakirov — Sogdiana (2019)
- Edgar Bernhardt — Andijon (2021)
- Kimi Merk — Pakhtakor (2023–2024)
- Valery Kichin — Lokomotiv (2024)
- **Joel Kojo** — Dinamo (2024), Neftchi (2025), Navbahor (2026 present)
- Erzhan Tokotayev — Andijon (2025)

== Latvia ==
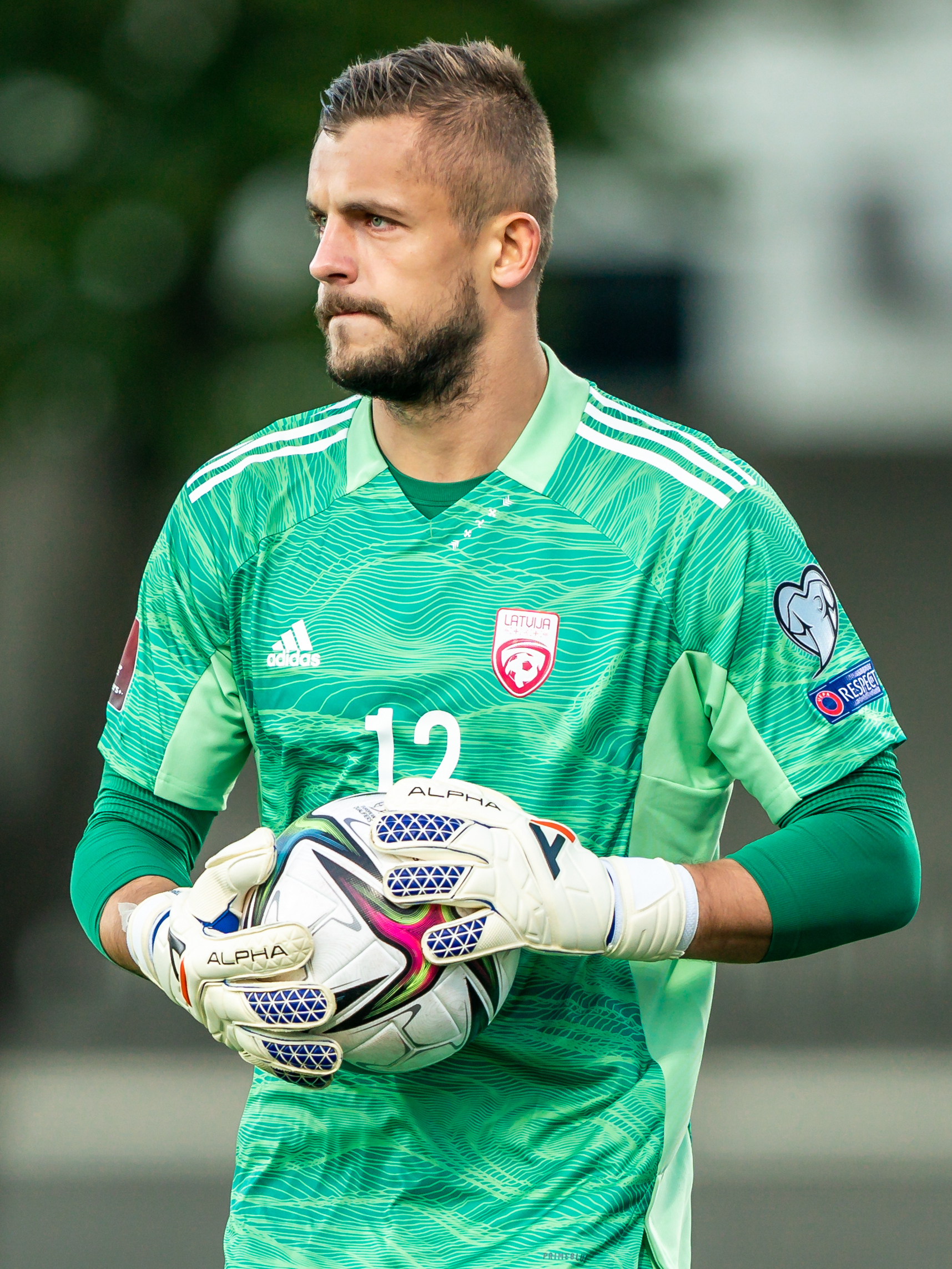
Latvia international Roberts Ozols joined Qizilqum in 2024

- Aleksandrs Glazovs — Nasaf (1999)
- Maksims Daņilovs — Qizilqum (2008)
- Pāvels Davidovs — Mash'al (2011)
- Andrejs Perepļotkins — Nasaf (2011—2012)
- Roberts Ozols — Qizilqum (2024)

== Liberia ==
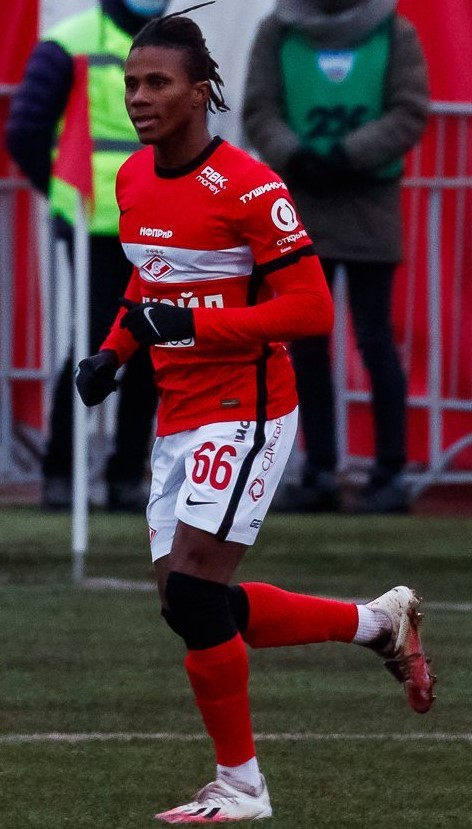
Sylvanus Nimely scored 12 goals in 26 games for Surkhon during the 2023 season

- **Sylvanus Nimely** — Surkhon (2023–2024), Neftchi (2025), Kokand 1912 (2026 present)

== Libya ==
- Mohammad Bindi Mustaffa — Lokomotiv (2012)

== Lithuania ==
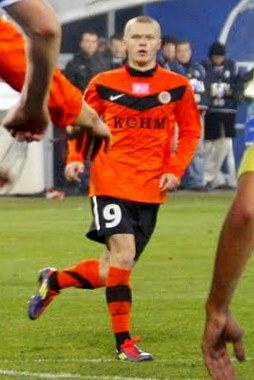
Lithuania international Darvydas Sernas joined Sogdiana in 2020

- Virginijus Baltušnikas — Pakhtakor (1991)
- Gintaras Kvitkauskas — Pakhtakor (1991)
- Tadas Grazhiunas — Bukhara (2011), Andijon (2012)
- Pavelas Leusas — Qizilqum (2011)
- Arturas Fomenka — Andijon (2008), AGMK (2008—2010), Sogdiana (2011), Bukhara (2011), Navbahor (2012), Lokomotiv (2012), Shurtan (2013)
- Egidijus Majus — Dinamo (2012)
- Gediminas Paulauskas – Dinamo (2014)
- Darvydas Šernas – Sogdiana (2018)

== Mexico ==
- Marco Bueno — Andijon (2021)

== Moldova ==
- Iurie Scala – Neftchi Fergana (1988)
- Alexei Scala – Neftchi Fergana (1988)
- Maksim Chebotar – Nasaf (2008)
- Alexandru Popovici – Andijon (2011)
- Maxim Antoniuc – Bukhara (2015)
- Oleg Bejenar – FC Nasaf (2000)
- Nikolay Minchev – Nasaf (2009)
- Gheorghe Boghiu – FC Nasaf (2010)
- Iulian Bursuc — FC Nasaf (2009)
- Anatolie Ostap — Mash'al Mubarek (2010)
- Eduard Tomaşcov — Sogdiana Jizzakh (2011)
- Constantin Mandrîcenco – FC Dinamo Samarqand (2015)
- Adrian Cașcaval – Neftchi Fergana (2015), FC AGMK (2015)
- Alexandru Melenciuc – Sogdiana Jizzakh (2011, 2013–2014), Navbahor Namangan (2015–2016)
- Alexei Casian – FK Andijon (2011)
- Denis Romanenco – Dinamo (2010), Navbahor (2011–2012)
- Alexandru Onica – Lokomotiv (2013), Neftchi Fergana (2014)
- Vitalie Plămădeală — Bukhoro (2014–2015)
- Andrei Cojocari — Lokomotiv (2014)
- Ghenadie Moșneaga – Andijon (2015)
- Denis Ilescu – Andijon (2016–2017)
- Vadim Cemirtan — FC Buxoro (2016, 2018), FC AGMK (2018), Bunyodkor (2017)
- Maxim Iurcu — Qizilqum Zarafshon (2017)
- Radu Rogac – FC Dinamo Samarqand (2017)
- Artiom Litviacov — Andijon (2020)
- Cătălin Carp — Neftchi (2024)
- **Mihail Ștefan** — Dinamo (2026 present)

== Montenegro ==
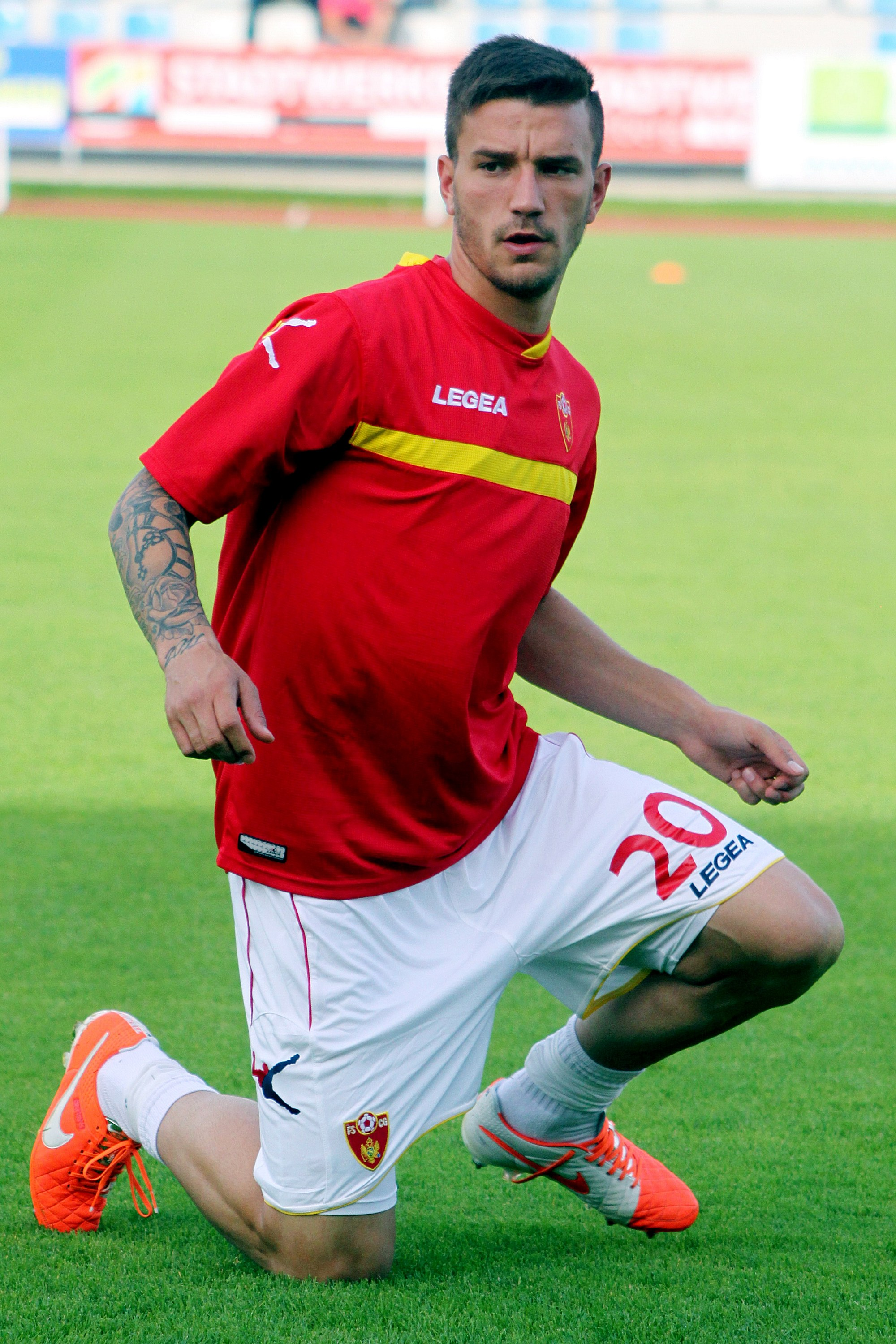
Marko Simić played 56 times and scored 6 goals in the league with Pakhtakor between 2017 and 2019

- Bojan Kaljević — Metallurg Bekabad (2008–2010, 2011–2012), Bunyodkor (2010)
- Darko Marković — Pakhtakor (2008-2011)
- Igor Petković – Mash'al Mubarek (2010–2012), FC AGMK (2012–2014)
- Predrag Vujović – Shurtan (2011), Bukhara (2014), Andijon (2015)
- Ivan Bošković — Nasaf (2011—2012)
- Sanibal Orahovac — Pakhtakor (2012)
- Damir Kojašević — Lokomotiv (2015)
- Dejan Boljević — Nasaf (2016)
- Slaven Stjepanović — Lokomotiv (2016)
- Adnan Orahovac — Pakhtakor (2015-2017) Dinamo (2017)
- Marko Simić — Pakhtakor (2017–2019)
- Darko Nikač — Navbahor (2018)
- Ivan Fatić — Bukhara (2019)
- Igor Zonjić — AGMK (2019—2020)
- Slavko Damjanović — Lokomotiv (2020)
- Marko Obradović – Metallurg Bekabad (2023)
- Oliver Sarkic — Pakhtakor Tashkent (2022)
- Goran Milojko — Andijon (2022)
- Bogdan Milić — Andijon (2022)
- Ilija Martinović — Pakhtakor (2022)
- Damjan Radulović – Sogdiana (2022)
- **Nikola Kumburović** — Turon (2023), Qizilqum (2025 present)
- Miloš Milović — Navbahor (2023)
- Igor Ivanović — Bunyodkor (2023)
- Armin Bošnjak — Andijon (2023–2024)
- Momčilo Rašo – Bunyodkor (2024)
- Marko Milićković – Metallurg (2024)
- Balša Sekulić – Metallurg (2024)
- Ivan Bulatović — Lokomotiv (2024)
- Boban Đorđević – Metallurg Bekabad (2024)
- Zoran Petrović — Sogdiana (2024)
- **Vladimir Jovović** — Sogdiana (2024), Neftchi (2025 present)
- Marko Bugarin — Bunyodkor (2025–2026)
- Miomir Đuričković — Andijon (2025)
- Luka Đorđević — Sogdiana (2025)
- Luka Uskoković — Andijon (2025)
- **Matija Krivokapić** — Bunyodkor (2025 present)
- **Vladimir Rodić** — Bukhara (2026 present)
- Aleksandar Boljević — Sogdiana (2026)
- **Drago Bumbar** — Mash'al (2026 present)

== Namibia ==
McCartney Naweseb with Qizilqum in 2020 season

- McCartney Naweseb – Qizilqum (2020)

== Netherlands ==
- Matthew Steenvoorden — Pakhtakor (2023)

== Nicaragua ==
- Ariagner Smith – Qizilqum (2019), Lokomotiv (2019)

== Niger ==
- Olivier Bonnes – Kokand 1912 (2019)

== Nigeria ==
Michael Okoro Ibe with Andijon in 2020

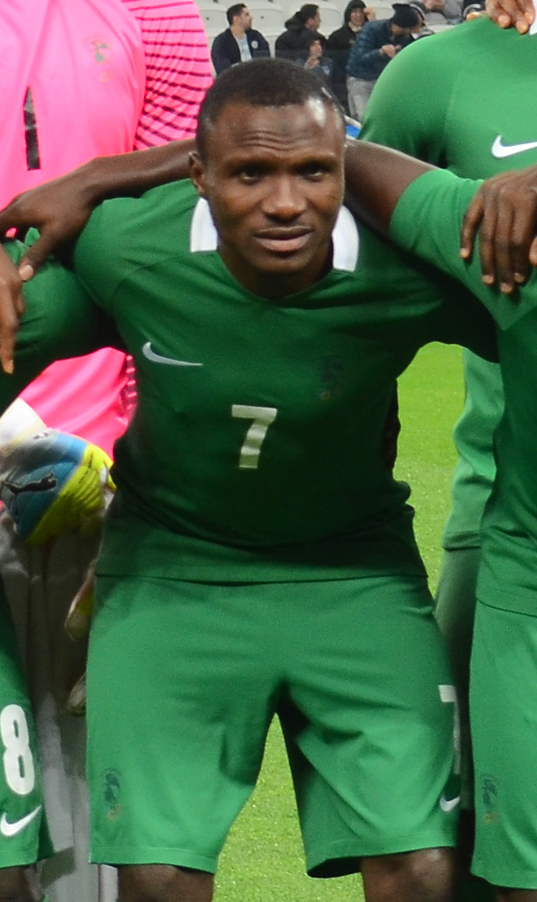
Aminu Umar, bronze medalist at the 2016 Olympics, was brought by Mash'al in 2025.

- Patrick Agbo — Navbahor (2005—2006, 2011), Quruvchi (2007), Dinamo (2008), Shurtan (2009—2010, 2011—2012)
- Uche Iheruome — Pakhtakor (2005—2010), Shurtan (2008)
- Okafor Obinna — Lokomotiv (2006)
- Benedict Opara — Bukhara (2007)
- Andre Camara Kiryuxin — Oqtepa (2007)
- David Oniya — Dinamo (2007—2011), Bunyodkor (2011), Sogdiana (2012), Bukhara (2012—2013), Neftchi (2014)
- Albert Nsofor — Bukhara (2008), Andijon (2009)
- Chidi Ebuzoemi — Sogdiana (2009)
- Martin Izokho — Dinamo, Andijon (2008-2010)
- Samuel Akanji — Shurtan (2008—2009) Qizilqum (2009—2010)
- Emmanuel Obide Okechukwu — Qizilqum (2012)
- Olabiran Muyiwa – Lokomotiv (2017)
- Ibrahim Tomiwa — Qizilqum (2020) Bunyodkor (2021–2022)
- **Ifeanyi Ifeanyi** — Mash'al (2020—2021, 2026 present) Qizilqum (2023)
- Michael Okoro Ibe — Andijon (2020), Mash'al (2020–2021)
- Emmanuel Ariwachukwu — Andijon (2020)
- Samuel Opeh — Lokomotiv (2021–2022)
- Ukeme Williams — Mash'al (2021)
- Godwin Chika Okwara — Mash'al (2021)
- Samuel Chigozie Ononiwu — Mash'al (2021)
- Paul Komolafe — Qizilqum (2022)
- Victor Mbaoma — Qizilqum (2023)
- Effiong Nsungusi — Neftchi (2024)
- **Benjamin Teidi** — Navbahor (2025 present)
- John Junior Igbarumah — Sogdiana (2025)
- Abdallah Maga — Mash'al (2025)
- **Richard Friday** — Dinamo (2025), Surkhon (2026 present)
- Aminu Umar — Mash'al (2025)
- **Yusuf Otubanjo** — Nasaf (2025 present)
- **Kingsley Sokari** — Nasaf (2025 present)
- Ismahil Akinade — Andijon (2025)
- **Stephen Chinedu** — Surkhon (2026), Pakhtakor (2026 present)
- Raphael Ayagwa — Mash'al (2026)
- **Augustine Chidi Kwem** — Mash'al (2026 present)

== North Macedonia ==
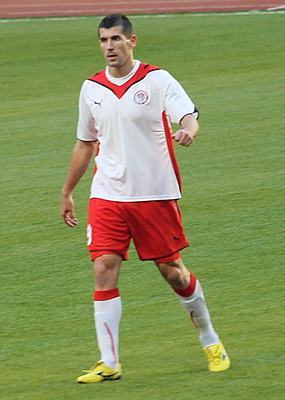
Stevica Ristić first Macedonian player.

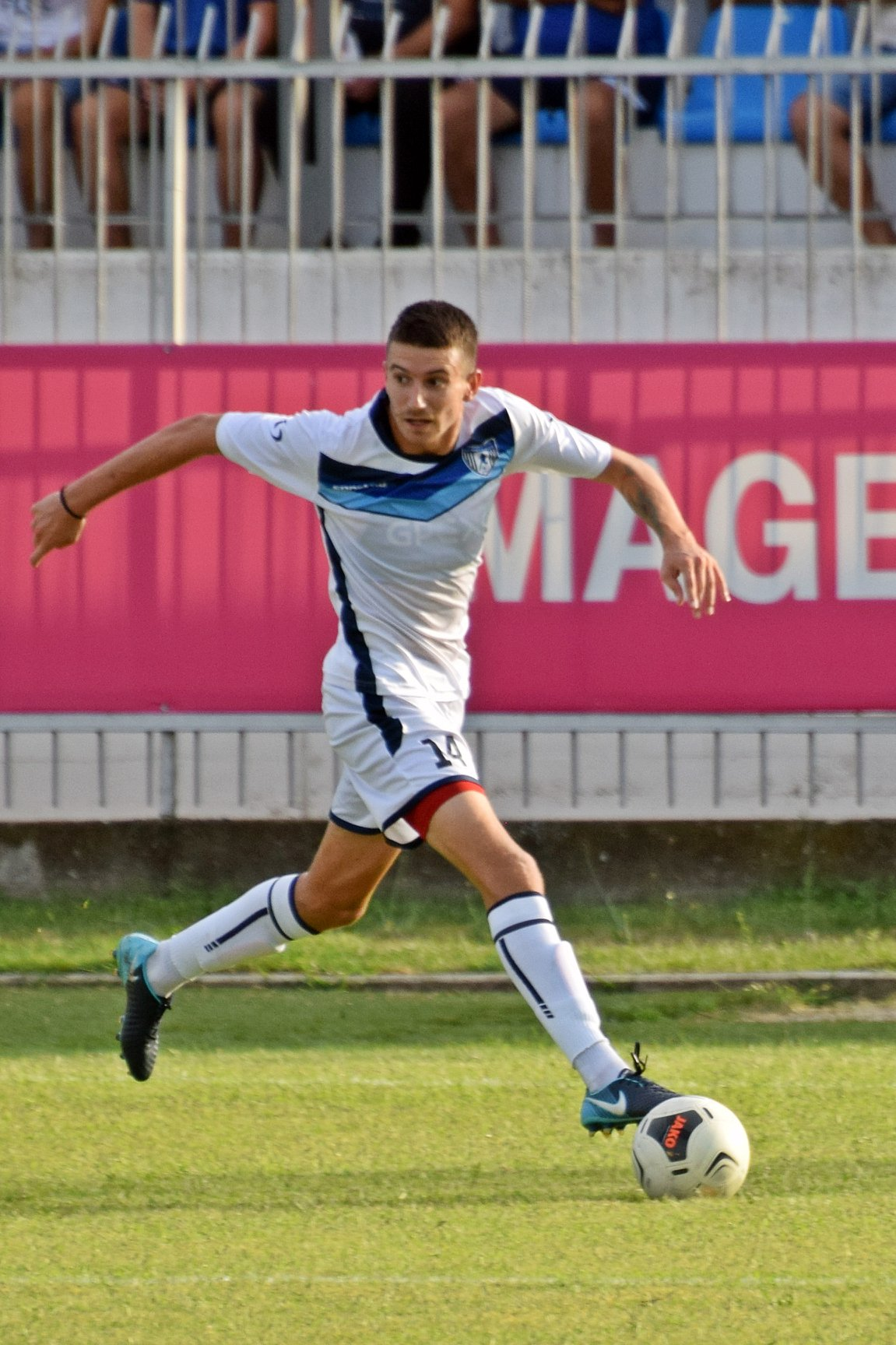
Ljupcho Doriev is the best foreign player in the Super League.

- Stevica Ristić — Bunyodkor (2010)
- Dušhan Savić — Pakhakor (2011)
- Bojan Najdenov — Navbahor (2021)
- Marko Simonovski — Qizilqum (2023)
- **Ljupcho Doriev** — Sogdiana (2023 present)
- Demir Imeri — Andijon (2024)
- **Vlatko Stojanovski** — Mash'al (2026 present)

== Poland ==
- Przemysław Banaszak — Pakhtakor (2022–2023)
- Michał Kucharczyk — Pakhtakor (2023)
- Krystian Nowak — Andijon (2025)
- Piotr Parzyszek — Pakhtakor (2026)

== Romania ==
- Petrica Ungureanu — Shurtan (2008)
- Bogdan Hauși — Bukhara (2015)
- Mihai Roman – Neftchi (2024)

== Russia ==
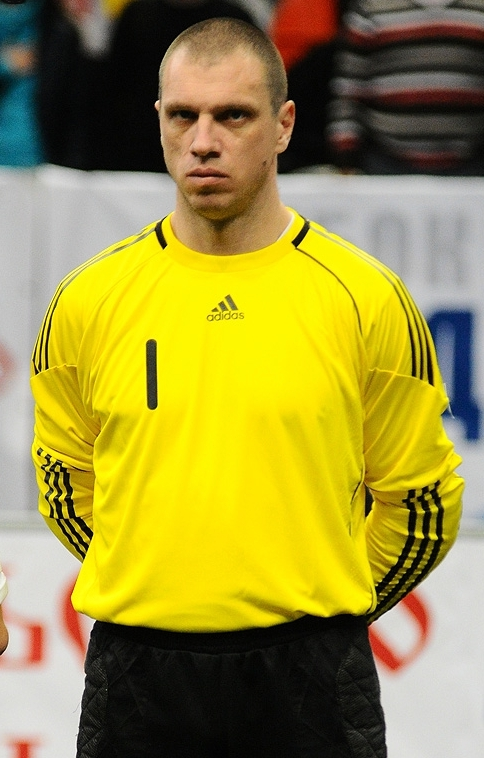
Aleksandr Filimonov played 47 games league with Lokomotiv between 2009 and 2010

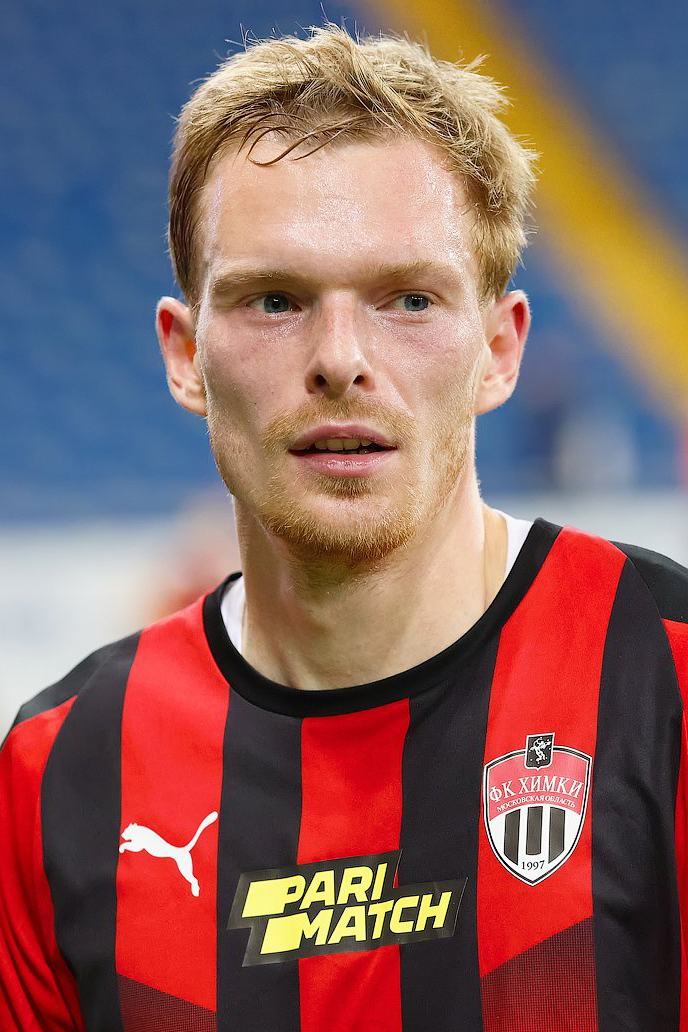
Pavel Mogilevets with Bunyodkor in 2022

- Vyacheslav Klochkov – Navbahor Namangan (1992)
- Sergei Ivanov – Navbahor Namangan (1992)
- Andrei Zaikin — Neftchi Ferghana (1992)
- Albert Tsarayev — Neftchi Ferghana (1992—1993)
- Dmitri Batynkov – Navbahor Namangan (1995–1997)
- Dmitry Bystrov – Navbahor Namangan (1995–1997)
- Andrey Afanasyev — Navbahor (1997)
- Vyacheslav Koloda – Bukhara (1998)
- Gleb Panfyorov – Dinamo Samarqand (1999)
- Nikolai Kashentsev – Bukhara (2006–2007)
- Grigori Melikov – Lokomotiv Tashkent (2006), FK Buxoro (2007, 2008–2009)
- Andrei Podolyanchik – FK Buxoro (2007)
- Aleksey Abdukhalikov – FK Buxoro (2007)
- Sergey Kuznetsov — FK Buxoro (2008), Mash'al Mubarek (2008)
- Yuriy Shelenkov – Navbahor Namangan (2009)
- Oleg Yezhurov — FK Andijan (2009)
- Aleksandr Filimonov – Lokomotiv Tashkent (2009–2010)
- Evgeniy Gogol — Lokomotiv Tashkent (2010, 2013—2014), Almalyk (2011—2013, 2015—2017)
- Vladimir Chekunov — Navbahor (2012)
- Andrey Usachev — Qizilqum (2012)
- Alan Kusov — Lokomotiv Tashkent (2013)
- Aleksandr Kovalyov – Metalourg Bekabad (2013)
- **Igor Golban** — Kokand 1912 (2014—2015), Navbahor (2016, 2019 present) Nasaf (2016)
- Vladimir Argun — Kokand 1912 (2015)
- Nikolai Pogrebnyak – Lokomotiv (2018)
- Vyacheslav Sushkin — FC Neftchi Fergana (2018)
- Andrei Shipilov — Metalourg Bekabad (2018)
- Vlad Larinov – Buxoro (2018)
- Yevgeni Cheremisin —Qizilqum (2018–2019)
- Ivan Solovyov – Navbahor (2019–2021) Nasaf (2022) Lokomotiv Tashkent (2023)
- Artyom Kulesha – Buxoro (2019)
- Dmitriy Ostrovskiy — FC Bunyodkor (2019)
- Sergei Tumasyan — Metalourg Bekabad (2019)
- Ruslan Margiev — Qizilqum Zarafshon (2019)
- Kirill Pogrebnyak — Lokomotiv Tashkent (2020)
- Oleg Tolmasov — Qizilqum Zarafshon (2020–2023)
- Ruslan Bolov – Navbahor (2020 present)
- Pavel Golyshev – Navbahor (2020)
- Sergey Morozov – Turon Yaypan (2022)
- Yevgeni Konyukhov – Neftchi Fergana (2022)
- Pavel Mogilevets – Bunyodkor (2022)
- Yevgeniy Nazarov – Dinamo Samarqand (2023)
- Nikolai Tarasov — Qizilqum Zarafshon (2023 present)
- **Artyom Potapov** – Surkhon Termez, (2023–2024, 2026 present), Khorazm (2025)
- Shamil Gasanov – Surkhon Termez (2023)
- Nodar Kavtaradze – Andijon (2023)
- Tamirlan Dzhamalutdinov – Surkhon Termez (2023, 2024)
- Luka Zgurski — Andijon (2024)
- **Dzhamaldin Khodzhaniyazov** — Surkhon Termez (2024 present)
- **Dmitry Pletnyov** — Surkhon (2024–2025), Dinamo (2025), Bunyodkor (2026 present)
- Konstantin Bazelyuk — Lokomotiv Tashkent (2024)
- Mikhail Gashchenkov — Lokomotiv Tashkent (2024)
- **Rustam Khalnazarov** — Lokomotiv Tashkent (2024 present)
- Islam Mashukov — Andijon (2025 present)
- Kirill Kolesnichenko — Surkhon (2025)
- Dmitriy Kratkov — Surkhon (2025)
- **Aleksei Kozlov** — Lokomotiv (2026 present)
- **Artem Radaev** — Dinamo (2026 present)
- **Vladislav Rusanov** — Mash'al (2026 present)

== Senegal ==
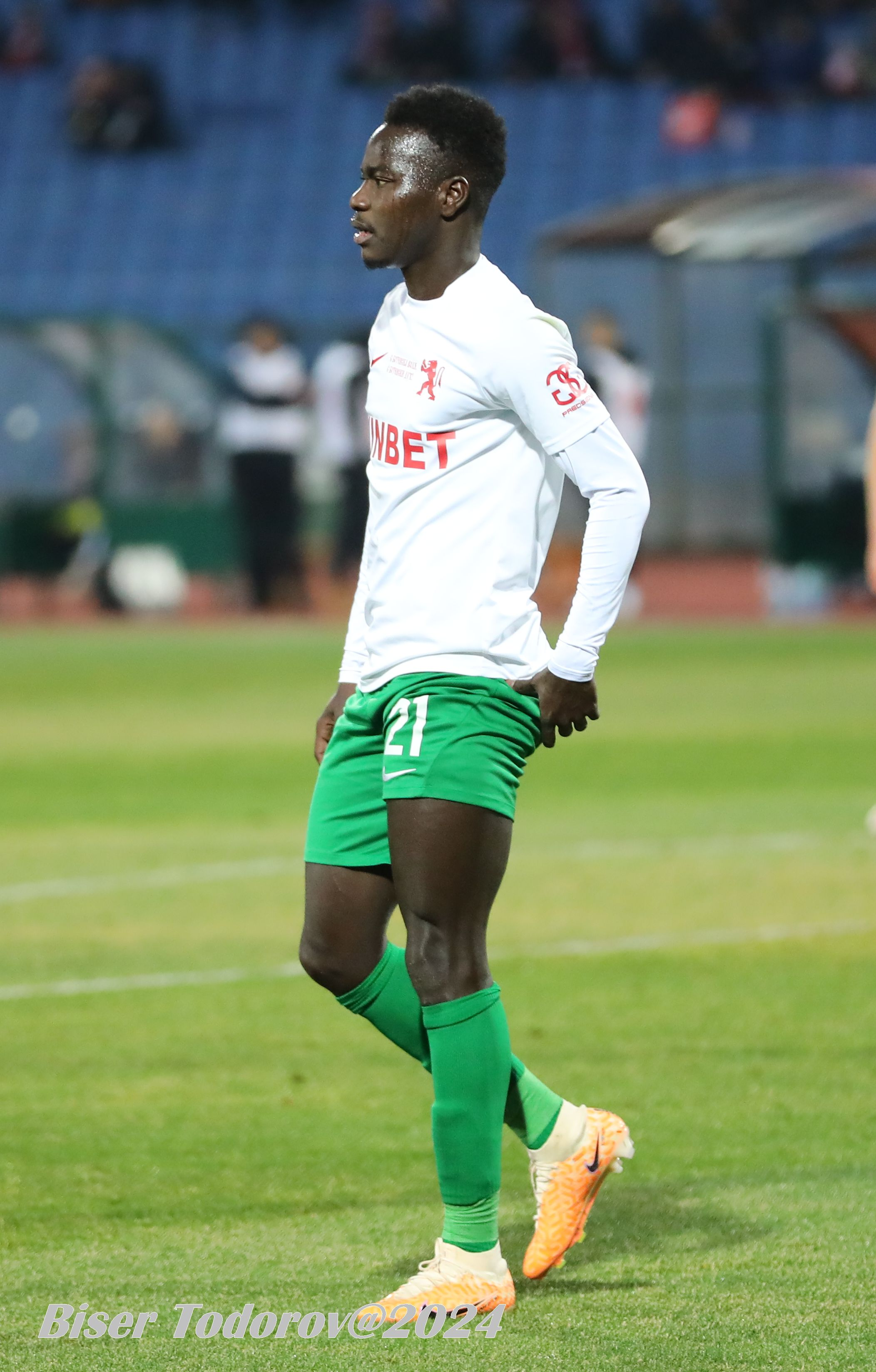
Boubacar Traorè with Khorazm in 2026 season

- Boubacar Traorè — Khorazm (2026)

== Serbia ==
Dragan Ceran is recognized as a best player of Super League six times

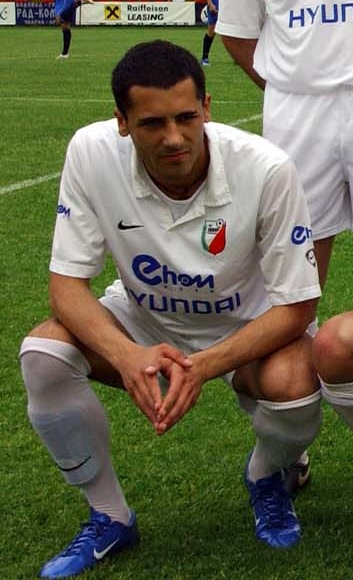
Miloš Trifunović, League goal scorer in 2011

- Miljan Priović – Traktor Tashkent (2004)
- Jelko Joksimović – Traktor Tashkent (2004)
- Vladica Ćurčić – Traktor Tashkent (2004)
- Bojan Ilić – Andijon (2009)
- Milan Nikolić – Pakhtakor (2009)
- Bojan Miladinović – Pakhtakor (2009–2014)
- Nenad Petrović – Lokomotiv (2009)
- Milorad Janjuš – Pakhtakor (2010)
- Đorđe Ivelja – Nasaf (2010)
- Vladislav Virić – Mash'al (2010)
- Aleksandar Brđanin – Mash'al (2010)
- Darko Stanojević – Mash'al (2011) AGMK (2012–2014, 2016), Shurtan (2015), Navbahor (2017–2018), Surkhon (2019–2021), Neftchi (2021–2023)
- Dragan Đurđević – Andijon (2011)
- Miloš Trifunović – Bunyodkor (2011), AGMK (2018)
- Saša Đorđević – Bunyodkor (2011)
- Uroš Milosavljević – Shurtan (2011), Bunyodkor (2011)
- Slavoljub Đorđević – Bunyodkor (2011–2012)
- Bojan Mališić – Nasaf (2011–2012)
- Milorad Resanović – Mash'al (2012)
- Aleksandar Petrović – Nasaf (2012)
- Marko Blažić – Bunyodkor (2013)
- Aleksandar Alempijević – AGMK (2014), Bunyodkor (2016)
- Ivan Milošević – Bunyodkor (2014–2015)
- Nemanja Jovanović – AGMK (2015), Andijon (2016), Qizilqum (2016, 2018), Navbahor (2017)
- Nikola Valentić – Kokand 1912 (2016–2017)
- Ognjen Krasić – Nasaf (2016)
- **Dragan Ćeran** – Nasaf (2016–2018, 2025 present) Pakhtakor (2018–2024)
- Darko Gojković – Kokand 1912 (2016–2017)
- Dušan Mićić – Bunyodkor (2017)
- Igor Jelić – AGMK (2017), Lokomotiv (2018–2019)
- Filip Rajevac – Kokand 1912 (2017, 2020), Bunyodkor (2018), Lokomotiv (2019)
- Tomislav Pajović – Navbahor (2018)
- Nenad Injac – Navbahor (2018)
- Milan Spremo – Kokand 1912 (2018)
- Marko Klisura – Bukhara (2018, 2019)
- **Milan Mitrović** – Sogdiana (2018–2025, 2026 present)
- Nikola Milinković – Sogdiana (2018–2019)
- Miloš Simonović – Sogdiana (2018)
- Marko Milić - Kokand 1912 (2018), (2019), Bukhara (2021)
- **Jovan Đokić** – AGMK (2018, 2020–2021) Lokomotiv (2019), Navbahor (2022–2024), Neftchi (2025 present)
- Vladimir Bubanja – AGMK (2018), Surkhon (2019–2020, 2021) Andijon (2022–2024) Khorazm (2025)
- Slavko Lukić – Nasaf (2018), Navbahor (2019), Kokand 1912 (2021–2022)
- Radosav Aleksić – Andijon (2019)
- Marko Zoćević – AGMK (2019)
- Miroljub Kostić – AGMK (2019)
- Bojan Knežević – Kokand 1912 (2019)
- Miloš Nikolić – Kokand 1912 (2019)
- Marko Kolaković – Sogdiana (2020–2023), Bukhara (2024–2025)
- Ivan Josović – Kokand 1912 (2020–2022), Metallurg (2023–2024)
- **Marko Stanojević** – Nasaf (2020–2024), Dinamo (2025, 2026 present)
- Nikola Tasić – Navbahor (2021)
- Marko Putinčanin – Navbahor (2021)
- Slaviša Stojanović – Navbahor (2021)
- **Bojan Ciger** – Navbahor (2021–2022) Neftchi (2024 present)
- Andrija Kaludjerović – Nasaf (2021)
- Bojan Matić – Pakhtakor (2021)
- Luka Čermelj – Sogdiana (2021–2022), Navbahor (2023)
- Darko Stanojević – Neftchi (2021), Sogdiana (2021)
- Siniša Babić – Turon (2021)
- Dajan Ponjević – Turon (2021)
- Marko Obradović – Neftchi (2021) Metallurg (2023)
- Aleksandar Ješić – Neftchi (2021–2022)
- Marko Šarić – Neftchi (2022)
- **Nikola Stošić** — Bukhara (2022–2023), Khorazm (2026 present)
- Danijel Stojković – Neftchi (2022)
- Miroslav Marković – Surkhon (2022)
- Aleksandar Stanisavljević – Qizilqum (2022), Bukhara (2023)
- **Zoran Marušić** – Navbahor (2022), Nasaf (2024), Neftchi (2025 present)
- Dimitrije Pobulić – Bunyodkor (2022)
- Mihailo Jovanović – Dinamo (2022)
- Miloje Preković – Dinamo (2022)
- Alen Mašović – Nasaf (2022), Qizilqum (2025)
- Milan Marčić — Bunyodkor (2023)
- Filip Stamenković — Metallurg (2023)
- Dušan Stoiljković — Turon (2023)
- Milan Bojović — Turon (2023)
- **Filip Ivanović** — Navbahor (2023–2024), Sogdiana (2025 present)
- Miljan Škrbić — AGMK (2024)
- Ljubiša Pecelj — Andijon (2024)
- Damjan Krajišnik — Lokomotiv (2024)
- Ivan Rogač — Lokomotiv (2024)
- Stefan Čolović — Nasaf (2024–2025)
- Dušan Mijić — Dinamo (2024–2025), Qizilqum (2025)
- Milan Mirosavljev — Bukhara (2024)
- **Bojan Mlađović** — Bukhara (2026 present)
- **Veljko Filipović** — Bukhara (2026 present)
- **Vanja Ilić** — Navbahor (2026 present)
- Nikola Mirković — Sogdiana (2026)
- Fejsal Mulić — Sogdiana (2026)
- **Uros Kojic** — AGMK (2026 present)
- **Nemanja Ćalasan** — Andijon (2026 present)
- **Petar Mićin** — Sogdiana (2026 present)
- **Strahinja Bošnjak** — Mash'al (2026 present)
- **Luka Ratkovic** — Qizilqum (2026 present)

== Slovakia ==
- Marián Dirnbach — Nasaf (2008)
- Jan Kozak — Bunyodkor (2012)

== Slovenia ==
- Rok Roj — Nasaf (2015—2016)
- Til Mavretič — Dinamo (2026)
- **Matija Rom** — Khorazm (2026 present)

== Spain ==
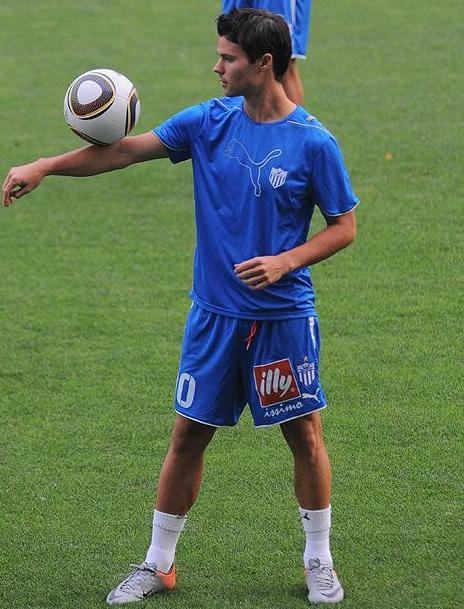
Carles Coto, first Spain player

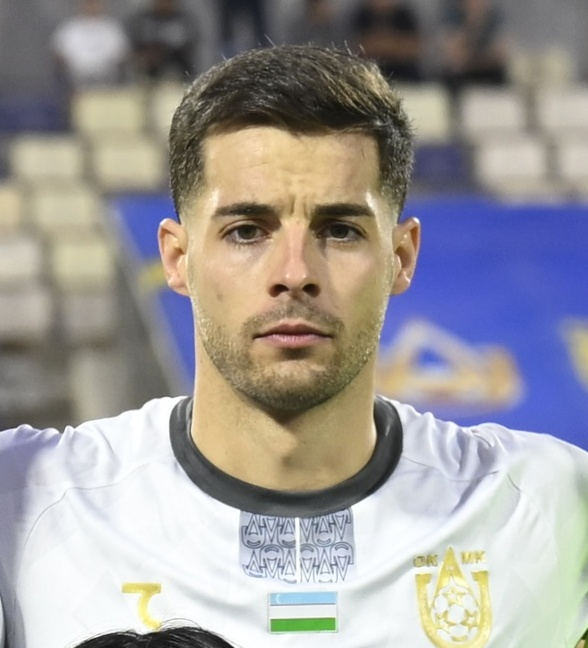
Rubén Sánchez played 57 times and scored 13 goals in the league with AGMK between 2023 and 2025

- Carles Coto — Bunyodkor (2014)
- Diego Bardanca — Lokomotiv (2021)
- Sergio Rodríguez — Surkhon (2022)
- Javi Jiménez — Surkhon (2022)
- Rubén Sánchez — Surkhon (2022), AGMK (2023–2025)
- Manel Martínez — Surkhon (2022)

== South Korea ==
- Choi Hyun-yeon — Navbahor (2016)
- Cho Seok-jae — Lokomotiv (2018)
- Kim Dong-hee — Sogdiana (2018)
- Kim Bo-yong — Turon (2021—2022)

== South Sudan ==
- Valentino Yuel — Nasaf (2024)
- Ajak Riak — AGMK (2025)

== Switzerland ==
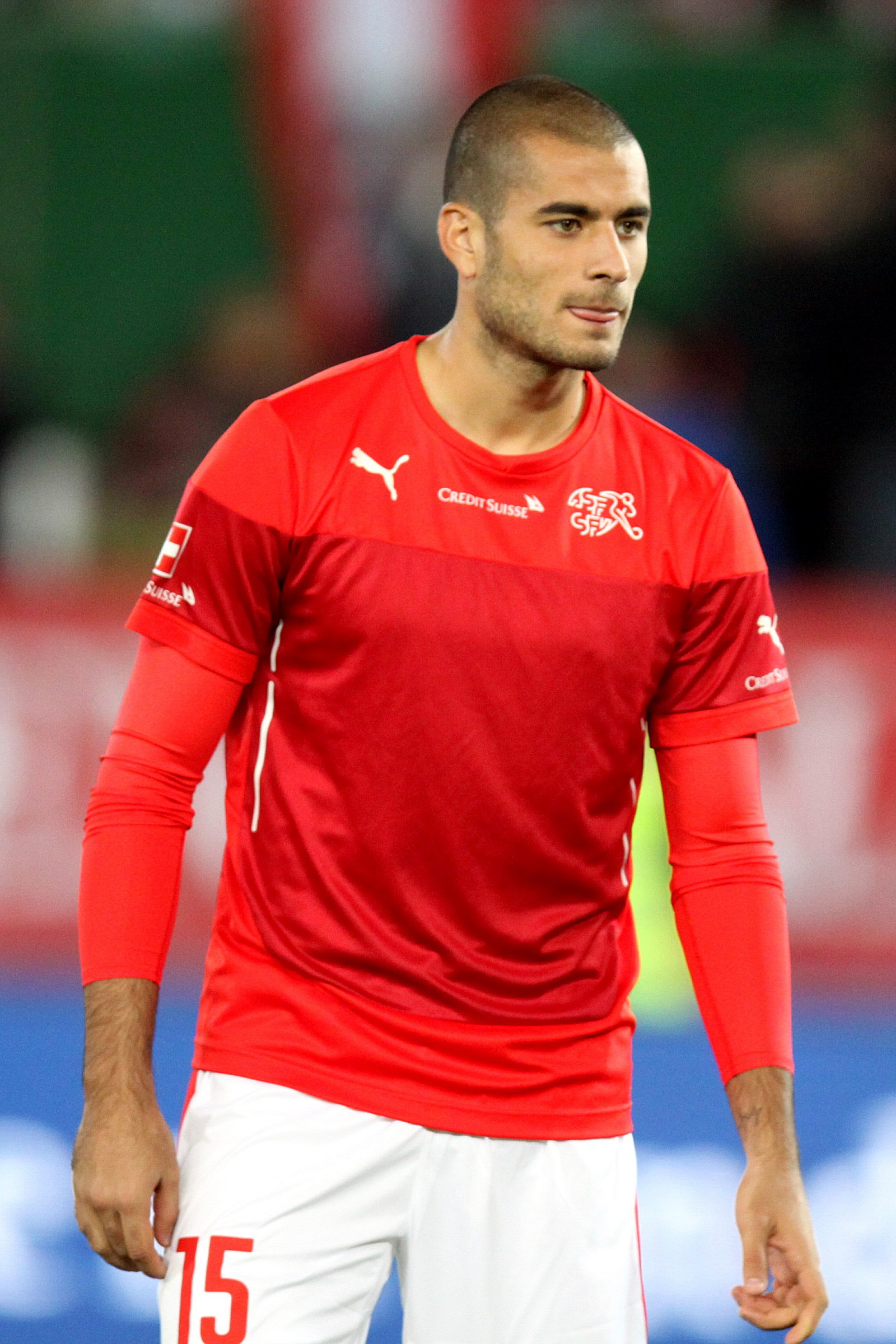
Eren Derdiyok won the 2020 season title with Pakhtakor

- Eren Derdiyok — Pakhtakor (2020–2021)

== Syria ==
- Maksim Sarraf — Andijon (2024)

== Tajikistan ==
- Valeriy Gorbach — Bukhara (1991)
- Tokhirjon Muminov — FC Andijon (1996—1998, 2000—2002)
- Akmal Kholmatov — Neftchi Ferghana (1996—2008, 2014—2016), Pakhtakor (2008—2010), Lokomotiv Tashkent (2012—2014), Shurtan (2017), Andijan (2017)
- Alisher Tuychiev — Yangiyer (1996, 1999), Nasaf (1997-1999), Guliston (2000), Mashal (2002), Metallurg Bekabad (2008—2009)
- Shuhrat Jabborov — Soghdiana (1998—1999), Dinamo Samarkand (2000—2002, 2003—2004)
- Mukhsin Mukhamadiev — Bukhara (1999), Dinamo Samarkand (2000—2001)
- Farhod Tohirov — Andijan (2012)
- Umedzhon Sharipov — Mash'al Mubarek (2017)
- Jahongir Aliev — Nasaf (2018)
- Zoir Juraboev – Metallurg Bekabad (2018)
- Fatkhullo Fatkhuloev — FK Buxoro (2019)
- Amirbek Juraboev — Navbahor Namangan (2019–2020)
- Davron Ergashev — FC Bunyodkor (2020)

== Tunisia ==
- Chaker Zouaghi — AGMK (2014), Bunyodkor (2015—2016)
- Mohamad Salem — AGMK (2023)

== Turkmenistan ==
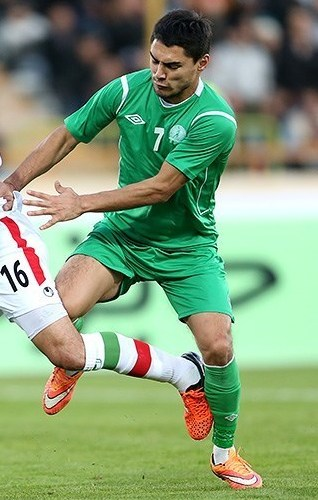
Arslanmyrat Amanow has played for FC AGMK, Bukhara, Lokomotiv and Sogdiana in the Uzbekistan Super League

- Kakha Gogoladze – FC Nasaf (1998)
- Artyom Nikitenko - Olmaliq FK
- Amir Gurbani - FK Buxoro
- Maksim Kazankov- - Lokomotiv Tashkent
- Maksim Belyh – Navbahor Namangan
- Konstantin Sosenko — Pakhtakor (2000—2001)
- Didar Hajiyev — Navbahor (2005—2009), Nasaf (2010)
- Guwançmuhammet Öwekow – Navbahor (2005–2006)
- Dayanklych Orazov — Neftchi Ferghana (2006), Soghdiana (2006, 2008)
- Artur Gevorkyan — Shurtan (2006—2009), Pakhtakor (2010), Nasaf (2011—2016), Lokomotiv Tashkent (2016), Qizilqum(2017-2018)
- Murat Hamrayev — Dinamo Samarkand (2007—2008), Almalyk (2009, 2010—2011)
- Nazar Choliyev — Almalyk (2008)
- Bahtiýar Hojaahmedow — Bukhara (2010)
- Pavel Harchik — Qizilqum (2011), Almalyk (2012)
- Alik Haydarov — Mashal (2011—2013)
- Maksatmurat Shamuradov — Almalyk (2013—2014)
- Elman Tagayev — Andijan (2016) Navbahor Namangan (2019)
- Arslanmyrat Amanow – FC AGMK (2015–2016, 2020) FC Buxoro (2018) Lokomotiv (2019)
- Selim Nurmyradow — FC Bunyodkor (2020)
- Abdy Bäşimow — Qizilqum Zarafshon (2020)
- Wezirgeldi Ylýasow — Qizilqum Zarafshon (2020)
- Didar Durdyýew — FK Mash'al Mubarek (2020)

== Ukraine ==
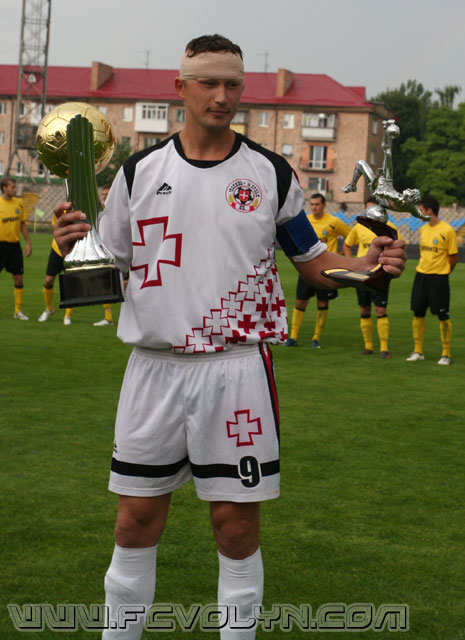
Oleksandr Pyshchur, League goal scorer in 2013

- Sefer Alibaev — Navbahor Namangan (1988—1991), Traktor Tashkent (1996), FK Samarqand-Dinamo (1997)
- Yuriy Yaroshenko — Navbahor Namangan (1993)
- Igor Taran — FC Dustlik (1998)
- Vladislav Lyutiy — FC Pakhtakor Tashkent (2001)
- Sergey Mayborada — FC Pakhtakor Tashkent (2001)
- Aleksandr Kundenok — Navbahor Namangan (2003)
- Serhiy Yesin — Navbahor Namangan (2003)
- Andrey Oparin — Navbahor Namangan (2004)
- Oleksandr Tkachuk — Qizilqum Zarafshon (2008—2009)
- Mykola Pavlenko — FC Nasaf (2008—2009)
- Anatoliy Matkevych — FC Nasaf (2008)
- Oleh Mochulyak — FK Buxoro (2008)
- Nikolay Guryanov – Lokomotiv Tashkent (2010)
- Aleksandr Pozdeev — FC AGMK (2010)
- Denys Yershov — FC AGMK (2010)
- Anton Lysyuk — FC Qizilqum (2010)
- Oleksandr Dyndikov — FC AGMK (2010), Dinamo (2010)
- Serhiy Datsenko — Dinamo (2010)
- Andrei Jakovlev — FC Nasaf (2010)
- Dmytro Kozachenko — FC Nasaf (2010)
- Andrei Khodykin — Mash'al Mubarek (2011)
- Andrey Melnichuk — Qizilqum Zarafshon (2010—2011), FK Samarqand-Dinamo (2011—2015)
- Sergey Litovchenko — Lokomotiv Tashkent (2010)
- Andriy Yakovlyev — FC Nasaf (2010)
- Oleksiy Khramtsov — Navbahor Namangan (2010)
- Yuriy Tselykh — Navbahor Namangan (2010), FK Andijan (2011)
- Dmytro Kolodin — Qizilqum Zarafshon (2010)
- Roman Pasichnichenko —Qizilqum Zarafshon (2011)
- Dmytro Kozachenko — FC Nasaf (2011)
- Oleksandr Polovkov – FK Andijan (2012)
- Andrey Yerokhin – FK Samarqand-Dinamo (2012)
- Andrey Sirotyuk – Metalourg Bekabad (2012)
- Oleksandar Tarasenko – FK Buxoro (2012)
- Ihor Tymchenko — Lokomotiv Tashkent (2013)
- Volodymyr Kilikevych — FK Samarqand-Dinamo (2013), FK Buxoro (2013)
- Oleksandr Pyschur – FC Bunyodkor (2013—2014), Navbahor Namangan (2016), FC Shurtan Guzar (2017)
- Vyacheslav Shevchenko — Lokomotiv Tashkent (2014), Qizilqum Zarafshon (2015—2017)
- Ruslan Kachur — Navbahor Namangan (2014)
- Serhiy Symonenko — FC Bunyodkor (2014)
- Oleksandr Kablash — Sogdiana Jizzakh (2014), Navbahor Namangan (2015)
- Yaroslav Martynyuk — FC AGMK (2016)
- Andriy Derkach – Mash'al Mubarek (2016), Qizilqum (2017)
- Vladyslav Pavlenko – Mash'al Mubarek (2017)
- Vitaliy Mirnyi – Neftchi Fergana (2018), FC Andijon (2019)
- Yevhen Chumak – FC Bunyodkor (2019), Metallurg Bekabad (2020 present), Dinamo Samarqand (2022 present)
- Oleksandr Kasyan – Navbahor (2019), Surkhon Termez (2020 present), FC AGMK (2022 present)
- Volodymyr Bayenko – FC Buxoro (2017), (2019)
- Dmytro Zozulya – FC Andijon (2020)
- Artem Baranovskyi – FC Buxoro (2020)
- Denys Vasilyev — Mash'al Mubarek (2020)
- Mykhaylo Udod – Dinamo Samarqand (2021)
- Oleh Marchuk – Dinamo Samarqand (2021), FK Buxoro (2022 present)
- Dmytro Sydorenko – Dinamo Samarqand (2021), FK Buxoro (2022 present)
- Oleksiy Larin — Pakhtakor Tashkent (2022)
- Andriy Mishchenko — AGMK (2022 present)
- Rizvan Ablitarov — FK Buxoro (2022)

== United States ==
- Graham Smith – AGMK (2016–2017)

== Uruguay ==
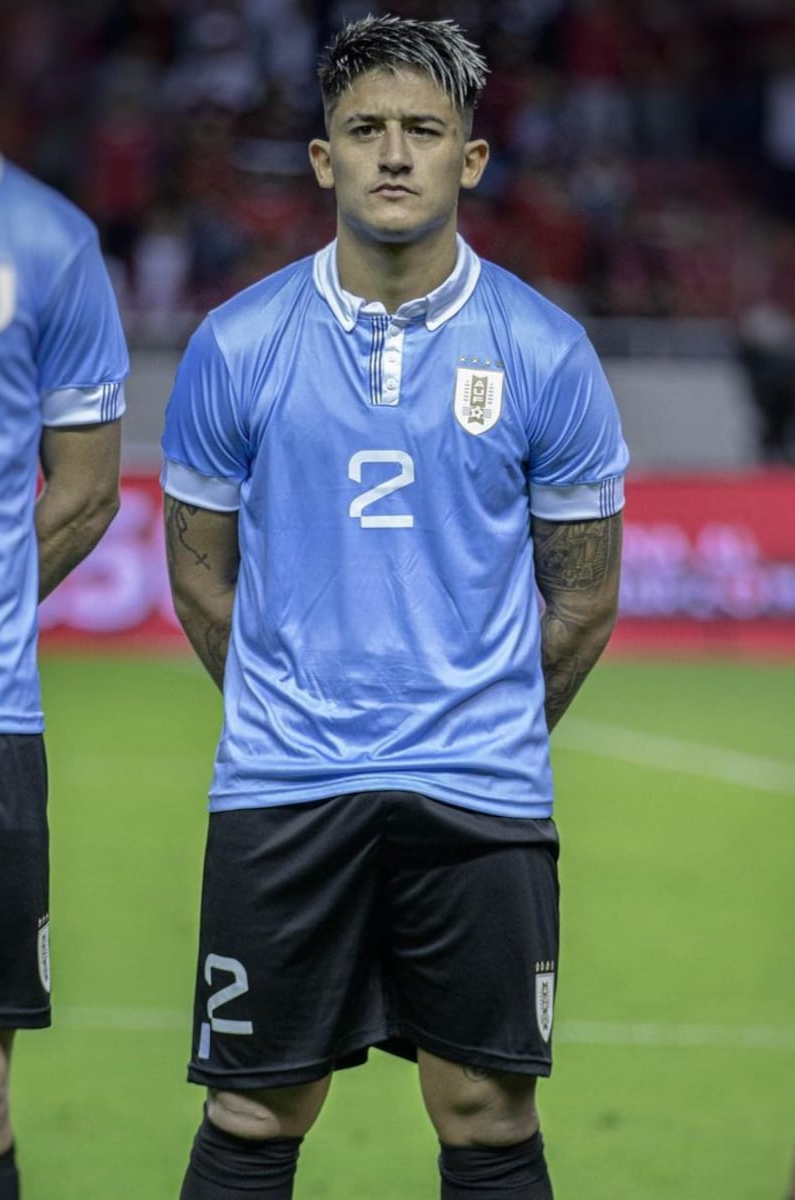
Uruguay national Mauro Brasil joined Dinamo in 2026

- Mauro Brasil — Dinamo Samarqand (2026)

== Notes ==
1. Born in Belgium
2. Born in Bosnia and Herzegovina
3. Born in Brazil
4. Born in Burkina Faso
5. Born in Cameroon
6. Born in England
7. Born in Ghana
8. Born in Germany
9. Born in Italy
10. Born in Ivory Coast
11. Born in Kenya
12. Born in Libya
13. Born in Montenegro
14. Born in Netherlands
15. Born in Niger
16. Born in Russia
17. Born in Serbia
18. Born in Slovenia
19. Born in Spain
20. Born in Tajikistan
21. Born in Uzbekistan
22. Capped for the Ghana national under-18 football team
23. Capped for the Portugal national under-17 football team

== See also ==
- 2026 Uzbekistan Super League
- 2026 Uzbekistan Pro League
- List of foreign football players in Uzbekistan Pro League
