= Zaika (surname) =

Zaika or Zayka (Russian: Заика or Зайка) are transliterations of gender-neutral Russian surnames originating either from the noun заика (stammerer), which may be transliterated as 'Zaika' or Zayika or зайка (leveret, i.e., baby hare), which may be transliterated as 'Zayka' or 'Zaika'. Notable people with the surname include:

- Ilia Zaika (born 2002), Russian artistic gymnast
- Kirill Zaika (born 1992), Russian football player
- Mikhail Zaika (born 1981), Russian serial killer
- Serhiy Zayika birth name of Serhiy Semenyuk (born 1991), Ukrainian footballer
- Yakov Zayka (born 1991), Russian football player

== See also ==
- List of people known as the Stammerer
- Zaikin
