= Zaikin =

Zaikin (Russian: Заикин, IPA: [zɐˈikʲɪn]; male) or Zaikina (female) is a Russian surname meaning literally "stutterer's (son)". Notable people with the surname include:

- Aleksandr Vladimirovich Zaikin (born 1988), Russian footballer
- Aleksandr Yevgenyevich Zaikin (born 1974), Russian footballer
- Andrei Zaikin, Russian footballer
- Dmitry Zaikin (1932-2013), Russian cosmonaut trainer
- Andrei Zaikin, Russian footballer
- Yana Zaikina (born 2011), Russian rhythmic gymnast

== See slso ==
- Zaika (surname)
