= List of foreign football players in Uzbekistan Pro League =

This is a list of foreign players who play in the Uzbekistan Pro League in the season 2026. The following players have been born outside Uzbekistan and have not been capped for the Uzbek national team at any level. From season 2026 there is a limit on foreign players 5.

In bold: players who have played at least one Pro League game in the current season (2026), and are still at a club for which they have played. This does not include current players of a Pro League club who have not played a Pro League game in the current season.

Details correct as of 11 March 2026

== Belarus ==
- Yaroslav Makushinsky — Bukhara (2024)
- **Roman Vegerya** — Shurtan (2026 present)

== Bosnia and Herzegovina ==
- Dominik Begić — Bukhara (2024)

== Brazil ==
- Guiherme Carvalho da Silva — Oqtepa (2021)
- **Maxuel Cássio** — Metallurg (2026 present)
- **Isac Martins Silva** — Kattakurgan (2026 present)

== Burkina Faso ==
- Faysal Traoré — Yangiyer (2021)

== Cameroon ==
- Landry Nzimen Chamedjeu — Yangiyer (2021)
- Jerome Mpasko Etame — Yangiyer (2021)
- Mbeke Siebatcheu — Yangiyer (2021)
- Emmanuel Riccardo — Gijduvan (2022)
- Rokki Marsiano — Khorazm (2022)
- Neville Tengeg — Khorazm (2023)

== Colombia ==
- Juan Estevan Becerra Ospina — Oqtepa (2021), Gijduvan (2021–2022)

== Croatia ==
- Šime Žužul — Lokomotiv (2023)
- Frane Ikić — Bukhara (2024)

== Ghana ==
- **Francis Narh** — Dinamo (2023), Kattakurgan (2026 present)
- Derrick Mensah — Dinamo (2023)

== Georgia ==
- Akaki Shulaia — Lokomotiv (2025)

== Iran ==
- Amirhossein Reyvandi — Bukhara (2024)

== Ivory Coast ==
- **Muhamed Olawale** — Shurtan (2026 present)

== Japan ==
- Yudai Koike — Dinamo (2023)

== Kazakhstan ==
- Abdumutal Zholdasov — Lokomotiv (2011)

== Kyrgyzstan ==
- Joel Kojo – Dinamo (2023)

== Mali ==
- Issa Diamoutene — Khorazm (2024)

== Montenegro ==
- Marko Obradović – Neftchi (2021)
- Goran Milojko — Andijon (2022)
- Bogdan Milić — Andijon (2022)
- Momčilo Rašo — Lokomotiv (2025)
- **Armin Bosnjak** — Metallurg (2026 present)

== Nigeria ==
- Eric Abanda — Oqtepa (2006)
- Andre Camara Kiryuxin — Oqtepa (2007)
- Alex Ojiaka — Lokomotiv (2011)
- Ibrahim Tomiwa — Oqtepa (2020)
- Long Ji Song — Oqtepa (2021), Gijduvon (2021–2022)
- Samuel Opeh — Oqtepa (2021), Lokomotiv (2023)
- Eric Abanda — Oqtepa (2006)
- Samuel Chigozie Ononiwu — Mash'al (2024)
- Michael Babatunde — Mash'al (2024)

== North Macedonia ==
- Xhelil Asani – Mash'al (2018)
- Bojan Najdenov — Lokomotiv (2023)

== Senegal ==
- Secouba Diatta – Yangiyer (2022)

== Russia ==
- Siyovush Khabibulloev — Turon (2022)
- Sergey Morozov — Turon (2022)
- Ivan Solovyov — Lokomotiv (2023)
- Evgeniy Nazarov — Dinamo (2023)
- **Mark Krasnov** — Aral (2026 present)
- **Yuriy Klochkov** — Shurtan (2026 present)
- **Vladislav Nabatov** — Gazalkent (2026 present)
- **Ivan Korshunov** — Gazalkent (2026 present)
- **Timofey Postnikov** — Gazalkent (2026 present)

== Serbia ==
- Nenad Petrović — Lokomotiv (2011)
- Marko Milić — Bukhara (2021)
- Darko Stanojević (born 1987) — Neftchi (2021)
- Darko Stanojević (born 1997) — Neftchi (2021)
- Aleksandar Ješić — Neftchi (2021)
- **Vladimir Bubanja** — Andijon (2022), Metallurg (2026 present)
- Nikola Stošić — Bukhara (2022)
- Dušan Mijić — Dinamo (2023)
- Milan Mirosavljev — Bukhara (2024)
- Marko Kolaković — Bukhara (2024)
- Nikola Popović — Lokomotiv (2025)
- **Branimir Jočić** — Metallurg (2026 present)

== Slovenia ==
- **Almin Kurtović** — Kattakurgan (2026 present)

== South Korea ==
- Kim Bo-yong — Turon (2022)

== Tajikistan ==
- Tohir Malodustov — Bukhara (2021)
- Sharifbek Rakhmatov — Turon (2022)
- Rustam Soirov — Lokomotiv (2023)
- Manuchehr Safarov — Lokomotiv (2023)

== Turkmenistan ==
- Yusup Orazmammedov — Lokomotiv (2011)
- Rahat Japarov — Bukhara (2023)
- **Vepa Jumayev** — Aral (2026 present)

== Ukraine ==
- Oleg Marchuk — Dinamo (2021), Bukhara (2022)
- Dmytro Sydorenko — Dinamo (2021), Bukhara (2022)
- Mykhaylo Udod — Dinamo (2021)
- Sergey Molochko — Mash'al (2022)
- Mykola Ahapov — Mash'al (2022)
- Rizvan Ablitarov — Bukhara (2022)
- Serhiy Petrov — Mash'al (2023), Kokand 1912 (2024)
- Yegor Kondratyuk — Kokand 1912 (2024)
- Levan Arveladze — Lokomotiv (2025)

== See also ==
- 2026 Uzbekistan Pro League
- List of foreign football players in Uzbekistan Super League
