= Mikhail Zaika =

Russian serial killer

- Born: Mikhail Sergeyevich Zaika; 18 February 1981 (age 45); Moscow, Moscow Oblast, RSFSR
- Other names: "The Soul Collector" "The Satanist" "The Chemist" "The Pharmacist" "Brezhnev" "DiCaprio"
- Conviction: N/A (Unfit to stand trial)
- Penalty: Involuntary commitment

Details
- Victims: 4+
- Span of crimes: 1997–1999
- Country: Russia
- States: Saint Petersburg, Vladimir
- Date apprehended: 14 July 1999

Mikhail Sergeyevich Zaika (Russian: Михаил Сергеевич Заика; born 18 February 1981), known as The Soul Collector (Russian: Собиратель душ), is a Russian serial killer who, together with accomplice Evgeny Kondrashov (Russian: Евгений Кондрашов; born 1978), committed at least four murders in Saint Petersburg and Suzdal from 1997 to 1999. He was charged with the crimes, but acquitted by reason of insanity and ordered to undergo psychiatric treatment.

After spending 20 years in treatment, Zaika was released and became an advocate for people with mental health issues. His case is considered notable for being a documented case of a serial killer being rehabilitated and re-adapting into society.

== Early life ==
Mikhail Zaika was born on 18 February 1981 in Moscow. His father abandoned the family early in life, after which his mother took the young boy and his sister to Saint Petersburg. While at school, Zaika was noted for being very intelligent and interested in various topics such as chemistry, medicine, politics, philosophy and religion, earning him a variety of nicknames among friends and acquaintances – "Brezhnev", "Satanist", "Pharmacist" and "Chemist". In addition, Zaika was considered attractive among the female students, who nicknamed him "DiCaprio" after the famous American actor.

=== Mental illness and drug manufacturing ===
At the beginning of 1995, Zaika began to show signs of a mental illness and various eccentricities, which eventually led to him being placed in a psychiatric hospital for treatment. After several months of treatment, he was diagnosed with schizophrenia and given medication for it.

Following his release, Zaika lost interest in studying, dropped out of school and began living a criminal lifestyle. Using his skills as a chemist, Zaika decided to earn a living by synthesizing various types of drugs and poisonous substances, but did not have the means to do so. In late 1995, he, together with 16-year-old Artur Erium and some other friends, began producing homemade drugs in the form of pills inside an apartment. In his free time, Zaika conducted various chemical experiments, making extracts from plants and testing them on himself in an effort to make a new drug.

At around this time, Zaika befriended 20-year-old Vladislav Kudryavtsev. Similarly to his younger friend, Kudryavtsev was fond of yoga, philosophy, the occult and National Socialism. The pair lived in the same neighborhood and worked together in the drug lab, all the while lying to their parents and acquaintances that they were part of a band. Kudryavtsev was also noted for his drug abuse and sadistic tendencies.

== Murders ==
=== Drug murders ===
In the autumn of 1997, Kudryavtsev's brother was arrested on charges of robbery. The prosecution's main witness was a man named Boris Andrushchenko, and after somehow learning of his identity, Zaika suggested to Kudryavtsev that they kill him. On 5 September, Zaika lured Andrushchenko to the Kolomyagi district under the guise of selling him heroin, to which the man agreed. He then injected Andrushchenko with a paralytic drug he claimed to be heroin, rendering the victim unable to move. After watching his reaction to the drug for a couple of minutes, Zaika took out a knife and slit Andrushchenko's throat. On the following day, Zaika doused the body with gasoline and burned it.

In the spring of 1998, the police uncovered Zaika and Erium's clandestine drug lab and arrested both of them. However, since Zaika was a minor and recognized as mentally ill, no charges were pressed against him. Meanwhile, Erium was sent to a psychiatric hospital, while the remaining defendants were either imprisoned or granted immunity for cooperating with the authorities. Zaika became convinced that the police were tipped off by a member of their group, a certain Borisov, who was secretly a police informant. Zaika lured Borisov to an isolated area, where he snuck up behind him and hit him on the head with a rock. Once Borisov fell unconscious to the ground, Zaika stabbed him to death.

=== Meeting Evgeny Kondrashov ===
In early 1999, Zaika was hanging out a nightclub called "Jungle" where he met 21-year-old Evgeny Kondrashov. A native of Murmansk Oblast, he was drafted into the Russian Armed Forces, but went AWOL after suffering beatings from older servicemen and returned to his parents' house. However, his father – a naval officer – took him to the police, where Kondrashov was sent for further training in a disciplinary battalion.

Upon being demobilized in 1998, Kondrashov initially returned to his parents' house, but soon left for Saint Petersburg after getting into an argument with his father. After this, he spent some time working as a manual laborer before turning to male prostitution. In August 1998, Kondrashov was at a café called "Vodoley", where he met 43-year-old Alexander Oshurkov, a gay man who offered to house the young man at his apartment on Maly Prospekt. Kondrashov agreed, and befriending Zaika, the younger man began spending a lot of time in his company.

=== Ritualistic murders ===
Sometime after this, both Zaika and Kondrashov became obsessed with neo-paganism and started conducting rituals with sacrifices. In order to improve their knowledge on the subject, the pair read many books, eventually subscribing to the philosophy that Satan could be interpreted as a symbol of power and freedom. Shortly afterwards, the pair decided to start committing murders together.

The pair's first victim would be 17-year-old Valery Vasiliev, another young gay man who lived at Oshurkov's apartment. Vasiliev ran away from his parents due to their poor lifestyle, was previously arrested by police and had undergone treatment at a psychiatric hospital for injuries sustained to his head. On 5 May 1999, Zaika and Kondrashov lured Vasiliev to the village of Kamenka, where, near an abandoned substation building, Kondrashov struck him several times with a stick before Zaika injected him with a paralytic drug. After observing his reaction to the drug, the pair cut a flap of skin from Vasiliev's neck using a ritual dagger made by Oshurkov, after which they slit his throat and decapitated him.

The corpse was then burned on a bonfire, with the head thrown into a nearby flooded quarry. Following the murder, Zaika put the skin flap into a bottle of perfume and hid it in a hiding place on the stairs near the entrance to his home. The vial had a sacred meaning to him, as he believed that it contained a fragment of Vasiliev's soul. Later that evening, Kondrashov admitted to Oshurkov that they had killed Vasiliev while the pair were having dinner, but the older man did not believe him and did not go to the authorities.

On the early morning of 28 June, Kondrashov and Zaika went to the Shuvalovskoye Cemetery, where for several hours they burned fires on the graves and drew occult signs, after which Zaika stated that they should make a new sacrifice to Satan. Searching for a victim, the pair traveled to some lakes near Suzdal, Vladimir Oblast, which were approximately 500 meters away from the cemetery. Somewhere around 5 AM, they came across a young man named Vyacheslav Chekhlov, who was sleeping on one of the beaches.

The night before, Chekhlov had been out drinking after work with two friends when they came across three young women. Supposedly, the women put sleeping pills into the men's drinks and robbed them. Approaching Chekhlov, Zaika slashed his throat with three strokes of the knife, killing him in his sleep.

== Arrest, investigation and trial ==
=== Kondrashov's arrest ===
After committing the Chekhlov murder, Kondrashov decided to commit another murder by himself. On 8 July, he went to Ekaterinsky Square, a favorite meeting place for other gay men. There, he met a young interpreter named Andrei "Andy" Basarchik, who invited his new acquaintance back to his apartment on Serebristy Boulevard. Once in the apartment, Kondrashov and Basarchik had dinner and wine, after which Kondrashov assaulted his host, attempting to stab him. At that moment, Basarchik's mother ran into the room and wrestled the assailant away from her son. Threatening them with the knife, Kondrashov stole four jackets, 4,000 rubles and women's clothes from the apartment. He then returned to Oshurkov's place, where he washed himself, put on a wig and changed into the women's clothes.

In the meantime, Basarchik and his mother reported the attack to the police, and while searching the apartment, officers found a notebook that Kondrashov had dropped during his escape. Its first page contained the phone number and residential address of Alexander Oshurkov. On 10 July, the police went to the house and arrested Kondrashov, who was just minutes away from packing up his suitcase and going to the nearby railway station, where he intended to flee the city. When brought in for questioning, Kondrashov broke down and admitted responsibility for the murders, implicating Zaika as his accomplice.

=== Zaika's arrest and confessions ===
When Zaika learned that Kondrashov had been arrested, he packed his things and ran away from home, intent of leaving Saint Petersburg. However, on 14 July, he decided to stop by the house to pick up some rare cactus specimens, whereupon he was immediately detained in an ambush set up by the police.

Following his arrest, Zaika admitted to committing several ritualistic murders throughout the year, but police could only find evidence for two of them. Based on his and Kondrashov's testimonies, police soon arrested Oshurkov as well, charging him with failure to report a crime and the illegal manufacturing and possession of edged weaponry. Since he worked at a factory, he was fond of making such weapons and collected them. An inspection of the apartment led to the recovery of seven daggers, four of which were categorized as "dangerous". After learning about the circumstances of Zaika and Kondrashov's arrests, Oshurkov stated that if Zaika had been at Basarchik's apartment, he would have successfully carried out the plan and not have been caught so "stupidly".

During interrogation, Oshurkov admitted to the edged weaponry charge, but categorically refused guilt on the failure to report charge, claiming that he doubted the two young men's claims because of their age and fanaticism with the occult.

=== Investigation and Zaika's internment ===
After searching Zaika's apartment, investigators found a large amount of chemicals, drugs, poisonous substances, an aspen stake and a bear spear, in addition to many letters and notebooks. In some of the notebooks, Zaika had written down "official characteristics" for himself and Artur Erium – in the notes, Zaika was called "Colonel of the cult forces", Reichsführer-SS of the RF, a doctor of chemical sciences and grandson of the editor-in-chief of the magazine Murzilka.

In later interrogations, Zaika stopped cooperating and began to show signs of insanity, threatening to cast a spell on the headquarters of the investigation team. At the request of his lawyers, Zaika was transferred to the Serbsky Center at the beginning of 2000, where he was examined for two months. He was subsequently diagnosed as suffering from a volatile form of schizophrenia that rendered him unable to understand right from wrong. On this basis, in April 2000, the Saint Petersburg City Court ruled that he should be acquitted by reason of insanity and interned at a psychiatric hospital with intensive supervision.

=== Trials of remaining defendants ===
Following Zaika's internment, the prosecutors proceeded with charging Kondrashov and Oshurkov. Their trial began in November 2000, and lasted a month. Since Zaika and Kondrashov claimed that they carried out their crimes in the name of a Satanic death cult, it led to the case being widely discussed by the public and the media.

Kondrashov was charged as an accomplice in the Vasiliev and Chekhlov murders, while his lawyer actively sought for his client to be declared as unfit to stand trial. However, these attempts were rejected, leading Kondrashov and his lawyer to accuse the court and the prosecutor's office of collusion, arguing that it was convenient for Kondrashov to be declared sane, as in that way, his testimony against Zaika and the other defendants could be used. Oshurkov also alleged that while officers were searching through his apartment, they stole a watch that was worth $1000.

Prior to his sentencing, Kondrashov expressed apparent remorse for what he had done, but also said that he only participated because Zaika threatened to kill him and his parents. These claims were met with doubts from the court, as Kondrashov's parents never left their village in Murmansk during the murders and had cut off all contact with him after he moved to Saint Petersburg. On 15 December 2000, the court found Kondrashov guilty of complicity in the two murders, and imposed a sentence of 24 years imprisonment.

As for Oshurkov, he was convicted of the two charges and sentenced to 3 years imprisonment. However, he was almost immediately released from the courtroom, as he was granted an amnesty in connection with the 55th annual celebration of Victory Day. He was later convicted of involving two minor boys in prostitution.

Zaika's last accomplice, Vladislav Kudryavtsev, was also charged at one point, but was acquitted due to lack of evidence. Experts who studied the ritualistic components of the crimes suspected that Kudryavtsev not only knew about the murders, but also guided Zaika, who was not interested in Satanism prior to meeting him. Indirect evidence to support this theory came from Zaika's notebooks, where the number 666 was mentioned multiple times as a reference to the number of gold implements that King Solomon received, which in ancient culture symbolized the fullness of earthly power and had nothing to do with serving Satan. It was also suggested that Kudryavtsev taught Zaika about the practice of "capturing the soul", which was given as an explanation for why Zaika had cut off some skin from Valery Vasiliev's neck.

== Treatment and release ==
Following his internment at the hospital, Zaika's physical health worsened, as he developed several chronic diseases such as asthma, diabetes, liver disorders and others. Every six months, he was examined by a special medical commission to determine if his mental health had improved. Throughout his treatment, Zaika's mental state was slowly stabilized, and he was later described as an erudite and sociable patient that never caused trouble to anyone.

In early 2020, the commission decided that Zaika's health had noticeably improved, deciding to move him to outpatient treatment. After studying the documents provided by the hospital, the Saint Petersburg City Court approved the discharge of Zaika, who was subsequently released and registered with a psychiatrist. Zaika, who converted to Christianity and started painting while interned, now regularly takes his medication and is described as a religious fanatic.

Following his release, Zaika became a well-known artist in certain circles around the city, as well as a member of the autonomous non-profit organization "Outsiderville", which helps people with mental issues in difficult life situations and in social rehabilitation through art therapy and creative self-realization. Zaika creates paintings in a style he describes as "outsider art" and "art brut", which focuses exclusively on depicting people on the margins of society or outside accepted cultural norms.

In 2023, reporters from RT attempted to interview Zaika, but he declined. In the abstracts of his exhibitions, curators provide information that due to a proper lack of medical care, Zaika had problems with the law and was treated at a psychiatric hospital for a long time. According to his flatmate Maxim, he expresses genuine remorse for what he has done.

== See also ==
- List of Russian serial killers
