= Nenad Petrović =

Nenad Petrović is the name of:

- Nenad Petrović (writer) (1925–2014), Serbian writer
- Nenad Petrović (chess composer) (1907–1989), Croatian chess problemist
- Nenad Petrović (water polo) (born 1977), Macedonian water polo player
