= Grigori Melikov =

Russian footballer

Personal information
- Full name: Grigori Aleksandrovich Melikov
- Date of birth: 11 May 1976 (age 50)
- Height: 1.86 m (6 ft 1 in)
- Position: Goalkeeper

Senior career*
Years	Team	Apps	(Gls)
2001	FC Svetotekhnika Saransk	8	(0)
2002	FC KAMAZ Naberezhnye Chelny	19	(0)
2003	FC Vidnoye	12	(0)
2004	FC Lisma-Mordovia Saransk	3	(0)
2005	FC Chernomorets Novorossiysk		
2006	Lokomotiv Tashkent	6	(0)
2007	FC Zelenograd	3	(0)
2009	FJ Buxoro		
- * Club domestic league appearances and goals

Grigori Aleksandrovich Melikov (Russian: Григорий Александрович Меликов; born 11 May 1976) is a former Russian professional footballer.

== Club career ==
He played in the Russian Football National League for FC Mordovia Saransk in 2004.
