= Dmytro Kozachenko =

Ukrainian footballer

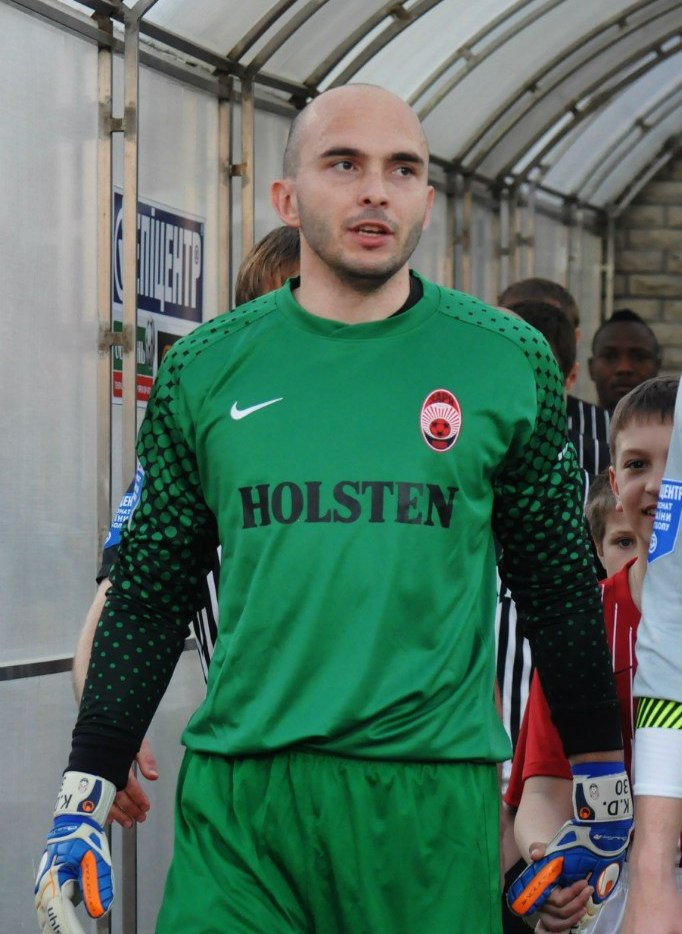

Personal information
- Full name: Dmytro Anatoliyovych Kozachenko
- Date of birth: 11 January 1982 (age 44)
- Place of birth: Kiev, Ukrainian SSR, Soviet Union
- Height: 1.84 m (6 ft 0 in)
- Position: Goalkeeper

Youth career
- 1998: RVUFK Kyiv
- 1998–1999: Obolon Kyiv

Senior career*
Years	Team	Apps	(Gls)
1998–2000	Obolon Kyiv	17	(0)
1999–2000	→ Obolon-2 Kyiv	23	(0)
2001	Vorskla Poltava	0	(0)
2001	→ Vorskla-2 Poltava	9	(0)
2001	Nafkom Brovary	4	(0)
2001–2002	Siena	0	(0)
2003–2004	Nafkom Brovary	58	(2)
2005–2006	Zorya Luhansk	62	(0)
2007	Tavriya Simferopol	2	(0)
2008	Atyrau	18	(0)
2009	Oleksandriya	14	(1)
2010	Nasaf Qarshi	10	(0)
2010	Sumy	10	(0)
2011	Nasaf Qarshi	18	(0)
2012–2013	Zorya Luhansk	13	(0)
2013	→ Mykolaiv (loan)	7	(0)
2014	Zirka Kirovohrad	18	(0)
2015	VPK-Ahro Shevchenkivka	13	(0)
2015	Enerhiya Nova Kakhovka	8	(0)
2016	Petrikivka	7	(1)
2017–2020	LNZ Lebedyn	76	(0)
2022	FC Shturm Ivankiv	0	(0)
Medal record
Men's football
Representing Ukraine
Summer Universiade
Silver medal – second place	2001 Beijing	Team competition
- * Club domestic league appearances and goals

Dmytro Anatoliyovych Kozachenko (Ukrainian: Дмитро Анатолійович Козаченко; born 11 January 1982) is a Ukrainian former professional football goalkeeper. He previously played for FC Obolon Kyiv, FC Nafkom Brovary and FC Zorya Luhansk in Ukraine and FC Atyrau in Kazakhstan.
