= Andrei Zaikin =

Russian footballer

Personal information
- Full name: Andrei Lvovich Zaikin
- Date of birth: 15 August 1968
- Place of birth: Tashkent, Uzbek SSR
- Date of death: 1 June 1993 (aged 24)
- Place of death: Saint Petersburg, Russia
- Height: 1.86 m (6 ft 1 in)
- Position: Goalkeeper

Senior career*
Years	Team	Apps	(Gls)
1984–1986	Pakhtakor Tashkent FK	1	(0)
1986	FC Shakhtyor Angren	7	(0)
1987	FC Zarafshan Navoi	11	(0)
1988–1989	FC SKA Rostov-on-Don	19	(0)
1990–1991	FC Zenit Saint Petersburg	11	(0)
1991	FC Pardaugava Riga	10	(0)
1992	FC Zenit Saint Petersburg	2	(0)
1992	Neftchi FK	1	(0)
- * Club domestic league appearances and goals

Andrei Lvovich Zaikin (Russian: Андрей Львович Заикин; born 15 August 1968 in Tashkent; died 1 June 1993 in Saint Petersburg) was a Russian-Uzbekistani football player.
