= 2023 Uzbekistan Super League =

Season of top level football in Uzbekistan

Uzbekistan Super League
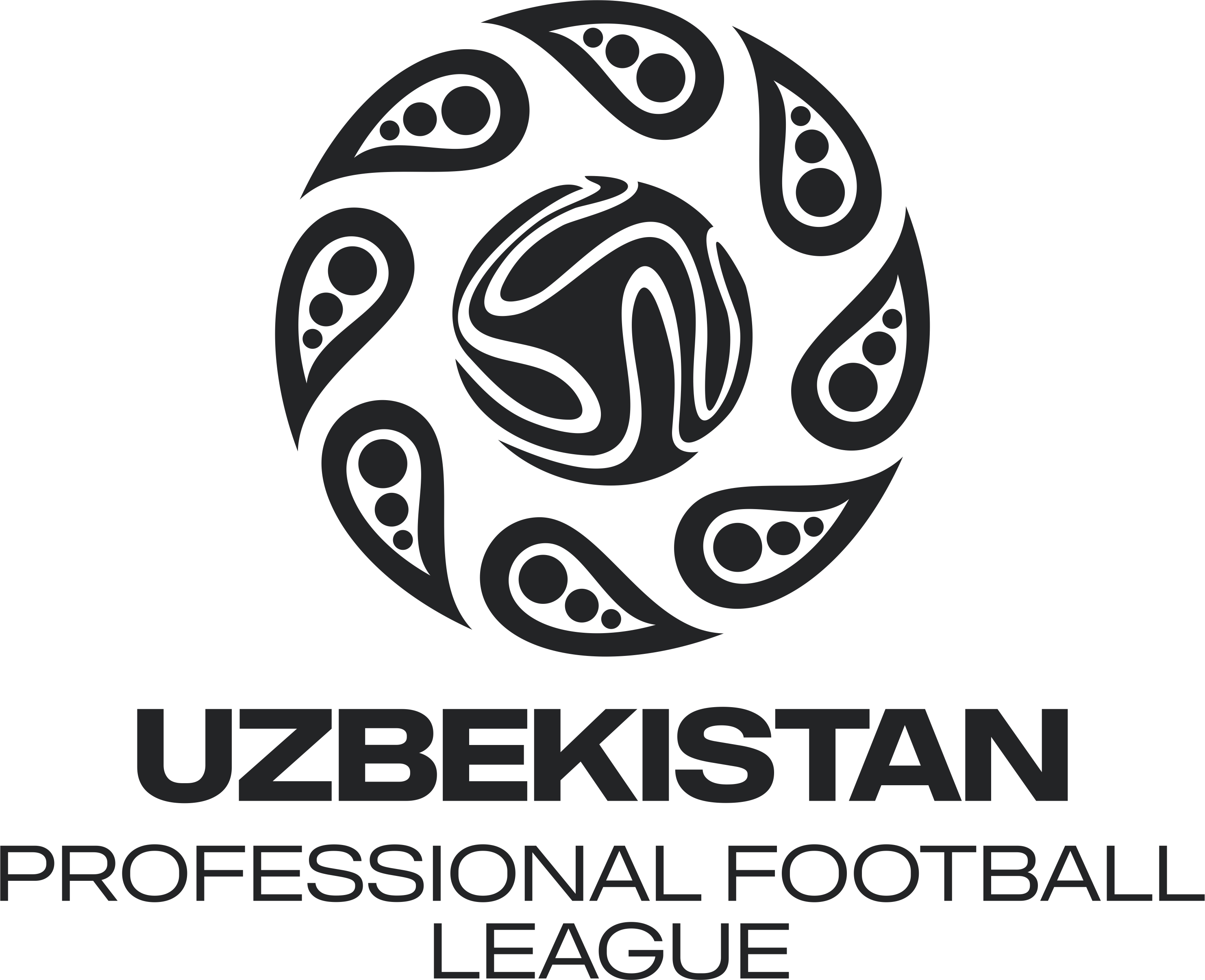
- Season: 2023
- Matches: 181
- Goals: 408 (2.25 per match)
- Top goalscorer: Dragan Ćeran (13)
- Biggest home win: Andijon 5–0 Metallurg Bekabad (24 April 2023); Navbahor Namangan 5–0 Turon (28 September 2023)
- Biggest away win: Bunyodkor 1–5 Navbahor Namangan (22 May 2023)
- Highest scoring: Bunyodkor 1–5 Navbahor Namangan (22 May 2023); AGMK 2–4 Metallurg Bekabad (23 September 2023); Qizilqum Zarafshon 4–2 Sogdiana Jizzakh (30 September 2023)
- Longest winning run: 9 matches Pakhtakor
- Longest unbeaten run: 18 matches Neftchi
- Longest winless run: 13 matches Turon
- Longest losing run: 6 matches Buxoro
- Highest attendance: 25,260 - Navbahor Namangan vs Pakhtakor Tashkent (10 August 2023)
- Lowest attendance: 153 - Olympic vs Qizilqum Zarafshon (26 October 2023)
- Average attendance: 4,570 (1 December 2023)
- All statistics correct as of 1 December 2023.

The 2023 Uzbekistan Super League (in Uzbek: Футбол бўйича 2023-йилги Ўзбекистон Суперлигаси; known as the Coca-Cola Uzbekistan Super League for sponsorship reasons) was the 32nd season of top-level football in Uzbekistan since its establishment in 1992. Pakhtakor Tashkent are the defending champions for the 2022 campaign. FK Andijon, FK Turon Yaypan and FK Buxoro were the three teams promoted to the 2023 Super League. The first matches took place on 3 March 2023.

== Venues ==
Location of teams in 2023 Uzbekistan Super League

== Teams ==
AGMK	Andijon	Buxoro	Bunyodkor	Metallurg	Nasaf	Navbahor
AGMK Stadium	Bobur Arena	Buxoro Arena	Milliy Stadium	Metallurg Bekabad Stadium	Markaziy Stadium	Markaziy Stadium
Capacity: 12,415	Capacity: 18,360	Capacity: 22,700	Capacity: 34,500	Capacity: 15,000	Capacity: 21,000	Capacity: 21,913
Neftchi Fergana	Olympic Tashkent	Pakhtakor	Qizilqum	Sogdiana	Surkhon	Turon
Istiqlol Stadium	JAR Stadium	Central Stadium	Yoshlar Stadium	Sogdiana Stadium	Alpamish Stadium	Uzbekistan Stadium
20,000	8,460	35,000	12,500	11,650	10,000	8,000

Club	Coach	Location	Kit sponsor	Shirt sponsor
AGMK	(Uzbekistan) Mirjalol Qosimov	Olmaliq	(Germany) Jako	AKMK
Andijon	(Russia) Alexander Khomyakov	Andijan	(Chile) D&D Collection	UzAuto
Buxoro	(Tajikistan) Khakim Fuzaylov	Bukhara	(Germany) Puma	BNQIZ
Bunyodkor	(Russia) Aleksandr Krestinin	Tashkent	(Germany) Jako	Uzbekneftegaz
Metallurg	(Spain) Luisma Hernández	Bekabad	(Germany) Adidas	Uzbekistan Metallurgy Combinat
Nasaf	(Uzbekistan) Ruziqul Berdiyev	Qarshi	(Spain) Kelme	Uzbekistan GTL SGCC, ENTER Engineering^{1}
Navbahor	(Uzbekistan) Samvel Babayan	Namangan	(Germany) Adidas	Namangan City
Neftchi Fergana	(Tajikistan) Vitaly Levchenko	Fergana	(Germany) Jako	FNQIZ
Olympic Tashkent	(Uzbekistan) Timur Kapadze	Tashkent	(United States) Nike	Trustbank, Uzmobi^{1}
Pakhtakor	(Uzbekistan) Maksim Shatskikh	Tashkent	(Germany) Puma	Akfa, UzCard^{1}
Qizilqum	(Uzbekistan) Asror Aliqulov	Navoiy	(Germany) Jako	NMMC
Sogdiana	(Montenegro) Ivan Bošković	Jizzakh	(Spain) Joma	BMB Energo
Surkhon	(Uzbekistan) Sergey Tokov	Termez	(Germany) Jako	Eriel
Turon	(Uzbekistan) Bakhtiyor Ashurmatov	Yaypan	(Germany) Saller	Turon Eco Cement, Almera.app

=== Managerial changes ===
Team	Outgoing manager	Manner of departure	Date of vacancy	Position in table	Replaced by	Date of appointment	Ref.
Sogdiana Jizzakh	(Uzbekistan) Ulugbek Bakaev	Resigned	7 November 2022	Preseason	(Montenegro) Ivan Bošković	10 February 2023	
Qizilqum Zarafshon	(Serbia) Nikola Lazarevic	Sacked	29 November 2022	Preseason	(Uzbekistan) Asror Aliqulov	10 January 2023	
Surkhon Termez	(Spain) Miguel Álvarez	Sacked	2 January 2023	Preseason	(Uzbekistan) Sergey Tokov	5 January 2023	
Bunyodkor	(Montenegro) Ivan Bošković		1 February 2023	Preseason	(Uzbekistan) Murat Atadzhanov	1 February 2023	
Bunyodkor	(Uzbekistan) Murat Atadzhanov		6 July 2023	8th	(Russia) Aleksandr Krestinin	7 July 2023	

== Foreign players ==
The number of foreign players is restricted to five per USL team. A team can use only five foreign players on the field in each game.

Club	Player 1	Player 2	Player 3	Player 4	Player 5	AFC players	Former players
AGMK	(Italy) Martin Boakye	(Spain) Rubén Sánchez				(Iran) Siavash Hagh Nazari	(Tunisia) Mohamed Ali Ben Salem (Georgia (country)) Irakli Rukhadze
Andijon	(Albania) Rubin Hebaj	(Georgia (country)) Levan Arveladze	(Montenegro) Armin Bošnjak	(Serbia) Vladimir Bubanja	(Ukraine) Ihor Lytovka		(Tajikistan) **Akhtam Nazarov** (Russia) Nodar Kavtaradze
Bunyodkor	(Belarus) Aleksey Nosko	(Brazil) Wellington Taira	(Montenegro) **Igor Ivanović**	(Serbia) Milan Marčić		(Tajikistan) **Davronjon Ergashev**	(Belarus) Viktar Sotnikaw
Buxoro	(Bosnia and Herzegovina) Luka Kukić	(Croatia) Frane Ikić	(Moldova) Vsevolod Nihaev	(Serbia) Aleksandar Stanisavljević	(Ukraine) Oleksandr Kasyan	(Tajikistan) **Mukhammadzhon Rakhimov**	(Serbia) Nikola Stošić
Metallurg Bekabad	(Bosnia and Herzegovina) Kerim Palić	(Iran) Reza Yazdandoost	(Iran) **Danial Mahini**	(Serbia) Ivan Josović		(Tajikistan) Daler Sharipov	(Montenegro) Marko Obradović (Belarus) Uladzislaw Kasmynin (Serbia) Filip Stamenković
Nasaf	(Argentina) Andrés Chávez	(Brazil) Mateus Lima	(Georgia (country)) **Jaba Jighauri**	(Serbia) Marko Stanojević			(Tajikistan) **Mukhammadzhon Rakhimov**
Navbahor Namangan	(Georgia (country)) Toma Tabatadze	(Montenegro) **Miloš Milović**	(Serbia) **Jovan Đokić**	(Serbia) Luka Čermelj	(Serbia) Filip Ivanović		
Neftchi Fergana	(Australia) Tomislav Mrčela	(Georgia (country)) Giorgi Nikabadze	(Georgia (country)) **Bachana Arabuli**	(Ukraine) Oleksiy Larin		(Tajikistan) **Zoir Dzhuraboyev**	(Georgia (country)) Toma Tabatadze (Ukraine) Yuriy Batyushyn (Ukraine) Andriy Mishchenko
Olympic Tashkent							
Pakhtakor Tashkent	(Belarus) **Pavel Pavlyuchenko**	(Netherlands) Matthew Steenvoorden	(Poland) **Michał Kucharczyk**	(Poland) Przemysław Banaszak	(Serbia) Dragan Ćeran	(Kyrgyzstan) **Kimi Merk**	(Georgia (country)) **Giorgi Papava** (Iran) Mohammadreza Kooshki
Qizilqum Zarafshon	(Georgia (country)) Giorgi Kukhianidze	(Georgia (country)) Akaki Shulaia	(North Macedonia) **Marko Simonovski**	(Nigeria) **Ifeanyi Ifeanyi**	(Russia) Nikolai Tarasov		(Nigeria) **Victor Mbaoma** (Russia) Oleg Tolmasov (Turkmenistan) Bagtyýar Gurgenow
Sogdiana Jizzakh	(Belgium) Dženan Zajmović	(Bosnia and Herzegovina) Tarik Isić	(North Macedonia) **Ljupcho Doriev**	(Serbia) Milan Mitrović	(Serbia) Marko Kolaković		(Russia) Serder Serderov (Montenegro) Damjan Radulović
Surkhon Termez	(Belarus) Artyom Sokol	(Liberia) **Sylvanus Nimely**	(Russia) Tamirlan Dzhamalutdinov	(Russia) Artyom Potapov			(Russia) Shamil Gasanov
Turon Yaypan	(Cameroon) Ngu Abega Enyang						(Georgia (country)) **Zakaria Beglarishvili** (Georgia (country)) Anri Chichinadze (Montenegro) Nikola Kumburović (Serbia) Milan Bojović (Serbia) Dušan Stoiljković

In bold: Players that have been capped for their national team.

== League table ==
Pos	Team	Pld	W	D	L	GF	GA	GD	Pts	Qualification or relegation
1	Pakhtakor (C)	26	16	5	5	41	25	+16	53	Qualification for AFC Champions League Elite league stage
2	Nasaf	26	13	9	4	31	16	+15	48	Qualification for the AFC Champions League Two group stage
3	Navbahor	26	14	5	7	44	19	+25	47	
4	AGMK	26	13	7	6	43	34	+9	46	
5	Neftchi	26	11	12	3	33	18	+15	45	
6	Surkhon	26	11	7	8	28	24	+4	40 (Note: Ranked on head-to-head points: Surkhon 4, Andijon 1.)	
7	Andijon	26	12	4	10	27	25	+2	40	
8	Bunyodkor	26	10	7	9	30	33	−3	37	
9	Olympic	26	8	7	11	26	32	−6	31	
10	Metallurg	26	8	6	12	26	35	−9	30	
11	Sogdiana	26	7	6	13	29	38	−9	27	
12	Qizilqum	26	6	7	13	22	33	−11	25	Relegation play off Uzbekistan Pro League
13	Turon (R)	26	3	7	16	16	41	−25	16	Relegation to Uzbekistan Pro League
14	Buxoro (R)	26	4	3	19	12	35	−23	15	Relegation to Uzbekistan Pro League

Source: Uzbekistan Professional Football League
Rules for classification: 1) points; 2) head-to-head points; 3) head-to-head goal difference; 4) head-to-head away goals scored; 5) goal difference; 6) number of goals scored.
(C) Champions; (R) Relegated

=== Round 1 ===
3 March 2023 1	Paxtakor	2–3	Olimpik	Toshkent
19:15 UZT (UTC+5)	Sayfiyev 43'; Tursunov 63'	Report (in Uzbek)	Jiyanov 7'; Odilov 49'; Abdumajidov 79'	Stadium: Paxtakor; Referee: Aziz Asimov

3 March 2023 2	Metallurg	0–3	Neftchi	Bekabad
18:30 UZT (UTC+5)		Report (in Uzbek)	Adhamzoda 33', 87'; Gʻofurov 87'	Stadium: Metallurg markaziy Referee: Rahimbek Karimov

3 March 2023 3	Soʻgʻdiyona	0–1	Bunyodkor	Zomin
19:15 UZT (UTC+5)		Report (in Uzbek)	Sultonov 72'	Stadium: Zomin; Referee: Asker Najafaliyev

4 March 2023 4	Nasaf	0–1	Andijon	Qarshi
19:15 UZT (UTC+5)		Report (in Uzbek)	Abdunabiyev 72'	Stadium: Qarshi; Referee: Vadim Agishev

4 March 2023 5	Navbahor	3–0	Qizilqum	Namangan
UZT (UTC+5)	Boltaboyev 19'; Golban 73'; Norxonov 75'	Report (in Uzbek)		Stadium: Markaziy Stadium (Namangan); Referee: Ilgiz Tantashev

5 March 2023 6	Surxon	1–3	AGMK	Toshkent
UZT (UTC+5)	Nimely 26'	Report (in Uzbek)	Rustamov 37'; Gadoyev 49'; Gʻiyosov 62'	Stadium: Paxtakor; Referee: Akobirxoʻja Shukrullayev

5 March 2023 7	Turon	1–2	Buxoro	Fargʻona
UZT (UTC+5)	Chichinadze 47'	Report (in Uzbek)	Iminov 30'; Ismoilov 81'	Stadium: Uzbekistan; Referee: Firdavs Norsafarov

=== Round 2 ===
10 March 2023 1	Soʻgʻdiyona	2–2	Olimpik	Jizzax
UZT (UTC+5)	Hasanov 51'; Yoʻldoshev 60'	Report (in Uzbek)	Joʻraqoʻziyev 9'; Odilov 60'	Stadium: Zomin; Referee: Abdurashid Xudoyberganov

10 March 2023 2	Neftchi	2–1	Paxtakor	Fargʻona
UZT (UTC+5)	Larin 52'; Tabatadze 81'	Report (in Uzbek)	Tursunov 90+9'	Stadium: Istiqlol; Referee: Ilgiz Tantashev

11 March 2023 3	Navbahor	3–0	Metallurg	Namangan
UZT (UTC+5)	Boltaboyev 38'; Yaxshiboyev 42'; Iskanderov 90+2'	Report (in Uzbek)		Stadium: Navbahor; Referee: Asker Najafaliyev

11 March 2023 4	Surxon	1–0	Andijon	Toshkent
UZT (UTC+5)	Hamidjonov 81'	Report (in Uzbek)		Stadium: Paxtakor; Referee: Rahimbek Karimov

12 March 2023 5	Qizilqum	1–0	Buxoro	Navoiy
UZT (UTC+5)	Xoltoʻrayev 8'	Report (in Uzbek)		Stadium: Yoshlar; Referee: Vadim Agishev

12 March 2023 6	Nasaf	2–1	Turon	Qarshi
UZT (UTC+5)	Siddiqov 45+6'; Aliqulov 90+9'	Report (in Uzbek)	Roʻziyev 32'	Stadium: Qarshi; Referee: Aziz Asimov

13 March 2023 7	AGMK	2–3	Bunyodkor	Olmaliq
UZT (UTC+5)	Gadoyev 54'; Rukhadze 85'	Report (in Uzbek)	Abdurahmonov 26'; Ivanović 61'; Izzatov 90+9'	Stadium: OKMK; Referee: Rustam Lutfullin

=== Round 3 ===
17 March 2023 1	Olimpik	0–1	AGMK	Toshkent
UZT (UTC+5)		Report (in Uzbek)	Hagh Nazari 53'	Stadium: Jar; Referee: Ilgiz Tantashev

17 March 2023 2	Buxoro	0–1	Nasaf	Buxoro
UZT (UTC+5)		Report (in Uzbek)	Aliqulov 53'	Stadium: Buxoro Arena; Referee: Akobirxoʻja Shukrullayev

17 March 2023 3	Paxtakor	2–1	Navbahor	Toshkent
UZT (UTC+5)	Sayfiyev 2'; Ćeran 68'	Report (in Uzbek)	Abduxoliqov 22'	Stadium: Paxtakor; Referee: Vadim Agishev

18 March 2023 4	Soʻgʻdiyona	0–2	Neftchi	Jizzax
UZT (UTC+5)		Report (in Uzbek)	Toʻxtasinov 5'; Hoshimov 39'	Stadium: Zomin; Referee: Firdavs Norsafarov

18 March 2023 5	Andijon	0–3	Bunyodkor	Fargʻona
UZT (UTC+5)		Report (in Uzbek)	Abdumannopov 22'; Ivanović 37'; Ismonaliyev 65'	Stadium: Istiqlol; Referee: Shavkat Nasibullayev

19 March 2023 6	Metallurg	1–0	Qizilqum	Bekabad
UZT (UTC+5)	Gʻofurbekov 58'	Report (in Uzbek)		Stadium: Metallurg; Referee: Rustam Lutfullin

19 March 2023 7	Turon	1–1	Surxon	Termiz
UZT (UTC+5)	Norbekov 39'	Report (in Uzbek)	Jamalutdinov 89'	Stadium: Surxon; Referee: Abdurashid Xudoyberganov

=== Round 4 ===
31 March 2023 1	Surxon	2–0	Turon	Toshkent
UZT (UTC+5)	Nimely 50'; Sherboʻtayev 90'	Report (in Uzbek)		Stadium: Paxtakor; Referee: Shavkat Nasibullayev

31 March 2023 2	Neftchi	2–2	AGMK	Fargʻona
UZT (UTC+5)	Larin 31'; To‘xtasinov 66'	Report (in Uzbek)	Boakye 15'; Gʻiyosov 40'	Stadium: Istiqlol; Referee: Akobirxoʻja Shukrullayev

1 April 2023 3	Navbahor	3–0	Soʻgʻdiyona	Namangan
UZT (UTC+5)	Milović 13'; Oʻrunov 25'; Joʻrabekov 52'	Report (in Uzbek)		Stadium: Navbahor; Referee: Temur Toʻxtasinov

1 April 2023 4	Qizilqum	2–2	Nasaf	Navoiy
UZT (UTC+5)	Kenjaboyev 55'	Report (in Uzbek)	Abdurahmatov 90+6'	Stadium: Yoshlar; Referee: Asker Najafaliyev

2 April 2023 5	Bunyodkor	2–2	Turon	Toshkent
UZT (UTC+5)		Report (in Uzbek)		Stadium: Bunyodkor; Referee: Ilgiz Tantashev

2 April 2023 6	Metallurg	1–3	Paxtakor	Bekabad
UZT (UTC+5)	Gʻofurov 85'	Report (in Uzbek)	Ćeran 41', 69', 80'	Stadium: Metallurg; Referee: Ilgiz Tantashev

3 April 2023 7	Olympic	0–1	Andijon	Toshkent
UZT (UTC+5)		Report (in Uzbek)	Mamatkazin 3'	Stadium: Jar; Referee: Gʻayrat Joʻrayev

=== Round 5 ===
7 April 2023 1	Surxon	2–0	Turon	Toshkent
UZT (UTC+5)	Nimely 50'; Sherboʻtayev 90'	Report (in Uzbek)		Stadium: Paxtakor; Referee: Shavkat Nasibullayev

7 April 2023 2	Turon	0–1	Olimpik	Fargʻona
UZT (UTC+5)		Report (in Uzbek)	Chichinadze 68'	Stadium: Uzbekistan; Referee: Ibrohim Ismoilov

8 April 2023 3	Soʻgʻdiyona	2–2	Metallurg	Jizzax
UZT (UTC+5)	Halilov 43'; Serderov 78'	Report (in Uzbek)	Ibrohimov 58'; Oʻrinboyev 76'	Stadium: Zomin; Referee: Ilgiz Tantashev

8 April 2023 4	Andijon	0–2	Neftchi	Fargʻona
UZT (UTC+5)		Report (in Uzbek)	Toʻxtasinov 20'; Turopov 90'	Stadium: Istiqlol; Referee: Asker Najafaliyev

9 April 2023 5	AGMK	2–1	Navbahor	Toshkent
UZT (UTC+5)	Sanches 75'; Joʻrabekov 64' (o.g.)	Report (in Uzbek)	Iskanderov 57'	Stadium: Jar; Referee: Ahrol Risqullayev

9 April 2023 6	Nasaf	3–2	Surxon	Qarshi
UZT (UTC+5)	Lima 29'; Siddiqov 67' (o.g.); Nasrullayev 77'	Report (in Uzbek)	Nimely 35'; Karimov 62'; Potapov 67' (o.g.)	Stadium: Qarshi; Referee: Asker Najafaliyev

10 April 2023 7	Paxtakor	3–1	Qizilqum	Toshkent
UZT (UTC+5)	Fayzullayev 13'; Turgʻunboyev 35'; Ćeran 74'	Report (in Uzbek)	Mbaoma 89'	Stadium: Paxtakor; Referee: Shavkat Nasibullayev

=== Round 6 ===
14 April 2023 1	Navbahor	1–0	Andijon	Namangan
UZT (UTC+5)	Abduxoliqov 65'	Report (in Uzbek)		Stadium: Navbahor; Referee: Akobirxoʻja Shukurullayev

14 April 2023 2	Qizilqum	0–0	Surxon	Navoiy
UZT (UTC+5)		Report (in Uzbek)		Stadium: Yoshlar; Referee: Ahrol Risqullayev

15 April 2023 3	Paxtakor	2–1	Soʻgʻdiyona	Toshkent
UZT (UTC+5)	Fayzullayev 33'; Ćeran 43'	Report (in Uzbek)	Zajmović 90+5'	Stadium: Paxtakor; Referee: Rustam Lutfullin

16 April 2023 4	Metallurg	2–0	AGMK	Bekabad
UZT (UTC+5)	Ibrohimov 55'; Neʼmatjonov 63'	Report (in Uzbek)		Stadium: Metallurg; Referee: Asker Najafaliyev

16 April 2023 5	Olympic	1–0	Buxoro	Toshkent
UZT (UTC+5)	Mamasidiqov 13'	Report (in Uzbek)		Stadium: Jar; Referee: Firdavs Norsafarov

17 April 2023 6	Neftchi	1–1	Turon	Fargʻona
UZT (UTC+5)	Hoshimov 50'	Report (in Uzbek)	Ngu 90'	Stadium: Istiqlol; Referee: Sultonmurod Abdurahmonov

17 April 2023 7	Bunyodkor	1–1	Nasaf	Toshkent
UZT (UTC+5)	Nosko 90+7'	Report (in Uzbek)	Gʻaybullayev 40'	Stadium: Bunyodkor; Referee: Feruz Rahimov

=== Round 7 ===
21 April 2023 1	Surxon	1–0	Bunyodkor	Toshkent
UZT (UTC+5)	Jumayev 52'	Report (in Uzbek)		Stadium: Paxtakor; Referee: Ilgiz Tantashev

21 April 2023 2	Buxoro	2–2	Neftchi	Buxoro
UZT (UTC+5)	Stanisavljević 52', 90+3'	Report (in Uzbek)	Hoshimov 32'; Abdullayev 82'	Stadium: Buxoro Arena; Referee: Aziz Asimov

22 April 2023 3	Soʻgʻdiyona	1–0	Qizilqum	Jizzax
UZT (UTC+5)	Zajmović 73'	Report (in Uzbek)		Stadium: Zomin; Referee: Gʻayrat Joʻrayev

22 April 2023 4	AGMK	1–2	Paxtakor	Toshkent
UZT (UTC+5)	Gʻiyosov 49'	Report (in Uzbek)	Ćeran 65'; Turgʻunboyev 85'	Stadium: Jar; Referee: Temurbek Toʻxtasinov

23 April 2023 5	Turon	0–2	Navbahor	Fargʻona
UZT (UTC+5)		Report (in Uzbek)	Đokić 47'; Oʻrunov 63'	Stadium: Uzbekistan; Referee: Rahimbek Karimov

24 April 2023 6	Andijon	5–0	Metallurg	Fargʻona
UZT (UTC+5)	Hebaj 2', 9', 83'; Arveladze 15'; Berdiyev 84'	Report (in Uzbek)		Stadium: Istiqlol; Referee: Husan Muzaffarov

24 April 2023 7	Nasaf	3–0	Olympic	Qarshi
UZT (UTC+5)	Aliqulov 45+1', 70'; Davronov 90+5'	Report (in Uzbek)		Stadium: Markaziy; Referee: Shavkat Nasibullayev

=== Round 8 ===
29 June 2023 1	Paxtakor	1–1	Andijon	Toshkent
UZT (UTC+5)	Alijonov 53'	Report (in Uzbek)	Hebaj 78'	Stadium: Paxtakor; Referee: Vadim Agishev

30 June 2023 2	Qizilqum	2–0	Bunyodkor	Navoiy
UZT (UTC+5)	Kenjaboyev 38'; Toshpoʻlatov 53'	Report (in Uzbek)		Stadium: Yoshlar; Referee: Aziz Asimov

1 July 2023 3	Soʻgʻdiyona	1–2	AGMK	Jizzax
UZT (UTC+5)	Mirahmadov 53'	Report (in Uzbek)	Boakye 28'; Samandarjon Mavlonqulov 75'	Stadium: Soʻgʻdiyona; Referee: Sultonmurod Abdurahmonov

1 July 2023 4	Navbahor	1–0	Buxoro	Namangan
UZT (UTC+5)	Milović 81'	Report (in Uzbek)		Stadium: Navbahor; Referee: Akmal Rahimov

2 July 2023 5	Neftchi	2–1	Nasaf	Fargʻona
UZT (UTC+5)	Tabatadze 51', 84'	Report (in Uzbek)	Amonov 68'	Stadium: Istiqlol; Referee: Shavkat Nasibullayev

2 July 2023 6	Olimpik	1–1	Surxon	Toshkent
UZT (UTC+5)	Mamasidiqov	Report (in Uzbek)	Nimely 76'	Stadium: Jar; Referee: Shavkat Nasibullayev

3 July 2023 7	Metallurg	1–1	Turon	Bekabad
UZT (UTC+5)	Neʼmatjonov 78'	Report (in Uzbek)	Murtozoyev 76'	Stadium: Metallurg; Referee: Shavkat Nasibullayev

=== Round 9 ===
4 May 2023 1	Buxoro	1–0	Metallurg	Buxoro
UZT (UTC+5)	Ahmedov 37'	Report (in Uzbek)		Stadium: Buxoro; Referee: Ravshan Abduvohidov

5 May 2023 2	Andijon	1–2	Soʻgʻdiyona	Fargʻona
UZT (UTC+5)	Hebaj 15'	Report (in Uzbek)	Shayqulov 88'; Zajmović 90+4'	Stadium: Istiqlol

6 May 2023 3	Bunyodkor	1–1	Olimpik	Toshkent
UZT (UTC+5)	Hakimov 71'	Report (in Uzbek)	Joʻraqoʻziyev 5'	Stadium: Bunyodkor

6 May 2023 4	Turon	0–1	Paxtakor	Fargʻona
UZT (UTC+5)		Report (in Uzbek)	Ćeran 40'	Stadium: Uzbekistan

7 May 2023 5	Nasaf	0–0	Navbahor	Qarshi
UZT (UTC+5)		Report (in Uzbek)		Stadium: Qarshi

7 May 2023 6	Surxon	2–2	Neftchi	Toshkent
UZT (UTC+5)	Jumayev 45+2'; Nimely 77'	Report (in Uzbek)	Tabatadze 16', 53'	Stadium: Paxtakor

8 May 2023 7	AGMK	4–0	Qizilqum	Toshkent
UZT (UTC+5)	Tursunov 23'; Gadoyev 51'; Gʻiyosov 81'; Sanches 90+3'	Report (in Uzbek)		Stadium: Jar

=== Round 10 ===
12 May 2023 1	Qizilqum	0–1	Olympic	Navoiy
UZT (UTC+5)		Report (in Uzbek)	Odilov 48'	Stadium: Yoshlar; Referee: Rahimbek Karimov

13 May 2023 2	Soʻgʻdiyona	2–0	Turon	Jizzax
UZT (UTC+5)	Zajmović 57', 76'	Report (in Uzbek)		Stadium: Soʻgʻdiyona; Referee: Komiljon Rasulov

13 May 2023 3	Paxtakor	1–0	Buxoro	Toshkent
UZT (UTC+5)	Turgʻunboyev 45+1'	Report (in Uzbek)		Stadium: Paxtakor; Referee: Akobirxoʻja Shukurullayev

14 May 2023 4	Navbahor	1–0	Surxon	Namangan
UZT (UTC+5)	Yaxshiboyev 42'	Report (in Uzbek)		Stadium: Namangan; Referee: Sultonmurod Abdurahmonov

14 May 2023 5	AGMK	2–1	Andijon	Navoiy
UZT (UTC+5)	Boakye 81'; Boakye 90+1'	Report (in Uzbek)	Hebaj 35'	Stadium: Yoshlar; Referee: Rahimbek Karimov

15 May 2023 6	Metallurg	1–2	Nasaf	Bekabad
UZT (UTC+5)	Ismoilov 3'	Report (in Uzbek)	Amonov 70'; Davronov 90+2'	Stadium: Metallurg; Referee: Toʻrabek Suyunov

15 May 2023 7	Neftchi	1–0	Bunyodkor	Fargʻona
UZT (UTC+5)	Turopov 83'	Report (in Uzbek)		Stadium: Istiqlol; Referee: Asker Najafaliyev

=== Round 11 ===
19 May 2023 1	Buxoro	0–2	Soʻgʻdiyona	Buxoro
UZT (UTC+5)		Report (in Uzbek)	Qahramonov 58'; Zajmović 82'	Stadium: Buxoro; Referee: Gʻayrat Joʻrayev

20 May 2023 2	Surxon	1–0	Metallurg	Toshkent
UZT (UTC+5)	Nimely 35'	Report (in Uzbek)		Stadium: Paxtakor; Referee: Akobirxoʻja Shukurullayev

21 May 2023 3	Turon	1–1	AGMK	Toshkent
UZT (UTC+5)	Muxtorov 80'	Report (in Uzbek)	Tursunov 54'	Stadium: Paxtakor; Referee: Akobirxoʻja Shukurullayev

21 May 2023 4	Olimpik	0–0	Neftchi	Toshkent
UZT (UTC+5)		Report (in Uzbek)		Stadium: Jar; Referee: Ilgiz Tantashev

22 May 2023 5	Andijon	2–0	Qizilqum	Fargʻona
UZT (UTC+5)	Alijonov 59'; Hebaj 90+8'	Report (in Uzbek)		Stadium: Istiqlol; Referee: Rustam Choriyev

22 May 2023 6	Bunyodkor	1–5	Navbahor	Toshkent
UZT (UTC+5)	Hakimov 76'	Report (in Uzbek)	Boltaboyev 14'; Golban 20'; Ismoilov 22'; Oʻrunov 28', 37'	Stadium: Bunyodkor; Referee: Rustam Lutfullin

15 August 2023 7	Nasaf	0–0	Paxtakor	Qarshi
UZT (UTC+5)		Report (in Uzbek)		Stadium: Qarshi; Referee: Ilgiz Tantashev

=== Round 12 ===
26 May 2023 1	Qizilqum	1–1	Neftchi	Navoiy
UZT (UTC+5)	Toshpoʻlatov 25'	Report (in Uzbek)	Tabatadze 18'	Stadium: Yoshlar; Referee: Ibrohim Ismoilov

26 May 2023 2	AGMK	3–1	Buxoro	Toshkent
UZT (UTC+5)	Boakye 36'; Ismoilov 68'; Nazari 83'	Report (in Uzbek)	Iminov 11'	Stadium: Jar; Referee: Komiljon Rasulov

27 May 2023 3	Metallurg	1–1	Bunyodkor	Bekabad
UZT (UTC+5)	Temirov 17'	Report (in Uzbek)	Hakimov 24'	Stadium: Metallurg; Referee: Ibrohim Ismoilov

27 May 2023 4	Andijon	2–1	Turon	Fargʻona
UZT (UTC+5)	Alijonov 77'; Hebaj 81'	Report (in Uzbek)	Muxtorov 12'	Stadium: Istiqlol; Referee: Asker Najafaliyev

28 May 2023 5	Soʻgʻdiyona	1–2	Nasaf	Jizzax
UZT (UTC+5)	Kolaković 4'	Report (in Uzbek)	Bozorov 9'; Mozgovoy 37'	Stadium: Soʻgʻdiyona

28 May 2023 6	Navbahor	2–1	Olimpik	Namangan
UZT (UTC+5)	Iskanderov 43'; Oʻrunov 50'	Report (in Uzbek)	Jiyanov 90+3'	Stadium: Navbahor

29 May 2023 7	Paxtakor	1–0	Surxon	Toshkent
UZT (UTC+5)	Ćeran 75'	Report (in Uzbek)		Stadium: Paxtakor; Referee: Rahimbek Karimov

=== Round 13 ===
23 June 2023 1	Buxoro	0–1	Andijon	Buxoro
UZT (UTC+5)		Report (in Uzbek)	Hebaj 51'	Stadium: Buxoro; Referee: Ahrol Risqullayev

23 June 2023 2	Surxon	1–0	Soʻgʻdiyona	Toshkent
UZT (UTC+5)	Abdusalomov 90+1'	Report (in Uzbek)		Stadium: Paxtakor; Referee: Vadim Agishev

24 June 2023 3	Nasaf	2–0	AGMK	Qarshi
UZT (UTC+5)	Lima 3'; Aliqulov 48'	Report (in Uzbek)		Stadium: Qarshi; Referee: Ilgiz Tantashev

24 June 2023 4	Turon	0–0	Qizilqum	Fargʻona
UZT (UTC+5)		Report (in Uzbek)		Stadium: Uzbekistan; Referee: Vadim Agishev

25 June 2023 5	Neftchi	0–0	Navbahor	Fargʻona
UZT (UTC+5)		Report (in Uzbek)		Stadium: Istiqlol

25 June 2023 6	Bunyodkor	1–2	Paxtakor	Toshkent
UZT (UTC+5)	Izzatov 11'	Report (in Uzbek)	Alijonov 72'; Xoldorxonov 90+5'	Stadium: Bunyodkor; Referee: Temurbek Toʻxtasinov

26 June 2023 7	Olimpik	1–2	Metallurg	Toshkent
UZT (UTC+5)	Jaloliddinov 28'	Report (in Uzbek)	Oʻrinboyev 66', 81'	Stadium: Jar; Referee: Firdavs Norsafarov

=== Round 14 ===
27 July 2023 1	Buxoro	2–3	Turon	Buxoro
UZT (UTC+5)	Joʻraboyev 84'; Norxonov 86'	Report (in Uzbek)	Jumanqoʻziyev 21'; Komilov 64'; Saidxonov 90+6'	Stadium: Buxoro; Referee: Nayim Qosimov

28 July 2023 2	Andijon	0–0	Nasaf	Andijon
UZT (UTC+5)		Report (in Uzbek)		Stadium: Bobur; Referee: Rustam Lutfullin

28 July 2023 3	Olimpik	0–2	Paxtakor	Toshkent
UZT (UTC+5)		Report (in Uzbek)	Xolmatov 3'; Cheran 54'	Stadium: Jar; Referee: Ilgiz Tantashev

29 July 2023 4	AGMK	2–3	Surxon	Toshkent
UZT (UTC+5)	Abdullayev 12', 87'	Report (in Uzbek)	Nimely 19'; Karimov 48'; Karimov 82'	Stadium: Jar; Referee: Gʻayrat Joʻrayev

29 July 2023 5	Neftchi	0–2	Metallurg	Fargʻona
UZT (UTC+5)	Gʻulomov 72'	Report (in Uzbek)		Stadium: Istiqlol; Referee: Rustam Choriyev

30 July 2023 6	Bunyodkor	0–2	Soʻgʻdiyona	Toshkent
UZT (UTC+5)		Report (in Uzbek)	Qahramonov 12'; Zajmović 44'	Stadium: Bunyodkor; Referee: Husan Muzaffarov

30 July 2023 7	Qizilqum	1–2	Navbahor	Navoiy
UZT (UTC+5)	Kenjaboyev 10'	Report (in Uzbek)	Boltaboyev 3'; Yaxshiboyev 60'	Stadium: Yoshlar; Referee: Rahimbek Karimov

=== Round 15 ===
4 August 2023 1	Andijon	0–0	Surxon	Andijon
UZT (UTC+5)		Report (in Uzbek)		Stadium: Bobur; Referee: Toʻrabek Suyunov

4 August 2023 2	Metallurg	1–1	Navbahor	Bekabad
UZT (UTC+5)	Oʻrinboyev 90+6'	Report (in Uzbek)	Yoʻldoshev 22'	Stadium: Metallurg; Referee: Komiljon Rasulov

5 August 2023 3	Turon	1–0	Nasaf	Fargʻona
UZT (UTC+5)	Murtozoyev 23'	Report (in Uzbek)		Stadium: Uzbekistan; Referee: Sultonmurod Abdurahmonov

5 August 2023 4	Buxoro	1–0	Qizilqum	Buxoro
UZT (UTC+5)	Joʻrayev 37'	Report (in Uzbek)		Stadium: Buxoro; Referee: Shavkat Nasibullayev

5 August 2023 5	Paxtakor	0–1	Neftchi	Toshkent
UZT (UTC+5)		Report (in Uzbek)	Turopov 69'	Stadium: Paxtakor

6 August 2023 6	Olimpik	3–3	Soʻgʻdiyona	Toshkent
UZT (UTC+5)	Mamasiddiqov 24'; Jaloliddinov 28'; Joʻraboyev 90+7'	Report (in Uzbek)	Qahramonov 7'; Zajmović 45'; Mavlonqulov 90+4'	Stadium: Jar; Referee: Temurbek Toʻxtasinov

6 August 2023 7	Bunyodkor	1–1	AGMK	Fargʻona
UZT (UTC+5)	Izzatov 90+3'	Report (in Uzbek)	Nazari 62'	Stadium: Bunyodkor; Referee: Temurbek Toʻxtasinov

=== Round 16 ===
10 August 2023 1	Navbahor	1–2	Paxtakor	Namangan
UZT (UTC+5)	Tabatadze 68'	Report (in Uzbek)	Ćeran 30'; Hamroliyev 44'	Stadium: Navbahor; Referee: Akobirxoʻja Shukurullayev

10 August 2023 2	Nasaf	1–0	Buxoro	Qarshi
UZT (UTC+5)	Davronov 74'	Report (in Uzbek)		Stadium: Qarshi; Referee: Farrux Yansupov

11 August 2023 3	AGMK	2–1	Olimpik	Olmaliq
UZT (UTC+5)	Gʻiyosov 15'; Sanches 47'	Report (in Uzbek)	Mirsaidov 7'	Stadium: OKMK; Referee: Asker Najafaliyev

11 August 2023 4	Neftchi	0–0	Soʻgʻdiyona	Fargʻona
UZT (UTC+5)		Report (in Uzbek)		Stadium: Istiqlol

12 August 2023 5	Surxon	1–0	Turon	Toshkent
UZT (UTC+5)	Nimely 43'	Report (in Uzbek)		Stadium: Paxtakor; Referee: Ahrol Risqullayev

12 August 2023 6	Bunyodkor	2–1	Andijon	Toshkent
UZT (UTC+5)	Hakimov 21'; Nosko 67'	Report (in Uzbek)	Bošnjak 2'	Stadium: Bunyodkor; Referee: Abdurashid Xudoyberganov

13 August 2023 7	Qizilqum	0–2	Metallurg	Navoiy
UZT (UTC+5)		Report (in Uzbek)	G‘afurov 55'; Abdumannonov 90+3'	Stadium: Yoshlar; Referee: Olim Toʻychiboyev

=== Round 17 ===
19 August 2023 1	Paxtakor	1–0	Metallurg	Toshkent
UZT (UTC+5)	Banaszak 45'	Report (in Uzbek)		Stadium: Paxtakor; Referee: Sultonmurod Abdurahmonov

19 August 2023 2	Nasaf	0–0	Qizilqum	Qarshi
UZT (UTC+5)		Report (in Uzbek)		Stadium: Qarshi; Referee: Gʻayrat Joʻrayev

20 August 2023 3	Turon	1–2	Bunyodkor	Fargʻona
UZT (UTC+5)	Jumanqoʻziyev 45+1'	Report (in Uzbek)	O‘tkirov 5'; Yoʻldoshev 90+5'	Stadium: Uzbekistan; Referee: Shavkat Nasibullayev

20 August 2023 4	Buxoro	1–1	Surxon	Buxoro
UZT (UTC+5)	Qayumov 80'	Report (in Uzbek)	Abdusalomov 89'	Stadium: Buxoro; Referee: Ibrohim Ismoilov

21 August 2023 5	Andijon	2–1	Olimpik	Andijon
UZT (UTC+5)	Hebaj 3'; Bošnjak 51'	Report (in Uzbek)	Odilov 19'	Stadium: Bobur; Referee: Akobirxoʻja Shukurullayev

26 August 2023 6	AGMK	1–1	Neftchi	Olmaliq
UZT (UTC+5)	Gʻiyosov 43'	Report (in Uzbek)	Ubaydullayev 89'	Stadium: Olmaliq; Referee: Ilgiz Tantashev

26 August 2023 7	Soʻgʻdiyona	2–1	Navbahor	Jizzax
UZT (UTC+5)	Mavlonqulov 16'; Doriyev 81'	Report (in Uzbek)	Oʻrunov 67'	Stadium: Soʻgʻdiyona; Referee: Farrux Yansupov

=== Round 18 ===
25 August 2023 1	Olimpik	2–0	Turon	Toshkent
UZT (UTC+5)	Mamasidiqov 27'; Odilov 73'	Report (in Uzbek)		Stadium: Jar; Referee: Husan Muzaffarov

27 August 2023 2	Bunyodkor	1–2	Buxoro	Toshkent
UZT (UTC+5)	Marčić 37'	Report (in Uzbek)	Qayumov 21'; Norxonov 90+6'	Stadium: Bunyodkor; Referee: Rustam Lutfullin

29 August 2023 3	Surxon	1–2	Nasaf	Toshkent
UZT (UTC+5)	Nimely 80'	Report (in Uzbek)	Jighauri 20'; Mozgovoy 71'	Stadium: Paxtakor; Referee: Rustam Lutfullin

29 August 2023 4	Qizilqum	2–3	Paxtakor	Navoiy
UZT (UTC+5)	Kenjaboyev 42'; Akaki Shulaya 90+6'	Report (in Uzbek)	Xolmatov 14'; Hamrobekov 25'; Sobirxoʻjayev 77'	Stadium: Yoshlar

30 August 2023 5	Metallurg	3–1	Soʻgʻdiyona	Bekabad
UZT (UTC+5)	Oʻrinboyev 16', 55'; Palić 58'	Report (in Uzbek)	Isić 79'	Stadium: Metallurg; Referee: Ravshan Abduvohidov

30 August 2023 6	Navbahor	0–0	AGMK	Namangan
UZT (UTC+5)		Report (in Uzbek)		Stadium: Navbahor; Referee: Temurbek Toʻxtasinov

31 August 2023 7	Neftchi	0–0	Andijon	Fargʻona
UZT (UTC+5)		Report (in Uzbek)		Stadium: Istiqlol; Referee: Akobirxoʻja Shukurullayev

=== Round 19 ===
22 September 2023 1	Surxon	1–2	Qizilqum	Toshkent
UZT (UTC+5)	Nimely 62'	Report (in Uzbek)	Shulaya 43'; Kenjaboyev 72'	Stadium: Paxtakor; Referee: Shavkat Nasibullayev

23 September 2023 2	Andijon	2–1	Navbahor	Andijon
UZT (UTC+5)	Alijonov 54'; Berdiyev 90+4'	Report (in Uzbek)	Ismoilov 2'	Stadium: Bobur; Referee: Abdurashid Xudoyberganov

23 September 2023 3	AGMK	2–4	Metallurg	Olmaliq
UZT (UTC+5)	Gʻiyosov 36'; Komilov 66'	Report (in Uzbek)	Yazdandoost 23'; Ubaydullayev 28'; Ubaydullayev 58'; Oʻrinboyev 81'	Stadium: OKMK; Referee: Aziz Asimov

24 September 2023 4	Nasaf	0–1	Bunyodkor	Qarshi
UZT (UTC+5)		Report (in Uzbek)	Ismonaliyev 88'	Stadium: Qarshi; Referee: Olim Toʻychiboyev

24 September 2023 5	Soʻgʻdiyona	1–1	Paxtakor	Jizzax
UZT (UTC+5)	Mavlonqulov 44'	Report (in Uzbek)	Xoldorxonov 90+6'	Stadium: Soʻgʻdiyona; Referee: Ahrol Risqullayev

9 November 2023 6	Turon	0–3	Neftchi	Fargʻona
UZT (UTC+5)		Report (in Uzbek)	Gʻulomov 29'; Muhiddinov 56'; Abdullayev 91'	Stadium: Uzbekistan; Referee: Olim To'ychiboyev

10 November 2023 7	Buxoro	0–1	Olimpik	Buxoro
UZT (UTC+5)		Report (in Uzbek)	Jaloliddinov 90+13'	Stadium: Buxoro; Referee: Komiljon Rasulov

=== Round 20 ===
27 September 2023 1	Metallurg	2–0	Andijon	Olmaliq
UZT (UTC+5)	Ubaydullayev 27'; Sharipov 69'	Report (in Uzbek)		Stadium: OKMK; Referee: Firdavs Norsafarov

27 September 2023 2	Neftchi	3–0	Buxoro	Fargʻona
UZT (UTC+5)	Nikabadze 17', 24'; Turopov 81'	Report (in Uzbek)		Stadium: Istiqlol; Referee: Asker Najafaliyev

28 September 2023 3	Olimpik	1–3	Nasaf	Toshkent
UZT (UTC+5)	Mamasidiqov 56'	Report (in Uzbek)	Amonov 1'; Lima 32'; Stanojević 89'	Stadium: Jar; Referee: Rahimbek Karimov

28 September 2023 4	Paxtakor	2–2	AGMK	Toshkent
UZT (UTC+5)	Banaszak 24'; Turgʻunboyev 63'	Report (in Uzbek)	Mirahmadov 22'; Ahmadaliyev 39'	Stadium: Paxtakor; Referee: Akobirxoʻja Shukurullayev

28 September 2023 5	Navbahor	5–0	Turon	Namangan
UZT (UTC+5)	Ivanović 23'; Yaxshiboyev 45+3'; Oʻrunov 51', 66'; Sobirjonov 90+3'	Report (in Uzbek)		Stadium: Navbahor; Referee: Toʻrabek Suyunov

29 September 2023 6	Bunyodkor	0–1	Surxon	Toshkent
UZT (UTC+5)		Report (in Uzbek)	Asqarov 85'	Stadium: Bunyodkor; Attendance: 856; Referee: Nayim Qosimov

30 September 2023 7	Qizilqum	4–2	Soʻgʻdiyona	Navoiy
UZT (UTC+5)	Ifeanyi 19', 42'; Gʻiyosov 57'; Kenjaboyev 85'	Report (in Uzbek)	Isić 34'; Qahramonov 51'	Referee: Ravshan Abduvohidov

=== Round 21 ===
5 October 2023 1	Turon	1–1	Metallurg	Fargʻona
UZT (UTC+5)	Murtozoyev 36'	Report (in Uzbek)	Ubaydullayev 53'	Stadium: Uzbekistan; Referee: Farrux Yansupov

6 October 2023 2	Bunyodkor	2–2	Qizilqum	Toshkent
UZT (UTC+5)	Oʻlmasaliyev 58'; Sultonov 82'	Report (in Uzbek)	Kenjaboyev 50'; Gʻiyosov 75'	Stadium: Bunyodkor

7 October 2023 3	AGMK	3–2	Soʻgʻdiyona	Olmaliq
UZT (UTC+5)	Boakye 47'; ?	Report (in Uzbek)	Qahramonov 37', 73'; Kolaković 38' (o.g.); Andreyev 90+1' (o.g.)	Stadium: OKMK; Referee: Ibrohim Ismoilov

7 October 2023 4	Nasaf	2–0	Neftchi	Qarshi
UZT (UTC+5)	Jighauri 52'; Chaves	Report (in Uzbek)		Stadium: Qarshi; Referee: Temurbek Toʻxtasinov

8 October 2023 5	Andijon	1–0	Paxtakor	Andijon
UZT (UTC+5)	Hebay 84'	Report (in Uzbek)		Stadium: Bobur; Referee: Komiljon Rasulov

8 October 2023 6	Buxoro	0–3	Navbahor	Andijon
UZT (UTC+5)		Report (in Uzbek)	Iskanderov 33'; Sobirjonov 88'; Abduxoliqov 90+3'	Stadium: Bobur; Referee: Komiljon Rasulov

19 November 2023 7	Surxon	1–0	Olimpik	Toshkent
UZT (UTC+5)	Jamalutdinov 50'	Report (in Uzbek)		Stadium: Paxtakor; Referee: Firdavs Norsafarov

=== Round 22 ===
12 October 2023 1	Qizilqum	1–2	AGMK	Navoiy
UZT (UTC+5)	Kenjaboyev 28'	Report (in Uzbek)	Sanches 50'; Hasanov 68'	Stadium: Yoshlar; Referee: Sultonmurod Abdurahmonov

20 October 2023 2	Metallurg	0–0	Buxoro	Olmaliq
UZT (UTC+5)		Report (in Uzbek)		Stadium: OKMK; Referee: Rahimbek Karimov

20 October 2023 3	Paxtakor	3–0	Turon	Toshkent
UZT (UTC+5)	Saitov 15'; Erkinov 71'; Sobirxoʻjayev 85'	Report (in Uzbek)		Stadium: Paxtakor; Referee: Rahimbek Karimov

21 October 2023 4	Olimpik	1–1	Bunyodkor	Toshkent
UZT (UTC+5)	Jaloliddinov 29'	Report (in Uzbek)	Ergashev 80'	Stadium: Jar; Referee: Aziz Asimov

21 October 2023 5	Soʻgʻdiyona	1–2	Andijon	Jizzax
UZT (UTC+5)	Doriyev 17'	Report (in Uzbek)	Hebaj 78'; Sohibjonov 86'	Stadium: Soʻgʻdiyona; Referee: Rustam Choriyev

22 October 2023 6	Neftchi	2–1	Surxon	Toshkent
UZT (UTC+5)	Adhamzoda 33'	Report (in Uzbek)	Hamidjonov 45+1'	Stadium: Jar; Referee: Shavkat Nasibullayev

30 October 2023 7	Buxoro	2–1	Paxtakor	Buxoro
UZT (UTC+5)		Report (in Uzbek)	Ćeran 90+6'	Stadium: Buxoro; Referee: Ravshan Abduvohidov

=== Round 23 ===
26 October 2023 1	Olimpik	0–0	Qizilqum	Toshkent
UZT (UTC+5)		Report (in Uzbek)		Stadium: Jar; Referee: Akobirxoʻja Shukurullayev

26 October 2023 2	Turon	1–0	Soʻgʻdiyona	Fargʻona
UZT (UTC+5)	Muxtorov 58'	Report (in Uzbek)		Stadium: Uzbekistan; Referee: Ilgiz Tantashev

27 October 2023 3	Surxon	1–2	Navbahor	Toshkent
UZT (UTC+5)	Hamidjonov 82'	Report (in Uzbek)	Abdumannopov 2'; Oʻrunov 82'	Stadium: Paxtakor; Referee: Temurbek Toʻxtasinov

27 October 2023 4	Nasaf	2–0	Metallurg	Qarshi
UZT (UTC+5)	Bozorov 35'; Nurulloyev 70'	Report (in Uzbek)		Stadium: Qarshi; Referee: Ahrol Risqullayev

28 October 2023 5	Andijon	0–1	AGMK	Andijon
UZT (UTC+5)	Gʻiyosov 18'	Report (in Uzbek)		Stadium: Bobur; Referee: Ahrol Risqullayev

28 October 2023 6	Bunyodkor	2–1	Neftchi	Toshkent
UZT (UTC+5)	Hakimov 54'; Sultonov 58'	Report (in Uzbek)	Joʻraboyev 90+6'	Stadium: Jar; Referee: Firdavs Norsafarov

30 October 2023 7	Navbahor	0–1	Nasaf	Namangan
UZT (UTC+5)		Report (in Uzbek)	Lima 73'	Stadium: Navbahor; Referee: Asker Najafaliyev

=== Round 24 ===
1 November 2023 1	AGMK	2–1	Turon	Olmaliq
UZT (UTC+5)	Gʻiyosov 38'; Ermatov 45+2'	Report (in Uzbek)	Azimov 6'	Stadium: OKMK; Referee: Rahimbek Karimov

2 November 2023 2	Qizilqum	3–0	Andijon	Navoiy
UZT (UTC+5)	Shulaia 12'; Gʻiyosov 33', 70'	Report (in Uzbek)		Stadium: Yoshlar; Referee: Firdavs Norsafarov

3 November 2023 3	Paxtakor	1–1	Nasaf	Toshkent
UZT (UTC+5)	Erkinov 79'	Report (in Uzbek)	Nasrullayev 81'	Stadium: Paxtakor; Referee: Ilgiz Tantashev

3 November 2023 4	Neftchi	0–1	Olimpik	Fargʻona
UZT (UTC+5)		Report (in Uzbek)	Odilov 78'	Stadium: Istiqlol; Referee: Abdurashid Xudoyberganov

4 November 2023 5	Metallurg	0–1	Surxon	Olmaliq
UZT (UTC+5)		Report (in Uzbek)	Jamalutdinov 55'	Stadium: OKMK; Referee: Olim Toʻychiboyev

4 November 2023 6	Soʻgʻdiyona	0–1	Buxoro	Jizzax
UZT (UTC+5)	Doriyev 67'	Report (in Uzbek)		Stadium: Soʻgʻdiyona; Referee: Shavkat Nasibullayev

11 November 2023 7	Navbahor	3–0	Bunyodkor	Namangan
UZT (UTC+5)	Tabatadze 10'; Đokić 23', 84'	Report (in Uzbek)		Stadium: Navbahor; Referee: Sultonmurod Abdurahmonov

=== Round 25 ===
22 November 2023 1	Turon	1–3	Andijon	Fargʻona
UZT (UTC+5)	Muxtorov 32'	Report (in Uzbek)	Azimov 17'; Mamatkazin 40'; Abdunabiyev	Stadium: Uzbekistan; Referee: Rustam Lutfullin

22 November 2023 2	Buxoro	0–1	AGMK	Buxoro
UZT (UTC+5)		Report (in Uzbek)	Tursunov 50'	Stadium: Buxoro; Referee: Ahrol Risqullayev

23 November 2023 3	Bunyodkor	1–0	Metallurg	Toshkent
UZT (UTC+5)	Hakimov 65'	Report (in Uzbek)		Stadium: Bunyodkor; Referee: Ahrol Risqullayev

23 November 2023 4	Neftchi	1–0	Qizilqum	Qarshi
UZT (UTC+5)	Nikabadze 17'	Report (in Uzbek)		Stadium: Istiqlol; Referee: Gʻayrat Joʻrayev

23 November 2023 5	Nasaf	0–0	Soʻgʻdiyona	Qarshi
UZT (UTC+5)		Report (in Uzbek)		Stadium: Qarshi; Referee: Gʻayrat Joʻrayev

24 November 2023 6	Olimpik	2–1	Navbahor	Toshkent
UZT (UTC+5)	Ibrohimov 44'; Esanov 87'	Report (in Uzbek)	Tabatadze 89'	Stadium: Jar; Referee: Rahimbek Karimov

24 November 2023 7	Surxon	1–2	Paxtakor	Toshkent
UZT (UTC+5)	Nimely 66'	Report (in Uzbek)	Saitov 53'; Turgʻunboyev 72'	Stadium: Paxtakor; Referee: Shavkat Nasibullayev

=== Round 26 ===
1 December 2023 1	Qizilqum	1–0	Turon	Navoiy
UZT (UTC+5)	Asadov 38'	Report (in Uzbek)		Stadium: Yoshlar; Referee: Doston Rahmonov

1 December 2023 2	Metallurg	2–1	Olimpik	Toshkent
UZT (UTC+5)	G‘afurov 10', 64'	Report (in Uzbek)	Jaloliddinov 87'	Stadium: Jar; Referee: Ilya Ilyin

1 December 2023 3	Andijon	1–0	Buxoro	Andijon
UZT (UTC+5)	Abdunabiyev 10'	Report (in Uzbek)		Stadium: Bobur; Referee: Doston Mirzaraimov

1 December 2023 4	Soʻgʻdiyona	0–2	Surxon	Jizzax
UZT (UTC+5)		Report (in Uzbek)	Hamidjonov 52'; Nimely 77'	Stadium: Soʻgʻdiyona; Referee: Xushnud Suyunboyev

1 December 2023 5	AGMK	1–1	Nasaf	Olmaliq
UZT (UTC+5)	Hasanov 53'	Report (in Uzbek)	Mozgovoy 66'	Stadium: OKMK; Referee: Temurbek Toʻxtasinov

1 December 2023 6	Navbahor	1–1	Neftchi	Namangan
UZT (UTC+5)	Milović 53'	Report (in Uzbek)	Gʻofurov 39'	Stadium: Navbahor; Referee: Sami Aljurays

1 December 2023 7	Paxtakor	2–3	Bunyodkor	Toshkent
UZT (UTC+5)	Xoldorxonov 14'; Ćeran 46'	Report (in Uzbek)	Abdurahmonov 34'; Taira 37'; Muhammadjonov 59'	Stadium: Paxtakor; Referee: Aziz Asimov

== Results ==
=== Results table ===
Home \ Away	AGM	AND	BUN	BUX	MET	NAS	NAV	NEF	OLY	PAK	QIZ	SOG	SUR	TUR
AGMK	—	2–1	2–3	3–1	2–4	1–1	2–1	1–1	2–1	1–2	4–0	3–2	2–3	2–1
Andijon	0–1	—	0–3	1–0	5–0	0–0	2–1	0–2	2–1	1–0	2–0	1–2	0–0	2–1
Bunyodkor	1–1	2–1	—	1–2	1–0	1–1	1–5	2–1	1–1	1–2	2–2	0–2	0–1	0–0
Buxoro	0–1	0–1	0–2	—	1–0	0–1	0–3	2–2	0–1	0–1	1–0	0–2	1–1	2–3
Metallurg	2–0	2–0	1–1	0–0	—	1–2	1–1	0–3	2–1	1–3	1–0	3–1	0–1	1–1
Nasaf	2–0	0–1	0–1	1–0	2–0	—	0–0	2–0	3–0	0–0	0–0	0–0	3–2	2–1
Navbahor	0–0	1–0	3–0	1–0	3–0	0–1	—	1–1	2–1	1–2	3–0	3–0	1–0	5–0
Neftchi	2–2	0–0	1–0	3–0	1–0	2–1	0–0	—	0–1	2–1	1–0	0–0	1–1	1–1
Olympic	0–1	0–1	1–1	1–0	1–2	1–3	2–1	0–0	—	0–2	0–0	3–3	1–1	2–0
Pakhtakor	2–2	1–1	2–3	1–0	1–0	1–1	2–1	0–1	2–3	—	3–1	2–1	1–0	3–0
Qizilqum	1–2	3–0	2–0	1–0	0–2	1–1	1–2	1–1	0–1	2–3	—	4–2	0–0	1–0
Sogdiana	1–2	1–2	0–1	1–0	2–2	1–2	2–1	0–2	2–2	1–1	1–0	—	0–2	2–0
Surkhon	1–3	1–0	1–0	2–0	1–0	1–2	1–2	2–2	1–0	1–2	1–2	1–0	—	1–0
Turon	1–1	1–3	1–2	1–2	1–1	1–0	0–2	0–3	0–1	0–1	0–0	1–0	1–1	—

Source: Uzbekistan Professional Football League
Legend: Blue = home team win; Yellow = draw; Red = away team win.

=== Results by match played ===
Team ╲ Round	1	2	3	4	5	6	7	8	9	10	11	12	13	14	15	16	17	18	19	20	21	22	23	24	25	26
AGMK	W	L	W	D	W	L	L	W	W	D	W	L	W	L	D	W	D	D	L	D	W	W	W	W	W	D
Andijon	W	L	L	W	L	L	W	L	L	W	W	W	D	D	D	L	W	D	W	L	W	W	L	L	W	W
Bunyodkor	W	W	W	D	W	D	L	D	L	L	D	L	L	L	D	W	W	L	W	L	D	D	W	L	W	W
Buxoro	W	L	L	L	L	L	D	W	L	L	L	L	L	L	W	L	D	W	L	L	L	D	L	L	L	L
Metallurg	L	L	W	L	D	W	L	L	L	L	D	W	D	L	D	W	L	W	W	W	D	D	L	L	L	W
Nasaf	L	W	W	D	W	D	W	D	W	D	W	W	L	D	L	W	D	W	L	W	W	W	W	D	D	D
Navbahor	W	W	L	W	L	W	W	D	W	W	W	D	W	W	D	L	L	D	L	W	W	L	W	W	L	D
Neftchi	W	W	W	D	W	D	D	D	W	D	D	D	W	W	W	D	D	D	W	W	L	D	L	L	W	D
Olympic	W	D	L	L	W	W	L	D	W	D	L	L	D	L	D	L	L	W	W	L	L	D	D	W	W	L
Pakhtakor	L	L	W	W	W	W	W	W	W	D	W	W	D	W	L	W	W	W	D	D	L	W	W	D	W	L
Qizilqum	L	W	L	D	L	D	L	L	L	L	D	D	W	L	L	L	D	L	W	W	D	L	D	W	L	W
Sogdiana	L	D	L	L	D	L	W	W	W	W	L	L	L	W	D	D	W	L	D	L	L	L	L	W	D	L
Surkhon	L	W	D	W	L	D	W	D	L	W	L	W	D	W	D	W	D	L	L	W	W	D	L	W	L	W
Turon	L	L	D	D	L	D	L	L	L	D	L	D	D	W	W	L	L	L	L	L	D	L	W	L	L	L

Source: Championat.asia
W = Win; D = Draw; L = Loss; P = Postponed

=== Positions by round ===
Team ╲ Round	1	2	3	4	5	6	7	8	9	10	11	12	13	14	15	16	17	18	19	20	21	22	23	24	25	26
AGMK	3	5	4	4	3	6	7	6	5	5	5	5	5	5	5	5	5	5	5	5	5	5	4	4	4	4
Andijon	6	8	10	8	9	10	9	9	10	10	7	6	6	7	7	7	7	7	6	6	6	6	6	7	7	7
Bunyodkor	7	3	2	2	2	2	4	4	6	6	6	8	8	9	9	8	8	8	8	8	8	8	8	8	8	8
Buxoro	5	6	9	11	12	13	13	11	11	11	12	12	13	14	13	13	13	12	12	12	13	13	14	14	14	14
Metallurg	13	14	12	12	11	9	10	12	12	12	11	11	11	11	11	11	11	11	10	9	9	9	9	10	10	10
Nasaf	11	7	5	6	4	5	5	5	4	4	4	3	4	4	4	4	4	4	4	4	3	3	2	2	2	2
Navbahor	1	1	3	3	5	3	1	2	2	1	1	2	1	1	1	2	2	2	2	2	2	2	3	3	3	3
Neftchi	2	2	1	1	1	1	2	3	3	3	3	4	3	3	2	3	3	3	3	3	4	4	5	5	5	5
Olympic	4	4	6	9	8	7	8	8	7	8	9	9	9	10	10	10	10	10	11	11	11	11	11	9	9	9
Pakhtakor	8	12	8	7	6	4	3	1	1	2	2	1	2	2	3	1	1	1	1	1	1	1	1	1	1	1
Qizilqum	14	10	11	10	10	11	12	13	13	13	13	13	12	12	14	14	14	14	13	13	12	12	12	12	12	12
Sogdiana	10	11	14	14	14	14	11	10	9	9	10	10	10	8	8	9	9	9	9	10	10	10	10	11	11	11
Surkhon	12	9	7	5	7	8	6	7	8	7	8	7	7	6	6	6	6	6	7	7	7	7	7	6	6	6
Turon	9	13	13	13	13	12	14	14	14	14	14	14	14	13	12	12	12	13	14	14	14	14	13	13	13	13

Leader and qualification to AFC Champions League group stage
Qualification to AFC Champions League group stage
Qualification to the AFC Champions League preliminary round
Relegation to Uzbekistan Pro League#Relegation play off
Relegation to Uzbekistan Pro League

Updated to match(es) played on 1 December 2023. Source: Uzbekistan Professional Football League

=== 2023 Uzbekistan U19 Championship under Super League resuts ===
Uzbekistan U19 Championship
- Season: 2023
- Champions: Metallurg U19
- Matches: 300
- Goals: 1,284 (4.28 per match)
- Top goalscorer: Behruz Oblaqulov (Mashʼal, 29)
- Biggest home win: Nasaf U19 10:0 Andijon U19 (9 June 2023)
- Biggest away win: Olimpik U19 0:6 Shoʻrtan U19 (23 August 2023)
- Highest scoring: Navbahor U19 10:1 Olimpik U19 (16 August 2023)
- Highest attendance: 483 (31 October 2023, Nasaf U19 0:0 Mashʼal U19)
- Lowest attendance: 14 (1 June 2023, Soʻgʻdiyona U19 0:3 Mashʼal U19)

The fourth season of the tournament kicked off on 3 April. This season, players born in 2004 and later were registered.

#	Team Name	Game	Win	Draw	Loss	Goal difference	Points
1	Metallurg U19	24	18	2	4	70-35	56
2	Nasaf U19	24	16	7	1	81-23	55
3	Mashʼal U19	24	17	4	3	71-26	55
4	Lokomotiv U19	24	17	3	4	72-26	54
5	Shoʻrtan U19	24	16	5	3	58-27	53
6	Bunyodkor U19	24	13	5	6	73-29	44
7	Neftchi U19	24	13	5	6	74-49	44
8	Paxtakor U19	24	13	4	7	58-40	43
9	Andijon SGS U19	24	12	3	9	42-43	39
10	Kokand 1912 U19	24	11	4	9	50-42	37
11	Navbahor Farm U19	24	8	11	5	45-28	35
12	Navbahor U19	24	10	5	9	57-44	35
13	Surxon U19	24	11	2	11	40-45	35
14	Soʻgʻdiyona U19	24	9	5	10	43-44	32
15	Turon U19	24	8	4	12	49-58	28
16	Dinamo U19	24	8	3	13	44-56	27
17	Buxoro U19	24	8	3	13	47-63	27
18	Xorazm U19	24	6	7	11	39-53	25
19	Qizilqum U19	24	7	3	14	43-53	24
20	Andijon U19	24	7	2	15	34-65	23
21	OKMK U19	24	6	3	15	33-60	21
22	Olimpik U19	24	6	3	15	46-87	21
23	Yunired U19	24	4	2	18	31-70	14
24	Gʻijduvon U19	24	4	1	19	31-99	13
25	Aral U19	24	3	2	19	19-85	11

=== 2023 Uzbekistan U21 Championship under Super League results ===
Uzbekistan U21 Championship
- Season: 2023
- Champions: Paxtakor U21
- Matches: 182
- Goals: 873 (4.8 per match)
- Top goalscorer: Behruz Abdullayev (13)
- Biggest home win: Neftchi U21 7:0 Buxoro U21 (28 September 2023)
- Biggest away win: Metallurg U21 0:5 Paxtakor U21 (3 April 2023)
- Highest scoring: Kokand 1912 U21 4:7 Neftchi U21 (3 August 2022)
- Highest attendance: 648 (31 August 2023, Metallurg U21 5:1 Soʻgʻdiyona U21)

#	Team	Game	Win	Draw	Loss	Goals ratio	Points
1	Paxtakor U21	26	18	3	5	76-33	57
2	Olimpik U21	26	17	5	4	67-38	56
3	Nasaf U21	26	15	8	3	48-29	53
4	Metallurg U21	26	14	4	8	50-35	46
5	Bunyodkor U21	26	12	5	9	47-37	41
6	Surxon U21	26	9	8	9	39-36	35
7	Neftchi U21	26	10	4	12	42-43	34
8	Turon U21	26	10	4	12	39-52	34
9	AGMK U21	26	9	6	11	44-48	33
10	Qizilqum U21	26	8	9	9	32-40	33
11	Buxoro U21	26	9	2	15	35-56	29
12	Andijon U21	26	4	9	13	25-44	21
13	Soʻgʻdiyona U21	26	6	3	17	39-62	21
14	Navbahor U21	26	5	2	19	28-58	17

== Season statistics ==
- First goal of the season: Ruslanbek Jiyanov for Olympic Tashkent against Pakhtakor Tashkent (3 March 2023)

=== Goalscorers ===
As of match played 1 December 2023

Rank	Player	Club	Goals
1	(Serbia) Dragan Ćeran	Pakhtakor Tashkent	13
2	(Albania) Rubin Hebaj	Andijon	12
2	(Liberia) Sylvanus Nimely	Surkhon Termez	12
4	(Uzbekistan) Oston Urunov	Navbahor Namangan	9
4	(Uzbekistan) Khursid Giyosov	AGMK	9
4	(Georgia (country)) Toma Tabatadze	Neftchi Fergana/ Navbahor Namangan	9
7	(Belgium) Dženan Zajmović	Sogdiana Jizzakh	8
7	(Uzbekistan) Islom Kenjaboev	Qizilqum Zarafshon	8
9	(Uzbekistan) Zabikhillo Urinboev	Metallurg Bekabad	7
10	(Uzbekistan) Javohir Qahramonov	Sogdiana Jizzakh	6
10	(Italy) Martin Boakye	AGMK	6
10	(Uzbekistan) Alisher Odilov	Olympic Tashkent	6
10	(Uzbekistan) Jasur Hakimov	Bunyodkor	6

=== Hat-tricks ===
Player	For	Against	Result	Date	Ref
(Serbia) Dragan Ćeran	Pakhtakor Tashkent	Metallurg Bekabad	3–1	2 April 2023	
(Albania) Rubin Hebaj	Andijon	Metallurg Bekabad	5–0	24 April 2023	

=== Clean sheets ===
As of match played 1 December 2023

Rank	Player	Club	Goals
1	(Uzbekistan) Utkir Yusupov	Navbahor Namangan	13
2	(Russia) Artyom Potapov	Surkhon Termez	11
3	(Uzbekistan) Vladimir Nazarov	Neftchi Fergana	9
3	(Uzbekistan) Abduvohid Nematov	Nasaf	9
3	(Ukraine) Ihor Lytovka	Andijon	9
6	(Uzbekistan) Javohir Ilyosov	Qizilqum Zarafshon	7
6	(Uzbekistan) Khamidullo Abdunabiev	Olympic	7
6	(Serbia) Milan Mitrović	Sogdiana Jizzakh	7
9	(Uzbekistan) Sanjar Kuvvatov	Pakhtakor Tashkent	6
10	(Uzbekistan) Akmal Ortikov	Metallurg Bekabad	5
10	(Uzbekistan) Umidjon Ergashev	Nasaf	5

=== Attendances ===
As of match played 1 December 2023

==== By round ====
2023 Uzbekistan Super League Attendance
Round	Total	GP.	Avg. Per Game
Round 1	33,017	7	4,717
Round 2	39,960	7	5,709
Round 3	24,038	7	3,434
Round 4	32,409	7	4,630
Round 5	26,939	7	3,848
Round 6	33,079	7	4,726
Round 7	28,418	7	4,060
Round 8	37,022	7	5,289
Round 9	33,693	7	4,813
Round 10	35,353	7	5,050
Round 11	37,077	7	5,297
Round 12	29,255	7	4,179
Round 13	29,997	7	4,285
Round 14	38,850	7	5,550
Round 15	38,373	7	5,482
Round 16	53,908	7	7,701
Round 17	32,394	7	4,628
Round 18	35,759	7	5,108
Round 19	28,952	7	5,790
Round 20	32,460	7	4,637
Round 21	30,017	7	5,003
Round 22	32,795	7	4,685
Round 23	22,475	7	3,211
Round 24	32,757	7	4,680
Round 25	21,136	7	3,019
Round 26	15,560	7	2,223
Total	827,145	181	4,570

==== By team ====
Team \ Match played	1	2	3	4	5	6	7	8	9	10	11	12	13	Total	Average
AGMK	279	3,745	4,400	408	723	402	1,010	8,088	4,256	2,345	2,430	1,235	1,611	30,932	2,379
Andijon	2,135	8,450	1,051	2,605	3,227	961	13,217	12,801	8,912	15,231	10,584	12,607	0	91,781	7,060
Bunyodkor	999	3,203	12,012	4,073	1,021	1,198	1,005	2,135	1,624	856	2,321	1,320	315	32,082	2,468
Buxoro	8,123	8,153	8,725	8,200	6,800	3,895	7,996	6,616	6,327	6,052	1,256	1,245	2,971	76,359	5,874
Metallurg	6,623	2,803	5,201	4,582	4,321	4,509	4,322	2,138	2,225	762	560	423	173	38,642	2,972
Nasaf	5,005	3,021	2,218	5,001	7,571	3,120	2,179	4,416	15,107	4,905	6,124	3,981	2,752	65,400	5,031
Navbahor	11,707	12,132	13,950	16,250	10,200	15,816	9,323	25,260	7,582	7,057	15,227	8,883	10,608	163,995	12,615
Neftchi	17,103	7,720	5,345	14,414	19,191	13,800	8,345	14,600	19,316	12,452	12,107	6,821	5,866	157,080	12,083
Olympic	212	410	286	4,404	413	879	1,493	2,124	561	1,641	853	153	853	14,282	1,099
Pakhtakor	2,350	7,748	1,010	1,082	3,216	317	808	10,200	1,823	5,377	218	12,365	426	46,940	3,611
Qizilqum	5,614	3,471	2,331	3,852	2,925	1,254	5,591	1,120	3,428	4,315	2,879	2,061	1,973	40,814	2,885
Sogdiana	1,438	1,035	1,015	1,052	989	2,453	5,505	1,630	2,755	2,594	951	969	769	23,155	1,781
Surkhon	373	776	658	558	557	341	354	526	1,023	681	2,022	570	6,063	14,502	1,116
Turon Yaypan	5,521	2,002	2,311	7,694	2,340	3,125	2,003	3,489	3,905	1,936	1,136	1,951	2,316	39,729	3,056

== See also ==
- 2023 Uzbekistan Pro League
- 2023 Uzbekistan First League
- 2023 Uzbekistan Second League
- 2023 Uzbekistan Cup
- 2023 Uzbekistan League Cup
