= 2023 Pakhtakor Tashkent FK season =

Pakhtakor Tashkent
2023 season
- President: Bobur Shodiev
- Manager: Maksim Shatskikh
- Uzbek League: Champions
- Uzbekistan Cup: Round of 16 vs Dinamo Samarqand
- AFC Champions League: Group Stage
- Top goalscorer: League: Dragan Ćeran (13); All: Dragan Ćeran (17)
- Highest home attendance: 12,365 vs Nasaf (3 November 2023)
- Lowest home attendance: 218 vs Turon (20 October 2023)
- Average home league attendance: 3,694 (1 December 2023)
Home colours	Away colours

The 2023 season was Pakhtakor Tashkent's 32nd season in the Uzbek League in Uzbekistan.

== Season events ==
On 27 December 2022, Sardor Sabirkhodjaev extended his contract with Pakhtakor until the end of the 2024 season and Abbosbek Fayzullaev extended his contract until the end of the 2025 season. The following day, 28 December 2022, Dostonbek Tursunov extended his contract with Pakhtakor for the 2023 season, Khojiakbar Alijonov extended his contract until the end of the 2024 season.

On 3 January, Pakhtakor announced the signings of Giorgi Papava from AGMK, and Dilshod Saitov from Nasaf.

On 15 February, Pakhtakor announced the return of Sardor Rashidov on a free transfer from Umm Salal

On 4 July, Pakhtakor Tashkent announced the year-long loan signing of Khojimat Erkinov from Torpedo Moscow.

On 7 July, Pakhtakor Tashkent announced that Otabek Boymurodov had extended his contract with the club until the end of 2025.

On 14 July, Pakhtakor Tashkent announced the signing of free-agent Michał Kucharczyk to an 18-month long contract.

On 21 July, Pakhtakor Tashkent announced the signing of Kai Merk from Union Titus Pétange.

On 28 July, Pakhtakor Tashkent announced the signings of Matthew Steenvoorden and Pavel Pavlyuchenko.

On 4 August, Abbosbek Fayzullaev left the club to join CSKA Moscow.

== Squad ==
As of match played 5 December 2023

No.	Name	Nationality	Position	Date of birth (age)	Signed from	Signed in	Contract ends	Apps.	Goals
Goalkeepers
1	Nikita Shevchenko	(Uzbekistan)	GK	27 November 2003 (aged 20)	Unattached	2023		0	0
21	Otabek Boymurodov	(Uzbekistan)	GK	5 June 2003 (aged 20)	Academy	2022	2025	0	0
33	Eldorbek Suyunov	(Uzbekistan)	GK	12 April 1991 (aged 32)	Nasaf	2017		106	0
35	Sanjar Kuvvatov	(Uzbekistan)	GK	8 January 1990 (aged 33)	Nasaf	2019		108	0
36	Pavel Pavlyuchenko	(Belarus)	GK	1 January 1998 (aged 25)	Bruk-Bet Termalica Nieciecza	2023		9	0
43	Maksim Murkayev	(Uzbekistan)	GK	21 February 2005 (aged 18)	Academy	2023		0	0
50	Aliy Murodjonov	(Uzbekistan)	GK	7 December 2005 (aged 17)	Academy	2023		0	0
75	Shahzod Suyunov	(Uzbekistan)	GK	5 August 2000 (aged 23)	Academy	2023		0	0
Defenders
3	Khojiakbar Alijonov	(Uzbekistan)	DF	19 April 1997 (aged 26)	Academy	2017		177	9
4	Dostonbek Tursunov	(Uzbekistan)	DF	13 June 1995 (aged 28)	Chongqing Liangjiang Athletic	2022		24	2
5	Mukhammadkodir Khamraliev	(Uzbekistan)	DF	6 July 2001 (aged 22)	Dinamo Samarqand	2023		24	1
12	Sunnatilla Poyonov	(Uzbekistan)	DF	16 June 2004 (aged 19)	Academy	2023		2	0
20	Abubakir Ashurov	(Uzbekistan)	DF	12 June 2003 (aged 20)	Academy	2023		0	0
23	Sherzod Azamov	(Uzbekistan)	DF	14 January 1990 (aged 33)	Nasaf	2017		139	3
24	Kirill Todorov	(Uzbekistan)	DF	24 May 2004 (aged 19)	Academy	2023		1	1
30	Matthew Steenvoorden	(Netherlands)	DF	9 January 1993 (aged 30)	HNK Gorica	2023		10	0
34	Farrukh Sayfiev	(Uzbekistan)	DF	17 January 1991 (aged 32)	Nasaf	2018		198	11
37	Sarvarbek Adhamov	(Uzbekistan)	DF	18 May 2005 (aged 18)	Academy	2023		0	0
38	Temur Odilov	(Uzbekistan)	DF	12 October 2005 (aged 18)	Academy	2023		0	0
42	Muhammadali Zohidov	(Uzbekistan)	DF	27 August 2005 (aged 18)	Academy	2023		0	0
45	Rustam Pazilov	(Uzbekistan)	DF	12 April 2003 (aged 20)	Academy	2023		0	0
46	Alisher Mo'minov	(Uzbekistan)	DF	12 April 2003 (aged 20)	Academy	2023		0	0
55	Mukhammadrasul Abdumazhidov	(Uzbekistan)	DF	23 July 2004 (aged 19)	Academy	2023		4	0
77	Dilshod Saitov	(Uzbekistan)	DF	2 February 1999 (aged 24)	Nasaf	2023		29	2
88	Shahzod Azmiddinov	(Uzbekistan)	DF	7 August 2000 (aged 23)	Academy	2020		61	3
Midfielders
2	Behruzbek Askarov	(Uzbekistan)	MF	8 March 2003 (aged 20)	Academy	2023		14	0
6	Mukhammadali Urinboev	(Uzbekistan)	MF	24 April 2005 (aged 18)	Academy	2021		19	1
7	Odiljon Hamrobekov	(Uzbekistan)	MF	13 February 1996 (aged 27)	Shabab Al Ahli	2021		140	3
8	Azizbek Turgunboev	(Uzbekistan)	MF	1 October 1994 (aged 29)	Navbahor Namangan	2021		103	17
9	Michał Kucharczyk	(Poland)	MF	20 March 1991 (aged 32)	Unattached	2023	2024	4	0
17	Dostonbek Khamdamov	(Uzbekistan)	MF	24 July 1996 (aged 27)	Al-Nasr	2021	2022	139	30
18	Saidumarxon Saidnurullaev	(Uzbekistan)	MF	13 April 2005 (aged 18)	Academy	2023		2	0
20	Khojimat Erkinov	(Uzbekistan)	MF	29 May 2001 (aged 22)	on loan from Torpedo Moscow	2023	2024	75	17
27	Sardor Sabirkhodjaev	(Uzbekistan)	MF	6 November 1994 (aged 29)	Bunyodkor	2019		173	13
28	Diyor Kholmatov	(Uzbekistan)	MF	22 July 2002 (aged 21)	Youth Team	2020		80	4
29	Muhriddin Pazildinov	(Uzbekistan)	MF	9 April 2004 (aged 19)	Academy	2023		1	0
30	Shahzodbek Rahmatullayev	(Uzbekistan)	MF	7 May 2003 (aged 20)	Academy	2023		0	0
31	Mukhammadali Usmonov	(Uzbekistan)	MF	9 December 2004 (aged 18)	Academy	2023		2	0
32	Asadbek Beglarxonov	(Uzbekistan)	MF	1 April 2004 (aged 19)	Academy	2023		0	0
40	Kimi Merk	(Kyrgyzstan)	MF	6 July 2004 (aged 19)	Kaiserslautern II	2023		8	0
41	Diyorbek Ortiqboyev	(Uzbekistan)	MF	6 January 2003 (aged 20)	Academy	2021		1	0
42	Rustambek Fomin	(Uzbekistan)	MF	9 July 2005 (aged 18)	Academy	2023		0	0
44	Daler Tuxsanov	(Uzbekistan)	MF	11 April 2005 (aged 18)	Academy	2023		0	0
51	Nodirxon Habibullayev	(Uzbekistan)	MF	16 January 2004 (aged 19)	Academy	2023		0	0
52	Nurlan Ibraimov	(Uzbekistan)	MF	29 August 2005 (aged 18)	Academy	2023		1	0
62	Danat Miftaxutdinov	(Uzbekistan)	MF	17 September 2003 (aged 20)	Academy	2023		0	0
73	Dilshod Abdullayev	(Uzbekistan)	MF	9 May 2005 (aged 18)	Academy	2023		0	0
90	Javokhir Alizhonov	(Uzbekistan)	MF	28 January 2000 (aged 23)	Academy	2023		2	0
Forwards
10	Dragan Ćeran	(Serbia)	FW	6 October 1987 (aged 36)	Nasaf	2018		187	125
11	Po'latkhoja Kholdorkhonov	(Uzbekistan)	FW	6 July 2003 (aged 20)	Academy	2021	2023	33	4
19	Przemysław Banaszak	(Poland)	FW	10 May 1997 (aged 26)	Górnik Łęczna	2022		29	6
36	Abbos Ergashboev	(Uzbekistan)	FW	28 March 2003 (aged 20)	Academy	2022		4	1
99	Akbar O'ktamov	(Uzbekistan)	FW	11 February 2004 (aged 19)	Academy	2023		0	0
Players away on loan
16	Rustam Turdimurodov	(Uzbekistan)	FW	4 April 2004 (aged 19)	Academy	2022		6	0
	Mirzhakhon Mirakhmadov	(Uzbekistan)	FW	15 July 1997 (aged 26)	Bunyodkor	2022		11	1
Players who left during the season
9	Sardor Rashidov	(Uzbekistan)	FW	14 June 1991 (aged 32)	Qatar	2021		26	3
14	Abbosbek Fayzullaev	(Uzbekistan)	MF	3 October 2003 (aged 20)	Youth Team	2021	2023	41	10
15	Giorgi Papava	(Georgia (country))	MF	16 February 1993 (aged 30)	AGMK	2023		3	0
46	Shahriyor Jabborov	(Uzbekistan)	MF	14 January 2003 (aged 20)	Academy	2022		6	0

== Transfers ==
=== In ===
Date	Position	Nationality	Name	From	Fee	Ref.
3 January 2023	DF	(Uzbekistan)	Dilshod Saitov	Nasaf	Free	
3 January 2023	MF	(Georgia (country))	Giorgi Papava	AGMK	Undisclosed	
15 February 2023	FW	(Uzbekistan)	Sardor Rashidov	Umm Salal	Free	
14 July 2023	MF	(Poland)	Michał Kucharczyk	Unattached	Free	
21 July 2023	MF	(Kyrgyzstan)	Kimi Merk	Kaiserslautern II	Undisclosed	
28 July 2023	GK	(Belarus)	Pavel Pavlyuchenko	Bruk-Bet Termalica Nieciecza	Undisclosed	
28 July 2023	DF	(Netherlands)	Matthew Steenvoorden	HNK Gorica	Undisclosed	

=== Loans in ===
Start date	Position	Nationality	Name	From	End date	Ref.
4 July 2022	MF	(Uzbekistan)	Khojimat Erkinov	Torpedo Moscow	30 June 2024	

=== Loans out ===
Start date	Position	Nationality	Name	To	End date	Ref.
18 July 2022	MF	(Uzbekistan)	Mirzhakhon Mirakhmadov	AGMK	31 December 2023	

=== Out ===
Date	Position	Nationality	Name	To	Fee	Ref.
1 January 2023	MF	(Uzbekistan)	Ikromjon Alibaev	Gangwon	Undisclosed	
4 August 2023	MF	(Uzbekistan)	Abbosbek Fayzullaev	CSKA Moscow	Undisclosed	

=== Released ===
Date	Position	Nationality	Name	Joined	Date	Ref
1 July 2023	FW	(Uzbekistan)	Sardor Rashidov	Dubai City	6 February 2024	
31 December 2023	GK	(Uzbekistan)	Eldorbek Suyunov	Navbahor	29 July 2024	
31 December 2023	DF	(Uzbekistan)	Sherzod Azamov	Retired	1 July 2024	
31 December 2023	DF	(Uzbekistan)	Dostonbek Tursunov	Esteghlal Khuzestan	15 February 2024	
31 December 2023	FW	(Poland)	Przemysław Banaszak	Górnik Łęczna	19 June 2024	

== Friendlies ==
17 January 2023	Pakhtakor Tashkent	0 – 3	Dnipro-1	Turkey
UZT (UTC+5)		Report	Goal

22 January 2023	Pakhtakor Tashkent	1 – 2	Vaduz	Turkey
UZT (UTC+5)	Fayzullaev 38'	Report	32'; 84'

5 February 2023	Pakhtakor Tashkent	1 – 0	Samgurali Tsqaltubo	Turkey
UZT (UTC+5)	Khamdamov	Report

5 February 2023	Pakhtakor Tashkent	5 – 2	Aksu	Turkey
UZT (UTC+5)	Banaszak 15'; Ćeran 19', 43', 58'; Khamdamov 70'	Report	Murza 30'; Iskakov 81'

8 February 2023	Pakhtakor Tashkent	4 – 1	Shkupi	Turkey
UZT (UTC+5)	Ćeran 34'; Banaszak 48', 66'; Turdimurodov 81'	Report	Goal

14 February 2023	Pakhtakor Tashkent	1 – 0	Dynamo Kyiv	Turkey
UZT (UTC+5)	Khamdamov 34'	Report

25 February 2023	Pakhtakor Tashkent	4 – 3	Kairat	Turkey
17:00 UZT (UTC+5)	Ćeran 4', 45'; Rashidov 58'; Alijonov 62'	Report	Alykulov 20'; João Paulo 50', 73'	Referee: I.Tantashev

16 July 2023	Pakhtakor Tashkent	2 – 1	Qizilqum Zarafshon	Tashkent, Uzbekistan
UZT (UTC+5)	Erkinov 20'; Kucharczyk 89' (pen.)	Report	Kenzhaboev 50' (pen.)

19 July 2023	Kairat	0 – 1	Pakhtakor Tashkent	Almaty, Kazakhstan
UZT (UTC+5)		Report	Banaszak 90+2'	Stadium: Central Stadium; Attendance: 13,000

23 July 2023	Pakhtakor Tashkent	1–2	Istiklol	Tashkent, Uzbekistan
20:00 UZT (UTC+5)	Kartashyan 31' (pen.); Sebai 78'	Report	Ćeran 32' (pen.)	Stadium: Pakhtakor Central Stadium

== Competitions ==
=== Overview ===
Competition	First match	Last match	Starting round	Final position	Record							
Competition	First match	Last match	Starting round	Final position	Pld	W	D	L	GF	GA	GD	Win %
Super League	3 March 2023	1 December 2023	Matchday 1	Winners	26	16	5	5	41	25	+16	61.54
Uzbekistan Cup	26 April 2023	1 August 2023	Group Stage	Round of 16	4	2	0	2	8	5	+3	50.00
Super Cup	24 August 2022		Final	Runner-up	1	0	0	1	1	2	−1	0.00
AFC Champions League	19 September 2023	5 December 2023	Group Stage	Group Stage	6	2	1	3	8	11	−3	33.33
Total					37	20	6	11	58	43	+15	54.05

Last updated: 5 December 2023
Source: Competitions

=== Super Cup ===
24 August 2023	Pakhtakor Tashkent	1 – 2	Nasaf	Jizzakh
19:30 UZT (UTC+5)	Banaszak 8'; Alijonov (yellow card) 23'	Report	Bozorov 42'; Stanojević 66'; Davronov (yellow card) 80'; (yellow card) 90+4'	Stadium: Sogdiana Stadium

=== Super League ===
==== League table ====
Pos	Team	Pld	W	D	L	GF	GA	GD	Pts	Qualification or relegation
1	Pakhtakor (C)	26	16	5	5	41	25	+16	53	Qualification for AFC Champions League Elite league stage
2	Nasaf	26	13	9	4	31	16	+15	48	Qualification for the AFC Champions League Two group stage
3	Navbahor	26	14	5	7	44	19	+25	47	
4	AGMK	26	13	7	6	43	34	+9	46	
5	Neftchi	26	11	12	3	33	18	+15	45	

Source: Uzbekistan Professional Football League
Rules for classification: 1) points; 2) head-to-head points; 3) head-to-head goal difference; 4) head-to-head away goals scored; 5) goal difference; 6) number of goals scored.
(C) Champions

==== Results summary ====
Overall								Home						Away					
Pld	W	D	L	GF	GA	GD	Pts	W	D	L	GF	GA	GD	W	D	L	GF	GA	GD
26	16	5	5	41	25	+16	53	7	3	3	21	14	+7	9	2	2	20	11	+9

Last updated: 1 December 2023.
Source: See Results

==== Results by round ====
Round	1	2	3	4	5	6	7	8	9	10	11	12	13	14	15	16	17	18	19	20	21	22	23	24	25	26
Ground	H	A	H	A	H	H	A	A (Note: matchday 9)	H (Note: matchday 10)	H (Note: matchday 12)	A (Note: matchday 13)	H (Note: matchday 8)	A (Note: matchday 14)	H (Note: matchday 15)	A (Note: matchday 16)	A (Note: matchday 11)	H	A	A	H	A	H	A	H	A	H
Result	L	L	W	W	W	W	W	W	W	W	W	D	W	L	W	D	W	W	D	D	L	W	W	D	W	L
Position	8	12	8	7	6	4	3	1	1	2	1	2	2	3	1	1	1	1	1	1	1	1	1	1	1	1

Source: See Results
A = Away; H = Home; W = Win; D = Draw; L = Loss

==== Results ====
3 March 2023 1	Pakhtakor Tashkent	2 – 3	Olympic Tashkent	Tashkent
18:30 UZT (UTC+5)	Hamrobekov (yellow card) 22'; Azmiddinov (yellow card) 45+3'; Ćeran (yellow card) 57'; Sayfiev 63'; Tursunov 83'	Report	Jiyanov 7' (pen.); Ibrohimov (yellow card) 45'; Odilov 49'; Shamsiyev (yellow card) 60'; Jaloliddinov (yellow card) 62'; Abdumajidov 79'; Toirov (yellow card) 90+4'	Stadium: Central Stadium; Attendance: 2,350; Referee: Aziz Asimov

10 March 2023 2	Neftchi Fergana	2 – 1	Pakhtakor Tashkent	Fergana
18:30 UZT (UTC+5)	Hoshimov (yellow card) 18'; Larin 52'; Ubaydullayev (yellow card) 59'; Tabatadze 81' (pen.)	Report	Hamrobekov (yellow card) 80'; Papava (yellow card) 85'; Tursunov 90+9' (yellow card) FT	Stadium: Istiqlol Stadium; Attendance: 17,103; Referee: Ilgiz Tantashev

17 March 2023 3	Pakhtakor Tashkent	2 – 1	Navbahor Namangan	Tashkent
19:30 UZT (UTC+5)	Sayfiev 2' (yellow card) 22'; Tursunov (yellow card) 6'; Hamrobekov (yellow card) 40'; Ćeran 68'; E.Suyunov (yellow card) 90+4'	Report	Abduxoliqov 22' (pen.); Urunov (yellow card) 28'; Đokić (yellow card) 32' (penalty missed) 90+4'; Čermelj (yellow card) 51'; Khashimov (red card) 80'; Boltaboev (yellow card) 90+6'	Stadium: Central Stadium; Attendance: 7,748; Referee: Vadim Agishev

2 April 2023 4	Metallurg Bekabad	1 – 3	Pakhtakor Tashkent	Bekabad
17:00 UZT (UTC+5)	Toshqo‘ziyev (yellow card) 51'; Gafurov 85' (pen.)	Report	Ćeran 41' (pen.), 69', 80' (pen.)	Stadium: Metallurg Bekabad Stadium; Attendance: 5,201; Referee: Firdavs Norsafarov

10 April 2023 5	Pakhtakor Tashkent	3 – 1	Qizilqum Zarafshon	Tashkent
18:05 UZT (UTC+5)	Fayzullaev 13'; Turgunboev 35'; Ćeran 74'	Report	Shukurillayev (yellow card) 62'; Nurmatov (red card) 66'; Toshpo'latov (yellow card) 88'; Mbaoma 89'	Stadium: Central Stadium; Attendance: 1,010; Referee: Shavkat Nasibullayev

15 April 2023 6	Pakhtakor Tashkent	2 – 1	Sogdiana Jizzakh	Tashkent
18:15 UZT (UTC+5)	Tursunov (red card) 7'; Fayzullaev 33' (yellow card) 70'; Ćeran 43' (pen.) (yellow card) 77'; Turgunboev (yellow card) 45+4'	Report	Salimov (yellow card) 30'; Kolaković (yellow card) 42'; Zajmović 90+5'	Stadium: Central Stadium; Attendance: 1,082; Referee: Rustam Lutfullin

22 April 2023 7	AGMK	1 – 2	Pakhtakor Tashkent	Olmaliq
18:10 UZT (UTC+5)	Sánchez (yellow card) 27'; Giyosov 49'	Report	Azmiddinov (yellow card) 35'; Ćeran (yellow card) 55' (goal) 65'; Hamraliyev (yellow card) 60'; Turgunboev 85'	Stadium: AGMK Stadium; Attendance: 4,400; Referee: Temur Tuhtasinov

6 May 2023 9	Turon	0 – 1	Pakhtakor Tashkent	Yaypan
19:00 UZT (UTC+5)	Murtozayev (penalty missed) 12'; Ahmedov (yellow card) 78'; Kumburović (yellow card) 78'	Report	Ćeran 40' (pen.); Sayfiev (yellow card) 68'	Stadium: Uzbekistan Stadium; Attendance: 2,340; Referee: Rustam Lutfullin

13 May 2023 10	Pakhtakor Tashkent	1 – 0	Bukhara	Tashkent
19:00 UZT (UTC+5)	Azmiddinov (yellow card) 40' (red card) 78'; Tursunov (yellow card) 43'; Turgunboev 45+1'; Sayfiev (yellow card) 59'; Hamraliyev (yellow card) 90+10'	Report	Ro'ziyev (yellow card) 2'; Otaxonov (penalty missed) 90+11'	Stadium: Central Stadium; Attendance: 317; Referee: Akobir Shukrullayev

29 May 2023 12	Pakhtakor Tashkent	1 – 0	Surkhon Termez	Tashkent
20:00 UZT (UTC+5)	Azmiddinov (yellow card) 70'; Ćeran 75'; Hamraliyev (yellow card) 90+3'	Report	Sherbo‘tayev (yellow card) 18'	Stadium: Central Stadium; Attendance: 808; Referee: Rahimbek Karimov

25 June 2023 13	Bunyodkor	1 – 2	Pakhtakor Tashkent	Tashkent
18:30 UZT (UTC+5)	Izzatov 11'	Report	Alijonov 72'; Kholdorkhonov 90+5'	Stadium: Milliy Stadium; Attendance: 1,021; Referee: Temur Tuhtasinov

29 June 2023 8	Pakhtakor Tashkent	1 – 1	Andijon	Tashkent
20:00 UZT (UTC+5)	Alijonov 53'	Report	Hebaj 78'	Stadium: Central Stadium; Attendance: 3,216; Referee: Vadim Agishev

28 July 2023 14	Olympic Tashkent	0 – 2	Pakhtakor Tashkent	Tashkent
20:00 UZT (UTC+5)	Mirsaidov (yellow card) 72'	Report	Kholmatov 3'; Hamraliyev (yellow card) 28' (yellow-red card) 33'; Hamrobekov (yellow card) 28'; Ćeran 54'; Kuvvatov (yellow card) 90+5'	Stadium: JAR Stadium; Attendance: 1,493; Referee: Ilgiz Tantashev

5 August 2023 15	Pakhtakor Tashkent	0 – 1	Neftchi Fergana	Tashkent
20:00 UZT (UTC+5)	Turgunboev (yellow card) 88'	Report	Nikabadze (yellow card) 53'; Turapov 69' (yellow card) 80'; Adhamzoda (yellow card) 80'; G‘ulomov (yellow card) 83'	Stadium: Central Stadium; Attendance: 10,200; Referee: Firdavs Norsafarov

10 August 2023 16	Navbahor Namangan	1 – 2	Pakhtakor Tashkent	Namangan
19:00 UZT (UTC+5)	Yakhshiboev (yellow card) 22'; Abdumannopov (yellow card) 37'; Tabatadze 68'	Report	Banaszak (yellow card) 26'; Ćeran 30' (yellow card) 41'; Hamraliyev 44'; Hamrobekov (yellow card) 75'; Kuvvatov (yellow card) 78'	Stadium: Markaziy Stadium; Attendance: 25,260; Referee: Akobir Shukrullayev

15 August 2023 11	Nasaf	0 – 0	Pakhtakor Tashkent	Qarshi
20:00 UZT (UTC+5)		Report		Stadium: Markaziy Stadium; Attendance: 15,107; Referee: Ilgiz Tantashev
Note: Match originally scheduled for 20 May 2023

19 August 2023 17	Pakhtakor Tashkent	1 – 0	Metallurg Bekabad	Tashkent
19:00 UZT (UTC+5)	Banaszak 45'; Hamraliyev (yellow card) 63'	Report		Stadium: Central Stadium; Attendance: 1,823; Referee: Sultonmurod Abdurahmonov

29 August 2023 18	Qizilqum Zarafshon	2 – 3	Pakhtakor Tashkent	Navoiy
19:30 UZT (UTC+5)	Juraev (yellow card) 24'; Kenzhaboev 42' (pen.); Shulaia (yellow card) 73' (goal) 90+6' (pen.)	Report	Kholmatov 14'; Hamrobekov 25' (yellow card) 32'; Turgunboev (yellow card) 37'; Khamdamov (yellow card) 63'; Sabirkhodjaev 78'; Xoldorxonov (yellow card) 90'; Azmiddinov (red card) 90+5'	Stadium: Yoshlar Stadium; Attendance: 3,428; Referee: Rustam Choriyev

24 September 2023 19	Sogdiana Jizzakh	1 – 1	Pakhtakor Tashkent	Jizzakh
18:00 UZT (UTC+5)	Mavlonqulov 42'; Mitrovic (yellow card) 87'	Report	Xoldorxonov 90+6' (pen.)	Stadium: Sogdiana Stadium; Attendance: 2,594; Referee: Ahrol Risqulloyev

28 September 2023 20	Pakhtakor Tashkent	2 – 2	AGMK	Tashkent
19:00 UZT (UTC+5)	Banaszak 24'; Xoldorxonov (yellow card) 35'; Turgunboev 63' (yellow card) 90+2'; Hamrobekov (yellow card) 72'	Report	Mirakhmadov 22'; Rustamov (yellow card) 27'; Akhmadaliev 38'	Stadium: Central Stadium; Attendance: 5,377; Referee: Akobir Shukrullayev

8 October 2023 21	Andijon	1 – 0	Pakhtakor Tashkent	Andijan
17:00 UZT (UTC+5)	Hebaj 84'; Bubanja (yellow card) 89'	Report	Khamdamov (yellow card) 20'; Azmiddinov (yellow card) 44'; Banaszak (yellow card) 67'	Stadium: Bobur Arena; Attendance: 10,584; Referee: Komil Rasulov

20 October 2023 22	Pakhtakor Tashkent	3 – 0	Turon	Tashkent
19:00 UZT (UTC+5)	Saitov 15'; Erkinov (yellow card) 45+3' (goal) 71'; Azmiddinov (yellow card) 70'; Hamraliyev (yellow card) 73'; Sabirkhodjaev 85'	Report		Stadium: Central Stadium; Attendance: 218; Referee: Abdurashid Xudoyberganov

29 October 2023 23	Bukhara	0 – 1	Pakhtakor Tashkent	Bukhara
17:00 UZT (UTC+5)	Qayumov (yellow card) 3'; Ortiqboyev (yellow card) 28'; Jo‘rayev (yellow card) 75'; Kukić (yellow card) 84'	Report	Sayfiev (yellow card) 40'; Turgunboev (yellow card) 75'; Ćeran (penalty missed) 90+6' 90+6'; Pavlyuchenko (yellow card) 90+10'	Stadium: Buxoro Arena; Attendance: 1,256; Referee: Ravshan Abduvohidov

3 November 2023 24	Pakhtakor Tashkent	1 – 1	Nasaf	Tashkent
18:15 UZT (UTC+5)	Erkinov 79' (yellow card) 80'	Report	Nasrullaev 27'; Mozgovoy (yellow card) 36'; Sidikov (yellow card) 57'; Gaybullaev (yellow card) 81'; Narzullaev (yellow card) 90+10'	Stadium: Central Stadium; Attendance: 12,365; Referee: Ilgiz Tantashev

24 November 2023 25	Surkhon Termez	1 – 3	Pakhtakor Tashkent	Termez
18:15 UZT (UTC+5)	Tursunov (yellow card) 13'; Nimely 72'; Sokol (yellow card) 79'	Report	Saitov 53'; Turgunboev 66'	Stadium: Alpamish Stadium; Attendance: 6,063; Referee: Shavkat Nasibullayev

1 December 2023 26	Pakhtakor Tashkent	2 – 3	Bunyodkor	Tashkent
17:15 UZT (UTC+5)	Xoldorxonov 14'; Ćeran (yellow card) 38' (goal) 47'; Abdumajidov (yellow card) 90+3'	Report	Abdurahmonov 34'; Wellington 37'; M.Mahamadjonov 59'; Tupliyev (yellow card) 68'	Stadium: Central Stadium; Attendance: 426; Referee: Aziz Asimov

=== Uzbek Cup ===
==== Group stage ====
Pos	Team	Pld	W	D	L	GF	GA	GD	Pts	Qualification
1	Aral (Q)	3	2	1	0	8	3	+5	7	Advanced to Playoff Round
2	Pakhtakor Tashkent (Q)	3	2	0	1	6	2	+4	6	Advanced to Playoff Round
3	Sogdiana Jizzakh (E)	3	1	1	1	7	3	+4	4	
4	Do'stlik Toshkent (E)	3	0	0	3	1	14	−13	0	

Updated to match(es) played on 3 June 2023. Source: PFL
(E) Eliminated; (Q) Qualified for the phase indicated

26 April 2023 1	Pakhtakor Tashkent	1 – 0	Sogdiana Jizzakh	Tashkent
18:30 UZT (UTC+5)	Khamdamov (yellow card) 43'; Hamrobekov (yellow card) 63'; Ćeran 87'	Report	Andreev (yellow card) 40'; Qakhramanov (yellow card) 76'	Stadium: Central Stadium; Attendance: 1,078; Referee: Abdurashid Xudoyberganov

24 May 2023 2	Doʻstlik Tashkent	0 – 5	Pakhtakor Tashkent	Tashkent
20:00 UZT (UTC+5)	Obidjonov (yellow card) 28'	Report	Hamrobekov (penalty missed) 6'; Sayfiev (penalty missed) 33'; Khamdamov 35', 52'; Turgunboev 37'; O'rinboyev 61' (o.g.); Todorov 75'	Stadium: Central Stadium; Attendance: 320; Referee: Doston Rahmonov

3 June 2023 3	Aral Samalı	2 – 0	Pakhtakor Tashkent	Nukus
18:00 UZT (UTC+5)	Kuanishbayev 20'; Qutibayev (yellow card) 31'; Ahmadjonov (yellow card) 49'; Yusupbayev (yellow card) 75'; Turopov (yellow card) 76'; Yusupbayev 90+3'	Report	Turgunboev (yellow card) 12'; Abdumajidov (red card) 28'; Sabirkhodjaev (yellow card) 50'	Stadium: Turon Stadium; Attendance: 2,115; Referee: Firdavs Norsafarov

==== Knockout stage ====
1 August 2023 Round of 16	Dinamo Samarqand	3 – 2	Pakhtakor Tashkent	Samarkand
20:00 UZT (UTC+5)	Narh 5' (yellow card) 37'; Mo'ydinov 13'; Suleymanov (yellow card) 23'; Kojo 27'; Ubaydullayev (yellow card) 73'; Mensah (yellow card) 78'	Report	Tursunov (yellow card) 26'; Banaszak (yellow card) 31'; Hamrobekov (yellow card) 44'; Ćeran 60', 82'; Turgunboev (yellow card) 63'	Stadium: Dinamo Samarkand Stadium; Attendance: 5,023; Referee: Komil Rasulov

=== AFC Champions League ===
==== Group stage ====
Pos	Team	Pld	W	D	L	GF	GA	GD	Pts	Qualification
1	(United Arab Emirates) Al-Ain	6	5	0	1	17	9	+8	15	Advance to round of 16
2	(Saudi Arabia) Al-Fayha	6	3	0	3	12	10	+2	9	Advance to round of 16
3	(Uzbekistan) Pakhtakor	6	2	1	3	8	11	−3	7	
4	(Turkmenistan) Ahal	6	1	1	4	6	13	−7	4	

Source: AFC
Rules for classification: Tiebreakers

19 September 2023 1	Pakhtakor Tashkent (Uzbekistan)	0 – 3	(United Arab Emirates) Al Ain	Tashkent, Uzbekistan
19:00 UZT (UTC+5)	Azmiddinov (yellow card) 62'; Alijonov (yellow card) 68'; Kholdorkhonov (yellow card) 81'; Banaszak (yellow card) 88'	Report	Laba 11', 66'; Al-Balochi 25'; Autonne (yellow card) 43'; Al-Balochi (yellow card) 62'; Al-Ahbabi (yellow card) 84'; Barman (yellow card) 90'	Stadium: Bunyodkor Stadium; Attendance: 8,117; Referee: Ko Hyung-jin (South Korea)

3 October 2023 2	Al-Fayha (Saudi Arabia)	2 – 0	(Uzbekistan) Pakhtakor Tashkent	Riyadh, Saudi Arabia
21:00 UZT (UTC+5)	Sabiri 10', 71' (yellow card) 79'; Al-Rashidi (yellow card) 18'; Al-Kassar (yellow card) 77'; R.Kaabi (yellow card) 83'	Report	Kholmatov (yellow card) 5'; Sayfiev (yellow card) 56'; Alijonov (yellow card) 68'; Hamrobekov (yellow card) 90+5'	Stadium: Prince Faisal bin Fahd Stadium; Attendance: 1,088; Referee: Mohanad Qasim Sarray (Iraq)
Note: Match played at the Prince Faisal bin Fahd Stadium in Riyadh, instead of Al-Fayha's regular Al Majma'ah Sports City stadium in Al Majma'ah.

24 October 2023 3	Pakhtakor Tashkent (Uzbekistan)	3 – 0	(Turkmenistan) Ahal	Tashkent, Uzbekistan
19:00 UZT (UTC+5)	Kholmatov (penalty missed) 23' (yellow card) 84'; Erkinov 23'; Turgunboev 27', 59'	Report	Tagaýew (yellow card) 21'; Tursunow (yellow card) 31'; Ravshanow (yellow card) 62'	Stadium: Bunyodkor Stadium; Attendance: 2,110; Referee: Jumpei Iida (Japan)

7 November 2023 4	Ahal (Turkmenistan)	1 – 1	(Uzbekistan) Pakhtakor Tashkent	Ashgabat, Turkmenistan
19:00 UZT (UTC+5)	Abdyrahmanow (yellow card) 33' (goal) 81'; Gurbanow (yellow card) 44'	Report	Azmiddinov (yellow card) 49'; Hamrobekov (red card) 64'; Erkinov 90+5'	Stadium: Ashgabat Stadium; Attendance: 17,270; Referee: Nazmi Nasaruddin (Malaysia)

28 November 2023 5	Al Ain (United Arab Emirates)	1 – 3	(Uzbekistan) Pakhtakor Tashkent	Al Ain, United Arab Emirates
21:00 UZT (UTC+5)	Khalfan 18'; Al-Shamsi (yellow card) 19'; Loulendo (yellow card) 69'	Report	Azmiddinov (yellow card) 9'; Asqarov (yellow card) 45+3'; Erkinov 55', 62'; Ćeran 78'	Stadium: Hazza bin Zayed Stadium; Referee: Adham Makhadmeh (Jordan)

5 December 2023 6	Pakhtakor Tashkent (Uzbekistan)	1 – 4	(Saudi Arabia) Al-Fayha	Tashkent, Uzbekistan
19:00 UZT (UTC+5)	Erkinov 16'; Ćeran (yellow card) 62'	Report	Sakala (yellow card) 23' (goal) 40', 90+4'; Mandash 46'; Al-Anazi (yellow card) 58'; Onyekuru 85'; R.Kaabi (yellow card) 90'	Stadium: Bunyodkor Stadium; Attendance: 2,150; Referee: Ahmed Al-Kaf (Oman)

== Squad statistics ==
As of match played 5 December 2023

=== Appearances and goals ===
No.	Pos	Nat	Player	Total		Super League		Uzbek Cup		Super Cup		AFC Champions League	
No.	Pos	Nat	Player	Apps	Goals	Apps	Goals	Apps	Goals	Apps	Goals	Apps	Goals
2	MF	(Uzbekistan) UZB	Behruzbek Asqarov	14	0	3+7	0	0	0	0	0	2+2	0
3	DF	(Uzbekistan) UZB	Khojiakbar Alijonov	30	2	24	2	1+1	0	1	0	3	0
4	DF	(Uzbekistan) UZB	Dostonbek Tursunov	16	2	12	2	2	0	0	0	2	0
5	DF	(Uzbekistan) UZB	Muhammadqodir Hamraliyev	24	1	18	1	3	0	0	0	3	0
6	MF	(Uzbekistan) UZB	Muhammadali Urinbaev	6	0	0+2	0	1	0	0	0	0+3	0
7	MF	(Uzbekistan) UZB	Odiljon Hamrobekov	10	1	2	1	3	0	1	0	4	0
8	MF	(Uzbekistan) UZB	Azizbek Turgunboev	35	8	21+3	5	3+1	1	1	0	6	2
9	MF	(Poland) POL	Michał Kucharczyk	4	0	1+1	0	1	0	0	0	0+1	0
10	FW	(Serbia) SRB	Dragan Ćeran	29	17	20+2	13	1+1	3	1	0	4	1
11	FW	(Uzbekistan) UZB	Po'latxo'ja Xoldorxonov	25	3	6+12	3	0+1	0	0	0	2+4	0
12	DF	(Uzbekistan) UZB	Sunnatilla Poyonov	2	0	0	0	1+1	0	0	0	0	0
16	FW	(Uzbekistan) UZB	Rustam Turdimurodov	2	0	0+1	0	0+1	0	0	0	0	0
17	MF	(Uzbekistan) UZB	Dostonbek Khamdamov	33	2	22+3	0	3+1	2	0+1	0	1+2	0
18	MF	(Uzbekistan) UZB	Saidumarxon Saidnurullayev	2	0	0+2	0	0	0	0	0	0	0
19	FW	(Poland) POL	Przemysław Banaszak	19	3	9+4	2	1	0	1	1	2+2	0
20	MF	(Uzbekistan) UZB	Khojimat Erkinov	15	7	3+6	2	1	0	0+1	0	4	5
24	DF	(Uzbekistan) UZB	Kirill Todorov	1	1	0	0	0+1	1	0	0	0	0
27	MF	(Uzbekistan) UZB	Sardor Sabirkhodjaev	36	2	26	2	4	0	1	0	5	0
28	MF	(Uzbekistan) UZB	Diyor Kholmatov	32	2	15+8	2	2+1	0	0	0	6	0
29	MF	(Uzbekistan) UZB	Muhriddin Pazildinov	1	0	0	0	0+1	0	0	0	0	0
30	DF	(Netherlands) NED	Matthew Steenvoorden	10	0	6	0	1	0	1	0	2	0
31	MF	(Uzbekistan) UZB	Muhammadali Usmonov	3	0	0+1	0	1+1	0	0	0	0	0
33	GK	(Uzbekistan) UZB	Eldorbek Suyunov	3	0	1	0	2	0	0	0	0	0
34	DF	(Uzbekistan) UZB	Farrukh Sayfiev	31	2	20+1	2	3	0	1	0	6	0
35	GK	(Uzbekistan) UZB	Sanjar Kuvvatov	25	0	20	0	2	0	1	0	2	0
36	GK	(Belarus) BLR	Pavel Pavlyuchenko	9	0	5	0	0	0	0	0	4	0
40	MF	(Kyrgyzstan) KGZ	Kimi Merk	8	0	1+5	0	0	0	0	0	0+2	0
52	MF	(Uzbekistan) UZB	Nurlan Ibraimov	1	0	0+1	0	0	0	0	0	0	0
55	DF	(Uzbekistan) UZB	Muhammadrasul Abdumajidov	4	0	0+1	0	2	0	0	0	1	0
77	DF	(Uzbekistan) UZB	Dilshod Saitov	29	2	5+13	2	4	0	1	0	3+3	0
88	DF	(Uzbekistan) UZB	Shahzod Azmiddinov	29	0	18+3	0	2	0	1	0	4+1	0
90	MF	(Uzbekistan) UZB	Javohir Alijonov	2	0	0	0	0+2	0	0	0	0	0
Players away on loan:
Players who left Pakhtakor Tashkent during the season:
9	FW	(Uzbekistan) UZB	Sardor Rashidov	4	0	2+2	0	0	0	0	0	0	0
14	MF	(Uzbekistan) UZB	Abbosbek Fayzullaev	6	2	6	2	0	0	0	0	0	0
15	MF	(Georgia (country)) GEO	Giorgi Papava	3	0	1+2	0	0	0	0	0	0	0

=== Goal scorers ===
Place	Position	Nation	Number	Name	Super League	Uzbekistan Cup	Super Cup	AFC Champions League	Total
1	FW	(Serbia)	10	Dragan Ćeran	13	3	0	1	17
2	MF	(Uzbekistan)	8	Azizbek Turgunboev	5	1	0	2	8
3	MF	(Uzbekistan)	20	Khojimat Erkinov	2	0	0	5	7
4	FW	(Uzbekistan)	11	Po'latxo'ja Xoldorxonov	3	0	0	0	3
4	FW	(Poland)	19	Przemysław Banaszak	2	0	1	0	3
6	DF	(Uzbekistan)	4	Dostonbek Tursunov	2	0	0	0	2
6	DF	(Uzbekistan)	34	Farrukh Sayfiev	2	0	0	0	2
6	MF	(Uzbekistan)	14	Abbosbek Fayzullaev	2	0	0	0	2
6	DF	(Uzbekistan)	3	Khojiakbar Alijonov	2	0	0	0	2
6	MF	(Uzbekistan)	28	Diyor Kholmatov	2	0	0	0	2
6	MF	(Uzbekistan)	27	Sardor Sabirkhodjaev	2	0	0	0	2
6	DF	(Uzbekistan)	77	Dilshod Saitov	2	0	0	0	2
6	MF	(Uzbekistan)	17	Dostonbek Khamdamov	0	2	0	0	2
14	DF	(Uzbekistan)	5	Muhammadqodir Hamraliyev	1	0	0	0	1
14	MF	(Uzbekistan)	7	Odiljon Hamrobekov	1	0	0	0	1
14	DF	(Uzbekistan)	24	Kirill Todorov	0	1	0	0	1
14				Own goal	0	1	0	0	1
				TOTALS	41	8	1	8	58

=== Clean sheets ===
Place	Position	Nation	Number	Name	Super League	Uzbekistan Cup	Super Cup	AFC Champions League	Total
1	GK	(Uzbekistan)	35	Sanjar Kuvvatov	6	0	0	0	6
2	GK	(Belarus)	36	Pavel Pavlyuchenko	2	0	0	1	3
3	GK	(Uzbekistan)	33	Eldorbek Suyunov	0	2	0	0	2
				TOTALS	8	2	0	1	11

=== Disciplinary record ===
Number	Nation	Position	Name	Super League		Uzbekistan Cup		Super Cup		AFC Champions League		Total	
Number	Nation	Position	Name	Booked	Sent off (straight red)	Booked	Sent off (straight red)	Booked	Sent off (straight red)	Booked	Sent off (straight red)	Booked	Sent off (straight red)
2	(Uzbekistan)	MF	Behruzbek Asqarov	0	0	0	0	0	0	1	0	1	0
3	(Uzbekistan)	DF	Khojiakbar Alijonov	0	0	0	0	1	0	2	0	3	0
4	(Uzbekistan)	DF	Dostonbek Tursunov	3	1	1	0	0	0	0	0	4	1
5	(Uzbekistan)	DF	Muhammadqodir Hamraliyev	7	1	0	0	0	0	0	0	7	1
7	(Uzbekistan)	MF	Odiljon Hamrobekov	7	0	2	0	0	0	1	1	10	1
8	(Uzbekistan)	MF	Azizbek Turgunboev	5	0	2	0	0	0	0	0	7	0
10	(Serbia)	FW	Dragan Ćeran	5	0	0	0	0	0	1	0	6	0
11	(Uzbekistan)	FW	Po'latxo'ja Xoldorxonov	2	0	0	0	0	0	1	0	3	0
17	(Uzbekistan)	MF	Dostonbek Khamdamov	2	0	1	0	0	0	0	0	3	0
19	(Poland)	FW	Przemysław Banaszak	2	0	1	0	0	0	1	0	4	0
20	(Uzbekistan)	MF	Khojimat Erkinov	2	0	0	0	0	0	0	0	2	0
27	(Uzbekistan)	MF	Sardor Sabirkhodjaev	0	0	1	0	0	0	0	0	1	0
28	(Uzbekistan)	DF	Diyor Kholmatov	0	0	0	0	0	0	2	0	2	0
33	(Uzbekistan)	GK	Eldorbek Suyunov	1	0	0	0	0	0	0	0	1	0
34	(Uzbekistan)	DF	Farrukh Sayfiev	4	0	0	0	0	0	1	0	5	0
35	(Uzbekistan)	GK	Sanjar Kuvvatov	2	0	0	0	0	0	0	0	2	0
36	(Belarus)	GK	Pavel Pavlyuchenko	1	0	0	0	0	0	0	0	1	0
55	(Uzbekistan)	DF	Muhammadrasul Abdumajidov	1	0	0	1	0	0	0	0	1	1
88	(Uzbekistan)	DF	Shahzod Azmiddinov	6	2	0	0	0	0	3	0	9	2
Players who left Pakhtakor Tashkent during the season:
14	(Uzbekistan)	MF	Abbosbek Fayzullaev	1	0	0	0	0	0	0	0	1	0
15	(Georgia (country))	MF	Giorgi Papava	1	0	0	0	0	0	0	0	1	0
			TOTALS	48	5	8	1	1	0	13	1	69	7
