= Michał Kucharczyk =

Polish footballer (born 1991)

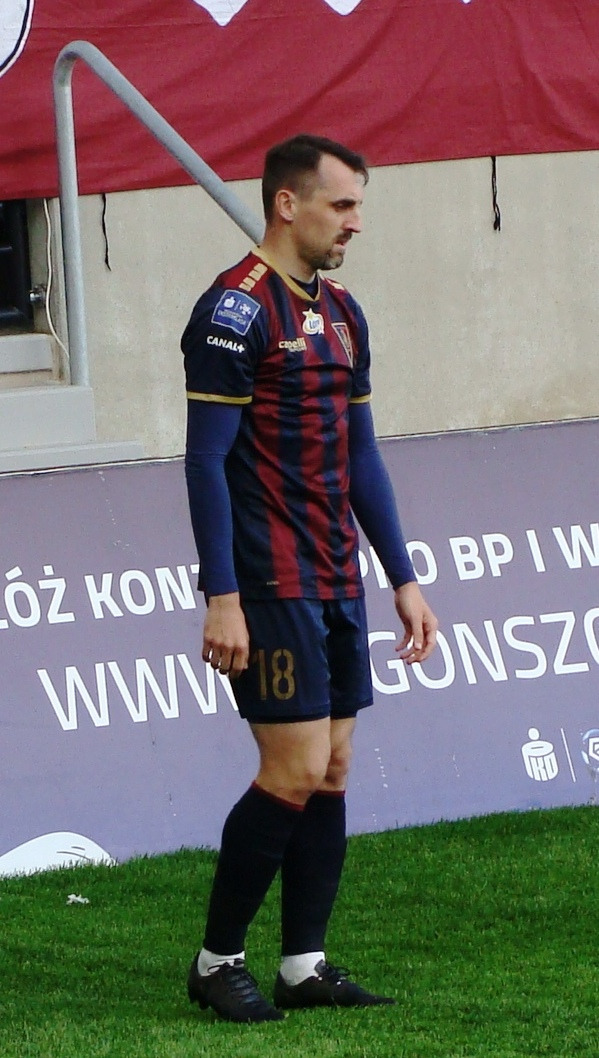
- Kucharczyk with Pogoń Szczecin in 2021

Personal information
- Full name: Michał Kucharczyk
- Date of birth: 20 March 1991 (age 35)
- Place of birth: Warsaw, Poland
- Height: 1.78 m (5 ft 10 in)
- Positions: Winger; forward

Youth career
- Świt Nowy Dwór Mazowiecki

Senior career*
Years	Team	Apps	(Gls)
2008–2009	Świt Nowy Dwór Mazowiecki	36	(27)
2009–2019	Legia Warsaw	240	(48)
2009–2010	→ Świt Nowy Dwór Mazowiecki (loan)	25	(13)
2014	Legia Warsaw II	1	(0)
2019–2020	Ural Yekaterinburg	16	(0)
2020–2023	Pogoń Szczecin	72	(11)
2022	Pogoń Szczecin II	1	(0)
2023	Pakhtakor	2	(0)
2024–2025	Legia Warsaw II	21	(7)
2025	Legia Warsaw	1	(0)
2025–2026	Świt Nowy Dwór Mazowiecki	25	(12)
2025–2026	Świt Nowy Dwór Mazowiecki II	9	(9)

International career
2009-2010	Poland U19	14	(3)
2010	Poland U20	3	(0)
2011–2012	Poland U21	7	(1)
2011–2015	Poland	9	(1)
- * Club domestic league appearances and goals as of 00:05, 31 October 2026 (UTC)

Michał Kucharczyk (born 20 March 1991) is a Polish professional footballer who plays as a winger or a striker. In 2025, he briefly joined Canal+ as a pundit, becoming a part of their Ekstraklasa coverage team.

== Club career ==
Kucharczyk was born in Warsaw. He began his career at Świt Nowy Dwór Mazowiecki and played in the III liga (fourth tier) of Polish football for two seasons. In 2009, he was signed by Legia Warsaw and immediately loaned back to Świt to play in the II liga (third tier). At the start of the 2010–11 season, he returned to Legia. He scored his first Ekstraklasa goal in a match against Lech Poznań on 24 September 2010.

On 22 July 2019, he signed with Russian Premier League club FC Ural Yekaterinburg. On 6 August 2020 Kucharczyk signed a three-year contract with Pogoń Szczecin as a free player.

On 14 July 2023, he signed with Uzbek club Pakhtakor, contracted until the end of 2024. On 24 November 2023, a game before the end of the 2023 Uzbekistan Super League, alongside compatriot Przemysław Banaszak, he secured the national championship. On 7 February 2024, he joined III liga club Legia Warsaw II, signing a contract until 30 June 2025.

On 19 July 2025, Kucharczyk returned to his first club Świt Nowy Dwór Mazowiecki. In September 2026, he was moved to the reserve team by the club's management. On 29 October, his contract was terminated by mutual consent.

== International career ==
Kucharczyk debuted for the national team of Poland on 6 February 2011 in a friendly match against Moldova.

== Career statistics ==
=== Club ===
As of match played 10 October 2026

Appearances and goals by club, season and competition
Club	Season	League			National cup (Note: Includes Polish Cup, Uzbekistan Cup)		Continental		Other		Total	
Club	Season	Division	Apps	Goals	Apps	Goals	Apps	Goals	Apps	Goals	Apps	Goals
Świt Nowy Dwór Mazowiecki	2007–08	III liga, group I	12	3	0	0	—		—		12	3
Świt Nowy Dwór Mazowiecki	2008–09	III liga, group A	24	24	0	0	—		—		24	24
Świt Nowy Dwór Mazowiecki	2009–10	II liga East	25	13	0	0	—		—		25	13
Świt Nowy Dwór Mazowiecki	Total		61	40	0	0	—		—		61	40
Legia Warsaw	2010–11	Ekstraklasa	27	5	7	3	—		—		34	8
Legia Warsaw	2011–12	Ekstraklasa	25	3	3	0	7 (Note: Appearances in UEFA Europa League)	2	—		35	5
Legia Warsaw	2012–13	Ekstraklasa	23	2	7	1	4	1	1 (Note: Appearance in Polish Super Cup)	0	35	4
Legia Warsaw	2013–14	Ekstraklasa	23	9	2	0	9 (Note: Four appearances and one goal in UEFA Champions League, five appearances in UEFA Europa League)	1	—		34	10
Legia Warsaw	2014–15	Ekstraklasa	27	6	6	1	13 (Note: Three appearances and one goal in UEFA Champions League, ten appearances and two goals in UEFA Europa League)	3	—		46	10
Legia Warsaw	2015–16	Ekstraklasa	32	6	5	0	12	3	1	0	50	9
Legia Warsaw	2016–17	Ekstraklasa	21	6	1	0	12 (Note: Ten appearances and two goals in UEFA Champions League, two appearances in UEFA Europa League)	2	1	0	35	8
Legia Warsaw	2017–18	Ekstraklasa	33	7	4	1	5 (Note: Three appearances and two goals in UEFA Champions League, two appearances in UEFA Europa League)	2	0	0	42	10
Legia Warsaw	2018–19	Ekstraklasa	28	4	4	2	5 (Note: Three appearances and one goal in UEFA Champions League, two appearances in UEFA Europa League)	1	1	0	38	7
Legia Warsaw	Total		240	48	38	8	67	15	4	0	349	71
Legia Warsaw II	2013–14	III liga, group A	1	0	—		—		—		1	0
Ural Yekaterinburg	2019–20	Russian Premier League	16	0	3	0	—		—		19	0
Pogoń Szczecin	2020–21	Ekstraklasa	30	6	3	1	—		—		33	7
Pogoń Szczecin	2021–22	Ekstraklasa	32	5	1	0	0	0	—		33	5
Pogoń Szczecin	2022–23	Ekstraklasa	10	0	2	0	1 (Note: Appearance in UEFA Europa Conference League)	0	—		13	0
Pogoń Szczecin	Total		72	11	6	1	1	0	0	0	79	12
Pogoń Szczecin II	2022–23	III liga, group II	1	0	—		—		—		1	0
Pakhtakor	2023	Uzbekistan Super League	2	0	1	0	1 (Note: Appearance in AFC Champions League)	0	0	0	4	0
Legia Warsaw II	2023–24	III liga, group I	13	6	—		—		—		13	6
Legia Warsaw II	2024–25	III liga, group I	8	1	—		—		—		8	1
Legia Warsaw II	Total		21	7	—		—		—		21	7
Legia Warsaw	2024–25	Ekstraklasa	1	0	—		—		—		1	0
Świt Nowy Dwór Mazowiecki	2025–26	III liga, group I	25	12	—		—		—		25	12
Świt Nowy Dwór Mazowiecki	2026–27	III liga, group I	0	0	—		—		—		0	0
Świt Nowy Dwór Mazowiecki	Total		25	12	—		—		—		25	12
Świt Nowy Dwór Mazowiecki II	2025–26	Regional league	1	0	—		—		—		1	0
Świt Nowy Dwór Mazowiecki II	2026–27	Regional league	8	9	—		—		—		8	9
Świt Nowy Dwór Mazowiecki II	Total		9	9	—		—		—		9	9
Career total			449	127	51	11	69	15	4	0	573	153

=== International ===
Appearances and goals by national team and year
National team	Year	Apps	Goals
Poland
Poland	2011	4	0
Poland	2012	1	0
Poland	2013	1	0
Poland	2014	2	1
Poland	2015	1	0
Total		9	1

Scores and results list Poland's goal tally first, score column indicates score after each Kucharczyk goal.

List of international goals scored by Michał Kucharczyk
No.	Date	Venue	Opponent	Score	Result	Competition
1	18 January 2014	Zayed Sports City Stadium, Abu Dhabi	Norway	2–0	3–0	Friendly

== Honours ==
Świt Nowy Dwór Mazowiecki

- III liga, group A: 2008–09

Legia Warsaw

- Ekstraklasa: 2012–13, 2013–14, 2015–16, 2016–17, 2017–18
- Polish Cup: 2010–11, 2011–12, 2012–13, 2014–15, 2015–16, 2017–18

Pakhtakor

- Uzbekistan Super League: 2023

Legia Warsaw II

- Polish Cup (Masovia regionals): 2024–25
