= Armin Bošnjak =

Montenegrin footballer

Personal information
- Full name: Armin Bošnjak
- Date of birth: 20 April 1994 (age 32)
- Place of birth: FR Yugoslavia
- Height: 1.87 m (6 ft 1 1/2 in)
- Position: Forward

Team information
- Current team: Metallurg Bekabad

Senior career*
Years	Team	Apps	(Gls)
2013–2015	Jedinstvo	10	(0)
2016–2017	Iskra	32	(3)
2017–2018	Rudar Pljevlja	48	(5)
2019–2020	Zeta	43	(4)
2020–2021	Ballkani	0	(0)
2021	Tampines Rovers	20	(1)
2022–2023	Jezero	40	(6)
2023	Jedinstvo	2	(1)
2023–2024	Andijon	21	(3)
2024–2025	Jedinstvo	35	(6)
2025–2026	Arsenal Tivat	19	(4)
2026–	Metallurg Bekabad	0	(0)
- * Club domestic league appearances and goals as of 11 March 2026

Armin Bošnjak (born 20 April 1994) is a Montenegrin professional footballer who plays as a forward for Uzbekistan Pro League club Metallurg Bekabad.

== Career statistics ==
=== Club ===
As of 16 May 2023

Club	Season	League			Cup		Other		Total	
Club	Season	Division	Apps	Goals	Apps	Goals	Apps	Goals	Apps	Goals
Jedinstvo	2013–14	Druga Liga	10	0	0	0	0	0	10	0
Jedinstvo	Total		10	0	0	0	0	0	10	0
Iskra	2016–17	1. CFL	32	3	4 (Note: Appearances in the Montenegrin Cup)	1	0	0	36	4
Iskra	Total		32	3	4	1	0	0	36	4
Rudar Pljevlja	2017–18	1. CFL	34	4	2	0	0	0	36	4
Rudar Pljevlja	2018–19	1. CFL	14	1	0	0	2 (Note: Appearances in UEFA Europa League qualifying)	0	16	1
Rudar Pljevlja	Total		48	5	2	0	2	0	52	5
Zeta	2018–19	1. CFL	15	1	0	0	0	0	15	1
Zeta	2019–20	1. CFL	28	3	2	1	2	0	32	4
Zeta	Total		43	4	2	1	2	0	47	5
Ballkani	2020–21	Superleague Kosovo	0	0	0	0	0	0	0	0
Ballkani	Total		0	0	0	0	0	0	0	0
Tampines Rovers	2021	SPL	20	1	0	0	6	0	26	1
Tampines Rovers	Total		20	1	0	0	6	0	26	1
FK Jezero	2021-22	Montenegrin First League	16	1	0	0	0	0	16	1
FK Jezero	2022-23	Montenegrin First League	32	5	0	0	0	0	32	5
FK Jezero	Total		48	6	0	0	0	0	48	6
FK Jedinstvo	2023–24	Montenegrin First League	2	1	0	0	0	0	2	1
FK Jedinstvo	Total		2	1	0	0	0	0	2	1
FK Andijon	2023	Uzbekistan Super League	2	1	0	0	0	0	2	1
FK Andijon	Total		2	1	0	0	0	0	2	1
Career total			185	18	8	2	10	0	203	20
