= Aleksey Nosko =

Belarusian footballer

Personal information
- Date of birth: 15 August 1996 (age 30)
- Place of birth: Grodno, Belarus
- Height: 1.88 m (6 ft 2 in)
- Position: Defender

Team information
- Current team: Maxline Vitebsk
- Number: 2

Youth career
- 2012–2014: Neman Grodno

Senior career*
Years	Team	Apps	(Gls)
2015–2016	Neman Grodno	10	(0)
2016	→ Smorgon (loan)	12	(1)
2017–2019	Energetik-BGU Minsk	54	(7)
2019–2020	Dinamo Brest	0	(0)
2019–2020	→ Energetik-BGU Minsk (loan)	30	(2)
2020	Energetik-BGU Minsk	5	(0)
2021–2023	BATE Borisov	18	(0)
2021	→ Torpedo-BelAZ Zhodino (loan)	12	(0)
2022	→ Maktaaral (loan)	10	(1)
2023	→ Bunyodkor (loan)	25	(2)
2024	Sogdiana Jizzakh	13	(0)
2025–	Maxline Vitebsk	22	(4)

International career
2017	Belarus U21	1	(0)
- * Club domestic league appearances and goals as of 9 December 2025

Aleksey Nosko (Belarusian: Аляксей Наско; Russian: Алексей Носко; born 15 August 1996) is a Belarusian professional football player currently playing for Maxline Vitebsk.

== Honours ==
BATE Borisov

- Belarusian Cup winner: 2020–21
- Belarusian Super Cup winner: 2022
