= Luka Kukić =

Bosnian footballer (born 1996)

Personal information
- Date of birth: 16 May 1996 (age 30)
- Place of birth: Mostar, Bosnia and Herzegovina
- Height: 1.89 m (6 ft 2 in)
- Position: Goalkeeper

Youth career
- –2011: Posušje
- 2011–2013: Imotski
- 2013–2016: RNK Split

Senior career*
Years	Team	Apps	(Gls)
2012–2013	Imotski	0	(0)
2016–2017	RNK Split	8	(0)
2016	→ Imotski (loan)	14	(0)
2017–2019	Osijek	0	(0)
2017–2019	Osijek II	17	(0)
2019–2020	Korona Kielce	0	(0)
2019–2020	Korona Kielce II	6	(0)
2020–2021	Sloboda Tuzla	5	(0)
2021–2022	Zrinjski Mostar	10	(0)
2022	→ Novi Pazar (loan)	8	(0)
2022–2023	Posušje	33	(0)
2023–2024	Bukhara	10	(0)
2024–2026	Botoșani	18	(0)
- * Club domestic league appearances and goals as of 10 May 2026

Luka Kukić (born 16 May 1996) is a Bosnian professional footballer who plays as a goalkeeper.
