= Miloš Milović =

Montenegrin footballer

Personal information
- Date of birth: 22 December 1995 (age 30)
- Place of birth: Budva, Montenegro, FR Yugoslavia
- Height: 1.89 m (6 ft 2 in)
- Position: Centre-back

Team information
- Current team: Budućnost
- Number: 15

Senior career*
Years	Team	Apps	(Gls)
2012–2014	Mogren	14	(0)
2014	Honka	7	(0)
2015–2016	Prishtina		
2016	Arsenal Tivat		
2016–2017	Prishtina		
2017	Bokelj	0	(0)
2018–2020	Kom	41	(2)
2020–2022	Voždovac	73	(5)
2023	Navbahor	22	(3)
2024	Qingdao Hainiu	11	(0)
2024–2025	Sumgayit	16	(0)
2026–	Budućnost	4	(0)

International career^{‡}
2011	Montenegro U17	2	(0)
2013–2014	Montenegro U19	4	(0)
2020–	Montenegro	4	(0)
- * Club domestic league appearances and goals as of 17 June 2026 ‡ National team caps and goals as of 11 June 2023

Miloš Milović (Serbian Cyrillic: Милош Миловић; born 22 December 1995) is a Montenegrin footballer who plays as a centre-back for Budućnost and the Montenegro national team.

== Club career ==
On 4 February 2024, Milović joined Chinese Super League club Qingdao Hainiu.

On 4 September 2024, Miloš signed a 1+1 year contract with Sumqayit, which competes in the Azerbaijan Premier League.

== International career ==
Milović made his international debut for Montenegro on 11 November 2020 in a friendly match against Kazakhstan.

== Career statistics ==
=== International ===
As of 10 June 2023

Montenegro
Year	Apps	Goals
2020	1	0
2021	0	0
2022	1	0
2023	1	0
Total	3	0
