= Saller =

Saller is a surname that may refer to the following people

- Benedikt Saller, German association football player
- Brandon Saller (born 1983), American drummer and vocalist of post-hardcore band Atreyu
- Eugenio Saller (1928–2017), Brazilian tennis player
- Richard Saller (born 1952), America academic

== See also ==
- Fischer–Saller scale, used in anthropology and medicine to determine the shades of hair color
- Sport-Saller, a German sportswear company
