= Tamirlan Dzhamalutdinov =

Russian football player

Personal information
- Full name: Tamirlan Ulubiyevich Dzhamalutdinov
- Date of birth: 28 July 1996 (age 30)
- Place of birth: Moscow, Russia
- Height: 1.76 m (5 ft 9 in)
- Position: Midfielder

Team information
- Current team: Merani Martvili
- Number: 21

Youth career
- 2013–2014: Anzhi Makhachkala

Senior career*
Years	Team	Apps	(Gls)
2014–2015	Anzhi-2 Makhachkala	18	(2)
2015–2018	Anzhi Makhachkala	0	(0)
2018–2020	METTA	58	(17)
2020–2021	Veles Moscow	11	(1)
2021–2022	Novi Pazar	7	(0)
2022–2023	Kyran	21	(9)
2023–2024	Surkhon Termez	19	(3)
2024–2025	Surkhon Termez	7	(0)
2025–	Merani Martvili	3	(0)
- * Club domestic league appearances and goals as of 12 April 2025

Tamirlan Ulubiyevich Dzhamalutdinov (Russian: Тамирлан Улубиевич Джамалутдинов; born 28 July 1996) is a Russian football player who plays as a central midfielder for Georgian club Merani Martvili.

== Club career ==
He made his professional debut in the Russian Professional Football League for Anzhi-2 Makhachkala on 12 August 2014 in a game against Alania Vladikavkaz.

He made his debut for the main Anzhi Makhachkala squad on 27 May 2016 in a Russian Premier League relegation play-offs game against Volgar Astrakhan.

== Career statistics ==
=== Club ===
As of 9 December 2017

Club	Season	League			Cup		Continental		Other		Total	
Club	Season	Division	Apps	Goals	Apps	Goals	Apps	Goals	Apps	Goals	Apps	Goals
FC Anzhi Makhachkala	2012–13	Russian Premier League	0	0	0	0	0	0	–		0	0
FC Anzhi Makhachkala	2013–14	Russian Premier League	0	0	0	0	0	0	–		0	0
FC Anzhi Makhachkala	2014–15	FNL	0	0	0	0	–		–		0	0
FC Anzhi Makhachkala	2015–16	Russian Premier League	0	0	0	0	–		1 (Note: One appearance in relegation play-offs)	0	1	0
FC Anzhi Makhachkala	2016–17	Russian Premier League	0	0	0	0	–		–		0	0
FC Anzhi Makhachkala	2017–18	Russian Premier League	0	0	1	0	–		–		1	0
FC Anzhi Makhachkala	Total		0	0	1	0	0	0	1	0	2	0
FC Anzhi-2 Makhachkala	2014–15	PFL	18	2	–		–		–		18	2
FC Anzhi-2 Makhachkala	2017–18	PFL	12	3	–		–		–		12	3
FC Anzhi-2 Makhachkala	Total		30	5	0	0	0	0	0	0	30	5
Career total			30	5	1	0	0	0	1	0	32	5
