= Reza Yazdandoost =

Iranian footballer

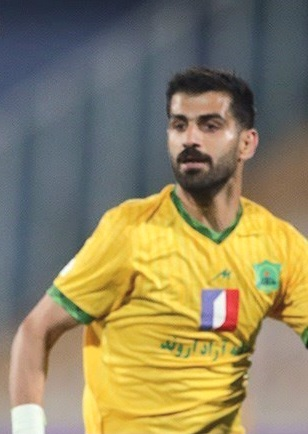

Personal information
- Full name: رضا یزدان‌دوست
- Date of birth: 7 November 1991 (age 35)
- Place of birth: Kazerun, Iran
- Height: 1.96 m (6 ft 5 in)
- Position: Right back

Team information
- Current team: Al-Yarmouk
- Number: 17

Youth career
- 2004–2014: Tractor

Senior career*
Years	Team	Apps	(Gls)
2012–2015	Sanat Naft Abadan	53	(1)
2016–2017	Naft Masjed Soleyman	30	(1)
2017–2018	Sanat Naft Abadan	2	(0)
2018–2019	Mes Rafsanjan	3	(0)
2019–2020	Esteghlal Khuzestan	5	(1)
2020–2021	Shahr Khodro	22	(1)
2021–2022	Sanat Naft Abadan	21	(0)
2022–2023	Tractor	3	(0)
2023	→ Naft Masjed Soleyman (loan)	8	(0)
2023–2024	Metallurg Bekabad	21	(1)
2024–	Al-Yarmouk	1	(1)
- * Club domestic league appearances and goals as of 14 August 2024

Reza Yazdandoost (Persian: رضا یزدان‌دوست) is an Iranian professional footballer who plays as a defender for Al-Yarmouk in the Kuwait Premier League.
