= Przemysław Banaszak =

Polish footballer (born 1997)

Personal information
- Full name: Przemysław Banaszak
- Date of birth: 10 May 1997 (age 29)
- Place of birth: Szczebrzeszyn, Poland
- Height: 1.88 m (6 ft 2 in)
- Position: Forward

Team information
- Current team: Śląsk Wrocław
- Number: 19

Youth career
- 2012–2014: Hetman Żółkiewka

Senior career*
| Years | Team | Apps | (Gls) |
| 2014–2015 | Hetman Żółkiewka | | |
| 2016–2018 | Chełmianka Chełm | | |
| 2018–2019 | Widzew Łódź | 20 | (2) |
| 2019–2020 | → Górnik Łęczna (loan) | 17 | (5) |
| 2020–2022 | Górnik Łęczna | 82 | (14) |
| 2022–2023 | Pakhtakor | 21 | (5) |
| 2024–2025 | Górnik Łęczna | 33 | (15) |
| 2025– | Śląsk Wrocław | 42 | (21) |
- * Club domestic league appearances and goals as of 23:47, 3 November 2026 (UTC)

Przemysław Banaszak (born 10 May 1997) is a Polish professional footballer who plays as a forward for Ekstraklasa club Śląsk Wrocław.

== Club career ==
On 26 July 2022, after spending three years with Górnik Łęczna, Banaszek joined Uzbek side Pakhtakor, becoming the first Polish player in the league's history. He previously played for Hetman Żółkiewka, Chełmianka Chełm and Widzew Łódź. On 24 November 2023, a game before the end of the 2023 Uzbekistan Super League, alongside compatriot Michał Kucharczyk, he secured the national championship.

Banaszak spent the first half of 2024 without a club, before returning to Górnik Łęczna on 19 June 2024. He signed a one-year contract with the Lublin side, with an extension option.

On 16 July 2025, fellow I liga club Śląsk Wrocław activated Banaszak's buyout clause and signed him on a two-year deal.

== Honours ==
Hetman Żółkiewka

- IV liga Lublin: 2013–14

Chełmianka Chełm

- IV liga Lublin: 2016–17
- Polish Cup (Lublin regionals): 2016–17
- Polish Cup (Chełm regionals): 2016–17

Górnik Łęczna

- II liga: 2019–20

Pakhtakor

- Uzbekistan Super League: 2022, 2023

Individual

- III liga, group IV top scorer: 2017–18
