= 2021 Pakhtakor Tashkent FK season =

Pakhtakor Tashkent
2021 season
- Chairman: Bobur Shodiev
- Manager: Pieter Huistra
- Uzbek League: 1st (champions)
- Uzbekistan Cup: Runners-up
- Super Cup: Winners
- AFC Champions League: Group stage
- Top goalscorer: League: Dragan Ćeran (16); All: Dragan Ćeran (19)
Home colours	Away colours

The 2021 season was Pakhtakor Tashkent's 30th season in the Uzbek League in Uzbekistan.

== Season events ==
On 11 March 2021, the AFC confirmed Sharjah in the United Arab Emirates as the host city for Pakhtakor Tashkent's group matches in this years AFC Champions League.

On 20 August, Pakhtakor Tashkent extended their contracts with Po'latkhoja Kholdorkhonov and Abbosbek Fayzullayev until the end of 2023.

== Squad ==
As of match played 4 December 2021

No.	Name	Nationality	Position	Date of birth (age)	Signed from	Signed in	Contract ends	Apps.	Goals
Goalkeepers
25	Eldorbek Suyunov	(Uzbekistan)	GK	12 April 1991 (aged 30)	Nasaf	2017		88	0
35	Sanjar Kuvvatov	(Uzbekistan)	GK	8 January 1990 (aged 31)	Nasaf	2019		62	0
44	Azizkhon Isokov	(Uzbekistan)	GK	23 December 2000 (aged 20)	Academy	2020		0	0
Defenders
3	Khojiakbar Alijonov	(Uzbekistan)	DF	19 April 1997 (aged 24)	Academy	2017		116	3
5	Anzur Ismailov	(Uzbekistan)	DF	21 April 1985 (aged 36)	Lokomotiv Tashkent	2020			
15	Egor Krimets	(Uzbekistan)	DF	27 January 1992 (aged 29)	Academy	2011	2021	215	18
23	Sherzod Azamov	(Uzbekistan)	DF	14 January 1990 (aged 31)	Nasaf	2017		125	3
29	Vladimir Kozak	(Uzbekistan)	DF	12 June 1993 (aged 28)	Youth team	2010		284	24
34	Farrukh Sayfiev	(Uzbekistan)	DF	17 January 1991 (aged 30)	Nasaf	2018		133	7
88	Shahzod Azmiddinov	(Uzbekistan)	DF	7 August 2000 (aged 21)	Academy	2020		15	2
Midfielders
7	Odiljon Hamrobekov	(Uzbekistan)	MF	13 February 1996 (aged 25)	Shabab Al Ahli	2021	2022	79	2
8	Azizbek Turgunboev	(Uzbekistan)	MF	1 October 1994 (aged 27)	Navbahor Namangan	2021		33	5
14	Khumoyunmirzo Iminov	(Uzbekistan)	MF	15 January 2000 (aged 21)	Youth Team	2019		26	0
16	Marlen Chobanov	(Uzbekistan)	MF	10 October 2000 (aged 21)	Obolon-2 Bucha	2021		13	0
17	Dostonbek Khamdamov	(Uzbekistan)	MF	24 July 1996 (aged 25)	Al-Nasr	2021	2022	90	24
18	Khojimat Erkinov	(Uzbekistan)	MF	29 May 2001 (aged 20)	Youth Team	2019		37	8
19	Sharof Mukhiddinov	(Uzbekistan)	MF	14 April 1997 (aged 24)	Nasaf	2021		28	3
21	Abror Ismoilov	(Uzbekistan)	MF	8 January 1998 (aged 23)	Surkhon	2020		61	4
27	Sardor Sabirkhodjaev	(Uzbekistan)	MF	6 November 1994 (aged 27)	Bunyodkor	2019		104	6
28	Diyor Kholmatov	(Uzbekistan)	MF	22 July 2002 (aged 19)	Youth Team	2020		31	2
42	Abbosbek Fayzullayev	(Uzbekistan)	MF	3 October 2003 (aged 18)	Youth Team	2021	2023	9	0
58	Abubakir Ashurov	(Uzbekistan)	MF	12 June 2003 (aged 18)	Youth Team	2021		1	0
Forwards
9	Sherzod Temirov	(Uzbekistan)	FW	27 October 1998 (aged 23)	Mash'al Mubarek	2021		26	8
10	Dragan Ćeran	(Serbia)	FW	6 October 1987 (aged 34)	Nasaf	2018		130	86
11	Bojan Matić	(Serbia)	FW	22 December 1991 (aged 29)	Partizan	2021	2021	16	2
63	Muhammadali O'rinboyev	(Uzbekistan)	FW	24 April 2005 (aged 16)	Youth Team	2021		2	0
99	Po'latkhoja Kholdorkhonov	(Uzbekistan)	FW	6 July 2003 (aged 18)	Academy	2021	2023	8	1
Players away on loan
	Alisher Salimov	(Uzbekistan)	DF	2 July 1999 (aged 22)	Academy	2019		9	0
	Asadbek Sobirjonov	(Uzbekistan)	MF	3 August 2000 (aged 21)	Youth Team	2019		14	1
Players who left during the season
6	Ibrokhimkhalil Yuldoshev	(Uzbekistan)	DF	14 February 2001 (aged 20)	Youth team	2019		18	2
7	Sardor Rashidov	(Uzbekistan)	FW	14 June 1991 (aged 30)	Qatar	2021		9	2
9	Eren Derdiyok	(Switzerland)	FW	12 June 1988 (aged 33)	Göztepe	2020		46	18

=== Out on loan ===
Note: Flags indicate national team as defined under FIFA eligibility rules; some limited exceptions apply. Players may hold more than one non-FIFA nationality.

No. / Pos. / Nation / Player; — / DF / UZB / Alisher Salimov (at (Uzbekistan) Surkhon)	No. / Pos. / Nation / Player; — / MF / UZB / Asadbek Sobirjonov (at (Uzbekistan) Kokand 1912)

== Transfers ==
=== Winter ===
In: Note: Flags indicate national team as defined under FIFA eligibility rules; some limited exceptions apply. Players may hold more than one non-FIFA nationality.

No.	Pos.	Nation	Player
6	DF	UZB	Ibrokhimkhalil Yuldoshev (loan return from (Uzbekistan) Bunyodkor)
7	FW	UZB	Sardor Rashidov (from Qatar)
8	MF	UZB	Azizbek Turgunboev (from (Uzbekistan) Navbahor Namangan)
16	MF	UZB	Marlen Chobanov (from (Ukraine) Obolon-2 Bucha)
17	FW	UZB	Sherzod Temirov (from (Uzbekistan) Mash'al Mubarek)
19	MF	UZB	Sharof Mukhiddinov (from (Uzbekistan) Nasaf)

Out: Note: Flags indicate national team as defined under FIFA eligibility rules; some limited exceptions apply. Players may hold more than one non-FIFA nationality.

No.	Pos.	Nation	Player
4	DF	UZB	Akramjon Komilov (to (Uzbekistan) AGMK)
6	DF	UZB	Alisher Salimov (on loan to (Uzbekistan) Surkhon)
7	MF	UZB	Sadriddin Abdullaev (to (Uzbekistan) Lokomotiv Tashkent)
8	MF	UZB	Asadbek Sobirjonov (on loan to (Uzbekistan) Kokand 1912)
9	MF	UZB	Jaloliddin Masharipov (to (Saudi Arabia) Al Nassr)
11	FW	UZB	Igor Sergeev (to (Kazakhstan) Aktobe)
17	MF	UZB	Dostonbek Khamdamov (to (United Arab Emirates) Al-Nasr)
20	MF	UZB	Odiljon Hamrobekov (to (United Arab Emirates) Shabab Al Ahli)
29	MF	UZB	Vladimir Kozak (loan to (Uzbekistan) AGMK)
76	FW	UZB	Ulugbek Khoshimov (to (Uzbekistan) Neftchi Fergana)
99	MF	UZB	Javokhir Sidikov (on loan return to (Uzbekistan) Kokand 1912)
—	DF	UZB	Umar Eshmurodov (to (Uzbekistan) Nasaf, previously on loan to (Uzbekistan) Nasaf)
—	DF	UZB	Khusniddin Gofurov (to (Uzbekistan) Surkhon, previously on loan to (Uzbekistan) Surkhon)
—	MF	UZB	Jakhongir Akhmadov (to (Uzbekistan) Surkhon, previously on loan to (Uzbekistan) Dinamo Samarqand)
—	MF	UZB	Husniddin Gafurov (to (Uzbekistan) AGMK, previously on loan to (Uzbekistan) Surkhon)
—	MF	UZB	Doston Ibragimov (to (Uzbekistan) G'ijduvon, previously on loan to (Uzbekistan) Qizilqum Zarafshon)
—	MF	UZB	Jasurbek Yakhshiboev (to (Poland) Legia Warsaw, previously on loan to (Belarus) Shakhtyor Soligorsk)
—	FW	UZB	Shokhrukh Makhmudkhozhiev (to (Uzbekistan) Navbahor Namangan, previously on loan)
—	FW	UZB	Sukhrob Nurullaev (to (Uzbekistan) Nasaf, previously on loan to (Uzbekistan) Kokand 1912)

=== Summer ===
In: Note: Flags indicate national team as defined under FIFA eligibility rules; some limited exceptions apply. Players may hold more than one non-FIFA nationality.

No.	Pos.	Nation	Player
7	MF	UZB	Odiljon Hamrobekov (from (United Arab Emirates) Shabab Al Ahli)
11	FW	SRB	Bojan Matić (from (Serbia) Partizan)
17	MF	UZB	Dostonbek Khamdamov (from (United Arab Emirates) Al-Nasr)
29	MF	UZB	Vladimir Kozak (loan return from (Uzbekistan) AGMK)

Out: Note: Flags indicate national team as defined under FIFA eligibility rules; some limited exceptions apply. Players may hold more than one non-FIFA nationality.

No.	Pos.	Nation	Player
6	DF	UZB	Ibrokhimkhalil Yuldoshev (to (Russia) Nizhny Novgorod)
7	FW	UZB	Sardor Rashidov (to Kuwait)
9	FW	SUI	Eren Derdiyok (to (Turkey) MKE Ankaragücü)

== Friendlies ==
24 January 2021	Pakhtakor Tashkent (Uzbekistan)	0 – 3	(Russia) Zenit St.Petersburg	Dubai, United Arab Emirates
12:00 UZT (UTC+5)		Report	Mostovoy 2', 57' (pen.); Krapukhin 17'; Sazonov (yellow card) 73'	Stadium: Nad Al Sheba Stadium

30 January 2021	Pakhtakor Tashkent (Uzbekistan)	1 – 2	(Russia) Spartak Moscow	Dubai, United Arab Emirates
17:00 UZT (UTC+5)	Ćeran 7' (pen.)	Report	Král 30'; Zobnin 87'	Stadium: Jebel Ali Stadium

1 March 2021	Pakhtakor Tashkent (Uzbekistan)	0 – 2	(Latvia) Riga	Dubai, United Arab Emirates
17:00 UZT (UTC+5)		Report	Mbombo 69' (pen.); Filippov 75'	Stadium: Jebel Ali Stadium

	Pakhtakor Tashkent	0 – 0	Qizilqum Zarafshon	Tashkent
UZT (UTC+5)		Report		Stadium: Central Stadium

== Competitions ==
=== Super Cup ===
6 March 2021	Pakhtakor Tashkent	1 – 0	Nasaf	Samarkand
16:00 UZT (UTC+5)	Ćeran 50'	Report	S.Nurullaev (yellow card) 12'; Aliqulov (yellow card) 71'	Stadium: Dinamo Stadium; Attendance: 5,165; Referee: Vadim Agishev

=== Uzbek League ===
==== League table ====
Pos	Team	Pld	W	D	L	GF	GA	GD	Pts	Qualification or relegation
1	Pakhtakor (C)	26	19	3	4	51	18	+33	60	Qualification to the AFC Champions League group stage
2	Sogdiana	26	12	11	3	28	15	+13	47 (Note: Sogdiana second on head-to-head points : Sogdiana 4; AGMK 1)	Qualification to the 2022 AFC Cup group stage (Note: Sogdiana are the standby team for the AFC Cup, should Nasaf advance to the AFC Champions League group stage. As Nasaf managed to qualify for the AFC Champions League group stage, Sogdiana's qualification in the AFC Cup was granted.)
3	AGMK	26	13	8	5	34	25	+9	47	
4	Nasaf	26	13	6	7	42	24	+18	45	Qualification to the AFC Champions League preliminary round (Note: Nasaf qualified to the AFC Champions League as 2021 Uzbekistan Cup champions.)
5	Bunyodkor	26	13	6	7	43	30	+13	45	

Source: Uzbekistan Professional Football League
Rules for classification: 1) points; 2) head-to-head points; 3) head-to-head goal difference; 4) head-to-head away goals scored; 5) goal difference; 6) number of goals scored.
(C) Champions

==== Results summary ====
Overall								Home						Away					
Pld	W	D	L	GF	GA	GD	Pts	W	D	L	GF	GA	GD	W	D	L	GF	GA	GD
26	19	3	4	51	18	+33	60	11	2	0	26	5	+21	8	1	4	25	13	+12

Last updated: 27 November 2021.
Source: See Results

==== Results by round ====
Round	1	2	3	4	5	6	7	8	9	10	11	12	13	14	15	16	17	18	19	20	21	22	23	24	25	26
Ground	A	H	A	H	A	A	H	A	H	H	A	H	H	H	A	H	A	H	A	H	A	H	A	H	A	A
Result	W	W	W	W	W	D	W	W	D	W	W	W	W	W	W	W	W	D	L	W	L	W	L	W	W	L
Position	1	1	1	1	1	1	1	1	1	1	1	1	1	1	1	1	1	1	1	1	1	1	1	1	1	1

Source: See Results
A = Away; H = Home; W = Win; D = Draw; L = Loss

==== Results ====
10 March 2021 1	Nasaf	2 – 3	Pakhtakor Tashkent	Qarshi
18:30 UZT (UTC+5)	S.Kamilov 35' (yellow card) 74'; S.Yuldoshev 61'; J.Mannonov (yellow card) 83'	Report	Ismoilov (yellow card) 22'; Ćeran (yellow card) 40'; Krimets (yellow card) 48'; Rashidov 72' (pen.); Mozgovoy 80' (o.g.); Yuldoshev 87'	Stadium: Markaziy Stadium; Attendance: 11,812; Referee: Ilgiz Tantashev

15 March 2021 2	Pakhtakor Tashkent	3 – 0	Mash'al Mubarek	Tashkent
18:30 UZT (UTC+5)	Sayfiev 9'; Ćeran 36'; Rashidov 59'	Report	S.Abduraimov (yellow card) 45'	Stadium: Central Stadium; Attendance: 1,679; Referee: Akobir Shukrullaev

18 March 2021 3	AGMK	0 – 3	Pakhtakor Tashkent	Olmaliq
18:30 UZT (UTC+5)		Report	Turgunboev 27'; Derdiyok 33'; Erkinov (yellow card) 86'; Yuldoshev 90+1'	Stadium: AGMK Stadium; Attendance: 3,012; Referee: Vadim Agishev

2 April 2021 4	Pakhtakor Tashkent	2 – 1	Metallurg Bekabad	Tashkent
18:30 UZT (UTC+5)	Derdiyok 23'; Mukhiddinov 36'; Krimets (red card) 69'; Kuvvatov (yellow card) 90'; Ćeran (yellow card) 90+4'	Report	Lobanov (yellow card) 25'; Tajiev (yellow card) 27'; Z.Abdullaev (yellow card) 30' (goal) 45+3'; S.Quttiboev (yellow card) 54'	Stadium: Central Stadium; Attendance: 413; Referee: Rustam Lutfullin

7 April 2021 5	Navbahor Namangan	1 – 2	Pakhtakor Tashkent	Namangan
18:30 UZT (UTC+5)	I.Isakzhanov (yellow card) 22' (goal) 71'; D.Xoshimov (yellow card) 74'; Golban (yellow card) 81'	Report	Azamov (yellow card) 45+3'; Ćeran 40', 90' (pen.) (yellow card) 82'; Ismoilov (yellow card) 69'; Kuvvatov (yellow card) 90+6'	Stadium: Markaziy Stadium; Attendance: 15,992; Referee: Firdavs Norsafarov

6 May 2021 7	Turon Yaypan	1 – 1	Pakhtakor Tashkent	Yaypan
17:00 UZT (UTC+5)	Hojiakbarov (yellow card) 35'; Sokhibov 49' (yellow card) 90+3'; J.Xakimov (yellow card) 53'; D.Umirov (yellow card) 54'	Report	Ćeran 37' (pen.); Yuldoshev (yellow card) 40'; Ismailov (yellow card) 65'	Stadium: Uzbekistan Stadium; Attendance: 5,600; Referee: Asker Najafaliyev

12 May 2021 8	Pakhtakor Tashkent	3 – 0	Kokand 1912	Tashkent
18:50 UZT (UTC+5)	D.Kholmatov 39'; Derdiyok 45+1'; Yuldoshev (yellow card) 50'; Ćeran 62' (pen.)	Report	O.Rustamov (yellow card) 65'	Stadium: Central Stadium; Attendance: 1,257; Referee: Rustam Lutfullin

19 May 2021 9	Qizilqum Zarafshon	0 – 1	Pakhtakor Tashkent	Navoiy
19:45 UZT (UTC+5)	I.To‘xtaxo‘jaev (yellow card) 68'; S.Jo‘raev (yellow card) 89'; Boydullayev (yellow card) 90+4'	Report	Ćeran 61' (yellow card) 85'; Iminov (yellow card) 79'; Erkinov (yellow card) 88'; Kuvvatov (yellow card) 90+2'	Stadium: Yoshlar Stadium; Attendance: 7,832; Referee: Akobir Shukrullaev

19 June 2021 10	Pakhtakor Tashkent	0 – 0	Sogdiana Jizzakh	Tashkent
20:00 UZT (UTC+5)	Temirov (yellow card) 25'; Sayfiev (yellow card) 27'; Ismoilov (yellow card) 45'; Alijonov (yellow card) 52'	Report	J.Qahramonov (yellow card) 16'; E.Orifov (yellow card) 17'; I.Shoyqulov (yellow card) 45+2'; D.Nasriddinov (yellow card) 52'; M.Mitrović (yellow card) 90+3'	Stadium: Central Stadium; Attendance: 10,560; Referee: Axrol Riskulloev

23 June 2021 6	Pakhtakor Tashkent	1 – 0	Andijon	Tashkent
20:00 UZT (UTC+5)	Krimets (yellow card) 4'; Temirov 14'; Ismailov (yellow card) 37'; Sabirkhodjaev (yellow card) 77'	Report		Stadium: Central Stadium; Attendance: 2,114; Referee: Abdurashid Khudoyberganov

27 June 2021 11	Surkhon Termez	0 – 4	Pakhtakor Tashkent	Termez
20:00 UZT (UTC+5)	I.Toshpulatov (yellow card) 60'	Report	Turgunboev 2', 57'; Temirov 22', 58'	Stadium: Alpamish Stadium; Attendance: 1,753; Referee: Rahimbek Karimov

4 July 2021 12	Pakhtakor Tashkent	2 – 1	Lokomotiv Tashkent	Tashkent
20:00 UZT (UTC+5)	Alijonov (yellow card) 8'; Azamov (yellow card) 11'; Ćeran 45+3'; Temirov 70' (yellow card) 80'	Report	Makharadze (yellow card) 45'; A.Amonov 90+2'	Stadium: Central Stadium; Attendance: 2,300; Referee: Vadim Agishev

31 July 2021 13	Pakhtakor Tashkent	1 – 0	Bunyodkor	Tashkent
20:00 UZT (UTC+5)	Sabirkhodjaev (yellow card) 17'; Turgunboev (yellow card) 30'; Ćeran 45+2' (pen.); Hamrobekov (yellow card) 50'	Report	Ergashev (yellow card) 45'	Stadium: Pakhtakor Central Stadium; Referee: Asker Najafaliev

6 August 2021 14	Pakhtakor Tashkent	1 – 0	Nasaf	Tashkent
20:00 UZT (UTC+5)	Matić 20'	Report	X.Aliqulov (yellow card) 51'; G.Gaybullaev (yellow card) 76'	Stadium: Pakhtakor Central Stadium; Referee: Rahimbek Karimov

13 August 2021 15	Mash'al Mubarek	0 – 1	Pakhtakor Tashkent	Muborak
20:00 UZT (UTC+5)	S.Qoziev (yellow card) 13'; Z.Akramov (yellow card) 26'; O.Nurmatov (yellow card) 47'; S.Allayev (yellow card) 74'; S.Ononiwu (penalty missed) 86'; M.Yuldoshev (yellow card) 90+2'	Report	Ćeran 33'; Hamrobekov (yellow card) 41'; Matić (yellow card) 57'	Stadium: Bahrom Vafoev Stadium; Referee: Ilgiz Tantashev

26 August 2021 16	Pakhtakor Tashkent	1 – 0	AGMK	Tashkent
19:00 UZT (UTC+5)	Turgunboev 5'; Ćeran (yellow card) 45+2'; Suyunov (yellow card) 90+4'; Sayfiev (yellow card) 90+5'	Report	Otakhonov (red card) 82'	Stadium: Pakhtakor Central Stadium; Referee: Akobir Shukrullaev

10 September 2021 17	Metallurg Bekabad	0 – 3	Pakhtakor Tashkent	Bekabad
19:00 UZT (UTC+5)	Z.Abdullaev (yellow card) 47'; K.Sattorov (yellow card) 86'	Report	Ćeran 29'; Turgunboev 31'; Suyunov (yellow card) 47'; Matić 71'; Azamov (yellow card) 85'	Stadium: Metallurg Bekabad Stadium; Referee: Viktor Serazitdinov

15 September 2021 18	Pakhtakor Tashkent	0 – 0	Navbahor Namangan	Tashkent
19:00 UZT (UTC+5)	Sayfiev (yellow card) 49'	Report	S.Telyakov (yellow card) 40'; Urinboev (yellow card) 56'	Stadium: Pakhtakor Central Stadium; Referee: Zokir Qodirov

19 September 2021 19	Andijon	1 – 0	Pakhtakor Tashkent	Andijan
16:00 UZT (UTC+5)	F.Sohibjonov 25' (yellow card) 74'; B.Qosimov (yellow card) 51'	Report	Alijonov (yellow card) 87'	Stadium: Soghlom Avlod Stadium; Attendance: 123; Referee: Shavkat Nasibullayev

25 September 2021 20	Pakhtakor Tashkent	3 – 1	Turon Yaypan	Tashkent
18:30 UZT (UTC+5)	Ćeran 26' (yellow card) 65'; Temirov 62' (yellow card) 63'; Turgunboev (yellow card) 73'; Ismailov (yellow card) 74'; Erkinov 90+2'	Report	A.Toshtemirov (yellow card) 3'; Kasmynin 49'; S.Ermatov (yellow card) 84' (yellow-red card) FT	Stadium: Pakhtakor Central Stadium; Attendance: 2,203; Referee: Akobir Shukrullaev

1 October 2021 21	Kokand 1912	4 – 2	Pakhtakor Tashkent	Kokand
16:00 UZT (UTC+5)	O.Rustamov 9'; M.Hasanov 40' (yellow card) 44'; A.Mamatxo‘jaev (yellow card) 45'; Bamba 71'; Azimov 76'; I.Vahobov (yellow card) 90+2'	Report	Azamov (yellow card) 15'; S.Azmiddinov 47'; Erkinov 71'; Turgunboev (yellow card) 75'	Stadium: Kokand Markaziy Stadium; Attendance: 6,947; Referee: Vadim Agishev

16 October 2021 22	Pakhtakor Tashkent	4 – 2	Qizilqum Zarafshon	Tashkent
16:15 UZT (UTC+5)	S.Mustafoev 3' (o.g.); Ćeran 38' (pen.), 60' (pen.), 66' (yellow card) 43'; Ismoilov (yellow card) 55'; Matić (yellow card) 90'	Report	Grigalashvili 13'; Boydullayev (yellow card) 36' (goal) 45+1'; M.Ubaydullaev (yellow card) 46'; O.Tolmasov (yellow card) 65'; I.To‘xtaxo‘jaev (yellow card) 79'	Stadium: Pakhtakor Central Stadium; Attendance: 588; Referee: Firdavs Norsafarov

24 October 2021 23	Sogdiana Jizzakh	1 – 0	Pakhtakor Tashkent	Jizzakh
16:00 UZT (UTC+5)	A.Numonov (yellow card) 9'; Norkhonov (yellow card) 11'; S.Jo‘rabekov 53'	Report	Ismoilov (yellow card) 38'; S.Azmiddinov (yellow card) 45+1'; Suyunov (yellow card) 51'; M.Chobanov (yellow card) 52' (yellow-red card) 52'; P.Kholdorkhonov (yellow card) 90+3'	Stadium: Sogdiana Stadium; Attendance: 4,503; Referee: Vadim Agishev

6 November 2021 24	Pakhtakor Tashkent	5 – 0	Surkhon Termez	Tashkent
17:00 UZT (UTC+5)	Ćeran 36' (pen.), 82' (pen.); Ismoilov (yellow card) 39'; Temirov 62', 68'; Azamov (yellow card) 65'; S.Azmiddinov 78'	Report	M.Bobojonov (yellow card) 26'; Sokhibov (yellow card) 35'; I.Yo‘ldoshev (yellow card) 81'	Stadium: Pakhtakor Central Stadium; Attendance: 8,379; Referee: Axrol Riskulloev

20 November 2021 25	Lokomotiv Tashkent	0 – 3	Pakhtakor Tashkent	Tashkent
16:15 UZT (UTC+5)	Kobilov (yellow card) 22'; Makharadze (yellow card) 60'; G.Gulomov (yellow card) 68'; Jaloliddinov (yellow card) 70'	Report	Erkinov 36', 84', 86'; Sayfiev (yellow card) 50'; Ismoilov (yellow card) 55'; S.Azmiddinov (yellow card) 60'	Stadium: Lokomotiv Stadium; Attendance: 911; Referee: Doston Mirzaraimov

27 November 2021 26	Bunyodkor	3 – 2	Pakhtakor Tashkent	Tashkent
15:00 UZT (UTC+5)	Giyosov 1' (yellow card) 81'; M.Mirakhmadov 77', 85'; Turaev (yellow card) 79'	Report	Temirov 26'; Mukhiddinov 38'	Stadium: Milliy Stadium; Attendance: 1,234; Referee: Sultonmurod Abdurahmonov

=== Uzbek Cup ===
19 August 2021 Last 16	Pakhtakor Tashkent	1 – 0	Turon Yaypan	Tashkent
19:00 UZT (UTC+5)	Sayfiev (yellow card) 82'; Erkinov 90+2'; Ismoilov (yellow card) 90+4'	Report	Kasmynin (yellow card) 4'; Chakalov (yellow card) 45'; Musaev (yellow card) 67'	Stadium: Central Stadium; Referee: Shavkat Nasibullaev

20 October 2021 Quarterfinal	Olympic	0 – 1	Pakhtakor Tashkent	Tashkent
15:30 UZT (UTC+5)	O.Jurakuziev (yellow card) 21'; A.Boriyev (yellow card) 28'	Report	Ismoilov (yellow card) 21' (goal) 64'; Sayfiev (yellow card) 89'	Stadium: JAR Stadium; Attendance: 1,266; Referee: Abdurashid Khudoyberganov

24 November 2021 Semifinal	Pakhtakor Tashkent	1 – 1 (a.e.t.) (5 – 4 p)	Bunyodkor	Tashkent
17:30 UZT (UTC+5)	Ćeran (red card) 21'; Hamrobekov (yellow card) 21'; Erkinov 41'; Ismoilov (yellow card) 77'; Ismailov (yellow card) 90+1'; S.Azmiddinov (yellow card) 92'; Azamov (red card) 120+2'	Report	Giyosov 29'; I.Tomiwa (yellow card) 64'; Ergashev (yellow card) 68'	Stadium: Pakhtakor Central Stadium; Attendance: 3,990; Referee: Akobir Shukrullaev
	Penalties
	S.Azmiddinov (penalty scored); Matić (penalty scored); Turgunboev (penalty scored); Sayfiev (penalty scored); Khamdamov (penalty scored)		Erkinov (penalty missed); A.Abdullayev (penalty scored); Giyosov (penalty scored); Ergashev (penalty scored); N.Tukhtasinov (penalty scored)

==== Final ====
4 December 2021	Pakhtakor Tashkent	1 – 2	Nasaf	Samarkand
16:00 UZT (UTC+5)	S.Azmiddinov (yellow card) 24'; Hamrobekov 28' (yellow card) 45'; M.Chobanov (yellow card) 83'	Report	Bozorov (red card) 34'; B.Abdurakhimov 38'; S.Akromov (yellow card) 61'; G.Gaybullaev 75'; U.Ergashev (yellow card) 90'	Stadium: Dinamo Stadium; Referee: Axrol Riskulloev

=== AFC Champions League ===
==== Group stages ====
Pos	Team	Pld	W	D	L	GF	GA	GD	Pts	Qualification
1	(United Arab Emirates) Sharjah (H)	6	3	2	1	9	6	+3	11	Advance to Round of 16
2	(Iran) Tractor	6	2	4	0	6	3	+3	10	Advance to Round of 16
3	(Uzbekistan) Pakhtakor	6	1	4	1	6	8	−2	7	
4	(Iraq) Al-Quwa Al-Jawiya	6	0	2	4	2	6	−4	2	

Source: AFC
(H) Hosts

14 April 2021 1	Pakhtakor Tashkent (Uzbekistan)	3 – 3	(Iran) Tractor	Sharjah, United Arab Emirates
20:00 UZT (UTC+5)	Ćeran 69'; Mukhiddinov 75'; Erkinov 82'; Krimets (yellow card) 84'	Report	Khanzadeh (yellow card) 23'; Dejagah 53' (yellow card) 79'; Abbaszadeh 56', 85' (pen.); Teymouri (yellow card) 82'; Ghaderi (yellow card) 90+4'	Stadium: Sharjah Stadium; Referee: Jumpei Iida (Japan)

17 April 2021 2	Al-Quwa Al-Jawiya (Iraq)	0 – 0	(Uzbekistan) Pakhtakor Tashkent	Sharjah, United Arab Emirates
20:00 UZT (UTC+5)	M.Jabbar (yellow card) 82'	Report	Rashidov (yellow card) 40'; Ismoilov (yellow card) 45'	Stadium: Sharjah Stadium; Referee: Hussein Abo Yehia (Lebanon)

20 April 2021 3	Sharjah (United Arab Emirates)	4 – 1	(Uzbekistan) Pakhtakor Tashkent	Sharjah, United Arab Emirates
23:00 UZT (UTC+5)	Ba Wazir 10'; S.Saleh 26'; Shukurov (yellow card) 33'; Caio 58'; Luanzinho 62'	Report	Ćeran 21'; Krimets (yellow card) 67'	Stadium: Sharjah Stadium; Referee: Jumpei Iida (Japan)

23 April 2021 4	Pakhtakor Tashkent (Uzbekistan)	1 – 1	(United Arab Emirates) Sharjah	Sharjah, United Arab Emirates
23:00 UZT (UTC+5)	Mukhiddinov (yellow card) 10'; Derdiyok 59'; Sabirkhodjaev (yellow card) 68'; Sayfiev (yellow card) 80'	Report	Al-Dhanhani (yellow card) 64'; Khalfan 87'	Stadium: Sharjah Stadium; Referee: Fu Ming (China)

26 April 2021 5	Tractor (Iran)	0 – 0	(Uzbekistan) Pakhtakor Tashkent	Sharjah, United Arab Emirates
20:00 UZT (UTC+5)	Dejagah (yellow card) 18'	Report		Stadium: Sharjah Stadium; Referee: Hussein Abo Yehia (Lebanon)

29 April 2021 6	Pakhtakor Tashkent (Uzbekistan)	1 – 0	(Iraq) Al-Quwa Al-Jawiya	Sharjah, United Arab Emirates
20:00 UZT (UTC+5)	Ismoilov (yellow card) 43'; Yuldoshev (yellow card) 53'; Kholdorkhonov 79'; Iminov (yellow card) 80'; Kuvvatov (yellow card) 87'	Report	A.Kazem (yellow card) 56'; Saeed (yellow card) 78'; H.Jabbar (yellow card) 89'; Ali Abboud (yellow card) 90+1'	Stadium: Sharjah Stadium; Referee: Nawaf Shukralla (Bahrain)

== Squad statistics ==
As of match played 4 December 2021

=== Appearances and goals ===
No.	Pos	Nat	Player	Total		Super League		Uzbek Cup		Super Cup		AFC Champions League	
No.	Pos	Nat	Player	Apps	Goals	Apps	Goals	Apps	Goals	Apps	Goals	Apps	Goals
3	DF	(Uzbekistan) UZB	Khojiakbar Alijonov	29	0	18+2	0	3	0	1	0	4+1	0
5	DF	(Uzbekistan) UZB	Anzur Ismailov	32	0	21+2	0	3	0	1	0	4+1	0
7	MF	(Uzbekistan) UZB	Odiljon Hamrobekov	14	1	10+1	0	3	1	0	0	0	0
8	MF	(Uzbekistan) UZB	Azizbek Turgunboev	33	5	20+5	5	1+3	0	1	0	2+1	0
9	MF	(Uzbekistan) UZB	Sherzod Temirov	26	8	10+8	8	2+2	0	0+1	0	1+2	0
10	FW	(Serbia) SRB	Dragan Ćeran	33	19	23	16	3	0	1	1	6	2
11	FW	(Serbia) SRB	Bojan Matić	16	2	8+4	2	2+2	0	0	0	0	0
14	MF	(Uzbekistan) UZB	Khumoyunmirzo Iminov	18	0	5+9	0	0+1	0	0	0	1+2	0
15	DF	(Uzbekistan) UZB	Egor Krimets	10	0	4+1	0	0	0	1	0	4	0
16	MF	(Uzbekistan) UZB	Marlen Chobanov	13	0	5+5	0	1+1	0	0	0	1	0
17	MF	(Uzbekistan) UZB	Dostonbek Khamdamov	16	0	5+7	0	4	0	0	0	0	0
18	MF	(Uzbekistan) UZB	Khojimat Erkinov	29	8	5+13	5	2+2	2	0+1	0	4+2	1
19	MF	(Uzbekistan) UZB	Sharof Mukhiddinov	28	3	8+12	2	1+1	0	0+1	0	3+2	1
21	MF	(Uzbekistan) UZB	Abror Ismoilov	31	1	11+10	0	1+2	1	1	0	4+2	0
23	DF	(Uzbekistan) UZB	Sherzod Azamov	29	0	21	0	3	0	0	0	3+2	0
25	GK	(Uzbekistan) UZB	Eldorbek Suyunov	12	0	11	0	1	0	0	0	0	0
27	MF	(Uzbekistan) UZB	Sardor Sabirkhodjaev	34	0	23+1	0	4	0	1	0	5	0
28	MF	(Uzbekistan) UZB	Diyor Kholmatov	28	1	17+2	1	1+2	0	0	0	2+4	0
29	MF	(Uzbekistan) UZB	Vladimir Kozak	2	0	0+1	0	0+1	0	0	0	0	0
34	DF	(Uzbekistan) UZB	Farrukh Sayfiev	35	1	25	1	4	0	1	0	5	0
35	GK	(Uzbekistan) UZB	Sanjar Kuvvatov	25	0	15	0	3	0	1	0	6	0
42	MF	(Uzbekistan) UZB	Abbosbek Fayzullayev	9	0	1+5	0	1	0	0	0	1+1	0
58	MF	(Uzbekistan) UZB	Abubakir Ashurov	1	0	0+1	0	0	0	0	0	0	0
63	FW	(Uzbekistan) UZB	Muhammadali O'rinboyev	2	0	0+2	0	0	0	0	0	0	0
88	DF	(Uzbekistan) UZB	Shahzod Azmiddinov	14	2	3+7	2	2+1	0	0	0	0+1	0
99	FW	(Uzbekistan) UZB	Po'latkhoja Kholdorkhonov	8	1	0+7	0	0	0	0	0	0+1	1
Players away on loan:
Players who left Pakhtakor Tashkent during the season:
6	DF	(Uzbekistan) UZB	Ibrokhimkhalil Yuldoshev	17	2	5+7	2	0	0	0	0	3+2	0
7	FW	(Uzbekistan) UZB	Sardor Rashidov	9	2	5	2	0	0	1	0	3	0
9	FW	(Switzerland) SUI	Eren Derdiyok	13	4	7	3	0	0	1	0	4+1	1

=== Goal scorers ===
Place	Position	Nation	Number	Name	Super League	Uzbekistan Cup	Super Cup	AFC Champions League	Total
1	FW	(Serbia)	10	Dragan Ćeran	16	0	1	2	19
2	MF	(Uzbekistan)	9	Sherzod Temirov	8	0	0	0	8
2	MF	(Uzbekistan)	18	Khojimat Erkinov	5	2	0	1	8
4	MF	(Uzbekistan)	8	Azizbek Turgunboev	5	0	0	0	5
5	FW	(Switzerland)	9	Eren Derdiyok	3	0	0	1	4
6	MF	(Uzbekistan)	19	Sharof Mukhiddinov	2	0	0	1	3
7	FW	(Uzbekistan)	7	Sardor Rashidov	2	0	0	0	2
7	DF	(Uzbekistan)	6	Ibrokhimkhalil Yuldoshev	2	0	0	0	2
7	FW	(Serbia)	11	Bojan Matić	2	0	0	0	2
7	DF	(Uzbekistan)	88	Shahzod Azmiddinov	2	0	0	0	2
7				Own goal	2	0	0	0	2
12	DF	(Uzbekistan)	34	Farrukh Sayfiev	1	0	0	0	1
12	MF	(Uzbekistan)	28	Diyor Kholmatov	1	0	0	0	1
12	DF	(Uzbekistan)	21	Abror Ismoilov	0	1	0	0	1
12	MF	(Uzbekistan)	7	Odiljon Hamrobekov	0	1	0	0	1
12	FW	(Uzbekistan)	99	Po'latkhoja Kholdorkhonov	0	0	0	1	1
				TOTALS	49	4	1	6	60

=== Clean sheets ===
Place	Position	Nation	Number	Name	Super League	Uzbekistan Cup	Super Cup	AFC Champions League	Total
1	GK	(Uzbekistan)	35	Sanjar Kuvvatov	8	2	1	3	14
2	GK	(Uzbekistan)	25	Eldorbek Suyunov	7	0	0	0	7
				TOTALS	15	2	1	3	21

=== Disciplinary record ===
Number	Nation	Position	Name	Super League		Uzbekistan Cup		Super Cup		AFC Champions League		Total	
Number	Nation	Position	Name	Booked	Sent off (straight red)	Booked	Sent off (straight red)	Booked	Sent off (straight red)	Booked	Sent off (straight red)	Booked	Sent off (straight red)
3	(Uzbekistan)	DF	Khojiakbar Alijonov	3	0	0	0	0	0	0	0	3	0
5	(Uzbekistan)	DF	Anzur Ismailov	3	0	1	0	0	0	0	0	4	0
7	(Uzbekistan)	MF	Odiljon Hamrobekov	2	0	2	0	0	0	0	0	4	0
8	(Uzbekistan)	MF	Azizbek Turgunboev	3	0	0	0	0	0	0	0	3	0
9	(Uzbekistan)	MF	Sherzod Temirov	3	0	0	0	0	0	0	0	3	0
10	(Serbia)	FW	Dragan Ćeran	7	0	0	1	0	0	0	0	7	1
11	(Serbia)	FW	Bojan Matić	2	0	0	0	0	0	0	0	2	0
14	(Uzbekistan)	MF	Khumoyunmirzo Iminov	1	0	0	0	0	0	1	0	2	0
15	(Uzbekistan)	DF	Egor Krimets	2	1	0	0	0	0	2	0	4	1
16	(Uzbekistan)	MF	Marlen Chobanov	2	1	1	0	0	0	0	0	3	1
18	(Uzbekistan)	MF	Khojimat Erkinov	2	0	0	0	0	0	0	0	2	0
19	(Uzbekistan)	MF	Sharof Mukhiddinov	0	0	0	0	0	0	1	0	1	0
21	(Uzbekistan)	MF	Abror Ismoilov	7	0	3	0	0	0	2	0	12	0
23	(Uzbekistan)	DF	Sherzod Azamov	5	0	0	1	0	0	0	0	5	1
25	(Uzbekistan)	GK	Eldorbek Suyunov	3	0	0	0	0	0	0	0	3	0
27	(Uzbekistan)	MF	Sardor Sabirkhodjaev	2	0	0	0	0	0	1	0	3	0
34	(Uzbekistan)	DF	Farrukh Sayfiev	4	0	2	0	0	0	1	0	7	0
35	(Uzbekistan)	GK	Sanjar Kuvvatov	3	0	0	0	0	0	1	0	4	0
88	(Uzbekistan)	DF	Shahzod Azmiddinov	2	0	2	0	0	0	0	0	4	0
99	(Uzbekistan)	FW	Po'latkhoja Kholdorkhonov	1	0	0	0	0	0	0	0	1	0
Players who left Pakhtakor Tashkent during the season:
6	(Uzbekistan)	DF	Ibrokhimkhalil Yuldoshev	2	0	0	0	0	0	1	0	3	0
7	(Uzbekistan)	FW	Sardor Rashidov	0	0	0	0	0	0	1	0	1	0
			TOTALS	55	2	11	2	0	0	11	0	75	4
