= 2021 Uzbekistan Super Cup =

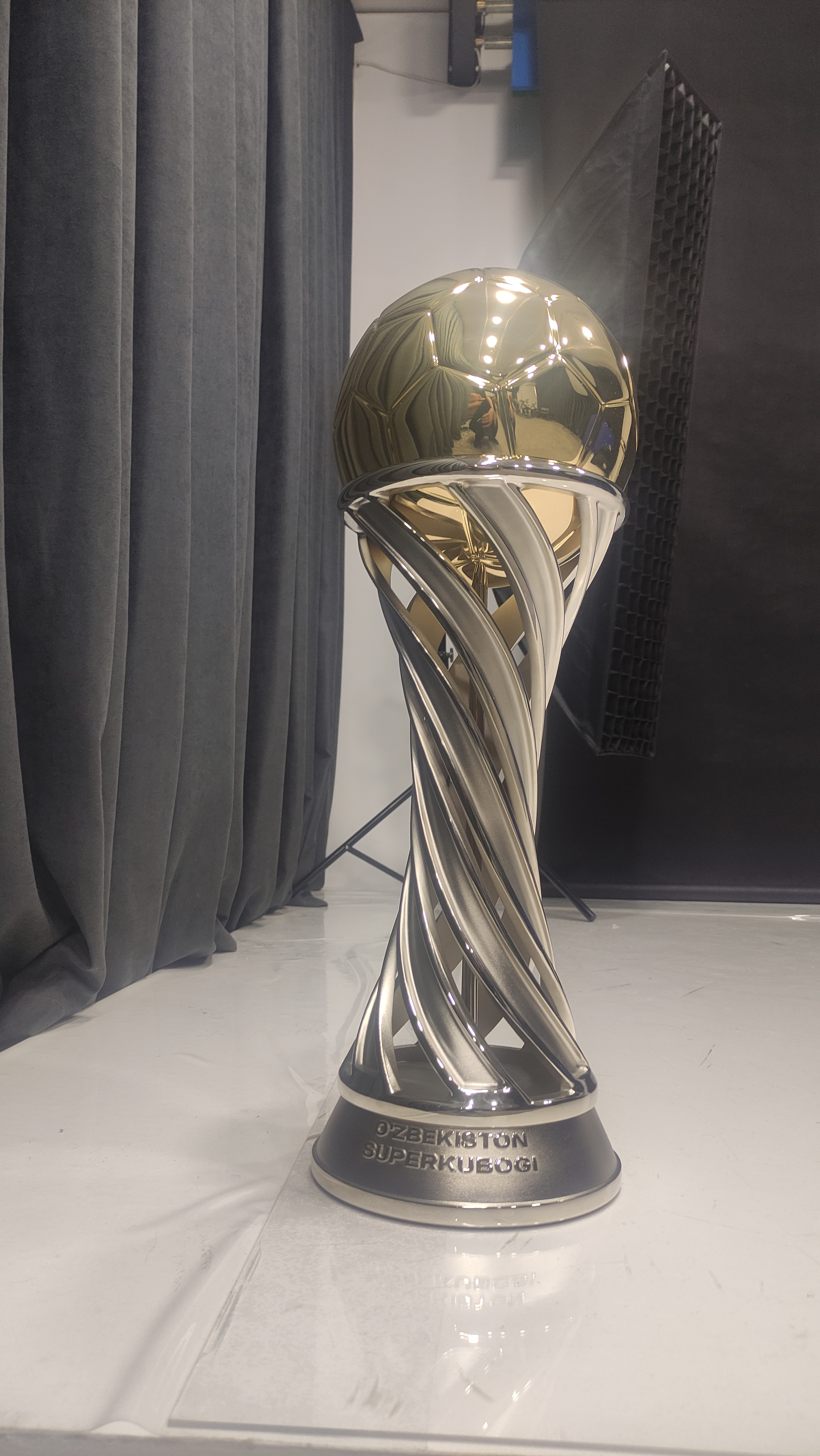
- Event: Uzbekistan Super Cup
Pakhtakor Tashkent	Nasaf
1	0
- Date: 6 March 2021
- Venue: Dinamo Stadium, Samarkand
- Referee: Vadim Agishev
- Attendance: 5,165
- Weather: Partly cloudy

The 2021 Uzbekistan Super Cup was the 6th Uzbekistan Super Cup, an annual football match played between the winners of the previous season's Super League and Cup. As Pakhtakor Tashkent completed a domestic League and Cup Double, second placed Super League Nasaf also took part in the match. Pakhtakor Tashkent won the match 1–0, securing their first Super Cup title.

== Match details ==
6 March 2021
16:00 UZT (UTC+5)

Pakhtakor Tashkent	1 – 0	Nasaf
Ćeran 50'	Report

Dinamo Stadium, Samarkand
Attendance: 5,165
Referee: Vadim Agishev

Pakhtakor Tashkent	Nasaf

GK	35	(Uzbekistan) Sanjar Kuvvatov
DF	3	(Uzbekistan) Khojiakbar Alijonov
DF	5	(Uzbekistan) Anzur Ismailov
DF	15	(Uzbekistan) Egor Krimets
DF	34	(Uzbekistan) Farrukh Sayfiev
MF	8	(Uzbekistan) Azizbek Turgunboev	(substituted off) 90'
MF	21	(Uzbekistan) Abror Ismoilov
MF	27	(Uzbekistan) Sardor Sabirkhodjaev	(substituted off) 87'
FW	7	(Uzbekistan) Sardor Rashidov
FW	9	(Switzerland) Eren Derdiyok	(substituted off) 79'
FW	10	(Serbia) Dragan Ćeran
Substitutes:
GK	44	(Uzbekistan) Azizkhon Isokov
DF	6	(Uzbekistan) Ibrokhimkhalil Yuldashev
MF	14	(Uzbekistan) Khumoyunmirzo Iminov
FW	17	(Uzbekistan) Sherzod Temirov	(substituted in) 87'
MF	18	(Uzbekistan) Khojimat Erkinov	(substituted in) 90'
MF	19	(Uzbekistan) Sharof Mukhiddinov	(substituted in) 79'
DF	23	(Uzbekistan) Sherzod Azamov
Manager:
(Netherlands) Pieter Huistra

GK	35	(Uzbekistan) Abduvohid Nematov
DF	4	(Uzbekistan) Husniddin Aliqulov	(yellow card) 71'
DF	5	(Uzbekistan) Golib Gaybullaev		(substituted off) 60'
DF	34	(Uzbekistan) Sherzod Nasrullaev
DF	92	(Uzbekistan) Umar Eshmurodov
MF	6	(Uzbekistan) Murodbek Khojamberdiev		(substituted off) 78'
MF	20	(Uzbekistan) Suxrob Nurulloev	(yellow card) 12'	(substituted off) 46'
MF	22	(Uzbekistan) Akmal Mozgovoy
MF	77	(Uzbekistan) Oybek Bozorov
MF	88	(Serbia) Marko Stanojević
FW	19	(Uzbekistan) Husain Norchaev
Substitutes:
GK	1	(Uzbekistan) Umidjon Ergashev
GK	13	(Uzbekistan) Azamat Soibov
MF	14	(Uzbekistan) Shokir Yuldashev		(substituted in) 46'
DF	15	(Uzbekistan) Jo'rabek Mannonov		(substituted in) 60'
FW	25	(Uzbekistan) Muhriddin Zoirov
MF	50	(Uzbekistan) Shoxmalik Kamilov		(substituted in) 78'
MF	70	(Uzbekistan) Abubakrrizo Turdialiev
Manager:
(Uzbekistan) Ruziqul Berdiyev

== See also ==
- 2021 Uzbekistan Super League
- 2021 Uzbekistan Cup
