= 2024 Uzbekistan Cup final =

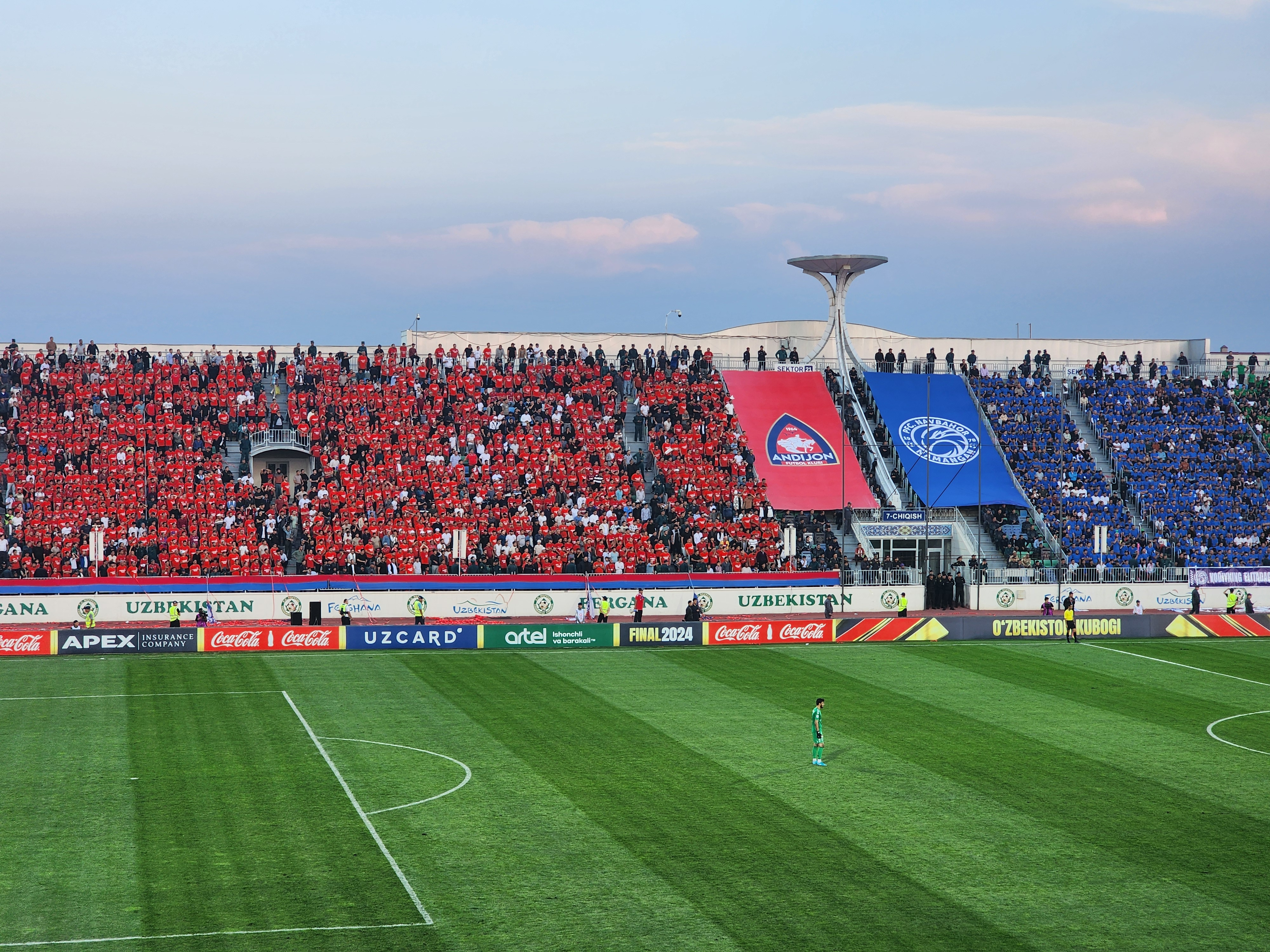
- Event: 2024 Uzbekistan Cup
Navbahor	Andijon
2	3
- Report
- Date: 5 October 2024
- Venue: Istiqlol Stadium, Fergana
- Man of the Match: Levan Arveladze
- Referee: Khalid Saleh Al-Turais (Saudi Arabia)
- Weather: Sunny

The 2024 Uzbekistan Cup final (in Uzbek: Футбол бўйича 2024-йилги Ўзбекистон Кубоги финали) was the 32nd final of the Uzbekistan Cup. The match was played on 5 October 2024, Saturday, at the "Istiqlol" Stadium in Fergana to determine the winner of 2024 Uzbekistan Cup. The match ended with Andijan's 3–2 victory over Navbahor.

== Venue ==
The final was staged at the "Istiqlol" Stadium in Fergana. Tickets for the final went on sale at the stadium ticket offices from 09:30 on 1 October. By 16:50 the same day, all tickets allocated for Fergana had been sold out. At all three stadiums, the iTicket online ticketing platform, the football clubs, the National Guard and officials of the League worked in cooperation to ensure, under the principle of mutual restraint, that tickets did not end up in the hands of scalpers and no hidden sales took place behind the counters.

== Road to the final ==
=== Navbahor ===
Navbahor's route to the final
	Opponent	Result
1	Nasaf	1–0
2	Andijan	2–1
3	Dinamo	1–1
R16	Bukhara	1–0
QF	Sogdiana	3–2 (a.e.t.)
SF	Pakhtakor	0–0 (a.e.t.) (4–3 p)

=== Andijon ===
Andijan's route to the final
	Opponent	Result
1	Dinamo	2–2
2	Navbahor	1–2
3	Nasaf	1–0
R16	Olimpik	1–0
ChF	Qizilqum	3–0
YF	Surxon	0–0 (a.e.t.) (5–4 p)

== Match ==
Navbahor	Andijon

GK	35	(Uzbekistan) Sanjar Kuvvatov
MF	8	(Iran) Siavash Hagh Nazari			(substituted off) 73'
MF	9	(Uzbekistan) Odil Hamrobekov		(yellow card) 98'
MF	10	(Uzbekistan) Jamshid Iskanderov (c)
DF	12	(Uzbekistan) Saidazamat Mirsaidov
DF	13	(Serbia) Filip Ivanović
MF	14	(Uzbekistan) Jamshid Boltaboev		(yellow card) 68'	(substituted off) 106'
FW	21	(Georgia (country)) Giorgi Nikabadze			(substituted off) 61'
DF	23	(Serbia) Jovan Đokić
DF	34	(Uzbekistan) Farrukh Sayfiev	119'
FW	77	(Uzbekistan) Abror Ismoilov	53'		(substituted off) 106'
Substitutions:
GK	18	(Uzbekistan) Eldorbek Suyunov
DF	7	(Uzbekistan) Azim Ahmedov
FW	11	(Uzbekistan) Sardor Rashidov			(substituted on) 73'
FW	17	(Uzbekistan) Ruslanbek Jiyanov			(substituted on) 61'
DF	20	(Uzbekistan) Muzaffar Muminov
FW	22	(Georgia (country)) Toma Tabatadze			(substituted on) 106'
MF	24	(Uzbekistan) Dostonbek Abdulhaev
MF	55	(Uzbekistan) Komiljon Tojiddinov			(substituted on) 106'
MF	71	(Uzbekistan) Navruzbek Iminjonov
Coach:
(Uzbekistan) Sergey Lushan

GK	1	(Uzbekistan) Eldor Adhamov
DF	5	(Uzbekistan) Abduvohid Gulomov			(substituted off) 90'
MF	8	(Uzbekistan) Farhod Bekmurodov			(substituted off) 65'
FW	10	(Uzbekistan) Ilhom Abduganiyev			(substituted off) 76'
MF	13	(Uzbekistan) Sardor Azimov			(substituted off) 90'
MF	14	(Uzbekistan) Abdurahmon Komilov		(yellow card) 37'	(substituted off) 106'
DF	15	(Serbia) Vladimir Bubanja	120+3'
MF	17	(Uzbekistan) Farhod Sohibjonov			(substituted off) 65'
DF	21	(Uzbekistan) Ildar Mamatkazin (c)
DF	26	(Uzbekistan) Muhammadkarim Toirov	82'
FW	77	(Uzbekistan) Rustam Turdimurodov		(yellow card) 120+4'
Substitutions:
GK	12	(Uzbekistan) Mohirbek Komilov
DF	9	(Georgia (country)) Levan Arveladze			(substituted on) 65'
FW	18	(Uzbekistan) Damir Temirov			(substituted on) 90'
MF	19	(Kazakhstan) Abinur Nurimbet
DF	28	(Uzbekistan) Islom Mamatkazin	116'		(substituted on) 106'
FW	51	(Uzbekistan) Luka Zgurskiy
DF	66	(Uzbekistan) Ilhom Alijonov			(substituted on) 90'
MF	71	(Uzbekistan) Bektemir Abdumannonov			(substituted on) 76'
FW	99	(Tajikistan) Shakhrom Samiev			(substituted on) 65'
Coach:
(Russia) Aleksandr Khomyakov

5 October 2024
17:00 UZT

(Uzbekistan) Navbahor	2–3	(Uzbekistan) Andijon
Ismoilov 53'; Sayfiyev 119'	Report	Toirov 82'; Mamatkazin 116'; Bubanja 120+3'

Istiqlol, Fergana
Attendance: 20,000
Referee: Khalid Saleh Al-Turais (Saudi Arabia)
