= 2026 FC Neftchi Fergana season =

Neftchi Fergana
2026 season
- CEO: Mansur Tashmatov
- Head coach: Islom Ismoilov
- Stadium: Istiqlol
- Uzbek League: 1st
- Uzbekistan Cup: Second Round
- Super Cup: Champions
- AFC Champions League Elite: Group stage
- Top goalscorer: League: Stipe Perica (7); All: Stipe Perica (9)
- Average home league attendance: 12,198
- Biggest win: 6–1 vs Guliston
- Biggest defeat: 0–1 vs Pakhtakor
Home colours	Away colours

The 2026 season marks the 30th season for the Fergana-based club Neftchi in the top league of Uzbek football and their 64th consecutive season overall. This season, in addition to the domestic championship and the Uzbekistan Cup, Neftchi is also competing in the Uzbekistan Super Cup and the AFC Elite Champions League.

== Kits ==
- Supplier: Adidas

Home	Away	Goalkeeper 1

== Management team ==
Position	Name
Head coach	(Uzbekistan) Islom Ismoilov
Assistant coaches	(Argentina) Juan Cruz Gill, (Uzbekistan) Anvar Berdiev, (Uzbekistan) Davron Ahmedov
Goalkeeping coach	(Moldova) Vitalie Galat
Fitness coach	(Greece) Antonios Sarioglou

- Last updated: 23 July 2026
- Source: FC Neftchi

== Squad ==
As of match played 21 July 2026

No.	Name	Nationality	Position	Date of birth (age)	Signed from	Signed in	Contract ends	Apps.	Goals
Goalkeepers
1	Botirali Ergashev	(Uzbekistan)	GK	23 June 1995 (age 31)	AGMK	2024	2027	62	0
45	Akbar Turaev	(Uzbekistan)	GK	27 August 1989 (age 37)	Surkhon	2021	2026	54	0
Defenders
2	Izzatillo Pulatov	(Uzbekistan)	DF	15 June 2003 (age 23)	Bukhara	2026	2028	7	0
4	Bojan Ciger	(Serbia)	DF	15 June 2003 (age 23)	Kedah Darul Aman	2024	2027	67	4
6	Ibrokhimkhalil Yuldoshev	(Uzbekistan)	DF	15 June 2003 (age 23)	Kairat	2025	2027	36	6
15	Nurmukhammad Abduganiev	(Uzbekistan)	DF	24 August 2007 (age 19)	Sementchi	2025	2028	4	0
20	Anvarzhon Gofurov	(Uzbekistan)	DF	28 June 1995 (age 31)	Metallurg	2023	2026	160	8
21	Muhsinzhon Ubaydullaev	(Uzbekistan)	DF	15 July 1994 (age 32)	Qizilqum	2022	2027	175	1
34	Farrukh Sayfiev	(Uzbekistan)	DF	15 July 1994 (age 32)	Navbahor	2025	2026	33	1
Midfielders
5	Ikromjon Alibaev	(Uzbekistan)	MF	9 January 1994 (age 32)	Seongnam	2025	2027	42	5
7	Abror Ismoilov	(Uzbekistan)	MF	9 January 1994 (age 32)	Navbahor	2025	2026	109	11
8	Vladimir Jovovic	(Montenegro)	MF	26 October 1994 (age 32)	Sogdiana	2025	2026	36	4
9	Khurshid Giyosov	(Uzbekistan)	MF	26 October 1994 (age 32)	AGMK	2026	2027	17	5
10	Jamshid Iskanderov	(Uzbekistan)	MF	26 October 1994 (age 32)	Navbahor	2025	2026	46	11
11	Asilbek Jumaev	(Uzbekistan)	MF	25 March 2005 (age 21)	Surkhon	2026	2028	15	2
23	Jovan Đokić	(Serbia)	MF	13 August 1992 (age 34)	Navbahor	2025	2026	42	6
30	Rustambek Fomin	(Uzbekistan)	MF	9 July 2005 (age 21)	Olympic MobiUz	2026	2028	7	1
77	Ratinho	(Brazil)	MF	1 October 1996 (age 30)	Dinamo Samarqand	2026	2027	16	3
Forwards
18	Stipe Perica	(Croatia)	FW	7 July 1995 (age 31)	Dinamo București	2026	2026	16	9
22	Alisher Odilov	(Uzbekistan)	FW	15 July 2001 (age 25)	Navbahor	2025	2027	27	6
32	Zoran Marušić	(Serbia)	FW	29 November 1993 (age 32)	Nasaf	2025	2026	16	9
U21
13	Abdulmumin Nurmuhammadov	(Uzbekistan)	GK	10 July 2006 (age 20)	Academy	2024	2026	0	0
16	Ibrokhim Shokirov	(Uzbekistan)	GK	18 March 2008 (age 18)	Pakhtakor	2026	2026	1	0
17	Aziz Murotov	(Tajikistan)	FW	22 February 2007 (age 19)	Surkhon	2025	2026	1	0
19	Azizbek Erimbetov	(Uzbekistan)	MF	29 May 2008 (age 18)	Jaykhun	2025	2028	2	0
24	Husanboy Umirzoqov	(Uzbekistan)	MF	25 December 2005 (age 20)	Academy	2025	2028	2	0
25	Omadillo Abdumannobov	(Uzbekistan)	MF	1 April 2005 (age 21)	Turon	2024	2026	0	0
27	Nurbek Sarsenbaev	(Uzbekistan)	FW	28 September 2008 (age 18)	Jaykhun	2025	2026	3	1
28	Mukhammadkodir Rasuljonov	(Uzbekistan)	DF	24 May 2007 (age 19)	Sementchi	2025	2028	1	0
29	Yahyokhon Isoqov	(Uzbekistan)	MF	23 March 2007 (age 19)	Olympic Tashkent	2025	2026	0	0
37	Javohirbek Mahmudov	(Uzbekistan)	DF	14 February 2007 (age 19)	Academy	2025	2026	0	0
40	Abdulloh Rashidov	(Uzbekistan)	DF	27 June 2007 (age 19)	Academy	2025	2026	0	0
42	Muhammadsohib Tursunov	(Uzbekistan)	DF	11 June 2006 (age 20)	Sementchi	2024	2026	0	0
44	Muminkhon Bakhodirkhonov	(Uzbekistan)	MF	30 March 2008 (age 18)	Ahmedov	2026	2028	1	0
50	Fayzullo Nurmuhammadov	(Uzbekistan)	DF	27 February 2005 (age 21)	Metallurg Bekabad	2026	2026	0	0
57	Sanjarbek Mahsudbekov	(Uzbekistan)	MF	22 November 2006 (age 19)	Academy	2023	2026	0	0
66	Hasanboy Umirzoqov	(Uzbekistan)	MF	25 December 2005 (age 20)	Academy	2023	2026	0	0
80	Albert Nurullayev	(Uzbekistan)	FW	8 October 2005 (age 21)	Bukhara	2026	2026	0	0
84	Dilshodjon Erkinov	(Uzbekistan)	DF	12 September 2004 (age 22)	Academy	2023	2026	0	0
97	Mirjalol Abdurahimov	(Uzbekistan)	DF	17 May 2006 (age 20)	Academy	2025	2026	0	0
Players away on loan
14	Farhod Sohibjonov	(Uzbekistan)	MF	14 November 2001 (age 24)	Andijon	2026	2028	0	0
14	Daler Tukhsanov	(Uzbekistan)	MF	9 July 2005 (age 21)	Olympic MobiUz	2026	2028	3	0
70	Sylvanus Nimely	(Liberia)	MF	4 September 1998 (age 28)	Sumgayit	2025	2026	6	0
Players who left during the season
90	Dilshodbek Sharafiddinov	(Uzbekistan)	DF	8 January 2006 (age 20)	Lokomotiv Tashkent	2025	2026	0	0

== Transfers ==
=== In ===
Date	Position	Nationality	Name	From	Fee	Ref.
27 December 2025	MF	(Brazil)	Jurani Ferreira	Dinamo Samarqand	Undisclosed	
27 December 2025	MF	(Uzbekistan)	Khurshid Giyosov	AGMK	Undisclosed	
27 December 2025	DF	(Uzbekistan)	Izzatillo Pulatov	Bukhara	Undisclosed	
27 December 2025	MF	(Uzbekistan)	Farkhod Sokhibzhonov	Andijon	Undisclosed	
27 December 2025	MF	(Uzbekistan)	Rustambek Fomin	Olympic MobiUz	Undisclosed	
27 December 2025	MF	(Uzbekistan)	Daler Tukhsanov	Olympic MobiUz	Undisclosed	
27 December 2025	MF	(Uzbekistan)	Muminkhon Bahodirkhonov	Ahmedov	Undisclosed	
27 December 2025	MF	(Uzbekistan)	Asilbek Jumaev	Surkhon	Undisclosed	

=== Out ===
Date	Position	Nationality	Name	To	Type	Ref.
31 December 2025	GK	(Uzbekistan)	Asror Kenzhaev	Gazalkent FC	End of contract	
31 December 2025	MF	(Uzbekistan)	Bilolkhon Toshmirzaev	Bunyodkor	End of contract	
31 December 2025	MF	(Uzbekistan)	Kuvondik Ruziev	Navbahor	End of contract	
31 December 2025	MF	(Uzbekistan)	Gulomkhaydar Gulyamov	Kokand 1912	End of contract	
31 December 2025	MF	(Kyrgyzstan)	Joel Kojo	Esteghlal	Loan return	
31 December 2025	MF	(Uzbekistan)	Shahzodzhon Nematzhonov	Bunyodkor	End of contract	

=== Contract renewals ===
Date	Pos.	Nationality	Player	Contract length	Contract ends	Ref.
27 December 2025	GK	(Uzbekistan)	Botirali Ergashev	Two years	2028	
27 December 2025	DF	(Uzbekistan)	Farrukh Sayfiev	One years	2027	
27 December 2025	MF	(Uzbekistan)	Ikromjon Alibaev	Two years	2028	
27 December 2025	DF	(Uzbekistan)	Muhsinzhon Ubaydullaev	Two years	2028	
29 December 2025	DF	(Uzbekistan)	Ibrokhimkhalil Yuldoshev	Two years	2028	
29 December 2025	DF	(Serbia)	Bojan Ciger	Two years	2028	
29 December 2025	GK	(Uzbekistan)	Akbar Turaev	One years	2027	

== Friendlies ==
Win Draw Loss Fixtures

12 January 2026	Qarabağ	5–0	Neftchi	Belek, Turkey
19:00 UZT (UTC+5)	Janković 3', 29'; Andrade 8'; Montiel 10'; Akhundzade 70'	Report		Stadium: Gloria Sports Arena

16 January 2026	Aluminij	1–2	Neftchi	Antalya, Turkey
17:30 UZT (UTC+5)	Saitoski 75'	Report	Alibaev 15'; Iskanderov 72'	Stadium: Gloria Sports Arena

20 January 2026	Neftchi	2–0	Septemvri Sofia	Belek, Turkey
16:30 UZT (UTC+5)	Marušić 28'; Sarsenbayev 83'	Report		Stadium: Gloria Sports Arena

29 January 2026	Arda Kardzhali	1–0	Neftchi	Belek, Turkey
17:30 UZT (UTC+5)	Velkovski 45+1'	Report		Stadium: Gloria Sports Arena

31 January 2026	Neftchi	1–2	Ferizaj	Belek, Turkey
17:30 UZT (UTC+5)	Ismoilov 51'	Report	Peposhi 4'; Sadriu 31'	Stadium: Gloria Palace Arena

5 February 2026	Neftchi	4–1	Bars	Belek, Turkey
17:30 UZT (UTC+5)	Odilov 32'; Fomin 30'; Marušić 37'; Abduganiev 90'	Report	Murzayev 24'	Stadium: Gloria Palace Arena

7 February 2026	Neftchi	2–1	Oleksandriya	Belek, Turkey
17:30 UZT (UTC+5)	Giyosov 22'; Nimely 79'	Report	Jota 78'	Stadium: Gloria Palace Arena

10 February 2026	Neftchi	4–1	Dinamo Batumi	Belek, Turkey
18:30 UZT (UTC+5)	Perica 25'; Ismoilov 62'; Giyosov 70'; Jumaev 85'	Report	Mandrîcenco 76'	Stadium: Gloria Palace Arena

14 February 2026	Neftchi	6–2	Alga Bishkek	Belek, Turkey
17:30 UZT (UTC+5)	Jumaev 44'; Fomin 51'; Sarsenbaev 66'; Ismoilov 74'; Iskanderov 85'; Đokić 90'	Report	Merk; Zinkevych 60'	Stadium: Gloria Palace Arena

17 February 2026	Irtysh Pavlodar	2–3	Neftchi	Belek, Turkey
15:30 UZT (UTC+5)	Shvyryov 22'; Player in review 77'	Report	Đokić 44'; Ismoilov 70'; Perica 80'	Stadium: Gloria Palace Arena

3 July 2026	Neftchi	2–1	Yaypan	Fergana, Uzbekistan
20:00 UZT (UTC+5)	Sarsenbayev 17'; Giyosov 90'	Report	Ibrohimjonov 31'	Stadium: Istiqlol Stadium; Referee: Sanjar Rahmonov

8 July 2026	Zenit Saint Petersburg	4–1	Neftchi	Saint Petersburg, Russia
19:00 UZT (UTC+5)	Augusto 21'; Glushenkov 34'; Sobolev 62'; Kondakov 73'	Report	Ismoilov 37'	Stadium: Krestovsky Stadium; Attendance: 13,255; Referee: Kirill Levnikov

== Competitions ==
=== Overview ===
Competition	First match	Last match	Starting round	Final position	Record							
Competition	First match	Last match	Starting round	Final position	Pld	W	D	L	GF	GA	GD	Win %
Super League	February 27, 2026		Matchday 1		26	19	4	3	61	23	+38	73.08
Uzbekistan Cup	May 13, 2026	October 20, 2026	Group stage	Quarter finals	5	3	1	1	15	7	+8	60.00
Super Cup	March 15, 2026	15 March 2026	Final	Winners	1	1	0	0	1	0	+1	100.00
AFC Champions League Elite	14 September 2026		League stage		4	1	1	2	5	7	−2	25.00
Total					36	24	6	6	82	37	+45	66.67

Last updated: 13 November 2026
Source: Competitions

=== Super Cup ===
15 March 2026	Neftchi Fergana	1–0	Pakhtakor	Andijan
19:30 UZT (UTC+5)	Ratinho 17' (yellow card) 67'; Gafurov (yellow card) 82'	Report		Stadium: Bobur Arena; Attendance: 16,821; Referee: Timur Tukhtasinov

=== Super League ===
==== League table ====
Pos	Team	Pld	W	D	L	GF	GA	GD	Pts	Qualification or relegation
1	Neftchi (A)	26	19	4	3	61	23	+38	61	Qualification for AFC Champions League Elite league stage
2	Pakhtakor (A)	27	17	8	2	48	26	+22	59	Qualification for the AFC Champions League Two group stage
3	Navbahor (A)	27	16	7	4	46	25	+21	55	Qualification for the Silk Way Cup group stage
4	Nasaf	27	12	9	6	39	23	+16	45	
5	OKMK	27	13	6	8	38	35	+3	45	

Updated to match(es) played on 8 November 2026. Source: Uzbekistan Professional Football League
Rules for classification: 1) Points; 2) Head-to-head points; 3) Head-to-head goal difference; 4) Head-to-head away goals scored; 5) Goal difference; 6) Number of goals scored.
(A) Advance to a further round

==== Results summary ====
Overall								Home						Away					
Pld	W	D	L	GF	GA	GD	Pts	W	D	L	GF	GA	GD	W	D	L	GF	GA	GD
26	19	4	3	61	23	+38	61	10	2	1	32	9	+23	9	2	2	29	14	+15

Last updated: 13 November 2026.
Source: See Results

==== Results by round ====
Round	1	2	3	4	5	6	7	8	9	10	11	12	13	14	15	16	17	18	19	20	21	22	23	24	25	26	27	28	29	30
Ground	H	A	H	H	A	H	A	H	A	H	A	H	A	H	A	H	A	A	H	A	H	A	H	A	A	H	H	A	H	A
Result	W	W	W	W	W	L	W	W	W	W	D	W	W	D	D	W	W	L	W	L	W	W	D	W	W		W			
Position	2	1	1	1	1	2	2	2	2	1	1	1	1	1	1	1	1	1	1	1	1	1	2	1	1	1	1			

Source: See Results
A = Away; H = Home; W = Win; D = Draw; L = Loss

=== Uzbek Cup ===
==== Group stage ====
11 May 2026 1	Neftchi	6–1	Guliston	Fergana
19:00 UZT (UTC+5)	Giyosov 17'; Marušić 20', 53'; Jovović 29' (yellow card) 57'; Jumaev 59', 68'	Report	Isaev (yellow card) 16'; Norbekov 48'; Sobirjonov (yellow card) 50'; Rajabov (yellow card) 87'	Stadium: Istiqlol Stadium; Attendance: 5210; Referee: Akmal Rakhimov

22 May 2026 2	Bukhara	0–0	Neftchi	Bukhara
19:00 UZT (UTC+5)	Begić (yellow card) 42'	Report	Jovović (yellow card) 24'	Stadium: Bukhara FA Stadium; Attendance: 6670; Referee: Jasur Mukhtorov

26 May 2026 3	Neftchi	6–2	BuxDU	Fergana
19:00 UZT (UTC+5)	Perica 12', 36'; Fomin 28'; Giyosov 45'; Sarsenbaev 69'; Ratinho 73'	Report	Ashurov 54'; Turaev 82'	Stadium: Istiqlol Stadium; Attendance: 2153; Referee: Gayrat Juraev

==== Knockout stages ====
29 August 2026 Last 16	Neftchi Fergana	1–0	Pakhtakor	Fergana
UZT (UTC+5)	Perica 81'	Report		Stadium: Istiqlol Stadium; Attendance: 18777; Referee: Shavkat Nasibullayev

October 20, 2026 Quarter-finals	Neftchi	2–4	Lokomotiv	Fergana
(UTC+5)	Giyosov 36'; Ismoilov 45+3'	Report	11', 33' Yakhshiboev; 25' Tupliev; 43' Turapov	Stadium: Istiqlol Stadium; Attendance: 9113; Referee: Rustam Choriev

=== AFC Champions League Elite ===
==== League stage ====
Round	1
Ground	
Result	
Position	
Points	

Source: AFC
A = Away; H = Home; W = Win; D = Draw; L = Loss

== Squad statistics ==
As of match played 21 July 2026

=== Appearances and goals ===
No.	Pos	Nat	Player	Total		Super League		Uzbek Cup		Super Cup		AFC Champions League Elite	
No.	Pos	Nat	Player	Apps	Goals	Apps	Goals	Apps	Goals	Apps	Goals	Apps	Goals
1	GK	(Uzbekistan) UZB	Botirali Ergashev	16	0	15	0	0	0	1	0	0	0
2	DF	(Uzbekistan) UZB	Izzatillo Pulatov	8	0	6	0	2	0	0	0	0	0
4	DF	(Serbia) SRB	Bojan Ciger	17	1	13	1	3	0	1	0	0	0
5	MF	(Uzbekistan) UZB	Ikromjon Alibaev	12	1	8	1	3	0	1	0	0	0
6	DF	(Uzbekistan) UZB	Ibrokhimkhalil Yuldoshev	14	2	13	2	0	0	1	0	0	0
7	MF	(Uzbekistan) UZB	Abror Ismoilov	13	1	11	1	1	0	1	0	0	0
8	MF	(Montenegro) MNE	Vladimir Jovović	18	1	15	0	2	1	1	0	0	0
9	MF	(Uzbekistan) UZB	Khurshid Giyosov	19	5	15	3	3	2	1	0	0	0
10	MF	(Uzbekistan) UZB	Jamshid Iskanderov	16	4	15	4	0	0	1	0	0	0
11	MF	(Uzbekistan) UZB	Asilbek Jumaev	16	2	12	0	3	2	1	0	0	0
14	DF	(Uzbekistan) UZB	Daler Tukhsanov †	3	0	1	0	2	0	0	0	0	0
15	DF	(Uzbekistan) UZB	Nurmukhammad Abduganiev	6	0	5	0	1	0	0	0	0	0
16	GK	(Uzbekistan) UZB	Ibrohim Shokirov	1	0	0	0	1	0	0	0	0	0
18	FW	(Croatia) CRO	Stipe Perica	18	9	14	7	3	2	1	0	0	0
19	MF	(Uzbekistan) UZB	Azizbek Yerimbetov	1	0	0	0	1	0	0	0	0	0
20	DF	(Uzbekistan) UZB	Anvarjon Gofurov	16	3	13	3	2	0	1	0	0	0
21	DF	(Uzbekistan) UZB	Muhsinjon Ubaydullaev	12	0	9	0	3	0	0	0	0	0
22	FW	(Uzbekistan) UZB	Alisher Odilov	15	3	14	3	0	0	1	0	0	0
23	MF	(Serbia) SRB	Jovan Đokić	15	3	12	3	2	0	1	0	0	0
27	FW	(Uzbekistan) UZB	Nurbek Sarsenbaev	3	1	1	0	2	1	0	0	0	0
28	DF	(Uzbekistan) UZB	Muhammadqodir Rasuljonov	1	0	0	0	1	0	0	0	0	0
30	MF	(Uzbekistan) UZB	Rustambek Fomin	8	1	5	0	3	1	0	0	0	0
32	FW	(Serbia) SRB	Zoran Marušić	19	6	15	4	3	2	1	0	0	0
34	DF	(Uzbekistan) UZB	Farrukh Sayfiev	15	0	14	0	0	0	1	0	0	0
44	MF	(Uzbekistan) UZB	Muminkhon Bahodirkhonov	1	0	0	0	1	0	0	0	0	0
45	GK	(Uzbekistan) UZB	Akbar Turaev	2	0	0	0	2	0	0	0	0	0
77	MF	(Brazil) BRA	Jurani Ferreira	19	3	15	1	3	1	1	1	0	0

^{†} Player left Fergana during the season.

=== Goal scorers ===
Rank	No.	Pos.	Nat.	Player	Super League	Uzbekistan Cup	Super Cup	AFC Champions League Elite	Total
1	18	FW	(Croatia)	Stipe Perica	7	2	0	0	9
2	32	FW	(Serbia)	Zoran Marušić	4	2	0	0	6
3	9	MF	(Uzbekistan)	Khurshid Giyosov	3	2	0	0	5
4	10	MF	(Uzbekistan)	Jamshid Iskanderov	4	0	0	0	4
5	22	FW	(Uzbekistan)	Alisher Odilov	3	0	0	0	3
5	23	MF	(Serbia)	Jovan Đokić	3	0	0	0	3
5	20	MF	(Uzbekistan)	Anvarzhon Gofurov	3	0	0	0	3
6	77	MF	(Brazil)	Jurani Ferreira	0	1	1	0	2
6	6	MF	(Uzbekistan)	Ibrokhimkhalil Yuldoshev	2	0	0	0	2
6	11	MF	(Uzbekistan)	Asilbek Jumaev	0	2	0	0	2
7	8	MF	(Montenegro)	Vladimir Jovović	0	1	0	0	1
7	30	MF	(Uzbekistan)	Rustambek Fomin	0	1	0	0	1
7	27	FW	(Uzbekistan)	Nurbek Sarsenbaev	0	1	0	0	1
7	20	MF	(Uzbekistan)	Bojan Ciger	1	0	0	0	1
7	20	MF	(Uzbekistan)	Ikromjon Alibaev	1	0	0	0	1
7	20	MF	(Uzbekistan)	Abror Ismoilov	1	0	0	0	1
Totals					33	12	1	0	46

=== Clean sheets ===
Rank	No.	Nat.	Player	Uzbekistan Super League	Uzbekistan Cup	Uzbekistan Super Cup	Champions League Elite	Total
1	1	(Uzbekistan)	Botirali Ergashev	9	—	1	—	10
2	45	(Uzbekistan)	Akbar Turaev	—	1	—	—	1
Totals				9	1	1	0	11

=== Disciplinary record ===
Number	Nation	Position	Name	Super League		Uzbekistan Cup		Super Cup		AFC Champions League Elite		Total	
Number	Nation	Position	Name	Yellow card	Red card	Yellow card	Red card	Yellow card	Red card	Yellow card	Red card	Yellow card	Red card
2	(Uzbekistan)	DF	Izzatillo Pulatov	2	1	0	0	0	0	0	0	2	1
5	(Uzbekistan)	MF	Ikromjon Alibaev	3	0	0	0	0	0	0	0	3	0
6	(Uzbekistan)	DF	Ibrokhimkhalil Yuldoshev	2	0	0	0	0	0	0	0	2	0
7	(Uzbekistan)	MF	Abror Ismoilov	1	0	0	0	0	0	0	0	1	0
8	(Montenegro)	MF	Vladimir Jovovic	2	0	2	0	0	0	0	0	4	0
9	(Uzbekistan)	MF	Khurshid Giyosov	1	0	0	0	0	0	0	0	1	0
10	(Uzbekistan)	MF	Jamshid Iskanderov	2	0	0	0	0	0	0	0	2	0
11	(Uzbekistan)	MF	Asilbek Jumaev	1	0	0	0	0	0	0	0	1	0
15	(Uzbekistan)	DF	Nurmukhammad Abduganiev	1	0	0	0	0	0	0	0	1	0
18	(Croatia)	FW	Stipe Perica	1	0	0	0	0	0	0	0	1	0
20	(Uzbekistan)	DF	Anvarzhon Gofurov	2	0	0	0	1	0	0	0	3	0
21	(Uzbekistan)	DF	Muhsinjon Ubaydullayev	2	0	0	0	0	0	0	0	2	0
22	(Uzbekistan)	FW	Alisher Odilov	1	0	0	0	0	0	0	0	1	0
23	(Serbia)	MF	Jovan Đokić	1	0	0	0	0	0	0	0	1	0
30	(Uzbekistan)	MF	Rustambek Fomin	1	0	0	0	0	0	0	0	1	0
34	(Uzbekistan)	DF	Farrukh Sayfiev	3	0	0	0	0	0	0	0	3	0
77	(Brazil)	MF	Jurani Ferreira	2	0	0	0	1	0	0	0	3	0
Players away on loan:
Players who left Neftchi Fergana during the season:
			TOTALS	28	1	2	0	0	0	0	0	30	1
