= Marcus Forss =

Finnish footballer (born 1999)

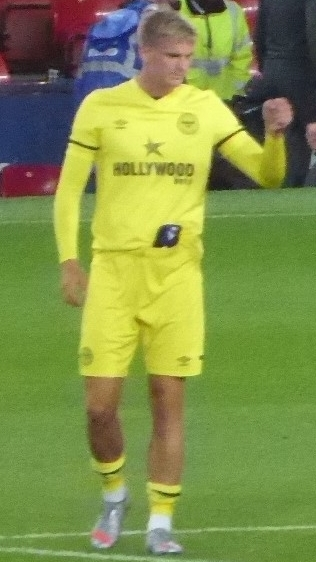
- Forss following a Brentford match in 2021

Personal information
- Full name: Marcus Uolevi Forss
- Date of birth: 18 June 1999 (age 27)
- Place of birth: Turku, Finland
- Height: 1.82 m (6 ft 0 in)
- Positions: Forward; winger

Team information
- Current team: Neftchi Fergana
- Number: 88

Youth career
- Ruskon Pallo
- TuWe
- –2012: FDS-WBA Finland
- 2012–2017: West Bromwich Albion
- 2017–2018: Brentford

Senior career*
| Years | Team | Apps | (Gls) |
| 2018–2022 | Brentford | 54 | (8) |
| 2019–2020 | → AFC Wimbledon (loan) | 18 | (11) |
| 2022 | → Hull City (loan) | 11 | (1) |
| 2022–2026 | Middlesbrough | 84 | (18) |
| 2025–2026 | → Bolton Wanderers (loan) | 18 | (2) |
| 2026– | Neftchi Fergana | 0 | (0) |

International career^{‡}
| | Finland U17 | 4 | (2) |
| 2016–2017 | Finland U18 | 5 | (4) |
| 2017–2018 | Finland U19 | 6 | (3) |
| 2018–2020 | Finland U21 | 5 | (2) |
| 2020– | Finland | 21 | (2) |
- * Club domestic league appearances and goals as of 20:57, 24 October 2026 (UTC) ‡ National team caps and goals as of 18:16, 24 November 2024 (UTC)

Marcus Uolevi Forss (born 18 June 1999) is a Finnish professional footballer who plays as a forward for Uzbekistan Super League club Neftchi Fergana. He plays for the Finland national team at international level.

Forss is a graduate of the West Bromwich Albion academy and after transferring to Brentford B in 2017, he was promoted into the first team squad in 2018. Following four seasons with Brentford, Forss transferred to Middlesbrough in 2022. After four years of injuries and being deployed out of position, he was released in 2026 and transferred to Uzbeki club Neftchi Fergana. Forss made his international debut for Finland in November 2020 and was a member of Finland's Euro 2020 squad.

== Club career ==
=== Early years ===
A forward, Forss began his career in his native Finland with spells at FC Ruskon Pallo, TuWe and the FDS-Suomi football school. At age 13, he moved to England to join the academy at Premier League club West Bromwich Albion and progressed to sign a two-year scholarship deal in 2015.

He was called into the U21 squad for two EFL Trophy matches in the first half of the 2016–17 season and made one appearance, with a start in a 2–0 group stage defeat to Gillingham on 8 November 2016. Forss was released when his scholarship ended in May 2017.

=== Brentford ===
==== 2017–2019 ====
On 22 June 2017, Forss joined the B team at Championship club Brentford on a two-year contract. After scoring 11 goals in his first 23 B team appearances, he signed a new 3 1/2-year contract in February 2018.

He finished the 2017–18 season as the B team's top scorer with 21 goals and won both of the team's Player of the Year awards. Forss was promoted into the first team squad for the 2018–19 season and despite missing five months of the campaign with a back injury, he was a regular inclusion in matchday squads when fit and finished the season with 9 appearances and two goals.

==== 2019–20 season and loan to AFC Wimbledon ====
After one goal in three early-2019–20 season appearances, Forss signed a new four-year contract and joined League One club AFC Wimbledon on loan until the end of the 2019–20 season. He scored seven goals in his first seven appearances for the club and scored the first senior hat-trick of his career in a 4–1 victory over Southend United on 12 October.

Four goals in five appearances in October 2019 won Forss the EFL Young Player of the Month award. Four further goals in December 2019 saw him nominated for the League One Player of the Month award. By the time his spell was ended early by a season-ending torn hamstring on 14 January 2020, he had scored 11 goals in 19 appearances. Forss' performances during the season were recognised with the AFC Wimbledon Young Player of the Year award.

==== 2020–21 season ====
Following surgery on his torn hamstring, Forss returned fit for the 2020–21 season and the departures of Ollie Watkins and Saïd Benrahma elevated him to second-choice behind new signing Ivan Toney. For two-thirds of the season he served predominantly as a substitute, playing forward and wing roles. Off the back of a spell of seven goals in 13 appearances, Forss signed a new 5 1/2-year contract in December 2020.

In April 2021, a change in formation allowed Forss to break into the starting lineup, as one of two forwards alongside Ivan Toney. His first appearance as part of the new formation saw him score his first goal for over five months, in a 5–0 win over Preston North End. Brentford qualified for the promotion playoffs and playing as a substitute in the semi-final second leg versus Bournemouth, Forss scored the 81st-minute goal which secured a 3–2 aggregate victory and sent the Bees to a second consecutive playoff Final. Forss' 2020–21 season ended with 50 appearances, 10 goals and promotion to the Premier League after a 2–0 victory over Swansea City in the playoff Final.

==== 2021–2022 and loan to Hull City ====
Forss began the 2021–22 season principally involved in Brentford's EFL Cup campaign, with his starting performances in second and third round matches versus Forest Green Rovers and Oldham Athletic yielding five goals. His four-goal haul in the latter match was recognised with a place in the EFL Cup Team of the Round and a nomination for Player of the Round. Forss' 2021–22 EFL Cup performances were later recognised with a place in the Team of the Tournament and his five goals scored in the tournament tied him with Eddie Nketiah as top-scorer. By the final day of the winter transfer window,

Forss had scored six goals in 12 appearances, but with no goals in seven Premier League appearances. In need of "more consistent game time", Forss joined Championship club Hull City on loan until the end of the 2021–22 season. Deployed in a mix of starting and substitute roles, Forss made 11 appearances during his spell and scored one goal, in a 1–1 draw with Queens Park Rangers on 19 February 2022.

Ahead of the 2022–23 season, Forss was not called into Brentford's pre-season training camp in Germany and he transferred out of the club in July 2022. He scored 19 goals in 74 appearances during four seasons as a first team player with the club. Forss' 9 EFL Cup goals tied the club record.

=== Middlesbrough ===
==== 2022–23 season ====
On 28 July 2022, Forss transferred to Championship club Middlesbrough and signed a four-year contract for an undisclosed fee, reported to be £3 million. He scored his first goal for the club on his second appearance, in a 3–2 defeat to Queens Park Rangers on 6 August 2022. Following the sacking of manager Chris Wilder and the appointment of Michael Carrick on 24 October 2022, Forss ended a three-month goal drought. After being deployed on the right wing in late December 2022, he scored five goals in 9 appearances. By the time the 2022–23 season ended with defeat in the playoff semi-finals, Forss had scored 10 goals in 42 appearances.

==== 2023–2025 ====
Either side of being sidelined for 2 1/2 months by a thigh problem suffered in late October 2023, Forss made 23 appearances and scored seven goals during the 2023–24 season, in a mix of starting and substitute roles. Forss missed the final month of the 2023–24 season with a hamstring injury, which kept him out for the opening seven weeks of 2024–25. Forss made four substitute appearances before suffering a setback, which caused him to miss six weeks. He ended a mid-table 2024–25 season with one goal and 25 appearances, predominantly as a substitute.

==== 2025–26 season and loan to Bolton Wanderers ====
After making just two substitute appearances during the opening three weeks of the 2025–26 season, Forss joined League One club Bolton Wanderers on loan until the end of the season. He scored five goals in 25 appearances, prior to undergoing surgery on a season-ending torn hamstring in mid-January 2026. In his absence, the club was promoted to the Championship after victory in the 2026 League One playoff final. Forss was released by Middlesbrough when his contract expired at the end of the season. He ended his four seasons at the Riverside with 92 appearances and 18 goals. While a free agent, Forss conduced further fitness work with Bolton Wanderers during the 2026–27 pre-season period. He was included in the squad for a training camp in Slovakia and played in friendly matches, but did not win a contract.

=== Neftchi Fergana ===
On 14 September 2026, Forss transferred to Uzbekistan Super League club Neftchi Fergana. He signed a contract to play exclusively in the 2026–27 AFC Champions League Elite.

== International career ==
Forss was capped by Finland at U17, U18, U19 and U21 level. He captained the U19 team, but was not included in the squad for the 2018 European U19 Championship on home soil due to club commitments. Good goalscoring form at club level saw Forss receive his maiden call up to the senior team for a series of three matches in November 2020.

He made his debut with a start in a friendly versus France and scored the opening goal in the 2–0 victory. Forss was named in Finland's Euro 2020 squad and made two substitute appearances prior to the team's group stage exit. He made two appearances during Finland's failed 2022 World Cup qualification campaign, scoring one goal, which came in a 3–1 victory over Bosnia and Herzegovina in the penultimate group stage match.

== Personal life ==
Forss hails from a football family. His father Tero Forss and brother Niclas are both involved in football, and his grandfather is former Finland international Rainer Forss. Growing up he was a Manchester United supporter.

== Career statistics ==
=== Club ===
As of match played 12 October 2026

Appearances and goals by club, season and competition
| Club | Season | League | | | FA Cup | | EFL Cup | | Continental | | Other | | Total | |
| Club | Season | Division | Apps | Goals | Apps | Goals | Apps | Goals | Apps | Goals | Apps | Goals | Apps | Goals |
|---|---|---|---|---|---|---|---|---|---|---|---|---|---|---|
| West Bromwich Albion U21 | 2016–17 | — | | | | | | | | | 1 (Note: Appearance(s) in EFL Trophy) | 0 | 1 | 0 |
| Brentford | 2018–19 | Championship | 6 | 1 | 1 | 0 | 2 | 1 | — | | — | | 9 | 2 |
| Brentford | 2019–20 | Championship | 2 | 0 | 0 | 0 | 1 | 1 | — | | 0 | 0 | 3 | 1 |
| Brentford | 2020–21 | Championship | 39 | 7 | 2 | 0 | 6 | 2 | — | | 3 (Note: Appearances in Championship play-offs) | 1 | 50 | 10 |
| Brentford | 2021–22 | Premier League | 7 | 0 | 1 | 1 | 4 | 5 | — | | — | | 12 | 6 |
| Brentford | Total | | 54 | 8 | 4 | 1 | 13 | 9 | — | | 3 | 1 | 74 | 19 |
| AFC Wimbledon (loan) | 2019–20 | League One | 18 | 11 | 0 | 0 | — | | — | | 1 | 0 | 19 | 11 |
| Hull City (loan) | 2021–22 | Championship | 11 | 1 | — | | — | | — | | — | | 11 | 1 |
| Middlesbrough | 2022–23 | Championship | 38 | 10 | 1 | 0 | 1 | 0 | — | | 2 | 0 | 42 | 10 |
| Middlesbrough | 2023–24 | Championship | 21 | 7 | 0 | 0 | 2 | 0 | — | | — | | 23 | 7 |
| Middlesbrough | 2024–25 | Championship | 24 | 1 | 1 | 0 | 0 | 0 | — | | — | | 25 | 1 |
| Middlesbrough | 2025–26 | Championship | 1 | 0 | — | | 1 | 0 | — | | — | | 2 | 0 |
| Middlesbrough | Total | | 84 | 18 | 2 | 0 | 4 | 0 | — | | 2 | 0 | 92 | 18 |
| Bolton Wanderers (loan) | 2025–26 | League One | 18 | 2 | 2 | 0 | — | | — | | 5 | 3 | 25 | 5 |
| Neftchi Fergana | 2026 | — | | | | | | | 1 (Note: Appearance in AFC Champions League Elite) | 0 | — | | 1 | 0 |
| Career total | | | 185 | 40 | 8 | 1 | 17 | 9 | 1 | 0 | 12 | 4 | 222 | 54 |

=== International ===
As of match played 17 October 2023

Appearances and goals by national team and year
| National team | Year | Apps | Goals |
|---|---|---|---|
| Finland | 2020 | 3 | 1 |
| Finland | 2021 | 8 | 1 |
| Finland | 2022 | 6 | 0 |
| Finland | 2023 | 4 | 0 |
| Total | | 21 | 2 |

Scores and results list Finland's goal tally first, score column indicates score after each Forss goal.

List of international goals scored by Marcus Forss
| No. | Date | Venue | Opponent | Score | Result | Competition | Ref. |
|---|---|---|---|---|---|---|---|
| 1 | 11 November 2020 | Stade de France, Paris, France | France | 1–0 | 2–0 | Friendly | |
| 2 | 13 November 2021 | Bilino Polje Stadium, Zenica, Bosnia and Herzegovina | Bosnia and Herzegovina | 1–0 | 3–1 | 2022 FIFA World Cup qualification | |

== Honours ==
Brentford

- EFL Championship play-offs: 2021

Individual

- Brentford B Mary Halder Award: 2017–18
- Brentford B Player of the Year: 2017–18
- AFC Wimbledon Young Player of the Year: 2019–20
- EFL Young Player of the Month: October 2019
- EFL Cup Top Goalscorer: 2021–22
- EFL Cup Team of the Tournament: 2021–22
