= Tero Forss =

Finnish footballer (born 1968)

Personal information
- Date of birth: 12 July 1968 (age 58)
- Place of birth: Finland
- Height: 1.83 m (6 ft 0 in)
- Positions: Forward; midfielder

Team information
- Current team: KaaPo Women (joint-manager)

Youth career
- 1979–1981: Pyrkivä Turku
- 1982–1984: ÅIFK

Senior career*
Years	Team	Apps	(Gls)
1985	ÅIFK		(9)
1986–1987	SalPa		(10)
1988	ÅIFK	22	(11)
1989	Reipas Lahti	27	(10)
1990	RoPS	23	(5)
1991	TPS	20	(6)
1991–1992	RoPS	38	(5)
1993–2001	Inter Turku	182	(74)
1997	→ VG-62 (loan)	1	(0)
2001	VG-62	8	(0)
2002–2005	FC Boda	68	(12)
2008–2010	TuWe	18	(1)

International career
1984	Finland U16	4	(0)
1985	Finland U17	7	(1)

Managerial career
- 2003–2005: FC Boda (player-manager)
- 2010: TuWe
- 2015: FC Boda
- 2016–2017: BK-46
- 2021–: KaaPo Women (joint-manager)
- * Club domestic league appearances and goals

Tero Forss (born 12 July 1968) is a retired Finnish professional footballer, best remembered for his eight years as a forward and midfielder with Inter Turku, for whom he is the record scorer and a member of the club's Hall of Fame. After retiring as a player, he became a manager and managed FC Boda, TuWe and BK-46. As of October 2021, together with Markku Tolonen, he was joint-manager of KaaPo Women.

== Personal life ==
Forss is a member of a football family. His father (Rainer) was a player, manager and coach and his sons Marcus and Niclas are involved in football.

== Honours ==
- Inter Turku Hall of Fame
- Veikkausliiga Hall of Fame
