= Rainer Forss =

Finnish footballer (1930–2005)

- Forss with the Finland national team in 1953

Personal information
- Date of birth: 20 October 1930
- Place of birth: Finland
- Date of death: 2 August 2005 (aged 74)
- Position: Forward

Youth career
- 1949–: Pyrkivä Turku

Senior career*
Years	Team	Apps	(Gls)
1949–1956	Pyrkivä Turku		(70)
1956–1957	TuTo		(17)
1958–1959	TuWe		(5)
1960–1963	TuTo		(55)
1964	Pargas IF		
1964–1965	TPS		
1979	Pyrkivä Turku	1	(0)

International career
1951–1957	Finland	14	(0)
1951–1962	Finland B	10	(1)
1959–1960	Finland Olympic	4	(0)

Managerial career
- 1965–1970: TPS
- 1985: TPS
- * Club domestic league appearances and goals

Rainer Forss (20 October 1930 – 2 August 2005) was a Finnish professional football player, manager and coach. A forward player, he won full, Olympic and B caps for Finland at international level and was a member of Finland's 1952 Summer Olympics squad. In addition to playing 12 Suomensarja seasons, he scored 43 goals in 72 Mestaruussarja appearances.

== Personal life ==
Forss is a member of a football family. His son (Tero) and grandsons Marcus and Niclas are all involved in football.

== Honours ==
=== As a player ===
Pyrkivä Turku

- Mestaruussarja: 1954

=== As a manager ===
TPS

- Mestaruussarja: 1968

=== As an individual ===
- Mestaruussarja top-scorer: 1953
