= Ibrokhimkhalil Yuldoshev =

Uzbekistani footballer (born 2001)

Ibrohimhalil Yoʻldoshev
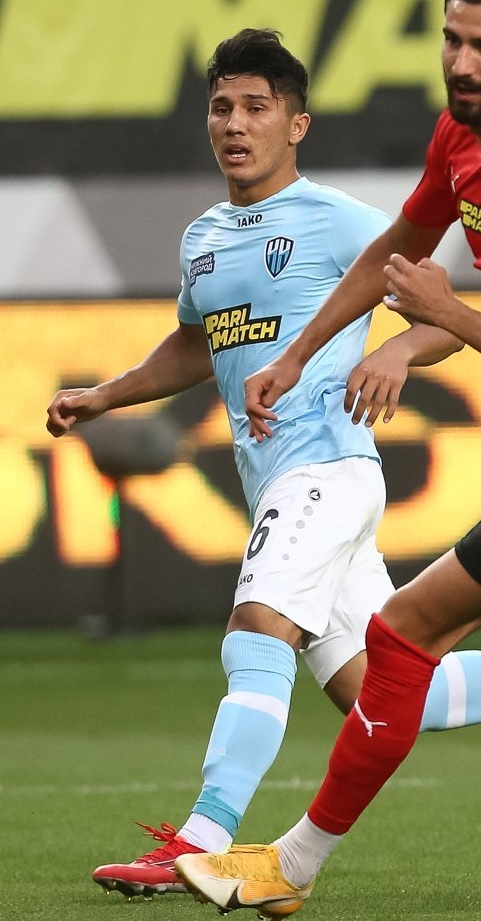

Personal information
- Full name: Ibrohimhalil Xabibulla oʻgʻli Yoʻldoshev
- Date of birth: 14 February 2001 (age 25)
- Place of birth: Yangiyer, Uzbekistan
- Height: 1.72 m (5 ft 8 in)
- Position: Left back

Team information
- Current team: Neftchi
- Number: 6

Youth career
- –2019: Pakhtakor-2

Senior career*
Years	Team	Apps	(Gls)
2019–2021	Pakhtakor	13	(2)
2020	→ Bunyodkor (loan)	21	(1)
2021–2025	Pari NN	51	(3)
2024	→ Kairat (loan)	17	(1)
2025–	Neftchi	33	(6)

International career^{‡}
2019–2020	Uzbekistan U19	8	(0)
2023–	Uzbekistan U23	3	(0)
2020–	Uzbekistan	16	(1)
Medal record
Men's football
Representing Uzbekistan
CAFA Nations Cup
Runner-up	2023 Kyrgyzstan–Uzbekistan	Team
Winner	2025 Tajikistan–Uzbekistan	Team
Asian Games
Bronze medal – third place	2022 Hangzhou	Team
AFC U-23 Asian Cup
Silver medal – second place	2024 Qatar	Team
- * Club domestic league appearances and goals as of 20:15, 28 July 2026 (UTC) ‡ National team caps and goals as of 12 September 2023 (UTC)

Ibrohimhalil Xabibulla oʻgʻli Yoʻldoshev (born 14 February 2001) is an Uzbek professional footballer who plays as a left back for Uzbekistan Super League club Neftchi and the Uzbekistan national team.

== Career ==
=== Club ===
On 26 August 2021, Yoʻldoshev signed with Russian Premier League club FC Nizhny Novgorod. On 20 April 2022, Yoʻldoshev signed a new three-year contract with Nizhny Novgorod.

On 15 January 2024, Kairat announced the signing of Yoʻldoshev on a year-long loan deal from Nizhny Novgorod.

On 29 January 2025, Yoʻldoshev signed a one year contract with Neftchi.

=== International ===
Yoʻldoshev made his debut for the senior national team of Uzbekistan on 3 September 2020 in a friendly match against Tajikistan. He was named in the 40-man preliminary squad for the 2026 FIFA World Cup; however, he had to withdraw later due to injury.

== Career statistics ==
=== Club ===
As of match played 28 July 2026

Appearances and goals by club, season and competition
Club	Season	League			Cup		Continental		Other		Total	
Club	Season	Division	Apps	Goals	Apps	Goals	Apps	Goals	Apps	Goals	Apps	Goals
Pakhtakor Tashkent	2019	Uzbekistan Super League	1	0	0	0	0	0	—		1	0
Pakhtakor Tashkent	2021	Uzbekistan Super League	12	2	0	0	5 (Note: Appearances in the AFC Champions League)	0	—		17	2
Pakhtakor Tashkent	Total		13	2	0	0	5	0	—		18	2
Bunyodkor (loan)	2020	Uzbekistan Super League	21	1	1	0	0	0	—		22	1
Nizhny Novgorod	2021–22	Russian Premier League	19	1	2	0	–		—		21	1
Nizhny Novgorod	2022–23	Russian Premier League	28	2	6	0	–		2 (Note: Appearances in the Relegation Play-off)	0	36	2
Nizhny Novgorod	2023–24	Russian Premier League	4	0	2	0	–		—		6	0
Nizhny Novgorod	Total		51	3	10	0	0	0	2	0	63	3
Kairat (loan)	2024	Kazakhstan Premier League	17	1	2	0	—				19	1
Neftchi Fergana	2025	Uzbekistan Premier League	21	4	1	0	–		0	0	22	4
Neftchi Fergana	2026	Uzbekistan Premier League	12	2	0	0	–		1 (Note: Appearance in Uzbekistan Super Cup)	0	13	2
Neftchi Fergana	Total		33	6	1	0	0	0	1	0	35	6
Career total			135	13	14	0	5	0	3	0	157	13

=== International ===
As of match played 17 June 2023

Uzbekistan
Year	Apps	Goals
2020	4	0
2021	8	1
2022	1	0
2023	3	0
Total	16	1

==== International goals ====
Scores and results list Uzbekistan's goal tally first.

No.	Date	Venue	Opponent	Score	Result	Competition
1.	9 October 2021	Amman International Stadium, Amman, Jordan	Malaysia	4–1	5–1	Friendly

== Honours ==
Pakhtakor

- Uzbekistan Super League: 2019
- Uzbekistan Cup: 2019
- Uzbekistan League Cup: 2019
- Uzbekistan Super Cup: 2021

Kairat

- Kazakhstan Premier League: 2024
