= Egor Krimets =

Uzbekistani footballer (born 1992)

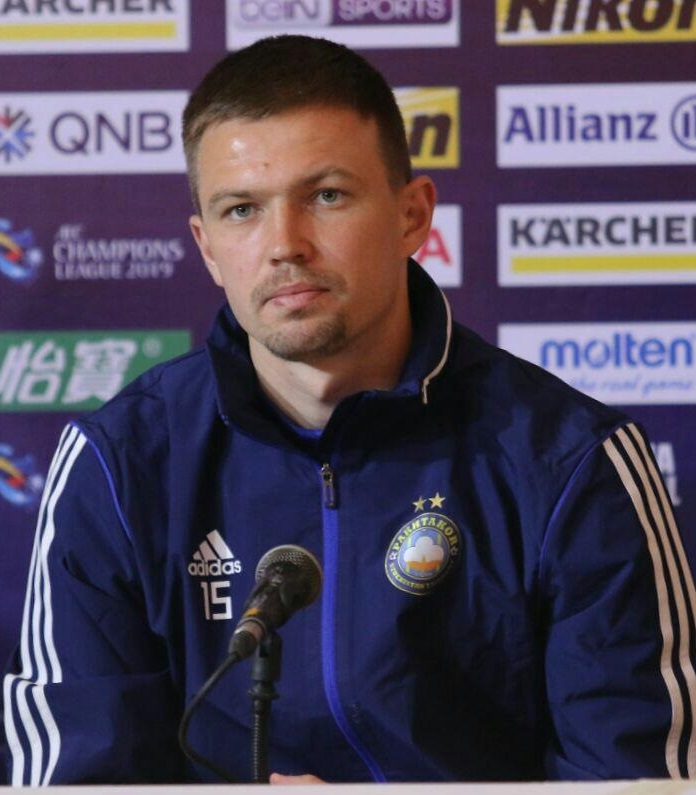

Personal information
- Full name: Egor Vladimirovich Krimets
- Date of birth: 27 January 1992 (age 34)
- Place of birth: Tashkent, Uzbekistan
- Height: 1.93 m (6 ft 4 in)
- Position: Defender

Team information
- Current team: Sogdiana

Senior career*
Years	Team	Apps	(Gls)
2010–2021	Pakhtakor	149	(15)
2013	→ Beijing Guoan (loan)	13	(0)
2016–2017	→ Beijing Guoan (loan)	33	(0)
2022–2023	Navbahor	0	(0)
2024	Surkhon	6	(0)
2025–	Sogdiana	0	(0)

International career^{‡}
2010	Uzbekistan U20	3	(0)
2012	Uzbekistan U23	1	(0)
2013–2020	Uzbekistan	40	(2)
- * Club domestic league appearances and goals as of 1 March 2025 ‡ National team caps and goals as of 23 February 2020

Egor Krimets (Uzbek: Егор Кримец or Yegor Krimets; Ukrainian: Єгор Крімець; born 27 January 1992) is an Uzbek former professional footballer who played as a defender for Sogdiana.

== Club career ==
Krimets started his professional career with Uzbek League giant Pakhtakor Tashkent in 2010. He moved to Chinese Super League side Beijing Guoan on a one-year loan deal on 25 January 2013. On 11 January 2016, Krimets was loaned to Beijing Guoan again for two years.

In 2021, Krimets signed a new one-year contract with Pakhtakor Tashkent.

== International career ==
In November 2012, Krimets was first called up to the Uzbekistan national team for a 2014 FIFA World Cup qualification match, in which Uzbekistan played against Iran. He was an unused substitute in this match.

== Career statistics ==
=== Club ===
As of match played 22 September 2024

Appearances and goals by club, season and competition
Club	Season	League			National cup		League cup		Continental		Other		Total	
Club	Season	Division	Apps	Goals	Apps	Goals	Apps	Goals	Apps	Goals	Apps	Goals	Apps	Goals
Pakhtakor Tashkent	2010	Uzbekistan Super League	0	0	1	0	–		0	0	–		1	0
Pakhtakor Tashkent	2011	Uzbekistan Super League	16	1	5	0	–		3	1	–		24	2
Pakhtakor Tashkent	2012	Uzbekistan Super League	23	3	5	0	–		4	0	–		32	3
Pakhtakor Tashkent	2014	Uzbekistan Super League	24	5	5	0	–		–		–		29	5
Pakhtakor Tashkent	2015	Uzbekistan Super League	28	3	5	0	–		5	0	1	0	39	3
Pakhtakor Tashkent	2018	Uzbekistan Super League	11	0	3	1	–		0	0	–		14	1
Pakhtakor Tashkent	2019	Uzbekistan Super League	21	3	4	0	2	0	7	1	–		34	4
Pakhtakor Tashkent	2020	Uzbekistan Super League	21	0	3	0	–		8	0	–		32	0
Pakhtakor Tashkent	2021	Uzbekistan Super League	5	0	0	0	–		4	0	1	0	10	0
Pakhtakor Tashkent	Total		149	15	31	1	2	0	31	2	2	0	215	18
Beijing Guoan (loan)	2013	Chinese Super League	13	0	3	0	–		2	0	–		18	0
Beijing Guoan (loan)	2016	Chinese Super League	28	0	3	1	–		–		–		31	1
Beijing Guoan (loan)	2017	Chinese Super League	5	0	0	0	–		–		–		5	0
Beijing Guoan (loan)	Total		33	0	3	1	0	0	2	0	0	0	38	1
Navbahor Namangan	2022	Uzbekistan Super League	0	0	0	0	–		–		–		0	0
Surkhon Termez	2024	Uzbekistan Super League	6	0	2	0	–		–		–		8	0
Career total			201	15	39	2	2	0	33	2	2	0	277	19

=== International ===
As of match played 23 February 2020

Appearances and goals by national team and year
National team	Year	Apps	Goals
Uzbekistan	2013	1	0
Uzbekistan	2014	8	0
Uzbekistan	2015	5	0
Uzbekistan	2016	9	2
Uzbekistan	2017	6	0
Uzbekistan	2018	4	0
Uzbekistan	2019	6	0
Uzbekistan	2020	1	0
Total		40	2

As of match played 6 September 2016
Scores and results list Uzbekistans's goal tally first, score column indicates score after each Krimets goal.

List of international goals scored by Egor Krimets
No.	Date	Venue	Opponent	Score	Result	Competition
1	24 August 2016	Bunyodkor Stadium, Tashkent, Uzbekistan	Burkina Faso	1–0	1–0	Friendly
2	6 September 2016	Jassim Bin Hamad Stadium, Doha, Qatar	Qatar	1–0	1–0	2018 FIFA World Cup qualification

== Honours ==
Pakhtakor

- Uzbek League: 2012, 2014, 2015, 2019, 2020
- Uzbekistan Cup: 2011, 2019
