= Sherzod Temirov =

Uzbekistani footballer

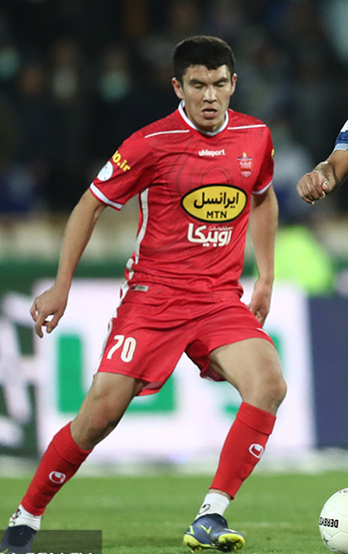
- Temirov in the 98' Tehran Derby

Personal information
- Full name: Sherzod Temirov
- Date of birth: 27 October 1998 (age 28)
- Place of birth: Guzar, Uzbekistan
- Height: 1.80 m (5 ft 11 in)
- Position: Striker

Team information
- Current team: Zakho

Youth career
- 2018–2019: Shurtan

Senior career*
Years	Team	Apps	(Gls)
2018–2019	Nasaf	8	(1)
2020	Mash'al	23	(1)
2021	Pakhtakor	18	(8)
2022	Persepolis	11	(1)
2022–2023	Paykan	23	(1)
2023–2025	Kitchee	36	(17)
2025–2026	Erbil	34	(28)
2026–	Zakho	0	(0)

International career^{‡}
2022–	Uzbekistan	2	(0)
Medal record
Men's football
Representing Uzbekistan
FIFA Series
Winner	2026 Uzbekistan
- * Club domestic league appearances and goals as of 11 June 2026 ‡ National team caps and goals as of 14 June 2022

Sherzod Temirov (Uzbek Cyrillic: Шерзод Темиров; born 27 October 1998) is an Uzbek professional footballer who plays as a striker and a left winger for Iraq Stars League club Zakho and the Uzbekistan national team.

== Club career ==
=== Persepolis ===
On 28 February 2022, Temirov signed an 18-month contract with Persian Gulf Pro League champions Persepolis.

=== Kitchee ===
On 22 November 2023, Temirov signed for Hong Kong Premier League club Kitchee.

== International career ==
Temirov made his international debut for the Uzbekistan in a 3–0 friendly win over South Sudan on 27 January 2022 (substituted Eldor Shomurodov in the 72nd minute).

== Career statistics ==
As of 8 December 2023

Club	Division	Season	League		Cup		Asia		Other		Total	
Club	Division	Season	Apps	Goals	Apps	Goals	Apps	Goals	Apps	Goals	Apps	Goals
Nasaf	Super League	2018	0	0	0	0	0	0	—		0	0
Nasaf	Super League	2019	8	1	0	0	—		—		8	1
Nasaf	Total		8	1	0	0	0	0	—		8	1
Mash'al	Super League	2020	23	1	2	2	—		—		25	3
Pakhtakor	Super League	2021	18	8	4	0	3	0	1	0	26	8
Persepolis	Pro League	2021–22	8	1	1	0	—		0	0	9	1
Persepolis	Pro League	2022–23	2	0	0	0	—		0	0	2	0
Persepolis	Total		10	1	1	0	—		0	0	11	1
Paykan	Pro League	2022–23	23	1	2	1	—		—		25	2
Kitchee	Premier League	2023–24	13	5	9	3	—		—		22	8
Kitchee	Premier League	2024–25	4	5	0	0	—		—		4	5
Kitchee	Total		17	10	9	3	0	0	—		26	13
Career Totals			99	22	18	6	3	0	1	0	121	238

== Honours ==
Pakhtakor

- Uzbekistan Super League (1): 2021
- Uzbekistan Cup (1): 2020
- Uzbekistan Super Cup (1): 2021

Kitchee

- Hong Kong Senior Challenge Shield (1): 2023–24
- HKPLC Cup (!): 2023–24

Uzbekistan

- FIFA Series : 2026

Individual

- Iraq Stars League top scorer: 2025–26
