= Marko Janković =

Marko Janković may refer to:

- Marko Janković (sprinter) (born 1976), Serbian Olympic sprinter
- Marko Janković (footballer, born 1995), Montenegrin football midfielder
- Marko Janković (journalist), Serbian journalist, disc jockey, politician, and radio and television presenter
