= Sharof Mukhiddinov =

Uzbekistani footballer

Sharof Mukhitdinov
- Mukhitdinov in 2025

Personal information
- Full name: Sharof Niyatkul o'gli Mukhitdinov
- Date of birth: 14 July 1997 (age 29)
- Place of birth: Jizzakh, Uzbekistan
- Position: Midfielder

Team information
- Current team: FC Nasaf
- Number: 14

Senior career*
| Years | Team | Apps | (Gls) |
| 2015–2020 | Nasaf | 96 | (13) |
| 2021 | Pakhtakor | 20 | (2) |
| 2022 | Nasaf | 22 | (2) |
| 2023 | Sanat Naft | 6 | (0) |
| 2023–2024 | Neftchi Fergana | 10 | (1) |
| 2024- | FC Nasaf | 64 | (10) |

International career^{‡}
| 2015–2016 | Uzbekistan U-19 | 6 | (0) |
| 2019–2020 | Uzbekistan U-23 | 7 | (1) |
| 2020– | Uzbekistan | 2 | (0) |
- * Club domestic league appearances and goals as of 29 July 2026 ‡ National team caps and goals as of 18:00, 10 July 2023 (UTC)

Sharof Mukhitdinov (Uzbek Cyrillic: Шароф Мухитдинов; born 14 July 1997) is an Uzbekistani footballer who plays as a midfielder for FC Nasaf.

== Career ==
Footballer of Nasaf Qarshi. Began his professional career with "Dragons" in 2015 and played until 2021. In pre-season 2021, he moved to FC Pakhtakor Tashkent. For "Lions", he became the champion of Uzbekistan, a Cup finalist and a Super Cup winner. Despite becoming one of the Pakhtakors' integral players, he returned again to Nasaf's lineup in 2022.

At the start of 2023 season, he signed a contract with Iranian Premier League club Sanat Naft. He played for the Iranian team for a half season. In the summer 2023, signed a contract with Neftchi Fergana.

He left the club after the expiration of his contract in 2024 and signed a contract on 6 February 2018 with his former team Nasaf Qarshi.
