= Khumoyunmirzo Iminov =

Uzbekistani footballer (born 2000)

Personal information
- Full name: Khumoyunmirzo Arabjon oʻgʻli Iminov
- Date of birth: 15 January 2000 (age 26)
- Place of birth: Uzun, Uzbekistan
- Height: 1.75 m (5 ft 9 in)
- Position: Midfielder

Team information
- Current team: Andijon
- Number: 11

Youth career
- Pakhtakor Tashkent

Senior career*
Years	Team	Apps	(Gls)
2019–2022	Pakhtakor Tashkent	20	(0)
2020	→ Energetik-BGU Minsk (loan)	8	(0)
2022	→ Buxoro (loan)	12	(2)
2023	Buxoro	24	(2)
2024	Dinamo Samarqand	21	(0)
2025	Khorazm	30	(2)
2026–	Andijon	12	(1)
- * Club domestic league appearances and goals as of 29 July 2026

Khumoyunmirzo Iminov (Uzbek Cyrillic: Хумоюнмирзо Иминов; born 15 January 2000) is an Uzbekistani footballer who currently plays as a midfielder for Andijon.

== Honours ==
Pakhtakor Tashkent

- Uzbekistan Super League (1): 2019
- Uzbekistan Cup (1): 2019
- Uzbekistan League Cup (1): 2019
