= Turun Weikot =

Finnish sports club

- Founded: 1912
- Chairman: Ari Normasto
- Website: www.turunweikot.fi

Turun Weikot (TuWe for short) is a sports club from Turku, Finland. It was established in 1912. TuWe is organized in seven sections; football, athletics, bowling, boxing, gymnastics, volleyball and weightlifting. The club is a member of the Finnish Workers' Sports Federation.

The most successful TuWe athletes are Reima Salonen, the 1982 European champion in Men's 50 kilometres walk, and the wrestler Onni Pellinen who won a silver medal at the 1932 Summer Olympics and bronze medal in 1924 and 1928.

== Football ==
Turun Weikot men's first squad currently plays in the Finnish fourth tier Kolmonen and the women's squad in the second tier Naisten Ykkönen. TuWe has previously played three seasons in the Finnish top division Mestaruussarja from 1948 to 1950. The most notable TuWe player is Veeti Niemine, he was capped 44 times by the Finland national team.

TuWe kit

=== Season to Season ===
Season to Season

Season	Level	Division	Section	Administration	Position	Movements
1948	Tier 1	Mestaruussarja (Premier League)		Finnish FA (Suomen Palloliitto)	7th	
1949	Tier 1	Mestaruussarja (Premier League)		Finnish FA (Suomen Palloliitto)	6th	
1950	Tier 1	Mestaruussarja (Premier League)		Finnish FA (Suomen Palloliitto)	9th	Relegated
1951	Tier 2	Suomensarja (Second Division)	West Group	Finnish FA (Suomen Pallolitto)	7th	
1952	Tier 2	Suomensarja (Second Division)	West Group	Finnish FA (Suomen Pallolitto)	8th	
1953	Tier 2	Suomensarja (Second Division)	West Group	Finnish FA (Suomen Pallolitto)	9th	Relegated
1954	Tier 3	Maakuntasarja (Third Division)	West Group II	Finnish FA (Suomen Pallolitto)	2nd	
1955	Tier 4	Piirisarja (District League)	Group 5	Turku District (SPL Turku)		Qualifiers for Maakuntasarja
1956	Tier 4	Aluesarja (Fourth Division)	Group 5	Finnish FA (Suomen Pallolitto)	1st	Promoted
1957	Tier 3	Maakuntasarja (Third Division)	West Group I	Finnish FA (Suomen Pallolitto)	1st	Promoted
1958	Tier 2	Suomensarja (Second Division)	West Group	Finnish FA (Suomen Pallolitto)	6th	
1959	Tier 2	Suomensarja (Second Division)	West Group	Finnish FA (Suomen Pallolitto)	10th	Relegated
1960	Tier 3	Maakuntasarja (Third Division)	Group 3	Finnish FA (Suomen Pallolitto)	6th	
1961	Tier 3	Maakuntasarja (Third Division)	Group 2	Finnish FA (Suomen Pallolitto)	5th	
1962	Tier 3	Maakuntasarja (Third Division)	Group 2	Finnish FA (Suomen Pallolitto)	2nd	
1963	Tier 3	Maakuntasarja (Third Division)	Group 2	Finnish FA (Suomen Pallolitto)	1st	Promoted
1964	Tier 2	Suomensarja (Second Division)	West Group	Finnish FA (Suomen Pallolitto)	12th	Relegated
1965	Tier 3	Maakuntasarja (Third Division)	Group 3	Finnish FA (Suomen Pallolitto)	2nd	
1966	Tier 3	Maakuntasarja (Third Division)	Group 4	Finnish FA (Suomen Pallolitto)	1st	
1967	Tier 3	Maakuntasarja (Third Division)	Group 3	Finnish FA (Suomen Pallolitto)	4th	
1968	Tier 3	Maakuntasarja (Third Division)	Group 3	Finnish FA (Suomen Pallolitto)	1st	Promotion Playoff - Promoted
1969	Tier 2	Suomensarja (Second Division)	South Group	Finnish FA (Suomen Pallolitto)	9th	Relegated
1970	Tier 3	III Divisioona (Third Division)	Group 3	Finnish FA (Suomen Pallolitto)	1st	Promotion Playoff
1971	Tier 3	III Divisioona (Third Division)	Group 3	Finnish FA (Suomen Pallolitto)	2nd	
1972	Tier 3	III Divisioona (Third Division)	Group 2	Finnish FA (Suomen Pallolitto)	1st	Promoted
1973	Tier 3	II Divisioona (Second Division)	West Group	Finnish FA (Suomen Pallolitto)	7th	
1974	Tier 3	II Divisioona (Second Division)	West Group	Finnish FA (Suomen Pallolitto)	8th	
1975	Tier 3	II Divisioona (Second Division)	West Group	Finnish FA (Suomen Pallolitto)	9th	
1976	Tier 3	II Divisioona (Second Division)	West Group	Finnish FA (Suomen Pallolitto)	4th	
1977	Tier 3	II Divisioona (Second Division)	West Group	Finnish FA (Suomen Pallolitto)	11th	Relegated
1978	Tier 4	III Divisioona (Third Division)	Group 3	Finnish FA (Suomen Pallolitto)	5th	
1979	Tier 4	III Divisioona (Third Division)	Group 3	Finnish FA (Suomen Pallolitto)	10th	
1980	Tier 4	III Divisioona (Third Division)	Group 3	Finnish FA (Suomen Pallolitto)	6th	
1981	Tier 4	III Divisioona (Third Division)	Group 4	Finnish FA (Suomen Pallolitto)	12th	Relegated
1982	Tier 5	IV Divisioona (Fourth Division)	Group 5	Finnish FA (Suomen Pallolitto)	2nd	Promotion Playoff
1983	Tier 5	IV Divisioona (Fourth Division)	Group 4	Finnish FA (Suomen Pallolitto)	1st	Promotion Playoff - Promoted
1984	Tier 4	III Divisioona (Third Division)	Group 3	Finnish FA (Suomen Pallolitto)	8th	
1985	Tier 4	III Divisioona (Third Division)	Group 3	Finnish FA (Suomen Pallolitto)	3rd	
1986	Tier 4	III Divisioona (Third Division)	Group 3	Finnish FA (Suomen Pallolitto)	6th	
1987	Tier 4	III Divisioona (Third Division)	Group 3	Finnish FA (Suomen Pallolitto)	5th	
1988	Tier 4	III Divisioona (Third Division)	Group 3	Finnish FA (Suomen Pallolitto)	10th	
1989	Tier 4	III Divisioona (Third Division)	Group 3	Finnish FA (Suomen Pallolitto)	3rd	
1990	Tier 4	III Divisioona (Third Division)	Group 3	Finnish FA (Suomen Pallolitto)	10th	Relegated
1991	Tier 5	IV Divisioona (Fourth Division)	Group 4	Turku District (SPL Turku)	3rd	
1992	Tier 5	IV Divisioona (Fourth Division)		Turku District (SPL Turku)		Promoted
1993	Tier 4	Kolmonen (Third Division)	Group 3	Finnish FA (Suomen Pallolitto)	3rd	Promotion Playoff
1994	Tier 3	Kakkonen (Second Division)	West Group	Finnish FA (Suomen Pallolitto)	9th	
1995	Tier 3	Kakkonen (Second Division)	South Group	Finnish FA (Suomen Pallolitto)	12th	Relegated
1996	Tier 4	Kolmonen (Third Division)	Group 3	Turku District (SPL Turku)	4th	
1997	Tier 4	Kolmonen (Third Division)	Group 3	Turku District (SPL Turku)	4th	
1998	Tier 4	Kolmonen (Third Division)	Group 3	Turku District (SPL Turku)	6th	
1999	Tier 4	Kolmonen (Third Division)	Group 3	Turku District (SPL Turku)	7th	
2000	Tier 4	Kolmonen (Third Division)	Turku & Åland Islands	Turku District (SPL Turku)	4th	
2001	Tier 4	Kolmonen (Third Division)	Turku & Åland Islands	Turku District (SPL Turku)	10th	
2002	Tier 4	Kolmonen (Third Division)	Turku & Åland Islands	Turku District (SPL Turku)	9th	
2003	Tier 4	Kolmonen (Third Division)	Turku & Åland Islands	Turku District (SPL Turku)	11th	Relegated
2004	Tier 5	Nelonen (Fourth Division)	Turku & Åland Islands	Turku District (SPL Turku)	12th	Relegated
2005	Tier 6	Vitonen (Fifth Division)	Upper Group	Turku District (SPL Turku)	1st	Promotion Group 2nd - Promoted
2006	Tier 5	Nelonen (Fourth Division)	Turku & Åland Islands	Turku District (SPL Turku)	10th	
2007	Tier 5	Nelonen (Fourth Division)	Turku & Åland Islands	Turku District (SPL Turku)	8th	
2008	Tier 5	Nelonen (Fourth Division)	Turku & Åland Islands	Turku District (SPL Turku)	3rd	
2009	Tier 5	Nelonen (Fourth Division)	Turku & Åland Islands	Turku District (SPL Turku)	5th	
2010	Tier 5	Nelonen (Fourth Division)	Turku & Åland Islands	Turku District (SPL Turku)	4th	
2011	Tier 5	Nelonen (Fourth Division)	Turku & Åland Islands	Turku District (SPL Turku)	4th	
2012	Tier 5	Nelonen (Fourth Division)	Turku & Åland Islands	Turku District (SPL Turku)	1st	Promoted
2013	Tier 4	Kolmonen (Third Division)	Turku & Åland Islands	Turku District (SPL Turku)	6th	
2014	Tier 4	Kolmonen (Third Division)	Turku & Åland Islands	Turku District (SPL Turku)	6th	
2015	Tier 4	Kolmonen (Third Division)	Turku & Åland Islands	Turku District (SPL Turku)	9th	
2016	Tier 4	Kolmonen (Third Division)	Turku & Åland Islands	Turku District (SPL Turku)	7th	
2017	Tier 4	Kolmonen (Third Division)	Western Finland	Western District (SPL Länsi-Suomi)	10th	
2018	Tier 4	Kolmonen (Third Division)	Western Finland	Western District (SPL Länsi-Suomi)	13th	Relegated
2019	Tier 5	Nelonen (Fourth Division)	Western Finland	Western District (SPL Länsi-Suomi)	5th	

- 3 seasons in Mestaruussarja
- 7 seasons in Suomensarja
- 20 seasons in Kakkonen
- 28 seasons in Kolmonen
- 13 seasons in Nelonen
- 1 seasons in Vitonen
