= Farrukh Sayfiev =

Uzbek footballer (born 1991)

Farrukh Sayfiyev
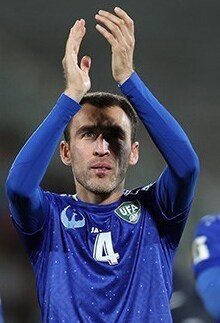
- Sayfiyev with Uzbekistan in 2025

Personal information
- Full name: Farrux Karimovich Sayfiyev
- Date of birth: 17 January 1991 (age 35)
- Place of birth: Samarkand, Uzbek SSR, Soviet Union
- Height: 1.80 m (5 ft 11 in)
- Position: Left-back

Team information
- Current team: Neftchi Fergana
- Number: 34

Youth career
- 2011–2012: Nasaf-2

Senior career*
Years	Team	Apps	(Gls)
2012–2018	Nasaf	111	(13)
2018–2024	Pakhtakor	195	(11)
2024	Navbahor Namangan	22	(1)
2025–	Neftchi Fergana	31	(1)

International career^{‡}
2014–	Uzbekistan	46	(1)
Medal record
Representing Uzbekistan
CAFA Nations Cup
Runner-up	2023 Kyrgyzstan–Uzbekistan	Team
Winner	2025 Tajikistan–Uzbekistan	Team
- * Club domestic league appearances and goals as of 20:25, 28 July 2026 (UTC) ‡ National team caps and goals as of 19 June 2026

Farrukh Karimovich Sayfiyev (Uzbek: Farrux Sayfiyev, Фаррух Сайфиев; born 17 January 1991) is an Uzbek professional footballer who plays as a left-back for Neftchi Fergana and the Uzbekistan national team.

== Career ==
On January 5, 2025, a member of the Uzbekistan Super League, he signed a contract with the Fergana club Neftchi.

=== International ===
Sayfiev made his debut for the Uzbekistan main team on 20 August 2014 in a Friendly match against Azerbaijan.

Uzbekistan national team
Year	Apps	Goals
2014	9	0
2015	4	0
2016	0	0
2017	1	0
2018	1	0
2019	10	0
2020	2	0
2021	5	0
2022	8	1
2023	2	0
Total	42	1

Statistics accurate as of match played 20 June 2023.

=== International goals ===
Scores and results list Uzbekistan's goal tally first.

No.	Date	Venue	Opponent	Score	Result	Competition
1.	8 June 2022	Markaziy Stadium, Namangan, Uzbekistan	Sri Lanka	2–0	3–0	2023 AFC Asian Cup qualification
