= Abror Ismoilov =

Uzbek footballer (born 1998)

Personal information
- Date of birth: 8 January 1998 (age 28)
- Place of birth: Yozyovon, Fergana Region, Uzbekistan
- Position: Midfielder

Team information
- Current team: Neftchi Fergana
- Number: 7

Senior career*
Years	Team	Apps	(Gls)
2016–2018	Neftchi	35	(5)
2019	Surkhon Termez	23	(2)
2020–2021	Pakhtakor	41	(2)
2022	Neftchi	22	(5)
2023–2024	Navbahor Namangan	45	(3)
2025–	Neftchi Fergana	40	(5)

International career^{‡}
2018	Uzbekistan U19	6	(1)
2019–2020	Uzbekistan U23	8	(0)
2019–	Uzbekistan	12	(0)
- * Club domestic league appearances and goals as of 20:15, 28 July 2026 (UTC) ‡ National team caps and goals as of 5 September 2021

Abror Ismoilov (Uzbek Cyrillic: Aброрбек Исмоилов; born 8 January 1998) is an Uzbek professional footballer who currently plays as a midfielder for Neftchi Fergana.

== Career ==
=== Club career ===
After two seasons with Navbahor, Ismailov left the club at the end of 2024. On 9 December 2024, he signed with Neftchi.

=== International ===
Ismoilov made his debut for the Uzbekistan main team on 9 November 2021 in a Friendly match against Kyrgyzstan.

Uzbekistan national team
Year	Apps	Goals
2019	1	0
2020	6	0
2021	2	0
2022	0	0
2023	0	0
Total	9	0

Statistics accurate as of match played 5 September 2023.
