= 2025 Uzbekistan Super League =

Uzbekistan Super League
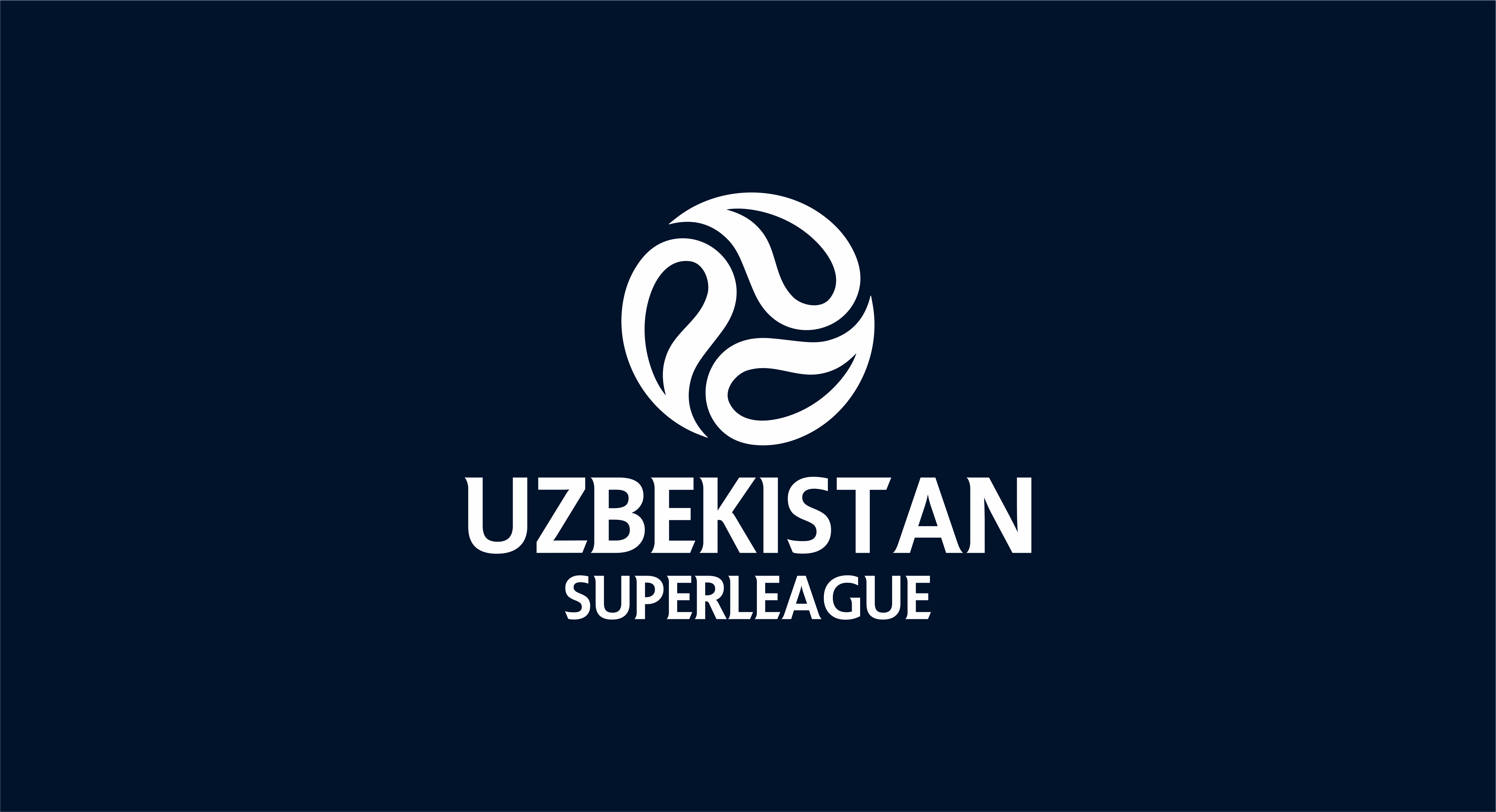
- Logo of Super League since 2024
- Season: 2025
- Dates: 7 March – 30 November 2025
- Champions: Neftchi (6th title)
- Relegated: Shurtan
- Champions League: Neftchi
- Champions League Two: Pakhtakor
- Matches: 240
- Goals: 609 (2.54 per match)
- Top goalscorer: Igor Sergeev (20 goals)
- Biggest home win: Pakhtakor 6–0 Bukhara (10 May 2025)
- Biggest away win: Andijon 2–6 Pakhtakor (22 August 2025)
- Highest scoring: Andijon 2–6 Pakhtakor (22 August 2025)
- Longest winning run: Neftchi and Navbahor
- Longest unbeaten run: Nasaf
- Longest winless run: Shurtan
- Longest losing run: Kokand 1912 (9 matches)
- Highest attendance: 22,000 – Neftchi vs Qizilqum (24 November 2025)
- Lowest attendance: 171 – Bukhara vs Mash'al (3 May 2025)
- All statistics correct as of 1 December 2025.

The 2025 Uzbekistan Super League (Uzbek: Футбол бўйича 2025–йилги Ўзбекистон Суперлигаси) was the 34rd season of top-level football in Uzbekistan since its establishment in 1992.

Nasaf were the defending champions, having won the 2024 campaign.

== Season events ==
The current season saw an expansion from 16 teams. At the end of the previous season, Lokomotiv, Metallurg and Olympic were relegated to the Uzbekistan Pro League. The newly-promoted teams from the 2024 Uzbekistan Pro League were Mash'al Mubarek, Shurtan Guzar, Kokand 1912, Khorazm and Bukhara.

The draw for the 2025 Uzbekistan Super League was made on 1 February.

In March, Uzbekistan Professional Football League established a partnership with Macron, bringing the number of league sponsors to six.

The date of the 12th round of the Super League schedule has been changed due to the international matches of the Uzbekistan national team to be held from 2 to 10 June.

On 7 August, Bunyodkor Stadium hosted a concert by singer Jennifer Lopez titled "Up All Night: Live in 2025". In connection with this, the match between Bunyodkor and Shurtan in the 17th round was moved to Jar stadium. After the program, the stadium's grass was seriously damaged. Given the 3–4 months it would take to restore the grass, the home matches of Bunyodkor were temporarily moved to Jar stadium. On 18 August, the newly built Olympic City Stadium was opened in Tashkent, and it was decided that FC Bunyodkor would play at this stadium until next season.

In the end-of-season play-offs, Kokand 1912, Bukhara, Khorezm and Mashal retained their places in the Super League. Shurtan was relegated to the Pro League. Lokomotiv returned to the Super League.

Uzbekistan
Andijon	Bunyodkor	Buxoro	Dinamo
Bobur Arena	Bunyodkor	Bukhara FA	Dinamo
Capacity: 18,500	Capacity: 34,000	Capacity: 10,000	Capacity: 11,650
Mashʼal	2025 Uzbekistan Super League is located in Uzbekistan		
Guzor Stadium	2025 Uzbekistan Super League is located in Uzbekistan		
Capacity: 7,000	2025 Uzbekistan Super League is located in Uzbekistan		
Nasaf	2025 Uzbekistan Super League is located in Uzbekistan		
Qarshi markaziy	2025 Uzbekistan Super League is located in Uzbekistan		
Capacity: 21,000	2025 Uzbekistan Super League is located in Uzbekistan		
Navbahor	Neftchi	OKMK	Paxtakor
Navbahor	Istiqlol	OKMK	Pakhtakor
Capacity: 22,000	Capacity: 20,000	Capacity: 12,000	Capacity: 35,000
Qizilqum	Kokand 1912	Soʻgʻdiyona	Surkhon
Yoshlar	Kokand	Sogdiana	Surkhon
Capacity: 12,500	Capacity: 10,500	Capacity: 11,650	Capacity: 10,600
No foto		No foto	
Shurtan	Xorazm	Bunyodkor (interim)	
G'uzor Stadium	Xorazm	Olympic	
Capacity: 7,000	Capacity: 13,500	Capacity: 12,000	

=== Managerial changes ===
Team	Outgoing manager	Manner of departure	Date of vacancy	Position in table	Replaced by	Date of appointment	Ref.
Pakhtakor	(Uzbekistan) Maksim Shatskikh	Resigned		Preseason	(Portugal) Pedro Moreira	4 December 2024	
Qizilqum	(Uzbekistan) Jamshid Saidov	Resigned		Preseason	(Serbia) Nikola Lazarević	26 December 2024	
Pakhtakor	(Uzbekistan) / (Ukraine) Maksim Shatskikh			Start of season	(Portugal) Pedro Moreira		
Andijan	(Russia) / (Uzbekistan) Aleksandr Khomyakov	Unsatisfactory results	4 May 2025	12th place	(Uzbekistan) / (Ukraine) Maksim Shatskikh		
Shurtan	(Uzbekistan) Anvar Berdiev	Unsatisfactory results	5 May 2025	16th place	(Uzbekistan) Eldor Moyliyev	Interim	
Qizilqum	(Serbia) Nikola Lazarevic	Unsatisfactory results	9 June 2025	13th place			

== Foreign players ==
Notes

- Clubs could register a total of six foreign players over the course of the season.
- Players in italics were out of the squad or left the club within the season, after the pre-season transfer window or in the mid-season transfer window, and at least had one appearance.
- Players name in **bold** indicates registration during the mid-season transfer window.

Club	Player 1	Player 2	Player 3	Player 4	Player 5	Player 6	Former players
AGMK	(Georgia (country)) Giorgi Papava	(Japan) Naoaki Senaga	(Japan) Arihiro Sentoku	(Spain) Rubén Sánchez	(South Sudan) Ajak Riak		(Albania) Klejdi Daci
Andijon	(Kosovo) Altin Kryeziu	(Kyrgyzstan) **Erzhan Tokotayev**	(Montenegro) Luka Uskoković	(Nigeria) **Ismahil Akinade**	(Poland) **Krystian Nowak**		(Russia) Islam Mashukov (Montenegro) Miomir Đuričković (Bosnia and Herzegovina) Mirzad Mehanović
Bukhara	(Bosnia and Herzegovina) Dominik Begić	(Croatia) Frane Čirjak	(Croatia) Frane Ikić	(Croatia) Josip Tomašević	(Georgia (country)) **Toma Tabatadze**	(Serbia) Marko Kolaković	
Bunyodkor	(Croatia) Martin Šroler	(Georgia (country)) Imeda Ashortia	(Georgia (country)) Nikoloz Mali	(Japan) Itsuki Urata	(Montenegro) Marko Bugarin	(Montenegro) **Matija Krivokapić**	(Albania) Luis Kaçorri
Dinamo	(Brazil) Jurani Ferreira	(Brazil) Maykon Douglas	(Nigeria) Richard Friday	(Russia) **Dmitry Pletnyov**	(Serbia) Marko Stanojević	(Ukraine) Oleksandr Kucherenko	(Tajikistan) Manuchekhr Safarov
Kokand 1912	(Albania) **Klejdi Daci**	(Georgia (country)) Andro Giorgadze	(Georgia (country)) Shota Gvazava	(Ukraine) Yehor Kondratyuk			(Ivory Coast) Kobena Amed
Khorazm	(Russia) **Artyom Potapov**	(Serbia) Vladimir Bubanja	(Tajikistan) Shahrom Samiev				(Ghana) Francis Narh
Mash'al	(Nigeria) **Aminu Umar**	(Russia) **Dmitri Yashin**					(Ghana) Salifu Mudasiru
Nasaf	(Kosovo) **Adenis Shala**	(Nigeria) **Yusuf Otubanjo**	(Nigeria) **Kingsley Sokari**	(Serbia) Dragan Ćeran	(Serbia) Stefan Čolović	(Ukraine) Oleksandr Vorobey	(Albania) Rubin Hebaj
Navbahor	(Brazil) Guilherme Guedes	(Brazil) Higor Gabriel	(Brazil) Pedro	(Brazil) **Júlio César**	(Nigeria) Benjamin Teidi		(Belarus) Sergey Karpovich
Neftchi	(Kyrgyzstan) **Joel Kojo**	(Liberia) **Sylvanus Nimely**	(Montenegro) Vladimir Jovović	(Serbia) Bojan Ciger	(Serbia) Jovan Đokić	(Serbia) Zoran Marušić	(Georgia (country)) Toma Tabatadze
Pakhtakor	(Brazil) Flamarion	(Brazil) Jhonatan	(Colombia) Brayan Riascos	(Iraq) Bashar Resan	(Iraq) **Zaid Tahseen**		(Brazil) Jonatan Lucca
Qizilqum	(Georgia (country)) Jaba Jighauri	(Montenegro) Nikola Kumburović	(Serbia) Dušan Mijić	(Ukraine) Roman Paparyha			(Serbia) Alen Mašović (Georgia (country)) Elguja Lobjanidze
Shurtan							(Tajikistan) Daler Sharipov
Sogdiana	(Albania) **Rubin Hebaj**	(North Macedonia) Ljupcho Doriev	(Serbia) Milan Mitrović	(Serbia) **Filip Ivanović**	(Tajikistan) Zoir Dzhuraboyev		(Nigeria) John Junior Igbarumah (Tajikistan) Ehson Panjshanbe (Montenegro) Luka Đorđević
Surkhon	(Russia) Dzhamaldin Khodzhaniyazov						(Russia) Dmitry Pletnyov (Russia) Kirill Kolesnichenko (Russia) Dmitriy Kratkov (Russia) Artyom Potapov

== League table ==
Pos	Team	Pld	W	D	L	GF	GA	GD	Pts	Qualification or relegation
1	Neftchi (C)	30	19	7	4	49	24	+25	64	Qualification for AFC Champions League Elite league stage
2	Pakhtakor	30	18	6	6	59	23	+36	60	Qualification for AFC Champions League Elite preliminary stage (Note: As Uzbekistan Cup winners)
3	Nasaf	30	16	11	3	51	23	+28	59	Qualification for AFC Champions League Two group stage
4	Dinamo	30	16	10	4	47	30	+17	58	Qualification for Silk Way Cup group stage
5	Bunyodkor	30	13	10	7	48	40	+8	49	
6	AGMK	30	14	6	10	44	34	+10	48	
7	Navbahor	30	10	10	10	41	37	+4	40	
8	Sogdiana	30	10	7	13	37	37	0	37	
9	Qizilqum	30	9	9	12	28	44	−16	36	
10	Surkhon	30	9	8	13	26	30	−4	35	
11	Andijon	30	9	8	13	39	51	−12	35	
12	Kokand 1912 (O)	30	9	7	14	24	39	−15	34	Relegation play off Uzbekistan Pro League
13	Mash'al (O)	30	8	6	16	22	48	−26	30	Relegation play off Uzbekistan Pro League
14	Khorazm	30	7	6	17	33	39	−6	27	Relegation play off Uzbekistan Pro League
15	Bukhara	30	6	9	15	30	49	−19	27	Relegation play off Uzbekistan Pro League
16	Shurtan (R)	30	3	8	19	27	57	−30	17	Relegation to Uzbekistan Pro League

Source: Uzbekistan Professional Football League
Rules for classification: 1) points; 2) head-to-head points; 3) head-to-head goal difference; 4) head-to-head away goals scored; 5) goal difference; 6) number of goals scored.
(C) Champions; (O) Play-off winners; (R) Relegated

=== Round 1 ===
7 March 2025	AGMK	2–1	Bukhara	Olmaliq
19.30 UZT (UTC+5)	Gʻiyosov 11'; Abdurahmonov 90'	Report	Joʻrayev 18'	Stadium: AGMK Stadium; Attendance: 2017; Referee: Gʻayrat Joʻrayev (Oʻzbekiston)

8 March 2025	Qizilqum	2–0	Surkhon	Samarqand
17.45 UZT (UTC+5)	Papariga 9'; Lobjanidze 90+4'	Report		Stadium: Dinamo; Attendance: 385; Referee: Toʻrabek Suyunov

8 March 2025	Khorazm	2–0	Shurtan	Gʻuzor
17.30 UZT (UTC+5)	Abduhamidov 39'; Bobojonov 90+6'	Report		Stadium: Gʻuzor; Attendance: 6000; Referee: Olim Toʻychboyev

8 March 2025	Bunyodkor	2–2	Neftchi	Toshkent
20.00 UZT (UTC+5)	Normurodov 8'; Marušić 15'	Report	Yoʻldoshev 46'; Urata 73'	Stadium: Milliy Stadium; Attendance: 3200; Referee: Temur Toʻxtasinov

9 March 2025	Kokand 1912	1–1	Andijon	Qoʻqon
17.30 UZT (UTC+5)	Giorgadze 43'	Report	Turdimurodov 39'	Stadium: Qoʻqon; Attendance: 343; Referee: Dostonbek Rahmonov

10 March 2025	Nasaf	1–0	Sogdiana	Qarshi
20.00 UZT (UTC+5)	Muhiddinov 36'	Report		Stadium: Qarshi; Attendance: 6822; Referee: Ravshan Abduvohidov

10 March 2025	Navbahor	0–0	Dinamo	Namangan
19.30 UZT (UTC+5)		Report		Stadium: Navbahor; Attendance: 6250; Referee: Ravshan Abduvohidov

2 April 2025	Pakhtakor	5–0	Mash'al	Toshkent
UZT (UTC+5)	Sergeev 13'; Flamarion 45'; Sergeev 45+5'; Joʻraqoʻziyev 58'; Rahmatullayev 75'	Report		Stadium: Jar; Attendance: 4001

=== Round 2 ===
14 March 2025	Bukhara	2–0	Qizilqum	Toshkent
19.30 UZT (UTC+5)	Roʻziyev 9'; Xayrullayev 85'	Report		Stadium: Jar stadioni Attendance: 1011; Referee: Doston Rahmonov

14 March 2025	Neftchi	0–0	Kokand 1912	Fargʻona
19.30 UZT (UTC+5)		Report		Stadium: Istiqlol; Attendance: 10250; Referee: Ilgiz Tantashev

15 March 2025	Shurtan	0–2	Bunyodkor	Qarshi
17.55 UZT (UTC+5)		Report	Kaçorri 23'; Kaçorri 58'	Stadium: Markaziy; Attendance: 543; Referee: Ibrohim Ismoilov

15 March 2025	Andijon	1–1	Nasaf	Andijon
19.30 UZT (UTC+5)	Zoteyev 15'	Report	Nurulloyev 28'	Stadium: Bobur Arena; Attendance: 17000; Referee: Rustam Lutfullin

15 March 2025	Dinamo	1–0	Mash'al	Samarqand
20.15 UZT (UTC+5)	Mirahmadov 45'	Report		Stadium: Dinamo; Attendance: 8150; Referee: Nikita Mustafin

16 March 2025	Surkhon	0–2	Khorazm	Termiz
17.45 UZT (UTC+5)		Report	Iminov 11'; Abdullajonov 32'	Stadium: Surxon arena Attendance: 6784; Referee: Ravshan Abduvohidov

16 March 2025	Sogdiana	2–3	Navbahor	Jizzax
19.30 UZT (UTC+5)	Doriyev 14'; Doriyev 76'	Report	Xoldorxonov 2'; Jiyanov 66'; Augusto 90'	Stadium: Soʻgʻdiyona markaziy Attendance: 4506; Referee: Ahrol Risqullayev

16 March 2025	Pakhtakor	0–2	AGMK	Olmaliq
20.00 UZT (UTC+5)		Report	Abdurazzoqov 17'; Abdurahmonov 88'	Stadium: OKMK; Attendance: 4812; Referee: Asker Najafaliyev

=== Round 3 ===
27 March 2025	Bukhara	1–4	Khorazm	Toshkent
16.45 UZT (UTC+5)	Abduhamidov 47'	Report	Norxonov 11'; Norxonov 51'; Begic 63'; Tupliyev 90+8'	Stadium: Doʻstlik; Attendance: 852; Referee: Toʻrabek Suyunov

27 March 2025	Kokand 1912	0–0	Shurtan	Qoʻqon
19.30 UZT (UTC+5)		Report		Stadium: Qoʻqon markaziy Attendance: 4005; Referee: Temur Toʻxtasinov

28 March 2025	Qizilqum	1–3	AGMK	Samarqand
16.45 UZT (UTC+5)	Lobjanidze 40'	Report	Toʻxtaxoʻjayev 12'; Gʻiyosov 31'; Papava 51'; Abdurazzoqov 75'	Stadium: Dinamo; Attendance: 450; Referee: Shavkat Nasibullayev

28 March 2025	Navbahor	2–2	Andijon	Namangan
19.30 UZT (UTC+5)	Oʻrinboyev 2'; Guedes 52'	Report	Gʻulomov 6'; Teidi 90+8'	Stadium: Navbahor; Attendance: 15420; Referee: Ilgiz Tantashev

28 March 2025	Bunyodkor	3–1	Surkhon	Toshkent
20.00 UZT (UTC+5)	Kaçorri 43'; Ashortia 74'; Kaçorri 90'	Report	Abdurahmonov 90+6'	Stadium: Milliy Stadium; Attendance: 1210; Referee: Olim Toʻychiboyev

29 March 2025	Nasaf	0–0	Neftchi	Qarshi
18.30 UZT (UTC+5)		Report		Stadium: Qarshi markaziy Attendance: 4653; Referee: Ahrol Risqullayev

29 March 2025	Mash'al	1–0	Sogdiana	Jizzax
20.00 UZT (UTC+5)	Baratov 45+4'	Report		Stadium: Soʻgʻdiyona; Attendance: 997; Referee: Rustam Lutfullin

29 March 2025	Pakhtakor	0–1	Dinamo	Toshkent
20.30 UZT (UTC+5)		Report	Hojimirzayev 61'	Stadium: Jar; Attendance: 3500; Referee: Gʻayrat Joʻrayev

=== Round 4 ===
4 April 2025	Bukhara	0–2	Bunyodkor	Toshkent
UZT (UTC+5)		Report	Ikic 78'; Yoʻldoshev 87'	Stadium: Milliy Stadium; Attendance: 841; Referee: Nayim Qosimov

4 April 2025	Surkhon	3–1	Kokand 1912	Termiz
UZT (UTC+5)	Abdurahmonov 37'; Ramazonov 90+3'; Karimov 90+7'	Report	Hasanov 90+7'	Stadium: Surxon arena Attendance: 6154; Referee: Nikita Mustafin

5 April 2025	Neftchi	3–2	Navbahor	Fargʻona
UZT (UTC+5)	Toshmirzayev 48'; Marušić 64'; Marušić 72'	Report	Ahmedov 30'; Jiyanov 49'	Stadium: Istiqlol; Attendance: 14552; Referee: Rustam Lutfullin

5 April 2025	Shurtan	1–4	Nasaf	Qarshi
UZT (UTC+5)	Qoʻziyev 80'	Report	Norchayev 5'; Bozorov 26'; Muhiddinov 70'; Muhiddinov 86'	Stadium: Markaziy; Attendance: 3454; Referee: Asker Najafaliyev

6 April 2025	Andijon	1–0	Mash'al	Andijon
UZT (UTC+5)	Abdugʻaniyev 7'	Report		Stadium: Bobur; Attendance: 11200; Referee: Ibrohim Ismoilov

6 April 2025	Sogdiana	2–0	Pakhtakor	Jizzax
UZT (UTC+5)	Doriyev 46'; Đorđević 52'	Report		Stadium: Soʻgʻdiyona markaziy Attendance: 2850; Referee: Ilgiz Tantashev

6 April 2025	AGMK	0–0	Dinamo	Olmaliq
UZT (UTC+5)		Report		Stadium: AGMK Stadium; Attendance: 3815

6 June 2025	Qizilqum	0–3	Khorazm	Navoiy
UZT (UTC+5)		Report	Iminov 11'; Bobojonov 41'; Tursunqulov 90+2'	Stadium: Yoshlar; Referee: Nikita Mustafin

=== Round 5 ===
13 April 2025	Mash'al	1–4	Neftchi	Olmaliq
UZT (UTC+5)	Abduraimov 45+4'	Report	Toshmirzayev 7'; Iskanderov 44'; Đokić 58'; Gʻofurov 90'	Stadium: AGMK Stadium; Referee: Ibrohim Ismoilov

12 April 2025	Navbahor	2–0	Shurtan	Namangan
UZT (UTC+5)	Gabriel 45+3'; Abbos Gʻulomov 90+6'	Report		Stadium: Markaziy

12 April 2025	Kokand 1912	1–0	Bukhara	Qoʻqon
UZT (UTC+5)	Malikjonov 35'	Report		Stadium: Markaziy; Referee: Ahrol Risqullayev

13 April 2025	Dinamo	1–1	Sogdiana	Samarqand
UZT (UTC+5)	Jurani 26'	Report	Qahramonov 40'	Stadium: Dinamo; Referee: Doston Rahmonov

11 April 2025	Bunyodkor	0–0	Qizilqum	Toshkent
UZT (UTC+5)		Report		Stadium: Milliy Stadium; Referee: Rustam Lutfullin

11 April 2025	Khorazm	0–1	AGMK	Olmaliq
UZT (UTC+5)		Report	Joʻrayev 36'	Stadium: AGMK Stadium; Referee: [[]] ([[]])

13 April 2025	Pakhtakor	2–3	Andijon	Toshkent
UZT (UTC+5)	Sergeev 67'; Resan 84'	Report	Abdumannopov 54'; Turdimurodov 60'; Uskoković 80'	Stadium: Jar; Referee: Nayim Qosimov

12 April 2025	Nasaf	1–0	Surkhon	Qarshi
UZT (UTC+5)	Ceran 41'	Report		Stadium: Qarshi; Referee: Gʻayrat Joʻrayev

=== Round 6 ===
21 April 2025	Khorazm	0–0	Bunyodkor	Toshkent
UZT (UTC+5)		Report		Stadium: Milliy Stadium; Referee: Nikita Mustafin

20 April 2025	Qizilqum	1–0	Kokand 1912	Samarqand
UZT (UTC+5)	Mašović 56'	Report		Stadium: Dinamo; Referee: Asker Najafaliyev

18 April 2025	Shurtan	0–1	Mash'al	Qarshi
UZT (UTC+5)		Report	Abduraimov 77'	Stadium: Markaziy; Referee: Toʻrabek Suyunov

20 April 2025	Bukhara	1–3	Nasaf	Toshkent
UZT (UTC+5)	Kulmatov 90+6'	Report	Golban 54'; Čolović 85'; Rahmatov 88'	Stadium: Jar; Referee: Akobirxoʻja Shukrullayev

19 April 2025	Neftchi	0–4	Pakhtakor	Fargʻona
UZT (UTC+5)		Report	Adhamzoda 22'; Riascos 42'; Sergeev 45+1'; Adhamzoda 45+6'	Stadium: Istiqlol; Referee: Temurbek Toʻxtasinov

19 April 2025	Andijon	1–2	Dinamo	Andijon
UZT (UTC+5)	Uskoković 81'	Report	Abdullayev 66'; Abdurahmonov 81'	Stadium: Bobur Arena; Referee: Shavkat Nasibullayev

20 April 2025	AGMK	3–2	Sogdiana	Olmaliq
UZT (UTC+5)	Abdurahmonov 52'; Gʻiyosov 72'; Gʻiyosov 84'	Report	Doriyev 47'; Doriyev 57'	Stadium: OKMK; Referee: Gʻayrat Joʻrayev

20 April 2025	Surkhon	1–0	Navbahor	Termiz
UZT (UTC+5)	Kolesnichenko 87'	Report		Stadium: Surxon; Referee: Nayim Qosimov

=== Round 7 ===
26 April 2025	Kokand 1912	1–0	Khorazm	Jizzax
UZT (UTC+5)	Beshimov 44'	Report		Stadium: Soʻgʻdiyona; Referee: Firdavs Norsafarov

26 April 2025	Mash'al	0–0	Surkhon	Termiz
UZT (UTC+5)		Report		Stadium: Surxon; Referee: Shavkat Nasibullayev

26 April 2025	Sogdiana	1–0	Andijon	Jizzax
UZT (UTC+5)	Izzatov 59'	Report		Stadium: Soʻgʻdiyona; Referee: Asker Najafaliyev

27 April 2025	Pakhtakor	1–0	Shurtan	Toshkent
UZT (UTC+5)	Sergeev 4'	Report		Stadium: Jar; Referee: Olim Toʻychiboyev

27 April 2025	Navbahor	3–0	Bukhara	Namangan
UZT (UTC+5)	Gʻulomov 15'; Mirsaidov 62'; Guedes 62'	Report		Stadium: Navbahor; Referee: Toʻrabek Suyunov

27 April 2025	Nasaf	4–0	Qizilqum	Qarshi
UZT (UTC+5)	Rahmatov 46'; Norchayev 53'; Bozorov 67'; Hebaj 79'	Report		Stadium: Markaziy; Referee: Rustam Choriyev

28 April 2025	Bunyodkor	1–0	AGMK	Toshkent
UZT (UTC+5)	Abduxoliqov 25'	Report		Stadium: Milliy Stadium; Referee: Temurbek Toʻxtasinov

July 2, 2025	Dinamo	0–2	Neftchi	Samarqand
UZT (UTC+5)		Report	Yoʻldoshev 24'; Ismoilov 78'	Stadium: Dinamo; Referee: Firdavs Norsafarov

=== Round 8 ===
2 May 2025	Khorazm	1–1	Nasaf	Jizzax
UZT (UTC+5)	Xusinov 75'	Report	Davronov 12'	Stadium: Soʻgʻdiyona; Attendance: 864; Referee: Abdurashid Xudoyberganov

2 May 2025	Bunyodkor	1–2	Kokand 1912	Toshkent
UZT (UTC+5)	Abduxoliqov 16'	Report	Xoltoʻrayev 84'; Husanov 90+6'	Stadium: Milliy Stadium; Referee: Gʻayrat Joʻrayev

3 May 2025	Bukhara	1–2	Mash'al	Toshkent
UZT (UTC+5)	Norxonov 55'	Report	Baratov 53'; Murtozoyev 90'	Stadium: Jar

3 May 2025	AGMK	4–3	Andijon	Olmaliq
UZT (UTC+5)	Gʻiyosov 16'; Gʻiyosov 87'; Rustamov 90+3'; Gʻiyosov 90+7'	Report	Abdumannonov 18'; Kryeziu 39'; Azimov 42'	Stadium: AGMK Stadium; Referee: Rustam Lutfullin

3 May 2025	Surkhon	2–1	Pakhtakor	Termiz
UZT (UTC+5)	Abdurahmonov 59'; Tursunov 65'	Report	Sergeev 90+6'	Stadium: Surxon; Referee: Ravshan Abduvohidov

4 May 2025	Neftchi	2–1	Sogdiana	Fargʻona
UZT (UTC+5)	Andreyev 31'; Marušić 42'	Report	Hoshimov 23'	Stadium: Istiqlol; Referee: Shavkat Nasibullayev

4 May 2025	Qizilqum	3–2	Navbahor	Navoiy
UZT (UTC+5)	Vahobov 18'; Komilov 52'; Lobjanidze 90+12'	Report	Gʻulomov 4'; Odilov 44'	Stadium: Yoshlar; Referee: Ahrol Risqullayev

4 May 2025	Shurtan	1–3	Dinamo	Gʻuzor
UZT (UTC+5)	Xudoyberdiyev 90+8'	Report	Mirahmadov 49'; Oʻrmonjonov 90'; Halilov 90+8'	Stadium: Gʻuzor; Referee: Nikita Mustafin

=== Round 9 ===
9 May 2025	Andijon	0–2	Neftchi	Andijon
UZT (UTC+5)		Report	Sayfiyev 11'; Iskanderov 60'	Stadium: Bobur; Referee: Ilgiz Tantashev

9 May 2025	Dinamo	1–0	Surkhon	Samarqand
UZT (UTC+5)	Friday 21'	Report		Stadium: Dinamo; Referee: Temurbek Toʻxtasinov

10 May 2025	Kokand 1912	1–3	AGMK	Qoʻqon
UZT (UTC+5)	Oʻlmasaliyev 38'	Report	Oʻlmasaliyev 73'; Sobirjonov 81'; Sobirjonov 88'	Stadium: Markaziy; Referee: Asker Najafaliyev

10 May 2025	Nasaf	2–2	Bunyodkor	Qarshi
UZT (UTC+5)	Hebaj 23'; Bozorov 84'	Report	Abdusalomov 77'; Bugarin 90+1'	Stadium: Qarshi; Referee: Olim Toʻychiboyev

10 May 2025	Pakhtakor	6–0	Bukhara	Toshkent
UZT (UTC+5)	Sergeev 22'; Oʻrinboyev 37'; Oʻrinboyev 49'; Resan 60'; Ibrohimov 62'; Usmonov 90+6'	Report		Stadium: Jar; Referee: Gʻayrat Joʻrayev

11 May 2025	Navbahor	1–0	Khorazm	Namangan
UZT (UTC+5)	Oʻrinboyev 50'	Report		Stadium: Navbahor; Referee: Doston Rahmonov

11 May 2025	Mash'al	2–2	Qizilqum	Gʻuzor
UZT (UTC+5)	Murtozoyev 21'; Murtozoyev 72'	Report	Mašović 54'; Mašović 67'	Stadium: Gʻuzor; Referee: Xushnud Suyunboyev

11 May 2025	Sogdiana	1–1	Shurtan	Jizzax
UZT (UTC+5)	Ahadov 90+5'	Report	Qobilov 77'	Stadium: Soʻgʻdiyona

=== Round 10 ===
17 May 2025	Surkhon	2–1	Sogdiana	Termiz
UZT (UTC+5)	Pletnyov 56'; Muhammadali Abdurahmonov 72'	Report	Panjshanbe 63'	Stadium: Surxon arena Referee: Ibrohim Ismoilov

17 May 2025	Bukhara	2–2	Dinamo	Toshkent
UZT (UTC+5)	Joʻrabekov 65'; Ikic 74'	Report	Xojimirzayev 34'; Halilov 87'	Stadium: Jar; Referee: Firdavs Norsafarov

19 May 2025	Kokand 1912	0–2	Nasaf	Qoʻqon
UZT (UTC+5)		Report	Čolović 35'; Norchayev 51'	Stadium: Markaziy; Referee: Ilgiz Tantashev

17 May 2025	Shurtan	1–0	Andijon	Gʻuzor
UZT (UTC+5)	Narzullayev 33'	Report		Stadium: Gʻuzor; Referee: Rustam Choriyev

18 May 2025	Bunyodkor	2–3	Navbahor	Toshkent
UZT (UTC+5)	Ashortia 10'; Kaçorri 90+10'	Report	Jiyanov 20', 68'; Komilov 71'	Stadium: Milliy Stadium; Referee: Ravshan Abduvohidov

18 May 2025	Khorazm	3–0	Mash'al	Jizzax
UZT (UTC+5)	Samiev 7'; Tursunqulov 18'; Abdullajonov 58'	Report		Stadium: Soʻgʻdiyona

18 May 2025	Qizilqum	0–3	Pakhtakor	Navoiy
UZT (UTC+5)		Report	Sergeev 21'; Oʻrinboyev 73'; Hamdamov 86'	Stadium: Yoshlar

16 May 2025	AGMK	2–2	Neftchi	Olmaliq
UZT (UTC+5)	Sobirjonov 22'; Toʻxtaxoʻjayev 82'	Report	Ismoilov 64'; Ismoilov 66'	Stadium: OKMK; Referee: Temur Toʻxtasinov

=== Round 11 ===
23 May 2025	Andijon	2–1	Surkhon	Andijon
UZT (UTC+5)	Abdumannonov 48'; Abdumannopov 54'	Report	Tursunov 5'	Stadium: Bobur; Referee: Abdurashid Xudoyberganov

23 May 2025	Nasaf	2–1	AGMK	Qarshi
UZT (UTC+5)	Norchayev 16'; Ćeran 78'	Report	Abdurazzoqov 52'	Stadium: Markaziy; Referee: Shavkat Nasibullayev

24 May 2025	Neftchi	4–0	Shurtan	Fargʻona
UZT (UTC+5)	Ciger 45+2'; Iskanderov 65'; Yoʻldoshev 82'; Toshmirzayev 84'	Report		Stadium: Istiqlol; Referee: Xushnud Suyunboyev

24 May 2025	Sogdiana	1–1	Bukhara	Jizzax
UZT (UTC+5)	Doriyev 23'	Report	Joʻrabekov 16'	Stadium: Soʻgʻdiyona; Referee: Olim To'ychiboyev

25 May 2025	Navbahor	3–0	Kokand 1912	Namangan
UZT (UTC+5)	Gabriel 21'; Gʻulomov 22'; Jiyanov 48'	Report		Stadium: Navbahor

25 May 2025	Pakhtakor	2–1	Khorazm	Toshkent
UZT (UTC+5)	Sergeev 5'; Bubanja 90+8'	Report	Ismoilov 24'	Stadium: Jar; Referee: Toʻrabek Suyunov

25 May 2025	Dinamo	3–2	Qizilqum	Samarqand
UZT (UTC+5)	Oʻrmonjonov 51'; Ratinho 77'; Qodirqulov 90+7'	Report	Papariga 22'; Rahmatullayev 60'	Stadium: Dinamo

26 May 2025	Mash'al	1–1	Bunyodkor	Jizzax
UZT (UTC+5)	Qobilov 90+5'	Report	Ahadov 77'	Stadium: Gʻuzor; Referee: Toʻrabek Suyunov

=== Round 12 ===
13 June 2025	Kokand 1912	0–4	Mash'al	Qoʻqon
UZT (UTC+5)		Report	Murtazoyev 1', 75'; Muzaffarov 65'; Baratov 78'	Stadium: Markaziy; Referee: Gʻayrat Joʻrayev

13 June 2025	Bukhara	1–1	Andijon	Samarqand
UZT (UTC+5)	Joʻrabekov 77'	Report	Abdumannonov 58'	Stadium: Dinamo; Referee: Shavkat Nasibullayev

14 June 2025	Bunyodkor	1–1	Pakhtakor	Toshkent
UZT (UTC+5)	Temurxoʻja Abduxoliqov 24'	Report	Sergeev 57'	Stadium: Milliy Stadium; Referee: Asker Najafaliyev

14 June 2025	Qizilqum	0–0	Sogdiana	Navoiy
UZT (UTC+5)		Report		Stadium: Yoshlar; Referee: Temur Toʻxtasinov

14 June 2025	AGMK	0–0	Shurtan	Olmaliq
UZT (UTC+5)		Report		Stadium: OKMK; Referee: Abdurashid Xudoyberganov

15 June 2025	Khorazm	1–2	Dinamo	Jizzax
UZT (UTC+5)	Bobojonov 25'	Report	Abdurahmonov 33'; Oʻrmonjonov 60'	Stadium: Soʻgʻdiyona; Referee: Akobirxoʻja Shukrullayev

15 June 2025	Surkhon	0–0	Neftchi	Termiz
UZT (UTC+5)		Report		Stadium: Surkhon; Referee: Toʻrabek Suyunov

15 June 2025	Nasaf	1–0	Navbahor	Qarshi
UZT (UTC+5)	Ceran 77'	Report		Stadium: Markaziy; Referee: Olim Toʻychiboyev

=== Round 13 ===
19 June 2025	Andijon	1–1	Qizilqum	Andijon
UZT (UTC+5)	Yorqinboyev 77'	Report	Bekmurodov 77'	Stadium: Bobur; Referee: Ibrohim Ismoilov

19 June 2025	Sogdiana	1–0	Khorazm	Jizzax
UZT (UTC+5)	Doriyev 83'	Report		Stadium: Soʻgʻdiyona; Referee: Asker Najafaliyev

20 June 2025	Neftchi	1–0	Bukhara	Fargʻona
UZT (UTC+5)	Đokić 89'	Report		Stadium: Istiqlol; Referee: Doston Rahmonov

20 June 2025	Mash'al	1–3	Nasaf	Gʻuzor
UZT (UTC+5)	Muzaffarov 59'	Report	Norchayev 6'; Norchayev 66'; Ćeran 74'	Stadium: Gʻuzor; Referee: Firdavs Norsafarov

21 June 2025	Navbahor	3–0	AGMK	Namangan
UZT (UTC+5)	Oʻrinboyev 5'; Guedes 35'; Pedro 90+7'	Report		Stadium: Navbahor; Referee: Akobirxoʻja Shukrullayev

22 June 2025	Pakhtakor	2–0	Kokand 1912	Toshkent
UZT (UTC+5)	Xolmatov 17'; Riascos 90+5'	Report		Stadium: Jar; Referee: Rustam Choriyev

22 June 2025	Shurtan	2–1	Surkhon	Gʻuzor
UZT (UTC+5)	Qodirov 45+4'; Toshqoʻziyev 65'	Report	Sherboʻtayev 7'	Stadium: Gʻuzor; Referee: Rustam Lutfullin

23 June 2025	Dinamo	0–3	Bunyodkor	Samarqand
UZT (UTC+5)		Report	Abduxoliqov 11'; Abduxoliqov 45+1'; Abdusalomov 47'	Stadium: Dinamo; Referee: G‘ayrat Joʻrayev

=== Round 14 ===
26 June 2025	Khorazm	2–3	Andijon	Jizzax
20.00 UZT (UTC+5)	Rahimov 53'; Bubanja 26'	Report	Abdumannopov 11'; Mamatkazin 80'; Abdumannonov 87'	Stadium: Soʻgʻdiyona; Referee: Firdavs Norsafarov

27 June 2025	Kokand 1912	2–3	Dinamo	Qoʻqon
20.00 UZT (UTC+5)	Xoltoʻrayev 11', 61'	Report	Xojimirzayev 30', 74'; Mustafoyev 43'	Stadium: Qoʻqon; Referee: Shavkat Nasibullayev

27 June 2025	Nasaf	2–2	Pakhtakor	Qarshi
20.00 UZT (UTC+5)	Norchayev 29', 62'	Report	Hamdamov 90'; Riascos 90+4'	Stadium: Qarshi; Referee: Temurbek Toʻxtasinov

28 June 2025	Navbahor	6–0	Mash'al	Namangan
20.00 UZT (UTC+5)	Odilov 7'; Jiyanov 22'; Oʻrinboyev 37'; Gʻulomov 39', 53'; Pedro 84'	Report		Stadium: Navbahor; Referee: Nikita Mustafin

28 June 2025	Qizilqum	1–1	Neftchi	Navoiy
20.00 UZT (UTC+5)	Aliboyev 69'	Report	Aliboyev 90+5' (o.g.)	Stadium: Yoshlar

29 June 2025	Bunyodkor	3–2	Sogdiana	Jizzax
20.00 UZT (UTC+5)	Abdusalomov 41'; Kaçorri 75'; Olimjonov 77'	Report	Joʻraboyev 26'; Andreyev 39'	Stadium: Doʻstlik; Referee: Nayim Qosimov

29 June 2025	Bukhara	3–1	Shurtan	Samarqand
20.00 UZT (UTC+5)	Qayumov 40'; Čirjak 50'; Poʻlatov 86'	Report	Narzullayev 30'	Stadium: Dinamo; Referee: Olim Toʻychiboyev

30 June 2025	AGMK	0–1	Surkhon	Olmaliq
20.00 UZT (UTC+5)		Report	Jumayev 58'	Stadium: AGMK Stadium; Referee: Ahrol Risqullayev

=== Round 15 ===
3 July 2025	Shurtan	1–2	Qizilqum	Gʻuzor
UZT (UTC+5)	Qodirov 45+2'	Report	Papariga 40'; Vahobov 72'	Stadium: Gʻuzor; Attendance: 2260; Referee: Gʻayrat Joʻrayev

4 July 2025	Sogdiana	2–1	Kokand 1912	Jizzax
20:00 UZT (UTC+5)	Doriyev 35', 41'	Report	Hasanov 47'	Stadium: Soʻgʻdiyona stadioni Attendance: 1254; Referee: Akobirxoʻja Shukurullayev

4 July 2025	Surkhon	0–0	Bukhara	Termiz
20:00 UZT (UTC+5)		Report		Stadium: Surxon stadioni Attendance: 2421; Referee: Ravshan Abduvohidov

5 July 2025	Andijon	0–2	Bunyodkor	Andijon
20:00 UZT (UTC+5)		Report	Kaçorri 38', 76'	Stadium: Bobur stadioni Attendance: 8233; Referee: Toʻrabek Suyunov

5 July 2025	Mash'al	0–1	AGMK	Muborak
20:00 UZT (UTC+5)		Report	Oʻlmasaliyev 4'	Stadium: Bahrom Vafoev stadioni Attendance: 956; Referee: Doston Rahmonov

6 July 2025	Dinamo	2–2	Nasaf	Samarqand
20:00 UZT (UTC+5)	Xojimirzayev 26'; Stanojević 45+4'	Report	Davronov 16'; Mozgovoy 85'	Stadium: Dinamo stadioni Referee: Rustam Lutfullin

6 July 2025	Pakhtakor	2–0	Navbahor	Toshkent
20:00 UZT (UTC+5)	Flamarion 22'; Sergeev 65'	Report		Stadium: Jar stadioni Referee: Nayim Qosimov

7 July 2025	Neftchi	2–0	Khorazm	Fargʻona
20:00 UZT (UTC+5)	Tabatadze 12'; Marušić 69'	Report		Stadium: Istiqlol stadioni Attendance: 9,200; Referee: Ibrohim Ismoilov

=== Round 16 ===
1 August 2025	Bukhara	0–2	AGMK	Qarshi
20:00 UZT (UTC+5)		Report	Senaga 40'; Sanches 53'	Stadium: Qarshi; Attendance: 452; Referee: Ahrol Risqullayev

1 August 2025	Mash'al	0–1	Pakhtakor	Gʻuzor
20:00 UZT (UTC+5)		Report	Hamdamov 74'	Stadium: Gʻuzor; Referee: Toʻrabek Suyunov

2 August 2025	Neftchi	1–2	AGMK	Fargʻona
20:00 UZT (UTC+5)	Ciger 55'	Report	Šroler 50'; Abdunabiyev 87'	Stadium: Istiqlol; Referee: Temurbek Toʻxtasinov

2 August 2025	Sogdiana	1–2	Nasaf	Jizzax
UZT (UTC+5)	Hebaj 58'	Report	Ahadov 27'; Norchayev 6'	Stadium: Soʻgʻdiyona; Referee: Ilgiz Tantashev

2 August 2025	Surkhon	2–2	Navbahor	Samarqand
UZT (UTC+5)	Pletnyov 32'; Kucherenko 36'	Report	Gʻulomov 50'; Jiyanov 54'	Stadium: Dinamo

3 August 2025	Andijon	3–0	Kokand 1912	Andijon
UZT (UTC+5)	Temirov 51', 80'; Mamatkazin 90+4'	Report		Stadium: Bobur Arena

3 August 2025	Shurtan	1–3	Khorazm	Gʻuzor
UZT (UTC+5)	Narzullayev 28'	Report	Bobojonov 33'; Abduhamidov 40'; Samiev 90+2'	Stadium: Gʻuzor

3 August 2025	Surkhon	0–0	Qizilqum	Termiz
UZT (UTC+5)		Report		Stadium: Surxon

=== Round 17 ===
5 August 2025	Pakhtakor	1–2	AGMK	Toshkent
20:00 UZT (UTC+5)	Sergeev 47'	Report	Sanches 17', 47'	Stadium: Jar

6 August 2025	Navbahor	1–1	Sogdiana	Namangan
20:00 UZT (UTC+5)	Oʻrinboyev 7'	Report	Joʻraboyev 51'	Stadium: Navbahor

6 August 2025	Mash'al	2–4	Dinamo	Gʻuzor
20:00 UZT (UTC+5)	Fayziyev 2'; Abduraimov 5'	Report	Hoshimov 24'; Abdusalomov 45+5'; Oblaqulov 89', 90+2'	Stadium: Gʻuzor; Referee: Abdurashid Xudoyberganov

7 August 2025	Kokand 1912	1–2	Neftchi	Qoʻqon
20:00 UZT (UTC+5)	Shohrux Gadoyev 83'	Report	Odilov 9'; Đokić 89'	Stadium: Qoʻqon; Referee: Gʻayrat Joʻrayev

7 August 2025	Nasaf	1–1	Andijon	Qarshi
20:00 UZT (UTC+5)	Bozorov 60'	Report	Temirov 6'	Stadium: Qarshi; Referee: Shavkat Nasibullayev

8 August 2025	Khorazm	2–2	Surkhon	Olmaliq
20:00 UZT (UTC+5)	Bobojonov 45+3'; Samiev 86'	Report	Poyonov 4'; Turdimurodov 78'	Stadium: OKMK; Referee: Olim Toʻychiboyev

8 August 2025	Qizilqum	1–0	Bukhara	Navoiy
20:00 UZT (UTC+5)	Norxonov 45+3'	Report		Stadium: Yoshlar sport markazi Referee: Olim Toʻychiboyev

8 August 2025	AGMK	1–1	Shurtan	Toshkent
20:00 UZT (UTC+5)	Ashortia 31'	Report	Qodirov 45+5'	Stadium: Jar sport markazi Referee: Ilgiz Tantashev

=== Round 18 ===
10 August 2025	Sogdiana	2–0	Mash'al	Jizzax
20:00 UZT (UTC+5)	Qahramonov 27'; Hebaj 75'	Report		Stadium: Soʻgʻdiyona; Referee: Shavkat Nasibullayev

11 August 2025	Neftchi	1–0	Nasaf	Fargʻona
20:00 UZT (UTC+5)	Iskanderov 28'	Report		Stadium: Istiqlol; Referee: Ilgiz Tantashev

11 August 2025	Dinamo	1–1	Pakhtakor	Samarqand
20:00 UZT (UTC+5)	Friday 19'	Report	Abduholiqov 85'	Stadium: Dinamo

12 August 2025	AGMK	0–0	Qizilqum	Olmaliq
18:15 UZT (UTC+5)		Report		Stadium: AGMK Stadium; Referee: Ibrohim Ismoilov

12 August 2025	Andijon	0–1	Navbahor	Samarqand
20:00 UZT (UTC+5)	Friday 19'	Report	Abduholiqov 85'	Stadium: Dinamo; Referee: Temurbek Toʻxtasinov

12 August 2025	Shurtan	1–2	Kokand 1912	Gʻuzor
20:00 UZT (UTC+5)	Pirmuhamedov 45'	Report	Haydarov 6'; Daci 36'	Stadium: Gʻuzor

13 August 2025	Bukhara	1–1	Khorazm	Qarshi
20:00 UZT (UTC+5)	Begić 90'	Report	Samiev 55'	Stadium: Qarshi

13 August 2025	Surkhon	3–1	AGMK	Termiz
20:00 UZT (UTC+5)	Turdimurodov 17', 72'; Jumayev 34'	Report	Urata 90+3'	Stadium: Surxon

=== Round 19 ===
15 August 2025	Pakhtakor	2–0	Sogdiana	Termiz
20:00 UZT (UTC+5)	Ibrohimov 14'; Alijonov 73'	Report		Stadium: Jar; Referee: Firdavs Norsafarov

16 August 2025	Navbahor	0–1	Neftchi	Namangan
20:00 UZT (UTC+5)		Report	Aliboyev 33'	Stadium: Navbahor; Referee: Firdavs Norsafarov

16 August 2025	Dinamo	1–0	AGMK	Samarqand
20:00 UZT (UTC+5)		Report	Xojimirzayev 47'	Stadium: Dinamo; Referee: Ahrol Risqullayev

16 August 2025	Nasaf	2–0	Shurtan	Qarshi
20:00 UZT (UTC+5)	Muhiddinov 61'; Nasrullayev 65'	Report		Stadium: Qarshi; Referee: Asker Najafaliyev

17 August 2025	Kokand 1912	2–0	Surkhon	Qoʻqon
20:00 UZT (UTC+5)	Daci 7'; Husanov 90+3'	Report		Stadium: Markaziy; Referee: Doston Rahmonov

17 August 2025	Mash'al	1–0	Andijon	Gʻuzor
20:00 UZT (UTC+5)	Murtozayev 41'	Report		Stadium: Gʻuzor; Referee: Doston Rahmonov

17 August 2025	AGMK	2–1	Bukhara	Toshkent
20:00 UZT (UTC+5)	Krivokapić 49'; Toʻraqulov 90+5'	Report	Normurodov 70'	Stadium: Jar; Referee: Gʻayrat Joʻrayev

18 August 2025	Khorazm	0–1	Qizilqum	Urganch
20:00 UZT (UTC+5)		Report	Rahmatullayev 6'	Stadium: Xorazm; Referee: Xushnud Suyunboyev

=== Round 20 ===
20 August 2025	Shurtan	3–3	Navbahor	Gʻuzor
UZT (UTC+5)	Narzullayev 2', 33'; Xoldorxonov 90+6'	Report	Pedro 22', 60'; Gʻulomov 79'	Stadium: Gʻuzor; Referee: Abdurashid Xudoyberganov

20 August 2025	Sogdiana	1–1	Dinamo	Jizzax
UZT (UTC+5)	Doriyev 90+6'	Report	Muhammadjonov 29'	Stadium: Soʻgʻdiyona; Referee: Ilgiz Tantashev

21 August 2025	Neftchi	3–0	Mash'al	Fargʻona
19.30 UZT (UTC+5)	Kojo 34', 70'; Gʻofurov 63'	Report		Stadium: Istiqlol

21 August 2025	Bukhara	1–0	Kokand 1912	Qarshi
17.45 UZT (UTC+5)	Tabatadze	Report		Stadium: Markaziy

22 August 2025	Andijon	2–6	Pakhtakor	Andijon
20.00 UZT (UTC+5)	Akinade 70'; Abdullayev 84'	Report	Resan 4'; Resan 31'; Tokatayev 42'; Hamdamov 84'; Riascos 90+2'; Erkinov 90+5'	Stadium: Bobur; Attendance: 11490; Referee: Nayim Qosimov

22 August 2025	Qizilqum	1–1	AGMK	Navoiy
20.00 UZT (UTC+5)	Kenjaboyev 77'	Report	Ashortia 15'	Stadium: Yoshlar; Attendance: 3851; Referee: Firdavs Norsafarov

23 August 2025	Surkhon	1–2	Nasaf	Termiz
20.00 UZT (UTC+5)	Turdimurodov 90+1'	Report	Norchayev 57'; Norchayev 61'	Stadium: Surxon; Attendance: 4314; Referee: Akobirxoʻja Shukrullayev

23 August 2025	AGMK	3–1	Khorazm	Olmaliq
20.00 UZT (UTC+5)	Xolmurodov 8'; Papava 72'; Senaga 89'	Report	Bobojonov 15'	Stadium: AGMK Stadium; Attendance: 1012; Referee: Asker Najafaliyev

=== Round 21 ===
10 September 2025	Nasaf	5–0	Bukhara	Qarshi
UZT (UTC+5)	Norchayev 13'; Otubanjo 25', 30'; Muhiddinov 28'; Ćeran 47'	Report		Stadium: Qarshi; Referee: Firdavs Norsafarov

11 September 2025	Mash'al	2–1	Shurtan	Gʻuzor
UZT (UTC+5)	Ochilov 36'; Murtozoyev 41'	Report	Xoldorxonov 56'	Stadium: Gʻuzor; Referee: Doston Rahmonov

12 September 2025	Sogdiana	4–1	AGMK	Jizzax
UZT (UTC+5)	Doriyev 28', 47'; Abdurahmonov 49'; Mavlonqulov 78'	Report	Oʻlmasaliyev 68'	Stadium: Soʻgʻdiyona; Referee: Shavkat Nasibullayev

12 September 2025	Navbahor	0–0	Surkhon	Namangan
UZT (UTC+5)		Report		Stadium: Navbahor; Referee: Temurbek Toʻxtasinov

13 September 2025	Kokand 1912	4–1	Qizilqum	Qoʻqon
UZT (UTC+5)	Daci 16'; Hasanov 47'	Report	Kenjaboyev 28'	Stadium: Qoʻqon; Referee: Ravshan Abduvohidov

13 September 2025	Pakhtakor	2–1	Neftchi	Namangan
UZT (UTC+5)	Turgʻunboyev 11'; Sergeev 45+2'	Report	Aliboyev 39'	Stadium: Navbahor; Referee: Nayim Qosimov

14 September 2025	AGMK	1–0	Khorazm	Toshkent
UZT (UTC+5)	Abduxoliqov 82'	Report		Stadium: Olimpiya; Referee: Toʻrabek Suyunov

15 November 2025	Dinamo	2–0	Andijon	Samarqand
UZT (UTC+5)	Oʻrmonjonov 27'; Jumaboyev 55'	Report		Stadium: Dinamo; Referee: Abdurashid Xudoyberganov

=== Round 22 ===
18 September 2025	Surkhon	0–0	Mash'al	Termiz
UZT (UTC+5)		Report		Stadium: Surxon; Referee: Nikita Mustafin

19 September 2025	AGMK	5–1	AGMK	Olmaliq
UZT (UTC+5)	Gʻiyosov 41', 64'; Abdurazzoqov 57'; Sanches 76'; Oʻlmasaliyev 83'	Report	Normurodov 48'	Stadium: AGMK Stadium; Referee: Abdurashid Xudoyberganov

19 September 2025	Shurtan	0–0	Pakhtakor	Gʻuzor
UZT (UTC+5)		Report		Stadium: Gʻuzor; Referee: Olim Toʻychiboyev

20 September 2025	Khorazm	0–0	Kokand 1912	Urganch
UZT (UTC+5)		Report		Stadium: Xorazm

20 September 2025	Bukhara	5–0	Navbahor	Buxoro
UZT (UTC+5)	Begić 3', 31', 45+5'; Tabatadze 41', 4'	Report		Stadium: Buxoro FA

20 September 2025	Neftchi	2–1	Dinamo	Fargʻona
UZT (UTC+5)	Ciger 13'; Jovović 83'	Report	Xojimirzayev 16'	Stadium: Istiqlol

21 September 2025	Andijon	2–2	Sogdiana	Andijon
UZT (UTC+5)	Ismonaliyev 65'; Usmonov 90+6'	Report	Mavlonqulov 76'; Doriyev 88'	Stadium: Bobur

21 September 2025	Qizilqum	2–2	Nasaf	Navoiy
UZT (UTC+5)		Report	Ćeran 90+6'	Stadium: Yoshlar; Referee: Ibrohim Ismoilov

=== Round 23 ===
25 September 2025	Nasaf	2–1	Khorazm	Qarshi
UZT (UTC+5)	Muhiddinov 45+2'; Nasrullayev 79'	Report	Samiyev 45'	Stadium: Qarshi; Referee: Rustam Choriyev

26 September 2025	Andijon	1–0	AGMK	Andijon
UZT (UTC+5)	Ismonaliyev 30'	Report		Stadium: Bobur; Referee: Ravshan Abduvohidov

27 September 2025	Navbahor	1–0	Qizilqum	Namangan
UZT (UTC+5)	Pedro 69'	Report		Stadium: Navbahor; Referee: Toʻrabek Suyunov

28 September 2025	Kokand 1912	2–2	AGMK	Qoʻqon
UZT (UTC+5)	Toshtemirov 69'; Karimov 69'	Report	Toʻraqulov 40'; Abduxoliqov 88'	Stadium: Qoʻqon; Referee: Gʻayrat Joʻrayev

29 September 2025	Dinamo	2–0	Shurtan	Samarqand
UZT (UTC+5)	Xojimirzayev 14'; Oblaqulov 90+2'	Report		Stadium: Dinamo; Referee: Xushnud Suyunboyev

29 September 2025	Pakhtakor	1–0	Surkhon	Toshkent
UZT (UTC+5)	Sergeev 90'	Report		Stadium: Jar; Referee: Ibrohim Ismoilov

30 September 2025	Mash'al	0–0	Bukhara	Gʻuzor
UZT (UTC+5)		Report		Stadium: Gʻuzor; Referee: Shavkat Nasibullayev

30 September 2025	Sogdiana	0–1	Neftchi	Jizzax
UZT (UTC+5)		Report	Iskanderov 38'	Stadium: Soʻgʻdiyona; Referee: Temurbek Toʻxtasinov

=== Round 24 ===
3 October 2025	Khorazm	1–1	Navbahor	Urganch
UZT (UTC+5)	Bobojonov 71'	Report	Gʻulomov 24'	Stadium: Xorazm; Referee: Ilgiz Tantashev

3 October 2025	AGMK	0–1	Kokand 1912	Olmaliq
UZT (UTC+5)		Report	Haydarov 3'	Stadium: OKMK; Referee: Shavkat Nasibullayev

4 October 2025	Surkhon	0–2	Dinamo	Termiz
UZT (UTC+5)		Report	Abdurahmonov 7'; Abdusalomov 29'	Stadium: Surxon; Referee: Firdavs Norsafarov

4 October 2025	Bukhara	0–4	Pakhtakor	Buxoro
UZT (UTC+5)		Report	Resan 28'; Flamarion 39'; Sergeev 80', 85'	Stadium: Buxoro FA; Referee: Gʻayrat Joʻrayev

4 October 2025	AGMK	2–2	Nasaf	Toshkent
UZT (UTC+5)	Ashortia 14'; Toʻraqulov 41'	Report	Davronov 21'; Norchayev 58'	Stadium: Olimpiya; Referee: Doston Rahmonov

5 October 2025	Shurtan	1–2	Sogdiana	Gʻuzor
UZT (UTC+5)	Kenjaboyev 61'	Report	Abdurahmonov 23'; Rahmonov 50'	Stadium: Gʻuzor; Referee: Akobirxoʻra Shukurullayev

5 October 2025	Neftchi	2–0	Andijon	Fargʻona
UZT (UTC+5)	Ismoilov 44'; Kojo 77'	Report		Stadium: Istiqlol; Referee: Asker Najafaliyev

5 October 2025	Qizilqum	1–0	Mash'al	Navoiy
UZT (UTC+5)	Kenjaboyev 78'	Report		Stadium: Yoshlar; Referee: Ahrol Risqullayev

=== Round 25 ===
16 October 2025	Nasaf	3–0	Kokand 1912	Qarshi
UZT (UTC+5)	Ćeran 24'; Norchayev 68'; Nasrullayev 84'	Report		Stadium: Qarshi; Referee: Temurbek To'xtasinov

17 October 2025	Mash'al	0–3	Khorazm	Gʻuzor
UZT (UTC+5)		Report	Ismoilov 18'; Abduhamidov 45+3'; Samiyev 73'	Stadium: Gʻuzor; Referee: Rustam Lutfullin

17 October 2025	Andijon	4–3	Shurtan	Andijon
UZT (UTC+5)	Joʻraqoʻziyev 5'; Ismonaliyev 17', 54'; Abdumannopov 61'	Report	Xoldorxonov 20', 63'; Narzullayev 34'	Stadium: Bobur; Referee: Ibrohim Ismoilov

17 October 2025	Sogdiana	2–1	Surkhon	Jizzax
UZT (UTC+5)	Hebaj 2'; Doriyev 10'	Report	Abduhamidov 90+3'	Stadium: Soʻgʻdiyona; Referee: Ilgiz Tantashev

18 October 2025	Navbahor	0–2	AGMK	Namangan
UZT (UTC+5)		Report	Ashortia 7', 21'	Stadium: Navbahor; Referee: Firdavs Norsafarov

18 October 2025	Dinamo	4–1	Bukhara	Samarqand
UZT (UTC+5)	Abdurahmonov 60', 77'; Stanojević 71'; Xojimirzayev 87'	Report	Tabatadze 21'	Stadium: Dinamo; Referee: Ravshan Abduvohidov

19 October 2025	Pakhtakor	3–0	Qizilqum	Toshkent
UZT (UTC+5)	Sergeev 17', 82'; Tahseen 45'	Report		Stadium: Jar; Referee: Olim Toʻychiboyev

19 October 2025	Neftchi	1–0	AGMK	Fargʻona
UZT (UTC+5)	Iskanderov 17'	Report		Stadium: Istiqlol; Referee: Doston Rahmonov

=== Round 26 ===
23 October 2025	Khorazm	0–1	Pakhtakor	Urganch
UZT (UTC+5)		Report	Ibrohimov 77'	Stadium: Xorazm; Referee: Toʻrabek Suyunov

23 October 2025	Bukhara	2–0	Sogdiana	Buxoro
UZT (UTC+5)	Poʻlatov 8', 14'	Report		Stadium: Buxoro FA; Referee: Shavkat Nasibullayev

24 October 2025	Qizilqum	2–0	Dinamo	Navoiy
UZT (UTC+5)	Kenjaboyev 2'; Jighauri 32'	Report		Stadium: Yoshlar; Referee: Abdurashid Xudoyberganov

25 October 2025	Shurtan	0–2	Neftchi	Gʻuzor
UZT (UTC+5)		Report	Marušić 40'; Jovović 88'	Stadium: Gʻuzor; Referee: Rustam Lutfullin

25 October 2025	Kokand 1912	2–0	Navbahor	Qoʻqon
UZT (UTC+5)	Giorgadze 90+5'; Husanov 90+11'	Report		Stadium: Qoʻqon; Referee: Akobirxoʻja Shukurullayev

26 October 2025	AGMK	1–1	Nasaf	Olmaliq
UZT (UTC+5)	Abdurazzoqov 54'	Report	Ćeran 88'	Stadium: AGMK Stadium; Referee: Asker Najafaliyev

26 October 2025	Bunyodkor	2–1	Mash'al	Toshkent
UZT (UTC+5)	Krivokapić 50'; Šroler 55'	Report	Murodov 70'	Stadium: Olimpiya; Referee: G'ayrat Jo'rayev

27 October 2025	Surkhon	4–0	Andijon	Termiz
UZT (UTC+5)	Turdimurodov 11'; Karimov 21', 41'; Joʻrayev 52'	Report		Stadium: Alpomish; Referee: Nayim Qosimov

=== Round 27 ===
30 October 2025	Dinamo	3–1	Khorazm	Toshkent
UZT (UTC+5)	Ratinho 8'; Ismailov 51'; Halilov	Report	Ismoilov 18'	Stadium: Jar; Referee: Akobirxo'ja Shukurullayev

30 October 2025	Navbahor	0–0	Nasaf	Namangan
UZT (UTC+5)		Report		Stadium: Navbahor; Referee: Ilgiz Tantashev

31 October 2025	Shurtan	4–3	AGMK	Gʻuzor
UZT (UTC+5)	Xoldorxonov 50', 57'; Turdialiyev 70'; Hakimov 90+9'	Report	Gʻiyosov 40'; Abdurahmonov 84'; Senaga 90+3'	Stadium: Gʻuzor; Referee: Nikita Mustafin

1 November 2025	Andijon	1–1	Bukhara	Andijon
UZT (UTC+5)	G‘ulomov 68'	Report	Begić 57'	Stadium: Bobur; Referee: Rustam Choriyev

2 November 2025	Neftchi	2–1	Surkhon	Fargʻona
UZT (UTC+5)	Marušić 21', 58'	Report	Karimov 71'	Stadium: Istiqlol; Referee: G'ayrat Jo'rayev

2 November 2025	Sogdiana	3–0	Qizilqum	Zomin
UZT (UTC+5)	Doriyev 14'; Hebaj 34', 53'	Report		Stadium: Zomin; Referee: Ravshan Abduvohidov

2 November 2025	Mash'al	1–0	Kokand 1912	Gʻuzor
UZT (UTC+5)	Murtozoyev 13'	Report		Stadium: Gʻuzor; Referee: Ibrohim Ismoilov

3 November 2025	Pakhtakor	4–2	AGMK	Toshkent
UZT (UTC+5)	Hamdamov 6'; Alijonov 12'; Ibrohimov 45'; Erkinov 90+5'	Report	Krivokapić 52'; Abduxoliqov 57'	Stadium: Jar; Referee: Shavkat Nasibullayev

=== Round 28 ===
7 November 2025	Bukhara	1–1	Neftchi	Buxoro
UZT (UTC+5)	Begić 82'	Report	Jovović 51'	Stadium: Buxoro FA; Referee: Asker Najafaliyev

7 November 2025	AGMK	3–1	Navbahor	Olmaliq
UZT (UTC+5)	Abdurahmonov 27'; Sanches 28'; Abdurazzoqov 40'	Report	Oʻrinboyev 81'	Stadium: OKMK; Referee: Ahrol Risqullayev

8 November 2025	Kokand 1912	0–0	Pakhtakor	Qoʻqon
UZT (UTC+5)		Report		Stadium: Qoʻqon; Referee: Firdavs Norsafarov

8 November 2025	Bunyodkor	1–3	Dinamo	Toshkent
UZT (UTC+5)	Ashortia 42'	Report	Abdusalomov 44'; Pletnyov 72'; Abdurahmonov 90+3'	Stadium: Olimpiya; Referee: Temurbek To'xtasinov

8 November 2025	Nasaf	1–2	Mash'al	Qarshi
UZT (UTC+5)	Muhiddinov 13'	Report	Sharipov 15'; Umar 90+3'	Stadium: Qarshi; Referee: Rustam Choriyev

9 November 2025	Qizilqum	1–2	Andijon	Navoiy
UZT (UTC+5)	Nowak 1'; Norxonov 72'	Report	Temirov 45+4'	Stadium: Yoshlar; Referee: Ilgiz Tantashev

9 November 2025	Khorazm	0–2	Sogdiana	Xorazm
UZT (UTC+5)		Report	Doriyev 84'; Jaloliddinov 90+3'	Stadium: Xorazm; Referee: Abdurashid Xudoyberganov

10 November 2025	Surkhon	1–0	Shurtan	Termiz
UZT (UTC+5)	Abduhamidov 84'	Report		Stadium: Alpomish; Referee: Doston Rahmonov

=== Round 29 ===
19 November 2025	Shurtan	1–1	Bukhara	Gʻuzor
UZT (UTC+5)	Xoldorxonov 65'	Report	Ikić 58'	Stadium: Gʻuzor; Referee: Ahrol Risqullayev

20 November 2025	Surkhon	0–0	AGMK	Termiz
UZT (UTC+5)		Report		Stadium: Alpomish; Referee: Asker Najafaliyev

20 November 2025	Pakhtakor	1–0	Nasaf	Toshkent
UZT (UTC+5)	Sergeev 45+4'	Report		Stadium: Jar; Referee: Ilgiz Tantashev

20 November 2025	Mash'al	0–0	Navbahor	Gʻuzor
UZT (UTC+5)		Report		Stadium: Gʻuzor; Referee: Olim Toʻychiboyev

21 November 2025	Dinamo	0–0	Kokand 1912	Samarqand
UZT (UTC+5)		Report		Stadium: Dinamo; Referee: Xushnud Suyunboyev

21 November 2025	Andijon	3–2	Khorazm	Andijon
UZT (UTC+5)	Abdumannopov 25'; Akinade 28'; Gʻulomov 43'	Report	Saidxonov 45'; Tursunqulov 65'	Stadium: Bobur; Referee: Firdavs Norsafarov

22 November 2025	Sogdiana	0–2	AGMK	Zomin
UZT (UTC+5)		Report	Rahimjonov 45'; Ashortia 60'	Stadium: Zomin; Referee: Shavkat Nasibullayev

22 November 2025	Andijon	4–1	Khorazm	Fargʻona
UZT (UTC+5)	Odilov 3', 19'; Iskanderov 66'; Yoʻldoshev 87'	Report	Norxonov 60'	Stadium: Istiqlol; Referee: Temurbek Toʻxtasinov

=== Round 30 ===
29 November 2025	Nasaf	0–0	Dinamo	Qarshi
UZT (UTC+5)		Hisobot		Stadium: Qarshi; Referee: Ahrol Risqullayev

29 November 2025	Navbahor	1–1	Paxtakor	Namangan
UZT (UTC+5)	Sergeev 14'	Hisobot	Oʻrinboyev 82'	Stadium: Navbahor; Referee: Firdavs Norsafarov

29 November 2025	Qizilqum	3–3	Shurtan	Navoiy
UZT (UTC+5)	Kenjaboyev 29'; Rahmatullayev 57'; Norxonov 90+5'	Hisobot	Asomiddinov 56'; Pirmuhamedov 88'; Qodirov 90+3'	Stadium: Yoshlar; Referee: Nasibabonu Toshmuhamedova

30 November 2025	Kokand 1912	1–1	Soʻgʻdiyona	Qoʻqon
UZT (UTC+5)	Akromov 24'; Kondratyuk 90+1'	Hisobot		Stadium: Qoʻqon; Referee: Gʻayrat Joʻrayev

30 November 2025	Xorazm	2–0	Neftchi	Xorazm
UZT (UTC+5)	Xusinov 2'; Bobojonov 83'	Hisobot		Stadium: Xorazm; Referee: Ravshan Abduvohidov

30 November 2025	Bunyodkor	1–2	Andijon	Toshkent
UZT (UTC+5)	Ashortia 85'	Hisobot	Azmiddinov 45+6'; Ismonaliyev 66'	Stadium: Olimpiya; Referee: Ilgiz Tantashev

30 November 2025	Buxoro	0–1	Surxon	Buxoro
UZT (UTC+5)		Hisobot	Turdimurodov 15'	Stadium: Buxoro FA; Referee: Ibrohim Ismoilov

30 November 2025	AGMK	2–0	Mashʼal	Olmaliq
UZT (UTC+5)	Ismoilov 37' (o.g.); Gʻiyosov 88'	Hisobot		Stadium: AGMK Stadium; Referee: Temurbek Toʻxtasinov

== Results ==
=== Results table ===
Home \ Away	AGM	AND	BUK	BUN	DIN	KHO	KOK	MAS	NAS	NAV	NEF	PAK	QIZ	SOG	SHU	SUR
AGMK	—	4–3	2–1	5–1	0–0	3–1	0–1	2–0	1–1	3–1	2–2	2–0	0–0	3–2	0–0	0–1
Andijon	1–0	—	1–1	0–2	1–2	3–2	3–0	1–0	1–1	0–1	0–2	2–6	1–1	2–2	4–3	2–1
Bukhara	0–2	1–1	—	0–2	2–2	1–1	1–0	1–2	1–3	5–0	1–1	0–4	2–0	2–0	3–1	0–1
Bunyodkor	1–0	1–2	2–1	—	1–3	1–0	1–2	2–1	2–2	2–3	2–2	1–1	0–0	3–2	1–1	3–1
Dinamo	1–0	2–0	4–1	0–3	—	3–1	0–0	1–0	2–2	2–2	0–2	1–1	3–2	1–1	2–0	1–0
Khorazm	0–1	2–3	1–4	0–0	1–2	—	0–0	3–0	1–1	1–1	2–0	0–1	0–1	0–2	2–0	2–2
Kokand 1912	1–3	1–1	1–0	2–2	2–3	1–0	—	0–4	0–2	2–0	1–2	0–0	2–1	2–0	0–0	2–0
Mash'al	0–1	1–0	0–0	1–1	2–4	1–0	1–0	—	1–3	0–0	1–4	0–1	2–2	1–0	2–1	0–0
Nasaf	2–1	1–1	5–0	2–2	0–0	2–1	3–0	1–2	—	1–0	0–0	2–2	4–0	1–0	2–0	1–0
Navbahor	3–0	2–2	3–0	0–2	0–0	1–0	3–0	6–0	0–0	—	0–1	1–1	1–0	1–1	2–0	0–0
Neftchi	1–0	2–0	1–0	1–2	2–1	2–0	0–0	3–0	1–0	3–2	—	0–4	4–1	2–1	4–0	2–1
Pakhtakor	1–2	2–3	6–0	4–2	0–1	2–1	2–0	5–0	1–0	2–0	2–1	—	3–0	2–0	1–0	1–0
Qizilqum	1–3	2–1	1–0	1–1	2–0	0–3	1–0	1–0	0–1	3–2	1–1	0–3	—	0–0	3–3	2–0
Sogdiana	4–1	1–0	1–1	0–2	1–1	1–0	2–1	2–0	1–2	2–3	0–1	2–0	3–0	—	1–1	2–1
Shurtan	4–3	1–0	1–1	0–2	1–3	1–3	1–2	0–1	1–4	3–3	0–2	0–0	1–2	1–2	—	2–1
Surkhon	0–0	4–0	0–0	3–1	0–2	0–2	3–1	0–0	1–2	1–0	0–0	2–1	0–0	2–1	1–0	—

Source: Uzbekistan Professional Football League
Legend: Blue = home team win; Yellow = draw; Red = away team win.

=== Results by match played ===
Team ╲ Round	1	2	3	4	5	6	7	8	9	10	11	12	13	14	15	16	17	18	19	20	21	22	23	24	25	26	27	28	29	30
AGMK	W	W	W	D	W	W	L	W	W	D	L	D	L	L	W	W	W	D	L	W	L	W	L	L	L	D	L	W	D	W
Andijon	D	D	D	W	W	L	L	L	L	L	W	D	D	W	L	W	D	L	L	L	L	D	W	L	W	L	D	L	W	W
Bukhara	L	W	W	L	L	L	L	L	L	D	D	D	L	W	D	L	L	D	L	W	L	W	L	L	L	W	D	D	D	L
Bunyodkor	D	W	W	W	D	D	W	L	D	L	D	D	W	W	W	W	D	L	W	D	W	L	D	D	W	W	L	L	W	L
Dinamo	D	W	W	D	D	W	L	W	W	D	W	W	L	W	D	D	W	D	W	D	W	L	W	W	W	L	W	W	D	D
Khorazm	W	W	L	W	L	D	L	D	L	W	L	L	L	L	L	W	D	D	L	L	L	D	L	D	W	L	L	L	L	W
Kokand 1912	D	D	D	L	W	L	W	W	L	L	L	L	L	L	L	L	L	W	W	L	W	D	D	W	L	W	L	D	D	W
Mash'al	L	L	W	L	L	W	D	W	D	W	D	W	L	L	L	L	L	L	W	L	W	D	D	L	L	L	W	W	D	L
Nasaf	W	D	D	W	W	W	W	D	D	W	W	W	W	D	D	W	D	L	W	W	W	W	W	D	W	D	D	L	L	D
Navbahor	D	W	D	L	W	L	W	L	W	W	W	W	W	W	L	D	D	W	L	D	D	L	W	D	L	L	D	L	D	D
Neftchi	D	D	D	W	W	L	W	W	W	D	W	D	W	D	W	L	W	W	W	W	L	W	W	W	W	W	W	D	W	L
Pakhtakor	W	L	L	L	L	W	W	L	W	W	W	D	W	D	W	W	L	D	W	W	W	D	W	W	W	W	W	D	W	D
Qizilqum	W	L	L	L	D	W	L	W	D	L	L	D	D	D	W	D	W	D	W	D	L	L	L	W	L	W	L	W	L	D
Sogdiana	L	L	L	W	D	L	W	L	D	L	D	D	W	L	W	L	D	W	L	D	W	D	L	W	W	L	W	W	L	L
Shurtan	L	L	D	L	L	L	L	L	D	W	L	D	W	L	L	L	D	L	L	D	L	D	L	L	L	L	W	L	D	D
Surkhon	L	L	L	W	L	W	D	W	L	W	L	D	L	W	D	D	D	W	L	L	D	D	L	L	L	W	L	W	D	W

Source: pfl.uz
W = Win; D = Draw; L = Loss; P = Postponed

=== Positions by round ===
Team ╲ Round	1	2	3	4	5	6	7	8	9	10	11	12	13	14	15	16	17	18	19	20	21	22	23	24	25	26	27	28	29	30
Neftchi	5	9	10	7	4	6																					1			
Nasaf	4	5	7	3	3	2																					2			
Pakhtakor	12	14	8	10	13	10																					3			
Dinamo	9	6	3	4	6	4																					4			
Bunyodkor	6	3	2	1	2	3																					5			
AGMK	3	2	1	2	1	1																					6			
Navbahor	10	4	6	9	7	7																					7			
Sogdiana	13	13	15	11	11	15																					8			
Qizilqum	1	8	12	12	12	9																								
Andijon	7	10	9	6	5	5																								
Kokand 1912	8	11	11	13	8	12																								
Surkhon	15	15	16	16	16	16	16																				12			
Mash'al	11	12	13	15	15	14																					13			
Bukhara	14	7	4	5	9	11																					14			
Khorazm	2	1	5	8	10	8																					15			
Shurtan	16	16	14	14	14	13																		16	16	16	16	16	16	

Leader and qualification to AFC Champions League Elite league stage
Qualification to AFC Champions League Two group stage
Relegation to Uzbekistan Pro League#Relegation play off
Relegation to Uzbekistan Pro League

Updated to match(es) played on 26 April 2025. Source: Uzbekistan Professional Football League

=== 2025 Uzbekistan U19 Championship under Super League results ===
Uzbekistan U19 Championship
- Season: 2025
- Champions: Nasaf U19
- Matches: 231
- Goals: 1,192 (5.16 per match)
- Top goalscorer: Lazizbek Ergashev (Nasaf, 13)
- Biggest home win: Xorazm U19 9:0 Aral U19 (16 September 2025)
- Biggest away win: Aral U19 1:9 Shoʻrtan U19 (30 August 2025)
- Highest scoring: Soʻgʻdiyona U19 8:2 Qizilqum U19 (15 August 2025)
- Highest attendance: 1142 (17 November 2025, Paxtakor U19 4:1 Nasaf U19)

The sixth season of the tournament kicked off on 16 April. This season, players born in 2006 and later were registered. Teams divided into western and eastern regions.

==== Teams ====
===== West =====
Position	Team	Game	Win	Draw	Loss	Goals for	Goals against	Goal difference	Points
1	Nasaf U19	21	16	2	2	51	17	34	50
2	Surxon U19	20	12	5	3	58	33	+25	41
3	Mash’al U19	20	10	5	5	46	26	+20	35
4	Shoʻrtan U19	20	10	4	6	51	27	+24	34
5	Soʻgʻdiyona U19	20	10	3	7	52	39	+13	33
6	Dinamo U19	20	8	6	6	33	22	+11	30
7	Buxoro U19	20	7	7	6	34	28	+6	28
8	Xorazm U19	20	7	4	9	39	43	−4	25
9	Qizilqum U19	20	6	4	10	26	38	−12	22
10	Jayxun U19	20	3	2	15	17	54	−37	11
11	Aral U19	20	0	0	20	17	97	−80	0

===== East =====
Position	Team	Game	Win	Draw	Loss	Goals for	Goals against	Goal difference	Points
1	Paxtakor U19	20	10	6	4	50	36	+14	36
2	Navbahor U19	20	11	2	7	51	36	+15	35
3	Bunyodkor U19	20	10	5	5	47	33	+14	35
4	Andijon U19	20	11	1	8	39	40	−1	34
5	Lokomotiv U19	20	9	5	6	44	30	+14	32
6	OKMK U19	20	7	8	5	43	37	+6	29
7	Olimpik MobiUz U19	20	8	4	8	41	35	+6	28
8	Olimpik U19	20	8	2	10	27	32	−5	26
9	Neftchi U19	20	4	7	9	34	47	−13	19
10	FarDU U19	20	5	3	12	20	43	−23	18
11	Qoʻqon-1912 U19	20	4	3	13	26	53	−27	15

=== 2025 Uzbekistan U21 Championship under Super League results ===
Uzbekistan U21 Championship
- Season: 2025
- Champions: Paxtakor U21
- Matches: 232
- Goals: 943 (4.06 per match)
- Top goalscorer: Navroʻzbek Iminjonov (24)
- Biggest home win: Paxtakor U21 8:0 Soʻgʻdiyona U21 (16 August 2025)
- Biggest away win: Xorazm U21 2:8 Bunyodkor U21 (17 April 2025)
- Highest scoring: OKMK U21 7:3 Qoʻqon-1912 U21 (4 October 2025)
- Highest attendance: 5152 (30 November 2025, Buxoro U21 0:1 Surxon U21)
- Lowest attendance: 25 (22 November 2025, Dinamo U21 2:1 Kokand 1912 U21)

Position	Team	Game	Win	Draw	Loss	Goals scored (GS)	Goals conceded (GO)	Head to head difference (HG)	Points
1	Paxtakor U21	30	19	5	6	69	35	34	62
2	Bunyodkor U21	30	17	4	9	79	42	37	55
3	Surxon U21	30	17	2	11	50	40	10	53
4	OKMK U21	30	14	9	7	51	33	18	51
5	Qizilqum U21	30	14	9	7	42	31	11	51
6	Navbahor U21	30	13	7	10	62	64	−2	46
7	Mash’al U21	30	13	5	12	60	58	2	44
8	Soʻgʻdiyona U21	30	12	7	11	56	53	3	43
9	Buxoro U21	30	11	8	11	37	41	−4	41
10	Dinamo U21	30	11	6	13	46	52	−6	39
11	Nasaf U21	30	10	5	15	48	60	−12	35
12	Andijon U21	30	11	1	18	54	62	−8	34
13	Xorazm U21	30	9	6	15	48	67	−19	33
14	Qoʻqon-1912 U21	30	8	5	17	48	93	−45	29
15	Shoʻrtan U21	30	7	7	16	45	54	−9	28
16	Neftchi U21	30	6	10	14	46	56	−10	28

== Season statistics ==
- First goal of the season: Khurshid Giyosov for AGMK against Bukhara (7 March 2025)

=== Goalscorers ===
As of match played 30 November 2025

Rank	Player	Team	Goals
1	(Uzbekistan) Igor Sergeev	Pakhtakor	20
2	(North Macedonia) Ljupcho Doriev	Sogdiana	16
3	(Uzbekistan) Khusayin Norchaev	Nasaf	14
4	(Uzbekistan) Khurshid Giyosov	AGMK	10
4	(Uzbekistan) Abbos Gulomov	Navbahor	10
4	(Georgia (country)) Imeda Ashortia	Bunyodkor	10
7	(Uzbekistan) Anvar Khojimirzaev	Dinamo	9
8	(Albania) Luis Kaçorri	Bunyodkor	8
8	(Uzbekistan) Temurkhuja Abdukholiqov	Bunyodkor	8
8	(Uzbekistan) Ruslanbek Jiyanov	Navbahor	8
8	(Uzbekistan) Rustam Turdimurodov	Andijon/ Surkhon	8
8	(Serbia) Dragan Ćeran	Nasaf	8
8	(Uzbekistan) Khumoyun Murtozoyev	Mash'al	8
8	(Serbia) Zoran Marušić	Neftchi	8

=== Hat-tricks ===
Player	For	Against	Result	Date
(Bosnia and Herzegovina) Dominik Begić	Bukhara	Navbahor	5–0 (H)	20 September 2025

=== Top assists ===
As of match played 30 June 2025

Rank	Player	Team	Asists
1	(Uzbekistan) Alisher Odilov	Navbahor	7
2	(Uzbekistan) Oybek Bozorov	Nasaf	6
3	(Uzbekistan) Khurshid Giyosov	AGMK	4
3	(Uzbekistan) Ruslanbek Jiyanov	Navbahor	4
3	(Uzbekistan) Anvar Khojimirzayev	Dinamo	4
3	(Uzbekistan) Asadbek Sobirjonov	AGMK	4
3	(Uzbekistan) Jamshid Iskanderov	Neftchi	4
3	(Uzbekistan) Khojiakbar Alijonov	Pakhtakor	4
9	(Kosovo) Altin Kryeziu	Andijon	3
9	(North Macedonia) Ljupcho Doriev	Sogdiana	3
9	(Uzbekistan) Sharof Mukhiddinov	Nasaf	3

=== Clean sheets ===
Rank	Player	Team	Clean sheets
1	(Uzbekistan) Ravshanbek Yagudin	Dinamo	4
1	(Uzbekistan) Azizxon Isoqov	Kokand 1912	4
1	(Uzbekistan) Abduvohid Nematov	Nasaf	4
4	(Uzbekistan) Sardor Qobiljonov	Khorazm	3
4	(Uzbekistan) Javohir Ilyosov	AGMK	3
4	(Uzbekistan) Muhammadyusuf Sobirov	Sogdiana	3
7	(Uzbekistan) Umidjon Hamroyev	Mash'al	2
7	(Brazil) Jhonatan	Pakhtakor	2
7	(Uzbekistan) Vladimir Nazarov	Pakhtakor	2
7	(Russia) Artyom Potapov	Surkhon	2
7	(Uzbekistan) Eldor Adhamov	Andijon	2

== Awards ==
=== Monthly awards ===
Month	Manager of the Month		Player of the Month		Goal of the Month	
Month	Manager	Club	Player	Club	Player	Club
March	(Uzbekistan) Mirjalol Qosimov	AGMK	(Albania) Luis Kaçorri	Bunyodkor	(Uzbekistan) Islombek Baratov	Mash'al
April	(Uzbekistan) Ruziqul Berdiev	Nasaf	(Uzbekistan) Igor Sergeev	Pakhtakor	(Brazil) Jurani Ferreira	Dinamo
May	(Uzbekistan) Kamoliddin Tadjiev	Pakhtakor	(Uzbekistan) Igor Sergeev	Pakhtakor	(Uzbekistan) Oybek Urmonjonov	Dinamo
June/July	(Uzbekistan) Ilyos Zeytulayev	Bunyodkor	(Uzbekistan) Temurkhuja Abdukholiqov	Bunyodkor	(Uzbekistan) Ikrom Alibaev	Neftchi
August	(Tajikistan) Vitaliy Levchenko	Neftchi	(Uzbekistan) Rustam Turdimurodov	Surkhon	(Uzbekistan) Khojiakbar Alijonov	Pakhtakor
September	(Uzbekistan) Ruziqul Berdiev	Nasaf	(North Macedonia) Ljupcho Doriev	Sogdiana	(North Macedonia) Ljupcho Doriev	Sogdiana
October	(Uzbekistan) Kamoliddin Tadjiev	Pakhtakor	(Uzbekistan) Igor Sergeev	Pakhtakor	(Uzbekistan) Islom Kenjabaev	Qizilqum
November	(Uzbekistan) Kamoliddin Tadjiev	Pakhtakor	(Uzbekistan) Khojiakbar Alijonov	Pakhtakor	(Uzbekistan) Khojiakbar Alijonov	Pakhtakor

=== Visits ===
As of 1 December 2025

==== By rounds ====
Uzbekistan Super League attendance by rounds
Rounds	Total	GP.	Average
1 round	29,018	8	3,627
2 round	53,110	8	6,639
3 round	31,087	8	3,886
4 round	46,716	8	5,840
5 round	50,389	8	6,299
6 round	42,450	8	5,306
7 round	33,959	8	4,245
8 round	38,902	8	4,863
9 round	51,271	8	6,409
10 round	31,786	8	3,973
11 round	50,365	8	6,296
12 round	31,060	8	3,883
13 round	49,943	8	6,243
14 round	35,563	8	4,445
15 round	41,185	8	5,148
16 round	43,537	8	5,442
17 round	38,203	8	4,775
18 round	57,297	8	7,162
19 round	54,939	8	6,867
20 round	39,573	8	4,947
21 round	32,818	8	4,102
22 round	39,600	8	4,950
23 round	26,171	8	3,271
24 round	38,898	8	4,862
25 round	39,718	8	4,965
26 round	33,961	8	4,245
27 round	31,614	8	3,952
28 round	29,668	8	3,709
29 round	42,624	8	5,328
30 round	19,174	8	2,397
Total	1,184,599	240	4,936

==== By clubs ====
The table below shows fan attendance at the clubs' home games.

Club \ Matches in home	1	2	3	4	5	6	7	8	9	10	11	12	13	14	15	Total	Average
Andijon	17000	11200	14007	9124	7900	7241	8233	11145	19965	11490	6180	6083	5281	5100	4264	144,213	9,262
Bunyodkor	3200	1210	678	1877	1273	1899	4836	631	234	826	417	1163	220	432	1260	20,156	1,344
Bukhara	1011	841	1537	171	2110	1811	589	452	453	217	6124	7350	6781	5980	5152	40,579	2,705
Dinamo Samarqand	8150	8898	13800	10800	13525	11485	11508	8156	12105	10100	4820	8027	1021	7821	8112	138,328	9,222
Mashʼal	997	499	3451	1311	1310	4125	956	1350	1850	628	677	817	718	369	653	19,711	1,314
Nasaf	6250	4653	3758	3530	9859	12476	11874	15350	12357	5119	4750	2014	3754	2253	2583	100,580	6,705
Navbahor	6822	15420	25250	5211	7366	8732	10786	10253	10211	21350	5338	4557	3265	7152	2722	144,435	9,629
Neftchi	10250	14552	15500	6500	4240	8512	9200	15240	14502	11935	10825	15201	15111	13509	18867	183,944	12,262
OKMK	2017	4812	3815	1315	6505	8315	1100	1415	1326	1012	1415	1032	2230	1415	1002	38,726	2,582
Pakhtakor	3500	4001	7250	2345	4100	3517	1718	5353	3798	2288	7950	3200	2152	2557	6450	60,179	4,012
Qizilqum	385	450	255	10987	7533	3850	2812	3700	4650	3851	3544	3201	4680	3150	2158	55,206	3,680
Kokand 1912	6000	4005	3211	3250	4701	4150	3100	2800	4900	2550	1650	2450	3550	8571	2550	57,438	3,829
Sogdiana	4506	2850	2810	1010	1390	1050	1254	3471	1191	5080	4215	2230	1410	750	479	33,696	2,246
Surkhon	6784	6154	8457	8954	2814	3372	2421	1870	3244	4314	2420	3241	4714	3117	2814	64,690	4,313
Khorazm	343	852	845	792	864	179	2155	825	203	12078	7225	5240	9875	4750	1747	47,973	3,198
Shurtan	543	3454	587	3648	4186	2986	2260	1853	4511	1674	1867	2470	1911	1156	985	34,091	2,273

== See also ==
- 2025 Uzbekistan Pro League
- 2025 Uzbekistan Cup
- 2025 Uzbekistan Super Cup
