= Uzbek football clubs in Asian competitions =

Since 1967, Malaysian football clubs have actively participated in prestigious Asian association football competitions organized by the Asian Football Confederation, including the AFC Champions League, the Asian Cup Winners' Cup, and the AFC Cup.

== Background ==
Selangor was the first Malaysian club to participate in Asian football competitions, making their debut in the 1967 Asian Champion Club Tournament. They achieved an impressive result, finishing as runners-up after a narrow 2–1 loss to Hapoel Tel Aviv (Israel) in the final.

In 2015, Johor Darul Ta'zim made history by becoming the first Malaysian club to win the continental club championship through the AFC Cup. Their remarkable journey culminated in a 1–0 victory against Istiklol (Tajikistan) in the final, marking a significant milestone for Malaysian football on the Asian stage.

== Games by club ==
Match won	Match drawn	Match lost

=== AGMK ===
AGMK results
Season	Round	Result	Opponent	Venue
2019 AFC Champions League	Preliminary Round 2	4–2	[TJK] Istiklol	AGMK Stadium, Olmaliq
2019 AFC Champions League	Play-Off Round	0–4	[KSA] Al-Nassr	Prince Faisal bin Fahd Stadium, Riyadh
2021 AFC Champions League	Play-Off Round	1–0	[QAT] Al-Gharafa	Suheim bin Hamad Stadium, Doha
2021 AFC Champions League	Group Stage	2–2	[KSA] Al-Hilal	Prince Faisal bin Fahd Stadium, Riyadh
2021 AFC Champions League	Group Stage	2–3	[TJK] Istiklol	King Fahd International Stadium, Riyadh
2021 AFC Champions League	Group Stage	2–1	[UAE] Shabab al-Ahli	King Fahd International Stadium, Riyadh
2021 AFC Champions League	Group Stage	1–3	[UAE] Shabab al-Ahli	King Fahd International Stadium, Riyadh
2021 AFC Champions League	Group Stage	0–3	[KSA] Al-Hilal	Prince Faisal bin Fahd Stadium, Riyadh
2021 AFC Champions League	Group Stage	2–1	[TJK] Istiklol	King Fahd International Stadium, Riyadh
2023–24 AFC Champions League	Preliminary Round	1–0	[OMA] Al-Seeb	AGMK Stadium, Olmaliq
2023–24 AFC Champions League	Play-Off Round	1–0	[QAT] Al-Arabi	Al Thumama Stadium, Doha
2023–24 AFC Champions League	Group Stage	0–3	[KSA] Al-Ittihad	Prince Abdullah Al Faisal Stadium, Jeddah
2023–24 AFC Champions League	Group Stage	1–2	[IRQ] Al-Quwa Al-Jawiya	AGMK Stadium, Olmaliq
2023–24 AFC Champions League	Group Stage	1–3	[IRN] Sepahan	AGMK Stadium, Olmaliq
2023–24 AFC Champions League	Group Stage	0–9	[IRN] Sepahan	Azadi Stadium, Tehran
2023–24 AFC Champions League	Group Stage	1–2	[KSA] Al-Ittihad	AGMK Stadium, Olmaliq
2023–24 AFC Champions League	Group Stage	2–3	[IRQ] Al-Quwa Al-Jawiya	Franso Hariri Stadium, Erbil

=== Andijon ===
Andijon results
Season	Round	Result	Opponent	Venue
2025–26 AFC Champions League Two	Group Stage	0–0	[TKM] Arkadag	Arkadag Stadium, Arkadag
2025–26 AFC Champions League Two	Group Stage	0–0	[QAT] Al-Ahli	Bobur Arena, Andijan
2025–26 AFC Champions League Two	Group Stage	0–0	[BHR] Al-Khaldiya	Bobur Arena, Andijan
2025–26 AFC Champions League Two	Group Stage	0–0	[BHR] Al-Khaldiya	Al Muharraq Stadium, Arad
2025–26 AFC Champions League Two	Group Stage	1–1	[TKM] Arkadag	Bobur Arena, Andijan
2025–26 AFC Champions League Two	Group Stage	0–2	[QAT] Al-Ahli	Al Thumama Stadium, Doha

=== Dinamo Samarqand ===
Dinamo Samarqand results
Season	Round	Result	Opponent	Venue
2000–01 Asian Cup Winners' Cup	First Round	3–4	(Turkmenistan) Nebitçi Balkanabat	Sport toplumy, Balkanabat
2000–01 Asian Cup Winners' Cup	First Round	2–3	(Turkmenistan) Nebitçi Balkanabat	Dinamo Stadium, Samarqand

=== Dustlik ===
FC Dustlik results
Season	Round	Result	Opponent	Venue
2000–01 Asian Club Championship	First Round	w/o	(Tajikistan) Varzob Dushanbe	—

=== Lokomotiv Tashkent ===
Lokomotiv Tashkent results
Season	Round	Result	Opponent	Venue
2013 AFC Champions League	Qualifying play-off	2–3	(United Arab Emirates) Al-Nasr	Al-Maktoum Stadium, Dubai
2014 AFC Champions League	Qualifying play-off	1–3	Al-Kuwait	Pakhtakor Markaziy Stadium, Tashkent
2015 AFC Champions League	Group stage	1–3	(Saudi Arabia) Al-Hilal	King Fahd International Stadium, Riyadh
2015 AFC Champions League	Group stage	1–1	(Iran) Foolad	Lokomotiv Stadium, Tashkent
2015 AFC Champions League	Group stage	2–6	(Qatar) Al-Sadd	Jassim bin Hamad Stadium, Doha
2015 AFC Champions League	Group stage	5–0	(Qatar) Al-Sadd	Lokomotiv Stadium, Tashkent
2015 AFC Champions League	Group stage	1–2	(Saudi Arabia) Al-Hilal	Lokomotiv Stadium, Tashkent
2015 AFC Champions League	Group stage	0–1	(Iran) Foolad	Ghadir Stadium, Ahvaz
2016 AFC Champions League	Group stage	1–1	(Saudi Arabia) Al-Ittihad	Lokomotiv Stadium, Tashkent
2016 AFC Champions League	Group stage	1–1	(Saudi Arabia) Al-Ittihad	King Abdullah Sports City, Jeddah
2016 AFC Champions League	Group stage	2–0	(Iran) Sepahan	Foolad Shahr Stadium, Isfahan
2016 AFC Champions League	Group stage	1–0	(Iran) Sepahan	Lokomotiv Stadium, Tashkent
2016 AFC Champions League	Group stage	1–1	(United Arab Emirates) Al-Nasr	Al-Maktoum Stadium, Dubai
2016 AFC Champions League	Group stage	0–0	(United Arab Emirates) Al-Nasr	Bunyodkor Stadium, Tashkent
2016 AFC Champions League	Round of 16	0–0	(Saudi Arabia) Al-Hilal	King Fahd International Stadium, Riyadh
2016 AFC Champions League	Round of 16	2–1	(Saudi Arabia) Al-Hilal	Bunyodkor Stadium, Tashkent
2016 AFC Champions League	Quarter-finals	0–0	(United Arab Emirates) Al-Ain	Hazza bin Zayed Stadium, Al Ain
2016 AFC Champions League	Quarter-finals	0–1	(United Arab Emirates) Al-Ain	Bunyodkor Stadium, Tashkent
2017 AFC Champions League	Group stage	0–1	(Saudi Arabia) Al-Taawoun	King Abdullah Sport City Stadium, Buraidah
2017 AFC Champions League	Group stage	2–0	(United Arab Emirates) Al-Ahli	Lokomotiv Stadium, Tashkent
2017 AFC Champions League	Group stage	0–2	(Iran) Esteghlal	Azadi Stadium, Tehran
2017 AFC Champions League	Group stage	1–1	(Iran) Esteghlal	Lokomotiv Stadium, Tashkent
2017 AFC Champions League	Group stage	4–4	(Saudi Arabia) Al-Taawoun	Lokomotiv Stadium, Tashkent
2017 AFC Champions League	Group stage	0–4	(United Arab Emirates) Al-Ahli	Al-Rashid Stadium, Dubai
2018 AFC Champions League	Group stage	5–0	(United Arab Emirates) Al-Wahda	Lokomotiv Stadium, Tashkent
2018 AFC Champions League	Group stage	0–2	(Iran) Zob Ahan	Foolad Shahr Stadium, Isfahan
2018 AFC Champions League	Group stage	2–3	(Qatar) Al-Duhail	Abdullah bin Khalifa Stadium, Doha
2018 AFC Champions League	Group stage	1–2	(Qatar) Al-Duhail	Lokomotiv Stadium, Tashkent
2018 AFC Champions League	Group stage	4–1	(United Arab Emirates) Al-Wahda	Zayed Sports City Stadium, Abu Dhabi
2018 AFC Champions League	Group stage	1–1	(Iran) Zob Ahan	Lokomotiv Stadium, Tashkent
2019 AFC Champions League	Group stage	2–0	(United Arab Emirates) Al-Wahda	Lokomotiv Stadium, Tashkent
2019 AFC Champions League	Group stage	1–2	(Qatar) Al-Rayyan	Jassim bin Hamad Stadium, Al Rayyan
2019 AFC Champions League	Group stage	2–3	(Saudi Arabia) Al-Ittihad	King Abdullah Sports City, Jeddah
2019 AFC Champions League	Group stage	1–1	(Saudi Arabia) Al-Ittihad	Lokomotiv Stadium, Tashkent
2019 AFC Champions League	Group stage	1–3	(United Arab Emirates) Al-Wahda	Al Nahyan Stadium, Abu Dhabi
2019 AFC Champions League	Group stage	3–2	(Qatar) Al-Rayyan	Lokomotiv Stadium, Tashkent
2020 AFC Champions League	Preliminary round 2	0–1	(Tajikistan) Istiklol	Lokomotiv Stadium, Tashkent

=== Mash'al Mubarek ===
Mash'al results
Season	Round	Result	Opponent	Venue
2006 AFC Champions League	Group Stage	1–0	(Iraq) Al-Minaa	Sabah Al-Salem Stadium, Kuwait City
2006 AFC Champions League	Group Stage	1–1	(United Arab Emirates) Al Ain	Markaziy Stadium, Karshi
2006 AFC Champions League	Group Stage	0–5	(Saudi Arabia) Al-Hilal	King Fahd II Stadium, Riyadh
2006 AFC Champions League	Group Stage	2–1	(Saudi Arabia) Al-Hilal	Markaziy Stadium, Karshi
2006 AFC Champions League	Group Stage	2–2	(Iraq) Al-Minaa	Markaziy Stadium, Karshi
2006 AFC Champions League	Group Stage	1–2	(United Arab Emirates) Al Ain	Tahnoun bin Mohammed Stadium, Al Ain
