= 2025 Uzbekistan Super Cup =

- Event: Uzbekistan Super Cup
Nasaf	Andijon
(Uzbekistan)	(Uzbekistan)
1	0
- Date: 19:30, May 27, 2025
- Venue: Bunyodkor Stadium, Tashkent
- Referee: Ilgiz Tantashev
- Attendance: 13,205
- Weather: Rainy; 15 °C (58 °F); 75% humidity

2025 Uzbekistan Super Cup (Uzbek: Футбол бўйича 2025-йилги Ўзбекистон Суперкубоги) was the 10th edition of the Uzbekistan Super Cup, an annual football match contested between the winners of the previous season's Super League and Cup. It was played between the 2024 Uzbekistan Cup winner – Andijon, and the 2024 Uzbekistan Super League champion – Nasaf.

Nasaf played in the Super Cup for the 6th time in its history and won the trophy for the 4th time. Andijon participated in the Super Cup for the first time in its history.

== Host and officials ==
On 8 April, the Bunyodkor Stadium in Tashkent was chosen as a neutral venue for both teams. The match was scheduled for 27 May, and Ilgiz Tantashev was appointed as the main referee.

== Match details ==
May 27, 2025
19:30 UZT (UTC+5)

Nasaf	1—0	Andijon
Norchaev 72' (pen.)	Match report

Bunyodkor Stadium, Tashkent
Referee: Ilgiz Tantashev (Uzbekistan)

Nasaf
Players
35	(Uzbekistan) Abduvohid Nematov
2	(Uzbekistan) Alibek Davronov
5	(Uzbekistan) Golib Gaybullaev
35	(Uzbekistan) Akmal Mozgovoy	(yellow card) 31'
10	(Serbia) Dragan Ćeran	(yellow card) 90'	(substituted off) 92'
14	(Uzbekistan) Sharof Mukhiddinov	(substituted off) 64'
18	(Uzbekistan) Khusain Norchaev	72' (pen.)
19	(Serbia) Stefan Čolović	(substituted off) 64'
28	(Uzbekistan) Shukhrat Mukhammadiev	(substituted off) 92'
77	(Uzbekistan) Oybek Bozorov
92	(Uzbekistan) Umar Eshmurodov
Substitutions:
1	(Ukraine) Oleksandr Vorobey
6	(Uzbekistan) Murodbek Rakhmatov
8	(Uzbekistan) Zafarmurod Abdurakhmatov	(substituted on) 92'
9	(Uzbekistan) Javokhir Sidikov
17	(Uzbekistan) Suhrob Nurulloyev
22	(Russia) Igor Golban	(substituted on) 92'
24	(Uzbekistan) Sardorbek Bakhromov
34	(Uzbekistan) Sherzod Nasrullaev	(substituted on) 64'
34	(Albania) Rubin Hebaj	(substituted on) 64'
Coach:
(Uzbekistan) Ruziqul Berdiev

Andijon
Players
25	(Uzbekistan) Valijon Rahimov
4	(Uzbekistan) Islam Mamatkazin
5	(Uzbekistan) Abduvohid Gulomov	(yellow card) 79'
35	(Slovenia) Altin Kryeziu	(substituted off) 73'
10	(Uzbekistan) Ilkhom Abduganiev	(substituted off) 73'
11	(Russia) Islam Mashukov	(substituted off) 73'
22	(Uzbekistan) Usmonali Ismonaliev	(yellow card) 71'
23	(Uzbekistan) Doniyor Abdumannopov
26	(Uzbekistan) Muhammadkarim Toirov
32	(Montenegro) Luka Uskoković
92	(Uzbekistan) Bektemir Abdumannonov
Substitutions:
1	(Uzbekistan) Eldor Adkhamov
2	(Uzbekistan) Abubakir Ashurov
7	(Uzbekistan) Rustam Turdimurodov	(substituted on) 73'
8	(Uzbekistan) Iskandar Shayqulov
9	(Bosnia and Herzegovina) Mirzad Mehanović	(substituted on) 73'
13	(Uzbekistan) Sardor Azimov
14	(Uzbekistan) Abdurakhmon Kamilov
18	(Uzbekistan) Damir Temirov	(substituted on) 73'
21	(Uzbekistan) Asadbek Khabibullaev
Coach:
(Uzbekistan) Maksim Shatskikh

Assistant referees:
Andrey Sapenko
Timur Gaynullin
Fourth official:
Abdurashid Khudoyberganov
Video assistant referee:
Asker Najafaliev
Assistant VAR:
Bakhtiyorkhoja Shavkatov

Match rules

- 90 minutes.
- If scores are level, no extra time will be played; a penalty shoot-out will determine the winner.
- Seven substitutes.
- A maximum of five substitutions allowed.
