= Usmon Toshev =

Uzbekistani footballer and coach (1965)

Personal information
- Date of birth: 23 September 1965
- Place of birth: Bukhara, Uzbek SSR, USSR
- Height: 1.82 m (6 ft 0 in)
- Position: Midfielder

Senior career*
Years	Team	Apps	(Gls)
1985–1987	Zarafshon	52	(2)
1988	Pakhtakor Tashkent	12	(0)
1989–1991	Nurafshon Buxoro	7	(14)
1992	Atommash	8	(0)
1992	Nurafshon Buxoro	11	(0)
1992–1993	Szolnok	28	(2)
1994–1998	Bukhara	114	(10)
1998	Keratsini	16	(1)
1999	Bukhara	29	(1)

International career
1994	Uzbekistan	2	(0)

Managerial career
- 2000–2008: Bukhara
- 2006: Uzbekistan (assistant)
- 2008: Nasaf (interim)
- 2008: Shurtan
- 2009–2011: Spartak Tashkent
- 2011: Nasaf (director)
- 2012: Nasaf
- 2009–2011: Spartak Bukhara
- 2014–2015: De Maiwand Atalan
- 2017: Andijan
- 2018: Uzbekistan (U-17)
- 2018–2021: Tajikistan
- 2018–2021: Tajikistan (U-23)
- 2021–2024: Bukhara
- 2024–2025: Afghanistan
- * Club domestic league appearances and goals

Usmon Qudratovich Toshev (23 September 1965, Bukhara, Uzbek SSR) is an Uzbekistani professional football coach and player. From November 2018 he was the head coach of Bukhara, which competes in the Uzbekistan Super League. From October 2024, until his resignation on May 11, 2025, he was the head coach of the Afghanistan national football team. He's also been the head of the National Teams Department in the Uzbekistan Football Association.

== Club career ==
Toshev played for the youth team of the Bukhara "Yoshkuch". From 1985 to 1987, he played for Zarafshon. In 1987 he graduated from Bukhara University with a degree in sports education. In 1988, he played for the Pakhtakor Tashkent. From 1989 to 1991, he played for Nurafshon Buxoro.

In 1992, he played for Russian side Atommash from Volgodonsk. In the same year, he also played Nurafshon Buxoro again. In 1992–93 he played for Hungarian club Szolnok. From 1994 to 1998 he was a player at Bukhara. In 1998, he also played for Greek club Keratsini. In 1999 he completed his playing career at Bukhara.

== International career ==
In 1994 Toshev made two appearances for the Uzbekistan national team, in matches against teams of Tajikistan and Kyrgyzstan.

== Managerial career ==
After completing his career as a footballer, in 2000 he was appointed head coach of the "Bukhara", which he headed until 2008. Under the leadership of Toshev, "Bukhara" was one of the "middle peasants" in the Highest League of Uzbekistan. In 2002, in parallel, he was the head coach of the national team of the Bukhara Region in football in the national student games "Universiade 2002", which took place in Bukhara, and in which the national team of the Bukhara region became the champion.

In 2005 he received a coaching license PRO. In 2006, he worked for a while at the coaching staff of the national team of Uzbekistan under the leadership of Russian coach Valery Nepomnyashchy. In 2008 he was temporarily the head coach of the "Nasaf". In 2009, he headed the "Shurtan".

In 2009–2011 he was the head coach of the "Spartak Tashkent". In 2011, he worked as a manager and sports director at "Nasaf", and from May to November 2012 he headed this club. In 2013, he headed the "Spartak Bukhara".

In 2014–2015, he was the head coach of the Afghan club De Maiwand Atalan, which participates in the Afghan Premier League. In 2017, he headed the "Andijan" club, which then participated in the First League of Uzbekistan, and at the end of the season, took 3rd place in this league.

In 2018, for some time he headed the junior national team of Uzbekistan under 16 years old, with which he won the youth tournament of the CAFA. In the second half of 2018, he headed the Afghan club Tufan Herirud, with which he won the Afghan Premier League 2018.

=== Tajikistan ===
On 15 November 2018, Toshev was appointed manager of the Tajikistan national under-23 football team, and several days later, in parallel, he was appointed the head coach of Tajikistan. On 18 June 2021 Toshev resigned as Tajikistan National Football coach.

=== Afghanistan ===
Until autumn 2024, he worked as the head of the national team department of the Uzbekistan Football Association. In October 2024, Usmon Toshev began working as the head coach of the Afghanistan national football team. At a press conference in Kabul, it was reported that a contract with the Uzbek specialist was signed for a period of one year.

== Career statistics ==
Appearances and goals by national team and year
National team	Year	Apps	Goals
Uzbekistan	1994	2	0
Total		2	0

== Managerial statistics ==
As of match played 15 June 2021

Managerial record by team and tenure
Team	From	To	Record					Ref.
Team	From	To	P	W	D	L	Win %	Ref.
FC Nasaf	1 January 2008	31 December 2008	30	10	5	15	33.3	
FC Shurtan Guzar	1 January 2009	30 June 2009	16	5	3	8	31.3	
FC Nasaf	1 January 2011	31 December 2012	79	42	20	17	53.2	
Tajikistan	15 November 2018	18 June 2021	22	6	4	12	27.3	
Total			147	63	32	52	42.9	—
