= Luis Kaçorri =

Albanian football player

Personal information
- Date of birth: 24 February 1998 (age 28)
- Place of birth: Ronciglione, Italy
- Height: 1.94 m (6 ft 4 in)
- Position: Forward

Team information
- Current team: Chelyabinsk
- Number: 74

Youth career
- 2013–2014: Olimpia Colligiana

Senior career*
Years	Team	Apps	(Gls)
2015–2016	Montemurlo Giovanili	2	(0)
2016–2017	Jolly Montemurlo	17	(2)
2017–2018	Igea Virtus	33	(8)
2018	Carpi	0	(0)
2018	Fermana	2	(0)
2019	Fiorenzuola	17	(3)
2019	Ligorna 1922	13	(4)
2019–2020	Cittanova Calcio	12	(4)
2020	Correggese Calcio	1	(0)
2020	Savoia	9	(0)
2021–2022	Arzachena Smerelda	55	(10)
2022–2023	Bylis	34	(5)
2023–2024	Dinamo City	33	(9)
2024–2025	Bunyodkor	30	(12)
2025–2026	Al-Hussein	9	(5)
2026–	Chelyabinsk	0	(0)
- * Club domestic league appearances and goals as of 8 May 2026

Luis Kaçorri (born 24 February 1998) is an Albanian professional footballer who plays as a forward for Russian First League club Chelyabinsk.

== Career ==
Before the start of the second round, Bunyodkor signs Albanian striker Luis Kaçorri. As we have learned, the 26-year-old footballer is already in Tashkent and the parties will sign a contract today.

Caçorri signed a contract with Bunyodkor until the end of 2024.

== Honours ==
Individual

- Uzbekistan Super League Player of the Month: March 2025
