= Imeda Ashortia =

Georgian footballer

Personal information
- Full name: Imeda Ashortia; Georgian: იმედა აშორტია
- Date of birth: 30 October 1996 (age 30)
- Place of birth: Martvili, Georgia
- Height: 1.83 m (6 ft 0 in)
- Position: Forward

Team information
- Current team: Andijan
- Number: 9

Senior career*
Years	Team	Apps	(Gls)
2013-2016	Merani Martvili	30	(1)
2017-2018	Dila Gori	12	(0)
2018	Kolkheti-1913 Poti	16	(1)
2019	Tskhinvali	11	(2)
2020	Shukura Kobuleti	13	(2)
2021-2022	Telavi	48	(5)
2022	Turan Tovuz	13	(0)
2023	Telavi	30	(6)
2024	Shakhter Karagandy	24	(4)
2025	Bunyodkor	30	(10)
2026-	Andijan	11	(1)
- * Club domestic league appearances and goals as of 29 July 2026

Imeda Ashortia (Georgian: იმედა აშორტია; born 30 October 1996 in Martvili, Samegrelo-Upper Svaneti, Georgia) is a Georgian professional footballer who plays as a forward for the Uzbekistan Super League club Andijan.

== Career ==
Ashortia began his football career at Merani Martvili. He made his debut on 6 October 2013 in the Georgian championship against Torpedo Kutaisi. On 1 July 2017, he transferred to the Georgian club Dila. On 1 January 2021, he signed a contract with the Georgian club Telavi. On 1 July 2022, he signed with the Azerbaijani club Turan. On 8 August 2022, he made his debut in the Azerbaijan Premier League in a match against Gabala.

== Career statistics ==
Club	Season	League			National Cup		International		Other		Total	
Club	Season	Division	Apps	Goals	Apps	Goals	Apps	Goals	Apps	Goals	Apps	Goals
Telavi	2021	Erovuli Liga	28	2	2	0	-		-		1	0
Telavi	2022	Erovuli Liga	20	3								
-		-		17	1							
Turan	2022/23	Azerbaijan Premier League	13	0	2	0	-		-		35	3
Telavi	2023	Erovuli Liga	30	6	2	0	-		-		39	8
Telavi	Total		141	24	26	5	29	4	2	0	202	35
