= Altin Kryeziu =

Slovenian-Kosovan footballer

Personal information
- Date of birth: 3 January 2002 (age 24)
- Place of birth: Kranj, Slovenia
- Height: 1.84 m (6 ft 0 in)
- Position: Midfielder

Team information
- Current team: Egnatia
- Number: 23

Youth career
- 2011–2019: Triglav Kranj
- 2019–2020: SPAL
- 2020–2021: Torino

Senior career*
Years	Team	Apps	(Gls)
2019–2020	SPAL	0	(0)
2020–2022	Torino	0	(0)
2021–2022	→ Virton (loan)	14	(0)
2022	→ Tabor Sežana (loan)	7	(0)
2022–2023	Maribor	4	(0)
2023–2024	Laçi	46	(1)
2025	Andijon	15	(1)
2025–	Egnatia	30	(0)

International career^{‡}
2018	Slovenia U17	3	(0)
2019	Kosovo U17	2	(0)
2020–2021	Kosovo U21	7	(0)
- * Club domestic league appearances and goals as of 25 June 2026 ‡ National team caps and goals as of 17 November 2021

Altin Kryeziu (born 3 January 2002) is a professional footballer who plays as a midfielder for Kategoria Superiore club Egnatia. Born in Slovenia, he represented both Slovenia and Kosovo internationally.

== Club career ==
=== Early career and SPAL ===
Kryeziu was born and raised in Kranj, Slovenia, where he started playing football at Triglav Kranj. In 2019, he was transferred to Serie A club SPAL. On 27 October 2019, he was named as a first team substitute for the first time in a league match against Napoli.

=== Torino ===
On 25 September 2020, Kryeziu joined Serie A side Torino. Two days later, he made his debut for the youth team in a 1–0 home defeat against Sassuolo after coming on as a substitute. On 22 November 2020, he was an unused substitute in Torino's Serie A game against Internazionale.

==== Loan at Virton ====
In August 2021, Kryeziu was sent on a season-long loan to Belgian First Division B side Virton. Two days after joining, he made his debut in a 2–0 away defeat against Lierse Kempenzonen after being named in the starting line-up.

==== Loan at Tabor Sežana ====
On 10 February 2022, Kryeziu joined Slovenian PrvaLiga side Tabor Sežana on loan for the remainder of the 2021–22 season.

=== Maribor ===
On 12 October 2022, Kryeziu signed for reigning Slovenian champions Maribor until the end of the 2023–24 season.

== International career ==
=== Slovenia ===
On 23 August 2018, Kryeziu received a call-up from Slovenia U17 for the friendly matches against Switzerland U17. Five days later, he made his debut with Slovenia U17 in the first friendly match against Switzerland U17 after coming on as a 57th minute substitute in place of Jan Majcen.

=== Kosovo ===
On 29 August 2020, Kryeziu received a call-up from Kosovo U21 for the 2021 UEFA European Under-21 Championship qualification match against England U21, and made his debut after being named in the starting line-up.
