= Aleksandr Khomyakov =

Russian football manager

Personal information
- Full name: Aleksandr Andreyevich Khomyakov
- Date of birth: March 5, 1969 (age 57)
- Place of birth: Soviet Union
- Height: 1.89 m (6 ft 2 in)
- Position: Goalkeeper

Team information
- Current team: Bukhara (head coach)

Senior career*
Years	Team	Apps	(Gls)
1987	Dinamo Makhachkala	5	(-)
1990	Dinamo Makhachkala	8	(-)
1990	Dagdizel Kaspiysk	-	(-)
1991	Sokol Saratov	15	(-)
1992	Sokol Saratov	-	(-)
1992-1995	Energiya Volzhsky	48	(-)
1996	Spartak Nalchik	11	(-)
1997	Energiya Volzhsky	11	(-)
1998-1999	Diana Volzhsk	63	(-)
1999-2000	Qarabağ FK	7	(-)
2000	Salyut Saratov	12	(-)
2001	Okzhetpes	6	(-)
2003	Spartak Yoshkar-Ola	32	(-)
2004-2007	Energiya Volzhsky	15	(-)

Managerial career
- 2010-2012: Mash'al Academy
- 2013-2019: Mash'al
- 2019-2020: Andijon
- 2020: Bukhara (assistant)
- 2021-2022: Mash'al
- 2023-2025: Andijan
- 2025-: Bukhara
- * Club domestic league appearances and goals

Aleksandr Andreyevich Khomyakov (Russian: Александр Андреевич Хомяков; born 5 March 1969) is a Soviet and Russian former professional footballer who played as a goalkeeper. He is currently the head coach of the Uzbekistan Super League club Bukhara.

== Playing career ==
Khomyakov is a graduate of the youth sports school in Kaspiysk. He began his professional career in 1987 with Dinamo Makhachkala. In 1991, he joined Sokol Saratov. From 1992 to 1995, played for Energiya Volzhsky. Later represented Spartak Nalchik, Diana Volzhsk and Salyut Saratov. In 2001, moved to Kazakhstan and played for Okzhetpes, conceding 15 goals in 6 matches, and soon left the club. In 2003, played for Spartak Yoshkar-Ola. He finished his career at Energiya Volzhsky.

== Coaching career ==
Khomyakov began his coaching career in Uzbekistan with Mash'al Academy in Mubarek, working with youth players. In the 2011 season, he was appointed head coach of the academy's main team.

At the beginning of the 2013 season, following his success with the academy, he was appointed head coach of Mash'al.

In 2014, he obtained the AFC Pro coaching license. He managed Mash'al until 2019.

During the second half of the 2019 season, he signed with Andijan as head coach, but was dismissed at the start of the 2020 season.

After a two-year break, he returned to Mash'al as head coach, leaving the post at his own request at the beginning of the 2022 season.

In 2022, he worked as an assistant to Viktor Kumikov at Andijan. At the start of the 2023 season, after Kumikov left the club following an offer from Kazakhstan, Khomyakov was appointed head coach of Andijan.

Under his leadership, Andijan defeated Navbahor 3–2 in the 2024 Uzbekistan Cup final on 5 October 2024, winning the club's first trophy in its history.

Following five consecutive defeats in the 2025 Uzbekistan Super League season, he left his position at Andijan.

Since 2025, he has been the head coach of Bukhara.

== Honours ==
=== As a manager ===
Mash'al

- Uzbekistan First League champion: 2013
- Uzbekistan Pro League runner-up: 2018
- Uzbekistan PFL Cup winner: 2014
- Uzbekistan Cup runner-up: 2015

Andijan

- Uzbekistan Cup winner: 2024

Bukhara

- Uzbekistan Cup runner-up: 2025
