= Alen Mašović =

Serbian footballer

Personal information
- Date of birth: 7 August 1994 (age 32)
- Place of birth: Novi Pazar, FR Yugoslavia
- Height: 1.87 m (6 ft 2 in)
- Positions: Forward; left wing

Team information
- Current team: Voždovac

Youth career
- OFK AS Novi Pazar
- –2012: Partizan
- 2012–2013: Borac Čačak

Senior career*
Years	Team	Apps	(Gls)
2013–2015	Borac Čačak	29	(1)
2015–2016	Voždovac	24	(2)
2016–2017	Čukarički	7	(0)
2017–2020	Voždovac	71	(13)
2020–2021	Machida Zelvia	28	(1)
2021–2022	Voždovac	28	(2)
2022	Nasaf	5	(1)
2023–2024	Tuzla City	18	(5)
2024	Dečić	13	(2)
2025	Qizilqum	11	(3)
2025-	Voždovac	0	(0)

International career^{‡}
2015	Serbia U-23	1	(1)
- * Club domestic league appearances and goals as of 5 August 2025 ‡ National team caps and goals as of 5 August 2025

Alen Mašović (Serbian Cyrillic: Ален Машовић; born 7 August 1994) is a Serbian footballer who plays as a forward for Voždovac.

== Club career ==
Born in Novi Pazar, he played in the youth teams of FK Partizan before coming to Borac Čačak.

On 21 July 2015, he signed with Voždovac.

On 4 August 2021, he returned to Voždovac.

In January 2025, Alen Mašović joined Qizilqum from FK Dečić as a free agent. During the 2025 season, he played 11 matches in the Uzbekistan Super League, scoring 3 goals, and made 1 appearance in the Uzbekistan Cup, in which he scored once. In total, he played 12 official matches and scored 4 goals for the club. In July 2025, he left Qizilqum to join Voždovac as a free agent.

On 5 August 2025, he returned to Voždovac.
