= Luka Uskoković =

Montenegrin footballer (born 1996)

Personal information
- Date of birth: 10 April 1996 (age 30)
- Height: 1.93 m (6 ft 4 in)
- Position: Defender

Team information
- Current team: Mladost DG
- Number: 4

Youth career
- Budućnost Podgorica
- 2014–2015: Maribor

Senior career*
Years	Team	Apps	(Gls)
2014–2021	Maribor	25	(1)
2015–2017	Maribor B	15	(0)
2016	→ Zarica (loan)	10	(1)
2021–2024	Maribor	36	(0)
2024–2025	Liepāja	6	(0)
2025	Andijon	5	(2)
2025–	Mladost DG	34	(1)

International career
2015	Montenegro U19 (Note: Official competitive UEFA matches only.)	2	(0)
2018	Montenegro U21	2	(1)
- * Club domestic league appearances and goals as of 17 June 2026

Luka Uskoković (born 10 April 1996) is a Montenegrin footballer who plays as a defender for Mladost DG.

== Career ==
Uskoković started his career with Budućnost Podgorica. In 2014, he signed for Slovenian club Maribor, where he made 28 appearances and scored one goal in all competitions before his contract expired in the summer of 2021. After failing to find a new club for several months, he re-signed with Maribor in November 2021.
