= AGMK Stadium =

Football stadium in Uzbekistan

Coordinates: 40°50′44″N 69°36′00″E

- Metallurg Stadioni
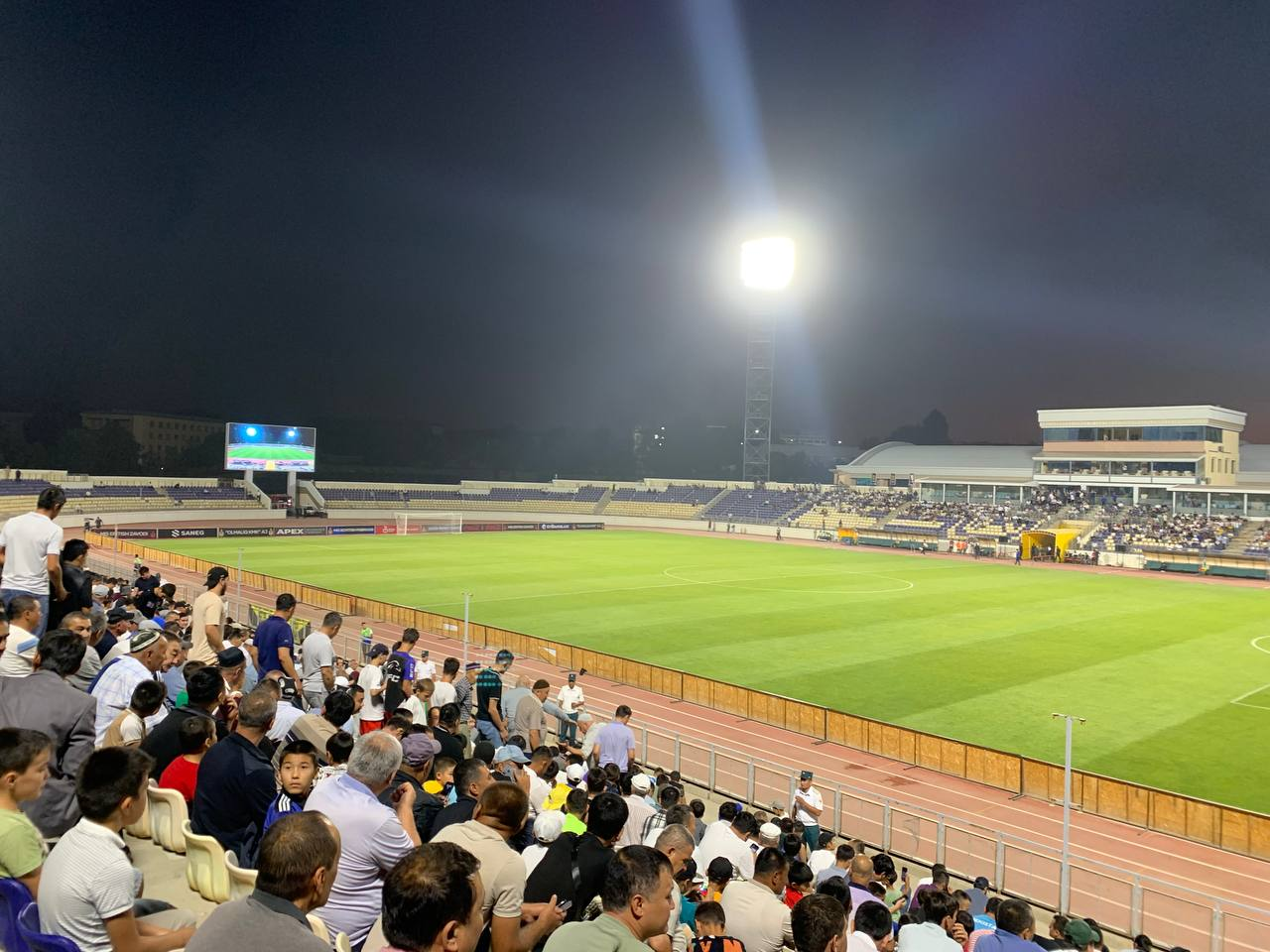
- Interactive map of AGMK Stadium
- Full name: AGMK Stadium
- Location: Olmaliq, Uzbekistan
- Capacity: 12,000

Tenant
- FC AGMK

AGMK Stadium is a multi-use stadium in Olmaliq, Uzbekistan. It is currently used mostly for football matches, on club level by FC AGMK of the Uzbekistan Super League. The stadium has a capacity of 12,000 spectators.
