= Doniyor Abdumannopov =

Uzbekistani professional footballer

Personal information
- Date of birth: 12 October 2000 (age 26)
- Place of birth: Marhamat, Uzbekistan
- Height: 1.79 m (5 ft 10 in)
- Position: Midfielder

Team information
- Current team: Andijon
- Number: 33

Senior career*
Years	Team	Apps	(Gls)
2019–2021	Andijon	28	(3)
2021	→ Energetik-BGU Minsk (loan)	1	(0)
2022	Sogdiana Jizzakh	11	(4)
2022	Navbahor Namangan	12	(1)
2023	Bunyodkor	13	(1)
2023	Navbahor Namangan	10	(1)
2024	Pakhtakor	17	(4)
2025–	Andijon	38	(6)
- * Club domestic league appearances and goals as of 29 July 2026

Doniyor Abdumannopov (born 12 October 2000) is an Uzbekistani professional footballer who plays for Andijon.
