= Bobur Arena =

Stadium in Uzbekistan

Coordinates: 40°48′49″N 72°19′46″E

Soghlom Avlod Stadium
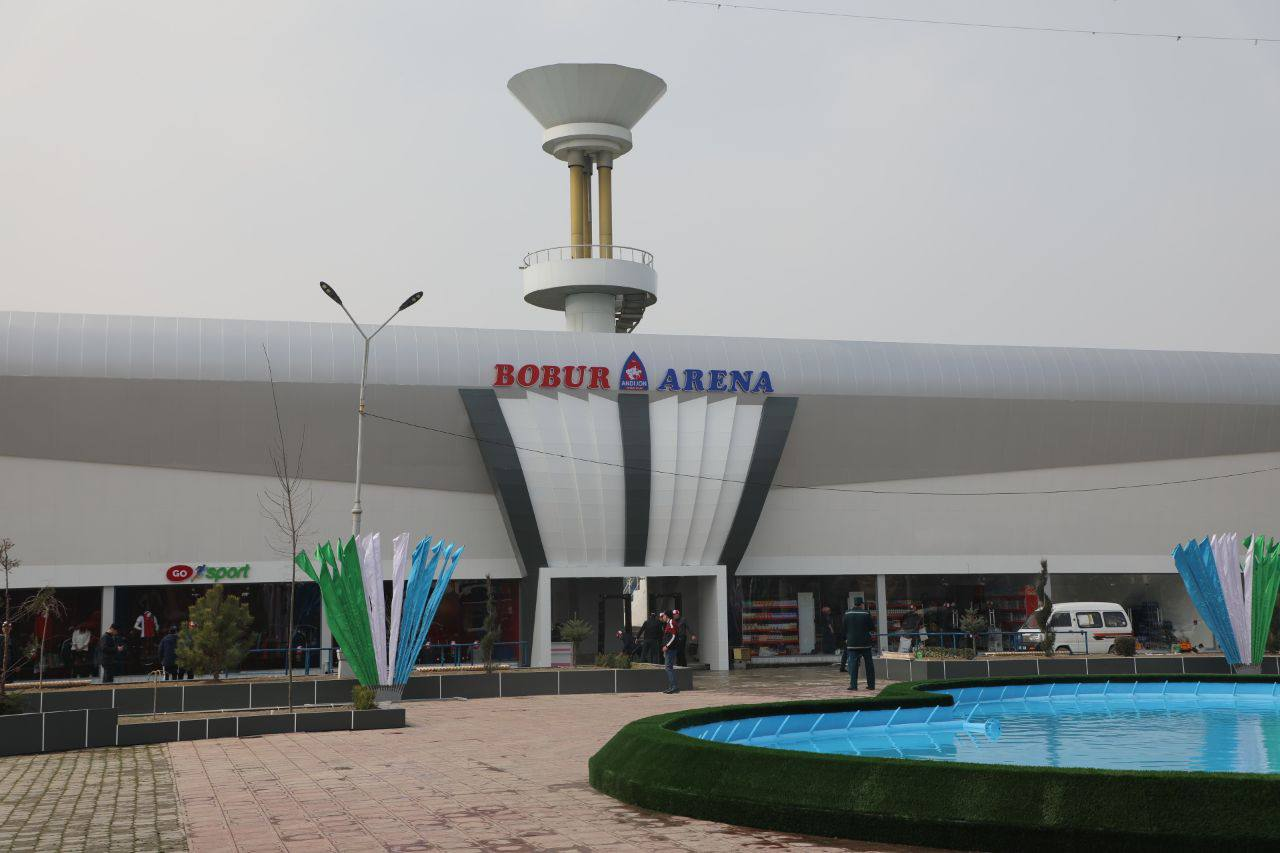
- Interactive map of Soghlom Avlod Stadium
- Full name: Sog'lom Avlod (Barkamol avlod)
- Former names: Barkamol avlod
- Location: Andijan, Uzbekistan
- Owner: Committee of sports
- Capacity: 18,360 (football)
- Surface: grass
- Scoreboard: Electronic

Construction
- Built: 2003
- Opened: 5 June 2003
- Renovated: 2019 February
- Closed: no

Tenant
- FC Andijon

Soghlom Avlod Stadium (FC Andijon) — The stadium is located in Andijan, Uzbekistan. Various sports competitions and football matches are held in this stadium. It seats 18,360 spectators.
