= Stefan Čolović =

Stefan Čolović may refer to:

- Stefan Čolović (Serbian footballer) (born 1994), Serbian football midfielder
- Stefan Čolović (Swiss footballer) (born 1994), Swiss football defender
