= Olmaliq =

Olmaliq Олмалиқ (in former Cyrillic Uzbek) Алмалык (in Russian)
- Town
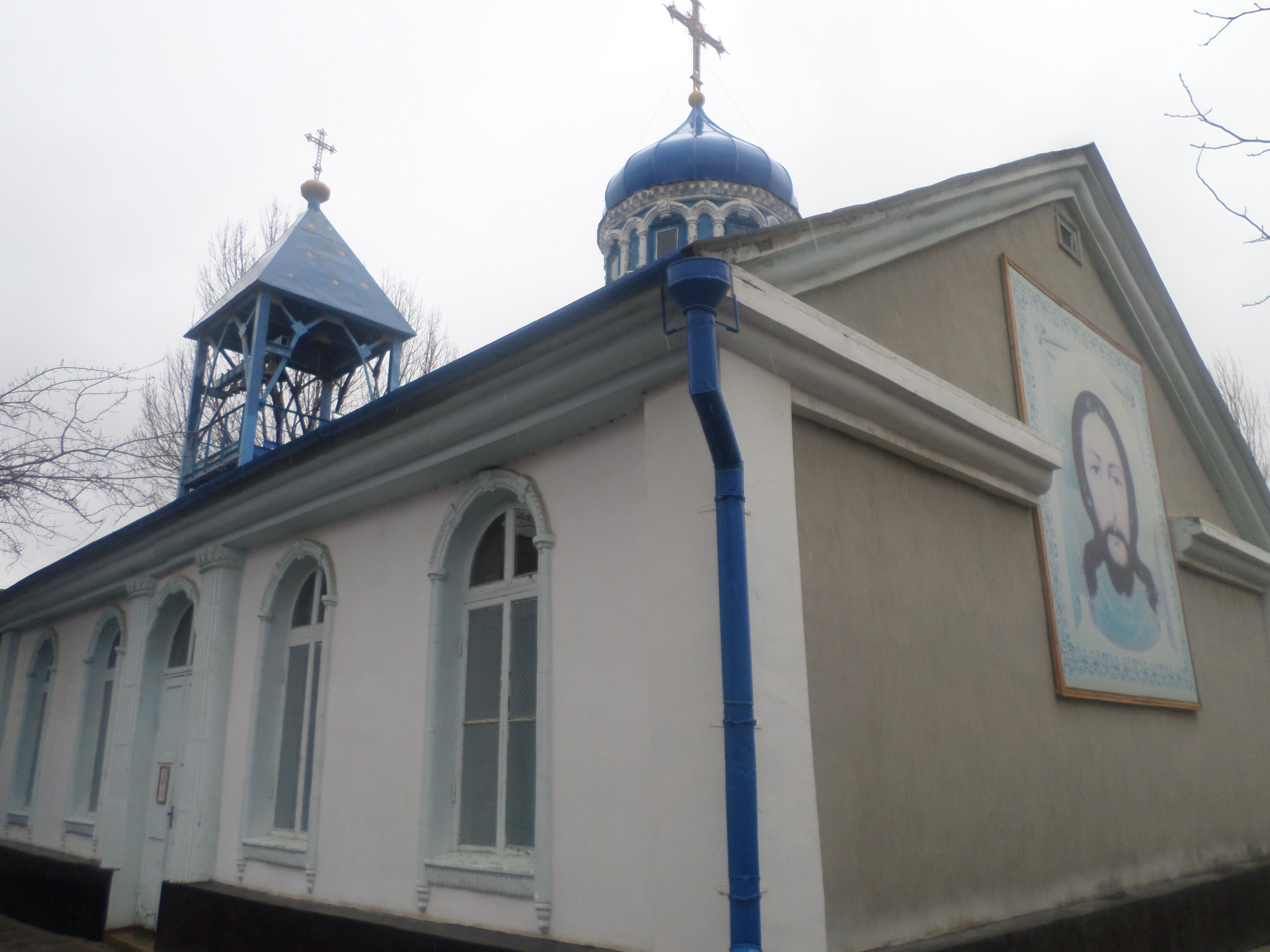
- Olmaliq Orthodox Church

- Location in Uzbekistan
- Coordinates: 40°51′N 69°36′E
- Country: Uzbekistan
- Region: Tashkent Region
- City status: 10 July 1951

Government
  - Type: City Administration
  - Hokim: Kobil Khamdamov
- Elevation: 530 m (1,740 ft)

Population (2021)
  - Total: 133,400
- Time zone: UTC+5 (UZT)
- Postal code: 110104
- Area code: (+988) 7161
- Vehicle registration: 10

Olmaliq (Uzbek: Olmaliq / Олмалиқ) is a district-level city (2021 pop 133,400) in the Tashkent Region of central Uzbekistan, approximately 65 km east of Tashkent. It is located at latitude 40° 50' 41N; longitude 69° 35' 54E; at an altitude of 585 meters.

Olmaliq is a company town developed by the Soviet Union in the 1930s, to exploit local reserves of copper, lead, zinc, gold, silver and barite. The town contains several enormous smelting facilities and related industries operated today by JSC Almalyk MMC, one of the largest mining-metallurgical enterprises in Uzbekistan.

The smelter operations have extensively contaminated Almalyk, which is considered one of the most polluted places on earth. The air has high concentrations of sulfuric acid fumes and the ground has hundreds of tons of toxic waste. The Uzbek government has resisted calls to close the plant, arguing that the country's economy cannot afford to do so: The plant employs around 25,000 residents of the city, and accounts for a substantial share of the region's economy. However, in January 2005 the government announced plans to clean up the area, with a target of 2010.

== Notable people ==
- Waldemar Anton, Uzbekistani-born German footballer
- Georgy Agzamov, Soviet chess player, international grandmaster and the first grandmaster of Central Asia.
- Rozalia Galiyeva, Soviet and Russian Olympic Champion gymnast
- Ella Pamfilova, Russian political, state and public figure.
- Dmitry Kharatyan, Soviet and Russian theater and film actor.
