= FC Andijon =

Andijon
- Full name: Football Club Andijan
- Nickname: The Eagles
- Founded: 1964; 62 years ago
- Ground: Bobur Arena
- Capacity: 18,360
- Chairman: Elbek Samatov
- Manager: Aleksandr Khomyakov
- League: Uzbekistan Super League
- 2025: Super League, 11th of 14
- Website: fcandijan.uz
Home colours	Away colours

Football Club Andijan (Uzbek: Andijon Futbol Klubi), is an Uzbek professional football club based in Andijan. The club plays in the Uzbekistan Super League.

== History ==
The club was formed 1964 under the name Spartak. In 1969, the club was renamed to Andijanez. After 1990, the club played in the Uzbek League as Navruz Andijan. Since 1997, the club has played as FK Andijan. In 1964–70, 1973–74 and 1986–91 the club played in Soviet League championships.

On 22 August 2012, the club hired Azamat Abduraimov as head coach to help Andijan remain in the top division, however the club was relegated to the Uzbekistan First League. The club finished as 2013 season runners-up after Mash'al Mubarek and gained promotion to Uzbek Super League after a single year in the First League. After the first half of the 2013 season, Andijon was 14th in the league with only 4 points. On 14 June 2014 Andijan lost an away match against Bunyodkor by 1–2. Some days later, on 20 June 2014 Azamat Abduraimov resigned. Orif Mamatkazin, as the interim of the club, was appointed as caretaker. On 26 September 2014 Edgar Gess was appointed as the club's new head coach.

On 6 October 2024, Andijon won their first ever Uzbekistan Cup, where Vladimir Bubanja scored a 120th-minute winning goal against Navbahor in the final in a 3–2 win. That was a very crucial win for the club as the club qualified to the 2025–26 AFC Champions League Two, which is first ever continental competition in club's history.

=== Club names ===
- 1964–67: Spartak
- 1969–74: Andijanez
- 1983–85: Tekstilshhik
- 1986–88: Pakhtakor
- 1989–90: Spartak
- 1991–96: Navruz
- 1997–2005: FK Andijan
- 2006–2007: Andijan UzDaewoo Auto
- 2008–present: FC Andijan

== History ==
=== Domestic ===
Season	League									Uzbek Cup	Top goalscorer		Manager
Season	Div.	Pos.	Pl.	W	D	L	GS	GA	P	Uzbek Cup	Name	League	Manager
1992	1st	7th	32	12	9	11	45	45	33	Quarterfinal	(Uzbekistan) Furqat Esonboyev	11	(Uzbekistan) K.Muminov (Uzbekistan) V.Zhukovsky
1993	1st	7th	30	11	8	11	43	41	30	Quarterfinal	(Uzbekistan) Karen Safarov	9	(Uzbekistan) V.Zhukovsky
1994	1st	11th	30	11	3	16	34	50	25	Last 16			(Uzbekistan) I.Galiulin
1995	1st	8th	30	10	7	13	38	43	38	Round of 32			(Uzbekistan) I.Galiulin
1996	1st	8th	30	11	8	11	44	51	41	Playoff Round	(Uzbekistan) Qahramon Abdukodirov	11	(Uzbekistan) I.Galiulin (Uzbekistan) B.Khakimov
1997	1st	12th	34	11	6	17	54	62	39	Last 16			(Uzbekistan) V.Borisov (Ukraine) S.Shevchenko
1998	1st	9th	30	12	4	14	59	58	40	Round of 32	(Uzbekistan) Furqat Esonboyev	11	(Ukraine) S.Shevchenko
1999	1st	6th	30	12	7	11	53	50	43		(Uzbekistan) Bakhtiyor Hamidullaev	24	(Ukraine) S.Shevchenko (Russia) B.Lavrov
2000	1st	8th	38	15	10	13	82	62	55	Round of 32	(Uzbekistan) Bakhtiyor Hamidullaev	33	(Uzbekistan) I.Galiulin
2001	1st	7th	34	15	3	16	64	58	48	Last 16	(Uzbekistan) Bakhtiyor Hamidullaev	25	(Uzbekistan) I.Galiulin
2002	1st	11th	30	9	6	15	43	61	33	Quarterfinal	(Uzbekistan) Bakhtiyor Hamidullaev	22	(Uzbekistan) I.Galiulin
2003	1st	7th	30	11	6	13	38	36	39	Playoff Round			(Tajikistan) K.Fuzailov
2004	1st	14th	26	6	1	19	30	68	19	Last 16	(Uzbekistan) Shukhrat Yusupov	8	
2005	2nd	1st	34	27	3	4	85	20	84	Last 16	(Uzbekistan) Yodgor Akbarov	26	
2006	1st	10th	30	10	5	15	46	52	35	Round of 32	(Uzbekistan) Bakhtiyor Hamidullaev	17	(Germany) Gess
2007	1st	10th	30	10	5	15	37	45	35	Quarterfinal			(Germany) Gess (Russia) Sekech (Uzbekistan) O.Mamatkazin
2008	1st	5th	30	13	7	10	35	28	46	Last 16	(Georgia (country)) Levan Mdivnishvili	11	(Russia) V.Bondarenko (Uzbekistan) O.Mamatkazin
2009	1st	7th	30	10	9	11	47	48	39	Last 16			(Uzbekistan) O.Mamatkazin
2010	1st	7th	26	9	7	10	28	29	34	Quarterfinal	(Uzbekistan) Shuhrat Mirkholdirshoev	11	(Ukraine) A.Memet
2011	1st	12th	26	7	7	12	29	43	28	Last 16	(Uzbekistan) Lochinbek Soliev	11	(Uzbekistan) O.Mamatkazin (Russia) A.Averyanov
2012	1st	14th	26	4	4	18	28	52	16	Quarterfinal	(Russia) Vladimir Shishelov	7	(Russia) A.Averyanov (Uzbekistan) A.Abduraimov
2013	2nd	2nd	30	23	2	5	76	24	71	Round of 32	(Uzbekistan) Lochinbek Soliev	15	(Uzbekistan) A.Abduraimov
2014	1st	14th	26	3	3	20	18	50	12	Last 16	(Uzbekistan) Abdulatif Abdukadyrov	3	(Uzbekistan) A.Abduraimov (Uzbekistan) O.Mamatkazin (Ukraine) S.Shevchenko (Germany) E.Gess
2015	1st	13th	30	8	4	18	27	56	28	Last 16	(Uzbekistan) Anvar Berdiev	7	(Germany) E.Gess (Uzbekistan) S.Kovshov
2016	1st	16th	30	6	5	19	20	50	23	Quarterfinal	(Uzbekistan) Anvar Berdiev	4	(Uzbekistan) S.Kovshov (Uzbekistan) B.Ashurmatov (Uzbekistan) O.Mamatkazin
2017	2nd	3rd	34	21	9	4	73	32	72	Second Round			(Uzbekistan) U.Toshev
2018	2nd	1st	32	18	9	5	57	29	63	Quarterfinal			(Uzbekistan) I.Sakaev
2019	1st	10th	26	6	10	10	23	37	28	Last 16	(Uzbekistan) Shakhzod Ubaydullaev	9	(Uzbekistan) I.Sakaev (Russia) A.Khomyakov
2020	1st	13th	26	2	10	14	16	38	16	Last 16	(Uzbekistan) Djamshid Khasanov	5	(Russia) A.Khomyakov (Russia) V.Kumykov
2021	1st	13th	26	4	7	15	22	41	19	Group stage	(Uzbekistan) Usmonali Ismonaliyev	5	(Russia) V.Kumykov
2022	2nd	1st	26	17	6	3	42	25	57	Quarterfinal	(Uzbekistan) Shahboz Erkinov	12	
2023	1st	7th	26	12	4	10	27	25	40	Group stage	(Albania) Rubin Hebaj	12	(Russia) A.Khomyakov
2024	1st	9th	26	6	12	8	36	36	30	Cup winners	(Uzbekistan) Rustam Turdimurodov	7	(Russia) A.Khomyakov
2025	1st	11th	30	9	8	13	39	51	35	Group stage	(Uzbekistan) Abdumannopov Doniyor (Uzbekistan) Ismonaliev Usmonali	5	(Russia) / (Uzbekistan) Aleksandr Xomyakov (Uzbekistan) / (Ukraine) Maksim Shatskikh

=== Continental ===
As of match played 24 December 2025

Competition	Pld	W	D	L	GF	GA
AFC Champions League Two	6	0	5	1	1	3
Total	6	0	1	5	1	3

Season	Competition	Round	Club	Home	Away	Aggregate
2025–26	AFC Champions League 2	Group B	(Qatar) Al Ahli	0–0	0–2	4th
2025–26	AFC Champions League 2	Group B	(Bahrain) Al-Khaldiya	0–0	0–0	4th
2025–26	AFC Champions League 2	Group B	(Turkmenistan) Arkadag	1–1	0–0	4th

== Players ==
=== Current squad ===
As of 29 July 2026

Note: Flags indicate national team as defined under FIFA eligibility rules; some limited exceptions apply. Players may hold more than one non-FIFA nationality.

No.	Pos.	Nation	Player
1	GK	UZB	Eldor Adkhamov
2	DF	UZB	Odil Abdumajidov
5	DF	UZB	Abduvokhid Gulomov
6	MF	GEO	Aleksandre Andronikashvili
7	FW	UZB	Pulatkhuzha Kholdorkhonov
8	MF	UZB	Shokhmalik Komilov
9	FW	GEO	Imeda Ashortia
10	MF	SRB	Dragan Ćeran
11	FW	UZB	Khumoyunmirzo Iminov
14	DF	UZB	Abdurakhmon Komilov
15	DF	SRB	Nemanja Ćalasan
17	MF	UZB	Azizbek Turgunboev

No.	Pos.	Nation	Player
18	MF	UZB	Damir Temirov
19	GK	RUS	Artyom Potapov
20	DF	UZB	Islom Tukhtakhujaev
22	DF	UZB	Usmonali Ismonaliev
26	MF	UZB	Mukhammadkarim Toirov
27	FW	ITA	Martin Boakye
28	DF	UZB	Bekzod Sulaymonov
31	GK	UZB	Shoyadbek Ravshanov
33	MF	UZB	Doniyor Abdumannopov
70	FW	UZB	Khamidullo Karimov
88	MF	UZB	Shokhjakhon Yorkinboev
99	FW	UZB	Rustam Turdimurodov

== Personnel ==
=== Current technical staff ===
Position	Name
Manager	(Russia) Aleksandr Khomyakov
Assistant coach	
Goalkeeping coach	

== Honours ==
- Uzbekistan Cup
  - Champions (1): 2024
- Uzbekistan Pro League
  - Champions (3): 2005, 2018, 2022
- Uzbekistan Super Cup
  - Runners-up (1): 2025
- Uzbekistan First League
  - Runners-up (1): 2013

== Managerial history ==
- (Russian Soviet Federative Socialist Republic) Aleksandr Averyanov (1986–87)
- (Uzbek Soviet Socialist Republic) Berador Abduraimov (1989)
- (Soviet Union) Igor Frolov (1989)
- (Soviet Union) Aleksei Petrushin (1990)
- (Uzbekistan) Karim Muminov (1992)
- (Ukraine) Serhiy Shevchenko (1997–99)
- (Tajikistan) Khakim Fuzailov (2003)
- (Germany) Edgar Gess (2006–07)
- (Russia) Ishtvan Sekech (2007)
- (Uzbekistan) Orif Mamatkazin (2007–09)
- (Ukraine) Amet Memet (2010)
- (Uzbekistan) Orif Mamatkazin (2011)
- (Russia) Aleksandr Averyanov (Dec 2011 – Aug 2012)
- (Uzbekistan) Azamat Abduraimov (Aug 2012 – June 2014)
- (Uzbekistan) Orif Mamatkazin (interim) (June 2014 – July 2014)
- (Ukraine) Serhiy Shevchenko (2014–1?)
- (Germany) Edgar Gess (Sept 2014– 28 August 2015)
- (Uzbekistan) Sardor Kovshov (2 September 2015– 30 January 2016)
- (Uzbekistan) Bakhtiyor Ashurmatov (30 January 2016– 14 June 2016)
- (Uzbekistan) Orif Mamatkazin (14 June 2016– )
- (Uzbekistan) Ildar Sakaev (2018–2019)
- (Russia) Aleksandr Khomyakov (2019 June 2020 March-)
- (Russia) Viktor Kumykov (2020 May – 2023 January)
- (Russia) Aleksandr Khomyakov (2023 January – present)

== Partners and Sponsors ==
On 12 March 2025 club signed partnership agreement with Centrum Air - private Uzbekistan airline company.
