= 2024 Pakhtakor FC season =

Pakhtakor Tashkent
2024 season
- President: Bobur Shodiev
- Manager: Maksim Shatskikh
- Uzbek League: 6th
- Uzbekistan Cup: Semifinal vs Navbahor
- Super Cup: Runners Up
- AFC Champions League Elite: Group Stage
- Top goalscorer: League: Dragan Ćeran (13); All: Dragan Ćeran (15)
Home colours	Away colours

The 2024 season was Pakhtakor Tashkent's 33rd season in the Uzbek League in Uzbekistan.

== Season events ==
On 1 February, Mukhammadali Urinboev joined Brentford B, the development team for Premier League club Brentford, on loan until 30 June, with an option to make the move permanent.

Vladimir Nazarov, Mukhammadkodir Khamraliev, Behruzbek Askarov, Abdurauf Buriev, Ibrokhim Ibrokhimov and Diyor Kholmatov were all called up to represent Uzbekistan at the 2024 Olympics in Paris.

== Squad ==
As of match played 3 December 2024

No.	Name	Nationality	Position	Date of birth (age)	Signed from	Signed in	Contract ends	Apps.	Goals
Goalkeepers
1	Nikita Shevchenko	(Uzbekistan)	GK	27 November 2003 (aged 21)	Unattached	2023		0	0
12	Vladimir Nazarov	(Uzbekistan)	GK	8 June 2002 (aged 22)	on loan from Surkhon Termez	2024	2024	21	0
21	Otabek Boymurodov	(Uzbekistan)	GK	5 June 2003 (aged 21)	Academy	2022	2025	0	0
35	Pavel Pavlyuchenko	(Belarus)	GK	1 January 1998 (aged 26)	Bruk-Bet Termalica Nieciecza	2023		27	0
Defenders
5	Mukhammadkodir Khamraliev	(Uzbekistan)	DF	6 July 2001 (aged 23)	Dinamo Samarqand	2023		44	2
7	Khojiakbar Alijonov	(Uzbekistan)	DF	19 April 1997 (aged 27)	Academy	2017		198	9
12	Sunnatilla Poyonov	(Uzbekistan)	DF	16 June 2004 (aged 20)	Academy	2023		3	0
15	Diyor Ortikboev	(Uzbekistan)	DF	6 January 2003 (aged 21)	Academy	2021		14	0
22	Umar Adkhamzoda	(Uzbekistan)	DF	4 April 1998 (aged 26)	Neftchi Fergana	2024	2025	36	2
24	Kirill Todorov	(Uzbekistan)	DF	24 May 2004 (aged 20)	Academy	2023		6	1
44	Makhmud Makhamadzhonov	(Uzbekistan)	DF	30 June 2003 (aged 21)	on loan from Bunyodkor	2024	2024	15	0
55	Mukhammadrasul Abdumazhidov	(Uzbekistan)	DF	23 July 2004 (aged 20)	Academy	2023		33	1
77	Dilshod Saitov	(Uzbekistan)	DF	2 February 1999 (aged 25)	Nasaf	2023		40	2
88	Shakhzod Azmiddinov	(Uzbekistan)	DF	7 August 2000 (aged 24)	Academy	2020		90	4
Midfielders
2	Behruzbek Askarov	(Uzbekistan)	MF	8 March 2003 (aged 21)	Academy	2023		37	1
4	Abdulla Abdullaev	(Uzbekistan)	MF	1 September 1997 (aged 27)	Khor Fakkan	2024		21	1
8	Diyor Kholmatov	(Uzbekistan)	MF	22 July 2002 (aged 22)	Youth Team	2020		109	6
9	Ibrokhim Ibrokhimov	(Uzbekistan)	MF	12 January 2001 (aged 23)	Olympic Tashkent	2024		7	0
17	Dostonbek Khamdamov	(Uzbekistan)	MF	24 July 1996 (aged 28)	Al-Nasr	2021		174	36
18	Saidumarxon Saidnurullayev	(Uzbekistan)	MF	13 April 2005 (aged 19)	Academy	2023		13	0
23	Abdurauf Buriev	(Uzbekistan)	MF	20 July 2002 (aged 22)	Olympic Tashkent	2023		18	0
27	Sardor Sabirkhodjaev	(Uzbekistan)	MF	6 November 1994 (aged 30)	Bunyodkor	2019		201	13
29	Muhriddin Pazildinov	(Uzbekistan)	MF	9 April 2004 (aged 20)	Academy	2023		1	0
31	Mukhammadali Usmonov	(Uzbekistan)	MF	9 December 2004 (aged 19)	Academy	2023		22	3
33	Doniyor Abdumannopov	(Uzbekistan)	MF	12 October 2000 (aged 24)	Navbahor	2024		24	4
40	Kimi Merk	(Kyrgyzstan)	MF	6 July 2004 (aged 20)	Kaiserslautern II	2023		25	6
41	Diyorbek Ortiqboyev	(Uzbekistan)	MF	6 January 2003 (aged 21)	Academy	2021		5	0
49	Dilshod Abdullayev	(Uzbekistan)	MF	9 May 2005 (aged 19)	Academy	2023		2	0
52	Nurlan Ibraimov	(Uzbekistan)	MF	29 August 2005 (aged 19)	Academy	2023		2	0
Forwards
6	Mukhammadali Urinboev	(Uzbekistan)	FW	24 April 2005 (aged 19)	Academy	2021		28	2
10	Dragan Ćeran	(Serbia)	FW	6 October 1987 (aged 37)	Nasaf	2018		217	140
11	Po'latkhoja Kholdorkhonov	(Uzbekistan)	FW	6 July 2003 (aged 21)	Academy	2021		52	4
30	Otabek Jurakuziev	(Uzbekistan)	FW	2 April 2002 (aged 22)	Olympic Tashkent	2024		17	3
99	Ulugbek Khoshimov	(Uzbekistan)	FW	3 January 2001 (aged 23)	Surkhon Termez	2024		20	2
Players away on loan
12	Sunnatilla Poyonov	(Uzbekistan)	DF	16 June 2004 (aged 20)	Academy	2023		2	0
20	Abubakir Ashurov	(Uzbekistan)	DF	12 June 2003 (aged 21)	Academy	2023		0	0
30	Shahzodbek Rahmatullayev	(Uzbekistan)	MF	7 May 2003 (aged 21)	Academy	2023		0	0
38	Temur Odilov	(Uzbekistan)	DF	12 October 2005 (aged 19)	Academy	2023		0	0
42	Rustambek Fomin	(Uzbekistan)	MF	9 July 2005 (aged 19)	Academy	2023		0	0
44	Daler Tuxsanov	(Uzbekistan)	MF	11 April 2005 (aged 19)	Academy	2023		0	0
99	Abbos Ergashboev	(Uzbekistan)	FW	28 March 2003 (aged 21)	Academy	2022		6	1
	Akbar O'ktamov	(Uzbekistan)	FW	11 February 2004 (aged 20)	Academy	2023		0	0
	Rustam Turdimurodov	(Uzbekistan)	FW	4 April 2004 (aged 20)	Academy	2022		6	0
Players who left during the season
4	Dostonbek Tursunov	(Uzbekistan)	DF	13 June 1995 (aged 29)	Chongqing Liangjiang Athletic	2022		24	2
8	Azizbek Turgunboev	(Uzbekistan)	MF	1 October 1994 (aged 30)	Navbahor Namangan	2021		103	17
9	Michał Kucharczyk	(Poland)	MF	20 March 1991 (aged 33)	Unattached	2023	2024	4	0
28	Javokhir Alizhonov	(Uzbekistan)	FW	28 January 2000 (aged 24)	Academy	2023		2	0

== Transfers ==
=== In ===
Date	Position	Nationality	Name	From	Fee	Ref.
1 January 2024	MF	(Uzbekistan)	Umar Adkhamzoda	Neftchi Fergana	Undisclosed	

=== Out ===
Date	Position	Nationality	Name	To	Fee	Ref.
1 January 2024	GK	(Uzbekistan)	Sanjar Kuvvatov	Neftchi Fergana	Undisclosed	
5 January 2024	FW	(Uzbekistan)	Mirzhakhon Mirakhmadov	Bunyodkor	Undisclosed	
30 January 2024	DF	(Uzbekistan)	Farrukh Sayfiev	Navbahor	Undisclosed	
30 January 2024	MF	(Uzbekistan)	Odiljon Hamrobekov	Navbahor	Undisclosed	
7 February 2024	FW	(Poland)	Michał Kucharczyk	Legia Warsaw II	Undisclosed	
8 February 2024	MF	(Uzbekistan)	Azizbek Turgunboev	Sivasspor	Undisclosed	
15 February 2024	DF	(Netherlands)	Matthew Steenvoorden	Terengganu	Undisclosed	

=== Loans out ===
Start date	Position	Nationality	Name	To	End date	Ref.
16 January 2024	MF	(Uzbekistan)	Abdurauf Buriev	Olympic Tashkent	7 July 2024	
1 February 2024	FW	(Uzbekistan)	Mukhammadali Urinboev	Brentford B	30 June 2024	
23 February 2024	MF	(Uzbekistan)	Shakhzod Rakhmatullaev	Qizilqum Zarafshon	31 December 2024	

=== Released ===
Date	Position	Nationality	Name	Joined	Date	Ref
31 December 2024	GK	(Belarus)	Pavel Pavlyuchenko	Maxline Vitebsk	10 January 2025	
31 December 2024	DF	(Uzbekistan)	Sunnatilla Poyonov	Surkhon Termez		
31 December 2024	MF	(Uzbekistan)	Doniyor Abdumannopov	Andijon		
31 December 2024	MF	(Uzbekistan)	Shakhzod Rakhmatullaev	Qizilqum Zarafshon		
31 December 2024	FW	(Serbia)	Dragan Ćeran	Nasaf	22 January 2025	

== Competitions ==
=== Overview ===
Competition	First match	Last match	Starting round	Final position	Record							
Competition	First match	Last match	Starting round	Final position	Pld	W	D	L	GF	GA	GD	Win %
Super League	4 March 2024	30 November 2024	Matchday 1	6th	26	11	5	10	42	37	+5	42.31
Uzbekistan Cup	12 May 2024	30 August 2024	Group stage	Semifinal	6	3	1	2	6	4	+2	50.00
Super Cup	29 May 2024		Final	Runners Up	1	0	1	0	1	1	+0	0.00
AFC Champions League Elite	17 September 2024	5 December 2024	Matchday 1	2025 season	6	0	4	2	2	4	−2	0.00
Total					39	14	11	14	51	46	+5	35.90

Last updated: 5 December 2024
Source: Competitions

=== Super Cup ===
29 May 2024	Pakhtakor	1 – 1 (a.e.t.) (3 – 4 p)	Nasaf	Tashkent
19:00 UZT (UTC+5)	Saidnurullaev (yellow card) 38'; Ćeran (yellow card) 52' (goal) 54' (pen.)	Report	Kenjaboyev (yellow card) 68'; Mukhiddinov 80'	Stadium: Milliy Stadium; Attendance: 14,140; Referee: Aziz Asymov
	Penalties
	Ćeran (penalty missed); Azmiddinov (penalty scored); Adkhamzoda (penalty scored); Khamdamov (penalty scored); Kholmatov (penalty missed); Khamraliev (penalty missed)		Mukhiddinov (penalty missed); Sidikov (penalty scored); Mozgovoy (penalty scored); Nasrullaev (penalty missed); Nematov (penalty scored); Victor (penalty scored)

=== Super League ===
==== League table ====
Pos	Team	Pld	W	D	L	GF	GA	GD	Pts
4	Navbahor	26	11	10	5	42	31	+11	43
5	Neftchi	26	11	10	5	32	24	+8	43
6	Pakhtakor	26	11	5	10	42	37	+5	38
7	Surkhon	26	10	6	10	30	31	−1	36
8	Dinamo Samarqand	26	9	5	12	35	38	−3	32

Source: Uzbekistan Professional Football League
Rules for classification: 1) points; 2) head-to-head points; 3) head-to-head goal difference; 4) head-to-head away goals scored; 5) goal difference; 6) number of goals scored.

==== Results summary ====
Overall								Home						Away					
Pld	W	D	L	GF	GA	GD	Pts	W	D	L	GF	GA	GD	W	D	L	GF	GA	GD
0	0	0	0	0	0	0	0	0	0	0	0	0	0	0	0	0	0	0	0

Last updated: 30 November 2024.
Source: See Results

==== Results by round ====
Round	1
Ground	
Result	
Position	

Source: See Results
A = Away; H = Home; W = Win; D = Draw; L = Loss

==== Results ====
4 March 2024 1	Surkhon Termez	0 – 3	Pakhtakor	Tashkent
18:30 UZT (UTC+5)	Khoshimov (yellow card) 46'; Hamidjonov (yellow card) 55'	Report	Ćeran 3', 70'; Khamdamov 52'; Adkhamzoda (yellow card) 86'	Stadium: Central Stadium; Attendance: 689; Referee: Abdurashid Khudoyberganov

8 March 2024 2	Pakhtakor	0 – 0	Nasaf	Tashkent
17:15 UZT (UTC+5)	Askarov (yellow card) 38'; Adkhamzoda (yellow card) 81'; Ortikboev (yellow card) 90+3'	Report	Abdikholikov (yellow card) 68'; Stanojević (yellow card) 73'; Golban (yellow card) 89'	Stadium: Central Stadium; Attendance: 3,220; Referee: Akobirkhuja Shukurullaev

14 March 2024 3	Lokomotiv Tashkent	3 – 0	Pakhtakor	Tashkent
18:45 UZT (UTC+5)	Rogač (yellow card) 8'; Khasanov 21'; Krajišnik 38' (pen.) (yellow card) 71'; Bulatović 47' (yellow card) 47'; Yoldoshev (yellow card) 77'; D.Komilov (yellow card) 80'	Report	Merk (yellow card) 85'	Stadium: Lokomotiv Stadium; Attendance: 836; Referee: Rustam Lutfullin

30 March 2024 4	Pakhtakor	2 – 3	Sogdiana Jizzakh	Tashkent
19:00 UZT (UTC+5)	Abdumannopov 11'; Khamdamov 45+2'	Report	Abdurakhmonov 23', 33', 52'; Doriev (yellow card) 65'; Fozilov (yellow card) 77'	Stadium: Central Stadium; Attendance: 556; Referee: Shavkat Nasibullaev

7 May 2024 6	Pakhtakor	4 – 3	Metallurg Bekabad	Tashkent
19:00 UZT (UTC+5)	Askarov 8'; Merk 15', 39'; Ćeran 84'	Report	Gofurbekov (yellow card) 3'; Otakhonov 31'; Milićković 60' (pen.); Sharipov 90+5'	Stadium: Central Stadium; Attendance: 2,245; Referee: Abdurashid Khudoyberganov

11 May 2024 7	Olympic Tashkent	1 – 2	Pakhtakor	Tashkent
19:00 UZT (UTC+5)	Jurakuziev (yellow card) 31'; Bozorov 88'	Report	Adkhamzoda (yellow card) 23'; Azmiddinov (yellow card) 72'; Khamdamov 79'; Usmonov 90'	Stadium: JAR Stadium; Attendance: 4,555; Referee: Akobirkhuja Shukurullaev

20 May 2024 8	Dinamo Samarqand	1 – 1	Pakhtakor	Jizzakh
19:00 UZT (UTC+5)	Abdumajidov (yellow card) 75'; Kojo 85'	Report	Ćeran 16' (pen.) (yellow card) 38'; Ortikboev (yellow card) 44'; Azmiddinov (yellow card) 76'	Stadium: Sogdiana Stadium; Attendance: 1,336; Referee: Akmaljon Rakhimov

25 May 2024 9	Pakhtakor	1 – 1	Qizilqum Zarafshon	Tashkent
19:00 UZT (UTC+5)	Khamdamov 51'; Ćeran (yellow card) 56'; Sabirkhodjaev (red card) 56'	Report	Lobjanidze 41'; Anvarov (yellow card) 45+5'; Shukurullaev (yellow card) 74'	Stadium: Central Stadium; Attendance: 987; Referee: Farukh Yansupov

2 June 2024 10	Andijon	1 – 3	Pakhtakor	Andijan
19:00 UZT (UTC+5)	Bubanja 54'	Report	Usmonov 4'; Khamdamov 30'; Abdumajidov (yellow card) 53'; Azmiddinov (yellow card) 64'; Ćeran 88'	Stadium: Bobur Arena; Attendance: 17,152; Referee: Shavkat Nasibullaev

16 June 2024 11	Pakhtakor	0 – 0	Navbahor	Tashkent
20:00 UZT (UTC+5)	Sabirkhodjaev (yellow card) 33'; Adkhamzoda (yellow card) 58'	Report	Boltaboev (yellow card) 64'; Sayfiev (yellow card) 76'; Shodiboev (yellow card) 90+3'	Stadium: Central Stadium; Attendance: 3,751; Referee: Abdurashid Khudoyberganov

21 June 2024 12	AGMK	4 – 2	Pakhtakor	Olmaliq
20:00 UZT (UTC+5)	Sentoku 34' (yellow card) 61'; Abdurazzokov (yellow card) 68'; Giyosov 79'; Papava 90+1'; Rukhadze 90+6' (yellow card) 90+6'	Report	Ćeran 14' (pen.); Abdumajidov 45+3'; Ortikboev (yellow card) 66'; Askarov (yellow card) 90+3'	Stadium: OKMK Sport Majmuasi; Attendance: 2,078; Referee: Rakhimbek Karimov

27 June 2024 13	Pakhtakor	1 – 0	Bunyodkor	Tashkent
20:00 UZT (UTC+5)	Ćeran 8'; Sabirkhodjaev (yellow card) 56'	Report	Turakulov (yellow card) 84'	Stadium: Central Stadium; Attendance: 1,258; Referee: Khushnud Suyunboyev

1 July 2024 5	Neftchi Fergana	0 – 2	Pakhtakor	Fergana
20:00 UZT (UTC+5)	Kodirkulov (yellow card) 4'	Report	Adkhamzoda (yellow card) 14'; Khamdamov 16'; Abdumannopov 40'; Alijonov (yellow card) 50'; Kholmatov (yellow card) 60'; Azmiddinov (yellow card) 63'	Stadium: Istiqlol Stadium; Attendance: 14,785; Referee: Asker Nadjafaliev

10 August 2024 15	Nasaf	1 – 0	Pakhtakor	Qarshi
20:00 UZT (UTC+5)	Sidikov (yellow card) 41' (goal) 63' (pen.); Abdurahmatov (yellow card) 58'	Report	Khamraliev (yellow card) 61'	Stadium: Markaziy Stadium; Attendance: 3,381; Referee: Sultonmurod Abdurakhmonov

18 August 2024 16	Pakhtakor	3 – 1	Lokomotiv Tashkent	Tashkent
20:15 UZT (UTC+5)	Abdumannopov 16', 65'; Ćeran 19'; Sabirkhodjaev (yellow card) 56'; Adkhamzoda (yellow card) 87'	Report	Kichin (yellow card) 39'; Abdunabiyev 81'	Stadium: JAR Stadium; Attendance: 1,465; Referee: Ibroxim Ismailov

22 August 2024 14	Pakhtakor	0 – 1	Surkhon Termez	Tashkent
19:00 UZT (UTC+5)	Pavlyuchenko (yellow card) 29'; Abdumannopov (yellow card) 35'; Adkhamzoda (yellow card) 90+9'	Report	Abdusalomov 23'; Merganov (yellow card) 42'; Pletnyov (yellow card) 52'; Shamsiyev (yellow card) 90+6'	Stadium: JAR Stadium; Attendance: 3,381; Referee: Akmaljon Rakhimov

26 August 2024 17	Sogdiana Jizzakh	0 – 1	Pakhtakor	Jizzakh
19:00 UZT (UTC+5)	Jovović (yellow card) 21'; Sultonov (yellow card) 83'; Zoteyev (yellow card) 90+7'; Mustafokulov (red card) 90+8'	Report	Buriev (yellow card) 60'; Izzatov 67' (o.g.); Ćeran (yellow card) 78'; Nazarov (yellow card) 90'; Khoshimov (yellow card) 90'	Stadium: Sogdiana Stadium; Attendance: 4,002; Referee: Firdavs Norsafarov

13 September 2024 18	Pakhtakor	0 – 0	Neftchi Fergana	Tashkent
19:30 UZT (UTC+5)	Ibrokhimov (yellow card) 26'; Abdullaev (yellow card) 77'	Report		Stadium: JAR Stadium; Attendance: 2,442; Referee: Temurbek Tuxtasinov

21 September 2024 19	Metallurg Bekabad	3 – 2	Pakhtakor	Bekabad
17:00 UZT (UTC+5)	Gofurbekov (yellow card) 41'; Sattorov 66'; Nematjonov (yellow card) 71'; Urinboev 72' (yellow card) 73'; Shaykulov (yellow card) 88'; Palić (yellow card) 90+1'; Milićković 90+8' (yellow card) 90+9'	Report	Ćeran 4'; Abdullaev 90+2'	Stadium: Metallurg Bekabad Stadium; Attendance: 421; Referee: Asker Nadjafaliyev

25 September 2024 20	Pakhtakor	6 – 0	Olympic Tashkent	Tashkent
17:30 UZT (UTC+5)	Adkhamzoda 29'; Ćeran 31'; Khoshimov 37'; Khamraliev 46' (yellow card) 90+4'; Abdirasulov 68' (o.g.); Usmonov 83'	Report	Uktamov (yellow card) 51'; Toirov (yellow card) 85'	Stadium: JAR Stadium; Attendance: 890; Referee: Toʻrabek Suyunov

6 October 2024 21	Pakhtakor	4 – 2	Dinamo Samarqand	Tashkent
14:00 UZT (UTC+5)	Ćeran 9', 42' (pen.), 72' (pen.); Khamdamov (yellow card) 22'; Adkhamzoda (yellow card) 50'; Kholmatov 90+5'	Report	Douglas 18'; Mijić 55'	Stadium: JAR Stadium; Attendance: 3,651; Referee: Olim Tuychibayev

26 October 2024 22	Qizilqum Zarafshon	2 – 0	Pakhtakor	Qarshi
16:00 UZT (UTC+5)	Lobjanidze 10'; Vahobov (yellow card) 31'; Giyosov 85'; Sayyotov (yellow card) 90+1'	Report		Stadium: Markaziy Stadium; Attendance: 523; Referee: Gʻayrat Djurayev

31 October 2024 23	Pakhtakor	3 – 1	Andijon	Tashkent
18:15 UZT (UTC+5)	Khoshimov 15'; Jurakuziev (yellow card) 54'; Urinboev 61'; Merk 90+4'	Report	Abdumannonov 35'; A.Komilov (yellow card) 64'	Stadium: JAR Stadium; Attendance: 2,165; Referee: Nikita Mustafin

9 November 2024 24	Navbahor	5 – 2	Pakhtakor	Namangan
16:00 UZT (UTC+5)	Hagh Nazari 3', 43'; Iskanderov 62', 90+6'; Sayfiev (yellow card) 74'; Nikabadze (yellow card) 78' (goal) 90+2'; Đokić (yellow card) 80'; Tojiddinov (yellow card) 89'; Ahmedov (yellow card) 90+6'	Report	Jurakuziev 36', 46'; Khoshimov (yellow card) 38'; Abdumajidov (yellow card) 51'; Askarov (red card) 56'; Sabirkhodjaev (yellow card) 65'	Stadium: Markaziy Stadium; Attendance: 3,812; Referee: Rustam Lutfullin

21 November 2024 25	Pakhtakor	0 – 2	AGMK	Tashkent
18:00 UZT (UTC+5)	Buriev (yellow card) 70'	Report	Abdurazzokov 32'; Kosimov (yellow card) 55'; Sentoku (yellow card) 73' (goal) 85'	Stadium: JAR Stadium; Attendance: 1,146; Referee: Nayim Qosimov

30 November 2024 26	Bunyodkor	2 – 0	Pakhtakor	Tashkent
15:00 UZT (UTC+5)	Filipović 35' (yellow card) 66'; Rašo 79'; Rahimjonov (yellow card) 87'	Report	Todorov (yellow card) 19'; Abdullaev (yellow card) 39'	Stadium: Milliy Stadium; Attendance: 764; Referee: Temurbek Tuxtasinov

=== Uzbek Cup ===
==== Group stage ====
Pos	Team	Pld	W	D	L	GF	GA	GD	Pts	Qualification
1	Sogdiana Jizzakh (Q)	3	3	0	0	7	2	+5	9	Advanced to Round of 16
2	Pakhtakor Tashkent (Q)	3	1	1	1	4	4	0	4	Advanced to Round of 16
3	Kokand 1912 (E)	3	0	2	1	1	3	−2	2	
4	Jizzax (E)	3	0	1	2	2	5	−3	1	

Updated to match(es) played on 26 April 2024. Source: PFL
(E) Eliminated; (Q) Qualified for the phase indicated

12 April 2024 1	Jizzax	1 – 2	Pakhtakor	Jizzakh
15:00 UZT (UTC+5)	Sayimnazarov (yellow card) 2'; Malikov (yellow card) 5'; Shodmonov 7'; Oripov (yellow card) 59'	Report	Khamdamov 2' (pen.); Merk 10'; Ibraimov (yellow card) 42'; Adkhamzoda (yellow card) 60'; Ergashboev (yellow card) 81'	Stadium: FMM Maydoni; Attendance: 352; Referee: To’rabek Suyunov

19 April 2024 2	Pakhtakor	0 – 0	Kokand 1912	Tashkent
16:30 UZT (UTC+5)	Ortikboev (red card) 54'; Saidnurullaev (yellow card) 84'	Report	Malikjanov (yellow card) 57'; Ismoilov (yellow card) 71'; Zokirjonov (yellow card) 90+3'	Stadium: Central Stadium; Attendance: 513; Referee: Rahimbek Karimov

26 April 2024 3	Pakhtakor	2 – 3	Sogdiana Jizzakh	Tashkent
16:30 UZT (UTC+5)	Sabirkhodjaev (yellow card) 8' (yellow-red card) 42'; Merk 13', 75'	Report	Mavlonqulov 6'; Abdurakhmonov 12' (pen.); Andreev 15'; Mustafokulov (yellow card) 86'	Stadium: Central Stadium; Attendance: 545; Referee: Ilgiz Tantashev

==== Knockout stage ====
6 July 2024 Round of 16	Aral	0 – 1	Pakhtakor	Tashkent
20:30 UZT (UTC+5)	Ibragimov (yellow card) 24'	Report	Azmiddinov (yellow card) 32'; Adkhamzoda 88'; Kholdorkhonov (yellow card) 89'	Stadium: Central Stadium; Attendance: 723; Referee: Nayim Qosimov

15 August 2024 Quarterfinal	Bunyodkor	0 – 1 (a.e.t.)	Pakhtakor	Tashkent
19:30 UZT (UTC+5)	Filipović (yellow card) 39'; Turakulov (yellow card) 45+3'; Kaçorri (yellow card) 60'; Muqimjonov (yellow card) 98'; Tulkinbekov (yellow card) 104'; Abdukholiqov (yellow card) 112'	Report	Buriev (yellow card) 18'; Adkhamzoda (yellow card) 52'; Azmiddinov 101' (pen.); Merk (yellow card) 120'	Stadium: Milliy Stadium; Attendance: 990; Referee: Rustam Luftfullin

30 August 2024 Semifinal	Pakhtakor	0 – 0 (3 – 4 p)	Navbahor	Tashkent
19:00 UZT (UTC+5)	Adkhamzoda (yellow card) 43'; Alijonov (yellow card) 55'; Buriev (yellow card) 109'	Report	Iskanderov (yellow card) 15'; Ivanović (yellow card) 30'; Nikabadze (yellow card) 33'; Sayfiev (red card) 90+2'	Stadium: JAR Stadium; Attendance: 6,211; Referee: Rustam Luftfullin
	Penalties
	Jurakuziev (penalty scored); Khoshimov (penalty scored); Ibrokhimov (penalty missed); Ćeran (penalty missed); Azmiddinov (penalty scored)		Ivanović (penalty missed); Đokić (penalty scored); Iminjonov (penalty scored); Hamrobekov (penalty scored); Iskanderov (penalty scored)

=== AFC Champions League Elite ===
==== League stage ====
Pos	Team	Pld	W	D	L	GF	GA	GD	Pts	Qualification
1	(Saudi Arabia) Al-Hilal	8	7	1	0	26	7	+19	22	Advance to round of 16
2	(Saudi Arabia) Al-Ahli	8	7	1	0	21	8	+13	22	Advance to round of 16
3	(Saudi Arabia) Al-Nassr	8	5	2	1	17	6	+11	17	Advance to round of 16
4	(Qatar) Al-Sadd	8	3	3	2	10	9	+1	12	Advance to round of 16
5	(United Arab Emirates) Al Wasl	8	3	2	3	8	12	−4	11	Advance to round of 16
6	(Iran) Esteghlal	8	2	3	3	8	9	−1	9	Advance to round of 16
7	(Qatar) Al-Rayyan	8	2	2	4	8	12	−4	8	Advance to round of 16
8	(Uzbekistan) Pakhtakor	8	1	4	3	4	6	−2	7	Advance to round of 16
9	(Iran) Persepolis	8	1	4	3	6	10	−4	7	
10	(Qatar) Al-Gharafa	8	2	1	5	10	18	−8	7	
11	(Iraq) Al-Shorta	8	1	3	4	7	17	−10	6	
12	(United Arab Emirates) Al Ain	8	0	2	6	11	22	−11	2	

Source: Asian Football Confederation
Rules for classification: 1) points; 2) goal difference; 3) number of goals scored; 4) number of matches won; 5) penalty shoot-out if only two teams remain tied and played each other on the final matchday 6) fair play ranking; 7) drawing of lots

17 September 2024 1	Pakhtakor (Uzbekistan)	0 – 1	(United Arab Emirates) Al Wasl	Tashkent, Uzbekistan
19:00 UZT (UTC+5)		Report	Bouftini 64'	Stadium: JAR Stadium; Attendance: 3,750; Referee: Yusuke Araki (Japan)
Note: Pakhtakor played their home matches at JAR Stadium, Tashkent, instead of their regular home stadium Pakhtakor Central Stadium, Tashkent

30 September 2024 2	Persepolis (Iran)	1 – 1	(Uzbekistan) Pakhtakor	Shahr-e Qods, Iran
21:30 UZT (UTC+5)	Alipour 1'	Report	D. Ćeran 59'	Stadium: Shahr-e Qods Stadium; Attendance: 6,942; Referee: Abdullah Jamali (Kuwait)

21 October 2024 3	Al-Shorta (Iraq)	0 – 0	(Uzbekistan) Pakhtakor	Karbala, Iraq
21:00 UZT (UTC+5)		Report		Stadium: Karbala International Stadium; Attendance: 7,500; Referee: Ma Ning (China)
Note: Al-Shorta played their home matches at Karbala International Stadium, Karbala, instead of their regular home stadium Al-Shaab Stadium, Baghdad.

5 November 2024 4	Pakhtakor (Uzbekistan)	0 – 1	(Qatar) Al-Rayyan	Tashkent, Uzbekistan
19:00 UZT (UTC+5)		Report	Shehata 51'	Stadium: JAR Stadium; Attendance: 2,142; Referee: Jumpei Iida (Japan)
Note: Pakhtakor played their home matches at JAR Stadium, Tashkent, instead of their regular home stadium Pakhtakor Central Stadium, Tashkent

25 November 2024 5	Esteghlal (Iran)	0 – 0	(Uzbekistan) Pakhtakor	Dubai, United Arab Emirates
23:30 UZT (UTC+5)		Report		Stadium: Rashid Stadium; Attendance: 1,208; Referee: Qasim Al Hatmi (Oman)
Note: Iranian clubs were required to play their home matches at neutral venues due to security concerns relating to the October 2024 Israeli strikes on Iran.

3 December 2024 6	Pakhtakor (Uzbekistan)	1 – 1	(United Arab Emirates) Al Ain	Tashkent, Uzbekistan
19:00 UZT (UTC+5)	Jurakuziev 6'	Report	Rahimi 49'	Stadium: JAR Stadium; Attendance: 1,511; Referee: Ahmad Al Ali (Kuwait)

Matches 7 & 8 took place during the 2025 season.

== Squad statistics ==
As of match played 3 December 2024

=== Appearances and goals ===
No.	Pos	Nat	Player	Total		Super League		Uzbek Cup		Super Cup		AFC Champions League Elite	
No.	Pos	Nat	Player	Apps	Goals	Apps	Goals	Apps	Goals	Apps	Goals	Apps	Goals
2	MF	(Uzbekistan) UZB	Behruzbek Askarov	23	1	10+7	1	2+1	0	1	0	1+1	0
4	MF	(Uzbekistan) UZB	Abdulla Abdullaev	21	1	13	1	2	0	0	0	6	0
5	DF	(Uzbekistan) UZB	Mukhammadkodir Khamraliev	20	1	17	1	0	0	1	0	2	0
6	FW	(Uzbekistan) UZB	Mukhammadali Urinboev	9	1	1+4	1	1	0	0	0	0+3	0
7	DF	(Uzbekistan) UZB	Khojiakbar Alijonov	21	0	11+3	0	2	0	0	0	5	0
8	MF	(Uzbekistan) UZB	Diyor Kholmatov	29	2	16+7	2	1+1	0	1	0	3	0
9	MF	(Uzbekistan) UZB	Ibrokhim Ibrokhimov	7	0	2+1	0	1+1	0	0	0	0+2	0
10	FW	(Serbia) SRB	Dragan Ćeran	30	15	19+3	13	3	0	1	1	4	1
11	FW	(Uzbekistan) UZB	Pulatkhuzha Kholdorkhonov	19	0	6+9	0	1+1	0	0	0	0+2	0
12	GK	(Uzbekistan) UZB	Vladimir Nazarov	21	0	13	0	2	0	0	0	6	0
12	DF	(Uzbekistan) UZB	Sunnatilla Poyonov	1	0	0	0	1	0	0	0	0	0
15	DF	(Uzbekistan) UZB	Diyor Ortikboev	13	0	11+2	0	0	0	0	0	0	0
17	MF	(Uzbekistan) UZB	Dostonbek Khamdamov	35	6	22+2	5	6	1	1	0	4	0
18	MF	(Uzbekistan) UZB	Saidumarxon Saidnurullaev	11	0	1+6	0	3	0	1	0	0	0
22	DF	(Uzbekistan) UZB	Umar Adkhamzoda	36	2	22+1	1	6	1	1	0	5+1	0
23	MF	(Uzbekistan) UZB	Abdurauf Buriev	18	0	10	0	2	0	0	0	6	0
24	DF	(Uzbekistan) UZB	Kirill Todorov	5	0	1+1	0	2+1	0	0	0	0	0
27	MF	(Uzbekistan) UZB	Sardor Sabirkhodjaev	28	0	19	0	5	0	0	0	4	0
28	FW	(Uzbekistan) UZB	Javokhir Alizhonov	1	0	0	0	0+1	0	0	0	0	0
30	FW	(Uzbekistan) UZB	Otabek Jurakuziev	17	3	6+4	2	0+2	0	0	0	5	1
31	MF	(Uzbekistan) UZB	Mukhammadali Usmonov	20	3	5+9	3	3+1	0	1	0	0+1	0
33	MF	(Uzbekistan) UZB	Doniyor Abdumannopov	24	4	8+9	4	3	0	0	0	3+1	0
35	GK	(Belarus) BLR	Pavel Pavlyuchenko	18	0	13	0	4	0	1	0	0	0
40	MF	(Kyrgyzstan) KGZ	Kimi Merk	17	6	4+6	3	3+1	3	0	0	0+3	0
41	MF	(Uzbekistan) UZB	Diyorbek Ortiqboyev	4	0	0	0	3	0	0+1	0	0	0
44	DF	(Uzbekistan) UZB	Makhmud Makhamadzhonov	15	0	7+2	0	1	0	0	0	3+2	0
49	MF	(Uzbekistan) UZB	Dilshod Abdullayev	2	0	1	0	0+1	0	0	0	0	0
52	MF	(Uzbekistan) UZB	Nurlan Ibraimov	1	0	0	0	1	0	0	0	0	0
55	DF	(Uzbekistan) UZB	Mukhammadrasul Abdumajidov	29	1	17+2	1	4+1	0	1	0	3+1	0
77	DF	(Uzbekistan) UZB	Dilshod Saitov	11	0	7+1	0	2+1	0	0	0	0	0
88	DF	(Uzbekistan) UZB	Shakhzod Azmiddinov	29	1	17+1	0	3+1	1	1	0	6	0
99	FW	(Uzbekistan) UZB	Ulugbek Khoshimov	20	2	7+6	2	0+2	0	0	0	0+5	0
Players away on loan:
99	FW	(Uzbekistan) UZB	Abbos Ergashboev	2	0	0	0	0+1	0	0+1	0	0	0
Players who left Pakhtakor Tashkent during the season:

=== Goal scorers ===
Place	Position	Nation	Number	Name	Super League	Uzbekistan Cup	Super Cup	AFC Champions League Elite	Total
1	FW	(Serbia)	10	Dragan Ćeran	13	0	1	1	15
2	MF	(Uzbekistan)	17	Dostonbek Khamdamov	5	1	0	0	6
2	MF	(Kyrgyzstan)	40	Kimi Merk	3	3	0	0	6
4	MF	(Uzbekistan)	33	Doniyor Abdumannopov	4	0	0	0	4
5	MF	(Uzbekistan)	31	Mukhammadali Usmonov	3	0	0	0	3
5	FW	(Uzbekistan)	30	Otabek Jurakuziev	2	0	0	1	3
7	MF	(Uzbekistan)	8	Diyor Kholmatov	2	0	0	0	2
7	FW	(Uzbekistan)	99	Ulugbek Khoshimov	2	0	0	0	2
7	DF	(Uzbekistan)	22	Umar Adkhamzoda	1	1	0	0	2
7				Own goal	2	0	0	0	2
11	DF	(Uzbekistan)	55	Mukhammadrasul Abdumajidov	1	0	0	0	1
11	DF	(Uzbekistan)	5	Mukhammadkodir Khamraliev	1	0	0	0	1
11	MF	(Uzbekistan)	4	Abdulla Abdullaev	1	0	0	0	1
11	DF	(Uzbekistan)	2	Behruzbek Askarov	1	0	0	0	1
11	FW	(Uzbekistan)	6	Mukhammadali Urinboev	1	0	0	0	1
11	DF	(Uzbekistan)	88	Shakhzod Azmiddinov	0	1	0	0	1
				TOTALS	42	6	1	2	51

=== Clean sheets ===
Place	Position	Nation	Number	Name	Super League	Uzbekistan Cup	Super Cup	AFC Champions League Elite	Total
1	GK	(Uzbekistan)	12	Vladimir Nazarov	5	1	0	2	8
2	GK	(Belarus)	35	Pavel Pavlyuchenko	3	2	0	0	5
				TOTALS	8	3	0	2	13

=== Disciplinary record ===
Number	Nation	Position	Name	Super League		Uzbekistan Cup		Super Cup		AFC Champions League Elite		Total	
Number	Nation	Position	Name	Booked	Sent off (straight red)	Booked	Sent off (straight red)	Booked	Sent off (straight red)	Booked	Sent off (straight red)	Booked	Sent off (straight red)
2	(Uzbekistan)	DF	Behruzbek Askarov	2	1	0	0	0	0	0	0	2	1
4	(Uzbekistan)	MF	Abdulla Abdullaev	2	0	0	0	0	0	1	0	3	0
5	(Uzbekistan)	DF	Mukhammadkodir Khamraliev	2	0	0	0	0	0	0	0	2	0
7	(Uzbekistan)	DF	Khojiakbar Alijonov	1	0	1	0	0	0	1	0	3	0
8	(Uzbekistan)	MF	Diyor Kholmatov	1	0	0	0	0	0	0	0	1	0
9	(Uzbekistan)	MF	Ibrokhim Ibrokhimov	1	0	0	0	0	0	1	0	2	0
10	(Serbia)	FW	Dragan Ćeran	3	0	0	0	0	0	1	0	4	0
11	(Uzbekistan)	FW	Pulatkhuzha Kholdorkhonov	0	0	1	0	0	0	0	0	1	0
12	(Uzbekistan)	GK	Vladimir Nazarov	1	0	0	0	0	0	0	0	1	0
15	(Uzbekistan)	DF	Diyor Ortikboev	3	0	0	1	0	0	0	0	3	1
17	(Uzbekistan)	MF	Dostonbek Khamdamov	1	0	0	0	0	0	1	0	2	0
18	(Uzbekistan)	MF	Saidumarxon Saidnurullaev	0	0	1	0	1	0	0	0	2	0
22	(Uzbekistan)	DF	Umar Adkhamzoda	8	0	3	0	0	0	1	0	12	0
23	(Uzbekistan)	MF	Abdurauf Buriev	2	0	1	0	0	0	1	0	4	0
24	(Uzbekistan)	DF	Kirill Todorov	1	0	0	0	0	0	0	0	1	0
27	(Uzbekistan)	MF	Sardor Sabirkhodjaev	4	1	2	1	0	0	2	0	8	2
30	(Uzbekistan)	FW	Otabek Jurakuziev	1	0	0	0	0	0	1	0	2	0
31	(Uzbekistan)	MF	Mukhammadali Usmonov	0	0	0	0	0	0	1	0	1	0
33	(Uzbekistan)	MF	Doniyor Abdumannopov	1	0	0	0	0	0	0	0	1	0
35	(Belarus)	GK	Pavel Pavlyuchenko	1	0	0	0	0	0	0	0	1	0
40	(Kyrgyzstan)	MF	Kimi Merk	1	0	1	0	0	0	0	0	2	0
44	(Uzbekistan)	DF	Makhmud Makhamadzhonov	0	0	0	0	0	0	1	0	1	0
52	(Uzbekistan)	MF	Nurlan Ibraimov	0	0	1	0	0	0	0	0	1	0
55	(Uzbekistan)	DF	Mukhammadrasul Abdumajidov	1	0	0	0	0	0	0	0	1	0
88	(Uzbekistan)	DF	Shakhzod Azmiddinov	4	0	1	0	0	0	1	0	6	0
99	(Uzbekistan)	FW	Ulugbek Khoshimov	2	0	0	0	0	0	1	0	3	0
Players away on loan:
99	(Uzbekistan)	FW	Abbos Ergashboev	0	0	1	0	0	0	0	0	1	0
Players who left Pakhtakor Tashkent during the season:
			TOTALS	43	2	13	2	1	0	14	0	71	4
