= 2025 Pakhtakor FC season =

Pakhtakor Tashkent
2025 season
- President: Bobur Shodiev
- Manager: Pedro Moreira (until 7 July); Kamoliddin Tajiev (Temporary) (from 6 May)
- Uzbek League: 2nd
- Uzbekistan Cup: Champions
- AFC Champions League Elite: Round of 16 vs Al Hilal
- Top goalscorer: League: Igor Sergeev (20); All: Igor Sergeev (25)
- Highest home attendance: 7,950 vs Neftchi Fergana (13 September 2025)
- Lowest home attendance: 825 vs Olimpik-Mobiuz (2 July 2025)
- Average home league attendance: 4,012 (20 November 2025)
Home colours	Away colours

The 2025 season was Pakhtakor Tashkent's 34th season in the Uzbek League in Uzbekistan.

== Season events ==
On 4 December 2024, Pakhtakor announced the signing of Pedro Moreira to a one-year contract, with the option of a second year.

On 13 December 2024, Pakhtakor announced the signing of Bashar Resan from Qatar SC to a one-year contract, with the option of a second year.

On 24 December 2024, Pakhtakor announced that they had extended their contracts with Khojiakbar Alijonov and Mukhammadkodir Khamraliev, both for another two-seasons.

On 25 December 2024, Pakhtakor announced the return of Igor Sergeev from BG Pathum United to a one-year contract.

On 30 December 2024, Pakhtakor announced that they had extended their contract with Sardor Sabirkhodjaev for another two-seasons, and that they would play their home games at the JAR Stadium, as they did during the 2024 season, until their Central Stadium has completed renovation work.

On 10 January, Pakhtakor announced the signing of Makhmud Mukhammadjonov from Bunyodkor to a three-year contract.

On 13 January, Pakhtakor announced the signing of Jonatan Lucca from AVS to a one-year contract.

On 14 January, Pakhtakor announced the signing of Jhonatan from Rio Ave.

On 16 January, Pakhtakor announced the signing of Flamarion from Valenciennes.

On 24 January 2025, Pakhtakor announced the signing of Brayan Riascos from Qingdao West Coast.

On 6 May, Pakhtakor announced that Head Coach Pedro Moreira was taking a leave of absence due to ill health, and that Kamoliddin Tajiev would take temporary charge of Pakhtakor during that period.

On 7 July, Pakhtakor announced that they had ended their contract with Pedro Moreira and his coaching staff, as well as the contract of Jonatan Lucca.

On 9 July, Pakhtakor announced the signing of Bobur Abdikholikov, who'd most recently played for Sumgayit, on a contract until the end of the season.

On 14 July, Pakhtakor announced the signing of Khojimat Erkinov from Al Wahda, on a contract until the end of the 2026 season.

On 22 July, Pakhtakor announced the signing of Zaid Tahseen from Al-Quwa Al-Jawiya, on a contract until the end of the 2026 season.

On 29 July, Pakhtakor announced the signing of Azizbek Turgunboev from Sivasspor.

== Squad ==
As of match played 29 November 2025

No.	Name	Nationality	Position	Date of birth (age)	Signed from	Signed in	Contract ends	Apps.	Goals
Goalkeepers
1	Nikita Shevchenko	(Uzbekistan)	GK	27 November 2003 (aged 22)	Unattached	2023		2	0
12	Vladimir Nazarov	(Uzbekistan)	GK	8 June 2002 (aged 23)	Surkhon	2025		50	0
19	Jhonatan	(Brazil)	GK	8 May 1991 (aged 34)	Rio Ave	2025		13	0
Defenders
4	Zaid Tahseen	(Iraq)	DF	29 January 2001 (aged 24)	Al-Quwa Al-Jawiya	2025	2026	12	1
5	Mukhammadkodir Khamraliev	(Uzbekistan)	DF	6 July 2001 (aged 24)	Dinamo Samarqand	2023	2026	69	2
7	Khojiakbar Alijonov	(Uzbekistan)	DF	19 April 1997 (aged 28)	Academy	2017	2026	232	11
20	Abubakir Ashurov	(Uzbekistan)	DF	12 June 2003 (aged 22)	Academy	2023		0	0
22	Umar Adkhamzoda	(Uzbekistan)	DF	4 April 1998 (aged 27)	Neftchi Fergana	2024	2025	64	4
24	Kirill Todorov	(Uzbekistan)	DF	24 May 2004 (aged 21)	Academy	2023		6	1
55	Mukhammadrasul Abdumazhidov	(Uzbekistan)	DF	23 July 2004 (aged 21)	Academy	2023		64	2
77	Dilshod Saitov	(Uzbekistan)	DF	2 February 1999 (aged 26)	Nasaf	2023		66	2
Midfielders
2	Behruzbek Askarov	(Uzbekistan)	MF	8 March 2003 (aged 22)	Academy	2023		41	1
8	Diyor Kholmatov	(Uzbekistan)	MF	22 July 2002 (aged 23)	Youth Team	2020		128	8
9	Ibrokhim Ibrokhimov	(Uzbekistan)	MF	12 January 2001 (aged 24)	Olympic Tashkent	2024		39	5
10	Azizbek Turgunboev	(Uzbekistan)	MF	1 October 1994 (aged 31)	Sivasspor	2025		121	18
17	Dostonbek Khamdamov	(Uzbekistan)	MF	24 July 1996 (aged 29)	Al-Nasr	2021		210	40
20	Dilshod Abdullayev	(Uzbekistan)	MF	9 May 2005 (aged 20)	Academy	2023		10	1
21	Bashar Resan	(Iraq)	MF	22 December 1996 (aged 28)	Qatar SC	2025	2025(+1)	36	6
23	Abdurauf Buriev	(Uzbekistan)	MF	20 July 2002 (aged 23)	Olympic Tashkent	2023		47	0
27	Sardor Sabirkhodjaev	(Uzbekistan)	MF	6 November 1994 (aged 31)	Bunyodkor	2019	2026	231	13
40	Abdushukur Makhamatov	(Uzbekistan)	MF	14 September 2005 (aged 20)	Academy	2024		1	0
41	Fazliddin Zukhriddinov	(Uzbekistan)	MF	25 December 2005 (aged 19)	Academy	2024		0	0
52	Nurlan Ibraimov	(Uzbekistan)	MF	29 August 2005 (aged 20)	Academy	2023		2	0
Forwards
11	Igor Sergeev	(Uzbekistan)	FW	30 April 1993 (aged 32)	BG Pathum United	2024	2025	281	150
15	Khojimat Erkinov	(Uzbekistan)	FW	29 May 2001 (aged 24)	Al Wahda	2025	2026	16	3
18	Bobur Abdikholikov	(Uzbekistan)	FW	23 April 1997 (aged 28)	Unattached	2025	2025	10	1
50	Flamarion	(Brazil)	FW	30 July 1996 (aged 29)	Valenciennes	2025		28	6
94	Brayan Riascos	(Colombia)	FW	10 August 1994 (aged 31)	Qingdao West Coast	2025	2025	31	9
Players away on loan
3	Shakhzod Azmiddinov	(Uzbekistan)	DF	7 August 2000 (aged 25)	Academy	2020		98	4
15	Diyor Ortikboev	(Uzbekistan)	DF	6 January 2003 (aged 22)	Academy	2021		23	0
18	Saidumarxon Saidnurullayev	(Uzbekistan)	MF	13 April 2005 (aged 20)	Academy	2023		14	2
31	Mukhammadali Usmonov	(Uzbekistan)	MF	9 December 2004 (aged 20)	Academy	2023		24	4
38	Temur Odilov	(Uzbekistan)	DF	12 October 2005 (aged 20)	Academy	2023		0	0
42	Rustambek Fomin	(Uzbekistan)	MF	9 July 2005 (aged 20)	Academy	2023		0	0
44	Makhmud Mukhammadjonov	(Uzbekistan)	DF	30 June 2003 (aged 22)	Bunyodkor	2025	2027	11	1
44	Daler Tuxsanov	(Uzbekistan)	MF	11 April 2005 (aged 20)	Academy	2023		0	0
	Akbar O'ktamov	(Uzbekistan)	FW	11 February 2004 (aged 21)	Academy	2023		0	0
	Rustam Turdimurodov	(Uzbekistan)	FW	4 April 2004 (aged 21)	Academy	2022		6	0
Players who left during the season
4	Abdulla Abdullaev	(Uzbekistan)	MF	1 September 1997 (aged 28)	Khor Fakkan	2024		39	1
6	Mukhammadali Urinboev	(Uzbekistan)	FW	24 April 2005 (aged 20)	Academy	2021		42	7
11	Po'latkhoja Kholdorkhonov	(Uzbekistan)	FW	6 July 2003 (aged 22)	Academy	2021		52	4
30	Otabek Jurakuziev	(Uzbekistan)	FW	2 April 2002 (aged 23)	Olympic Tashkent	2024		34	6
40	Kimi Merk	(Kyrgyzstan)	MF	6 July 2004 (aged 21)	Kaiserslautern II	2023		25	6
47	Jonatan Lucca	(Brazil)	MF	2 June 1994 (aged 31)	AVS	2025	2025	13	0
99	Ulugbek Khoshimov	(Uzbekistan)	FW	3 January 2001 (aged 24)	Surkhon Termez	2024		27	2
	Abbos Ergashboev	(Uzbekistan)	FW	28 March 2003 (aged 22)	Academy	2022		6	1

== Transfers ==
=== In ===
Date	Position	Nationality	Name	From	Fee	Ref.
13 December 2024	MF	(Iraq)	Bashar Resan	Qatar SC	Undisclosed	
25 December 2024	FW	(Uzbekistan)	Igor Sergeev	BG Pathum United	Undisclosed	
10 January 2025	DF	(Uzbekistan)	Makhmud Mukhammadjonov	Bunyodkor	Undisclosed	
13 January 2025	MF	(Brazil)	Jonatan Lucca	AVS	Undisclosed	
14 January 2025	GK	(Brazil)	Jhonatan	Rio Ave	Undisclosed	
16 January 2025	FW	(Brazil)	Flamarion	Valenciennes	Undisclosed	
24 January 2025	FW	(Colombia)	Brayan Riascos	Qingdao West Coast	Undisclosed	
9 July 2025	FW	(Uzbekistan)	Bobur Abdikholikov	Unattached	Free	
14 July 2025	FW	(Uzbekistan)	Khojimat Erkinov	Al Wahda	Undisclosed	
22 July 2025	DF	(Iraq)	Zaid Tahseen	Al-Quwa Al-Jawiya	Undisclosed	
29 July 2025	MF	(Uzbekistan)	Azizbek Turgunboev	Sivasspor	Undisclosed	

=== Out ===
Date	Position	Nationality	Name	To	Fee	Ref.
6 February 2025	FW	(Uzbekistan)	Po'latkhoja Kholdorkhonov	Navbahor	Undisclosed	
20 February 2025	MF	(Uzbekistan)	Muhriddin Pazildinov	Khorazm	Undisclosed	
24 February 2025	FW	(Uzbekistan)	Abbos Ergashboev	Shurtan	Undisclosed	
9 March 2025	FW	(Kyrgyzstan)	Kimi Merk	Dordoi Bishkek	Undisclosed	
7 July 2025	FW	(Uzbekistan)	Mukhammadali Urinboev	Royal Antwerp	Undisclosed	

=== Loans out ===
Start date	Position	Nationality	Name	To	End date	Ref.
27 February 2025	MF	(Uzbekistan)	Behruzbek Askarov	Turan	31 December 2025	

=== Released ===
Date	Position	Nationality	Name	Joined	Date	Ref
7 July 2025	MF	(Brazil)	Jonatan Lucca	Brusque	13 March 2026	
31 December 2025	GK	(Uzbekistan)	Nikita Shevchenko	Lokomotiv Tashkent		
31 December 2025	GK	(Brazil)	Jhonatan	Athletic Club	11 February 2026	
31 December 2025	DF	(Uzbekistan)	Umar Adkhamzoda	Navbahor Namangan		
31 December 2025	MF	(Uzbekistan)	Diyor Kholmatov	Navbahor Namangan		
31 December 2025	FW	(Colombia)	Brayan Riascos	Al-Zawraa		
31 December 2025	FW	(Uzbekistan)	Bobur Abdikholikov	Nasaf		
31 December 2025	FW	(Uzbekistan)	Igor Sergeev	Persepolis	4 January 2026	

== Friendlies ==
8 January 2025	Unirea Slobozia (Romania)	0–2	(Uzbekistan) Pakhtakor	Turkey
19:00 UZT (UTC+5)		Report	Resan 16'; Khoshimov 65'

12 January 2025	Pakhtakor (Uzbekistan)	v	(Croatia) Dinamo Zagreb	Turkey
15:00 UZT (UTC+5)

12 January 2025	Turan Tovuz (Azerbaijan)	0–2	(Uzbekistan) Pakhtakor	Turkey
19:00 UZT (UTC+5)		Report	Mukhammadjonov 11'; Resan 82'

15 January 2025	Pakhtakor (Uzbekistan)	0–2	(Czech Republic) MFK Karviná	Antalya, Turkey
13:00 UZT (UTC+5)	Ortikboev (red card) 54'	Report	Ayaosi 1'; Vallo 33'

15 January 2025	Pakhtakor (Uzbekistan)	0–2	(Japan) Sanfrecce Hiroshima	Antalya, Turkey
19:15 UZT (UTC+5)		Report	Nakajima 22'; Ryo Germain 38'	Stadium: Sueno Sports Center

18 January 2025	Pakhtakor (Uzbekistan)	1–1	(Kazakhstan) Elimai	Antalya, Turkey
UZT (UTC+5)	Khoshimov 82'	Report	Mulić 29'

24 January 2025	Pakhtakor (Uzbekistan)	1–2	(Serbia) Radnički Niš	Antalya, Turkey
19:00 UZT (UTC+5)	Kholmatov 71'	Report	55'; 60'

28 January 2025	Sileks (North Macedonia)	0–0	(Uzbekistan) Pakhtakor	Antalya, Turkey
17:30 UZT (UTC+5)		Report

== Competitions ==
=== Overview ===
Competition	First match	Last match	Starting round	Final position	Record							
Competition	First match	Last match	Starting round	Final position	Pld	W	D	L	GF	GA	GD	Win %
Super League	16 March 2025	29 November 2025	Matchday 2	2nd	30	18	6	6	59	23	+36	60.00
Uzbekistan Cup	9 April 2025	29 October 2025	Group stage	Winners	7	6	1	0	23	6	+17	85.71
AFC Champions League Elite	4 February 2025	11 March 2025	Matchday 7	Round of 16	4	2	0	2	3	6	−3	50.00
Total					41	26	7	8	85	35	+50	63.41

Last updated: 29 November 2025
Source: Competitions

=== AFC Champions League Elite ===
==== League stage ====
Pos	Team	Pld	W	D	L	GF	GA	GD	Pts	Qualification
1	(Saudi Arabia) Al-Hilal	8	7	1	0	26	7	+19	22	Advance to round of 16
2	(Saudi Arabia) Al-Ahli	8	7	1	0	21	8	+13	22	Advance to round of 16
3	(Saudi Arabia) Al-Nassr	8	5	2	1	17	6	+11	17	Advance to round of 16
4	(Qatar) Al-Sadd	8	3	3	2	10	9	+1	12	Advance to round of 16
5	(United Arab Emirates) Al Wasl	8	3	2	3	8	12	−4	11	Advance to round of 16
6	(Iran) Esteghlal	8	2	3	3	8	9	−1	9	Advance to round of 16
7	(Qatar) Al-Rayyan	8	2	2	4	8	12	−4	8	Advance to round of 16
8	(Uzbekistan) Pakhtakor	8	1	4	3	4	6	−2	7	Advance to round of 16
9	(Iran) Persepolis	8	1	4	3	6	10	−4	7	
10	(Qatar) Al-Gharafa	8	2	1	5	10	18	−8	7	
11	(Iraq) Al-Shorta	8	1	3	4	7	17	−10	6	
12	(United Arab Emirates) Al Ain	8	0	2	6	11	22	−11	2	

Source: Asian Football Confederation
Rules for classification: 1) points; 2) goal difference; 3) number of goals scored; 4) number of matches won; 5) penalty shoot-out if only two teams remain tied and played each other on the final matchday 6) fair play ranking; 7) drawing of lots

Matches 1-6 took place during the 2024 season.

4 February 2025 7	Al-Gharafa (Qatar)	1–0	(Uzbekistan) Pakhtakor	Al Khor, Qatar
21:00 UZT (UTC+5)	Sano (yellow card) 21'; Sassi (yellow card) 28' (goal) 40'; Joselu (yellow card) 51'; Nani (yellow card) 74'; Díaz (yellow card) 90+2'	Report	Resan (yellow card) 24'	Stadium: Al Bayt Stadium; Attendance: 1,962; Referee: Alireza Faghani (Australia)
Note: Al-Gharafa played their home matches at Al Bayt Stadium, Al Khor, instead of their regular home stadium Thani bin Jassim Stadium, Al Rayyan.

17 February 2025 8	Pakhtakor (Uzbekistan)	2–1	(Qatar) Al-Sadd	Tashkent, Uzbekistan
19:00 UZT (UTC+5)	Riascos 18', 56'; Sabirkhodjaev (yellow card) 49' (red card) 67'; Azmiddinov (yellow card) 90+9'	Report	Al-Haydos 37' (pen.); Bounacer (yellow card) 55'; Ounas (red card) 64'	Stadium: JAR Stadium; Attendance: 5,000; Referee: Shaun Evans (Australia)
Note: Pakhtakor played their home matches at JAR Stadium, Tashkent, instead of their regular home stadium Pakhtakor Central Stadium, Tashkent.

==== Knockout stage ====
4 March 2025 Round of 16 1st leg	Pakhtakor (Uzbekistan)	1–0	(Saudi Arabia) Al-Hilal	Tashkent, Uzbekistan
21:00 UZT (UTC+5)	Flamarion 29' (yellow card) 65'; Azmiddinov (yellow card) 34'; Abdullaev (yellow card) 78'; Mukhammadjonov (yellow card) 90+7'	Report	Koulibaly (yellow card) 83'; Kanno (yellow card) 90+9'	Stadium: JAR Stadium; Attendance: 5,226; Referee: Ma Ning (China)
Note: Pakhtakor played their home matches at JAR Stadium, Tashkent, instead of their regular home stadium Pakhtakor Central Stadium, Tashkent.

11 March 2025 Round of 16 2nd leg	Al-Hilal (Saudi Arabia)	4–0 (4–1 agg.)	(Uzbekistan) Pakhtakor	Riyadh, Saudia Arabia
23:00 UZT (UTC+5)	Al-Yami 30'; Malcom 42'; N. Al-Dawsari 51' (pen.); Al-Harbi (yellow card) 59'; Al-Ghannam (yellow card) 88'; S. Al-Dawsari 90+2'	Report	Khamdamov (yellow card) 36'	Stadium: Kingdom Arena; Attendance: 24,316; Referee: Adham Makhadmeh (Jordan)

=== Super League ===
==== League table ====
Pos	Team	Pld	W	D	L	GF	GA	GD	Pts	Qualification or relegation
1	Neftchi (C)	30	19	7	4	49	24	+25	64	Qualification for AFC Champions League Elite league stage
2	Pakhtakor	30	18	6	6	59	23	+36	60	Qualification for AFC Champions League Elite preliminary stage (Note: As Uzbekistan Cup winners)
3	Nasaf	30	16	11	3	51	23	+28	59	Qualification for AFC Champions League Two group stage
4	Dinamo	30	16	10	4	47	30	+17	58	Qualification for Silk Way Cup group stage
5	Bunyodkor	30	13	10	7	48	40	+8	49	

Source: Uzbekistan Professional Football League
Rules for classification: 1) points; 2) head-to-head points; 3) head-to-head goal difference; 4) head-to-head away goals scored; 5) goal difference; 6) number of goals scored.
(C) Champions

==== Results summary ====
Overall								Home						Away					
Pld	W	D	L	GF	GA	GD	Pts	W	D	L	GF	GA	GD	W	D	L	GF	GA	GD
30	18	6	6	59	23	+36	60	12	0	3	34	10	+24	6	6	3	25	13	+12

Last updated: 29 November 2025.
Source: See Results

==== Results by round ====
Round	1	2	3	4	5	6	7	8	9	10	11	12	13	14	15	16	17	18	19	20	21	22	23	24	25	26	27	28	29	30
Ground	A	H	H	A	H	A	H	A	H	A	H	A	H	A	H	A	H	A	H	A	H	A	H	A	H	A	H	A	H	A
Result	L	L	W	L	L	W	W	L	W	W	W	D	W	D	W	W	L	D	W	W	W	D	W	W	W	W	W	D	W	D
Position	14	15	8	10	12	8	6	11	8	9	6	6	6	7	7	6	6	7	6	5	3	3	3	3	3	3	3	3	2	2

Source: See Results
A = Away; H = Home; W = Win; D = Draw; L = Loss

==== Results ====
16 March 2025 2	AGMK	2–0	Pakhtakor	Olmaliq
20:00 UZT (UTC+5)	Abdurazzoqov 17', 88'; Rustamov (yellow card) 29'; Giyosov (yellow card) 51'; Akhrorov (yellow card) 79'; Sarimsoqov (yellow card) 90'	Report	Azmiddinov (yellow card) 11'	Stadium: AGMK Stadium; Attendance: 4,812; Referee: Asker Nadjafaliev

29 March 2025 3	Pakhtakor	0–1	Dinamo Samarqand	Tashkent
15:00 UZT (UTC+5)	Resan (yellow card) 35'	Report	Khojimirzaev 61'; Ormonjonov (yellow card) 71'	Stadium: JAR Stadium; Attendance: 3,500; Referee: Gayrat Jorayev

2 April 2025 1	Pakhtakor	5–0	Mash'al	Tashkent
19:30 UZT (UTC+5)	Sergeev 13', 45+4'; Flamarion 45'; Jurakuziev 58'; Rahmatullayev 75' (o.g.); Abdullaev (yellow card) 79'	Report	Baratov (yellow card) 62'; Ochilov (yellow card) 71'; Mamatkhodzhaev (yellow card) 77'	Stadium: JAR Stadium; Attendance: 4,001; Referee: Doston Rahmonov
Note: Match originally scheduled for 7 March 2025.

6 April 2025 4	Sogdiana	2–0	Pakhtakor	Jizzakh
18:00 UZT (UTC+5)	Kakhramonov (yellow card) 24'; Dzhuraboyev (yellow card) 45+7'; Doriev 46'; Đorđević 52'	Report	Flamarion (yellow card) 24'; Lucca (yellow card) 63'	Stadium: Sogdiana Stadium; Attendance: 2,850; Referee: Ilgiz Tantashev

13 April 2025 5	Pakhtakor	2–3	Andijon	Tashkent
18:00 UZT (UTC+5)	Sergeev 67'; Resan 84'	Report	Abdumannopov 54'; Turdimurodov 60'; Uskoković 80'	Stadium: JAR Stadium; Attendance: 7,250; Referee: Nayim Qosimov

19 April 2025 6	Neftchi Fergana	0–4	Pakhtakor	Fergana
20:15 UZT (UTC+5)	Sayfiev (yellow card) 18'	Report	Adkhamzoda (yellow card) 15' (goal) 23', 45+6'; Riascos (yellow card) 18' (goal) 42'; Sergeev 45+1'; Sabirkhodjaev (yellow card) 71'	Stadium: Istiqlol Stadium; Attendance: 15,500; Referee: Temurbek Tuxtasinov

27 April 2025 7	Pakhtakor	1–0	Shurtan	Tashkent
18:00 UZT (UTC+5)	Sergeev 4'; Resan (yellow card) 54'; Nazarov (red card) 74'; Adkhamzoda (yellow card) 79'	Report	Nuriddinov (yellow card) 28'	Stadium: JAR Stadium; Attendance: 2,345; Referee: Olim Tuychibayev

3 May 2025 8	Surkhon	2–1	Pakhtakor	Termez
20:15 UZT (UTC+5)	Jumayev (yellow card) 26'; Khodzhaniyazov (penalty missed) 58'; Abdurahmonov 59'; Tursunov 65'; Kolesnichenko (red card) 76'; A.Karimov (yellow card) 90'	Report	Khamraliev (yellow card) 16' (yellow-red card) 57'; Abdumazhidov (yellow card) 76'; Sergeev 90+6'; Urinboev (yellow card) 90+6'	Stadium: Markaziy Stadium; Attendance: 8,954; Referee: Ravshan Abdivoxidov

10 May 2025 9	Pakhtakor	6–0	Bukhara	Tashkent
16:15 UZT (UTC+5)	Sergeev 22'; Urinboev 37', 49'; Resan 60'; Ibrokhimov 62'; Usmonov 90+6'	Report	Pulatov (yellow card) 34'; Ruziev (yellow card) 70'	Stadium: JAR Stadium; Attendance: 4,100; Referee: Gʻayrat Djurayev

18 May 2025 10	Qizilqum	0–3	Pakhtakor	Navoiy
21:00 UZT (UTC+5)	Jumankuziev (yellow card) 45+4'; Lobjanidze (yellow card) 63'; Kumburovic (yellow card) 69'	Report	Sergeev 21' (pen.); Abdumazhidov (yellow card) 29'; Urinboev 73'; Khamdamov 86'	Stadium: Yoshlar Stadium; Attendance: 7,533; Referee: Nayim Qasimov

25 May 2025 11	Pakhtakor	2–1	Khorazm	Tashkent
16:00 UZT (UTC+5)	Sergeev 24'; Abdullaev (yellow card) 55'; Bubanja 90+8' (o.g.)	Report	Ismoilov 5' (yellow card) 53'; Azimov (yellow card) 38'; Bobojonov (yellow card) 62'; Shaakhmedov (yellow card) 88'	Stadium: JAR Stadium; Attendance: 3,517; Referee: Toʻrabek Suyunov

14 June 2025 12	Bunyodkor	1–1	Pakhtakor	Tashkent
14:00 UZT (UTC+5)	Abdukholiqov 24' (pen.)	Report	Sergeev 57'; Buriev (yellow card) 58'; Resan (yellow card) 59'	Stadium: Milliy Stadium; Attendance: 4,836; Referee: Asker Nadjafaliyev

22 June 2025 13	Pakhtakor	2–0	Kokand 1912	Tashkent
16:00 UZT (UTC+5)	Kholmatov 17'; Saitov (yellow card) 55'; Riascos (yellow card) 90+2' (goal) 90+5'	Report	Qosimov (yellow card) 60'; Beshimov (yellow card) 82' (yellow-red card) 85'	Stadium: JAR Stadium; Attendance: 1,718; Referee: Rustam Choriyev

27 June 2025 14	Nasaf	2–2	Pakhtakor	Qarshi
20:00 UZT (UTC+5)	Norchaev 29', 62'	Report	Adkhamzoda (yellow card) 52'; Buriev (yellow card) 55'; Riascos 90'; Khamdamov 90+4'	Stadium: Markaziy Stadium; Attendance: 15,350; Referee: Temurbek Tuxtasinov

6 July 2025 15	Pakhtakor	2–0	Navbahor Namangan	Tashkent
16:00 UZT (UTC+5)	Flamarion 21'; Mukhammadjonov (yellow card) 40'; Sergeev 65'; Resan (yellow card) 83'	Report	Guedes (yellow card) 15'; Gulomov (yellow card) 41'; Komilov (yellow card) 79'	Stadium: JAR Stadium; Attendance: 5,353; Referee: Nayim Qosimov

1 August 2025 16	Mash'al	0–1	Pakhtakor	Muborak
20:00 UZT (UTC+5)	Baratov (yellow card) 64'; Sharipov (yellow card) 66'; G'anixonov (yellow card) 70'	Report	Sergeev (yellow card) 16'; Khamdamov 75'; Saitov (yellow card) 83'	Stadium: Bahrom Vafoev Stadium; Attendance: 1,350; Referee: Toʻrabek Suyunov

5 August 2025 17	Pakhtakor	1–2	AGMK	Tashkent
16:00 UZT (UTC+5)	Khamraliev (yellow card) 23'; Abdumazhidov (yellow card) 38'; Sergeev 48'	Report	Sánchez 17', 81'; Komilov (yellow card) 36'; Ahmadaliev 48'	Stadium: JAR Stadium; Attendance: 3,798; Referee: Asker Najafaliyev

11 August 2025 18	Dinamo Samarqand	1–1	Pakhtakor	Samarkand
16:00 UZT (UTC+5)	Urozov (yellow card) 5'; Friday 19'; Abdurahmonov (red card) 90'	Report	Alijonov (yellow card) 10'; Turgunboev (yellow card) 41'; Abdikholikov 85'; Buriev (yellow card) 90'; Erkinov (yellow card) 90+9'	Stadium: Dinamo Stadium; Attendance: 12,105; Referee: Temur To'xtasinov

15 August 2025 19	Pakhtakor	2–0	Sogdiana	Tashkent
19:00 UZT (UTC+5)	Ibrokhimov 14' (pen.); Abdumazhidov (yellow card) 43'; Alijonov 73'	Report	Izzatov (yellow card) 90+3'	Stadium: JAR Stadium; Attendance: 2,288; Referee: Firdavs Norsafarov

22 August 2025 20	Andijon	2–6	Pakhtakor	Andijan
19:00 UZT (UTC+5)	Toirov (yellow card) 18'; Abdumannopov (yellow card) 26'; Akinade 71'; Abdullaev 84'; Azmiddinov (red card) 90+7'	Report	Resan 3', 31'; Alijonov (yellow card) 37' (yellow-red card) 65'; Tokotayev 42' (o.g.); Ibrokhimov (yellow card) 49'; Khamdamov 89'; Riascos 90+2'; Erkinov 90+5'	Stadium: Bobur Arena; Attendance: 11,490; Referee: Nayim Qosimov

13 September 2025 21	Pakhtakor	2–1	Neftchi Fergana	Tashkent
19:00 UZT (UTC+5)	Turgunboev 11'; Flamarion (red card) 24'; Sergeev 45+7' (pen.); Jhonatan (yellow card) 77'	Report	Alibaev 39'	Stadium: JAR Stadium; Attendance: 7,950; Referee: Nayim Qosimov

19 September 2025 22	Shurtan	0–0	Pakhtakor	Gʻuzor
19:00 UZT (UTC+5)	Narzullaev (yellow card) 36'; Eshbutaev (yellow card) 90+4'	Report	Alijonov (yellow card) 44'; Khamraliev (yellow card) 79'	Stadium: G'uzor Stadium; Attendance: 1,867; Referee: Olim Tuychibayev

29 September 2025 23	Pakhtakor	1–0	Surkhon	Tashkent
19:00 UZT (UTC+5)	Buriev (yellow card) 59'; Sergeev 90'	Report	Nematkhonov (yellow card) 59'; Turdimurodov (yellow card) 63'	Stadium: JAR Stadium; Attendance: 3,200; Referee: Ibroxim Ismailov

4 October 2025 24	Bukhara	0–4	Pakhtakor	Bukhara
17:00 UZT (UTC+5)	Kulmatov (yellow card) 43'; Pulatov (yellow card) 57'; Tabatadze (yellow card) 57'	Report	Resan 28'; Flamarion 39'; Erkinov (yellow card) 57'; Adkhamzoda (yellow card) 57'; Khamdamov (yellow card) 76'; Sergeev 80', 85'; Alijonov (yellow card) 90+6'	Stadium: Buxoro Arena; Attendance: 7,350; Referee: Gʻayrat Djurayev

19 October 2025 25	Pakhtakor	3–0	Qizilqum	Tashkent
16:00 UZT (UTC+5)	Sergeev 21' (pen.), 82' (pen.); Buriev (yellow card) 40'; Tahseen 45'; Alijonov (yellow card) 90'	Report	Gofurov (yellow card) 20'; Bozorov (yellow card) 25'; Norkhonov (yellow card) 42'; Paparyha (yellow card) 50'; Kenjaev (yellow card) 51'	Stadium: JAR Stadium; Attendance: 2,152; Referee: Olim Tuychibayev

23 October 2025 26	Khorazm	0–1	Pakhtakor	Urgench
18:00 UZT (UTC+5)	Azimov (yellow card) 6'; Samiev (yellow card) 89'	Report	Adkhamzoda (yellow card) 45+1'; Ibrokhimov 77'; Tahseen (yellow card) 89'	Stadium: Xorazm Stadium; Attendance: 9,875; Referee: Toʻrabek Suyunov

3 November 2025 27	Pakhtakor	4–2	Bunyodkor	Tashkent
13:30 UZT (UTC+5)	Khamdamov 6'; Alijonov 12'; Ibrokhimov 45'; Erkinov 90+5'	Report	Krivokapić 52'; Abdukholiqov 57'	Stadium: JAR Stadium; Attendance: 2,557; Referee: Shavkat Nasibullaev

8 November 2025 28	Kokand 1912	0–0	Pakhtakor	Kokand
16:00 UZT (UTC+5)	Hakimov (yellow card) 72'; Gvazava (yellow card) 78'; Kondratyuk (yellow card) 87'	Report	Erkinov (yellow card) 43'; Resan (yellow card) 76'	Stadium: Kokand Markaziy Stadium; Attendance: 8,571; Referee: Firdavs Norsafarov

20 November 2025 29	Pakhtakor	1–0	Nasaf	Tashkent
18:15 UZT (UTC+5)	Sergeev 45+4'; Erkinov (yellow card) 64'; Khamraliev (yellow card) 83'	Report	Ćeran (yellow card) 45+4'; Abdurakhmatov (yellow card) 64'; Čolović (yellow card) 90+1'	Stadium: JAR Stadium; Attendance: 6,450; Referee: Ilgiz Tantashev

29 November 2025 30	Navbahor Namangan	1–1	Pakhtakor	Namangan
18:15 UZT (UTC+5)	Teidi (yellow card) 29'; Pedro (yellow card) 45'; Urinboev 82'; Boltaboev (yellow card) 88'	Report	Sergeev 14'; Ibrokhimov (yellow card) 58'; Resan (yellow card) 64' (yellow-red card) 64'	Stadium: Markaziy Stadium; Attendance: 2,722; Referee: Firdavs Norsafarov

=== Uzbek Cup ===
==== Group stage ====
The draw for the Group Stage of the Uzbekistan Cup took place on 25 February, and placed Pakhtakor in Group H with AGMK and Nasaf along with an unnamed qualifier.

9 April 2025 1	Pakhtakor	2–1	AGMK	Tashkent
19:30 UZT (UTC+5)	Jurakuziev 10'; Ibrokhimov (yellow card) 20'; Sabirkhodjaev (yellow card) 32'; Sergeev 75'	Report	Abdurazzoqov (yellow card) 7' (goal) 29'; Buqimjonov (yellow card) 59'; Abdurakhmonov (yellow card) 90+4'; Tukhtakhujaev (yellow card) FT	Stadium: JAR Stadium; Attendance: 1,865; Referee: Nikita Mustafin

23 April 2025 2	Navoiy FA	0–9	Pakhtakor	Navoiy
17:00 UZT (UTC+5)		Report	Resan 19'; Riascos 28'; Jurakuziev 41'; Urinboev 50', 72'; Abdumazhidov 54'; Kholmatov 77'; Saidnurullayev 88', 90+1'	Stadium: Karmana Stadium; Attendance: 898; Referee: Feruzbek Hidoyatov

13 May 2025 3	Pakhtakor	6–3	Nasaf	Tashkent
15:00 UZT (UTC+5)	Ibrokhimov 3'; Sergeev 14', 61', 85'; Abdullayev 36'; Urinboev (yellow card) 56'; Nazarov (yellow card) 72'; Mukhammadjonov 81'; Usmonov (yellow card) 90'	Report	Čolović 28'; Mozgovoy 32' (yellow card) 52'; Ćeran (yellow card) 52'; Norchaev 54'; Bakhromov (yellow card) 77'	Stadium: JAR Stadium; Attendance: 3,606; Referee: Rustam Choriyev

==== Knockout stages ====
2 July 2025 Last 16	Pakhtakor	2–1	Olimpik-Mobiuz	Tashkent
20:00 UZT (UTC+5)	Riascos 44', 81' (yellow card) 85'; Khamdamov (yellow card) 49'	Report	Rakhimov 66'	Stadium: JAR Stadium; Attendance: 825; Referee: Nikita Mustafin

26 August 2025 Quarterfinal	Pakhtakor	3–1	Mash'al	Tashkent
20:30 UZT (UTC+5)	Flamarion 10', 45' (yellow card) 29'; Sergeev 45+4'	Report	Ganikhonov (yellow card) 37'; Murtazoev 84' (pen.); Abduraymov (yellow card) 88'	Stadium: JAR Stadium; Attendance: 1,054; Referee: Xushnud Suyunboyev

25 September 2025 Semifinal	Pakhtakor	0–0 (a.e.t.) (4–2 p)	Dinamo Samarqand	Tashkent
18:00 UZT (UTC+5)	Buriev (yellow card) 51'; Adkhamzoda (yellow card) 107'; Abdumazhidov (yellow card) 117'	Report	Urozov (yellow card) 36'	Stadium: JAR Stadium; Attendance: 4,317; Referee: Doston Rahmonov
	Penalties
	Sergeev (penalty scored); Buriev (penalty scored); Ibrokhimov (penalty scored); Khamdamov (penalty scored)		(penalty missed) Stanojević; (penalty scored) Jumaboev; (penalty scored) Khojimirzaev; (penalty missed) Khalilov

29 October 2025 Final	Pakhtakor	1–0	Bukhara	Andijan
18:30 UZT (UTC+5)	Erkinov 63'; Khamraliev (yellow card) 73'; Resan (yellow card) 79'; Ibrokhimov (yellow card) 90+3'; Jhonatan (yellow card) 90+18'	Report	Čirjak (yellow card) 52'	Stadium: Bobur Arena; Attendance: 6,814; Referee: Nayim Qosimov

== Squad statistics ==
As of match played 29 November 2025

=== Appearances and goals ===
No.	Pos	Nat	Player	Total		Super League		Uzbek Cup		AFC Champions League Elite	
No.	Pos	Nat	Player	Apps	Goals	Apps	Goals	Apps	Goals	Apps	Goals
1	GK	(Uzbekistan) UZB	Nikita Shevchenko	2	0	0+2	0	0	0	0	0
2	MF	(Uzbekistan) UZB	Behruzbek Askarov	4	0	1+2	0	0+1	0	0	0
4	DF	(Iraq) IRQ	Zaid Tahseen	12	1	9+1	1	2	0	0	0
5	DF	(Uzbekistan) UZB	Mukhammadkodir Khamraliev	25	0	19+1	0	2+2	0	1	0
7	DF	(Uzbekistan) UZB	Khojiakbar Alijonov	34	2	23+3	2	4+1	0	3	0
8	MF	(Uzbekistan) UZB	Diyor Kholmatov	19	2	4+8	1	1+2	1	3+1	0
9	MF	(Uzbekistan) UZB	Ibrokhim Ibrokhimov	32	5	15+9	4	6+1	1	0+1	0
10	MF	(Uzbekistan) UZB	Azizbek Turgunboev	18	1	9+6	1	3	0	0	0
11	FW	(Uzbekistan) UZB	Igor Sergeev	38	25	26+3	20	5+1	5	1+2	0
12	GK	(Uzbekistan) UZB	Vladimir Nazarov	29	0	21+1	0	7	0	0	0
15	FW	(Uzbekistan) UZB	Khojimat Erkinov	16	3	6+7	2	2+1	1	0	0
17	MF	(Uzbekistan) UZB	Dostonbek Khamdamov	36	5	11+16	5	1+4	0	4	0
18	FW	(Uzbekistan) UZB	Bobur Abdikholikov	10	1	3+7	1	0	0	0	0
19	GK	(Brazil) BRA	Jhonatan	13	0	9	0	0	0	4	0
20	MF	(Uzbekistan) UZB	Dilshod Abdullayev	8	1	4+1	0	3	1	0	0
21	MF	(Iraq) IRQ	Bashar Resan	36	6	20+5	5	5+2	1	1+3	0
22	MF	(Uzbekistan) UZB	Umar Adkhamzoda	28	2	17+4	2	2+1	0	4	0
23	MF	(Uzbekistan) UZB	Abdurauf Buriev	29	0	14+6	0	3+2	0	3+1	0
27	MF	(Uzbekistan) UZB	Sardor Sabirkhodjaev	30	0	24+1	0	4	0	1	0
40	MF	(Uzbekistan) UZB	Abdushukur Makhamatov	1	0	0	0	0+1	0	0	0
50	FW	(Brazil) BRA	Flamarion	28	6	17+3	3	3+1	2	4	1
55	DF	(Uzbekistan) UZB	Mukhammadrasul Abdumazhidov	31	1	21+2	0	6	1	1+1	0
77	DF	(Uzbekistan) UZB	Dilshod Saitov	26	0	17+1	0	6+1	0	0+1	0
94	FW	(Colombia) COL	Brayan Riascos	31	9	6+15	4	2+4	3	3+1	2
Players away on loan:
3	DF	(Uzbekistan) UZB	Shakhzod Azmiddinov	8	0	5	0	0	0	3	0
15	DF	(Uzbekistan) UZB	Diyor Ortikboev	4	0	0+2	0	1+1	0	0	0
18	MF	(Uzbekistan) UZB	Saidumarxon Saidnurullayev	1	2	0	0	0+1	2	0	0
31	MF	(Uzbekistan) UZB	Mukhammadali Usmonov	2	1	0+1	1	0+1	0	0	0
44	DF	(Uzbekistan) UZB	Makhmud Mukhammadjonov	11	1	2+4	0	2+2	1	0+1	0
Players who left Pakhtakor Tashkent during the season:
4	MF	(Uzbekistan) UZB	Abdulla Abdullaev	18	0	11+1	0	1+1	0	4	0
6	FW	(Uzbekistan) UZB	Mukhammadali Urinboev	14	5	6+5	3	3	2	0	0
30	FW	(Uzbekistan) UZB	Otabek Jurakuziev	17	3	2+8	1	2+1	2	0+4	0
47	MF	(Brazil) BRA	Jonatan Lucca	13	0	8	0	1	0	4	0
99	FW	(Uzbekistan) UZB	Ulugbek Khoshimov	7	0	0+4	0	0+1	0	0+2	0

=== Goal scorers ===
Place	Position	Nation	Number	Name	Super League	Uzbekistan Cup	AFC Champions League Elite	Total
1	FW	(Uzbekistan)	11	Igor Sergeev	20	5	0	25
2	FW	(Colombia)	94	Brayan Riascos	4	3	2	9
3	MF	(Iraq)	21	Bashar Resan	5	1	0	6
3	FW	(Brazil)	50	Flamarion	3	2	1	6
5	MF	(Uzbekistan)	17	Dostonbek Khamdamov	5	0	0	5
5	MF	(Uzbekistan)	9	Ibrokhim Ibrokhimov	4	1	0	5
5	FW	(Uzbekistan)	6	Mukhammadali Urinboev	3	2	0	5
8	FW	(Uzbekistan)	15	Khojimat Erkinov	2	1	0	3
8	FW	(Uzbekistan)	30	Otabek Jurakuziev	1	2	0	3
8				Own goal	3	0	0	3
11	MF	(Uzbekistan)	22	Umar Adkhamzoda	2	0	0	2
11	DF	(Uzbekistan)	7	Khojiakbar Alijonov	2	0	0	2
11	FW	(Uzbekistan)	8	Diyor Kholmatov	1	1	0	2
11	MF	(Uzbekistan)	18	Saidumarxon Saidnurullayev	0	2	0	2
15	MF	(Uzbekistan)	31	Mukhammadali Usmonov	1	0	0	1
15	FW	(Uzbekistan)	18	Bobur Abdikholikov	1	0	0	1
15	MF	(Uzbekistan)	10	Azizbek Turgunboev	1	0	0	1
15	DF	(Iraq)	4	Zaid Tahseen	1	0	0	1
15	FW	(Uzbekistan)	55	Mukhammadrasul Abdumazhidov	0	1	0	1
15	MF	(Uzbekistan)	20	Dilshod Abdullayev	0	1	0	1
15	DF	(Uzbekistan)	44	Makhmud Mukhammadjonov	0	1	0	1
				TOTALS	59	23	3	85

=== Clean sheets ===
Place	Position	Nation	Number	Name	Super League	Uzbekistan Cup	AFC Champions League Elite	Total
1	GK	(Uzbekistan)	12	Vladimir Nazarov	15	3	0	18
2	GK	(Brazil)	19	Jhonatan	2	0	1	3
3	GK	(Uzbekistan)	1	Nikita Shevchenko	1	0	0	1
				TOTALS	15	3	1	19

Jhonatan & Vladimir Nazarov both played in Pakhtakor's 3-0 victory over Neftchi Fergana on 19 April 2025
Vladimir Nazarov & Nikita Shevchenko both played in Pakhtakor's 1-0 victory over Shurtan on 27 April 2025

=== Disciplinary record ===
Number	Nation	Position	Name	Super League		Uzbekistan Cup		AFC Champions League Elite		Total	
Number	Nation	Position	Name	Booked	Sent off (straight red)	Booked	Sent off (straight red)	Booked	Sent off (straight red)	Booked	Sent off (straight red)
4	(Iraq)	DF	Zaid Tahseen	1	0	0	0	0	0	1	0
5	(Uzbekistan)	DF	Mukhammadkodir Khamraliev	5	1	1	0	0	0	6	1
7	(Uzbekistan)	DF	Khojiakbar Alijonov	6	1	1	0	0	0	7	1
9	(Uzbekistan)	MF	Ibrokhim Ibrokhimov	2	0	2	0	0	0	4	0
10	(Uzbekistan)	MF	Azizbek Turgunboev	1	0	0	0	0	0	1	0
11	(Uzbekistan)	FW	Igor Sergeev	1	0	0	0	0	0	1	0
12	(Uzbekistan)	GK	Vladimir Nazarov	0	1	1	0	0	0	1	1
15	(Uzbekistan)	FW	Khojimat Erkinov	4	0	0	0	0	0	4	0
17	(Uzbekistan)	MF	Dostonbek Khamdamov	1	0	1	0	1	0	3	0
19	(Brazil)	GK	Jhonatan	1	0	1	0	0	0	2	0
21	(Iraq)	MF	Bashar Resan	7	1	1	0	1	9	1	
22	(Uzbekistan)	MF	Umar Adkhamzoda	5	0	1	0	0	0	6	0
23	(Uzbekistan)	MF	Abdurauf Buriev	5	0	0	0	0	0	5	0
27	(Uzbekistan)	MF	Sardor Sabirkhodjaev	1	0	1	0	1	1	3	1
50	(Brazil)	FW	Flamarion	1	1	1	0	0	0	2	1
55	(Uzbekistan)	DF	Mukhammadrasul Abdumazhidov	4	0	1	0	0	0	5	0
77	(Uzbekistan)	DF	Dilshod Saitov	2	0	0	0	0	0	2	0
94	(Colombia)	FW	Brayan Riascos	2	0	1	0	0	0	3	0
Players away on loan:
3	(Uzbekistan)	DF	Shakhzod Azmiddinov	1	0	0	0	2	0	3	0
31	(Uzbekistan)	MF	Mukhammadali Usmonov	0	0	1	0	0	0	1	0
44	(Uzbekistan)	DF	Makhmud Mukhammadjonov	1	0	0	0	1	0	2	0
Players who left Pakhtakor Tashkent during the season:
4	(Uzbekistan)	MF	Abdulla Abdullaev	2	0	0	0	1	0	3	0
6	(Uzbekistan)	FW	Mukhammadali Urinboev	1	0	1	0	0	0	2	0
47	(Brazil)	MF	Jonatan Lucca	1	0	0	0	0	0	1	0
			TOTALS	55	5	15	0	7	1	77	6
