= 2025 Uzbekistan Cup final =

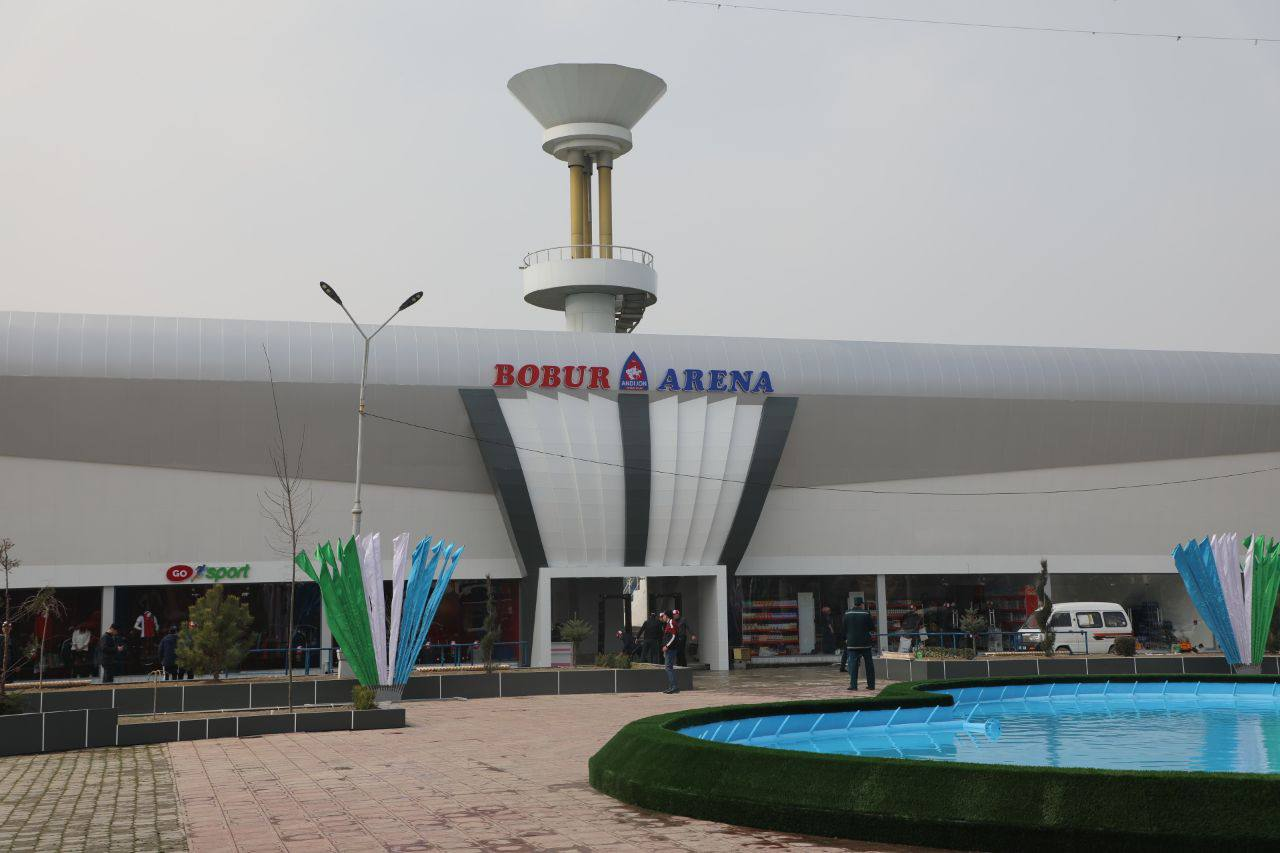
- Bobur Arena
- Event: 2025 Uzbekistan Cup
Pakhtakor	Bukhara
1	0
- Report
- Date: 29 October 2025
- Venue: Bobur Arena, Andijan
- Referee: Nayim Qosimov
- Attendance: 6,814

The 2025 Uzbekistan Cup final (Uzbek: Футбол бўйича 2025-йилги Ўзбекистон Кубоги финали) was the 34rd final of the Uzbekistan Cup. The match was played on 29 October 2025, Wednesday, at the Bobur Arena in Andijan, with Pakhtakor winning their 14th title with a score of 1–0 over Bukhara.

== Route to the final ==
=== Pakhtakor ===
Pakhtakor's route to the final
	Opponent	Result
1	AGMK	2–1
2	Navoiy FA	9–0
3	Nasaf	6–3
R16	Olimpik-Mobiuz	2–1
QF	Mash'al	3–1
SF	Dinamo Samarqand	0–0 (a.e.t.) (4–2 p)

On 25 September, Pakhtakor qualified for their 18th Cup Final, after defeating Dinamo Samarqand 4-2 on penalties after initially playing out a 0-0 draw.

=== Bukhara ===
Bukhara's route to the final
	Opponent	Result
1	Bunyodkor	0–1
2	Lokomotiv Tashkent	2–0
3	Namangan FA	5–0
R16	AGMK	3–1
QF	Bunyodkor	3–2
SF	Sogdiana	3–2 (a.e.t.)

On 25 September, Bukhara defeated Sogdiana 3-2 after extra time, to qualify for the Cup Final for the first time in their 36-year history.

== Pre-match ==
On 17 October, Pakhtakor were designated as the home team for the final due to their better performance in the Uzbekistan Super League, and would wear their dark blue kit, whilst Bukhara would wear their white kit.

On 24 October, it was announced that Nayim Qosimov would be the referee for the match.

== Match ==
29 October 2025
18:30 UZT (UTC+5)

Pakhtakor	1–0	Bukhara
Erkinov 63'	Report

Bobur Arena, Andijan
Attendance: 6,814
Referee: Nayim Qosimov

Pakhtakor	Bukhara

GK	12	(Uzbekistan) Vladimir Nazarov
DF	5	(Uzbekistan) Mukhammadkodir Khamraliev	(yellow card) 73'
DF	7	(Uzbekistan) Khojiakbar Alijonov
DF	55	(Uzbekistan) Mukhammadrasul Abdumajidov
DF	77	(Uzbekistan) Dilshod Saitov
MF	10	(Uzbekistan) Azizbek Turgunboev		(substituted off) 72'
MF	23	(Uzbekistan) Abdurauf Buriev
MF	27	(Uzbekistan) Sardor Sabirkhodjaev (c)
FW	11	(Uzbekistan) Igor Sergeev		(substituted off) 89'
FW	15	(Uzbekistan) Khojimat Erkinov		(substituted off) 81'
FW	50	(Brazil) Flamarion		(substituted off) 81'
Substitutions:
GK	19	(Brazil) Jhonatan	(yellow card) 90+18'
DF	2	(Uzbekistan) Bekhruz Askarov
MF	9	(Uzbekistan) Ibrokhim Ibrokhimov	(yellow card) 90+3'	(substituted on) 81'
MF	17	(Uzbekistan) Dostonbek Khamdamov		(substituted on) 81'
FW	18	(Uzbekistan) Bobur Abdikholikov
MF	20	(Uzbekistan) Dilshod Abdullayev
MF	21	(Iraq) Bashar Resan	(yellow card) 79'	(substituted on) 72'
DF	22	(Uzbekistan) Umar Adkhamzoda
FW	94	(Colombia) Brayan Riascos		(substituted on) 89'
Coach:
(Uzbekistan) Kamoliddin Tajiev

GK	21	(Uzbekistan) Otabek Boymurodov
DF	2	(Uzbekistan) Izzatillo Pulatov
DF	5	(Uzbekistan) Sardor Kulmatov
DF	93	(Serbia) Marko Kolaković (c)
DF	94	(Croatia) Frane Ikić
MF	17	(Uzbekistan) Javokhir Ruziev
MF	25	(Croatia) Frane Čirjak	(yellow card) 52'	(substituted off) 76'
MF	27	(Uzbekistan) Muhammad Yuldashev		(substituted off) 76'
MF	97	(Uzbekistan) Shakhboz Jurabekov		(substituted off) 64'
FW	10	(Uzbekistan) Azizbek Amonov
FW	22	(Georgia (country)) Toma Tabatadze
Substitutions:
GK	1	(Uzbekistan) Shirinboy Abdullaev
MF	6	(Uzbekistan) Ravshan Khayrullaev		(substituted on) 76'
MF	8	(Uzbekistan) Anvarjon Juraev
FW	9	(Uzbekistan) Amirbek Saidov
FW	11	(Uzbekistan) Ibrohim Numonov
MF	19	(Uzbekistan) Bilol Tupliev
DF	33	(Croatia) Josip Tomašević		(substituted on) 76'
FW	88	(Bosnia and Herzegovina) Dominik Begić		(substituted on) 64'
DF	95	(Uzbekistan) Nodirbek Ahmadjonov
Coach:
(Russia) Aleksandr Khomyakov

Player of the Match: Khojiakbar Alijonov

Assistant referees:
Zufar Eliboyev
Farhod Usmonov
Fourth official:
Timur Tokhtasinov
Video assistant referee:
Asker Najafaliyev
Assistant video assistant referee:
Anvar Marajabov
Match commissioner:
Jalolkhon Inogomkhujaev

Match rules

- 90 minutes
- 30 minutes of extra time if necessary
- Penalty shoot-out if scores still level
- Nine named substitutes
- Maximum of five substitutions, with a sixth allowed in extra time (Note: Each team was given only three opportunities to make substitutions, with a fourth opportunity in extra time, excluding substitutions made at half-time, before the start of extra time and at half-time in extra time.)
