= 2024 Uzbekistan Super Cup =

- Event: Uzbekistan Super Cup
Pakhtakor	Nasaf
(Uzbekistan)	(Uzbekistan)
1	1
- extra time was played as per the rules and Nasaf won 4–3 on penalties.
- Date: 29 May 2024
- Venue: Bunyodkor Stadium, Tashkent
- Man of the Match: Abduvohid Nematov (Nasaf)
- Referee: Aziz Asimov (Uzbekistan)
- Weather: Cloudy; 25 °C (77 °F); 45% humidity

2024 Uzbekistan Super Cup (Футбол бўйича 2024–йилги Ўзбекистон Суперкубоги) was the 9th season of the Uzbekistan Super Cup, an annual football match held between the winners of the previous season's Super League and Cup. Pakhtakor Tashkent participated as the 2023 Super League champion, and Nasaf as the Cup champion. The match was officiated by Aziz Asimov, who had also refereed the previous edition. Goals from Dragan Ćeran for Pakhtakor and Sharof Mukhiddinov for Nasaf resulted in a 1–1 draw. According to tournament rules, the match proceeded directly to a penalty shoot-out, which Nasaf won 4–3. It marked Nasaf's third Super Cup title in their history.

== Host and officials ==
The match was held at Bunyodkor Stadium in Tashkent, a neutral venue for both teams. Aziz Asimov was appointed the main referee.

== Match details ==
May 29, 2024
19:00 UZT (UTC+5)

Pakhtakor	1–1	Nasaf
Ćeran 55' (pen.)	Report	Muhiddinov 80'
Penalties
Ćeran (penalty missed) Azmiddinov (penalty scored) Adhamzoda (penalty scored) Hamdamov (penalty scored) Xolmatov (penalty missed) Hamroliyev (penalty missed)	3–4	(penalty missed) Muhiddinov (penalty scored) Siddiqov (penalty scored) Mozgovoy (penalty missed) Nasrullayev (penalty scored) Neʼmatov (penalty scored) da Silva

Bunyodkor Stadium, Tashkent
Referee: Aziz Asimov (Uzbekistan)

Pakhtakor
		Players
GK	35	(Ukraine) Pavel Pavlyuchenko
DF	2	(Uzbekistan) Bekhruz Askarov			(substituted off) 85'
DF	3	(Uzbekistan) Shakhzod Azmiddinov
DF	5	(Uzbekistan) Mukhammadkodir Khamraliev
MF	8	(Uzbekistan) Diyor Kholmatov
FW	10	(Uzbekistan) Dragan Ćeran	55' (pen.)	(yellow card) 54'
MF	17	(Uzbekistan) Dostonbek Khamdamov
FW	18	(Uzbekistan) Saidumarkhon Saidnurullaev
DF	22	(Uzbekistan) Umar Adkhamzoda
FW	31	(Uzbekistan) Mukhammadali Usmonov			(substituted off) 90'
FW	55	(Uzbekistan) Mukhammadrasul Abdumajidov
Substitutions:
GK	12	(Uzbekistan) Vladimir Nazarov
MF	14	(Uzbekistan) Nurlan Ibraimov
DF	15	(Uzbekistan) Diyor Ortikboev			(substituted on) 85'
DF	19	(Uzbekistan) Sunnatilla Poyonov
DF	20	(Uzbekistan) Dilshod Abdullaev
DF	21	(Uzbekistan) Kirill Todorov
MF	29	(Uzbekistan) Muhriddin Fazliddinov
FW	99	(Uzbekistan) Abbos Ergashboev			(substituted on) 90'
Coach:
(Uzbekistan) / (Ukraine) Maksim Shatskikh

Nasaf
		Players
GK	35	(Uzbekistan) Abduvohid Nematov
DF	7	(Uzbekistan) Akmal Mozgovoy
DF	8	(Uzbekistan) Zafarmurod Abdurakhmatov			(substituted off) 74'
MF	14	(Uzbekistan) Sharof Mukhiddinov	80'
MF	27	(Uzbekistan) Islom Kenjabaev		(yellow card) 68'	(substituted off) 74'
DF	28	(Uzbekistan) Shukhrat Mukhammadiev
FW	32	(Serbia) Zoran Marušić			(substituted off) 74'
MF	70	(Georgia (country)) Jaba Jighauri			(substituted off) 74'
MF	77	(Uzbekistan) Oybek Bozorov
MF	88	(Serbia) Marko Stanojević			(substituted off) 83'
DF	34	(Uzbekistan) Sherzod Nasrullaev
Substitutions:
GK	1	(Uzbekistan) Umidjon Ergashev
DF	2	(Uzbekistan) Alibek Davronov
DF	6	(Uzbekistan) Murodbek Rahmatov			(substituted on) 74'
MF	9	(Uzbekistan) Javohir Sidikov			(substituted on) 83'
FW	10	(Uzbekistan) Bobur Abdikholiqov			(substituted on) 74'
FW	20	(Brazil) Victor da Silva			(substituted on) 74'
MF	21	(Uzbekistan) Doniyor Narzullaev
DF	22	(Uzbekistan) Igor Golban
MF	30	(Georgia (country)) Temur Chogadze			(substituted on) 74'
Coach:
(Uzbekistan) Ruziqul Berdiev

Assistant referees:
Sanjar Shoyusupov
Alisher Usmonov
Fourth official:
Abdurashid Khudoyberganov
Video assistant referee:
Ahrol Risqullayev
Assistant VAR:
Andrey Sapenko

Match Rules

90 minutes of regular time.

If tied, no extra time; penalty shoot-out follows immediately. Seven substitutes allowed on bench. Maximum of five substitutions.
