= Makhmud Makhamadzhonov =

Uzbek footballer (born 2003

- Makhamadzhonov in 2023

Personal information
- Full name: Mahmudjon Murodjon oʻgʻli Mahamadjonov
- Date of birth: 30 June 2003 (age 23)
- Place of birth: Tashkent, Uzbekistan
- Height: 1.81 m (5 ft 11 in)
- Position: Left-back

Team information
- Current team: Dynamo Makhachkala
- Number: 23

Youth career
- Bunyodkor

Senior career*
Years	Team	Apps	(Gls)
2022–2024	Bunyodkor	36	(2)
2024	→ Pakhtakor (loan)	9	(0)
2025	Pakhtakor	6	(0)
2025	→ Dinamo Samarqand (loan)	13	(1)
2026	Andijon	19	(0)
2026–	Dynamo Makhachkala	8	(0)

International career^{‡}
2022	Uzbekistan U19	4	(0)
2022–2023	Uzbekistan U20	14	(1)
2023–2025	Uzbekistan U23	22	(1)
2026–	Uzbekistan	5	(0)
- * Club domestic league appearances and goals as of 22 November 2026 ‡ National team caps and goals as of 17 November 2026

Makhmud Makhamadzhonov (Uzbek: Mahmudjon Murodjon oʻgʻli Mahamadjonov, Махмуджон Муроджон ўғли Махамаджонов; born 30 June 2003) is an Uzbek football player who plays as a left-back for Russian Premier League club Dynamo Makhachkala and the Uzbekistan national team.

== Club career ==
On 4 September 2026, Makhamadzhonov signed a long-term contract with Russian Premier League club Dynamo Makhachkala. He made his RPL debut for Dynamo on 6 September 2026 in a game against Rodina Moscow.

== International career ==
Makhamadzhonov represented Uzbekistan Under-20 at the 2023 AFC U-20 Asian Cup, which Uzbekistan won and the 2023 FIFA U-20 World Cup, where Uzbekistan reached the round of 16. With the Uzbekistan Under-23 team, he reached the finals at the 2024 AFC U-23 Asian Cup and took the bronze at the 2022 Asian Games.

On 24 September 2026, Makhamadzhonov made his debut for the Uzbekistan national team in a friendly against Iran.

== Career statistics ==
As of 22 November 2026

Club	Season	League			Cup		Continental		Total	
Club	Season	Division	Apps	Goals	Apps	Goals	Apps	Goals	Apps	Goals
Bunyodkor	2022	Uzbekistan Super League	11	0	1	0	—		12	0
Bunyodkor	2023	Uzbekistan Super League	14	1	2	0	—		16	1
Bunyodkor	2024	Uzbekistan Super League	11	1	1	0	—		12	1
Bunyodkor	Total		36	2	4	0	0	0	40	2
Pakhtakor (loan)	2024	Uzbekistan Super League	9	0	1	0	5 (Note: Appearances in AFC Champions League Elite)	0	15	0
Pakhtakor	2025	Uzbekistan Super League	6	0	4	0	1	0	11	0
Dinamo Samarqand (loan)	2025	Uzbekistan Super League	13	1	1	0	—		14	1
Andijon	2026	Uzbekistan Super League	19	0	3	0	—		22	0
Dynamo Makhachkala	2026–27	Russian Premier League	8	0	2	0	—		10	0
Career total			91	3	15	0	6	0	112	3

== Honours ==
Pakhtakor

- Uzbekistan Cup: 2025

Uzbekistan U20

- AFC U-20 Asian Cup: 2023
