= Mukhammadrasul Abdumajidov =

Uzbek footballer

Muhammadrasul Abdumajidov
Personal information
- Date of birth: 23 July 2004 (age 22)
- Place of birth: Uzbekistan
- Height: 1.90 m (6 ft 3 in)
- Position: Centre-back

Team information
- Current team: Pakhtakor
- Number: 55

Youth career
- –2023: Pakhtakor

Senior career*
Years	Team	Apps	(Gls)
2023–	Pakhtakor	99	(7)

International career^{‡}
2025–	Uzbekistan U23	7	(0)
2026–	Uzbekistan	1	(0)
- * Club domestic league appearances and goals as of 9 November 2026 ‡ National team caps and goals as of 9 November 2026

Muhammadrasul Abdumajidov (Uzbek: Муҳаммадрасул Абдумажидов; born 23 July 2004) is an Uzbek professional footballer who plays as a centre-back for Uzbekistan Super League club Pakhtakor and the Uzbekistan national team.

== Club career ==
Standing at 1.90 m (6 ft 3 in), Abdumajidov plays primarily as a centre-back. He established himself as a key defender for Pakhtakor Tashkent during the 2026 Uzbekistan Super League season and featured in the AFC Champions League Two.

== International career ==
Abdumajidov represented the Uzbekistan U23 team starting in 2025, earning 7 caps. On 6 October 2026, he made his senior international debut for the Uzbekistan national team as a second-half substitute in a friendly match against South Korea. In November 2026, he was called up by head coach Fabio Cannavaro for the national team's training camp ahead of international fixtures.

== Honours ==
Pakhtakor Tashkent

- Uzbekistan Super League: 2023
- Uzbekistan Cup: 2025
- Uzbekistan Super Cup runner-up: 2023, 2024
