= Brayan Riascos =

Colombian footballer (born 1994)

Personal information
- Full name: José Brayan Riascos Valencia
- Date of birth: 10 August 1994 (age 32)
- Place of birth: Buenaventura, Colombia
- Height: 1.80 m (5 ft 11 in)
- Position: Forward

Team information
- Current team: Al-Hussein
- Number: 94

Youth career
- 2013–2014: Corinthians

Senior career*
Years	Team	Apps	(Gls)
2013–2016	Corinthians	0	(0)
2013	→ Flamengo-SP (loan)	17	(5)
2014	→ Trofense (loan)	32	(9)
2015	→ Flamengo-SP (loan)	14	(2)
2015	→ Bragantino (loan)	2	(0)
2016	Atlético Huila	5	(0)
2017	Famalicão	3	(0)
2017–2018	Oliveirense	40	(14)
2018–2021	Nacional	84	(22)
2021–2024	Metalist Kharkiv	18	(6)
2022	→ Grasshoppers (loan)	8	(1)
2022	→ Al-Khaleej (loan)	6	(0)
2023	→ Marítimo (loan)	16	(3)
2023–2024	→ Gaziantep (loan)	18	(2)
2024	Qingdao West Coast	19	(6)
2025	Pakhtakor	21	(4)
2026	Al-Zawraa	20	(8)
2026–	Al-Hussein	0	(0)
- * Club domestic league appearances and goals as of 26 July 2026

José Brayan Riascos Valencia (born 10 October 1994), known as Brayan Riascos, is a Colombian professional footballer who plays as a forward for Jordanian Pro League club Al-Hussein.

== Career ==
On 7 March 2022, FIFA announced that, due to the Russian invasion of Ukraine, all the contracts of foreign players in Ukraine are suspended until 30 June 2022 and they are allowed to sign with clubs outside Ukraine until that date. On 28 March 2022, Riascos used that condition to sign with Grasshoppers in Switzerland until the end of the season.

On 12 July 2022, Riascos joined Saudi Arabian club Al-Khaleej on a one-year loan. On 23 December 2022, Al-Khaleej ended the loan early and Riascos returned to Metalist.

On 5 January 2023, Riascos joined Portuguese club Marítimo on a half-year loan.

On 4 August 2023, he joined Turkish Süper Lig club Gaziantep on a 1–year loan.

On 24 February 2024, Riascos signed with Chinese Super League club Qingdao West Coast.

On 24 January 2025, he signed with Uzbekistan Super League club Pakhtakor.

In January 2026, Riascos joined Iraq Stars League club Al-Zawraa.

== Style of play ==
Brian plays as a central striker, but can also play in other attacking positions. His strengths are physical strength and good speed.

== Career statistics ==
As of match played 29 November 2025

Appearances and goals by club, season and competition
Club	Season	League			Cup		League Cup		Continental		Other		Total	
Club	Season	Division	Apps	Goals	Apps	Goals	Apps	Goals	Apps	Goals	Apps	Goals	Apps	Goals
Flamengo-SP (loan)	2013	Série C	—		—		—		—		17	5	17	5
Trofense (loan)	2013–14	Segunda Liga	12	4	0	0	0	0	—		—		12	4
Trofense (loan)	2014–15	Segunda Liga	14	3	0	0	6	2	—		—		20	5
Trofense (loan)	Total		26	7	0	0	6	2	—		—		32	9
Flamengo-SP (loan)	2015	Série C	—		—		—		—		14	2	14	2
Bragantino (loan)	2015	Série B	2	0	0	0	—		—		—		2	0
Atlético Huila	2016	Primera A	5	0	—		—		—		—		5	0
Famalicão	2016–17	LigaPro	12	4	—		—		—		—		12	4
Oliveirense	2017–18	LigaPro	35	11	1	0	5	3	—		—		41	14
Nacional	2018–19	Primeira Liga	25	1	1	0	3	0	—		—		29	1
Nacional	2019–20	LigaPro	22	11	1	0	1	0	—		—		24	11
Nacional	2020–21	Primeira Liga	30	5	3	5	—		—		—		33	10
Nacional	Total		77	17	5	5	4	0	—		—		87	22
Metalist Kharkiv	2021–22	Ukrainian First League	15	6	3	0	—		—		—		18	6
Grasshoppers (loan)	2021–22	Swiss Super League	8	1	—		—		—		—		8	1
Al-Khaleej (loan)	2022–23	Saudi Pro League	6	0	0	0	—		—		—		6	0
Marítimo (loan)	2022–23	Primeira Liga	16	3	—		—		—		2	0	18	3
Gaziantep (loan)	2023–24	Süper Lig	18	2	1	1	—		—		—		19	3
Qingdao West Coast	2024	Chinese Super League	19	6	0	0	—		—		—		19	6
Pakhtakor	2025	Uzbekistan Super League	21	4	6	4	—		4	2	—		31	10
Career total			260	61	16	10	15	5	4	2	33	7	328	85

== Honours ==
Nacional

- LigaPro: 2017–18, 2019–20
