= Jhonatan (footballer, born 1991) =

Brazilian footballer (born 1991)

Personal information
- Full name: Jhonatan Luiz da Siqueira
- Date of birth: 8 May 1991 (age 35)
- Place of birth: São Miguel do Oeste, Brazil
- Height: 1.89 m (6 ft 2 in)
- Position: Goalkeeper

Team information
- Current team: Alverca
- Number: 91

Youth career
- 2006–2008: Guarani
- 2008–2010: Joinville

Senior career*
Years	Team	Apps	(Gls)
2010–2017	Joinville	23	(0)
2015	→ Operário (loan)	17	(1)
2017–2019	Moreirense	59	(0)
2019–2022	Vitória de Guimarães	1	(0)
2020–2022	Vitória de Guimarães B	2	(0)
2021–2022	→ Rio Ave (loan)	34	(0)
2022–2025	Rio Ave	66	(0)
2025	Pakhtakor	9	(0)
2026	Athletic Club	0	(0)
2026–	Alverca	0	(0)
- * Club domestic league appearances and goals as of 5 September 2026

Jhonatan Luiz da Siqueira (born 8 May 1991) is a Brazilian professional footballer who plays as a goalkeeper for Primeira Liga club Alverca.

== Club career ==
Born in São Miguel do Oeste, Santa Catarina, Jhonatan joined the youth setup of Guarani at the age of fifteen. Two years later, he switched to the Joinville academy and was promoted to the senior team in 2010. In 2015, he joined Operário on loan for the Campeonato Paranaense season. In March, he scored a goal against Nacional in a 2–1 away victory. During his loan spell, he went on to win the competition with the club.

On 7 July 2017, Jhonatan moved abroad and signed for Portuguese first tier club Moreirense on a two-year contract.

On 16 July 2021, he joined Rio Ave on a season-long loan.

=== Pakhtakor ===
On 14 January 2025, Jhonatan signed with Uzbekistan Super League club Pakhtakor. On 9 January 2026, Pakhtakor announced that Jhonatan was one of six players to leave after their contracts had ended.

=== Return to Portugal ===
On 23 July 2026, Jhonatan returned to Portugal and signed with Alverca.

== Career statistics ==
As of 4 March 2025

Appearances and goals by club, season and competition
Club	Season	League			State League		National Cup		League Cup		Continental		Other		Total	
Club	Season	Division	Apps	Goals	Apps	Goals	Apps	Goals	Apps	Goals	Apps	Goals	Apps	Goals	Apps	Goals
Joinville	2011	Série C	—		0	0	—		—		—		—		0	0
Joinville	2012	Série B	3	0	1	0	—		—		—		—		4	0
Joinville	2013	Série B	0	0	0	0	—		—		—		—		0	0
Joinville	2014	Série B	0	0	0	0	0	0	—		—		—		0	0
Joinville	2015	Série A	0	0	—		—		—		0	0	—		0	0
Joinville	2016	Série B	16	0	9	0	0	0	—		—		—		25	0
Joinville	2017	Série C	4	0	10	0	1	0	—		—		1	0	16	0
Joinville	Total		23	0	20	0	1	0	—		0	0	1	0	45	0
Operário (loan)	2015	Série D	—		17	1	—		—		—		—		17	1
Moreirense	2017–18	Primeira Liga	34	0	—		4	0	2	0	—		—		40	0
Moreirense	2018–19	Primeira Liga	25	0	—		0	0	1	0	—		—		26	0
Moreirense	Total		59	0	—		4	0	3	0	—		—		66	0
Vitória de Guimarães	2019–20	Primeira Liga	0	0	—		0	0	0	0	0	0	—		0	0
Vitória de Guimarães	2020–21	Primeira Liga	0	0	—		0	0	0	0	—		—		0	0
Vitória de Guimarães	Total		0	0	—		0	0	0	0	0	0	—		0	0
Vitória de Guimarães B	2020–21	Campeonato de Portugal	2	0	—		—		—		—		—		2	0
Rio Ave (loan)	2021–22	Liga Portugal 2	34	0	—		1	0	2	0	—		—		37	0
Rio Ave	2022–23	Primeira Liga	32	0	—		0	0	2	0	—		—		34	0
Rio Ave	2023–24	Primeira Liga	26	0	—		1	0	2	0	—		—		29	0
Rio Ave	2024–25	Primeira Liga	8	0	—		1	0	0	0	—		—		9	0
Rio Ave	Total		100	0	—		3	0	6	0	—		—		109	0
Pakhtakor	2025	Uzbekistan Super League	0	0	—		0	0	—		3	0	—		3	0
Career total			182	0	37	1	8	0	9	0	3	0	1	0	240	1

== Honours ==
Individual

- Primeira Liga Goalkeeper of the Month: January 2019
