= Abdulla Abdullaev =

Uzbek footballer (born 1997)

Personal information
- Full name: Abdulla Qahramonjon oʻgʻli Abdullayev
- Date of birth: 1 September 1997 (age 29)
- Place of birth: Kurgontepa, Uzbekistan
- Height: 1.83 m (6 ft 0 in)
- Positions: Defender; midfielder

Team information
- Current team: Neftchi Fergana

Senior career*
Years	Team	Apps	(Gls)
2016	Sementchi	12	(0)
2017–2021	Bunyodkor	82	(2)
2022–2023	AGMK	43	(2)
2023–2024	Khor Fakkan	21	(0)
2024–2025	Pakhtakor	25	(1)
2025–2026	Dibba	10	(0)
2026–	Neftchi Fergana		

International career^{‡}
2018	Uzbekistan U21	3	(0)
2018–2020	Uzbekistan U23	14	(1)
2021–	Uzbekistan	36	(1)
Medal record
Representing Uzbekistan
CAFA Nations Cup
Runner-up	2023 Kyrgyzstan–Uzbekistan	Team
- * Club domestic league appearances and goals as of 16 March 2025 (UTC) ‡ National team caps and goals as of 23 June 2026 (UTC)

Abdulla Kahramonovich Abdullaev (Uzbek: Abdulla Qahramonjon oʻgʻli Abdullayev, Абдулла Қаҳрамонжон ўғли Абдуллаев; born 1 September 1997) is an Uzbek professional footballer who plays for Neftchi Ferganaand the Uzbekistan national team.

== Career ==
=== International ===
Abdullaev made his debut for the Uzbekistan main team on 5 September 2021 in a Friendly match against Sweden. Named to the Uzbekistan national team squad for the 2026 FIFA World Cup.

Uzbekistan national team
Year	Apps	Goals
2021	3	0
2022	5	0
2023	5	0
2024	3	0
Total	16	0

Statistics accurate as of match played 3 February 2024.
