= Pavel Pavlyuchenko =

Belarusian footballer

Personal information
- Full name: Pavel Sergeyevich Pavlyuchenko
- Date of birth: 1 January 1998 (age 28)
- Place of birth: Mogilev, Belarus
- Height: 1.94 m (6 ft 4 in)
- Position: Goalkeeper

Team information
- Current team: Maxline Vitebsk
- Number: 1

Youth career
- 2014–2016: Dnepr Mogilev

Senior career*
Years	Team	Apps	(Gls)
2016–2017	Dnepr Mogilev	20	(0)
2017–2020	Dinamo Brest	30	(0)
2021	Rukh Brest	28	(0)
2022–2023	Bruk-Bet Termalica	10	(0)
2023	→ Górnik Zabrze (loan)	0	(0)
2023	→ Górnik Zabrze II (loan)	3	(0)
2023–2024	Pakhtakor Tashkent	18	(0)
2025–	Maxline Vitebsk	47	(0)

International career^{‡}
2015	Belarus U17	1	(0)
2016–2017	Belarus U19	6	(0)
2017–2020	Belarus U21	12	(0)
2017–	Belarus	20	(0)
- * Club domestic league appearances and goals as of 22:40, 26 September 2026 (UTC) ‡ National team caps and goals as of 21:13, 3 October 2026 (UTC)

Pavel Sergeyevich Pavlyuchenko (Belarusian: Павел Сяргеевіч Паўлючэнка; Russian: Павел Сергеевич Павлюченко; born 1 January 1998) is a Belarusian professional footballer who plays as a goalkeeper for Maxline Vitebsk and the Belarus national team. He has also played at the U17, U19 and U21 levels for Belarus.

== Career ==
Pavlyuchenko made his debut for the Belarus national team on 13 November 2017 in a friendly match against Georgia.

== Career statistics ==
=== International ===
As of match played 3 October 2026

Appearances and goals by national team and year
National team	Year	Apps	Goals
Belarus
Belarus	2017	1	0
Belarus	2018	1	0
Belarus	2019	0	0
Belarus	2020	0	0
Belarus	2021	5	0
Belarus	2022	4	0
Belarus	2023	1	0
Belarus	2024	2	0
Belarus	2025	3	0
Belarus	2026	3	0
Total		20	0

== Honours ==
Dinamo Brest

- Belarusian Premier League: 2019
- Belarusian Cup: 2017–18
- Belarusian Super Cup: 2018, 2019, 2020

Pakhtakor

- Uzbekistan Super League: 2023

Maxline Vitebsk

- Belarusian Premier League: 2025
