= Kimi Merk =

German-Kyrgyz footballer (born 2004)

Personal information
- Full name: Kimi Björn Merk
- Date of birth: 6 July 2004 (age 22)
- Place of birth: Pirmasens, Germany
- Height: 1.78 m (5 ft 10 in)
- Position: Midfielder

Youth career
- 2019–2021: 1. FC Kaiserslautern

Senior career*
| Years | Team | Apps | (Gls) |
| 2022–2023 | 1. FC Kaiserslautern II | 7 | (0) |
| 2023–2025 | Pakhtakor Tashkent | 16 | (3) |
| 2025 | Dordoi Bishkek | 12 | (5) |
| 2026– | Alga Bishkek | | |

International career^{‡}
| 2023– | Kyrgyzstan U20 | 3 | (0) |
| 2023– | Kyrgyzstan | 19 | (1) |
- * Club domestic league appearances and goals as of 11 March 2025 ‡ National team caps and goals as of March 2024

Kimi Björn Merk (Kyrgyz: Кими Бөрн Мерк; born 6 July 2004) is a professional footballer who plays as a midfielder for Alga Bishkek. Born in Germany, he represents the Kyrgyzstan national team.

His brother Kai is also a footballer.

== Club career ==
On 21 July 2023, Pakhtakor Tashkent announced the signing of Merk.

On 9 March 2025, Dordoi Bishkek announced the singing of Merk to a six-month contract. On 23 June 2025, Dordoi Bishkek announced the departure of Merk at the end of his contract, having scored five goals in twelve appearances.

== International career ==
Merk made his debut for the Kyrgyzstan main team on 12 October 2023 in a friendly match against Bahrain.

Merk scored his first international goal on 26 March 2024 against Chinese Taipei during the 2026 FIFA World Cup qualification at the Dolen Omurzakov Stadium.

== Career statistics ==
Statistics accurate as of match played 26 March 2024.

Kyrgyzstan national team
| Year | Apps | Goals |
|---|---|---|
| 2023 | 4 | 0 |
| 2024 | 4 | 1 |
| Total | 8 | 1 |

=== International goals ===
| No. | Date | Venue | Opponent | Score | Result | Competition |
|---|---|---|---|---|---|---|
| 1. | 26 March 2024 | Dolen Omurzakov Stadium, Bishkek, Kyrgyzstan | Chinese Taipei | 5–1 | 5–1 | 2026 FIFA World Cup qualification |
