= Mukhammadali Urinboev =

Uzbekistani footballer

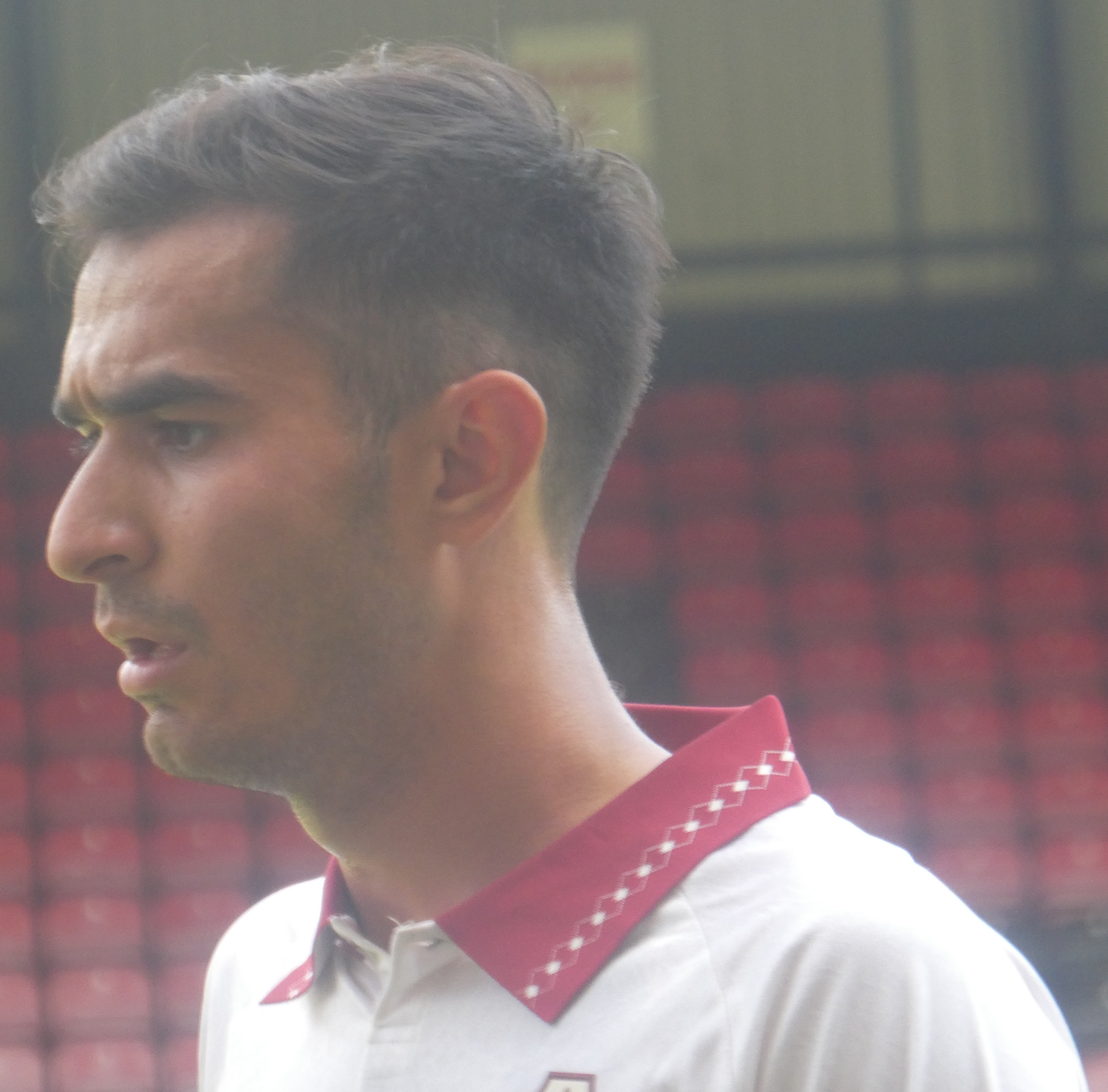

Personal information
- Full name: Mukhammadali Baxtiyor oʻgʻli Urinboev
- Date of birth: 24 April 2005 (age 21)
- Place of birth: Tashkent, Uzbekistan
- Height: 1.70 m (5 ft 7 in)
- Position: Winger

Team information
- Current team: Antwerp
- Number: 19

Youth career
- Pakhtakor

Senior career*
Years	Team	Apps	(Gls)
2021–2025	Pakhtakor	28	(4)
2024	→ Brentford (loan)	0	(0)
2025–	Antwerp	5	(0)
2025–	Young Reds Antwerp	6	(3)

International career^{‡}
2022	Uzbekistan U18	6	(1)
2024–2025	Uzbekistan U20	19	(7)
2025–	Uzbekistan U23	6	(1)
- * Club domestic league appearances and goals as of 1 June 2026 ‡ National team caps and goals as of 15 September 2026 (UTC)

Mukhammadali Urinboev (born 24 April 2005) is an Uzbekistani footballer who plays for Belgian Pro League club Antwerp.

== Career ==
=== Club ===
In October 2021, the Mukhammadali Urinboev began to pull up to games with the main team of the Tashkent club Pakhtakor. He made his debut for the Pakhtakor on 24 October 2021 in a match against Sogdiana, coming on as a substitute in the 87th minute. The footballer became the youngest debutant of the Uzbekistan Super League at the age of 16 years and 183 days. At the end of the debut season, the footballer together with the club became the winner of the Uzbekistan Super League. In July 2022, the footballer was transferred to the main team of Pakhtakor. He scored his debut goal for the club on 23 August 2022 in the 2022 Uzbekistan Cup match against Shurtan. In September 2023, the footballer played with the club at the AFC Champions League matches. The footballer played his first match at the tournament on 24 October 2023 against Turkmenistan's FC Ahal. At the end of the group stage, the footballer and his club finished in third place and finished participation in the tournament. At the end of the season, the footballer also became a three-time champion of the Uzbek Super League.

Urinboev continued his career in Brentford of the Premier League. According to the agreement between the clubs, he played on loan at Brentford until 30 June 2024. After this period, the English club had the right to buy Muhammadali. He only appeared for the reserve team during his time in England.

On 7 July 2025, Urinboev signed a four-year contract with Antwerp in Belgium.

=== International ===
In November 2022, the player was called up to the Uzbekistan U18 national team. The player made his debut in the national team on 26 November 2022, taking the captain's armband to the field in a friendly match against the Turkey U18. The footballer scored his debut goal in the national team on 8 September 2023 in a match against the Russian U18 national team.

== Personal life ==
Mukhammadali's brother Zabikhillo is also a footballer, who plays as a striker for Metallurg Bekabad and the Uzbekistan national football team.

== Career statistics ==
=== Club ===
As of match played 26 April 2026

Club	Season	League			National Cup		Continental		Other		Total	
Club	Season	Division	Apps	Goals	Apps	Goals	Apps	Goals	Apps	Goals	Apps	Goals
Pakhtakor	2021	Uzbekistan Super League	2	0	0	0	–		–		2	0
Pakhtakor	2022	Uzbekistan Super League	8	0	2	1	0	0	–		10	1
Pakhtakor	2023	Uzbekistan Super League	2	0	1	0	3	0 (Note: Appearance(s) in Asian Champions League)	–		6	0
Pakhtakor	2024	Uzbekistan Super League	5	1	–		–		–		5	1
Pakhtakor	2025	Uzbekistan Super League	11	3	3	2	3	0	–		17	5
Brentford (loan)	2024–25	Premier League	0	0	0	0	–		–		0	0
Royal Antwerp	2025–26	Belgian Pro League	5	0	0	0	–		–		5	0
Royal Antwerp	2026–27	Belgian Pro League	0	0	0	0	–		–		0	0
Royal Antwerp	Total		5	0	0	0	–		–		5	0
Young Reds Antwerp	2025–26	Belgian Division 2	6	3	–		–		–		6	3
Career total			38	7	6	3	6	0	–		50	10

== Honours ==
Individual

- AFC U-20 Asian Cup Top Goalscorer: 2025
