= Ulugbek Khoshimov =

Uzbek footballer (born 2001)

Personal information
- Full name: Ulugʻbek Rasuljon Hoshimov
- Date of birth: 3 January 2001 (age 25)
- Place of birth: Tashkent Region, Uzbekistan
- Height: 1.83 m (6 ft 0 in)
- Position: Forward

Team information
- Current team: Khorazm
- Number: 90

Senior career*
Years	Team	Apps	(Gls)
2020	Pakhtakor	1	(0)
2021–2023	Neftchi	45	(5)
2024	Surkhon	11	(1)
2024–2025	Pakhtakor	4	(0)
2025–2026	Dinamo Samarqand	17	(1)
2026–	Khorazm	3	(1)

International career^{‡}
2020–	Uzbekistan U23	26	(9)
Medal record
Men's football
Representing Uzbekistan
Asian Games
Bronze medal – third place	2022 Hangzhou	Team
AFC U-23 Asian Cup
Silver medal – second place	2024 Qatar	Team
- * Club domestic league appearances and goals as of 29 July 2026 ‡ National team caps and goals as of 26 March 2024

Ulugbek Khoshimov (Uzbek: Улуғбек Хошимов; born 3 January 2001) is an Uzbek professional footballer who plays as a forward for Khorazm.

== Club career ==
Ulugbek started his football career in "Pakhtakor" club. He spent the 2019-2020 seasons in the Pakhtakor team. Before the 2021 season, Fergananong Neftchi Club bought Hashimov from the Pakhtakor team for $20,000.

=== International career ===
At the 2022 Asian Youth Championship held in Tashkent, he scored 2 goals in 6 matches as part of the Uzbekistan Youth Team and won silver medals in the competition.

== Honours ==
"Pakhtakor"

- Uzbekistan Super League : 2020 : (1)
- Uzbekistan Cup: 2020 (1)

Neftchi

- Uzbekistan Pro-league: 2021 (1)

=== International ===
- AFC U-23 Asian Cup 2nd place: 2022
