= Diyor Kholmatov =

Uzbekistani footballer (born 2002)

Personal information
- Full name: Diyor Akmal o'g'li Xolmatov
- Date of birth: 22 July 2002 (age 24)
- Place of birth: Fergana, Uzbekistan
- Height: 1.74 m (5 ft 9 in)
- Position: Midfielder

Team information
- Current team: Navbahor
- Number: 8

Youth career
- Pakhtakor

Senior career*
Years	Team	Apps	(Gls)
2020–2025	Pakhtakor	92	(7)
2026–	Navbahor	13	(1)

International career^{‡}
2021	Uzbekistan U21	1	(0)
2021–	Uzbekistan U23	15	(0)
2023–	Uzbekistan	1	(0)
Medal record
Representing Uzbekistan
Asian Games
Bronze medal – third place	2022 Hangzhou	Team
AFC U-23 Asian Cup
Silver medal – second place	2024 Qatar	Team
- * Club domestic league appearances and goals as of 29 July 2026 ‡ National team caps and goals as of 25 December 2023 (UTC)

Diyor Akmal o'g'li Xolmatov (born 22 July 2002) is an Uzbekistani footballer who plays for Navbahor and Uzbekistan national football team.

== Career ==
=== International ===
Kholmatov made his debut for the Uzbekistan main team on 25 December 2023 in a Friendly match against Kyrgyzstan.

Uzbekistan national team
Year	Apps	Goals
2023	1	0
2024	0	0
Total	1	0

Statistics accurate as of match played 25 December 2023.
