= Abdurauf Buriev =

Uzbekistani footballer (born 2002)

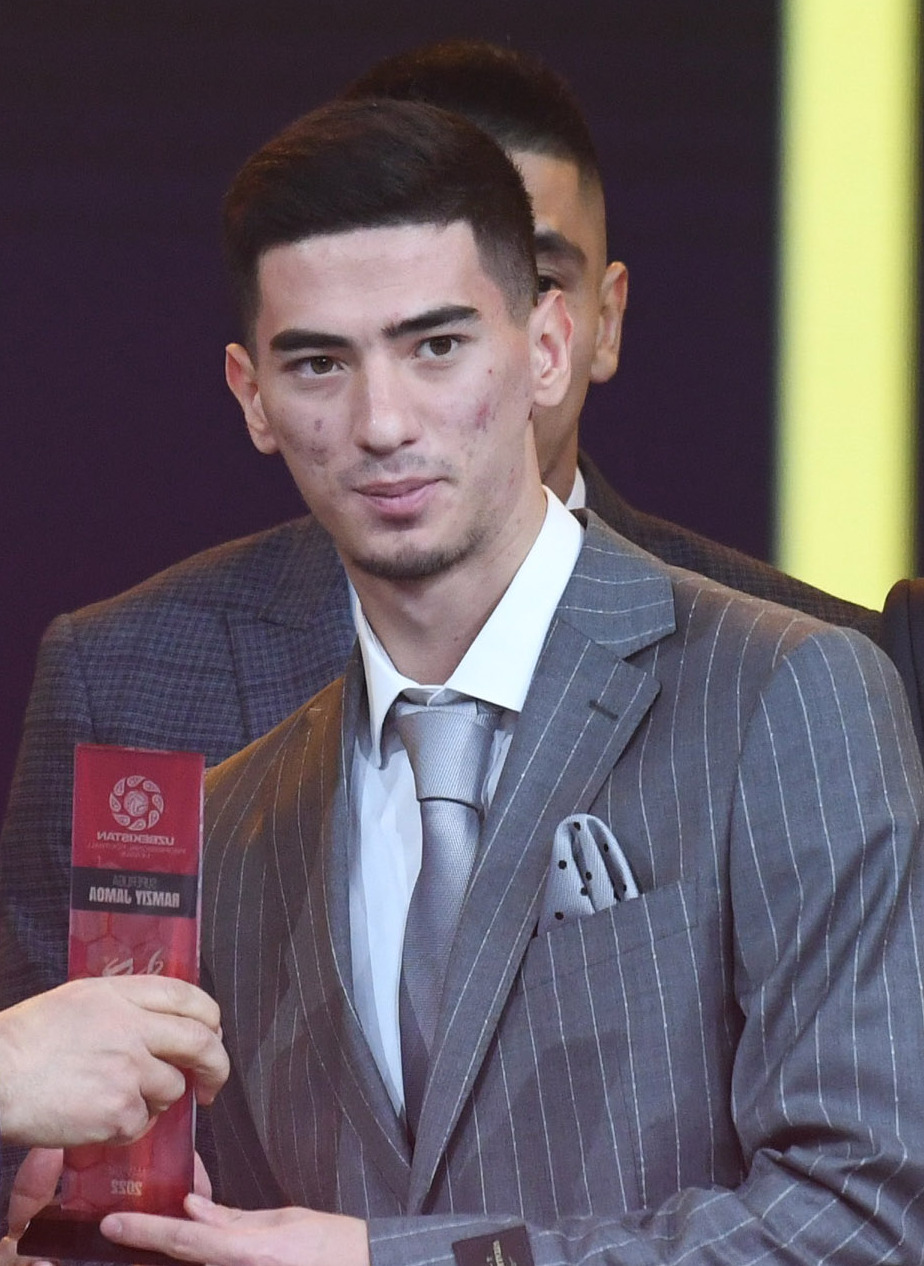

Personal information
- Full name: Abdurauf Anvar oʻgʻli Boʻriyev
- Date of birth: 20 July 2002 (age 24)
- Place of birth: Tashkent, Uzbekistan
- Height: 1.79 m (5 ft 10 in)
- Position: Midfielder

Team information
- Current team: Pakhtakor Tashkent
- Number: 23

Youth career
- Bunyodkor

Senior career*
Years	Team	Apps	(Gls)
2020	Bunyodkor-2	0	(0)
2021	→ Olympic (loan)	20	(2)
2022–2023	Olympic	43	(1)
2023–	Pakhtakor	43	(0)
2024	→ Olympic (loan)	12	(0)

International career^{‡}
2018	Uzbekistan U17	3	(0)
2021–	Uzbekistan U23	32	(0)
2025–	Uzbekistan	7	(0)
Medal record
Representing Uzbekistan
CAFA Nations Cup
Winner	2025 Tajikistan–Uzbekistan	Team
Asian Games
Bronze medal – third place	2022 Hangzhou	Team
AFC U-23 Asian Cup
Silver medal – second place	2022 Uzbekistan	Team
Silver medal – second place	2024 Qatar	Team
- * Club domestic league appearances and goals as of 28 July 2026 ‡ National team caps and goals as of 19 July 2026 (UTC)

Abdurauf Anvar oʻgʻli Boʻriyev (born 20 July 2002) is an Uzbekistani professional footballer who plays for Pakhtakor Tashkent and the Uzbekistan national team.

== Career statistics ==
=== International ===
As of match played 13 October 2025

Appearances and goals by national team and year
National team	Year	Apps	Goals
Uzbekistan	2025	7	0
Total		7	0
