= Dilshod Saitov =

Uzbekistani footballer

Personal information
- Date of birth: February 2, 1999 (age 27)
- Place of birth: Kitab, Uzbekistan
- Height: 1.78 m (5 ft 10 in)
- Position: Midfielder

Team information
- Current team: Pakhtakor Tashkent
- Number: 8

Youth career
- Nasaf-2

Senior career*
Years	Team	Apps	(Gls)
2018–2022	Nasaf	106	(11)
2023–	Pakhtakor Tashkent	50	(2)

International career^{‡}
2021–	Uzbekistan	7	(0)
Medal record
Representing Uzbekistan
CAFA Nations Cup
Runner-up	2023 Kyrgyzstan–Uzbekistan	Team
- * Club domestic league appearances and goals as of 28 July 2026 ‡ National team caps and goals as of 17 June 2023 (UTC)

Dilshod Saitov (born 2 February 1999) is an Uzbeki footballer who plays for Pakhtakor Tashkent and Uzbekistan national football team.

== Career ==
=== International ===
Saitov made his debut for the Uzbekistan main team on 9 October 2021 in a Friendly match against Malaysia.

Uzbekistan national team
Year	Apps	Goals
2021	1	0
2022	4	0
2023	2	0
Total	7	0

Statistics accurate as of match played 17 June 2023.
