= Sardor Sabirkhodjaev =

Uzbekistani footballer

Personal information
- Full name: Sardor Sabirkhodjaev
- Date of birth: 6 November 1994 (age 32)
- Place of birth: Tashkent, Uzbekistan
- Height: 1.80 m (5 ft 11 in)
- Position: Midfielder

Team information
- Current team: Pakhtakor
- Number: 27

Senior career*
Years	Team	Apps	(Gls)
2013–2015	Bunyodkor	41	(1)
2016	Sogdiana Jizzakh	10	(0)
2016	Obod Tashkent	13	(0)
2017	Shurtan Guzar	15	(1)
2017–2018	Bunyodkor	32	(2)
2019–	Pakhtakor	180	(11)

International career^{‡}
2018–	Uzbekistan	16	(0)
Medal record
Representing Uzbekistan
CAFA Nations Cup
Runner-up	2023 Kyrgyzstan–Uzbekistan	Team
- * Club domestic league appearances and goals as of 28 July 2026 ‡ National team caps and goals as of 21:52, 28 March 2023 (UTC)

Sardor Sabirkhodjaev (born 6 November 1994) is an Uzbek professional footballer who plays as a midfielder for Pakhtakor and the Uzbekistan national team.

== Career ==
=== Club ===
On 26 July 2017, FC Bunyodkor announced the return of Sabirkhodjaev.

== Career statistics ==
=== Club ===
As of match played 3 October 2018

Club	Season	League			National Cup		Continental		Other		Total	
Club	Season	Division	Apps	Goals	Apps	Goals	Apps	Goals	Apps	Goals	Apps	Goals
Bunyodkor	2013	Uzbek League	1	0	0	0	0	0	-		1	0
Bunyodkor	2014	Uzbek League	22	0	1	0	6	0	1	0	30	0
Bunyodkor	2015	Uzbek League	18	1	3	0	3	0	-		24	1
Bunyodkor	Total		41	1	4	0	9	0	1	0	55	1
Sogdiana Jizzakh	2016	Uzbek League	10	0	2	0	0	0	-		12	0
Obod Tashkent	2016	Uzbek League	13	0	0	0	0	0	-		13	0
Shurtan Guzar	2017	Uzbek League	15	1	2	0	0	0	-		17	1
Bunyodkor	2017	Uzbek League	3	0	0	0	0	0	-		3	0
Bunyodkor	2018	Uzbek League	23	1	3	0	-		-		26	1
Bunyodkor	Total		26	1	3	0	0	0	-	-	29	1
Career total			105	3	11	0	9	0	1	0	126	3

=== International ===
Uzbekistan national team
Year	Apps	Goals
2014	1	0
2015	0	0
2016	0	0
2017	0	0
2018	3	0
Total	2	0

Statistics accurate as of match played 11 September 2018
