= Mukhammadkodir Khamraliev =

Uzbekistani footballer (born 2001)

Personal information
- Full name: Muhammadqodir Abduvohid oʻgʻli Hamraliyev
- Date of birth: 6 July 2001 (age 25)
- Place of birth: Fergana, Uzbekistan
- Height: 1.86 m (6 ft 1 in)
- Position: Defender

Team information
- Current team: Pakhtakor
- Number: 5

Youth career
- Pakhtakor

Senior career*
Years	Team	Apps	(Gls)
2020–2021	Dinamo	30	(3)
2022	Olympic	25	(3)
2023–	Pakhtakor	64	(3)

International career^{‡}
2021	Uzbekistan U21	1	(0)
2021–	Uzbekistan U23	26	(2)
2023–	Uzbekistan	2	(0)
Medal record
Representing Uzbekistan
Men's football
CAFA Nations Cup
Winner	2025 Tajikistan–Uzbekistan	Team
AFC U-23 Asian Cup
Silver medal – second place	2022 Uzbekistan	Team
Silver medal – second place	2024 Qatar	Team
Asian Games
Bronze medal – third place	2022 Hangzhou	Team
- * Club domestic league appearances and goals as of 28 July 2026 ‡ National team caps and goals as of 3 February 2024 (UTC)

Mukhammadkodir Khamraliev (Uzbek: Muhammadqodir Abduvohid oʻgʻli Hamraliyev, born 6 July 2001) is an Uzbekistani footballer who plays for Pakhtakor and Uzbekistan national team.

== Career ==
=== International ===
Khamraliev made his debut for the Uzbekistan main team on 25 December 2023 in a Friendly match against Kyrgyzstan.

Uzbekistan national team
Year	Apps	Goals
2023	1	0
2024	1	0
Total	2	0

Statistics accurate as of match played 3 February 2024.
