= Vladimir Nazarov (footballer) =

Uzbekistani footballer (born 2002)

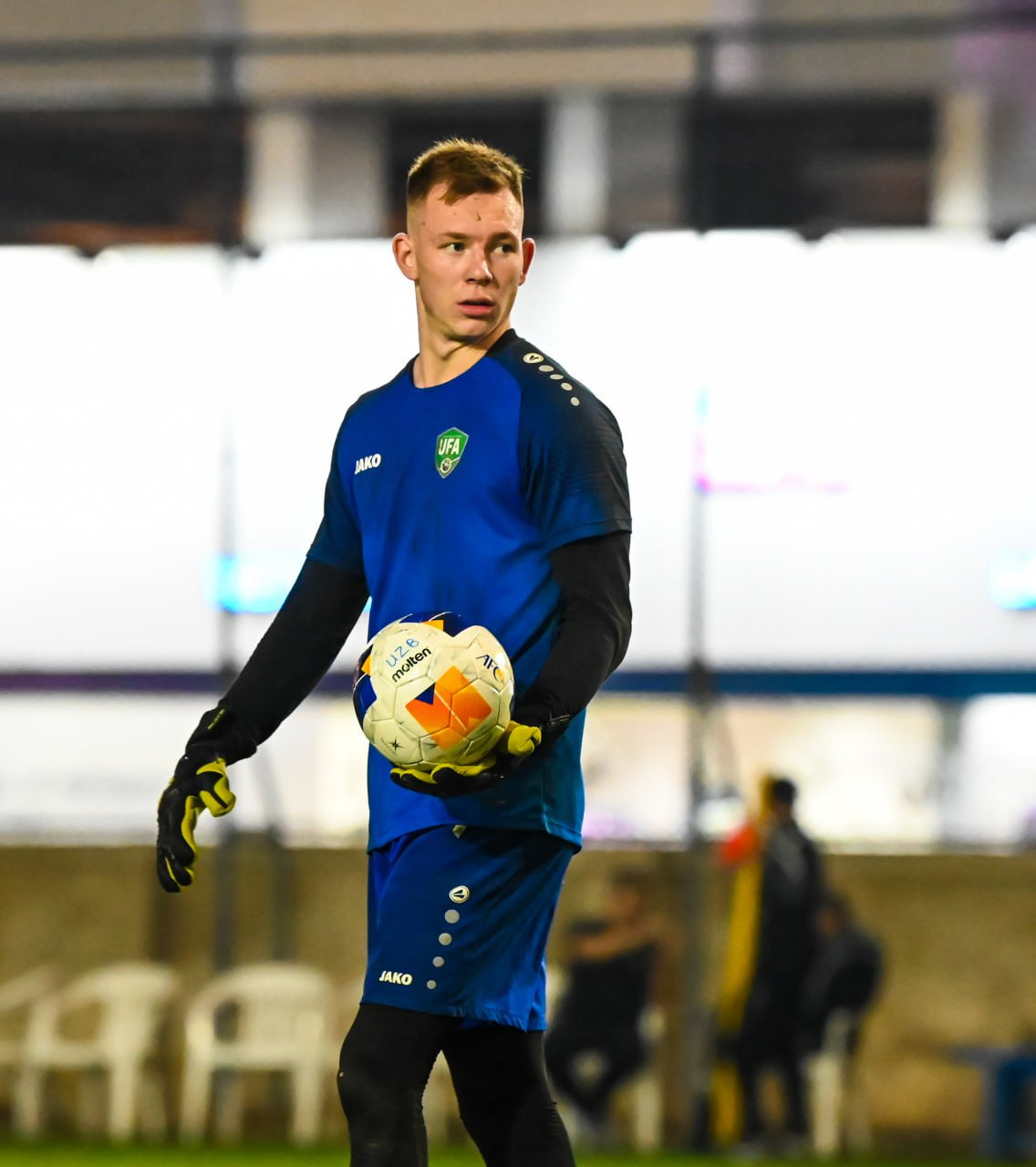
- Nazarov training with Uzbekistan in 2024

Personal information
- Full name: Vladimir Dmitriyevich Nazarov
- Date of birth: 8 June 2002 (age 24)
- Place of birth: Tashkent, Uzbekistan
- Height: 1.83 m (6 ft 0 in)
- Position: Goalkeeper

Team information
- Current team: Pakhtakor
- Number: 12

Youth career
- Pakhtakor-2

Senior career*
Years	Team	Apps	(Gls)
2021–2022	Olympic	14	(0)
2023	Neftchi	15	(0)
2024	Surkhon	0	(0)
2024	→ Pakhtakor (loan)	13	(0)
2025–	Pakhtakor	27	(0)

International career^{‡}
2021–2024	Uzbekistan U23	24	(0)
2025–	Uzbekistan	1	(0)
Medal record
Men's football
Representing Uzbekistan
CAFA Nations Cup
Winner	2025 Tajikistan–Uzbekistan	Team
Asian Games
Bronze medal – third place	2022 Hangzhou	Team
AFC U-23 Asian Cup
Silver medal – second place	2024 Qatar	Team
Silver medal – second place	2022 Uzbekistan	Team
- * Club domestic league appearances and goals as of 28 July 2026 ‡ National team caps and goals as of 8 September 2025 (UTC)

Vladimir Dmitriyevich Nazarov (born 8 June 2002) is an Uzbek professional footballer who plays for Pakhtakor and the Uzbekistan national team.

== Career ==
=== U23 team ===
Nazarov made his debut for the Uzbekistan U23 main team on 27 October 2021 in a Friendly match against Saudi Arabia U23.

=== Senior ===
Nazarov made his debut for the Uzbekistan main team on 8 September 2025 in a 2025 CAFA Nations Cup match against Iran.

Uzbekistan national team
Year	Apps	Goals
2025	1	0
Total	1	0

Statistics accurate as of match played 8 September 2025.

== Honours ==
Olimpic

- Uzbekistan Pro League: 2021

Uzbekistan-U23

- AFC U-23 Asian Cup: 2022 (runner-up)
