= 2026 Uzbekistan Super League =

Uzbekistan Super League
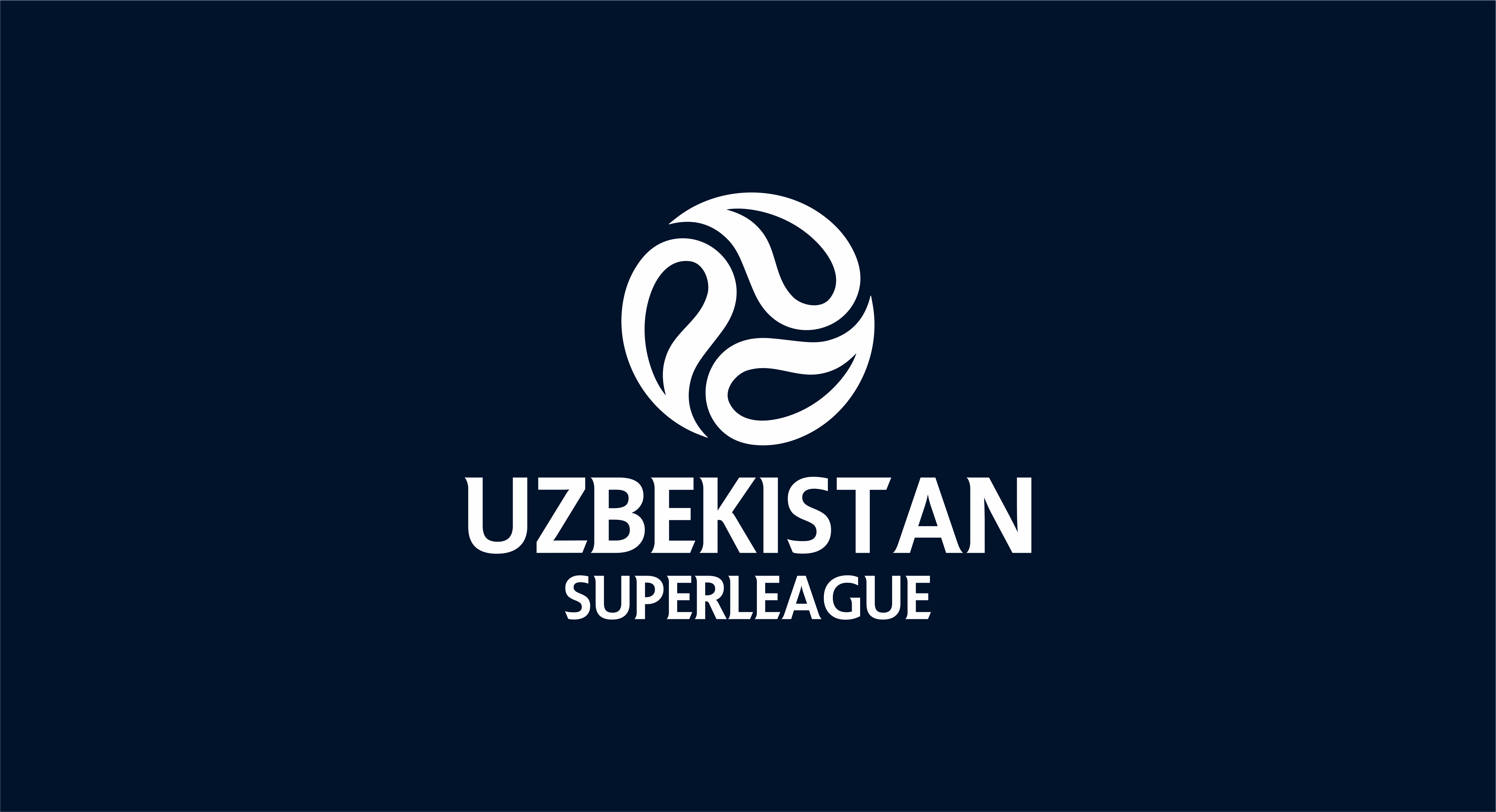
- Logo of Super League since 2024
- Season: 2026
- Dates: 27 February – till now
- Matches: 207
- Goals: 545 (2.63 per match)
- Biggest home win: Andijon 4–0 Sogdiana (27 February 2026)
- Biggest away win: Qizilqum 0–4 Neftchi Fergana (4 April 2026)
- Highest scoring: Qizilqum 2–4 Pakhtakor (20 March 2026); Pakhtakor 4–2 Dinamo (18 April 2026)
- Longest winning run: Neftchi Fergana (5); Pakhtakor (5)
- Longest unbeaten run: Kokand 1912 (6)
- Longest winless run: Mash'al (8)
- Longest losing run: Mash'al (8)
- Highest attendance: 18,756 – Neftchi vs Pakhtakor (9 April 2026)
- Lowest attendance: 112 – Sogdiana vs Kokand 1912 (2 April 2026)
- Average attendance: 4672 (19 April 2026)
- All statistics correct as of 19 April 2026.

The 2026 Uzbekistan Super League (Uzbek: Футбол бўйича 2026–йилги Ўзбекистон Суперлигаси) is the 35rd season of top-level football in Uzbekistan since its establishment in 1992.

== Season events ==
On August 21, 2025, the President of Uzbekistan adopted a resolution "On measures to digitalize and popularize the football industry in Uzbekistan". It outlined such objectives as increasing the number of people regularly involved in football, recruiting talented players and supporting Uzbek footballers playing professional football abroad. Beginning March 1, 2026, it was announced that purchasers would be identified when selling tickets to football matches.

The current season saw an expansion from 16 teams. At the end of the previous season, Shurtan were relegated to the Pro League. The newly promoted teams from the lower division were Lokomotiv.

On February 12, Uzbekneftegaz announced in a letter sent to Uzbekistan Football Association that it would stop funding the Nasaf, Bukhara and Bunyodkor clubs starting in 2026.

On February 25, Yandex Uzbekistan and the League signed a strategic partnership agreement aimed at expanding digital opportunities for fans. As part of the agreement, Yandex Uzbekistan became the official partner of Super League and the title sponsor of Pro League.

The first goal of the season was scored by Bukhara forwarder Sherzod Esanov against Kokand 1912.

In order to improve the financing of professional football clubs, it is planned that by 2026 each Super League club will receive an annual budget of 35 billion soums (2892000 USD) from the state.

AGMK played its home matches at the Olympic Stadium until the 8th round due to the unfinished reconstruction of its home stadium.

Matches, which were suspended in early May due to the World Cup, returned on July 20.

== Teams ==

=== Team changes ===
Promoted from 2025 Uzbekistan Pro League	Relegated from 2025 Uzbekistan Super League
PFC Lokomotiv Tashkent	FC Shurtan

PFC Lokomotiv Tashkent returned to the Uzbekistan Super League after a one year absence, while FC Shurtan was relegated to the Uzbekistan Professional Football League after spending time in the top flight for one year.

Team	Location	Stadium	Capacity	R.
FC Andijon	Andijan	Bobur Arena	18,360	
FC Bunyodkor	Tashkent	Milliy Stadium	34,800	
FC Bukhara	Bukhara	Buxoro Arena	22,700	
FC Dinamo Samarqand	Samarkand	Dinamo Samarkand Stadium	13,800	
FC Mash'al	Muborak	Bahrom Vafoev Stadium	11,000	
FC Nasaf	Qarshi	Markaziy Stadium	21,000	
PFC Navbahor Namangan	Namangan	Markaziy Stadium	28,000	
FC Neftchi Fergana	Fergana	Istiqlol Stadium	20,000	
FC OKMK	Olmaliq	AGMK Stadium	12,000	
Pakhtakor FC	Tashkent	Pakhtakor Central Stadium	34,000	
Qizilqum FC	Navoiy	Youth Sports Complex	22,500	
FC Kokand 1912	Kokand	Markaziy Stadium	12,278	
FC Sogdiana	Jizzakh	Sogdiana Stadium	11,650	
FC Surkhon	Termez	Surkhon Arena	10,600	
PFC Lokomotiv Tashkent	Tashkent	Lokomotiv Stadium	8,000	
FC Khorazm	Urgench	Xorazm Stadium	13,500	

=== Personnel and kits ===
Club	Head coach	Location	Kit manufacturer	Shirt sponsor
AGMK	(Uzbekistan) Mirjalol Qosimov	Olmaliq	(Uzbekistan) 7SABER	AKMK
Andijon	(Uzbekistan) Samvel Babayan	Andijan	(Germany) Adidas	Centrum Air, UzAuto ^{1}
Bukhara	(Russia) Aleksandr Khomyakov	Bukhara	(Germany) Adidas	BNQIZ
Bunyodkor	(Uzbekistan) Ilyos Zeytulayev	Tashkent	(Uzbekistan) 7SABER	Uzbekneftegaz
Dinamo	(Uzbekistan) Vadim Abramov	Samarkand	(Italy) Macron	Agromir Buildings
Kokand 1912	(Russia) Andrey Shipilov	Kokand	(Uzbekistan) 7SABER	None
Khorazm	(Uzbekistan) Sergey Tokov	Urgench	(Germany) Adidas	Uztelecom
Lokomotiv	(Australia) Mirko Jelicic	Tashkent	(Uzbekistan) 7SABER	Uzbekistan Railways
Mash'al	(Russia) Igor Surov	Mubarak	(Italy) Macron	NBU
Nasaf	(Uzbekistan) Ruziqul Berdiev	Qarshi	(Spain) Kelme	Uzbekistan GTL SGCC, ENTER Engineering^{1}
Navbahor	(Uzbekistan) Timur Kapadze	Namangan	(United States) Nike	Namangan City
Neftchi	(Uzbekistan) Islom Ismoilov	Fergana	(Germany) Adidas	FNQIZ
Pakhtakor	(Uzbekistan) Kamoliddin Tadjiev	Tashkent	(Germany) Adidas	Akfa, Uzcard^{1}
Qizilqum	(Uzbekistan) Akmal Rustamov	Navoiy	(Spain) Kelme	NMMC
Sogdiana	(Uzbekistan) Ulugbek Bakayev	Jizzakh	(Spain) Joma	BMB Energo
Surkhon	(Uzbekistan) Anvar Gafurov	Termez	(Germany) Adidas	Eriell Group

=== Managerial changes ===
Team	Outgoing manager	Manner of departure	Date of vacancy	Position in table	Replaced by	Date of appointment	Ref.
Surkhon	Stanislav Kudryashov	Mutual Termination	20 March 2026		Anvar Gafurov	20 March 2026	
Sogdiana	Ivan Bošković	Mutual Termination	31 March 2026	15th	Ulugbek Bakayev	31 March 2026	

== Foreign players ==
Notes

- Clubs could register a total of six foreign players over the course of the season.
- Players in italics were out of the squad or left the club within the season, after the pre-season transfer window or in the mid-season transfer window, and at least had one appearance.
- In bold: Players that have been capped for their national team. In Italic: Players that joined in mid-season

Club	Player 1	Player 2	Player 3	Player 4	Player 5	Player 6	Former players
AGMK	(Georgia (country)) **Giorgi Papava**	(Croatia) Ivan Pešić	(Iran) Siavash Haghnazari	(Japan) Naoaki Senaga	(Japan) Arihiro Sentoku	(Serbia) Uroš Ćosić	
Andijon	(Italy) Martin Boakye	(Georgia (country)) Imeda Ashortia	(Georgia (country)) Aleko Andronikashvili	(Russia) Artyom Potapov	(Serbia) **Nemanja Ćalasan**	(Serbia) Dragan Ćeran	(Poland) Krystian Nowak
Bukhara	(Bosnia and Herzegovina) Dominik Begić	(Georgia (country)) **Nika Kacharava**	(Montenegro) **Vladimir Rodić**	(Serbia) Veljko Filipović	(Serbia) Bojan Mlađović		(Georgia (country)) Mikheil Basheleishvili
Bunyodkor	(Italy) Federico Botti	(Montenegro) Matija Krivokapić	(Russia) Dmitry Pletnyov				(Japan) Itsuki Urata (Montenegro) Marko Bugarin
Dinamo	(Armenia) **Tigran Avanesyan**	(Bosnia and Herzegovina) Haris Hajdarević	(Guinea) Amadou Doumbouya	(Moldova) **Mihail Ștefan**	(Russia) Artem Radaev	(Serbia) Marko Stanojević	(Argentina) Salvador Sánchez (Burkina Faso) **Dramane Salou** (France) Mahamadou Dembélé (Ghana) **Kingsley Sarfo** (Slovenia) Til Mavretič (Uruguay) **Mauro Brasil**
Kokand 1912	(Georgia (country)) Andro Giorgadze	(Georgia (country)) Shota Gvazava	(Georgia (country)) Toma Tabatadze	(Liberia) **Sylvanus Nimely**	(Ukraine) Yehor Kondratyuk		(Turkey) Alper Özdemir
Khorazm	(Brazil) Elzio Lohan	(Brazil) Rafael Sabino	(Brazil) Rafael Tavares	(Russia) Maksim Shiryayev	(Serbia) Nikola Stošić	(Slovenia) Matija Rom	(France) Yanis Lhéry (Senegal) Boubacar Traorè
Lokomotiv	(Australia) **Aleksandar Šušnjar**	(Belarus) Mikalay Ivanow	(Russia) Aleksei Kozlov	(Serbia) **Jovan Nišić**	(Ukraine) Oleksandr Kucherenko		
Mash'al	(North Macedonia) **Vlatko Stojanovski**	(Montenegro) Drago Bumbar	(Nigeria) **Ifeanyi Ifeanyi**	(Russia) Vladislav Rusanov	(Russia) Pavel Bureev	(Serbia) Strahinja Bošnjak	(Russia) Roman Khadzhiev (Nigeria) Abdallah Maga (Ghana) Rashid Abubakar (Nigeria) **Raphael Ayagwa** (Nigeria) Augustine Chidi Kwem
Nasaf	(Georgia (country)) Paata Gudushauri	(Kosovo) Adenis Shala	(Nigeria) Yusuf Otubanjo	(Nigeria) **Kingsley Sokari**			
Navbahor	(Brazil) Alex Fernanes	(Georgia (country)) Anri Chichinadze	(Georgia (country)) Giorgi Jgerenaia	(Kyrgyzstan) **Joel Kojo**	(Nigeria) Benjamin Teidi	(Serbia) Vanja Ilić	(Democratic Republic of the Congo) Katulondi Kati
Neftchi	(Brazil) Jurani Ferreira	(Croatia) Stipe Perica	(Ivory Coast) Koffi Kouao	(Montenegro) **Vladimir Jovović**	(Serbia) Bojan Ciger	(Serbia) **Jovan Đokić** (Serbia) Zoran Marušić	
Pakhtakor	(Brazil) Flamarion	(Iran) **Morteza Pouraliganji**	(Iraq) **Bashar Resan**	(Iraq) **Zaid Tahseen**	(Iraq) **Aymen Hussein**	(Nigeria) Stephen Chinedu	(Poland) Piotr Parzyszek
Qizilqum	(Brazil) Maykon Douglas	(Georgia (country)) **Grigol Chabradze**	(Georgia (country)) **Jaba Jighauri**	(Montenegro) Nikola Kumburović	(Serbia) Luka Ratkovic		(Tajikistan) **Alisher Shukurov** (Ukraine) Oleksiy Shchebetun
Sogdiana	(Bosnia and Herzegovina) Dženan Zajmović	(North Macedonia) **Ljupcho Doriev**	(Serbia) Filip Ivanović	(Serbia) Petar Mićin	(Serbia) Milan Mitrović	(Tajikistan) **Zoir Dzhuraboyev**	(Serbia) Nikola Mirković (Serbia) Fejsal Mulić (Montenegro) **Aleksandar Boljević**
Surkhon	(Georgia (country)) Tornike Dzebniauri	(Nigeria) Richard Friday	(Russia) Dzhamaldin Khodzhaniyazov	(United States) Santiago Garcia			(Nigeria) Stephen Chinedu (Russia) Artyom Potapov

== League table ==
Pos	Team	Pld	W	D	L	GF	GA	GD	Pts	Qualification or relegation
1	Neftchi (A)	28	20	4	4	67	26	+41	64	Qualification for AFC Champions League Elite league stage
2	Pakhtakor (A)	28	17	8	3	49	28	+21	59	Qualification for the AFC Champions League Two group stage
3	Navbahor (A)	28	17	7	4	49	27	+22	58	Qualification for the Silk Way Cup group stage
4	Nasaf	28	13	9	6	41	23	+18	48	
5	Lokomotiv	28	13	7	8	45	35	+10	46	
6	OKMK	28	13	6	9	38	36	+2	45	
7	Bukhara	28	12	7	9	39	32	+7	43	
8	Qizilqum	28	11	5	12	26	32	−6	38	
9	Dinamo	27	10	7	10	42	40	+2	37	
10	Sogdiana	28	9	6	13	45	53	−8	33	
11	Surkhon	28	7	11	10	20	29	−9	32	
12	Andijon	28	9	5	14	30	38	−8	32	Relegation play-off Uzbekistan Pro League
13	Khorazm	28	6	9	13	23	38	−15	27	Relegation play-off Uzbekistan Pro League
14	Bunyodkor	27	8	2	17	27	47	−20	26	Relegation play-off Uzbekistan Pro League
15	Kokand 1912	28	5	9	14	26	40	−14	24	Relegation play-off Uzbekistan Pro League
16	Mash'al (R)	28	1	2	25	12	55	−43	5	Relegation to Uzbekistan Pro League

Updated to match(es) played on 21 November 2026. Source: Uzbekistan Professional Football League
Rules for classification: 1) Points; 2) Head-to-head points; 3) Head-to-head goal difference; 4) Head-to-head away goals scored; 5) Goal difference; 6) Number of goals scored.
(A) Advance to a further round; (R) Relegated

== Results ==
Home \ Away	AND	BUK	BUN	DIN	KHO	KOK	LOK	MAS	NAS	NAV	NEF	AGM	PAK	QIZ	SOG	SUR
Andijon	—	2–0		2–1	1–0	2–1	1–3	2–0	1–4	0–1	0–3	1–2	0–0	0–1	4–0	1–2
Bukhara	4–1	—	1–0	3–1	1–1	1–0	2–0		0–1	1–4	4–1	2–0	0–1	2–0	2–1	0–0
Bunyodkor	1–3	2–1	—	1–2	1–2	0–1	2–0	2–1	1–3	2–1	0–1	2–3	0–1		1–1	0–1
Dinamo	1–1	1–2		—	2–2	3–2	1–2	3–1	1–1	1–2	0–0	2–2	1–1	1–0	2–1	
Khorazm	0–3	0–0	1–2	2–1	—	2–2	1–3	2–0		1–2	0–2	1–0	0–1	1–3	0–0	1–0
Kokand 1912	0–0	1–1	1–0	1–1		—	2–1	3–0	1–1	2–1	2–4	1–4	1–2	0–0	0–1	0–1
Lokomotiv	3–3		4–1	2–1	1–1	0–0	—	3–0	0–0	0–2	0–1	1–2	2–1	1–0	3–1	3–1
Mash'al	0–1	0–1	0–1	0–3	0–1	1–0	0–2	—	1–1	0–2		0–1	1–2	0–2	1–3	0–0
Nasaf	1–0	1–1	3–0	2–1	1–0	0–0	2–3	2–0	—	0–0	6–2		1–2	1–0	2–1	0–1
Navbahor	1–0	0–1	4–3	3–2	5–1		1–1	2–1	1–0	—	3–2	2–3	1–1	1–1	1–1	2–0
Neftchi	3–0	2–1	4–0		2–2	4–0	3–1	3–0	2–1	1–1	—	2–1	0–1	5–0	3–0	2–1
OKMK		3–2	0–1	0–1	1–0	2–1	2–1	2–1	0–2	2–2	0–0	—	1–3	0–1	2–2	1–1
Pakhtakor	3–0	2–2	3–1	4–2	2–1	3–1	1–1	2–1	2–2	0–2	1–3	3–1	—	2–0		0–0
Qizilqum	2–1	3–2	3–0	1–2	0–0	2–1	1–1	2–0	1–0	0–1	0–4	0–1		—	1–3	0–0
Sogdiana	1–0	1–1	2–3	1–3	2–0	2–2	2–3	5–2	0–2		1–5	1–2	2–4	2–1	—	5–2
Surkhon	0–0	3–1	0–0	1–2	0–0	1–0		2–1	1–1	0–1	0–3	0–0	1–1	0–1	1–3	—

Updated to match(es) played on 21 November 2026. Source: Uzbekistan Professional Football League
Legend: Blue = home team win; Yellow = draw; Red = away team win.

== Results by match played ==
Team ╲ Round	1	2	3	4	5	6	7	8	9	10	11
AGMK	L	L	D	W	L	D	W	W	D	W	D
Andijon	W	L	L	W	L	L	L	D	W	W	W
Bukhara	W	W	D	W	L	W	D	L	L	W	W
Bunyodkor	W	L	D	W	W	W	L	W	L	W	L
Dinamo	L	W	D	L	L	W	L	L	D	L	W
Khorazm	L	W	D	L	W	D	D	W	L	D	L
Kokand 1912	L	L	D	W	D	D	D	D	L	L	W
Lokomotiv Tashkent	W	W	D	L	L	D	W	L	W	L	W
Mash'al	L	L	L	L	L	L	L	L	L	L	L
Nasaf	W	W	D	L	W	D	D	L	L	D	D
Navbahor	W	L	W	L	W	W	W	W	D	L	D
Neftchi	W	W	W	W	W	L	W	W	W	W	D
Pakhtakor	W	W	L	W	W	W	W	W	W	D	D
Qizilqum	L	W	W	L	L	L	L	W	W	D	L
Sogdiana	L	L	D	L	D	L	W	L	D	W	L
Surkhon	L	L	D	W	W	D	L	L	W	L	D

Updated to match(es) played on 18 June 2026. Source: pfl.uz
W = Win; D = Draw; L = Loss; P = Postponed

== Season statistics ==
- First goal of the season: Sherzod Esanov for Bukhara against Kokand 1912 (27 February 2026)

=== Goalscorers ===
As of match played 10 September 2026

Rank	Player	Team	Goals
1	(North Macedonia) Ljupcho Doriev	Sogdiana	14
2	(Uzbekistan) Dostonbek Khamdamov	Pakhtakor	6
2	(Uzbekistan) Temurkhuja Abdukholiqov	Lokomotiv Tashkent	6
2	(Nigeria) Stephen Chinedu	Surkhon	6
5	(Uzbekistan) Sherzod Esanov	Bukhara	5
5	(Croatia) Stipe Perica	Neftchi	5
7	(Brazil) Flamarion	Pakhtakor	4
7	(Uzbekistan) Anvar Khojimirzaev	Dinamo Samarqand	4
7	(Montenegro) Matija Krivokapić	Bunyodkor	4
7	(Uzbekistan) Nodir Abdurazzakov	AGMK	4

=== Top assists ===
As of match played 10 September 2026

Rank	Player	Team	Assists
1	(Uzbekistan) Jamshid Iskanderov	Neftchi	9
1	(Uzbekistan) Dostonbek Khamdamov	Pakhtakor	9
1	(Brazil) Alex Fernandes	Navbahor	9
4	(Brazil) Flamarion	Pakhtakor	2
4	(Uzbekistan) Shakhzod Ubaydullaev	Bukhara	2
4	(Serbia) Veljko Filipović	Bukhara	2
4	(Uzbekistan) Javokhir Kakhramonov	Sogdiana	2
4	(Uzbekistan) Asad Sobirzhonov	AGMK	2

=== Clean sheets ===
As of match played 19 April 2026

#	Player	Team	Clean sheets
1	(Uzbekistan) Botirali Ergashev	Neftchi	6
2	(Uzbekistan) Utkir Yusupov	Navbahor	4
3	(Uzbekistan) Umid Khamroev	Bukhara	3
3	(Uzbekistan) Abduvohid Nematov	Nasaf	3
5	(Uzbekistan) Rakhimzhon Davronov	Andijon	2
5	(Uzbekistan) Abdumavlon Abdujalilov	Bunyodkor	2
5	(Russia) Aleksei Kozlov	Lokomotiv	2
5	(Uzbekistan) Sulton Rahmatov	Qizilqum	2
5	(Uzbekistan) Davron Merganov	Surkhon	2
5	(Uzbekistan) Rustam Nartadzhiev	Kokand 1912	2
5	(Italy) Federico Botti	Bunyodkor	2
12	(Uzbekistan) Vladimir Nazarov	Pakhtakor	1
12	(Serbia) Nikola Stosic	Khorazm	1
12	(Uzbekistan) Khamidullo Abdunabiev	AGMK	1
12	(Uzbekistan) Sanjar Kuvvatov	Pakhtakor	1
12	(Uzbekistan) Mashkhur Mukhammadjonov	Khorazm	1
12	(Uzbekistan) Eldor Adkhamov	Andijon	1

== Attendance ==
As of match played 19 April 2026

=== By rounds ===
Uzbekistan Super League attendance by rounds
Rounds	Total	GP.	Average
Round 1	42,188	8	5,274
Round 2	22,044	8	2,756
Round 3	33,738	8	4,217
Round 4	50,960	8	6,370
Round 5	19,298	8	2,412
Round 6	55,778	8	6,972
Round 7	35,648	8	4,456
Round 8	37,617	8	4,702
Total	297,271	56	5,308

=== By clubs ===
The table below shows fan attendance at the clubs' home games.

Club \ Matches in home	1	2	3	4	5	6	7	8	9	10	11	12	13	14	15	Total	Average
AGMK	1,230	1,024	1,002	2,035												5,291	1,323
Andijon	14,180	4,104	18,726	6,400												43,410	10,853
Bukhara	4,235	3,985	5,649	7,132												21,001	5,250
Bunyodkor	1,819	1,327	2,171													5,317	1,772
Dinamo Samarqand	9,720	7,105	4,014	6,109												26,948	6,737
Kokand 1912	2,100	7,363	4,651	7,650												21,764	5,441
Khorazm	6,220	9,678	7,650	5,680												29,228	7,307
Lokomotiv Tashkent	323	325	1,008	1,071												2,727	682
Mashʼal	476	1,154	489	1,046												2,676	892
Nasaf	1,790	275	1,130	7,824												11,019	2,755
Navbahor	653	1,137	1,138													2,928	976
Neftchi	7,255	14,801	16,825	18,756	17,258											74,895	14,979
Pakhtakor	3,455	2,100	1,871	1,073	2,226											10,725	2,145
Qizilqum	7,350	5,651	2,850	5,253												21,104	5,276
Sogdiana	712	1,415	112	2,347												4,586	1,147
Surkhon	2,714	3,244	3,221	3,984												13,163	3,291

== See also ==
- 2026 Uzbekistan Pro League
- 2026 Uzbekistan Cup
- 2026 Uzbekistan Super Cup
