= 2026 Pakhtakor FC season =

Pakhtakor Tashkent
2026 season
- President: Bobur Shodiev
- Manager: Kamoliddin Tajiev
- Uzbek League: 2nd
- Uzbekistan Cup: Last 16 vs Neftchi Fergana
- Super Cup: Runners Up
- AFC Champions League Elite: Group stage
- Top goalscorer: League: Dostonbek Khamdamov (7); All: Dostonbek Khamdamov (9)
- Highest home attendance: 5,750 vs Nasaf (28 April 2026)
- Lowest home attendance: 1,073 vs Mash'al (13 April 2026)
- Average home league attendance: 2,332 (21 August 2026)
Home colours	Away colours

The 2026 season is Pakhtakor Tashkent's 35th season in the Uzbek League in Uzbekistan.

== Season events ==
On 5 January, Pakhtakor announced the signing of Sanjar Kuvvatov from Qizilqum to a one-year contract, the signings of Oybek Bozorov and Sherzod Nasrullaev from Nasaf, both to a two-year contracts.

On 7 January, Pakhtakor announced that Igor Sergeev had not renewed his contract with the club, and left in order to continue his career in Iran with Persepolis.

On 9 January, Pakhtakor announced that Nikita Shevchenko, Jhonatan, Umar Adkhamzoda, Diyor Kholmatov, Brayan Riascos and Bobur Abdikholikov had all left Pakhtakor after their contracts had expired.

On 13 January, Pakhtakor announced that they had extended their contracts with Bashar Resan and Dostonbek Khamdamov until the end of 2026, with Rustam Turdimurodov and Saidumar Saidnurullaev until the end of 2027 and with Vladimir Nazarov until the end of the 2028 season.

On 3 February, Pakhtakor announced the signing of Akmal Mozgovoy from Baniyas, to a two-year contract.

On 11 February, Pakhtakor announced that they had extended their contract with Khojiakbar Alijonov until the end of the 2027 season.

On 17 February, Pakhtakor announced the signing of Piotr Parzyszek, who'd most recently played for KuPS.

On 1 July, Pakhtakor announced that Piotr Parzyszek had left the club after his contract was mutually terminated.

On 11 July, Pakhtakor announced the signing of Stephen Chinedu on loan for the remainder of the season from fellow Super League club Surkhon.

On 3 August, Pakhtakor announced the signing of Aymen Hussein from Al-Karma on a contract until the end of the season.

On 10 August, Pakhtakor announced the signing of Morteza Pouraliganji from Persepolis on a contract until the end of the season.

In August, Pakhtakor announced that Emil Caras would be their head coach during their AFC Champions League Elite qualifier against Al-Hussein on 11 August, as Kamoliddin Tajiev doesn't hold the necessary licenses.

== Squad ==
As of match played 8 November 2026

No.	Name	Nationality	Position	Date of birth (age)	Signed from	Signed in	Contract ends	Apps.	Goals
Goalkeepers
12	Vladimir Nazarov	(Uzbekistan)	GK	8 June 2002 (age 24)	Surkhon	2025	2028	63	0
35	Sanjar Kuvvatov	(Uzbekistan)	GK	8 January 1990 (age 36)	Qizilqum	2026	2026	133	0
Defenders
3	Shakhzod Azmiddinov	(Uzbekistan)	DF	7 August 2000 (age 26)	Academy	2020		104	5
4	Zaid Tahseen	(Iraq)	DF	29 January 2001 (age 25)	Al-Quwa Al-Jawiya	2025	2026	39	5
5	Morteza Pouraliganji	(Iran)	DF	19 April 1992 (age 34)	Persepolis	2026	2026	7	0
7	Khojiakbar Alijonov	(Uzbekistan)	DF	19 April 1997 (age 29)	Academy	2017	2027	261	12
8	Dilshod Saitov	(Uzbekistan)	DF	2 February 1999 (age 27)	Nasaf	2023		89	3
20	Dilshod Abdullaev	(Uzbekistan)	DF	9 May 2005 (age 21)	Academy	2023		13	1
34	Sherzod Nasrullaev	(Uzbekistan)	DF	23 July 1998 (age 28)	Nasaf	2026	2027	30	1
55	Mukhammadrasul Abdumazhidov	(Uzbekistan)	DF	23 July 2004 (age 22)	Academy	2023		94	3
Midfielders
9	Ibrokhim Ibrokhimov	(Uzbekistan)	MF	12 January 2001 (age 25)	Olympic Tashkent	2024		67	9
10	Akmal Mozgovoy	(Uzbekistan)	MF	2 April 1999 (age 27)	Baniyas	2026	2027	30	0
11	Khojimat Erkinov	(Uzbekistan)	MF	29 May 2001 (age 25)	Al Wahda	2025	2026	39	5
17	Dostonbek Khamdamov	(Uzbekistan)	MF	24 July 1996 (age 30)	Al-Nasr	2021	2026	242	55
21	Bashar Resan	(Iraq)	MF	22 December 1996 (age 29)	Qatar SC	2025	2026	71	10
23	Abdurauf Buriev	(Uzbekistan)	MF	20 July 2002 (age 24)	Olympic Tashkent	2023		80	0
27	Sardor Sabirkhodjaev	(Uzbekistan)	MF	6 November 1994 (age 32)	Bunyodkor	2019	2026	264	15
77	Oybek Bozorov	(Uzbekistan)	MF	7 August 1997 (age 29)	Nasaf	2026	2027	24	1
Forwards
29	Aymen Hussein	(Iraq)	FW	22 March 1996 (age 30)	Al-Karma	2026	2026	15	1
50	Flamarion	(Brazil)	FW	30 July 1996 (age 30)	Valenciennes	2025		62	15
90	Stephen Chinedu	(Nigeria)	FW	6 January 2000 (age 26)	on loan from Surkhon	2026	2026	21	4
U21
6	Sardor Mirkobilov	(Uzbekistan)	MF	24 December 2006 (age 19)	Academy	2026		3	0
13	Muhammadali Dilshodbekov	(Uzbekistan)	DF	10 October 2007 (age 19)	Academy	2026		3	0
15	Amirkhon Muradov	(Uzbekistan)	DF	15 June 2008 (age 18)	Academy	2026		0	0
16	Miraziz Abdukarimov	(Uzbekistan)	DF	11 May 2008 (age 18)	Sogdiana	2026		1	0
18	Abubakir Shukurullaev	(Uzbekistan)	MF	2 February 2008 (age 18)	Academy	2026		1	0
22	Mukhammad-Bobur Karimov	(Uzbekistan)	DF	13 March 2006 (age 20)	Academy	2025		5	1
24	Diyor Qo'shmatov	(Uzbekistan)	DF		Academy	2026		0	0
25	Rasul Mamatov	(Uzbekistan)	GK	16 December 2007 (age 18)	Academy	2026		0	0
26	Davron Tulaganov	(Uzbekistan)	FW	4 February 2007 (age 19)	Academy	2026		6	0
28	Jamshidbek Rustamov	(Uzbekistan)	MF	2 February 2008 (age 18)	Academy	2026		0	0
33	Kuvanishbek Saydaliev	(Uzbekistan)	MF	11 March 2007 (age 19)	Academy	2026		2	0
36	Khumoyun Nazarov	(Uzbekistan)	MF	2 February 2007 (age 19)	Academy	2026		0	0
37	Faridjon Farhodov	(Uzbekistan)	MF		Academy	2026		0	0
39	Mironshoh Mehmonov	(Uzbekistan)	MF		Academy	2026		0	0
44	Diyor Ermanov	(Uzbekistan)	DF	2 January 2007 (age 19)	Academy	2026		2	0
45	Farrukh Agaev	(Uzbekistan)	MF	21 May 2007 (age 19)	Academy	2026		0	0
63	Yakhyo Urinboev	(Uzbekistan)	MF	15 December 2006 (age 19)	Academy	2026		0	0
66	Abdumalik Anvarov	(Uzbekistan)	DF	14 June 2008 (age 18)	Academy	2026		0	0
88	Olim Shomurodov	(Uzbekistan)	GK	11 March 2009 (age 17)	Academy	2026		0	0
99	Maksim Murkaev	(Uzbekistan)	GK	21 February 2005 (age 21)	Surkhon	2026		0	0
Players away on loan
2	Behruzbek Askarov	(Uzbekistan)	MF	8 March 2003 (age 23)	Academy	2023		41	1
14	Rustam Turdimurodov	(Uzbekistan)	FW	4 April 2004 (age 22)	Academy	2022	2027	20	5
18	Saidumar Saidnurullaev	(Uzbekistan)	MF	13 April 2005 (age 21)	Academy	2023	2027	14	2
52	Nurlan Ibraimov	(Uzbekistan)	MF	29 August 2005 (age 21)	Academy	2023		2	0
Players who left during the season
5	Mukhammadkodir Khamraliev	(Uzbekistan)	DF	6 July 2001 (age 25)	Dinamo Samarqand	2023	2026	80	3
19	Piotr Parzyszek	(Poland)	FW	8 September 1993 (age 33)	Unattached	2026		13	2

== Transfers ==
=== In ===
Date	Position	Nationality	Name	From	Fee	Ref.
5 January 2026	GK	(Uzbekistan)	Sanjar Kuvvatov	Qizilqum	Undisclosed	
5 January 2026	DF	(Uzbekistan)	Sherzod Nasrullaev	Nasaf	Undisclosed	
5 January 2026	MF	(Uzbekistan)	Oybek Bozorov	Nasaf	Undisclosed	
3 February 2026	MF	(Uzbekistan)	Akmal Mozgovoy	Baniyas	Undisclosed	
17 February 2026	FW	(Poland)	Piotr Parzyszek	Unattached	Free	
3 August 2026	FW	(Iraq)	Aymen Hussein	Al-Karma	Undisclosed	
10 August 2026	DF	(Iran)	Morteza Pouraliganji	Persepolis	Undisclosed	

=== Loans in ===
Start date	Position	Nationality	Name	From	End date	Ref.
11 July 2026	FW	(Nigeria)	Stephen Chinedu	Surkhon	31 December 2026	

=== Out ===
Date	Position	Nationality	Name	To	Fee	Ref.
11 August 2026	DF	(Uzbekistan)	Mukhammadkodir Khamraliev	Navbahor Namangan	Undisclosed	

=== Released ===
Date	Position	Nationality	Name	Joined	Date	Ref
18 February 2026	MF	(Uzbekistan)	Azizbek Turgunboev	Andijon	18 February 2026	
1 July 2026	FW	(Poland)	Piotr Parzyszek	KuPS	2 July 2026	

== Friendlies ==
22 January 2026	Pakhtakor	1–1	Struga	Antalya, Turkey
14:00 UZT (UTC+5)	(o.g.)	Report	Goal

26 January 2026	Pakhtakor	1–2	Prishtina e Re	Antalya, Turkey
13:30 UZT (UTC+5)	Tulaganov	Report	Goal

30 January 2026	Pakhtakor	1–0	Pelister	Antalya, Turkey
13:30 UZT (UTC+5)	Resan	Report

7 February 2026	Pakhtakor	1–1	Kairat	Antalya, Turkey
19:00 UZT (UTC+5)	Resan 50'	Report	Shirobokov 24'

8 February 2026	Pakhtakor	3–2	Petrocub Hîncești	Antalya, Turkey
18:30 UZT (UTC+5)	Erkinov 7'; Ibrokhimov 27'; Turdimurodov 75'	Report	Goal

12 February 2026	Pakhtakor	0–2	Epitsentr Kamianets-Podilskyi	Antalya, Turkey
16:00 UZT (UTC+5)	Erkinov (red card) 56'	Report	40'; 79'

12 February 2026	Pakhtakor	1–1	Obolon Kyiv	Antalya, Turkey
19:00 UZT (UTC+5)	Turdimuradov 13'	Report	90'

15 February 2026	Pakhtakor	0–2	Rubin Kazan	Antalya, Turkey
18:30 UZT (UTC+5)		Report	9'; 85'

17 February 2026	Pakhtakor	3–4	Spaeri	Antalya, Turkey
UZT (UTC+5)	Khamdamov 6'; Erkinov 63'; Turdimurodov 67' (pen.)	Report	16' (pen.); 17'; 47'; 70'

== Competitions ==
=== Overview ===
Competition	First match	Last match	Starting round	Final position	Record							
Competition	First match	Last match	Starting round	Final position	Pld	W	D	L	GF	GA	GD	Win %
Super League	27 February 2026		Matchday 1		27	17	8	2	48	26	+22	62.96
Uzbekistan Cup	13 May 2026	29 September 2026	Group stage	Last 16	4	2	0	2	7	4	+3	50.00
Super Cup	15 March 2026	15 March 2026	Final	Runnersup	1	0	0	1	0	1	−1	0.00
AFC Champions League Elite	11 August 2026		Preliminary round		5	1	2	2	7	9	−2	20.00
Total					37	20	10	7	62	40	+22	54.05

Last updated: 8 November 2026
Source: Competitions

=== Super Cup ===
15 March 2026	Neftchi Fergana	1–0	Pakhtakor	Andijan
19:30 UZT (UTC+5)	Ratinho 17' (yellow card) 67'; Gafurov (yellow card) 82'	Report		Stadium: Bobur Arena; Attendance: 16,821; Referee: Timur Tukhtasinov

=== Super League ===
==== League table ====
Pos	Team	Pld	W	D	L	GF	GA	GD	Pts	Qualification or relegation
1	Neftchi (A)	25	18	4	3	59	22	+37	58	Qualification for AFC Champions League Elite league stage
2	Pakhtakor	26	16	8	2	45	25	+20	56	Qualification for the AFC Champions League Two group stage
3	Navbahor	26	15	7	4	45	25	+20	52	Qualification for the Silk Way Cup group stage
4	OKMK	26	13	6	7	37	33	+4	45	
5	Nasaf	26	11	9	6	38	23	+15	42	

Updated to match(es) played on 1 November 2026. Source: Uzbekistan Professional Football League
Rules for classification: 1) Points; 2) Head-to-head points; 3) Head-to-head goal difference; 4) Head-to-head away goals scored; 5) Goal difference; 6) Number of goals scored.
(A) Advance to a further round

==== Results summary ====
Overall								Home						Away					
Pld	W	D	L	GF	GA	GD	Pts	W	D	L	GF	GA	GD	W	D	L	GF	GA	GD
27	17	8	2	48	26	+22	59	8	4	2	28	17	+11	9	4	0	20	9	+11

Last updated: 8 November 2026.
Source: See Results

==== Results by round ====
Round	1	2	3	4	5	6	7	8	9	10	11	12	13	14	15	16	17	18	19	20	21	22	23	24	25	26	27
Ground	H	A	H	A	H	A	H	H	A	H	A	H	H	H	A	H	A	H	A	H	A	A	H	A	H	A	H
Result	W	W	L	W	W	W	W	W	W	D	D	D	W	W	D	D	W	D	D	W	W	W	W	D	L	W	W
Position	4	3	6	3	2	1	1	1	1	2	2	2	2	2	2	2	2	2	2	2	2	2	1	2	2	2	2

Source: See Results
A = Away; H = Home; W = Win; D = Draw; L = Loss

==== Results ====
27 February 2026 1	Pakhtakor	2–0	Qizilqum	Tashkent
19:00 UZT (UTC+5)	Khamdamov 75'; Parzyszek 90+4'	Report	Gafurov (yellow card) 70'	Stadium: Central Stadium; Attendance: 3,455; Referee: Doston Rakhmonov

4 March 2026 2	Kokand 1912	1–2	Pakhtakor	Kokand
13:45 UZT (UTC+5)	Salimov (yellow card) 10'; Tabatadze 90+5' (pen.)	Report	Khamdamov 49'; Parzyszek 56'; Tahseen (yellow card) 90+5'	Stadium: Markaziy Stadium; Attendance: 2,100; Referee: G'ayrat Jo'rayev

10 March 2026 3	Pakhtakor	0–2	Navbahor Namangan	Tashkent
15:00 UZT (UTC+5)	Ibrokhimov (yellow card) 61'; Tahseen (yellow card) 80'	Report	Kholmatov (yellow card) 35'; Kati 47'; Jiyanov 65'	Stadium: Central Stadium; Attendance: 2,100; Referee: Firdavs Norsafarov

20 March 2026 4	Sogdiana	2–4	Pakhtakor	Jizzakh
18:15 UZT (UTC+5)	Ivanović 3' (yellow card) 53'; Soyibov (yellow card) 65'; Mulić 90+5' (pen.)	Report	Flamarion 37'; Turdimurodov 50', 57' (pen.); Nasrullaev (yellow card) 61'; Erkinov 75' (pen.)	Stadium: Sogdiana Stadium; Attendance: 1,415; Referee: Ravshan Abdivoxidov

4 April 2025 5	Pakhtakor	3–1	AGMK	Tashkent
18:00 UZT (UTC+5)	Flamarion 21'; Khamdamov 45+1'; Khamraliev 62'	Report	Kholmurodov 46'	Stadium: Central Stadium; Attendance: 1,871; Referee: Shavkat Nasibullayev

9 April 2026 6	Neftchi Fergana	0–1	Pakhtakor	Fergana
19:00 UZT (UTC+5)	Ratinho (yellow card) 7'; Jovović (yellow card) 84'	Report	Alijonov (yellow card) 3'; Khamdamov 22'; Turdimurodov (yellow card) 60'; Kuvvatov (yellow card) 78'; Resan (yellow card) 90+5'	Stadium: Istiqlol Stadium; Attendance: 18,756; Referee: Ilgiz Tantashev

13 April 2026 7	Pakhtakor	2–1	Mash'al	Tashkent
19:00 UZT (UTC+5)	Flamarion 41'; Juraev 45+2' (o.g.); Turdimurodov (yellow card) 63'	Report	Muzaffarov (yellow card) 61'; Juraev 68'	Stadium: Central Stadium; Attendance: 1,073; Referee: Olim Tuychibayev

18 April 2026 8	Pakhtakor	4–2	Dinamo Samarqand	Tashkent
16:15 UZT (UTC+5)	Khamdamov 9', 61'; Mozgovoy (yellow card) 15'; Resan 22', 71'	Report	Urozov (yellow card) 20'; Khojimirzaev 25'; Amonov 27'; Dembélé (yellow card) 31'; Yoʻldoshev (yellow card) 45+6'	Stadium: Central Stadium; Attendance: 2,226; Referee: Gʻayrat Djurayev

22 April 2026 9	Bukhara	0–1	Pakhtakor	Bukhara
UZT (UTC+5)	Mukhtorov (yellow card) 50'; Juraev (yellow card) 75'; Begić (yellow card) 86'; Jurabekov (yellow card) 90+5'	Report	Resan 16'; Kuvvatov (yellow card) 20'; Mozgovoy (yellow card) 52'	Stadium: Buxoro Arena; Attendance: 8,250; Referee: Doston Rakhmonov

28 April 2026 10	Pakhtakor	2–2	Nasaf	Tashkent
20:00 UZT (UTC+5)	Alijonov 42'; Flamarion 90+2' (pen.)	Report	Gaybullaev (yellow card) 32'; Khushvaktov (yellow card) 45+2' (yellow-red card) 90'; Bakhromov 56'; Abdikholikov 90+3' (yellow card) 90+3'	Stadium: Central Stadium; Attendance: 5,750; Referee: Akobirxoʻja Shukurullayev

3 May 2026 11	Surkhon	1–1	Pakhtakor	Termez
15:15 UZT (UTC+5)	Abdullazhonov 41'; Ashuboyev (yellow card) 82'; Shaydulov (yellow card) 84'	Report	Buriev (yellow card) 25'; Khamraliev (yellow card) 74'; Azmiddinov 90+1'	Stadium: Surkhon Arena; Attendance: 3,414; Referee: Shavkat Nasibullayev

17 July 2026 12	Pakhtakor	1–1	Lokomotiv Tashkent	Tashkent
20:00 UZT (UTC+5)	Turdimurodov 11'; Tahseen (yellow card) 90+2'; Chinedu (yellow card) 90+2'	Report	Abrayev (yellow card) 8'; Zoteyev (yellow card) 57'; Shodiboyev 63'; Šušnjar (yellow card) 90+2'	Stadium: Central Stadium; Attendance: 2,032; Referee: Ilgiz Tantashev

21 July 2026 13	Pakhtakor	2–1	Khorazm	Tashkent
16:00 UZT (UTC+5)	Sabirkhodjaev 18'; Chinedu 68'; Buriev (yellow card) 87'	Report	Lohan 8'; Ortikboev (yellow card) 33'; Sabino (yellow card) 66'; Izzatov (yellow card) 90+3'	Stadium: Central Stadium; Attendance: 1,115; Referee: Doston Rakhmonov

26 July 2026 14	Bunyodkor	0–1	Pakhtakor	Tashkent
16:00 UZT (UTC+5)	Normurodov (yellow card) 87'	Report	Khamdamov 49'; Nasrullaev (yellow card) 89'	Stadium: Milliy Stadium; Attendance: 2,378; Referee: Asker Nazhafaliev

1 August 2026 15	Andijon	0–0	Pakhtakor	Andijan
15:30 UZT (UTC+5)	Abdumajidov (yellow card) 42'; Turgunboev (yellow card) 44'; Ćalasan (yellow card) 80'; Sulaymonov (yellow card) 86'; Boakye (yellow card) 90+3'	Report	Abdumazhidov (yellow card) 90+3'	Stadium: Bobur Arena; Attendance: 17,134; Referee: Ravshan Abdivoxidov

6 August 2026 16	Pakhtakor	2–2	Bukhara	Tashkent
16:00 UZT (UTC+5)	Saitov 17'; Chinedu 28'	Report	Khayrullaev (yellow card) 42'; Kacharava (yellow card) 64'; Todorov (yellow card) 66'; Rodić 75'; Kuvvatov 82' (o.g.)	Stadium: Central Stadium; Attendance: 1,865; Referee: Gʻayrat Djurayev

16 August 2026 17	Nasaf	1–2	Pakhtakor	Qarshi
15:00 UZT (UTC+5)	Rustamov (yellow card) 30'; Mukhiddinov 48'; Abdunazarov (yellow card) 55'; Gaybullaev (yellow card) 87'	Report	Davronov 15' (o.g.); Khamdamov (yellow card) 45+5'; Sabirkhodjaev (yellow card) 52'; Bozorov 71'	Stadium: Markaziy Stadium; Attendance: 6,370; Referee: Asker Najafaliyev

21 August 2026 18	Pakhtakor	0–0	Surkhon	Tashkent
16:00 UZT (UTC+5)	Alijonov (yellow card) 12'; Tahseen (yellow card) 74'; Mozgovoy (yellow card) 90+12'	Report	Ashurboev (yellow card) 43'; Mirusmonov (yellow card) 68'; Boymurodov (yellow card) 89'; Abdukhamidov (yellow card) 90+10'	Stadium: Central Stadium; Attendance: 1,835; Referee: Jasur Muxtarov

25 August 2026 19	Dinamo Samarqand	1–1	Pakhtakor	Samarkand
20:00 UZT (UTC+5)	Amonov (yellow card) 45+1'; Urmonjonov (yellow card) 58'; Abdurahmonov 85'	Report	Buriev (yellow card) 45+1'; Ibrokhimov (yellow card) 45+3'; Erkinov 60'	Stadium: Dinamo Samarkand Stadium; Attendance: 12,620; Referee: Ilgiz Tantashev

4 September 2026 20	Pakhtakor	3–0	Andijon	Tashkent
20:10 UZT (UTC+5)	Tahseen 21'; Sabirkhodjaev 29'; Abdumazhidov 69'; Mozgovoy (yellow card) 76'	Report	Potapov (yellow card) 60'	Stadium: Central Stadium; Attendance: 4,332; Referee: Dostonbek Rahmonov

9 September 2026 21	AGMK	1–3	Pakhtakor	Olmaliq
14:30 UZT (UTC+5)	Toirov (yellow card) 33'; Papava 82'	Report	Hussein 4'; Ibrokhimov 24' (yellow card) 39'; Khamdamov 65'; Sabirkhodjaev (yellow card) 74'	Stadium: AGMK Stadium; Attendance: 4,064; Referee: Firdavs Norsafarov

19 September 2026 22	Mash'al	1–2	Pakhtakor	Gʻuzor
14:00 UZT (UTC+5)	Ismoilov (yellow card) 6'; Rakhimov (yellow card) 34'; Askarov (red card) 90+1'; Murtozoyev 90+11' (pen.)	Report	Pouraliganji (red card) 11'; Flamarion 51', 77'; Sabirkhodjaev (yellow card) 85'; Buriev (yellow card) 90+4'	Stadium: G'uzor Stadium; Attendance: 1,061; Referee: Gʻayrat Djurayev

9 October 2026 23	Pakhtakor	3–1	Bunyodkor	Tashkent
20:00 UZT (UTC+5)	Tahseen 42'; Alijonov (yellow card) 51'; Khamdamov 73'; Chinedu 90+2'	Report	Abdunabiev 56' (yellow card) 57'; Tulkinbekov (yellow card) 78'; Naimov (yellow card) 90+5'	Stadium: Central Stadium; Attendance: 2,042; Referee: Asker Nazhafaliev

17 October 2026 24	Navbahor Namangan	1–1	Pakhtakor	Namangan
15:00UZT (UTC+5)	Komilov (yellow card) 40'; Jiyanov (penalty missed) 55'; Ilić (yellow card) 58'; Khamraliev 84'; Rakhimjonov (yellow card) 90+5'	Report	Sabirkhodjaev (yellow card) 31'; Saitov (yellow card) 35'; Tahseen 43'; Abdumazhidov (yellow card) 49'; Mozgovoy (yellow card) 83'	Stadium: Markaziy Stadium; Attendance: 22,751; Referee: Ilgiz Tantashev

23 October 2026 25	Pakhtakor	1–3	Neftchi Fergana	Tashkent
15:00 UZT (UTC+5)	Khamdamov 24' (pen.); Nasrullaev (yellow card) 45'; Tahseen (yellow card) 73'; Abdullaev (red card) 89'	Report	Perica 55'; Kouao 66'; Alibaev (yellow card) 80'; Iskanderov 90' (pen.)	Stadium: Central Stadium; Attendance: 7,332; Referee: Firdavs Norsafarov

30 October 2026 26	Khorazm	0–1	Pakhtakor	Urgench
13:30 UZT (UTC+5)	Ortikboev (yellow card) 24'; Khamidzhonov (yellow card) 90+6'; Otakhonov (red card) 90+6'	Report	Pouraliganji (yellow card) 31'; Dilshodbekov (yellow card) 49'; Karimov 89'; Tahseen (red card) 90+6'; Sabirkhodjaev (yellow card) 90+6'	Stadium: Xorazm Stadium; Attendance: 6,220; Referee: Rustam Choriyev

8 November 2026 27	Pakhtakor	3–1	Kokand 1912	Tashkent
13:15 UZT (UTC+5)	Nasrullaev 6'; Chinedu 9'; Khamdamov 90'	Report	Khasanov (yellow card) 31'; Tabatadze 61'	Stadium: Central Stadium; Attendance: 1,936; Referee: Asker Najafaliyev

20 November 2026 28	Lokomotiv Tashkent	–	Pakhtakor	Tashkent
12:00 UZT (UTC+5)		Report		Stadium: Lokomotiv Stadium

=== Uzbek Cup ===
==== Group stage ====
13 May 2026 1	Pakhtakor	4–1	Yapan Fergana	Tashkent
15:00 UZT (UTC+5)	Ibrokhimov 5', 82'; Tahseen 71'; Flamarion 80'	Report	Tursunov (yellow card) 10'; Ibrohimkhanov (yellow card) 36'; Odiljonov 87'	Stadium: Central Stadium; Attendance: 856; Referee: Khushnud Suyunbayev

18 May 2026 2	Surkhon	2–0	Pakhtakor	Tashkent
19:00 UZT (UTC+5)	Abdullajonov 20'; Shamsiyev (yellow card) 71'; Chinedu 74'; Boymurodov (yellow card) 78'; Yusupov (yellow card) 82'	Report	Buriev (yellow card) 73'; Azmiddinov (yellow card) 90'	Stadium: Central Stadium; Attendance: 565; Referee: Ravshan Abduvakhidov

27 May 2026 3	Pakhtakor	3–0	Kattakurgan	Tashkent
19:00 UZT (UTC+5)	Turdimurodov 14', 73'; Ibrokhimov 76'	Report		Stadium: Central Stadium; Attendance: 658; Referee: Shavkat Nasibullayev

==== Knockout stages ====
29 August 2026 Last 16	Neftchi Fergana	1–0	Pakhtakor	Fergana
20:00 UZT (UTC+5)	Perica 81'; Sayfiev (yellow card) 90+2'	Report	Alijonov (yellow card) 74'; Tahseen (yellow card) 90+2'	Stadium: Istiqlol Stadium; Attendance: 18,777; Referee: Shavkat Nasibullayev

=== AFC Champions League Elite ===
==== Preliminary stage ====
11 August 2026 Qualifying play-offs	Pakhtakor (Uzbekistan)	3–0	(Jordan) Al-Hussein	Tashkent, Uzbekistan
20:00 UZT (UTC+5)	Khamdamov 7', 30'; Resan 52'	Report		Stadium: Central Stadium; Attendance: 2,500; Referee: Kim Woo-sung (South Korea)

==== League stage ====
Pos	Team	Pld	W	D	L	GF	GA	GD	Pts	Qualification
1	(United Arab Emirates) Al Ain	4	4	0	0	14	3	+11	12	Advance to round of 16
2	(Saudi Arabia) Al-Hilal	4	3	0	1	7	4	+3	9	Advance to round of 16
3	(Iran) Esteghlal	4	3	0	1	6	3	+3	9	Advance to round of 16
4	(United Arab Emirates) Shabab Al Ahli	4	3	0	1	5	3	+2	9	Advance to round of 16
5	(Saudi Arabia) Al-Qadsiah	4	2	2	0	9	3	+6	8	Advance to round of 16
6	(Saudi Arabia) Al-Ahli	4	2	2	0	6	3	+3	8	Advance to round of 16
7	(Saudi Arabia) Al-Nassr	3	2	0	1	9	7	+2	6	Advance to round of 16
8	(Qatar) Al-Shamal	4	1	2	1	4	3	+1	5	Advance to round of 16
9	(Uzbekistan) Neftchi	4	1	1	2	5	7	−2	4	
10	(Saudi Arabia) Al-Ittihad	4	1	1	2	5	8	−3	4	
11	(United Arab Emirates) Al Wasl	3	1	0	2	6	8	−2	3	
12	(Iraq) Al-Quwa Al-Jawiya	4	1	0	3	5	9	−4	3	
13	(Iran) Tractor	4	0	2	2	3	5	−2	2	
14	(Uzbekistan) Pakhtakor	4	0	2	2	4	9	−5	2	
15	(Qatar) Al Sadd	4	0	2	2	1	6	−5	2	
16	(Qatar) Al-Gharafa	4	0	0	4	3	11	−8	0	

Updated to match(es) played on 3 November 2026. Source: AFC
Rules for classification: 1) points; 2) goal difference; 3) number of goals scored; 4) number of matches won; 5) penalty shoot-out if only two teams remain tied and played each other on the final matchday 6) fair play ranking; 7) drawing of lots

14 September 2026 1	Al-Ahli (Saudi Arabia)	1–1	(Uzbekistan) Pakhtakor	Jeddah, Saudi Arabia
23:15 UZT (UTC+5)	Al-Shamat (yellow card) 64'; Firas 90+3'; Spertsyan (yellow card) 90+6'	Report	Ibrokhimov (yellow card) 63'; Flamarion 86'	Stadium: King Abdullah Sports City Stadium; Attendance: 15,145; Referee: Abdullah Jamali (Kuwait)

12 October 2026 2	Pakhtakor (Uzbekistan)	1–1	(Saudi Arabia) Al-Qadsiah	Tashkent, Uzbekistan
18:45 UZT (UTC+5)	Mozgovoy (yellow card) 33'; Khamdamov 89' (pen.)	Report	Reijnders 35'; Diabaté (yellow card) 62'	Stadium: Central Stadium; Attendance: 2,650; Referee: Choi Hyun-jai (South Korea)

26 October 2026 3	Al-Quwa Al-Jawiya (Iraq)	1–0	(Uzbekistan) Pakhtakor	Baghdad, Iraq
23:15 UZT (UTC+5)	Abdul-Amir 70'; Boudrama (yellow card) 82'	Report	Buriev 31'; Sabirkhodjaev (yellow card) 78'	Stadium: Al-Madina International Stadium; Attendance: 4,372; Referee: Salman Falahi (Qatar)

2 November 2026 4	Pakhtakor (Uzbekistan)	2–6	(Saudi Arabia) Al-Nassr	Tashkent, Uzbekistan
18:45 UZT (UTC+5)	Karimov (yellow card) 32'; Flamarion 36'; Nasrullaev (yellow card) 57'; Khamdamov 75'	Report	Al-Hamdan 15'; João Félix 17', 32'; Al-Amri 53'; Ghareeb 62'; Ângelo 79'	Stadium: Central Stadium; Attendance: 28,153; Referee: Alex King (Australia)

23 November 2026 5	Al-Ittihad (Saudi Arabia)	–	(Uzbekistan) Pakhtakor	Jeddah, Saudi Arabia
23:45UZT (UTC+5)				Stadium: King Abdullah Sports City Stadium

7 December 2026 6	Pakhtakor (Uzbekistan)	–	(Iran) Tractor	Tashkent, Uzbekistan
18:45 UZT (UTC+5)				Stadium: Central Stadium

Matches 7 & 8 will take place during the 2027 season.

== Squad statistics ==
As of match played 8 November 2026

=== Appearances and goals ===
No.	Pos	Nat	Player	Total		Super League		Uzbek Cup		Super Cup		AFC Champions League Elite	
No.	Pos	Nat	Player	Apps	Goals	Apps	Goals	Apps	Goals	Apps	Goals	Apps	Goals
3	DF	(Uzbekistan) UZB	Shakhzod Azmiddinov	6	1	0+3	1	3	0	0	0	0	0
4	DF	(Iraq) IRQ	Zaid Tahseen	27	4	19+1	3	2	1	1	0	4	0
5	DF	(Iran) IRI	Morteza Pouraliganji	7	0	3+1	0	0	0	0	0	2+1	0
6	MF	(Uzbekistan) UZB	Sardor Mirkobilov	3	0	0+2	0	0+1	0	0	0	0	0
7	DF	(Uzbekistan) UZB	Khojiakbar Alijonov	29	1	21+2	1	1	0	1	0	1+3	0
8	DF	(Uzbekistan) UZB	Dilshod Saitov	23	1	9+6	1	3+1	0	0+1	0	3	0
9	MF	(Uzbekistan) UZB	Ibrokhim Ibrokhimov	28	4	11+8	1	3	3	1	0	2+3	0
10	MF	(Uzbekistan) UZB	Akmal Mozgovoy	30	0	21+3	0	1	0	1	0	4	0
11	MF	(Uzbekistan) UZB	Khojimat Erkinov	23	2	8+11	2	1+1	0	0+1	0	0+1	0
12	GK	(Uzbekistan) UZB	Vladimir Nazarov	13	0	8+1	0	0	0	1	0	3	0
13	DF	(Uzbekistan) UZB	Muhammadali Dilshodbekov	3	0	0+2	0	0	0	0	0	0+1	0
16	DF	(Uzbekistan) UZB	Miraziz Abdukarimov	1	0	0	0	0+1	0	0	0	0	0
17	MF	(Uzbekistan) UZB	Dostonbek Khamdamov	32	15	14+11	11	1	0	1	0	2+3	4
18	MF	(Uzbekistan) UZB	Abubakir Shukurullaev	1	0	0	0	0+1	0	0	0	0	0
20	DF	(Uzbekistan) UZB	Dilshod Abdullaev	3	0	0+1	0	2	0	0	0	0	0
21	MF	(Iraq) IRQ	Bashar Resan	35	4	16+9	3	3+1	0	1	0	5	1
22	DF	(Uzbekistan) UZB	Mukhammad-Bobur Karimov	5	1	1+2	1	0	0	0	0	2	0
23	MF	(Uzbekistan) UZB	Abdurauf Buriev	33	0	19+5	0	4	0	0	0	5	0
26	FW	(Uzbekistan) UZB	Davron Tulaganov	6	0	1+2	0	0+3	0	0	0	0	0
27	MF	(Uzbekistan) UZB	Sardor Sabirkhodjaev	33	2	24+1	2	3+1	0	1	0	2+1	0
29	FW	(Iraq) IRQ	Aymen Hussein	15	1	5+4	1	1	0	0	0	3+2	0
33	MF	(Uzbekistan) UZB	Kuvanishbek Saydaliev	2	0	0+1	0	0	0	0	0	0+1	0
34	DF	(Uzbekistan) UZB	Sherzod Nasrullaev	29	0	21+2	0	1	0	1	0	4	0
35	GK	(Uzbekistan) UZB	Sanjar Kuvvatov	26	1	20	1	4	0	0	0	2	0
44	DF	(Uzbekistan) UZB	Diyor Ermanov	2	0	0	0	1+1	0	0	0	0	0
50	FW	(Brazil) BRA	Flamarion	34	9	16+8	6	3+1	1	0+1	0	4+1	2
55	DF	(Uzbekistan) UZB	Mukhammadrasul Abdumazhidov	30	1	22	1	2	0	1	0	5	0
77	MF	(Uzbekistan) UZB	Oybek Bozorov	24	1	12+6	1	3	0	0	0	0+3	0
90	FW	(Nigeria) NGR	Stephen Chinedu	21	4	9+6	4	0+1	0	0	0	2+3	0
Players away on loan:
14	FW	(Uzbekistan) UZB	Rustam Turdimurodov	14	5	6+6	3	1	2	1	0	0	0
Players who left Pakhtakor during the season:
5	DF	(Uzbekistan) UZB	Mukhammadkodir Khamraliev	11	1	8+2	1	1	0	0	0	0	0
19	FW	(Poland) POL	Piotr Parzyszek	13	2	3+7	2	0+2	0	0+1	0	0	0

=== Goal scorers ===
Place	Position	Nation	Number	Name	Super League	Uzbekistan Cup	Super Cup	AFC Champions League Elite	Total
1	MF	(Uzbekistan)	17	Dostonbek Khamdamov	11	0	0	4	15
2	FW	(Brazil)	50	Flamarion	6	1	0	2	9
3	FW	(Uzbekistan)	14	Rustam Turdimurodov	3	2	0	0	5
3	FW	(Nigeria)	90	Stephen Chinedu	4	0	0	0	4
3	DF	(Iraq)	4	Zaid Tahseen	3	1	0	0	4
3	MF	(Iraq)	21	Bashar Resan	3	0	0	1	4
3	MF	(Uzbekistan)	9	Ibrokhim Ibrokhimov	1	3	0	0	4
8	FW	(Poland)	19	Piotr Parzyszek	2	0	0	0	2
8	MF	(Uzbekistan)	11	Khojimat Erkinov	2	0	0	0	2
8	MF	(Uzbekistan)	27	Sardor Sabirkhodjaev	2	0	0	0	2
8				Own goal	2	0	0	0	2
12	DF	(Uzbekistan)	5	Mukhammadkodir Khamraliev	1	0	0	0	1
12	DF	(Uzbekistan)	7	Khojiakbar Alijonov	1	0	0	0	1
12	DF	(Uzbekistan)	3	Shakhzod Azmiddinov	1	0	0	0	1
12	DF	(Uzbekistan)	8	Dilshod Saitov	1	0	0	0	1
12	MF	(Uzbekistan)	77	Oybek Bozorov	1	0	0	0	1
12	DF	(Uzbekistan)	55	Mukhammadrasul Abdumazhidov	1	0	0	0	1
12	FW	(Iraq)	29	Aymen Hussein	1	0	0	0	1
12	DF	(Uzbekistan)	22	Mukhammad-Bobur Karimov	1	0	0	0	1
12	DF	(Uzbekistan)	34	Sherzod Nasrullaev	1	0	0	0	1
				TOTALS	48	7	0	7	62

=== Clean sheets ===
Place	Position	Nation	Number	Name	Super League	Uzbekistan Cup	Super Cup	AFC Champions League Elite	Total
1	GK	(Uzbekistan)	35	Sanjar Kuvvatov	6	1	0	1	8
2	GK	(Uzbekistan)	12	Vladimir Nazarov	2	0	0	0	2
				TOTALS	8	1	0	1	10

=== Disciplinary record ===
Number	Nation	Position	Name	Super League		Uzbekistan Cup		Super Cup		AFC Champions League Elite		Total	
Number	Nation	Position	Name	Yellow card	Red card	Yellow card	Red card	Yellow card	Red card	Yellow card	Red card	Yellow card	Red card
3	(Uzbekistan)	DF	Shakhzod Azmiddinov	0	0	1	0	0	0	0	0	1	0
4	(Iraq)	DF	Zaid Tahseen	5	1	1	0	0	0	1	0	7	1
5	(Uzbekistan)	DF	Mukhammadkodir Khamraliev	2	1	0	0	0	0	0	0	2	1
7	(Uzbekistan)	DF	Khojiakbar Alijonov	3	0	1	0	0	0	0	0	4	0
8	(Uzbekistan)	DF	Dilshod Saitov	1	0	0	0	0	0	0	0	1	0
9	(Uzbekistan)	MF	Ibrokhim Ibrokhimov	3	0	0	0	0	0	1	0	4	0
10	(Uzbekistan)	MF	Akmal Mozgovoy	5	0	0	0	0	0	1	0	6	0
13	(Uzbekistan)	DF	Muhammadali Dilshodbekov	1	0	0	0	0	0	0	0	1	0
17	(Uzbekistan)	MF	Dostonbek Khamdamov	1	0	0	0	0	0	0	0	1	0
20	(Uzbekistan)	DF	Dilshod Abdullaev	0	1	0	0	0	0	0	0	0	1
21	(Iraq)	MF	Bashar Resan	1	0	0	0	0	0	0	0	1	0
22	(Uzbekistan)	DF	Mukhammad-Bobur Karimov	0	0	0	0	0	0	1	0	1	0
23	(Uzbekistan)	MF	Abdurauf Buriev	4	0	1	0	0	0	1	0	6	0
27	(Uzbekistan)	MF	Sardor Sabirkhodjaev	5	0	0	0	0	0	1	0	6	0
34	(Uzbekistan)	DF	Sherzod Nasrullaev	3	0	0	0	0	0	1	0	4	0
35	(Uzbekistan)	GK	Sanjar Kuvvatov	2	0	0	0	0	0	0	0	2	0
50	(Brazil)	FW	Flamarion	0	0	0	0	0	0	1	0	1	0
55	(Uzbekistan)	DF	Mukhammadrasul Abdumazhidov	2	0	0	0	0	0	0	0	2	0
90	(Nigeria)	FW	Stephen Chinedu	1	0	0	0	0	0	0	0	1	0
Players away on loan:
14	(Uzbekistan)	FW	Rustam Turdimurodov	2	0	0	0	0	0	0	0	2	0
Players who left Pakhtakor during the season:
			TOTALS	41	3	4	0	0	0	8	0	53	3
