= 2026 Uzbekistan Cup =

Uzbekistan Cup
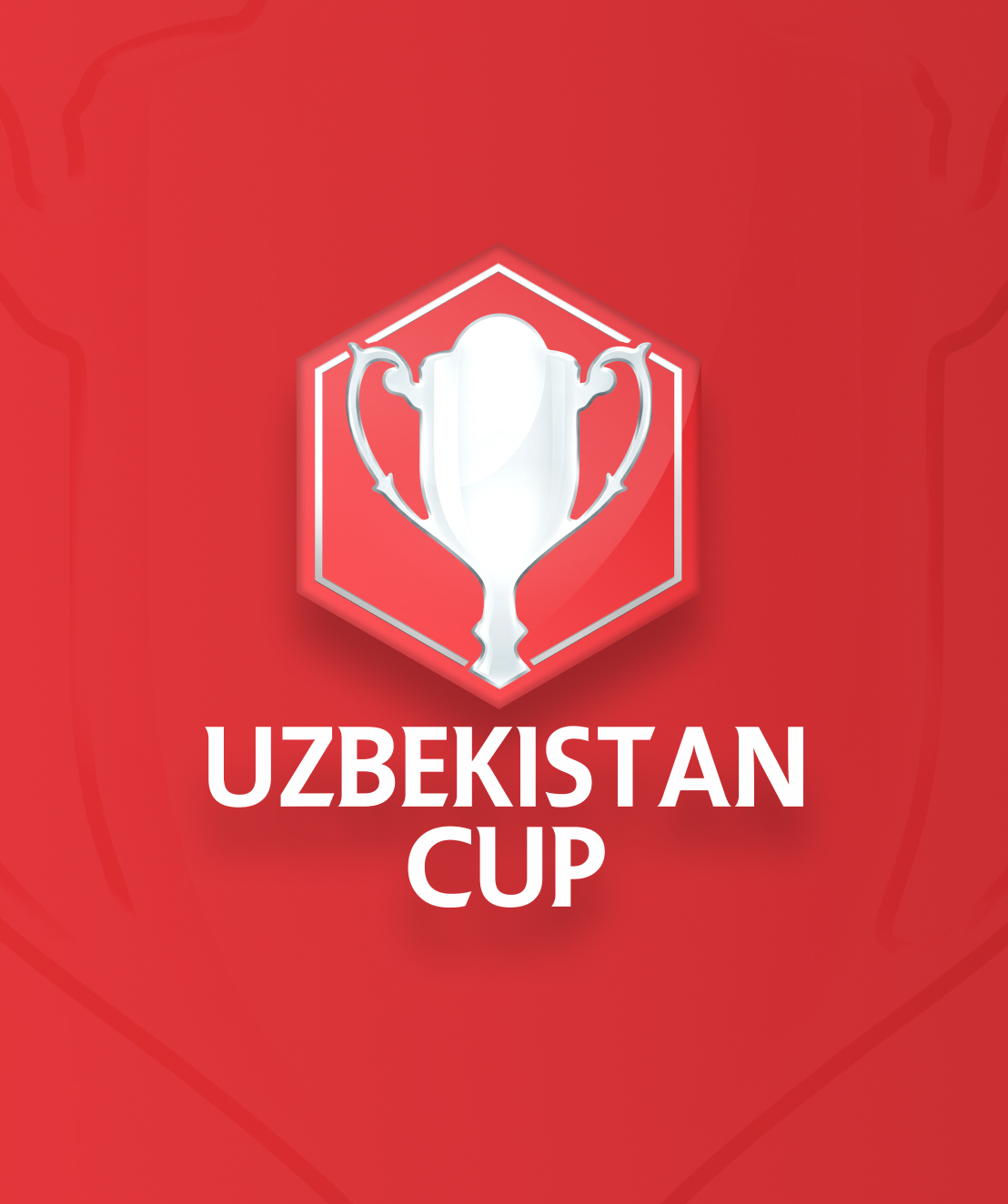
- Season: 2026
- Dates: March 22, 2026 to TBD
- Country: Uzbekistan
- Teams: 45

2026 Uzbekistan Cup (Uzbek: Футбол бўйича 2026–йилги Ўзбекистон Кубоги) is the 36th season of the annual Uzbekistan Cup competition.

The semi-finals and finals will be held centrally in Tashkent.

== Season events ==
In order to optimize the training schedule for the national championship and national team, the 2026 group stage matches were held centrally between May 8 and 26. According to the regulations, clubs are required to participate in cup matches, regardless of how many players they provide to the national team.

Lower league teams Gazalkent (which beat Kokand 1912 in the 1/8 finals) and Guliston, representatives of the Pro League and the First League, unexpectedly reached the quarterfinals.

== Qualifying round ==
=== First qualifying round ===
March 22, 2025
12:00 (UTC+5)

Azur	2–1	Barkamol
Sagdullayev 11'; Bobojonov 71'	Report	Nuriddinov 14'

Odil Junior Stadium, Tashkent
Attendance: 60
Referee: Sardor Mirodilov

March 22, 2025
15:00 (UTC+5)

Guliston	2–0	FC Sonyc X
Shodiyev 40'; Umurzoqov 50'	Report

Odil Junior Stadium, Tashkent
Attendance: 257
Referee: Anvar Ismoilov

March 23, 2025
12:00 (UTC+5)

Samarkand FA	0–3	Sherdor
	Report	Sobirov 5'; Kozimov 6'; Shamsiddinov 53'

Odil Junior Stadium, Tashkent
Attendance: 47
Referee: Farrukh Yansupov

March 23, 2025
15:00 (UTC+5)

Havokand	1–1	Tashkent FA
Valiyev 61'	Report	Abduhakimov 26'
Penalties
	5–4

Odil Junior Stadium, Tashkent
Attendance: 57

=== Second qualifying round ===
March 24, 2025
12:00 (UTC+5)

Karakalpakstan FA	2–1	Tashkent RFA
Nizanov 26', 67'	Report	Namozov 70'

Odil Junior Stadium, Tashkent
Attendance: 74
Referee: Nikita Mustafin

March 24, 2025
15:00 (UTC+5)

Ahmedov	5–2	Navoi FA
Salomov 20'; Orifxonov 51', 57'; Muhammadno'monov 63'; Ro'ziqulov 88'	Report	Tursunov 22'; Roʻzimurodov 74'

Odil Junior Stadium, Tashkent
Attendance: 70
Referee: Alisher Rahimqulov

March 25, 2025
12:00 (UTC+5)

Doʻstlik	1–1	Azur
Rahmonov 87' (pen.)	Report	Sayidov 65'
Penalties
	5–6

Odil Junior Stadium, Tashkent
Attendance: 86
Referee: Shaxboz Azimov

March 25, 2025
15:00 (UTC+5)

Lokomotiv BFK	0–1	Guliston
	Report	Norbekov 48'

Odil Junior Stadium, Tashkent
Attendance: 77
Referee: Roman Irgashev

March 26, 2026
12:00 (UTC+5)

Oqtepa	1–1	Sherdor
Gʻulomov 20'	Report	Kozimov 19'
Penalties
	3–0

Odil Junior Stadium, Tashkent
Attendance: 83
Referee: Aziz Jumanov

March 26, 2026
15:00 (UTC+5)

Jizzakh FA	1–1	Havokand
Rashidov 3'	Report	Turobjonov 82'
Penalties
	3–4

Odil Junior Stadium, Tashkent
Attendance: 35
Referee: Sanjar Nazarov

=== Third qualifying round ===
March 28, 2026
12:00 (UTC+5)

Karakalpakstan FA	3–1	Akhmedov
Xudoyberdiyev 7', 49'; Mahmudov 59'	Report	Salomov 41'

Odil Junior Stadium, Tashkent
Attendance: 24
Referee: Nurbek Sheraliyev

March 29, 2026
12:00 (UTC+5)

Azur	0–1	Guliston
	Report	Yunusov 87'

Odil Junior Stadium, Tashkent
Attendance: 44
Referee: Maʼmurjon Ilhomov

March 29, 2026
12:00 (UTC+5)

Oqtepa	3–3	Havokand
Baxtiyorov 8', 13'; Omonov 67'	Report	Valiyev 23' (pen.); Moʻminov 51'; Toshtemirov 83'
Penalties
	2–3

Odil Junior Stadium, Tashkent
Attendance: 78
Referee: Nikita Mustafin

== Group stage ==
=== A group ===
Pos	Team	Pld	W	D	L	GF	GA	GD	Pts	Qualification
1	OKMK	3	2	1	0	8	6	+2	7	Qualifying for the play-offs
2	Kokand 1912	3	2	0	1	5	3	+2	6	Qualifying for the play-offs
3	Metallurg	3	1	1	1	5	6	−1	4	
4	Aral	3	0	0	3	2	5	−3	0	

Updated to match(es) played on Toʻliq. Source: UzPFL
Rules for classification: Group stage tiebreakers

May 10, 2026 1	OKMK	3–3	Metallurg	Olmaliq
18:00 (UTC+5)	Sobirjonov 12', 70'; Karimov 25'	Report	Bošnjak 55'; Maxuel 87', 90+1'	Stadium: OKMK Stadium; Attendance: 1104; Referee: Jasur Muxtorov

May 10, 2026 1	Aral	0–1	Kokand 1912	Nukus
17:30 (UTC+5)		Report	Nimely 84'	Stadium: NOPSTTM stadioni Attendance: 930; Referee: Ravshan Abduvohidov

May 16, 2026 2	Kokand 1912	2–3	OKMK	Kokand
19:00 (UTC+5)	Siddiqov 13'; Giorgadze 62'	Report	Papava 45+2'; Kojic 51'; Tursunqulov 67'	Stadium: Kokand markaziy Stadium; Attendance: 3116; Referee: Temurbek Toʻxtasinov

May 16, 2026 2	Metallurg	2–1	Aral	Bekobod
18:00 (UTC+5)	Maxuel 49', 75'	Report	Krasnov 89'	Stadium: Metallurg Stadium; Attendance: 2112; Referee: Najmiddin Roʻziyev

May 20, 2026 3	OKMK	2–1	Aral	Olmaliq
19:00 (UTC+5)	Abdurahmonov 36'; Toirov 45+1'	Report	Krasnov 67'	Stadium: OKMK Stadium; Attendance: 468; Referee: Asker Najafaliyev

May 20, 2026 3	Metallurg	0–2	Kokand 1912	Bekobod
19:00 (UTC+5)		Report	Gadoyev 48'; Hasanov 80'	Stadium: Metallurg Stadium; Attendance: 1701; Referee: Ilgiz Tantashev

=== B group ===
Pos	Team	Pld	W	D	L	GF	GA	GD	Pts	Qualification
1	Gʻazalkent	3	2	0	1	5	7	−2	6	Qualifying for the play-offs
2	Lokomotiv	3	1	1	1	7	4	+3	4	Qualifying for the play-offs
3	Dinamo	3	1	1	1	8	7	+1	4	
4	Lochin	3	1	0	2	3	5	−2	3	

Updated to match(es) played on Full. Source: UzPFL
Rules for classification: Group stage tiebreakers

May 10, 2026 1	Dinamo	2–3	Gʻazalkent	Samarqand
18:00 (UTC+5)	Hoshimov 52'; Hojimirzayev 90+2'	Report	Fayzullayev 18'; Mirqodirov 66', 86'	Stadium: Dinamo Stadium; Attendance: 1125; Referee: Gulshoda Saidqulova

May 10, 2026 1	Lochin	1–0	Lokomotiv	Qarshi
17:00 (UTC+5)	Mukarov 56'	Report		Stadium: Geolog Stadium; Attendance: 173; Referee: Nurbek Sheraliyev

May 15, 2026 2	Lokomotiv	2–2	Dinamo	Toshkent
18:00 (UTC+5)	Raimov 45+2'; Shodiboyev 86'	Report	Qodirqulov 42'; Abdurahmonov 52'	Stadium: Lokomotiv Stadium; Attendance: 2869; Referee: Ilgiz Tantashev

May 15, 2026 2	Gʻazalkent	1–0	Lochin	Toshkent
19:30 (UTC+5)	Tojiyev 55'	Report		Stadium: Bunyodkor Stadium; Attendance: 234; Referee: Olim Toʻychiboyev

May 20, 2026 3	Dinamo	4–2	Lochin	Samarqand
18:00 (UTC+5)	Abdurahmonov 17'; Hojimirzayev 32', 51', 76'	Report	Toʻxtayev 86', 88' (pen.)	Stadium: Dinamo Stadium; Attendance: 1263; Referee: Alisher Rahimqulov

May 20, 2026 3	Gʻazalkent	1–5	Lokomotiv	Toshkent
18:00 (UTC+5)	Abdullayev 88' (pen.)	Report	Nurulloyev 7'; T. Abduxoliqov 8', 53', 77'; Zoirov 86'	Stadium: Lokomotiv; Attendance: 2312; Referee: Akobirxoʻja Shukurullayev

=== C group ===
Pos	Team	Pld	W	D	L	GF	GA	GD	Pts	Qualification
1	Sogdiana	3	3	0	0	10	4	+6	9	Qualifying for the play-offs
2	Olimpik MobiUz	3	2	0	1	5	4	+1	6	Qualifying for the play-offs
3	Mashʼal	3	1	0	2	4	5	−1	3	
4	Respublika FA	3	0	0	3	2	8	−6	0	

Updated to match(es) played on Toʻliq. Source: UzPFL
Rules for classification: Group stage tiebreakers

May 9, 2026 1	Soʻgʻdiyona	5–2	Respublika FA	Zomin
17:00 (UTC+5)	Mulić 14', 53'; Boljević 42'; Karimov 68'; Hoshimov 75'	Report	Akbarov 59'; Jumadullayev 84'	Stadium: Zaamin Stadium; Attendance: 745; Referee: Sanjar Nazarov

May 9, 2026 1	Olimpik MobiUz	3–1	Mashʼal	Toshkent
18:00 (UTC+5)	Joʻrayev 14', 73'; Maʼrifaliyev 45'	Report	Vaniyev 16'	Stadium: JAR Stadium; Attendance: 312; Referee: Abdurashid Xudoyberganov

May 14, 2026 2	Mashʼal	1–2	Soʻgʻdiyona	Muborak
(UTC+5)	Gʻanixonov 68'	Report	Abdurashidov 8'; Karimov 45+1'	Stadium: Bahrom Vafoev Stadium; Attendance: 1520; Referee: Nikita Mustafin

May 14, 2026 2	Respublika FA	0–1	Olimpik MobiUz	Toshkent
(UTC+5)		Report	Haydarov	Stadium: Doʻstlik Stadium; Attendance: 103; Referee: Maʼmurjon Ilhomov

May 19, 2026 3	Soʻgʻdiyona	3–1	Olimpik MobiUz	Zaamin
18:00 (UTC+5)	Hoshimov 60' (pen.); Sultonov 88'; Abdumajidov 90+4'	Report	Zohidov 21'	Stadium: Zomin; Attendance: 235; Referee: Alisher Toʻxtasinov

May 19, 2026 3	Respublika FA	0–2	Mashʼal	Toshkent viloyati
18:00 (UTC+5)		Report	Murtozoyev 66'; Parmonqulov 87'	Stadium: Doʻstlik Stadium; Attendance: 73; Referee: Asadbek Qosimjonov

=== D group ===
Pos	Team	Pld	W	D	L	GF	GA	GD	Pts	Qualification
1	Neftchi	3	2	1	0	12	3	+9	7	Qualifying for the play-offs
2	Guliston	3	2	0	1	6	7	−1	6	Qualifying for the play-offs
3	Buxoro	3	1	1	1	3	5	−2	4	
4	BuxDU	3	0	0	3	3	9	−6	0	

Updated to match(es) played on Toʻliq. Source: UzPFL
Rules for classification: Group stage tiebreakers

May 11, 2026 1	Neftchi	6–1	Guliston	Fargʻona
19:00 (UTC+5)	Gʻiyosov 17'; Marušić 20', 53'; Jovović 29'; Jumayev 59', 68'	Report	Norbekov 48'	Stadium: Istiqlol Stadium; Attendance: 5,210; Referee: Akmal Rahimov

May 11, 2026 1	BuxDU	1–2	Buxoro	Buxoro
19:00 (UTC+5)	Shamsiddinov 30'	Report	Ubaydullayev 52', 63'	Stadium: Buxoro FA stadioni Attendance: 2380; Referee: Feruzbek Hidoyatov

May 22, 2026 2	Buxoro	0–0	Neftchi	Buxoro
19:00 (UTC+5)		Report		Stadium: Buxoro FA stadioni Attendance: 6670; Referee: Jasur Muxtorov

May 22, 2026 2	Guliston	1–0	BuxDU	Yangiyer
(UTC+5)	Rajabov 69'	Report		Stadium: Yangiyer Stadium; Attendance: 799; Referee: Aziz Jumanov

May 26, 2026 3	Neftchi	6–2	BuxDU	Fargʻona
17:00	Perica 12', 36'; Fomin 28'; Gʻiyosov 45'; Sarsenbayev 69'; Ratinho 73'	Report	Ashurov 54'; Toʻrayev 82'	Stadium: Istiqlol Stadium; Attendance: 2153; Referee: Gʻayrat Joʻrayev

May 26, 2026 3	Guliston	4–1	Buxoro	Yangiyer
17:00 (UTC+5)	Sobirjonov 27'; Umurzoqov 45+2', 72'; Norbekov 76'	Report	Ubaydullayev 9'	Stadium: Yangiyer Stadium; Attendance: 550; Referee: Dias Galeyev

=== E group ===
Pos	Team	Pld	W	D	L	GF	GA	GD	Pts	Qualification
1	Bunyodkor	3	3	0	0	8	1	+7	9	Qualifying for the play-offs
2	QMU Jayxun	3	2	0	1	4	5	−1	6	Qualifying for the play-offs
3	Qizilqum	3	1	0	2	5	6	−1	3	
4	TerDU	3	0	0	3	2	7	−5	0	

Updated to match(es) played on Toʻliq. Source: UzPFL
Rules for classification: Group stage tiebreakers

May 11, 2026 1	Bunyodkor	2–1	TerDU	Tashkent
19:00 (UTC+5)	Anvarov 5'; Tursunmahammadov 60'	Report	Qoʻzimurodov 9'	Stadium: Bunyodkor Stadium; Attendance: 398; Referee: Maʼmurjon Ilhomov

May 11, 2026 1	QMU Jayxun	3–1	Qizilqum	Nukus
17:30 (UTC+5)	Nuriddinov 35', 55' (pen.); Qutiboyev 75'	Report	Muzaffarov 48'	Stadium: NOPSTTM; Attendance: 821; Referee: Nikita Mustafin

May 17, 2026 2	TerDU	0–1	QMU Jayxun	Termiz
17:00 (UTC+5)		Report	Sdikov 43'	Stadium: Surxon arena. Zaxira maydoni Attendance: 273; Referee: Nayim Qosimov

May 17, 2026 2	Qizilqum	0–2	Bunyodkor	Navoiy
19:00 (UTC+5)		Report	Umarov 7'; Neʼmatjonov 26'	Stadium: Yoshlar SM; Attendance: 5254; Referee: Shavkat Nasibullayev

May 24, 2026 3	Bunyodkor	4–0	QMU Jayxun	Toshkent
19:00 (UTC+5)	Tursunmahammadov 10'; Abdusalomov 23'; Neʼmatjonov 29', 52'	Report		Stadium: Bunyodkor Stadium; Attendance: 211; Referee: Ahrol Risqullayev

May 24, 2026 3	TerDU	1–4	Qizilqum	Navoiy
19:00 (UTC+5)	Hushbaqov 61'	Report	Usmonov 9', 71'; Rahmatullayev 81'; Shchebetun 87'	Stadium: Yoshlar SM; Attendance: 1763; Referee: Firdavs Norsafarov

=== F group ===
Pos	Team	Pld	W	D	L	GF	GA	GD	Pts	Qualification
1	Navbahor	3	2	1	0	14	2	+12	7	Qualifying for the play-offs
2	Xorazm	3	2	1	0	8	4	+4	7	Qualifying for the play-offs
3	FarDU	3	1	0	2	8	5	+3	3	
4	Qoraqalpogʻiston FA	3	0	0	3	3	22	−19	0	

Updated to match(es) played on Toʻliq. Source: UzPFL
Rules for classification: Group stage tiebreakers

May 12, 2026 1	Navbahor	9–0	Qoraqalpogʻiston FA	Toshkent
19:00 (UTC+5)	Otebayev 23' (o.g.); Fernandes 32', 68'; Kati 33'; Komilov 40'; Japaraliyev 74'; Gʻulomov 79', 87'; Ilić 90'	Report		Stadium: Olimpiya Stadium; Attendance: 218; Referee: Nasibabonu Toshmuhamedova

May 11, 2026 1	FarDU	0–1	Xorazm	Fargʻona
17:00 (UTC+5)		Report	Abelfazov 90' (o.g.)	Stadium: FarDU Stadium; Attendance: 1315; Referee: Umidjon Rahimjonov

May 18, 2026 2	Xorazm	1–1	Navbahor	Urganch
19:00 (UTC+5)	Nugumanov 55'	Report	Gʻulomov 27'	Stadium: Xorazm Stadium; Attendance: 5454; Referee: Ahrol Risqullayev

May 18, 2026 2	Qoraqalpogʻiston FA	0–7	FarDU	Nukus
18:00 (UTC+5)		Report	Abelfazov 30'; Zokirjonov 41'; Farhodov 48'; Sheripov 70'; Ayvazov 73', 88'; Komilov 75'	Stadium: NOPSTTM; Attendance: 354; Referee: Nurbek Sheraliyev

May 24, 2026 3	Navbahor	4–1	FarDU	Toshkent
19:00 (UTC+5)	Abdurahmonov 25'; Fernandes 74'; Gʻiyosov 84'; Komilov 89'	Report	Komilov 90+2'	Stadium: Olimpiya Stadium; Attendance: 210; Referee: Abdurashid Xudoyberganov

April 24, 2026 3	Qoraqalpogʻiston FA	3–6	Xorazm	Urganch
19:00 (UTC+5)	Nizanov 29', 85', 90+3'	Report	Nugumanov 10'; Abduhamidov 17'; Traoré 37'; Ahrorov 74', 74'; Ismoilov 90+2'	Stadium: Xorazm Stadium; Attendance: 2320; Referee: Umidjon Nutfullayev

=== G group ===
Pos	Team	Pld	W	D	L	GF	GA	GD	Pts	Qualification
1	Surkhon	3	2	0	1	6	4	+2	6	Qualifying for the play-offs
2	Paxtakor	3	2	0	1	7	3	+4	6	Qualifying for the play-offs
3	Yaypan	3	1	0	2	3	6	−3	3	
4	Kattaqoʻrgʻon	3	1	0	2	3	6	−3	3	

Updated to match(es) played on Toʻliq. Source: UzPFL
Rules for classification: Group stage tiebreakers

May 13, 2026 1	Kattaqoʻrgʻon	3–2	Surxon	Samarqand
17:00 (UTC+5)	Sharipov 31'; Anvarov 63'; Abdulhaqov 73'	Report	Chinedu 86'; Abduhamidov 89'	Stadium: Afrosiyob arena Attendance: 102; Referee: Nayim Qosimov

May 13, 2026 1	Paxtakor	4–1	Yaypan	Toshkent
19:00 (UTC+5)	Ibrohimov 5', 82'; Tahseen 71'; Flamarion 80'	Report	Odiljonov 87'	Stadium: Paxtakor Stadium; Attendance: 856; Referee: Xushnud Suyunboyev

May 18, 2026 2	Surxon	2–0	Paxtakor	Toshkent
19:00 (UTC+5)	Abdullajonov 20'; Chinedu 74' (pen.)	Report		Stadium: Pakhtakor Markaziy Stadium; Attendance: 565; Referee: Ravshan Abduvohidov

May 18, 2026 2	Yaypan	1–0	Kattaqoʻrgʻon	Yaypan
18:00 (UTC+5)	Moʻminov 73'	Report		Stadium: Uzbekistan; Attendance: 832; Referee: Umidjon Rahimjonov

April 27, 2026 3	Paxtakor	3–0	Kattaqoʻrgʻon	Toshkent
19:00 (UTC+5)	Turdimurodov 14', 73'; Ibrohimov 76'	Report		Stadium: Paxtakor Stadium; Attendance: 658; Referee: Shavkat Nasibullayev

April 27, 2026 3	Yaypan	1–2	Surxon	Yaypan
19:00 (UTC+5)	Gʻayratillayev 87'	Report	Abduhamidov 63'; Chinedu 81'	Stadium: Uzbekistan; Attendance: 550; Referee: Temurbek Toʻxtasinov

=== H group ===
Pos	Team	Pld	W	D	L	GF	GA	GD	Pts	Qualification
1	Andijon	3	2	1	0	12	3	+9	7	Qualifying for the play-offs
2	Nasaf	3	2	1	0	11	2	+9	7	Qualifying for the play-offs
3	Shoʻrtan	3	1	0	2	5	8	−3	3	
4	Havokand	3	0	0	3	3	18	−15	0	

Updated to match(es) played on Toʻliq. Source: UzPFL
Rules for classification: Group stage tiebreakers

May 15, 2026 1	Shoʻrtan	1–3	Andijon	Gʻuzor
19:00 (UTC+5)	Asomiddinov 52'	Report	Xoldorxonov 39'; Abdumajidov 72'; Toirov 84'	Stadium: G'uzor Stadium; Attendance: 1270; Referee: Rinat Serazitdinov

May 16, 2026 1	Nasaf	6–1	Havokand	Qarshi
17:00 (UTC+5)	Abdurahmatov 2', 15'; Muhiddinov 23'; Abduholiqov 24', 84'; Otubanjo 40'	Report	Musayev 90+1'	Stadium: Markaziy Stadium; Attendance: 7625; Referee: Alisher Rahimqulov

April 21, 2026 2	Andijon	1–1	Nasaf	Andijon
19:00 (UTC+5)	Boakye 25'	Report	Abduholiqov 56'	Stadium: Bobur Arena; Attendance: 11172; Referee: Gʻayrat Joʻrayev

April 21, 2026 2	Havokand	1–4	Shoʻrtan	Yaypan
18:30 (UTC+5)	Toshtemirov 90+2'	Report	Jumayev 40'; Nasriddinov 77'; Olawale 79'; Asomiddinov 85'	Stadium: Uzbekistan; Attendance: 310; Referee: Xushnud Suyunboyev

April 26, 2026 3	Nasaf	4–0	Shoʻrtan	Qarshi
18:00 (UTC+5)	Eshboʻtayev 15' (o.g.); Muhiddinov 48'; Xudoyberdiyev 80' (o.g.); Abduholiqov 90+1'	Report		Stadium: Markaziy Stadium; Attendance: 4,375; Referee: Nayim Qosimov

April 26, 2026 3	Havokand	1–8	Andijon	Kokand
18:00 (UTC+5)	Ahmadjonov 45+2'	Report	Ismonaliyev 7'; Sulaymonov 13'; Turgʻunboyev 20', 32'; Xoldorxonov 23', 72', 90+3'; Karimov 74'	Stadium: Kokand „Markaziy“ Stadium; Attendance: 320; Referee: Umidjon Rahimjonov

== Play-off ==
=== Draw ===
The draw for the quarter-finals of the 2026 Uzbekistan Cup was held on June 2.

=== Bracket ===
Quarter-final
Neftchi	2
Lokomotiv	4
Soʻgʻdiyona	1
Andijon	2
OKMK	2
Guliston	0
Navbahor	3
Gʻazalkent	1

Semi-final
Lokomotiv
Andijon
OKMK
Navbahor

Final

=== Eighth-finals ===
August 29, 2026
18:00 (UTC+5)

Surxon	0–1	Guliston
	Report	52' Umurzoqov

OKMK Stadium, Olmaliq
Attendance: 548
Referee: Umidjon Rahimjonov

August 29, 2026
19:00 (UTC+5)

Neftchi	1–0	Paxtakor
Perica 81'	Report

Istiqlol Stadium, Fargʻona
Attendance: 18777
Referee: Shavkat Nasibullayev

August 30, 2026
18:00 (UTC+5)

Soʻgʻdiyona	2–0	Jayxun
	Report

Zaamin Stadium, Zomin
Attendance: 507
Referee: Nayim Qosimov

August 30, 2026
19:00 (UTC+5)

Navbahor	1–0	Nasaf
	Report

Markaziy Stadium (Namangan), Namangan
Attendance: 18253
Referee: Temurbek Toʻxtasinov

September 15, 2026
19:00 (UTC+5)

Andijon	2–2	Olimpik MobiUz
	Report

Bobur Arena, Andijon
Attendance: 5747
Referee: Alisher Rahimqulov

September 15, 2026
18:30 (UTC+5)

Bunyodkor	0–1	Lokomotiv
	Report

Lokomotiv Stadium, Toshkent
Attendance: 1453
Referee: Rinat Serazitdinov

September 16, 2026
18:30 (UTC+5)

OKMK	2–1	Xorazm
	Report

OKMK Stadium, Olmaliq
Attendance: 1002
Referee: Umidjon Rahimjonov

September 16, 2026
(UTC+5)

Gʻazalkent	2–1	Kokand 1912
	Report

JAR Stadium, Tashkent
Attendance: 1625
Referee: Xushnud Suyunboyev

=== Quarter-finals ===
October 20, 2026
(UTC+5)

Neftchi	2–4	Lokomotiv
	Report

October 20, 2026
(UTC+5)

Soʻgʻdiyona	1–2	Andijon
	Report

October 20, 2026
(UTC+5)

OKMK	2–0	Guliston
	Report

October 21, 2026
(UTC+5)

Navbahor	3–1	Gʻazalkent
	Report

=== Semi-finals ===
(UTC+5)

–

(UTC+5)

–
