= 2026 Uzbekistan Pro League =

Uzbekistan Pro League
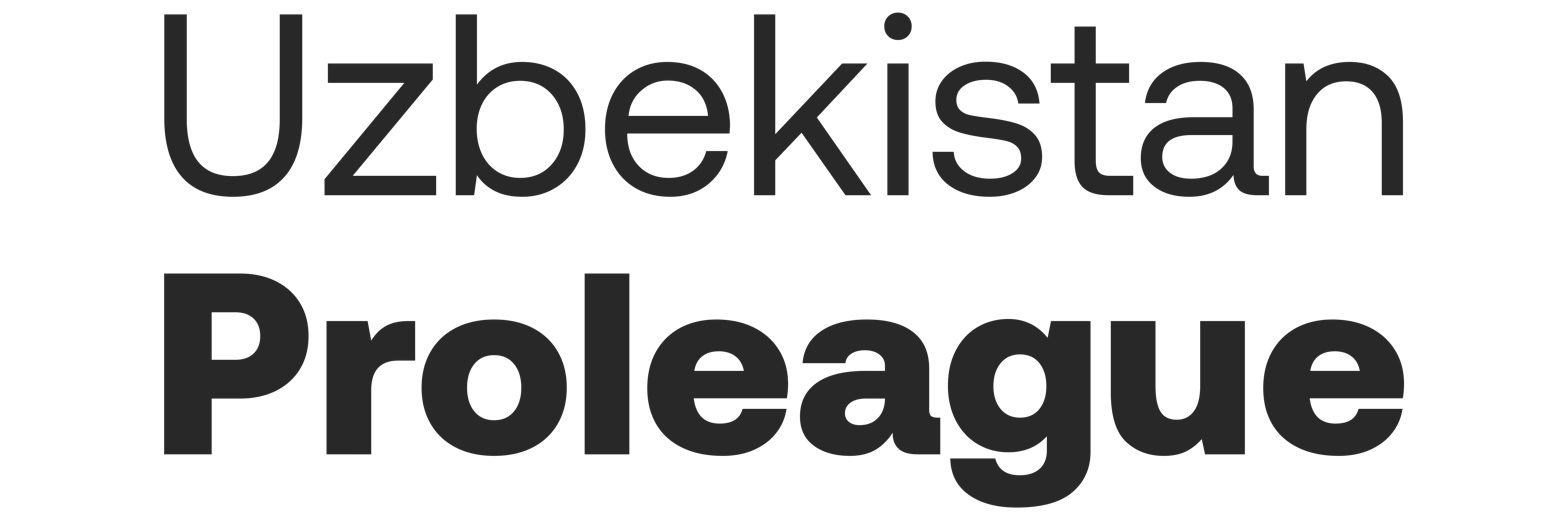
- Season: 5 April - 11 November 2026
- Champions: PFK Aral
- Matches: 182
- Top goalscorer: Ruslan Qalmagʻanbetov

2026 Uzbekistan Pro League(Uzbek: Футбол бўйича 2026-йилги Ўзбекистон Про лигаси), also known as Pro Liga Yandex Plus due to sponsorship reasons, is the 35th since its establishment in 1992.

The draw for the tournament, in which 6 teams take part, took place on March 11.

== Background ==
2026 participation of 14 teams from the season in Uzbekistan Pro League in approved. Compared to last season, the league increased the circle of the team that has separated 4/2, type 20 is held without.

Lokomotiv are promoted to the 2026 Uzbekistan Super League.

In the 2025 season the club, which finished 6th in the Uzbek Pro League - Olympic was relegated to the lower division - First League.

== Teams ==
Team venues in 2026 Uzbekistan Pro League

=== Round Staff and sponsors ===
Club	Coach	Location	Stadium	Kit sponsor	Shirt sponsor
Aral	(Uzbekistan) Vadim Shodimatov	Nukus	NOPSTTM		Kelme
BuxDU	(Uzbekistan)	Bukhara		Bukhara State University	
Gazalkent	(Uzbekistan) Zaynitdin Tadjiyev	Gazalkent	Gazalkent stadium	Gazalkent District Administration	
Lochin	(Uzbekistan) Eldor Moyliev	Qarshi	Geolog Stadium	Qarshi State University	
Jaykhun	(Uzbekistan) Aybek Nurbaev	Nukus	Karakalpakstan CYFA Academy	Karakalpak Government	
Olimpic MobiUz	(Uzbekistan) Farhod Nishonov	Tashkent	JAR Stadium	MobiUz	
FarDU	(Uzbekistan) Shavkat Yusupov	Fergana	FarDU Stadium	Fergana State University	
Kattakurgan	(Uzbekistan) Yorqin Nazarov	Kattakurgan	Dinamo Stadium	Kakkakurgan Administration	
Metallurg	(Uzbekistan) Ilkhom Muminjonov	Bekabad	Metallurg Stadium	Uzbekistan Metallurgy Combinat	
Pakhtakor Farm	(Uzbekistan) Bobur Abdurahmonov	Tashkent	Pakhtakor	Akfa Group	
Republic FA	(Uzbekistan) Jamoliddin Rahmatullayev	Tashkent	UFA National Football Center		
Shurtan	(Uzbekistan) Asror Aliqulov	Guzar	Shurtan Stadium	Shurtan Gas Field	
TerDU	(Uzbekistan) Eldor Boymatov	Termez	Termez State University		
Yaypan	(Uzbekistan) Rashid Gafurov	Yaypan	Uzbekistan Stadium	Fergana Regional Administration	

=== Round Coach substitutions ===
Club	Old coach	Reason	Date	Table position	New coach	Appointed

== Foreign players ==
The number of foreign players is restricted to five per UPL team. A team can use only five foreign players on the field in each game.

Club	Player 1	Player 2	Player 3	Player 4	Player 5	Player 6	Former players
Aral Nukus	(Russia) Mark Krasnov	(Turkmenistan) **Wepa Jumaýew**					
BukhDU							
FarDU							
Gazalkent	(Russia) Vladislav Nabatov	(Russia) Ivan Korshunov	(Russia) Timofey Postnikov	(Ukraine) Ivan Pidtyinnyi			
Jaykhun							
Kattakurgan	(Croatia) Filip Dangubić	(Ghana) Francis Narh	(North Macedonia) Milosh Tosheski	(Russia) Vadim Lukyanov	(Russia) Igor Kozlov	(Serbia) Ensar Brunčević	(Brazil) Isac Martins Silva (Georgia (country)) Giorgi Pantsulaia (Slovenia) Almin Kurtović
Lochin							
Metallurg	(Brazil) Maxuel Cássio	(Montenegro) Armin Bosnjak	(Montenegro) Marko Milickovic	(Serbia) Branimir Jočić	(Serbia) Vladimir Bubanja		
Olimpik-Mobiuz							
Pakhtakor Farm	(Turkmenistan) Arslan Wepaýew						
Republic FA							
Shurtan Guzar	(Belarus) **Roman Vegerya**	(Georgia (country)) Beka Kharshiladze	(Georgia (country)) Levan Barabadze	(Ivory Coast) Muhamed Olawale	(Russia) Yuriy Klochkov		
TerDU							
Yaypan							

In bold: Players that have been capped for their national team.

== League table ==
Pos	Team	Pld	W	D	L	GF	GA	GD	Pts	Qualification or relegation
1	Aral Nukus (P)	24	18	4	2	49	15	+34	58	Promotion to Uzbekistan Super League
2	Shurtan	24	15	4	5	41	23	+18	49	Qualification for Super League play-off
3	Metallurg Bekabad	24	14	6	4	53	19	+34	48	Qualification for Super League play-off
4	FarDU	25	13	7	5	44	34	+10	46	Qualification for Super League play-off
5	Kattakurgan	25	13	4	8	36	26	+10	43	Qualification for Super League play-off
6	FC Olympic MobiUz	24	12	6	6	48	29	+19	42	
7	Gazalkent	24	12	6	6	45	29	+16	42	
8	Lochin	24	11	6	7	39	32	+7	39	
9	Respublika	24	8	6	10	34	36	−2	30	
10	Jaykhun	24	7	4	13	26	34	−8	25	
11	Yaypan	24	7	4	13	28	45	−17	25	
12	Buxoro University	24	5	1	18	25	56	−31	16	
13	Pakhtakor II	24	4	1	19	18	54	−36	13	Relegation to Uzbekistan First League
14	TerDU (R)	26	1	1	24	12	66	−54	4	Relegation to Uzbekistan First League

Updated to match(es) played on 29 October 2026. Source: Tribuna.com and FootyStats
Rules for classification: 1) points; 2) head-to-head points; 3) head-to-head goal difference; 4) head-to-head away goals scored; 5) goal difference; 6) number of goals scored.
(P) Promoted; (R) Relegated

== See also ==
- 2026 Uzbekistan Super League
- 2026 Uzbekistan Cup
