= 2026 Uzbekistan Super Cup =

- Event: Uzbekistan Super Cup
Neftchi	Pakhtakor
(Uzbekistan)	(Uzbekistan)
1	0
- Date: 19:00, March 15, 2026
- Venue: Bobur Arena, Andijan
- Man of the Match: Ibrokhimkhalil Yuldoshev
- Referee: Timur Tukhtasinov
- Attendance: 16,821
- Weather: Cloudy; 7 °C (45 °F); 86% humidity

2026 Uzbekistan Super Cup (Uzbek: Футбол бўйича 2026-йилги Ўзбекистон Суперкубоги) was the 11th edition of Uzbekistan Super Cup, an annual football match contested between the winners of the previous Super League and Cup season's. It was played between the 2025 Uzbekistan Cup winner – Pakhtakor and the 2025 Uzbekistan Super League champion – Neftchi. Neftchi played in the Super Cup for the first time in its history and won the trophy. Pakhtakor participated in the Super Cup for the seventh time in its history and won in previous seasons twice.

== Host and officials ==
On 29 January, 2026 it was decided that 2026 Uzbekistan Super Cup will be held in Bobur Arena.

== Match details ==
Neftchi
Players
35	(Uzbekistan) Botirali Ergashev
4	(Serbia) Bojan Ciger
6	(Uzbekistan) Ibrokhimkhalil Yuldoshev
7	(Uzbekistan) Abror Ismoilov	(substituted off) 81'
10	(Uzbekistan) Jamshid Iskanderov	(substituted off) 72'
18	(Croatia) Stipe Perica	(substituted off) 61'
20	(Uzbekistan) Anvar Gafurov	(yellow card) 82'
22	(Uzbekistan) Alisher Odilov	(substituted off) 81'
23	(Serbia) Jovan Đokić
34	(Uzbekistan) Farrukh Sayfiev
77	(Brazil) Jurani Ferreira	17'	(yellow card) 67'	(substituted off) 72'
Subs:
2	(Uzbekistan) Izzatillo Poʻlatov
5	(Uzbekistan) Ikromjon Alibaev	(substituted on) 72'
8	(Montenegro) Vladimir Jovović	(substituted on) 72'
9	(Uzbekistan) Khurshid Giyosov	(substituted on) 81'
11	(Uzbekistan) Asilbek Jumayev	(substituted on) 81'
21	(Uzbekistan) Muhsinjon Ubaydullayev
30	(Uzbekistan) Rustambek Fomin
32	(Serbia) Zoran Marušić	(substituted on) 61'
45	(Uzbekistan) Akbar Turaev
Coach:
(Uzbekistan) Islom Ismoilov

Pakhtakor
	Players
12	(Uzbekistan) Vladimir Nazarov
4	(Iraq) Zaid Tahseen
7	(Uzbekistan) Khojiakbar Alijonov
9	(Uzbekistan) Ibrokhim Ibrokhimov	(substituted off) 79'
10	(Uzbekistan) Akmal Mozgovoy
14	(Uzbekistan) Rustam Turdimurodov	(substituted off) 61'
17	(Uzbekistan) Dostonbek Khamdamov	(substituted off) 69'
21	(Iraq) Bashar Resan	(substituted off) 69'
27	(Uzbekistan) Sardor Sabirkhodjaev
34	(Uzbekistan) Sherzod Nasrullaev
55	(Uzbekistan) Muhammadrasul Abdumajidov
Subs:
3	(Uzbekistan) Shakhzod Azmiddinov
5	(Uzbekistan) Mukhammadkodir Khamraliev
8	(Uzbekistan) Dilshod Saitov	(substituted on) 73'
11	(Uzbekistan) Khojimat Erkinov	(substituted on) 69'
19	(Poland) Piotr Parzyszek	(substituted on) 61'
23	(Uzbekistan) Abdurauf Buriev
35	(Uzbekistan) Sanjar Kuvvatov
50	(Brazil) Flamarion	(substituted on) 79'
77	(Uzbekistan) Oybek Bozorov
(substituted on) 69'
Coach:
(Uzbekistan) Kamoliddin Tajiev

March 15, 2026
19:00 UZT (UTC+5)

Neftchi	1—0	Pakhtakor
Ferreira 17'	Match report

Bobur Arena, Andijan
Attendance: 16,821
Referee: Timur Tukhtasinov (Uzbekistan)

Assistant referees:
Anvar Marajabov
Ziyodullo Abdurakhmonov
Fourth official:
Gayrat Juraev
Video assistant referee:
Abdurashid Khudoyberganov
Assistant VAR:
Akobirkhoja Shukurullaev
Match commissioner
Shokhrukh Said
Match rules

- 90 minutes.
- If scores are level, no extra time will be played; a penalty shoot-out will determine the winner.
- Seven substitutes.
- A maximum of five substitutions allowed.
