= Federico Botti =

Italian footballer

Personal information
- Full name: Federico Botti
- Date of birth: 20 June 2002 (age 24)
- Place of birth: Desenzano del Garda, Italy
- Height: 1.81 m (5 ft 11 in)
- Position: Goalkeeper

Team information
- Current team: Bunyodkor
- Number: 16

Youth career
- 2019: Brescia
- 2020: USD Breno

Senior career*
Years	Team	Apps	(Gls)
2019–2021	Brescia	0	(0)
2019–2020	→ USD Breno (loan)	12	(0)
2020–2021	→ Arconatese (loan)	34	(0)
2021	→ Siena (loan)	0	(0)
2021–2022	Ravenna	34	(0)
2022–2023	Pro Sesto 1913	17	(0)
2023–2024	Arzignano	10	(0)
2024–2025	Mantova	0	(0)
2026–	Bunyodkor	8	(0)
- * Club domestic league appearances and goals as of 29 July 2026

Federico Botti (born 20 June 2002) is an Italian footballer who plays as a goalkeeper for Uzbekistan Super League club Bunyodkor.

== Career ==
Federico is a Brescia youth player. He did not play for the Brescia first team and spent time on loan at several Italian clubs between 2019 and 2021. He was on loan at Arzignano and Mantova between 2024 and 2025, but did not make a first-team appearance.

On 12 January 2026, he signed a one year contract with the Uzbekistan Super League club Bunyodkor.

== Career statistics ==
As of 14 April 2026

Club	Season	League			Cup		Continental		Total	
Club	Season	Division	Apps	Goals	Apps	Goals	Apps	Goals	Apps	Goals
Bunyodkor	2026	Uzbekistan Super League	4	0	0	0	–		4	0
Career total			4	0	0	0	–		4	0
