= Akmal Rustamov =

Uzbek football manager

Personal information
- Date of birth: 8 December 1986 (age 39)
- Place of birth: Tashkent, Uzbekistan
- Height: 1.84 m (6 ft 0 in)
- Position: Defender

Team information
- Current team: Qizilqum (interim head coach)

Senior career*
Years	Team	Apps	(Gls)
2003-2005	Qizilqum	1	(0)
2006	Bukhara	16	(0)
2007–2012	Qizilqum	72	(1)
2012	Bukhara	10	(0)
2013	Olmaliq	9	(0)
2013–2019	Qizilqum	122	(5)
Total		230	(6)

Managerial career
- 2025–: Qizilqum (interim)
- * Club domestic league appearances and goals

Akmal Rustamov (born 8 December 1986) is an Uzbek former professional association football defender. He previously played for Qizilqum and currently serves as the club's interim head coach.

== Playing career ==
Rustamov played as a defender. He spent the majority of his career at Qizilqum. Also represented Bukhara, Sogdiana, and Shurtan during his career.

== Coaching career ==
In June 2025, following the resignation of Nikola Lazarevic, Rustamov took charge of Qizilqum as interim head coach. Under his management, the team reached 36 points in 2025 Uzbekistan Super League season and finished in 9th place. Due to his positive results, the club extended his contract until the end of the 2026 season.
