= Stanislav Kudryashov =

Uzbek football manager

Personal information
- Full name: Stanislav Petrovich Kudryashov
- Date of birth: 20 August 1975 (age 51)
- Place of birth: Tashkent, Uzbek SSR
- Height: 1.79 m (5 ft 10 in)
- Position: Midfielder

Senior career*
| Years | Team | Apps | (Gls) |
| 1992–1999 | Traktor Tashkent | 175 | (16) |
| 2000–2003 | Neftchi Fergana | 69 | (1) |
| 2003 | Sementchi Quvasoy | 8 | (0) |
| 2004 | Sogdiana Jizzakh | 14 | (0) |
| 2005 | Navbahor Namangan | 8 | (0) |

Managerial career
- 2024–2025: Surkhon (assistant)
- 2026–: Surkhon
- * Club domestic league appearances and goals

Stanislav Kudryashov (Russian: Станислав Кудряшов; born 20 August 1975) is an Uzbek professional association football player and football coach. He is the head coach of Surkhon.

== Football career ==
=== Playing career ===
Kudryashov began his professional career in 1992 with Traktor Tashkent, the team of Tashkent Tractor Plant. He spent eight seasons with the club, making 175 appearances and scoring 16 goals.

In the 2000 season, he transferred to Neftchi Fergana. During the 2001 season, he won his first Uzbekistan Super League title. That same season, he played in the final of Uzbekistan Cup for the first time. In the 2000-01 Uzbekistan Cup final, Neftchi lost 2–1 to Pakhtakor Tashkent. Kudryashov played from the start of the match until the 70th minute, when he was substituted for Timur Kapadze.

Later in his career, his form declined and in 2003 he played for Sementchi Quvasoy. In 2004, he had a short spell with Sogdiana Jizzakh, and in 2005 he played for Navbahor Namangan. After 2005, he rarely appeared for professional teams.

=== Coaching career ===
After retiring as a player, Kudryashov worked within the system of Pakhtakor Tashkent, coaching several youth teams. He also worked as a coach for Pakhtakor-2.

On 8 January 2026, he was appointed head coach of Surkhon.

== Honours ==
- Uzbekistan Super League winner: 2001
- Uzbekistan Cup runner-up: 2001, 2002
