= Sergey Tokov =

Uzbek football manager

Personal information
- Full name: Sergey Sultanovich Tokov
- Date of birth: 1 September 1981 (age 45)
- Place of birth: Tashkent, Uzbek SSR
- Height: 1.79 m (5 ft 10 in)
- Position: Defender

Team information
- Current team: Xorazm (head coach)

Senior career*
| Years | Team | Apps | (Gls) |
| 2000-2001 | Traktor Tashkent | 10 | (0) |
| 2005 | Navbahor Namangan | 2 | (0) |
| 2006 | Dinamo Samarqand | 13 | (2) |
| 2006 | Navbahor Namangan | 14 | (1) |
| 2007 | Dinamo Samarqand | 27 | (0) |
| 2008 | AGMK | 17 | (0) |
| 2009 | Dinamo Samarqand | 8 | (0) |
| 2009-2010 | FC Pune | 12 | (0) |
| 2010 | SC United | | |
| 2011 | Sogdiana Jizzakh | | (0) |

Managerial career
- 2013-2015: Oqtepa (assistant)
- 2016-2018: Pakhtakor Tashkent Academy
- 2019-2021: Oqtepa
- 2023-2024: Surkhon Termez (assistant)
- 2025: Oqtepa (assistant)
- 2026-: Xorazm
- * Club domestic league appearances and goals

Sergey Sultonovich Tokov (Russian: Сергей Султанович Токов; born 1 September 1981) is an Uzbek former professional association football player. He is currently the head coach of Xorazm.

== Playing career ==
Tokov played as a defender. He began his professional career with Traktor Tashkent in 2000. During his career, he represented several Uzbek clubs, including Navbahor Namangan, Dinamo Samarqand, AGMK, and Sogdiana Jizzakh. Between 2009 and 2010, he played abroad for Indian clubs Pune FC and United SC.

== Coaching career ==
Tokov began his coaching career as an assistant coach at NBU-Osiyo. In the 2013 season, he signed with Oqtepa as assistant coach to his brother, Aleksandr Tokov. He worked at Oqtepa until the end of the 2021 season. From 2016 to 2018, he served as a senior coach at the Pakhtakor Tashkent Academy, winning several local youth tournaments. At the beginning of the 2023 season, he worked with FC Surkhon in the Uzbekistan Super League. On 24 January 2026, he was appointed head coach of Xorazm.
