= Zaamin =

Zaamin or Zomin may refer to:

- Zaamin National Park, a nature preserve in Uzbekistan
- Zomin District, a district in Jizzakh Region in Uzbekistan
- Zomin, a town in Uzbekistan that serves as the county seat for the Zomin District
- FK Zaamin, an association football club based in the town
