= Elzio Lohan =

Brazilian footballer

Personal information
- Full name: Elzio Lohan Alves Lucio
- Date of birth: 19 March 2001 (age 25)
- Place of birth: Recife, Brazil
- Height: 1.75 m (5 ft 9 in)
- Position: Midfielder

Team information
- Current team: Khorazm
- Number: 13

Youth career
- 2020: Ituano

Senior career*
Years	Team	Apps	(Gls)
2021–2022	Ituano	1	(0)
2021	→ Cascavel (loan)	0	(0)
2022	Bahia	9	(0)
2022–2023	Zmaj Makarska	26	(2)
2023–2024	Velež Mostar	5	(0)
2024	→ Velež Nevesinje (loan)	15	(0)
2025	Enosis Paralimni	10	(0)
2026–	Khorazm	4	(0)
- * Club domestic league appearances and goals as of 19 March 2026

Elzio Lohan Alves Lucio (born 19 March 2001), known as Elzio Lohan is a Brazilian footballer who plays as a Midfielder for Uzbekistan Super League club Khorazm.

== Career ==
On 13 January 2025, he signed a two year contract with the Uzbekistan Super League club Khorazm.

== Career statistics ==
As of 10 February 2026

Club	Season	League			Cup		Continental		Total	
Club	Season	Division	Apps	Goals	Apps	Goals	Apps	Goals	Apps	Goals
Khorazm	2026	Uzbekistan Super League	0	0	0	0	–		0	0
Career total			0	0	0	0	–		0	0
