= Shurtan Stadium =

Stadium in Guzar, Uzbekistan

Coordinates: 38°37′05″N 66°15′33″E

- Interactive map of Shurtan Stadium
- Location: Guzar, Qashqadaryo province
- Capacity: 8,000 (football)
- Surface: grass

Tenant
- FC Shurtan Guzar

Shurtan Stadium, also known as Sho'rtan Stadion, is the official home of FC Shurtan Guzar.
