= Santiago García =

Santiago García may refer to:

- Santiago García (fencer) (1899–?), Spanish fencer
- Santiago García (Argentine footballer) (born 1988), Argentine football left-back for Alianza Lima
- Santiago García (Uruguayan footballer) (1990–2021), Uruguayan football striker
- Santi García (born 2001), Spanish football midfielder for Getafe
