= FC Gazalkent =

FC Gʻazalkent
- Full name: Gʻazalkent Futbol Klubi
- Short name: Gʻazalkent
- Founded: 1993
- Ground: Gʻazalkent Central Stadium
- Manager: (Uzbekistan) Zayniddin Tadjiyev
- League: Uzbekistan Pro League

FC Gazalkent (Uzbek: Gʻazalkent futbol klubi / Ғазалкент футбол клуби) is an Uzbekistani football club based in Gʻazalkent, Tashkent Region. The club competes in Uzbekistan Pro League, the second tier of Uzbek football.

== History ==
FC Gazalkent was founded in 1993 with the mission to promote football excellence in Tashkent Region and cultivate young football talent. Over the years, the club has participated in regional competitions, Uzbekistan Cup and national league structure, gradually establishing itself within the Uzbek football pyramid. In the 2026 season, FC Gazalkent competes in Uzbekistan Pro League.

== Current squad ==
As of October 2026

Note: Flags indicate national team as defined under FIFA eligibility rules; some limited exceptions apply. Players may hold more than one non-FIFA nationality.

No.	Pos.	Nation	Player
1	GK	UZB	Asilbek Atashov
3	DF	UZB	Ozodbek Ibodullayev
4	DF	UZB	Khodjiakbar Yusufboev
5	MF	UZB	Saddam Akhmadov
6	MF	UZB	Abduvakil Khikmatullaev
8	MF	UZB	Adam Prisyazhnyuk
9	FW	UZB	Vladislav Nabatov
11	FW	UZB	Mukhammadyusuf Fayzullaev
14	MF	UZB	Sukhrob Sadirdjanov
15	DF	UZB	David Belyavskiy
16	FW	UZB	Abdurakhmon Abdullaev

No.	Pos.	Nation	Player
17	FW	UZB	Diyorbek Tadjiev
18	GK	UZB	Asror Kenzhaev
21	DF	UZB	Muhammadyusuf Mirkodirov
22	DF	UZB	Kodirbek Mamasov
23	FW	UZB	Rustam Aliev
27	DF	UZB	Behruz Jamoliddinov
68	FW	UZB	Ivan Korshunov
71	MF	UZB	Lazizbek Mirzaev
77	DF	UZB	Umidjon Turgunov
88	FW	UZB	Ruzimurod Ruzimurodov

== Non-playing staff ==
As of 2026

Head coach: (Uzbekistan) Zayniddin Tadjiyev
