= Lochin Qarshi =

Uzbek football club

Lochin
- Full name: "Lochin" Football Club under Qarshi State University
- Coach: Eldor Moyliyev
- League: First League; Uzbekistan Cup

Lochin (translate as Falcon) is a football club of Qarshi State University based in Qarshi, Uzbekistan. In April 2025, the club was admitted to Uzbekistan First League. This allowed the team, which was formed under the university, to participate in professional football competitions.
