= Surkhon Arena =

Stadium in Termez, Uzbekistan

Coordinates: 37.2411°N 67.3043°E

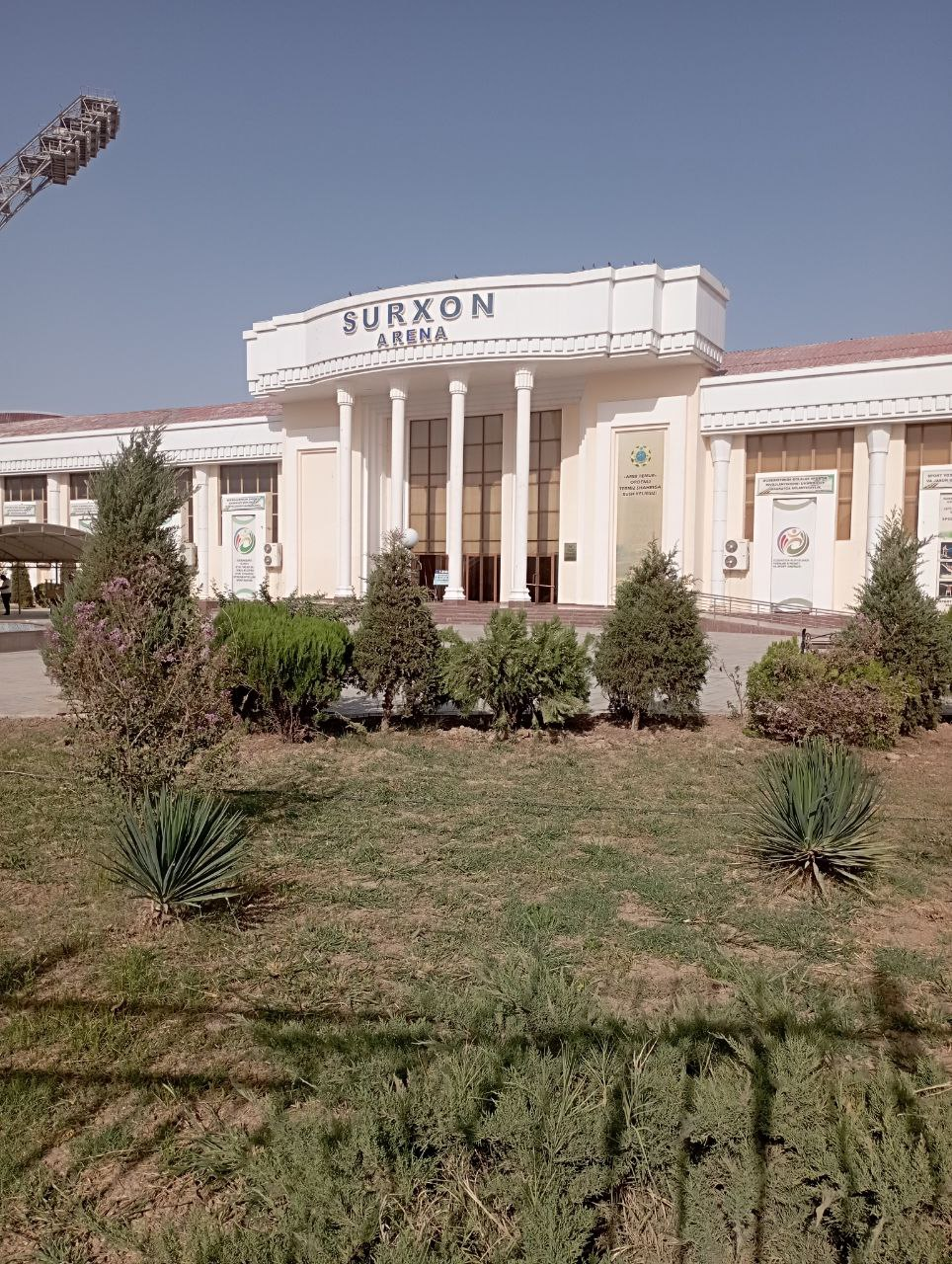
- Interactive map of Surkhon Arena
- Location: Termez, Uzbekistan
- Owner: Surkhon; TerDU
- Operator: Uzbekistan Football Association
- Capacity: 10,599
- Surface: natural turf, grass
- Field size: 112m x 72m

Construction
- Renovated: 2019, 2021—2025

Tenants
- Surkhon, Uzbekistan national football team

Surkhon Sports Complex, also known as Surkhon Arena, is a football field located in Termez, Uzbekistan.

The stadium can accommodate 10,000 spectators. Between 2019 and 2022, renovations were carried out at the stadium. After FC Surkhon began to receive financing from the Eriell company in 2023, the Surkhon arena is also undergoing a complete renovation. The partial renovation and reconstruction of the stadium is estimated at $1,500,000.
