= 7SABER =

Uzbek sportswear brand

- Type: MChJ
- Founded: June 21, 2021; 5 years ago
- Headquarters: Tashkent, Uzbekistan
- Products: Sportswear
- Owner: Oraz Abdurazakov
- Website: 7saber.uz

7SABER or Seven Saber is an Uzbek sportswear brand. It was launched in Tashkent on 29 June 2021. It was founded by Otabek Umarov, then chairman of the Uzbek Triathlon Federation, and public figure Oraz Abdurazakov. Initially created as a graphic symbol representing various sports, it later evolved into a company producing sportswear, casual wear, and energy drinks.

In August 2025, the Uzbekistan Football Association announced that the men's national team would switch to kits supplied by 7Saber. The change follows Uzbekistan’s first-ever qualification for the 2026 FIFA World Cup and ends the team’s kit partnership with the German manufacturer Jako, which had been in place since 2019.
