= Vanja Ilić =

Vanja Ilić may refer to:

- Vanja Ilić (handballer) (born 1993), Serbian handball player
- Vanja Ilić (swimmer) (1927–2018), Yugoslav swimmer
