= Oybek Bozorov =

Uzbekistani footballer

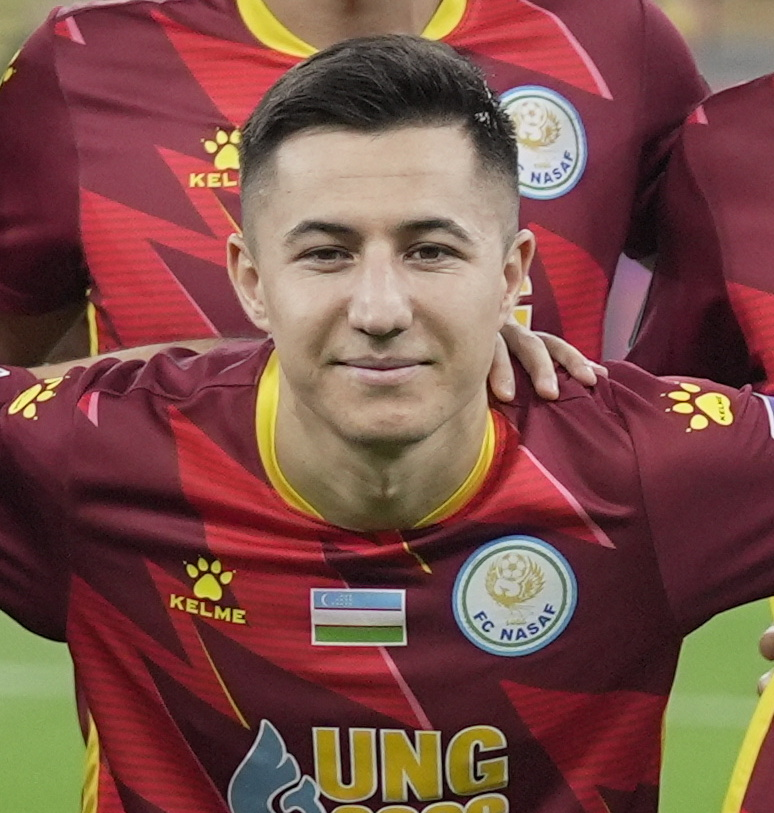

Personal information
- Full name: Oybek Olim o'g'li Bozorov
- Date of birth: 7 August 1997 (age 29)
- Place of birth: Koson, Uzbekistan
- Height: 1.67 m (5 ft 6 in)
- Position: Forward

Team information
- Current team: Pakhtakor
- Number: 77

Senior career*
Years	Team	Apps	(Gls)
2018–2025	Nasaf	165	(23)
2026–	Pakhtakor	10	(0)

International career^{‡}
2019–2020	Uzbekistan U-23	9	(3)
2020–	Uzbekistan	16	(0)
- * Club domestic league appearances and goals as of 28 July 2026 ‡ National team caps and goals as of 00:00, 15 June 2021 (UTC)

Oybek Bozorov (Uzbek Cyrillic: Ойбек Бозоров; born 7 August 1997) is an Uzbekistani footballer who plays as a forward for Pakhtakor.

== Career ==
=== International ===
He made his debut for main team, Uzbekistan on 23 February 2020 in a friendly match against Belarus.

Uzbekistan national team
Year	Apps	Goals
2020	1	0
Total	1	0

Statistics accurate as of match played 23 February 2020.
