= FC TerDU =

TerDU
- Full name: Termez State University Football Club
- Nickname: The Students
- Founded: 2024
- Owner: Termez State University
- Chairman: Abdukodir Toshkulov
- Coach: Eldor Boymatov
- League: Uzbekistan Pro League
- Website: tersu.uz

TerDU is the football club of Termez State University.

== History ==
The club was founded in 2024 under the sponsorship of Termez State University, based on the foundation of Qiziriq football club. In 2025, the team competed in Uzbekistan First League. During preparations for the 2026 season, the club managed to defeat the Kokand 1912 club, a representative of Uzbekistan Super League, in a friendly match. From 2026, the team has been participating in the Uzbekistan Pro League (the second division in Uzbek football league system). The club plays its home matches at Surkhon Arena.
