= Sanjar Kuvvatov =

Uzbekistani footballer (born 1990)

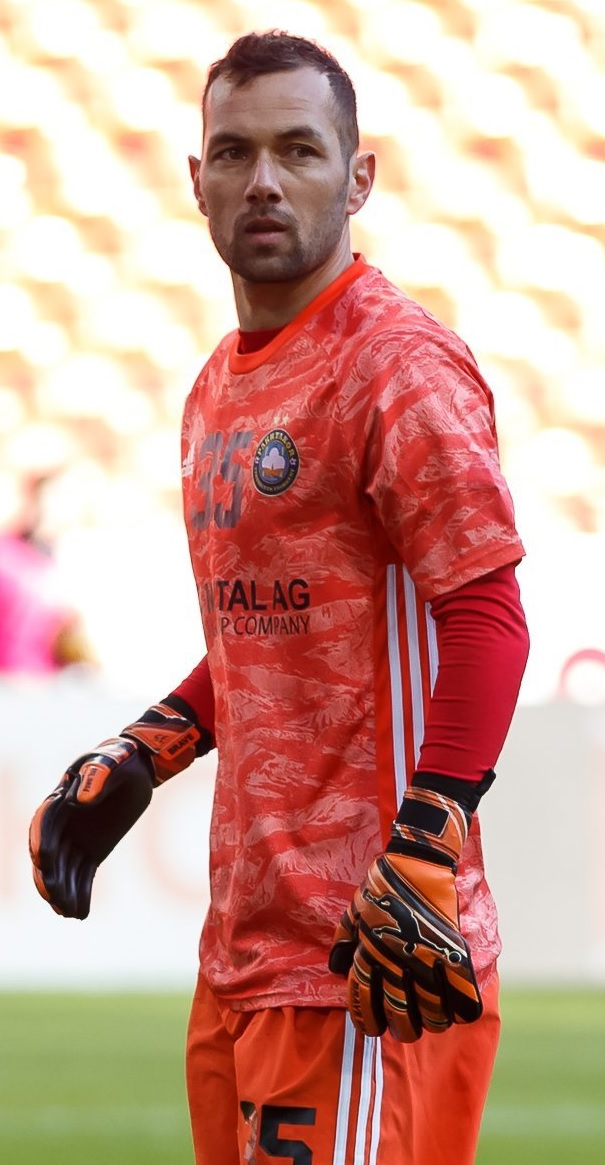
- Kuvvatov with Pakhtakor in 2020

Personal information
- Full name: Sanjar Kuvvatov
- Date of birth: 8 January 1990 (age 36)
- Place of birth: Kasbi, Kashkadarya, Uzbek SSR, Soviet Union
- Height: 1.80 m (5 ft 11 in)
- Position: Goalkeeper

Team information
- Current team: Pakhtakor
- Number: 1

Senior career*
Years	Team	Apps	(Gls)
2008–2016	Mash'al Mubarek	75	(0)
2016–2019	Nasaf	61	(0)
2019–2023	Pakhtakor	72	(0)
2024	Neftchi Fergana	7	(0)
2024	Navbahor	7	(0)
2025	Qizilqum	28	(0)
2026–	Pakhtakor	9	(0)

International career^{‡}
2019–	Uzbekistan	7	(0)
- * Club domestic league appearances and goals as of 28 July 2026 ‡ National team caps and goals as of 27 December 2023

Sanjar Kuvvatov (Uzbek Cyrillic: Санжар Қувватов, Uzbek: Sanjar Quvvatov; born 8 January 1990) is an Uzbek professional footballer who plays as a goalkeeper for Pakhtakor. He's played for Uzbekistan at several youth levels, including the under-20 and under-21 side.

He played all three of Uzbekistan's games in the 2009 FIFA U-20 World Cup in Egypt conceding six goals. Despite finishing third in Group D, the one point gained wasn't enough for Uzbekistan to advance to the knock-out rounds. Kuvvatov played against England under-21s on 10 August 2010 at Ashton Gate. Despite England having nearly all of the possession and taking an abundance of shots, the score was kept down to just 2–0, primarily because of Kuvvatov's shot-stopping.
