= Jurani Ferreira =

Brazilian footballer

Ratinho
Personal information
- Full name: Jurani Francisco Ferreira
- Date of birth: 1 October 1996 (age 30)
- Place of birth: Cavalcante, Brazil
- Height: 1.75 m (5 ft 9 in)
- Position: Midfielder

Team information
- Current team: Neftchi Fergana
- Number: 77

Senior career*
Years	Team	Apps	(Gls)
2017	Arapongas	6	(1)
2017	Itaberaí	12	(1)
2018	Itabaiana	12	(1)
2019–2021	Goiás	20	(0)
2019	→ Gwangju (loan)	8	(2)
2021	Paysandu	21	(1)
2022	Londrina	2	(0)
2022	Botafogo-PB	8	(0)
2022–2023	Retrô	23	(0)
2023	Maguary	6	(2)
2024–2025	Dinamo Samarqand	47	(5)
2026–	Neftchi Fergana	13	(1)
- * Club domestic league appearances and goals as of 20:25, 28 July 2026 (UTC)

Jurani Francisco Ferreira (born 1 October 1996), known as Ratinho, is a Brazilian professional footballer who plays as a midfielder for Uzbekistan Super League club the Neftchi Fergana.

== Professional career ==
Ratinho made his professional debut with Goiás in a 2–1 Campeonato Brasileiro Série B win over Atlético Clube Goianiense on 15 February 2018.

== Honours ==
Gwangju

- K League 2: 2019

Neftchi

- Uzbekistan Super Cup: 2026

Individual

- Uzbekistan Super League Goal of the Month: May 2025
