= Stephen Chinedu =

Nigerian professional football player

Personal information
- Full name: Stephen Chinedu
- Date of birth: 6 January 2000 (age 26)
- Place of birth: Kano, Nigeria
- Height: 1.88 m (6 ft 2 in)
- Position: Forward

Team information
- Current team: Pakhtakor (on loan from Surkhon)
- Number: 90

Youth career
- -2018: Romeo FC

Senior career*
Years	Team	Apps	(Gls)
2019	Neretvanac Opuzen	8	(6)
2019–2021	Hajduk Split	29	(7)
2020	→ Dugopolje (loan)	3	(1)
2021–2022	Dinamo Tirana	32	(3)
2022–2023	Solin	32	(9)
2023–2024	Široki Brijeg	43	(7)
2025	Radnički 1923	14	(3)
2025	Radnik	10	(0)
2026–	Surkhon	9	(5)
2026–	→ Pakhtakor (loan)	11	(3)
- * Club domestic league appearances and goals as of 12 October 2026

Stephen Chinedu (born 6 January 2000) is a Nigerian professional footballer who plays as a forward for Uzbekistan Super League club Pakhtakor, on loan from fellow Super League club Surkhon. Prior to signing with Radnički, Chinedu played football for Široki Brijeg, in Bosnia and Herzegovina.

== Career ==
On 11 July 2026, Uzbekistan Super League club Pakhtakor announced the signing of Chinedu on loan for the remainder of the season from fellow Super League club Surkhon.
