= Rustam Turdimurodov =

Uzbek footballer

Personal information
- Date of birth: 4 April 2004 (age 22)
- Place of birth: Samarkand, Uzbekistan
- Height: 1.82 m (6 ft 0 in)
- Position: Forward

Team information
- Current team: Pakhtakor
- Number: 14

Senior career*
| Years | Team | Apps | (Gls) |
| 2022– | Pakhtakor | 16 | (3) |
| 2023 | → Energetik-BGU (loan) | 11 | (0) |
| 2024–2025 | → Andijon (loan) | 33 | (9) |
| 2025 | → Surxon (loan) | 15 | (6) |

International career
| 2020 | Uzbekistan U17 | 2 | (0) |
| 2021–2022 | Uzbekistan U19 | 3 | (1) |
| 2023 | Uzbekistan U20 | 2 | (0) |
| 2024– | Uzbekistan U23 | 8 | (5) |
- * Club domestic league appearances and goals as of 28 July 2026

Rustam Turdimurodov (Uzbek: Rustam Turdimurodov; born 4 April 2004) is an Uzbek professional footballer who plays as a forward for Uzbekistan Super League club Pakhtakor.

== Career ==
=== Pakhtakor ===
He is a graduate of the football academy of Uzbekistan's Pakhtakor. In June 2022, Rustam began to be involved in the club's first-team matches. He made his debut for the club on 23 June 2022 against Qizilqum, coming on as a substitute in the final minutes of regular time. At the end of the season, he became the Uzbekistan Super League champion with the club in 2022.

At the beginning of 2023, the player trained with the first team, but until the summer transfer window he mainly remained a substitute. He made his first appearance of the 2023 season on 2 April 2023 against Metallurg Bekabad, coming on in the 87th minute. During the first half of the season, he made only two appearances in all competitions for the club.

=== Energetik-BGU ===
In July 2023, reports emerged that Belarusian club Energetik-BGU was interested in signing him. In August 2023, he officially signed a contract with the club.

In February 2024, he signed a contract with Andijon.

== International career ==
At the beginning of 2020, he participated in the "Taraqqiyot Cup" with Uzbekistan U-17 national team. In June 2022, he played friendly matches against Belarus with Uzbekistan U-19 national team, providing an assist and scoring a goal.

In May 2023, he was called up to the Uzbekistan U-20 national team to participate in the 2023 FIFA U-20 World Cup. He made his debut in the tournament on 20 May 2023 against the Argentina national team. The team finished second in the group stage and advanced to the knockout round. On 30 May 2023, they were eliminated in the Round of 16 after losing to Israel.

== Honours ==
Pakhtakor

- Uzbekistan Super League: 2022

Andijon

- Uzbekistan Cup: 2024
