= 2025 FC Neftchi Fergana season =

Neftchi Fergana
2024 season
- CEO: Mansur Tashmatov
- Head coach: Vitaly Levchenko
- Stadium: Istiqlol
- Uzbek League
- Uzbekistan Cup
- Top goalscorer: League: Zoran Marušić (6); All: Zoran Marušić (7)
- Average home league attendance: 12,198
- Biggest win: 4–0 vs Oqtepa
- Biggest defeat: 0–4 vs Pakhtakor
Home colours	Away colours

The 2025 season marks Fergana's "Neftchi" club's 30th season in the top league of Uzbek football and their 63rd consecutive season overall. In the current season, in addition to the domestic championship, Fergana's "Neftchi" team is also participating in the Uzbekistan Cup.

== Kits ==
Home	Away	Goalkeeper 1	Goalkeeper 2

== Players ==
As of 3 March 2025

Note: Flags indicate national team as defined under FIFA eligibility rules; some limited exceptions apply. Players may hold more than one non-FIFA nationality.

No.	Pos.	Nation	Player
1	GK	UZB	Botirali Ergashev
4	DF	SRB	Bojan Ciger
5	MF	UZB	Ikrom Alibaev
6	DF	UZB	Ibrokhimkhalil Yuldoshev
7	MF	UZB	Abror Ismoilov
8	MF	MNE	Vladimir Jovović
9	DF	UZB	Shohrux Gadoyev
10	MF	UZB	Jamshid Iskanderov
14	MF	UZB	Jamshid Boltaboev
17	FW	UZB	Mukhammadali Giyosov
20	DF	UZB	Anvarzhon Gofurov (captain)
21	DF	UZB	Muhsinzhon Ubaydullaev (vice-captain)

No.	Pos.	Nation	Player
22	FW	GEO	Toma Tabatadze
23	MF	SRB	Jovan Đokić
24	MF	UZB	Gulyamkhaydar Gulyamov (vice-captain)
25	GK	UZB	Eldorbek Suyunov
30	MF	UZB	Kuvondik Ruziev
32	FW	SRB	Zoran Marušić
33	DF	UZB	Shokhrukh Yokubzhonov
34	DF	UZB	Farrukh Sayfiev
44	DF	UZB	Mukhammadziyo Adhamjonov
45	GK	UZB	Akbar Turaev (vice-captain)
61	GK	UZB	Diyor Tulanboev
66	DF	UZB	Doniyor Valiev
77	MF	UZB	Bilolkhon Toshmirzaev

== Transfers ==
=== In ===
Date	Pos.	Player	From	Type	Ref.
9 December 2024	MF	(Montenegro) Vladimir Jovović	(Uzbekistan) Sogdiana	Free transfer	
9 December 2024	FW	(Serbia) Zoran Marušić	(Uzbekistan) Nasaf	Free transfer	
9 December 2024	FW	(Georgia (country)) Toma Tabatadze	(Uzbekistan) Navbahor	Free transfer	
9 December 2024	MF	(Uzbekistan) Abror Ismoilov	(Uzbekistan) Navbahor	Free transfer	
10 December 2024	FW	(Uzbekistan) Mukhammadali Giyosov	(Uzbekistan) Qizilqum	Free transfer	
10 December 2024	MF	(Serbia) Jovan Đokić	(Uzbekistan) Navbahor	Free transfer	
4 January 2025	DF	(Uzbekistan) Ikromjon Alibaev	(South Korea) Seongnam	Free transfer	
4 January 2025	GK	(Uzbekistan) Eldorbek Suyunov	(Uzbekistan) Navbahor	Free transfer	
4 January 2025	DF	(Uzbekistan) Shohrux Gadoyev	(Uzbekistan) AGMK	Free transfer	
4 January 2025	DF	(Uzbekistan) Farrukh Sayfiev	(Uzbekistan) Navbahor	Free transfer	
8 January 2025	MF	(Uzbekistan) Jamshid Boltaboev	(Uzbekistan) Navbahor	Free transfer	
8 January 2025	MF	(Uzbekistan) Jamshid Iskanderov	(Uzbekistan) Navbahor	Free transfer	
29 January 2025	DF	(Uzbekistan) Ibrokhimkhalil Yuldoshev	(Russia) Nizhny Novgorod	Free transfer	

=== Out ===
Date	Pos.	Player	To	Type	Ref.
30 December 2024	MF	(Uzbekistan) Sanjar Kodirkulov	(Uzbekistan) Dinamo Samarqand	End of contract	
30 December 2024	MF	(Uzbekistan) Abbos Gulomov	(Uzbekistan) Navbahor	End of contract	
30 December 2024	DF	(Uzbekistan) Khurshidbek Mukhtorov	(Kazakhstan) Turan	End of contract	
30 December 2024	DF	(Tajikistan) Zoir Dzhuraboyev	(Uzbekistan) Sogdiana	End of contract	
30 December 2024	DF	(Tajikistan) Manuchekhr Safarov	(Uzbekistan) Dinamo Samarqand	End of contract	
30 December 2024	DF	(Uzbekistan) Jaloliddin Jumaboev	(Uzbekistan) Navbahor	End of contract	
30 December 2024	DF	(Uzbekistan) Mirzokhid Gofurov	(Uzbekistan) Dinamo Samarqand	End of contract	
30 December 2024	MF	(Uzbekistan) Sardor Abduraimov	(Uzbekistan) Mash'al	End of contract	
30 December 2024	FW	(Uzbekistan) Bekhruzbek Oblakulov	(Uzbekistan) Dinamo Samarqand	End of contract	
30 December 2024	MF	(Uzbekistan) Javokhir Kakhramonov	(Uzbekistan) Sogdiana	End of contract	
30 December 2024	FW	(Uzbekistan) Khusayin Norchaev	(Uzbekistan) Alania Vladikavkaz	End of loan	
30 December 2024	FW	(Uzbekistan) Shokhruz Norkhonov	(Uzbekistan) Bukhara	End of contract	
8 January 2025	FW	(Uzbekistan) Azizbek Amonov	(Uzbekistan) Bunyodkor	End of contract	
10 February 2025	FW	(Nigeria) Effiong Nsungusi	(Romania) UTA Arad	End of contract	
16 February 2025	MF	(Uzbekistan) Diyorjon Turapov	(Uzbekistan) Lokomotiv	End of contract	

=== Contract renewals ===
Date	Pos.	Player	Contract length	Contract ends	Ref.
26 December 2024	MF	(Uzbekistan) Bilolkhan Toshmirzaev	Two years	2026	
31 December 2024	GK	(Uzbekistan) Akbar Turaev	One year	2025	
3 January 2025	DF	(Uzbekistan) Mukhsin Ubaydullaev	One year	2025	
25 January 2025	DF	(Uzbekistan) Anvarjon Gofurov	Two years	2026	
25 February 2025	MF	(Uzbekistan) Shokhrukhbek Yokubjonov	Two years	2026	

== Competitions ==
=== Super League ===
==== League table ====
Pos	Team	Pld	W	D	L	GF	GA	GD	Pts	Qualification or relegation
1	Neftchi (C)	30	19	7	4	49	24	+25	64	Qualification for AFC Champions League Elite league stage
2	Pakhtakor	30	18	6	6	59	23	+36	60	Qualification for AFC Champions League Elite preliminary stage (Note: As Uzbekistan Cup winners)
3	Nasaf	30	16	11	3	51	23	+28	59	Qualification for AFC Champions League Two group stage
4	Dinamo	30	16	10	4	47	30	+17	58	Qualification for Silk Way Cup group stage
5	Bunyodkor	30	13	10	7	48	40	+8	49	

Source: Uzbekistan Professional Football League
Rules for classification: 1) points; 2) head-to-head points; 3) head-to-head goal difference; 4) head-to-head away goals scored; 5) goal difference; 6) number of goals scored.
(C) Champions

==== Results summary ====
Overall								Home						Away					
Pld	W	D	L	GF	GA	GD	Pts	W	D	L	GF	GA	GD	W	D	L	GF	GA	GD
15	8	6	1	25	13	+12	30	5	1	1	12	7	+5	3	5	0	13	6	+7

Last updated: 7 July 2025.
Source: See Results

==== Results by round ====
Round	1	2	3	4	5	6	7	8	9	10	11	12	13	14	15
Ground	A	H	A	H	A	H	H	A	A	H	A	H	A	A	H
Result	D	D	D	W	W	L	W	W	D	W	D	W	D	W	W
Position	5	9	9	7	4	6	7	5	5	6	4	4	3	4	2

Source: See Results
A = Away; H = Home; W = Win; D = Draw; L = Loss

==== Results ====
8 March 2025 1	Bunyodkor	2–2	Neftchi Fergana	Tashkent
20:00 UZT (UTC+5)	Normurodov 8'; Abdukholiqov (yellow card) 70'; Urata 73'	Report	Marušić 15'; Yuldoshev 46'	Stadium: Bunyodkor Stadium; Attendance: 3,200; Referee: Temurbek Tukhtasinov

14 March 2025 2	Neftchi Fergana	0–0	Kokand 1912	Fergana
19:30 UZT (UTC+5)	Toshmirzaev (yellow card) 90'	Report	Yoqubov (yellow card) 10'	Stadium: Istiqlol Stadium; Attendance: 10,250; Referee: Ilgiz Tantashev

29 March 2025 3	Nasaf	0–0	Neftchi Fergana	Qarshi
19:30 UZT (UTC+5)	Abdurakhmatov (yellow card) 26'; Norchaev (yellow card) 50'	Report	Gadoyev (yellow card) 11'; Iskanderov (yellow card) 78'	Stadium: Markaziy Stadium; Attendance: 4,653; Referee: Ahrol Risqullayev

5 April 2025 4	Neftchi Fergana	3–2	Navbahor	Fergana
19:30 UZT (UTC+5)	Sayfiev (yellow card) 37'; Toshmirzaev 48'; Alibaev (yellow card) 61'; Marušić 64', 72' (yellow card) 72'	Report	Komilov (yellow card) 25'; Ahmedov 30' (yellow card) 37'; Jiyanov 49'	Stadium: Istiqlol Stadium; Attendance: 14,552; Referee: Rustam Lutfullin

11 April 2025 5	Mash'al	1–4	Neftchi Fergana	Olmaliq
18:00 UZT (UTC+5)		Report		Stadium: AGMK Stadium; Attendance: 499

19 April 2025 6	Neftchi Fergana	0–4	Pakhtakor	Fergana
18:00 UZT (UTC+5)		Report		Stadium: Istiqlol Stadium; Attendance: 15,500

4 May 2025 8	Neftchi Fergana	2–1	Sogdiana	Fergana
18:00 UZT (UTC+5)		Report		Stadium: Istiqlol Stadium; Attendance: 6,500

9 May 2025 9	Andijon	0–2	Neftchi Fergana	Andijon
18:00 UZT (UTC+5)		Report		Stadium: Bobur Arena; Attendance: 9,124

19 May 2025 10	AGMK	2–2	Neftchi Fergana	Olmaliq
18:00 UZT (UTC+5)		Report		Stadium: AGMK Stadium; Attendance: 8,315

24 May 2025 11	Neftchi Fergana	4–0	Shurtan	Fergana
19:00 UZT (UTC+5)		Report		Stadium: Istiqlol Stadium; Attendance: 4,240

15 June 2025 12	Surkhon	0–0	Neftchi Fergana	Termez
20:00 UZT (UTC+5)		Report		Stadium: Surkhon Stadium; Attendance: 4,240

20 June 2025 13	Neftchi Fergana	1–0	Bukhara	Fergana
20:00 UZT (UTC+5)	Toshmirzayev (yellow card) 77'; Đokić 89'	Report	Kulmatov (yellow card) 19'; Ruziev (yellow card) 45+1'; Qayumov (yellow card) 84'	Stadium: Istiqlol Stadium; Attendance: 8,512; Referee: Doston Rahmonov

28 June 2025 14	Qizilqum	1–1	Neftchi Fergana	Navoi
20:00 UZT (UTC+5)	Paparyha (yellow card) 56'; Vahobov (yellow card) 67'; Alibaev 90+5' (o.g.)	Report	Yuldoshev (yellow card) 35'; Alibaev 69'	Stadium: Youth Sports Complex; Attendance: 3700; Referee: Abdurashid Khudoyberganov

2 July 2025 7	Dinamo Samarqand	0–2	Neftchi Fergana	Samarqand
20:00 UZT (UTC+5)		Report	Yuldoshev 24' Đokić (yellow card) 59' Gofurov (yellow card) 70' Ismoilov 78'	Stadium: Dinamo Stadium; Attendance: 11485; Referee: Firdavs Norsafarov

7 July 2025 15	Neftchi Fergana	2–0	Khorazm	Fergana
20:00 UZT (UTC+5)	Gofurov (yellow card) 1'; Tabatadze 12'; Ciger (yellow card) 41'; Alibaev (yellow card) 61'; Marušić 71' (yellow card) 71'	Report	Bobojonov (yellow card) 41'; Juraev (yellow card) 64'; Toshpulatov (yellow card) 68'	Stadium: Istiqlol Stadium; Attendance: 9200; Referee: Ibrohim Ismoilov

2 August 2025 16	Neftchi Fergana	1–2	Bunyodkor	Fergana
20:00 UZT (UTC+5)	Muhsinzhon Ubaydullaev (yellow card) 23'; Ciger 55'	Report	Šroler 50'; Sardor Abdunabiev 87' (yellow card) 87'	Stadium: Istiqlol Stadium; Attendance: 15,240; Referee: (Uzbekistan) T Toxtasinov

7 August 2025 17	Kokand 1912	1–2	Neftchi Fergana	Kokand
20:00 UZT (UTC+5)	Gvazava (yellow card) 36'; Shokhrukh Gadoev 83'	Report	Odilov 9'; Đokić 89'	Stadium: Kokand Markaziy Stadium; Attendance: 4,900; Referee: (Uzbekistan) G Djuraev

11 August 2025 18	Neftchi Fergana	1–0	Nasaf	Fergana
20:00 UZT (UTC+5)	Sayfiev (red card) 24'; Iskanderov 28' (pen.); Alibaev (yellow card) 62'; Ismoilov (yellow card) 76'	Report	Nasrullaev (yellow card) 40'; Mukhiddinov (yellow card) 67'; Eshmurodov (yellow card) 90+1'	Stadium: Istiqlol Stadium; Attendance: 14,502; Referee: (Uzbekistan) I Tantashev

=== Uzbek Cup ===
==== Group stage ====
On February 25, the draw for the group stage of the Uzbekistan Cup was held, and Neftchi was placed in Group E, along with Namangan's Navbahor, FarDU, and Oqtepa.

15 April 2025 1	Navbahor Namangan	1–1	Neftchi Fergana	Namangan
20:15 UZT (UTC+5)	Guedes 90+7' (yellow card) 90+7'; Akhmedov (yellow card) 68'; Komilov (yellow card) 15'	Report	Marušić 49'; Sayfiev (yellow card) 10'; Yuldoshev (red card) 60'	Stadium: Markaziy Stadium; Attendance: 15,250; Referee: Ilgiz Tantashev

30 April 2025 2	Neftchi Fergana	3–1	FarDU	Fergana
20:15 UZT (UTC+5)	Alibaev 26'; Ismoilov 34'; Toshmirzaev 75'	Report	Rasulov 69'; Olimov (yellow card) 71'	Stadium: Istiqlol Stadium; Attendance: 4,816; Referee: Umidjon Rahimjonov

14 May 2025 3	Neftchi Fergana	4–0	Oqtepa	Fergana
20:15 UZT (UTC+5)	Tabatadze 27' (yellow card) 53'; Gadoyev 48'; Gofurov 56'; Giyosov 82'	Report		Stadium: Istiqlol Stadium; Attendance: 1,155; Referee: Isroil Imomnazarov

==== Knockout stages ====
24 June 2025 3	Neftchi Fergana	0–1	Mash'al	Fergana
19:30 UZT (UTC+5)		Report	Abduraimov 6'	Stadium: Istiqlol Stadium; Attendance: 2506; Referee: Ahrol Risqullayev

=== Friendlies ===
12 January 2026 Friendly	FC Neftchi Fergana	0–5	(Azerbaijan) Qarabağ	Belek, Turkey
AZT (UTC+4)				Stadium: Gloria Sports Arena

== Statistics ==
=== Squad statistics ===
As of match played 23 November 2025

No.	Pos	Nat	Player	Total		Super League		Uzbekistan Cup	
No.	Pos	Nat	Player	Apps	Goals	Apps	Goals	Apps	Goals
1	GK	(Uzbekistan)	Botirali Ergashev	29	0	26	0	3	0
4	DF	(Serbia)	Bojan Ciger	26	3	24	3	2	0
5	MF	(Uzbekistan)	Ikrom Alibaev	32	4	28	3	4	1
6	DF	(Uzbekistan)	Ibrokhimkhalil Yuldoshev	24	4	21	4	3	0
7	MF	(Uzbekistan)	Abror Ismoilov	32	5	29	4	3	1
8	MF	(Montenegro)	Vladimir Jovović	19	3	18	3	1	0
9	FW	(Kyrgyzstan)	Joel Kojo	11	3	11	3	0	0
10	MF	(Uzbekistan)	Jamshid Iskanderov	33	7	29	7	4	0
11	MF	(Uzbekistan)	Kuvondik Ruziev	29	0	26	0	3	0
15	MF	(Uzbekistan)	Shakhzod Nematzhonov	4	0	4	0	0	0
20	DF	(Uzbekistan)	Anvarzhon Gofurov	32	3	28	2	4	1
21	DF	(Uzbekistan)	Muhsinzhon Ubaydullaev	30	0	26	0	4	0
22	FW	(Uzbekistan)	Alisher Odilov	13	3	13	3	0	0
23	MF	(Serbia)	Jovan Đokić	26	3	24	3	2	0
24	MF	(Uzbekistan)	Gulyamkhaydar Gulyamov	19	0	16	0	3	0
28	MF	(Uzbekistan)	Nodirbek Karimov	2	0	0	0	2	0
25	GK	(Uzbekistan)	Eldorbek Suyunov	4	0	4	0	0	0
32	FW	(Serbia)	Zoran Marušić	25	9	23	8	2	1
33	DF	(Uzbekistan)	Shokhrukhbek Yokubjonov	1	0	0	0	1	0
34	DF	(Uzbekistan)	Farrukh Sayfiev	20	1	18	1	2	0
45	GK	(Uzbekistan)	Akbar Turaev	1	0	0	0	1	0
70	FW	(Liberia)	Sylvanus Nimely	6	0	6	0	0	0
77	MF	(Uzbekistan)	Bilolkhon Toshmirzaev	25	4	22	3	3	1
	MF	(Uzbekistan)	Jamshid Boltaboev	14	0	10	0	4	0
	MF	(Uzbekistan)	Shohrux Gadoyev	8	1	5	0	3	1
	FW	(Georgia (country))	Toma Tabatadze	16	2	12	1	4	1
	FW	(Uzbekistan)	Mukhammadali Giyosov	15	1	13	0	2	1
	DF	(Uzbekistan)	Doniyor Valiev	1	0	0	0	1	0

Last updated: 23 November 2025
Source: UZPFL

=== Goals ===
As of 23 November 2025

Rank	Player	UzSL	UC	Total
1	(Serbia) Zoran Marušić	8	1	9
2	(Uzbekistan) Jamshid Iskanderov	6	0	6
3	(Uzbekistan) Abror Ismoilov	4	1	5
4	(Uzbekistan) Bilolkhon Toshmirzaev	3	1	4
5	(Uzbekistan) Ikrom Alibaev	3	1	4
6	(Uzbekistan) Ibrokhimkhalil Yuldoshev	3	0	3
7	(Uzbekistan) Anvarzhon Gofurov	2	1	3
8	(Serbia) Jovan Đokić	3	0	3
9	(Kyrgyzstan) Joel Kojo	3	0	3
10	(Serbia) Bojan Ciger	3	0	3
11	(Montenegro) Vladimir Jovović	3	0	3
12	(Georgia (country)) Toma Tabatadze	1	1	2
13	(Uzbekistan) Farrukh Sayfiev	1	0	1
14	(Uzbekistan) Alisher Odilov	1	0	1
15	(Uzbekistan) Mukhammadali Giyosov	0	1	1
16	(Uzbekistan) Shohrux Gadoyev	0	1	1
Own goals		1	0	1
Total		42	8	50

Source:UzPFL

=== Clean sheets ===
As of 23 November 2025

Rank	Player	UzSL	UC	Total
1	(Uzbekistan) Botirali Ergashev	14	0	14
2	(Uzbekistan) Eldorbek Suyunov	2	0	2
3	(Uzbekistan) Akbar Turaev	0	1	1
Total		16	1	17

Source:UzPFL

=== Disciplinary record ===
N	P	Nat.	Name	UzSL			UC			Total			Notes
N	P	Nat.	Name	Yellow card	Second yellow card	Red card	Yellow card	Second yellow card	Red card	Yellow card	Second yellow card	Red card	Notes
6	MF	(Uzbekistan)	Ibrokhimkhalil Yuldoshev	5					1	5		1	
20	MF	(Uzbekistan)	Anvarzhon Gofurov	7						7			
34	DF	(Uzbekistan)	Farrukh Sayfiev	3		1	1			4		1	
5	MF	(Uzbekistan)	Ikrom Alibaev	3		1				3		1	
10	MF	(Uzbekistan)	Jamshid Iskanderov	2						2			
77	MF	(Uzbekistan)	Bilolkhon Toshmirzaev	2						2			
32	MF	(Serbia)	Zoran Marušić	3						3			
4	MF	(Uzbekistan)	Bojan Ciger	2						2			
21	MF	(Uzbekistan)	Muhsinzhon Ubaydullaev	2						2			
7	MF	(Uzbekistan)	Abror Ismoilov	3						3			
24	MF	(Uzbekistan)	Gulyamkhaydar Gulyamov	1						1			
33	MF	(Serbia)	Jovan Dokic	1						1			
11	MF	(Uzbekistan)	Kuvondik Ruziev	1						1			
22	MF	(Uzbekistan)	Alisher Odilov	1						1			
8	MF	(Montenegro)	Vladimir Jovović	1						1			
	MF	(Uzbekistan)	Jamshid Boltaboev	1						1			
	FW	(Georgia (country))	Toma Tabatadze				1			1			
	FW	(Uzbekistan)	Mukhammadali Giyosov	1						1			
	MF	(Uzbekistan)	Shohrux Gadoyev	1						1			

Last updated: 23 November 2025
Source: UZPFL
Ordered by (red card) , (second yellow card) and (yellow card)
(yellow card) = Number of bookings; (second yellow card) = Number of sending offs after a second yellow card; (red card) = Number of sending offs by a direct red card.
