= 2024 Uzbekistan Super League =

Season of top level football in Uzbekistan

Uzbekistan Super League
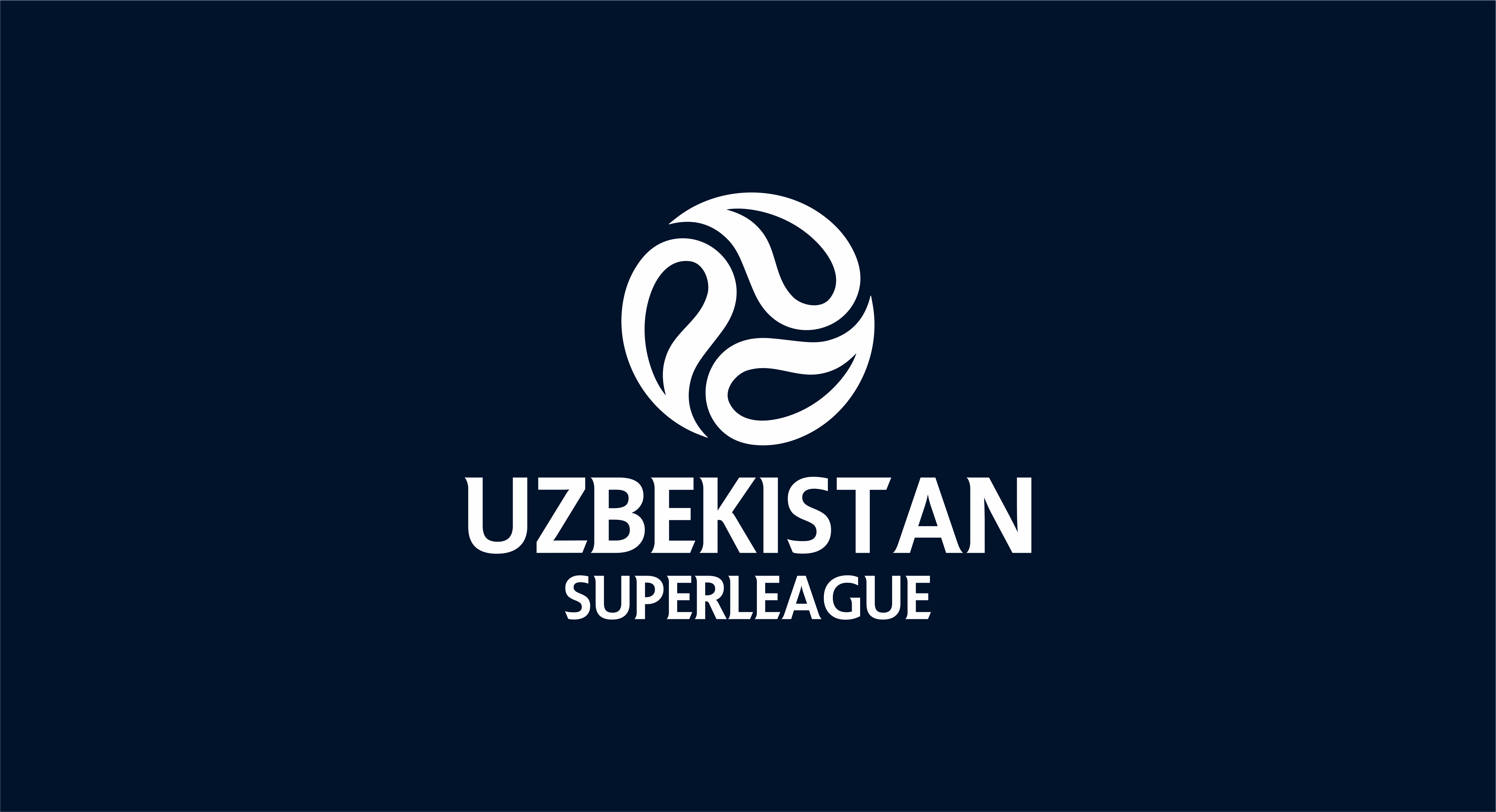
- Season: 2024
- Dates: 3 March – 30 November 2024
- Champions: Nasaf
- Relegated: Olympic Tashkent; Metallurg Bekabad; Lokomotiv Tashkent
- 2025–26 AFC Champions League Elite: Nasaf
- 2025–26 AFC Champions League Two: Andijon
- Matches: 104
- Goals: 251 (2.41 per match)
- Top goalscorer: Dragan Ćeran (13 goals)
- Biggest home win: Pakhtakor 6–0 Olympic Tashkent (25 September 2024)
- Biggest away win: Qizilqum 1–5 Navbahor Namangan (22 November 2024)
- Highest scoring: AGMK 5–3 Sogdiana (19 May 2024)
- Longest winning run: (6 Matches); Nasaf
- Longest unbeaten run: (10 Matches); Nasaf
- Longest winless run: (18 Matches); Metallurg
- Longest losing run: (5 Matches); Andijon
- Highest attendance: 22,350 - Navbahor Namangan vs Neftchi Fergana (19 May 2024)
- Lowest attendance: 112 - Olympic Tashkent vs Metallurg Bekabad (16 September 2024)
- Average attendance: 3,828 (12 October 2024)
- All statistics correct as of 24 November 2024.

The 2024 Uzbekistan Super League (Uzbek: Футбол бўйича 2024-йилги Ўзбекистон Суперлигаси) was the 33rd season of top-level football in Uzbekistan since its establishment in 1992. Pakhtakor Tashkent are the defending champions for the 2023 campaign. Lokomotiv Tashkent and Dinamo Samarqand teams promoted to the 2024 Super League. The first matches took place on 3 March 2024.

This is last season as 14 teams for 2024, from next season expand to 16 teams.

== Teams ==
Location of teams in 2024 Uzbekistan Super League

Andijon	Bunyodkor	Dinamo
Bobur Arena	Milliy Stadium	Sogdiana Stadium
Capacity: 18,360	Capacity: 34,000	Capacity: 11,650
Lokomotiv	Metallurg	Nasaf
Lokomotiv Stadium	AGMK Stadium	Markaziy Stadium
Capacity:8,000	Capacity: 12,415	Capacity: 22,000
Navbahor	Neftchi	Olympic
Markaziy Stadium	Istiqlol Stadium	JAR Stadium
Capacity: 21,913	Capacity: 20,000	Capacity: 8,460
	Istiklal Stadium in Fergana	
AGMK	Pakhtakor	Qizilqum
AGMK Stadium	Central Stadium	Markaziy Stadium
Capacity: 12,415	Capacity: 35,000	Capacity: 21,000
Sogdiana	Surkhon	
Sogdiana Stadium	Central Stadium	
Capacity: 11,650	Capacity: 35,000	

Club	Coach	Location	Kit sponsor	Shirt sponsor
AGMK	(Uzbekistan) Mirjalol Qosimov	Olmaliq	(Uzbekistan) 7Saber	AKMK
Andijon	(Russia) Alexander Khomyakov	Andijan	(Denmark) Hummel	
Bunyodkor	(Tajikistan) Sergey Arslanov	Tashkent	(Germany) Jako	Uzbekneftegaz
Dinamo Samarqand	(Uzbekistan) Vadim Abramov	Samarqand	(Germany) Puma	Agromir Buildings
Lokomotiv Tashkent		Tashkent	(Uzbekistan) 7Saber	Jahon Invest Plast, Sitronic, Drivers' Village^{1}, Uztelecom^{1}
Metallurg	(Uzbekistan) Grigoriy Kolosovskiy	Bekabad	(Germany) Adidas	Uzbekistan Metallurgy Combinat
Nasaf	(Uzbekistan) Ruziqul Berdiev	Qarshi	(Spain) Kelme	Uzbekistan GTL SGCC, ENTER Engineering^{1}
Navbahor	(Uzbekistan) Sergey Lushan	Namangan	(Uzbekistan) 7Saber	E-Auksion
Neftchi Fergana	(Tajikistan) Vitaly Levchenko	Fergana	(Germany) Adidas	FNQIZ
Olympic Tashkent	(Uzbekistan) Timur Kapadze	Tashkent	(United States) Nike	Trustbank, Uzmobi^{1}
Pakhtakor	(Uzbekistan) Maksim Shatskikh	Tashkent	(Germany) Puma	Akfa, UzCard^{1}
Qizilqum	(Uzbekistan) Jamshid Saidov	Navoiy	(Germany) Puma	NMMC
Sogdiana	(Montenegro) Ivan Bošković	Jizzakh	(Spain) Joma	BMB Energo
Surkhon Termez	(Uzbekistan) Fevzi Davletov	Termez	(Germany) Jako	Eriel

=== Managerial changes ===
Team	Outgoing manager	Manner of departure	Date of vacancy	Position in table	Replaced by	Date of appointment	Ref.
Bunyodkor	Ivan Bubalo		16 March 2024	14th	Anvar Gafurov (Acting)	16 March 2024	
Bunyodkor	Anvar Gafurov (Acting)	End of role	28 March 2024	12th	Sergey Arslanov	28 March 2024	
Metallurg Bekabad	Luisma Hernández			Preseason	Vesco Stesevic		
Lokomotiv Tashkent	Aleksandar Stoimirović		5 June 2024	13th	Aleksandr Krestinin	12th	
Navbahor	Samvel Babayan		29 June 2024	4th	Grigoriy Kolosovskiy (Acting)	29 June 2024	
Navbahor	Grigoriy Kolosovskiy (Acting)		19 July 20204	6th	Sergey Lushan	19 July 2024	
Metallurg Bekabad	Vesco Stesevic	Resigned	17 June 2024	14th	Ilyas Kurbonov	18 June 2024	
Qizilqum Zarafshon	Asror Aliqulov		23 June 2024	10th	Jamshid Saidov	24 June 2024	
Metallurg Bekabad	Ilyas Kurbonov		12 July 2024	14th	Grigoriy Kolosovskiy	12 July 2024	
Olympic Tashkent	Timur Kapadze		31 July 2024	8th	Denis Korostichenko	1 August 2024	
Lokomotiv Tashkent	Aleksandr Krestinin	Resigned	5 November 2024	13th			

== Foreign players ==
Clubs can register a total of seven foreign players over the course of the season, provided that one of them do not exceed the age of 21 (born in 2002 and under)

- Players in italics were out of squad or left club within the season after pre-season transfer window or in the mid-season transfer window and at least had one appearance.

Club	Player 1	Player 2	Player 3	Player 4	Player 5	U21 Players	AFC players	Former players
AGMK	(Albania) **Klejdi Daci**	(Croatia) **Mihael Klepač**	(Georgia (country)) Giorgi Papava	(Georgia (country)) Irakli Rukhadze	(Spain) Rubén Sánchez		(Japan) Arihiro Sentoku	(Serbia) Miljan Škrbić
Andijon	(Bosnia and Herzegovina) **Ljubiša Pecelj**	(Georgia (country)) Levan Arveladze	(Kazakhstan) **Abinur Nurimbet**	(Serbia) Vladimir Bubanja	(Ukraine) Ihor Lytovka	(Syria) Maksim Sarraf (Russia) Luka Zgursky	(Tajikistan) Shakhrom Samiev	(North Macedonia) Demir Imeri (Montenegro) Armin Bošnjak
Bunyodkor	(Albania) **Luis Kaçorri**	(Croatia) **Andrija Filipović**	(Croatia) Frane Čirjak	(Croatia) Marin Ljubić	(Montenegro) Momčilo Rašo		(Japan) **Itsuki Urata**	(Bosnia and Herzegovina) Samir Zeljković (Croatia) Toni Jović
Dinamo Samarqand	(Brazil) Ratinho	(Brazil) Maycon Douglas	(Ghana) Francis Narh	(Serbia) Dušan Mijić		(Brazil) **Marcos Kayck**	(Kyrgyzstan) Joel Kojo	(Ghana) Emmanuel Yaghr (Belarus) Artyom Sokol
Lokomotiv Tashkent	(Serbia) Ivan Rogač	(Russia) **Konstantin Bazelyuk**	(Russia) **Mikhail Gashchenkov**	(Russia) **Rustam Khalnazarov**			(Kyrgyzstan) **Valery Kichin**	(Bosnia and Herzegovina) Damjan Krajišnik (Montenegro) Ivan Bulatović
Metallurg Bekabad	(Bosnia and Herzegovina) Kerim Palić	(Montenegro) Marko Milićković	(Montenegro) **Balša Sekulić**	(Serbia) Ivan Josović	(Ukraine) **Oleksandr Kucherenko**	(Tajikistan) Daler Sharipov		(Iran) Reza Yazdandoost (Montenegro) Boban Đorđević (Tajikistan) Davronjon Ergashev
Nasaf	(Brazil) Victor da Silva	(Georgia (country)) Jaba Jighauri	(Serbia) Marko Stanojević	(Serbia) Zoran Marušić	(Serbia) **Stefan Čolović**		(Australia) / (South Sudan) **Valentino Yuel** (Note: Yuel is a South Sudan international but since he has Australian citizenship counts as an Asian Player.)	(Georgia (country)) Temur Chogadze
Navbahor Namangan	(Georgia (country)) Toma Tabatadze	(Georgia (country)) Giorgi Nikabadze	(Serbia) Jovan Đokić	(Serbia) Filip Ivanović			(Iran) Siavash Hagh Nazari	
Neftchi Fergana	(Nigeria) Effiong Nsungusi	(Romania) Mihai Roman	(Serbia) Bojan Ciger	(Tajikistan) Manuchekhr Safarov			(Tajikistan) Zoir Dzhuraboyev	(Moldova) Cătălin Carp
Olympic Tashkent								
Pakhtakor Tashkent	(Belarus) Pavel Pavlyuchenko	(Serbia) Dragan Ćeran				(Kyrgyzstan) Kimi Merk		
Qizilqum Zarafshon	(Georgia (country)) Giorgi Kukhianidze	(Georgia (country)) Akaki Shulaia	(Georgia (country)) Elguja Lobjanidze	(Latvia) Roberts Ozols	(Russia) Nikolai Tarasov			
Sogdiana Jizzakh	(Belarus) Aleksey Nosko	(Montenegro) Zoran Petrović	(Montenegro) Vladimir Jovović	(North Macedonia) Ljupcho Doriev	(Serbia) Milan Mitrović			
Surkhon Termez	(Russia) Dmitriy Pletnyov	(Russia) **Dzhamaldin Khodzhaniyazov**	(Russia) **Tamirlan Dzhamalutdinov**					(Liberia) Sylvanus Nimely (Russia) Artyom Potapov

- Players name in **bold** indicates the player is registered during the mid-season transfer window.

== League table ==
Pos	Team	Pld	W	D	L	GF	GA	GD	Pts	Qualification or relegation
1	Nasaf (C)	26	15	7	4	35	18	+17	52	Qualification for AFC Champions League Elite league stage
2	AGMK	26	14	5	7	40	29	+11	47	
3	Sogdiana	26	12	7	7	41	29	+12	43	
4	Navbahor	26	11	10	5	42	31	+11	43	
5	Neftchi	26	11	10	5	32	24	+8	43	
6	Pakhtakor	26	11	5	10	42	37	+5	38	
7	Surkhon	26	10	6	10	30	31	−1	36	
8	Dinamo Samarqand	26	9	5	12	35	38	−3	32	
9	Andijon	26	6	12	8	36	36	0	30	Qualification for the AFC Champions League Two group stage (Note: As 2024 Uzbekistan Cup winners)
10	Bunyodkor	26	7	9	10	27	38	−11	30	
11	Qizilqum	26	6	9	11	25	34	−9	27	
12	Olympic (R)	26	6	7	13	22	38	−16	25	Relegation play off Uzbekistan Pro League
13	Metallurg (R)	26	3	14	9	22	30	−8	23	Relegation play off Uzbekistan Pro League
14	Lokomotiv Tashkent (R)	26	5	6	15	28	44	−16	21	Relegation to Uzbekistan Pro League

Source: Uzbekistan Professional Football League
Rules for classification: 1) points; 2) head-to-head points; 3) head-to-head goal difference; 4) head-to-head away goals scored; 5) goal difference; 6) number of goals scored.
(C) Champions; (R) Relegated

=== Round 1 ===
1 March 2024 1	Navbahor	3–1	Dinamo	Namangan
19:15 UZT (UTC+5)	Ismoilov 18'; Tabatadze 47', 84'	Report (in Uzbek)	Kojo 53'	Stadium: Navbahor; Attendance: 7891; Referee: Rahimbek Karimov

1 March 2024 2	Nasaf	2—0	Olimpik	Qarshi
18:30 UZT (UTC+5)	Mozgovoy 63'; Marušić 77'	Report (in Uzbek)		Stadium: Qarshi; Attendance: 1154; Referee: Aziz Asimov

2 March 2024 3	Bunyodkor	1—3	Qizilqum	Toshkent
17:00 UZT (UTC+5)	Abduxoliqov 78'	Report (in Uzbek)	Kuxianidze 26'; Joʻrabekov 33'; Shukrullayev 45'	Stadium: Bunyodkor; Attendance: 251; Referee: Rustam Lutfullin

2 March 2024 4	Soʻgʻdiyona	1–2	Neftchi	Jizzax
19:15 UZT (UTC+5)	Doriyev 90+3'	Report (in Uzbek)	Effiong 14', 60'	Stadium: Soʻgʻdiyona; Attendance: 1810; Referee: Asker Najafaliyev

3 March 2024 5	AGMK	0–0	Andijon	Tashkent Region
15:00 UZT (UTC+5)		Report (in Uzbek)		Stadium: OKMK; Attendance: 890; Referee: Gʻayrat Joʻrayev

3 March 2024 6	Lokomotiv	2—2	Metallurg Bekabad	Toshkent
17:15 UZT (UTC+5)	Komilov 8', 88'	Report (in Uzbek)	Ubaydullayev 45'; Toshqoʻziyev 51'	Stadium: Lokomotiv; Attendance: 812; Referee: Olim Toʻychiboyev

4 March 2024 7	Surxon	0—3	Paxtakor	Toshkent
18:30 UZT (UTC+5)		Report (in Uzbek)	Ćeran 3'; Hamdamov 52'; Ćeran 70'	Stadium: Paxtakor; Attendance: 689; Referee: Abdurashid Xudoyberganov

=== Round 2 ===
8 March 2024 1	Metallurg	0–0	Soʻgʻdiyona	Tashkent Region
15:00 UZT (UTC+5)		Report (in Uzbek)		Stadium: OKMK; Attendance: 723; Referee: Ibrohim Ismoilov

8 March 2024 2	Paxtakor	0–0	Nasaf	Toshkent
17:15 UZT (UTC+5)		Report (in Uzbek)		Stadium: Paxtakor; Attendance: 3220

9 March 2024 3	Olimpik	0–1	Lokomotiv	Toshkent
16:00 UZT (UTC+5)		Report (in Uzbek)	Krajišnik 42'	Stadium: Bunyodkor; Attendance: 320

9 March 2024 4	Navbahor	1–1	AGMK	Namangan
18:30 UZT (UTC+5)	Rahmonov 11'	Report (in Uzbek)	Tabatadze 19'	Stadium: Namangan; Attendance: 10362; Referee: Ilgiz Tantashev

10 March 2024 5	Andijon	5–1	Bunyodkor	Andijon
15:00 UZT (UTC+5)	Zgurskiy 7'; Bubanja 42'; Mamatkazin 45+5'; Toirov 85'; Bošnjak 89'	Report (in Uzbek)	Zeljković 32'	Stadium: Bobur arena Attendance: 10140; Referee: Aziz Asimov

10 March 2024 6	Dinamo	0–1	Neftchi	Jizzax
17:15 UZT (UTC+5)		Report (in Uzbek)	Gʻulomov 51'	Stadium: Soʻgʻdiyona; Attendance: 1672; Referee: Firdavs Norsafarov

11 March 2024 7	Qizilqum	2–1	Surxon	Navoiy
18:30 UZT (UTC+5)	Kuxianidze 23'; Shulaia 44'	Report (in Uzbek)	Abdusalomov 70'	Stadium: Navoiy; Attendance: 689; Referee: Abdurashid Xudoyberganov

=== Round 3 ===
14 March 2024 1	Lokomotiv	3–0	Paxtakor	Toshkent
18.45 UZT (UTC+5)	Abdunabiyev 21'; Krajišnik 38'; Bulatović 47'	Report (in Uzbek)		Stadium: Lokomotiv; Attendance: 836; Referee: Rustam Lutfullin

15 March 2024 2	Neftchi	1–0	Metallurg	Istiqlol
18.30 UZT (UTC+5)	Carp 89'	Report (in Uzbek)		Attendance: 9251; Referee: Gʻayrat Joʻrayev

15 March 2024 3	Soʻgʻdiyona	2–2	Olimpik	Jizzax
UZT (UTC+5)	Abdurahmonov 3'; Zoteyev 44'	Report (in Uzbek)	Zevadinov 45+5'; Odilov 53'	Stadium: Soʻgʻdiyona; Attendance: 1322; Referee: Firdavs Norsafarov

16 March 2024 4	Surxon	2–3	Andijon	Toshkent
UZT (UTC+5)	Pirmuhammadov 73'; Abdurahmonov 82'	Report (in Uzbek)	Esanov 36'; Sohibjonov 50'; Sherboʻtayev 90+4'	Stadium: Paxtakor; Attendance: 968

16 March 2024 5	Nasaf	2–1	Qizilqum	Qarshi
UZT (UTC+5)	Davronov 19'; Rahmatov 42'	Report (in Uzbek)	Shulaia 64'	Attendance: 2241

17 March 2024 6	Bunyodkor	2–2	Navbahor	Bunyodkor
UZT (UTC+5)	Mirahmadov 60'; Mirahmadov 90+6'	Report (in Uzbek)	Tabatadze 60'; Tabatadze 73'	Attendance: 1511

17 March 2024 7	AGMK	3–1	Dinamo	OKMK
18.45 UZT (UTC+5)	Škrbić 13'; Sardor Rahmonov 66'; Abdurazzoqov 85'	Report (in Uzbek)	Kojo 63'	Attendance: 551; Referee: Ibrohim Ismoilov

=== Round 4 ===
28 March 2024 1	Dinamo	2–1	Metallurg	Soʻgʻdiyona
19.00 UZT (UTC+5)	Hojimirzayev 72'; Halilov 72'	Report (in Uzbek)	Abduraimov 28'	Attendance: 981

29 March 2024 2	AGMK	1–0	Bunyodkor	OKMK
19.00 UZT (UTC+5)	Sentoku 84'	Report (in Uzbek)		Attendance: 845

29 March 2024 3	Qizilqum	0–0	Lokomotiv	Qarshi
19.15 UZT (UTC+5)		Report (in Uzbek)		Attendance: 429

30 March 2024 4	Andijon	1–1	Nasaf	Qarshi
19.00 UZT (UTC+5)	Mamatkazin 33'	Report (in Uzbek)	Marušić 10'	Attendance: 14861

30 March 2024 5	Paxtakor	2–3	Soʻgʻdiyona	Paxtakor
19.00 UZT (UTC+5)	Abdumannopov 11'; Xolmatov 45+2'	Report (in Uzbek)	Abdurahmonov 23'; Abdurahmonov 33'; Abdurahmonov 52'	Attendance: 556

31 March 2024 6	Olimpik	1–0	Neftchi	Jar
19.00 UZT (UTC+5)	Odilov 90+2'	Report (in Uzbek)		Attendance: 2344; Referee: Ilgiz Tantashev

31 March 2024 7	Navbahor	2–2	Surxon	Namangan
19.00 UZT (UTC+5)	Ahmedov 49'; Tabatadze 90+5'	Report (in Uzbek)	Hamidjonov 23'; Abdusalomov 32'	Attendance: 9857

=== Round 5 ===
4 April 2024 1	Lokomotiv	1–2	Andijon	Lokomotiv
19.15 UZT (UTC+5)	Abdunabiyev 85'	Report (in Uzbek)	Mamatkazin 55'; Samiyev 70'	Attendance: 837

5 April 2024 2	Soʻgʻdiyona	1–0	Qizilqum	Soʻgʻdiyona
19.15 UZT (UTC+5)	Mavlonqulov 38'	Report (in Uzbek)		Attendance: 1124; Referee: Abdurashid Xudoyberganov

5 April 2024 3	Bunyodkor	0–0	Dinamo	Toshkent
19.15 UZT (UTC+5)		Report (in Uzbek)		Stadium: Bunyodkor Stadium; Attendance: 1436; Referee: Gʻayrat Joʻrayev

6 April 2024 4	Surxon	2–1	AGMK	Toshkent
19.15 UZT (UTC+5)	Hamidjonov 46'; Karimov 56'	Report (in Uzbek)	Xolmurodov 90+5'	Stadium: Paxtakor markaziy stadioni Attendance: 421; Referee: Rustam Lutfullin

30 June 2024 5	Metallurg	1–4	Olimpik	Olmaliq
20.00 UZT (UTC+5)	Milićković 19'	Report (in Uzbek)	Ibrohimov 6'; Joʻraqoʻziyev 10'; Ibrohimov 31', 57'	Stadium: OKMK SM stadioni Attendance: 265; Referee: Firdavs Norsafarov

30 June 2024 6	Nasaf	3–2	Navbahor	Qarshi
20.00 UZT (UTC+5)	Abduxoliqov 9'; Nasrullayev 34'; Neʼmatov 65'	Report (in Uzbek)	Nikabadze 4'; Sayfiyev 13'	Stadium: Qarshi; Attendance: 7494

1 July 2024 7	Neftchi	0–2	Paxtakor	Fargʻona
19.30 UZT (UTC+5)		Report (in Uzbek)	Hamdamov 16'; Abdumannopov 40'	Stadium: Istiqlol; Attendance: 14785; Referee: Asker Najafaliyev

=== Round 6 ===
4 May 2024 1	Andijon	0–1	Soʻgʻdiyona	Bobur
18.30 UZT (UTC+5)		Report (in Uzbek)	Doriyev 65'	Attendance: 18012; Referee: [[]]

5 May 2024 2	Navbahor	4–0	Lokomotiv	Namangan
18.00 UZT (UTC+5)	Boltaboyev 29'; Hamrobekov 50'; Đokić 62'; Nazari 90'	Report (in Uzbek)		Attendance: 7250; Referee: [[]]

5 May 2024 3	Bunyodkor	0–2	Surxon	Bunyodkor
18.30 UZT (UTC+5)		Report (in Uzbek)	Abdurahmonov 3'; Abdurahmonov 31'	Attendance: 1200; Referee: Gʻayrat Joʻrayev

6 May 2024 4	Qizilqum	1–1	Neftchi	Qarshi
18.00 UZT (UTC+5)	Joʻrabekov 90+3'	Report (in Uzbek)	Norxonov 23'	Attendance: 320; Referee: Ilgiz Tantashev

7 May 2024 5	Paxtakor	4–3	Metallurg	Paxtakor
18.00 UZT (UTC+5)	Asqarov 8'; Merk 15'; Merk 39'; Dragan Ćeran 84'	Report (in Uzbek)	Otaxonov 31'; Milićković 60'; Sharipov 90+5'	Attendance: 2245; Referee: [[]]

7 May 2024 6	AGMK	3–4	Nasaf	OKMK
19.00 UZT (UTC+5)	Rahmonov 22'; Abdurahmonov 78'; Oʻlmasaliyev 90+3'	Report (in Uzbek)	Mozgovoy 27'; Marušić 45'; Marušić 60'; Jigauri 67'	Attendance: 1347; Referee: [[]]

13 June 2024 7	Dinamo	0–1	Olimpik	Soʻgʻdiyona
20.00 UZT (UTC+5)		Report (in Uzbek)	Ibrohimov 90+1'	Attendance: 721; Referee: [[]]

=== Round 7 ===
11 May 2024 1	Olimpik	1–2	Paxtakor	Jar
19.00 UZT (UTC+5)	Bozorov 88'	Report (in Uzbek)	Hamdamov 79'; Usmonov 90'	Attendance: 4555; Referee: Rustam Lutfullin

11 May 2024 2	Metallurg	0–0	Qizilqum	AGMK
19.00 UZT (UTC+5)		Report (in Uzbek)		Attendance: 538; Referee: Firdavs Norsafarov

12 May 2024 3	Soʻgʻdiyona	1–2	Navbahor	Soʻgʻdiyona
19.00 UZT (UTC+5)	Doriyev 79'	Report (in Uzbek)	Tabatadze 22'; Iskanderov 51'	Attendance: 3750; Referee: Rustam Lutfullin

12 May 2024 4	Neftchi	2–2	Andijon	Fargʻona
19.00 UZT (UTC+5)	Toshmirzayev 84'; Jaloliddinov 90+4'	Report (in Uzbek)	Abdumannonov 16'; Sohibjonov 53'	Stadium: Istiqlol; Attendance: 19867; Referee: Aziz Asimov

13 May 2024 5	Nasaf	0–0	Bunyodkor	Qarshi
19.00 UZT (UTC+5)		Report (in Uzbek)		Attendance: 4463; Referee: [[]]

13 May 2024 6	Surxon	1–1	Dinamo	Paxtakor stadioni
19.00 UZT (UTC+5)	Hoshimov 49'	Report (in Uzbek)	Xojimirzayev 90+11'	Attendance: 589; Referee: Sardor Ismatullayev

14 May 2024 7	Lokomotiv	0–2	AGMK	Lokomotiv
19.00 UZT (UTC+5)		Report (in Uzbek)	Qosimov 84'; Gʻiyosov 88'	Attendance: 898; Referee: Ravshan Abduvohidov

=== Round 8 ===
18 May 2024 1	Andijon	1–1	Metallurg	Bobur
19.00 UZT (UTC+5)	Bubanja 75'	Report (in Uzbek)	Sharipov 68'	Attendance: 19095; Referee: [[]]

18 May 2024 2	Qizilqum	2–4	Olimpik	Qarshi
19.00 UZT (UTC+5)	Jumanqoʻziyev 13'; Kukhianidze 83'	Report (in Uzbek)	Muqimjonov 53'; Joʻraqoʻziyev 56'; Odilov 69'; Bozorov 88'	Attendance: 425; Referee: Toʻrabek Suyunov

19 May 2024 3	Navbahor	1–0	Neftchi	Namangan
19.00 UZT (UTC+5)	Ivanović 90+4'	Report (in Uzbek)		Attendance: 22350; Referee: Aziz Asimov

19 May 2024 4	AGMK	5–3	Soʻgʻdiyona	OKMK
19.00 UZT (UTC+5)	Kulmatov 10'; Gʻiyosov 15'; Abdurahmonov 75'; Abdurahmonov 84'; Rukhadze 90+10'	Report (in Uzbek)	Doriyev 21'; Petrović 41'; Doriyev 72'	Attendance: 655

20 May 2024 5	Surxon	0–1	Nasaf	Paxtakor
19.00 UZT (UTC+5)		Report (in Uzbek)	Marušić 21'	Attendance: 1327; Referee: [[]]

20 May 2024 6	Dinamo	1–1	Paxtakor	Soʻgʻdiyona
19.00 UZT (UTC+5)	Kojo 85'	Report (in Uzbek)	Dragan Ćeran 16'	Attendance: 1336; Referee: [[]]

21 May 2024 7	Bunyodkor	3–2	Lokomotiv	Bunyodkor
19.00 UZT (UTC+5)	Muhammadjonov 59'; Ismonaliyev 73'; Mirahmadov 90+8'	Report (in Uzbek)	Tursunov 34'; Komilov 90'	Attendance: 2011

=== Round 9 ===
24 May 2024 1	Metallurg	1–1	Navbahor	OKMK
19.00 UZT (UTC+5)	Shayqulov 78'	Report (in Uzbek)	Tabatadze 15'	Attendance: 3120

24 May 2024 2	Olimpik	0–0	Andijon	Jar
19.30 UZT (UTC+5)		Report (in Uzbek)		Attendance: 1533

25 May 2024 3	Navbahor	1–1	Dinamo	Qarshi
19.00 UZT (UTC+5)	Mozgovoy 25'	Report (in Uzbek)	Mijić 60'	Attendance: 7011

25 May 2024 4	Paxtakor	1–1	Qizilqum	Paxtakor
19.00 UZT (UTC+5)	Hamdamov 51'	Report (in Uzbek)	Lobjanidze 45+5'	Attendance: 987

26 May 2024 5	Neftchi	1–0	AGMK	Istiqlol
19.00 UZT (UTC+5)	Jaloliddinov 53'	Report (in Uzbek)		Attendance: 15120

26 May 2024 6	Soʻgʻdiyona	4–0	Bunyodkor	Soʻgʻdiyona
19.00 UZT (UTC+5)	Doriyev 11', 39', 42'; Soyibov 75'	Report (in Uzbek)		Attendance: 2545

27 May 2024 7	Lokomotiv	1–1	Surxon	Lokomotiv
19.00 UZT (UTC+5)	Abdurashidov 75'	Report (in Uzbek)	Ismoilov 12'	Attendance: 698

=== Round 10 ===
30 May 2024 1	Dinamo	2–0	Qizilqum	Soʻgʻdiyona
19.00 UZT (UTC+5)	Kojo 14'; Hojimirzayev 45+6'	Report (in Uzbek)		Attendance: 1510

30 May 2024 2	Navbahor	0–0	Olimpik	Namangan
19.30 UZT (UTC+5)		Report (in Uzbek)		Attendance: 8591

31 May 2024 3	Surxon	1–0	Soʻgʻdiyona	Paxtakor
19.00 UZT (UTC+5)	Shaydulov 68'	Report (in Uzbek)		Attendance: 567

31 May 2024 4	AGMK	1–0	Metallurg	OKMK
19.00 UZT (UTC+5)	Xolmurodov 45'	Report (in Uzbek)		Attendance: 2326

1 June 2024 5	Bunyodkor	0–3	Neftchi	Bunyodkor
19.00 UZT (UTC+5)		Report (in Uzbek)	Effiong 25', 31'; Norchayev 90'	Attendance: 3654

2 June 2024 6	Andijon	1–3	Paxtakor	Bobur
19.00 UZT (UTC+5)	Bubanya 54'	Report (in Uzbek)	Usmonov 4'; Haamdamov 30'; Ćeran 88'	Attendance: 17152

2 June 2024 7	Nasaf	3–0	Lokomotiv	Qarshi
19.00 UZT (UTC+5)	Abduholiqov 49'; Abduholiqov 68'; Abduholiqov 82'	Report (in Uzbek)		Attendance: 3505

=== Round 11 ===
14 June 2024 1	Metallurg	0–0	Bunyodkor	AGMK
20.00 UZT (UTC+5)		Report (in Uzbek)		Attendance: 210

15 June 2024 2	Qizilqum	3–3	Andijon	Qarshi
20.00 UZT (UTC+5)	Shulaia 3', 90+3'; Lobjanidze 41'	Report (in Uzbek)	Turdimurodov 44', 78'; Arveladze 90+8'	Attendance: 402

15 June 2024 3	Neftchi	1–1	Surxon	Istiqlol
20.00 UZT (UTC+5)	Norchayev 28'	Report (in Uzbek)	Hamidjonov 38'	Attendance: 10200

16 June 2024 4	Paxtakor	0–0	Navbahor	Paxtakor
20.00 UZT (UTC+5)		Report (in Uzbek)		Attendance: 3751

16 June 2024 5	Soʻgʻdiyona	1–0	Nasaf	Soʻgʻdiyona
20.00 UZT (UTC+5)	Doriyev 18'	Report (in Uzbek)		Attendance: 2988

17 June 2024 6	Lokomotiv	0–2	Dinamo	Lokomotiv
20.00 UZT (UTC+5)		Report (in Uzbek)	Abdullayev 15'; Hojimirzayev 37'	Attendance: 721; Referee: Akobirxoʻja Shukurullayev

17 June 2024 7	Olimpik	0–1	AGMK	Jar
20.00 UZT (UTC+5)		Report (in Uzbek)	Gʻiyosov 82'	Attendance: 635

=== Round 12 ===
19 June 2024 1	Surxon	2–1	Metallurg	Paxtakor
20.00 UZT (UTC+5)	Abdusalomov 86'; Abdusalomov 90+1'	Report (in Uzbek)	Ubaydullayev 22'	Attendance: 428

20 June 2024 2	Navbahor	0–0	Qizilqum	Namangan
20.00 UZT (UTC+5)		Report (in Uzbek)		Attendance: 5186

20 June 2024 3	Nasaf	1–0	Neftchi	Qarshi
20.00 UZT (UTC+5)	Ubaydullayev 45+1'	Report (in Uzbek)		Attendance: 7456

21 June 2024 4	AGMK	4–2	Paxtakor	OKMK
20.00 UZT (UTC+5)	Sentoku 34'; Gʻiyosov 79'; Rukhadze 90+6'; Papava 90+1'	Report (in Uzbek)	Ćeran 14'; Abdumajidov 45+3'	Attendance: 2078

21 June 2024 5	Bunyodkor	1–1	Olimpik	Bunyodkor
20.00 UZT (UTC+5)	Abduxoliqov 25'	Report (in Uzbek)	Rahimjonov 59'	Attendance: 707

22 June 2024 6	Dinamo	1–1	Andijon	Dinamo
20.00 UZT (UTC+5)	Hojimirzayev 37'	Report (in Uzbek)	Abdumannonov 69'	Attendance: 10102

22 June 2024 7	Lokomotiv	1–2	Soʻgʻdiyona	Lokomotiv
20.00 UZT (UTC+5)	Rogač 61'	Report (in Uzbek)	Zoteyev 52'; Abdurahmonov 71'	Attendance: 837

=== Round 13 ===
25 June 2024 1	Olimpik	2–0	Surxon	Jar
20.00 UZT (UTC+5)	Toirov 29'; Islomov 90'	Report (in Uzbek)		Attendance: 1235

26 June 2024 2	Andijon	3–0	Navbahor	Bobur
20.00 UZT (UTC+5)	Arveladze 13'; Turdimurodov 62'; Yoʻldoshev 84'	Report (in Uzbek)		Attendance: 17873

26 June 2024 3	Metallurg	0–0	Nasaf	AGMK
20.00 UZT (UTC+5)		Report (in Uzbek)		Attendance: 789

27 June 2024 4	Paxtakor	1–0	Bunyodkor	Paxtakor
20.00 UZT (UTC+5)	Ćeran 8'	Report (in Uzbek)		Attendance: 1258

27 June 2024 5	Neftchi	1–1	Lokomotiv	Istiqlol
20.00 UZT (UTC+5)	Norchayev 49'	Report (in Uzbek)	Abdunabiyev 74'	Attendance: 10922

28 June 2024 6	Qizilqum	1–0	AGMK	Qarshi
20.00 UZT (UTC+5)	Lobjanidze 84'	Report (in Uzbek)		Attendance: 1353

28 June 2024 7	Soʻgʻdiyona	4–2	Dinamo	Soʻgʻdiyona
20.00 UZT (UTC+5)	Jovović 9'; Abdurahmonov 18'; Mustafoqulov 65'; Sindarov 90+5'	Report (in Uzbek)	Ratinho 45'; Shoahmedov 53'	Attendance: 4862

=== Round 14 ===
2 August 2024 1	Qizilqum	1–0	Bunyodkor	Qarshi
19.45 UZT (UTC+5)	Gʻiyosov 57'	Report (in Uzbek)		Attendance: 310

3 August 2024 2	Andijon	2–3	AGMK	Bobur
19.45 UZT (UTC+5)	Abdugʻaniyev 35'; Arveladze 41'	Report (in Uzbek)	Daci 43'; Daci 66'; Sánchez 79'	Attendance: 13520

4 August 2024 3	Metallurg	1–1	Lokomotiv	OKMK
19.45 UZT (UTC+5)	Milićković 27'	Report (in Uzbek)	Kichin 57'	Attendance: 286

20 August 2024 4	Neftchi	0–3	Soʻgʻdiyona	Istiqlol
19.30 UZT (UTC+5)		Report (in Uzbek)	Zoteyev 23'; Jovović 66'; Hoshimov 86'	Attendance: 6436

20 August 2024 5	Olimpik	0–2	Nasaf	Jar
20.00 UZT (UTC+5)		Report (in Uzbek)	Abduxoliqov 66'; Jigauri 90+6'	Attendance: 3277

22 August 2024 6	Paxtakor	2–1	Surxon	Jar
19.00 UZT (UTC+5)		Report (in Uzbek)	Abdusalomov 23'	Attendance: 3381

12 October 2024 7	Dinamo	1–0	Navbahor	Istiqlol
19.00 UZT (UTC+5)	Mirsaidov 7'	Report (in Uzbek)		Attendance: 6050

=== Round 15 ===
9 August 2024 1	Lokomotiv	1–1	Olimpik	Bunyodkor Stadium
19.00 UZT (UTC+5)	Hakimov 16'	Report (in Uzbek)	Abdullajonov 88'	Attendance: 798

10 August 2024 2	Neftchi	3–2	Dinamo	Istiqlol
19.00 UZT (UTC+5)	Safarov 27'; Norxonov 61'; Toshmirzayev 90+5'	Report (in Uzbek)	Kojo 33'; Halilov 90+8'	Attendance: 4233

10 August 2024 3	Nasaf	1–0	Paxtakor	Qarshi
20.00 UZT (UTC+5)	Sidiqov 63'	Report (in Uzbek)		Attendance: 8729; Referee: Sultonmurod Abdurahmonov

11 August 2024 4	Soʻgʻdiyona	2–2	Metallurg	Soʻgʻdiyona
19.00 UZT (UTC+5)	Doriyev 23'; Qobilov 42'	Report (in Uzbek)	Sekulić 38'; Pirmuhamedov 74'	Attendance: 1457; Referee: Akmal Rahimov

11 August 2024 5	Bunyodkor	0–2	Andijon	Bunyodkor
20.00 UZT (UTC+5)		Report (in Uzbek)	Olimjonov 47'; Yoʻldoshev 82' (o.g.)	Attendance: 1358

12 August 2024 6	AGMK	0–1	Navbahor	OKMK SM
19.00 UZT (UTC+5)	Daci 18'; Klepač 90+8'	Report (in Uzbek)	Ivanović 74'	Attendance: 4471

12 August 2024 7	Surxon	0–1	Qizilqum	Dinamo
20.00 UZT (UTC+5)		Report (in Uzbek)	Pletnyov 62'	Attendance: 547

=== Round 16 ===
15 August 2024 1	Metallurg	0–0	Neftchi	OKMK
18.00 UZT (UTC+5)		Report (in Uzbek)		Attendance: 489

15 August 2024 2	Olimpik	0–1	Soʻgʻdiyona	Jar
20.15 UZT (UTC+5)		Report (in Uzbek)	Jovović 64'	Attendance: 468; Referee: Nikita Mustafin

16 August 2024 3	Dinamo	3–2	AGMK	Dinamo
19.00 UZT (UTC+5)	Ratinho 35'; Kojo 68'; Halilov 90+6'	Report (in Uzbek)	Gʻiyosov 18'; Sánchez 49'	Attendance: 7509

16 August 2024 4	Qizilqum	0–1	Nasaf	Qarshi
20.00 UZT (UTC+5)		Report (in Uzbek)	Bozorov 87'	Attendance: 4201

18 August 2024 5	Andijon	2–3	Surxon	Bobur arena
19.00 UZT (UTC+5)	Turdimurodov 71'; Bubanja 76'	Report (in Uzbek)	Tursunov 23'; Haydarov 60'; Hamidjonov 80'	Attendance: 7852

18 August 2024 6	Paxtakor	3–1	Lokomotiv	Jar
20.15 UZT (UTC+5)	Abdumannopov 16'; Ćeran 19'; Abdumannopov 65'	Report (in Uzbek)	Abdunabiyev 81'	Attendance: 1465

19 August 2024 7	Navbahor	2–2	Bunyodkor	Namangan
19.30 UZT (UTC+5)	Iskanderov 18'; Iskanderov 90+12'	Report (in Uzbek)	Filipović 9'; Abduxoliqov 60'	Attendance: 4852

=== Round 17 ===
23 August 2024 1	Metallurg	0–1	Dinamo	OKMK
18.00 UZT (UTC+5)		Report (in Uzbek)	Hojimirzayev 45+1'	Attendance: 456

24 August 2024 2	Neftchi	3–0	Olimpik	Istiqlol
20.15 UZT (UTC+5)	Effiong 13'; Amonov 71'; Amonov 77'	Report (in Uzbek)		Attendance: 3252

25 August 2024 3	Lokomotiv	4–2	Qizilqum	Doʻstlik
19.00 UZT (UTC+5)	Hakimov 11'; Shodiboyev 15'; Abdunabiyev 18'; Gashchenkov 21'	Report (in Uzbek)	Lobjanidze 35'; Lobjanidze 54'	Attendance: 117

25 August 2024 4	Nasaf	3–0	Andijon	Qarshi
20.00 UZT (UTC+5)	Jighauri 3'; Marušić 22'; Marušić 68'	Report (in Uzbek)		Attendance: 6282

26 August 2024 5	Soʻgʻdiyona	0–1	Paxtakor	Soʻgʻdiyona
19.00 UZT (UTC+5)		Report (in Uzbek)	Izzatov 67'	Attendance: 4002

26 August 2024 6	Surxon	0–1	Navbahor	Dinamo
20.15 UZT (UTC+5)		Report (in Uzbek)	Nazari 18'	Attendance: 1036

13 September 2024 7	Bunyodkor	0–1	AGMK	Doʻstlik
19.00 UZT (UTC+5)		Report (in Uzbek)	Oʻlmasaliyev 86'	Attendance: 571

=== Round 18 ===
13 September 2024 1	Qizilqum	1–1	Soʻgʻdiyona	Qarshi
18.15 UZT (UTC+5)	Gʻiyosov 76'	Report (in Uzbek)	Zoteyev 90+3'	Attendance: 313

13 September 2024 2	Paxtakor	0–0	Neftchi	Jar
19.30 UZT (UTC+5)		Report (in Uzbek)		Attendance: 2442

14 September 2024 3	Dinamo	2–3	Bunyodkor	Dinamo
19.30 UZT (UTC+5)	Hojimirzayev 31'; Hojimirzayev 69'	Report (in Uzbek)	Filipović 50'; Normurodov 59'; Filipović 71'	Attendance: 4781

14 September 2024 4	Navbahor	0–1	Nasaf	Namangan
19.30 UZT (UTC+5)		Report (in Uzbek)	Jighauri 56'	Attendance: 8930

15 September 2024 5	Andijon	1–2	Lokomotiv	Bobur
19.30 UZT (UTC+5)	Sohibjonov 70'	Report (in Uzbek)	Xolnazarov 46'; Rogač 90+5'	Attendance: 9762; Referee: Shavkat Nasibullayev

16 September 2024 6	Olimpik	1–1	Metallurg	Doʻstlik
19.30 UZT (UTC+5)	Milićković 45+3'	Report (in Uzbek)	Bozorov 90+1'	Attendance: 112

16 September 2024 7	AGMK	1–0	Surxon	OKMK
19.30 UZT (UTC+5)	Rustamov 88'	Report (in Uzbek)		Attendance: 3725

=== Round 19 ===
19 September 2024 1	Neftchi	2–2	Qizilqum	Oʻzbekiston
18.15 UZT (UTC+5)	Toshmirzayev 11'; Qahramonov 21'	Report (in Uzbek)	Shukrillayev 27'; Lobjanidze 70'	Attendance: 4056

20 September 2024 2	Lokomotiv	0–1	Navbahor	Doʻstlik
19.30 UZT (UTC+5)		Report (in Uzbek)	Tojiddinov 79'	Attendance: 328

20 September 2024 3	Soʻgʻdiyona	1–1	Andijon	Soʻgʻdiyona
19.30 UZT (UTC+5)	Mavlonqulov 24'	Report (in Uzbek)	Turdimurodov 55'	Attendance: 4028

21 September 2024 4	Metallurg	3–2	Paxtakor	OKMK
19.30 UZT (UTC+5)	Sattorov 66'; Oʻrinboyev 72'; Milićković 90+8'	Report (in Uzbek)	Ćeran 4'; Abdullayev 90+2'	Attendance: 421

21 September 2024 5	Olimpik	0–3	Dinamo	Jar
19.30 UZT (UTC+5)		Report (in Uzbek)	Kojo 52'; Halilov 69'; Toirov 89'	Attendance: 322

22 September 2024 6	Surxon	0–1	Bunyodkor	Dinamo
19.30 UZT (UTC+5)		Report (in Uzbek)	Normurodov 34'	Attendance: 230

23 September 2024 7	Nasaf	2–0	AGMK	Qarshi
19.30 UZT (UTC+5)	Siddiqov 9'; Siddiqov 42'	Report (in Uzbek)		Attendance: 15860

=== Round 20 ===
25 September 2024 1	Paxtakor	6–0	Olimpik	Oʻzbekiston
17.25 UZT (UTC+5)	Adhamzoda 29'; Ćeran 31'; Hoshimov 37'; Hamroliyev 46'; Abdirasulov 68'; Usmonov 83'	Report (in Uzbek)		Attendance: 4056

25 September 2024 2	Andijon	0–0	Neftchi	Doʻstlik
20.30 UZT (UTC+5)		Report (in Uzbek)		Attendance: 328

26 September 2024 3	Dinamo	3–0	Surxon	Soʻgʻdiyona
18.30 UZT (UTC+5)	Hojimirzayev 55'; Xislat Halilov 82'; Mustafoyev 90+1'	Report (in Uzbek)		Attendance: 4028

26 September 2024 4	Navbahor	0–3	Soʻgʻdiyona	OKMK
18.30 UZT (UTC+5)		Report (in Uzbek)	Jovović 49'; Jovović 51'; Jovović 69'	Attendance: 421

27 September 2024 5	Qizilqum	1–0	Metallurg	Jar
19.15 UZT (UTC+5)	Lobjanidze 2'	Report (in Uzbek)		Attendance: 322

27 September 2024 6	AGMK	1–0	Lokomotiv	Dinamo
19.30 UZT (UTC+5)	Sánchez 70'	Report (in Uzbek)		Attendance: 230

28 September 2024 7	Bunyodkor	2–2	Nasaf	Qarshi
17.00 UZT (UTC+5)	Ismonaliyev 65'; Kaçorri 77'	Report (in Uzbek)	Marušić 47'; Stanojević 63'	Attendance: 15860

=== Round 21 ===
6 October 2024 1	Paxtakor	4–2	Dinamo	Jar
14.00 UZT (UTC+5)	Ćeran 9'; Ćeran 42'; Ćeran 72'; Xolmatov 90+5'	Report (in Uzbek)	Douglas 18'; Mijic 55'	Attendance: 214

18 October 2024 2	Nasaf	1–1	Surxon	Qarshi
18.00 UZT (UTC+5)	Marušić 17'	Report (in Uzbek)	Haydarov 62'	Attendance: 328

19 October 2024 3	Lokomotiv	2–3	Bunyodkor	Doʻstlik
15.00 UZT (UTC+5)	Kichin 13'; Kichin 38'	Report (in Uzbek)	Filipović 25'; Muqimjonov 67'; Kaçorri 86'	Attendance: 1366

19 October 2024 4	Metallurg	0–0	Andijon	OKMK
17.00 UZT (UTC+5)		Report (in Uzbek)		Attendance: 523

20 October 2024 5	Neftchi	2–2	Navbahor	Istiqlol
15.00 UZT (UTC+5)	Gʻofurov 3'; Qodirqulov 90'	Report (in Uzbek)	Tabatadze 80'; Ahmedov 90+6'	Attendance: 8411

20 October 2024 6	Olimpik	1–0	Qizilqum	Jar
17.00 UZT (UTC+5)	Abdullajonov 45+2'	Report (in Uzbek)		Attendance: 1024

21 October 2024 7	Soʻgʻdiyona	1–1	AGMK	Soʻgʻdiyona
18.00 UZT (UTC+5)	Toʻxtaxoʻjayev 88'	Report (in Uzbek)	Sanchez 11'	Attendance: 4522

=== Round 22 ===
25 October 2024 1	Surxon	2–1	Lokomotiv	Dinamo
14.00 UZT (UTC+5)	Abdusalomov 70'; Haydarov 77'	Report (in Uzbek)	Abdurashidov 40'	Attendance: 214

25 October 2024 2	Navbahor	1–0	Metallurg	Namangan
18.00 UZT (UTC+5)	Đokić 80'	Report (in Uzbek)		Attendance: 328

26 October 2024 3	Qizilqum	2–0	Paxtakor	Qarshi
15.00 UZT (UTC+5)	Lobjanidze 10'; Gʻiyosov 85'	Report (in Uzbek)		Attendance: 1366

26 October 2024 4	Andijon	1–0	Olimpik	Bobur
17.00 UZT (UTC+5)	Komilov 85'	Report (in Uzbek)		Attendance: 523

27 October 2024 5	Bunyodkor	1–1	Soʻgʻdiyona	Bunyodkor
15.00 UZT (UTC+5)	Kaçorri 71'	Report (in Uzbek)	Mavlonqulov 88'	Attendance: 8411

28 October 2024 6	AGMK	1–2	Neftchi	AGMK
17.00 UZT (UTC+5)	Ahmadaliyev 90+2'	Report (in Uzbek)	Gʻofurov 14'; Effiong 81'	Attendance: 1024

28 October 2024 7	Dinamo	1–2	Nasaf	Dinamo
18.00 UZT (UTC+5)	Halilov 55'	Report (in Uzbek)	Rahmatov 88'; Neʼmatov 90+10'	Attendance: 4522

=== Round 23 ===
31 October 2024 1	Paxtakor	3–1	Andijon	Jar
18.15 UZT (UTC+5)	Hoshimov 15'; Oʻrinboyev 61'; Merk 90+4'	Report (in Uzbek)	Abdumannonov 35'	Attendance: 214

1 November 2024 2	Lokomotiv	1–0	Nasaf	Doʻstlik
16.00 UZT (UTC+5)	Mozgovoy 73'	Report (in Uzbek)		Attendance: 328

1 November 2024 3	Soʻgʻdiyona	2–4	Surxon	Soʻgʻdiyona
18.15 UZT (UTC+5)	Jovović 9'; Doriyev 24'	Report (in Uzbek)	Haydarov 62'; Haydarov 68'; Haydarov 77'; Jahongirbek Abdusalomov 80'	Attendance: 1366

2 November 2024 4	Olimpik	1–2	Navbahor	Jar
15.00 UZT (UTC+5)	Muxtorov 35'	Report (in Uzbek)	Boltaboyev 19'; Boltaboyev 72'	Attendance: 523

2 November 2024 5	Qizilqum	1–2	Dinamo	Qarshi
17.15 UZT (UTC+5)	Hojimirzayev 11'	Report (in Uzbek)	Muhammadali Gʻiyosov 24'; Vahobov 48'	Attendance: 8411

3 November 2024 6	Neftchi	2–1	Bunyodkor	Istiqlol
16.00 UZT (UTC+5)	Effiong 59'; Gʻofurov 85'	Report (in Uzbek)	Karimov 88'	Attendance: 1024

3 November 2024 7	Metallurg	1–1	AGMK	OKMK
18.15 UZT (UTC+5)	Toshqoʻziyev 79'	Report (in Uzbek)	Abdurazzoqov 34'	Attendance: 4522

=== Round 24 ===
7 November 2024 1	AGMK	2–2	Olimpik	OKMK SM
16.00 UZT (UTC+5)	Abdurazzoqov 28'; Toʻxtaxoʻjayev 84'	Report (in Uzbek)	Muxtorov 53'; Islomov 82'	Attendance: 214

7 November 2024 2	Dinamo	1–2	Lokomotiv	Dinamo
18.15 UZT (UTC+5)	Halilov 58'	Report (in Uzbek)	Gashchenkov 85'; Hakimov 90+11'	Attendance: 328

8 November 2024 3	Bunyodkor	1–1	Metallurg	Bunyodkor
18.15 UZT (UTC+5)	Toʻraqulov 41'	Report (in Uzbek)	Abdumajidov 69'	Attendance: 1366

9 November 2024 4	Navbahor	5–2	Paxtakor	Namangan
16.00 UZT (UTC+5)	Nazari 3'; Nazari 43'; Iskanderov 62'; Nikabadze 90+2'; Iskanderov 90+6'	Report (in Uzbek)	Joʻraqoʻziyev 36'; Joʻraqoʻziyev 46'	Attendance: 523

9 November 2024 5	Nasaf	0–1	Soʻgʻdiyona	Qarshi
17.00 UZT (UTC+5)		Report (in Uzbek)	Andreyev 90+1'	Attendance: 8411

9 November 2024 6	Surxon	0–0	Neftchi	Dinamo
18.15 UZT (UTC+5)		Report (in Uzbek)		Attendance: 1024

10 November 2024 7	Andijon	0–0	Qizilqum	Bobur
17.00 UZT (UTC+5)		Report (in Uzbek)		Attendance: 4522

=== Round 25 ===
21 November 2024 1	Paxtakor	0–2	AGMK	Jar
UZT (UTC+5)		Report (in Uzbek)	Abdurazzoqov 31'; Sentoku 85'	Attendance: 1146

22 November 2024 2	Neftchi	2–0	Nasaf	Istiqlol
UZT (UTC+5)	Toshmirzayev 58'; Norchayev 90+6'	Report (in Uzbek)		Attendance: 5551

22 November 2024 3	Qizilqum	1–5	Navbahor	Qarshi
UZT (UTC+5)	Bozorov 62'	Report (in Uzbek)	Iskanderov 45'; Nazari 57'; Đokić 69'; Tabatadze 87'; Mirsaidov 90'	Attendance: 263

23 November 2024 4	Olimpik	0–1	Bunyodkor	Jar
UZT (UTC+5)		Report (in Uzbek)	Yoʻldashov 61'	Attendance: 403

23 November 2024 5	Andijon	3–0	Dinamo	Bobur
UZT (UTC+5)	Turdimurodov 19'; Abdumannonov 40'; Samiyev 90+7'	Report (in Uzbek)		Attendance: 5845

24 November 2024 6	Metallurg	1–0	Surxon	OKMK
UZT (UTC+5)	Kucherenko 52'	Report (in Uzbek)		Attendance: 334; Referee: Ahrol Risqullayev

24 November 2024 7	Soʻgʻdiyona	2–0	Lokomotiv	Soʻgʻdiyona
UZT (UTC+5)	Doriyev 72'; Jovović 87'	Report (in Uzbek)		Attendance: 3624

=== Round 26 ===
30 November 2024 1	Bunyodkor	2–0	Paxtakor	Bunyodkor
15.00 UZT (UTC+5)	Filipović 35'; Raso 79'	Report (in Uzbek)		Attendance: 764

30 November 2024 2	Navbahor	3–3	Andijon	Namangan
15.00 UZT (UTC+5)	Iskanderov 53'; Đokić 58'; Ruslanbek Jiyanov 90+7'	Report (in Uzbek)	Azimov 45+1'; Turdimurodov 60'; Mamatkazin 71'	Attendance: 7500

30 November 2024 3	AGMK	1–0	Qizilqum	OKMK
15.00 UZT (UTC+5)	Rustamov 78'	Report (in Uzbek)		Attendance: 1022

30 November 2024 4	Surxon	3–0	Olimpik	Jar
15.00 UZT (UTC+5)	Abdurahmonov 35'; Shaydulov 61'; Haydarov 90+3'	Report (in Uzbek)		Attendance: 234

30 November 2024 5	Nasaf	1–2	Metallurg	Qarshi
15.00 UZT (UTC+5)	Nasrullayev 45+2'	Report (in Uzbek)	Milićković 45+9'; Sharipov 54'	Attendance: 1711

30 November 2024 6	Lokomotiv	2–3	Neftchi	Doʻstlik
15.00 UZT (UTC+5)	Rogač 12'; Abdunabiyev 30'	Report (in Uzbek)	Gʻulomov 39'; Toshmirzayev 40'; Norchayev 56'	Attendance: 872

30 November 2024 7	Dinamo	1–0	Soʻgʻdiyona	Dinamo
15.00 UZT (UTC+5)	Kojo 78'	Report (in Uzbek)		Attendance: 3115

== Results ==
=== Results table ===
Home \ Away	AGM	AND	BUN	DIN	LOK	MET	NAS	NAV	NEF	OLY	PAK	QIZ	SOG	SUR
AGMK	—	0–0	1–0	3–1	1–0	1–0	3–4	2–1		2–2	4–2		5–3	1–0
Andijon	2–3	—	5–1		1–2	1–1	1–1	3–0	0–0		1–3	0–0	0–1	2–3
Bunyodkor	0–1	2–0	—	0–0	3–2	1–1	2–2	2–2	0–3	1–1		1–3		0–2
Dinamo	3–2	1–1	2–3	—	1–2	2–1		0–1	0–1	0–1	1–1	2–0		3–0
Lokomotiv	0–2	1–2		0–2	—	2–2	0–1	0–1		1–1	3–0	4–2	1–2	1–1
Metallurg	1–1		0–0	0–1	1–1	—	0–0	1–1	0–0	1–4	3–2	0–0	0–0	
Nasaf	2–0	3–0	0–0	1–1	3–0		—	3–2	1–0	2–0	1–0	2–1	0–1	
Navbahor	1–1		2–2	3–1	4–0		0–1	—	1–0	0–0	5–2	0–0	0–3	2–2
Neftchi	1–0	2–2	2–1	3–2	1–1	1–0	2–0		—	3–0	0–2	2–2	0–3	1–1
Olympic	0–1	0–0		0–3	0–1	1–1	0–2	1–2	1–0	—	1–2		0–1	2–0
Pakhtakor	0–2		1–0	4–2	3–1	4–3	0–0	0–0	0–0	6–0	—	1–1	2–3	0–1
Qizilqum	1–0	3–3	1–0	1–2	0–0	1–0	0–1	1–5	1–1	2–4		—	1–1	2–1
Sogdiana		1–1	4–0	4–2		2–2	1–0	1–2	1–2	2–2	0–1	1–0	—	2–4
Surkhon	2–1	2–3	0–1	1–1		2–1	0–1	0–1	0–0		0–3	1–0	1–0	—

Updated to match(es) played on 22 November 2024. Source: Uzbekistan Professional Football League
Legend: Blue = home team win; Yellow = draw; Red = away team win.

=== Results by match played ===
Team ╲ Round	1	2	3	4	5	6	7	8	9	10	11	12	13	14	15	16	17	18	19	20	21
AGMK	D	D	W	W	L	L	W	W	L	W	W	W	L	W	W	L	W	W	L	W	
Andijon	D	W	W	D	W	L	D	D	D	L	D	D	W	L	L	L	L	L	D	D	
Bunyodkor	L	L	D	L	D	L	D	W	L	L	D	D	L	L	W	D	L	W	W	D	
Dinamo	L	L	L	W	D	L	D	D	D	W	W	D	L	L	L	W	W	L	W	W	L
Lokomotiv	D	W	W	D	L	L	L	L	D	L	L	L	D	D	D	L	W	W	L	L	
Metallurg	D	D	L	L	L	L	D	D	D	L	D	L	D	D	D	D	L	D	W	L	
Nasaf	W	D	W	D	W	W	D	W	D	W	L	W	D	W	W	W	W	W	W	D	
Navbahor	W	D	D	D	L	W	W	W	D	D	D	D	L	W	L	D	W	L	W	L	
Neftchi	W	W	W	L	L	D	D	L	W	W	D	L	D	L	W	D	W	D	D	D	
Olympic	L	L	D	W	W	W	L	W	D	D	L	D	W	L	D	L	L	D	L	L	
Pakhtakor	W	D	L	L	W	W	W	D	D	W	D	L	W	L	L	W	W	D	L	W	W
Qizilqum	W	W	L	D	L	D	D	L	D	L	D	D	W	W	L	L	L	D	D	W	
Sogdiana	L	D	D	W	W	W	L	L	W	L	W	W	W	W	D	W	L	D	D	W	
Surkhon	L	L	L	D	W	W	D	L	D	W	D	W	L	W	W	W	L	L	L	L	

Updated to match(es) played on 12 October 2024. Source: Championat.asia
W = Win; D = Draw; L = Loss; P = Postponed

=== Positions by round ===
Team ╲ Round	1	2	3	4	5	6	7	8	9	10	11	12
AGMK	8	9	6	5	5	6	4	3	4	4		2
Andijon	9	3	2	2	1	1	2	4	6	7		
Bunyodkor	11	14	12	14	14	14	14	13	13	13		13
Dinamo	12	11	14	11	11	12	11	12	12	9		12
Lokomotiv	7	7	3	3	3	8	10	10	10	11		11
Metallurg	6	8	10	12	13	13	13	14	14	14		14
Nasaf	4	6	4	4	4	2	3	2	2	1		1
Navbahor	2	5	7	7	8	5	1	1	1	2		
Neftchi	5	2	1	1	2	4	5	6	3	3		
Olympic	13	12	11	10	10	11	12	11	11	12		
Pakhtakor	1	4	8	9	9	9	7	5	7	5		4
Qizilqum	3	1	5	6	7	7	8	8	8	10		10
Sogdiana	10	10	9	8	6	3	6	7	5	6		3
Surkhon	14	13	13	13	12	10	9	9	9	8		

Leader and qualification to AFC Champions League group stage
Qualification to AFC Champions League group stage
Qualification to the AFC Champions League preliminary round
Relegation to Uzbekistan Pro League#Relegation play off
Relegation to Uzbekistan Pro League

Updated to match(es) played on 2 June 2024. Source: Uzbekistan Professional Football League

=== 2024 U19 Championship under Super League results ===
Uzbekistan U19 Championship
- Season: 2024
- Champions: Olimpik U19
- Matches: 235
- Goals: 1,089 (4.63 per match)
- Top goalscorer: Albert Nurullayev (Buxoro, 16)
- Biggest home win: Navbahor U19 8:1 OKMK U19 (21 October 2024)
- Biggest away win: OKMK U19 1:6 Navbahor U19 (28 June 2024)
- Highest scoring: Navbahor U19 8:1 OKMK U19 (21 October 2024)
- Highest attendance: 569 (7 August 2024, Aral U19 2:2 Nasaf U19)

#	Team	Games	Wins	Draw	Losses	Goals for	Goals against	Goal difference	Points
1	Olimpik U19	20	14	3	3	54	20	34	45
2	Nasaf U19	20	13	3	4	38	16	22	42
3	Buxoro U19	20	13	1	6	48	19	29	40
4	Bunyodkor U19	20	12	3	5	46	21	25	39
5	Shoʻrtan U19	20	11	3	6	36	28	8	36
6	Mashʼal U19	20	11	2	7	35	22	13	35
7	Paxtakor U19	20	11	1	8	37	30	7	34
8	Lokomotiv U19	20	10	2	8	35	26	9	32
9	Doʻstlik U19	20	10	2	8	27	28	−1	32
10	Navbahor U19	20	9	3	8	36	26	10	30
11	Metallurg U19	20	9	2	9	37	36	1	29
12	Dinamo U19	20	9	1	10	35	40	−5	28
13	Olimpik MobiUz U19	20	9	0	11	38	43	−5	27
14	Neftchi U19	20	8	1	11	37	49	−12	25
15	Soʻgʻdiyona U19	20	8	1	11	25	42	−17	25
16	Aral U19	20	7	2	11	29	54	−25	23
17	Surxon U19	20	7	1	12	40	46	−6	22
18	Kokand-1912 U19	20	6	4	10	33	43	−10	22
19	Xorazm U19	20	5	4	11	22	36	−14	19
20	Qizilqum U19	20	4	6	10	31	37	−6	18
21	Andijon U19	20	5	3	12	20	42	−22	18
22	OKMK U19	20	4	2	14	33	68	−35	14

=== 2024 U21 Championship under Super League results ===
Uzbekistan U21 Championship
- Season: 2024
- Champions: Paxtakor U21
- Matches: 182
- Goals: 828 (4.55 per match)
- Top goalscorer: Navroʻzbek Iminjonov (24)
- Biggest home win: Navbahor U21 6:1 Olimpik U21 (31 May 2024)
- Biggest away win: Metallurg U21 1:6 Lokomotiv U21 (5 August 2024)
- Highest scoring: Andijon U21 5:2 Surxon U21 (19 August 2024)
- Highest attendance: 426 (1 April 2024, Navbahor U21 2:2 Surxon U21)

Rank	Team	Game	Win	Draw	Loss	GF	GA	Ratio	Points
1	Paxtakor U21	26	16	6	4	58	39	+19	54
2	OKMK U21	26	16	3	7	58	32	+26	51
3	Dinamo U21	26	15	3	8	41	34	+7	48
4	Qizilqum U21	26	11	9	6	31	27	+4	42
5	Nasaf U21	26	12	5	9	41	34	+7	41
6	Lokomotiv U21	26	10	6	10	42	45	−3	36
7	Navbahor U21	26	9	8	9	54	45	+9	35
8	Olimpik U21	26	9	7	10	39	44	−5	34
9	Surxon U21	26	9	6	11	34	44	−10	33
10	Bunyodkor U21	26	10	3	13	37	41	−4	33
11	Andijon U21	26	8	6	12	39	44	−5	30
12	Neftchi U21	26	6	8	12	29	42	−13	26
13	Metallurg U21	26	4	10	12	23	37	−14	22
14	Soʻgʻdiyona U21	26	5	4	17	35	53	−18	19

== Season statistics ==
- First goal of the season: Abror Ismoilov for Navbahor Namangan against Dinamo Samarqand (1 March 2024)

=== Goalscorers ===
As of match played 21 October 2024

Rank	Player	Club	Goals
1	(Serbia) Dragan Ćeran	Pakhtakor	13
2	(North Macedonia) Ljupcho Doriev	Sogdiana Jizzakh	11
3	(Uzbekistan) Anvarjon Hojimirzaev	Dinamo Samarqand	9
3	(Serbia) Zoran Marušić	Nasaf	9
5	(Georgia (country)) Toma Tabatadze	Navbahor Namangan	8
6	(Kyrgyzstan) Joel Kojo	Dinamo Samarqand	7
6	(Georgia (country)) Elguja Lobjanidze	Qizilqum Zarafshon	7
8	(Uzbekistan) Shokhrukh Abdurahmonov	Sogdiana Jizzakh	6
8	(Montenegro) Vladimir Jovović	Sogdiana Jizzakh	6
10	(Uzbekistan) Bobur Abdikholikov	Nasaf	5
10	(Uzbekistan) Jakhongirbek Abdusalomov	Surkhon Termez	5
10	(Uzbekistan) Khurshid Giyosov	AGMK	5
10	(Uzbekistan) Xislat Halilov	Dinamo Samarqand	5
10	(Uzbekistan) Dostonbek Khamdamov	Pakhtakor	5
10	(Montenegro) Marko Milićković	Metallurg Bekabad	5
10	(Nigeria) Effiong Nsungusi	Neftchi Fergana	5
10	(Uzbekistan) Rustam Turdimurodov	Andijon	5

=== Hat-tricks ===
Player	For	Against	Result	Date	Ref
(Uzbekistan) Shokhrukhbek Abdurakhmonov	Sogdiana Jizzakh	Pakhtakor	2–3 (A)	30 March 2024	
(North Macedonia) Ljupcho Doriev	Sogdiana Jizzakh	Bunyodkor	4–0 (H)	26 May 2024	
(Uzbekistan) Bobur Abdikholikov	Nasaf	Lokomotiv Tashkent	3–0 (H)	2 June 2024	
(Uzbekistan) Ibrokhim Ibragimov	Olympic Tashkent	Metallurg Bekabad	4–1 (A)	30 June 2024	
(Montenegro) Vladimir Jovović	Sogdiana Jizzakh	Navbahor	3–0 (A)	26 September 2024	
(Serbia) Dragan Ćeran	Pakhtakor	Dinamo Samarqand	4–2 (H)	6 October 2024	

=== Own goals ===
- (Uzbekistan) Azizbek Pirmuhammadov - Surkhon Termez vs Andijon (16 March 2024)
- (Uzbekistan) Sardor Kulmatov - AGMK vs Sogdiana Jizzakh (19 May 2024)
- (Uzbekistan) Anzur Ismailov - Lokomotiv Tashkent vs Surkhon Termez (27 May 2024)
- (Uzbekistan) Muhsinjon Ubaydullayev - Nasaf vs Neftchi Fergana (20 June 2024)
- (Uzbekistan) Ibrohim Yoldoshev - Andijon vs Navbahor Namangan (26 June 2024)
- (Uzbekistan) Sukhrob Izzatov - Sogdiana Jizzakh vs Pakhtakor (26 August 2024)
- (Uzbekistan) Shakhzod Toirov - Olympic Tashkent vs Dinamo Samarqand (21 September 2024)
- (Uzbekistan) Akbar Abdirasulov - Pakhtakor vs Olympic Tashkent (25 September 2024)

=== Clean sheets ===
As of match played 12 October 2024

Rank	Player	Club	Goals
1	(Uzbekistan) Abduvohid Nematov	Nasaf	13
2	(Serbia) Milan Mitrović	Sogdiana Jizzakh	6
2	(Latvia) Roberts Ozols	Qizilqum Zarafshon	6
4	(Uzbekistan) Utkir Yusupov	Navbahor Namangan	5
4	(Uzbekistan) Khamidullo Abdunabiev	Olympic Tashkent/Bunyodkor	5
4	(Uzbekistan) Vladimir Nazarov	Pakhtakor Tashkent	5
4	(Uzbekistan) Ravshanbek Yagudin	Dinamo Samarqand	5
4	(Uzbekistan) Javohir Ilyosov	AGMK	5
9	(Uzbekistan) Rakhimjon Davronov	Metallurg Bekabad	4
9	(Uzbekistan) Botirali Ergashev	Neftchi Fergana	4
9	(Uzbekistan) Sanjar Kuvvatov	Neftchi Fergana/Navbahor	4

=== Discipline ===
==== Red cards ====
As of match played 12 October 2024

- (Uzbekistan) Akbar Abdirasulov - Nasaf vs Olympic Tashkent (1 March 2024)
- (Uzbekistan) Asadbek Rahimjonov - Olympic Tashkent vs Lokomotiv Tashkent (9 March 2024)
- (Uzbekistan) Usmonali Ismonaliyev - Andijon vs Bunyodkor (10 March 2024)
- (Tajikistan) Shahrom Samiev - Surkhon Termez vs Andijon (16 March 2024)
- (Uzbekistan) Egor Krimets - Surkhon Termez vs Andijon (16 March 2024)
- (Uzbekistan) Ilhomjon Vahobov - Nasaf vs Qizilqum Zarafshon (16 March 2024)
- (Uzbekistan) Abrorbek Toshkuziev - Dinamo Samarqand vs Metallurg Bekabad (28 March 2024)
- (Croatia) Frane Čirjak - AGMK vs Bunyodkor (29 March 2024)
- (Uzbekistan) Tokhirbek Tukhtasinov - Bunyodkor vs Dinamo Samarqand (5 April 2024)
- (Uzbekistan) Dilshod Komilov - Bunyodkor vs Dinamo Samarqand (5 May 2024)
- (Uzbekistan) Islom Mamatkazin - Neftchi Fergana vs Andijon (12 May 2024)
- (Montenegro) Momčilo Rašo - Nasaf vs Bunyodkor (13 May 2024)
- (Georgia (country)) Akaki Shulaia - Qizilqum Zarafshon vs Olympic Tashkent (18 May 2024)
- (Uzbekistan) Sukhrob Sultonov - Bunyodkor vs Lokomotiv Tashkent (21 May 2024)
- (Uzbekistan) Sardor Sabirkhodjaev - Pakhtakor vs Qizilqum Zarafshon (25 May 2024)
- (Uzbekistan) Golib Gaybullaev - Nasaf vs Dinamo Samarqand (25 May 2024)
- (Uzbekistan) Khondamir Mustafokulov - Sogdiana Jizzakh vs Bunyodkor (26 May 2024)
- (Uzbekistan) Abdurauf Buriev - Navbahor Namangan vs Olympic Tashkent (30 May 2024)
- (Uzbekistan) Ilhom Abduganiyev - Qizilqum Zarafshon vs Andijon (15 June 2024)
- (Uzbekistan) Otabek Ahadov - Sogdiana Jizzakh vs Nasaf (16 June 2024)
- (Uzbekistan) Samandarjon Mavlonqulov - Sogdiana Jizzakh vs Nasaf (16 June 2024)
- (Uzbekistan) Samandarjon Mavlonqulov - Surkhon Termez vs Metallurg Bekabad (19 June 2024)
- (Tajikistan) Zoir Dzhuraboyev - Nasaf vs Neftchi Fergana (20 June 2024)
- (Uzbekistan) Mirjakhon Mirakhmadov - Bunyodkor vs Olympic Tashkent (21 June 2024)
- (Croatia) Frane Čirjak - Bunyodkor vs Olympic Tashkent (21 June 2024)
- (Uzbekistan) Islombek Mamatkazin - Dinamo Samarqand vs Andijon (22 June 2024)
- (Uzbekistan) Sunnatilloh Hamidjonov - Olympic Tashkent vs Surkhon Termez (25 June 2024)
- (Uzbekistan) Nodirkhon Nematkhonov - Olympic Tashkent vs Surkhon Termez (25 June 2024)
- (Uzbekistan) Abdurauf Buriev - Olympic Tashkent vs Surkhon Termez (25 June 2024)
- (Uzbekistan) Oybek Rustamov - Qizilqum Zarafshon vs AGMK (28 June 2024)
- (Uzbekistan) Sardor Kulmatov - Sogdiana Jizzakh vs Dinamo Samarqand (28 June 2024)
- (Uzbekistan) Iskandar Shaykulov - Metallurg Bekabad vs Olympic Tashkent (30 June 2024)
- (Uzbekistan) Davron Khashimov - Metallurg Bekabad vs Lokomotiv Tashkent (4 August 2024)
- (Uzbekistan) Gulom-Haydar Gulyamov - Neftchi Fergana vs Dinamo Samarqand (10 August 2024)
- (Uzbekistan) Muhammadali Tursunov - Neftchi Fergana vs Dinamo Samarqand (10 August 2024)
- (Uzbekistan) Sanjar Kodirkulov - Metallurg Bekabad vs Neftchi Fergana (15 August 2024)
- (Serbia) Stefan Čolović - Qizilqum Zarafshon vs Nasaf (16 August 2024)
- (Uzbekistan) Boburbek Yo'ldoshev - Navbahor vs Bunyodkor (19 August 2024)
- (Uzbekistan) Ravshanbek Yagudin - Metallurg Bekabad vs Dinamo Samarqand (23 August 2024)
- (Uzbekistan) Bobur Abdikholikov - Nasaf vs Andijon (25 August 2024)
- (Uzbekistan) Khondamir Mustafoqulov - Sogdiana Jizzakh vs Pakhtakor (26 August 2024)
- (Uzbekistan) Odilbek Abdumajidov - Olympic Tashkent vs Metallurg Bekabad (16 September 2024)
- (Uzbekistan) Muhammadali Abdurahmonov - AGMK vs Surkhon Termez (16 September 2024)
- (Uzbekistan) Jasurbek Khakimov - Lokomotiv Tashkent vs Navbahor (20 September 2024)
- (Uzbekistan) Dostonbek Tursunov - Dinamo Samarqand vs Surkhon Termez (26 September 2024)
- (Uzbekistan) Aziz Kholmurodov - AGMK vs Lokomotiv Tashkent (27 September 2024)
- (Uzbekistan) Sharof Mukhiddinov - Bunyodkor vs Nasaf (28 September 2024)

=== Attendances ===
As of match played 12 October 2024

==== By round ====
2024 Uzbekistan Super League Attendance
Round	Total	GP.	Avg. Per Game
Round 1	13,497	7	1,928
Round 2	26,954	7	3,851
Round 3	16,680	7	2,383
Round 4	29,813	7	4,259
Round 5	26,362	7	3,766
Round 6	31,096	7	4,442
Round 7	34,660	7	4,951
Round 8	47,199	7	6,743
Round 9	31,104	7	4,443
Round 10	37,305	7	5,329
Round 11	18,907	7	2,701
Round 12	26,794	7	3,828
Round 13	38,292	7	5,470
Round 14	33,260	7	4,751
Round 15	21,593	7	3,085
Round 16	26,836	7	3,834
Round 17	15,716	7	2,245
Round 18	30,065	7	4,295
Round 19	25,245	7	3,606
Round 20	27,261	7	3,894
Round 21	3,651	1	3,651
Total	539,746	141	3,828

==== By team ====
Team \ Match played	1	2	3	4	5	6	7	8	9	10	11	12	13	14	15	16	17	18	19	20	21	22	23	24	25	26	Total	Average
AGMK	890	—N/a	551	845	—N/a	1,347	—N/a	655	—N/a	2,326	—N/a	2,078	—N/a	—N/a	4,471	—N/a	—N/a	3,725	—N/a	735	—N/a						17,623	1,762
Andijon	—N/a	10,140	—N/a	14,861	—N/a	18,012	—N/a	19,905	—N/a	17,152	—N/a	—N/a	17,873	13,520	—N/a	7,852	—N/a	9,762	—N/a	13,262	—N/a						141,529	14,153
Bunyodkor	251	—N/a	1,511	—N/a	1,436	1,200	—N/a	2,011	—N/a	3,654	—N/a	707	—N/a	—N/a	1,358	—N/a	571	—N/a	—N/a	2,884	—N/a						15,583	1,558
Dinamo Samarqand	—N/a	1,672	—N/a	921	—N/a	721	—N/a	1,336	—N/a	1,510	—N/a	10,102	—N/a	6,050	—N/a	7,509	—N/a	4,781	—N/a	5,011	—N/a						38,892	3,889
Lokomotiv Tashkent	812	—N/a	836	—N/a	837	—N/a	898	—N/a	698	—N/a	721	837	—N/a	—N/a	798	—N/a	117	—N/a	328	—N/a							6,882	688
Metallurg Bekabad	—N/a	723	—N/a	—N/a	265	—N/a	538	—N/a	3,120	—N/a	210	—N/a	789	286	—N/a	489	456	—N/a	421	—N/a							7,297	730
Nasaf	—N/a	—N/a	2,241	—N/a	7,494	—N/a	4,463	—N/a	7,011	3,505	—N/a	7,456	—N/a	—N/a	8,729	—N/a	6,282	—N/a	15,860	—N/a							63,041	7,005
Navbahor Namangan	7,891	10,362	—N/a	9,857	—N/a	7,251	—N/a	22,350	—N/a	8,591	—N/a	5,186	—N/a	—N/a	—N/a	4,852	—N/a	8,930	—N/a	3,905	—N/a						89,175	8,918
Neftchi Fergana	1,154	—N/a	9,251	—N/a	14,785	—N/a	19,867	—N/a	15,120	—N/a	10,200	—N/a	10,922	6,436	4,233	—N/a	3,252	—N/a	4,056	—N/a							88,354	8,835
Olympic Tashkent	—N/a	310	—N/a	2,344	—N/a	—N/a	4,555	—N/a	1,533	—N/a	635	—N/a	1,235	3,277	—N/a	468	—N/a	112	322	—N/a							10,612	1,769
Pakhtakor	—N/a	3,220	—N/a	556	—N/a	2,245	—N/a	—N/a	987	—N/a	3,751	—N/a	1,258	3,381	—N/a	1,465	—N/a	2,442	—N/a	890	3,651						23,846	2,168
Qizilqum Zarafshon	—N/a	527	—N/a	429	—N/a	320	—N/a	425	—N/a	—N/a	402	—N/a	1,353	310	—N/a	4,201	—N/a	313	—N/a	574	—N/a						7,501	750
Sogdiana Jizzakh	1,810	—N/a	1,322	—N/a	1,124	—N/a	3,750	—N/a	2,545	—N/a	2,988	—N/a	4,862	—N/a	1,457	—N/a	4,002	—N/a	4,028	—N/a							27,888	2,789
Surkhon Termez	689	—N/a	968	—N/a	421	—N/a	589	1,327	—N/a	567	—N/a	428	—N/a	—N/a	547	—N/a	1,036	—N/a	230	—N/a	—N/a						6,802	680

== See also ==
- 2024 Uzbekistan Pro League
- 2024 Uzbekistan Cup
- 2024 Uzbekistan Super Cup
