= Dilshod Komilov =

Uzbekistani footballer (born 1999)

Personal information
- Full name: Dilshod Komilov
- Date of birth: 16 May 1999 (age 27)
- Place of birth: Tashkent, Uzbekistan
- Height: 1.66 m (5 ft 5 in)
- Position: Defender

Team information
- Current team: Navbahor
- Number: 5

Senior career*
Years	Team	Apps	(Gls)
2019–2022	Lokomotiv	42	(0)
2023	Andijon	12	(0)
2024	Lokomotiv	12	(3)
2024	Nasaf	12	(0)
2025	Qizilqum	20	(1)
2026–	Navbahor	8	(1)

International career^{‡}
2021	Uzbekistan U23	3	(0)
2026–	Uzbekistan	1	(0)
Medal record
Representing Uzbekistan
CAFA Nations Cup
Winner	2025 Tajikistan–Uzbekistan	Team
- * Club domestic league appearances and goals as of 29 July 2026 ‡ National team caps and goals as of 27 January 2025

Dilahod Komilov (born 16 May 1999) is an Uzbekistani professional footballer who plays as a defender for Navbahor.

== Career ==
On 6 January 2024 Dilshod Komilov returned to Lokomotiv Tashkent.

== Career statistics ==
=== International ===
Komilov made his debut for the Uzbekistan main team on 27 January 2025 in a Friendly match against Jordan.

Uzbekistan national team
Year	Apps	Goals
2025	1	0
Total	1	0

Statistics accurate as of match played 27 January 2025.

== Honours ==
Nasaf

- Uzbekistan Super League: 2024
- Uzbekistan Super Cup winners: 2024
