= Miljan Škrbić =

Serbian footballer

Personal information
- Full name: Miljan Škrbić
- Date of birth: 18 September 1995 (age 31)
- Place of birth: Crvenka, FR Yugoslavia
- Height: 1.92 m (6 ft 4 in)
- Position: Forward

Team information
- Current team: Borac Čačak
- Number: 11

Youth career
- Crvenka
- OFK Beograd

Senior career*
Years	Team	Apps	(Gls)
2013–2015	OFK Beograd	18	(3)
2016–2018	Krško	45	(17)
2019	Giresunspor	3	(1)
2020–2021	Zrinjski Mostar	9	(1)
2021–2023	Radnički Niš	48	(17)
2024	AGMK	6	(1)
2024	Tekstilac Odžaci	5	(0)
2025	Madura United	11	(3)
2025	Maziya	0	(0)
2026–	Borac Čačak	10	(0)
- * Club domestic league appearances and goals as of 14 May 2026

Miljan Škrbić (Serbian Cyrillic: Миљан Шкрбић; born 18 September 1995) is a Serbian professional footballer who plays as a forward for Serbian First League club Borac Čačak.

== Career ==
On 2 March 2013, Škrbić scored on his official debut for OFK Beograd after coming on as a substitute in a 3–1 home loss to Jagodina. In September 2016, Škrbić joined Slovenian club Krško. He left Krško in 2018 and joined Giresunspor in January 2019. On 6 February 2020, Škrbić signed a two-and-a-half-year contract with Bosnian Premier League club Zrinjski Mostar. He made his official debut for Zrinjski in a 2–0 league win against Čelik Zenica on 23 February 2020. Škrbić terminated his contract with Zrinjski and left the club in June 2021.

== Career statistics ==
=== Club ===
As of match played 10 May 2025.

Appearances and goals by club, season and competition
Club	Season	League			Cup		Continental		Total	
Club	Season	Division	Apps	Goals	Apps	Goals	Apps	Goals	Apps	Goals
OFK Beograd	2012–13	Serbian SuperLiga	5	1	1	0	—		6	1
OFK Beograd	2013–14	Serbian Superliga	7	1	1	0	—		8	1
OFK Beograd	2014–15	Serbian Superliga	0	0	0	0	—		0	0
OFK Beograd	2015–16	Serbian Superliga	6	1	1	1	—		7	2
OFK Beograd	Total		18	3	3	1	0	0	21	4
Krško	2016–17	Slovenian PrvaLiga	12	5	1	0	—		13	5
Krško	2017–18	Slovenian PrvaLiga	33	12	2	1	—		35	13
Krško	Total		45	17	3	1	0	0	48	18
Giresunspor	2018–19	TFF First League	3	1	0	0	—		3	1
Zrinjski Mostar	2019–20	Bosnian Premier League	3	1	1	0	—		4	1
Zrinjski Mostar	2020–21	Bosnian Premier League	6	0	0	0	0	0	6	0
Zrinjski Mostar	Total		9	1	1	0	0	0	10	1
Radnički Niš	2021–22	Serbian Superliga	19	9	0	0	—		19	9
Radnički Niš	2022–23	Serbian Superliga	18	6	1	0	—		19	6
Radnički Niš	2023–24	Serbian Superliga	11	2	0	0	—		11	2
Radnički Niš	Total		48	17	1	0	0	0	49	17
AGMK	2024	Uzbekistan Super League	6	1	1	0	—		7	1
Tekstilac Odžaci	2024–25	Serbian SuperLiga	5	0	0	0	—		5	0
Madura United	2024–25	Liga 1	11	3	0	0	4 (Note: Appearances in AFC Challenge League)	0	15	3
Career total			145	43	9	2	4	0	158	45
