= Maykon Douglas =

Brazilian footballer

Personal information
- Full name: Maykon Douglas da Silva Neris
- Date of birth: 11 April 2001 (age 25)
- Place of birth: Coruripe, Brazil
- Height: 1.77 m (5 ft 10 in)
- Position: Midfielder

Team information
- Current team: Qizilqum
- Number: 70

Youth career
- 2020: Vitória
- 2020–2021: Botafogo

Senior career*
Years	Team	Apps	(Gls)
2021–2023	Vitória	10	(0)
2022	→ Maguary (loan)	11	(1)
2022	→ Osaka (loan)	9	(0)
2023	→ Maguary (loan)	6	(0)
2023–2024	Maguary	6	(1)
2024	→ Caldense (loan)	4	(0)
2024–2025	Dinamo Samarqand	22	(1)
2026–	Qizilqum	3	(0)
- * Club domestic league appearances and goals as of 29 July 2026

Maykon Douglas da Silva Neris (born 11 April 2001), known as Maykon Douglas is a Brazilian footballer who plays as a Midfielder for Uzbekistan Super League club Qizilqum.

== Career statistics ==
As of 1 December 2024

Club	Season	League			Cup		Continental		Total	
Club	Season	Division	Apps	Goals	Apps	Goals	Apps	Goals	Apps	Goals
Dinamo Samarqand	2024	Uzbekistan Super League	12	1	0	0	–		12	1
Career total		Uzbekistan Super League	12	1	0	0	–		12	1

== Honours ==
Vitória

- Campeonato Carioca Série B1: 2022
