= Sylvanus Nimely =

Liberian footballer

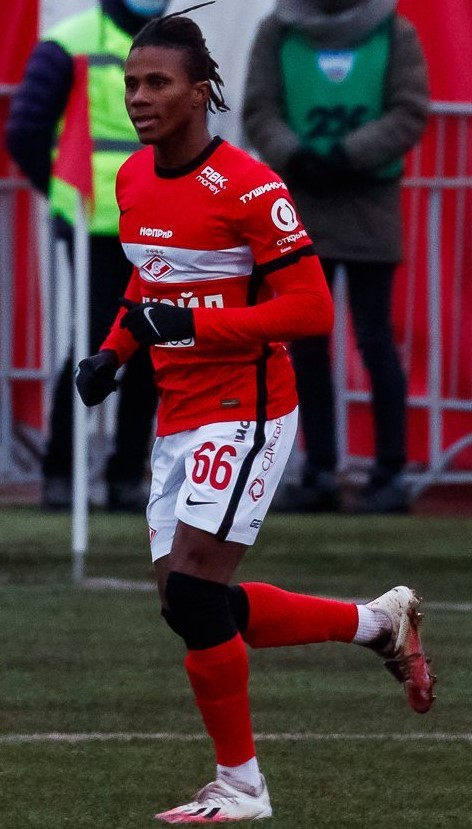

Personal information
- Full name: Sylvanus Solarie Nimely
- Date of birth: 4 September 1998 (age 28)
- Place of birth: Monrovia, Liberia
- Height: 1.77 m (5 ft 10 in)
- Position: Forward

Team information
- Current team: Kokand 1912 (on loan from Neftchi Fergana)
- Number: 11

Youth career
- 2013–2014: Monrovia Club Breweries
- 2014: Karviná
- 2015: Vítkovice
- 2015–2016: Baník Ostrava

Senior career*
Years	Team	Apps	(Gls)
2016–2017	Karviná	0	(0)
2017–2020	Spartak Moscow	1	(0)
2017–2020	Spartak-2 Moscow	108	(23)
2021	Gorica	9	(0)
2021–2022	Ilves	11	(0)
2022–2023	Solin	25	(4)
2023–2024	Surkhon Termez	30	(12)
2024–2025	Sumgayit	18	(1)
2025–	Neftchi Fergana	6	(0)
2026–	→ Kokand 1912 (loan)	19	(5)

International career^{‡}
2013–	Liberia	16	(2)
- * Club domestic league appearances and goals as of 20 September 2026 ‡ National team caps and goals as of 17 November 2026

Sylvanus Nimely (born 4 September 1998) is a Liberian professional footballer who plays as a forward for Uzbekistan Pro League side Kokand 1912, on loan from Neftchi Fergana.

== Club career ==
On 23 February 2017, he joined the Russian Premier League side FC Spartak Moscow.

After playing for a year and a half for the second squad FC Spartak-2 Moscow, he made his debut in the Russian Premier League on 29 October 2018 in a game against FC Rubin Kazan.

On 26 January 2021, Spartak announced that Nimely transferred to Croatian side HNK Gorica.

In August 2021, Nimely joined Ilves in Finnish top-tier Veikkausliiga. Unable to make an impact, he left the club after the season and joined Croatian side NK Solin in February 2022.

In February 2023, he signed with Surkhon Termez in Uzbekistan Super League.

On 14 August 2024, Azerbaijan Premier League club Sumgayit announced the signing of Nimely.

== International career ==
He made his international debut on 7 September 2013, coming on as a 70th-minute substitute for Samuel Thompson in a 4–1 2014 FIFA World Cup qualifying defeat to Angola at the Tundavala National Stadium in Lubango.

== Personal life ==
His older brother, Alex, also played football.

== Career statistics ==
=== Club ===
As of 20 September 2026

Appearances and goals by club, season and competition
Club	Season	League			Cup (Note: Includes Czech Cup, Russian Cup, Croatian Cup and Uzbek Cup)		Other		Total	
Club	Season	Division	Apps	Goals	Apps	Goals	Apps	Goals	Apps	Goals
Karviná	2016–17	Czech First League	0	0	1	0	–		1	0
Spartak Moscow	2017–18	Russian Premier League	0	0	0	0	0	0	0	0
Spartak Moscow	2018–19	Russian Premier League	1	0	0	0	–		1	0
Spartak Moscow	Total		1	0	0	0	0	0	1	0
Spartak-2 Moscow	2016–17	Russian First League	11	1	–		–		11	1
Spartak-2 Moscow	2017–18	Russian First League	29	5	–		–		29	5
Spartak-2 Moscow	2018–19	Russian First League	29	8	–		–		29	8
Spartak-2 Moscow	2019–20	Russian First League	24	6	–		–		24	6
Spartak-2 Moscow	2020–21	Russian First League	16	3	–		–		16	3
Spartak-2 Moscow	Total		109	23	0	0	0	0	109	23
Gorica	2020–21	HNL	9	0	2	1	–		11	1
Ilves	2021	Veikkausliiga	11	0	–		–		11	0
Solin	2021–22	Prva NL	9	0	–		–		9	0
Solin	2022–23	Prva NL	16	4	2	2	–		18	6
Solin	Total		25	4	2	2	0	0	27	6
Surkhon Termez	2023	Uzbekistan Super League	26	12	4	1	–		30	13
Surkhon Termez	2024	Uzbekistan Super League	4	0	1	1	–		5	1
Surkhon Termez	Total		30	12	5	2	0	0	35	14
Sumgayit	2024–25	Azerbaijan Premier League	18	1	0	0	–		18	1
Neftchi Fergana	2025	Uzbekistan Super League	6	0	–		–		6	0
Kokand 1912 (loan)	2026	Uzbekistan Super League	19	5	4	2	–		23	7
Career total			228	45	14	7	0	0	240	52

=== International ===
As of 17 November 2026

Liberia
Year	Apps	Goals
2013	1	0
2014	0	0
2015	0	0
2016	0	0
2017	2	0
2018	4	0
2019	4	0
2020	1	0
2026	4	2
Total	16	2

Scores and results list Rwanda's goal tally first.

No.	Date	Venue	Opponent	Score	Result	Competition
1.	25 September 2026	Amahoro Stadium, Kigali, Rwanda	Rwanda	1–2	1–3	2027 Africa Cup of Nations qualification
2.	17 November 2026	Samuel Kanyon Doe Sports Complex, Monrovia, Liberia	Cape Verde	2–0	2–0	2027 Africa Cup of Nations qualification
