= Vladimir Bubanja =

Serbian football defender

Personal information
- Full name: Владимир Бубања
- Date of birth: 2 August 1989 (age 37)
- Place of birth: Kragujevac, SFR Yugoslavia
- Height: 1.97 m (6 ft 5 1/2 in)
- Positions: Centre-back; defensive midfielder

Team information
- Current team: Metallurg Bekabad
- Number: 15

Senior career*
| Years | Team | Apps | (Gls) |
| 2007–2009 | Erdoglija Kragujevac | | |
| 2009–2012 | Pobeda Beloševac | | |
| 2013–2015 | Radnički Kragujevac | 51 | (1) |
| 2015–2016 | Kolubara | 25 | (3) |
| 2016 | Metalac Gornji Milanovac | 0 | (0) |
| 2016–2018 | Zemun | 35 | (1) |
| 2018 | AGMK | 13 | (3) |
| 2019–2020 | Surkhon Termez | 31 | (1) |
| 2020 | Inđija | 0 | (0) |
| 2021 | Surkhon Termez | 13 | (0) |
| 2021 | Novi Pazar | 4 | (0) |
| 2022–2024 | Andijan | 66 | (7) |
| 2025–2026 | Khorazm | 27 | (1) |
| 2026– | Metallurg Bekabad | 0 | (0) |
- * Club domestic league appearances and goals as of 19 March 2026

Vladimir Bubanja (Serbian Cyrillic: Владимир Бубања; born 2 August 1989) is a Serbian footballer who plays as a defender for Uzbekistan Super League club Metallurg Bekabad.
