= Momčilo Rašo =

Montenegrin footballer

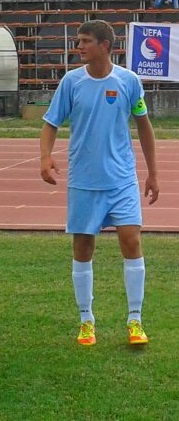

Personal information
- Date of birth: 6 February 1997 (age 29)
- Place of birth: Kotor, Serbia and Montenegro
- Height: 1.85 m (6 ft 1 in)
- Position: Centre back

Team information
- Current team: Flamurtari
- Number: 4

Youth career
- 2007–2014: Igalo

Senior career*
Years	Team	Apps	(Gls)
2013–2015	Igalo	22	(0)
2015–2016	Ústí nad Labem	8	(0)
2016	Dečić	5	(0)
2016–2018	Rabotnichki	45	(0)
2018–2019	AEL Limassol	18	(0)
2019–2021	→ Jelgava (loan)	13	(0)
2021	Radnički 1923	9	(0)
2022	Rabotnichki	11	(1)
2022–2023	Balzan	35	(2)
2024	Bunyodkor	17	(1)
2025	Lokomotiv Tashkent	20	(1)
2026–	Flamurtari	10	(1)

International career
2015–2017	Montenegro U19	9	(2)
2017–2018	Montenegro U21	11	(0)
- * Club domestic league appearances and goals as of 13 May 2026

Momčilo Rašo (born 6 February 1997) is a Montenegrin professional footballer who plays as a centre back for Kategoria Superiore club Flamurtari.

== Club career ==
Born in Kotor, Rašo began his career in FK Igalo in 2007, playing for them until 2014 before moving to Czech side FK Ústí nad Labem. After one season in FK Ústí nad Labem, he played for FK Dečić and FK Rabotnički.

In June 2018, Rašo joined Cypriot club AEL Limassol on a three-year contract.

In January 2019, Rašo was loaned out to Latvian club FK Jelgava for the six months.

== International career ==
He has been a regular member of Montenegrin U-19 and U-21 national teams.

== Honours ==
AEL Limassol

- Cypriot Cup: 2018–19
