= Arihiro Sentoku =

Japanese footballer

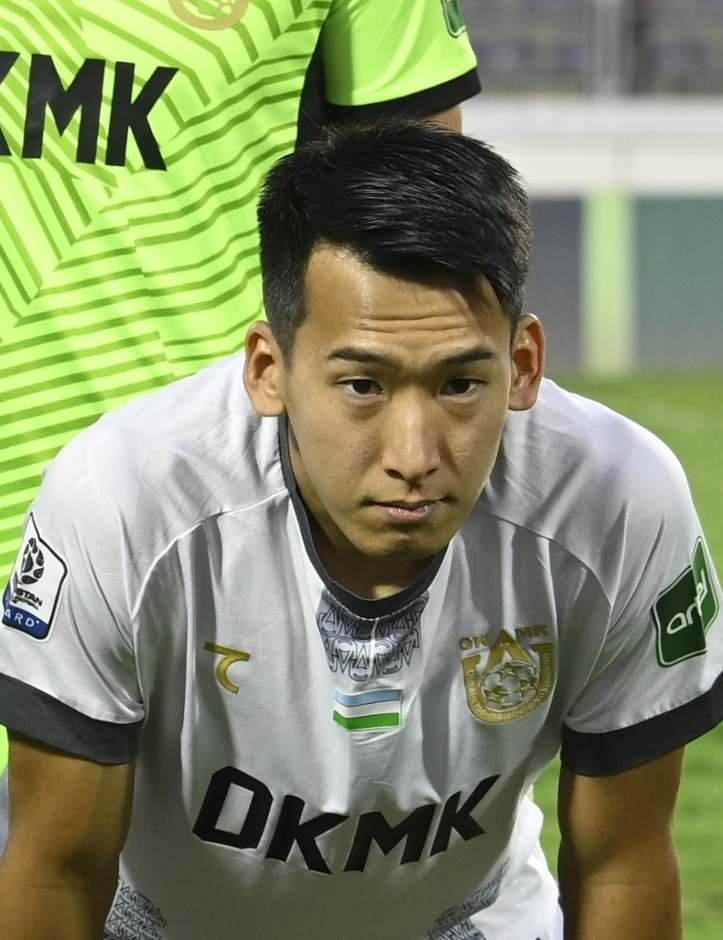
- Sentoku with AGMK in 2025

Personal information
- Full name: Arihiro Sentoku
- Date of birth: 8 December 1998 (age 27)
- Place of birth: Fukuoka, Japan
- Height: 1.78 m (5 ft 10 in)
- Position: Midfielder

Team information
- Current team: AGMK
- Number: 28

Youth career
- 2014–2016: Hotoku Gakuen High School

Senior career*
Years	Team	Apps	(Gls)
2017–2020	Kom	34	(3)
2020–2022	Podgorica	64	(6)
2022	Voždovac	9	(1)
2023	Iskra	15	(1)
2023	Rudar	18	(1)
2024–	AGMK	59	(5)
- * Club domestic league appearances and goals as of 28 July 2026

Arihiro Sentoku (千徳 有寛, Arihiro Sentoku; born 9 December 1998) is a Japanese professional football player who plays for AGMK.

== Early life ==
Sentoku was a pupil of Setouchi School (Hiroshima).

== Career ==
In July 2017, he became a player for the Montenegrin club Kom, making his debut in a second division match against the Sutjeska club. On 14 September 2019, he scored his debut goal for the club against Iskra.

In August 2020, he moved to the Podgorica club and made his debut in the first round match against Mladost Podgorica. On 29 August, he scored his debut goal against Buducnost.

In July 2020, he became a player for the Voždovac club, making his debut in the Serbian Super League match against Novi Pazar.

On 23 February 2024, Almalyk signed a contract with the AGMK team.
