= Kuvondik Ruziev =

Uzbekistani footballer

Personal information
- Full name: Quvondiq Uktam oʻgʻli Roʻziyev
- Date of birth: October 6, 1994 (age 32)
- Place of birth: Jarkurgan, Uzbekistan
- Height: 1.76 m (5 ft 9 in)
- Position: Midfielder

Team information
- Current team: Navbahor Namangan
- Number: 20

Senior career*
Years	Team	Apps	(Gls)
2014–2017	Lokomotiv Tashkent	25	(0)
2015	→ Kokand 1912 (loan)	25	(0)
2017–2020	Kokand 1912	95	(6)
2021	Navbahor Namangan	22	(0)
2022	Kokand 1912	25	(0)
2023	Turon	13	(1)
2023–2024	Sri Pahang	14	(1)
2024–2025	Neftchi Fergana	40	(0)
2026–	Navbahor Namangan	13	(0)

International career^{‡}
2019–	Uzbekistan	6	(0)
- * Club domestic league appearances and goals as of 29 July 2026 ‡ National team caps and goals as of 1 April 2021

Quvondiq Uktam oʻgʻli Roʻziyev (born 6 October 1994), better known as Kuvondik Ruziev, is an Uzbekistani professional footballer who plays for Navbahor Namangan and the Uzbekistan national team.

== Club career ==
After leaving Sri Pahang, he returned to Uzbekistan and signed for Nefchi on 17 July 2024.

== International career ==
Ruziev made his debut for the Uzbekistan national football team in a friendly 2-0 loss to Turkey on 2 June 2019.
