= Vladimir Jovović =

Montenegrin footballer (born 1994)

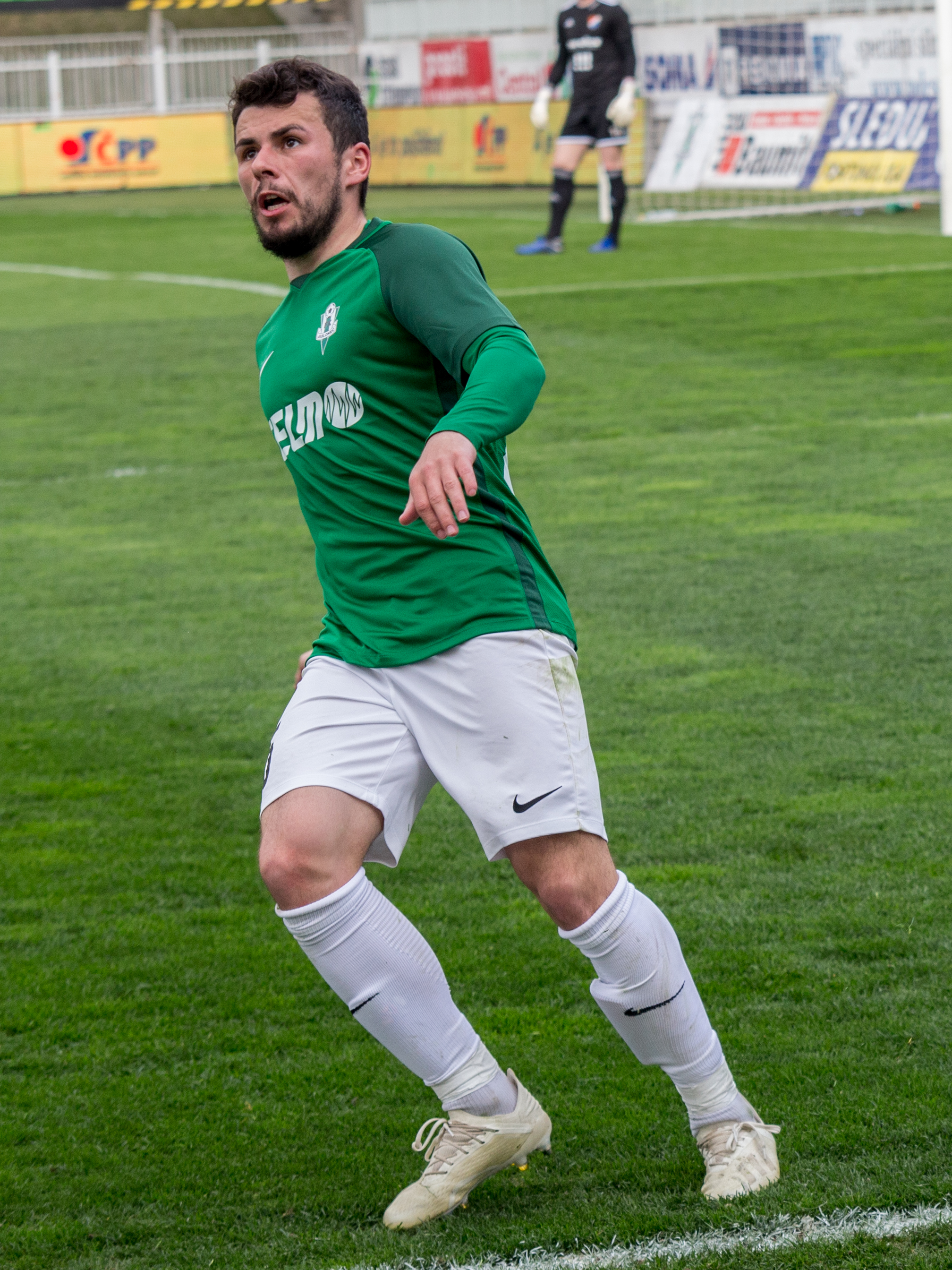
- Jovović with Jablonec in 2019

Personal information
- Date of birth: 26 October 1994 (age 32)
- Place of birth: Nikšić, Montenegro, FR Yugoslavia
- Height: 1.73 m (5 ft 8 in)
- Positions: Attacking midfielder; winger

Team information
- Current team: Neftchi
- Number: 8

Youth career
- Sutjeska

Senior career*
Years	Team	Apps	(Gls)
2011–2015	Sutjeska	78	(9)
2015–2017	Red Star Belgrade	0	(0)
2016	→ OFK Beograd (loan)	12	(5)
2016	→ Napredak Kruševac (loan)	9	(1)
2017	→ Spartak Subotica (loan)	12	(1)
2017–2021	Jablonec	103	(15)
2022	Sutjeska	23	(4)
2022–2024	Jablonec	30	(3)
2024	Sogdiana	24	(8)
2025–	Neftchi	32	(3)

International career^{‡}
2012	Montenegro U19	3	(0)
2012–2016	Montenegro U21	10	(2)
2013–	Montenegro	64	(0)
- * Club domestic league appearances and goals as of 20:15, 28 July 2026 (UTC) ‡ National team caps and goals as of 16 November 2024

Vladimir Jovović (Montenegrin Cyrillic: Владимир Јововић, pronounced [ʋlǎdimiːr jôːʋoʋitɕ]; born 26 October 1994) is a Montenegrin professional footballer who plays as an attacking midfielder for Uzbekistan Super League club Neftchi.

== Club career ==
=== Sutjeska ===
Jovović made his professional debut with Sutjeska Nikšić in 2011 at the age of 17. He was one of the youngest starting players in Sutjeska's championship-winning generation of the 2012–13 season. In the 2013–14 UEFA Champions League qualifying phase, he recorded an assist in the match against Sheriff Tiraspol in Tiraspol. In June 2013, Partizan sent its sporting director Albert Nađ to scout Jovović. On 26 January 2015, it was announced that several Premier League teams were interested in signing Jovović, especially Aston Villa. In March 2015, in a 3–0 loss to Budućnost, Jovović and Budućnost player Miloš Novović got in a fight on the field, and Jovović subsequently attacked the referee. Due to the incident, on top of getting a red card, Jovović was suspended by Montenegro's football authority for 6 months.

=== Red Star Belgrade ===
Jovović's contract with Sutjeska expired at the end of the 2014–15 season. He trained with Red Star Belgrade in April 2015, although without having signed a binding contract. Jovović started the new season with Red Star Belgrade under coach Miodrag Božović. After his suspension expired, he signed for Red Star on 14 August 2015. He made his debut for the new club in a cup match against Borac Čačak, played on 2 December 2015.

At the end of the 2015–16 winter transfer window, Jovović was loaned to OFK Beograd. The coach at OFK Beograd, Dragan Radojičić, had previously been Jovović's coach at Sutjeska. On 21 February 2016, Jovović scored against Partizan on his debut for OFK Beograd. After he scored 5 goals on 12 matches with OFK Beograd, Jovović was recalled to the first team of Red Star Belgrade, but later he moved on a new six-month loan to Napredak Kruševac. For the second half of the same season, Jovović was loaned to Spartak Subotica.

Returning from loan spell in summer 2017, Jovović started new season with Red Star, being licensed for first qualifying round of the 2017–18 UEFA Europa League. After he failed to make any appearance, Jovović terminated the contract with the club and left as a free agent on the last day of July same year.

=== Jablonec ===
Shortly after he left his former club, Jovović signed a one-year contract with the Czech First League team Jablonec on 1 August 2017, with an option for one additional year. He made his debut for new club in 2–2 draw to Dukla Prague on 20 August same year. Jovović scored his first goal for Jablonec on 17 September 2017, in a 5–0 victory against Vysočina Jihlava. He also scored a brace in a 3–1 win over Mladá Boleslav.

=== Return to Jablonec ===
After one season Jovović returned to the Czech First League team Jablonec. On 9 January 2024, Jovović left Jablonec.

=== Sogdiana Jizzakh ===
In January 2024, Jovović signed a one-year contract with Uzbekistani club Sogdiana Jizzakh.

== International career ==
Jovović began playing for Montenegro U21 in late 2013 for the 2015 UEFA European Under-21 Football Championship qualification. At 19 years of age, Jovović made his debut for the Montenegro senior national team on 17 November 2013, in a friendly match against Luxembourg. He has, as of September 2020, earned a total of 32 caps, scoring no goals.

== Career statistics ==
=== Club ===
As of 1 October 2017

Appearances and goals by club, season and competition
Club	Season	League			Cup		Continental		Other		Total	
Club	Season	Division	Apps	Goals	Apps	Goals	Apps	Goals	Apps	Goals	Apps	Goals
Sutjeska Nikšić	2011–12	Montenegrin First League	6	0	—		—		—		6	0
Sutjeska Nikšić	2012–13	Montenegrin First League	30	3	—		—		—		30	3
Sutjeska Nikšić	2013–14	Montenegrin First League	28	2	—		2	0	—		30	2
Sutjeska Nikšić	2014–15	Montenegrin First League	14	4	2	0	2	0	—		18	4
Sutjeska Nikšić	Total		78	9	2	0	4	0	—		84	9
OFK Beograd (loan)	2015–16	Serbian SuperLiga	12	5	—		—		—		12	5
Napredak Kruševac (loan)	2016–17	Serbian SuperLiga	9	1	1	0	—		—		10	1
Spartak Subotica (loan)	2016–17	Serbian SuperLiga	12	1	—		—		—		12	1
Red Star Belgrade	2015–16	Serbian SuperLiga	0	0	1	0	—		—		1	0
Red Star Belgrade	2016–17	Serbian SuperLiga	0	0	—		0	0	—		0	0
Red Star Belgrade	2017–18	Serbian SuperLiga	—		—		0	0	—		0	0
Red Star Belgrade	Total		0	0	1	0	0	0	—		1	0
Jablonec	2017–18	Czech First League	5	3	1	0	—		—		6	3
Career total			116	19	5	0	4	0	—		125	19

=== International ===
As of 16 March 2017

Appearances and goals by national team and year
National team	Year	Apps	Goals
Montenegro	2013	1	0
Montenegro	2014	4	0
Montenegro	2015	0	0
Montenegro	2016	3	0
Total		8	0

== Honours ==
Sutjeska

- Montenegrin First League: 2012–13, 2013–14
