= 2025 CAFA Nations Cup squads =

The following is a list of squads for each nation competing in the 2025 CAFA Nations Cup, held from 29 August to 8 September in the cities of Tashkent, Uzbekistan and Hisor, Tajikistan. The age listed for each player is on 29 August 2025, the first day of the tournament. Players may hold more than one non-FIFA nationality. A flag is included for coaches that are of a different nationality than their own national team. Each team was required to register a preliminary squad of up to 35 players, three of whom had to be goalkeepers, from which the matchday squad could be selected on a match-by-match basis.

== Afghanistan ==
The Afghanistan squad of 23 players was announced by CAFA on 27 August 2025.

Head coach: (Italy) Vincenzo Annese

No.	Pos.	Player	Date of birth (age)	Caps	Goals	Club
1	GK	Faisal Hamidi	29 January 1997 (age 29)	9	0	(Afghanistan Football Federation) FC Sorkh Poshan Herat
22	GK	Keyvan Mottaghian	16 March 2003 (age 23)	1	0	Free agent
23	GK	Eisa Azizi	26 December 2002 (age 23)	0	0	(Football Australia) Glenorchy Knights
4	DF	Mahboob Hanifi	22 March 1996 (age 30)	17	0	(Afghanistan Football Federation) Abu Muslim
21	DF	Sharif Muhammad (captain)	15 February 1989 (age 37)	31	2	(Russian Football Union) SKA Rostov-na-Donu
3	DF	Amid Arezou	5 June 1996 (age 30)	2	0	(Norwegian Football Federation) Arendal
5	DF	Roholla Iqbalzadeh	14 December 1995 (age 30)	3	0	(Norwegian Football Federation) Heimdal
12	DF	Said Aref	7 July 2003 (age 23)	1	0	Free agent
20	DF	Thomas Safari	14 May 1996 (age 30)	1	0	(Canadian Soccer Association) Alliance Soccer Laval
2	DF	Elias Mansor	17 November 2006 (age 19)	1	0	(The Football Association) Millwall U21
14	MF	Nazary Zelfegar	1 January 1995 (age 31)	21	1	(Afghanistan Football Federation) Abu Muslim
8	MF	Rahmat Akbari	20 June 2000 (age 26)	11	1	(Football Australia) Gold Coast Knights
15	MF	Mohammad Naeem Rahimi	4 April 1994 (age 32)	8	0	(Football Australia) Bulleen Lions
16	MF	Ali Reza Panahi	22 August 2000 (age 26)	1	0	(Afghanistan Football Federation) Abu Muslim
13	MF	Yama Sherzad	19 June 2001 (age 25)	5	0	(Swiss Football Association) FC Prishtina Bern
17	MF	Sayed Mortaza Fatemi	10 May 1999 (age 27)	1	0	(Football Australia) Malvern City
10	FW	Taufee Skandari	2 April 1999 (age 27)	13	0	(Afghanistan Football Federation) Abu Muslim
19	FW	Omid Musawi	1 January 2001 (age 25)	16	0	(Football Association of Malaysia) Selangor
18	FW	Hossein Zamani	19 January 2002 (age 24)	5	1	(Football Association of Bosnia and Herzegovina) FK Zvijezda 09
7	FW	Mosawer Ahadi	8 March 2000 (age 26)	14	0	(Football Association of Finland) JäPS
11	FW	Maziar Kouhyar	30 September 1997 (age 29)	11	0	(The Football Association) Notts County
6	FW	Habibullah Hotak	17 May 2007 (age 19)	0	0	(Afghanistan Football Federation) Abu Muslim
9	FW	Balal ArezouP	29 December 1988 (age 37)	28	9	(Norwegian Football Federation) Grane Arendal

== India ==
The India squad of 23 players was announced by AIFF on 25 August 2025, and by CAFA on 27 August 2025.

Head coach: Khalid Jamil

No.	Pos.	Player	Date of birth (age)	Caps	Goals	Club
1	GK	Gurpreet Singh Sandhu	3 February 1992 (age 34)	76	0	(All India Football Federation) Bengaluru
13	GK	Hrithik Tiwari	10 January 2002 (age 24)	0	0	(All India Football Federation) Goa
23	GK	Amrinder Singh	27 May 1993 (age 33)	14	0	(All India Football Federation) Odisha
2	DF	Rahul Bheke	6 December 1990 (age 35)	38	3	(All India Football Federation) Bengaluru
3	DF	Roshan Singh Naorem	2 February 1999 (age 27)	12	0	(All India Football Federation) Bengaluru
4	DF	Anwar Ali	28 August 2000 (age 26)	27	1	(All India Football Federation) East Bengal
5	DF	Sandesh Jhingan	21 July 1993 (age 33)	67	5	(All India Football Federation) Goa
14	DF	Chinglensana Singh Konsham	23 November 1996 (age 29)	12	0	(All India Football Federation) Bengaluru
16	DF	Hmingthanmawia Ralte	31 May 2000 (age 26)	2	0	(All India Football Federation) Mumbai City
18	DF	Muhammad Uvais	31 July 1998 (age 28)	0	0	(All India Football Federation) Punjab
6	MF	Nikhil Prabhu	2 October 2000 (age 26)	1	0	(All India Football Federation) Punjab
8	MF	Suresh Singh Wangjam	7 August 2000 (age 26)	35	1	(All India Football Federation) Bengaluru
11	MF	Mahesh Singh Naorem	1 March 1999 (age 27)	24	3	(All India Football Federation) East Bengal
15	MF	Udanta Singh Kumam	14 June 1996 (age 30)	51	2	(All India Football Federation) Goa
19	MF	Danish Farooq Bhat	9 May 1995 (age 31)	2	0	(All India Football Federation) Kerala Blasters
20	MF	Jeakson Singh Thounaojam	21 June 2001 (age 25)	25	0	(All India Football Federation) East Bengal
21	MF	Boris Singh Thangjam	3 January 2000 (age 26)	4	0	(All India Football Federation) Goa
22	MF	Ashique Kuruniyan	14 June 1997 (age 29)	38	2	(All India Football Federation) Bengaluru
7	FW	Lallianzuala Chhangte	8 June 1997 (age 29)	44	8	(All India Football Federation) Mumbai City
9	FW	Vikram Partap Singh	16 January 2002 (age 24)	3	0	(All India Football Federation) Mumbai City
10	FW	Irfan Yadwad	19 June 2001 (age 25)	3	0	(All India Football Federation) Chennaiyin
12	FW	Manvir Singh Jr.	15 June 2001 (age 25)	3	0	(All India Football Federation) Jamshedpur
17	FW	Jithin M. S.	16 January 1998 (age 28)	3	0	(All India Football Federation) NorthEast United

== Iran ==
The preliminary Iran squad of 35 players was announced by CAFA on 27 August 2025, with a final 27-player squad being announced from the preliminary list by the Iranian federation ahead of the first match. Prior to the start of the tournament, Ahmad Gohari replaced Hossein Hosseini due to injury. Following the first match, Mohammad Khodabandelou and Alireza Koushki were withdrawn due to injury and replaced by Abolfazl Jalali, who had been included in the preliminary squad.

Head coach: Amir Ghalenoei

No.	Pos.	Player	Date of birth (age)	Caps	Goals	Club
1	GK	Payam Niazmand	6 April 1995 (age 31)	9	0	(Football Federation Islamic Republic of Iran) Persepolis
12	GK	Ahmad Gohari (Note: Prior to the start of the tournament, Ahmad Gohari replaced Hossein Hosseini due to injury.)	12 January 1996 (age 30)	0	0	(Football Federation Islamic Republic of Iran) Paykan
22	GK	Nima Mirzazad	27 February 1997 (age 29)	0	0	(Football Federation Islamic Republic of Iran) Mes Rafsanjan
2	DF	Alireza Koushki (Note: Following the first match, Mohammad Khodabandelou and Alireza Koushki were withdrawn due to injury and replaced by Abolfazl Jalali, who had been included in the preliminary squad.)	16 February 2000 (age 26)	0	0	(Football Federation Islamic Republic of Iran) Esteghlal
3	DF	Mohammad Naderi	5 October 1996 (age 30)	1	0	(Football Federation Islamic Republic of Iran) Tractor
4	DF	Amin Hazbavi	6 May 2003 (age 23)	4	0	(Football Federation Islamic Republic of Iran) Sepahan
5	DF	Ali Nemati	7 February 1996 (age 30)	8	0	(Football Federation Islamic Republic of Iran) Foolad
13	DF	Hossein Kanaanizadegan	23 March 1994 (age 32)	59	6	(Football Federation Islamic Republic of Iran) Persepolis
18	DF	Arya Yousefi	22 April 2002 (age 24)	7	0	(Football Federation Islamic Republic of Iran) Sepahan
20	DF	Aref Aghasi	2 January 1997 (age 29)	3	0	(Football Federation Islamic Republic of Iran) Esteghlal
21	DF	Omid Noorafkan	9 April 1997 (age 29)	30	1	(Football Federation Islamic Republic of Iran) Sepahan
23	DF	Ramin Rezaeian	21 March 1990 (age 36)	65	6	(Football Federation Islamic Republic of Iran) Esteghlal
28	DF	Abolfazl Jalali ^{PRE}	26 June 1998 (age 28)	6	0	(Football Federation Islamic Republic of Iran) Esteghlal
	DF	Majid Hosseini ^{PRE}	20 June 1996 (age 30)	28	0	(Turkish Football Federation) Kayserispor
	DF	Danial Esmaeilifar ^{PRE}	18 March 1993 (age 33)	1	0	(Football Federation Islamic Republic of Iran) Tractor
6	MF	Mehdi Tikdari	12 July 1996 (age 30)	0	0	(Football Federation Islamic Republic of Iran) Gol Gohar
7	MF	Alireza Jahanbakhsh	11 August 1993 (age 33)	91	17	Free agent
11	MF	Mohammad Khodabandelou	7 September 1999 (age 27)	0	0	(Football Federation Islamic Republic of Iran) Persepolis
14	MF	Saman Ghoddos	6 September 1993 (age 33)	59	3	(United Arab Emirates Football Association) Ittihad Kalba
15	MF	Rouzbeh Cheshmi	24 July 1993 (age 33)	37	3	(Football Federation Islamic Republic of Iran) Esteghlal
16	MF	Mehdi Hashemnejad	27 October 2001 (age 25)	2	0	(Football Federation Islamic Republic of Iran) Tractor
17	MF	Mehran Ahmadi	26 December 1997 (age 28)	0	0	(Football Federation Islamic Republic of Iran) Esteghlal
19	MF	Majid Aliyari	2 March 1996 (age 30)	0	0	(Football Federation Islamic Republic of Iran) Sepahan
25	MF	Mohammad Mehdi Mohebi	10 February 2000 (age 26)	2	1	(United Arab Emirates Football Association) Ittihad Kalba
26	MF	Mohammad Ghorbani	21 May 2001 (age 25)	7	0	(United Arab Emirates Football Association) Al Wahda
27	MF	Mohammad Mohebi	20 December 1998 (age 27)	28	10	(Russian Football Union) Rostov
	MF	Saeid Ezatolahi ^{PRE}	1 October 1996 (age 30)	77	1	(United Arab Emirates Football Association) Shabab Al Ahli
	MF	Mehdi Ghayedi ^{PRE}	5 December 1998 (age 27)	27	9	(United Arab Emirates Football Association) Al-Nasr
	MF	Allahyar Sayyadmanesh ^{PRE}	29 June 2001 (age 25)	8	1	(Royal Belgian Football Association) Westerlo
	MF	Mehdi Torabi ^{PRE}	10 September 1994 (age 32)	51	7	(Football Federation Islamic Republic of Iran) Tractor
8	FW	Ali Alipour	11 November 1995 (age 30)	5	0	(Football Federation Islamic Republic of Iran) Persepolis
9	FW	Mehdi Taremi	18 July 1992 (age 34)	94	55	(Italian Football Federation) Internazionale (Note: Taremi signed with Olympiacos during the tournament on 31 August 2025.)
10	FW	Amirhossein Hosseinzadeh	30 October 2000 (age 25)	7	1	(Football Federation Islamic Republic of Iran) Tractor
24	FW	Shahriyar Moghanlou	21 December 1994 (age 31)	16	2	(United Arab Emirates Football Association) Ittihad Kalba
	FW	Mohammad Omri ^{PRE}	11 March 2000 (age 26)	0	0	(Football Federation Islamic Republic of Iran) Persepolis
^{PRE} Preliminary squad / standby

== Kyrgyzstan ==
The Kyrgyzstan squad of 35 players was announced by CAFA on 27 August 2025.

Head coach: Urmat Abdukaimov

No.	Pos.	Player	Date of birth (age)	Caps	Goals	Club
1	GK	Erzhan Tokotayev	17 July 2000 (age 26)	36	0	(Uzbekistan Football Association) FC Andijon
13	GK	Artem Pryadkin	18 September 2001 (age 25)	0	0	(Kyrgyz Football Union) FC Bishkek City
16	GK	Ruslan Amirov	14 October 1990 (age 36)	5	0	(Kyrgyz Football Union) Abdysh-Ata Kant
	GK	Omurzak Oronbaev	26 February 2004 (age 22)	0	0	(Kyrgyz Football Union) Ozgon
2	DF	Valery Kichin	12 October 1992 (age 34)	56	6	(Kyrgyz Football Union) Bars Issyk-Kul
3	DF	Tamirlan Kozubaev	1 July 1994 (age 32)	61	2	(Football Association of Indonesia) Persita Tangerang
5	DF	Arlen Beksulov	17 August 2002 (age 24)	0	0	(Kyrgyz Football Union) Talant
14	DF	Aleksandr Mishchenko	30 July 1997 (age 29)	29	0	(Kyrgyz Football Union) Dordoi Bishkek
17	DF	Ulanbek Sulaymanov	8 October 2002 (age 24)	0	0	(Kyrgyz Football Union) Ozgon
19	MF	Ermek Kenzhebayev	3 April 2003 (age 23)	12	0	(Kyrgyz Football Union) Alga Bishkek
20	DF	Esenbek Uson uulu	29 June 1996 (age 30)	0	0	(Kyrgyz Football Union) Neftchi Kochkor-Ata
27	DF	Nurbol Baktybekov	23 February 2004 (age 22)	1	0	(Kyrgyz Football Union) Alga Bishkek
	DF	Aitenir Balbakov	10 January 2005 (age 21)	0	0	(Kyrgyz Football Union) Ilbirs Bishkek
	DF	Amantur Shamurzayev	25 January 2000 (age 26)	6	0	(Football Federation of Belarus) Neman Grodno
	DF	Bektur Amangeldiyev	20 November 1998 (age 27)	0	0	(Kyrgyz Football Union) FC Kyrgyzaltyn
	DF	Abrorbek Askarov	22 August 1999 (age 27)	0	0	(Kyrgyz Football Union) Neftchi Kochkor-Ata
4	MF	Azim Azarov	20 September 1996 (age 30)	6	1	(Kyrgyz Football Union) Muras United
6	MF	Magamed Uzdenov	25 February 1994 (age 32)	8	0	(Kyrgyz Football Union) Bars Issyk-Kul
8	MF	Eldiyar Zarypbekov	14 September 2001 (age 25)	16	1	(Russian Football Union) Chernomorets Novorossiysk
12	MF	Odilzhon Abdurakhmanov	18 March 1996 (age 30)	46	3	(Vietnam Football Federation) Dong A Thanh Hoa
18	MF	Kayrat Zhyrgalbek uulu	13 June 1993 (age 33)	75	4	(Kyrgyz Football Union) Bars Issyk-Kul
22	MF	Amir Zhaparov	25 February 1994 (age 32)	3	0	(Kyrgyz Football Union) Muras United
23	MF	Erbol Atabaev	15 August 2001 (age 25)	21	0	(Kyrgyz Football Union) Abdysh-Ata Kant
24	MF	Nurlan Sarykbaev	29 September 1998 (age 28)	1	0	(Kyrgyz Football Union) Ozgon
25	MF	Islam Yunusov	26 January 2000 (age 26)	0	0	(Kyrgyz Football Union) Muras United
26	MF	Adil Kadyrzhanov	14 July 2000 (age 26)	4	0	(Kyrgyz Football Union) Dordoi Bishkek
	MF	Adilet Kanybekov	25 November 2002 (age 23)	1	0	(Kyrgyz Football Union) FC Bishkek City
	MF	Suyuntbek Mamyraliev	7 January 1998 (age 28)	13	0	(Kyrgyz Football Union) Alga Bishkek
7	FW	Joel Kojo	21 August 1998 (age 28)	26	9	(Uzbekistan Football Association) Neftchi Fergana
9	FW	Ernist Batyrkanov	21 February 1998 (age 28)	33	3	(Kyrgyz Football Union) Dordoi Bishkek
10	FW	Gulzhigit Alykulov	25 November 2000 (age 25)	44	6	(Russian Football Union) Torpedo Moscow
11	FW	Atay Dzhumashev	15 September 1998 (age 28)	5	0	(Kyrgyz Football Union) Muras United
21	FW	Kai Merk	28 August 1998 (age 28)	23	3	(Kyrgyz Football Union) Dordoi Bishkek
	FW	Nurdoolot Stalbekov	13 September 2001 (age 25)	4	0	(Football Federation of Belarus) Isloch Minsk
	FW	Gulzhigit Borubaev	22 April 2000 (age 26)	0	0	(Football Federation of Belarus) Neman Grodno

== Oman ==
The Oman squad of 30 players was announced by OFA on 19 August 2025, and by CAFA on 27 August. Khalid Al-Braiki withdrew injured on 31 August and was replaced by Juma Al-Habsi.

Head coach: (Portugal) Carlos Queiroz

No.	Pos.	Player	Date of birth (age)	Caps	Goals	Club
1	GK	Ibrahim Al-Mukhaini	20 June 1997 (age 29)	44	0	(Oman Football Association) Al-Shabab
18	GK	Faiz Al-Rushaidi (captain)	19 July 1988 (age 38)	79	0	(Oman Football Association) Al-Nahda
22	GK	Ahmed Al-Rawahi	5 May 1994 (age 32)	5	0	(Oman Football Association) Al-Seeb
99	GK	Bilal Al-Balushi	29 May 1996 (age 30)	0	0	(Oman Football Association) Al-Rustaq
2	DF	Ghanim Al-Habashi	4 August 1998 (age 28)	5	0	(Oman Football Association) Al-Nahda
3	DF	Thani Al-Rushaidi	16 March 1995 (age 31)	12	0	(Oman Football Association) Al-Nahda
5	DF	Musab Al-Shaqsy	1 July 2000 (age 26)	2	0	(Oman Football Association) Al-Seeb
6	DF	Ahmed Al-Khamisi	26 November 1991 (age 34)	61	0	(Oman Football Association) Al-Seeb
13	DF	Amjad Al-Harthi	1 January 1994 (age 32)	37	1	(Oman Football Association) Al-Nahda
14	DF	Ahmed Al-Kaabi	15 September 1996 (age 30)	49	0	(Oman Football Association) Al-Nahda
16	DF	Juma Al-Habsi	28 January 1996 (age 30)	32	0	(Oman Football Association) Al-Nasr
17	DF	Ali Al-Busaidi	21 March 1991 (age 35)	102	4	(Oman Football Association) Al-Seeb
27	DF	Mahmood Al-Mushaifri	14 January 1993 (age 33)	32	0	(Oman Football Association) Al-Shabab
	DF	Khalid Al-Braiki ^{INJ}	3 July 1993 (age 33)	35	1	(Football Association of the Czech Republic) Artis Brno
4	MF	Arshad Al-Alawi	12 April 2000 (age 26)	60	8	(Oman Football Association) Al-Seeb
8	MF	Zahir Al-Aghbari	28 May 1999 (age 27)	53	0	(Oman Football Association) Al-Seeb
10	MF	Jameel Al-Yahmadi	27 July 1996 (age 30)	86	4	(Oman Football Association) Al-Shabab
12	MF	Abdullah Fawaz	3 October 1996 (age 30)	57	7	(Oman Football Association) Al-Seeb
19	MF	Hatem Al-Rushadi	15 February 1996 (age 30)	9	0	(Oman Football Association) Al-Shabab
20	MF	Salaah Al-Yahyaei	17 August 1998 (age 28)	67	9	(Oman Football Association) Al-Seeb
23	MF	Harib Al-Saadi	1 February 1990 (age 36)	110	1	(Oman Football Association) Al-Nahda
28	MF	Nasser Al-Rawahi	26 June 2001 (age 25)	3	0	(Oman Football Association) Al-Seeb
29	MF	Musab Al-Mamari	22 January 2000 (age 26)	13	0	(Oman Football Association) Al-Shabab
30	MF	Ahed Al-Mashaiki	30 May 2003 (age 23)	3	0	(Oman Football Association) Al-Nahda
31	MF	Sultan Al-Marzouq	23 October 2004 (age 22)	1	0	(Oman Football Association) Dhofar
33	MF	Ahmed Al-Riyami	9 September 1998 (age 28)	0	0	(Oman Football Association) Al-Shabab
7	FW	Issam Al-Sabhi	1 May 1997 (age 29)	60	16	(Iraq Football Association) Al-Quwa Al-Jawiya
9	FW	Mohammed Al-Ghafri	17 May 1997 (age 29)	24	4	(Oman Football Association) Al-Nahda
11	FW	Muhsen Al-Ghassani	27 March 1997 (age 29)	68	16	(Football Association of Thailand) Bangkok United
15	FW	Rabia Al-Alawi	31 March 1995 (age 31)	41	8	(Jordan Football Association) Al-Wehdat
21	FW	Abdulrahman Al-Mushaifri	16 August 1998 (age 28)	31	8	(Football Association of the Czech Republic) Artis Brno
^{INJ} Excluded from the competition due to injury

== Tajikistan ==
The Tajikistan squad of 35 players was announced by CAFA on 27 August 2025.

Head coach: (Georgia (country)) Gela Shekiladze

No.	Pos.	Player	Date of birth (age)	Caps	Goals	Club
1	GK	Rustam Yatimov	13 July 1998 (aged 27)	47	0	(Russian Football Union) Rostov
23	GK	Mukhriddin Khasanov	23 September 2002 (aged 22)	2	0	(Tajikistan Football Federation) Istiklol
26	GK	Safarmad Ghafforov	14 April 2004 (aged 21)	0	0	(Tajikistan Football Federation) Barkchi Hisor
33	GK	Daler Azizov	19 May 2000 (aged 25)	0	0	(Tajikistan Football Federation) Khosilot Farkhor
	GK	Oleg Baklov	20 October 1994 (aged 30)	6	0	(Russian Football Union) Ufa
2	DF	Zoir Dzhuraboyev	16 September 1998 (aged 26)	51	2	(Uzbekistan Football Association) Sogdiana Jizzakh
3	DF	Tabrez Islomov	6 June 1998 (aged 27)	37	1	(Tajikistan Football Federation) Istiklol
4	DF	Alidzhon Karomatullozoda	5 May 2002 (aged 23)	4	0	(Tajikistan Football Federation) Ravshan Kulob
5	DF	Manuchekhr Safarov	31 May 2001 (aged 24)	50	1	(Tajikistan Football Federation) Istiklol
6	DF	Vahdat Hanonov	25 July 2000 (aged 25)	40	5	(Football Federation Islamic Republic of Iran) Sepahan
19	DF	Akhtam Nazarov	29 September 1992 (aged 32)	93	5	(Tajikistan Football Federation) Istiklol
21	DF	Daler Imomnazarov	31 May 1995 (aged 30)	4	0	(Tajikistan Football Federation) Regar-TadAZ
	DF	Fakhriddin Akhtamov	26 November 2004 (aged 20)	3	0	(Tajikistan Football Federation) Khujand
	DF	Rakhmatsho Rakhmatzoda	6 April 2004 (aged 21)	3	0	(Football Association of Indonesia) PSIM Yogyakarta
7	MF	Parvizdzhon Umarbayev (captain)	1 November 1994 (aged 30)	65	11	(Bulgarian Football Union) Lokomotiv Plovdiv
8	MF	Amirbek Juraboev	13 April 1996 (aged 29)	63	1	(Tajikistan Football Federation) Istiklol
10	MF	Alisher Dzhalilov	29 August 1993 (aged 32)	32	7	(Tajikistan Football Federation) Istiklol
12	MF	Alisher Shukurov	30 March 2002 (aged 23)	12	0	(Tajikistan Football Federation) Khujand
15	MF	Shervoni Mabatshoev	4 December 2000 (aged 24)	33	7	(Tajikistan Football Federation) Regar-TadAZ
17	MF	Ehson Panjshanbe	12 May 1999 (aged 26)	61	6	(Tajikistan Football Federation) Istiklol
18	MF	Shukhrat Elmurodov	31 January 2002 (aged 23)	2	0	(Tajikistan Football Federation) Khujand
20	MF	Mekhron Madaminov	1 May 2002 (aged 23)	0	0	(Tajikistan Football Federation) Barkchi Hisor
	MF	Mukhammadzhon Rakhimov	15 October 1998 (age 28)	50	3	(Tajikistan Football Federation) Istiklol
	MF	Amadoni Kamolov	16 January 2003 (age 23)	14	2	(Football Federation Islamic Republic of Iran) Gol Gohar Sirjan
	MF	Abdurakhmon Nozimov	23 July 1997 (aged 28)	0	0	(Tajikistan Football Federation) Ravshan Kulob
	MF	Khayriddin Turakhonov	24 May 1996 (aged 29)	0	0	(Tajikistan Football Federation) Hulbuk
	MF	Dzhamshed Maksumov	5 May 1999 (aged 26)	0	0	(Tajikistan Football Federation) Ravshan Kulob
	MF	Tokhirdzhon Tagoyzoda	9 October 2001 (aged 23)	0	0	(Tajikistan Football Federation) Vakhsh
9	FW	Rustam Soirov	12 September 2002 (aged 22)	25	5	(Tajikistan Football Federation) Istiklol
11	FW	Nuriddin Khamrokulov	25 October 1999 (aged 25)	26	2	(Tajikistan Football Federation) Vakhsh
14	FW	Sheriddin Boboev	21 April 1999 (aged 26)	23	2	(Tajikistan Football Federation) Ravshan Kulob
22	FW	Shahrom Samiev	8 February 2001 (aged 24)	42	10	(Uzbekistan Football Association) Khorazm
30	MF	Sunatullo Ismoilov	28 April 2002 (aged 23)	0	0	(Tajikistan Football Federation) Vakhsh
	FW	Manuchekhr Dzhalilov	27 September 1990 (aged 34)	54	20	(Tajikistan Football Federation) Istiklol
	FW	Mukhammadikbol Davlatov	13 February 2003 (aged 22)	0	0	(Tajikistan Football Federation) CSKA Pamir Dushanbe

== Turkmenistan ==
The Turkmenistan squad of 24 players was announced by CAFA on 27 August 2025.

Head coach: Röwşen Meredow

No.	Pos.	Player	Date of birth (age)	Caps	Goals	Club
1	GK	Rüstem Ahallyýew	16 November 2002 (age 23)	4	0	(Football Federation of Turkmenistan) Arkadag
16	GK	Muhammet Öwezow	28 May 1995 (age 31)	0	0	(Football Federation of Turkmenistan) Şagadam
22	GK	Rasul Çaryýew	30 September 1999 (age 27)	10	0	(Football Federation of Turkmenistan) Arkadag
2	DF	Güýçmyrat Annagulyýew	10 June 1996 (age 30)	21	2	(Football Federation of Turkmenistan) Arkadag
3	DF	Yhlas Toýjanow	8 January 2001 (age 25)	4	0	(Football Federation of Turkmenistan) Arkadag
4	DF	Bagtyýar Gürgenow	27 February 1998 (age 28)	0	0	(Football Federation of Turkmenistan) Ahal
5	DF	Abdy Bäşimow	12 December 1995 (age 30)	20	1	(Football Federation of Turkmenistan) Arkadag
6	DF	Berdimyrat Rejebow	19 June 1995 (age 31)	4	0	(Football Federation of Turkmenistan) Arkadag
12	DF	Ybraýym Mämmedow	13 January 1996 (age 30)	9	0	(Football Federation of Turkmenistan) Arkadag
15	DF	Wepa Jumaýew	18 December 2000 (age 25)	3	0	(Football Federation of Belarus) Vitebsk
20	DF	Arzuwguly Sapargulýyew	27 July 2001 (age 25)	2	0	(Football Federation of Turkmenistan) Arkadag
8	MF	Ahmet Ataýew	19 September 1990 (age 36)	35	1	(Football Federation of Turkmenistan) Arkadag
9	MF	Gurban Annaýew	10 May 1995 (age 31)	0	0	(Football Federation of Turkmenistan) Ahal
10	MF	Rahman Myratberdiýew	31 October 2001 (age 24)	3	0	(Football Federation of Turkmenistan) Altyn Asyr
17	MF	Mirza Beknazarow	15 May 2000 (age 26)	8	0	(Football Federation of Turkmenistan) Arkadag
18	MF	Yhlas Saparmämmedow	25 February 1997 (age 29)	9	1	(Football Federation of Turkmenistan) Arkadag
21	MF	Ýazgylyç Gurbanow	7 March 1997 (age 29)	7	1	(Football Federation of Turkmenistan) Arkadag
23	MF	Welmyrat Ballakow	4 April 1999 (age 27)	12	0	(Football Federation of Turkmenistan) Arkadag
7	FW	Altymyrat Annadurdyýew	13 April 1993 (age 33)	36	9	(Football Federation of Turkmenistan) Arkadag
11	FW	Didar Durdyýew	16 July 1993 (age 33)	19	2	(Football Federation of Turkmenistan) Arkadag
13	FW	Mihail Titow	18 October 1997 (age 29)	9	2	(Kyrgyz Football Union) Uzgen
14	MF	Şanazar Tirkişow	16 February 1997 (age 29)	13	1	(Football Federation of Turkmenistan) Arkadag
19	FW	Begenç Akmämmedow	1 June 1998 (age 28)	6	0	(Football Federation of Turkmenistan) Arkadag
24	FW	Şamämmet Hydyrow	20 January 2001 (age 25)	0	0	(Football Federation of Turkmenistan) Arkadag

== Uzbekistan ==
The Uzbekistan squad of 35 players was announced by CAFA on 27 August 2025.

Head coach: Timur Kapadze

No.	Pos.	Player	Date of birth (age)	Caps	Goals	Club
1	GK	Utkir Yusupov	4 January 1991 (age 35)	36	0	(Football Federation Islamic Republic of Iran) Foolad
12	GK	Abduvohid Nematov	20 March 2001 (age 25)	7	0	(Uzbekistan Football Association) Nasaf
16	GK	Botirali Ergashev	23 June 1995 (age 31)	2	0	(Uzbekistan Football Association) Neftchi
35	GK	Vladimir Nazarov	8 June 2002 (age 24)	0	0	(Uzbekistan Football Association) Pakhtakor
2	DF	Abdukodir Khusanov	29 February 2004 (age 22)	22	0	(The Football Association) Manchester City
3	DF	Khojiakbar Alijonov	19 April 1997 (age 29)	42	2	(Uzbekistan Football Association) Pakhtakor
4	DF	Farrukh Sayfiev	17 January 1991 (age 35)	61	1	(Uzbekistan Football Association) Neftchi
5	DF	Mukhammadkodir Khamraliev	6 July 2001 (age 25)	1	0	(Uzbekistan Football Association) Pakhtakor
13	DF	Sherzod Nasrullaev	23 July 1998 (age 28)	26	2	(Uzbekistan Football Association) Nasaf
15	DF	Umar Eshmurodov	30 November 1992 (age 33)	35	0	(Uzbekistan Football Association) Nasaf
18	DF	Abdulla Abdullaev	1 September 1997 (age 29)	23	0	(United Arab Emirates Football Association) Al Fujairah
23	DF	Husniddin Aliqulov	4 April 1999 (age 27)	30	3	(Turkish Football Federation) Çaykur Rizespor
24	DF	Ibrokhimkhalil Yuldoshev	14 February 2001 (age 25)	17	1	(Uzbekistan Football Association) Neftchi
25	DF	Avazbek Ulmasaliev	27 March 2000 (age 26)	0	0	(Uzbekistan Football Association) AGMK
27	DF	Dilshod Komilov	16 May 1999 (age 27)	0	0	(Uzbekistan Football Association) Qizilqum
30	DF	Alibek Davronov	28 December 2002 (age 23)	3	0	(Uzbekistan Football Association) Nasaf
33	DF	Dilshod Saitov	2 February 1999 (age 27)	7	0	(Uzbekistan Football Association) Pakhtakor
6	MF	Akmal Mozgovoy	2 April 2000 (age 26)	15	0	(United Arab Emirates Football Association) Baniyas
7	MF	Otabek Shukurov	22 June 1996 (age 30)	77	8	(Saudi Arabian Football Federation) Al-Fayha
8	MF	Jamshid Iskanderov	16 October 1993 (age 33)	37	4	(Uzbekistan Football Association) Neftchi
9	MF	Odiljon Hamrobekov	13 February 1996 (age 30)	63	1	(Football Federation Islamic Republic of Iran) Tractor
10	MF	Azizjon Ganiev	22 February 1998 (age 28)	15	0	(United Arab Emirates Football Association) Al Bataeh
11	MF	Oston Urunov	19 December 2000 (age 25)	33	8	(Football Federation Islamic Republic of Iran) Persepolis
17	MF	Abdurauf Buriev	20 July 2002 (age 24)	3	0	(Uzbekistan Football Association) Pakhtakor
19	MF	Azizbek Turgunboev	1 October 1994 (age 32)	36	5	(Uzbekistan Football Association) Pakhtakor
20	MF	Khojimat Erkinov	29 May 2001 (age 25)	35	5	(Uzbekistan Football Association) Pakhtakor
22	MF	Abbosbek Fayzullaev	3 October 2003 (age 23)	27	8	(Turkish Football Federation) İstanbul Başakşehir
26	MF	Diyor Kholmatov	22 July 2002 (age 24)	4	0	(Uzbekistan Football Association) Pakhtakor
29	MF	Abror Ismoilov	8 January 1998 (age 28)	11	0	(Uzbekistan Football Association) Neftchi
31	MF	Ruslanbek Jiyanov	5 June 2001 (age 25)	3	0	(Uzbekistan Football Association) Navbahor
34	MF	Ibrokhim Ibrokhimov	12 January 2001 (age 25)	0	0	(Uzbekistan Football Association) Pakhtakor
14	FW	Eldor Shomurodov (captain)	29 June 1995 (age 31)	82	42	(Turkish Football Federation) İstanbul Başakşehir
21	FW	Igor Sergeev	30 April 1993 (age 33)	74	20	(Uzbekistan Football Association) Pakhtakor
28	FW	Alisher Odilov	15 July 2001 (age 25)	0	0	(Uzbekistan Football Association) Neftchi
32	FW	Khusayin Norchaev	6 February 2002 (age 24)	1	1	(Uzbekistan Football Association) Nasaf
