= 2023 AFC Asian Cup Group F =

Group F of the 2023 AFC Asian Cup took place from 16 to 25 January 2024. The group consisted of Saudi Arabia, Thailand, Kyrgyzstan and Oman. The top two teams, Saudi Arabia and Thailand, advanced to the round of 16.

== Teams ==
Draw position	Team	Zone	Method of qualification	Date of qualification	Finals appearance	Last appearance	Previous best performance	FIFA Rankings	
Draw position	Team	Zone	Method of qualification	Date of qualification	Finals appearance	Last appearance	Previous best performance	April 2023 (Note: The rankings of April 2023 were used for seeding for the final draw.)	December 2023
F1	Saudi Arabia	WAFF	Second round Group D winners	15 June 2021	11th	2019	Winners (1984, 1988, 1996)	54	56
F2	Thailand	AFF	Third round Group C runners-up	14 June 2022	8th	2019	Third place (1972)	114	113
F3	Kyrgyzstan	CAFA	Third round Group F runners-up	14 June 2022	2nd	2019	Round of 16 (2019)	96	98
F4	Oman	WAFF	Second round Group E runners-up	15 June 2021	5th	2019	Round of 16 (2019)	73	74

== Standings ==
Pos	Team	Pld	W	D	L	GF	GA	GD	Pts	Qualification
1	Saudi Arabia	3	2	1	0	4	1	+3	7	Advance to knockout stage
2	Thailand	3	1	2	0	2	0	+2	5	Advance to knockout stage
3	Oman	3	0	2	1	2	3	−1	2	
4	Kyrgyzstan	3	0	1	2	1	5	−4	1	

Source: AFC
Rules for classification: Group stage tiebreakers

== Matches ==
=== Thailand vs Kyrgyzstan ===
Thailand and Kyrgyzstan only met each other just once, a friendly in 2001 where Thailand won 3–1.

Thailand quickly proved their worth with an offside goal in the 15th minute, before dealing a fatal blow to Kyrgyzstan in the 26th minute when Bordin Phala delivered a long-range shot, then Supachai Chaided quickly approached the ball following a deflection from Erzhan Tokotayev's save to hit the net and give Thailand the lead. Chaided then closed the game in the 49th minute when in a major offensive, Theerathon Bunmathan delivered a spectacular high pass for Phala, who then provided a fickle for Supachok Sarachat to take a header; despite the header hitting the back of Tamirlan Kozubaev, Chaided was quick to approach before sending the ball to the net. Thailand then set up an extremely effective defence to neutralise opportunities of Kyrgyzstan as the Thais held firm for the win.

This was the first time Thailand won an opening match of the AFC Asian Cup, with their best record prior to this historic win being three draws and four losses.

16 January 2024
17:30

Thailand	2–0	Kyrgyzstan
Supachai 26', 48'	Report

Abdullah bin Khalifa Stadium, Doha
Attendance: 4,530
Referee: Adham Makhadmeh (Jordan)

Thailand	Kyrgyzstan

GK	23	Patiwat Khammai
RB	12	Nicholas Mickelson	(yellow card) 81'
CB	4	Elias Dolah
CB	17	Pansa Hemviboon
LB	3	Theerathon Bunmathan (c)	(yellow card) 8'
CM	25	Peeradol Chamrasamee		(substituted off) 46'
CM	18	Weerathep Pomphan
RW	10	Suphanat Mueanta		(substituted off) 69'
AM	7	Supachok Sarachat		(substituted off) 88'
LW	11	Bordin Phala		(substituted off) 69'
CF	9	Supachai Chaided		(substituted off) 78'
Substitutions:
MF	6	Sarach Yooyen		(substituted on) 46'
MF	19	Pathompol Charoenrattanapirom		(substituted on) 69'
MF	13	Jaroensak Wonggorn	(yellow card) 90+7'	(substituted on) 69'
FW	15	Teerasak Poeiphimai		(substituted on) 78'
MF	24	Worachit Kanitsribampen		(substituted on) 88'
Manager:
(Japan) Masatada Ishii

GK	1	Erzhan Tokotayev
RB	18	Kayrat Zhyrgalbek uulu
CB	3	Tamirlan Kozubaev (c)
CB	5	Ayzar Akmatov		(substituted off) 75'
LB	11	Bekzhan Sagynbayev
RM	15	Kai Merk		(substituted off) 54'
CM	12	Odilzhon Abdurakhmanov
CM	20	Bakhtiyar Duyshobekov		(substituted off) 46'
LM	10	Gulzhigit Alykulov	(yellow card) 21'	(substituted off) 69'
CF	7	Joel Kojo		(substituted off) 69'
CF	24	Kimi Merk
Substitutions:
MF	21	Farkhat Musabekov		(substituted on) 46'
DF	2	Khristiyan Brauzman		(substituted on) 54'
FW	9	Ernist Batyrkanov	(yellow card) 90+3'	(substituted on) 69'
MF	19	Beknaz Almazbekov		(substituted on) 69'
DF	17	Suyuntbek Mamyraliev		(substituted on) 75'
Manager:
(Slovakia) Štefan Tarkovič

Man of the Match:
Patiwat Khammai (Thailand)

Assistant referees:
Mohammad Al-Kalaf (Jordan)
Ahmad Al-Roalle (Jordan)
Fourth official:
Kim Hee-gon (South Korea)
Reserve assistant referee:
Kim Kyoung-min (South Korea)
Video assistant referee:
Adel Al-Naqbi (United Arab Emirates)
Assistant video assistant referees:
Hasan Al-Mahri (United Arab Emirates)

=== Saudi Arabia vs Oman ===
Saudi Arabia and Oman faced each other in the Asian Cup for the first time. In competitive fixtures, Saudi Arabia had never lost to Oman, with two draws and two wins, which their most recent encounters happened during the 2022 FIFA World Cup qualification, which Saudi Arabia gained 1–0 win each.

The match kickstarted in high tempo as Oman surprised Saudi Arabia with their energetic midfield group. At the ninth minute, a failed corner attempt by the Saudis saw Salaah Al-Yahyaei pull a speedy run into the Saudi defence before his effort was denied, but not without his teammate Muhsen Al-Ghassani's quick incursion into the Saudi penalty area, during which his feet got stomped by Hassan Al-Tambakti; later VAR decision gave Oman the penalty, and Al-Yahyaei didn't miss the opportunity at the 15th minute. Later, Oman set up a highly cohesive defence system to deny Saudi Arabia from scoring, but it could not withstand in the 78th minute when from the midfield, Mohamed Kanno passed back to Ali Lajami, who then set up a decisive pass for Abdulrahman Ghareeb as he successfully soloed over a rain of Omani defenders before curving beautifully to level the score. Drama came in the sixth minute of extra time in the second half, when from a corner from Ghareeb sent to Lajami, who then gave a high pass to Ali Al-Bulaihi as he headed into the net of Ibrahim Al-Mukhaini; initially, the goal was disallowed for offside before it was thought to withstand due to a misunderstanding between the VAR team and the referee, only for the decision to be reversed as the Saudis triumphed in a hard-fought match, leaving Omani players in despair with this devastating loss.

16 January 2024
20:30

Saudi Arabia	2–1	Oman
Ghareeb 78'; Al-Bulaihi 90+6'	Report	Al-Yahyaei 14' (pen.)

Khalifa International Stadium, Al Rayyan
Attendance: 41,987
Referee: Shaun Evans (Australia)

Saudi Arabia	Oman

GK	22	Ahmed Al-Kassar
CB	17	Hassan Al-Tambakti	(yellow card) 13'
CB	4	Ali Lajami
CB	5	Ali Al-Bulaihi
RM	12	Saud Abdulhamid
CM	16	Sami Al-Najei		(substituted off) 63'
CM	15	Abdullah Al-Khaibari		(substituted off) 75'
CM	23	Mohamed Kanno		(substituted off) 83'
LM	24	Nasser Al-Dawsari
CF	11	Saleh Al-Shehri		(substituted off) 75'
CF	10	Salem Al-Dawsari (c)		(substituted off) 83'
Substitutions:
FW	20	Abdullah Radif		(substituted on) 63'
MF	18	Abdulrahman Ghareeb		(substituted on) 75'
MF	7	Mukhtar Ali		(substituted on) 75'
MF	26	Faisal Al-Ghamdi		(substituted on) 83'
FW	9	Firas Al-Buraikan		(substituted on) 83'
Manager:
(Italy) Roberto Mancini

GK	1	Ibrahim Al-Mukhaini
RB	4	Arshad Al-Alawi
CB	16	Khalid Al-Braiki
CB	6	Ahmed Al-Khamisi
LB	14	Ahmed Al-Kaabi
DM	23	Harib Al-Saadi (c)
CM	10	Jameel Al-Yahmadi
CM	12	Abdullah Fawaz	(substituted off) 73'
AM	20	Salaah Al-Yahyaei	(substituted off) 78'
CF	7	Issam Al-Sabhi	(substituted off) 46'
CF	11	Muhsen Al-Ghassani	(substituted off) 73'
Substitutions:
MF	13	Mataz Saleh	(substituted on) 46'
MF	24	Tamim Al-Balushi	(substituted on) 73'	(substituted off) 87'
FW	26	Abdulrahman Al-Mushaifri	(substituted on) 73'
MF	3	Fahmi Durbin	(substituted on) 78'
DF	17	Ali Al-Busaidi	(substituted on) 87'
Manager:
(Croatia) Branko Ivanković

Man of the Match:
Salaah Al-Yahyaei (Oman)

Assistant referees:
Anton Shchetinin (Australia)
Ashley Beecham (Australia)
Fourth official:
Abdullah Jamali (Kuwait)
Reserve assistant referee:
Ahmad Abbas (Kuwait)
Video assistant referee:
Kate Jacewicz (Australia)
Assistant video assistant referees:
Jumpei Iida (Japan)

=== Oman vs Thailand ===
Oman and Thailand had faced each other 12 times with Oman slightly dominating Thailand with six wins to five. In term of Asian Cup meetings however, Thailand and Oman are equal, with the most recent Asian Cup meeting in 2007 ended with Thailand winning 2–0. However, the most recent competitive fixture, as part of the 2014 FIFA World Cup qualification, saw Oman triumph 2–0. All five Thai wins over Oman happened at home and none had ever occurred in Omani or neutral ground.

The match started with Thailand surprisingly going offensive and a dangerous header from Elias Dolah at the 16th minute of the match saw his header denied by Ibrahim Al-Mukhaini before it went wild. Oman gradually reasserted control of the match but not until the second half that they relentlessly put Thailand on the defence, in particular with numerous attacking efforts, but none of the Omani strikers could clinically finish the game as Oman were forced to settle with a draw to an increasingly conservative Thai side that laid low to successfully hold the scoreline goalless.

It was the first time ever Thailand managed to have two consecutive clean sheets at the AFC Asian Cup, a feat never achieved in their participation history, although Thailand remained unable to break the poor record in neutral and away ground to Oman (drawn two, lost five).

21 January 2024
17:30

Oman	0–0	Thailand
	Report

Abdullah bin Khalifa Stadium, Doha
Attendance: 6,340
Referee: Mooud Bonyadifard (Iran)

Oman	Thailand

GK	1	Ibrahim Al-Mukhaini
RB	4	Arshad Al-Alawi	(substituted off) 67'
CB	16	Khalid Al-Braiki
CB	6	Ahmed Al-Khamisi
LB	14	Ahmed Al-Kaabi
DM	23	Harib Al-Saadi (c)
CM	10	Jameel Al-Yahmadi
CM	12	Abdullah Fawaz	(substituted off) 67'
AM	20	Salaah Al-Yahyaei
CF	11	Muhsen Al-Ghassani	(substituted off) 90'
CF	7	Issam Al-Sabhi	(substituted off) 81'
Substitutions:
FW	26	Abdulrahman Al-Mushaifri	(substituted on) 67'
FW	8	Zahir Al-Aghbari	(substituted on) 67'
MF	9	Omar Al-Malki	(substituted on) 81'
FW	25	Abdullah Al-Mushaifri	(substituted on) 90'
Manager:
(Croatia) Branko Ivanković

GK	23	Patiwat Khammai
RB	12	Nicholas Mickelson
CB	4	Elias Dolah
CB	17	Pansa Hemviboon
LB	3	Theerathon Bunmathan (c)	(yellow card) 57'
CM	25	Peeradol Chamrasamee		(substituted off) 90'
CM	18	Weerathep Pomphan		(substituted off) 86'
RW	10	Suphanat Mueanta		(substituted off) 86'
AM	7	Supachok Sarachat
LW	11	Bordin Phala		(substituted off) 71'
CF	9	Supachai Chaided
Substitutions:
MF	13	Jaroensak Wonggorn		(substituted on) 71'
MF	19	Pathompol Charoenrattanapirom		(substituted on) 86'
DF	21	Suphanan Bureerat		(substituted on) 86'
MF	6	Sarach Yooyen		(substituted on) 90'
Manager:
(Japan) Masatada Ishii

Man of the Match:
Salaah Al-Yahyaei (Oman)

Assistant referees:
Saeid Ghasemi (Iran)
Alireza Ildorom (Iran)
Fourth official:
Alireza Faghani (Australia)
Reserve assistant referee:
Abdul Hannan Bin Abdul Hasim (Singapore)
Video assistant referee:
Mohammed Abdulla Hassan Mohamed (United Arab Emirates)
Assistant video assistant referees:
Muhammad Taqi (Singapore)

=== Kyrgyzstan vs Saudi Arabia ===
Kyrgyzstan only met Saudi Arabia twice, both during the 1996 AFC Asian Cup qualification, which Saudi Arabia won 5–0 on aggregate.

Saudi Arabia got off to a dream start when a brutal foul by Ayzar Akmatov on Sami Al-Najei near Kyrgyzstan's penalty area at the 7th minute resulted in his dismissal. With one-man advantage, Saudi Arabia eventually broke through at the 35th minute when from a long-range shot by Abdulellah Al-Malki, the ball hit the right post before it deflected to Saud Abdulhamid, before Abdulhamid gave the ball to Mohamed Kanno with a clinical close-range pass and Kanno volleyed into the net. Things only became better for the Saudis when another dangerous foul from Kimi Merk on Hassan Al-Tambakti at the 50th minute resulted in Kyrgyzstan reduce to nine men. Despite massive numerical advantage however, it was not until the 85th minute when, from a failed clearance by the Kyrgyz midfielders, the ball was sent to Faisal Al-Ghamdi from Mukhtar Ali, before Al-Ghamdi scored a rather lucky goal when Erzhan Tokotayev's attempt to punch the ball away instead hit home to secure Saudi Arabia's win.

21 January 2024
20:30

Kyrgyzstan	0–2	Saudi Arabia
	Report	Kanno 35'; Al-Ghamdi 84'

Ahmad bin Ali Stadium, Al Rayyan
Attendance: 39,557
Referee: Jumpei Iida (Japan)

Kyrgyzstan	Saudi Arabia

GK	1	Erzhan Tokotayev
CB	2	Khristiyan Brauzman	(yellow card) 22'
CB	3	Tamirlan Kozubaev
CB	5	Ayzar Akmatov	(red card) 9'
RM	14	Aleksandr Mishchenko	(yellow card) 42'
CM	12	Odilzhon Abdurakhmanov		(substituted off) 73'
CM	24	Kimi Merk	(red card) 52'
LM	11	Bekzhan Sagynbayev		(substituted off) 87'
RF	18	Kayrat Zhyrgalbek uulu (c)		(substituted off) 73'
CF	9	Ernist Batyrkanov		(substituted off) 64'
LF	10	Gulzhigit Alykulov		(substituted off) 64'
Substitutions:
DF	20	Bakhtiyar Duyshobekov		(substituted on) 64'
MF	23	Nurdoolot Stalbekov		(substituted on) 64'
MF	15	Kai Merk		(substituted on) 73'
MF	4	Adil Kadyrzhanov		(substituted on) 73'
DF	6	Amantur Shamurzaev		(substituted on) 87'
Manager:
(Slovakia) Štefan Tarkovič

GK	22	Ahmed Al-Kassar
CB	17	Hassan Al-Tambakti		(substituted off) 54'
CB	4	Ali Lajami
CB	5	Ali Al-Bulaihi
RM	12	Saud Abdulhamid
CM	8	Abdulellah Al-Malki		(substituted off) 77'
CM	23	Mohamed Kanno
LM	25	Mohammed Al-Breik
RF	16	Sami Al-Najei		(substituted off) 64'
CF	9	Firas Al-Buraikan		(substituted off) 77'
LF	10	Salem Al-Dawsari (c)		(substituted off) 64'
Substitutions:
FW	11	Saleh Al-Shehri	(yellow card) 63'	(substituted on) 54'
MF	18	Abdulrahman Ghareeb		(substituted on) 64'
FW	20	Abdullah Radif		(substituted on) 64'
MF	7	Mukhtar Ali		(substituted on) 77'
MF	26	Faisal Al-Ghamdi		(substituted on) 77'
Manager:
(Italy) Roberto Mancini

Man of the Match:
Saud Abdulhamid (Saudi Arabia)

Assistant referees:
Jun Mihara (Japan)
Takumi Takagi (Japan)
Fourth official:
Ma Ning (China)
Reserve assistant referee:
Zhou Fei (China)
Video assistant referee:
Fu Ming (China)
Assistant video assistant referees:
Yusuke Araki (Japan)

=== Saudi Arabia vs Thailand ===
Saudi Arabia and Thailand had met each other 16 times, with Saudi Arabia overwhelmingly dominant with 14 wins. In Asian Cup finals, Saudi Arabia met Thailand twice in 1992 and 1996, both times the Saudis won. Saudi Arabia had been more dominant than Thailand in other competitive fixtures, with their most recent meetings during the 2018 FIFA World Cup qualification ended with Saudi Arabia winning 4–0 on aggregate.

The first attempt for the back of the net came from Abdullah Radif's penalty, following an earlier foul by Suphan Thongsong on Abdulrahman Ghareeb, but Radif squandered the opportunity. The match then went to the most bizarre way in the competition as possible, with Saudi Arabia and Thailand, having rotated most of their teams due to their early progressions, scored four times only to be disallowed all by VAR; first, Jaroensak Wonggorn's pass for Teerasak Poeiphimai's header was disallowed for Teerasak's offside at the 15th minute; followed by Radif's goal with the provide by Abdullah Al-Khaibari just a minute later also disallowed; then, at the 35th minute, from a curl to the penalty area by Santiphap Channgom, Teerasak headed to Worachit Kanitsribampen to score only to again ruled out for offside; before it finally ended with Al-Khaibari's long-range pass for Ghareeb to sprint over and score only to end up ruled out again at the 57th minute, as both teams were forced to settle for a draw despite consistent Saudi domination and pressure.

With this outcome, it marked Thailand's best ever AFC Asian Cup performance, with three consecutive shutouts and the first time ever they advanced past two consecutive Asian Cup group stages, both were Thailand's first in their participation history. It was also the first time since the 2014 FIFA World Cup qualification that Thailand did not lose to Saudi Arabia in a competitive fixture, and also the first in the history that Thailand did not lose to Saudi Arabia at the AFC Asian Cup.

25 January 2024
18:00

Saudi Arabia	0–0	Thailand
	Report

Education City Stadium, Al Rayyan
Attendance: 38,773
Referee: Kim Hee-gon (South Korea)

Saudi Arabia	Thailand

GK	21	Raghed Al-Najjar
CB	15	Abdullah Al-Khaibari
CB	3	Awn Al-Saluli
CB	5	Ali Al-Bulaihi
RM	2	Fawaz Al-Sqoor		(substituted off) 79'
CM	26	Faisal Al-Ghamdi		(substituted off) 64'
CM	7	Mukhtar Ali		(substituted off) 87'
CM	10	Salem Al-Dawsari (c)
LM	13	Hassan Kadesh		(substituted off) 64'
CF	20	Abdullah Radif		(substituted off) 64'
CF	18	Abdulrahman Ghareeb	(yellow card) 35'
Substitutions:
MF	24	Nasser Al-Dawsari		(substituted on) 64'
DF	25	Mohammed Al-Breik		(substituted on) 64'
FW	14	Talal Haji		(substituted on) 64'
MF	23	Mohamed Kanno		(substituted on) 79'
FW	11	Saleh Al-Shehri		(substituted on) 87'
Manager:
(Italy) Roberto Mancini

GK	20	Saranon Anuin
RB	21	Suphanan Bureerat
CB	26	Suphan Thongsong
CB	16	Jakkapan Praisuwan
LB	2	Santiphap Channgom
CM	5	Kritsada Kaman	(substituted off) 65'
CM	6	Sarach Yooyen (c)
RW	13	Jaroensak Wonggorn	(substituted off) 88'
AM	24	Worachit Kanitsribampen	(substituted off) 74'
LW	19	Pathompol Charoenrattanapirom	(substituted off) 88'
CF	15	Teerasak Poeiphimai	(substituted off) 74'
Substitutions:
MF	18	Weerathep Pomphan	(substituted on) 65'
FW	9	Supachai Chaided	(substituted on) 74'
MF	25	Peeradol Chamrasamee	(substituted on) 74'
MF	14	Rungrath Poomchantuek	(substituted on) 88'
MF	22	Channarong Promsrikaew	(substituted on) 88'
Manager:
(Japan) Masatada Ishii

Man of the Match:
Saranon Anuin (Thailand)

Assistant referees:
Yoon Jae-yeol (South Korea)
Park Sang-jun (South Korea)
Fourth official:
Ilgiz Tantashev (Uzbekistan)
Reserve assistant referee:
Timur Gaynullin (Uzbekistan)
Video assistant referee:
Kim Jong-hyeok (South Korea)
Assistant video assistant referees:
Ko Hyung-jin (South Korea)

=== Kyrgyzstan vs Oman ===
Kyrgyzstan and Oman faced each other in a competitive Asian Cup finals for the first time. In term of competitive fixtures, they met twice, the most recent one occurred during the 2026 FIFA World Cup qualification where Kyrgyzstan shocked Oman with a 1–0 win.

Oman started on a bright note when, from a perfectly combined corner kick, Muhsen Al-Ghassani headed home at the eighth minute following chaotic attempts by both the Kyrgyz and Omanis to gain field; VAR later confirmed after the ball landed over the line. Oman then poured even further pressure to find further goals, but as Oman wasted numerous opportunities later on, warnings of cracks on Omani defence started to appear when at the 47th minute Joel Kojo, receiving a deliver from Bakhtiyar Duyshobekov, headed home only to be found offside. Eventually, Oman were made to pay at the 80th minute, when from a long-range delivery by Farkhat Musabekov, Khalid Al-Braiki and Ibrahim Al-Mukhaini miscommunicated to each other while trying to prevent Kojo, allowing Kojo to find the back of the net at the disbelief of Al-Mukhaini. Despite further attempts, none could find goal as they were forced to end their tournament at the group stages.

This result meant Kyrgyzstan failed to advance past the group stage for the first time after successfully advancing at their debut in 2019. For Oman, this was their worst AFC Asian Cup performance since the 2007 edition, both winning just two points.

25 January 2024
18:00

Kyrgyzstan	1–1	Oman
Kojo 80'	Report	Al-Ghassani 8'

Abdullah bin Khalifa Stadium, Doha
Attendance: 6,231
Referee: Ahmad Al-Ali (Kuwait)

Kyrgyzstan	Oman

GK	1	Erzhan Tokotayev
CB	2	Khristiyan Brauzman
CB	3	Tamirlan Kozubaev (c)
CB	20	Bakhtiyar Duyshobekov
RM	14	Aleksandr Mishchenko		(substituted off) 88'
CM	21	Farkhat Musabekov		(substituted off) 88'
CM	12	Odilzhon Abdurakhmanov
LM	17	Suyuntbek Mamyraliev		(substituted off) 46'
RF	9	Ernist Batyrkanov		(substituted off) 90+1'
CF	7	Joel Kojo
LF	10	Gulzhigit Alykulov	(yellow card) 43'	(substituted off) 46'
Substitutions:
MF	15	Kai Merk		(substituted on) 46'
MF	19	Beknaz Almazbekov	(yellow card) 78'	(substituted on) 46'
MF	4	Adil Kadyrzhanov		(substituted on) 88'
DF	6	Amantur Shamurzaev		(substituted on) 88'
MF	23	Nurdoolot Stalbekov		(substituted on) 90+1'
Manager:
(Slovakia) Štefan Tarkovič

GK	1	Ibrahim Al-Mukhaini
RB	4	Arshad Al-Alawi		(substituted off) 89'
CB	16	Khalid Al-Braiki
CB	6	Ahmed Al-Khamisi	(yellow card) 4'	(substituted off) 31'
LB	14	Ahmed Al-Kaabi
DM	23	Harib Al-Saadi (c)
CM	10	Jameel Al-Yahmadi	(yellow card) 90+2'
CM	12	Abdullah Fawaz		(substituted off) 67'
AM	20	Salaah Al-Yahyaei
CF	26	Abdulrahman Al-Mushaifri
CF	11	Muhsen Al-Ghassani		(substituted off) 67'
Substitutions:
MF	3	Fahmi Durbin		(substituted on) 31'
FW	7	Issam Al-Sabhi		(substituted on) 67'
FW	8	Zahir Al-Aghbari		(substituted on) 67'
FW	25	Abdullah Al-Mushaifri		(substituted on) 89'
Manager:
(Croatia) Branko Ivanković

Man of the Match:
Salaah Al-Yahyaei (Oman)

Assistant referees:
Abdulhadi Al-Anezi (Kuwait)
Ahmad Abbas (Kuwait)
Fourth official:
Adham Makhadmeh (Jordan)
Reserve assistant referee:
Mohammad Al-Kalaf (Jordan)
Video assistant referee:
Abdullah Jamali (Kuwait)
Assistant video assistant referees:
Shaun Evans (Australia)

== Discipline ==
Fair play points would have been used as tiebreakers if the overall and head-to-head records of teams were tied. These were calculated based on yellow and red cards received in all group matches as follows:

- first yellow card: −1 point;
- indirect red card (second yellow card): −3 points;
- direct red card: −3 points;
- yellow card and direct red card: −4 points;

Only one of the above deductions was applied to a player in a single match.

Team	Match 1				Match 2				Match 3				Points
Team	Booked	(yellow card) (yellow-red card)	Sent off (straight red)	(yellow card) (red card)	Booked	(yellow card) (yellow-red card)	Sent off (straight red)	(yellow card) (red card)	Booked	(yellow card) (yellow-red card)	Sent off (straight red)	(yellow card) (red card)	Points
Oman									2				–2
Saudi Arabia	1				1				1				–3
Thailand	3				1								–4
Kyrgyzstan	2				2		2		2				–12
