= Kyrgyzstan at the AFC Asian Cup =

National football delegation

Kyrgyzstan, since independence from the Soviet Union, has struggled to qualify for the AFC Asian Cup. Not considering to be a top team, Kyrgyzstan was regarded as a weaker team, prior to the 2010s.

However, since the 2010s, with the subsequent managerial developments, especially from German and Russian managers, Kyrgyzstan has changed rapidly, and has emerged to become one of the better teams in the continent. Eventually, Kyrgyzstan registered history, by qualifying to their first ever Asian Cup, in 2019. This successful achievement of Kyrgyzstan was deemed to have a positive impact to the nation, which is mostly known for wrestling and traditional archery.

== 2019 AFC Asian Cup ==
=== Group C ===
Pos	Team	Pld	W	D	L	GF	GA	GD	Pts	Qualification
1	South Korea	3	3	0	0	4	0	+4	9	Advance to knockout stage
2	China	3	2	0	1	5	3	+2	6	Advance to knockout stage
3	Kyrgyzstan	3	1	0	2	4	4	0	3	Advance to knockout stage
4	Philippines	3	0	0	3	1	7	−6	0	

Source: AFC
7 January 2019
15:00

China	2–1	Kyrgyzstan
Matyash 50' (o.g.); Yu Dabao 78'	Report	Israilov 42'

Khalifa bin Zayed Stadium, Al Ain
Attendance: 1,839
Referee: Mohammed Abdulla Hassan Mohamed (United Arab Emirates)

11 January 2019
20:00

Kyrgyzstan	0–1	South Korea
	Report	Kim Min-jae 41'

Hazza bin Zayed Stadium, Al Ain
Attendance: 4,893
Referee: Khamis Al-Marri (Qatar)

16 January 2019
17:30

Kyrgyzstan	3–1	Philippines
Lux 24', 51', 77'	Report	Schröck 80'

Rashid Stadium, Dubai
Attendance: 4,217
Referee: Turki Al-Khudhayr (Saudi Arabia)

Ranking of third-placed teams

Pos	Grp	Team	Pld	W	D	L	GF	GA	GD	Pts	Qualification
1	A	Bahrain	3	1	1	1	2	2	0	4	Advance to knockout stage
2	C	Kyrgyzstan	3	1	0	2	4	4	0	3 (Note: Disciplinary points: Kyrgyzstan −5, Oman −6.)	Advance to knockout stage
3	F	Oman	3	1	0	2	4	4	0	3	Advance to knockout stage
4	D	Vietnam	3	1	0	2	4	5	−1	3 (Note: Disciplinary points: Vietnam −5, Lebanon −7.)	Advance to knockout stage
5	E	Lebanon	3	1	0	2	4	5	−1	3	
6	B	Palestine	3	0	2	1	0	3	−3	2	

Source: AFC

=== Knockout stage ===
==== Round of 16 ====
21 January 2019
21:00

United Arab Emirates	3–2 (a.e.t.)	Kyrgyzstan
Esmaeel 14'; Mabkhout 64'; Khalil 103' (pen.)	Report	Murzaev 26'; Rustamov 90+1'

Zayed Sports City Stadium, Abu Dhabi
Attendance: 17,784
Referee: Fu Ming (China PR)

== 2023 AFC Asian Cup ==
=== Group F ===
Pos	Team	Pld	W	D	L	GF	GA	GD	Pts	Qualification
1	Saudi Arabia	3	2	1	0	4	1	+3	7	Advance to knockout stage
2	Thailand	3	1	2	0	2	0	+2	5	Advance to knockout stage
3	Oman	3	0	2	1	2	3	−1	2	
4	Kyrgyzstan	3	0	1	2	1	5	−4	1	

Source: AFC
16 January 2024
17:30

Thailand	2–0	Kyrgyzstan
Supachai 26', 48'	Report

Abdullah bin Khalifa Stadium, Doha
Attendance: 4,530
Referee: Adham Makhadmeh (Jordan)

21 January 2024
20:30

Kyrgyzstan	0–2	Saudi Arabia
	Report	Kanno 35'; Al-Ghamdi 84'

Ahmad bin Ali Stadium, Al Rayyan
Attendance: 39,557
Referee: Jumpei Iida (Japan)

25 January 2024
18:00

Kyrgyzstan	1–1	Oman
Kojo 80'	Report	Al-Ghassani 8'

Abdullah bin Khalifa Stadium, Doha
Attendance: 6,231
Referee: Ahmad Al-Ali (Kuwait)

== Asian Cup performance ==
AFC Asian Cup record									Qualification record					
Year	Result	Position	Pld	W	D	L	GF	GA	Pld	W	D*	L	GF	GA
1956 to 1992	Part of Soviet Union								Part of Soviet Union					
(United Arab Emirates) 1996	Did not qualify								4	1	0	3	3	7
(Lebanon) 2000	Did not qualify								3	0	0	3	3	11
(China) 2004	Did not qualify								2	1	0	1	3	2
(Indonesia) (Malaysia) (Thailand) (Vietnam) 2007	Did not enter								Did not enter					
(Qatar) 2011	Did not qualify								2010 AFC Challenge Cup was used to determine qualification					
(Australia) 2015	Did not qualify								2012 and 2014 AFC Challenge Cup were used to determine qualification					
(United Arab Emirates) 2019	Round of 16	15th	4	1	0	3	6	7	14	8	3	3	26	17
(Qatar) 2023	Group stage	20th	3	0	1	2	1	5	11	5	2	4	23	13
(Saudi Arabia) 2027	Qualified								6	3	2	1	13	7
Total	3/19	Best: 15th	7	1	1	5	7	12	40	18	7	15	81	57

== Head-to-head record ==
Opponent	Pld	W	D	L	GF	GA	GD	Win %
China	1	0	0	1	1	2	−1	0.00
Oman	1	0	1	0	1	1	+0	0.00
Philippines	1	1	0	0	3	1	+2	100.00
Saudi Arabia	1	0	0	1	0	2	−2	0.00
South Korea	1	0	0	1	0	1	−1	0.00
Thailand	1	0	0	1	0	2	−2	0.00
United Arab Emirates	1	0	0	1	2	3	−1	0.00
Total	7	1	1	5	7	12	−5	14.29
