= Utkir Yusupov =

Uzbek footballer (born 1991)

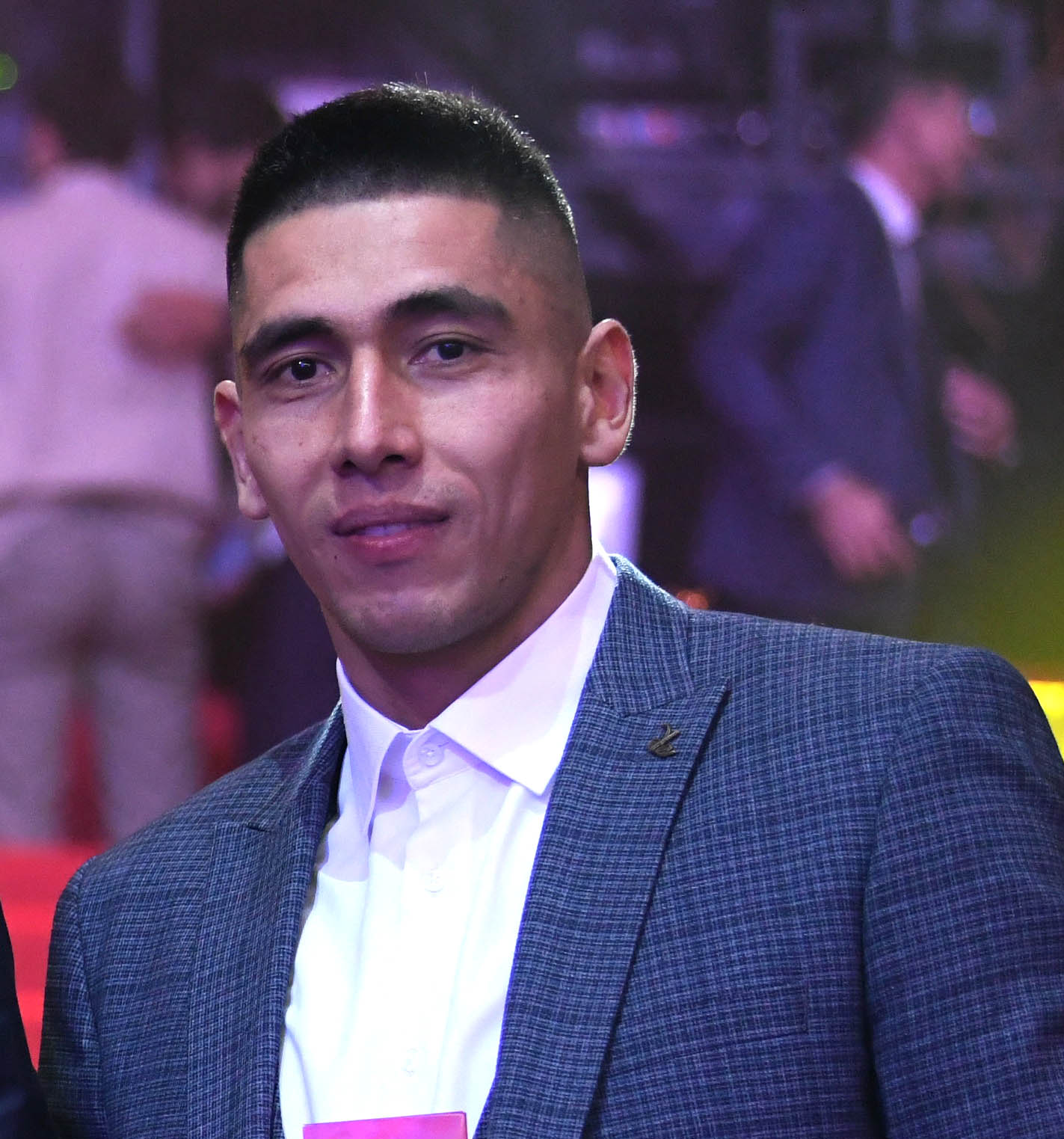

Personal information
- Full name: Utkir Yusupov
- Date of birth: 4 January 1991 (age 35)
- Place of birth: Sayram, Kazakh SSR, Soviet Union
- Height: 1.85 m (6 ft 1 in)
- Position: Goalkeeper

Team information
- Current team: Navbahor
- Number: 1

Senior career*
Years	Team	Apps	(Gls)
2012–2013	Mash'al Mubarek	4	(0)
2014–2015	Nasaf	18	(0)
2016–2018	Neftchi Fergana	38	(0)
2018–2019	Kokand 1912	32	(0)
2019–2024	Navbahor	116	(0)
2024–2026	Foolad	29	(0)
2026–	Navbahor	14	(0)

International career^{‡}
2018–	Uzbekistan	44	(0)
Medal record
Representing Uzbekistan
Winner	2026 Uzbekistan
CAFA Nations Cup
Runner-up	2023 Kyrgyzstan–Uzbekistan	Team
Winner	2025 Tajikistan–Uzbekistan	Team
- * Club domestic league appearances and goals as of 29 July 2026 ‡ National team caps and goals as of 19 June 2026

Utkir Davlatbekovich Yusupov (Uzbek: Oʻtkir Davlatbekovich Yusupov, Russian: Уткир Давлатбекович Юсупов; born 4 January 1991) is an Uzbek professional footballer who plays as a goalkeeper for Uzbekistan Super League club Navbahor. Born in Kazakhstan, he plays for the Uzbekistan national team.

== Club career ==
He started his professional career with Mash'al Mubarek in 2012. In 2014, he joined Nasaf, where he played until 2015. He then spent two seasons with Neftchi Fergana before moving to Kokand 1912 for the 2018 campaign. In 2019, he signed for Navbahor, where he has played ever since.

== International career ==
Born in Kazakhstan, Yusupov moved to Uzbekistan aged 5, and gained Uzbekistani citizenship in 2017. He was included in Uzbekistan's squad for the 2019 AFC Asian Cup in the United Arab Emirates. He participated in the 2023 AFC Asian Cup in Qatar as well.

On 2 June 2026, he was included in the 26-man squad selected by head coach Fabio Cannavaro for the 2026 FIFA World Cup, marking the country's first-ever appearance in the tournament.

== Career statistics ==
=== International ===
As of match played 17 June 2026

Appearances and goals by national team and year
National team	Year	Apps	Goals
Uzbekistan	2018	1	0
Uzbekistan	2019	0	0
Uzbekistan	2020	0	0
Uzbekistan	2021	1	0
Uzbekistan	2022	9	0
Uzbekistan	2023	9	0
Uzbekistan	2024	15	0
Uzbekistan	2025	6	0
Uzbekistan	2026	3	0
Total		44	0

== Honours ==
Uzbekistan

- CAFA Nations Cup: 2025

Individual

- Uzbekistan Super League Team of the Season: 2021, 2022
