= National service =

System of military or government service

National service is a system of compulsory or voluntary government service, usually military service. Conscription is mandatory national service. The term national service comes from the United Kingdom's National Service (Armed Forces) Act 1939.

The length and nature of national service depends on the country in question. In some instances, national service is compulsory, and citizens living abroad can be called back to their country of origin to complete it. In other cases, national service is voluntary.

Many young people spend one or more years in such programmes. Compulsory military service typically requires all citizens to enroll for one or two years, usually at age 18 (later for university-level students). Most conscripting countries conscript only men, but Norway, Sweden, Israel, Eritrea, Malaysia, Morocco, Algeria and North Korea conscript both men and women.

Voluntary national service may require only three months of basic military training. The US equivalent is Selective Service. In the United States, voluntary enrollments at the Peace Corps and AmeriCorps are also known as national service.

== Historical arguments ==
Around 100 AD, Plutarch quoted an early case for national service made by a Roman general sometime around the 5th century BC:

With the politic design of preventing intestine broils by employment abroad, and in the hope that when rich as well as poor, plebeians and patricians, should be mingled again in the same army and in the same camp, and engage in one common service for the public, it would mutually dispose them to reconciliation and friendship.

== By country ==
- Australia
- Brunei
- Canada
- Denmark
- Estonia
- Finland
- France
- Germany
- Ghana
- Greece
- Israel
- Malaysia
- New Zealand
- Nigeria
- Norway
- Philippines
- Rhodesia
- Russia
- Singapore
- South Korea
- Sweden
- Switzerland
- Taiwan
- Tunisia
- Turkey
- United Arab Emirates
- United Kingdom
- United States

== See also ==
- Alternative service
- Civil conscription
- Community service
- Military service
- National Youth Service
- Conscription § By country
