= 1999 Belgian Super Cup =

1999 Belgian Supercup
Genk	Lierse
1	3
- Date: 1 September 1999
- Venue: Fenixstadium, Genk
- Referee: Michel Piraux
- Attendance: 16,000

The 1999 Belgian Supercup was a football match between the winners of the previous season's 1998–99 Belgian First Division and 1998–99 Belgian Cup competitions. The match was contested by Cup winners Lierse and league champions Genk on 1 September 1999 at the ground of the league winners Genk, the Fenixstadium. Lierse won the cup after two late goals by Stein Huysegems.

Prior to the match, Genk coach Jos Heyligen criticised the timing of the match during the week of international matches, as five players in his squad were unavailable due to being called-up for their respective national team, namely Branko Strupar, Marc Hendrikx, Ferenc Horváth, Þórður Guðjónsson and Bjarni Guðjónsson. With several others injured, the Genk squad for the Super Cup included only 13 first team players together with four youngsters from the U23 squad. From Lierse side, absentees due to call-ups were Jurgen Cavens and Carl Hoefkens.

== Details ==
1 September 1999

Genk	1–3	Lierse
Pereira 17'		Peelman 34'; Huysegems 83', 88'

Fenixstadium, Genk
Attendance: 16,000
Referee: Michel Piraux

Genk	Lierse

GK	(Hungary) István Brockhauser
RB	(Belgium) Daniel Kimoni
CB	(Belgium) Chris Van Geem
CB	(Belgium) Marc Vangronsveld (c)
LB	(Sweden) Jesper Jansson
RM	(Belgium) Stefan Teelen		(substituted off) 87'
CM	(Belgium) Wilfried Delbroek
CM	(Albania) Besnik Hasi	Booked
LM	(Albania) Ilir Caushllari	Booked
CF	(Kenya) Mike Origi
CF	(Brazil) Fábio Pereira		(substituted off) 66'
Substitutes:
CF	(Belgium) Alexandre Di Gregorio		(substituted on) 66'
CM	(Belgium) Marco Ingrao		(substituted on) 87'
Manager:
(Belgium) Jos Heyligen

GK	(Belgium) Patrick Nys
RB	(Belgium) Steve Laeremans
CB	(Belgium) Eric Van Meir (c)
CB	(Belgium) Filip Daems
LB	(Georgia (country)) Gela Shekiladze
RM	(Belgium) Frank Leen
CM	(Belgium) Hans Somers		(substituted off) 46'
CM	(Poland) Tomasz Zdebel	Booked
LM	(Netherlands) Coen Burg		(substituted off) 66'
CF	(Belgium) Dirk Huysmans		(substituted off) 58'
CF	(Belgium) Gert Peelman		(substituted off) 76'
Substitutes:
CB	(Belgium) Jerry Poorters		(substituted on) 46'
CF	(Belgium) Robby Van de Weyer		(substituted on) 58'
CM	(Belgium) Karel Snoeckx		(substituted on) 66'
CF	(Belgium) Stein Huysegems		(substituted on) 76'
Manager:
(Belgium) Walter Meeuws

== See also ==
- 1999–2000 Belgian First Division
- 1999–2000 Belgian Cup
