= Nys =

Nys is a surname. Notable people with the surname include:

- Hugo Nys (born 1991), French tennis player
- Jef Nys (1927–2009), Belgian comic book artist
- Patrick Nys (born 1969), Belgian soccer goalkeeper
- Pieter Nys (born 1989), Belgian soccer player
- Sven Nys (born 1976), Belgian cyclist
- Thibau Nys (born 2002), Belgian cyclist, son of Sven

== Other uses ==
- The ISO 639-3 code for the Nyungar language, an Aboriginal language spoken in Western Australia

== See also ==
- NYS (disambiguation)
