= Payam Niazmand =

Iranian footballer

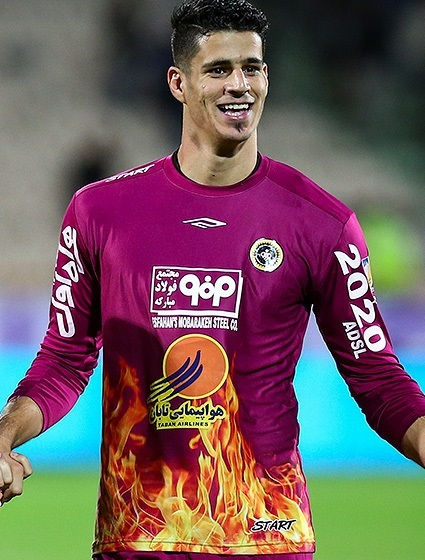
- Niazmand with Sepahan in 2018

Personal information
- Full name: Payam Niazmand Ghader
- Date of birth: 6 April 1995 (age 31)
- Place of birth: Tehran, Iran
- Height: 1.92 m (6 ft 4 in)
- Position: Goalkeeper

Team information
- Current team: Persepolis
- Number: 1

Youth career
- 2012–2016: Paykan

Senior career*
Years	Team	Apps	(Gls)
2015–2018	Paykan	30	(0)
2018–2021	Sepahan	89	(0)
2021–2023	Portimonense	2	(0)
2022–2023	→ Sepahan (loan)	27	(0)
2023–2025	Sepahan	49	(0)
2025–	Persepolis	34	(0)

International career^{‡}
2019–	Iran	17	(0)
Medal record
Representing Iran
CAFA Nations Cup
Winner	2023 Kyrgyzstan – Uzbekistan	Team
Runner-up	2025 Tajikistan–Uzbekistan	Team
- * Club domestic league appearances and goals as of 20 November 2026 ‡ National team caps and goals as of 17 November 2026

Payam Niazmand (Persian: پیام نیازمند; born 6 April 1995) is an Iranian professional footballer who plays as a goalkeeper for Iranian club Persepolis and the Iran national team.

Niazmand set the new all-time record at 940 consecutive minutes without conceding a goal. Mohammad Nouri ended his goalless streak by beating him in the 50th minute of the same match. He was included in Iran's preliminary squad for the 2019 AFC Asian Cup.

== Club career ==
=== Paykan ===
Niazmand started his senior career in Iran at Paykan in 2015, where he made 24 appearances in three seasons.

=== Sepahan ===
In 2018, Niazmand joined Sepahan. Niazmand was included in Sepahan's lineup in 89 games continuously.

=== Portimonense ===
On 13 July 2021, Niazmand joined Primeira Liga side Portimonense.

=== Persepolis ===
On 19 May 2025, Niazmand joined Persian Gulf Pro League side Persepolis on a new two-year deal.

== International career ==
On 8 October 2020, Niazmand made his debut for the Iran national team in a 2–1 friendly win against Uzbekistan. He was named in the 26-man squad for the 2026 FIFA World Cup.

== Career statistics ==
=== Club ===
As of match played 20 November 2026

Appearances and goals by club, season and competition
Club	Season	League			National cup (Note: Includes Hazfi Cup)		Continental		Other		Total	
Club	Season	Division	Apps	Goals	Apps	Goals	Apps	Goals	Apps	Goals	Apps	Goals
Paykan	2015–16	Azadegan League	6	0	0	0	—		—		6	0
Paykan	2016–17	Pro League	1	0	0	0	—		—		1	0
Paykan	2017–18	Pro League	23	0	0	0	—		—		23	0
Paykan	Total		30	0	0	0	—		—		30	0
Sepahan	2018–19	Pro League	30	0	4	0	—		—		34	0
Sepahan	2019–20	Pro League	29	0	3	0	6	0	—		38	0
Sepahan	2020–21	Pro League	30	0	3	0	0	0	—		33	0
Sepahan	2022–23 (loan)	Pro League	27	0	1	0	—		—		28	0
Sepahan	2023–24	Pro League	23	0	1	0	7	0	—		31	0
Sepahan	2024–25	Pro League	26	0	3	0	7	0	1	0	37	0
Sepahan	Total		165	0	15	0	20	0	1	0	201	0
Portimonense	2021–22	Primeira Liga	2	0	3	0	—		—		5	0
Persepolis	2025–26	Pro League	21	0	1	0	—		—		22	0
Persepolis	2026–27	Pro League	13	0	0	0	—		—		13	0
Persepolis	Total		34	0	1	0	0	0	0	0	35	0
Career total			231	0	19	0	20	0	1	0	271	0

=== International ===
As of match played 17 November 2026

Appearances and goals by national team and year
National team	Year	Apps	Goals
Iran	2020	1	0
Iran	2023	5	0
Iran	2024	3	0
Iran	2025	5	0
Iran	2026	3	0
Total		17	0

== Honours ==
Sepahan

- Iranian Hazfi Cup: 2023–24
- Iranian Super Cup: 2024

Iran

- CAFA Nations Cup: 2023

Individual

- CAFA Nations Cup Best Goalkepper: 2025
