= NYS =

NYS may refer to:

- New York Skyports Seaplane Base (IATA: NYS)
- National Youth Service, of several countries
- New York State
- New York Shipbuilding, a corporation
- Nyungar language (ISO 639-3: nys), an Australian Aboriginal language or dialect continuum

== See also ==
- Nys
