= Dirk Huysmans =

Belgian footballer

Personal information
- Date of birth: 3 September 1973 (age 53)
- Height: 1.78 m (5 ft 10 in)
- Position: Midfielder

Senior career*
Years	Team	Apps	(Gls)
1989–1997	Lierse	128	(28)
1997–1998	Standard Liège	22	(5)
1998–2000	Lierse	44	(14)
2000–2004	Germinal Beerschot	61	(19)
2004–2005	K.V. Mechelen		
2005–2006	K. Lyra TSV		
2006–2007	K. Berchem Sport		

International career
1990	Belgium U16	5	(0)
1989–1990	Belgium U17	11	(3)
1990–1991	Belgium U18	6	(2)
1991–1992	Belgium U19	4	(0)
1994–1995	Belgium U21	7	(2)
1995	Belgium	1	(0)
- * Club domestic league appearances and goals

Dirk Huysmans (born 3 September 1973) is a Belgian former professional footballer who played as a midfielder. He made one appearance for the Belgium national team in 1995.

== Honours ==
Lierse

- Belgian First Division: 1996–97
- Belgian Super Cup: 1999
