= Tunisia National service =

Compulsory military service

In Tunisia, compulsory military service applies to citizens once they reach 20 and remains applicable through age 34, ceasing when they turn 35. The duration of the military service is 1 year.

== Benefits of conscription ==
Young people who perform national service under conscription to military service the following benefits:

- The priority for recruitment into the military academies.
- The extension of the maximum age for admission to military training schools (24 years instead of 23 years).
- The possibility of continuing vocational training in many disciplines during the performance of national service.
- A monthly allowance of 200 dinars for holders of a higher school diploma or have completed at least two years of graduate successfully and holders of a higher technician certificate of vocational training and 100 dinars for other recruits.

== Concept of national service ==
The national service lasts one year and those who are engaged in higher education or vocational training programs prior to their military drafting are allowed to delay service until they have completed the programs.

There are two forms of national service; effective service in the armies' forces, or a national service outside of the armies' forces - such as units inside ministries and public establishments or within the framework of the individual assignment, as well as the technical co-operation according to the global defense necessities and the national solidarity.

The provisions of law stipulate:

- Military service is a duty for every 20-year-old Tunisian citizen suited to pass 12 months into armies’ forces units.
- From the age of 18 years, a Tunisian citizen can be incorporated after the approval of the national defense minister.
- The recruits follow a professional training in various specialties at professional training centers.

== Stages of conscription ==
1. The census

- From the age of 18, every Tunisian citizen is requested to the military census within a committee presided by the delegate of the city of his residence.
- The young's people called up to fill up information's bills by addressing themselves to their respective City Hall of residence.

2. The conscription

Every 20-year-old citizen must attend the regional office of the National Service of his residence in the previously mentioned class time indicated in his individual census bill. Through his identity card (ID), he would regularize his position vis à vis the National Service law.

The citizens who turn up to the Regional Centers of Conscription and Mobilization would undergo:

- A medical check-up to determine their aptitude to the accomplishment of the National Service.
- A psycho-technical test.

3. The military training

New recruits are conducted to the military training centers to follow basic military training. After that, they are transferred to military units and follow a professional training in various specialties at Professional Training Centers run by the three Armies and the central corps.

== See also ==
- Tunisian Armed Forces
