= Yama Sherzad =

Afghan footballer (born 2001)

Personal information
- Full name: Yama Sherzad
- Date of birth: 1 January 2001 (age 25)
- Place of birth: Kunduz, Afghanistan
- Height: 1.75 m (5 ft 9 in)
- Position: Attacking midfielder

Team information
- Current team: Breitenrain

Youth career
- 2009–2010: Steffisburg
- 2010–2011: Interlaken
- 2011–2018: Thun

Senior career*
Years	Team	Apps	(Gls)
2018–2022	Thun II	64	(4)
2022–2023	Xamax II	27	(8)
2023–2024	Biel-Bienne	2	(0)
2024–	Breitenrain	2	(0)

International career^{‡}
2023–	Afghanistan	3	(0)
- * Club domestic league appearances and goals as of 1 October 2023 ‡ National team caps and goals as of 12 October 2023

Yama Sherzad (Dari: یما شیرزاد, born 1 January 2001) is an Afghan professional footballer who plays as an attacking midfielder for Swiss Promotion League club Breitenrain.

== Early career ==
A native of Afghanistan. In 2006, he fled to Switzerland with his family. In 2009, he began playing football at the academies of clubs from the canton of Bern, before moving to the Thun academy in 2011.

== Club career ==
In the 2017/18 season, he was included for the first time in Thun's second team, playing in the Swiss Promotion League. He made his debut on 3 March 2018 in a home game against Düdingen. On 19 September 2019, he scored his first goal for the team in an away game against Portalban-Gletterens.

In June 2022, he joined the reserves side of Xamax.

On 10 July 2023, Sherzad was transferred to the Biel-Bienne club as a free agent.

In January 2024, Sherzad terminated his contract with Biel-Bienne to join Swiss Promotion League fellow Breitenrain.

== International career ==
In June 2023, Sherzad received his first call up to the Afghanistan national team, selected in the 23-men squad for the 2023 CAFA Nations Cup. He made his debut on 10 June against Kyrgyzstan.
