= Muhsen Al-Ghassani =

Omani footballer (born 1997)

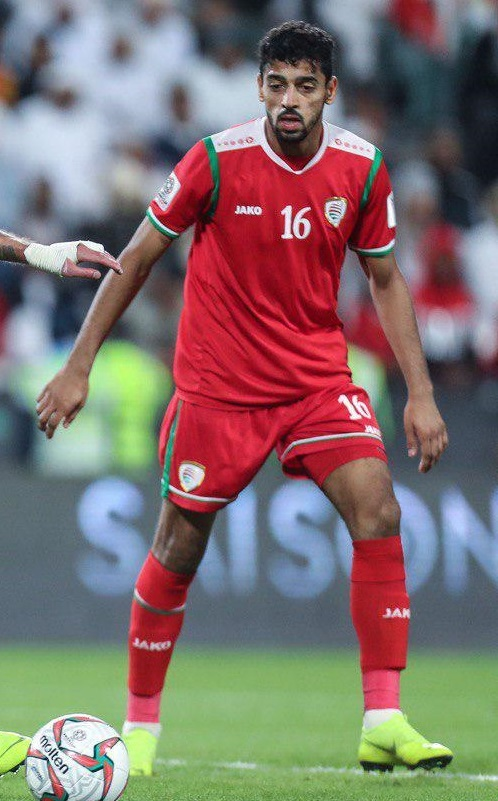
- Al-Ghassani with Oman at the 2019 AFC Asian Cup

Personal information
- Full name: Muhsen Saleh Abdullah Ali Al-Ghassani
- Date of birth: 27 March 1997 (age 29)
- Place of birth: Rustaq, Oman
- Height: 1.84 m (6 ft 0 in)
- Position: Forward

Team information
- Current team: Bangkok United
- Number: 16

Senior career*
Years	Team	Apps	(Gls)
2015–2020	Al-Suwaiq	76	(23)
2020–2021	Sepahan	6	(0)
2021–2024	Al-Seeb	52	(26)
2024–	Bangkok United	43	(19)

International career^{‡}
2015	Oman U19	3	(1)
2017–2019	Oman U23	7	(5)
2017–	Oman	67	(13)
- * Club domestic league appearances and goals as of 9 January 2026 ‡ National team caps and goals as of 5 June 2026

Muhsen Saleh Abdullah Ali Al-Ghassani (Arabic: مُحسِن صَالِح عَبد اللَّه عَلِيّ الْغَسَّانِيّ; born 27 March 1997) is an Omani professional footballer who plays as a forward for Thai League 1 club Bangkok United and the Oman national team.

== Club career ==
=== Al Suwaiq ===
Al-Ghassani started his professional career with Al-Suwaiq in July 2015.

Al-Ghassani make his AFC Cup debut on 20 February 2017 against Iraqi club Al Zawraa in a goalless draw. He scored his first goal in the competition during the 2019 edition in a 2–1 lost to Bahraini club Malkiya Club on 26 February 2019.

=== Sepahan ===
On 23 January 2020, Al-Ghassani moved to Persian Gulf Pro League club Sepahan. He make his debut on 6 February in a goalless draw against Naft Masjed Soleyman. On 18 February, Al-Ghassani make his AFC Champions League debut coming on as a substitute in a 3–0 loss to Qatari club Al Sadd.

=== Al Seeb ===
On 1 March 2021, Al-Ghassani moved to Oman Professional League club Al Seeb where he was instrumental in his first season at the club where he achieved a treble, winning the 2021–22, league title, the Sultan Qaboos Cup and the AFC Cup which he notably scored in the final against Malaysian club Kuala Lumpur City. After 52 appearances and scoring 26 goals for the club, He left the club in June 2024 after his contract has expired.

=== Bangkok United ===
On 10 July 2024, Al-Ghassani moved to Thai League 1 club Bangkok United. He make his debut on 9 August in a 2–1 win over PT Prachuap. He then scored his first goal for the club in the next match in a 4–2 lost to Buriram United on 18 August. Al-Ghassani scored his first goal where he scored a brace in the inaugural AFC Champions League Two match against Singaporean club Tampines Rovers in a 4–2 win. In his first season at the club, he scored 22 goals in 41 matches in all competition.

== International career ==
=== Youth ===
Al-Ghassani score on his debut for Oman U23 squad in a 2–0 away win over Iran U23 on 23 July 2017 during the 2018 AFC U-23 Championship qualification at the Dolen Omurzakov Stadium. On 9 January 2018, He then make his debut in opening match of the AFC U-23 Asian Cup in Changzhou against China U23 in a 3–0 lost.

=== Senior ===
Al-Ghassani make his debut for Oman in an international friendly against Afghanistan on 30 August 2017 in 2–0 win.

In January 2019, Al-Ghassani was included in Oman's squad for the 2019 AFC Asian Cup in the United Arab Emirates where he scored on the opening game in a 2–1 lost to Uzbekistan on 9 January.

In June 2023, Al-Ghassani was included in the inaugural 2023 CAFA Nations Cup Oman's squad.

In January 2024, Al-Ghassani was included in Oman's squad for the 2023 AFC Asian Cup held in Qatar. He scored his first goal in the tournament in the last group stage match in a 1–1 draw to Kyrgyzstan on 25 January.

== Career statistics ==
=== Club ===
Club performance			League		Nation Cup		League Cup		Continental		Total	
Club	Season	League	Apps	Goals	Apps	Goals	Apps	Goals	Apps	Goals	Apps	Goals
Sepahan	2019–20	Persian Gulf Pro League	5	0	0	0	0	0	5	0	10	0
Sepahan	2020–21	Persian Gulf Pro League	1	0	0	0	0	0	0	0	1	0
Sepahan	Total		6	0	0	0	0	0	5	0	11	0
Al-Seeb	2021–22	Oman Professional League	20	11	7	4	0	0	6	3	33	18
Al-Seeb	2022–23	Oman Professional League	23	11	5	4	0	0	0	0	28	15
Al-Seeb	2023–24	Oman Professional League	9	4	1	0	0	0	0	0	10	4
Al-Seeb	Total		52	26	13	8	0	0	6	3	71	35
Bangkok United	2024–25	Thai League 1	27	1	2	2	3	0	8 (Note: Includes 1 match in AFC Champions League Elite playoff and 7 matches in AFC Champions League Two)	5 (Note: 5 goal in AFC Champions League Two)	41	22
Bangkok United	Total		27	15	2	2	3	0	8	5	41	22
Total career			85	41	15	10	0	0	19	8	119	59

=== International ===
As of 5 June 2026

Oman
Year	Apps	Goals
2017	2	0
2018	7	0
2019	13	5
2021	8	2
2022	7	0
2023	8	1
2024	13	4
2025	8	1
2026	1	0
Total	67	13

Scores and results list Oman's goal tally first.

No.	Date	Venue	Opponent	Score	Result	Competition
1.	2 January 2019	Sheikh Zayed Cricket Stadium, Abu Dhabi, United Arab Emirates	Thailand	2–0	2–0	Friendly
2.	9 January 2019	Sharjah Stadium, Sharjah, United Arab Emirates	Uzbekistan	1–1	1–2	2019 AFC Asian Cup
3.	17 January 2019	Mohammed bin Zayed Stadium, Abu Dhabi, United Arab Emirates	Turkmenistan	2–1	3–1	2019 AFC Asian Cup
4.	10 September 2019	Sultan Qaboos Sports Complex, Muscat, Oman	Lebanon	1–0	1–0	Friendly
5.	10 October 2019	Al-Seeb Stadium, Seeb, Oman	Afghanistan	3–0	3–0	2022 FIFA World Cup qualification
6.	18 November 2019	Sultan Qaboos Sports Complex, Muscat, Oman	India	1–0	1–0	2022 FIFA World Cup qualification
.	29 May 2021	The Sevens Stadium, Dubai, United Arab Emirates	Indonesia	1–0	3–1	Friendly
7.	20 June 2021	Jassim bin Hamad Stadium, Doha, Qatar	Somalia	1–0	2–1	2021 FIFA Arab Cup
8.	6 September 2023	Sultan Qaboos Sports Complex, Muscat, Oman	Palestine	2–1	2–1	Friendly
.	29 December 2023	Baniyas Stadium, Abu Dhabi, United Arab Emirates	China	2–0	2–0	Friendly
9.	25 January 2024	Abdullah bin Khalifa Stadium, Doha, Qatar	Kyrgyzstan	1–0	1–1	2023 AFC Asian Cup
10.	21 March 2024	Sultan Qaboos Sports Complex, Muscat, Oman	Malaysia	2–0	2–0	2026 FIFA World Cup qualification
11.	10 October 2024	Sultan Qaboos Sports Complex, Muscat, Oman	Kuwait	2–0	4–0	2026 FIFA World Cup qualification
12.	14 November 2024	Sultan Qaboos Sports Complex, Muscat, Oman	Palestine	1–0	1–0	2026 FIFA World Cup qualification
13.	5 September 2025	JAR Stadium, Tashkent, Uzbekistan	Turkmenistan	2–1	2–1	2025 CAFA Nations Cup
