= Faisal Al-Ghamdi =

Saudi Arabian footballer (born 2001)

Personal information
- Full name: Faisal Abdulrahman Al-Ghamdi
- Date of birth: August 13, 2001 (age 25)
- Place of birth: Dammam, Saudi Arabia
- Height: 1.88 m (6 ft 2 in)
- Position: Midfielder

Team information
- Current team: Neom (on loan from Al-Ittihad)
- Number: 8

Youth career
- Al-Ettifaq

Senior career*
Years	Team	Apps	(Gls)
2022–2023	Al-Ettifaq	30	(0)
2023–	Al-Ittihad	32	(2)
2024–2025	→ Beerschot (loan)	26	(1)
2026–	→ Neom (loan)	6	(0)

International career^{‡}
2019–2020	Saudi Arabia U20		
2022–	Saudi Arabia U23		
2023–	Saudi Arabia	17	(1)
Medal record
Men's football
Representing Saudi Arabia
Islamic Solidarity Games
Silver medal – second place	2021 Konya
- * Club domestic league appearances and goals as of 5 November 2026 ‡ National team caps and goals as of 29 June 2025

Faisal Abdulrahman Al-Ghamdi (Arabic: فَيْصَل عَبْد الرَّحْمٰن الْغَامِدِيّ; born 13 August 2001) is a Saudi Arabian professional footballer who plays as a midfielder for Saudi Pro League side Neom, on loan from Al-Ittihad and the Saudi Arabia national team.

== Club career ==
Al-Ghamdi began his career at the youth team of Al-Ettifaq. He signed his first professional contract with the club on 12 December 2019. He made his first team debut for Al-Ettifaq on 5 May 2022 by coming off the bench in a 4–0 away win against Al-Taawoun. He made his first start for the club on 11 May 2022 in the 2–0 defeat to Al-Hilal.

On 7 September 2023, Al-Ghamdi joined Al-Ittihad on a five-year deal. On 1 September 2024, Al-Ghamdi joined Belgian club Beerschot on a one-year loan, making his debut in a 4–0 derby loss at Royal Antwerp at the end of the month. On 10 May 2025, he scored his first goal for Beerschot from a penalty in a 4–2 win over Cercle Brugge during the relegation play-offs.

== International career ==
=== Saudi Arabia U20 ===
Al-Ghamdi was part of the squad that qualified for the 2020 AFC U-19 Championship. He made 2 appearances during the qualifiers. Al-Ghamdi was also part of the squad that participated in the 2020 Arab Cup U-20.

=== Saudi Arabia U23 ===
Al-Ghamdi earned his first call-up for the Saudi Arabia U23 national team during the 2021 Islamic Solidarity Games. He made 4 appearances throughout the competition as the Green Falcons finished in second place, earning a silver medal. Al-Ghamdi was also included in the squad that won the 2022 WAFF U-23 Championship.

In June 2023, he took part in the Maurice Revello Tournament in France with Saudi Arabia.

=== Saudi Arabia first team ===
Al-Ghamdi made his debut for the senior Saudi Arabia national football team in 2023, transitioning from youth to full international level. He has since become a regular squad member, earning 17 caps and scoring his first international goal on 21 January 2024 during the 2023 AFC Asian Cup.

=== International goals ===
As of 21 January 2024.

Scores and results list Saudi Arabia's goal tally first.

#	Date	Venue	Opponent	Score	Result	Competition
1.	21 January 2024	Ahmad bin Ali Stadium, Al Rayyan, Qatar	Kyrgyzstan	2–0	2–0	2023 AFC Asian Cup

== Honours ==
Saudi Arabia U23

- WAFF U-23 Championship: 2022

Individual

- Saudi Pro League Rising Star of the Month: November 2023
