= Fábio Pereira (footballer, born 1991) =

Brazilian footballer (born 1991)

Fabio Pereira
Personal information
- Full name: Fabio Veras Villas Boas Pereira
- Date of birth: 19 October 1991 (age 35)
- Place of birth: São Paulo, Brazil
- Height: 1.83 m (6 ft 0 in)
- Position: Midfielder

Youth career
- 2008–2009: FSA FC
- 2009–2010: South Kent Cardinals

College career
Years	Team	Apps	(Gls)
2011–2013	Michigan Wolverines	79	(13)

Senior career*
Years	Team	Apps	(Gls)
2012–2013	Detroit City FC	?	(?)
2014	Seattle Sounders FC	0	(0)
2015	Uberlândia	?	(?)
- * Club domestic league appearances and goals

Fabio Veras Villas Boas Pereira (born 19 October 1991) is a retired Brazilian footballer who last played for the Seattle Sounders FC of Major League Soccer.

== Career ==
=== Youth and college ===
Pereira was a four-year starter in for the University of Michigan where he scored 12 times in 78 appearances for the Wolverines.

=== Professional ===
Pereira was the very final pick of the 2014 MLS SuperDraft, being drafted in the fourth round and 77th overall by the Seattle Sounders FC. Pereira signed on a contract with Seattle in February 2014. On 18 June 2014, Pereira made his only appearance with the Sounders, coming on for the final 23 minutes in a 5-0 win over PSA Elite in the fourth round proper of the U.S. Open Cup.

He was waived at the end of the 2014 season. He subsequently signed with Uberlândia of the Série D in his native Brazil.
