= CAFA Nations Cup =

Men's association football competition

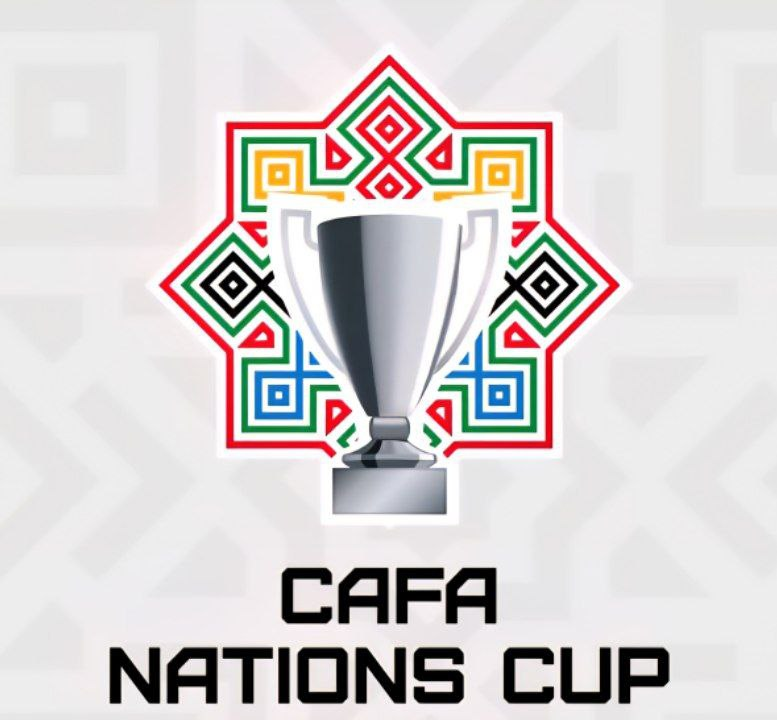
- Organiser(s): CAFA
- Founded: 2023
- Region: Central Asia
- Teams: 8 (2025)
- Current champions: Uzbekistan (1st title)
- Most championships: Iran (1 title) Uzbekistan (1 title)
- Website: the-cafa.com
- 2025 CAFA Nations Cup

The CAFA Nations Cup is an international football competition contested by the senior men's national teams of the Central Asian Football Association (CAFA), the governing body of football in Central Asia. Established in 2023, the tournament features Afghanistan, Iran, Kyrgyzstan, Tajikistan, Turkmenistan, and Uzbekistan, with occasional invited guest nations. It is held biennially and serves as the flagship competition of CAFA, aiming to promote football development and regional unity. The inaugural edition took place in Tashkent and Bishkek, with Iran claiming the first title.

== History ==
=== Inaugural tournament ===
The inaugural edition of the senior men's tournament was initially planned to be hosted by Tashkent in October 2018. It was not played out. In March 2023, it was announced the inaugural edition of the senior men's tournament would commence in June in Tashkent and Bishkek for the six member associations, along with the addition of two guest: Russia and an unconfirmed Asian team. However, the start of the inaugural edition of the tournament was put in doubt again after it was reported in early April 2023 that Iran, Uzbekistan, Russia, and Iraq would instead take part in a four-nation tournament in June 2023. On 15 April, it was reported that Russia was set to shun the inaugural CAFA Championship. On 19 April, it was reported that Russia had withdrawn from the tournament. On 24 April, Oman was reported to be an invited guest team after Thailand reportedly turned down an invitation.

=== Later tournaments ===
In April 2025, it was announced that the second edition of the CAFA Nations Cup would be held around September, commemorating the ten-year anniversary of the CAFA organization. In June 2025, it was confirmed the second edition would be co-hosted in Uzbekistan and Tajikistan on 29 August to 8 September 2025 for the six member associations along with Malaysia and Oman as the guest teams. On 15 July 2025, Malaysia announced their withdrawal from the competition, citing problems with logistics and players' availability as the reasons. On 30 July 2025, India was announced as the guest team, replacing Malaysia.

== Results ==
Edition	Year	Hosts	Champions	Score	Runners-up	Third place	Score	Fourth place	No. of teams
1	2023	Kyrgyzstan; Uzbekistan	Iran	1–0	Uzbekistan	Oman	1–0	Kyrgyzstan	7
2	2025	Tajikistan; Uzbekistan	Uzbekistan	1–0 (a.e.t.)	Iran	India	1–1 (a.e.t.) (3–2 p)	Oman	8
3	2027	Turkmenistan; Uzbekistan	-	-	-	-	-	-	TBD

== Overall team records ==
In this ranking 3 points are awarded for a win, 1 for a draw and 0 for a loss. As per statistical convention in football, matches decided in extra time are counted as wins and losses, while matches decided by penalty shoot-outs are counted as draws. Teams are ranked by total points, then by goal difference, then by goals scored.

As of 2025 CAFA Nations Cup

Rank	Team	Part	Pld	W	D	L	GF	GA	GD	Pts
1	Uzbekistan	2	8	6	1	1	18	4	+14	19
2	Iran	2	7	5	1	1	20	6	+14	16
3	Oman	2	8	4	3	1	10	8	+2	15
4	Tajikistan	2	6	1	3	2	8	11	–3	6
5	India	1	4	1	2	1	3	5	–2	5
6	Kyrgyzstan	2	6	1	1	4	6	13	–7	4
7	Turkmenistan	2	6	0	2	4	4	10	–6	2
8	Afghanistan	2	5	0	1	4	2	14	–12	1

Teams reaching the top four
Team	Titles	Runners-up	Third place	Fourth place	Total
Iran	1 (2023)	1 (2025)			2
Uzbekistan	1 (2025)	1 (2023)			2
Oman			1 (2023)	1 (2025)	2
India			1 (2025)		1
Kyrgyzstan				1 (2023)	1

- Italic: hosts

== Comprehensive results ==
Legend

- 1st – Champions
- 2nd – Runners-up
- 3rd – Third place
- 4th – Fourth place
- GS – Group stage
- Q – Qualified for the current tournament
- •• – Qualified but withdrew
- • – Did not qualify
- × – Did not enter / Withdrew / Banned/Wasn’t invited
- – Hosts

Team	(Kyrgyzstan) (Uzbekistan) 2023 (7)	(Tajikistan) (Uzbekistan) 2025 (8)	Total
Afghanistan	GS	GS	2
Iran	1st	2nd	2
Kyrgyzstan	4th	GS	2
Tajikistan	GS	GS	2
Turkmenistan	GS	GS	2
Uzbekistan	2nd	1st	2
Invited teams
India	×	3rd	1
Oman	3rd	4th	2

== Awards ==
Year	Winning coaches	Most valuable player	Top goalscorers	Best goalkeeper	Fair play award
2023	(Iran) Amir Ghalenoei	(Iran) Mehdi Taremi	(Iran) Mehdi Taremi (6)	(Oman) Ibrahim Al-Mukhaini	Uzbekistan
2025	(Uzbekistan) Timur Kapadze	(Uzbekistan) Khojiakbar Alijonov	(Uzbekistan) Igor Sergeev (3)	(Iran) Payam Niazmand	Tajikistan

== See also ==
- Nowruz Cup
- CAFA Women's Championship
- AFF Championship
- EAFF E-1 Football Championship
- SAFF Championship
- WAFF Championship
- AFC Asian Cup
- Asian Games
