= Salaah Al-Yahyaei =

Omani footballer (born 1998)

Salaah al-Yahyaei
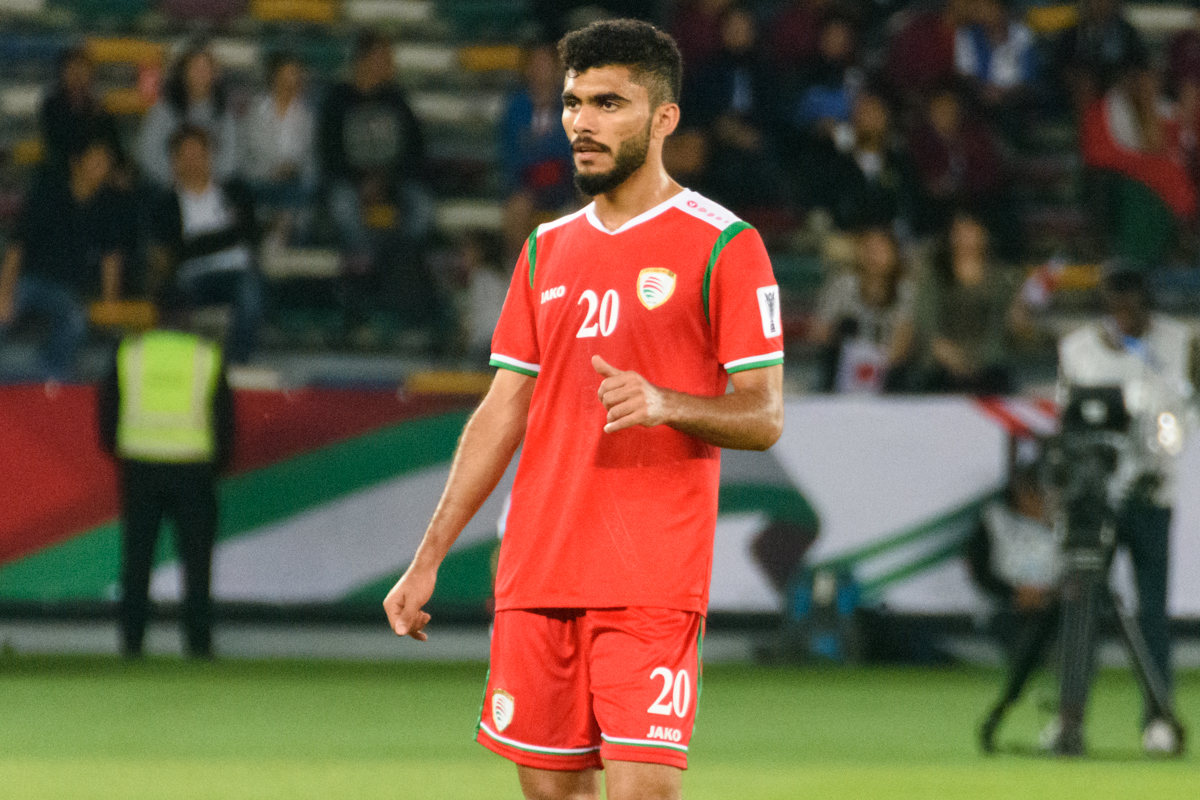
- Al-Yahyaei with Oman at the 2019 Asian Cup

Personal information
- Full name: Salah Said Salim al-Yahyaei
- Date of birth: 17 August 1998 (age 28)
- Place of birth: Seeb, Oman
- Height: 1.80 m (5 ft 11 in)
- Position: Attacking midfielder

Team information
- Current team: Al-Faisaly
- Number: 27

Senior career*
Years	Team	Apps	(Gls)
2015–2016	Seeb		
2016–2017	Fanja	+7	
2017–2018	Seeb		
2018–2020	Dhofar	+23	
2020–2023	Seeb	+26	(+6)
2022	→ Qatar SC (loan)	7	(0)
2023–2024	Al-Nahda	16	(4)
2024–2025	Al-Khaldiya		
2025–2026	Seeb	5	(3)
2026–	Al-Faisaly	0	(0)

International career^{‡}
2016–	Oman	54	(9)
Medal record
Men's football
Representing Oman
Gulf Cup
Runner-up	2024 Kuwait
- * Club domestic league appearances and goals as of 23 May 2026 ‡ National team caps and goals as of 16 January 2024

Salah Said Salim al-Yahyaei (Arabic: صَلَاح سَعِيْد سَالِم الْيَحْيَائِيّ; born 17 August 1998), commonly known as Salaah al-Yahyaei, is an Omani footballer who plays as an attacking midfielder for Jordanian Pro League club Al-Faisaly and the Oman national team.

== Career ==
=== Club ===
On 12 January 2022, Al-Yahyaei joined Qatar SC until the end of the season.

=== International ===
Al-Yahyaei made his debut for Oman national team in a friendly match on 31 August 2016 against Republic of Ireland. He was included in Oman's squad for the 2019 AFC Asian Cup in the United Arab Emirates.

== Career statistics ==
=== International ===
As of 16 January 2024

Oman
Year	Apps	Goals
2016	3	1
2017	2	1
2018	4	0
2019	7	0
2020	0	0
2021	17	3
2022	9	1
2023	10	2
2024	2	1
Total	54	9

Scores and results list Oman's goal tally first.

No	Date	Venue	Opponent	Score	Result	Competition
1.	10 October 2016	Sultan Qaboos Sports Complex, Muscat, Oman	Bahrain	1–2	2–2	Friendly
2.	5 September 2017	Sultan Qaboos Sports Complex, Muscat, Oman	Maldives	3–0	5–0	2019 AFC Asian Cup qualification
3.	20 June 2021	Jassim bin Hamad Stadium, Doha, Qatar	Somalia	2–0	2–1	2021 FIFA Arab Cup qualification
4.	12 October 2021	Sultan Qaboos Sports Complex, Muscat, Oman	Vietnam	3–1	3–1	2022 FIFA World Cup qualification
5.	30 November 2021	Al Janoub Stadium, Al Wakrah, Qatar	Iraq	1–0	1–1	2021 FIFA Arab Cup
6.	20 November 2022	Khalifa bin Zayed Stadium, Al Ain, United Arab Emirates	Belarus	1–0	2–0	Friendly
7.	19 January 2023	Basra International Stadium, Basra, Iraq	Iraq	1–1	2–3	25th Arabian Gulf Cup
8.	14 June 2023	Pakhtakor Central Stadium, Tashkent, Uzbekistan	Tajikistan	1–0	1–1	2023 CAFA Nations Cup
9.	16 January 2024	Khalifa International Stadium, Al Rayyan, Qatar	Saudi Arabia	1–0	1–2	2023 AFC Asian Cup
