= Gela Shekiladze =

Georgian footballer and coach

Gela Shekiladze (Georgia (country)) (Belgium)
Personal information
- Date of birth: 14 September 1970 (age 56)
- Place of birth: Batumi, Georgia
- Height: 1.78 m (5 ft 10 in)
- Position: Defender

Senior career*
Years	Team	Apps	(Gls)
1990–1998	Dinamo Batumi	239	(7)
1998–2002	Lierse	81	(2)
2002–2003	Roeselare	25	(0)
2003–2004	Arsenal Kyiv	13	(0)
2004	→ CSKA Kyiv	1	(0)

International career
1997–2002	Georgia	22	(0)

Managerial career
- 2007–2008: Georgia U21 (assistant)
- 2007–2008: Georgia U17
- 2008: Georgia (assistant)
- 2008–2009: Georgia U19
- 2009–2010: Georgia U15
- 2010–2011: Georgia U16
- 2013–2017: Dinamo Batumi (director of sports)
- 2015–2016: Afghanistan (assistant)
- 2019–2020: Maldives (assistant)
- 2022–2024: Tajikistan (assistant)
- 2024–2025: Tajikistan
- * Club domestic league appearances and goals

Gela Shekiladze (Georgian: გელა შეყილაძე; born 14 September 1970) is a Georgian-Belgian football coach and former football defender from Georgia. He most recently worked as head coach of the Tajikistan national football team from 20 February 2024 to 10 September 2025.

== Footballing career ==
Between 1997 and 2002, Shekiladze was capped 22 times for the national team. His club career began with Dinamo Batumi, where he was a first team regular, eventually spending eight seasons with the club. Highlights from his time in Dinamo Batumi include winning the Georgian Cup in 1998 after defeating Dinamo Tbilisi in the final. During the same year, the club also won the Georgian Super Cup; they again defeated Dinamo Tbilisi with a final score of 2–1. In the summer of 1998, Shekiladze joined Belgian club K. Lierse S.K., with whom he won the 1999 Belgian Super Cup and the 44th Belgian Cup in 1999. Later, K. Lierse S.K. also awarded him with Player of the Year in 2000. In 2003–04, he joined FC Arsenal Kyiv for one season in the Ukrainian league before retiring.

== Coaching career ==
=== Georgia National Team ===
Starting from 2007, Gela Shekiladze started coaching various age groups of the Georgian national football team. From 2007 to 2008 he was the assistant coach of the Georgian U-21 national team. Working alongside Petar Segrt, they achieved one for the great accomplishments in the football history of the Georgian national team, with a 2–0 victory against Russia U21 in the 2007 European U21 Cup qualification. From 2008 to 2011, he was respectively the head coach of the Georgian National Football Teams of U-17, U-19, U-15 and U-16. For the following 5 years, he moved on to be the sport director and youth football development manager at Dinamo Batumi. In 2015 Shekiladze acquired his UEFA Pro Licence.

=== FC Batumi Dinamo ===
In the years 2013–2017, Shekiladze worked as the sport director and youth football development manager of FC Dinamo Batumi.

=== Afghanistan National Team ===
In 2015–2016, Gela Shekiladze assisted Petar Segrt with coaching the Afghanistan National Football Team. Together, they won 6 out of 8 official matches; won four South Asia Cup matches and lost against India in overtime with a final score of 1–2. In the World Cup qualification for Russia 2018, the team lost only once against Japan, having won the two other matches. This year was considered to be the most successful for Afghanistan.

=== Maldives National Team ===
In 2019–2020, Gela Shekiladze was assistant coach of the Maldives national football team. He had already been working with the team during their remarkable SAFF Suzuki Cup 2018 victory in Bangladesh, where the Maldives defeated tournament favorite India 2–1 in the final and caused a big upraor.

=== Tajikistan National Team ===
On 21 February 2024, Tajikistan Football Federation announced Shekiladze as their new head coach. Since January 2022 Shekiladze worked as assistant coach for the team with Petar Segrt. During their leadership, Tajikistan secured a place in the 2023 AFC Asian Cup, marking their inaugural participation in a significant continental football event. This achievement came after five previous unsuccessful attempts to qualify for the Asian Cup. Additionally, under their guidance, Tajikistan emerged victorious in the 2022 King's Cup held in Thailand and the 2023 Merdeka Tournament in Malaysia, all while managing a team with an average squad age of 21.

During the 2023 Asian Cup, the Tajikistan squad secured a draw (0–0) against China PR). Following a 0–1 loss to Qatar and a 2–1 triumph over the highly favored Lebanon, the team advanced to the Round of 16. In a thrilling turn of events on January 28, 2024, Tajikistan caused an upset by defeating the UAE 5-3 in a penalty shootout to progress to the quarter-finals of the 2023 Asian Cup, concluding the match at 1-1 after extra time.

During Shekiladze's tenure, the following achievements were notable:

- Led the team to finish first in the qualification group.
- Gave debuts to 17 players in the national team.
- Made history by not losing to a team ranked in the FIFA Top 20 for the first time in Tajik football.

After the 2025 CAFA Nations Cup, the Tajikistan Football Federation decided to terminate his contract. At the time his tenure was concluded in September 2025, the national team was ranked 1st in the qualifying group for the 2027 Asian Cup.
