= Patrick Nys =

Belgian footballer

Personal information
- Date of birth: 25 January 1969 (age 57)
- Place of birth: Turnhout, Belgium
- Position: Goalkeeper

Senior career*
Years	Team	Apps	(Gls)
1997–1999	Lommel SK	62	(0)
1999–2000	Lierse S.K.	26	(0)
2000–2002	Gençlerbirligi	61	(0)
2002–2003	KFC Dessel Sport		
2003–2010	F.C. Brussels		
- * Club domestic league appearances and goals

Patrick Nys (born 25 January 1969) is a Belgian former football goalkeeper who lasted played for F.C. Brussels. As of the summer of 2010, he is a goalkeeper coach with Antwerp FC.

== Honours ==
- Lierse S.K.
  - Belgian Super Cup (1): 1999
- Gençlerbirliği
  - Turkish Cup (1): 2001
