= Amantur Shamurzayev =

Kyrgyzstani footballer

Personal information
- Full name: Amantur Nurbekovich Shamurzayev
- Date of birth: 25 January 2000 (age 26)
- Place of birth: Bishkek, Kyrgyzstan
- Height: 1.80 m (5 ft 11 in)
- Positions: Centre-back; left-back

Team information
- Current team: Uzgen
- Number: 27

Youth career
- –2019: Alga Bishkek

Senior career*
Years	Team	Apps	(Gls)
2019	Ilbirs-2 Bishkek		
2020	Dordoi-2 Bishkek		
2021	Kara-Balta	13	(2)
2021	Kaganat	13	(1)
2022	Dordoi Bishkek	0	(0)
2022	Kaganat	25	(0)
2023	Alay	25	(4)
2024	Abdysh-Ata Kant		
2025	Neman Grodno	27	(0)
2026–	Uzgen	3	(0)

International career^{‡}
2023–	Kyrgyzstan	3	(0)
- * Club domestic league appearances and goals as of 15 March 2026 ‡ National team caps and goals as of 25 January 2024

Amantur Nurbekovich Shamurzayev (Kyrgyz: Амантур Шамурзаев; Russian: Амантур Нурбекович Шамурзаев; born 25 January 2000) is a Kyrgyzstani professional footballer who plays as a centre-back or left-back for Uzgen and the Kyrgyzstan national team.

== International career ==
Shamurzayev made his debut for the senior Kyrgyzstan national team on 30 December 2023 in a friendly against the United Arab Emirates.

He was included in Kyrgyzstan's squad for the 2023 AFC Asian Cup.
