= Ibrahim Al-Mukhaini (footballer, born 1997) =

Omani footballer (born 1996)

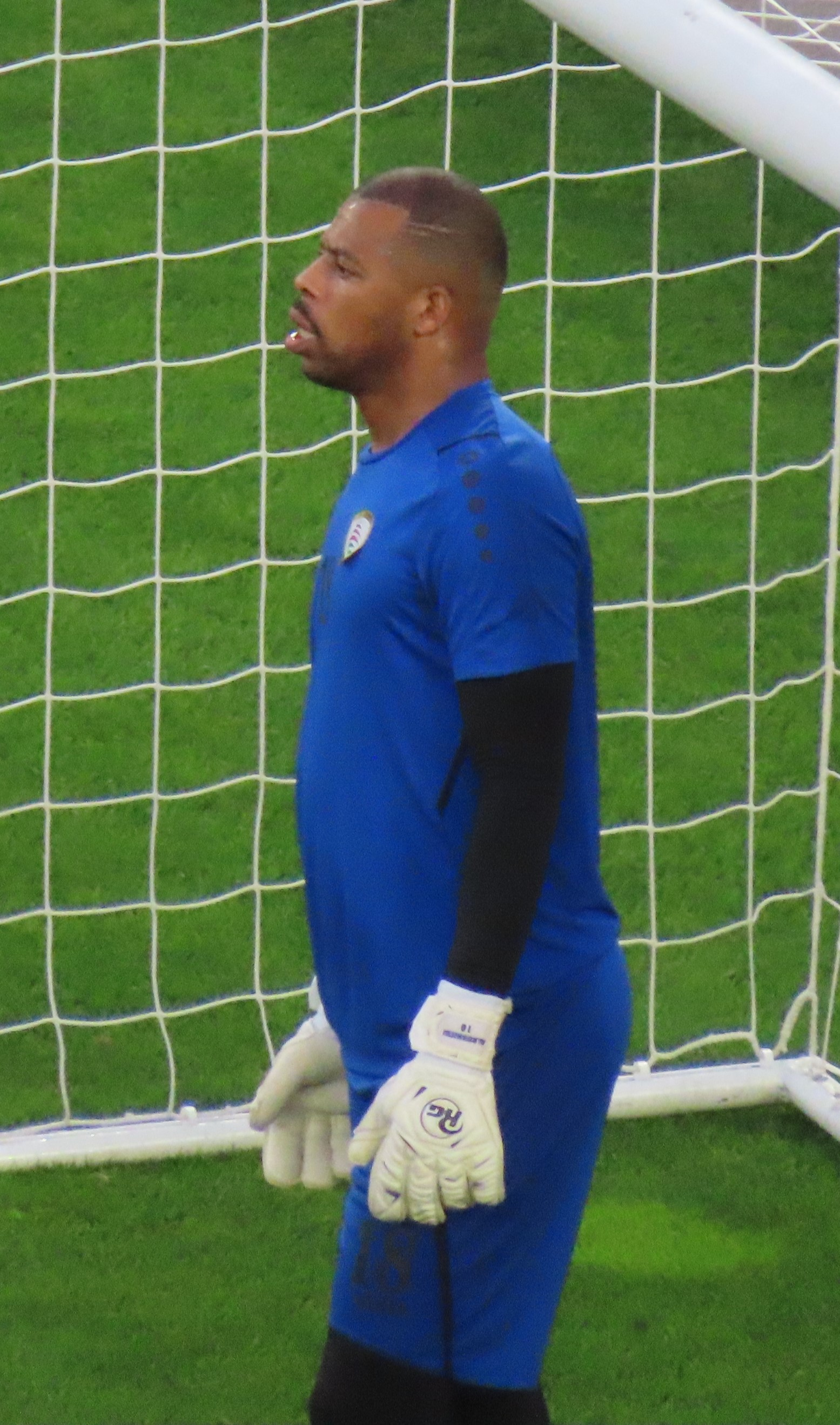
- Al-Mukhaini warming up with Oman in 2023.

Personal information
- Full name: Ibrahim Saleh Ibrahim Saleh Al-Mukhaini
- Date of birth: 20 June 1997 (age 29)
- Place of birth: Sur, Oman
- Height: 1.91 m (6 ft 3 in)
- Position: Goalkeeper

Team information
- Current team: Al-Nahda
- Number: 1

Youth career
- Al-Hara

Senior career*
| Years | Team | Apps | (Gls) |
| –2015 | Al-Hara | | |
| 2015–2019 | Al-Orouba | 14 | |
| 2019–2022 | Al Nasr SCSC | 23 | |
| 2022–2025 | Al-Nahda | 65 | (0) |
| 2025– | Al-Shabab | 0 | (0) |

International career
| 2019– | Oman | 41 | (0) |
Medal record
Men's football
Representing Oman
Gulf Cup
| Runner-up | 2023 IRAQ |
- * Club domestic league appearances and goals

Ibrahim Saleh Ibrahim Saleh Al-Mukhaini(Arabic: إِبْرَاهِيم صَالِح إِبْرَاهِيم صَالِح الْمُخَيْنِيّ; born 20 June 1997) is an Omani professional footballer who plays as a goalkeeper for Oman Professional League club Al-Shabab and the Oman national team.

== Club career ==
Al-Mukhaini began his career with Al-Hara, where he gained the nickname "Ibrahim Buffon" after Italian goalkeeper Gianluigi Buffon. He then moved to Al-Ouruba, breaking into the first team for the 2014/15 season, leading to a national team callup. He participated in the 2016 AFC Cup with Al-Ouruba, who finished last in Group B, winning one game against Al-Wahda (Syria), and tying Shabab Al-Dhahiriya (Palestine).

He then moved to Al-Nahda in 2019, renewing his contract in 2020. The team finished second in 2021/22, before winning the league in 2022/23. The team also won the Sultan Qaboos Cup in 2022/23. After a 3–2 victory over Al-Khaldiya (Bahrain) in the West Asia zone play-off qualifier, Al-Nahda secured a spot in the group stage for the 2023-24 AFC Cup.

== International career ==
Al Mukhaini was called up to the Omani national team for a friendly with Japan in November 2016 and an Asian Cup qualifying game in 2017. He participated in the 2018 AFC U23 Asian Cup. He has since participated in a number of international competitions and qualifying campaigns for Oman, including 2019 AFC Asian Cup qualification, the 24th Arabian Gulf Cup, 2022 AFC World Cup qualifiers, the 2021 Arab Cup, the 25th Arabian Gulf Cup and the 2023 CAFA Nations Cup.

He won the award for Best Goalkeeper at the 25th Arabian Gulf Cup, where Oman finished second, and at the 2023 CAFA Nations Cup, in which Oman finished third.

Al-Mukhaini was called up for international friendlies ahead of Oman's 2026 World Cup and 2027 AFC Asian Cup qualifying campaigns. He currently wears the "1" jersey for Oman.

== Honours ==
Al Nahda

- Oman Professional League: 2022–23

Individual

- Arabian Gulf Cup Best Goalkeeper: 2023
- CAFA Nations Cup Best Goalkeeper: 2023
