= Kai Merk =

German-Kyrgyz footballer (born 1998)

Personal information
- Date of birth: 26 August 1998 (age 28)
- Place of birth: Dahn, Germany
- Height: 1.78 m (5 ft 10 in)
- Position: Forward

Team information
- Current team: Alga Bishkek
- Number: 17

Youth career
- –2017: Pirmasens

Senior career*
Years	Team	Apps	(Gls)
2017–2020	SV Elversberg	29	(2)
2020–2021	VfR Aalen	36	(4)
2021–2025	Pétange	79	(27)
2025	Dudelange	6	(0)
2025	Dordoi Bishkek	14	(6)
2026–	Alga Bishkek		

International career^{‡}
2023–	Kyrgyzstan	29	(3)
- * Club domestic league appearances and goals as of 14 February 2025 ‡ National team caps and goals as of 10 June 2026 (UTC)

Kai Merk (Russian: Кай Мерк; born 28 August 1998) is a professional footballer who plays as a forward for Kyrgyz club Alga Bishkek. Born in Germany, he represents the Kyrgyzstan national team.

His brother Kimi is also a footballer.

== Club career ==
Merk started his career with German side SV Elversberg, helping them win the 2018 Saarland Cup. In 2021, he signed for Pétange in the Luxembourg National Division.

On 3 July 2025, Dordoi Bishkek announced the signing of Merk on a contract until the end of the 2025 season.

== International career ==
Born in Germany, Merk is of Kyrgyzstani descent through his father. He was called up to the Kyrgyzstan national team in March 2023.

Merk scored his first international goal on 16 November against Malaysia during the 2026 FIFA World Cup qualification at the Bukit Jalil National Stadium.

No.	Date	Venue	Opponent	Score	Result	Competition
1.	16 November 2023	Bukit Jalil National Stadium, Kuala Lumpur, Malaysia	Malaysia	3–1	3–4	2026 FIFA World Cup qualification - AFC 2nd round
2.	21 March 2024	Nanzih Football Stadium, Kaohsiung, Taiwan	Chinese Taipei	2–0	2–0	2026 FIFA World Cup qualification - AFC 2nd round
3.	10 June 2025	Dolen Omurzakov Stadium, Bishkek, Kyrgyzstan	United Arab Emirates	1–1	1–1	2026 FIFA World Cup qualification - AFC 3rd round
