= Khalid Al-Braiki =

Omani footballer (born 1993)

Personal information
- Full name: Khalid Nasser Fadhil Al-Braiki
- Date of birth: 3 July 1993 (age 33)
- Place of birth: Muscat, Oman
- Height: 1.83 m (6 ft 0 in)
- Position: Defender

Team information
- Current team: Artis Brno
- Number: 3

Senior career*
Years	Team	Apps	(Gls)
2014–2016	Al-Mussanah		
2016–2018	Al-Shabab		
2018–2019	Al-Nasr		
2019–2025	Al-Seeb		
2025–	Artis Brno	7	(0)

International career^{‡}
2018–	Oman	35	(0)
Medal record
Men's football
Representing Oman
Gulf Cup
Runner-up	2024 Kuwait
- * Club domestic league appearances and goals as of 24 May 2026 ‡ National team caps and goals as of 15 December 2025

Khalid Nasser Fadhil Al-Braiki (Arabic: خالد البريكي; born 3 July 1993), commonly known as Khalid Al-Braiki, is an Omani footballer who plays for Artis Brno in Czech National Football League and the Oman national football team as a defender.

== Club career ==
On 27 June 2025, Al-Braiki signed a one-year contract with Czech National Football League club Artis Brno with option.

== International career ==
Al-Braiki made his debut for Oman national team in a friendly match on 9 September 2018 against Lebanon. He was included in Oman's squad for the 2019 Asian Cup in the United Arab Emirates.

== Career statistics ==
=== International ===
Statistics accurate as of match played 17 January 2019

Oman national team
Year	Apps	Goals
2018	4	0
2019	3	0
Total	7	0
