= Erzhan Tokotayev =

Kyrgyzstani association football player

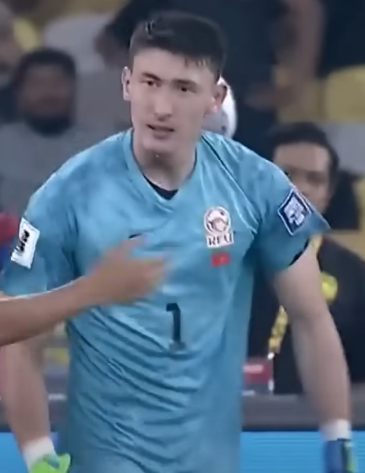
- Tokotayev in 2023

Personal information
- Full name: Erzhan Nurlanovich Tokotayev
- Date of birth: 17 July 2000 (age 26)
- Place of birth: Bishkek, Kyrgyzstan
- Height: 1.88 m (6 ft 2 in)
- Position: Goalkeeper

Team information
- Current team: Andijon
- Number: 31

Senior career*
Years	Team	Apps	(Gls)
2018–2020	Dordoi Bishkek	13	(0)
2021	Alga Bishkek	15	(0)
2022	Turan	22	(0)
2022–2023	Caspiy	2	(0)
2023–2025	Şanlıurfaspor	34	(0)
2025–	Andijon	2	(0)

International career^{‡}
2021–	Kyrgyzstan	35	(0)
- * Club domestic league appearances and goals as of 11 August 2025 ‡ National team caps and goals as of 15 June 2025

Erzhan Nurlanovich Tokotayev (Kyrgyz: Эржан Токотаев; Russian: Эржан Нурланович Токотаев; born 17 July 2000) is a Kyrgyzstani footballer who plays for Uzbek club Andijon and the Kyrgyzstan national football team as a goalkeeper.

== Career statistics ==
=== International ===
Kyrgyzstan national team
Year	Apps	Goals
2021	3	0
2022	6	0
Total	9	0

Statistics accurate as of match played 24 September 2022
