= National Youth Service =

National Youth Service may refer to:

- National Youth Service (Kenya)
- National Youth Service Corps (Nigeria)
- National Youth Service (Seychelles)
- National Youth Service (Zimbabwe)
