= Adil Kadyrzhanov =

Kyrgyzstani footballer

Personal information
- Full name: Adil Ruslanovich Kadyrzhanov
- Date of birth: 14 July 2000 (age 26)
- Place of birth: Saratov, Russia
- Height: 1.79 m (5 ft 10 in)
- Position: Defensive midfielder

Team information
- Current team: FC Dordoi Bishkek

Youth career
- Dordoi Bishkek

Senior career*
Years	Team	Apps	(Gls)
2019–2022	Alga Bishkek	45	(2)
2023–	Dordoi Bishkek	23	(0)

International career^{‡}
2023–	Kyrgyzstan	3	(0)
- * Club domestic league appearances and goals as of 30 August 2024 @ 16:36(AEST) ‡ National team caps and goals as of 25 January 2024

Adil Ruslanovich Kadyrzhanov (Kyrgyz: Адыл Кадыржанов; Russian: Адиль Русланович Кадыржанов; born 14 July 2000) is a football player who plays as a defensive midfielder for Dordoi Bishkek. Born in Russia, he represents the Kyrgyzstan national team.

== International career ==
Kadyrzhanov made his debut for the senior Kyrgyzstan national team on 25 December 2023 in a friendly against Uzbekistan.

He was included in Kyrgyzstan's squad for the 2023 AFC Asian Cup.
