= Nurdoolot Stalbekov =

Kyrgyzstani footballer

Personal information
- Full name: Nurdoolot Stalbekovich Stalbekov
- Date of birth: 13 September 2001 (age 25)
- Place of birth: Kyrgyzstan
- Height: 1.78 m (5 ft 10 in)
- Positions: Right winger; centre-forward

Team information
- Current team: Uzgen
- Number: 40

Senior career*
Years	Team	Apps	(Gls)
2019	Akademija Osh	1	(0)
2020	Ilbirs Bishkek	11	(1)
2021–2024	Alay	56	(8)
2025–2026	Isloch Minsk Raion	28	(1)
2026–	Uzgen	7	(0)

International career^{‡}
2023–	Kyrgyzstan U23	4	(0)
2023–	Kyrgyzstan	3	(0)
- * Club domestic league appearances and goals as of 30 August 2026 ‡ National team caps and goals as of 25 January 2024

Nurdoolot Stalbekovich Stalbekov (Kyrgyz: Нурдөөлөт Сталбеков; Russian: Нурдоолот Сталбекович Сталбеков; born 13 September 2001) is a Kyrgyzstani football player who plays as a right winger or centre-forward for Uzgen and the Kyrgyzstan national team.

== Club career ==
On January 23, 2025, Belarusian FC Isloch Minsk Raion announced the signing of a contract with Nurdoolot Stalbekov. The agreement is for one year.

== International career ==
Stalbekov made his debut for the senior Kyrgyzstan national team on 25 December 2023 in a friendly against Uzbekistan.

He was included in Kyrgyzstan's squad for the 2023 AFC Asian Cup.
