= 2023 CAFA Nations Cup =

International men's football competition

Tournament details
- Host countries: Kyrgyzstan; Uzbekistan
- Dates: 10 – 20 June
- Teams: 7 (from 2 sub-confederations)
- Venues: 3 (in 2 host cities)

Final positions
- Champions: Iran (1st title)
- Runners-up: Uzbekistan
- Third place: Oman
- Fourth place: Kyrgyzstan

Tournament statistics
- Matches played: 11
- Goals scored: 33 (3 per match)
- Attendance: 89,776 (8,161 per match)
- Top scorer(s): (Iran) Mehdi Taremi (6 goals)
- Best player: (Iran) Mehdi Taremi
- Best goalkeeper: (Oman) Ibrahim Al-Mukhaini
- Fair play award: Uzbekistan

The 2023 CAFA Nations Cup was the first edition of the CAFA Nations Cup, the biennial international men's football championship of Central Asia organized by the Central Asian Football Association (CAFA). The event was held in Kyrgyzstan and Uzbekistan from June 10 to 20.

== Background ==
The inaugural edition of the senior men's tournament was initially planned to be hosted by Tashkent in October 2018. It was not played out though.

In March 2023, it was announced the inaugural edition of the senior men's tournament would commence in June 2023 in Tashkent and Bishkek for the six member associations, along with the addition of two invited guest teams: Russia and an unconfirmed Asian team. However, the start of the inaugural edition of the tournament was put in doubt again after it was reported in early April 2023 that Iran, Uzbekistan, Russia, and Iraq would instead take part in a four-nation tournament in June 2023.

On 15 April, it was reported that Russia was set to shun the inaugural CAFA Championship, while organizers insisted they were still in talks with them over their participation. On 18 April, it was reported that Iran would take part in the inaugural CAFA Championship along with the member associations of Tajikistan, Uzbekistan, Kyrgyzstan, Turkmenistan, and Afghanistan, as well as invited guests Russia and one other Asian country, with the tournament being hosted in Tashkent and Bishkek in June. On 19 April, it was reported that Russia had withdrawn from the tournament. On 24 April, Oman was reported to be an invited guest team after Thailand reportedly turned down an invitation.

== Participating nations ==
Country	Appearance	FIFA ranking 6 April 2023
Afghanistan	1st	155
Iran	1st	20
Kyrgyzstan (co-hosts)	1st	96
Oman (invitee)	1st	73
Tajikistan	1st	109
Turkmenistan	1st	137
Uzbekistan (co-hosts)	1st	74

=== Seeding ===
The following 7 teams were divided based on their FIFA Ranking of April 2023.

Pot 1	Pot 2	Pot 3	Pot 4
Iran (20); Uzbekistan (74) (co-hosts)	Kyrgyzstan (96) (co-hosts); Tajikistan (109)	Turkmenistan (137); Afghanistan (155)	Oman (73) (invitee)

=== Draw results ===
The draw was held in Dushanbe on 26 April 2023 at 14:00 Time in Tajikistan (UTC+5). The draw resulted in the following groups:

Group A
Pos	Team
A1	Uzbekistan
A2	Tajikistan
A3	Turkmenistan
A4	Oman

Group B
Pos	Team
B1	Kyrgyzstan
B2	Iran
B3	Afghanistan

== Venues ==
Kyrgyzstan
Bishkek		2023 CAFA Nations Cup (Kyrgyzstan)
Dolen Omurzakov Stadium		2023 CAFA Nations Cup (Kyrgyzstan)
Capacity: 23,000		2023 CAFA Nations Cup (Kyrgyzstan)
Uzbekistan
Tashkent		2023 CAFA Nations Cup (Uzbekistan)
Pakhtakor Central Stadium	Milliy Stadium	2023 CAFA Nations Cup (Uzbekistan)
Capacity: 35,000	Capacity: 34,000	2023 CAFA Nations Cup (Uzbekistan)

== Squads ==
Each nation needed to submit a squad of 26 players, including 3 goalkeepers.

== Officials ==
Referees

- Hassan Akrami (Iran)
- Nurzatbek Abdikadirov (Kyrgyzstan)
- Dayirbek Abdilaev (Kyrgyzstan)
- Kirill Levnikov (Russia)
- Sadullo Gulmurodi (Tajikistan)
- Charymurad Kurbanov (Turkmenistan)
- Akhrol Riskullaev (Uzbekistan)

Assistant Referees

- Mohd Sharif Sarwari (Afghanistan)
- Mohammadreza Mansouri (Iran)
- Hassan Zeheyri (Iran)
- Sergey Grischenko (Kyrgyzstan)
- Eldiyar Saribaev (Kyrgyzstan)
- Yegor Bolkhovitin (Russia)
- Andrey Vereteshkin (Russia)
- Khusravi Siddikzod (Tajikistan)
- Ahmed Begnazarov (Turkmenistan)
- Sanjar Shayusupov (Uzbekistan)
- Asker Nadjafaliyev (Uzbekistan)

== Sponsors ==
(Cyprus) 1xBet

== Broadcasting rights ==
The following channels have been given broadcasting rights to broadcast the tournament.

Territory	Rights holder(s)
Uzbekistan	UzNTRC Sport
Kyrgyzstan	Kyrgyz Sport TV
Tajikistan	TV Futbol
Iran	IRIB TV3

== Group stage ==
All times are local, Uzbekistan Time (UTC+5) & Kyrgyzstan Time (UTC+6).

Tiebreakers

Teams were ranked according to points (3 points for a win, 1 point for a draw, 0 points for a loss), and if tied on points, the following tie-breaking criteria were applied, in the order given, to determine the rankings.

1. Points in head-to-head matches among tied teams;
2. Goal difference in head-to-head matches among tied teams;
3. Goals scored in head-to-head matches among tied teams;
4. If more than two teams are tied, and after applying all head-to-head criteria above, a subset of teams are still tied, all head-to-head criteria above are reapplied exclusively to this subset of teams;
5. Goal difference in all group matches;
6. Goals scored in all group matches;
7. Penalty shoot-out if only two teams were tied and they met in the last round of the group;
8. Disciplinary points (yellow card = 1 point, red card as a result of two yellow cards = 3 points, direct red card = 3 points, yellow card followed by direct red card = 4 points);
9. Drawing of lots.

=== Group A ===
Pos	Team	Pld	W	D	L	GF	GA	GD	Pts	Qualification
1	Uzbekistan (H)	3	3	0	0	10	1	+9	9	Advance to final
2	Oman	3	1	1	1	3	4	−1	4	Advance to third place match
3	Tajikistan	3	0	2	1	3	7	−4	2	
4	Turkmenistan	3	0	1	2	1	5	−4	1	

Source: Soccerway
(H) Hosts
11 June 2023
18:30

Tajikistan	1–1	Turkmenistan
Khamrokulov 86'	Report	Annaýew 57'

Pakhtakor Central Stadium, Tashkent
Attendance: 97
Referee: Hassan Akrami (Iran)
11 June 2023
20:30

Uzbekistan	3–0	Oman
Masharipov 7', 24'; Alijonov 89'	Report

Milliy Stadium, Tashkent
Attendance: 12,912
Referee: Dayirbek Abdilaev (Kyrgyzstan)

14 June 2023
18:30

Oman	1–1	Tajikistan
Al-Yahyaei 14' (pen.)	Report	Khanonov 45'

Pakhtakor Central Stadium, Tashkent
Attendance: 110
Referee: Kirill Levnikov (Russia)
14 June 2023
20:30

Uzbekistan	2–0	Turkmenistan
Shomurodov 51', 85'	Report

Milliy Stadium, Tashkent
Attendance: 14,410
Referee: Nurzatbek Abdikadirov (Kyrgyzstan)

17 June 2023
18:30

Turkmenistan	0–2	Oman
	Report	A. Al-Mushaifri 42'; Al-Sabhi 76'

Pakhtakor Central Stadium, Tashkent
Attendance: 126
Referee: Dayirbek Abdilaev (Kyrgyzstan)
17 June 2023
20:30

Uzbekistan	5–1	Tajikistan
Yakhshiboev 53'; Shomurodov 56' (pen.); Fayzullaev 72'; Erkinov 83'; Urunov 90+6' (pen.)	Report	Umarbayev 14'

Milliy Stadium, Tashkent
Attendance: 9,099
Referee: Hassan Akrami (Iran)

=== Group B ===
Pos	Team	Pld	W	D	L	GF	GA	GD	Pts	Qualification
1	Iran	2	2	0	0	11	2	+9	6	Advance to final
2	Kyrgyzstan (H)	2	1	0	1	4	5	−1	3	Advance to third place match
3	Afghanistan	2	0	0	2	1	9	−8	0	

Source: Soccerway
(H) Hosts
10 June 2023
21:00

Kyrgyzstan	Awarded 3–0	Afghanistan
Batyrkanov 90+7'	Report

Dolen Omurzakov Stadium, Bishkek
Attendance: 8,876
Referee: Charymurad Kurbanov (Turkmenistan)

The match was abandoned in the 97th minute with Kyrgyzstan leading 1–0 after Afghanistan walked off and refused to continue. The match was awarded 3–0 to Kyrgyzstan.

13 June 2023
21:00

Iran	6–1	Afghanistan
Azmoun 20'; Taremi 21', 28', 51'; Jahanbakhsh 45'; Asadi 67'	Report	Noor 57'

Dolen Omurzakov Stadium, Bishkek
Attendance: 33
Referee: Sadullo Gulmurodi (Tajikistan)

16 June 2023
21:00

Kyrgyzstan	1–5	Iran
Murzayev 52'	Report	Taremi 34', 39' (pen.), 56'; Azmoun 66', 79'

Dolen Omurzakov Stadium, Bishkek
Attendance: 9,927
Referee: Akhrol Riskullaev (Uzbekistan)

== Knockout round ==
=== Third place match ===
20 June 2023
18:30

Kyrgyzstan	0–1	Oman
	Report	Arshad 71'

Pakhtakor Central Stadium, Tashkent
Attendance: 186
Referee: Akhrol Riskullaev (Uzbekistan)

=== Final ===
20 June 2023
20:30

Uzbekistan	0–1	Iran
	Report	Azmoun 48'

Milliy Stadium, Tashkent
Attendance: 34,000
Referee: Kirill Levnikov (Russia)

== Goalscorers ==
There were 33 goals scored in 11 matches, for an average of 3 goals per match.

6 goals

- (Iran) Mehdi Taremi

4 goals

- (Iran) Sardar Azmoun

3 goals

- (Uzbekistan) Eldor Shomurodov

2 goals

- (Uzbekistan) Jaloliddin Masharipov

1 goal

- (Afghanistan) Farshad Noor
- (Iran) Reza Asadi
- (Iran) Alireza Jahanbakhsh
- (Kyrgyzstan) Ernist Batyrkanov
- (Kyrgyzstan) Mirlan Murzayev
- (Oman) Arshad Al-Alawi
- (Oman) Abdulrahman Al-Mushaifri
- (Oman) Issam Al-Sabhi
- (Oman) Salaah Al-Yahyaei
- (Tajikistan) Nuriddin Khamrokulov
- (Tajikistan) Vakhdat Khanonov
- (Tajikistan) Parvizdzhon Umarbayev
- (Turkmenistan) Myrat Annaýew
- (Uzbekistan) Khojiakbar Alijonov
- (Uzbekistan) Khojimat Erkinov
- (Uzbekistan) Abbosbek Fayzullaev
- (Uzbekistan) Oston Urunov
- (Uzbekistan) Jasurbek Yakhshiboev

== Awards ==
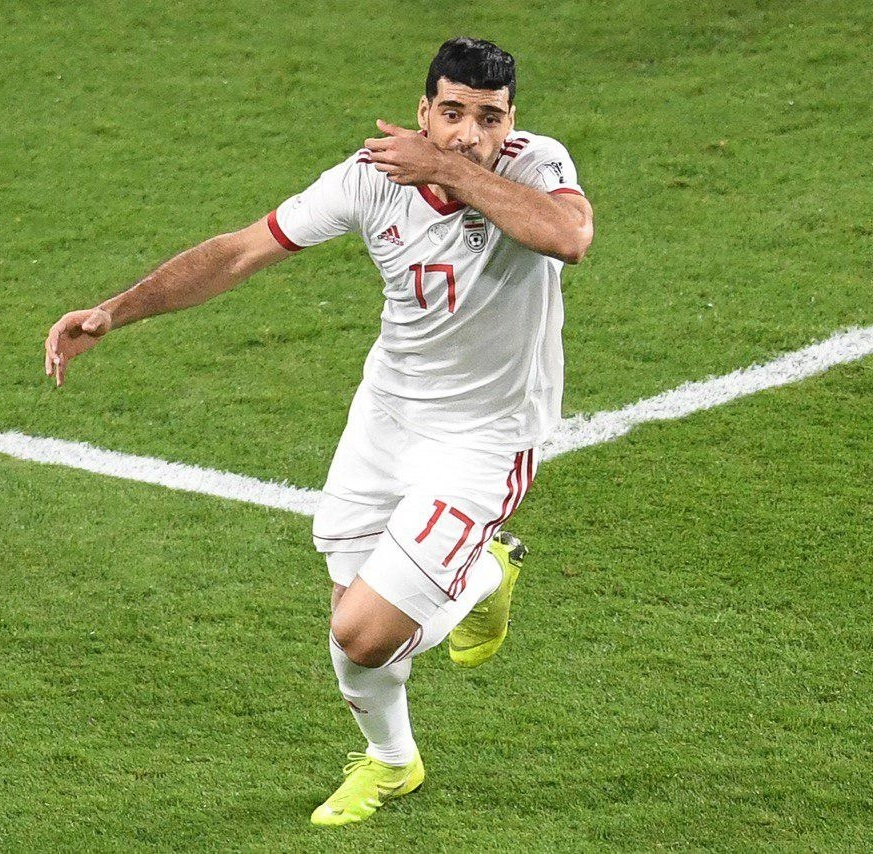
Mehdi Taremi finished the tournament as top scorer and was named best player.

The following awards were presented at the end of the tournament:

Best Player

- (Iran) Mehdi Taremi

Top Goalscorer

- (Iran) Mehdi Taremi

Best Goalkeeper

- (Oman) Ibrahim Al-Muhkaini

Fair Play Award

- Uzbekistan

== See also ==
- 2023 SAFF Championship
- 2022 AFF Championship
- 2022 EAFF E-1 Football Championship
- 2023 WAFF Championship
- 2023 AFC Asian Cup
