= Uzbekistan national football team results =

The lists of Uzbekistan national football team results.

== Current season ==
=== 2020 ===
23 February 2020 Friendly	Uzbekistan	0–1	Belarus	Al Hamriyah, United Arab Emirates
18:00		Report	Nyakhaychyk 26'	Stadium: Al Hamriya Sports Club Stadium; Referee: Omar Muhammad Alali (United Arab Emirates)

3 September 2020 Friendly	Uzbekistan	2–1	Tajikistan	Tashkent, Uzbekistan
19:00 UTC+5	Ubaydullaev 33'; Kholmukhamedov 67' (pen.)	Report	Juraboev 48'	Stadium: Lokomotiv Stadium; Attendance: 0 Referee: Akhrol Riskullaev (Uzbekistan)

8 October 2020 Friendly	Uzbekistan	1–2	Iran	Tashkent, Uzbekistan
18:00 UTC+5	Shomurodov 53'	Report	Azmoun 44'; Taremi 51' (pen.)	Stadium: Pakhtakor Central Stadium; Attendance: 1,000; Referee: Jasur Muxtarov (Uzbekistan)

12 October 2020 Friendly	United Arab Emirates	1–2	Uzbekistan	Dubai, United Arab Emirates
18:20 UTC+4	Tagliabué 90+1' (pen.)	Report	Sergeev 48', 86'	Stadium: Rashid Stadium; Attendance: 0 Referee: Ali Abdulnabi (Bahrain)

12 November 2020 Friendly	Uzbekistan	0–1	Syria	Sharjah, United Arab Emirates
		Report	Al Mawas 48'	Stadium: Sharjah Stadium; Attendance: 0 Referee: Omar Muhammad Alali (United Arab Emirates)

17 November 2020 Friendly	Uzbekistan	1–2	Iraq	Dubai, United Arab Emirates
18:00 UTC+4	Khamdamov 39' (pen.)	Report	Ali 64'; Adnan 85' (pen.)	Stadium: The Sevens Stadium; Referee: Adel Ali Al Naqbi (United Arab Emirates)

=== 2019 ===
9 January 2019 2019 AFC Asian Cup	Uzbekistan	2–1	Oman	Sharjah, United Arab Emirates
17:30 UTC+4	Ahmedov 34'; Shomurodov 85'	Report	Mu. Al-Ghassani 72'	Stadium: Sharjah Stadium; Attendance: 9,424; Referee: Ko Hyung-jin (South Korea)

13 January 2019 2019 AFC Asian Cup	Turkmenistan	0–4	Uzbekistan	Dubai, United Arab Emirates
20:00 UTC+4		Report	Sidikov 17'; Shomurodov 24', 42'; Masharipov 40'	Stadium: Rashid Stadium; Attendance: 4,354; Referee: Ammar Al-Jeneibi (United Arab Emirates)

17 January 2019 2019 AFC Asian Cup	Japan	2–1	Uzbekistan	Al Ain, United Arab Emirates
17:30 UTC+4	Muto 43'; Shiotani 58'	Report	Shomurodov 40'	Stadium: Khalifa bin Zayed Stadium; Attendance: 7,005; Referee: Mohammed Abdulla Hassan Mohamed (United Arab Emirates)

21 January 2019 2019 AFC Asian Cup	Australia	0–0 (a.e.t.) (4–2 p)	Uzbekistan	Al Ain, United Arab Emirates
18:00 UTC+4		Report		Stadium: Khalifa bin Zayed Stadium; Attendance: 6,809; Referee: Abdulrahman Al-Jassim (Qatar)
	Penalties
	Milligan (penalty scored); Behich (penalty missed); Kruse (penalty scored); Giannou (penalty scored); Leckie (penalty scored)		(penalty scored) Shukurov; (penalty missed) Tukhtakhodjaev; (penalty scored) Alibaev; (penalty missed) Bikmaev

22 March 2019 2019 China Cup	Uzbekistan	0–3	Uruguay	Nanning, China
19:35 UTC+8		Report	Pereiro 5'; Stuani 23', 82'	Stadium: Guangxi Sports Center; Attendance: 18,000; Referee: Milorad Mažić (Serbia)

25 March 2019 2019 China Cup	China	0–1	Uzbekistan	Nanning, China
15:30 UTC+8		Report	Shomurodov 34'	Stadium: Guangxi Sports Center; Attendance: 10,391; Referee: Mohammed Al-Shammari (Qatar)

2 June 2019 Friendly	Turkey	2–0	Uzbekistan	Alanya, Turkey
21:00 UTC+3	Çelik 17', 57'	Report		Stadium: Alanya Stadium; Attendance: 9,000; Referee: Srđan Jovanović (Serbia)

7 June 2019 Friendly	Uzbekistan	4–0	North Korea	Tashkent, Uzbekistan
21:00 UTC+6	Ahmedov 29' (pen.); Abdukholiqov 65'; Sergeev 68'; Tursunov 90+2'	Report		Stadium: Milliy Stadium; Attendance: 31,000; Referee: Çarymyrat Kurbanow (Turkmenistan)

11 June 2019 Friendly	Uzbekistan	2–0	Syria	Tashkent, Uzbekistan
	Shomurodov 3', 42'	Report		Stadium: Milliy Stadium; Attendance: 32,000; Referee: Rysbek Shekerbekov (Kyrgyzstan)

5 September 2019 2022 WCQ - AFC 2nd Round	Palestine	2–0	Uzbekistan	Al-Ram, Palestine
17:00 UTC+3	Dabbagh 60'; Batran 85'	Report (FIFA); Report (AFC)		Stadium: Faisal Al-Husseini International Stadium; Attendance: 6,740; Referee: Fu Ming (China)

10 September 2019 Friendly	Uzbekistan	0–0	Iraq	Amman, Jordan
21:00 UTC+3		Report		Stadium: King Abdullah II Stadium; Attendance: 1,800; Referee: Ahmad Faysal (Jordan)

10 October 2019 2022 WCQ - AFC 2nd Round	Uzbekistan	5–0	Yemen	Tashkent, Uzbekistan
17:00 UTC+5	Kodirkulov 3'; Shomurodov 33'; Iskanderov 53'; Tukhtakhodjaev 73'; Sergeev 90'	Report (FIFA); Report (AFC)		Stadium: Pakhtakor Stadium; Attendance: 28,571; Referee: Hanna Hattab (Syria)

15 October 2019 2022 WCQ - AFC 2nd Round	Singapore	1–3	Uzbekistan	Kallang, Singapore
19:45 UTC+8	Ikhsan 45+1'	Report (FIFA); Report (AFC)	Ahmedov 15'; Shomurodov 51', 90+2'	Stadium: National Stadium; Attendance: 12,547; Referee: Shen Yinhao (China)

9 November 2019 Friendly	Uzbekistan	3–1	Kyrgyzstan	Tashkent, Uzbekistan
17:00 UTC+5	Sergeev 11'; Khamdamov 53'; Iskanderov 80'	Report	Musabekov 30'	Stadium: Pakhtakor Stadium; Attendance: 11,000; Referee: Bastian Dankert (Germany)

14 November 2019 2022 WCQ - AFC 2nd Round	Uzbekistan	2–3	Saudi Arabia	Tashkent, Uzbekistan
17:00 UTC+5	Shomurodov 16'; Shukurov 56' (pen.)	Report (FIFA); Report (AFC)	Al-Faraj 23' (pen.), 85'; Al-Dawsari 90'	Stadium: Pakhtakor Stadium; Attendance: 31,524; Referee: Ryuji Sato (Japan)

19 November 2019 2022 WCQ - AFC 2nd Round	Uzbekistan	2–0	Palestine	Tashkent, Uzbekistan
17:00 UTC+5	Shomurodov 18', 58'	Report (FIFA); Report (AFC)		Stadium: Pakhtakor Stadium; Attendance: 19,143; Referee: Nawaf Shukralla (Bahrain)

== Best / Worst Results ==
=== Best ===
As of 1 July 2021

Number	Year	Opponent	Result
1	1998	Mongolia	15 – 0
2	2007	Chinese Taipei	9 – 0
3	2000	Mongolia	8 – 1
4	2001	Chinese Taipei	7 – 0
5	1997	Cambodia	6 – 0
6	1999	Bangladesh	6 – 0
7	1999	Sri Lanka	6 – 0
8	2007	Kyrgyzstan	6 – 0
9	2004	Chinese Taipei	6 – 1
10	1994	Malaysia	5 – 0
11	1996	Tajikistan	5 – 0
12	2001	Oman	5 – 0
13	2006	Bangladesh	5 – 0
14	2019	Yemen	5 – 0
15	2021	Singapore	5 – 0

=== Worst ===
As of 1 July 2021

Number	Year	Opponent	Result
1	2000	Japan	1 – 8
2	2011	Australia	0 – 6
3	1997	South Korea	1 – 5
4	2015	Japan	1 – 5
5	1996	Tajikistan	0 – 4
6	1996	Japan	0 – 4
7	1998	Iran	0 – 4
8	2008	Saudi Arabia	0 – 4
9	2010	Saudi Arabia	0 – 4
10	2018	South Korea	0 – 4
11	1997	Japan	3 – 6
12	2001	United Arab Emirates	1 – 4
13	2002	Slovakia	1 – 4
14	2004	Thailand	1 – 4

== See also ==
- Uzbekistan national football team head-to-head record
- Uzbekistan women's national football team results
