= Vincenzo Camilleri =

Italian footballer (born 1992)

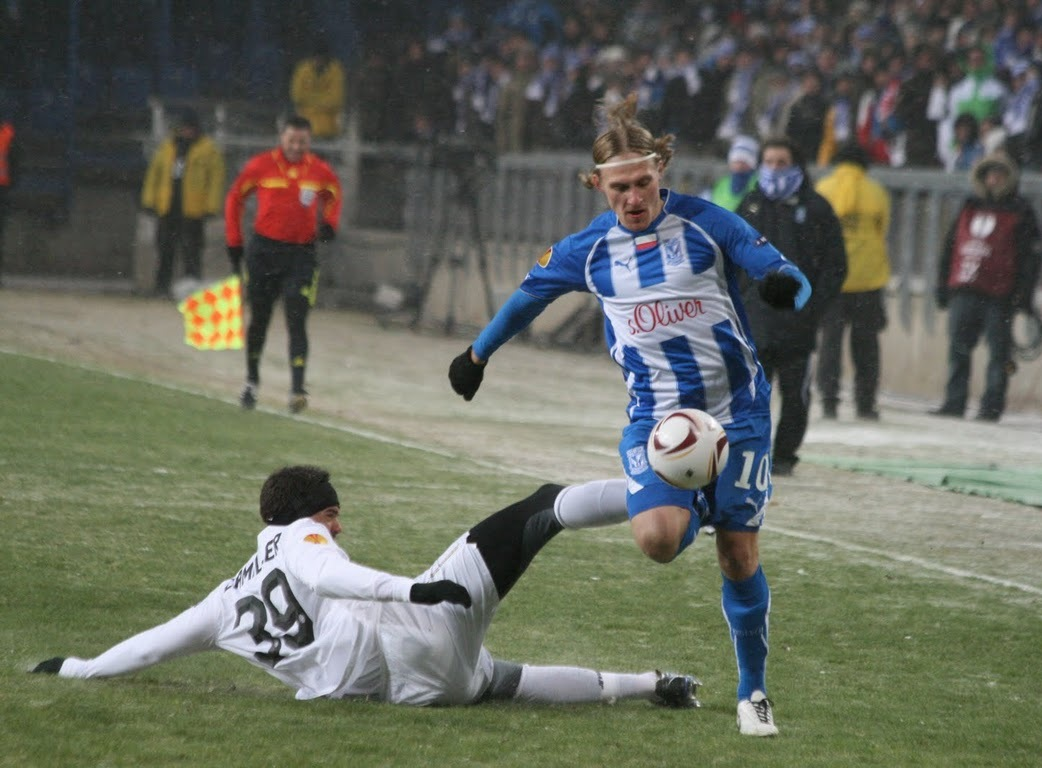

Personal information
- Date of birth: 6 March 1992 (age 34)
- Place of birth: Gela, Italy
- Height: 1.92 m (6 ft 4 in)
- Position: Defender

Team information
- Current team: Folgore Caratese
- Number: 13

Youth career
- 2006–2007: Reggina

Senior career*
Years	Team	Apps	(Gls)
2007–2008	Reggina	0	(0)
2008–2009	Chelsea	0	(0)
2009–2015	Reggina	23	(0)
2010–2011	→ Juventus (loan)	0	(0)
2011–2012	→ FeralpiSalò (loan)	23	(0)
2012–2013	→ Cagliari (loan)	0	(0)
2013–2014	→ Barletta (loan)	37	(0)
2015–2016	Brescia	15	(0)
2016–2017	Paganese	15	(3)
2017	Teramo	3	(0)
2017–2018	Sicula Leonzio	30	(2)
2018–2019	Vibonese	30	(2)
2019–2021	Pistoiese	41	(1)
2021	→ Viterbese (loan)	14	(0)
2021	Viterbese	0	(0)
2021–2022	Lamezia Terme	14	(0)
2022–2023	Messina	17	(0)
2023	Imolese	14	(0)
2023–2023	Gelbison	11	(1)
2023–2024	Barletta	15	(1)
2024–	Folgore Caratese	7	(1)

International career
2007	Italy U16	1	(0)
2009	Italy U17	6	(0)
2010	Italy U18	4	(0)
- * Club domestic league appearances and goals as of 17 November 2024

Vincenzo Camilleri (born 6 March 1992) is an Italian professional footballer who plays as a defender for Serie D club Folgore Caratese.

== Career ==
Born in Gela, Sicily, Camilleri began his career with the youth team of Reggina, and made his first team debut on 19 December 2007 as a half-time substitute in a Coppa Italia 2007–08 home game against Inter, which ended in a 4–1 loss for Camilleri's side. Later in February 2008 he became the subject of a controversial approach from English club Chelsea. In March 2008, after his 16th birthday, he left Reggina to move to England and join the Chelsea club academy; he consequently received a two-month ban by the Italian Federation due to breach of transfer rules, caused by Camilleri's parents not having asked permission to Reggina before entering talks with Chelsea; the ban applied only on Italian domestic games. The Italian Federation also agreed to suspend indefinitely Camilleri from playing at youth international level with Italy; he was playing at Under-16 level at the time of his move to Chelsea. However, the youngster ultimately failed to settle in England and was allowed to return to Reggina later in January 2009.

On 19 April 2009 Camilleri made his Serie A debut for Reggina as a substitute for Luca Vigiani in an away win to Atalanta. Later on 31 May 2009 he also marked his first appearance as a starter, playing 64 minutes in the final game of the season, ended in a 1–1 home draw to Siena. He was later confirmed as part of the Reggina roster for their 2009–10 Serie B campaign.

On 29 August 2010 Camilleri moved to Juventus in a loan deal, for €170,000, with an option for the Turin giants to acquire 50% of the player's transfer rights at the end of the season. His no.5 shirt of Reggina was stripped (given to Burzigotti) and took Gleison Santos's no.33 shirt at the start of season.

An injury crisis involving the first team gave Camilleri the opportunity to make his senior debut with the bianconeri on 1 December 2010, playing the whole 90 minutes of a 2010–11 UEFA Europa League game against Polish side Lech Poznań. His second appearance for Juventus came as a second-half substitute in the following UEFA Europa League game, this time at home against Manchester City. Since then, Camilleri did not play any other first team games, and he left Juventus at the end of the season after the club opted not to sign the player.

After returning to Reggina, Camilleri was once again excluded from the first-team squad and sent on loan to Lega Pro Prima Divisione minnows FeralpiSalò for the 2011–12 season. Camilleri also changed to wear no.92 shirt at the start of season (his year of birth).

In July 2012 Cagliari signed him in temporary deal, however he was injured.

On 10 July 2018, Camilleri signed with Serie C club Vibonese.

On 31 August 2019, he signed a two-year contract with Pistoiese. On 1 February 2021, he joined Viterbese on loan.

He signed for Serie D club Lamezia Terme in August 2021.

Camilleri joined Messina on 31 January 2022.

On 12 January 2023, Camilleri moved to Imolese. He moved to Barletta in December 2023.

== Career statistics ==
As of match played 16 April 2022

Appearances and goals by club, season and competition
Club	Season	League			National Cup		Continental		Other		Total	
Club	Season	Division	Apps	Goals	Apps	Goals	Apps	Goals	Apps	Goals	Apps	Goals
Reggina	2007–08	Serie A	0	0	1	0	—		—		1	0
Reggina	2008–09	Serie A	2	0	0	0	—		—		2	0
Reggina	2009–10	Serie B	0	0	1	0	—		—		1	0
Reggina	2010–11	Serie B	0	0	1	0	—		—		1	0
Reggina	2012–13	Serie B	0	0	1	0	—		—		1	0
Reggina	2014–15	Lega Pro	21	0	1	0	—		—		22	0
Reggina	Total		23	0	5	0	0	0	0	0	28	0
Juventus (loan)	2010–11	Serie A	0	0	0	0	2 (Note: Appearance(s) in UEFA Europa League)	0	—		2	0
FeralpiSalò (loan)	2011–12	Lega Pro	23	0	0	0	—		—		23	0
Cagliari (loan)	2012–13	Serie A	0	0	1	0	—		—		1	0
Barletta (loan)	2012–13	Lega Pro	11	0	0	0	—		2 (Note: Appearance(s) in Relegation Playoffs)	0	13	0
Barletta (loan)	2013–14	Lega Pro	26	0	0	0	—		—		26	0
Barletta (loan)	Total		37	0	0	0	0	0	2	0	39	0
Brescia	2015–16	Serie B	15	0	0	0	—		—		15	0
Paganese	2016–17	Lega Pro	15	3	0	0	—		—		15	3
Teramo	2016–17	Lega Pro	3	0	0	0	—		—		3	0
Sicula Leonzio	2017–18	Serie C	30	2	0	0	—		1 (Note: Appearance(s) in Promotion Playoffs)	0	31	2
Vibonese	2018–19	Serie C	30	2	0	0	—		—		30	2
Pistoiese	2019–20	Serie C	24	1	0	0	—		—		24	1
Pistoiese	2020–21	Serie C	17	0	0	0	—		—		17	0
Pistoiese	Total		41	1	0	0	0	0	0	0	41	1
Viterbese (loan)	2020–21	Serie C	14	0	—		—		—		14	0
Lamezia Terme	2021–22	Serie D	14	0	—		—		—		14	0
Messina	2021–22	Serie C	8	0	—		—		—		8	0
Career total			253	8	5	0	2	0	3	0	264	8
