= Nattapon Malapun =

Thai footballer (born 1994)

Personal information
- Full name: Nattapon Malapun
- Date of birth: 10 January 1994 (age 32)
- Place of birth: Chaiyaphum, Thailand
- Height: 1.84 m (6 ft 1/2 in)
- Positions: Centre back; right back

Team information
- Current team: PT Prachuap
- Number: 27

Youth career
- 2010–2012: Suankularb Wittayalai School

Senior career*
Years	Team	Apps	(Gls)
2013	Nonthaburi	4	(0)
2014–2015	Police United	6	(0)
2016–2020	Buriram United	11	(0)
2016–2018	→ Chonburi (loan)	48	(1)
2019	→ PT Prachuap (loan)	13	(0)
2020	→ Samut Prakan City (loan)	2	(0)
2020–2022	Suphanburi	28	(0)
2022–	PT Prachuap	24	(0)

International career^{‡}
2016–2019	Thailand	3	(0)
- * Club domestic league appearances and goals ‡ National team caps and goals as of 25 March 2019

Nattapon Malapun (Thai: นัสตพล มาลาพันธ์; born 10 January 1994) is a Thai professional footballer who plays as a centre back or a right back for Thai League 1 club PT Prachuap and the Thailand national team.

== International career ==
In November 2016, he played for Thailand in the 2018 FIFA World Cup qualification (AFC) against Australia.

=== International ===
As of 25 March 2019

National team	Year	Apps	Goals
Thailand	2016	1	0
Thailand	2019	2	0
Thailand	Total	3	0

== Honours ==
=== International ===
Thailand

- King's Cup (1): 2017

Runner up

- China Cup (1): 2019

=== Club ===
Police United

- Thai Division 1 League (1) : 2015

PT Prachuap

- Thai League Cup (1) : 2019
