= Cristhian Stuani =

Uruguayan footballer (born 1986)

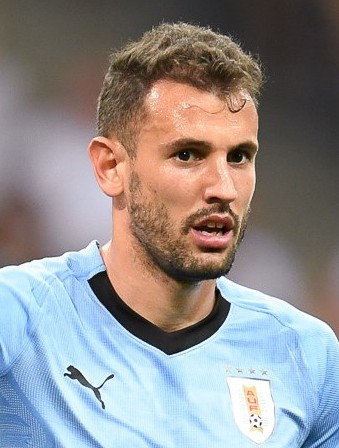
- Stuani with Uruguay at the 2018 FIFA World Cup

Personal information
- Full name: Cristhian Ricardo Stuani Curbelo
- Date of birth: 12 October 1986 (age 40)
- Place of birth: Tala, Uruguay
- Height: 1.86 m (6 ft 1 in)
- Position: Striker

Team information
- Current team: Girona
- Number: 7

Youth career
- Danubio

Senior career*
Years	Team	Apps	(Gls)
2004–2007	Danubio	36	(23)
2006–2007	→ Bella Vista (loan)	14	(12)
2008–2012	Reggina	18	(1)
2009–2010	→ Albacete (loan)	39	(22)
2010–2011	→ Levante (loan)	30	(8)
2011–2012	→ Racing Santander (loan)	32	(9)
2012–2015	Espanyol	103	(25)
2015–2017	Middlesbrough	59	(11)
2017–	Girona	281	(135)

International career
2003	Uruguay U17	12	(3)
2005	Uruguay U20	15	(6)
2012–2019	Uruguay	50	(8)
- * Club domestic league appearances and goals as of 20:25, 24 October 2026 (UTC)

Cristhian Ricardo Stuani Curbelo (Spanish pronunciation: [ˈkɾistjan esˈtwani]; born 12 October 1986) is a Uruguayan professional footballer who plays as a striker for and captains Segunda División club Girona.

He started out at Danubio, being bought by Reggina in 2008. He went on to spend the vast majority of his extensive career in Spain, in representation of several clubs, including Levante, Racing de Santander and Espanyol in La Liga. He signed with Middlesbrough from England in 2015 and, two years later, joined Girona where he participated in the 2024–25 Champions League and was the Segunda División top scorer twice.

Stuani made his debut for Uruguay in 2012 and appeared for the nation at two World Cups and three Copa América tournaments. He also held an Italian passport.

== Club career ==
=== Danubio ===
Born in Tala, Canelones, Stuani started his professional career with Danubio. In 2005, he went on loan to Bella Vista in the Uruguayan Segunda División, performing well enough to be recalled.

=== Reggina ===
In January 2008, after scoring 19 goals in the 2007 Apertura with Danubio, Stuani was signed by Reggina in Italy, penning a four-year contract with the Serie A club. He made his official debut on the 12th, playing 30 minutes in a 1–1 away draw against Empoli.

When Stuani joined, the Reggio Calabria team was second from bottom and had the fewest goals scored, following Rolando Bianchi's departure for Manchester City the previous summer; he went scoreless in 12 games, but they managed to stay up. In 2008–09, he scored his only league goal from a penalty kick in the last round, a 1–1 home draw against Siena, having only appeared in four more matches during the entire season, which ended in top-flight relegation.

On 31 July 2009, Stuani joined Albacete in the Segunda División, on loan. He finished the campaign with 22 goals in 39 matches, including hat-tricks in victories over Castellón and Córdoba, putting him in second in the scoring charts behind Elche's Jorge Molina, but his side only finished two points above the relegation zone.

Stuani remained in the country and on loan for 2010–11, but moved to La Liga with Levante. He was used mostly as a backup to Felipe Caicedo, but still contributed eight goals – second-best in the squad – as the Valencians easily retained their status, netting twice in a 3–1 home defeat of Málaga.

In the next season, Stuani was loaned to another side in the Spanish top flight, Racing de Santander. In December 2011, he scored a brace in each leg of the Copa del Rey tie against Rayo Vallecano, including a late penalty in the second game which secured a win on the away goals rule following a 6–6 aggregate draw.

=== Espanyol ===
In summer 2012, Stuani was linked with a move to Deportivo de La Coruña and even passed his medical but, on 28 August, he signed a four-year contract with Espanyol even though that club and Reggina had initially agreed on a season-long loan.

Stuani netted 12 times in his last year at the Estadi Cornellà-El Prat, only trailing Sergio García's 14 in his team.

=== Middlesbrough ===
On 15 July 2015, Middlesbrough reached an agreement for the transfer of Stuani, with the deal being completed after receiving international clearance on 7 August, for a rumoured €3 million fee. His first appearance in the Football League Championship occurred on 9 August, as he replaced Kike García in the 77th minute of an eventual 0–0 away draw against Preston North End. Three days later he made his first start, in the opening round of the League Cup, scoring in each half of a 3–1 win over Oldham Athletic at Boundary Park; he scored a brace again in the second round on the 25th, as his team came from behind to win at Burton Albion.

Stuani scored his first league goal on 29 August 2015, concluding a 3–1 victory at Sheffield Wednesday. Seventeen days later, he netted twice in a victory of the same margin against Brentford at the Riverside Stadium.

On 28 December 2015, Stuani finished Stewart Downing's cross in the 44th second for the only goal of the home game against Wednesday, putting Middlesbrough on top of the table. He did not find the net again until the final game of the season on the following 7 May, opening a 1–1 home draw with Brighton & Hove Albion which won promotion to the Premier League at the opponents' expense; the goal's worth was valued at £170 million.

On 21 August 2016, Stuani scored his first goals in the top division in his first game in the competition, grabbing a brace against Sunderland in a 2–1 win at the Stadium of Light.

=== Girona ===
On 21 July 2017, Stuani joined Girona – newly promoted to the Spanish top flight – for an undisclosed fee. He made his debut on 19 August, starting and scoring twice in a 2–2 home draw against Atlético Madrid. He finished his first year in fifth place of the scoring charts at 21 goals.

On 10 March 2019, Stuani became the club's all-time scorer in the top tier with 38 goals after a 2–3 loss to Valencia at the Estadi Montilivi, surpassing former holder Jandro; despite totalling 19 during the season to repeat the same position in the scoring department, the team succumbed to relegation on the last matchday.

Subsequently, a number of clubs approached Stuani for a summer move, most notably champions Barcelona. However, he eventually put pen to a contract extension with until 2023. He missed the first two league games due to a groin injury, but scored in his first appearance on 1 September 2019 to help the hosts defeat Málaga 1–0; he added a hat-trick the following weekend, at home to Rayo Vallecano (3–1).

Stuani scored a career-best 29 goals in 2019–20, adding 24 in 2021–22 as Girona returned to the main division via the play-offs. The veteran continue to feature heavily in the subsequent campaigns, notably helping them to third position in 2023–24 with a first-ever qualification for the UEFA Champions League; on 18 September 2024, by starting in the league phase of the latter competition at Paris Saint-Germain, he became the oldest outfield player to do so at the age of 37 years and 342 days, breaking the previous record of Donato in 2000.

On 27 July 2026, in spite of the side's relegation, Stuani signed a new one-year deal.

== International career ==
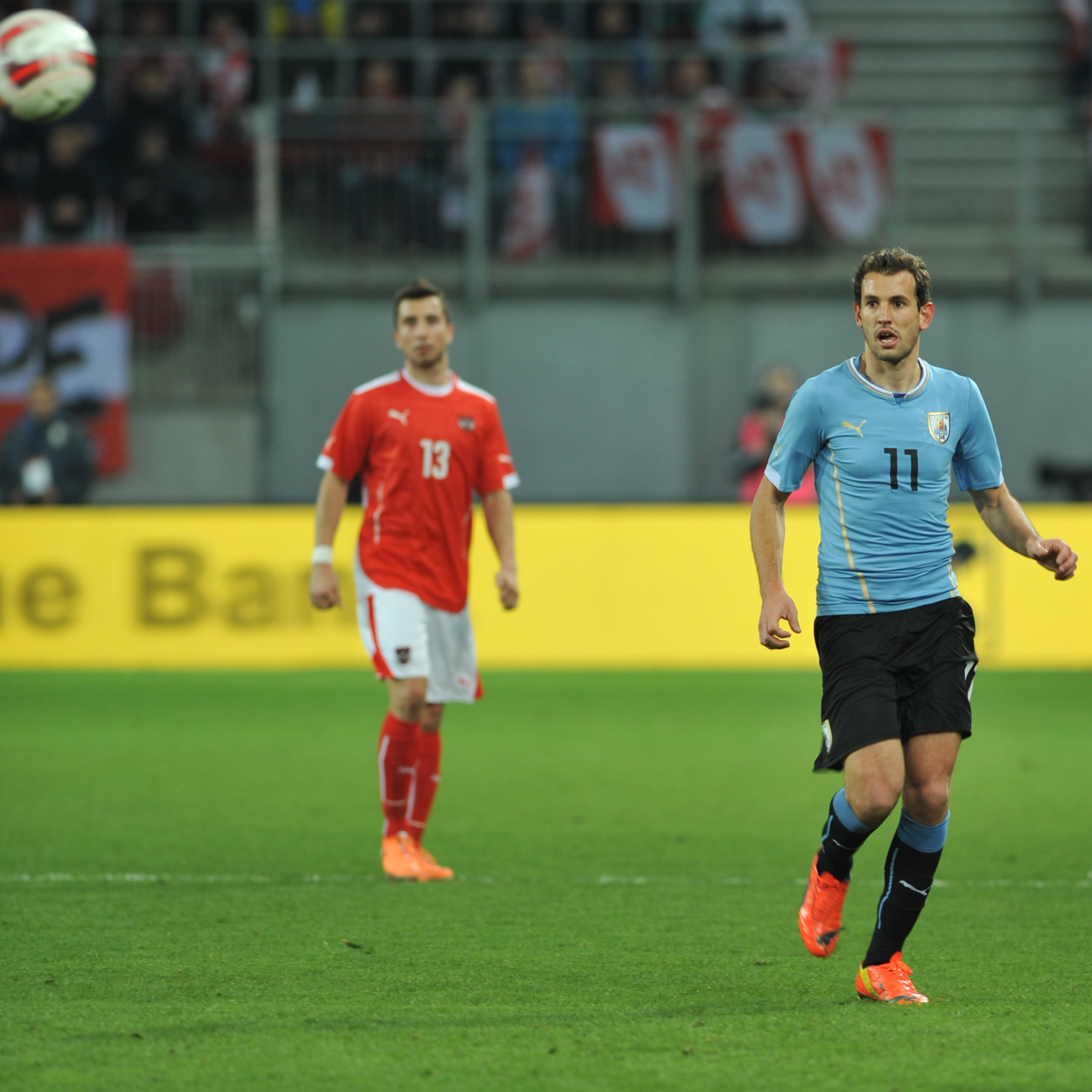
Stuani in action against Austria in 2014

Stuani made his senior debut for Uruguay on 14 November 2012, in a friendly with Poland (3–1 away win). On 10 September of the following year, he scored his first international goal, helping to a 2–0 home victory against Colombia for the 2014 FIFA World Cup qualifiers. On 13 November 2013, he netted the Charrúas' second in their 5–0 win in Jordan for the playoffs first leg, finishing Nicolás Lodeiro's cross at close range.

Stuani was selected by manager Óscar Tabárez for the finals in Brazil. He scored in both of Uruguay's warm-up matches for the tournament, the only goal of the game against Northern Ireland after coming on at half-time for Diego Forlán, and the second in a 2–0 win over Slovenia. He made his tournament debut on 14 June, starting in a 3–1 loss to Costa Rica in Fortaleza, and added a further three bench appearances in a round-of-16 exit.

Stuani was named in Uruguay's 2015 Copa América squad, as they attempted to defend their continental crown. He played twice for the quarter-finalists, in both cases as a substitute.

Stuani was included in the final 23-man squad for the 2018 World Cup in Russia. His first match in the competition took place on 30 June, when he replaced Edinson Cavani (who had scored twice) for the final 16 minutes of the 2–1 round-of-16 victory over Portugal. He started in the next match due to injury to the same teammate, and played 59 minutes in the 2–0 defeat against France.

In seven years of international action, Stuani earned 50 caps and scored eight goals.

== Career statistics ==
=== Club ===
As of match played 27 October 2026

Appearances and goals by club, season and competition
Club	Season	League			National cup (Note: Includes Copa del Rey, FA Cup)		League cup (Note: Includes Football League Cup)		Continental		Other		Total	
Club	Season	Division	Apps	Goals	Apps	Goals	Apps	Goals	Apps	Goals	Apps	Goals	Apps	Goals
Danubio	2004	Uruguayan Primera División	2	0	—		—		—		—		2	0
Danubio	2005	Uruguayan Primera División	5	0	—		—		—		—		5	0
Danubio	2005–06	Uruguayan Primera División	15	4	—		—		—		—		15	4
Danubio	2006–07	Uruguayan Primera División	0	0	—		—		—		—		0	0
Danubio	2007–08	Uruguayan Primera División	14	19	—		—		—		—		14	19
Danubio	Total		36	23	—		—		—		—		36	23
Bella Vista (loan)	2006–07	Uruguayan Primera División	14	12	—		—		—		—		14	12
Reggina	2007–08	Serie A	12	0	0	0	—		—		—		12	0
Reggina	2008–09	Serie A	6	1	0	0	—		—		—		6	1
Reggina	Total		18	1	0	0	—		—		—		18	1
Albacete (loan)	2009–10	Segunda División	39	22	0	0	—		—		—		39	22
Levante (loan)	2010–11	La Liga	30	8	3	2	—		—		—		33	10
Racing Santander (loan)	2011–12	La Liga	32	9	4	4	—		—		—		36	13
Espanyol	2012–13	La Liga	32	7	2	0	—		—		—		34	7
Espanyol	2013–14	La Liga	34	6	4	1	—		—		—		38	7
Espanyol	2014–15	La Liga	37	12	8	3	—		—		—		45	15
Espanyol	Total		103	25	14	4	—		—		—		117	29
Middlesbrough	2015–16	Championship	36	7	1	0	3	4	—		—		40	11
Middlesbrough	2016–17	Premier League	23	4	4	1	1	0	—		—		28	5
Middlesbrough	Total		59	11	5	1	4	4	—		—		68	16
Girona	2017–18	La Liga	33	21	0	0	—		—		—		33	21
Girona	2018–19	La Liga	32	19	2	1	—		—		—		34	20
Girona	2019–20	Segunda División	36	29	0	0	—		—		4 (Note: Appearances in La Liga play-offs)	2	40	31
Girona	2020–21	Segunda División	25	10	2	0	—		—		2	0	29	10
Girona	2021–22	Segunda División	37	22	1	0	—		—		4	2	42	24
Girona	2022–23	La Liga	32	9	2	1	—		—		—		34	10
Girona	2023–24	La Liga	31	9	5	5	—		—		—		36	14
Girona	2024–25	La Liga	32	11	1	0	—		8 (Note: Appearances in UEFA Champions League)	0	—		41	11
Girona	2025–26	La Liga	21	5	1	1	—		—		—		22	6
Girona	2026–27	Segunda División	3	0	1	0	—		—		—		4	0
Girona	Total		282	135	15	8	—		8	0	10	4	315	147
Career total			613	246	41	19	4	4	8	0	10	4	676	273

=== International ===
Appearances and goals by national team and year
National team	Year	Apps	Goals
Uruguay	2012	1	0
Uruguay	2013	6	2
Uruguay	2014	11	2
Uruguay	2015	8	1
Uruguay	2016	6	0
Uruguay	2017	6	0
Uruguay	2018	8	0
Uruguay	2019	4	3
Total		50	8

Scores and results list Uruguay's goal tally first, score column indicates score after each Stuani goal.

List of international goals scored by Cristhian Stuani
No.	Date	Venue	Opponent	Score	Result	Competition
1	10 September 2013	Estadio Centenario, Montevideo, Uruguay	Colombia	2–0	2–0	2014 FIFA World Cup qualification
2	13 November 2013	Amman International Stadium, Amman, Jordan	Jordan	2–0	5–0	2014 FIFA World Cup qualification
3	31 May 2014	Estadio Centenario, Montevideo, Uruguay	Northern Ireland	1–0	1–0	Friendly
4	5 June 2014	Estadio Centenario, Montevideo, Uruguay	Slovenia	2–0	2–0	Friendly
5	5 September 2015	Rommel Fernández, Panama City, Panama	Panama	1–0	1–0	Friendly
6	22 March 2019	Guangxi Sports Center, Nanning, China	Uzbekistan	2–0	3–0	2019 China Cup
7	22 March 2019	Guangxi Sports Center, Nanning, China	Uzbekistan	3–0	3–0	2019 China Cup
8	25 March 2019	Guangxi Sports Center, Nanning, China	Thailand	3–0	4–0	2019 China Cup

== Honours ==
Danubio

- Uruguayan Primera División: 2004

Individual

- Pichichi Trophy (Segunda División): 2019–20 (29 goals), 2021–22 (22 goals)
- Segunda División Player of the Month: December 2021
- Premier League Goal of the Month: August 2016
- China Cup Best Player: 2019
- China Cup top scorer: 2019
