= 2009–10 Reggina Calcio season =

Reggina
2009–10 season
- Chairman: Pasquale Foti
- Manager: Roberto Breda
- Serie B: 12th
- Coppa Italia: Fourth round
- Top goalscorer: Franco Brienza; Biagio Pagano (11)

Following are the results of the 2009–10 Reggina Calcio season in Italian football.

Reggina Calcio were among the favourites for an immediate return to Serie A, but failed to make a mark in an extremely competitive Serie B, and despite finishing in the midfield, it was long involved in the fight for survival in the second flight. On a positive note, defensive midfielder Carlos Carmona got his breakthrough, and following an inspired showing at the 2010 FIFA World Cup, the Chilean was sold to Atalanta for a good income.

== Squad ==
=== Goalkeepers ===
- (Italy) Vincenzo Fiorillo
- (Italy) Pietro Marino
- (Hungary) Adam Kovacsik

=== Defenders ===
- (Nigeria) Daniel Adejo
- (Italy) Andrea Costa
- (Italy) Vincenzo Camilleri
- (Uruguay) Carlos Valdez
- (Italy) Simone Rizzato
- (Brazil) Santos
- (Italy) Maurizio Lanzaro

=== Midfielders ===
- (Paraguay) José Montiel
- (Italy) Ivan Castiglia
- (Italy) Biagio Pagano
- (Italy) Luca Vigiani
- (Chile) (Spain) Carlos Carmona
- (Italy) Antonino Barillà
- (Italy) Giacomo Tedesco
- (Italy) Nicolas Viola
- (Italy) Emmanuel Cascione
- (Italy) Simone Missiroli
- (Italy) Franco Brienza

=== Attackers ===
- (Italy) Emiliano Bonazzoli
- (Italy) Daniele Cacia
- (Italy) Franco Brienza

== Serie B ==
Pos	Team	Pld	W	D	L	GF	GA	GD	Pts
11	AlbinoLeffe	42	14	13	15	59	56	+3	55
12	Modena	42	14	12	16	39	47	−8	54 (Note: MOD 1–0 REG; REG 0–1 MOD)
13	Reggina	42	15	9	18	51	56	−5	54
14	Vicenza	42	12	17	13	40	41	−1	53 (Note: VIC: 8 pts 4–1; PIA: 5 pts 4–5; FRO: 3 pts 4–6)
15	Piacenza	42	13	14	15	40	45	−5	53

Source: http://www.gazzetta.it/speciali/risultati_classifiche/2010/calcio/serieb/index.shtml
Rules for classification: 1) points; 2) goal difference; 3) number of goals scored.
