= 2007–08 Reggina Calcio season =

Reggina
2007–08 season
- Chairman: Pasquale Foti
- Manager: Massimo Ficcadenti; Renzo Ulivieri; Nevio Orlandi
- Serie A: 16th
- Coppa Italia: Last 16
- Top goalscorer: Nicola Amoruso (12)

Reggina Calcio managed to save its Serie A berth at the last minute, for the sixth consecutive season. Nicola Amoruso delivered 12 goals, which was five goals fewer than in the previous season, but enough to land a deal with Torino for the next season.

== Squad ==
=== Goalkeepers ===
- (Italy) Andrea Campagnolo
- (Serbia) Nenad Novaković

=== Defenders ===
- (Italy) Nicolò Cherubin
- (Italy) Andrea Costa
- (Italy) Bruno Cirillo
- (Italy) Salvatore Aronica
- (Denmark) Kris Stadsgaard
- (Portugal) Miguel Garcia
- (Uruguay) Carlos Adrián Valdez
- (Uruguay) Pablo Álvarez Menéndez
- (Italy) Francesco Modesto
- (Italy) Maurizio Lanzaro
- (Italy) Emmanuel Cascione

=== Midfielders ===
- (Italy) Luca Vigiani
- (Paraguay) Édgar Barreto
- (Italy) Francesco Cozza
- (Italy) Luca Tognozza
- (Iceland) Emil Hallfreðsson
- (Italy) Leonardo Pettinari
- (Italy) Simone Missiroli
- (Italy) Franco Brienza
- (Hungary) Lóránd Szatmári
- (Paraguay) José Montiel

=== Attackers ===
- (Uruguay) Cristhian Stuani
- (Brazil) Joelson
- (Italy) Nicola Amoruso
- (Nigeria) Stephen Makinwa
- (Italy) Fabio Ceravolo
- (Denmark) Mike Tullberg

== Serie A ==
Pos	Team	Pld	W	D	L	GF	GA	GD	Pts	Qualification or relegation
14	Cagliari (Note: Cagliari was docked 3 points for filing an unauthorized lawsuit, but the penalty was later reversed.)	38	11	9	18	40	56	−16	42	
15	Torino	38	8	16	14	36	49	−13	40 (Note: Torino finished ahead of Reggina on head-to-head points: Torino 2-2 Reggina, Reggina 1–3 Torino.)	
16	Reggina	38	9	13	16	37	56	−19	40	
17	Catania	38	8	13	17	33	45	−12	37	
18	Empoli (R)	38	9	9	20	29	52	−23	36	Relegation to Serie B

Source: Serie A
Rules for classification: 1) points; 2) head-to-head points; 3) head-to-head goal difference; 4) head-to-head goals scored; 5) goal difference; 6) number of goals scored.
(R) Relegated

=== Matches ===
- Reggina-Atalanta 1-1
- 1-0 Nicola Amoruso (76)
- 1-1 Cristiano Doni (84 pen)
- Torino-Reggina 2-2
- 0-1 Nicola Amoruso (31)
- 1-1 Alessandro Rosina (45)
- 2-1 Nicola Ventola (58)
- 2-2 Francesco Cozza (89)
- Reggina-Roma 0-2
- 0-1 Juan (51)
- 0-2 Francesco Totti (85)
- Udinese-Reggina 2-0
- 1-0 Antonio Di Natale (5)
- 2-0 Antonio Di Natale (62)
- Juventus-Reggina 4-0
- 1-0 Nicola Legrottaglie (48)
- 2-0 Hasan Salihamidžić (50)
- 3-0 David Trezeguet (75)
- 4-0 Raffaele Palladino (90 + 1)
- Reggina-Lazio 1-1
- 1-0 Francesco Cozza (8)
- 1-1 Aleksandar Kolarov (74)
- Palermo-Reggina 1-1
- 0-1 Nicola Amoruso (90 + 2)
- 1-1 Amauri (90 + 4)
- Reggina-Inter 0-1
- 0-1 Adriano (18)
- Siena-Reggina 0-0
- Reggina-Livorno 1-3
- 0-1 Nico Pulzetti (34)
- 1-1 Nicola Amoruso (37)
- 1-2 Carlos Adrián Valdez (78 og)
- 1-3 Fausto Rossini (90)
- Napoli-Reggina 1-1
- 0-1 Luca Vigiani (54)
- 1-1 Ezequiel Lavezzi (89)
- Reggina-Genoa 2-0
- 1-0 Nicola Amoruso (32)
- 2-0 Joelson (80)
- Reggina-Fiorentina 0-0
- Sampdoria-Reggina 3-0
- 1-0 Claudio Bellucci (4)
- 2-0 Paolo Sammarco (55)
- 3-0 Claudio Bellucci (76)
- Reggina-Milan 0-1
- 0-1 Alberto Gilardino (17)
- Parma-Reggina 3-0
- 1-0 Bernardo Corradi (26)
- 2-0 Andrea Pisanu (49)
- 3-0 Massimo Paci (66)
- Reggina-Catania 3-1
- 1-0 Luca Vigiani (34)
- 2-0 Luca Vigiani (78)
- 2-1 Juan Manuel Vargas (90)
- 3-1 Luca Vigiani (90 + 3)
- Empoli-Reggina 1-1
- 0-1 Fabio Ceravolo (2)
- 1-1 Luca Saudati (5 pen)
- Reggina-Cagliari 2-0
- 1-0 Franco Brienza (67)
- 2-0 Francesco Cozza (80)
- Atalanta-Reggina 2-2
- 1-0 Claudio Rivalta (19)
- 2-0 Antonio Langella (46)
- 2-1 Luca Vigiani (61)
- 2-2 Édgar Barreto (67)
- Reggina-Torino 1-3
- 0-1 Alessandro Rosina (23 pen)
- 0-2 Roberto Stellone (35)
- 1-2 Nicola Amoruso (59)
- 1-3 Alessandro Rosina (66 pen)
- Roma-Reggina 2-0
- 1-0 Christian Panucci (21)
- 2-0 Mancini (76)
- Reggina-Udinese 1-3
- 0-1 Simone Pepe (8)
- 0-2 Antonio Di Natale (63)
- 1-2 Francesco Modesto (76)
- 1-3 Antonio Di Natale (90 + 4)
- Reggina-Juventus 2-1
- 1-0 Franco Brienza (32)
- 1-1 Alessandro Del Piero (72)
- 2-1 Nicola Amoruso (90 + 4 pen)
- Lazio-Reggina 1-0
- 1-0 Rolando Bianchi (45 pen)
- Reggina-Palermo 0-0
- Inter-Reggina 2-0
- 1-0 Zlatan Ibrahimović (14 pen)
- 2-0 Nicolás Burdisso (34)
- Reggina-Siena 4-0
- 1-0 Franco Brienza (9)
- 2-0 Francesco Cozza (19)
- 3-0 Franco Brienza (39)
- 4-0 Simone Missiroli (68)
- Livorno-Reggina 1-1
- 0-1 Franco Brienza (33)
- 1-1 Erjon Bogdani (61)
- Reggina-Napoli 1-1
- 0-1 Roberto Sosa (76)
- 1-1 Franco Brienza (90 + 3)
- Genoa-Reggina 2-0
- 1-0 Marco Borriello (59)
- 2-0 Marco Rossi (90 + 2)
- Fiorentina-Reggina 2-0
- 1-0 Giampaolo Pazzini (23)
- 2-0 Adrian Mutu (90 + 2)
- Reggina-Sampdoria 1-0
- 1-0 Franco Brienza (35)
- Milan-Reggina 5-1
- 1-0 Kaká (8 pen)
- 2-0 Kaká (34)
- 2-1 Édgar Barreto (40)
- 3-1 Kaká (68)
- 4-1 Filippo Inzaghi (73)
- 5-1 Pato (89)
- Reggina-Parma 2-1
- 0-1 Luca Cigarini (25 pen)
- 1-1 Francesco Cozza (55)
- 2-1 Francesco Cozza (64)
- Catania-Reggina 1-2
- 0-1 Nicola Amoruso (41)
- 0-2 Nicola Amoruso (90 pen)
- 1-2 Jorge Martínez (90 + 2)
- Reggina-Empoli 2-0
- 1-0 Édgar Barreto (68)
- 2-0 Nicola Amoruso (79)
- Cagliari-Reggina 2-2
- 1-0 Joaquín Larrivey (18)
- 1-1 Nicola Amoruso (55)
- 2-1 Paolo Bianco (81)
- 2-2 Nicola Amoruso (86 pen)

=== Topscorers ===
- (Italy) Nicola Amoruso 12
- (Italy) Franco Brienza 7
- (Italy) Francesco Cozza 6
- (Italy) Luca Vigiani 5
- (Paraguay) Édgar Barreto 3

== Sources ==
- RSSSF - Italy 2007/08
