= China Cup =

International football tournament

- Organiser(s): Chinese Football Association
- Founded: 2017
- Region: International
- Teams: 4
- Current champions: Uruguay (2nd title)
- Most championships: Uruguay (2 titles)
- Website: www.china-cup.com.cn

The China Cup International Football Championship (Chinese: 中国杯国际足球锦标赛) was an annual association football tournament organized in China by Wanda Sports Holdings. The Championship was inaugurated in 2017 as a single-elimination tournament with four national teams, of which one was China, the host. It was planned to expand to eight teams, but the competition was never held after 2019.

== Results ==
Keys

- p: penalty shoot-out

Ed.	Year	Hosts	Final			Third place playoff or losing semi-finalists			Number of teams
Ed.	Year	Hosts	Champions	Score	Runners-up	Third place	Score	Fourth place	Number of teams
1	2017	China	Chile	1–0	Iceland	China	1–1 (4–3 p)	Croatia	4
2	2018	China	Uruguay	1–0	Wales	Czech Republic	4–1	China	4
3	2019	China	Uruguay	4–0	Thailand	Uzbekistan	1–0	China	4

Team	Winners	Runners-up	Third place	Fourth place
Uruguay	2 (2018, 2019)	—	—	—
Chile	1 (2017)	—	—	—
Iceland	—	1 (2017)	—	—
Wales	—	1 (2018)	—	—
Thailand	—	1 (2019)	—	—
China	—	—	1 (2017)	2 (2018, 2019)
Czech Republic	—	—	1 (2018)	—
Uzbekistan	—	—	1 (2019)	—
Croatia	—	—	—	1 (2017)

== All-time top goalscorers ==
Rank	Player	Team	Goals	Year(s) (goals)
1	Gareth Bale	Wales	3	2018 (3)
1	Cristhian Stuani	Uruguay	3	2019 (3)
3	Edinson Cavani	Uruguay	2	2018 (2)
3	Gastón Pereiro	Uruguay	2	2019 (2)
3	Sam Vokes	Wales	2	2018 (2)

== See also ==
- Four Nations Tournament (women's football)
- Four Nations Tournament (China)
- Yongchuan International Tournament
