= 2019 China Cup =

Tournament details
- Host country: China
- Dates: 21–25 March
- Teams: 4 (from 2 confederations)
- Venue: 1 (in 1 host city)

Final positions
- Champions: Uruguay (2nd title)
- Runners-up: Thailand
- Third place: Uzbekistan
- Fourth place: China

Tournament statistics
- Matches played: 4
- Goals scored: 9 (2.25 per match)
- Top scorer(s): (Uruguay) Cristhian Stuani (3 goals)
- Best player: (Uruguay) Cristhian Stuani

The 2019 Gree China Cup International Football Championship (Chinese: 2019 年格力中国杯国际足球锦标赛) was the third edition of the China Cup, an international football tournament held in China annually. It took place from 21 to 25 March 2019 in the city of Nanning, Guangxi.

== Participating teams ==
On 11 February 2019, it was announced that Thailand, Uruguay and Uzbekistan would participate in the 2019 China Cup.

Team	FIFA Ranking (February 2019)	LITS Ranking (January 2019)	World Football Elo Rating (March 2019)
Uruguay	7	6	11
China (host)	72	152	77
Uzbekistan	89	52	56
Thailand	115	134	119

== Venue ==
Nanning	Location of the host city of the 2019 China Cup.
Guangxi Sports Center	Location of the host city of the 2019 China Cup.
22.767°N 108.388°E	Location of the host city of the 2019 China Cup.
Capacity: 60,000	Location of the host city of the 2019 China Cup.

== Match officials ==
The following referees were chosen for the 2019 China Cup.

Referees

- (China) Ma Ning
- (Serbia) Milorad Mažić
- (Qatar) Salman Ahmad Falahi
- (Qatar) Mohammed Al-Shammari

Assistant referees

- (China) Cao Yi
- (China) Zhang Cheng
- (Qatar) Mohammad Darman
- (Qatar) Yousuf Al-Shamari

== Squads ==
- Age, caps and goals as of the start of the tournament, 21 March 2019.

=== China ===
China

Coach: (Italy) Fabio Cannavaro

No.	Pos.	Player	Date of birth (age)	Caps	Goals	Club
1	GK	Zeng Cheng	8 January 1987 (aged 32)	42	0	(Chinese Football Association) Guangzhou Evergrande Taobao
3	DF	Gao Zhunyi	21 August 1995 (aged 23)	4	0	(Chinese Football Association) Guangzhou Evergrande Taobao
4	DF	Li Lei	30 May 1992 (aged 26)	0	0	(Chinese Football Association) Beijing Guoan
5	DF	Zhang Linpeng	9 May 1989 (aged 29)	72	5	(Chinese Football Association) Guangzhou Evergrande Taobao
6	DF	Feng Xiaoting	22 October 1985 (aged 33)	75	1	(Chinese Football Association) Guangzhou Evergrande Taobao
7	FW	Wei Shihao	8 April 1995 (aged 23)	8	2	(Chinese Football Association) Guangzhou Evergrande Taobao
9	FW	Dong Xuesheng	22 May 1989 (aged 29)	3	0	(Chinese Football Association) Hebei China Fortune
11	MF	Hao Junmin	24 March 1987 (aged 31)	72	12	(Chinese Football Association) Shandong Luneng Taishan
12	GK	Yan Junling	28 January 1991 (aged 28)	22	0	(Chinese Football Association) Shanghai SIPG
13	MF	He Chao	19 April 1995 (aged 23)	5	0	(Chinese Football Association) Guangzhou Evergrande Taobao
14	MF	Zhang Xiuwei	13 March 1996 (aged 23)	1	0	(Chinese Football Association) Guangzhou Evergrande Taobao
15	MF	Wu Xi	19 February 1989 (aged 30)	60	4	(Chinese Football Association) Jiangsu Suning
16	MF	Zhang Xizhe	23 January 1991 (aged 28)	23	4	(Chinese Football Association) Beijing Guoan
17	DF	Wang Gang	17 February 1989 (aged 30)	0	0	(Chinese Football Association) Beijing Sinobo Guoan
19	FW	Xie Pengfei	29 June 1993 (aged 25)	0	0	(Chinese Football Association) Jiangsu Suning
21	FW	Tan Long	1 April 1988 (aged 30)	1	0	(Chinese Football Association) Changchun Yatai
23	GK	Wang Dalei	10 January 1989 (aged 30)	26	0	(Chinese Football Association) Shandong Luneng Taishan
24	DF	Fu Huan	12 July 1993 (aged 25)	4	0	(Chinese Football Association) Shanghai SIPG
25	FW	Lü Wenjun	11 March 1989 (aged 30)	0	0	(Chinese Football Association) Shanghai SIPG
26	DF	Li Ang	15 September 1993 (aged 25)	2	0	(Chinese Football Association) Jiangsu Suning
27	MF	Wang Yongpo	19 January 1987 (aged 32)	16	8	(Chinese Football Association) Tianjin Tianhai
28	DF	Liu Yang	17 June 1995 (aged 23)	7	0	(Chinese Football Association) Shandong Luneng Taishan
30	MF	Peng Xinli	22 July 1991 (aged 27)	1	0	(Chinese Football Association) Chongqing Lifan
	DF	Liu Yiming	28 February 1995 (aged 24)	13	0	(Chinese Football Association) Guangzhou Evergrande Taobao

=== Thailand ===
Thailand

Coach: (Thailand) Sirisak Yodyardthai (caretaker)

No.	Pos.	Player	Date of birth (age)	Caps	Goals	Club
2	DF	Peerapat Notchaiya	4 February 1993 (aged 26)	29	1	(Football Association of Thailand) Bangkok United
3	DF	Theerathon Bunmathan (captain)	6 February 1990 (aged 29)	57	5	(Japan Football Association) Yokohama F. Marinos
4	MF	Sarach Yooyen	30 May 1992 (aged 26)	37	0	(Football Association of Thailand) Muangthong United
5	DF	Adisorn Promrak	21 October 1993 (aged 25)	28	0	(Football Association of Thailand) Muangthong United
6	DF	Pansa Hemviboon	8 July 1990 (aged 28)	18	4	(Football Association of Thailand) Buriram United
8	MF	Thitiphan Puangchan	1 September 1993 (aged 25)	29	6	(Japan Football Association) Oita Trinita
9	FW	Adisak Kraisorn	1 February 1991 (aged 28)	36	16	(Football Association of Thailand) Muangthong United
10	FW	Chananan Pombuppha	17 March 1992 (aged 27)	9	0	(Football Association of Thailand) Suphanburi
11	MF	Chitpanya Tisud	8 February 1991 (aged 28)	0	0	(Football Association of Thailand) PT Prachuap
12	MF	Kroekrit Thaweekarn	19 November 1990 (aged 28)	32	7	(Football Association of Thailand) Chonburi
13	MF	Picha Autra	7 January 1996 (aged 23)	0	0	(Football Association of Thailand) Samut Prakan City
14	MF	Sanukran Thinjom	12 September 1993 (aged 25)	0	0	(Football Association of Thailand) Muangthong United
15	DF	Narubadin Weerawatnodom	12 July 1994 (aged 24)	25	0	(Football Association of Thailand) Buriram United
17	MF	Tanaboon Kesarat	21 September 1993 (aged 25)	43	1	(Football Association of Thailand) BG Pathum United
18	MF	Chanathip Songkrasin (vice-captain)	5 October 1993 (aged 25)	51	7	(Japan Football Association) Hokkaido Consadole Sapporo
19	DF	Tristan Do	31 January 1993 (aged 26)	29	0	(Football Association of Thailand) Bangkok United
20	GK	Chatchai Budprom	4 February 1987 (aged 32)	8	0	(Football Association of Thailand) BG Pathum United
21	MF	Sivakorn Tiatrakul	7 July 1994 (aged 24)	1	0	(Football Association of Thailand) Chiangrai United
22	MF	Peeradon Chamratsamee	15 September 1992 (aged 26)	2	0	(Football Association of Thailand) Samut Prakan City
23	GK	Siwarak Tedsungnoen (3rd-captain)	20 April 1984 (aged 34)	17	0	(Football Association of Thailand) Buriram United
26	DF	Suphan Thongsong	26 August 1994 (aged 24)	5	0	(Football Association of Thailand) Suphanburi
27	DF	Nattapon Malapun	10 January 1994 (aged 25)	2	0	(Football Association of Thailand) PT Prachuap
36	GK	Worawut Srisupha	25 May 1992 (aged 26)	0	0	(Football Association of Thailand) Port

=== Uruguay ===
Uruguay

Coach: (Uruguay) Óscar Tabárez

No.	Pos.	Player	Date of birth (age)	Caps	Goals	Club
1	GK	Fernando Muslera	16 June 1986 (aged 32)	105	0	(Turkish Football Federation) Galatasaray
2	DF	José Giménez	20 January 1995 (aged 24)	47	7	(Royal Spanish Football Federation) Atlético Madrid
3	DF	Diego Godín (captain)	16 February 1986 (aged 33)	125	8	(Royal Spanish Football Federation) Atlético Madrid
4	DF	Giovanni González	20 September 1994 (aged 24)	0	0	(Uruguayan Football Association) Peñarol
5	MF	Matías Vecino	24 August 1991 (aged 27)	31	2	(Italian Football Federation) Internazionale
6	MF	Rodrigo Bentancur	25 June 1997 (aged 21)	17	0	(Italian Football Federation) Juventus
7	MF	Nicolás Lodeiro	21 March 1989 (aged 30)	54	4	(United States Soccer Federation) Seattle Sounders FC
8	MF	Nahitan Nández	28 December 1995 (aged 23)	20	0	(Argentine Football Association) Boca Juniors
10	MF	Giorgian De Arrascaeta	1 June 1994 (aged 24)	18	2	(Brazilian Football Confederation) Flamengo
11	FW	Cristhian Stuani	12 October 1986 (aged 32)	46	5	(Royal Spanish Football Federation) Girona
12	GK	Martín Campaña	29 May 1989 (aged 29)	3	0	(Argentine Football Association) Independiente
13	DF	Mathías Suárez	24 June 1996 (aged 22)	2	0	(French Football Federation) Montpellier
14	MF	Lucas Torreira	11 February 1996 (aged 23)	13	0	(The Football Association) Arsenal
15	MF	Federico Valverde	22 July 1998 (aged 20)	8	1	(Royal Spanish Football Federation) Real Madrid
16	MF	Gastón Pereiro	11 June 1995 (aged 23)	5	2	(Royal Dutch Football Association) PSV Eindhoven
17	DF	Diego Laxalt	7 February 1993 (aged 26)	15	0	(Italian Football Federation) Milan
18	FW	Maxi Gómez	14 August 1996 (aged 22)	9	0	(Royal Spanish Football Federation) Celta Vigo
19	DF	Sebastián Coates	7 October 1990 (aged 28)	33	1	(Portuguese Football Federation) Sporting CP
20	MF	Jonathan Rodríguez	6 July 1993 (aged 25)	12	2	(Mexican Football Federation) Cruz Azul
21	DF	Marcelo Saracchi	23 April 1998 (aged 20)	2	0	(German Football Association) RB Leipzig
22	DF	Martín Cáceres	7 April 1987 (aged 31)	86	4	(Italian Football Federation) Juventus
23	GK	Martín Silva	25 March 1983 (aged 35)	11	0	(Paraguayan Football Association) Libertad

=== Uzbekistan ===
Uzbekistan

Coach: (Argentina) Héctor Cúper

No.	Pos.	Player	Date of birth (age)	Caps	Goals	Club
1	GK	Ignatiy Nesterov (vice-captain)	20 June 1983 (aged 35)	106	0	(Saudi Arabian Football Federation) Ohod
2	DF	Akmal Shorakhmedov	10 May 1986 (aged 32)	33	0	(Uzbekistan Football Association) AGMK
3	DF	Dostonbek Tursunov	13 June 1995 (aged 23)	3	0	(Japan Football Association) Renofa Yamaguchi
4	DF	Farrukh Sayfiyev	17 January 1991 (aged 28)	17	0	(Uzbekistan Football Association) Pakhtakor Tashkent
5	DF	Anzur Ismailov (vice-captain)	21 April 1985 (aged 33)	95	3	(Uzbekistan Football Association) Lokomotiv Tashkent
6	DF	Davron Hashimov	24 November 1992 (aged 26)	21	0	(Uzbekistan Football Association) Lokomotiv Tashkent
7	FW	Sardor Rashidov	14 June 1991 (aged 27)	47	13	(Portuguese Football Federation) Nacional
8	MF	Ikromjon Alibaev	9 January 1994 (aged 25)	13	0	(Korea Football Association) FC Seoul
9	MF	Odil Ahmedov (captain)	25 November 1987 (aged 31)	93	17	(Chinese Football Association) Shanghai SIPG
10	FW	Marat Bikmaev	1 January 1986 (aged 33)	54	9	(Uzbekistan Football Association) Pakhtakor Tashkent
11	MF	Jaloliddin Masharipov	1 September 1993 (aged 25)	17	2	(Uzbekistan Football Association) Pakhtakor Tashkent
12	GK	Sanjar Quvvatov	8 January 1990 (aged 29)	0	0	(Uzbekistan Football Association) Pakhtakor Tashkent
13	DF	Oleg Zoteev	5 July 1989 (aged 29)	20	1	(Uzbekistan Football Association) Lokomotiv Tashkent
14	FW	Eldor Shomurodov	29 June 1995 (aged 23)	32	10	(Russian Football Union) Rostov
15	DF	Egor Krimets	27 January 1992 (aged 27)	33	2	(Uzbekistan Football Association) Pakhtakor Tashkent
16	MF	Azizbek Turgunboev	1 October 1994 (aged 24)	6	0	(Uzbekistan Football Association) Navbahor Namangan
17	MF	Dostonbek Khamdamov	24 July 1996 (aged 22)	11	0	(Uzbekistan Football Association) Pakhtakor Tashkent
18	MF	Fozil Musaev	2 January 1989 (aged 30)	24	0	(Japan Football Association) Júbilo Iwata
19	MF	Otabek Shukurov	22 June 1996 (aged 22)	25	2	(United Arab Emirates Football Association) Al-Sharjah
20	DF	Islom Tukhtakhodjaev	30 October 1989 (aged 29)	62	1	(Uzbekistan Football Association) Lokomotiv Tashkent
21	GK	Utkir Yusupov	4 January 1991 (aged 28)	1	0	(Uzbekistan Football Association) Navbahor Namangan
22	MF	Javokhir Sidikov	8 December 1996 (aged 22)	11	1	(Uzbekistan Football Association) Kokand 1912
23	MF	Odiljon Hamrobekov	13 February 1996 (aged 23)	9	0	(Uzbekistan Football Association) Pakhtakor Tashkent

== Matches ==
All times are local, CST (UTC+8).

=== Bracket ===
Semi-finals
21 March – Nanning
China	0
Thailand	1
22 March – Nanning
Uzbekistan	0
Uruguay	3

Final
25 March – Nanning
Thailand	0
Uruguay	4
Third-place playoff
25 March – Nanning
China	0
Uzbekistan	1

=== Semi-finals ===
21 March 2019
20:00

China	0–1	Thailand
	Report	Chanathip 33'

Guangxi Sports Center, Nanning
Referee: Salman Ahmad Falahi (Qatar)
22 March 2019
19:35

Uzbekistan	0–3	Uruguay
	Report	Pereiro 5'; Stuani 23', 82'

Guangxi Sports Center, Nanning
Referee: Milorad Mažić (Serbia)

=== Third-place playoff ===
25 March 2019
15:30

China	0–1	Uzbekistan
	Report	Shomurodov 34'

Guangxi Sports Center, Nanning
Attendance: 10,391
Referee: Mohammed Al-Shammari (Qatar)

=== Final ===
25 March 2019
19:35

Thailand	0–4	Uruguay
	Report	Vecino 6'; Pereiro 38'; Stuani 58'; Gómez 88'

Guangxi Sports Center, Nanning
Referee: Ma Ning (China PR)

== Goalscorers ==
There were 9 goals scored in 4 matches, for an average of 2.25 goals per match.

3 goals

- (Uruguay) Cristhian Stuani

2 goals

- (Uruguay) Gastón Pereiro

1 goal

- (Thailand) Chanathip Songkrasin
- (Uzbekistan) Eldor Shomurodov
- (Uruguay) Matías Vecino
- (Uruguay) Maxi Gómez
