= 2004 Campeonato Uruguayo Primera División =

101st season of the top-tier football league in Uruguay

The 2004 Uruguayan Primera Division was the 100th season of top-tier football in Uruguay.

== Overview ==
It was contested by 18 teams. In the first half of the year a qualification tournament was played, with the top 10 teams qualifying to the second stage; where the Apertura and Clausura tournaments would be played in the second half of the year, each with nine games. The winner of the Apertura and Clausura tournaments would qualify to the finals.

Danubio won the championship for the second time in its history. With the title, they earned a spot in the 2005 Copa Libertadores.

== Torneo Clasificatorio ==
Pos	Team	Pld	W	D	L	GF	GA	GD	Pts
1	Danubio	17	12	5	0	32	11	+21	41
2	Cerrito	17	10	3	4	25	17	+8	33
3	Peñarol	17	9	5	3	34	17	+17	32
4	Nacional	17	8	5	4	26	15	+11	29
5	Liverpool	17	8	5	4	24	19	+5	29
6	Rentistas	17	6	7	4	23	18	+5	25
7	Montevideo Wanderers	17	7	4	6	15	18	−3	25
8	Fénix	17	6	6	5	27	21	+6	24
9	Defensor Sporting	17	5	7	5	22	24	−2	22
10	Cerro	17	7	1	9	21	26	−5	22
11	Miramar Misiones	17	5	6	6	24	25	−1	21
12	Plaza Colonia	17	3	9	5	29	32	−3	18
13	Deportivo Colonia	17	3	9	5	19	24	−5	18
14	Rocha	17	3	8	6	22	33	−11	17
15	Bella Vista	17	4	4	9	15	26	−11	16
16	Tacuarembó	17	3	4	10	18	28	−10	13
17	Central Español	17	2	6	9	14	25	−11	12
18	Deportivo Maldonado	17	1	8	8	12	23	−11	11

Source: rsssf.com

== Championship ==
=== Apertura ===
Pos	Team	Pld	W	D	L	GF	GA	GD	Pts
1	Nacional	9	6	3	0	17	6	+11	21
2	Defensor Sporting	9	6	2	1	18	7	+11	20
3	Danubio	9	5	3	1	11	5	+6	18
4	Liverpool	9	3	4	2	13	15	−2	13
5	Peñarol	9	3	3	3	16	14	+2	12
6	Rentistas	9	3	2	4	13	13	0	11
7	Plaza Colonia	9	1	4	4	8	12	−4	7
8	Cerrito	9	2	1	6	8	14	−6	7
9	Montevideo Wanderers	9	1	4	4	7	13	−6	7
10	Fénix	9	0	4	5	7	19	−12	4

Source: rsssf.com

=== Clausura ===
Pos	Team	Pld	W	D	L	GF	GA	GD	Pts
1	Danubio	9	7	1	1	17	6	+11	22
2	Defensor Sporting	9	5	4	0	10	4	+6	19
3	Nacional	9	4	3	2	18	12	+6	15
4	Liverpool	9	5	0	4	17	12	+5	15
5	Peñarol	9	4	2	3	16	18	−2	14
6	Rentistas	9	2	4	3	8	17	−9	10
7	Fénix	9	2	3	4	16	16	0	9
8	Montevideo Wanderers	9	2	3	4	6	9	−3	9
9	Cerrito	9	2	2	5	11	16	−5	8
10	Plaza Colonia	9	0	2	7	7	16	−9	2

Source: rsssf.com

== Championship playoff ==
Nacional and Danubio qualified to the championship playoffs as the Apertura and Clausura winners respectively

=== First leg ===
12 December 2004
L1

Nacional	4 – 1	Danubio
Ligüera 32'; Méndez 41', 45'; Coelho 85'		Risso 26'

Estadio Centenario, Montevideo
Attendance: 60,000
Referee: Fernando Cabrera (URU)

=== Second leg ===
15 December 2004
L2

Danubio	1 – 0	Nacional
Perrone 90+3'

Jardines Del Hipódromo, Montevideo
Attendance: 12,000
Referee: Roberto Silvera (URU)

Despite losing 4-2 on aggregate, Danubio became champions by winning the second leg, the Clausura, and the annual table.

== Relegation group ==
Pos	Team	Pld	W	D	L	GF	GA	GD	Pts
11	Tacuarembó	31	12	7	12	42	39	+3	43
12	Miramar Misiones	31	9	12	10	47	51	−4	39
13	Deportivo Colonia	31	7	16	8	38	44	−6	37
14	Rocha	31	8	11	12	41	51	−10	35
15	Cerro	31	9	7	15	36	46	−10	34
16	Central Español	31	7	12	12	30	36	−6	33
17	Bella Vista	31	7	8	16	33	51	−18	29
18	Deportivo Maldonado	31	5	13	13	34	48	−14	28

Source: rsssf.com
