= Luca Vigiani =

Italian footballer and coach

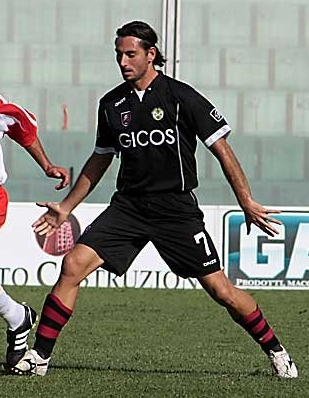

Personal information
- Date of birth: 25 August 1976 (age 50)
- Place of birth: Florence, Italy
- Height: 1.82 m (5 ft 11 1/2 in)
- Position: Midfielder

Team information
- Current team: Bologna (U19 coach)

Youth career
- Fiorentina

Senior career*
Years	Team	Apps	(Gls)
1994–1996	Fiorentina	1	(0)
1996–1997	Fiorenzuola	1	(0)
1997–1998	Saronno	22	(1)
1998–2001	Cisco Roma	70	(2)
2001–2003	Pistoiese	37	(4)
2003–2007	Livorno	90	(6)
2005–2006	→ Reggina (loan)	36	(0)
2007–2009	Reggina	34	(7)
2009–2010	Bologna F.C. 1909	11	(0)
2010–2011	Reggina	19	(1)
2010–2011	→ Carrarese (loan)		

International career
1992	Italy U-16	2	(0)
1993	Italy U-17	3	(0)

Managerial career
- 2019–2021: Bologna (U17)
- 2021–: Bologna (U19)
- 2022: Bologna (interim)
- * Club domestic league appearances and goals

Luca Vigiani (born 25 August 1976) is an Italian football coach and a former midfielder. He is the head coach of the Under-19 (Primavera) squad of Bologna.

== Coaching career ==
He was a coach at Watford under manager Walter Mazzarri, having previously coached under him at Inter Milan and Napoli.

In July 2021, he was appointed head coach of the Under-19 squad of Bologna.
