= Uzbekistan national football team =

Men's association football team

Uzbekistan
- Nickname(s): Oq boʻrilar (White Wolves); Turanians
- Association: Uzbekistan Football Association (UFA)
- Confederation: AFC (Asia)
- Sub-confederation: CAFA (Central Asia)
- Head coach: Fabio Cannavaro
- Captain: Eldor Shomurodov
- Most caps: Server Djeparov (128)
- Top scorer: Eldor Shomurodov (47)
- Home stadium: Bunyodkor Stadium; Pakhtakor Stadium; Olympic City Stadium
- FIFA code: UZB
First colours	Second colours

FIFA ranking
- Current: 59 ▲1 (7 October 2026)
- Highest: 45 (November 2006 – January 2007)
- Lowest: 118 (November 1996)

First international
- Tajikistan 2–2 Uzbekistan (Dushanbe, Tajikistan; 17 June 1992)

Biggest win
- Uzbekistan 15–0 Mongolia (Chiang Mai, Thailand; 5 December 1998)

Biggest defeat
- Japan 8–1 Uzbekistan (Sidon, Lebanon; 17 October 2000)

World Cup
- Appearances: 1 (first in 2026)
- Best result: Group stage (2026)

Asian Cup
- Appearances: 9 (first in 1996)
- Best result: Fourth place (2011)

CAFA Nations Cup
- Appearances: 2 (first in 2023)
- Best result: Champions (2025)
Medal record
Asian Games
Gold medal – first place	1994 Hiroshima	Team
Afro-Asian Cup of Nations
Silver medal – second place	1995	Team
CAFA Nations Cup
Gold medal – first place	2025	Team
Silver medal – second place	2023	Team

The Uzbekistan national football team (Uzbek: Oʻzbekiston milliy futbol terma jamoasi, Ўзбекистон миллий футбол терма жамоаси) represents Uzbekistan in men's international football and is controlled by the Uzbekistan Football Association, the governing body for football in Uzbekistan.

Uzbekistan holds the highest competitive results among teams from Central Asia. At the 2011 Asian Cup, Uzbekistan reached the semi-finals of the tournament for the first time. At other competitions such as the Asian Games, Uzbekistan won the gold medal in 1994 in Japan, while finishing as the runners-up at the Afro-Asian Cup of Nations in 1995. They qualified for the FIFA World Cup for the first time in 2026, becoming the first Central Asian country and the third post-Soviet state after Russia and Ukraine to qualify for the tournament.

== History ==
=== Early history ===
Since 1992, Uzbekistan gained independence and a new Uzbek national team was organized. The national team held its first match in 1992, a game against Tajikistan, in the framework of the 1992 Central Asian Cup (the tournament was held once, initiated by FIFA). In 1992, Uzbekistan was also a member of the CIS national football team and instead participated in Euro 1992. The Uzbek national team did not play the following year.

Most of the republics became members of UEFA (Russia, Ukraine, Belarus, Moldova, Latvia, Lithuania, Estonia, Georgia, Armenia and Azerbaijan). While Uzbekistan also wanted to become a member of UEFA, the rest of Central Asia (Kazakhstan, Kyrgyzstan, Tajikistan and Turkmenistan), chose the Asian Football Confederation. In 2002, Kazakhstan became a member of UEFA for football development, but Uzbekistan chose to remain in the AFC.

In 1994, the Uzbekistan Football Federation was officially adopted by the AFC and FIFA. In the same year Uzbekistan won the Uzbekistan Independence Cup.

=== 1990s ===

1994 Asian Games Final starting lineup on 16 October 1994, in Hiroshima (Japan)

In the 1994 Asian Games, Uzbekistan were grouped with powerhouse Saudi Arabia, Thailand and Malaysia, alongside Hong Kong. After a 4–1 victory over the Saudis, Uzbekistan followed up with a 5–0 victory over Malaysia and a 1–0 win over Hong Kong before winning the group with a 5–4 win against Thailand. In the quarter-finals, Uzbekistan defeated Turkmenistan 3–0 to advance to the semi-finals where they faced South Korea. The Korean side included nine players that had already participated in the 1994 FIFA World Cup; despite this, Uzbekistan shocked South Korea with a 1–0 victory to advance to the final, its first ever final since gaining independence. In their final game against China, Uzbekistan defeated the Chinese 4–2 to capture its first and only Asian honor two years after its creation.

In the 1996 AFC Asian Cup, Uzbekistan was grouped with Japan, China and Syria, and were eliminated in the group stage. Uzbekistan's first-ever attempt to qualify for the World Cup was in 1998. Grouped with Yemen, Cambodia and Indonesia in the first stage, Uzbekistan won every match except for the away fixture against Indonesia. Shortly after, the Uzbeks played South Korea, Japan and the UAE, and failed to qualify for the tournament.

=== 2000s ===
The 2000 AFC Asian Cup saw the Uzbeks with Japan, Saudi Arabia and Qatar, gaining only a point against the latter with a draw. Uzbekistan participated in the first round in order to qualify for the 2002 FIFA World Cup in Japan and South Korea, and eventually made the second round. The group contained China, the UAE, Oman and Qatar, and the Uzbeks were unable to make any major breakthrough in the second round, losing twice to the UAE, and suffering two away defeats to China and Oman. An away draw to Qatar confirmed Uzbekistan's failure to qualify, despite a late win over already qualified China in the final match.

Uzbekistan failed to make further impact on the continental stage until they reached the last eight of the 2004 Asian Cup, topping their group after winning all matches, where they were beaten by Bahrain after a penalty shoot-out. The country would eventually defeat Iraq in the second qualifying round for the 2006 World Cup in Germany, with goals from Maksim Shatskikh and Alexander Geynrikh sending them through to the last eight. They were knocked out in the final stage of the Asian qualification to the 2006 World Cup after losing on the away goals rule to Bahrain. The result was subject to controversy as three games were played; the first, a 1–0 win for Uzbekistan was wiped out after FIFA declared the result void after a mistake by Toshimitsu Yoshida, a Japanese referee. The replay ended 1–1, and after the return finished 0–0, Uzbekistan were eliminated.

In the 2007 AFC Asian Cup, Uzbekistan advanced from the group stage by beating Malaysia 5–0 and China PR 3–0. However, Uzbekistan was knocked out of the tournament in the quarter-finals by losing to Saudi Arabia 2–1.

=== 2010s ===
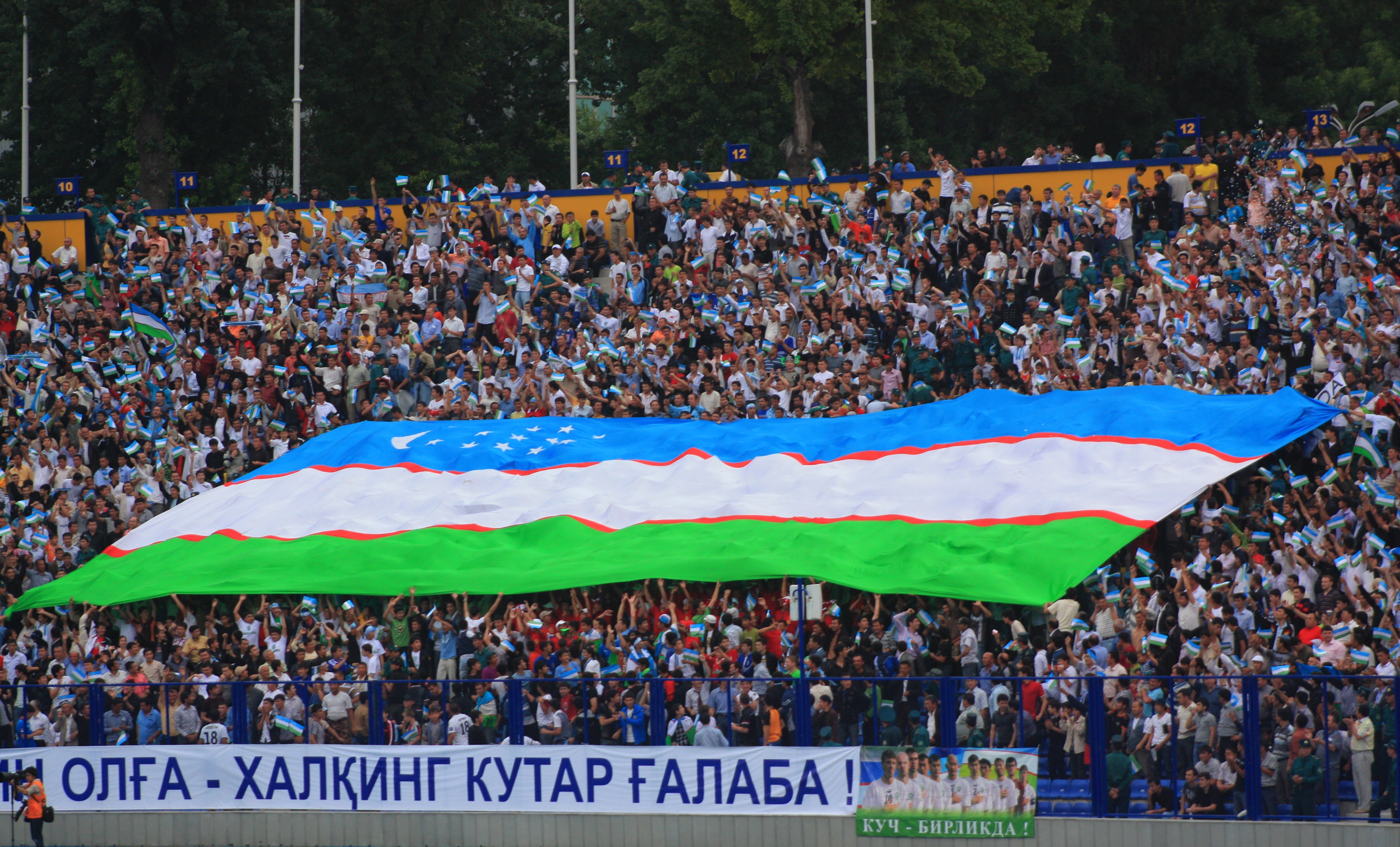
Uzbekistan national team supporters during a qualification match for the 2010 World Cup against Japan at Pakhtakor Stadium in Tashkent

After having three foreign coaches (German Hans-Jürgen Gede, Englishman Bob Houghton and Russian Valeri Nepomniachi) in three years, the country turned to former Uzbekistan Olympic team coach Rauf Inileev. During qualification for the 2010 World Cup, Uzbekistan advanced to the fourth round of the Asian qualifiers after winning their first four matches, but finished last in Group A of the final round behind favorites Australia, Japan, Bahrain and Qatar, with four points from eight matches.

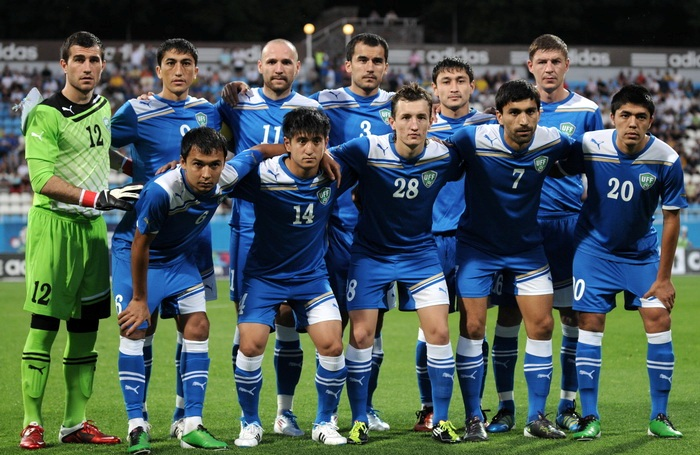
Uzbekistan at the 2011 AFC Asian Cup

In the 2011 AFC Asian Cup, Uzbekistan ended in fourth place, their all-time best result in the tournament. After getting past the group stage and quarter-finals, the Uzbek team lost their first opportunity to reach the Asian Cup final when Australia thrashed them 6–0 in the semi-final game. Several days later, they were defeated again by South Korea in the third place match 3–2.

In qualification for the 2014 FIFA World Cup, Uzbekistan advanced to Asia's fourth round after winning their group in the third round over Japan. Uzbekistan finished with 16 points (five wins and one draw), more than any other team in the third round, including an impressive 1–0 away win against Japan. In the fourth round, Uzbekistan finished third in Group A behind Iran and South Korea, and lost to South Korea (14 points) on goal difference, and would eventually play Jordan in the fifth round to determine the AFC participant in the intercontinental play-off. On 10 September 2013, with the two teams drawn at the end of the second leg, Jordan eventually progressed to the intercontinental play-off after winning 9–8 on penalties.

In the 2015 Asian Cup, Uzbekistan advanced to the quarter-finals after finishing as runners-up in Group B, won by China. The team was knocked out of the tournament in the quarter-finals after losing 2–0 in extra time to South Korea.

Uzbekistan continued their quest to head to the World Cup during 2018 FIFA World Cup qualification, but their campaign had been shattered with a 4–2 defeat to North Korea. However, the Uzbeks soon bounced back and won the last remaining matches to top the group and qualified to the 2019 AFC Asian Cup as well as the last round. Once again, Uzbekistan in the last round, missed an opportunity when they finished fourth, behind Iran, South Korea and Syria, when Uzbekistan could only manage a 0–0 draw to the South Koreans in the last match.

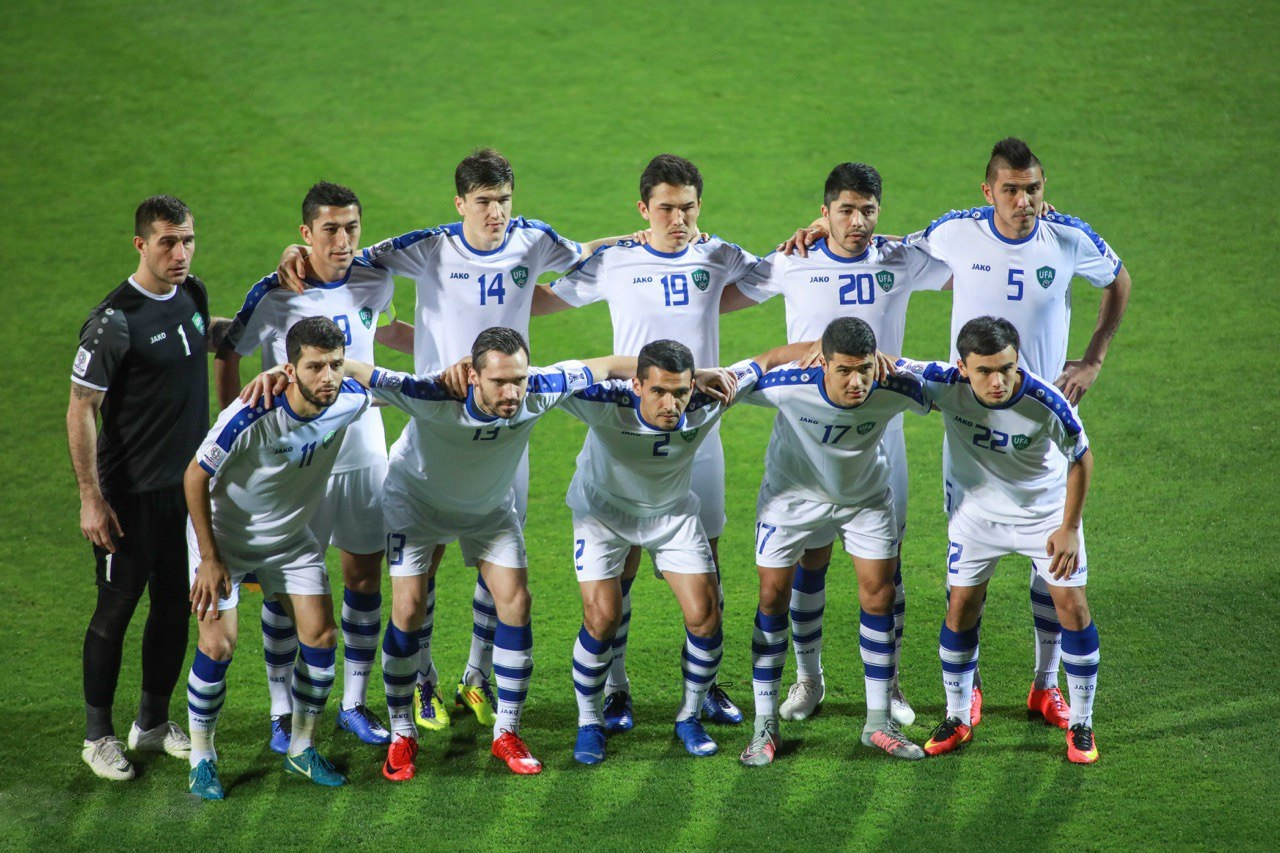
Uzbekistan at the 2019 AFC Asian Cup

Uzbekistan started their 2019 AFC Asian Cup campaign with a 2–1 victory over Oman and continued with a 4–0 win over Turkmenistan, which guaranteed Uzbekistan to progress from the group stage for the fifth consecutive time, despite ending with a 1–2 defeat to Japan in the last match. Facing Australia, defending Asian champions, Uzbekistan drew 0–0 after 120 minutes. In the penalty shootout, Australia prevailed with a 4–2 win.

=== 2020s ===
Uzbekistan national football team with President of Uzbekistan after World Cup qualifying match against Qatar on 10 June 2025

In the second qualifying round for the 2022 FIFA World Cup, Uzbekistan suffered another disappointment by failing to qualify for the final round. The White Wolves accumulated five wins and three defeats. Moreover, Uzbekistan's failure was also compounded by the fact that North Korea, originally in Group H of the same round, surprisingly withdrew due to the COVID-19 pandemic, in which FIFA and the AFC then ruled North Korea's results as null and void. This caused Lebanon to qualify ahead of Uzbekistan, since Lebanon's original results against North Korea were a draw and a loss.

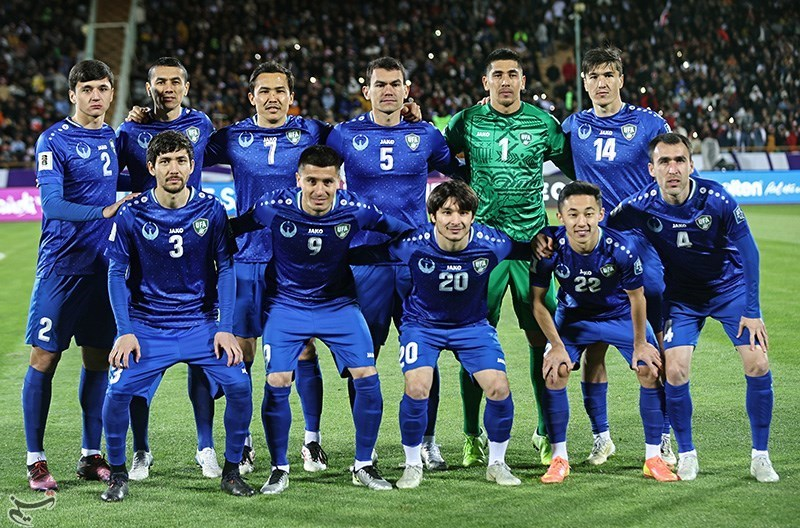
Uzbekistan squad against Iran at the third round of the 2026 FIFA World Cup qualification.

Uzbekistan took part in the third qualifying round for the 2023 AFC Asian Cup. Designated as the host country of Group C (due to the COVID-19 pandemic in Asia), the Central Asians won all three games and finished top of their group without conceding a goal, confirming their qualification for the tournament. Uzbekistan was placed in Group B with Australia, Syria and India. Prior to the tournament, Uzbek all-time top goalscorer Eldor Shomurodov sustained a leg injury, ruling him out of the squad. Uzbekistan drew 0–0 in their opening game against Syria and won against India 3–0. In their last match against Australia, Uzbekistan drew 1–1 to seal a place in the round of 16 as the second-placed team in their group. They faced Thailand, whom they managed to beat 2–1. In the quarter-finals, they faced hosts Qatar. With the match drawn 1–1 after extra time, Uzbekistan lost 3–2 in the penalty shoot-out.

Uzbekistan were unbeaten throughout their entire second qualifying round for the 2026 FIFA World Cup, winning four matches and drawing two, and entered the third qualifying round as second place in the group. In the third round, the team qualified for the World Cup for the first time in history, with one match to spare after an away goalless draw with the United Arab Emirates. This makes Uzbekistan the first Central Asian nation, as well as the third former republic after Russia and Ukraine, to qualify for the World Cup.

Uzbekistan entered the 2025 CAFA Nations Cup, where the team won the title after a draw against Oman and victories over Turkmenistan, Kyrgyzstan and a last-minute extra-time victory over Iran 1–0 in the final.

== Team image ==
=== Nicknames ===
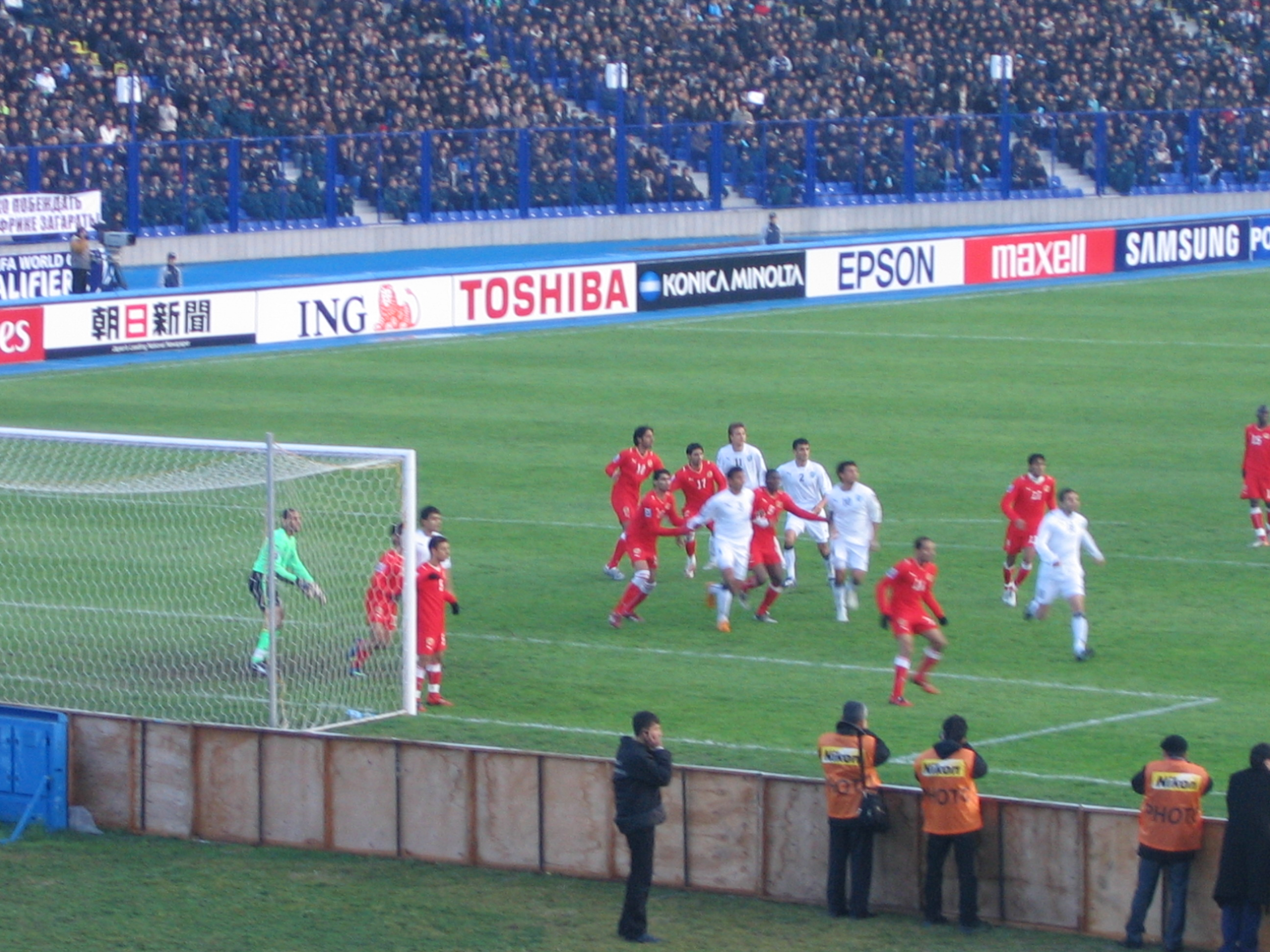
Uzbekistan vs. Bahrain at Pakhtakor Central Stadium in 2009

The Uzbekistan national team has received several nicknames by supporters and media. The most common one used is "The White Wolves" (Uzbek: Oq boʻrilar / Оқ бўрилар), while also being called "Asian Italy" (Uzbek: Osiyo Italiyasi / Осиё Италияси) due to the similarity of colors (white and blue) of Italy and Uzbekistan, as well as similar tactics (defensive football) of these teams.

Uzbekistan is also called the "Huma birds" (Uzbek: Humo qushlari / Ҳумо қушлари); the mythical Huma bird is the national bird of Uzbekistan, and is depicted on the state emblem of Uzbekistan. The Huma bird is depicted on the emblem of the National Olympic Committee of the Republic of Uzbekistan. Another nickname is the "Turanians" (Uzbek: Turonliklar / Туронликлар), as Uzbekistan is located in the center of the ancient region of Turan.

=== Rivalries ===
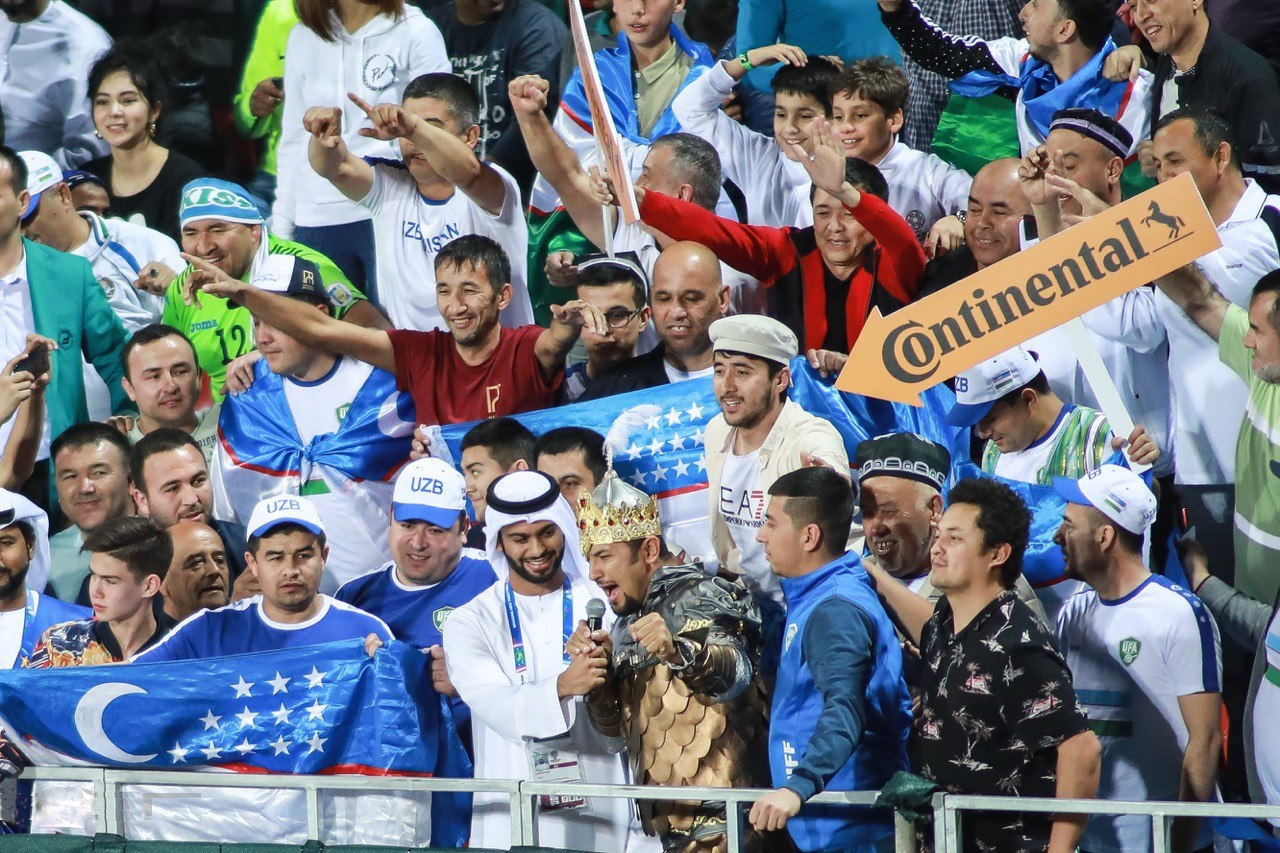
Uzbekistani fans at the 2019 Asian Cup in UAE

Kazakhstan national team is considered to be the main rival of the Uzbekistan national team. This rivalry dates back to the time of the Soviet Union, when both countries were part of the 15 republics that made up the Union. The rivalry between Uzbekistan and Kazakhstan was evident at all levels, from grandiose construction projects to football. The two countries' top football clubs, Pakhtakor Tashkent and Kairat Almaty, competed for the title of the strongest club in Central Asia. In the 1990s, both countries were part of the AFC, and Uzbekistan performed better than Kazakhstan. In 2002, Kazakhstan joined the UEFA, and the intensity of the rivalry decreased as the national teams and clubs primarily played friendly matches. However, fans and the football community in Uzbekistan and Kazakhstan continue to compare their national teams and clubs. Objectively, Uzbekistan has surpassed Kazakhstan in terms of football development, becoming the main football country in the region. During the Soviet era, Uzbekistan's national team also had some rivalry with Ukraine and Georgia.

In addition to Kazakhstan, Uzbekistan competes with the national team of Tajikistan from the Central Asian countries, as well as to a lesser extent with the national teams of Turkmenistan and Kyrgyzstan. Over the past 15 years, rivalry with the Iran national team has become especially important, and the Iran national team can be considered Uzbekistan's second main rival. The matches against South Korea, Saudi Arabia, Qatar and the UAE are also of great importance.

=== Kit sponsorship ===
In qualifying tournaments, the team usually wears a normal plain jersey of the kit sponsor and only has the logo of the Uzbekistan Football Association printed on it.

Supplier	Period
(Germany) Adidas	1992–1997
(United Kingdom) Admiral	1998
(Thailand) Grand Sport	1999
(Germany) Adidas	2000
(Denmark) Hummel	2001–2002
(United Kingdom) Umbro	2003
(Germany) Puma	2004–2012
(Spain) Joma	2013–2017
(Germany) Adidas	2018
(Germany) Jako	2019–2025
(Uzbekistan) 7SABER	2025–present

== Home stadium ==
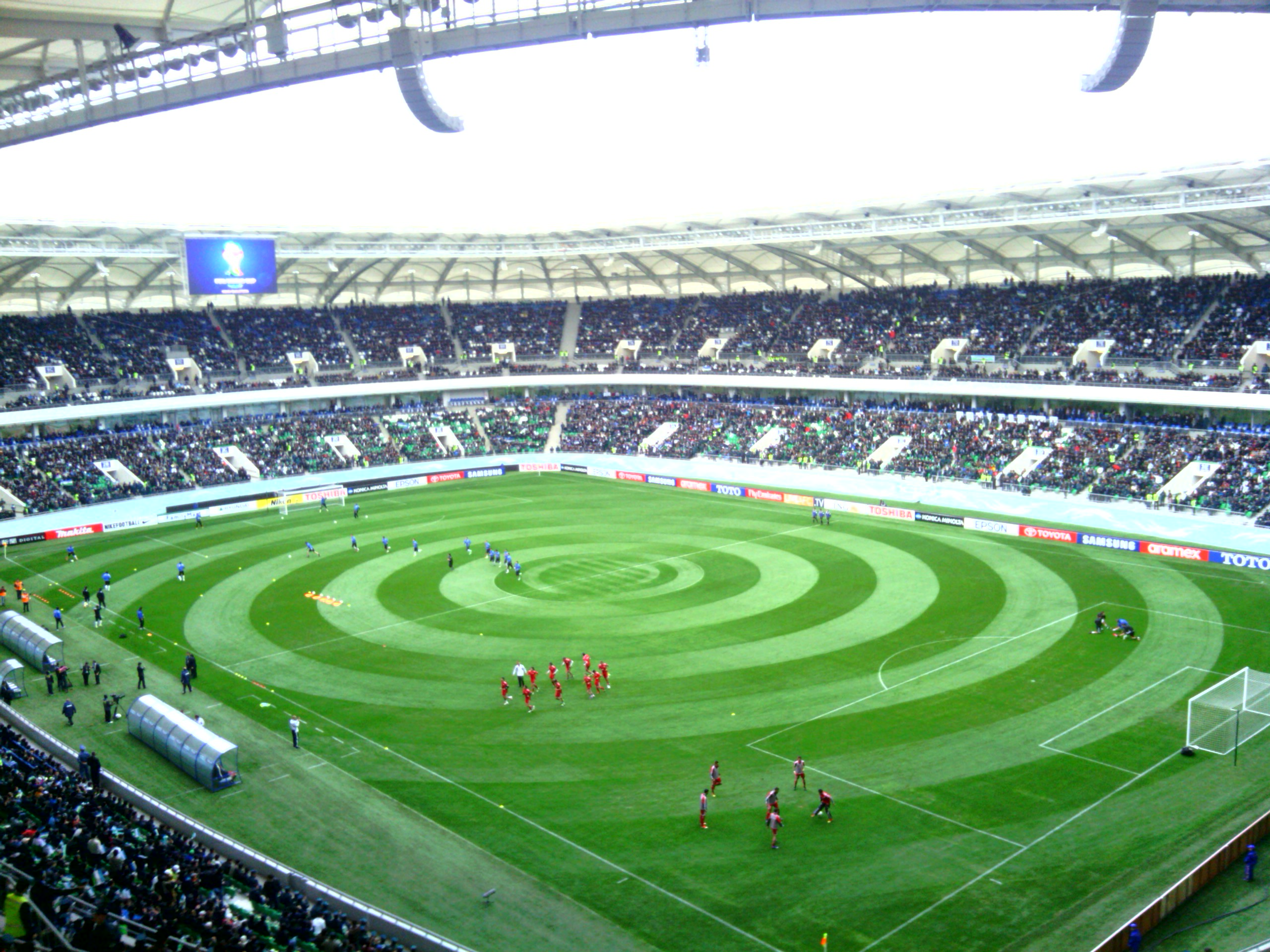
Milliy Stadium

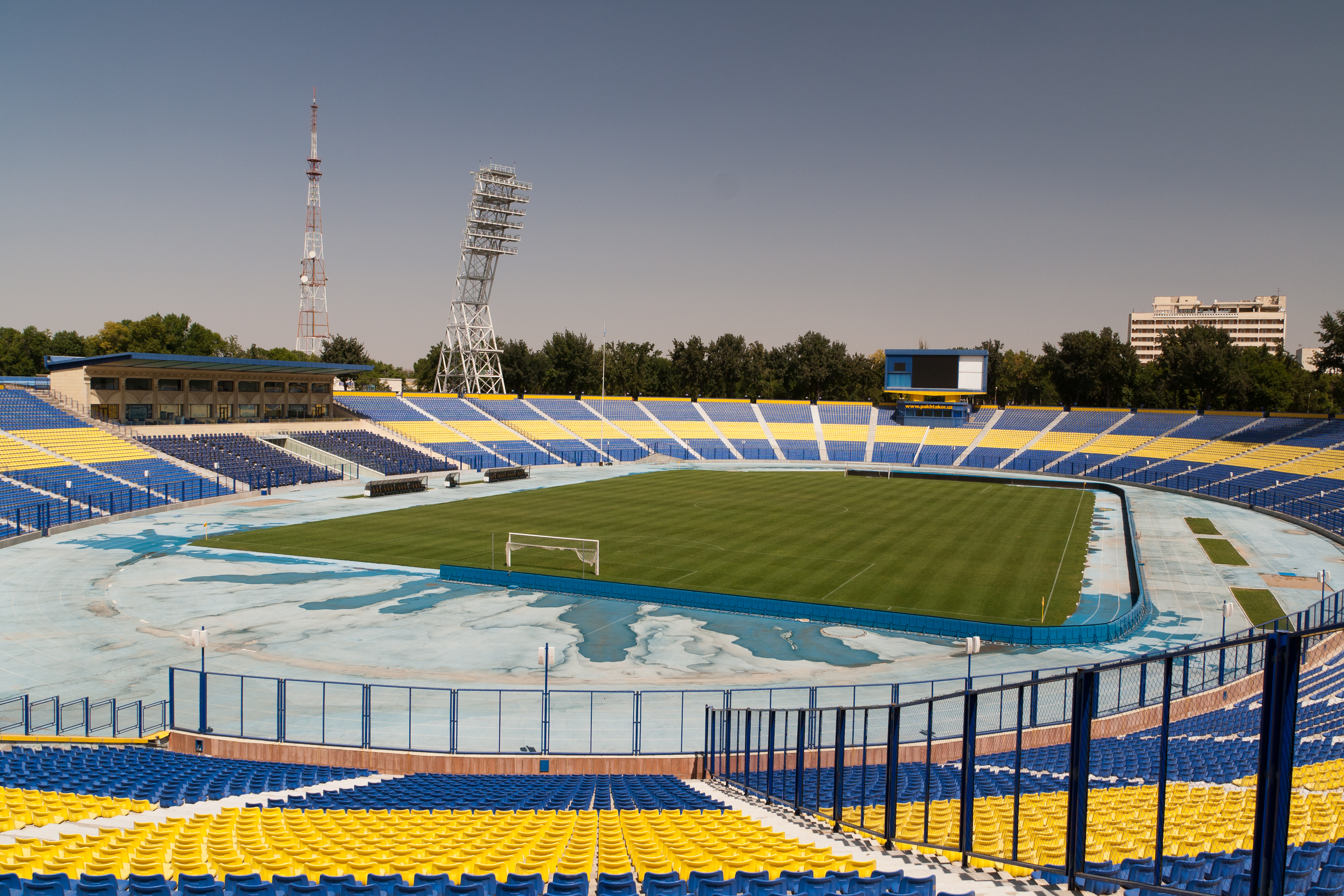
Pakhtakor Central Stadium

From its formation in 1992 until the end of 2012, the main home stadium of the Uzbekistan national football team was the Pakhtakor Central Stadium in Tashkent, built and opened in 1956. This stadium is also the venue for Pakhtakor Football Club. During the Soviet Union, this stadium was home for the Uzbekistan SSR national team. It was reconstructed in 1996, 2008 and 2012 and currently holds 35,000 spectators, previously at 55,000 spectators. The team also uses Milliy Stadium (formerly known as Bunyodkor Stadium), built in 2012 and accommodating 34,000 spectators. This stadium is also a home for the Bunyodkor Football Club.

=== Home record ===
Venue	City	Played	Won	Drawn	Lost	GF	GA	First match	Last match
Pakhtakor Central Stadium	Tashkent	67	38	17	12	158	53	28 June 1992	12 November 2026
Milliy Stadium	Tashkent	35	24	6	5	56	14	26 March 2013	30 March 2026
MHSK Stadium	Tashkent	8	6	2	0	25	1	13 October 2007	27 August 2008
Markaziy Stadium	Namangan	5	5	0	0	16	3	25 March 2022	14 June 2022
Olympic City Stadium	Tashkent	5	4	1	0	10	2	30 August 2025	9 October 2025
JAR Stadium	Tashkent	3	1	0	2	3	3	14 November 2009	29 May 2014
Dinamo Samarkand Stadium	Samarkand	2	2	0	0	8	1	11 July 1999	18 August 1999
Istiqlol Stadium	Fergana	1	1	0	0	3	1	24 September 2026	24 September 2026
Lokomotiv Stadium	Tashkent	1	1	0	0	2	1	3 September 2020	3 September 2020
AGMK Stadium	Almalyk	1	0	0	1	0	1	27 May 2014	27 May 2014
Markaziy Stadium	Qarshi	1	0	1	0	0	0	7 February 2007	7 February 2007
NBU Stadium	Tashkent	1	1	0	0	8	1	29 February 2000	29 February 2000
Total		129	82	27	20	285	80		

Last updated: 12 November 2026. Statistics include official FIFA-recognised matches only.

== Results and fixtures ==
The following is a list of match results in the last 12 months, as well as any future matches that have been scheduled.

Win Draw Loss Fixture

=== 2026 ===
27 March 2026 2026 FIFA Series	Uzbekistan	3–1	Gabon	Tashkent, Uzbekistan
19:00 UTC+5	Shomurodov 14'; Urozov 59'; Odilov 90+4'	Report	Averlant 6'	Stadium: Bunyodkor Stadium; Attendance: 28,840; Referee: Abdullo Davlatov (Tajikistan)

30 March 2026 2026 FIFA Series	Uzbekistan	0–0 (5–4 p)	Venezuela	Tashkent, Uzbekistan
19:00 UTC+5		Report		Stadium: Bunyodkor Stadium; Attendance: 29,225; Referee: Mederbek Taichiev (Kyrgyzstan)
	Penalties
	Iskanderov (penalty scored); Temirov (penalty scored); Ashurmatov (penalty scored); Shukurov (penalty scored); Mozgovoy (penalty scored)		(penalty scored) Rondón; (penalty scored) L. González; (penalty missed) Sosa; (penalty scored) Quintero; (penalty scored) Segovia

1 June 2026 Friendly	Canada	2–0	Uzbekistan	Edmonton, Canada
19:00 UTC−6	Osorio 58'; Nelson 90+1'	Report		Stadium: Commonwealth Stadium; Attendance: 46,164; Referee: Marco Ortíz (Mexico)

8 June 2026 Friendly	Netherlands	2–1	Uzbekistan	New York, United States
14:45 UTC−4	Gakpo 32' (pen.), 90+7' (pen.)	Report	Sergeev 90+2'	Stadium: Icahn Stadium; Attendance: 0 (BCD); Referee: Alyssa Pennington (United States)

17 June 2026 2026 World Cup GS	Uzbekistan	1–3	Colombia	Mexico City, Mexico
20:00 UTC−6	Fayzullaev 60'	Report	Muñoz 40'; Díaz 65'; Campaz 90+9'	Stadium: Estadio Azteca; Attendance: 80,824; Referee: Anthony Taylor (England)

23 June 2026 2026 World Cup GS	Portugal	5–0	Uzbekistan	Houston, United States
12:00 UTC−5	Ronaldo 6', 39'; Mendes 17'; Nematov 60' (o.g.); Leão 87'	Report		Stadium: NRG Stadium; Attendance: 68,777; Referee: Jalal Jayed (Morocco)

27 June 2026 2026 World Cup GS	DR Congo	3–1	Uzbekistan	Atlanta, United States
19:30 UTC−4	Wissa 68' (pen.), 90+1'; Mayele 78'	Report	Shomurodov 10'	Stadium: Mercedes-Benz Stadium; Attendance: 68,239; Referee: Felix Zwayer (Germany)

24 September 2026 Friendly	Uzbekistan	3–1	Iran	Fergana, Uzbekistan
19:00 UTC+5	Shomurodov 10', 58' (pen.); Norchaev 90+4'	Report	Urozov 49' (o.g.)	Stadium: Istiqlol Stadium; Attendance: 17,978; Referee: Kirill Levnikov (Russia)

1 October 2026 Friendly	Uzbekistan	4–1	Syria	Tashkent, Uzbekistan
19:00 UTC+5	Esanov 27'; Mozgovoy 45'; Norchaev 48', 90'	Report	Khakimov 90+2' (o.g.)	Stadium: Pakhtakor Central Stadium; Referee: Sayyodjon Zayniddinov (Tajikistan)

6 October 2026 Friendly	South Korea	2–0	Uzbekistan	Yongin, South Korea
20:00 UTC+9	Son Heung-min 6'; Oh Se-hun 60'	Report		Stadium: Yongin Mireu Stadium; Attendance: 24,587; Referee: Alex King (Australia)

12 November 2026 Friendly	Uzbekistan	2–3	Russia	Tashkent, Uzbekistan
20:00 UTC+5	Melyokhin 5' (o.g.); Karimov 46'	Report	Komlichenko 70', 75'; Al. Miranchuk 79'	Stadium: Pakhtakor Central Stadium; Attendance: 9,815; Referee: Sadullo Gulmurodi (Tajikistan)

17 November 2026 Friendly	Saudi Arabia	1–2	Uzbekistan	Doha, Qatar
18:30 UTC+3	Al-Buraikan 23'	Report	Esanov 19', 35'	Stadium: Jassim bin Hamad Stadium; Referee: Mohamed Al-Sherif (Qatar)

=== 2027 ===
December 2027 2027 Asian Cup GS	Uzbekistan	v	Jordan	Jeddah, Saudi Arabia
--:-- UTC−3				Stadium: King Abdullah Sports City Stadium

=== 2028 ===
January 2028 2027 Asian Cup GS	North Korea	v	Uzbekistan	Riyadh, Saudi Arabia
--:-- UTC−3				Stadium: Kingdom Arena

January 2028 2027 Asian Cup GS	Uzbekistan	v	Bahrain	Jeddah, Saudi Arabia
--:-- UTC−3				Stadium: Prince Abdullah Al-Faisal Sports City Stadium

== Coaching staff ==
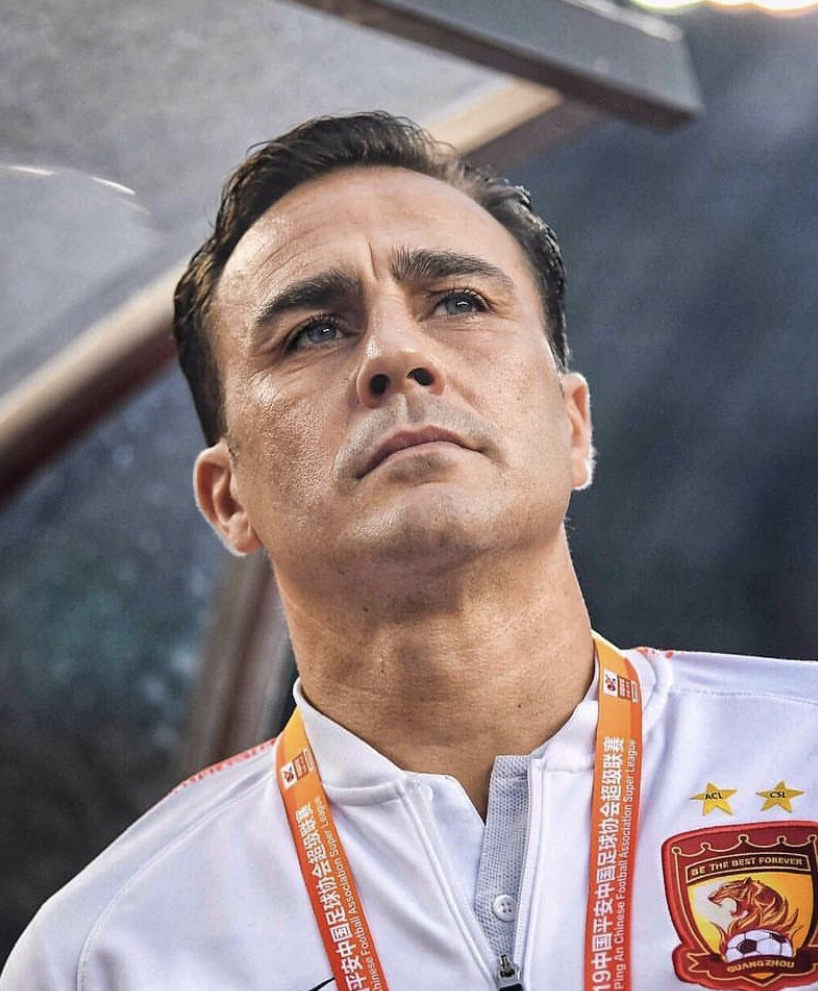
Current head coach Fabio Cannavaro

As of 17 November 2026

Position	Name
Head coach	(Italy) Fabio Cannavaro
Assistant coaches	(Italy) Paolo Cannavaro
Assistant coaches	(Italy) Francesco Troise
Goalkeeper coach	(Italy) Antonio Chimenti
Fitness coach	(Italy) Eugenio Albarella

=== Coaching history ===
Name	Period	Matches	Wins	Draws	Losses	Win%
(Uzbekistan) Rustam Akramov	June 1992 – October 1994	18	13	3	2	72%
(Uzbekistan) Alexander Ivankov	July 1995 – November 1995	4	0	1	3	0%
(Uzbekistan) Bahadir Ibrahimov	February 1996 – December 1996	8	2	0	6	25%
(Uzbekistan) Rustam Mirsadiqov	May 1997 – October 1997	12	5	3	4	42%
(Brazil) Ubirajara Veiga da Silva	October 1997 – December 1998	11	5	4	2	45%
(Uzbekistan) Mahmud Rahimov	July 1999 – November 1999	7	6	0	1	86%
(Uzbekistan) Viktor Borisov (caretaker)	February 2000	1	1	0	0	100%
(Russia) Pavel Sadyrin	April 2000 – May 2000	1	0	0	1	0%
(Uzbekistan) Yuriy Sarkisyan	July 2000 – October 2000	6	1	1	4	17%
(Russia) Vladimir Salkov	December 2000 – October 2001	21	12	3	6	57%
(Kazakhstan) Leonid Ostroushko (caretaker)	October 2001	1	1	0	0	100%
(Uzbekistan) Ravshan Haydarov	January 2002 – November 2004	23	13	5	5	54%
(Germany) Hans-Jürgen Gede	February 2005 – April 2005	3	0	1	2	0%
(Uzbekistan) Ravshan Haydarov	June 2005 – July 2005	2	0	1	1	0%
(England) Bobby Houghton	July 2005 – December 2005	4	2	2	0	50%
(Russia) Valery Nepomnyashchy	January 2006 – December 2006	6	3	2	1	50%
(Uzbekistan) Rauf Inileev	January 2007 – September 2008	27	13	4	10	46%
(Uzbekistan) Mirjalal Qasimov	September 2008 – April 2010	15	4	3	8	27%
(Uzbekistan) Vadim Abramov	April 2010 – June 2012	28	11	5	12	39%
(Uzbekistan) Mirjalal Qasimov	June 2012 – June 2015	40	19	9	12	48%
(Uzbekistan) Samvel Babayan	June 2015 – September 2017	24	16	1	7	66%
(Uzbekistan) Ruziqul Berdiev (caretaker)	October 2017	1	0	0	1	0%
(Uzbekistan) Timur Kapadze (caretaker)	February 2018 – June 2018	4	0	1	3	0%
(Argentina) Héctor Cúper	August 2018 – September 2019	17	7	4	6	41%
(Uzbekistan) Vadim Abramov	September 2019 – June 2021	17	10	0	7	58%
(Slovenia) Srečko Katanec	August 2021 – January 2025	43	27	9	7	62%
(Uzbekistan) Timur Kapadze	January 2025 – October 2025	9	5	4	0	55%
(Italy) Fabio Cannavaro	October 2025 –	16	6	2	8	37%

== Players ==
=== Current squad ===
The following 30 players were called up to the friendly matches against Russia on 12 November and against Saudi Arabia on 17 November 2026.
Caps and goals correct as of 6 October 2026, after the match against South Korea.

No.	Pos.	Player	Date of birth (age)	Caps	Goals	Club
1	GK	Abduvohid Nematov	20 March 2001 (age 25)	18	0	(Uzbekistan Football Association) Nasaf
12	GK	Vladimir Nazarov	3 June 2002 (age 24)	2	0	(Uzbekistan Football Association) Pakhtakor
16	GK	Edem Nemanov	25 December 2003 (age 22)	0	0	(Uzbekistan Football Association) Dinamo Samarqand
	GK	Samandar Muratbaev	3 March 2005 (age 21)	0	0	(Uzbekistan Football Association) Nasaf
5	DF	Rustam Ashurmatov	7 July 1996 (age 30)	52	1	(Football Federation Islamic Republic of Iran) Esteghlal
13	DF	Sherzod Nasrullaev	23 July 1998 (age 28)	45	2	(Uzbekistan Football Association) Pakhtakor
4	DF	Bekhruz Karimov	8 July 2007 (age 19)	7	0	(Swiss Football Association) Lugano
5	DF	Jakhongir Urozov	18 January 2004 (age 22)	9	1	(Russian Football Union) Rubin Kazan
25	DF	Makhmud Makhamadzhonov	30 June 2003 (age 23)	3	0	(Russian Football Union) Dynamo Makhachkala
15	DF	Mukhammadrasul Abdumajidov	23 July 2004 (age 22)	1	0	(Uzbekistan Football Association) Pakhtakor
	DF	Giyosjon Rizakulov	20 February 2005 (age 21)	0	0	(Uzbekistan Football Association) Qizilqum
	DF	Dilshod Murtozoev	3 September 2006 (age 20)	0	0	(Uzbekistan Football Association) Nasaf
6	MF	Akmal Mozgovoy	2 April 1999 (age 27)	31	2	(Uzbekistan Football Association) Pakhtakor
9	MF	Odiljon Hamrobekov	13 February 1996 (age 30)	80	1	(Football Federation Islamic Republic of Iran) Tractor
17	MF	Dostonbek Khamdamov	24 July 1996 (age 30)	41	5	(Uzbekistan Football Association) Pakhtakor
10	MF	Azizjon Ganiev	22 February 1998 (age 28)	27	0	(United Arab Emirates Football Association) Al Bataeh
22	MF	Abbosbek Fayzullaev	3 October 2003 (age 23)	38	9	(Turkish Football Federation) İstanbul Başakşehir
	MF	Abror Ismoilov	8 January 1998 (age 28)	11	0	(Uzbekistan Football Association) Neftchi
23	MF	Sherzod Esanov	1 February 2003 (age 23)	5	1	(Uzbekistan Football Association) Bukhara
19	MF	Ruslanbek Jiyanov	5 June 2001 (age 25)	10	1	(Uzbekistan Football Association) Navbahor Namangan
24	MF	Diyor Kholmatov	22 July 2002 (age 24)	9	0	(Uzbekistan Football Association) Navbahor Namangan
7	MF	Umarali Rakhmonaliev	18 August 2003 (age 23)	2	0	(Association of Football Federations of Azerbaijan) Sabah
8	MF	Jasurbek Jaloliddinov	15 May 2002 (age 24)	2	0	(Uzbekistan Football Association) Sogdiana
11	MF	Aziz Kholmurodov	28 September 2003 (age 23)	2	0	(Uzbekistan Football Association) AGMK
	MF	Azizbek Tulkinbekov	10 February 2007 (age 19)	0	0	(Uzbekistan Football Association) Bunyodkor
	MF	Nodir Abdurazzokov	27 May 2004 (age 22)	0	0	(Uzbekistan Football Association) AGMK
18	MF	Bekhruz Uktamov	21 August 2006 (age 20)	0	0	(Uzbekistan Football Association) Surkhon
14	FW	Eldor Shomurodov (Captain)	29 June 1995 (age 31)	97	47	(Turkish Football Federation) İstanbul Başakşehir
20	FW	Azizbek Amonov	30 October 1997 (age 29)	17	2	(Uzbekistan Football Association) Dinamo Samarqand
21	FW	Khusain Norchaev	6 February 2002 (age 24)	6	4	(Uzbekistan Football Association) Navbahor Namangan

=== Recent call-ups ===
The following players have been called for the last 12 months and are still eligible to represent.

Pos.	Player	Date of birth (age)	Caps	Goals	Club	Latest call-up
GK	Utkir Yusupov	4 January 1991 (age 35)	41	0	(Uzbekistan) Navbahor Namangan	2026 FIFA World Cup
GK	Botirali Ergashev	23 June 1995 (age 31)	2	0	(Uzbekistan) Neftchi Fergana	2026 FIFA World Cup
DF	Mukhammad Khakimov	4 October 2009 (age 17)	1	0	(Uzbekistan) Bunyodkor	v. South Korea, 6 October 2026
DF	Nurmukhammad Abduganiev	23 August 2007 (age 19)	1	0	(Uzbekistan) Neftchi Fergana	v. South Korea, 6 October 2026
DF	Abdukodir Khusanov	29 February 2004 (age 22)	33	0	(England) Manchester City	v. South Korea, 6 October 2026
DF	Khojiakbar Alijonov	19 April 1997 (age 29)	56	3	(Uzbekistan) Pakhtakor	v. South Korea, 6 October 2026
DF	Avazbek Ulmasaliev	27 March 2000 (age 26)	0	0	(Uzbekistan) AGMK	2026 FIFA World Cup
DF	Umar Eshmurodov	30 November 1992 (age 33)	29	0	(Uzbekistan) Nasaf	2026 FIFA World Cup ^{RET}
DF	Abdulla Abdullaev	1 September 1997 (age 29)	19	0	(United Arab Emirates) Dibba	2026 FIFA World Cup
DF	Farrukh Sayfiev	17 January 1991 (age 35)	46	1	(Uzbekistan) Neftchi Fergana	2026 FIFA World Cup
DF	Mukhammadkodir Khamraliev	6 July 2001 (age 25)	2	0	(Uzbekistan) Pakhtakor	2026 FIFA World Cup ^{PRE}
DF	Diyor Ortikboev	6 January 2003 (age 23)	0	0	(Uzbekistan) Xorazm	2026 FIFA World Cup ^{PRE}
DF	Ibrokhimkhalil Yuldoshev	14 February 2001 (age 25)	16	1	(Uzbekistan) Neftchi Fergana	2026 FIFA World Cup ^{PRE / INJ}
DF	Husniddin Aliqulov	4 April 1999 (age 27)	34	3	(Turkey) Çaykur Rizespor	v. Iran, 18 November 2025 ^{INJ}
MF	Sardorbek Bakhromov	16 February 2005 (age 21)	0	0	(Uzbekistan) Nasaf	v. South Korea, 6 October 2026
MF	Sadriddin Khasanov	21 May 2008 (age 18)	0	0	(Portugal) Braga	v. South Korea, 6 October 2026
MF	Oston Urunov	19 December 2000 (age 25)	44	10	(Iran) Persepolis	2026 FIFA World Cup
MF	Otabek Shukurov	22 June 1996 (age 30)	91	10	(Serbia) Radnik Surdulica	2026 FIFA World Cup
MF	Jamshid Iskanderov	16 October 1993 (age 33)	39	4	(Uzbekistan) Neftchi Fergana	2026 FIFA World Cup
MF	Jaloliddin Masharipov	1 September 1993 (age 33)	74	12	(Iran) Esteghlal	2026 FIFA World Cup ^{INJ}
MF	Kuvondik Ruziev	6 October 1994 (age 32)	6	0	(Uzbekistan) Navbahor Namangan	2026 FIFA World Cup ^{PRE}
MF	Alisher Odilov	15 July 2001 (age 25)	2	1	(Uzbekistan) Neftchi Fergana	2026 FIFA World Cup ^{PRE}
MF	Ibragim Ibragimov	12 January 2001 (age 25)	0	0	(Uzbekistan) Pakhtakor	v. Venezuela, 30 March 2026
MF	Khojimat Erkinov	29 May 2001 (age 25)	42	7	(Uzbekistan) Pakhtakor	v. Iran, 18 November 2025
MF	Azizbek Turgunboev	1 October 1994 (age 32)	41	6	(Uzbekistan) Andijon	v. Iran, 18 November 2025
FW	Mukhammadali Urinboev	24 April 2005 (age 21)	0	0	(Belgium) Royal Antwerp	v. South Korea, 6 October 2026
FW	Igor Sergeev	30 April 1993 (age 33)	87	25	(Iran) Persepolis	2026 FIFA World Cup
FW	Sherzod Temirov	27 October 1998 (age 28)	3	0	(Iraq) Zakho	2026 FIFA World Cup ^{PRE}
^{U23} Included in the U-23 national team.^{PRE} Preliminary squad standby.^{SUS} Player suspended.^{INJ} Player withdrew from the squad due to an injury.^{RET} Retired from the national team.^{WD} Player withdrew from the squad for non-injury related reasons.

== Player records ==
As of 17 November 2026
Players in bold are still active with Uzbekistan.

=== Most capped players ===
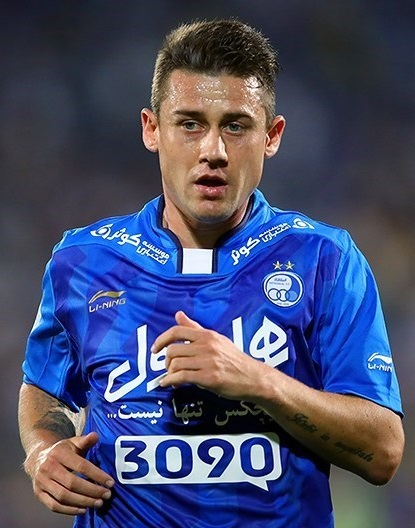
Server Djeparov is Uzbekistan's most capped player with 128 appearances.

Rank	Player	Caps	Goals	Career
1	Server Djeparov	128	25	2002–2017
2	Timur Kapadze	119	10	2002–2015
3	Odil Ahmedov	108	21	2007–2021
4	Ignatiy Nesterov	105	0	2002–2019
5	Anzur Ismailov	102	3	2007–2019
6	**Eldor Shomurodov**	98	47	2015–present
7	Alexander Geynrikh	97	31	2002–2017
8	**Otabek Shukurov**	91	10	2016–present
9	**Igor Sergeev**	87	25	2013–present
10	Aziz Haydarov	86	1	2007–2018

=== Top goalscorers ===
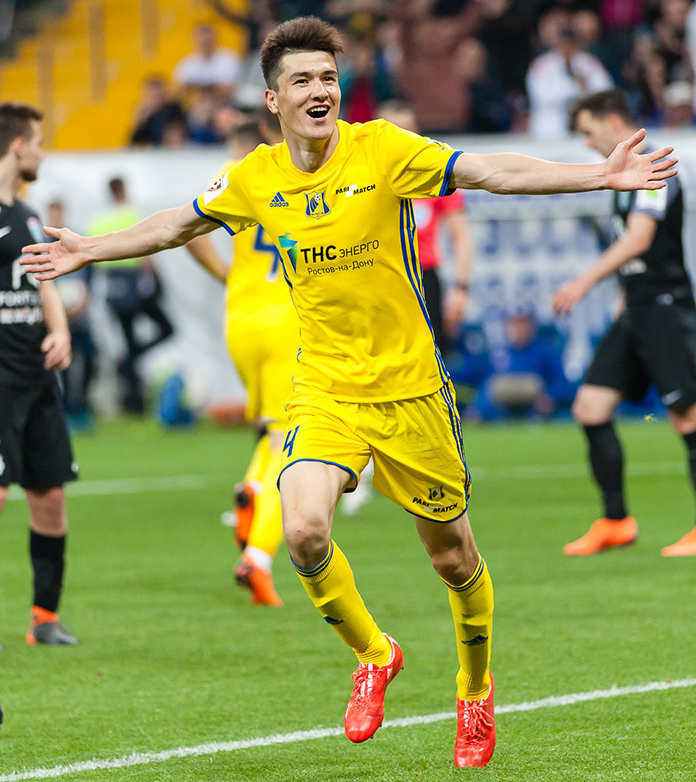
Eldor Shomurodov is Uzbekistan's top scorer with 47 goals.

Rank	Player	Goals	Caps	Ratio	Career
1	**Eldor Shomurodov**	47	98	0.48	2015–present
2	Maxim Shatskikh	34	61	0.56	1999–2014
3	Mirjalol Qosimov	31	67	0.46	1992–2005
3	Alexander Geynrikh	31	97	0.32	2002–2017
5	**Igor Sergeev**	25	87	0.29	2013–present
5	Server Djeparov	25	128	0.2	2002–2017
7	Odil Ahmedov	21	108	0.19	2007–2021
8	Igor Shkvyrin	20	31	0.65	1992–2000
9	Jafar Irismetov	15	36	0.42	1997–2007
10	Ulugbek Bakayev	14	52	0.27	2001–2014

== Competitive record ==
=== FIFA World Cup ===
FIFA World Cup record										Qualification record						
Year	Result	Position	Pld	W	D	L	GF	GA	Squad	Pld	W	D	L	GF	GA	—
1930 to 1990	Part of the Soviet Union									Part of the Soviet Union						
(United States) 1994	FIFA member from 1992. Not admitted to the tournament. (Note: FIFA adopted a decision not to allow the national teams of those former Soviet republics that did not participate in the qualification draw on 8 December 1991 to participate in the 1994 FIFA World Cup. A proposition by Ukraine, supported by Georgia and Armenia, to arrange a separate tournament for all successor states of the Soviet Union was blocked by Russia.)									Not a FIFA member						1994
(France) 1998	Did not qualify									14	6	4	4	33	21	1998
(South Korea) (Japan) 2002	Did not qualify									14	7	3	4	33	19	2002
(Germany) 2006	Did not qualify									14	6	5	3	24	15	2006
(South Africa) 2010	Did not qualify									16	8	1	7	33	17	2010
(Brazil) 2014	Did not qualify									18	11	5	2	28	9	2014
(Russia) 2018	Did not qualify									18	11	1	6	26	14	2018
(Qatar) 2022	Did not qualify									8	5	0	3	18	9	2022
(Canada) (Mexico) (United States) 2026	Group stage	46th	3	0	0	3	2	11	Squad	16	10	5	1	27	11	2026
(Morocco) (Portugal) (Spain) 2030	To be determined									To be determined						2030
(Saudi Arabia) 2034	To be determined									To be determined						2034
Total	Group stage	1/8	3	0	0	3	2	11	—	118	64	24	30	222	115	—

=== AFC Asian Cup ===
AFC Asian Cup record										Qualification record						
Year	Result	Position	Pld	W	D	L	GF	GA	Squad	Pld	W	D	L	GF	GA	—
1956 to 1988	Part of the Soviet Union									Part of the Soviet Union						
(Japan) 1992	Not an AFC member									Not an AFC member						1992
(United Arab Emirates) 1996	Group stage	10th	3	1	0	2	3	6	Squad	2	1	0	1	5	4	1996
(Lebanon) 2000	Group stage	12th	3	0	1	2	2	14	Squad	4	4	0	0	16	2	2000
(China) 2004	Quarter-finals	6th	4	3	1	0	5	2	Squad	6	4	1	1	13	6	2004
(Indonesia) (Malaysia) (Thailand) (Vietnam) 2007	Quarter-finals	7th	4	2	0	2	10	4	Squad	6	3	2	1	14	4	2007
(Qatar) 2011	Fourth place	4th	6	3	1	2	10	13	Squad	4	3	0	1	7	3	2011
(Australia) 2015	Quarter-finals	8th	4	2	0	2	5	5	Squad	6	3	2	1	10	4	2015
(United Arab Emirates) 2019	Round of 16	10th	4	2	1	1	7	3	Squad	8	7	0	1	20	7	2019
(Qatar) 2023	Quarter-finals	5th	5	2	3	0	7	3	Squad	11	8	0	3	27	9	2023
(Saudi Arabia) 2027	Qualified									6	4	2	0	13	4	2027
Total	Fourth place	9/9	33	15	7	11	49	50	—	53	37	7	9	125	43	—

AFC Asian Cup history
First match	China 0–2 Uzbekistan (6 December 1996; Al Ain, United Arab Emirates)
Biggest win	Uzbekistan 5–0 Malaysia (14 July 2007; Kuala Lumpur, Malaysia)
Biggest defeat	Japan 8–1 Uzbekistan (17 October 2000; Sidon, Lebanon)
Best result	Fourth place (2011)
Worst result	Group stage (1996, 2000)

=== Asian Games ===
Football at the Asian Games has been an under-23 tournament since 2002.

Asian Games record
Year	Result	Position	Pld	W	D	L	GF	GA	Squad
1951 to 1990	Part of the Soviet Union								
(Japan) 1994	Gold medal	1st	7	7	0	0	23	7	Squad
(Thailand) 1998	Quarter-finals	7th	6	3	2	1	25	8	Squad
2002–present	See Uzbekistan national under-23 football team								
Total	1 Gold medal	2/2	13	10	2	1	48	15	—

Asian Games history
First match	Saudi Arabia 1–4 Uzbekistan (1 October 1994; Hiroshima, Japan)
Last match	Uzbekistan 0–4 Iran (14 December 1998; Bangkok, Thailand)
Biggest win	Uzbekistan 5–0 Malaysia (3 October 1994; Hiroshima, Japan)
Biggest defeat	Uzbekistan 0–4 Iran (14 December 1998; Bangkok, Thailand)
Best result	Gold medal (1994)
Worst result	Quarter-finals (1998)

=== CAFA Nations Cup ===
CAFA Nations Cup record
Year	Result	Position	Pld	W	D	L	GF	GA	Squad
(Kyrgyzstan) (Uzbekistan) 2023	Runners-up	2nd	4	3	0	1	10	2	Squad
(Tajikistan) (Uzbekistan) 2025	Champions	1st	4	3	1	0	8	2	Squad
Total	1 Title	2/2	8	6	1	1	18	4	—

CAFA Nations Cup history
First match	Uzbekistan 3–0 Oman (11 June 2023; Tashkent, Uzbekistan)
Biggest win	Uzbekistan 5–1 Tajikistan (17 June 2023; Tashkent, Uzbekistan); Uzbekistan 4–0 Kyrgyzstan (5 September 2025; Tashkent, Uzbekistan)
Biggest defeat	Uzbekistan 0–1 Iran (20 June 2023; Tashkent, Uzbekistan)
Best result	Champions (2025)
Worst result	Runners-up (2023)

== Head-to-head record ==
All opponents that the Uzbekistan football team has played at least once

As of 17 November 2026 after the match against Saudi Arabia.

Positive Record Neutral Record Negative Record

Nations	Pld	W	D	L	GF	GA	GD	Win %	Confederation	Best win	Worst loss
Albania	1	0	0	1	0	1	−1	0.00	UEFA	—	0–1
Armenia	2	0	0	2	1	5	−4	0.00	UEFA	—	1–3
Australia	5	0	2	3	1	10	−9	0.00	AFC	—	0–6
Azerbaijan	10	2	4	4	10	11	−1	20.00	UEFA	5–1	1–3
Bahrain	11	4	5	2	15	8	+7	36.36	AFC	4–0	0–1
Bangladesh	3	3	0	0	15	0	+15	100.00	AFC	6–0	—
Belarus	3	0	1	2	3	5	−2	0.00	UEFA	—	1–2
Bolivia	1	1	0	0	1	0	+1	100.00	CONMEBOL	1–0	—
Bosnia and Herzegovina	2	1	1	0	2	1	+1	50.00	UEFA	2–1	—
Burkina Faso	1	1	0	0	1	0	+1	100.00	CAF	1–0	—
Cambodia	2	2	0	0	10	1	+9	100.00	AFC	6–0	—
Cameroon	1	1	0	0	2	0	+2	100.00	CAF	2–0	—
Canada	2	0	0	2	1	4	−3	0.00	CONCACAF	—	1–2
China	14	8	1	5	21	15	+6	57.14	AFC	3–0	1–3
Chinese Taipei	7	7	0	0	30	1	+29	100.00	AFC	9–0	—
Colombia	1	0	0	1	1	3	−2	0.00	CONMEBOL	—	1–3
Costa Rica	1	0	0	1	1	2	−1	0.00	CONCACAF	—	1–2
DR Congo	1	0	0	1	1	3	−2	0.00	CAF	—	1–3
Egypt	1	1	0	0	2	0	+2	100.00	CAF	2–0	—
Estonia	2	0	2	0	3	3	+0	0.00	UEFA	—	—
Gabon	1	1	0	0	3	1	+2	100.00	CAF	3–1	—
Georgia	2	0	1	1	2	3	−1	0.00	UEFA	—	0–1
Hong Kong	9	6	3	0	15	3	+12	66.67	AFC	4–1	—
India	6	5	1	0	14	3	+11	83.33	AFC	4–0	—
Indonesia	2	1	1	0	4	1	+3	50.00	AFC	3–0	—
Iran	19	3	6	10	11	21	−10	15.79	AFC	3–1	0–4
Iraq	11	5	3	3	10	8	+2	45.45	AFC	2–0	0–2
Israel	1	0	0	1	0	2	−2	0.00	UEFA	—	0–2
Japan	11	1	3	7	10	30	−20	9.09	AFC	1–0	1–8
Jordan	15	7	6	2	21	15	+6	46.67	AFC	4–1	0–3
Kazakhstan	7	3	3	1	10	4	+6	42.86	UEFA	4–0	0–1
Kuwait	7	4	1	2	14	9	+5	57.14	AFC	3–0	1–2
Kyrgyzstan	12	12	0	0	43	7	+36	100.00	AFC	6–0	—
Latvia	1	1	0	0	3	0	+3	100.00	UEFA	3–0	—
Lebanon	6	4	2	0	8	1	+7	66.67	AFC	3–0	—
Malaysia	6	6	0	0	24	3	+21	100.00	AFC	5–0	—
Maldives	1	1	0	0	4	0	+4	100.00	AFC	4–0	—
Mexico	1	0	1	0	3	3	+0	0.00	CONCACAF	—	—
Mongolia	2	2	0	0	23	1	+22	100.00	AFC	15–0	—
Montenegro	1	0	0	1	0	1	−1	0.00	UEFA	—	0–1
Morocco	1	0	0	1	0	2	−2	0.00	CAF	—	0–2
Netherlands	1	0	0	1	1	2	−1	0.00	UEFA	—	1–2
New Zealand	1	1	0	0	3	1	+2	100.00	OFC	3–1	—
Nigeria	2	0	0	2	2	4	−2	0.00	CAF	—	2–3
North Korea	12	9	2	1	22	7	+15	75.00	AFC	4–0	2–4
Oman	8	3	1	4	13	10	+3	37.50	AFC	5–0	2–4
Palestine	6	5	0	1	10	2	+8	83.33	AFC	3–0	0–2
Philippines	2	2	0	0	6	1	+5	100.00	AFC	5–1	—
Portugal	1	0	0	1	0	5	−5	0.00	UEFA	—	0–5
Qatar	17	10	3	4	30	17	+13	58.82	AFC	5–1	0–3
Russia	2	0	1	1	2	3	−1	0.00	UEFA	—	2–3
Saudi Arabia	13	5	1	7	17	28	−11	38.46	AFC	4–1	0–5
Senegal	1	0	1	0	1	1	+0	0.00	CAF	—	—
Singapore	4	4	0	0	18	4	+14	100.00	AFC	5–0	—
Slovakia	1	0	0	1	1	4	−3	0.00	UEFA	—	1–4
South Korea	17	1	4	12	14	36	−22	5.88	AFC	1–0	1–5
South Sudan	1	1	0	0	3	0	+3	100.00	CAF	3–0	—
Sri Lanka	2	2	0	0	9	0	+9	100.00	AFC	6–0	—
Sweden	1	0	0	1	1	2	−1	0.00	UEFA	—	1–2
Syria	8	3	2	3	9	6	+3	37.50	AFC	4–1	1–2
Tajikistan	10	6	3	1	23	10	+13	60.00	AFC	5–0	0–4
Thailand	10	5	0	5	19	19	+0	50.00	AFC	3–0	1–4
Turkey	1	0	0	1	0	2	−2	0.00	UEFA	—	0–2
Turkmenistan	14	12	1	1	34	8	+26	85.71	AFC	4–0	0–1
Uganda	1	1	0	0	4	2	+2	100.00	CAF	4–2	—
Ukraine	2	0	0	2	1	4	−3	0.00	UEFA	—	0–2
United Arab Emirates	19	5	5	9	20	25	−5	26.32	AFC	4–0	1–4
United States	1	0	0	1	0	3	−3	0.00	CONCACAF	—	0–3
Uruguay	3	0	0	3	1	8	−7	0.00	CONMEBOL	—	0–3
Venezuela	2	0	2	0	1	1	+0	0.00	CONMEBOL	—	—
Vietnam	3	3	0	0	8	1	+7	100.00	AFC	3–0	—
Yemen	6	6	0	0	16	2	+14	100.00	AFC	5–0	—
Total (72)	365	177	73	115	632	409	+223	48.49	—	15–0	1–8

=== By confederation ===
Name	Pld	Won	Drawn	Lost	GF	GA	GD	Win%	First match	Last match
AFC	300	162	56	82	561	313	+248	54.00	17.06.1992	17.11.2026
UEFA	41	7	13	21	40	58	−18	17.07	14.04.1998	12.11.2026
CAF	11	6	1	4	19	13	+6	54.55	20.10.1995	27.06.2026
CONCACAF	5	0	1	4	5	12	−7	0.00	07.06.2016	01.06.2026
CONMEBOL	7	1	2	4	4	12	−8	14.29	07.06.2018	17.06.2026
OFC	1	1	0	0	3	1	+2	100.00	08.09.2014	
Total	365	177	73	115	632	409	+223	48.49	17.06.1992	17.11.2026

== FIFA ranking history ==
As of 7 October 2026

	Rank	Date
Best rank	45	Nov. 2006 – Jan. 2007
Current rank	59	October 2026
Worst rank	119	November 1996

- FIFA-ranking yearly averages for Uzbekistan (1994–2024)

Legend: Best ranking Worst ranking Best mover Worst mover

Uzbekistan's FIFA world rankings
Rank	Year	Pld	Best		Worst	
Rank	Year	Pld	Rank	Move	Rank	Move
50	2025	13	50	▲7	57	▼1
58	2024	14	58	▲8	66	▼1
68	2023	13	68	▲9	75	▼3
77	2022	10	77	▲12	85	▼2
84	2021	9	83	▲2	86	▼3
85	2020	6	84	▲1	85	▼4
85	2019	16	82	▲4	89	▼7
95	2018	10	72	▲3	96	▼15
78	2017	8	60	▲2	80	▼18
62	2016	12	48	▲26	74	▼14
74	2015	13	71	▲2	76	▼5
74	2014	13	51	▲13	74	▼17
68	2013	12	55	▲11	68	▼13
67	2012	13	63	▲10	77	▼4
75	2011	17	73	▲33	108	▼2
109	2010	7	75	▲1	109	▼20
76	2009	11	69	▲3	85	▼11
72	2008	13	55	▲19	76	▼18
64	2007	18	45	▲11	64	▼12
45	2006	6	45	▲20	61	▼13
59	2005	8	46	▲7	62	▼4
47	2004	11	47	▲5	84	▼5
81	2003	10	109	▲13	112	▼5
98	2002	2	64	▲4	98	▼5
62	2001	20	60	▲1	74	▼6
71	2000	8	55	▲13	72	▼6
55	1999	7	55	▲4	88	▼
66	1998	9	66	▲41	107	▼2
79	1997	14	79	▲33	112	▼3
109	1996	8	95	▲2	119	▼19
97	1995	2	82	▲2	97	▼15
78	1994	11	77	▲1	78	▼1

== Honours ==
=== Intercontinental ===
- Afro-Asian Cup of Nations
  - (silver) Runners-up (1): 1995

=== Continental ===
- Asian Games^{1}
  - (gold) Gold Medal (1): 1994

=== Regional ===
- CAFA Nations Cup
  - (gold) Champions (1): 2025
  - (silver) Runners-up (1): 2023

=== Friendly ===
- FIFA Series (1): 2026
- Al Ain International Cup (1): 2025
- Nowruz Cup (1): 2022
- Merdeka Tournament (1): 2001

=== Awards ===
- CAFA Nations Cup Fair Play Award (1): 2023

=== Summary ===
Competition	1st place, gold medalist(s)	2nd place, silver medalist(s)	3rd place, bronze medalist(s)	Total
Afro-Asian Cup of Nations	0	1	0	1
Total	0	1	0	1

Notes

1. Competition organized by OCA, officially not recognized by FIFA.

== See also ==
- Uzbekistan national football team results
- Uzbekistan national under-23 football team
- Uzbekistan national under-20 football team
- Uzbekistan national under-17 football team
- Uzbekistan national futsal team
- Uzbekistan women's national futsal team
- Football in Uzbekistan
- Sport in Uzbekistan
