= Uzbekistan national football team results (2020–present) =

This is a list of football games played by the Uzbekistan national football team from 2020 to present.

== Record by opponent ==
As of 16 November 2026 after the match against Saudi Arabia.

Team	Pld	W	D	L	GF	GA	GD	WPCT
Australia	1	0	1	0	1	1	0	0.00
Belarus	1	0	0	1	0	1	−1	0.00
Bolivia	1	1	0	0	1	0	+1	100.00
Cameroon	1	1	0	0	2	0	+2	100.00
Canada	1	0	0	1	0	2	−2	0.00
China	1	1	0	0	2	1	+1	100.00
Colombia	1	0	0	1	1	3	−2	0.00
Costa Rica	1	0	0	1	1	2	−1	0.00
DR Congo	1	0	0	1	1	3	−2	0.00
Egypt	1	1	0	0	2	0	+2	100.00
Gabon	1	1	0	0	3	1	+2	100.00
Georgia	1	0	0	1	0	1	−1	0.00
Hong Kong	2	2	0	0	5	0	+5	100.00
India	1	1	0	0	3	0	+3	100.00
Iran	9	2	5	2	9	8	+1	22.22
Iraq	2	0	0	2	1	3	−2	0.00
Jordan	3	1	1	1	2	3	−1	33.33
Kazakhstan	1	1	0	0	2	0	+2	100.00
Kuwait	1	1	0	0	2	0	+2	100.00
Kyrgyzstan	5	5	0	0	15	4	+11	100.00
Malaysia	1	1	0	0	5	1	+4	100.00
Maldives	1	1	0	0	4	0	+4	100.00
Mexico	1	0	1	0	3	3	0	0.00
Netherlands	1	0	0	1	1	2	−1	0.00
North Korea	2	2	0	0	2	0	+2	100.00
Oman	2	1	1	0	4	1	+3	50.00
Palestine	1	1	0	0	1	0	+1	100.00
Portugal	1	0	0	1	0	5	−5	0.00
Qatar	3	1	1	1	6	4	+2	33.33
Russia	2	0	1	1	2	3	−1	0.00
Saudi Arabia	2	1	0	1	2	4	−2	50.00
Singapore	1	1	0	0	5	0	+5	100.00
South Korea	1	0	0	1	0	2	−2	0.00
South Sudan	1	1	0	0	3	0	+3	100.00
Sri Lanka	1	1	0	0	3	0	+3	100.00
Sweden	1	0	0	1	1	2	−1	0.00
Syria	3	1	1	1	5	3	+2	33.33
Tajikistan	2	2	0	0	7	2	+5	100.00
Thailand	2	2	0	0	4	1	+3	100.00
Turkmenistan	4	4	0	0	10	3	+7	100.00
Uganda	1	1	0	0	4	2	+2	100.00
United Arab Emirates	3	2	1	0	3	1	+2	66.67
Uruguay	1	0	0	1	1	2	−1	0.00
United States	1	0	0	1	0	3	−3	0.00
Venezuela	2	0	2	0	1	1	0	0.00
Vietnam	1	1	0	0	2	0	+2	100.00
Yemen	1	1	0	0	1	0	+1	100.00
Total	79	43	15	21	133	78	+55	54.43

Source: Results

== Results ==
Key
Win
Draw
Defeat

=== 2020 ===
23 February 2020 Friendly	Uzbekistan	0–1	Belarus	Al Hamriyah, United Arab Emirates
18:00 UTC+4		Report	Nyakhaychyk 26'	Stadium: Al Hamriya Sports Club Stadium; Referee: Omar Muhammad Alali (United Arab Emirates)

26 March 2020 Friendly	Uzbekistan	Cancelled	Armenia	Tashkent, Uzbekistan
18:00 UTC+5		Report		Stadium: Milliy Stadium

3 September 2020 Friendly	Uzbekistan	2–1	Tajikistan	Tashkent, Uzbekistan
19:00 UTC+5	Ubaydullaev 33'; Kholmukhamedov 67' (pen.)	Report	Juraboev 48'	Stadium: Lokomotiv Stadium; Attendance: 0 Referee: Akhrol Riskullaev (Uzbekistan)

8 October 2020 Friendly	Uzbekistan	1–2	Iran	Tashkent, Uzbekistan
18:00 UTC+5	Shomurodov 53'	Report	Azmoun 44'; Taremi 51' (pen.)	Stadium: Pakhtakor Central Stadium; Referee: Jaxur Muxtarov (Uzbekistan)

12 October 2020 Friendly	United Arab Emirates	1–2	Uzbekistan	Dubai, United Arab Emirates
18:20 UTC+4	Tagliabué 90+1' (pen.)	Report	Sergeev 48', 86'	Stadium: Rashid Stadium; Attendance: 0 Referee: Ali Abdulnabi (Bahrain)

12 November 2020 Friendly	Syria	1–0	Uzbekistan	Sharjah, United Arab Emirates
20:00 UTC+4	Al-Mawas 48'	Report		Stadium: Sharjah Stadium; Attendance: 0 Referee: Omar Muhammad Al Ali (United Arab Emirates)

17 November 2020 Friendly	Uzbekistan	1–2	Iraq	Dubai, United Arab Emirates
18:00 UTC+4	Khamdamov 39' (pen.)	Report	Ali 64'; Adnan 85' (pen.)	Stadium: The Sevens Stadium; Attendance: 0 Referee: Adel Ali Al Naqbi (United Arab Emirates)

=== 2021 ===
15 February 2021 Friendly	Uzbekistan	2–0	Jordan	Dubai, United Arab Emirates
18:00 UTC+4	Gafurov 69'; Abdukholiqov 81'	Report		Stadium: Theyab Awana Stadium

29 March 2021 Friendly	Uzbekistan	0–1	Iraq	Tashkent, Uzbekistan
18:00 UTC+5		Report	Karim 56'	Stadium: Milliy Stadium; Referee: Nurzat Askat Uulu (Kyrgyzstan)

7 June 2021 2022 WCQ - AFC 2nd round	Uzbekistan	5–0	Singapore	Riyadh, Saudi Arabia
21:00 UTC+3	Masharipov 6', 34'; Shomurodov 45+1'; Akhmedov 50'; Fandi 88' (o.g.)	Report		Stadium: King Fahd International Stadium; Attendance: 75; Referee: Ali Abdulnabi (Bahrain)

11 June 2021 2022 WCQ - AFC 2nd round	Yemen	0–1	Uzbekistan	Riyadh, Saudi Arabia
21:00 UTC+3		Report	Masharipov 19' (pen.)	Stadium: King Fahd International Stadium; Attendance: 230; Referee: Mohammed Abdulla Hassan Mohamed (United Arab Emirates)

15 June 2021 2022 WCQ - AFC 2nd round	Saudi Arabia	3–0	Uzbekistan	Riyadh, Saudi Arabia
21:00 UTC+3	Al-Faraj 25', 33'; Al-Hassan 52'	Report		Stadium: King Saud University Stadium; Attendance: 6,339; Referee: Ko Hyung-jin (South Korea)

5 September 2021 Friendly	Sweden	2–1	Uzbekistan	Solna, Sweden
15:00 UTC+2	Abdullaev 6' (o.g.); Kiese Thelin 35'	Report	Shomurodov 71'	Stadium: Friends Arena; Attendance: 12,974; Referee: Kai Erik Steen (Norway)

9 October 2021 Friendly	Uzbekistan	5–1	Malaysia	Amman, Jordan
18:00 UTC+3	Khamdamov 17', 29'; Norchaev 33'; Yuldashev 68'; Amanov 87'	Report	Bakhtiar 45+1'	Stadium: Amman International Stadium

12 October 2021 Friendly	Jordan	3–0	Uzbekistan	Amman, Jordan
17:00 UTC+3	Faisal 30'; Nasib 56'; Al-Dardour 83'	Report		Stadium: Amman International Stadium

15 November 2021 Friendly	Georgia	1–0	Uzbekistan	Gori, Georgia
18:00 UTC+4	Volkovi 41'	Report		Stadium: Tengiz Burjanadze Stadium; Referee: Vitaliy Romanov (Ukraine)

=== 2022 ===
21 January 2022 Kirin Challenge Cup	Japan	Cancelled	Uzbekistan	Saitama, Japan
19:25 UTC+9		Report		Stadium: Saitama Stadium 2002

27 January 2022 Friendly	Uzbekistan	3–0	South Sudan	Dubai, United Arab Emirates
18:00 UTC+4	Shomurodov 6', 29'; Masharipov 67'	Report		Stadium: The Sevens Stadium; Referee: Mohamed Ahmed Al-Hammadi (United Arab Emirates)

1 February 2022 Friendly	New Zealand	Cancelled	Uzbekistan	Dubai, United Arab Emirates
19:00 UTC+4		Report		Stadium: The Sevens Stadium

25 March 2022 Navruz Cup	Uzbekistan	3–1	Kyrgyzstan	Namangan, Uzbekistan
19:00 UTC+5	Shomurodov 64'; Sergeev 85', 90'	Report	Murzayev 6'	Stadium: Markaziy Stadium; Referee: Nasrullo Kabirov (Tajikistan)

29 March 2022 Navruz Cup	Uzbekistan	4–2	Uganda	Namangan, Uzbekistan
19:00 UTC+5	Masharipov 35'; Shomurodov 39', 56', 72'	Report	Miya 52'; Okwi 78'	Stadium: Markaziy Stadium; Referee: Sayyodjon Nasriddinov (Tajikistan)

8 June 2022 2023 ACQ - 3rd round	Uzbekistan	3–0	Sri Lanka	Namangan, Uzbekistan
20:30 UTC+5	Masharipov 36'; Khamdamov 48'; Sayfiev 61'	Report		Stadium: Markaziy Stadium; Attendance: 12,400; Referee: Thoriq Alkatiri (Indonesia)

11 June 2022 2023 ACQ - 3rd round	Maldives	0–4	Uzbekistan	Namangan, Uzbekistan
20:30 UTC+5		Report	Shomurodov 2', 51', 80'; Urunov 86'	Stadium: Markaziy Stadium; Attendance: 9,066; Referee: Masoud Tufaylieh (Syria)

14 June 2022 2023 ACQ - 3rd round	Uzbekistan	2–0	Thailand	Namangan, Uzbekistan
20:30 UTC+5	Masharipov 8'; Turgunboev 23'	Report		Stadium: Markaziy Stadium; Attendance: 21,405; Referee: Hasan Akrami (Iran)

23 September 2022 Friendly	Cameroon	0–2	Uzbekistan	Goyang, South Korea
15:00 UTC+9		Report	Erkinov 24'; Urunov 76'	Stadium: Goyang Stadium; Referee: Kim Woo-sung (Korea)

27 September 2022 Friendly	Uzbekistan	1–2	Costa Rica	Suwon, South Korea
15:00 UTC+9	Shomurodov 25'	Report	Hernández 90+2'; Waston 90+4'	Stadium: Suwon World Cup Stadium; Referee: Kim Dae-yong (Korea)

16 November 2022 Friendly	Uzbekistan	2–0	Kazakhstan	Tashkent, Uzbekistan
18:00 UTC+5	Erkinov 12'; Shomurodov 45'	Report		Stadium: Pakhtakor Stadium; Attendance: 5,000; Referee: Sergei Karasev (Russia)

20 November 2022 Friendly	Uzbekistan	0–0	Russia	Tashkent, Uzbekistan
17:00 UTC+5		Report		Stadium: Pakhtakor Stadium; Attendance: 14,539; Referee: Daniyar Sakhi (Kazakhstan)

=== 2023 ===
24 March 2023 Friendly	Uzbekistan	1–0	Bolivia	Jeddah, Saudi Arabia
21:00 UTC+3	Shomurodov 36'	Report		Stadium: King Abdullah Sports City; Attendance: 30; Referee: Faisal Al-Balawi (Saudi Arabia)

28 March 2023 Friendly	Uzbekistan	1–1	Venezuela	Jeddah, Saudi Arabia
21:00 UTC+3	Yakhshiboev 78' (pen.)	Report	González 6'	Stadium: King Abdullah Sports City; Referee: Khaled Saleh Al-Turais (Saudi Arabia)

11 June 2023 2023 CAFA Nations Cup	Uzbekistan	3–0	Oman	Tashkent, Uzbekistan
20:30 UTC+5	Masharipov 7', 24'; Alijonov 89'	Report		Stadium: Milliy Stadium; Attendance: 12,912; Referee: Dayirbek Abdilaev (Kyrgyzstan)

14 June 2023 2023 CAFA Nations Cup	Turkmenistan	0–2	Uzbekistan	Tashkent, Uzbekistan
20:30 UTC+5		Report	Shomurodov 52', 86'	Stadium: Milliy Stadium; Attendance: 14,410; Referee: Nurzatbek Abdykadyrov (Kyrgyzstan)

17 June 2023 2023 CAFA Nations Cup	Uzbekistan	5–1	Tajikistan	Tashkent, Uzbekistan
20:30 UTC+5	Yakhshiboev 53'; Shomurodov 56' (pen.); Fayzullaev 73'; Erkinov 83'; Urunov 90+6' (pen.)	Report	Umarbayev 13'	Stadium: Milliy Stadium; Attendance: 9,099; Referee: Hassan Akrami (Iran)

20 June 2023 2023 CAFA Nations Cup F	Uzbekistan	0–1	Iran	Tashkent, Uzbekistan
20:30 UTC+5		Report	Azmoun 48'	Stadium: Milliy Stadium; Attendance: 34,000; Referee: Kirill Levnikov (Russia)

9 September 2023 Friendly	United States	3–0	Uzbekistan	St. Louis, United States
17:30 UTC−5	Weah 4'; Pepi 90+1'; Pulisic 90+5' (pen.)	Report		Stadium: CityPark; Attendance: 15,569; Referee: Nelson Salgado (Honduras)

12 September 2023 Friendly	Mexico	3–3	Uzbekistan	Atlanta, United States
19:30 UTC−4	Jiménez 21', 81'; Antuna 88'	Report	Abdikholikov 18'; Turgunboev 45+1'; Shukurov 90+2'	Stadium: Mercedes-Benz Stadium; Attendance: 33,817; Referee: Victor Rivas (United States)

13 October 2023 Friendly	Vietnam	0–2	Uzbekistan	Dalian, China
20:35 UTC+8		Report	Urunov 27'; Aliqulov 66'	Stadium: Dalian Sports Centre Stadium; Referee: Zhang Lei (China)

16 October 2023 Friendly	China	1–2	Uzbekistan	Dalian, China
19:35 UTC+8	Wei Shihao 41'	Report	Shukurov 78'; Iskanderov 86'	Stadium: Dalian Sports Centre Stadium; Attendance: 12,868; Referee: Tam Ping Wun (Hong Kong)

16 November 2023 2026 WCQ / 2027 ACQ	Turkmenistan	1–3	Uzbekistan	Ashgabat, Turkmenistan
19:00 UTC+5	Meylis Durdyyev 44'	Report	Shukurov 57', 77'; Shomurodov 90+1'	Stadium: Ashgabat Stadium; Attendance: 19,500; Referee: Hiroyuki Kimura (Japan)

21 November 2023 2026 WCQ / 2027 ACQ	Uzbekistan	2–2	Iran	Tashkent, Uzbekistan
18:00 UTC+5	Urunov 52'; Sergeev 83'	Report	Rezaeian 14'; Taremi 38'	Stadium: Milliy Stadium; Attendance: 32,551; Referee: Mohammed Abdulla Hassan Mohamed (United Arab Emirates)

25 December 2023 Friendly	Kyrgyzstan	1–4	Uzbekistan	Dubai, United Arab Emirates
19:30 UTC+4	Duyshobekov 89'	Report	Fayzullaev 23'; Amonov 53'; Masharipov 55'; Gaybullaev 80'	Stadium: Al Maktoum Stadium

=== 2024 ===
7 January 2024 Friendly	Palestine	0–1	Uzbekistan	Doha, Qatar
17:00 UTC+3		Report	Abdikholikov 79'	Stadium: Hamad bin Khalifa Stadium

13 January 2024 2023 AFC Asian Cup GS	Uzbekistan	0–0	Syria	Al Rayyan, Qatar
20:30 UTC+3		Report		Stadium: Jassim bin Hamad Stadium; Attendance: 10,198; Referee: Ahmed Al-Kaf (Oman)

18 January 2024 2023 AFC Asian Cup GS	India	0–3	Uzbekistan	Al Rayyan, Qatar
17:30 UTC+3		Report	Fayzullaev 4'; Sergeev 18'; Nasrullev 45+4'	Stadium: Ahmed bin Ali Stadium; Attendance: 38,491; Referee: Fu Ming (China)

23 January 2024 2023 AFC Asian Cup GS	Australia	1–1	Uzbekistan	Al Wakrah, Qatar
14:30 UTC+3	Boyle 45+1' (pen.)	Report	Turgunboev 78'	Stadium: Al Janoub Stadium; Attendance: 15,290; Referee: Yusuke Araki (Japan)

30 January 2024 2023 AFC Asian Cup R16	Uzbekistan	2–1	Thailand	Al Wakrah, Qatar
14:30 UTC+3	Turgunboev 37'; Fayzullaev 65'	Report	Supachok 58'	Stadium: Al Janoub Stadium; Attendance: 18,691; Referee: Nazmi Nasaruddin (Malaysia)

3 February 2024 2023 AFC Asian Cup QF	Qatar	1–1 (a.e.t.) (3–2 p)	Uzbekistan	Al Khor, Qatar
18:30 UTC+3	Al-Haydos 27'	Report	Hamrobekov 59'	Stadium: Al Bayt Stadium; Attendance: 58,791; Referee: Kim Hee-gon (South Korea)
	Penalties
	Afif (penalty scored); Almoez (penalty missed); Ali Mukhtar (penalty missed); Al-Brake (penalty scored); Ró-Ró (penalty scored)		(penalty scored) Shukurov; (penalty missed) Ashurmatov; (penalty scored) Umarov; (penalty missed) Abdurakhmatov; (penalty missed) Masharipov

21 March 2024 2026 WCQ / 2027 ACQ	Hong Kong	0–2	Uzbekistan	Mong Kok, Hong Kong
20:00 UTC+8		Report	Shomurodov 49'; Ashurmatov 65'	Stadium: Mong Kok Stadium; Attendance: 6,263; Referee: Kim Woo-sung (South Korea)

26 March 2024 2026 WCQ / 2027 ACQ	Uzbekistan	3–0	Hong Kong	Tashkent, Uzbekistan
19:30 UTC+5	Shomurodov 20'; Erkinov 63'; Urunov 70'	Report		Stadium: Milliy Stadium; Attendance: 29,584; Referee: Ahmed Faisal Al-Ali (Jordan)

6 June 2024 2026 WCQ / 2027 ACQ	Uzbekistan	3–1	Turkmenistan	Tashkent, Uzbekistan
19:30 UTC+5	Aliqulov 17'; Urunov 29'; Nasrullaev 70'	Report	Tirkişow 25'	Stadium: Milliy Stadium; Attendance: 27,306; Referee: Yusuke Araki (Japan)

11 June 2024 2026 WCQ / 2027 ACQ	Iran	0–0	Uzbekistan	Tehran, Iran
20:30 UTC+3:30		Report		Stadium: Azadi Stadium; Attendance: 15,403; Referee: Kim Jong-hyeok (South Korea)

5 September 2024 2026 WCQ - 3rd round	Uzbekistan	1–0	North Korea	Tashkent, Uzbekistan
19:00 UTC+5	Masharipov 20'	Report		Stadium: Milliy Stadium; Attendance: 24,205; Referee: Ahmed Al-Kaf (Oman)

10 September 2024 2026 WCQ - 3rd round	Kyrgyzstan	2–3	Uzbekistan	Bishkek, Kyrgyzstan
20:00 UTC+6	Kojo 15'; Abdurakhmanov 35'	Report	Shomurodov 17'; Aliqulov 45'; Urunov 72'	Stadium: Dolen Omurzakov Stadium; Attendance: 13,282; Referee: Ahmed Al-Alili (Kuwait)

10 October 2024 2026 WCQ - 3rd round	Uzbekistan	0–0	Iran	Tashkent, Uzbekistan
19:00 UTC+5		Report		Stadium: Milliy Stadium; Attendance: 33,829; Referee: Shaun Evans (Australia)

15 October 2024 2026 WCQ - 3rd round	Uzbekistan	1–0	United Arab Emirates	Tashkent, Uzbekistan
19:00 UTC+5	Shukurov 76' (pen.)	Report		Stadium: Milliy Stadium; Attendance: 32,773; Referee: Ma Ning (China)

14 November 2024 2026 WCQ - 3rd round	Qatar	3–2	Uzbekistan	Al Rayyan, Qatar
19:15 UTC+3	Ali 25', 41'; Mendes 90+12'	Report	Fayzullaev 75', 80'	Stadium: Jassim bin Hamad Stadium; Attendance: 10,759; Referee: Kim Jong-hyeok (South Korea)

19 November 2024 2026 WCQ - 3rd round	North Korea	0–1	Uzbekistan	Vientiane, Laos
19:00 UTC+7		Report	Fayzullaev 44'	Stadium: New Laos National Stadium; Attendance: 166; Referee: Ahmed Al-Ali (Kuwait)

=== 2025 ===
27 January 2025 Friendly	Uzbekistan	0–0	Jordan	Doha, Qatar
20:00 UTC+3		Report		Stadium: Abdullah bin Khalifa Stadium

20 March 2025 2026 WCQ - 3rd round	Uzbekistan	1–0	Kyrgyzstan	Tashkent, Uzbekistan
21:00 UTC+5	Alijonov 40'	Report		Stadium: Milliy Stadium; Attendance: 32,458; Referee: Yusuke Araki (Japan)

25 March 2025 2026 WCQ - 3rd round	Iran	2–2	Uzbekistan	Tehran, Iran
19:30 UTC+3:30	Taremi 52', 83'	Report	Erkinov 16'; Fayzullaev 53'	Stadium: Azadi Stadium; Attendance: 36,702; Referee: Ahmed Al-Kaf (Oman)

5 June 2025 2026 WCQ - 3rd round	United Arab Emirates	0–0	Uzbekistan	Abu Dhabi, United Arab Emirates
20:00 UTC+4		Report		Stadium: Al Nahyan Stadium; Attendance: 9,820; Referee: Shaun Evans (Australia)

10 June 2025 2026 WCQ - 3rd round	Uzbekistan	3–0	Qatar	Tashkent, Uzbekistan
18:45 UTC+5	Turgunboev 28'; Shomurodov 86'; Sergeev 90+2'	Report		Stadium: Milliy Stadium; Attendance: 32,931; Referee: Ma Ning (China)

30 August 2025 2025 CAFA Nations Cup GS	Uzbekistan	1–1	Oman	Tashkent, Uzbekistan
19:30 UTC+5	Erkinov 55'	Report	Al-Rawahi 4'	Stadium: Olympic City Stadium; Referee: Mooud Bonyadifard (Iran)

2 September 2025 2025 CAFA Nations Cup GS	Turkmenistan	1–2	Uzbekistan	Tashkent, Uzbekistan
19:30 UTC+5	Durdyýew 84' (pen.)	Report	Sergeev 37', 44' (pen.)	Stadium: Olympic City Stadium; Attendance: 2,037; Referee: Abdullo Davlatov (Tajikistan)

5 September 2025 2025 CAFA Nations Cup GS	Uzbekistan	4–0	Kyrgyzstan	Tashkent, Uzbekistan
19:30 UTC+5	Mozgovoy 20'; Shukurov 67' (pen.); Sergeev 82'; Turgunboev 90+3'	Report		Stadium: Olympic City Stadium; Referee: Sadullo Gulmurodi (Tajikistan)

8 September 2025 2025 CAFA Nations Cup F	Uzbekistan	1–0 (a.e.t.)	Iran	Tashkent, Uzbekistan
19:30 UTC+5	Alijonov 120'	Report		Stadium: Olympic City Stadium; Attendance: 11,482; Referee: Nurzatbek Abdıkadırov (Kyrgyzstan)

9 October 2025 Friendly	Uzbekistan	2–0	Kuwait	Tashkent, Uzbekistan
18:00 UTC+5	Shomurodov 10'; Erkinov 19'	Report		Stadium: Olympic City Stadium; Referee: Mederbek Taichiev (Kyrgyzstan)

13 October 2025 Friendly	Uzbekistan	1–2	Uruguay	Malacca City, Malaysia
20:45 UTC+8	Jiyanov 82'	Report	Torres 51'; Sanabria 60'	Stadium: Hang Jebat Stadium; Referee: Muhammad Kamaruzaman (Malaysia)

14 November 2025 2025 Al Ain International Cup	Uzbekistan	2–0	Egypt	Al Ain, United Arab Emirates
20:00 UTC+4	Urunov 4', 43'	Report		Stadium: Hazza bin Zayed Stadium; Attendance: 6,200; Referee: Ahmed Eisa Mohamed Darwish (United Arab Emirates)

18 November 2025 2025 Al Ain International Cup	Iran	0–0 (3–4 p)	Uzbekistan	Al Ain, United Arab Emirates
20:00 UTC+4		Report		Stadium: Hazza bin Zayed Stadium; Attendance: 4,700; Referee: Ali Saeed Al-Naqbi (United Arab Emirates)
	Penalties
	Noorafkan (penalty scored); Ghorbani (penalty scored); Mohebi (penalty missed); Hosseini (penalty scored); Mohammadi (penalty missed)		(penalty scored) Shomurodov; (penalty missed) Iskanderov; (penalty scored) Abdullaev; (penalty scored) Ashurmatov; (penalty scored) Mozgovoy

=== 2026 ===
27 March 2026 2026 FIFA Series	Uzbekistan	3–1	Gabon	Tashkent, Uzbekistan
19:00 UTC+5	Shomurodov 14'; Urozov 59'; Odilov 90+4'	Report	Averlant 6'	Stadium: Milliy Stadium; Attendance: 28,840; Referee: Abdullo Davlatov (Tajikistan)

30 March 2026 2026 FIFA Series	Uzbekistan	0–0 (5–4 p)	Venezuela	Tashkent, Uzbekistan
19:00 UTC+5		Report		Stadium: Milliy Stadium; Attendance: 29,225; Referee: Mederbek Taichiev (Kyrgyzstan)
	Penalties
	Iskanderov (penalty scored); Temirov (penalty scored); Ashurmatov (penalty scored); Shukurov (penalty scored); Mozgovoy (penalty scored)		(penalty scored) Rondón; (penalty scored) González; (penalty missed) Sosa; (penalty scored) Quintero; (penalty scored) Segovia

1 June 2026 Friendly	Canada	2–0	Uzbekistan	Edmonton, Canada
19:00 UTC−6	Osorio 58'; Nelson 90+1'	Report		Stadium: Commonwealth Stadium; Attendance: 46,164; Referee: Marco Ortíz (Mexico)

8 June 2026 Friendly	Netherlands	2–1	Uzbekistan	New York, United States
14:45 UTC−4	Gakpo 32' (pen.), 90+7' (pen.)	Report	Sergeev 90+2'	Stadium: Icahn Stadium; Attendance: 0 (BCD); Referee: Alyssa Pennington (United States)

17 June 2026 2026 World Cup GS	Uzbekistan	1–3	Colombia	Mexico City, Mexico
20:00 UTC−6	Fayzullaev 60'	Report	Muñoz 40'; Díaz 65'; Campaz 90+9'	Stadium: Estadio Azteca; Attendance: 80,824; Referee: Anthony Taylor (England)

23 June 2026 2026 World Cup GS	Portugal	5–0	Uzbekistan	Houston, United States
12:00 UTC−5	Ronaldo 6', 39'; Mendes 17'; Nematov 60' (o.g.); Leão 87'	Report		Stadium: NRG Stadium; Attendance: 68,777; Referee: Jalal Jayed (Morocco)

27 June 2026 2026 World Cup GS	DR Congo	3–1	Uzbekistan	Atlanta, United States
19:30 UTC−4	Wissa 68' (pen.), 90+1'; Mayele 78'	Report	Shomurodov 10'	Stadium: Mercedes-Benz Stadium; Attendance: 68,239; Referee: Felix Zwayer (Germany)

24 September 2026 Friendly	Uzbekistan	3–1	Iran	Fergana, Uzbekistan
19:00 UTC+5	Shomurodov 10', 58' (pen.); Norchaev 90+4'	Report	Urozov 49' (o.g.)	Stadium: Istiqlol Stadium; Attendance: 17,978; Referee: Kirill Levnikov (Russia)

1 October 2026 Friendly	Uzbekistan	4–1	Syria	Tashkent, Uzbekistan
19:00 UTC+5	Esanov 27'; Mozgovoy 45'; Norchaev 48', 90'	Report	Khakimov 90+2' (o.g.)	Stadium: Pakhtakor Central Stadium; Referee: Sayyodjon Zayniddinov (Tajikistan)

6 October 2026 Friendly	South Korea	2–0	Uzbekistan	Yongin, South Korea
20:00 UTC+9	Son Heung-min 6'; Oh Se-hun 60'	Report		Stadium: Yongin Mireu Stadium; Attendance: 24,587; Referee: Alex King (Australia)

12 November 2026 Friendly	Uzbekistan	2–3	Russia	Tashkent, Uzbekistan
20:00 UTC+5	Melyokhin 5' (o.g.); Karimov 46'	Report	Komlichenko 70', 75'; Al. Miranchuk 79'	Stadium: Pakhtakor Central Stadium; Attendance: 9,815; Referee: Sadullo Gulmurodi (Tajikistan)

17 November 2026 Friendly	Saudi Arabia	1–2	Uzbekistan	Doha, Qatar
18:30 UTC+3	Al-Buraikan 23'	Report	Esanov 19', 35'	Stadium: Jassim bin Hamad Stadium; Referee: Mohamed Al-Sherif (Qatar)

== See also ==
- Uzbekistan national football team
- Uzbekistan national football team results (1992–99)
- Uzbekistan national football team results (2000–09)
- Uzbekistan national football team results (2010–19)
- Uzbekistan national football team results – B Matches
