= 2022 Uzbekistan Cup final =

- Event: 2022 Uzbekistan Cup
Navbahor	Nasaf
1	2
- Report
- Date: 30 October 2022; 3 years ago
- Venue: Buxoro Arena, Bukhara
- Man of the Match: Mateus Lima
- Referee: Vadim Agishev (Uzbekistan)
- Attendance: 11127
- Weather: Cloudy

2022 Uzbekistan Cup final (in Uzbek: Футбол бўйича 2022-йилги Ўзбекистон Кубоги финали) was the 30th final match of Uzbekistan Cup.

On March 22, the draw for the final match of the Coca-Cola Cup of Uzbekistan was held at the Bukhara Stadium. The final was held on October 30, 2022. Played between Nasaf and Navbahor. In the 29th minute of the match, a goal scored by Nasaf player Akmal Mozgovoy opened the scoring. In the 57th minute of the match, Navbahor player Doniyor Abdumannopov equalized the score. The regular time ended with a score of 1:1, and the teams played in extra time. A goal scored by Mateus Lima in the 100th minute of extra time put Nasaf club ahead and Nasaf became the winner of 2022 Uzbekistan Cup.

== Squads ==
Navbahor	Nasaf

GK	1	(Uzbekistan) Oʻtkir Yusupov
MF	4	(Serbia) Bojan Ciger
MF	6	(Uzbekistan) Rustam Ashurmatov
MF	10	(Uzbekistan) Jamshid Iskanderov (c)
DF	14	(Uzbekistan) Jamshid Boltaboev
DF	20	(Uzbekistan) Doniyor Abdumannopov
MF	22	(Russia) Igor Golban
FW	23	(Serbia) Jovan Đokić
DF	24	(Uzbekistan) Davron Khashimov
DF	32	(Serbia) Zoran Marušić
FW	77	(Uzbekistan) Asadbek Sobirjonov
Substitutions:
GK	35	(Uzbekistan) Rahimjon Davronov
DF	7	(Uzbekistan) Azim Ahmedov
FW	9	(Uzbekistan) Vladimir Kozak
FW	19	(Uzbekistan) Nurillo Tukhtasinov
DF	30	(Ukraine) Oleksandr Kasyan
FW	55	(Uzbekistan) Asadbek Joʻraboyev
Coach:
(Uzbekistan) Samvel Babayan

GK	35	(Uzbekistan) Abduvohid Nematov
DF	2	(Uzbekistan) Alibek Davronov
MF	4	(Uzbekistan) Husniddin Aliqulov
FW	5	(Uzbekistan) Golib Gaybullaev
MF	7	(Uzbekistan) Sharof Mukhiddinov
MF	8	(Uzbekistan) Dilshod Saitov
DF	19	(Brazil) Mateus Lima
MF	22	(Uzbekistan) Akmal Mozgovoy
DF	77	(Uzbekistan) Oybek Bozorov (c)
DF	88	(Serbia) Marko Stanojević
FW	92	(Uzbekistan) Umar Eshmurodov
Substitutions:
GK	1	(Uzbekistan) Umidjon Ergashev
DF	6	(Uzbekistan) Murodbek Rahmatov
FW	9	(Russia) Ivan Solovyov
MF	14	(Serbia) Alen Mašović
DF	17	(Uzbekistan) Suhrob Nurulloyev
FW	20	(Uzbekistan) Shahzod Akromov
DF	27	(Uzbekistan) Zafarmurod Abdurakhmatov
Coach:
(Uzbekistan) Ruzikul Berdiev
