= 2021 Uzbekistan Cup final =

- Event: 2021 Uzbekistan Cup
| Pakhtakor | Nasaf |
| 1 | 2 |
- Report
- Date: 4 December 2021; 4 years ago
- Venue: Dinamo, Samarkand
- Man of the Match: Golib Gaybullaev
- Referee: Ahrol Risqullayev (Uzbekistan)
- Attendance: 11127
- Weather: Cloudy

2021 Uzbekistan Cup final (in Uzbek: Футбол бўйича 2021-йилги Ўзбекистон Кубоги финали) was the 29th final match of Uzbekistan Cup.

On March 18, the draw for the final match of the Coca-Cola Cup of Uzbekistan was held at the Dinamo Stadium in Samarkand.

On November 24, Nasaf defeated AGMK to reach the final. On the same day, Pakhtakor and Bunyodkor drew 1–1, and Pakhtakor won 5–4 on penalties to advance to the final.

The final was held on December 4 between Nasaf and Pakhtakor. Nasaf wins Uzbekistan Cup first time in its history.

== Squads ==
Paxtakor: 25. Eldorbek Suyunov, 3. Khojiakbar Alijonov, 5. Anzur Ismailov, 7. Odiljon Hamrobekov, 9.Sherzod Temirov, 17. Dostonbek Khamdamov, 18. Khojimat Erkinov, 27. Sardor Sabirkhodjaev, 34. Farrukh Sayfiev, 42. Abbosbek Fayzullaev (11. Bojan Matić, 68), 88. Shahzod Azmiddinov (16. Marlen Chobanov, 46)

35. Sanjar Kuvvatov, 8. Azizbek Turgunboev, 14. Khumoyunmirzo Iminov, 19. Sharof Mukhiddinov, 21. Abror Ismoilov, 28. Diyor Kholmatov, 58. Abubakir Ashurov

Nasaf: 1. Umidjon Ergashev, 5. Golib Gaybullaev, 8.Dilshod Saitov, 18.Bahrom Abdurahimov (55. Shahzod Akromov, 61), 19.Khusayin Norchaev, 20. Suhrob Nurulloyev, 22.Akmal Mozgovoy, 34.Sherzod Nasrullaev, 70.Abubakrrizo Turdialiyev (6. Murodbek Rahmatov, 61), 77.Oybek Bozorov, 92.Umar Eshmurodov

13. Azamat Soyibov, 75. Shahzod Akromov, 2. Alibek Davronov, 28. Sardor Saʼdullayev, 50. Shohmalik Komilov, 71. Jasur Jumayev, 99. Andrija Kaluđerović
