= 2023 Uzbekistan Cup final =

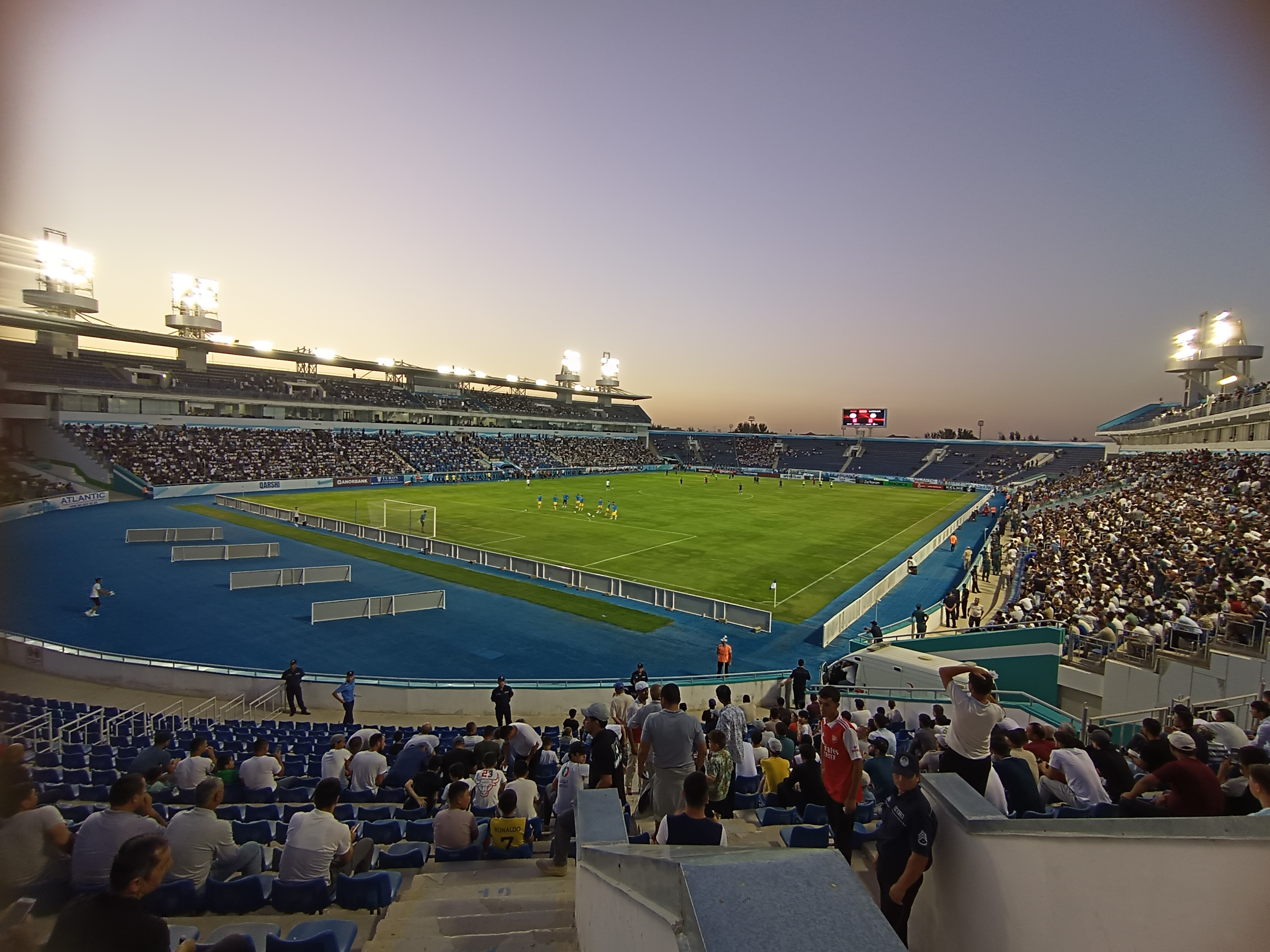
- Event: 2023 Uzbekistan Cup
Nasaf	AGMK
1	0
- Report
- Date: 12 November 2023; 2 years ago
- Venue: Markaziy, Qarshi
- Man of the Match: Javokhir Sidikov
- Referee: Aziz Asimov (Uzbekistan)
- Attendance: 17710
- Weather: Sunny

2023 Uzbekistan Cup final (in Uzbek: Футбол бўйича 2023-йилги Ўзбекистон Кубоги финали) was the 31st final match of Uzbekistan Cup.

AGMK defeated "Gijduvon", "Andijan-SGS" and "Jizzakh" in the group stage before the final. In quarter-finals, they defeated "Lokomotiv" with a score of 2:1, and in quarter-finals, they defeated "Khorazm" with a score of 4:2. In the semi-final match against "Navbahor" a draw was recorded in normal time. They won the penalty shootout after the match. AGMK has scored 17 goals and conceded 7 goals in cup matches this season.

Nasaf also played in 6 matches before the final. In the group stage, defeated "Kokand 1912", "Surkhon" and "Mash'al" 1:0 to advance to the play-offs. They defeated "Bukhara" and "Turon" in the quarter-finals. They defeated "Dinamo" in the semi-finals and advanced to the final. "Nasaf" scored 11 goals and conceded 5 goals in this competition.

== Squads ==
Nasaf F.C.	F.C. OKMK

GK	35	(Uzbekistan) Abduvohid Nematov		(yellow card) 90+6'
DF	2	(Uzbekistan) Alibek Davronov
DF	5	(Uzbekistan) Golib Gaybullaev (c)		(yellow card) 74'
MF	7	(Uzbekistan) Akmal Mozgovoy
DF	8	(Uzbekistan) Zafarmurod Abdurakhmatov
MF	9	(Uzbekistan) Javokhir Sidikov	70'	(yellow card) 80'	(substituted off) 80'
MF	17	(Uzbekistan) Suhrob Nurulloyev		(yellow card) 55'	(substituted off) 60'
FW	19	(Uzbekistan) Mateus Lima		(yellow card) 90+4'	(substituted off) 90+5'
DF	34	(Uzbekistan) Sherzod Nasrullaev
MF	77	(Uzbekistan) Oybek Bozorov			(substituted off) 90+5'
MF	88	(Uzbekistan) Marko Stanojević			(substituted off) 60'
Substitutions:
GK	1	(Uzbekistan) Umidjon Ergashev
FW	10	(Uzbekistan) Andrés Chávez			(substituted on) 90+5'
MF	18	(Uzbekistan) Bahrom Abdurahimov			(substituted on) 60'
FW	21	(Uzbekistan) Doniyor Narzullayev			(substituted on) 90+5'
DF	25	(Uzbekistan) Bekjon Rakhmonov
DF	28	(Uzbekistan) Shukhrat Mukhammadiev
DF	32	(Uzbekistan) Zafar Hakimov
MF	70	(Uzbekistan) Jaba Jighauri			(substituted on) 80'
FW	99	(Uzbekistan) Azizbek Amonov			(substituted on) 60'
Coach:
(Uzbekistan) Ruziqul Berdiev

GK	1	(Uzbekistan) Botirali Ergashev
DF	2	(Uzbekistan) Akramjon Komilov
DF	3	(Uzbekistan) Sardor Rahmonov
MF	4	(Uzbekistan) Mirjamol Qosimov		(substituted off) 87'
MF	7	(Uzbekistan) Dilshod Ahmadaliyev
MF	10	(Uzbekistan) Khurshid Giyosov		(substituted off) 80'
MF	15	(Uzbekistan) Oybek Rustamov
MF	17	(Uzbekistan) Sanzhar Tursunov (c)	(yellow card) 77'	(substituted off) 80'
DF	20	(Uzbekistan) Islom Tukhtakhujaev	(yellow card) 62'
FW	27	(Uzbekistan) Martin Boakye	Booked
DF	29	(Uzbekistan) Vitaliy Denisov		(substituted off) 87'
Substitutions:
GK	12	(Uzbekistan) Dilshod Yakubov
GK	25	(Uzbekistan) Valijon Rakhimov
DF	19	(Uzbekistan) Muhammadanas Hasanov		(substituted on) 80'
DF	23	(Uzbekistan) Iskandar Businov
MF	24	(Uzbekistan) Murat Ermatov		(substituted on) 87'
FW	38	(Uzbekistan) Sirojiddin Bashriddinov
FW	39	(Uzbekistan) Asilbek Umurzoqov		(substituted on) 87'
FW	40	(Uzbekistan) Jahongir Fozilov
FW	88	(Uzbekistan) Siavash Haghnazari		(substituted on) 80'
Coach:
(Uzbekistan) Mirjalol Qosimov

12 November 2023
17:00 UZT

Nasaf F. C.	1–0	F.C OKMK
Javokhir Sidikov 70'	Report

Markaziy, Qarshi
Attendance: 17,710
Referee: Aziz Asimov (Uzbekistan)
