= 2026 FIFA World Cup Group K =

FIFA World Cup group

Group K of the 2026 FIFA World Cup took place from June 17 to 27, 2026. The group consisted of Portugal, DR Congo, Uzbekistan, and Colombia.

Colombia secured their advancement to the round of 32. after two group game wins, and would top the group after earning a draw against Portugal. Portugal also advanced as group runners-up, after a crucial victory against Uzbekistan.

Although DR Congo failed to win their first two matches, a victory over Uzbekistan allowed them to finish third in the group and advance as one of the best third-place teams. Uzbekistan finished fourth and were eliminated, losing all three of their group games.

== Teams ==
| Draw position | Team | Pot | Confederation | Method of qualification | Date of qualification | Finals appearance | Last appearance | Previous best performance | FIFA Rankings | |
| Draw position | Team | Pot | Confederation | Method of qualification | Date of qualification | Finals appearance | Last appearance | Previous best performance | November 2025 (Note: The rankings of November 2025 were used for seeding for the final draw.) | June 2026 |
|---|---|---|---|---|---|---|---|---|---|---|
| K1 | Portugal | 1 | UEFA | UEFA Group F winner | November 16, 2025 | 9th | 2022 | Third place (1966) | 6 | 5 |
| K2 | DR Congo | 4 (Note: As the identity of the inter-confederation playoff Path 1 winner was not known at the time of the final draw, positions in the FIFA Rankings were not taken into account, and the placeholder in the draw was automatically seeded into pot 4.) | CAF | Inter-confederation playoff Path 1 winner | March 31, 2026 | 2nd | 1974 | Group stage (1974) | 56 | 46 |
| K3 | Uzbekistan | 3 | AFC | AFC third round Group A runner-up | June 5, 2025 | 1st | — | — | 50 | 50 |
| K4 | Colombia | 2 | CONMEBOL | CONMEBOL round robin third place | September 4, 2025 | 7th | 2018 | Quarterfinals (2014) | 13 | 13 |

== Standings ==
| Pos | Team | Pld | W | D | L | GF | GA | GD | Pts | Qualification |
|---|---|---|---|---|---|---|---|---|---|---|
| 1 | Colombia | 3 | 2 | 1 | 0 | 4 | 1 | +3 | 7 | Advance to knockout stage |
| 2 | Portugal | 3 | 1 | 2 | 0 | 6 | 1 | +5 | 5 | Advance to knockout stage |
| 3 | DR Congo | 3 | 1 | 1 | 1 | 4 | 3 | +1 | 4 | Advance to knockout stage |
| 4 | Uzbekistan | 3 | 0 | 0 | 3 | 2 | 11 | −9 | 0 | |

Source: FIFA
Rules for classification: Group stage tiebreakers

In the round of 32:

- The winner of Group K, Colombia, advanced to play the third-place team of Group L, Ghana.
- The runner-up of Group K, Portugal, advanced to play the runner-up of Group L, Croatia.
- The third-place team of Group K, DR Congo, advanced to play the winner of Group L, England, as one of the eight best third-place teams from the group stage.

== Matches ==
All times listed are local.

=== Portugal vs DR Congo ===
The two teams had never met before.

This match marked the country's first time competing under the name DR Congo, having previously appeared as Zaire in 1974. It was also the first World Cup match to be played within the vicinity of a tropical cyclone (Tropical Storm Arthur), but it was unaffected.

Portugal captain Cristiano Ronaldo matched Argentina's Lionel Messi by playing in a sixth World Cup finals, and also become the oldest outfield player to start a World Cup match at the age of 41 years and 132 days.

Portugal went in front in the 6th minute when João Neves headed to the right corner after a cross from the left by Pedro Neto. In time added on in the first half, it was 1–1 when Yoane Wissa headed to the left of the net from six yards out after a cross from the right by Arthur Masuaku, the goal was DR Congo's first-ever World Cup final's goal.

June 17, 2026
12:00 p.m. UTC−5

| Portugal | 1–1 | DR Congo |
|---|---|---|
| J. Neves 6' | (Note: "Portugal vs Congo DR | First Stage | FIFA World Cup 2026". FIFA. Retrieved June 17, 2026.; "Match Report – Group K – Portugal v. Congo DR". FIFA. June 17, 2026. Retrieved June 17, 2026.; "Post match summary report – Group K – Portugal v. Congo DR". FIFA. June 17, 2026. Retrieved June 19, 2026.) | Wissa 45+5' |

NRG Stadium, Houston
Attendance: 68,777
Referee: Abdulrahman Al-Jassim (Qatar)

| Portugal | DR Congo |

| GK | 1 | Diogo Costa |
| RB | 20 | João Cancelo |
| CB | 4 | Tomás Araújo | (yellow card) 90+2' |
| CB | 13 | Renato Veiga |
| LB | 25 | Nuno Mendes | | (substituted off) 72' |
| CM | 15 | João Neves |
| CM | 23 | Vitinha | | (substituted off) 83' |
| RW | 10 | Bernardo Silva | (yellow card) 13' | (substituted off) 46' |
| AM | 8 | Bruno Fernandes |
| LW | 18 | Pedro Neto | | (substituted off) 72' |
| CF | 7 | Cristiano Ronaldo (c) |
Substitutions:
| FW | 26 | Francisco Conceição | | (substituted on) 46' |
| FW | 17 | Rafael Leão | | (substituted on) 72' |
| DF | 2 | Nélson Semedo | (yellow card) 88' | (substituted on) 72' |
| FW | 9 | Gonçalo Ramos | | (substituted on) 83' |
Manager:
(Spain) Roberto Martínez

| GK | 1 | Lionel Mpasi |
| CB | 22 | Chancel Mbemba (c) | (yellow card) 32' |
| CB | 4 | Axel Tuanzebe |
| CB | 3 | Steve Kapuadi |
| RWB | 2 | Aaron Wan-Bissaka | | (substituted off) 85' |
| LWB | 26 | Arthur Masuaku | | (substituted off) 74' |
| CM | 6 | Ngal'ayel Mukau | | (substituted off) 57' |
| CM | 8 | Samuel Moutoussamy |
| CM | 25 | Edo Kayembe | | (substituted off) 74' |
| CF | 17 | Cédric Bakambu | | (substituted off) 85' |
| CF | 20 | Yoane Wissa |
Substitutions:
| MF | 14 | Noah Sadiki | | (substituted on) 57' |
| MF | 18 | Charles Pickel | | (substituted on) 74' |
| DF | 12 | Joris Kayembe | | (substituted on) 74' |
| DF | 24 | Gédéon Kalulu | | (substituted on) 85' |
| FW | 23 | Simon Banza | | (substituted on) 85' |
Manager:
(France) Sébastien Desabre

Man of the Match:
João Neves (Portugal)

Assistant referees:
Taleb Al-Marri (Qatar)
Saud Al-Maqaleh (Qatar)
Fourth official:
Abongile Tom (South Africa)
Reserve assistant referee:
Zakhele Siwela (South Africa)
Video assistant referee:
Khamis Al-Marri (Qatar)
Assistant video assistant referee:
Juan Soto (Venezuela)
Support video assistant referee:
Hernán Mastrángelo (Argentina)

=== Uzbekistan vs Colombia ===
The two teams had never met before. It was the first time since May 12, 2002 that Colombia returned to the pitch of the Azteca having lost a friendly match there to Mexico 2–1. The fixture marked Uzbekistan's debut at the FIFA World Cup.

In the 40th minute, Daniel Muñoz put Colombia in front when he scored with a volley from six yards out, connecting with a pass over the top from Luis Díaz. Abbosbek Fayzullaev made it 1–1 in the 60th minute when he headed into an empty net from close range after Colombian goalkeeper had parried a shot from Eldor Shomurodov on the right. The goal was Uzbekistan's first-ever goal at a World Cup finals. Colombia went back in front five minutes later when Luis Díaz scored with a low finish to the right corner. In the 9th minute of added time, substitute Jaminton Campaz made it 3–1 when he headed to the left corner of the net from six yards out after a cross from Cucho Hernández on the right.

Abdukodir Khusanov received a yellow card for a tackle on Luis Díaz that caused him to collide with a pitch-side camera operator. The match was briefly paused while medical staff attended to the cameraman, who was taken to the hospital but escaped serious injury. Following the match, Khusanov sent a signed match jersey with a written apology to the operator.

June 17, 2026
8:00 p.m. UTC−6

| Uzbekistan | 1–3 | Colombia |
|---|---|---|
| Fayzullaev 60' | (Note: "Uzbekistan vs Colombia | First Stage | FIFA World Cup 2026". FIFA. Retrieved June 18, 2026.; "Match Report – Group K – Uzbekistan v. Colombia". FIFA. June 18, 2026. Retrieved June 18, 2026.; "Post match summary report – Group K – Uzbekistan v. Colombia". FIFA. June 18, 2026. Retrieved June 19, 2026.) | Muñoz 40'; Díaz 65'; Campaz 90+9' |

Estadio Azteca, Mexico City
Attendance: 80,824
Referee: Anthony Taylor (England)

| Uzbekistan | Colombia |

| GK | 1 | Utkir Yusupov |
| CB | 2 | Abdukodir Khusanov | (yellow card) 34' |
| CB | 18 | Abdulla Abdullaev |
| CB | 5 | Rustam Ashurmatov | | (substituted off) 77' |
| RM | 24 | Bekhruz Karimov |
| CM | 7 | Otabek Shukurov |
| CM | 6 | Akmal Mozgovoy |
| LM | 13 | Sherzod Nasrullaev | | (substituted off) 46' |
| RF | 22 | Abbosbek Fayzullaev | | (substituted off) 77' |
| CF | 14 | Eldor Shomurodov (c) | | (substituted off) 90+3' |
| LF | 11 | Oston Urunov | | (substituted off) 46' |
Substitutions:
| DF | 4 | Farrukh Sayfiev | | (substituted on) 46' |
| MF | 17 | Dostonbek Khamdamov | | (substituted on) 46' |
| DF | 26 | Jakhongir Urozov | | (substituted on) 77' |
| FW | 20 | Azizbek Amonov | | (substituted on) 77' |
| FW | 21 | Igor Sergeev | | (substituted on) 90+3' |
Manager:
(Italy) Fabio Cannavaro

| GK | 12 | Camilo Vargas |
| RB | 2 | Daniel Muñoz |
| CB | 23 | Davinson Sánchez |
| CB | 3 | Jhon Lucumí |
| LB | 17 | Johan Mojica | (yellow card) 7' |
| DM | 16 | Jefferson Lerma |
| CM | 14 | Gustavo Puerta | | (substituted off) 80' |
| CM | 11 | Jhon Arias | | (substituted off) 90+3' |
| RF | 10 | James Rodríguez (c) | | (substituted off) 72' |
| CF | 25 | Luis Suárez | | (substituted off) 80' |
| LF | 7 | Luis Díaz | | (substituted off) 90+3' |
Substitutions:
| MF | 21 | Jaminton Campaz | | (substituted on) 72' |
| FW | 19 | Cucho Hernández | | (substituted on) 80' |
| MF | 6 | Richard Ríos | | (substituted on) 80' |
| FW | 26 | Andrés Gómez | | (substituted on) 90+3' |
| MF | 5 | Kevin Castaño | | (substituted on) 90+3' |
Manager:
(Argentina) Néstor Lorenzo

Man of the Match:
Luis Díaz (Colombia)

Assistant referees:
Gary Beswick (England)
Adam Nunn (England)
Fourth official:
Juan Gabriel Calderón (Costa Rica)
Reserve assistant referee:
Juan Carlos Mora (Costa Rica)
Video assistant referee:
Ivan Bebek (Croatia)
Assistant video assistant referee:
Jarred Gillett (England)
Support video assistant referee:
Carlos del Cerro Grande (Spain)

=== Portugal vs Uzbekistan ===
The two teams had never met before.

Cristiano Ronaldo scored twice in the first half, becoming the first player to score in six FIFA World Cup tournaments.

This fixture was the second-largest defeat suffered by an Asian team during the tournament's group stage, following Qatar's 6–0 loss to Canada and tied with Iraq's 5–0 loss against Senegal 3 days later.

June 23, 2026
12:00 p.m. UTC−5

| Portugal | 5–0 | Uzbekistan |
|---|---|---|
| Ronaldo 6', 39'; Mendes 17'; Nematov 60' (o.g.); Leão 87' | (Note: "Portugal vs Uzbekistan | First Stage | FIFA World Cup 2026". FIFA. Retrieved June 23, 2026.; "Match Report – Group K – Portugal v. Uzbekistan". FIFA. June 23, 2026. Retrieved June 23, 2026.; "Post match summary report – Group K – Portugal v. Uzbekistan". FIFA. June 23, 2026. Retrieved June 25, 2026.) |

NRG Stadium, Houston
Attendance: 68,777
Referee: Jalal Jayed (Morocco)

| Portugal | Uzbekistan |

| GK | 1 | Diogo Costa |
| RB | 20 | João Cancelo | | (substituted off) 46' |
| CB | 3 | Rúben Dias |
| CB | 13 | Renato Veiga | (yellow card) 68' |
| LB | 25 | Nuno Mendes |
| CM | 23 | Vitinha | | (substituted off) 83' |
| CM | 15 | João Neves | | (substituted off) 76' |
| RW | 18 | Pedro Neto | | (substituted off) 46' |
| AM | 8 | Bruno Fernandes |
| LW | 11 | João Félix | | (substituted off) 63' |
| CF | 7 | Cristiano Ronaldo (c) |
Substitutions:
| DF | 2 | Nélson Semedo | | (substituted on) 46' |
| FW | 26 | Francisco Conceição | | (substituted on) 46' |
| FW | 16 | Francisco Trincão | | (substituted on) 63' |
| MF | 10 | Bernardo Silva | | (substituted on) 76' |
| FW | 17 | Rafael Leão | | (substituted on) 83' |
Manager:
(Spain) Roberto Martínez

| GK | 12 | Abduvohid Nematov |
| CB | 2 | Abdukodir Khusanov |
| CB | 18 | Abdulla Abdullaev |
| CB | 5 | Rustam Ashurmatov |
| RM | 24 | Bekhruz Karimov | | (substituted off) 90+2' |
| CM | 9 | Odiljon Hamrobekov | (yellow card) 14' | (substituted off) 46' |
| CM | 7 | Otabek Shukurov | | (substituted off) 90+2' |
| LM | 13 | Sherzod Nasrullaev | | (substituted off) 46' |
| RF | 19 | Azizjon Ganiev |
| CF | 14 | Eldor Shomurodov (c) |
| LF | 22 | Abbosbek Fayzullaev | | (substituted off) 73' |
Substitutions:
| DF | 3 | Khojiakbar Alijonov | | (substituted on) 46' |
| MF | 6 | Akmal Mozgovoy | | (substituted on) 46' |
| FW | 21 | Igor Sergeev | | (substituted on) 73' |
| FW | 10 | Ruslanbek Jiyanov | | (substituted on) 90+2' |
| MF | 23 | Sherzod Esanov | | (substituted on) 90+2' |
Manager:
(Italy) Fabio Cannavaro

Man of the Match:
Cristiano Ronaldo (Portugal)

Assistant referees:
Zakaria Brinsi (Morocco)
Mostafa Akarkad (Morocco)
Fourth official:
Abongile Tom (South Africa)
Reserve assistant referee:
Zakhele Siwela (South Africa)
Video assistant referee:
Leodán González (Uruguay)
Assistant video assistant referee:
Hamza El Fariq (Morocco)
Support video assistant referee:
Hernán Mastrángelo (Argentina)

=== Colombia vs DR Congo ===
The two teams had never met before.

In the 76th minute, Daniel Muñoz scored the only goal of the game with a low finish from the right that was deflected and went in at the near post.

June 23, 2026
8:00 p.m. UTC−6

| Colombia | 1–0 | DR Congo |
|---|---|---|
| Muñoz 76' | (Note: "Colombia vs Congo DR | First Stage | FIFA World Cup 2026". FIFA. Retrieved June 24, 2026.; "Match Report – Group K – Colombia v. Congo DR". FIFA. June 24, 2026. Retrieved June 24, 2026.; "Post match summary report – Group K – Colombia v. Congo DR". FIFA. June 24, 2026. Retrieved June 25, 2026.) |

Estadio Akron, Zapopan
Attendance: 45,358
Referee: Maurizio Mariani (Italy)

| Colombia | DR Congo |

| GK | 12 | Camilo Vargas |
| RB | 2 | Daniel Muñoz |
| CB | 23 | Davinson Sánchez |
| CB | 3 | Jhon Lucumí | (yellow card) 56' |
| LB | 17 | Johan Mojica |
| DM | 16 | Jefferson Lerma | (yellow card) 90+4' |
| CM | 14 | Gustavo Puerta |
| CM | 11 | Jhon Arias | | (substituted off) 77' |
| RF | 10 | James Rodríguez (c) | | (substituted off) 58' |
| CF | 25 | Luis Suárez | | (substituted off) 58' |
| LF | 7 | Luis Díaz |
Substitutions:
| MF | 20 | Juan Fernando Quintero | | (substituted on) 58' |
| FW | 9 | Jhon Córdoba | | (substituted on) 58' |
| MF | 6 | Richard Ríos | | (substituted on) 77' |
Manager:
(Argentina) Néstor Lorenzo

| GK | 1 | Lionel Mpasi |
| CB | 22 | Chancel Mbemba (c) |
| CB | 4 | Axel Tuanzebe |
| CB | 3 | Steve Kapuadi |
| RWB | 2 | Aaron Wan-Bissaka |
| LWB | 26 | Arthur Masuaku | | (substituted off) 71' |
| CM | 6 | Ngal'ayel Mukau | | (substituted off) 46' |
| CM | 8 | Samuel Moutoussamy | | (substituted off) 82' |
| CM | 25 | Edo Kayembe | | (substituted off) 71' |
| CF | 17 | Cédric Bakambu | | (substituted off) 57' |
| CF | 20 | Yoane Wissa |
Substitutions:
| MF | 14 | Noah Sadiki | | (substituted on) 46' |
| FW | 23 | Simon Banza | | (substituted on) 57' |
| DF | 12 | Joris Kayembe | | (substituted on) 71' |
| MF | 18 | Charles Pickel | (yellow card) 90+3' | (substituted on) 71' |
| MF | 7 | Nathanaël Mbuku | | (substituted on) 82' |
Manager:
(France) Sébastien Desabre

Man of the Match:
Daniel Muñoz (Colombia)

Assistant referees:
Daniele Bindoni (Italy)
Alberto Tegoni (Italy)
Fourth official:
Juan Gabriel Calderón (Costa Rica)
Reserve assistant referee:
Juan Carlos Mora (Costa Rica)
Video assistant referee:
Marco Di Bello (Italy)
Assistant video assistant referee:
Mohammed Obaid Khadim (United Arab Emirates)
Support video assistant referee:
Carlos del Cerro Grande (Spain)

=== Colombia vs Portugal ===
The two teams had never met before.

Both teams struggled to make goals from either side, with Cristiano Ronaldo missing his shots throughout. In the end, both teams finished with a 0–0 draw, with Diogo Costa earning Man of the Match for his consistent performance.

June 27, 2026
7:30 p.m. UTC−4

| Colombia | 0–0 | Portugal |
|---|---|---|
| | (Note: "Colombia vs Portugal | First Stage | FIFA World Cup 2026". FIFA. Retrieved June 28, 2026.; "Match Report – Group K – Colombia v. Portugal". FIFA. June 28, 2026. Retrieved June 28, 2026.; "Post match summary report – Group K – Colombia v. Portugal". FIFA. June 28, 2026. Retrieved June 28, 2026.) |

Hard Rock Stadium, Miami Gardens
Attendance: 64,478
Referee: Alireza Faghani (Australia)

| Colombia | Portugal |

| GK | 12 | Camilo Vargas |
| RB | 4 | Santiago Arias | | (substituted off) 87' |
| CB | 23 | Davinson Sánchez |
| CB | 3 | Jhon Lucumí |
| LB | 22 | Deiver Machado |
| DM | 16 | Jefferson Lerma | | (substituted off) 60' |
| CM | 14 | Gustavo Puerta | (yellow card) 86' |
| CM | 11 | Jhon Arias | | (substituted off) 76' |
| RF | 10 | James Rodríguez (c) | | (substituted off) 76' |
| CF | 9 | Jhon Córdoba | | (substituted off) 60' |
| LF | 7 | Luis Díaz |
Substitutions:
| FW | 25 | Luis Suárez | | (substituted on) 60' |
| MF | 6 | Richard Ríos | | (substituted on) 60' |
| MF | 20 | Juan Fernando Quintero | | (substituted on) 76' |
| MF | 5 | Kevin Castaño | | (substituted on) 76' |
| DF | 2 | Daniel Muñoz | | (substituted on) 87' |
Manager:
(Argentina) Néstor Lorenzo

| GK | 1 | Diogo Costa |
| RB | 20 | João Cancelo | (substituted off) 46' |
| CB | 3 | Rúben Dias |
| CB | 13 | Renato Veiga |
| LB | 25 | Nuno Mendes | (substituted off) 90+2' |
| CM | 21 | Rúben Neves | (substituted off) 46' |
| CM | 23 | Vitinha | (substituted off) 70' |
| RW | 18 | Pedro Neto |
| AM | 8 | Bruno Fernandes |
| LW | 11 | João Félix | (substituted off) 70' |
| CF | 7 | Cristiano Ronaldo (c) |
Substitutions:
| MF | 15 | João Neves | (substituted on) 46' |
| DF | 5 | Diogo Dalot | (substituted on) 46' |
| FW | 17 | Rafael Leão | (substituted on) 70' |
| MF | 24 | Samú Costa | (substituted on) 70' |
| MF | 6 | Matheus Nunes | (substituted on) 90+2' |
Manager:
(Spain) Roberto Martínez

Man of the Match:
Diogo Costa (Portugal)

Assistant referees:
George Lakrindis (Australia)
James Lindsay (Australia)
Fourth official:
Saíd Martínez (Honduras)
Reserve assistant referee:
Walter López (Honduras)
Video assistant referee:
Jérôme Brisard (France)
Assistant video assistant referee:
Hernán Mastrángelo (Argentina)
Support video assistant referee:
Mahmoud Ashour (Egypt)

=== DR Congo vs Uzbekistan ===
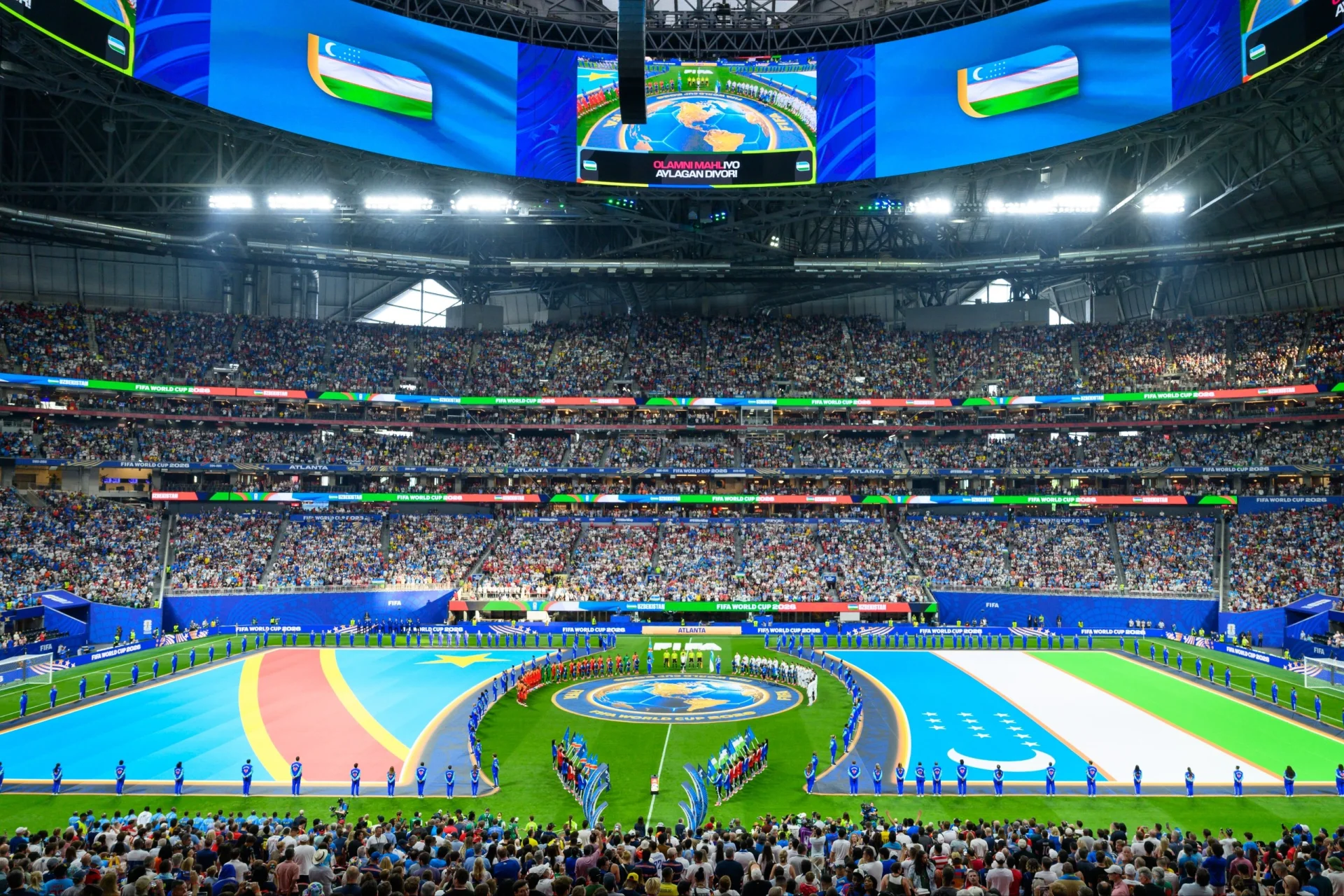
Pre-match anthems between DR Congo and Uzbekistan

The two teams had never met before.

Uzbekistan scored an early lead against the determined DR Congo team by Eldor Shomurodov in the first half, though a costly mistake in the second half resulted in Yoane Wissa to score an equalizer. Additional goals by Fiston Mayele and Yoane Wissa secured DR Congo's spot in the knockout phase for the first time ever.

For Uzbekistan, three straight defeats meant they were eliminated from the group stage alongside fellow debutant Jordan, who also went winless with three straight defeats in their group.

June 27, 2026
7:30 p.m. UTC−4

| DR Congo | 3–1 | Uzbekistan |
|---|---|---|
| Wissa 68' (pen.), 90+1'; Mayele 78' | (Note: "Congo DR vs Uzbekistan | First Stage | FIFA World Cup 2026". FIFA. Retrieved June 28, 2026.; "Match Report – Group K – Congo DR v. Uzbekistan". FIFA. June 28, 2026. Retrieved June 28, 2026.; "Post match summary report – Group K – Congo DR v. Uzbekistan". FIFA. June 28, 2026. Retrieved June 28, 2026.) | Shomurodov 10' |

Mercedes-Benz Stadium, Atlanta
Attendance: 68,239
Referee: Felix Zwayer (Germany)

| DR Congo | Uzbekistan |

| GK | 1 | Lionel Mpasi |
| RB | 2 | Aaron Wan-Bissaka |
| CB | 22 | Chancel Mbemba (c) |
| CB | 4 | Axel Tuanzebe |
| LB | 26 | Arthur Masuaku | | (substituted off) 83' |
| RM | 9 | Brian Cipenga | | (substituted off) 72' |
| CM | 8 | Samuel Moutoussamy | (yellow card) 62' | (substituted off) 72' |
| CM | 14 | Noah Sadiki | (yellow card) 21' |
| LM | 7 | Nathanaël Mbuku | (yellow card) 45+4' | (substituted off) 72' |
| CF | 17 | Cédric Bakambu | | (substituted off) 51' |
| CF | 20 | Yoane Wissa |
Substitutions:
| FW | 19 | Fiston Mayele | | (substituted on) 51' |
| FW | 13 | Meschak Elia | | (substituted on) 72' |
| MF | 10 | Théo Bongonda | | (substituted on) 72' |
| MF | 6 | Ngal'ayel Mukau | | (substituted on) 72' |
| DF | 12 | Joris Kayembe | | (substituted on) 83' |
Manager:
(France) Sébastien Desabre

| GK | 12 | Abduvohid Nematov |
| CB | 2 | Abdukodir Khusanov | (yellow card) 43' |
| CB | 5 | Rustam Ashurmatov |
| CB | 26 | Jakhongir Urozov | | (substituted off) 82' |
| RM | 3 | Khojiakbar Alijonov |
| CM | 7 | Otabek Shukurov | | (substituted off) 58' |
| CM | 6 | Akmal Mozgovoy | | (substituted off) 82' |
| LM | 13 | Sherzod Nasrullaev | (yellow card) 47' |
| RF | 22 | Abbosbek Fayzullaev | | (substituted off) 73' |
| CF | 14 | Eldor Shomurodov (c) |
| LF | 17 | Dostonbek Khamdamov | | (substituted off) 58' |
Substitutions:
| MF | 9 | Odiljon Hamrobekov | | (substituted on) 58' |
| MF | 19 | Azizjon Ganiev | | (substituted on) 58' |
| MF | 11 | Oston Urunov | | (substituted on) 73' |
| MF | 8 | Jamshid Iskanderov | | (substituted on) 82' |
| FW | 21 | Igor Sergeev | | (substituted on) 82' |
Manager:
(Italy) Fabio Cannavaro

Man of the Match:
Yoane Wissa (DR Congo)

Assistant referees:
Robert Kempter (Germany)
Christian Dietz (Germany)
Fourth official:
Alejandro Hernández Hernández (Spain)
Reserve assistant referee:
Diego Sánchez Rojo (Spain)
Video assistant referee:
Bastian Dankert (Germany)
Assistant video assistant referee:
Dennis Higler (Netherlands)
Support video assistant referee:
Jarred Gillett (England)

== Discipline ==
The team conduct ("fair play") score would have been used as a tiebreaker if the head-to-head and overall records of teams were tied. It would also be used as a tiebreaker for the third-place ranking between groups if the overall records of teams were tied. The score was calculated based on yellow and red cards received by players and team officials in all group matches as follows:

- yellow card: −1 point;
- indirect red card (second yellow card): −3 points;
- direct red card: −4 points;
- yellow card and direct red card: −5 points;

Only one of the above deductions could be applied to a player or team official in a single match.

| Team | Match 1 | | | | Match 2 | | | | Match 3 | | | | Score |
| Team | Yellow card | (yellow card) (yellow-red card) | Red card | (yellow card) (red card) | Yellow card | (yellow card) (yellow-red card) | Red card | (yellow card) (red card) | Yellow card | (yellow card) (yellow-red card) | Red card | (yellow card) (red card) | Score |
|---|---|---|---|---|---|---|---|---|---|---|---|---|---|
| Colombia | 1 | | | | 2 | | | | 1 | | | | −4 |
| Portugal | 3 | | | | 1 | | | | | | | | −4 |
| Uzbekistan | 1 | | | | 1 | | | | 2 | | | | −4 |
| DR Congo | 1 | | | | 1 | | | | 3 | | | | −5 |
