= Suhrob Nurulloyev =

Uzbek footballer (born 1998)

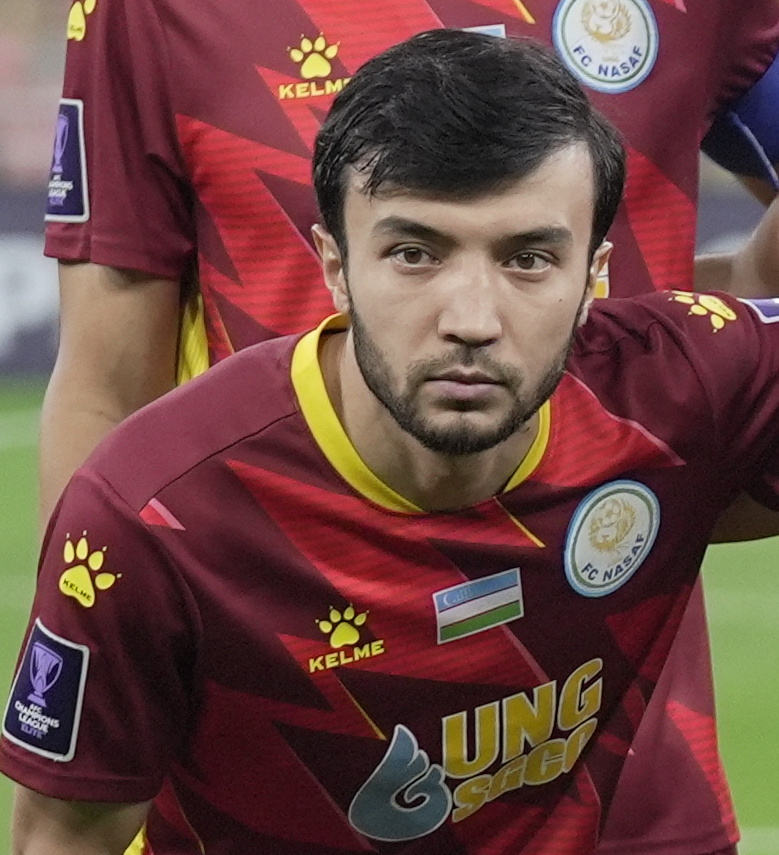

Personal information
- Full name: Uzbek: Suhrob Tolibjon o'g'li Nurulloyev
- Date of birth: January 4, 1998 (age 28)
- Place of birth: Qorakoʻl, Uzbekistan
- Height: 1.67 m (5 ft 5 1/2 in)
- Position: Midfielder

Team information
- Current team: Kedah Darul Aman
- Number: 17

Youth career
- 2014-2016: Pakhtakor

Senior career*
Years	Team	Apps	(Gls)
2016-2018	Pakhtakor	29	(3)
2018-2019	Metallurg Bekabad	36	(2)
2020	Kokand 1912	2	(0)
2020	Pakhtakor	-	(-)
2020	→ Dinamo Samarqand (loan)	18	(4)
2021-2023	Nasaf	26	(3)
2024-	Kedah Darul Aman	0	(0)

International career
2015-2018	Uzbekistan U20	6	(0)
2017-2020	Uzbekistan U23	10	(0)
- * Club domestic league appearances and goals

Suhrob Nurulloyev (born 4 January 1998) is an Uzbek professional association football player who plays as a midfielder for Kedah Darul Aman and Uzbekistan national football team.

== Club career ==
Since 2021 played for Nasaf Qarshi. On 5 January 2024, it was announced that his contract with Nasaf had been extended.

On 9 March 2024, it was announced that he had transferred to Malaysian club Kedah Darul Aman.

== Honours ==
- AFC U-23 Asian Cup winner: 2018
- Uzbekistan Super League champion: 2015, 2020
- Uzbekistan Cup winner (4): 2020, 2021, 2022, 2023
- Uzbekistan Super Cup winner: 2023, 2025
- AFC Cup runner-up: 2021
