= Abduvohid Nematov =

Uzbek footballer (born 2001)

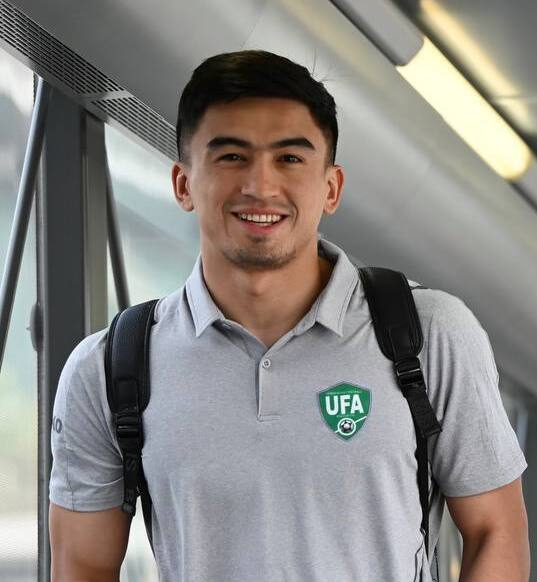
- Nematov in 2024

Personal information
- Full name: Abduvohid Furqat oʻgʻli Neʼmatov
- Date of birth: 20 March 2001 (age 25)
- Place of birth: Jizzakh, Uzbekistan
- Height: 1.83 m (6 ft 0 in)
- Position: Goalkeeper

Team information
- Current team: Nasaf
- Number: 1

Youth career
- Nasaf

Senior career*
Years	Team	Apps	(Gls)
2017–	Nasaf	151	(3)

International career^{‡}
2017	Uzbekistan U17	3	(0)
2019	Uzbekistan U19	3	(0)
2019–	Uzbekistan Olympic	23	(0)
2020–	Uzbekistan	17	(0)
Medal record
Representing Uzbekistan
FIFA Series
Winner	2026 Uzbekistan
CAFA Nations Cup
Runner-up	2023 Kyrgyzstan–Uzbekistan	Team
Winner	2025 Tajikistan–Uzbekistan	Team
AFC U-23 Asian Cup
Runner-up	2022 Uzbekistan	Team
Runner-up	2024 Qatar	Team
- * Club domestic league appearances and goals as of 20 September 2026 ‡ National team caps and goals as of 25 June 2026 (UTC)

Abduvohid Furkatovich Nematov (Uzbek: Abduvohid Furqat oʻgʻli Neʼmatov, Абдувоҳид Фурқат ўғли Неъматов; born 20 March 2001) is an Uzbek professional footballer who plays as a goalkeeper for Nasaf and the Uzbekistan national team.

== Career ==
=== International ===
Nematov made his debut for the Uzbekistan main team on 3 September 2020 in a friendly match against Tajikistan.

He was part of the Uzbekistan squad at the 2026 FIFA World Cup and is listed as having scored an own goal in the Group K 5–0 defeat against Portugal.

Uzbekistan national team
Year	Apps	Goals
2020	4	0
2021	2	0
2022	0	0
2023	1	0
Total	7	0

Statistics accurate as of match played 14 June 2023.

== Honours ==
Uzbekistan

- FIFA Series Uzbekistan: 2026
- CAFA Nations Cup: 2025

Nasaf

- Uzbekistan Cup: 2021, 2022, 2023
- Uzbekistan Super Cup: 2023, 2024
- Uzbekistan Super League: 2024

Individual

- AFC U-23 Asian Cup Best Goalkeeper: 2024
- Uzbekistan Super League Team of the Season: 2024
