= Bekhruz Karimov =

Uzbek footballer (born 2007)

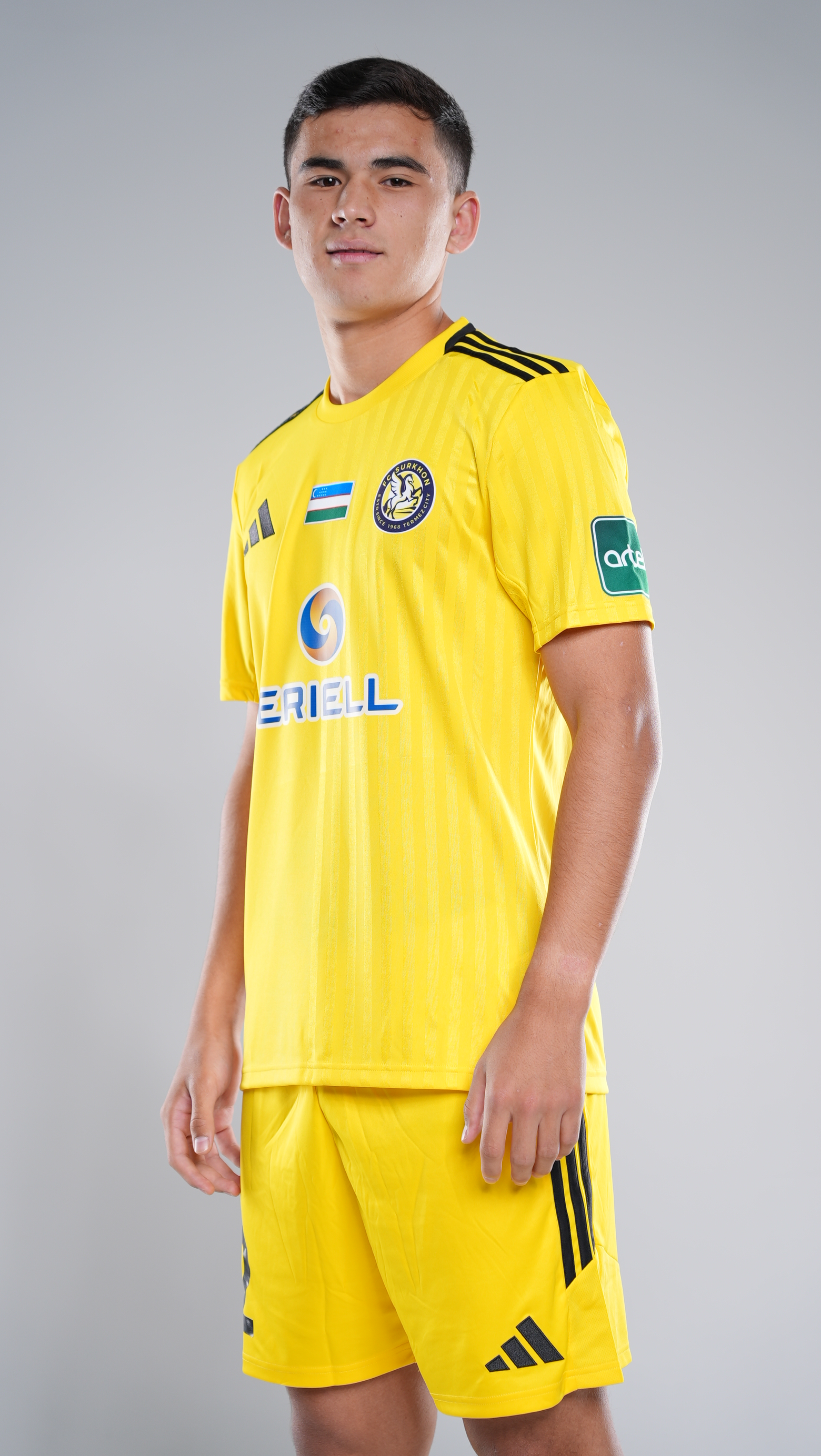
- Karimov in 2026

Personal information
- Full name: Behruzjon Karimov
- Date of birth: 7 August 2007 (age 19)
- Place of birth: Tashkent, Uzbekistan
- Height: 1.80 m (5 ft 11 in)
- Position: Right-back

Team information
- Current team: Lugano
- Number: 2

Youth career
- RKOR Tashkent

Senior career*
Years	Team	Apps	(Gls)
2023–2025	Olympic	26	(0)
2025–2026	Surkhon	22	(3)
2026–	Lugano	9	(1)

International career^{‡}
2023	Uzbekistan U16	4	(0)
2023–2024	Uzbekistan U17	15	(0)
2025	Uzbekistan U18	6	(1)
2024	Uzbekistan U20	5	(0)
2025	Uzbekistan U21	2	(0)
2025–	Uzbekistan U23	7	(1)
2026–	Uzbekistan	8	(1)
- * Club domestic league appearances and goals as of 20:59, 1 November 2026 (UTC) ‡ National team caps and goals as of 22:10, 12 November 2026 (UTC)

Bekhruzjon Karimov (Uzbek: Behruzjon Alisher oʻgʻli Karimov, Беҳрузжон Каримов; born 7 August 2007) is an Uzbekistani professional footballer who plays as a right-back for Swiss Super League club Lugano, and the Uzbekistan national team.

== Club career ==
Karimov began his career in the Uzbekistan Super League with Olympic Tashkent, before moving to Surkhon in 2025 where he had his breakout season. In May 2026, he fractured his leg requiring surgery.

On August 10, 2026, Karimov underwent a medical examination in Tashkent, after which he signed a contract with the Swiss FC Lugano.

== International career ==
Karimov was part of the Uzbekistan U17s for the 2023 AFC U-17 Asian Cup. He also made the Uzbekistan U23s for the 2024 AFC U-23 Asian Cup and 2026 AFC U-23 Asian Cup.

In March 2026, he received his first call-ups to the Uzbekistan national team for a set of 2026 FIFA Series matches.

He made the cut for the preliminary national team for the 2026 FIFA World Cup.

=== International goals ===
As of match played 12 November 2026

Appearances and goals by national team and year
National team	Year	Apps	Goals
Uzbekistan	2026	8	1
Total		8	1

Scores and results list Uzbekistan's goal tally first, score column indicates score after each Karimov goal.

List of international goals scored by Bekhruz Karimov
No.	Date	Venue	Opponent	Score	Result	Competition
1	12 November 2026	Pakhtakor Central Stadium, Tashkent, Uzbekistan	Russia	2–0	2–3	Friendly
