= Sherzod Nasrullaev =

Uzbek footballer (born 1998)

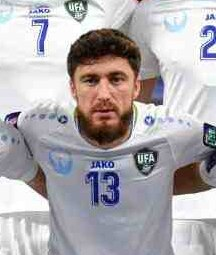
- Nasrullaev in 2018

Personal information
- Birth name: Sherzod Innatillo oʻgʻli Nasrullayev
- Date of birth: July 23, 1998 (age 28)
- Place of birth: Koson, Uzbekistan
- Height: 1.80 m (5 ft 11 in)
- Position: Left-back

Team information
- Current team: Pakhtakor
- Number: 34

Youth career
- Nasaf

Senior career*
Years	Team	Apps	(Gls)
2018–2025	Nasaf	167	(10)
2026–	Pakhtakor	12	(0)

International career^{‡}
2018	Uzbekistan U21	3	(1)
2019	Uzbekistan U23	1	(0)
2022–	Uzbekistan	43	(2)
Medal record
Representing Uzbekistan
CAFA Nations Cup
Runner-up	2023 Kyrgyzstan–Uzbekistan	Team
- * Club domestic league appearances and goals as of 28 July 2026 ‡ National team caps and goals as of 23 July 2026

Sherzod Innatillo oʻgʻli Nasrullayev (Uzbek Cyrillic: Шерзод Иннатилло ўғли Насруллаев; born 23 July 1998) is an Uzbek professional footballer who plays as a left-back for Uzbekistan Super League club Pakhtakor and the Uzbekistan national team.

== Club career ==
Nasrullaev began his senior career with Nasaf in 2018. He helped them win 3 consecutive Uzbekistan Cups and 1 Uzbekistan Super Cup.

== International career ==
Nasrullaev was called up to the Uzbekistan U21s to a youth tournament in 2018, and won the prize for "goal of the tournament" for his game-winning goal in the final. He was part of the Uzbekistan U23s at the 2020 AFC U-23 Championship.

Nasrullaev was first called up to the senior Uzbekistan national team in 2022. He was called up to the national team for the 2023 AFC Asian Cup.

On 2 June 2026, he was included in the 26-man squad selected by head coach Fabio Cannavaro for the 2026 FIFA World Cup, marking the country's first-ever appearance in the tournament.

== Career statistics ==
=== International ===
As of match played 27 June 2026

Appearances and goals by national team and year
National team	Year	Apps	Goals
Uzbekistan	2022	5	0
Uzbekistan	2023	11	0
Uzbekistan	2024	10	2
Uzbekistan	2025	10	0
Uzbekistan	2026	7	0
Total		43	2

Scores and results list Uzbekistan's goal tally first, score column indicates score after each Nasrullaev goal.

List of international goals scored by Sherzod Nasrullaev
No.	Date	Venue	Opponent	Score	Result	Competition
1	18 January 2024	Ahmad bin Ali Stadium, Al Rayyan, Qatar	India	3–0	3–0	2023 AFC Asian Cup
2	6 June 2024	Milliy Stadium, Tashkent, Uzbekistan	Turkmenistan	3–1	3–1	2026 FIFA World Cup qualification

== Honours ==
Nasaf

- Uzbekistan Cup: 2021, 2022, 2023
- Uzbekistan Super Cup: 2023
