= Jakhongir Urozov =

Uzbek footballer (born 2004)

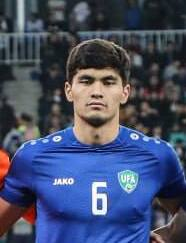

Personal information
- Birth name: Jahongir Ilhom oʻgʻli Oʻrozov
- Date of birth: 18 January 2004 (age 22)
- Place of birth: Zomin, Jizzakh, Uzbekistan
- Height: 1.90 m (6 ft 3 in)
- Position: Left-back

Team information
- Current team: Rubin Kazan (on loan from Dinamo Samarqand)
- Number: 13

Youth career
- 2020–2022: Bunyodkor

Senior career*
| Years | Team | Apps | (Gls) |
| 2022–2023 | Bunyodkor | 17 | (0) |
| 2023–2024 | Eyüpspor | 0 | (0) |
| 2024 | → Dinamo Samarqand (loan) | 13 | (0) |
| 2025– | Dinamo Samarqand | 40 | (0) |
| 2026– | → Rubin Kazan (loan) | 9 | (0) |

International career^{‡}
| 2022 | Uzbekistan U19 | 4 | (0) |
| 2022–2023 | Uzbekistan U20 | 15 | (0) |
| 2025– | Uzbekistan U23 | 9 | (1) |
| 2026– | Uzbekistan | 11 | (1) |
- * Club domestic league appearances and goals as of 6 November 2026 ‡ National team caps and goals as of 17 November 2026

Jahongir Oʻrozov (Uzbek Cyrillic: Жаҳонгир Ўрозов; born 18 January 2004) is an Uzbek professional footballer who plays as a left-back for Russian club Rubin Kazan on loan from Dinamo Samarqand, and the Uzbekistan national team.

== Club career ==
Born in Djizak, Uzbekistan, Jakhongir Urozov was trained at Bunyodkor's youth academy. He signed his first professional contract with the club on 13 February 2021.

On 16 August 2023, Urozov moved to Turkey after signing a five-year contract with Eyüpspor, keeping him at the club until June 2028. However, he initially joined the club's youth team in the under-19 age group. In October 2023, he began making his first appearance in the club's main squad, but remained on the bench.

He made his first and only appearance for Eyüpspor on 16 January 2024, coming on as a late substitute in a 4–0 Turkish Cup defeat to Beşiktaş. However, the player failed to establish himself at the club, and from January 2024 onward, he was no longer included in the club's roster, never playing again. He and the club won the 2023/2024 Turkish First League championship that season, earning direct promotion to the top division.

In the summer of 2024, Urozov was loaned to Dinamo Samarqand until the end of the year. He established himself as a regular starter at the club, which expressed its intention to sign him on a permanent transfer during the 2025 winter transfer window. He scored his first goal for the club on August 2, 2025, in a match against Navbahor, providing an assist. He scored his debut goal for the club on August 27, 2025, in the Uzbekistan Cup match against the club "Shurtan". At the end of the season, together with the club, he finished the championship in fourth place in the standings. In total, he scored one goal and made two assists in all competitions this season.

On 3 August 2026, Urozov transferred to Russian Premier League club Rubin Kazan from Dinamo Samarqand on loan until the end of 2026.

== International career ==
=== Youth teams ===
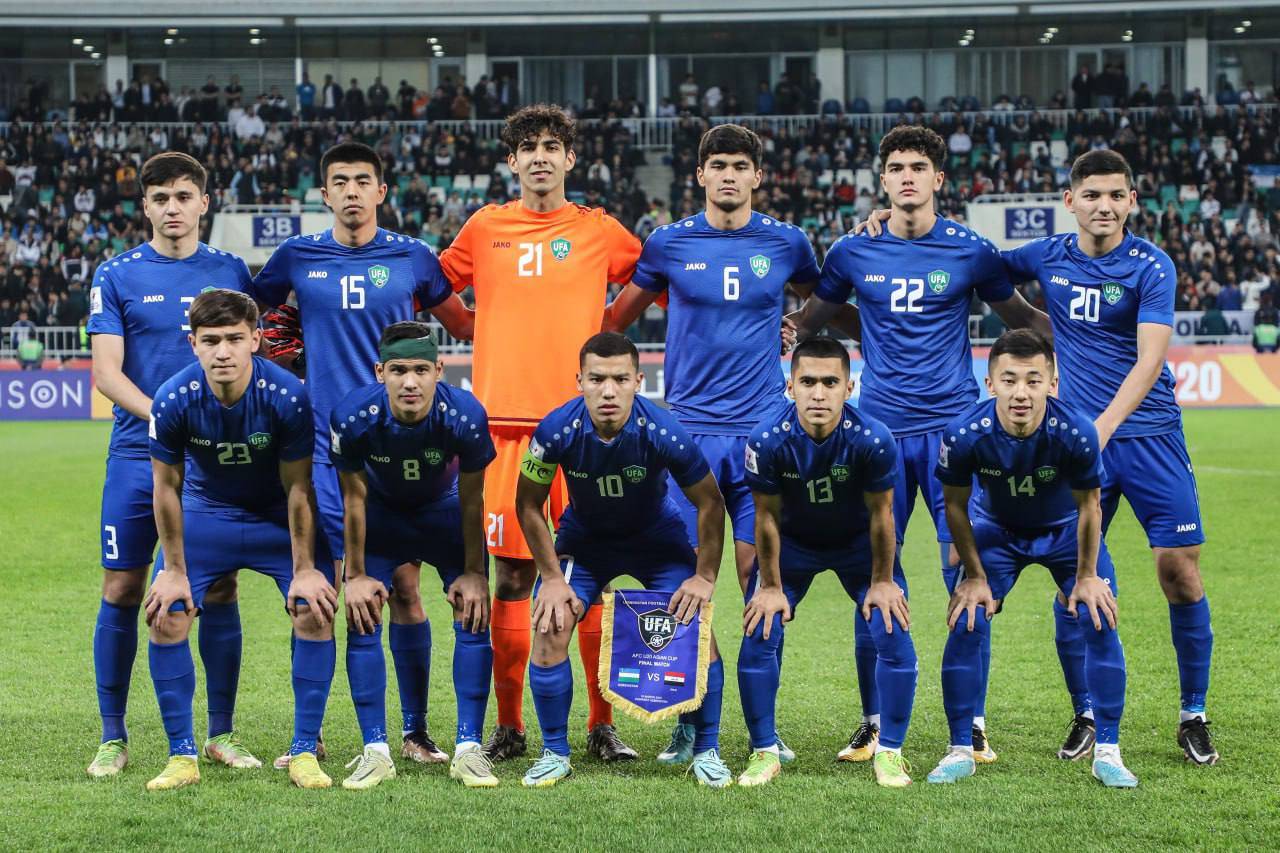
Uzbekistan U-20 national football team in AFC Asian Cup 2023. Bunyodkor Stadium, Tashkent, Uzbekistan. March 18, 2023

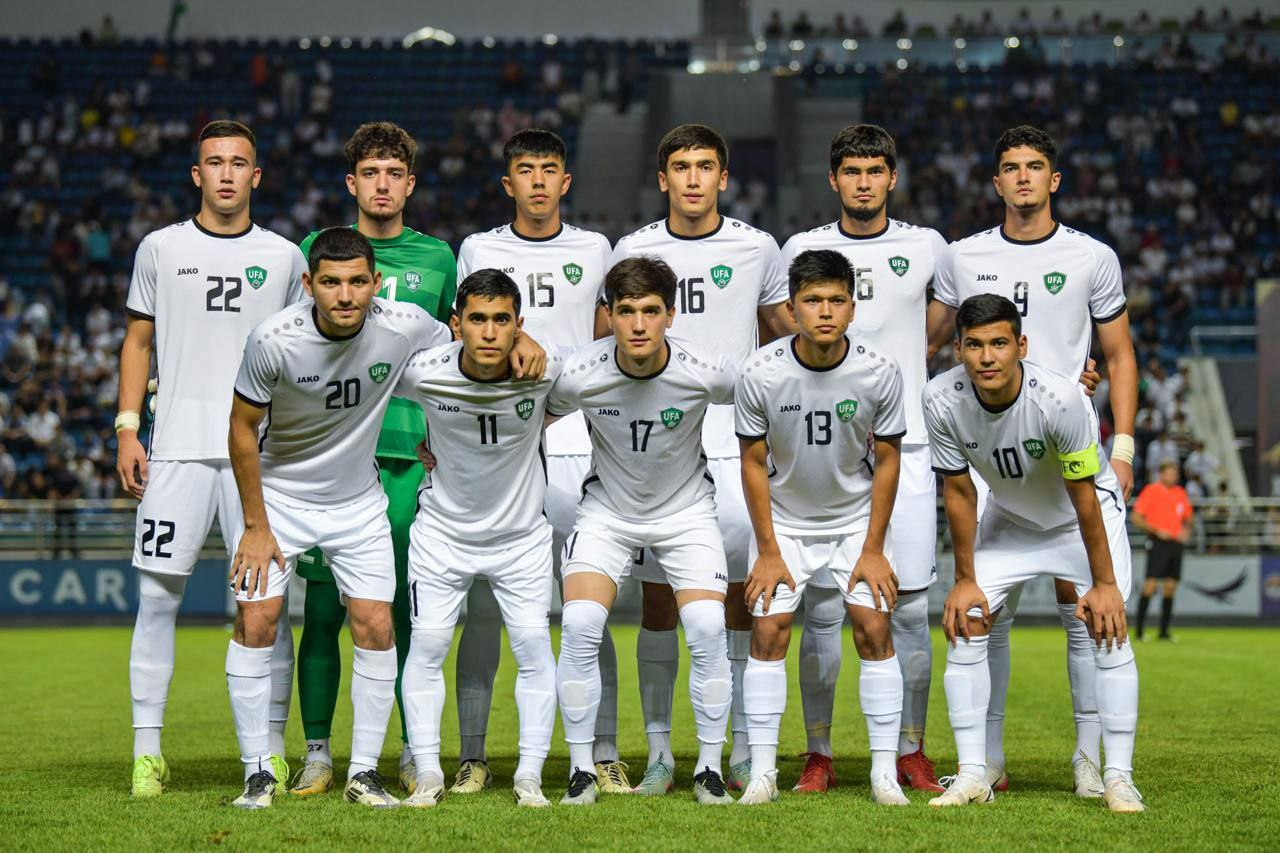
Uzbekistan U23 football team at Mirabror Usmanov Memorial Cup 2025

In June 2022, he made his debut for the Uzbekistan U19 Youth Team, playing two friendly matches against the Belarus. In September 2022, he received a call-up to the Uzbekistan U20 Youth Team, for which he played two full matches against his peers from the Slovakia. In March 2023, together with the Uzbekistan youth team, he went to the African U-20 Championship. He played his first match at the tournament on March 1, 2023, against the Syria. Together with the national team, he took first place in the group and reached the playoff stage. In the quarter-final match on March 11, 2023, they defeated the Australia team in a penalty shootout and advanced to the semi-finals of the tournament. Also, by defeating the Australians, he helped his team win a ticket to the 2023 FIFA World Youth Championship. Became a finalist of the tournament, defeating the South Korea in a penalty shootout on March 15, 2023 in the semi-final match. He became the winner of the AFC U-20 Football Championship, defeating the Iraqi team in the final on March 18, 2023.

In May 2023, he received a call-up to the Uzbekistan youth team to participate in the World Cup. The first match of the tournament was played on May 20, 2023 against the Argentina. Following the group stage, the national team took second place in the group and advanced to the playoff stage. At the 1/8 final stage on May 30, 2023, they lost to the Israel and ended their participation in the World Cup. He was a key player for the national team throughout the tournament, playing all the matches. In March 2024, he was called up to the Uzbekistan under-23 youth team. He made his debut for the national team on March 20, 2024, in a friendly match against the China. He scored his debut goal for the national team on July 22, 2025, in a match against the Saudi Arabia national under-23 football team. In September 2025, he traveled with the national team to the qualifying matches for the AFC U-23 Asian Cup. He qualified with the national team for the main stage of the tournament.

=== National team ===
Urozov made his debut for the Uzbekistan main team on 27 March 2026 in a FIFA Series match against Gabon.

On 2 June 2026, he was included in the 26-man squad selected by head coach Fabio Cannavaro for the 2026 FIFA World Cup, marking the country's first-ever appearance in the tournament. He played his first match at the tournament on 18 June 2026, against the Colombia national football team, coming on as a substitute in the 77th minute.

== Career statistics ==
=== Club ===
As of 6 November 2026

| Club | Season | League | | | Cup | | Total | |
| Club | Season | Division | Apps | Goals | Apps | Goals | Apps | Goals |
|---|---|---|---|---|---|---|---|---|
| Bunyodkor | 2022 | Uzbekistan Super League | 14 | 0 | 2 | 0 | 16 | 0 |
| Bunyodkor | 2023 | Uzbekistan Super League | 3 | 0 | 1 | 0 | 4 | 0 |
| Bunyodkor | Total | | 17 | 0 | 3 | 0 | 20 | 0 |
| Eyüpspor | 2023–24 | TFF 1. Lig | 0 | 0 | 1 | 0 | 1 | 0 |
| Dinamo Samarqand (loan) | 2024 | Uzbekistan Super League | 13 | 0 | — | | 13 | 0 |
| Dinamo Samarqand | 2025 | Uzbekistan Super League | 28 | 0 | 4 | 1 | 32 | 1 |
| Dinamo Samarqand | 2026 | Uzbekistan Super League | 12 | 0 | 0 | 0 | 12 | 0 |
| Dinamo Samarqand | Total | | 40 | 0 | 4 | 1 | 44 | 1 |
| Dinamo Samarqand | Club total | | 53 | 0 | 4 | 1 | 57 | 1 |
| Rubin Kazan (loan) | 2026–27 | Russian Premier League | 9 | 0 | 4 | 0 | 13 | 0 |
| Career total | | | 79 | 0 | 12 | 1 | 91 | 1 |

=== International ===
==== International goals ====
| No. | Date | Venue | Opponent | Score | Result | Competition |
|---|---|---|---|---|---|---|
| 1 | 27 March 2026 | Bunyodkor Stadium, Tashkent, Uzbekistan | Gabon | 1–1 | 3–1 | 2026 FIFA Series |

== Honours ==
Eyüpspor

- TFF 1. Lig: 2023–24

Uzbekistan U20

- U20 AFC Asian Cup, 2023
