= Golib Gaybullaev =

Uzbekistani footballer (born 1996)

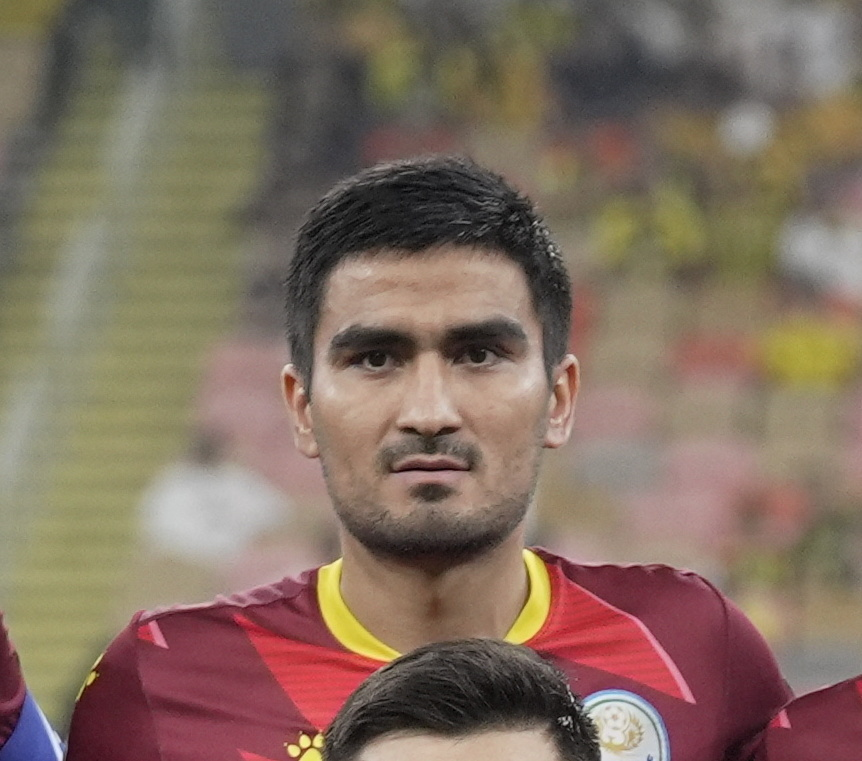

Personal information
- Full name: Gʻolib Shokir oʻgʻli Gʻaybullayev
- Date of birth: 22 January 1996 (age 30)
- Place of birth: Koson, Uzbekistan
- Height: 1.86 m (6 ft 1 in)
- Position: Defender

Team information
- Current team: Nasaf
- Number: 5

Senior career*
| Years | Team | Apps | (Gls) |
| 2015– | Nasaf | 194 | (5) |

International career^{‡}
| 2023– | Uzbekistan | 1 | (1) |
- * Club domestic league appearances and goals as of 29 July 2026 ‡ National team caps and goals as of 23 December 2023

Golib Gaybullaev (Russian: Gʻolib Shokir oʻgʻli Gʻaybullayev; born 22 January 1996) is an Uzbekistani professional footballer who plays as a defender for Nasaf and Uzbekistan national football team.

== Career ==
=== International ===
Gaybullaev made his debut for the Uzbekistan main team on 25 December 2023 in a Friendly match against Kyrgyzstan.

Uzbekistan national team
| Year | Apps | Goals |
|---|---|---|
| 2023 | 1 | 1 |
| 2024 | 0 | 0 |
| 2025 | 1 | 0 |
| Total | 2 | 1 |

Statistics accurate as of match played 25 December 2023.

=== International goals ===
Scores and results list Uzbekistan's goal tally first.

| # | Date | Venue | Opponent | Score | Result | Competition |
|---|---|---|---|---|---|---|
| 1. | 25 December 2023 | Al Maktoum Stadium, Dubai, United Arab Emirates | Kyrgyzstan | 4–0 | 4–1 | Friendly Match |

== Honours ==
Nasaf

- Uzbekistan Super League: 2025
- Uzbekistan Cup winners: 2021, 2022, 2023
- Uzbekistan Super Cup winners: 2024, runner-up: 2022
- AFC Cup runner-up: 2021
