= Akmal Mozgovoy =

Uzbekistani footballer (born 1999)

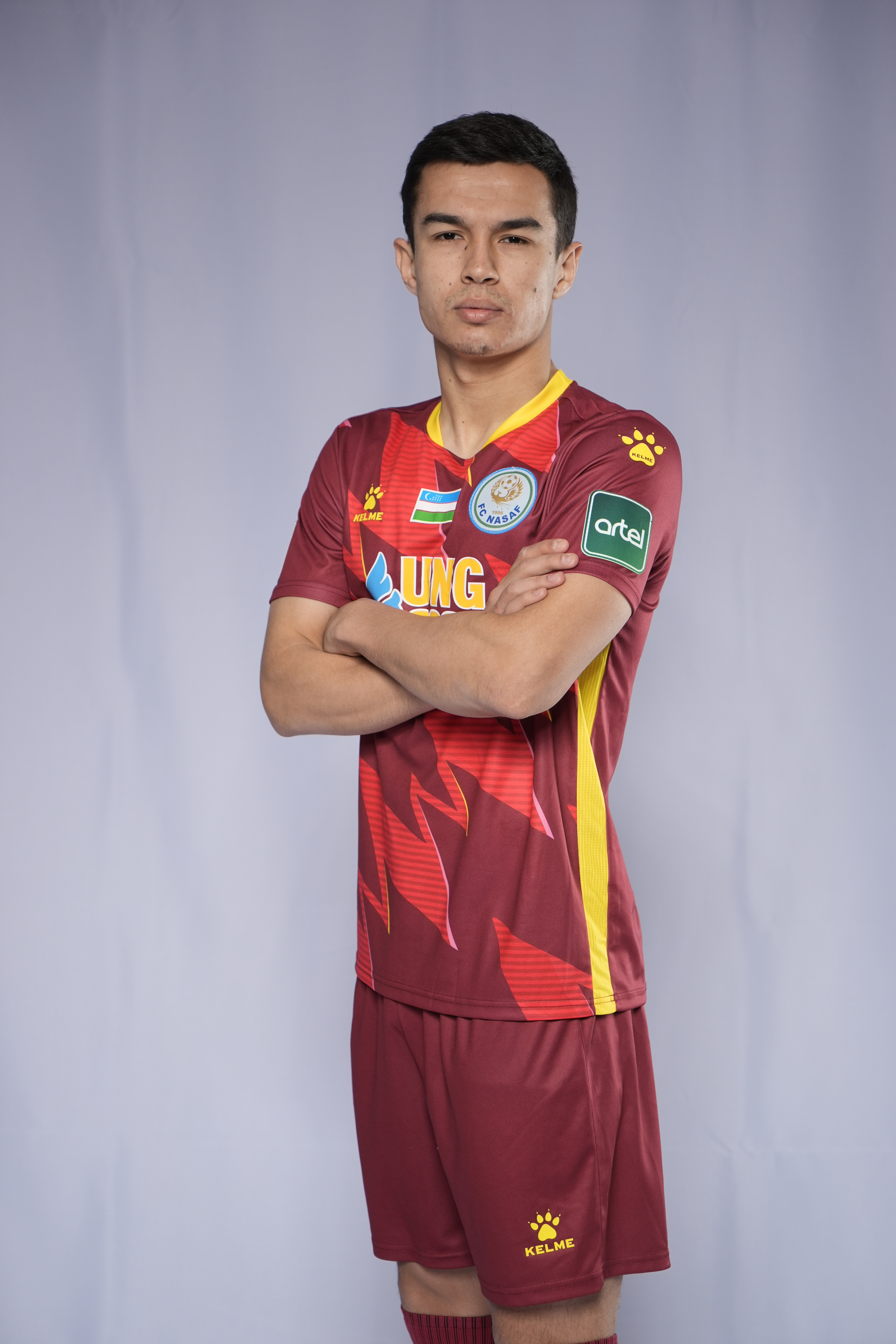

Personal information
- Full name: Akmal Vladimirovich Mozgovoy
- Date of birth: 2 April 1999 (age 27)
- Place of birth: Qarshi, Uzbekistan
- Height: 1.80 m (5 ft 11 in)
- Position: Midfielder

Team information
- Current team: Pakhtakor
- Number: 10

Senior career*
Years	Team	Apps	(Gls)
2018–2025	Nasaf	163	(13)
2025–2026	Baniyas	11	(0)
2026–	Pakhtakor	14	(0)

International career^{‡}
2018–2020	Uzbekistan U20	3	(0)
2021	Uzbekistan U23	11	(0)
2020–	Uzbekistan	30	(2)
Medal record
Men's football
Representing Uzbekistan
FIFA Series
Winner	2026 Uzbekistan
CAFA Nations Cup
Runner-up	2023 Kyrgyzstan–Uzbekistan	Team
Winner	2025 Tajikistan–Uzbekistan	Team
- * Club domestic league appearances and goals as of 28 July 2026 ‡ National team caps and goals as of 1 October 2026 (UTC)

Akmal Vladimirovich Mozgovoy (Uzbek: Akmal Mozgovoy; born 2 April 1999) is an Uzbek professional footballer who plays as a midfielder for Pakhtakor and the Uzbekistan national team.

== Career ==
=== International ===
Mozgovoy made his debut for the Uzbekistan main team on 3 September 2020 in a Friendly match against Tajikistan.

As of match played 1 October 2026

Uzbekistan national team
Year	Apps	Goals
2020	3	0
2021	3	0
2022	2	0
2023	2	0
2024	2	0
2025	9	1
2026	9	1
Total	30	2

Statistics accurate as of match played 1 October 2026.

No.	Date	Venue	Opponent	Score	Result	Competition
1	5 September 2025	Olympic City Stadium, Tashkent, Uzbekistan	Kyrgyzstan	1–0	4–0	2025 CAFA Nations Cup
2	1 October 2026	Pakhtakor Central Stadium, Tashkent, Uzbekistan	Syria	2–0	4–1	Friendly

|}

== Honours ==
Nasaf

- Uzbekistan Super League: 2024
- Uzbekistan Cup winners: 2021, 2022, 2023
- Uzbekistan Super Cup winners: 2024, 2025, runner-up: 2022
- AFC Cup runner-up: 2021

Uzbekistan

- FIFA Series Runner-Up: 2026
