= 2022 Uzbekistan Cup =

2022 O'zbekiston Kubogi
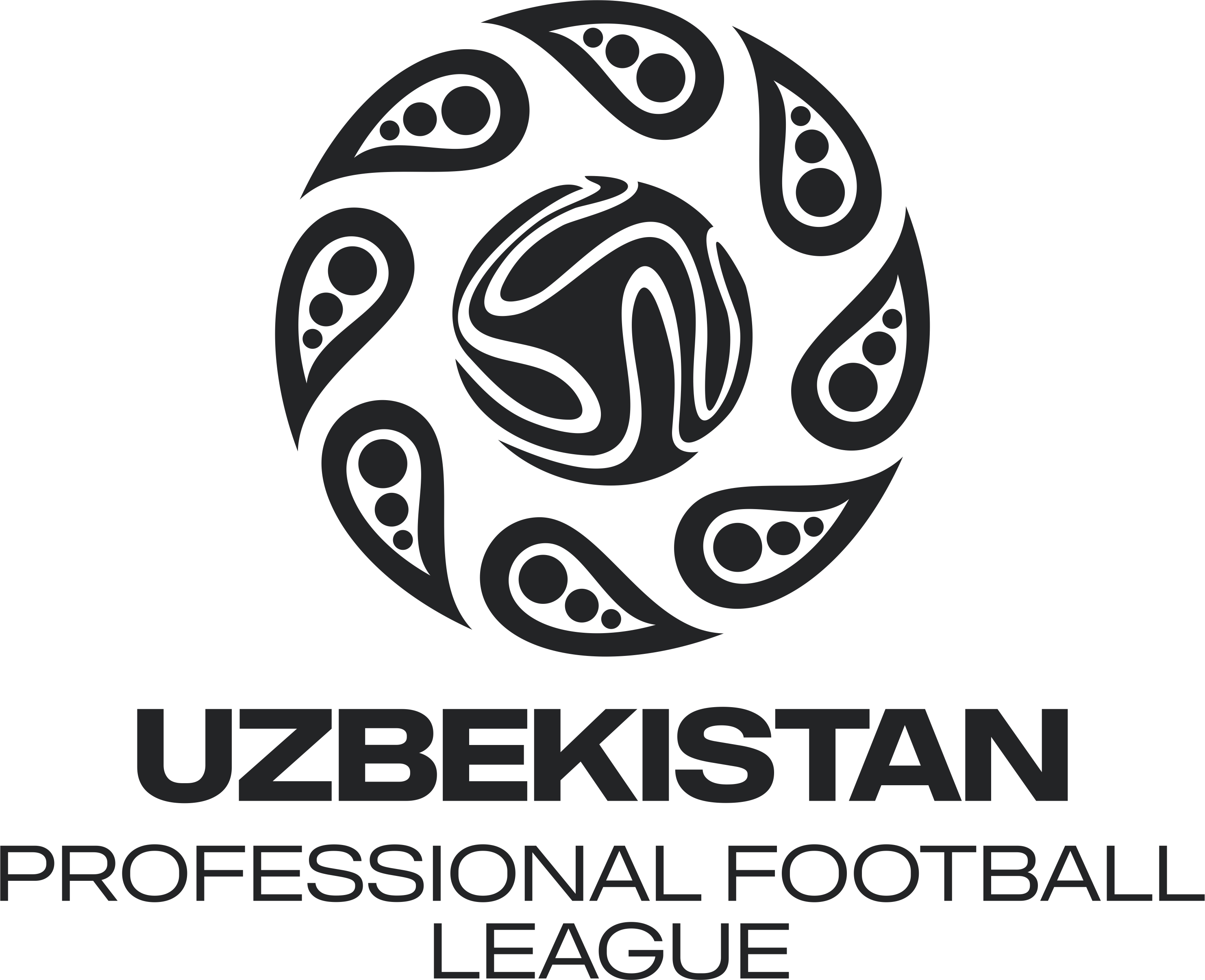

Tournament details
- Country: Uzbekistan
- Dates: 23 March – 30 October
- Teams: 39

Final positions
- Champions: Nasaf Qarshi
- Runners-up: Navbahor Namangan

Tournament statistics
- Matches played: 75
- Goals scored: 190 (2.53 per match)
- Top goal scorer: Khumoyun Murtozoyev

2022 Uzbekistan Cup (in Uzbek: Футбол бўйича 2022-йилги Ўзбекистон Кубоги) was the 30th season of the annual Uzbekistan Cup tournament and served as the final stage of the national football cup competition. The winner of the Cup earned the right to participate in the 2023–24 AFC Champions League. The defending champions were Nasaf.

The final match was held on October 30 in Bukhara at Buxoro Arena stadium. The tournament began on March 23 and concluded on October 30, 2022. The team Nasaf Qarshi from defeated Navbahor in the final to win their third title (second consecutive).

== Format ==
The tournament is divided into three stages: qualifying, group stage and playoffs.

- 15 teams participated in the qualifying round, 2 of which advanced to the second round
- 24 teams played in the group stage, 14 teams advanced to the third round
- 16 teams participated in the play-off round (2 from the Champions League and 14 from the group stage).

| First qualifying round: 14 teams participated | Second qualifying round: 1 team qualified directly | Third qualifying round: 4 teams participated | Group stage: 22 clubs | Knockout: 2 clubs |
| Andijon II; Aral; Binokor; Doʻstlik; Doʻstlik Toshkent; Keles; FC Kumkurgan-1977; Lochin; Lokomotiv BFK; Neftgazmontaj; Paxtakor-79; Chigʻatoy; Shahrixonchi; Unired FC | Denov | | OKMK; Andijan; Aral samali; Bunyodkor PFK; Buxoro; Gʻijduvon; Dinamo; Zomin; Kokand 1912; Qizilqum; Lokomotiv; Mashʼal; Metallurg Bekobod; Navbahor; Neftchi; Olimpik Toshkent; Soʻgʻdiyona; Surxon; Turon (Yaypan); Xorezm; Shoʻrtan; Yangiyer | Nasaf; Paxtakor |

== First qualifying round ==
The draw for the first qualifying round was held on 19 March 2022.

| 23 March 2022 | Lochin | 3–1 | Neftgazmontaj |
| | | Soccerway |

| 23 March 2022 | Lokomotiv BFK | 0–1 | Dostlik Oltiariq |
| | | Soccerway |

| 23 March 2022 | Andijan II | 1–1 (4–3 p) | Dostlik |
| | | Soccerway |

| 23 March 2022 | Shahrixonchi | 2–1 | Chigatoy |
| | | Soccerway |

| 23 March 2022 | Paxtakor-79 | 2–4 | Unired |
| | | Soccerway |

| 23 March 2022 | Qumqorgon | 3–0 | Binokor |
| | | Soccerway |

| 23 March 2022 | Keles | 0–3 | Aral |
| | | Soccerway |

== Second qualifying round ==
The draw for the second qualifying round was held on 23 March 2022. The seven teams which advance from the first qualifying round and Denov who has received a bye for first round play in this round.

| 25 March 2022 | Qumqorgon | 4–3 | Lochin |
| | | Soccerway |

| 25 March 2022 | Unired | 3–2 | Shahrixonchi |
| | | Soccerway |

| 25 March 2022 | Aral | 1–2 | Andijan II |
| | | Soccerway |

| 25 March 2022 | Denov | 0–2 | Dostlik Oltiariq |
| | | Soccerway |

== Third qualifying round ==
The draw for the third qualifying round was held on 25 March 2022. The four teams which advance from the second qualifying round play in this round.

| 27 March 2022 | Qumqorgon | 0–3 | Dostlik Oltiariq |
| | | Soccerway |

| 28 March 2022 | Andijan II | 1–0 | Unired |
| | | Soccerway |

== Group stage ==
The winners and runners-up of each group and the two best third-placed teams among all groups advanced to the knockout stage..

=== Group A ===
| Pos | Team | Pld | W | D | L | GF | GA | GD | Pts | Qualification |
|---|---|---|---|---|---|---|---|---|---|---|
| 1 | Navbahor | 3 | 3 | 0 | 0 | 5 | 0 | +5 | 9 | Knockout stage |
| 2 | Qizilqum | 3 | 1 | 1 | 1 | 1 | 2 | −1 | 4 | Knockout stage |
| 3 | Neftchi | 3 | 1 | 0 | 2 | 2 | 3 | −1 | 3 | |
| 4 | Dinamo Samarqand | 3 | 0 | 1 | 2 | 0 | 3 | −3 | 1 | |

Updated to match(es) played on April 18, 2022. Source: Soccerway

=== Group B ===
| Pos | Team | Pld | W | D | L | GF | GA | GD | Pts | |
|---|---|---|---|---|---|---|---|---|---|---|
| 1 | AGMK | 3 | 2 | 1 | 0 | 8 | 2 | +6 | 7 | Knockout stage |
| 2 | Lokomotiv | 3 | 1 | 2 | 0 | 5 | 4 | +1 | 5 | Knockout stage |
| 3 | FK Zaamin | 3 | 1 | 1 | 1 | 6 | 7 | −1 | 4 | |
| 4 | Xorazm | 3 | 0 | 0 | 3 | 2 | 8 | −6 | 0 | |

Updated to match(es) played on April 19, 2022. Source: Soccerway

=== Group D ===
| Pos | Team | Pld | W | D | L | GF | GA | GD | Pts | Qualification |
|---|---|---|---|---|---|---|---|---|---|---|
| 1 | FK Kokand 1912 | 3 | 3 | 0 | 0 | 12 | 1 | +11 | 9 | Knockout stage |
| 2 | Mash'al | 3 | 1 | 1 | 1 | 3 | 5 | −2 | 4 | Knockout stage |
| 3 | G'ijduvon | 3 | 0 | 2 | 1 | 1 | 5 | −4 | 2 | |
| 4 | Dostlik Oltiariq | 3 | 0 | 1 | 2 | 3 | 8 | −5 | 1 | |

Updated to match(es) played on April 20, 2022. Source: Soccerway

=== Group E ===
| Pos | Team | Pld | W | D | L | GF | GA | GD | Pts | Qualification |
|---|---|---|---|---|---|---|---|---|---|---|
| 1 | Sogdiana | 3 | 2 | 1 | 0 | 7 | 1 | +6 | 7 | Knockout stage |
| 2 | FK Andijon | 3 | 1 | 1 | 1 | 4 | 5 | −1 | 4 (Note: The match between Orol Nukus and Andijon was cancelled due to Andijon was unable to travel to Nukus due to financial difficulties. As a result Orol Nukus were given a 3–0 victory.) | Knockout stage |
| 3 | FK Orol Nukus | 3 | 1 | 0 | 2 | 3 | 4 | −1 | 3 | |
| 4 | FK Yangiyer | 3 | 1 | 0 | 2 | 4 | 8 | −4 | 3 | |

Updated to match(es) played on April 20, 2022. Source: Soccerway

=== Group F ===
| Pos | Team | Pld | W | D | L | GF | GA | GD | Pts | Qualification |
|---|---|---|---|---|---|---|---|---|---|---|
| 1 | Turon | 3 | 2 | 0 | 1 | 6 | 6 | 0 | 6 | Knockout stage |
| 2 | Olympic | 3 | 1 | 1 | 1 | 6 | 3 | +3 | 4 | Knockout stage |
| 3 | Sho'rtan Gʻuzor | 3 | 1 | 1 | 1 | 5 | 5 | 0 | 4 | Knockout stage |
| 4 | Andijan II | 3 | 1 | 0 | 2 | 1 | 4 | −3 | 3 | |

Updated to match(es) played on April 21, 2022. Source: Soccerway

=== Group G ===
| Pos | Team | Pld | W | D | L | GF | GA | GD | Pts | Qualification |
|---|---|---|---|---|---|---|---|---|---|---|
| 1 | Bunyodkor | 3 | 2 | 1 | 0 | 9 | 2 | +7 | 7 | Knockout stage |
| 2 | Metallurg | 3 | 1 | 1 | 1 | 4 | 5 | −1 | 4 (Note: Head to Head criteria) | Knockout stage |
| 3 | Surkhon | 3 | 1 | 1 | 1 | 2 | 1 | +1 | 4 | Knockout stage |
| 4 | Nurafshon | 3 | 0 | 1 | 2 | 1 | 8 | −7 | 1 | |

Updated to match(es) played on April 21, 2022. Source: Soccerway

=== Ranking of third-placed teams ===
| Pos | Grp | Team | Pld | W | D | L | GF | GA | GD | Pts | Qualification |
|---|---|---|---|---|---|---|---|---|---|---|---|
| 1 | G | Surkhon | 3 | 1 | 1 | 1 | 2 | 1 | +1 | 4 | Advance to knockout stage |
| 2 | F | Sho'rtan Gʻuzor | 3 | 1 | 1 | 1 | 5 | 5 | 0 | 4 | Advance to knockout stage |
| 3 | B | FK Zaamin | 3 | 1 | 1 | 1 | 6 | 7 | −1 | 4 | |
| 4 | E | FK Orol Nukus | 3 | 1 | 0 | 2 | 3 | 4 | −1 | 3 | |
| 5 | A | Neftchi | 3 | 1 | 0 | 2 | 2 | 3 | −1 | 3 | |
| 6 | D | G'ijduvon | 3 | 0 | 2 | 1 | 1 | 5 | −4 | 2 | |

Updated to match(es) played on April 21, 2022. Source: Soccerway
Rules for classification: 1) Points; 2) Goal difference; 3) Goals scored; 4) Drawing of lots.

== Knockout stage ==
In the knockout stage, each tie will be played as a single match. The winners, runners-up and the two best third-placed teams from the group stage will join the two participating clubs in the group stage of the 2022 AFC Champions League, Pakhtakor and Nasaf.

=== Qualified Teams ===
Pot 1

- Pakhtakor
- Nasaf
- Navbahor
- AGMK
- FK Kokand 1912
- Sogdiana
- Turon
- Bunyodkor

Pot 2

- Qizilqum
- Lokomotiv
- Mash'al
- FK Andijon
- Olympic
- Metallurg
- Surkhon
- Sho'rtan Gʻuzor

=== Round of 16 ===
The draw will held on 28 April 2022. For the draw the winners of the group will be in a separate pot, as well as with clubs that participate in the group stage of the AFC Champions League. The matches have been scheduled from August 21 to 25.

=== Quarter-finals ===
The matches have been scheduled from September 2 to 3.

=== Semi-finals ===
The matches have been scheduled from October 13 to 14.

=== Final ===
| 30 October 2022 | FC Nasaf | 2–1 (a.e.t.) | Navbahor |
| | | Final |

The cup winner qualifies for a place in the 2023–24 AFC Champions League.
