= 2021 Uzbekistan Cup =

2021 O'zbekiston Kubogi
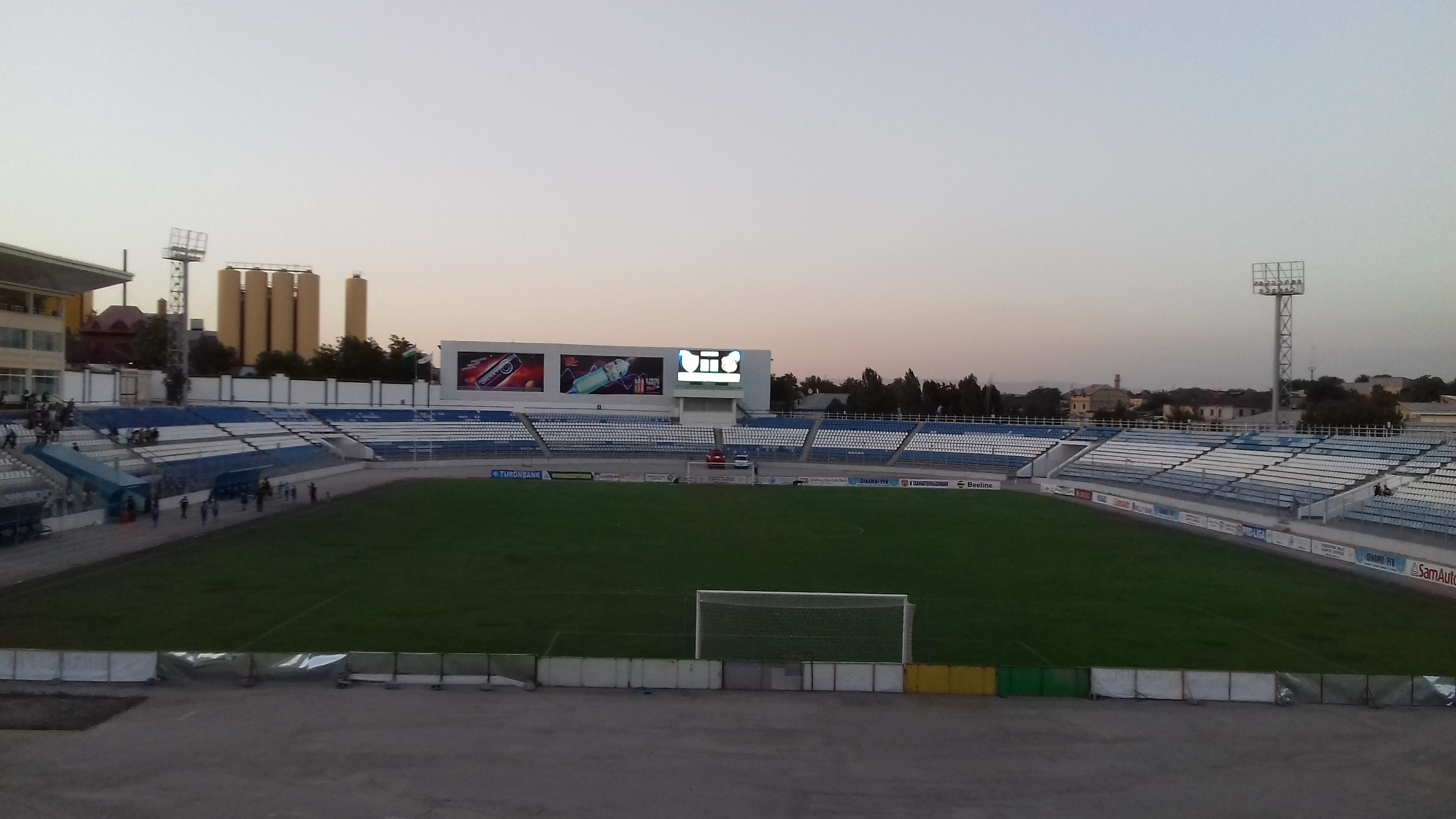
- Dinamo Samarkand Stadium

Tournament details
- Country: Uzbekistan
- Dates: 28 March – 4 December

Final positions
- Champions: Nasaf Qarshi
- Runners-up: Pakhtakor

Tournament statistics
- Matches played: 59
- Goals scored: 204 (3.46 per match)
- Top goal scorer: Muhammad Odilov (6 goals)

2021 Uzbekistan Cup (in Uzbek: Футбол бўйича 2021-йилги Ўзбекистон Кубоги) was the 29th season of the annual Uzbekistan Cup, the knockout football cup competition of Uzbekistan. Cup winner Nasaf Qarshi qualifies for 2022 AFC Champions League.

== First qualifying round ==
28 March 2021	Rubin	1–1 (4–2 p)	Lokomotiv-BFK
		Soccerway

28 March 2021	G'ijduvon	3–1	Zhomboy
		Soccerway

28 March 2021	FK Zaamin	6–0	Lochin
		Soccerway

28 March 2021	Neftgazmontaj	4–4 (a.e.t.) (1–4 p)	Chigatoy
		Soccerway

== Second qualifying round ==
4 April 2021	G'ijduvon	0–1	Rubin
		Soccerway

4 April 2021	Chigatoy	1–3	FK Zaamin
		Soccerway

== Third qualifying round ==
13 April 2021	Chigatoy	1–3	G'ijduvon
		Soccerway

13 April 2021	FK Zaamin	0–1	Rubin
		Soccerway

== Group stage ==
=== Group A ===
Pos	Team	Pld	W	D	L	GF	GA	GD	Pts	Qualification
1	Lokomotiv	3	3	0	0	9	2	+7	9	Knockout stage
2	Turon	3	2	0	1	5	3	+2	6	Knockout stage
3	FK Andijon	3	0	1	2	2	4	−2	1	
4	FK Orol Nukus	3	0	1	2	3	10	−7	1	

Source: Soccerway

=== Group B ===
Pos	Team	Pld	W	D	L	GF	GA	GD	Pts	Qualification
1	Dinamo Samarqand	3	2	1	0	9	2	+7	7	Knockout stage
2	Surkhon	3	2	0	1	9	7	+2	6	Knockout stage
3	Nurafshon	3	0	2	1	5	8	−3	2	
4	G'ijduvon	3	0	1	2	4	10	−6	1	

Source: Soccerway

=== Group D ===
Pos	Team	Pld	W	D	L	GF	GA	GD	Pts	Qualification
1	Navbahor	3	3	0	0	6	1	+5	9	Knockout stage
2	Olympic	3	2	0	1	9	3	+6	6	Knockout stage
3	FC Oqtepa	3	1	0	2	6	9	−3	3	
4	FK Zaamin	3	0	0	3	3	11	−8	0	

Source: Soccerway

=== Group E ===
Pos	Team	Pld	W	D	L	GF	GA	GD	Pts	Qualification
1	Nasaf	3	1	2	0	7	3	+4	5	Knockout stage
2	Sogdiana	3	1	2	0	7	4	+3	5	Knockout stage
3	Bunyodkor	3	1	2	0	12	2	+10	5	Knockout stage
4	Rubin	3	0	0	3	1	18	−17	0	

Source: Soccerway

=== Group F ===
Pos	Team	Pld	W	D	L	GF	GA	GD	Pts	Qualification
1	Mash'al	3	2	0	1	6	4	+2	6	Knockout stage
2	Metallurg	3	2	0	1	5	2	+3	6	Knockout stage
3	FK Yangiyer	3	1	0	2	2	5	−3	3	
4	FK Kokand 1912	3	1	0	2	4	6	−2	3	

Source: Soccerway

=== Group G ===
Pos	Team	Pld	W	D	L	GF	GA	GD	Pts	Qualification
1	Sho'rtan Gʻuzor	3	2	1	0	5	1	+4	7	Knockout stage
2	Qizilqum	3	2	0	1	5	2	+3	6	Knockout stage
3	Neftchi	3	1	1	1	3	2	+1	4	Knockout stage
4	Xorazm	3	0	0	3	3	11	−8	0	

Source: Soccerway

== Round of 16 ==
17 August 2021	Surkhon (1)	1–0	Mash'al (1)
	Pirimov 6'	Soccerway

18 August 2021	Sho'rtan Gʻuzor (2)	1–2	Qizilqum (1)
	Jumayev 12'	Soccerway	Kenzabaev 52', 61' (pen.)

18 August 2021	Dinamo Samarqand (2)	2–2 (a.e.t.)	Olympic
	Ahmedov 68'; Sydorenko 120'	Soccerway	Jiyanov 65'; Begimov 96'

19 August 2021	Nasaf (1)	5–2	Metallurg (1)
	Kaluđerović 12', 54'; Norchayev 66', 75', 86'	Soccerway	Tadjiev 33'; Rakhmatullaev 43'

19 August 2021	Pakhtakor (1)	1–0	Turon (1)
	Erkinov 90'	Soccerway

19 August 2021	AGMK (1)	6–1	Neftchi (2)
	Boakye 10', 36', 66'; Fortes 30'; Tursunov 55'; Olimov 77' (o.g.)	Soccerway	Jesic 38'

20 August 2021	Bunyodkor (1)	1–0	Navbahor (1)
	Ikramov 42'	Soccerway

20 August 2021	Sogdiana (1)	2–1	Lokomotiv (1)
	Nomanov 20'; Kaxramonov 90'	Soccerway	Turapov 43'

== Quarter-finals ==
20 October 2021	Olympic	0–1	Pakhtakor (1)
		Soccerway	Ismailov 64'

28 October 2021	Bunyodkor (1)	2–1	Surkhon (1)
	Izzatov 15'; Gbadamosi 64'	Soccerway	Toshpulatov 77'

28 October 2021	AGMK (1)	3–2	Qizilqum (1)
	Gafurov 27', 73'; Rachmanov 90'	Soccerway	Tukhtakhjaev 56'; Kenzabaev 82'

29 October 2021	Sogdiana (1)	0–1	Nasaf (1)
		Soccerway	Komilov 54' (pen.)

== Semi-finals ==
24 November 2021	Pakhtakor (1)	1–1 (a.e.t.) (5–4 p)	Bunyodkor (1)	Tashkent
		Report		Stadium: Pakhtakor Central Stadium; Referee: A. Shukurullaev

24 November 2021	AGMK (1)	0–2 (a.e.t.)	Nasaf (1)	Olmaliq
		Report		Stadium: AGMK Stadium; Referee: R. Karimov

== Final ==
4 December 2021	Pakhtakor (1)	1–2	Nasaf (1)	Samarqand
16:00		Soccerway		Stadium: [Dinamo Samarkand Stadium; Referee: A. Riskullaev
