= Iran national football team results (2020–present) =

This is a list of the Iran national football team results from 2020 to present.

== 2020 ==
Friendly

8 October 2020
18:00

Uzbekistan	1–2	Iran
Shomurodov 53'	Report	Azmoun 43'; Taremi 51' (pen.)

Pakhtakor Central Stadium, Tashkent
Attendance: 1,000
Referee: Jasur Mukhtarov (Uzbekistan)

Friendly

12 November 2020
18:00

Bosnia and Herzegovina	0–2	Iran
	Report	Rezaei 46'; Ghayedi 90+1'

Koševo City Stadium, Sarajevo
Attendance: 0
Referee: Milovan Milačić (Montenegro)

== 2021 ==
Friendly

30 March 2021
17:30

Iran	3–0	Syria
Kanaanizadegan 2'; Azmoun 38'; Ansarifard 81'	Report

Azadi Stadium, Tehran
Attendance: 0
Referee: Mooud Bonyadifard (Iran)

2022 FIFA World Cup qualifier – Second round

3 June 2021
17:30

Iran	3–1	Hong Kong
Gholizadeh 23'; Amiri 61'; Ansarifard 84'	Report	Orr 85'

Al-Muharraq Stadium, Arad
Attendance: 0
Referee: Adham Makhadmeh (Jordan)

2022 FIFA World Cup qualifier – Second round

7 June 2021
19:30

Iran	3–0	Bahrain
Azmoun 54', 61'; Taremi 79'	Report

National Stadium, Riffa
Attendance: 0
Referee: Fu Ming (China)

2022 FIFA World Cup qualifier – Second round

11 June 2021
17:30

Cambodia	0–10	Iran
	Report	Jahanbakhsh 16' (pen.); Khalilzadeh 22'; Taremi 27'; Sor 32' (o.g.); Mohammadi 58'; Pouraliganji 63'; Ansarifard 77' (pen.); Rezaei 80', 86'; Ghayedi 84'

National Stadium, Riffa
Attendance: 0
Referee: Kim Jong-hyeok (South Korea)

2022 FIFA World Cup qualifier – Second round

15 June 2021
19:30

Iran	1–0	Iraq
Azmoun 35'	Report

Al-Muharraq Stadium, Arad
Attendance: 0
Referee: Ilgiz Tantashev (Uzbekistan)

2022 FIFA World Cup qualifier – Third round

2 September 2021
20:30

Iran	1–0	Syria
Jahanbakhsh 56'	Report

Azadi Stadium, Tehran
Attendance: 0
Referee: Ryuji Sato (Japan)

2022 FIFA World Cup qualifier – Third round

7 September 2021
21:00

Iraq	0–3	Iran
	Report	Jahanbakhsh 3'; Taremi 69'; Gholizadeh 90'

Khalifa International Stadium, Doha
Attendance: 0
Referee: Ma Ning (China)

2022 FIFA World Cup qualifier – Third round

7 October 2021
20:45

United Arab Emirates	0–1	Iran
	Report	Taremi 70'

Zabeel Stadium, Dubai
Attendance: 3,034
Referee: Chris Beath (Australia)

2022 FIFA World Cup qualifier – Third round

12 October 2021
17:00

Iran	1–1	South Korea
Jahanbakhsh 76'	Report	Son Heung-min 48'

Azadi Stadium, Tehran
Attendance: 0
Referee: Ahmed Al-Kaf (Oman)

2022 FIFA World Cup qualifier – Third round

11 November 2021
14:00

Lebanon	1–2	Iran
Saad 37'	Report	Azmoun 90+1'; Nourollahi 90+5'

Saida Municipal Stadium, Sidon
Attendance: 0
Referee: Abdulrahman Al-Jassim (Qatar)

2022 FIFA World Cup qualifier – Third round

16 November 2021
18:00

Syria	0–3	Iran
	Report	Azmoun 33'; Hajsafi 42' (pen.); Gholizadeh 89'

King Abdullah II Stadium, Amman
Attendance: 907
Referee: Ma Ning (China)

== 2022 ==
2022 FIFA World Cup qualifier – Third round

27 January 2022
18:00

Iran	1–0	Iraq
Taremi 48'	Report

Azadi Stadium, Tehran
Attendance: 10,000
Referee: Chris Beath (Australia)

2022 FIFA World Cup qualifier – Third round

1 February 2022
18:00

Iran	1–0	United Arab Emirates
Taremi 44'	Report

Azadi Stadium, Tehran
Attendance: 0
Referee: Ahmed Al-Kaf (Oman)

2022 FIFA World Cup qualifier – Third round

24 March 2022
20:00

South Korea	2–0	Iran
Son Heung-min 45+2'; Kim Young-gwon 63'	Report

World Cup Stadium, Seoul
Attendance: 64,375
Referee: Chris Beath (Australia)

2022 FIFA World Cup qualifier – Third round

29 March 2022
16:00

Iran	2–0	Lebanon
Azmoun 35'; Jahanbakhsh 72'	Report

Imam Reza Stadium, Mashhad
Attendance: 22,453
Referee: Fu Ming (China)

Friendly

12 June 2022
22:20

Iran	1–2	Algeria
Jahanbakhsh 64'	Report	Benayad 44'; Amoura 82'

Jassim bin Hamad Stadium, Doha
Attendance: 250
Referee: Mohammed Al-Shammari (Qatar)

Friendly

23 September 2022
18:00

Iran	1–0	Uruguay
Taremi 79'	Report

NV Arena, Sankt Pölten
Attendance: 400
Referee: Walter Altmann (Austria)

Friendly

27 September 2022
16:30

Iran	1–1	Senegal
Azmoun 64'	Report	Pouraliganji 55' (o.g.)

Motion invest Arena, Maria Enzersdorf
Attendance: 400
Referee: Harald Lechner (Austria)

Friendly

10 November 2022
19:30

Iran	1–0	Nicaragua
Torabi 15'	Report

Azadi Stadium, Tehran
Attendance: 0
Referee: Sadullo Gulmurodi (Tajikistan)

2022 FIFA World Cup – Preliminary round

21 November 2022
16:00

England	6–2	Iran
Bellingham 35'; Saka 43', 62'; Sterling 45+1'; Rashford 71'; Grealish 90'	Report	Taremi 65', 90+13' (pen.)

Khalifa International Stadium, Al-Rayyan
Attendance: 45,334
Referee: Raphael Claus (Brazil)

2022 FIFA World Cup – Preliminary round

25 November 2022
13:00

Wales	0–2	Iran
	Report	Cheshmi 90+8'; Rezaeian 90+11'

Ahmad bin Ali Stadium, Al-Rayyan
Attendance: 40,875
Referee: Mario Escobar (Guatemala)

2022 FIFA World Cup – Preliminary round

29 November 2022
22:00

Iran	0–1	United States
	Report	Pulisic 38'

Al-Thumama Stadium, Doha
Attendance: 42,127
Referee: Antonio Mateu (Spain)

== 2023 ==
Friendly

23 March 2023
20:30

Iran	1–1	Russia
Taremi 47' (pen.)	Report	Miranchuk 28' (pen.)

Azadi Stadium, Tehran
Attendance: 20,000
Referee: Ilgiz Tantashev (Uzbekistan)

Friendly

28 March 2023
20:30

Iran	2–1	Kenya
Mohebbi 76'; Rezaeian 84'	Report	Olunga 51'

Azadi Stadium, Tehran
Attendance: 25,000
Referee: Zaid Thamer (Iraq)

2023 CAFA Nations Cup – Preliminary round

13 June 2023
21:00

Iran	6–1	Afghanistan
Taremi 21', 28' (pen.), 52'; Azmoun 20'; Jahanbakhsh 45'; Asadi 67'	Report	Noor 57'

Dolen Omurzakov Stadium, Bishkek
Attendance: 250
Referee: Sadullo Gulmurodi (Tajikistan)

2023 CAFA Nations Cup – Preliminary round

16 June 2023
21:00

Kyrgyzstan	1–5	Iran
Murzayev 52'	Report	Taremi 34', 39' (pen.), 56'; Azmoun 66', 79'

Dolen Omurzakov Stadium, Bishkek
Attendance: 18,000
Referee: Akhrol Risqullaev (Uzbekistan)

2023 CAFA Nations Cup – Final

20 June 2023
20:30

Uzbekistan	0–1	Iran
	Report	Azmoun 48'

Milliy Stadium, Tashkent
Attendance: 34,000
Referee: Kirill Levnikov (Russia)

Friendly

7 September 2023
19:00

Bulgaria	0–1	Iran
	Report	Mohebbi 14'

Stadion Hristo Botev, Plovdiv
Attendance: 34,000
Referee: Lazar Lukić (Serbia)

Friendly

12 September 2023
19:00

Iran	4–0	Angola
Taremi 8', 16'; Moharrami 21'; Moghanloo 87'	Report

Azadi Stadium, Tehran
Attendance: 0
Referee: Mohammed Al-Hoaish (Saudi Arabia)

2023 Jordan International Tournament – Semifinal

13 October 2023
21:00

Jordan	1–3	Iran
Al-Naimat 74'	Report	Azmoun 6'; Taremi 27'; Mohammadi 90+4'

Amman International Stadium, Amman
Attendance: 3,400
Referee: Mohammed Al-Hoaish (Saudi Arabia)

2023 Jordan International Tournament – Final

17 October 2023
21:00

Iran	4–0	Qatar
Kanaanizadegan 69', 79'; Jahanbakhsh 73'; Azmoun 75'	Report

Amman International Stadium, Amman
Attendance: 1,500
Referee: Ahmad Ibrahim (Jordan)

2026 FIFA World Cup qualifier – Second round

16 November 2023
18:00

Iran	4–0	Hong Kong
Azmoun 12', 15'; Taremi 87'; Rezaeian 90+2'	Report

Azadi Stadium, Tehran
Attendance: 6,191
Referee: Nazmi Nasaruddin (Malaysia)

2026 FIFA World Cup qualifier – Second round

21 November 2023
18:00

Uzbekistan	2–2	Iran
Urunov 52'; Sergeev 83'	Report	Rezaeian 14'; Taremi 38'

Milliy Stadium, Tashkent
Attendance: 32,551
Referee: Mohammed Abdulla (United Arab Emirates)

== 2024 ==
Friendly

5 January 2024
18:00

Iran	2–1	Burkina Faso
Taremi 42'; Ebrahimi 71'	Report	Konaté 16'

Olympic Stadium, Kish
Attendance: 7,000
Referee: Yousif Saeed (Iraq)

Friendly

9 January 2024
18:30

Indonesia	0–5	Iran
	Report	Ghoddos 3'; Cheshmi 22'; Moghanloo 36'; Ghayedi 70', 87'

Al-Rayyan Training Ground, Al-Rayyan
Attendance: 0
Referee: Mohammed Braheh (Qatar)

2023 AFC Asian Cup – Preliminary round

14 January 2024
20:30

Iran	4–1	Palestine
Ansarifard 2'; Khalilzadeh 12'; Ghayedi 38'; Azmoun 55'	Report	Seyam 45+6'

Education City Stadium, Al-Rayyan
Attendance: 27,691
Referee: Abdulrahman Al-Jassim (Qatar)

2023 AFC Asian Cup – Preliminary round

19 January 2024
20:30

Hong Kong	0–1	Iran
	Report	Ghayedi 24'

Khalifa International Stadium, Al-Rayyan
Attendance: 36,412
Referee: Hanna Hattab (Syria)

2023 AFC Asian Cup – Preliminary round

23 January 2024
18:00

Iran	2–1	United Arab Emirates
Taremi 26', 65'	Report	Al-Ghassani 90+3'

Education City Stadium, Al-Rayyan
Attendance: 34,259
Referee: Ilgiz Tantashev (Uzbekistan)

2023 AFC Asian Cup – Round of 16

31 January 2024
19:00

Iran	1–1	Syria
Taremi 34' (pen.)	Report	Khribin 64' (pen.)
Penalties
Ansarifard (penalty scored); Rezaeian (penalty scored); Ebrahimi (penalty scored); Torabi (penalty scored); Hajsafi (penalty scored)	5–3	(penalty scored) Sabbag; (penalty missed) Youssef; (penalty scored) Ousou; (penalty scored) Al-Dali

Abdullah bin Khalifa Stadium, Doha
Attendance: 8,720
Referee: Kim Jong-hyeok (South Korea)

2023 AFC Asian Cup – Quarterfinal

3 February 2024
14:30

Iran	2–1	Japan
Mohebbi 55'; Jahanbakhsh 90+6' (pen.)	Report	Morita 28'

Education City Stadium, Al-Rayyan
Attendance: 35,640
Referee: Ma Ning (China)

2023 AFC Asian Cup – Semifinal

7 February 2024
18:00

Iran	2–3	Qatar
Azmoun 4'; Jahanbakhsh 51' (pen.)	Report	Gaber 17'; Afif 43'; Ali 82'

Al-Thumama Stadium, Doha
Attendance: 40,342
Referee: Ahmad Al-Ali (Kuwait)

2026 FIFA World Cup qualifier – Second round

21 March 2024
19:30

Iran	5–0	Turkmenistan
Kanaanizadegan 10', 48'; Azmoun 13'; Mohebbi 56'; Nourafkan 90+2'	Report

Azadi Stadium, Tehran
Attendance: 23,109
Referee: Yusuke Araki (Japan)

2026 FIFA World Cup qualifier – Second round

26 March 2024
20:00

Turkmenistan	0–1	Iran
	Report	Ghayedi 45+5'

Ashgabat Stadium, Ashgabat
Attendance: 10,230
Referee: Sivakorn Pu-udom (Thailand)

2026 FIFA World Cup qualifier – Second round

6 June 2024
20:00

Hong Kong	2–4	Iran
Ma Hei Wai 14'; Pinto 59'	Report	Taremi 12' (pen.), 34' (pen.), 56'; Azmoun 65'

Hong Kong Stadium, Hong Kong
Attendance: 9,992
Referee: Qasim Al-Hatmi (Oman)

2026 FIFA World Cup qualifier – Second round

11 June 2024
20:30

Iran	0–0	Uzbekistan
	Report

Azadi Stadium, Tehran
Attendance: 15,403
Referee: Kim Jong-hyeok (South Korea)

2026 FIFA World Cup qualifier – Third round

5 September 2024
19:30

Iran	1–0	Kyrgyzstan
Taremi 34'	Report

Fooladshahr Stadium, Fooladshahr
Attendance: 12,077
Referee: Yusuke Araki (Japan)

2026 FIFA World Cup qualifier – Third round

10 September 2024
20:00

United Arab Emirates	0–1	Iran
	Report	Ghayedi 45+3'

Hazza bin Zayed Stadium, Al-Ain
Attendance: 17,826
Referee: Kim Jong-hyeok (South Korea)

2026 FIFA World Cup qualifier – Third round

10 October 2024
19:00

Uzbekistan	0–0	Iran
	Report

Milliy Stadium, Tashkent
Attendance: 33,829
Referee: Shaun Evans (Australia)

2026 FIFA World Cup qualifier – Third round

15 October 2024
20:00

Iran	4–1	Qatar
Azmoun 42', 48'; Mohebbi 65', 90+8'	Report	Ali 17'

Rashid Stadium, Dubai
Attendance: 7,890
Referee: Yusuke Araki (Japan)

2026 FIFA World Cup qualifier – Third round

14 November 2024
19:00

North Korea	2–3	Iran
Taremi 56' (o.g.); Kim Yu-song 59'	Report	Ghayedi 29'; Mohebbi 41', 45'

New Laos National Stadium, Vientiane
Attendance: 100
Referee: Sadullo Gulmurodi (Tajikistan)

2026 FIFA World Cup qualifier – Third round

19 November 2024
20:00

Kyrgyzstan	2–3	Iran
Kojo 51', 64' (pen.)	Report	Taremi 12'; Hardani 33'; Azmoun 76'

Dolen Omurzakov Stadium, Bishkek
Attendance: 10,021
Referee: Ma Ning (China)

== 2025 ==
2026 FIFA World Cup qualifier – Third round

20 March 2025
19:30

Iran	2–0	United Arab Emirates
Azmoun 45+27'; Mohebbi 70'	Report

Azadi Stadium, Tehran
Attendance: 20,469
Referee: Ko Hyung-jin (South Korea)

2026 FIFA World Cup qualifier – Third round

25 March 2025
19:30

Iran	2–2	Uzbekistan
Taremi 52', 83'	Report	Erkinov 16'; Fayzullaev 53'

Azadi Stadium, Tehran
Attendance: 36,702
Referee: Ahmed Al-Kaf (Oman)

2026 FIFA World Cup qualifier – Third round

5 June 2025
21:15

Qatar	1–0	Iran
Ró-Ró 41'	Report

Jassim bin Hamad Stadium, Doha
Attendance: 8,925
Referee: Mohammed Al-Hoaish (Saudi Arabia)

2026 FIFA World Cup qualifier – Third round

10 June 2025
19:30

Iran	3–0	North Korea
Mohebbi 74'; Taremi 77'; Hosseinzadeh 90+3'	Report

Azadi Stadium, Tehran
Attendance: 16,803
Referee: Nazmi Nasaruddin (Malaysia)

2025 CAFA Nations Cup – Preliminary round

29 August 2025
17:00

Iran	3–1	Afghanistan
Aliyari 26', 64'; Hosseinzadeh 36'	Report	Musawi 21'

Hisor Central Stadium, Hisar
Attendance: 4,520
Referee: Sanzhar Zhakypbekov (Kyrgyzstan)

2025 CAFA Nations Cup – Preliminary round

1 September 2025
17:00

India	0–3	Iran
	Report	Hosseinzadeh 59'; Alipour 89'; Taremi 90+6'

Hisor Central Stadium, Hisar
Attendance: 1,050
Referee: Ilgiz Tantashev (Uzbekistan)

2025 CAFA Nations Cup – Preliminary round

4 September 2025
20:30

Tajikistan	2–2	Iran
Samiev 55'; Dzhuraboyev 76'	Report	Mohebbi 38'; Mohebbi 47'

Hisor Central Stadium, Hisar
Attendance: 18,000
Referee: Akhrol Riskullaev (Uzbekistan)

2025 CAFA Nations Cup – Final

8 September 2025
19:30

Uzbekistan	1–0 (a.e.t.)	Iran
Alijonov 120'	Report

Olympic City Stadium, Tashkent
Attendance: 11,482
Referee: Nurzatbek Abdikadirov (Kyrgyzstan)

Friendly

10 October 2025
20:00

Russia	2–1	Iran
Vorobyov 22'; Batrakov 70'	Report	Hosseinzadeh 48'

Volgograd Arena, Volgograd
Attendance: 42,387
Referee: Nikola Dabanović (Montenegro)

Friendly

14 October 2025
19:00

Iran	2–0	Tanzania
Hosseinzadeh 17' (pen.); Mohebbi 26'	Report

Rashid Stadium, Dubai
Attendance: 4,200
Referee: Adel Al-Naqbi (United Arab Emirates)

2025 Al-Ain International Cup – Semifinal

13 November 2025
20:00

Iran	0–0	Cape Verde
	Report
Penalties
Nourafkan (penalty scored); Alipour (penalty scored); Mohebbi (penalty scored); Ezzatollahi (penalty scored); Taremi (penalty scored)	5–4	(penalty scored) Rodrigues; (penalty scored) Diney; (penalty scored) Moreira; (penalty missed) Duarte; (penalty scored) Arcanjo

Hazza bin Zayed Stadium, Al-Ain
Attendance: 634
Referee: Mohamed Al-Harmoodi (United Arab Emirates)

2025 Al-Ain International Cup – Final

18 November 2025
20:00

Iran	0–0	Uzbekistan
	Report
Penalties
Nourafkan (penalty scored); Ghorbani (penalty scored); Mohebbi (penalty missed); Hosseini (penalty scored); Mohammadi (penalty missed)	3–4	(penalty scored) Shomurodov; (penalty missed) Iskanderov; (penalty scored) Abdullaev; (penalty scored) Ashurmatov; (penalty scored) Mozgovoy

Hazza bin Zayed Stadium, Al-Ain
Attendance: 4,700
Referee: Adel Al-Naqbi (United Arab Emirates)

== 2026 ==
2026 Jordan International Tournament

27 March 2026
15:30

Iran	1–2	Nigeria
Taremi 67'	Report	Simon 6'; Adams 51'

Mardan Sports Complex, Antalya
Attendance: 0
Referee: Cihan Aydın (Turkey)

2026 Jordan International Tournament

31 March 2026
16:00

Costa Rica	0–5	Iran
	Report	Gholizadeh 11'; Taremi 19' (pen.), 34' (pen.); Mohebbi 31'; Ghayedi 54'

Mardan Sports Complex, Antalya
Attendance: 200
Referee: Cihan Aydın (Turkey)

Friendly

29 May 2026
18:30

Iran	3–1	Gambia
Yousefi 47'; Rezaeian 59'; Taremi 68'	Report	Colley 42'

Mardan Sports Complex, Antalya
Attendance: 750
Referee: Atilla Karaoğlan (Turkey)

Friendly

4 June 2026
19:30

Iran	2–0	Mali
Ezzatollahi 12'; Rezaeian 55'	Report

Mardan Sports Complex, Antalya
Attendance: 0

2026 FIFA World Cup – Preliminary round

15 June 2026
18:00

Iran	2–2	New Zealand
Rezaeian 32'; Mohebbi 64'	Report	Just 7', 54'

SoFi Stadium, Inglewood
Attendance: 70,108
Referee: César Arturo Ramos (Mexico)

2026 FIFA World Cup – Preliminary round

21 June 2026
12:00

Belgium	0–0	Iran
	Report

SoFi Stadium, Inglewood
Attendance: 70,317
Referee: Darío Herrera (Argentina)

2026 FIFA World Cup – Preliminary round

26 June 2026
20:00

Egypt	1–1	Iran
Saber 5'	Report	Rezaeian 14'

Lumen Field, Seattle
Attendance: 66,925
Referee: Szymon Marciniak (Poland)

Friendly

24 September 2026
19:00

Uzbekistan	3–1	Iran
Shomurodov 10', 58' (pen.); Norchaev 90+4'	Report	Urozov 49' (o.g.)

Istiqlol Stadium, Fergana
Attendance: 17,978
Referee: Kirill Levnikov (Russia)

Friendly

29 September 2026
21:00

Russia	2–0	Iran
Golovin 21', 36'	Report

Ak Bars Arena, Kazan
Attendance: 34,362
Referee: Ilgiz Tantashev (Uzbekistan)

2026 Basra International Tournament

14 November 2026
18:00

Iran	2–0	Palestine
Azmoun 76'; Hardani 84'	Report

Basra International Stadium, Basra
Referee: Mohanad Qasim (Iraq)

2026 Basra International Tournament

17 November 2026
19:15

Iraq	1–1	Iran
Ali 1'	Report	Hazbavi 83'

Basra International Stadium, Basra
Attendance: 49,742
Referee: Ammar Ashkanani (Kuwait)

== 2027 ==
2027 AFC Asian Cup – Preliminary round

9 January 2027

Iran	v	China

Kingdom Arena, Riyadh

2027 AFC Asian Cup – Preliminary round

13 January 2027

Kyrgyzstan	v	Iran

Al-Shabab Club Stadium, Riyadh

2027 AFC Asian Cup – Preliminary round

18 January 2027

Iran	v	Syria

King Fahd Sports City Stadium, Riyadh

== Statistics ==
=== Results by year ===
Year	Pld	W	D	L	GF	GA	GD
2020	2	2	0	0	4	1	+3
2021	11	10	1	0	31	3	+28
2022	11	6	1	4	12	12	0
2023	11	9	2	0	33	7	+26
2024	18	14	3	1	41	15	+26
2025	12	5	4	3	18	9	+9
2026	11	4	4	3	18	12	+6
Total	76	50	15	11	157	59	+98

=== Managers ===
Name	First match	Last match	Pld	W	D	L	GF	GA	GD
(Croatia) Dragan Skočić	8 October 2020	12 June 2022	18	15	1	2	40	8	+32
(Portugal) Carlos Queiroz	23 September 2022	29 November 2022	6	3	1	2	7	8	–1
(Iran) Amir Ghalenoei	23 March 2023		52	32	13	7	110	43	+67
Total			76	50	15	11	157	59	+98

=== Opponents ===
Team	Pld	W	D	L	GF	GA	GD
Afghanistan	2	2	0	0	9	2	+7
Algeria	1	0	0	1	1	2	–1
Angola	1	1	0	0	4	0	+4
Bahrain	1	1	0	0	3	0	+3
Belgium	1	0	1	0	0	0	0
Bosnia and Herzegovina	1	1	0	0	2	0	+2
Bulgaria	1	1	0	0	1	0	+1
Burkina Faso	1	1	0	0	2	1	+1
Cambodia	1	1	0	0	10	0	+10
Cape Verde	1	0	1	0	0	0	0
Costa Rica	1	1	0	0	5	0	+5
Egypt	1	0	1	0	1	1	0
England	1	0	0	1	2	6	–4
Gambia	1	1	0	0	3	1	+2
Hong Kong	4	4	0	0	12	3	+9
India	1	1	0	0	3	0	+3
Indonesia	1	1	0	0	5	0	+5
Iraq	4	3	1	0	6	1	+5
Japan	1	1	0	0	2	1	+1
Jordan	1	1	0	0	3	1	+2
Kenya	1	1	0	0	2	1	+1
Korea, North	2	2	0	0	6	2	+4
Korea, South	2	0	1	1	1	3	–2
Kyrgyzstan	3	3	0	0	9	3	+6
Lebanon	2	2	0	0	4	1	+3
Mali	1	1	0	0	2	0	+2
New Zealand	1	0	1	0	2	2	0
Nicaragua	1	1	0	0	1	0	+1
Nigeria	1	0	0	1	1	2	–1
Palestine	2	2	0	0	6	1	+5
Qatar	4	2	0	2	10	5	+5
Russia	3	0	1	2	2	5	–3
Senegal	1	0	1	0	1	1	0
Syria	4	3	1	0	8	1	+7
Tajikistan	1	0	1	0	2	2	0
Tanzania	1	1	0	0	2	0	+2
Turkmenistan	2	2	0	0	6	0	+6
United Arab Emirates	5	5	0	0	7	1	+6
United States	1	0	0	1	0	1	–1
Uruguay	1	1	0	0	1	0	+1
Uzbekistan	9	2	5	2	8	9	–1
Wales	1	1	0	0	2	0	+2
Total	76	50	15	11	157	59	+98
