= 2026 Jordan International Tournament =

Tournament details
- Host country: Turkey
- Dates: 27–31 March
- Teams: 4 (from 3 confederations)
- Venue: 1 (in 1 host city)

Final positions
- Champions: Nigeria
- Runners-up: Iran
- Third place: Jordan
- Fourth place: Costa Rica

Tournament statistics
- Matches played: 4
- Goals scored: 22 (5.5 per match)
- Attendance: 0 (0 per match)
- Top scorer(s): (Iran) Mehdi Taremi (3 goals)

The 2026 Jordan International Tournament was a four-way international friendly tournament that was held in Antalya, Turkey for the national teams of Jordan, Iran, Nigeria and Costa Rica, which took place during the March 2026 window of the FIFA International Match Calendar.

Nigeria won after beating Iran 1–2 and drawing 2–2 against Jordan.

Originally, the 2026 addition was supposed to take place in Amman, Jordan with two venues in use (Amman International Stadium and King Abdullah II Stadium), but was subsequently moved to Antalya due to the 2026 Iran war.

== Participants ==
- Jordan
- Iran
- Nigeria
- Costa Rica

== Standings ==
Pos	Team	Pld	W	D	L	GF	GA	GD	Pts
1	Nigeria	2	1	1	0	4	3	+1	4
2	Iran	2	1	0	1	6	2	+4	3
3	Jordan	2	0	2	0	4	4	0	2
4	Costa Rica	2	0	1	1	2	7	−5	1

Source: World Football

== Matches ==
27 March
15:30 UTC+3

Iran	1–2	Nigeria
Taremi 67'	Report	Simon 7'; Adams 51'

Mardan Sports Complex, Antalya
Attendance: 0
Referee: Cihan Aydın (Turkey)
27 March
20:30 UTC+3

Jordan	2–2	Costa Rica
Faisal 50' (pen.); Sabra 76'	Report	Alcócer 84' (pen.); Madrigal 90+1'

Mardan Sports Complex, Antalya
Attendance: 0
Referee: Kadir Sağlam (Turkey)
31 March
15:00 UTC+3

Iran	5–0	Costa Rica
Gholizadeh 11'; Taremi 19' (pen.), 34' (pen.); Mohebi 31'; Ghaedi 54'	Report

Mardan Sports Complex, Antalya
Attendance: 0
Referee: Cihan Aydın (Turkey)
31 March
20:30 UTC+3

Jordan	2–2	Nigeria
Al-Taamari 17'; Al-Dawoud 77'	Report	Simon 25'; Fernandez 41'

Mardan Sports Complex, Antalya
Attendance: 0
Referee: Atilla Karaoğlan (Turkey)

== Goalscorers ==
There were 22 goals scored in 4 matches, for an average of 5.5 goals per match.

3 goals

- (Iran) Mehdi Taremi

2 goals

- (Nigeria) Moses Simon

1 goal

- (Nigeria) Akor Adams
- (Jordan) Baha' Faisal
- (Jordan) Ibrahim Sabra
- (Jordan) Musa Al-Taamari
- (Jordan) Mohammad Al-Dawoud
- (Costa Rica) Josimar Alcócer
- (Costa Rica) Warren Madrigal
- (Iran) Ali Gholizadeh
- (Iran) Mohammad Mohebi
- (Iran) Mohammad Ghaedi
