= Azizbek Turgunboev =

Uzbekistani footballer

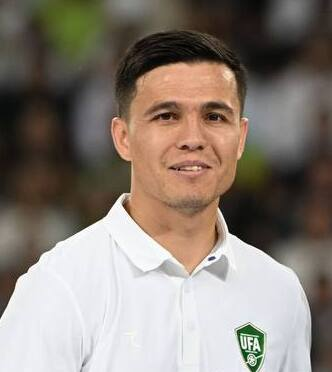
- in 2025

Personal information
- Full name: Azizbek Turgʻunboyev
- Date of birth: 1 October 1994 (age 32)
- Place of birth: Namangan, Uzbekistan
- Height: 1.73 m (5 ft 8 in)
- Position: Winger

Team information
- Current team: Andijon
- Number: 17

Youth career
- –2015: Navbahor

Senior career*
Years	Team	Apps	(Gls)
2015–2020	Navbahor	110	(26)
2021–2023	Pakhtakor	75	(13)
2024–2025	Sivasspor	33	(1)
2025–2026	Pakhtakor	15	(1)
2026–	Andijon	10	(1)

International career^{‡}
2018	Uzbekistan U23	5	(1)
2018–	Uzbekistan	38	(6)
Medal record
Representing Uzbekistan
CAFA Nations Cup
Runner-up	2023 Kyrgyzstan–Uzbekistan	Team
Winner	2025 Tajikistan–Uzbekistan	Team
- * Club domestic league appearances and goals as of 29 July 2026 ‡ National team caps and goals as of 5 September 2025

Azizbek Turgunboev (Uzbek: Azizbek Turgʻunboyev, Russian: Азизбек Тургунбоев; born 1 October 1994) is an Uzbek professional footballer who plays as a winger for Uzbekistan Super League club Andijon and the Uzbekistan national team.

== Career ==
Turgunboev was included in Uzbekistan's squad for the 2019 AFC Asian Cup in the United Arab Emirates, and the 2023 AFC Asian Cup in Qatar.

On 18 February 2026, Pakhtakor announced that Turgunboev had left the club after his contract was cancelled by mutual agreement, allowing him to sign with Andijon.

== Career statistics ==
=== International ===
As of 5 September 2025

Uzbekistan
Year	Apps	Goals
2018	4	0
2019	3	0
2020	3	0
2021	1	0
2022	6	1
2023	8	1
2024	10	2
2025	3	2
Total	36	5

No.	Date	Venue	Opponent	Score	Result	Competition
1.	14 June 2022	Markaziy Stadium, Namangan, Uzbekistan	Thailand	2–0	2–0	2023 AFC Asian Cup qualification
2.	12 September 2023	Mercedes-Benz Stadium, Atlanta, United States	Mexico	2–1	3–3	Friendly
3.	23 January 2024	Al Janoub Stadium, Al Wakrah, Qatar	Australia	1–1	1–1	2023 AFC Asian Cup
4.	30 January 2024	Al Janoub Stadium, Al Wakrah, Qatar	Thailand	1–0	2–1	2023 AFC Asian Cup
5.	10 June 2025	Milliy Stadium, Tashkent, Uzbekistan	Qatar	1–0	3–0	2026 FIFA World Cup qualification
6.	5 September 2025	Olympic City Stadium, Tashkent, Uzbekistan	Kyrgyzstan	4–0	4–0	2025 CAFA Nations Cup
