= 2022 Jordan International Tournament =

Tournament details
- Host country: Jordan
- Dates: 23–26 September
- Teams: 4 (from 1 confederation)
- Venues: 2 (in 1 host city)

Final positions
- Champions: Jordan
- Runners-up: Oman
- Third place: Iraq
- Fourth place: Syria

Tournament statistics
- Matches played: 4
- Goals scored: 6 (1.5 per match)
- Top scorer(s): (Iraq) Aymen Hussein (2 goals)

The 2022 Jordan International Tournament was a football tournament for the national teams of Jordan, Syria, Iraq and Oman, which took place during the September 2022 window of the FIFA International Match Calendar.

Jordan won the tournament by defeating Oman 1–0 in the final.

== Matches ==
Semi-finals
23 September – Amman
Jordan	2
Syria	0
23 September – Amman
Iraq	1 (3)
Oman	1 (4)

Final
26 September – Amman
Jordan	1
Oman	0
Third place
26 September – Amman
Iraq	1
Syria	0

=== Semi-finals ===
23 September 2022
18:00 UTC+3

Iraq	1–1	Oman
Hussein 85'		Al-Malki 82'
Penalties
Hussein (penalty missed); Attwan (penalty scored); Ahmed (penalty scored); Rostam (penalty missed); Adnan (penalty scored); Karim (penalty missed)	3–4	(penalty missed) Al-Yahyaei; (penalty missed) Al-Malki; (penalty scored) Al-Sabhi; (penalty scored) Saleh; (penalty scored) Al-Musalami; (penalty scored) Al-Yahmadi

King Abdullah II Stadium, Amman

23 September 2022
21:00 UTC+3

Jordan	2–0	Syria
Samir 25'; Al-Naimat 43'

King Abdullah II Stadium, Amman

=== Third place match ===
26 September 2022
18:00 UTC+3

Iraq	1–0	Syria
Hussein 27'

Amman International Stadium, Amman

=== Final ===
26 September 2022
21:00 UTC+3

Jordan	1–0	Oman
Haddad 66' (pen.)

Amman International Stadium, Amman

== Winners ==
Jordan International Tournament winners

Jordan

== Top goalscorers ==
2 goals

- (Iraq) Aymen Hussein

1 goal

- (Jordan) Yazan Al-Naimat
- (Jordan) Ihsan Haddad
- (Jordan) Ahmed Samir
- (Oman) Omar Al-Malki
