= Khojimat Erkinov =

Uzbek footballer (born 2001)

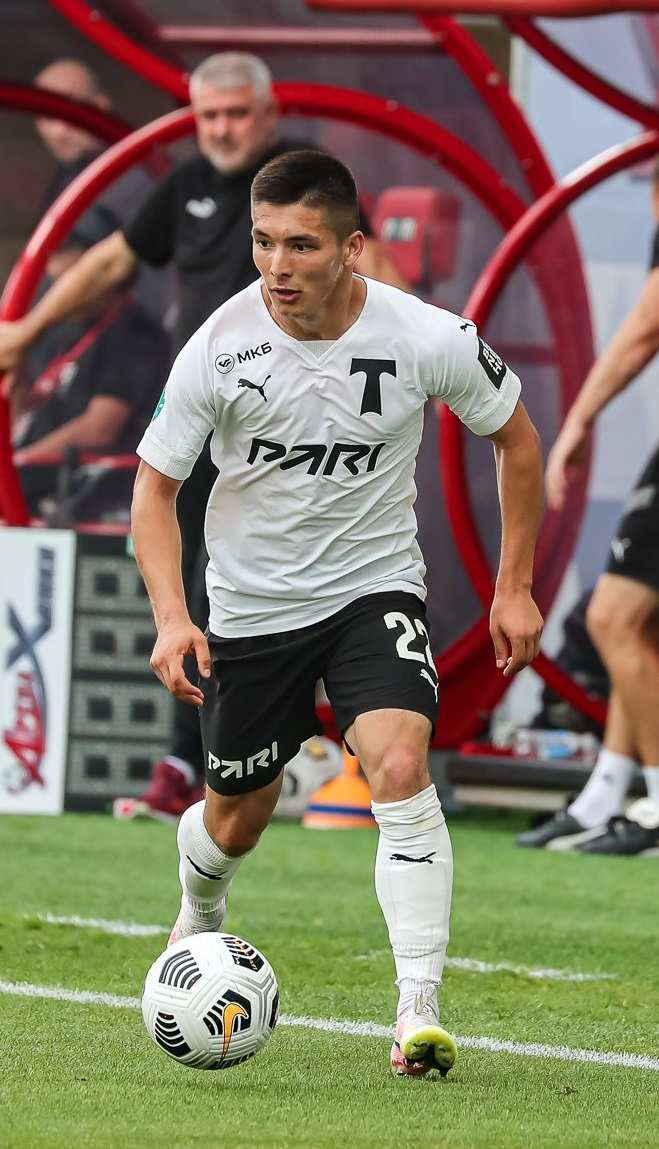

Personal information
- Full name: Khojimat Botir o'g'li Erkinov
- Date of birth: 29 May 2001 (age 25)
- Place of birth: Toshkent, Uzbekistan
- Height: 1.74 m (5 ft 9 in)
- Position: Midfielder

Team information
- Current team: Pakhtakor
- Number: 11

Youth career
- 2011–2019: Pakhtakor

Senior career*
Years	Team	Apps	(Gls)
2019–2022	Pakhtakor	37	(6)
2019	→ Kokand 1912 (loan)	8	(0)
2020	→ AGMK (loan)	10	(1)
2022–2023	Torpedo Moscow	20	(0)
2023	→ Pakhtakor (loan)	9	(2)
2024–2025	Al Wahda	32	(1)
2025–	Pakhtakor	27	(3)

International career^{‡}
2018–2019	Uzbekistan U-19	2	(1)
2020–	Uzbekistan	42	(7)
2021–2024	Uzbekistan U-23	20	(2)
Medal record
Representing Uzbekistan
Men's football
CAFA Nations Cup
Runner-up	2023 Kyrgyzstan–Uzbekistan	Team
Winner	2025 Tajikistan–Uzbekistan	Team
AFC U-23 Asian Cup
Silver medal – second place	2022 Uzbekistan	Team
Silver medal – second place	2024 Qatar	Team
Asian Games
Bronze medal – third place	2022 Hangzhou	Team
- * Club domestic league appearances and goals as of 28 July 2026 ‡ National team caps and goals as of 18 September 2026

Khojimat Erkinov (Uzbek: Xojimat Botir ugli Erkinov; born 29 May 2001) is an Uzbek professional footballer who plays for Pakhtakor and the Uzbekistan national team.

== Career ==
=== Club career ===
He made his debut in the Uzbekistan Super League for Kokand 1912 on 30 July 2019 in a game against Sogdiana.

On 8 July 2022, Erkinov signed a three-year contract with Russian Premier League club FC Torpedo Moscow. On 4 July 2023, Erkinov returned to Pakhtakor on a season-long loan.

On July 15, 2025, he returned to Pakhtakor.

=== International ===
He made his debut for main team, Uzbekistan on 3 September 2020 in a Friendly match against Tajikistan. On 23 September 2022, Erkinov scored his first goal in a friendly match against Cameroon.

== Career statistics ==
=== Club ===
As of match played 27 February 2025

Appearances and goals by club, season and competition
Club	Season	League			Cup		Continental		Other		Total	
Club	Season	Division	Apps	Goals	Apps	Goals	Apps	Goals	Apps	Goals	Apps	Goals
Kokand 1912	2019	USL	8	0	–		–		–		8	0
AGMK	2020	USL	10	1	–		–		–		10	1
Pakhtakor	2020	USL	8	0	4	0	1 (Note: Appearances in the AFC Champions League)	0	–		13	0
Pakhtakor	2021	USL	18	5	4	2	6	1	1 (Note: Appearances in the Uzbekistan Super Cup)	0	29	8
Pakhtakor	2022	USL	11	1	–		6	1	1	0	18	2
Pakhtakor	Total		37	6	8	2	13	2	2	0	60	10
Torpedo Moscow	2022–23	RPL	20	0	4	0	–		–		24	0
Pakhtakor (loan)	2023	USL	9	2	1	0	3	4	1	0	14	6
Al Wahda	2023–24	UAPL	9	1	3	0	–		0	0	12	1
Al Wahda	2024–25	UAPL	16	0	2	0	–		0	0	18	0
Career total			109	10	17	2	16	6	3	0	135	18

=== International ===
Uzbekistan national team
Year	Apps	Goals
2020	5	0
2021	4	0
2022	6	2
2023	5	1
2024	12	1
2025	10	3
Total	42	7

Statistics accurate as of match played 9 October 2025.

No.	Date	Venue	Opponent	Score	Result	Competition
1.	23 September 2022	Goyang Stadium, Goyang, South Korea	Cameroon	1–0	2–0	Friendly
2.	16 November 2022	Pakhtakor Stadium, Tashkent, Uzbekistan	Kazakhstan	1–0	2–0	Friendly
3.	17 June 2023	Milliy Stadium, Tashkent, Uzbekistan	Tajikistan	4–1	5–1	2023 CAFA Nations Cup
4.	26 March 2024	Milliy Stadium, Tashkent, Uzbekistan	Hong Kong	2–0	3–0	2026 FIFA World Cup qualification
5.	25 March 2025	Azadi Stadium, Tehran, Iran	Iran	1–0	2–2	2026 FIFA World Cup qualification
6.	30 August 2025	Olympic City Stadium, Tashkent, Uzbekistan	Oman	1–1	1–1	2025 CAFA Nations Cup
7.	9 October 2025	Olympic City Stadium, Tashkent, Uzbekistan	Kuwait	2–0	2–0	Friendly
