= 2025 CAFA Nations Cup =

International men's football competition

Tournament details
- Host countries: Tajikistan; Uzbekistan
- Dates: 29 August – 8 September
- Teams: 8 (from 3 sub-confederations)
- Venues: 3 (in 2 host cities)

Final positions
- Champions: Uzbekistan (1st title)
- Runners-up: Iran
- Third place: India
- Fourth place: Oman

Tournament statistics
- Matches played: 14
- Goals scored: 36 (2.57 per match)
- Attendance: 80,885 (5,778 per match)
- Top scorer(s): (Uzbekistan national football team) Igor Sergeev (3 goals)
- Best player: (Uzbekistan national football team) Khojiakbar Alijonov
- Best goalkeeper: (Iran national football team) Payam Niazmand
- Fair play award: Tajikistan

The 2025 CAFA Nations Cup was the second edition of the CAFA Nations Cup, the biennial international men's football championship of Central Asia organized by the Central Asian Football Association (CAFA). The event was held in Tajikistan and Uzbekistan from August 29 to September 8. Iran were the defending champions.

The final took place on 8 September at the Olympic City Stadium in Tashkent, between hosts Uzbekistan and Iran. Uzbekistan won the match 1–0 to claim their first CAFA Nations Cup title.

== Background ==
In April 2025, it was announced that the second edition of the CAFA Nations Cup would be held around September 2025, commemorating the ten-year anniversary of the CAFA organization.

In June 2025, it was confirmed the second edition would be co-hosted in Uzbekistan and Tajikistan on 29 August to 8 September 2025 for the six member associations along with Malaysia and Oman as the guest teams.

On 15 July 2025, Malaysia announced their withdrawal from the competition, citing reasons including problems with logistics and players' availability. On 30 July 2025, India was announced as the guest team, replacing Malaysia in Group B.

== Participating nations ==
Country	Appearance	Previous best performance	FIFA ranking (3 April 2025)
Afghanistan	2nd	Group stage (2023)	160
India (Note: India replaced Malaysia in Group B after the latter's withdrawal.) (invitee)	1st	—N/a	127
Iran	2nd	Winners (2023)	18
Kyrgyzstan	2nd	Fourth place (2023)	103
Oman (invitee)	2nd	Third place (2023)	77
Tajikistan (co-hosts)	2nd	Group stage (2023)	104
Turkmenistan	2nd	Group stage (2023)	142
Uzbekistan (co-hosts)	2nd	Runners-up (2023)	57

=== Seeding ===
The following eight teams were divided based on their FIFA Ranking of April 2025. Malaysia (131 ranked) was part of the 3 July draw but later withdrew on 15 July.

Pot 1	Pot 2	Pot 3	Pot 4
Iran (18); Uzbekistan (57) (co-hosts)	Kyrgyzstan (103); Tajikistan (104) (co-hosts)	Turkmenistan (142); Afghanistan (160)	Oman (77) (invitee); India (127) (invitee)

=== Draw results ===
The draw was held in Dushanbe on 3 July 2025 at 16:00 (UTC+5), and was broadcast live on YouTube. The draw resulted in the following groups with Malaysia included at the time of the draw, later being replaced by India:

Group A
Pos	Team
A1	Uzbekistan
A2	Kyrgyzstan
A3	Turkmenistan
A4	Oman

Group B
Pos	Team
B1	Tajikistan
B2	Iran
B3	Afghanistan
B4	India

== Venues ==
Tajikistan
Hisor		2025 CAFA Nations Cup (Tajikistan)
Hisor Central Stadium		2025 CAFA Nations Cup (Tajikistan)
Capacity: 20,000		2025 CAFA Nations Cup (Tajikistan)
Uzbekistan
Tashkent		2025 CAFA Nations Cup (Uzbekistan)
Olympic City Stadium	JAR Stadium	2025 CAFA Nations Cup (Uzbekistan)
Capacity: 12,000	Capacity: 8,500	2025 CAFA Nations Cup (Uzbekistan)

== Squads ==
Each team was required to register a preliminary squad of up to 35 players, three of whom had to be goalkeepers, from which the matchday squad could be selected on a match-by-match basis.

== Officials ==
The following officials were chosen for the competition.
(†): Also performed as both in some matches.

Referees

- Mooud Bonyadifard (†) (Iran)
- Hasan Akrami (†) (Iran)
- Vahid Kazemi (†) (Iran)
- Sanzhar Zhakypbekov (†) (Kyrgyzstan)
- Zayniddin Alimov (†) (Kyrgyzstan)
- Nurzatbek Abdıkadırov (†) (Kyrgyzstan)
- Abdullo Davlatov (†) (Tajikistan)
- Sajëçon Zajniddinov (Tajikistan)
- Sadullo Gulmurodi (†) (Tajikistan)
- Axrol Riskullayev (†) (Uzbekistan)
- Firdavs Norsafarov (†) (Uzbekistan)
- Ilgiz Tantashev (†) (Uzbekistan)

Assistant Referees, Fourth Officials & VAR Referees

- Alireza Ildorom (Iran)
- Farhad Moravveji (Iran)
- Ali Reza Moradi (Iran)
- Eldos Murzabekov (Kyrgyzstan)
- Kanat Mırsabekov (Kyrgyzstan)
- Nuraalı Abdunabiev (Kyrgyzstan)
- Ismoil Nuraliev (Tajikistan)
- Farhod Kuralov (Tajikistan)
- Amirçon Horkašev (Tajikistan)
- Vafo Karaev (Tajikistan)
- Hasan Karimov (Tajikistan)
- Andrey Sapenko (Uzbekistan)
- Alisher Usmanov (Uzbekistan)
- Bakhtiyorkhuja Shavkatov (Uzbekistan)

== Group stage ==
All times are local, Uzbekistan & Tajikistan Time (UTC+5).

Tiebreaker

Teams were ranked according to points (3 points for a win, 1 point for a draw, 0 points for a loss), and if tied on points, the following tie-breaking criteria were applied, in the order given, to determine the rankings.

1. Points in head-to-head matches among tied teams;
2. Goal difference in head-to-head matches among tied teams;
3. Goals scored in head-to-head matches among tied teams;
4. If more than two teams are tied, and after applying all head-to-head criteria above, a subset of teams are still tied, all head-to-head criteria above are reapplied exclusively to this subset of teams;
5. Goal difference in all group matches;
6. Goals scored in all group matches;
7. Penalty shoot-out if only two teams were tied and they met in the last round of the group;
8. Disciplinary points (yellow card = 1 point, red card as a result of two yellow cards = 3 points, direct red card = 3 points, yellow card followed by direct red card = 4 points);
9. Drawing of lots.

=== Group A ===
Pos	Team	Pld	W	D	L	GF	GA	GD	Pts	Qualification
1	Uzbekistan (H)	3	2	1	0	7	2	+5	7	Advance to final
2	Oman	3	2	1	0	5	3	+2	7	Advance to third place match
3	Turkmenistan	3	0	1	2	3	5	−2	1	
4	Kyrgyzstan	3	0	1	2	2	7	−5	1	

Source: Soccerway
Rules for classification: Tiebreakers
(H) Hosts
30 August 2025
17:00

Kyrgyzstan	1–1	Turkmenistan
Kojo 45'	Report	Jumaýew 44'

JAR Stadium, Tashkent
Attendance: 835
Referee: Sajëçon Zajniddinov (Tajikistan)
Man of the Match: Joel Kojo (Kyrgyzstan)
30 August 2025
19:30

Uzbekistan	1–1	Oman
Erkinov 55'	Report	Al-Rawahi 4'

Olympic City Stadium, Tashkent
Attendance: 3,491
Referee: Mooud Bonyadifard (Iran)
Man of the Match: Khojimat Erkinov (Uzbekistan)

2 September 2025
17:00

Oman	2–1	Kyrgyzstan
Al Sabhi 90+1', 90+5'	Report	Kozubayev 24'

JAR Stadium, Tashkent
Attendance: 803
Referee: Hasan Akrami (Iran)
Man of the Match: Issam Al Sabhi (Oman)
2 September 2025
19:30

Turkmenistan	1–2	Uzbekistan
Durdyýew 84' (pen.)	Report	Sergeev 37', 44' (pen.)

Olympic City Stadium, Tashkent
Attendance: 2,037
Referee: Abdullo Davlatov (Tajikistan)
Man of the Match: Igor Sergeev (Uzbekistan)

5 September 2025
17:00

Turkmenistan	1–2	Oman
Ballakow 51'	Report	Ahallyýew 12' (o.g.); Al Ghassani 90+3'

JAR Stadium, Tashkent
Attendance: 200
Referee: Vahid Kazemi (Iran)
Man of the Match: Muhsen Al Ghassani (Oman)
5 September 2025
19:30

Uzbekistan	4–0	Kyrgyzstan
Mozgovoy 20'; Shukurov 67' (pen.); Sergeev 82'; Turgunboev 90+3'	Report

Olympic City Stadium, Tashkent
Attendance: 3,842
Referee: Sadullo Gulmurodi (Tajikistan)
Man of the Match: Otabek Shukurov (Uzbekistan)

=== Group B ===
Pos	Team	Pld	W	D	L	GF	GA	GD	Pts	Qualification
1	Iran	3	2	1	0	8	3	+5	7	Advance to final
2	India	3	1	1	1	2	4	−2	4 (Note: Head-to-head points: India 3, Tajikistan 0.)	Advance to third place match
3	Tajikistan (H)	3	1	1	1	5	4	+1	4	
4	Afghanistan	3	0	1	2	1	5	−4	1	

Source: Soccerway
Rules for classification: Tiebreakers
(H) Hosts
Notes:
29 August 2025
17:00

Iran	3–1	Afghanistan
Aliyari 26', 64'; Hosseinzadeh 36'	Report	Musawi 21'

Hisor Central Stadium, Hisor
Attendance: 4,520
Referee: Sanzhar Zhakypbekov (Kyrgyzstan)
Man of the Match: Majid Aliyari (Iran)
29 August 2025
20:30

Tajikistan	1–2	India
Samiev 23'	Report	Ali 5'; Jhingan 13'

Hisor Central Stadium, Hisor
Attendance: 17,450
Referee: Firdavs Norsafarov (Uzbekistan)
Man of the Match: Sandesh Jhingan (India)

1 September 2025
17:00

India	0–3	Iran
	Report	Hosseinzadeh 59'; Alipour 89'; Taremi 90+6'

Hisor Central Stadium, Hisor
Attendance: 1,050
Referee: Ilgiz Tantashev (Uzbekistan)
Man of the Match: Amirhossein Hosseinzadeh (Iran)
1 September 2025
20:30

Afghanistan	0–2	Tajikistan
	Report	Panjshanbe 24' (pen.); Mabatshoyev 90+3'

Hisor Central Stadium, Hisor
Attendance: 15,265
Referee: Zayniddin Alimov (Kyrgyzstan)
Man of the Match: Ehson Panjshanbe (Tajikistan)

4 September 2025
17:00

Afghanistan	0–0	India
	Report

Hisor Central Stadium, Hisor
Attendance: 1,100
Referee: Nurzatbek Abdıkadırov (Kyrgyzstan)
Man of the Match: Anwar Ali (India)
4 September 2025
20:30

Tajikistan	2–2	Iran
Samiev 58'; Dzhuraboyev 77'	Report	Mehdi Mohebi 38'; Mohammad Mohebi 47'

Hisor Central Stadium, Hisor
Attendance: 18,200
Referee: Axrol Riskullayev (Uzbekistan)
Man of the Match: Zoir Dzhuraboyev (Tajikistan)

== Knockout round ==
=== Bracket ===
Final
8 September – Tashkent
Iran	0
Uzbekistan (a.e.t.)	1
Third place match
8 September – Hisor
India (p)	1 (3)
Oman	1 (2)

=== Third place match ===
8 September 2025
17:00

India	1–1 (a.e.t.)	Oman
Kumam 80'	Report	Al-Yahmadi 55'
Penalties
Chhangte (penalty scored); Bheke (penalty scored); Anwar (penalty missed); Jithin (penalty scored); Kumam (penalty missed)	3–2	(penalty missed) Al-Saadi; (penalty missed) Al-Kaabi; (penalty scored) Al-Rushaidi; (penalty scored) Al-Ghassani; (penalty missed) Al-Yahmadi

Hisor Central Stadium, Hisor
Attendance: 250
Referee: Firdavs Norsafarov (Uzbekistan)
Man of the Match: Gurpreet Singh Sandhu (India)

=== Final ===
8 September 2025
19:30

Uzbekistan	1–0 (a.e.t.)	Iran
Alijonov 120'	Report

Olympic City Stadium, Tashkent
Attendance: 11,842
Referee: Nurzatbek Abdıkadırov (Kyrgyzstan)
Man of the Match: Khojiakbar Alijonov (Uzbekistan)

== Goalscorers ==
There have been 36 goals scored in 14 matches, for an average of 2.57 goals per match.

3 goals

- (Uzbekistan national football team) Igor Sergeev

2 goals

- (Iran national football team) Majid Aliyari
- (Iran national football team) Amirhossein Hosseinzadeh
- (Oman national football team) Issam Al Sabhi
- (Tajikistan national football team) Shahrom Samiev

1 goal

- (Afghanistan national football team) Omid Musawi
- (India national football team) Anwar Ali
- (India national football team) Sandesh Jhingan
- (India national football team) Udanta Singh Kumam
- (Iran national football team) Ali Alipour
- (Iran national football team) Mohammad Mehdi Mohebi
- (Iran national football team) Mohammad Mohebi
- (Iran national football team) Mehdi Taremi
- (Kyrgyzstan national football team) Joel Kojo
- (Kyrgyzstan national football team) Tamirlan Kozubayev
- (Oman national football team) Jameel Al Yahmadi
- (Oman national football team) Muhsen Al Ghassani
- (Oman national football team) Nasser Al Rawahi
- (Tajikistan national football team) Zoir Dzhuraboyev
- (Tajikistan national football team) Shervoni Mabatshoyev
- (Tajikistan national football team) Ehson Panjshanbe
- (Turkmenistan national football team) Welmyrat Ballakow
- (Turkmenistan national football team) Didar Durdyýew
- (Turkmenistan national football team) Wepa Jumaýew
- (Uzbekistan national football team) Khojiakbar Alijonov
- (Uzbekistan national football team) Khojimat Erkinov
- (Uzbekistan national football team) Akmal Mozgovoy
- (Uzbekistan national football team) Otabek Shukurov
- (Uzbekistan national football team) Azizbek Turgunboev

1 own goal

- (Turkmenistan) Rüstem Ahallyýew (against Oman)

Source: GSA

== Awards ==
The following awards were presented at the end of the tournament:

Best Player

- (Uzbekistan national football team) Khojiakbar Alijonov

Top Goalscorer

- (Uzbekistan national football team) Igor Sergeev

Best Goalkeeper

- (Iran national football team) Payam Niazmand

Fair Play Award

- Tajikistan

== Broadcasting rights ==
Territory	Rights holder(s)
Uzbekistan	UZ NTRC Sport
Kyrgyzstan	Kyrgyz Sport TV
Tajikistan	TV Futbol
Iran	IRIB TV3
India	FanCode
International	The PRO Company; FIFA+ TV (final and third-place match only)

== Sponsors ==
- (Cyprus) 1xBet
- (Tajikistan) Evar
- (Tajikistan) Koinoti Nav
- (Tajikistan) Siyoma
- (Tajikistan) Tojiktelecom

== See also ==
- 2024 ASEAN Championship
- 2025 EAFF E-1 Football Championship
- 2026 SAFF Championship
- 2026 WAFF Championship
- 2027 AFC Asian Cup
