= Mehdi Taremi =

Iranian footballer (born 1992)

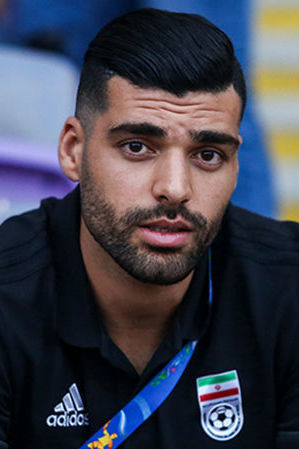
- Taremi with Iran in 2019

Personal information
- Full name: Mehdi Taremi
- Date of birth: 18 July 1992 (age 34)
- Place of birth: Bushehr, Iran
- Height: 1.87 m (6 ft 2 in)
- Position: Striker

Team information
- Current team: Al Wasl
- Number: 9

Youth career
- 2002–2006: Bargh Bushehr
- 2006–2010: Iranjavan

Senior career*
Years	Team	Apps	(Gls)
2010–2012	Shahin Bushehr	8	(1)
2012–2014	Iranjavan	22	(12)
2014–2018	Persepolis	87	(45)
2018–2019	Al-Gharafa	30	(13)
2019–2020	Rio Ave	30	(18)
2020–2024	Porto	122	(64)
2024–2025	Inter Milan	26	(1)
2025–2026	Olympiacos	24	(10)
2026–	Al Wasl	4	(2)

International career^{‡}
2011–2012	Iran U20	6	(0)
2013	Iran U23	1	(0)
2015–	Iran	111	(60)
Medal record
Men's football
Representing Iran
CAFA Nations Cup
Winner	2023 Kyrgyzstan–Uzbekistan	Team
Runner-up	2025 Tajikistan–Uzbekistan	Team
- * Club domestic league appearances and goals as of 23:17, 17 May 2026 (UTC) ‡ National team caps and goals as of 23:28, 29 September 2026 (UTC)

Mehdi Taremi (Note: Persian: مهدی طارمی, IPA: [mæhˈdiː tʰɒːɹeˈmiː]) (born 18 July 1992) is an Iranian professional footballer who plays as a striker for UAE Pro League club Al Wasl and the Iran national team.

He began his career at Shahin Bushehr and Iranjavan, and then played for Persepolis between 2014 and 2018; he was Persian Gulf Pro League top scorer on two occasions (2015–16 and 2016–17). Taremi made his first senior international appearance in 2015, and represented Iran at the FIFA World Cup in 2018, 2022 and 2026, and the AFC Asian Cup in 2019 and 2023.

== Early life and family ==
Mehdi Taremi was born on 18 July 1992 in Bushehr, Iran. He is the third and youngest child of his family. His father Alishah Taremi was an amateur footballer who played in local leagues. His older brother Mohammad is also a football player.

Prior to establishing himself as a professional footballer, Taremi served in the Islamic Revolutionary Guard Corps Navy, the maritime branch of the Islamic Revolutionary Guard Corps (IRGC), in Bushehr sometime between 2010 and 2012.

== Club career ==
=== Early career ===
Taremi started his career with Bargh Bushehr's Academy before moving on to Iranjavan's Youth Academy.

=== Shahin Bushehr ===
Taremi joined Shahin Bushehr in the summer of 2010. He played seven games and scored one goal in all competitions. In the winter of 2012, he was released by Shahin Bushehr to spend his conscription period in a military club, but he failed to join a club and was forced to spend his conscription period in a usual garrison.

=== Iranjavan ===
Taremi joined Iranjavan in the summer of 2013 and signed a two-year contract until the end of the 2014–15 season and was given the number 9. Taremi scored 12 times in 22 matches in 2013–14, and became the league's second top scorer after Mokhtar Jomehzadeh.

=== Persepolis ===
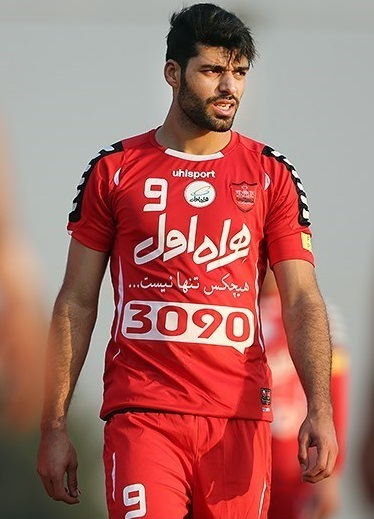
Taremi in Persepolis training in 2016

After becoming the Azadegan League's top scorer, Taremi had offers from many teams. He joined Persepolis in the summer of 2014 and signed a two-year contract through June 2016.

==== 2014–15 ====
Taremi made his debut in 1–1 draw with Naft Tehran, coming as a substitute for Reza Norouzi in 90th minute. He scored his first goal for the club on 15 August 2014 in a 1–0 victory over Zob Ahan. On 8 April 2015 Taremi scored a penalty in Persepolis 1–0 win in the Asian Champions League over Saudi Arabian club Al Nassr. He scored many goals for the club, and provided quality assists to win the Best Striker Award of the 14th Persian Gulf Pro League at the end of the 2014–15 season.

==== 2015–16 ====
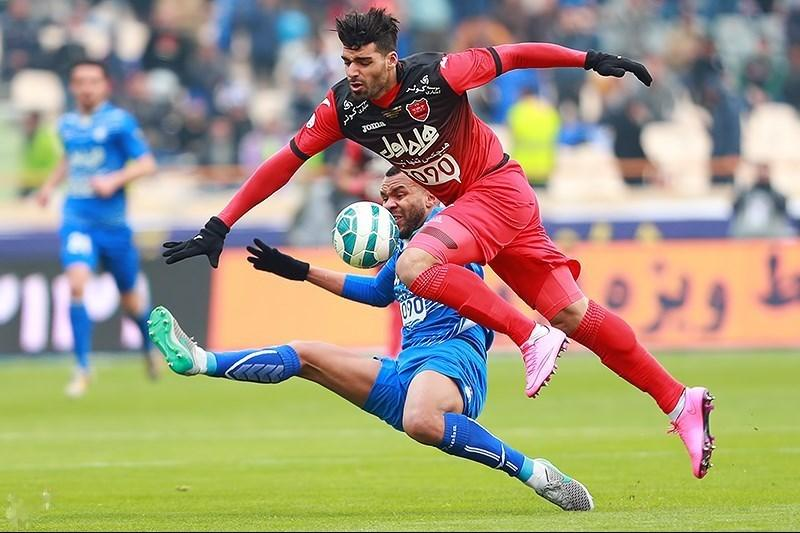
Taremi playing for Persepolis in Tehran derby.

Taremi missed the first week of the new season due to suspension, but in his first game back on 6 August 2015, he scored in a 2–1 loss to Esteghlal Khuzestan. Taremi scored twice in a 2–0 week five win against Foolad. This was Persepolis' first win of the season and lifted them out of the relegation spot. Taremi's good performances in the month of August earned him the Navad player of the month as voted by fans. On 18 December 2015, Taremi scored a brace against Rah Ahan in Persepolis' 2–0 victory. He ended the first half of the league as top scorer with nine goals in 12 games.

On 4 April 2016, Taremi scored a brace in a 3–2 victory against Siah Jamegan to keep Persepolis in third place. On 12 April 2016, Taremi was in talks to extend his contract to the end of the 2017–18 season. But eventually, he decided not to renew his contract. On 15 April 2016, Taremi scored a brace in Persepolis' historic 4–2 victory over Esteghlal in the Tehran derby. He became the league's top scorer with 16 goals at the end of the season; despite his good performances, his team failed to win the title at the last week.

==== 2016–17 ====
Before the start of the new season, Taremi announced that he would not extend his contract, to join to a European team. In July 2016, it was reported that Taremi was linked to Süper Lig team Çaykur Rizespor. The move was cancelled after Taremi returned to Iran and signed a two-year contract with Persepolis. He played his first match for Persepolis in 1–0 win over Saipa, replaced Omid Alishah in 77th minute. He also scored his first goal of the season in week 4 against Saba Qom. He scored a brace in 3–1 away win over Sepahan At the end of the season, the club celebrated its tenth Iran Pro League title, and Taremi became top scorer for a second consecutive season with 18 goals.

On 8 May 2017, Taremi scored a decisive hat trick against Emirati side Al Wahda in a 4–2 win to help his team qualify for the Round of 16 of the 2017 AFC Champions League. After his good performances, Taremi was linked with Dinamo Zagreb.

==== 2017–18 ====
Taremi played seven games, scoring on four occasions. During the 2017–18 season, Taremi was banned for four months because of a contract dispute with Turkish club Çaykur Rizespor dating back to June 2016, when the player reached an agreement to join the club and later returned to Persepolis. Persepolis were also banned from signing players for two transfer windows. FIFA ruled in favor of the Turkish club and imposed the ban.

=== Al Gharafa ===
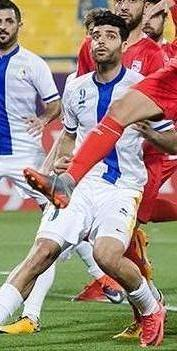
Taremi playing for Al-Gharafa in 2018

On 8 January 2018, Taremi signed an 18-month contract with the Qatari club Al-Gharafa. He scored his first goal in the first match of 2018 AFC Champions League against UAE's Al Jazira. Taremi first scored goal in Qatar League against Al Kharaitiyat on 16 February. On 19 February, he scored a brace against Iranian side Tractor Sazi on the second matchday of the AFC Champions League.

=== Rio Ave ===
On 23 July 2019, Taremi signed a two-year contract with Portuguese football club Rio Ave. Taremi scored a hat-trick in his first Primeira Liga start for the club on 23 August 2019 in a match against Aves. On 31 August, Taremi won his side three penalties in their match against Sporting CP, all on fouls committed by Sebastián Coates, as Rio Ave won 3–2.

Taremi finished his first season with 18 goals, joint top with Benfica pair Pizzi and Carlos Vinícius; the latter won the official Bola da Prata trophy for playing the fewest minutes of the three.

=== Porto ===
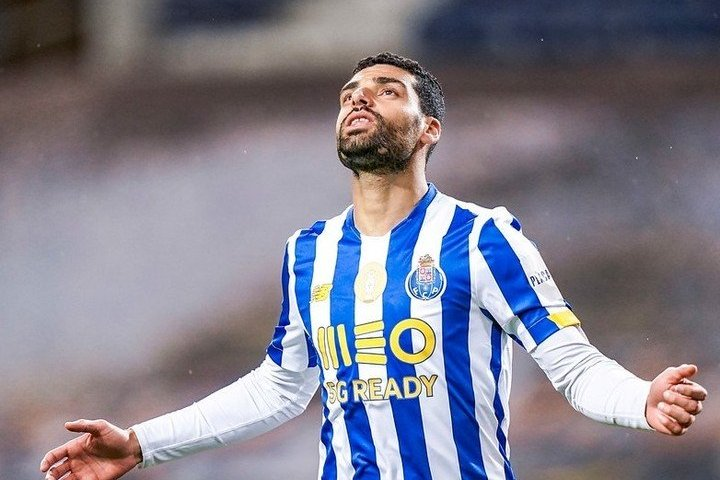
Taremi playing for Porto in 2021

In August 2020, Taremi signed a four-year contract with Primeira Liga club Porto. He scored his first league goal for Porto on 8 November 2020 in a 3–1 home win against Portimonense. There was a foul on Taremi during the 2020 Supertaça Cândido de Oliveira in December 2020 which gave Porto a penalty and resulted in their first goal of the match scored by Sérgio Oliveira. Porto went on to win the 42nd edition of the competition 2–0, which gave Mehdi Taremi his first European medal. On 17 February 2021, Taremi opened the scoring for Porto against Juventus in the round-of-16 first leg in the UEFA Champions League. He became the first Iranian to score in the first knockout phase of the competition. On 13 April, he scored the game-winning goal with a spectacular bicycle kick in a 1–0 away win over Chelsea in the Champions League quarter-finals, yet his club lost 1–2 on aggregate. After the final, his goal against Chelsea was voted as the best goal of the season's Champions League. The goal also won the "UEFA.com Goal of the Season" award, and was later nominated for the FIFA Puskás Award. Taremi finished the 2020–21 season with 16 goals and 11 assists. He won his first Primeira Liga title in the 2021–22 season with Porto. His contributions that season included 20 goals and 13 assists. He was the second-highest goalscorer and the third-highest assist provider that season. On 20 May 2023, he scored all four goals in a 4–2 away victory over Famalicão.

Taremi finished the 2022–23 season with 22 goals and seven assists in the league, earning the Bola de Prata, the top scorer award, and his second Taça de Portugal title with Porto. He was also named in the Primeira Liga Team of the Year, making it the fourth consecutive time.

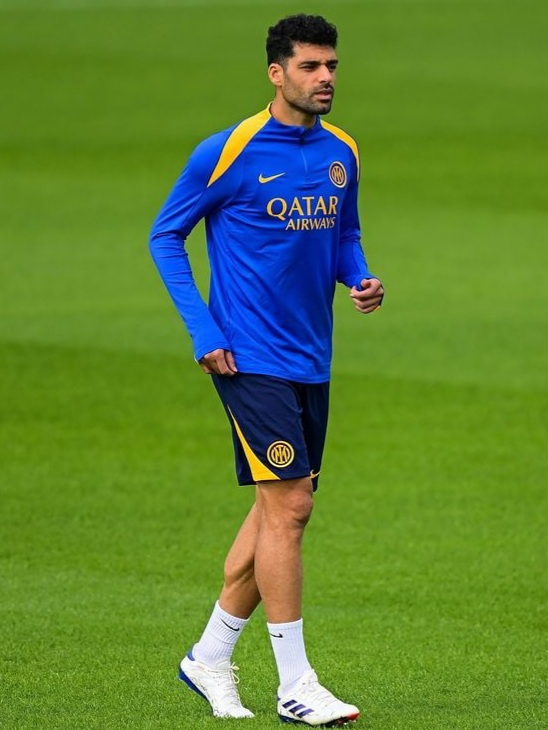
Taremi playing for Inter Milan in 2024

On 12 May 2024, he scored a 98th-minute goal in a 2–1 victory against Boavista, marking his final appearance for Porto at Estádio do Dragão. Later that month, on 26 May, he scored a penalty in extra time, securing a 2–1 victory over Sporting CP in the 2024 Taça de Portugal final.

=== Inter Milan ===
On 13 July 2024, Taremi signed a three-year contract with Italian champions Inter Milan, valid until 30 June 2027. Taremi thus became the first Iranian player as well as the second Asian player in Inter Milan's history, following Yūto Nagatomo. On 1 October, he scored his first goal and provided two assists in a 4–0 victory over Red Star Belgrade in the Champions League league phase. On 26 January 2025, he netted his first Serie A goal in a 4–0 away win over Lecce.

On 6 May 2025, Taremi provided the decisive assist to Davide Frattesi in the 99th minute of extra time, securing Inter Milan's dramatic victory over Barcelona in the second leg of the Champions League semi-final. With this contribution, he became the second Iranian player in history to reach the Champions League final, following legendary striker Ali Daei in 1999.

In July 2025, Botafogo presented a proposal for a two-and-a-half-year contract for Mehdi Taremi, then at Internazionale. Taremi refused the offer in order to negotiate with Premier League clubs.

=== Olympiacos ===
On 30 August 2025, it was revealed that Taremi would join Olympiacos for a fee of €2.5 million. A day later, he was announced by the team.

In his Super League debut against Panserraikos on 13 September, he scored a brace. In his Greek Cup debut against Asteras Tripolis, he also scored a brace.

=== Al Wasl ===
On 22 August 2026, Taremi joined UAE Pro League club Al Wasl for a fee of around $400K.

On the 28th of August 2026, he made his debut for the club in a 0–1 loss to Shabab-Al-Ahli at the Zabeel Stadium. On the 10th of September 2026, he scored his first goal for the club against Al Ain in the 53rd minute, in a 2–2 draw at the Hazza Bin Zayed stadium.

== International career ==
=== Youth ===
Taremi played for Iran student's national football team in Turkey tournament and scored 9 goals for the team. He was called up by Alireza Mansourian to participate in the team's training camp in Kish Island in 2013.

=== Senior ===
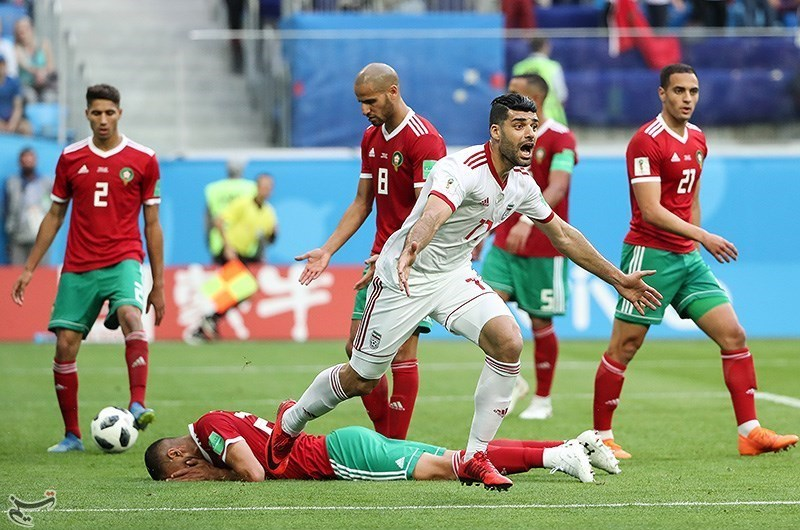
Taremi celebrating Iran's goal against Morocco in 2018 FIFA World Cup

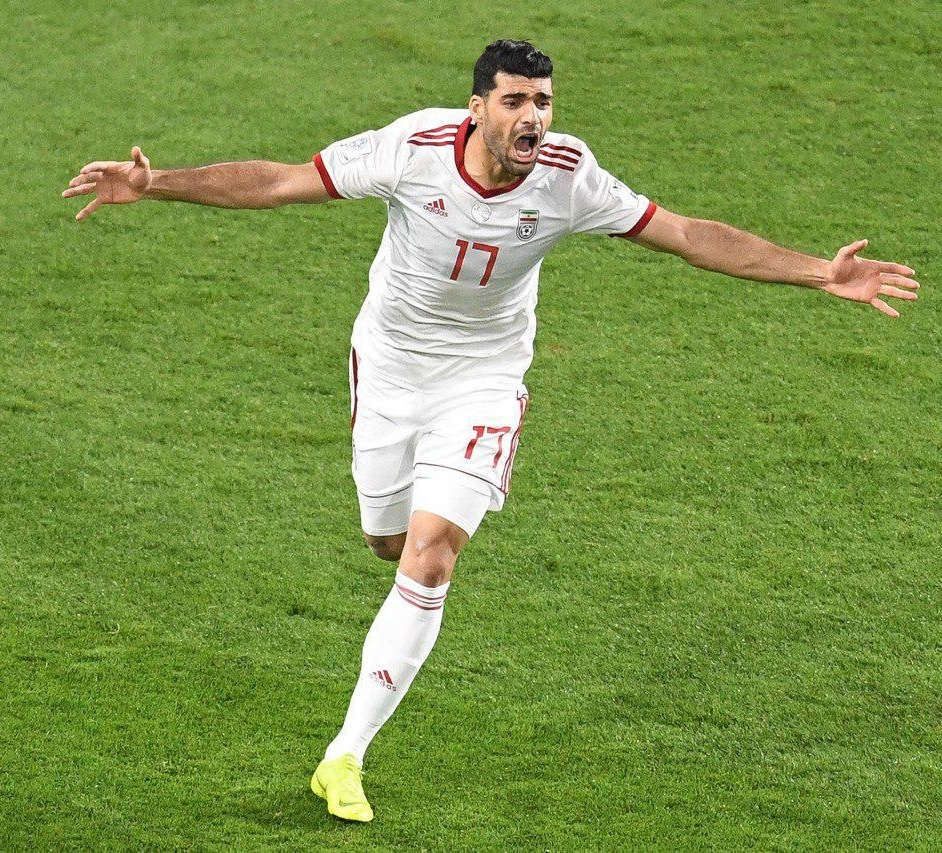
Taremi celebrating his goal against China in 2019 AFC Asian Cup

Taremi made his debut against Uzbekistan in a friendly match on 11 June 2015. He also came on as a second-half substitute in a World Cup Qualifying match against Turkmenistan on 16 June 2015.

On 3 September 2015, Taremi scored his first senior goals, a brace, in a 6–0 victory over Guam in a 2018 FIFA World Cup qualifier. On 23 March 2017, Taremi scored the winning and only goal in Iran's victory against Qatar in the final round of World Cup qualifying. He followed this up with another goal on 28 March 2017, in a 1–0 victory against China. On 12 June 2017, Taremi scored the second goal for Iran in a 2–0 win over Uzbekistan to seal the country's first consecutive qualification to two World Cups. In June 2018, he was named in Iran's final 23-man squad for the 2018 FIFA World Cup in Russia. With the score tied 1–1 in stoppage time in Iran's group stage match with Portugal, Taremi missed a point-blank shot wide left that would have eliminated Portugal and advanced Iran to the round of 16.

He was also named in Iran's final 26-man squad by Carlos Queiroz for the 2022 FIFA World Cup. In the first group stage game, he scored two goals as Iran lost 6–2 to England.

On March 25, 2025, Taremi scored twice against Uzbekistan in a 2–2 draw, a result that secured Iran's qualification for the 2026 FIFA World Cup, marking their seventh appearance in the tournament. Later that year, on 8 September, he made his 100th international appearance in a 1–0 defeat against Uzbekistan in the CAFA Nations Cup final. He was later named in the 26-man squad for the 2026 FIFA World Cup.

== Personal life ==
He was in a relationship with Iranian actress Sahar Ghoreishi for months in 2018. In March 2020, Taremi announced that he had started a new relationship and is preparing for marriage.

On 15 April 2022, Sporting CP, a rival of Taremi's then-club Porto, published an article on their club website and referred to Taremi as "a true snake charmer, someone from Persia always ready to go and perform circus tricks". The article was criticized by Porto fans and Iranians, including the Iranian Ambassador to Portugal, Morteza Damanpak. The club later deleted the article.

=== Political views ===
Taremi had been identified as a supporter of the government of the Islamic Republic of Iran. In June 2017, after President Hassan Rouhani congratulated the national team for qualifying for the 2018 World Cup, Taremi donated his shirt to Rouhani. On 8 December 2017, Taremi tweeted a message that called for the destruction of Israel accompanied by a portrait of Supreme Leader Ali Khamenei. Many Israelis urged FIFA to ban Taremi from the 2018 World Cup for violating FIFA's hate speech policy, with Israeli Foreign Ministry spokesperson Emmanuel Nachshon also condemning the tweet. Taremi subsequently deleted the tweet, although he did not apologize. In 2022, IranWire reported that Taremi had "a close relationship" with President Ebrahim Raisi. However, at the end of the same year, the player publicly criticized the repression of the civil protests prompted by the killing of Mahsa Amini; in the following years, he became more critical of the Iranian government's policies.

On 10 January 2026, Taremi refused to celebrate a goal he scored with Olympiacos during the Greek Super Cup, as a sign of protest towards the mass killing of protesters during the civil unrest in Iran. Later the same month, a fake post shared on Facebook and X claiming that Taremi had requested the club to return to Iran in order to fight in the armed conflict was erroneously reported on by various Italian and international media outlets; the claim was later dismissed both by the striker's agent, Federico Pastorello, and the president of Olympiacos, Kostas Karapapas.

== Career statistics ==
=== Club ===
As of match played 17 May 2026

Appearances and goals by club, season and competition
Club	Season	League			National cup (Note: Includes Iranian Hazfi Cup, Emir of Qatar Cup, Taça de Portugal, Coppa Italia, Greek Cup)		League cup (Note: Includes Taça da Liga)		Continental		Other		Total	
Club	Season	Division	Apps	Goals	Apps	Goals	Apps	Goals	Apps	Goals	Apps	Goals	Apps	Goals
Shahin	2010–11	Persian Gulf Pro League	6	1	0	0	—		—		—		6	1
Shahin	2011–12	Persian Gulf Pro League	2	0	0	0	—		—		—		2	0
Shahin	Total		8	1	0	0	—		—		—		8	1
Iranjavan	2012–13	Azadegan League	—		—		—		—		—		—	
Iranjavan	2013–14	Azadegan League	22	12	0	0	—		—		—		22	12
Iranjavan	Total		22	12	0	0	—		—		—		22	12
Persepolis	2014–15	Persian Gulf Pro League	26	7	4	0	—		8 (Note: Appearance(s) in AFC Champions League)	1	—		38	8
Persepolis	2015–16	Persian Gulf Pro League	25	16	2	2	—		—		—		27	18
Persepolis	2016–17	Persian Gulf Pro League	29	18	0	0	—		8	6	—		37	24
Persepolis	2017–18	Persian Gulf Pro League	7	4	0	0	—		2	1	1 (Note: Appearance in Iranian Super Cup)	0	10	5
Persepolis	Total		87	45	6	2	—		18	8	1	0	112	55
Al-Gharafa	2017–18	Qatar Stars League	8	5	2	0	—		7	5	1 (Note: Appearance in Qatar Cup)	1	18	11
Al-Gharafa	2018–19	Qatar Stars League	22	8	2	2	0	0	1	1	—		25	11
Al-Gharafa	Total		30	13	4	2	0	0	8	6	1	1	43	22
Rio Ave	2019–20	Primeira Liga	30	18	4	2	3	1	—		—		37	21
Porto	2020–21	Primeira Liga	34	16	6	5	1	0	6 (Note: Appearances in UEFA Champions League)	2	1 (Note: Appearance in Supertaça Cândido de Oliveira)	0	48	23
Porto	2021–22	Primeira Liga	32	20	6	3	1	1	9 (Note: Six appearances and one goal in UEFA Champions League, three appearances and one goal in UEFA Europa League)	2	0	0	48	26
Porto	2022–23	Primeira Liga	33	22	5	0	5	2	7	5	1	2	51	31
Porto	2023–24	Primeira Liga	23	6	2	2	2	1	7	2	1	0	35	11
Porto	Total		122	64	19	10	9	4	29	11	3	2	182	91
Inter Milan	2024–25	Serie A	26	1	3	0	—		12	1	2 (Note: Appearances in Supercoppa Italiana)	1	43	3
Olympiacos	2025–26	Super League Greece	24	10	4	3	—		10	2	1 (Note: Appearance in Greek Super Cup)	1	39	16
Al Wasl	2026–27	UAE Pro League	10	4	0	0	—		3	1	0	0	13	5
Career total			359	168	40	19	12	5	80	29	8	5	499	226

=== International ===
As of match played 29 September 2026

Appearances and goals by national team and year
National team	Year	Apps	Goals
Iran	2015	7	5
Iran	2016	9	2
Iran	2017	7	3
Iran	2018	12	3
Iran	2019	10	8
Iran	2020	1	1
Iran	2021	9	4
Iran	2022	9	5
Iran	2023	11	12
Iran	2024	17	9
Iran	2025	10	4
Iran	2026	9	4
Total		111	60

As of 24 September 2026
Scores and results list Iran's goal tally first, score column indicates score after each Taremi goal.

List of international goals scored by Mehdi Taremi
No.	Date	Venue	Opponent	Score	Result	Competition
1	3 September 2015	Azadi Stadium, Tehran, Iran	Guam	2–0	6–0	2018 FIFA World Cup qualification
2	3 September 2015	Azadi Stadium, Tehran, Iran	Guam	5–0	6–0	2018 FIFA World Cup qualification
3	8 September 2015	Sree Kanteerava Stadium, Bangalore, India	India	3–0	3–0	2018 FIFA World Cup qualification
4	17 November 2015	Guam National Football Stadium, Tamuning, Guam	Guam	1–0	6–0	2018 FIFA World Cup qualification
5	17 November 2015	Guam National Football Stadium, Tamuning, Guam	Guam	6–0	6–0	2018 FIFA World Cup qualification
6	7 June 2016	Azadi Stadium, Tehran, Iran	Kyrgyzstan	2–0	6–0	Friendly
7	10 November 2016	Shah Alam Stadium, Shah Alam, Malaysia	Papua New Guinea	2–0	8–1	Friendly
8	23 March 2017	Jassim Bin Hamad Stadium, Doha, Qatar	Qatar	1–0	1–0	2018 FIFA World Cup qualification
9	28 March 2017	Azadi Stadium, Tehran, Iran	China	1–0	1–0	2018 FIFA World Cup qualification
10	12 June 2017	Azadi Stadium, Tehran, Iran	Uzbekistan	2–0	2–0	2018 FIFA World Cup qualification
11	27 March 2018	UCP Arena, Graz, Austria	Algeria	2–0	2–1	Friendly
12	24 December 2018	Abdullah bin Khalifa Stadium, Doha, Qatar	Palestine	1–0	1–1	Friendly
13	31 December 2018	Khalifa International Stadium, Al Rayyan, Qatar	Qatar	1–0	2–1	Friendly
14	7 January 2019	Mohammed bin Zayed Stadium, Abu Dhabi, United Arab Emirates	Yemen	1–0	5–0	2019 AFC Asian Cup
15	7 January 2019	Mohammed bin Zayed Stadium, Abu Dhabi, United Arab Emirates	Yemen	3–0	5–0	2019 AFC Asian Cup
16	24 January 2019	Mohammed bin Zayed Stadium, Abu Dhabi, United Arab Emirates	China	1–0	3–0	2019 AFC Asian Cup
17	3 June 2019	Azadi Stadium, Tehran, Iran	Syria	2–0	5–0	Friendly
18	3 June 2019	Azadi Stadium, Tehran, Iran	Syria	3–0	5–0	Friendly
19	3 June 2019	Azadi Stadium, Tehran, Iran	Syria	4–0	5–0	Friendly
20	10 October 2019	Azadi Stadium, Tehran, Iran	Cambodia	4–0	14–0	2022 FIFA World Cup qualification
21	10 October 2019	Azadi Stadium, Tehran, Iran	Cambodia	9–0	14–0	2022 FIFA World Cup qualification
22	8 October 2020	Pakhtakor Central Stadium, Tashkent, Uzbekistan	Uzbekistan	2–0	2–1	Friendly
23	7 June 2021	Bahrain National Stadium, Riffa, Bahrain	Bahrain	3–0	3–0	2022 FIFA World Cup qualification
24	11 June 2021	Bahrain National Stadium, Riffa, Bahrain	Cambodia	3–0	10–0	2022 FIFA World Cup qualification
25	7 September 2021	Khalifa International Stadium, Al Rayyan, Qatar	Iraq	2–0	3–0	2022 FIFA World Cup qualification
26	7 October 2021	Zabeel Stadium, Dubai, United Arab Emirates	United Arab Emirates	1–0	1–0	2022 FIFA World Cup qualification
27	27 January 2022	Azadi Stadium, Tehran, Iran	Iraq	1–0	1–0	2022 FIFA World Cup qualification
28	1 February 2022	Azadi Stadium, Tehran, Iran	United Arab Emirates	1–0	1–0	2022 FIFA World Cup qualification
29	23 September 2022	NV Arena, Sankt Pölten, Austria	Uruguay	1–0	1–0	Friendly
30	21 November 2022	Khalifa International Stadium, Al Rayyan, Qatar	England	1–4	2–6	2022 FIFA World Cup
31	21 November 2022	Khalifa International Stadium, Al Rayyan, Qatar	England	2–6	2–6	2022 FIFA World Cup
32	23 March 2023	Azadi Stadium, Tehran, Iran	Russia	1–1	1–1	Friendly
33	13 June 2023	Dolen Omurzakov Stadium, Bishkek, Kyrgyzstan	Afghanistan	2–0	6–1	2023 CAFA Nations Cup
34	13 June 2023	Dolen Omurzakov Stadium, Bishkek, Kyrgyzstan	Afghanistan	3–0	6–1	2023 CAFA Nations Cup
35	13 June 2023	Dolen Omurzakov Stadium, Bishkek, Kyrgyzstan	Afghanistan	5–0	6–1	2023 CAFA Nations Cup
36	16 June 2023	Dolen Omurzakov Stadium, Bishkek, Kyrgyzstan	Kyrgyzstan	1–0	5–1	2023 CAFA Nations Cup
37	16 June 2023	Dolen Omurzakov Stadium, Bishkek, Kyrgyzstan	Kyrgyzstan	2–0	5–1	2023 CAFA Nations Cup
38	16 June 2023	Dolen Omurzakov Stadium, Bishkek, Kyrgyzstan	Kyrgyzstan	3–1	5–1	2023 CAFA Nations Cup
39	12 September 2023	Azadi Stadium, Tehran, Iran	Angola	1–0	4–0	Friendly
40	12 September 2023	Azadi Stadium, Tehran, Iran	Angola	2–0	4–0	Friendly
41	13 October 2023	Amman International Stadium, Amman, Jordan	Jordan	2–0	3–1	2023 Jordan International Tournament
42	16 November 2023	Azadi Stadium, Tehran, Iran	Hong Kong	3–0	4–0	2026 FIFA World Cup qualification
43	21 November 2023	Milliy Stadium, Tashkent, Uzbekistan	Uzbekistan	2–0	2–2	2026 FIFA World Cup qualification
44	5 January 2024	Olympic Stadium, Kish, Iran	Burkina Faso	1–1	2–1	Friendly
45	23 January 2024	Education City Stadium, Al Rayyan, Qatar	United Arab Emirates	1–0	2–1	2023 AFC Asian Cup
46	23 January 2024	Education City Stadium, Al Rayyan, Qatar	United Arab Emirates	2–0	2–1	2023 AFC Asian Cup
47	31 January 2024	Abdullah bin Khalifa Stadium, Doha, Qatar	Syria	1–0	1–1 (5–3 p)	2023 AFC Asian Cup
48	6 June 2024	Hong Kong Stadium, Hong Kong, China	Hong Kong	1–0	4–2	2026 FIFA World Cup qualification
49	6 June 2024	Hong Kong Stadium, Hong Kong, China	Hong Kong	2–1	4–2	2026 FIFA World Cup qualification
50	6 June 2024	Hong Kong Stadium, Hong Kong, China	Hong Kong	3–1	4–2	2026 FIFA World Cup qualification
51	5 September 2024	Fuladshahr Stadium, Fuladshahr, Iran	Kyrgyzstan	1–0	1–0	2026 FIFA World Cup qualification
52	19 November 2024	Dolen Omurzakov Stadium, Bishkek, Kyrgyzstan	Kyrgyzstan	1–0	3–2	2026 FIFA World Cup qualification
53	25 March 2025	Azadi Stadium, Tehran, Iran	Uzbekistan	1–1	2–2	2026 FIFA World Cup qualification
54	25 March 2025	Azadi Stadium, Tehran, Iran	Uzbekistan	2–2	2–2	2026 FIFA World Cup qualification
55	10 June 2025	Azadi Stadium, Tehran, Iran	North Korea	2–0	3–0	2026 FIFA World Cup qualification
56	1 September 2025	Hisor Central Stadium, Hisor, Tajikistan	India	3–0	3–0	2025 CAFA Nations Cup
57	27 March 2026	Mardan Sports Complex, Antalya, Turkey	Nigeria	1–2	1–2	2026 Jordan International Tournament
58	31 March 2026	Mardan Sports Complex, Antalya, Turkey	Costa Rica	2–0	5–0	2026 Jordan International Tournament
59	31 March 2026	Mardan Sports Complex, Antalya, Turkey	Costa Rica	4–0	5–0	2026 Jordan International Tournament
60	29 May 2026	Mardan Sports Complex, Antalya, Turkey	Gambia	3–1	3–1	Friendly

== Honours ==
Persepolis

- Persian Gulf Pro League: 2016–17, 2017–18
- Iranian Super Cup: 2017

Al-Gharafa

- Qatari Stars Cup: 2018–19

Porto

- Primeira Liga: 2021–22
- Taça de Portugal: 2021–22, 2022–23, 2023–24
- Taça da Liga: 2022–23
- Supertaça Cândido de Oliveira: 2020, 2022

Inter Milan

- UEFA Champions League runner-up: 2024–25

Olympiacos

- Greek Super Cup: 2025

Iran

- CAFA Nations Cup: 2023
- Jordan International Tournament: 2023

Individual

- Azadegan League top scorer (Group B): 2013–14
- Persian Gulf Pro League Striker of the Year: 2014–15, 2015–16, 2016–17
- Persian Gulf Pro League top scorer: 2015–16, 2016–17
- Iranian Footballer of the Year: 2016, 2017
- Primeira Liga top scorer: 2019–20, 2022–23
- Rio Ave Player of the Year: 2019–20
- SJPF Player of the Month: January 2021, September 2022, November 2022, December 2022
- Primeira Liga top assist provider: 2020–21
- UEFA Fans' Goal of the Tournament: 2020–21
- CAFA Nations Cup top scorer: 2023
- CAFA Nations Cup Best Player: 2023
- AFC Asian Cup Team of the Tournament: 2023
- Toopa Golden Ball: 2025
- The Athletic Top 100 World Cup Players: 51st (2025)

== See also ==
- List of men's footballers with 100 or more international caps
- List of men's footballers with 50 or more international goals

== Notes ==
1. Persian: مهدی طارمی, IPA: [mæhˈdiː tʰɒːɹeˈmiː]
