= Mohammad Mohebi =

Iranian footballer (born 1998)

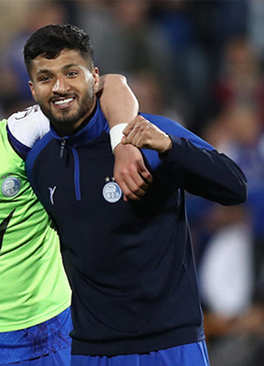
- Mohammad Mohebi with Esteghlal at 2023

Personal information
- Full name: Mohammad Ali Mohebi
- Date of birth: 20 December 1998 (age 27)
- Place of birth: Bushehr, Iran
- Height: 1.85 m (6 ft 1 in)
- Positions: Midfielder; forward

Team information
- Current team: Rijeka
- Number: 9

Youth career
- 2016–2017: Shahin Bushehr

Senior career*
Years	Team	Apps	(Gls)
2017–2019	Shahin Bushehr	36	(4)
2019–2021	Sepahan	53	(9)
2021–2023	Santa Clara	16	(3)
2022–2023	→ Esteghlal (loan)	28	(8)
2023–2026	Rostov	65	(13)
2026–	Rijeka	0	(0)

International career^{‡}
2019–	Iran	42	(15)
Medal record
Representing Iran
CAFA Nations Cup
Winner	2023 Kyrgyzstan – Uzbekistan	Team
Runner-up	2025 Tajikistan–Uzbekistan	Team
- * Club domestic league appearances and goals as of 17 May 2026 ‡ National team caps and goals as of 17 November 2026

Mohammad Mohebi (Persian: محمد محبی; born 20 December 1998) is an Iranian professional footballer who plays as a winger for Croatian Football League club Rijeka and the Iran national team.

== Club career ==
=== Sepahan ===
He made his debut for Sepahan in first fixtures of 2019–20 Iran Pro League against his former team, Shahin Bushehr, and scored first goal of match.

=== Santa Clara ===
On 24 August 2021, Mohebi joined Primeira Liga side Santa Clara on a three-year deal with Shahriyar Moghanlou moving in the opposite direction.

=== Rostov ===
On 13 July 2023, Mohebi signed with Russian Premier League club Rostov. He was voted league's player of the month for March 2024 after scoring 4 goals and providing 1 assist. On 17 August 2026, Rostov officially confirmed that Mohebi left Rostov as his contract expired.

=== Rijeka ===
On 1 September 2026, Mohebi signed a two-season contract with Rijeka in Croatia.

== International career ==
He made his debut against Cambodia in a 2022 FIFA World Cup qualification match on 10 October 2019, in which he scored two goals and had two assists on his debut. He scored against Japan at quarter-final of 2023 AFC Asian Cup.

On 1 June 2026, he was named in the 26-man squad for the 2026 FIFA World Cup.

== Career statistics ==
=== Club ===
As of match played 17 May 2026

Appearances and goals by club, season and competition
Club	Season	League			National cup		League cup		Continental		Other		Total	
Club	Season	Division	Apps	Goals	Apps	Goals	Apps	Goals	Apps	Goals	Apps	Goals	Apps	Goals
Shahin Busheshr	2017–18	League 2	25	3	—		—		—		—		25	3
Shahin Busheshr	2018–19	Azadegan League	24	2	1	0	—		—		—		25	2
Shahin Busheshr	Total		49	5	1	0	—		—		—		50	5
Sepahan	2019–20	Persian Gulf Pro League	26	6	3	1	—		6 (Note: Appearances in AFC Champions League)	1	—		35	8
Sepahan	2020–21	Persian Gulf Pro League	27	3	2	1	—		—		—		29	4
Sepahan	Total		53	9	5	2	0	0	6	1	0	0	64	12
Santa Clara	2021–22	Primeira Liga	16	3	0	0	2	0	—		—		18	3
Esteghlal (loan)	2022–23	Persian Gulf Pro League	28	8	5	2	—		—		1 (Note: Appearance in Iranian Super Cup)	0	34	10
Rostov	2023–24	Russian Premier League	22	6	7	0	—		—		—		29	6
Rostov	2024–25	Russian Premier League	15	4	5	2	—		—		—		20	6
Rostov	2025–26	Russian Premier League	28	3	3	0	—		—		—		31	3
Rostov	Total		65	13	15	2	—		—		—		80	15
Career total			211	38	26	6	2	0	6	1	1	0	246	45

=== International ===
As of match played 17 November 2026

Appearances and goals by national team and year
National team	Year	Apps	Goals
Iran	2019	3	2
Iran	2023	11	2
Iran	2024	13	6
Iran	2025	7	3
Iran	2026	8	2
Total		42	15

Scores and results list Iran's goal tally first.

List of international goals scored by Mohammad Mohebi
No.	Date	Venue	Opponent	Score	Result	Competition
1.	10 October 2019	Azadi Stadium, Tehran, Iran	Cambodia	11–0	14–0	2022 FIFA World Cup qualification
2.	10 October 2019	Azadi Stadium, Tehran, Iran	Cambodia	12–0	14–0	2022 FIFA World Cup qualification
3.	28 March 2023	Azadi Stadium, Tehran, Iran	Kenya	1–1	2–1	Friendly
4.	7 September 2023	Hristo Botev Stadium, Plovdiv, Bulgaria	Bulgaria	1–0	1–0	Friendly
5.	3 February 2024	Education City Stadium, Al Rayyan, Qatar	Japan	1–1	2–1	2023 AFC Asian Cup
6.	21 March 2024	Azadi Stadium, Tehran, Iran	Turkmenistan	4–0	5–0	2026 FIFA World Cup qualification
7.	15 October 2024	Rashid Stadium, Dubai, United Arab Emirates	Qatar	3–1	4–1	2026 FIFA World Cup qualification
8.	15 October 2024	Rashid Stadium, Dubai, United Arab Emirates	Qatar	4–1	4–1	2026 FIFA World Cup qualification
9.	14 November 2024	New Laos National Stadium, Vientiane, Laos	North Korea	2–0	3–2	2026 FIFA World Cup qualification
10.	14 November 2024	New Laos National Stadium, Vientiane, Laos	North Korea	3–0	3–2	2026 FIFA World Cup qualification
11.	20 March 2025	Azadi Stadium, Tehran, Iran	United Arab Emirates	2–0	2–0	2026 FIFA World Cup qualification
12.	4 September 2025	Hisor Central Stadium, Hisar, Tajikistan,	Tajikistan	2–0	2–2	2025 CAFA Nations Cup
13.	14 October 2025	Rashid Stadium, Dubai, United Arab Emirates,	Tanzania	2–0	2–0	Friendly
14.	31 March 2026	Corendon Airlines Park, Antalya, Turkey	Costa Rica	3–0	5–0	2026 Jordan International Tournament
15.	15 June 2026	SoFi Stadium, Los Angeles, United States	New Zealand	2–2	2–2	2026 FIFA World Cup

== Honours ==
Sepahan

- Iran Pro League runner-up: 2020–21

Esteghlal

- Iranian Super Cup: 2022

Iran

- CAFA Nations Cup: 2023

Individual

- Russian Premier League Player of the Month: March 2024
- Russian Football Union First-class Player: 2023–24
