= 2023 Jordan International Tournament =

Tournament details
- Host country: Jordan
- Dates: 13–17 October
- Teams: 4 (from 1 confederation)
- Venue: 1 (in 1 host city)

Final positions
- Champions: Iran
- Runners-up: Qatar
- Third place: Iraq
- Fourth place: Jordan

Tournament statistics
- Matches played: 4
- Goals scored: 12 (3 per match)
- Top scorer(s): (Jordan) Yazan Al-Naimat (3 goals)

The 2023 Jordan International Tournament was a football tournament for the national teams of Jordan, Iran, Qatar and Iraq, which took place during the October 2023 window of the FIFA International Match Calendar.

Iran won the tournament by defeating Qatar 4–0 in the final.

== Matches ==
Semi-finals
13 October – Amman
Jordan	1
Iran	3
13 October – Amman
Qatar	0 (6)
Iraq	0 (5)

Final
17 October – Amman
Iran	4
Qatar	0
Third place
17 October – Amman
Jordan	2 (3)
Iraq	2 (5)

=== Semi-finals ===
13 October 2023
18:00 UTC+3

Qatar	0–0	Iraq
Penalties
Al-Haydos (penalty scored); Fatehi (penalty missed); Alaaeldin (penalty missed); Suhail (penalty scored); Afif (penalty scored); Al-Brake (penalty scored); Gaber (penalty scored); Meshaal (penalty scored)	6–5	(penalty scored) Doski; (penalty missed) Al-Hamadi; (penalty missed) Ali; (penalty scored) Adnan; (penalty scored) Allée; (penalty scored) Al-Ammari; (penalty scored) Sulaka; (penalty missed) Resan

Amman International Stadium, Amman

13 October 2023
21:00 UTC+3

Jordan	1–3	Iran
Al-Naimat 74'		Azmoun 6'; Taremi 28'; Mohammadi 90+4'

Amman International Stadium, Amman

=== Third place match ===
17 October 2023
17:30 UTC+3

Jordan	2–2	Iraq
Al-Naimat 31', 79'		Hussein 70'; Al-Hamadi 75'
Penalties
Al-Mardi (penalty scored); Sadeh (penalty scored); Al-Rashdan (penalty scored); Haddad (penalty missed)	3–5	(penalty scored) Doski; (penalty scored) Al-Hamadi; (penalty scored) Adnan; (penalty scored) Hussein; (penalty scored) Attwan

Amman International Stadium, Amman

=== Final ===
17 October 2023
21:00 UTC+3

Iran	4–0	Qatar
Kanaanizadegan 69', 79'; Jahanbakhsh 73'; Azmoun 75'

Amman International Stadium, Amman

== Goalscorers ==
There were 12 goals scored in 4 matches, for an average of 3 goals per match.

3 goals

- (Jordan) Yazan Al-Naimat

2 goals

- (Iran) Sardar Azmoun
- (Iran) Hossein Kanaanizadegan

1 goal

- (Iran) Alireza Jahanbakhsh
- (Iran) Mehrdad Mohammadi
- (Iran) Mehdi Taremi
- (Iraq) Ali Al-Hamadi
- (Iraq) Aymen Hussein
