= Majid Aliyari =

Iranian footballer

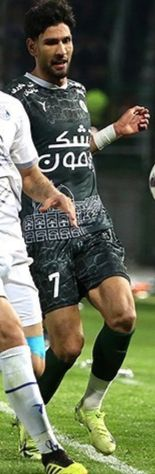
- Aliyari with Zob Ahan in 2025

Personal information
- Date of birth: 2 March 1996 (age 30)
- Place of birth: Tehran, Iran
- Height: 1.86 m (6 ft 1 in)
- Position: Forward

Team information
- Current team: Gol Gohar
- Number: 10

Youth career
- –2016: Moghavemat Tehran

Senior career*
Years	Team	Apps	(Gls)
2016–2017	Saba	7	(0)
2017–2019	Pars Jonoubi Jam	42	(5)
2019–2021	Saipa	36	(4)
2021–2022	Mes Rafsanjan	25	(5)
2022–2023	Foolad	9	(3)
2023–2025	Zob Ahan	49	(11)
2025–2026	Sepahan	13	(0)
2026–	Gol Gohar	10	(2)

International career^{‡}
2025–	Iran	2	(2)
Medal record
Representing Iran
CAFA Nations Cup
Runner-up	2025 Tajikistan–Uzbekistan	Team
- * Club domestic league appearances and goals as of 27 December 2025 ‡ National team caps and goals as of 1 September 2025

Majid Aliyari (Persian: مجید علیاری, born 2 March 1996) is an Iranian footballer who plays as a Forward for Iranian club Gol Gohar in the Persian Gulf Pro League.

== Club career ==
=== Saba Qom ===
He made his debut for Saba Qom in 13th fixtures of 2016–17 Iran Pro League against Sepahan while he substituted in for Karim Eslami.

== International career ==
He made his international debut against Afghanistan on 29 August 2025 in CAFA Championship where he scored two goals in their 3–1 win.

=== International ===
As of match played 01 September 2025

Appearances and goals by national team and year
National team	Year	Apps	Goals
Iran
Iran	2025	2	2
Total		2	2

Scores and results list Iran's goal tally first, score column indicates score after each Aliyari goal.

List of international goals scored by Majid Aliyari
No.	Date	Venue	Cap	Opponent	Score	Result	Competition
1	29 August 2025	Hisor Central Stadium, Hisar, Tajikistan	1	Afghanistan	1–1	3–1	2025 CAFA Nations Cup
2	29 August 2025	Hisor Central Stadium, Hisar, Tajikistan	1	Afghanistan	3–1	3–1	2025 CAFA Nations Cup
