= Amirhossein Hosseinzadeh =

Iranian footballer (born 2000)

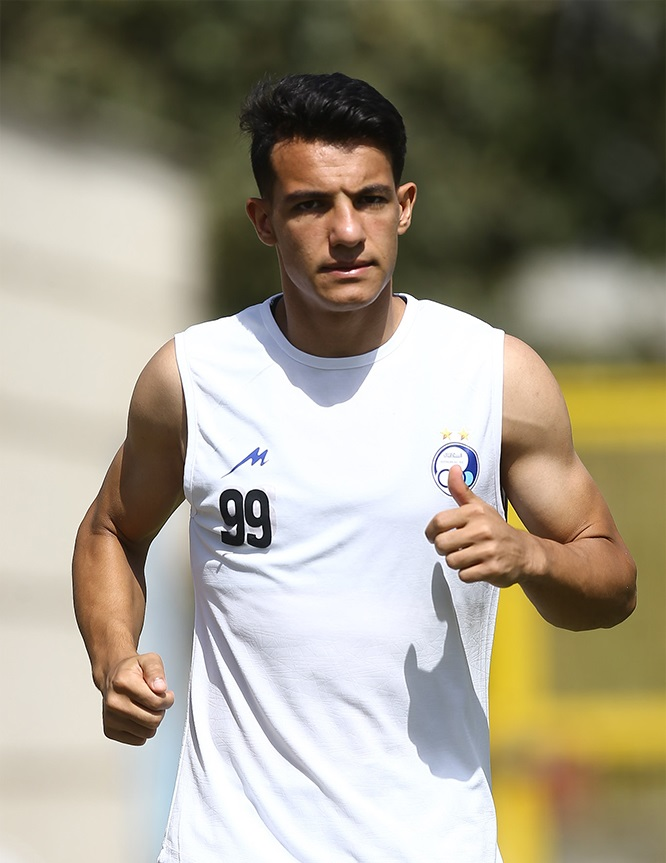
- Hosseinzadeh with Esteghlal in 2021

Personal information
- Full name: Amirhossein Hosseinzadeh Tazehgheshlagh
- Date of birth: 30 October 2000 (age 26)
- Place of birth: Tehran, Iran
- Height: 1.78 m (5 ft 10 in)
- Position: Winger

Team information
- Current team: Tractor
- Number: 99

Youth career
- 2015–2018: Moghavemat Tehran
- 2018–2019: Saipa

Senior career*
Years	Team	Apps	(Gls)
2019–2021	Saipa	47	(7)
2021–2022	Esteghlal	30	(8)
2022–2023	Charleroi	23	(2)
2023–	Tractor	89	(34)

International career^{‡}
2017	Iran U17	8	(0)
2018–2020	Iran U23	5	(1)
2022–	Iran	22	(5)
Medal record
Representing Iran
CAFA Nations Cup
Winner	2023 Kyrgyzstan – Uzbekistan	Team
Runner-up	2025 Tajikistan–Uzbekistan	Team
- * Club domestic league appearances and goals as of 26 February 2026 ‡ National team caps and goals as of 17 November 2026

Amirhossein Hosseinzadeh Tazehgheshlagh (Persian: امیرحسین حسین زاده تازه قشلاق; born 30 October 2000) is an Iranian footballer who plays as a winger for Persian Gulf Pro League club Tractor and the Iran national team.

== Career statistics ==
=== Club ===
As of 14 April 2026

Club	Season	League			Cup		Continental		Total	
Club	Season	League	Apps	Goals	Apps	Goals	Apps	Goals	Apps	Goals
Saipa	2018–19	Persian Gulf Pro League	14	4	0	0	0	0	14	4
Saipa	2019–20	Persian Gulf Pro League	21	3	1	1	0	0	22	4
Saipa	2020–21	Persian Gulf Pro League	12	0	0	0	0	0	12	0
Saipa	Total		47	7	1	1	0	0	48	8
Esteghlal	2020–21	Persian Gulf Pro League	0	0	0	0	1	0	1	0
Esteghlal	2021–22	Persian Gulf Pro League	30	8	2	0	0	0	32	8
Esteghlal	Total		30	8	2	0	1	0	33	8
Charleroi	2022–23	Belgian Pro League	23	2	0	0	0	0	23	2
Tractor	2023–24	Persian Gulf Pro League	28	3	3	0	1	0	32	3
Tractor	2024–25	Persian Gulf Pro League	28	14	1	0	8	8	37	22
Tractor	2025–26	Persian Gulf Pro League	22	10	1	0	9+1	2+1	33	13
Tractor	Total		78	27	5	0	18+1	10+1	102	38
Career Total			178	44	8	1	19+1	10+1	206	56

- + other

=== International ===
As of match played 17 November 2026

Appearances and goals by national team and year
National team	Year	Apps	Goals
Iran	2022	3	0
Iran	2024	1	0
Iran	2025	10	5
Iran	2026	8	0
Total		22	5

Scores and results list Iran's goal tally first, score column indicates score after each Hosseinzadeh goal.

List of international goals scored by Amirhossein Hosseinzadeh
No.	Date	Venue	Cap	Opponent	Score	Result	Competition
1	10 June 2025	Azadi Stadium, Tehran, Iran	7	North Korea	3–0	3–0	2026 FIFA World Cup qualification
2	29 August 2025	Hisor Central Stadium, Hisor, Tajikistan	8	Afghanistan	2–1	3–1	2025 CAFA Nations Cup
3	1 September 2025	Hisor Central Stadium, Hisor, Tajikistan	9	India	1–0	3–0	2025 CAFA Nations Cup
4	10 October 2025	Volgograd Arena, Volgograd, Russia	11	Russia	1–1	1–2	Friendly
5	14 October 2025	Rashid Stadium, Dubai, UAE	12	Tanzania	1–0	2–0	Friendly

== Club career ==
=== Saipa ===
He made his debut for Saipa in 17th fixtures of 2018–19 Iran Pro League against Paykan while he substituted in for Arash Rezavand.

=== Charleroi ===
On 22 August 2022, Hosseinzadeh signed a contract with Charleroi in Belgium for the term of two years, with two additional annual options.

Hosseinzadeh scored twice in the league in his first season in Belgium, and returned to Iran to play for Tractor FC in August 2023.

== International career ==
He made his debut on 24 March 2022 against South Korea. In his second game for Iran national football team, he played against the Lebanese team on 29 March 2022.

On 1 June 2026, he was named in the 26-man squad for the 2026 FIFA World Cup.

== Personal life ==
On 21 January 2026, while playing for Tractor against Mes Rafsanjan F.C., Hosseinzadeh was one of three goal scorers, along with teammates Danial Esmaeilifar and Domagoj Drožđek, who refused to celebrate their goals in solidarity with the 2025–2026 Iranian protests.

== Honours ==
Esteghlal

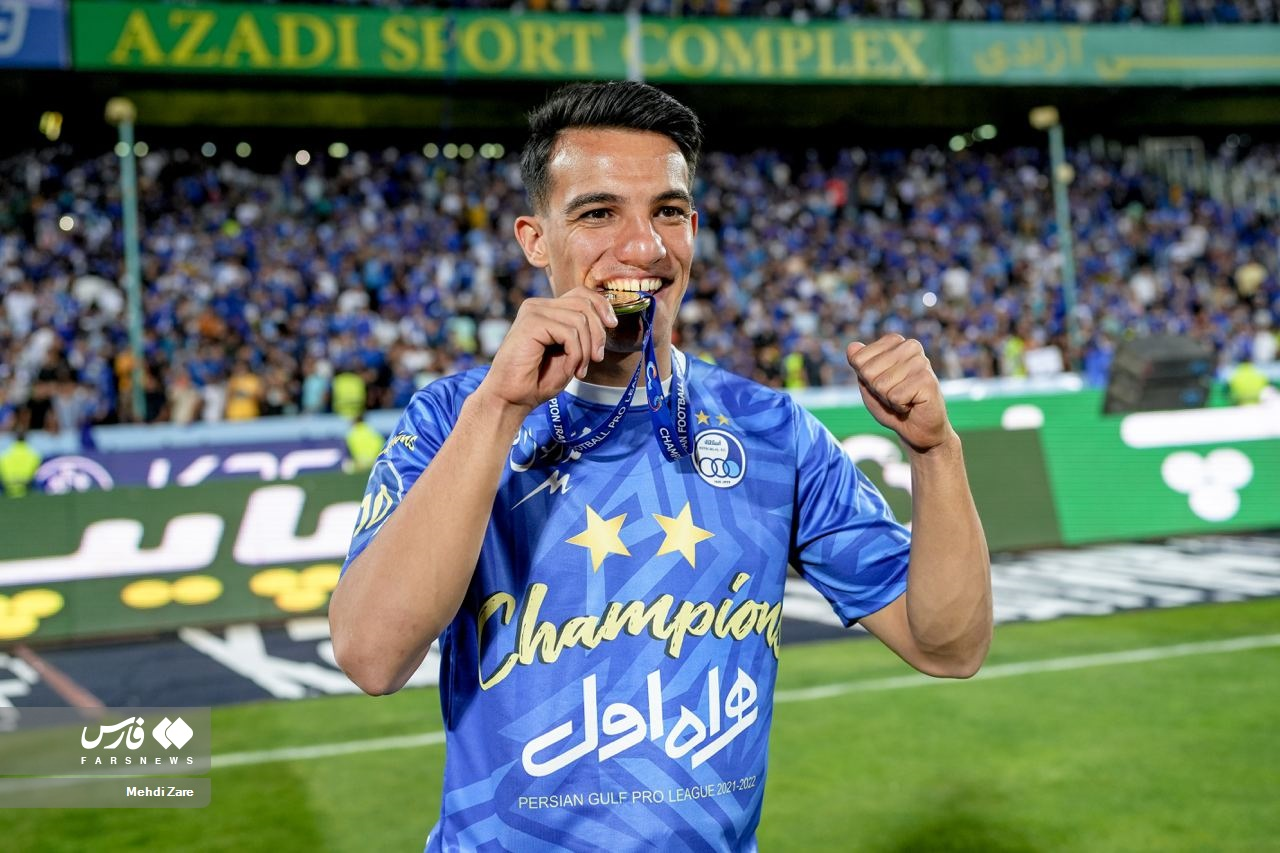
Hosseinzadeh with the 2021–22 Persian Gulf Pro League championship medal

- Persian Gulf Pro League: 2021–22

Tractor

- Persian Gulf Pro League: 2024–25
- Iranian Super Cup: 2025

Individual

- Persian Gulf Pro League top scorer: 2024–25, 2025–26
