= Omid Musawi =

Afghan footballer

Personal information
- Date of birth: 1 January 2001 (age 25)
- Place of birth: Kabul, Afghanistan
- Height: 1.83 m (6 ft 0 in)
- Position: Forward

Youth career
- 2006–2011: AGOVV
- 2011–2020: Twente
- 2020: Vitesse
- 2020–2022: PEC Zwolle

Senior career*
| Years | Team | Apps | (Gls) |
| 2022 | Para Hills Knights | 5 | (1) |
| 2023 | Achyronas-Onisilos | 7 | (0) |
| 2024 | Para Hills Knights | 17 | (4) |
| 2024–2026 | Selangor | 5 | (0) |
| 2026 | → Penang (loan) | 5 | (0) |

International career^{‡}
| 2022– | Afghanistan | 19 | (1) |
- * Club domestic league appearances and goals as of 4 May 2026 ‡ National team caps and goals as of 4 September 2025

Omid Musawi (Dari: امید موسوی; born 1 January 2001) is an Afghan professional footballer who last played as a forward for Malaysia Super League club Selangor and the Afghanistan national team.

== Club career ==
Musawi fled Afghanistan at age five and eventually settled in Apledoorn, the Netherlands. At age ten he was scouted by Twente and signed to their academy. In October 2019, Musawi contract was terminated and he left the club because of personality conflicts and a change of coaching staff. During his time at the club, he was ultimately promoted to the reserve team, for which he made three appearances. He also tallied ten goals and three assists in thirty-one appearances for the under-19 side. Following his long stint with Twente, he had spells with SBV Vitesse and PEC Zwolle.

=== Para Hills Knights ===
In July 2022, Musawi eventually signed with one of several interested clubs in Australia, Para Hills Knights marking his first professional career contract. Para Hills advanced to the State League 1 South Australia Grand Final that season. Despite a goal by Musawi, the club ultimately fell to West Adelaide 3–4 and missed out on promotion to the National Premier Leagues South Australia. During the 2022 season he made five league appearances, scoring one goal. He made an additional four appearances and scored another goal in the playoffs. Following the season, Musawi returned to the Netherlands to train with Dordrecht.

=== Achyronas-Onisilos ===
On 20 January 2023, Musawi signed with Cypriot Second Division club Achyronas-Onisilos. He make his debut in a 2–0 lost to Othellos Athienou on 11 February.

=== Return to Para Hills Knights ===
In January 2024, Masawi resigned with his former club Para Hills Knights.

=== Selangor ===
On 4 October 2024, Masawi signed with Malaysian Super League club Selangor, and debuted that evening for the reserve squad against Negeri Sembilan.

== International career ==
Musawi made his senior international debut on 1 June 2022 in a friendly against Vietnam. A week later, he made his competitive debut in a 2023 AFC Asian Cup qualification match against Hong Kong.

== Career statistics ==
=== Club ===
As of 8 March 2024

Appearances and goals by club, season and competition
| Club | Season | League | | | Cup | | Total | |
| Club | Season | Division | Apps | Goals | Apps | Goals | Apps | Goals |
|---|---|---|---|---|---|---|---|---|
| Para Hills Knights | 2022 | SL1 SA | 9 | 2 | — | | 9 | 2 |
| Achyronas-Onisilos | 2023 | Cypriot Div 2 | 7 | 0 | — | | 7 | 0 |
| Para Hills Knights | 2024 | NPL SA | 10 | 4 | — | | 10 | 4 |
| Career total | | | 26 | 6 | 0 | 0 | 26 | 6 |

=== International ===
As of 30 August 2025

Afghanistan national team
| Year | Apps | Goals |
|---|---|---|
| 2022 | 4 | 0 |
| 2023 | 4 | 0 |
| 2024 | 1 | 0 |
| 2025 | 2 | 1 |
| Total | 11 | 1 |

Scores and results list Afghanistan's goal tally first, score column indicates score after each Musawi goal.

List of international goals scored by Omid Musawi
| No. | Date | Venue | Opponent | Score | Result | Competition |
|---|---|---|---|---|---|---|
| 1 | 29 August 2025 | Hisor Central Stadium, Hisor, Tajikistan | Iran | 1–0 | 1–3 | 2025 CAFA Nations Cup |

== Honours ==
Penang

- MFL Challenge Cup runner-up: 2026
