= Jordan International Tournament =

- Organiser(s): Jordan Football Association
- Founded: 1992; 34 years ago
- Teams: 4
- Current champions: Nigeria (1st title)
- Most championships: Jordan (2 titles)
- 2026 Jordan International Tournament

The Jordan International Tournament is an international association football competition that has been held in Jordan since 1992; it is organised by the Jordan Football Association (JFA).

Nigeria are the defending champions after drawing 2–2 with Jordan.

== Results ==
Ed.	Year	Host	First place game			Third place game			Teams
Ed.	Year	Host	Champions	Score	Runners-up	Third place	Score	Fourth place	Teams
1	1992	Jordan	Jordan	2–0	Iraq	Moldova	3–1	Congo	8
2	2022	Jordan	Jordan	1–0	Oman	Iraq	1–0	Syria	4
3	2023	Jordan	Iran	4–0	Qatar	Iraq	2–2 (5–3 p)	Jordan	4
4	2026	Turkey (Note: The 2026 edition between Jordan, Iran, Nigeria, and Costa Rica were moved from Amman, Jordan to Antalya, Turkey due to the travel restrictions from the 2026 Iran war.)	Nigeria	No playoffs	Iran	Jordan	No playoffs	Costa Rica	4

== Participating nations ==
Legend

- 1st – Champions
- 2nd – Runners-up
- 3rd – Third place
- 4th – Fourth place
- SF – Semi-finals
- GS – Group stage
- Q – Qualified for upcoming tournament
- × – Did not enter / Withdrew / Disqualified
- – Hosts

For each tournament, the number of teams in each finals tournament (in brackets) are shown.

Team	1992 (8)	2022 (4)	2023 (4)	2026 (4)	Apps.
Congo	4th	×	×	×	1
Costa Rica	×	×	×	4th	1
(Algeria) ES Sétif	GS	×	×	×	1
Ethiopia	GS	×	×	×	1
Iran	×	×	1st	2nd	4
Iraq	2nd	3rd	3rd	×	3
Jordan	1st	1st	4th	3rd	3
Moldova	3rd	×	×	×	1
Nigeria	×	×	×	1st	1
Oman	×	2nd	×	×	1
Qatar	×	×	2nd	×	1
Pakistan	GS	×	×	×	1
Sudan	GS	×	×	×	1
Syria	×	4th	×	×	1
