= Olympic City Stadium =

Stadium in Tashkent, Uzbekistan

Olympic Stadium
- Olimpiya stadioni
- Aerial view of the Olympic Stadium
- Interactive map of Olympic Stadium
- Location: Tashkent, Uzbekistan
- Coordinates: 41.3224°N 69.4276°E
- Capacity: 12,000
- Scoreboard: Yes
- Record attendance: 11,482 ( Uzbekistan vs. Iran, 8 September 2025)

Construction
- Groundbreaking: 2022
- Built: 2022–2025
- Opened: 18 August 2025
- Main contractor: CAMC Engineering

Tenants
- Uzbekistan (2025); 2025 CAFA Nations Cup (2025); PFK Navbahor (2026–); OKMK FK (2026–); Bunyodkor (2026–)

The Olympic Stadium (Uzbek: Olimpiya Shaharchasi stadioni) is a football stadium located in the eastern part of Tashkent, Uzbekistan, within the Tashkent Olympic Village complex on New Uzbekistan Street.

== History ==
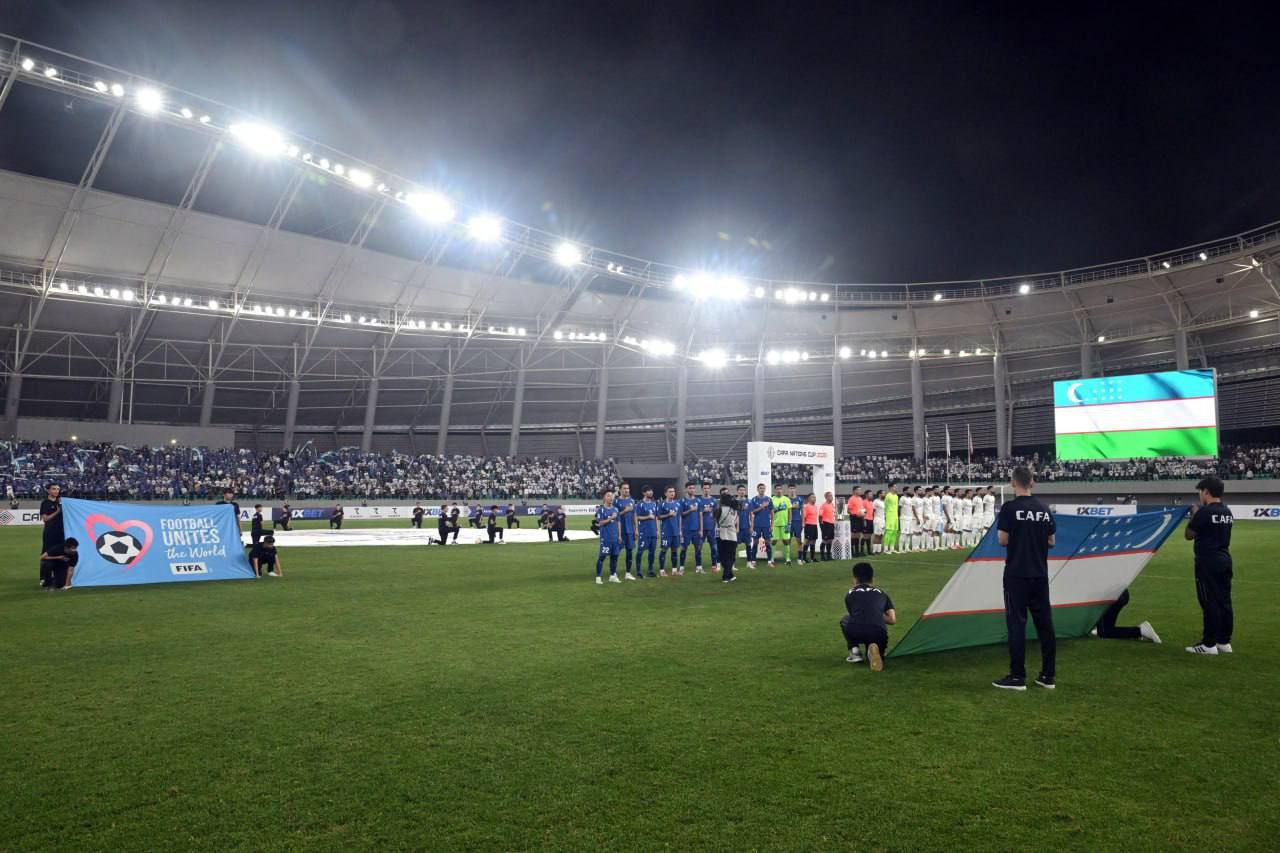
Inside Olympic City Stadium

Construction of the stadium began on 9 November 2022 and was completed on 18 August 2025 by the Chinese construction company CAMC Engineering.

The venue debuted in August 2025 by hosting matches at the 2025 CAFA Nations Cup.

== Facility ==
The stadium, with a capacity of 12,000 seats, is designed to host competitions in 48 athletics events. The stadium also features a nine-lane athletics track surrounding the pitch.

The stands are divided into four sections, with the western main stand being larger and featuring two tiers and VIP seats. The seats are painted in the colors of the Uzbekistan flag. The stadium's stands are completely covered.

== Hostings ==
Starting from the 2026 season of the Uzbekistan Super League, the stadium host home matches of the AGMK, Navbahor clubs, and some matches of FC Bunyodkor.

In 2027, the park will host the IBSA World Games (Wednesday 26 May 2027 to Sunday 6 June 2027), then the World Para Athletics Championships (from Wednesday 19 June 2026).

== Major tournament matches ==
=== CAFA Nations Cup ===
Date	Team #1	Result	Team #2	Round	Attendance	Edition
30 August 2025	Uzbekistan	1–1	Oman	Group stage	3491	2025 CAFA Nations Cup
2 September 2025	Turkmenistan	1–2	Uzbekistan	Group stage	2,037	2025 CAFA Nations Cup
5 September 2025	Uzbekistan	4–0	Kyrgyzstan	Group stage	3842	2025 CAFA Nations Cup
8 September 2025	Uzbekistan	1–0	Iran	Final	11,482	2025 CAFA Nations Cup

== See also ==
- List of football stadiums in Uzbekistan

== Links ==
- Media related to Olympic Stadium (Tashkent) at Wikimedia Commons
- Olympic City Stadium at StadiumDB.com
