= List of Uzbek football transfers 2012 =

This is a list of 2012 Uzbekistan PFL and 2012 First League transfers in the year 2012 by club. Only transfers of the Uzbek League and First League are provided. Start of the season was March 2012.

== Winter 2012 transfers ==
=== FK Andijan ===
In: Note: Flags indicate national team as defined under FIFA eligibility rules; some limited exceptions apply. Players may hold more than one non-FIFA nationality.

| No. | Pos. | Nation | Player |
|---|---|---|---|
| — | GK | BLR | Aleksandr Petukhov |
| — | DF | LTU | Tadas Gražiūnas (from (Uzbekistan) FK Buxoro) |
| — | DF | UZB | Aziz Juraev (from (Uzbekistan) FC Shurtan Guzar) |
| — | DF | UZB | Azamat Isaev (from (Uzbekistan) Xorazm FK Urganch) |
| — | DF | UZB | Maqsud Hayitov (from (Uzbekistan) Nasaf Qarshi) |
| — | DF | UZB | Aziz Ghulomkhojaev (from (Uzbekistan) FC Bunyodkor) |
| — | DF | UZB | Аdkhаm Nоrmukhаmmedоv (from (Uzbekistan) Nasaf Qarshi) |
| — | MF | UZB | Akram Bakhridtinov (from (Uzbekistan) FC Pakhtakor) |
| — | MF | UZB | Anvar Rakhimov (from (Uzbekistan) FC Bunyodkor) |
| — | MF | UZB | Jakhongir Qurbonov (from (Uzbekistan) Atlaschi-Marg'ilon) |
| — | MF | RUS | Vladimir Shishelov (from (Russia) FC Fakel Voronezh) |
| — | MF | UZB | Sanjar Turakulov (from (Uzbekistan) Sogdiana Jizzakh) |
| — | FW | TJK | Farkhod Tokhirov (from (Tajikistan) Esteghlal Dushanbe) |
| — | FW | UZB | Akmal Ergashev (from (Uzbekistan) FC Spartak Tashkent) |

Out: Note: Flags indicate national team as defined under FIFA eligibility rules; some limited exceptions apply. Players may hold more than one non-FIFA nationality.

| No. | Pos. | Nation | Player |
|---|---|---|---|
| 1 | GK | UZB | Gayratjon Hasanov (to (Uzbekistan) Nasaf Qarshi) |
| 12 | GK | UZB | Igor Mikhailov (to (Uzbekistan) FK Samarqand-Dinamo) |
| 8 | FW | UZB | Oybek Kilichev (to (Uzbekistan) FC Pakhtakor) |

=== FK Buxoro ===
In:

Note: Flags indicate national team as defined under FIFA eligibility rules; some limited exceptions apply. Players may hold more than one non-FIFA nationality.

| No. | Pos. | Nation | Player |
|---|---|---|---|
| — | GK | UZB | Yuriy Tsoy (from (Uzbekistan) Neftchi Farg'ona) |
| — | DF | UKR | Oleksandr Tarasenko (from (Ukraine) MFC Mykolaiv) |
| — | DF | UZB | Asqar Mukhiddinov (from (Uzbekistan) Neftchi Farg'ona) |
| — | DF | UZB | Akmal Rustamov (from (Uzbekistan) Qizilqum Zarafshon) |
| — | DF | UZB | Doniyor Usmanov (from (Uzbekistan) Dynamo Samarkand) |
| — | DF | UZB | Bakhriddin Amonov (from (Uzbekistan) Navbahor Namangan) |
| — | MF | TKM | Amir Gurbani (from (Turkmenistan) FC Altyn Asyr) |
| — | FW | GEO | Mikheil Kakaladze (from (Georgia (country)) FK Kobuleti) |
| — | FW | UZB | Alisher Kholiqov (from (Uzbekistan) Neftchi Farg'ona) |
| — | FW | UZB | Vakhid Shodiev (from (Uzbekistan) Neftchi Farg'ona) |

Out: Note: Flags indicate national team as defined under FIFA eligibility rules; some limited exceptions apply. Players may hold more than one non-FIFA nationality.

| No. | Pos. | Nation | Player |
|---|---|---|---|
| 12 | GK | LTU | Pavelas Leusas |
| 18 | DF | LTU | Tadas Gražiūnas (to (Uzbekistan) FK Andijan) |
| — | FW | LTU | Artūras Fomenka (to (Uzbekistan) Navbahor Namangan) |
| — | MF | RUS | Artem Nikitenko (to (Uzbekistan) Olmaliq FK) |
| — | MF | UKR | Rоmаn Rоmаnchuk |
| 7 | MF | UZB | Sukhrob Ne'matov (to (Uzbekistan) Nasaf Qarshi) |

=== FC Bunyodkor ===
In: Note: Flags indicate national team as defined under FIFA eligibility rules; some limited exceptions apply. Players may hold more than one non-FIFA nationality.

| No. | Pos. | Nation | Player |
|---|---|---|---|
| 25 | GK | UZB | Nodir Ibrakhimov (from (Uzbekistan) FK Yangiyer) |
| 11 | DF | KAZ | Emil Kenzhesariev (Transferred from (Kazakhstan) FC Aktobe) |
| 16 | DF | UZB | Artyom Filiposyan (Transferred from (Uzbekistan) Nasaf Qarshi) |
| 29 | DF | UZB | Abduqakhor Khojiakbarov (from (Uzbekistan) Olmaliq FK) |
| 7 | MF | AUS | David Carney (Transferred from (Spain) AD Alcorcón) |
| 33 | MF | SVK | Ján Kozák (Transferred from (Greece) AEL) |
| 13 | MF | UZB | Lutfulla Turaev (Transferred from (Uzbekistan) Nasaf Qarshi) |
| — | MF | UZB | Sardor Sabirkhodjaev (Transferred from (Uzbekistan) FC Pakhtakor) |
| 29 | FW | UZB | Bahodir Pardaev (end of loan to (Uzbekistan) Sogdiana Jizzakh) |

Out: Note: Flags indicate national team as defined under FIFA eligibility rules; some limited exceptions apply. Players may hold more than one non-FIFA nationality.

| No. | Pos. | Nation | Player |
|---|---|---|---|
| 3 | DF | SRB | Saša Đorđević |
| — | MF | SRB | Uroš Milosavljević |
| 14 | FW | SRB | Miloš Trifunović (end of loan from (Serbia) Red Star Belgrade) |
| — | DF | UZB | Aziz Ghulomkhojaev (to (Uzbekistan) FK Andijan) |
| 5 | DF | UZB | Islom Inomov (to (Uzbekistan) Lokomotiv Tashkent) |
| 47 | MF | UZB | Asqar Jadigerov (to (Thailand) Buriram United) |
| — | DF | UZB | Orifjon Mamajonov (to (Uzbekistan) Olmaliq FK) |
| — | MF | UZB | Anvar Rakhimov (on loan to (Uzbekistan) FK Andijan) |

=== Lokomotiv Tashkent ===
In: Note: Flags indicate national team as defined under FIFA eligibility rules; some limited exceptions apply. Players may hold more than one non-FIFA nationality.

| No. | Pos. | Nation | Player |
|---|---|---|---|
| 3 | DF | UZB | Islom Inomov (from (Uzbekistan) FC Bunyodkor) |
| 20 | DF | UZB | Islom Tukhtakhodjaev (from (Uzbekistan) Neftchi Farg'ona) |
| 8 | MF | TKM | Maksim Kazankov (from (Russia) FC Sokol Saratov) |
| 14 | MF | ARM | Romik Khachatryan (from (Cyprus) Omonia Aradippou) |
| 15 | MF | FRA | Mahamat-Bindi Moustapha (from (Chad) Dynamic N`Djamena) |
| 10 | MF | ARM | Zhora Oganesian |
| 17 | MF | UZB | Ibrokhim Rakhimov |
| 11 | FW | UZB | Aleksandr Shadrin (from (Uzbekistan) Navbahor Namangan) |
| — | MF | UZB | Dilshod Rakhmatullaev (from (Uzbekistan) Olmaliq FK) |

Out: Note: Flags indicate national team as defined under FIFA eligibility rules; some limited exceptions apply. Players may hold more than one non-FIFA nationality.

| No. | Pos. | Nation | Player |
|---|---|---|---|
| — | FW | NGA | Alex Ojiaka |
| — | FW | UKR | Arsen Manasyan (to (Ukraine) FC Enerhiya Nova Kakhovka) |

=== Mash'al Mubarek ===
In: Note: Flags indicate national team as defined under FIFA eligibility rules; some limited exceptions apply. Players may hold more than one non-FIFA nationality.

| No. | Pos. | Nation | Player |
|---|---|---|---|
| — | DF | FIN | Toni Lindberg (from (Finland) MYPA) |
| — | DF | KAZ | Ilya Fomitchev (from (Finland) AC Oulu) |
| — | MF | UZB | Bobir Davlatov (from (Uzbekistan) FK Yangiyer) |

Out: Note: Flags indicate national team as defined under FIFA eligibility rules; some limited exceptions apply. Players may hold more than one non-FIFA nationality.

| No. | Pos. | Nation | Player |
|---|---|---|---|
| — | DF | SRB | Dаrko Stаnojević (to (Uzbekistan) Olmaliq FK) |
| — | DF | UZB | Siroj Khamroev (to (Uzbekistan) Olmaliq FK) |
| 5 | DF | UZB | Nasim Shoimov (to (Uzbekistan) Neftchi Farg'ona) |
| 9 | FW | UZB | Zafar Kholmurodov (free transfer to (Uzbekistan) Olmaliq FK) |
| 24 | MF | UZB | Botir Qodirqulov (to (Uzbekistan) FC Shurtan Guzar) |
| — | MF | UZB | Ma'ruf Murodov (to (Uzbekistan) Olmaliq FK) |

=== Metallurg Bekabad ===
In: Note: Flags indicate national team as defined under FIFA eligibility rules; some limited exceptions apply. Players may hold more than one non-FIFA nationality.

| No. | Pos. | Nation | Player |
|---|---|---|---|
| — | MF | UZB | Javadulla Ibragimov (from (Uzbekistan) FC Shurtan Guzar) |
| — | MF | UZB | Mirgiyos Suleymanov (from (Uzbekistan) Olmaliq FK) |
| — | FW | UZB | Mirturа Аkbаrov (from (Uzbekistan) Olmaliq FK) |
| — | FW | UZB | Shahzodbek Nurmatov (from (Uzbekistan) Oqtepa Tashkent) |

Out: Note: Flags indicate national team as defined under FIFA eligibility rules; some limited exceptions apply. Players may hold more than one non-FIFA nationality.

| No. | Pos. | Nation | Player |

=== Navbahor Namangan ===
In:

Note: Flags indicate national team as defined under FIFA eligibility rules; some limited exceptions apply. Players may hold more than one non-FIFA nationality.

| No. | Pos. | Nation | Player |
|---|---|---|---|
| — | GK | UZB | Akmal Ortiqov (from (Uzbekistan) Chust-Pakhtakor) |
| — | DF | UZB | Elyor Sohadullaev (from (Uzbekistan) FK Kosonsoy) |
| — | DF | TKM | Maksim Belyh (from (Turkmenistan) HTTU Aşgabat) |
| 19 | MF | UZB | Sobir Hamidov (from (Uzbekistan) Sogdiana Jizzakh) |
| 22 | MF | RUS | Vladimir Chekunov (from (Russia) FC Okean Nakhodka) |
| 8 | FW | LTU | Artūras Fomenka (from (Uzbekistan) FK Buxoro) |
| 10 | FW | UZB | Alisher Makhmudov (from (Uzbekistan) FC Pakhtakor) |
| 11 | FW | UZB | Jafar Irismetov (from (Uzbekistan) Qizilqum Zarafshon) |
| — | MF | UZB | Zokhid Raupov (from (Uzbekistan) Chust-Pakhtakor) |

Out: Note: Flags indicate national team as defined under FIFA eligibility rules; some limited exceptions apply. Players may hold more than one non-FIFA nationality.

| No. | Pos. | Nation | Player |
|---|---|---|---|
| — | DF | UZB | Bakhriddin Amonov (to (Uzbekistan) FK Buxoro) |
| 2 | DF | UZB | Jamol Otaqulov (to (Uzbekistan) FK Samarqand-Dinamo) |
| 11 | MF | UZB | Otabek Valijonov (to (Uzbekistan) FC Shurtan Guzar) |
| — | FW | UZB | Aleksandr Shadrin (to (Uzbekistan) Lokomotiv Tashkent) |
| — | FW | UZB | Alisher Makhmudov (to (Uzbekistan) FC Pakhtakor) |
| — | FW | UZB | Ruzimboy Ahmedov (to (Uzbekistan) FK Samarqand-Dinamo) |

=== Nasaf Qarshi ===
In: Note: Flags indicate national team as defined under FIFA eligibility rules; some limited exceptions apply. Players may hold more than one non-FIFA nationality.

| No. | Pos. | Nation | Player |
|---|---|---|---|
| — | GK | UZB | Gayratjon Hasanov (from (Uzbekistan) FK Andijan) |
| — | MF | UZB | Sukhrob Ne'matov (from (Uzbekistan) FK Buxoro) |
| — | FW | UZB | Alisher Hotamov (from (Uzbekistan) Durmon-Sport) |

Out: Note: Flags indicate national team as defined under FIFA eligibility rules; some limited exceptions apply. Players may hold more than one non-FIFA nationality.

| No. | Pos. | Nation | Player |
|---|---|---|---|
| — | GK | UKR | Dmytro Kozachenko (to (Ukraine) FC Zorya Luhansk) |
| 35 | GK | UZB | Mikhail Naumov (to (Uzbekistan) FC Shurtan Guzar) |
| 30 | DF | UZB | Asror Aliqulov (to (Uzbekistan) FK Samarqand-Dinamo) |
| — | DF | UZB | Rakhmatullo Berdimurodov (end of loan from (Uzbekistan) FC Shurtan Guzar) |
| 16 | DF | UZB | Artyom Filiposyan (to (Uzbekistan) FC Bunyodkor) |
| — | DF | UZB | Maqsud Hayitov (to (Uzbekistan) FK Andijan) |
| — | DF | UZB | Аdkhаm Nоrmukhаmmedоv (to (Uzbekistan) FK Andijan) |
| — | DF | UZB | Mirjalol Qurbonov (to (Uzbekistan) Olmaliq FK) |
| 29 | DF | UZB | Akhrol Risqullaev (to (Uzbekistan) FK Samarqand-Dinamo) |
| — | MF | UZB | Bahodir Murtazoev (to (Uzbekistan) FK Samarqand-Dinamo) |
| 13 | MF | UZB | Lutfulla Turaev (to (Uzbekistan) FC Bunyodkor) |
| 26 | FW | UZB | Zafar Polvonov (to (Uzbekistan) FK Samarqand-Dinamo) |

=== FK Neftchi Farg'ona ===
In: Note: Flags indicate national team as defined under FIFA eligibility rules; some limited exceptions apply. Players may hold more than one non-FIFA nationality.

| No. | Pos. | Nation | Player |
|---|---|---|---|
| — | DF | UZB | Nasim Shoimov (to (Uzbekistan) Mash'al Mubarek) |

Out: Note: Flags indicate national team as defined under FIFA eligibility rules; some limited exceptions apply. Players may hold more than one non-FIFA nationality.

| No. | Pos. | Nation | Player |
|---|---|---|---|
| — | GK | UZB | Yuriy Tsoy (to (Uzbekistan) FK Buxoro) |
| — | DF | UZB | Asqar Mukhiddinov (from (Uzbekistan) FK Buxoro) |
| — | DF | UZB | Islom Tukhtakhodjaev (to (Uzbekistan) Lokomotiv Tashkent) |
| — | FW | UZB | Alisher Kholiqov (from (Uzbekistan) FK Buxoro) |
| 17 | FW | UZB | Vakhid Shodiev (from (Uzbekistan) FK Buxoro) |

=== Olmaliq FK ===
In: Note: Flags indicate national team as defined under FIFA eligibility rules; some limited exceptions apply. Players may hold more than one non-FIFA nationality.

| No. | Pos. | Nation | Player |
|---|---|---|---|
| — | GK | TKM | Pavel Harchik (from (Uzbekistan) Qizilqum Zarafshon) |
| — | GK | UZB | Timur Ganiev (from (Uzbekistan) Dynamo Samarkand) |
| — | GK | UZB | Ravshan Jumaniyozov (from (Uzbekistan) Xorazm FK Urganch) |
| — | DF | SRB | Dаrko Stаnojević (from (Uzbekistan) Mash'al Mubarek) |
| — | DF | UZB | Abdulaziz Abdulkhamidov (from (Uzbekistan) Lokomotiv BFK) |
| — | DF | UZB | Siroj Khamroev (from (Uzbekistan) Mash'al Mubarek) |
| — | DF | UZB | Orifjon Mamajonov (from (Uzbekistan) FC Bunyodkor) |
| — | DF | UZB | Shuhrаt Musаev (from (Uzbekistan) Dynamo Samarkand) |
| — | DF | UZB | Mirjalol Qurbonov (from (Uzbekistan) Nasaf Qarshi) |
| — | MF | RUS | Artem Nikitenko (from (Uzbekistan) FK Buxoro) |
| — | MF | UZB | Ma'ruf Murodov (from (Uzbekistan) Mash'al Mubarek) |
| — | FW | UZB | Zafar Kholmurodov (free, from (Uzbekistan) Mash'al Mubarek) |

Out: Note: Flags indicate national team as defined under FIFA eligibility rules; some limited exceptions apply. Players may hold more than one non-FIFA nationality.

| No. | Pos. | Nation | Player |
|---|---|---|---|
| 50 | GK | UKR | Denys Yershov |
| — | DF | UZB | Akmal Kholiqov (to (Uzbekistan) Qizilqum Zarafshon) |
| 18 | DF | UKR | Ivan Kucherenko |
| 7 | MF | UZB | Dilshod Rakhmatullaev (to (Uzbekistan) Lokomotiv Tashkent) |
| 19 | MF | TKM | Murod Hamroýew |
| — | MF | UZB | Rufat Isroilov |
| — | MF | UZB | Mirgiyos Suleymanov (to (Uzbekistan) Metallurg Bekabad) |
| — | FW | UZB | Mirturа Аkbаrov (to (Uzbekistan) Metallurg Bekabad) |
| 10 | FW | TJK | Moydin Mamazulumov (to (Uzbekistan) FC Shurtan Guzar) |
| — | FW | UZB | Sobir Usmonkhojaev |

=== FC Pakhtakor Tashkent ===
In: Note: Flags indicate national team as defined under FIFA eligibility rules; some limited exceptions apply. Players may hold more than one non-FIFA nationality.

| No. | Pos. | Nation | Player |
|---|---|---|---|
| 33 | DF | JPN | Naoya Shibamura (from (Latvia) FK Ventspils) |
| 8 | FW | MNE | Sanibal Orahovac (from (Montenegro) FK Budućnost Podgorica) |
| 12 | GK | UZB | Aleksander Lobanov (from (Uzbekistan) Jaykhun Nukus) |
| 32 | DF | UZB | Aleksey Nikolaev (from (Uzbekistan) Qizilqum Zarafshon) |
| 15 | MF | UZB | Nodir Odilov (from (Uzbekistan) NBU-Osiyo) |
| — | MF | UZB | Oybek Kilichev (from (Uzbekistan) FK Andijan) |
| 22 | FW | UZB | Shakhboz Erkinov (from (Uzbekistan) FC Shurtan Guzar) |
| 35 | FW | UZB | Alisher Makhmudov (from (Uzbekistan) Navbahor Namangan) |
| 21 | FW | UZB | Bakhriddin Vakhobov (from (Uzbekistan) Qizilqum Zarafshon) |

Out: Note: Flags indicate national team as defined under FIFA eligibility rules; some limited exceptions apply. Players may hold more than one non-FIFA nationality.

| No. | Pos. | Nation | Player |
|---|---|---|---|
| — | FW | MKD | Dušan Savić |
| — | GK | UZB | Eldor Tadjibaev (on loan to (Uzbekistan) Qizilqum Zarafshon) |
| — | DF | UZB | Temur Kagirov (on loan to (Uzbekistan) Qizilqum Zarafshon) |
| — | DF | UZB | Kamoliddin Tajiev (on loan to (China) Jiangsu Sainty F.C.) |
| — | DF | UZB | Ghulom Urunov (to (Uzbekistan) Qizilqum Zarafshon) |
| — | MF | UZB | Akram Bakhridtinov (to (Uzbekistan) FK Andijan) |
| — | MF | UZB | Azamat Bobojonov (on loan to (Uzbekistan) Qizilqum Zarafshon) |
| — | MF | UZB | Farkhod Nishonov (on loan to (Uzbekistan) Qizilqum Zarafshon) |
| 18 | FW | UZB | Sanat Shikhov (on loan to (Uzbekistan) Qizilqum Zarafshon) |
| 35 | FW | UZB | Alisher Makhmudov (to (Uzbekistan) Navbahor Namangan) |

=== Qizilqum Zarafshon ===
In: Note: Flags indicate national team as defined under FIFA eligibility rules; some limited exceptions apply. Players may hold more than one non-FIFA nationality.

| No. | Pos. | Nation | Player |
|---|---|---|---|
| — | GK | UZB | Oybek Abdiev (from (Uzbekistan) Zarafshon-NCZ) |
| — | GK | UZB | Artyom Makosin (from (Uzbekistan) Zarafshon-NCZ) |
| — | GK | UZB | Eldor Tajibaev (on loan from (Uzbekistan) FC Pakhtakor) |
| — | DF | UZB | Avaz Agaliev (from (Uzbekistan) FC Shurtan Guzar) |
| — | DF | UZB | Inomjon Atabaev (from (Uzbekistan) Sogdiana Jizzakh) |
| — | DF | UZB | Temur Kagirov (on loan from (Uzbekistan) FC Pakhtakor) |
| — | DF | UZB | Akmal Kholiqov (from (Uzbekistan) Olmaliq FK) |
| — | DF | UZB | Ghulom Urunov (from (Uzbekistan) FC Pakhtakor) |
| — | DF | RUS | Andrei Usachyov (from (Lithuania) FK Banga Gargždai) |
| — | DF | UZB | Ilya Ilyin (from (Uzbekistan) Xorazm FK Urganch) |
| — | MF | UZB | Azamat Bobojonov (on loan from (Uzbekistan) FC Pakhtakor) |
| — | FW | UZB | Tulqin Mirzaev (from (Uzbekistan) FC Erkurgan) |
| — | MF | UZB | Farkhod Nishonov (on loan from (Uzbekistan) FC Pakhtakor) |
| — | FW | UZB | Temur Vasilyev (from (Uzbekistan) Xorazm FK Urganch) |
| 18 | FW | UZB | Sanat Shikhov (on loan from (Uzbekistan) FC Pakhtakor) |

Out: Note: Flags indicate national team as defined under FIFA eligibility rules; some limited exceptions apply. Players may hold more than one non-FIFA nationality.

| No. | Pos. | Nation | Player |
|---|---|---|---|
| — | GK | TKM | Pavel Harchik (to (Uzbekistan) Olmaliq FK) |
| — | DF | UZB | Оbid Jurаboev (to (Uzbekistan) FC Shurtan Guzar) |
| — | DF | UZB | Aleksey Nikolaev (to (Uzbekistan) FC Pakhtakor) |
| — | DF | UZB | Akmal Rustamov (to (Uzbekistan) FK Buxoro) |
| — | DF | UZB | Nikita Sviridov (to (Uzbekistan) FK Samarqand-Dinamo) |
| — | MF | UZB | Leonid Koshelev (to (Uzbekistan) FK Samarqand-Dinamo) |
| — | FW | UZB | Bakhriddin Vakhobov (to (Uzbekistan) FC Pakhtakor) |
| — | FW | UZB | Jafar Irismetov (to (Uzbekistan) Navbahor Namangan) |

=== FK Samarqand-Dinamo ===
In: Note: Flags indicate national team as defined under FIFA eligibility rules; some limited exceptions apply. Players may hold more than one non-FIFA nationality.

| No. | Pos. | Nation | Player |
|---|---|---|---|
| — | GK | UZB | Igor Mikhailov (from (Uzbekistan) FK Andijan) |
| — | DF | UZB | Jamol Otaqulov (from (Uzbekistan) Navbahor Namangan) |
| — | DF | UZB | Akhrol Risqullaev (from (Uzbekistan) Nasaf Qarshi) |
| — | DF | UZB | Nikita Sviridov (from (Uzbekistan) Qizilqum Zarafshon) |
| — | MF | UZB | Leonid Koshelev (from (Uzbekistan) Qizilqum Zarafshon) |
| — | MF | UZB | Bahodir Murtazoev (from (Uzbekistan) Nasaf Qarshi) |
| — | MF | UZB | Khislat Usmonov (from (Uzbekistan) Olmaliq FK) |
| — | FW | UZB | Zafar Polvonov (from (Uzbekistan) Nasaf Qarshi) |
| — | FW | UZB | Ruzimboy Ahmedov (from (Uzbekistan) Navbahor Namangan) |
| — | FW | UZB | Kamron Khusanov (from (Uzbekistan) NBU-Osiyo) |
| — | FW | UZB | Vladislav Aleksin (from (Uzbekistan) Zarafshon-NCZ) |

Out: Note: Flags indicate national team as defined under FIFA eligibility rules; some limited exceptions apply. Players may hold more than one non-FIFA nationality.

| No. | Pos. | Nation | Player |
|---|---|---|---|
| — | GK | UZB | Timur Ganiev (to (Uzbekistan) Olmaliq FK) |
| 1 | GK | UKR | Andrei Melnichuk |
| 16 | GK | UZB | Aziz Ashurov (to (Uzbekistan) Lokomotiv Tashkent) |
| — | DF | UZB | Shuhrаt Musаev (to (Uzbekistan) Olmaliq FK) |
| — | DF | UZB | Doniyor Usmanov (to (Uzbekistan) FK Buxoro) |
| 10 | FW | UZB | Viktor Klishin (to (Uzbekistan) FC Shurtan Guzar) |

=== FC Shurtan Guzar ===
In: Note: Flags indicate national team as defined under FIFA eligibility rules; some limited exceptions apply. Players may hold more than one non-FIFA nationality.

| No. | Pos. | Nation | Player |
|---|---|---|---|
| 1 | GK | UZB | Mikhail Naumov (from (Uzbekistan) Nasaf Qarshi) |
| 2 | DF | UZB | Оbid Jurаboev (Transferred from (Uzbekistan) Qizilqum Zarafshon) |
| 8 | DF | CIV | Taïna Adama Soro (from (Belarus) FC Minsk) |
| 24 | MF | UZB | Botir Qodirqulov (from (Uzbekistan) Mash'al Mubarek) |
| 7 | MF | UZB | Otabek Valijonov (from (Uzbekistan) Navbahor Namangan) |
| 16 | FW | UZB | Viktor Klishin (from (Uzbekistan) Dynamo Samarkand) |
| 10 | FW | TJK | Moydin Mamazulumov (from (Uzbekistan) Olmaliq FK) |
| 18 | FW | BLR | Vitaly Rushnitsky (from (Belarus) FC Smorgon) |
| — | DF | UZB | Rakhmatullo Berdimurodov (end of loan to (Uzbekistan) Nasaf Qarshi) |

Out: Note: Flags indicate national team as defined under FIFA eligibility rules; some limited exceptions apply. Players may hold more than one non-FIFA nationality.

| No. | Pos. | Nation | Player |
|---|---|---|---|
| — | DF | UZB | Avaz Agaliev (to (Uzbekistan) Qizilqum Zarafshon) |
| — | MF | UZB | Javadulla Ibragimov (to (Uzbekistan) Metallurg Bekabad) |
| — | FW | UZB | Shakhboz Erkinov (to (Uzbekistan) FC Pakhtakor) |
| — | MF | SRB | Predrag Vujović |

== Summer 2012 transfers ==
=== FK Andijan ===
In: Note: Flags indicate national team as defined under FIFA eligibility rules; some limited exceptions apply. Players may hold more than one non-FIFA nationality.

| No. | Pos. | Nation | Player |
|---|---|---|---|
| — | GK | GEO | Mikheil Alavidze (from (Georgia (country)) FC Dinamo Batumi) |
| — | FW | GEO | Levan Mdivnishvili (from (Georgia (country)) FC Kolkheti-1913 Poti) |
| — | FW | TJK | Moydin Mamazulumov (from (Uzbekistan) FC Shurtan Guzar) |
| — | GK | UZB | Yuriy Tsoy (from (Uzbekistan) FK Buxoro) |
| — | DF | UZB | Jasur Urunov (from (Uzbekistan) FC Yoshlik) |
| — | MF | UZB | Muqim Toshmatov (from (Uzbekistan) Sogdiana Jizzakh) |
| — | MF | UZB | Otabek Valijonov (from (Uzbekistan) FC Shurtan Guzar) |
| — | | UZB | Doniyor Usmomov |
| — | | UZB | Rakhmatullo Meliboev |

Out: Note: Flags indicate national team as defined under FIFA eligibility rules; some limited exceptions apply. Players may hold more than one non-FIFA nationality.

| No. | Pos. | Nation | Player |
|---|---|---|---|
| — | GK | BLR | Aleksandr Petukhov |
| — | MF | MDA | Аlеxei Cаsian (to (Moldova) FC Iskra-Stal) |
| — | MF | RUS | Vladimir Shishelov (to (Uzbekistan) Nasaf Qarshi) |
| 25 | DF | UKR | Oleksandr Polovkov |
| 15 | FW | TJK | Farhod Tohirov |
| — | MF | UZB | Akram Bakhridtinov |
| — | MF | UZB | Anvar Rahimov |
| — | MF | UZB | Sanjar Turakulov |

=== FC Bunyodkor ===
In: Note: Flags indicate national team as defined under FIFA eligibility rules; some limited exceptions apply. Players may hold more than one non-FIFA nationality.

| No. | Pos. | Nation | Player |
|---|---|---|---|
| 25 | GK | UZB | Zafar Safaev (from (Uzbekistan) Bunyodkor-2) |
| 19 | MF | UZB | Jasur Hasanov (from (United Arab Emirates) Emirates Club) |
| 9 | FW | UZB | Ilkhom Shomurodov (on loan from (Uzbekistan) Nasaf Qarshi) |
| 11 | FW | UZB | Rasuljon Shukhratov (from (Uzbekistan) FK Yangiyer) |

Out: Note: Flags indicate national team as defined under FIFA eligibility rules; some limited exceptions apply. Players may hold more than one non-FIFA nationality.

| No. | Pos. | Nation | Player |
|---|---|---|---|
| 25 | GK | UZB | Nodir Ibrakhimov |
| 11 | DF | KGZ | Emil Kenzhesariev (to (Kazakhstan) FC Aktobe) |
| 19 | MF | UZB | Yannis Mandzukas (to (Uzbekistan) Mash'al Mubarek) |
| 9 | FW | UZB | Anvar Rajabov (to (Thailand) Buriram United) |
| 7 | MF | AUS | David Carney (released) |

=== FK Buxoro ===
In: Note: Flags indicate national team as defined under FIFA eligibility rules; some limited exceptions apply. Players may hold more than one non-FIFA nationality.

| No. | Pos. | Nation | Player |
|---|---|---|---|
| — | DF | JPN | Naoya Shibamura (from (Uzbekistan) FC Pakhtakor) |
| — | DF | NGA | David Oniya (from (Uzbekistan) Sogdiana Jizzakh) |
| — | DF | UZB | Aleksey Nikolaev (from (Uzbekistan) FC Pakhtakor) |
| — | DF | UZB | Akmal Kholmurodov (on loan from (Uzbekistan) FC Pakhtakor) |
| — | DF | UZB | Nosirbek Otakuziyev (on loan from (Uzbekistan) FK Buxoro) |
| — | FW | UZB | Bakhriddin Vakhobov (on loan from (Uzbekistan) Qizilqum Zarafshon) |

Out: Note: Flags indicate national team as defined under FIFA eligibility rules; some limited exceptions apply. Players may hold more than one non-FIFA nationality.

| No. | Pos. | Nation | Player |
|---|---|---|---|
| — | GK | UZB | Yuriy Tsoy (to (Uzbekistan) FK Andijan) |
| 20 | FW | GEO | Mikheil Kakaladze |
| 23 | DF | UKR | Oleksandr Tarasenko |
| — | FW | UZB | Alisher Kholiqov (to (Uzbekistan) Qizilqum Zarafshon) |

=== Lokomotiv Tashkent ===
In: Note: Flags indicate national team as defined under FIFA eligibility rules; some limited exceptions apply. Players may hold more than one non-FIFA nationality.

| No. | Pos. | Nation | Player |
|---|---|---|---|
| — | FW | LTU | Artūras Fomenka (from (Uzbekistan) Navbahor Namangan) |
| — | MF | TJK | Akmal Kholmatov (from (Iran) PAS Hamedan F.C.) |
| — | MF | UZB | Ayubhon Gapparov (from (Russia) FC Rubin Kazan) |
| — | MF | UZB | Ildar Magdeev (from (Uzbekistan) FC Pakhtakor) |

Out: Note: Flags indicate national team as defined under FIFA eligibility rules; some limited exceptions apply. Players may hold more than one non-FIFA nationality.

| No. | Pos. | Nation | Player |
|---|---|---|---|
| 15 | MF | FRA | Mahamat-Bindi Moustapha |
| — | DF | UZB | Bakhtiyor Ashurmatov (retired) |
| — | MF | UZB | Temur Ayzatullov (to (Uzbekistan) Olmaliq FK) |
| — | MF | UZB | Muzaffar Umrzoqov (to (Uzbekistan) Qizilqum Zarafshon) |
| — | FW | UZB | Olim Navkarov (to (Uzbekistan) FK Samarqand-Dinamo) |

=== Mash'al Mubarek ===
In: Note: Flags indicate national team as defined under FIFA eligibility rules; some limited exceptions apply. Players may hold more than one non-FIFA nationality.

| No. | Pos. | Nation | Player |
|---|---|---|---|
| — | FW | UZB | Pavel Solomin |

Out: Note: Flags indicate national team as defined under FIFA eligibility rules; some limited exceptions apply. Players may hold more than one non-FIFA nationality.

| No. | Pos. | Nation | Player |
|---|---|---|---|
| — | DF | FIN | Toni Lindberg |
| — | DF | KAZ | Ilya Fomitchev |
| — | DF | UZB | Vitaliy Pochuev (to (Uzbekistan) FK Samarqand-Dinamo) |
| — | FW | UZB | Sohib Abdullaev (to (Uzbekistan) Navbahor Namangan) |

=== Metallurg Bekabad ===
In: Note: Flags indicate national team as defined under FIFA eligibility rules; some limited exceptions apply. Players may hold more than one non-FIFA nationality.

| No. | Pos. | Nation | Player |

Out: Note: Flags indicate national team as defined under FIFA eligibility rules; some limited exceptions apply. Players may hold more than one non-FIFA nationality.

| No. | Pos. | Nation | Player |
|---|---|---|---|
| — | FW | UZB | Murod Rahmonov (to (Uzbekistan) Navbahor Namangan) |

=== Nasaf Qarshi ===
In: Note: Flags indicate national team as defined under FIFA eligibility rules; some limited exceptions apply. Players may hold more than one non-FIFA nationality.

| No. | Pos. | Nation | Player |
|---|---|---|---|
| 55 | MF | RUS | Vladimir Shishelov (from (Uzbekistan) FK Andijan) |
| 25 | DF | SRB | Aleksandar Petrović |

Out: Note: Flags indicate national team as defined under FIFA eligibility rules; some limited exceptions apply. Players may hold more than one non-FIFA nationality.

| No. | Pos. | Nation | Player |
|---|---|---|---|
| 34 | DF | SRB | Bojan Mališić (to (Ukraine) FC Hoverla Uzhhorod) |
| — | DF | UZB | Nosirbek Otakuziyev (on loan to (Uzbekistan) FK Buxoro) |
| — | FW | UZB | Ilkhom Shomurodov (on loan to (Uzbekistan) FC Bunyodkor) |

=== Navbahor Namangan ===
In: Note: Flags indicate national team as defined under FIFA eligibility rules; some limited exceptions apply. Players may hold more than one non-FIFA nationality.

| No. | Pos. | Nation | Player |
|---|---|---|---|
| — | DF | BLR | Vital Panasyuk (from (Belarus) FC Smorgon) |
| — | FW | BLR | Nikolay Ryndzyuk (from (Belarus) FC Smorgon) |
| — | FW | UZB | Sohib Abdullaev (from (Uzbekistan) Mash'al Mubarek) |
| — | FW | UZB | Abdurazzoq Juraev (from (Uzbekistan) Olmaliq FK) |
| — | FW | UZB | Murod Rahmonov (from (Uzbekistan) Metallurg Bekabad) |
| — | FW | UZB | Rinat Bayramov |
| — | FW | UZB | Davron Isoqov |
| — | | UZB | Rustam Boqiev |

Out: Note: Flags indicate national team as defined under FIFA eligibility rules; some limited exceptions apply. Players may hold more than one non-FIFA nationality.

| No. | Pos. | Nation | Player |
|---|---|---|---|
| 8 | FW | LTU | Artūras Fomenka (to (Uzbekistan) Lokomotiv Tashkent) |
| 22 | MF | RUS | Vladimir Chekunov |
| 9 | MF | UZB | Sanjar Аsqаrаliev |
| 17 | MF | UZB | Ilhom Boydedaev (to (Uzbekistan) Dynamo Samarkand) |

=== Olmaliq FK ===
In: Note: Flags indicate national team as defined under FIFA eligibility rules; some limited exceptions apply. Players may hold more than one non-FIFA nationality.

| No. | Pos. | Nation | Player |
|---|---|---|---|
| — | MF | UZB | Temur Ayzatullov (from (Uzbekistan) Lokomotiv Tashkent) |

Out: Note: Flags indicate national team as defined under FIFA eligibility rules; some limited exceptions apply. Players may hold more than one non-FIFA nationality.

| No. | Pos. | Nation | Player |
|---|---|---|---|
| — | FW | UZB | Abdurazzoq Juraev (to (Uzbekistan) Navbahor Namangan) |

=== FC Pakhtakor ===
In: Note: Flags indicate national team as defined under FIFA eligibility rules; some limited exceptions apply. Players may hold more than one non-FIFA nationality.

| No. | Pos. | Nation | Player |

Out: Note: Flags indicate national team as defined under FIFA eligibility rules; some limited exceptions apply. Players may hold more than one non-FIFA nationality.

| No. | Pos. | Nation | Player |
|---|---|---|---|
| 33 | DF | JPN | Naoya Shibamura (to (Uzbekistan) FK Buxoro) |
| 25 | FW | GEO | Irakli Klimiashvili (end of loan from (Russia) FC Anzhi) |
| — | DF | UZB | Aleksey Nikolaev (to (Uzbekistan) FK Buxoro) |
| 16 | DF | UZB | Akmal Kholmurodov (on loan to (Uzbekistan) FK Buxoro) |
| 20 | MF | UZB | Ildar Magdeev (to (Uzbekistan) Lokomotiv Tashkent) |
| 21 | FW | UZB | Bakhriddin Vakhobov (on loan to (Uzbekistan) FK Buxoro) |
| — | FW | UZB | Farhod Tojiyev (to (Uzbekistan) FC Shurtan Guzar) |

=== Qizilqum Zarafshon ===
In: Note: Flags indicate national team as defined under FIFA eligibility rules; some limited exceptions apply. Players may hold more than one non-FIFA nationality.

| No. | Pos. | Nation | Player |
|---|---|---|---|
| — | GK | LTU | Pavelas Leusas (from (Lithuania) FK Buxoro) |
| — | MF | UZB | Muzaffar Umrzoqov (from (Uzbekistan) Lokomotiv Tashkent) |
| — | FW | UZB | Alisher Kholiqov (from (Uzbekistan) FK Buxoro) |

Out: Note: Flags indicate national team as defined under FIFA eligibility rules; some limited exceptions apply. Players may hold more than one non-FIFA nationality.

| No. | Pos. | Nation | Player |
|---|---|---|---|
| — | FW | UZB | Abdurazzoq Juraev (to (Uzbekistan) Navbahor Namangan) |

=== FK Samarqand-Dinamo ===
In: Note: Flags indicate national team as defined under FIFA eligibility rules; some limited exceptions apply. Players may hold more than one non-FIFA nationality.

| No. | Pos. | Nation | Player |
|---|---|---|---|
| — | DF | UZB | Vitaliy Pochuev (to (Uzbekistan) Lokomotiv Tashkent) |
| — | MF | UZB | Ilhom Boydedaev (from (Uzbekistan) Navbahor Namangan) |
| — | MF | UZB | Asqar Jadigerov (from (Thailand) Buriram United) |
| — | FW | UZB | Olim Navkarov (from (Uzbekistan) Lokomotiv Tashkent) |

Out: Note: Flags indicate national team as defined under FIFA eligibility rules; some limited exceptions apply. Players may hold more than one non-FIFA nationality.

| No. | Pos. | Nation | Player |

=== FC Shurtan Guzar ===
In: Note: Flags indicate national team as defined under FIFA eligibility rules; some limited exceptions apply. Players may hold more than one non-FIFA nationality.

| No. | Pos. | Nation | Player |
|---|---|---|---|
| — | FW | GEO | Giorgi Megreladze (from (Georgia (country)) Torpedo Kutaisi) |
| — | FW | UZB | Farhod Tojiyev (from (Uzbekistan) FC Pakhtakor) |

Out: Note: Flags indicate national team as defined under FIFA eligibility rules; some limited exceptions apply. Players may hold more than one non-FIFA nationality.

| No. | Pos. | Nation | Player |
|---|---|---|---|
| 18 | FW | BLR | Vitaly Rushnitsky |
| 10 | FW | TJK | Moydin Mamazulumov (to (Uzbekistan) FK Andijan) |
| 7 | MF | UZB | Otabek Valijonov (to (Uzbekistan) FK Andijan) |

== Winter 2012 transfers ==
=== Chust-Pakhtakor ===
In: Note: Flags indicate national team as defined under FIFA eligibility rules; some limited exceptions apply. Players may hold more than one non-FIFA nationality.

| No. | Pos. | Nation | Player |

Out: Note: Flags indicate national team as defined under FIFA eligibility rules; some limited exceptions apply. Players may hold more than one non-FIFA nationality.

| No. | Pos. | Nation | Player |
|---|---|---|---|
| — | GK | UZB | Akmal Ortiqov (to (Uzbekistan) Navbahor Namangan) |
| — | MF | UZB | Zokhid Raupov (to (Uzbekistan) Navbahor Namangan) |

=== FC Yoshlik ===
In: Note: Flags indicate national team as defined under FIFA eligibility rules; some limited exceptions apply. Players may hold more than one non-FIFA nationality.

| No. | Pos. | Nation | Player |

Out: Note: Flags indicate national team as defined under FIFA eligibility rules; some limited exceptions apply. Players may hold more than one non-FIFA nationality.

| No. | Pos. | Nation | Player |
|---|---|---|---|
| — | FW | UZB | Tulqin Mirzaev (to (Uzbekistan) Qizilqum Zarafshon) |

=== NBU Osiyo ===
In: Note: Flags indicate national team as defined under FIFA eligibility rules; some limited exceptions apply. Players may hold more than one non-FIFA nationality.

| No. | Pos. | Nation | Player |

Out: Note: Flags indicate national team as defined under FIFA eligibility rules; some limited exceptions apply. Players may hold more than one non-FIFA nationality.

| No. | Pos. | Nation | Player |
|---|---|---|---|
| — | FW | UZB | Kamron Khusanov (to (Uzbekistan) FK Samarqand-Dinamo) |

=== Oqtepa Tashkent ===
In: Note: Flags indicate national team as defined under FIFA eligibility rules; some limited exceptions apply. Players may hold more than one non-FIFA nationality.

| No. | Pos. | Nation | Player |
|---|---|---|---|
| — | DF | UZB | Afzal Azizov (from (Uzbekistan) Sogdiana Jizzakh) |
| — | FW | UZB | Vladimir Baranov (from (Uzbekistan) Xorazm FK Urganch) |

Out: Note: Flags indicate national team as defined under FIFA eligibility rules; some limited exceptions apply. Players may hold more than one non-FIFA nationality.

| No. | Pos. | Nation | Player |
|---|---|---|---|
| — | DF | UZB | Inomjon Atabaev (from (Uzbekistan) Qizilqum Zarafshon) |
| — | FW | UZB | Shahzodbek Nurmatov (to (Uzbekistan) Metallurg Bekabad) |

=== Sogdiana Jizzakh ===
In: Note: Flags indicate national team as defined under FIFA eligibility rules; some limited exceptions apply. Players may hold more than one non-FIFA nationality.

| No. | Pos. | Nation | Player |

Out: Note: Flags indicate national team as defined under FIFA eligibility rules; some limited exceptions apply. Players may hold more than one non-FIFA nationality.

| No. | Pos. | Nation | Player |
|---|---|---|---|
| — | DF | UZB | Afzal Azizov (to (Uzbekistan) Oqtepa Tashkent) |
| — | DF | UZB | Inomjon Atabaev (to (Uzbekistan) Qizilqum Zarafshon) |

=== FK Yangiyer ===
In: Note: Flags indicate national team as defined under FIFA eligibility rules; some limited exceptions apply. Players may hold more than one non-FIFA nationality.

| No. | Pos. | Nation | Player |

Out: Note: Flags indicate national team as defined under FIFA eligibility rules; some limited exceptions apply. Players may hold more than one non-FIFA nationality.

| No. | Pos. | Nation | Player |
|---|---|---|---|
| — | GK | UZB | Nodir Ibrakhimov (to (Uzbekistan) FC Bunyodkor) |
| — | MF | UZB | Bobir Davlatov (to (Uzbekistan) Mash'al Mubarek) |

=== Xorazm FK Urganch ===
In: Note: Flags indicate national team as defined under FIFA eligibility rules; some limited exceptions apply. Players may hold more than one non-FIFA nationality.

| No. | Pos. | Nation | Player |

Out: Note: Flags indicate national team as defined under FIFA eligibility rules; some limited exceptions apply. Players may hold more than one non-FIFA nationality.

| No. | Pos. | Nation | Player |
|---|---|---|---|
| 3 | DF | UZB | Azamat Isaev (to (Uzbekistan) FK Andijan) |
| — | DF | UZB | Ilya Ilyin (to (Uzbekistan) Qizilqum Zarafshon) |
| — | FW | UZB | Temur Vasilyev (to (Uzbekistan) Qizilqum Zarafshon) |
| — | FW | UZB | Vladimir Baranov (to (Uzbekistan) Oqtepa Tashkent) |

== Summer 2012 transfers ==
=== FC Bunyodkor-2 ===
In: Note: Flags indicate national team as defined under FIFA eligibility rules; some limited exceptions apply. Players may hold more than one non-FIFA nationality.

| No. | Pos. | Nation | Player |

Out: Note: Flags indicate national team as defined under FIFA eligibility rules; some limited exceptions apply. Players may hold more than one non-FIFA nationality.

| No. | Pos. | Nation | Player |
|---|---|---|---|
| — | GK | UZB | Zafar Safaev (to (Uzbekistan) FC Bunyodkor) |

=== FK Yangiyer ===
In: Note: Flags indicate national team as defined under FIFA eligibility rules; some limited exceptions apply. Players may hold more than one non-FIFA nationality.

| No. | Pos. | Nation | Player |

Out: Note: Flags indicate national team as defined under FIFA eligibility rules; some limited exceptions apply. Players may hold more than one non-FIFA nationality.

| No. | Pos. | Nation | Player |
|---|---|---|---|
| — | FW | UZB | Rasuljon Shukhratov (to (Uzbekistan) FC Bunyodkor) |

== See also ==
- 2012 Uzbek League
- List of Uzbek football transfers 2010
- List of Uzbek football transfers 2011
