= 2012 Pakhtakor Tashkent FK season =

Pakhtakor Tashkent FK
2012 season
- Chairman: Samvel Babayan
- Manager: Dejan Đurđević (until 19 June); Murod Ismailov (Interim) (from 19 June)
- Uzbek League: Champions
- Uzbek Cup: Semifinal vs Bunyodkor
- AFC Champions League: Group stage
- Top goalscorer: League: Temurkhuja Abdukholiqov (13); All: Temurkhuja Abdukholiqov (18)
Home colours	Away colours

The 2012 season was Pakhtakors 21st season in the top Uzbek League in Uzbekistan. Pakhtakor competed in Uzbek League, Uzbek Cup and AFC Champions League tournaments.

== Season events ==
Prior to the start of the season, Dejan Đurđević was appointed as the clubs new Head Coach, and the signing of Sanibal Orahovac from FK Budućnost Podgorica.

On 17 February, Pakhtakor Tashkent announced the signing of Naoya Shibamura from Ventspils.

On 21 February, Pakhtakor Tashkent presented their new signings for the season, Sanibal Orahovac, Naoya Shibamura, Shakhboz Erkinov, Nodir Odilov, Aleksey Nikolaev, Bakhriddin Vakhobov, Alisher Makhmudov and Aleksandr Lobanov.

== Squad ==
As of match played 14 November 2012

No.	Name	Nationality	Position	Date of birth (age)	Signed from	Signed in	Contract ends	Apps.	Goals
Goalkeepers
1	Nikita Ribkin	(Uzbekistan)	GK	20 January 1992 (aged 20)	Academy	2010			
12	Alexander Lobanov	(Uzbekistan)	GK	4 January 1986 (aged 26)	Jaykhun Nukus	2012	2014		
30	Temur Juraev	(Uzbekistan)	GK	12 May 1984 (aged 28)	Qizilqum Zarafshon	2004			
Defenders
2	Egor Krimets	(Uzbekistan)	DF	27 January 1992 (aged 20)	Academy	2010			
4	Bojan Miladinović	(Serbia)	DF	24 April 1982 (aged 30)	Napredak Kruševac	2009			
6	Murod Kholmukhamedov	(Uzbekistan)	DF	23 December 1990 (aged 21)	Academy	2008			
13	Aleksandr Kletskov	(Uzbekistan)	DF	27 September 1985 (aged 27)	Tianjin Teda	2011			
24	Davron Khashimov	(Uzbekistan)	DF	24 November 1992 (aged 20)	Academy	2011			
27	Ilhom Suyunov	(Uzbekistan)	DF	17 May 1983 (aged 29)	Mash'al Mubarek	2004			
29	Vladimir Kozak	(Uzbekistan)	DF	12 June 1993 (aged 19)	Academy	2010			
Midfielders
5	Akbar Ismatullaev	(Uzbekistan)	MF	10 January 1991 (aged 21)	Academy	2009			
7	Kakhi Makharadze	(Georgia (country))	MF	20 October 1987 (aged 25)	Lokomotiv Tashkent	2011			
14	Sherzod Karimov	(Uzbekistan)	MF	26 January 1989 (aged 23)	Qizilqum Zarafshon	2009			
15	Jamshid Iskanderov	(Uzbekistan)	MF	16 October 1993 (aged 19)	Dinamo Samarqand	2011			
17	Aram Babayan	(Uzbekistan)	MF	3 August 1992 (aged 20)	Academy	2012			
19	Bekzod Mirkhaydarov	(Uzbekistan)	MF	26 January 1991 (aged 21)	Academy	2011			
26	Dilshod Sharofetdinov	(Uzbekistan)	MF	15 October 1985 (aged 27)	Dinamo Samarqand	2009			
28	Stanislav Andreev	(Uzbekistan)	MF	6 May 1988 (aged 24)	Topalang Sariosiyo	2007			
34	Oybek Kilichev	(Uzbekistan)	MF	17 January 1989 (aged 23)	Andijon	2012			
37	Abdullokh Olimov	(Uzbekistan)	MF	11 February 1993 (aged 19)	Academy	2012			
38	Abbosbek Makhstaliev	(Uzbekistan)	MF	12 January 1994 (aged 18)	Academy	2011			
	Nodir Odilov	(Uzbekistan)	MF	6 July 1990 (aged 22)	NBU Osiyo	2012	2016		
Forwards
8	Sanibal Orahovac	(Montenegro)	FW	12 December 1978 (aged 33)	Budućnost Podgorica	2012	2012		
9	Temurkhuja Abdukholiqov	(Uzbekistan)	FW	25 September 1991 (aged 21)	Bunyodkor	2011			
19	Igor Sergeyev	(Uzbekistan)	FW	30 April 1993 (aged 19)	Academy	2011			
22	Shakhboz Erkinov	(Uzbekistan)	FW	23 August 1994 (aged 18)	Shurtan Guzar	2012	2012 (+1)		
23	Alisher Azizov	(Uzbekistan)	FW	14 February 1990 (aged 22)	Academy	2009			
31	Timur Khakimov	(Uzbekistan)	FW	23 August 1994 (aged 18)	Academy	2011			
	Farrukh Shotursunov	(Uzbekistan)	FW	11 May 1992 (aged 20)	Academy	2012			
Players away on loan
3	Gulom Urunov	(Uzbekistan)	DF	7 June 1989 (aged 23)	Academy	2009			
16	Akmal Kholmurodov	(Uzbekistan)	DF	4 January 1989 (aged 23)	Navbahor Namangan	2010			
18	Sanat Shikhov	(Uzbekistan)	FW	28 December 1989 (aged 22)	Shaykhontohur	2008			
21	Bakhriddin Vakhobov	(Uzbekistan)	FW	23 January 1983 (aged 29)	Qizilqum Zarafshon	2012	2013		
33	Eldor Tajibaev	(Uzbekistan)	GK	3 June 1986 (aged 26)	Navbahor Namangan	2009			
	Temur Kagirov	(Uzbekistan)	DF	24 May 1985 (aged 27)	Academy	2010			
Players who left during the season
10	Farhod Tadjiyev	(Uzbekistan)	FW	9 April 1986 (aged 26)	Tianjin Teda	2010			
11	Irakli Klimiashvili	(Georgia (country))	MF	30 May 1988 (aged 24)	on loan from Anzhi Makhachkala	2011	2012		
20	Ildar Magdeev	(Uzbekistan)	MF	11 April 1984 (aged 28)	Buxoro	2002			
32	Aleksey Nikolaev	(Uzbekistan)	DF	5 September 1979 (aged 33)	Qizilqum Zarafshon	2012	2013		
33	Naoya Shibamura	(Japan)	DF	11 September 1982 (aged 30)	Ventspils	2012	2012		
	Alisher Makhmudov	(Uzbekistan)	MF	25 January 1986 (aged 26)	Navbahor Namangan	2012	2013	0	0

== Transfers ==
=== In ===
Date	Position	Nationality	Name	From	Fee	Ref.
1 January 2012	FW	(Montenegro)	Sanibal Orahovac	Budućnost Podgorica	Undisclosed	
17 February 2012	DF	(Japan)	Naoya Shibamura	Ventspils	Undisclosed	
21 February 2012	GK	(Uzbekistan)	Aleksandr Lobanov	Jaykhun Nukus	Undisclosed	
21 February 2012	DF	(Uzbekistan)	Aleksey Nikolaev	Qizilqum Zarafshon	Undisclosed	
21 February 2012	MF	(Uzbekistan)	Nodir Odilov	NBU Osiyo	Undisclosed	
21 February 2012	MF	(Uzbekistan)	Oybek Kilichev	Andijon	Undisclosed	
21 February 2012	FW	(Uzbekistan)	Shakhboz Erkinov	Shurtan Guzar	Undisclosed	
21 February 2012	FW	(Uzbekistan)	Alisher Makhmudov	Navbahor Namangan	Undisclosed	
21 February 2012	FW	(Uzbekistan)	Bakhriddin Vakhobov	Qizilqum Zarafshon	Undisclosed	

=== Loans in ===
Start date	Position	Nationality	Name	From	End date	Ref.
1 August 2011	MF	(Georgia (country))	Irakli Klimiashvili	Anzhi Makhachkala	30 June 2012	

=== Out ===
Start date	Position	Nationality	Name	To	Fee	Ref.
1 March 2012	FW	(Uzbekistan)	Alisher Makhmudov	Navbahor Namangan	Undisclosed	
26 June 2012	MF	(Uzbekistan)	Ildar Magdeev	Lokomotiv Tashkent	Undisclosed	
1 September 2012	DF	(Japan)	Naoya Shibamura	Buxoro	Undisclosed	
1 September 2012	DF	(Uzbekistan)	Aleksey Nikolaev	Buxoro	Undisclosed	
1 September 2012	FW	(Uzbekistan)	Farhod Tadjiyev	Shurtan Guzar	Undisclosed	

=== Loans out ===
Start date	Position	Nationality	Name	To	End date	Ref.
1 January 2012	MF	(Uzbekistan)	Azamat Bobojonov	Qizilqum Zarafshon	31 December 2012	
2 January 2012	MF	(Uzbekistan)	Bobur Abdurakhmonov	Kohtla-Järve Lootus	31 December 2012	
1 February 2012	GK	(Uzbekistan)	Eldor Tajibaev	Qizilqum Zarafshon	31 December 2012	
1 February 2012	DF	(Uzbekistan)	Temur Kagirov	Qizilqum Zarafshon	31 December 2012	
1 February 2012	MF	(Uzbekistan)	Sanat Shikhov	Qizilqum Zarafshon	31 December 2012	
1 February 2012	FW	(Uzbekistan)	Farkhod Nishonov	Qizilqum Zarafshon	31 December 2012	
1 March 2012	DF	(Uzbekistan)	Gulom Urunov	Qizilqum Zarafshon	31 December 2012	
1 September 2012	DF	(Uzbekistan)	Akmal Kholmurodov	Buxoro	31 December 2012	
1 September 2012	FW	(Uzbekistan)	Bakhriddin Vakhobov	Buxoro	31 December 2012	

=== Released ===
Date	Position	Nationality	Name	Joined	Date	Ref
31 December 2012	DF	(Uzbekistan)	Temur Kagirov	Olmaliq		
31 December 2012	DF	(Uzbekistan)	Aleksandr Kletskov	Dinamo Samarqand		
31 December 2012	MF	(Uzbekistan)	Bekzod Mirkhaydarov			
31 December 2012	MF	(Uzbekistan)	Nodir Odilov			
31 December 2012	FW	(Montenegro)	Sanibal Orahovac	Mladost Podgorica		
31 December 2012	FW	(Uzbekistan)	Shakhboz Erkinov	Olmaliq		
31 December 2012	FW	(Uzbekistan)	Bakhriddin Vakhobov	Buxoro		

== Friendlies ==
10 January 2012	Göztepe (Turkey)	1–1	(Uzbekistan) Pakhtakor Tashkent	Antalya, Turkey
	Şahin 83'		Vakhobov 63'

12 January 2012	VfB Stuttgart (Germany)	4–0	(Uzbekistan) Pakhtakor Tashkent	Antalya, Turkey
	Harnik 4'; Kuzmanović 37' (pen.); Celozzi 76'; Holzhauser 82' (pen.)

16 January 2012	Alanyaspor (Turkey)	0–1	(Uzbekistan) Pakhtakor Tashkent	Antalya, Turkey
			Azizov

28 January 2012 2012 Kadyrov Cup	Polonia Warsaw (Poland)	2–1	(Uzbekistan) Pakhtakor Tashkent	Antalya, Turkey
	Goal		Goal

30 January 2012 2012 Kadyrov Cup	Pakhtakor Tashkent (Uzbekistan)	1–1 (3–2 p)	(Ukraine) Metalist Kharkiv	Antalya, Turkey
	Goal		Goal

1 February 2012 2012 Kadyrov Cup	Neftçi (Azerbaijan)	3–0	(Uzbekistan) Pakhtakor Tashkent	Antalya, Turkey
	Goal

== Competitions ==
Pakhtakor competed in all major competitions: Uzbek League, the Uzbek Cup and the AFC Champions League.

=== Overview ===
Competition	First match	Last match	Starting round	Final position	Record							
Competition	First match	Last match	Starting round	Final position	Pld	W	D	L	GF	GA	GD	Win %
Uzbek League	15 March 2012	21 November 2012	Matchday 1	Winners	26	18	5	3	51	16	+35	69.23
Uzbekistan Cup	29 March 2012	24 November 2012	Round of 32	Semifinal	7	4	2	1	11	8	+3	57.14
AFC Champions League	6 March 2012	16 May 2012	Group Stage	Group Stage	6	2	1	3	6	10	−4	33.33
Total					39	24	8	7	68	34	+34	61.54

Last updated: 24 November 2012
Source: Competitions

=== Uzbek League ===
==== League table ====
Pos	Team	Pld	W	D	L	GF	GA	GD	Pts	Qualification or relegation
1	Pakhtakor Tashkent (Q, C)	26	18	5	3	51	16	+35	59	2013 AFC Champions League Group stage (Note: Lokomotive Tashkent qualified due to Bunyodkor also winning the 2012 Uzbekistan Cup.)
2	Bunyodkor (Q)	26	17	6	3	42	16	+26	57	2013 AFC Champions League Group stage
3	Lokomotiv Tashkent (Q)	26	14	7	5	43	22	+21	49	2013 AFC Champions League Qualifying play-off
4	Nasaf Qarshi	26	14	7	5	37	20	+17	49	
5	Shurtan Guzar	26	12	4	10	38	33	+5	40	

Updated to match(es) played on 21 November 2012. Source: Uzbekistan Professional Football League
Rules for classification: 1) points; 2) goal difference; 3) number of goals scored.
(C) Champions; (Q) Qualified for the phase indicated

==== Results summary ====
Overall								Home						Away					
Pld	W	D	L	GF	GA	GD	Pts	W	D	L	GF	GA	GD	W	D	L	GF	GA	GD
26	18	5	3	51	16	+35	59	9	4	0	27	4	+23	9	1	3	24	12	+12

Last updated: 21 November 2012.
Source: See Results

==== Results ====
15 March 2012 1	Buxoro	0 – 1	Pakhtakor Tashkent	Bukhara
16:00 UZT (UTC+5)	Rustamov (yellow card) 83'	Report	Orahovac 23'; Krimets (yellow card) 67'	Stadium: Buxoro Arena; Attendance: 22,065; Referee: Ravshan Irmatov

24 March 2012 2	Pakhtakor Tashkent	0 – 0	Olmaliq	Tashkent
16:00 UZT (UTC+5)	Makharadze (yellow card) 26'	Report	Abdurahmonov (yellow card) 45+1'; Berdiev (yellow card) 81'; Stanojević (yellow card) 83'	Stadium: JAR Stadium; Attendance: 1,925; Referee: Sultan Zailobidinov

8 April 2012 3	Dinamo Samarqand	0 – 1	Pakhtakor Tashkent	Samarkand
16:00 UZT (UTC+5)	Khvostunov (yellow card) 42'; Risqullaev (yellow card) 69'; Juraev (yellow card) 75'	Report	Abdukholiqov 58'; Sharofetdinov (penalty missed) 70'	Stadium: Dinamo Stadium; Attendance: 6,122; Referee: Valentin Kovalenko

12 April 2012 4	Pakhtakor Tashkent	0 – 0	Nasaf	Tashkent
18:00 UZT (UTC+5)		Report		Stadium: Central Stadium; Attendance: 8,254; Referee: Ravshan Irmatov

27 April 2012 6	Lokomotiv Tashkent	1 – 1	Pakhtakor Tashkent	Tashkent
17:00 UZT (UTC+5)	Rakhmatullaev (yellow card) 20'; Tukhtakhujaev (yellow card) 28' (yellow-red card) 90+4'; Abdullaev (yellow card) 51'; Djabbarov 81'	Report	Klimiashvili (yellow card) 34'; Andreev 52' (pen.); Makharadze (red card) 75'; Suyunov (yellow card) 82'	Stadium: TTYMI Stadium; Attendance: 5,007; Referee: Valentin Kovalenko

6 May 2012 7	Pakhtakor Tashkent	1 – 0	Andijon	Tashkent
18:00 UZT (UTC+5)	Karimov (yellow card) 4'; Krimets 27'; Suyunov (yellow card) 62'	Report	Ghulomkhujaev (yellow card) 45+1'; Ibrohimov (yellow card) 62'; Khujaev (red card) 63'; Abdurahimov (yellow card) 69'	Stadium: Central Stadium; Attendance: 811; Referee: Ilgiz Tantashev

10 May 2012 8	Mash'al Mubarek	0 – 3	Pakhtakor Tashkent	Muborak
17:00 UZT (UTC+5)	Gofurov (yellow card) 82'	Report	Klimiashvili 31'; Suyunov 41'; Abdukholiqov 50'; Krimets (yellow card) 78'	Stadium: Bahrom Vafoev Stadium; Attendance: 4,509; Referee: Ravshan Irmatov

21 May 2012 9	Pakhtakor Tashkent	4 – 0	Qizilqum Zarafshon	Tashkent
18:00 UZT (UTC+5)	Andreev 23'; Abdukholiqov 48'; Makhstaliev 76'; Khashimov 85'	Report	Vasilyev (yellow card) 71'; Samatov (yellow card) 84'	Stadium: Central Stadium; Attendance: 2,103; Referee: Viloyat Najafaliev

11 June 2012 5	Neftchi Fergana	3 – 1	Pakhtakor Tashkent	Fergana
19:00 UZT (UTC+5)	Nasibullaev 57'; Saidov 66' (yellow card) 66'; Berdiev 82' (yellow card) 82'; Pulatov (yellow card) 90+2'	Report	Khashimov 46'; Andreev (yellow card) 76'; Krimets (yellow card) 87'	Stadium: Fargona Stadium; Attendance: 13,058; Referee: Marat Ismailov

16 June 2012 10	Shurtan Guzar	3 – 1	Pakhtakor Tashkent	Gʻuzor
18:30 UZT (UTC+5)	Taran 9' (yellow card) 75'; Krushelnitskiy (yellow card) 30'; Qodirqulov 45' (red card) 61'; Naumov (yellow card) 53'; Ubaydullaev 87'; Rushnitsky (yellow card) 90+2'	Report	Makhstaliev 14' (yellow card) 61'; Kilichev (yellow card) 16'; Klimiashvili (red card) 65'	Stadium: G'uzor Stadium; Attendance: 7,325; Referee: Olim Tolibjonov

21 June 2012 11	Pakhtakor Tashkent	2 – 1	Navbahor Namangan	Tashkent
19:00 UZT (UTC+5)	Kozak 14'; Suyunov (yellow card) 29'; Makharadze 77' (pen.)	Report	Mekhmonov (yellow card) 23'; Pachuyev (yellow card) 26'; Askaraliyev (yellow card) 55'; Sultanov (yellow card) 76'; Boydadaev 90'	Stadium: Central Stadium; Attendance: 2,150; Referee: Zokir Qodirov

26 June 2012 12	Bunyodkor	2 – 0	Pakhtakor Tashkent	Tashkent
19:00 UZT (UTC+5)	Salomov 53'; Kozák 64'; Turaev (yellow card) 89'	Report	Krimets (yellow card) 76'; Kilichev (yellow card) 84'	Stadium: JAR Stadium; Attendance: 7,341; Referee: Ravshan Irmatov

1 July 2012 13	Pakhtakor Tashkent	5 – 0	Metallurg Bekabad	Tashkent
19:00 UZT (UTC+5)	Kozak 13'; Kilichev (yellow card) 34'; Kletskov (yellow card) 40'; Iskanderov 76'; Makhstaliev 83'; Karimov 88'; Abdukholiqov 90+2'	Report	Khoshimov (yellow card) 54'	Stadium: JAR Stadium; Attendance: 2,800; Referee: Marat Ismoilov

4 August 2012 14	Metallurg Bekabad	1 – 2	Pakhtakor Tashkent	Bekabad
18:30 UZT (UTC+5)	Kalević (yellow card) 21'; Karimov 29' (yellow card) 29'	Report	Erkinov 7' (yellow card) 56'; Khashimov (yellow card) 28' (yellow-red card) 90+3'; Karimov 53'; Sharofetdinov (yellow card) 86'	Stadium: Metallurg Bekabad Stadium; Attendance: 10,568; Referee: Sulton Zaylobiddinov

8 August 2012 15	Pakhtakor Tashkent	1 – 1	Bunyodkor	Tashkent
20:00 UZT (UTC+5)	Suyunov (yellow card) 16'; Makharadze (yellow card) 66'; Krimets (yellow card) 68'; Andreev 70'	Report	Salomov 15' (yellow card) 45'; Karimov (yellow card) 67' (yellow-red card) 69'	Stadium: Central Stadium; Attendance: 7,000; Referee: Valentin Kovalenko

18 August 2012 16	Navbahor Namangan	0 – 1	Pakhtakor Tashkent	Namangan
17:00 UZT (UTC+5)	Mekhmonov (yellow card) 20'; Umaraliyev (yellow card) 35'; Makhmudov (yellow card) 85'	Report	Makharadze 35'; Kletskov (yellow card) 39'; Krimets (yellow card) 39'	Stadium: Markaziy Stadium; Attendance: 3,171; Referee: Olim Tolibjonov

27 August 2012 17	Pakhtakor Tashkent	0 – 0	Shurtan Guzar	Tashkent
19:00 UZT (UTC+5)	Krimets (yellow card) 50'	Report	Aliqulov (yellow card) 26'; Tadjiyev (yellow card) 38'	Stadium: Central Stadium; Attendance: 3,983; Referee: Rustam Bobomurodov

3 September 2012 18	Qizilqum Zarafshon	0 – 4	Pakhtakor Tashkent	Zarafshon
16:30 UZT (UTC+5)	Samatov (yellow card) 19'; Djuraev (yellow card) 28'; Iljin (yellow card) 55'	Report	Krimets 13', 20' (yellow card) 71'; Ak.Khalikov 61' (o.g.); Andreev 90+2'	Stadium: Progress Stadium; Attendance: 1,201; Referee: Aziz Osimov

14 September 2012 19	Pakhtakor Tashkent	3 – 0	Mash'al Mubarek	Tashkent
18:30 UZT (UTC+5)	Erkinov 15'; Makharadze 76'; Makhstaliev 87'	Report	Vaniyev (yellow card) 24'; Gofurov (yellow card) 49'; Shodmonova (yellow card) 77'	Stadium: Central Stadium; Attendance: 13,881; Referee: Marat Muhammedov

21 September 2012 20	Andijon	2 – 4	Pakhtakor Tashkent	Andijan
16:00 UZT (UTC+5)	Valizhonov (yellow card) 37' (yellow-red card) 49'; Tukhtasinov (yellow card) 74'; Abdurahimov 76'; Atakhanov 90+2' (pen.)	Report	Abdukholiqov 7', 23', 58'; Ismatullaev (yellow card) 14'; Makharadze (yellow card) 50'; Kozak (yellow card) 77'; Karimov 88'; Lobanov (yellow card) 90+1'	Stadium: Soghlom Avlod Stadium; Attendance: 4,710; Referee: Olim Tolibjonov

27 September 2012 21	Pakhtakor Tashkent	2 – 1	Lokomotiv Tashkent	Tashkent
17:30 UZT (UTC+5)	Andreev 27' (pen.); Kozak (yellow card) 29'; Abdukholiqov 80'	Report	Yuldashov (yellow card) 26'; Tadjiyev 78'	Stadium: Central Stadium; Attendance: 3,483; Referee: Marat Ismoilov

5 October 2012 22	Pakhtakor Tashkent	3 – 0	Neftchi Fergana	Tashkent
17:30 UZT (UTC+5)	Abdukholiqov 4', 57'; Makharadze 12'; Khashimov (yellow card) 44'; Suyunov (yellow card) 68'; Krimets (yellow card) 90+3'	Report	Kholmurodov (yellow card) 14'; Nurboev (yellow card) 40'; Alijonov (yellow card) 53'	Stadium: Central Stadium; Attendance: 8,263; Referee: Aziz Osimov

19 October 2012 23	Nasaf	0 – 2	Pakhtakor Tashkent	Qarshi
17:30 UZT (UTC+5)	Yunusov (yellow card) 79'	Report	Petrović 17' (o.g.); Kozak 23'; Kilichev (yellow card) 32'; Khashimov (yellow card) 65'; Lobanov (yellow card) 80'; Suyunov (yellow card) 88'	Stadium: Markaziy Stadium; Attendance: 5,321; Referee: Ravshan Irmatov

28 October 2012 24	Pakhtakor Tashkent	2 – 0	Dinamo Samarqand	Tashkent
16:00 UZT (UTC+5)	Abdukholiqov 37'; Andreev 73'	Report		Stadium: Central Stadium; Attendance: 3,200; Referee: Zokir Qodirov

17 November 2012 25	Olmaliq	0 – 3	Pakhtakor Tashkent	Olmaliq
14:00 UZT (UTC+5)	Yuldashev (yellow card) 20'; Otakuziev (yellow card) 49'	Report	Abdukholiqov 54'; Karimov 57', 75'; Kletskov (yellow card) 72'	Stadium: Metallurg Stadium; Attendance: 5,745; Referee: Sulton Zaylobiddinov

21 November 2012 26	Pakhtakor Tashkent	4 – 1	Buxoro	Tashkent
14:00 UZT (UTC+5)	Andreev 39' (pen.); Abdukholiqov 65'; Kozak 69', 82'; Krimets (yellow card) 86'	Report	Hasanov 89' (pen.)	Stadium: Central Stadium; Attendance: 9,389; Referee: Valentin Kovalenko

=== Uzbek Cup ===
29 March 2012 Round of 32	Yuzhanin Navoi	1 – 2	Pakhtakor Tashkent	Navoiy
17:30 UZT (UTC+5)	R.Sanaev 9'	Report	Tadjiyev 13'; Sharofetdinov 64' (pen.)	Stadium: Sogdina Stadium; Attendance: 7,223; Referee: M.Muhammedov

25 May 2012 Round of 16 1st Leg	Navbahor Namangan	1 – 2	Pakhtakor Tashkent	Namangan
17:30 UZT (UTC+5)	Pochuev 50'; Toirov (yellow card) 57'; Fomenka (red card) 75'	Report	Abdukholiqov 12'; Karimov 15'; Krimets (yellow card) 53'	Stadium: Markaziy Stadium; Attendance: 5,171; Referee: Marat Ismailov

4 July 2012 Round of 16 2nd Leg	Pakhtakor Tashkent	1 – 1 (3 – 2 agg.)	Navbahor Namangan	Tashkent
19:00 UZT (UTC+5)	Makharadze 16' (yellow card) 35'; Kilichev (yellow card) 43'	Report	Khamidov 63'; Ahmedov (yellow card) 67'	Stadium: Central Stadium; Attendance: 3,051; Referee: Aziz Asymov

8 July 2012 Quarterfinal 1st Leg	Andijon	1 – 2	Pakhtakor Tashkent	Andijan
18:00 UZT (UTC+5)	Rasul Rahmonov 26' (yellow card) 26'; Maqsud Hayitov (yellow card) 57'	Report	Suyunov (yellow card) 24' (goal) 60'; Erkinov 30'; Kilichev (yellow card) 47'	Stadium: Soghlom Avlod Stadium; Attendance: 4,821; Referee: Olim Talibjanov

29 July 2012 Quarterfinal 2nd Leg	Pakhtakor Tashkent	2 – 0 (4 – 1 agg.)	Andijon	Tashkent
18:00 UZT (UTC+5)	Krimets (yellow card) 75'; Abdukholiqov 77'; Andreev 87'	Report	Abdurahimov (yellow card) 51'; Ibrohimov (yellow card) 68'	Stadium: Central Stadium; Attendance: 3,153; Referee: Sherzod Kasymov

22 August 2012 Semifinal 1st Leg	Bunyodkor	1 – 1	Pakhtakor Tashkent	Tashkent
19:00 UZT (UTC+5)	Kozák (yellow card) 16'; Soliev 42'; Gafurov (yellow card) 59'	Report	Kilichev (yellow card) 17'; Andreev 21' (pen.); Kletskov (yellow card) 56'; Karimov (yellow card) 78'	Stadium: JAR Stadium; Attendance: 2,544; Referee: Ravshan Irmatov

24 November 2012 Semifinal 2nd Leg	Pakhtakor Tashkent	1 – 3 (2 – 4 agg.)	Bunyodkor	Tashkent
12:00 UZT (UTC+5)	Sergeyev (yellow card) 52'; Suyunov (yellow card) 64'; Abdukholiqov 73'	Report	Shorakhmedov 53'; Salomov 54', 77'; Murzoev (yellow card) 57'	Stadium: Central Stadium; Attendance: 7,301; Referee: Ravshan Irmatov

=== AFC Champions League ===
==== Group stage ====
Pos	Team	Pld	W	D	L	GF	GA	GD	Pts	Qualification
1	(Saudi Arabia) Al-Ittihad	6	5	1	0	13	4	+9	16	Advance to knockout stage
2	(United Arab Emirates) Baniyas	6	3	2	1	9	2	+7	11	Advance to knockout stage
3	(Uzbekistan) Pakhtakor	6	2	1	3	6	10	−4	7	
4	(Qatar) Al-Arabi	6	0	0	6	4	16	−12	0	

Source: WorldFootball.net

6 March 2012 1	Al-Ittihad (Saudi Arabia)	4–0	(Uzbekistan) Pakhtakor Tashkent	Jeddah, Saudi Arabia
20:35 UTC+03:00	Abdelghani 4'; Abousaban 31', 51'; Kariri (yellow card) 45'; Omar 58'	Report	Kletskov (yellow card) 32' (yellow-red card) 36'; Makharadze (yellow card) 54'; Sharofetdinov (yellow card) 62'	Stadium: Prince Abdullah Al Faisal Stadium; Attendance: 250; Referee: Minoru Tōjō (Japan)

20 March 2012 2	Pakhtakor Tashkent (Uzbekistan)	1–1	(United Arab Emirates) Baniyas	Tashkent, Uzbekistan
17:30 UTC+05:00	Sharofetdinov 29'; Kozak (yellow card) 85'	Report	Jaber (yellow card) 18'; Al Ghaferi (yellow card) 28'; Fawzi 60'; Ali (yellow card) 90+5'	Stadium: JAR Stadium; Attendance: 2,300; Referee: Choi Myung-yong (Korea Republic)

4 April 2012 3	Pakhtakor Tashkent (Uzbekistan)	3–1	(Qatar) Al-Arabi	Tashkent, Uzbekistan
18:00 UTC+05:00	Karimov 9'; Orahovac (yellow card) 47'; Krimets (yellow card) 51'; Sharofetdinov 74'; Abdukholiqov 90+3'	Report	Pisculichi 37'; Siddiq (yellow card) 41'; Marafee (yellow card) 72'; Al Zeyara (yellow card) 81'	Stadium: JAR Stadium; Attendance: 5,532; Referee: Tan Hai (China P.R.)

17 April 2012 4	Al-Arabi (Qatar)	0–1	(Uzbekistan) Pakhtakor Tashkent	Doha, Qatar
19:00 UTC+03:00	Marafee (yellow card) 22'; Al Zeyara (yellow card) 53'; Aghily (yellow card) 73'; Adam (yellow card) 88'	Report	Sharofetdinov (yellow card) 40'; Abdukholiqov 41'; Kilichev (yellow card) 53' (yellow-red card) 75'; Khashimov (yellow card) 90+2'	Stadium: Grand Hamad Stadium; Attendance: 500; Referee: Nawaf Shukralla (Bahrain)

2 May 2012 5	Pakhtakor Tashkent (Uzbekistan)	1–2	(Saudi Arabia) Al-Ittihad	Tashkent, Uzbekistan
18:30 UTC+05:00	Klimiashvili 68' (yellow card) 69'; Krimets (red card) 70'	Report	Hazazi (yellow card) 26' (goal) 60'; Abousaban 90+4' (yellow card) 90+4'	Stadium: JAR Stadium; Attendance: 4,000; Referee: Mohsen Torky (Iran)

16 May 2012 6	Baniyas (United Arab Emirates)	2–0	(Uzbekistan) Pakhtakor Tashkent	Abu Dhabi, United Arab Emirates
19:20 UTC+04:00	Senghor 13'; Abdulrahman 71'	Report		Stadium: Baniyas Stadium; Attendance: 3,927; Referee: Abdul Malik Abdul Bashir (Singapore)

== Squad statistics ==
As of match played 24 November 2012

=== Appearances and goals ===
No.	Pos	Nat	Player	Total		Uzbek League		Uzbek Cup		AFC Champions League	
No.	Pos	Nat	Player	Apps	Goals	Apps	Goals	Apps	Goals	Apps	Goals
2	DF	(Uzbekistan) UZB	Egor Krimets	27	3	23	3	0	0	4	0
5	MF	(Uzbekistan) UZB	Akbar Ismatullaev	15	0	13+2	0	0	0	0	0
6	DF	(Uzbekistan) UZB	Murod Kholmukhamedov	2	0	1	0	0	0	1	0
7	MF	(Georgia (country)) GEO	Kakhi Makharadze	30	4	24	4	0	0	6	0
8	FW	(Montenegro) MNE	Sanibal Orahovac	5	1	2	1	0	0	3	0
9	FW	(Uzbekistan) UZB	Temurkhuja Abdukholiqov	26	15	16+5	13	0	0	4+1	2
12	GK	(Uzbekistan) UZB	Aleksandr Lobanov	20	0	18+1	0	0	0	1	0
13	DF	(Uzbekistan) UZB	Aleksandr Kletskov	16	0	15	0	0	0	1	0
14	MF	(Uzbekistan) UZB	Sherzod Karimov	29	6	18+5	5	0	0	4+2	1
15	MF	(Uzbekistan) UZB	Jamshid Iskanderov	4	1	1+3	1	0	0	0	0
17	MF	(Uzbekistan) UZB	Aram Babayan	3	0	0+3	0	0	0	0	0
19	FW	(Uzbekistan) UZB	Igor Sergeyev	5	0	0+5	0	0	0	0	0
22	FW	(Uzbekistan) UZB	Shakhboz Erkinov	15	2	9+6	2	0	0	0	0
23	FW	(Uzbekistan) UZB	Alisher Azizov	9	0	1+6	0	0	0	0+2	0
24	DF	(Uzbekistan) UZB	Davron Khashimov	26	2	21	2	0	0	5	0
26	MF	(Uzbekistan) UZB	Dilshod Sharofetdinov	25	2	14+6	0	0	0	3+2	2
27	DF	(Uzbekistan) UZB	Ilhom Suyunov	24	1	19+3	1	0	0	2	0
28	MF	(Uzbekistan) UZB	Stanislav Andreev	31	7	24+1	7	0	0	6	0
29	DF	(Uzbekistan) UZB	Vladimir Kozak	25	5	14+5	5	0	0	2+4	0
30	GK	(Uzbekistan) UZB	Temur Juraev	13	0	8	0	0	0	5	0
31	FW	(Uzbekistan) UZB	Timur Khakimov	3	0	0+2	0	0	0	0+1	0
34	MF	(Uzbekistan) UZB	Oybek Kilichev	28	0	20+3	0	0	0	4+1	0
37	MF	(Uzbekistan) UZB	Abdulloh Olimov	1	0	0+1	0	0	0	0	0
38	MF	(Uzbekistan) UZB	Abbosbek Makhstaliev	17	4	5+11	4	0	0	0+1	0
	FW	(Uzbekistan) UZB	Farrukh Shotursunov	1	0	0+1	0	0	0	0	0
Players away on loan:
16	DF	(Uzbekistan) UZB	Akmal Kholmurodov	1	0	1	0	0	0	0	0
21	FW	(Uzbekistan) UZB	Bakhriddin Vakhobov	6	0	2+2	0	0	0	1+1	0
Players who left Pakhtakor Tashkent during the season:
10	FW	(Uzbekistan) UZB	Farhod Tadjiyev	3	0	0+2	0	0	0	1	0
11	MF	(Georgia (country)) GEO	Irakli Klimiashvili	17	2	10+1	1	0	0	6	1
20	MF	(Uzbekistan) UZB	Ildar Magdeev	1	0	0+1	0	0	0	0	0
32	DF	(Uzbekistan) UZB	Aleksey Nikolaev	12	0	7	0	0	0	5	0
33	DF	(Japan) JPN	Naoya Shibamura	2	0	0+1	0	0	0	1	0

=== Goal scorers ===
Place	Position	Nation	Number	Name	Uzbek League	Uzbekistan Cup	AFC Champions League	Total
1	FW	(Uzbekistan)	9	Temurkhuja Abdukholiqov	13	3	2	18
2	MF	(Uzbekistan)	28	Stanislav Andreev	7	2	0	9
3	MF	(Uzbekistan)	14	Sherzod Karimov	5	1	1	7
4	DF	(Uzbekistan)	29	Vladimir Kozak	5	0	0	5
4	MF	(Georgia (country))	7	Kakhi Makharadze	4	1	0	5
6	MF	(Uzbekistan)	38	Abbosbek Makhstaliev	4	0	0	4
7	MF	(Uzbekistan)	2	Egor Krimets	3	0	0	3
7	FW	(Uzbekistan)	22	Shakhboz Erkinov	2	1	0	3
7	MF	(Uzbekistan)	26	Dilshod Sharofetdinov	0	1	2	3
10	DF	(Uzbekistan)	24	Davron Khashimov	2	0	0	2
10	DF	(Uzbekistan)	27	Ilhom Suyunov	1	1	0	2
10	MF	(Georgia (country))	11	Irakli Klimiashvili	1	0	1	2
10				Own goal	2	0	0	2
14	FW	(Montenegro)	8	Sanibal Orahovac	1	0	0	1
14	MF	(Uzbekistan)	15	Jamshid Iskanderov	1	0	0	1
14	FW	(Uzbekistan)	10	Farhod Tadjiyev	0	1	0	1
				TOTALS	51	11	6	68

=== Clean sheets ===
Place	Position	Nation	Number	Name	Uzbek League	Uzbekistan Cup	AFC Champions League	Total
1	GK	(Uzbekistan)	12	Aleksandr Lobanov	13	0	0	13
2	GK	(Uzbekistan)	35	Temur Juraev	3	1	1	5
				TOTALS	16	1	1	18

=== Disciplinary record ===
Number	Nation	Position	Name	Uzbek League		Uzbekistan Cup		AFC Champions League		Total	
Number	Nation	Position	Name	Booked	Sent off (straight red)	Booked	Sent off (straight red)	Booked	Sent off (straight red)	Booked	Sent off (straight red)
2	(Uzbekistan)	DF	Egor Krimets	10	0	0	0	1	1	11	1
5	(Uzbekistan)	MF	Akbar Ismatullaev	1	0	0	0	0	0	1	0
7	(Georgia (country))	MF	Kakhi Makharadze	3	1	0	0	1	0	4	1
8	(Montenegro)	FW	Sanibal Orahovac	0	0	0	0	1	0	1	0
12	(Uzbekistan)	GK	Aleksandr Lobanov	2	0	0	0	0	0	2	0
13	(Uzbekistan)	MF	Aleksandr Kletskov	3	0	0	0	2	1	5	1
14	(Uzbekistan)	MF	Sherzod Karimov	1	0	0	0	0	0	1	0
22	(Uzbekistan)	FW	Shakhboz Erkinov	1	0	0	0	0	0	1	0
24	(Uzbekistan)	DF	Davron Khashimov	4	1	0	0	1	0	5	1
26	(Uzbekistan)	MF	Dilshod Sharofetdinov	1	0	0	0	2	0	3	0
27	(Uzbekistan)	DF	Ilhom Suyunov	6	0	0	0	0	0	6	0
28	(Uzbekistan)	MF	Stanislav Andreev	1	0	0	0	0	0	1	0
29	(Uzbekistan)	DF	Vladimir Kozak	2	0	0	0	1	0	3	0
30	(Uzbekistan)	GK	Temur Juraev	1	0	0	0	0	0	1	0
34	(Uzbekistan)	MF	Oybek Kilichev	4	0	0	0	2	1	6	1
38	(Uzbekistan)	MF	Abbosbek Makhstaliev	1	0	0	0	0	0	1	0
Players away from Pakhtakor Tashkent on loan :
Players who left Pakhtakor Tashkent during the season:
11	(Georgia (country))	MF	Irakli Klimiashvili	2	1	0	0	1	0	3	1
			TOTALS	43	3	0	0	12	3	55	6
