= 2012 Uzbek League =

Uzbek League
- Season: 2012
- Dates: 15 March – 21 November
- Champions: Pakhtakor; 9th title
- Relegated: FK Andijan; Mash'al
- Champions League: Pakhtakor; Bunyodkor; Lokomotiv Tashkent
- Matches: 182
- Goals: 458 (2.52 per match)
- Top goalscorer: Anvar Berdiev; 16 goals
- Biggest home win: Shurtan Guzar - FK Andijan - 6:1
- Biggest away win: FK Buxoro - Bunyodkor - 0:4; Qizilqum Zarafshon - Pakhtakor - 0:4

The 2012 Uzbek League season was the 21st season of top level football in Uzbekistan since independence in 1992. Bunyodkor were the defending champions from the 2011 campaign. The draw for the 2012 Uzbek League season took place on January 6, 2012.

FK Guliston was officially out of the season, and was replaced by Qizilqum Zarafshon, the reason for absence were financial problems of the club.

== New rules ==
- The 4+1 format of foreign players has been reduced to 3+1.

== Teams ==
Qizilqum Zarafshon and Sogdiana Jizzakh were relegated in the last edition of the Uzbek League to First League.

Locations of the 2012 Uzbek League Teams

Club	Coach	City	Stadium	Capacity	2011
FK Andijan	(Uzbekistan) Azamat Abduraimov	Andijan	Soghlom Avlod Stadium	18,360	12th
Bunyodkor	(Uzbekistan) Mirjalol Qosimov	Tashkent	JAR Stadium	8,460	Champions
FK Bukhoro	(Turkmenistan) Tachmurad Agamuradov	Bukhoro	Buxoro Arena	22,700	9th
Lokomotiv Tashkent	(Uzbekistan) Ravshan Muqimov	Tashkent	Lokomotiv Stadium	8,000	D1, 1st
Mash'al Mubarek	(Kazakhstan) Vladimir Fomichev	Muborak	Bahrom Vafoev Stadium	10,000	5th
Metallurg Bekabad	(Uzbekistan) Rustam Mirsodiqov	Bekabad	Metallurg Bekabad Stadium	11,000	8th
Nasaf Qarshi	(Uzbekistan) Usmon Toshev	Qarshi	Qarshi Stadium	14,750	2nd
Navbahor Namangan	(Uzbekistan) Mustafo Bayramov	Namangan	Markaziy Stadium	28,462	6th
Neftchi Farg'ona	(Uzbekistan) Yuriy Sarkisyan	Farghona	Farghona Stadium	14,520	4th
Olmaliq FK	(Uzbekistan) Igor Shkvyrin	Olmaliq	Metallurg Stadium	11,000	11th
Pakhtakor	(Uzbekistan) Murod Ismailov	Tashkent	Pakhtakor Stadium	35,000	3rd
Qizilqum Zarafshon	(Uzbekistan) Ravshan Khaydarov	Zarafshon	Progress Stadium	6,000	13th
Dinamo	(Uzbekistan) Akhmad Ubaydullaev	Samarqand	Olimpiya Stadium	12,250	10th
Sho'rtan Ghuzor	(Germany) Edgar Gess	Ghuzor	Ghuzor Stadium	7,000	7th

=== Managerial changes ===
Team	Outgoing manager	Manner of departure	Replaced by	Position in table	Date of appointment
FK Andijan	(Uzbekistan) Orif Mamatkazin	Resigned	(Russia) Aleksandr Averyanov	Pre-season	December 12, 2011
FK Andijan	(Russia) Aleksandr Averyanov	Sacked	(Uzbekistan) Azamat Abduraimov	Season	August 22, 2012
FK Buxoro	(Uzbekistan) Gennadiy Kochnev	Sacked	(Uzbekistan) Jamshid Saidov	Pre-season	December 24, 2011
FK Buxoro	(Uzbekistan) Jamshid Saidov	Sacked	(Turkmenistan) Tachmurad Agamuradov	Season	June 2, 2012
Lokomotiv Tashkent	(Uzbekistan) Ravshan Muqimov	Resigned	(Armenia) Khoren Hovhannisyan	Pre-season	December 12, 2011
Lokomotiv Tashkent	(Armenia) Khoren Hovhannisyan	End of contract	(Uzbekistan) Ravshan Muqimov	Season	June 12, 2012
Nasaf Qarshi	(Ukraine) Anatoliy Demyanenko	Signed by Volyn Lutsk	(Uzbekistan) Ruziqul Berdiev	Pre-season	January 5, 2012
Nasaf Qarshi	(Uzbekistan) Ruziqul Berdiev	Sacked	(Uzbekistan) Usmon Toshev	Season	May 23, 2012
Pakhtakor	(Uzbekistan) Murod Ismailov	Temporary position over	(Serbia) Dejan Đurđević	Pre-season	December 28, 2011
Pakhtakor	(Serbia) Dejan Đurđević	Mutual agreement	(Uzbekistan) Murod Ismailov	Season	June 19, 2012
Shurtan Guzar	(Turkmenistan) Tachmurad Agamuradov	Sacked	(Belarus) Igor Kriushenko	Pre-season	November 22, 2011
Shurtan Guzar	(Belarus) Igor Kriushenko	Sacked	(Germany) Edgar Gess	Season	July 5, 2012
Qizilqum Zarafshon	(Uzbekistan) Sergei Arslanov	Temporary position over	(Uzbekistan) Ravshan Khaydarov	Pre-season	January 8, 2012

== Foreign players ==
Club	Player 1	Player 2	Player 3	Asian player	Former players*
FK Andijan	(Georgia (country)) Mikheil Alavidze	(Georgia (country)) Levan Mdivnishvili	(Lithuania) Tadas Gražiūnas	(Tajikistan) Muiddin Mamazulunov	(Belarus) Aleksandr Petukhov (Ukraine) Oleksandr Polovkov (Russia) Vladimir Shishelov (Tajikistan) Farkhod Tokhirov
Bunyodkor	(Serbia) Slavoljub Đorđević	(Slovakia) Ján Kozák			(Kyrgyzstan) Emil Kenzhesariev (Australia) David Carney
FK Buxoro	(Georgia (country)) Giorgi Kvesieshvili	(Japan) Naoya Shibamura	(Nigeria) David Oniya	(Turkmenistan) Amir Gurbani	(Georgia (country)) Mikheil Kakaladze (Ukraine) Oleksandr Tarasenko
Lokomotiv Tashkent	(Armenia) Zhora Hovhannisyan	(Armenia) Romik Khachatryan	(Lithuania) Arturas Fomenka	(Turkmenistan) Maksim Kazankov	(France) Mohammad Bindi Mustaffa
Mash'al Mubarek	(Serbia) Igor Petković	(Serbia) Milorad Resanovic		(Turkmenistan) Alik Khaydarov	(Finland) Toni Lindberg (Kazakhstan) Ilya Fomitchev
Metallurg Bekabad	(Montenegro) Bojan Kaljević	(Ukraine) Andriy Sirotyuk			
Nasaf Qarshi	(Latvia) Andrejs Perepļotkins	(Montenegro) Ivan Bošković	(Russia) Vladimir Shishelov	(Turkmenistan) Artur Gevorkyan	(Serbia) Bojan Mališić
Navbahor Namangan	(Belarus) Vital Panasyuk	(Belarus) Nikolay Ryndzyuk	(Moldova) Denis Romanenco	(Turkmenistan) Maksim Belyh	(Lithuania) Arturas Fomenka (Russia) Vladimir Chekunov
Neftchi Farg'ona					
Olmaliq FK	(Russia) Evgeniy Gogol	(Russia) Artem Nikitenko	(Serbia) Darko Stanojević	(Turkmenistan) Pavel Kharchik	
Pakhtakor Tashkent	(Georgia (country)) Kakhi Makharadze	(Montenegro) Sanibal Orahovac			(Georgia (country)) Irakli Klimiashvili (Japan) Naoya Shibamura
Qizilqum Zarafshon	(Lithuania) Pavelas Leusas	(Russia) Yuriy Usachov			
FK Samarqand-Dinamo	(Ukraine) Andrei Melnichuk	(Ukraine) Andrei Erokhin	(Lithuania) Egidijus Majus		
Shurtan Guzar	(Georgia (country)) Giorgi Megreladze	(Nigeria) Patrick Agbo	(Ivory Coast) Adama Soro		(Belarus) Vitaly Rushnitsky (Tajikistan) Muiddin Mamazulunov

- Foreign players who left their clubs after first half of the season.

== League table ==
Pos	Team	Pld	W	D	L	GF	GA	GD	Pts	Qualification or relegation
1	Pakhtakor Tashkent (Q, C)	26	18	5	3	51	16	+35	59	2013 AFC Champions League Group stage (Note: Lokomotive Tashkent qualified due to Bunyodkor also winning the 2012 Uzbekistan Cup.)
2	Bunyodkor (Q)	26	17	6	3	42	16	+26	57	2013 AFC Champions League Group stage
3	Lokomotiv Tashkent (Q)	26	14	7	5	43	22	+21	49	2013 AFC Champions League Qualifying play-off
4	Nasaf Qarshi	26	14	7	5	37	20	+17	49	
5	Shurtan Guzar	26	12	4	10	38	33	+5	40	
6	Neftchi Farg'ona	26	10	7	9	36	29	+7	37	
7	FK Buxoro	26	10	5	11	24	31	−7	35	
8	Olmaliq FK	26	9	4	13	39	46	−7	31	
9	FK Samarqand-Dinamo	26	9	2	15	27	29	−2	29	
10	Metallurg Bekabad	26	8	5	13	32	46	−14	29	
11	Qizilqum Zarafshon	26	6	9	11	22	41	−19	27	
12	Navbahor Namangan	26	6	8	12	19	34	−15	26	
13	Mash'al Mubarek (R)	26	6	5	15	20	43	−23	23	Relegation to Lower Division
14	FK Andijan (R)	26	4	4	18	28	52	−24	16	Relegation to Lower Division

Updated to match(es) played on 21 November 2012. Source: Uzbekistan Professional Football League
Rules for classification: 1) points; 2) goal difference; 3) number of goals scored.
(C) Champions; (Q) Qualified for the phase indicated; (R) Relegated

== Results ==
Home \ Away	AND	BUN	FJB	QIZ	LOK	MAS	MET	NAS	NAV	NEF	OTM	PAK	SAM	SHU
FK Andijan		0–2	1–2	5–1	0–1	4–0	3–3	3–4	0–1	1–0	1–4	2–4	0–3	1–2
Bunyodkor	0–0		1–0	3–0	1–1	1–0	3–1	0–0	1–0	2–1	2–0	2–0	2–1	3–0
FJ Buxoro	1–0	0–4		1–0	1–1	1–1	2–0	1–0	2–1	1–1	0–1	0–1	2–0	0–1
Qizilqum Zarafshon	1–2	2–2	1–0		1–1	1–1	0–0	1–1	1–1	2–1	2–1	0–4	1–1	2–0
Lokomotiv Tashkent	1–1	3–1	2–1	0–1		1–0	5–1	0–1	3–0	1–1	4–2	1–1	3–1	4–1
Mash'al Mubarek	1–0	0–2	1–1	0–2	1–2		2–1	0–0	2–0	3–0	2–1	0–3	2–0	1–3
Metallurg Bekabad	1–1	1–3	2–0	1–0	0–1	2–1		1–0	0–0	1–1	4–3	1–2	2–1	4–0
Nasaf Qarshi	4–0	0–0	3–0	2–0	0–2	3–0	1–0		1–1	1–2	4–2	0–2	2–1	2–1
Navbahor Namangan	1–0	2–1	1–1	0–0	0–2	2–2	1–0	1–2		1–0	3–1	0–1	1–1	1–1
Neftchi Farg'ona	2–0	1–2	3–1	3–1	1–1	3–0	4–0	0–0	3–0		4–2	3–1	1–0	1–1
Olmaliq FK	3–2	2–1	1–3	2–2	1–0	4–0	3–2	0–1	1–0	0–0		0–3	1–2	2–3
Pakhtakor Tashkent	1–0	1–1	4–1	4–0	2–1	3–0	5–0	0–0	2–1	3–0	0–0		2–0	0–0
FK Samarqand-Dinamo	3–0	0–1	0–1	3–0	0–1	2–0	3–2	0–2	2–0	2–0	0–1	0–1		1–0
Shurtan Guzar	6–1	0–1	0–1	2–0	2–1	1–0	1–2	2–3	4–0	2–0	1–1	3–1	1–0	

Source: Soccerway
Legend: Blue = home team win; Yellow = draw; Red = away team win.

== Top goalscorers ==
See also Coach and Player of Month

#	Scorer	Club	Goals (Pen.)
1	(Uzbekistan) Anvar Berdiev	Neftchi Farg'ona	19 (5)
2	(Uzbekistan) Igor Taran	Shurtan Guzar	14 (2)
3	(Uzbekistan) Temurkhuja Abdukholiqov	Pakhtakor	13 (0)
3	(Uzbekistan) Vladimir Shishelov	Andijan/Nasaf Qarshi	13 (3)
5	(Uzbekistan) Ruzimboy Ahmedov	FK Dinamo Samarqand	11 (1)
5	(Uzbekistan) Zaynitdin Tadjiyev	Lokomotiv Tashkent	11 (3)
7	(Lithuania) Arturas Fomenka	Lokomotiv Tashkent	9 (0)
7	(Turkmenistan) Artur Gevorkyan	Nasaf Qarshi	9 (0)
7	(Uzbekistan) Zokhid Abdullaev	Metallurg Bekabad	9 (0)
10	(Uzbekistan) Shahzodbek Nurmatov	Metallurg Bekabad	8 (0)

Last updated: 21 November 2012
Source: Soccerway

== See also ==
- Uzbekistan Footballer of the Year
- Uzbek League Top Scorer
