= Irina Bogushevskaya =

Russian singer (born 1965)

Irina Bogushevskaya Ири́на Алекса́ндровна Богуше́вская
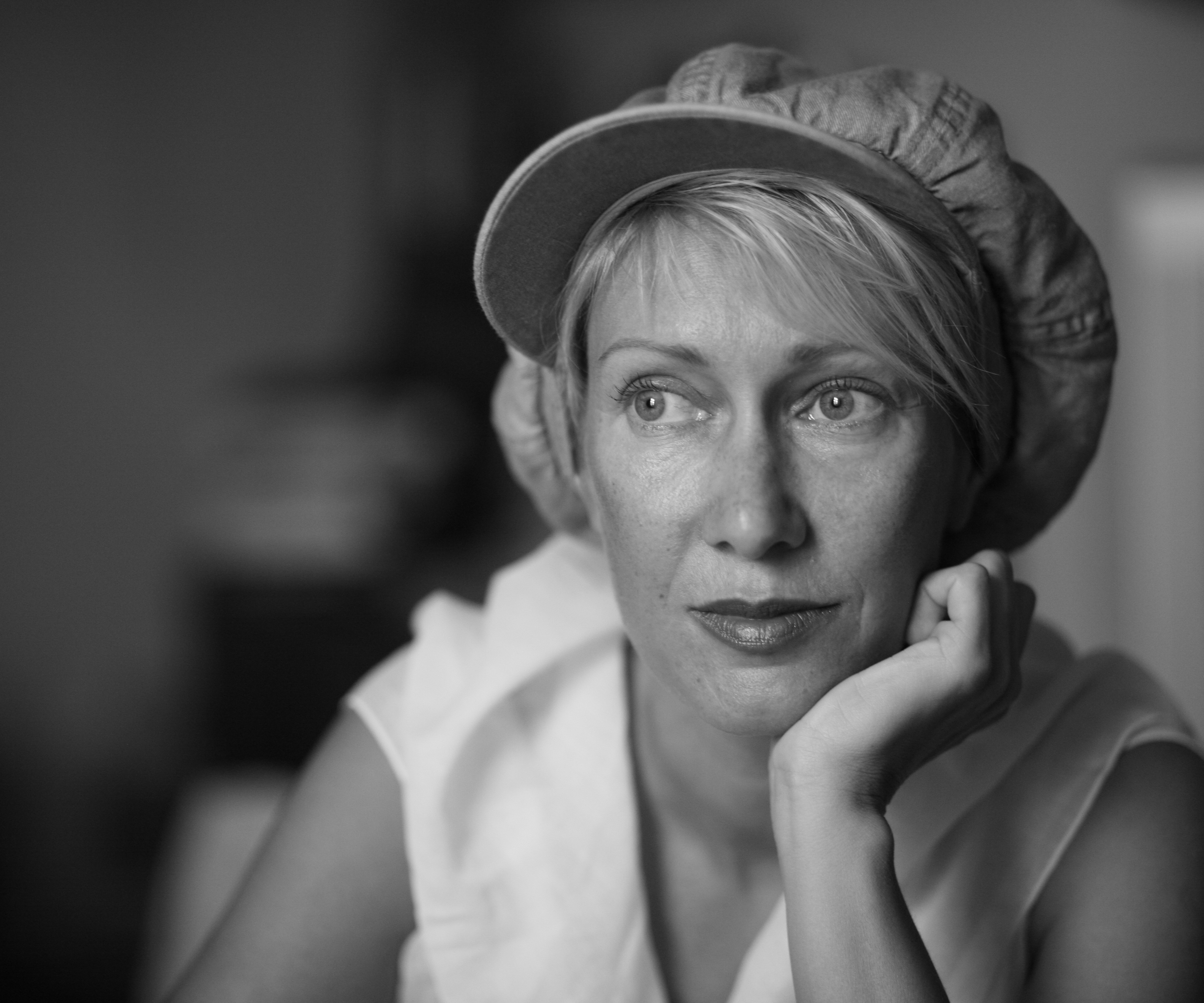
- in 2008

Background information
- Born: November 2, 1965 (age 60)
- Genres: Pop, jazz, cabaret rock, russian chanson
- Occupation: Singer

Irina Bogushevskaya (Russian: Ири́на Алекса́ндровна Богуше́вская, IPA: [ɪˈrʲinə ɐlʲɪˈksandrəvnə bəɡʊˈʂɛfskəjə]; born 2 November 1965) is a Russian singer, poet, and composer of theater jazz and cabaret rock. Her largest event was a one-woman concert at the Kremlin Palace in 2005, which drew 6,000 people.

== Discography ==
- Kniga Pesen (Книга песен, Book of Songs), 1998
- Brazilsky Kreyser (Бразильский крейсер, Brazil Cruiser), 2000
- Legkiye Lyudi (Легкие люди, Easy People), 2001
- Shou dly Tebya Odnoy (Шоу для тебя одной, Show for You Alone) - live concert, 2003
- Nezhnye Veshchi (Нежные вещи, Gentle Things), 2004
- Shyolk (Шёлк, Silk), 2010
- Detskaya Ploshchadka nomer 1 (Детская площадка № 1, Playground No 1) with Andrei Usachyov and Aleksandr Pinegin, 2011
- Detskaya Ploshchadka nomer 2 (Детская площадка № 2, Playground No 2) with Andrei Usachyov and Aleksandr Pinegin, 2014
- Kukly (Куклы, Puppets), 2015
