= 2012 in Uzbekistani football =

2012 in Uzbekistani Football involves the national competitions of the Uzbekistani football league system and the national team.

== Domestic leagues ==
=== Promotion and relegation ===
Relegated from Uzbek League

Sogdiana Jizzakh

Promoted to Uzbek League

Lokomotiv Tashkent

=== Uzbek League ===
Pos	Team	Pld	W	D	L	GF	GA	GD	Pts	Qualification or relegation
1	Pakhtakor Tashkent (Q, C)	26	18	5	3	51	16	+35	59	2013 AFC Champions League Group stage (Note: Lokomotive Tashkent qualified due to Bunyodkor also winning the 2012 Uzbekistan Cup.)
2	Bunyodkor (Q)	26	17	6	3	42	16	+26	57	2013 AFC Champions League Group stage
3	Lokomotiv Tashkent (Q)	26	14	7	5	43	22	+21	49	2013 AFC Champions League Qualifying play-off
4	Nasaf Qarshi	26	14	7	5	37	20	+17	49	
5	Shurtan Guzar	26	12	4	10	38	33	+5	40	
6	Neftchi Farg'ona	26	10	7	9	36	29	+7	37	
7	FK Buxoro	26	10	5	11	24	31	−7	35	
8	Olmaliq FK	26	9	4	13	39	46	−7	31	
9	FK Samarqand-Dinamo	26	9	2	15	27	29	−2	29	
10	Metallurg Bekabad	26	8	5	13	32	46	−14	29	
11	Qizilqum Zarafshon	26	6	9	11	22	41	−19	27	
12	Navbahor Namangan	26	6	8	12	19	34	−15	26	
13	Mash'al Mubarek (R)	26	6	5	15	20	43	−23	23	Relegation to Lower Division
14	FK Andijan (R)	26	4	4	18	28	52	−24	16	Relegation to Lower Division

Updated to match(es) played on 21 November 2012. Source: Uzbekistan Professional Football League
Rules for classification: 1) points; 2) goal difference; 3) number of goals scored.
(C) Champions; (Q) Qualified for the phase indicated; (R) Relegated

== Awards ==
=== Coach and Player of Month ===
Coach of Month and Player of Month monthly awards given to Best Performed Coach and Player of Month and organised by UFF after mass-media sport journalists survey.

Month	Uzbekistan Football Federation Awards			
Month	Coach	Team	Player	Team
January	(Uzbekistan) Vadim Abramov	Uzbekistan	(Uzbekistan) Kenja Turaev	(Uzbekistan) Nasaf Qarshi
February	(Uzbekistan) Vadim Abramov	Uzbekistan	(Uzbekistan) Oybek Qilichev	(Uzbekistan) FK Andijan
March	(Uzbekistan) Mirjalol Qosimov	(Uzbekistan) Bunyodkor	(Uzbekistan) Odil Ahmedov	(Russia) Anzhi Machachkala
April	(Uzbekistan) Mirjalol Qosimov	(Uzbekistan) Bunyodkor	(Uzbekistan) Odil Ahmedov	(Russia) Anzhi Machachkala
May	(Uzbekistan) Mirjalol Qosimov	(Uzbekistan) Bunyodkor	(Uzbekistan) Ignatiy Nesterov	(Uzbekistan) Bunyodkor
June	(Uzbekistan) Mirjalol Qosimov	Bunyodkor/Uzbekistan	(Uzbekistan) Shavkat Salomov	(Uzbekistan) Bunyodkor
July	(Turkmenistan) Tachmurad Agamuradov	(Uzbekistan) FK Buxoro	(Uzbekistan) Odil Ahmedov	(Russia) Anzhi Machachkala
August	(Germany) Edgar Gess	(Uzbekistan) Shurtan Guzar	(Uzbekistan) Igor Taran	(Uzbekistan) Shurtan Guzar
September	(Uzbekistan) Mirjalol Qosimov	Bunyodkor/Uzbekistan	(Uzbekistan) Jasur Hasanov	(Uzbekistan) Bunyodkor
October	(Uzbekistan) Dilshod Nuraliev	Uzbekistan U-16	(Uzbekistan) Sanjar Tursunov	(Russia) Alania Vladikavkaz
November	(Uzbekistan) Mirjalol Qosimov	Bunyodkor/Uzbekistan	(Uzbekistan) Igor Sergeev	Pakhtakor/Uzbekistan U-19
December	(Uzbekistan) Bakhtiyor Toghaev	(Uzbekistan) Ardus Tashkent futsal club	(Uzbekistan) Odil Ahmedov	(Russia) Anzhi Machachkala
