= Oybek Kilichev =

Uzbek footballer

Personal information
- Full name: Oybek Sakai Kilichev
- Date of birth: 17 January 1989 (age 37)
- Place of birth: Tashkent, Uzbekistan
- Height: 1.75 m (5 ft 9 in)
- Position: Midfielder

Youth career
- 2007: Traktor Tashkent
- 2008–2009: Pakhtakor

Senior career*
Years	Team	Apps	(Gls)
2010	Pakhtakor	2	(0)
2011	Andijan	18	(2)
2012–2014	Pakhtakor	55	(5)
2014	→ Al-Shaab (loan)	11	(1)
2015	Paykan	12	(0)
2016	Pakhtakor	6	(0)
2016	Perak FA	9	(0)
2017	Navbahor Namangan	22	(2)
2018	AGMK	11	(0)
2019	Andijan	17	(2)
2020	Lokomotiv Tashkent	5	(0)
2020–2021	Qizilqum Zarafshon	9	(2)

International career
2009	Uzbekistan U20	2	(0)
2012	Uzbekistan	3	(0)
- * Club domestic league appearances and goals as of 23:41, 19 December 2020 (UTC)

Oybek Kilichev (born 17 January 1989) is an Uzbek footballer.

== Club career ==
Born in Tashkent, he started his youth career with Traktor Tashkent in 2007 before joining FK Pakhtakor in 2008. In 2010, after being promoted to the first team, he made 2 appearances for the club. In order to get more first team appearances he tried his luck with FK Andijan. The following year saw him returning to his former club. In January 2014, he signed for Al-Shaab of UAE Pro League.

On 20 January 2015, Kilichev moved to Persian Gulf Pro League side Paykan F.C. on a free transfer, signing an 18-month contract. Kilichev signed with his current club, FK Pakhtakor on 15 January 2016. He signed with Perak FA in June 2016.

== Honours ==
- FK Pakhtakor

Uzbek League (1): 2012
