= Kletskov =

Kletskov (masculine, Russian: Клецков) or Kletskova (feminine, Russian: Клецкова) is a Russian surname. Notable people with the surname include:

- Aleksandr Kletskov (born 1985), Uzbekistani soccer player
- Natalia Kletskova, Russian paralympic athlete
