= Ilya Fomichev =

Kazakhstani professional footballer

Personal information
- Full name: Ilya Vladimirovich Fomichev
- Date of birth: 14 August 1982 (age 44)
- Place of birth: Almaty, Kazakh SSR, Soviet Union
- Height: 1.94 m (6 ft 4 1/2 in)
- Position: Defender

Team information
- Current team: FC Vostok
- Number: 4

Senior career*
Years	Team	Apps	(Gls)
2004	TP-47	46	(0)
2005	Okzhetpes	28	(0)
2006–2007	AC Oulu	42	(0)
2008	TP-47	22	(0)
2009	Taraz	24	(0)
2010	Zhetysu	21	(0)
2011	AC Oulu	17	(0)
2012	Mash'al Mubarek	25	(0)
2013	Vostok	8	(0)
- * Club domestic league appearances and goals as of 13 May 2013

Ilya Vladimirovich Fomichev (Russian: Илья Владимирович Фомичёв, also Fomichyov) (born 14 August 1982) is a Kazakhstani professional footballer who played for FC Vostok.

He also played for the Finnish club AC Oulu.

== Career statistics ==
Appearances and goals by club, season and competition
Club	Season	League			National cup (Note: Includes Kazakhstan Cup and Suomen Cup)		Total	
Club	Season	Division	Apps	Goals	Apps	Goals	Apps	Goals
Caspiy Aktau	2001	Kazakhstan Premier League	18	0	–		18	0
Zhenis	2002	Kazakhstan Premier League	7	0	2	0	9	0
Ekibastuzets	2003	Kazakhstan Premier League	10	0	–		10	0
TP-47	2004	Veikkausliiga	22	0	0	0	22	0
Okzhetpes	2005	Kazakhstan Premier League	28	0	2	0	30	0
AC Oulu	2006	Ykkönen	20	0	0	0	20	0
AC Oulu	2007	Veikkausliiga	22	0	0	0	22	0
AC Oulu	Total		42	0	0	0	42	0
TP-47	2008	Ykkönen	23	0	1	0	24	0
Taraz	2009	Kazakhstan Premier League	24	0	5	0	29	0
Zhetysu	2010	Kazakhstan Premier League	21	0	4	0	25	0
AC Oulu	2011	Ykkönen	17	0	0	0	17	0
Mash'al Mubarek	2012	Uzbekistan Super League	25	0	0	0	25	0
Vostok	2013	Kazakhstan Premier League	8	0	0	0	8	0
Career total			235	0	14	0	249	0
