= Toni Lindberg =

Finnish footballer (born 1985)

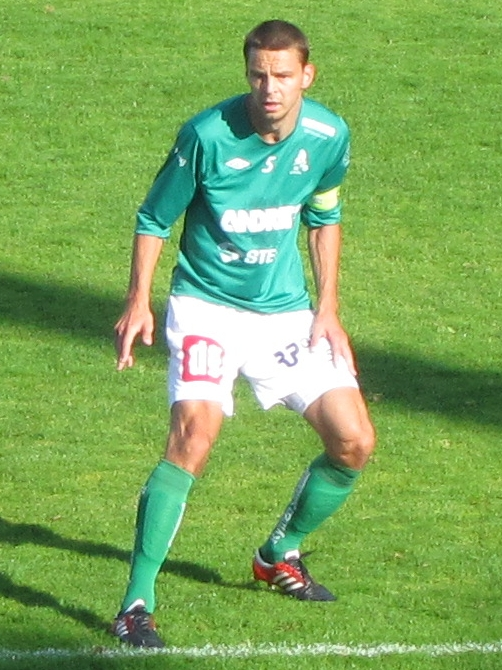
- Lindberg with KooTeePee in 2013.

Personal information
- Date of birth: 23 September 1985 (age 41)
- Place of birth: Ruotsinpyhtää, Finland
- Height: 1.88 m (6 ft 2 in)
- Position: Defender

Youth career
- MYPA

Senior career*
Years	Team	Apps	(Gls)
2002–2003	Villisiat		
2004–2005	Valkealan Kajo	25	(0)
2006–2007	Kuusankoski	44	(4)
2008–2011	MYPA	80	(7)
2012	Mash'al Mubarek	9	(0)
2012	Alta	11	(0)
2013	KooTeePee	27	(0)
2014	MYPA	15	(1)
2015	Sudet	7	(0)

Managerial career
- 2016–2017: Sudet (assistant)
- 2017–2018: Sudet
- 2019: Lahti (youth coach)
- 2020–2023: Lahti (assistant)
- 2023–2024: Lahti
- * Club domestic league appearances and goals as of 27 November 2023

Toni Lindberg (born 23 September 1985) is a Finnish football manager and former professional football player.

== Playing career ==
As a player, Lindberg started his senior career in 2002 with Elimäen Villisiat in the sixth-tier Vitonen. He has played in his native Finland also for Valkealan Kajo, FC Kuusankoski in lower divisions and for MyPa in top-tier Veikkausliiga, before joining Mash'al Mubarek in Uzbekistan Super League in January 2012. He has also played for Alta IF in the second-tier in Norway.

== Coaching career ==
After his playing career, Lindberg has been a youth and assistant coach of Sudet and FC Lahti. On 31 August 2023, he was named the manager of Lahti in Veikkausliiga, after sacking of Mikko Mannila. Lindberg was fired on 20 June 2024.

== Career statistics ==
As of 7 May 2024

Appearances and goals by club, season and competition
Club	Season	League			Domestic Cups (Note: Includes Suomen Cup and Finnish League Cup)		Europe		Total	
Club	Season	Division	Apps	Goals	Apps	Goals	Apps	Goals	Apps	Goals
Kuusankoski	2006	Kakkonen								
Kuusankoski	2007	Kakkonen								
Kuusankoski	Total		44	4	0	0	0	0	44	4
MyPa	2008	Veikkausliiga	6	1	–		–		6	1
MyPa	2009	Veikkausliiga	17	2	4	0	–		21	2
MyPa	2010	Veikkausliiga	24	3	1	0	4 (Note: Includes UEFA Europa League)	0	29	3
MyPa	2011	Veikkausliiga	33	1	2	0	–		35	1
MyPa	Total		80	7	7	0	4	0	91	7
Mash'al Mubarek	2012	Uzbekistan Super League	9	0	0	0	–		9	0
Alta	2012	1. divisjon	11	0	–		–		11	0
KooTeePee	2013	Ykkönen	27	1	4	0	–		31	1
MyPa	2014	Veikkausliiga	15	1	3	0	0	0	18	1
Sudet	2015	Kakkonen	7	0	–		–		7	0
Career total			194	13	12	0	4	0	210	13
