= Tadas Gražiūnas =

Lithuanian footballer (born 1978)

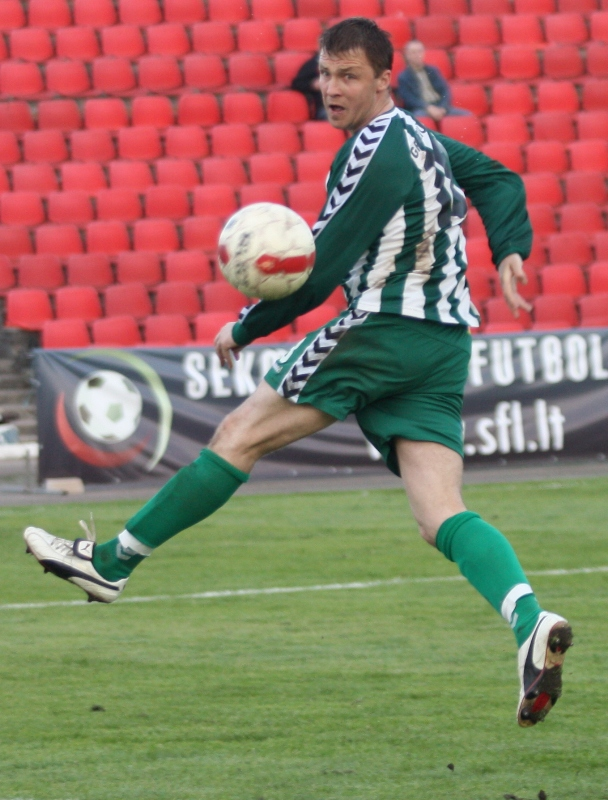

Personal information
- Date of birth: 18 April 1978 (age 48)
- Place of birth: Vilnius, Lithuanian SSR
- Height: 1.92 m (6 ft 3 1/2 in)
- Position: Defender

Senior career*
Years	Team	Apps	(Gls)
1995	Alsa Vilnius	13	(0)
1996–1997	Panerys Vilnius	52	(3)
1998–1999	Kareda Šiauliai	46	(4)
2000–2001	Rostselmash Rostov-on-Don	26	(1)
2001	Torpedo-ZIL Moscow	4	(0)
2002	Atlantas Klaipėda	4	(0)
2002	Dinamo Minsk	5	(0)
2003	Volgar-Gazprom Astrakhan	33	(1)
2004–2006	Žalgiris Vilnius	68	(5)
2007	FC Vilnius	5	(0)
2008	Vindava Ventspils	14	(0)
2009–2010	Žalgiris Vilnius	10	(1)
2010	Tauras Tauragė	14	(1)
2011	Buxoro	25	(2)
2012	Andijon	6	(0)

International career
1997–1998	Lithuania	11	(0)
- * Club domestic league appearances and goals

Tadas Gražiūnas (born 18 April 1978) is a retired Lithuanian professional footballer. He made his professional debut in the A Lyga in 1995 for JR Alsa Vilnius. He played 2 games in the UEFA Intertoto Cup 2000 for FC Rostselmash Rostov-on-Don.

== Honours ==
- Lithuanian A Lyga champion: 1998.
- A Lyga runner-up: 1999.

National Team

- Baltic Cup
  - 2005
