= Taïna Adama Soro =

Ivorian footballer

Personal information
- Full name: Taïna Adama Soro
- Date of birth: 20 December 1981 (age 44)
- Place of birth: Sojefia, Ivory Coast
- Height: 1.81 m (5 ft 11 in)
- Position: Midfielder

Youth career
- Racing Club d'Abobo
- Académie de Sol Beni

Senior career*
Years	Team	Apps	(Gls)
2002–2004	Sabé Sports de Bouna		
2004–2005	ASEC Mimosas		
2006–2008	MTZ-RIPO Minsk	41	(5)
2009–2011	Minsk	84	(6)
2012	Shurtan Guzar	25	(1)
2013–2014	Shakhtyor Soligorsk	31	(2)
2015	Neman Grodno	13	(1)
- * Club domestic league appearances and goals as of 31 December 2015

Taïna Adama Soro (born 20 December 1981) is an Ivorian former footballer whose preferred position was a midfielder.

== Career ==
Soro began his career in Racing Club d'Abobo before joining Académie de Sol Beni in 2001. He played for one year in the youth team from ASEC Mimosas before being transferred to Sabé Sports de Bouna. At Bouna he played 24 games and scored 7 goals, after which he was called back to ASEC, where he played in CAF Champions League in 2004. In January 2006 he joined Belarusian team MTZ-RIPO Minsk. He played 111 games and scores 22 goals for the club and was transferred to FC Minsk in December 2008.

His latest club was Neman Grodno in 2015.
