= Pavelas Leusas =

Lithuanian footballer

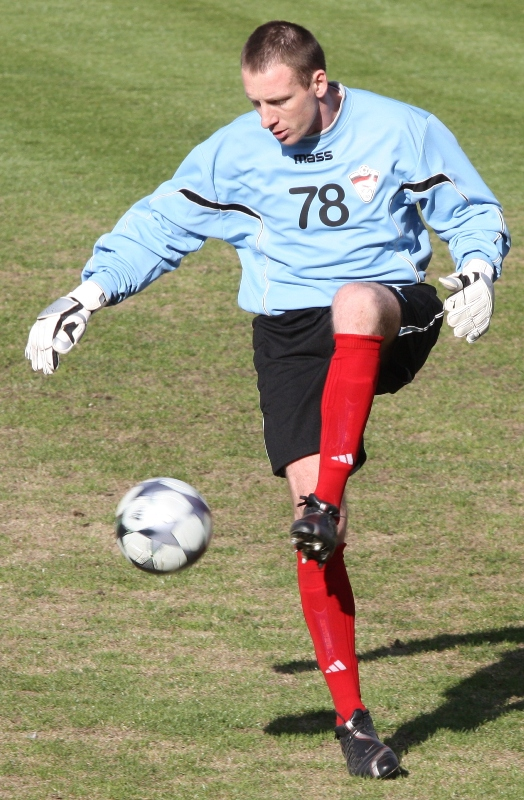

Personal information
- Full name: Pavelas Andreevich Leusas
- Date of birth: 15 September 1978 (age 48)
- Place of birth: Vilnius, Lithuanian SSR, Soviet Union
- Height: 1.87 m (6 ft 2 in)
- Position: Goalkeeper

Senior career*
Years	Team	Apps	(Gls)
1995–1997	Panerys Vilnius	29	(0)
1997–2000	Žalgiris	62	(0)
2001	Orlen Płock	2	(0)
2001	Žalgiris	10	(0)
2002	Fakel Voronezh	2	(0)
2002–2003	Zhetysu	1	(0)
2003	Žalgiris	19	(0)
2004	Alma-Ata	17	(0)
2005	Žalgiris	4	(0)
2005–2006	Alma-Ata	34	(0)
2007	FK Vilnius	10	(0)
2007	Alma-Ata	9	(0)
2008	Nasaf Qarshi	8	(0)
2009	Atlantis	11	(0)
2010	Žalgiris	3	(0)
2011	Buxoro	7	(0)
2012	Qizilqum Zarafshon	12	(0)
2013	Shurtan Guzar	3	(0)
2013	Navbahor Namangan	10	(0)
2014–2017	Utenis Utena		

International career
1998–2001	Lithuania	8	(0)
- * Club domestic league appearances and goals

Pavelas Andreevich Leusas (born 15 September 1978) is a Lithuanian former professional footballer who played as a goalkeeper.

== Career ==
He has played for Žalgiris Vilnius and 2008 was goalkeeper of Nasaf Qarshi. Leusas had a brief stint in the Polish Ekstraklasa with Orlen Płock during the 2000–01 season. He also had spells in the Russian First Division, with FC Fakel Voronezh during the 2002 season, and the Kazakhstan Premier League, with FC Almaty and FC Zhetysu.

In February 2013, he moved to Shurtan Guzar.

== International career ==
Leusas has made eight appearances for the Lithuania national team between 1998 and 2001.

== Honours ==
Žalgiris

- A Lyga: 1998–99
- Lithuanian Cup: 2003

Alma-Ata

- Kazakhstan Cup: 2006
