= Oleksandr Tarasenko (footballer, born 1978) =

Ukrainian footballer (born 1978)

Personal information
- Full name: Oleksandr Viktorovych Tarasenko
- Date of birth: 11 December 1978 (age 47)
- Place of birth: Zhovti Vody, Dnipropetrovsk Oblast, Ukrainian SSR
- Position: Defender

Senior career*
Years	Team	Apps	(Gls)
1993–1994	FC Sirius Zhovti Vody	2	(0)
1997–2004	Olympia FC AEC	73	(12)
2001–2002	→MFC Mykolaiv (loan)	18	(0)
2004–2005	FC Hirnyk-Sport Horishni Plavni	11	(0)
2005–2006	FC Ihroservice Simferopol	4	(0)
2006–2009	FC Oleksandriya	79	(5)
2009–2009	FC Naftovyk-Ukrnafta Okhtyrka	53	(1)
2011–2012	MFC Mykolaiv	20	(1)
2012	FK Buxoro		
2011–2013	MFC Mykolaiv	16	(1)
2011–2013	FC Tytan Armyansk	9	(0)
2014	FK Klaipėdos Granitas	24	(0)
2015	FK Kruoja Pakruojis	4	(0)
2016	FC Holovkivka		
2017	FC Ukraine United		
2018–2019	FC Vorkuta		
- * Club domestic league appearances and goals as of 17 April 2019

Oleksandr Tarasenko (born 11 December 1978) is a Ukrainian footballer who played as a defender.

== Career ==
Tarasenko played in 1994 with FC Sirius. In 1998, he played in the Ukrainian Second League with Olympia FC AEC, and was loaned to FC Mykolaiv in 2001. In 2004, he played with FC Hirnyk-Sport Horishni Plavni, and the following season he played in the Ukrainian First League with FC Ihroservice Simferopol. He continued playing in the Ukrainian First League with FC Oleksandriya in 2006, and later with FC Naftovyk-Ukrnafta Okhtyrka. In 2010, he returned to play with FC Mykolaiv, and secured the Ukrainian Second League title. The following season played abroad in the Uzbekistan Super League with FK Buxoro.

After a season abroad he returned to play with FC Mykolaiv. The following season he played with FC Tytan Armyansk. In 2014, he played in the A Lyga with FK Klaipėdos Granitas. In 2015, he signed with FK Kruoja Pakruojis, and featured in the 2015–16 UEFA Europa League against Jagiellonia Białystok. In 2016, he played in the Ukrainian Amateur Football Championship with FC Golovkovka. In 2017, he played abroad for the third time in the Canadian Soccer League with FC Ukraine United, where he assisted the Toronto club in achieving a perfect season, and winning the Second Division Championship. In 2018, he was transferred to FC Vorkuta where he won the CSL Championship.

== Honors ==
MFC Mykolaiv

- Ukrainian Second League: 2010–11

FC Ukraine United

- CSL DII Championship: 2017
- Canadian Soccer League Second Division: 2017

FC Vorkuta

- CSL Championship: 2018
- Canadian Soccer League First Division: 2019
