= Andrei Usachyov =

Russian footballer

Personal information
- Full name: Andrei Aleksandrovich Usachyov
- Date of birth: 29 April 1986 (age 40)
- Place of birth: Orsk, Russian SFSR
- Height: 1.80 m (5 ft 11 in)
- Position: Defender

Youth career
- FC Lokomotiv Moscow

Senior career*
| Years | Team | Apps | (Gls) |
| 2003–2005 | FC Lokomotiv Moscow | 0 | (0) |
| 2006–2007 | FK Vėtra | 24 | (0) |
| 2007–2008 | FC KAMAZ Naberezhnye Chelny | 2 | (0) |
| 2008–2009 | FC MVD Rossii Moscow | 30 | (1) |
| 2009 | FC Gazovik Orenburg | 10 | (0) |
| 2010 | FK Vėtra | 15 | (0) |
| 2010 | Wigry Suwałki | 13 | (0) |
| 2011 | FK Banga Gargždai | 10 | (1) |
| 2011 | FK REO Vilnius | | |
| 2012 | Qizilqum Zarafshon | 3 | (0) |
- * Club domestic league appearances and goals

Andrei Aleksandrovich Usachyov (Russian: Андрей Александрович Усачёв; born 29 April 1986) is a former Russian professional footballer.

== Club career ==
He made his debut for FC Lokomotiv Moscow on 12 November 2005 in a Russian Cup game against FC Metallurg-Kuzbass Novokuznetsk.

He played two seasons in the Russian Football National League for FC KAMAZ Naberezhnye Chelny and FC MVD Rossii Moscow.
