= Vitaly Rushnitsky =

Belarusian footballer

Personal information
- Date of birth: 17 January 1990 (age 36)
- Place of birth: Mosty, Grodno Oblast, Soviet Union
- Height: 1.80 m (5 ft 11 in)
- Position: Forward

Team information
- Current team: Stenles Pinsk

Youth career
- 2005–2007: Dinamo Minsk

Senior career*
Years	Team	Apps	(Gls)
2008–2010	Krylia Sovetov Samara	0	(0)
2009	→ Belshina Bobruisk (loan)	8	(1)
2011	Vedrich-97 Rechitsa	12	(0)
2011	Smorgon	12	(5)
2012	Shurtan Guzar	12	(0)
2012	Smorgon	6	(1)
2013	Polotsk	3	(0)
2014	Kolos-Druzhba Gorodische	19	(11)
2015–2016	Volna Pinsk	26	(25)
2016–2017	Slutsk	17	(1)
2017	Volna Pinsk	10	(2)
2018	UAS Zhitkovichi	5	(0)
2018	Lida	11	(0)
2019–2020	Stenles Pinsk	47	(43)
2021	Volna Pinsk	27	(4)
2022	Stenles Pinsk	18	(19)
2023	Novaya Pripyat Olshany	13	(12)
2023–	Stenles Pinsk	8	(4)
- * Club domestic league appearances and goals as of 31 December 2023

Vitaly Rushnitsky (Belarusian: Віталь Рушніцкі; Russian: Виталий Рушницкий; born 17 January 1990) is a Belarusian footballer who plays for Stenles Pinsk.
