= Dilshod Rakhmatullaev =

Uzbek footballer (born 1989)

Personal information
- Date of birth: 17 February 1989 (age 37)
- Place of birth: Toshkent, Uzbekistan
- Height: 1.78 m (5 ft 10 in)
- Position: Midfielder

Team information
- Current team: Nasaf
- Number: 7

Senior career*
Years	Team	Apps	(Gls)
2010	Lokomotiv Tashkent	16	(0)
2011	→ Olmaliq (loan)	16	(2)
2012–2013	Lokomotiv Tashkent	44	(4)
2014	→ Şanlıurfaspor (loan)	10	(1)
2014–2015	Lokomotiv Tashkent	30	(3)
2016–2017	Nasaf	35	(1)
2018–2019	Pakhtakor	27	(1)
2019	→ Andijon (loan)	21	(0)
2020	Nasaf	25	(1)
2021	Metallurg Bekabad	23	(1)
2022	Kokand 1912	20	
2023–	Dinamo Samarqand	20	(4)

International career^{‡}
2013–	Uzbekistan	5	(0)
- * Club domestic league appearances and goals as of 22:36, 08 December 2023 (UTC) ‡ National team caps and goals as of 10 August 2014

Dilshod Rakhmatullaev (born 17 February 1989) is an Uzbek professional footballer who plays as a midfielder for FC Nasaf.

== Career ==
He started playing career at Lokomotiv Tashkent in 2010. In January 2014 he moved on loan to Şanlıurfaspor. In July 2014 he left Şanlıurfaspor. Rakhmatullaev rejoined Lokomotiv at end of July 2014 and played until end of 2015 season. He left Lokomotiv and joined Nasaf Qarshi for 2016 season.

== International ==
Rakhmatullaev made his official debut for the national team on 29 January 2012 in a friendly match against UAE.

== Honours ==
Lokomotiv
Uzbek League runner-up (3): 2013, 2014, 2015
Uzbek Cup (1): 2014
Uzbekistan Super Cup (1): 2015

Nasaf
Uzbekistan Super Cup (1): 2016
