= Vladimir Chekunov =

Russian footballer

Personal information
- Full name: Vladimir Viktorovich Chekunov
- Date of birth: 9 February 1983 (age 43)
- Place of birth: Volgograd, Russian SFSR
- Height: 1.83 m (6 ft 0 in)
- Positions: Midfielder; defender

Senior career*
Years	Team	Apps	(Gls)
1998	FC Olimpia Volgograd (amateur)		
2000	FC Olimpia Volgograd	0	(0)
2001–2002	FC Krasnodar-2000	23	(0)
2002	FC Uralan Elista	0	(0)
2003	FC Chernomorets Novorossiysk	0	(0)
2003	FC Don Novomoskovsk	5	(0)
2004	FC Tekstilshchik Kamyshin	23	(1)
2005	FC Lokomotiv-NN Nizhny Novgorod	9	(0)
2005	FC Druzhba Maykop	8	(0)
2006	FC Krasnodar-2000	14	(0)
2006	FC Khimki	0	(0)
2007	FC Sochi-04	18	(0)
2008	FC Volgar-Gazprom-2 Astrakhan	22	(0)
2009	FC Energiya Volzhsky	3	(0)
2010	FC Okean Nakhodka	28	(1)
2011	FC Slavyane Salsk		
2012	Navbahor Namangan	9	(0)
- * Club domestic league appearances and goals

Vladimir Viktorovich Chekunov (Russian: Владимир Викторович Чекунов; born 9 February 1983) is a former Russian professional football player.

== Club career ==
He made his debut for FC Khimki on 20 September 2006 in a Russian Cup game against FC Rostov.
