= Naoya Shibamura =

Japanese footballer

Naoya Shibamura 柴村 直弥
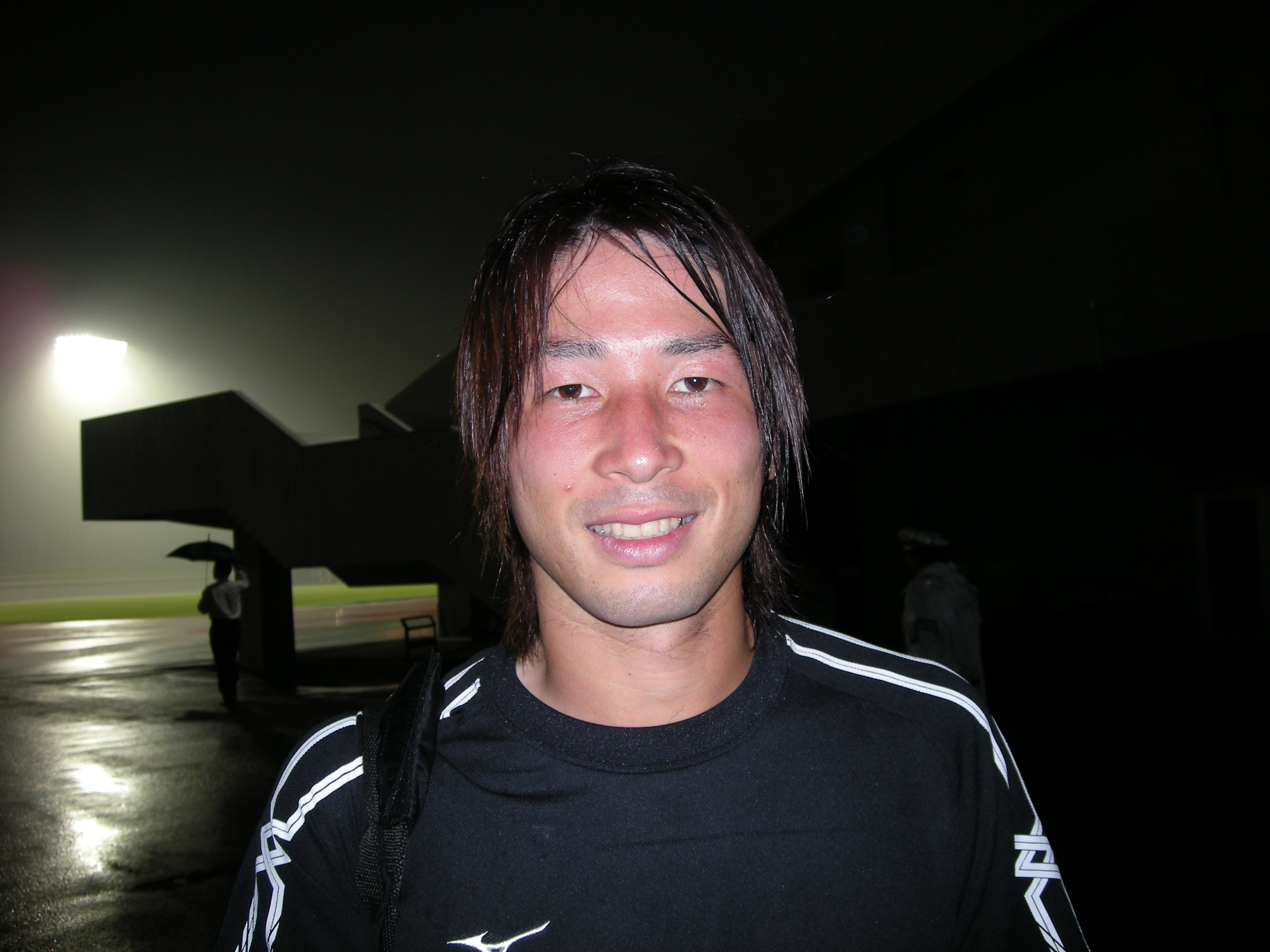

Personal information
- Full name: Naoya Shibamura
- Date of birth: 11 September 1982 (age 44)
- Place of birth: Hiroshima, Japan
- Height: 1.79 m (5 ft 10 in)
- Position: Defender

Team information
- Current team: Ishikawa SC
- Number: 24

Youth career
- 2001–2004: Chuo University

Senior career*
Years	Team	Apps	(Gls)
2005–2006	Albirex Niigata; Singapore	26	(0)
2007	Avispa Fukuoka	6	(0)
2008	Tokushima Vortis	18	(0)
2009–2010	Gainare Tottori	13	(1)
2010	→ Fujieda MYFC (loan)	4	(1)
2011–2012	Ventspils	16	(1)
2012	Pakhtakor Tashkent	1	(0)
2012–2013	Buxoro	38	(0)
2014–2015	Stomil Olsztyn	2	(0)
2016	Ventforet Kofu	0	(0)
2017	Criacao Shinjuku		
2018–2019	Nankatsu SC		
2020–2023	Shibuya City		
2023–	Ishikawa SC		
- * Club domestic league appearances and goals as of 11 September 2024

Naoya Shibamura (柴村 直弥, Shibamura Naoya; born 11 September 1982) is a Japanese professional footballer who plays as a defender for Ishikawa SC.

== Career ==
Shibamura previously played for Avispa Fukuoka, Tokushima Vortis and Gainare Tottori in the J. League. In March 2011, he signed a contract with Latvian Higher League club FK Ventspils for one season. In 2012, he joined Uzbek club Pakhtakor Tashkent, and became the first Japanese player in Uzbekistan.

== Club statistics ==
As of 23 February 2018

Club	Season	League			Emperor's Cup		J. League Cup		Total	
Club	Season	Division	Apps	Goals	Apps	Goals	Apps	Goals	Apps	Goals
Avispa Fukuoka	2007	J2 League	6	0	0	0	—		6	0
Tokushima Vortis	2008	J2 League	18	0	0	0	—		18	0
Gainare Tottori	2009	JFL	13	1	0	0	—		13	1
Fujieda MYFC (loan)	2010	JRL (Tokai, Div. 1)	4	1	—		—		4	1
Ventforet Kofu	2016	J1 League	0	0	0	0	1	0	1	0
Career total			41	2	0	0	1	0	42	2

== Honours ==
FK Ventspils

- Latvian Higher League: 2011
- Latvian Cup: 2010–11
