= Artūras Fomenka =

Lithuanian footballer (1977–2026)

Personal information
- Date of birth: 14 February 1977
- Place of birth: Panevėžys, Lithuanian SSR, USSR (now Lithuania)
- Date of death: 31 August 2026 (aged 49)
- Height: 1.85 m (6 ft 1 in)
- Position: Forward

Senior career*
Years	Team	Apps	(Gls)
1993–1996	Ekranas	52	(8)
1996–1999	Kareda Šiauliai	67	(33)
2000–2002	Rostselmash Rostov-on-Don	60	(13)
2003	Volgar-Gazprom	31	(5)
2004	Aktobelento	20	(5)
2005	Kairat	18	(9)
2006	Sūduva Marijampolė	1	(0)
2007	Kaisar	15	(4)
2008	Andijan	13	(2)
2008–2010	Olmaliq	57	(10)
2011	Sogdiana Jizzakh	13	(5)
2011	Bukhoro	12	(1)
2012	Navbahor Namangan	10	(3)
2012	Lokomotiv Tashkent	11	(6)
2013	Shurtan Guzar	11	(2)

International career
1996–2003	Lithuania	23	(7)
- * Club domestic league appearances and goals

Artūras Fomenka (14 February 1977 – 31 August 2026) was a Lithuanian professional footballer who played as a forward.

== Career ==
Fomenka played two games in the UEFA Intertoto Cup 2000 for Rostselmash Rostov-on-Don. From 2008 to 2013 he played for several Uzbek League teams. In 2012, he played for Lokomotiv Tashkent in 11 matches, scoring six goals. Fomenka played in 2013 for Shurtan Guzar.

== Death ==
Fomenka died on 31 August 2026, at the age of 49.

== Honours ==
- A Lyga: 1997, 1998; runner-up 1999; third place 1994
- Kazakhstan Premier League third place: 2005
- Uzbek League third place: 2012
