= Sanibal Orahovac =

Montenegrin footballer (born 1978)

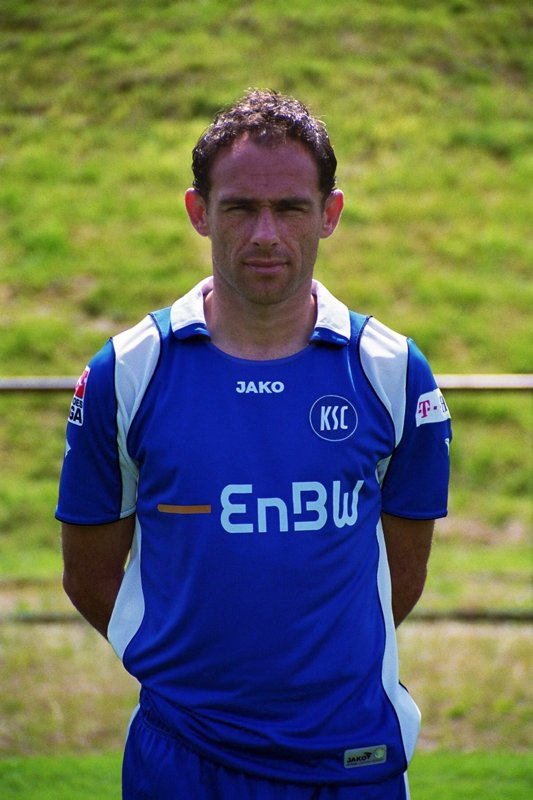
- Orahovac in 2007

Personal information
- Date of birth: 12 December 1978 (age 47)
- Place of birth: Titograd, SFR Yugoslavia
- Height: 1.79 m (5 ft 10 in)
- Positions: Striker; attacking midfielder

Senior career*
| Years | Team | Apps | (Gls) |
| 1997–1999 | Mladost Podgorica | 34 | (8) |
| 1999–2001 | Budućnost Podgorica | 59 | (10) |
| 2001–2004 | Red Star Belgrade | 39 | (7) |
| 2004–2005 | Vitória de Guimarães | 6 | (0) |
| 2005–2006 | Penafiel | 19 | (1) |
| 2006–2008 | Karlsruher SC | 17 | (0) |
| 2008–2008 | Erzgebirge Aue | 15 | (5) |
| 2008–2009 | Wehen Wiesbaden | 23 | (6) |
| 2009–2010 | FSV Frankfurt | 13 | (0) |
| 2010-2011 | Budućnost Podgorica | 30 | (4) |
| 2012 | Pakhtakor Tashkent | 2 | (1) |
| 2013–2014 | Mladost Podgorica | 8 | (2) |
| 2014 | Dečić | 12 | (2) |
- * Club domestic league appearances and goals

Sanibal Orahovac (Cyrillic: Санибал Ораховац; born 12 December 1978) is a Montenegrin former professional footballer who played as a striker or attacking midfielder.

== Career ==
Born in Titograd, what is now Podgorica, the capital of Montenegro, he started playing football at the local club Mladost Podgorica, where he became a member of the first team in 1997 and subsequently played two seasons before transferring to another local but more established club, Budućnost Podgorica, in 1999. He played for Budućnost in the following two seasons and went on to leave the club for Red Star Belgrade in 2001, subsequently spending three seasons with the Serbian club before moving abroad and signing with Portuguese club Vitória de Guimarães in the summer of 2004.

He only played for Vitória in the 2004–05 season and managed to make only six domestic league appearances for the club without scoring any goals. He continued to play in Portugal in the 2005–06 season as he signed with F.C. Penafiel, subsequently making a total of 19 domestic league appearances and scoring one goal for the club in the league. Penafiel were by far the worst-placed team in the Portuguese first division that season and were relegated to the second-division Liga de Honra for the 2006–07 season.

Orahovac left Penafiel upon the end of the 2005–06 season and went on to sign a two-year contract with then German 2. Bundesliga side Karlsruher SC in August 2006, making his league debut for the club on 21 August 2006 as a late substitute in their home match against 1. FC Kaiserslautern. On 31 January 2008, he moved to FC Erzgebirge Aue. Some months later, he moved to SV Wehen Wiesbaden. In July 2009, he was released and signed a one-year contract with FSV Frankfurt on 15 October 2009.

== Honours ==
Red Star Belgrade

- First League of Serbia and Montenegro: 2003–04
- Serbia and Montenegro Cup: 2002, 2004
