= 2011 Pakhtakor Tashkent FK season =

FC Pakhtakor
2011 season
- Chairman: Samvel Babayan
- Manager: Ravshan Khaydarov (until 24 September); Murod Ismailov (from 27 September)
- Uzbek League: 3rd
- Uzbek Cup: Champions
- AFC Champions League: Group stage
- Top goalscorer: League: Dušan Savić (7); All: Two Players (10)
Home colours	Away colours

The 2011 season was Pakhtakors 20th season in the top Uzbek League in Uzbekistan. Pakhtakor competed in Uzbek League, Uzbek Cup and AFC Champions League tournaments.

== Season events ==
On 24 September, following a 0-0 drew against Buxoro, Head Coach Ravshan Khaydarov resigned from his position, with Murod Ismailov being appointed as his replacement on 27 September.

== Squad ==
As of match played 13 November 2011

No.	Name	Nationality	Position	Date of birth (age)	Signed from	Signed in	Contract ends	Apps.	Goals
Goalkeepers
1	Nikita Ribkin	(Uzbekistan)	GK	20 January 1992 (aged 19)	Academy	2010			
30	Temur Juraev	(Uzbekistan)	GK	12 May 1984 (aged 27)	Qizilqum Zarafshon	2004			
33	Eldor Tajibaev	(Uzbekistan)	GK	3 June 1986 (aged 25)	Navbahor Namangan	2009			
Defenders
2	Egor Krimets	(Uzbekistan)	DF	27 January 1992 (aged 19)	Academy	2010			
3	Gulom Urunov	(Uzbekistan)	DF	7 June 1989 (aged 22)	Academy	2009			
4	Bojan Miladinović	(Serbia)	DF	24 April 1982 (aged 29)	Napredak Kruševac	2009			
12	Temur Kagirov	(Uzbekistan)	DF	24 May 1985 (aged 26)	Academy	2010			
13	Aleksandr Kletskov	(Uzbekistan)	DF	27 September 1985 (aged 26)	Tianjin Teda	2011			
16	Akmal Kholmurodov	(Uzbekistan)	DF	4 January 1989 (aged 22)	Navbahor Namangan	2010			
24	Davron Khashimov	(Uzbekistan)	DF	24 November 1992 (aged 18)	Academy	2011			
27	Ilhom Suyunov	(Uzbekistan)	DF	17 May 1983 (aged 28)	Mash'al Mubarek	2004			
29	Vladimir Kozak	(Uzbekistan)	DF	12 June 1993 (aged 18)	Academy	2010			
Midfielders
5	Akbar Ismatullaev	(Uzbekistan)	MF	10 January 1991 (aged 20)	Academy	2009			
7	Kakhi Makharadze	(Georgia (country))	MF	20 October 1987 (aged 24)	Lokomotiv Tashkent	2011			
8	Abbosbek Makhstaliev	(Uzbekistan)	MF	12 January 1994 (aged 17)	Academy	2011			
14	Sherzod Karimov	(Uzbekistan)	MF	26 January 1989 (aged 22)	Qizilqum Zarafshon	2009			
15	Jamshid Iskanderov	(Uzbekistan)	MF	16 October 1993 (aged 18)	Dinamo Samarqand	2011			
18	Sanat Shikhov	(Uzbekistan)	FW	28 December 1989 (aged 21)	Shaykhontohur	2008			
19	Bekzod Mirkhaydarov	(Uzbekistan)	MF	26 January 1991 (aged 20)	Academy	2011			
22	Abdumutallib Abdullaev	(Uzbekistan)	MF	19 September 1992 (aged 19)	Academy	2011			
25	Irakli Klimiashvili	(Georgia (country))	MF	30 May 1988 (aged 23)	on loan from Anzhi Makhachkala	2011	2012		
26	Dilshod Sharofetdinov	(Uzbekistan)	MF	15 October 1985 (aged 26)	Dinamo Samarqand	2009			
28	Stanislav Andreev	(Uzbekistan)	MF	6 May 1988 (aged 23)	Topalang Sariosiyo	2007			
	Davlatbek Yarbekov	(Uzbekistan)	MF	27 September 1994 (aged 17)	Academy	2011			
Forwards
9	Temurkhuja Abdukholiqov	(Uzbekistan)	FW	25 September 1991 (aged 20)	Bunyodkor	2011			
10	Farhod Tadjiyev	(Uzbekistan)	FW	9 April 1986 (aged 25)	Tianjin Teda	2010			
11	Igor Sergeyev	(Uzbekistan)	FW	30 April 1993 (aged 18)	Academy	2011			
21	Timur Khakimov	(Uzbekistan)	FW	23 August 1994 (aged 17)	Academy	2011			
23	Alisher Azizov	(Uzbekistan)	FW	14 February 1990 (aged 21)	Academy	2009			
Players away on loan
6	Murod Kholmukhamedov	(Uzbekistan)	DF	23 December 1990 (aged 20)	Academy	2008			
20	Ildar Magdeev	(Uzbekistan)	MF	11 April 1984 (aged 27)	Buxoro	2002			
Players who left during the season
21	Kamoliddin Tajiev	(Uzbekistan)	DF	3 May 1983 (aged 28)	Academy	2002			
25	Dušan Savić	(North Macedonia)	FW	1 October 1985 (aged 26)	Incheon United	2011			

== Transfers ==
=== In ===
Date	Position	Nationality	Name	From	Fee	Ref.
1 January 2011	DF	(Uzbekistan)	Aleksandr Kletskov	Tianjin Teda	Undisclosed	
1 January 2011	DF	(Uzbekistan)	Temur Kagirov	Incheon United	Undisclosed	
1 January 2011	DF	(Uzbekistan)	Shavkat Nasibullaev	Qizilqum Zarafshon	Undisclosed	
1 January 2011	FW	(North Macedonia)	Dušan Savić	Incheon United	Undisclosed	
1 January 2011	FW	(Uzbekistan)	Temurkhuja Abdukholiqov	Bunyodkor-2	Undisclosed	
26 February 2011	MF	(Georgia (country))	Kakhi Makharadze	Lokomotiv Tashkent	Undisclosed	

=== Loans in ===
Start date	Position	Nationality	Name	From	End date	Ref.
1 August 2011	MF	(Georgia (country))	Irakli Klimiashvili	Anzhi Makhachkala	30 June 2012	

=== Out ===
Start date	Position	Nationality	Name	To	Fee	Ref.
1 July 2011	DF	(Uzbekistan)	Kamoliddin Tajiev	Jiangsu	Undisclosed	
1 September 2011	FW	(North Macedonia)	Dušan Savić	Rabotnički	Undisclosed	

=== Loans out ===
Start date	Position	Nationality	Name	To	End date	Ref.
1 January 2011	FW	(Uzbekistan)	Ruzimboy Akhmedov	Navbahor Namangan		
9 February 2011	MF	(Uzbekistan)	Odil Ahmedov	Anzhi Makhachkala	30 June 2012	
26 February 2011	FW	(Uzbekistan)	Alexander Geynrikh	Suwon Bluewings	31 December 2011	
27 March 2011	DF	(Uzbekistan)	Akram Bakhridtinov	Lokomotiv Tashkent	31 December 2011	
27 March 2011	DF	(Uzbekistan)	Azamat Mamajonov	Lokomotiv Tashkent	31 December 2011	
1 July 2011	DF	(Uzbekistan)	Murod Kholmukhamedov	Dalian Shide	31 December 2011	
1 July 2011	FW	(Uzbekistan)	Farkhod Nishonov	Kohtla-Järve Lootus	31 December 2011	
1 September 2011	MF	(Uzbekistan)	Bobur Abdurakhmonov	Kohtla-Järve Lootus	31 December 2011	

=== Released ===
Date	Position	Nationality	Name	Joined	Date	Ref.
31 December 2011	MF	(Uzbekistan)	Abdumutallib Abdullaev			
31 December 2011	MF	(Uzbekistan)	Akramzhon Bakhritdinov	Andijon		
31 December 2011	MF	(Uzbekistan)	Davlatbek Yarbekov			
31 December 2011	FW	(Uzbekistan)	Ruzimboy Akhmedov	Dinamo Samarqand		
31 December 2011	FW	(Uzbekistan)	Alexander Geynrikh	Emirates Club		

== Friendlies ==
10 February 2011	Pakhtakor Tashkent	0–2	Astra Giurgiu	Antalya, Turkey
			Goal

12 February 2011	Pakhtakor Tashkent	3–1	Debreceni VSC	Antalya, Turkey
	Shikhov 38'; Miladinović 68'; T.Abdukholiqov 71'		Czvitkovics 54'

15 February 2011	Pakhtakor Tashkent	0–2	Zeta	Antalya, Turkey
			Goal

17 February 2011	Pakhtakor Tashkent	1–3	Illichivets Mariupol	Antalya, Turkey
	B.Miladinović 35' (pen.)		I.Kryvosheyenko 4'; Antonov 78'; Fedotov 90'

== Competitions ==
Pakhtakor competed in all major competitions: Uzbek League, the Uzbek Cup and the AFC Champions League.

=== Overview ===
Competition	First match	Last match	Starting round	Final position	Record							
Competition	First match	Last match	Starting round	Final position	Pld	W	D	L	GF	GA	GD	Win %
Uzbek League	5 March 2011	5 November 2011	Matchday 1	3rd	26	15	6	5	33	17	+16	57.69
Uzbekistan Cup	29 April 2011	13 November 2011	Round of 32	Winners	8	6	2	0	19	5	+14	75.00
AFC Champions League	1 March 2011	11 May 2011	Group Stage	Group Stage	6	1	2	3	8	14	−6	16.67
Total					40	22	10	8	60	36	+24	55.00

Last updated: 13 November 2011
Source: Competitions

=== Uzbek League ===
==== League table ====
Pos	Team	Pld	W	D	L	GF	GA	GD	Pts	Qualification or relegation
1	Bunyodkor	26	19	4	3	51	14	+37	61	2012 AFC Champions League Group stage
2	Nasaf Qarshi	26	15	8	3	43	15	+28	53	2012 AFC Champions League Group stage
3	Pakhtakor Tashkent	26	15	6	5	33	17	+16	51	2012 AFC Champions League Group stage
4	Neftchi Farg'ona	26	13	5	8	36	27	+9	44	2012 AFC Champions League Qualifying play-off (Note: Since Pakhtakor also won the 2011 Uzbekistan Cup, the fourth-placed team of the league also qualified for the 2012 AFC Champions League.)
5	Mash'al Mubarek	26	12	4	10	32	33	−1	40	

Updated to match(es) played on 9 November 2011. Source: Uzbekistan Professional Football League
Rules for classification: 1) points; 2) goal difference; 3) number of goals scored.

==== Results summary ====
Overall								Home						Away					
Pld	W	D	L	GF	GA	GD	Pts	W	D	L	GF	GA	GD	W	D	L	GF	GA	GD
26	15	6	5	33	17	+16	51	10	3	0	20	4	+16	5	3	5	13	13	0

Last updated: 5 November 2011.
Source: See Results

==== Results ====
5 March 2011 1	Pakhtakor Tashkent	2 – 0	Qizilqum Zarafshon	Tashkent
16:00 UZT (UTC+5)	Miladinović 3'; Tadjiev (yellow card) 84'; Kholmurodov (yellow card) 87'; Abdukholiqov 88'	Report	Frank (yellow card) 68'; Kuzin (yellow card) 71'	Stadium: Central Stadium; Attendance: 7,515; Referee: Vadim Agishev

10 March 2011 2	Olmaliq	0 – 1	Pakhtakor Tashkent	Olmaliq
15:30 UZT (UTC+5)	Ergashev (yellow card) 47'; Rahmatullayev (yellow card) 51'	Report	Savić (yellow card) 31'; Miladinović (yellow card) 35'; Sharofetdinov 43'; Makharadze (yellow card) 84'; Suyunov (yellow card) 85'	Stadium: Metallurg Stadium; Attendance: 7,201; Referee: Sultan Zailobidinov

22 March 2011 3	Pakhtakor Tashkent	1 – 0	Neftchi Fergana	Tashkent
17:00 UZT (UTC+5)	Suyunov (yellow card) 66'; Makharadze 15'	Report	Nizametdinov (yellow card) 27'; Khakimov (yellow card) 86'; Pulatov (yellow card) 90+2'	Stadium: Central Stadium; Attendance: 4,025; Referee: Valentin Kovalenko

1 April 2011 4	Pakhtakor Tashkent	0 – 0	Nasaf	Tashkent
17:00 UZT (UTC+5)	Miladinović (yellow card) 43'	Report		Stadium: Central Stadium; Attendance: 10,328; Referee: Ravshan Irmatov

10 April 2011 5	Sogdiana Jizzakh	1 – 2	Pakhtakor Tashkent	Termez
16:00 UZT (UTC+5)	Ayzatulov (yellow card) 17'; Fomenka 48'	Report	Savić 20', 60'; Tajiev (yellow card) 40'	Stadium: Alpamish Stadium; Attendance: 9,181; Referee: Oleg Rubakov

14 April 2011 6	Pakhtakor Tashkent	1 – 0	Buxoro	Tashkent
17:30 UZT (UTC+5)	Savić 49'; Andreev (yellow card) 83'	Report	Narzullaev (yellow card) 55'; Kvesieshvili (yellow card) 59'	Stadium: Central Stadium; Attendance: 10,328; Referee: Ravshan Irmatov

24 April 2011 7	Mash'al Mubarek	1 – 0	Pakhtakor Tashkent	Muborak
17:00 UZT (UTC+5)	Khodykin 21'	Report	Ismatullaev (yellow card) 68'	Stadium: Bahrom Vafoev Stadium; Attendance: 5,655; Referee: Sultan Zailobidinov

15 May 2011 8	Pakhtakor Tashkent	2 – 1	Navbahor Namangan	Tashkent
18:00 UZT (UTC+5)	Abdukholiqov 28'; Andreev (yellow card) 29'; Savić 35'; Kozak (yellow card) 44'; Kholmurodov (yellow card) 82'	Report	Аgboh (yellow card) 11'; Valizhonov 31'	Stadium: Central Stadium; Attendance: 4,232; Referee: Bakhtiyor Namazov

19 May 2011 9	Metallurg Bekabad	0 – 1	Pakhtakor Tashkent	Bekabad
17:30 UZT (UTC+5)	Isabayev (yellow card) 22' (yellow-red card) 37'	Report	Kholmukhamedov (yellow card) 30'; Suyunov (yellow card) 33'; Savić 70'	Stadium: Metallurg Bekabad Stadium; Attendance: 5,686; Referee: Rustam Saidov

11 June 2011 11	Shurtan Guzar	0 – 2	Pakhtakor Tashkent	Gʻuzor
19:00 UZT (UTC+5)	Sultanov (yellow card) 41'; Ibragimov (yellow card) 45'; Agaliev (yellow card) 59'	Report	Krushelnitskiy 18' (o.g.); Kozak (yellow card) 31'; Karimov 70'; Sharofetdinov (yellow card) 79'	Stadium: G'uzor Stadium; Attendance: 6,722; Referee: Sultan Zailobidinov

15 June 2011 12	Pakhtakor Tashkent	3 – 1	Dinamo Samarqand	Tashkent
19:00 UZT (UTC+5)	Kholmurodov (yellow card) 10'; Shikhov 25'; Tajiev (yellow card) 47'; Savić 51', 85'; Makharadze (yellow card) 68'	Report	Klishin 19' (yellow card) 70'; Gribanov (yellow card) 75'	Stadium: Central Stadium; Attendance: 1,565; Referee: Ilgiz Tantashev

1 July 2011 13	Andijon	2 – 1	Pakhtakor Tashkent	Andijan
18:00 UZT (UTC+5)	Soliyev 25', 40'; Atakhanov (yellow card) 42' (yellow-red card) 86'	Report	Andreev 30'; Miladinović (yellow card) 54'; Tajiev (yellow card) 86'	Stadium: Soghlom Avlod Stadium; Attendance: 8,443; Referee: Valentin Kovalenko

7 July 2011 10	Pakhtakor Tashkent	0 – 0	Bunyodkor	Tashkent
20:05 UZT (UTC+5)		Report		Stadium: Central Stadium; Attendance: 8,503; Referee: Ravshan Irmatov

30 July 2011 14	Pakhtakor Tashkent	5 – 1	Andijon	Tashkent
19:00 UZT (UTC+5)	Andreev 3'; Tadjiyev 15'; Kletskov (yellow card) 53'; Casian 55' (o.g.); Karimov 76'; Makharadze 81' (yellow card) 83'	Report	Tselykh 1'; Khodjaev (yellow card) 32'; Polovkov (yellow card) 48'	Stadium: Central Stadium; Attendance: 3,444; Referee: Sultan Zailobidinov

5 August 2011 15	Dinamo Samarqand	0 – 0	Pakhtakor Tashkent	Samarkand
17:50 UZT (UTC+5)	Abdurakhmanov (yellow card) 28'; Nagaev (yellow card) 63'	Report		Stadium: Dinamo Stadium; Attendance: 11,352; Referee: Ravshan Irmatov

13 August 2011 16	Pakhtakor Tashkent	3 – 1	Shurtan Guzar	Tashkent
19:00 UZT (UTC+5)	Klimiashvili 5'; Kholmurodov (yellow card) 32'; Abdukholiqov 44'; Krimets 72'	Report	Afonin (yellow card) 17'; Erkinov 21'; Agbo (yellow card) 82'	Stadium: Central Stadium; Attendance: 2,462; Referee: Rustam Saidov

21 August 2011 17	Bunyodkor	2 – 1	Pakhtakor Tashkent	Tashkent
20:00 UZT (UTC+5)	Gafurov (yellow card) 52'; Ibrokhimov (yellow card) 69'; Karpenko 70'; Trifunović 72'; Jadigerov (yellow card) 90'	Report	Tadjiyev (yellow card) 48'; Suyunov (yellow card) 74'; Azizov 89'	Stadium: JAR Stadium; Attendance: 8,469; Referee: Ravshan Irmatov

25 August 2011 18	Pakhtakor Tashkent	0 – 0	Metallurg Bekabad	Tashkent
19:00 UZT (UTC+5)	Shikhov (yellow card) 35'; Kholmurodov (yellow card) 38'	Report	Abdullayev (yellow card) 26'; Karimov (yellow card) 67'; Isabayev (yellow card) 76'; Kalević (yellow card) 90'	Stadium: Central Stadium; Attendance: 1,231; Referee: Shukhrat Bazarov

24 September 2011 21	Buxoro	0 – 0	Pakhtakor Tashkent	Bukhara
16:30 UZT (UTC+5)	Romanchuk (yellow card) 67'	Report	Klimiashvili (yellow card) 61'; Khashimov (yellow card) 90+1'	Stadium: Buxoro Arena; Attendance: 6,126; Referee: Oleg Rubakov

10 October 2011 20	Pakhtakor Tashkent	1 – 0	Mash'al Mubarek	Tashkent
17:00 UZT (UTC+5)	Tadjiyev (yellow card) 12'; Krimets (yellow card) 18'	Report	Petković (yellow card) 52'	Stadium: Central Stadium; Attendance: 903; Referee: Sultan Zailobidinov

14 October 2011 19	Navbahor Namangan	2 – 0	Pakhtakor Tashkent	Namangan
15:30 UZT (UTC+5)	Romanenco (yellow card) 7'; Tairov (yellow card) 17'; Askaraliyev (yellow card) 17'; Shadrin 19', 24'; Nizambayev (yellow card) 90+3'	Report	Shikhov (yellow card) 85'	Stadium: Markaziy Stadium; Attendance: 11,975; Referee: Valentin Kovalenko

2 October 2011 22	Pakhtakor Tashkent	1 – 0	Sogdiana Jizzakh	Tashkent
17:12 UZT (UTC+5)	Khashimov (yellow card) 32'; Klimiashvili (yellow card) 35'; Makharadze 70'; Andreev (yellow card) 90'; Suyunov (yellow card) 90+3'	Report	Djuraev (yellow card) 35' (yellow-red card) 67'	Stadium: Central Stadium; Attendance: 926; Referee: Ilgiz Tantashev

22 October 2011 24	Neftchi Fergana	4 – 1	Pakhtakor Tashkent	Fergana
16:00 UZT (UTC+5)	Berdiev 1', 39'; Khalikov 8', 53'; Tukhtakhujaev (yellow card) 24'	Report	Abdukholiqov (yellow card) 23'; Andreev 24' (pen.)	Stadium: Fargona Stadium; Attendance: 17,236; Referee: Ravshan Irmatov

9 November 2011 23	Nasaf	1 – 1	Pakhtakor Tashkent	Qarshi
11:53 UZT (UTC+5)	Musaev (red card) 20'; Jiamurodov (yellow card) 32' (goal) 89' (pen.); Bošković (yellow card) 51'; Geworkýan (yellow card) 90+4'; Mališić (yellow card) 90+5'	Report	Jiamurodov 6' (o.g.); Kholmurodov (yellow card) 20'; Krimets (yellow card) 24'; Karimov (yellow card) 44'; Abdukholiqov (yellow card) 73'; Juraev (yellow card) 90+3'; Andreev (yellow card) 90+5'	Stadium: Markaziy Stadium; Attendance: 3,838; Referee: Sultan Zailobidinov

1 November 2011 25	Pakhtakor Tashkent	1 – 0	Olmaliq	Tashkent
14:30 UZT (UTC+5)	Sharofetdinov (yellow card) 71'; Karimov 76' (yellow card) 88'	Report	Vostrikov (yellow card) 81' (yellow-red card) 85'	Stadium: Central Stadium; Attendance: 11,152; Referee: Olim Talibdjanov

5 November 2011 26	Qizilqum Zarafshon	0 – 3	Pakhtakor Tashkent	Zarafshon
14:30 UZT (UTC+5)	Rustamov (yellow card) 41'; Lyubinsky (yellow card) 43'; Eshboyev (yellow card) 50'; Djuraev (yellow card) 80'	Report	Karimov 7' (yellow card) 64'; Tadjiyev 66'; Sharofetdinov 81' (pen.); Krimets (yellow card) 90+2'	Stadium: Progress Stadium; Attendance: 4,216; Referee: Vadim Agishev

=== Uzbek Cup ===
29 April 2011 Round of 32	Spartak Tashkent	0 – 5	Pakhtakor Tashkent	Tashkent
16:00 UZT (UTC+5)			Savić 31', 74'; Andreev 70' (pen.); Shikhov 72'; Kozak 80'	Stadium: Central Stadium; Attendance: 356; Referee: A.Rubakov

24 May 2011 Round of 16 1st leg	Pakhtakor Tashkent	3 – 1	Andijon	Tashkent
19:00 UZT (UTC+5)	Sharofetdinov (yellow card) 14' (goal) 27', 65'; Juraev (yellow card) 40'; Andreev 51' (pen.)	Report	Raimqulov (yellow card) 15'; Casian 42' (pen.); Azizov (yellow card) 50'	Stadium: Central Stadium; Attendance: 4,352; Referee: Vadim Agishev

27 June 2011 Round of 16 2nd leg	Andijon	1 – 4 (2 – 7 agg.)	Pakhtakor Tashkent	Andijan
18:00 UZT (UTC+5)	Soliev (yellow card) 17' (goal) 49' (pen.); Djumabayev (yellow card) 72'	Report	Sharofetdinov 19'; Kozak (yellow card) 49'; Andreev 64', 70'; Shikhov 83'	Stadium: Soghlom Avlod Stadium; Referee: Ravshan Irmatov

2 August 2011 Quarter-final 1st leg	Neftchi Fergana	0 – 1	Pakhtakor Tashkent	Fergana
UZT (UTC+5)	Mukhiddinov (yellow card) 35'; Chilmatov (yellow card) 43'	Report	Andreev 44' (pen.); Tadjiyev (yellow card) 67'	Stadium: Istiqlol Stadium; Referee: V.Kovalenko

17 August 2011 Quarter-final 2nd leg	Pakhtakor Tashkent	2 – 1 (3 – 0 agg.)	Neftchi Fergana	Tashkent
19:00 UZT (UTC+5)	Sharofetdinov 25' (pen.); Makharadze 43'; Suyunov (yellow card) 67'; Kholmurodov (yellow card) 67'	Report	Pulatov (yellow card) 24'; Jumaev 41'; Nurboev (yellow card) 70'	Stadium: Central Stadium; Referee: V.Serazetdinov

28 September 2011 Semi-final 1st leg	Shurtan Guzar	1 – 1	Pakhtakor Tashkent	Gʻuzor
17:00 UZT (UTC+5)	Taran (yellow card) 54'; Erkinov (yellow card) 71'; Amonov 74'	Report	Klimiashvili 52'	Stadium: G'uzor Stadium; Attendance: 5,680; Referee: Vadim Agishev

18 October 2011 Semi-final 2nd leg	Pakhtakor Tashkent	0 – 0 (1 – 1 agg.)	Shurtan Guzar	Tashkent
17:00 UZT (UTC+5)	Klimiashvili (yellow card) 84'	Report	Vujović (yellow card) 46'; Merzlyakov (yellow card) 76'	Stadium: Central Stadium; Referee: Viktor Serazetdinov

==== Final ====
13 November 2011 Final	Pakhtakor Tashkent	3 – 1	Nasaf	Tashkent
17:00 UZT (UTC+5)	Klimiashvili 5', 80'; Kletskov 29'; Khashimov (yellow card) 49'; Kozak (yellow card) 89'	Report	Bošković (yellow card) 19'; Mališić (yellow card) 28'; Geworkýan (yellow card) 50'; Jiamurodov (yellow card) 64' (goal) 90+2'	Stadium: Central Stadium; Referee: Ravshan Irmatov

=== AFC Champions League ===
==== Group stage ====
Pos	Team	Pld	W	D	L	GF	GA	GD	Pts	Qualification
1	(Qatar) Al-Sadd	6	2	4	0	8	6	+2	10	Advance to knockout stage
2	(Saudi Arabia) Al-Nassr	6	2	2	2	10	7	+3	8 (Note: Tiebreakers: Al-Nassr and Esteghlal are also tied on their head-to-head records (3 pts, 0 GD, 3 GF), and so are ranked by their overall goal difference.)	Advance to knockout stage
3	(Iran) Esteghlal	6	2	2	2	11	10	+1	8	
4	(Uzbekistan) Pakhtakor	6	1	2	3	8	14	−6	5	

Notes:

1 March 2011 1	Pakhtakor Tashkent (Uzbekistan)	2–2	(Saudi Arabia) Al Nassr	Tashkent, Uzbekistan
17:00 UZT (UTC+5)	Sharofetdinov (yellow card) 11' (goal) 61'; Karimov 45'; Tajiev (yellow card) 58'; Suyunov (yellow card) 70'; Abdukholiqov (yellow card) 87'	Report	Hawsawi (yellow card) 3'; McKain (yellow card) 30'; Al-Mutawa 51'; Ahmed -Dokhi (yellow card) 59'; Miladinović 88' (o.g.); Abbas (yellow card) 90+4'	Stadium: Central Stadium; Attendance: 15,000; Referee: Minoru Tojo (Japan)

16 March 2011 2	Al Sadd (Qatar)	2–1	(Uzbekistan) Pakhtakor Tashkent	Doha, Qatar
20:05 UZT (UTC+5)	Lee 45'; Kasola (yellow card) 52'; Afif 61'	Report	Kozak (yellow card) 17'; Miladinović (yellow card) 32'; Abdukholiqov 57'; Tajiev (red card) 90+3'	Stadium: Jassim bin Hamad Stadium; Attendance: 3,782; Referee: Choi Myung-Yong (Korea Republic)

6 April 2011 3	Esteghlal (Iran)	4–2	(Uzbekistan) Pakhtakor Tashkent	Tehran, Iran
18:00 UZT (UTC+5)	Shakouri (yellow card) 6'; Hawar 12'; Majidi 23'; Seyed-Salehi 58' (yellow card) 58'; Borhani 90+3'	Report	Juraev (yellow card) 11'; Savić 4'; Abdukholiqov (yellow card) 80'; Shikhov 90'	Stadium: Azadi Stadium; Attendance: 17,654; Referee: Ali Al Badwawi (UAE)

19 April 2011 4	Pakhtakor Tashkent (Uzbekistan)	2–1	(Iran) Esteghlal	Tashkent, Uzbekistan
18:00 UZT (UTC+5)	Krimets (yellow card) 14' (goal) 88'; Andreev 28'; Suyunov (yellow card) 68'	Report	Borhani 45' (yellow card) 71'; Omranzadeh (yellow card) 65' (yellow-red card) 86'	Stadium: Central Stadium; Attendance: 7,000

4 May 2011 5	Al Nassr (Saudi Arabia)	4–0	(Uzbekistan) Pakhtakor Tashkent	Riyadh, Saudi Arabia
22:45 UZT (UTC+5)	Hamood 8'; Al-Mutawa 24', 65'; Al-Sahlawi 61'; McKain (yellow card) 71'	Report	Sharofetdinov (yellow card) 37'; Kholmurodov (yellow card) 90+2'	Stadium: King Fahd International Stadium; Attendance: 4,034; Referee: Peter Green (Australia)

11 May 2011 6	Pakhtakor Tashkent (Uzbekistan)	1–1	(Qatar) Al Sadd	Tashkent, Uzbekistan
18:00 UZT (UTC+5)	Shikhov (yellow card) 45'; Andreev 60'; Tajibaev (yellow card) 63'; Kozak (yellow card) 74'; Mirkhaydarov (yellow card) 90'	Report	Siddiq 90+3'	Stadium: Central Stadium; Attendance: 2,950; Referee: Andre El Haddad (Lebanon)

== Squad statistics ==
As of match played 13 November 2011

=== Appearances and goals ===
No.	Pos	Nat	Player	Total		Uzbek League		Uzbek Cup		AFC Champions League	
No.	Pos	Nat	Player	Apps	Goals	Apps	Goals	Apps	Goals	Apps	Goals
1	GK	(Uzbekistan) UZB	Nikita Ribkin	8	0	5	0	0	0	3	0
2	DF	(Uzbekistan) UZB	Egor Krimets	19	2	12+4	1	0	0	3	1
3	DF	(Uzbekistan) UZB	Gulom Urunov	4	0	0+4	0	0	0	0	0
4	DF	(Serbia) SRB	Bojan Miladinović	11	1	7+1	1	0	0	3	0
5	MF	(Uzbekistan) UZB	Akbar Ismatullaev	30	0	24	0	0	0	6	0
7	MF	(Georgia (country)) GEO	Kakhi Makharadze	29	3	24+1	3	0	0	4	0
8	MF	(Uzbekistan) UZB	Abbosbek Makhstaliev	2	0	0+2	0	0	0	0	0
9	FW	(Uzbekistan) UZB	Temurkhuja Abdukholiqov	29	4	13+11	3	0	0	2+3	1
10	FW	(Uzbekistan) UZB	Farhod Tadjiyev	14	3	9+5	3	0	0	0	0
11	FW	(Uzbekistan) UZB	Igor Sergeyev	3	0	0+2	0	0	0	1	0
12	DF	(Uzbekistan) UZB	Temur Kagirov	4	0	0+1	0	0	0	1+2	0
13	DF	(Uzbekistan) UZB	Aleksandr Kletskov	7	0	5+2	0	0	0	0	0
14	MF	(Uzbekistan) UZB	Sherzod Karimov	23	5	13+7	4	0	0	3	1
15	MF	(Uzbekistan) UZB	Jamshid Iskanderov	1	0	0+1	0	0	0	0	0
16	DF	(Uzbekistan) UZB	Akmal Kholmurodov	20	0	15+2	0	0	0	2+1	0
18	MF	(Uzbekistan) UZB	Sanat Shikhov	23	2	5+12	1	0	0	3+3	1
19	MF	(Uzbekistan) UZB	Bekzod Mirkhaydarov	1	0	0	0	0	0	0+1	0
22	MF	(Uzbekistan) UZB	Abdumutallib Abdullaev	1	0	0+1	0	0	0	0	0
23	FW	(Uzbekistan) UZB	Alisher Azizov	23	1	8+9	1	0	0	3+3	0
24	DF	(Uzbekistan) UZB	Davron Khashimov	8	0	7+1	0	0	0	0	0
25	MF	(Georgia (country)) GEO	Irakli Klimiashvili	11	1	10+1	1	0	0	0	0
26	MF	(Uzbekistan) UZB	Dilshod Sharofetdinov	29	3	23+2	2	0	0	4	1
27	DF	(Uzbekistan) UZB	Ilhom Suyunov	27	0	22	0	0	0	5	0
28	MF	(Uzbekistan) UZB	Stanislav Andreev	28	5	21+1	3	0	0	6	2
29	DF	(Uzbekistan) UZB	Vladimir Kozak	25	0	17+3	0	0	0	5	0
30	GK	(Uzbekistan) UZB	Temur Juraev	24	0	21	0	0	0	3	0
33	GK	(Uzbekistan) UZB	Eldor Tajibaev	1	0	0	0	0	0	0+1	0
	MF	(Uzbekistan) UZB	Davlatbek Yarbekov	1	0	0+1	0	0	0	0	0
Players away on loan:
6	DF	(Uzbekistan) UZB	Murod Kholmukhamedov	5	0	3+1	0	0	0	1	0
Players who left Pakhtakor Tashkent during the season:
21	DF	(Uzbekistan) UZB	Kamoliddin Tajiev	12	0	8+1	0	0	0	3	0
25	FW	(North Macedonia) MKD	Dušan Savić	19	8	12+1	7	0	0	5+1	1

=== Goal scorers ===
Place	Position	Nation	Number	Name	Uzbek League	Uzbekistan Cup	AFC Champions League	Total
1	FW	(North Macedonia)	25	Dušan Savić	7	2	1	10
1	MF	(Uzbekistan)	28	Stanislav Andreev	3	5	2	10
3	MF	(Uzbekistan)	26	Dilshod Sharofetdinov	2	4	1	7
4	MF	(Uzbekistan)	14	Sherzod Karimov	5	0	1	6
5	MF	(Georgia (country))	7	Kakhi Makharadze	3	1	0	4
5	FW	(Uzbekistan)	9	Temurkhuja Abdukholiqov	3	0	1	4
5	MF	(Georgia (country))	11	Irakli Klimiashvili	1	3	0	4
5	MF	(Uzbekistan)	18	Sanat Shikhov	1	2	1	4
9	FW	(Uzbekistan)	10	Farhod Tadjiyev	3	0	0	3
10	MF	(Uzbekistan)	2	Egor Krimets	1	0	1	2
10				Own goal	2	0	0	2
12	DF	(Serbia)	4	Bojan Miladinović	1	0	0	1
12	FW	(Uzbekistan)	23	Alisher Azizov	1	0	0	1
12	DF	(Uzbekistan)	13	Aleksandr Kletskov	0	1	0	1
12	DF	(Uzbekistan)	29	Vladimir Kozak	0	1	0	1
				TOTALS	33	19	8	69

=== Clean sheets ===
Place	Position	Nation	Number	Name	Uzbek League	Uzbekistan Cup	AFC Champions League	Total
1	GK	(Uzbekistan)	30	Temur Juraev	13	0	0	13
1	GK	(Uzbekistan)	1	Nikita Ribkin	2	0	0	2
				TOTALS	15	3	0	18

=== Disciplinary record ===
Number	Nation	Position	Name	Uzbek League		Uzbekistan Cup		AFC Champions League		Total	
Number	Nation	Position	Name	Booked	Sent off (straight red)	Booked	Sent off (straight red)	Booked	Sent off (straight red)	Booked	Sent off (straight red)
2	(Uzbekistan)	DF	Egor Krimets	3	0	0	0	1	0	4	0
4	(Serbia)	DF	Bojan Miladinović	3	0	0	0	1	0	4	0
5	(Uzbekistan)	MF	Akbar Ismatullaev	1	0	0	0	0	0	1	0
7	(Georgia (country))	MF	Kakhi Makharadze	3	0	0	0	0	0	3	0
9	(Uzbekistan)	FW	Temurkhuja Abdukholiqov	2	0	0	0	2	0	4	0
10	(Uzbekistan)	FW	Farhod Tadjiyev	1	0	0	0	0	0	1	0
13	(Uzbekistan)	DF	Aleksandr Kletskov	1	0	0	0	0	0	1	0
14	(Uzbekistan)	MF	Sherzod Karimov	3	0	0	0	0	0	3	0
16	(Uzbekistan)	DF	Akmal Kholmurodov	6	0	0	0	1	0	7	0
18	(Uzbekistan)	MF	Sanat Shikhov	2	0	0	0	1	0	3	0
19	(Uzbekistan)	MF	Bekzod Mirkhaydarov	0	0	0	0	1	0	1	0
24	(Uzbekistan)	DF	Davron Khashimov	2	0	0	0	0	0	2	0
25	(Georgia (country))	MF	Irakli Klimiashvili	2	0	0	0	0	0	2	0
26	(Uzbekistan)	MF	Dilshod Sharofetdinov	2	0	0	0	2	0	4	0
27	(Uzbekistan)	DF	Ilhom Suyunov	5	0	0	0	2	0	7	0
28	(Uzbekistan)	MF	Stanislav Andreev	4	0	0	0	0	0	4	0
29	(Uzbekistan)	DF	Vladimir Kozak	2	0	0	0	2	0	4	0
30	(Uzbekistan)	GK	Temur Juraev	1	0	0	0	1	0	2	0
33	(Uzbekistan)	GK	Eldor Tajibaev	0	0	0	0	1	0	1	0
Players away from Pakhtakor Tashkent on loan :
6	(Uzbekistan)	DF	Murod Kholmukhamedov	1	0	0	0	0	0	1	0
Players who left Pakhtakor Tashkent during the season:
21	(Uzbekistan)	DF	Kamoliddin Tajiev	3	0	0	0	1	1	4	1
25	(North Macedonia)	FW	Dušan Savić	1	0	0	0	0	0	1	0
			TOTALS	48	0	0	0	16	1	64	1
