= 2013 Pakhtakor Tashkent FK season =

Pakhtakor Tashkent FK
2013 season
- Chairman: Samvel Babayan
- Manager: Murod Ismailov
- Uzbek League: 4th
- Uzbek Cup: Semifinal vs Nasaf
- AFC Champions League: Group stage
- Top goalscorer: League: Three Players (6); All: Temurkhuja Abdukholiqov (10)
Home colours	Away colours

The 2013 season was Pakhtakor's 22nd season in the top Uzbek League in Uzbekistan. Pakhtakor competed in the Uzbek League, Uzbek Cup and AFC Champions League tournaments.

== Squad ==
As of match played 8 November 2013

No.	Name	Nationality	Position	Date of birth (age)	Signed from	Signed in	Contract ends	Apps.	Goals
Goalkeepers
1	Nikita Ribkin	(Uzbekistan)	GK	20 January 1992 (aged 21)	Academy	2010			
12	Alexander Lobanov	(Uzbekistan)	GK	4 January 1986 (aged 27)	Jaykhun Nukus	2012	2014		
30	Temur Juraev	(Uzbekistan)	GK	12 May 1984 (aged 29)	Qizilqum Zarafshon	2004			
Defenders
4	Bojan Miladinović	(Serbia)	DF	24 April 1982 (aged 31)	Napredak Kruševac	2009			
6	Murod Kholmukhamedov	(Uzbekistan)	DF	23 December 1990 (aged 22)	Academy	2008			
23	Aleksandr Merzlyakov	(Uzbekistan)	DF	30 October 1986 (aged 27)	Shurtan Guzar	2013		29	0
24	Davron Khashimov	(Uzbekistan)	DF	24 November 1992 (aged 20)	Academy	2011			
29	Vladimir Kozak	(Uzbekistan)	DF	12 June 1993 (aged 20)	Academy	2010			
45	Maksimilian Fomin	(Uzbekistan)	DF	21 September 1993 (aged 20)	Academy	2013		1	0
Midfielders
5	Akbar Ismatullaev	(Uzbekistan)	MF	10 January 1991 (aged 22)	Academy	2009			
7	Kakhi Makharadze	(Georgia (country))	MF	20 October 1987 (aged 26)	Lokomotiv Tashkent	2011			
10	Zhora Hovhannisyan	(Armenia)	MF	16 April 1987 (aged 26)	Lokomotiv Tashkent	2013		16	3
14	Sherzod Karimov	(Uzbekistan)	MF	26 January 1989 (aged 24)	Qizilqum Zarafshon	2009			
15	Jamshid Iskanderov	(Uzbekistan)	MF	16 October 1993 (aged 20)	Dinamo Samarqand	2011			
17	Aram Babayan	(Uzbekistan)	MF	3 August 1992 (aged 21)	Academy	2012			
26	Dilshod Sharofetdinov	(Uzbekistan)	MF	15 October 1985 (aged 28)	Dinamo Samarqand	2009			
28	Stanislav Andreev	(Uzbekistan)	MF	6 May 1988 (aged 25)	Topalang Sariosiyo	2007			
34	Oybek Kilichev	(Uzbekistan)	MF	17 January 1989 (aged 24)	Andijon	2012			
36	Jaloliddin Masharipov	(Uzbekistan)	MF	1 September 1993 (aged 20)	Academy	2013		1	0
37	Abdullokh Olimov	(Uzbekistan)	MF	11 February 1993 (aged 20)	Academy	2012			
38	Abbosbek Makhstaliev	(Uzbekistan)	MF	12 January 1994 (aged 19)	Academy	2011			
39	Bakhodir Mirzarakhimov	(Uzbekistan)	MF	4 July 1993 (aged 20)	Academy	2013		0	0
	Javokhir Sokhibov	(Uzbekistan)	MF	1 March 1995 (aged 18)	Academy	2013		4	0
	Muhsinjon Ubaydullaev	(Uzbekistan)	MF	15 July 1994 (aged 19)	Academy	2013		1	0
Forwards
9	Temurkhuja Abdukholiqov	(Uzbekistan)	FW	25 September 1991 (aged 22)	Bunyodkor	2011			
11	Timur Khakimov	(Uzbekistan)	FW	23 August 1994 (aged 19)	Academy	2011			
19	Igor Sergeyev	(Uzbekistan)	FW	30 April 1993 (aged 20)	Academy	2011			
20	Anvarjon Soliev	(Uzbekistan)	FW	5 February 1978 (aged 35)	Bunyodkor	2013			
22	Abdul Aziz Yusupov	(Uzbekistan)	FW	5 January 1993 (aged 20)	Academy	2013		1	0
55	Anvar Rajabov	(Uzbekistan)	FW	23 January 1988 (aged 25)	Buriram United	2013		6	0
	Igor Rogovanov	(Uzbekistan)	FW	4 July 1995 (aged 18)	Academy	2013		3	0
Players away on loan
2	Egor Krimets	(Uzbekistan)	DF	27 January 1992 (aged 21)	Academy	2010			
3	Gulom Urunov	(Uzbekistan)	DF	7 June 1989 (aged 24)	Academy	2009			
13	Sergey Rekun	(Uzbekistan)	FW	6 February 1993 (aged 20)	Academy	2012			
21	Ildar Mamatkazin	(Uzbekistan)	DF	25 October 1988 (aged 25)	Academy	2013		5	0
23	Alisher Azizov	(Uzbekistan)	FW	14 February 1990 (aged 23)	Academy	2009			
	Eldor Tajibaev	(Uzbekistan)	GK	3 June 1986 (aged 27)	Navbahor Namangan	2009			
	Akmal Kholmurodov	(Uzbekistan)	DF	4 January 1989 (aged 24)	Navbahor Namangan	2010			
	Farrukh Shotursunov	(Uzbekistan)	FW	11 May 1992 (aged 21)	Academy	2012			
Players who left during the season
18	Sanat Shikhov	(Uzbekistan)	FW	28 December 1989 (aged 23)	Shaykhontohur	2008			
27	Ilhom Suyunov	(Uzbekistan)	DF	17 May 1983 (aged 30)	Mash'al Mubarek	2004			

== Transfers ==
=== In ===
Date	Position	Nationality	Name	From	Fee	Ref.
1 January 2013	DF	(Uzbekistan)	Ildar Mamatkazin	Andijon	Undisclosed	
1 January 2013	DF	(Uzbekistan)	Aleksandr Merzlyakov	Shurtan Guzar	Undisclosed	
1 January 2013	MF	(Armenia)	Zhora Hovhannisyan	Lokomotiv Tashkent	Undisclosed	
1 January 2013	FW	(Uzbekistan)	Anvar Rajabov	Buriram United	Undisclosed	
1 July 2013	FW	(Uzbekistan)	Anvarjon Soliev	Bunyodkor	Undisclosed	

=== Loans out ===
Start date	Position	Nationality	Name	To	End date	Ref.
1 January 2013	GK	(Uzbekistan)	Nodir Ashurmatov	Sogdiana Jizzakh	31 December 2013	
1 January 2013	GK	(Uzbekistan)	Sergey Smorodin	Andijon	31 December 2013	
1 January 2013	GK	(Uzbekistan)	Eldor Tajibaev	Qizilqum Zarafshon	30 June 2013	
1 January 2013	DF	(Uzbekistan)	Azamat Abdullaev	Qizilqum Zarafshon	30 June 2013	
1 January 2013	DF	(Uzbekistan)	Akmal Kholmurodov	Dinamo Samarqand	31 December 2013	
1 January 2013	DF	(Uzbekistan)	Egor Krimets	Beijing Guoan	31 December 2013	
1 January 2013	DF	(Uzbekistan)	Tokhir Shamshitdinov	Guliston	31 December 2013	
1 January 2013	MF	(Uzbekistan)	Akram Bakhridtinov	Navbahor Namangan	31 December 2013	
1 January 2013	MF	(Uzbekistan)	Anvar Rakhimov	Sogdiana Jizzakh	31 December 2013	
1 January 2013	MF	(Uzbekistan)	Azamat Bobojonov	Dinamo Samarqand	31 December 2013	
1 January 2013	MF	(Uzbekistan)	Nodir Kamolov	Neftchi Fergana	31 December 2013	
1 January 2013	MF	(Uzbekistan)	Sherzod Karimov	Qingdao Jonoon	31 December 2013	
1 January 2013	FW	(Uzbekistan)	Alisher Azizov	Buxoro	31 December 2013	
1 January 2013	FW	(Uzbekistan)	Ruzimboy Ahmedov	Navbahor Namangan	31 December 2013	
1 January 2013	FW	(Uzbekistan)	Timur Khakimov	Andijon	31 December 2013	
1 January 2013	FW	(Uzbekistan)	Bahriddin Vahobov	Buxoro	31 December 2013	
1 January 2013	FW	(Uzbekistan)	Farruh Shotursunov	Qizilqum Zarafshon	30 June 2013	
1 January 2013	FW	(Uzbekistan)	Bobur Doniyorov	Sherdor	31 December 2013	
1 January 2013	FW	(Uzbekistan)	Bobur Iskandarov	Zarafshon Navoi	31 December 2013	
1 July 2013	GK	(Uzbekistan)	Eldor Tajibaev	Shurtan Guzar	31 December 2013	
1 July 2013	DF	(Uzbekistan)	Azamat Abdullaev	Dinamo Samarqand	31 December 2013	
1 July 2013	DF	(Uzbekistan)	Ildar Mamatkazin	Dinamo Samarqand	31 December 2013	
1 July 2013	DF	(Uzbekistan)	Azamat Sharipov	Buxoro	31 December 2013	
1 July 2013	DF	(Uzbekistan)	Gulom Urunov	Neftchi Fergana	31 December 2013	
1 July 2013	MF	(Uzbekistan)	Islom Ismoilov	Navbahor Namangan	31 December 2013	
1 July 2013	MF	(Uzbekistan)	Oyatilla Muhiddinov	Navbahor Namangan	31 December 2013	
1 July 2013	MF	(Uzbekistan)	Davlatbek Yarbekov	Kokand 1912	31 December 2013	
1 July 2013	MF	(Uzbekistan)	Sanat Shikhov	Dinamo Samarqand	31 December 2013	
1 July 2013	FW	(Uzbekistan)	Abdurakhman Abdulhakov	Zarafshon Navoi	31 December 2013	
1 July 2013	FW	(Uzbekistan)	Abdulaziz Juraboev	Zarafshon Navoi	31 December 2013	
1 July 2013	FW	(Uzbekistan)	Sergey Rekun	Guliston	31 December 2013	
1 July 2013	FW	(Uzbekistan)	Farruh Shotursunov	Dinamo Samarqand	31 December 2013	

== Friendlies ==
10 January 2013	El Jaish	2 – 2	Pakhtakor Tashkent	Sharjah, United Arab Emirates
			Hovhannisyan; Miladinović

14 January 2013	Fujairah	3 – 2	Pakhtakor Tashkent	Sharjah, United Arab Emirates
			Sharofetdinov 51', 56'

16 January 2013	Kuban Krasnodar	1 – 0	Pakhtakor Tashkent	Sharjah, United Arab Emirates
	Bucur 64'

20 January 2013	Anzhi Makhachkala	0 – 1	Pakhtakor Tashkent	Sharjah, United Arab Emirates
			Miladinović 76'

30 January 2013	Qizilqum Zarafshon	1 – 1	Pakhtakor Tashkent	Tashkent, Uzbekistan
	Olimov 66'		Sharofetdinov 17'

5 February 2013	BATE Borisov	3 – 4	Pakhtakor Tashkent	Belek, Turkey
	Kontsevoy 55'; Kurlovich 66'; Mazalewski 81' (pen.)	Summary	Yurevich 55' (o.g.); 65'; 79'; 89'

9 February 2013	Podbeskidzie	0 – 0	Pakhtakor Tashkent	Belek, Turkey

10 February 2013	Vostok	1 – 0	Pakhtakor Tashkent	Belek, Turkey
	Niang 89'

13 February 2013	Chornomorets Odesa	1 – 1	Pakhtakor Tashkent	Belek, Turkey
15:00	Riera 74'		Sergeev 61'

15 February 2013	Diósgyőri VTK	0 – 1	Pakhtakor Tashkent	Belek, Turkey
15:00			Makharadze 6'

== Competitions ==
Pakhtakor is present in all major competitions: Uzbek League, the AFC Champions League and the Uzbek Cup.

=== Overview ===
Competition	First match	Last match	Starting round	Final position	Record							
Competition	First match	Last match	Starting round	Final position	Pld	W	D	L	GF	GA	GD	Win %
Uzbek League	3 March 2013	8 November 2013	Matchday 1	4th	26	17	3	6	45	25	+20	65.38
Uzbekistan Cup	25 June 2013	22 August 2013	Round of 32	Semifinal	3	1	1	1	7	3	+4	33.33
AFC Champions League	26 February 2013	1 May 2013	Group Stage	Group Stage	6	2	1	3	6	9	−3	33.33
Total					35	20	5	10	58	37	+21	57.14

Last updated: 24 November 2012
Source: Competitions

=== Uzbek League ===
==== League table ====
Pos	Team	Pld	W	D	L	GF	GA	GD	Pts	Qualification or relegation
2	Lokomotiv Tashkent	26	19	3	4	63	21	+42	60	2014 AFC Champions League Play-off stage (Note: Number of entrants per association for 2014 AFC Champions League can be changed.)
3	Nasaf Qarshi	26	18	4	4	64	27	+37	58	2014 AFC Champions League Play-off stage
4	Pakhtakor Tashkent	26	17	3	6	45	25	+20	54	
5	Olmaliq FK	26	11	7	8	46	43	+3	40	
6	FK Buxoro	26	10	3	13	33	44	−11	33	

Updated to match(es) played on 8 November 2013. Source: Uzbekistan Professional Football League
Rules for classification: 1) points; 2) goal difference; 3) number of goals scored.

==== Results summary ====
Overall								Home						Away					
Pld	W	D	L	GF	GA	GD	Pts	W	D	L	GF	GA	GD	W	D	L	GF	GA	GD
26	17	3	6	45	25	+20	54	10	0	3	28	11	+17	7	3	3	17	14	+3

Last updated: 8 November 2013.
Source: See Results

==== Results ====
3 March 2013 1	Pakhtakor Tashkent	2 – 0	Navbahor Namangan	Tashkent
16:00 UZT (UTC+5)	Sergeyev 20'; Hovhannisyan 37'; Kilichev (yellow card) 45+1'	Report	Sultanov (yellow card) 41'; Tairov (yellow card) 45'; Boydadaev (yellow card) 80'	Stadium: Central Stadium; Referee: Marat Ismailov

21 May 2013 2	Shurtan Guzar	1 – 2	Pakhtakor Tashkent	Gʻuzor
17:00 UZT (UTC+5)	Solomin (yellow card) 8'; Atakhanov (yellow card) 8'; Amonov (yellow card) 50'; Vostrikov (yellow card) 68'; Abibulaev 70'	Report	Kilichev 3'; Makhstaliev 20'; Miladinović (yellow card) 64'	Stadium: G'uzor Stadium; Referee: Ravshan Irmatov

17 March 2013 3	Pakhtakor Tashkent	1 – 0	Neftchi Fergana	Tashkent
17:00 UZT (UTC+5)	Khashimov (yellow card) 38' (goal) 49'	Report	Akramov (yellow card) 26'; Saidov (yellow card) 80'; Irmatov (yellow card) 87'	Stadium: Central Stadium; Referee: Olim Talibdjanov

29 March 2013 4	Metallurg Bekabad	2 – 0	Pakhtakor Tashkent	Bekabad
15:00 UZT (UTC+5)	Sulaymonov (yellow card) 32'; Yuldashev (yellow card) 45'; Karimov 59'; Vagapov 87'	Report	Kozak (yellow card) 68'	Stadium: Metallurg Bekabad Stadium; Referee: Sultan Zailobidinov

14 April 2013 5	Pakhtakor Tashkent	4 – 0	Dinamo Samarqand	Tashkent
17:00 UZT (UTC+5)	Urunov 2'; Abdukholiqov (yellow card) 39' (goal) 47'; Makharadze 49' (pen.); Hovhannisyan 57'; Kilichev (yellow card) 80'	Report	Melnychuk (yellow card) 48'	Stadium: Central Stadium; Referee: Aziz Asymov

19 April 2013 6	Pakhtakor Tashkent	1 – 2	Lokomotiv Tashkent	Tashkent
17:30 UZT (UTC+5)	Kilichev (yellow card) 19'; Makharadze 24' (yellow card) 85'	Report	Jabborov (yellow card) 12'; Kholmatov 28'; Karpenko 32'; Tukhtakhujaev (yellow card) 37'	Stadium: Central Stadium; Referee: Ravshan Irmatov

30 June 2013 12	Pakhtakor Tashkent	0 – 2	Bunyodkor	Tashkent
19:00 UZT (UTC+5)	Abdukholiqov (yellow card) 53'	Report	Zoteyev (yellow card) 60'; Miladinović 67' (o.g.); Pyshchur 75'	Stadium: Pakhtakor Stadium; Attendance: 3,941; Referee: Valentin Kovalenko

10 August 2013 15	Bunyodkor	1 – 2	Pakhtakor Tashkent	Tashkent
19:00 UZT (UTC+5)	Ibrokhimov (yellow card) 45'; Turaev 90'; Gafurov (yellow card) 90+1'	Report	Makharadze 4'; Kilichev (yellow card) 57'; Abdukholiqov 83'; Soliev (yellow card) 90+1'	Stadium: JAR Stadium; Attendance: 5,362; Referee: Marat Ismailov

=== Uzbek Cup ===
25 June 2013 Quarterfinal 1st leg	Guliston	1 – 3	Pakhtakor Tashkent	Guliston
18:00 UZT (UTC+5)	Shogulyamov 10'; Akbarov (yellow card) 30'; Khasanov (yellow card) 88'	Report	Abdukholiqov 24'; Shikhov 51'; Khashimov (yellow card) 68'; Kilichev (yellow card) 69'; Suyunov 81'; Rekun (yellow card) 86'	Stadium: Guliston Stadium; Attendance: 12,268; Referee: Sultan Zailobidinov

8 July 2013 Quarterfinal 2nd leg	Pakhtakor Tashkent	4 – 0 (7 – 1 agg.)	Guliston	Tashkent
20:00 UZT (UTC+5)	Miladinović 26'; Abdukholiqov 29', 41'; Khashimov (yellow card) 56'; Mamatkazin 87'	Report	Qurbonov (yellow card) 22' (yellow-red card) 86'; Djuraev (yellow card) 33'	Stadium: Central Stadium; Attendance: 874; Referee: Bakhtiyor Namazov

30 July 2013 Semifinal 1st leg	Pakhtakor Tashkent	0 – 0	Nasaf Qarshi	Tashkent
18:00 UZT (UTC+5)	Sharofetdinov (yellow card) 2'; Soliev (yellow card) 86'; Makharadze (yellow card) 87'	Summary		Stadium: Central Stadium; Referee: Valentin Kovalenko

22 August 2013 Semifinal 2nd leg	Nasaf Qarshi	2 – 0 (2 – 0 agg.)	Pakhtakor Tashkent	Qarshi
19:30 UZT (UTC+5)	Geworkýan 42' (pen.), 80' (pen.); Sayfiev (yellow card) 83'; Abdullayev (yellow card) 85'; Nematov (yellow card) 90+4'	Summary	Merzlyakov (yellow card) 24'; Khashimov (yellow card) 48'; Miladinović (yellow card) 52' (yellow-red card) 81'; Lobanov (yellow card) 70'; Karimov (yellow card) 77'	Stadium: Markaziy Stadium; Attendance: 10,025; Referee: Ravshan Irmatov

=== AFC Champions League ===
==== Group stage ====
Pos	Team	Pld	W	D	L	GF	GA	GD	Pts	Qualification
1	(Qatar) Lekhwiya	6	3	2	1	10	7	+3	11	Advance to knockout stage
2	(United Arab Emirates) Al-Shabab Al-Arabi	6	3	0	3	8	9	−1	9	Advance to knockout stage
3	(Saudi Arabia) Al-Ettifaq	6	2	1	3	6	5	+1	7	
4	(Uzbekistan) Pakhtakor	6	2	1	3	6	9	−3	7	

26 February 2013 1	Pakhtakor Tashkent (Uzbekistan)	1–0	(Saudi Arabia) Al-Ettifaq	Tashkent, Uzbekistan
16:00 UZT (UTC+5)	Ismatullaev (yellow card) 24'; Abdukholiqov 73'; Sharofetdinov (yellow card) 78'; Lobanov (yellow card) 87'	Report	Kano (yellow card) 21'; Al-Amri (yellow card) 27'; Al-Shehri (yellow card) 50' (penalty missed) 62'; Al-Sulim (yellow card) 77'	Stadium: Central Stadium; Attendance: 10,000; Referee: Kim Jong-hyeok (South Korea)

12 March 2013 2	Al-Shabab Al-Arabi (United Arab Emirates)	0–1	(Uzbekistan) Pakhtakor Tashkent	Dubai, United Arab Emirates
20:15 UZT (UTC+5)		Report	Merzlyakov (yellow card) 46'; Iskanderov 85'; Urunov (yellow card) 90+2'	Stadium: Maktoum bin Rashid Al Maktoum Stadium; Attendance: 815; Referee: Ali Abdulnabi (Bahrain)

3 April 2013 3	Lekhwiya (Qatar)	3–1	(Uzbekistan) Pakhtakor Tashkent	Doha, Qatar
20:15 UZT (UTC+5)	Dia 21'; Soria 84', 90+1'	Report	Urunov 40'	Stadium: Abdullah bin Khalifa Stadium; Attendance: 3,414; Referee: Masaaki Toma (Japan)

9 April 2013 4	Pakhtakor Tashkent (Uzbekistan)	2–2	(Qatar) Lekhwiya	Tashkent, Uzbekistan
16:00 UZT (UTC+5)	Urunov 26'; Merzlyakov (yellow card) 39'; Traoré 56' (o.g.); Makharadze (yellow card) 65'; Khashimov (yellow card) 74'	Report	Soria 1'; Traoré (yellow card) 47'; Msakni 67'; Nam (yellow card) 81'; Shehab (yellow card) 87'	Stadium: Central Stadium; Attendance: 8,900; Referee: Tan Hai (China PR)

24 April 2013 5	Al-Ettifaq (Saudi Arabia)	2–0	(Uzbekistan) Pakhtakor Tashkent	Dammam, Saudi Arabia
22:10 UZT (UTC+5)	Al-Shehri 24'; Al-Jamaan 41' (yellow card) 90+4'	Report	Sergeyev (yellow card) 84'	Stadium: Prince Mohamed bin Fahd Stadium; Attendance: 883; Referee: Hiroyoshi Takayama (Japan)

1 May 2013 6	Pakhtakor Tashkent (Uzbekistan)	1–2	(United Arab Emirates) Al-Shabab Al-Arabi	Tashkent, Uzbekistan
21:00 UZT (UTC+5)	Makharadze 19' (pen.); Abdukholiqov (yellow card) 54'; Kozak (yellow card) 56'; Merzlyakov (yellow card) 72'	Report	Dhahi 1'; Qassem (yellow card) 45+2'; Makharadze 64' (o.g.); Abbas (yellow card) 66'; Marzooq (red card) 84'; Saqer (yellow card) 84'; Ciel (yellow card) 90'	Stadium: Central Stadium; Attendance: 8,556; Referee: Mohsen Torky (Iran)

== Squad statistics ==
As of match played 8 November 2013

=== Appearances and goals ===
No.	Pos	Nat	Player	Total		Uzbek League		Uzbek Cup		AFC Champions League	
No.	Pos	Nat	Player	Apps	Goals	Apps	Goals	Apps	Goals	Apps	Goals
4	DF	(Serbia) SRB	Bojan Miladinović	22	1	17+1	0	4	1	0	0
5	MF	(Uzbekistan) UZB	Akbar Ismatullaev	33	0	22+2	0	3	0	6	0
6	DF	(Uzbekistan) UZB	Murod Kholmukhamedov	15	0	8+2	0	2	0	0+3	0
7	MF	(Georgia (country)) GEO	Kakhi Makharadze	32	7	24	6	2	0	6	1
9	FW	(Uzbekistan) UZB	Temurkhuja Abdukholiqov	29	10	13+6	6	4	3	2+4	1
10	MF	(Armenia) ARM	Zhora Hovhannisyan	16	3	10+2	3	0	0	4	0
12	GK	(Uzbekistan) UZB	Aleksandr Lobanov	34	0	25	0	4	0	5	0
14	MF	(Uzbekistan) UZB	Sherzod Karimov	12	3	6+3	3	1+1	0	1	0
15	MF	(Uzbekistan) UZB	Jamshid Iskanderov	28	2	17+4	1	0+2	0	5	1
19	FW	(Uzbekistan) UZB	Igor Sergeyev	28	5	16+4	5	1+1	0	5+1	0
20	FW	(Uzbekistan) UZB	Anvarjon Soliev	12	3	1+9	3	0+2	0	0	0
22	FW	(Uzbekistan) UZB	Abdul Aziz Yusupov	1	0	1	0	0	0	0	0
23	MF	(Uzbekistan) UZB	Aleksandr Merzlyakov	29	0	20	0	4	0	5	0
24	DF	(Uzbekistan) UZB	Davron Khashimov	33	3	24	3	3	0	6	0
26	MF	(Uzbekistan) UZB	Dilshod Sharofetdinov	23	6	13+4	6	4	0	2	0
28	MF	(Uzbekistan) UZB	Stanislav Andreev	10	1	8+1	1	0	0	1	0
29	DF	(Uzbekistan) UZB	Vladimir Kozak	29	2	21	2	2	0	6	0
30	GK	(Uzbekistan) UZB	Temur Juraev	2	0	1	0	0	0	1	0
34	MF	(Uzbekistan) UZB	Oybek Kilichev	33	4	19+4	4	4	0	5+1	0
36	MF	(Uzbekistan) UZB	Jaloliddin Masharipov	1	0	0	0	1	0	0	0
37	MF	(Uzbekistan) UZB	Abdulloh Olimov	7	0	1+5	0	1	0	0	0
38	MF	(Uzbekistan) UZB	Abbosbek Makhstaliev	15	1	4+5	1	0+1	0	1+4	0
45	DF	(Uzbekistan) UZB	Maksimilian Fomin	1	0	0	0	1	0	0	0
55	FW	(Uzbekistan) UZB	Anvar Rajabov	6	0	0+6	0	0	0	0	0
	MF	(Uzbekistan) UZB	Javokhir Sokhibov	4	0	0+2	0	1+1	0	0	0
	MF	(Uzbekistan) UZB	Muhsinjon Ubaydullaev	1	0	0+1	0	0	0	0	0
	FW	(Uzbekistan) UZB	Igor Rogovanov	3	0	0+3	0	0	0	0	0
Players away on loan:
3	DF	(Uzbekistan) UZB	Gulom Urunov	16	3	7+3	1	1	0	4+1	2
13	FW	(Uzbekistan) UZB	Sergey Rekun	4	0	0+2	0	0+2	0	0	0
18	MF	(Uzbekistan) UZB	Sanat Shikhov	8	1	0+4	0	1	1	1+2	0
21	DF	(Uzbekistan) UZB	Ildar Mamatkazin	5	0	2+2	0	0+1	0	0	0
Players who left Pakhtakor Tashkent during the season:
27	DF	(Uzbekistan) UZB	Ilhom Suyunov	6	1	4	0	0+1	1	0+1	0

=== Goal scorers ===
Place	Position	Nation	Number	Name	Uzbek League	Uzbekistan Cup	AFC Champions League	Total
1	FW	(Uzbekistan)	9	Temurkhuja Abdukholiqov	6	3	1	10
2	MF	(Georgia (country))	7	Kakhi Makharadze	6	0	1	7
3	MF	(Uzbekistan)	26	Dilshod Sharofetdinov	6	0	0	6
4	FW	(Uzbekistan)	19	Igor Sergeyev	5	0	0	5
5	MF	(Uzbekistan)	34	Oybek Kilichev	4	0	0	4
6	MF	(Armenia)	10	Zhora Hovhannisyan	3	0	0	3
6	MF	(Uzbekistan)	14	Sherzod Karimov	3	0	0	3
6	DF	(Uzbekistan)	24	Davron Khashimov	3	0	0	3
6	FW	(Uzbekistan)	20	Anvarjon Soliev	3	0	0	3
6	DF	(Uzbekistan)	3	Gulom Urunov	1	0	2	3
11	DF	(Uzbekistan)	29	Vladimir Kozak	2	0	0	2
11	MF	(Uzbekistan)	15	Jamshid Iskanderov	1	0	1	2
13	MF	(Uzbekistan)	28	Stanislav Andreev	1	0	0	1
13	MF	(Uzbekistan)	38	Abbosbek Makhstaliev	1	0	0	1
13	DF	(Serbia)	4	Bojan Miladinović	0	1	0	1
13	DF	(Uzbekistan)	21	Ildar Mamatkazin	0	1	0	1
13	MF	(Uzbekistan)	18	Sanat Shikhov	0	1	0	1
13	DF	(Uzbekistan)	27	Ilhom Suyunov	0	1	0	1
				TOTALS	45	7	5	57

=== Clean sheets ===
Place	Position	Nation	Number	Name	Uzbek League	Uzbekistan Cup	AFC Champions League	Total
1	GK	(Uzbekistan)	12	Aleksandr Lobanov	10	2	2	14
				TOTALS	10	2	2	14

=== Disciplinary record ===
Number	Nation	Position	Name	Uzbek League		Uzbekistan Cup		AFC Champions League		Total	
Number	Nation	Position	Name	Yellow card	Red card	Yellow card	Red card	Yellow card	Red card	Yellow card	Red card
4	(Serbia)	DF	Bojan Miladinović	3	0	2	1	0	0	5	1
5	(Uzbekistan)	DF	Akbar Ismatullaev	0	0	0	0	1	0	1	0
6	(Uzbekistan)	DF	Murod Kholmukhamedov	1	1	0	0	0	0	1	1
7	(Georgia (country))	MF	Kakhi Makharadze	5	0	1	0	1	0	7	0
9	(Uzbekistan)	FW	Temurkhuja Abdukholiqov	4	1	0	0	1	0	5	1
10	(Armenia)	MF	Zhora Hovhannisyan	1	0	0	0	0	0	1	0
12	(Uzbekistan)	GK	Aleksandr Lobanov	1	0	1	0	1	0	3	0
14	(Uzbekistan)	MF	Sherzod Karimov	3	0	1	0	0	0	4	0
19	(Uzbekistan)	FW	Igor Sergeyev	0	0	0	0	1	0	1	0
20	(Uzbekistan)	FW	Anvarjon Soliev	1	0	1	0	0	0	2	0
23	(Uzbekistan)	DF	Aleksandr Merzlyakov	1	0	1	0	3	0	5	0
24	(Uzbekistan)	DF	Davron Khashimov	6	0	3	0	1	0	10	0
26	(Uzbekistan)	MF	Dilshod Sharofetdinov	1	0	1	0	1	0	3	0
29	(Uzbekistan)	DF	Vladimir Kozak	2	0	0	0	1	0	3	0
34	(Uzbekistan)	MF	Oybek Kilichev	10	0	1	0	0	0	11	0
38	(Uzbekistan)	MF	Abbosbek Makhstaliev	2	0	0	0	0	0	2	0
Players away from Pakhtakor Tashkent on loan :
3	(Uzbekistan)	DF	Gulom Urunov	0	0	0	0	1	0	1	0
13	(Uzbekistan)	FW	Sergey Rekun	0	0	1	0	0	0	1	0
Players who left Pakhtakor Tashkent during the season:
			TOTALS	41	2	13	1	12	0	66	3
