= 2011 Uzbekistan Cup final =

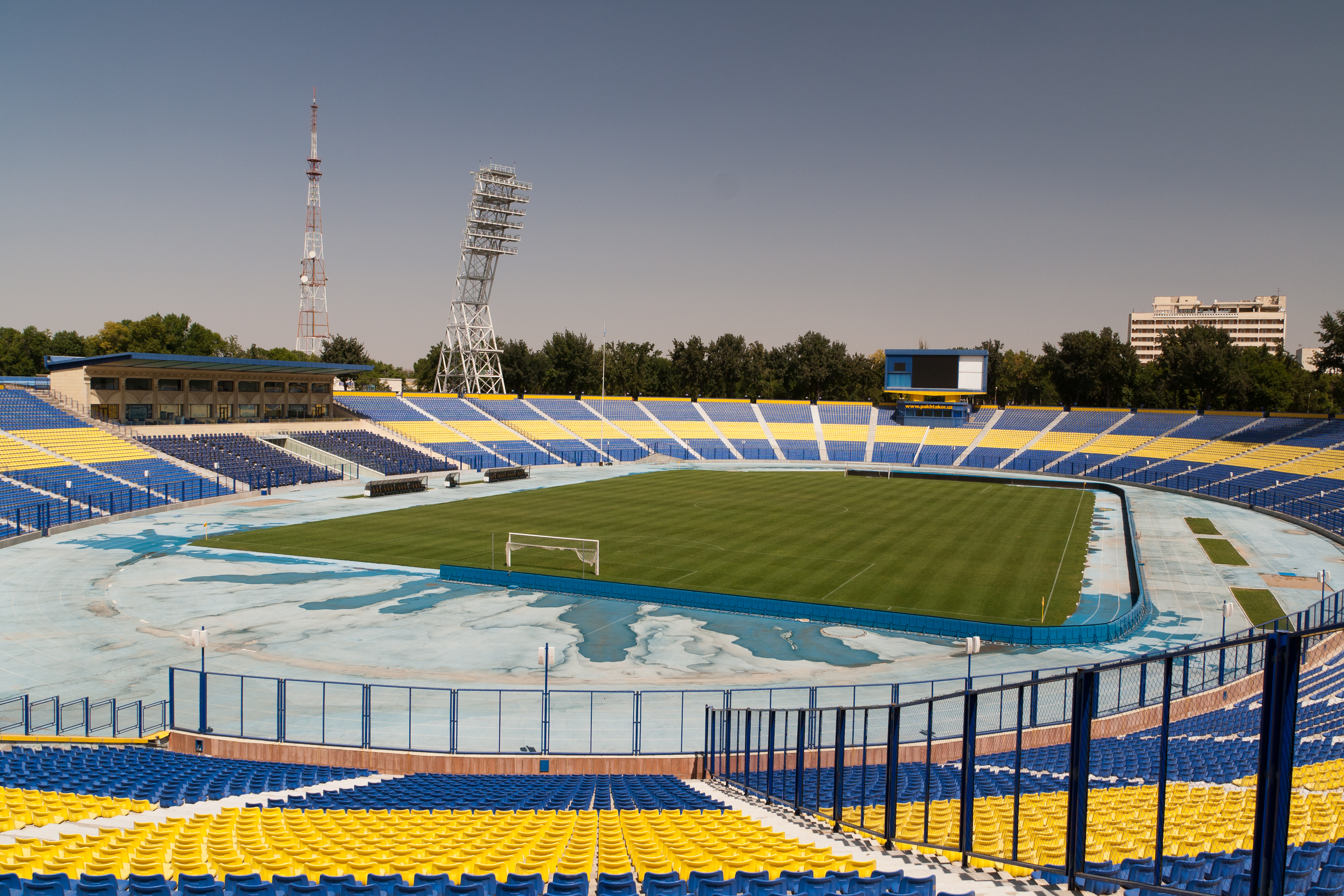
- Event: 2011 Uzbekistan Cup
FC Pakhtakor	Nasaf Qarshi
3	1
- Date: 13 November 2011
- Venue: Pakhtakor Markaziy Stadium, Tashkent
- Man of the Match: Irakli Klimiashvili (FC Pakhtakor)
- Referee: Ravshan Irmatov
- Weather: Sunny; 14 °C (57 °F)

The 2011 Uzbekistan Cup final was the final match of the 2011 Uzbekistan Cup, the 19th season of the Uzbek Cup, a football competition for the 36 teams in the Uzbek League and Uzbek League Division One. The match was contested by FC Pakhtakor and Nasaf Qarshi, at Pakhtakor Markaziy Stadium in Tashkent, on November 13, 2011.

== Road to the final ==
FC Pakhtakor		Round	Nasaf Qarshi
Opponent	Result	2011 Uzbekistan Cup	Opponent	Result
FC Spartak Tashkent	5–0	Round of 32	NBU Osiyo Tashkent	3–0
FK Andijan	3–1, 4–1	Round of 16	Metallurg Bekabad	1–0, 4–0
FK Neftchi	1–0, 2–1	Quarterfinals	Mash'al Mubarek	2–0, 1–0
FC Shurtan Guzar	0–0, 1–1	Semifinals	FC Bunyodkor	1–0, 0–1 (4-3 pen)

== Match ==
13 November 2011
15:00 UTC+05:00

FC Pakhtakor	3–1	Nasaf Qarshi
Klimiashvili 5'; Kletskov 29'; Klimiashvili 80'	Report	90+2' Jiyamuradov

Pakhtakor Markaziy Stadium, Tashkent
Attendance: 12,005
Referee: Ravshan Irmatov

Pakhtakor	Nasaf

FC Pakhtakor:
GK	30	(Uzbekistan) Temur Juraev(c)
DF	2	(Uzbekistan) Egor Krimets
DF	5	(Uzbekistan) Akbar Ismatullaev
DF	13	(Uzbekistan) Aleksandr Kletskov
DF	25	(Uzbekistan) Davron Khashimov	(yellow card) 48'
MF	7	(Georgia (country)) Kakhi Makharadze
MF	9	(Uzbekistan) Temurkhuja Abdukholiqov		(substituted off) 64'
MF	14	(Uzbekistan) Sherzod Karimov		(substituted off) 86'
MF	25	(Georgia (country)) Irakli Klimiashvili		(substituted off) 83'
MF	26	(Uzbekistan) Dilshod Sharofetdinov
MF	28	(Uzbekistan) Stanislav Andreev
Substitutes:
GK	33	(Uzbekistan) Eldor Tadjibaev
DF	3	(Uzbekistan) Gulom Urunov
DF	16	(Uzbekistan) Akmal Kholmurodov
DF	29	(Uzbekistan) Vladimir Kozak	(yellow card) 89'	(substituted in) 64'
MF	8	(Uzbekistan) Abbosbek Makhstaliev		(substituted in) 86'
FW	21	(Uzbekistan) Timur Khakimov		(substituted in) 83'
FW	23	(Uzbekistan) Alisher Azizov
Manager:
(Uzbekistan) Murod Ismoilov

NASAF QARSHI:
GK	30	(Ukraine) Dmytro Kozachenko
DF	4	(Uzbekistan) Maksud Karimov
DF	5	(Uzbekistan) Botir Karaev		(substituted off) 69'
DF	34	(Serbia) Bojan Mališić	(yellow card) 28'
MF	7	(Uzbekistan) Jahongir Jiyamuradov	(yellow card) 64'
MF	8	(Latvia) Andrejs Perepļotkins
MF	13	(Uzbekistan) Lutfulla Turaev
MF	17	(Turkmenistan) Artur Gevorkyan	(yellow card) 50'	(substituted off) 77'
MF	20	(Uzbekistan) Erkin Baydullaev
FW	9	(Uzbekistan) Ilkhom Shomurodov		(substituted off) 67'
FW	19	(Montenegro) Ivan Bošković	(yellow card) 18'
Substitutions:
GK	42	(Uzbekistan) Murod Zukhurov
DF	16	(Uzbekistan) Artyom Filiposyan		(substituted in) 69'
MF	27	(Uzbekistan) Ilhom Yunusov
MF	29	(Uzbekistan) Akhrol Risqullaev
MF	48	(Uzbekistan) Mirzakamol Kamalov
FW	10	(Uzbekistan) Kenja Turaev		(substituted in) 77'
FW	11	(Uzbekistan) Nosirbek Otakuziev		(substituted in) 67'
Manager:
(Ukraine) Anatoliy Demyanenko

Man of the Match:
Irakli Klimiashvili ( (Georgia (country)) )

Assistant referees:
Abdukhamidullo Rasulov
Jakhongir Saidov
Fourth official:
Bakhtiyor Namozov
