= 2011 Uzbekistan Cup =

O'zbekiston Kubogi 2011
Tournament details
- Country: Uzbekistan
- Teams: 36

Final positions
- Champions: FC Pakhtakor
- Runners-up: Nasaf Qarshi

The 2011 Uzbekistan Cup was the 19th season of the annual Uzbek football Cup competition. The competition started on April 17, 2011, and ended on November 13, 2011, with the final that was held at the Pakhtakor Markaziy Stadium in Tashkent. Bunyodkor were the defending champions.

The cup winner were guaranteed a place in the 2012 AFC Champions League.

== Calendar ==
| Round | Date | Fixtures | Clubs | Notes |
|---|---|---|---|---|
| First round | 17 April 2011 | 2 | 36 → 32 | |
| Round of 32 | 29–30 April 2011 | 16 | 32 → 16 | Clubs participating in Uzbek League and Division One gain entry. |
| Round of 16 | 6–7 May 2011 | 8 | 16 → 8 | |
| Round of 16 | 24–25, 27 June 2011 | 8 | 16 → 8 | |
| Quarterfinals | 28 June, 2 July, 2 August 2011 | 4 | 8 → 4 | |
| Quarterfinals | 17 August 2011 | 4 | 8 → 4 | |
| Semifinals | 2 August, 28 September 2011 | 2 | 4 → 2 | |
| Semifinals | 17 August, 18 October 2011 | 2 | 4 → 2 | |
| Final | 13 November 2011 | 1 | 2 → 1 | |

== First round ==
| Home team | Score | Away team |
|---|---|---|
| FC Erkurgan | 1-0 | Registon Samarkand |
| FK Jomboy | 0-1 | FK Yangiyer |

== Bracket ==
Round of 32; April 29/30, 2011
FK Khiva | 1
Bunyodkor | 3
Erkurgan | 1
Olmaliq FK | 0
Jaykhun Nukus | 1
Sogdiana Jizzakh | 2
FK Guliston | 2
Xorazm FK Urganch | 0
FK Yangiyer | 0
Mash'al Mubarek | 1
Dynamo Ghallakor | 2
Lokomotiv Tashkent | 5
Oqtepa | 0
Metallurg Bekabad | 2
NBU Osiyo | 0
Nasaf Qarshi | 3
FC Spartak Tashkent | 0
FC Pakhtakor | 5
Shurchi Lochin | 0
FK Andijan | 1
Mash'al Akademiya | 1
FK Neftchi | 2
Nasaf-2 Qarshi | 0
Qizilqum Zarafshon | 4
Imkon Oltiariq | 2
FK Buxoro | 1
FK Kosonsoy | 1
Dynamo Samarkand | 4
Chust-Pakhtakor | 0
Navbahor Namangan | 1
Zarafshan NZZ | 1
Shurtan Guzar | 4

Round of 16; May 6/7, 2011; June 24/25,27 2011
Bunyodkor | 5 | 1 | 6
Erkurgan | 0 | 1 | 1
Sogdiana Jizzakh | 3 | 2 | 5
FK Guliston | 0 | 4 | 4
Mash'al Mubarek | 2 | 0 | 2
Lokomotiv Tashkent | 1 | 0 | 1
Metallurg Bekabad | 0 | 0 | 0
Nasaf Qarshi | 1 | 4 | 5
Pakhtakor | 3 | 4 | 7
FK Andijan | 1 | 1 | 2
FK Neftchi | 3 | 2 | 5
Qizilqum Zarafshon | 0 | 2 | 2
Imkon Oltiariq | 1 | 1 | 2
Dynamo Samarkand | 0 | 3 | 3
Navbahor Namangan | 1 | 0 | 1
Shurtan Guzar | 2 | 3 | 5

Quarterfinals; June 28, 2011; July 2, 2011; August 2,17, 2011
Bunyodkor | 3 | 2 | 5
Sogdiana Jizzakh | 1 | 0 | 1
Mash'al Mubarek | 0 | 0 | 0
Nasaf Qarshi | 2 | 1 | 3
Pakhtakor | 1 | 2 | 3
FK Neftchi | 0 | 1 | 1
Dynamo Samarkand | 0 | 3 | 3
FC Shurtan Guzar | 4 | 2 | 6

Semifinals; August 2, 17, 2011; September 28, 2011; October 18, 2011
Bunyodkor | 1 | 0 | 1
Nasaf Qarshi | 0 | 1 | 1
Pakhtakor | 1 | 0 | 1
Shurtan Guzar | 1 | 0 | 1

Final; 13 November 2011
Nasaf Qarshi | 1
Pakhtakor | 3

== Round of 32 ==
The draw for the Round of 32 was held on 24 February 2011 at Uzbek Football Federation office in Tashkent.

The one leg matches were played on 29 and 30 April.

| Team 1 | Score | Team 2 |
|---|---|---|
| FK Khiva | 1-3 | Bunyodkor |
| FC Erkurgan | 1-0 | Olmaliq FK |
| Jaykhun Nukus | 1-2 | Sogdiana Jizzakh |
| FK Guliston | 2-0 | Xorazm FK Urganch |
| FK Yangiyer | 0-1 | Mash'al Mubarek |
| Dynamo Ghallakor | 2-5 | Lokomotiv Tashkent |
| Oqtepa | 0-2 | Metallurg Bekabad |
| NBU Osiyo | 0-3 | Nasaf Qarshi |
| FC Spartak Tashkent | 0-5 | Pakhtakor |
| Shurchi Lochin | 0-1 | FK Andijan |
| Mash'al Akademiya | 1-2 | FK Neftchi |
| Nasaf-2 Qarshi | 0-4 | Qizilqum Zarafshon |
| Imkon Oltiariq | 2-1 | FK Buxoro |
| FK Kosonsoy | 1-4 | Dynamo Samarkand |
| Chust-Pakhtakor | 0-1 | Navbahor Namangan |
| Zarafshan NCZ | 1-4 | Shurtan Guzar |

== Round of 16 ==
First leg matches were played on 6–7, 24 May and 4 June. Second leg matches were played on 24, 25 and 27 June. Match between FC Erkurgan Koson and Bunyodkor was played on 6 June 2011 with 1:1 draw.

| Team 1 | Agg. | Team 2 | 1st leg | 2nd leg |
|---|---|---|---|---|
| Bunyodkor | 6-1 | FC Erkurgan Koson | 5-0 | 1-1 |
| Sogdiana Jizzakh | 5-4 | FK Guliston | 3-0 | 2-4 |
| Mash'al Mubarek | 2-1 | Lokomotiv Tashkent | 2-1 | 0-0 |
| Metallurg Bekabad | 0-5 | Nasaf Qarshi | 0-1 | 0-4 |
| Pakhtakor | 7-2 | FK Andijan | 3-1 | 4-1 |
| FK Neftchi | 5-2 | Qizilqum Zarafshon | 3-0 | 2-2 |
| Imkon Oltiariq | 2-3 | Dynamo Samarkand | 1-0 | 1-3 |
| Navbahor Namangan | 1-5 | Shurtan Guzar | 1-2 | 0-3 |

== Quarter-final ==
| Team 1 | Agg. | Team 2 | 1st leg | 2nd leg |
|---|---|---|---|---|
| Bunyodkor | 5-1 | Sogdiana Jizzakh | 3-1 | 2-0 |
| Mash'al Mubarek | 0-3 | Nasaf Qarshi | 0-2 | 0-1 |
| Pakhtakor | 3-1 | FK Neftchi | 1-0 | 2-1 |
| Dynamo Samarkand | 3-6 | Shurtan Guzar | 0-4 | 3-2 |

=== First leg ===
| 28 June 2011 | Sogdiana Jizzakh | 1 - 3 | Bunyodkor | Markaziy Stadium, Jizzakh |
| | Sobir Khamidov 47' | | 36' A.Rakhimov; 56' Mandzukas; 58' Mandzukas | Referee: Viktor Serazetdinov |

| 28 June 2011 | Mash'al Mubarek | 0 - 2 | Nasaf Qarshi | Bahrom Vafoev Stadium, Muborak |
| | D.Vaniev (yellow card) 36'; B.Qodirqulov (yellow card) 45'; B.Sapargaliev (yellow card) 56' | | 26' Perepļotkins; (yellow card) 78' Perepļotkins; 85' Shukhrat Mirkholdirshoev | Attendance: 2115; Referee: Valentin Kovalenko |

| 2 August 2011 | FK Neftchi Farg'ona | 0 - 1 | Pakhtakor | Farg'ona |
| | I.Akramov (yellow card) 45' | | 45'pen Andreev; (yellow card) 68' F.Tojiyev; (yellow card) 90+1' I.Suynov | Referee: V.Kovalenko |

| 2 August 2011 | Shurtan Guzar | 4 - 0 | Dynamo Samarkand | G‘uzor |
| | I.Taran (yellow card) 10'; Erkinov 18'; Erkinov 20'; I.Taran 50'; Odibe] 66' | | | Referee: V.Agishev |

=== Second leg ===
| 2 July 2011 | Bunyodkor | 2 - 0 | Sogdiana Jizzakh | JAR Stadium, Tashkent |
| | Ibragimov 30'; S.Juraev (yellow card) 53'; Trifunovic 58' | | (yellow card) 55' Klikunov; (yellow card) 59' Niyozov | Attendance: 2131; Referee: V.Zeytlin |

| 2 July 2011 | Nasaf Qarshi | 1 - 0 | Mash'al Mubarek | Qarshi Stadium, Qarshi |
| | Shomurodov 23' | | (yellow card) 45' J.Abdumuminov | Attendance: 3233; Referee: Vladimir Agishev |

| 17 August 2011 | Pakhtakor | 2 - 1 | FK Neftchi Farg'ona | Tashkent |
| 19:00 | Sharofetdinov 25' (pen.); Makharadze 43' | | 41' Gayrat Jumaev | Referee: V.Serazetdinov |

| 17 August 2011 | Dynamo Samarkand | 3 - 2 | Shurtan Guzar | Samarkand |
| | Uchkun Kubilov 38'; Viktor Klishin 83'; Ilyos Pardaev 87' | | 32' Emmanuel Odibe; 58' Abbos Amonov | Referee: S.Zaylobiddinov |

== Semifinal ==
| Team 1 | Agg. | Team 2 | 1st leg | 2nd leg |
|---|---|---|---|---|
| Bunyodkor | 1-1 (3-4 pen) | Nasaf Qarshi | 1-0 | 0-1 |
| Shurtan Guzar | 1-1 | Pakhtakor | 1-1 | 0-0 |

=== First leg ===
| 2 August 2011 | Bunyodkor | 1 – 0 | Nasaf | Tashkent |
| 20:00 UZT (UTC+5) | I.Inomov (yellow card) 3'; A.Shorakhmedov (yellow card) 16'; Trifunovic 74' | | (yellow card) 40' L.Turaev | Stadium: JAR Stadium; Referee: Rustam Saidov |

| 28 September 2011 | Shurtan Guzar | 1 – 1 | Pakhtakor | Gʻuzor |
| 17:00 UZT (UTC+5) | Taran (yellow card) 54'; Erkinov (yellow card) 71'; Amonov 74' | Report | Klimiashvili 52' | Stadium: G'uzor Stadium; Attendance: 5,680; Referee: Vadim Agishev |

=== Second leg ===
| 17 August 2011 | Nasaf | 1 – 0 (4–3 p) | Bunyodkor | Qarshi |
| | Gevorkyan 90+4' (pen.) | | | Stadium: Markaziy Stadium; Attendance: 12,429; Referee: Valentin Kovalenko |
| | Penalties |
| | Bošković (penalty missed); Sh.Mirkholdirshoev (penalty scored); J.Djiyamurodov (penalty scored); I.Shomurodov (penalty scored); Gevorkyan (penalty scored) | | (penalty missed) Inomov; (penalty scored) Milosavljević; (penalty missed) Gafurov; (penalty scored) Đorđević; (penalty scored) Rajabov |

| 18 October 2011 | Pakhtakor Tashkent | 0 – 0 (1 – 1 agg.) | Shurtan Guzar | Tashkent |
| 17:00 UZT (UTC+5) | Klimiashvili (yellow card) 84' | Report | Vujović (yellow card) 46'; Merzlyakov (yellow card) 76' | Stadium: Central Stadium; Referee: Viktor Serazetdinov |

== Final ==
| 13 November 2011 | Pakhtakor Tashkent | 3–1 | Nasaf | Tashkent |
| 15:00 UZT (UTC+5) | Klimiashvili 5'; Klezkov 29'; Klimiashvili 80' | | 90+2' Jiyamurodov | Stadium: Central Stadium; Referee: Ravshan Irmatov |
