= Roman Romanchuk =

Roman Romanchuk may refer to:

- Roman Romanchuk (boxer) (1979–2016), Russian boxer
- Roman Romanchuk (footballer) (born 1986), Ukrainian footballer
