= Urunov =

Urunov is a surname. Notable people with the surname include:

- Gulom Urunov (born 1989), Uzbek footballer
- Oston Urunov (born 2000), Uzbek footballer
