= Malkhaz Makharadze =

Georgian footballer (1963–2024)

- Makharadze (R) captaining the team in UEFA Cup game against Celtic in 1995

Personal information
- Date of birth: 2 March 1963
- Place of birth: Batumi, Adjarian ASSR, Georgian SSR, USSR
- Date of death: 20 November 2024 (aged 61)
- Height: 1.80 m (5 ft 11 in)
- Positions: Defender; midfielder

Senior career*
Years	Team	Apps	(Gls)
1982–1986	Dinamo Tbilisi	106	(7)
1987	Guria	18	(0)
1988–1999	Dinamo Batumi	379	(16)
Total		503	(23)
- * Club domestic league appearances and goals

Malkhaz Маkharadze (Georgian: მალხაზ მახარაძე; 2 March 1963 – 20 November 2024) was a Georgian professional footballer who played as a defender and midfielder. He is regarded as a Dinamo Batumi legend and one of the distinguished Georgian footballers.

== Career ==
Makharadze started his career in 1982 at Dinamo Tbilisi, scoring one goal in 19 matches for its reserve team. On 20 July 1984, he made a debut in the Soviet Top League in a 1–1 draw against Dinamo Minsk, when he came off the bench in the 88th minute.

In his final fifth season at Dinamo, Makharadze played in an away game against Dnipro on 21 November 1986, when his team suffered a 3–2 defeat.

The next year Makharadze joined Guria who had just earned their historic promotion to the top tier. In 1988, he moved to his hometown 2nd division club Dinamo Batumi.

Following the creation of an independent Georgian championship in 1990, Makharadze not only retained his place at Dinamo, one of the strongest Umaglesi Liga clubs in the mid-1990s, but also captained it. Apart from winning the national cup, he wore the armband during some memorable international matches, such as a UEFA Cup Winners Cup game against Celtic. On 28 August 1997, Makharadze scored his only goal in UEFA competitions, extending Dinamo's lead against Ararat, but due to a technical loss in the 1st leg for fielding an eligible player, the team failed to overcome a three-goal deficit. In total, he took part in eleven matches under UEFA's auspices.

Makharadze announced his retirement in 1999.

== Post-playing career ==
In August 2013, Makharadze was appointed sports director at Dinamo Batumi.

== Personal life and death ==
Both of his sons Kakha Makharadze and Boris Makharadze were professional football players who retired in the early 2020s.

Makharadze died on 20 November 2024, at the age of 61.

== Honours ==
Dinamo Batumi

- Georgian Cup: 1997–98; runner-up 1992–93, 1994–95, 1995–96, 1996–97
- Umaglesi Liga runner-up 1997–98; third place 1996–97
