= Jamshid Iskanderov =

Uzbek footballer (born 1993)

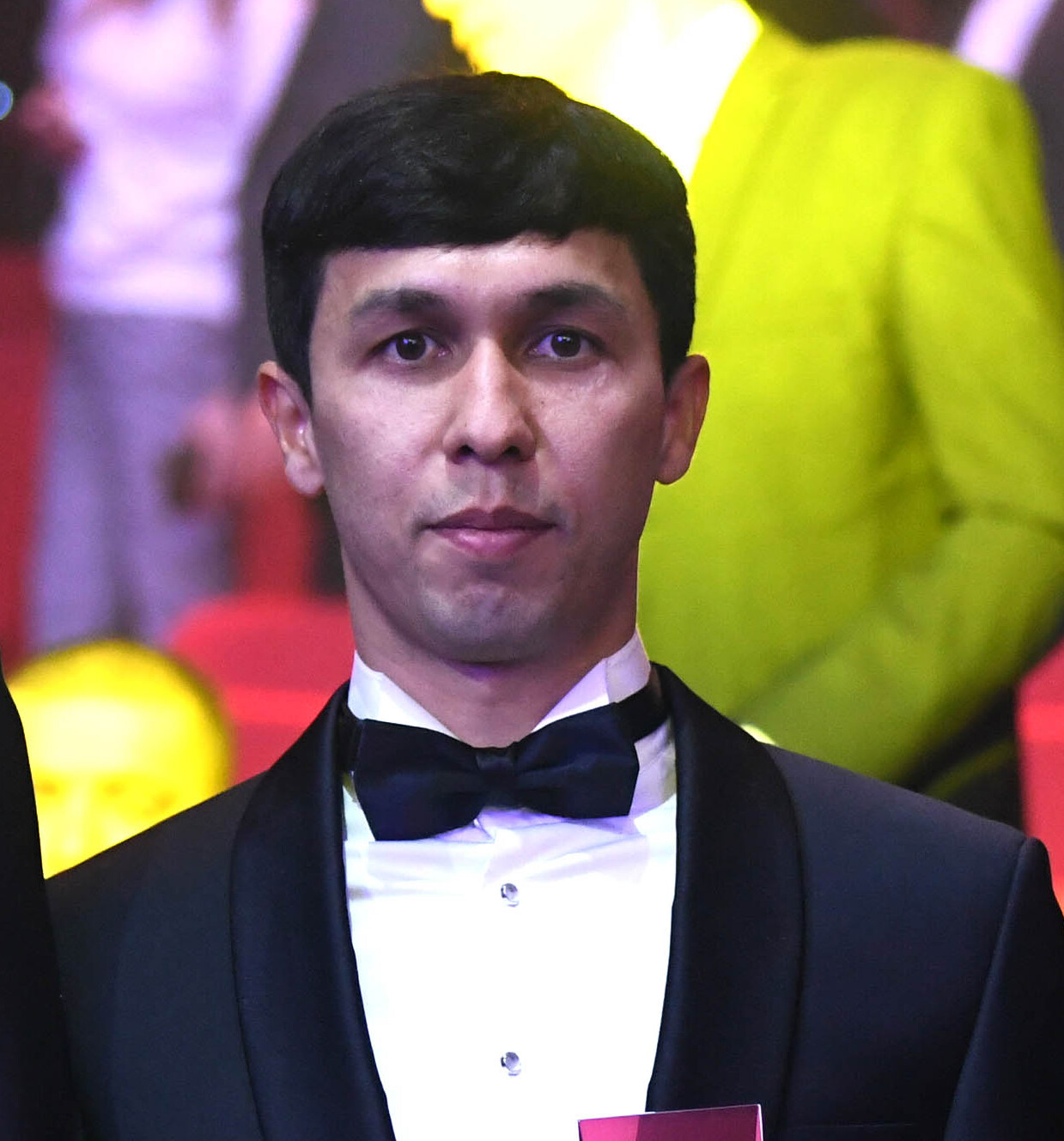

Personal information
- Full name: Jamshid Mahmudovich Iskanderov
- Date of birth: 16 October 1993 (age 33)
- Place of birth: Urganch, Uzbekistan
- Height: 1.68 m (5 ft 6 in)
- Position: Midfielder

Team information
- Current team: Neftchi Fergana
- Number: 10

Youth career
- 2009–2012: Pakhtakor Tashkent

Senior career*
Years	Team	Apps	(Gls)
2011	Dinamo Samarqand	2	(0)
2012–2018	Pakhtakor Tashkent	126	(19)
2019	Lokomotiv Tashkent	26	(6)
2020–2021	Seongnam	46	(2)
2022–2024	Navbahor Namangan	77	(18)
2025–	Neftchi Fergana	43	(11)

International career^{‡}
2010–2011	Uzbekistan U19	7	(1)
2010–2013	Uzbekistan U20	3	(1)
2012	Uzbekistan U23	3	(1)
2013–	Uzbekistan	39	(4)
Medal record
Men's football
Representing Uzbekistan
FIFA Series
Winner	2026 Uzbekistan
CAFA Nations Cup
Runner-up	2023 Kyrgyzstan–Uzbekistan	Team
Winner	2025 Tajikistan–Uzbekistan	Team
- * Club domestic league appearances and goals as of 20:15, 28 July 2026 (UTC) ‡ National team caps and goals as of 28 June 2026

Jamshid Mahmudovich Iskanderov (Uzbek Cyrillic: Жамшид Маҳмудович Искандеров; born 16 October 1993) is an Uzbek professional footballer who plays for Neftchi Fergana and Uzbekistan national team.

== Club career ==
=== Pakhtakor ===
Iskanderov made his debut in Uzbek League on 28 May 2011 as FK Samarqand-Dinamo player in an away match against Qizilqum Zarafshon, coming in as a substitute in the 57th minute. Since 2011 he has played for Pakhtakor. In 2014, he was named twice, in May and October, as Player of the Month in Uzbek League.

On 6 March 2015 he won the "2014 Player of the Year in Uzbek League" award.

== International career ==
He made his debut for Uzbekistan on 6 September 2013 in the 2014 FIFA World Cup qualification match against Jordan. In 2015 AFC Asian Cup in Australia, he appeared in three matches.

On 2 June 2026, he was included in the 26-man squad selected by head coach Fabio Cannavaro for the 2026 FIFA World Cup, marking the country's first-ever appearance in the tournament.

== Career statistics ==
=== Club ===
As of match played 30 November 2024

Appearances and goals by club, season and competition
Club	Season	League			National cup		Continental		Other		Total	
Club	Season	Division	Apps	Goals	Apps	Goals	Apps	Goals	Apps	Goals	Apps	Goals
Dinamo Samarqand	2011	Uzbek League	2	0	2	0	—		—		4	0
Pakhtakor Tashkent	2011	Uzbek League	1	0	—		—		—		1	0
Pakhtakor Tashkent	2012	Uzbek League	4	1	1	0	0	0	—		5	1
Pakhtakor Tashkent	2013	Uzbek League	21	1	2	0	5	1	—		28	2
Pakhtakor Tashkent	2014	Uzbek League	25	6	4	0	—		—		29	6
Pakhtakor Tashkent	2015	Uzbek League	11	0	1	0	4	0	1	0	17	0
Pakhtakor Tashkent	2016	Uzbek League	21	7	1	0	3	0	1	0	26	7
Pakhtakor Tashkent	2017	Uzbek League	21	2	2	0	—		—		23	2
Pakhtakor Tashkent	2018	Uzbekistan Super League	22	2	4	0	1	0	—		27	2
Pakhtakor Tashkent	Total		126	19	15	0	13	1	2	0	156	20
Lokomotiv Tashkent	2019	Uzbekistan Super League	26	6	1	0	6	1	1	0	34	7
Seongnam FC	2020	K League 1	21	1	3	0	—		—		24	1
Seongnam FC	2021	K League 1	25	1	2	0	—		—		27	1
Seongnam FC	Total		46	2	5	0	—		—		51	2
Navbahor	2022	Uzbekistan Super League	26	7	7	4	—		—		33	11
Navbahor	2023	Uzbekistan Super League	26	4	5	1	7	2	—		38	7
Navbahor	2024	Uzbekistan Super League	25	7	6	0	2	0	—		33	7
Navbahor	Total		77	18	18	5	9	2	—		104	25
Career total			277	45	41	5	28	4	3	0	349	54

=== International ===
As of match played 27 January 2025

National team	Year	Apps	Goals
Uzbekistan
Uzbekistan	2013	4	0
Uzbekistan	2014	10	1
Uzbekistan	2015	3	0
Uzbekistan	2016	2	0
Uzbekistan	2017	1	0
Uzbekistan	2019	3	2
Uzbekistan	2020	1	0
Uzbekistan	2023	7	1
Uzbekistan	2024	6	0
Uzbekistan	2025	1	0
Total		37	4

Scores and results list Uzbekistan's goal tally first.

No.	Date	Venue	Opponent	Score	Result	Competition
1.	25 December 2014	Khalid bin Mohammed Stadium, Sharjah, United Arab Emirates	Iraq	1–0	1–0	Friendly
2.	10 October 2019	Pakhtakor Central Stadium, Tashkent, Uzbekistan	Yemen	3–0	5–0	2022 FIFA World Cup qualification
3.	9 November 2019	Pakhtakor Central Stadium, Tashkent, Uzbekistan	Kyrgyzstan	3–1	3–1	Friendly
4.	16 October 2023	Dalian Sports Centre Stadium, Dalian, China	China	2–1	2–1	Friendly

== Honours ==
Pakhtakor

- Uzbekistan Super League: 2012, 2014, 2015
- Uzbekistan Cup: 2011

Uzbekistan

- FIFA Series Runner-Up: 2026

Individual

- Uzbekistan Footballer of the Year 2022
- Uzbekistan Super League Player of the Year: 2014
