= Andrei Khodykin =

Russian footballer

Personal information
- Full name: Andrei Dmitriyevich Khodykin
- Date of birth: 21 March 1986 (age 40)
- Height: 1.86 m (6 ft 1 in)
- Position: Defender

Team information
- Current team: FC Dynamo Moscow (academy coach)

Youth career
- FC Dynamo Moscow

Senior career*
Years	Team	Apps	(Gls)
2003	SC Torpedo-ZIL Moscow		
2004	FC Torpedo-RG (amateur)		
2005	FC Smena Moscow (amateur)		
2006	FC Kharkiv	0	(0)
2007	FC Nika Moscow	8	(0)
2008–2009	FC MVD Rossii Moscow	16	(2)
2009	FC Torpedo-ZIL Moscow	6	(0)
2010	FC Sportakademklub Moscow	8	(0)
2010	FC Petrovka, 38 Moscow		
2011	FK Mash'al Mubarek	11	(2)
2012	FC Arsenal Tula (amateur)		
2012–2013	FC Arsenal Tula	27	(4)
2013–2014	FC Tekstilshchik Ivanovo	15	(1)
2015	FC TSK-Tavria Simferopol	4	(1)
2015	FC Chayka Korolyov		

Managerial career
- 2016–: FC Dynamo Moscow (academy)
- * Club domestic league appearances and goals

Andrei Dmitriyevich Khodykin (Russian: Андрей Дмитриевич Ходыкин; born 21 March 1986) is a Russian professional football coach and a former player. He works as a coach at the academy of FC Dynamo Moscow.

== Club career ==
He played one season in the Russian Football National League for FC MVD Rossii Moscow in 2009.
