= Alexei Casian =

Moldovan footballer

Personal information
- Full name: Alexei Casian
- Date of birth: 1 October 1987 (age 39)
- Place of birth: Bender, Moldavian SSR
- Height: 1.75 m (5 ft 9 in)
- Position: Midfielder

Team information
- Current team: Lane Xang Intra F.C.
- Number: 5

Senior career*
Years	Team	Apps	(Gls)
2008–2010	FC Olimpia	24	(3)
2010–2011	Iskra-Stal Rîbniţa	18	(0)
2011	FK Andijan	24	(0)
2012–2013	Iskra-Stal Rîbniţa	14	(0)
2013	Dinamo-Auto Tiraspol	14	(0)
2014	FK Andijan	10	(0)
2014–2015	Lane Xang Intra F.C.	1	(0)
2015–	Dinamo-Auto Tiraspol	28	(0)

International career
2004	Moldova U17	3	(0)
2006	Moldova U19	6	(0)
- * Club domestic league appearances and goals as of 17 September 2014

Alexei Casian (born 1 October 1987) is a Moldavian football midfielder who plays for Lane Xang Intra F.C.

== Club statistics ==
From 2008 to 2011, he played a total of 56 matches in the Moldovan National Division, scoring three goals. In February 2014, he moved back to the Uzbekistan Premier League club FK Andijan, where he had previously played in 2011. In the summer of that year, he terminated his contract due to the club's difficult situation in the league. In the autumn, Casian joined Lane Xang Intra F.C. and signed a one-year deal with the Laos Premier League side. On 16 September he played in a game against an all-star Brazilian team for the opening of a new stadium in Laos.
