= Predrag Vujović =

Montenegrin footballer

Personal information
- Full name: Predrag Vujović
- Date of birth: 20 August 1983 (age 43)
- Place of birth: Bar, SFR Yugoslavia
- Height: 1.80 m (5 ft 11 in)
- Position: Central midfielder

Senior career*
Years	Team	Apps	(Gls)
2001–2004	Napredak Kruševac	64	(8)
2005	Wisła Płock	22	(1)
2006–2007	Vojvodina	4	(0)
2007	→ Borac Čačak (loan)	9	(0)
2007–2010	Napredak Kruševac	80	(10)
2010–2011	Novi Pazar	17	(0)
2011	Shurtan Guzar	23	(2)
2012	Kecskemét	0	(0)
2012–2013	Metalac Gornji Milanovac	10	(0)
2014	Bukhoro	23	(3)
2015	Andijan	15	(2)
2016	Loznica	5	(0)
2016–2017	Trayal Kruševac		
2018	Jedinstvo Paraćin		
2018–2019	Temnić		
2019–2020	Jedinstvo Paraćin		
2020–2022	FK Jedinstvo 1936		
- * Club domestic league appearances and goals

Predrag Vujović (Serbian Cyrillic: Предраг Вујовић; born 20 August 1983) is a Montenegrin retired footballer who played as a midfielder.

== Club career ==
Born in Bar, SR Montenegro, he had previously played with Serbian clubs FK Napredak Kruševac, FK Vojvodina, FK Borac Čačak, FK Metalac Gornji Milanovac, Polish Wisła Płock, Uzbekistani FC Shurtan Guzar and FK Buxoro, and Hungarian Kecskeméti TE. In 2015, he signed a contract with FK Andijan. In the winter break of the 2015–16 season he returned to Serbia and joined FK Loznica.
