= Sherzod Karimov =

Uzbekistani footballer

Personal information
- Full name: Sherzod Karimov
- Date of birth: 26 January 1989 (age 37)
- Place of birth: Zarafshon, Uzbek SSR, USSR
- Height: 1.74 m (5 ft 8 1/2 in)
- Position: Midfielder

Team information
- Current team: Surkhon Termez
- Number: 8

Senior career*
Years	Team	Apps	(Gls)
2006–2007	Shaykhontohur Toshkent		
2008–2009	Qizilqum Zarafshon	12	(0)
2009–2018	Pakhtakor	160	(25)
2013	→ Qingdao Jonoon (loan)	6	(0)
2018	Lokomotiv Tashkent	1	(0)
2018	Navbahor Namangan	14	(0)
2019	Lokomotiv Tashkent	12	(2)
2020–	Surkhon Termez	9	(1)

International career^{‡}
2008	Uzbekistan U-19	6	(2)
2009	Uzbekistan U-20	17	(7)
2011–2012	Uzbekistan U-23	5	(2)
2009–	Uzbekistan	4	(0)
- * Club domestic league appearances and goals as of 15:45, 27 August 2020 (UTC) ‡ National team caps and goals as of 19 June 2013

Sherzod Karimov (Uzbek: Шерзод Каримов, born 26 January 1989) is an Uzbekistani footballer currently playing for Surkhon Termez as a midfielder.

== Career ==
Karimov has played for Shaykhontohur Toshkent, Qizilqum Zarafshon and currently Pakhtako]. he scored an important goal for Pakhtakor in the opening 2011 Asian Champions League group game against Al-Nassr of Saudi Arabia. The game finished 2-2.

He moved to the Chinese Super League side Qingdao Jonoon on a one-year loan deal on 28 February 2013. However, he failed to establish himself within the team and played six league matches (146 minutes in total, all coming on as a substitute) for Qingdao. On 22 May 2013, he scored a goal in the third round of 2013 Chinese FA Cup when Qingdao Jonoon beat second-tier club Harbin Yiteng 5–2. He returned to Pakhtakor Tashkent in June 2013.

== International career ==
Karimov has represented Uzbekistan at four international levels, U-19, U-20, U-23 and senior team.

== Honours ==
=== Club ===
Pakhtakor

- Uzbek League: 2012, 2014
- Uzbek League runners-up: 2009, 2010
- Uzbek Cup: 2009, 2011
