= Bojan Miladinović =

Serbian footballer

Personal information
- Full name: Bojan Miladinović
- Date of birth: 24 April 1982 (age 44)
- Place of birth: Kruševac, SFR Yugoslavia
- Height: 1.90 m (6 ft 3 in)
- Position: Centre-back

Team information
- Current team: Napredak Kruševac (vice-president)

Senior career*
Years	Team	Apps	(Gls)
2000–2003	Napredak Kruševac	58	(12)
2004–2008	Red Star Belgrade	24	(0)
2008	Napredak Kruševac	16	(3)
2009–2014	Pakhtakor Tashkent	97	(13)
2015	Felda United	32	(2)
2016–2019	Napredak Kruševac	52	(1)

International career
2004	Serbia and Montenegro U21	4	(0)
Medal record
Silver medal – second place	UEFA Under-21 Championship	2004
- * Club domestic league appearances and goals

Bojan "Kapka" Miladinović (Serbian Cyrillic: Бојан Миладиновић; born 24 April 1982) is a Serbian retired footballer and current vice-president of Napredak Kruševac.

== Club career ==
After starting out at Napredak, Miladinović was transferred to Red Star Belgrade in the 2004 winter transfer window. He managed to collect three doubles with the club, although receiving very limited playing time. In the summer of 2008, Miladinović briefly returned to his parent club Napredak, before moving abroad and joining Uzbek club Pakhtakor Tashkent. He spent the following six seasons at the club, winning two Uzbek League and two Uzbek Cup titles. Miladinović subsequently moved to Thailand and spent one year with Felda United, before again returning to Napredak in January 2016.

After retiring in January 2019, Miladinović was immediately appointed vice-president of Napredak.

== International career ==
Miladinović represented Serbia and Montenegro at the 2004 UEFA Under-21 Championship, as the team finished runners-up.

== Honours ==
=== Club ===
Napredak

- Second League of Serbia and Montenegro: 2002–03
- Serbian First League: 2015–16

Red Star Belgrade

- Serbian SuperLiga: 2003–04, 2005–06, 2006–07
- Serbian Cup: 2003–04, 2005–06, 2006–07

Pakhtakor Tashkent

- Uzbek League: 2012, 2014
- Uzbek Cup: 2009, 2011

=== International ===
Serbia and Montenegro

- UEFA Under-21 Championship: Runner-up 2004
