= Sanat Shikhov =

Uzbekistani footballer

Personal information
- Full name: Senat Shikhov
- Date of birth: 28 December 1989 (age 36)
- Height: 1.80 m (5 ft 11 in)
- Position: Midfielder

Team information
- Current team: Sogdiana Jizzakh

Senior career*
Years	Team	Apps	(Gls)
2006–2007	Shaykhontohur		
2008–2013	Pakhtakor Tashkent		
2012	→ Qizilqum Zarafshon (loan)		
2013–2014	Dinamo Samarqand		
2015	Navbahor Namangan		
2016–2018	Buxoro		
2019	AGMK		
2020–	Sogdiana Jizzakh		

International career^{‡}
2009	Uzbekistan U20		
2010	Uzbekistan U21		
2018	Uzbekistan	2	(0)
- * Club domestic league appearances and goals as of 13 November 2020 ‡ National team caps and goals as of 13 November 2020

Sanat Shikhov (born 28 December 1989) is an Uzbekistani football midfielder and left back who currently plays for Sogdiana Jizzakh. He was a squad member for the 2009 FIFA U-20 World Cup.
