= Vladimir Kozak =

Uzbekistani footballer

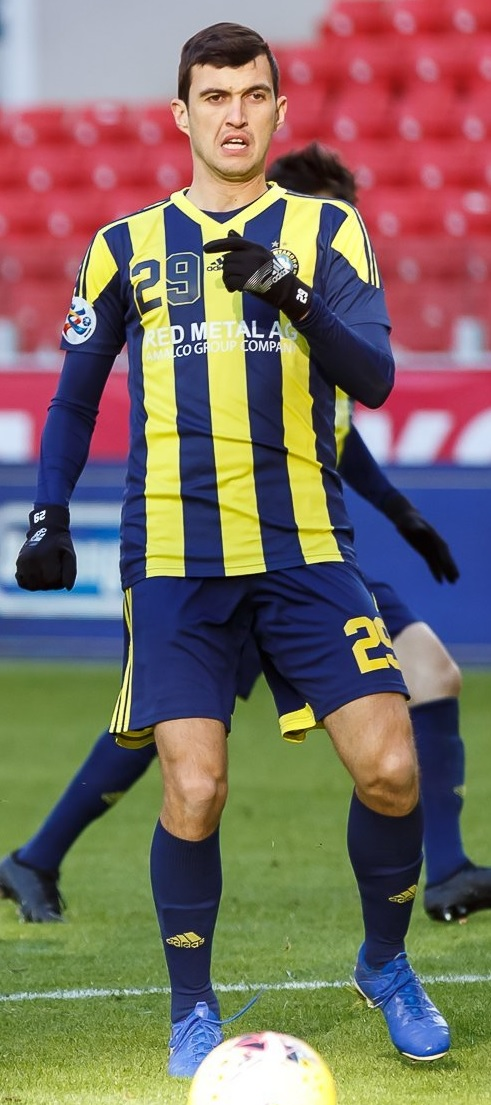
- Kozak with Pakhtakor Tashkent in 2020

Personal information
- Full name: Vladimir Kozak
- Date of birth: 12 June 1993 (age 33)
- Place of birth: Tashkent, Uzbekistan
- Height: 1.85 m (6 ft 1 in)
- Position: Defender

Team information
- Current team: FC Dinamo Samarqand

Senior career*
Years	Team	Apps	(Gls)
2010–2022	Pakhtakor Tashkent	208	(21)
2021	→ AGMK (loan)	3	(0)
2022	Navbahor Namangan	2	(0)
2024-	FC Dinamo Samarqand	3	(0)

International career^{‡}
2012	Uzbekistan U-19		
2013	Uzbekistan U-20		
2014–	Uzbekistan U-22		
2014–	Uzbekistan	7	(0)
- * Club domestic league appearances and goals as of 3/9/2024 @ 16:26(AEST) ‡ National team caps and goals as of 7 February 2020

Vladimir Kozak (Ukrainian: Володимир Козак, born 12 June 1993) is an Uzbek professional football player of Ukrainian descent who last played for Navbahor Namangan in the Uzbekistan Super League.

== Career ==
He has played his entire career with Pakhtakor Tashkent. He joined the Uzbek team in 2010. His league debut was against Bunyodkor. In 2012 season he scored 5 goals, including a brace against Buxoro. In 2014 season Kozak also scored 5 goals in League matches and won his second champion title with Pakhtakor.

== International career ==
On 29 May 2014 he made his official debut for national team in friendly match Uzbekistan - Oman.

== Honours ==
=== Club ===
- Uzbek League (2): 2012, 2014
- Uzbek League runners-up: 2010
- Uzbek Cup (1): 2011

=== International ===
- AFC U-19 Championship semifinal: 2012
