= Davron Khashimov =

Uzbek footballer (born 1992)

Personal information
- Full name: Davron Khashimov
- Date of birth: 24 November 1992 (age 33)
- Place of birth: Tashkent, Uzbekistan
- Height: 1.79 m (5 ft 10 in)
- Positions: Centre-back; right-back

Team information
- Current team: PFC Navbahor Namangan
- Number: 24

Senior career*
Years	Team	Apps	(Gls)
2011–2017	Pakhtakor	148	(5)
2018	Navbahor Namangan	24	(0)
2019–2020	Lokomotiv Tashkent	5	(0)
2020-	PFC Navbahor Namangan	65	(0)
Total		242	(5)

International career^{‡}
2013–	Uzbekistan	19	(0)
- * Club domestic league appearances and goals as of 23:03, 6 May 2019 (UTC) ‡ National team caps and goals as of 24 January 2019

Davron Khashimov (Uzbek: Davron Hoshimov, Uzbek Cyrillic: Даврон Хошимов; born 24 November 1992 in Tashkent) is an Uzbekistani footballer who plays for PFC Lokomotiv Tashkent and Uzbekistan national team. He played in the 2015 AFC Asian Cup qualification.

== Career ==
He plays since 2010 for Pakhtakor Tashkent. Khashimov played his debut match for the national team on 15 November 2013 in the away 2015 Asian Cup qualifying match against Vietnam ended with a 3:0 victory for the Uzbek side. He capped 2 matches for the national team (as of 29 May 2014).

In January 2019 it was announced that he signed for PFC Lokomotiv Tashkent

== Honors ==
Pakhtakor

- Uzbek League: 2012
- Uzbek Cup: 2011
