= Akbar Ismatullaev =

Uzbekistani footballer (born 1991)

Personal information
- Full name: Akbar Ismatullaev
- Date of birth: January 10, 1991 (age 35)
- Place of birth: Toshkent, Uzbekistan
- Height: 1.80 m (5 ft 11 in)
- Position: Defensive midfielder

Team information
- Current team: Bunyodkor
- Number: 7

Senior career*
Years	Team	Apps	(Gls)
2009–2017	Pakhtakor Tashkent	164	(1)
2018–2020	Metallurg Bekabad	48	(0)
2020	Buriram United	10	(0)
2021	Metallurg Bekabad	22	(0)
2022–2023	Bunyodkor	22	(0)
2024–	Dinamo Samarqand	0	(0)

International career^{‡}
2012–2020	Uzbekistan	6	(0)
- * Club domestic league appearances and goals as of 09:40, 18 December 2023 (UTC) ‡ National team caps and goals as of 5 March 2021

Akbar Ismatullaev is an Uzbek professional footballer who plays as a defensive midfielder for Bunyodkor.

== Honours ==
=== Club ===
Pakhtakor

- Uzbek League (2): 2012, 2014
- Uzbek Cup (1): 2011
- Liga 1
