= Roman Romanchuk (footballer) =

Ukrainian footballer

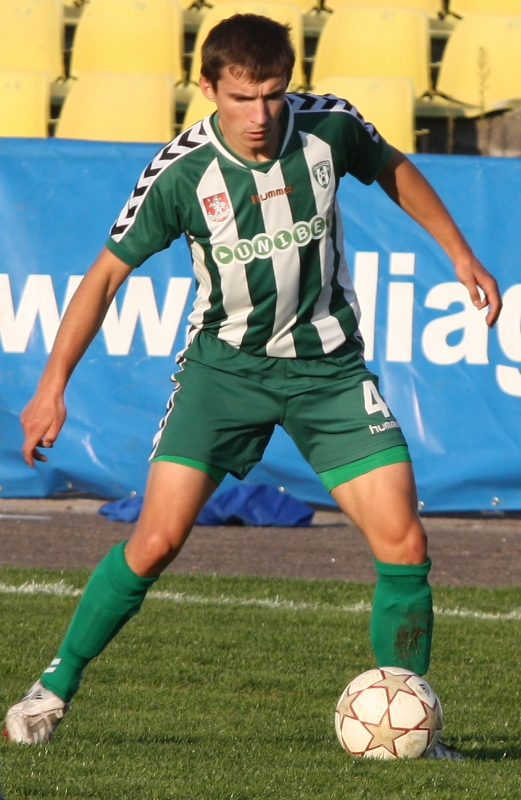
- Romanchuk in 2010

Personal information
- Full name: Roman Mykolayovych Romanchuk
- Date of birth: 19 August 1986 (age 40)
- Place of birth: Kovel, Volyn Oblast, Ukraine
- Height: 1.78 m (5 ft 10 in)

Senior career*
Years	Team	Apps	(Gls)
2006–2007	Ros Bila Tserkva	57	(3)
2008	Vindava	29	(1)
2009	Žalgiris	5	(1)
2009	Nyva Ternopil	6	(1)
2010	Žalgiris	18	(0)
2011	Buxoro	26	(3)
2012	Stal Alchevsk	12	(0)
2014–2023	Kovel		
- * Club domestic league appearances and goals as of 6 Feb 2016

Roman Romanchuk (Ukrainian: Роман Миколайович Романчук; born 19 August 1986) is a Ukrainian former professional football midfielder.
