= Aleksandr Kletskov =

Uzbekistani footballer

Personal information
- Full name: Aleksandr Kletskov
- Date of birth: 27 September 1985 (age 41)
- Place of birth: Mary, Turkmen SSR, Soviet Union
- Height: 1.85 m (6 ft 1 in)
- Position: Defender

Senior career*
Years	Team	Apps	(Gls)
2004–2008	Pakhtakor Tashkent	61	(4)
2009	Jiangsu Sainty	27	(5)
2010	Pakhtakor Tashkent	12	(1)
2010	Tianjin Teda	13	(0)
2011–2012	Pakhtakor Tashkent	34	(1)
2013	FK Dinamo Samarqand	11	(1)
2014	Neftchi Farg'ona	8	(0)
2015	Sogdiana Jizzakh	10	(0)
2017	Shukura Kobuleti	5	(0)

International career
2006	Uzbekistan	10	(3)
- * Club domestic league appearances and goals as of 26 March 2018

Aleksandr Kletskov (Russian: Александр Клецков; born 27 September 1985) is an Uzbekistani international football defender who most recently played for Shukura Kobuleti.

== Career ==
Kletskov began his playing career with Pakhtakor and has appeared for the club in several editions of the AFC Champions League. He also has played for Jiangsu Sainty and Tianjin Teda in the Chinese Super League.

On 13 July 2013 he joined Turkish club Orduspor, signing one year long agreement with club, but later transfer was canceled. In 2014 Kletskov played for Neftchi Farg'ona.

== Honours ==
Pakhtakor

- Uzbek League (3): 2005, 2006, 2007
- Uzbek Cup (4): 2005, 2006, 2007, 2009
- CIS cup: 2007
