= Temur Juraev =

Uzbekistani footballer

Personal information
- Full name: Temur Oltiboevich Juraev
- Date of birth: 12 May 1984 (age 42)
- Place of birth: Shakhrisabz, Uzbek SSR, Soviet Union
- Height: 1.90 m (6 ft 3 in)
- Position: Goalkeeper

Team information
- Current team: FC Shurtan Guzar

Senior career*
Years	Team	Apps	(Gls)
2002	Pakhtakor Tashkent	3	(0)
2003	Qizilqum Zarafshon	8	(0)
2004–2013	Pakhtakor Tashkent		(0)
2014	Lokomotiv Tashkent	2	(0)
2015–	Shurtan	3	(0)

International career^{‡}
2006–2011	Uzbekistan	12	(0)
- * Club domestic league appearances and goals as of 11 April 2015 ‡ National team caps and goals as of 19 May 2011

Temur Oltiboevich Juraev (Uzbek: Temur Joʻrayev, born 12 May 1984 in Toshkent) is an Uzbekistani football goalkeeper who currently plays for Shurtan Guzar.

== Career ==
Juraev has spent most of his career playing for Pakhtakor. He played for Pakhtakor between from 2004 until 2013. In 2014, he moved to Lokomotiv Tashkent. He played for the Uzbekistan national football team from 2006 until 2011.

== Honours ==
=== Club ===
Pakhtakor

- Uzbek League (6): 2002, 2004, 2005, 2006, 2007, 2012
- Uzbek Cup (7): 2002, 2004, 2005, 2006, 2007, 2009, 2011
- CIS cup: 2007
- AFC Champions League semi-final (2): 2003, 2004

Lokomotiv

- Uzbek League runners-up (1): 2014
- Uzbek Cup (1): 2014
- Uzbekistan Super Cup runners-up (1): 2014
