= Gulom Urunov =

Uzbek footballer

Personal information
- Full name: Gulom Urunov
- Date of birth: 7 June 1989 (age 37)
- Place of birth: Uzbekistan
- Height: 5 ft 10 in (1.78 m)
- Position: Defender

Senior career*
Years	Team	Apps	(Gls)
2009–2011	Pakhtakor Tashkent	14	(1)
2012	Qizilqum Zarafshon	22	(5)
2013	Pakhtakor Tashkent	10	(1)
2013	Neftchi Fergana	9	(1)
2014	Dinamo Samarqand	18	(2)
2015	Olmaliq	23	(2)
2016	Andijon	11	(0)
2017	Sogdiana Jizzakh	11	(1)
2017	Obod	3	(0)
2017	Gokulam Kerala	1	(0)

International career
2009	Uzbekistan U20	2	(0)
2010	Uzbekistan U23	5	(0)
- * Club domestic league appearances and goals as of 06:20, 18 July 2020 (UTC)

Gulom Urunov (born 7 June 1989) is an Uzbek former footballer who last played as a defender for Indian I-League side Gokulam Kerala.

== Club career ==
=== Gokulam Kerala ===
After playing his entire career in his native Uzbekistan, Urunov moved to India to sign with I-League side Gokulam Kerala. He made his debut for the club on 9 December 2017 against NEROCA. He started and played just the first half before being subbed off as Gokulam Kerala were defeated 0–3.
