= Stanislav Andreev =

Uzbekistani footballer

Personal information
- Date of birth: 6 May 1988 (age 38)
- Place of birth: Tashkent, Uzbekistan
- Height: 1.77 m (5 ft 10 in)
- Positions: Midfielder; left back

Team information
- Current team: Sogdiana Jizzakh
- Number: 28

Senior career*
Years	Team	Apps	(Gls)
2006	Topalang Sariosiyo	2	(0)
2007–2018	Pakhtakor Tashkent	171	(22)
2018	→ Metallurg Bekabad (loan)	12	(0)
2019–2021	Metallurg Bekabad	7	(2)
2022	Navbahor Namangan	19	(0)
2023–	Sogdiana Jizzakh	62	(2)

International career^{‡}
2009–2017	Uzbekistan	38	(2)
- * Club domestic league appearances and goals as of 11 August 2025 ‡ National team caps and goals as of 28 January 2017

Stanislav Andreev (Uzbek Cyrillic: Станислав Андреев; born 6 May 1988) is an Uzbek footballer who plays as a defensive midfielder for Sogdiana Jizzakh in the Uzbekistan Super League. He was a member of the Uzbekistan squad at the 2011 Asian Cup.

== Career ==
He has played for Pakhtakor Tashkent since 2007. He has been loaned to Metallurg Bekabad in 2018 for half season.

== International career ==
Andreev played for national team in 2011 AFC Asian Cup.

=== International goals ===
Scores and results list Uzbekistan's goal tally first.

Goal	Date	Venue	Opponent	Score	Result	Competition
1.	25 February 2012	Jeonju World Cup Stadium, Jeonju, South Korea	South Korea	2–3	2–4	Friendly
2.	17 November 2015	Grand Hamad Stadium, Doha, Qatar	Yemen	3–0	3–1	2018 FIFA World Cup qualification

== Honours ==
=== Club ===
- Uzbek League (3): 2007, 2012, 2014, 2015
- Uzbek League runners-up (3): 2008, 2009, 2010
- Uzbek Cup (3): 2007, 2009, 2011

=== International ===
- AFC Asian Cup 4th: 2011
