= Irakli Klimiashvili =

Georgian footballer

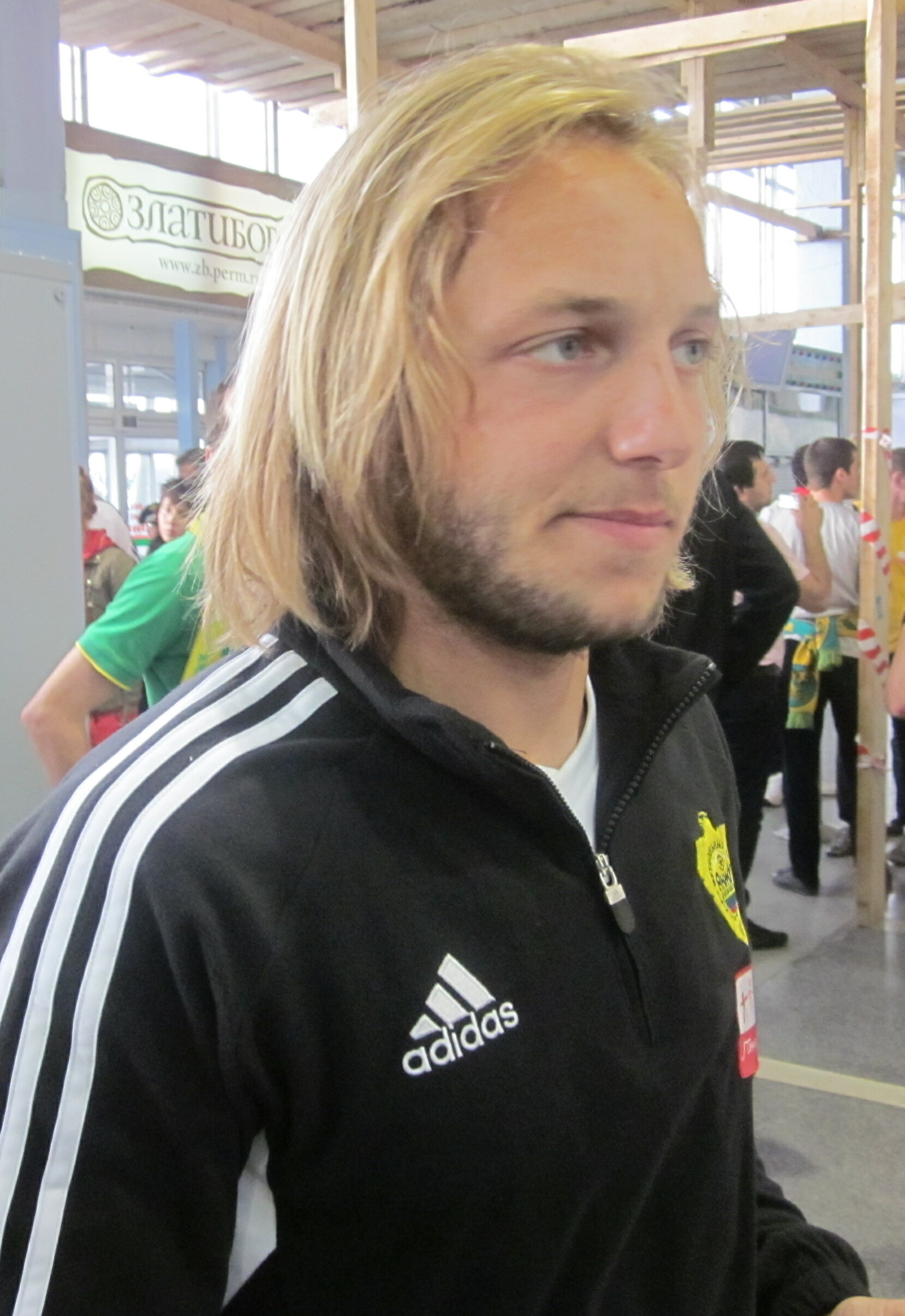
- Klimiashvili in 2011

Personal information
- Date of birth: 30 May 1988 (age 38)
- Place of birth: Tbilisi, Georgian SSR
- Height: 1.74 m (5 ft 9 in)
- Position: Midfielder

Team information
- Current team: Gareji Sagarejo
- Number: 2

Youth career
- 2002–2005: WIT Georgia

Senior career*
Years	Team	Apps	(Gls)
2005–2011	WIT Georgia	108	(8)
2011–2012	Anzhi Makhachkala	0	(0)
2011–2012	→ Pakhtakor Tashkent (on loan)	22	(2)
2012–2013	Dila Gori	18	(2)
2013	Sioni Bolnisi	6	(1)
2013–2015	Skonto Riga	43	(2)
2015–2016	Torpedo Kutaisi	40	(6)
2016–2017	Locomotive Tbilisi	11	(0)
2017	Shukura Kobuleti	34	(0)
2018	Rustavi	5	(0)
2018	→ Merani Martvili (loan)	15	(0)
2019–2021	Zugdidi	78	(7)
2022–2023	Gareji Sagarejo	9	(0)

International career
2007–2010	Georgia U21	12	(0)
2008–2009	Georgia	5	(0)
- * Club domestic league appearances and goals as of 30 December 2022

Irakli Klimiashvili (Georgian: ირაკლი კლიმიაშვილი; born 30 May 1988) is a former Georgian footballer who played as a midfielder.

Largely known for his successful tenure at WIT Georgia, in the late 2000s Klimiashvili was a member of the national team as well.

== Career ==
As a footballer, Irakli Klimiashvili grew up at WIT Georgia, one of the most decorated Georgian teams in the first decade of XXI century.

After three years at the youth club, in 2005 he was promoted to the main team, which had won the national league in the previous year. In the next three years they twice finished as runner-ups before securing another top title in 2009. Being a key player in his club, Klimishvili was regularly called up by U21 team.

He made his debut for Georgian national team on 27 May 2008 in a 1–1 friendly game against Estonia as a substitute. Later he featured in four more matches, including in a UEFA World Cup qualifying game against Montenegro.

In 2013, Klimiashvili joined the Latvian side Skonto Riga, which came 2nd both in the league and Cup competitions this season.

Since 2018 he has been playing in the Georgian second division.

== Honours ==
Umaglesi Liga

- Winner: 2008/2009

David Kipiani Cup

- Winner: 2009/2010

Georgian Super Cup

- Winner: 2009/2010
- Runner-up: 2010/2011

Uzbekistan Cup

- Winner: 2011

Latvian Virsliga

- Runner-up: 2013, 2014

Latvian Cup

- Runner-up: 2013/2014
