= Ilhom Suyunov =

Uzbekistani footballer

Personal information
- Full name: Ilhomjon Anvarovich Suyunov
- Date of birth: 17 May 1983 (age 43)
- Place of birth: Uzbekistan
- Height: 1.83 m (6 ft 0 in)
- Position: Defender

Team information
- Current team: Lokomotiv Tashkent
- Number: 2

Senior career*
Years	Team	Apps	(Gls)
2001	Yangiyer	6	(1)
2002–2003	Mash'al Mubarek	44	(1)
2004–2013	Pakhtakor Tashkent		
2013–	Lokomotiv Tashkent	6	(1)

International career^{‡}
2006–	Uzbekistan	21	(1)
- * Club domestic league appearances and goals as of 10 August 2014 ‡ National team caps and goals as of 24 August 2013

Ilhom Suyunov (born 17 May 1983) is an Uzbekistani footballer currently playing for Uzbek League club Lokomotiv Tashkent as a defender.

== Career ==
In 2004–2013 Suyunov played for Pakhtakor Tashkent. On 12 July 2013 he signed a contract with Lokomotiv Tashkent after playing 10 seasons for Pakhtakor.

== International ==
Suyunov has made 21 appearances for the Uzbekistan national football team, scoring 1 goal.

== Honours ==
Pakhtakor

- Uzbek League (5): 2004, 2005, 2006, 2007, 2012
- Uzbek Cup (6): 2004, 2005, 2006, 2007, 2009, 2011
- CIS cup: 2007
- AFC Champions League Semi-final (1): 2004

Lokomotiv

- Uzbek League runner-up (1): 2013

== Career statistics ==
=== Goals for Senior National Team ===
#	Date	Venue	Opponent	Score	Result	Competition
1	28 October 2007	Taipei, Taiwan	Chinese Taipei	2–0	Won	2010 FIFA World Cup Qualification
