= Dilshod Sharofetdinov =

Uzbek footballer (born 1985)

Personal information
- Full name: Dilshod Sharofetdinov
- Date of birth: 15 October 1985 (age 41)
- Place of birth: Samarkand, Uzbekistan
- Height: 1.88 m (6 ft 2 in)
- Position: Midfielder

Senior career*
Years	Team	Apps	(Gls)
2004–2008	FK Samarqand-Dinamo	92	(15)
2009–2013	FC Pakhtakor Tashkent	40	(6)
2009–2010	→ Navbahor (loan)	14	(2)
2014–2015	Sime Darby	12	(5)
2015–2016	FK Samarqand-Dinamo	15	(2)
2016–2018	T–Team	42	(10)
2018	PSMS Medan	13	(2)

International career^{‡}
2006	Uzbekistan U-23s	4	(0)
- * Club domestic league appearances and goals as of 13 July 2018 ‡ National team caps and goals as of 5 December 2013

Dilshod Sharofetdinov (born 15 October 1985) is an Uzbek footballer who plays as a midfielder for Indonesian Liga 1 club PSMS Medan.

== Club career ==
Sharofetdinov has played for FK Samarqand-Dinamo, Navbahor and FC Pakhtakor Tashkent. During the 2009 AFC Champions League he played in all six games as Pakhtakor progressed to the Quarter Finals where they were defeated by Ittihad FC 5–1 on aggregate. During the 2011 AFC Champions League Sharofetdinov helped FC Pakhtakor Tashkent to a 2–2 over Al-Nassr in their opening round game. He got a major injury in 2016 after which his career slowed down.

On 13 March 2018, he signed a one-year contract with Liga 1 club PSMS Medan.

== Career statistics ==
As of 1 November 2017.

Club	Season	League		Cup (Note: The Malaysia FA Cup)	
Club	Season	Apps	Goals	Apps	Goals
T–Team	2016	20	6	2	0
T–Team	2017	22	4	1	0
Total		42	10	3	0

== International career ==
Sharofetdinov has represented the Uzbekistan U-23s at the VTV-T&T Cup.
