= Kakhi Makharadze =

Georgian footballer

Personal information
- Full name: Kakhaber Makharadze
- Date of birth: 20 October 1987 (age 39)
- Place of birth: Tbilisi, Georgian SSR
- Height: 1.87 m (6 ft 2 in)
- Position: Midfielder

Youth career
- 2003: Dinamo Batumi

Senior career*
Years	Team	Apps	(Gls)
2003–2007	Dinamo Tbilisi	29	(2)
2007	Chikhura Sachkhere	7	(0)
2007–2008	Dinamo Batumi	12	(3)
2008–2009	Lokomotivi Tbilisi	27	(3)
2009–2010	Lokomotiv Tashkent	24	(2)
2011–2015	Pakhtakor Tashkent	121	(26)
2016–2018	Lokomotiv Tashkent	86	(5)
2019	Sogdiana Jizzakh	26	(5)
2020–2022	Lokomotiv Tashkent	60	(4)

International career
2004	Georgia U19	1	(0)
2005–2007	Georgia U21	6	(0)
2006–2015	Georgia	4	(0)
- * Club domestic league appearances and goals as of 13:28, 20 October 2022 (UTC)

Kakhaber 'Kakhi' Makharadze (Georgian: კახაბერ 'კახი' მახარაძე; born 20 October 1987) is a Georgian football midfielder who is currently banned for 5 years.

His father Malkhaz Makharadze (also known as Makho Makharadze) and younger brother Boris Makharadze are also professional footballers.

== Club career ==
=== Lokomotiv Tashkent ===
Makharadze joined Lokomotiv Tashkent in 2009 and, according to a club official site survey, was chosen as the clubs "Best Player of The Year 2009" with 40% of total votes.

=== Pakhtakor Tashkent ===
On 26 February 2011, it was announced that Makharadze had signed for Pakhtakor Tashkent among other new signings for the club. He moved to Pakhtakor from fellow capital club Lokomotiv Tashkent. He was captain of the club until 2016, when he returned to Lokomotiv.

== International career ==
Makharadze made his official debut in UEFA tournaments as a national player in a match for Georgia U20 against Slovakia U-19 on 18 October 2004. This was won by Georgia with a scoreline of 4–2.

== Match fixing ==
In September 2022, Makharadze was handed a five-year ban for match-fixing after accepting money to fix the Uzbekistan Super League game between his club Lokomotiv Tashkent and Navbahor Namangan in the March 2022.

== Honours ==
Dinamo Tbilisi

- Umaglesi Liga: 2004–05
- Georgian Super Cup: 2005–06

Pakhtakor

- Uzbek League: 2012, 2014
- Uzbekistan Cup: 2011

Individual

- Lokomotiv Tashkent Player of the Year: 2009
