= List of Uzbek football transfers 2010 =

This is a list of Uzbek football transfers in the years of 2009–10 by club. Only transfers of the Uzbek League are provided.

== Uzbek League ==
=== FK Andijan ===
In: Note: Flags indicate national team as defined under FIFA eligibility rules; some limited exceptions apply. Players may hold more than one non-FIFA nationality.

| No. | Pos. | Nation | Player |
|---|---|---|---|
| — | MF | (Kyrgyzstan) KGZ | Karim Izrailov (from Mash'al Mubarek) |
| — | DF | (Ukraine) UKR | Aleksandr Polovkov (from Navbahor Namangan) |
| — | MF | (Uzbekistan) UZB | Islom Akhmedov (from FK Samarqand-Dinamo) |
| — | FW | (Moldova) MDA | Dimitru Baćal (from (Moldova) FC Dacia Chişinău) |
| — | GK | (Uzbekistan) UZB | Pavel Bugalo (from Bunyodkor) |

Out: Note: Flags indicate national team as defined under FIFA eligibility rules; some limited exceptions apply. Players may hold more than one non-FIFA nationality.

| No. | Pos. | Nation | Player |
|---|---|---|---|
| _ | MF | (Uzbekistan) UZB | Renat Bayramov (to Xorazm FK Urganch) |
| _ | MF | (Uzbekistan) UZB | Mukhtor Fozilov (to Navbahor Namangan) |
| _ | FW | (Uzbekistan) UZB | Viktor Klishin (to FC Shurtan Guzar) |
| _ | MF | (Uzbekistan) UZB | Sherzod Raimjonov (to Mash'al Mubarek) |

=== FC Bunyodkor ===
In: Note: Flags indicate national team as defined under FIFA eligibility rules; some limited exceptions apply. Players may hold more than one non-FIFA nationality.

| No. | Pos. | Nation | Player |
|---|---|---|---|
| _ | DF | (Turkmenistan) TKM | Goçguly Goçgulyýew (Unknown) |
| _ | FW | (Montenegro) MNE | Bojan Kalević (from Metalourg Bekabad) |
| _ | DF | (Uzbekistan) UZB | Khikmat Khoshimov (from Metalourg Bekabad) |
| _ | DF | (Uzbekistan) UZB | Aleksandr Khvostunov (from FK Samarqand-Dinamo) |
| _ | MF | (Uzbekistan) UZB | Yannis Mandzukas (from Lokomotiv Tashkent) |
| _ | DF | (Uzbekistan) UZB | Anvar Ismailov (from FC Pakhtakor Tashkent) |
| _ | GK | (Uzbekistan) UZB | Ignatiy Nesterov (from FC Pakhtakor Tashkent) |

Out: Note: Flags indicate national team as defined under FIFA eligibility rules; some limited exceptions apply. Players may hold more than one non-FIFA nationality.

| No. | Pos. | Nation | Player |
|---|---|---|---|
| 11 | FW | (Brazil) BRA | Denilson (to (Brazil) Mogi Mirim) |
| 30 | MF | (Uzbekistan) UZB | Server Djeparov (to (South Korea) FC Seoul) |
| 19 | MF | (Uzbekistan) UZB | Jasur Hasanov (to (Qatar) Lekhwiya) |
| 20 | DF | (Uzbekistan) UZB | Hayrulla Karimov (to Nasaf Qarshi) |
| _ | DF | (Uzbekistan) UZB | Shavkat Raimqulov (to FC Shurtan Guzar) |
| 8 | DF | (Brazil) BRA | Edson Ramos Silva (to (Spain) RCD Mallorca) |
| 9 | FW | (North Macedonia) MKD | Stevica Ristić (to (Russia) FC Amkar Perm) |
| 10 | MF | (Brazil) BRA | Rivaldo (to (Brazil) Mogi Mirim) |
| _ | MF | (Uzbekistan) UZB | Shavkat Salomov (to Nasaf Qarshi) |
| 20 | FW | (Uzbekistan) UZB | Anvar Soliev (to Nasaf Qarshi) |
| 29 | MF | (Brazil) BRA | João Victor (to (Spain) RCD Mallorca) |
| 20 | GK | (Uzbekistan) UZB | Murod Zukhurov (to Nasaf Qarshi) |
| _ | DF | (Uzbekistan) UZB | Abduqahhor Khojiakbarov (to Olmaliq FK) |
| _ | DF | (Uzbekistan) UZB | Aziz Gulomkhodjaev (to Olmaliq FK) |
| _ | FW | (Uzbekistan) UZB | Ulugbek Bakayev (to (Kazakhstan) FC Tobol) |
| _ | GK | (Uzbekistan) UZB | Pavel Bugalo (to FK Andijan) |
| _ | FW | (Uzbekistan) UZB | Kamoliddin Murzoev (to Nasaf Qarshi) |
| _ | FW | (Chile) CHI | José Luis Villanueva (to (China) Tianjin Teda) |
| _ | FW | (Brazil) BRA | Aloísio José da Silva (to (Brazil) Ceará Sporting Club) |

=== Lokomotiv Tashkent ===
In: Note: Flags indicate national team as defined under FIFA eligibility rules; some limited exceptions apply. Players may hold more than one non-FIFA nationality.

| No. | Pos. | Nation | Player |
|---|---|---|---|
| _ | MF | (Uzbekistan) UZB | Azizkhon Ibragimov (from Xorazm FK Urganch) |
| _ | FW | (Ukraine) UKR | Nikolay Guryanov (Unknown) |
| _ | MF | (Uzbekistan) UZB | Vladilsav Kiryan (from Zarafshon NtsZ) |
| _ | MF | (Uzbekistan) UZB | Nodir Quziboev (free agent) |
| _ | FW | (Turkmenistan) TKM | Yusup Orazmamedov (Unknown) |
| _ | MF | (Uzbekistan) UZB | Sadriddin Abdullaev (from FC Pakhtakor Tashkent) |
| _ | MF | (Turkmenistan) TKM | Ahmed Ollaberdiyev (Unknown) |
| _ | DF | (Uzbekistan) UZB | Obid Djurabayev (from Xorazm FK Urganch) |
| _ | DF | (Ukraine) UKR | Sergei Litovchenko (Unknown) |
| _ | DF | (Uzbekistan) UZB | Alisher Yusupov (from FC Shurtan Guzar) |

Out: Note: Flags indicate national team as defined under FIFA eligibility rules; some limited exceptions apply. Players may hold more than one non-FIFA nationality.

| No. | Pos. | Nation | Player |
|---|---|---|---|
| _ | FW | (Uzbekistan) UZB | Abdulatif Abduqodirov (to Qizilqum Zarafshon) |
| _ | FW | (Uzbekistan) UZB | Olim Navkarov (to Qizilqum Zarafshon) |
| _ | DF | (Uzbekistan) UZB | Vitaliy Pachuyev (to Qizilqum Zarafshon) |
| _ | MF | (Uzbekistan) UZB | Rustam M. Azamov (to Xorazm FK Urganch) |
| _ | MF | (Uzbekistan) UZB | Timur Ayzatulov (to Navbahor Namangan) |
| _ | GK | (Uzbekistan) UZB | Aziz Ashurov (to Navbahor Namangan) |
| _ | MF | (Uzbekistan) UZB | Timur Vasilyev (to FK Samarqand-Dinamo) |
| _ | MF | (Uzbekistan) UZB | Yannis Mandzukas (to FC Bunyodkor) |
| _ | FW | (Armenia) ARM | Aram Voskanyan (to (Armenia) Mika F.C.) |
| _ | FW | (Uzbekistan) UZB | Aziz Tuhtabayev (to Xorazm FK Urganch) |
| _ | DF | (Russia) RUS | Yuriy Shelenkov (to (Latvia) FC Daugava) |

=== Mash'al Mubarek ===
In: Note: Flags indicate national team as defined under FIFA eligibility rules; some limited exceptions apply. Players may hold more than one non-FIFA nationality.

| No. | Pos. | Nation | Player |
|---|---|---|---|
| _ | MF | (Uzbekistan) UZB | Jasur Boboev (from Nasaf Qarshi) |
| _ | FW | (Bosnia and Herzegovina) BIH | Aleksandar Brđanin (from (Montenegro) FK Kom) |
| _ | MF | (Serbia) SRB | Igor Petković (from (Serbia) FK Srem) |
| _ | MF | (Uzbekistan) UZB | Sherzod Raimjonov (from FK Andijan) |
| _ | FW | (Belarus) BLR | Nikolay Rindyuk (from (Belarus) FC Partizan Minsk) |
| _ | DF | (Uzbekistan) UZB | Nasim Shoimov (free agent) |
| _ | MF | (Serbia) SRB | Vladislav Virić (from (Serbia) FK Sevojno) |

Out: Note: Flags indicate national team as defined under FIFA eligibility rules; some limited exceptions apply. Players may hold more than one non-FIFA nationality.

| No. | Pos. | Nation | Player |
|---|---|---|---|
| _ | DF | (Georgia (country)) GEO | David Chigladze (Unknown) |
| _ | FW | (Ukraine) UKR | Aleksandr Grebenyuk (to (Ukraine) FC Lviv) |
| _ | FW | (Georgia (country)) GEO | Grigoriy Imemadze (Unknown) |
| _ | MF | (Kyrgyzstan) KGZ | Karim Izrailov (to FK Andijan) |
| _ | MF | (Belarus) BLR | Aleksei Khaletskiy (to (Belarus) FC Vitebsk) |
| _ | FW | (Uzbekistan) UZB | Tulkin Mirzaev (to Xorazm FK Urganch) |
| _ | FW | (Ukraine) UKR | Aleksandr Stakhiv (Unknown) |

=== Metalourg Bekabad ===
In: Note: Flags indicate national team as defined under FIFA eligibility rules; some limited exceptions apply. Players may hold more than one non-FIFA nationality.

| No. | Pos. | Nation | Player |
|---|---|---|---|
| _ | GK | (Ukraine) UKR | Andrei Sirotyuk (Unknown) |
| _ | MF | (Uzbekistan) UZB | Mukhim Toshmatov (from FC Pakhtakor Tashkent) |

Out: Note: Flags indicate national team as defined under FIFA eligibility rules; some limited exceptions apply. Players may hold more than one non-FIFA nationality.

| No. | Pos. | Nation | Player |
|---|---|---|---|
| _ | FW | (Serbia) SRB | Bojan Kalević (to Bunyodkor) |
| — | DF | (Uzbekistan) UZB | Khikmat Khoshimov (to Bunyodkor) |

=== Nasaf Qarshi ===
In: Note: Flags indicate national team as defined under FIFA eligibility rules; some limited exceptions apply. Players may hold more than one non-FIFA nationality.

| No. | Pos. | Nation | Player |
|---|---|---|---|
| _ | MF | (Serbia) SRB | Đorđe Ivelja (from (Romania) FC Rapid București) |
| _ | FW | (Uzbekistan) UZB | Zafar Kholmurodov (from Xorazm FK Urganch) |
| _ | FW | (Ukraine) UKR | Andrei Jakovlev (Unknown) |
| _ | DF | (Uzbekistan) UZB | Hayrulla Karimov (from Bunyodkor) |
| _ | MF | (Uzbekistan) UZB | Shavkat Salomov (from Bunyodkor) |
| _ | FW | (Uzbekistan) UZB | Anvar Soliev (from Bunyodkor) |
| _ | GK | (Uzbekistan) UZB | Murod Zukhurov (from Bunyodkor) |
| _ | FW | (Uzbekistan) UZB | Kamoliddin Murzoev (from Bunyodkor) |

Out: Note: Flags indicate national team as defined under FIFA eligibility rules; some limited exceptions apply. Players may hold more than one non-FIFA nationality.

| No. | Pos. | Nation | Player |
|---|---|---|---|
| _ | FW | (Moldova) MDA | Gheorghe Boghiu (to (Moldova) FC Milsami) |
| _ | MF | (Moldova) MDA | Iulian Bursuć (to (Moldova) FC Dacia Chişinău) |
| _ | MF | (Uzbekistan) UZB | Jasur Boboev (to Mash'al Mubarek) |
| _ | DF | (Uzbekistan) UZB | Islom Inomov (to (China) Liaoning Whowin) |
| 30 | GK | (Ukraine) UKR | Dmytro Kozachenko (Unknown) |
| _ | FW | (Ukraine) UKR | Oleg Melniyk (Unknown) |
| _ | FW | (Uzbekistan) UZB | Bakhodir Pardaev (tp Navbahor Namangan) |

=== Navbahor Namangan ===
In: Note: Flags indicate national team as defined under FIFA eligibility rules; some limited exceptions apply. Players may hold more than one non-FIFA nationality.

| No. | Pos. | Nation | Player |
|---|---|---|---|
| _ | GK | (Uzbekistan) UZB | Aziz Ashurov (from Lokomotiv Tashkent) |
| _ | MF | (Uzbekistan) UZB | Mukhtor Fozilov (from FK Andijan) |
| _ | MF | (Uzbekistan) UZB | Timur Ayzatulov (from Lokomotiv Tashkent) |
| _ | DF | (Uzbekistan) UZB | Doniyor Usmanov (from Olmaliq FK) |
| _ | DF | (Russia) RUS | Mikhailo Danisov (from (Ukraine) FC Zirka Kirovohrad) |
| _ | DF | (Uzbekistan) UZB | Rakhmatullo Berdimurodov (from FC Pakhtakor Tashkent) |
| _ | FW | (Ukraine) UKR | Yevgeniy Saiko (from (Azerbaijan) Turan Tovuz) |
| _ | FW | (Ukraine) UKR | Maksim Krivoi (from (Ukraine) FC Metalurh Zaporizhya) |

Out: Note: Flags indicate national team as defined under FIFA eligibility rules; some limited exceptions apply. Players may hold more than one non-FIFA nationality.

| No. | Pos. | Nation | Player |
|---|---|---|---|
| _ | FW | (Uzbekistan) UZB | Bakhodir Pardaev (to Sughdiyona Jizzakh) |
| _ | DF | (Ukraine) UKR | Aleksei Khmratsov |
| _ | DF | (Uzbekistan) UZB | Akmal Kholmurodov (to FC Pakhtakor Tashkent) |
| _ | GK | (Ukraine) UKR | Nikolay Pavlenko (to (Ukraine) FC Volyn Lutsk) |
| _ | DF | (Ukraine) UKR | Aleksandr Polovkov (to FK Andijan) |
| _ | MF | (Uzbekistan) UZB | Dilshod Sharofetdinov (to FC Pakhtakor Tashkent) |
| _ | FW | (Ukraine) UKR | Yuriy Tselykh (to (Ukraine) PFC Oleksandria) |
| _ | MF | (Uzbekistan) UZB | Andrei Vlasichev (to Olmaliq FK) |

=== FK Neftchi Farg'ona ===
In: Note: Flags indicate national team as defined under FIFA eligibility rules; some limited exceptions apply. Players may hold more than one non-FIFA nationality.

| No. | Pos. | Nation | Player |
|---|---|---|---|
| _ | FW | (Uzbekistan) UZB | Oybek Nurbaev (from Jayhun Nukus) |
| _ | DF | (Uzbekistan) UZB | Vladimir Radkevich (Unknown) |

=== Olmaliq FK ===
In: Note: Flags indicate national team as defined under FIFA eligibility rules; some limited exceptions apply. Players may hold more than one non-FIFA nationality.

| No. | Pos. | Nation | Player |
|---|---|---|---|
| _ | MF | (Turkmenistan) TKM | Murod Khamroyev (from (Azerbaijan) FK Karvan) |
| _ | DF | (Uzbekistan) UZB | Abduqahhor Khojiakbarov (from Bunyodkor) |
| _ | MF | (Uzbekistan) UZB | Andrei Vlasichev (from Navbahor Namangan) |
| _ | GK | (Ukraine) UKR | Denys Yershov (from (Ukraine) FSC Prykarpattya Ivano-Frankivsk) |

Out: Note: Flags indicate national team as defined under FIFA eligibility rules; some limited exceptions apply. Players may hold more than one non-FIFA nationality.

| No. | Pos. | Nation | Player |
|---|---|---|---|
| _ | MF | (Uzbekistan) UZB | Aziz Gulyamkhodjaev (Unknown) |
| _ | DF | (Uzbekistan) UZB | Jasur Khamroyev (to FK Samarqand-Dinamo) |
| _ | MF | (Ukraine) UKR | Aleksandr Pozdeev (Unknown) |
| _ | DF | (Uzbekistan) UZB | Doniyor Usmanov (to Navbahor Namangan) |

=== FC Pakhtakor Tashkent ===
In: Note: Flags indicate national team as defined under FIFA eligibility rules; some limited exceptions apply. Players may hold more than one non-FIFA nationality.

| No. | Pos. | Nation | Player |
|---|---|---|---|
| _ | FW | (Uzbekistan) UZB | Zaynitdin Tadjiyev (from FC Ordabasy) |

Out: Note: Flags indicate national team as defined under FIFA eligibility rules; some limited exceptions apply. Players may hold more than one non-FIFA nationality.

| No. | Pos. | Nation | Player |
|---|---|---|---|
| 11 | MF | (Uzbekistan) UZB | Asqar Jadigerov (to (China) Nanchang Hengyuan) |
| 9 | FW | (Serbia) SRB | Milorad Janjuš (to (Iran) Sepahan F.C.) |
| 8 | MF | (Tajikistan) TJK | Akmal Kholmatov (to (Iran) PAS Hamedan F.C.) |
| _ | DF | (Uzbekistan) UZB | Aleksandr Kletskov (to (China) Tianjin Teda) |
| 15 | MF | (Uzbekistan) UZB | Mukhim Toshmatov (to Metalourg Bekabad) |
| — | MF | (Uzbekistan) UZB | Aleksandr Vostrikov (to Qizilqum Zarafshon) |
| — | FW | (Nigeria) NGA | Uche Ilheroume (to (Iran) Shahin Bushehr F.C.) |
| — | DF | (Uzbekistan) UZB | Rakhmatullo Berdimurodov (to Navbahor Namangan) |
| — | DF | (Uzbekistan) UZB | Anzur Ismailov (to Bunyodkor) |
| — | DF | (Uzbekistan) UZB | Asror Aliqulov (to FC Shurtan Guzar) |
| — | MF | (Uzbekistan) UZB | Renat Bayramov (to FK Andijan) |
| — | MF | (Uzbekistan) UZB | Vladislav Kiryan (to Lokomotiv Tashkent) |
| — | MF | (Uzbekistan) UZB | Nodir Quziboev (to Lokomotiv Tashkent) |
| — | MF | (Serbia) SRB | Milan Nikolić (to (Kazakhstan) FC Irtysh Pavlodar) |
| — | GK | (Uzbekistan) UZB | Ignatiy Nesterov (to Bunyodkor) |

=== Qizilqum Zarafshon ===
In: Note: Flags indicate national team as defined under FIFA eligibility rules; some limited exceptions apply. Players may hold more than one non-FIFA nationality.

| No. | Pos. | Nation | Player |
|---|---|---|---|
| _ | MF | (Uzbekistan) UZB | Aleksandr Vostrikov (from FC Pakhtakor Tashkent) |
| _ | FW | (Uzbekistan) UZB | Abdulatif Abduqodirov (from Lokomotiv Tashkent) |
| _ | FW | (Uzbekistan) UZB | Olim Navkarov (from Lokomotiv Tashkent) |
| _ | DF | (Uzbekistan) UZB | Vitaliy Pachuyev (from Lokomotiv Tashkent) |
| _ | DF | (Ukraine) UKR | Roman Pasichnichenko (from (Ukraine) FC Stal Alchevsk) |
| _ | MF | (Ukraine) UKR | Andrei Lisyuk (from (Ukraine) FC Arsenal Bila Tserkva) |

Out: Note: Flags indicate national team as defined under FIFA eligibility rules; some limited exceptions apply. Players may hold more than one non-FIFA nationality.

| No. | Pos. | Nation | Player |
|---|---|---|---|
| _ | FW | (Uzbekistan) UZB | Vladimir Baranov (Unknown) |
| _ | MF | (Ukraine) UKR | Dmytro Kolodin (to (Belarus) FC Naftan Novopolotsk) |

=== FK Samarqand-Dinamo ===
In: Note: Flags indicate national team as defined under FIFA eligibility rules; some limited exceptions apply. Players may hold more than one non-FIFA nationality.

| No. | Pos. | Nation | Player |
|---|---|---|---|
| _ | DF | (Ukraine) UKR | Sergei Datsenko (from (Ukraine) FC Helios Kharkiv) |
| _ | DF | (Uzbekistan) UZB | Jasur Khamroyev (from Olmaliq FK) |
| _ | DF | (Ukraine) UKR | Igor Soltanići (from (Kazakhstan) FC Taraz) |
| _ | MF | (Uzbekistan) UZB | Timur Vasilyev (from Lokomotiv Tashkent) |
| _ | DF | (Uzbekistan) UZB | Aleksey Nikolaev (from (China) Shenzhen Ruby F.C.) |
| _ | MF | (Moldova) MDA | Denis Romanenco (from (Moldova) FC Mashuk-KMV Pyatigorsk) |

Out: Note: Flags indicate national team as defined under FIFA eligibility rules; some limited exceptions apply. Players may hold more than one non-FIFA nationality.

| No. | Pos. | Nation | Player |
|---|---|---|---|
| _ | MF | (Ukraine) UKR | Aleksei Dalinenko (free agent) |
| _ | DF | (Uzbekistan) UZB | Aleksandr Khvostunov (to FC Bunyodkor) |
| _ | MF | (Uzbekistan) UZB | Islom Akhmedov (to FK Andijan) |

=== FC Shurtan Guzar ===
In: Note: Flags indicate national team as defined under FIFA eligibility rules; some limited exceptions apply. Players may hold more than one non-FIFA nationality.

| No. | Pos. | Nation | Player |
|---|---|---|---|
| _ | MF | (Turkmenistan) TKM | Döwletmyrat Ataýew (from (Azerbaijan) FK Karvan) |
| _ | FW | (Uzbekistan) UZB | Shakhboz Erkinov (from (Iran) PAS Hamedan F.C.) |
| _ | DF | (Uzbekistan) UZB | Shavkat Raimqulov (from FC Bunyodkor) |
| _ | FW | (Uzbekistan) UZB | Viktor Klishin (from FK Andijan) |
| _ | GK | (Georgia (country)) GEO | Mikhale Alavidze (from (Georgia (country)) Olimpi Rustavi) |
| _ | DF | (Uzbekistan) UZB | Asror Aliqulov (from FC Pakhtakor Tashkent) |

Out: Note: Flags indicate national team as defined under FIFA eligibility rules; some limited exceptions apply. Players may hold more than one non-FIFA nationality.

| No. | Pos. | Nation | Player |
|---|---|---|---|
| _ | FW | (Georgia (country)) GEO | Grigoriy Megreladze (to (Georgia (country)) FC Baia Zugdidi) |
| _ | MF | (Uzbekistan) UZB | Bakhritdin Omonov (Unknown) |
| _ | FW | (Uzbekistan) UZB | Pavel Pavlov (Unknown) |
| _ | DF | (Uzbekistan) UZB | Alisher Yusupov (from Lokomotiv Tashkent) |
| _ | FW | (Uzbekistan) UZB | Zaynitdin Tadjiyev (to (Kazakhstan) FC Ordabasy) |

=== Xorazm FK Urganch ===
In: Note: Flags indicate national team as defined under FIFA eligibility rules; some limited exceptions apply. Players may hold more than one non-FIFA nationality.

| No. | Pos. | Nation | Player |
|---|---|---|---|
| _ | MF | (Uzbekistan) UZB | Rustam M. Azamov (from Lokomotiv Tashkent) |
| _ | MF | (Uzbekistan) UZB | Renat Bayramov (from FK Andijan) |
| _ | FW | (Uzbekistan) UZB | Tulqin Mirzaev (from Mash'al Mubarek) |
| _ | FW | (Georgia (country)) GEO | Lasha Kobakhidze (from (Georgia (country)) FC Chikhura Sachkhere) |
| _ | FW | (Turkmenistan) TKM | Guwançmuhammet Öwekow (from (Kazakhstan) FC Zhetysu) |

Out: Note: Flags indicate national team as defined under FIFA eligibility rules; some limited exceptions apply. Players may hold more than one non-FIFA nationality.

| No. | Pos. | Nation | Player |
|---|---|---|---|
| _ | MF | (Uzbekistan) UZB | Aziz Ibrohimov (to Lokomotiv Tashkent) |
| _ | FW | (Uzbekistan) UZB | Zafar Kholmurodov (to Nasaf Qarshi) |
| _ | FW | (Uzbekistan) UZB | Aziz Tukhtabayev (to Lokomotiv Tashkent) |
| _ | DF | (Georgia (country)) GEO | Mikheil Makhviladze (to (Georgia (country)) FC Kolkheti-1913 Poti) |
| _ | FW | (Georgia (country)) GEO | Levan Mdivnishvili (to (Georgia (country)) FK Ganja) |
| _ | DF | (Uzbekistan) UZB | Obid Djurabaev (to Lokomotiv Tashkent) |

== See also ==
- Uzbek League
- 2010 Uzbek League
