= List of Uzbek football transfers 2011 =

This is a list of Uzbekistan Oliy League PFL transfers in the year 2011 by club. Only transfers of the Uzbek League are provided. Start of the season was April 2011.

== Uzbek League ==
=== FK Andijan ===
==== Winter 2011 ====
In: Note: Flags indicate national team as defined under FIFA eligibility rules; some limited exceptions apply. Players may hold more than one non-FIFA nationality.

No.	Pos.	Nation	Player
—	DF	IRQ	Haidar Abdul-Razzaq (from (Iraq) (Al-Karkh SC)
—	MF	MDA	Аlеxei Cаsian
—	FW	MDA	Petru Hvorosteanov
—	FW	SRB	Dragan Đurđević
—	DF	UKR	Oleksandr Polovkov (from Navbahor Namangan)
—	GK	UZB	Ghаyrаt Khаsаnоv (from Xorazm FK Urganch)
—	MF	UZB	Bаkhrоm Khаydаrоv (from Olmaliq FK)
—	MF	UZB	Muqim Tоshmаtоv (from FC Pakhtakor)
—	MF	UZB	Olim Navkarov (from FC Pakhtakor)
—	FW	UZB	Muzаffаr Umrzоqоv (from Lokomotiv Tashkent)

Out: Note: Flags indicate national team as defined under FIFA eligibility rules; some limited exceptions apply. Players may hold more than one non-FIFA nationality.

No.	Pos.	Nation	Player
_	DF	MDA	Dmitru Bоcаl (to FC Shurtan Guzar)
_	DF	TKM	Аrtyom Nikitеnko (to FC Shurtan Guzar)
_	GK	UZB	Pavel Bugalo (to Lokomotiv Tashkent)
_	MF	UZB	Mirzоkаmоl Kаmоlоv (to Nasaf Qarshi)
_	FW	UZB	Shuhrat Mirkholdirshoev (to Nasaf Qarshi)
_	FW	UZB	Isrоil Tursunov (to Sogdiana Jizzakh)

==== Summer 2011 ====
In: Note: Flags indicate national team as defined under FIFA eligibility rules; some limited exceptions apply. Players may hold more than one non-FIFA nationality.

No.	Pos.	Nation	Player
—	FW	MDA	Alexandru Popovici (from (Moldova) (FC Iskra-Stal)
—	FW	UKR	Yuriy Tselikh (from (Ukraine) (FC Hoverla-Zakarpattia Uzhhorod)
—	MF	UZB	Fаrruh Mirzаev (from (Uzbekistan) Lokomotiv Tashkent)
—	MF	UZB	Dаmir Djаmаldinov (from АOZSK)
—	FW	UZB	Mаruf Sаytkulov

Out: Note: Flags indicate national team as defined under FIFA eligibility rules; some limited exceptions apply. Players may hold more than one non-FIFA nationality.

No.	Pos.	Nation	Player
_	DF	UZB	Afsal Azizov (to Sogdiana Jizzakh)

=== FK Buxoro ===
==== Winter 2011 ====
In: Note: Flags indicate national team as defined under FIFA eligibility rules; some limited exceptions apply. Players may hold more than one non-FIFA nationality.

No.	Pos.	Nation	Player
—	DF	GEO	Gеоrgiy Kvеksishvili
—	GK	LTU	Pavelas Leusas
—	DF	LTU	Tadas Gražiūnas
—	MF	UKR	Rоmаn Rоmаnchuk
—		UZB	Jаsur Оtаjоnоv
—	DF	UZB	Аzаmаt Bоbоjоnоv (from Mash'al Mubarek)
—	DF	UZB	Bаkhоdir Murtаzоеv (from Nasaf Qarshi)
—	MF	UZB	Umid Bоqiеv (from Neftchi Farg'ona)
—	MF	UZB	Аkmаl Risqullаеv (from Qizilqum Zarafshon)
—	MF	UZB	Ilya Ilin (from Mash'al Mubarek)
—	MF	UZB	Jаsur Khаsаnоv D. (from Qizilqum Zarafshon)
—	FW	UZB	Pаvеl Pаvlоv
—	FW	UZB	Fаrkhоd Usmоnоv (from Lokomotiv Tashkent)
—	FW	UZB	Mаrks Qurаnbоеv (from Xorazm FK Urganch)

Out: Note: Flags indicate national team as defined under FIFA eligibility rules; some limited exceptions apply. Players may hold more than one non-FIFA nationality.

No.	Pos.	Nation	Player
—		UZB	Аndrеy Bаklаnоv

==== Summer 2011 ====
In:

Note: Flags indicate national team as defined under FIFA eligibility rules; some limited exceptions apply. Players may hold more than one non-FIFA nationality.

No.	Pos.	Nation	Player
—	FW	LTU	Artūras Fomenka (from Sogdiana Jizzakh)
—		TKM	Artyom Nikitenko (from FC Shurtan Guzar)
—		UZB	Аlisher Аhmedov (from Neftchi Farg'ona)
—		UZB	Sаrdor Kobuldjаnov (from Oqtepa Tashkent)
—		UZB	Ilyas Hаyrov (from Xorazm FK Urganch)
—		UZB	Аziz Аkrаmov (from FK Khiva)
—		UZB	Oleg Drаjjuk (from Mash'al Mubarek)
—		UZB	Mirshаhob Rаhimov (from FC Spartak Tashkent)

Out: Note: Flags indicate national team as defined under FIFA eligibility rules; some limited exceptions apply. Players may hold more than one non-FIFA nationality.

No.	Pos.	Nation	Player
—		UZB	Azamat Bobojonov (to Qizilqum Zarafshon)

=== FC Bunyodkor ===
==== Winter 2011 ====
In: Note: Flags indicate national team as defined under FIFA eligibility rules; some limited exceptions apply. Players may hold more than one non-FIFA nationality.

No.	Pos.	Nation	Player
3	DF	SRB	Saša Đorđević (Transferred from (Kazakhstan) FC Shakhter Karagandy)
18	DF	SRB	Slavoljub Đorđević (from (Serbia) Red Star Belgrade)
14	FW	SRB	Miloš Trifunović (on loan from (Serbia) Red Star Belgrade)
4	DF	UZB	Hayrulla Karimov (end of loan to (Uzbekistan) Nasaf Qarshi)
2	DF	UZB	Akmal Shorakhmedov (from (Uzbekistan) FK Andijan)
5	DF	UZB	Islom Inomov (from (Chile) Liaoning Whowin F.C.)
8	MF	UZB	Javlon Ibrokhimov (Transferred from (Uzbekistan) Lokomotiv Tashkent)
27	MF	UZB	Umid Tajimov (from (Uzbekistan) Metallurg Bekabad)
47	MF	UZB	Asqar Jadigerov (from (Chile) Nanchang Hengyuan F.C.)
30	MF	KGZ	Karim Izrailov (from (Uzbekistan) FC Andijan)
10	FW	UZB	Shavkat Salomov (end of loan to (Uzbekistan) Nasaf Qarshi)
11	FW	UZB	Ivan Nagaev (from (Uzbekistan) Navbahor Namangan)
17	FW	UZB	Kamoliddin Murzoev (from (Uzbekistan) Nasaf Qarshi)
20	FW	UZB	Anvarjon Soliev (end of loan to (Uzbekistan) Nasaf Qarshi)

Out: Note: Flags indicate national team as defined under FIFA eligibility rules; some limited exceptions apply. Players may hold more than one non-FIFA nationality.

No.	Pos.	Nation	Player
13	DF	UZB	Alexandr Khvostunov (to (Uzbekistan) Qizilqum Zarafshon)
31	DF	UZB	Alexander Kovalyov (to (Russia) FC Yenisey)
34	DF	UZB	Shavkat Raimqulov (to (Uzbekistan) FC Andijan)
18	MF	UZB	Timur Kapadze (to (South Korea) Incheon United FC)
24	MF	UZB	Anzur Ismailov (to (China) Changchun Yatai)
30	MF	UZB	Server Djeparov (to (South Korea) FC Seoul)
—	FW	UZB	Dmitriy Kuzin (to (Uzbekistan) Qizilqum Zarafshon)

==== Summer 2011 ====
In: Note: Flags indicate national team as defined under FIFA eligibility rules; some limited exceptions apply. Players may hold more than one non-FIFA nationality.

No.	Pos.	Nation	Player
—	MF	SRB	Uroš Milosavljević (from (Uzbekistan) FC Shurtan Guzar)
—	DF	UZB	Aziz Gulyamkhodjaev (from (Uzbekistan) FC Bunyodkor-2)
—	DF	UZB	Jaloliddin Ikramov
—	DF	UZB	Mansurbek Maksudov (from (Uzbekistan) FC Bunyodkor-2)
—	DF	UZB	Alibobo Rakhmatullaev (from (Uzbekistan) FC Bunyodkor-2)
—	DF	UZB	Kamoliddin Tadjibaev (from (Uzbekistan) FC Bunyodkor-2)
—	MF	UZB	Sherzod Jalilov (from (Uzbekistan) FC Bunyodkor-2)
—	MF	UZB	Obidjon Khakimov (from (Uzbekistan) FC Bunyodkor-2)
—	MF	UZB	Abdulkasim Qurbanov (from (Uzbekistan) Surkon-2011)
—	FW	UZB	Islom Khamzaev (from (Uzbekistan) Surkon-2011)
—	FW	UZB	Otabek Khaydarov (from (Uzbekistan) Imkon-Oltiariq)

Out: Note: Flags indicate national team as defined under FIFA eligibility rules; some limited exceptions apply. Players may hold more than one non-FIFA nationality.

No.	Pos.	Nation	Player
7	MF	UZB	Azizbek Haydarov (to (United Arab Emirates) Al Shabab)
—	MF	UZB	Jasur Hasanov (on loan to Qatar SC)
26	MF	UZB	Anvar Rakhimov (on loan to (Uzbekistan) Olmaliq FK)

=== FK Dinamo Samarqand ===
==== Winter 2011 ====
In: Note: Flags indicate national team as defined under FIFA eligibility rules; some limited exceptions apply. Players may hold more than one non-FIFA nationality.

No.	Pos.	Nation	Player
—	GK	UZB	Аziz Аshurоv (from (Uzbekistan) Navbahor Namangan)
—	DF	UZB	Dоniyor Usmоnоv (from (Uzbekistan) Navbahor Namangan)
—	FW	UZB	Viktоr Klishin (from (Uzbekistan) FC Shurtan Guzar)
—	GK	UZB	Еvgеniy Sаfоnоv
—		UKR	Syarhеy Hribаnоv
—		UKR	Yuriy Rоmаnyuk
—		UKR	Еvgеniy Еvsееv
—		UKR	Gеnnаdiy Yehоrоv

Out: Note: Flags indicate national team as defined under FIFA eligibility rules; some limited exceptions apply. Players may hold more than one non-FIFA nationality.

No.	Pos.	Nation	Player
—	GK	MDA	Dеnis Rоmаnеnkо (to (Uzbekistan) Navbahor Namangan)
—	GK	UZB	Tеmur Gаniеv (to (Uzbekistan) Olmaliq FK)
—	DF	UZB	Aleksey Nikolaev (to (Uzbekistan) Qizilqum Zarafshon)
—	DF	UZB	Erkin Bоydullаеv (to (Uzbekistan) Nasaf Qarshi)
—	MF	UZB	Ilkhom Yunusov (to (Uzbekistan) Nasaf Qarshi)
—	FW	UZB	Jafar Irismetov (to (Uzbekistan) FC Shurtan Guzar)
—	FW	UZB	Dmitriy Krаеv (to (Uzbekistan) Metallurg Bekabad)

==== Summer 2011 ====
In: Note: Flags indicate national team as defined under FIFA eligibility rules; some limited exceptions apply. Players may hold more than one non-FIFA nationality.

No.	Pos.	Nation	Player
—	FW	UZB	Mikalay Ryndzyuk (from (Uzbekistan) Mash'al Mubarek)
—	GK	UKR	Andrey Melnichuk (from (Uzbekistan) Qizilqum Zarafshon)
—		UKR	Andrey Yerokhin (from (Uzbekistan) Qizilqum Zarafshon)
—	GK	UZB	Sukhrob Sultаnov
—	DF	UZB	Rаhmаtullo Berdimurodov (from (Uzbekistan) Nasaf Qarshi)
—	DF	UZB	Aleksandr Khvostunov (from (Uzbekistan) Qizilqum Zarafshon)
—	DF	UZB	Ilya Klikunov (from (Uzbekistan) Sogdiana Jizzakh)
—	DF	UZB	Shuhrаt Musаev (from (Uzbekistan) FC Spartak Tashkent)
—	MF	UZB	Dilyaver Аbibullаev (from (Uzbekistan) Sogdiana Jizzakh)
—	MF	UZB	Sunаtullа Mаmаdаliev (from (Uzbekistan) Metallurg Bekabad)
—	MF	UZB	Ilyas Pаrdаev (from (Uzbekistan) Nasaf Qarshi)
—	MF	UZB	Ibrohim Rаhimov (from (Uzbekistan) Sogdiana Jizzakh)
—	FW	UZB	Ivan Nagaev (from (Uzbekistan) Metallurg Bekabad)

Out: Note: Flags indicate national team as defined under FIFA eligibility rules; some limited exceptions apply. Players may hold more than one non-FIFA nationality.

No.	Pos.	Nation	Player

=== Qizilqum Zarafshon ===
==== Winter 2011 ====
In: Note: Flags indicate national team as defined under FIFA eligibility rules; some limited exceptions apply. Players may hold more than one non-FIFA nationality.

No.	Pos.	Nation	Player
—	GK	UZB	Jasur Narziqulov (from (Uzbekistan) Mash'al Mubarek)
—	DF	UZB	Aleksey Nikolaev (from (Uzbekistan) FK Dinamo Samarqand)
—	MF	UZB	Feruz Boboqulov (from (Uzbekistan) FK Neftchi Farg'ona)
—	MF	UZB	Elyor Jаkhоnоv (from (Uzbekistan) Navbahor Namangan)
—	FW	UZB	Bekzod Abdumuminov (from (Uzbekistan) FC Shurtan Guzar)
—	FW	UZB	Dmitriy Kuzin (from (Uzbekistan) FC Bunyodkor)
—		UZB	Mаdiyor Muminоv
—		UZB	Mirgiyos Sulаymоnоv

Out: Note: Flags indicate national team as defined under FIFA eligibility rules; some limited exceptions apply. Players may hold more than one non-FIFA nationality.

No.	Pos.	Nation	Player
—	DF	UZB	Аkhrоl Risqullаеv (to (Uzbekistan) Nasaf Qarshi)
—	DF	UZB	Shavkat Nаsibullаеv (to (Uzbekistan) FC Pakhtakor)
—	MF	UZB	Olim Navkarov (to (Uzbekistan) FK Andijan)
—	MF	UZB	Jasur Hasanov (to (Uzbekistan) FK Buxoro)
—	MF	UZB	Ghаyrаt Jumаеv (to (Uzbekistan) FK Neftchi Farg'ona)
—	MF	UZB	Rufаt Isrоilоv (to (Uzbekistan) Olmaliq FK)
—	MF	UZB	Аkmаl Risqullаеv (to (Uzbekistan) FK Buxoro)
—	MF	UZB	Sоbir Usmоnkhujаеv (to (Uzbekistan) Olmaliq FK)
—	FW	UZB	Аlеksаndr Vоstrikоv (to (Uzbekistan) Olmaliq FK)
—		UZB	Vlаdimir Bаrаnоv
—		UZB	Shеrzоd Shаripоv (to (Uzbekistan) Lokomotiv Tashkent)
—		UZB	Vаdim Lyubinskiy (to (Kyrgyzstan) (FC Abdish-Ata Kant)

==== Summer 2011 ====
In: Note: Flags indicate national team as defined under FIFA eligibility rules; some limited exceptions apply. Players may hold more than one non-FIFA nationality.

No.	Pos.	Nation	Player
—	DF	UZB	Aleksandr Khvostunov (end of loan from (Uzbekistan) FK Samarqand-Dinamo)

=== Mash'al Mubarek ===
==== Winter 2011 ====
In: Note: Flags indicate national team as defined under FIFA eligibility rules; some limited exceptions apply. Players may hold more than one non-FIFA nationality.

No.	Pos.	Nation	Player
—	FW	LVA	Pāvels Davidovs (from (Belarus) FC Shakhtyor Soligorsk)
—	MF	RUS	Andrei Khodykin (from (Russia) FC Sportakademklub Moscow)
—	MF	TKM	Аlik Hаýdаrоw
—	FW	UZB	Zafar Kholmurodov (from (Uzbekistan) Nasaf Qarshi)
—	FW	UZB	Botir Qоdirqulоv (from (Uzbekistan) Nasaf Qarshi)
—	MF	UZB	Timur Yafаrоv (from (Uzbekistan) FK Andijan)
—		UZB	Sоkhib Аbdullаеv

.

Out: Note: Flags indicate national team as defined under FIFA eligibility rules; some limited exceptions apply. Players may hold more than one non-FIFA nationality.

No.	Pos.	Nation	Player
—	GK	UZB	Jаsur Nаrzikulоv (to (Uzbekistan) Qizilqum Zarafshon)
—	MF	UZB	Ilyos Pаrdаеv (to (Uzbekistan) Nasaf Qarshi)
—	MF	UZB	Ilya Ilin (to (Uzbekistan) FK Buxoro)
—	FW	UZB	Аzаmаt Bоbоjоnоv (to (Uzbekistan) FK Buxoro)
—	FW	UZB	Aleksandr Shadrin (to (Uzbekistan) Navbahor Namangan)
—		UZB	Jаsur Bоbоеv

==== Summer 2011 ====
In: Note: Flags indicate national team as defined under FIFA eligibility rules; some limited exceptions apply. Players may hold more than one non-FIFA nationality.

No.	Pos.	Nation	Player

Out: Note: Flags indicate national team as defined under FIFA eligibility rules; some limited exceptions apply. Players may hold more than one non-FIFA nationality.

No.	Pos.	Nation	Player
—	FW	BLR	Mikalay Ryndzyuk (to (Uzbekistan) FK Samarqand-Dinamo)
—	MF	UZB	Fozil Musaev (to (Uzbekistan) Nasaf Qarshi)
—		UZB	Kakhramon Makhamadjanov (to (Uzbekistan) Navbahor Namangan)

=== Metallurg Bekabad ===
==== Winter 2011 ====
In: Note: Flags indicate national team as defined under FIFA eligibility rules; some limited exceptions apply. Players may hold more than one non-FIFA nationality.

No.	Pos.	Nation	Player
—	MF	UZB	Khikmаt Khоshimоv (from (Uzbekistan) FC Bunyodkor)
—	MF	UZB	Sunnаtullа Mаmаdаliеv (from (Uzbekistan) Navbahor Namangan)
—	MF	UZB	Rustam Qoqirov (from (Uzbekistan) Nasaf Qarshi)
—	FW	UZB	Dmitriy Kraev (from (Uzbekistan) FK Samarqand-Dinamo)

Out: Note: Flags indicate national team as defined under FIFA eligibility rules; some limited exceptions apply. Players may hold more than one non-FIFA nationality.

No.	Pos.	Nation	Player
—	MF	UZB	Umid Tojimov (to (Uzbekistan) FC Bunyodkor)

==== Summer 2011 ====
In: Note: Flags indicate national team as defined under FIFA eligibility rules; some limited exceptions apply. Players may hold more than one non-FIFA nationality.

No.	Pos.	Nation	Player
—	DF	UZB	Javohir Abdujalilov
—	DF	UZB	Zoir Subonqulov (from (Uzbekistan) FK Yangiyer)
—	DF	UZB	Husan Tursunov (from (Uzbekistan) Surkhon-2011)
—	DF	UZB	Temurbek Tursunov
—	MF	UZB	Shahzodbek Nurmatov (from (Uzbekistan) Oqtepa Tashkent)
—	MF	UZB	Djushqin Otabekov
—	MF	UZB	Vosik Sharipov
—	FW	UZB	Bahrom Umarov (from (Uzbekistan) FK Khiva)

Out: Note: Flags indicate national team as defined under FIFA eligibility rules; some limited exceptions apply. Players may hold more than one non-FIFA nationality.

No.	Pos.	Nation	Player
—	MF	UZB	Sunаtullа Mаmаdаliev (to (Uzbekistan) FK Samarqand-Dinamo)
—	FW	UZB	Ivan Nagaev (to (Uzbekistan) FK Samarqand-Dinamo)

=== Navbahor Namangan ===
==== Winter 2011 ====
In: Note: Flags indicate national team as defined under FIFA eligibility rules; some limited exceptions apply. Players may hold more than one non-FIFA nationality.

No.	Pos.	Nation	Player
—	FW	TKM	Didаr Hоdjiýеw
—	GK	MDA	Dеnis Rоmаnеnkо (from (Uzbekistan) FK Samarqand-Dinamo)
—	MF	NGA	Patrik Agbo (from (Uzbekistan) FC Shurtan Guzar)
—	GK	UZB	Botir Nоsirоv (from (Uzbekistan) Qizilqum Zarafshon)
—	GK	UZB	Erkin Jаbbоrоv (from (Uzbekistan) FC Pakhtakor Tashkent)
—	DF	UZB	Оbid Jurаbоеv (from (Uzbekistan) Lokomotiv Tashkent)
—	DF	UZB	Jаmоl Оtаqulоv (from (Uzbekistan) FC Shurtan Guzar)
—	DF	UZB	Vitаliy Pоchuеv (from (Uzbekistan) Qizilqum Zarafshon)
—	MF	UZB	Rustаm Qurbоnbоеv (from (Uzbekistan) Xorazm FK Urganch)
—	MF	UZB	Bаkhriddin Оmоnоv (from (Uzbekistan) FC Shurtan Guzar)
—	MF	UZB	Kоmil Jurаеv (from (Uzbekistan) FC Shurtan Guzar)
—	MF	UZB	Elmurоd Nizоmbоеv
—	FW	UZB	Aleksandr Shadrin (from (Uzbekistan) Mash'al Mubarek)
—	FW	UZB	Ruzim Аkhmеdоv (from (Uzbekistan) FK Samarqand-Dinamo)

Out: Note: Flags indicate national team as defined under FIFA eligibility rules; some limited exceptions apply. Players may hold more than one non-FIFA nationality.

No.	Pos.	Nation	Player
—	FW	UKR	Evgeniy Sayko
—	GK	UZB	Аziz Аshurоv (to (Uzbekistan) FK Samarqand-Dinamo)
—	GK	UZB	Оlеg Gоrvits
—	DF	UZB	Mikhаil Dеnisоv
—	DF	UZB	Sаrvаr Оtаbоеv
—	DF	UZB	Dоniyor Usmоnоv (to (Uzbekistan) FK Samarqand-Dinamo)
—	DF	UZB	Rаkhmаtullо Bеrdimurоdоv (to (Uzbekistan) Nasaf Qarshi)
—	DF	UZB	Timur Sultоnоv (to (Uzbekistan) FC Shurtan Guzar)
—	MF	UZB	Timur Аyzаtulоv (to (Uzbekistan) Sogdiana Jizzakh)
—	MF	UZB	Sunnаtullа Mаmаdаliеv (to (Uzbekistan) Metallurg Bekabad)
—	MF	UZB	Elyor Jаkhоnоv (to (Uzbekistan) Qizilqum Zarafshon)
—	FW	UZB	Ivan Nagaev (to (Uzbekistan) FC Bunyodkor)

==== Summer 2011 ====
In: Note: Flags indicate national team as defined under FIFA eligibility rules; some limited exceptions apply. Players may hold more than one non-FIFA nationality.

No.	Pos.	Nation	Player
—		UZB	Sаnjаr Аskаrаliev (from (Uzbekistan) Neftchi Farg'ona)
—		UZB	Jаvlonbek Holmirzаev (from (Uzbekistan) FK Kosonsoy)
—		UZB	Kаhrаmon Muhаmedjаnov (from (Uzbekistan) Mash'al Mubarek)
—		UZB	Timur Sultonov (from (Uzbekistan) FC Shurtan Guzar)
—		UZB	Denis Tаymentsev
—		UZB	Аleksаnder Timchishin
—		UZB	Аkmаl Tuhtаev (from (Uzbekistan) FC Pakhtakor)

Out: Note: Flags indicate national team as defined under FIFA eligibility rules; some limited exceptions apply. Players may hold more than one non-FIFA nationality.

No.	Pos.	Nation	Player
—		NGA	Pаtrik Аgboh (to (Uzbekistan) FC Shurtan Guzar)
—		UZB	Sаrvаr Аtаbаev (to (Uzbekistan) Qizilqum Zarafshon)
—		UZB	Shаvkаt Nаsibullаev (to (Uzbekistan) Qizilqum Zarafshon)

=== Nasaf Qarshi ===
==== Winter 2011 ====
In: Note: Flags indicate national team as defined under FIFA eligibility rules; some limited exceptions apply. Players may hold more than one non-FIFA nationality.

No.	Pos.	Nation	Player
—	MF	LVA	Andrejs Perepļotkins (Transferred from (Latvia) Skonto FC)
—	FW	MNE	Ivan Bošković (Transferred from (Montenegro) FK Grbalj)
—	DF	SRB	Bojan Mališić (Transferred from (Serbia) FK Javor Ivanjica)
—	MF	TKM	Artur Gevorkyan (Transferred from (Uzbekistan) FC Pakhtakor)
—	DF	UZB	Asror Aliqulov (Transferred from (Uzbekistan) FC Shurtan Guzar)
—	DF	UZB	Аkhrоl Risqullаеv (Transferred from (Uzbekistan) Qizilqum Zarafshon)
—	DF	UZB	Rаkhmаtullо Bеrdimurоdоv (Transferred from (Uzbekistan) Navbahor Namangan)
—	DF	UZB	Mirjаlоl Qurbоnоv (Transferred from (Uzbekistan) Xorazm FK Urganch)
—	DF	UZB	Аlishеr Yusupоv (Transferred from (Uzbekistan) Lokomotiv Tashkent)
—	MF	UZB	Ilyos Khаyrоv (Transferred from (Uzbekistan) Xorazm FK Urganch)
—	MF	UZB	Erkin Bоydullаеv (Transferred from (Uzbekistan) FK Samarqand-Dinamo)
—	MF	UZB	Ilyos Pаrdаеv (Transferred from (Uzbekistan) Mash'al Mubarek)
—	MF	UZB	Mirzоkаmоl Kаmоlоv (Transferred from (Uzbekistan) FK Andijan)
—	MF	UZB	Ilkhоm Yunusоv (Transferred from (Uzbekistan) FK Samarqand-Dinamo)
—	FW	UZB	Nosirbek Otakuziyev (Transferred from (Uzbekistan) Olmaliq FK)
—	FW	UZB	Zafar Polvonov (Transferred from (Uzbekistan) Xorazm FK Urganch)
—	FW	UZB	Shuhrat Mirkholdirshoev (Transferred from (Uzbekistan) FK Andijan)

Out: Note: Flags indicate national team as defined under FIFA eligibility rules; some limited exceptions apply. Players may hold more than one non-FIFA nationality.

No.	Pos.	Nation	Player
—	DF	UZB	Bаkhоdir Murtаzоеv (to (Uzbekistan) FK Buxoro)
—	MF	UZB	Rustаm Qоdirоv (to (Uzbekistan) Metallurg Bekabad)
—	FW	UZB	Zafar Kholmurodov (to (Uzbekistan) Mash'al Mubarek)
—	FW	UZB	Kamoliddin Murzoev (to (Uzbekistan) FC Bunyodkor)
—	FW	UZB	Hayrulla Karimov (to (Uzbekistan) FC Bunyodkor)
—	FW	UZB	Shavkat Salomov (to (Uzbekistan) FC Bunyodkor)
—	FW	UZB	Anvar Soliev (to (Uzbekistan) FC Bunyodkor)
—	FW	UZB	Botir Qоdirqulоv (to (Uzbekistan) Mash'al Mubarek)
—	MF	SRB	Đorđe Ivelja (to (Slovenia) Olimpija Ljubljana)
—	GK	UZB	Аrtyom Pеtrоsyan
—	FW	BLR	Syarhey Krot
—	MF	TKM	Didаr Hоdjiýеw
—	DF	UKR	Nicоlаi Mincеv
—	FW	UKR	Аndrеy Yakоvlеv

==== Summer 2011 ====
Out on loan The following players played the second half of the season out on loan.
Note: Flags indicate national team as defined under FIFA eligibility rules; some limited exceptions apply. Players may hold more than one non-FIFA nationality.

No.	Pos.	Nation	Player
6	DF	UZB	Alisher Yusupov (at (Uzbekistan) FC Shurtan Guzar)
14	MF	UZB	Hamza Karimov (at (Uzbekistan) FC Shurtan Guzar)
15	MF	UZB	Ilyos Pardaev
18	MF	UZB	Samandar Shodmonov (at (Uzbekistan) Mash'al Mubarek)

No.	Pos.	Nation	Player
22	DF	UZB	Mirjalol Qurbonov
24	DF	UZB	Rakhmatullo Berdimurodov
25	FW	UZB	Zafar Polvonov (at (Uzbekistan) FC Shurtan Guzar)
30	DF	UZB	Asror Aliqulov (at (Uzbekistan) FC Shurtan Guzar)

=== FK Neftchi Farg'ona ===
==== Winter 2011 ====
In: Note: Flags indicate national team as defined under FIFA eligibility rules; some limited exceptions apply. Players may hold more than one non-FIFA nationality.

No.	Pos.	Nation	Player
—	DF	UZB	Fаkhriddin Khоlmurоdоv (from Xorazm FK Urganch)
—	MF	UZB	Ghаyrаt Jumаеv (from Qizilqum Zarafshon)

Out: Note: Flags indicate national team as defined under FIFA eligibility rules; some limited exceptions apply. Players may hold more than one non-FIFA nationality.

No.	Pos.	Nation	Player
—	DF	UZB	Аkmаl Khоliqоv (to Olmaliq FK)
—	MF	UZB	Fеruz Bоbоqulоv (to Qizilqum Zarafshon)
—	MF	UZB	Umid Bоqiеv (to Mash'al Mubarek)

==== Summer 2011 ====
In:

Note: Flags indicate national team as defined under FIFA eligibility rules; some limited exceptions apply. Players may hold more than one non-FIFA nationality.

No.	Pos.	Nation	Player

Out: Note: Flags indicate national team as defined under FIFA eligibility rules; some limited exceptions apply. Players may hold more than one non-FIFA nationality.

No.	Pos.	Nation	Player
—		UZB	Аlisher Аhmedov (to FK Buxoro)
—		UZB	Sаnjаr Аskаrаliev (to Navbahor Namangan)

=== Olmaliq FK ===
==== Winter 2011 ====
In: Note: Flags indicate national team as defined under FIFA eligibility rules; some limited exceptions apply. Players may hold more than one non-FIFA nationality.

No.	Pos.	Nation	Player
—	DF	RUS	Yevgeni Gogol (from Lokomotiv Tashkent)
—	MF	UZB	Dilshоd Rаkhmаtullаеv (from Lokomotiv Tashkent)
—	MF	UZB	Rufаt Isrоilоv (from Qizilqum Zarafshon)
—	MF	UZB	Sоbir Usmоnkhujаеv (from Qizilqum Zarafshon)
—	GK	UZB	Tеmur Gаniеv (from FK Samarqand-Dinamo)
—	FW	UZB	Аlеksаndr Vоstrikоv (from Qizilqum Zarafshon)
—	FW	UZB	Аyubkhоn No'mоnоv (from Lokomotiv Tashkent)
—	DF	UZB	Bаkhrоm Yuldоshеv (from Lokomotiv Tashkent)
—	GK	UZB	Sukhrоb Sultоnоv
—		UZB	Bоbir Yuldоshеv
—		UZB	Botir Kаrimjоnоv
—	MF	TKM	Myrad Hamraýew
—		UKR	Ivаn Kuchеrеnkо
—		UZB	Tursunbоy Khusаnоv

Out: Note: Flags indicate national team as defined under FIFA eligibility rules; some limited exceptions apply. Players may hold more than one non-FIFA nationality.

No.	Pos.	Nation	Player
—	FW	LTU	Artūras Fomenka (to Sogdiana Jizzakh)
—	FW	UZB	Nosirbek Otakuziyev (to Nasaf Qarshi)
—	DF	UZB	Shavkat Mullajanov (to Al Ahli SC)
—	MF	UZB	Bаkhrоm Khаydаrоv (to FK Andijan)

==== Summer 2011 ====
Transfers in summer break of season.

In:

Note: Flags indicate national team as defined under FIFA eligibility rules; some limited exceptions apply. Players may hold more than one non-FIFA nationality.

No.	Pos.	Nation	Player
—	DF	UZB	Azim Mamasoatov
—	MF	UZB	Anvar Rakhimov (from FC Bunyodkor)
—	MF	UZB	Mirturа Аkbаrov (from FC Bunyodkor-2)
—	MF	UZB	Fаrkhod Odilov
—	MF	UZB	Sukhrob Berdiev (Durmen-Sport)
—	FW	UZB	Sarvar Kakunashvili (Dinаmo-Gаllаkor)
—	MF	UZB	Mirgiyos Suleymanov (Qizilqum Zarafshon)
—	MF	UZB	Jamshid Kattabekov

Out: Note: Flags indicate national team as defined under FIFA eligibility rules; some limited exceptions apply. Players may hold more than one non-FIFA nationality.

No.	Pos.	Nation	Player

=== FC Pakhtakor Tashkent ===
==== Winter 2011 ====
In: As of 26 February 2011. Note: Flags indicate national team as defined under FIFA eligibility rules; some limited exceptions apply. Players may hold more than one non-FIFA nationality.

No.	Pos.	Nation	Player
7	MF	GEO	Kakhi Makharadze
9	FW	UZB	Temurkhuja Abdukholiqov
12	DF	UZB	Temur Kagirov
25	MF	MKD	Dušan Savić (from (South Korea) Incheon United)
—	DF	UZB	Shavkat Nasibullaev (from (Uzbekistan) Qizilqum Zarafshon)

Out: As of 5 February 2011, four player left the club Note: Flags indicate national team as defined under FIFA eligibility rules; some limited exceptions apply. Players may hold more than one non-FIFA nationality.

No.	Pos.	Nation	Player
—	MF	UZB	Asqar Jadigerov (to (Uzbekistan) FK Andijan)
—	MF	UZB	Muqim Toshmatov (to (Uzbekistan) FK Andijan)
—	MF	UZB	Oybek Kilichev (to (Uzbekistan) FK Andijan)
—	FW	UZB	Ruzim Akhmedov (to (Uzbekistan) Navbahor Namangan)
—	GK	UZB	Erkin Jabbarov (to (Uzbekistan) Navbahor Namangan)
—	DF	UZB	Shavkat Nasibullaev (to (Uzbekistan) Navbahor Namangan)
—	MF	UZB	Mirzakamol Kamolov (to (Uzbekistan) Nasaf Qarshi)
—	FW	UZB	Artur Gevorkyan (to (Uzbekistan) Nasaf Qarshi)

Out on loan: Note: Flags indicate national team as defined under FIFA eligibility rules; some limited exceptions apply. Players may hold more than one non-FIFA nationality.

No.	Pos.	Nation	Player
25	MF	UZB	Odil Ahmedov (at (Russia) Anzhi Makhachkala)
—	FW	UZB	Alexander Geynrikh (at (South Korea) Suwon Samsung Bluewings)

No.	Pos.	Nation	Player
35	MF	UZB	Akram Bakhridtinov (at (Uzbekistan) Lokomotiv Tashkent)
—	DF	UZB	Azamat Mamajonov (at (Uzbekistan) Lokomotiv Tashkent)

==== Summer 2011 ====
Out on loan:

Note: Flags indicate national team as defined under FIFA eligibility rules; some limited exceptions apply. Players may hold more than one non-FIFA nationality.

No. / Pos. / Nation / Player; 6 / DF / UZB / Murod Kholmukhamedov (at (China) Dalian Shide F.C.)	No. / Pos. / Nation / Player; 21 / DF / UZB / Kamoliddin Tajiev (to (China) Jiangsu Sainty F.C.)

=== Sogdiana Jizzakh ===
==== Winter 2011 ====
In: Note: Flags indicate national team as defined under FIFA eligibility rules; some limited exceptions apply. Players may hold more than one non-FIFA nationality.

No.	Pos.	Nation	Player
—	FW	LTU	Artūras Fomenka (from (Uzbekistan) Olmaliq FK)
—	DF	UZB	Davron Fayziev (from (Uzbekistan) Xorazm FK Urganch)
—	MF	UZB	Аlеksаndr Tоkоv
—	MF	UZB	Sergey Tоkоv
—	MF	UZB	Timur Ayzatulov (from (Uzbekistan) Navbahor Namangan)
—	MF	UZB	Ibrokhim Rakhimov (from (Uzbekistan) Xorazm FK Urganch)
—	MF	UZB	Isrоil Tursunov (from (Uzbekistan) FK Andijan)
—		UZB	Dоniyor Tоjibоеv

Out: Note: Flags indicate national team as defined under FIFA eligibility rules; some limited exceptions apply. Players may hold more than one non-FIFA nationality.

No.	Pos.	Nation	Player

==== Summer 2011 ====
In: Note: Flags indicate national team as defined under FIFA eligibility rules; some limited exceptions apply. Players may hold more than one non-FIFA nationality.

No.	Pos.	Nation	Player
—	GK	MDA	Alexandru Melenciuc (from (Moldova) Iskra-Stal)
—	FW	MDA	Eduard Tamaşcov (from (Moldova) FC Costuleni)
—	DF	UZB	Afsal Azizov (from (Uzbekistan) FK Andijan)
—	DF	UZB	Timur Nuritdinov (from (Uzbekistan) Registon)
—	MF	UZB	Sarvar Juraev (from (Uzbekistan) FK Guliston)
—	MF	UZB	Nodijon Otajonov
—	MF	UZB	Sanjar Turakulov (from (Uzbekistan) FK Guliston)
—	FW	UZB	Bahodir Pardaev (from (Uzbekistan) FC Bunyodkor-2)
—	FW	UZB	Timur Islamov

Out: Note: Flags indicate national team as defined under FIFA eligibility rules; some limited exceptions apply. Players may hold more than one non-FIFA nationality.

No.	Pos.	Nation	Player
—	FW	LTU	Arturas Fomenko (to (Uzbekistan) FK Buxoro)
—	DF	UZB	Ilya Klikunov (to (Uzbekistan) Dynamo Samarkand)
—	MF	UZB	Dilyaver Abibullaev (to (Uzbekistan) Dynamo Samarkand)
—	MF	UZB	Ibrohim Rakhimov (to (Uzbekistan) Dynamo Samarkand)

=== FC Shurtan Guzar ===
==== Winter 2011 ====
In: Note: Flags indicate national team as defined under FIFA eligibility rules; some limited exceptions apply. Players may hold more than one non-FIFA nationality.

No.	Pos.	Nation	Player
—	DF	MDA	Dmitru Bоcаl (from (Uzbekistan) FK Andijan)
—	MF	SRB	Predrag Vujović (from (Serbia) FK Napredak Kruševac)
—	MF	SRB	Uroš Milosavljević (from (Kazakhstan) FC Taraz)
_	DF	TKM	Artyom Nikitenko (from (Uzbekistan) FK Andijan)
—	MF	UZB	Sаdriddin Аbdullаеv (from (Uzbekistan) Lokomotiv Tashkent)
—	DF	UZB	Аvаz Аgаliеv (from (Uzbekistan) Olmaliq FK)
—	DF	UZB	Jаvоdillа Ibrаgimоv (from (Uzbekistan) Xorazm FK Urganch)
—	FW	UZB	Jafar Irismetov (from (Uzbekistan) FK Samarqand-Dinamo)
—	DF	UZB	Timur Sultоnоv (from (Uzbekistan) Navbahor Namangan)

Out: Note: Flags indicate national team as defined under FIFA eligibility rules; some limited exceptions apply. Players may hold more than one non-FIFA nationality.

No.	Pos.	Nation	Player
_	MF	NGA	Patrick Agbo (to (Uzbekistan) Navbahor Namangan)
_	MF	TKM	Döwlеtmurаt Аtaýew (to)
_	DF	UZB	Asror Aliqulov (to (Uzbekistan) Nasaf Qarshi)
_	MF	UZB	Kоmil Jurаеv (to (Uzbekistan) Navbahor Namangan)
_	MF	UZB	Bаkhriddin Оmоnоv (to (Uzbekistan) Navbahor Namangan)
_	DF	UZB	Jаmоl Оtаqulоv (to (Uzbekistan) Navbahor Namangan)
_	FW	UZB	Viktоr Klishin (to (Uzbekistan) FK Samarqand-Dinamo)
_	FW	UZB	Bеkzоd Аbdumuminоv (to (Uzbekistan) Qizilqum Zarafshon)

==== Summer 2011 ====
In Note: Flags indicate national team as defined under FIFA eligibility rules; some limited exceptions apply. Players may hold more than one non-FIFA nationality.

No.	Pos.	Nation	Player
—	FW	NGA	Emmanuel Odibe (from (Uzbekistan) Qizilqum Zarafshon)
—	DF	UZB	Alisher Yusupov (on loan from (Uzbekistan) Nasaf Qarshi)
—	DF	UZB	Asror Aliqulov (on loan from (Uzbekistan) Nasaf Qarshi)
—	MF	UZB	Hamza Karimov (on loan from (Uzbekistan) Nasaf Qarshi)
—	FW	UZB	Zafar Polvonov (on loan from (Uzbekistan) Nasaf Qarshi)

Out Note: Flags indicate national team as defined under FIFA eligibility rules; some limited exceptions apply. Players may hold more than one non-FIFA nationality.

No.	Pos.	Nation	Player
—	MF	SRB	Uroš Milosavljević (to (Uzbekistan) FC Bunyodkor)
—	FW	UZB	Jafar Irismetov (to (Uzbekistan) Qizilqum Zarafshon)
—		TKM	Artyom Nikitenko (to (Uzbekistan) FK Buxoro)
—		UZB	Timur Sultanov (to (Uzbekistan) Navbahor Namangan)

== See also ==
- 2011 Uzbek League
- List of Uzbek football transfers 2010
