= 2011 FC Bunyodkor season =

FC Bunyodkor
2011 season
- Chairman: Tulagan Djuraev
- Manager: Mirjalol Kasymov
- Uzbek League: 1st - Champions
- Uzbekistan Cup: Semi-final vs Nasaf Qarshi
- AFC Champions League: Last 16 vs Sepahan
- Top goalscorer: League: Miloš Trifunović (17); All: Miloš Trifunović (22)
| Home colours | Away colours |

The 2011 season was Bunyodkors 5th season in the Uzbek League, which the finished as champions for the 4th time. They also competed in the 2011 Uzbekistan Cup getting knocked out in the Semi-final stages by Nasaf Qarshi. The participated in the 2011 AFC Champions League, reaching the Last 16 stage before losing to Sepahan of Iran.

== Squad ==
As of match played 5 November 2011

| No. | Name | Nationality | Position | Date of birth (age) | Signed from | Signed in | Contract ends | Apps. | Goals |
Goalkeepers
| 1 | Ignatiy Nesterov | (Uzbekistan) | GK | 20 June 1983 (aged 28) | Pakhtakor Tashkent | 2009 | | 89 | 0 |
| 25 | Mukhiddin Khudoyorov | (Uzbekistan) | GK | 5 November 1990 (aged 21) | Youth Team | 2007 | | 1 | 0 |
| 45 | Akbar Turaev | (Uzbekistan) | GK | 27 August 1989 (aged 22) | Youth Team | 2010 | | 5 | 0 |
Defenders
| 2 | Akmal Shorakhmedov | (Uzbekistan) | DF | 22 April 1978 (aged 33) | Andijon | 2011 | | 27 | 1 |
| 3 | Saša Đorđević | (Serbia) | DF | 4 August 1981 (aged 30) | Shakhter Karagandy | 2011 | | 15 | 1 |
| 4 | Hayrulla Karimov | (Uzbekistan) | DF | 22 April 1978 (aged 33) | Mash'al Mubarek | 2008 | | 84+ | 4+ |
| 5 | Islom Inomov | (Uzbekistan) | DF | 30 May 1984 (aged 27) | Liaoning Whowin | 2011 | | 23 | 0 |
| 6 | Anvar Gafurov | (Uzbekistan) | DF | 14 May 1982 (aged 29) | Mash'al Mubarek | 2009 | | 106 | 2 |
| 18 | Slavoljub Đorđević | (Serbia) | DF | 15 February 1981 (aged 30) | Red Star Belgrade | 2011 | | 33 | 0 |
| | Dilshod Juraev | (Uzbekistan) | DF | 21 April 1992 (aged 19) | Youth Team | 2011 | | 5 | 0 |
Midfielders
| 8 | Jovlon Ibrokhimov | (Uzbekistan) | MF | 13 November 1985 (aged 25) | Lokomotiv Tashkent | 2011 | | 30 | 3 |
| 10 | Shavkat Salomov | (Uzbekistan) | MF | 13 November 1985 (aged 25) | Buxoro | 2007 | | 113+ | 19+ |
| 16 | Doniyor Khasanov | (Uzbekistan) | MF | 26 February 1990 (aged 21) | Youth Team | 2010 | | 12 | 2 |
| 19 | Yannis Mandzukas | (Uzbekistan) | MF | 8 April 1984 (aged 27) | Lokomotiv Tashkent | 2010 | | 57+ | 7+ |
| 22 | Victor Karpenko | (Uzbekistan) | MF | 7 September 1977 (aged 34) | Kairat | 2007 | | 158+ | 33+ |
| 27 | Umid Tajimov | (Uzbekistan) | MF | | Metallurg Bekabad | 2011 | | 0 | 0 |
| 28 | Ruslan Melziddinov | (Uzbekistan) | MF | 26 March 1985 (aged 26) | Neftchi Fergana | 2009 | | 51 | 2 |
| 47 | Asqar Jadigerov | (Uzbekistan) | MF | 5 January 1980 (aged 31) | Nanchang Hengyuan | 2011 | | 32 | 2 |
| | Uroš Milosavljević | (Serbia) | MF | 13 July 1982 (aged 29) | Shurtan Guzar | 2011 | | 8 | 0 |
| | Furqat Khasanboev | (Uzbekistan) | MF | 2 April 1992 (aged 19) | | 2011 | | 1 | 0 |
Forwards
| 9 | Anvar Rajabov | (Uzbekistan) | FW | 23 January 1988 (aged 23) | Buxoro | 2008 | | 47+ | 9+ |
| 14 | Miloš Trifunović | (Serbia) | FW | 15 October 1984 (aged 27) | loan from Red Star Belgrade | 2011 | | 36 | 22 |
| 15 | Miraziz Jalalov | (Uzbekistan) | FW | 22 January 1992 (aged 19) | Youth Team | 2007 | | 6+ | 1+ |
| 17 | Kamoliddin Murzoev | (Uzbekistan) | FW | 17 February 1987 (aged 24) | Nasaf | 2011 | | 32 | 3 |
| 20 | Anvarjon Soliev | (Uzbekistan) | FW | 5 February 1978 (aged 33) | Pakhtakor Tashkent | 2008 | | 120+ | 50+ |
| 21 | Sardor Rashidov | (Uzbekistan) | FW | 14 June 1991 (aged 20) | Sogdiana Jizzakh | 2010 | | 3 | 0 |
| 44 | Rasul Shukhratov | (Uzbekistan) | FW | 8 August 1992 (aged 19) | Youth Team | 2010 | | 8 | 1 |
Out on Loan
| 26 | Anvar Rakhimov | (Uzbekistan) | MF | 20 February 1988 (aged 23) | Xorazm FK Urganch | 2007 | | 26+ | 4+ |
| 29 | Bahodir Pardaev | (Uzbekistan) | FW | 26 April 1987 (aged 24) | Youth Team | 2008 | | 15+ | 3+ |
| | Jasur Hasanov | (Uzbekistan) | MF | 2 August 1983 (aged 28) | Mash'al Mubarek | 2007 | | 124+ | 11+ |
Players who left during the season
| 7 | Azizbek Haydarov | (Uzbekistan) | MF | 8 July 1985 (aged 26) | Lokomotiv Tashkent | 2007 | | 139+ | 6+ |
| 11 | Ivan Nagaev | (Uzbekistan) | FW | 3 July 1989 (aged 22) | Navbahor Namangan | 2010 | | 0 | 0 |
| 23 | Sakhob Juraev | (Uzbekistan) | DF | 19 January 1987 (aged 24) | Lokomotiv Tashkent | 2007 | | 115+ | 2+ |
| 30 | Karim Izrailov | (Kyrgyzstan) | MF | 14 March 1987 (aged 24) | Andijon | 2011 | | 0 | 0 |

=== Out on loan ===
Note: Flags indicate national team as defined under FIFA eligibility rules; some limited exceptions apply. Players may hold more than one non-FIFA nationality.

| No. | Pos. | Nation | Player |
|---|---|---|---|
| 26 | MF | UZB | Anvar Rakhimov (at Olmaliq) |
| 29 | FW | UZB | Bahodir Pardaev (at Sogdiana Jizzakh) |

| No. | Pos. | Nation | Player |
|---|---|---|---|
| — | MF | UZB | Jasur Hasanov (at Qatar SC) |

=== Technical Staff ===
| Position | Name |
|---|---|
| Manager | (Uzbekistan) Mirjalol Kasymov |
| Assistant coach | (Uzbekistan) Hikmat Irgashev |
| Assistant coach | (Ukraine) Amet Memet |
| Fitness coach | (Uzbekistan) Alexander Volkov |
| Goalkeeping coach | (Uzbekistan) Abdusattar Rakhimov |

== Transfers ==
=== In ===
| Date | Position | Nationality | Name | From | Fee | Ref. |
|---|---|---|---|---|---|---|
| Winter 2011 | DF | (Uzbekistan) | Akmal Shorakhmedov | Andijon | Undisclosed | |
| Winter 2011 | DF | (Serbia) | Saša Đorđević | Shakhter Karagandy | Undisclosed | |
| Winter 2011 | DF | (Serbia) | Slavoljub Đorđević | Red Star Belgrade | Undisclosed | |
| Winter 2011 | DF | (Uzbekistan) | Islom Inomov | Liaoning Whowin | Undisclosed | |
| Winter 2011 | MF | (Uzbekistan) | Jovlon Ibrokhimov | Lokomotiv Tashkent | Undisclosed | |
| Winter 2011 | MF | (Uzbekistan) | Karim Izrailov | Andijon | Undisclosed | |
| Winter 2011 | MF | (Uzbekistan) | Asqar Jadigerov | Nanchang Hengyuan | Undisclosed | |
| Winter 2011 | MF | (Uzbekistan) | Umid Tajimov | Metallurg Bekabad | Undisclosed | |
| Winter 2011 | FW | (Uzbekistan) | Kamoliddin Murzoev | Nasaf Qarshi | Undisclosed | |
| Winter 2011 | FW | (Uzbekistan) | Ivan Nagaev | Navbahor Namangan | Undisclosed | |
| Summer 2011 | MF | (Serbia) | Uroš Milosavljević | Shurtan Guzar | Undisclosed | |

=== Loans in ===
| Start date | Position | Nationality | Name | To | End date | Ref. |
|---|---|---|---|---|---|---|
| Winter 2011 | FW | (Serbia) | Miloš Trifunović | Red Star Belgrade | Winter 2010 | |

=== Out ===
| Date | Position | Nationality | Name | To | Fee | Ref. |
|---|---|---|---|---|---|---|
| Winter 2011 | DF | (Uzbekistan) | Alexandr Khvostunov | Qizilqum Zarafshon | Undisclosed | |
| Winter 2011 | MF | (Uzbekistan) | Timur Kapadze | Incheon United | Undisclosed | |
| Winter 2011 | MF | (Uzbekistan) | Anzur Ismailov | Changchun Yatai | Undisclosed | |
| Winter 2011 | DF | (Uzbekistan) | Sakhob Juraev | Sogdiana Jizzakh | Undisclosed | |
| Winter 2011 | MF | (Uzbekistan) | Server Djeparov | Incheon United | Undisclosed | |
| Winter 2011 | DF | (Uzbekistan) | Alexander Kovalyov | Yenisey Krasnoyarsk | Undisclosed | |
| Winter 2011 | DF | (Uzbekistan) | Shavkat Raimqulov | Andijon | Undisclosed | |
| Summer 2011 | DF | (Uzbekistan) | Sakhob Juraev | Sogdiana Jizzakh | Undisclosed | |
| Summer 2011 | MF | (Uzbekistan) | Azizbek Haydarov | Al Shabab | Undisclosed | |

=== Loans out ===
| Start date | Position | Nationality | Name | To | End date | Ref. |
|---|---|---|---|---|---|---|
| Summer 2011 | MF | (Uzbekistan) | Jasur Hasanov | Qatar | Winter 2011 | |
| Summer 2011 | MF | (Uzbekistan) | Karim Izrailov | Dinamo Samarqand | Winter 2011 | |
| Summer 2011 | MF | (Uzbekistan) | Anvar Rakhimov | Olmaliq | Winter 2011 | |
| Summer 2011 | FW | (Uzbekistan) | Ivan Nagaev | Metallurg Bekabad | Winter 2011 | |
| Summer 2011 | FW | (Uzbekistan) | Bahodir Pardaev | Sogdiana Jizzakh | Winter 2011 | |

== Friendlies ==
=== Preseason ===
During the winter break Bunyodkor went to a training camp in Turkey where club played 5 friendly matches.

| 7 February 2011 | Bunyodkor (Uzbekistan) | 3 – 3 | (Ukraine) Obolon Kyiv | Antalya, Turkey |
| | Karpenko; Raimqulov |

| 10 February 2011 | Bunyodkor (Uzbekistan) | 0 – 0 | (Romania) Gloria Buzău | Antalya, Turkey |

| 13 February 2011 | Bunyodkor (Uzbekistan) | 0 – 3 | (Russia) Dynamo Bryansk | Antalya, Turkey |

| 16 February 2011 | Bunyodkor (Uzbekistan) | 0 – 1 | (Russia) Krylia Sovetov Samara | Antalya, Turkey |

| 19 February 2011 | Bunyodkor (Uzbekistan) | 0 – 0 | (Belarus) Naftan Novopolotsk | Antalya, Turkey |

=== Mid-season ===
Training match during FIFA official match days

| 26 March 2011 | Bunyodkor (Uzbekistan) | 2 – 0 | (Uzbekistan) Olmaliq FK | Tashkent |
| | Rajabov 4'; Shukhratov 77' | | | Stadium: JAR training field |

| 3 September 2011 | Bunyodkor (Uzbekistan) | 3 – 3 | (Uzbekistan) Olmaliq FK | Tashkent |
| | Trifunović 6', 51'; Milosavljević 88' (pen.) |

| 6 October 2011 | Bunyodkor (Uzbekistan) | 0 – 1 | Uzbekistan | Tashkent |
| | | | Bakaev 85' |

| 9 October 2011 | Bunyodkor (Uzbekistan) | 3 – 0 | (Uzbekistan) Samarqand-Dinamo | Tashkent |
| | Trifunović 6'; Milosavljević; Ibragimov |

== Competitions ==
=== Uzbek League ===
==== League table ====
| Pos | Team | Pld | W | D | L | GF | GA | GD | Pts | Qualification or relegation |
|---|---|---|---|---|---|---|---|---|---|---|
| 1 | Bunyodkor | 26 | 19 | 4 | 3 | 51 | 14 | +37 | 61 | 2012 AFC Champions League Group stage |
| 2 | Nasaf Qarshi | 26 | 15 | 8 | 3 | 43 | 15 | +28 | 53 | 2012 AFC Champions League Group stage |
| 3 | Pakhtakor Tashkent | 26 | 15 | 6 | 5 | 33 | 17 | +16 | 51 | 2012 AFC Champions League Group stage |
| 4 | Neftchi Farg'ona | 26 | 13 | 5 | 8 | 36 | 27 | +9 | 44 | 2012 AFC Champions League Qualifying play-off (Note: Since Pakhtakor also won the 2011 Uzbekistan Cup, the fourth-placed team of the league also qualified for the 2012 AFC Champions League.) |
| 5 | Mash'al Mubarek | 26 | 12 | 4 | 10 | 32 | 33 | −1 | 40 | |

Updated to match(es) played on 9 November 2011. Source: Uzbekistan Professional Football League
Rules for classification: 1) points; 2) goal difference; 3) number of goals scored.

==== Results ====
| 7 March 2011 1 | Mash'al Mubarek | 0 – 2 | Bunyodkor | Muborak |
| 16:00 UTC+5 | | Report | Haydarov (yellow card) 20'; Jadigerov 39'; Soliev 74' | Stadium: Bahrom Vafoev Stadium; Attendance: 10,015; Referee: Rustam Saidov |

| 12 March 2011 2 | Bunyodkor | 1 – 0 | Navbahor Namangan | Tashkent |
| 17:00 UTC+5 | M.Trifunović 2'; S.Juraev (yellow card) 42'; Jadigerov (yellow card) 58' | Report | Toirov (yellow card) 33' | Stadium: JAR Stadium; Attendance: 7,244; Referee: Igor Khudoydotov |

| 20 March 2011 3 | Bunyodkor | 3 – 1 | Metallurg Bekabad | Tashkent |
| 17:00 UTC+5 | Trifunović (yellow card) 36'; Soliev 64'; Salomov 68'; Murzoev 72' | Report | Nagaev 28' | Stadium: JAR Stadium; Attendance: 1,112; Referee: Rustam Bobomuradov |

| 1 April 2011 4 | Neftchi Fergana | 0 – 0 | Bunyodkor | Ferghana |
| 17:00 UTC+5 | M.Saidov (yellow card) 53'; A.Mukhiddinov (yellow card) 72'; M.Nizometdinov (yellow card) 90' | Report | Karimov (yellow card) 11'; Trifunović (yellow card) 33'; Sa.Đorđević (yellow card) 88' | Stadium: Fargona Stadium; Attendance: 16,253; Referee: Vadim Agishev |

| 9 April 2011 5 | Bunyodkor | 2 – 0 | Shurtan Guzar | Tashkent |
| 17:00 UTC+5 | Karimov (yellow card) 14'; Ibragimov 16'; Juraev 43'; Rakhimov (yellow card) 89' | Report | (yellow card) 11' Miloslavlevic; (yellow card) 51' Krushelnitskiy | Stadium: JAR Stadium; Attendance: 5,435; Referee: Sultan Zaylobiddinov |

| 15 April 2011 6 | Dinamo Samarqand | 0 – 1 | Bunyodkor | Samarkand |
| 16:30 UTC+5 | Oniya (yellow card) 76' | Report | Rajabov 22' | Stadium: Dinamo Stadium; Attendance: 10,170; Referee: Artyom Arutyunov |

| 25 April 2011 7 | Bunyodkor | 3 – 1 | Andijon | Tashkent |
| 18:00 UTC+5 | Rajabov 19'; Trifunović 38', 52'; Karimov (yellow card) 54' | Report | D.Đurđević (yellow card) 54'; L.Soliev 83' (pen.) | Stadium: JAR Stadium; Attendance: 4,716; Referee: Bakhtiyor Namazov |

| 15 May 2011 8 | Qizilqum Zarafshon | 1 – 4 | Bunyodkor | Zarafshan |
| 18:00 UTC+5 | Koshelev 46' (pen.); E.Odibe (yellow card) 71' | Report | Soliev 35'; Sl.Đorđević (yellow card) 46'; Soliev (yellow card) 60'; Trifunović 68', 78'; Karimov (yellow card) 90+2'; Murzoev 90+3' | Stadium: Progress Stadium; Attendance: 4,521; Referee: Rustam Saidov |

| 19 May 2011 9 | Bunyodkor | 4 – 1 | Olmaliq | Tashkent |
| 18:00 UTC+5 | Soliev 12'; Inomov (yellow card) 16'; Ghofurov 43'; Trifunović 47', 58'; Haydarov (yellow card) 75'; Jadigerov (yellow card) 78' | Report | M.Mamazulunov (yellow card) 54' (yellow-red card) 75' (goal) 66'; Hojiakbarov (yellow card) 85' | Stadium: JAR Stadium; Attendance: 3,110; Referee: Igor Hudaydatov |

| 11 June 2011 11 | Bunyodkor | 2 – 1 | Nasaf Qarshi | Tashkent |
| 19:30 UTC+5 | Soliev (yellow card) 20'; Trifunović 72', 82' | Report | Perepļotkins 70' | Stadium: JAR Stadium; Attendance: 8,305; Referee: Ravshan Irmatov |

| 15 June 2011 12 | Sogdiana Jizzakh | 1 – 6 | Bunyodkor | Jizzakh |
| 18:00 UTC+5 | Fomenka 53' | Report | Karpenko 9', 71'; Trifunović 55', 75'; Haydarov 64'; Jadigerov (yellow card) 81'; Rajabov 84' | Stadium: Sogdiana Stadium; Attendance: 8,952; Referee: Valentin Kovalenko |

| 20 June 2011 13 | Bunyodkor | 3 – 0 | FK Buxoro | Tashkent |
| 20:00 UTC+5 | Karpenko 7'; Soliev 41'; Trifunović 78' | Report | | Stadium: JAR Stadium; Attendance: 5,180; Referee: Olim Tolibjonov |

| 7 July 2011^{1} 10 | Pakhtakor Tashkent | 0 – 0 | Bunyodkor | Tashkent |
| 20:00 UTC+5 | | Report | | Stadium: Pakhtakor Markaziy Stadium; Attendance: 8,503; Referee: Ravshan Irmatov |
Note: Match originally scheduled for 29 May 2011, but rearranged due Uzbekistans preparation for a friendly against Ukraine on 1 June 2011.

| 30 July 2011 14 | FK Buxoro | 0 – 4 | Bunyodkor | Bukhara |
| 18:00 UTC+5 | A.Nikitenko (yellow card) 71' | Report | Soliev 2'; Jadigerov (yellow card) 23'; Karpenko 28'; Shorakhmedov (yellow card) 33' (goal) 34'; Salomov (yellow card) 52'; Hasanov 90+1' | Stadium: Buxoro Arena; Attendance: 7,725; Referee: Ravshan Irmatov |

| 6 August 2011 15 | Bunyodkor | 1 – 0 | Sogdiana Jizzakh | Tashkent |
| 20:00 UTC+5 | Trifunović 24' | Report | | Stadium: JAR Stadium; Attendance: 3,060; Referee: Rustam Bobomurodov |

| 13 August 2011 16 | Nasaf Qarshi | 0 – 0 | Bunyodkor | Qarshi |
| 20:00 UTC+5 | Mališić (yellow card) 90' | Report | Sl.Đorđević (yellow card) 38'; Trifunović (penalty missed) 90'; Melziddinov (yellow card) 90+3' | Stadium: Qarshi Stadium; Attendance: 13,349; Referee: Ravshan Irmatov |

| 21 August 2011 17 | Bunyodkor | 2 – 1 | Pakhtakor Tashkent | Tashkent |
| 20:00 UTC+5 | Gafurov (yellow card) 52'; Ibrokhimov (yellow card) 69'; Karpenko 70'; Trifunović 72'; Jadigerov (yellow card) 90' | Report | Tadjiyev (yellow card) 49'; Suyunov (yellow card) 75'; Azizov 88' | Stadium: JAR Stadium; Attendance: 8,469; Referee: Ravshan Irmatov |

| 9 September 2011 19 | Bunyodkor | 3 – 1 | Qizilqum Zarafshon | Tashkent |
| 20:00 UTC+5 | Rajabov 24'; Karpenko 39'; Salomov 55' | Report | S.Nasibullayev (yellow card) 19'; O.Juraboev 51' | Stadium: JAR Stadium; Attendance: 2,148; Referee: Murod Mukhammedov |

| 17 September 2011 20 | FK Andijan | 1 – 1 | Bunyodkor | Andijon |
| 17:00 UTC+5 | Polovkov (yellow card) 65'; Popovici 67'; I.Ibragimov (yellow card) 78' | Report | Soliev 42' | Stadium: Soghlom Avlod Stadium; Attendance: 10,132; Referee: Ravshan Irmatov |

| 24 September 2011 21 | Bunyodkor | 2 – 0 | Dinamo Samarqand | Tashkent |
| 18:00 UTC+5 | Ibragimov 69'; Trifunović 88' | Report | | Stadium: JAR Stadium; Attendance: 2,118; Referee: Olim Tolibjonov |

| 27 September 2011 18 | Olmaliq | 1 – 3 | Bunyodkor | Olmaliq |
| 20:00 UTC+5 | M.Mamazulunov 83' | Report | Sl.Đorđević (yellow card) 25'; Karpenko 26'; Soliev 38'; Shorakhmedov (yellow card) 51'; Trifunović 54' | Stadium: Metallurg Stadium; Attendance: 6,244; Referee: Sultan Zaylobiddinov |

| 1 October 2011 22 | Shurtan Guzar | 1 – 0 | Bunyodkor | G'uzor |
| 17:00 UTC+5 | A.Merzlyakov 17'; A.Juraev (yellow card) 68' | Report | Karimov (yellow card) 41' | Stadium: G'uzor Stadium; Attendance: 7,201; Referee: Rustam Saidov |

| 15 October 2011 23 | Bunyodkor | 1 – 0 | Neftchi Fergana | Tashkent |
| 17:00 UTC+5 | Murzoev 59' | Report | Mirzaev (yellow card) 50' | Stadium: JAR Stadium; Attendance: 3,184; Referee: Vladislav Zeytlin |

| 23 October 2011 24 | Metallurg Bekabad | 2 – 1 | Bunyodkor | Bekabad |
| 15:00 UTC+5 | Karimov 8'; O.Isabayev (yellow card) 18'; Kalević 61' | Report | Sa.Đorđević (yellow card) 18'; Mandzukas 29' | Stadium: Metallurg Bekabad Stadium; Attendance: Bakhtiyor Namozov; Referee: 5,007 |

| 1 November 2011 25 | Navbahor Namangan | 1 – 0 | Bunyodkor | Kosonsoy |
| 14:30 UTC+5 | Makhmudov 34'; R.Ahmedov (yellow card) 39'; S.Askaraliyev (yellow card) 45+1'; Toirov (yellow card) 71' | Report | Sl.Đorđević (yellow card) 30'; Karimov (yellow card) 37'; Salomov (yellow card) 45+1'; Murzoev (yellow card) 88'; Melziddinov (yellow card) 89' | Stadium: Markaziy Stadium; Attendance: 2,831; Referee: Sultan Zaylobidinov |

| 5 November 2011 26 | Bunyodkor | 2 – 0 | Mash'al Mubarek | Muborak |
| 14:30 UTC+5 | Rajabov 55'; Trifunović 57' | Report | | Stadium: Bahrom Vafoev Stadium; Attendance: 2,318; Referee: Rustam Bobomurodov |

=== Uzbek Cup ===
==== Results ====
| 29 April 2011 Round of 32 | Khiva | 1 – 3 | Bunyodkor | Khiva |
| 16:30 UTC+5 | Latipov (yellow card) 32'; Kuzibaev 45+1' | Report | Rakhimov (yellow card) 20'; Jadigerov 23'; Rakhimov 40'; Soliev 44' (pen.) | Stadium: Khiva Town Central Stadium; Attendance: 8,708; Referee: B.Togaev |

| 6 May 2011 Round of 16 1st Leg | Bunyodkor | 5 – 0 | Erkurgan | Tashkent |
| 18:00 UTC+5 | Shukhratov 2'; Soliev 20'; Mandzukas 44', 56'; Rakhimov 48' | Report | B.Murtazaev (yellow card) 41'; O.Palvanov (yellow card) 72' | Stadium: JAR Stadium; Attendance: 2,549; Referee: Vladislav Zeytlin |

| 6 June 2011 Round of 16 2nd Leg | Erkurgan | 1 – 1 (1 – 6 agg.) | Bunyodkor | Kasbi |
| 17:00 UTC+5 | B.Murtazoev 40' | Report | D.Khasanov 87' | Stadium: Kasbi Stadium; Attendance: 4,221; Referee: Murod Mahmudov |

| 28 June 2011 Quarter-final 1st Leg | Sogdiana Jizzakh | 1 – 3 | Bunyodkor | Jizzakh |
| 18:00 UTC+5 | S.Khamidov 47' | Report | Rakhimov 36'; Mandzukas 56', 58' | Stadium: Markaziy Stadium; Attendance: 1,512; Referee: Viktor Serazetdinov |

| 2 July 2011 Quarter-final | Bunyodkor | 2 – 0 (5 – 1 agg.) | Sogdiana Jizzakh | Tashkent |
| 20:00 UTC+5 | Ibragimov 30'; S.Juraev (yellow card) 53'; Trifunovic 58' | Report | Klikunov (yellow card) 55'; Niyozov (yellow card) 59' | Stadium: JAR Stadium; Attendance: 2,131; Referee: Vladislav Zeytlin |

| 2 August 2011 Semi-final 1st Leg | Bunyodkor | 1 – 0 | Nasaf Qarshi | Tashkent |
| 20:00 UTC+5 | Inomov (yellow card) 6'; Shorakhmedov (yellow card) 16'; Trifunovic 74' | Report | L.Turaev (yellow card) 41' | Stadium: JAR Stadium; Attendance: 6,278; Referee: Rustam Saidov |

| 17 August 2011 Semi-final 2nd Leg | Nasaf Qarshi | 1 – 0 (1 – 1 agg.) (4 – 3 p) | Bunyodkor | Qarshi |
| 20:00 UTC+5 | Bošković (yellow card) 72'; Gevorkyan 90+4' (pen.); J.Djiyamurodov (yellow card) 120' | Report | Rajabov (yellow card) 74' | Stadium: Markaziy Stadium; Attendance: 12,429; Referee: Valentin Kovalenko |
| | Penalties |
| | Bošković (penalty missed); Sh.Mirkholdirshoev (penalty scored); J.Djiyamurodov (penalty scored); I.Shomurodov (penalty scored); Gevorkyan (penalty scored) | | (penalty missed) Inomov; (penalty scored) Milosavljević; (penalty missed) Gafurov; (penalty scored) Sl.Đorđević; (penalty scored) Rajabov |

=== AFC Champions League ===
==== Group stage ====
| Pos | Team | Pld | W | D | L | GF | GA | GD | Pts | Qualification |
|---|---|---|---|---|---|---|---|---|---|---|
| 1 | (Saudi Arabia) Al-Ittihad Jeddah | 6 | 3 | 2 | 1 | 10 | 5 | +5 | 11 | Advance to knockout stage |
| 2 | (Uzbekistan) Bunyodkor | 6 | 2 | 3 | 1 | 8 | 6 | +2 | 9 | Advance to knockout stage |
| 3 | (United Arab Emirates) Al-Wahda | 6 | 1 | 3 | 2 | 6 | 8 | −2 | 6 | |
| 4 | (Iran) Persepolis | 6 | 1 | 2 | 3 | 6 | 11 | −5 | 5 | |

| 2 March 2011 1 | Al-Wahda (United Arab Emirates) | 1 – 1 | (Uzbekistan) Bunyodkor | Abu Dhabi, United Arab Emirates |
| 21:00 UTC+5 | Saeed (yellow card) 18'; Hugo 88'; F.Masoud (yellow card) 89' | Report | Haydarov (yellow card) 31' (goal) 85' | Stadium: Al-Nahyan Stadium; Attendance: 5,622; Referee: Ben Williams (Australia) |

| 16 March 2011 2 | Bunyodkor (Uzbekistan) | 0 – 1 | (Saudi Arabia) Al-Ittihad | Tashkent, Uzbekistan |
| 17:00 UTC+5 | Jadigerov (yellow card) 33'; Sa.Đorđević (yellow card) 58'; Soliev (yellow card) 84' | Report | Al-Muwallad 34'; Kariri (yellow card) 66' | Stadium: JAR Stadium; Attendance: 6,150; Referee: Maasaki Toma (Japan) |

| 5 April 2011 3 | Bunyodkor (Uzbekistan) | 0 – 0 | (Iran) Persepolis | Tashkent, Uzbekistan |
| 18:00 UTC+5 | Sl.Đorđević (yellow card) 6'; Karimov (yellow card) 82' | Report | Mohammad (yellow card) 53'; Aliasgari (yellow card) 90+2' | Stadium: JAR Stadium; Attendance: 7,000; Referee: Nawaf Shukralla (Bahrain) |

| 20 April 2011 4 | Persepolis (Iran) | 1 – 3 | (Uzbekistan) Bunyodkor | Tehran, Iran |
| 19:00 UTC+5 | Mohammad (red card) 70'; Zarei (yellow card) 82'; Arifi 87' | Report | Juraev (yellow card) 5'; Karimov (yellow card) 40' (goal) 72' (pen.); Rajabov 60'; Miloš Trifunović (yellow card) 68'; Karpenko 90+4' | Stadium: Azadi Stadium; Attendance: 31,765; Referee: Abdullah Balideh (Qatar) |

| 3 May 2011 5 | Bunyodkor (Uzbekistan) | 3 – 2 | (United Arab Emirates) Al-Wahda | Tashkent, Uzbekistan |
| 18:00 UTC+5 | Trifunović 11', 35'; Ibrokhimov (yellow card) 53'; Soliev 85' | Report | Matar 2'; Hugo 54' (pen.) | Stadium: JAR Stadium; Attendance: 7,600; Referee: Subkhiddin Mohd Salleh (Malaysia) |

| 10 May 2011 6 | Al-Ittihad (Saudi Arabia) | 1 – 1 | (Uzbekistan) Bunyodkor | Jeddah, Saudi Arabia |
| 23:10 UTC+5 | Assis 30' | Report | Trifunović 14'; Karimov (yellow card) 69' | Stadium: Prince Abdullah al-Faisal Stadium; Attendance: 7,882; Referee: Yuichi Nishimura (Japan) |

==== Knockout stage ====
| 24 May 2011 Last 16 | Sepahan (Iran) | 3 – 1 | (Uzbekistan) Bunyodkor | Isfahan, Iran |
| 20:00 UTC+5 | Januário 28'; Touré 33' (red card) 51'; Aghili 69' (pen.); Ebrahimi (yellow card) 83' | Report | Haydarov (yellow card) 50'; Soliev (yellow card) 51'; Sl.Đorđević 57' (yellow card) 68'; Karimov (yellow card) 73' | Stadium: Foolad Shahr Stadium; Attendance: 6,318; Referee: Maasaki Toma (Japan) |

== Squad statistics ==
As of match played 5 November 2011

=== Appearances and goals ===
| No. | Pos | Nat | Player | Total | | Uzbek League | | Uzbek Cup | | AFC Champions League | |
| No. | Pos | Nat | Player | Apps | Goals | Apps | Goals | Apps | Goals | Apps | Goals |
|---|---|---|---|---|---|---|---|---|---|---|---|
| 1 | GK | (Uzbekistan) UZB | Ignatiy Nesterov | 35 | 0 | 25 | 0 | 3 | 0 | 7 | 0 |
| 2 | DF | (Uzbekistan) UZB | Akmal Shorakhmedov | 27 | 1 | 12+8 | 1 | 6 | 0 | 1 | 0 |
| 3 | DF | (Serbia) SRB | Saša Đorđević | 15 | 1 | 7+1 | 0 | 3+1 | 0 | 1+2 | 1 |
| 4 | DF | (Uzbekistan) UZB | Hayrulla Karimov | 27 | 1 | 19+1 | 0 | 1 | 0 | 6 | 1 |
| 5 | DF | (Uzbekistan) UZB | Islom Inomov | 23 | 0 | 13+2 | 0 | 5+1 | 0 | 1+1 | 0 |
| 6 | MF | (Uzbekistan) UZB | Anvar Gafurov | 35 | 1 | 21+2 | 1 | 6 | 0 | 6 | 0 |
| 8 | MF | (Uzbekistan) UZB | Jovlon Ibrokhimov | 30 | 3 | 17+4 | 2 | 4 | 1 | 5 | 0 |
| 9 | FW | (Uzbekistan) UZB | Anvar Rajabov | 29 | 6 | 11+9 | 5 | 2+1 | 0 | 4+2 | 1 |
| 10 | MF | (Uzbekistan) UZB | Shavkat Salomov | 33 | 2 | 18+5 | 2 | 4+1 | 0 | 2+3 | 0 |
| 14 | FW | (Serbia) SRB | Miloš Trifunović | 36 | 22 | 23+2 | 17 | 4 | 2 | 6+1 | 3 |
| 15 | FW | (Uzbekistan) UZB | Miraziz Jalalov | 1 | 0 | 0 | 0 | 0+1 | 0 | 0 | 0 |
| 16 | MF | (Uzbekistan) UZB | Doniyor Khasanov | 8 | 2 | 2+2 | 1 | 0+4 | 1 | 0 | 0 |
| 17 | FW | (Uzbekistan) UZB | Kamoliddin Murzoev | 25 | 3 | 10+6 | 3 | 1+1 | 0 | 5+2 | 0 |
| 18 | DF | (Serbia) SRB | Slavoljub Đorđević | 33 | 0 | 21 | 0 | 5 | 0 | 7 | 0 |
| 19 | MF | (Uzbekistan) UZB | Yannis Mandzukas | 15 | 5 | 2+5 | 1 | 4+1 | 4 | 0+3 | 0 |
| 20 | FW | (Uzbekistan) UZB | Anvarjon Soliev | 35 | 11 | 14+9 | 8 | 6 | 2 | 2+4 | 1 |
| 22 | MF | (Uzbekistan) UZB | Victor Karpenko | 34 | 8 | 23+1 | 7 | 3 | 0 | 7 | 1 |
| 25 | GK | (Uzbekistan) UZB | Mukhiddin Khudoyorov | 1 | 0 | 1 | 0 | 0 | 0 | 0 | 0 |
| 28 | MF | (Uzbekistan) UZB | Ruslan Melziddinov | 9 | 0 | 3+6 | 0 | 0 | 0 | 0 | 0 |
| 44 | FW | (Uzbekistan) UZB | Rasul Shukhratov | 4 | 1 | 1 | 0 | 1+2 | 1 | 0 | 0 |
| 45 | GK | (Uzbekistan) UZB | Akbar Turaev | 4 | 0 | 0 | 0 | 4 | 0 | 0 | 0 |
| 47 | MF | (Uzbekistan) UZB | Asqar Jadigerov | 32 | 2 | 13+7 | 1 | 6+1 | 1 | 4+1 | 0 |
| | DF | (Uzbekistan) UZB | Dilshod Juraev | 5 | 0 | 1+1 | 0 | 0+3 | 0 | 0 | 0 |
| | MF | (Serbia) SRB | Uroš Milosavljević | 8 | 0 | 6+1 | 0 | 0+1 | 0 | 0 | 0 |
| | MF | (Uzbekistan) UZB | Furqat Khasanboev | 1 | 0 | 0 | 0 | 0+1 | 0 | 0 | 0 |
Players away from Bunyodkor on loan:
| 26 | MF | (Uzbekistan) UZB | Anvar Rakhimov | 10 | 3 | 1+4 | 0 | 4+1 | 3 | 0 | 0 |
| | MF | (Uzbekistan) UZB | Jasur Hasanov | 2 | 0 | 0 | 0 | 2 | 0 | 0 | 0 |
Players who left Bunyodkor during the season:
| 7 | MF | (Uzbekistan) UZB | Azizbek Haydarov | 19 | 1 | 11 | 0 | 1 | 0 | 7 | 1 |
| 23 | DF | (Uzbekistan) UZB | Sakhob Juraev | 20 | 1 | 10+2 | 1 | 2 | 0 | 6 | 0 |

=== Goal scorers ===
| Place | Position | Nation | Number | Name | Uzbek League | Uzbekistan Cup | AFC Champions League | Total |
|---|---|---|---|---|---|---|---|---|
| 1 | FW | (Serbia) | 14 | Miloš Trifunović | 17 | 2 | 3 | 22 |
| 2 | FW | (Uzbekistan) | 20 | Anvarjon Soliev | 8 | 2 | 1 | 11 |
| 3 | MF | (Uzbekistan) | 22 | Victor Karpenko | 7 | 0 | 1 | 8 |
| 4 | FW | (Uzbekistan) | 9 | Anvar Rajabov | 5 | 0 | 1 | 6 |
| 5 | MF | (Uzbekistan) | 19 | Yannis Mandzukas | 1 | 4 | 0 | 5 |
| 6 | FW | (Uzbekistan) | 17 | Kamoliddin Murzoev | 3 | 0 | 0 | 3 |
| 6 | MF | (Uzbekistan) | 8 | Jovlon Ibrokhimov | 2 | 1 | 0 | 3 |
| 6 | MF | (Uzbekistan) | 26 | Anvar Rakhimov | 0 | 3 | 0 | 3 |
| 9 | MF | (Uzbekistan) | 10 | Shavkat Salomov | 2 | 0 | 0 | 2 |
| 9 | MF | (Uzbekistan) | 47 | Asqar Jadigerov | 1 | 1 | 0 | 2 |
| 9 | MF | (Uzbekistan) | 16 | Doniyor Khasanov | 1 | 1 | 0 | 2 |
| 9 | MF | (Uzbekistan) | 7 | Azizbek Haydarov | 1 | 0 | 1 | 2 |
| 13 | MF | (Uzbekistan) | 6 | Anvar Ghofurov | 1 | 0 | 0 | 1 |
| 13 | DF | (Uzbekistan) | 23 | Sakhob Juraev | 1 | 0 | 0 | 1 |
| 13 | DF | (Uzbekistan) | 2 | Akmal Shorakhmedov | 1 | 0 | 0 | 1 |
| 13 | FW | (Uzbekistan) | 44 | Rasul Shukhratov | 0 | 1 | 0 | 1 |
| 13 | DF | (Serbia) | 3 | Slavoljub Đorđević | 0 | 0 | 1 | 1 |
| 13 | DF | (Uzbekistan) | 4 | Hayrulla Karimov | 0 | 0 | 1 | 1 |
| | | | | TOTALS | 51 | 15 | 9 | 75 |

=== Disciplinary record ===
| Number | Nation | Position | Name | Uzbek League | | Uzbekistan Cup | | AFC Champions League | | Total | |
| Number | Nation | Position | Name | Booked | Sent off (straight red) | Booked | Sent off (straight red) | Booked | Sent off (straight red) | Booked | Sent off (straight red) |
| 2 | (Uzbekistan) | DF | Akmal Shorakhmedov | 2 | 0 | 1 | 0 | 0 | 0 | 3 | 0 |
| 3 | (Serbia) | FW | Saša Đorđević | 2 | 0 | 0 | 0 | 1 | 0 | 3 | 0 |
| 4 | (Uzbekistan) | MF | Hayrulla Karimov | 6 | 0 | 0 | 0 | 4 | 0 | 10 | 0 |
| 5 | (Uzbekistan) | DF | Islom Inomov | 1 | 0 | 1 | 0 | 0 | 0 | 2 | 0 |
| 6 | (Uzbekistan) | MF | Anvar Gafurov | 1 | 0 | 0 | 0 | 0 | 0 | 1 | 0 |
| 8 | (Uzbekistan) | MF | Jovlon Ibrokhimov | 1 | 0 | 0 | 0 | 1 | 0 | 2 | 0 |
| 9 | (Uzbekistan) | FW | Anvar Rajabov | 0 | 0 | 1 | 0 | 0 | 0 | 1 | 0 |
| 10 | (Uzbekistan) | MF | Shavkat Salomov | 2 | 0 | 0 | 0 | 0 | 0 | 2 | 0 |
| 14 | (Serbia) | FW | Miloš Trifunović | 3 | 0 | 0 | 0 | 1 | 0 | 4 | 0 |
| 17 | (Uzbekistan) | FW | Kamoliddin Murzoev | 1 | 0 | 0 | 0 | 0 | 0 | 1 | 0 |
| 18 | (Serbia) | DF | Slavoljub Đorđević | 4 | 0 | 0 | 0 | 2 | 0 | 6 | 0 |
| 20 | (Uzbekistan) | FW | Anvarjon Soliev | 2 | 0 | 0 | 0 | 2 | 0 | 4 | 0 |
| 28 | (Uzbekistan) | MF | Ruslan Melziddinov | 2 | 0 | 0 | 0 | 0 | 0 | 2 | 0 |
| 47 | (Uzbekistan) | MF | Asqar Jadigerov | 4 | 0 | 0 | 0 | 1 | 0 | 5 | 0 |
Players away on loan:
| 26 | (Uzbekistan) | MF | Anvar Rakhimov | 1 | 0 | 1 | 0 | 0 | 0 | 2 | 0 |
Players who left Bunyodkor during the season:
| 7 | (Uzbekistan) | MF | Azizbek Haydarov | 2 | 0 | 0 | 0 | 2 | 0 | 4 | 0 |
| 23 | (Uzbekistan) | DF | Sakhob Juraev | 1 | 0 | 1 | 0 | 1 | 0 | 3 | 0 |
| | | | TOTALS | 35 | 0 | 5 | 0 | 15 | 0 | 55 | 0 |
