= Guryanov =

Guryanov or Gurianov (Russian: Гурьянов) is a Russian masculine surname, its feminine counterpart is Guryanova or Gurianova. It may refer to

- Denis Gurianov (born 1997), Russian ice hockey winger
- Nikolay Guryanov (1909–2002), Russian Orthodox Christian priest
- Georgy Guryanov (1961-2013), Soviet and Russian musician and artist
