= Vlasichev =

Vlasichev is a surname. Notable people with the surname include:

- Anatoliy Vlasichev (born 1988), Kyrgyzstani footballer
- Andrei Vlasichev (born 1981), Uzbekistani footballer
