= Mykola Pavlenko =

Ukrainian footballer

Personal information
- Full name: Mykola Pavlenko
- Date of birth: 7 May 1979 (age 47)
- Place of birth: Lozova, Soviet Union (now Ukraine)
- Height: 1.95 m (6 ft 5 in)
- Position: Goalkeeper

Senior career*
Years	Team	Apps	(Gls)
1997	Zirka-2 Kirovohrad	1	(0)
1999	Yavir Sumy	7	(0)
2000	Spartak-d Moscow	2	(0)
2002	SKA Rostov-on-Don	1	(0)
2003–2004	Yavir Krasnopillia	22	(0)
2004–2005	Arsenal Kyiv	1	(0)
2005–2006	Borysfen Boryspil	7	(0)
2006	Krymteplytsia Molodizhne	5	(0)
2007	Kharkiv	0	(0)
2008	RoPS	5	(0)
2008	Komunalnyk Luhansk	5	(0)
2009	Nasaf Qarshi	12	(0)
2010	Navbahor Namangan	9	(0)
2010	Volyn Lutsk	0	(0)
2011	Shakhtar Sverdlovsk	6	(0)
2011–2013	Sumy	31	(0)
- * Club domestic league appearances and goals

Mykola Pavlenko (born 7 May 1979) is a Ukrainian football player.

Pavlenko made one appearance in the Russian First Division for SKA Rostov-on-Don.

Pavlenko played for Finland's Premier division team RoPS, but he was released during the season on suspicion of playing in an arranged match.
