= Yuriy Tselykh =

Ukrainian footballer

Personal information
- Full name: Yuriy Mykolayovych Tselykh
- Date of birth: 18 April 1979 (age 47)
- Place of birth: Metalist, Luhansk Oblast, Ukrainian SSR
- Height: 1.83 m (6 ft 0 in)
- Position: Forward

Senior career*
Years	Team	Apps	(Gls)
1996–1999	Zorya Luhansk	86	(18)
1999–2005	Dynamo Kyiv	1	(0)
1999–2000	→ Dynamo-2 Kyiv	25	(3)
1999–2000	→ Dynamo-3 Kyiv	13	(0)
2000	→ Vorskla Poltava (loan)	3	(0)
2000	→ Vorskla-2 Poltava (loan)	7	(0)
2001	→ Dynamo-3 Kyiv	2	(1)
2001–2002	→ Zakarpattia Uzhhorod (loan)	11	(0)
2002	→ Zakarpattia-2 Uzhhorod (loan)	2	(0)
2002	→ CSKA Kyiv (loan)	13	(7)
2003	→ Obolon Kyiv (loan)	4	(0)
2003	→ Obolon-2 Kyiv (loan)	4	(1)
2003	→ Metalurh Zaporizhya (loan)	14	(4)
2004	→ Vorskla Poltava (loan)	13	(4)
2004	→ Zakarpattia Uzhhorod (loan)	11	(6)
2005	→ Vorskla Poltava (loan)	4	(1)
2005	→ Metalist Kharkiv (loan)	9	(0)
2005–2007	Kharkiv	31	(5)
2007	→ Zakarpattia Uzhhorod (loan)	14	(4)
2007–2008	Zorya Luhansk	17	(1)
2008–2009	Vitebsk	24	(3)
2009	Oleksandria	11	(2)
2010	Navbahor Namangan	10	(6)
2010–2011	Hoverla Uzhhorod	23	(2)
2011	Andijan	9	(2)
2012	Mykolaiv	6	(0)
2012	Bukovyna Chernivtsi	6	(0)
2013	Shakhtar Sverdlovsk	5	(0)

International career
	Ukraine U21	3	(0)
- * Club domestic league appearances and goals

Yuriy Tselykh (Ukrainian: Юрій Миколайович Целих; born 18 April 1979) is a Ukrainian former professional footballer.
