= Aleksey Nikolaev (footballer, born 1979) =

Russian-Uzbekistan footballer (born 1979)

Personal information
- Date of birth: 5 September 1979 (age 47)
- Place of birth: Voronezh, Soviet Union
- Height: 1.84 m (6 ft 0 in)
- Position: Defender

Senior career*
Years	Team	Apps	(Gls)
2000–2002	Qizilqum Zarafshon	96	(14)
2003–2005	Pakhtakor	72	(3)
2006	Shinnik Yaroslavl	2	(0)
2006–2007	Aktobe	31	(3)
2008	Bunyodkor	25	(0)
2009	Shenzhen Shangqingyin	26	(0)
2010	FK Samarqand-Dinamo	24	(1)
2011	Qizilqum Zarafshon	24	(3)
2012	Pakhtakor	7	(0)
2012–2013	Bukhoro	31	(2)
2014	NBU Osiyo		
2015	Kokand 1912	26	(0)
2017	Dinamo Samarqand	17	(0)

International career
2002–2008	Uzbekistan	42	(0)
- * Club domestic league appearances and goals

Aleksey Vladimirovich Nikolaev (Russian: Алексей Владимирович Николаев; born 5 September 1979) is a Russian-Uzbekistan former footballer. He is an ethnic Russian.

== Career ==
He started his player career at Qizilqum Zarafshon in 2000. In 2003-2005 he played for Pakhtakor and became three times Uzbek League champion. From 2006 to 2007 he played for Aktobe and won Kazakhstan Premier League in 2007. In 2008, he played one season for uprising uzbek club Kuruvchi.

== International ==
He played for national team 42 matches in 2002–2008.

== Honours ==
Pakhtakor

- Uzbek League (3): 2003, 2004, 2005
- Uzbek Cup (3): 2003, 2004, 2005
- AFC Champions League semi-final: 2002–03, 2004

Aktobe

- Kazakhstan Premier League (1): 2007
- Kazakhstan Premier League runner-up (1): 2006

Bunyodkor

- Uzbek League (1): 2008
- Uzbek Cup (1): 2008
