= Nikolay Guryanov =

Russian Orthodox starets and priest (1909-2002)

Priest, Mystic
- Born: Nikolai Alekseievich Gurianov; 24 May 1909; Gdovsky Uyezd, Russia
- Died: 24 August 2002 (aged 92); Russia
- Venerated in: Folk Christianity, Russia

External image
- Nikolay Guryanov

Nikolai Alekseievich Guryanov (Gurianov, Russian: Николай Алексеевич Гурьянов; May 24, 1909 – August 24, 2002) was a Russian Orthodox Christian and reputed myrrh-bearing starets and priest. Numerous miracles and healings are ascribed to him.

== Biography ==
Nikolay Guryanov was born May 24, 1909, to the family of a private landowner and merchant in the locality (pogost) of Samolva, village Chudskiye Zahody, Gdov district, Saint Petersburg gubernia. From his childhood he helped at the altar of the local church. In 1926 he finished Gatchina Pedagogical College and in 1929 he failed to complete his pedagogical education at the Leningrad Institute, for having objected at a meeting against the closure of one of the nearby churches. In 1931, Guryanov was unjustly arrested, and sent to the prison "Kresty" (Crosses) in Leningrad, then to a concentration camp near Kiev in Ukraine and spent 7 years of imprisonment in Syktyvkar (Republic of Komi). Upon gaining his freedom, Nikolay worked as a teacher of mathematics in the schools of Tosnensky District since residence in Leningrad was denied him. Meanwhile he also served as a psalm reader at the church in Tosno.

During World War II he was not mobilised due to the weakness of his feet which had been caused by work at the concentration camps. When Gdov district was occupied by German troops, Nikolay together with other residents was exiled to the Baltic. There he became a student at Vilnius Theological Seminary in Lithuania which opened in 1942. After two semesters of seminary studies Guryanov was consecrated to the priesthood by the exarch metropolitan Sergius (Voskresenkiy) at Riga Orthodox Cathedral of Christ's Nativity in Latvia. Later, he served as priest at different parishes in the Baltic states. During 1949–1951 Nikolai studied part-time at the Leningrad Theological Seminary and in 1951 was admitted for the first year to the Academy but having completed one year of part-time studies he did not continue further.

In 1958 he was transferred to the Pskov bishopric as parish priest of Saint Nicholas' church on the island of Talabsk (Zalit) in Pskov (Chudskoye) lake where he spent the remaining 44 years of his life, 40 as a priest, retiring at a very old age and settling at a humble wooden house nearby afterwards.

Among many of those who were allowed to visit him in recent times were pop stars Andrey Makarevich and Valentina Tolkunova. From the middle of 1999 the starets did not meet anyone, which provoked pilgrims to such a point that complaints were written to the administration of the Russian president.

In his final year, before his death, Nikolay, despite his illness nevertheless found the strength to receive pilgrims, to strengthen them and instruct them in faith. The thoughts of the starets spoken during these earthly conversation became a sort of spiritual testament for many Russian Orthodox.

In June 2002, a group of Orthodox priests and laity visited Nikolai for his blessing. He was asked: "Will we see an Orthodox Tsar?" Nikolay having traced the sign of the cross, prayed and firmly said "A Tsar is coming!"

Guryanov died on the night of August 24, 2002, at the age of 92. He was buried on August 26 on the island of Talabsk.

== Reputed miracles ==
According to several Orthodox memoirs and regional accounts, Guryanov was reputed to have located missing persons and to have helped free people held by bandits. His reputation spread, reportedly after a sailor who had survived a maritime accident travelled to Zalit (Talabsk) Island and recognised in Guryanov the starets who had appeared to him during the disaster. The sailor is said to have originally come to the island to visit another respected elder and only afterwards realised that it was Guryanov who had appeared to him.

In September 1997, a group of 10 pilgrims visited Nikolay in his wooden hut. He came out to bless them and anoint them with holy oil. One of the woman asked, "Father Nikolai, who will be after Yeltsin?" He replied: "Afterwards there will be the military one... His power will be short. But his age is little as he is himself. There will be persecutions, upon the monks and the church. His power will be as it was during the communists..." The woman asked again: "And what will be after? After will there be an Orthodox Tsar? Will we live to see that?" "You, yes." After those words he blessed the woman.

== Poetic gifts ==
Guryanov was endowed with a special musical gift. Starets loved church singing, and composed many spiritual songs and hymns which he performed himself. Many of his songs such as "Appraisal to the Mother of God", "To the Guardian Angel", "Saviour, warm my soul", "Brotherly hymn" and others became truly national indicating in the prophetic songs the way to true repentance.

"I came to father being torn with doubts about my life, with an empty, insignificant question and he in answer sang all my life in song and in the end said a few guiding words. And everything became clear to me, I said farewells in tears and left in peace and consoled - now I knew how should I live and what to do." - such stories were often heard from pilgrims, for many of whom the meeting with the starets became the beginning of new life - life in Christ.

== Teaching ==
Once he was asked what he considered to be the most dangerous sin in the souls of people? Father Nikolai answered: "Unbelief! This is frightening." - Even with Christians? - "Yes, even, with Orthodox Christians".

The pilgrims then asked: "Batiushka (Russian for father), what would you say to all Orthodox Christians about salvation? " - "Listen here the believing man, he must... with abundance of love relate to everything that surrounds him. Understood? With abundance of love."

== Devotion to Tsar and his veneration of Nicholas II ==
Per some Russian sources, the room of father Guryanov was filled with photos and images of Nicholas II and first family. He kept albums, films, documentaries telling about the last Russian Tsar. Guryanov also honoured Grigori Rasputin.
