= Zafar Kholmurodov =

Uzbekistani footballer (born 1976)

Personal information
- Date of birth: 15 October 1976 (age 50)
- Place of birth: Shahrisabz, Uzbek SSR, Soviet Union
- Height: 1.79 m (5 ft 10 in)
- Position: Striker

Team information
- Current team: Nasaf Qarshi (assistant coach)

Senior career*
| Years | Team | Apps | (Gls) |
| 1996 | Hisor Shahrisabz | | |
| 1997–2006 | Nasaf Qarshi | 224 | (153) |
| 2006 | Mash'al Mubarek | 5 | (1) |
| 2006–2009 | Nasaf Qarshi | | |
| 2010 | Xorazm FK Urganch | 10 | (1) |
| 2010 | Nasaf Qarshi | 4 | (1) |
| 2011 | Mash'al Mubarek | 25 | (9) |
| 2012 | Olmaliq FK | | |

International career
| 2000–2007 | Uzbekistan | 9 | (0) |

Managerial career
- 2013–: Nasaf Qarshi (assistant)
- * Club domestic league appearances and goals

Zafar Kholmurodov (born 15 October 1976), is an Uzbek football coach and former player.

== Club career ==
=== Nasaf Qarshi ===
Zafar Kholmurodov played the most time of his career for Nasaf Qarshi, he joined club in 1996. He is the first Uzbek player to score 200 goals in the Uzbek League, in 377 matches (as of 22 May 2012).

=== Mashal Mubarek ===
In 2011, he moved to Mash'al Mubarek and scored 9 goals in the 2011 season. On 8 January 2012 he signed a one-year extension contract with club, but moved to Olmaliq FK on free transfer.

=== Olmaliq FK ===
On 25 May 2012, in Uzbek League match Olmaliq FK against Metallurg Bekabad, Kholmurodov scored his 200th goal in Uzbek League matches, winning the match with 3:2.

On 29 December 2012 IFFHS published a list of The World's most successful Top Division Goal Scorer among the still active Players. Kholmurodov ranked 19th in this list, scoring in all 200 goals in 379 matches in his career.

== International career ==
Kholmurodov made his debut in the national team on 18 May 2000 in a match against Thailand. He played 9 matches for the national team.

== Managerial career ==
After the 2012 season, Kholmurodov finished his playing career and started coaching at Nasaf Qarshi.

== Honours ==
- Uzbek League 3rd (5): 2000, 2001, 2005, 2006, 2010
- Uzbek Cup runner-up : 2003

Individual

- Uzbekistan Footballer of the Year 2nd: 2000
- Gennadi Krasnitsky club: 238 goals
