= Uroš Milosavljević =

Serbian footballer

Personal information
- Date of birth: 13 July 1982 (age 44)
- Place of birth: Pančevo, SFR Yugoslavia
- Height: 1.83 m (6 ft 0 in)
- Position: Midfielder

Senior career*
Years	Team	Apps	(Gls)
2000–2001	Dinamo Pančevo	17	(3)
2002	OFK Beograd	10	(0)
2002–2004	Metalurh Zaporizhzhia	27	(0)
2004	→ Volyn Lutsk (loan)	8	(0)
2004	→ Ikva Mlyniv (loan)	1	(0)
2005	Vojvodina	2	(0)
2006	CFR Timișoara	7	(0)
2006	UT Arad	10	(0)
2007	Zvezda Irkutsk	11	(2)
2007–2008	Gloria Buzău	0	(0)
2008–2009	CFR Timișoara	13	(1)
2009	Hajduk Kula	1	(0)
2010	Taraz	30	(2)
2011	Shurtan Guzar	13	(0)
2011	Bunyodkor	7	(0)
2012	Donji Srem	5	(0)
Total		162	(8)
- * Club domestic league appearances and goals as of 4 March 2019

Uroš Milosavljević (Serbian Cyrillic: Урош Милосављевић; born 13 July 1982) is a Serbian retired footballer.
