= Olim Navkarov =

Uzbekistani association football player

Personal information
- Full name: Olim Navkarov
- Date of birth: 3 March 1983 (age 43)
- Place of birth: Zarafshon, Uzbek SSR, Soviet Union
- Height: 1.77 m (5 ft 10 in)
- Position: Forward

Team information
- Current team: Olmaliq FK
- Number: 77

Senior career*
Years	Team	Apps	(Gls)
2010	Lokomotiv Tashkent	13	(2)
2010	Qizilqum Zarafshon	13	(4)
2011	FK Andijan	4	(1)
2012	Lokomotiv Tashkent	1	(0)
2012	FK Dinamo Samarqand	2	(0)
2013	Qizilqum Zarafshon	8	(2)
2013	Olmaliq FK	2	(1)

International career^{‡}
2010–2011	Uzbekistan	11	(2)
- * Club domestic league appearances and goals as of 9 November 2013 ‡ National team caps and goals as of 26 March 2011

Olim Navkarov (born 3 March 1983) is an Uzbekistani footballer who currently plays for Olmaliq FK. His position is forward, he can play second striker.

== Career ==
He had an offer from an Iranian side Foolad F.C., so he went to Iran for a trial at the club. He came back to Uzbekistan saying that he didn't like the conditions, and continued his career at Qizilqum Zarafshon.

== Career statistics ==
=== International goals ===
#	Date	Venue	Opponent	Score	Result	Competition
1	12 October 2010	Manama, Bahrain	Bahrain	1–0	4–2	Friendly
2	2 January 2011	Sharjah	Jordan	1–0	2–2	Friendly
