= Asror Aliqulov =

Uzbekistani footballer (born 1978)

Personal information
- Full name: Asror Chorievich Aliqulov
- Date of birth: 12 September 1978 (age 48)
- Place of birth: Muborak, Uzbek SSR, Soviet Union
- Height: 1.84 m (6 ft 1/2 in)
- Position: Defender

Team information
- Current team: Shurtan Guzar

Senior career*
Years	Team	Apps	(Gls)
1995–1996	Mash'al Mubarek	35	(0)
1997–2002	Nasaf Qarshi	160	(5)
2000	Pakhtakor	4	(0)
2003–2009	Pakhtakor	147	(1)
2010	Shurtan Guzar	21	(1)
2010	Nasaf Qarshi	5	(0)
2011–2013	Shurtan Guzar	58	(1)
2014	FK Dinamo Samarqand	21	(0)
2015–2016	Shurtan Guzar	19	(0)

International career^{‡}
1999–2008	Uzbekistan	61	(0)
- * Club domestic league appearances and goals as of 11 April 2012 ‡ National team caps and goals as of 11 September 2017

Asror Aliqulov (born 12 September 1978) is an Uzbekistani footballer playing in the position of defender. He currently plays for Shurtan.

== Career ==
He started his playing career in 1995, playing for Mash'al Mubarek. After completing 3 seasons for Mash'al he moved to Nasaf Qarshi. From 1997 to 2002 he played for Pakhtakor.

== International ==
He was a member of the national team, playing from 1999 to 2008 and has been capped 63 times.

== Honours ==
=== Club ===
Pakhtakor

- Uzbek League (5): 2003, 2004, 2005, 2006, 2007
- Uzbek Cup (5): 2003, 2004, 2005, 2006, 2007
- AFC Champions League semifinal (2): 2002/2003, 2004
- CIS Cup: 2007

=== National team ===
- Merdeka Tournament winner: 2001
