= Andrei Vlasichev =

Uzbekistani footballer

Personal information
- Full name: Andrei Vladimirovich Vlasichev
- Date of birth: 27 January 1981 (age 45)
- Place of birth: Uzbek SSR
- Height: 1.81 m (5 ft 11 in)
- Position: Midfielder

Team information
- Current team: Lokomotiv Tashkent

Senior career*
Years	Team	Apps	(Gls)
1999	Sogdiana Jizak	5	(0)
2000	FC Dustlik Tashkent	7	(1)
2001–2003	FC Pakhtakor Tashkent	43	(2)
2003	FC Baltika Kaliningrad	14	(2)
2004	FC Pakhtakor Tashkent	3	(1)
2004	Navbahor Namangan	13	(3)
2005–2006	FC Ordabasy	30	(1)
2006	Sogdiana Jizak	11	(2)
2011	Lokomotiv Tashkent	1	(0)

International career
2001–2003	Uzbekistan	11	(0)
- * Club domestic league appearances and goals

Andrei Vlasichev (born 27 January 1981) is an Uzbek professional football player who plays for Lokomotiv Tashkent, and before for FC Pakhtakor Tashkent in the Uzbek League, FC Baltika Kaliningrad in the Russian First Division and FC Ordabasy the Kazakhstan Premier League.

Vlasichev made 11 appearances for the Uzbekistan national football team.
