= Asqar Jadigerov =

Uzbekistani footballer

Personal information
- Full name: Asqar Jadigerov
- Date of birth: 5 January 1980 (age 46)
- Place of birth: Tashkent, Soviet Union
- Height: 1.77 m (5 ft 9 1/2 in)
- Position: Midfielder

Senior career*
Years	Team	Apps	(Gls)
2000–2003	FK Andijan		
2004	FC Yassi		
2005	FC Ordabasy		
2006–2009	FK Andijan		
2010	Pakhtakor Tashkent	9	(0)
2010	Nanchang Hengyuan	19	(2)
2011	Bunyodkor	20	(1)
2012	Buriram United	5	(1)
2012	FK Dinamo Samarqand	10	(0)
2013–2015	FK Andijon	16	(2)

International career
	Uzbekistan U20	26	(8)
- * Club domestic league appearances and goals as of 4 April 2015

Asqar Jadigerov (born 5 January 1980 in Uzbek SSR, Soviet Union) is an Uzbekistani professional footballer who plays as a midfielder.

== Club career ==
Asqar Jadigerov started his footballing career at FK Andijan and transferred to Kazakhstan Premier League side Yassi and Ordabasy for several seasons. He joined Pakhtakor Tashkent in 2010 where he took part in the 2010 AFC Champions League.

He moved to China and signed a contract with Nanchang Hengyuan in July 2010. He made his Chinese Super League debut against Liaoning Whowin on 14 July and scored his first goal for Nanchang on 8 August.

In February 2013 he signed a contract FK Andijan after playing the second half of 2012 season at FK Dinamo Samarqand.
