= Karim Izrailov =

Kyrgyzstani footballer

Personal information
- Full name: Karim Izrailov
- Date of birth: 14 March 1987 (age 39)
- Place of birth: Bishkek, Kirghiz SSR
- Height: 1.83 m (6 ft 0 in)
- Position: Midfielder

Team information
- Current team: Dordoi Bishkek

Senior career*
Years	Team	Apps	(Gls)
2005–2007	Cesna	37	(1)
2008	Lokomotiv Plovdiv	0	(0)
2009	TP-47	8	(0)
2010	Mash'al Mubarek	22	(2)
2010	Andijan	13	(3)
2011	Bunyodkor	0	(0)
2011	Dinamo Samarqand	3	(0)
2011	Karşıyaka	4	(0)
2012–2013	Abdish-Ata Kant		
2014–2016	Alay Osh		
2017–	Dordoi Bishkek		

International career^{‡}
2013–	Kyrgyzstan	3	(0)
- * Club domestic league appearances and goals as of 30 January 2017 ‡ National team caps and goals as of 26 August 2015

Karim Izrailov (born 14 March 1987) is a Kyrgyzstani professional footballer. Currently he is playing for Dordoi Bishkek.

== Career ==
Izrailov played for Mash'al Mubarek during the 2010 Uzbek League.

In January 2017, Izrailov went on trial with Dordoi Bishkek, signing a two-year contract with Dordoi Bishkek on 16 January 2017.

== Career statistics ==
=== International ===
Kyrgyzstan national team
Year	Apps	Goals
2007	3	0
Total	3	0

Statistics accurate as of match played 21 March 2013
