= Oleksandr Polovkov =

Ukrainian footballer (1979–2026)

Personal information
- Full name: Oleksandr Ivanovych Polovkov
- Date of birth: 4 October 1979
- Place of birth: Sverdlovsk, Ukrainian SSR, Soviet Union
- Date of death: April 2026 (aged 46)
- Height: 1.89 m (6 ft 2 in)
- Position: Defender

Youth career
- 1991–1997: Shakhtar Sverdlovsk

Senior career*
Years	Team	Apps	(Gls)
1997–1999	Shakhtar Sverdlovsk		
1999–2000	FC Ellada Luhansk		
2000	FC Dynamo Stakhanov	0	(0)
2000–2002	Stal-2 Alchevsk	35	(1)
2000–2007	Stal Alchevsk	136	(10)
2002–2003	→ FC Shakhtar Luhansk (loan)	24	(4)
2007–2009	Zorya Luhansk	23	(0)
2010	Navbahor Namangan	12	(0)
2010–2012	Andijan	37	(0)
2012–2013	Shakhtar Sverdlovsk	12	(2)
- * Club domestic league appearances and goals

Oleksandr Ivanovych Polovkov (Ukrainian: Олександр Іванович Половков; 4 October 1979 – April 2026) was a Ukrainian professional football defender who played for different clubs in the Ukrainian Premier League. He last played for Shakhtar Sverdlovsk prior to the suspension of club activities due to the annexation of Crimea by the Russian Federation.

On 8 August 2015, he played for LNR football team.

Following the war in Donbas, Polovkov lived in Dovzhansk, which was occupied by pro-Russian separatists. He was killed during the Russo-Ukrainian war in April 2026, following an incident blamed on the Armed Forces of Ukraine.
