= Kamoliddin Murzoev =

Uzbekistani footballer

Personal information
- Full name: Kamoliddin Murzoev
- Date of birth: 17 February 1987 (age 39)
- Place of birth: Bekabad, Uzbek SSR, Soviet Union
- Height: 1.82 m (5 ft 11 1/2 in)
- Position: Forward

Senior career*
Years	Team	Apps	(Gls)
2004–2006	Metallurg Bekabad	32	(20)
2006–2008	Mash'al Mubarek	45	(31)
2007	→Dynamo-2 Kyiv (loan)	9	(1)
2009	Nasaf Qarshi	17	(12)
2009	Bunyodkor	5	(4)
2010	Nasaf Qarshi	24	(5)
2011–2013	Bunyodkor	46	(8)
2013–2014	Irtysh Pavlodar	12	(4)
2014	Shakhter Karagandy	22	(0)
2015	AGMK	12	(3)
2015	Dinamo Samarqand	13	(8)
2016	Buxoro	12	(0)
2017–2018	AGMK	32	(3)

International career
2006–	Uzbekistan	2	(0)
- * Club domestic league appearances and goals as of 23:19, 13 May 2019 (UTC)

Kamoliddin Murzoev (born 17 February 1987) is an Uzbekistani professional footballer who plays as a forward.

== Career ==
He started his playing in Metallurg Bekabad in 2004. Murzoev played in Metallurg 3 seasons, after joying Dynamo Kyiv. He made 9 caps for Dynamo Kyiv, scoring one goal.

In 2011, he moved to Bunyodkor after one season played in Nasaf Qarshi. Murzoev had already played in Bunyodkor in 2009. In 2011–2013 he made 46 caps and scored 8 goals in League matches for Bunyodkor. On 23 June 2013 he signed a contract with 2012 Kazakhstan Premier League runner-up club Irtysh Pavlodar. Murzoev scored his first goal for the Kazakh side on 11 July 2013, in the 2:0 home win over Levski Sofia in a UEFA Europa League match. In February 2014, he joined Shakhter Karagandy, another leading Kazakh club. In February 2015, Murzoev returned to his home country, signing a contract with Uzbek League club Olmaliq.
