= Shavkat Raimqulov =

Uzbekistani footballer

Personal information
- Full name: Shavkat Abdusalomovich Raimqulov
- Date of birth: 7 May 1984 (age 42)
- Place of birth: Angren, Uzbek SSR
- Height: 1.84 m (6 ft 1/2 in)
- Position: Defender

Senior career*
Years	Team	Apps	(Gls)
2000–2001	Semurg Angren	23	(0)
2002	Zarafshon Navoi	9	(1)
2003–2004	Traktor Tashkent	47	(2)
2005–2006	Navbahor Namangan	50	(2)
2007	FK Andijan	29	(0)
2008–2009	Bunyodkor	4	(0)
2010	Shurtan Guzar	13	(0)
2011	FK Andijan (on loan)	22	(0)
2012	Nasaf Qarshi	15	(0)
2013	Shurtan Guzar	8	(0)
2013	Oqtepa		
2014	Bukhoro	13	(0)

International career^{‡}
2003	Uzbekistan U20	3	(0)
2008–2011	Uzbekistan	2	(0)
- * Club domestic league appearances and goals ‡ National team caps and goals as of 24 February 2011

Shavkat Raimqulov (Russian: Шавкат Раимкулов; born 7 May 1984) is an Uzbekistani professional footballer. He last played for Bukhoro. He plays as a defender.

== Career ==
Raimqulov has made appearances for the Uzbekistan national football team. He also appeared for Uzbekistan U-20 at the 2003 FIFA World Youth Championship in UAE.

== Honours ==
=== Club ===
Bunyodkor

- Uzbek League (2): 2008, 2009
- Uzbek Cup (1): 2008

Nasaf

- Uzbek Cup runners-up (1): 2012
