= 2011 AFC Cup final =

- Event: 2011 AFC Cup
Nasaf Qarshi	Al-Kuwait
(Uzbekistan)	(Kuwait)
2	1
- Date: 29 October 2011
- Venue: Markaziy Stadium, Qarshi
- Referee: Kim Dong-Jin (Korea Republic)
- Attendance: 15,753
- Weather: Clear and very cool, 8°C

The 2011 AFC Cup final was a football match which was played on Saturday, 29 October 2011, to determine the champion of the 2011 AFC Cup. It was the final of the 8th edition of the AFC Cup, a competition organized by the Asian Football Confederation (AFC) for clubs from "developing countries" in Asia.

Nasaf Qarshi became the first Uzbekistan team to win the AFC Cup with a 2–1 win over Al-Kuwait from Kuwait.

== Venue ==
The AFC decided that the final would be hosted by one of the finalists. This format is the same as the 2009 and 2010 editions. On 7 June 2011, the draw for the quarter-finals, semi-finals and final was made. For the final, the winner of semi-final 1 (played between the winners of quarter-finals 2 and 4) would be the home team, while the winner of semi-final 2 (played between the winners of quarter-finals 1 and 3) would be the away team. Therefore Nasaf Qarshi were the home team, and Al-Kuwait were the away team.

== Road to final ==
(Uzbekistan) Nasaf Qarshi				Round	Al-Kuwait			
Opponent	Result			Group stage	Opponent	Result		
(Lebanon) Al-Ansar	3–0 (H)			Matchday 1	(Oman) Al-Suwaiq	3–1 (A)		
(Yemen) Al-Tilal	3–2 (A)			Matchday 2	(Iraq) Al-Talaba	1–0 (H)		
(India) Dempo	4–0 (A)			Matchday 3	(Jordan) Al-Wehdat	1–3 (H)		
(India) Dempo	9–0 (H)			Matchday 4	(Jordan) Al-Wehdat	0–1 (A)		
(Lebanon) Al-Ansar	4–1 (A)			Matchday 5	(Oman) Al-Suwaiq	0–0 (H)		
(Yemen) Al-Tilal	7–1 (H)			Matchday 6	(Iraq) Al-Talaba	2–1 (A)		
Group A winner: Team / Pld / W / D / L / GF / GA / GD / Pts; (Uzbekistan) Nasaf Qarshi / 6 / 6 / 0 / 0 / 30 / 4 / +26 / 18; (India) Dempo / 6 / 2 / 1 / 3 / 6 / 19 / −13 / 7; (Lebanon) Al-Ansar / 6 / 2 / 0 / 4 / 8 / 12 / −4 / 6; (Yemen) Al-Tilal / 6 / 1 / 1 / 4 / 9 / 18 / −9 / 4				Final standings	Group D runner-up: Team / Pld / W / D / L / GF / GA / GD / Pts; (Jordan) Al-Wehdat / 6 / 4 / 2 / 0 / 11 / 3 / +8 / 14; Al-Kuwait / 6 / 3 / 1 / 2 / 7 / 6 / +1 / 10; (Iraq) Al-Talaba / 6 / 1 / 2 / 3 / 4 / 6 / −2 / 5; (Oman) Al-Suwaiq / 6 / 0 / 3 / 3 / 5 / 12 / −7 / 3			
Opponent	Agg.	1st leg	2nd leg	Knockout phase	Opponent	Agg.	1st leg	2nd leg
(Jordan) Al-Faisaly	2–1 (H) (one-leg match)			Round of 16	(Kuwait) Al-Qadsia	2–2 (aet) (3–2 p) (A) (one-leg match)		
(Thailand) Chonburi	1–1 (4–3 p)	1–0 (A)	0–1 (aet) (H)	Quarterfinals	(Thailand) Muangthong United	1–0	1–0 (H)	0–0 (A)
(Jordan) Al-Wehdat	2–1	1–0 (H)	1–1 (A)	Semifinals	(Iraq) Arbil	5–3	2–0 (A)	3–3 (H)

== Match details ==
29 October 2011
19:00 UTC+05:00

Nasaf Qarshi (Uzbekistan)	2 – 1	Al-Kuwait
Shomurodov 62'; Perepļotkins 65'	Report	Kabi 68'

Markaziy Stadium, Qarshi
Attendance: 15,753
Referee: Kim Dong-Jin (Korea Republic)

NASAF QARSHI:
GK	42	(Uzbekistan) Murod Zukhurov	(yellow card) 88'
DF	4	(Uzbekistan) Maksud Karimov
DF	5	(Uzbekistan) Botir Qoraev
DF	34	(Serbia) Bojan Mališić	(yellow card) 89'
MF	7	(Uzbekistan) Jahongir Djiyamurodov
MF	8	(Latvia) Andrejs Perepļotkins
MF	13	(Uzbekistan) Lutfulla Turaev
MF	17	(Turkmenistan) Artur Gevorkyan
MF	20	(Uzbekistan) Erkin Boydullaev
FW	9	(Uzbekistan) Ilkhom Shomurodov		(substituted off) 84'
FW	19	(Montenegro) Ivan Bošković		(substituted off) 90+4'
Substitutions:
MF	18	(Uzbekistan) Fozil Musaev		(substituted on) 84'
DF	16	(Uzbekistan) Artyom Filiposyan		(substituted on) 90+4'
Manager:
(Ukraine) Anatoliy Demyanenko

AL-KUWAIT:
GK	23	(Kuwait) Khaled Al Fadhli
DF	2	(Kuwait) Yaqoub Al Taher
DF	3	(Kuwait) Fahad Awadh
DF	20	(Kuwait) Hussain Hakem	(yellow card) 49'	(substituted off) 80'
DF	25	(Kuwait) Ahmad Al Subaih	(yellow card) 35'	(substituted off) 61'
MF	8	(Mali) Lassana Fané
MF	13	(Jordan) Ra'fat Ali
MF	35	(Kuwait) Naser Al Qahtani
FW	5	(Kuwait) Khaled Al Shammari
FW	10	(Brazil) Rogério
FW	28	(Ivory Coast) Boris Kabi	(yellow card) 26'
Substitutions:
MF	17	(Kuwait) Abdullah Al Buraiki		(substituted on) 61'
MF	11	(Kuwait) Ali Al Kandari		(substituted on) 80'
Manager:
(Croatia) Dragan Talajić

Assistant referees:
Jeong Hae-Sang (Korea Republic)
Lee Jung-Min (Korea Republic)
Fourth official:
Kim Jong-Hyeok (Korea Republic)

== See also ==
- 2011 AFC Cup
