= 2011 AFC Cup knockout stage =

A total of 16 teams, 10 from West Asia and 6 from East Asia, competed in the 2011 AFC Cup knockout stage. They included the 8 group winners and the 8 group runners-up from the group stage.

Each round of this single-elimination tournament was played over one or two matches. In the round of 16, each tie was played in one match, hosted by the winners of each group against the runners-up of another group. In the quarter-finals and semi-finals, each tie was played over two legs on a home-and-away basis. The final was hosted by one of the finalists, decided by draw. The away goals rule (for two-legged ties), extra time (away goals do not apply in extra time) and penalty shootout would be used to decide the winner if necessary.

The matchups for the round of 16 were decided prior to the group stage draw. After the completion of the round of 16, the draw for the quarter-finals, semi-finals, and final was held in Kuala Lumpur, Malaysia on 7 June 2011. In this draw, the "country protection" rule was applied: if there are exactly two clubs from the same country, they may not face each other in the quarter-finals; however, if there are more than two clubs from the same country, they may face each other in the quarter-finals.

== Qualified teams ==
Group	Winners	Runners-up
A	(Uzbekistan) Nasaf Qarshi	(India) Dempo
B	(Kuwait) Al-Qadsia	(Uzbekistan) Shurtan Guzar
C	(Iraq) Duhok	(Jordan) Al-Faisaly
D	(Jordan) Al-Wehdat	Al-Kuwait
E	(Iraq) Arbil	(Lebanon) Al-Ahed
F	(Vietnam) Song Lam Nghe An	(Indonesia) Sriwijaya
G	(Thailand) Muangthong United	(Singapore) Tampines Rovers
H	(Thailand) Chonburi	(Indonesia) Persipura Jayapura

== Bracket ==
While the bracket below shows the entire knockout stage, the draw for the round of 16 matches was determined at the time of the group draw.

The draw for the quarter-finals and beyond was held separately, after the conclusion of the round of 16.

Round of 16
(Thailand) Chonburi	3
(Indonesia) Sriwijaya	0
(Uzbekistan) Nasaf Qarshi	2
(Jordan) Al-Faisaly	1
(Jordan) Al-Wehdat	2
(Uzbekistan) Shurtan Guzar	1
(Iraq) Duhok	1
(India) Dempo	0
(Vietnam) Song Lam Nghe An	1
(Indonesia) Persipura Jayapura	3
(Iraq) Arbil (aet)	1
(Singapore) Tampines Rovers	0
(Kuwait) Al-Qadsia	2(2)
Al-Kuwait (p)	2(3)
(Thailand) Muangthong United	4
(Lebanon) Al-Ahed	0

Quarter-finals
(Thailand) Chonburi	0	1	1(3)
(Uzbekistan) Nasaf Qarshi (p)	1	0	1(4)
(Jordan) Al-Wehdat	5	3	8
(Iraq) Duhok	1	0	1
(Indonesia) Persipura Jayapura	1	0	1
(Iraq) Arbil	2	1	3
Al-Kuwait	1	0	1
(Thailand) Muangthong United	0	0	0

Semi-finals
(Uzbekistan) Nasaf Qarshi	1	1	2
(Jordan) Al-Wehdat	0	1	1
(Iraq) Arbil	0	3	3
Al-Kuwait	2	3	5

Final
(Uzbekistan) Nasaf Qarshi	2
Al-Kuwait	1

== Round of 16 ==
The matches were played 24–25 May 2011.

Team 1	Score	Team 2
Nasaf Qarshi (Uzbekistan)	2–1	(Jordan) Al-Faisaly
Duhok (Iraq)	1–0	(India) Dempo
Al-Qadsia (Kuwait)	2–2 (aet) (2–3 p)	Al-Kuwait
Al-Wehdat (Jordan)	2–1	(Uzbekistan) Shurtan Guzar
Arbil (Iraq)	1–0 (aet)	(Singapore) Tampines Rovers
Muangthong United (Thailand)	4–0	(Lebanon) Al-Ahed
Song Lam Nghe An (Vietnam)	1–3	(Indonesia) Persipura Jayapura
Chonburi (Thailand)	3–0	(Indonesia) Sriwijaya

=== Matches ===
24 May 2011
19:30 UTC+07:00

Muangthong United (Thailand)	4–0	(Lebanon) Al-Ahed
Teerasil 50'; Naruphol 52'; Kouakou 61'; Datsakorn 76'	Report

Thunderdome Stadium, Nonthaburi
Attendance: 9,500
Referee: Peter Green (Australia)

24 May 2011
17:00 UTC+03:00

Duhok (Iraq)	1–0	(India) Dempo
Mushir 18'	Report

Duhok Stadium, Duhok
Attendance: 15,000
Referee: Saeid Mozaffarizadeh (Iran)

24 May 2011
20:00 UTC+05:00

Nasaf Qarshi (Uzbekistan)	2–1	(Jordan) Al-Faisaly
Turaev 28'; Shomurodov 56'	Report	Hijah 78'

Markaziy Stadium, Qarshi
Attendance: 15,000
Referee: Tan Hai (China PR)

24 May 2011
18:30 UTC+03:00

Arbil (Iraq)	1–0 (a.e.t.)	(Singapore) Tampines Rovers
Mubarak 94'	Report

Franso Hariri Stadium, Arbil
Attendance: 17,000
Referee: Valentin Kovalenko (Uzbekistan)

25 May 2011
16:00 UTC+07:00

Song Lam Nghe An (Vietnam)	1–3	(Indonesia) Persipura Jayapura
Nguyễn Hồng Việt 58'	Report	B. Solossa 28' (pen.); Bonai 34'; O. Solossa 85'

Vinh Stadium, Vinh
Attendance: 5,000
Referee: Andre El Haddad (Lebanon)

25 May 2011
19:00 UTC+07:00

Chonburi (Thailand)	3–0	(Indonesia) Sriwijaya
Ney Fabiano 18'; Therdsak 29' (pen.); Natthaphong 83'	Report

IPE Chonburi Stadium, Chonburi
Attendance: 6,954
Referee: Abdullah Al Hilali (Oman)

25 May 2011
19:00 UTC+03:00

Al-Wehdat (Jordan)	2–1	(Uzbekistan) Shurtan Guzar
R. Ali 12'; Bahdari 84'	Report	Sultonov 23'

King Abdullah Stadium, Amman
Attendance: 16,000
Referee: Liu Kwok Man (Hong Kong)

25 May 2011
19:20 UTC+03:00

Al-Qadsia (Kuwait)	2–2 (a.e.t.)	Al-Kuwait
H. Al Enezi 55'; Al Mejmed 65' (pen.)	Report	A. Al Kandari 33'; Al Ajmi 60'
Penalties
Al Mejmed (penalty missed); El Adoua (penalty scored); Fadel (penalty missed); F. Al Enezi (penalty scored); Al Misha'an (penalty missed)	2–3	(penalty missed) Al Ateeqi; (penalty scored) Rogério; (penalty scored) Awadh; (penalty missed) Al Taher; (penalty scored) Al Fadhli

Mohammed Al-Hamad Stadium, Hawally
Attendance: 4,500
Referee: Mohamed Al Zarooni (UAE)

== Quarter-finals ==
The first legs were played 13 September 2011, and the second legs were played 27–28 September 2011.

Team 1	Agg.	Team 2	1st leg	2nd leg
Persipura Jayapura (Indonesia)	1–3	(Iraq) Arbil	1–2	0–1
Chonburi (Thailand)	1–1 (3–4 p)	(Uzbekistan) Nasaf Qarshi	0–1	1–0 (aet)
Al-Kuwait	1–0	(Thailand) Muangthong United	1–0	0–0
Al-Wehdat (Jordan)	8–1	(Iraq) Duhok	5–1	3–0

=== First legs ===
13 September 2011
15:30 UTC+09:00

Persipura Jayapura (Indonesia)	1–2	(Iraq) Arbil
Krangar 82'	Report	Sabah 18'; Mubarak 70'

Mandala Stadium, Jayapura
Attendance: 15,430
Referee: Peter Green (Australia)

13 September 2011
19:00 UTC+07:00

Chonburi (Thailand)	0–1	(Uzbekistan) Nasaf Qarshi
	Report	Bošković 47'

IPE Chonburi Stadium, Chonburi
Attendance: 6,434
Referee: Hiroyoshi Takayama (Japan)

13 September 2011
18:30 UTC+03:00

Al-Kuwait	1–0	(Thailand) Muangthong United
Rogerinho 76'	Report

Al Kuwait Sports Club Stadium, Kuwait City
Attendance: 4,000
Referee: Valentin Kovalenko (Uzbekistan)

13 September 2011
19:00 UTC+03:00

Al-Wehdat (Jordan)	5–1	(Iraq) Duhok
Abdel-Fattah 32' (pen.), 88'; Abdullah Deeb 72'; Shelbaieh 86', 90+3'	Report	H. Kareem 14'

King Abdullah Stadium, Amman
Attendance: 7,000
Referee: Andre El Haddad (Lebanon)

=== Second legs ===
27 September 2011
19:30 UTC+07:00

Muangthong United (Thailand)	0–0	Al-Kuwait
	Report

Thunderdome Stadium, Nonthaburi
Attendance: 11,212
Referee: Choi Myung-Yong (Korea Republic)

Al-Kuwait won 1–0 on aggregate.

27 September 2011
19:00 UTC+05:00

Nasaf Qarshi (Uzbekistan)	0–1 (a.e.t.)	(Thailand) Chonburi
	Report	Ney Fabiano 54'
Penalties
Bošković (penalty scored); Turaev (penalty scored); Djiyamurodov (penalty scored); Otakuziyev (penalty scored); Gevorkyan (penalty missed)	4–3	(penalty missed) Ney Fabiano; (penalty scored) Phanuwat; (penalty scored) Suppasek; (penalty scored) Phaisan; (penalty missed) Therdsak

Markaziy Stadium, Qarshi
Attendance: 13,467
Referee: Muhsen Basma (Syria)

1–1 on aggregate; Nasaf Qarshi won on penalties.

27 September 2011
18:00 UTC+03:00

Arbil (Iraq)	1–0	(Indonesia) Persipura Jayapura
Radhi 60'	Report

Franso Hariri Stadium, Arbil
Attendance: 8,000
Referee: Saeid Mozaffarizadeh (Iran)

Arbil won 3–1 on aggregate.

28 September 2011
16:30 UTC+03:00

Duhok (Iraq)	0–3	(Jordan) Al-Wehdat
	Report	Abdel-Fattah 6', 60'; Al-Sabah 44'

Duhok Stadium, Duhok
Attendance: 12,000
Referee: Mohamed Al Zarooni (UAE)

Al-Wehdat won 8–1 on aggregate.

== Semi-finals ==
The first legs were played 4 October 2011, and the second legs were played 18 October 2011.

Team 1	Agg.	Team 2	1st leg	2nd leg
Nasaf Qarshi (Uzbekistan)	2–1	(Jordan) Al-Wehdat	1–0	1–1
Arbil (Iraq)	3–5	Al-Kuwait	0–2	3–3

=== First legs ===
4 October 2011
19:45 UTC+05:00

Nasaf Qarshi (Uzbekistan)	1–0	(Jordan) Al-Wehdat
Djiyamurodov 45' (pen.)	Report

Markaziy Stadium, Qarshi
Attendance: 13,650
Referee: Liu Kwok Man (Hong Kong)

Note: Match delayed from original kickoff at 19:00 due to sandstorm.

4 October 2011
18:00 UTC+03:00

Arbil (Iraq)	0–2	Al-Kuwait
	Report	Al Ateeqi 39' (pen.); Kabi 80'

Franso Hariri Stadium, Arbil
Attendance: 13,500
Referee: Abdullah Balideh (Qatar)

=== Second legs ===
18 October 2011
17:45 UTC+03:00

Al-Kuwait	3–3	(Iraq) Arbil
Kabi 6'; Rogerinho 74'; Al Shammari 79'	Report	Karim 21' (pen.), 84' (pen.); Salah 69'

Al Kuwait Sports Club Stadium, Kuwait City
Attendance: 3,000
Referee: Minoru Tōjō (Japan)

Al-Kuwait won 5–3 on aggregate.

18 October 2011
19:00 UTC+03:00

Al-Wehdat (Jordan)	1–1	(Uzbekistan) Nasaf Qarshi
Abdallah Deeb 11'	Report	Bošković 62'

King Abdullah Stadium, Amman
Attendance: 14,800
Referee: Mohsen Torky (Iran)

Nasaf Qarshi won 2–1 on aggregate.

== Final ==
The final was played 29 October 2011 at home of one of the finalists, decided by draw.

29 October 2011
19:00 UTC+05:00

Nasaf Qarshi (Uzbekistan)	2–1	Al-Kuwait
Shomurodov 62'; Perepļotkins 65'	Report	Kabi 68'

Markaziy Stadium, Qarshi
Attendance: 15,753
Referee: Kim Dong-Jin (Korea Republic)
