= 2011 AFC Cup group stage =

Football tournament group stage

A total of 32 teams, 20 from West Asia and 12 from East Asia, competed in the 2011 AFC Cup group stage. They included 28 direct entries and 4 losers of the 2011 AFC Champions League qualifying play-off (two from West Asia and two from East Asia).

The draw for the group stage was held in Kuala Lumpur, Malaysia on 7 December 2010. The 32 teams were drawn into eight groups of four. Clubs from the same country could not be drawn into the same group.

In each group, teams played each other home-and-away in a round-robin format. The matchdays were 1–2 March, 15–16 March, 12–13 April, 26–27 April, 3–4 May, and 10–11 May 2011.

The winners and runners-up of each group advanced to the knockout stage.

== Tiebreakers ==
The clubs are ranked according to points and tie breakers are in following order:

1. Greater number of points obtained in the group matches between the teams concerned;
2. Goal difference resulting from the group matches between the teams concerned;
3. Greater number of goals scored in the group matches between the teams concerned; (Away goals do not apply)
4. Goal difference in all the group matches;
5. Greater number of goals scored in all the group matches;
6. Kicks from the penalty mark if only two teams are involved and they are both on the field of play;
7. Fewer score calculated according to the number of yellow and red cards received in the group matches; (1 point for each yellow card, 3 points for each red card as a consequence of two yellow cards, 3 points for each direct red card, 4 points for each yellow card followed by a direct red card)
8. Drawing of lots.

== Groups ==
=== Group A ===
| Team | Pld | W | D | L | GF | GA | GD | Pts | NAS | DEM | ANS | TIL |
|---|---|---|---|---|---|---|---|---|---|---|---|---|
| (Uzbekistan) Nasaf Qarshi | 6 | 6 | 0 | 0 | 30 | 4 | +26 | 18 | | 9–0 | 3–0 | 7–1 |
| (India) Dempo | 6 | 2 | 1 | 3 | 6 | 19 | −13 | 7 | 0–4 | | 2–1 | 2–1 |
| (Lebanon) Al-Ansar | 6 | 2 | 0 | 4 | 8 | 12 | −4 | 6 | 1–4 | 2–0 | | 0–2 |
| (Yemen) Al-Tilal | 6 | 1 | 1 | 4 | 9 | 18 | −9 | 4 | 2–3 | 2–2 | 1–4 | |

1 March 2011
18:30 UTC+05:30

| Dempo (India) | 2–1 | (Yemen) Al-Tilal |
|---|---|---|
| Beto 51'; Soleye 67' | Report | Tafese 77' |

Shree Shiv Chhatrapati Sports Complex, Balewadi
Attendance: 1,000
Referee: Yousef Al-Marzouq (Kuwait)
1 March 2011
19:00 UTC+05:00

| Nasaf Qarshi (Uzbekistan) | 3–0 | (Lebanon) Al-Ansar |
|---|---|---|
| Bosković 44'; Pereplotkins 72'; Otakuziyev 77' | Report |

Markaziy Stadium, Qarshi
Attendance: 15,000
Referee: Dmitriy Mashentsev (Kyrgyzstan)

15 March 2011
16:00 UTC+03:00

| Al-Tilal (Yemen) | 2–3 | (Uzbekistan) Nasaf Qarshi |
|---|---|---|
| Geleta 50'; Motshumba 62' | Report | Turaev 13'; Karimov 65'; Gevorkyan 88' |

Al Tilal Stadium, Aden
Attendance: 3,000
Referee: Hettikamkanamge Perera (Sri Lanka)
15 March 2011
17:30 UTC+02:00

| Al-Ansar (Lebanon) | 2–0 | (India) Dempo |
|---|---|---|
| Nascimento 32'; Nasseredine 63' | Report |

Camille Chamoun Sports City Stadium, Beirut
Attendance: 4,000
Referee: Naser Al-Ghafary (Jordan)

12 April 2011
16:00 UTC+03:00

| Al-Tilal (Yemen) | 1–4 | (Lebanon) Al-Ansar |
|---|---|---|
| Geleta 25' | Report | Nasseredine 37', 66'; Nascimento 40'; Kojok 89' |

Prince Mohammed Stadium, Zarqa (Jordan)^{1}
Attendance: 150
Referee: Kadhum Auda (Iraq)
12 April 2011
18:30 UTC+05:30

| Dempo (India) | 0–4 | (Uzbekistan) Nasaf Qarshi |
|---|---|---|
| | Report | Yunusov 4'; Turaev 11'; Mirkholdirshoev 72'; Pereplotkins 84' |

Shree Shiv Chhatrapati Sports Complex, Balewadi
Attendance: 200
Referee: Mohammad Abu Loum (Jordan)

27 April 2011
19:00 UTC+05:00

| Nasaf Qarshi (Uzbekistan) | 9–0 | (India) Dempo |
|---|---|---|
| Bošković 12', 45+2', 56', 77'; Pereplotkins 26'; Shomurodov 28'; Gevorkyan 33', 64'; Mirkholdirshoev 81' | Report |

Markaziy Stadium, Qarshi
Attendance: 12,567
Referee: Rustam Kholov (Tajikistan)
27 April 2011
18:00 UTC+03:00

| Al-Ansar (Lebanon) | 0–2 | (Yemen) Al-Tilal |
|---|---|---|
| | Report | Motshumba 20'; Salem 78' |

Camille Chamoun Sports City Stadium, Beirut
Attendance: 1,000
Referee: Ibrahim Al-Hosni (Oman)

4 May 2011
16:00 UTC+05:30

| Al-Tilal (Yemen) | 2–2 | (India) Dempo |
|---|---|---|
| Al Ghazi 41'; Salem 83' | Report | Beto 28'; Soleye 46' |

Jawaharlal Nehru Stadium, Goa (India)^{2}
Attendance: 3,000
Referee: Ng Kai Lam (Hong Kong)
4 May 2011
18:00 UTC+03:00

| Al-Ansar (Lebanon) | 1–4 | (Uzbekistan) Nasaf Qarshi |
|---|---|---|
| Nasseredine 26' | Report | Bošković 15'; Otakuziyev 89'; Turaev 90+2'; Kamolov 90+4' |

Camille Chamoun Sports City Stadium, Beirut
Attendance: 750
Referee: Ng Chiu Kok (Hong Kong)

11 May 2011
18:30 UTC+05:30

| Dempo (India) | 2–1 | (Lebanon) Al-Ansar |
|---|---|---|
| Beto 23'; Soleye 44' | Report | El Jounaidi 90+3' |

Shree Shiv Chhatrapati Sports Complex, Balewadi
Attendance: 200
Referee: Salah Abbas Alabbasi (Bahrain)
11 May 2011
19:00 UTC+05:00

| Nasaf Qarshi (Uzbekistan) | 7–1 | (Yemen) Al-Tilal |
|---|---|---|
| Bošković 4', 30'; Gevorkyan 7'; Otakuziyev 25', 35', 37'; Yunusov 57' | Report | Geleta 32' |

Markaziy Stadium, Qarshi
Attendance: 13,000
Referee: Çarymyrat Gurbanow (Turkmenistan)

Notes

- Note 1: Al-Tilal v Al-Ansar moved to Jordan due to the political situation in Yemen.
- Note 2: Al Tilal v Dempo moved to India due to the political situation in Yemen.

=== Group B ===
| Team | Pld | W | D | L | GF | GA | GD | Pts | QAD | SHU | ITT | SAQ |
|---|---|---|---|---|---|---|---|---|---|---|---|---|
| (Kuwait) Al-Qadsia | 6 | 4 | 2 | 0 | 15 | 5 | +10 | 14 | | 4–0 | 3–2 | 3–0 |
| (Uzbekistan) Shurtan Guzar | 6 | 2 | 3 | 1 | 10 | 8 | +2 | 9 | 1–1 | | 1–1 | 7–2 |
| (Syria) Al-Ittihad | 6 | 2 | 2 | 2 | 7 | 7 | 0 | 8 | 0–2 | 0–0 | | 2–0 |
| (Yemen) Al-Saqr | 6 | 0 | 1 | 5 | 5 | 17 | −12 | 1 | 2–2 | 0–1 | 1–2 | |

1 March 2011
16:00 UTC+03:00

| Al-Saqr (Yemen) | 1–2 | (Syria) Al-Ittihad |
|---|---|---|
| Al Qatta 64' | Report | Konate 52'; Rashid 81' |

Ali Muhesen Stadium, Sanaa
Attendance: 400
Referee: Ibrahim Al-Hosni (Oman)
1 March 2011
18:15 UTC+03:00

| Al-Qadsia (Kuwait) | 4–0 | (Uzbekistan) Shurtan Guzar |
|---|---|---|
| Al Khatib 12'; Al Enezi 56', 70'; Ajab 90+1' | Report |

Mohammed Al-Hamad Stadium, Hawally
Attendance: 500
Referee: Yadollah Jahanbazi (Iran)

15 March 2011
16:30 UTC+05:00

| Shurtan Guzar (Uzbekistan) | 7–2 | (Yemen) Al-Saqr |
|---|---|---|
| Afonin 42', 56'; Vujović 49'; Erkinov 52', 65'; Taran 77'; Ubaydullaev 80' | Report | Abdullah 68'; Ndombe 90+2' |

Ghuzor Stadium, Ghuzor
Attendance: 6,225
Referee: Rustam Kholov (Tajikistan)
15 March 2011
19:00 UTC+02:00

| Al-Ittihad (Syria) | 0–2 | (Kuwait) Al-Qadsia |
|---|---|---|
| | Report | Al Khatib 60'; Al Enezi 90+1' |

Aleppo International Stadium, Aleppo
Attendance: 30,000
Referee: Zakareya Ebrahim Isa Ali (Bahrain)

12 April 2011
18:30 UTC+03:00

| Al-Qadsia (Kuwait) | 3–0 | (Yemen) Al-Saqr |
|---|---|---|
| Al Khatib 10'; Al Enezi 11'; Al Hendi 77' | Report |

Mohammed Al-Hamad Stadium, Hawally
Attendance: 100
Referee: Ali Sabbagh (Lebanon)
13 April 2011
17:00 UTC+05:00

| Shurtan Guzar (Uzbekistan) | 1–1 | (Syria) Al-Ittihad |
|---|---|---|
| Taran 45' | Report | Jugović 3' |

Ghuzor Stadium, Ghuzor
Attendance: 6,350
Referee: Çarymyrat Gurbanow (Turkmenistan)

15 April 2011^{3}
18:30 UTC+03:00

| Al-Saqr (Yemen) | 2–2 | (Kuwait) Al-Qadsia |
|---|---|---|
| Al Tahesh 22'; Abay 59' | Report | Al Khatib 68', 85' |

Mohammed Al-Hamad Stadium, Hawally (Kuwait)^{3}
Attendance: 500
Referee: Salah Abbas Alabbasi (Bahrain)
26 April 2011
19:00 UTC+03:00

| Al-Ittihad (Syria) | 0–0 | (Uzbekistan) Shurtan Guzar |
|---|---|---|
| | Report |

Aleppo International Stadium, Aleppo
Attendance: 8,000
Referee: Naser Al-Ghafary (Jordan)

4 May 2011
17:00 UTC+05:00

| Shurtan Guzar (Uzbekistan) | 1–1 | (Kuwait) Al-Qadsia |
|---|---|---|
| Khazigaliev 69' | Report | Al Khatib 45' |

Ghuzor Stadium, Ghuzor
Attendance: 7,000
Referee: Dmitriy Mashentsev (Kyrgyzstan)
4 May 2011
19:00 UTC+03:00

| Al-Ittihad (Syria) | 2–0 | (Yemen) Al-Saqr |
|---|---|---|
| Konate 59', 65' (pen.) | Report |

Aleppo International Stadium, Aleppo
Attendance: 6,500
Referee: Kadhum Auda (Iraq)

11 May 2011
16:00 UTC+03:00

| Al-Saqr (Yemen) | 0–1 | (Uzbekistan) Shurtan Guzar |
|---|---|---|
| | Report | Vujović 50' |

Aleppo International Stadium, Aleppo (Syria)^{4}
Attendance: 300
Referee: Apisit Aonrak (Thailand)
11 May 2011
19:00 UTC+03:00

| Al-Qadsia (Kuwait) | 3–2 | (Syria) Al-Ittihad |
|---|---|---|
| Al Misha'an 45'; Al Khatib 57', 59' | Report | Fares 39'; Konate 55' (pen.) |

Mohammed Al-Hamad Stadium, Hawally
Attendance: 2,000
Referee: Kim Sang-Woo (Korea Republic)

Notes

- Note 3: Al-Saqr vs Al-Qadsia moved to Kuwait and brought forward from 26 April 2011 to 15 April 2011 due to the political situation in Yemen.
- Note 4: Al-Saqr vs Shurtan Guzar moved to Syria due to the political situation in Yemen.

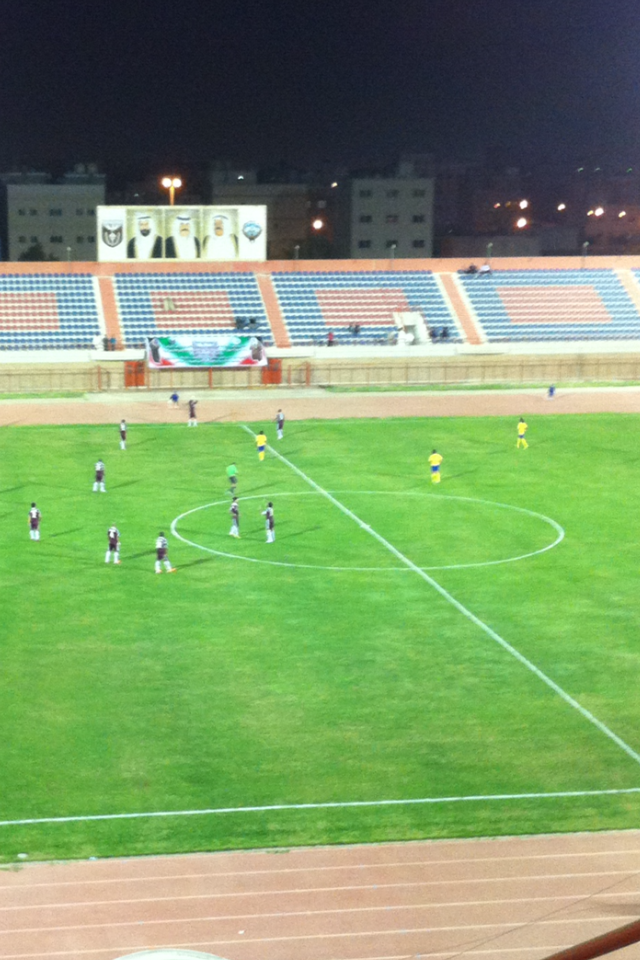
Ali Al-Salem Al-Sabah Stadium, match between Al Naser and Duhok SC

=== Group C ===
| Team | Pld | W | D | L | GF | GA | GD | Pts | DUH | FAI | JAI | NAS |
|---|---|---|---|---|---|---|---|---|---|---|---|---|
| (Iraq) Duhok | 6 | 3 | 2 | 1 | 6 | 3 | +3 | 11 (Note: Tiebreakers: Duhok, Al-Faisaly and Al-Jaish are ranked by their head-to-head records: Duhok (5 pts, +1 GD), Al-Faisaly (5 pts, 0 GD), Al-Jaish (5 pts, –1 GD).) | | 4–2 | 0–1 | 1–0 |
| (Jordan) Al-Faisaly | 6 | 3 | 2 | 1 | 8 | 6 | +2 | 11 | 0–0 | | 2–0 | 2–1 |
| (Syria) Al-Jaish | 6 | 3 | 2 | 1 | 8 | 4 | +4 | 11 | 0–0 | 1–1 | | 2–1 |
| (Kuwait) Al-Nasr | 6 | 0 | 0 | 6 | 2 | 11 | −9 | 0 | 0–1 | 0–1 | 0–4 | |

Notes:

Tiebreakers
| Team | Pld | W | D | L | GF | GA | GD | Pts |
|---|---|---|---|---|---|---|---|---|
| (Iraq) Duhok | 4 | 1 | 2 | 1 | 4 | 3 | +1 | 5 |
| (Jordan) Al-Faisaly | 4 | 1 | 2 | 1 | 5 | 5 | 0 | 5 |
| (Syria) Al-Jaish | 4 | 1 | 2 | 1 | 2 | 3 | −1 | 5 |

2 March 2011
17:00 UTC+02:00

| Al-Faisaly (Jordan) | 2–0 | (Syria) Al-Jaish |
|---|---|---|
| Bani Attiah 17'; Al-Maharmeh 60' | Report |

King Abdullah Stadium, Amman
Attendance: 3,000
Referee: Mukhtar Al Yarimi (Yemen)
2 March 2011
18:00 UTC+03:00

| Al-Nasr (Kuwait) | 0–1 | (Iraq) Duhok |
|---|---|---|
| | Report | Haji 20' |

Sabah Al Salem Stadium, Kuwait City
Attendance: 1,000
Referee: Vladislav Tseytlin (Uzbekistan)

16 March 2011
15:30 UTC+03:00

| Duhok (Iraq) | 4–2 | (Jordan) Al-Faisaly |
|---|---|---|
| Suliman 25'; Jarjis 39'; Salah 78'; Mnajed 90+2' | Report | Bani Attiah 20', 34' |

Duhok Stadium, Duhok
Attendance: 17,000
Referee: Ali Abdulnabi (Bahrain)
16 March 2011
17:00 UTC+02:00

| Al-Jaish (Syria) | 2–1 | (Kuwait) Al-Nasr |
|---|---|---|
| Al Haj 7'; Al Baour 70' | Report | Al Zeno 90+3' |

Abbasiyyin Stadium, Damascus
Attendance: 9,000
Referee: Çarymyrat Gurbanow (Turkmenistan)

12 April 2011
17:00 UTC+03:00

| Al-Faisaly (Jordan) | 2–1 | (Kuwait) Al-Nasr |
|---|---|---|
| Al-Attar 16'; Al-Maharmeh 21' | Report | Jairo 85' |

King Abdullah Stadium, Amman
Attendance: 3,000
Referee: Apisit Aonrak (Thailand)
12 April 2011
18:00 UTC+03:00

| Al-Jaish (Syria) | 0–0 | (Iraq) Duhok |
|---|---|---|
| | Report |

Abbasiyyin Stadium, Damascus
Attendance: 1,000
Referee: Kim Sang-Woo (Korea Republic)

27 April 2011
16:30 UTC+03:00

| Duhok (Iraq) | 0–1 | (Syria) Al-Jaish |
|---|---|---|
| | Report | Al Sayed 53' |

Duhok Stadium, Duhok
Attendance: 20,000
Referee: Banjar Al-Dosari (Qatar)
27 April 2011
18:45 UTC+03:00

| Al-Nasr (Kuwait) | 0–1 | (Jordan) Al-Faisaly |
|---|---|---|
| | Report | Al-Maharmeh 60' |

Sabah Al Salem Stadium, Kuwait City
Attendance: 500
Referee: Lee Min-Hu (Korea Republic)

3 May 2011
16:30 UTC+03:00

| Duhok (Iraq) | 1–0 | (Kuwait) Al-Nasr |
|---|---|---|
| Jarjis 88' | Report |

Duhok Stadium, Duhok
Attendance: 15,000
Referee: Ali Sabbagh (Lebanon)
3 May 2011
19:00 UTC+03:00

| Al-Jaish (Syria) | 1–1 | (Jordan) Al-Faisaly |
|---|---|---|
| Esmaeel 90+4' | Report | Mubaideen 78' |

Abbasiyyin Stadium, Damascus
Attendance: 2,000
Referee: Hedayat Mombeni (Iran)

10 May 2011
19:00 UTC+03:00

| Al-Faisaly (Jordan) | 0–0 | (Iraq) Duhok |
|---|---|---|
| | Report |

Amman International Stadium, Amman^{5}
Attendance: 8,000
Referee: Tayeb Hasan Shamsuzzaman (Bangladesh)
10 May 2011
19:00 UTC+03:00

| Al-Nasr (Kuwait) | 0–4 | (Syria) Al-Jaish |
|---|---|---|
| | Report | Sabagh 51'; Al Haj 62'; Esmaeel 71'; Akra 90+1' |

Sabah Al Salem Stadium, Kuwait City
Attendance: 128
Referee: Rustam Kholov (Tajikistan)

Notes

- Note 5: Al-Faisaly v Duhok moved to Amman International Stadium at Amman.

=== Group D ===
| Team | Pld | W | D | L | GF | GA | GD | Pts | WEH | KUW | TAL | SUW |
|---|---|---|---|---|---|---|---|---|---|---|---|---|
| (Jordan) Al-Wehdat | 6 | 4 | 2 | 0 | 11 | 3 | +8 | 14 | | 1–0 | 0–0 | 5–1 |
| Al-Kuwait | 6 | 3 | 1 | 2 | 7 | 6 | +1 | 10 | 1–3 | | 1–0 | 0–0 |
| (Iraq) Al-Talaba | 6 | 1 | 2 | 3 | 4 | 6 | −2 | 5 | 0–1 | 1–2 | | 1–1 |
| (Oman) Al-Suwaiq | 6 | 0 | 3 | 3 | 5 | 12 | −7 | 3 | 1–1 | 1–3 | 1–2 | |

2 March 2011
14:30 UTC+03:00

| Al-Talaba (Iraq) | 0–1 | (Jordan) Al-Wehdat |
|---|---|---|
| | Report | Abu Toaymeh 64' |

Franso Hariri Stadium, Arbil
Attendance: 3,000
Referee: Salah Abbas Alabbasi (Bahrain)
2 March 2011
19:00 UTC+04:00

| Al-Suwaiq (Oman) | 1–3 | Al-Kuwait |
|---|---|---|
| Rabia 31' | Report | Abdel Fattah 7', 36'; Rogerinho 22' |

Al-Seeb Stadium, Al-Seeb
Attendance: 500
Referee: Pratap Singh (India)

16 March 2011
17:00 UTC+02:00

| Al-Wehdat (Jordan) | 5–1 | (Oman) Al-Suwaiq |
|---|---|---|
| Attal 3'; Shelbaieh 7' (pen.), 57'; Abu Hwaiti 9'; Abdul-Haleem 74' | Report | Al-Alawi 72' |

King Abdullah Stadium, Amman
Attendance: 2,000
Referee: Vladislav Tseytlin (Uzbekistan)
16 March 2011
19:45 UTC+03:00

| Al-Kuwait | 1–0 | (Iraq) Al-Talaba |
|---|---|---|
| Jumaa 58' | Report |

Al Kuwait Sports Club Stadium, Kuwait City
Attendance: 600
Referee: Mukhtar Al Yarimi (Yemen)

13 April 2011
19:30 UTC+04:00

| Al-Suwaiq (Oman) | 1–2 | (Iraq) Al-Talaba |
|---|---|---|
| Al-Alawi 71' | Report | Qassim 23'; Jabbar 43' |

Al-Seeb Stadium, Al-Seeb
Attendance: 150
Referee: Liu Kwok Man (Hong Kong)
13 April 2011
20:00 UTC+03:00

| Al-Kuwait | 1–3 | (Jordan) Al-Wehdat |
|---|---|---|
| Al Kandari 27' | Report | Abu Hwaiti 29'; Shelbaieh 44', 80' |

Al Kuwait Sports Club Stadium, Kuwait City
Attendance: 1,112
Referee: Ryuji Sato (Japan)

26 April 2011
15:00 UTC+03:00

| Al-Talaba (Iraq) | 1–1 | (Oman) Al-Suwaiq |
|---|---|---|
| Jabbar 8' | Report | Al-Saadi 75' |

Franso Hariri Stadium, Arbil
Attendance: 1,000
Referee: Tayeb Hasan Shamsuzzaman (Bangladesh)
26 April 2011
19:00 UTC+03:00

| Al-Wehdat (Jordan) | 1–0 | Al-Kuwait |
|---|---|---|
| Ali 46' | Report |

King Abdullah Stadium, Amman
Attendance: 7,000
Referee: Ali Abdulnabi (Bahrain)

3 May 2011
19:00 UTC+03:00

| Al-Wehdat (Jordan) | 0–0 | (Iraq) Al-Talaba |
|---|---|---|
| | Report |

King Abdullah Stadium, Amman
Attendance: 2,000
Referee: Vo Minh Tri (Vietnam)
3 May 2011
19:00 UTC+03:00

| Al-Kuwait | 0–0 | (Oman) Al-Suwaiq |
|---|---|---|
| | Report |

Al Kuwait Sports Club Stadium, Kuwait City
Attendance: 400
Referee: Chaiya Mahapab (Thailand)

10 May 2011
18:00 UTC+03:00

| Al-Talaba (Iraq) | 1–2 | Al-Kuwait |
|---|---|---|
| Abood 76' | Report | Al Ajmi 63'; Al Ateeqi 89' (pen.) |

Franso Hariri Stadium, Arbil
Attendance: 3,000
Referee: Banjar Al-Dosari (Qatar)
10 May 2011
19:30 UTC+04:00

| Al-Suwaiq (Oman) | 1–1 | (Jordan) Al-Wehdat |
|---|---|---|
| Al-Alawi 34' | Report | Barghouthi 87' |

Al-Seeb Stadium, Al-Seeb
Attendance: 600
Referee: Lee Min-Hu (Korea Republic)

=== Group E ===
| Team | Pld | W | D | L | GF | GA | GD | Pts | ARB | AHE | ORU | KAR |
|---|---|---|---|---|---|---|---|---|---|---|---|---|
| (Iraq) Arbil | 6 | 4 | 2 | 0 | 17 | 4 | +13 | 14 | | 6–2 | 0–0 | 1–1 |
| (Lebanon) Al-Ahed | 6 | 2 | 0 | 4 | 11 | 13 | −2 | 6 (Note: Tiebreakers: Al-Ahed, Al-Orouba and Al-Karamah are ranked by their head-to-head records: Al-Ahed (6 pts, +3 GD), Al-Orouba (5 pts, –1 GD), Al-Karamah (5 pts, –2 GD).) | 1–2 | | 2–0 | 4–1 |
| (Oman) Al-Orouba | 6 | 1 | 3 | 2 | 4 | 10 | −6 | 6 | 0–5 | 1–0 | | 1–1 |
| (Syria) Al-Karamah | 6 | 1 | 3 | 2 | 8 | 13 | −5 | 6 | 0–3 | 3–2 | 2–2 | |

Notes:

Tiebreakers
| Team | Pld | W | D | L | GF | GA | GD | Pts |
|---|---|---|---|---|---|---|---|---|
| (Lebanon) Al-Ahed | 4 | 2 | 0 | 2 | 8 | 5 | +3 | 6 |
| (Oman) Al-Orouba | 4 | 1 | 2 | 1 | 4 | 5 | −1 | 5 |
| (Syria) Al-Karamah | 4 | 1 | 2 | 1 | 7 | 9 | −2 | 5 |

1 March 2011
18:00 UTC+02:00

| Al-Ahed (Lebanon) | 1–2 | (Iraq) Arbil |
|---|---|---|
| Maatouk 87' (pen.) | Report | Salah 38'; Khudhair 47' |

Camille Chamoun Sports City Stadium, Beirut
Attendance: 1,500
Referee: Rustam Kholov (Tajikistan)
1 March 2011
19:00 UTC+02:00

| Al-Karamah (Syria) | 2–2 | (Oman) Al-Orouba |
|---|---|---|
| Hamwi 2'; Aodi 25' | Report | Al-Mashari 48'; Al-Farsi 67' |

Khaled Ibn Al Walid Stadium, Homs
Attendance: 11,254
Referee: Apisit Aonrak (Thailand)

15 March 2011
17:00 UTC+03:00

| Arbil (Iraq) | 1–1 | (Syria) Al-Karamah |
|---|---|---|
| Ahmad 66' | Report | Al Nakdali 37' |

Franso Hariri Stadium, Arbil
Attendance: 21,000
Referee: Ali Shaban (Kuwait)
15 March 2011
19:00 UTC+04:00

| Al-Orouba (Oman) | 1–0 | (Lebanon) Al-Ahed |
|---|---|---|
| Al-Mashari 25' | Report |

Seeb Stadium, Muscat
Attendance: 400
Referee: Dmitriy Mashentsev (Kyrgyzstan)

12 April 2011
18:00 UTC+03:00

| Al-Ahed (Lebanon) | 4–1 | (Syria) Al-Karamah |
|---|---|---|
| El Ali 45+1'; Maatouk 85'; Dakik 90+2'; Bazzi 90+4' | Report | Maowas 60' |

Camille Chamoun Sports City Stadium, Beirut
Attendance: 1,200
Referee: Chaiya Mahapab (Thailand)
12 April 2011
18:00 UTC+03:00

| Arbil (Iraq) | 0–0 | (Oman) Al-Orouba |
|---|---|---|
| | Report |

Franso Hariri Stadium, Arbil
Attendance: 12,000
Referee: Mukhtar Al Yarimi (Yemen)

27 April 2011
16:00 UTC+03:00

| Al-Karamah (Syria) | 3–2 | (Lebanon) Al-Ahed |
|---|---|---|
| Al Hussain 37'; Hamwi 42', 66' | Report | El Ali 47'; Bazzi 79' |

Abbasiyyin Stadium, Damascus^{6}
Attendance: 300
Referee: Ali Shaban (Kuwait)
27 April 2011
19:00 UTC+04:00

| Al-Orouba (Oman) | 0–5 | (Iraq) Arbil |
|---|---|---|
| | Report | Mubarak 4', 90+4'; Al Daoudi 8' (o.g.); Shakour 65'; Khalaf 80' |

Seeb Stadium, Muscat
Attendance: 300
Referee: Vladislav Tseytlin (Uzbekistan)

4 May 2011
18:00 UTC+03:00

| Arbil (Iraq) | 6–2 | (Lebanon) Al-Ahed |
|---|---|---|
| Mubarak 10'; Ahmad 27', 78'; Qaraman 33'; Zeineddine 37' (o.g.); Mohammed 89' | Report | El Ali 16'; Dakik 19' |

Franso Hariri Stadium, Arbil
Attendance: 13,500
Referee: Naser Al-Ghafary (Jordan)
4 May 2011
19:00 UTC+04:00

| Al-Orouba (Oman) | 1–1 | (Syria) Al-Karamah |
|---|---|---|
| Al-Wahaibi 29' | Report | Hamwi 8' |

Seeb Stadium, Muscat
Attendance: 200
Referee: Mohammad Abu Loum (Jordan)

11 May 2011
20:00 UTC+03:00

| Al-Ahed (Lebanon) | 2–0 | (Oman) Al-Orouba |
|---|---|---|
| El Ali 55'; Maatouk 78' (pen.) | Report |

Camille Chamoun Sports City Stadium, Beirut
Attendance: 200
Referee: Ryuji Sato (Japan)
11 May 2011
20:00 UTC+03:00

| Al-Karamah (Syria) | 0–3 | (Iraq) Arbil |
|---|---|---|
| | Report | Abdul-Amir 43'; Ahmad 70'; Shakour 80' |

Abbasiyyin Stadium, Damascus^{6}
Attendance: 1,000
Referee: Yadollah Jahanbazi (Iran)

Notes

- Note 6: Last two home matches of Al-Karamah moved to Abbasiyyin Stadium at Damascus after approval by AFC.

=== Group F ===
| Team | Pld | W | D | L | GF | GA | GD | Pts | SLN | SRW | TSW | VB |
|---|---|---|---|---|---|---|---|---|---|---|---|---|
| (Vietnam) Sông Lam Nghệ An | 6 | 4 | 0 | 2 | 16 | 10 | +6 | 12 | | 4–0 | 1–2 | 4–2 |
| (Indonesia) Sriwijaya | 6 | 3 | 1 | 2 | 9 | 11 | −2 | 10 | 3–1 | | 3–2 | 1–1 |
| (Hong Kong) TSW Pegasus | 6 | 3 | 0 | 3 | 15 | 12 | +3 | 9 | 2–3 | 1–2 | | 3–0 |
| (Maldives) VB | 6 | 1 | 1 | 4 | 9 | 16 | −7 | 4 | 1–3 | 2–0 | 3–5 | |

1 March 2011
15:30 UTC+07:00

| Sriwijaya (Indonesia) | 1–1 | (Maldives) VB |
|---|---|---|
| Douglas 67' (o.g.) | Report | Ali 56' |

Jakabaring Stadium, Palembang
Attendance: 5,403
Referee: Fan Qi (China P.R.)
1 March 2011
16:00 UTC+07:00

| Sông Lam Nghệ An (Vietnam) | 1–2 | (Hong Kong) TSW Pegasus |
|---|---|---|
| Nguyễn Hồng Việt 13' | Report | Itaparica 82' (pen.); Guy 84' |

Vinh Stadium, Vinh
Attendance: 5,000
Referee: Mohd Nafeez Abdul Wahab (Malaysia)

15 March 2011
16:00 UTC+05:00

| VB (Maldives) | 1–3 | (Vietnam) Sông Lam Nghệ An |
|---|---|---|
| Ashfaq 18' | Report | Nguyễn Quang Tình 20'; Nguyễn Ngọc Anh 60'; Ngô Hoàng Thịnh 85' |

National Stadium, Male
Attendance: 4,500
Referee: Yu Ming-hsun (Chinese Taipei)
15 March 2011
20:00 UTC+08:00

| TSW Pegasus (Hong Kong) | 1–2 | (Indonesia) Sriwijaya |
|---|---|---|
| Carrijó 71' | Report | Gumbs 3'; Diano 90+5' |

Tseung Kwan O Sports Ground, Hong Kong
Attendance: 1,385
Referee: Sgt. Win Cho (Myanmar)

13 April 2011
15:30 UTC+07:00

| Sriwijaya (Indonesia) | 3–1 | (Vietnam) Sông Lam Nghệ An |
|---|---|---|
| Gumbs 13'; Gathuessi 76'; Sudarsono 78' | Report | Nguyễn Công Mạnh 58' |

Jakabaring Stadium, Palembang
Attendance: 5,200
Referee: Ko Hyung-Jin (Korea Republic)
13 April 2011
16:00 UTC+05:00

| VB (Maldives) | 3–5 | (Hong Kong) TSW Pegasus |
|---|---|---|
| Mansaray 48'; Qasim 67'; Easa 90+1' | Report | Carrijó 15', 22', 24'; Lai Yiu Cheong 43'; Haneef 50' (o.g.) |

National Stadium, Male
Attendance: 1,500
Referee: Ali Shaban (Kuwait)

26 April 2011
16:00 UTC+07:00

| Sông Lam Nghệ An (Vietnam) | 4–0 | (Indonesia) Sriwijaya |
|---|---|---|
| Ngale 24', 33'; Fagan 57'; Bryan 61' | Report |

Vinh Stadium, Vinh
Attendance: 6,000
Referee: Yousef Al-Marzouq (Kuwait)
26 April 2011
20:00 UTC+08:00

| TSW Pegasus (Hong Kong) | 3–0 | (Maldives) VB |
|---|---|---|
| Itaparica 35'; Chan Ming Kong 45+1'; Carrijó 90+3' (pen.) | Report |

Tseung Kwan O Sports Ground, Hong Kong
Attendance: 1,005
Referee: Kim Jong-Hyeok (Korea Republic)

4 May 2011
16:00 UTC+05:00

| VB (Maldives) | 2–0 | (Indonesia) Sriwijaya |
|---|---|---|
| Qasim 10'; Lareef 81' | Report |

National Stadium, Male
Attendance: 1,000
Referee: Marai Al Awaji (Saudi Arabia)
4 May 2011
20:00 UTC+08:00

| TSW Pegasus (Hong Kong) | 2–3 | (Vietnam) Sông Lam Nghệ An |
|---|---|---|
| Carrijó 35', 75' | Report | Phan Như Thuật 45+2'; Bryan 84'; Ngô Hoàng Thịnh 90+2' |

Tseung Kwan O Sports Ground, Hong Kong
Attendance: 913
Referee: Abdulla Hassan Mohamed (UAE)

11 May 2011
15:30 UTC+07:00

| Sriwijaya (Indonesia) | 3–2 | (Hong Kong) TSW Pegasus |
|---|---|---|
| Gumbs 36'; Nasir 59'; Lasut 88' | Report | Lai Yiu Cheong 30'; Lee Hong Lim 75' |

Jakabaring Stadium, Palembang
Attendance: 15,000
Referee: Pratap Singh (India)
11 May 2011
16:00 UTC+07:00

| Sông Lam Nghệ An (Vietnam) | 4–2 | (Maldives) VB |
|---|---|---|
| Phan Như Thuật 19'; Nguyễn Công Mạnh 52'; Ngale 58'; Bryan 60' | Report | Ashfaq 89' (pen.); Mansaray 90+1' |

Vinh Stadium, Vinh
Attendance: 4,000
Referee: Ali Abdulnabi (Bahrain)

=== Group G ===
| Team | Pld | W | D | L | GF | GA | GD | Pts | MTU | TRV | HTT | VIC |
|---|---|---|---|---|---|---|---|---|---|---|---|---|
| (Thailand) Muangthong United | 6 | 4 | 2 | 0 | 14 | 1 | +13 | 14 | | 4–0 | 4–0 | 1–0 |
| (Singapore) Tampines Rovers | 6 | 3 | 2 | 1 | 12 | 8 | +4 | 11 | 1–1 | | 3–1 | 4–0 |
| (Vietnam) Hà Nội T&T | 6 | 2 | 2 | 2 | 5 | 8 | −3 | 8 | 0–0 | 1–1 | | 2–0 |
| (Maldives) Victory | 6 | 0 | 0 | 6 | 1 | 15 | −14 | 0 | 0–4 | 1–3 | 0–1 | |

2 March 2011
16:10 UTC+05:00

| Victory (Maldives) | 1–3 | (Singapore) Tampines Rovers |
|---|---|---|
| Shimaz 90+3' | Report | Croissant 28'; Durić 37'; Ali 88' |

National Stadium, Male
Attendance: 4,500
Referee: Tayeb Hasan Shamsuzzaman (Bangladesh)
2 March 2011
19:30 UTC+07:00

| Muangthong United (Thailand) | 4–0 | (Vietnam) Ha Noi T&T |
|---|---|---|
| Teerasil 21', 90+1'; Kouakou 54'; Anon 59' | Report |

Thunderdome Stadium, Nonthaburi
Attendance: 9,000
Referee: Ng Kai Lam (Hong Kong)

16 March 2011
16:00 UTC+07:00

| Ha Noi T&T (Vietnam) | 2–0 | (Maldives) Victory |
|---|---|---|
| Võ Duy Nam 7'; Cao Sy Cuong 90+3' | Report |

Hàng Đẫy Stadium, Hanoi
Attendance: 450
Referee: Fan Qi (China P.R.)
16 March 2011
19:30 UTC+08:00

| Tampines Rovers (Singapore) | 1–1 | (Thailand) Muangthong United |
|---|---|---|
| Durić 23' | Report | Pichitphong 31' |

Jalan Besar Stadium, Singapore
Attendance: 1,975
Referee: Yadollah Jahanbazi (Iran)

12 April 2011
16:00 UTC+07:00

| Ha Noi T&T (Vietnam) | 1–1 | (Singapore) Tampines Rovers |
|---|---|---|
| Nguyễn Văn Quyết 26' | Report | Durić 79' |

Hàng Đẫy Stadium, Hanoi
Attendance: 1,500
Referee: Pratap Singh (India)
12 April 2011
19:30 UTC+07:00

| Muangthong United (Thailand) | 1–0 | (Maldives) Victory |
|---|---|---|
| Siaka 90+1' | Report |

Thunderdome Stadium, Nonthaburi
Attendance: 6,290
Referee: Mohd Nafeez Abdul Wahab (Malaysia)

27 April 2011
16:10 UTC+05:00

| Victory (Maldives) | 0–4 | (Thailand) Muangthong United |
|---|---|---|
| | Report | Kouakou 8', 45+4'; Naruphol 22'; Kabfah 68' |

National Stadium, Male
Attendance: 3,000
Referee: Hettikamkanamge Perera (Sri Lanka)
27 April 2011
19:30 UTC+08:00

| Tampines Rovers (Singapore) | 3–1 | (Vietnam) Ha Noi T&T |
|---|---|---|
| Latiff 12', 22'; Durić 70' | Report | Marronkle 28' |

Jalan Besar Stadium, Singapore
Attendance: 916
Referee: Strebre Delovski (Australia)

3 May 2011
16:00 UTC+07:00

| Ha Noi T&T (Vietnam) | 0–0 | (Thailand) Muangthong United |
|---|---|---|
| | Report |

Hàng Đẫy Stadium, Hanoi
Attendance: 2,000
Referee: Yu Ming-hsun (Chinese Taipei)
3 May 2011
19:30 UTC+08:00

| Tampines Rovers (Singapore) | 4–0 | (Maldives) Victory |
|---|---|---|
| Sulaiman 18'; Latiff 44'; Durić 57', 80' | Report |

Jalan Besar Stadium, Singapore
Attendance: 876
Referee: Ko Hyung-Jin (Korea Republic)

10 May 2011
16:10 UTC+05:00

| Victory (Maldives) | 0–1 | (Vietnam) Ha Noi T&T |
|---|---|---|
| | Report | Lê Hồng Minh 4' |

National Stadium, Male
Attendance: 600
Referee: Sgt. Win Cho (Myanmar)
10 May 2011
19:30 UTC+07:00

| Muangthong United (Thailand) | 4–0 | (Singapore) Tampines Rovers |
|---|---|---|
| Kouakou 51'; Anon 60', 85'; Jakkraphan 72' | Report |

Thunderdome Stadium, Nonthaburi
Attendance: 7,346
Referee: Yousef Al-Marzouq (Kuwait)

=== Group H ===
| Team | Pld | W | D | L | GF | GA | GD | Pts | CHO | PJY | SCA | KEB |
|---|---|---|---|---|---|---|---|---|---|---|---|---|
| (Thailand) Chonburi | 6 | 4 | 1 | 1 | 18 | 8 | +10 | 13 | | 4–1 | 3–0 | 4–0 |
| (Indonesia) Persipura Jayapura | 6 | 3 | 2 | 1 | 14 | 9 | +5 | 11 | 3–0 | | 4–2 | 4–1 |
| (Hong Kong) South China | 6 | 1 | 2 | 3 | 7 | 14 | −7 | 5 | 0–3 | 1–1 | | 1–0 |
| (India) Kingfisher East Bengal | 6 | 0 | 3 | 3 | 9 | 17 | −8 | 3 | 4–4 | 1–1 | 3–3 | |

Source: RSSSF
2 March 2011
17:00 UTC+05:30

| Kingfisher East Bengal (India) | 4–4 | (Thailand) Chonburi |
|---|---|---|
| Ozbey 8', 22'; Sahni 74'; R. Singh 82' (pen.) | Report | Pipob 29', 47'; Adul 43'; Ekaphan 53' |

Salt Lake Stadium, Kolkata
Attendance: 2,000
Referee: Hettikamkanamge Perera (Sri Lanka)
2 March 2011
20:00 UTC+08:00

| South China (Hong Kong) | 1–1 | (Indonesia) Persipura Jayapura |
|---|---|---|
| Chan Siu Ki 59' | Report | B. Solossa 39' |

Hong Kong Stadium, Hong Kong
Attendance: 9,558
Referee: Ko Hyung-Jin (Korea Republic)

16 March 2011
16:00 UTC+07:00

| Persipura Jayapura (Indonesia) | 4–1 | (India) Kingfisher East Bengal |
|---|---|---|
| Bonai 16'; B. Solossa 19'; Bonsapia 62'; Mandowen 90+3' | Report | Ozbey 22' |

Gelora Bung Karno Stadium, Jakarta
Attendance: 700
Referee: Vo Minh Tri (Vietnam)
16 March 2011
19:00 UTC+07:00

| Chonburi (Thailand) | 3–0 | (Hong Kong) South China |
|---|---|---|
| Natthaphong 27'; Therdsak 83' (pen.); Arthit 90+3' | Report |

IPE Chonburi Stadium, Chonburi
Attendance: 6,500
Referee: Ibrahim Al-Hosni (Oman)

13 April 2011
16:00 UTC+09:00

| Persipura Jayapura (Indonesia) | 3–0 | (Thailand) Chonburi |
|---|---|---|
| Pae 9'; Bonai 43'; Mandowen 83' | Report |

Mandala Stadium, Jayapura^{7}
Attendance: 20,000
Referee: Yu Ming-hsun (Chinese Taipei)
13 April 2011
20:00 UTC+08:00

| South China (Hong Kong) | 1–0 | (India) Kingfisher East Bengal |
|---|---|---|
| Kežman 69' | Report |

Hong Kong Stadium, Hong Kong
Attendance: 7,366
Referee: Sgt. Win Cho (Myanmar)

26 April 2011
15:00 UTC+05:30

| Kingfisher East Bengal (India) | 3–3 | (Hong Kong) South China |
|---|---|---|
| Ozbey 20', 90+4' (pen.); Sahni 69' | Report | Kwok Kin Pong 58'; Cheng Lai Hin 87'; Li Haiqiang 90+3' |

Barabati Stadium, Cuttack^{8}
Attendance: 3,000
Referee: Kadhum Auda (Iraq)
26 April 2011
19:00 UTC+07:00

| Chonburi (Thailand) | 4–1 | (Indonesia) Persipura Jayapura |
|---|---|---|
| Suree 16'; Pipob 36', 72'; Therdsak 42' (pen.) | Report | Paulin 75' |

IPE Chonburi Stadium, Chonburi
Attendance: 6,821
Referee: Ryuji Sato (Japan)

3 May 2011
16:00 UTC+09:00

| Persipura Jayapura (Indonesia) | 4–2 | (Hong Kong) South China |
|---|---|---|
| Krangar 23'; B. Solossa 44', 60' (pen.); Pangkali 77' | Report | Xu Deshuai 36'; Ng Wai Chiu 86' |

Mandala Stadium, Jayapura^{7}
Attendance: 15,000
Referee: Mohd Nafeez Abdul Wahab (Malaysia)
3 May 2011
19:00 UTC+07:00

| Chonburi (Thailand) | 4–0 | (India) Kingfisher East Bengal |
|---|---|---|
| Ney Fabiano 45+1'; Therdsak 49'; Pipob 51', 69' | Report |

IPE Chonburi Stadium, Chonburi
Attendance: 6,897
Referee: Fan Qi (China P.R.)

10 May 2011
17:00 UTC+05:30

| Kingfisher East Bengal (India) | 1–1 | (Indonesia) Persipura Jayapura |
|---|---|---|
| Sahni 46' | Report | Bonai 3' |

Salt Lake Stadium, Kolkata
Attendance: 400
Referee: Ali Shaban (Kuwait)
10 May 2011
20:00 UTC+08:00

| South China (Hong Kong) | 0–3 | (Thailand) Chonburi |
|---|---|---|
| | Report | Ney Fabiano 61'; Sukree 67', 73' |

Hong Kong Stadium, Hong Kong
Attendance: 3,629
Referee: Strebre Delovski (Australia)

Notes

- Note 7: Last two home matches of Persipura Jayapura moved to Mandala Stadium at Jayapura after approval by AFC.
- Note 8: Kingfisher East Bengal v South China moved to Barabati Stadium at Cuttack due to the state assembly elections which would mean lack of security personnel for the match in Kolkata.
