= 2011 AFC Cup =

8th edition of AFC Cup

Tournament details
- Dates: 1 March – 29 October 2011
- Teams: 28+4 (from 15 associations)

Final positions
- Champions: (Uzbekistan) Nasaf Qarshi (1st title)
- Runners-up: Al-Kuwait

Tournament statistics
- Matches played: 117
- Goals scored: 363 (3.1 per match)
- Attendance: 684,016 (5,846 per match)
- Top scorer: (Montenegro) Ivan Bošković (10 goals)
- Best player: (Turkmenistan) Artur Gevorkyan

The 2011 AFC Cup was the eighth edition of the AFC Cup, a football competition organized by the Asian Football Confederation (AFC) for clubs from "developing countries" in Asia.

== Allocation of entries per association ==
- 2 teams qualified from each of the following associations:
  - Hong Kong
  - Iraq
  - Jordan
  - Kuwait
  - Lebanon
  - Maldives
  - Oman
  - Syria
  - Vietnam
  - Yemen
- 1 team qualified from each of the following associations:
  - Bahrain (withdrew and replaced by a team from Uzbekistan)
  - India
  - Thailand
- 4 invited teams, from the following associations:
  - Indonesia
  - Iraq
  - Singapore
  - Uzbekistan
- 5 losers from the 2011 AFC Champions League qualifying play-offs (including any of the 2010 AFC Cup finalists which fail to fulfil the criteria set by AFC to compete in the 2011 AFC Champions League, and thus directly enter the 2011 AFC Cup)

== Qualifying teams ==
The following is the list of participants confirmed by the AFC. There were 28 direct entries while 4 teams joined as losers of the 2011 AFC Champions League qualifying play-offs.

West Asia (Groups A–E)
Team	Qualifying method	App	Last App
(Iraq) Duhok	2009–10 Iraqi Premier League champions	1st	none
(Iraq) Al-Talaba	2009–10 Iraqi Premier League runners-up	1st	none
(Iraq) Arbil^{1}	2009–10 Iraqi Premier League 4th place	2nd	2009
(Jordan) Al-Faisaly	2009–10 Jordan League champions	5th	2009
(Jordan) Al-Wehdat	2009–10 Jordan FA Cup winners	6th	2010
(Kuwait) Al-Qadsia^{2}	2010 AFC Cup runners-up 2009–10 Kuwaiti Premier League champions 2010 Kuwait Emir Cup winners	2nd	2010
Al-Kuwait	2009–10 Kuwaiti Premier League runners-up	3rd	2010
(Kuwait) Al-Nasr	2009–10 Kuwaiti Premier League 3rd place	1st	none
(Lebanon) Al-Ahed	2009–10 Lebanese Premier League champions	5th	2010
(Lebanon) Al-Ansar	2009–10 Lebanese FA Cup winners	3rd	2008
(Oman) Al-Suwaiq	2009–10 Oman Mobile League champions	2nd	2009
(Oman) Al-Orouba	2010 Sultan Qaboos Cup winners	2nd	2009
(Syria) Al-Jaish	2009–10 Syrian Premier League champions	3rd	2010
(Syria) Al-Karamah	2009–10 Syrian Cup winners	3rd	2010
(Uzbekistan) Nasaf Qarshi^{1}	2010 Uzbek League 3rd place	2nd	2010
(Uzbekistan) Shurtan Guzar^{3}	2010 Uzbek League 4th place	1st	none
(Yemen) Al-Saqr	2009–10 Yemeni League champions	2nd	2007
(Yemen) Al-Tilal	2010 Yemeni President Cup winners	2nd	2009
(Syria) Al-Ittihad	2010 AFC Cup Winners; 2011 AFC Champions League qualifying play-off losers	2nd	2010
(India) Dempo	2011 AFC Champions League qualifying play-off losers	5th	2009

East Asia (Groups F–H)
Team	Qualifying method	App	Last App
(Hong Kong) South China	2009–10 Hong Kong First Division League champions 2009–10 Hong Kong Senior Challenge Shield winners	4th	2010
(Hong Kong) TSW Pegasus	2010 Hong Kong FA Cup winners	1st	none
(India) Kingfisher East Bengal	2010 Indian Federation Cup winners	5th	2010
(Indonesia) Persipura Jayapura^{1}	2009–10 Indonesia Super League runners-up	1st	none
(Maldives) VB	2010 Dhivehi League champions	4th	2010
(Maldives) Victory	2010 Maldives FA Cup winners	4th	2010
(Singapore) Tampines Rovers^{1}	2010 S.League runners-up	4th	2007
(Thailand) Chonburi	2010 Thai FA Cup winners	2nd	2009
(Vietnam) Ha Noi T&T	2010 V-League champions	1st	none
(Vietnam) Song Lam Nghe An	2010 Vietnamese Cup winners	1st	none
(Thailand) Muangthong United	2011 AFC Champions League qualifying play-off losers	2nd	2010
(Indonesia) Sriwijaya	2011 AFC Champions League qualifying play-off losers	2nd	2010

^{1} Invited to play in the competition.

^{2} Al-Qadsia failed to fulfil the criteria set by AFC to compete in the 2011 AFC Champions League, and so directly enter the 2011 AFC Cup.

^{3} Replaced Al-Ahli (2009–10 Bahrain First Division League champions).

== Schedule ==
Schedule of dates for 2011 competition.

Phase	Round	Draw date	First leg	Second leg
Group stage	Matchday 1	7 December 2010	1–2 March 2011	
Group stage	Matchday 2	7 December 2010	15–16 March 2011	
Group stage	Matchday 3	7 December 2010	12–13 April 2011	
Group stage	Matchday 4	7 December 2010	26–27 April 2011	
Group stage	Matchday 5	7 December 2010	3–4 May 2011	
Group stage	Matchday 6	7 December 2010	10–11 May 2011	
Knockout phase	Round of 16	7 December 2010	24–25 May 2011	
Knockout phase	Quarter-finals	7 June 2011	13 September 2011	27 September 2011
Knockout phase	Semi-finals	7 June 2011	4 October 2011	18 October 2011
Knockout phase	Final	7 June 2011	29 October 2011 at home of one of the finalists	

== Group stage ==
The draw for the group stage was held in Kuala Lumpur, Malaysia on 7 December 2010. Clubs from the same country could not be drawn into the same group. The winners and runners-up of each group advanced to the knockout stage.

=== Group A ===
Team	Pld	W	D	L	GF	GA	GD	Pts	NAS	DEM	ANS	TIL
(Uzbekistan) Nasaf Qarshi	6	6	0	0	30	4	+26	18		9–0	3–0	7–1
(India) Dempo	6	2	1	3	6	19	−13	7	0–4		2–1	2–1
(Lebanon) Al-Ansar	6	2	0	4	8	12	−4	6	1–4	2–0		0–2
(Yemen) Al-Tilal	6	1	1	4	9	18	−9	4	2–3	2–2	1–4	

Legend: Blue = home team win; Yellow = draw; Red = away team win.

=== Group B ===
Team	Pld	W	D	L	GF	GA	GD	Pts	QAD	SHU	ITT	SAQ
(Kuwait) Al-Qadsia	6	4	2	0	15	5	+10	14		4–0	3–2	3–0
(Uzbekistan) Shurtan Guzar	6	2	3	1	10	8	+2	9	1–1		1–1	7–2
(Syria) Al-Ittihad	6	2	2	2	7	7	0	8	0–2	0–0		2–0
(Yemen) Al-Saqr	6	0	1	5	5	17	−12	1	2–2	0–1	1–2	

Legend: Blue = home team win; Yellow = draw; Red = away team win.

=== Group C ===
Team	Pld	W	D	L	GF	GA	GD	Pts	DUH	FAI	JAI	NAS
(Iraq) Duhok	6	3	2	1	6	3	+3	11 (Note: Tiebreakers: Duhok, Al-Faisaly and Al-Jaish are ranked by their head-to-head records: Duhok (5 pts, +1 GD), Al-Faisaly (5 pts, 0 GD), Al-Jaish (5 pts, –1 GD).)		4–2	0–1	1–0
(Jordan) Al-Faisaly	6	3	2	1	8	6	+2	11	0–0		2–0	2–1
(Syria) Al-Jaish	6	3	2	1	8	4	+4	11	0–0	1–1		2–1
(Kuwait) Al-Nasr	6	0	0	6	2	11	−9	0	0–1	0–1	0–4	

Legend: Blue = home team win; Yellow = draw; Red = away team win.

=== Group D ===
Team	Pld	W	D	L	GF	GA	GD	Pts	WEH	KUW	TAL	SUW
(Jordan) Al-Wehdat	6	4	2	0	11	3	+8	14		1–0	0–0	5–1
Al-Kuwait	6	3	1	2	7	6	+1	10	1–3		1–0	0–0
(Iraq) Al-Talaba	6	1	2	3	4	6	−2	5	0–1	1–2		1–1
(Oman) Al-Suwaiq	6	0	3	3	5	12	−7	3	1–1	1–3	1–2	

Legend: Blue = home team win; Yellow = draw; Red = away team win.

=== Group E ===
Team	Pld	W	D	L	GF	GA	GD	Pts	ARB	AHE	ORU	KAR
(Iraq) Arbil	6	4	2	0	17	4	+13	14		6–2	0–0	1–1
(Lebanon) Al-Ahed	6	2	0	4	11	13	−2	6 (Note: Tiebreakers: Al-Ahed, Al-Orouba and Al-Karamah are ranked by their head-to-head records: Al-Ahed (6 pts, +3 GD), Al-Orouba (5 pts, –1 GD), Al-Karamah (5 pts, –2 GD).)	1–2		2–0	4–1
(Oman) Al-Orouba	6	1	3	2	4	10	−6	6	0–5	1–0		1–1
(Syria) Al-Karamah	6	1	3	2	8	13	−5	6	0–3	3–2	2–2	

Legend: Blue = home team win; Yellow = draw; Red = away team win.

=== Group F ===
Team	Pld	W	D	L	GF	GA	GD	Pts	SLN	SRW	TSW	VB
(Vietnam) Sông Lam Nghệ An	6	4	0	2	16	10	+6	12		4–0	1–2	4–2
(Indonesia) Sriwijaya	6	3	1	2	9	11	−2	10	3–1		3–2	1–1
(Hong Kong) TSW Pegasus	6	3	0	3	15	12	+3	9	2–3	1–2		3–0
(Maldives) VB	6	1	1	4	9	16	−7	4	1–3	2–0	3–5	

Legend: Blue = home team win; Yellow = draw; Red = away team win.

=== Group G ===
Team	Pld	W	D	L	GF	GA	GD	Pts	MTU	TRV	HTT	VIC
(Thailand) Muangthong United	6	4	2	0	14	1	+13	14		4–0	4–0	1–0
(Singapore) Tampines Rovers	6	3	2	1	12	8	+4	11	1–1		3–1	4–0
(Vietnam) Hà Nội T&T	6	2	2	2	5	8	−3	8	0–0	1–1		2–0
(Maldives) Victory	6	0	0	6	1	15	−14	0	0–4	1–3	0–1	

Legend: Blue = home team win; Yellow = draw; Red = away team win.

=== Group H ===
Team	Pld	W	D	L	GF	GA	GD	Pts	CHO	PJY	SCA	KEB
(Thailand) Chonburi	6	4	1	1	18	8	+10	13		4–1	3–0	4–0
(Indonesia) Persipura Jayapura	6	3	2	1	14	9	+5	11	3–0		4–2	4–1
(Hong Kong) South China	6	1	2	3	7	14	−7	5	0–3	1–1		1–0
(India) Kingfisher East Bengal	6	0	3	3	9	17	−8	3	4–4	1–1	3–3	

Source: RSSSF
Legend: Blue = home team win; Yellow = draw; Red = away team win.

== Knockout stage ==
=== Round of 16 ===
Based on the results from the group stage, the matchups of the round of 16 were decided as below. Each tie was played in one match, hosted by the winners of each group (Team 1) against the runners-up of another group (Team 2).

Team 1	Score	Team 2
Nasaf Qarshi (Uzbekistan)	2–1	(Jordan) Al-Faisaly
Duhok (Iraq)	1–0	(India) Dempo
Al-Qadsia (Kuwait)	2–2 (aet) (2–3 p)	Al-Kuwait
Al-Wehdat (Jordan)	2–1	(Uzbekistan) Shurtan Guzar
Arbil (Iraq)	1–0 (aet)	(Singapore) Tampines Rovers
Muangthong United (Thailand)	4–0	(Lebanon) Al-Ahed
Song Lam Nghe An (Vietnam)	1–3	(Indonesia) Persipura Jayapura
Chonburi (Thailand)	3–0	(Indonesia) Sriwijaya

=== Quarter-finals ===
The draw for the quarter-finals, semi-finals, and final was held in Kuala Lumpur, Malaysia on 7 June 2011. In this draw, the "country protection" rule was applied: if there are exactly two clubs from the same country, they may not face each other in the quarter-finals; however, if there are more than two clubs from the same country, they may face each other in the quarter-finals.

Team 1	Agg.	Team 2	1st leg	2nd leg
Persipura Jayapura (Indonesia)	1–3	(Iraq) Arbil	1–2	0–1
Chonburi (Thailand)	1–1 (3–4 p)	(Uzbekistan) Nasaf Qarshi	0–1	1–0 (aet)
Al-Kuwait	1–0	(Thailand) Muangthong United	1–0	0–0
Al-Wehdat (Jordan)	8–1	(Iraq) Duhok	5–1	3–0

=== Semi-finals ===
Team 1	Agg.	Team 2	1st leg	2nd leg
Nasaf Qarshi (Uzbekistan)	2–1	(Jordan) Al-Wehdat	1–0	1–1
Arbil (Iraq)	3–5	Al-Kuwait	0–2	3–3

=== Final ===
The final of the 2011 AFC Cup was hosted by one of the finalists, decided by draw.

29 October 2011
19:00 UTC+05:00

Nasaf Qarshi (Uzbekistan)	2 – 1	Al-Kuwait
Shomurodov 62'; Perepļotkins 65'	Report	Kabi 68'

Markaziy Stadium, Qarshi
Attendance: 15,753
Referee: Kim Dong-Jin (Korea Republic)

2011 AFC Cup

Nasaf Qarshi
1st Title

== Awards ==
The following awards were given for the 2011 AFC Cup:

- Most Valuable Player Award: (Turkmenistan) Artur Gevorkyan (Nasaf Qarshi)
- Top Scorer: (Montenegro) Ivan Bošković (Nasaf Qarshi)
- Fair Play Award: (Uzbekistan) Nasaf Qarshi

== Statistics ==
=== Top goalscorers ===
Rank	Player	Club	MD1	MD2	MD3	MD4	MD5	MD6	R16	QF1	QF2	SF1	SF2	F	Total
1	(Montenegro) Ivan Bošković	(Uzbekistan) Nasaf Qarshi	1			4	1	2		1			1		10
2	(Syria) Firas Al Khatib	(Kuwait) Al-Qadsia	1	1	1	2	1	2							8
3	(Brazil) Leandro Carrijó	(Hong Kong) TSW Pegasus		1	3	1	2								7
4	(Jordan) Hassan Abdel-Fattah	Al-Kuwait & (Jordan) Al-Wehdat	2							2	2				6
4	(Jordan) Mahmoud Shelbaieh	(Jordan) Al-Wehdat		2	2					2					6
4	(Singapore) Aleksandar Durić	(Singapore) Tampines Rovers	1	1	1	1	2								6
4	(Thailand) Pipob On-Mo	(Thailand) Chonburi	2			2	2								6
8	(Iraq) Muslim Mubarak	(Iraq) Arbil				2	1		1	1					5
8	(Australia) Tolgay Ozbey	(India) Kingfisher East Bengal	2	1		2									5
8	(Ivory Coast) Christian Kouakou	(Thailand) Muangthong United	1			2		1	1						5
8	(Indonesia) Boaz Solossa	(Indonesia) Persipura Jayapura	1	1			2		1						5
8	(Kuwait) Hamad Al Enezi	(Kuwait) Al-Qadsia	2	1	1				1						5
8	(Uzbekistan) Nosirbek Otakuziyev	(Uzbekistan) Nasaf Qarshi	1				1	3							5

=== Own goals ===
Amit Ghosh	Team	Against	Round	Date
(Brazil) Douglas Da Santos	(Maldives) VB	(Indonesia) Sriwijaya	Group stage Matchday 1	1 March 2011
(Maldives) Abdulla Haneef	(Maldives) VB	(Hong Kong) TSW Pegasus	Group stage Matchday 3	13 April 2011
(Oman) Hamed Al Daoudi	(Oman) Al-Oruba	(Iraq) Arbil	Group stage Matchday 4	27 April 2011
(Lebanon) Samer Zeineddine	(Lebanon) Al-Ahed	(Iraq) Arbil	Group stage Matchday 5	4 May 2011

== See also ==
- 2011 AFC Champions League
- 2011 AFC President's Cup
