= 2009–10 Yemeni League =

Yemeni League
- Season: 2009–10
- Dates: 5 November 2009 – 4 June 2010
- Champions: Al-Saqr
- Relegated: Al-Shula; Salam (al-Garfa); Al-Wahda (Aden); Al Yarmuk Al Rawda
- AFC Cup: Al-Saqr; Al-Tilal
- Matches: 182
- Goals: 396 (2.18 per match)
- Top goalscorer: (Republic of the Congo) Amboio (15 goals)

The 2009–10 Yemeni League was the 18th edition of top-level football in Yemen. The season began on 5 November 2009 and ended on 4 June 2010.

Al-Hilal Al-Sahili entered the season as defending champions having won the past two seasons.

Al-Saqr won the title and qualified for the AFC Cup along with Yemeni President Cup winners Al-Tilal who finished second in the league.

== Stadia and locations ==
Locations of teams in the 2009-10 Yemeni League

Club	Location	Stadium
Al-Ittihad Ibb	Ibb	
Al Saqr Ta'izz	Ta'izz	
Al Tilal Aden	Aden	May 22 Stadium
Al Ahli San'a'	San'a	Ali Muhesen Stadium
Shabab Al Baydaa	Al Bayda'	
Al-Oruba	Zabid	
Al Ahli Ta'izz	Ta'izz	
Al-Shula		
Al Wahda San'a'	San'a	
Al Wahda Aden	Aden	
Al Sha'ab Ibb	Ibb	
Al-Hilal Al-Sahili	Al Hudaydah	
Salam Al-Garfa		
Al Yarmuk Al Rawda	San'a	

== Final standings ==
Pos	Team	Pld	W	D	L	GF	GA	GD	Pts	Qualification or relegation
1	Al-Saqr (C)	26	16	4	6	43	23	+20	52	Qualification for the AFC Cup (Note: Al-Tilal qualified for the AFC Cup as 2010 Yemeni President Cup winners.)
2	Al-Tilal	26	14	5	7	43	26	+17	47	Qualification for the AFC Cup
3	Shabab Al Baydaa	26	14	2	10	31	23	+8	44	
4	Al-Ahli San'a'	26	12	7	7	29	23	+6	43	
5	Al-Ahli Taiz	26	13	2	11	34	32	+2	41	
6	Al-Oruba Zabid	26	12	3	11	36	30	+6	39	
7	Al-Wahda San'a'	26	9	10	7	28	24	+4	37	
8	Al-Ittihad Ibb	26	9	9	8	22	25	−3	36	
9	Al Sha'ab Ibb	26	8	7	11	29	30	−1	31	
10	Al-Hilal Al-Sahili	26	9	4	13	26	31	−5	31	
11	Al-Shula (R)	26	7	9	10	25	39	−14	30	Relegation to Yemeni Second Divisions
12	Al-Wahda Aden (R)	26	8	4	14	23	39	−16	28	Relegation to Yemeni Second Divisions
13	Salam Al-Garfa (R)	26	5	12	9	27	33	−6	27	Relegation to Yemeni Second Divisions
14	Al Yarmuk Al Rawda (R)	26	4	6	16	26	44	−18	18	Relegation to Yemeni Second Divisions

Updated to match(es) played on 9 June 2010. Source: RSSSF
Rules for classification: 1) points; 2) goal difference; 3) number of goals scored.
(C) Champions; (R) Relegated
