= Markaziy Stadium (Qarshi) =

Multi-use football stadium in Uzbekistan

Coordinates: 38°50′18″N 65°48′49″E

- Nasaf Stadium
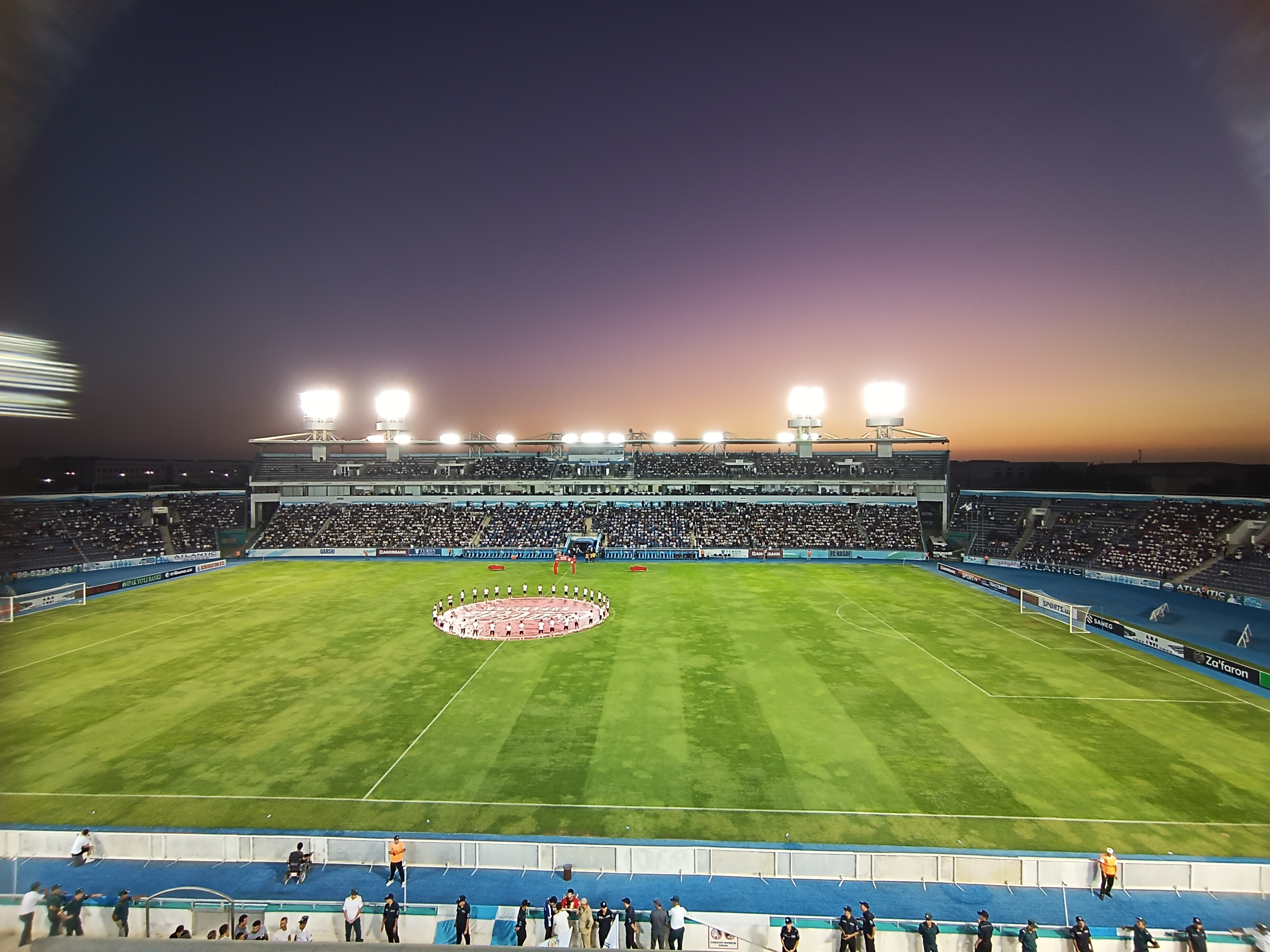
- Interactive map of Markaziy Stadium
- Location: Qarshi, Uzbekistan
- Capacity: 21,000
- Surface: Grass
- Field size: 104m x 68m

Construction
- Opened: 2006

Tenant
- Nasaf Qarshi

Website
- FC Nasaf website

The Markaziy Stadium (Uzbek: Markaziy Stadioni) is a multi-use football stadium in Qarshi, Uzbekistan. It serves as the home ground for Nasaf Qarshi.

== Stadium specific ==
First match was played between Nasaf and Uz-Dong-Ju Andijon on August 8, 2008. The stadium is able to accommodate 21,000 spectators. The total capacity includes 180 VIP seats, 220 seats for the press and 6 for commentators.

== Events ==
On October 29, 2011, Markaziy stadium was the Final venue of 2011 AFC Cup match between Nasaf and Kuwait SC.
