= Nosirbek Otakuziev =

Uzbekistan footballer (born 1984)

Personal information
- Full name: Nosirbek Otakuziev
- Date of birth: 30 January 1984 (age 42)
- Place of birth: Uzbekistan
- Height: 1.74 m (5 ft 9 in)
- Position: Striker

Team information
- Current team: Kokand 1912
- Number: 9

Senior career*
Years	Team	Apps	(Gls)
2003–2009	Neftchi Farg'ona	107	(49)
2010	Olmaliq FK	26	(13)
2011–2012	Nasaf Qarshi	26	(8)
2012	Olmaliq FK	10	(2)
2013	FK Guliston	12	(2)
2013–2014	Neftchi Farg'ona	21	(6)
2015–	Kokand 1912	1	(0)

International career^{‡}
2011–	Uzbekistan	2	(0)
- * Club domestic league appearances and goals as of 22 March 2015 ‡ National team caps and goals as of 24 August 2013

Nosirbek Otakuziev is an Uzbekistani footballer who currently plays for Kokand 1912 in the Uzbek League. He plays as a striker.

== Career ==
He played for Neftchi Farg'ona in 2003-2009. In 2010, he moved to Olmaliq FK. Playing for Olmaliq FK he became League best goalscorer with 13 goals. In 2011, he moved to Nasaf Qarshi. Otakuziev scored an important goal in the opening round of the group stage in the 2011 AFC Cup when he scored in the 77th minute against Al-Ansar Club. He made significant contribution of winning by Nasaf 2011 AFC Cup. He scored totally 5 goals and became 2nd best goal scorer of Nasaf in that year competition after Ivan Bošković with 10 goals. In League matches he scored 6 goals and also was 2nd best goal club scorer. In 2015, he moved to Kokand 1912.

== Honours ==
=== Club ===
Nasaf

- Uzbek League runners-up: 2011
- Uzbek Cup runners-up (3): 2011
- AFC Cup (1): 2011

=== Individual ===
- Uzbek League Top Scorer: 2010 (13 goals)
