= 2010 Yemeni President Cup =

Tournament details
- Country: Yemen

The 2010 Yemeni President Cup was the 13th edition of the Yemeni President Cup.

The cup winner were guaranteed a place in the 2011 AFC Cup.

== First round ==
First legs: May 27–June 11; Second legs: June 7–15

Team 1	Agg.	Team 2	1st leg	2nd leg
Khanfar	2–3	Shabab Al Baydaa	2–1	0–2
Al-Wahda Sanaa	3–0	Tadamun Shabwa	3–0	0–0
Al Rasheed Ta'izz	2–4	Al-Sha'ab Ibb	2–1	0–3
Al-Wahda Aden	6–2	Ahli Hudayda	1–2	5–0
Doan	2–5	September 26	2–2	0–3 (awd)
Salam Al-Garfa	6–0	Nasir Dalaa	3–0 (awd)	3–0 (awd)
Al Yarmuk Al Rawda	6–0	Shabab Amran	3–0 (awd)	3–0 (awd)
Al-Ittihad Ibb	6–0	Saioon	3–0 (awd)	3–0 (awd)
May 22	1–2	Taawun	0–2	1–0
Tadamun Mukalla	4–2	Al-Shula	1–2	3–0
Al-Hilal Al-Sahili	10–1	Sharara	7–1	3–0
Samoon	0–3	Al Ahli Sanaa	0–0	0–3 (awd)
Shabab Zaydiya	0–17	Al-Oruba	0–7	0–10
Al Ahli Taizz	4–7	Al Sha'ab Sana'a	2–4	2–3
Nahda Badan	2–11	Al-Tilal	2–4	0–7
Al-Saqr	6–3	Shamshan	3–1	3–2

== Second round ==
First legs: June 16–18; Second legs: June 20–22

Team 1	Agg.	Team 2	1st leg	2nd leg
Tadamun Mukalla	4–8	Al-Hilal Al-Sahili	2–2	2–6
Al-Saqr	2–3	Shabab Al Baydaa	1–3	1–0
Al-Ittihad Ibb	0–1	Al-Sha'ab Ibb	0–0	0–1
Al Sha'ab Sana'a	5–6	Al-Oruba	2–4	3–2
Al-Wahda Aden	5–3	Al Yarmuk Al Rawda	4–1	1–2
Al Ahli Sanaa	5–3	Al-Wahda Sanaa	3–1	2–2
Al-Tilal	5–1	Taawun	1–0	4–1
September 26	2–3	Salam Al-Garfa	1–1	1–2

== Quarterfinals ==
First legs: June 23–25; Second legs: June 26–28

Team 1	Agg.	Team 2	1st leg	2nd leg
Al-Sha'ab Ibb	0–7	Al-Oruba	0–4	0–3
Shabab Al Baydaa	5–1	Al Ahli Sanaa	3–0	2–1
Al-Tilal	7–1	Salam Al-Garfa	5–1	2–0
Al-Hilal Al-Sahili	6–2	Al-Wahda Aden	2–1	4–1

== Semifinals ==
First legs: July 1–2; Second legs: July 6

Team 1	Agg.	Team 2	1st leg	2nd leg
Shabab Al Baydaa	1–1 (a)	Al-Hilal Al-Sahili	0–0	1–1
Al-Oruba	2–3	Al-Tilal	2–0	0–3

== Final ==
18 July 2010

Al-Tilal	2–1	Shabab Al Baydaa
