= Jarah Al Ateeqi =

Kuwaiti footballer

Personal information
- Full name: Jarah Mohammed Al Ateeqi
- Date of birth: October 15, 1981 (age 45)
- Place of birth: Kuwait City, Kuwait
- Height: 1.73 m (5 ft 8 in)
- Position: Centre midfielder

Youth career
- 2000–2002: Al Kuwait

Senior career*
Years	Team	Apps	(Gls)
2000–2017	Al Kuwait		

International career^{‡}
2001–2013	Kuwait	112	(4)
- * Club domestic league appearances and goals as of May 2, 2017 ‡ National team caps and goals as of Jan 22, 2013

Jarah Al Ateeqi (Arabic: جراح العتيقي, born 15 October 1981) is a Kuwaiti former footballer who played as a midfielder for the Kuwaiti Premier League club Al Kuwait.

== International goals ==
#	Venue	Opponent	Score	Competition
1	Doha, Qatar	Qatar	2–2	Friendly
2	Abu Dhabi, UAE	India	9–1	Friendly
3	Aden, Yemen	Yemen	3–0	20th Arabian Gulf Cup

== Honours ==
Kuwait SC

- Kuwaiti Premier League: 2006, 2007, 2008
- Kuwait Emir Cup: 2009
- Kuwait Crown Prince Cup: 2008, 2010, 2011
- AFC Cup: 2009

Kuwait national football team

- 2010 West Asian Football Federation Championship
- 20th Arabian Gulf Cup

== See also ==
- List of men's footballers with 100 or more international caps
