= Buxoro Arena =

Coordinates: 39°46′07″N 64°25′33″E

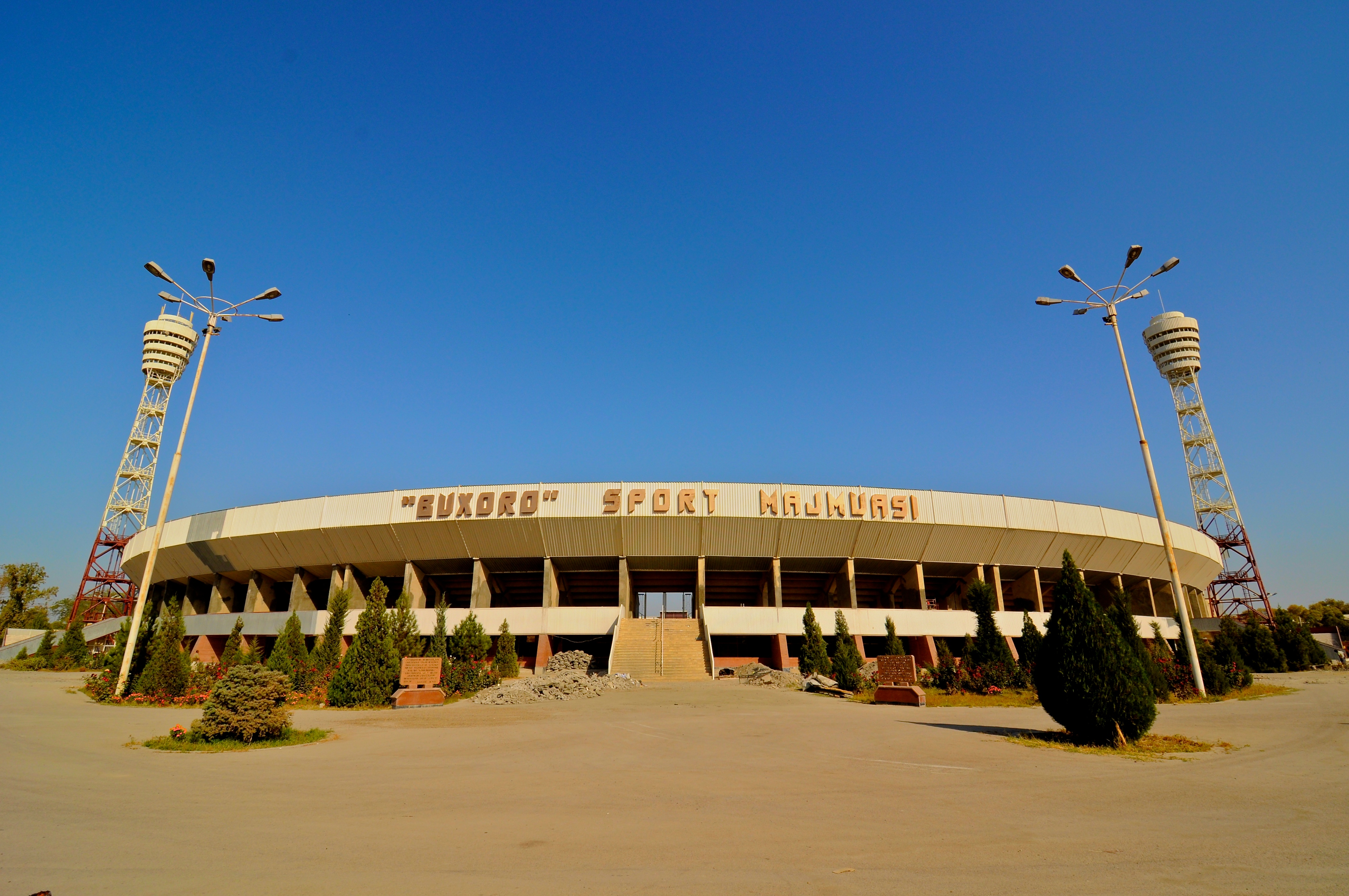
- Interactive map of Buxoro Arena
- Location: Bukhara, Uzbekistan
- Capacity: 22,700 (football)
- Surface: grass

Construction
- Built: 2002
- Opened: 2002
- Renovated: 2013

Tenant
- FK Buxoro

The Buxoro Arena, which is part of the Buxoro Sport Majmuasi, is a multi-use stadium in Bukhara, Uzbekistan. It is currently used mostly for football matches of FK Buxoro.

== History ==
The stadium holds 22,700 people. It was built in 2002.

In March 2012 Buxoro Sport Majmuasi stadium was renamed Buxoro Arena.
