= Khaled Al Shammari =

Kuwaiti footballer

Personal information
- Full name: Khaled Hezam Al Shammari
- Date of birth: January 2, 1977 (age 49)
- Place of birth: Kuwait City, Kuwait
- Height: 1.82 m (5 ft 11 1/2 in)
- Position: Defender

Team information
- Current team: Al Kuwait

Senior career*
Years	Team	Apps	(Gls)
2003–2009	Kazma		
2009–2013	Al Kuwait		

International career^{‡}
2003–2008	Kuwait	20	(0)
- * Club domestic league appearances and goals as of November 2, 2011 ‡ National team caps and goals as of November 2, 2008

Khaled Al Shammari (Arabic: خالد الشمري, born 2 January 1977) is a Kuwaiti footballer who is a defender for the Kuwaiti Premier League club Al Kuwait on loan from Kazma.

He announced from international team in 2008.
