= Abdulla Haneef =

Maldivian footballer (born 1984)

Personal information
- Full name: Abdulla Haneef
- Date of birth: 2 October 1984 (age 42)
- Place of birth: Maldives
- Height: 1.64 m (5 ft 5 in)
- Positions: Defender; midfielder

Senior career*
Years	Team	Apps	(Gls)
2005–2006	Hurriyya		
2008–2011	VB Addu		
2012	Eagles		
2013	VB Addu		
2014–2015	Valencia		
2015	Eagles		
2016	New Radiant		
2017–2018	TC Sports		
2019	Maziya		
2019	TC Sports		
2020–2022	Super United		
2022	Valencia		
2023	Eagles		

International career
2006	Maldives U23		
2009–2011	Maldives	4	(0)

Managerial career
- 2025–: Eagles
- * Club domestic league appearances and goals

Abdulla Haneef (born 2 October 1984), commonly known as Benjo was a Maldivian professional footballer who played as a defender.

== Club career ==
He started playing at Hurriyya, before playing for VB Addu, Eagles, Valencia and New Radiant. He joined TC in 2017.

== International career ==
Haneef made his debut against Philippines on 16 April 2009, in the 2010 AFC Challenge Cup qualification. He came in as an 83rd-minute substitute for Mukhthar Naseer.
