= Boris Kabi =

Ivorian footballer

Personal information
- Full name: Boris Landry Kabi
- Date of birth: December 12, 1984 (age 41)
- Place of birth: Abidjan, Côte d'Ivoire
- Height: 1.83 m (6 ft 0 in)
- Position: Forward

Senior career*
Years	Team	Apps	(Gls)
2007–2009	Olympic Safi		(5)
2008–2009	→ Al-Raed (Loan)	21	(9)
2009–2010	Ajman	21	(9)
2010–2011	→ Al Dhafra (Loan)	18	(11)
2011	Al Kuwait	4	(2)
2012–2015	Ajman	83	(54)
2015–2016	Dibba Al Fujairah	23	(8)
2016-2017	Al-Shaab	21	(12)
- * Club domestic league appearances and goals

Boris Kabi is an Ivorian footballer who last played for Al-Shaab.

== Club career statistics ==
Club	Season	Division	League		UAE President's Cup		Continental		UAE League Cup		Total	
Club	Season	Division	Apps	Goals	Apps	Goals	Apps	Goals	Apps	Goals	Apps	Goals
Al Raed	2008–09	SPL	21	9							21	9
Al Raed	Total		21	9							21	9
Al Dhafra	2010–11	UPL	18	11			+2 (Note: Appearances in GCC Champions League)	4	8	4	+28	19
Al Dhafra	Total		18	11			+2	4	8	4	+28	19
Kuwait	2011–12	KPL	4	2	+4 (Note: Appearances in Kuwait Crown Prince Cup)	5	5 (Note: Appearances in AFC Cup)	3	+3 (Note: Appearances in Kuwait Federation Cup)	5	+16	15
Kuwait	Total		4	2	+4	5	5	3	+3	5	+16	15
Ajman	2009-10	UPL	21	9					8	7		
Ajman	2011-12	UPL	8	7					4	0		
Ajman	2012-13	UPL	25	23	1	1			8	4		
Ajman	2013-14	UPL	25	13	1	0			6	1		
Ajman	2014-15	UPL	25	11	2	0			4	1		
Ajman	Total		104	63		1			30	13		
Dibba Al Fujairah	2015–16	UPL	23	8	1	0			6	3		
Dibba Al Fujairah	Total		23	8	1	0			6	3		
Al-Shaab	2016-17	UFDL	21	12	3	0						
Al-Shaab	Total		21	12	3	0						
Career total												
