= Ali Al Kandari =

Kuwaiti footballer

Personal information
- Full name: Ali Abdulrahman Abdulrahim Al Kandari
- Date of birth: 12 March 1985 (age 41)
- Place of birth: Kuwait City, Kuwait
- Position: Striker

Youth career
- 1999–2004: Al Qadsia

Senior career*
| Years | Team | Apps | (Gls) |
| 2004–2009 | Al Qadsia | 89 | (20) |
| 2008–2009 | → Al Tadamon (loan) | 12 | (4) |
| 2009–2018 | Al Kuwait | 87 | (15) |
| Total | | 188 | (49) |

International career^{‡}
| 2011–2014 | Kuwait | 14 | (2) |
- * Club domestic league appearances and goals ‡ National team caps and goals as of 12 March 2017

Ali Al Kandari (born 12 March 1985) is a Kuwaiti footballer. He currently plays for Kuwaiti Premier League side Al Kuwait.

== International career ==
=== International goals ===
Scores and results list Kuwait's goal tally first.

| No | Date | Venue | Opponent | Score | Result | Competition |
|---|---|---|---|---|---|---|
| 1. | 17 December 2011 | Jassim Bin Hamad Stadium, Doha, Qatar | Saudi Arabia | 1–0 | 2–0 | 2011 Pan Arab Games |
| 2. | 13 October 2014 | Amman International Stadium, Amman, Jordan | Jordan | 1–1 | 1–1 | Friendly |
