= Andrejs Perepļotkins =

Ukrainian-born Latvian footballer

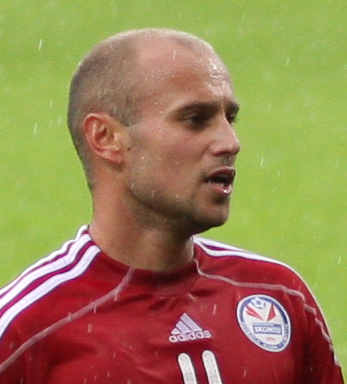
- Perepļotkins playing for Skonto

Personal information
- Full name: Andrejs Perepļotkins
- Date of birth: 27 December 1984 (age 41)
- Place of birth: Kharkiv, Ukrainian SSR, Soviet Union (now Ukraine)
- Height: 1.72 m (5 ft 8 in)
- Position: Winger

Youth career
- Metalist Kharkiv

Senior career*
Years	Team	Apps	(Gls)
2001–2002	Metalist Kharkiv	0	(0)
2002	→ Fili Moscow (loan)		
2002–2003	Anderlecht	0	(0)
2003–2004	Southampton	0	(0)
2003	→ Bohemians (loan)	18	(3)
2004–2011	Skonto Rīga	141	(44)
2008–2009	→ Derby County (loan)	2	(0)
2011–2012	Nasaf Qarshi	40	(8)
2013	Narva Trans	7	(1)
2013	Daugava Rīga	13	(1)
2014	Ararat Yerevan	12	(2)
2014–2015	ENAD Polis	14	(1)
2015	Caramba/Dinamo	8	(10)
2016	Skonto Rīga	12	(5)
2016–2018	Jelgava	32	(3)
2018–2019	SK Super Nova	39	(6)
2019–2020	Kupiškis	12	(0)
2020–2021	SK Super Nova	5	(0)
Total		355	(85)

International career
2007–2012	Latvia	36	(3)

Managerial career
- 2023–2024: SK Super Nova (assistant)
- 2024: SK Super Nova II (assistant)
- * Club domestic league appearances and goals

Andrejs Perepļotkins (Ukrainian: Андрій Ігорович Перепльоткін, Andriy Igorovych Pereplyotkin; born 27 December 1984) is a Ukrainian born Latvian former footballer, who used to primarily play as a winger.

Although born in Ukraine, he played internationally for Latvia from 2007 to 2012.

== Club career ==
=== Early career ===
Perepļotkins joined Metalist Kharkiv at the age of 18, but over the next two years had spells with several different clubs. Those clubs included Fili Moscow and the famous Belgian club Anderlecht, as well as spending time at Southampton F.C.'s academy. Due to issues in regards to obtaining a work permit, Perepļotkins was unable to play for Southampton in front of a paying crowd, thus preventing him appearing for the first team.

=== Bohemians and Skonto Rīga ===
His big break came with Irish side Bohemians, where he played 18 games, scoring three goals and winning the League of Ireland title in 2003, however he was released by Bohs midway through the 2004 season. The Latvian side Skonto Rīga signed Perepļotkins in the beginning of the 2004–05 season. Over the next six years Perepļotkins played 141 Latvian Higher League matches, scoring 44 times and helping the club win the 2004 Latvian Higher League, 2005 Livonia Cup, as well as the Latvian Higher League 2010. While playing with Skonto, Perepļotkins was a regular participant in the UEFA Champions League and UEFA Europa League qualification matches.

=== Derby County ===
On 1 August 2008, Perepļotkins joined Derby County on trial and he made his debut in a 2–2 with Dutch side F.C. Utrecht on 3 August. After impressing in training and the game Derby agreed a loan fee with Skonto and signed Perepļotkins on a season long loan on 7 August 2008, alongside Serbian striker Aleksandar Prijović.

Perepļopkins made his full debut against Doncaster on 9 August, being replaced by Steve Davies after 64 minutes. However, he played just once more for Derby and his loan was terminated 6 months in by mutual consent on 15 January 2009 by new Derby manager Nigel Clough.

=== Nasaf Qarshi and the return to Baltic states ===
Before the start of the 2011 season Perepļotkins joined the Uzbek League club Nasaf Qarshi, signing a two-year contract. In his first season with Nasaf Perepļotkins scored 7 goals in 24 league appearances and became the team's top scorer. He also helped his club the AFC Cup, scoring the winning goal in the final. Suffering from a long-term injury, Perepļotkins played just 16 matches, scoring once in 2012. In March 2013 he moved back to the Baltic states, joining the Estonian Meistriliiga club Narva Trans on a one-year deal. In his league debut Perepļotkins scored a goal, with the match against Tallinna Kalev ending in a 1–1 draw. Due to continuing injuries his stay in Estonia was not long lasting and in August 2013 Perepļotkins moved back to the Latvian Higher League, joining Daugava Rīga. With 1 goal in 13 league appearances he led the club to its best achievement in history, finishing the season in the top four of the championship.

=== Ararat Yerevan and ENAD Polis Chrysochous ===
In February 2014 Perepļotkins moved to the Armenian Premier League club Ararat Yerevan, signing a contract until the end of the season. With 2 goals in 12 appearances he could not manage to lead his club into the top three and, therefore, also the UEFA Europa League spot, with Ararat falling three points short to Mika and ending the season in the fourth position. In August 2014 Perepļotkins joined the Cypriot Second Division club ENAD Polis Chrysochous.

== International career ==
In 2007, after several years of successful performance in the Latvian championship, Perepļotkins was offered the chance to obtain Latvian citizenship and join the national team. He accepted the offer and acquired Latvian citizenship on 16 March 2007, becoming available for selection by Latvia internationally. Perepļotkins made his international debut for Latvia as they unsuccessfully tried to qualify for Euro 2008. Playing for the national team from 2007 to 2012 Perepļotkins collected 36 caps, scoring three times.

== Honours ==
Skonto

- Latvian Higher League: 2004, 2010

Nasaf Qarshi

- AFC Cup: 2011

Latvia

- Baltic Cup: 2008, 2012
