= Ivan Bošković =

Montenegrin footballer

Personal information
- Date of birth: 1 January 1982 (age 44)
- Place of birth: Nikšić, SR Montenegro; SFR Yugoslavia
- Height: 1.90 m (6 ft 3 in)
- Position: Striker

Team information
- Current team: Sogdiana Jizzakh (manager)

Senior career*
Years	Team	Apps	(Gls)
1999–2004	Sutjeska	78	(27)
2004–2005	Budućnost	10	(3)
2005–2006	SCO Angers	4	(1)
2006	Budućnost	18	(5)
2006–2007	Vojvodina	10	(1)
2007–2008	Borac Čačak	16	(1)
2008–2010	Grbalj	61	(39)
2011–2012	Nasaf Qarshi	51	(20)
2013–2014	Chonburi	10	(3)
2013–2014	→ Sriracha (loan)	9	(6)
2014–2016	Nakhon Ratchasima	29	(18)
2015	→ BEC Tero Sasana (loan)	20	(4)
2016	Sisaket	12	(1)
2016	Krabi	5	(0)
2017	Sutjeska		
2017	Rayong	11	(6)
2018	Huai Thalaeng United		

International career
- FR Yugoslavia U21

Managerial career
- 2018: Huai Thalaeng United (player-coach)
- 2019: Lampang (assistant)
- 2020–2022: Bunyodkor U19
- 2022: Bunyodkor U21
- 2022–2023: Bunyodkor
- 2023–: Sogdiana Jizzakh
- * Club domestic league appearances and goals

Ivan Bošković (Montenegrin Cyrillic: Иван Бошковић, born 1 January 1982) is a Montenegrin former professional football player who is the manager of Uzbekistani club Sogdiana Jizzakh.

== Playing career ==
Born in Podgorica, then part of SR Montenegro, SFR Yugoslavia, he begin his career in his hometown club FK Iskra Danilovgrad. 1999 he moved to FK Sutjeska Nikšić which was a regular top flight side at that time. In summer 2004 he moved to their biggest Montenegrin rivals, FK Budućnost Podgorica, also playing back then in the First League of Serbia and Montenegro. In January 2005, during the winter break, he moved to France and joined Ligue 2 side SCO Angers, where he played the rest of the season before returning to Budućnost in the following summer.

In summer 2006 the leagues of Serbia and Montenegro separated and Ivan Bošković left Budućnost and moved to Serbia to play in the SuperLiga, first with FK Vojvodina during the 2006–07 seasons, and next with FK Borac Čačak during the 2007–08 season.

In summer 2008 he returns to Montenegro and signs with a First League side OFK Grbalj where he will play during the following three seasons and become the league top-scorer in 2010 with 28 goals. In 2011, he moved to Uzbekistan and joined Nasaf Qarshi where he won 2011 AFC Cup and become top scorer of 2011 AFC Cup with 10 goals. Nickname is – "Boskogoal" and "Boshdagol".
